= 2021 WCHA men's ice hockey tournament =

2021 WCHA Men's ice hockey tournament
- Dates: March 12–20, 2020
- Teams: 8
- Finals site: Mayo Clinic Health System Event Center; Mankato, Minnesota
- Champions: Lake Superior State (1st title)
- Winning coach: Damon Whitten (1st title)
- Most Outstanding Player: Ashton Calder (Lake Superior State)
- WCHA Men's Ice Hockey Tournaments

The 2021 WCHA Men's Ice Hockey Tournament was the 62nd and final tournament in the history of the men's Western Collegiate Hockey Association. The tournament was held between March 12 and March 20, 2021. Quarterfinal games were played on home campus sites, however, due to the COVID-19 pandemic, all semifinal and championship games were held at the Mayo Clinic Health System Event Center, the home venue for Minnesota State. By winning the tournament, Lake Superior State received the WCHA's automatic bid for the 2021 NCAA Division I Men's Ice Hockey Tournament.

After the 2020–21 season, the men's WCHA disbanded after seven of its members left to reestablish the Central Collegiate Hockey Association. Two other members dropped men's hockey after the season. The WCHA remains in operation as a women-only league.

== Format ==
The first round of the postseason tournament featured a best-of-three games format, while the semifinals and final were single games held at the campus site of the highest remaining seed. The top eight conference teams participated in the tournament. Teams were seeded No. 1 through No. 8 according to their final conference standings, with a tiebreaker system used to seed teams with an identical number of points accumulated. The higher seeded teams each earned home ice and hosted one of the lower seeded teams.

== Conference standings ==
2020–21 Western Collegiate Hockey Association Standings
	Conference record										Overall record					
	GP	W	L	T	OTW	OTL	3/SW	PTS	GF	GA	GP	W	L	T	GF	GA
#4 Minnesota State †	14	13	1	0	1	1	0	39	56	15	27	22	5	1	100	46
#14 Lake Superior State *	14	9	5	0	2	2	0	27	39	34	29	19	7	3	86	63
#18 Bowling Green	14	8	5	1	0	2	0	27	46	34	31	20	10	1	108	67
#10 Bemidji State	14	8	5	1	3	2	0	24	42	34	29	16	10	3	82	70
Michigan Tech	14	7	7	0	1	0	0	20	38	35	30	17	12	1	78	63
Northern Michigan	14	6	7	1	2	2	1	20	40	47	29	11	17	1	79	103
Alabama–Huntsville	14	3	11	0	1	0	0	8	18	49	22	3	18	1	31	80
Ferris State	14	0	13	1	0	1	1	3	28	59	25	1	23	1	55	103
Alaska	0	-	-	-	-	-	-	-	-	-	0	-	-	-	-	-
Alaska Anchorage	0	-	-	-	-	-	-	-	-	-	0	-	-	-	-	-
Championship: March 20, 2021 † indicates conference regular season champion * indicates conference tournament champion Rankings: USCHO.com Top 20 Poll

== Bracket ==
Quarterfinals; March 12–14
1	Minnesota State	3	3	—
8	Ferris State	0	1	—
2	Lake Superior State	6	4	—
7	Alabama-Huntsville	1	1	—
(Pairings are reseeded after the first round)
3	Bowling Green	3	5	1
6	Northern Michigan	4	0	5
4	Bemidji State	3	4	—
5	Michigan Tech	1	1	—

Semifinals; March 19
1	Minnesota State	1
6	Northern Michigan	5
2	Lake Superior State	4
4	Bemidji State	1

Championship; March 20
6	Northern Michigan	3
2	Lake Superior State	6

Note: * denotes overtime periods

== Results ==
=== Quarterfinals ===
==== (1) Minnesota State vs. (8) Ferris State ====
March 12, 2021; 6:07 PM	Minnesota State	3 – 0 (0–0, 0–0, 3–0)	Ferris State	Mayo Clinic Health System Event Center, Mankato, Minnesota; Attendance: 250

Game reference

Dryden McKay
Goalies
Logan Stein
Referees:
Bruce Vida
Ryan Gordon
Linesmen:
Matt Tyree
Kyle Domin

(Smith, Borchardt) Julian Napravnik (10) – GW – 48:49	1–0
(Zmolek, Livingstone) Jared Spooner (3) – 49:42	2–0
(McMahan) Walker Duehr (8) – 55:28	3–0

2 min
Penalties
4 min
27
Shots
15

March 13, 2021; 4:07 pm	Minnesota State	3 – 1 (0–0, 1–0, 2–1)	Ferris State	Mayo Clinic Health System Event Center, Mankato, Minnesota; Attendance: 250

Game reference

Dryden McKay
Goalies
Logan Stein
Referees:
Bruce Vida
Ryan Gordon
Linesmen:
Matt Tyree
Kyle Domin

(Spooner, McMahan) Walker Duehr (9) – 29:03	1–0
(Gerads) Sam Morton (4) – GW – 42:19	2–0
(Gerads) Jake Livingstone (4) – EN – 59:15	3–0
	3–1	53:00 – PP – Marshall Moise (4) (Norris, Pokorny)

2 min
Penalties
4 min
31
Shots
24

Minnesota State Won Series 2–0

==== (2) Lake Superior State vs. (7) Alabama–Huntsville ====
March 12, 2021; 7:07 PM	Lake Superior State	6 – 1 (2–0, 4–1, 0–0)	Alabama–Huntsville	Taffy Abel Arena, Sault Ste. Marie, Michigan; Attendance: 0

Game reference

Mareks Mitens (40:00)
Ethan Langenegger (20:00)
Goalies
David Fessenden (36:20)
Derek Krall (23:40)
Referees:
Scott Roth
Shane Paskey
Linesmen:
Eric Froberg
Jamie Grace

(Calder, Boudon) Pete Veillette (12) – 03:14	1–0
(Nordqvist, Riedell) Brandon Puricelli (5) – GW – 45:17	2–0
	2–1	21:35 – PP – Lucas Bahn (2) (Neudecker, Corrow)
(unassisted) Pete Veillette (13) – 21:41	3–1
(Calder, Boudon) Lukas Kaelble (1) – 33:50	4–1
(Nordqvist, Posa) Alexandro Ambrosio (1) – 36:20	5–1
(Eriksson) Miroslav Mucha (5) – 38:40	6–1

24 min
Penalties
20 min
27
Shots
14

March 13, 2021; 5:07 pm	Lake Superior State	4 – 1 (0–0, 3–1, 1–1)	Alabama–Huntsville	Taffy Abel Arena, Sault Ste. Marie, Michigan; Attendance: 0

Game reference

Seth Eisele
Goalies
David Fessenden
Referees:
Scott Roth
Shane Paskey
Linesmen:
Eric Froberg
Jamie Grace

(Jeffers, Eriksson) Louis Boudon (8) – PP – 20:18	1–0
(Puricelli, Eriksson) Will Riedell (6) – PP GW – 27:15	2–0
(Oliver, Veillette) Hampus Eriksson (5) – PP – 30:25	3–0
(Manz) Brandon Puricelli (6) – 53:20	4–0
	4–1	18:41 – PP – Mick Henegan (1) (Merkley, Scoville)

10 min
Penalties
18 min
35
Shots
17

Lake Superior State Won Series 2–0

==== (3) Bowling Green vs. (6) Northern Michigan ====
March 12, 2021; 7:00 PM	Bowling Green	3 – 4 (1–0, 0–4, 2–0)	Northern Michigan	Slater Family Ice Arena, Bowling Green, Ohio; Attendance: 630

Game reference

Eric Dop
Goalies
Rico DiMatteo
Referees:
Rick Nelson
Mike Forys
Linesmen:
Marty Shaffer
Paul Tunison

(Theocharidis, Craggs) Taylor Schneider (8) – 13:32	1–0
	1–1	29:48 – PP – Alex Frye (4) (Van Unen, Schultz)
	1–2	30:37 – Mikey Colella (2) (unassisted)
	1–3	33:26 – PP – Griffin Loughran (5) (Vanderbeck, Van Unen)
	1–4	37:05 – GW – Brandon Schultz (5) (Vanderbeck)
(Wells, Wright) Taylor Schneider (9) – 41:45	2–4
(Cullen, Theocharidis) Taylor Schneider (10) – 49:29	3–4

10 min
Penalties
10 min
33
Shots
21

March 13, 2021; 7:07 PM	Bowling Green	3 – 4 (2–0, 0–0, 3–0)	Northern Michigan	Slater Family Ice Arena, Bowling Green, Ohio; Attendance: 630

Game reference

Eric Dop
Goalies
Rico DiMatteo (44:42)
John Hawthorne (15:18)
Referees:
Rick Nelson
Mike Forys
Linesmen:
Marty Shaffer
Paul Tunison

(Johnson, Kruse) Cameron Wright (8) – GW – 11:48	1–0
(Craggs, Cullen) Ethan Scardina (1) – 19:21	2–0
(Craggs, Johnson) Evan Dougherty (7) – 43:05	3–0
(Cullen, Theocharidis) Evan Dougherty (8) – 44:42	4–0
(Theocharidis, Craggs) Alex Barber (9) – PP – 47:40	5–0

6 min
Penalties
23 min
50
Shots
23

March 14, 2021; 5:07 PM	Bowling Green	3 – 4 (0–2, 1–1, 0–2)	Northern Michigan	Slater Family Ice Arena, Bowling Green, Ohio; Attendance: 630

Game reference

Eric Dop
Goalies
Rico DiMatteo
Referees:
Rick Nelson
Mike Forys
Linesmen:
Marty Shaffer
Paul Tunison

	0–1	05:33 – Vincent de Mey (7) (Marritt, Keefer)
	0–2	17:56 – GW – Mikey Colella (3) (Ghantous, Nardi)
	0–3	37:04 – PP – Joseph Nardi (11) (Van Unen, Vanderbeck)
(Dougherty, Barber) Sam Craggs (4) – PP – 38:48	1–3
	1–4	46:02 – PP – Mikey Colella (4) (Ghantous, Vanderbeck)
	1–5	58:08 – EN – Garrett Klee (3) (unassisted)

36 min
Penalties
24 min
40
Shots
34

Northern Michigan Won Series 2–1

==== (4) Bemidji State vs. (5) Michigan Tech ====
March 12, 2021; 7:07 PM	Bemidji State	3 – 1 (2–1, 1–0, 0–0)	Michigan Tech	Sanford Center, Bemidji, Minnesota; Attendance: 250

Game reference

Zach Driscoll
Goalies
Blake Pietila
Referees:
Robert Lukkason
Brady Johnson
Linesmen:
Nathan Voll
Tyler Landman

	0–1	02:33 – Brian Halonen (8) (Ashbrook, Nardella)
(Harris, Looft) Aaron Miller (6) – 08:00	1–1
(Jubenvill, L. Sillinger) Alex Ierullo (7) – GW – 14:22	2–1
(O. Sillinger, Ierullo) Lukas Sillinger (6) – 31:42	3–1

6 min
Penalties
2 min
26
Shots
34

March 13, 2021; 6:07 PM	Bemidji State	4 – 1 (0–1, 2–0, 2–0)	Michigan Tech	Sanford Center, Bemidji, Minnesota; Attendance: 250

Game reference

Zach Driscoll
Goalies
Blake Pietila
Referees:
Robert Lukkason
Brady Johnson
Linesmen:
Nathan Voll
Tyler Landman

	0–1	12:09 – Tommy Parrottino (6) (Swoyer, Thorne)
(Kirkup) Brad Johnson (3) – 36:58	1–1
(Rosén, Miller) Ethan Somoza (7) – GW – 37:49	2–1
(Zmolek) Alex Adams (2) – EN – 57:42	3–1
(Ierullo, Johnson) Ross Armour (4) – EN – 59:29	4–1

8 min
Penalties
2 min
31
Shots
34

Bemidji State Won Series 2–0

=== Semifinals ===
==== (1) Minnesota State vs. (6) Northern Michigan ====
March 19, 2021; 2:07 PM	Minnesota State	1 – 5 (0–1, 0–4, 1–0)	Northern Michigan	Mayo Clinic Health System Event Center, Mankato, Minnesota; Attendance: 250

Game reference

Dryden McKay (31:05)
Ryan Edquist (28:55)
Goalies
Rico DiMatteo
Referees:
Bruce Vida
T. J. Likens
Linesmen:
Tyler Landman
Nathan Voll

	0–1	01:16 – PP – André Ghantous (8) (Nardi)
	0–2	20:24 – GW – Alex Frye (5) (Newhouse, Schultz)
	0–3	28:56 – Joseph Nardi (12) (Sorensen)
	0–4	31:05 – A. J. Vanderbeck (8) (Frye, Schultz)
	0–5	32:57 – PP – André Ghantous (9) (Nardi, Vanderbeck)
(Furry, Gerads) Reggie Lutz (8) – PP – 42:49	1–5

4 min
Penalties
4 min
29
Shots
20

==== (2) Lake Superior State vs. (4) Bemidji State ====
March 19, 2021; 7:37 PM	Lake Superior State	4 – 1 (1–0, 2–0, 1–1)	Bemidji State	Mayo Clinic Health System Event Center, Mankato, Minnesota; Attendance: 250

Game reference

Mareks Mitens
Goalies
Zach Driscoll
Referees:
Rick Nelson
Mike Forys
Linesmen:
Matt Tyree
Kyle Domin

(Manz, Jeffers) Brandon Puricelli (7) – 13:28	1–0
(Eriksson, Mucha) Jacob Bengtsson (2) – GW – 35:31	2–0
(Miura, Mucha) Hampus Eriksson (6) – 38:14	3–0
(Eriksson) Lukas Kaelble (2) – 44:14	4–0
	4–1	56:00 – PP EA – Ethan Somoza (5) (O. Sillinger, Rosén)

8 min
Penalties
4 min
21
Shots
27

=== Championship ===
==== (2) Lake Superior State vs. (6) Northern Michigan ====
March 20, 2021; 7:07 PM	Lake Superior State	6 – 3 (2–0, 2–1, 2–2)	Northern Michigan	Mayo Clinic Health System Event Center, Mankato, Minnesota; Attendance: 250

Game reference

Mareks Mitens
Goalies
Rico DiMatteo
Referees:
Robert Lukkason
Brady Johnson
Linesmen:
Nathan Voll
Tyler Landman

(Puricelli, Nordqvist) Dustin Manz (2) – 01:20	1–0
(Manz, Jeffers) Brandon Puricelli (8) – 12:02	2–0
(Mucha, Henrikson) Jacob Nordqvist (3) – 30:50	3–0
(Veillette, Boudon) Ashton Calder (13) – GW – 33:30	4–0
	4–1	39:14 – PP – André Ghantous (10) (Vanderbeck, Van Unen)
	4–2	43:05 – A. J. Vanderbeck (5) (Frye)
(Veillette, Kaelble) Ashton Calder (14) – SH – 51:04	5–2
	5–3	55:52 – David Keefer (2) (Erkkila)
(unassisted) Ashton Calder (15) – EN – 57:24	6–3

4 min
Penalties
2 min
30
Shots
28

== Tournament awards ==
=== Most Outstanding Player ===
Ashton Calder (Lake Superior State)
