= 2020–21 Minnesota State Mavericks men's ice hockey season =

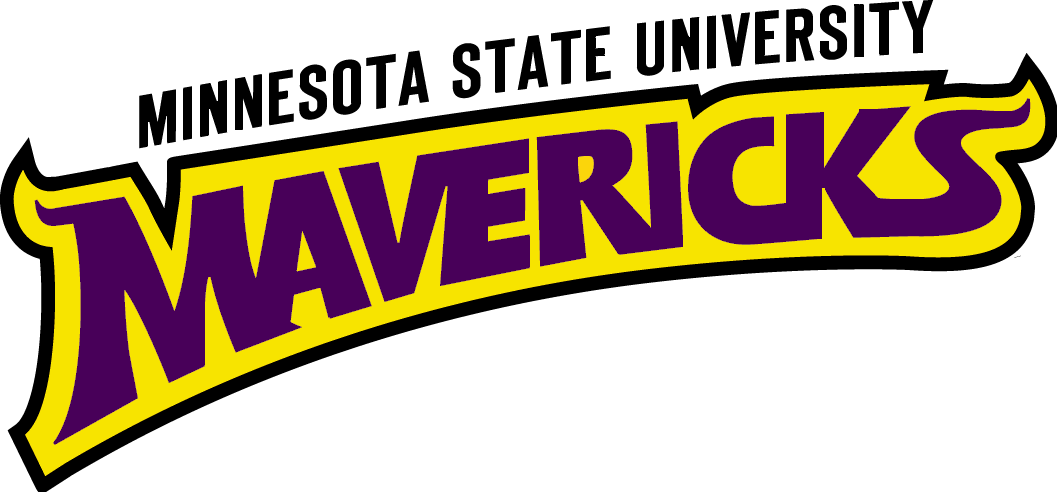

WCHA, Champion NCAA Tournament, Frozen Four
- Conference: 1st WCHA
- Home ice: Mayo Clinic Health System Event Center

Rankings
- USCHO: 4
- USA Today: 3

Record
- Overall: 22–5–1
- Conference: 13–1–0–1–1–0
- Home: 10–1–1
- Road: 10–3–0
- Neutral: 2–1–0

Coaches and captains
- Head coach: Mike Hastings
- Assistant coaches: Todd Knott; Darren Blue; Brennan Poderzay
- Captain: Riese Zmolek
- Alternate captain(s): Dallas Gerads; Jack McNeely; Jared Spooner

The 2020–21 Minnesota State Mavericks men's ice hockey season was the 52nd season of play for the program, the 25th at the Division I level and the 22nd in the WCHA conference. The Mavericks represented Minnesota State University, Mankato and were coached by Mike Hastings, in his 9th season.

== Season ==
As a result of the ongoing COVID-19 pandemic the entire college ice hockey season was delayed. Because the NCAA had previously announced that all winter sports athletes would retain whatever eligibility they possessed through at least the following year, none of Minnesota State's players would lose a season of play. However, the NCAA also approved a change in its transfer regulations that would allow players to transfer and play immediately rather than having to sit out a season, as the rules previously required.

After missing out on a chance at postseason glory last year, Minnesota State didn't miss a beat and came into this year a house afire. The Mavericks won 9 of their first 11 games with Dryden McKay earning 6 shutouts. The second half of the regular season was nearly as outstanding as the first; MSU went 9–2 down the stretch and finished miles ahead of the second place team in the WCHA. With their record, the Mavericks were guaranteed a spot in the NCAA Tournament but could improve their ranking with a good performance in the conference tournament.

As the top seed, MSU played woeful Ferris State in the quarterfinals. The Mavericks' offense was quiet for much of the series but the defense was stout. Minnesota State surrendered one goal in two games and swept the Bulldogs. They faced an upstart Northern Michigan team in the semifinals and laid a complete egg. Northern Michigan scored the first five goals of the game, chasing McKay from the cage, and then played a defensive shell over the final 20 minutes to upset the Mavericks.

Losing in the semifinal cost MSU the chance to earn a #1 seed and they dropped all the way to 6th in the rankings. The team had to face Quinnipiac in the opening game and got off to a bad start. The Bobcats scored twice in the first while MSU could only muster 6 shots. The Mavericks woke up in the second and cut the lead in half near the end of the period. The third saw the team having to kill off a lengthy 2-man advantage only to surrender a goal a couple of minutes later. MSU bore down and scored with more than 5 minutes to play but, as time ticked away, the team was forced to pull McKay for an extra attacker and Cade Borchardt tied the game with 62 seconds remaining. The game went into overtime and, just like they had been in the third, Minnesota State was the aggressor. The Mavericks continued to put pressure on the Quinnipiac net until Ryan Sandelin banged in a loose puck and won the game for the Mavericks.

The win was the first tournament victory for Minnesota State at the Division I level, snapping a 6-game losing streak. The last NCAA Tournament win for the program had come 30 years earlier when the school was still called 'Mankato State University'

After the win, the team appeared to relax and played their next opponent, Minnesota, like the juggernaut they had been during the regular season. MSU held the Gophers, which had the #2 offense in the nation, to just 9 shots in the first two periods. The Mavericks scored twice in the opening frame and twice more in the third. McKay held the fort during Minnesota's attempted comeback in the final period but he surrendered nothing. The shutout was the 10th of the season for McKay, placing him just 2 behind Ryan Miller for the most in a career.

Minnesota State advanced to its first Frozen Four as the highest remaining seed and faced former WCHA rival St. Cloud State in the semifinal. McKay wasn't sharp in the game, allowing 3 goals in the first 23 minutes, but MSU fought back and took a 4–3 lead early in the third. The Huskies tied the game for the fourth time mid-way through the period but neither team seemed able to finish the scoring in regulation. With less than a minute to play St. Cloud deflected a puck into the net and MSU was unable to earn a tying goal, ending their season.

Tanner Edwards and Evan Foss sat out the season.

== Departures ==
Player	Position	Nationality	Cause
Jake Berger	Goaltender	United States	Transferred to St. Thomas
Josh French	Forward	United States	Graduation (signed with Knoxville Ice Bears)
Charlie Gerard	Forward	United States	Graduation (signed with Colorado Eagles)
Edwin Hookenson	Defenseman	Canada	Graduation (signed with Utah Grizzlies)
Connor Mackey	Defenseman	United States	Signed professional contract (Calgary Flames)
Marc Michaelis	Forward	Germany	Graduation (signed with Vancouver Canucks)
Nick Rivera	Defenseman	United States	Graduation (signed with Wheeling Nailers)
Ian Scheid	Defenseman	United States	Graduation (signed with Colorado Eagles)
Jaxson Stauber	Goaltender	United States	Transferred to Providence
Parker Tuomie	Forward	Germany	Graduation (signed with Eisbären Berlin)

== Recruiting ==
Player	Position	Nationality	Age	Notes
Todd Burgess	Forward	United States	24	Phoenix, AZ; graduate transfer from Rensselaer; Selected 103rd overall in 2016
Ryan Edquist	Goaltender	United States	22	Lakeville, MN; graduate transfer from Boston College
Tanner Edwards	Forward	United States	20	Anchorage, AK
Brendan Furry	Forward	United States	22	Toledo, OH
Connor Gregga	Forward	Canada	20	Markham, ON
Akito Hirose	Defenseman	Canada	21	Calgary, AB
Jake Livingstone	Defenseman	Canada	21	Creston, BC
Sam Morton	Forward	United States	21	Lafayette, CO; transfer from Union
Ondřej Pavel	Forward	Czech Republic	20	Prague, CZE

== Roster ==
As of December 17, 2020.

,

No.	Nat.	Player	Class	Pos	Height	Weight	DoB	Hometown	Previous team	NHL rights
2	(Canada)	Akito Hirose	Freshman	D	6' 0" (1.83 m)	170 lb (77 kg)	1999-04-09	Calgary, Alberta	Salmon Arm Silverbacks (BCHL)	—
3	(United States)	Jack McNeely (A)	Senior	D	6' 3" (1.91 m)	185 lb (84 kg)	1996-12-16	Lakeville, Minnesota	Muskegon Lumberjacks (USHL)	—
4	(United States)	Andy Carroll	Junior	D	5' 10" (1.78 m)	178 lb (81 kg)	1997-02-17	Northfield, Minnesota	Green Bay Gamblers (USHL)	—
5	(United States)	Jake Jaremko	Senior	F	6' 0" (1.83 m)	189 lb (86 kg)	1996-08-24	Nowthen, Minnesota	Chicago Steel (USHL)	—
6	(United States)	Sam Morton	Junior	D	6' 0" (1.83 m)	174 lb (79 kg)	1999-07-28	Lafayette, Colorado	Wenatchee Wild (BCHL)	—
7	(United States)	Wyatt Aamodt	Junior	D	5' 11" (1.8 m)	201 lb (91 kg)	1997-11-22	Hermantown, Minnesota	Lincoln Stars (USHL)	—
8	(United States)	Nathan Smith	Sophomore	F	6' 0" (1.83 m)	185 lb (84 kg)	1998-10-18	Hudson, Florida	Cedar Rapids RoughRiders (USHL)	WPG, 91st overall 2018
9	(United States)	Tanner Edwards	Freshman	F	6' 0" (1.83 m)	170 lb (77 kg)	2000-03-11	Anchorage, Alaska	Muskegon Lumberjacks (USHL)	—
10	(United States)	Shane McMahan	Junior	F	5' 11" (1.8 m)	201 lb (91 kg)	1996-07-30	Lakewood, Colorado	Fargo Force (USHL)	—
11	(United States)	Jared Spooner (A)	Senior	D	6' 0" (1.83 m)	196 lb (89 kg)	1996-03-22	Bismarck, North Dakota	Green Bay Gamblers (USHL)	—
12	(United States)	Colby Bukes	Sophomore	D	5' 11" (1.8 m)	178 lb (81 kg)	1999-02-01	Littleton, Colorado	Muskegon Lumberjacks (USHL)	—
13	(United States)	Brendan Furry	Freshman	F	6' 0" (1.83 m)	180 lb (82 kg)	1998-07-08	Toledo, Ohio	Tri-City Storm (USHL)	—
14	(United States)	Ryan Sandelin	Sophomore	F	6' 0" (1.83 m)	192 lb (87 kg)	1999-01-03	Hermantown, Minnesota	Penticton Vees (BCHL)	—
15	(Germany)	Julian Napravnik	Junior	F	5' 11" (1.8 m)	167 lb (76 kg)	1997-05-06	Bad Nauheim, Germany	Des Moines Buccaneers (USHL)	—
16	(United States)	Reggie Lutz	Senior	F	5' 10" (1.78 m)	178 lb (81 kg)	1996-10-18	Elk River, Minnesota	Chicago Steel (USHL)	—
17	(United States)	Walker Duehr	Senior	F	6' 2" (1.88 m)	211 lb (96 kg)	1997-11-23	Sioux Falls, South Dakota	Bloomington Thunder (USHL)	—
18	(Czech Republic)	Ondřej Pavel	Freshman	F	6' 2" (1.88 m)	205 lb (93 kg)	2000-08-29	Prague, Czech Republic	Fargo Force (USHL)	—
19	(Canada)	Chris Van Os-Shaw	Junior	F	6' 2" (1.88 m)	200 lb (91 kg)	1997-05-20	Regina, Saskatchewan	Spruce Grove Saints (AJHL)	—
20	(Canada)	Connor Gregga	Freshman	F	5' 10" (1.78 m)	175 lb (79 kg)	2000-07-24	Markham, Ontario	Coquitlam Express (BCHL)	—
21	(United States)	Lucas Sowder	Sophomore	F	5' 11" (1.8 m)	170 lb (77 kg)	1998-11-15	Trinity, Florida	Wenatchee Wild (BCHL)	—
22	(United States)	Dallas Gerads (A)	Senior	F	5' 10" (1.78 m)	195 lb (88 kg)	1996-06-01	Blaine, Minnesota	Dubuque Fighting Saints (USHL)	—
23	(Canada)	Jake Livingstone	Freshman	D	6' 4" (1.93 m)	205 lb (93 kg)	1999-04-16	Creston, British Columbia	Langley Rivermen (BCHL)	—
24	(United States)	Todd Burgess	Senior	F	6' 2" (1.88 m)	179 lb (81 kg)	1996-04-03	Phoenix, Arizona	Rensselaer (ECAC)	OTT, 103rd overall 2016
25	(United States)	Riese Zmolek (C)	Senior	D	6' 1" (1.85 m)	201 lb (91 kg)	1996-09-12	Rochester, Minnesota	Cedar Rapids RoughRiders (USHL)	—
27	(United States)	Tony Malinowski	Sophomore	D	6' 4" (1.93 m)	210 lb (95 kg)	1999-10-15	Clarkston, Michigan	Des Moines Buccaneers (USHL)	—
28	(United States)	Cade Borchardt	Sophomore	F	5' 10" (1.78 m)	175 lb (79 kg)	1998-07-06	Burnsville, Minnesota	Sioux Falls Stampede (USHL)	—
29	(United States)	Dryden McKay	Junior	G	5' 11" (1.8 m)	175 lb (79 kg)	1997-11-25	Downers Grove, Illinois	Madison Capitols (USHL)	—
33	(United States)	Evan Foss	Sophomore	G	5' 11" (1.8 m)	170 lb (77 kg)	2001-02-17	White Bear Lake, Minnesota	White Bear Lake High School (USHS–MN)	—
35	(United States)	Ryan Edquist	Senior	G	6' 0" (1.83 m)	172 lb (78 kg)	1998-01-28	Lakeville, Minnesota	Boston College (HEA)	—

== Standings ==
2020–21 Western Collegiate Hockey Association Standings
	Conference record										Overall record					
	GP	W	L	T	OTW	OTL	3/SW	PTS	GF	GA	GP	W	L	T	GF	GA
#4 Minnesota State †	14	13	1	0	1	1	0	39	56	15	27	22	5	1	100	46
#14 Lake Superior State *	14	9	5	0	2	2	0	27	39	34	29	19	7	3	86	63
#18 Bowling Green	14	8	5	1	0	2	0	27	46	34	31	20	10	1	108	67
#10 Bemidji State	14	8	5	1	3	2	0	24	42	34	29	16	10	3	82	70
Michigan Tech	14	7	7	0	1	0	0	20	38	35	30	17	12	1	78	63
Northern Michigan	14	6	7	1	2	2	1	20	40	47	29	11	17	1	79	103
Alabama–Huntsville	14	3	11	0	1	0	0	8	18	49	22	3	18	1	31	80
Ferris State	14	0	13	1	0	1	1	3	28	59	25	1	23	1	55	103
Alaska	0	-	-	-	-	-	-	-	-	-	0	-	-	-	-	-
Alaska Anchorage	0	-	-	-	-	-	-	-	-	-	0	-	-	-	-	-
Championship: March 20, 2021 † indicates conference regular season champion * indicates conference tournament champion Rankings: USCHO.com Top 20 Poll

== Schedule and results ==
Date	Time	Opponent^{#}	Rank^{#}	Site	TV	Decision	Result	Attendance	Record
Regular season
November 22	5:07 PM	at #16 Bemidji State*	#5	Sanford Center • Bemidji, Minnesota		McKay	W 5–0	105	1–0–0
December 6	5:07 PM	at Michigan Tech*	#6	MacInnes Student Ice Arena • Houghton, Michigan		McKay	L 1–3	0	1–1–0
December 7	4:07 PM	at Michigan Tech*	#6	MacInnes Student Ice Arena • Houghton, Michigan		McKay	W 2–0	0	2–1–0
December 18	7:37 PM	vs. Bemidji State*	#5	Mayo Clinic Health System Event Center • Mankato, Minnesota		McKay	W 5–4	0	3–1–0
December 19	5:07 PM	vs. Bemidji State*	#5	Mayo Clinic Health System Event Center • Mankato, Minnesota		Edquist	T 1–1 ^{SOW}	0	3–1–1
January 2	5:07 PM	at Northern Michigan	#5	Berry Events Center • Marquette, Michigan	FloHockey.tv	McKay	W 5–0	0	4–1–1 (1–0–0)
January 3	3:07 PM	at Northern Michigan	#5	Berry Events Center • Marquette, Michigan	FloHockey.tv	McKay	W 4–0	0	5–1–1 (2–0–0)
January 15	6:07 PM	at #19 Lake Superior State	#5	Taffy Abel Arena • Sault Ste. Marie, Michigan	FloHockey.tv	McKay	W 3–0	0	6–1–1 (3–0–0)
January 16	4:07 PM	at #19 Lake Superior State	#5	Taffy Abel Arena • Sault Ste. Marie, Michigan	FloHockey.tv	McKay	W 6–2	0	7–1–1 (4–0–0)
January 23	5:07 PM	vs. Ferris State	#2	Mayo Clinic Health System Event Center • Mankato, Minnesota	FloHockey.tv	McKay	W 4–0	0	8–1–1 (5–0–0)
January 24	3:07 PM	vs. Ferris State	#2	Mayo Clinic Health System Event Center • Mankato, Minnesota	FloHockey.tv	McKay	W 4–1	0	9–1–1 (6–0–0)
January 29	4:07 PM	at Bemidji State*	#3	Sanford Center • Bemidji, Minnesota		Edquist	L 1–4	25	9–2–1
February 5	7:07 PM	vs. #8 Bowling Green	#6	Mayo Clinic Health System Event Center • Mankato, Minnesota	FloHockey.tv	McKay	W 4–0	150	10–2–1 (7–0–0)
February 6	6:07 PM	vs. #8 Bowling Green	#6	Mayo Clinic Health System Event Center • Mankato, Minnesota	FloHockey.tv	McKay	W 5–1	150	11–2–1 (8–0–0)
February 11	7:07 PM	at Alabama–Huntsville	#3	Von Braun Center • Huntsville, Alabama	FloHockey.tv	McKay	W 4–1	888	12–2–1 (9–0–0)
February 12	7:07 PM	at Alabama–Huntsville	#3	Von Braun Center • Huntsville, Alabama	FloHockey.tv	McKay	W 5–0	1,281	13–2–1 (10–0–0)
February 19	6:07 PM	at Ferris State*	#3	Ewigleben Arena • Big Rapids, Michigan		Edquist	W 5–4 ^{OT}	215	14–2–1
February 20	6:07 PM	at Ferris State*	#3	Ewigleben Arena • Big Rapids, Michigan		McKay	W 5–1	250	15–2–1
February 25	7:07 PM	vs. #19 Bemidji State	#3	Mayo Clinic Health System Event Center • Mankato, Minnesota	FloHockey.tv	McKay	W 4–3 ^{OT}	250	16–2–1 (11–0–0)
February 27	6:07 PM	at #19 Bemidji State	#3	Sanford Center • Bemidji, Minnesota	FloHockey.tv	McKay	L 3–4 ^{OT}	150	16–3–1 (11–1–0)
March 5	6:07 PM	vs. #19 Michigan Tech	#4	Mayo Clinic Health System Event Center • Mankato, Minnesota	FloHockey.tv	McKay	W 2–1	250	17–3–1 (12–1–0)
March 6	6:07 PM	vs. #19 Michigan Tech	#4	Mayo Clinic Health System Event Center • Mankato, Minnesota	FloHockey.tv	McKay	W 3–2	250	18–3–1 (13–1–0)
WCHA Tournament
March 12	6:07 PM	vs. Ferris State*	#3	Mayo Clinic Health System Event Center • Mankato, Minnesota (WCHA quarterfinals Game 1)		McKay	W 3–0	250	19–3–1
March 13	4:07 PM	vs. Ferris State*	#3	Mayo Clinic Health System Event Center • Mankato, Minnesota (WCHA quarterfinals Game 2)		McKay	W 3–1	250	20–3–1
Minnesota State Won Series 2–0
March 19	2:07 PM	vs. Ferris State*	#3	Mayo Clinic Health System Event Center • Mankato, Minnesota (WCHA semifinals)		McKay	L 1–5	250	20–4–1
NCAA Tournament
March 27	3:00 PM	vs. #11 Quinnipiac*	#5	Budweiser Events Center • Loveland, Colorado (NCAA West Regional semifinals)	ESPN3	McKay	W 4–3 ^{OT}	101	21–4–1
March 29	7:00 PM	vs. #2 Minnesota*	#5	Budweiser Events Center • Loveland, Colorado (NCAA West Regional final)	ESPN2	McKay	W 4–0	175	22–4–1
April 8	4:00 PM	vs. #7 St. Cloud State*	#5	PPG Paints Arena • Pittsburgh, Pennsylvania (NCAA National semifinals)	ESPN2	McKay	L 4–5	3,660	22–5–1
*Non-conference game. ^{#}Rankings from USCHO.com Poll. All times are in Central Time.

== Scoring statistics ==
Name	Position	Games	Goals	Assists	Points	PIM
Julian Napravnik	RW	27	10	18	28	4
Nathan Smith	C	28	9	16	25	16
Cade Borchardt	F	28	9	15	24	10
Reggie Lutz	RW	25	10	11	21	33
Dallas Gerads	LW	28	9	10	19	31
Walker Duehr	RW	28	10	7	17	26
Jake Jaremko	C/LW	28	4	12	16	2
Akito Hirose	D	28	1	14	15	14
Todd Burgess	C/RW	25	5	9	14	6
Jake Livingstone	D	28	4	10	14	16
Brendan Furry	LW	28	5	8	13	19
Riese Zmolek	F	24	1	12	13	27
Ryan Sandelin	C	27	7	2	9	28
Sam Morton	F	17	5	4	9	6
Andy Carroll	D	26	3	6	9	4
Jared Spooner	LW	23	3	4	7	8
Wyatt Aamodt	D	28	2	5	7	10
Jack McNeely	D	27	1	5	6	8
Ondřej Pavel	C	11	0	4	4	8
Tony Malinowski	D	10	1	2	3	2
Shane McMahan	LW	16	1	2	3	12
Chris Van Os-Shaw	LW	11	0	1	1	23
Connor Gregga	F	1	0	0	0	0
Colby Bukes	D	3	0	0	0	0
Ryan Edquist	G	4	0	0	0	0
Lucas Sowder	LW	7	0	0	0	0
Dryden McKay	G	26	0	0	0	0
Bench	-	-	-	-	-	8
Total			100	177	277	321

== Goaltending statistics ==
Name	Games	Minutes	Wins	Losses	Ties	Goals against	Saves	Shut outs	SV %	GAA
Dryden McKay	26	1522	21	4	0	39	477	10	.924	1.54
Ryan Edquist	4	175	1	1	1	5	28	0	.848	1.71
Empty Net	-	9	-	-	-	2	-	-	-	-
Total	28	1707	22	5	1	46	505	10	.917	1.62

== Rankings ==
Poll	Week																					
Poll	Pre	1	2	3	4	5	6	7	8	9	10	11	12	13	14	15	16	17	18	19	20	21 (Final)
USCHO.com	4	5	6	6	6	5	5	5	4	5	2	3	6	3	3	3	4	3	3	5	-	4
USA Today	5	4	5	6	6	5	5	5	4	4	2	2	4	3	3	3	4	3	3	6	1	3

USCHO did not release a poll in week 20.

== Awards and honors ==
Player	Award	Ref
Mike Hastings	Spencer Penrose Award	
Dryden McKay	AHCA West Second Team All-American	
Nathan Smith	NCAA All-Tournament Team	
Dryden McKay	WCHA Player of the Year	
Julian Napravnik	WCHA Offensive Player of the Year	
Dryden McKay	WCHA Goaltender of the Year	
Akito Hirose	WCHA Rookie of the Year	
Mike Hastings	WCHA Coach of the Year	
Dryden McKay	WCHA First Team	
Julian Napravnik	WCHA First Team	
Nathan Smith	WCHA Second Team	
Akito Hirose	WCHA Third Team	
Riese Zmolek	WCHA Third Team	
Akito Hirose	WCHA Rookie Team	
Jake Livingstone	WCHA Rookie Team	
