= 2020–21 Lake Superior State Lakers men's ice hockey season =

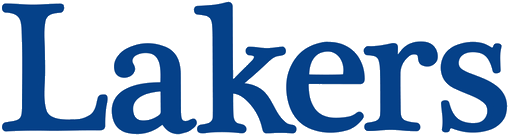

WCHA Tournament, Champion NCAA Tournament, Regional semifinal
- Conference: 2nd WCHA
- Home ice: Taffy Abel Arena

Rankings
- USCHO.com: 14
- USA Today/ US Hockey Magazine: 13

Record
- Overall: 19–7–3
- Conference: 9–5–0–2–2–0
- Home: 9–4–3
- Road: 8–2–0
- Neutral: 2–1–0

Coaches and captains
- Head coach: Damon Whitten
- Assistant coaches: Mike York; Zack Cisek; Mike Gugin
- Captain: Lukas Kälble
- Alternate captain(s): Ashton Calder; Hampus Eriksson; Will Riedell

The 2020–21 Lake Superior State Lakers men's ice hockey season was the 55th season of play for the program, the 48th at the Division I level and the 8th in the WCHA conference. The Lakers represented Lake Superior State University and were coached by Damon Whitten, in his 7th season.

== Season ==
As a result of the ongoing COVID-19 pandemic the entire college ice hockey season was delayed. Because the NCAA had previously announced that all winter sports athletes would retain whatever eligibility they possessed through at least the following year, none of Lake Superior State's players would lose a season of play. However, the NCAA also approved a change in its transfer regulations that would allow players to transfer and play immediately rather than having to sit out a season, as the rules previously required.

After a poor season the year before, Lake Superior saw a great deal of roster turnover. At the start of the season the altered lineup seemed to be performing well; the team lost just once in their first ten games, though the strength of their opposition (or lack thereof) did contribute to their record. Their schedule was part of the reason why the Lakers were ranked 19th when they began conference play and, due to casing the WCHA's top team, they swiftly found themselves outside the top-20. Lake Superior didn't go away, however; the team flirted with the ranking for the remainder of the regular season. The Lakers ended with a much-improved record of 15–6–3, mostly on the strength of senior netminder Mareks Mitens and receiving 170 fewer penalty minutes than the year before (which averaged to about 1 fewer power play against every other game). With both the team's offense and defense playing better than it had in years, the Lakers finished tied for second in the WCHA, the best result for LSSU since 1996.

Even with their record and finish, the Lakers were still ranked outside the top 15 and needed a good performance in the WCHA tournament to get into the conversation. As the second seed, the Lakers began at home against Alabama–Huntsville and dispatched the Chargers fairly easily. In the semifinals, Lake Superior took on Bemidji State with their season on the line and the defense completely shut down the Beavers. Lake State scored the first four goals of the game and Mitens didn't surrender a single goal until 4 minutes remained, even then it only came on a BSU power play with their goalie pulled. The Lakers received a gift by facing 6th-seeded Northern Michigan for the championship. Lake Superior took full advantage by against scoring the first four goals and then coasted to a 6–3 win. it was the program's first conference title since 1995 and the automatic bid allowed the Lakers into the NCAA Tournament for the first time since 1996.

Lake Superior received a 3-seed and were set opposite Massachusetts. Unfortunately, the Minutemen were the hottest team in the country, not having lost a game since mid-January, and it showed from the very start. UMass was the aggressor, scoring first, and despite a tying goal by Lake State at the end of the first the Lakers looked like they were following the play. UMass broke the game open in the second, outshooting LSSU 18–7 and scoring twice to take the lead. The Lakers picked up their game in the third but the oppressive defense by Massachusetts prevented Lake Superior from denting the twine and two more goals against put the game out of reach. Even with poor finish, this season can't be considered anything but a resounding success for the Lakers.

Niko Esposito-Selivanov sat out the season.

== Departures ==
Player	Position	Nationality	Cause
Tyler Anderson	Defenseman	Canada	Left program
Bryan Basilico	Forward	United States	Graduation
Roman Bengert	Goaltender	Japan	Transferred to Prince Edward Island
Roberts Bļugers	Defenseman	Latvia	Transferred to Alaska
Brayden Gelsinger	Forward	Canada	Graduation (signed with Utah Grizzlies)
Owen Guy	Forward	Canada	Left program
Max Humitz	Forward	United States	Graduation (signed with Grand Rapids Griffins)
Ian Johnston	Forward	Canada	Graduation
Brendan McKay	Forward	Canada	Graduation
Colin Saccoman	Defenseman	United States	Graduation
Alec Semandel	Defenseman	United States	Transferred to New Hampshire

== Recruiting ==
Player	Position	Nationality	Age	Notes
Jacob Bengtsson	Forward/Defenseman	Sweden	21	Stockholm, SWE
Artyom Borshyov	Defenseman	Belarus	20	Vitebsk, BLR
Spencer DenBeste	Forward	United States	21	Sault Ste. Marie, MI
Jeremy Gervais	Defenseman	Canada	21	Prince George, BC
Jack Jeffers	Forward	Canada	22	Oakville, ON; transfer from Alabama–Huntsville
Ethan Langenegger	Goaltender	Canada	20	Kamloops, BC
Benito Posa	Forward	United States	21	Grand Blanc, MI
Brandon Puricelli	Forward	United States	22	Ellisville, MO; transfer from Minnesota–Duluth
Joshua Wildauer	Forward	United States	21	Dearborn Heights, MI
Tyler Williams	Forward	United States	21	South Lyon, MI

== Roster ==
As of October 14, 2020.

No.	Nat.	Player	Class	Pos	Height	Weight	DoB	Hometown	Previous team	NHL rights
1	(Canada)	Ethan Langenegger	Freshman	G	6' 0" (1.83 m)	187 lb (85 kg)	2000-09-10	Kamloops, British Columbia	Salmon Arm Silverbacks (BCHL)	—
2	(Canada)	Michael Mannara	Sophomore	D	5' 10" (1.78 m)	190 lb (86 kg)	1999-03-21	Caledon, Ontario	Trenton Golden Hawks (OJHL)	—
3	(United States)	Will Riedell (A)	Senior	D	6' 2" (1.88 m)	198 lb (90 kg)	1996-10-09	Greensboro, North Carolina	New Jersey Titans (NAHL)	—
4	(Sweden)	Jacob Bengtsson	Freshman	D	6' 3" (1.91 m)	202 lb (92 kg)	1999-05-08	Stockholm, Sweden	Waterloo Black Hawks (USHL)	—
5	(Sweden)	Arvid Henrikson	Sophomore	D	6' 5" (1.96 m)	211 lb (96 kg)	1998-02-23	Stockholm, Sweden	Austin Bruins (NAHL)	MTL, 187th overall 2016
7	(Canada)	Mitchell Oliver	Junior	D	6' 0" (1.83 m)	195 lb (88 kg)	1997-06-17	Kelowna, British Columbia	Alberni Valley Bulldogs (BCHL)	—
8	(United States)	Dustin Manz	Sophomore	F	5' 10" (1.78 m)	194 lb (88 kg)	1999-09-21	Vanderbilt, Michigan	Prince George Spruce Kings (BCHL)	—
9	(Canada)	Alex Ambrosio	Senior	F	5' 10" (1.78 m)	175 lb (79 kg)	1997-03-12	Burnaby, British Columbia	Coquitlam Express (BCHL)	—
10	(Slovakia)	Miroslav Mucha	Junior	F	6' 1" (1.85 m)	197 lb (89 kg)	1997-10-07	Bytča, Slovakia	Minot Minotauros (NAHL)	—
11	(United States)	Niko Esposito-Selivanov	Sophomore	F	5' 10" (1.78 m)	180 lb (82 kg)	1998-09-23	St. Petersburg, Florida	Cowichan Valley Capitals (BCHL)	—
12	(United States)	Brandon Puricelli	Sophomore	F	5' 10" (1.78 m)	180 lb (82 kg)	1998-02-04	Ellisville, Missouri	Minnesota Duluth (NCHC)	—
13	(United States)	Sepncer DenBeste	Freshman	F	6' 1" (1.85 m)	185 lb (84 kg)	1999-02-17	Marquette, Michigan	Johnstown Tomahawks (NAHL)	—
14	(Japan)	Yuki Miura	Senior	F	5' 11" (1.8 m)	170 lb (77 kg)	1996-07-19	Tokyo, Japan	Waterloo Black Hawks (USHL)	—
15	(Sweden)	Jacob Nordqvist	Junior	D	5' 9" (1.75 m)	181 lb (82 kg)	1998-02-12	Gothenburg, Sweden	Madison Capitols (USHL)	—
16	(United States)	Ashton Calder (A)	Junior	F	6' 1" (1.85 m)	201 lb (91 kg)	1998-02-09	Sault Ste. Marie, Michigan	Lincoln Stars (USHL)	—
17	(United States)	Chase Gamelin	Senior	F	5' 11" (1.8 m)	183 lb (83 kg)	1996-07-20	Sault Ste. Marie, Michigan	Brookings Blizzard (NAHL)	—
19	(United States)	Joshua Wildauer	Freshman	F	5' 8" (1.73 m)	170 lb (77 kg)	1999-06-16	Dearborn Heights, Michigan	Coquitlam Express (BCHL)	—
20	(Canada)	Jack Jeffers	Junior	F	6' 0" (1.83 m)	180 lb (82 kg)	1997-09-21	Oakville, Ontario	Alabama Huntsville (WCHA)	—
21	(United States)	Tyler Williams	Freshman	F	5' 7" (1.7 m)	175 lb (79 kg)	2000-05-16	South Lyon, Michigan	Nanaimo Clippers (BCHL)	—
22	(Germany)	Lukas Kaelble (C)	Senior	D	6' 1" (1.85 m)	209 lb (95 kg)	1997-10-13	Mannheim, Germany	Fargo Force (USHL)	—
24	(Sweden)	Hampus Eriksson (A)	Senior	F	6' 6" (1.98 m)	211 lb (96 kg)	1996-09-11	Forsbacka, Sweden	Fairbanks Ice Dogs (NAHL)	—
25	(Canada)	Jeremy Gervais	Freshman	D	5' 11" (1.8 m)	180 lb (82 kg)	1999-01-09	Prince George, British Columbia	Salmon Arm Silverbacks (BCHL)	—
26	(Canada)	Pete Veillette	Junior	F	5' 9" (1.75 m)	170 lb (77 kg)	1997-02-26	Drummondville, Quebec	Ottawa Jr. Senators (CCHL)	—
27	(United States)	Benito Posa	Freshman	F	6' 1" (1.85 m)	190 lb (86 kg)	1999-01-16	Grand Blanc, Michigan	Des Moines Buccaneers (USHL)	—
29	(France)	Louis Boudon	Sophomore	F	5' 11" (1.8 m)	172 lb (78 kg)	1998-10-04	Grenoble, France	Northeast Generals (NAHL)	—
30	(Latvia)	Mareks Mitens	Senior	G	6' 1" (1.85 m)	185 lb (84 kg)	1998-01-29	Ventspils, Latvia	Aston Rebels (NAHL)	—
31	(United States)	Seth Eisele	Sophomore	G	6' 5" (1.96 m)	195 lb (88 kg)	1998-10-30	Lake Elmo, Minnesota	Lone Star Brahmas (NAHL)	—

== Standings ==
2020–21 Western Collegiate Hockey Association Standings
	Conference record										Overall record					
	GP	W	L	T	OTW	OTL	3/SW	PTS	GF	GA	GP	W	L	T	GF	GA
#4 Minnesota State †	14	13	1	0	1	1	0	39	56	15	27	22	5	1	100	46
#14 Lake Superior State *	14	9	5	0	2	2	0	27	39	34	29	19	7	3	86	63
#18 Bowling Green	14	8	5	1	0	2	0	27	46	34	31	20	10	1	108	67
#10 Bemidji State	14	8	5	1	3	2	0	24	42	34	29	16	10	3	82	70
Michigan Tech	14	7	7	0	1	0	0	20	38	35	30	17	12	1	78	63
Northern Michigan	14	6	7	1	2	2	1	20	40	47	29	11	17	1	79	103
Alabama–Huntsville	14	3	11	0	1	0	0	8	18	49	22	3	18	1	31	80
Ferris State	14	0	13	1	0	1	1	3	28	59	25	1	23	1	55	103
Alaska	0	-	-	-	-	-	-	-	-	-	0	-	-	-	-	-
Alaska Anchorage	0	-	-	-	-	-	-	-	-	-	0	-	-	-	-	-
Championship: March 20, 2021 † indicates conference regular season champion * indicates conference tournament champion Rankings: USCHO.com Top 20 Poll

== Schedule and results ==
Date	Time	Opponent^{#}	Rank^{#}	Site	TV	Decision	Result	Attendance	Record
Regular season
November 21	4:54 PM	vs. Michigan Tech*		Taffy Abel Arena • Sault Ste. Marie, Michigan		Mitens	T 0–0 ^{SOW}	8	0–0–1
November 22	3:07 PM	vs. Michigan Tech*		Taffy Abel Arena • Sault Ste. Marie, Michigan		Eisele	W 4–1	0	1–0–1
November 27	7:07 PM	vs. Adrian*		Taffy Abel Arena • Sault Ste. Marie, Michigan		Mitens	W 5–3	0	2–0–1
November 29	2:05 PM	at Adrian*		Arrington Ice Arena • Adrian, Michigan		Mitens	W 2–1	0	3–0–1
December 5	5:07 PM	vs. Alabama–Huntsville*		Taffy Abel Arena • Sault Ste. Marie, Michigan		Mitens	T 2–2 ^{SOW}	0	3–0–2
December 6	3:07 PM	vs. Alabama–Huntsville*		Taffy Abel Arena • Sault Ste. Marie, Michigan		Langenegger	W 3–2	0	4–0–2
January 2	5:00 PM	vs. Bemidji State*	#19	Taffy Abel Arena • Sault Ste. Marie, Michigan		Mitens	L 1–4	0	4–1–2
January 3	3:00 PM	vs. Bemidji State*	#19	Taffy Abel Arena • Sault Ste. Marie, Michigan		Mitens	T 2–2 ^{SOW}	0	4–1–3
January 8	7:07 PM	at Northern Michigan*		Berry Events Center • Marquette, Michigan		Mitens	W 4–1	0	5–1–3
January 9	6:07 PM	at Northern Michigan*		Berry Events Center • Marquette, Michigan		Mitens	W 3–2 ^{OT}	0	6–1–3
January 15	7:07 PM	vs. #5 Minnesota State	#19	Taffy Abel Arena • Sault Ste. Marie, Michigan	FloHockey.tv	Mitens	L 0–3	0	6–2–3 (0–1–0)
January 15	7:07 PM	vs. #5 Minnesota State	#19	Taffy Abel Arena • Sault Ste. Marie, Michigan	FloHockey.tv	Mitens	L 2–6	0	6–3–3 (0–2–0)
February 6	5:00 PM	vs. Northern Michigan		Taffy Abel Arena • Sault Ste. Marie, Michigan	FloHockey.tv	Eisele	W 5–4 ^{OT}	0	7–3–3 (1–2–0)
February 7	3:00 PM	vs. Northern Michigan		Taffy Abel Arena • Sault Ste. Marie, Michigan	FloHockey.tv	Langenegger	L 3–4 ^{OT}	0	7–4–3 (1–3–0)
February 12	7:07 PM	at #12 Bowling Green		Slater Family Ice Arena • Bowling Green, Ohio	FloHockey.tv	Mitens	W 2–1 ^{OT}	300	8–4–3 (2–3–0)
February 13	7:07 PM	at #12 Bowling Green		Slater Family Ice Arena • Bowling Green, Ohio	FloHockey.tv	Mitens	W 5–2	300	9–4–3 (3–3–0)
February 16	7:07 PM	at #18 Michigan Tech	#20	MacInnes Student Ice Arena • Houghton, Michigan	FloHockey.tv	Mitens	W 3–1	300	10–4–3 (4–3–0)
February 19	7:00 PM	vs. Alabama–Huntsville	#20	Taffy Abel Arena • Sault Ste. Marie, Michigan	FloHockey.tv	Mitens	W 2–1	0	11–4–3 (5–3–0)
February 20	5:00 PM	vs. Alabama–Huntsville	#20	Taffy Abel Arena • Sault Ste. Marie, Michigan	FloHockey.tv	Langenegger	W 4–1	0	12–4–3 (6–3–0)
February 23	2:07 PM	at #20 Michigan Tech	#18	MacInnes Student Ice Arena • Houghton, Michigan	FloHockey.tv	Mitens	L 1–4	300	12–5–3 (6–4–0)
February 26	7:07 PM	at Ferris State	#18	Ewigleben Arena • Big Rapids, Michigan	FloHockey.tv	Mitens	W 4–2	250	13–5–3 (7–4–0)
March 2	7:07 PM	at #17 Bemidji State	#20	Sanford Center • Bemidji, Minnesota	FloHockey.tv	Mitens	L 1–2 ^{OT}	250	13–6–3 (7–5–0)
March 3	5:07 PM	at #17 Bemidji State	#20	Sanford Center • Bemidji, Minnesota	FloHockey.tv	Mitens	W 5–2	250	14–6–3 (8–5–0)
March 6	3:07 PM	at Ferris State	#20	Taffy Abel Arena • Sault Ste. Marie, Michigan	FloHockey.tv	Mitens	W 2–1	0	15–6–3 (9–5–0)
WCHA Tournament
March 12	7:07 PM	vs. Alabama–Huntsville*	#18	Taffy Abel Arena • Sault Ste. Marie, Michigan (WCHA quarterfinals Game 1)		Mitens	W 6–1	0	16–6–3
March 13	5:07 PM	vs. Alabama–Huntsville*	#18	Taffy Abel Arena • Sault Ste. Marie, Michigan (WCHA quarterfinals Game 2)		Eisele	W 4–1	0	17–6–3
Lake Superior State Won Series 2–0
March 19	8:37 PM	vs. #13 Bemidji State*	#17	Mayo Clinic Health System Event Center • Mankato, Minnesota (WCHA Semifinal)		Mitens	W 4–1	250	18–6–3
March 20	8:07 PM	vs. Northern Michigan*	#17	Mayo Clinic Health System Event Center • Mankato, Minnesota (WCHA Championship)		Mitens	W 6–3	250	19–6–3
NCAA Tournament
March 26	6:30 PM	vs. #6 Massachusetts*	#13	Webster Bank Arena • Bridgeport, Connecticut (NCAA East Regional semifinal)	ESPNU	Beydoun	L 1–5	100	19–7–3
*Non-conference game. ^{#}Rankings from USCHO.com Poll. All times are in Eastern Time.

== Scoring statistics ==
Name	Position	Games	Goals	Assists	Points	PIM
Ashton Calder	F	29	16	13	29	20
Pete Veillette	C	29	13	14	27	4
Louis Boudon	C	27	8	11	19	14
Hampus Eriksson	C/W	27	6	13	19	16
Will Riedell	D	29	6	11	17	18
Brandon Puricelli	RW	28	8	7	15	37
Jacob Nordqvist	D	29	3	12	15	10
Lukas Kälble	D	27	2	13	15	16
Miroslav Mucha	RW	29	5	9	14	4
Yuki Miura	C	29	4	8	12	4
Mitchell Oliver	D	25	3	7	10	8
Benito Posa	F	20	4	5	9	28
Jack Jeffers	F	28	2	7	9	23
Jacob Bengtsson	C/D	38	2	5	7	26
Dustin Manz	C	29	2	5	7	10
Chase Gamelin	F	29	1	3	4	0
Alexandro Ambrosio	F	29	1	3	4	14
Jeremy Gervais	D	16	0	2	2	0
Seth Eisele	G	4	0	1	1	0
Joshua Wildauer	C	13	0	1	1	4
Mareks Mitens	G	25	0	1	1	0
Arvid Henrikson	D	29	0	1	1	27
Spencer DenBeste	F	1	0	0	0	0
Michael Mannara	D	2	0	0	0	0
Tyler Williams	C	3	0	0	0	2
Ethan Langenegger	G	6	0	0	0	0
Artyom Borshyov	D	13	0	0	0	6
Bench	-	-	-	-	-	18
Total			86	152	238	309

== Goaltending statistics ==
Name	Games	Minutes	Wins	Losses	Ties	Goals against	Saves	Shut outs	SV %	GAA
Mareks Mitens	25	1380	14	6	3	45	602	1	.930	1.96
Seth Eisele	4	165	3	0	0	6	62	0	.912	2.18
Ethan Langenegger	6	211	2	1	0	8	77	0	.906	2.27
Empty Net	-	8	-	-	-	4	-	-	-	-
Total	29	1765	19	7	3	63	741	1	.922	2.14

== Rankings ==
Poll	Week																					
Poll	Pre	1	2	3	4	5	6	7	8	9	10	11	12	13	14	15	16	17	18	19	20	21 (Final)
USCHO.com	NR	NR	NR	NR	NR	NR	20	19	NR	19	NR	NR	NR	NR	20	18	20	18	17	13	-	14
USA Today	NR	NR	NR	NR	NR	NR	NR	NR	NR	NR	NR	NR	NR	NR	NR	NR	NR	NR	NR	13	13	13

USCHO did not release a poll in week 20.

== Awards and honors ==
Player	Award	Ref
Ashton Calder	WCHA Most Outstanding Player in Tournament	
Mareks Mitens	WCHA Second Team	
Will Riedell	WCHA Second Team	
Ashton Calder	WCHA Second Team	
Pete Veillette	WCHA Third Team	
