= 2020–21 Alaska Anchorage Seawolves men's ice hockey season =

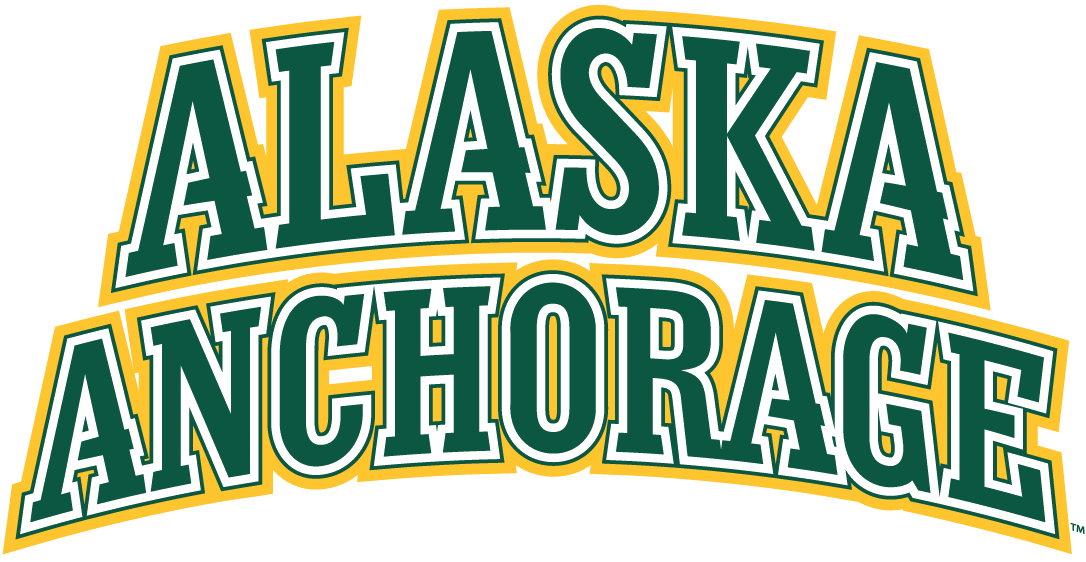
- Conference: WCHA
- Home ice: Wells Fargo Sports Complex

Rankings
- USCHO: NR
- USA Today: NR

Record

Coaches and captains
- Head coach: Matt Curley
- Assistant coaches: Matt Bruneteau; P. D. Melgoza

The 2020–21 Alaska Anchorage Seawolves men's ice hockey season would have been the 42nd season of play for the program, the 37th at the Division I level and the 28th in the WCHA conference. The Seawolves represent the University of Alaska Anchorage.

== Season ==
In the summer of 2020, the university announced that the men's ice hockey program would be terminated following the 2020–21 season. The move came as a result from many years of poor attendance and the announcement by 7 members of the 10-team WCHA to leave the conference. A year earlier, due to the decline in revenue for the state, there were rumors that the Seawolves would merge their program with the one in Fairbanks, but nothing came to fruition. The end result was that Alaska Anchorage could no longer support several of its programs and, despite once being the cornerstone of the athletic department, the expensive ice hockey team was scheduled for a swan song in 2021.

Before a single game could be played, however, the COVID-19 pandemic made playing the season untenable. In November, Alaska Anchorage suspended all of its indoor sports due to the increased likelihood of spreading the virus. The cancellation effectively ended the program, although a group of alumni, boosters and residents had been attempting to put together a large donation to keep the team running for at least two years. By mid-December, more than $1 million had been raised with a goal of securing $1.5 million and an additional $1.5 million in pledges by February 21, however, the team's future was undetermined.

== Departures ==
Player	Position	Nationality	Cause
Luc Brown	Forward	Canada	Graduation (Signed with Greenville Swamp Rabbits)
Carmine Buono	Defenseman	Canada	Left Program
Trey deGraaf	Forward	Canada	Left Program
Dante Fantauzzi	Defenseman	Canada	Returned to Juniors (Sioux Falls Stampede)
Alex Frye	Forward	United States	Transfer (Northern Michigan)
Drake Glover	Forward	United States	Signed Professional Contract (Fayetteville Marksmen)
Tomi Hiekkavirta	Defenseman	Finland	Graduation
Taylor Lantz	Forward	United States	Left Program
Marcus Mitchell	Forward	Canada	Transfer (SUNY Plattsburgh)
Zack Nazzarett	Forward	United States	Returned to Juniors (New Jersey Junior Titans)
Nolan Nicholas	Defenseman	Canada	Graduation
Brandon Perrone	Goaltender	United States	Transfer (Long Island)
Cory Renwick	Forward	Canada	Graduation
Tanner Schachle	Forward	United States	Transfer (Long Island)
Eric Sinclair	Defenseman	Canada	Left Program
Joe Sofo	Forward	United States	Transfer (St. Thomas)
Rylee St. Onge	Forward	Canada	Transfer (Mercyhurst)
David Trinkberger	Defenseman	Germany	Graduation (Signed with Nürnberg Ice Tigers)
Nick Wicks	Forward	Canada	Transfer (Clarkson)

== Recruiting ==
Player	Position	Nationality	Age	Notes
Tyrell Boucher	Defenseman	Canada	20	Grande Prairie, AB; transferred to Northern Michigan
Ethan Gauer	Defenseman	Latvia	20	Farmington, MN; transferred to Bemidji State
Olivier Gauthier	Forward	Canada	21	Ferme-Neuve, PQ
Wyatt Head	Defenseman	Canada	21	Kelowna, BC; transferred to Mercyhurst
Zach Krajnik	Forward	United States	21	Eagle River, AK; transferred to Minnesota State
Chong-min Lee	Forward	South Korea	21	Seoul, KOR; Left Program
Josh Martin	Defenseman	United States	21	Brownstown, MI; transferred to Alabama–Huntsville
Michael Muschitiello	Forward	United States	21	St. James, NY; Left Program
Devon Mussio	Defenseman	Canada	21	Vancouver, BC; transferred to Mercyhurst
Daniel Rybarik	Forward	Canada	21	Calgary, AB
Porter Schachle	Forward	United States	19	Wasilla, AK; Returned to Juniors
Preston Weeks	Defenseman	United States	21	Soldotna, AK

== Roster ==
As of February 2, 2021.

No.	Nat.	Player	Class	Pos	Height	Weight	DoB	Hometown	Previous team	NHL rights
3	(United States)	Andrew Lane	Junior	D	5' 9" (1.75 m)	170 lb (77 kg)	1997-02-19	Howell, Michigan	Shreveport Mudbugs (NAHL)	—
4	(Canada)	Troy Robillard	Sophomore	D	6' 3" (1.91 m)	208 lb (94 kg)	1998-10-12	Coquitlam, British Columbia	Coquitlam Express (BCHL)	—
8	(Canada)	Drayson Pears	Junior	D	6' 0" (1.83 m)	190 lb (86 kg)	1998-03-09	Shawnigan Lake, British Columbia	Victoria Grizzlies (BCHL)	—
14	(Canada)	Jared Nash	Junior	F	5' 11" (1.8 m)	195 lb (88 kg)	1998-01-16	Stratford, Ontario	Penticton Vees (SJHL)	—
16	(Canada)	Zach Court	Junior	F	5' 10" (1.78 m)	186 lb (84 kg)	1997-01-04	Winnipeg, Manitoba	Merritt Centennials (BCHL)	—
17	(Canada)	Zac Masson	Senior	F	6' 2" (1.88 m)	205 lb (93 kg)	1996-02-06	Newmarket, Ontario	Langley Rivermen (BCHL)	—
18	(Canada)	Daniel Rybarik	Freshman	F	5' 10" (1.78 m)	195 lb (88 kg)	1999-02-20	Calgary, Alberta	Salmon Arm Silverbacks (BCHL)	—
22	(Canada)	Olivier Gauthier	Freshman	F	5' 10" (1.78 m)	185 lb (84 kg)	1999-04-09	Mont-Tremblant, Quebec	Cowichan Valley Capitals (BCHL)	—
26	(United States)	Aaron McPheters	Senior	D	5' 8" (1.73 m)	164 lb (74 kg)	1997-03-25	Anchorage, Alaska	Fairbanks Ice Dogs (NAHL)	—
29	(United States)	Preston Weeks	Freshman	D	6' 3" (1.91 m)	205 lb (93 kg)	1999-04-05	Soldotna, Alaska	Kenai River Brown Bears (NAHL)	—
30	(United States)	Kris Carlson	Senior	G	6' 2" (1.88 m)	196 lb (89 kg)	1997-08-19	Centreville, Virginia	New Jersey Hitmen (USPHL)	—
39	(Canada)	Kristian Stead	Senior	G	6' 2" (1.88 m)	192 lb (87 kg)	1996-10-17	Merritt, British Columbia	Nipawin Hawks (SJHL)	—
40	(Canada)	Brayden Camrud	Sophomore	F	5' 8" (1.73 m)	175 lb (79 kg)	1998-07-24	Saskatoon, Saskatchewan	Humboldt Broncos (SJHL)	—

== Standings ==
2020–21 Western Collegiate Hockey Association Standings
	Conference record										Overall record					
	GP	W	L	T	OTW	OTL	3/SW	PTS	GF	GA	GP	W	L	T	GF	GA
#4 Minnesota State †	14	13	1	0	1	1	0	39	56	15	27	22	5	1	100	46
#14 Lake Superior State *	14	9	5	0	2	2	0	27	39	34	29	19	7	3	86	63
#18 Bowling Green	14	8	5	1	0	2	0	27	46	34	31	20	10	1	108	67
#10 Bemidji State	14	8	5	1	3	2	0	24	42	34	29	16	10	3	82	70
Michigan Tech	14	7	7	0	1	0	0	20	38	35	30	17	12	1	78	63
Northern Michigan	14	6	7	1	2	2	1	20	40	47	29	11	17	1	79	103
Alabama–Huntsville	14	3	11	0	1	0	0	8	18	49	22	3	18	1	31	80
Ferris State	14	0	13	1	0	1	1	3	28	59	25	1	23	1	55	103
Alaska	0	-	-	-	-	-	-	-	-	-	0	-	-	-	-	-
Alaska Anchorage	0	-	-	-	-	-	-	-	-	-	0	-	-	-	-	-
Championship: March 20, 2021 † indicates conference regular season champion * indicates conference tournament champion Rankings: USCHO.com Top 20 Poll

== Schedule and results ==
Season Cancelled
