= 2020–21 Bowling Green Falcons men's ice hockey season =

- Conference: 3rd WCHA
- Home ice: Slater Family Ice Arena

Rankings
- USCHO.com: 18
- USA Today/ US Hockey Magazine: NR

Record
- Overall: 20–10–1
- Conference: 8–5–1–0–2–0
- Home: 10–6–0
- Road: 10–4–1
- Neutral: 0–0–0

Coaches and captains
- Head coach: Ty Eigner
- Assistant coaches: Curtis Carr; Maco Balkovec
- Captain: Connor Ford
- Alternate captain(s): Alex Barber; Brandon Kruse

The 2020–21 Bowling Green Falcons men's ice hockey season was the 52nd season of play for the program and the 8th in the WCHA conference. The Falcons represented Bowling Green State University and were coached by Ty Eigner, in his 2nd season.

== Season ==
As a result of the ongoing COVID-19 pandemic the entire college ice hockey season was delayed. Because the NCAA had previously announced that all winter sports athletes would retain whatever eligibility they possessed through at least the following year, none of Bowling Green's players would lose a season of play. However, the NCAA also approved a change in its transfer regulations that would allow players to transfer and play immediately rather than having to sit out a season, as the rules previously required.

Despite COVID concerns, Bowling Green was able to play several non-WCHA teams early in the year and propelled themselves into the top-10 with a fantastic start. The Falcons won 12 of their first 13 games, including an impressive series sweep of Quinnipiac, and rose to the #5 ranking by mid-January. Unfortunately, when Bowling Green began facing stiff competition, the offense dropped off dramatically. Over a 4-week stretch, the Falcons went 2–6, losing the six games against teams that finished the season ranked. In those games the team scored just 6 goals. While the defense wasn't particularly bad, it wasn't good either. Bowling Green recovered with a 3–0–1 run to end the season but the damage had been done.

Even with a 19–8–1 record, the Falcons had fallen to 13th in the rankings and were considered a 'bubble team', since they possessed a 1–7 record against the other top teams in the WCHA. To get themselves an NCAA Tournament bid, the team would need a good performance in their conference tournament. BG got off to a bad start, losing the opening game 3–4 to Northern Michigan, but rebounded with resounding 5–0 win. The turnaround didn't last long, however, and the Falcons dropped the deciding game 1–5. The team was ranked 16th the following poll and were passed over in favor of Notre Dame, who were just 1 game over .500.

== Departures ==
Player	Position	Nationality	Cause
Jacob Dalton	Defenseman	United States	Graduation
Frédéric Letourneau	Forward	Canada	Graduation (signed with South Carolina Stingrays)
Casey Linkenheld	Forward	United States	Graduation
Alec Rauhauser	Defenseman	United States	Graduation (signed with Florida Panthers)

== Recruiting ==
Player	Position	Nationality	Age	Notes
Chrystopher Collin	Forward	Canada	21	Boisbriand, QC
Max Coyle	Defenseman	Canada	22	Tillsonburg, ON; transfer from Alabama–Huntsville
Seth Fyten	Forward	Canada	19	Sundre, AB; Selected 142nd overall in 2020
Ethan Scardina	Forward	Canada	19	White Rock, BC
Anton Malmström	Defenseman	Sweden	20	Österhaninge, SWE

== Roster ==
As of September 8, 2020.

No.	Nat.	Player	Class	Pos	Height	Weight	DoB	Hometown	Previous team	NHL rights
2	(United States)	Will Cullen	Junior	D	6' 0" (1.83 m)	184 lb (83 kg)	1996-07-24	Pelham Manor, New York	Carleton Place Canadians (CCHL)	—
3	(United States)	Carson Musser	Senior	D	6' 1" (1.85 m)	191 lb (87 kg)	1997-04-21	Grand Rapids, Michigan	Fargo Force (USHL)	—
4	(United States)	Garrett Daly	Sophomore	D	6' 0" (1.83 m)	195 lb (88 kg)	1999-08-11	Lakeville, Minnesota	Langley Rivermen (BCHL)	—
5	(United States)	Cam Babiak	Sophomore	D	6' 0" (1.83 m)	190 lb (86 kg)	1999-04-30	Saline, Michigan	Brookings Blizzard (NAHL)	—
6	(United States)	Alex Barber (A)	Junior	F	5' 10" (1.78 m)	150 lb (68 kg)	1999-02-17	Dublin, Ohio	Central Illinois Flying Aces (USHL)	—
7	(Canada)	T. J. Lloyd	Sophomore	D	5' 9" (1.75 m)	172 lb (78 kg)	1999-11-15	Lloydminster, Saskatchewan	Spruce Grove Saints (AJHL)	—
8	(Canada)	Chrystopher Collin	Freshman	F	5' 11" (1.8 m)	172 lb (78 kg)	1999-05-05	Montreal, Quebec	Edmundston Blizzard (MHL)	—
10	(United States)	Max Johnson	Senior	F	5' 10" (1.78 m)	192 lb (87 kg)	1998-05-12	Lakeville, Minnesota	Sioux Falls Stampede (USHL)	—
11	(United States)	Taylor Schneider	Junior	F	6' 1" (1.85 m)	161 lb (73 kg)	1998-02-18	Lakeville, Minnesota	Dubuque Fighting Saints (USHL)	—
12	(Canada)	Gavin Gould	Senior	F	5' 8" (1.73 m)	155 lb (70 kg)	1996-04-27	North Vancouver, British Columbia	Michigan Tech (WCHA)	—
13	(United States)	Adam Conquest	Sophomore	F	6' 0" (1.83 m)	190 lb (86 kg)	2000-05-10	Brighton, Michigan	Cowichan Valley Capitals (BCHL)	—
14	(United States)	Justin Wells	Senior	D	6' 4" (1.93 m)	200 lb (91 kg)	1998-07-31	North Canton, Ohio	Sioux Falls Stampede (USHL)	—
15	(United States)	Evan Dougherty	Junior	F	6' 0" (1.83 m)	182 lb (83 kg)	1999-04-17	Kalamazoo, Michigan	Waterloo Black Hawks (USHL)	—
16	(Canada)	Cameron Wright	Senior	F	6' 1" (1.85 m)	189 lb (86 kg)	1998-08-11	Newmarket, Ontario	St. Michael's Buzzers (OJHL)	—
17	(Canada)	Ethan Scardina	Freshman	F	6' 1" (1.85 m)	192 lb (87 kg)	2000-11-02	South Surrey, British Columbia	Nanaimo Clippers (BCHL)	—
18	(United States)	Trevor St-Jean	Junior	F	5' 8" (1.73 m)	173 lb (78 kg)	1997-10-10	Findlay, Ohio	Langley Rivermen (BCHL)	—
20	(United States)	Connor Ford (C)	Senior	F	6' 0" (1.83 m)	187 lb (85 kg)	1998-02-05	Pittsburgh, Pennsylvania	Sioux City Musketeers (USHL)	—
21	(Canada)	Seth Fyten	Freshman	F	6' 2" (1.88 m)	187 lb (85 kg)	2000-11-23	Didsbury, Alberta	Spruce Grove Saints (AJHL)	—
22	(United States)	Adam Pitters	Sophomore	F	5' 11" (1.8 m)	180 lb (82 kg)	1999-02-09	Grosse Pointe, Michigan	Aberdeen Wings (NAHL)	—
23	(Canada)	Max Coyle	Sophomore	D	6' 1" (1.85 m)	195 lb (88 kg)	1998-01-29	Tillsonburg, Ontario	Alabama Huntsville (WCHA)	—
25	(United States)	Sam Craggs	Senior	F	6' 1" (1.85 m)	200 lb (91 kg)	1997-05-30	Elmhurst, Illinois	Waterloo Black Hawks (USHL)	—
27	(Canada)	Tim Theocharidis	Junior	D	6' 1" (1.85 m)	183 lb (83 kg)	1998-06-28	Scarborough, Ontario	Carleton Place Canadians (CCHL)	—
28	(United States)	Brandon Kruse (A)	Senior	F	5' 9" (1.75 m)	155 lb (70 kg)	1999-02-26	Saline, Michigan	Brookings Blizzard (NAHL)	VGK, 135th overall 2018
29	(United States)	Chase Danol	Sophomore	F	6' 1" (1.85 m)	195 lb (88 kg)	1999-01-20	Westland, Michigan	Coquitlam Express (BCHL)	—
31	(United States)	Eric Dop	Senior	G	5' 10" (1.78 m)	159 lb (72 kg)	1998-08-23	Lewis Center, Ohio	Tri-City Storm (USHL)	—
32	(United States)	Brett Rich	Senior	G	6' 3" (1.91 m)	183 lb (83 kg)	1999-01-09	Bowling Green, Ohio	Bowling Green High School (USHS–OH)	—
33	(Sweden)	Anton Malmström	Freshman	D	6' 4" (1.93 m)	203 lb (92 kg)	2000-03-18	Österhaninge, Sweden	Djurgården J20 (J20 SuperElit)	—
40	(Canada)	Zack Rose	Sophomore	G	6' 1" (1.85 m)	185 lb (84 kg)	1999-07-03	Paradise, Newfoundland	Victoria Grizzlies (BCHL)	—

== Standings ==
2020–21 Western Collegiate Hockey Association Standings
	Conference record										Overall record					
	GP	W	L	T	OTW	OTL	3/SW	PTS	GF	GA	GP	W	L	T	GF	GA
#4 Minnesota State †	14	13	1	0	1	1	0	39	56	15	27	22	5	1	100	46
#14 Lake Superior State *	14	9	5	0	2	2	0	27	39	34	29	19	7	3	86	63
#18 Bowling Green	14	8	5	1	0	2	0	27	46	34	31	20	10	1	108	67
#10 Bemidji State	14	8	5	1	3	2	0	24	42	34	29	16	10	3	82	70
Michigan Tech	14	7	7	0	1	0	0	20	38	35	30	17	12	1	78	63
Northern Michigan	14	6	7	1	2	2	1	20	40	47	29	11	17	1	79	103
Alabama–Huntsville	14	3	11	0	1	0	0	8	18	49	22	3	18	1	31	80
Ferris State	14	0	13	1	0	1	1	3	28	59	25	1	23	1	55	103
Alaska	0	-	-	-	-	-	-	-	-	-	0	-	-	-	-	-
Alaska Anchorage	0	-	-	-	-	-	-	-	-	-	0	-	-	-	-	-
Championship: March 20, 2021 † indicates conference regular season champion * indicates conference tournament champion Rankings: USCHO.com Top 20 Poll

== Schedule and results ==
Date	Time	Opponent^{#}	Rank^{#}	Site	TV	Decision	Result	Attendance	Record
Regular season
November 13	7:07 PM	vs. Adrian*		Slater Family Ice Arena • Bowling Green, Ohio		Dop	W 6–2	300	1–0–0
November 21	7:05 PM	vs. Adrian*	#19	Slater Family Ice Arena • Bowling Green, Ohio		Rose	W 5–0	0	2–0–0
December 1	7:00 PM	at Robert Morris*	#18	Clearview Arena • Neville Township, Pennsylvania		Dop	W 6–3	0	3–0–0
December 5	1:30 PM	vs. Mercyhurst*	#18	Slater Family Ice Arena • Bowling Green, Ohio		Rose	L 1–2	300	3–1–0
December 6	3:00 PM	at Mercyhurst*	#18	Mercyhurst Ice Center • Erie, Pennsylvania		Dop	W 3–1	149	4–1–0
December 11	7:07 PM	vs. Ferris State*	#16	Slater Family Ice Arena • Bowling Green, Ohio		Rose	W 3–2	300	5–1–0
December 12	7:07 PM	at Ferris State*	#16	Ewigleben Arena • Big Rapids, Michigan		Dop	W 6–2	0	6–1–0
December 18	7:00 PM	at #11 Quinnipiac*	#13	People's United Center • Hamden, Connecticut		Rose	W 4–1	0	7–1–0
December 19	7:00 PM	at #11 Quinnipiac*	#13	People's United Center • Hamden, Connecticut		Dop	W 4–2	0	8–1–0
December 29	3:07 PM	vs. Robert Morris*	#7	Slater Family Ice Arena • Bowling Green, Ohio		Rose	W 2–1	300	9–1–0
January 2	3:07 PM	at Ferris State	#7	Ewigleben Arena • Big Rapids, Michigan	FloHockey.tv	Dop	W 6–1	250	10–1–0 (1–0–0)
January 3	3:07 PM	at Ferris State	#7	Ewigleben Arena • Big Rapids, Michigan	FloHockey.tv	Rose	W 4–2	250	11–1–0 (2–0–0)
January 7	7:07 PM	vs. Bemidji State	#7	Slater Family Ice Arena • Bowling Green, Ohio	FloHockey.tv	Dop	W 3–2	300	12–1–0 (3–0–0)
January 8	7:07 PM	vs. Bemidji State	#7	Slater Family Ice Arena • Bowling Green, Ohio	FloHockey.tv	Dop	L 3–4 ^{OT}	300	12–2–0 (3–1–0)
January 11	7:00 PM	at USNTDP*	#7	USA Hockey Arena • Plymouth, Michigan (Exhibition)		Rich	L 1–5	250	
January 15	7:07 PM	vs. Northern Michigan*	#8	Slater Family Ice Arena • Bowling Green, Ohio		Dop	W 5–1	300	13–2–0
January 16	7:07 PM	vs. Northern Michigan*	#8	Slater Family Ice Arena • Bowling Green, Ohio		Rose	W 6–2	300	14–2–0
January 21	6:07 PM	at Bemidji State*	#5	Sanford Center • Bemidji, Minnesota		Dop	L 1–2	0	14–3–0
January 22	3:07 PM	at Bemidji State*	#5	Sanford Center • Bemidji, Minnesota		Dop	L 1–3	0	14–4–0
January 29	7:07 PM	vs. #18 Michigan Tech	#8	Slater Family Ice Arena • Bowling Green, Ohio	FloHockey.tv	Dop	W 6–3	300	15–4–0 (4–1–0)
January 30	7:07 PM	vs. #18 Michigan Tech	#8	Slater Family Ice Arena • Bowling Green, Ohio	FloHockey.tv	Rose	W 5–2	300	16–4–0 (5–1–0)
February 5	8:07 PM	at #6 Minnesota State	#8	Mayo Clinic Health System Event Center • Mankato, Minnesota	FloHockey.tv	Dop	L 0–4	150	16–5–0 (5–2–0)
February 6	7:07 PM	at #6 Minnesota State	#8	Mayo Clinic Health System Event Center • Mankato, Minnesota	FloHockey.tv	Rose	L 1–5	150	16–6–0 (5–3–0)
February 12	7:07 PM	vs. Lake Superior State	#12	Slater Family Ice Arena • Bowling Green, Ohio	FloHockey.tv	Dop	L 1–2 ^{OT}	300	16–7–0 (5–4–0)
February 13	7:07 PM	vs. Lake Superior State	#12	Slater Family Ice Arena • Bowling Green, Ohio	FloHockey.tv	Dop	L 2–5	300	16–8–0 (5–5–0)
February 20	6:07 PM	at Northern Michigan	#14	Berry Events Center • Marquette, Michigan	FloHockey.tv	Dop	T 0–0 ^{SOL}	250	16–8–1 (5–5–1)
February 21	4:07 PM	at Northern Michigan	#14	Berry Events Center • Marquette, Michigan	FloHockey.tv	Dop	W 6–2	250	17–8–1 (6–5–1)
February 24	7:07 PM	vs. Alabama–Huntsville	#13	Slater Family Ice Arena • Bowling Green, Ohio	FloHockey.tv	Dop	W 5–0	300	18–8–1 (7–5–1)
February 28	4:07 PM	at Alabama–Huntsville	#13	Von Braun Center • Huntsville, Alabama	FloHockey.tv	Dop	W 4–2	1,313	19–8–1 (8–5–1)
WCHA Tournament
March 12	7:07 PM	vs. Northern Michigan*	#13	Slater Family Ice Arena • Bowling Green, Ohio (WCHA Quarterfinals Game 1)		Dop	L 3–4	630	19–9–1
March 13	7:07 PM	vs. Northern Michigan*	#13	Slater Family Ice Arena • Bowling Green, Ohio (WCHA Quarterfinals Game 2)		Dop	W 5–0	630	20–9–1
March 14	5:07 PM	vs. Northern Michigan*	#13	Slater Family Ice Arena • Bowling Green, Ohio (WCHA Quarterfinals Game 3)		Dop	L 1–5	630	20–10–1
Bowling Green Lost Series 1–2
*Non-conference game. ^{#}Rankings from USCHO.com Poll. All times are in Eastern Time.

== Scoring statistics ==
Name	Position	Games	Goals	Assists	Points	PIM
Brandon Kruse	LW	31	11	23	34	26
Cameron Wright	LW	31	13	16	29	32
Connor Ford	RW	31	16	12	28	10
Will Cullen	D	28	6	19	25	54
Max Johnson	C	27	10	14	24	8
Alex Barber	F	31	9	14	23	35
Taylor Schneider	LW	31	10	9	19	8
Tim Theocharidis	D	31	5	10	15	8
T. J. Lloyd	D	31	0	14	14	26
Gavin Gould	F	21	3	10	13	6
Sam Craggs	LW	27	4	8	12	55
Evan Dougherty	RW	31	8	3	11	20
Carson Musser	D	31	1	9	10	8
Justin Wells	D	31	2	7	9	18
Seth Fyten	F	28	5	1	6	6
Ethan Scardina	F	24	1	4	5	8
Christopher Collin	C/LW	21	1	3	4	2
Garrett Daly	D	29	1	3	4	6
Anton Malmström	D	20	1	2	3	17
Chase Danol	F	3	1	0	1	0
Adam Pitters	F	11	0	1	1	20
Adam Conquest	RW	14	0	1	1	4
Eric Dop	G	23	0	1	1	0
Max Coyle	D	23	0	1	1	8
Brett Rich	G	1	0	0	0	0
Trevor St. Jean	F	1	0	0	0	0
Cam Babiak	D	2	0	0	0	2
Zack Rose	G	10	0	0	0	0
Bench	-	-	-	-	-	6
Total			108	185	293	393

== Goaltending statistics ==
Name	Games	Minutes	Wins	Losses	Ties	Goals against	Saves	Shut outs	SV %	GAA
Brett Rich	1	1:59	0	0	0	0	0	0	-	0.00
Zack Rose	10	545	7	2	0	18	178	1	.908	1.98
Eric Dop	23	1306	13	8	1	47	566	2	.923	2.16
Empty Net	-	11	-	-	-	2	-	-	-	-
Total	31	1865	20	10	1	67	744	4^{†}	.917	2.15

† Dop and Rich shared a shutout on February 24

== Rankings ==
Poll	Week																					
Poll	Pre	1	2	3	4	5	6	7	8	9	10	11	12	13	14	15	16	17	18	19	20	21 (Final)
USCHO.com	NR	19	18	18	16	13	9	7	7	8	5	8	8	12	14	13	13	13	16	17	-	18
USA Today	NR	NR	NR	NR	NR	12	8	7	6	7	5	8	8	12	13	14	13	13	NR	NR	NR	NR

USCHO did not release a poll in week 20.

== Awards and honors ==
Player	Award	Ref
Will Cullen	WCHA Defensive Player of the Year	
Will Cullen	WCHA First Team	
Brandon Kruse	WCHA First Team	
Connor Ford	WCHA First Team	
