= Damon Whitten =

American ice hockey player and coach

Current position
- Title: Head coach
- Team: Lake Superior State
- Conference: CCHA

Biographical details
- Born: April 5, 1977 (age 49); Brighton, Michigan, U.S.
- Education: Michigan State University

Playing career
- 1995–1996: Detroit Freeze (NAHL)
- 1996–1997: St. Michael's Buzzers (OPJHL)
- 1997–2001: Michigan State
- 2001–2002: Greenville Grrrowl (ECHL)
- 2002–2003: Arkansas RiverBlades (ECHL)
- 2003–2004: Lansing Ice Nuts (IIHL)
- Position: Left wing

Coaching career (HC unless noted)
- 2004–2005: Michigan State (asst.)
- 2005–2006: Wayne State (asst.)
- 2006–2008: Alaska Anchorage (asst.)
- 2008–2010: Michigan State (Dir. of Hockey Ops.)
- 2010–2014: Michigan Tech (asst.)
- 2014–present: Lake Superior State

Head coaching record
- Overall: 166–240–36 (.416)
- Tournaments: 0–1 (.000)

Accomplishments and honors

Championships
- 2021 WCHA Tournament champion

Damon Whitten (born April 5, 1977) is an American ice hockey coach and former player. He is currently the men's hockey head coach of the Lake Superior State Lakers.

== Playing career ==
Whitten played junior hockey for the Detroit Freeze of the North American Hockey League in 1995–96 before moving to the St. Michael's Buzzers in the Ontario Provincial Junior A Hockey League the following season. Beginning in the 1997–98 season, Whitten played four years for the Michigan State Spartans, and was named alternate captain in his senior season. After college, he turned pro, playing two seasons in the ECHL: in 2001–02 for the Greenville Grrrowl (winning the league championship Kelly Cup) and 2002–03 for the Arkansas RiverBlades.

== Coaching career ==
Whitten returned to Michigan State in 2004–05 to serve as an assistant coach under head coach Rick Comley. He then spent one season as an assistant at Wayne State before moving to Alaska Anchorage for two seasons. In 2006, he returned to his alma mater where he was named Director of Hockey Operations. Whitten returned to the bench in 2010, when he was an assistant coach at Michigan Tech. On April 26, 2014, Whitten was named head coach at Lake Superior State.

== Head coaching record ==
Record table
Season	Team	Overall	Conference	Standing	Postseason
Lake Superior State Lakers (WCHA) (2014–2021)
2014–15	Lake Superior State	8–28–2	7–20–1	t-8th	WCHA First Round
2015–16	Lake Superior State	14–22–5	10–13–5	7th	WCHA First Round
2016–17	Lake Superior State	11–18–7	8–13–7	7th	WCHA Quarterfinals
2017–18	Lake Superior State	10–22–4	8–17–3	9th	
2018–19	Lake Superior State	23–13–2	16–10–2–0	4th	WCHA Semifinals
2019–20	Lake Superior State	14–23–4	11–13–4–4	7th	WCHA Quarterfinals
2020–21	Lake Superior State	19–7–3	9–5–0	T–2nd	NCAA Regional Semifinals
Lake Superior State:		99–133–27	69–91–22		
Lake Superior State Lakers (CCHA) (2021–present)
2021–22	Lake Superior State	18–18–1	13–13–0	4th	CCHA Quarterfinals
2022–23	Lake Superior State	9–25–2	8–17–1	8th	CCHA Quarterfinals
2023–24	Lake Superior State	17–20–1	11–12–1	7th	CCHA Semifinals
2024–25	Lake Superior State	12–22–2	10–15–1	8th	CCHA Quarterfinals
2025–26	Lake Superior State	11–22–3	8–16–2	7th	CCHA Quarterfinals
Lake Superior State:		67–107–9	50–73–5		
Total:		166–240–36			
National champion Postseason invitational champion Conference regular season champion Conference regular season and conference tournament champion Division regular season champion Division regular season and conference tournament champion Conference tournament champion
