= 2020–21 Bemidji State Beavers men's ice hockey season =

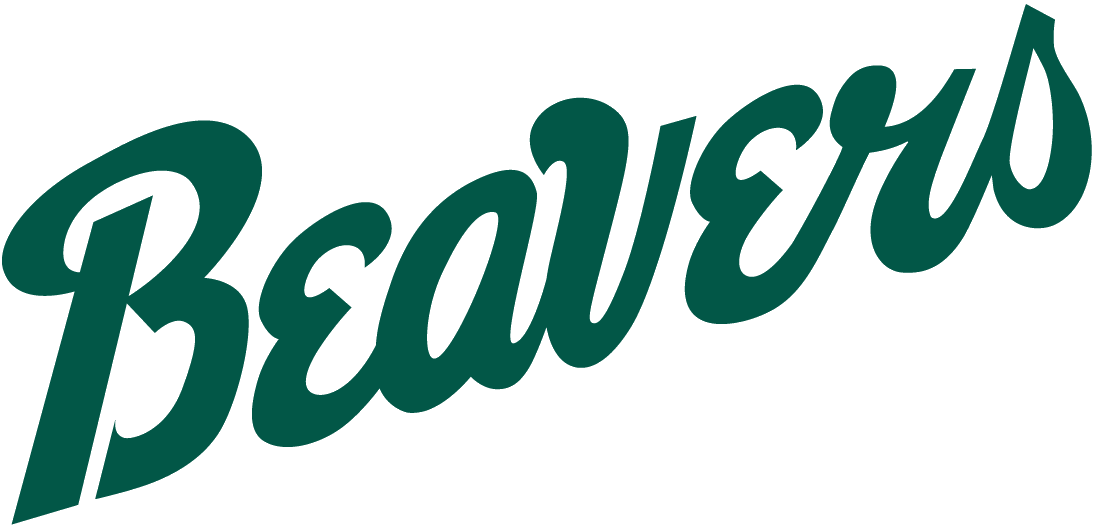

NCAA tournament, Regional final
- Conference: 4th WCHA
- Home ice: Sanford Center

Rankings
- USCHO: 10
- USA Today: 10

Record
- Overall: 16–10–3
- Conference: 8–5–1–3–2–0
- Home: 10–5–0
- Road: 5–3–3
- Neutral: 1–2–0

Coaches and captains
- Head coach: Tom Serratore
- Assistant coaches: Travis Winter; Eddie Olczyk III; Michael Fanelli
- Captain: Ethan Somoza
- Alternate captain(s): Brad Johnson; Owen Sillinger; Tyler Vold

The 2020–21 Bemidji State Beavers men's ice hockey season was the 65th season of play for the program, the 22nd at the Division I level and the 11th in the WCHA conference. The Beavers represented Bemidji State University and were coached by Tom Serratore, in his 20th season.

== Season ==
As a result of the ongoing COVID-19 pandemic the entire college ice hockey season was delayed. Because the NCAA had previously announced that all winter sports athletes would retain whatever eligibility they possessed through at least the following year, none of Bemidji State's players would lose a season of play. However, the NCAA also approved a change in its transfer regulations that would allow players to transfer and play immediately rather than having to sit out a season, as the rules previously required.

Bemidji State's start to the season was a bit rocky but the team started playing better by the beginning of January and took 3 out of four games from a highly ranked Bowling Green squad. After flirting with a ranking of their own for a few weeks, the Beavers put a string of wins together towards the end of the regular season that placed them firmly in the top 20. The team's performance against the top teams in the WCHA made it possible that BSU would make the NCAA tournament without a conference title, but sweeping Michigan Tech in the quarterfinals all but guaranteed them a spot.

The Beavers were ranked 13th by the NCAA selection committee and were placed opposite Wisconsin for the first tournament game. The Beavers played well from the start, recording 16 shots and taking an early lead after the first period. After the Badgers cut their lead in half the game tightened up but BSU continued to fire the puck on goal and regained their two-goal lead late in the second. A gaffe by Wisconsin's netminder allowed Owen Sillinger to score the team's fourth goal and the Beavers added another early in the third. Wisconsin fought back to score twice in the final frame but the Beavers' lead was too great and an empty net goal with less than 2 seconds remaining sent Bemidji State to the regional final. The Beavers' performance in their second game was nightmarish for the team. BSU ended up recording just 18 shots all game and were unable to score on any of their six power play opportunities, which included a five-minute major. To make matters worse, Massachusetts opened the scoring with a short-handed goal and never let the Beavers onto the game, winning the match 4–0.

Austin Jouppi and Nick Leitner sat out the season.

== Departures ==
Player	Position	Nationality	Cause
Adam Brady	Forward	Canada	Graduation (Signed with Stockton Heat)
Charlie Combs	Forward	United States	Transferred to Michigan State
Hank Johnson	Goaltender	United States	Transferred to Mercyhurst
Tommy Muck	Defenseman	United States	Graduation (Signed with Kansas City Mavericks)
Hampus Sjödahl	Forward	Sweden	Graduation

== Recruiting ==
Player	Position	Nationality	Age	Notes
Gavin Enright	Goaltender	United States	21	Farmington, MN
Ethan Gauer	Defenseman	United States	20	Farmington, MN
Austin Jouppi	Forward	United States	20	Duluth, MN
Eric Martin	Forward	Canada	20	Calgary, AB
Aaron Myers	Forward	Canada	21	Thief River Falls, MN
Jack Powell	Defenseman	United States	21	Alexandria, MN
Lukas Sillinger	Forward	Canada	20	Regina, SK

== Roster ==
As of December 31, 2020

No.	Nat.	Player	Class	Pos	Height	Weight	DoB	Hometown	Previous team	NHL rights
1	(United States)	Gavin Enright	Freshman	G	6' 2" (1.88 m)	161 lb (73 kg)	1999-08-26	Farmington, MN	Green Bay Gamblers (USHL)	—
2	(United States)	Austin Jouppi	Freshman	F	5' 8" (1.73 m)	170 lb (77 kg)	2000-04-18	Duluth, MN	Bismarck Bobcats (NAHL)	—
3	(United States)	Jack Powell	Freshman	D	5' 11" (1.8 m)	181 lb (82 kg)	1999-09-11	Alexandria, MN	Aberdeen Wings (NAHL)	—
4	(United States)	Will Zmolek	Sophomore	D	6' 3" (1.91 m)	194 lb (88 kg)	1999-04-02	Rochester, MN	Cedar Rapids RoughRiders (USHL)	—
5	(United States)	Nick Leitner	Sophomore	D	6' 0" (1.83 m)	185 lb (84 kg)	1998-04-17	Bemidji, MN	Green Bay Gamblers (USHL)	—
6	(Slovakia)	Sam Solenský	Sophomore	F	5' 10" (1.78 m)	176 lb (80 kg)	1998-08-25	Michalovce, Slovakia	Johnstown Tomahawks (NAHL)	—
7	(United States)	Kyle Looft	Sophomore	D	6' 3" (1.91 m)	192 lb (87 kg)	1998-06-27	Mankato, MN	Cedar Rapids RoughRiders (USHL)	—
8	(Canada)	Darby Gula	Junior	D	5' 10" (1.78 m)	180 lb (82 kg)	1998-01-08	Steinbach, MB	Steinbach Pistons (MJHL)	—
9	(United States)	Ethan Somoza (C)	Senior	F	5' 11" (1.8 m)	189 lb (86 kg)	1996-05-17	Simi Valley, CA	Bloomington Thunder (USHL)	—
11	(Canada)	Eric Martin	Freshman	F	5' 10" (1.78 m)	154 lb (70 kg)	2000-06-05	Calgary, AB	Drumheller Dragons (AJHL)	—
12	(Canada)	Owen Sillinger (A)	Junior	F	5' 10" (1.78 m)	182 lb (83 kg)	1997-09-23	Regina, SK	Penticton Vees (BCHL)	—
13	(United States)	Carter Jones	Sophomore	F	5' 9" (1.75 m)	165 lb (75 kg)	1999-05-15	Hillyard, WA	Trail Smoke Eaters (BCHL)	—
14	(Canada)	Alex Ierullo	Junior	F	5' 9" (1.75 m)	172 lb (78 kg)	1997-07-30	Woodbridge, ON	Newmarket Hurricanes (OJHL)	—
15	(Canada)	Tyler Jubenvill	Junior	D	5' 11" (1.8 m)	193 lb (88 kg)	1999-11-30	Gilbert Plains, MB	Cedar Rapids RoughRiders (USHL)	—
16	(United States)	Aaron Miller	Senior	F	5' 9" (1.75 m)	172 lb (78 kg)	1995-12-20	Superior, WI	Minnesota Wilderness (NAHL)	—
17	(Canada)	Ross Armour	Junior	F	6' 2" (1.88 m)	174 lb (79 kg)	1998-02-07	Trail, BC	Trail Smoke Eaters (BCHL)	—
18	(United States)	Brad Johnson (A)	Senior	D	5' 9" (1.75 m)	186 lb (84 kg)	1996-01-23	Chesterfield, MO	Fargo Force (USHL)	—
19	(Canada)	Brad Belisle	Sophomore	F	6' 2" (1.88 m)	194 lb (88 kg)	1998-01-26	Thunder Bay, ON	Aberdeen Wings (NAHL)	—
20	(Canada)	Lukas Sillinger	Freshman	F	5' 11" (1.8 m)	170 lb (77 kg)	2000-09-14	Regina, SK	Penticton Vees (BCHL)	—
21	(United States)	Brendan Harris	Senior	F	5' 7" (1.7 m)	161 lb (73 kg)	1996-07-10	Henderson, NV	Wenatchee Wild (BCHL)	—
22	(United States)	Tyler Vold (A)	Senior	D	5' 10" (1.78 m)	183 lb (83 kg)	1996-09-01	Andover, MN	Minnesota Wilderness (NAHL)	—
23	(United States)	Aaron Myers	Freshman	F	5' 11" (1.8 m)	176 lb (80 kg)	1999-09-28	Thief River Falls, MN	Minnesota Wilderness (NAHL)	—
25	(United States)	Alex Adams	Junior	F	6' 1" (1.85 m)	191 lb (87 kg)	1997-12-30	Grand Rapids, MN	Minot Minotauros (NAHL)	—
26	(United States)	Nick Cardelli	Junior	F	5' 10" (1.78 m)	171 lb (78 kg)	1997-06-06	Wood Dale, IL	Youngstown Phantoms (USHL)	—
27	(Canada)	Tyler Kirkup	Junior	F	6' 0" (1.83 m)	203 lb (92 kg)	1998-04-03	Virden, MB	Virden Oil Capitals (MJHL)	—
28	(Sweden)	Elias Rosén	Sophomore	D	5' 10" (1.78 m)	176 lb (80 kg)	1999-01-04	Mora, Sweden	Tri-City Storm (USHL)	—
29	(United States)	Ethan Grauer	Freshman	D	6' 0" (1.83 m)	185 lb (84 kg)	1999-12-23	Farmington, MN	Bismarck Bobcats (NAHL)	—
33	(United States)	Zach Driscoll	Senior	G	6' 0" (1.83 m)	172 lb (78 kg)	1997-02-25	Apple Valley, MN	Omaha Lancers (USHL)	—
35	(United States)	Mike Carr	Freshman (RS)	G	6' 0" (1.83 m)	179 lb (81 kg)	1998-06-08	Columbus, OH	Cornwall Colts (CCHL)	—

== Standings ==
2020–21 Western Collegiate Hockey Association Standings
	Conference record										Overall record					
	GP	W	L	T	OTW	OTL	3/SW	PTS	GF	GA	GP	W	L	T	GF	GA
#4 Minnesota State †	14	13	1	0	1	1	0	39	56	15	27	22	5	1	100	46
#14 Lake Superior State *	14	9	5	0	2	2	0	27	39	34	29	19	7	3	86	63
#18 Bowling Green	14	8	5	1	0	2	0	27	46	34	31	20	10	1	108	67
#10 Bemidji State	14	8	5	1	3	2	0	24	42	34	29	16	10	3	82	70
Michigan Tech	14	7	7	0	1	0	0	20	38	35	30	17	12	1	78	63
Northern Michigan	14	6	7	1	2	2	1	20	40	47	29	11	17	1	79	103
Alabama–Huntsville	14	3	11	0	1	0	0	8	18	49	22	3	18	1	31	80
Ferris State	14	0	13	1	0	1	1	3	28	59	25	1	23	1	55	103
Alaska	0	-	-	-	-	-	-	-	-	-	0	-	-	-	-	-
Alaska Anchorage	0	-	-	-	-	-	-	-	-	-	0	-	-	-	-	-
Championship: March 20, 2021 † indicates conference regular season champion * indicates conference tournament champion Rankings: USCHO.com Top 20 Poll

== Schedule and results ==
Date	Time	Opponent^{#}	Rank^{#}	Site	TV	Decision	Result	Attendance	Record
Regular season
November 22	5:07 PM	vs. #5 Minnesota State*	#16	Sanford Center • Bemidji, MN		Driscoll	L 0–5	105	0–1–0
December 12	4:07 PM	vs. Michigan Tech*		Sanford Center • Bemidji, MN		Driscoll	W 6–3	105	1–1–0
December 13	2:07 PM	vs. Michigan Tech*		Sanford Center • Bemidji, MN		Driscoll	W 0–3	105	1–2–0
December 18	7:37 PM	at #5 Minnesota State*		Mayo Clinic Health System Event Center • Mankato, MN		Driscoll	L 4–5	0	1–3–0
December 19	5:07 PM	at #5 Minnesota State*		Mayo Clinic Health System Event Center • Mankato, MN		Driscoll	T 1–1 ^{SOL}	0	1–3–1
January 2	4:00 PM	at #19 Lake Superior State*		Taffy Abel Arena • Sault Ste. Marie, MI		Driscoll	W 4–1	0	2–3–1
January 3	2:00 PM	at #19 Lake Superior State*		Taffy Abel Arena • Sault Ste. Marie, MI		Driscoll	W 2–2 ^{SOL}	0	2–3–2
January 7	2:00 PM	at #7 Bowling Green		Slater Family Ice Arena • Bowling Green, OH	FloHockey.tv	Driscoll	L 2–3	300	2–4–2 (0–1–0)
January 8	6:07 PM	at #7 Bowling Green		Slater Family Ice Arena • Bowling Green, OH	FloHockey.tv	Driscoll	W 4–3 ^{OT}	300	3–4–2 (1–1–0)
January 21	5:07 PM	vs. #5 Bowling Green*		Sanford Center • Bemidji, MN		Driscoll	W 2–1	0	4–4–2
January 22	2:07 PM	vs. #5 Bowling Green*		Sanford Center • Bemidji, MN		Driscoll	W 3–1	0	5–4–2
January 29	4:07 PM	vs. #3 Minnesota State*		Sanford Center • Bemidji, MN		Driscoll	W 4–1	25	6–4–2
February 5	6:07 PM	at Ferris State	#18	Ewigleben Arena • Big Rapids, MI	FloHockey.tv	Driscoll	T 3–3 ^{SOL}	200	6–4–3 (1–1–1)
February 6	6:14 PM	at Ferris State	#18	Ewigleben Arena • Big Rapids, MI	FloHockey.tv	Carr	W 7–2	234	7–4–3 (2–1–1)
February 12	7:07 PM	vs. Northern Michigan	#17	Sanford Center • Bemidji, MN	FloHockey.tv	Driscoll	L 1–5	90	7–5–3 (2–2–1)
February 13	6:00 PM	vs. Northern Michigan	#17	Sanford Center • Bemidji, MN	FloHockey.tv	Driscoll	L 2–3 ^{OT}	90	7–6–3 (2–3–1)
February 19	6:07 PM	at #18 Michigan Tech		MacInnes Student Ice Arena • Houghton, MI	FloHockey.tv	Driscoll	W 4–1	300	8–6–3 (3–3–1)
February 20	5:07 PM	at #18 Michigan Tech		MacInnes Student Ice Arena • Houghton, MI	FloHockey.tv	Driscoll	W 2–1	300	9–6–3 (4–3–1)
February 25	7:07 PM	at #3 Minnesota State	#19	Mayo Clinic Health System Event Center • Mankato, MN	FloHockey.tv	Driscoll	L 3–4 ^{OT}	250	9–7–3 (4–4–1)
February 27	6:07 PM	vs. #3 Minnesota State	#19	Sanford Center • Bemidji, MN	FloHockey.tv	Driscoll	W 4–3 ^{OT}	150	10–7–3 (5–4–1)
March 2	6:07 PM	vs. #20 Lake Superior State	#17	Sanford Center • Bemidji, MN	FloHockey.tv	Driscoll	W 2–1 ^{OT}	250	11–7–3 (6–4–1)
March 3	4:07 PM	vs. #20 Lake Superior State	#17	Sanford Center • Bemidji, MN	FloHockey.tv	Driscoll	L 2–5	250	11–8–3 (6–5–1)
March 6	4:07 PM	vs. Alabama–Huntsville	#17	Sanford Center • Bemidji, MN	FloHockey.tv	Driscoll	W 2–0	250	12–8–3 (7–5–1)
March 7	2:07 PM	vs. Alabama–Huntsville	#17	Sanford Center • Bemidji, MN	FloHockey.tv	Driscoll	W 4–0	250	13–8–3 (8–5–1)
WCHA tournament
March 12	7:07 PM	vs. Michigan Tech*	#15	Sanford Center • Bemidji, MN (WCHA quarterfinals game 1)		Driscoll	W 3–1	250	14–8–3
March 13	6:07 PM	vs. Michigan Tech*	#15	Sanford Center • Bemidji, MN (WCHA quarterfinals game 2)		Driscoll	W 4–1	250	15–8–3
Bemidji State won series 2–0
March 19	7:37 PM	vs. #17 Lake Superior State*	#13	Mayo Clinic Health System Event Center • Mankato, MN (WCHA semifinals)		Driscoll	L 1–4	250	15–9–3
NCAA tournament
March 26	12:00 PM	vs. #4 Wisconsin*	#14	Webster Bank Arena • Bridgeport, CT (NCAA East Regional semifinals)	ESPN2	Driscoll	W 6–3	0	16–9–3
March 27	3:00 PM	vs. #6 Massachusetts*	#14	Webster Bank Arena • Bridgeport, CT (NCAA East Regional final)	ESPNU	Driscoll	L 0–4	0	16–10–3
*Non-conference game. ^{#}Rankings from USCHO.com Poll. All times are in Central Time.

== Scoring statistics ==
Name	Position	Games	Goals	Assists	Points	PIM
Alex Ierullo	LW	29	7	17	24	18
Brendan Harris	C	29	9	14	23	17
Ethan Somoza	LW	29	15	5	20	14
Elias Rosén	D	25	5	11	16	10
Owen Sillinger	C	20	10	5	15	14
Lukas Sillinger	F	28	6	9	15	46
Aaron Miller	F	27	6	8	14	10
Ross Armour	F	29	5	5	10	6
Brad Johnson	D	29	3	7	10	20
Tyler Kirkup	C/LW	29	3	7	10	14
Tyler Vold	D	29	1	9	10	2
Eric Martin	F	27	2	5	7	10
Alex Adams	F	26	2	3	5	12
Kyle Looft	D	29	1	4	5	10
Nick Cardelli	RW	7	2	2	4	0
Tyler Jubenvill	D	29	0	4	4	6
Brad Belisle	C	9	2	1	3	2
Darby Gula	D	28	1	2	3	2
Will Zmolek	D	15	0	3	3	2
Sam Solenský	C/RW	28	1	1	2	4
Aaron Myers	F	12	1	0	1	0
Carter Jones	F	23	0	1	1	0
Gavin Enright	G	1	0	0	0	0
Mike Carr	G	2	0	0	0	0
Ethan Gauer	D	4	0	0	0	0
Jack Powell	D	11	0	0	0	0
Zach Driscoll	G	28	0	0	0	2
Bench	-	-	-	-	-	8
Total			82	123	205	229

== Goaltending statistics ==
Name	Games	Minutes	Wins	Losses	Ties	Goals against	Saves	Shut-outs	SV %	GAA
Gavin Enright	1	5:10	0	0	0	0	3	0	1.000	0.00
Zach Driscoll	28	1678	15	10	3	65	767	2	.922	2.32
Mike Carr	2	70	1	0	0	3	28	0	.903	2.57
Empty Net	-	12	-	-	-	2	-	-	-	-
Total	29	1766	16	10	3	70	798	2	.919	2.38

== Rankings ==
Poll	Week																					
Poll	Pre	1	2	3	4	5	6	7	8	9	10	11	12	13	14	15	16	17	18	19	20	21 (Final)
USCHO.com	16	16	19	19	NR	NR	NR	NR	NR	NR	NR	NR	18	17	NR	19	17	15	13	14	-	10
USA Today	15	NR	NR	NR	NR	NR	NR	NR	NR	NR	NR	NR	NR	NR	NR	NR	NR	NR	12	15	10	10

USCHO did not release a poll in week 20.

== Awards and honors ==
Player	Award	Ref
Elias Rosén	WCHA Defensive Player of the Year	
Zach Driscoll	WCHA Outstanding Student-Athlete of the Year	
Elias Rosén	WCHA First Team	
Zach Driscoll	WCHA Third Team	
Lukas Sillinger	WCHA Rookie Team	
