= 2020–21 Alaska Nanooks men's ice hockey season =

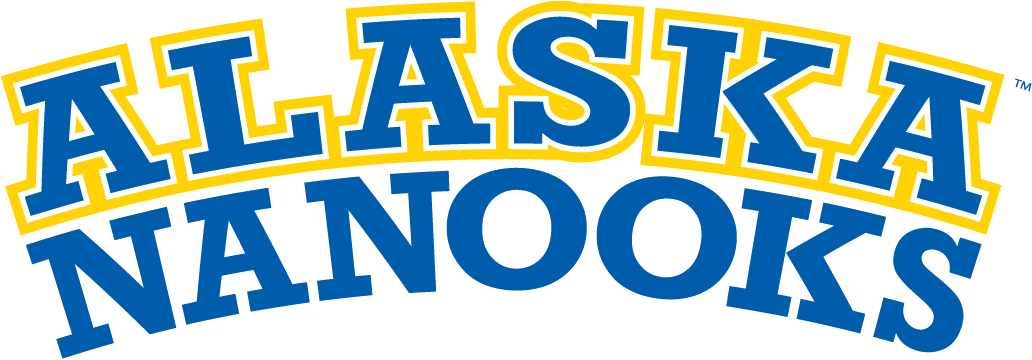
- Conference: WCHA
- Home ice: Carlson Center

Rankings
- USCHO: NR
- USA Today: NR

Record

Coaches and captains
- Head coach: Erik Largen
- Assistant coaches: Joe Howe; Lenny Hoffman; Josh Erickson; Eric Yancey

The 2020–21 Alaska Nanooks men's ice hockey season would have been the 72nd season of play for the program, the 37th at the Division I level and the 8th in the WCHA conference. The Nanooks represented the University of Alaska Fairbanks.

== Season ==
Due to health concerns as a result of the ongoing COVID-19 pandemic, Alaska notified the WCHA on December 11, shortly before it was scheduled to begin its season, that the university had decided to suspend its program for the season. The NCAA had previously announced that all winter sports athletes would retain whatever eligibility they possessed through at least the following year. Less than a week after Alaska's announcement, the NCAA approved a change in its transfer regulations that would allow players to transfer and play immediately rather than having to sit out a season, as the rules previously required. Because of this, players who would have been members of Alaska for the 2021 season had a pathway to leave the program and immediately play for another university.

== Departures ==
Player	Position	Nationality	Cause
Brennan Blaszczak	Forward	United States	Signed Professional Contract (Pensacola Ice Flyers)
Tyler Cline	Forward	United States	Graduation
Logan Coomes	Forward	United States	Graduation (signed with Marseille)
James LaDouce	Defenseman	United States	Graduation
Emil Gransøe	Goaltender	Denmark	Retired
Kylar Hope	Forward	Canada	Graduation
Steven Jandric	Forward	Canada	Transfer (Denver)
Colton Leiter	Forward/Defenseman	Canada	Graduation (signed with Visby/Roma HK)
Kyle Marino	Forward	Canada	Graduation
Anton Martinsson	Goaltender	Sweden	Graduate Transfer (Providence)
Max Newton	Forward	Canada	Transfer (Merrimack)
Tristan Thompson	Defenseman	Canada	Graduation (signed with Marseille)
Troy Van Tetering	Forward	Canada	Graduation
Jack Weiss	Defenseman	United States	Graduation
Justin Young	Forward	Canada	Transfer (American International)

== Recruiting ==
Player	Position	Nationality	Age	Notes
Daniel Allin^{†}	Goaltender	Canada	20	Edmonton, AB
Roberts Bļugers	Forward	Latvia	22	Riga, LAT; transfer from Lake Superior State
Jakob Breault	Forward	Canada	20	Acton Vale, PQ
Antonio Di Paolo	Defenseman	Canada	21	La Ronge, SK
Harrison Israels	Forward	Canada	21	Mississauga, ON
Matt Koethe	Forward	United States	21	Minnetonka, MN
Riley Murphy	Forward	United States	20	Rockford, MI
Brayden Nicholetts	Forward	Canada	21	Spruce Grove, AB
Brady Risk	Forward	Canada	21	Spruce Grove, AB
Anton Rubtsov	Forward	Russia	21	St. Petersburg, RUS
Austin Ryman^{†}	Forward	United States	19	Fairbanks, AK

† played junior hockey or equivalent during 2020–21 season.

== Roster ==
As of January 31, 2021.

No.	Nat.	Player	Class	Pos	Height	Weight	DoB	Hometown	Previous team	NHL rights
1	(Canada)	Daniel Allin	Freshman	G	6' 2" (1.88 m)	185 lb (84 kg)	2000-02-11	Edmonton, Alberta	Drumheller (AJHL)	—
4	(Latvia)	Kristaps Jākobsons	Sophomore	D	6' 0" (1.83 m)	202 lb (92 kg)	1996-12-25	Tukums, Latvia	Zemgale (LHL)	—
5	(Latvia)	Markuss Komuls	Sophomore	D	5' 10" (1.78 m)	187 lb (85 kg)	1998-01-04	Talsi, Latvia	Kenai River (NAHL)	—
6	(Sweden)	Didrik Henbrandt	Sophomore	F	5' 10" (1.78 m)	169 lb (77 kg)	1998-04-10	Linköping, Sweden	Minot (NAHL)	—
7	(Canada)	Garrett Pyke	Sophomore	D	6' 1" (1.85 m)	190 lb (86 kg)	1999-08-01	Toronto, Ontario	Oakville (OJHL)	—
8	(United States)	Jordan Muzzillo	Junior	D	6' 0" (1.83 m)	185 lb (84 kg)	1997-03-24	Capron, Illinois	Springfield (NAHL)	—
10	(Latvia)	Ēriks Žohovs	Sophomore	F	6' 0" (1.83 m)	196 lb (89 kg)	1997-11-26	Riga, Latvia	Zemgale (LHL)	—
11	(Canada)	Brady Risk	Freshman	F	5' 9" (1.75 m)	175 lb (79 kg)	1999-03-16	Medicine Hat, Alberta	Drumheller (AJHL)	—
12	(United States)	Caleb Hite	Junior	F	5' 11" (1.8 m)	185 lb (84 kg)	1997-02-11	Grand Blanc, Michigan	Fairbanks (NAHL)	—
13	(Sweden)	Filip Fornåå Svensson	Sophomore	F	6' 4" (1.93 m)	205 lb (93 kg)	1999-01-05	Linköping, Sweden	Linköpings J20 (J20 SuperElit)	—
14	(Russia)	Anton Rubtsov	Freshman	F	5' 10" (1.78 m)	165 lb (75 kg)	1999-03-06	Saint Petersburg, Russia	Shreveport (NAHL)	—
15	(Canada)	Antonio DiPaolo	Freshman	F	5' 11" (1.8 m)	190 lb (86 kg)	1999-01-14	Saskatoon, Saskatchewan	Aberdeen (NAHL)	—
16	(Canada)	Chase Dubois	Sophomore	F	5' 9" (1.75 m)	160 lb (73 kg)	1998-03-12	Williams Lake, British Columbia	West Kelowna (BCHL)	—
17	(Canada)	Colin Doyle	Junior	F	5' 10" (1.78 m)	185 lb (84 kg)	1998-05-12	Campbellford, Ontario	Wellington (OJHL)	—
18	(United States)	Riley Murphy	Freshman	F	6' 0" (1.83 m)	192 lb (87 kg)	1999-10-29	Rockford, Michigan	Aberdeen (NAHL)	—
23	(Latvia)	Roberts Kaļķis	Sophomore	D	6' 1" (1.85 m)	210 lb (95 kg)	1998-12-22	Riga, Latvia	Rīga (MHL)	—
24	(Canada)	Harrison Israels	Freshman	F	6' 1" (1.85 m)	200 lb (91 kg)	1999-09-01	Mississauga, Ontario	Oakville (OJHL)	—
25	(Finland)	Antti Virtanen	Junior	F	6' 0" (1.83 m)	185 lb (84 kg)	1998-03-14	Kittilä, Finland	Sioux Falls (USHL)	—
27	(Latvia)	Roberts Bļugers	Sophomore	F	6' 3" (1.91 m)	185 lb (84 kg)	1998-08-03	Riga, Latvia	Lake Superior State (WCHA)	—
28	(Canada)	Brayden Nicholetts	Freshman	F	5' 11" (1.8 m)	180 lb (82 kg)	1999-08-27	Spruce Grove, Alberta	Spruce Grove (AJHL)	—
29	(Canada)	Chris Jandric	Junior	D	5' 11" (1.8 m)	179 lb (81 kg)	1998-10-03	Prince George, British Columbia	Vernon (BCHL)	—
30	(Latvia)	Gustavs Dāvis Grigals	Junior	G	6' 2" (1.88 m)	189 lb (86 kg)	1998-07-22	Riga, Latvia	Shreveport (NAHL)	—
31	(United States)	Austin Ryman	Freshman	G	5' 10" (1.78 m)	185 lb (84 kg)	2000-11-20	Fairbanks, Alaska	Fairbanks Ice Dogs (NAHL)	—
37	(Canada)	Jakob Breault	Freshman	F	5' 11" (1.8 m)	180 lb (82 kg)	1999-10-04	Acton Vale, Quebec	Aberdeen (NAHL)	—
40	(United States)	Matt Koethe	Freshman	F	5' 10" (1.78 m)	185 lb (84 kg)	1999-09-28	Minnetonka, Minnesota	Fairbanks (NAHL)	—

== Standings ==
2020–21 Western Collegiate Hockey Association Standings
	Conference record										Overall record					
	GP	W	L	T	OTW	OTL	3/SW	PTS	GF	GA	GP	W	L	T	GF	GA
#4 Minnesota State †	14	13	1	0	1	1	0	39	56	15	27	22	5	1	100	46
#14 Lake Superior State *	14	9	5	0	2	2	0	27	39	34	29	19	7	3	86	63
#18 Bowling Green	14	8	5	1	0	2	0	27	46	34	31	20	10	1	108	67
#10 Bemidji State	14	8	5	1	3	2	0	24	42	34	29	16	10	3	82	70
Michigan Tech	14	7	7	0	1	0	0	20	38	35	30	17	12	1	78	63
Northern Michigan	14	6	7	1	2	2	1	20	40	47	29	11	17	1	79	103
Alabama–Huntsville	14	3	11	0	1	0	0	8	18	49	22	3	18	1	31	80
Ferris State	14	0	13	1	0	1	1	3	28	59	25	1	23	1	55	103
Alaska	0	-	-	-	-	-	-	-	-	-	0	-	-	-	-	-
Alaska Anchorage	0	-	-	-	-	-	-	-	-	-	0	-	-	-	-	-
Championship: March 20, 2021 † indicates conference regular season champion * indicates conference tournament champion Rankings: USCHO.com Top 20 Poll

== Schedule and results ==
Season Cancelled
