= 2020–21 Michigan Tech Huskies men's ice hockey season =

- Conference: T–5th WCHA
- Home ice: MacInnes Student Ice Arena

Rankings
- USCHO: NR
- USA Today: NR

Record
- Overall: 17–12–1
- Conference: 7–7–0–1–0–0
- Home: 9–4–0
- Road: 8–8–1
- Neutral: 0–0–0

Coaches and captains
- Head coach: Joe Shawhan
- Assistant coaches: Chris Brooks; Dallas Steward; Jamie Phillips
- Captain: Alec Broetzman
- Alternate captain(s): Trenton Bliss; Eric Gotz; Colin Swoyer

The 2020–21 Michigan Tech Huskies men's ice hockey season was the 100th season of play for the program and the 59th in the WCHA conference. The Huskies represented Michigan Technological University and were coached by Joe Shawhan, in his 4th season.

== Season ==
As a result of the ongoing COVID-19 pandemic the entire college ice hockey season was delayed. Because the NCAA had previously announced that all winter sports athletes would retain whatever eligibility they possessed through at least the following year, none of Michigan Tech's players would lose a season of play. However, the NCAA also approved a change in its transfer regulations that would allow players to transfer and play immediately rather than having to sit out a season, as the rules previously required.

Michigan Tech got off to a bumpy start but quickly recovered and pulled themselves into the top-20 by late January. As sophomore netminder Blake Pietila was establishing himself as the team's starter, the Huskies were able to play a majority of their games without interruptions from COVID-19. Tech lost its ranking after getting swept at the end of the month but then reeled off seven consecutive wins. The only downside was that their opponents in six of those games were some of the worse teams in college hockey in 2021, so MTU could only get up to 18th in the rankings. When they did play good teams, the Huskies were able to compete on defense but the scoring was reduced to a paltry amount. In their final 8 games against teams that were in the top-20 at some point, MTU scored more than 1 goal twice and lost all but one contest. As a result of their failures against good teams, the Huskies had only a slim chance to make the NCAA Tournament without a WCHA championship. Being swept in the quarterfinals effectively ended the Huskies' campaign.

Cayden Bailey, Jed Pietila and Marcus Russell sat out the season.

== Departures ==
Player	Position	Nationality	Cause
Robbie Beydoun	Goaltender	United States	Transferred to Wisconsin
Ray Brice	Forward	United States	Graduation (signed with Macon Mayhem)
Seamus Donohue	Defenseman	United States	Transferred to St. Cloud State
Keegan Ford	Defenseman	United States	Left program
Matt Jurusik	Goaltender	United States	Graduation (signed with Texas Stars)
Todd Kiilunen	Defenseman	United States	Graduation
Mitch Meek	Defenseman	Canada	Transferred to Long Island
Zach Noble	Forward	United States	Left program
Alex Smith	Forward/Defenseman	Canada	Graduation

== Recruiting ==
Player	Position	Nationality	Age	Notes
Tristan Ashbrook	Forward	United States	22	Manistique, MI; transfer from Rensselaer
Cayden Bailey	Goaltender	United States	21	Estero, FL
Carson Bantle	Forward	United States	20	Onalaska, WI; Selected 142nd overall in 2020
Arvid Caderoth	Forward	Sweden	20	Gothenburg, SWE
Rylan Mosley	Forward	Canada	20	Arnprior, ON
Nick Nardella	Forward	United States	21	Rosemont, IL
Jed Pietila	Defenseman	United States	21	Howell, MI
Blais Richartz	Forward	United States	20	Menomonie, WI
Mark Sinclair	Goaltender	Canada	21	Hamilton, ON; transfer from Alabama–Huntsville
Brett Thorne	Defenseman	Canada	21	Brampton, ON

== Roster ==
As of January 20, 2021.

No.	Nat.	Player	Class	Pos	Height	Weight	DoB	Hometown	Previous team	NHL rights
2	(Canada)	Ryland Mosley	Freshman	F	5' 11" (1.8 m)	185 lb (84 kg)	2000-02-15	Arnprior, Ontario	Carleton Place (CCHL)	—
3	(Canada)	Tyrell Buckley	Junior	D	6' 0" (1.83 m)	195 lb (88 kg)	1997-03-01	Penticton, British Columbia	Merritt (BCHL)	—
4	(United States)	Chris Lipe	Sophomore	D	6' 1" (1.85 m)	195 lb (88 kg)	1999-11-23	Rockford, Michigan	Dubuque (USHL)	—
5	(United States)	Brenden Datema	Sophomore	D	6' 5" (1.96 m)	220 lb (100 kg)	1999-03-18	Sterling Heights, Michigan	Amarillo (NAHL)	—
6	(United States)	Cooper Watson	Senior	D	6' 3" (1.91 m)	195 lb (88 kg)	1996-04-18	Appleton, Wisconsin	Vernon (BCHL)	—
7	(United States)	Nick Nardella	Freshman	F	5' 10" (1.78 m)	174 lb (79 kg)	1999-02-09	Rosemont, Illinois	Janesville (NAHL)	—
8	(United States)	David Raisanen	Senior	F	6' 5" (1.96 m)	215 lb (98 kg)	1998-01-17	Cokato, Minnesota	Minot (NAHL)	—
9	(United States)	Tommy Parrottino	Junior	F	6' 0" (1.83 m)	170 lb (77 kg)	1998-03-03	Rochester Hills, Michigan	Youngstown (USHL)	—
10	(United States)	Jake Crespi	Sophomore	F	6' 0" (1.83 m)	190 lb (86 kg)	1998-12-10	Brighton, Michigan	Tri-City (USHL)	—
11	(United States)	Carson Bantle	Freshman	F	6' 4" (1.93 m)	201 lb (91 kg)	2002-01-22	Onalaska, Wisconsin	Madison (USHL)	ARI, 142nd overall 2020
12	(United States)	Brian Halonen	Junior	F	6' 0" (1.83 m)	207 lb (94 kg)	1999-01-11	Delano, Minnesota	Des Moines (USHL)	—
13	(United States)	Logan Pietila	Sophomore	F	5' 11" (1.8 m)	165 lb (75 kg)	2000-01-27	Howell, Michigan	Dubuque (USHL)	—
14	(Canada)	Logan Ganie	Sophomore	F	5' 10" (1.78 m)	175 lb (79 kg)	1999-06-28	Irma, Alberta	Spruce Grove (AJHL)	—
15	(Canada)	Parker Saretsky	Sophomore	F	6' 0" (1.83 m)	175 lb (79 kg)	1999-04-23	Wainwright, Alberta	Spruce Grove (AJHL)	—
16	(United States)	T.J. Polglaze	Junior	F	5' 11" (1.8 m)	175 lb (79 kg)	1997-02-17	Beloit, Wisconsin	Janesville (NAHL)	—
17	(United States)	Justin Misiak	Senior	F	5' 10" (1.78 m)	178 lb (81 kg)	1996-04-25	St. Clair Shores, Michigan	Austin (NAHL)	—
18	(Canada)	Greyson Reitmeier	Senior	F	6' 4" (1.93 m)	208 lb (94 kg)	1996-05-16	Nakusp, British Columbia	Flin Flon (SJHL)	—
19	(United States)	Eric Gotz (A)	Junior	D	5' 10" (1.78 m)	181 lb (82 kg)	1998-04-23	Hermantown, Minnesota	Minnesota Wilderness (NAHL)	—
20	(Sweden)	Arvid Caderoth	Freshman	F	6' 4" (1.93 m)	215 lb (98 kg)	2000-05-14	Askim, Sweden	Frölunda J20 (J20 SuperElit)	—
21	(United States)	Blais Richartz	Freshman	F	6' 0" (1.83 m)	183 lb (83 kg)	2000-06-23	Menomonie, Wisconsin	Lincoln (USHL)	—
22	(United States)	Tyler Rockwell	Senior	D	5' 8" (1.73 m)	160 lb (73 kg)	1996-06-27	San Jose, California	Wenatchee (BCHL)	—
23	(United States)	Trenton Bliss (A)	Junior	F	6' 0" (1.83 m)	192 lb (87 kg)	1998-03-16	Appleton, Wisconsin	Green Bay (USHL)	—
24	(United States)	Colin Swoyer (A)	Junior	D	6' 0" (1.83 m)	185 lb (84 kg)	1998-03-31	Hinsdale, Illinois	Sioux Falls (USHL)	—
25	(United States)	Jed Pietila	Freshman	D	6' 0" (1.83 m)	181 lb (82 kg)	1999-01-13	Howell, Michigan	Austin (NAHL)	—
26	(United States)	Marcus Russell	Senior	F	5' 9" (1.75 m)	175 lb (79 kg)	1996-03-06	Traverse City, Michigan	Sioux Falls (USHL)	—
27	(Canada)	Brett Thorne	Freshman	D	6' 2" (1.88 m)	190 lb (86 kg)	1998-03-15	Bedford, Nova Scotia	Carleton Place (CCHL)	—
28	(United States)	Tristan Ashbrook	Sophomore	F	5' 11" (1.8 m)	175 lb (79 kg)	1998-07-16	Manistique, Michigan	RPI (ECAC)	—
29	(United States)	Alec Broetzman (C)	Junior	F	6' 0" (1.83 m)	200 lb (91 kg)	1997-02-05	Hudson, Wisconsin	Madison (USHL)	—
30	(Canada)	Mark Sinclair	Senior	G	6' 0" (1.83 m)	180 lb (82 kg)	1996-03-08	Dundas, Ontario	Alabama–Huntsville (WCHA)	—
31	(United States)	Blake Pietila	Sophomore	G	5' 11" (1.8 m)	164 lb (74 kg)	2000-01-27	Howell, Michigan	Cedar Rapids (USHL)	—
35	(United States)	Cayden Bailey	Freshman	G	5' 11" (1.8 m)	181 lb (82 kg)	1999-09-21	Estero, Florida	Lone Star (NAHL)	—

== Standings ==
2020–21 Western Collegiate Hockey Association Standings
	Conference record										Overall record					
	GP	W	L	T	OTW	OTL	3/SW	PTS	GF	GA	GP	W	L	T	GF	GA
#4 Minnesota State †	14	13	1	0	1	1	0	39	56	15	27	22	5	1	100	46
#14 Lake Superior State *	14	9	5	0	2	2	0	27	39	34	29	19	7	3	86	63
#18 Bowling Green	14	8	5	1	0	2	0	27	46	34	31	20	10	1	108	67
#10 Bemidji State	14	8	5	1	3	2	0	24	42	34	29	16	10	3	82	70
Michigan Tech	14	7	7	0	1	0	0	20	38	35	30	17	12	1	78	63
Northern Michigan	14	6	7	1	2	2	1	20	40	47	29	11	17	1	79	103
Alabama–Huntsville	14	3	11	0	1	0	0	8	18	49	22	3	18	1	31	80
Ferris State	14	0	13	1	0	1	1	3	28	59	25	1	23	1	55	103
Alaska	0	-	-	-	-	-	-	-	-	-	0	-	-	-	-	-
Alaska Anchorage	0	-	-	-	-	-	-	-	-	-	0	-	-	-	-	-
Championship: March 20, 2021 † indicates conference regular season champion * indicates conference tournament champion Rankings: USCHO.com Top 20 Poll

== Schedule and results ==
Date	Time	Opponent^{#}	Rank^{#}	Site	TV	Decision	Result	Attendance	Record
Regular season
November 21	4:54 PM	at Lake Superior State*		Taffy Abel Arena • Sault Ste. Marie, Michigan		Sinclair	T 0–0 ^{SOL}	8	0–0–1
November 22	3:07 PM	at Lake Superior State*		Taffy Abel Arena • Sault Ste. Marie, Michigan		Sinclair	L 1–4	0	0–1–1
December 6	6:07 PM	vs. #6 Minnesota State*		MacInnes Student Ice Arena • Houghton, Michigan		Pietila	W 3–1	0	1–1–1
December 7	5:07 PM	vs. #6 Minnesota State*		MacInnes Student Ice Arena • Houghton, Michigan		Pietila	L 0–2	0	1–2–1
December 12	5:07 PM	at Bemidji State*		Sanford Center • Bemidji, Minnesota		Sinclair	L 3–6	105	1–3–1
December 13	3:07 PM	at Bemidji State*		Sanford Center • Bemidji, Minnesota		Pietila	W 3–0	105	2–3–1
December 18	7:07 PM	vs. Northern Michigan*		MacInnes Student Ice Arena • Houghton, Michigan		Pietila	W 4–3 ^{OT}	0	3–3–1
December 19	6:07 PM	at Northern Michigan*		Berry Events Center • Marquette, Michigan		Pietila	W 3–1	0	4–3–1
January 2	6:07 PM	vs. Alabama–Huntsville		MacInnes Student Ice Arena • Houghton, Michigan	FloHockey.tv	Pietila	W 4–0	200	5–3–1 (1–0–0)
January 3	2:07 PM	vs. Alabama–Huntsville*		MacInnes Student Ice Arena • Houghton, Michigan	FloHockey.tv	Sinclair	W 4–0	200	6–3–1 (2–0–0)
January 23	4:07 PM	vs. Northern Michigan*		MacInnes Student Ice Arena • Houghton, Michigan		Sinclair	W 2–0	200	7–3–1
January 25	5:07 PM	vs. Northern Michigan*	#18	Berry Events Center • Marquette, Michigan		Pietila	W 4–1	0	8–3–1
January 29	7:07 PM	at #8 Bowling Green	#18	Slater Family Ice Arena • Bowling Green, Ohio	FloHockey.tv	Pietila	L 3–6	300	8–4–1 (2–1–0)
January 30	7:07 PM	at #8 Bowling Green	#18	Slater Family Ice Arena • Bowling Green, Ohio	FloHockey.tv	Pietila	L 2–5	300	8–5–1 (2–2–0)
February 2	7:07 PM	at Ferris State		Ewigleben Arena • Big Rapids, Michigan	FloHockey.tv	Pietila	W 6–4	250	9–5–1 (3–2–0)
February 5	8:00 PM	at Alabama–Huntsville*		Von Braun Center • Huntsville, Alabama		Sinclair	W 3–1	1,433	10–5–1
February 6	6:00 PM	at Alabama–Huntsville*		Von Braun Center • Huntsville, Alabama		Pietila	W 4–1	1,373	11–5–1
February 9	4:07 PM	at Ferris State		Ewigleben Arena • Big Rapids, Michigan	FloHockey.tv	Pietila	W 2–1	175	12–5–1 (4–2–0)
February 12	7:07 PM	vs. Ferris State*		MacInnes Student Ice Arena • Houghton, Michigan		Pietila	W 3–0	300	13–5–1
February 13	6:07 PM	vs. Ferris State*		MacInnes Student Ice Arena • Houghton, Michigan		Pietila	W 5–1	300	14–5–1
February 16	2:07 PM	vs. #20 Lake Superior State	#18	MacInnes Student Ice Arena • Houghton, Michigan	FloHockey.tv	Pietila	L 1–3	300	14–6–1 (4–3–0)
February 19	7:07 PM	vs. Bemidji State	#18	MacInnes Student Ice Arena • Houghton, Michigan	FloHockey.tv	Pietila	L 1–4	300	14–7–1 (4–4–0)
February 20	6:07 PM	vs. Bemidji State	#18	MacInnes Student Ice Arena • Houghton, Michigan	FloHockey.tv	Sinclair	L 1–2	300	14–8–1 (4–5–0)
February 23	2:07 PM	vs. #18 Lake Superior State	#20	MacInnes Student Ice Arena • Houghton, Michigan	FloHockey.tv	Pietila	W 4–1	300	15–8–1 (5–5–0)
February 26	7:07 PM	vs. Northern Michigan	#20	MacInnes Student Ice Arena • Houghton, Michigan	FloHockey.tv	Pietila	W 6–1	300	16–8–1 (6–5–0)
February 27	6:07 PM	vs. Northern Michigan	#20	Berry Events Center • Marquette, Michigan	FloHockey.tv	Pietila	W 3–2 ^{OT}	250	17–8–1 (7–5–0)
March 5	6:07 PM	vs. #4 Minnesota State	#19	Mayo Clinic Health System Event Center • Mankato, Minnesota	FloHockey.tv	Pietila	L 1–2	250	17–9–1 (7–6–0)
March 6	6:07 PM	vs. #4 Minnesota State	#19	Mayo Clinic Health System Event Center • Mankato, Minnesota	FloHockey.tv	Pietila	L 2–3	250	17–10–1 (7–7–0)
WCHA Tournament
March 12	7:07 PM	at #15 Bemidji State*		Sanford Center • Bemidji, Minnesota (WCHA Quarterfinals Game 1)		Pietila	L 1–3	250	17–11–1
March 13	6:07 PM	at #15 Bemidji State*		Sanford Center • Bemidji, Minnesota (WCHA Quarterfinals Game 2)		Pietila	L 1–4	250	17–12–1
*Non-conference game. ^{#}Rankings from USCHO.com Poll. All times are in Eastern Time.

== Scoring statistics ==
Name	Position	Games	Goals	Assists	Points	PIM
Trenton Bliss	F	29	12	13	25	27
Alec Broetzman	LW	30	13	8	21	16
Brian Halonen	LW	28	8	10	18	16
Arvid Caderoth	C/RW	30	2	16	18	12
Colin Swoyer	D	30	3	14	17	24
Eric Gotz	D	30	3	11	14	12
Tristan Ashbrook	RW	20	7	5	12	0
Justin Misiak	C	28	4	8	12	8
Tyler Rockwell	D	30	4	7	11	12
Nick Nardella	F	22	2	7	9	10
Chris Lipe	D	29	1	8	9	4
Jake Crespi	RW	26	5	3	8	8
Tommy Parrottino	F	22	6	1	7	2
Brett Thorne	D	30	1	6	7	29
Parker Saretsky	F	29	0	6	6	4
Blais Richartz	F	17	1	3	4	2
Logan Pietila	F	28	0	4	4	2
Carson Bantle	LW	19	2	1	3	22
Logan Ganie	LW	20	2	1	3	8
Ryland Mosley	LW	13	1	1	2	6
Tyrell Buckley	D	29	1	1	2	12
Brenden Datema	D	9	0	1	1	7
Greyson Reitmeier	C/LW	11	0	1	1	2
Blake Pietila	G	24	0	1	1	0
Cooper Watson	D	2	0	0	0	2
David Raisanen	F	2	0	0	0	0
T. J. Polglaze	F	7	0	0	0	2
Mark Sinclair	G	8	0	0	0	0
Bench	-	-	-	-	-	8
Total			78	137	215	257

== Goaltending statistics ==
Name	Games	Minutes	Wins	Losses	Ties	Goals against	Saves	Shut outs	SV %	GAA
Blake Pietila	24	1394	14	9	0	42	596	3	.934	1.81
Mark Sinclair	8	398	3	3	1	15	132	2	.898	2.26
Empty Net	-	16	-	-	-	6	-	-	-	-
Total	30	1810	17	12	1	63	728	5	.920	2.09

== Rankings ==
Poll	Week																					
Poll	Pre	1	2	3	4	5	6	7	8	9	10	11	12	13	14	15	16	17	18	19	20	21 (Final)
USCHO.com	NR	NR	NR	NR	NR	NR	NR	NR	NR	NR	NR	18	NR	NR	18	20	19	NR	NR	NR	-	NR
USA Today	NR	NR	NR	NR	NR	NR	NR	NR	NR	NR	NR	NR	NR	NR	NR	NR	NR	NR	NR	NR	NR	NR

USCHO did not release a poll in week 20.

== Awards and honors ==
Player	Award	Ref
Colin Swoyer	WCHA Second Team	
Trenton Bliss	WCHA Third Team	
Arvid Caderoth	WCHA Rookie Team	

== Players drafted into the NHL ==
=== 2021 NHL entry draft ===
Round	Pick	Player	NHL team
6	162	Kyle Kukkonen^{†}	Anaheim Ducks

† incoming freshman
