= Dryden McKay =

American ice hockey player

- Born: November 25, 1997 (age 28) Downers Grove, Illinois, U.S.
- Height: 5 ft 11 in (180 cm)
- Weight: 174 lb (79 kg; 12 st 6 lb)
- Position: Goaltender
- Catches: Left
- ECHL team Former teams: Bloomington Bison; Toronto Marlies; Ontario Reign
- NHL draft: Undrafted
- Playing career: 2022–present

Dryden Dowd McKay (born November 25, 1997) is an American professional ice hockey goaltender for the Bloomington Bison of the ECHL. After posting a shutout in a 1–0 win over St. Cloud State on October 8, 2021, McKay tied the record for career shutouts in NCAA DI men's hockey history with 26 career shutouts. He later won the 2022 Hobey Baker Award as the best NCAA men's ice hockey player.

== Early life ==
McKay was born on November 25, 1997, in Downers Grove, Illinois. Father Ross McKay was a former goaltender who played one game in the National Hockey League for the Hartford Whalers in 1991. He was named after Montreal Canadiens goaltender Ken Dryden and wears number 29 in his honor. Although he grew up a fan of Carey Price, McKay favored Jaroslav Halák and Juuse Saros as inspirations due to their shared lack of height.

== Career ==
=== Amateur ===
On May 6, 2014, McKay was drafted by the Waterloo Black Hawks in the United States Hockey League (USHL) Draft. Prior to the 2015 Corpus Christi IceRays Main Camp, the team acquired McKay in exchange for a 2015–16 goaltender and a conditional 2016 draft pick. In December of that year, McKay was recalled by the Green Bay Gamblers of the USHL for six games.

On November 18, 2016, McKay signed a Letter of Intent to play NCAA Division I ice hockey for the Holy Cross Crusaders of the College of the Holy Cross. However, after signing, he realized his family could not afford tuition and asked to de-commit but the school refused. After going through two appeals, he was allowed to de-commit and agreed to play with the Minnesota State Mavericks instead. McKay later said he chose Minnesota State because of its proximity to his family, hockey facilities and coaching staff, and their business program.

=== Collegiate ===
In his rookie season, McKay competed against Mathias Israelsson for the starting goaltender position. He started the first four games of the season, posting a 3–1–0 record, before sitting for seven consecutive games so Israelsson could start. McKay said he and Israelsson worked together on and off the ice to improve themselves. He also praised the veteran goaltender saying: "He’s probably one of the hardest working and most prepared players — not just goalies — I’ve ever seen or played with...Just to see how hard he worked and how he treated his body, how he prepared every day, he was pretty consistent in practice." Following this, he cemented the starting role and posted an 11–4–1 record with a .919 save percentage by January. As the starting goaltender, McKay was the recipient of five WCHA Goaltender of the Week accolades and WCHA Goaltender of the Month and HCA National Goaltender of the Month in February. He finished the year with a .927 save percentage and 1.76 Goals against average (GAA) for an overall record of 24–7–2 through 32 starts. At the conclusion of the season, McKay was named College Hockey News' 2018-19 Rookie of the Year, and was selected for both the All-WCHA Second Team and All-WCHA Rookie Team.

McKay returned to the Mavericks for his sophomore season, which, despite being shortened due to the COVID-19 pandemic, was a record breaking campaign for him. During a game against the Northern Michigan Wildcats on February 8, McKay set a new Minnesota State record for most career shutouts with 12, which surpassed the previous record held by Cole Huggins. He concluded the regular season ranking first in the country with 1.31 goals against average and a .942 save percentage. As a result of his play, McKay was named a First Team All-American and listed as a finalist for the Hobey Baker Award. He was also the recipient of the WCHA Goaltender of the Year, All-WCHA First Team, WCHA Scholar-Athlete, and WCHA All-Academic. As the Mavericks beat the Alaska Anchorage in their first-round playoff series, he established a Minnesota State goaltending record for wins in a season.

When collegiate hockey resumed for the 2020–21 season, McKay continued to set new career and program records. After posting a shutout in a 5–0 win over Alabama–Huntsville Chargers on February 12, 2021, McKay ranked second all-time in NCAA DI men's hockey history with 22 career shutouts. As a result of his play, McKay was the recipient of his second consecutive WCHA Goaltender of the Year award after concluding the season with a WCHA-record 1.07 GAA.

In his final collegiate season, McKay tied Ryan Miller for the record of NCAA career shutouts with 26 after posting a 1–0 shutout over St. Cloud State on October 8, 2021. He continued his dominant play throughout the regular season and by February led the country in wins with nine shutouts. As such, McKay was named a semifinalist for the Mike Richter Award as the top netminder in college hockey. Later, in March, McKay tied with Robb Stauber and Marty Turco for most single-season men's Division I wins with his 34th victory of the season. Upon reaching this milestone, Northern Michigan coach Grant Potulny called McKay "the best player in college hockey." He subsequently helped the Mavericks qualify for the 2022 Frozen Four with a record of 38–4 and ranked second in goals against. After eliminating Minnesota in the Frozen Four semifinals, McKay won the 2022 Hobey Baker Award as the best NCAA men's ice hockey player becoming just the third goaltender to win the award after Robb Stauber in 1988 and Ryan Miller in 2001.

Following the conclusion of his collegiate career, McKay announced that he had accepted a six-month ban imposed on him from the United States Anti-Doping Agency as a result of him taking a banned substance. The positive test of Ostarine was the result of him taking contaminated Quercetin vitamins as protection from COVID-19.

=== Professional ===
Elliotte Friedman of Sportsnet reported on Monday, April 25, 2022, that McKay would be signing as a free agent with the Toronto Maple Leafs of the NHL; this ultimately became a deal with Toronto's AHL affiliate, the Toronto Marlies, though McKay spent the majority of the first year of his two year deal with Toronto's ECHL affiliate, the Newfoundland Growlers.

At the conclusion of his contract with the Marlies, McKay left as a free agent and was signed to a one-year AHL contract with the Ontario Reign on July 12, 2024.

Unable to find a footing in the AHL following three seasons, McKay was signed to a one-year ECHL contract with the Utah Grizzlies on July 8, 2025.

== Career statistics ==
			Regular season									Playoffs
Season	Team	League	GP	W	L	T/OT	MIN	GA	SO	GAA	SV%	GP	W	L	MIN	GA	SO	GAA	SV%
2014–15	Springfield Jr. Blues	NAHL	37	15	18	2	2142	99	2	2.77	.917	—	—	—	—	—	—	—	—
2015–16	Corpus Christi IceRays	NAHL	34	15	14	2	1966	81	1	2.47	.921	—	—	—	—	—	—	—	—
2015–16	Green Bay Gamblers	USHL	1	0	0	0	11	2	0	11.39	.667	—	—	—	—	—	—	—	—
2016–17	Madison Capitols	USHL	39	18	17	3	2291	103	2	2.70	.917	—	—	—	—	—	—	—	—
2017–18	Madison Capitols	USHL	49	19	24	2	2754	155	0	3.38	.907	—	—	—	—	—	—	—	—
2018–19	Minnesota State	WCHA	34	24	7	2	2011	59	4	1.76	.927	—	—	—	—	—	—	—	—
2019–20	Minnesota State	WCHA	37	30	4	2	2156	47	10	1.31	.942	—	—	—	—	—	—	—	—
2020–21	Minnesota State	WCHA	26	21	4	0	1522	39	10	1.54	.924	—	—	—	—	—	—	—	—
2021–22	Minnesota State	CCHA	43	38	5	0	2561	56	10	1.31	.931	—	—	—	—	—	—	—	—
2022–23	Newfoundland Growlers	ECHL	33	19	10	1	1842	94	1	3.06	.900	12	8	3	683	31	2	2.72	.901
2022–23	Toronto Marlies	AHL	2	1	0	1	124	7	0	3.38	.885	—	—	—	—	—	—	—	—
2023–24	Newfoundland Growlers	ECHL	35	8	16	6	1386	77	2	3.33	.897	—	—	—	—	—	—	—	—
2024–25	Greenville Swamp Rabbits	ECHL	35	12	17	5	1922	94	2	2.93	.910	—	—	—	—	—	—	—	—
2024–25	Ontario Reign	AHL	1	0	1	0	4	60	0	4.00	.889	—	—	—	—	—	—	—	—
2024–25	Bloomington Bison	ECHL	7	3	4	0	390	18	0	2.77	.919	—	—	—	—	—	—	—	—
2025–26	Utah Grizzlies	ECHL	4	1	3	0	236	11	0	2.80	.905	—	—	—	—	—	—	—	—
2025–26	Bloomington Bison	ECHL	41	24	16	1	2404	101	4	2.52	.918	—	—	—	—	—	—	—	—
NCAA totals			140	113	20	4	8,250	201	34	1.46	.932	—	—	—	—	—	—	—	—

== Awards and honors ==
Award	Year	Ref
College
All-WCHA Rookie Team	2018–19	
All-WCHA Second Team	2018–19	
All-WCHA First Team	2019–20, 2020–21	
AHCA West First Team All-American	2019–20, 2021–22	
AHCA West Second Team All-American	2020–21	
CCHA Goaltender of the Year	2021–22	
All-CCHA First Team	2021–22	
Hobey Baker Award	2022	

Awards and achievements
Preceded by Atte Tolvanen	WCHA Goaltender of the Year; 2019–20, 2020–21	Succeeded by Award Discontinued
Preceded by Marc Michaelis	WCHA Player of the Year; 2020–21	Succeeded by Award Discontinued
Preceded by Brady Hjelle	CCHA Goaltender of the Year; 2021–22	Succeeded by Blake Pietila
Preceded by Austin Czarnik	CCHA Player of the Year; 2021–22	Succeeded by Blake Pietila
Preceded by Cole Caufield	Hobey Baker Award; 2021–22	Succeeded by Adam Fantilli
