= Hampus Eriksson =

Swedish ice hockey player

- Born: September 11, 1996 (age 28); Gävle, Sweden
- Height: 6 ft 4 in (193 cm)
- Weight: 198 lb (90 kg; 14 st 2 lb)
- Position: Forward
- Shoots: Left
- SHL team: Brynäs IF
- NHL draft: Undrafted
- Playing career: 2015–present

Hampus Eriksson (born September 11, 1996) is a Swedish ice hockey player. He is currently playing with Brynäs IF of the Swedish Hockey League (SHL).

Eriksson made his Swedish Hockey League debut playing with Brynäs IF during the 2014–15 SHL season.
