= 2017–18 Alabama–Huntsville Chargers men's ice hockey season =

American college ice hockey team season

2017–18 Alabama–Huntsville Chargers men's ice hockey
- Conference: Western Collegiate Hockey Association
- Record: 12–23–2 (10–16–2 WCHA)
- Head coach: Mike Corbett (5th season)
- Assistant coaches: Gavin Morgan; Matty Thomas
- Home stadium: Propst Arena at the Von Braun Center

The 2017–18 Alabama–Huntsville Chargers ice hockey team represented the University of Alabama in Huntsville in the 2017–18 NCAA Division I men's ice hockey season. The Chargers were coached by Mike Corbett who was in his fifth season as head coach. His assistant coaches were Gavin Morgan and Matty Thomas. The Chargers played their home games in the Propst Arena at the Von Braun Center and competed in the Western Collegiate Hockey Association.

== Recruiting ==
UAH added 8 freshmen for the 2017–18 season, including 2 goalies, 5 forwards and 1 defenseman.

Player	Position	Nationality	Notes
Josh Astorino	Goalie	Canada	Niagara Falls, Ontario; 2016–17 OJHL Goaltender of the Year and First Team All-Star, 2016–17 OJHL Champion with the Georgetown Raiders
Andrew Dodson	Forward	Canada	Milton, Ontario; Former Carleton Place Canadians captain, won 4 CCHL championships with Carleton Place
Connor Merkley	Forward	Canada	Portland, Ontario; Former Carleton Place Canadians alternate captain, 2016–17 CCHL Second Team All-Star, won 3 CCHL championships with Carleton Place
Christian Rajic	Forward	Canada	Oakville, Ontario; Former Oakville Blades alternate captain
Teddy Rotenberger	Defenseman	United States	Huntsville, Alabama
Mark Sinclair	Goalie	Canada	Dundas, Ontario; 2014–15 and 2015–16 GOJHL champion with the Caledonia Corvairs
Connor Wood	Forward	United States	Buford, Georgia
Levi Wunder	Forward	United States	Escanaba, Michigan; Former Escanaba Senior High School captain, 2015 Michigan High School "Dream Team", 2015–16 AJHL All-Rookie Team

== Roster ==
=== Departures from 2016–17 team ===
- Hunter Anderson, F, transferred to University of Wisconsin–Stout (NCAA D-III)
- Brandon Carlson, F, graduated, signed with the Wichita Thunder (ECHL)
- Brent Fletcher, F, graduated
- Carmine Guerriero, F, graduated, signed with the South Carolina Stingrays (ECHL)
- Jetlan Houcher, F
- Matt Larose, F, graduated, signed with HC 07 Detva (Slovak Extraliga)
- Cody Marooney, F, graduated
- Matt Salhany, F, graduated, signed with the Reading Royals (ECHL)
- Regan Soquila, F, graduated

=== 2017–18 team ===
No.	Nat.	Player	Class	Pos	Height	Weight	DoB	Hometown	Previous team
2		Cam Knight	Junior	D	6' 1" (1.85 m)	195 lb (88 kg)	1995-01-10	North Reading, Massachusetts	Wichita Falls (NAHL)
4		Connor James	Sophomore	D	5' 9" (1.75 m)	170 lb (77 kg)	1996-10-11	Wainwright, Alberta	Spruce Grove (AJHL)
5		Cody Champagne	Senior	D	5' 11" (1.8 m)	185 lb (84 kg)	1994-08-09	Brookfield, Connecticut	Topeka (NAHL)
6		Sean Rappleyea	Sophomore	D	5' 11" (1.8 m)	175 lb (79 kg)	1995-02-03	Sayreville, New Jersey	Ottawa (CCHL)
7		Max McHugh (C)	Senior	F	5' 10" (1.78 m)	180 lb (82 kg)	1993-08-20	Seattle, Washington	Dubuque (USHL)
8		John Teets	Junior	D	6' 3" (1.91 m)	205 lb (93 kg)	1994-08-10	Fairbanks, Alaska	Fairbanks (NAHL)
9		Christian Rajic	Freshman	F	5' 10" (1.78 m)	165 lb (75 kg)	1997-02-06	Oakville, Ontario	Oakville (OJHL)
10		Andrew Dodson	Freshman	F	5' 9" (1.75 m)	180 lb (82 kg)	1996-10-24	Milton, Ontario	Carleton Place (CCHL)
11		Levi Wunder	Freshman	F	5' 9" (1.75 m)	165 lb (75 kg)	1996-10-11	Escanaba, Michigan	Odessa (NAHL)
12		Connor Merkley	Freshman	F	6' 1" (1.85 m)	190 lb (86 kg)	1996-09-03	Portland, Ontario	Carleton Place (CCHL)
14		Madison Dunn	Junior	F	5' 8" (1.73 m)	165 lb (75 kg)	1995-10-04	Calgary, Alberta	Brooks (AJHL)
15		Hans Gorowsky	Junior	F	5' 10" (1.78 m)	180 lb (82 kg)	1994-12-20	Lino Lakes, Minnesota	Fairbanks (NAHL)
16		Connor Wood	Freshman	F	5' 8" (1.73 m)	180 lb (82 kg)	1996-08-09	Buford, Georgia	Odessa (NAHL)
18		Austin Beaulieu	Sophomore	F	5' 9" (1.75 m)	170 lb (77 kg)	1996-10-21	Coral Springs, Florida	Wichita Falls (CCHL)
19		Brandon Salerno	Sophomore	F	5' 8" (1.73 m)	155 lb (70 kg)	1995-07-31	Toronto, Ontario	Pickering (OJHL)
20		Brandon Parker	Senior	D	5' 10" (1.78 m)	175 lb (79 kg)	1993-02-17	Faribault, Minnesota	Brookings (NAHL)
21		Tyler Poulsen	Junior	F	5' 7" (1.7 m)	160 lb (73 kg)	1993-04-01	Arvada, Colorado	Topeka (NAHL)
22		Jordan Larson	Sophomore	F	5' 10" (1.78 m)	190 lb (86 kg)	1995-05-13	Fort Frances, Ontario	Carleton Place (CCHL)
24		Brennan Saulnier	Senior	F	6' 0" (1.83 m)	170 lb (77 kg)	1993-12-29	Halifax, Nova Scotia	Fort McMurray (AJHL)
25		Adam Wilcox	Junior	F	6' 1" (1.85 m)	210 lb (95 kg)	1994-04-25	Alpharetta, Georgia	Fairbanks (NAHL)
26		Josh Kestner	Senior	F	6' 0" (1.83 m)	170 lb (77 kg)	1993-11-08	Huntsville, Alabama	Sarnia (GOJHL)
27		Teddy Rotenberger	Freshman	D	5' 11" (1.8 m)	180 lb (82 kg)	1996-01-01	Huntsville, Alabama	Shreveport (NAHL)
28		Kurt Gosselin	Junior	D	6' 1" (1.85 m)	200 lb (91 kg)	1994-11-30	Brighton, Michigan	Alberni Valley (BCHL)
30		Mark Sinclair	Freshman	G	5' 11" (1.8 m)	170 lb (77 kg)	1996-03-08	Dundas, Ontario	Chilliwack (BCHL)
32		Jordan Uhelski	Senior	G	6' 1" (1.85 m)	195 lb (88 kg)	1993-08-04	Flint, Michigan	Muskegon (USHL)
33		Richard Buri	Senior	D	6' 5" (1.96 m)	215 lb (98 kg)	1994-01-12	Nitra, Slovakia	Minnesota (NAHL)
35		Josh Astorino	Freshman	G	6' 2" (1.88 m)	176 lb (80 kg)	1996-12-09	Niagara Falls, Ontario	Georgetown (OJHL)

== Schedule and results ==
- Green background indicates win.
- Red background indicates loss.
- Yellow background indicates tie.

Date	Time	Opponent	Site	Decision	Result	Attendance	Record
Regular Season
October 6	6:35 pm	at #8 Notre Dame*	Compton Family Ice Arena • South Bend, Indiana	Uhelski	L 3–5	3,885	0–1–0
October 7	6:05 pm	at #8 Notre Dame*	Compton Family Ice Arena • South Bend, Indiana	Sinclair	L 0–4	3,412	0–2–0
October 20	6:07 pm	at #15 Michigan Tech	MacInnes Student Ice Arena • Houghton, Michigan	Uhelski	L 4–5	2,923	0–3–0 (0–1–0)
October 21	6:07 pm	at #15 Michigan Tech	MacInnes Student Ice Arena • Houghton, Michigan	Uhelski	W 4–2	3,042	1–3–0 (1–1–0)
October 27	6:00 pm	at Cornell*	Lynah Rink • Ithaca, New York	Uhelski	L 1–5	3,277	1–4–0 (1–1–0)
October 28	6:00 pm	at Cornell*	Lynah Rink • Ithaca, New York	Uhelski	L 0–3	3,784	1–5–0 (1–1–0)
November 3	8:05 pm	at Arizona State*	Oceanside Ice Arena • Tempe, Arizona	Sinclair	L 2–3	738	1–6–0 (1–1–0)
November 4	8:05 pm	at Arizona State*	Oceanside Ice Arena • Tempe, Arizona	Uhelski	W 3–1	711	2–6–0 (1–1–0)
November 10	7:07 pm	Alaska Anchorage	Von Braun Center • Huntsville, Alabama	Uhelski	W 5–1	3,128	3–6–0 (2–1–0)
November 11	7:07 pm	Alaska Anchorage	Von Braun Center • Huntsville, Alabama	Uhelski	L 3–3 ^{SOL}	3,072	3–6–1 (2–1–1)
November 17	7:07 pm	Lake Superior	Von Braun Center • Huntsville, Alabama	Uhelski	L 1–3	1,319	3–7–1 (2–2–1)
November 18	7:07 pm	Lake Superior	Von Braun Center • Huntsville, Alabama	Uhelski	W 5–3	1,123	4–7–1 (3–2–1)
November 24	7:07 pm	Ferris State	Von Braun Center • Huntsville, Alabama	Sinclair	L 2–6	1,246	4–8–1 (3–3–1)
November 25	7:07 pm	Ferris State	Von Braun Center • Huntsville, Alabama	Uhelski	W 5–3	1,007	5–8–1 (4–3–1)
December 1	6:07 pm	at Northern Michigan	Berry Events Center • Marquette, Michigan	Uhelski	L 1–3	1,937	5–9–1 (4–4–1)
December 2	6:07 pm	at Northern Michigan	Berry Events Center • Marquette, Michigan	Uhelski	W 3–2	2,148	6–9–1 (5–4–1)
December 8	6:37 pm	at Bowling Green	Slater Family Ice Arena • Bowling Green, Ohio	Uhelski	W 3–3 ^{SOW}	1,847	6–9–2 (5–4–2)
December 9	6:07 pm	at Bowling Green	Slater Family Ice Arena • Bowling Green, Ohio	Uhelski	L 1–3	1,937	6–10–2 (5–5–2)
December 15	7:07 pm	at #7 Minnesota State	Verizon Wireless Center • Mankato, Minnesota	Uhelski	L 1–5	3,210	6–11–2 (5–6–2)
December 16	7:07 pm	at #7 Minnesota State	Verizon Wireless Center • Mankato, Minnesota	Sinclair	L 0–3	3,461	6–12–2 (5–7–2)
December 29	7:07 pm	at Bemidji State	Sanford Center • Bemidji, Minnesota	Uhelski	L 1–3	2,660	6–13–2 (5–8–2)
December 30	7:07 pm	at Bemidji State	Sanford Center • Bemidji, Minnesota	Uhelski	L 1–4	2,817	6–14–2 (5–9–2)
January 5	10:07 pm	at Alaska	Carlson Center • Fairbanks, Alaska	Sinclair	L 2–3	2,478	6–15–2 (5–10–2)
January 6	10:07 pm	at Alaska	Carlson Center • Fairbanks, Alaska	Uhelski	W 3–1	2,694	7–15–2 (6–10–2)
January 12	10:07 pm	at Alaska Anchorage	Sullivan Arena • Anchorage, Alaska	Uhelski	W 4–2	1,866	8–15–2 (7–10–2)
January 13	10:07 pm	at Alaska Anchorage	Sullivan Arena • Anchorage, Alaska	Uhelski	L 1–2	2,338	8–16–2 (7–11–2)
January 26	7:07 pm	Bemidji State	Von Braun Center • Huntsville, Alabama	Uhelski	W 5–1	2,071	9–16–2 (8–11–2)
January 27	7:07 pm	Bemidji State	Von Braun Center • Huntsville, Alabama	Uhelski	L 1–5	1,989	9–17–2 (8–12–2)
February 3	2:07 pm	#19 Northern Michigan	Von Braun Center • Huntsville, Alabama	Uhelski	L 3–4	1,718	9–18–2 (8–13–2)
February 4	2:07 pm	#19 Northern Michigan	Von Braun Center • Huntsville, Alabama	Uhelski	W 4–2	1,017	10–18–2 (9–13–2)
February 9	7:07 pm	#5 Minnesota State	Von Braun Center • Huntsville, Alabama	Uhelski	L 2–3 ^{OT}	1,278	10–19–2 (9–14–2)
February 10	7:07 pm	#5 Minnesota State	Von Braun Center • Huntsville, Alabama	Uhelski	L 1–6	1,785	10–20–2 (9–15–2)
February 23	7:07 pm	#15 Bowling Green	Von Braun Center • Huntsville, Alabama	Uhelski	W 3–2	1,472	11–20–2 (10–15–2)
February 24	7:07 pm	#15 Bowling Green	Von Braun Center • Huntsville, Alabama	Uhelski	L 0–3	1,363	11–21–2 (10–16–2)
WCHA Tournament
March 2	6:07 pm	at #19 Northern Michigan	Berry Events Center • Marquette, Michigan (Quarterfinals Game 1)	Uhelski	L 1–7	2,537	11–22–2 (10–16–2)
March 3	6:07 pm	at #19 Northern Michigan	Berry Events Center • Marquette, Michigan (Quarterfinals Game 2)	Uhelski	W 3–2	2,821	12–22–2 (10–16–2)
March 4	6:07 pm	at #19 Northern Michigan	Berry Events Center • Marquette, Michigan (Quarterfinals Game 3)	Uhelski	L 2–5	1,826	12–23–2 (10–16–2)
*Non-conference game. ^{#}Rankings from USCHO.com Poll. All times are in Central Time. Source:

=== Standings ===
2017–18 Western Collegiate Hockey Association standings
	Conference record								Overall record					
	GP	W	L	T	SOW	PTS	GF	GA	GP	W	L	T	GF	GA
#9 Minnesota State†	28	22	5	1	0	67	116	58	40	29	10	1	153	84
#20 Northern Michigan	28	19	7	2	2	61	85	64	43	25	15	3	130	108
Bowling Green	28	17	6	5	2	58	87	63	41	23	12	6	122	100
Bemidji State	28	13	9	6	4	49	77	63	38	16	14	8	103	95
#16 Michigan Tech*	28	12	11	5	2	43	82	75	44	22	17	5	134	117
Ferris State	28	11	16	1	0	34	68	86	38	14	23	1	87	122
Alabama–Huntsville	28	10	16	2	1	33	69	86	37	12	23	2	84	121
Alaska	28	9	17	2	1	30	74	85	36	11	22	3	97	118
Lake Superior State	28	8	17	3	0	27	59	90	36	10	22	4	76	121
Alaska Anchorage	28	4	21	3	3	18	55	102	34	4	26	4	65	124
Championship: March 17, 2018 † indicates conference regular season champion (MacNaughton Cup) * indicates conference tournament champion (Broadmoor Trophy); Rankings: USCHO.com Top 20 Poll; updated March 5, 2018

== Player stats ==
As of March 4, 2018

=== Skaters ===
Player	Pos	Yr	GP	G	A	Pts	PIM	PPG	SHG	GWG
Josh Kestner	F	Sr	37	24	8	32	30	9	0	2
Tyler Poulsen	F	Jr	35	9	17	26	18	3	0	1
Kurt Gosselin	D	Jr	37	5	11	16	52	3	0	0
Christian Rajic	F	Fr	37	9	6	15	18	2	0	1
Brennan Saulnier	F	Sr	30	8	7	15	121	4	0	2
Madison Dunn	F	Jr	37	5	10	15	10	0	2	1
Hans Gorowsky	F	Jr	37	5	7	12	42	2	0	0
Cam Knight	D	Jr	34	0	11	11	60	0	0	0
John Teets	D	Jr	37	3	6	9	14	0	1	1
Austin Beaulieu	F	So	37	3	6	9	23	0	0	2
Levi Wunder	F	Fr	37	2	7	9	2	0	0	1
Brandon Salerno	F	So	31	2	6	8	0	0	1	1
Brandon Parker	D	Sr	34	1	6	7	48	1	0	0
Max McHugh	F	Sr	11	3	3	6	8	2	0	0
Connor Merkley	F	Fr	35	2	4	6	12	1	0	0
Richard Buri	D	Sr	28	1	3	4	39	0	1	0
Connor Wood	F	Fr	22	0	3	3	20	0	0	0
Connor James	D	So	16	0	3	3	14	0	0	0
Adam Wilcox	F	Jr	29	2	0	2	11	0	0	0
Cody Champagne	D	Sr	37	0	2	2	20	0	0	0
Jordan Larson	F	So	10	0	2	2	0	0	0	0
Mark Sinclair	G	Fr	7	0	0	0	0	0	0	0
Jordan Uhelski	G	Sr	32	0	0	0	0	0	0	0
Andrew Dodson	F	Fr	18	0	0	0	8	0	0	0
Team			37	84	128	212	570	27	5	12

=== Goalies ===
Player	Yr	GP	TOI	W	L	T	GA	GAA	SV	SV%	SO
Jordan Uhelski	Sr	32	1852:00	12	18	2	94	3.05	912	0.907	0
Mark Sinclair	Fr	7	359:40	0	5	0	22	3.67	156	0.876	0
