= 2016–17 Alaska Anchorage Seawolves men's ice hockey season =

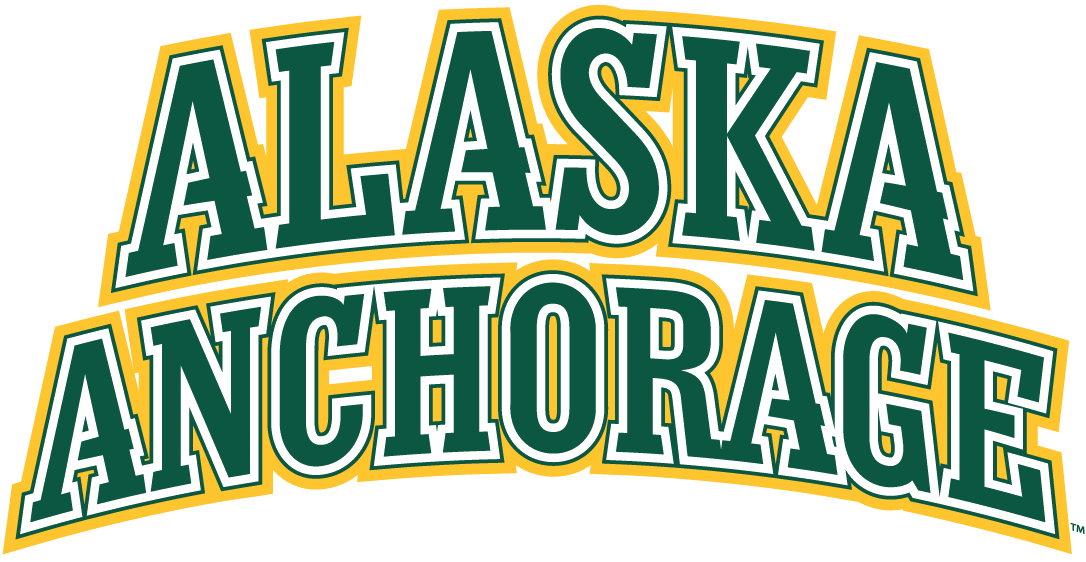
- Conference: 10th WCHA
- Home ice: Sullivan Arena

Rankings
- USCHO: NR
- USA Today: NR

Record
- Overall: 7–21–6
- Conference: 6–16–6–2
- Home: 4–10–2
- Road: 3–11–4
- Neutral: 0–0–0

Coaches and captains
- Head coach: Matt Thomas
- Assistant coaches: Joey Crabb; Barrett Heisten; Chris Kamal; Louis Mass
- Captain: Matt Anholt
- Alternate captain(s): Olivier Mantha; Chase Van Allen

The 2016–17 Alaska Anchorage Seawolves men's ice hockey season was the 38th season of play for the program, the 35th at the Division I level and the 24th in the WCHA conference. The Seawolves represented the University of Alaska Anchorage and were coached by Matt Thomas, in his 4th season.

== Season ==
After two subpar years, Alaska Anchorage was hoping to get back into the playoff picture. Unfortunately, the team got off to a dreadful start; the Seawolves won just one of their first 14 games and found themselves at the bottom of the WCHA. The team's outlook began to brighten in December when they won games in three separate weekends, including against ranked Bemidji State.

Alaska Anchorage continued to show improvement in the second half of the season, playing .500 hockey for two and a half months. After taking four points in their series against Lake Superior State, the Seawolves were just 5 points out of a playoff spot with four games to play. Their offense, however, failed down the stretch and the team was swept by Ferris State. With only two games against arch-rival Alaska remaining, the Seawolves had to win both games to have any chance at extending their season. When the Nanooks won the first match, it ended any postseason hopes for Anchorage and a second defeat gave UAF their 8th consecutive Governor's Cup.

== Departures ==
Player	Position	Nationality	Cause
Anthony Conti	Forward/Defenseman	Canada	Signed professional contract (Mississippi RiverKings)
Jared D'Amico	Forward	Canada	Left program (retired)
Tanner Dusyk	Forward	Canada	Left program (retired)
Wyatt Ege	Defenseman	United States	Transferred to Ohio State
Evan Hauser	Goaltender	United States	Transferred to Wisconsin–Stout
Blake Leask	Defenseman	Canada	Graduation (retired)
Luke McColgan	Forward	United States	Left program (retired)
Zack Rassell	Forward	Canada	Left program (retired)
Austin Sevalrud	Defenseman	Canada	Graduation (signed with Fort Wayne Komets)
Blake Tatchell	Forward	Canada	Graduation (signed with Lake Erie Monsters)
Chris Williams	Defenseman	United States	Graduation (signed with Norfolk Admirals)

== Recruiting ==
Player	Position	Nationality	Age	Notes
Aleksi Ainali	Forward	Finland	21	Vihti, FIN
Mason Anderson	Defenseman	United States	21	Anchorage, AK
Conor Deal	Forward	Canada	23	Anchorage, AK; transferred from Gustavus Adolphus
Tomi Hiekkavirta	Defenseman	Finland	20	Helsinki, FIN
Nolan Nicholas	Defenseman	Canada	21	Thunder Bay, ON
Rasmus Reijola	Goaltender	Finland	23	Vantaa, FIN; graduate transfer from St. Cloud State
Jonah Renouf	Forward	Canada	22	Mississauga, ON; transferred from Quinnipiac
Nathan Renouf	Forward	Canada	22	Mississauga, ON; transferred from Quinnipiac
David Trinkberger	Forward	Germany	20	Landshut, GER

== Roster ==
No.	Nat.	Player	Class	Pos	Height	Weight	DoB	Hometown	Previous team	NHL rights
2	(United States)	Chase Van Allen (A)	Senior	D	5' 10" (1.78 m)	181 lb (82 kg)	1992-07-30	Anchorage, Alaska	Alberni Valley Bulldogs (BCHL)	—
3	(Canada)	Eric Roberts	Sophomore	D	6' 2" (1.88 m)	203 lb (92 kg)	1995-01-27	Abbotsford, British Columbia	Chilliwack Chiefs (BCHL)	—
4	(Canada)	Tanner Johnson	Junior	D	6' 1" (1.85 m)	196 lb (89 kg)	1995-09-24	Castlegar, British Columbia	Langley Rivermen (BCHL)	—
6	(Canada)	Jarrett Brown	Junior	D	5' 11" (1.8 m)	194 lb (88 kg)	1994-01-13	Beaumont, Alberta	Cowichan Valley Capitals (BCHL)	—
7	(Canada)	Nolan Nicholas	Freshman	D	5' 11" (1.8 m)	203 lb (92 kg)	1995-09-24	Thunder Bay, Ontario	Sioux Falls Stampede (USHL)	—
8	(Canada)	Mason Mitchell	Sophomore	F	6' 2" (1.88 m)	205 lb (93 kg)	1994-06-13	Edmonton, Alberta	Calgary Mustangs (AJHL)	—
10	(Sweden)	Nicolas Erb Ekholm	Sophomore	F	6' 2" (1.88 m)	185 lb (84 kg)	1995-06-07	Malmö, Sweden	Malmö Redhawks J20 (J20 SuperElit)	—
11	(United States)	Austin Azurdia	Junior	F	6' 0" (1.83 m)	185 lb (84 kg)	1993-07-27	Wenatchee, Washington	Langley Rivermen (BCHL)	—
12	(United States)	Nils Rygaard	Sophomore	F	5' 11" (1.8 m)	190 lb (86 kg)	1995-04-11	Cheektowaga, New York	Janesville Jets (NAHL)	—
13	(Canada)	Dylan Hubbs	Senior	F	5' 9" (1.75 m)	170 lb (77 kg)	1992-10-31	Beaumont, Alberta	Olds Grizzlys (AJHL)	—
15	(United States)	Mason Anderson	Freshman	D	6' 2" (1.88 m)	161 lb (73 kg)	1995-02-23	Anchorage, Alaska	Weyburn Red Wings (SJHL)	—
16	(United States)	Connor Wright	Senior	F	5' 9" (1.75 m)	174 lb (79 kg)	1992-07-12	Anchorage, Alaska	Johnstown Tomahawks (NAHL)	—
17	(Canada)	Matt Anholt (C)	Senior	F	5' 10" (1.78 m)	185 lb (84 kg)	1994-05-15	Prince Albert, Saskatchewan	West Kelowna Warriors (BCHL)	—
18	(United States)	Bradley Duwe	Senior	F	6' 1" (1.85 m)	192 lb (87 kg)	1992-05-02	Soldotna, Alaska	Kenai River Brown Bears (NAHL)	—
19	(United States)	Alex Jackstadt	Sophomore	F	5' 7" (1.7 m)	154 lb (70 kg)	1994-03-15	Anchorage, Alaska	Kenai River Brown Bears (NAHL)	—
20	(Canada)	Nathan Renouf	Sophomore	F	5' 8" (1.73 m)	154 lb (70 kg)	1994-05-11	Mississauga, Ontario	Quinnipiac (ECAC)	—
21	(Canada)	Tad Kozun	Junior	F	5' 11" (1.8 m)	170 lb (77 kg)	1993-03-03	Nipawin, Saskatchewan	Nipawin Hawks (SJHL)	—
22	(United States)	Conor Deal	Sophomore	F	5' 10" (1.78 m)	174 lb (79 kg)	1993-03-06	Anchorage, Alaska	Gustavus Adolphus (MIAC)	—
23	(Finland)	Tomi Hiekkavirta	Freshman	D	6' 0" (1.83 m)	182 lb (83 kg)	1996-04-05	Helsinki, Finland	HIFK U20 (Nuorten SM-liiga)	—
25	(Canada)	Jonah Renouf	Sophomore	F	5' 8" (1.73 m)	154 lb (70 kg)	1994-05-11	Mississauga, Ontario	Quinnipiac (ECAC)	—
26	(Canada)	Corey Renwick	Sophomore	F	6' 0" (1.83 m)	192 lb (87 kg)	1995-03-28	Nanoose Bay, British Columbia	Nanaimo Clippers (BCHL)	—
27	(United States)	Jeremiah Luedtke	Sophomore	F	5' 9" (1.75 m)	159 lb (72 kg)	1994-09-24	Seattle, Washington	Prince George Spruce Kings (BCHL)	—
28	(Canada)	Cam Amantea	Sophomore	F	5' 10" (1.78 m)	176 lb (80 kg)	1994-02-17	Calgary, Alberta	Penticton Vees (BCHL)	—
29	(Canada)	Sean MacTavish	Sophomore	F	6' 0" (1.83 m)	181 lb (82 kg)	1994-11-21	Edmonton, Alberta	Lincoln Stars (USHL)	—
31	(Finland)	Rasmus Reijola	Graduate	G	6' 3" (1.91 m)	205 lb (93 kg)	1992-11-26	Vantaa, Finland	St. Cloud State (NCHC)	—
33	(Canada)	Olivier Mantha (A)	Junior	G	6' 1" (1.85 m)	183 lb (83 kg)	1993-01-18	La Tuque, Quebec	Penticton Vees (BCHL)	—
37	(Germany)	David Trinkberger	Freshman	D	6' 5" (1.96 m)	209 lb (95 kg)	1996-08-25	Landshut, Germany	Sioux City Musketeers (USHL)	—
40	(Finland)	Aleksi Ainali	Freshman	F	5' 11" (1.8 m)	190 lb (86 kg)	1995-04-12	Vihti, Finland	Fairbanks Ice Dogs (NAHL)	—

== Standings ==
2016–17 Western Collegiate Hockey Association standings
	Conference record								Overall record					
	GP	W	L	T	SOW	PTS	GF	GA	GP	W	L	T	GF	GA
Bemidji State†	28	20	6	2	2	64	71	44	41	22	16	3	94	79
#19 Michigan Tech*	28	15	7	6	3	54	80	59	45	23	15	7	131	100
Minnesota State	28	15	9	4	2	51	89	68	39	22	13	4	119	95
Bowling Green	28	14	13	1	1	44	79	65	41	21	18	2	120	102
Ferris State	28	12	12	4	2	42	78	74	37	13	19	5	95	101
Alaska	28	11	13	4	3	40	67	84	36	12	20	4	79	113
Lake Superior State	28	8	13	7	4	35	78	87	36	11	18	7	103	119
Northern Michigan	28	10	15	3	1	34	69	75	39	13	22	4	93	108
Alabama–Huntsville	28	9	16	3	0	30	68	95	34	9	22	3	74	120
Alaska Anchorage	28	6	16	6	2	26	52	80	34	7	21	6	59	102
Championship: March 18, 2017 † indicates conference regular season champion (MacNaughton Cup); * indicates conference tournament champion (Broadmoor Trophy); Rankings: USCHO.com Top 20 Poll; updated March 6, 2017

== Schedule and results ==
Date	Time	Opponent^{#}	Rank^{#}	Site	TV	Decision	Result	Attendance	Record
Exhibition
September 30	7:16 PM	vs. Simon Fraser*		Sullivan Arena • Anchorage, Alaska (Exhibition)		Reijola	W 6–1	827	
Regular season
October 7	7:07 PM	at #13 Minnesota*		Sullivan Arena • Anchorage, Alaska		Mantha	L 1–1 ^{SOL}	2,953	0–1–0
October 8	7:07 PM	vs. Alaska*		Sullivan Arena • Anchorage, Alaska		Mantha	L 1–4	3,223	0–2–0
Brice Alaska Goal Rush
October 14	4:07 PM	vs. Omaha*		Carlson Center • Fairbanks, Alaska (Alaska Goal Rush semifinal)		Reijola	L 1–3	982	0–3–0
October 15	4:07 PM	vs. Canisius*		Carlson Center • Fairbanks, Alaska (Alaska Goal Rush consolation game)		Mantha	W 1–0	463	1–3–0
October 28	4:07 PM	at #20 Bemidji State		Sanford Center • Bemidji, Minnesota		Mantha	L 1–2 ^{OT}	2,306	1–4–0 (0–1–0)
October 29	4:07 PM	at #20 Bemidji State		Sanford Center • Bemidji, Minnesota		Mantha	L 0–4	2,564	1–5–0 (0–2–0)
November 4	7:09 PM	vs. Alabama–Huntsville		Sullivan Arena • Anchorage, Alaska		Reijola	L 2–5	2,128	1–6–0 (0–3–0)
November 5	7:07 PM	vs. Alabama–Huntsville		Sullivan Arena • Anchorage, Alaska		Mantha	L 2–3 ^{OT}	1,771	1–7–0 (0–4–0)
November 11	3:07 PM	at #12 Penn State*		Pegula Ice Arena • University Park, Pennsylvania		Mantha	L 3–6	5,999	1–8–0
November 12	3:07 PM	at #12 Penn State*		Pegula Ice Arena • University Park, Pennsylvania		Mantha	L 1–3	6,069	1–9–0
November 18	7:07 PM	vs. Michigan Tech		Sullivan Arena • Anchorage, Alaska		Mantha	L 2–3	2,089	1–10–0 (0–5–0)
November 19	7:07 PM	vs. Michigan Tech		Sullivan Arena • Anchorage, Alaska		Mantha	T 1–1 ^{SOW}	2,059	1–10–1 (0–5–1)
November 25	3:07 PM	at Bowling Green		Slater Family Ice Arena • Bowling Green, Ohio		Mantha	T 3–3 ^{3x3 OTL}	1,764	1–10–2 (0–5–2)
November 26	3:07 PM	at Bowling Green		Slater Family Ice Arena • Bowling Green, Ohio		Mantha	L 0–3	1,695	1–11–2 (0–6–2)
December 2	7:07 PM	vs. Northern Michigan		Sullivan Arena • Anchorage, Alaska		Mantha	W 5–3	612	2–11–2 (1–6–2)
December 3	7:07 PM	vs. Northern Michigan		Sullivan Arena • Anchorage, Alaska		Mantha	L 1–4	1,798	2–12–2 (1–7–2)
December 9	7:07 PM	at Alaska		Carlson Center • Fairbanks, Alaska (Governor's Cup)		Mantha	W 3–2	2,060	3–12–2 (2–7–2)
December 10	7:07 PM	at Alaska		Carlson Center • Fairbanks, Alaska (Governor's Cup)		Mantha	L 1–3	2,416	3–13–2 (2–8–2)
December 30	1:37 PM	vs. #15 Bemidji State		Sullivan Arena • Anchorage, Alaska		Mantha	W 4–1	1,429	4–13–2 (3–8–2)
December 31	1:37 PM	vs. #15 Bemidji State		Sullivan Arena • Anchorage, Alaska		Mantha	L 0–1	1,544	4–14–2 (3–9–2)
January 6	7:07 PM	vs. Ferris State		Sullivan Arena • Anchorage, Alaska		Mantha	W 4–1	1,712	5–14–2 (4–9–2)
January 7	7:10 PM	vs. Ferris State		Sullivan Arena • Anchorage, Alaska		Mantha	T 2–2 ^{SOL}	1,746	5–14–3 (4–9–3)
January 13	3:07 PM	at #20 Michigan Tech		MacInnes Student Ice Arena • Houghton, Michigan		Mantha	T 3–3 ^{3x3 OTW}	2,736	5–14–4 (4–9–4)
January 14	7:07 PM	at #20 Michigan Tech		MacInnes Student Ice Arena • Houghton, Michigan		Reijola	T 1–1 ^{SOL}	2,887	5–14–5 (4–9–5)
January 20	3:07 PM	at Northern Michigan		Berry Events Center • Marquette, Michigan		Mantha	L 1–6	1,650	5–15–5 (4–10–5)
January 21	3:07 PM	at Northern Michigan		Berry Events Center • Marquette, Michigan		Mantha	L 0–4	2,254	5–16–5 (4–11–5)
February 3	7:10 PM	at Minnesota State		Sullivan Arena • Anchorage, Alaska		Mantha	W 4–3	1,924	6–16–5 (5–11–5)
February 4	4:07 PM	at Minnesota State		Sullivan Arena • Anchorage, Alaska		Mantha	L 0–5	2,181	6–17–5 (5–12–5)
February 10	4:37 PM	at Lake Superior State		Taffy Abel Arena • Sault Ste. Marie, Michigan		Mantha	W 3–2	1,863	7–17–5 (6–12–5)
February 11	3:07 PM	at Lake Superior State		Taffy Abel Arena • Sault Ste. Marie, Michigan		Mantha	T 4–4 ^{3x3 OTL}	1,950	7–17–6 (6–12–6)
February 17	3:07 PM	at Ferris State		Ewigleben Arena • Big Rapids, Michigan		Mantha	L 1–2	2,045	7–18–6 (6–13–6)
February 18	3:07 PM	at Ferris State		Ewigleben Arena • Big Rapids, Michigan		Mantha	L 0–3	2,490	7–19–6 (6–14–6)
February 24	7:07 PM	vs. Alaska		Sullivan Arena • Anchorage, Alaska (Governor's Cup)		Mantha	L 3–4	2,736	7–20–6 (6–15–6)
February 25	7:07 PM	vs. Alaska		Sullivan Arena • Anchorage, Alaska (Governor's Cup)		Mantha	L 1–2 ^{OT}	3,055	7–21–6 (6–16–6)
*Non-conference game. ^{#}Rankings from USCHO.com Poll. All times are in Alaska Time. Source:

== Scoring statistics ==
Name	Position	Games	Goals	Assists	Points	PIM
Matt Anholt	LW	34	5	17	22	20
Tad Kozun	LW	32	5	14	19	8
Jarrett Brown	D	34	5	10	15	51
Mason Mitchell	LW	31	12	2	14	73
Jonah Renouf	LW	33	3	6	9	12
Chase Van Allen	D	34	3	6	9	18
Nathan Renouf	LW	24	1	8	9	18
Alex Jackstadt	F	30	4	4	8	29
Jeremiah Luedtke	F	27	2	6	8	20
Nicolas Erb Ekholm	C/RW	28	4	3	7	0
Tanner Johnson	D	31	3	3	6	16
Austin Azurdia	F	22	2	4	6	45
Nils Rygaard	C/RW	28	2	4	6	8
Brad Duwe	F	22	4	1	5	6
David Trinkberger	D	33	1	3	4	53
Aleksi Ainali	C	18	0	4	4	6
Dylan Hubbs	RW	22	0	4	4	60
Eric Roberts	D	28	1	2	3	32
Connor Wright	F	10	1	1	2	8
Cam Amantea	F	14	1	1	2	8
Nolan Nicholas	D	30	0	2	2	14
Tomi Hiekkavirta	D	16	0	1	1	4
Rasmus Reijola	G	6	0	0	0	0
Sean MacTavish	C	10	0	0	0	14
Corey Renwick	F	20	0	0	0	2
Olivier Mantha	G	30	0	0	0	2
Bench	-	-	-	-	-	26
Total			59	106	165	553

== Goaltending statistics ==
Name	Games	Minutes	Wins	Losses	Ties	Goals against	Saves	Shut outs	SV %	GAA
Rasmus Reijola	6	299	0	3	2	14	161	0	.920	2.80
Olivier Mantha	30	1764	7	18	4	83	867	1	.913	2.82
Empty Net	-	16	-	-	-	5	-	-	-	-
Total	34	2080	7	21	6	102	1028	1	.910	2.94

== Rankings ==
Poll	Week																									
Poll	Pre	1	2	3	4	5	6	7	8	9	10	11	12	13	14	15	16	17	18	19	20	21	22	23	24	25 (Final)
USCHO.com	NR	NR	NR	NR	NR	NR	NR	NR	NR	NR	NR	NR	NR	NR	NR	NR	NR	NR	NR	NR	NR	NR	NR	NR	-	NR
USA Today	NR	NR	NR	NR	NR	NR	NR	NR	NR	NR	NR	NR	NR	NR	NR	NR	NR	NR	NR	NR	NR	NR	NR	NR	NR	NR

USCHO did not release a poll in Week 24.
