= 2016–17 Alaska Nanooks men's ice hockey season =

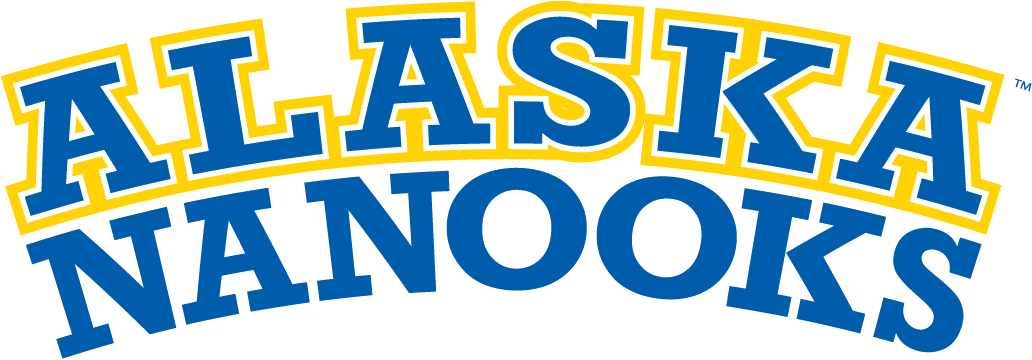
- Conference: 6th WCHA
- Home ice: Carlson Center

Rankings
- USCHO.com: NR
- USA Today: NR

Record
- Overall: 12–20–4
- Conference: 11–13–4
- Home: 5–10–1
- Road: 7–9–3
- Neutral: 0–1–0

Coaches and captains
- Head coach: Dallas Ferguson
- Assistant coaches: Erik Largen; Lance West; Ryan Reinheller
- Captain: Brandon Morley
- Alternate captain(s): Josh Erickson; Zach Frye; Tayler Munson; Justin Woods

The 2016–17 Alaska Nanooks men's ice hockey season was the 68th season of play for the program, the 33rd at the Division I level and the 4th in the WCHA conference. The Nanooks represented the University of Alaska Fairbanks and were coached by Dallas Ferguson, in his 9th season.

== Season ==
Alaska began the season poorly, losing four straight after opening with a win over Alaska Anchorage. The team rebounded with a win over #9 Minnesota State but could then only win two of their next eleven games. The Nanooks' offense was subpar during the first half of the season, scoring more than 3 goals in only four of their twenty games while averaging just over two and half goals per game. While the two goaltenders, Jenks and Jones, kept the team in most games, inconsistent play had led to Jenks supplanting the senior as the primary netminder in the first half of the year.

After a couple of bad outings around new year's, Jones was back in as the starter and didn't relinquish the job for the rest of the year. While the team's offense didn't get any better, the defense got stronger as they year went along and helped the team improve to 6th in the standings by the end of the season.

Entering the postseason, Alaska was hoping to continue giving Minnesota State fits, having defeated the Mavericks twice during the regular season. Unfortunately, the offense was absent from the series and the Nanooks were only able to record a single goal in two games.

== Departures ==
Player	Position	Nationality	Cause
Josh Atkinson	Defenseman	Canada	Graduation (signed with Atlanta Gladiators)
Jasen Fernsler	Defenseman	United States	Transferred to Ferris State
Alec Hajdukovich	Forward	United States	Graduation (signed with Alaska Aces)
Shawn Hochhausen	Forward	Canada	Left program (retired)
Nolan Huysmans	Forward	Canada	Graduation (signed with Huntsville Havoc)
John Keeney	Goaltender	United States	Graduation (retired)
Peter Krieger	Forward	United States	Transferred to Minnesota–Duluth
J. D. Peterson	Defenseman	United States	Graduation (retired)
Colton Sparrow	Forward	Canada	Transferred to Regina

== Recruiting ==
Player	Position	Nationality	Age	Notes
Tyler Cline	Forward	United States	21	Blaine, MN
Niko Della Maggiore	Goaltender	United States	21	Gilroy, CA
Aaron Herdt	Forward	United States	21	Moorhead, MN
Kylar Hope	Forward	Canada	21	Lashburn, SK
Danny Kiraly	Defenseman	United States	21	Glendale, AZ
James LaDouce	Defenseman	United States	21	Saginaw, MI
Colton Leiter	Forward/Defenseman	Canada	20	Edmonton, AB
Kyle Marino	Forward/Defenseman	Canada	21	Niagara Falls, ON
Anton Martinsson	Goaltender	Sweden	20	Klippan, SWE
Tristan Thompson	Defenseman	Canada	19	Canmore, AB
Troy Van Tetering	Forward	Canada	19	Carstairs, AB

== Roster ==
No.	Nat.	Player	Class	Pos	Height	Weight	DoB	Hometown	Previous team	NHL rights
1	(United States)	Niko Della Maggiore	Freshman	G	5' 10" (1.78 m)	201 lb (91 kg)	1995-04-01	Gilroy, California	Springfield Jr. Blues (NAHL)	—
2	(United States)	Jack Weiss	Sophomore	D	5' 11" (1.8 m)	185 lb (84 kg)	1994-05-30	Bloomington, Minnesota	Rio Grande Valley Killer Bees (NAHL)	—
5	(Canada)	Nikolas Koberstein	Sophomore	D	6' 2" (1.88 m)	185 lb (84 kg)	1996-01-19	Barrhead, Alberta	Bloomington Thunder (USHL)	MTL, 125th overall 2014
6	(United States)	Zach Frye (A)	Junior	D	6' 1" (1.85 m)	201 lb (91 kg)	1994-03-25	Spokane, Washington	Lincoln Stars (USHL)	—
7	(United States)	Josh Erickson (A)	Senior	F	5' 10" (1.78 m)	181 lb (82 kg)	1993-07-16	Roseau, Minnesota	Sioux City Musketeers (USHL)	—
8	(United States)	Justin Woods (A)	Junior (RS)	D	6' 2" (1.88 m)	212 lb (96 kg)	1994-02-12	Fairbanks, Alaska	Lincoln Stars (USHL)	—
9	(Canada)	Marcus Basara	Senior	F	6' 0" (1.83 m)	201 lb (91 kg)	1993-02-27	Vancouver, British Columbia	West Kelowna Warriors (BCHL)	—
10	(United States)	Danny Kiraly	Freshman	D	6' 1" (1.85 m)	192 lb (87 kg)	1995-08-03	Glendale, Arizona	Odessa Jackalopes (NAHL)	—
12	(United States)	Nick Hinz	Junior	D	5' 11" (1.8 m)	201 lb (91 kg)	1993-03-06	Oakdale, Minnesota	Fairbanks Ice Dogs (NAHL)	—
13	(United States)	Austin Vieth	Junior	F	5' 11" (1.8 m)	190 lb (86 kg)	1993-12-20	Marinette, Wisconsin	Waterloo Black Hawks (USHL)	—
14	(Canada)	Brandon Morley (C)	Senior	F	5' 9" (1.75 m)	183 lb (83 kg)	1994-04-17	Burnaby, British Columbia	Coquitlam Express (BCHL)	—
15	(Canada)	Troy Van Tetering	Freshman	F	5' 11" (1.8 m)	180 lb (82 kg)	1997-04-26	Carstairs, Alberta	Lloydminster Bobcats (AJHL)	—
16	(United States)	Tayler Munson (A)	Junior	F	6' 1" (1.85 m)	194 lb (88 kg)	1993-03-02	Fairbanks, Alaska	Fairbanks Ice Dogs (NAHL)	—
17	(United States)	Kyle Froese	Junior	D	6' 0" (1.83 m)	190 lb (86 kg)	1994-08-09	Traverse City, Michigan	Corpus Christi IceRays (NAHL)	—
18	(Canada)	John Mullally	Sophomore	F	5' 10" (1.78 m)	190 lb (86 kg)	1995-03-11	Timberlea, Nova Scotia	Whitecourt Wolverines (AJHL)	—
20	(Canada)	Kyle Marino	Freshman	F	6' 3" (1.91 m)	220 lb (100 kg)	1995-06-01	Niagara Falls, Ontario	West Kelowna Warriors (BCHL)	—
22	(United States)	Chad Staley	Sophomore	F	5' 9" (1.75 m)	181 lb (82 kg)	1994-06-29	Kennewick, Washington	Prince George Spruce Kings (BCHL)	—
23	(Canada)	Ryker Leer	Sophomore	F	5' 11" (1.8 m)	192 lb (87 kg)	1995-12-05	Red Deer, Alberta	Camrose Kodiaks (AJHL)	—
24	(United States)	James LaDouce	Freshman	F	5' 11" (1.8 m)	213 lb (97 kg)	1995-08-24	Saginaw, Michigan	Minot Minotauros (NAHL)	—
25	(United States)	Aaron Herdt	Freshman	F	5' 9" (1.75 m)	185 lb (84 kg)	1995-08-19	Moorhead, Minnesota	Bismarck Bobcats (NAHL)	—
26	(United States)	Tyler Cline	Freshman	F	5' 7" (1.7 m)	175 lb (79 kg)	1995-09-03	Blaine, Minnesota	Minnesota Wilderness (NAHL)	—
27	(Canada)	Colton Leiter	Freshman	F	6' 2" (1.88 m)	200 lb (91 kg)	1996-01-16	Edmonton, Alberta	Spruce Grove Saints (AJHL)	—
28	(Canada)	Kylar Hope	Freshman	F	5' 11" (1.8 m)	185 lb (84 kg)	1995-08-17	Lashburn, Saskatchewan	West Kelowna Warriors (BCHL)	—
29	(Canada)	Jesse Jenks	Sophomore	G	6' 3" (1.91 m)	194 lb (88 kg)	1995-01-24	Crofton, British Columbia	Prince George Spruce Kings (BCHL)	—
30	(Canada)	Davis Jones	Senior	G	6' 2" (1.88 m)	190 lb (86 kg)	1992-04-26	St. Albert, Alberta	Nipawin Hawks (SJHL)	—
32	(Canada)	Tristan Thompson	Freshman	D	5' 9" (1.75 m)	185 lb (84 kg)	1997-01-02	Canmore, Alberta	Brooks Bandits (AJHL)	—
33	(Sweden)	Anton Martinsson	Freshman	G	6' 1" (1.85 m)	178 lb (81 kg)	1995-12-11	Klippan, Sweden	Amarillo Bulls (NAHL)	—
37	(Canada)	Jordan Burns	Sophomore	D	6' 0" (1.83 m)	194 lb (88 kg)	1995-04-24	Vernon, British Columbia	Salmon Arm Silverbacks (BCHL)	—
39	(Canada)	Ross Heidt	Sophomore	F	5' 9" (1.75 m)	174 lb (79 kg)	1996-03-29	Red Deer, Alberta	Salmon Arm Silverbacks (BCHL)	—

== Standings ==
2016–17 Western Collegiate Hockey Association standings
	Conference record								Overall record					
	GP	W	L	T	SOW	PTS	GF	GA	GP	W	L	T	GF	GA
Bemidji State†	28	20	6	2	2	64	71	44	41	22	16	3	94	79
#19 Michigan Tech*	28	15	7	6	3	54	80	59	45	23	15	7	131	100
Minnesota State	28	15	9	4	2	51	89	68	39	22	13	4	119	95
Bowling Green	28	14	13	1	1	44	79	65	41	21	18	2	120	102
Ferris State	28	12	12	4	2	42	78	74	37	13	19	5	95	101
Alaska	28	11	13	4	3	40	67	84	36	12	20	4	79	113
Lake Superior State	28	8	13	7	4	35	78	87	36	11	18	7	103	119
Northern Michigan	28	10	15	3	1	34	69	75	39	13	22	4	93	108
Alabama–Huntsville	28	9	16	3	0	30	68	95	34	9	22	3	74	120
Alaska Anchorage	28	6	16	6	2	26	52	80	34	7	21	6	59	102
Championship: March 18, 2017 † indicates conference regular season champion (MacNaughton Cup); * indicates conference tournament champion (Broadmoor Trophy); Rankings: USCHO.com Top 20 Poll; updated March 6, 2017

== Schedule and results ==
Date	Time	Opponent^{#}	Rank^{#}	Site	TV	Decision	Result	Attendance	Record
Exhibition
October 2	3:07 PM	vs. Simon Fraser*		Carlson Center • Fairbanks, Alaska		Jenks	W 2–0	1,775	
Regular season
October 8	7:07 PM	at Alaska Anchorage*		Sullivan Arena • Anchorage, Alaska		Jones	W 4–1	3,223	1–0–0
October 9	4:07 PM	vs. #13 Minnesota*		Sullivan Arena • Anchorage, Alaska		Jenks	L 3–6	1,682	1–1–0
Brice Alaska Goal Rush
October 14	7:17 PM	vs. Canisius*		Carlson Center • Fairbanks, Alaska (Alaska Goal Rush semifinal)		Jenks	L 1–2 ^{OT}	2,263	1–2–0
October 15	7:07 PM	vs. Omaha*		Carlson Center • Fairbanks, Alaska (Alaska Goal Rush consolation game)		Jones	L 3–4 ^{OT}	2,408	1–3–0
October 21	7:07 PM	vs. #9 Minnesota State		Carlson Center • Fairbanks, Alaska		Jones	L 1–7	957	1–4–0 (0–1–0)
October 22	7:07 PM	vs. #9 Minnesota State		Carlson Center • Fairbanks, Alaska		Jenks	W 4–2	958	2–4–0 (1–1–0)
October 28	3:37 PM	at Lake Superior State		Taffy Abel Arena • Sault Ste. Marie, Michigan		Jenks	L 2–3	2,446	2–5–0 (1–2–0)
October 29	3:07 PM	at Lake Superior State		Taffy Abel Arena • Sault Ste. Marie, Michigan		Jenks	W 4–3 ^{OT}	3,138	3–5–0 (2–2–0)
November 4	7:07 PM	vs. #18 Bemidji State		Carlson Center • Fairbanks, Alaska		Jenks	L 2–6	2,155	3–6–0 (2–3–0)
November 5	7:07 PM	vs. #18 Bemidji State		Carlson Center • Fairbanks, Alaska		Jones	L 1–3	2,530	3–7–0 (2–4–0)
November 11	4:07 PM	at Alabama–Huntsville		Von Braun Center • Huntsville, Alabama		Jenks	T 3–3 ^{3x3 OTW}	2,530	3–7–1 (2–4–1)
November 12	4:07 PM	at Alabama–Huntsville		Von Braun Center • Huntsville, Alabama		Jenks	W 3–1	2,103	4–7–1 (3–4–1)
November 25	7:07 PM	vs. Michigan Tech		Carlson Center • Fairbanks, Alaska		Jenks	L 1–4	1,966	4–8–1 (3–5–1)
November 26	7:07 PM	vs. Michigan Tech		Carlson Center • Fairbanks, Alaska		Jenks	L 1–2	2,027	4–9–1 (3–6–1)
December 2	4:07 PM	at #15 Minnesota State		Verizon Wireless Center • Mankato, Minnesota		Jenks	L 3–7	3,675	4–10–1 (3–7–1)
December 3	4:07 PM	at #15 Minnesota State		Verizon Wireless Center • Mankato, Minnesota		Jones	T 5–5 ^{SOW}	3,932	4–10–2 (3–7–2)
December 9	7:07 PM	vs. Alaska Anchorage		Carlson Center • Fairbanks, Alaska (Governor's Cup)		Jones	L 2–3	2,060	4–11–2 (3–8–2)
December 10	7:07 PM	vs. Alaska Anchorage		Carlson Center • Fairbanks, Alaska (Governor's Cup)		Jenks	W 3–1	2,416	5–11–2 (4–8–2)
December 16	7:07 PM	vs. Bowling Green		Carlson Center • Fairbanks, Alaska		Jenks	W 3–2	1,903	6–11–2 (5–8–2)
December 17	7:07 PM	vs. Bowling Green		Carlson Center • Fairbanks, Alaska		Jenks	L 3–6	1,976	6–12–2 (5–9–2)
December 31	12:05 PM	at #12 Notre Dame*		Compton Family Ice Arena • Notre Dame, Indiana		Jones	L 0–5	4,149	6–13–2
January 1	10:05 AM	at #12 Notre Dame*		Compton Family Ice Arena • Notre Dame, Indiana		Jenks	L 0–4	4,023	6–14–2
January 13	3:07 PM	at Ferris State		Ewigleben Arena • Big Rapids, Michigan		Jones	T 3–3 ^{3x3 OTW}	1,782	6–14–3 (5–9–3)
January 14	3:07 PM	at Ferris State		Ewigleben Arena • Big Rapids, Michigan		Jones	W 2–1 ^{OT}	2,039	7–14–3 (6–9–3)
January 20	3:07 PM	at Bowling Green		Slater Family Ice Arena • Bowling Green, Ohio		Jones	W 3–2	2,713	8–14–3 (7–9–3)
January 21	3:07 PM	at Bowling Green		Slater Family Ice Arena • Bowling Green, Ohio		Jones	L 1–2 ^{OT}	2,921	8–15–3 (7–10–3)
February 3	7:07 PM	vs. Alabama–Huntsville		Carlson Center • Fairbanks, Alaska		Jones	W 3–0	2,187	9–15–3 (8–10–3)
February 4	7:07 PM	vs. Alabama–Huntsville		Carlson Center • Fairbanks, Alaska		Jones	L 1–4	2,234	9–16–3 (8–11–3)
February 10	3:07 PM	at Northern Michigan		Berry Events Center • Marquette, Michigan		Jones	L 0–3	1,705	9–17–3 (8–12–3)
February 11	3:07 PM	at Northern Michigan		Berry Events Center • Marquette, Michigan		Jones	L 0–2	1,775	9–18–3 (8–13–3)
February 17	7:07 PM	vs. Lake Superior State		Carlson Center • Fairbanks, Alaska		Jones	W 4–2	1,902	10–18–3 (9–13–3)
February 18	7:07 PM	vs. Lake Superior State		Carlson Center • Fairbanks, Alaska		Jones	T 3–3 ^{3x3 OTL}	2,693	10–18–4 (9–13–4)
February 24	7:07 PM	at Alaska Anchorage		Sullivan Arena • Anchorage, Alaska (Governor's Cup)		Jenks	W 4–3	2,726	11–18–4 (10–13–4)
February 25	7:07 PM	at Alaska Anchorage		Sullivan Arena • Anchorage, Alaska (Governor's Cup)		Jones	W 2–1 ^{OT}	3,055	12–18–4 (11–13–4)
WCHA Tournament
March 3	4:07 PM	at Minnesota State*		Verizon Wireless Center • Mankato, Minnesota (WCHA Quarterfinals game 1)		Jones	L 0–3	2,887	12–19–4
March 4	4:07 PM	at Minnesota State*		Verizon Wireless Center • Mankato, Minnesota (WCHA Quarterfinals game 2)		Jones	L 1–4	2,984	12–19–4
Alaska Lost Series 0–2
*Non-conference game. ^{#}Rankings from USCHO.com Poll. All times are in Alaska Time. Source:

== Scoring statistics ==
Name	Position	Games	Goals	Assists	Points	PIM
Chad Staley	C	36	8	13	21	21
Zach Frye	D	36	5	15	20	79
Marcus Basara	RW	33	9	10	19	39
Troy Van Tetering	LW	36	8	6	14	6
Tyler Cline	C/LW	35	4	10	14	12
Tayler Munson	C/RW	28	4	8	12	24
Justin Woods	D	30	3	9	12	35
Brandon Morley	LW	34	2	10	12	18
Colton Leiter	C/D	35	7	4	11	29
John Mullally	LW	35	4	6	10	38
Ross Heidt	RW	32	7	2	9	38
Josh Erickson	LW	31	4	4	8	97
Danny Kiraly	D	24	2	6	8	14
Ryler Leer	LW	27	3	3	6	12
Nikolas Koberstein	D	31	2	4	6	33
Tristan Thompson	D	31	2	4	6	16
Nick Hinz	D	25	0	6	6	8
Austin Vieth	C/LW	27	3	2	5	54
Jack Weiss	D	14	0	3	3	22
James LaDouce	D	25	2	0	2	23
Kylar Hope	F	30	0	2	2	21
Aaron Herdt	C/LW	12	0	1	1	2
Jordan Burns	D	1	0	0	0	2
Niko Della Maggiore	G	1	0	0	0	15
Jesse Jenks	G	17	0	0	0	4
Davis Jones	G	20	0	0	0	0
Bench	-	-	-	-	-	8
Total			79	128	207	670

== Goaltending statistics ==
Name	Games	Minutes	Wins	Losses	Ties	Goals against	Saves	Shut outs	SV %	GAA
Davis Jones	20	1190	6	11	3	54	562	1	.912	2.72
Jesse Jenks	17	992	6	9	1	55	436	0	.888	3.33
Empty Net	-	11	-	-	-	4	-	-	-	-
Total	36	2194	12	20	4	113	998	1	.898	3.09

== Rankings ==
Poll	Week																									
Poll	Pre	1	2	3	4	5	6	7	8	9	10	11	12	13	14	15	16	17	18	19	20	21	22	23	24	25 (Final)
USCHO.com	NR	NR	NR	NR	NR	NR	NR	NR	NR	NR	NR	NR	NR	NR	NR	NR	NR	NR	NR	NR	NR	NR	NR	NR	-	NR
USA Today	NR	NR	NR	NR	NR	NR	NR	NR	NR	NR	NR	NR	NR	NR	NR	NR	NR	NR	NR	NR	NR	NR	NR	NR	NR	NR

USCHO did not release a poll in Week 24.
