= Lance West =

Canadian ice hockey player and coach

Biographical details
- Born: September 20, 1970 (age 56); Penticton, British Columbia, Canada

Playing career
- 1991–1995: Alabama–Huntsville
- Position: Centre

Coaching career (HC unless noted)
- 1995–1998: Alabama–Huntsville (GA)
- 2000–2007: Alabama–Huntsville (asst.)
- 2007–2017: Alaska (asst.)
- 2017–2018: Alaska
- 2018–2020: Alabama–Huntsville (asst.)
- 2020–2021: Alabama–Huntsville

Head coaching record
- Overall: 14–40–4 (.276)

Lance West (born September 20, 1970) is a Canadian ice hockey coach.

== Early life and playing career ==
West was born in Penticton, British Columbia, and began his hockey career in the British Columbia Junior Hockey League. He played for the Vernon Lakers in 1988–89, winning the BCHL playoff and the Abbott Cup, and the Kelowna Spartans from 1989 to 1991. From 1991 through 1995, West played college ice hockey for the University of Alabama–Huntsville Chargers. While at UAH, West played in the 1994 Division II national championship, and was the team captain in his senior year.

== Coaching career ==
After graduating, West took a position as a graduate assistant at UAH under head coach Doug Ross until 1998. During that time, the Chargers won two Division II national championships in 1996 and 1998. West returned to UAH as a full assistant in 2000, serving until 2007 when Ross retired.

West moved to Alaska–Fairbanks in 2007 as a volunteer assistant, video coordinator, and manager of the student recreation center. He was promoted to full assistant coach in 2008, and was named interim head coach for the 2017–18 season after the resignation of Dallas Ferguson. After an 11–22–3 season as Alaska's head coach, the Nanooks named Erik Largen as permanent head coach, and West returned to Alabama–Huntsville for the 2018–19 season as an assistant under Mike Corbett. After Corbett's departure following the 2019–20 season, West was promoted to head coach on July 22, 2020. In May 2021, UAH's hockey program was indefinitely suspended due to funding issues and lack of conference membership.

== Head coaching record ==
Record table
Season	Team	Overall	Conference	Standing	Postseason
Alaska Nanooks (WCHA) (2017–2018)
2017–18	Alaska	11–22–3	9–17–2	8th	WCHA Quarterfinals
Alaska:		11–22–3	9–17–2		
Alabama-Huntsville Chargers (WCHA) (2020–2021)
2020–21	Alabama–Huntsville	3–18–1	3–11–0	7th	WCHA Quarterfinals
Alabama–Huntsville:		3–18–1	3–11–0		
Total:		14–40–4			
National champion Postseason invitational champion Conference regular season champion Conference regular season and conference tournament champion Division regular season champion Division regular season and conference tournament champion Conference tournament champion
