= 2017–18 Alaska Nanooks men's ice hockey season =

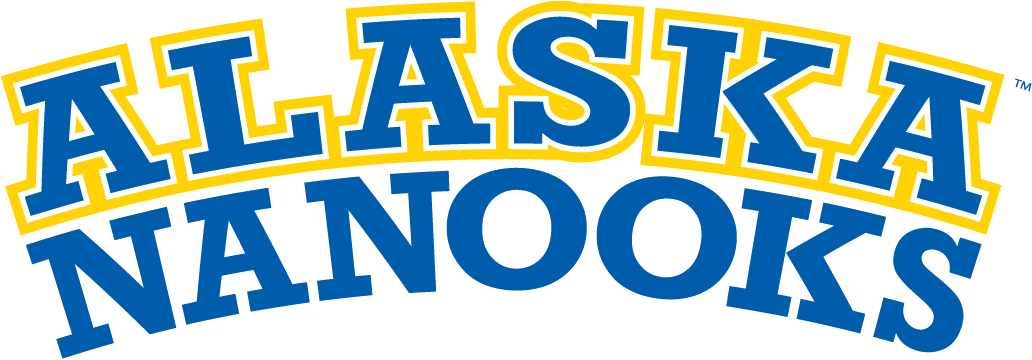
- Conference: 8th WCHA
- Home ice: Carlson Center

Rankings
- USCHO.com: NR
- USA Today: NR

Record
- Overall: 11–22–3
- Conference: 9–17–2
- Home: 7–9–1
- Road: 4–13–2

Coaches and captains
- Head coach: Lance West
- Assistant coaches: Erik Largen; Lincoln Nguyen; Mike Parnell; Ryan Reinheller
- Captain: Justin Woods
- Alternate captain(s): Zach Frye; Tayler Munson

The 2017–18 Alaska Nanooks men's ice hockey season was the 69th season of play for the program, the 34th at the Division I level and the 5th in the WCHA conference. The Nanooks represented the University of Alaska Fairbanks and were coached by Lance West, in his 1st season.

== Season ==
After the resignation of Dallas Ferguson, long-time assistant coach Lance West was promoted to interim head coach while the school decided who would lead the program.

The team got off to a bit of a slow start, going winless in its first four games. A sweep of arch-rival Alaska Anchorage got the team on the winning side of the ledger entering conference play, however, the Nanooks weren't able to get many wins afterwards. After notching one victory in their next seven matches, the team started showing some jam when they took down #20 Northern Michigan, 4–1. After a second sweep of the Seawolves, Alaska looked to be well positioned when they split with #8 Minnesota State in mid-January, however, goaltending became a problem afterwards. Neither regular starter Anton Martinsson nor backup Niko Della Maggiore were able to keep the puck out of the net on several occasions. Unfortunately, even when they were, the offense usually failed to do much. Alaska went 2–9–1 in their last 11 games and, other than their sweep of Ferris State, Alaska wasn't able to muster much in the way of scoring. To make matters worse, they faced Alaska Anchorage in the regular season finale and were swept at home. The two wins for the Seawolves were half of their total for the year and seemed to take the fight out of the Nanooks.

Alaska just held onto the 8th and final spot for the WCHA Tournament and the team's reward was to face Minnesota State, who had now risen to #3 in the polls. Alaska was trounced in the two games, getting outshot 45–78 and outscored 4–14. After the team's melt-down in the later part of the season, Alaska decided not to retain Lance West and instead turned the team over to his assistant, Erik Largen.

== Departures ==
Player	Position	Nationality	Cause
Marcus Basara	Forward	Canada	Graduation (signed with Orlando Solar Bears)
Jordan Burns	Defenseman	Canada	Transferred to Regina
Josh Erickson	Forward	United States	Graduation (signed with Knoxville Ice Bears)
Jesse Jenks	Goaltender	Canada	Left program (retired)
Davis Jones	Goaltender	Canada	Graduation (signed with Alaska Aces)
Brandon Morley	Forward	Canada	Graduation (signed with TSV Peißenberg)
John Mullally	Forward	Canada	Transferred to Saint Mary's

== Recruiting ==
Player	Position	Nationality	Age	Notes
Brennan Blaszczak	Forward	United States	21	Las Vegas, NV
Steven Jandric	Forward	Canada	20	Prince George, BC
Max Newton	Forward	Canada	19	Vancouver, BC
Tony Rehm	Goaltender	United States	20	Madison, WI
Justin Young	Forward	Canada	19	Leduc, AB

== Roster ==
No.	Nat.	Player	Class	Pos	Height	Weight	DoB	Hometown	Previous team	NHL rights
1	(United States)	Niko Della Maggiore	Sophomore	G	5' 10" (1.78 m)	201 lb (91 kg)	1995-04-01	Gilroy, California	Springfield Jr. Blues (NAHL)	—
2	(United States)	Jack Weiss	Junior	D	5' 11" (1.8 m)	185 lb (84 kg)	1994-05-30	Bloomington, Minnesota	Rio Grande Valley Killer Bees (NAHL)	—
5	(Canada)	Nikolas Koberstein	Junior	D	6' 2" (1.88 m)	185 lb (84 kg)	1996-01-19	Barrhead, Alberta	Bloomington Thunder (USHL)	MTL, 125th overall 2014
6	(United States)	Zach Frye (A)	Senior	D	6' 1" (1.85 m)	201 lb (91 kg)	1994-03-25	Spokane, Washington	Lincoln Stars (USHL)	—
8	(United States)	Justin Woods (C)	Senior (RS)	D	6' 2" (1.88 m)	212 lb (96 kg)	1994-02-12	Fairbanks, Alaska	Lincoln Stars (USHL)	—
9	(Canada)	Justin Young	Freshman	F	6' 0" (1.83 m)	184 lb (83 kg)	1997-12-23	Leduc, Alberta	Whitecourt Wolverines (AJHL)	—
10	(United States)	Danny Kiraly	Sophomore	D	6' 1" (1.85 m)	192 lb (87 kg)	1995-08-03	Glendale, Arizona	Odessa Jackalopes (NAHL)	—
11	(United States)	Steven Jandric	Freshman	F	6' 0" (1.83 m)	200 lb (91 kg)	1997-08-18	Prince George, British Columbia	Vernon Vipers (BCHL)	—
12	(United States)	Nick Hinz	Senior	D	5' 11" (1.8 m)	201 lb (91 kg)	1993-03-06	Oakdale, Minnesota	Fairbanks Ice Dogs (NAHL)	—
13	(United States)	Austin Vieth	Senior	F	5' 11" (1.8 m)	190 lb (86 kg)	1993-12-20	Marinette, Wisconsin	Waterloo Black Hawks (USHL)	—
14	(United States)	Brennan Blaszczak	Freshman	F	6' 0" (1.83 m)	180 lb (82 kg)	1996-03-12	Troy, Michigan	Springfield Jr. Blues (NAHL)	—
15	(Canada)	Troy Van Tetering	Sophomore	F	5' 11" (1.8 m)	180 lb (82 kg)	1997-04-26	Carstairs, Alberta	Lloydminster Bobcats (AJHL)	—
16	(United States)	Tayler Munson (A)	Senior	F	6' 1" (1.85 m)	194 lb (88 kg)	1993-03-02	Fairbanks, Alaska	Fairbanks Ice Dogs (NAHL)	—
17	(United States)	Kyle Froese	Junior (RS)	D	6' 0" (1.83 m)	190 lb (86 kg)	1994-08-09	Traverse City, Michigan	Corpus Christi IceRays (NAHL)	—
20	(Canada)	Max Newton	Freshman	F	5' 10" (1.78 m)	185 lb (84 kg)	1997-11-14	Vancouver, British Columbia	Cowichan Valley Capitals (BCHL)	—
22	(United States)	Chad Staley	Junior	F	5' 9" (1.75 m)	181 lb (82 kg)	1994-06-29	Kennewick, Washington	Prince George Spruce Kings (BCHL)	—
23	(Canada)	Ryker Leer	Junior	F	5' 11" (1.8 m)	192 lb (87 kg)	1995-12-05	Red Deer, Alberta	Camrose Kodiaks (AJHL)	—
24	(United States)	James LaDouce	Sophomore	F	5' 11" (1.8 m)	213 lb (97 kg)	1995-08-24	Saginaw, Michigan	Minot Minotauros (NAHL)	—
25	(United States)	Aaron Herdt	Sophomore	F	5' 9" (1.75 m)	185 lb (84 kg)	1995-08-19	Moorhead, Minnesota	Bismarck Bobcats (NAHL)	—
26	(United States)	Tyler Cline	Sophomore	F	5' 7" (1.7 m)	175 lb (79 kg)	1995-09-03	Blaine, Minnesota	Minnesota Wilderness (NAHL)	—
27	(Canada)	Colton Leiter	Sophomore	F	6' 2" (1.88 m)	200 lb (91 kg)	1996-01-16	Edmonton, Alberta	Spruce Grove Saints (AJHL)	—
28	(Canada)	Kylar Hope	Sophomore	F	5' 11" (1.8 m)	185 lb (84 kg)	1995-08-17	Lashburn, Saskatchewan	West Kelowna Warriors (BCHL)	—
32	(Canada)	Tristan Thompson	Sophomore	D	5' 9" (1.75 m)	185 lb (84 kg)	1997-01-02	Canmore, Alberta	Brooks Bandits (AJHL)	—
33	(Sweden)	Anton Martinsson	Sophomore	G	6' 1" (1.85 m)	178 lb (81 kg)	1995-12-11	Klippan, Sweden	Amarillo Bulls (NAHL)	—
35	(United States)	Tony Rehm	Freshman	G	6' 1" (1.85 m)	185 lb (84 kg)	1997-06-29	Madison, Wisconsin	Victoria Grizzlies (BCHL)	—
36	(Canada)	Kyle Marino	Sophomore	F	6' 3" (1.91 m)	220 lb (100 kg)	1995-06-01	Niagara Falls, Ontario	West Kelowna Warriors (BCHL)	—
39	(Canada)	Ross Heidt	Sophomore	F	5' 9" (1.75 m)	174 lb (79 kg)	1996-03-29	Red Deer, Alberta	Salmon Arm Silverbacks (BCHL)	—

== Standings ==
2017–18 Western Collegiate Hockey Association standings
	Conference record								Overall record					
	GP	W	L	T	SOW	PTS	GF	GA	GP	W	L	T	GF	GA
#9 Minnesota State†	28	22	5	1	0	67	116	58	40	29	10	1	153	84
#20 Northern Michigan	28	19	7	2	2	61	85	64	43	25	15	3	130	108
Bowling Green	28	17	6	5	2	58	87	63	41	23	12	6	122	100
Bemidji State	28	13	9	6	4	49	77	63	38	16	14	8	103	95
#16 Michigan Tech*	28	12	11	5	2	43	82	75	44	22	17	5	134	117
Ferris State	28	11	16	1	0	34	68	86	38	14	23	1	87	122
Alabama–Huntsville	28	10	16	2	1	33	69	86	37	12	23	2	84	121
Alaska	28	9	17	2	1	30	74	85	36	11	22	3	97	118
Lake Superior State	28	8	17	3	0	27	59	90	36	10	22	4	76	121
Alaska Anchorage	28	4	21	3	3	18	55	102	34	4	26	4	65	124
Championship: March 17, 2018 † indicates conference regular season champion (MacNaughton Cup) * indicates conference tournament champion (Broadmoor Trophy); Rankings: USCHO.com Top 20 Poll; updated March 5, 2018

== Schedule and results ==
Date	Time	Opponent^{#}	Rank^{#}	Site	TV	Decision	Result	Attendance	Record
Exhibition
September 29	7:07 PM	vs. Simon Fraser*		Carlson Center • Fairbanks, Alaska		Martinsson	W 6–0	1,023	
Regular season
October 6	7:07 PM	vs. #17 Air Force*		Carlson Center • Fairbanks, Alaska		Martinsson	L 2–3	1,195	0–1–0
October 7	7:07 PM	vs. #17 Air Force*		Carlson Center • Fairbanks, Alaska		Martinsson	T 1–1 ^{3x3 OTW}	2,649	0–1–1
October 13	4:37 PM	at #6 St. Cloud State*		Herb Brooks National Hockey Center • St. Cloud, Minnesota		Martinsson	L 3–6	3,628	0–2–1
October 14	4:07 PM	at #6 St. Cloud State*		Herb Brooks National Hockey Center • St. Cloud, Minnesota	FSN+	Martinsson	L 4–5 ^{OT}	4,048	0–3–1
October 20	7:07 PM	at Alaska Anchorage*		Sullivan Arena • Anchorage, Alaska (Governor's Cup)		Martinsson	W 6–2	2,846	1–3–1
October 21	7:07 PM	vs. Alaska Anchorage*		Carlson Center • Fairbanks, Alaska (Governor's Cup)		Martinsson	W 3–2	3,128	2–3–1
October 27	3:37 PM	at Bowling Green		Slater Family Ice Arena • Bowling Green, Ohio		Martinsson	L 1–2	1,910	2–4–1 (0–1–0)
October 28	3:07 PM	at Bowling Green		Slater Family Ice Arena • Bowling Green, Ohio		Martinsson	T 2–2 ^{SOW}	1,922	2–4–2 (0–1–1)
November 3	7:07 PM	vs. Bemidji State		Carlson Center • Fairbanks, Alaska		Martinsson	W 4–3 ^{OT}	2,860	3–4–2 (1–1–1)
November 4	7:00 PM	vs. Bemidji State		Carlson Center • Fairbanks, Alaska		Martinsson	L 2–3	2,134	3–5–2 (1–2–1)
November 10	3:07 PM	at Ferris State		Ewigleben Arena • Big Rapids, Michigan		Martinsson	L 1–3	1,548	3–6–2 (1–3–1)
November 11	3:07 PM	at Ferris State		Ewigleben Arena • Big Rapids, Michigan		Martinsson	L 3–5	1,797	3–7–2 (1–4–1)
November 17	7:07 PM	at #20 Northern Michigan		Carlson Center • Fairbanks, Alaska		Martinsson	L 3–5	2,133	3–8–2 (1–5–1)
November 18	7:07 PM	at #20 Northern Michigan		Carlson Center • Fairbanks, Alaska		Della Maggiore	W 4–1	2,336	4–8–2 (2–5–1)
November 24	7:07 PM	vs. Michigan Tech		Carlson Center • Fairbanks, Alaska		Della Maggiore	L 4–5 ^{OT}	1,866	4–9–2 (2–6–1)
November 25	7:07 PM	vs. Michigan Tech		Carlson Center • Fairbanks, Alaska		Martinsson	L 1–5	2,251	4–10–2 (2–7–1)
December 1	3:07 PM	at Lake Superior State		Taffy Abel Arena • Sault Ste. Marie, Michigan		Martinsson	W 5–3	1,556	5–10–2 (3–7–1)
December 2	3:07 PM	at Lake Superior State		Taffy Abel Arena • Sault Ste. Marie, Michigan		Martinsson	L 1–4	1,526	5–11–2 (3–8–1)
December 8	7:11 PM	at Alaska Anchorage		Sullivan Arena • Anchorage, Alaska (Governor's Cup)		Martinsson	W 7–2	2,298	6–11–2 (4–8–1)
December 9	7:10 PM	at Alaska Anchorage		Sullivan Arena • Anchorage, Alaska (Governor's Cup)		Martinsson	W 3–2	2,264	7–11–2 (5–8–1)
January 5	7:07 PM	vs. Alabama–Huntsville		Carlson Center • Fairbanks, Alaska		Martinsson	W 3–2	2,478	8–11–2 (6–8–1)
January 6	7:07 PM	vs. Alabama–Huntsville		Carlson Center • Fairbanks, Alaska		Martinsson	L 1–3	2,694	8–12–2 (6–9–1)
January 12	7:07 PM	vs. #8 Minnesota State		Carlson Center • Fairbanks, Alaska		Martinsson	W 5–0	1,988	9–12–2 (7–9–1)
January 13	7:07 PM	vs. #8 Minnesota State		Carlson Center • Fairbanks, Alaska		Martinsson	L 1–5	2,319	9–13–2 (7–10–1)
January 19	3:07 PM	at Michigan Tech		MacInnes Student Ice Arena • Houghton, Michigan		Martinsson	L 2–5	3,781	9–14–2 (7–11–1)
January 20	3:07 PM	at Michigan Tech		MacInnes Student Ice Arena • Houghton, Michigan		Della Maggiore	L 3–4	3,365	9–15–2 (7–12–1)
February 2	7:07 PM	vs. Ferris State		Carlson Center • Fairbanks, Alaska		Martinsson	W 4–2	2,232	10–15–2 (8–12–1)
February 3	7:07 PM	vs. Ferris State		Carlson Center • Fairbanks, Alaska		Martinsson	W 4–1	2,472	11–15–2 (9–12–1)
February 9	3:00 PM	at #20 Northern Michigan		Berry Events Center • Marquette, Michigan		Martinsson	L 1–2 ^{OT}	1,982	11–16–2 (9–13–1)
February 10	3:00 PM	at #20 Northern Michigan		Berry Events Center • Marquette, Michigan		Martinsson	L 1–4	2,598	11–17–2 (9–14–1)
February 15	4:07 PM	at Bemidji State		Sanford Center • Bemidji, Minnesota		Martinsson	T 2–2 ^{3x3 OTL}	2,303	11–17–3 (9–14–2)
February 16	4:07 PM	at Bemidji State		Sanford Center • Bemidji, Minnesota		Martinsson	L 1–2	3,098	11–18–3 (9–15–2)
February 23	7:07 PM	vs. Alaska Anchorage		Carlson Center • Fairbanks, Alaska (Governor's Cup)		Martinsson	L 3–5	2,696	11–19–3 (9–16–2)
February 24	7:07 PM	vs. Alaska Anchorage		Carlson Center • Fairbanks, Alaska (Governor's Cup)		Della Maggiore	L 2–3	2,876	11–20–3 (9–17–2)
WCHA Tournament
March 2	4:07 PM	at #3 Minnesota State*		Verizon Wireless Center • Mankato, Minnesota (WCHA Quarterfinals game 1)		Martinsson	L 2–8	2,941	11–21–3
March 3	4:07 PM	at #3 Minnesota State*		Verizon Wireless Center • Mankato, Minnesota (WCHA Quarterfinals game 2)		Della Maggiore	L 2–6	2,876	11–22–3
Alaska Lost Series 0–2
*Non-conference game. ^{#}Rankings from USCHO.com Poll. All times are in Alaska Time. Source:

== Scoring statistics ==
Name	Position	Games	Goals	Assists	Points	PIM
Zach Frye	D	35	11	23	34	100
Steven Jandric	LW	36	4	19	23	39
Colton Leiter	C/D	31	9	11	20	45
Justin Woods	D	36	9	11	20	20
Kyler Hope	F	34	8	12	20	34
Troy Van Tetering	LW	36	7	11	18	6
Chad Staley	C	36	4	14	18	20
Tayler Munson	C/RW	32	8	6	14	26
Tyler Cline	C/LW	27	8	4	12	33
Nikolas Koberstein	D	36	1	11	12	42
Tristan Thompson	D	35	5	6	11	18
Ross Heidt	RW	34	7	3	10	6
Ryker Leer	LW	34	6	3	9	14
James LaDouce	D	27	2	6	8	22
Kyle Marino	C/D	31	2	5	7	58
Justin Young	C	32	2	5	7	12
Nick Hinz	D	30	0	7	7	8
Max Newton	F	25	1	4	5	38
Austin Vieth	C/LW	28	2	2	4	26
Jack Weiss	D	24	1	0	1	21
Brennan Blaszczak	F	2	0	1	1	0
Danny Kiraly	D	10	0	1	1	2
Aaron Herdt	C/LW	14	0	1	1	12
Anton Martinsson	G	32	0	1	1	2
Kyle Froese	D	3	0	0	0	0
Niko Della Maggiore	G	10	0	0	0	0
Bench	-	-	-	-	-	6
Total			97	167	264	610

== Goaltending statistics ==
Name	Games	Minutes	Wins	Losses	Ties	Goals against	Saves	Shut outs	SV %	GAA
Niko Della Maggiore	10	437	1	4	0	21	207	0	.899	2.88
Anton Martinsson	32	1721	10	18	3	91	727	1	.889	3.17
Empty Net	-	24	-	-	-	6	-	-	-	-
Total	36	2183	11	22	3	118	913	1	.886	3.24

== Rankings ==
Poll	Week																									
Poll	Pre	1	2	3	4	5	6	7	8	9	10	11	12	13	14	15	16	17	18	19	20	21	22	23	24	25 (Final)
USCHO.com	NR	NR	NR	NR	NR	NR	NR	NR	NR	NR	NR	NR	NR	NR	NR	NR	NR	NR	NR	NR	NR	NR	NR	NR	-	NR
USA Today	NR	NR	NR	NR	NR	NR	NR	NR	NR	NR	NR	NR	NR	NR	NR	NR	NR	NR	NR	NR	NR	NR	NR	NR	NR	NR

USCHO did not release a poll in Week 24.

== Awards and honors ==
Player	Award	Ref
Zach Frye	All-WCHA First Team	
Steven Jandric	WCHA All-Rookie Team	
