= 2020–21 Alabama–Huntsville Chargers men's ice hockey season =

- Conference: 7th WCHA
- Home ice: Von Braun Center

Rankings
- USCHO: NR
- USA Today: NR

Record
- Overall: 3–18–1
- Conference: 3–11–0
- Home: 2–5–0
- Road: 1–13–1
- Neutral: 0–0–0

Coaches and captains
- Head coach: Lance West
- Assistant coaches: Karlis Zirnis; Carmine Guerriero

The 2020–21 Alabama–Huntsville Chargers men's ice hockey season was the 36th season of play for the program, the 28th at the Division I level and the 8th in the WCHA conference. The Chargers represented the University of Alabama Huntsville and were coached by Lance West, in his 1st season.

The start of the college hockey season was delayed due to the ongoing coronavirus pandemic. As a result, Alabama–Huntsville's first scheduled game was in mid-November as opposed to early-October, which was the norm.

== Season ==
As a result of the ongoing COVID-19 pandemic the entire college ice hockey season was delayed. Because the NCAA had previously announced that all winter sports athletes would retain whatever eligibility they possessed through at least the following year, none of Alabama–Huntsville's players would lose a season of play. However, the NCAA also approved a change in its transfer regulations that would allow players to transfer and play immediately rather than having to sit out a season, as the rules previously required.

Due to the program's financial crisis that nearly prevented the Chargers from fielding a team for this season, as well as the departure of former head coach Mike Corbett, many players transferred to other teams in the offseason. The loss of the experience these players possessed hamstrung the Chargers efforts to improve their record and ended with the team predictably near the bottom of the conference. UAH won only 3 of their 22 games all season but were rescued from a last-place finish by Ferris State winning only one of their games. Despite the few wins, there were some positive signs from the hastily assembled team; freshman Tyrone Bronte led the team in scoring, indicating that the team may be able to recover from its recent struggles if the program's financial stability could be assured.

== Departures ==
Player	Position	Nationality	Cause
Josh Astorino	Goaltender	Canada	Left program
Austin Beaulieu	Forward	United States	Graduation (Signed with Utah Grizzlies)
Max Coyle	Defenseman	Canada	Transferred to Bowling Green
Tanner Hickey	Defenseman	Canada	Transferred to Arizona State
Liam Izyk	Forward	Canada	Transferred to Boston College
Connor James	Defenseman	Canada	Graduation
Jack Jeffers	Forward	Canada	Transferred to Lake Superior State
Daneel Lategan	Forward	South Africa	Transferred to Alberta
Bailey Newton	Defenseman	United Kingdom	Transferred to Western Ontario
Sean Rappleyea	Defenseman	United States	Graduation
Christian Rajic	Forward	Canada	Transferred to Long Island
Teddy Rotenberger	Defenseman	United States	Left program
Brandon Salerno	Forward	Canada	Graduation (Signed with Dogs de Cholet)
Mark Sinclair	Goaltender	Canada	Transferred to Michigan Tech

== Recruiting ==
Player	Position	Nationality	Age	Notes
Ayodele Adeniye	Defenseman	United States	21	Columbus, OH
Jonah Alexander	Forward	Canada	20	Toronto, ON
Tyrone Bronte	Forward	Australia	21	Melbourne, AUS
Joshua Corrow	Defenseman	United States	20	New Port Richey, FL
Noah Finstrom	Forward	United States	21	New Baltimore, MI
Quinn Green	Forward	United States	21	West Chicago, IL
Mick Heneghan	Defenseman	United States	21	Niles, IL
Derek Krall	Goaltender	Canada	21	Crofton, BC
Josh Martin	Defenseman	United States	21	Brownstown, MI
Nick Michel	Forward	United States	21	Waconia, MN
Brian Scoville	Defenseman	United States	21	Agawam, MA
Bennett Stockdale	Forward	Canada	21	Ottawa, ON
Frank Vitucci	Forward	United States	21	Yardley, PA
Conor Witherspoon	Forward	United States	21	Metamora, MI

== Roster ==
As of October 14, 2020.

No.	Nat.	Player	Class	Pos	Height	Weight	DoB	Hometown	Previous team	NHL rights
2		Lucas Bahn	Sophomore	D	5' 11" (1.8 m)	175 lb (79 kg)	1999-09-11	Hendersonville, Tennessee	West Kelowna (BCHL)	—
3		Drew Lennon	Junior	D	6' 2" (1.88 m)	185 lb (84 kg)	1998-01-12	Bloomington, Illinois	Lone Star (NAHL)	—
4		Jay Powell	Junior	D	6' 7" (2.01 m)	200 lb (91 kg)	1997-10-01	Nashville, Tennessee	Minnesota Wilderness (NAHL)	—
5		Josh Martin	Freshman	D	6' 3" (1.91 m)	190 lb (86 kg)	1999-02-18	Brownstown, Michigan	Lone Star Brahmas (NAHL)	—
6		Ayodele Adeniye	Freshman	D	6' 5" (1.96 m)	195 lb (88 kg)	1999-03-24	Columbus, Ohio	Carleton Place (CCHL)	—
7		Bauer Neudecker	Junior	F	5' 8" (1.73 m)	165 lb (75 kg)	1998-06-01	St. Louis Park, Minnesota	Sioux City (USHL)	—
9		Quinn Green	Freshman	F	5' 11" (1.8 m)	170 lb (77 kg)	1999-01-28	West Chicago, Illinois	Topeka (NAHL)	—
11		Peyton Francis	Sophomore	F	6' 1" (1.85 m)	175 lb (79 kg)	1999-04-12	Oakville, Ontario	Carleton Place (CCHL)	—
12		Connor Merkley	Senior	F	6' 1" (1.85 m)	190 lb (86 kg)	1996-09-03	Portland, Ontario	Carleton Place (CCHL)	—
13		Ben Allen	Junior	F	5' 9" (1.75 m)	175 lb (79 kg)	1997-07-31	Allen, Texas	Melfort (SJHL)	—
14		Jonah Alexander	Freshman	F	5' 11" (1.8 m)	185 lb (84 kg)	1999-11-12	Toronto, Ontario	St. Michael's (OJHL)	—
15		Joshua Corrow	Freshman	D	6' 0" (1.83 m)	190 lb (86 kg)	2000-09-21	New Port Richey, Florida	Whitecourt (AJHL)	—
16		Connor Wood	Senior	F	5' 8" (1.73 m)	180 lb (82 kg)	1996-08-09	Buford, Georgia	Odessa (NAHL)	—
18		Tyrone Bronte	Freshman	F	5' 10" (1.78 m)	165 lb (75 kg)	1999-05-07	Melbourne, Australia	Wilkes-Barre/Scranton (NAHL)	—
19		Conor Witherspoon	Freshman	F	5' 11" (1.8 m)	170 lb (77 kg)	1999-08-02	Metamora, Michigan	Shreveport (NAHL)	—
20		Mick Heneghan	Freshman	D	5' 11" (1.8 m)	170 lb (77 kg)	1999-03-02	Niles, Illinois	Northeast (NAHL)	—
21		Frank Vitucci	Freshman	F	6' 0" (1.83 m)	180 lb (82 kg)	1999-08-04	Yardley, Pennsylvania	Wellington (OJHL)	—
22		Dayne Finnson	Junior	D	5' 10" (1.78 m)	175 lb (79 kg)	1997-10-01	Arborg, Manitoba	Victoria (BCHL)	—
23		Nick Michel	Freshman	F	5' 10" (1.78 m)	180 lb (82 kg)	1999-03-16	Waconia, Minnesota	Janesville (NAHL)	—
24		Tyr Thompson	Junior	F	6' 0" (1.83 m)	180 lb (82 kg)	1998-09-26	Sherwood Park, Alberta	Whitecourt (AJHL)	—
26		Bennett Stockdale	Freshman	F	5' 11" (1.8 m)	185 lb (84 kg)	1999-06-02	Ottawa, Ontario	Johnstown (NAHL)	—
27		Brian Scoville	Freshman	D	6' 3" (1.91 m)	215 lb (98 kg)	1999-03-28	Agawam, Massachusetts	Langley (BCHL)	—
28		Noah Finstrom	Freshman	D	5' 10" (1.78 m)	175 lb (79 kg)	1999-09-17	New Baltimore, Michigan	Jamestown (NAHL)	—
30		Derek Krall	Freshman	G	6' 0" (1.83 m)	170 lb (77 kg)	1999-03-04	Crofton, British Columbia	Powell River (BCHL)	—
33		Adrian Danchenko	Sophomore	F	6' 2" (1.88 m)	185 lb (84 kg)	1999-03-29	Palm City, Florida	Wilkes-Barre/Scranton (NAHL)	—
35		George McBey	Sophomore	G	6' 2" (1.88 m)	180 lb (82 kg)	1998-04-20	Dallas, Texas	Brookings (NAHL)	—
41		David Fessenden	Sophomore	G	6' 6" (1.98 m)	230 lb (104 kg)	1998-04-30	Parker, Colorado	Northeast (NAHL)	—

== Standings ==
2020–21 Western Collegiate Hockey Association Standings
	Conference record										Overall record					
	GP	W	L	T	OTW	OTL	3/SW	PTS	GF	GA	GP	W	L	T	GF	GA
#4 Minnesota State †	14	13	1	0	1	1	0	39	56	15	27	22	5	1	100	46
#14 Lake Superior State *	14	9	5	0	2	2	0	27	39	34	29	19	7	3	86	63
#18 Bowling Green	14	8	5	1	0	2	0	27	46	34	31	20	10	1	108	67
#10 Bemidji State	14	8	5	1	3	2	0	24	42	34	29	16	10	3	82	70
Michigan Tech	14	7	7	0	1	0	0	20	38	35	30	17	12	1	78	63
Northern Michigan	14	6	7	1	2	2	1	20	40	47	29	11	17	1	79	103
Alabama–Huntsville	14	3	11	0	1	0	0	8	18	49	22	3	18	1	31	80
Ferris State	14	0	13	1	0	1	1	3	28	59	25	1	23	1	55	103
Alaska	0	-	-	-	-	-	-	-	-	-	0	-	-	-	-	-
Alaska Anchorage	0	-	-	-	-	-	-	-	-	-	0	-	-	-	-	-
Championship: March 20, 2021 † indicates conference regular season champion * indicates conference tournament champion Rankings: USCHO.com Top 20 Poll

== Schedule and results ==
Date	Time	Opponent^{#}	Rank^{#}	Site	TV	Decision	Result	Attendance	Record
Regular season
November 21	6:05 PM	at Robert Morris*		Colonials Arena • Neville Township, Pennsylvania		McBey	L 2–5	0	0–1–0
November 22	3:05 PM	at Robert Morris*		Colonials Arena • Neville Township, Pennsylvania		Krall	L 3–4	0	0–2–0
December 5	4:07 PM	at Lake Superior State*		Taffy Abel Arena • Sault Ste. Marie, Michigan		Fessenden	T 2–2 ^{SOL}	0	0–2–1
December 6	2:07 PM	at Lake Superior State*		Taffy Abel Arena • Sault Ste. Marie, Michigan		Krall	L 2–3	0	0–3–1
January 2	3:07 PM	at Michigan Tech		MacInnes Student Ice Arena • Houghton, Michigan	FloHockey.tv	Fessenden	L 0–4	200	0–4–1 (0–1–0)
January 3	1:07 PM	at Michigan Tech		MacInnes Student Ice Arena • Houghton, Michigan	FloHockey.tv	Fessenden	L 1–2	200	0–5–1 (0–2–0)
January 8	7:00 PM	vs. Ferris State		Von Braun Center • Huntsville, Alabama	FloHockey.tv	Fessenden	W 5–4 ^{OT}	1,124	1–5–1 (1–2–0)
January 9	7:00 PM	vs. Ferris State		Von Braun Center • Huntsville, Alabama	FloHockey.tv	Fessenden	W 2–0	1,228	2–5–1 (2–2–0)
February 5	7:00 PM	vs. Michigan Tech*		Von Braun Center • Huntsville, Alabama		Fessenden	L 1–3	1,433	2–6–1
February 6	5:00 PM	vs. Michigan Tech*		Von Braun Center • Huntsville, Alabama		Krall	L 1–4	1,373	2–7–1
February 11	7:07 PM	vs. #3 Minnesota State		Von Braun Center • Huntsville, Alabama	FloHockey.tv	Fessenden	L 1–4	888	2–8–1 (2–3–0)
February 12	7:07 PM	vs. Minnesota State		Von Braun Center • Huntsville, Alabama	FloHockey.tv	Krall	L 0–5	1,281	2–9–1 (2–4–0)
February 16	3:37 PM	at Northern Michigan		Berry Events Center • Marquette, Michigan	FloHockey.tv	Fessenden	W 3–1	0	3–9–1 (3–4–0)
February 17	6:07 PM	at Northern Michigan		Berry Events Center • Marquette, Michigan	FloHockey.tv	Krall	L 2–8	0	3–10–1 (3–5–0)
February 19	6:00 PM	at #20 Lake Superior State		Taffy Abel Arena • Sault Ste. Marie, Michigan	FloHockey.tv	Fessenden	L 1–2	0	3–11–1 (3–6–0)
February 20	4:00 PM	at #20 Lake Superior State		Taffy Abel Arena • Sault Ste. Marie, Michigan	FloHockey.tv	Fessenden	L 1–4	0	3–12–1 (3–7–0)
February 24	6:07 PM	at #13 Bowling Green		Slater Family Ice Arena • Bowling Green, Ohio	FloHockey.tv	Fessenden	L 0–5	300	3–13–1 (3–8–0)
February 28	3:07 PM	vs. #13 Bowling Green		Von Braun Center • Huntsville, Alabama	FloHockey.tv	Fessenden	L 2–4	1,313	3–14–1 (3–9–0)
March 6	4:07 PM	at #17 Bemidji State		Sanford Center • Bemidji, Minnesota	FloHockey.tv	Fessenden	L 0–2	250	3–15–1 (3–10–0)
March 7	2:07 PM	at #17 Bemidji State		Sanford Center • Bemidji, Minnesota	FloHockey.tv	Fessenden	L 0–4	250	3–16–1 (3–11–0)
WCHA Tournament
March 12	6:07 PM	at #18 Lake Superior State*		Taffy Abel Arena • Sault Ste. Marie, Michigan (WCHA Quarterfinals game 1)		Fessenden	L 1–6	0	3–17–1
March 13	4:07 PM	at #18 Lake Superior State*		Taffy Abel Arena • Sault Ste. Marie, Michigan (WCHA Quarterfinals game 2)		Fessenden	L 1–4	0	3–18–1
Alabama–Huntsville Lost Series 0–2
*Non-conference game. ^{#}Rankings from USCHO.com Poll. All times are in Central Time.

== Scoring Statistics ==
Name	Position	Games	Goals	Assists	Points	PIM
Tyrone Bronte	C	22	4	9	13	8
Bauer Neudecker	F	22	5	7	12	0
Quinn Green	F	19	3	3	6	12
Tyr Thompson	F	22	3	3	6	4
Dayne Finnson	D	18	2	4	6	8
Lucas Bahn	D	22	2	4	6	4
Drew Lennon	D	22	2	3	5	8
Adrian Danchenko	F	20	2	2	4	37
Mick Henegan	D	13	1	3	4	8
Ben Allen	LW	20	1	3	4	2
Connor Merkley	C	14	1	2	3	25
Brian Scoville	D	22	1	2	3	22
Conor Witherspoon	F	21	0	3	3	10
Bennett Stockdale	RW	15	2	0	2	6
Connor Wood	RW	22	0	2	2	60
Noah Finstrom	F	18	1	0	1	2
Frank Vitucci	F	19	1	0	1	6
Josh Martin	D	10	0	1	1	4
Peyton Francis	C	18	0	1	1	2
Joshua Corrow	D	18	0	1	1	8
George McBey	G	1	0	0	0	0
Jay Powell	D	2	0	0	0	2
Nick Michel	F	4	0	0	0	2
Derek Krall	G	9	0	0	0	0
Jonah Alexander	C	10	0	0	0	4
David Fessenden	G	16	0	0	0	2
Ayodele Adeniye	D	21	0	0	0	22
Bench	-	22	0	0	0	16
Total			31	53	84	284

== Goaltending statistics ==
Name	Games	Minutes	Wins	Losses	Ties	Goals against	Saves	Shut outs	SV %	GAA
David Fessenden	16	897	3	11	1	44	445	1	.910	2.94
Derek Krall	9	401	0	6	0	30	176	0	.854	4.49
George McBey	1	20	0	1	0	5	18	0	.783	15.00
Empty Net	-	9	-	-	-	1	-	-	-	-
Total	22	1327	3	18	1	80	639	1	.889	3.62

== Rankings ==
Poll	Week																					
Poll	Pre	1	2	3	4	5	6	7	8	9	10	11	12	13	14	15	16	17	18	19	20	21 (Final)
USCHO.com	NR	NR	NR	NR	NR	NR	NR	NR	NR	NR	NR	NR	NR	NR	NR	NR	NR	NR	NR	NR	-	NR
USA Today	NR	NR	NR	NR	NR	NR	NR	NR	NR	NR	NR	NR	NR	NR	NR	NR	NR	NR	NR	NR	NR	NR

USCHO did not release a poll in week 20.

== Awards and honors ==
Player	Award	Ref
Tyrone Bronte	WCHA Rookie Team	
