= 2017–18 Alaska Anchorage Seawolves men's ice hockey season =

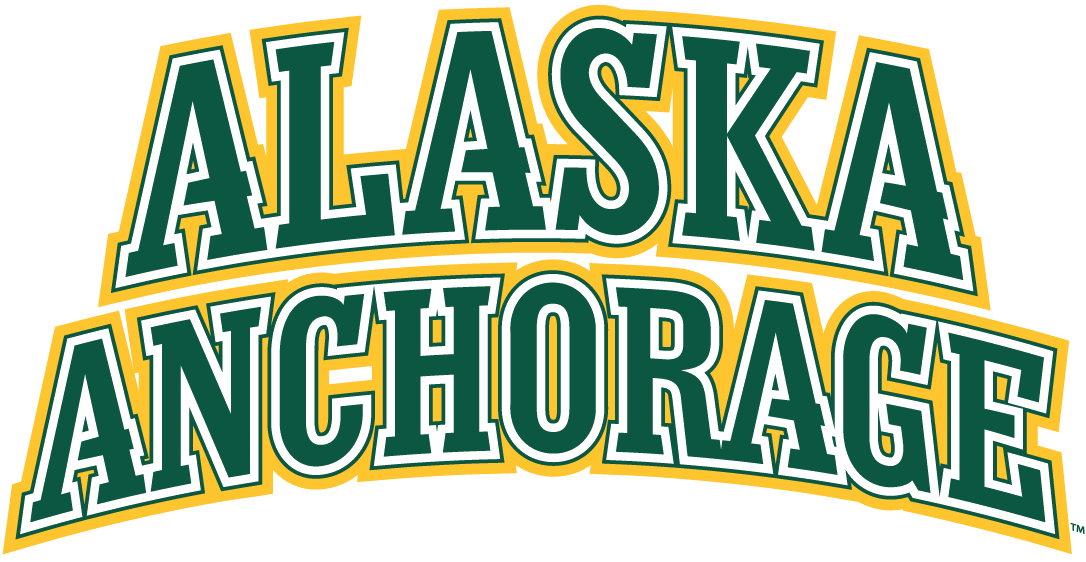
- Conference: 10th WCHA
- Home ice: Sullivan Arena

Rankings
- USCHO: NR
- USA Today: NR

Record
- Overall: 4–26–4
- Conference: 4–21–3–3
- Home: 1–13–3
- Road: 3–13–1
- Neutral: 0–0–0

Coaches and captains
- Head coach: Matt Thomas
- Assistant coaches: Chris Kamal; Louis Mass
- Captain: Matt Anholt
- Alternate captain(s): Tad Kozun; Olivier Mantha; Nolan Nicholas

The 2017–18 Alaska Anchorage Seawolves men's ice hockey season was the 39th season of play for the program, the 36th at the Division I level and the 25th in the WCHA conference. The Seawolves represented the University of Alaska Anchorage and were coached by Matt Thomas, in his 5th season.

== Season ==
Alaska Anchorage entered the season trying to pull out of the tailspin that had begun after Matt Thomas' surprising first season. The team started well, pushing North Dakota into overtime twice, but couldn't get their offense on track over the next few weeks. After finally getting their first win over Lake Superior State, the Seawolves ran off three consecutive wins in mid-November and looked like they may have found a recipe for success.

Unfortunately, as soon as December rolled around, the offense dried up and Alaska Anchorage lost 19 of their next 20 games. During the run, senior netminder Olivier Mantha did what he could to keep the Seawolves within striking distance, be he was called upon to stop more than 40 shots on multiple occasions. While Brody Claeys got some starts in towards the end of the season, Mantha was in net for the season finale against Alaska and finally got some support when the Seawolves scored a season-high 5 goals. Mantha ended the season as well as his college career on a high note with a second win, salvaging an otherwise terrible season.

== Departures ==
Player	Position	Nationality	Cause
Aleksi Ainali	Forward	Finland	Signed professional contract (Vaasan Sport)
Conor Deal	Forward	United States	Left program (retired)
Bradley Duwe	Forward	United States	Graduation (retired)
Dylan Hubbs	Forward	Canada	Graduation (signed with Tulsa Oilers)
Sean MacTavish	Forward	Canada	Transferred to MacEwan
Mason Mitchell	Forward	Canada	Signed professional contract (Washington Capitals)
Rasmus Reijola	Goaltender	Finland	Graduation (signed with Rovaniemen Kiekko)
Eric Roberts	Defenseman	Canada	Left program (retired)
Chase Van Allen	Defenseman	United States	Graduation (signed with Alaska Aces)
Connor Wright	Forward	United States	Graduation (retired)

== Recruiting ==
Player	Position	Nationality	Age	Notes
Alec Butcher	Forward	United States	23	Anchorage, AK; transferred from Sacred Heart
Brody Claeys	Goaltender	Canada	20	Dauphin, MB
Trey deGraaf	Forward	Canada	21	Red Deer, AB
Drake Glover	Forward	United States	21	Anchorage, AK
Zac Masson	Forward	Canada	21	Newmarket, ON
Aaron McPheters	Defenseman	United States	20	Anchorage, AK
Eric Sinclair	Defenseman	Canada	21	Kenora, ON
Joe Sofo	Forward	United States	21	Sylvania, OH
Kristian Stead	Goaltender	Canada	20	Merritt, BC
Brandon Switzer	Forward	Canada	21	Brandon, MB
Cameron Trott	Defenseman	Canada	20	Anmore, BC
Jordan Xavier	Forward	Canada	20	Calgary, AB

== Roster ==
No.	Nat.	Player	Class	Pos	Height	Weight	DoB	Hometown	Previous team	NHL rights
1	(Canada)	Brody Claeys	Freshman	G	6' 4" (1.93 m)	209 lb (95 kg)	1996-10-02	Dauphin, Manitoba	Alberni Valley Bulldogs (BCHL)	—
4	(Canada)	Tanner Johnson	Senior	D	6' 1" (1.85 m)	196 lb (89 kg)	1995-09-24	Castlegar, British Columbia	Langley Rivermen (BCHL)	—
6	(Canada)	Jarrett Brown	Senior	D	5' 11" (1.8 m)	194 lb (88 kg)	1994-01-13	Beaumont, Alberta	Cowichan Valley Capitals (BCHL)	—
7	(Canada)	Nolan Nicholas (A)	Sophomore	D	5' 11" (1.8 m)	203 lb (92 kg)	1995-09-24	Thunder Bay, Ontario	Sioux Falls Stampede (USHL)	—
8	(United States)	Drake Glover	Freshman	F	6' 1" (1.85 m)	185 lb (84 kg)	1996-03-05	Anchorage, Alaska	Lone Star Brahmas (NAHL)	—
9	(United States)	Alec Butcher	Senior	F	5' 10" (1.78 m)	183 lb (83 kg)	1994-04-15	Anchorage, Alaska	Sacred Heart (AHA)	—
10	(United States)	Joe Sofo	Freshman	F	5' 10" (1.78 m)	181 lb (82 kg)	1996-08-07	Sylvania, Ohio	Coulee Region Chill (NAHL)	—
11	(United States)	Austin Azurdia	Senior	F	6' 0" (1.83 m)	185 lb (84 kg)	1993-07-27	Wenatchee, Washington	Langley Rivermen (BCHL)	—
12	(United States)	Nils Rygaard	Junior	F	5' 11" (1.8 m)	190 lb (86 kg)	1995-04-11	Cheektowaga, New York	Janesville Jets (NAHL)	—
13	(Canada)	Brandon Switzer	Freshman	F	5' 10" (1.78 m)	174 lb (79 kg)	1995-11-20	Brandon, Manitoba	Flin Flon Bombers (SJHL)	—
17	(Canada)	Matt Anholt (C)	Senior	F	5' 10" (1.78 m)	185 lb (84 kg)	1994-05-15	Prince Albert, Saskatchewan	West Kelowna Warriors (BCHL)	—
18	(Finland)	Tomi Hiekkavirta	Sophomore	D	6' 0" (1.83 m)	182 lb (83 kg)	1996-04-05	Helsinki, Finland	HIFK U20 (Nuorten SM-liiga)	—
19	(United States)	Alex Jackstadt	Junior	F	5' 7" (1.7 m)	154 lb (70 kg)	1994-03-15	Anchorage, Alaska	Kenai River Brown Bears (NAHL)	—
20	(Canada)	Corey Renwick	Sophomore	F	6' 0" (1.83 m)	192 lb (87 kg)	1995-03-28	Nanoose Bay, British Columbia	Nanaimo Clippers (BCHL)	—
21	(Canada)	Tad Kozun (A)	Senior	F	5' 11" (1.8 m)	170 lb (77 kg)	1993-03-03	Nipawin, Saskatchewan	Nipawin Hawks (SJHL)	—
22	(Canada)	Cameron Trott	Freshman	D	6' 3" (1.91 m)	205 lb (93 kg)	1997-04-19	Anmore, British Columbia	Vernon Vipers (BCHL)	—
23	(Canada)	Eric Sinclair	Freshman	D	6' 0" (1.83 m)	175 lb (79 kg)	1996-02-19	Kenora, Ontario	Flin Flon Bombers (SJHL)	—
27	(United States)	Jeremiah Luedtke	Junior	F	5' 9" (1.75 m)	159 lb (72 kg)	1994-09-24	Seattle, Washington	Prince George Spruce Kings (BCHL)	—
28	(Canada)	Jordan Xavier	Freshman	F	6' 1" (1.85 m)	183 lb (83 kg)	1997-08-05	Calgary, Alberta	Okotoks Oilers (AJHL)	—
29	(Canada)	Trey deGraaf	Freshman	F	5' 11" (1.8 m)	180 lb (82 kg)	1996-01-30	Red Deer, Alberta	Okotoks Oilers (AJHL)	—
33	(Canada)	Olivier Mantha (A)	Senior	G	6' 1" (1.85 m)	183 lb (83 kg)	1993-01-18	La Tuque, Quebec	Penticton Vees (BCHL)	—
37	(Germany)	David Trinkberger	Sophomore	D	6' 5" (1.96 m)	209 lb (95 kg)	1996-08-25	Landshut, Germany	Sioux City Musketeers (USHL)	—
39	(Canada)	Kristian Stead	Freshman	G	6' 2" (1.88 m)	182 lb (83 kg)	1996-10-17	Merritt, British Columbia	Nipawin Hawks (SJHL)	—
41	(United States)	Aaron McPheters	Freshman	D	5' 8" (1.73 m)	165 lb (75 kg)	1997-03-25	Anchorage, Alaska	Fairbanks Ice Dogs (NAHL)	—
67	(Canada)	Jonah Renouf	Junior	F	5' 8" (1.73 m)	154 lb (70 kg)	1994-05-11	Mississauga, Ontario	Quinnipiac (ECAC)	—
71	(Canada)	Zac Masson	Freshman	F	6' 1" (1.85 m)	200 lb (91 kg)	1996-02-06	Newmarket, Ontario	Langley Rivermen (BCHL)	—
74	(Canada)	Cam Amantea	Junior	F	5' 10" (1.78 m)	176 lb (80 kg)	1994-02-17	Calgary, Alberta	Penticton Vees (BCHL)	—
76	(Canada)	Nathan Renouf	Junior	F	5' 8" (1.73 m)	154 lb (70 kg)	1994-05-11	Mississauga, Ontario	Quinnipiac (ECAC)	—
77	(United States)	Mason Anderson	Sophomore	D	6' 2" (1.88 m)	161 lb (73 kg)	1995-02-23	Anchorage, Alaska	Weyburn Red Wings (SJHL)	—
95	(Sweden)	Nicolas Erb Ekholm	Junior	F	6' 2" (1.88 m)	185 lb (84 kg)	1995-06-07	Malmö, Sweden	Malmö Redhawks J20 (J20 SuperElit)	—

== Standings ==
2017–18 Western Collegiate Hockey Association standings
	Conference record								Overall record					
	GP	W	L	T	SOW	PTS	GF	GA	GP	W	L	T	GF	GA
#9 Minnesota State†	28	22	5	1	0	67	116	58	40	29	10	1	153	84
#20 Northern Michigan	28	19	7	2	2	61	85	64	43	25	15	3	130	108
Bowling Green	28	17	6	5	2	58	87	63	41	23	12	6	122	100
Bemidji State	28	13	9	6	4	49	77	63	38	16	14	8	103	95
#16 Michigan Tech*	28	12	11	5	2	43	82	75	44	22	17	5	134	117
Ferris State	28	11	16	1	0	34	68	86	38	14	23	1	87	122
Alabama–Huntsville	28	10	16	2	1	33	69	86	37	12	23	2	84	121
Alaska	28	9	17	2	1	30	74	85	36	11	22	3	97	118
Lake Superior State	28	8	17	3	0	27	59	90	36	10	22	4	76	121
Alaska Anchorage	28	4	21	3	3	18	55	102	34	4	26	4	65	124
Championship: March 17, 2018 † indicates conference regular season champion (MacNaughton Cup) * indicates conference tournament champion (Broadmoor Trophy); Rankings: USCHO.com Top 20 Poll; updated March 5, 2018

== Schedule and results ==
Date	Time	Opponent^{#}	Rank^{#}	Site	TV	Decision	Result	Attendance	Record
Exhibition
September 30	7:07 PM	vs. Simon Fraser*		McDonald Center • Eagle River, Alaska (Exhibition)		Mantha	W 6–1	1,500	
Regular season
October 6	7:07 PM	vs. #7 North Dakota*		Sullivan Arena • Anchorage, Alaska		Mantha	T 1–1 ^{SOL}	2,563	0–0–1
October 7	7:07 PM	vs. #7 North Dakota*		Sullivan Arena • Anchorage, Alaska		Mantha	L 2–3 ^{OT}	2,506	0–1–1
October 13	5:37 PM	at Colorado College*		World Arena • Colorado Springs, Colorado		Mantha	L 1–6	4,357	0–2–1
October 14	5:07 PM	at Colorado College*		World Arena • Colorado Springs, Colorado		Mantha	L 2–3	4,764	0–3–1
October 20	7:07 PM	vs. Alaska*		Sullivan Arena • Anchorage, Alaska (Governor's Cup)		Mantha	L 2–6	2,846	0–4–1
October 21	7:07 PM	at Alaska*		Carlson Center • Fairbanks, Alaska (Governor's Cup)		Mantha	L 2–3	3,128	0–5–1
November 3	3:07 PM	at Lake Superior State		Taffy Abel Arena • Sault Ste. Marie, Michigan		Mantha	L 2–3 ^{OT}	1,221	0–6–1 (0–1–0)
November 4	3:07 PM	at Lake Superior State		Taffy Abel Arena • Sault Ste. Marie, Michigan		Mantha	W 4–1	1,381	1–6–1 (1–1–0)
November 10	4:07 PM	at Alabama–Huntsville		Von Braun Center • Huntsville, Alabama		Mantha	L 1–5	3,128	1–7–1 (1–2–0)
November 11	4:07 PM	at Alabama–Huntsville		Von Braun Center • Huntsville, Alabama		Mantha	T 3–3 ^{SOW}	3,072	1–7–2 (1–2–1)
November 17	7:07 PM	vs. Michigan Tech		Sullivan Arena • Anchorage, Alaska		Mantha	T 1–1 ^{SOW}	2,198	1–7–3 (1–2–2)
November 18	7:07 PM	vs. Michigan Tech		Sullivan Arena • Anchorage, Alaska		Mantha	T 3–3 ^{3x3 OTW}	2,063	1–7–4 (1–2–3)
December 1	3:07 PM	at Ferris State		Ewigleben Arena • Big Rapids, Michigan		Mantha	L 0–2	1,550	1–8–4 (1–3–3)
December 2	3:37 PM	at Ferris State		Ewigleben Arena • Big Rapids, Michigan		Mantha	L 2–5	1,821	1–9–4 (1–4–3)
December 8	7:11 PM	vs. Alaska		Sullivan Arena • Anchorage, Alaska (Governor's Cup)		Mantha	L 2–7	2,298	1–10–4 (1–5–3)
December 9	7:10 PM	vs. Alaska		Sullivan Arena • Anchorage, Alaska (Governor's Cup)		Mantha	L 2–3	2,264	1–11–4 (1–6–3)
December 15	4:07 PM	at Bemidji State		Sanford Center • Bemidji, Minnesota		Mantha	L 1–5	2,561	1–12–4 (1–7–3)
December 16	4:07 PM	at Bemidji State		Sanford Center • Bemidji, Minnesota		Mantha	L 0–4	2,581	1–13–4 (1–8–3)
January 5	7:07 PM	vs. #7 Minnesota State		Sullivan Arena • Anchorage, Alaska		Mantha	L 2–5	1,646	1–14–4 (1–9–3)
January 6	7:07 PM	vs. #7 Minnesota State		Sullivan Arena • Anchorage, Alaska		Mantha	L 1–4	1,776	1–15–4 (1–10–3)
January 12	7:07 PM	vs. Alabama–Huntsville		Sullivan Arena • Anchorage, Alaska		Mantha	L 2–4	1,866	1–16–4 (1–11–3)
January 13	7:07 PM	vs. Alabama–Huntsville		Sullivan Arena • Anchorage, Alaska		Mantha	W 2–1	2,338	2–16–4 (2–11–3)
January 19	3:07 PM	at #17 Bowling Green		Slater Family Ice Arena • Bowling Green, Ohio		Mantha	L 2–6	2,397	2–17–4 (2–12–3)
January 20	3:07 PM	at #17 Bowling Green		Slater Family Ice Arena • Bowling Green, Ohio		Mantha	L 2–3	3,682	2–18–4 (2–13–3)
January 26	7:07 PM	vs. #20 Northern Michigan		Sullivan Arena • Anchorage, Alaska		Mantha	L 2–4	1,483	2–19–4 (2–14–3)
January 27	7:07 PM	vs. #20 Northern Michigan		Sullivan Arena • Anchorage, Alaska		Mantha	L 3–5	1,708	2–20–4 (2–15–3)
February 2	4:07 PM	at #7 Minnesota State		Verizon Wireless Center • Mankato, Minnesota		Mantha	L 1–7	1,708	2–21–4 (2–16–3)
February 3	4:07 PM	at #7 Minnesota State		Verizon Wireless Center • Mankato, Minnesota		Claeys	L 3–4	4,207	2–22–4 (2–17–3)
February 9	7:07 PM	vs. Lake Superior State		Sullivan Arena • Anchorage, Alaska		Mantha	L 2–3 ^{OT}	1,640	2–23–4 (2–18–3)
February 10	7:07 PM	vs. Lake Superior State		Sullivan Arena • Anchorage, Alaska		Claeys	L 1–2	1,558	2–24–4 (2–19–3)
February 15	7:07 PM	vs. #14 Bowling Green		Sullivan Arena • Anchorage, Alaska		Claeys	L 2–5	1,276	2–25–4 (2–20–3)
February 16	7:07 PM	vs. #14 Bowling Green		Sullivan Arena • Anchorage, Alaska		Mantha	L 2–5	1,929	2–26–4 (2–21–3)
February 23	7:07 PM	at Alaska		Carlson Center • Fairbanks, Alaska (Governor's Cup)		Mantha	W 5–3	2,696	3–26–4 (3–21–3)
February 24	7:07 PM	at Alaska		Carlson Center • Fairbanks, Alaska (Governor's Cup)		Mantha	W 3–2	2,876	4–26–4 (4–21–3)
*Non-conference game. ^{#}Rankings from USCHO.com Poll. All times are in Alaska Time. Source:

== Scoring statistics ==
Name	Position	Games	Goals	Assists	Points	PIM
Austin Azurdia	F	29	13	6	19	33
Nicolas Erb Ekholm	C/RW	27	8	7	15	4
Tad Kozun	LW	33	5	10	15	50
Jonah Renouf	LW	26	3	11	14	8
Alec Butcher	LW/RW	16	8	5	13	6
Jarrett Brown	D	23	4	8	12	48
Jeremiah Luedtke	F	24	4	7	11	26
Jordan Xavier	F	29	4	7	11	12
Trey deGraaf	F	27	3	4	7	12
Nathan Renouf	LW	23	2	5	7	10
Tanner Johnson	D	24	1	6	7	13
Eric Sinclair	D	34	2	4	6	19
Tomi Hiekkavirta	D	23	1	5	6	16
Alex Jackstadt	F	32	1	5	6	26
Mason Anderson	D	19	2	3	5	24
Joe Sofo	F	21	0	5	5	27
Aaron McPheters	D	17	0	4	4	8
David Trinkberger	D	22	0	4	4	25
Cameron Trott	D	10	2	1	3	6
Nils Rygaard	C/RW	24	1	2	3	10
Brandon Switzer	RW	14	0	2	2	10
Zac Masson	RW	26	0	2	2	17
Corey Renwick	F	30	1	0	1	12
Cam Amantea	F	19	0	1	1	28
Olivier Mantha	G	31	0	1	1	0
Nolan Nicholas	D	32	0	1	1	24
Matt Anholt	LW	1	0	0	0	0
Brody Claeys	G	7	0	0	0	0
Drake Glover	C	7	0	0	0	4
Bench	-	-	-	-	-	6
Total			65	116	181	484

== Goaltending statistics ==
Name	Games	Minutes	Wins	Losses	Ties	Goals against	Saves	Shut outs	SV %	GAA
Brody Claeys	7	269	0	3	0	15	132	0	.898	3.34
Olivier Mantha	31	1784	4	23	4	102	946	0	.903	3.43
Empty Net	-	14	-	-	-	7	-	-	-	-
Total	34	2067	4	26	4	124	1078	0	.897	3.60

== Rankings ==
Poll	Week																									
Poll	Pre	1	2	3	4	5	6	7	8	9	10	11	12	13	14	15	16	17	18	19	20	21	22	23	24	25 (Final)
USCHO.com	NR	NR	NR	NR	NR	NR	NR	NR	NR	NR	NR	NR	NR	NR	NR	NR	NR	NR	NR	NR	NR	NR	NR	NR	-	NR
USA Today	NR	NR	NR	NR	NR	NR	NR	NR	NR	NR	NR	NR	NR	NR	NR	NR	NR	NR	NR	NR	NR	NR	NR	NR	NR	NR

USCHO did not release a poll in Week 24.

== Awards and honors ==
Player	Award	Ref
Olivier Mantha	WCHA Outstanding Student-Athlete of the Year	
Eric Sinclair	WCHA All-Rookie Team	
