= Matt Thomas (ice hockey) =

Canadian ice hockey coach (born 1975)

Current position
- Title: Head coach
- Team: RIT
- Conference: Atlantic Hockey America
- Record: 20–25–3 (.448)

Biographical details
- Born: October 25, 1975 (age 51); Maple Ridge, British Columbia, Canada
- Education: Rochester Institute of Technology

Playing career
- 1993–1994: St. Michael's Buzzers
- 1994–1998: RIT
- Position: Center

Coaching career (HC unless noted)
- 1998–1999: RIT (assistant)
- 2000–2002: Maine (assistant)
- 2002–2004: Atlantic City Boardwalk Bullies (assistant)
- 2004–2005: Atlantic City Boardwalk Bullies
- 2005–2009: Fresno Falcons
- 2008–2013: Stockton Thunder
- 2013–2018: Alaska-Anchorage
- 2018–2021: Cincinnati Cyclones
- 2021–2025: Providence Bruins (assistant)
- 2025–present: RIT

Head coaching record
- Overall: 68–130–28 (.360)

Matt Thomas (born October 25, 1975) is a Canadian ice hockey coach, currently the head coach of the RIT Tigers men's team in Atlantic Hockey America, an NCAA Division I conference.

== Career ==
Following in his brother, Art's footsteps, Matt Thomas started his college career as a player for RIT during a period where the team was at the top of the Division III ranks. The Tigers finished as national runners-up in his sophomore season and continued with two more strong campaigns (including Thomas being captain in his final year), before Thomas ended his playing days and turned to coaching. Thomas stayed with RIT for one season as an assistant before moving on to Division I, signing up with Maine in the early 2000s. Thomas arrived in Orono, Maine, just after Shawn Walsh was diagnosed with a rare form of cancer and helped the team through the difficult period when Walsh died the following year and the team was turned over to Tim Whitehead.

Thomas remained under Whitehead for one year before heading to the professional ranks, serving as an assistant for the Atlantic City Boardwalk Bullies in the ECHL for two seasons before being promoted to head coach and director of hockey operations for the 2004–05 season. After the 42-win debut, Thomas was offered a position with the Fresno Falcons and moved west to take the job. Thomas continued his success in the ECHL with a 43-win, 100-point season, ending with Fresno reaching the conference finals in 2006. Thomas was able to get the Falcons to reach the playoffs in each of the following two seasons, but in 2008–09, with the economic downturn, Fresno announced that they would cease operations 30 games into the season, ending Thomas' tenure with the team. Thomas did not remain unemployed for long as his former team, since having relocated, offered him the chance to turn around their season and Thomas agreed to take over as head coach for the Stockton Thunder.

With the Thunder, Thomas was able to get the team back on the right track and make the playoffs is his half-season behind the bench. The next year he reached the conference finals for the second time and was finally able to get into the championship series in 2013. With his success at the minor professional level, Thomas was offered the chance to improve the NCAA Division I Alaska-Anchorage, which had not had a winning season in 20 years and agreed to take over from the departed Dave Shyiak. The Seawolves then produced their first above-.500 record since joining the WCHA. The following year saw the team produce 10 fewer wins and the program trended downward, finally bottoming out in 2018 with a record of 4–26–4. After his contract expired, Thomas left the program to return to professional hockey.

On 7 August 2018, he returned to the ECHL and was announced as the new head coach of the Cincinnati Cyclones. In his first season in Cincinnati, he led the team the regular season title and won the John Brophy Award for ECHL coach of the year. Prior to the start of the 2021–22 season, head coach Thomas was hired by the AHL's Providence Bruins as an assistant coach. Thomas returned to college hockey as the head coach at his alma mater after the retirement of Wayne Wilson in 2025.

== Career statistics ==
| | | | Regular season | | | | | Playoffs |
| Season | Team | League | GP | G | A | Pts | PIM | GP | G | A | Pts | PIM |
|---|---|---|---|---|---|---|---|---|---|---|---|---|
| 1993–94 | St. Michael's Buzzers | MetJHL | 46 | 13 | 27 | 40 | 110 | — | — | — | — | — |
| 1994–95 | RIT | ECAC West | 24 | 3 | 4 | 7 | 54 | — | — | — | — | — |
| 1995–96 | RIT | ECAC West | 18 | 1 | 12 | 13 | 24 | — | — | — | — | — |
| 1996–97 | RIT | ECAC West | 30 | 12 | 12 | 24 | 50 | — | — | — | — | — |
| 1997–98 | RIT | ECAC West | 30 | 9 | 19 | 28 | 26 | — | — | — | — | — |
| NCAA totals | | | 102 | 25 | 47 | 72 | 154 | — | — | — | — | — |

== Head coaching record ==
Record table
| Season | Team | Overall | Conference | Standing | Postseason |
|---|---|---|---|---|---|
Alaska Anchorage Seawolves (WCHA) (2013–2018)
| 2013–14 | Alaska–Anchorage | 18–16–4 | 12–12–4 | 6th | WCHA Semifinals |
| 2014–15 | Alaska Anchorage | 8–22–4 | 5–21–2 | 10th | |
| 2015–16 | Alaska Anchorage | 11–20–3 | 8–18–2 | 9th | |
| 2016–17 | Alaska Anchorage | 7–21–6 | 6–16–6 | 10th | |
| 2017–18 | Alaska Anchorage | 4–26–4 | 4–21–3 | 10th | |
| Alaska Anchorage: | | 48–105–21 (.336) | 35–88–17 (.311) | | |
RIT Tigers (AHA) (2025–present)
| 2025–26 | RIT | 17–17–2 | 13–11–2 | 5th | AHA Quarterfinals |
| 2026–27 | RIT | 3–8–1 | 1–2–0 | | |
| RIT: | | 20–25–3 (.448) | 14–13–2 (.517) | | |
| Total: | | 68–130–28 (.360) | | | |
National champion Postseason invitational champion Conference regular season champion Conference regular season and conference tournament champion Division regular season champion Division regular season and conference tournament champion Conference tournament champion
