= Dallas Ferguson =

Canadian ice hockey player and coach

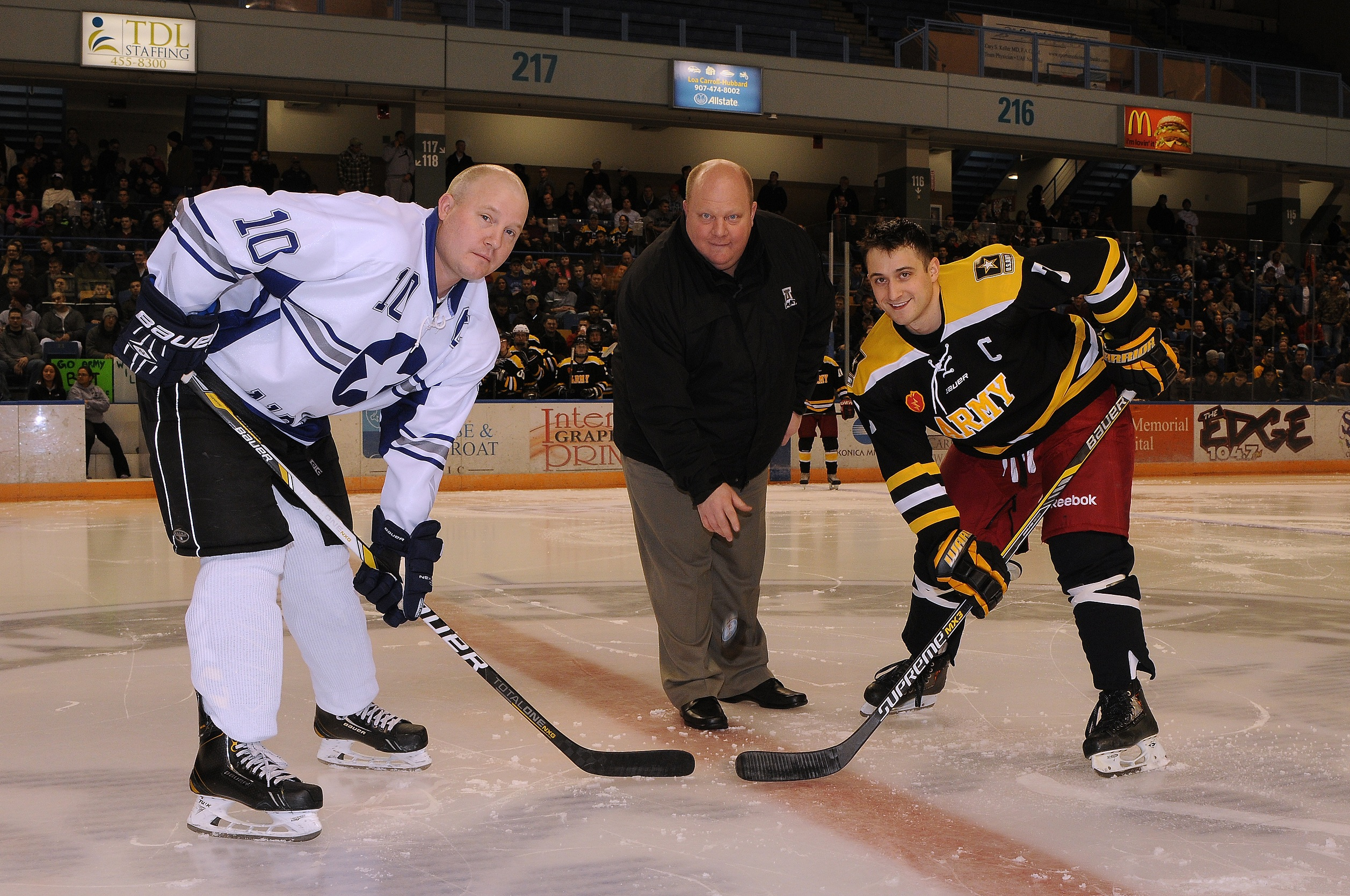

Current position
- Title: Assistant coach
- Team: Denver Pioneers
- Conference: NCHC

Biographical details
- Born: November 24, 1972 (age 53); Wainwright, Alberta, Canada
- Education: University of Alaska Fairbanks

Playing career
- 1992–1996: Alaska
- Position: Defenceman

Coaching career (HC unless noted)
- 2002–2004: Fairbanks Ice Dogs (assistant)
- 2004–2008: Alaska (assistant)
- 2008–2017: Alaska
- 2017–2018: Calgary Hitmen
- 2018–present: Denver (assistant)

Head coaching record
- Overall: 76–238–18 (.256)

Dallas Ferguson (born November 24, 1972) is a Canadian former professional ice hockey defenceman and coach. Ferguson retired as a player in 2000 following a four-year professional career in the West Coast Hockey League with the Alaska Gold Kings and Anchorage Aces.

In 2008, Ferguson became the 25th head coach of the Alaska Nanooks, taking over from Doc DeCastillo. He coached the 2009–10 Nanooks to the NCAA Tournament for the first time in program history. In 2014, due to a lack of institutional compliance, all wins and ties from 2007–08 through 2011–12 were forfeited and the program's lone NCAA appearance was vacated.

He was the head coach for the Calgary Hitmen of the Western Hockey League in the 2017–18 season.

He returned to college hockey as an assistant with the University of Denver Pioneers in 2018.

== Head coaching record ==
Record table
Season	Team	Overall	Conference	Standing	Postseason
Alaska Nanooks (CCHA) (2008–2013)
2008–09	Alaska	0–39–0†	0–28–0–0†	4th	CCHA third-place game (loss)
2009–10	Alaska	0–39–0†	0–28–0–0†	5th	NCAA Northeast regional semifinals (vacated)
2010–11	Alaska	0–38–0†	0–28–0–0†	7th	CCHA Quarterfinals
2011–12	Alaska	0–36–0†	0–28–0–0†	10th	CCHA first round
2012–13	Alaska	17–16–4	12–13–3–1	6th	CCHA first round
Alaska:		17–168–4	12–125–3		
Alaska Nanooks (WCHA) (2013–2017)
2013–14	Alaska	18–15–4	14–12–2	t-3rd	WCHA first round
2014–15	Alaska	19–13–2	14–12–2	4th	Ineligible
2015–16	Alaska	10–22–4	8–16–4	8th	WCHA first round
2016–17	Alaska	12–20–4	11–13–4	6th	WCHA Quarterfinals
Alaska:		59–70–14	47–53–12		
Total:		76–238–18			
National champion Postseason invitational champion Conference regular season champion Conference regular season and conference tournament champion Division regular season champion Division regular season and conference tournament champion Conference tournament champion

†Alaska was retroactively forced to forfeit all wins and ties due to player ineligibilities.
