= 2018 WCHA men's ice hockey tournament =

2018 WCHA Men's ice hockey tournament
- Dates: March 2–17, 2018
- Teams: 8
- Finals site: Berry Events Center; Marquette, Michigan
- Champions: Michigan Tech (11th title)
- Winning coach: Joe Shawhan (1st title)
- Most Outstanding Player: Patrick Munson (Michigan Tech)
- WCHA Men's Ice Hockey Tournaments

The 2018 WCHA Men's Ice Hockey Tournament was the 59th conference playoff in league history and 64th season where a WCHA champion was crowned. The 2018 tournament was played between March 2 and March 17, 2018, at four conference arenas, with the championship game being hosted by Northern Michigan at their home rink, Berry Events Center. By winning the tournament, Michigan Tech was awarded the Broadmoor Trophy and received the WCHA's automatic bid to the 2018 NCAA Division I Men's Ice Hockey Tournament.

== Format ==
The first two rounds of the postseason tournament featured a best-of-three games format. The top eight conference teams participated in the tournament. Teams were seeded No. 1 through No. 8 according to their final conference standings, with a tiebreaker system used to seed teams with an identical number of points accumulated. The higher seeded teams each earned home ice and host one of the lower seeded teams.

The final was a single game held at the campus site of the highest remaining seed.

=== Conference standings ===
Note: GP = Games played; W = Wins; L = Losses; T = Ties; PTS = Points; GF = Goals For; GA = Goals Against

2017–18 Western Collegiate Hockey Association standings
	Conference record								Overall record					
	GP	W	L	T	SOW	PTS	GF	GA	GP	W	L	T	GF	GA
#9 Minnesota State†	28	22	5	1	0	67	116	58	40	29	10	1	153	84
#20 Northern Michigan	28	19	7	2	2	61	85	64	43	25	15	3	130	108
Bowling Green	28	17	6	5	2	58	87	63	41	23	12	6	122	100
Bemidji State	28	13	9	6	4	49	77	63	38	16	14	8	103	95
#16 Michigan Tech*	28	12	11	5	2	43	82	75	44	22	17	5	134	117
Ferris State	28	11	16	1	0	34	68	86	38	14	23	1	87	122
Alabama–Huntsville	28	10	16	2	1	33	69	86	37	12	23	2	84	121
Alaska	28	9	17	2	1	30	74	85	36	11	22	3	97	118
Lake Superior State	28	8	17	3	0	27	59	90	36	10	22	4	76	121
Alaska Anchorage	28	4	21	3	3	18	55	102	34	4	26	4	65	124
Championship: March 17, 2018 † indicates conference regular season champion (MacNaughton Cup) * indicates conference tournament champion (Broadmoor Trophy); Rankings: USCHO.com Top 20 Poll; updated March 5, 2018

== Bracket ==
Teams are reseeded after the first round

Quarterfinals; March 2–4
1	Minnesota State	8	6	—
8	Alaska	2	2	—
2	Northern Michigan	7	2	5
7	Alabama-Huntsville	1	3	2
3	Bowling Green	2*	5	—
6	Ferris State	1	2	—
4	Bemidji State	3	4	—
5	Michigan Tech	5	5	—

Semifinals; March 9–11
1	Minnesota State	2	2	1
5	Michigan Tech	1	4	2*
2	Northern Michigan	6	0	3*
3	Bowling Green	1	1	2

Championship; March 17
5	Michigan Tech	2
2	Northern Michigan	0

Note: * denotes overtime periods

== Results ==
=== Quarterfinals ===
==== (1) Minnesota State vs. (8) Alaska ====
March 2	Minnesota State	8–2	Alaska	Verizon Arena	Recap
(Rivera, Spooner) Brad McClure (10) - 02:18 (Spooner) Reggie Lutz (7) - 10:53 (Zmolek, Suess) Marc Michaelis (17) - GW - 15:58		First period	04:04 - Ross Heidt (7) (Staley, Leiter)
(Brickley, Gerads) Max Coatta (5) - 05:58 (Knutson, Hookenson) Jake Jaremko (13) - 06:16 (Spooner, Rivera) Brad McClure (11) - 08:04 (Suess) Parker Tuomie (9) - 10:34		Second period	05:29 - Tristan Thompson (5) (Staley, Frye)
(Tuomie, LaCouvee) C. J. Suess (22) - PP - 08:53		Third period	No scoring
( 19 saves / 21 shots ) Connor LaCouvee		Goalie stats	Anton Martinsson ( 16 saves / 22 shots ) / Niko DellaMaggiore ( 15 saves / 17 shots )

March 3	Minnesota State	6–2	Alaska	Verizon Arena	Recap
(Frye) Tayler Munson (8) - PP - 00:51 (Lutz, Scheid) Dallas Gerads (6) - PP - 15:21		First period	10:50 - Edwin Hookenson (2) (Rivera, Lewis)
No scoring		Second period	No scoring
(Lewis) Nick Rivera (8) - GW SH - 05:43 (Spooner, Brickley) Connor Mackey (6) - 06:08 (Knutson, Tuomie) Daniel Brickley (10) - PP - 07:36 (Tuomie, Knutson) Marc Michaelis (18) - PP - 10:38		Third period	18:03 - PP - Zach Frye (11) (Van Tetering, Woods)
( 22 saves / 24 shots ) Connor LaCouvee		Goalie stats	Niko DellaMaggiore ( 33 saves / 39 shots )

Minnesota State wins series 2–0

==== (2) Northern Michigan vs. (7) Alabama–Huntsville ====
March 2	Northern Michigan	7–1	Alabama–Huntsville	Berry Events Center	Recap
(Rockwood, Beaulieu) Troy Loggins (18) - SH - 01:59 (Heikkila, Paskaruk) Demico Hannoun (2) - GW - 04:47 (Diamantoni, Rockwood) Robbie Payne (21) - 05:35 (Beaulieu, Rockwood) Denver Pierce (10) - PP - 08:50		First period	No scoring
(Rockwood, Loggins) Denver Pierce (11) - 17:19		Second period	No scoring
(Klimek, Craighead) Philip Beaulieu (10) - 06:51 (Diamantoni, Tolvanen) Robbie Payne (22) - 07:20		Third period	18:58 - PP - Brandon Parker (1) (Dunn, Kestner)
( 13 saves / 14 shots ) Atte Tolvanen		Goalie stats	Jordan Uhelski ( 4 saves / 8 shots ) / Mark Sinclair ( 28 saves / 31 shots )

March 3	Northern Michigan	2–3	Alabama–Huntsville	Berry Events Center	Recap
No Scoring		First period	No scoring
(Klimek, Beaulieu) Troy Loggins (19) - 03:52 (Beaulieu, Rockwood) Mitchell Slattery (2) - 14:18		Second period	11:47 - Josh Kestner (22) (McHugh); 17:22 - Adam Wilcox (2) (Poulsen)
No scoring		Third period	19:31 - GW - Josh Kestner (23) (unassisted)
( 11 saves / 14 shots ) Atte Tolvanen		Goalie stats	Jordan Uhelski ( 22 saves / 24 shots )

March 4	Northern Michigan	5–2	Alabama–Huntsville	Berry Events Center	Recap
(Loggins, Beaulieu) Denver Pierce (12) - 02:45		First period	10:54 - Josh Kestner (24) (Poulsen)
(Nardi, Black) Mitchell Slattery (11) - 00:55 (Beaulieu, Rockwood) Troy Loggins (20) - GW PP - 13:11 (Loggins, Beaulieu) Denver Pierce (13) - PP - 14:58		Second period	06:41 - PP - Max McHugh (3) (Gosselin, Larson)
(Rockwood) Troy Loggins (21) - EH EN - 19:38		Third period	No scoring
( 16 saves / 18 shots ) Atte Tolvanen		Goalie stats	Jordan Uhelski ( 28 saves / 32 shots )

Northern Michigan wins series 2–1

==== (3) Bowling Green vs. (6) Ferris State ====
March 2	Bowling Green	2–1	OT	Ferris State	Slater Family Ice Arena	Recap
(McLain, Spezia) Brandon Kruse (7) - 15:38		First period		No scoring
No scoring		Second period		15:50 - PP - Jason Tackett (2) (Rutkowski, Recktenwald)
No scoring		Third period		No scoring
(McLain, Spezia) Brandon Kruse (8) - GW - 12:05		First overtime period		No scoring
( 34 saves / 35 shots ) Ryan Bednard		Goalie stats		Darren Smith ( 62 saves / 64 shots )

March 3	Bowling Green	5–2	Ferris State	Slater Family Ice Arena	Recap
(Reichert, Johnson) Sam Craggs (3) - 05:25 (Baylis, Rauhauser) Max Johnson (11) - PP - 14:22		First period	No scoring
(Pohlkamp, Ford) Alec Rauhauser (9) - GW - 04:11		Second period	07:44 - Jason Tackett (3) (Rutkowski, Recktenwald); 14:08 - Jasen Fernsler (3) (Killins, MacDougall)
(Wright, Baylis) Brett D'Andrea (9) - 02:25 (Johnson, Baylis) Mitchell McLain (17) - PP - 15:55		Third period	No scoring
( 33 saves / 35 shots ) Ryan Bednard		Goalie stats	Darren Smith ( 32 saves / 37 shots )

Bowling Green wins series 2-0

==== (4) Bemidji State vs. (5) Michigan Tech ====
March 2	Bemidji State	3–5	Michigan Tech	Sanford Center	Recap
(Harris) Hampus Sjödahl (3) - 06:46 (Bauman, Miller) Justin Baudry (8) - PP - 17:41		First period	07:20 - Gavin Gould (13) (L'Esperance, Meek)
(Miller, Baudry) Brendan Harris (4) - PP - 03:18		Second period	16:43 - PP - Jake Lucchini (14) (Reinke, Auk)
No scoring		Third period	13:19 - PP - Jake Lucchini (15) (Auk, Reinke); 18:30 - GW - Seamus Donohue (3) (Steman); 19:44 - EN - Jake Jackson (10) (Lucchini, L'Esperance)
( 27 saves / 31 shots ) Michael Bitzer		Goalie stats	Devin Kero ( 22 saves / 25 shots )

March 3	Bemidji State	4–5	Michigan Tech	Sanford Center	Recap
No Scoring		First period	00:41 - Mitch Reinke (3) (L'Esperance, Lucchini); 04:13 - SH - Jake Lucchini (16) (L'Esperance)
(Whitecloud, Brady) Gerry Fitzgerald (7) - PP - 11:03		Second period	No scoring
(G. Fitzgerald, Whitecloud) Jay Dickman (15) - EA - 17:48 (L. Fitzgerald) Justin Baudry (9) - EA - 18:47 (Brady, Whitecloud) Charlie Combs (13) - EA - 19:04		Third period	13:01 - PP - Justin Misiak (7) (Auk, Reinke); 12:24 - Joel L'Esperance (9) (Lucchini, Birks); 18:32 - GW EN - Mark Auk (8) (Steman)
( 20 saves / 24 shots ) Michael Bitzer		Goalie stats	Devin Kero ( 33 saves / 37 shots )

Michigan Tech wins series 2–0

=== Semifinals ===
==== (1) Minnesota State vs. (5) Michigan Tech ====
March 9	Minnesota State	2–1	Michigan Tech	Verizon Arena	Recap
(Rivera, Brickley) Jared Spooner (4) - 18:26		First period	No scoring
(Tuomie, Scheid) Jake Jaremko (14) - GW PP - 01:22		Second period	No scoring
No scoring		Third period	09:19 - Joel L'Esperance (10) (Gould, Lucchini)
( 18 saves / 19 shots ) Connor LaCouvee		Goalie stats	Devin Kero ( 26 saves / 28 shots )

March 10	Minnesota State	2–4	Michigan Tech	Verizon Arena	Recap
(Brickley) Jake Jaremko (15) - 12:57		First period	09:19 - Justin Misiak (8) (unassisted); 15:20 - Mark Auk (9) (Jackson, Beretta)
(Jaremko, Scheid) Dallas Gerads (7) - PP - 13:13		Second period	12:04 - GW - Raymond Brice (4) (Gould, L'Esperance)
No scoring		Third period	19:53 - EN - Dylan Steman (7) (unassisted)
( 17 saves / 20 shots ) Connor LaCouvee		Goalie stats	Patrick Munson ( 31 saves / 33 shots )

March 11	Minnesota State	1–2	OT	Michigan Tech	Verizon Arena	Recap
No Scoring		First period		No scoring
(Tuomie) Zeb Knutson (14) - PP - 10:30		Second period		06:09 - Jake Jackson (11) (Baltus, Donohue)
No scoring		Third period		No scoring
No scoring		First overtime period		15:07 - GW - Jake Jackson (12) (unassisted)
( 26 saves / 28 shots ) Connor LaCouvee		Goalie stats		Patrick Munson ( 41 saves / 42 shots )

Michigan Tech wins series 2–1

==== (2) Northern Michigan vs. (3) Bowling Green ====
March 9	Northern Michigan	6–1	Bowling Green	Berry Events Center	Recap
(Rockwood, Pierce) Troy Loggins (22) - PP - 14:30		First period	01:49 - PP - Max Johnson (12) (Baylis, Rauhauser)
(Rockwood, Beaulieu) Robbie Payne (23) - GW PP - 02:20 (Loggins, Rockwood) Philip Beaulieu (11) - 09:17 (Hannoun, Beaulieu) Anthony Paskaruk (1) - 09:44		Second period	No scoring
(Craighead) Mitchell Slattery (4) - 10:28 (Diamantoni) Robbie Payne (24) - 16:55		Third period	No scoring
( 19 saves / 20 shots ) Atte Tolvanen		Goalie stats	Ryan Bednard ( 23 saves / 29 shots )

March 10	Northern Michigan	0–1	Bowling Green	Berry Events Center	Recap
No Scoring		First period	No scoring
No scoring		Second period	No scoring
No scoring		Third period	03:05 - GW PP - Connor Ford (8) (Schilling, Wright)
( 19 saves / 20 shots ) Atte Tolvanen		Goalie stats	Ryan Bednard ( 23 saves / 23 shots )

March 11	Northern Michigan	3–2	OT	Bowling Green	Berry Events Center	Recap
(Payne) Zach Diamantoni (6) - 18:55		First period		No scoring
No scoring		Second period		00:52 - Max Johnson (13) (McLain, Baylis)
(Black, Diamantoni) Joseph Nardi (9) - 10:53		Third period		19:52 - EA - Mitchell McLain (18) (Rauhauser, Baylis)
(Black, Vermeulen) Troy Loggins (23) - GW - 15:53		First overtime period		No scoring
( 30 saves / 32 shots ) Atte Tolvanen		Goalie stats		Ryan Bednard ( 39 saves / 42 shots )

Northern Michigan wins series 2–1

=== Championship ===
==== (2) Northern Michigan vs. (5) Michigan Tech ====
March 18	Northern Michigan	0–2	Michigan Tech	Berry Events Center	Recap
No Scoring		First period	No scoring
No scoring		Second period	05:36 - GW - Greyson Reitmeier (5) (Misiak, Meek)
No scoring		Third period	19:13 - EN - Joel L'Esperance (11) (Lucchini, Birks)
( 19 saves / 20 shots ) Atte Tolvanen		Goalie stats	Patrick Munson ( 21 saves / 21 shots )

== Tournament awards ==
=== Most Outstanding Player ===
Patrick Munson (Michigan Tech)
