= Governor's Cup (Alaska) =

The Governor's Cup is an annual award given to the winner of the most ice hockey games between Alaska Fairbanks and Alaska Anchorage during each season.

The Governor's Cup was first awarded in 1994 as a way to continue the rivalry between the two Division I programs despite being in separate conferences.

The Cup is awarded to whichever team finishes the season with a better record. If there is a tie at the end of the season the two teams hold a shootout to decide the champion.

The series was sponsored by Nissan for the first four years and then Alaska Airlines since 1998.

== Governor's Cup Results ==
Year	Champion	record
1994	Alaska–Fairbanks	1–1–0 (3–1 sow)
1995	Alaska–Anchorage	1–1–0 (2–1 sow)
1996	Alaska–Anchorage	1–0–1
1997	Alaska–Anchorage	2–0–0
1998	Alaska–Fairbanks	1–0–1
1999	Alaska–Fairbanks	1–1–0 (2–0 sow)
2000	Alaska–Anchorage	3–1–0
2001	Alaska–Anchorage	3–0–1
2002	Alaska–Fairbanks	3–1–0
2003	Alaska–Fairbanks	3–1–0
2004	Alaska–Fairbanks	2–2–0 (3–2 sow)
2005	Alaska–Fairbanks	2–1–1
2006	Alaska–Fairbanks	3–1–0
2007	Alaska–Anchorage	3–0–1
2008	Alaska–Anchorage	3–0–1
2009	Alaska–Anchorage	2–0–0
2010	Alaska-Fairbanks †	2–0–0
2011	Alaska-Fairbanks †	1–1–0 (2–0 sow)
2012	Alaska-Fairbanks †	1–1–0 (3–2 sow)
2013	Alaska-Fairbanks	2–0–0
2014	Alaska-Fairbanks	2–2–0 (2–1 sow)
2015	Alaska-Fairbanks	2–2–0 (1–0 sow)
2016	Alaska-Fairbanks	3–0–1
2017	Alaska-Fairbanks	3–1–0
2018	Alaska-Fairbanks	4–0–0
2019	Alaska-Fairbanks	3–1–0
2020	Alaska-Fairbanks	3-1-0
2023	Alaska-Fairbanks	6–0–0
2024	Alaska-Fairbanks	4–1–1
2025	Alaska-Fairbanks	3-2-1 (2-1 sow)

† Alaska's titles in 2010, 2011 and 2012 were vacated as a result of NCAA violations..

== All-Time Results ==
Team	Championships	record
Alaska Fairbanks	19	54–36–8
Alaska Anchorage	8	36–54–8
