= 2018–19 Alaska Anchorage Seawolves men's ice hockey season =

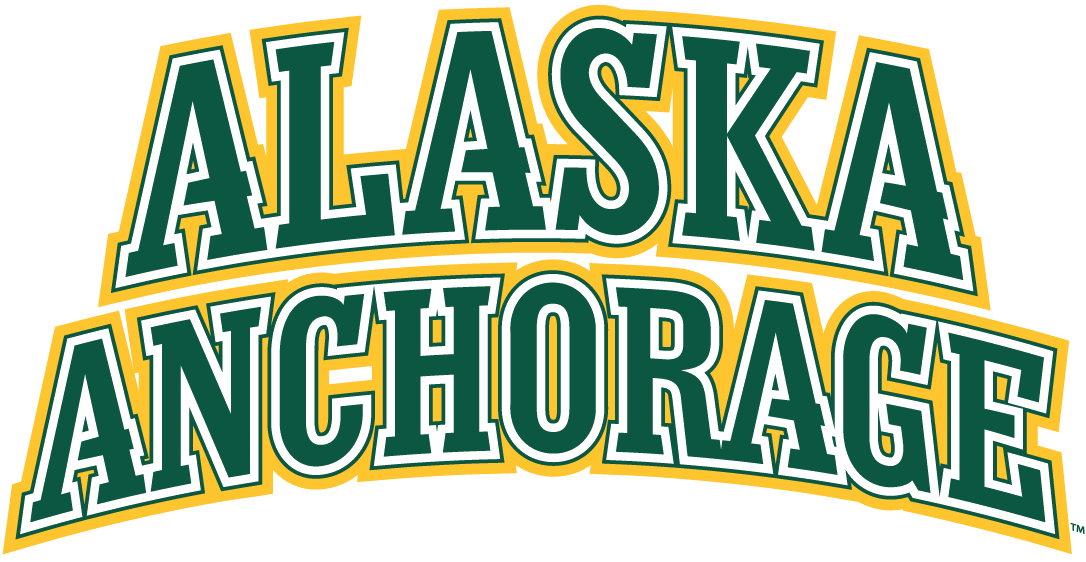
- Conference: 10th WCHA
- Home ice: Sullivan Arena

Rankings
- USCHO: NR
- USA Today: NR

Record
- Overall: 3–28–3
- Conference: 2–23–3–2
- Home: 1–12–3
- Road: 2–16–0
- Neutral: 0–0–0

Coaches and captains
- Head coach: Matt Curley
- Assistant coaches: Mark Phalon; Matt Bruneteau
- Alternate captain(s): Cam Amantea; Nolan Nicholas; Nils Rygaard; Eric Sinclair

The 2018–19 Alaska Anchorage Seawolves men's ice hockey season was the 40th season of play for the program, the 35th at the Division I level and the 26th in the WCHA conference. The Seawolves represented the University of Alaska Anchorage and were coached by Matt Curley, in his 1st season.

== Season ==
Any hope that the Seawolves would improve under new head coach Matt Curley were quickly banished when Alaska Anchorage dropped the opener 2–10. While they recovered to win the rematch a day later, the team's offense was too inept to get a second win for over two months. Alaska Anchorage had one of the worst offensive performances in the history of NCAA hockey, scoring just 40 goals in 34 games, and were shut out 11 times during the season. Throughout the season, the team struggled to even get chances on goal, averaging just over 22 shots per game while surrendering nearly 32 attempts on their own goal. Perhaps making the situation worse, Alaska Anchorage squandered many good performances by their goaltenders, who gave the team numerous chances to win, including two 0–0 finishes.

Despite producing the worst season in program history, Alaska Anchorage retained Curley as their head coach.

== Departures ==
Player	Position	Nationality	Cause
Mason Anderson	Defenseman	United States	Left program (retired)
Matt Anholt	Forward	Canada	Graduation (retired)
Austin Azurdia	Forward	United States	Graduation (retired)
Jarrett Brown	Defenseman	Canada	Graduation (retired)
Alec Butcher	Forward	United States	Graduation (signed with Wheeling Nailers)
Alex Jackstadt	Forward	United States	Left program (retired)
Tanner Johnson	Defenseman	Canada	Graduation (retired)
Tad Kozun	Forward	Canada	Graduation (signed with South Carolina Stingrays)
Olivier Mantha	Goaltender	Canada	Graduation (signed with Syracuse Crunch)
Brandon Switzer	Forward	Canada	Left program (signed with Killarney Shamrocks)
Cameron Trott	Goaltender	Canada	Returned to juniors (Vernon Vipers)

== Recruiting ==
Player	Position	Nationality	Age	Notes
Carmine Buono	Defenseman	Canada	21	Burnaby, BC
Kris Carlson	Goaltender	United States	21	Centreville, VA
Zach Court	Forward	Canada	21	Winnipeg, MB
Malcolm Hayes	Defenseman	United States	23	Atlanta, GA; graduate transfer from Maine
Andrew Lane	Defenseman	United States	21	Brighton, MI
Jared Nash	Forward	Canada	20	Stratford, ON
Drayson Pears	Defenseman	Canada	20	Victoria, BC
Tanner Schachle	Forward	United States	21	Wasilla, AK

== Roster ==
No.	Nat.	Player	Class	Pos	Height	Weight	DoB	Hometown	Previous team	NHL rights
1	(Canada)	Brody Claeys	Sophomore	G	6' 4" (1.93 m)	209 lb (95 kg)	1996-10-02	Dauphin, Manitoba	Alberni Valley Bulldogs (BCHL)	—
2	(Canada)	Nathan Renouf	Senior	F	5' 8" (1.73 m)	154 lb (70 kg)	1994-05-11	Mississauga, Ontario	Quinnipiac (ECAC)	—
3	(United States)	Andrew Lane	Freshman	D	5' 9" (1.75 m)	162 lb (73 kg)	1997-02-19	Howell, Michigan	Shreveport Mudbugs (NAHL)	—
4	(Canada)	Jonah Renouf	Senior	F	5' 8" (1.73 m)	154 lb (70 kg)	1994-05-11	Mississauga, Ontario	Quinnipiac (ECAC)	—
5	(United States)	Drake Glover	Sophomore	F	6' 1" (1.85 m)	185 lb (84 kg)	1996-03-05	Anchorage, Alaska	Lone Star Brahmas (NAHL)	—
7	(Canada)	Nolan Nicholas (A)	Junior	D	5' 11" (1.8 m)	203 lb (92 kg)	1995-09-24	Thunder Bay, Ontario	Sioux Falls Stampede (USHL)	—
8	(Canada)	Drayson Pears	Freshman	D	6' 1" (1.85 m)	191 lb (87 kg)	1998-03-09	Shawnigan Lake, British Columbia	Victoria Grizzlies (BCHL)	—
10	(United States)	Joe Sofo	Sophomore	F	5' 10" (1.78 m)	181 lb (82 kg)	1996-08-07	Sylvania, Ohio	Coulee Region Chill (NAHL)	—
11	(Canada)	Cam Amantea (A)	Senior	F	5' 10" (1.78 m)	176 lb (80 kg)	1994-02-17	Calgary, Alberta	Penticton Vees (BCHL)	—
12	(United States)	Nils Rygaard	Senior	F	5' 11" (1.8 m)	190 lb (86 kg)	1995-04-11	Cheektowaga, New York	Janesville Jets (NAHL)	—
14	(Canada)	Jared Nash	Freshman	F	5' 11" (1.8 m)	192 lb (87 kg)	1998-01-16	Stratford, Ontario	Penticton Vees (SJHL)	—
15	(United States)	Tanner Schachle	Freshman	F	6' 3" (1.91 m)	203 lb (92 kg)	1997-06-20	Wasilla, Alaska	Fairbanks Ice Dogs (NAHL)	—
16	(Sweden)	Nicolas Erb Ekholm (A)	Senior	F	6' 2" (1.88 m)	185 lb (84 kg)	1995-06-07	Malmö, Sweden	Malmö Redhawks J20 (J20 SuperElit)	—
17	(Canada)	Jordan Xavier	Sophomore	F	6' 1" (1.85 m)	183 lb (83 kg)	1997-08-05	Calgary, Alberta	Okotoks Oilers (AJHL)	—
18	(Finland)	Tomi Hiekkavirta	Junior	D	6' 0" (1.83 m)	182 lb (83 kg)	1996-04-05	Helsinki, Finland	HIFK U20 (Nuorten SM-liiga)	—
19	(Canada)	Zac Masson	Sophomore	F	6' 1" (1.85 m)	200 lb (91 kg)	1996-02-06	Newmarket, Ontario	Langley Rivermen (BCHL)	—
20	(Canada)	Corey Renwick	Junior	F	6' 0" (1.83 m)	192 lb (87 kg)	1995-03-28	Nanoose Bay, British Columbia	Nanaimo Clippers (BCHL)	—
21	(Germany)	David Trinkberger	Junior	D	6' 5" (1.96 m)	209 lb (95 kg)	1996-08-25	Landshut, Germany	Sioux City Musketeers (USHL)	—
22	(Canada)	Carmine Buono	Freshman	D	6' 2" (1.88 m)	203 lb (92 kg)	1997-02-22	Burnaby, British Columbia	Powell River Kings (BCHL)	—
23	(Canada)	Eric Sinclair (A)	Sophomore	D	6' 0" (1.83 m)	175 lb (79 kg)	1996-02-19	Kenora, Ontario	Flin Flon Bombers (SJHL)	—
24	(United States)	Malcolm Hayes	Graduate	D	6' 2" (1.88 m)	220 lb (100 kg)	1995-04-21	Atlanta, Georgia	Maine (HEA)	—
26	(United States)	Aaron McPheters	Sophomore	D	5' 8" (1.73 m)	165 lb (75 kg)	1997-03-25	Anchorage, Alaska	Fairbanks Ice Dogs (NAHL)	—
27	(United States)	Jeremiah Luedtke	Senior	F	5' 9" (1.75 m)	159 lb (72 kg)	1994-09-24	Seattle, Washington	Prince George Spruce Kings (BCHL)	—
28	(Canada)	Zach Court	Freshman	F	5' 10" (1.78 m)	183 lb (83 kg)	1997-01-04	Winnipeg, Manitoba	Merritt Centennials (BCHL)	—
29	(Canada)	Trey deGraaf	Sophomore	F	5' 11" (1.8 m)	180 lb (82 kg)	1996-01-30	Red Deer, Alberta	Okotoks Oilers (AJHL)	—
30	(United States)	Kris Carlson	Freshman	G	6' 1" (1.85 m)	207 lb (94 kg)	1997-08-19	Centreville, Virginia	Jersey Hitmen (USPHL)	—
39	(Canada)	Kristian Stead	Sophomore	G	6' 2" (1.88 m)	182 lb (83 kg)	1996-10-17	Merritt, British Columbia	Nipawin Hawks (SJHL)	—

== Standings ==
2018–19 Western Collegiate Hockey Association Standings
	Conference record								Overall record					
	GP	W	L	T	3/SW	PTS	GF	GA	GP	W	L	T	GF	GA
#6 Minnesota State †*	28	22	5	1	1	68	99	43	42	32	8	2	147	76
Northern Michigan	28	18	8	2	0	56	82	57	39	21	16	2	104	96
#13 Bowling Green	28	16	8	4	3	55	77	52	41	25	11	5	133	75
Lake Superior State	28	16	10	2	0	50	91	69	38	23	13	2	123	93
Bemidji State	28	13	11	4	2	45	71	63	38	15	17	6	95	94
Michigan Tech	28	13	12	3	1	43	68	63	38	14	20	4	90	101
Alaska	28	12	14	2	2	40	57	81	36	12	21	3	72	114
Alabama–Huntsville	28	8	18	2	2	28	61	93	38	8	28	2	67	129
Ferris State	28	7	18	3	0	24	68	96	36	10	23	3	90	123
Alaska Anchorage	28	2	23	3	2	11	29	86	34	3	28	3	40	115
Championship: March 23, 2019 † indicates conference regular season champion (MacNaughton Cup) * indicates conference tournament champion (Broadmoor Trophy); Rankings: USCHO.com Top 20 Poll

== Schedule and results ==
Date	Time	Opponent^{#}	Rank^{#}	Site	TV	Decision	Result	Attendance	Record
Exhibition
September 28	7:07 PM	vs. Simon Fraser*		McDonald Center • Eagle River, Alaska (Exhibition)		Carlson	W 5–1	1,500	
Regular season
October 6	7:07 PM	vs. Colorado College*		Sullivan Arena • Anchorage, Alaska		Stead	L 2–10	2,101	0–1–0
October 7	7:07 PM	vs. Colorado College*		Sullivan Arena • Anchorage, Alaska		Claeys	W 4–3	1,264	1–1–0
October 26	3:07 PM	at Ferris State		Ewigleben Arena • Big Rapids, Michigan		Carlson	L 0–4	1,273	1–2–0 (0–1–0)
October 27	3:07 PM	at Ferris State		Ewigleben Arena • Big Rapids, Michigan		Carlson	L 2–3	1,326	1–3–0 (0–2–0)
November 2	7:07 PM	vs. Bemidji State		Sullivan Arena • Anchorage, Alaska		Claeys	L 0–2	1,759	1–4–0 (0–3–0)
November 3	7:07 PM	vs. Bemidji State		Sullivan Arena • Anchorage, Alaska		Carlson	L 1–3	1,461	1–5–0 (0–4–0)
November 9	7:07 PM	vs. #10 Bowling Green		Sullivan Arena • Anchorage, Alaska		Claeys	T 0–0 ^{3x3 OTL}	1,692	1–5–1 (0–4–1)
November 10	7:07 PM	vs. #10 Bowling Green		Sullivan Arena • Anchorage, Alaska		Carlson	L 0–3	2,269	1–6–1 (0–5–1)
November 16	3:07 PM	at Northern Michigan		Berry Events Center • Marquette, Michigan		Claeys	L 0–3	2,029	1–7–1 (0–6–1)
November 17	3:07 PM	at Northern Michigan		Berry Events Center • Marquette, Michigan		Carlson	L 1–2	1,921	1–8–1 (0–7–1)
November 23	4:37 PM	at #17 North Dakota*		Ralph Engelstad Arena • Grand Forks, North Dakota		Carlson	L 2–5	11,155	1–9–1
November 24	4:07 PM	at #17 North Dakota*		Ralph Engelstad Arena • Grand Forks, North Dakota		Stead	L 3–4	11,086	1–10–1
December 7	4:07 PM	at #3 Minnesota State		Verizon Wireless Center • Mankato, Minnesota		Claeys	L 1–4	3,780	1–11–1 (0–8–1)
December 8	4:07 PM	at #3 Minnesota State		Verizon Wireless Center • Mankato, Minnesota		Stead	L 0–6	4,263	1–12–1 (0–9–1)
December 14	4:07 PM	at Bemidji State		Sanford Center • Bemidji, Minnesota		Carlson	L 1–5	2,902	1–13–1 (0–10–1)
December 15	2:07 PM	at Bemidji State		Sanford Center • Bemidji, Minnesota		Claeys	W 2–1 ^{OT}	2,852	2–13–1 (1–10–1)
December 29	4:07 PM	at Omaha		Baxter Arena • Omaha, Nebraska		Claeys	L 0–3	6,605	2–14–1
December 31	9:07 AM	at Omaha		Baxter Arena • Omaha, Nebraska		Carlson	L 0–4	6,102	2–15–1
January 4	5:07 PM	vs. Lake Superior State		Sullivan Arena • Anchorage, Alaska		Carlson	L 2–5	1,902	2–16–1 (1–11–1)
January 5	7:07 PM	vs. Lake Superior State		Sullivan Arena • Anchorage, Alaska		Claeys	L 1–3	1,842	2–17–1 (1–12–1)
January 11	7:07 PM	vs. Northern Michigan		Sullivan Arena • Anchorage, Alaska		Stead	L 1–5	1,562	2–18–1 (1–13–1)
January 12	7:07 PM	vs. Northern Michigan		Sullivan Arena • Anchorage, Alaska		Carlson	L 1–4	1,708	2–19–1 (1–14–1)
January 18	4:07 PM	at Alabama–Huntsville		Von Braun Center • Huntsville, Alabama		Carlson	L 2–6	1,708	2–20–1 (1–15–1)
January 19	5:07 PM	at Alabama–Huntsville		Von Braun Center • Huntsville, Alabama		Stead	L 3–6	1,109	2–21–1 (1–16–1)
January 25	7:07 PM	vs. Michigan Tech		Sullivan Arena • Anchorage, Alaska		Carlson	L 0–3	1,711	2–22–1 (1–17–1)
January 26	7:07 PM	vs. Michigan Tech		Sullivan Arena • Anchorage, Alaska		Stead	T 0–0 ^{SOW}	1,958	2–22–2 (1–17–2)
February 8	7:07 PM	at Alaska		Carlson Center • Fairbanks, Alaska (Governor's Cup)		Stead	W 4–1	2,220	3–22–2 (2–17–2)
February 9	7:07 PM	at Alaska		Carlson Center • Fairbanks, Alaska (Governor's Cup)		Stead	L 1–2	2,468	3–23–2 (2–18–2)
February 15	7:07 PM	vs. Ferris State		Sullivan Arena • Anchorage, Alaska		Stead	L 1–2	1,585	3–24–2 (2–19–2)
February 16	7:10 PM	vs. Ferris State		Sullivan Arena • Anchorage, Alaska		Carlson	T 1–1 ^{3x3 OTW}	1,856	3–24–3 (2–19–3)
February 22	3:07 PM	at Michigan Tech		MacInnes Student Ice Arena • Houghton, Michigan		Stead	L 2–3	2,323	3–25–3 (2–20–3)
February 23	3:07 PM	at Michigan Tech		MacInnes Student Ice Arena • Houghton, Michigan		Carlson	L 1–3	2,575	3–26–3 (2–21–3)
March 1	7:07 PM	vs. Alaska		Sullivan Arena • Anchorage, Alaska (Governor's Cup)		Stead	L 0–4	3,009	3–27–3 (2–22–3)
March 2	7:07 PM	vs. Alaska		Sullivan Arena • Anchorage, Alaska (Governor's Cup)		Stead	L 1–2	3,429	3–28–3 (2–23–3)
*Non-conference game. ^{#}Rankings from USCHO.com Poll. All times are in Alaska Time. Source:

== Scoring statistics ==
Name	Position	Games	Goals	Assists	Points	PIM
Nicolas Erb Ekholm	C/RW	33	6	7	13	14
Jeremiah Luedtke	F	33	7	3	10	16
Carmine Buono	D	29	3	6	9	37
Nils Rygaard	C/RW	33	3	6	9	16
Tomi Hiekkavirta	D	28	1	7	8	14
Drayson Pears	D	32	2	5	7	16
Tanner Schachle	LW	28	2	4	6	56
Trey deGraaf	F	30	0	6	6	6
Jonah Renouf	LW	27	2	3	5	18
Drake Glover	C	29	1	4	5	12
Eric Sinclair	D	33	3	1	4	37
Jordan Xavier	F	21	1	3	4	0
Joe Sofo	F	26	1	3	4	10
Corey Renwick	F	34	1	3	4	17
Zach Court	LW	25	0	3	3	10
Cam Amantea	F	14	2	0	2	40
Aaron McPheters	D	23	1	1	2	22
Andrew Lane	D	23	1	1	2	12
Malcolm Hayes	D	34	0	2	2	16
Jared Nash	C	18	1	0	1	6
Zac Masson	RW	22	1	0	1	16
David Trinkberger	D	26	1	0	1	26
Kristian Stead	G	13	0	1	1	2
Nolan Nicholas	D	33	0	1	1	25
Brody Claeys	G	9	0	0	0	0
Nathan Renouf	LW	10	0	0	0	4
Kris Carlson	G	15	0	0	0	0
Bench	-	-	-	-	-	12
Total			40	70	110	460

== Goaltending statistics ==
Name	Games	Minutes	Wins	Losses	Ties	Goals against	Saves	Shut outs	SV %	GAA
Brody Claeys	9	515	2	5	1	20	234	1	.921	2.33
Kris Carlson	15	850	0	13	1	49	421	0	.896	3.46
Kristian Stead	13	672	1	10	1	41	308	1	.883	3.66
Empty Net	-	19	-	-	-	5	-	-	-	-
Total	34	1058	3	28	3	115	963	2	.893	3.35

== Rankings ==
Poll	Week																										
Poll	Pre	1	2	3	4	5	6	7	8	9	10	11	12	13	14	15	16	17	18	19	20	21	22	23	24	25	26 (Final)
USCHO.com	NR	NR	NR	NR	NR	NR	NR	NR	NR	NR	NR	NR	NR	NR	NR	NR	NR	NR	NR	NR	NR	NR	NR	NR	NR	-	NR
USA Today	NR	NR	NR	NR	NR	NR	NR	NR	NR	NR	NR	NR	NR	NR	NR	NR	NR	NR	NR	NR	NR	NR	NR	NR	NR	NR	NR

USCHO did not release a poll in Week 25.
