= 2019 WCHA men's ice hockey tournament =

2019 WCHA Men's ice hockey tournament
- Dates: March 8–23, 2019
- Teams: 8
- Finals site: Mankato, Minnesota; Verizon Center
- Champions: Minnesota State (3rd title)
- Winning coach: Mike Hastings (3rd title)
- Most Outstanding Player: Nick Rivera (Minnesota State)
- WCHA Men's Ice Hockey Tournaments

The 2019 WCHA Men's Ice Hockey Tournament was the 60th conference playoff in league history and 65th season where a WCHA champion was crowned. The 2019 tournament was played between March 8 and March 23, 2019, at four conference arenas, with the championship game being hosted by Minnesota State at their home rink, Verizon Center. By winning the tournament, Minnesota State was awarded the Broadmoor Trophy and received the WCHA's automatic bid to the 2019 NCAA Division I Men's Ice Hockey Tournament.

== Format ==
The first two rounds of the postseason tournament featured a best-of-three games format. The top eight conference teams participated in the tournament. Teams were seeded No. 1 through No. 8 according to their final conference standings, with a tiebreaker system used to seed teams with an identical number of points accumulated. The higher seeded teams each earned home ice and host one of the lower seeded teams. (teams will NOT be re-seeded with each proceeding round).

The final was a single game held at the campus site of the highest remaining seed.

=== Standings ===
2018–19 Western Collegiate Hockey Association Standings
	Conference record								Overall record					
	GP	W	L	T	3/SW	PTS	GF	GA	GP	W	L	T	GF	GA
#6 Minnesota State †*	28	22	5	1	1	68	99	43	42	32	8	2	147	76
Northern Michigan	28	18	8	2	0	56	82	57	39	21	16	2	104	96
#13 Bowling Green	28	16	8	4	3	55	77	52	41	25	11	5	133	75
Lake Superior State	28	16	10	2	0	50	91	69	38	23	13	2	123	93
Bemidji State	28	13	11	4	2	45	71	63	38	15	17	6	95	94
Michigan Tech	28	13	12	3	1	43	68	63	38	14	20	4	90	101
Alaska	28	12	14	2	2	40	57	81	36	12	21	3	72	114
Alabama–Huntsville	28	8	18	2	2	28	61	93	38	8	28	2	67	129
Ferris State	28	7	18	3	0	24	68	96	36	10	23	3	90	123
Alaska Anchorage	28	2	23	3	2	11	29	86	34	3	28	3	40	115
Championship: March 23, 2019 † indicates conference regular season champion (MacNaughton Cup) * indicates conference tournament champion (Broadmoor Trophy); Rankings: USCHO.com Top 20 Poll

== Bracket ==
Quarterfinals; March 8–9
1	Minnesota State	3	4	X
8	Alabama–Huntsville	1	1	X
4	Lake Superior	4	3	X
5	Bemidji State	2	1	X
3	Bowling Green	3	6	X
6	Michigan Tech	2	2	X
2	Northern Michigan	5**	4	X
7	Alaska	4	3	X

Semifinals; March 15–16
1	Minnesota State	2	2	X
4	Lake Superior	1	0	X
2	Northern Michigan	1	1	X
3	Bowling Green	6	2**	X

Championship; March 23
1	Minnesota State	3*
3	Bowling Green	2

Note: * denotes overtime periods

== Results ==
=== Quarterfinals ===
==== (1) Minnesota State vs. (8) Alabama–Huntsville ====
March 8	Minnesota State	3-1	Alabama–Huntsville	Verizon Arena	Recap
(Rivera, French) Walker Duehr (9) - 05:09		First period	No scoring
(Gerard, Scheid) Marc Michaelis (17) - GW PP - 04:48		Second period	16:28 - Connor Merkley (3) (Finnson, Dunn)
(Scheid, Tuomie) Marc Michaelis (22) - PP - 05:26		Third period	No scoring
( 12 saves / 13 shots ) Dryden McKay		Goalie stats	Mark Sinclair ( 32 saves / 35 shots )

March 9	Minnesota State	4–1	Alabama–Huntsville	Verizon Arena	Recap
(Jaremko, Mackey) Reggie Lutz (5) - PP - 01:44 (Gerard) Parker Tuomie (14) - GW - 08:57		First period	No scoring
(Jaremko, Coatta) Reggie Lutz (6) - PP - 14:25 (Tuomie) Marc Michaelis (19) - 15:36		Second period	No scoring
No scoring		Third period	10:16 - Adam Wilcox (3) (Wood)
( 18 saves / 19 shots ) Dryden McKay		Goalie stats	Mark Sinclair ( 27 saves / 31 shots )

Minnesota State wins series 2–0

==== (2) Northern Michigan vs. (7) Alaska ====
March 8	Northern Michigan	5–4	2OT	Alaska	Berry Events Center	Recap
No Scoring		First period		16:38 - Tyler Cline (9) (Staley)
(Loughran, Readman) Joseph Nardi (8) - 02:09 (Frantti, Loven) Vincent de Mey (4) - 03:31		Second period		10:30 - Kyle Marino (5) (LaDouce, Doyle); 12:46 - Steven Jandric (9) (Newton, Young); 16:05 - Chase Ellingson (1) (Hope)
(Nardi, Readman) Griffin Loughran (6) - PP - 06:51 (Craighead, Beaulieu) Adam Rockwood (7) - EA - 19:46		Third period		No scoring
(Loughran, Beaulieu) Joseph Nardi (9) - GW - 10:30		Second overtime period		No scoring
( 38 saves / 42 shots ) Atte Tolvanen		Goalie stats		Anton Martinsson ( 39 saves / 44 shots )

March 9	Northern Michigan	4–3	Alaska	Berry Events Center	Recap
No Scoring		First period	08:06 - Kylar Hope (8) (Leiter, Jandric)
(Black, Rockwood) Denver Pierce (10) - 12:54 (Klee, Loven) Vincent de Mey (5) - 13:36		Second period	08:28 - Kyle Marino (6) (Doyle)
(Pierce) Troy Loggins (23) - 09:59 (Rockwood, Loggins) Darien Craighead (9) - GW PP - 11:58		Third period	17:52 - EA - Tyler Cline (6) (Thompson, Jandric)
( 26 saves / 29 shots ) Atte Tolvanen		Goalie stats	Anton Martinsson ( 26 saves / 30 shots )

Northern Michigan wins series 2–0

==== (3) Bowling Green vs. (6) Michigan Tech ====
March 8	Bowling Green	3–2	Michigan Tech	Slater Family Ice Arena	Recap
No Scoring		First period	06:56 - Raymond Brice (3) (Parrottino, Reitmeier)
No scoring		Second period	18:18 - SH - Alec Broetzman (8) (Reitmeier)
(Barber, Johnson) Connor Ford (14) - PP - 11:55 (Smith, Pohlkamp) Frédéric Létourneau (14) - 12:10 (Ford, Kruse) Max Johnson (14) - GW PP - 13:41		Third period	No scoring
( 23 saves / 25 shots ) Ryan Bednard		Goalie stats	Matt Jurusik ( 38 saves / 41 shots )

March 9	Bowling Green	6–2	Michigan Tech	Slater Family Ice Arena	Recap
(Johnson) Adam Smith (2) - 05:25 (Wright, Pohlkamp) Max Johnson (16) - 09:30 (Kruse, Johnson) Connor Ford (15) - GW PP - 10:24		First period	04:35 - PP - Jake Lucchini (10) (Bliss, Smith); 11:54 - Jake Lucchini (3) (Smith, Donohue)
(Schneider, Theorcharidis) Max Johnson (17) - PP - 07:36		Second period	No scoring
(unassisted) Frédéric Létourneau (6) - PS - 09:08 (unassisted) Connor McDonald (1) - SH EN - 11:05		Third period	No scoring
( 25 saves / 27 shots ) Ryan Bednard		Goalie stats	Matt Jurusik ( 25 saves / 30 shots ) / Devin Kero ( 4 saves / 4 shots )

Bowling Green wins series 2-0

==== (4) Lake Superior State vs. (5) Bemidji State ====
March 8	Lake Superior State	4–2	Bemidji State	Taffy Abel Arena	Recap
No Scoring		First period	07:20 - Nick Cardelli (9) (Harris, Billett)
(Eriksson) Diego Cuglietta (24) - 05:17 (Saccoman, Calder) Lukas Kaelble (2) - PP - 18:29		Second period	No scoring
(Calder, Saccoman) Anthony Nellis (15) - GW PP - 09:49 (unassisted) Max Humitz (15) - EN - 19:44		Third period	10:27 - EA - Brad Johnson (3) (Sillinger, Combs)
( 29 saves / 31 shots ) Nick Kossoff		Goalie stats	Zach Driscoll ( 17 saves / 20 shots )

March 9	Lake Superior State	3–1	Bemidji State	Taffy Abel Arena	Recap
No Scoring		First period	No scoring
(Nordqvist, Nellis) Max Humitz (16) - 09:29		Second period	12:01 - Justin Baudry (9) (Somoza, Ierullo)
(Nordqvist, Cuglietta) Hampus Eriksson (3) - GW PP - 06:30 (Cuglietta) Collin Saccoman (10) - EN - 19:22		Third period	No scoring
( 39 saves / 40 shots ) Nick Kossoff		Goalie stats	Zach Driscoll ( 31 saves / 33 shots )

Lake Superior State wins series 2–0

=== Semifinals ===
==== (1) Minnesota State vs. (4) Lake Superior State ====
March 15	Minnesota State	2–1	Lake Superior State	Verizon Arena	Recap
(Tuomie, Michaelis) Charlie Gerard (11) - 06:18 (French, Mackey) Walker Duehr (10) - GW - 07:20		First period	01:37 - Diego Cuglietta (25) (Humitz, Ruggiero)
No scoring		Second period	No scoring
No scoring		Third period	No scoring
( 20 saves / 21 shots ) Dryden McKay		Goalie stats	Nick Kossoff ( 29 saves / 31 shots )

March 16	Minnesota State	2–0	Lake Superior State	Verizon Arena	Recap
(Michaelis, Gerard) Julian Napravnik (8) - GW PP - 12:14 (Coatta, Scheid) Reggie Lutz (7) - PP - 13:27		First period	No scoring
No scoring		Second period	No scoring
No scoring		Third period	No scoring
( 31 saves / 31 shots ) Dryden McKay		Goalie stats	Nick Kossoff ( 28 saves / 30 shots )

Minnesota State wins series 2–0

==== (2) Northern Michigan vs. (3) Bowling Green ====
March 15	Northern Michigan	1–6	Bowling Green	Berry Events Center	Recap
No Scoring		First period	No scoring
No scoring		Second period	01:35 - Max Johnson (18) (Létourneau); 05:42 - GW - Adam Smith (3) (Ford, Létourneau)
(Loggins, Rockwood) Griffin Loughran (7) - 8:55		Third period	00:30 - PP - Brandon Kruse (9) (Rauhauser, Johnson); 01:23 - PP - Connor Ford (16) (Rauhauser, Johnson); 11:12 - Max Johnson (19) (Kruse, Johnson); 19:54 - Cameron Wright (9) (Barber, Linkenheld)
( 36 saves / 42 shots ) Atte Tolvanen		Goalie stats	Ryan Bednard ( 26 saves / 27 shots )

March 16	Northern Michigan	1–2	2OT	Bowling Green	Berry Events Center	Recap
No Scoring		First period		15:12 - Connor Ford (17) (Pohlkamp, Baylis)
(Beaulieu, Rockwood) Darien Craighead (10) - 00:21		Second period		No scoring
No scoring		Third period		No scoring
No scoring		Second overtime period		02:09 - GW - Sam Craggs (8) (Cullen, Rauhauser)
( 41 saves / 43 shots ) Atte Tolvanen		Goalie stats		Ryan Bednard ( 40 saves / 41 shots )

Bowling Green wins series 2–0

=== Championship ===
==== (1) Minnesota State vs. (3) Bowling Green ====
March 23	Minnesota State	3–2	OT	Bowling Green	Verizon Arena	Recap
No Scoring		First period		14:56 - Frédéric Létourneau (7) (Schneider, Cullen)
No scoring		Second period		No scoring
(Zmolek, Coatta) Jake Jaremko (6) - EA - 18:16 (McNeely, Tuomie) Connor Mackey (7) - EA - 19:04		Third period		01:28 - PP - Alec Rauhauser (4) (Johnson, Ford)
(French, McMahan) Nick Rivera (15) - GW - 01:37		First overtime period		No scoring
( 17 saves / 19 shots ) Dryden McKay		Goalie stats		Ryan Bednard ( 24 saves / 27 shots )

== Tournament awards ==
=== Most Outstanding Player ===
Nick Rivera (Minnesota State)
