= 2018–19 Alaska Nanooks men's ice hockey season =

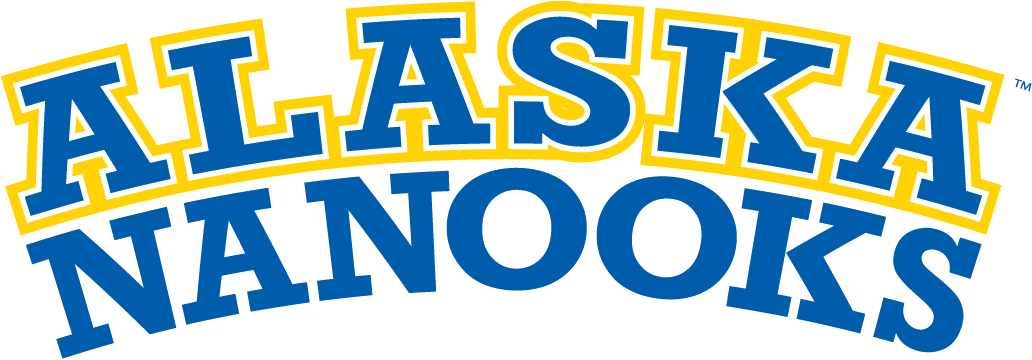
- Conference: 7th WCHA
- Home ice: Carlson Center

Rankings
- USCHO.com: NR
- USA Today: NR

Record
- Overall: 12–21–3
- Conference: 12–14–2
- Home: 6–10–0
- Road: 6–11–3

Coaches and captains
- Head coach: Erik Largen
- Assistant coaches: Joe Howe; Kārlis Zirnis; Dylan Blankenship; Ryan Reinheller
- Alternate captain(s): Ryker Leer; Kyle Marino

The 2018–19 Alaska Nanooks men's ice hockey season was the 70th season of play for the program, the 35th at the Division I level and the 6th in the WCHA conference. The Nanooks represented the University of Alaska Fairbanks and were coached by Erik Largen, in his 1st season.

== Season ==
After just one season with Lance West behind the bench, Alaska brought in Erik Largen as the program's 27th head coach. The Nanooks had trouble finding their game early in the season under their new leader and began 0–7–1. While some of the struggles were caused by a difficult schedule (6 games came against ranked opponents), Alaska's offense was paltry in those matches. The team averages less than 2 goals per game and were shut out on three occasions.

The team improved in November and saw some modest gains in their scoring production. Freshman goalie, Gustavs Dāvis Grigals, also got a turn in net and helped propel Alaska to four wins over a four-week span. While it looked like the team may be rounding a corner, both Grigals and nominal starter Anton Martinsson struggled as the calendar turned to January and the Nanooks ended up with a 5-game losing streak.

Martinsson recovered first and helped the team right the ship down the stretch. Alaska showed some grit with wins over Bowling Green and Minnesota State when both were ranked in the top-10. The Nanooks were also able to take three out of four games from Alaska Anchorage to claim their seventh straight Governor's Cup.

In the WCHA Tournament, Alaska continued to show improvement when they fought hard against 2nd seed, Northern Michigan. The team took a 4–2 lead into the third period but couldn't stop the Wildcats from tying the game in the waning seconds. The Nanooks fought hard in the overtime, firing 14 shots on goal in just over 30 minutes, but they couldn't solve Atte Tolvanen. While NMU won the game, the team didn't fold and continued to press in the second game. Alaska got out to a 2–0 lead by the midpoint of the game but again could not hold the lead and surrendered 4 goals over a 20-minute span. Tyler Cline scored with Martinsson on the bench to close the gap to 1 but the Nanooks couldn't get the tying marker and saw their season slip away despite a gutsy performance.

== Departures ==
Player	Position	Nationality	Cause
Kyle Froese	Defenseman	United States	Transferred to Wisconsin–Eau Claire
Zach Frye	Defenseman	United States	Graduation (signed with San Jose Barracuda)
Ross Heidt	Forward	Canada	Transferred to Red Deer
Aaron Herdt	Forward	United States	Transferred to Concordia
Nick Hinz	Defenseman	United States	Graduation (retired)
Danny Kiraly	Defenseman	United States	Transferred to Wisconsin–Stevens Point
Tayler Munson	Forward	United States	Graduation (retired)
Austin Vieth	Forward	United States	Graduation (signed with Peoria Rivermen)
Justin Woods	Defenseman	United States	Graduation (signed with Jacksonville IceMen)

== Recruiting ==
Player	Position	Nationality	Age	Notes
Matthew Doran	Defenseman	United States	21	St. Louis, MO
Colin Doyle	Forward	Canada	20	Campbellford, ON
Chase Ellingson	Forward	United States	21	Blaine, MN
Jake Gresh	Defenseman	United States	20	Avon, CT
Gustavs Dāvis Grigals	Goaltender	Latvia	20	Riga, LAT
Caleb Hite	Forward	United States	21	Grand Blanc, MI
Chris Jandric	Defenseman	Canada	19	Prince George, BC
Jordan Muzzillo	Defenseman	United States	21	Capron, IL
Samuel Ruffin	Forward	United States	19	Westfield, IN
Antti Virtanen	Defenseman	Finland	20	Kittilä, FI

== Roster ==
No.	Nat.	Player	Class	Pos	Height	Weight	DoB	Hometown	Previous team	NHL rights
1	(United States)	Niko Della Maggiore	Junior	G	5' 10" (1.78 m)	201 lb (91 kg)	1995-04-01	Gilroy, California	Springfield Jr. Blues (NAHL)	—
2	(United States)	Jack Weiss	Junior (RS)	D	5' 11" (1.8 m)	185 lb (84 kg)	1994-05-30	Bloomington, Minnesota	Rio Grande Valley Killer Bees (NAHL)	—
5	(Canada)	Nikolas Koberstein	Senior	D	6' 2" (1.88 m)	185 lb (84 kg)	1996-01-19	Barrhead, Alberta	Bloomington Thunder (USHL)	MTL, 125th overall 2014
6	(United States)	Matthew Doran	Freshman	D	6' 1" (1.85 m)	201 lb (91 kg)	1997-04-28	St. Louis, Missouri	Victoria Grizzlies (BCHL)	—
8	(United States)	Jordan Muzzillo	Freshman	D	6' 0" (1.83 m)	185 lb (84 kg)	1997-03-24	Capron, Illinois	Springfield Jr. Blues (NAHL)	—
9	(Canada)	Justin Young	Sophomore	F	6' 0" (1.83 m)	184 lb (83 kg)	1997-12-23	Leduc, Alberta	Whitecourt Wolverines (AJHL)	—
10	(United States)	Chase Ellingson	Freshman	F	5' 7" (1.7 m)	172 lb (78 kg)	1997-09-02	Blaine, Minnesota	Des Moines Buccaneers (USHL)	—
11	(Canada)	Steven Jandric	Sophomore	F	6' 0" (1.83 m)	200 lb (91 kg)	1997-08-18	Prince George, British Columbia	Vernon Vipers (BCHL)	—
12	(United States)	Caleb Hite	Freshman	F	5' 11" (1.8 m)	185 lb (84 kg)	1997-02-11	Grand Blanc, Michigan	Fairbanks Ice Dogs (NAHL)	—
13	(United States)	Jake Gresh	Freshman	D	5' 11" (1.8 m)	194 lb (88 kg)	1998-02-01	Avon, Connecticut	Chilliwack Chiefs (BCHL)	—
14	(United States)	Brennan Blaszczak	Sophomore	F	6' 0" (1.83 m)	180 lb (82 kg)	1996-03-12	Troy, Michigan	Springfield Jr. Blues (NAHL)	—
15	(Canada)	Troy Van Tetering	Junior	F	5' 11" (1.8 m)	180 lb (82 kg)	1997-04-26	Carstairs, Alberta	Lloydminster Bobcats (AJHL)	—
16	(United States)	Samuel Ruffin	Freshman	F	5' 9" (1.75 m)	176 lb (80 kg)	1998-10-29	Westfield, Indiana	Fairbanks Ice Dogs (NAHL)	—
17	(Canada)	Colin Doyle	Freshman	F	5' 10" (1.78 m)	185 lb (84 kg)	1998-05-12	Campbellford, Ontario	Wellington Dukes (OJHL)	—
20	(Canada)	Max Newton	Sophomore	F	5' 10" (1.78 m)	185 lb (84 kg)	1997-11-14	Vancouver, British Columbia	Cowichan Valley Capitals (BCHL)	—
22	(United States)	Chad Staley	Senior	F	5' 9" (1.75 m)	181 lb (82 kg)	1994-06-29	Kennewick, Washington	Prince George Spruce Kings (BCHL)	—
23	(Canada)	Ryker Leer (A)	Senior	F	5' 11" (1.8 m)	192 lb (87 kg)	1995-12-05	Red Deer, Alberta	Camrose Kodiaks (AJHL)	—
24	(United States)	James LaDouce	Junior	F	5' 11" (1.8 m)	213 lb (97 kg)	1995-08-24	Saginaw, Michigan	Minot Minotauros (NAHL)	—
25	(Finland)	Antti Virtanen	Freshman	F	6' 0" (1.83 m)	185 lb (84 kg)	1998-03-14	Kittilä, Finland	Sioux Falls Stampede (USHL)	—
26	(United States)	Tyler Cline	Junior	F	5' 7" (1.7 m)	175 lb (79 kg)	1995-09-03	Blaine, Minnesota	Minnesota Wilderness (NAHL)	—
27	(Canada)	Colton Leiter	Junior	F	6' 2" (1.88 m)	200 lb (91 kg)	1996-01-16	Edmonton, Alberta	Spruce Grove Saints (AJHL)	—
28	(Canada)	Kylar Hope	Junior	F	5' 11" (1.8 m)	185 lb (84 kg)	1995-08-17	Lashburn, Saskatchewan	West Kelowna Warriors (BCHL)	—
29	(Canada)	Chris Jandric	Freshman	D	5' 11" (1.8 m)	179 lb (81 kg)	1998-10-03	Prince George, British Columbia	Vernon Vipers (BCHL)	—
30	(Latvia)	Gustavs Dāvis Grigals	Freshman	G	6' 2" (1.88 m)	189 lb (86 kg)	1998-07-22	Riga, Latvia	Shreveport Mudbugs (NAHL)	—
32	(Canada)	Tristan Thompson	Junior	D	5' 9" (1.75 m)	185 lb (84 kg)	1997-01-02	Canmore, Alberta	Brooks Bandits (AJHL)	—
33	(Sweden)	Anton Martinsson	Junior	G	6' 1" (1.85 m)	178 lb (81 kg)	1995-12-11	Klippan, Sweden	Amarillo Bulls (NAHL)	—
35	(United States)	Tony Rehm	Sophomore	G	6' 1" (1.85 m)	185 lb (84 kg)	1997-06-29	Madison, Wisconsin	Victoria Grizzlies (BCHL)	—
36	(Canada)	Kyle Marino (A)	Junior	F	6' 3" (1.91 m)	220 lb (100 kg)	1995-06-01	Niagara Falls, Ontario	West Kelowna Warriors (BCHL)	—

== Standings ==
2018–19 Western Collegiate Hockey Association Standings
	Conference record								Overall record					
	GP	W	L	T	3/SW	PTS	GF	GA	GP	W	L	T	GF	GA
#6 Minnesota State †*	28	22	5	1	1	68	99	43	42	32	8	2	147	76
Northern Michigan	28	18	8	2	0	56	82	57	39	21	16	2	104	96
#13 Bowling Green	28	16	8	4	3	55	77	52	41	25	11	5	133	75
Lake Superior State	28	16	10	2	0	50	91	69	38	23	13	2	123	93
Bemidji State	28	13	11	4	2	45	71	63	38	15	17	6	95	94
Michigan Tech	28	13	12	3	1	43	68	63	38	14	20	4	90	101
Alaska	28	12	14	2	2	40	57	81	36	12	21	3	72	114
Alabama–Huntsville	28	8	18	2	2	28	61	93	38	8	28	2	67	129
Ferris State	28	7	18	3	0	24	68	96	36	10	23	3	90	123
Alaska Anchorage	28	2	23	3	2	11	29	86	34	3	28	3	40	115
Championship: March 23, 2019 † indicates conference regular season champion (MacNaughton Cup) * indicates conference tournament champion (Broadmoor Trophy); Rankings: USCHO.com Top 20 Poll

== Schedule and results ==
Date	Time	Opponent^{#}	Rank^{#}	Site	TV	Decision	Result	Attendance	Record
Exhibition
September 29	7:07 PM	vs. Simon Fraser*		Carlson Center • Fairbanks, Alaska		Martinsson	W 13–1	1,995	
Regular season
October 6	5:05 PM	at Arizona State*		Oceanside Ice Arena • Tempe, Arizona		Martinsson	L 0–3	644	0–1–0
October 7	1:00 PM	at Arizona State*		Oceanside Ice Arena • Tempe, Arizona		Martinsson	L 0–5	921	0–2–0
October 12	7:07 PM	vs. #5 St. Cloud State*		Carlson Center • Fairbanks, Alaska		Martinsson	L 2–3	1,308	0–3–0
October 13	7:07 PM	vs. #5 St. Cloud State*		Carlson Center • Fairbanks, Alaska		Grigals	L 2–6	1,646	0–4–0
October 19	5:05 PM	at #9 Denver*		Magness Arena • Denver, Colorado	Altitude	Martinsson	L 1–4	4,363	0–5–0
October 20	5:05 PM	at #9 Denver*		Magness Arena • Denver, Colorado	Altitude2	Martinsson	T 3–3 ^{OT}	4,316	0–5–1
October 26	4:07 PM	at #7 Minnesota State		Verizon Wireless Center • Mankato, Minnesota		Martinsson	L 0–4	3,913	0–6–1 (0–1–0)
October 27	4:07 PM	at #7 Minnesota State		Verizon Wireless Center • Mankato, Minnesota		Martinsson	L 1–3	4,136	0–7–1 (0–2–0)
November 9	3:07 PM	at Lake Superior State		Taffy Abel Arena • Sault Ste. Marie, Michigan		Martinsson	T 3–3 ^{OT}	1,087	0–7–2 (0–2–1)
November 10	3:07 PM	at Lake Superior State		Taffy Abel Arena • Sault Ste. Marie, Michigan		Grigals	W 4–3	1,860	1–7–2 (1–2–1)
November 16	7:07 PM	vs. Alabama–Huntsville		Carlson Center • Fairbanks, Alaska		Martinsson	L 4–3	1,826	1–8–2 (1–3–1)
November 17	7:07 PM	vs. Alabama–Huntsville		Carlson Center • Fairbanks, Alaska		Grigals	W 2–1	1,928	2–8–2 (2–3–1)
November 23	3:07 PM	at Michigan Tech		MacInnes Student Ice Arena • Houghton, Michigan		Grigals	L 1–2	2,605	2–9–2 (2–4–1)
November 24	3:07 PM	at Michigan Tech		MacInnes Student Ice Arena • Houghton, Michigan		Martinsson	L 2–7	2,218	2–10–2 (2–5–1)
November 30	7:07 PM	vs. Ferris State		Carlson Center • Fairbanks, Alaska		Grigals	W 4–3 ^{OT}	1,562	3–10–2 (3–5–1)
December 1	7:07 PM	vs. Ferris State		Carlson Center • Fairbanks, Alaska		Grigals	W 6–2	1,723	4–10–2 (4–5–1)
December 7	7:00 PM	vs. Lake Superior State		Carlson Center • Fairbanks, Alaska		Grigals	L 1–4	1,694	4–11–2 (4–6–1)
December 8	7:07 PM	vs. Lake Superior State		Carlson Center • Fairbanks, Alaska		Martinsson	L 2–5	2,007	4–12–2 (4–7–1)
January 4	7:07 PM	vs. Northern Michigan		Carlson Center • Fairbanks, Alaska		Grigals	L 0–4	1,753	4–13–2 (4–8–1)
January 5	7:07 PM	vs. Northern Michigan		Carlson Center • Fairbanks, Alaska		Martinsson	L 2–4	1,923	4–14–2 (4–9–1)
January 11	4:07 PM	at Bemidji State		Sanford Center • Bemidji, Minnesota		Martinsson	L 0–3	2,798	4–15–2 (4–10–1)
January 12	2:07 PM	at Bemidji State		Sanford Center • Bemidji, Minnesota		Martinsson	W 2–1 ^{OT}	3,016	5–15–2 (5–10–1)
January 18	7:07 PM	vs. #9 Bowling Green		Carlson Center • Fairbanks, Alaska		Martinsson	W 4–1	1,327	6–15–2 (6–10–1)
January 19	7:07 PM	vs. #9 Bowling Green		Carlson Center • Fairbanks, Alaska		Martinsson	L 0–2	1,823	6–16–2 (6–11–1)
January 25	4:12 PM	at Alabama–Huntsville		Von Braun Center • Huntsville, Alabama		Martinsson	W 3–1	2,440	7–16–2 (7–11–1)
January 26	7:07 PM	at Alabama–Huntsville		Von Braun Center • Huntsville, Alabama		Martinsson	W 5–2	1,844	8–16–2 (8–11–1)
February 8	7:07 PM	vs. Alaska Anchorage		Carlson Center • Fairbanks, Alaska (Governor's Cup)		Martinsson	L 1–4	2,220	8–17–2 (8–12–1)
February 9	7:07 PM	vs. Alaska Anchorage		Carlson Center • Fairbanks, Alaska (Governor's Cup)		Grigals	W 2–1	2,468	9–17–2 (9–12–1)
February 15	3:37 PM	at #16 Bowling Green		Slater Family Ice Arena • Bowling Green, Ohio		Grigals	L 0–8	2,744	9–18–2 (9–13–1)
February 16	3:07 PM	at #16 Bowling Green		Slater Family Ice Arena • Bowling Green, Ohio		Grigals	T 3–3 ^{OT}	4,252	9–18–3 (9–13–2)
February 22	7:07 PM	vs. #4 Minnesota State		Carlson Center • Fairbanks, Alaska		Grigals	L 1–6	1,946	9–19–3 (9–14–2)
February 23	7:07 PM	vs. #4 Minnesota State		Carlson Center • Fairbanks, Alaska		Martinsson	W 1–0	2,435	10–19–3 (10–14–2)
March 1	7:07 PM	at Alaska Anchorage		Sullivan Arena • Anchorage, Alaska (Governor's Cup)		Martinsson	W 4–0	3,009	11–19–3 (11–14–2)
March 2	7:07 PM	at Alaska Anchorage		Sullivan Arena • Anchorage, Alaska (Governor's Cup)		Martinsson	W 2–1	3,429	12–19–3 (12–14–2)
WCHA Tournament
March 8	3:07 PM	at Northern Michigan*		Berry Events Center • Marquette, Michigan (WCHA Quarterfinals game 1)		Martinsson	L 4–5 ^{2OT}	2,326	12–20–3
March 9	3:07 PM	at Northern Michigan*		Berry Events Center • Marquette, Michigan (WCHA Quarterfinals game 2)		Martinsson	L 3–4	2,960	12–21–3
Alaska Lost Series 0–2
*Non-conference game. ^{#}Rankings from USCHO.com Poll. All times are in Alaska Time. Source:

== Scoring statistics ==
Name	Position	Games	Goals	Assists	Points	PIM
Steven Jandric	LW	36	9	15	24	71
Tristan Thompson	D	35	6	14	20	40
Kylar Hope	F	36	8	11	19	46
Colton Leiter	C	36	6	10	16	36
Chris Jandric	LW	28	3	12	15	42
Max Newton	F	32	8	3	11	16
Tyler Cline	C/LW	33	6	5	11	40
Kyle Marino	C/D	35	6	5	11	64
Chad Staley	C	33	2	9	11	6
Nikolas Koberstein	D	35	0	10	10	60
Ryker Leer	LW	36	6	2	8	30
Samuel Ruffin	F	29	0	8	8	31
Troy Van Tetering	LW	33	5	1	6	6
Antti Virtanen	D	34	1	5	6	42
James LaDouce	D	36	1	5	6	24
Justin Young	C	33	2	3	5	14
Colin Doyle	C	26	0	4	4	54
Brennan Blaszczak	F	16	1	2	3	0
Chase Ellingson	C/RW	19	1	1	2	6
Anton Martinsson	G	25	0	2	2	8
Jake Gresh	D	11	1	0	1	2
Matthew Doran	D	12	0	1	1	4
Jordan Muzzillo	D	13	0	1	1	2
Jack Weiss	G	28	0	1	1	41
Niko Della Maggiore	G	1	0	0	0	0
Gustavs Dāvis Grigals	G	14	0	0	0	0
Caleb Hite	F	19	0	0	0	2
Bench	-	-	-	-	-	12
Total			72	130	202	699

== Goaltending statistics ==
Name	Games	Minutes	Wins	Losses	Ties	Goals against	Saves	Shut outs	SV %	GAA
Niko Della Maggiore	1	32	0	0	0	0	5	0	1.000	0.00
Anton Martinsson	25	1410	7	15	2	64	648	2	.910	2.72
Gustavs Dāvis Grigals	14	739	5	6	1	41	367	0	.900	3.33
Empty Net	-	24	-	-	-	9	-	-	-	-
Total	36	2206	12	21	3	114	1020	2	.899	3.10

== Rankings ==
Poll	Week																										
Poll	Pre	1	2	3	4	5	6	7	8	9	10	11	12	13	14	15	16	17	18	19	20	21	22	23	24	25	26 (Final)
USCHO.com	NR	NR	NR	NR	NR	NR	NR	NR	NR	NR	NR	NR	NR	NR	NR	NR	NR	NR	NR	NR	NR	NR	NR	NR	NR	-	NR
USA Today	NR	NR	NR	NR	NR	NR	NR	NR	NR	NR	NR	NR	NR	NR	NR	NR	NR	NR	NR	NR	NR	NR	NR	NR	NR	NR	NR

USCHO did not release a poll in Week 25.

== Awards and honors ==
Player	Award	Ref
Steven Jandric	All-WCHA Third Team	
Chris Jandric	WCHA All-Rookie Team	
