= 2018–19 Alabama–Huntsville Chargers men's ice hockey season =

- Conference: 8th WCHA

Rankings
- USCHO.com: NR
- USA Today/ US Hockey Magazine: NR

Record
- Overall: 8–28–2
- Conference: 8–18–2–2
- Home: 3–12–1
- Road: 5–15–1
- Neutral: 0–1–0

Coaches and captains
- Head coach: Mike Corbett
- Assistant coaches: Gavin Morgan; Lance West

The 2018–19 Alabama–Huntsville Chargers ice hockey team represented the University of Alabama in Huntsville in the 2018–19 NCAA Division I men's ice hockey season. The Chargers were coached by Mike Corbett who was in his sixth season as head coach. His assistant coaches were Gavin Morgan and Lance West. The Chargers played their home games in the Propst Arena at the Von Braun Center and competed in the Western Collegiate Hockey Association.

== Recruiting ==
UAH added 8 freshmen and 2 transfers for the 2018–19 season, including 1 goalie, 5 forwards and 4 defenseman.

Player	Position	Nationality	Notes
Ben Allen	Forward	United States	Allen, Texas; 2016–17 SJHL All-Rookie Team and champion with the Battlefords North Stars
Simon Chen	Defenseman	China	Beijing, China
Dayne Finnson	Defenseman	Canada	Arborg, Manitoba; Former Victoria Grizzlies alternate captain
Jack Jeffers	Forward	Canada	Oakville, Ontario; 2017–18 Second Team All-OJHL playing for the Markham Royals
Drew Lennon	Defenseman	United States	Bloomington, Illinois
Bauer Neudecker	Forward	United States	St. Louis Park, Minnesota; former St. Louis Park High School captain
Bailey Newton	Defenseman	Canada	Oakville, Ontario; former Oakville Blades captain
Jesper Öhrvall	Forward	Sweden	Halmstad, Sweden; Spent last 3 seasons at RPI, 2012–13 and 2013–14 J20 SuperElit champion with HV71
Jake Theut	Goalie	United States	Washington, Michigan; played at Northeastern from 2014–2018, won Hockey East championship with Northeastern in 2015–16, 2013–14 EHL Goaltender of the Year and First Team All-Star with the New Hampshire Jr. Monarchs
Tyr Thompson	Forward	Canada	Whitecourt, Alberta

== Roster ==
=== Departures from 2017–18 team ===
- Richard Buri, D, graduated
- Cody Champagne, D, graduated
- Josh Kestner, F, graduated, signed with the Toronto Marlies (AHL)
- Jordan Larson, F, transferred to Lakehead University (U Sports)
- Max McHugh, F, graduated
- Brandon Parker, D, graduated
- Tyler Poulsen, F, signed with the Allen Americans (ECHL)
- Brennan Saulnier, F, graduated, signed with the Florida Everblades (ECHL)
- Jordan Uhelski, G, graduated, transferred to Miami (OH)

=== 2018–19 team ===
No.	Nat.	Player	Class	Pos	Height	Weight	DoB	Hometown	Previous team
1		Jake Theut	Senior	G	6' 3" (1.91 m)	190 lb (86 kg)	1993-10-01	Washington, Michigan	Northeastern (HEA)
2		Cam Knight	Senior	D	6' 1" (1.85 m)	195 lb (88 kg)	1995-01-10	North Reading, Massachusetts	Wichita Falls (NAHL)
3		Drew Lennon	Freshman	D	6' 2" (1.88 m)	185 lb (84 kg)	1998-01-12	Bloomington, Illinois	Lone Star (NAHL)
4		Connor James	Junior	D	5' 9" (1.75 m)	170 lb (77 kg)	1996-10-11	Wainwright, Alberta	Spruce Grove (AJHL)
5		Simon Chen	Freshman	D	5' 10" (1.78 m)	180 lb (82 kg)	1997-06-26	Beijing, China	Cowichan Valley (BCHL)
6		Sean Rappleyea	Junior	D	5' 11" (1.8 m)	175 lb (79 kg)	1995-02-03	Sayreville, New Jersey	Ottawa (CCHL)
7		Bauer Neudecker	Freshman	F	5' 8" (1.73 m)	165 lb (75 kg)	1998-06-01	St. Louis Park, Minnesota	Sioux City (USHL)
8		John Teets (A)	Senior	D	6' 3" (1.91 m)	205 lb (93 kg)	1994-08-10	Fairbanks, Alaska	Fairbanks (NAHL)
9		Christian Rajic	Sophomore	F	5' 10" (1.78 m)	165 lb (75 kg)	1997-02-06	Oakville, Ontario	Oakville (OJHL)
10		Andrew Dodson	Sophomore	F	5' 9" (1.75 m)	180 lb (82 kg)	1996-10-24	Milton, Ontario	Carleton Place (CCHL)
11		Jesper Öhrvall	Senior	F	5' 8" (1.73 m)	165 lb (75 kg)	1994-11-19	Halmstad, Sweden	RPI (ECAC)
12		Connor Merkley	Sophomore	F	6' 1" (1.85 m)	190 lb (86 kg)	1996-09-03	Portland, Ontario	Carleton Place (CCHL)
13		Ben Allen	Freshman	F	5' 9" (1.75 m)	175 lb (79 kg)	1997-07-31	Allen, Texas	Melfort (SJHL)
14		Madison Dunn (A)	Senior	F	5' 8" (1.73 m)	165 lb (75 kg)	1995-10-04	Calgary, Alberta	Brooks (AJHL)
15		Hans Gorowsky (C)	Senior	F	5' 10" (1.78 m)	180 lb (82 kg)	1994-12-20	Lino Lakes, Minnesota	Fairbanks (NAHL)
16		Connor Wood	Sophomore	F	5' 8" (1.73 m)	180 lb (82 kg)	1996-08-09	Buford, Georgia	Odessa (NAHL)
18		Austin Beaulieu	Junior	F	5' 9" (1.75 m)	170 lb (77 kg)	1996-10-21	Coral Springs, Florida	Wichita Falls (CCHL)
19		Brandon Salerno	Junior	F	5' 8" (1.73 m)	155 lb (70 kg)	1995-07-31	Toronto, Ontario	Pickering (OJHL)
20		Bailey Newton	Freshman	D	5' 10" (1.78 m)	180 lb (82 kg)	1998-05-14	Oakville, Ontario	Oakville (OJHL)
21		Levi Wunder	Sophomore	F	5' 9" (1.75 m)	165 lb (75 kg)	1996-10-11	Escanaba, Michigan	Odessa (NAHL)
22		Dayne Finnson	Freshman	D	5' 10" (1.78 m)	175 lb (79 kg)	1997-10-01	Arborg, Manitoba	Victoria (BCHL)
24		Tyr Thompson	Freshman	F	6' 0" (1.83 m)	180 lb (82 kg)	1998-09-26	Whitecourt, Alberta	Whitecourt (AJHL)
25		Adam Wilcox	Senior	F	6' 1" (1.85 m)	210 lb (95 kg)	1994-04-25	Alpharetta, Georgia	Fairbanks (NAHL)
26		Jack Jeffers	Freshman	F	6' 0" (1.83 m)	170 lb (77 kg)	1997-09-21	Oakville, Ontario	Markham (OJHL)
27		Teddy Rotenberger	Sophomore	D	5' 11" (1.8 m)	180 lb (82 kg)	1996-01-01	Huntsville, Alabama	Shreveport (NAHL)
28		Kurt Gosselin (C)	Senior	D	6' 1" (1.85 m)	200 lb (91 kg)	1994-11-30	Brighton, Michigan	Alberni Valley (BCHL)
30		Mark Sinclair	Sophomore	G	5' 11" (1.8 m)	170 lb (77 kg)	1996-03-08	Dundas, Ontario	Chilliwack (BCHL)
35		Josh Astorino	Sophomore	G	6' 2" (1.88 m)	176 lb (80 kg)	1996-12-09	Niagara Falls, Ontario	Georgetown (OJHL)

== Schedule and results ==
- Green background indicates win.
- Red background indicates loss.
- Yellow background indicates tie.

Date	Time	Opponent	Site	Decision	Result	Attendance	Record
Regular Season
October 6	6:05 pm	at Miami*	Steve Cady Arena • Oxford, Ohio	Sinclair	L 1–5	2,702	0–1–0
October 7	2:00 pm	at Miami*	Steve Cady Arena • Oxford, Ohio	Theut	L 0–4	1,431	0–2–0
October 12	8:30 pm	at Colorado College*	Colorado Springs World Arena • Colorado Springs, Colorado	Sinclair	L 0–1	3,164	0–3–0
October 13	8:07 pm	at #10 Denver*	Magness Arena • Denver, Colorado	Theut	L 0–6	6,381	0–4–0
October 19	7:07 pm	Arizona State*	Von Braun Center • Huntsville, Alabama	Sinclair	L 1–2	2,138	0–5–0
October 20	7:07 pm	Arizona State*	Von Braun Center • Huntsville, Alabama	Theut	L 1–5	2,071	0–6–0
October 26	7:07 pm	Lake Superior	Von Braun Center • Huntsville, Alabama	Sinclair	L 3–4	1,629	0–7–0 (0–1–0)
October 27	7:07 pm	Lake Superior	Von Braun Center • Huntsville, Alabama	Sinclair	L 1–2	3,083	0–8–0 (0–2–0)
November 2	7:07 pm	Michigan Tech	Von Braun Center • Huntsville, Alabama	Sinclair	L 1–2	1,279	0–9–0 (0–3–0)
November 3	7:07 pm	Michigan Tech	Von Braun Center • Huntsville, Alabama	Sinclair	L 1–4	1,091	0–10–0 (0–4–0)
November 16	10:07 pm	at Alaska	Carlson Center • Fairbanks, Alaska	Sinclair	W 3–1	1,826	1–10–0 (1–4–0)
November 17	10:07 pm	at Alaska	Carlson Center • Fairbanks, Alaska	Theut	L 1–2	1,928	1–11–0 (1–5–0)
December 1	6:07 pm	#12 Bowling Green	Von Braun Center • Huntsville, Alabama	Sinclair	L 2–6	1,041	1–12–0 (1–6–0)
December 2	3:07 pm	#12 Bowling Green	Von Braun Center • Huntsville, Alabama	Theut	L 1–2	1,007	1–13–0 (1–7–0)
December 7	7:07 pm	at Bemidji State	Sanford Center • Bemidji, Minnesota	Sinclair	L 0–4	2,755	1–14–0 (1–8–0)
December 8	7:07 pm	at Bemidji State	Sanford Center • Bemidji, Minnesota	Theut	W 4–2	2,978	2–14–0 (2–8–0)
December 14	6:07 pm	at Michigan Tech	MacInnes Student Ice Arena • Houghton, Michigan	Sinclair	W 1–0	2,411	3–14–0 (3–8–0)
December 15	6:07 pm	at Michigan Tech	MacInnes Student Ice Arena • Houghton, Michigan	Sinclair	L 1–2 ^{OT}	3,025	3–15–0 (3–9–0)
December 28	6:05 pm	at Vermont*	Gutterson Fieldhouse • Burlington, Vermont (Catamount Cup)	Sinclair	L 1–4	3,405	3–16–0 (3–9–0)
December 29	3:00 pm	vs. #11 Northeastern*	Gutterson Fieldhouse • Burlington, Vermont (Catamount Cup)	Theut	L 0–2	3,639	12–3–1 (6–1–1)
January 4	7:07 pm	Ferris State	Von Braun Center • Huntsville, Alabama	Sinclair	L 5–6 ^{OT}	1,247	3–18–0 (3–10–0)
January 5	7:07 pm	Ferris State	Von Braun Center • Huntsville, Alabama	Theut	W 4–3 ^{OT}	1,308	4–18–0 (4–10–0)
January 11	6:07 pm	at #18 Lake Superior	Taffy Abel Arena • Sault Ste. Marie, Michigan	Theut	L 2–7	2,025	4–19–0 (4–11–0)
January 12	6:07 pm	at #18 Lake Superior	Taffy Abel Arena • Sault Ste. Marie, Michigan	Sinclair	T 1–1 ^{SOW}	2,173	4–19–1 (4–11–1)
January 18	7:07 pm	Alaska Anchorage	Von Braun Center • Huntsville, Alabama	Sinclair	W 6–2	1,708	5–19–1 (5–11–1)
January 19	3:07 pm	Alaska Anchorage	Von Braun Center • Huntsville, Alabama	Sinclair	W 6–3	1,109	6–19–1 (6–11–1)
January 25	7:07 pm	Alaska	Von Braun Center • Huntsville, Alabama	Sinclair	L 1–3	2,440	6–20–1 (6–12–1)
January 26	7:07 pm	Alaska	Von Braun Center • Huntsville, Alabama	Sinclair	L 2–5	1,844	6–21–1 (6–13–1)
February 1	7:07 pm	at #6 Minnesota State	Verizon Wireless Center • Mankato, Minnesota	Theut	L 1–6	3,985	6–22–1 (6–14–1)
February 2	7:07 pm	at #6 Minnesota State	Verizon Wireless Center • Mankato, Minnesota	Sinclair	L 0–4	4,564	6–23–1 (6–15–1)
February 8	6:07 pm	Northern Michigan	Von Braun Center • Huntsville, Alabama	Sinclair	T 2–2 ^{SOW}	1,357	6–23–2 (6–15–2)
February 9	3:37 pm	Northern Michigan	Von Braun Center • Huntsville, Alabama	Theut	L 3–6	1,432	6–24–2 (6–16–2)
February 22	6:07 pm	at Ferris State	Ewigleben Arena • Big Rapids, Michigan	Sinclair	W 2–0	1,354	7–24–2 (7–16–2)
February 23	6:07 pm	at Ferris State	Ewigleben Arena • Big Rapids, Michigan	Sinclair	L 2–5	1,684	7–25–2 (7–17–2)
March 1	7:07 pm	at #15 Bowling Green	Slater Family Ice Arena • Bowling Green, Ohio	Sinclair	W 4–2	3,088	8–25–2 (8–17–2)
March 2	6:07 pm	at #15 Bowling Green	Slater Family Ice Arena • Bowling Green, Ohio	Theut	L 1–7	3,818	8–26–2 (8–18–2)
WCHA Tournament
March 8	7:07 pm	at #4 Minnesota State	Verizon Wireless Center • Mankato, Minnesota (WCHA First Round)	Sinclair	L 1–3	2,967	8–27–2 (8–18–2)
March 9	4:07 pm	at #4 Minnesota State	Verizon Wireless Center • Mankato, Minnesota (WCHA First Round)	Sinclair	L 1–4	2,479	8–28–2 (8–18–2)
*Non-conference game. ^{#}Rankings from USCHO.com Poll. All times are in Central Time. Source:

=== Standings ===
2018–19 Western Collegiate Hockey Association Standings
	Conference record								Overall record					
	GP	W	L	T	3/SW	PTS	GF	GA	GP	W	L	T	GF	GA
#6 Minnesota State †*	28	22	5	1	1	68	99	43	42	32	8	2	147	76
Northern Michigan	28	18	8	2	0	56	82	57	39	21	16	2	104	96
#13 Bowling Green	28	16	8	4	3	55	77	52	41	25	11	5	133	75
Lake Superior State	28	16	10	2	0	50	91	69	38	23	13	2	123	93
Bemidji State	28	13	11	4	2	45	71	63	38	15	17	6	95	94
Michigan Tech	28	13	12	3	1	43	68	63	38	14	20	4	90	101
Alaska	28	12	14	2	2	40	57	81	36	12	21	3	72	114
Alabama–Huntsville	28	8	18	2	2	28	61	93	38	8	28	2	67	129
Ferris State	28	7	18	3	0	24	68	96	36	10	23	3	90	123
Alaska Anchorage	28	2	23	3	2	11	29	86	34	3	28	3	40	115
Championship: March 23, 2019 † indicates conference regular season champion (MacNaughton Cup) * indicates conference tournament champion (Broadmoor Trophy); Rankings: USCHO.com Top 20 Poll

== Player stats ==
As of March 9, 2019

=== Skaters ===
Player	Pos	Yr	GP	G	A	Pts	PIM	PPG	SHG	GWG
Hans Gorowsky	F	Sr	38	12	7	19	20	5	1	2
Kurt Gosselin	D	Sr	25	4	11	15	48	3	1	1
Bauer Neudecker	F	Fr	38	7	7	14	2	0	0	1
Jack Jeffers	F	Fr	38	7	7	14	44	0	0	0
Austin Beaulieu	F	Jr	38	5	9	14	22	2	0	1
Madison Dunn	F	Sr	38	4	10	14	16	2	0	0
Christian Rajic	F	So	34	3	11	14	22	2	0	0
Connor James	D	Jr	38	4	6	10	2	2	0	0
Jesper Öhrvall	F	Sr	32	2	8	10	14	0	0	0
Cam Knight	D	Sr	37	2	8	10	24	1	0	1
Brandon Salerno	F	Jr	38	5	3	8	12	0	0	0
Connor Merkley	F	So	37	3	4	7	22	0	0	0
Adam Wilcox	F	Sr	37	3	3	6	2	0	0	0
John Teets	D	Sr	38	0	6	6	20	0	0	0
Andrew Dodson	F	So	27	1	3	4	38	0	0	1
Connor Wood	F	So	27	2	1	3	23	0	0	0
Dayne Finnson	D	Fr	32	0	2	2	33	0	0	0
Bailey Newton	D	Fr	38	1	1	2	97	0	0	1
Drew Lennon	D	Fr	38	0	2	2	12	0	0	0
Ben Allen	F	Fr	9	1	0	1	0	0	0	0
Tyr Thompson	F	Fr	12	1	0	1	6	1	0	0
Jake Theut	G	Sr	12	0	1	1	2	0	0	0
Teddy Rotenberger	D	So	1	0	0	0	4	0	0	0
Sean Rappleyea	D	Jr	13	0	0	0	2	0	0	0
Levi Wunder	F	So	19	0	0	0	4	0	0	0
Mark Sinclair	G	So	28	0	0	0	0	0	0	0
Team			38	67	110	177	491	18	2	8

=== Goalies ===
Player	Yr	GP	TOI	W	L	T	GA	GAA	SV	SV%	SO
Mark Sinclair	So	28	1619:39	6	18	2	78	2.89	843	0.915	2
Jake Theut	Sr	12	655:11	2	10	0	46	4.21	386	0.894	0
