= Matt Curley =

American ice hockey player and coach

Current position
- Title: Associate Head Coach
- Team: Alaska
- Conference: Independent

Biographical details
- Born: January 17, 1983 (age 43); Madrid, New York, U.S.
- Education: Clarkson University (BA)

Playing career
- 2003–2007: Clarkson
- 2007–2008: Twin Cities Cyclones
- 2007–2008: Flint Generals
- 2007–2008: Huntsville Havoc
- 2008–2009: Reading Royals
- Position: Defenseman

Coaching career (HC unless noted)
- 2011: USA U18 (Asst.)
- 2012: USA U17 (Asst.)
- 2012–2013: Indiana Ice (asst.)
- 2013: USA U18 (Asst.)
- 2013–2015: Bentley (Asst.)
- 2015: USA U18 (Asst.)
- 2015–2016: RB Hockey Juniors
- 2016–2018: EC Red Bull Salzburg II
- 2018–2021: Alaska Anchorage
- 2021–2025: Des Moines Buccaneers
- 2025–present: Alaska

Head coaching record
- Overall: 7–53–10 (.171)

Matt Curley is an American ice hockey coach and former player. As of 2021, he is the head coach of the Des Moines Buccaneers in the United States Hockey League.

== Early life and education ==
Curley was born in Madrid, New York. He attended Clarkson University, 12 miles from his hometown, in the fall of 2003. He was a member of the first recruiting class for new head coach George Roll. While the team finished a disappointing ninth place in the conference, Clarkson achieved a runner-up finish in the ECAC tournament. After two middling seasons, Curley's senior year saw him named as an assistant captain for the team and the Golden Knights rocketed up the standings, finishing 2nd in the regular season but ending up as conference tournament champions. Clarkson received the #3 overall seed and was top ranked team in the East Regional bracket but in the opening game they drew Massachusetts and were unable to beat future NHL star Jonathan Quick once in over 67 minutes of playing time.

Curley graduated with a degree in history, law, business administration.

== Career ==
Curley spent the next season with three separate teams in two leagues. In 2008 and 2009, he moved up to the AHL and spent the whole season with the Reading Royals. After recording 7 points in 64 games Curley had had his fix of professional hockey and retired.

Curley returned to the game in 2011 as an assistant coach for the US Under-18 team at the world junior championships and helped the program win its third consecutive title. The following year, Curley was with the US Under-17 squad as an assistant at the 2012 World U-17 Hockey Challenge and helped the team to a runner-up finish.

The Indiana Ice named Curley as an associate head coach in 2012, but he continued to word with the US national junior team, acting as an assistant for the 2013 IIHF World U18 Championships that saw the US finish second behind the Connor McDavid-led Canada team. Curley's tenure in Indiana ended after one season when he accepted an assistant coaching post with Bentley and after a one-year hiatus he returned to the national program and helped team USA to its ninth tournament crown in 2015.

Curley headed overseas in 2015 to coach the RB Hockey Juniors, the junior affiliate for EC Red Bull Salzburg. After a year they promoted him to head coach for EC Red Bull Salzburg II, the team's minor affiliate in the newly created AlpsHL. After missing the playoffs the first year Curley led his team into the quarterfinals in 2018 but was on the move once more when he accepted the head coaching gig at Alaska Anchorage.

In 2021, he was named the head coach of the Des Moines Buccaneers in the United States Hockey League.

== College head coaching record ==
Record table
Season	Team	Overall	Conference	Standing	Postseason
Alaska Anchorage Seawolves (WCHA) (2018–2021)
2018–19	Alaska Anchorage	3–28–3	2–23–3–2	10th	
2019–20	Alaska Anchorage	4–25–7	4–18–6–3	8th	WCHA Quarterfinals
Alaska:		7–53–10	6–41–9		
Total:		7–53–10			
National champion Postseason invitational champion Conference regular season champion Conference regular season and conference tournament champion Division regular season champion Division regular season and conference tournament champion Conference tournament champion
