= 2018–19 NCAA Division I men's ice hockey season =

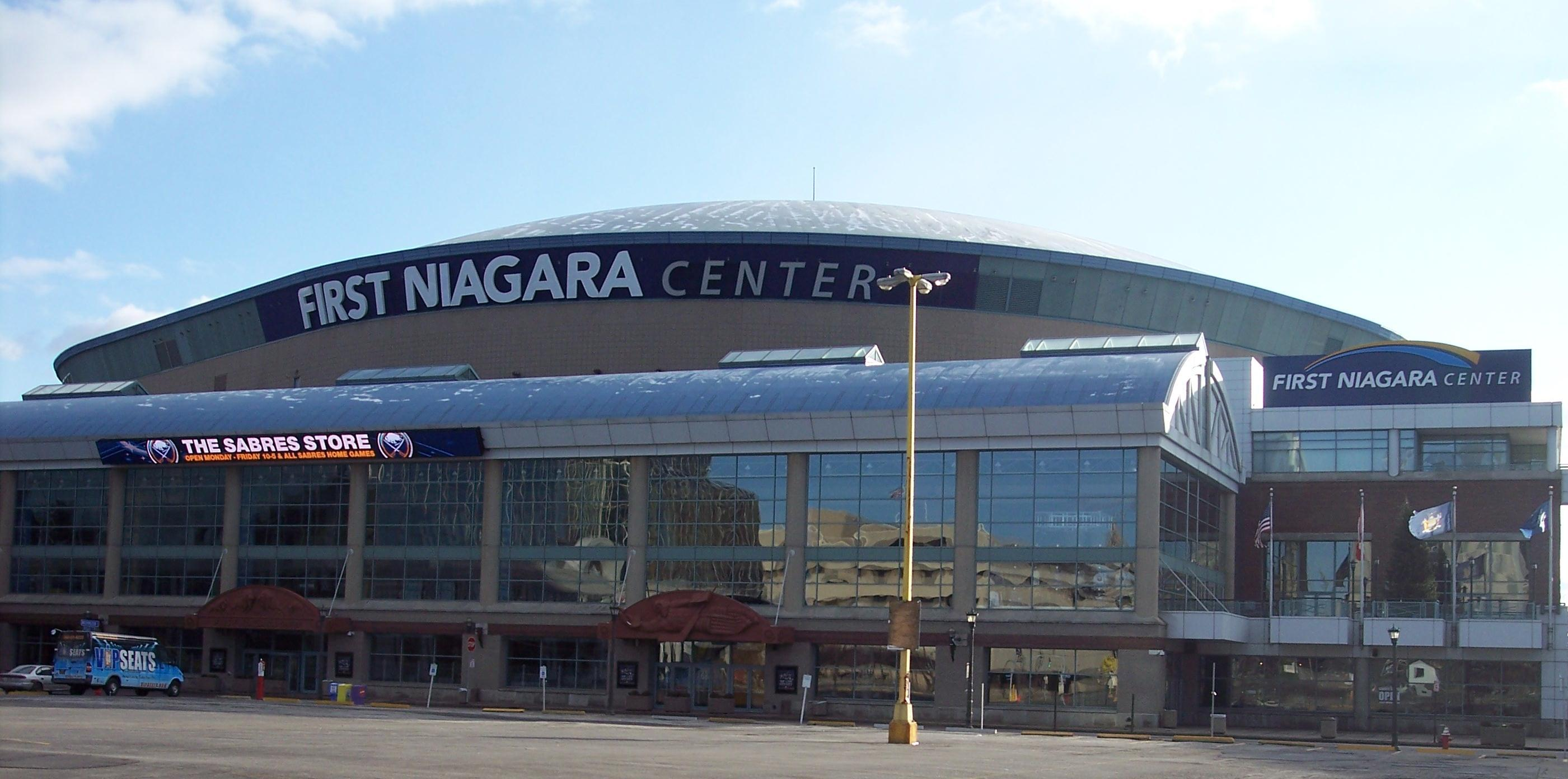
- The KeyBank Center in Buffalo, New York hosted the 2019 Frozen Four
- Duration: October 6, 2018– April 13, 2019
- NCAA tournament: 2019
- National championship: KeyBank Center; Buffalo, New York
- NCAA champion: Minnesota–Duluth
- Hobey Baker Award: Cale Makar (Massachusetts)

The 2018–19 NCAA Division I men's ice hockey season began in October 2018 and ended with the Frozen Four in April 2019. This was the 72nd season in which an NCAA ice hockey championship was held, and United States college ice hockey's 125th year overall.

== Regular season ==
=== Overtime rule changes ===
The NCAA Playing Rules Oversight Panel approved a proposal to allow conferences to use one of two alternative formats to award points in their league standings after the mandatory five-on-five, five-minute overtime period.

After a traditional five-minute, five-on-five overtime, conferences may use either a five-minute, three-on-three overtime period and a shootout or only a shootout to award additional conference points. Conferences are not required to use one of the alternative systems and may end play after the five-minute overtime.

During non-conference regular-season games, these alternative options are not permitted, and a game would end in a tie after the traditional five-minute overtime.

In regular-season tournaments that require advancement, a 20-minute sudden death format can be implemented for overtime, instead of the traditional five-minute overtime period. These tournaments also may use the three-on-three and shootout or the standalone shootout format.

Each conference's approach if no goal is scored in the initial five-minute overtime:

- Atlantic Hockey, ECAC & Hockey East: game ends in tie
- Big Ten, NCHC & WCHA: Five-minute, three-on-three overtime; if still tied a sudden-death shootout follows

Points Explanation:

- Atlantic Hockey, ECAC & Hockey East: Teams are awarded two points for each conference win in regulation or five-on-five overtime. Teams are awarded one point for a tie.
- Big Ten, NCHC & WCHA: Teams are awarded three points for each conference win in regulation or five-on-five overtime. A three-on-three overtime or shootout win is worth two points in the standings while the team that loses the three-on-three overtime/shootout receives just one point. The three-on-three overtime and shootouts only affect conference standings while the game is officially a tie for NCAA purposes.

=== Season tournaments ===
Tournament	Dates	Teams	Champion
IceBreaker Invitational	October 12–13	4	Notre Dame
Friendship Four	November 22–23	4	Union
Catamount Cup	December 28–29	4	Vermont
Desert Hockey Classic	December 28–29	4	Clarkson
Ledyard Bank Classic	December 29–30	4	Providence
Great Lakes Invitational	December 30–31	4	Lake Superior State
Fortress Invitational	January 4–5	4	Western Michigan
Three Rivers Classic	January 4–5	4	Brown
Beanpot	February 4, 11	4	Northeastern

=== Standings ===
- 2018–19 Atlantic Hockey Standings
  	Conference record							Overall record					
  	GP	W	L	T	PTS	GF	GA	GP	W	L	T	GF	GA
  #16 American International †*	28	18	9	1	37	102	77	41	23	17	1	129	119
  Bentley	28	15	9	4	34	94	75	37	17	15	5	113	98
  Air Force	28	14	10	4	32	65	63	36	16	15	5	90	92
  Sacred Heart	28	14	11	3	31	85	73	37	16	17	4	107	106
  RIT	28	13	11	4	30	81	76	38	17	17	4	113	111
  Niagara	28	11	12	5	27	94	96	41	17	19	5	127	140
  Mercyhurst	28	11	13	4	26	88	94	38	13	20	5	113	134
  Robert Morris	28	11	15	2	24	72	78	40	16	22	2	102	127
  Holy Cross	28	10	14	4	24	81	89	36	10	21	5	91	112
  Army	28	8	13	7	23	71	82	39	12	20	7	94	117
  Canisius	28	8	16	4	20	77	107	37	12	20	5	103	133
  Championship: March 23, 2019 † indicates conference regular season champion * indicates conference tournament champion (Riley Trophy); Rankings: USCHO.com Top 20 Poll
- 2018–19 Big Ten Hockey Standings
  	Conference record								Overall record					
  	GP	W	L	T	3/SW	PTS	GF	GA	GP	W	L	T	GF	GA
  #12 Ohio State †	24	13	7	4	3	46	79	52	36	20	11	5	108	83
  #10 Notre Dame *	24	11	11	2	2	37	63	65	40	23	14	3	112	91
  #20 Minnesota	24	11	10	3	0	36	76	75	38	18	16	4	117	108
  #17 Penn State	24	11	12	1	1	35	101	96	39	22	15	2	177	139
  Wisconsin	24	9	10	5	2	34	69	81	37	14	18	5	113	130
  Michigan	24	9	10	5	2	34	76	75	36	13	16	7	110	114
  Michigan State	24	8	12	4	2	30	68	88	36	12	19	5	99	122
  Championship: March 23, 2019 † indicates conference regular season champion * indicates conference tournament champion Rankings: USCHO.com Top 20 Poll
- 2018–19 NCAA Division I Independent ice hockey standings
  	Overall record					
  	GP	W	L	T	GF	GA
  #15 Arizona State	35	21	13	1	109	86
  Rankings: USCHO.com Top 20 Poll; Standing
- 2018–19 ECAC Hockey Standings
  	Conference record							Overall record					
  	GP	W	L	T	PTS	GF	GA	GP	W	L	T	GF	GA
  #7 Quinnipiac†	22	14	6	2	30	77	47	38	26	10	2	133	73
  #8 Cornell†	22	13	5	4	30	64	41	36	21	11	4	108	73
  #11 Clarkson*	22	13	7	2	28	65	42	39	26	11	2	122	78
  #14 Harvard	22	13	7	2	28	77	58	33	19	11	3	106	83
  Dartmouth	22	10	9	3	23	53	55	34	13	17	4	87	93
  Yale	22	11	10	1	23	53	57	33	15	15	3	85	88
  Union	22	10	10	2	22	60	64	39	20	13	6	112	102
  Brown	22	8	9	5	21	52	59	34	15	14	5	89	97
  Princeton	22	8	12	2	18	60	66	31	10	18	3	83	96
  Colgate	22	7	12	3	17	43	64	36	10	23	3	55	111
  Rensselaer	22	7	13	2	16	49	67	36	10	23	3	69	117
  St. Lawrence	22	3	17	2	8	51	84	37	6	29	2	75	149
  Championship: March 23, 2019 † indicates conference regular season champion (Cleary Cup) * indicates conference tournament champion (Whitelaw Cup); Rankings: USCHO.com Top 20 Poll
- 2018–19 Hockey East Standings
  	Conference record							Overall record					
  	GP	W	L	T	PTS	GF	GA	GP	W	L	T	GF	GA
  #2 Massachusetts †	24	18	6	0	36	92	51	41	31	10	0	151	83
  #4 Providence	24	14	7	3	31	76	44	42	24	12	6	133	84
  #9 Northeastern*	24	15	8	1	31	76	52	39	27	11	1	118	81
  #19 Massachusetts–Lowell	24	12	7	5	29	65	55	37	19	13	5	100	85
  Boston University	24	12	9	3	27	64	65	38	16	18	4	99	104
  Maine	24	11	9	4	26	64	60	36	15	17	4	90	99
  Boston College	24	10	11	3	23	62	60	39	14	22	3	90	110
  New Hampshire	24	8	10	6	22	55	67	36	12	15	9	90	103
  Connecticut	24	7	15	2	16	52	77	34	12	20	2	81	107
  Vermont	24	5	16	3	13	41	59	34	12	19	3	72	82
  Merrimack	24	4	18	2	10	48	105	34	7	24	3	67	134
  Championship: March 23, 2019 † indicates conference regular season champion * indicates conference tournament champion (Lamoriello Trophy); Rankings: USCHO.com Top 20 Poll
- 2018–19 National Collegiate Hockey Conference Standings
  	Conference record								Overall record					
  	GP	W	L	T	3/SW	PTS	GF	GA	GP	W	L	T	GF	GA
  #5 St. Cloud State †	24	19	2	3	2	62	94	52	39	30	6	3	156	85
  #1 Minnesota Duluth *	24	14	9	1	0	43	75	48	42	29	11	2	133	79
  #18 Western Michigan	24	13	10	1	1	41	79	78	37	21	15	1	129	115
  #3 Denver	24	11	10	3	3	39	55	56	41	24	12	5	116	83
  #20 North Dakota	24	12	11	1	0	37	56	55	37	18	17	2	93	90
  Colorado College	24	9	12	3	0	30	66	66	41	17	20	4	117	114
  Omaha	24	5	17	2	1	18	53	86	36	9	24	3	90	132
  Miami	24	5	17	2	1	18	49	86	38	11	23	4	87	122
  Championship: March 23, 2019 † indicates conference regular season champion (Penrose Cup) * indicates conference tournament champion Rankings: USCHO.com Top 20 Poll
- 2018–19 Western Collegiate Hockey Association Standings
  	Conference record								Overall record					
  	GP	W	L	T	3/SW	PTS	GF	GA	GP	W	L	T	GF	GA
  #6 Minnesota State †*	28	22	5	1	1	68	99	43	42	32	8	2	147	76
  Northern Michigan	28	18	8	2	0	56	82	57	39	21	16	2	104	96
  #13 Bowling Green	28	16	8	4	3	55	77	52	41	25	11	5	133	75
  Lake Superior State	28	16	10	2	0	50	91	69	38	23	13	2	123	93
  Bemidji State	28	13	11	4	2	45	71	63	38	15	17	6	95	94
  Michigan Tech	28	13	12	3	1	43	68	63	38	14	20	4	90	101
  Alaska	28	12	14	2	2	40	57	81	36	12	21	3	72	114
  Alabama–Huntsville	28	8	18	2	2	28	61	93	38	8	28	2	67	129
  Ferris State	28	7	18	3	0	24	68	96	36	10	23	3	90	123
  Alaska Anchorage	28	2	23	3	2	11	29	86	34	3	28	3	40	115
  Championship: March 23, 2019 † indicates conference regular season champion (MacNaughton Cup) * indicates conference tournament champion (Broadmoor Trophy); Rankings: USCHO.com Top 20 Poll

== PairWise Rankings ==
The PairWise Rankings (PWR) are a statistical tool designed to approximate the process by which the NCAA selection committee decides which teams get at-large bids to the 16-team NCAA tournament. Although the NCAA selection committee does not use the PWR as presented by USCHO, the PWR has been accurate in predicting which teams will make the tournament field.

For Division I men, all teams are included in comparisons starting in the 2013–14 season (formerly, only teams with a Ratings Percentage Index of .500 or above, or teams under consideration, were included). The PWR method compares each team with every other such team, with the winner of each “comparison” earning one PWR point. After all comparisons are made, the points are totaled up and rankings listed accordingly.

With 60 Division I men's teams, the greatest number of PWR points any team could earn is 59, winning the comparison with every other team. Meanwhile, a team that lost all of its comparisons would have no PWR points.

Teams are then ranked by PWR point total, with ties broken by the teams’ RPI ratings, which starting in 2013–14 is weighted for home and road games and includes a quality wins bonus (QWB) for beating teams in the top 20 of the RPI (it also is weighted for home and road).

When it comes to comparing teams, the PWR uses three criteria which are combined to make a comparison: RPI, record against common opponents and head-to-head competition. Starting in 2013–14, the comparison of record against teams under consideration was dropped because all teams are now under comparison.

NCAA Division I Men's Hockey Final PairWise Rankings
Rank	Team	PWR	RPI	Conference
1	St. Cloud State	58	.6117*	NCHC
1	Minnesota–Duluth	58	.5833	NCHC
3	Minnesota State	57	.5796*	WCHA
4	Massachusetts	56	.5763	Hockey East
5	Clarkson	55	.5609*	ECAC Hockey
6	Northeastern	54	.5593	Hockey East
7	Quinnipiac	53	.5588*	ECAC Hockey
8	Denver	52	.5579	NCHC
9	Ohio State	51	.5550	Big Ten
10	Arizona State	50	.5508	Independent
11	Cornell	49	.5457	ECAC Hockey
12	Notre Dame	47	.5433	Big Ten
12	Harvard	47	.5425	ECAC Hockey
14	Providence	46	.5423	Hockey East
15	Bowling Green	45	.5408*	WCHA
16	Penn State	44	.5374	Big Ten
17	Western Michigan	43	.5339	NCHC
17	Union	43	.5338	ECAC Hockey
19	Minnesota	41	.5260	Big Ten
20	North Dakota	40	.5281*	NCHC
21	UMass Lowell	39	.5246	Hockey East
22	Lake Superior State	38	.5215*	WCHA
23	Colorado College	37	.5131*	NCHC
24	Northern Michigan	36	.5120	WCHA
25	Boston University	34	.5101	Hockey East
26	Brown	33	.5115	ECAC Hockey
26	Wisconsin	33	.5083	Big Ten
28	Michigan	31	.5052	Big Ten
28	Maine	31	.5032	Hockey East
30	Yale	30	.5036	ECAC Hockey
31	American International	28	.5012	Atlantic Hockey
31	Michigan State	28	.5003	Big Ten
33	New Hampshire	27	.4936	Hockey East
34	Boston College	26	.4958	Hockey East
35	Bemidji State	25	.4864	WCHA
35	RIT	25	.4849	Atlantic Hockey
37	Dartmouth	22	.4800	ECAC Hockey
37	Miami	22	.4790	NCHC
37	Vermont	22	.4776	Hockey East
40	Bentley	21	.4781	Atlantic Hockey
41	Sacred Heart	20	.4780	Atlantic Hockey
42	Michigan Tech	18	.4748	WCHA
43	Air Force	17	.4745	Atlantic Hockey
44	Princeton	16	.4740	ECAC Hockey
45	Niagara	15	.4738	Atlantic Hockey
45	Connecticut	15	.4713	Hockey East
47	Omaha	13	.4684	NCHC
48	Alaska	12	.4666	WCHA
49	Robert Morris	11	.4625	Atlantic Hockey
50	Colgate	10	.4619	ECAC Hockey
51	Rensselaer	9	.4615	ECAC Hockey
52	Army	8	.4541	Atlantic Hockey
53	Mercyhurst	7	.4515	Atlantic Hockey
53	Canisius	7	.4510	Atlantic Hockey
55	Merrimack	5	.4447	Hockey East
56	Holy Cross	4	.4435	Atlantic Hockey
57	Ferris State	3	.4420	WCHA
58	Alabama–Huntsville	2	.4299	WCHA
59	St. Lawrence	1	.4186	ECAC Hockey
60	Alaska Anchorage	0	.3935	WCHA
*A team's RPI has been adjusted to remove negative effect from defeating a weak opponent Note: A team's record is based only on games against other Division I hockey schools which are eligible for the NCAA tournament; PairWise Rankings were last updated March 25, 2019, 12:22pm ET

== 2019 NCAA tournament ==
Regional semifinals March 29–30
1	St. Cloud State (1)	1
4	American International	2
West – Fargo – Fri/Sat
2	Denver	2
3	Ohio State	0
1	Massachusetts (4)	4
4	Harvard	0
Northeast – Manchester – Fri/Sat
2	Clarkson	2
3	Notre Dame	3*
1	Minnesota–Duluth (2)	2*
4	Bowling Green	1
Midwest – Allentown – Sat/Sun
2	Quinnipiac	2
3	Arizona State	1
1	Minnesota State (3)	3
4	Providence	6
East – Providence – Sat/Sun
2	Northeastern	1
3	Cornell	5

Regional Finals; March 30–31
4	American International	0
2	Denver	3
1	Massachusetts (4)	4
3	Notre Dame	0
1	Minnesota–Duluth (2)	3
2	Quinnipiac	1
4	Providence	4
3	Cornell	0

Semifinals; April 11
W2	Denver	3
NE1	Massachusetts (4)	4*
MW1	Minnesota–Duluth (2)	4
E4	Providence	1

Championship; April 13
NE1	Massachusetts (4)	0
MW1	Minnesota–Duluth (2)	3

Note: * denotes overtime period

== Player stats ==
=== Scoring leaders ===
GP = Games played; G = Goals; A = Assists; Pts = Points; PIM = Penalty minutes

Player	Class	Team	GP	G	A	Pts	PIM
Alex Limoges	Sophomore	Penn State	39	23	27	50	10
Taro Hirose	Junior	Michigan State	36	15	35	50	14
Cale Makar	Sophomore	Massachusetts	41	16	33	49	31
Patrick Newell	Senior	St. Cloud State	39	21	26	47	8
Joseph Duszak	Junior	Mercyhurst	37	16	31	47	42
Blake Christensen	Junior	American International	41	16	31	47	22
Jacob Pritchard	Senior	Massachusetts	41	16	31	47	8
Josh Wilkins	Junior	Providence	40	20	26	46	10
Rem Pitlick	Junior	Minnesota	38	21	24	45	30
Nico Sturm	Junior	Clarkson	39	14	31	45	33
Adam Fox	Junior	Harvard	32	9	36	45	14

=== Leading goaltenders ===
The following goaltenders lead the NCAA in goals against average.
GP = Games played; Min = Minutes played; W = Wins; L = Losses; T = Ties; GA = Goals against; SO = Shutouts; SV% = Save percentage; GAA = Goals against average

Player	Class	Team	GP	Min	W	L	T	GA	SO	SV%	GAA
Andrew Shortridge	Junior	Quinnipiac	27	1544:39	18	7	2	39	4	.940	1.51
Filip Lindberg	Freshman	Massachusetts	17	939:31	11	4	0	25	4	.934	1.60
Dryden McKay	Freshman	Minnesota State	34	2011:26	24	7	2	59	4	.927	1.76
Hunter Shepard	Junior	Minnesota–Duluth	42	2556:19	29	11	2	75	7	.923	1.76
Ryan Bednard	Junior	Bowling Green	32	1961:52	20	8	4	58	3	.927	1.77
Matthew Galajda	Sophomore	Cornell	27	1591:50	16	7	3	48	5	.923	1.81
Devin Cooley	Sophomore	Denver	20	1169:27	11	6	2	36	4	.934	1.85
Tommy Nappier	Sophomore	Ohio State	20	1160:38	12	4	3	36	4	.934	1.86
Hayden Hawkey	Senior	Providence	41	2463:31	24	12	5	75	8	.921	1.88
Jake Kielly	Junior	Clarkson	39	2325:53	26	11	2	74	5	.929	1.91

== Awards ==
=== NCAA ===
Award		Recipient
Hobey Baker Award		Cale Makar, Massachusetts
Spencer Penrose Award		Greg Carvel, Massachusetts
Tim Taylor Award		Joel Farabee, Boston University
Mike Richter Award		Cayden Primeau, Northeastern
Derek Hines Unsung Hero Award		Brendon Kearney, Ohio State
Lowe's Senior CLASS Award		Kyle Haak, Air Force
Tournament Most Outstanding Player		Parker Mackay, Minnesota-Duluth
AHCA All-American Teams
East First Team	Position	West First Team
Cayden Primeau, Northeastern	G	Hunter Shepard, Minnesota–Duluth
Cale Makar, Massachusetts	D	Jimmy Schuldt, St. Cloud State
Adam Fox, Harvard	D	Quinn Hughes, Michigan
Nico Sturm, Clarkson	F	Rem Pitlick, Minnesota
Ryan Kuffner, Princeton	F	Patrick Newell, St. Cloud State
Mitchell Chaffee, Massachusetts	F	Taro Hirose, Michigan State
East Second Team	Position	West Second Team
Andrew Shortridge, Quinnipiac	G	Joey Daccord, Arizona State
Joseph Duszak, Mercyhurst	D	Scott Perunovich, Minnesota–Duluth
Jérémy Davies, Northeastern	D	Bobby Nardella, Notre Dame
	D	Jack Ahcan, St. Cloud State
Josh Wilkins, Providence	F	Troy Loggins, Northern Michigan
David Cotton, Boston College	F	Blake Lizotte, St. Cloud State
Blake Christensen, American International	F	Mason Jobst, Ohio State

=== Atlantic Hockey ===
Award		Recipient
Player of the Year		Joseph Duszak, Mercyhurst
Rookie of the Year		Ludwig Stenlund, Niagara
Best Defensive Forward		Joshua Lammon, Mercyhurst
Best Defenseman		Joseph Duszak, Mercyhurst
Individual Sportsmanship Award		Dylan McLaughlin, Canisius
Regular Season Scoring Trophy		Blake Christensen, American International
Regular Season Goaltending Award		Billy Christopoulos, Air Force
Coach of the Year		Eric Lang, American International
Tournament MVP		Zackarias Skog, American International
All-Atlantic Hockey Teams
First Team	Position	Second Team
Billy Christopoulos, Air Force	G	Aidan Pelino, Bentley
Joseph Duszak, Mercyhurst	D	Tanner Jago, Bentley
Brennan Kapcheck, American International	D	Dalton MacAfee, Army
Derek Barach, Mercyhurst	F	Abbott Girduckis, RIT
Blake Christensen, American International	F	Luke Santerno, Bentley
Dylan McLaughlin, Cansius	F	Alex Tonge, Robert Morris
Third Team	Position	Rookie Team
Frank Marotte, Robert Morris	G	Josh Benson, Sacred Heart
Adam Brubacher, RIT	D	Josh McDougall, Mercyhurst
Noah Delmas, Niagara	D	Matt Slick, Holy Cross
Erik Brown, RIT	F	Austin Magera, Sacred Heart
Jonathan Desbiens, Bentley	F	Ludwig Stenlund, Niagara
Austin Magera, Sacred Heart	F	Anthony Vincent, Holy Cross
Ludwig Stenlund, Niagara	F	–

=== Big Ten ===
Award		Recipient
Player of the Year		Taro Hirose, Michigan State
Defensive Player of the Year		Sasha Larocque, Ohio State
Goaltender of the Year		Tommy Nappier, Ohio State
Freshman of the Year		Sammy Walker, Minnesota
Scoring Champion		Taro Hirose, Michigan State
Coach of the Year		Steve Rohlik, Ohio State
Tournament Most Outstanding Player		Cale Morris, Notre Dame
All-Big Ten Teams
First Team	Position	Second Team
Tommy Nappier, Ohio State	G	Cale Morris, Notre Dame
Quinn Hughes, Michigan	D	Sasha Larocque, Ohio State
Bobby Nardella, Notre Dame	D	Wyatt Kalynuk, Wisconsin
Taro Hirose, Michigan State	F	Patrick Khodorenko, Michigan State
Rem Pitlick, Minnesota	F	Tyler Sheehy, Minnesota
Nick Schilkey, Ohio State	F	–
Honorable Mention	Position	Freshman Team
Mat Robson, Minnesota	G	Drew DeRidder, Michigan State
Cole Hults, Penn State	D	Dennis Cesana, Michigan State
K'Andre Miller, Wisconsin	D	K'Andre Miller, Wisconsin
Zach Osburn, Michigan State	D	–
Brandon Biro, Penn State	F	Michael Graham, Notre Dame
Tanner Laczynski, Ohio State	F	Sammy Walker, Minnesota
Mitchell Lewandowski, Michigan State	F	Gustaf Westlund, Ohio State
Will Lockwood, Michigan	F	–
Dylan Malmquist, Notre Dame	F	–

=== ECAC ===
Award		Recipient
Player of the Year		Adam Fox, Harvard
Best Defensive Forward		Nico Sturm, Clarkson
Best Defensive Defenseman		Matt Nuttle, Cornell
Rookie of the Year		Casey Dornbach, Harvard
Ken Dryden Award		Andrew Shortridge, Quinnipiac
Student-Athlete of the Year		Devin Brosseau, Clarkson
Tim Taylor Award		Casey Jones, Clarkson
Most Outstanding Player in Tournament		Devin Brosseau, Clarkson
All-ECAC Hockey Teams
First Team	Position	Second Team
Andrew Shortridge, Quinnipiac	G	Jake Kielly, Clarkson
Adam Fox, Harvard	D	Yanni Kaldis, Cornell
Chase Priskie, Quinnipiac	D	Aaron Thow, Clarkson
Morgan Barron, Cornell	F	Haralds Egle, Clarkson
Ryan Kuffner, Princeton	F	Odeen Tufto, Quinnipiac
Joe Snively, Yale	F	Max Véronneau, Princeton
Third Team	Position	Rookie Team
Matthew Galajda, Cornell	G	Owen Savory, RPI
Josh Teves, Princeton	D	Peter DiLiberatore, Quinnipiac
Reilly Walsh, Harvard	D	Jack Rathbone, Harvard
Cam Donaldson, Cornell	F	Wyatt Bongiovanni, Quinnipiac
Cole Maier, Union	F	Casey Dornbach, Harvard
Bobby McMann, Colgate	F	Jack Drury, Harvard

=== Hockey East ===
Award		Recipient
Player of the Year		Cale Makar, Massachusetts
Best Defensive Forward		Chase Pearson, Maine
Best Defensive Defenseman		Vincent Desharnais, Providence
Rookie of the Year		Joel Farabee, Boston University
Goaltending Champions		Cayden Primeau, Northeastern
Len Ceglarski Sportmanship Award		Jacob Bryson, Providence
Three Stars Award		Cayden Primeau, Northeastern
Scoring Champion		Mitchell Chaffee, Massachusetts
Charlie Holt Team Sportsmanship Award		UMass Lowell
Bob Kullen Award (Coach of the Year)		Greg Carvel, Massachusetts
William Flynn Tournament Most Valuable Player		Cayden Primeau, Northeastern
Hockey East All-Star Teams
First Team	Position	Second Team
Cayden Primeau, Northeastern	G	Stefanos Lekkas, Vermont
Jérémy Davies, Northeastern	D	Jacob Bryson, Providence
Cale Makar, Massachusetts	D	Dante Fabbro, Boston University
Mitchell Chaffee, Massachusetts	F	John Leonard, Massachusetts
David Cotton, Boston College	F	Chase Pearson, Maine
Josh Wilkins, Providence	F	Jacob Pritchard, Massachusetts
Third Team	Position	Rookie Team
Jeremy Swayman, Maine	G	Tomáš Vomáčka, Connecticut
Marc Del Gaizo, Massachusetts	D	Marc Del Gaizo, Massachusetts
Mario Ferraro, Massachusetts	D	–
Brady Keeper, Maine	D	–
Brandon Duhaime, Providence	F	Jack Dugan, Providence
Karl El-Mir, Connecticut	F	Joel Farabee, Boston University
Mitchell Fossier, Maine	F	Chase Gresock, Merrimack
–	F	Tyler Madden, Northeastern
Honorable Mention	Position	
Hayden Hawkey, Providence	G	–
Casey Fitzgerald, Boston College	D	–
Tyler Madden, Northeastern	F	–

=== NCHC ===
Award		Recipient
Player of the Year		Jimmy Schuldt, St. Cloud State
Rookie of the Year		Taylor Ward, Omaha
Goaltender of the Year		Hunter Shepard, Minnesota–Duluth
Forward of the Year		Patrick Newell, St. Cloud State
Defensive Defenseman of the Year		Jimmy Schuldt, St. Cloud State
Offensive Defenseman of the Year		Scott Perunovich, Minnesota–Duluth
Defensive Forward of the Year		Justin Richards, Minnesota–Duluth
Scholar-Athlete of the Year		Mason Bergh, Colorado College
Three Stars Award		Hunter Shepard, Minnesota–Duluth
Sportsmanship Award		Patrick Newell, St. Cloud State
Herb Brooks Coach of the Year		Brett Larson, St. Cloud State
Frozen Faceoff MVP		Hunter Shepard, Minnesota–Duluth
All-NCHC Teams
First Team	Position	Second Team
Hunter Shepard, Minnesota–Duluth	G	Dávid Hrenák, St. Cloud State
Jimmy Schuldt, St. Cloud State	D	Ian Mitchell, Denver
Scott Perunovich, Minnesota–Duluth	D	Jack Ahcan, St. Cloud State
Patrick Newell, St. Cloud State	F	Hugh McGing, Western Michigan
Ryan Poehling, St. Cloud State	F	Justin Richards, Minnesota–Duluth
Blake Lizotte, St. Cloud State	F	Mason Morelli, Omaha
Honorable Mention	Position	Rookie Team
Alex Leclerc, Colorado College	G	Adam Scheel, North Dakota
Filip Larsson, Denver	G	Filip Larsson, Denver
Colton Poolman, North Dakota	D	Bryan Yoon, Colorado College
Mikey Anderson, Minnesota–Duluth	D	Nick Perbix, St. Cloud State
Trey Bradley, Colorado College	F	Noah Cates, Minnesota–Duluth
Nick Swaney, Minnesota–Duluth	F	Taylor Ward, Omaha
–	F	Nolan Walker, St. Cloud State

=== WCHA ===
Award		Recipient
Player of the Year		Troy Loggins, Northern Michigan
Outstanding Student-Athlete of the Year		Max Coatta, Minnesota State
Defensive Player of the Year		Philip Beaulieu, Northern Michigan
Rookie of the Year		Cooper Zech, Ferris State
Scoring Champion		Troy Loggins, Northern Michigan
Goaltender of the Year		Atte Tolvanen, Northern Michigan
Coach of the Year		Mike Hastings, Minnesota State
Most Valuable Player in Tournament		
All-WCHA Hockey Teams
First Team	Position	Second Team
Atte Tolvanen, Northern Michigan	G	Dryden McKay, Minnesota State
Philip Beaulieu, Northern Michigan	D	Justin Baudry, Bemidji State
Cooper Zech, Ferris State	D	Alec Rauhauser, Bowling Green
Diego Cuglietta, Lake Superior State	F	Brandon Kruse, Bowling Green
Troy Loggins, Northern Michigan	F	Adam Rockwood, Northern Michigan
Marc Michaelis, Minnesota State	F	Parker Tuomie, Minnesota State
Third Team	Position	Rookie Team
Ryan Bednard, Bowling Green	G	Dryden McKay, Minnesota State
Connor Mackey, Minnesota State	D	Chris Jandric, Alaska
Ian Scheid, Minnesota State	D	Cooper Zech, Ferris State
Max Humitz, Lake Superior State	F	Ashton Calder, Minnesota State
Steven Jandric, Alaska	F	Brian Halonen, Michigan Tech
Anthony Nellis, Lake Superior State	F	Julian Napravnik, Minnesota State
–	F	Owen Sillinger, Bemidji State

== Coaching changes ==
This table lists programs that changed head coaches at any point from the first day of the 2018–19 season until the day before the first day of the 2019–2020 season.

Team	Former coach	Interim coach	New coach	Reason
Bowling Green	Chris Bergeron		Ty Eigner	On April 5, 2019, Chris Bergeron accepted the head coaching position at Miami, leaving Bowling Green after nine seasons. On April 20, 2019, Ty Eigner was named the new head coach for the 2019–20 season.
Miami	Enrico Blasi	Peter Mannino	Chris Bergeron	On March 19, 2019, Miami announced that it was parting ways with head coach Enrico Blasi. Peter Mannino was elevated to interim head coach. On April 5, 2019, Chris Bergeron was named the new head coach for the 2019–20 season.
St. Lawrence	Mark Morris		Brent Brekke	On March 29, 2019, St. Lawrence announced that it was parting ways with head coach Mark Morris. On May 25, 2019, Brent Brekke was named the new head coach for the 2019–20 season.

== 2019 NHL entry draft ==
Round	Pick	Player	College	Conference	NHL team
1	5	Alex Turcotte ^{†}	Wisconsin	Big Ten	Los Angeles Kings
1	9	Trevor Zegras ^{†}	Boston University	Hockey East	Anaheim Ducks
1	12	Matthew Boldy ^{†}	Boston College	Hockey East	Minnesota Wild
1	13	Spencer Knight ^{†}	Boston College	Hockey East	Florida Panthers
1	14	Cameron York ^{†}	Michigan	Big Ten	Philadelphia Flyers
1	15	Cole Caufield ^{†}	Wisconsin	Big Ten	Montreal Canadiens
1	16	Alex Newhook ^{†}	Boston College	Hockey East	Colorado Avalanche
1	30	John Beecher ^{†}	Michigan	Big Ten	Boston Bruins
1	31	Ryan Johnson ^{†}	Minnesota	Big Ten	Buffalo Sabres
2	32	Shane Pinto ^{†}	North Dakota	NCHC	Ottawa Senators
2	34	Bobby Brink ^{†}	Denver	NCHC	Philadelphia Flyers
2	35	Antti Tuomisto ^{†}	Denver	NCHC	Detroit Red Wings
2	39	Jackson LaCombe ^{†}	Minnesota	Big Ten	Anaheim Ducks
2	42	Vladislav Firstov ^{†}	Connecticut	Hockey East	Minnesota Wild
2	43	Alex Vlasic ^{†}	Boston University	Hockey East	Chicago Blackhawks
2	46	Jayden Struble ^{†}	Northeastern	Hockey East	Montreal Canadiens
2	47	Drew Helleson ^{†}	Boston College	Hockey East	Colorado Avalanche
2	54	Robert Mastrosimone ^{†}	Boston University	Hockey East	Detroit Red Wings
3	63	Matt Stienburg ^{†}	Cornell	ECAC Hockey	Colorado Avalanche
3	65	Alexander Campbell ^{†}	Clarkson	ECAC Hockey	Nashville Predators
3	67	Erik Portillo ^{†}	Michigan	Big Ten	Buffalo Sabres
3	68	Zac Jones ^{†}	Massachusetts	Hockey East	New York Rangers
3	72	Ronnie Attard ^{†}	Western Michigan	NCHC	Philadelphia Flyers
3	76	John Farinacci ^{†}	Harvard	ECAC Hockey	Arizona Coyotes
3	86	Layton Ahac ^{†}	Ohio State	Big Ten	Vegas Golden Knights
3	90	Domenick Fensore ^{†}	Boston University	Hockey East	Carolina Hurricanes
3	92	Quinn Olson ^{†}	Minnesota–Duluth	NCHC	Boston Bruins
4	96	Tyce Thompson	Providence	Hockey East	New Jersey Devils
4	97	Ethan Phillips ^{†}	Boston University	Hockey East	Detroit Red Wings
4	99	Cade Webber ^{†}	Boston University	Hockey East	Carolina Hurricanes
4	101	Henry Thrun ^{†}	Harvard	ECAC Hockey	Anaheim Ducks
4	102	Aaron Huglen ^{†}	Minnesota	Big Ten	Buffalo Sabres
4	106	Carter Berger ^{†}	Connecticut	Hockey East	Florida Panthers
4	109	Marc Del Gaizo	Massachusetts	Hockey East	Nashville Predators
4	110	Ryder Donovan ^{†}	Wisconsin	Big Ten	Vegas Golden Knights
4	112	Hunter Skinner ^{†}	Western Michigan	NCHC	New York Rangers
4	118	Case McCarthy ^{†}	Boston University	Hockey East	New Jersey Devils
4	120	Max Crozier ^{†}	Providence	Hockey East	Tampa Bay Lightning
4	124	Nick Abruzzese ^{†}	Harvard	ECAC Hockey	Toronto Maple Leafs
5	127	Cole Brady ^{†}	Arizona State	Independent	New Jersey Devils
5	128	Cooper Moore ^{†}	North Dakota	NCHC	Detroit Red Wings
5	131	Rhett Pitlick ^{†}	Minnesota	Big Ten	Montreal Canadiens
5	132	Trevor Janicke ^{†}	Notre Dame	Big Ten	Anaheim Ducks
5	134	Harrison Blaisdell ^{†}	North Dakota	NCHC	Winnipeg Jets
5	135	Isaiah Saville ^{†}	Omaha	NCHC	Vegas Golden Knights
5	137	Owen Lindmark ^{†}	Wisconsin	Big Ten	Florida Panthers
5	144	Logan Neaton ^{†}	Massachusetts–Lowell	Hockey East	Winnipeg Jets
5	145	Judd Caulfield ^{†}	North Dakota	NCHC	Pittsburgh Penguins
5	146	Michael Koster ^{†}	Minnesota	Big Ten	Toronto Maple Leafs
5	148	Ethan Haider ^{†}	Clarkson	ECAC Hockey	Nashville Predators
5	150	Josh Nodler ^{†}	Michigan State	Big Ten	Calgary Flames
6	157	Braden Doyle ^{†}	Boston University	Hockey East	Los Angeles Kings
6	158	Patrick Moynihan ^{†}	Providence	Hockey East	New Jersey Devils
6	162	Tomas Mazura ^{†}	Providence	Hockey East	Edmonton Oilers
6	163	Will Francis ^{†}	Minnesota–Duluth	NCHC	Anaheim Ducks
6	166	Marshall Warren ^{†}	Boston College	Hockey East	Minnesota Wild
6	167	Dominic Basse ^{†}	Colorado College	NCHC	Chicago Blackhawks
6	172	Nikita Nesterenko ^{†}	Boston College	Hockey East	Minnesota Wild
6	173	Ben Brinkman	Minnesota	Big Ten	Dallas Stars
6	176	Anthony Romano ^{†}	Clarkson	ECAC Hockey	Arizona Coyotes
6	180	Jack Malone ^{†}	Cornell	ECAC Hockey	Vancouver Canucks
6	181	Kevin Wall ^{†}	Penn State	Big Ten	Carolina Hurricanes
7	188	Andre Lee ^{†}	Massachusetts–Lowell	Hockey East	Los Angeles Kings
7	191	Carter Gylander ^{†}	Colgate	ECAC Hockey	Detroit Red Wings
7	192	Jake Schmaltz ^{†}	North Dakota	NCHC	Boston Bruins
7	195	Aidan McDonough ^{†}	Northeastern	Hockey East	Vancouver Canucks
7	196	Bryce Brodzinski ^{†}	Minnesota	Big Ten	Philadelphia Flyers
7	197	Filip Lindberg	Massachusetts	Hockey East	Minnesota Wild
7	205	Eric Ciccolini ^{†}	Michigan	Big Ten	New York Rangers
7	213	McKade Webster ^{†}	Denver	NCHC	Tampa Bay Lightning
7	216	Massimo Rizzo ^{†}	Denver	NCHC	Carolina Hurricanes

† incoming freshman

== See also ==
- 2018–19 NCAA Division II men's ice hockey season
- 2018–19 NCAA Division III men's ice hockey season
