= 2018–19 NCAA Division I men's ice hockey rankings =

- NCAA tournament: 2019
- NCAA champion: Minnesota–Duluth
- Preseason No. 1 (USA Today): Minnesota–Duluth
- Preseason No. 1 (USCHO): Minnesota–Duluth
- NCAA Division I men's ice hockey rankings

Two human polls made up the 2018–19 NCAA Division I men's ice hockey rankings, the USCHO.com/CBS College Sports poll and the USA Today/USA Hockey Magazine poll. As the 2018–19 season progressed, rankings were updated weekly.

== Legend ==
	Increase in ranking
	Decrease in ranking
	Not ranked previous week
Italics	Number of first place votes
(#-#)	Win–loss–tie record
т	Tied with team above or below also with this symbol

== USCHO ==
	Preseason Sep 24	Week 1 Oct 8	Week 2 Oct 15	Week 3 Oct 22	Week 4 Oct 29	Week 5 Nov 5	Week 6 Nov 12	Week 7 Nov 19	Week 8 Nov 26	Week 9 Dec 3	Week 10 Dec 10	Week 13 Jan 7	Week 14 Jan 14	Week 15 Jan 21	Week 16 Jan 28	Week 17 Feb 4	Week 18 Feb 11	Week 19 Feb 18	Week 20 Feb 25	Week 21 Mar 4	Week 22 Mar 11	Week 23 Mar 18	Week 24 Mar 25	Final April 15	
1.	Minnesota–Duluth (44)	Ohio State (0–0–0) (18)	Ohio State (2–0–0) (38)	Notre Dame (3–0–1) (28)	Minnesota–Duluth (6–1–1) (47)	Minnesota–Duluth (6–1–1) (44)	Minnesota–Duluth (8–1–1) (41)	St. Cloud State (11–1–0) (38)	St. Cloud State (11–1–0) (45)	Massachusetts (12–1–0) (26)	St. Cloud State (13–1–2) (40)	St. Cloud State (14–2–2) (25)	Massachusetts (17–3–0) (35)	St. Cloud State (17–3–2) (46)	St. Cloud State (18–4–2) (33)	St. Cloud State (20–4–2) (46)	St. Cloud State (21–4–3) (42)	St. Cloud State (21–4–3) (45)	St. Cloud State (23–4–3) (49)	St. Cloud State (25–4–3) (49)	St. Cloud State (27–4–3) (49)	St. Cloud State (29–4–3) (49)	St. Cloud State (30–5–3) (43)	Minnesota-Duluth (29–11–2) (50)	1.
2.	Notre Dame (2)	Notre Dame (0–0–0) (12)	Notre Dame (1–0–1) (4)	St. Cloud State (4–0–0) (14)	St. Cloud State (4–0–0) (2)	St. Cloud State (7–1–0) (4)	St. Cloud State (9–1–0) (7)	Minnesota–Duluth (9–2–1) (7)	Minnesota–Duluth (9–2–1) (3)	St. Cloud State (11–1–2) (22)	Massachusetts (13–2–0) (9)	Massachusetts (15–3–0) (22)	St. Cloud State (15–3–2) (12)	Massachusetts (18–4–0) (4)	Massachusetts (19–5–0) (3)	Massachusetts (20–5–0) (2)	Ohio State (19–5–4) (6)	Massachusetts (23–6–0) (4)	Massachusetts (24–7–0) (1)	Massachusetts (26–7–0) (1)	Minnesota State (29–7–2)	Minnesota State (31–7–2)	Minnesota-Duluth (25–11–2) (3)	Massachusetts (31–10–0)	2.
3.	Ohio State (2)	Minnesota–Duluth (0–1–1) (8)	Minnesota–Duluth (2–1–1)	Minnesota–Duluth (4–1–1) (5)	Providence (4–1–1)	Minnesota State (7–1–0) (2)	Minnesota State (7–1–0) (2)	Minnesota State (9–1–0) (3)	Massachusetts (11–1–0) (2)	Minnesota State (12–2–0) (1)	Minnesota State (14–2–0) (1)	Denver (12–4–2) (3)	Denver (14–4–2) (3)	Ohio State (15–5–4)	Minnesota–Duluth (16–6–2) (7)	Ohio State (17–5–4) (1)	Massachusetts (21–6–0) (1)	Minnesota–Duluth (18–8–2)	Minnesota–Duluth (19–9–2)	Minnesota–Duluth (21–9–2)	Massachusetts (26–8–0) (1)	Massachusetts (28–8–0) (1)	Minnesota State (32–7–2) (3)	Denver (24–12–5)	3.
4.	Michigan (2)	Providence (1–0–0) (3)	St. Cloud State (2–0–0) (6)	Ohio State (3–1–0) (1)	Minnesota State (5–1–0)	Providence (5–1–1)	Massachusetts (8–1–0)	Massachusetts (10–1–0) (2)	Minnesota State (10–2–0)	Minnesota–Duluth (10–3–1) (1)	Minnesota–Duluth (10–4–2)	Ohio State (12–4–4)	Ohio State (13–5–4)	Denver (14–4–3)	Ohio State (15–5–4) (6)	Quinnipiac (20–5–1) (1)	Minnesota–Duluth (17–7–2)	Minnesota State (24–6–2) (1)	Minnesota State (25–7–2)	Minnesota State (27–7–2)	Minnesota–Duluth (21–11–2)	Minnesota–Duluth (23–11–2)	Massachusetts (28–9–0) (1)	Providence (24–12–6)	4.
5.	Providence	St. Cloud State (0–0–0) (4)	Providence (2–1–0)	Minnesota (1–0–1) (2)	Notre Dame (3–2–1)	Denver (5–0–1)	Penn State (8–1–0)	Ohio State (8–3–1)	Ohio State (9–4–1)	Notre Dame (10–4–1)	Quinnipiac (14–3–0)	Minnesota–Duluth (11–5–2)	Minnesota–Duluth (12–6–2)	Minnesota–Duluth (14–6–2)	Quinnipiac (18–5–1) (1)	Minnesota–Duluth (17–7–2)	Minnesota State (24–6–2) (1)	Quinnipiac (22–6–2)	Quinnipiac (23–7–2)	Quinnipiac (25–7–2)	Quinnipiac (25–7–2)	Denver (21–10–5)	Northeastern (27–10–1)	St. Cloud State (30–6–3)	5.
6.	St. Cloud State	Minnesota (1–0–1) (3)	Minnesota (1–0–1) (2)	Providence (3–1–1)	Penn State (5–0–0) (1)	Notre Dame (4–3–1)	Ohio State (6–3–1)	Penn State (9–2–0)	Penn State (10–3–0)	Denver (7–3–2)	Notre Dame (11–5–1)	Quinnipiac (15–4–1)	Minnesota State (18–5–1)	Quinnipiac (17–5–1)	Minnesota State (21–6–1)	Minnesota State (23–6–1)	Quinnipiac (21–6–1)	Ohio State (19–7–4)	Denver (17–8–4)	Denver (19–8–5)	Ohio State (20–9–5)	Northeastern (25–10–1)	Denver (22–11–5)	Minnesota State (32–8–2)	6.
7.	Cornell	Cornell (0–0–0)	Minnesota State (2–0–0)	Minnesota State (3–1–0)	Ohio State (3–2–1)	Ohio State (4–3–1)	Denver (5–2–1)	Denver (6–3–1)	Denver (7–3–2)	Ohio State (9–4–3)	Ohio State (9–4–3)	Providence (12–4–4)	Quinnipiac (16–5–1)	Minnesota State (19–6–1)	Denver (14–6–3)	Denver (15–6–4)	Denver (15–6–4)	Denver (16–7–4)	Ohio State (19–8–5)	Ohio State (20–9–5)	Providence (21–9–6)	Quinnipiac (25–9–2)	Clarkson (26–10–2)	Quinnipiac (26–10–2)	7.
8.	Boston University	Boston University (0–0–0)	Cornell (0–0–0)	Cornell (0–0–0)	Denver (3–0–1)	Penn State (6–1–0)	Notre Dame (5–4–1)	Notre Dame (7–4–1)	Notre Dame (7–4–1)	Quinnipiac (13–2–0)	Denver (8–4–2)	Minnesota State (16–5–1)	Northeastern (14–4–1)	Northeastern (15–5–1)	Western Michigan (15–8–1)	Western Michigan (16–9–1)	Cornell (15–6–2)	Western Michigan (17–10–1)	Providence (19–9–5)	Providence (20–9–6)	Denver (19–10–5)	Ohio State (20–10–5)	Quinnipiac (25–9–2)	Cornell (21–11–4)	8.
9.	Denver	Michigan (0–1–0)	Denver (2–0–0)	Denver (3–0–1)	Bowling Green (5–1–1)	Massachusetts (6–1–0)	Providence (5–3–1)	Providence (7–3–1)	Quinnipiac (11–2–0)	Penn State (10–4–1)	Penn State (11–5–1)	Notre Dame (12–6–1)	Bowling Green (15–5–3)	Bowling Green (16–6–3)	Providence (15–7–4)	Clarkson (18–8–0)	Western Michigan (16–9–1)	Cornell (15–7–3)	Northeastern (21–9–1)	Northeastern (22–10–1)	Northeastern (23–10–1)	Clarkson (24–10–2)	Ohio State (20–10–5)	Northeastern (27–11–1)	9.
10.	Minnesota State	Denver (0–0–0)	Penn State (2–0–0)	Penn State (4–0–0)	Minnesota (1–1–1)	Bowling Green (6–2–1)	Bowling Green (7–2–2)	Quinnipiac (9–2–0)	Providence (7–4–2)	Providence (8–4–3)	Providence (8–4–3)	Bowling Green (14–4–3)	Western Michigan (13–6–1)	Clarkson (16–6–0)	Clarkson (17–7–0)	Cornell (13–6–2)	UMass Lowell (17–8–2)	Providence (18–9–5)	Western Michigan (18–11–1)	Cornell (17–8–4)	Cornell (17–8–4)	Cornell (19–9–4)	Cornell (20–10–4)	Notre Dame (23–14–3)	10.
11.	North Dakota	Minnesota State (0–0–0)	Michigan (0–1–0)	Union (4–0–1)	Massachusetts (5–1–0)	North Dakota (4–2–1)	North Dakota (5–3–1)	Union (7–3–1)	Union (8–3–2)	Union (8–3–2)	Northeastern (10–3–1)	Penn State (12–6–2)	Providence (12–6–4)	Notre Dame (13–8–2)	Notre Dame (14–8–3)	Providence (15–8–5)	Clarkson (18–9–0)	Arizona State (21–10–1)	Cornell (16–8–3)	Clarkson (22–10–2)	Clarkson (22–10–2)	Providence (22–11–6)	Providence (22–11–6)	Clarkson (26–11–2)	11.
12.	Boston College	Boston College (0–0–0) (2)	Northeastern (2–0–0)	Michigan (1–2–0)	Michigan (3–2–0)	Union (6–2–1)	Union (7–3–1)	Bowling Green (8–3–2)	Bowling Green (8–3–2)	Bowling Green (10–3–2)	Bowling Green (11–3–3)	Northeastern (12–4–1)	Notre Dame (12–8–1)	Cornell (11–5–1)	Northeastern (15–7–1)	Arizona State (19–10–1)	Arizona State (19–10–1)	Northeastern (19–9–1)	Arizona State (21–10–1)	Western Michigan (18–13–1)	Western Michigan (20–13–1)	Harvard (19–9–3)	Notre Dame (22–13–3)	Ohio State (20–11–5)	12.
13.	Minnesota	North Dakota (0–0–0)	Boston University (0–2–0)	Princeton (0–0–0)	Northeastern (4–2–0)	Quinnipiac (6–1–0)	Northeastern (6–3–1)	Northeastern (7–3–1)	Northeastern (8–3–1)	Northeastern (9–3–1)	North Dakota (9–7–1)	Arizona State (16–7–1)	Penn State (13–7–2)	Western Michigan (13–8–1)	Bowling Green (17–7–3)	Northeastern (15–8–1)	Providence (16–9–5)	Clarkson (20–10–0)	Clarkson (21–10–1)	Arizona State (21–12–1)	Arizona State (21–12–1)	Bowling Green (25–9–5)	Harvard (19–10–3)	Bowling Green (25–11–5)	13.
14.	Princeton	Princeton (0–0–0)	Princeton (0–0–0)	Wisconsin (3–1–0)	North Dakota (2–2–1)	Michigan (4–3–0)	Quinnipiac (7–2–0)	Michigan (6–5–0)	Michigan (6–5–2)	North Dakota (8–6–1)	Union (8–4–3)	Western Michigan (11–6–1)	Clarkson (14–6–0)	Providence (13–7–4)	Cornell (12–6–1)	Notre Dame (14–10–3)	Northeastern (16–9–1)	UMass Lowell (17–10–2)	UMass Lowell (18–10–3)	Harvard (17–9–3)	Harvard (17–9–3)	Arizona State (21–12–1)	Arizona State (21–12–1)	Harvard (19–11–3)	14.
15.	Northeastern	Northeastern (0–0–0)	Wisconsin (2–0–0)	Bowling Green (3–1–0)	Quinnipiac (5–0–0)	Northeastern (4–3–1)	Princeton (3–1–1)	Cornell (5–3–0)	North Dakota (7–5–1)	Michigan (6–6–3)	Arizona State (12–6–0)	Union (10–5–4)	Cornell (9–5–1)	Penn State (13–9–2)	Penn State (14–10–2)	UMass Lowell (15–8–2)	Notre Dame (14–10–3)	Bowling Green (19–8–4)	Bowling Green (20–8–5)	Bowling Green (21–9–5)	Bowling Green (23–9–5)	Western Michigan (21–14–1)	Bowling Green (25–10–5)	Arizona State (21–13–1)	15.
16.	Penn State	Penn State (0–0–0)	North Dakota (0–1–1)	Massachusetts (3–1–0)	Wisconsin (4–2–0)	Minnesota (1–3–1)	Michigan (5–4–0)	Arizona State (10–4–0)	Cornell (5–4–0)	Clarkson (8–5–0)	Miami (9–6–3)	Clarkson (12–6–0)	Union (11–6–4)	Union (11–6–4)	Arizona State (17–10–1)	Bowling Green (18–8–3)	Bowling Green (18–8–3)	Notre Dame (16–11–3)	Harvard (16–8–3)	Notre Dame (18–13–3) т	Notre Dame (20–13–3)	Notre Dame (21–13–3)	Penn State (22–15–2)	American International (23–17–1)	16.
17.	Clarkson	Clarkson (0–0–0)	Bowling Green (3–1–0)	North Dakota (1–2–1)	Union (4–2–1)	Cornell (2–2–0)	Cornell (4–2–0)	North Dakota (5–5–1)	Clarkson (7–4–0)	Miami (9–6–3)	Western Michigan (9–6–1)	Cornell (7–5–1)	Arizona State (16–9–1)	Arizona State (16–9–1)	UMass Lowell (14–8–2)	Harvard (11–6–3)	Penn State (16–10–2)	Harvard (14–8–3)	Notre Dame (17–12–3)	UMass Lowell (18–11–4) т	Penn State (21–14–2)	Penn State (22–14–2)	Western Michigan (21–15–1)	Penn State (22–15–2)	17.
18.	Michigan Tech	Western Michigan (0–0–0)	Boston College (0–2–0)	Northeastern (2–2–0)	Cornell (0–2–0)	Princeton (1–1–1)	Arizona State (9–3–0)	Princeton (3–3–1)	Arizona State (10–6–0)	Cornell (6–5–0)	Yale (7–2–2)	Lake Superior (13–6–1)	Lake Superior (14–6–2)	Lake Superior (15–7–2)	Union (12–7–4)	Penn State (14–10–2)	Harvard (12–7–3)	Lake Superior (20–8–2)	Penn State (18–12–2)	Penn State (19–13–2)	UMass Lowell (18–11–5)	UMass Lowell (19–13–5)	American International (22–16–1)	Western Michigan (21–15–1)	18.
19.	Western Michigan	Michigan Tech (0–0–0)	Western Michigan (2–1–0)	Western Michigan (3–2–0)	Princeton (0–1–0)	Miami (7–3–0)	Minnesota (2–4–1)	Miami (9–5–0)	Princeton (3–4–1)	Arizona State (10–6–0)	Clarkson (9–6–0)	Yale (7–4–3)	Yale (8–5–3)	UMass Lowell (13–8–1)	Harvard (10–6–3)	Lake Superior (18–8–2)	Lake Superior (18–8–2)	Penn State (17–11–2)	Lake Superior (20–10–2)	North Dakota (16–15–2)	North Dakota (18–15–2)	American International (20–16–1)	UMass Lowell (19–13–5)	UMass Lowell (19–13–5)	19.
20.	Northern Michigan	Bowling Green (1–0–0)	Union (2–0–1)	Quinnipiac (3–0–0)	Miami (6–2–0)	Wisconsin (4–4–0)	Miami (8–4–0)	Lake Superior State (6–3–1)	Lake Superior State (7–4–1)	Michigan Tech (8–5–1)	Cornell (6–5–0)	Miami (9–7–4)	North Dakota (11–9–1)	Yale (9–6–3)	Lake Superior (16–8–2)	Union (13–8–5)	Union (14–9–5)	Union (15–9–6)	North Dakota (15–14–2)	Lake Superior (21–11–2)	Lake Superior (23–11–2)	North Dakota (18–17–2)	North Dakota (18–12–2)	North Dakota (18–17–2); Minnesota (18–16–4)	20.
	Preseason Sep 24	Week 1 Oct 8	Week 2 Oct 15	Week 3 Oct 22	Week 4 Oct 29	Week 5 Nov 5	Week 6 Nov 12	Week 7 Nov 19	Week 8 Nov 26	Week 9 Dec 3	Week 10 Dec 10	Week 13 Jan 7	Week 14 Jan 14	Week 15 Jan 21	Week 16 Jan 28	Week 17 Feb 4	Week 18 Feb 11	Week 19 Feb 18	Week 20 Feb 25	Week 21 Mar 4	Week 22 Mar 11	Week 23 Mar 18	Week 24 Mar 25	Final April 15	
		Dropped: Northern Michigan	Dropped: Clarkson; Michigan Tech	Dropped: Boston University; Boston College	Dropped: Western Michigan	None	Dropped: Wisconsin	Dropped: Minnesota	Dropped: Miami	Dropped: Princeton; Lake Superior State	Dropped: Michigan; Michigan Tech	Dropped: North Dakota	Dropped: Miami	Dropped: North Dakota	Dropped: Yale	None	None	None	None	None	None	Dropped: Lake Superior	None	None	

== USA Today ==
	Preseason Oct 1	Week 1 Oct 8	Week 2 Oct 15	Week 3 Oct 22	Week 4 Oct 29	Week 5 Nov 5	Week 6 Nov 12	Week 7 Nov 19	Week 8 Nov 26	Week 9 Dec 3	Week 10 Dec 10	Week 11 Dec 17	Week 12 Dec 31	Week 13 Jan 7	Week 14 Jan 14	Week 15 Jan 21	Week 16 Jan 28	Week 17 Feb 4	Week 18 Feb 11	Week 19 Feb 18	Week 20 Feb 25	Week 21 Mar 4	Week 22 Mar 11	Week 23 Mar 18	Week 24 Mar 25	Week 25 Apr 1	Final Apr 15	
1.	Minnesota–Duluth (30)	Ohio State (0–0–0) (18)	Ohio State (2–0–0) (25)	Notre Dame (3–0–1) (17)	Minnesota–Duluth (6–1–1) (33)	Minnesota–Duluth (6–1–1) (30)	Minnesota–Duluth (8–1–1) (29)	St. Cloud State (11–1–0) (16)	St. Cloud State (11–1–0) (30)	St. Cloud State (11–1–2) (19)	St. Cloud State (13–1–2) (27)	St. Cloud State (13–1–2) (19)	St. Cloud State (13–1–2) (22)	St. Cloud State (14–2–2) (21)	Massachusetts (17–3–0) (31)	St. Cloud State (17–3–2) (27)	St. Cloud State (18–4–2) (31)	St. Cloud State (20–4–2) (33)	St. Cloud State (21–4–3) (30)	St. Cloud State (21–4–3) (29)	St. Cloud State (23–4–3) (32)	St. Cloud State (25–4–3) (32)	St. Cloud State (27–4–3) (32)	St. Cloud State (29–4–3) (33)	St. Cloud State (30–5–3) (34)	Minnesota-Duluth (27–11–2) (21)	Minnesota-Duluth (29–11–2) (34)	1.
2.	Ohio State (3)	Minnesota–Duluth (0–1–1) (7)	Minnesota–Duluth (2–1–1) (3)	Minnesota–Duluth (4–1–1) (6)	St. Cloud State (5–1–0)	St. Cloud State (7–1–0)	St. Cloud State (9–1–0) (5)	Minnesota–Duluth (9–2–1) (5)	Minnesota–Duluth (9–2–1) (2)	Massachusetts (12–1–0) (14)	Massachusetts (13–2–0) (6)	Massachusetts (14–2–0) (15	Massachusetts (14–2–0) (12)	Massachusetts (15–3–0) (12)	St. Cloud State (15–3–2) (3)	Massachusetts (18–4–0) (7)	Massachusetts (19–5–0) (2)	Massachusetts (20–5–0) (1)	Massachusetts (21–6–0) (2)	Massachusetts (23–6–0) (5)	Massachusetts (24–7–0) (2)	Massachusetts (26–7–0) (2)	Massachusetts (26–8–0) (2)	Massachusetts (28–8–0) (1)	Minnesota-Duluth (25–11–2)	Massachusetts (30–9–0) (13)	Massachusetts (31–10–0)	2.
3.	Notre Dame	St. Cloud State (0–0–0) (4)	Notre Dame (1–0–1) (3)	St. Cloud State (4–0–0) (9)	Providence (4–1–1)	Providence (5–1–1)	Minnesota State (7–1–0)	Minnesota State (9–1–0)	Massachusetts (11–1–0) (2)	Minnesota–Duluth (10–3–1) (1)	Minnesota State (14–2–0) (1)	Minnesota–Duluth (10–4–2)	Quinnipiac (15–3–0)	Ohio State (12–4–4)	Denver (14–4–2)	Denver (14–4–3)	Minnesota–Duluth (16–6–2) (1)	Ohio State (17–5–4)	Ohio State (19–5–4) (2)	Minnesota–Duluth (18–8–2)	Minnesota–Duluth (19–9–2)	Minnesota–Duluth (21–9–2)	Minnesota State (29–7–2)	Minnesota State (31–7–2)	Minnesota State (32–7–2)	Denver (24–11–5)	Denver (24–12–5)	3.
4.	St. Cloud State (1)	Notre Dame (0–0–0) (3)	St. Cloud State (2–0–0) (3)	Ohio State (3–1–0) (1)	Minnesota State (5–1–0)	Minnesota State (7–1–0)	Massachusetts (8–1–0)	Massachusetts (10–1–0)	Minnesota State (10–2–0)	Minnesota State (12–2–0)	Minnesota–Duluth (10–4–2)	Quinnipiac (14–3–0)	Ohio State (11–4–3)	Denver (12–4–2)	Minnesota–Duluth (12–6–2)	Ohio State (15–5–4)	Ohio State (15–5–4)	Quinnipiac (20–5–1)	Minnesota–Duluth (17–7–2)	Minnesota State (24–6–2)	Minnesota State (25–7–2)	Minnesota State (27–7–2)	Minnesota–Duluth (21–11–2)	Minnesota–Duluth (23–11–2)	Massachusetts (28–9–0)	Providence (24–11–6)	Providence (24–12–6)	4.
5.	Providence	Providence (1–0–0) (1)	Providence (2–1–0)	Minnesota (1–0–1) (1)	Notre Dame (3–2–1)	Denver (5–0–1)	Penn State (8–1–0)	Ohio State (8–3–1)	Ohio State (9–4–1)	Denver (7–3–2)	Quinnipiac (14–3–0)	Ohio State (9–4–3)	Minnesota–Duluth (11–5–2)	Minnesota–Duluth (11–5–2)	Ohio State (13–5–4)	Minnesota–Duluth (14–6–2)	Quinnipiac (18–5–1)	Minnesota–Duluth (17–7–2)	Quinnipiac (21–6–1)	Ohio State (19–7–4)	Quinnipiac (23–7–2)	Quinnipiac (25–7–2)	Quinnipiac (25–7–2)	Denver (21–10–5)	Northeastern (27–10–1)	St. Cloud State (30–6–3)	St. Cloud State (30–6–3)	5.
6.	Michigan	Minnesota (1–0–1) (1)	Minnesota (1–0–1)	Providence (3–1–1)	Penn State (5–0–0) (1)	Notre Dame (4–3–1)	Ohio State (6–3–1)	Penn State (9–2–0)	Penn State (10–3–0)	Notre Dame (10–4–1)	Ohio State (9–4–3)	Notre Dame (11–5–1)	Notre Dame (11–5–1)	Quinnipiac (15–4–1)	Quinnipiac (16–5–1)	Quinnipiac (17–5–1)	Minnesota State (21–6–1)	Minnesota State (23–6–1)	Minnesota State (24–6–2)	Quinnipiac (22–6–2)	Denver (17–8–4)	Denver (19–8–5)	Ohio State (20–9–5)	Quinnipiac (25–9–2)	Clarkson (26–10–2)	Minnesota State (32–8–2)	Minnesota State (32–8–2)	6.
7.	Cornell	Cornell (0–0–0)	Cornell (0–0–0)	Minnesota State (3–1–0)	Denver (3–0–1)	Ohio State (4–3–1)	Denver (5–2–1)	Denver (6–3–1)	Denver (7–3–2)	Ohio State (9–4–3)	Denver (8–4–2)	Denver (8–4–2)	Denver (10–4–2)	Minnesota State (16–5–1)	Minnesota State (18–5–1)	Minnesota State (19–6–1)	Denver (14–6–3)	Denver (15–6–4)	Denver (15–6–4)	Denver (16–7–4)	Ohio State (19–8–5)	Ohio State (20–9–5)	Denver (19–10–5)	Ohio State (20–10–5)	Denver (22–11–5)	Quinnipiac (26–10–2)	Quinnipiac (26–10–2)	7.
8.	Boston University	Michigan (0–1–0)	Minnesota State (2–0–0)	Cornell (0–0–0)	Minnesota (1–1–1)	Penn State (6–1–0)	Notre Dame (5–4–1)	Notre Dame (7–4–1)	Notre Dame (7–4–1)	Quinnipiac (13–2–0)	Notre Dame (11–5–1)	Minnesota State (14–4–0)	Bowling Green (13–3–3)	Providence (12–4–4)	Northeastern (14–4–1)	Northeastern (15–5–1)	Western Michigan (15–8–1)	Western Michigan (16–9–1)	Cornell (15–6–2)	Cornell (15–7–3)	Providence (19–9–5)	Providence (20–9–6)	Providence (21–9–6)	Northeastern (25–10–1)	Quinnipiac (25–9–2)	Clarkson (26–11–2)	Clarkson (26–11–2)	8.
9.	Boston College	Boston University (0–0–0)	Denver (2–0–0)	Penn State (4–0–0)	Ohio State (3–2–1)	Massachusetts (6–1–0)	Providence (5–3–1)	Providence (7–3–1)	Quinnipiac (11–2–0)	Penn State (10–4–1)	Penn State (11–5–1)	Bowling Green (13–3–3)	Penn State (11–5–2)	Notre Dame (12–6–1)	Bowling Green (15–5–3)	Clarkson (16–6–0)	Providence (15–7–4)	Cornell (13–6–2)	Western Michigan (16–9–1)	Western Michigan (17–10–1)	Northeastern (21–9–1)	Northeastern (22–10–1)	Northeastern (23–10–1)	Clarkson (24–10–2)	Ohio State (20–10–5)	Cornell (21–11–4)	Northeastern (27–11–1)	9.
10.	Minnesota State	Boston College (0–0–0)	Michigan (0–1–0)	Denver (3–0–1)	Bowling Green (5–1–1)	Bowling Green (6–2–1)	Bowling Green (7–2–2)	Quinnipiac (8–2–0)	Providence (7–4–2)	Providence (8–4–3)	Providence (9–4–3)	Penn State (11–5–2)	Providence (11–4–3)	Penn State (12–6–2)	Providence (12–6–4)	Bowling Green (16–6–3)	Clarkson (17–7–0)	Clarkson (18–8–0)	Clarkson (19–9–0)	Arizona State (21–10–1)	Western Michigan (18–11–1)	Cornell (17–8–4)	Cornell (17–8–4)	Cornell (19–9–4)	Cornell (20–10–4)	Northeastern (27–11–1)	Cornell (21–11–4)	10.
11.	Denver	Minnesota State (0–0–0)	Penn State (2–0–0)	Union (4–0–1)	Massachusetts (5–1–0)	North Dakota (4–2–1)	North Dakota (5–3–1)	Bowling Green (8–3–2)	Union (8–3–2)	Union (8–3–2)	Northeastern (10–3–1)	Providence (9–4–3)	Northeastern (12–3–1)	Northeastern (12–4–1)	Western Michigan (13–6–1)	Cornell (11–5–1)	Cornell (12–6–1)	Arizona State (19–10–1)	UMass Lowell (17–8–2)	Providence (18–9–5)	Arizona State (21–10–1)	Clarkson (22–10–2)	Clarkson (22–10–2)	Harvard (19–9–3)	Providence (22–11–6)	Notre Dame (23–14–3)	Ohio State (20–11–5)	11.
12.	North Dakota	North Dakota (0–0–0)	Northeastern (2–0–0)	Michigan (1–2–0)	Quinnipiac (5–0–0)	Quinnipiac (6–1–0)	Union (7–3–1)	Union (7–3–1)	Bowling Green (8–3–2)	Northeastern (9–3–1)	Bowling Green (11–3–3)	Northeastern (10–3–1)	Minnesota State (14–5–1)	Bowling Green (14–4–3)	Penn State (13–7–2)	Notre Dame (13–8–2)	Northeastern (15–7–1)	Providence (15–8–5)	Arizona State (19–10–1)	Clarkson (20–10–0)	Cornell (16–8–3)	Arizona State (21–12–1)	Western Michigan (20–13–1)	Providence (22–11–6)	Notre Dame (22–13–3)	Ohio State (20–11–5)	Notre Dame (23–14–3)	12.
13.	Minnesota	Denver (0–0–0)	Wisconsin (2–0–0)	Wisconsin (3–1–0)	Michigan (3–2–0)	Union (6–2–1)	Princeton (3–1–1)	Northeastern (7–3–1)	Northeastern (8–3–1)	Bowling Green (10–3–2)	Arizona State (12–6–0)	Arizona State (14–6–0)	Arizona State (14–7–1)	Arizona State (16–7–1)	Notre Dame (12–8–1)	Western Michigan (13–8–1)	Notre Dame (14–8–3)	Northeastern (15–8–1)	Providence (16–9–5)	Northeastern (19–9–1)	Clarkson (21–10–1)	Western Michigan (18–13–1)	Arizona State (21–12–1)	Arizona State (21–12–1)	Arizona State (21–12–1)	Harvard (19–11–3)	Harvard (19–11–3)	13.
14.	Princeton	Princeton (0–0–0)	Princeton (0–0–0)	Princeton (0–0–0)	Northeastern (4–2–0)	Minnesota (1–3–1)	Quinnipiac (7–2–0)	Arizona State (10–4–0)	Michigan (6–5–2)	North Dakota (8–6–1)	Union (8–4–3)	Union (8–4–3)	Clarkson (11–6–0)	Western Michigan (11–6–1)	Cornell (9–5–1)	Providence (13–7–4)	Bowling Green (17–7–3)	UMass Lowell (15–8–2) т	Northeastern (16–9–1)	UMass Lowell (17–10–2)	UMass Lowell (18–10–3)	Harvard (17–9–3)	Harvard (17–9–3)	Western Michigan (21–14–1)	Harvard (19–10–3)	Bowling Green (25–11–5)	Bowling Green (25–11–5)	14.
15.	Penn State	Northeastern (0–0–0)	Boston University (0–2–0)	Quinnipiac (3–0–0)	North Dakota (3–2–1)	Michigan (4–3–0)	Northeastern (6–3–1)	Cornell (5–3–0)	North Dakota (7–5–1)	Arizona State (10–6–0)	North Dakota (9–7–1)	Yale (7–3–2)	Yale (7–3–2)	Union (10–5–4)	Clarkson (14–6–0)	Arizona State (16–9–1)	Arizona State (17–10–1)	Notre Dame (14–10–3) т	Harvard (12–7–3)	Harvard (14–8–3)	Harvard (16–8–3)	Notre Dame (18–13–3)	Notre Dame (20–13–3)	Bowling Green (25–9–5)	Bowling Green (25–10–5)	Arizona State (21–13–1)	Arizona State (21–13–1)	15.
	Preseason Oct 1	Week 1 Oct 8	Week 2 Oct 15	Week 3 Oct 22	Week 4 Oct 29	Week 5 Nov 5	Week 6 Nov 12	Week 7 Nov 19	Week 8 Nov 26	Week 9 Dec 3	Week 10 Dec 10	Week 11 Dec 17	Week 12 Dec 31	Week 13 Jan 7	Week 14 Jan 14	Week 15 Jan 21	Week 16 Jan 28	Week 17 Feb 4	Week 18 Feb 11	Week 19 Feb 18	Week 20 Feb 25	Week 21 Mar 4	Week 22 Mar 11	Week 23 Mar 18	Week 24 Mar 25	Week 25 Apr 1	Final Apr 15	
		Dropped: Penn State	Dropped: North Dakota; Boston College	Dropped: Northeastern; Boston University	Dropped: Cornell; Union; Wisconsin; Princeton	Dropped: Northeastern	Dropped: Minnesota; Michigan	Dropped: North Dakota; Princeton	Dropped: Arizona State; Cornell	Dropped: Michigan	None	Dropped: North Dakota	Dropped: Union	Dropped: Clarkson; Cornell	Dropped: Arizona State; Union	Dropped: Penn State	None	Dropped: Bowling Green	Dropped: Notre Dame	None	None	Dropped: UMass Lowell	None	Dropped: Notre Dame	Dropped: Western Michigan	None	None	
