= List of Ferris State Bulldogs men's ice hockey seasons =

This is a season-by-season list of records compiled by Ferris State in men's ice hockey.

Ferris State has made four NCAA Tournament appearances in its history, reaching the championship game in 2012.

== List ==
NCAA D-I Champions	NCAA Frozen Four	Conference regular season champions	Conference Playoff Champions

Season	Conference	Regular season (Note: Code explanation; GP—Games Played, W—Wins, L—Losses, T—Tied games, OTW—Overtime Wins, OTL—Overtime Loses, 3/SW—Win in 3 on 3 overtime or shootout, Pts—Points*)														Conference Tournament Results	National Tournament Results
Season	Conference	Conference									Overall					Conference Tournament Results	National Tournament Results
Season	Conference	GP	W	L	T	OTW	OTL	3/SW	Pts*	Finish	GP	W	L	T	%	Conference Tournament Results	National Tournament Results
NAIA
Rick Duffett (1975 — 1982)
1975–76	Independent	-	-	-	-	-	-	-	-	-	21	15	6	0	.714		
1976–77	Independent	-	-	-	-	-	-	-	-	-	22	17	4	1	.795		Lost NAIA Quarterfinal, 3–10 (Gustavus Adolphus)
1977–78	Independent	-	-	-	-	-	-	-	-	-	22	16	6	0	.727		
1978–79	CCHA†	24	4	20	0	-	-	-	8	7th	34	10	24	0	.294		
NCAA
1979–80	CCHA	20	11	9	0	-	-	-	22	3rd	38	26	11	1	.697	Won CCHA Semifinal series, 12–8 (Ohio State); Lost CCHA Championship series, 15–9 (Northern Michigan)	
1980–81	CCHA	22	13	9	0	-	-	-	26	3rd	36	20	14	2	.583	Lost CCHA Semifinal series, 6–8 (Ohio State)	
1981–82	CCHA	30	13	15	2	-	-	-	28	6th	36	15	18	3	.458	Lost CCHA Quarterfinal series, 7–10 (Michigan Tech)	
Dick Bertrand (1982 — 1986)
1982–83	CCHA	32	12	16	4	-	-	-	28	T–7th	38	16	18	4	.474	Lost CCHA Quarterfinal series, 5–7 (Michigan State)	
1983–84	CCHA	30	13	15	2	-	-	-	.467	T–6th	41	18	20	3	.476	Lost CCHA Quarterfinal series, 3–11 (Ohio State)	
1984–85	CCHA	32	8	23	1	-	-	-	17	9th	38	11	26	1	.303		
Peter Esdale (1986)
1985–86	CCHA	32	13	17	2	-	-	-	28	6th	40‡	17‡	19‡	2‡	.474	Lost CCHA Quarterfinal series, 3–11 (Western Michigan)	
John Perpich (1986 — 1990)
1986–87	CCHA	32	9	23	0	-	-	-	18	8th	43	16	27	0	.372	Lost CCHA Quarterfinal series, 1–2 (Bowling Green)	
1987–88	CCHA	32	11	17	4	-	-	-	26	7th	40	15	20	5	.438	Lost CCHA Quarterfinal series, 0–2 (Bowling Green)	
1988–89	CCHA	32	9	18	5	-	-	-	23	7th	40	12	22	6	.375	Lost CCHA Quarterfinal series, 0–2 (Lake Superior State)	
1989–90	CCHA	32	6	20	6	-	-	-	18	8th	40	11	23	6	.350	Lost CCHA Quarterfinal series, 0–2 (Michigan State)	
Bob Mancini (1990 — 1992)
1990–91	CCHA	32	15	12	5	-	-	-	35	3rd	42	23	14	5	.607	Won CCHA Quarterfinal series, 2–0 (Bowling Green); Lost CCHA Semifinal, 2–5 (Michigan); Lost CCHA consolation game, 1–2 (Western Michigan)	
1991–92	CCHA	32	11	15	6	-	-	-	28	6th	38	13	18	7	.434	Lost CCHA Quarterfinal series, 0–2 (Michigan State)	
Bob Daniels (1992 — 2025)
1992–93	CCHA	30	13	13	4	-	-	-	30	6th	41	21	16	4	.561	Won CCHA first round series, 2–0 (Alaska–Fairbanks); Won CCHA second round, 3–2 (Michigan State); Lost CCHA Semifinal, 3–4 (Miami)	
1993–94	CCHA	30	15	13	2	-	-	-	25	7th	38	14	23	1	.382	Lost CCHA first round series, 0–2 (Bowling Green)	
1994–95	CCHA	27	9	14	4	-	-	-	22	T–6th	36	12	20	4	.389	Lost CCHA first round series, 0–2 (Miami)	
1995–96	CCHA	30	10	17	3	-	-	-	23	6th	38	13	22	3	.382	Lost CCHA Quarterfinal series, 1–2 (Michigan State)	
1996–97	CCHA	27	7	18	2	-	-	-	16	9th	37	11	23	3	.338		
1997–98	CCHA	30	12	15	3	-	-	-	27	8th	39	15	21	3	.423	Lost CCHA Quarterfinal series, 0–2 (Michigan State)	
1998–99	CCHA	30	13	12	5	-	-	-	31	6th	36	14	16	6	.472	Lost CCHA Quarterfinal series, 0–2 (Ohio State)	
1999–00	CCHA	28	13	13	2	-	-	-	28	6th	39	21	16	2	.564	Lost CCHA first round series, 1–2 (Notre Dame)	
2000–01	CCHA	28	9	15	4	-	-	-	22	8th	38	13	20	5	.408	Lost CCHA first round series, 0–2 (Michigan)	
2001–02	CCHA	28	12	15	1	-	-	-	25	9th	36	15	20	1	.431	Lost CCHA first round series, 0–2 (Alaska–Fairbanks)	
2002–03	CCHA	28	22	5	1	-	-	-	45	1st	42	31	10	1	.750	Won CCHA first round series, 2–0 (Lake Superior State); Won CCHA Semifinal, 4–2 (Northern Michigan); Lost CCHA Championship, 3–5 (Michigan)	Won NCAA regional semifinal, 5–2 (North Dakota); Lost NCAA Regional final, 4–7 (Minnesota)
2003–04	CCHA	28	10	17	1	-	-	-	21	10th	38	15	20	3	.434	Lost CCHA first round series, 0–2 (Michigan State)	
2004–05	CCHA	28	7	17	4	-	-	-	18	T–10th	39	13	22	4	.385	Lost CCHA first round series, 1–2 (Ohio State)	
2005–06	CCHA	28	10	11	7	-	-	-	27	T–6th	40	17	15	8	.525	Won CCHA first round series, 2–0 (Ohio State); Lost CCHA Quarterfinal series, 0–2 (Michigan)	
2006–07	CCHA	28	10	16	2	-	-	-	22	9th	39	14	22	3	.397	Lost CCHA first round series, 1–2 (Lake Superior State)	
2007–08	CCHA	28	12	12	4	-	-	-	28	5th	39	18	16	5	.526	Won CCHA first round series, 2–0 (Western Michigan); Lost CCHA Quarterfinal series, 1–2 (Notre Dame)	
2008–09	CCHA	28	9	14	5	-	-	2	25	9th	38	12	19	7	.408	Lost CCHA CCHA first round series, 0–2 (Nebraska–Omaha)	
2009–10	CCHA	28	13	9	6	-	-	4	49	3rd	40	21	13	6	.600	Won CCHA Quarterfinal series, 2–0 (Nebraska-Omaha); Lost CCHA Semifinal, 4–5 (Northern Michigan); Lost CCHA Third Place game, 1–2 (Miami)	
2010–11	CCHA	28	12	12	4	-	-	4	43	5th	39	18	16	5	.526	Lost CCHA Quarterfinal series, 1–2 (Western Michigan)	
2011–12	CCHA	28	16	7	5	-	-	1	54	1st	43	26	12	5	.663	Lost CCHA Quarterfinal series, 1–2 (Bowling Green)	Won NCAA regional semifinal, 2–1 (Denver); Won NCAA Regional final, 2–1 (Cornell); Won NCAA National semifinal, 3–1 (Union); Lost NCAA Championship, 1–4 (Boston College)
2012–13	CCHA	28	13	12	3	-	-	1	43	5th	37	16	16	5	.500	Lost CCHA Quarterfinal series, 1–2 (Ohio State)	
2013–14	WCHA	28	20	6	2	–	-	-	42	1st	43	29	11	3	.709	Won WCHA first round series, 2–0 (Bemidji State); Won WCHA Semifinal, 5–4 (Alaska–Anchorage); Lost WCHA Championship, 1–4 (Minnesota State)	Won NCAA regional semifinal, 1–0 (Colgate); Lost NCAA Regional final, 1–2 (North Dakota)
2014–15	WCHA	28	13	14	1	-	-	–	27	6th	40	18	20	2	.475	Won WCHA first round series, 2–0 (Bemidji State); Lost WCHA semifinals, 0–4 (Minnesota State)	
2015–16	WCHA	28	13	11	4	-	-	–	30	4th	41	20	15	6	.561	Won WCHA first round series, 2–0 (Northern Michigan); Won WCHA semifinals, 1–0 (Michigan Tech); Won WCHA Championship, 2–1 (Minnesota State)	Won NCAA regional semifinal, 5–4 (St. Cloud State); Lost NCAA Regional final, 3–6 (Denver)
2016–17	WCHA	28	12	12	4	-	-	2	42	5th	37	13	19	5	.419	Lost WCHA first round series, 0–2 (Bowling Green)	
2017–18	WCHA	28	11	16	1	-	-	0	34	6th	38	14	23	1	.382	Lost WCHA first round series, 0–2 (Bowling Green)	
2018–19	WCHA	28	7	18	3	-	-	0	24	9th	36	10	23	3	.319		
2019–20	WCHA	28	5	21	2	-	-	0	17	9th	35	7	26	2	.229		
2020–21	WCHA	14	0	13	1	0	1	1	.071	8th	25	1	23	1	.060	Lost WCHA Quarterfinal series, 0–2 (Minnesota State)	
2021–22	CCHA	26	9	16	1	2	2	0	28	7th	36	11	24	1	.319	Lost CCHA Quarterfinal series, 0–2 (Michigan Tech)	
2022–23	CCHA	26	9	14	3	1	2	3	34	6th	37	14	19	4	.432	Won CCHA Quarterfinal series, 2–0 (Bowling Green); Lost CCHA Semifinal, 2–7 (Minnesota State)	
2023–24	CCHA	24	6	17	1	3	2	1	19	8th	36	10	24	2	.306	Lost CCHA Quarterfinal series, 0–2 (Bemidji State)	
2024–25	CCHA	24	12	13	1	1	0	0	.462	T–6th	36	13	20	3	.403	Lost CCHA Quarterfinal series, 0–2 (St. Thomas)	
Brett Riley (2025 — Present)
2025–26	CCHA	24	6	18	2	1	2	1	22	8th	37	8	27	2	.243	Lost CCHA Quarterfinal series, 1–2 (Minnesota State)	
Totals											GP	W	L	T	%	Championships	
Regular season											1804	756	884	164	.465	2 CCHA Championships, 1 WCHA Championship	
Conference Post-season											118	37	78	3	.326	1 GRCL tournament championship, 1 WCHA tournament championship	
NCAA Post-season											10	6	4	0	.600	1 NAIA Tournament appearance, 4 NCAA Tournament appearances	
Regular season and Post-season Record											1896	789	942	165	.460		

* Winning percentage is used when conference schedules are unbalanced.
† Ferris State was still considered an NAIA program in their first year of NCAA play.
‡ Dick Bertrand resigned in January after a 10–11–1 start.
