= 2022–23 Ferris State Bulldogs men's ice hockey season =

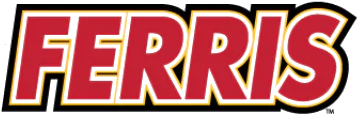
- Conference: 6th CCHA
- Home ice: Ewigleben Arena

Rankings
- USCHO: NR
- USA Today: NR

Record
- Overall: 14–19–4
- Conference: 9–14–3
- Home: 6–11–1
- Road: 7–7–3
- Neutral: 1–1–0

Coaches and captains
- Head coach: Bob Daniels
- Assistant coaches: Drew Famulak; Mark Kaufman

The 2022–23 Ferris State Bulldogs men's ice hockey season was the 48th season of play for the program and the 37th in the Central Collegiate Hockey Association (CCHA). The Bulldogs represented Ferris State University, played their home games at Ewigleben Arena and were coached by Bob Daniels in his 31st season.

== Season ==
Ferris State had a bit of a mixed bag of a season. Noah Giesbrecht, who had joined the club in the middle of the previous year, established himself as the team's starting goaltender. Unfortunately, he got little help from the defense, which allowed more than 33 shots against per game. The offense was able to effectively replace its leading scorer, however, saw no improvement overall.

In the first half of the season the Bulldogs were rather inconsistent but did manage to put together a road sweep of Minnesota State. When they entered the winter break the team possessed a .500 record and were sitting in the top half of the CCHA. The second half of the year wasn't as kind. After a surprising win over Michigan State won just three more times over the next fifteen games and slid down to 6th in the standings.

When they began postseason play, the Bulldogs weren't expected to do much but the team managed to defy expectations. Giesbrecht weathered an 18-shot third period and enabled Ferris State to push Bowling Green into overtime. A goal from Nick Nardecchia put the team on the cusp of a conference semifinal appearance and Giesbrecht was again called upon to save the day. The sophomore held the Falcons scoreless until just over a minute remained in regulation but the team had just enough offense to send the game into extra time. This time Jason Brancheau scored with his team-leading 13th of the season and advanced the Bulldogs for the first time since 2016.

The team's run ended in the second round when top-seeded Minnesota State exacted their revenge with a 2–7 drubbing. Despite the loss, it was still the best season the program had seen in 7 years.

== Departures ==
Player	Position	Nationality	Cause
Nico DeVita	Defenseman	United States	Transferred to New Hampshire
Connor Fedorek	Defenseman	United States	Left program (retired)
Liam MacDougall	Forward	Canada	Graduation (signed with Cincinnati Cyclones)
Carter McPhail	Goaltender	United States	Transferred to Miami
Brendon Michaelian	Defenseman	United States	Graduate transfer to Mercyhurst
Justin Michaelian	Forward	United States	Graduate transfer to Maine
Marshall Moise	Forward	United States	Graduation (retired)
Roni Salmenkangas	Goaltender	Finland	Graduate transfer to Lindenwood
Sam Skinner	Defenseman	United States	Signed professional contract (Idaho Steelheads)
Justin Smith	Defenseman	United States	Graduation (retired)
Ethan Stewart	Forward	United States	Graduation (signed with Tulsa Oilers)
Jake Transit	Forward	United States	Graduation (signed with Orlando Solar Bears)

== Recruiting ==
Player	Position	Nationality	Age	Notes
Jacob Badal	Forward	United States	20	Flushing, MI
Caiden Gault	Forward	Canada	20	Oakbank, MB
Joey Henson	Goaltender	United States	21	Troy, MI
Connor McGrath	Forward	Canada	20	LeRoy, SK
Andrew Noel	Defenseman	United States	21	Maynard, MA
Tyler Schleppe	Forward	Canada	20	Vancouver, BC
Travis Shoudy	Defenseman	United States	20	Marysville, MI
Matt Slick	Defenseman	United States	23	Laredo, TX; graduate transfer from Holy Cross

== Roster ==
As of September 5, 2022.

No.	Nat.	Player	Class	Pos	Height	Weight	DoB	Hometown	Previous team	NHL rights
1	(United States)	Logan Stein	Junior	G	6' 2" (1.88 m)	212 lb (96 kg)	2001-04-26	Suwanee, Georgia	Waterloo Black Hawks (USHL)	—
2	(United States)	Travis Shoudy	Freshman	D	5' 9" (1.75 m)	173 lb (78 kg)	2002-03-15	Marysville, Michigan	Cedar Rapids RoughRiders (USHL)	—
3	(United States)	Ben Schultheis	Junior	D	6' 3" (1.91 m)	207 lb (94 kg)	2000-02-17	Mount Juliet, Tennessee	Dubuque Fighting Saints (USHL)	—
4	(United States)	Drew Cooper	Junior	D	6' 1" (1.85 m)	193 lb (88 kg)	2000-08-28	Ann Arbor, Michigan	Coquitlam Express (BCHL)	—
5	(United States)	Matt Slick	Senior	D	6' 2" (1.88 m)	216 lb (98 kg)	1999-03-13	Buffalo, New York	Holy Cross (AHA)	—
6	(United States)	Blake Evennou	Senior	D	5' 10" (1.78 m)	185 lb (84 kg)	1998-07-09	Macomb, Michigan	Lone Star Brahmas (NAHL)	—
7	(Canada)	Connor McGrath	Freshman	F	5' 9" (1.75 m)	184 lb (83 kg)	2003-09-04	Leroy, Saskatchewan	Humboldt Broncos (SJHL)	—
8	(United States)	Austin McCarthy	Junior	F	6' 0" (1.83 m)	185 lb (84 kg)	1999-03-01	Ludington, Michigan	Topeka Pilots (NAHL)	—
9	(United States)	Nick Nardecchia	Sophomore	F	5' 9" (1.75 m)	177 lb (80 kg)	2001-01-01	Macomb, Michigan	Lincoln Stars (USHL)	—
10	(United States)	Bradley Marek	Sophomore	F	6' 3" (1.91 m)	213 lb (97 kg)	2000-11-13	Big Rapids, Michigan	Muskegon Lumberjacks (USHL)	—
11	(United States)	Jacob Dirks	Junior	F	6' 1" (1.85 m)	190 lb (86 kg)	1999-09-15	Mindoro, Wisconsin	Chippewa Steel (NAHL)	—
12	(United States)	Dallas Tulik	Senior	F	6' 0" (1.83 m)	191 lb (87 kg)	1998-06-23	Kalamazoo, Michigan	Dubuque Fighting Saints (USHL)	—
13	(Canada)	Mitch Deelstra	Junior	F	6' 0" (1.83 m)	191 lb (87 kg)	1999-07-15	Wallace, Ontario	Alberni Valley Bulldogs (BCHL)	—
15	(Canada)	Tyler Schleppe	Freshman	F	6' 4" (1.93 m)	205 lb (93 kg)	2001-11-11	Vancouver, British Columbia	Langley Rivermen (BCHL)	—
16	(Canada)	Caiden Gault	Freshman	F	6' 1" (1.85 m)	191 lb (87 kg)	2002-04-16	Oakbank, Manitoba	Spruce Grove Saints (AJHL)	—
18	(Canada)	Kaleb Ergang	Sophomore	F	5' 10" (1.78 m)	170 lb (77 kg)	2000-12-31	Spruce Grove, Alberta	Whitecourt Wolverines (AJHL)	—
19	(Czech Republic)	Štěpán Pokorný	Junior	F	6' 0" (1.83 m)	198 lb (90 kg)	2000-06-08	Kolín, Czech Republic	Madison Capitols (USHL)	—
20	(United States)	Andrew Noel	Freshman	D	6' 1" (1.85 m)	198 lb (90 kg)	2001-01-02	Maynard, Massachusetts	Nanaimo Clippers (BCHL)	—
21	(United States)	Jason Brancheau	Senior	F	5' 8" (1.73 m)	165 lb (75 kg)	1999-08-15	Brownstown, Michigan	Amarillo Bulls (NAHL)	—
22	(United States)	Luke Farthing	Junior	D	5' 10" (1.78 m)	180 lb (82 kg)	1999-04-21	Stoutsville, Ohio	Chippewa Steel (NAHL)	—
23	(United States)	Antonio Venuto	Junior	F	6' 3" (1.91 m)	205 lb (93 kg)	2000-02-26	Whitmore Lake, Michigan	Dubuque Fighting Saints (USHL)	—
24	(United States)	Brenden MacLaren	Senior	F	5' 11" (1.8 m)	196 lb (89 kg)	1998-11-30	Sault Ste. Marie, Michigan	Fairbanks Ice Dogs (NAHL)	—
25	(United States)	Zach Faremouth	Sophomore	F	6' 4" (1.93 m)	218 lb (99 kg)	2000-01-04	Jackson, Michigan	Des Moines Buccaneers (USHL)	—
26	(United States)	Jacob Badal	Freshman	F	6' 0" (1.83 m)	196 lb (89 kg)	2001-10-05	Flushing, Michigan	Johnstown Tomahawks (NAHL)	—
27	(Canada)	Cade Kowalski	Senior	F	6' 0" (1.83 m)	183 lb (83 kg)	1999-06-15	Morden, Manitoba	Flin Flon Bombers (SJHL)	—
28	(United States)	Brenden Rons	Senior	D	6' 6" (1.98 m)	226 lb (103 kg)	1998-03-03	Farmington Hills, Michigan	Topeka Pilots (NAHL)	—
30	(United States)	Joey Henson	Freshman	G	5' 9" (1.75 m)	157 lb (71 kg)	2001-08-15	Troy, Michigan	Philadelphia Little Flyers (EHL)	—
31	(Canada)	Noah Giesbrecht	Sophomore	G	6' 4" (1.93 m)	202 lb (92 kg)	1999-04-18	White Rock, British Columbia	Windsor (OUA)	—
34	(United States)	Nick Grimaldi	Sophomore	F	5' 7" (1.7 m)	142 lb (64 kg)	1999-06-26	Plymouth, Michigan	Odessa Jackalopes (NAHL)	—

== Standings ==
2022–23 Central Collegiate Hockey Association Standings
	Conference record										Overall record					
	GP	W	L	T	OTW	OTL	SW	PTS	GF	GA	GP	W	L	T	GF	GA
#12 Minnesota State †*	26	16	9	1	2	4	1	52	83	56	39	25	13	1	126	81
#13 Michigan Tech	26	15	7	4	0	1	0	50	68	54	39	24	11	4	103	88
Bowling Green	26	12	12	2	0	2	1	41	89	76	36	15	19	2	114	114
Northern Michigan	26	14	12	0	3	0	0	39	82	77	38	21	17	0	123	103
Bemidji State	26	12	11	3	3	1	2	39	73	63	36	14	17	5	94	97
Ferris State	26	9	14	3	1	2	3	34	62	91	37	14	19	4	92	131
St. Thomas	26	10	14	2	1	1	0	32	69	81	36	11	23	2	86	117
Lake Superior State	26	8	17	1	2	1	1	25	52	80	36	9	25	2	71	118
Championship: March 18, 2023 † indicates conference regular season champion (MacNaughton Cup) * indicates conference tournament champion (Mason Cup); Rankings: USCHO.com Top 20 Poll

== Schedule and results ==
Date	Time	Opponent^{#}	Rank^{#}	Site	TV	Decision	Result	Attendance	Record
Regular Season
October 1	5:05 PM	at Miami*		Steve Cady Arena • Oxford, Ohio		Stein	T 2–2 ^{OT}	2,805	0–0–1
October 2	3:05 PM	at Miami*		Steve Cady Arena • Oxford, Ohio		Giesbrecht	L 1–4	1,181	0–1–1
October 7	7:07 PM	Michigan Tech*		Ewigleben Arena • Big Rapids, Michigan	FloHockey	Stein	W 2–1	1,804	1–1–1
October 8	7:07 PM	#18 Western Michigan*		Ewigleben Arena • Big Rapids, Michigan	FloHockey	Stein	L 4–6	1,604	1–2–1
October 14	7:07 PM	Canisius*		Ewigleben Arena • Big Rapids, Michigan	FloHockey	Stein	L 3–5	1,643	1–3–1
October 15	7:07 PM	Canisius*		Ewigleben Arena • Big Rapids, Michigan	FloHockey	Giesbrecht	W 4–1	1,656	2–3–1
October 28	7:07 PM	St. Thomas		Ewigleben Arena • Big Rapids, Michigan	FloHockey	Stein	W 3–2 ^{OT}	1,847	3–3–1 (1–0–0)
October 29	6:07 PM	St. Thomas		Ewigleben Arena • Big Rapids, Michigan	FloHockey	Giesbrecht	L 2–5	1,823	3–4–1 (1–1–0)
November 4	8:07 PM	at #20 Bemidji State		Sanford Center • Bemidji, Minnesota	FloHockey	Stein	T 2–2 ^{SOW}	2,036	3–4–2 (1–1–1)
November 5	7:07 PM	at #20 Bemidji State		Sanford Center • Bemidji, Minnesota	FloHockey	Giesbrecht	L 1–2 ^{OT}	1,639	3–5–2 (1–2–1)
November 12	1:00 PM	Mercyhurst*		Ewigleben Arena • Big Rapids, Michigan (Exhibition)	FloHockey	Giesbrecht	W 5–1	1,872	
November 18	7:07 PM	Bowling Green		Ewigleben Arena • Big Rapids, Michigan	FloHockey	Stein	L 0–6	1,497	3–6–2 (1–3–1)
November 19	7:07 PM	Bowling Green		Ewigleben Arena • Big Rapids, Michigan	FloHockey	Giesbrecht	W 4–1	1,904	4–6–2 (2–3–1)
December 2	8:07 PM	at #11 Minnesota State		Mayo Clinic Health System Event Center • Mankato, Minnesota	KEYC	Giesbrecht	W 2–1	4,199	5–6–2 (3–3–1)
December 3	7:07 PM	at #11 Minnesota State		Mayo Clinic Health System Event Center • Mankato, Minnesota	KEYC	Stein	W 3–2	4,318	6–6–2 (4–3–1)
December 9	7:07 PM	Northern Michigan		Ewigleben Arena • Big Rapids, Michigan	FloHockey	Giesbrecht	W 5–2	1,891	7–6–2 (5–3–1)
December 10	6:07 PM	Northern Michigan		Ewigleben Arena • Big Rapids, Michigan	FloHockey	Stein	L 2–5	2,001	7–7–2 (5–4–1)
December 16	8:07 PM	at St. Thomas		St. Thomas Ice Arena • Mendota Heights, Minnesota	FloHockey	Giesbrecht	L 4–7	615	7–8–2 (5–5–1)
December 17	7:07 PM	at St. Thomas		St. Thomas Ice Arena • Mendota Heights, Minnesota	FloHockey	Giesbrecht	W 4–2	645	8–8–2 (6–5–1)
Great Lakes Invitational
December 27	7:00 PM	vs. #11 Michigan State*		Van Andel Arena • Grand Rapids, Michigan (Great Lakes Invitational Semifinal)		Giesbrecht	W 4–2	-	9–8–2
December 28	7:00 PM	vs. #18 Western Michigan*		Van Andel Arena • Grand Rapids, Michigan (Great Lakes Invitational Championship)		Stein	L 2–8	6,486	9–9–2
January 13	7:07 PM	at Lake Superior State		Taffy Abel Arena • Sault Ste. Marie, Michigan	FloHockey	Giesbrecht	W 4–0	1,669	10–9–2 (7–5–1)
January 14	6:07 PM	at Lake Superior State		Taffy Abel Arena • Sault Ste. Marie, Michigan	FloHockey	Giesbrecht	L 1–4	1,213	10–10–2 (7–6–1)
January 20	7:07 PM	#14 Michigan Tech		Ewigleben Arena • Big Rapids, Michigan	FloHockey	Giesbrecht	L 0–1	2,156	10–11–2 (7–7–1)
January 21	6:07 PM	#14 Michigan Tech		Ewigleben Arena • Big Rapids, Michigan	FloHockey	Stein	T 3–3 ^{SOW}	2,501	10–11–3 (7–7–2)
January 27	7:07 PM	#14 Minnesota State		Ewigleben Arena • Big Rapids, Michigan	FloHockey	Giesbrecht	L 1–4	1,571	10–12–3 (7–8–2)
January 28	6:07 PM	#14 Minnesota State		Ewigleben Arena • Big Rapids, Michigan	FloHockey	Stein	L 1–5	1,897	10–13–3 (7–9–2)
February 3	7:07 PM	at Bowling Green		Slater Family Ice Arena • Bowling Green, Ohio	FloHockey	Giesbrecht	W 2–1	3,211	11–13–3 (8–9–2)
February 4	7:07 PM	at Bowling Green		Slater Family Ice Arena • Bowling Green, Ohio	FloHockey	Giesbrecht	T 4–4 ^{SOW}	3,706	11–13–4 (8–9–3)
February 10	7:07 PM	Bemidji State		Ewigleben Arena • Big Rapids, Michigan	FloHockey	Giesbrecht	W 3–2	1,947	12–13–4 (9–9–3)
February 11	6:07 PM	Bemidji State		Ewigleben Arena • Big Rapids, Michigan	FloHockey	Giesbrecht	L 2–6	1,847	12–14–4 (9–10–3)
February 17	7:07 PM	at Northern Michigan		Berry Events Center • Marquette, Michigan	FloHockey	Giesbrecht	L 2–9	2,464	12–15–4 (9–11–3)
February 18	6:07 PM	at Northern Michigan		Berry Events Center • Marquette, Michigan	FloHockey	Stein	L 3–8	3,779	12–16–4 (9–12–3)
February 24	7:07 PM	Lake Superior State		Ewigleben Arena • Big Rapids, Michigan	FloHockey	Giesbrecht	L 2–3 ^{OT}	1,904	12–17–4 (9–13–3)
February 25	5:07 PM	Lake Superior State		Ewigleben Arena • Big Rapids, Michigan	FloHockey	Giesbrecht	L 2–4	2,398	12–18–4 (9–14–3)
CCHA Tournament
March 3	7:07 PM	at Bowling Green*		Slater Family Ice Arena • Bowling Green, Ohio (Quarterfinal Game 1)	FloHockey	Giesbrecht	W 4–3 ^{OT}	1,686	13–18–4
March 4	7:07 PM	at Bowling Green*		Slater Family Ice Arena • Bowling Green, Ohio (Quarterfinal Game 2)	FloHockey	Giesbrecht	W 2–1 ^{OT}	1,638	14–18–4
March 11	7:07 PM	at #13 Minnesota State*		Mayo Clinic Health System Event Center • Mankato, Minnesota (Semifinal)	FloHockey	Giesbrecht	L 2–7	4,468	14–19–4
*Non-conference game. ^{#}Rankings from USCHO.com Poll. All times are in Eastern Time. Source:

== Scoring statistics ==
Name	Position	Games	Goals	Assists	Points	PIM
Jason Brancheau	F	35	13	8	21	14
Štěpán Pokorný	F	36	6	15	21	33
Bradley Marek	F	37	8	10	18	12
Brenden MacLaren	F	36	4	12	16	18
Tyler Schleppe	F	36	9	6	15	14
Antonio Venuto	RW	35	6	9	15	14
Blake Evennou	D	36	1	14	15	18
Connor McGrath	C	33	8	6	14	14
Mitchel Deelstra	LW	35	8	6	14	47
Travis Shoudy	RW	34	4	7	11	16
Matt Slick	F	34	4	7	11	17
Nick Nardecchia	RW	36	3	8	11	27
Drew Cooper	D	33	0	8	8	16
Caiden Gault	F	20	3	4	7	12
Jacob Dirks	F	24	2	5	7	10
Ben Schultheis	D	34	1	6	7	16
Dallas Tulik	F	19	3	3	6	24
Andrew Noel	D	22	2	3	5	14
Cade Kowalski	C/RW	20	3	1	4	0
Luke Farthing	D	20	1	3	4	25
Kaleb Ergang	RW	19	1	2	3	10
Zach Faremouth	F	27	0	3	3	22
Jacob Badal	LW	18	1	1	2	2
Noah Giesbrecht	G	28	0	2	2	2
Austin McCarthy	F	7	1	0	1	0
Joey Henson	G	1	0	0	0	0
Brenden Rons	D	11	0	0	0	0
Logan Stein	G	14	0	0	0	0
Total			92	148	240	411

== Goaltending statistics ==
Name	Games	Minutes	Wins	Losses	Ties	Goals against	Saves	Shut outs	SV %	GAA
Noah Giesbrecht	33	1560:27	11	12	1	80	775	0	.906	3.08
Logan Stein	18	697:13	3	7	3	45	327	0	.879	3.87
Empty Net	-	6:57	-	-	-	6	-	-	-	-
Total	37	2264:37	14	19	4	131	1102	0	.894	3.47

== Rankings ==
Poll	Week																											
Poll	Pre	1	2	3	4	5	6	7	8	9	10	11	12	13	14	15	16	17	18	19	20	21	22	23	24	25	26	27 (Final)
USCHO.com	NR	-	NR	NR	NR	NR	NR	NR	NR	NR	NR	NR	NR	-	NR	NR	NR	NR	NR	NR	NR	NR	NR	NR	NR	NR	-	NR
USA Today	NR	NR	NR	NR	NR	NR	NR	NR	NR	NR	NR	NR	NR	NR	NR	NR	NR	NR	NR	NR	NR	NR	NR	NR	NR	NR	NR	NR

Note: USCHO did not release a poll in weeks 1, 13, or 26.
