= 2023–24 Ferris State Bulldogs men's ice hockey season =

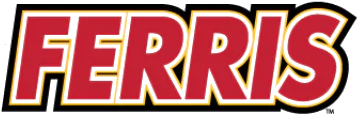
- Conference: 8th CCHA
- Home ice: Ewigleben Arena

Rankings
- USCHO: NR
- USA Hockey: NR

Record
- Overall: 10–24–2
- Conference: 6–17–1
- Home: 5–10–2
- Road: 5–12–0
- Neutral: 0–2–0

Coaches and captains
- Head coach: Bob Daniels
- Assistant coaches: Drew Famulak; Mark Kaufman; Dave Cencer
- Captain: Brenden MacLaren
- Alternate captain(s): Jason Brancheau; Nick Hale; Štěpán Pokorný

The 2023–24 Ferris State Bulldogs men's ice hockey season was the 49th season of play for the program and the 38th in the Central Collegiate Hockey Association (CCHA). The Bulldogs represent Ferris State University, played their home games at Ewigleben Arena and were coached by Bob Daniels in his 32nd season.

== Season ==
Ferris State began the year with a stretch of up-and-down hockey. In the first two months of the season, the offense was middling but consistent. The goaltending duties were split between Logan Stein and Noah Giesbrecht with both providing reliable netminding. By early December, the team was near .500 and had shown signs of improvement. Unfortunately, that was when their season began to unravel. A dip in scoring resulted in seven game losing streak that set the team at the bottom of the standings, where they would remain for the rest of the year.

The team recovered a bit after the Great Lakes Invitational, earning a split with league champion Bemidji State and then winning four in a row to close out January. However, the scoring faltered for a second time afterwards and the team was unable to win any of its final nine games.

Despite its poor finish, Ferris State was nearly able to pull off an upset in the first round of the conference tournament. Twice the team was able to get a 2-goal advantage in their opening game against Bemidji State but they were unable to hold onto either of their leads. The overtime goal appeared to sap whatever energy the team had left and they were swept out of the conference tournament with an 0–4 loss.

== Departures ==
Player	Position	Nationality	Cause
Mitchel Deelstra	Forward	Canada	Transferred to Northern Michigan
Blake Evennou	Defenseman	United States	Graduation (signed with Atlanta Gladiators)
Luke Farthing	Defenseman	United States	Transferred to Canisius
Cade Kowalski	Forward	Canada	Graduate transfer to Prince Edward Island
Bradley Marek	Forward	United States	Signed professional contract (San Jose Barracuda)
Brenden Rons	Defenseman	United States	Graduate transfer to Lindenwood
Matt Slick	Defenseman	United States	Graduation (signed with Adirondack Thunder)
Dallas Tulik	Forward	United States	Graduate transfer to Robert Morris

== Recruiting ==
Player	Position	Nationality	Age	Notes
Luigi Benincasa	Forward	Canada	20	Edmonton, AB
Nico DeVita	Defenseman	United States	22	Bellevue, WA; transfer from New Hampshire
Holden Doell	Forward	Canada	19	Martensville SK
Emerson Goode	Forward	United States	20	Anaheim, CA
Nick Hale	Defenseman	United States	24	Raleigh, NC; graduate transfer from Holy Cross
Jack Mesic	Defenseman	United States	20	Plymouth, MI
Trevor Taulien	Defenseman	United States	20	Crystal Lake, IL

== Roster ==
As of September 18, 2023.

No.	Nat.	Player	Class	Pos	Height	Weight	DoB	Hometown	Previous team	NHL rights
1	(United States)	Logan Stein	Senior	G	6' 2" (1.88 m)	212 lb (96 kg)	2001-04-26	Suwanee, Georgia	Waterloo Black Hawks (USHL)	—
2	(United States)	Travis Shoudy	Sophomore	D	5' 9" (1.75 m)	173 lb (78 kg)	2002-03-15	Marysville, Michigan	Cedar Rapids RoughRiders (USHL)	—
3	(United States)	Ben Schultheis	Junior	D	6' 3" (1.91 m)	207 lb (94 kg)	2000-02-17	Mount Juliet, Tennessee	Dubuque Fighting Saints (USHL)	—
4	(United States)	Drew Cooper	Senior	D	6' 1" (1.85 m)	193 lb (88 kg)	2000-08-28	Ann Arbor, Michigan	Coquitlam Express (BCHL)	—
6	(United States)	Nico DeVita	Junior	D	6' 2" (1.88 m)	202 lb (92 kg)	2001-05-24	Bellevue, Washington	New Hampshire (HEA)	—
6	(United States)	Jack Mesic	Freshman	D	5' 9" (1.75 m)	176 lb (80 kg)	2002-10-18	Plymouth, Michigan	North Iowa Bulls (NAHL)	—
7	(Canada)	Connor McGrath	Sophomore	F	5' 9" (1.75 m)	184 lb (83 kg)	2003-09-04	Leroy, Saskatchewan	Humboldt Broncos (SJHL)	—
8	(United States)	Austin McCarthy	Senior	F	6' 0" (1.83 m)	185 lb (84 kg)	1999-03-01	Ludington, Michigan	Topeka Pilots (NAHL)	—
9	(United States)	Nick Nardecchia	Junior	F	5' 9" (1.75 m)	177 lb (80 kg)	2001-01-01	Macomb, Michigan	Lincoln Stars (USHL)	—
10	(Canada)	Holden Doell	Freshman	F	5' 11" (1.8 m)	185 lb (84 kg)	2003-12-01	Martensville, Saskatchewan	Battlefords North Stars (SJHL)	—
11	(United States)	Jacob Dirks	Senior	F	6' 1" (1.85 m)	190 lb (86 kg)	1999-09-15	Mindoro, Wisconsin	Chippewa Steel (NAHL)	—
12	(Canada)	Luigi Benincasa	Freshman	F	5' 7" (1.7 m)	159 lb (72 kg)	2002-10-07	Edmonton, Alberta	Spruce Grove Saints (AJHL)	—
15	(Canada)	Tyler Schleppe	Sophomore	F	6' 4" (1.93 m)	220 lb (100 kg)	2001-11-11	Vancouver, British Columbia	Langley Rivermen (BCHL)	—
16	(Canada)	Caiden Gault	Sophomore	F	6' 1" (1.85 m)	190 lb (86 kg)	2002-04-16	Oakbank, Manitoba	Spruce Grove Saints (AJHL)	—
18	(Canada)	Kaleb Ergang	Junior	F	5' 10" (1.78 m)	165 lb (75 kg)	2000-12-31	Spruce Grove, Alberta	Whitecourt Wolverines (AJHL)	—
19	(Czech Republic)	Štěpán Pokorný (A)	Senior	F	6' 0" (1.83 m)	196 lb (89 kg)	2000-06-08	Kolín, Czech Republic	Madison Capitols (USHL)	—
20	(United States)	Andrew Noel	Sophomore	D	6' 1" (1.85 m)	200 lb (91 kg)	2001-01-02	Maynard, Massachusetts	Nanaimo Clippers (BCHL)	—
21	(United States)	Jason Brancheau (A)	Graduate	F	5' 8" (1.73 m)	175 lb (79 kg)	1999-08-15	Brownstown, Michigan	Amarillo Bulls (NAHL)	—
22	(United States)	Nick Hale (A)	Senior	D	5' 8" (1.73 m)	168 lb (76 kg)	1999-05-07	Raleigh, North Carolina	Holy Cross (AHA)	—
23	(United States)	Antonio Venuto	Senior	F	6' 3" (1.91 m)	215 lb (98 kg)	2000-02-26	Whitmore Lake, Michigan	Dubuque Fighting Saints (USHL)	—
24	(United States)	Brenden MacLaren (C)	Graduate	F	5' 11" (1.8 m)	196 lb (89 kg)	1998-11-30	Sault Ste. Marie, Michigan	Fairbanks Ice Dogs (NAHL)	—
25	(United States)	Zach Faremouth	Junior	F	6' 3" (1.91 m)	210 lb (95 kg)	2000-01-04	Jackson, Michigan	Des Moines Buccaneers (USHL)	—
26	(United States)	Jacob Badal	Sophomore	F	6' 0" (1.83 m)	205 lb (93 kg)	2001-10-05	Flushing, Michigan	Johnstown Tomahawks (NAHL)	—
27	(United States)	Emerson Goode	Freshman	F	5' 9" (1.75 m)	180 lb (82 kg)	2002-10-16	Anaheim, California	Odessa Jackalopes (NAHL)	—
28	(United States)	Trevor Taulien	Freshman	D	6' 4" (1.93 m)	217 lb (98 kg)	2003-04-14	Crystal Lake, Illinois	Odessa Jackalopes (NAHL)	—
30	(United States)	Joey Henson	Sophomore	G	5' 11" (1.8 m)	196 lb (89 kg)	2001-08-15	Troy, Michigan	Philadelphia Little Flyers (EHL)	—
31	(Canada)	Noah Giesbrecht	Junior	G	6' 4" (1.93 m)	205 lb (93 kg)	1999-04-18	White Rock, British Columbia	Windsor (OUA)	—
34	(United States)	Nick Grimaldi	Junior	F	5' 7" (1.7 m)	140 lb (64 kg)	1999-06-26	Plymouth, Michigan	Odessa Jackalopes (NAHL)	—

== Standings ==
2023–24 Central Collegiate Hockey Association Standings
	Conference record										Overall record					
	GP	W	L	T	OTW	OTL	SW	PTS	GF	GA	GP	W	L	T	GF	GA
Bemidji State †	24	15	7	2	2	1	2	48	82	64	38	20	16	2	117	111
St. Thomas	24	12	11	1	0	2	0	39	68	62	37	15	20	2	97	105
#19 Michigan Tech*	24	12	10	2	1	2	0	39	63	54	40	19	15	6	109	102
Minnesota State	24	12	10	2	2	1	1	38	73	62	37	18	15	4	111	96
Northern Michigan	24	10	10	4	1	1	2	36	57	67	34	12	16	6	83	105
Bowling Green	24	11	12	1	1	1	1	35	60	69	36	13	22	1	86	116
Lake Superior State	24	11	12	1	2	2	0	34	79	73	38	17	20	1	114	113
Ferris State	24	6	17	1	3	2	1	19	49	80	36	10	24	2	83	125
Augustana ^	0	0	0	0	0	0	0	0	0	0	34	12	18	4	90	105
Championship: March 22, 2024 † indicates conference regular season champion (MacNaughton Cup) * indicates conference tournament champion (Mason Cup)^ Augustana is playing a transition schedule of 16 games against conference opponents that are not counted in the standings Rankings: USCHO.com Top 20 Poll

== Schedule and results ==
Date	Time	Opponent^{#}	Rank^{#}	Site	TV	Decision	Result	Attendance	Record
Regular season
October 7	7:07 pm	Miami*		Ewigleben Arena • Big Rapids, Michigan	FloHockey	Giesbrecht	W 5–4 ^{OT}	1,678	1–0–0
October 8	5:07 pm	Miami*		Ewigleben Arena • Big Rapids, Michigan	FloHockey	Giesbrecht	L 2–5	1,250	1–1–0
October 12	7:00 pm	at #12 Western Michigan*		Lawson Arena • Kalamazoo, Michigan		Giesbrecht	L 4–6	3,640	1–2–0
October 13	7:07 pm	#12 Western Michigan*		Ewigleben Arena • Big Rapids, Michigan	FloHockey	Stein	T 3–3 ^{OT}	1,675	1–2–1
October 20	7:07 pm	Grand Valley State*		Ewigleben Arena • Big Rapids, Michigan (Exhibition)	FloHockey	Stein	W 9–0	1,910	
October 27	7:07 pm	at Northern Michigan		Berry Events Center • Marquette, Michigan	FloHockey	Giesbrecht	W 2–1 ^{OT}	4,040	2–2–1 (1–0–0)
October 28	6:07 pm	at Northern Michigan		Berry Events Center • Marquette, Michigan	FloHockey	Stein	L 1–4	4,135	2–3–1 (1–1–0)
November 3	7:07 pm	St. Lawrence*		Ewigleben Arena • Big Rapids, Michigan	FloHockey	Giesbrecht	L 2–5	1,640	2–4–1
November 4	6:07 pm	St. Lawrence*		Ewigleben Arena • Big Rapids, Michigan	FloHockey	Stein	W 2–1 ^{OT}	1,712	3–4–1
November 10	7:07 pm	Minnesota State		Ewigleben Arena • Big Rapids, Michigan	FloHockey	Giesbrecht	L 2–6	1,537	3–5–1 (1–2–0)
November 11	6:07 pm	Minnesota State		Ewigleben Arena • Big Rapids, Michigan	FloHockey	Stein	L 2–3 ^{OT}	—	3–6–1 (1–3–0)
November 17	7:07 pm	at Michigan Tech		MacInnes Student Ice Arena • Houghton, Michigan	FloHockey	Stein	W 3–2 ^{OT}	2,379	4–6–1 (2–3–0)
November 18	6:07 pm	at Michigan Tech		MacInnes Student Ice Arena • Houghton, Michigan	FloHockey	Stein	L 2–3	2,279	4–7–1 (2–4–0)
December 1	7:07 pm	St. Thomas		Ewigleben Arena • Big Rapids, Michigan	FloHockey	Stein	W 5–2	1,754	5–7–1 (3–4–0)
December 2	6:07 pm	St. Thomas		Ewigleben Arena • Big Rapids, Michigan	FloHockey	Giesbrecht	L 1–7	1,834	5–8–1 (3–5–0)
December 8	7:07 pm	at Bowling Green		Slater Family Ice Arena • Bowling Green, Ohio	FloHockey	Stein	L 0–1	1,836	5–9–1 (3–6–0)
December 9	7:07 pm	at Bowling Green		Slater Family Ice Arena • Bowling Green, Ohio	FloHockey	Stein	L 3–4	1,816	5–10–1 (3–7–0)
December 16	6:07 pm	Lake Superior State		Ewigleben Arena • Big Rapids, Michigan	FloHockey	Stein	L 1–5	1,492	5–11–1 (3–8–0)
Great Lakes Invitational
December 28	7:00 pm	vs. #7 Michigan State*		Van Andel Arena • Grand Rapids, Michigan (Great Lakes Invitational Semifinal)	FloHockey	Stein	L 1–4	7,950	5–12–1
December 29	3:30 pm	vs. Alaska*		Van Andel Arena • Grand Rapids, Michigan (Great Lakes Invitational Consolation Game)	FloHockey	Giesbrecht	L 2–3	—	5–13–1
January 5	7:07 pm	Bemidji State		Ewigleben Arena • Big Rapids, Michigan	FloHockey	Stein	L 1–4	1,504	5–14–1 (3–9–0)
January 6	6:07 pm	Bemidji State		Ewigleben Arena • Big Rapids, Michigan	FloHockey	Giesbrecht	W 5–3	1,734	6–14–1 (4–9–0)
January 12	8:07 pm	at Minnesota State		Mayo Clinic Health System Event Center • Mankato, Minnesota	FloHockey	Stein	L 2–4	4,244	6–15–1 (4–10–0)
January 13	7:07 pm	at Minnesota State		Mayo Clinic Health System Event Center • Mankato, Minnesota	FloHockey	Giesbrecht	L 0–4	4,615	6–16–1 (4–11–0)
January 19	7:07 pm	Lake Superior State		Ewigleben Arena • Big Rapids, Michigan	FloHockey	Stein	W 3–5	2,040	7–16–1 (5–11–0)
January 20	6:07 pm	at Lake Superior State		Taffy Abel Arena • Sault Ste. Marie, Michigan	FloHockey	Giesbrecht	W 3–2 ^{OT}	1,112	8–16–1 (6–11–0)
January 26	8:07 pm	at Augustana*		Midco Arena • Sioux Falls, South Dakota	FloHockey	Stein	W 5–2	3,183	9–16–1
January 27	7:07 pm	at Augustana*		Midco Arena • Sioux Falls, South Dakota	FloHockey	Giesbrecht	W 4–3 ^{OT}	3,141	10–16–1
February 2	7:07 pm	Bowling Green		Ewigleben Arena • Big Rapids, Michigan	FloHockey	Stein	L 3–4	1,901	10–17–1 (6–12–0)
February 3	6:07 pm	Bowling Green		Ewigleben Arena • Big Rapids, Michigan	FloHockey	Giesbrecht	L 1–3	2,275	10–18–1 (6–13–0)
February 15	8:07 pm	at Bemidji State		Sanford Center • Bemidji, Minnesota	FloHockey	Stein	L 2–3 ^{OT}	1,256	10–19–1 (6–14–0)
February 16	7:07 pm	at Bemidji State		Sanford Center • Bemidji, Minnesota	FloHockey	Giesbrecht	L 1–4	2,153	10–20–1 (6–15–0)
February 23	7:07 pm	Northern Michigan		Ewigleben Arena • Big Rapids, Michigan	FloHockey	Stein	L 2–3	1,950	10–21–1 (6–16–0)
February 24	5:07 pm	Northern Michigan		Ewigleben Arena • Big Rapids, Michigan	FloHockey	Giesbrecht	T 1–1 ^{SOW}	2,389	10–21–2 (6–16–1)
March 1	7:07 pm	at Lake Superior State		Taffy Abel Arena • Sault Ste. Marie, Michigan	FloHockey	Giesbrecht	L 1–4	1,122	10–22–2 (6–17–1)
CCHA Tournament
March 8	8:07 pm	at Bemidji State*		Sanford Center • Bemidji, Minnesota (Quarterfinal Game 1)	FloHockey	Giesbrecht	L 4–5 ^{OT}	1,725	10–23–2
March 9	7:07 pm	at Bemidji State*		Sanford Center • Bemidji, Minnesota (Quarterfinal Game 2)	FloHockey	Stein	L 0–4	2,176	10–24–2
*Non-conference game. ^{#}Rankings from USCHO.com Poll. All times are in Eastern Time. Source:

== Scoring statistics ==
Name	Position	Games	Goals	Assists	Points	PIM
Antonio Venuto	RW	36	12	14	26	44
Luigi Benincasa	F	33	6	16	22	6
Travis Shoudy	D	36	4	17	21	14
Štěpán Pokorný	F	36	8	10	18	26
Jason Brancheau	F	35	9	7	16	16
Kaleb Ergang	RW	34	6	9	15	10
Zach Faremouth	F	34	6	6	12	24
Emerson Goode	C/W	32	7	5	12	24
Jack Mesic	D	36	2	8	10	8
Tyler Schleppe	F	25	3	7	10	11
Nick Hale	D	34	2	6	8	12
Trevor Taulien	D	27	2	6	8	20
Nick Nardecchia	RW	34	3	4	7	27
Jacob Dirks	F	27	3	4	7	2
Austin McCarthy	F	20	3	2	5	4
Caiden Gault	F	19	2	3	5	4
Drew Cooper	D	24	2	3	5	4
Connor McGrath	C	28	1	3	4	6
Holden Doell	F	24	1	3	4	12
Andrew Noel	D	35	1	3	4	4
Brenden MacLaren	F	27	0	2	2	11
Ben Schultheis	D	21	0	2	2	6
Jacob Badal	LW	5	0	0	0	0
Nico DeVita	D	19	0	0	0	2
Noah Giesbrecht	G	18	0	0	0	0
Logan Stein	G	21	0	0	0	0
Total			83	140	223	303

== Goaltending statistics ==
Name	Games	Minutes	Wins	Losses	Ties	Goals Against	Saves	Shut Outs	SV %	GAA
Logan Stein	22	1219:18	5	13	1	59	595	0	.910	2.90
Noah Giesbrecht	19	960:41	5	11	1	62	480	0	.886	3.87
Empty Net	-	14:57	-	-	-	1	-	-	-	-
Total	36	2194:56	10	24	2	126	1075	0	.895	3.44

== Rankings ==
Poll	Week																										
Poll	Pre	1	2	3	4	5	6	7	8	9	10	11	12	13	14	15	16	17	18	19	20	21	22	23	24	25	26 (Final)
USCHO.com	NR	NR	NR	NR	NR	NR	NR	NR	NR	NR	NR	–	NR	NR	NR	NR	NR	NR	NR	NR	NR	NR	NR	NR	NR	–	NR
USA Hockey	NR	NR	NR	NR	NR	NR	NR	NR	NR	NR	NR	NR	–	NR	NR	NR	NR	NR	NR	NR	NR	NR	NR	NR	NR	NR	NR

Note: USCHO did not release a poll in weeks 11 and 25.
Note: USA Hockey did not release a poll in week 12.

== Awards and honors ==
Player	Award	Ref
Luigi Benincasa	CCHA Rookie Team	
