= 2024–25 Ferris State Bulldogs men's ice hockey season =

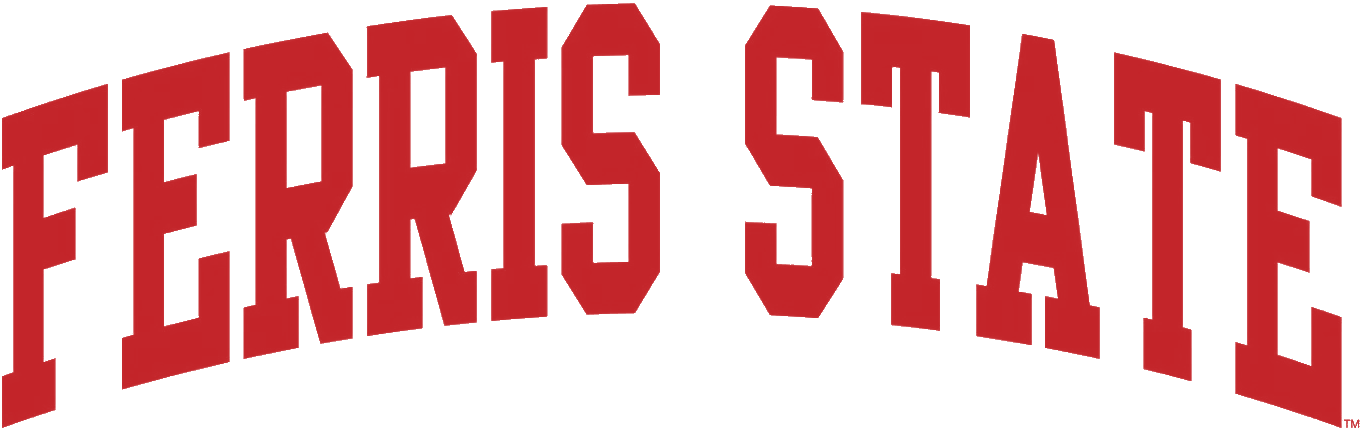
- Conference: T–6th CCHA
- Home ice: Ewigleben Arena

Rankings
- USCHO: NR
- USA Hockey: NR

Record
- Overall: 13–20–3
- Conference: 12–13–1
- Home: 6–8–3
- Road: 6–10–0
- Neutral: 1–2–0

Coaches and captains
- Head coach: Bob Daniels
- Assistant coaches: Drew Famulak; Mark Kaufman; Dave Cencer
- Captain: Travis Shoudy

The 2024–25 Ferris State Bulldogs men's ice hockey season was the 50th season of play for the program and the 39th in the Central Collegiate Hockey Association (CCHA). The Bulldogs represented Ferris State University in the 2024–25 NCAA Division I men's ice hockey season, played their home games at Ewigleben Arena and were coached by Bob Daniels in his 33rd season.

== Season ==
Ferris State had a very poor start to their season. After only being able to earn ties with Miami (who would go on to have one of the worst seasons in all of college hockey), the team lost nine of their next eleven games. Neither the offense nor the defense played well in that stretch and by mid-November the Bulldogs were wallowing near the bottom of the standings. Graduate transfer Noah West began to show some improvement around Thanksgiving and the team was able to crawl its way out of the conference cellar before the winter break.

The team returned to the ice at the Holiday Face–Off and were handed two embarrassing losses. After a week off they were swept by St. Thomas but did show some improvement in the series. However, in the middle of the following week, head coach Bob Daniels announced that he would be retiring at the end of the season, bringing his 36-year tenure at the school to a close. The team responded by showing much more determination in the remainder of its schedule. The Bulldogs went 7–4–1 down the stretch while playing better on both sides of the puck. The team wasn't able to completely overcome their terrible start but they did move up into a tie for sixth in the standings.

FSU began its postseason run on the road against the Tommies and the team was blitzed by a potent offensive display. St. Thomas ran through the Bulldog defense and fired 37 shots on goal in both games. They managed to produce 11 goals in the two matches which Ferris just could not overcome. Despite the poor finish, Daniels was able to end his career with a record of 510–625–117 and a lasting legacy at the university.

== Departures ==
Player	Position	Nationality	Cause
Luigi Benincasa	Forward	Canada	Transferred to Minnesota State
Jason Brancheau	Forward	United States	Graduation (signed with Knoxville Ice Bears)
Drew Cooper	Defenseman	United States	Graduation (retired)
Noah Giesbrecht	Goaltender	Canada	Graduate transfer to Rensselaer
Nick Hale	Defenseman	United States	Graduation (retired)
Joey Henson	Goaltender	United States	Left program (retired)
Brenden MacLaren	Forward	United States	Graduation (retired)
Austin McCarthy	Forward	United States	Graduate transfer to Adrian
Jack Mesic	Defenseman	United States	Transferred to Western Michigan
Štěpán Pokorný	Forward	Czech Republic	Graduation (signed with Mountfield HK)
Ben Schultheis	Defenseman	United States	Graduate transfer to Utica
Logan Stein	Goaltender	United States	Graduate transfer to Michigan
Antonio Venuto	Forward	United States	Graduate transfer to Merrimack

== Recruiting ==
Player	Position	Nationality	Age	Notes
Gavin Best	Forward	United States	23	Richfield, MN; transfer from Michigan State
Conner Brown	Defenseman	United States	20	Maplewood, MN
Cole Burtch	Forward	Canada	23	Markham, ON; transfer from Western Michigan; redshirt
Matt Corbet	Forward	Canada	20	Mannheim, GER
Logan Heroux	Defenseman	United States	21	Middletown, NJ
Max Itagaki	Defenseman	United States	22	Glenview, IL; transfer from Army
Xavier Jean-Louis	Defenseman	Canada	23	Miami, FL; transfer from Alaska
Christopher Lie	Defenseman	Norway	19	Hamar, NOR
Luke Lisko	Forward	United States	20	Marine City, MI
Martin Lundberg	Goaltender	Norway	19	Furuberget, NOR
Connor McDonough	Goaltender	United States	20	Mendham Borough, New Jersey
Jack Silich	Forward	United States	21	Long Grove, IL
Kade Turner	Defenseman	Canada	21	Calgary, AB
Mason West	Goaltender	United States	19	Traverse City, MI; joined mid-season
Noah West	Goaltender	United States	23	Pittsboro, IN; graduate transfer from Michigan

== Roster ==
As of January 1, 2025.

No.	Nat.	Player	Class	Pos	Height	Weight	DoB	Hometown	Previous team	NHL rights
1	(United States)	Mason West	Freshman	G	6' 1" (1.85 m)	170 lb (77 kg)	2004-10-18	Traverse City, Michigan	Peoria Mustangs (NA3HL)	—
2	(United States)	Travis Shoudy (C)	Junior	D	5' 9" (1.75 m)	173 lb (78 kg)	2002-03-15	Marysville, Michigan	Cedar Rapids RoughRiders (USHL)	—
3	(United States)	Logan Heroux	Freshman	D	6' 1" (1.85 m)	190 lb (86 kg)	2003-05-30	Middletown, New Jersey	Shreveport Mudbugs (NAHL)	—
4	(Norway)	Christopher Lie	Freshman	D	5' 10" (1.78 m)	163 lb (74 kg)	2005-07-27	Hamar, Norway	Malmö Redhawks J20 (J20 Nationell)	—
5	(United States)	Nico DeVita	Senior	D	6' 2" (1.88 m)	202 lb (92 kg)	2001-05-24	Bellevue, Washington	New Hampshire (HEA)	—
6	(Canada)	Xavier Jean-Louis	Junior	D	6' 5" (1.96 m)	205 lb (93 kg)	2001-06-25	Montreal, Quebec	Alaska (NCAA)	—
7	(Canada)	Connor McGrath	Junior	F	5' 9" (1.75 m)	184 lb (83 kg)	2003-09-04	Leroy, Saskatchewan	Humboldt Broncos (SJHL)	—
8	(Canada)	Tyler Schleppe	Junior	F	6' 4" (1.93 m)	220 lb (100 kg)	2001-11-11	Vancouver, British Columbia	Langley Rivermen (BCHL)	—
9	(United States)	Nick Nardecchia	Senior	F	5' 9" (1.75 m)	177 lb (80 kg)	2001-01-01	Macomb, Michigan	Lincoln Stars (USHL)	—
10	(United States)	Kade Turner	Freshman	F	6' 0" (1.83 m)	185 lb (84 kg)	2003-02-04	Calgary, Alberta	Okotoks Oilers (BCHL)	—
11	(United States)	Jacob Dirks	Graduate	F	6' 1" (1.85 m)	190 lb (86 kg)	1999-09-15	Mindoro, Wisconsin	Chippewa Steel (NAHL)	—
12	(Canada)	Holden Doell	Sophomore	F	5' 11" (1.8 m)	185 lb (84 kg)	2003-12-01	Martensville, Saskatchewan	Battlefords North Stars (SJHL)	—
15	(United States)	Jack Silich	Freshman	F	5' 10" (1.78 m)	179 lb (81 kg)	2003-06-20	Long Grove, Illinois	Cranbrook Bucks (BCHL)	—
16	(Canada)	Caiden Gault	Junior	F	6' 1" (1.85 m)	190 lb (86 kg)	2002-04-16	Oakbank, Manitoba	Spruce Grove Saints (AJHL)	—
17	(United States)	Luke Lisko	Freshman	F	6' 1" (1.85 m)	181 lb (82 kg)	2004-05-24	Marine City, Michigan	Sherwood Park Crusaders (BCHL)	—
18	(Canada)	Kaleb Ergang	Senior	F	5' 10" (1.78 m)	165 lb (75 kg)	2000-12-31	Spruce Grove, Alberta	Whitecourt Wolverines (AJHL)	—
19	(United States)	Max Itagaki	Junior	F	5' 5" (1.65 m)	155 lb (70 kg)	2002-06-18	Glenview, Illinois	Army (AHA)	—
20	(United States)	Andrew Noel	Junior	D	6' 1" (1.85 m)	200 lb (91 kg)	2001-01-02	Maynard, Massachusetts	Nanaimo Clippers (BCHL)	—
21	(Canada)	Matt Corbet	Freshman	F	6' 4" (1.93 m)	179 lb (81 kg)	2003-12-23	Mannheim, Germany	Grande Prairie Storm (AJHL)	—
22	(United States)	Emerson Goode	Sophomore	F	5' 9" (1.75 m)	180 lb (82 kg)	2002-10-16	Anaheim, California	Odessa Jackalopes (NAHL)	—
24	(United States)	Conner Brown	Freshman	D	6' 0" (1.83 m)	190 lb (86 kg)	2003-12-23	Maplewood, Minnesota	Janesville Jets (NAHL)	—
25	(United States)	Zach Faremouth	Senior	F	6' 3" (1.91 m)	210 lb (95 kg)	2000-01-04	Jackson, Michigan	Des Moines Buccaneers (USHL)	—
26	(United States)	Jacob Badal	Junior	F	6' 0" (1.83 m)	205 lb (93 kg)	2001-10-05	Flushing, Michigan	Johnstown Tomahawks (NAHL)	—
27	(United States)	Gavin Best	Junior	F	6' 2" (1.88 m)	190 lb (86 kg)	2001-08-24	Richfield, Minnesota	Michigan State (Big Ten)	—
28	(United States)	Trevor Taulien	Sophomore	D	6' 4" (1.93 m)	225 lb (102 kg)	2003-04-14	Crystal Lake, Illinois	Odessa Jackalopes (NAHL)	—
29	(Canada)	Cole Burtch	Sophomore (RS)	F	5' 10" (1.78 m)	168 lb (76 kg)	2001-01-11	Markham, Ontario	Western Michigan (NCHC)	—
30	(United States)	Connor McDonough	Freshman	G	6' 5" (1.96 m)	209 lb (95 kg)	2004-08-04	Mendham Borough, New Jersey	Amarillo Wranglers (NAHL)	—
31	(United States)	Noah West	Graduate	G	6' 2" (1.88 m)	185 lb (84 kg)	2000-11-25	Pittsboro, Indiana	Michigan (Big Ten)	—
34	(United States)	Nick Grimaldi	Senior	F	5' 7" (1.7 m)	140 lb (64 kg)	1999-06-26	Plymouth, Michigan	Odessa Jackalopes (NAHL)	—
55	(Norway)	Martin Lundberg	Freshman	G	6' 1" (1.85 m)	172 lb (78 kg)	2005-02-04	Furuberget, Norway	Mora IK J20 (J20 Nationell)	—

== Standings ==
2024–25 Central Collegiate Hockey Association standings
	Conference record											Overall record					
	GP	W	L	T	OTW	OTL	SW	PTS	PCT ^	GF	GA	GP	W	L	T	GF	GA
#14 Minnesota State †*	26	18	5	3	3	1	1	56	.718	77	37	39	27	9	3	113	58
Augustana	16	9	5	2	1	1	1	30	.625	48	37	35	18	13	4	97	75
St. Thomas	26	13	9	4	1	1	1	42	.564	76	66	38	19	14	5	111	101
Bowling Green	26	12	10	4	2	3	2	43	.551	69	63	36	18	14	4	90	85
Michigan Tech	26	12	11	3	1	1	1	40	.513	75	69	36	16	17	3	95	96
Ferris State	26	12	13	1	1	0	0	36	.462	74	81	36	13	20	3	89	128
Bemidji State	26	10	12	4	3	1	4	36	.462	63	78	38	15	18	5	93	114
Lake Superior State	26	10	15	1	0	4	0	35	.449	71	76	36	12	22	2	93	115
Northern Michigan	26	4	20	2	1	1	2	16	.205	42	88	34	5	27	2	55	115
Championship: March 21, 2025 † indicates conference regular-season champion (MacNaughton Cup) * indicates conference tournament champion (Mason Cup)^ Because Augustana played a transition schedule of 16 games against conference opponents, winning percentage was used to determine conference position. Rankings: USCHO.com Top 20 Poll

== Schedule and results ==
Date	Time	Opponent^{#}	Rank^{#}	Site	TV	Decision	Result	Attendance	Record
Regular season
October 4	8:07 pm	Miami*		Ewigleben Arena • Big Rapids, Michigan	Midco Sports+	West	T 3–3 ^{OT}	1,500	0–0–1
October 5	8:07 pm	Miami*		Ewigleben Arena • Big Rapids, Michigan	Midco Sports+	West	T 4–4 ^{OT}	1,505	0–0–2
October 11	7:00 pm	at #17 Western Michigan*		Lawson Arena • Kalamazoo, Michigan		West	L 1–4	3,637	0–1–2
October 12	7:07 pm	#17 Western Michigan*		Ewigleben Arena • Big Rapids, Michigan	Midco Sports+	West	L 1–5	1,112	0–2–2
October 18	7:00 pm	at St. Lawrence*		Appleton Arena • Canton, New York	ESPN+	West	W 1–0	—	1–2–2
October 19	7:00 pm	at St. Lawrence*		Appleton Arena • Canton, New York	ESPN+	Lundberg	L 0–8	905	1–3–2
October 25	7:07 pm	Bemidji State		Ewigleben Arena • Big Rapids, Michigan	Midco Sports+	West	W 4–2	1,059	2–3–2 (1–0–0)
October 26	6:07 pm	Bemidji State		Ewigleben Arena • Big Rapids, Michigan	Midco Sports+	West	L 0–3	1,011	2–4–2 (1–1–0)
November 1	7:07 pm	at Bowling Green		Slater Family Ice Arena • Bowling Green, Ohio	Midco Sports+	West	L 0–2	1,852	2–5–2 (1–2–0)
November 2	7:07 pm	at Bowling Green		Slater Family Ice Arena • Bowling Green, Ohio	Midco Sports+	West	L 4–5	2,268	2–6–2 (1–3–0)
November 8	7:07 pm	Michigan Tech		Ewigleben Arena • Big Rapids, Michigan	Midco Sports+	West	L 2–3	1,159	2–7–2 (1–4–0)
November 9	6:07 pm	Michigan Tech		Ewigleben Arena • Big Rapids, Michigan	Midco Sports+	McDonough	L 1–3	1,321	2–8–2 (1–5–0)
November 15	7:07 pm	at Lake Superior State		Taffy Abel Arena • Sault Ste. Marie, Michigan	Midco Sports+	West	L 2–4	—	2–9–2 (1–6–0)
November 16	6:07 pm	vs. Lake Superior State		Huntington Rink • Traverse City, Michigan (Superior Ice Showdown)	Midco Sports+	West	W 3–2	1,800	3–9–2 (2–6–0)
November 22	7:07 pm	Augustana		Ewigleben Arena • Big Rapids, Michigan	Midco Sports+	West	W 5–2	1,121	4–9–2 (3–6–0)
November 23	6:07 pm	Augustana		Ewigleben Arena • Big Rapids, Michigan	Midco Sports+	West	L 1–4	1,031	4–10–2 (3–7–0)
December 6	7:07 pm	at Northern Michigan		Berry Events Center • Marquette, Michigan	Midco Sports+	West	W 3–1	2,214	5–10–2 (4–7–0)
December 7	6:07 pm	at Northern Michigan		Berry Events Center • Marquette, Michigan	Midco Sports+	West	W 2–1	2,236	6–10–2 (5–7–0)
Holiday Face–Off
December 28	6:00 pm	vs. Wisconsin*		Fiserv Forum • Milwaukee, Wisconsin (Holiday Face–Off Semifinal)		West	L 0–8	6,625	6–11–2
December 29	2:30 pm	vs. Alaska*		Fiserv Forum • Milwaukee, Wisconsin (Holiday Face–Off Consolation Game)		West	L 1–4	4,920	6–12–2
January 4	6:07 pm	USNTDP*		Ewigleben Arena • Big Rapids, Michigan (Exhibition)	Midco Sports+	McDonough	L 3–4	1,543	
January 10	8:07 pm	at St. Thomas		St. Thomas Ice Arena • Mendota Heights, Minnesota	Midco Sports+	Lundberg	L 6–9	841	6–13–2 (5–8–0)
January 11	7:07 pm	at St. Thomas		St. Thomas Ice Arena • Mendota Heights, Minnesota	Midco Sports+	West	L 3–4	—	6–14–2 (5–9–0)
January 17	7:07 pm	Bowling Green		Ewigleben Arena • Big Rapids, Michigan	Midco Sports+	West	L 3–4	1,100	6–15–2 (5–10–0)
January 18	6:07 pm	Bowling Green		Ewigleben Arena • Big Rapids, Michigan	Midco Sports+	West	W 4–3	1,210	7–15–2 (6–10–0)
January 24	7:07 pm	#14 Minnesota State		Ewigleben Arena • Big Rapids, Michigan	Midco Sports+	West	W 2–0	1,875	8–15–2 (7–10–0)
January 25	7:07 pm	#14 Minnesota State		Ewigleben Arena • Big Rapids, Michigan	Midco Sports+	West	L 2–7	1,956	8–16–2 (7–11–0)
January 31	8:07 pm	at Bemidji State		Sanford Center • Bemidji, Minnesota	Midco Sports+	West	W 5–1	1,829	9–16–2 (8–11–0)
February 1	7:07 pm	at Bemidji State		Sanford Center • Bemidji, Minnesota	Midco Sports+	West	W 3–1	1,692	10–16–2 (9–11–0)
February 14	7:07 pm	Lake Superior State		Ewigleben Arena • Big Rapids, Michigan	Midco Sports+	West	W 3–2 ^{OT}	1,818	11–16–2 (10–11–0)
February 15	6:07 pm	Lake Superior State		Ewigleben Arena • Big Rapids, Michigan	Midco Sports+	West	L 3–5	2,031	11–17–2 (10–12–0)
February 21	7:07 pm	at Michigan Tech		MacInnes Student Ice Arena • Houghton, Michigan	Midco Sports+	West	L 1–6	3,085	11–18–2 (10–13–0)
February 22	6:07 pm	at Michigan Tech		MacInnes Student Ice Arena • Houghton, Michigan	Midco Sports+	West	W 3–2	3,255	12–18–2 (11–13–0)
February 28	7:07 pm	Northern Michigan		Ewigleben Arena • Big Rapids, Michigan	Midco Sports+	West	W 5–1	2,133	13–18–2 (12–13–0)
March 1	6:07 pm	Northern Michigan		Ewigleben Arena • Big Rapids, Michigan	Midco Sports+	West	T 4–4 ^{SOL}	2,200	13–18–3 (12–13–1)
CCHA Tournament
March 7	8:00 pm	at St. Thomas*		St. Thomas Ice Arena • Mendota Heights, Minnesota (CCHA Quarterfinal Game 1)	Midco Sports+	West	L 3–7	447	13–19–3
March 8	7:00 pm	at St. Thomas*		St. Thomas Ice Arena • Mendota Heights, Minnesota (CCHA Quarterfinal Game 2)	Midco Sports+	West	L 1–4	462	13–20–3
*Non-conference game. ^{#}Rankings from USCHO.com Poll. All times are in Eastern Time. Source:

== Scoring statistics ==
Name	Position	Games	Goals	Assists	Points	PIM
Cole Burtch	LW	35	7	19	26	34
Caiden Gault	F	36	15	10	25	10
Kaleb Ergang	RW	35	6	15	21	6
Gavin Best	F	36	10	9	19	4
Tyler Schleppe	F	29	9	9	18	8
Travis Shoudy	D	36	6	12	18	8
Zach Faremouth	F	33	8	5	13	17
Logan Heroux	D	32	3	9	12	28
Trevor Taulien	D	36	3	9	12	33
Jacob Badal	LW	25	4	6	10	6
Holden Doell	F	31	2	8	10	12
Max Itagaki	F	26	2	7	9	14
Connor McGrath	C	26	0	8	8	8
Nick Nardecchia	RW	33	2	5	7	14
Jack Silich	F	20	3	3	6	6
Xavier Alexandre Jean-Louis	D	30	2	4	6	14
Matt Corbet	F	20	2	3	5	12
Christopher Lie	D	20	1	3	4	6
Nico DeVita	D	36	1	3	4	21
Andrew Noel	D	30	1	2	3	22
Kade Turner	D	25	1	1	2	4
Conner Brown	D	16	0	2	2	4
Jacob Dirks	F	23	1	0	1	2
Noah West	G	35	0	1	1	0
Connor McDonough	G	1	0	0	0	0
Luke Lisko	C	3	0	0	0	2
Martin Lundberg	G	3	0	0	0	0
Emerson Goode	C/W	12	0	0	0	6
Total			89	155	244	315

== Goaltending statistics ==
Name	Games	Minutes	Wins	Losses	Ties	Goals Against	Saves	Shut Outs	SV %	GAA
Noah West	35	2026:24	13	17	3	110	1001	1	.901	3.26
Martin Lundberg	3	127:42	0	2	0	11	56	0	.836	5.17
Connor McDonough	1	6:52	0	1	0	3	1	0	.250	26.21
Empty Net	-	20:58	-	-	-	4	-	-	-	-
Total	36	2180:00	13	20	3	128	1058	1	.892	3.52

== Rankings ==
Poll	Week																											
Poll	Pre	1	2	3	4	5	6	7	8	9	10	11	12	13	14	15	16	17	18	19	20	21	22	23	24	25	26	27 (Final)
USCHO.com	NR	NR	NR	NR	NR	NR	NR	NR	NR	NR	NR	NR	–	NR	NR	NR	NR	NR	NR	NR	NR	NR	NR	NR	NR	NR	–	NR
USA Hockey	NR	NR	NR	NR	NR	NR	NR	NR	NR	NR	NR	NR	–	NR	NR	NR	NR	NR	NR	NR	NR	NR	NR	NR	NR	NR	NR	NR

Note: USCHO did not release a poll in week 12 or 26.
Note: USA Hockey did not release a poll in week 12.

== Awards and honors ==
Player	Award	Ref
Travis Shoudy	All-CCHA Second Team	
