= 2020–21 Ferris State Bulldogs men's ice hockey season =

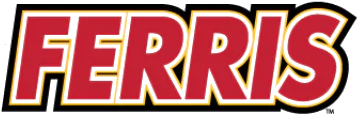
- Conference: 8th WCHA
- Home ice: Ewigleben Arena

Rankings
- USCHO.com: NR
- USA Today/ US Hockey Magazine: NR

Record
- Overall: 1–23–1
- Conference: 0–13–1–0–1–1
- Home: 1–10–1
- Road: 0–13–0
- Neutral: 0–0–0

Coaches and captains
- Head coach: Bob Daniels
- Assistant coaches: Drew Famulak; Mark Kaufman; Kyle Schempp
- Captain: Liam MacDougall

The 2020–21 Ferris State Bulldogs men's ice hockey season was the 46th season of play for the program and the 8th in the WCHA conference. The Bulldogs represented Ferris State University and were coached by Bob Daniels, in his 29th season.

== Season ==
As a result of the ongoing COVID-19 pandemic the entire college ice hockey season was delayed. Because the NCAA had previously announced that all winter sports athletes would retain whatever eligibility they possessed through at least the following year, none of Ferris State's players would lose a season of play. However, the NCAA also approved a change in its transfer regulations that would allow players to transfer and play immediately rather than having to sit out a season, as the rules previously required.

From the very beginning Ferris State had a bad season. Losses piled up week after week and, as the year progressed, the team produced a record that was so dreadful it needs historical context to properly appreciate. The 2019–20 Ferris State team was the first season in the 45-year history of the program to finish with less than 10 wins. This season had seven times fewer wins (1 vs. 7). The team's only win on the year came against a Division III team, but not just any D-III program, Trine's program was just four years old and had yet to accomplish anything significant. Ferris State allowed over 4 goals per game on the year and scored nearly half as many themselves (if the Trine game is excluded they scored exactly 2 goals per game). The only saving grace for the Bulldogs is a tie they earned against Bemidji State, a ranked team no less. In the end, however, Ferris State went winless against their peers, an ignominious achievement accomplished by just two other teams in history: 1961 Brown and 1962 Colorado College.

== Departures ==
Player	Position	Nationality	Cause
Oskar Andrén	Forward	Sweden	Graduation (Signed with Väsby IK HK)
Cam Clarke	Defenseman	United States	Graduation (Signed with Wichita Thunder)
Nate Kallen	Defenseman	United States	Graduation (Signed with Maine Mariners)
Dominic Lutz	Forward	United States	Graduation
Joe Rutkowski	Defenseman	United States	Graduation (Signed with Rapid City Rush)
Austin Shaw	Goaltender	United States	Graduation (Signed with Norfolk Admirals)
Jason Tackett	Forward	United States	Graduation (Signed with Macon Mayhem)
Zach Yoder	Defenseman	United States	Graduation (Signed with Toledo Walleye)

== Recruiting ==
Player	Position	Nationality	Age	Notes
Drew Cooper	Defenseman	United States	20	Ann Arbor, MI
Mitchel Deelstra	Forward	Canada	21	Wallace, ON
Jacob Dirks	Forward	United States	21	Mindoro, WI
Luke Farthing	Defenseman	United States	20	Stoutsville, OH
Austin McCarthy	Forward	United States	21	Ludington, MI
Štěpán Pokorný	Forward	Czech Republic	20	Kolín, CZE
Ben Schultheis	Defenseman	United States	20	Mount Juliet, TN
Sam Skinner	Defenseman	United States	19	Schoolcraft, MI
Logan Stein	Goaltender	United States	19	Suwanee, GA
Antonio Venuto	Forward	United States	20	Whitmore Lake, MI

== Roster ==
As of September 11, 2020.

No.	Nat.	Player	Class	Pos	Height	Weight	DoB	Hometown	Previous team	NHL rights
1	(United States)	Logan Stein	Freshman	G	6' 2" (1.88 m)	205 lb (93 kg)	2001-04-26	Suwanee, Georgia	Waterloo Black Hawks (USHL)	—
2	(United States)	Max Finner	Sophomore	D	5' 11" (1.8 m)	160 lb (73 kg)	1998-10-09	Elmhurst, Illinois	Topeka Pilots (NAHL)	—
3	(United States)	Ben Schultheis	Freshman	D	6' 3" (1.91 m)	205 lb (93 kg)	2000-02-17	Mount Juliet, Tennessee	Dubuque Fighting Saints (USHL)	—
4	(United States)	Drew Cooper	Freshman	D	6' 1" (1.85 m)	185 lb (84 kg)	2000-08-28	Ann Arbor, Michigan	Coquitlam Express (BCHL)	—
5	(United States)	Justin Smith	Junior	D	6' 1" (1.85 m)	195 lb (88 kg)	1999-06-26	East Lansing, Michigan	Topeka Pilots (NAHL)	—
6	(United States)	Blake Evennou	Sophomore	D	5' 9" (1.75 m)	185 lb (84 kg)	1998-07-09	Macomb, Michigan	Lone Star Brahmas (WCHA)	—
7	(United States)	Connor Fedorek	Sophomore	D	6' 0" (1.83 m)	175 lb (79 kg)	1999-03-27	Bethel Park, Pennsylvania	Odessa Jackalopes (CCHL)	—
8	(United States)	Austin McCarthy	Freshman	F	6' 1" (1.85 m)	194 lb (88 kg)	1999-03-01	Ludington, Michigan	Topeka Pilots (NAHL)	—
9	(United States)	Lucas Finner	Senior	F	5' 10" (1.78 m)	172 lb (78 kg)	1997-02-05	Elmhurst, Illinois	Nanaimo Clippers (BCHL)	—
10	(United States)	Coale Norris	Senior	F	6' 2" (1.88 m)	205 lb (93 kg)	1997-05-25	Oxford, Michigan	Youngstown Phantoms (USHL)	—
11	(United States)	Jacob Dirks	Freshman	F	6' 1" (1.85 m)	190 lb (86 kg)	1999-09-15	Mindoro, Wisconsin	Chippewa Steel (NAHL)	—
12	(United States)	Dallas Tulik	Sophomore	F	6' 0" (1.83 m)	185 lb (84 kg)	1998-06-23	Kalamazoo, Michigan	Dubuque Fighting Saints (USHL)	—
13	(Canada)	Mitch Deelstra	Freshman	F	6' 0" (1.83 m)	185 lb (84 kg)	1999-07-15	Wallace, Ontario	Alberni Valley Bulldogs (BCHL)	—
15	(United States)	Jake Transit	Junior	F	5' 10" (1.78 m)	173 lb (78 kg)	1999-02-26	Royal Oak, Michigan	Dubuque Fighting Saints (USHL)	—
16	(United States)	Justin Michaelian	Junior	F	6' 0" (1.83 m)	190 lb (86 kg)	1997-12-07	Wixom, Michigan	Victoria Grizzlies (BCHL)	—
17	(United States)	Marshall Moise	Senior	F	6' 2" (1.88 m)	207 lb (94 kg)	1997-10-11	St. Clair Shores, Michigan	Youngstown Phantoms (USHL)	—
18	(United States)	Hunter Wendt	Junior	F	5' 7" (1.7 m)	173 lb (78 kg)	1997-10-27	Troy, Michigan	Fairbanks Ice Dogs (NAHL)	—
19	(Czech Republic)	Štěpán Pokorný	Freshman	F	6' 0" (1.83 m)	185 lb (84 kg)	2000-06-08	Kolín, Czech Republic	Madison Capitols (USHL)	—
20	(Canada)	Liam MacDougall (C)	Senior	F	5' 11" (1.8 m)	187 lb (85 kg)	1997-12-18	Windsor, Ontario	LaSalle Vipers (GOJHL)	—
21	(United States)	Jason Brancheau	Sophomore	F	5' 8" (1.73 m)	158 lb (72 kg)	1999-08-15	Ecorse, Michigan	Amarillo Bulls (NAHL)	—
22	(United States)	Luke Farthing	Freshman	D	5' 10" (1.78 m)	181 lb (82 kg)	1999-04-21	Stoutsville, Ohio	Chippewa Steel (NAHL)	—
23	(United States)	Antonio Venuto	Freshman	F	6' 3" (1.91 m)	201 lb (91 kg)	2000-02-26	Whitmore Lake, Michigan	Dubuque Fighting Saints (USHL)	—
24	(United States)	Brenden MacLaren	Sophomore	F	5' 11" (1.8 m)	195 lb (88 kg)	1998-11-30	Sault Ste. Marie, Michigan	Fairbanks Ice Dogs (NAHL)	—
25	(United States)	Jake Willets	Sophomore	D	6' 1" (1.85 m)	195 lb (88 kg)	1999-08-06	Erie, Michigan	Amarillo Bulls (NAHL)	—
26	(United States)	Sam Skinner	Freshman	D	5' 10" (1.78 m)	172 lb (78 kg)	2001-03-31	Schoolcraft, Michigan	Minot Minotauros (NAHL)	—
27	(Canada)	Cade Kowalski	Sophomore	F	5' 11" (1.8 m)	180 lb (82 kg)	1999-06-15	Morden, Manitoba	Flin Flon Bombers (SJHL)	—
28	(United States)	Brenden Rons	Sophomore	D	6' 6" (1.98 m)	215 lb (98 kg)	1998-03-03	Farmington Hills, Michigan	Topeka Pilots (NAHL)	—
29	(United States)	Ethan Stewart	Junior	F	6' 1" (1.85 m)	200 lb (91 kg)	1997-02-10	Rockford, Illinois	Springfield Jr. Blues (NAHL)	—
30	(Finland)	Roni Salmenkangas	Junior	G	6' 0" (1.83 m)	170 lb (77 kg)	1999-03-28	Tampere, Finland	HPK U20 (Nuorten SM-liiga)	—
33	(United States)	Carter McPhail	Sophomore	G	5' 10" (1.78 m)	175 lb (79 kg)	1998-12-04	Fenton, Michigan	Johnstown Tomahawks (NAHL)	—

== Standings ==
2020–21 Western Collegiate Hockey Association Standings
	Conference record										Overall record					
	GP	W	L	T	OTW	OTL	3/SW	PTS	GF	GA	GP	W	L	T	GF	GA
#4 Minnesota State †	14	13	1	0	1	1	0	39	56	15	27	22	5	1	100	46
#14 Lake Superior State *	14	9	5	0	2	2	0	27	39	34	29	19	7	3	86	63
#18 Bowling Green	14	8	5	1	0	2	0	27	46	34	31	20	10	1	108	67
#10 Bemidji State	14	8	5	1	3	2	0	24	42	34	29	16	10	3	82	70
Michigan Tech	14	7	7	0	1	0	0	20	38	35	30	17	12	1	78	63
Northern Michigan	14	6	7	1	2	2	1	20	40	47	29	11	17	1	79	103
Alabama–Huntsville	14	3	11	0	1	0	0	8	18	49	22	3	18	1	31	80
Ferris State	14	0	13	1	0	1	1	3	28	59	25	1	23	1	55	103
Alaska	0	-	-	-	-	-	-	-	-	-	0	-	-	-	-	-
Alaska Anchorage	0	-	-	-	-	-	-	-	-	-	0	-	-	-	-	-
Championship: March 20, 2021 † indicates conference regular season champion * indicates conference tournament champion Rankings: USCHO.com Top 20 Poll

== Schedule and results ==
Date	Time	Opponent^{#}	Rank^{#}	Site	TV	Decision	Result	Attendance	Record
Regular season
December 11	7:07 PM	at #16 Bowling Green*		Slater Family Ice Arena • Bowling Green, Ohio		McPhail	L 2–3	300	0–1–0
December 12	7:07 PM	vs. #16 Bowling Green*		Ewigleben Arena • Big Rapids, Michigan		McPhail	L 2–6	0	0–2–0
December 16	6:00 PM	at Northern Michigan*		Berry Events Center • Marquette, Michigan		Salmenkangas	L 4–5	0	0–3–0
December 30	3:07 PM	vs. Northern Michigan*		Ewigleben Arena • Big Rapids, Michigan		Salmenkangas	L 5–6 ^{OT}	0	0–4–0
January 2	3:07 PM	vs. #7 Bowling Green		Ewigleben Arena • Big Rapids, Michigan	FloHockey.tv	Salmenkangas	L 1–6	250	0–5–0 (0–1–0)
January 3	3:07 PM	vs. #7 Bowling Green		Ewigleben Arena • Big Rapids, Michigan	FloHockey.tv	Salmenkangas	L 2–4	250	0–6–0 (0–2–0)
January 8	8:00 PM	at Alabama–Huntsville		Von Braun Center • Huntsville, Alabama	FloHockey.tv	Stein	L 4–5 ^{OT}	1,124	0–7–0 (0–3–0)
January 9	8:00 PM	at Alabama–Huntsville		Von Braun Center • Huntsville, Alabama	FloHockey.tv	Stein	L 0–2	1,228	0–8–0 (0–4–0)
January 16	7:07 PM	vs. Trine*		Ewigleben Arena • Big Rapids, Michigan		Salmenkangas	W 7–0	250	1–8–0
January 23	6:07 PM	at #2 Minnesota State		Mayo Clinic Health System Event Center • Mankato, Minnesota	FloHockey.tv	Stein	L 0–4	0	1–9–0 (0–5–0)
January 24	4:07 PM	at #2 Minnesota State		Mayo Clinic Health System Event Center • Mankato, Minnesota	FloHockey.tv	Salmenkangas	L 1–4	0	1–10–0 (0–6–0)
January 29	7:07 PM	at Northern Michigan		Berry Events Center • Marquette, Michigan	FloHockey.tv	Salmenkangas	L 4–5	0	1–11–0 (0–7–0)
January 30	6:07 PM	at Northern Michigan		Berry Events Center • Marquette, Michigan	FloHockey.tv	Stein	L 3–5	0	1–12–0 (0–8–0)
February 2	6:07 PM	vs. Michigan Tech		Ewigleben Arena • Big Rapids, Michigan	FloHockey.tv	Stein	L 4–6	250	1–13–0 (0–9–0)
February 5	7:07 PM	vs. #18 Bemidji State		Ewigleben Arena • Big Rapids, Michigan	FloHockey.tv	Stein	T 3–3 ^{SOW}	200	1–13–1 (0–9–1)
February 6	7:14 PM	vs. #18 Bemidji State		Ewigleben Arena • Big Rapids, Michigan	FloHockey.tv	Stein	L 2–7	234	1–14–1 (0–10–1)
February 9	4:07 PM	vs. Michigan Tech		Ewigleben Arena • Big Rapids, Michigan	FloHockey.tv	Stein	L 1–2	175	1–15–1 (0–11–1)
February 12	7:07 PM	at Michigan Tech*		MacInnes Student Ice Arena • Houghton, Michigan		Salmenkangas	L 0–3	300	1–16–1
February 13	6:07 PM	at Michigan Tech*		MacInnes Student Ice Arena • Houghton, Michigan		Stein	L 1–5	300	1–17–1
February 19	7:07 PM	vs. #3 Minnesota State*		Ewigleben Arena • Big Rapids, Michigan		Salmenkangas	L 4–5 ^{OT}	215	1–18–1
February 20	7:07 PM	vs. #3 Minnesota State*		Ewigleben Arena • Big Rapids, Michigan		Stein	L 1–5	250	1–19–1
February 26	7:07 PM	vs. #18 Lake Superior State		Ewigleben Arena • Big Rapids, Michigan	FloHockey.tv	Salmenkangas	L 2–4	250	1–20–1 (0–12–1)
March 6	3:07 PM	vs. #20 Lake Superior State		Taffy Abel Arena • Sault Ste. Marie, Michigan	FloHockey.tv	Stein	L 1–2	0	1–21–1 (0–13–1)
WCHA Tournament
March 12	7:07 PM	at #3 Minnesota State*		Mayo Clinic Health System Event Center • Mankato, Minnesota (WCHA Quarterfinals game 1)		Stein	L 0–3	250	1–22–1
March 13	5:07 PM	at #3 Minnesota State*		Mayo Clinic Health System Event Center • Mankato, Minnesota (WCHA Quarterfinals game 2)		Salmenkangas	L 1–3	250	1–23–1
Ferris State Lost Series 0–2
*Non-conference game. ^{#}Rankings from USCHO.com Poll. All times are in Eastern Time.

== Scoring statistics ==
Name	Position	Games	Goals	Assists	Points	PIM
Coale Norris	LW	25	8	9	17	4
Jake Transit	F	24	6	8	14	44
Ethan Stewart	F	25	6	8	14	2
Mitch Deelstra	LW	25	7	4	11	18
Justin Michaelian	F	14	6	5	11	17
Lucas Finner	LW	21	2	9	11	24
Blake Evennou	D	25	1	9	10	10
Antonio Venuto	RW	22	3	6	9	6
Štěpán Pokorný	F	24	2	7	9	8
Marshall Moise	F	21	4	3	7	16
Jake Willets	D	17	2	4	6	14
Liam MacDougall	F	24	1	4	5	18
Ben Schultheis	D	25	0	5	5	12
Jason Brancheau	F	16	1	3	4	4
Dallas Tuliks	F	13	1	2	3	4
Drew Cooper	D	20	1	2	3	0
Connor Fedorek	D	24	0	3	3	8
Max Finner	D	16	1	1	2	8
Jacob Dirks	F	18	1	1	2	4
Luke Farthing	D	20	1	1	2	6
Sam Skinner	D	6	0	2	2	2
Cade Kowalski	C/RW	10	0	2	2	21
Brenden MacLaren	F	12	1	0	1	10
Hunter Wendt	F	2	0	0	0	2
Carter McPhail	G	2	0	0	0	0
Justin Smith	D	5	0	0	0	0
Austin McCarthy	F	5	0	0	0	0
Logan Stein	G	12	0	0	0	0
Roni Salmenkangas	G	14	0	0	0	0
Brenden Rons	D	16	0	0	0	20
Bench	-	25	0	0	0	10
Total			55	98	153	292

== Goaltending statistics ==
Name	Games	Minutes	Wins	Losses	Ties	Goals against	Saves	Shut outs	SV %	GAA
Logan Stein	12	695	0	11	1	44	389	0	.887	3.80
Roni Salmenkangas	14	759	1	10	0	49	398	1	.877	3.87
Carter McPhail	2	52	0	2	0	5	31	0	.839	5.75
Empty Net	-	9	-	-	-	5	-	-	-	-
Total	25	1516	1	23	1	103	720	1	.875	4.08

== Rankings ==
Poll	Week																					
Poll	Pre	1	2	3	4	5	6	7	8	9	10	11	12	13	14	15	16	17	18	19	20	21 (Final)
USCHO.com	NR	NR	NR	NR	NR	NR	NR	NR	NR	NR	NR	NR	NR	NR	NR	NR	NR	NR	NR	NR	-	NR
USA Today	NR	NR	NR	NR	NR	NR	NR	NR	NR	NR	NR	NR	NR	NR	NR	NR	NR	NR	NR	NR	NR	NR

USCHO did not release a poll in week 20.
