= 2020–21 Northern Michigan Wildcats men's ice hockey season =

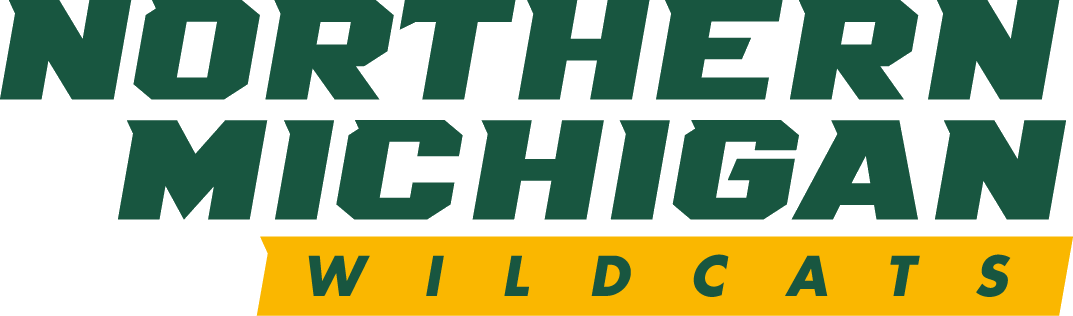
- Conference: T–5th WCHA
- Home ice: Berry Events Center

Rankings
- USCHO: NR
- USA Today: NR

Record
- Overall: 11–17–1
- Conference: 6–7–1–2–2–1
- Home: 4–9–1
- Road: 7–7–0
- Neutral: 0–1–0

Coaches and captains
- Head coach: Grant Potulny
- Assistant coaches: Byron Pool; Rob Lehtinen
- Captain: Joseph Nardi
- Alternate captain: Ben Newhouse

The 2020–21 Northern Michigan Wildcats men's ice hockey season was the 45th season of play for the program and the 21st in the WCHA conference. The Wildcats represented Northern Michigan University and were coached by Grant Potulny, in his 4th season.

== Season ==
As a result of the ongoing COVID-19 pandemic the entire college ice hockey season was delayed. Because the NCAA had previously announced that all winter sports athletes would retain whatever eligibility they possessed through at least the following year, none of Northern Michigan's players would lose a season of play. However, the NCAA also approved a change in its transfer regulations that would allow players to transfer and play immediately rather than having to sit out a season, as the rules previously required.

Northern Michigan began the season poorly. In their first 14 games the team's only wins were against Ferris State, the worst team in the nation. Their 4–10 record included an 8-game losing streak and made it all but impossible for the Wildcats to make the NCAA Tournament without winning their conference championship. The team went through a great deal of changes, including Grant Loven transferring to St. Thomas mid-season and bringing in Rico DiMatteo after the new year. It was more than a month before DiMatteo made his first appearance for NMU but, once he did, the Wildcats' season completely turned around. DiMatteo helped Northern Michigan get the first win of the year that wasn't against FSU and then sweep a ranked Bemidji State team the very next weekend.

The team sagged at the end of the regular season, finishing 6th in the conference, and entered the WCHA Tournament with little hope of advancing. NMU gave #13 Bowling Green a surprise in the first game, winning 4–3, but when the Falcons roared back for a 5–0 victory in game two the series looked ready to be over. DiMatteo was shelled in the third game, facing a total of 40 shots in regulation, but he only allowed one by him while the Wildcat offense pumped 5 goals into the net and the team earned a surprising trip to the semifinals. The Wildcats were set against #3 Minnesota State and again pulled off a miraculous upset. The Wildcats fired 4 goals past the top goaltender in the nation and scored 5 in all before the Mavericks could even respond. The next day NMU was looking for the first championship in 29 years and only had Lake Superior State standing in their way. In the first ever postseason meeting between the two upper peninsula teams, Northern Michigan's magic ran out and they surrendered two goals in each period, losing the title game 3–6.

James Miller and John Roberts sat out the season.

== Departures ==
Player	Position	Nationality	Cause
Josh Arnold	Forward	Canada	Left program
Philip Beaulieu	Defenseman	United States	Graduation (Signed with Iowa Wild)
Darien Craighead	Forward	Canada	Graduation (Signed with South Carolina Stingrays)
Jarrett Lee	Forward	United States	Transferred to Minnesota Duluth
Adam Roeder	Defenseman	United States	Left program
Caleb Schroer	Forward	United States	Left program
Mitch Slattery	Forward	United States	Left program
Luke Voltin	Forward	United States	Graduation
Rylan Yaremko	Defenseman/Forward	Canada	Transferred to Mount Royal

== Recruiting ==
Player	Position	Nationality	Age	Notes
Tyrell Boucher	Defenseman	Canada	21	Grande Prairie, AB
Mack Byers	Forward	United States	21	Long Lake, MN
Mikey Colella	Forward	United States	21	Turnersville, NJ
Rico DiMatteo	Goaltender	United States	19	Brasher Falls, NY
Colby Enns	Defenseman	United States	21	Minot, ND; transfer from Omaha
Tim Erkkila	Defenseman	United States	19	Brighton, MI
Alex Frye	Defenseman	United States	21	Clarkston, MI; transfer from Alaska Anchorage
Noah Ganske	Defenseman	United States	21	Bloomington, MN
Grant Johnson	Goaltender	United States	21	Grand Forks, ND
David Keefer	Forward	United States	22	Howell, MI; transfer from Michigan State
Ian Malcolmson	Forward	United States	21	Waukesha, WI
Connor Marritt	Forward	Canada	21	Kelowna, BC
James Miller	Defenseman	Canada	21	Spruce Grove, AB
Rylan Van Unen	Forward	Canada	21	Kamloops, BC
Brett Willits	Forward	United States	21	London, ON

== Roster ==
As of March 1, 2021.

No.	Nat.	Player	Class	Pos	Height	Weight	DoB	Hometown	Previous team	NHL rights
1	(Canada)	Nolan Kent	Junior	G	6' 0" (1.83 m)	196 lb (89 kg)	1998-08-12	Chestermere, Alberta	Spruce Grove Saints (AJHL)	—
2	(United States)	Alex Frye	Sophomore	F	5' 11" (1.8 m)	175 lb (79 kg)	1998-07-27	Clarkston, Michigan	Alaska Anchorage (WCHA)	—
2	(Canada)	James Miller	Freshman	D	6' 2" (1.88 m)	188 lb (85 kg)	1998-02-20	Spruce Grove, Alberta	Stony Plain Eagles (ACHW)	—
3	(United States)	Colby Enns	Sophomore	D	6' 2" (1.88 m)	201 lb (91 kg)	1999-09-16	Minot, North Dakota	Lincoln Stars (USHL)	—
4	(Canada)	Michael Van Unen	Sophomore	D	6' 1" (1.85 m)	190 lb (86 kg)	1999-02-26	Kamloops, British Columbia	Merritt Centennials (BCHL)	—
5	(United States)	Mason Palmer	Sophomore	D	6' 2" (1.88 m)	190 lb (86 kg)	1998-11-20	Plymouth, Minnesota	Waterloo Black Hawks (USHL)	—
6	(Canada)	Tyrell Boucher	Freshman	D	6' 1" (1.85 m)	185 lb (84 kg)	1999-06-03	Grande Prairie, Alberta	Cowichan Valley Capitals (BCHL)	—
7	(United States)	David Keefer	Junior (RS)	F	5' 10" (1.78 m)	195 lb (88 kg)	1997-10-21	Brighton, Michigan	Michigan State (Big Ten)	—
8	(United States)	Tim Erkkila	Freshman	D	6' 1" (1.85 m)	185 lb (84 kg)	2000-11-16	Brighton, Michigan	Fairbanks Ice Dogs (NAHL)	—
9	(United States)	Ian Malcolmson	Freshman	F	5' 10" (1.78 m)	165 lb (75 kg)	1999-01-29	Waukesha, Wisconsin	Sioux Falls Stampede (USHL)	—
10	(United States)	Ben Newhouse (A)	Senior	D	5' 8" (1.73 m)	174 lb (79 kg)	1997-06-16	Edina, Minnesota	Union (ECAC)	—
11	(United States)	Andre Ghantous	Sophomore	F	5' 9" (1.75 m)	170 lb (77 kg)	1998-12-07	Glendale, California	Penticton Vees (BCHL)	—
12	(Canada)	Connor Marritt	Freshman	F	6' 1" (1.85 m)	174 lb (79 kg)	1999-03-14	Kelowna, British Columbia	Vernon Vipers (BCHL)	—
13	(United States)	Mikey Colella	Freshman	F	5' 7" (1.7 m)	155 lb (70 kg)	1999-06-12	Wenonah, New Jersey	Trail Smoke Eaters (BCHL)	—
14	(United States)	Vincent de Mey	Junior	F	6' 1" (1.85 m)	185 lb (84 kg)	1997-11-26	Los Angeles, California	Muskegon Lumberjacks (USHL)	—
15	(Canada)	Rylan Van Unen	Freshman	F	6' 1" (1.85 m)	190 lb (86 kg)	1999-02-26	Kamloops, British Columbia	Merritt Centennials (BCHL)	—
16	(United States)	Griffin Loughran	Junior	F	5' 7" (1.7 m)	145 lb (66 kg)	1998-11-13	West Seneca, New York	Fargo Force (USHL)	—
17	(United States)	Grant Johnson	Freshman	F	5' 11" (1.8 m)	180 lb (82 kg)	1999-04-11	Grand Forks, North Dakota	Bismarck Bobcats (NAHL)	—
18	(Canada)	Joseph Nardi (C)	Senior	F	5' 10" (1.78 m)	178 lb (81 kg)	1997-06-01	Edmonton, Alberta	Whitecourt Wolverines (AJHL)	—
19	(United States)	A. J. Vanderbeck	Sophomore (RS)	F	5' 11" (1.8 m)	185 lb (84 kg)	1997-09-23	Monument, Colorado	Ohio State (Big Ten)	—
20	(United States)	Garrett Klee	Junior	F	6' 1" (1.85 m)	190 lb (86 kg)	1998-04-11	Morrison, Colorado	Waterloo Black Hawks (USHL)	—
21	(United States)	Brandon Schultz	Senior	F	5' 7" (1.7 m)	150 lb (68 kg)	1996-06-15	Estero, Florida	Northeastern (HEA)	—
22	(United States)	Jett Jungels	Freshman (RS)	F	5' 8" (1.73 m)	165 lb (75 kg)	2000-07-14	Edina, Minnesota	Edina High School (USHS–MN)	—
23	(United States)	Hank Sorensen	Sophomore	D	6' 1" (1.85 m)	195 lb (88 kg)	1998-06-05	Wayzata, Minnesota	Waterloo Black Hawks (USHL)	—
24	(United States)	Noah Ganske	Freshman	D	6' 7" (2.01 m)	207 lb (94 kg)	1999-04-21	Bloomington, Minnesota	Green Bay Gamblers (USHL)	—
25	(Canada)	Brett Willits	Freshman	F	5' 10" (1.78 m)	174 lb (79 kg)	1999-03-16	London, Ontario	Chilliwack Chiefs (BCHL)	—
26	(Canada)	Ty Readman	Junior	F	5' 6" (1.68 m)	160 lb (73 kg)	1998-01-05	Edmonton, Alberta	Sherwood Park Crusaders (AJHL)	—
27	(United States)	Mack Byers	Freshman	F	5' 11" (1.8 m)	172 lb (78 kg)	1999-02-08	Long Lake, Minnesota	Aberdeen Wings (NAHL)	—
28	(United States)	Tanner Vescio	Sophomore	D	6' 2" (1.88 m)	195 lb (88 kg)	1998-04-14	Blaine, Minnesota	Fargo Force (USHL)	—
29	(United States)	Grant Loven ^{†}	Junior	F	5' 11" (1.8 m)	192 lb (87 kg)	1997-12-21	East Grand Forks, Minnesota	Minot Minotauros (NAHL)	—
30	(Canada)	John Hawthorne	Sophomore	G	6' 2" (1.88 m)	190 lb (86 kg)	1998-09-02	Chemainus, British Columbia	Alberni Valley Bulldogs (BCHL)	—
31	(United States)	John Roberts	Sophomore	G	5' 9" (1.75 m)	175 lb (79 kg)	1998-12-02	Lansdale, Pennsylvania	Bismarck Bobcats (NAHL)	—
32	(Canada)	Connor Ryckman	Junior (RS)	G	6' 0" (1.83 m)	170 lb (77 kg)	1996-09-18	Minesing, Ontario	Wisconsin–Stevens Point (WIAC)	—
33	(United States)	Rico DiMatteo	Freshman	G	6' 3" (1.91 m)	161 lb (73 kg)	2001-01-01	Brasher Falls, New York	Lone Star Brahmas (NAHL)	—

† Grant Loven played 6 games before transferring to St. Thomas.

== Standings ==
2020–21 Western Collegiate Hockey Association Standings
	Conference record										Overall record					
	GP	W	L	T	OTW	OTL	3/SW	PTS	GF	GA	GP	W	L	T	GF	GA
#4 Minnesota State †	14	13	1	0	1	1	0	39	56	15	27	22	5	1	100	46
#14 Lake Superior State *	14	9	5	0	2	2	0	27	39	34	29	19	7	3	86	63
#18 Bowling Green	14	8	5	1	0	2	0	27	46	34	31	20	10	1	108	67
#10 Bemidji State	14	8	5	1	3	2	0	24	42	34	29	16	10	3	82	70
Michigan Tech	14	7	7	0	1	0	0	20	38	35	30	17	12	1	78	63
Northern Michigan	14	6	7	1	2	2	1	20	40	47	29	11	17	1	79	103
Alabama–Huntsville	14	3	11	0	1	0	0	8	18	49	22	3	18	1	31	80
Ferris State	14	0	13	1	0	1	1	3	28	59	25	1	23	1	55	103
Alaska	0	-	-	-	-	-	-	-	-	-	0	-	-	-	-	-
Alaska Anchorage	0	-	-	-	-	-	-	-	-	-	0	-	-	-	-	-
Championship: March 20, 2021 † indicates conference regular season champion * indicates conference tournament champion Rankings: USCHO.com Top 20 Poll

== Schedule and results ==
Date	Time	Opponent^{#}	Rank^{#}	Site	TV	Decision	Result	Attendance	Record
Regular season
December 16	6:00 PM	vs. Ferris State*		Berry Events Center • Marquette, Michigan		Ryckman	W 5–4	0	1–0–0
December 18	7:07 PM	at Michigan Tech*		MacInnes Student Ice Arena • Houghton, Michigan		Kent	L 3–4 ^{OT}	0	1–1–0
December 18	6:07 PM	at Michigan Tech*		MacInnes Student Ice Arena • Houghton, Michigan		Ryckman	L 1–3	0	1–2–0
December 30	3:07 PM	at Ferris State*		Ewigleben Arena • Big Rapids, Michigan		Ryckman	W 6–5 ^{OT}	68	2–2–0
January 2	6:07 PM	vs. #5 Minnesota State		Berry Events Center • Marquette, Michigan		Ryckman	L 0–5	0	2–3–0 (0–1–0)
January 3	4:07 PM	vs. #5 Minnesota State		Berry Events Center • Marquette, Michigan		Kent	L 0–4	0	2–4–0 (0–2–0)
January 8	7:07 PM	vs. Lake Superior State*		Berry Events Center • Marquette, Michigan		Kent	L 1–4	0	2–5–0
January 9	6:07 PM	vs. Lake Superior State*		Berry Events Center • Marquette, Michigan		Kent	L 2–3 ^{OT}	0	2–6–0
January 15	7:07 PM	at #8 Bowling Green*		Slater Family Ice Arena • Bowling Green, Ohio		Ryckman	L 1–5	300	2–7–0
January 16	7:07 PM	at #8 Bowling Green*		Slater Family Ice Arena • Bowling Green, Ohio		Hawthorne	L 2–6	300	2–8–0
January 23	4:07 PM	at Michigan Tech*		MacInnes Student Ice Arena • Houghton, Michigan		Kent	L 0–2	200	2–9–0
January 25	5:07 PM	vs. #18 Michigan Tech*		Berry Events Center • Marquette, Michigan		Kent	L 1–4	0	2–10–0
January 29	7:07 PM	vs. Ferris State		Berry Events Center • Marquette, Michigan		Kent	W 5–4	0	3–10–0 (1–2–0)
January 30	6:07 PM	vs. Ferris State		Berry Events Center • Marquette, Michigan		Kent	W 5–3	0	4–10–0 (2–2–0)
February 6	5:00 PM	vs. Lake Superior State		Taffy Abel Arena • Sault Ste. Marie, Michigan		Kent	L 4–5 ^{OT}	0	4–11–0 (2–3–0)
February 7	3:00 PM	vs. Lake Superior State		Taffy Abel Arena • Sault Ste. Marie, Michigan		DiMatteo	W 4–3	0	5–11–0 (3–3–0)
February 12	8:07 PM	at #17 Bemidji State		Sanford Center • Bemidji, Minnesota		DiMatteo	W 5–1	90	6–11–0 (4–3–0)
February 13	7:00 PM	at #17 Bemidji State		Sanford Center • Bemidji, Minnesota		DiMatteo	W 3–2 ^{OT}	90	7–11–0 (5–3–0)
February 16	4:37 PM	vs. Alabama–Huntsville		Berry Events Center • Marquette, Michigan		DiMatteo	L 1–3	0	7–12–0 (5–4–0)
February 17	7:07 PM	vs. Alabama–Huntsville		Berry Events Center • Marquette, Michigan		DiMatteo	W 8–2	0	8–12–0 (6–4–0)
February 20	6:07 PM	vs. #14 Bowling Green		Berry Events Center • Marquette, Michigan		DiMatteo	T 0–0 ^{SOW}	250	8–12–1 (6–4–1)
February 21	4:07 PM	vs. #14 Bowling Green		Berry Events Center • Marquette, Michigan		DiMatteo	L 2–6	250	8–13–1 (6–5–1)
February 26	7:07 PM	at #20 Michigan Tech		MacInnes Student Ice Arena • Houghton, Michigan		DiMatteo	L 1–6	300	8–14–1 (6–6–1)
February 27	6:07 PM	vs. #20 Michigan Tech*		Berry Events Center • Marquette, Michigan		DiMatteo	L 2–3 ^{OT}	250	8–15–1 (6–7–1)
WCHA Tournament
March 12	7:07 PM	at #13 Bowling Green*		Slater Family Ice Arena • Bowling Green, Ohio (WCHA Quarterfinals Game 1)		DiMatteo	W 4–3	630	9–15–1
March 13	7:07 PM	at #13 Bowling Green*		Slater Family Ice Arena • Bowling Green, Ohio (WCHA Quarterfinals Game 1)		DiMatteo	L 0–5	630	9–16–1
March 14	5:07 PM	at #13 Bowling Green*		Slater Family Ice Arena • Bowling Green, Ohio (WCHA Quarterfinals Game 1)		DiMatteo	W 5–1	630	10–16–1
Northern Michigan Won Series 2–1
March 19	3:07 PM	at #3 Minnesota State*		Mayo Clinic Health System Event Center • Mankato, Minnesota (WCHA Semifinals)		DiMatteo	W 5–1	250	11–16–1
March 20	8:07 PM	vs. #17 Lake Superior State*		Mayo Clinic Health System Event Center • Mankato, Minnesota (WCHA Championship)		DiMatteo	L 3–6	250	11–17–1
*Non-conference game. ^{#}Rankings from USCHO.com Poll. All times are in Eastern Time.

== Scoring statistics ==
Name	Position	Games	Goals	Assists	Points	PIM
Joseph Nardi	LW	29	12	21	33	0
André Ghantous	RW	25	10	18	28	16
A. J. Vanderbeck	F	29	14	13	27	22
Griffin Loughran	F	16	5	10	15	38
Michael Van Unen	D	29	3	11	14	47
Vincent de Mey	F	26	7	5	12	16
Brandon Schultz	C/LW	25	5	7	12	14
Alex Frye	C	25	5	6	11	14
David Keefer	RW	28	2	9	11	8
Mikey Colella	F	24	4	3	7	13
Ben Newhouse	D	29	2	5	7	6
Tim Erkkila	D	27	1	5	6	8
Colby Enns	D	26	3	2	5	23
Connor Marritt	F	29	0	4	4	8
Garrett Klee	F	26	3	0	3	10
Hank Sorensen	D	15	0	3	3	53
Ty Readman	C	23	1	1	2	4
Tanner Vescio	D	5	0	2	2	2
Mack Byers	LW	10	0	2	2	2
Noah Ganske	D	15	0	2	2	14
Jett Jungels	F	12	1	0	1	2
Rylan Van Unen	F	19	1	0	1	8
Mason Palmer	D	23	0	1	1	8
Grant Johnson	F	1	0	0	0	0
John Hawthorne	G	4	0	0	0	0
Brett Willits	C	4	0	0	0	0
Connor Ryckman	G	5	0	0	0	0
Grant Loven	C	6	0	0	0	29
Nolan Kent	G	10	0	0	0	0
Tyrell Boucher	D	10	0	0	0	2
Rico DiMatteo	G	14	0	0	0	0
Ian Malcolmson	F	15	0	0	0	0
Bench	-	-	-	-	-	8
Total			79	130	209	377

== Goaltending statistics ==
Name	Games	Minutes	Wins	Losses	Ties	Goals against	Saves	Shut outs	SV %	GAA
Rico DiMatteo	14	823	7	6	1	39	391	1	.909	2.84
Nolan Kent	10	589	2	7	0	32	248	0	.886	3.26
John Hawthorne	4	130	0	1	0	10	68	0	.872	4.59
Connor Ryckman	5	207	2	3	0	18	99	0	.846	5.21
Empty Net	-	16	-	-	-	4	-	-	-	-
Total	29	1767	11	17	1	103	806	1	.887	3.50

== Rankings ==
Poll	Week																					
Poll	Pre	1	2	3	4	5	6	7	8	9	10	11	12	13	14	15	16	17	18	19	20	21 (Final)
USCHO.com	NR	NR	NR	NR	NR	NR	NR	NR	NR	NR	NR	NR	NR	NR	NR	NR	NR	NR	NR	NR	-	NR
USA Today	NR	NR	NR	NR	NR	NR	NR	NR	NR	NR	NR	NR	NR	NR	NR	NR	NR	NR	NR	NR	NR	NR

USCHO did not release a poll in week 20.

== Awards and honors ==
Player	Award	Ref
André Ghantous	WCHA Scoring Champion	
Joseph Nardi	WCHA Second Team	
André Ghantous	WCHA Third Team	
Rico DiMatteo	WCHA Rookie Team	
