= Bob Daniels (ice hockey) =

American ice hockey coach

Biographical details
- Born: March 13, 1959 (age 67); Livonia, Michigan, U.S.

Playing career
- 1979–1980: Michigan State
- Position: Forward

Coaching career (HC unless noted)
- 1983–1986: Hennessey Engineers
- 1986–1987: Miami (graduate assistant)
- 1987–1989: Illinois-Chicago (assistant)
- 1989–1992: Ferris State (assistant)
- 1992–2025: Ferris State

Head coaching record
- Overall: 510–625–117 (.454)
- Tournaments: 6–4 (.600)

Accomplishments and honors

Championships
- 2× CCHA regular season champion (2003, 2012); WCHA regular season champion (2014); WCHA tournament champion (2016)

Awards
- 2003 CCHA Coach of the Year; 2003 Spencer Penrose Award; 2012 CCHA Coach of the Year; 2012 Spencer Penrose Award; 2014 WCHA Coach of the Year

Bob Daniels is an American retired ice hockey coach, who previously the program at Ferris State for 33 years.

== Career ==
Daniels began his coaching career shortly after graduating from Michigan State with a BA in accounting, becoming the head coach for the Hennessey Engineers of the Great Lakes Junior Hockey League. After three seasons in Plymouth, Michigan, Daniels returned to college, this time attending Miami University and earning a Master's in sports organization while serving as a graduate assistant for the RedHawks in 1986–87. The next season saw Daniels as a full-time college assistant for Illinois-Chicago and in his second season the Flames saw their best performance, finishing 3rd in the CCHA and advancing out of the first round in the conference tournament for the first time. After the two-year stint Daniels moved back to Michigan, becoming an assistant at Ferris State under John Perpich.

After a disappointing season in 1989–90 Bob Mancini replaced Perpich but Daniels was retained as an assistant. The first season under the new coach saw the Bulldogs post their first 20-win season in a decade but then slipped back under .500 in 1991–92. Mancini left to take over at Michigan Tech, leaving the door open for Daniels to take the reins.

In his first season leading the team Daniels got the Bulldogs to another 20-win campaign, but it would be six more years before he could provide the Ferris State faithful win another winning season. Daniels' continued on in his position despite the lack of consistent success and rewarded the Bulldogs with their first 30-win season in 2002–03. Ferris State won its first regular season conference title that year and fell one game short of its first conference tournament championship, falling to Michigan 5–3 in the final. With their superb record, Ferris State received an at-large bid to the 2003 NCAA Tournament, their first appearance in the championship, and downed perennial power North Dakota in the regional semifinal before being eliminated. Daniels coached his first Hobey Baker Award finalist in 2003 and while Chris Kunitz failed to capture the award, Daniels himself received both the CCHA Coach of the Year and Spencer Penrose Award.

Over the course of the next decade the Bulldogs hovered around the .500 mark until 2011–12 when Daniels got Ferris State its second regular season title, and NCAA Tournament appearance. The 2012 Tournament saw a better result for the team as they won each of their first three games while allowing only 1 goal in each game. They could not stop the #1 overall seed Boston College Eagles from taking the crown, losing 4–1 in the championship game. The season did finish with a silver lining as Daniels received his second CCHA Coach of the Year and Spencer Penrose Awards.

The following season was Ferris State's last in the CCHA when the conference dissolved after the realignment resulting from the formation of the Big Ten. They joined the WCHA beginning in 2013–14 and got off to a fast start, winning the regular season title with a 29-win year and making their third NCAA berth, losing a double overtime game to North Dakota in the regional finals. For his efforts Daniels was awarded the WCHA Coach of the Year Award.

Daniels won his 500th career game as head coach on November 16, 2024. The win came against Lake Superior State in a special match in Traverse City, Michigan. He became the 17th coach in Division I college hockey to hit the mark. Two months later, Daniels announced his retirement at the end of the 2024–2025 season.

== Head coaching record ==
Record table
Season	Team	Overall	Conference	Standing	Postseason
Ferris State Bulldogs (CCHA) (1992–2013)
1992–93	Ferris State	21–16–4	13–13–4	6th	CCHA Semifinals
1993–94	Ferris State	14–23–1	12–17–1	7th	CCHA first round
1994–95	Ferris State	12–20–4	9–14–4	T–6th	CCHA first round
1995–96	Ferris State	13–22–3	10–17–3	6th	CCHA Quarterfinals
1996–97	Ferris State	11–23–3	7–18–2	9th	
1997–98	Ferris State	15–21–3	12–15–3	8th	CCHA Quarterfinals
1998–99	Ferris State	14–16–6	13–12–5	6th	CCHA Quarterfinals
1999–00	Ferris State	21–16–2	13–13–2	6th	CCHA first round
2000–01	Ferris State	13–20–5	9–15–4	8th	CCHA first round
2001–02	Ferris State	15–20–1	12–15–1	9th	CCHA first round
2002–03	Ferris State	31–10–1	22–5–1	1st	NCAA West Regional Final
2003–04	Ferris State	15–20–3	10–17–1	10th	CCHA first round
2004–05	Ferris State	13–22–4	7–17–4	T–10th	CCHA first round
2005–06	Ferris State	17–15–8	10–11–7	T–6th	CCHA Quarterfinals
2006–07	Ferris State	14–22–3	10–16–2	9th	CCHA first round
2007–08	Ferris State	18–16–5	12–12–4	5th	CCHA Quarterfinals
2008–09	Ferris State	12–19–7	9–14–5–2	9th	CCHA first round
2009–10	Ferris State	21–13–6	13–9–6–4	3rd	CCHA third-place game (loss)
2010–11	Ferris State	18–16–5	12–12–4–4	5th	CCHA Quarterfinals
2011–12	Ferris State	26–12–5	16–7–5–1	1st	NCAA runner-up
2012–13	Ferris State	16–16–5	13–12–3–1	5th	CCHA Quarterfinals
Ferris State Bulldogs (WCHA) (2013–2021)
2013–14	Ferris State	29–11–3	20–6–2	1st	NCAA Midwest Regional Final
2014–15	Ferris State	18–20–2	13–14–1	5th	WCHA Semifinal
2015–16	Ferris State	20–15–6	13–11–4	4th	NCAA West Regional Final
2016–17	Ferris State	13–19–5	12–12–4	5th	WCHA Quarterfinals
2017–18	Ferris State	14–23–1	11–16–1	6th	WCHA Quarterfinals
2018–19	Ferris State	10–23–3	7–18–3	6th	WCHA Quarterfinals
2019–20	Ferris State	7–26–2	5–21–2	9th	
2020–21	Ferris State	1–23–1	0–13–1	8th	WCHA Quarterfinals
Ferris State Bulldogs (CCHA) (2021–2025)
2021–22	Ferris State	11–24–1	9–16–1	7th	CCHA Quarterfinals
2022–23	Ferris State	14–19–4	9–14–3	6th	CCHA Semifinals
2023–24	Ferris State	10–24–2	6–17–1	8th	CCHA Quarterfinals
2024–25	Ferris State	13–20–3	12–13–1	T–6th	CCHA Quarterfinals
Ferris State:		510–625–117	365–452–84		
Total:		510–625–117			
National champion Postseason invitational champion Conference regular season champion Conference regular season and conference tournament champion Division regular season champion Division regular season and conference tournament champion Conference tournament champion

== See also ==
- List of college men's ice hockey coaches with 400 wins

Awards and achievements
Preceded by Guy Gadowsky; Jeff Jackson	CCHA Coach of the Year; 2002–03; 2011–12	Succeeded by Enrico Blasi; Enrico Blasi
Preceded by Mike Hastings	WCHA Coach of the Year; 2013–14	Succeeded by Mike Hastings
Preceded by Tim Whitehead; Nate Leaman	Spencer Penrose Award; 2002–03; 2011–12	Succeeded by Scott Sandelin; Norm Bazin
