= Stoutsville, Ohio =

- Village
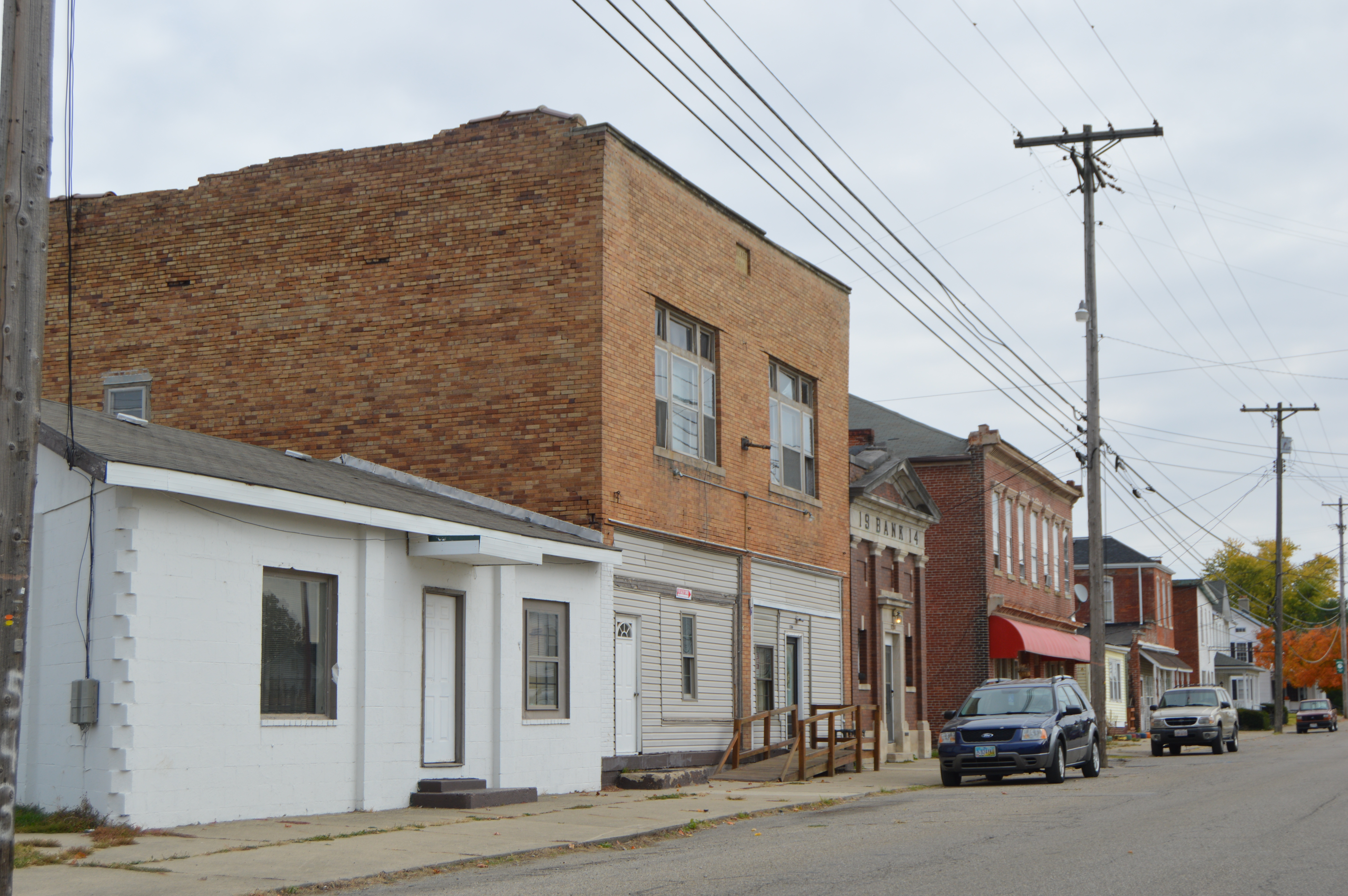
- Main Street

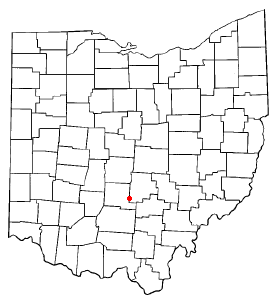
- Location of Stoutsville, Ohio

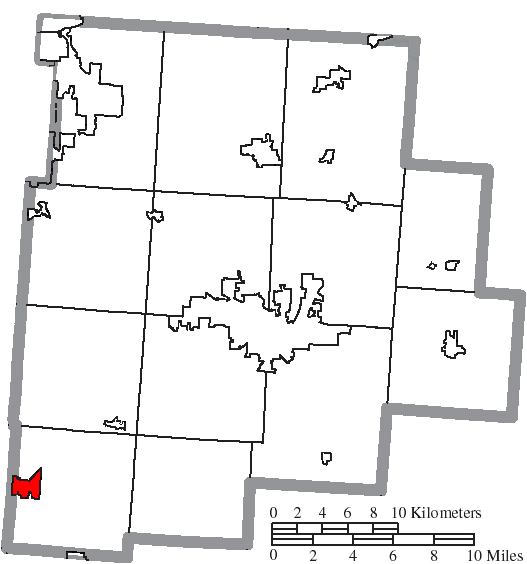
- Location of Stoutsville in Fairfield County
- Coordinates: 39°36′18″N 82°49′24″W
- Country: United States
- State: Ohio
- County: Fairfield

Area
  - Total: 1.15 sq mi (2.99 km^{2})
  - Land: 1.15 sq mi (2.99 km^{2})
  - Water: 0 sq mi (0.00 km^{2})
- Elevation: 978 ft (298 m)

Population (2020)
  - Total: 579
  - Density: 501.0/sq mi (193.42/km^{2})
- Time zone: UTC-5 (Eastern (EST))
  - Summer (DST): UTC-4 (EDT)
- ZIP code: 43154
- Area code: 740
- FIPS code: 39-74916
- GNIS feature ID: 2399911

Stoutsville is a village in Fairfield County, Ohio, United States. The population was 579 at the 2020 census.

== History ==
Benjamin Stout laid out Stoutsville in 1854, and named it for himself. A post office has been in operation at Stoutsville since 1855.

== Geography ==
According to the United States Census Bureau, the village has a total area of 1.16 square miles (3.00 km^{2}), all land.

== Demographics ==
Historical population
Census	Pop.	Note	%±
1870	160		—
1880	340		112.5%
1890	282		−17.1%
1970	573		—
1980	537		−6.3%
1990	518		−3.5%
2000	581		12.2%
2010	560		−3.6%
2020	579		3.4%
U.S. Decennial Census

=== 2010 census ===
As of the census of 2010, there were 560 people, 211 households, and 150 families living in the village. The population density was 482.8 inhabitants per square mile (186.4/km^{2}). There were 234 housing units at an average density of 201.7 per square mile (77.9/km^{2}). The racial makeup of the village was 99.8% White and 0.2% from two or more races. Hispanic or Latino of any race were 0.5% of the population.

There were 211 households, of which 38.4% had children under the age of 18 living with them, 53.1% were married couples living together, 11.8% had a female householder with no husband present, 6.2% had a male householder with no wife present, and 28.9% were non-families. 23.7% of all households were made up of individuals, and 8.5% had someone living alone who was 65 years of age or older. The average household size was 2.65 and the average family size was 3.11.

The median age in the village was 38.4 years. 28.2% of residents were under the age of 18; 5.4% were between the ages of 18 and 24; 28.7% were from 25 to 44; 26.8% were from 45 to 64; and 10.9% were 65 years of age or older. The gender makeup of the village was 50.5% male and 49.5% female.

=== 2000 census ===
As of the census of 2000, there were 581 people, 214 households, and 161 families living in the village. The population density was 435.8 inhabitants per square mile (168.3/km^{2}). There were 220 housing units at an average density of 165.0 per square mile (63.7/km^{2}). The racial makeup of the village was 98.62% White, 0.17% African American, 0.34% Native American, and 0.86% from two or more races. Hispanic or Latino of any race were 0.52% of the population.

There were 214 households, out of which 40.2% had children under the age of 18 living with them, 61.2% were married couples living together, 10.7% had a female householder with no husband present, and 24.3% were non-families. 21.5% of all households were made up of individuals, and 11.2% had someone living alone who was 65 years of age or older. The average household size was 2.71 and the average family size was 3.10.

In the village, the population was spread out, with 28.1% under the age of 18, 6.2% from 18 to 24, 31.7% from 25 to 44, 23.2% from 45 to 64, and 10.8% who were 65 years of age or older. The median age was 34 years. For every 100 females there were 99.0 males. For every 100 females age 18 and over, there were 88.3 males.

The median income for a household in the village was $46,765, and the median income for a family was $50,278. Males had a median income of $34,643 versus $24,318 for females. The per capita income for the village was $25,626. About 3.1% of families and 3.8% of the population were below the poverty line, including 1.5% of those under age 18 and 6.8% of those age 65 or over.

== Education ==
Stoutsville is part of the Amanda-Clearcreek Local School District. Until 2003, Stoutsville was home to both an elementary school and junior high school, after which children attended Amanda-Clearcreek High School. All local children now attend grades K-12 in Amanda.
