= Leroy, Saskatchewan =

Town in Saskatchewan, Canada

Leroy
- Town
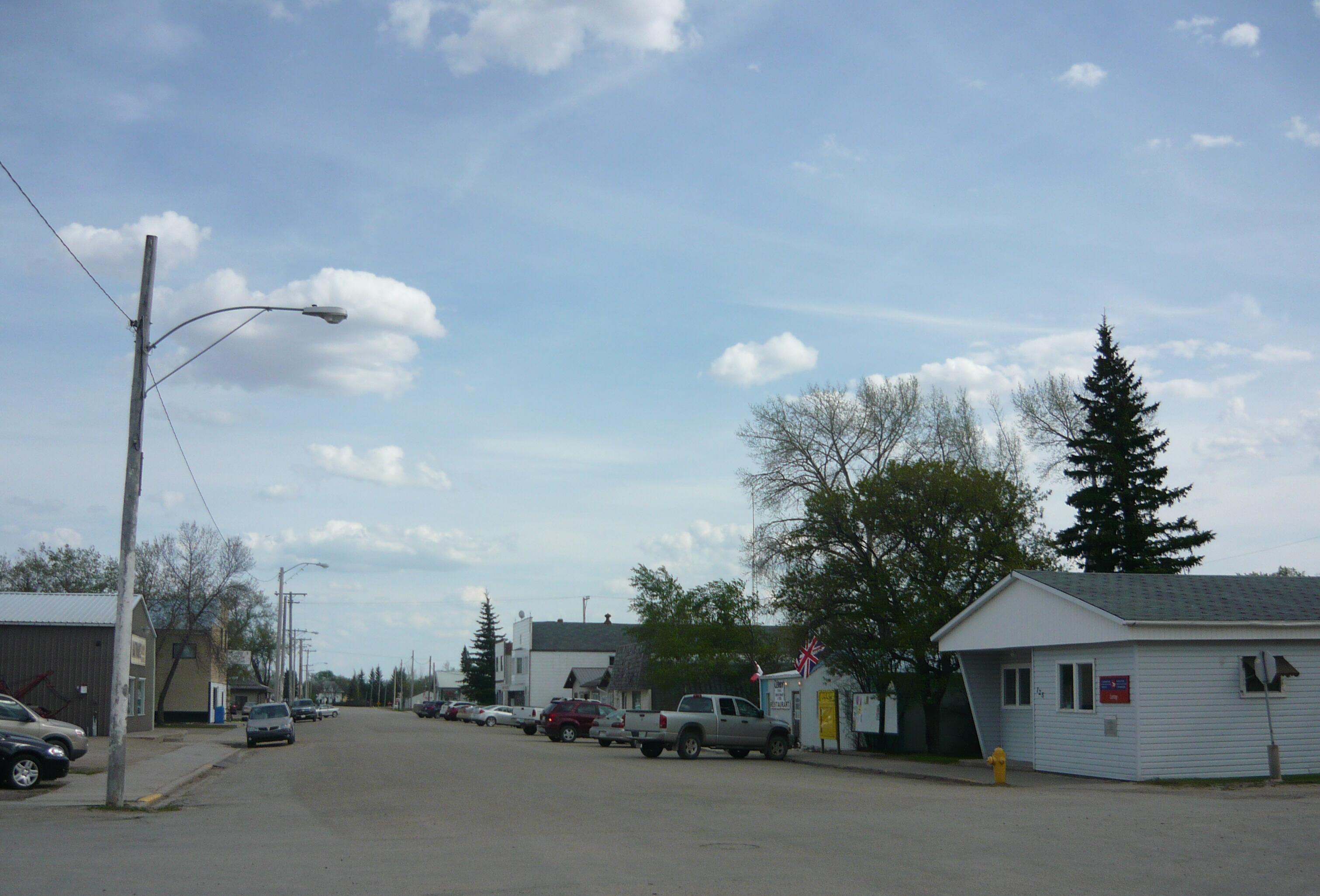
- Aspen Street

- Location of Leroy in Saskatchewan Leroy (Canada)
- Coordinates: 52.002°N 104.735°W
- Country: Canada
- Province: Saskatchewan
- Census division: No. 10
- Rural Municipality: Leroy
- Post office Founded: 1909-02-01
- Incorporated (Village): N/A
- Incorporated (Town): N/A

Government
  - Mayor: Kurt Schreiner
  - Administrator: Glenda Hamilton
  - Governing body: Leroy Town Council

Area
  - Total: 1.06 km^{2} (0.41 sq mi)

Population (2011)
  - Total: 427
  - Density: 402.1/km^{2} (1,041/sq mi)
- Time zone: CST
- Postal code: S0K 2P0
- Area code: 306
- Highways: Highway 13; Highway 18
- Website: www.leroy.ca

Leroy is a town in the Canadian province of Saskatchewan.

From 1905 to 1913 the area now known as LeRoy was a Local Improvement District. In 1913 the Local Improvement District was constituted as the Rural Municipality of Roach #339, as meetings were held at the home of James Roach. In 1914, it became the RM of Ayr #339, containing the Bogend Post Office, established in 1905, and Bogend School in 1907.

In August 1919 a Canadian Pacific Railway (CPR) blueprint showed the crossing of the proposed rail line to be built through the RM, so planning began for a town in that RM in the same year. The area was named Bogend and on January 21, 1920 it was renamed LeRoy. LeRoy was incorporated as a village on December 5, 1922. In March 1963 proclamation received declaring LeRoy a town.

== Sports and recreation ==
The LeRoy Memorial Arena is home to the Leroy Braves of the Long Lake Hockey League. Leroy also has a curling rink, ball diamonds nearby, and golf at the regional park, amongst other activities. Four miles south of town is Jansen Lake and to the east are the Quill Lakes.

== Leroy Leisureland Regional Park ==
Leroy Leisureland Regional Park (51.9981°N 104.8337°W) was founded in 1972 and is located about 6.5 kilometres (4.0 mi) west of Leroy. It is nestled among 70 acres of well treed rolling land with Lanigan Creek running through it, a man-made sand swimming pool with a slide, a playground, beach volleyball, one horse shoe pit, and table tennis. There is a nine-hole grass green golf course and 34 campsites with 30-amp power. The golf clubhouse and concession were built in 1992, and, in 1999, there was a grass green upgrade to the golf course.

== Demographics ==
In the 2021 Census of Population conducted by Statistics Canada, Leroy had a population of 510 living in 196 of its 238 total private dwellings, a change of 13.3% from its 2016 population of 450. With a land area of 2.11 km^{2} (0.81 sq mi), it had a population density of 241.7/km^{2} (626.0/sq mi) in 2021.

Canada census – Leroy community profile

	2021	2011
Population	510 (+13.3% from 2016)	427 (+3.6% from 2006)
Land area	2.11 km^{2} (0.81 sq mi)	1.06 km^{2} (0.41 sq mi)
Population density	241.4/km^{2} (625/sq mi)	402.1/km^{2} (1,041/sq mi)
Median age	38.4 (M: 38.0, F: 38.8)	48.4 (M: 47.0, F: 49.3)
Private dwellings	238 (total) 196 (occupied)	195 (total)
Median household income	$86,000

References: 2021 2011

== Climate ==
Climate data for Leroy
Month	Jan	Feb	Mar	Apr	May	Jun	Jul	Aug	Sep	Oct	Nov	Dec	Year
Record high °C (°F)	6 (43)	7 (45)	19 (66)	31 (88)	34 (93)	38.5 (101.3)	37.5 (99.5)	36 (97)	33 (91)	30 (86)	16 (61)	9.5 (49.1)	38.5 (101.3)
Mean daily maximum °C (°F)	−11.9 (10.6)	−7.9 (17.8)	−1.2 (29.8)	9.8 (49.6)	18 (64)	22.2 (72.0)	24.5 (76.1)	24.4 (75.9)	17.9 (64.2)	9.8 (49.6)	−2.5 (27.5)	−10 (14)	7.8 (46.0)
Daily mean °C (°F)	−17 (1)	−12.9 (8.8)	−6.1 (21.0)	3.8 (38.8)	11 (52)	15.7 (60.3)	17.7 (63.9)	17.2 (63.0)	11.1 (52.0)	3.9 (39.0)	−6.7 (19.9)	−14.8 (5.4)	1.9 (35.4)
Mean daily minimum °C (°F)	−22 (−8)	−17.9 (−0.2)	−10.9 (12.4)	−2.3 (27.9)	4 (39)	9 (48)	10.9 (51.6)	9.9 (49.8)	4.3 (39.7)	−2 (28)	−10.9 (12.4)	−19.5 (−3.1)	−4 (25)
Record low °C (°F)	−43 (−45)	−42 (−44)	−35 (−31)	−22 (−8)	−9.5 (14.9)	−2.5 (27.5)	1 (34)	−2.5 (27.5)	−7.5 (18.5)	−24.5 (−12.1)	−35 (−31)	−42.5 (−44.5)	−43 (−45)
Average precipitation mm (inches)	16.9 (0.67)	11.1 (0.44)	21.2 (0.83)	24 (0.9)	48.5 (1.91)	73.2 (2.88)	76.6 (3.02)	60.4 (2.38)	36.6 (1.44)	27.4 (1.08)	14.1 (0.56)	18.8 (0.74)	428.7 (16.88)
Source: Environment Canada

== See also ==
- List of communities in Saskatchewan
- List of francophone communities in Saskatchewan
- List of towns in Saskatchewan
