= Ewigleben Arena =

Hockey arena in Big Rapids, Michigan

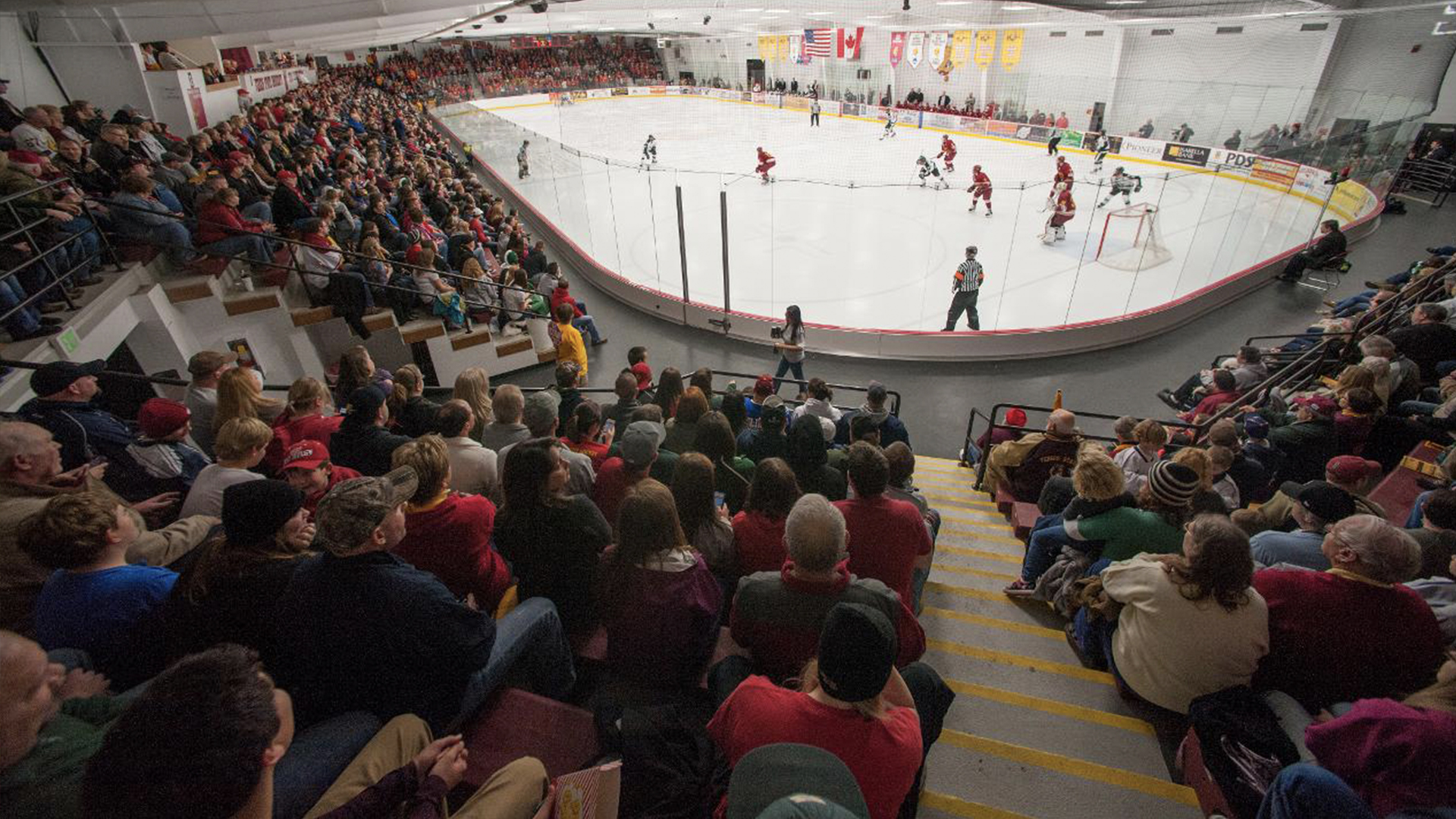
- Interactive map of Ewigleben Arena
- Location: 210 Sports Drive; Big Rapids, Michigan 49307
- Coordinates: 43°40′45″N 85°29′07″W
- Owner: Ferris State University
- Operator: Ferris State University
- Capacity: 2,493 (hockey)
- Surface: 200 ft × 85 ft (61 m × 26 m) (hockey)

Construction
- Opened: 1975
- Architect: o

Tenant
- Ferris State Bulldogs (ice hockey)

The Robert L. Ewigleben Ice Arena (/ˈeɪvəˌɡleɪbən/ AY-və-glay-bən) is a 2,493-seat hockey arena in Big Rapids, Michigan. It is home to the Ferris State Bulldogs men's ice hockey team of the CCHA. The building is attached the FSU Sports Complex, which also includes Wink Arena, a volleyball court, a studio ice rink, offices, concessions and meeting space. The ice arena also hosts the local high school and Big Rapids area junior hockey association. The arena is named for Dr. Robert L. Ewigleben, the former school president who was responsible for the building of the arena as well as the inception of Division I ice hockey at the school in 1979.

Its infamous student section is known as the "Dawg Pound", which has been known to find out the names of opposing goalies' mothers, which is used in a "colorful" chant.

In March 2008, the Ferris State Board of Trustees approved a $3.3 million renovation project for the arena, which will included a new playing surface, new boards and upgrades to the locker rooms. The renovation was scheduled to be completed by September 2008.
