= List of Augustana (South Dakota) Vikings men's ice hockey seasons =

This is a list of seasons completed by the Augustana University men's ice hockey team. The list documents the season-by-season records of the Vikings from the team's promotion to Division I in 2023 to present, including postseason results.

== Season-by-season results ==
Note: GP = Games played, W = Wins, L = Losses, T = Ties

NCAA D-I Champions	NCAA Frozen Four	Conference Regular Season Champions	Conference Playoff Champions

Season	Conference	Regular season (Note: Code explanation; GP—Games Played, W—Wins, L—Losses, T—Tied games, OTW—Overtime Wins*, OTL—Overtime Losses*, SOW—Shutout Wins*, Pts—Points*)														Conference Tournament Results	National Tournament Results
Season	Conference	Conference									Overall					Conference Tournament Results	National Tournament Results
Season	Conference	GP	W	L	T	OTW	OTL	SOW	Pts*	Finish	GP	W	L	T	%	Conference Tournament Results	National Tournament Results
Division I
Garrett Raboin (2023 — Present)
2023–24	CCHA	—	—	—	—	—	—	—	—	—	34	12	18	4	.412		
2024–25	CCHA	16	9	5	2	1	1	1	.625	2nd	35	18	13	4	.571	Lost Quarterfinal series, 1–2 (Bemidji State)	
Totals											GP	W	L	T	%	Championships	
Regular Season											66	29	29	8	.500		
Conference Post-season											3	1	2	0	.333		
NCAA Post-season											0	0	0	0	–		
Regular Season and Post-season Record											69	30	31	8	.493		

* Winning percentage is used when conference schedules are unbalanced.
