= 2024–25 Michigan Tech Huskies men's ice hockey season =

- Conference: 5th CCHA
- Home ice: MacInnes Student Ice Arena

Rankings
- USCHO: NR
- USA Hockey: NR

Record
- Overall: 16–17–3
- Conference: 12–11–3
- Home: 7–9–0
- Road: 7–6–3
- Neutral: 2–2–0

Coaches and captains
- Head coach: Joe Shawhan
- Assistant coaches: Tyler Shelast; Jordy Murray; Raymond Brice
- Captain: Jack Works
- Alternate captain(s): Isaac Gordon; Alex Nordstrom; Chase Pietila; Trevor Russell

The 2024–25 Michigan Tech Huskies men's ice hockey season was the 104th season of play for the program and 7th in the CCHA. The Huskies represented Michigan Technological University in the 2024–25 NCAA Division I men's ice hockey season, played their home games at MacInnes Student Ice Arena and were coached by Joe Shawhan in his 8th season.

== Season ==
With nearly half of the roster changing in the offseason, Michigan Tech had an uphill climb in its pursuit of another NCAA tournament berth. Max Väyrynen, who had served as a backup for the previous two seasons, finally got his shot at the starting role. The junior netminder shared the net with grad transfer Derek Mullahy in the first month with both looking capable through the first month on play. Unfortunately, Väyrynen suffered an injury in early November and would end up missing the remainder of the season. Mullahy took control of the crease and played well for the rest of the first half. The Huskies entered the winter break with a solid record and a good chance to make waves despite the offense being a bit inconsistent at times.

As the team was preparing to play in two in-season tournaments after Christmas, Ryan Manzella was brought in to backup Mullahy. Despite their record, the Huskies were stuck in the middle of the PairWise rankings due to the poor performance of the CCHA in non-conference play. However, the team was presented with an excellent chance to move up not only with the two tournament but also the strength of several of their opponents. First up, Tech faced off against high-ranked Western Michigan. The Broncos built a 2-goal lead midway through the game and were still up by a pair with less than 10 minutes to play. The Huskies offense woke up in the latter stages and battled back with two goals to tie the match and send it into overtime. Unfortunately, the team was unable to capitalize on their opportunity and surrendered a 3-on-3 goal less than a minute into extra time. To make matters worse, their next opponent was Northern Michigan who, aside from being a fellow CCHA team, was dead-last in the national rankings and would not give Tech any real bump. Manzella was given his first taste of the college game in what the team believed was an easy match. Things looked to be going according to plan but the Huskies got into penalty trouble in the match and squandered a 2-goal lead and gave up 3 power play goals. Fortunately, Logan Morrell saved the day with an overtime winner and prevented Tech from suffering an inexcusable loss.

The Huskies had a similar chance the following week when the opened the Coachella Valley Cactus Cup against #10 Massachusetts Lowell. Mullahy turned in another performance in goal but the offense to take advantage of a poor game by the River Hawks netminder. Tech was only able to get the puck on goal 15 times in the game, including just once in the second period, but still managed to score two goals. However, the team came up one shy of another overtime match and were sent to their second consolation game of the year. While they did manage to defeat Holy Cross, the missed opportunities meant that Michigan Tech now had virtually no chance of an at-large bid. With a conference title as their only viable route to the tournament, Tech soon had to rely on their new goaltender as Mullahy stumbled with a pair of off nights. Fortunately, Manzella swiftly became accustomed to the higher level of play and reeled off three shutouts in four starts. As January ended, the team looked poised to make another deep run in the conference tournament.

Over the final month and half of the season, however, Michigan Tech imploded. The Huskies suddenly found it impossible to keep the puck out of the net with both Manzella and Mullahy struggling between the pipes. Even with several good games from the offense, the team was only able to win once in its final eight regular season games. As the losses piled up, Tech fell down the standings and ended the year 5th in the CCHA. The precipitous fall meant that the team would not get an advantageous match in the quarterfinals and would have to start the postseason on the road. Manzella, who had been playing moderately better at the end selected as the starter but likely wouldn't have mattered who was in goal. Tech's offense vanished come playoff time and the team scored 1 goal in two games, getting swept out of the postseason for the first time in five years.

== Departures ==
| Player | Position | Nationality | Cause |
|---|---|---|---|
| Tyrone Bronte | Forward | Australia | Graduation (signed with KHL Sisak) |
| Arvid Caderoth | Forward | Sweden | Graduation (signed with Fort Wayne Komets) |
| Lachlan Getz | Defenseman | United States | Transferred to Holy Cross |
| Kyle Kukkonen | Forward | United States | Transferred to Wisconsin |
| Cameron Moger | Defenseman | Canada | Signed professional contract (Munkedals BK) |
| Michael Morelli | Goaltender | United States | Left program (retired) |
| Rylan Mosley | Forward | Canada | Graduate transfer to Wisconsin |
| Evan Orr | Defenseman | United States | Transferred to Stonehill |
| Blake Pietila | Goaltender | United States | Graduation (signed with Kalmar HC) |
| Jed Pietila | Defenseman | United States | Graduation (signed with Toledo Walleye) |
| Logan Pietila | Forward | United States | Graduation (signed with Wilkes-Barre/Scranton Penguins) |
| Kash Rasmussen | Forward | Canada | Transferred to Canisius |
| Levi Stauber | Forward | United States | Left program (retired) |
| Austen Swankler | Forward | United States | Signed professional contract (Fort Wayne Komets) |

== Recruiting ==
| Player | Position | Nationality | Age | Notes |
|---|---|---|---|---|
| Owen Baker | Forward | United States | 20 | Howell, MI; transfer from Michigan State |
| Rylan Brown | Defenseman | Canada | 19 | Sherwood Park, AB |
| Quinn Disher | Forward | Canada | 21 | Fort St. John, BC |
| Philip Fankl | Forward | Sweden | 20 | Stockholm, SWE |
| Viktor Hurtig | Defenseman | Sweden | 22 | Falun, SWE; transfer from Michigan State; selected 164th overall in 2021 |
| Elias Jansson | Forward | Finland | 19 | Oulu, FIN |
| Bryant Lee | Goaltender | United States | 18 | Houghton, MI |
| Tom Leppä | Forward | Finland | 19 | Kauniainen, FIN |
| Ryan Manzella | Goaltender | United States | 20 | Eagan, MN; joined mid-season |
| Ryder Matter | Forward | Canada | 20 | Beaumont, AB |
| Tyler Miller | Defenseman | Canada | 20 | Medicine Hat, AB |
| Logan Morrell | Forward | United States | 21 | Mesa, AZ |
| Derek Mullahy | Goaltender | United States | 23 | Scituate, MA; graduate transfer from Harvard |
| Stiven Sardarian | Forward | Russia | 21 | St. Petersburg, RUS; transfer from New Hampshire; selected 88th overall in 2021 |

== Roster ==
As of August 26, 2024.

| No. | Nat. | Player | Class | Pos | Height | Weight | DoB | Hometown | Previous team | NHL rights |
|---|---|---|---|---|---|---|---|---|---|---|
| 2 | (Finland) | Tom Leppä | Freshman | F | 6' 0" (1.83 m) | 183 lb (83 kg) | 2005-07-31 | Kauniainen, Finland | Fargo Force (USHL) | — |
| 3 | (Canada) | Rylan Brown | Freshman | D | 6' 0" (1.83 m) | 161 lb (73 kg) | 2005-01-23 | Sherwood Park, Alberta | Okotoks Oilers (BCHL) | — |
| 4 | (United States) | Henry Bartle | Sophomore | F | 6' 2" (1.88 m) | 185 lb (84 kg) | 2003-06-03 | Blaine, Minnesota | Des Moines Buccaneers (USHL) | — |
| 6 | (Russia) | Stiven Sardarian | Junior | F | 6' 1" (1.85 m) | 170 lb (77 kg) | 2003-02-07 | Saint Petersburg, Russia | New Hampshire (HEA) | BUF, 88th overall 2021 |
| 7 | (Finland) | Kasper Vähärautio | Junior | D | 6' 0" (1.83 m) | 187 lb (85 kg) | 2002-10-02 | Helsinki, Finland | Jokerit U20 (U20 SM-sarja) | — |
| 8 | (United States) | Trevor Russell (A) | Senior | D | 6' 2" (1.88 m) | 197 lb (89 kg) | 2000-02-02 | Old Hickory, Tennessee | Aberdeen Wings (NAHL) | — |
| 9 | (United States) | Logan Morrell | Freshman | F | 6' 3" (1.91 m) | 194 lb (88 kg) | 2003-08-02 | Mesa, Arizona | Langley Rivermen (BCHL) | — |
| 10 | (Finland) | Elias Jansson | Freshman | F | 6' 0" (1.83 m) | 187 lb (85 kg) | 2005-04-13 | Oulu, Finland | Oulun Kärpät J20 (U20 SM-sarja) | — |
| 11 | (United States) | Owen Baker | Sophomore | F | 5' 10" (1.78 m) | 185 lb (84 kg) | 2004-01-29 | Howell, Michigan | Michigan State (Big Ten) | — |
| 12 | (Sweden) | Philip Fankl | Freshman | F | 6' 3" (1.91 m) | 203 lb (92 kg) | 2004-09-19 | Stockholm, Sweden | Leksands IF J20 (J20 Nationell) | — |
| 13 | (Canada) | Tyler Miller | Freshman | D | 6' 0" (1.83 m) | 176 lb (80 kg) | 2004-09-16 | Medicine Hat, Alberta | Waterloo Black Hawks (USHL) | — |
| 14 | (Finland) | Max Koskipirtti | Sophomore | F | 6' 0" (1.83 m) | 180 lb (82 kg) | 2004-08-16 | Espoo, Finland | Kiekko-Espoo U20 (U20 SM-sarja) | — |
| 15 | (Canada) | Matthew Campbell | Junior | D | 6' 1" (1.85 m) | 165 lb (75 kg) | 2003-03-04 | North Vancouver, British Columbia | Quinnipiac (ECAC) | — |
| 16 | (Canada) | Isaac Gordon (A) | Sophomore | F | 5' 11" (1.8 m) | 190 lb (86 kg) | 2004-01-29 | Landmark, Manitoba | Sioux Falls Stampede (USHL) | — |
| 17 | (United States) | Chase Pietila (A) | Sophomore | D | 6' 3" (1.91 m) | 188 lb (85 kg) | 2004-03-03 | Howell, Michigan | Youngstown Phantoms (USHL) | PIT, 111th overall 2024 |
| 18 | (United States) | Alex Nordstrom (A) | Senior | F | 5' 11" (1.8 m) | 165 lb (75 kg) | 2000-11-15 | Atlantic Mine, Michigan | Green Bay Gamblers (USHL) | — |
| 19 | (United States) | Nick Williams | Sophomore | D | 5' 10" (1.78 m) | 177 lb (80 kg) | 2002-09-21 | Edina, Minnesota | Youngstown Phantoms (USHL) | — |
| 20 | (Canada) | Ryder Matter | Freshman | F | 6' 0" (1.83 m) | 185 lb (84 kg) | 2004-09-15 | Beaumont, Alberta | Spruce Grove Saints (BCHL) | — |
| 21 | (United States) | Blais Richartz | Graduate | F | 6' 0" (1.83 m) | 185 lb (84 kg) | 2000-06-23 | Menomonie, Wisconsin | Lincoln Stars (USHL) | — |
| 22 | (Sweden) | Marcus Pedersen | Senior | F | 6' 3" (1.91 m) | 187 lb (85 kg) | 2001-05-25 | Stockholm, Sweden | Malmö Redhawks J20 (J20 Nationell) | — |
| 23 | (United States) | Trevor Kukkonen | Junior | F | 5' 11" (1.8 m) | 181 lb (82 kg) | 2001-02-01 | Maple Grove, Minnesota | Minnesota Magicians (NAHL) | — |
| 24 | (United States) | Oliver Bezick | Junior | D | 6' 0" (1.83 m) | 190 lb (86 kg) | 2001-06-12 | Delray Beach, Florida | Amarillo Wranglers (NAHL) | — |
| 26 | (Sweden) | Viktor Hurtig | Junior | D | 6' 6" (1.98 m) | 197 lb (89 kg) | 2002-04-28 | Avesta, Sweden | Michigan State (Big Ten) | NJD, 164th overall 2021 |
| 27 | (Finland) | Lauri Raiman | Sophomore | F | 5' 11" (1.8 m) | 181 lb (82 kg) | 2004-01-27 | Vantaa, Finland | Lahti Pelicans U20 (U20 SM-sarja) | — |
| 28 | (Canada) | Quinn Disher | Freshman | F | 6' 0" (1.83 m) | 181 lb (82 kg) | 2003-06-23 | Fort St. John, British Columbia | Wisconsin Windigo (NAHL) | — |
| 29 | (Canada) | Jack Works (C) | Senior (RS) | F | 6' 0" (1.83 m) | 185 lb (84 kg) | 2001-05-23 | Yellowknife, Northwest Territories | Denver (NCHC) | — |
| 30 | (Finland) | Max Väyrynen | Junior | G | 6' 2" (1.88 m) | 183 lb (83 kg) | 2002-06-18 | Espoo, Finland | Porin Ässät U20 (U20 SM-sarja) | — |
| 31 | (United States) | Bryant Lee | Freshman | G | 6' 0" (1.83 m) | 170 lb (77 kg) | 2006-07-14 | Houghton, Michigan | Houghton High School (MHSAA) | — |
| 35 | (United States) | Derek Mullahy | Senior (RS) | G | 6' 0" (1.83 m) | 190 lb (86 kg) | 2001-03-20 | Scituate, Massachusetts | Harvard (ECAC) | — |
| 37 | (United States) | Ryan Manzella | Freshman | G | 6' 0" (1.83 m) | 174 lb (79 kg) | 2004-03-17 | Eagan, Minnesota | Sioux Falls Stampede (USHL) | — |

== Standings ==
2024–25 Central Collegiate Hockey Association standings
| | Conference record | | | | | | | | | | | Overall record | | | | | |
| | GP | W | L | T | OTW | OTL | SW | PTS | PCT ^ | GF | GA | GP | W | L | T | GF | GA |
|---|---|---|---|---|---|---|---|---|---|---|---|---|---|---|---|---|---|
| #14 Minnesota State †* | 26 | 18 | 5 | 3 | 3 | 1 | 1 | 56 | .718 | 77 | 37 | 39 | 27 | 9 | 3 | 113 | 58 |
| Augustana | 16 | 9 | 5 | 2 | 1 | 1 | 1 | 30 | .625 | 48 | 37 | 35 | 18 | 13 | 4 | 97 | 75 |
| St. Thomas | 26 | 13 | 9 | 4 | 1 | 1 | 1 | 42 | .564 | 76 | 66 | 38 | 19 | 14 | 5 | 111 | 101 |
| Bowling Green | 26 | 12 | 10 | 4 | 2 | 3 | 2 | 43 | .551 | 69 | 63 | 36 | 18 | 14 | 4 | 90 | 85 |
| Michigan Tech | 26 | 12 | 11 | 3 | 1 | 1 | 1 | 40 | .513 | 75 | 69 | 36 | 16 | 17 | 3 | 95 | 96 |
| Ferris State | 26 | 12 | 13 | 1 | 1 | 0 | 0 | 36 | .462 | 74 | 81 | 36 | 13 | 20 | 3 | 89 | 128 |
| Bemidji State | 26 | 10 | 12 | 4 | 3 | 1 | 4 | 36 | .462 | 63 | 78 | 38 | 15 | 18 | 5 | 93 | 114 |
| Lake Superior State | 26 | 10 | 15 | 1 | 0 | 4 | 0 | 35 | .449 | 71 | 76 | 36 | 12 | 22 | 2 | 93 | 115 |
| Northern Michigan | 26 | 4 | 20 | 2 | 1 | 1 | 2 | 16 | .205 | 42 | 88 | 34 | 5 | 27 | 2 | 55 | 115 |
Championship: March 21, 2025 † indicates conference regular-season champion (MacNaughton Cup) * indicates conference tournament champion (Mason Cup)^ Because Augustana played a transition schedule of 16 games against conference opponents, winning percentage was used to determine conference position. Rankings: USCHO.com Top 20 Poll

== Schedule and results ==
| Date | Time | Opponent^{#} | Rank^{#} | Site | TV | Decision | Result | Attendance | Record |
Exhibition
| October 5 | 6:07 pm | Northern Michigan* | | MacInnes Student Ice Arena • Houghton, Michigan (Exhibition, Rivalry) | Midco Sports+ | Mullahy | W 4–3 | 4,071 | |
Regular Season
| October 11 | 7:07 pm | Alaska* | | MacInnes Student Ice Arena • Houghton, Michigan | Midco Sports+ | Väyrynen | W 2–1 ^{OT} | 3,156 | 1–0–0 |
| October 12 | 6:07 pm | Alaska* | | MacInnes Student Ice Arena • Houghton, Michigan | Midco Sports+ | Väyrynen | W 2–1 | 2,894 | 2–0–0 |
| October 25 | 7:07 pm | Clarkson* | | MacInnes Student Ice Arena • Houghton, Michigan | Midco Sports+ | Väyrynen | L 1–4 | 3,109 | 2–1–0 |
| October 26 | 6:07 pm | Clarkson* | | MacInnes Student Ice Arena • Houghton, Michigan | Midco Sports+ | Mullahy | L 1–2 ^{OT} | 3,116 | 2–2–0 |
| November 1 | 7:07 pm | at Northern Michigan | | Berry Events Center • Marquette, Michigan (Rivalry) | Midco Sports+ | Mullahy | W 3–0 | 4,272 | 3–2–0 (1–0–0) |
| November 2 | 6:07 pm | Northern Michigan | | MacInnes Student Ice Arena • Houghton, Michigan (Rivalry) | Midco Sports+ | Mullahy | W 6–3 | 3,136 | 4–2–0 (2–0–0) |
| November 8 | 7:07 pm | at Ferris State | | Ewigleben Arena • Big Rapids, Michigan | Midco Sports+ | Väyrynen | W 3–2 | 1,159 | 5–2–0 (3–0–0) |
| November 9 | 6:07 pm | at Ferris State | | Ewigleben Arena • Big Rapids, Michigan | Midco Sports+ | Mullahy | W 3–1 | 1,321 | 6–2–0 (4–0–0) |
| November 22 | 7:07 pm | #17 Minnesota State | | MacInnes Student Ice Arena • Houghton, Michigan | Midco Sports+ | Mullahy | L 2–5 | 2,770 | 6–3–0 (4–1–0) |
| November 23 | 6:07 pm | #17 Minnesota State | | MacInnes Student Ice Arena • Houghton, Michigan | Midco Sports+ | Mullahy | L 1–3 | 2,810 | 6–4–0 (4–2–0) |
| November 29 | 7:07 pm | at Bowling Green | | Slater Family Ice Arena • Bowling Green, Ohio | Midco Sports+ | Mullahy | W 3–0 | 1,857 | 7–4–0 (5–2–0) |
| November 30 | 7:07 pm | at Bowling Green | | Slater Family Ice Arena • Bowling Green, Ohio | Midco Sports+ | Mullahy | T 2–2 ^{SOL} | 1,785 | 7–4–1 (5–2–1) |
| December 6 | 7:07 pm | St. Thomas | | MacInnes Student Ice Arena • Houghton, Michigan | Midco Sports+ | Mullahy | W 2–1 | 2,592 | 8–4–1 (6–2–1) |
| December 7 | 6:07 pm | St. Thomas | | MacInnes Student Ice Arena • Houghton, Michigan | Midco Sports+ | Mullahy | L 1–4 | 2,696 | 8–5–1 (6–3–1) |
| December 13 | 8:07 pm | at Bemidji State | | Sanford Center • Bemidji, Minnesota | Midco Sports+ | Mullahy | T 2–2 ^{SOL} | 1,926 | 8–5–2 (6–3–2) |
| December 14 | 7:07 pm | at Bemidji State | | Sanford Center • Bemidji, Minnesota | Midco Sports+ | Mullahy | W 9–5 | 1,856 | 9–5–2 (7–3–2) |
Great Lakes Invitational
| December 29 | 3:37 pm | vs. #6 Western Michigan* | | Van Andel Arena • Grand Rapids, Michigan (Great Lakes Invitational Semifinal) | Midco Sports+ | Mullahy | L 3–4 ^{OT} | 9,900 | 9–6–2 |
| December 30 | 3:30 pm | vs. Northern Michigan* | | Van Andel Arena • Grand Rapids, Michigan (Great Lakes Invitational Consolation Game, Rivalry) | Midco Sports+ | Manzella | W 4–3 ^{OT} | 6,857 | 10–6–2 |
Coachella Valley Cactus Cup
| January 3 | 6:30 pm | vs. #10 Massachusetts Lowell* | | Acrisure Arena • Thousand Palms, California (Cactus Cup Semifinal) | | Mullahy | L 2–3 | — | 10–7–2 |
| January 4 | 6:30 pm | vs. Holy Cross* | | Acrisure Arena • Thousand Palms, California (Cactus Cup Consolation Game) | | Manzella | W 4–3 | — | 11–7–2 |
| January 10 | 7:07 pm | Lake Superior State | | MacInnes Student Ice Arena • Houghton, Michigan | Midco Sports+ | Mullahy | L 2–4 | 3,096 | 11–8–2 (7–4–2) |
| January 11 | 6:07 pm | Lake Superior State | | MacInnes Student Ice Arena • Houghton, Michigan | Midco Sports+ | Manzella | W 1–0 | 3,373 | 12–8–2 (8–4–2) |
| January 17 | 8:07 pm | at #12 Minnesota State | | Mayo Clinic Health System Event Center • Mankato, Minnesota | Midco Sports+ | Mullahy | L 2–5 | 4,279 | 12–9–2 (8–5–2) |
| January 18 | 7:07 pm | at #12 Minnesota State | | Mayo Clinic Health System Event Center • Mankato, Minnesota | Midco Sports+ | Manzella | W 1–0 ^{OT} | 4,825 | 13–9–2 (9–5–2) |
| January 24 | 7:07 pm | Northern Michigan | | MacInnes Student Ice Arena • Houghton, Michigan (Rivalry) | Midco Sports+ | Manzella | W 3–2 | 3,496 | 14–9–2 (10–5–2) |
| January 25 | 6:07 pm | at Northern Michigan | | Berry Events Center • Marquette, Michigan (Rivalry) | Midco Sports+ | Manzella | W 4–0 | 4,110 | 15–9–2 (11–5–2) |
| February 7 | 7:07 pm | Bemidji State | | MacInnes Student Ice Arena • Houghton, Michigan | Midco Sports+ | Manzella | L 3–5 | 3,856 | 15–10–2 (11–6–2) |
| February 8 | 6:07 pm | Bemidji State | | MacInnes Student Ice Arena • Houghton, Michigan | Midco Sports+ | Mullahy | L 5–6 ^{OT} | 3,821 | 15–11–2 (11–7–2) |
| February 14 | 8:07 pm | at Augustana | | Midco Arena • Sioux Falls, South Dakota | Midco Sports+ | Manzella | L 1–5 | 2,622 | 15–12–2 (11–8–2) |
| February 15 | 7:07 pm | at Augustana | | Midco Arena • Sioux Falls, South Dakota | Midco Sports+ | Mullahy | T 4–4 ^{SOW} | 3,094 | 15–12–3 (11–8–3) |
| February 21 | 7:07 pm | Ferris State | | MacInnes Student Ice Arena • Houghton, Michigan | Midco Sports+ | Manzella | W 6–1 | 3,085 | 16–12–3 (12–8–3) |
| February 22 | 6:07 pm | Ferris State | | MacInnes Student Ice Arena • Houghton, Michigan | Midco Sports+ | Mullahy | L 2–3 | 3,255 | 16–13–3 (12–9–3) |
| February 28 | 8:07 pm | at St. Thomas | | St. Thomas Ice Arena • Mendota Heights, Minnesota | Midco Sports+ | Manzella | L 3–4 | 968 | 16–14–3 (12–10–3) |
| March 1 | 7:07 pm | at St. Thomas | | St. Thomas Ice Arena • Mendota Heights, Minnesota | Midco Sports+ | Manzella | L 1–2 | 952 | 16–15–3 (12–11–3) |
CCHA Tournament
| March 7 | 7:07 pm | at Bowling Green* | | Slater Family Ice Arena • Bowling Green, Ohio (CCHA Quarterfinal Game 1) | Midco Sports+ | Manzella | L 1–2 ^{OT} | 1,750 | 16–16–3 |
| March 8 | 7:07 pm | at Bowling Green* | | Slater Family Ice Arena • Bowling Green, Ohio (CCHA Quarterfinal Game 2) | Midco Sports+ | Manzella | L 0–4 | 2,605 | 16–17–3 |
*Non-conference game. ^{#}Rankings from USCHO.com Poll. All times are in Eastern Time. Source:

== Scoring statistics ==
| Name | Position | Games | Goals | Assists | Points | PIM |
|---|---|---|---|---|---|---|
| Stiven Sardaryan | C/RW | 35 | 11 | 24 | 35 | 51 |
| Max Koskipirtti | C/W | 36 | 7 | 20 | 27 | 0 |
| Isaac Gordon | C | 36 | 7 | 19 | 26 | 8 |
| Elias Jansson | F | 36 | 12 | 11 | 23 | 4 |
| Chase Pietila | D | 36 | 7 | 15 | 22 | 52 |
| Logan Morrell | F | 32 | 11 | 10 | 21 | 29 |
| Rylan Brown | D | 36 | 3 | 15 | 18 | 14 |
| Jack Works | F | 31 | 5 | 10 | 15 | 20 |
| Matthew Campbell | D | 34 | 6 | 6 | 12 | 26 |
| Trevor Kukkonen | F | 35 | 3 | 7 | 10 | 6 |
| Alex Nordstrom | F | 31 | 7 | 2 | 9 | 16 |
| Marcus Pedersen | LW/RW | 29 | 4 | 4 | 8 | 8 |
| Nick Williams | D | 34 | 0 | 8 | 8 | 10 |
| Owen Baker | RW | 33 | 3 | 2 | 5 | 2 |
| Tom Leppä | C | 16 | 2 | 3 | 5 | 6 |
| Lauri Raiman | C/W | 35 | 1 | 4 | 5 | 4 |
| Viktor Hurtig | D | 35 | 1 | 4 | 5 | 10 |
| Kasper Vähärautio | D | 36 | 0 | 4 | 4 | 2 |
| Ryder Matter | F | 19 | 2 | 1 | 3 | 4 |
| Henry Bartle | F | 22 | 1 | 2 | 3 | 8 |
| Blais Richartz | F | 18 | 1 | 1 | 2 | 0 |
| Philip Fankl | C | 23 | 1 | 0 | 1 | 0 |
| Tyler Miller | D | 1 | 0 | 0 | 0 | 0 |
| Quinn Disher | F | 1 | 0 | 0 | 0 | 0 |
| Oliver Bezick | D | 5 | 0 | 0 | 0 | 0 |
| Max Väyrynen | G | 4 | 0 | 0 | 0 | 0 |
| Ryan Manzella | G | 15 | 0 | 0 | 0 | 0 |
| Derek Mullahy | G | 21 | 0 | 0 | 0 | 0 |
| Bench | – | – | – | – | – | 8 |
| Total | | | 95 | 172 | 267 | 288 |

== Goaltending statistics ==
| Name | Games | Minutes | Wins | Losses | Ties | Goals against | Saves | Shut outs | SV % | GAA |
|---|---|---|---|---|---|---|---|---|---|---|
| Max Väyrynen | 4 | 241:34 | 3 | 1 | 0 | 7 | 80 | 0 | .920 | 1.74 |
| Ryan Manzella | 15 | 821:18 | 7 | 6 | 0 | 34 | 328 | 3 | .906 | 2.48 |
| Derek Mullahy | 21 | 1118:08 | 6 | 10 | 3 | 50 | 452 | 2 | .900 | 2.68 |
| Empty Net | - | 28:32 | - | - | - | 5 | - | - | - | - |
| Total | 36 | 2209:32 | 16 | 17 | 3 | 96 | 860 | 5 | .900 | 2.61 |

== Rankings ==
| Poll | Week | | | | | | | | | | | | | | | | | | | | | | | | | | | |
| Poll | Pre | 1 | 2 | 3 | 4 | 5 | 6 | 7 | 8 | 9 | 10 | 11 | 12 | 13 | 14 | 15 | 16 | 17 | 18 | 19 | 20 | 21 | 22 | 23 | 24 | 25 | 26 | 27 (Final) |
|---|---|---|---|---|---|---|---|---|---|---|---|---|---|---|---|---|---|---|---|---|---|---|---|---|---|---|---|---|
| USCHO.com | NR | NR | NR | NR | NR | NR | NR | NR | NR | NR | NR | NR | – | NR | NR | NR | NR | NR | NR | NR | NR | NR | NR | NR | NR | NR | – | NR |
| USA Hockey | NR | NR | NR | NR | NR | NR | NR | NR | NR | NR | NR | NR | – | NR | NR | NR | NR | NR | NR | NR | NR | NR | NR | NR | NR | NR | NR | NR |

Note: USCHO did not release a poll in week 12 or 26.
Note: USA Hockey did not release a poll in week 12.

== Awards and honors ==
| Player | Award | Ref |
|---|---|---|
| Elias Jansson | CCHA Rookie of the Year | |
| Chase Pietila | CCHA Best Defensive Defenseman | |
| Chase Pietila | All-CCHA First Team | |
| Rylan Brown | CCHA All-Rookie Team | |
| Elias Jansson | CCHA All-Rookie Team | |
| Logan Morrell | CCHA All-Rookie Team | |
