= 2024–25 CCHA season =

- Season: 2024–25
- Conference: CCHA
- Division: Division I
- Sport: ice hockey
- Duration: October 4, 2024– March 27, 2025
- Number of teams: 9
- TV partner(s): Midco Sports+

NHL Entry Draft

Regular season
- Season champions: Minnesota State
- Season MVP: Alex Tracy
- Top scorer: Rhett Pitlick

CCHA tournament
- Tournament champions: Minnesota State
- Runners-up: St. Thomas
- Tournament MVP: Evan Murr
- Top scorer: Liam Malmquist (9)

NCAA tournament
- Bids: 1
- Record: 0–1
- Best Finish: Regional Semifinal
- Team(s): Minnesota State

The 2024–25 CCHA season was the 46th season of play for the Central Collegiate Hockey Association and occurred during the 2024–25 NCAA Division I men's ice hockey season. The season began on October 4, 2024, and concluded on March 27, 2027, with Minnesota State losing in the Fargo Regional Semifinal of the NCAA tournament.

== Augustana ==
In the off-season, the CCHA announced that the timeline for Augustana was being moved up. Rather than become a full conference member in 2025–26, the Vikings would be eligible for the conference tournament in 2024–25. As schedules had already been set before the announcement, the CCHA would use point percentage to determine Augustana's place in the standings.

== Coaches ==
Bowling Green hired Dennis Williams as a replacement for Ty Eigner. A Bowling Green graduate, Williams previous served as an interim head coach in 2010.

Dave Shyiak was hired as the fourth head coach for Northern Michigan, replacing the departed Grant Potulny.

=== Records ===
| Team | Head coach | Season at school | Record at school | CCHA record |
|---|---|---|---|---|
| Augustana | Garrett Raboin | 2 | 12–18–4 | 0–0–0 |
| Bemidji State | Tom Serratore | 24 | 388–360–99 | 41–30–5 |
| Bowling Green | Dennis Williams | 2 | 5–25–6 | 4–18–6 |
| Ferris State | Bob Daniels | 33 | 497–605–114 | 271–324–77 |
| Lake Superior State | Damon Whitten | 11 | 143–196–31 | 32–42–2 |
| Michigan Tech | Joe Shawhan | 8 | 138–103–26 | 43–25–8 |
| Minnesota State | Luke Strand | 2 | 18–15–4 | 12–10–2 |
| Northern Michigan | Dave Shyiak | 1 | 0–0–0 | 0–0–0 |
| St. Thomas | Enrico Blasi | 4 | 29–75–5 | 25–47–4 |

== Standings ==
2024–25 Central Collegiate Hockey Association standings
| | Conference record | | | | | | | | | | | Overall record | | | | | |
| | GP | W | L | T | OTW | OTL | SW | PTS | PCT ^ | GF | GA | GP | W | L | T | GF | GA |
|---|---|---|---|---|---|---|---|---|---|---|---|---|---|---|---|---|---|
| #14 Minnesota State †* | 26 | 18 | 5 | 3 | 3 | 1 | 1 | 56 | .718 | 77 | 37 | 39 | 27 | 9 | 3 | 113 | 58 |
| Augustana | 16 | 9 | 5 | 2 | 1 | 1 | 1 | 30 | .625 | 48 | 37 | 35 | 18 | 13 | 4 | 97 | 75 |
| St. Thomas | 26 | 13 | 9 | 4 | 1 | 1 | 1 | 42 | .564 | 76 | 66 | 38 | 19 | 14 | 5 | 111 | 101 |
| Bowling Green | 26 | 12 | 10 | 4 | 2 | 3 | 2 | 43 | .551 | 69 | 63 | 36 | 18 | 14 | 4 | 90 | 85 |
| Michigan Tech | 26 | 12 | 11 | 3 | 1 | 1 | 1 | 40 | .513 | 75 | 69 | 36 | 16 | 17 | 3 | 95 | 96 |
| Ferris State | 26 | 12 | 13 | 1 | 1 | 0 | 0 | 36 | .462 | 74 | 81 | 36 | 13 | 20 | 3 | 89 | 128 |
| Bemidji State | 26 | 10 | 12 | 4 | 3 | 1 | 4 | 36 | .462 | 63 | 78 | 38 | 15 | 18 | 5 | 93 | 114 |
| Lake Superior State | 26 | 10 | 15 | 1 | 0 | 4 | 0 | 35 | .449 | 71 | 76 | 36 | 12 | 22 | 2 | 93 | 115 |
| Northern Michigan | 26 | 4 | 20 | 2 | 1 | 1 | 2 | 16 | .205 | 42 | 88 | 34 | 5 | 27 | 2 | 55 | 115 |
Championship: March 21, 2025 † indicates conference regular-season champion (MacNaughton Cup) * indicates conference tournament champion (Mason Cup)^ Because Augustana played a transition schedule of 16 games against conference opponents, winning percentage was used to determine conference position. Rankings: USCHO.com Top 20 Poll

== Non-conference record ==
The CCHA had a poor non-conference record for the season. Only three of the nine conference members (barely) finished with winning marks in non-conference play. Even then, however, many of the wins were collected from Atlantic Hockey America or from independent programs that were not highly ranked. As a result, the CCHA had only one team (Minnesota State) consistently appear in the top half of the PairWise rankings, and the conference was unable to secure an at-large bid to the NCAA tournament.

=== Regular season record ===
| Team | AHA | Big Ten | ECAC Hockey | Hockey East | Independent | NCHC | Total |
|---|---|---|---|---|---|---|---|
| Augustana | 0–0–0 | 0–0–0 | 0–0–0 | 0–0–0 | 4–5–1 | 4–2–0 | 8–7–1 |
| Bemidji State | 0–0–0 | 1–1–0 | 0–0–0 | 0–0–0 | 0–0–0 | 2–3–1 | 3–4–1 |
| Bowling Green | 4–0–0 | 0–2–0 | 0–0–0 | 0–0–0 | 0–0–0 | 0–1–0 | 4–3–0 |
| Ferris State | 0–0–0 | 0–1–0 | 1–1–0 | 0–0–0 | 0–1–0 | 0–2–2 | 1–5–2 |
| Lake Superior State | 0–0–0 | 0–4–0 | 0–0–0 | 0–0–0 | 2–1–1 | 0–0–0 | 2–5–1 |
| Michigan Tech | 1–0–0 | 0–0–0 | 0–2–0 | 0–1–0 | 2–0–0 | 0–1–0 | 3–4–0 |
| Minnesota State | 0–0–0 | 1–1–0 | 0–0–0 | 1–1–0 | 0–0–0 | 3–1–0 | 5–3–0 |
| Northern Michigan | 0–0–0 | 0–1–0 | 0–0–0 | 0–0–0 | 1–1–0 | 0–4–0 | 1–6–0 |
| St. Thomas | 0–0–0 | 0–2–0 | 0–0–0 | 1–0–1 | 2–0–0 | 0–2–0 | 3–4–1 |
| Overall | 5–0–0 | 2–12–0 | 1–3–0 | 2–2–1 | 11–8–2 | 9–16–3 | 30–41–6 |

== Statistics ==
=== Leading scorers ===
GP = Games played; G = Goals; A = Assists; Pts = Points; PIM = Penalty minutes

| Player | Class | Team | GP | G | A | Pts | PIM |
|---|---|---|---|---|---|---|---|
| Rhett Pitlick | Senior | Minnesota State | 26 | 10 | 20 | 30 | 14 |
| Lucas Wahlin | Junior | St. Thomas | 26 | 14 | 15 | 29 | 40 |
| Ryan O'Hara | Senior | Bowling Green | 26 | 10 | 18 | 28 | 12 |
| Liam Malmquist | Senior | St. Thomas | 26 | 11 | 16 | 27 | 4 |
| Josh Groll | Graduate | Minnesota State | 25 | 9 | 15 | 24 | 29 |
| Stiven Sardarian | Junior | Michigan Tech | 25 | 7 | 17 | 24 | 41 |
| Max Koskipirtti | Sophomore | Michigan Tech | 26 | 6 | 17 | 23 | 0 |
| Cole Burtch | Sophomore | Ferris State | 25 | 5 | 18 | 23 | 28 |
| Evan Murr | Sophomore | Minnesota State | 26 | 5 | 17 | 22 | 6 |
| Isaac Gordon | Sophomore | Michigan Tech | 26 | 6 | 15 | 21 | 8 |
| Cooper Gay | Junior | St. Thomas | 23 | 11 | 10 | 21 | 2 |

=== Leading goaltenders ===
Minimum 1/3 of team's minutes played in conference games.
GP = Games played; Min = Minutes played; W = Wins; L = Losses; T = Ties; GA = Goals against; SO = Shutouts; SV% = Save percentage; GAA = Goals against average

| Player | Class | Team | GP | Min | W | L | T | GA | SO | SV% | GAA |
|---|---|---|---|---|---|---|---|---|---|---|---|
| Alex Tracy | Junior | Minnesota State | 25 | 1514:48 | 17 | 5 | 3 | 36 | 2 | .947 | 1.43 |
| Christian Stoever | Senior | Bowling Green | 14 | 833:59 | 9 | 2 | 3 | 28 | 2 | .938 | 2.01 |
| Josh Kotai | Sophomore | Augustana | 15 | 847:46 | 9 | 4 | 1 | 29 | 1 | .931 | 2.05 |
| Jake Sibell | Junior | St. Thomas | 13 | 750:27 | 9 | 2 | 2 | 27 | 1 | .933 | 2.16 |
| Ryan Manzella | Freshman | Michigan Tech | 11 | 583:03 | 5 | 4 | 0 | 24 | 3 | .908 | 2.47 |

== Bracket ==
Quarterfinals; March 7–9
1 | Minnesota State | 4 | 3 | –
8 | Lake Superior State | 1 | 2 | –
2 | Augustana | 3 | 3 | 2
7 | Bemidji State | 1 | 4 | 3*
(Teams are reseeded after the Quarterfinal round)
3 | St. Thomas | 7 | 4 | –
6 | Ferris State | 3 | 1 | –
4 | Bowling Green | 2** | 4 | –
5 | Michigan Tech | 1 | 0 | –

Semifinals; March 15
1 | Minnesota State | 4
7 | Bemidji State | 0
3 | St. Thomas | 3
4 | Bowling Green | 1

Championship; March 21
1 | Minnesota State | 4
3 | St. Thomas | 2

Note: * denotes overtime period(s)

== NCAA tournament ==
=== Regional semifinals ===
| March 27, 2025; 4:00 pm | (1) Western Michigan | 2–1 (2OT) (0–0, 1–0, 0–1, 0–0, 1–0) | (4) Minnesota State | Scheels Arena; Attendance: 4,817 |

Game reference

Hampton Slukynsky
Goalies
Alex Tracy
Referees:
Jim Curtin
Jeremy Tufts
Linesmen:
Kevin Briganti
Nick Briganti

| (Michaels) Liam Valente (13) – PP – 20:48 | 1–0 |
| | 1–1 | 41:51 – Kaden Bohlsen (12) (Krajnik, Murr) |
| (Nehring, Valente) Grant Slukynsky (10) – GW – 87:14 | 2–1 |

2 min
Penalties
4 min
44
Shots
29

Game summary
The game started with a bang as both teams laid big hits on one another. The temperature cooled down a bit after the first minute but both squads skated up and down the ice as they looked for an early goal. During one such rush, WMU was able to turn the puck over in the Mavericks' end and, in reply, Jordan Power was called for tripping when he tried to prevent an open shot at his goal. Western had one of the best power plays in the country but MSU was able to match with a stelar kill. The few shots that made it through to Alex Tracy weren't too dangerous and Minnesota State was able to survive. The Mavericks turned defense to offense and immediately went on the attack. They were able to get a 3-on-2 but the Bronco defenders were able to limit them to a sharp-angle shot from the wall. Chances came fast and furious for both sides but both netminders looked to be on their respective games. A heavy hit by Campbell Cichosz on Owen Michaels in the corner looked to stun the Western forward but the Broncos were still able to tilt the ice towards the Mavericks' end in the middle of the period. Minnesota State was able to counter after WMU iced the puck but the Mavericks missed on a couple of passing plays and never ended up with a decent shot on goal. The fast and physical play continued and both benches called for penalties but the referees allowed play to continue. With about 6 minutes to go, MSU got on another odd-man rush but saw the opportunity go for naught when the play was blown dead for offsides. Minnesota State continued to let chances melt down and get low-percentage chances on goal but the continual puck possession in the WMU end prevented the Broncos from getting anything going in the later half of the period. The first real scoring opportunity came with two and half minutes left when Evan Murr launched an off-balance point shot that was deflected en route and just barely stopped by Hampton Slukynsky. Despite the up and down action, neither team took any real risks during the period until the waning seconds. Alex Bump was able to sneak past the MSU defense and streak in on Tracy. However, just as he was going to shoot, Adam Eisele slashed his stick and was called for a minor penalty. The first 16 seconds of the man-advantage did not produce any results with the rest being held over to the start of the second.

Western swiftly got the puck into the zone but had trouble getting through the MSU defense. After a blocked shot, the Mavericks collected the puck but failed to clear and the rubber bounced to Liam Valente. The Bronco forward then walked to the center of the right circle and beat Tracy high-glove for the opening goal. WMU continued to press after the goal and forced Minnesota State into a few turnovers but they were unable to capitalize. With Western taking over the balance of play MSU needed someone to change the momentum and that's exactly when they got when Brett Moravec went on a solo rush up the ice. After splitting to Bronco defenders, Moravec was slashed by Joona Väisänen to give the Mavericks their first power play of the match. Unfortunately for Minnesota State, their passing continued to be poor and Western ended up getting better chances. Even when the Mavs were able to set up a one-timer, Murr's stick snapped and the Broncso were able to clear. It was only at the very end of the man-advantage that MSU was able to generate a good scoring chance but a sprawling Slukynsky just managed to keep the puck out of the net. After the power play, the game reverted back to a back-and-forth match with both defenses preventing any good shots on goal. Around the mid point of the period, Western's offense began to exert itself once more but Tracy remained stout and kept the puck out of the net. MSU countered after a few minutes and Will Hillman was able to get a puck through Slukynsky but it bounded to the side of the goal. The Mavericks were able to apply some offensive pressure but, again, several opportunities went by the wayside thanks to inaccurate or deflected passes. With under 5 minutes to play, Brian Carrabes fired a shot from the point that just missed the far corner of the net past a screed Slukynsky. MSU kept the puck in the WMU end for much of the remaining time but continued to be plagued by bad passes. With just seconds left, Josh Groll skated into the slot and received a pass from behind the net. He launched a one-timer on goal but the shot was low and Slukynsky was able to make a leg save to keep the Mavericks off of the scoresheet.

After opening the period by icing the puck, Minnesota State was able to get its offense into gear and not only set up in the zone but finally get a good shot on goal. Slukynsky was able to stop the initial shot from Murr but the rebound from Zach Krajnik bounced up toward the goal off a Bronco defender. As it was sliding towards the net, Kaden Bohlsen was the first one to reach the puck and he slammed it home to tie the match. End-to-end action persisted after the goal with both sides narrowly missing out on scoring chances. At around the 12-minute mark, Western appeared to commit a tripping penalty right in front of the Maverick net but neither referee made a call, much to the displeasure of Minnesota State. Fortunately for the Mavs, they were able to get control of the puck and push it back up the ice. With both teams not willing to take a risk and make a disastrous mistake, the game reverted to a tight-checking match but that didn't prevent the offenses from getting their chances. With about 9 minutes to play, MSU got on a late 2-on-1 but could not beat Slukynsky. Shortly afterwards, on a separate possession, Moravec attempted to lay a heavy hit on Bump but as the Bronco forward moved to avoid the check he caught a trailing leg and crashed to the ice. That play had the Western bench up in arms but the referees, perhaps as a makeup call, did not assess a penalty. Minnesota State continued to play physically, crashing into WMU players when the opportunities presented themselves and made use of the long leash provided by the refs. The final few minutes were played mostly in the Western end and Luigi Benincasa was nearly able to find the winning goal. With about 70 seconds left, The Maverick forward got a rebound right in front of the net and one-timed it towards the goal, the puck was rolling and he wasn't able to make good contact, causing the shot to just go off angle and bounce off the far post. However, neither team could find the winning tally and overtime was needed.

Western Michigan went on the attack at the start of OT but MSU's defense didn't crack. The kept up their physical play and then countered but were unable to get the puck past Slukynsky. A few minutes into the period, MSU committed three consecutive icings. In order to give his players a breather, head coach Luke Strand used his timeout. On the ensuing faceoff, the Mavs got control of the puck and skated it up the ice to take the pressure off. Minnesota State then began to establish zone time and got several good looks on goal but Western's sturdy defense was able to block the puck away. Even though only a few shots got through, Slukynsky still had to stay on the top of his game and stop several high-percentage chances. The middle of the period was typified by tight defense with the refs allowing both teams to commit letter-of-the-law penalties without punishment. MSU was able to take advantage of this and tilt the puck towards the Western end but that didn't prevent the Broncos from having chances of their own. Off of a faceoff in the Maverick end, Bump wired a shot high on goal but Tracy blocked it with his shoulder. A little later the Purple goaltender was called upon again to stop Grant Slukynsky at the side of the net and kept the game going. With five and half left in the period, Western committed an icing. With the players already tired from a long shift, it was Pat Ferschweiler's turn to call a timeout. About a minute later, Bump was able to find a streaking Michaels who went in alone on the MSU net but Tracy was able to make a glove save on a low shot. Both defenses were instrumental in keeping the puck out of the net for the final three minutes as both teams continued to press. With just a few seconds left, Bump found a rebound in front of the Minnesota State crease but he had to rush the shot and Alex Trace telescoped out to made the save just before the end of the period.

Western again was the first to the attack at the beginning of the fifth period and almost was able to find the net just seconds into the session. MSU replied soon thereafter and had their own glorious chance halted by Slukynsky. A few minutes later, WMU coughed up the puck deep in their own end but Luc Wilson had the puck knocked off of his blade as he tried to stickhandle around the Bronco netminder. About a minute later, Western nearly found the net when Wyatt Schingoethe got the puck alone in front of the goal. Tracy made two toe saves before stopping Tim Washe on a third to save the team's season. With both teams growing increasingly fatigued, the hitting tailed off but MSU remained the more physical of the two. Nearing the middle of the period, Zach Nehring threw a weak shot on goal that Tracy was not able to collect. Grant Slukynsky backhanded the rebound which deflected off of Wilson into the net, ending the game.

== Ranking ==
=== USCHO ===
| Team | Pre | 1 | 2 | 3 | 4 | 5 | 6 | 7 | 8 | 9 | 10 | 12 | 13 | 14 | 15 | 16 | 17 | 18 | 19 | 20 | 21 | 22 | 23 | 24 | 25 | Final |
|---|---|---|---|---|---|---|---|---|---|---|---|---|---|---|---|---|---|---|---|---|---|---|---|---|---|---|
| Augustana | NR | NR | NR | NR | NR | NR | NR | NR | NR | NR | NR | NR | NR | NR | NR | NR | 19 | 17 | NR | NR | NR | NR | NR | NR | NR | NR |
| Bemidji State | NR | NR | NR | NR | NR | NR | NR | NR | NR | NR | NR | NR | NR | NR | NR | NR | NR | NR | NR | NR | NR | NR | NR | NR | NR | NR |
| Bowling Green | NR | NR | NR | NR | NR | NR | NR | NR | NR | NR | NR | NR | NR | NR | NR | NR | NR | NR | NR | NR | NR | NR | NR | NR | NR | NR |
| Ferris State | NR | NR | NR | NR | NR | NR | NR | NR | NR | NR | NR | NR | NR | NR | NR | NR | NR | NR | NR | NR | NR | NR | NR | NR | NR | NR |
| Lake Superior State | NR | NR | NR | NR | NR | NR | NR | NR | NR | NR | NR | NR | NR | NR | NR | NR | NR | NR | NR | NR | NR | NR | NR | NR | NR | NR |
| Michigan Tech | NR | NR | NR | NR | NR | NR | NR | NR | NR | NR | NR | NR | NR | NR | NR | NR | NR | NR | NR | NR | NR | NR | NR | NR | NR | NR |
| Minnesota State | NR | 19 | 20 | 18 | 16 | 16 | 16 | 17 | 17 | 15 | 12 | 11 | 12 | 12 | 12 | 14 | 15 | 15 | 14 | 15 | 14 | 14 | 15 | 15 | 14 | 14 |
| Northern Michigan | NR | NR | NR | NR | NR | NR | NR | NR | NR | NR | NR | NR | NR | NR | NR | NR | NR | NR | NR | NR | NR | NR | NR | NR | NR | NR |
| St. Thomas | NR | NR | NR | NR | NR | NR | NR | NR | NR | NR | NR | NR | NR | NR | NR | NR | NR | NR | NR | NR | NR | NR | NR | NR | NR | NR |

Note: USCHO did not release a poll in week 12 or 26.

=== USA Hockey ===
| Team | Pre | 1 | 2 | 3 | 4 | 5 | 6 | 7 | 8 | 9 | 10 | 11 | 13 | 14 | 15 | 16 | 17 | 18 | 19 | 20 | 21 | 22 | 23 | 24 | 25 | 26 | Final |
|---|---|---|---|---|---|---|---|---|---|---|---|---|---|---|---|---|---|---|---|---|---|---|---|---|---|---|---|
| Augustana | NR | NR | NR | NR | NR | NR | NR | NR | NR | NR | NR | NR | NR | NR | NR | NR | NR | 17 | NR | 20 | NR | NR | NR | NR | NR | NR | NR |
| Bemidji State | NR | NR | NR | NR | NR | NR | NR | NR | NR | NR | NR | NR | NR | NR | NR | NR | NR | NR | NR | NR | NR | NR | NR | NR | NR | NR | NR |
| Bowling Green | NR | NR | NR | NR | NR | NR | NR | NR | NR | NR | NR | NR | NR | NR | NR | NR | NR | NR | NR | NR | NR | NR | NR | NR | NR | NR | NR |
| Ferris State | NR | NR | NR | NR | NR | NR | NR | NR | NR | NR | NR | NR | NR | NR | NR | NR | NR | NR | NR | NR | NR | NR | NR | NR | NR | NR | NR |
| Lake Superior State | NR | NR | NR | NR | NR | NR | NR | NR | NR | NR | NR | NR | NR | NR | NR | NR | NR | NR | NR | NR | NR | NR | NR | NR | NR | NR | NR |
| Michigan Tech | NR | NR | NR | NR | NR | NR | NR | NR | NR | NR | NR | NR | NR | NR | NR | NR | NR | NR | NR | NR | NR | NR | NR | NR | NR | NR | NR |
| Minnesota State | NR | 19 | NR | 16 | 16 | 18 | 16 | 17 | 17 | 15 | 13 | 12 | 12 | 12 | 12 | 14 | 15 | 15 | 15 | 15 | 17 | 16 | 16 | 15 | 14 | 15 | 15 |
| Northern Michigan | NR | NR | NR | NR | NR | NR | NR | NR | NR | NR | NR | NR | NR | NR | NR | NR | NR | NR | NR | NR | NR | NR | NR | NR | NR | NR | NR |
| St. Thomas | 20 | NR | NR | NR | NR | NR | NR | NR | NR | NR | NR | NR | NR | NR | NR | NR | NR | NR | NR | NR | NR | NR | NR | NR | NR | NR | NR |

Note: USA Hockey did not release a poll in week 12.

=== Pairwise ===
| Team | 1 | 2 | 3 | 4 | 5 | 6 | 7 | 8 | 9 | 10 | 11 | 13 | 14 | 15 | 16 | 17 | 18 | 19 | 20 | 21 | 22 | 23 | 24 | Final |
|---|---|---|---|---|---|---|---|---|---|---|---|---|---|---|---|---|---|---|---|---|---|---|---|---|
| Augustana | 28 | 52 | 10 | 20 | 20 | 23 | 17 | 21 | 21 | 23 | 30 | 31 | 17 | 21 | 23 | 21 | 19 | 24 | 21 | 33 | 34 | 36 | 33 | 34 |
| Bemidji State | 15 | 17 | 19 | 27 | 39 | 44 | 40 | 26 | 24 | 28 | 32 | 33 | 38 | 41 | 46 | 47 | 50 | 47 | 47 | 46 | 46 | 45 | 46 | 46 |
| Bowling Green | 4 | 9 | 15 | 45 | 32 | 29 | 36 | 35 | 48 | 45 | 46 | 44 | 36 | 38 | 39 | 42 | 40 | 39 | 37 | 42 | 42 | 39 | 38 | 38 |
| Ferris State | 21 | 37 | 41 | 50 | 56 | 60 | 60 | 60 | 58 | 54 | 55 | 55 | 56 | 56 | 56 | 57 | 49 | 52 | 53 | 53 | 53 | 53 | 53 | 53 |
| Lake Superior State | 27 | 49 | 42 | 53 | 52 | 35 | 47 | 44 | 34 | 36 | 36 | 38 | 42 | 45 | 43 | 44 | 46 | 46 | 46 | 48 | 47 | 49 | 49 | 47 |
| Michigan Tech | 28 | 42 | 40 | 36 | 27 | 19 | 19 | 36 | 31 | 30 | 29 | 29 | 30 | 32 | 30 | 30 | 28 | 37 | 37 | 38 | 39 | 46 | 45 | 45 |
| Minnesota State | 17 | 12 | 12 | 11 | 18 | 15 | 16 | 13 | 13 | 11 | 12 | 13 | 14 | 15 | 15 | 17 | 18 | 17 | 17 | 17 | 17 | 15 | 16 | 14 |
| Northern Michigan | 28 | 55 | 51 | 56 | 60 | 62 | 62 | 61 | 63 | 63 | 63 | 63 | 63 | 63 | 59 | 61 | 61 | 61 | 62 | 62 | 62 | 62 | 62 | 62 |
| St. Thomas | 28 | 28 | 48 | 39 | 38 | 49 | 49 | 40 | 50 | 45 | 48 | 49 | 47 | 47 | 45 | 46 | 43 | 42 | 43 | 41 | 37 | 35 | 32 | 31 |

Note: teams ranked in the top-10 automatically qualify for the NCAA tournament. Teams ranked 11-16 can qualify based upon conference tournament results.

== Awards ==
=== NCAA ===
AHCA All-American Teams
| West Second Team | Position |
|---|---|
| Alex Tracy, Minnesota State | G |

=== CCHA ===
| Award | | Recipient |
|---|---|---|
| Player of the Year | | Alex Tracy, Minnesota State |
| Forward of the Year | | Rhett Pitlick, Minnesota State |
| Defenseman of the Year | | Evan Murr, Minnesota State |
| Goaltender of the Year | | Alex Tracy, Minnesota State |
| Rookie of the Year | | Elias Jansson, Michigan Tech |
| Best Defensive Defenseman | | Chase Pietila, Michigan Tech |
| Best Defensive Forward | | Jackson Jutting, Bemidji State |
| Coach of the Year | | Luke Strand, Minnesota State |
| Tournament Most Valuable Player | | Evan Murr, Minnesota State |
All-CCHA Teams
| First Team | Position | Second Team |
| Alex Tracy, Minnesota State | G | Josh Kotai, Augustana |
| Evan Murr, Minnesota State | D | Travis Shoudy, Ferris State |
| Chase Pietila, Michigan Tech | D | Chase Foley, St. Thomas |
| Liam Malmquist, St. Thomas | F | Luke Mobley, Augustana |
| Rhett Pitlick, Minnesota State | F | Ryan O'Hara, Bowling Green |
| Lucas Wahlin, St. Thomas | F | Brody Waters, Bowling Green |
| Rookie Team | Position | |
| Rorke Applebee, Lake Superior State | G | |
| Rylan Brown, Michigan Tech | D | |
| Isa Parekh, Bemidji State | D | |
| Jakub Altrichter, Northern Michigan | F | |
| Elias Jansson, Michigan Tech | F | |
| Logan Morrell, Michigan Tech | F | |

== 2025 NHL entry draft ==
| Round | Pick | Player | College | NHL team |
|---|---|---|---|---|
| 7 | 209 | Maxon Vig ^{†} | Bemidji State | Montreal Canadiens |

† incoming freshman
