= 2024–25 St. Thomas (Minnesota) Tommies men's ice hockey season =

American college ice hockey team

2024–25 St. Thomas Tommies men's ice hockey season
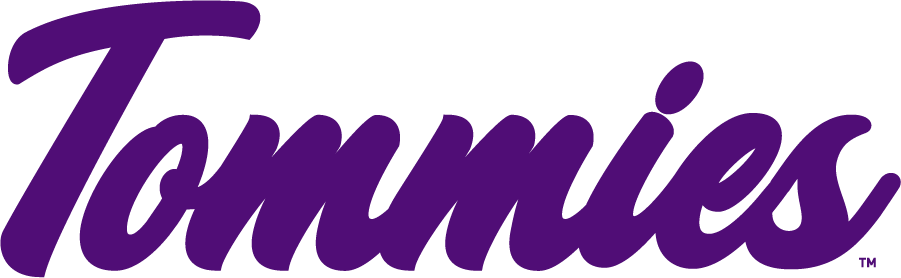
- Conference: 3rd CCHA
- Home ice: St. Thomas Ice Arena

Rankings
- USCHO: NR
- USA Hockey: NR

Record
- Overall: 19–14–5
- Conference: 13–9–4
- Home: 11–7–2
- Road: 8–6–3
- Neutral: 0–1–0

Coaches and captains
- Head coach: Enrico Blasi
- Assistant coaches: Leon Hayward; Cory Laylin
- Captain: Lucas Wahlin
- Alternate captain(s): Ethan Gauer; Cooper Gay; Matthew Gleason

The 2024–25 St. Thomas Tommies men's ice hockey season was the 101st season of play for the program, the 4th at the Division I level and the 4th in the CCHA. The Tommies represented the University of St. Thomas (Minnesota), played their home games at the St. Thomas Ice Arena and were coached by Enrico Blasi in his 4th season.

== Season ==
St. Thomas enters their 4th season in Division 1 with higher expectations after a 2nd-place finish in the CCHA the year before, by far their best in the league since moving from Division III. They have been on an upward trajectory since the move, winning 3 games in 2021–22, 11 in 2022–23, and 15 in 2023–24. They return 22 players from the prior season's roster, which is much higher than 13, 11, and 15 in 21–22, 22–23, and 23-24 respectively. They also return 6 of their top 7 point scorers from last season.

The program also has plenty to look forward to with the construction of Lee and Penny Anderson Arena that is expected to be ready to host games by the 2025–26 season, and a move to the NCHC beginning in 2026–27.

However, despite all the positive signs for the Tommies, the season did not begin well for the club. The offense was not able to coalesce in the first half with St. Thomas able to score three goals in less than half of their games. Even worse, neither Jake Sibell nor Aaron Trotter could find any consistency in goal. In a few of the games where the scoring did show up, the Tommies couldn't keep the puck out of their own net. The results was just 4 wins in 18 games and a national ranking nearing the 50s.

The second half of the year didn't start any better as they Tommies failed to capitalize on a sinking St. Cloud State team but that game appeared to be the turning point for the team. To that point, the team had been led by Liam Malmquist and Lucas Wahlin up front. The two put up solid number in the first half and were the driving force for the team's inadequate scoring. After the loss to the Huskies the two upperclassmen simply increased their output, particularly Wahlin, and resuscitated the season for St. Thomas. Thanks to the increased scoring, the Tommies were able to put together two separate 5-game winning streaks. The situation in net also slowly began to improve and, by the end of the year, Sibell was providing a solid effort in goal that not only provided the club with a winning record, but lifted St. Thomas up to 3rd in the conference.

The team was able to begin the postseason at home against Ferris State and use the match to their advantage. The Tommies preyed upon the weak Bulldog defense and scored 11 goals in 2 games. Malmquist increased his team-leading totals by contributing 6 points in the weekend and provide the team with its first playoff round victory since joining Division I. Fortune continued so smile on the program and, due to an upset in the first round, the team was able to play their semifinal game at home. Bowling Green proved a match for the team for 40 minutes, with the two teams entering the third knotted at 1-all. Malmquist's 19th of the season early in the frame gave the Tommies a narrow lead and then it was up to Sibell to hold the fort. The senior netminder stopped 16 shots in the period, preserving the lead for St. Thomas until Matthew Gleason was whistled for slashing and put his team on the penalty kill for the final 85 seconds. The Falcons pulled their netminder for a 2-man advantage and pressured the STU cage until Cooper Gay found a loose puck in his own zone, skated up the ice and popped the puck into the empty net to ensure the victory.

Entering the championship game, St. Thomas already knew that it would be their final match of the season. The reason for this was because, due to the program promoting from Division III in 2021, the Tommies were not eligible for the NCAA tournament until 2026. The club played well in the game, opening the scoring early in the second before Minnesota State pulled ahead. Malmquist tied the match with a power play marker before the third and the Tommies looked to be a match for the Mavericks. Near the middle of the final frame, MSU got the second lead and St. Thomas desperately searched for a third goal. Unfortunately, they were unable to break through and an empty-net goal from Minnesota State in the final minute sealed their fate.

== Departures ==
Player	Position	Nationality	Cause
Mack Byers	Forward	United States	Graduation (retired)
Luke Manning	Forward	United States	Graduation (signed with Utah Grizzlies)
James Marooney	Defenseman	United States	Graduation (signed with Adirondack Thunder)
Tim Piechowski	Forward	United States	Left program (retired)
Noah Prokop	Forward	United States	Graduation (signed with Toledo Walleye)
Cameron Recchi	Forward	United States	Transfer to Wisconsin-Eau Claire
Braidan Simmons-Fischer	Defenseman	United States	Transfer to Adrian

== Recruiting ==
Player	Position	Nationality	Age	Notes
Ray Christy	Forward	United States	25	Saint Paul, MN; graduate transfer from Colorado College
Ethan Elias	Defenseman	United States	21	Maple Grove, MN
Chase Foley	Defenseman	United States	24	Mendota Heights, MN; graduate transfer from Colorado College
Casy Laylin	Forward	United States	20	St. Michael, MN
Nick Mikan	Forward	United States	20	Edina, MN
Caige Sterzer	Forward	United States	24	Kimberley, BC; transfer from Lindenwood
Alexander Tell	Forward	United States	20	Linköping, SWE

== Roster ==
As of August 31, 2024.

No.	Nat.	Player	Class	Pos	Height	Weight	DoB	Hometown	Previous team	NHL rights
3	(United States)	Lucas Wahlin (C)	Junior	F	5' 11" (1.8 m)	160 lb (73 kg)	2001-05-03	Woodbury, Minnesota	Lincoln Stars (NAHL)	—
4	(United States)	Cole Miller	Sophomore	D	5' 11" (1.8 m)	185 lb (84 kg)	2002-08-27	Littleton, Colorado	Sioux Falls Stampede (USHL)	—
5	(United States)	Matthew Gleason (A)	Senior	F	5' 8" (1.73 m)	175 lb (79 kg)	2001-09-20	Saint Paul, Minnesota	Colorado College (NCHC)	—
6	(United States)	Jake Ratzlaff	Junior	D	6' 2" (1.88 m)	215 lb (98 kg)	2002-06-23	Rosemount, Minnesota	Madison Capitols (USHL)	—
7	(United States)	Chase Foley	Senior	D	5' 10" (1.78 m)	167 lb (76 kg)	2000-02-17	Mendota Heights, Minnesota	Colorado College (NCHC)	—
8	(Canada)	Caige Sterzer	Junior	F	6' 5" (1.96 m)	225 lb (102 kg)	2000-08-20	Kimberley, British Columbia	Lindenwood (NCAA)	—
9	(United States)	Casy Laylin	Freshman	F	5' 9" (1.75 m)	170 lb (77 kg)	2004-01-09	St. Michael, Minnesota	Salmon Arm Silverbacks (BCHL)	—
10	(United States)	Mason Poolman	Sophomore	D	6' 1" (1.85 m)	189 lb (86 kg)	2002-01-31	East Grand Forks, Minnesota	Penticton Vees (BCHL)	—
11	(United States)	Ryan O'Neill	Junior	F	5' 10" (1.78 m)	175 lb (79 kg)	2001-02-25	Roseville, Minnesota	St. Cloud Norsemen (NAHL)	—
12	(Sweden)	Alexander Tell	Freshman	F	6' 0" (1.83 m)	180 lb (82 kg)	2004-03-18	Linköping, Sweden	Linköping J20 (J20 Nationell)	—
13	(United States)	Ray Christy	Graduate	F	5' 10" (1.78 m)	175 lb (79 kg)	1999-09-15	St. Paul, Minnesota	Colorado College (NCHC)	—
14	(United States)	Jase Sofo	Sophomore	D	6' 4" (1.93 m)	190 lb (86 kg)	2002-06-25	Sylvania, Ohio	Amarillo Wranglers (NAHL)	—
15	(Canada)	Quinton Pepper	Junior	F	6' 3" (1.91 m)	187 lb (85 kg)	2002-01-31	London, Ontario	Steinbach Pistons (MJHL)	—
16	(United States)	Ethan Elias	Freshman	D	5' 8" (1.73 m)	187 lb (85 kg)	2003-04-03	Maple Grove, Minnesota	Madison Capitols (USHL)	—
17	(United States)	Jake Braccini	Junior	F	5' 11" (1.8 m)	192 lb (87 kg)	2001-07-02	Hanover, Minnesota	Muskegon Lumberjacks (USHL)	—
18	(United States)	Ethan Gauer (A)	Graduate	D	6' 0" (1.83 m)	185 lb (84 kg)	1999-12-23	Farmington, Minnesota	Bemidji State (WCHA)	—
19	(United States)	Luc Laylin	Junior	F	5' 8" (1.73 m)	170 lb (77 kg)	2001-12-30	St. Michael, Minnesota	Prince George Spruce Kings (BCHL)	—
20	(United States)	Cooper Gay (A)	Junior	F	6' 4" (1.93 m)	210 lb (95 kg)	2002-03-15	Edina, Minnesota	Fargo Force (USHL)	—
21	(United States)	Carson Peters	Junior	D	6' 3" (1.91 m)	200 lb (91 kg)	2002-10-28	Medina, Minnesota	Cedar Rapids RoughRiders (USHL)	—
24	(United States)	Grant Docter	Senior	D	5' 10" (1.78 m)	174 lb (79 kg)	2000-12-06	Golden Valley, Minnesota	Michigan Tech (CCHA)	—
25	(United States)	Liam Malmquist	Senior	F	5' 10" (1.78 m)	165 lb (75 kg)	2000-10-08	Edina, Minnesota	Wisconsin (Big Ten)	—
26	(United States)	Chase Cheslock	Sophomore	D	6' 3" (1.91 m)	205 lb (93 kg)	2004-10-25	Rogers, Minnesota	Omaha Lancers (USHL)	NJD, 154th overall 2023
27	(United States)	Ryder Donovan	Graduate	F	6' 3" (1.91 m)	203 lb (92 kg)	2000-10-04	Duluth, Minnesota	Wisconsin (Big Ten)	VGK, 110th overall 2019
28	(United States)	Nick Mikan	Freshman	F	6' 4" (1.93 m)	229 lb (104 kg)	2004-03-31	Edina, Minnesota	Vernon Vipers (BCHL)	—
29	(United States)	J. D. Metz	Sophomore	F/D	6' 2" (1.88 m)	195 lb (88 kg)	2002-10-24	Mahtomedi, Minnesota	New Mexico Ice Wolves (NAHL)	—
30	(United States)	Jake Sibell	Senior	G	6' 2" (1.88 m)	205 lb (93 kg)	2000-01-03	Isanti, Minnesota	Niagara (AHA)	—
31	(Canada)	Aaron Trotter	Junior	G	6' 2" (1.88 m)	170 lb (77 kg)	2001-04-07	Victoria, British Columbia	Prince George Spruce Kings (BCHL)	—
39	(Canada)	Maximilian Prazma	Sophomore	G	6' 4" (1.93 m)	200 lb (91 kg)	2002-01-12	Calgary, Alberta	Calgary Canucks (AJHL)	—
46	(Sweden)	Tobias Abrahamsson	Sophomore	D	6' 4" (1.93 m)	214 lb (97 kg)	2003-08-30	Jönköping, Sweden	HV71 J20 (J20 Nationell)	—

== Standings ==
2024–25 Central Collegiate Hockey Association standings
	Conference record											Overall record					
	GP	W	L	T	OTW	OTL	SW	PTS	PCT ^	GF	GA	GP	W	L	T	GF	GA
#14 Minnesota State †*	26	18	5	3	3	1	1	56	.718	77	37	39	27	9	3	113	58
Augustana	16	9	5	2	1	1	1	30	.625	48	37	35	18	13	4	97	75
St. Thomas	26	13	9	4	1	1	1	42	.564	76	66	38	19	14	5	111	101
Bowling Green	26	12	10	4	2	3	2	43	.551	69	63	36	18	14	4	90	85
Michigan Tech	26	12	11	3	1	1	1	40	.513	75	69	36	16	17	3	95	96
Ferris State	26	12	13	1	1	0	0	36	.462	74	81	36	13	20	3	89	128
Bemidji State	26	10	12	4	3	1	4	36	.462	63	78	38	15	18	5	93	114
Lake Superior State	26	10	15	1	0	4	0	35	.449	71	76	36	12	22	2	93	115
Northern Michigan	26	4	20	2	1	1	2	16	.205	42	88	34	5	27	2	55	115
Championship: March 21, 2025 † indicates conference regular-season champion (MacNaughton Cup) * indicates conference tournament champion (Mason Cup)^ Because Augustana played a transition schedule of 16 games against conference opponents, winning percentage was used to determine conference position. Rankings: USCHO.com Top 20 Poll

== Schedule and results ==
Date	Time	Opponent^{#}	Rank^{#}	Site	TV	Decision	Result	Attendance	Record
Regular Season
October 5	1:07 pm	Manitoba*		St. Thomas Ice Arena • Mendota Heights, Minnesota (Exhibition)	Midco		W 4–2		
October 6	5:07 pm	#16 St. Cloud State*		St. Thomas Ice Arena • Mendota Heights, Minnesota	Midco Sports+	Sibell	L 0–1	861	0–1–0
October 11	7:07 pm	Vermont*		St. Thomas Ice Arena • Mendota Heights, Minnesota	Midco Sports+	Sibell	T 5–5 ^{OT}	650	0–1–1
October 12	6:07 pm	Vermont*		St. Thomas Ice Arena • Mendota Heights, Minnesota	Midco Sports+	Trotter	W 3–1	813	1–1–1
October 25	5:30 pm	at #5 Minnesota*		3M Arena at Mariucci • Minneapolis, Minnesota	Fox 9+	Sibell	L 1–7	9,722	1–2–1
October 26	8:00 pm	vs. #5 Minnesota*		Xcel Energy Center • Saint Paul, Minnesota	Fox 9+	Trotter	L 2–6	10,104	1–3–1
November 1	7:07 pm	Augustana		St. Thomas Ice Arena • Mendota Heights, Minnesota	Midco Sports+	Trotter	W 4–0	826	2–3–1 (1–0–0)
November 2	6:07 pm	Augustana		St. Thomas Ice Arena • Mendota Heights, Minnesota	Midco Sports+	Trotter	L 2–3	906	2–4–1 (1–1–0)
November 8	7:07 pm	#16 Minnesota State		St. Thomas Ice Arena • Mendota Heights, Minnesota	Midco Sports+	Trotter	L 3–5	1,082	2–5–1 (1–2–0)
November 9	6:07 pm	at #16 Minnesota State		Mayo Clinic Health System Event Center • Mankato, Minnesota	Midco Sports+	Sibell	T 1–1 ^{SOL}	4,463	2–5–2 (1–2–1)
November 15	7:07 pm	Bowling Green		St. Thomas Ice Arena • Mendota Heights, Minnesota	Midco Sports+	Sibell	T 2–2 ^{SOL}	653	2–5–3 (1–2–2)
November 16	6:07 pm	Bowling Green		St. Thomas Ice Arena • Mendota Heights, Minnesota	Midco Sports+	Trotter	W 6–3	524	3–5–3 (2–2–2)
November 22	7:07 pm	at Bemidji State		Sanford Center • Bemidji, Minnesota	Midco Sports+	Trotter	T 2–2 ^{SOL}	2,097	3–5–4 (2–2–3)
November 23	6:07 pm	at Bemidji State		Sanford Center • Bemidji, Minnesota	Midco Sports+	Sibell	L 1–2	2,082	3–6–4 (2–3–3)
November 29	7:07 pm	Lake Superior State		St. Thomas Ice Arena • Mendota Heights, Minnesota	Midco Sports+	Sibell	L 2–4	715	3–7–4 (2–4–3)
November 30	6:07 pm	Lake Superior State		St. Thomas Ice Arena • Mendota Heights, Minnesota	Midco Sports+	Trotter	L 3–5	577	3–8–4 (2–5–3)
December 6	6:07 pm	at Michigan Tech		MacInnes Student Ice Arena • Houghton, Michigan	Midco Sports+	Trotter	L 1–2	2,592	3–9–4 (2–6–3)
December 7	5:07 pm	at Michigan Tech		MacInnes Student Ice Arena • Houghton, Michigan	Midco Sports+	Sibell	W 4–1	2,696	4–9–4 (3–6–3)
December 29	4:07 pm	at #12 St. Cloud State*		Herb Brooks National Hockey Center • St. Cloud, Minnesota	Fox 9+	Trotter	L 1–2	3,531	4–10–4
January 3	7:30 pm	at Lindenwood*		Centene Community Ice Center • St. Charles, Missouri		Trotter	W 3–2 ^{OT}	627	5–10–4
January 4	4:30 pm	at Lindenwood*		Centene Community Ice Center • St. Charles, Missouri		Trotter	W 4–2	597	6–10–4
January 10	7:07 pm	Ferris State		St. Thomas Ice Arena • Mendota Heights, Minnesota	Midco Sports+	Sibell	W 9–6	841	7–10–4 (4–6–3)
January 11	6:07 pm	Ferris State		St. Thomas Ice Arena • Mendota Heights, Minnesota	Midco Sports+	Sibell	W 4–3	—	8–10–4 (5–6–3)
January 17	6:07 pm	at Lake Superior State		Taffy Abel Arena • Sault Ste. Marie, Michigan	Midco Sports+	Sibell	W 4–3 ^{OT}	1,234	9–10–4 (6–6–3)
January 18	5:07 pm	at Lake Superior State		Taffy Abel Arena • Sault Ste. Marie, Michigan	Midco Sports+	Trotter	T 3–3 ^{SOW}	—	9–10–5 (6–6–4)
January 25	6:07 pm	Bemidji State		St. Thomas Ice Arena • Mendota Heights, Minnesota	Midco Sports+	Trotter	W 3–2	987	10–10–5 (7–6–4)
January 26	3:07 pm	Bemidji State		St. Thomas Ice Arena • Mendota Heights, Minnesota	Midco Sports+	Trotter	L 1–2	954	10–11–5 (7–7–4)
January 31	7:07 pm	at #15 Minnesota State		Mayo Clinic Health System Event Center • Mankato, Minnesota	Midco Sports+	Trotter	W 3–2	4,694	11–11–5 (8–7–4)
February 1	6:07 pm	#15 Minnesota State		St. Thomas Ice Arena • Mendota Heights, Minnesota	Midco Sports+	Trotter	L 2–3 ^{OT}	1,078	11–12–5 (8–8–4)
February 7	6:07 pm	at Bowling Green		Slater Family Ice Arena • Bowling Green, Ohio	Midco Sports+	Trotter	L 1–4	2,327	11–13–5 (8–9–4)
February 8	6:07 pm	at Bowling Green		Slater Family Ice Arena • Bowling Green, Ohio	Midco Sports+	Sibell	W 2–1	3,114	12–13–5 (9–9–4)
February 21	6:07 pm	at Northern Michigan		Berry Events Center • Marquette, Michigan	Midco Sports+	Sibell	W 3–0	2,221	13–13–5 (10–9–4)
February 22	5:07 pm	at Northern Michigan		Berry Events Center • Marquette, Michigan	Midco Sports+	Sibell	W 4–3	2,603	14–13–5 (11–9–4)
February 28	7:07 pm	Michigan Tech		St. Thomas Ice Arena • Mendota Heights, Minnesota	Midco Sports+	Sibell	W 4–3	968	15–13–5 (12–9–4)
March 1	6:07 pm	Michigan Tech		St. Thomas Ice Arena • Mendota Heights, Minnesota	Midco Sports+	Sibell	W 2–1	952	16–13–5 (13–9–4)
CCHA Tournament
March 7	7:00 pm	Ferris State*		St. Thomas Ice Arena • Mendota Heights, Minnesota (CCHA Quarterfinal Game 1)	Midco Sports+	Sibell	W 7–3	447	17–13–5
March 8	6:00 pm	Ferris State*		St. Thomas Ice Arena • Mendota Heights, Minnesota (CCHA Quarterfinal Game 2)	Midco Sports+	Sibell	W 4–1	462	18–13–5
March 15	4:07 pm	Bowling Green*		St. Thomas Ice Arena • Mendota Heights, Minnesota (CCHA Semifinal)	Midco Sports+	Sibell	W 3–1	575	19–13–5
March 21	7:07 pm	at #15 Minnesota State*		Mayo Clinic Health System Event Center • Mankato, Minnesota (CCHA Championship)	Midco Sports+	Sibell	L 2–4	4,538	19–14–5
*Non-conference game. ^{#}Rankings from USCHO.com Poll. All times are in Central Time. Source:

== Scoring statistics ==
Name	Position	Games	Goals	Assists	Points	PIM
Liam Malmquist	F	38	20	25	45	8
Lucas Wahlin	F	38	17	24	41	50
Cooper Gay	RW	35	19	11	30	14
Matthew Gleason	C	35	11	11	22	43
Chase Foley	D	37	3	19	22	18
Ryan O'Neill	F	38	6	15	21	20
Jake Braccini	RW	37	9	10	19	16
Caige Sterzer	F	38	6	8	14	33
Chase Cheslock	D	38	1	13	14	22
Casy Laylin	F	38	4	7	11	8
Mason Poolman	D	38	4	7	11	13
Ethan Gauer	D	38	2	9	11	26
Luc Laylin	F	38	4	6	10	18
Ethan Elias	D	29	0	5	5	2
Grant Docter	D	25	2	1	3	4
Alexander Tell	C	10	1	2	3	4
Cole Miller	D	31	1	2	3	10
Quinton Pepper	RW	34	1	1	2	4
Carson Peters	D	23	0	2	2	6
Ryder Donovan	C/RW	24	0	2	2	24
J. D. Metz	D/F	7	0	1	1	2
Aaron Trotter	G	20	0	1	1	0
Jase Sofo	D	2	0	0	0	4
Nicholas Mikan	RW	2	0	0	0	2
Jake Ratzlaff	D	9	0	0	0	11
Tobias Abrahamsson	D	18	0	0	0	17
Ray Christy	F	21	0	0	0	8
Jake Sibell	G	20	0	0	0	0
Bench	–	–	–	–	–	6
Total			111	182	293	395

== Goaltending statistics ==
Name	Games	Minutes	Wins	Losses	Ties	Goals against	Saves	Shut outs	SV %	GAA
Jake Sibell	20	1172:35	12	5	3	48	577	1	.923	2.46
Aaron Trotter	20	1119:03	7	9	2	49	489	1	.909	2.63
Empty Net	-	17:56	-	-	-	5	-	-	-	-
Total	38	2309:34	19	14	5	101	1066	2	.910	2.62

== Rankings ==
Poll	Week																											
Poll	Pre	1	2	3	4	5	6	7	8	9	10	11	12	13	14	15	16	17	18	19	20	21	22	23	24	25	26	27 (Final)
USCHO.com	RV	RV	NR	NR	NR	NR	NR	NR	NR	NR	NR	NR	–	NR	NR	NR	NR	NR	NR	NR	NR	NR	NR	NR	NR	NR	–	NR
USA Hockey	20	RV	NR	NR	NR	NR	NR	NR	NR	NR	NR	NR	–	NR	NR	NR	NR	NR	NR	NR	NR	NR	NR	NR	NR	NR	NR	NR

Note: USCHO did not release a poll in week 12 or 26.
Note: USA Hockey did not release a poll in week 12.

== Awards and honors ==
Player	Award	Ref
Liam Malmquist	All-CCHA First Team	
Lucas Wahlin	All-CCHA First Team	
Chase Foley	All-CCHA Second Team	
Liam Malmquist	CCHA Tournament Third Star	
