= Augustana University Vikings men's ice hockey statistical leaders =

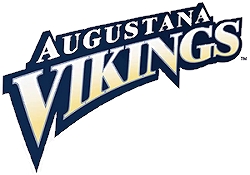

The Augustana Vikings men's ice hockey statistical leaders are individual statistical leaders of the Augustana (South Dakota) Vikings men's ice hockey program in various categories, including goals, assists, points, and saves. Within those areas, the lists identify single-game, single-season, and career leaders. The Vikings represent Augustana University in the Central Collegiate Hockey Association of the NCAA.

Augustana began competing in Division I intercollegiate ice hockey in 2023. These lists are updated through the end of the 2023–24 season.

== Goals ==
Career
| Rk | Player | Goals | Seasons |
|---|---|---|---|
| 1 | Luke Mobley | 25 | 2023–24 2024–25 |
| 2 | Brett Meerman | 23 | 2023–24 2024–25 2025–26 |
| 3 | Colton Friesen | 22 | 2023–24 2024–25 2025–26 |
| 4 | Hunter Bischoff | 21 | 2023–24 2024–25 2025–26 |
| 5 | Owen Bohn | 19 | 2023–24 2024–25 2025–26 |
| 6 | Leonid Bulgakov | 15 | 2025–26 |
| 7 | Joey DelGreco | 14 | 2024–25 2025–26 |
| 8 | Quinn Rudrud | 12 | 2023–24 2024–25 2025–26 |
| 9 | Hayden Hennen | 10 | 2023–24 2024–25 2025–26 |
| | Easton Young | 10 | 2024–25 2025–26 |

Season
| Rk | Player | Goals | Season |
|---|---|---|---|
| 1 | Leonid Bulgakov | 15 | 2025–26 |
| 2 | Luke Mobley | 13 | 2024–25 |
| | Brett Meerman | 13 | 2025–26 |
| 4 | Luke Mobley | 12 | 2023–24 |
| | Colton Friesen | 12 | 2025–26 |
| 6 | Hunter Bischoff | 10 | 2024–25 |
| 7 | Jacob Jastrzebski | 9 | 2025–26 |
| 8 | Arnaud Vachon | 8 | 2023–24 |
| | Ryan Naumovski | 8 | 2023–24 |
| | Payton Matsui | 8 | 2024–25 |

Single Game
| Rk | Player | Goals | Season | Opponent |
|---|---|---|---|---|
| 1 | Luke Mobley | 2 | 2023–24 | Lindenwood |
| | Chase Brand | 2 | 2023–24 | Arizona State |
| | Owen Bohn | 2 | 2024–25 | St. Cloud State |
| | Brett Meerman | 2 | 2024–25 | Bemidji State |
| | Nace Langus | 2 | 2024–25 | Alaska |
| | Luke Mobley | 2 | 2024–25 | Lake Superior |
| | Hunter Bischoff | 2 | 2024–25 | Michigan Tech |
| | Hunter Bischoff | 2 | 2024–25 | Bemidji State |
| | Hunter Bischoff | 2 | 2025–26 | Minnesota-Duluth |
| | Brett Meerman | 2 | 2025–26 | Minnesota State |
| | Brett Meerman | 2 | 2025–26 | Omaha |
| | Leonid Bulgakov | 2 | 2025–26 | Omaha |
| | Hayden Hennen | 2 | 2025–26 | Colorado College |
| | Easton Young | 2 | 2025–26 | Ferris State |
| | Leonid Bulgakov | 2 | 2025–26 | Lake Superior |
| | Owen Bohn | 2 | 2025–26 | Lake Superior |
| | Brett Meerman | 2 | 2025–26 | Michigan Tech |

== Assists ==
Career
| Rk | Player | Assists | Seasons |
|---|---|---|---|
| 1 | Brett Meerman | 41 | 2023–24 2024–25 2025–26 |
| 2 | Hayden Hennen | 34 | 2023–24 2024–25 2025–26 |
| 3 | Colton Friesen | 33 | 2023–24 2024–25 2025–26 |
| 4 | Hunter Bischoff | 26 | 2023–24 2024–25 2025–26 |
| 5 | Owen Baumgartner | 25 | 2024–25 2025–26 |
| 6 | Owen Bohn | 23 | 2023–24 2024–25 2025–26 |
| | Easton Young | 23 | 2024–25 2025–26 |
| 8 | Nace Langus | 21 | 2024–25 2025–26 |
| 9 | Joey DelGreco | 19 | 2024–25 2025–26 |
| 10 | Simon Falk | 18 | 2023–24 2024–25 |
| | Evan McIntyre | 18 | 2023–24 2024–25 |

Season
| Rk | Player | Assists | Season |
|---|---|---|---|
| 1 | Ryan Naumovski | 17 | 2023–24 |
| 2 | Brett Meerman | 16 | 2024–25 |
| | Owen Baumgartner | 16 | 2025–26 |
| 4 | Brett Meerman | 15 | 2025–26 |
| | Colton Friesen | 15 | 2025–26 |
| 6 | Cole Burtch | 14 | 2025–26 |
| 7 | Hunter Bischoff | 13 | 2024–25 |
| | Payton Matsui | 13 | 2024–25 |
| | Easton Young | 13 | 2025–26 |
| | Jacob Jastrzebski | 13 | 2025–26 |

Single Game
| Rk | Player | Assists | Season | Opponent |
|---|---|---|---|---|
| 1 | Easton Young | 3 | 2025–26 | Omaha |
| | Nace Langus | 3 | 2025–26 | Bowling Green |
| 3 | Simon Falk | 2 | 2023–24 | Denver |
| | Quinn Rudrud | 2 | 2023–24 | Colorado College |
| | Ben Troumbly | 2 | 2023–24 | Michigan Tech |
| | Ryan Naumovski | 2 | 2023–24 | Michigan Tech |
| | Simon Falk | 2 | 2023–24 | Lindenwood |
| | Ryan Naumovski | 2 | 2023–24 | Northern Michigan |
| | Hayden Hennen | 2 | 2023–24 | Northern Michigan |
| | Colton Friesen | 2 | 2023–24 | Northern Michigan |
| | Colton Friesen | 2 | 2023–24 | Alaska |
| | Evan McIntyre | 2 | 2023–24 | Alaska |
| | Arnaud Vachon | 2 | 2023–24 | Arizona State |
| | Brady Ziemer | 2 | 2023–24 | Arizona State |
| | Ryan Naumovski | 2 | 2023–24 | Ferris State |
| | Brett Meerman | 2 | 2023–24 | St. Thomas |
| | Shay Donovan | 2 | 2023–24 | St. Thomas |
| | Chase Brand | 2 | 2023–24 | Alaska-Anchorage |
| | Brett Meerman | 2 | 2024–25 | Long Island |
| | Tyler Hennen | 2 | 2024–25 | Long Island |
| | Payton Matsui | 2 | 2024–25 | Long Island |
| | Joey DelGreco | 2 | 2024–25 | Ferris State |
| | Colton Friesen | 2 | 2024–25 | Northern Michigan |
| | Uula Ruikka | 2 | 2024–25 | Alaska |
| | Hunter Bischoff | 2 | 2024–25 | Alasaka-Anchorage |
| | Owen Baumgartner | 2 | 2024–25 | Alasaka-Anchorage |
| | Will Svenddal | 2 | 2024–25 | Lake Superior |
| | Owen Baumgartner | 2 | 2024–25 | Lake Superior |
| | Nace Langus | 2 | 2024–25 | Lake Superior |
| | Tyler Hennen | 2 | 2024–25 | Lake Superior |
| | Nace Langus | 2 | 2024–25 | Michigan Tech |
| | Easton Young | 2 | 2024–25 | Michigan Tech |
| | Colton Friesen | 2 | 2024–25 | Bemidji State |
| | Brett Meerman | 2 | 2024–25 | Bemidji State |
| | Jacob Jastrzebski | 2 | 2025–26 | Minnesota-Duluth |
| | Hayden Hennen | 2 | 2025–26 | Arizona State |
| | Carter Theissen | 2 | 2025–26 | Arizona State |
| | Tyler Hennen | 2 | 2025–26 | Arizona State |
| | Cole Burtch | 2 | 2025–26 | Bemidji State |
| | Owen Baumgartner | 2 | 2025–26 | Northern Michigan |
| | Brett Meerman | 2 | 2025–26 | St. Thomas |
| | Jacob Jastrzebski | 2 | 2025–26 | Minnesota State |
| | Brett Meerman | 2 | 2025–26 | Minnesota State |
| | Cole Burtch | 2 | 2025–26 | Omaha |
| | Owen Baumgartner | 2 | 2025–26 | Omaha |
| | Joey DelGreco | 2 | 2025–26 | Colorado College |
| | Easton Young | 2 | 2025–26 | Colorado College |
| | Cole Burtch | 2 | 2025–26 | Ferris State |
| | Nace Langus | 2 | 2025–26 | Ferris State |
| | Owen Baumgartner | 2 | 2025–26 | Ferris State |
| | Colton Friesen | 2 | 2025–26 | Lake Superior |
| | Jacob Jastrzebski | 2 | 2025–26 | Lake Superior |
| | Joey DelGreco | 2 | 2025–26 | St. Thomas |
| | Easton Young | 2 | 2025–26 | St. Thomas |
| | Colton Friesen | 2 | 2025–26 | Bemidji State |

== Points ==
Career
| Rk | Player | Points | Seasons |
|---|---|---|---|
| 1 | Brett Meerman | 64 | 2023–24 2024–25 2025–26 |
| 2 | Colton Friesen | 55 | 2023–24 2024–25 2025–26 |
| 3 | Hunter Bischoff | 47 | 2023–24 2024–25 2025–26 |
| 4 | Hayden Hennen | 44 | 2023–24 2024–25 2025–26 |
| 5 | Owen Bohn | 42 | 2023–24 2024–25 2025–26 |
| 6 | Luke Mobley | 39 | 2023–24 2024–25 |
| 7 | Joey DelGreco | 33 | 2024–25 2025–26 |
| | Easton Young | 33 | 2024–25 2025–26 |
| 9 | Owen Baumgartner | 32 | 2024–25 2025–26 |
| 10 | Nace Langus | 30 | 2024–25 2025–26 |

Season
| Rk | Player | Points | Season |
|---|---|---|---|
| 1 | Brett Meerman | 28 | 2025–26 |
| 2 | Colton Friesen | 27 | 2025–26 |
| 3 | Ryan Naumovski | 25 | 2023–24 |
| 4 | Hunter Bischoff | 23 | 2024–25 |
| | Brett Meerman | 23 | 2024–25 |
| | Leonid Bulgakov | 23 | 2025–26 |
| 7 | Jacob Jastrzebski | 22 | 2025–26 |
| 8 | Payton Matsui | 21 | 2024–25 |
| | Owen Baumgartner | 21 | 2025–26 |
| 10 | Luke Mobley | 20 | 2024–25 |
| | Easton Young | 20 | 2025–26 |

Single Game
| Rk | Player | Points | Season | Opponent |
|---|---|---|---|---|
| 1 | Ryan Naumovski | 3 | 2023–24 | Northern Michigan |
| | Arnaud Vachon | 3 | 2023–24 | Arizona State |
| | Brett Meerman | 3 | 2024–25 | Bemidgji State |
| | Brett Meerman | 3 | 2025–26 | Omaha |
| | Easton Young | 3 | 2025–26 | Omaha |
| | Owen Baumgartner | 3 | 2025–26 | Omaha |
| | Nace Langus | 3 | 2025–26 | Bowling Green |
| | Colton Friesen | 3 | 2025–26 | Bemidji State |

== Saves ==
Career
| Rk | Player | Saves | Seasons |
|---|---|---|---|
| 1 | Josh Kotai | 2277 | 2023–24 2024–25 2025–26 |
| 2 | Zachary Rose | 463 | 2023–24 |
| 3 | Kayden Hargraves | 241 | 2023–24 |
| 4 | Christian Manz | 178 | 2024–25 2025–26 |

Season
| Rk | Player | Saves | Season |
|---|---|---|---|
| 1 | Josh Kotai | 1056 | 2025–26 |
| 2 | Josh Kotai | 843 | 2024–25 |
| 3 | Zachary Rose | 463 | 2023–24 |
| 4 | Josh Kotai | 378 | 2023–24 |
| 5 | Kayden Hargraves | 241 | 2023–24 |
| 6 | Christian Manz | 118 | 2024–25 |
| 7 | Christian Manz | 60 | 2025–26 |

Single Game
| Rk | Player | Saves | Season | Opponent |
|---|---|---|---|---|
| 1 | Josh Kotai | 45 | 2024–25 | Colorado College |
| 2 | Zachary Rose | 44 | 2023–24 | Minnesota State |
| 3 | Zachary Rose | 43 | 2023–24 | Bowling Green |
| 4 | Josh Kotai | 42 | 2025–26 | Bowling Green |
| | Josh Kotai | 42 | 2025–26 | Bemidji State |
| 6 | Zachary Rose | 41 | 2023–24 | Wisconsin |
| | Josh Kotai | 41 | 2023–24 | Wisconsin |
| | Josh Kotai | 41 | 2023–24 | Northern Michigan |
| | Josh Kotai | 41 | 2024–25 | Bowling Green |
| | Josh Kotai | 41 | 2025–26 | Northern Michigan |
| | Josh Kotai | 41 | 2025–26 | Lake Superior |
