= 2024–25 Augustana (South Dakota) Vikings men's ice hockey season =

2024–25 Augustana Vikings men's ice hockey season
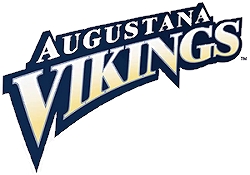
- Conference: 2nd CCHA
- Home ice: Midco Arena

Rankings
- USCHO: NR
- USA Hockey: NR

Record
- Overall: 18–13–4
- Conference: 9–5–2
- Home: 9–6–2
- Road: 9–7–2

Coaches and captains
- Head coach: Garrett Raboin
- Assistant coaches: Taylor Nelson; Chad Demers
- Captain: Luke Mobley
- Alternate captain(s): Payton Matsui; Evan McIntyre; Brady Ziemer

The 2024–25 Augustana (South Dakota) Vikings men's ice hockey season was the second season of play for the program and 2nd in the CCHA. The Vikings represented Augustana University, played their home games at Midco Arena and were coached by Garrett Raboin in his second season.

== Season ==
In the off-season, the CCHA announced that the timeline for Augustana was being moved up. Rather than become a full conference member in 2025–26, the Vikings would be eligible for the conference tournament in 2024–25. As schedules had already been set before the announcement, the CCHA would use point percentage to determine Augustana's place in the standings. With that decided, Augustana entered its second season of varsity ice hockey.

From the very beginning, the Vikings were exceeding expectations. Picked to finish 6th in the preseason poll, the team got a sizable boost from the vastly improved play of Josh Kotai. The Sophomore netminder recorded his first two career shutouts in the first two weeks of the season. At the same time, the team also earned its first ever weekend sweep of a ranked team when they shut down Omaha and climbed into the top 10 of the PairWise rankings, albeit temporarily. After a bit of a lull to end the month, Augustana's defense settled down and the team was able to post a winning record in the first half of the season.

At the beginning of January, the Vikings earned another surprising sweep when they took down Colorado College. The two wins over a top-10 opponent lifted the team up into the top 20 of the PairWise rankings and gave the club an outside chance to earn its way into the NCAA tournament. While Augustana didn't lose over the next three weeks, their weak opponents caused the Vikings' ranking to slip. However, when the team was set to face Minnesota State for a battle of conference supremacy, they had not only climbed back into the top 20 but they were also appearing in the national polls themselves. The series against the Mavericks could have propelled Augustana towards an at-large bid, however, the Vikings were unable to get their offense on track and scored just one goal in each match (both losses). Due primarily to their weak schedule, the team had very little chance for an appearance on merit afterwards. What little chance they had evaporated in the final weekend of the year when they were swept by Alaska and dropped into the bottom half of the PairWise.

With their last remaining chance at the postseason being a conference championship, Augustana was at least able to rely on their 2nd-place finish to get favorable seeding in the quarterfinals. The Vikings opened with a comfortable win over Bemidji State but the Beavers fought back to capture the second game. The deciding match saw both teams take a 1-goal lead, however, by the end of regulation the score remained tied and Augustana found itself it the program's first elimination game. It didn't take long as just over 4 minutes into overtime, Kotai was beat by a quick shot from the wall and the Vikings' season was suddenly over.

== Departures ==
Player	Position	Nationality	Cause
Chase Brand	Forward	United States	Graduation (signed with Reading Royals)
Shay Donovan	Forward	United States	Graduation (retired)
Jack Jensen	Forward	United States	Signed professional contract (Idaho Steelheads)
Ryan Naumovski	Forward	United States	Graduation (signed with Kalamazoo Wings)
Ethan Perrault	Defenseman	United States	Transferred to Buffalo State
Zack Rose	Goaltender	Canada	Graduation (retired)
Anthony Stark	Defenseman	United States	Graduation (retired)
Arnaud Vachon	Forward	Canada	Graduation (signed with Greenville Swamp Rabbits)

== Recruiting ==
Player	Position	Nationality	Age	Notes
Owen Baumgartner	Defenseman	United States	22	Owatonna, MN; transfer from Air Force
Joey DelGreco	Forward	United States	20	Grand Rapids, MN
Garett Drotts	Forward	United States	20	Grand Rapids, MN
Tyler Hennen	Forward	United States	20	Hallock, MN
Nace Langus	Forward	Slovenia	19	Jesenice, SLO
Christian Manz	Goaltender	United States	20	Blaine, MN
Payton Matsui	Forward	United States	24	Lakeville, MN; transfer from Alaska
Carter Theissen	Defenseman	United States	21	Plymouth, MN
Easton Young	Defenseman	United States	21	Grand Rapids, MN

== Roster ==
As of July 30, 2024.

No.	Nat.	Player	Class	Pos	Height	Weight	DoB	Hometown	Previous team	NHL rights
1	(United States)	Christian Manz	Freshman	G	6' 0" (1.83 m)	181 lb (82 kg)	2004-01-13	Blaine, Minnesota	Sioux Falls Stampede (USHL)	—
4	(United States)	Carter Theissen	Freshman	D	5' 11" (1.8 m)	181 lb (82 kg)	2003-07-10	Plymouth, Minnesota	Wisconsin Windigo (NAHL)	—
5	(United States)	Easton Young	Freshman	D	5' 11" (1.8 m)	185 lb (84 kg)	2003-07-25	Grand Rapids, Michigan	Johnstown Tomahawks (NAHL)	—
7	(Canada)	Evan McIntyre (A)	Senior	D	5' 10" (1.78 m)	174 lb (79 kg)	2000-10-17	Oakville, Ontario	Ohio State (Big Ten)	—
8	(United States)	Ben Troumbly	Junior	F	5' 7" (1.7 m)	160 lb (73 kg)	2001-11-21	Bovey, Minnesota	Bismarck Bobcats (NAHL)	—
9	(United States)	Hayden Hennen	Sophomore	D	6' 4" (1.93 m)	175 lb (79 kg)	2002-08-13	Hallock, Minnesota	Anchorage Wolverines (NAHL)	—
10	(United States)	Joey DelGreco	Freshman	F	6' 2" (1.88 m)	210 lb (95 kg)	2003-11-25	Plymouth, Minnesota	Chicago Steel (USHL)	—
11	(United States)	Tyler Hennen	Freshman	F	5' 11" (1.8 m)	150 lb (68 kg)	2004-08-31	Hallock, Minnesota	Anchorage Wolverines (NAHL)	—
12	(United States)	Hunter Bischoff	Sophomore	F	6' 1" (1.85 m)	182 lb (83 kg)	2003-03-24	Cohasset, Minnesota	Youngstown Phantoms (USHL)	—
13	(United States)	Will Howard	Sophomore	F	6' 2" (1.88 m)	195 lb (88 kg)	2002-07-30	Grand Forks, North Dakota	New Mexico Ice Wolves (NAHL)	—
14	(United States)	Payton Matsui (A)	Senior	F	5' 7" (1.7 m)	160 lb (73 kg)	2000-04-15	Lakeville, Minnesota	Alaska (NCAA)	—
15	(United States)	Luke Mobley (C)	Senior	F	6' 3" (1.91 m)	215 lb (98 kg)	1999-11-25	St. Louis Park, Minnesota	Clarkson (ECAC)	—
19	(United States)	Will Svenddal	Junior	D	6' 1" (1.85 m)	195 lb (88 kg)	2001-10-12	Minneapolis, Minnesota	Minnesota Magicians (NAHL)	—
20	(Finland)	Uula Ruikka	Senior	D	5' 9" (1.75 m)	168 lb (76 kg)	2000-05-28	Oulu, Finland	Providence (HEA)	—
21	(United States)	Quinn Rudrud	Junior	F	6' 3" (1.91 m)	185 lb (84 kg)	2001-08-18	Farmington, Minnesota	Alaska (NCAA)	—
22	(United States)	Brady Ziemer (A)	Senior	D	5' 10" (1.78 m)	180 lb (82 kg)	2000-05-24	Carver, Minnesota	St. Cloud State (NCHC)	—
23	(Sweden)	Simon Falk	Senior	F	6' 3" (1.91 m)	200 lb (91 kg)	2000-01-20	Västerås, Sweden	Alaska (NCAA)	—
24	(Canada)	Colton Friesen	Junior	F	5' 10" (1.78 m)	170 lb (77 kg)	2001-12-09	Winnipeg, Manitoba	Wisconsin–Superior (WIAC)	—
26	(Canada)	Callum Gau	Sophomore	F	6' 2" (1.88 m)	180 lb (82 kg)	2002-06-19	Camrose, Alberta	Camrose Kodiaks (AJHL)	—
27	(United States)	Garett Drotts	Freshman	F	6' 0" (1.83 m)	174 lb (79 kg)	2003-11-21	Grand Rapids, Michigan	Des Moines Buccaneers (USHL)	—
29	(United States)	Kayden Hargraves	Sophomore	G	6' 1" (1.85 m)	175 lb (79 kg)	2002-02-25	Cheyenne, Wyoming	Fairbanks Ice Dogs (NAHL)	—
32	(Canada)	Josh Kotai	Sophomore	G	6' 2" (1.88 m)	175 lb (79 kg)	2003-03-13	Abbotsford, British Columbia	Battlefords North Stars (SJHL)	—
72	(Canada)	Brett Meerman	Sophomore	F	5' 9" (1.75 m)	177 lb (80 kg)	2002-02-04	Blackfalds, Alberta	Blackfalds Bulldogs (AJHL)	—
81	(United States)	Owen Bohn	Sophomore	F	5' 11" (1.8 m)	165 lb (75 kg)	2002-02-12	Morgan Hill, California	Victoria Grizzlies (BCHL)	—
84	(United States)	Jeff Hutchinson	Sophomore	D	6' 2" (1.88 m)	200 lb (91 kg)	2002-05-02	St. Louis, Missouri	New Mexico Ice Wolves (NAHL)	—
86	(Slovenia)	Nace Langus	Freshman	F	6' 1" (1.85 m)	190 lb (86 kg)	2004-12-05	Jesenice, Slovenia	IK Oskarshamn J20 (J20 Nationell)	—
96	(United States)	Owen Baumgartner	Sophomore	D	5' 10" (1.78 m)	185 lb (84 kg)	2002-07-01	Owatonna, Minnesota	Air Force (NAHL)	—

== Standings ==
2024–25 Central Collegiate Hockey Association standings
	Conference record											Overall record					
	GP	W	L	T	OTW	OTL	SW	PTS	PCT ^	GF	GA	GP	W	L	T	GF	GA
#14 Minnesota State †*	26	18	5	3	3	1	1	56	.718	77	37	39	27	9	3	113	58
Augustana	16	9	5	2	1	1	1	30	.625	48	37	35	18	13	4	97	75
St. Thomas	26	13	9	4	1	1	1	42	.564	76	66	38	19	14	5	111	101
Bowling Green	26	12	10	4	2	3	2	43	.551	69	63	36	18	14	4	90	85
Michigan Tech	26	12	11	3	1	1	1	40	.513	75	69	36	16	17	3	95	96
Ferris State	26	12	13	1	1	0	0	36	.462	74	81	36	13	20	3	89	128
Bemidji State	26	10	12	4	3	1	4	36	.462	63	78	38	15	18	5	93	114
Lake Superior State	26	10	15	1	0	4	0	35	.449	71	76	36	12	22	2	93	115
Northern Michigan	26	4	20	2	1	1	2	16	.205	42	88	34	5	27	2	55	115
Championship: March 21, 2025 † indicates conference regular-season champion (MacNaughton Cup) * indicates conference tournament champion (Mason Cup)^ Because Augustana played a transition schedule of 16 games against conference opponents, winning percentage was used to determine conference position. Rankings: USCHO.com Top 20 Poll

== Schedule and results ==
Date	Time	Opponent^{#}	Rank^{#}	Site	TV	Decision	Result	Attendance	Record
Exhibition
October 5	6:07 pm	at #5 North Dakota*		Ralph Engelstad Arena • Grand Forks, North Dakota (Exhibition)	Midco Sports	Manz	W 4–1	11,667	
Regular Season
October 11	7:07 pm	Long Island*		Midco Arena • Sioux Falls, South Dakota	Midco Sports+	Kotai	W 4–0	2,703	1–0–0
October 12	6:07 pm	Long Island*		Midco Arena • Sioux Falls, South Dakota	Midco Sports+	Kotai	L 2–3	2,719	1–1–0
October 18	7:07 pm	at #12 Omaha*		Baxter Arena • Omaha, Nebraska		Kotai	W 2–1	6,238	2–1–0
October 19	7:07 pm	at #12 Omaha*		Baxter Arena • Omaha, Nebraska		Kotai	W 4–0	6,253	3–1–0
October 25	7:00 pm	at #12 St. Cloud State*		Herb Brooks National Hockey Center • St. Cloud, Minnesota	Fox 9+	Kotai	L 3–4	3,067	3–2–0
October 26	5:00 pm	at #12 St. Cloud State*		Herb Brooks National Hockey Center • St. Cloud, Minnesota		Manz	L 1–2	4,163	3–3–0
November 1	7:07 pm	at St. Thomas		St. Thomas Ice Arena • Mendota Heights, Minnesota	Midco Sports+	Kotai	L 0–4	826	3–4–0 (0–1–0)
November 2	6:07 pm	at St. Thomas		St. Thomas Ice Arena • Mendota Heights, Minnesota	Midco Sports+	Kotai	W 3–2	906	4–4–0 (1–1–0)
November 8	7:07 pm	Bemidji State		Midco Arena • Sioux Falls, South Dakota	Midco Sports+	Kotai	L 3–4 ^{OT}	2,798	4–5–0 (1–2–0)
November 9	6:07 pm	Bemidji State		Midco Arena • Sioux Falls, South Dakota	Midco Sports+	Kotai	W 5–1	2,997	5–5–0 (2–2–0)
November 15	6:00 pm	at USNTDP*		USA Hockey Arena • Plymouth, Michigan (Exhibition)		Kotai	W 4–1	1,743	
November 16	6:00 pm	at USNTDP*		USA Hockey Arena • Plymouth, Michigan (Exhibition)		Manz	W 3–2	1,933	
November 22	6:07 pm	at Ferris State		Ewigleben Arena • Big Rapids, Michigan	Midco Sports+	Manz	L 2–5	1,121	5–6–0 (2–3–0)
November 23	5:07 pm	at Ferris State		Ewigleben Arena • Big Rapids, Michigan	Midco Sports+	Kotai	W 4–1	1,031	6–6–0 (3–3–0)
November 29	7:07 pm	Northern Michigan		Midco Arena • Sioux Falls, South Dakota	Midco Sports+	Kotai	W 4–1	2,377	7–6–0 (4–3–0)
November 30	6:07 pm	Northern Michigan		Midco Arena • Sioux Falls, South Dakota	Midco Sports+	Kotai	W 4–1	2,525	8–6–0 (5–3–0)
December 6	10:07 pm	at Alaska*		Carlson Center • Fairbanks, Alaska	FloHockey	Kotai	W 3–1	3,005	9–6–0
December 7	9:07 pm	at Alaska*		Carlson Center • Fairbanks, Alaska	FloHockey	Kotai	L 1–2	3,117	9–7–0
December 12	10:07 pm	at Alaska Anchorage*		Avis Alaska Sports Complex • Anchorage, Alaska		Kotai	T 2–2 ^{OT}	507	9–7–1
December 13	10:07 pm	at Alaska Anchorage*		Avis Alaska Sports Complex • Anchorage, Alaska		Manz	W 3–2 ^{OT}	613	10–7–1
January 3	8:00 pm	at #8 Colorado College*		Ed Robson Arena • Colorado Springs, Colorado		Kotai	W 5–1	3,417	11–7–1
January 4	5:00 pm	at #8 Colorado College*		Ed Robson Arena • Colorado Springs, Colorado		Kotai	W 3–2	3,493	12–7–1
January 17	7:07 pm	Lindenwood*		Midco Arena • Sioux Falls, South Dakota	Midco Sports+	Kotai	W 3–2	2,845	13–7–1
January 18	6:07 pm	Lindenwood*		Midco Arena • Sioux Falls, South Dakota	Midco Sports+	Kotai	T 1–1 ^{OT}	2,932	13–7–2
January 24	6:07 pm	at Bowling Green		Slater Family Ice Arena • Bowling Green, Ohio	Midco Sports+	Kotai	W 1–0 ^{OT}	2,171	14–7–2 (6–3–0)
January 25	5:07 pm	at Bowling Green		Slater Family Ice Arena • Bowling Green, Ohio	Midco Sports+	Kotai	T 1–1 ^{SOW}	3,132	14–7–3 (6–3–1)
January 31	7:07 pm	Lake Superior State	#19	Midco Arena • Sioux Falls, South Dakota	Midco Sports+	Kotai	W 6–3	2,866	15–7–3 (7–3–1)
February 1	6:07 pm	Lake Superior State	#19	Midco Arena • Sioux Falls, South Dakota	Midco Sports+	Kotai	W 4–3	3,006	16–7–3 (8–3–1)
February 7	7:07 pm	at #15 Minnesota State	#17	Mayo Clinic Health System Event Center • Mankato, Minnesota	Midco Sports+	Kotai	L 1–4	4,162	16–8–3 (8–4–1)
February 8	6:07 pm	at #15 Minnesota State	#17	Mayo Clinic Health System Event Center • Mankato, Minnesota	Midco Sports+	Kotai	L 1–2	4,717	16–9–3 (8–5–1)
February 14	7:07 pm	Michigan Tech		Midco Arena • Sioux Falls, South Dakota	Midco Sports+	Kotai	W 5–1	2,622	17–9–3 (9–5–1)
February 15	6:07 pm	Michigan Tech		Midco Arena • Sioux Falls, South Dakota	Midco Sports+	Manz	T 4–4 ^{SOL}	3,094	17–9–4 (9–5–2)
February 21	7:07 pm	Alaska*		Midco Arena • Sioux Falls, South Dakota	Midco Sports+	Kotai	L 1–2	2,970	17–10–4
February 22	6:07 pm	Alaska*		Midco Arena • Sioux Falls, South Dakota	Midco Sports+	Manz	L 3–5	3,106	17–11–4
CCHA Tournament
March 7	7:07 pm	Bemidji State*		Midco Arena • Sioux Falls, South Dakota (CCHA Quarterfinal Game 1)	Midco Sports+	Kotai	W 3–1	3,116	18–11–4
March 8	6:07 pm	Bemidji State*		Midco Arena • Sioux Falls, South Dakota (CCHA Quarterfinal Game 2)	Midco Sports+	Kotai	L 3–4	3,085	18–12–4
March 9	5:07 pm	Bemidji State*		Midco Arena • Sioux Falls, South Dakota (CCHA Quarterfinal Game 3)	Midco Sports+	Kotai	L 2–3 ^{OT}	2,895	18–13–4
*Non-conference game. ^{#}Rankings from USCHO.com Poll. All times are in Central Time. Source:

== Scoring statistics ==
Name	Position	Games	Goals	Assists	Points	PIM
Hunter Bischoff	F	35	10	13	23	14
Brett Meerman	F	35	7	16	23	2
Payton Matsui	F	34	8	13	21	2
Luke Mobley	F	34	13	7	20	14
Colton Friesen	F	32	7	10	17	6
Nace Langus	C	29	6	10	16	8
Simon Falk	RW	32	5	11	16	2
Joey DelGreco	F	35	7	8	15	20
Hayden Hennen	D	34	3	12	15	29
Tyler Hennen	F	28	6	7	13	21
Easton Young	D	33	3	10	13	25
Owen Bohn	F	23	6	6	12	8
Owen Baumgartner	D	21	2	9	11	21
Evan McIntyre	D	35	1	10	11	24
Quinn Rudrud	F	32	6	3	9	27
Uula Ruikka	D	24	2	6	8	12
Will Svenddal	D	33	1	7	8	8
Garett Drotts	LW	20	1	6	7	8
Brady Ziemer	D	35	0	4	4	16
William Howard	F	18	1	2	3	6
Ben Troumbly	F	12	1	1	2	2
Callum Gau	F	23	1	1	2	17
Josh Kotai	G	31	0	1	1	2
Carter Theissen	D	6	0	0	0	0
Jeff Hutchinson	D	22	0	0	0	6
Christian Manz	G	5	0	0	0	0
Bench	–	–	–	–	–	6
Total			97	173	270	306

== Goaltending statistics ==
Name	Games	Minutes	Wins	Losses	Ties	Goals against	Saves	Shut outs	SV %	GAA
Josh Kotai	31	1808:58	17	10	3	58	843	3	.936	1.92
Christian Manz	6	295:34	1	3	1	14	118	0	.894	2.84
Empty Net	-	24:45	-	-	-	3	-	-	-	-
Total	35	2129:17	18	13	4	75	961	3	.928	2.11

== Rankings ==
Poll	Week																											
Poll	Pre	1	2	3	4	5	6	7	8	9	10	11	12	13	14	15	16	17	18	19	20	21	22	23	24	25	26	27 (Final)
USCHO.com	NR	NR	NR	NR	NR	NR	NR	NR	NR	NR	NR	NR	-	NR	NR	NR	RV	19	17	RV	RV	RV	NR	NR	NR	NR	-	NR
USA Hockey	NR	NR	NR	NR	NR	NR	NR	NR	NR	NR	NR	NR	-	NR	NR	NR	RV	RV	17	RV	20	NR	NR	NR	NR	NR	NR	NR

Note: USCHO did not release a poll in week 12 or 26.
Note: USA Hockey did not release a poll in week 12.

== Awards and honors ==
Player	Award	Ref
Josh Kotai	CCHA Second Team	
Luke Mobley	CCHA Second Team	
