= Coachella Valley Cactus Cup =

College ice hockey tournament

Tournament information
- Sport: College ice hockey
- Location: Thousand Palms, California
- Format: Single-elimination
- Venue: Acrisure Arena
- Teams: 4

The Coachella Valley Cactus Cup is a mid-season college ice hockey tournament. The first iteration was played in early January 2025.

== History ==
Shortly after the conclusion of the 2023–24 college season, the home venue of the Coachella Valley Firebirds announced that it would be hosting a mid-season tournament the following January. The tournament continues the trend of college hockey's expansion into the Southwestern United States. Michigan Tech's head coach, Joe Shawhan, praised the series as an opportunity to expand the fanbase of his school, who already possessed a foothold in the region.

== Yearly Results ==
Year	Champion	Runner-up	Third place	Fourth place	MVP	Ref
2025	UMass Lowell	Omaha	Michigan Tech	Holy Cross	Lee Parks (UMass Lowell)	
2026	St. Cloud State	UMass Lowell	Minnesota State	Yale	Austin Burnevik (St. Cloud State)	
