= Taylor Nelson =

Canadian ice hockey player (born 1988)

- Born: May 3, 1988 (age 38) Regina, Saskatchewan, Canada
- Height: 6 ft 1 in (185 cm)
- Weight: 176 lb (80 kg; 12 st 8 lb)
- Position: Goaltender
- Caught: Left
- Played for: San Francisco Bulls; Wichita Thunder
- NHL draft: Undrafted
- Playing career: 2012–2014
- Coaching career

Current position
- Title: Assistant coach
- Team: Augustana
- Conference: CCHA

Biographical details
- Education: Ferris State University

Coaching career (HC unless noted)
- 2014–2015: Ferris State (assistant)
- 2015–2017: Tri-City Storm (assistant)
- 2017–2021: Canisius (assistant)
- 2021–2023: UMass–Lowell (assistant)
- 2023–Present: Augustana (assistant)

Taylor Nelson (born May 3, 1988) is a Canadian former professional ice hockey goaltender. He most recently played for the Wichita Thunder in the then CHL.

Nelson came to Ferris State University after he first played junior hockey in the Saskatchewan Junior Hockey League with the Humboldt Broncos before committing to Ferris State University of the NCAA's Division I in the Central Collegiate Hockey Association (CCHA) conference.

Undrafted, Nelson was signed to his first professional contract with the Worcester Sharks of the American Hockey League on August 29, 2012. After attending Worcester's training camp for the 2012–13 season, Nelson was reassigned to ECHL affiliate, the San Francisco Bulls to begin the year.

== Awards and honours ==
Award	Year
All-CCHA First Team	2011–12
NCAA West First All-American Team	2011–12
AHCA West First-Team All-American	2011–12
