= Joe Shawhan =

American ice hockey player and coach

Current position
- Title: Head coach

Biographical details
- Born: January 28, 1963 (age 63); Sault Ste. Marie, Michigan, US
- Education: Lake Superior State University

Playing career
- 1982–1987: Lake Superior State
- Position: Goaltender

Coaching career (HC unless noted)
- 1988–1995: Lake Superior State (Volunteer Assistant)
- 1995–2005: Soo Indians (HC/GM)
- 2005–2008: Lake Superior State (Assistant)
- 2008–2014: Northern Michigan (Assistant)
- 2014–2017: Michigan Tech (Assistant)
- 2017–2025: Michigan Tech

Head coaching record
- Overall: 154–120–29 (.556) [College] 474–162–43 (.730) [NAHL]
- Tournaments: 0–4 (.000)

Accomplishments and honors

Awards
- CCHA Coach of the Year (2023)

Joseph R. Shawhan (born January 28, 1963) is an American ice hockey head coach who most recently served as head coach at Michigan Tech.

== Career ==
Shawhan began his time at Lake Superior State in 1982. After sitting out the 1984–85 season he returned in force, finishing second in the nation with a 3.03 goals against average. During his time with the Lakers the program went from 11th in the conference to a perennial power and won the national title the year after he finished school. Shawhan stuck around his hometown of Sault Ste. Marie, Michigan for several more years, working as a volunteer assistant for the Lakers until he accepted the head coaching job for the expansion Soo Indians (also located in Sault Ste. Marie). The Indians lasted only ten seasons with Shawhan serving as the general manager and head coach for the entire time, but during their brief existence they left a lasting impression. Shawhan compiled a record of 474–162–43, becoming the winningest coach in the history of the NAHL. He won the coach of the year three times (1996, 2000 and 2001) while his team won three league titles.

After the Soo Indians suspended operations in 2005 Shawhan returned to college, rejoining Lake Superior State as a full-time assistant staying with the Lakers for another three years before accepting his first position outside of Sault Ste. Marie. He still didn't have to the leave the Upper Peninsula, moving down the road a short way to Marquette and becoming first a volunteer assistant for Northern Michigan and transitioned into director of hockey operations before assuming a full-time assistant coaching position. In 2014 he was named an assistant coach at Michigan Tech under Mel Pearson. Shawhan worked specifically with the goaltenders and defenseman and the team saw immediate results, recording three consecutive 20+ win seasons (their first since 1988) and made the NCAA tournament for the first time since 1981. On May 30, 2017, he was promoted to head coach at Michigan Tech. On May 22, 2025, Bill Muckalt was named as the head coach of Michigan Tech, ending Shawhan's tenure as head coach. He finished his career at Michigan Tech with a 154–120–29 record in eight seasons.

== Head coaching record ==
Record table
Season	Team	Overall	Conference	Standing	Postseason
Michigan Tech Huskies (WCHA) (2018–2021)
2017–18	Michigan Tech	22–17–5	12–11–5–2	5th	NCAA East Regional semifinals
2018–19	Michigan Tech	14–20–4	13–12–3–1	6th	WCHA quarterfinals
2019–20	Michigan Tech	21–15–3	14–12–2–0	6th	Tournament cancelled
2020–21	Michigan Tech	17–12–1	7–7–0	T–5th	WCHA quarterfinals
Michigan Tech:		74–64–13	46–42–9		
Michigan Tech Huskies (CCHA) (2021–2025)
2021–22	Michigan Tech	21–13–3	16–8–2	2nd	NCAA West Regional semifinals
2022–23	Michigan Tech	24–11–4	15–7–4	2nd	NCAA Midwest Regional semifinals
2023–24	Michigan Tech	19–15–6	12–10–2	T–2nd	NCAA East Regional semifinals
2024–25	Michigan Tech	16–17–3	12–11–3	5th	CCHA quarterfinals
Michigan Tech:		80–56–16	55–36–11		
Total:		154–120–29			
National champion Postseason invitational champion Conference regular season champion Conference regular season and conference tournament champion Division regular season champion Division regular season and conference tournament champion Conference tournament champion

Awards and achievements
Preceded by Mike Hastings	CCHA Coach of the Year; 2022–23	Succeeded by Tom Serratore
