= Garrett Raboin =

American ice hockey player and coach

Current position
- Title: Head coach
- Team: Augustana Vikings

Biographical details
- Born: March 27, 1985 (age 41); Detroit Lakes, Minnesota, U.S.
- Education: St. Cloud State

Playing career
- 2002–2003: Detroit Lakes
- 2004–2007: Lincoln Stars
- 2006–2010: St. Cloud State Huskies
- 2010–2011: TPS
- 2011: Lørenskog IK
- Position: Defense

Coaching career (HC unless noted)
- 2012–2018: St. Cloud State (Assistant)
- 2018–2022: Minnesota (Assistant)
- 2022–present: Augustana

Head coaching record
- Overall: 30–31–8 (.493)

Garrett Raboin (born March 27, 1985) is the head coach of Augustana University men's ice hockey team in Sioux Falls, South Dakota. He is a retired American professional ice hockey player who most recently played in the Norwegian GET-ligaen for Lørenskog IK in Lørenskog, an eastern suburb of Oslo. Prior to joining the Lørenskog team in the fall of 2011, he played in Turku, Finland for TPS of the SM-liiga.

Raboin played collegiate hockey at St. Cloud State University in Minnesota and later was an assistant coach with the team. Raboin was team Assistant Captain his sophomore year and Captain during his junior and senior year. Prior to attending St. Cloud State, he played for the Lincoln Stars of the United States Hockey League.

== Playing career ==
=== Lincoln Stars ===
In 2003, Garrett Raboin began his career playing for the Lincoln Stars. He helped the stars by scoring 12 goals, and by having 43 assists in his 3 seasons with the Stars.

He helped the Stars make it to the USHL Post Season in the 2004-05 Season along with the 2005-06 season.

=== St. Cloud State Huskies ===
In 2006, Garrett Raboin started to attend St. Cloud State University in St. Cloud, Minnesota. While there he played college hockey and scored 21 times, assisted 46 times.

He was an alternate captain in the 2007-08 season and Captain in the 2008–09 and 2009-10 seasons.

=== TPS ===
After graduating from St. Cloud State, Raboin went to play hockey for TPS in the Liiga League. While there he scored 6 goals and had 6 assists.

=== Lørenskog IK ===
In 2011, he went to Lørenskog where he had 14 goals and 6 assists and helped them make the playoffs.

== Coaching career ==
=== St. Cloud State Huskies ===
During the 2012-13 season, he became an assistant coach at St. Cloud State under then head coach Bob Motzko. He helped the team make it to the NCAA Hockey Tournament in 2012-13, 2013–14, 2014–15, 2015–16, 2017-18 seasons. He also helped the team get 1st place in the NCHC Hockey tournament in the 2015-2016 season along with a 1st place WCHA conference finish in the 2012-13 season. He also helped them win the NCHC regular season in 2013-14, and 2017-18 seasons.

=== Head coaching record ===
Record table
Season	Team	Overall	Conference	Standing	Postseason
Augustana Vikings (CCHA) (2023–present)
2023–24	Augustana	12–18–4	†	—	
2024–25	Augustana	18–13–4	9–5–2	2nd	CCHA Quarterfinals
Augustana:		30–31–8	9–5–2		
Total:		30–31–8			
National champion Postseason invitational champion Conference regular season champion Conference regular season and conference tournament champion Division regular season champion Division regular season and conference tournament champion Conference tournament champion

† Augustana played a transition schedule and its conference games were not counted in the standings.

== Awards and honors ==
Award	Year
All-WCHA Second Team	2008–09
All-WCHA Third Team	2009–10
WCHA All-Tournament Team	2010
