= 2025 CCHA men's ice hockey tournament =

- Dates: March 7–21, 2025
- Teams: 8
- Finals site: Mayo Clinic Health System Event Center; Mankato, Minnesota
- Champions: Minnesota State (3rd title)
- Winning coach: Luke Strand (1st title)
- MVP: Evan Murr (Minnesota State)
- CCHA men's Ice Hockey Tournaments

The 2025 CCHA Tournament was the 46th tournament in the history of the Central Collegiate Hockey Association. It began on March 7 and ended on March 21, 2025. All games were played at home campus sites. By winning the tournament, Minnesota State received the CCHA's automatic bid for the 2025 NCAA Division I men's ice hockey tournament.

== Format ==
The first round of the postseason tournament features a best-of-three games format, while the semifinals and final are single games held at the campus sites of the highest remaining seeds. The top eight conference teams in the standings participated in the tournament. Teams are seeded No. 1 through No. 8 according to their final conference standings, with a tiebreaker system used to seed teams with an identical number of points accumulated. The higher-seeded teams each earned home ice and hosted one of the lower-seeded teams. The teams that advance out of the quarterfinals are reseeded according to the regular season standings. The semifinals and final are single-elimination games. The winners of the semifinals play one another to determine the conference tournament champion.

== Conference standings ==
2024–25 Central Collegiate Hockey Association standings
	Conference record											Overall record					
	GP	W	L	T	OTW	OTL	SW	PTS	PCT ^	GF	GA	GP	W	L	T	GF	GA
#14 Minnesota State †*	26	18	5	3	3	1	1	56	.718	77	37	39	27	9	3	113	58
Augustana	16	9	5	2	1	1	1	30	.625	48	37	35	18	13	4	97	75
St. Thomas	26	13	9	4	1	1	1	42	.564	76	66	38	19	14	5	111	101
Bowling Green	26	12	10	4	2	3	2	43	.551	69	63	36	18	14	4	90	85
Michigan Tech	26	12	11	3	1	1	1	40	.513	75	69	36	16	17	3	95	96
Ferris State	26	12	13	1	1	0	0	36	.462	74	81	36	13	20	3	89	128
Bemidji State	26	10	12	4	3	1	4	36	.462	63	78	38	15	18	5	93	114
Lake Superior State	26	10	15	1	0	4	0	35	.449	71	76	36	12	22	2	93	115
Northern Michigan	26	4	20	2	1	1	2	16	.205	42	88	34	5	27	2	55	115
Championship: March 21, 2025 † indicates conference regular-season champion (MacNaughton Cup) * indicates conference tournament champion (Mason Cup)^ Because Augustana played a transition schedule of 16 games against conference opponents, winning percentage was used to determine conference position. Rankings: USCHO.com Top 20 Poll

== Bracket ==
Quarterfinals; March 7–9
1	Minnesota State	4	3	–
8	Lake Superior State	1	2	–
2	Augustana	3	3	2
7	Bemidji State	1	4	3*
(Teams are reseeded after the Quarterfinal round)
3	St. Thomas	7	4	–
6	Ferris State	3	1	–
4	Bowling Green	2**	4	–
5	Michigan Tech	1	0	–

Semifinals; March 15
1	Minnesota State	4
7	Bemidji State	0
3	St. Thomas	3
4	Bowling Green	1

Championship; March 21
1	Minnesota State	4
3	St. Thomas	2

Note: * denotes overtime period(s)

== Results ==
Note: All game times are local.

=== Quarterfinals ===
==== (1) Minnesota State vs. (8) Lake Superior State ====
March 7, 2025; 7:07 pm	Minnesota State	4–1 (2–1, 0–0, 2–0)	Lake Superior State	Mayo Clinic Health System Event Center; Attendance: —

Game reference

Alex Tracy
Goalies
Rorke Applebee
Referees:
Brady Johnson
Bobby Lukkason
Linesmen:
Tyler Landman
Nathan Voll

(Benincasa, Bohlsen) Zach Krajnik (2) – 05:12	1–0
(Benincasa, Carrabes) Zach Krajnik (3) – GW – 13:28	2–0
	2–1	16:15 – Timo Bakos (10) (Levandowski)
(Murr, Bergmanis) Brian Carrabes (10) – 43:10	3–1
(Cichosz, Wheeler) Zach Krajnik (4) – EN – 58:04	4–1

6 min
Penalties
2 min
26
Shots
21

March 8, 2025; 6:07 pm	Minnesota State	3–2 (1–1, 2–1, 0–0)	Lake Superior State	Mayo Clinic Health System Event Center; Attendance: 3,627

Game reference

Alex Tracy
Goalies
Rorke Applebee
Referees:
Brady Johnson
Bobby Lukkason
Linesmen:
Tyler Landman
Nathan Voll

	0–1	02:58 – Blake Humphrey (2) (Milburn)
(Hillman, Power) Luc Wilson (7) – 04:05	1–1
	1–2	22:32 – Grant Hindman (3) (Herrington, Venegoni)
(Benincasa, Ashton) Zach Krajnik (5) – 22:47	2–2
(Carrabes) Evan Murr (6) – GW – 26:04	3–2

2 min
Penalties
4 min
35
Shots
22

Minnesota State wins series 2–0

==== (2) Augustana vs. (7) Bemidji State ====
March 7, 2025; 7:07 pm	Augustana	3–1 (0–0, 0–1, 3–0)	Bemidji State	Midco Arena; Attendance: 3,116

Game reference

Josh Kotai
Goalies
Mattias Sholl
Referees:
Rich Nelson
Sterling Egan
Linesmen:
Kyle Domin
Andrew Dokken

	0–1	33:53 – SH – Kirklan Irey (11) (Jutting)
(Baumgartner, Friesen) Simon Falk (4) – 43:50	1–1
(Hennen) Owen Baumgartner (2) – GW – 46:57	2–1
(Langus, DelGreco) Colton Friesen (7) – 47:41	3–1

2 min
Penalties
28 min
28
Shots
19

March 8, 2025; 6:07 pm	Augustana	3–4 (0–0, 2–2, 1–2)	Bemidji State	Midco Arena; Attendance: 3,085

Game reference

Josh Kotai
Goalies
Mattias Sholl
Referees:
Rich Nelson
Sterling Egan
Linesmen:
Kyle Domin
Andrew Dokken

	0–1	22:43 – PP – Reilly Funk (7) (Martin, Corcoran)
	0–2	26:45 – Jackson Jutting (13) (Corcoran, Quinn)
(Falk, Friesen) Quinn Rudrud (6) – 27:37	1–2
(Friesen, McIntyre) Simon Falk (5) – 39:41	2–2
	2–3	44:05 – Tony Follmer (2) (Jutting)
	2–4	44:56 – GW – Adam Flammang (4) (Panzer, Satosaari)
(DelGreco, Mobley) Nace Langus (6) – 49:20	3–4

6 min
Penalties
2 min
26
Shots
34

March 9, 2025; 5:07 pm	Augustana	2–3 (OT) (1–1, 1–0, 0–1, 0–1)	Bemidji State	Midco Arena; Attendance: 2,895

Game reference

Josh Kotai
Goalies
Mattias Sholl
Referees:
Rich Nelson
Sterling Egan
Linesmen:
Kyle Domin
Andrew Dokken

	0–1	04:28 – PP – Jackson Jutting (14) (Magnussen, Flammang)
(Meerman, McIntyre) Hunter Bischoff (9) – 11:35	1–1
(Baumgartner, Meerman) Hunter Bischoff (10) – 29:12	2–1
	2–2	53:41 – Noah Quinn (6) (Corcoran, Funk)
	2–3	64:13 – GW – Adam Flammang (5) (Vaisanen, Satosaari)

6 min
Penalties
10 min
43
Shots
30

Bemidji State wins series 2–1

==== (3) St. Thomas vs. (6) Ferris State ====
March 7, 2025; 7:00 pm	St. Thomas	7–3 (4–3, 1–0, 2–0)	Ferris State	St. Thomas Ice Arena; Attendance: 447

Game reference

Jake Sibell
Goalies
Noah West
Referees:
Michael Forys
Andrew Rasky
Linesmen:
Eric Froberg
Jamie Grace

	0–1	01:31 – Jack Silich (3) (Badal, DeVita)
(Gauer, Foley) Liam Malmquist (14) – 05:47	1–1
(O'Neill, Gay) Jake Braccini (9) – 05:59	2–1
	2–2	09:53 – Zach Faremouth (8) (Gault, Ergang)
(Gleason, Wahlin) Liam Malmquist (15) – 14:27	3–2
	3–3	18:16 – PP – Logan Heroux (3) (Silich, Schleppe)
(Sterzer, Laylin) Quinton Pepper (1) – GW – 19:11	4–3
(unassisted) Lucas Wahlin (17) – SH – 35:56	5–3
(Braccini, Elias) Cooper Gay (17) – 50:12	6–3
(O'Neill, Miller) Cooper Gay (18) – 54:05	7–3

12 min
Penalties
10 min
37
Shots
31

March 8, 2025; 6:00 pm	St. Thomas	4–1 (0–0, 2–0, 2–1)	Ferris State	St. Thomas Ice Arena; Attendance: 462

Game reference

Jake Sibell
Goalies
Noah West
Referees:
Michael Forys
Andrew Rasky
Linesmen:
Eric Froberg
Jamie Grace

(Gleason, Malmquist) Grant Docter (2) – 24:54	1–0
(Wahlin) Liam Malmquist (16) – GW SH – 32:32	2–0
(Wahlin, Gleason) Liam Malmquist (17) – 55:01	3–0
	3–1	57:57 – Caiden Gault (3) (Silich, Schleppe)
(Cheslock, Foley) Liam Malmquist (18) – EN – 59:35	4–1

6 min
Penalties
4 min
28
Shots
26

St. Thomas wins series 2–0

==== (4) Bowling Green vs. (5) Michigan Tech ====
March 7, 2025; 7:07 pm	Bowling Green	2–1 (OT) (1–0, 0–0, 0–1, 1–0)	Michigan Tech	Slater Family Ice Arena; Attendance: 1,750

Game reference

Christian Stoever
Goalies
Ryan Manzella
Referees:
Steve McInchak
Bruce Vida Jr.
Linesmen:
Patrick Giles
Nick Huff

(Waters) Jaden Grant (5) – 19:40	1–0
	1–1	41:32 – Stiven Sardarian (11) (Morrell, Pietila)
(Doran, Parker) Quinn Emerson (5) – GW – 65:01	2–1

6 min
Penalties
4 min
31
Shots
21

March 8, 2025; 7:07 pm	Bowling Green	4–0 (2–0, 0–0, 2–0)	Michigan Tech	Slater Family Ice Arena; Attendance: 2,605

Game reference

Christian Stoever
Goalies
Ryan Manzella
Referees:
Steve McInchak
Bruce Vida Jr.
Linesmen:
Patrick Giles
Nick Huff

(O'Hara, Doran) Quinn Emerson (6) – GW – 12:12	1–0
(Grant, Doran) Ethan Scardina (6) – PP – 14:11	2–0
(Grant) Maxwell Martin (6) – 48:40	3–0
(Scardina) Ben Doran (10) – EN – 55:38	4–0

8 min
Penalties
6 min
28
Shots
27

Bowling Green wins series 2–0

=== Semifinals ===
==== (1) Minnesota State vs. (7) Bemidji State ====
March 15, 2025; 7:07 pm	Minnesota State	4–0 (1–0, 1–0, 2–0)	Bemidji State	Mayo Clinic Health System Event Center; Attendance: 3,557

Game reference

Alex Tracy
Goalies
Mattias Sholl
Referees:
Stephen McInchak
Bruce Vida Jr.
Linesmen:
Patrick Giles
Nick Huff

(Benincasa) Zach Krajnik (6) – GW – 08:06	1–0
(Bergmanis, Groll) Adam Eisele (12) – 36:39	2–0
(Pitlick) Adam Eisele (13) – 46:51	3–0
(Cichosz) Kaden Bohlsen (10) – EN – 58:17	4–0

4 min
Penalties
0 min
23
Shots
27

==== (3) St. Thomas vs. (4) Bowling Green ====
March 15, 2025; 4:07 pm	St. Thomas	3–1 (0–0, 1–1, 2–0)	Bowling Green	St. Thomas Ice Arena; Attendance: 575

Game reference

Jake Sibell
Goalies
Christian Stoever
Referees:
Brady Johnson
Bobby Lukkason
Linesmen:
Tyler Landman
Nathan Voll

(Gauer, Peters) Casy Laylin (4) – 25:40	1–0
	1–1	37:45 – Ethan Scardina (7) (Norris, Stjernberg)
(Wahlin) Liam Malmquist (19) – GW – 47:47	2–1
(Malmquist) Cooper Gay (19) – EN – 59:25	3–1

6 min
Penalties
6 min
29
Shots
33

=== Championship ===
==== (1) Minnesota State vs. (3) St. Thomas ====
March 21, 2025; 7:07 pm	Minnesota State	4–2 (0–0, 2–2, 2–0)	St. Thomas	Mayo Clinic Health System Event Center; Attendance: 4,538

Game reference

Alex Tracy
Goalies
Jake Sibell
Referees:
Brady Johnson
Bobby Lukkason
Linesmen:
Tyler Landman
Nathan Voll

	0–1	26:56 – Matthew Gleason (11) (unassisted)
(Pitlick) Luigi Benincasa (6) – PP – 30:40	1–1
(Benincasa, Krajnik) Kaden Bohlsen (19) – 33:14	2–1
	2–2	33:14 – Liam Malmquist (20) (O'Neill, Wahlin)
(Bergmanis, Pitlick) Evan Murr (7) – GW – 50:13	3–2
(unassisted) Josh Groll (14) – EN – 59:17	4–2

2 min
Penalties
2 min
35
Shots
31

== Tournament awards ==
=== Three Stars ===
- 1st Evan Murr* (Minnesota State)
- 2nd Luigi Benincasa (Minnesota State)
- 3rd Liam Malmquist (St. Thomas)

* Most Valuable Player(s)
