= St. Thomas Ice Arena =

Ice hockey arena in Mendota Heights, Minnesota

- Interactive map of St. Thomas Ice Arena
- Location: 950 Mendota Heights Rd; Mendota Heights, Minnesota; 55120
- Coordinates: 44°51′52″N 93°08′14″W
- Owner: St. Thomas Academy
- Capacity: 1,000 (ice hockey)
- Surface: 200 by 85 feet (61 m × 26 m) (ice hockey)

Construction
- Opened: November 1, 2003; 22 years ago
- Cost: $4 million (equivalent to $7,000,000 in 2025)

Tenants
- Saint Thomas Academy boys hockey (2003–present); University of St. Thomas men's ice hockey (2003–2025); University of St. Thomas women's ice hockey (2003–2025)

St. Thomas Ice Arena is a 1,000-seat ice hockey arena in Mendota Heights, Minnesota. Opened in 2003, it is home to the Saint Thomas Academy boys hockey team. The arena also hosted the University of St. Thomas Tommies men's and women's teams from opening until 2025.

== History ==
The St. Thomas Ice Arena was developed through a partnership between St. Thomas Academy and the University of St. Thomas to provide a dedicated home rink for both institutions. Previously, the university’s men's hockey team played at the State Fair Coliseum and the women's played at Parade Ice Garden, and the academy had no rink of its own. Plans called for a $4 million, 1,000-seat arena to be built on the academy’s Mendota Heights campus.

Financing involved city-issued bonds, with a nonprofit formed to own and operate the facility and rental fees covering costs. Designed primarily for hockey, the arena could also host other sports. The project reflected a renewed collaboration between the two schools, which share historical ties dating back to their joint founding in 1885, despite no longer sharing a formal connection.

In 2019, the arena served as the site for the National Championship in NCAA Division III women's ice hockey.

In 2023, the University of St. Thomas announced plans for Lee and Penny Anderson Arena, an on-campus hockey arena in Saint Paul. The final University of St. Thomas games were played in the arena in 2025.
