= Augustana University Vikings men's ice hockey =

- Current season
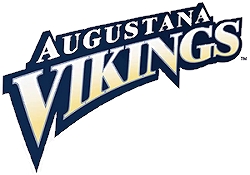
- University: Augustana University
- Conference: CCHA
- First season: 2023–24
- Head coach: Garrett Raboin; 2nd season, 30–31–8 (.493)
- Assistant coaches: Taylor Nelson; Blake Hietala; Brady Ferner
- Arena: Midco Arena; Sioux Falls, South Dakota
- Colors: Navy and Gold

The Augustana Vikings men's ice hockey is an NCAA Division I ice hockey team that began play in the fall of 2023.

== History ==
In the summer of 2021, in accordance with plans for Augustana University to raise its athletic programs from NCAA Division II to Division I, the university announced that there was interest in adding a men's ice hockey program. After receiving donations from several sources, spearheaded by T. Denny Sanford, the school was able to move forward with plans for the hockey program, despite the elevation of its other programs to Division I being abandoned. On October 5, 2021, the school broke ground on the Midco Arena, a $40 million, 3,000-seat venue to be used as the team's home rink. On April 18, 2022, the program announced the hiring of Minnesota Golden Gophers' assistant coach Garrett Raboin as the team's inaugural head coach.

The program is the first varsity ice hockey team at any level to call South Dakota home. The Vikings played the first hockey game in team history on October 7, 2023, a 0–4 loss at Wisconsin. A week later, the team played their first home games at the Denny Sanford Premier Center, their home for five games while Midco Arena finished its construction. The team would earn their first wins in this series with a sweep of Bowling Green. On January 26, 2024, Midco Arena opened, and the Vikings have played there ever since. Augie finished its first season as an Independent at a 12–18–4 record.

In mid-2022, the CCHA announced they would be granting the Vikings membership starting in the 2025–26 season with a transitional schedule for their first two seasons, however, in July 2024, the CCHA granted the Vikings full membership for the 2024–25 season, a year ahead of schedule. This allowed the Vikings to compete for a conference championship while playing their abbreviated transitional schedule, leading the CCHA to adopt a points-percentage ranking for determining conference standings due to Augie playing fewer games than the rest of the conference. Augie saw a huge increase in quality of play in their second season, finishing with a 18–13–4 record. The Vikings held first place in the CCHA at various points late in the season, eventually finishing at second place. They played their first conference tournament games in program history against Bemidji State, where they were upset by the seventh-seeded Beavers at home in three games.

The 2025–26 season will mark the completion of Augie's transition into the CCHA, as they will play their first full conference schedule.

== All-time coaching records ==
As of the completion of 2024–25 season

| Tenure | Coach | Years | Record | Pct. |
|---|---|---|---|---|
| 2023–Present | Garrett Raboin | 2 | 30–31–8 | .493 |
| Totals | 1 coach | 2 season | 30–31–8 | .493 |

== Current roster ==
As of August 29, 2025.

| No. | Nat. | Player | Class | Pos | Height | Weight | DoB | Hometown | Previous team | NHL rights |
|---|---|---|---|---|---|---|---|---|---|---|
| 1 | (United States) | Christian Manz | Sophomore | G | 6' 0" (1.83 m) | 181 lb (82 kg) | 2004-01-13 | Blaine, Minnesota | Sioux Falls Stampede (USHL) | — |
| 2 | (United States) | Landon Fandel | Freshman | D | 5' 10" (1.78 m) | 185 lb (84 kg) | 2005-05-24 | Sioux Falls, South Dakota | Tri-City Storm (USHL) | — |
| 4 | (Canada) | Max Chakrabarti | Freshman | D | 6' 3" (1.91 m) | 181 lb (82 kg) | 2005-06-21 | Surrey, British Columbia | Weyburn Red Wings (SJHL) | — |
| 5 | (United States) | Easton Young | Sophomore | D | 5' 11" (1.8 m) | 185 lb (84 kg) | 2003-07-25 | Grand Rapids, Michigan | Johnstown Tomahawks (NAHL) | — |
| 6 | (Finland) | Samo Meritähti | Sophomore (RS) | D | 6' 3" (1.91 m) | 192 lb (87 kg) | 2003-03-06 | Seinäjoki, Finland | Providence (HEA) | — |
| 8 | (United States) | Ben Troumbly | Senior | F | 5' 7" (1.7 m) | 160 lb (73 kg) | 2001-11-21 | Bovey, Minnesota | Bismarck Bobcats (NAHL) | — |
| 9 | (United States) | Hayden Hennen | Junior | D | 6' 4" (1.93 m) | 175 lb (79 kg) | 2002-08-13 | Hallock, Minnesota | Anchorage Wolverines (NAHL) | — |
| 10 | (United States) | Joey DelGreco | Sophomore | F | 6' 2" (1.88 m) | 210 lb (95 kg) | 2003-11-25 | Plymouth, Minnesota | Chicago Steel (USHL) | — |
| 11 | (United States) | Tyler Hennen | Sophomore | F | 5' 11" (1.8 m) | 150 lb (68 kg) | 2004-08-31 | Hallock, Minnesota | Anchorage Wolverines (NAHL) | — |
| 12 | (United States) | Hunter Bischoff | Junior | F | 6' 1" (1.85 m) | 182 lb (83 kg) | 2003-03-24 | Cohasset, Minnesota | Youngstown Phantoms (USHL) | — |
| 13 | (United States) | Will Howard | Junior | F | 6' 2" (1.88 m) | 195 lb (88 kg) | 2002-07-30 | Grand Forks, North Dakota | New Mexico Ice Wolves (NAHL) | — |
| 19 | (United States) | Will Svenddal | Junior | D | 6' 1" (1.85 m) | 195 lb (88 kg) | 2001-10-12 | Minneapolis, Minnesota | Minnesota Magicians (NAHL) | — |
| 20 | (Finland) | Jacob Jastrzebski | Freshman | F | 6' 0" (1.83 m) | 192 lb (87 kg) | 2005-07-27 | Chicago, Illinois | Des Moines Buccaneers (USHL) | — |
| 21 | (United States) | Quinn Rudrud | Senior | F | 6' 3" (1.91 m) | 185 lb (84 kg) | 2001-08-18 | Farmington, Minnesota | Alaska (NCAA) | — |
| 23 | (United States) | Carter Theissen | Sophomore | D | 5' 11" (1.8 m) | 181 lb (82 kg) | 2003-07-10 | Plymouth, Minnesota | Wisconsin Windigo (NAHL) | — |
| 24 | (Canada) | Colton Friesen | Senior | F | 5' 10" (1.78 m) | 170 lb (77 kg) | 2001-12-09 | Winnipeg, Manitoba | Wisconsin–Superior (WIAC) | — |
| 26 | (Canada) | Callum Gau | Junior | F | 6' 2" (1.88 m) | 180 lb (82 kg) | 2002-06-19 | Camrose, Alberta | Camrose Kodiaks (AJHL) | — |
| 27 | (United States) | Garett Drotts | Sophomore | F | 6' 0" (1.83 m) | 174 lb (79 kg) | 2003-11-21 | Grand Rapids, Michigan | Des Moines Buccaneers (USHL) | — |
| 30 | (Canada) | Kolby Hay | Freshman | G | 6' 5" (1.96 m) | 185 lb (84 kg) | 2004-05-14 | Kamloops, British Columbia | Greenville Swamp Rabbits (ECHL) | — |
| 32 | (Canada) | Josh Kotai | Junior | G | 6' 2" (1.88 m) | 175 lb (79 kg) | 2003-03-13 | Abbotsford, British Columbia | Battlefords North Stars (SJHL) | — |
| 72 | (Canada) | Brett Meerman | Junior | F | 5' 9" (1.75 m) | 177 lb (80 kg) | 2002-02-04 | Blackfalds, Alberta | Blackfalds Bulldogs (AJHL) | — |
| 81 | (United States) | Owen Bohn | Junior | F | 5' 11" (1.8 m) | 165 lb (75 kg) | 2002-02-12 | Morgan Hill, California | Victoria Grizzlies (BCHL) | — |
| 84 | (United States) | Jeff Hutchinson | Junior | D | 6' 2" (1.88 m) | 200 lb (91 kg) | 2002-05-02 | St. Louis, Missouri | New Mexico Ice Wolves (NAHL) | — |
| 86 | (Slovenia) | Nace Langus | Sophomore | F | 6' 1" (1.85 m) | 190 lb (86 kg) | 2004-12-05 | Jesenice, Slovenia | IK Oskarshamn J20 (J20 Nationell) | — |
| 92 | (Belarus) | Leo Bulgakov | Freshman | F | 5' 9" (1.75 m) | 165 lb (75 kg) | 2004-11-12 | Minsk, Belarus | Aberdeen Wings (NAHL) | — |
| 93 | (Canada) | Cole Burtch | Junior (RS) | F | 5' 10" (1.78 m) | 168 lb (76 kg) | 2001-01-11 | Markham, Ontario | Ferris State (CCHA) | — |
| 96 | (United States) | Owen Baumgartner | Junior | D | 5' 10" (1.78 m) | 185 lb (84 kg) | 2002-07-01 | Owatonna, Minnesota | Air Force (NAHL) | — |

== Awards and honors ==
=== CCHA ===
Player of the Year

- Josh Kotai: 2026

Goaltender of the Year

- Josh Kotai: 2026

==== All-conference teams ====
First Team All-CCHA

- 2025–26: Josh Kotai, G

Second Team All-CCHA

- 2024–25: Josh Kotai, G; Luke Mobley, F

== Statistical leaders ==
=== Career points leaders ===
| Player | Years | GP | G | A | Pts | PIM |
|---|---|---|---|---|---|---|
| Luke Mobley | 2023–present | 68 | 25 | 14 | 39 | 37 |
| Brett Meerman | 2023–present | 64 | 10 | 26 | 36 | 4 |
| Hunter Bischoff | 2023–present | 61 | 14 | 17 | 31 | 16 |
| Hayden Hennen | 2023–present | 66 | 7 | 22 | 29 | 39 |
| Colton Friesen | 2023–present | 56 | 10 | 18 | 28 | 12 |
| Ryan Naumovski | 2023–2024 | 34 | 8 | 17 | 25 | 0 |
| Owen Bohn | 2023–present | 54 | 12 | 12 | 24 | 26 |
| Simon Falk | 2023–present | 58 | 5 | 18 | 23 | 6 |
| Uula Ruikka | 2023–present | 53 | 7 | 15 | 22 | 42 |
| Evan McIntyre | 2023–present | 69 | 4 | 18 | 22 | 40 |

=== Career goaltending leaders ===
GP = Games played; Min = Minutes played; W = Wins; L = Losses; T = Ties; GA = Goals against; SO = Shutouts; SV% = Save percentage; GAA = Goals against average

minimum 30 games played

| Player | Years | GP | Min | W | L | T | GA | SO | SV% | GAA |
|---|---|---|---|---|---|---|---|---|---|---|
| Josh Kotai | 2023–present | 44 | 2532 | 19 | 19 | 5 | 98 | 3 | .926 | 2.32 |

Statistics current through the end of the 2024–25 season.
