= 2022–23 Minnesota State Mavericks men's ice hockey season =

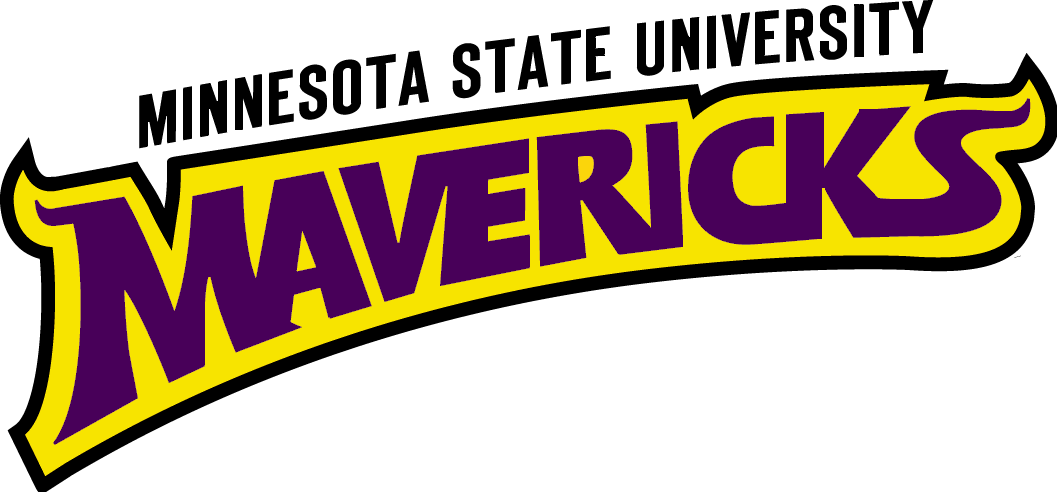

CCHA, Champion CCHA Tournament, Champion NCAA Tournament, Regional Semifinal
- Conference: 1st CCHA
- Home ice: Mayo Clinic Health System Event Center

Rankings
- USCHO: #12
- USA Today: #11

Record
- Overall: 25–13–1
- Conference: 16–9–1
- Home: 14–6–1
- Road: 11–6–0
- Neutral: 0–1–0

Coaches and captains
- Head coach: Mike Hastings
- Assistant coaches: Todd Knott; Paul Kirtland; Cory Lonke
- Captain(s): Cade Borchardt; Brendan Furry
- Alternate captain(s): Jake Livingstone; Sam Morton

The 2022–23 Minnesota State Mavericks men's ice hockey season was the 54th season of play for the program, 27th at the Division I level, and 2nd in the CCHA. The Mavericks represented Minnesota State University, Mankato in the 2022–23 NCAA Division I men's ice hockey season, were coached by Mike Hastings, in his 11th season, and played their home games at Mayo Clinic Health System Event Center.

== Season ==
After coming within 1 period of winning a national championship, Minnesota State lost many of the key players that brought it near the pinnacle of college hockey. Aside from losing half of its defensive corps, including the team captain, MSU also lost its top two scorers and Hobey Baker Award-winning starting goaltender. Despite those departures, the cupboard was not bare for the Mavericks and the team was still expected to compete for another tournament berth, as their preseason ranking indicated.

The Mavs started the season well, earning a split with preseason #2 Minnesota and then sweeping another highly ranked team in Minnesota Duluth the following week. The team stumbled a bit in the third week by dropping both games to St. Cloud State but a pair of 1-goal losses weren't expected to harm the team's tournament hopes too much.

During the first half of the season, the team alternated between Keenan Rancier and Alexander Tracy as the starting goaltender to determine which, if either, would become the Mavericks primary netminder. While both were insulated by a defense that gave up less than 22 shots against per game, Rancier was much better at stopping the puck and eventually won the job as the No. 1 goalie. The offense was less able to cope with the loss of its high-end scorers and ended up scoring 52 fewer goals over the course of the season, albeit in 5 fewer games. David Silye saw a vast improvement in his output as he became the team's top producer and he was aided by addition of Christian Fitzgerald.

When MSU began their conference schedule that didn't seem to have any trouble scoring, however, as the Mavs won each of their first 4 games. Unfortunately, as the club rolled into November, the goals became a bit more scarce and Minnesota State's record suffered as a result. Over a month-long stretch, Minnesota State went 3–5–1 and were swept twice at home. The winter break could not have come at a better time as the team was mired in mediocrity and were about to fall out of the polls for the first time in five years.

Desperately needing a winning streak to save their season, the Mavericks offence found some consistency and scored at least 3 goals in each of their games during the month of January. With Rancier settling down in the goal, Minnesota State won 8 consecutive games and pulled themselves back about the cutline for the tournament. Additionally, they placed themselves near the top of the CCHA standings and were in line to repeat as league champions. The Mavs stumbled a bit at the end, earning splits in each of their final three weekends and were in the middle of the bubble for the tournament when they began their postseason push.

With their position in the PairWise rankings, Minnesota State needed a good performance in the conference tournament to ensure themselves a spot in the NCAA tournament. A quarterfinal exit would have essentially eliminated the Mavericks while an appearance in the championship game could have allowed them to earn an at-large bid. In any event, the only sure way for the team to make the tournament was to win the championship and they started in the best possible position. Because MSU had (barely) finished as the No. 1 team in the conference, they were rewarded with a quarterfinal matchup against Lake Superior State. The Lakers put up a valiant effort but MSU outshot their opponents 72–36 in the two games and rose a strong power play into the semifinal. The Mavs were equally as impressive against Ferris State with a 7–2 victory and set up a showdown with an upstart Northern Michigan team in the final.

Due to how the other conferences had played, both teams were fighting for their postseason lives as a loss would leave MSU out in the cold while NMU's only chance from the start was a conference title. While Minnesota State outshout their opponents as usual, Northern Michigan was not far behind with a margin of 33–25. The biggest problem for the Mavs was that the Wildcat goalie, Béni Halász, had gotten hot at the end of the season and was continuing his strong play by shutting down the MSU offense. The lack of scoring enabled Northern Michigan to build a 2-goal lead and take it deep into the third period. MSU was forced to pull Rancier for an extra attacker with several minutes to play. Fortunately, the desperate ploy worked and Minnesota State scored twice in the final two and a half minutes to tie the game. The sudden reversal in fortune sapped all the energy from the Wildcats and it took just 68 seconds of overtime for Zach Krajnik to send the Mavs into the NCAA tournament.

In their opening game of the tournament, MSU was given the chance for revenge against St. Cloud State and the Mavs got off to s fast start. Minnesota State carried the pace of play for the entire game, outshooting the Huskies 34–21 and getting several scoring chances. However, nothing they did resulted in a goal. Jaxon Castor played a masterful game for St. Cloud and prevented the Mavericks from getting a single goal to their credit. A furious attempt to tie the game in the third only enabled the Huskies to double their goal total to 4 over the final 30 minutes and end the Mavericks' season.

== Departures ==
| Player | Position | Nationality | Cause |
|---|---|---|---|
| Wyatt Aamodt | Defenseman | United States | Graduation (signed with Colorado Avalanche) |
| Evan Foss | Goaltender | United States | Left program (retired) |
| Reggie Lutz | Forward | United States | Graduation (retired) |
| Benton Maass | Defenseman | United States | Graduation (signed with Hershey Bears) |
| Dryden McKay | Goaltender | United States | Graduation (signed with Toronto Marlies) |
| Jack McNeely | Defenseman | United States | Graduation (retired) |
| Julian Napravnik | Forward | Germany | Graduation (signed with Hershey Bears) |
| Nathan Smith | Forward | United States | Signed professional contract (Arizona Coyotes) |

== Recruiting ==
| Player | Position | Nationality | Age | Notes |
|---|---|---|---|---|
| Campbell Cichosz | Defenseman | United States | 21 | Albert Lea, MN |
| Adam Eisele | Forward | United States | 21 | Lake Elmo, MN |
| Christian Fitzgerald | Forward | Canada | 20 | Coquitlam, BC |
| Simon Tassy | Forward | Canada | 21 | Montreal, QC |
| Alexander Tracy | Goaltender | United States | 21 | Chicago, IL |
| Mason Wheeler | Defenseman | United States | 21 | Inver Grove Heights, MN |
| Luc Wilson | Forward | United States | 20 | Duncan, BC |

== Roster ==
As of August 6, 2022.

| No. | Nat. | Player | Class | Pos | Height | Weight | DoB | Hometown | Previous team | NHL rights |
|---|---|---|---|---|---|---|---|---|---|---|
| 2 | (Canada) | Akito Hirose | Junior | D | 6' 0" (1.83 m) | 165 lb (75 kg) | 1999-04-09 | Calgary, Alberta | Salmon Arm Silverbacks (BCHL) | — |
| 3 | (Canada) | Christian Fitzgerald | Freshman | F | 6' 0" (1.83 m) | 185 lb (84 kg) | 2002-05-31 | Coquitlam, British Columbia | Tri-City Storm (USHL) | — |
| 4 | (United States) | Andy Carroll | Senior | D | 6' 0" (1.83 m) | 185 lb (84 kg) | 1997-02-17 | Northfield, Minnesota | Green Bay Gamblers (USHL) | — |
| 5 | (United States) | Mason Wheeler | Freshman | D | 6' 1" (1.85 m) | 195 lb (88 kg) | 2001-09-29 | Inver Grove Heights, Minnesota | Tri-City Storm (USHL) | — |
| 6 | (United States) | Sam Morton (A) | Senior | D | 6' 0" (1.83 m) | 177 lb (80 kg) | 1999-07-28 | Lafayette, Colorado | Wenatchee Wild (BCHL) | — |
| 7 | (Canada) | Luc Wilson | Freshman | F | 5' 8" (1.73 m) | 170 lb (77 kg) | 2001-11-22 | Duncan, British Columbia | Penticton Vees (BCHL) | — |
| 8 | (United States) | Campbell Cichosz | Freshman | D | 6' 0" (1.83 m) | 174 lb (79 kg) | 2001-08-23 | Albert Lea, Minnesota | Anchorage Wolverines (NAHL) | — |
| 9 | (United States) | Tanner Edwards | Sophomore | F | 6' 0" (1.83 m) | 177 lb (80 kg) | 2000-03-11 | Anchorage, Alaska | Muskegon Lumberjacks (USHL) | — |
| 10 | (Canada) | David Silye | Junior | F | 5' 11" (1.8 m) | 184 lb (83 kg) | 1999-03-02 | Arnprior, Ontario | Clarkson (ECAC) | — |
| 11 | (Canada) | Simon Tassy | Freshman | F | 6' 2" (1.88 m) | 190 lb (86 kg) | 2001-03-21 | Montreal, Quebec | Salmon Arm Silverbacks (BCHL) | — |
| 12 | (United States) | Josh Groll | Junior | F | 5' 11" (1.8 m) | 182 lb (83 kg) | 2001-08-09 | San Diego, California | Michigan (Big Ten) | — |
| 13 | (United States) | Brendan Furry (C) | Senior | F | 6' 1" (1.85 m) | 194 lb (88 kg) | 1998-07-08 | Toledo, Ohio | Tri-City Storm (USHL) | — |
| 14 | (United States) | Ryan Sandelin | Senior | F | 6' 0" (1.83 m) | 186 lb (84 kg) | 1999-01-03 | Hermantown, Minnesota | Penticton Vees (BCHL) | — |
| 15 | (United States) | Adam Eisele | Freshman | F | 6' 1" (1.85 m) | 190 lb (86 kg) | 2001-07-11 | Lake Elmo, Minnesota | Penticton Vees (BCHL) | — |
| 17 | (United States) | Bennett Zmolek | Sophomore | D | 6' 3" (1.91 m) | 191 lb (87 kg) | 2002-04-17 | Rochester, Minnesota | Youngstown Phantoms (USHL) | — |
| 18 | (Czech Republic) | Ondřej Pavel | Junior | F | 6' 2" (1.88 m) | 204 lb (93 kg) | 2000-08-29 | Prague, Czech Republic | Fargo Force (USHL) | — |
| 19 | (United States) | Will Hillman | Sophomore | F | 6' 2" (1.88 m) | 178 lb (81 kg) | 2000-11-22 | Blaine, Minnesota | Youngstown Phantoms (USHL) | — |
| 20 | (Canada) | Connor Gregga | Junior | F | 5' 10" (1.78 m) | 177 lb (80 kg) | 2000-07-24 | Markham, Ontario | Coquitlam Express (BCHL) | — |
| 21 | (United States) | Lucas Sowder | Senior | F | 5' 11" (1.8 m) | 164 lb (74 kg) | 1998-11-15 | Trinity, Florida | Wenatchee Wild (BCHL) | — |
| 22 | (Canada) | Steven Bellini | Sophomore | D | 5' 11" (1.8 m) | 171 lb (78 kg) | 2000-05-23 | Sault Ste. Marie, Ontario | Tri-City Storm (USHL) | — |
| 23 | (Canada) | Jake Livingstone (A) | Junior | D | 6' 3" (1.91 m) | 201 lb (91 kg) | 1999-04-16 | Creston, British Columbia | Langley Rivermen (BCHL) | — |
| 24 | (United States) | Zach Krajnik | Sophomore | F | 5' 11" (1.8 m) | 174 lb (79 kg) | 1999-05-13 | Eagle River, Alaska | Kenai River Brown Bears (NAHL) | — |
| 25 | (United States) | Brenden Olson | Sophomore | F | 6' 1" (1.85 m) | 170 lb (77 kg) | 2000-10-18 | Eau Claire, Wisconsin | Sioux City Musketeers (USHL) | — |
| 27 | (United States) | Tony Malinowski | Junior | D | 6' 5" (1.96 m) | 205 lb (93 kg) | 1999-10-15 | Clarkston, Michigan | Des Moines Buccaneers (USHL) | — |
| 28 | (United States) | Cade Borchardt (C) | Senior | F | 5' 11" (1.8 m) | 172 lb (78 kg) | 1998-07-06 | Burnsville, Minnesota | Sioux Falls Stampede (USHL) | — |
| 32 | (United States) | Andrew Miller | Sophomore | G | 6' 0" (1.83 m) | 177 lb (80 kg) | 2000-02-10 | Boulder, Colorado | Fargo Force (USHL) | — |
| 33 | (United States) | Alex Tracy | Freshman | G | 6' 0" (1.83 m) | 187 lb (85 kg) | 2001-05-04 | Chicago, Illinois | Sioux City Musketeers (USHL) | — |
| 35 | (Canada) | Keenan Rancier | Sophomore | G | 6' 2" (1.88 m) | 184 lb (83 kg) | 2000-06-21 | Victoria, British Columbia | Minot Minotauros (NAHL) | — |

== Standings ==
2022–23 Central Collegiate Hockey Association Standings
| | Conference record | | | | | | | | | | Overall record | | | | | |
| | GP | W | L | T | OTW | OTL | SW | PTS | GF | GA | GP | W | L | T | GF | GA |
|---|---|---|---|---|---|---|---|---|---|---|---|---|---|---|---|---|
| #12 Minnesota State †* | 26 | 16 | 9 | 1 | 2 | 4 | 1 | 52 | 83 | 56 | 39 | 25 | 13 | 1 | 126 | 81 |
| #13 Michigan Tech | 26 | 15 | 7 | 4 | 0 | 1 | 0 | 50 | 68 | 54 | 39 | 24 | 11 | 4 | 103 | 88 |
| Bowling Green | 26 | 12 | 12 | 2 | 0 | 2 | 1 | 41 | 89 | 76 | 36 | 15 | 19 | 2 | 114 | 114 |
| Northern Michigan | 26 | 14 | 12 | 0 | 3 | 0 | 0 | 39 | 82 | 77 | 38 | 21 | 17 | 0 | 123 | 103 |
| Bemidji State | 26 | 12 | 11 | 3 | 3 | 1 | 2 | 39 | 73 | 63 | 36 | 14 | 17 | 5 | 94 | 97 |
| Ferris State | 26 | 9 | 14 | 3 | 1 | 2 | 3 | 34 | 62 | 91 | 37 | 14 | 19 | 4 | 92 | 131 |
| St. Thomas | 26 | 10 | 14 | 2 | 1 | 1 | 0 | 32 | 69 | 81 | 36 | 11 | 23 | 2 | 86 | 117 |
| Lake Superior State | 26 | 8 | 17 | 1 | 2 | 1 | 1 | 25 | 52 | 80 | 36 | 9 | 25 | 2 | 71 | 118 |
Championship: March 18, 2023 † indicates conference regular season champion (MacNaughton Cup) * indicates conference tournament champion (Mason Cup); Rankings: USCHO.com Top 20 Poll

== Schedule and results ==
| Date | Time | Opponent^{#} | Rank^{#} | Site | TV | Decision | Result | Attendance | Record |
Exhibition
| October 1 | 6:07 PM | at Omaha* | #3 | Baxter Arena • Omaha, Nebraska (Exhibition) | | Tracy | L 2–7 | 4,597 | |
Regular Season
| October 7 | 7:05 PM | at #2 Minnesota* | #5 | 3M Arena at Mariucci • Minneapolis, Minnesota | BSN | Rancier | L 1–4 | 8,472 | 0–1–0 |
| October 8 | 6:07 PM | #2 Minnesota* | #5 | Mayo Clinic Health System Event Center • Mankato, Minnesota | FOX 9+ | Rancier | W 3–2 | 4,911 | 1–1–0 |
| October 14 | 7:07 PM | #4 Minnesota Duluth* | #5 | Mayo Clinic Health System Event Center • Mankato, Minnesota | KEYC | Tracy | W 6–0 | 4,612 | 2–1–0 |
| October 15 | 6:07 PM | #4 Minnesota Duluth* | #5 | Mayo Clinic Health System Event Center • Mankato, Minnesota | KEYC | Tracy | W 2–1 | 5,039 | 3–1–0 |
| October 21 | 7:30 PM | at #8 St. Cloud State* | #2 | Herb Brooks National Hockey Center • St. Cloud, Minnesota | FOX 9+ | Rancier | L 2–3 | 4,016 | 3–2–0 |
| October 22 | 6:00 PM | at #8 St. Cloud State* | #2 | Herb Brooks National Hockey Center • St. Cloud, Minnesota | FOX 9+ | Tracy | L 3–4 | 5,212 | 3–3–0 |
| October 28 | 7:07 PM | Bowling Green | #8 | Mayo Clinic Health System Event Center • Mankato, Minnesota | KEYC | Tracy | W 3–2 ^{OT} | 4,172 | 4–3–0 (1–0–0) |
| October 29 | 6:07 PM | Bowling Green | #8 | Mayo Clinic Health System Event Center • Mankato, Minnesota | KEYC | Rancier | W 4–2 | 4,007 | 5–3–0 (2–0–0) |
| November 4 | 7:07 PM | at St. Thomas | #6 | St. Thomas Ice Arena • Mendota Heights, Minnesota | FloHockey | Tracy | W 7–2 | 961 | 6–3–0 (3–0–0) |
| November 5 | 6:07 PM | St. Thomas | #6 | Mayo Clinic Health System Event Center • Mankato, Minnesota | KEYC | Rancier | W 4–3 | 5,094 | 7–3–0 (4–0–0) |
| November 18 | 7:07 PM | Northern Michigan | #8 | Mayo Clinic Health System Event Center • Mankato, Minnesota | KEYC | Rancier | L 2–3 | 4,344 | 7–4–0 (4–1–0) |
| November 19 | 6:07 PM | Northern Michigan | #8 | Mayo Clinic Health System Event Center • Mankato, Minnesota | KEYC | Rancier | W 4–1 | 4,562 | 8–4–0 (5–1–0) |
| November 25 | 6:07 PM | at Michigan Tech | #10 | MacInnes Student Ice Arena • Houghton, Michigan | FloHockey | Rancier | L 2–3 | 2,492 | 8–5–0 (5–2–0) |
| November 26 | 5:07 PM | at Michigan Tech | #10 | MacInnes Student Ice Arena • Houghton, Michigan | FloHockey | Rancier | T 2–2 ^{SOW} | 2,418 | 8–5–1 (5–2–1) |
| December 2 | 7:07 PM | Ferris State | #11 | Mayo Clinic Health System Event Center • Mankato, Minnesota | KEYC | Rancier | L 1–2 | 4,199 | 8–6–1 (5–3–1) |
| December 3 | 6:07 PM | Ferris State | #11 | Mayo Clinic Health System Event Center • Mankato, Minnesota | KEYC | Rancier | L 2–3 | 4,318 | 8–7–1 (5–4–1) |
| December 9 | 6:07 PM | at Bowling Green | #16 | Slater Family Ice Arena • Bowling Green, Ohio | FloHockey | Tracy | W 2–1 | 2,312 | 9–7–1 (6–4–1) |
| December 10 | 6:07 PM | at Bowling Green | #16 | Slater Family Ice Arena • Bowling Green, Ohio | FloHockey | Tracy | W 6–2 | 2,024 | 10–7–1 (7–4–1) |
| December 16 | 7:07 PM | Bemidji State | #16 | Mayo Clinic Health System Event Center • Mankato, Minnesota | KEYC | Tracy | L 3–4 ^{OT} | 4,531 | 10–8–1 (7–5–1) |
| December 17 | 7:07 PM | Bemidji State | #16 | Mayo Clinic Health System Event Center • Mankato, Minnesota | KEYC | Tracy | L 1–4 | 4,524 | 10–9–1 (7–6–1) |
| January 6 | 6:07 PM | at Northern Michigan | #19 | Berry Events Center • Marquette, Michigan | FloHockey | Rancier | W 5–2 | 2,229 | 11–9–1 (8–6–1) |
| January 7 | 5:07 PM | at Northern Michigan | #19 | Berry Events Center • Marquette, Michigan | FloHockey | Rancier | W 5–3 | 2,766 | 12–9–1 (9–6–1) |
| January 13 | 8:00 PM | at Arizona State* | #17 | Mullett Arena • Tempe, Arizona | | Rancier | W 3–1 | 4,973 | 13–9–1 |
| January 14 | 8:00 PM | at Arizona State* | #17 | Mullett Arena • Tempe, Arizona | Pac-12 Insider | Rancier | W 5–0 | 5,179 | 14–9–1 |
| January 20 | 7:07 PM | Lake Superior State | #17 | Mayo Clinic Health System Event Center • Mankato, Minnesota | KEYC | Rancier | W 3–2 ^{OT} | 4,638 | 15–9–1 (10–6–1) |
| January 21 | 6:07 PM | Lake Superior State | #17 | Mayo Clinic Health System Event Center • Mankato, Minnesota | KEYC | Rancier | W 3–1 | 4,913 | 16–9–1 (11–6–1) |
| January 27 | 6:07 PM | at Ferris State | #14 | Ewigleben Arena • Big Rapids, Michigan | FloHockey | Rancier | W 4–1 | 1,571 | 17–9–1 (12–6–1) |
| January 28 | 5:07 PM | at Ferris State | #14 | Ewigleben Arena • Big Rapids, Michigan | FloHockey | Rancier | W 5–1 | 1,897 | 18–9–1 (13–6–1) |
| February 3 | 7:07 PM | St. Thomas | #13 | Mayo Clinic Health System Event Center • Mankato, Minnesota | KEYC | Rancier | L 2–3 ^{OT} | 4,814 | 18–10–1 (13–7–1) |
| February 4 | 6:07 PM | at St. Thomas | #13 | St. Thomas Ice Arena • Mendota Heights, Minnesota | FloHockey | Rancier | W 5–2 | 1,080 | 19–10–1 (14–7–1) |
| February 17 | 7:07 PM | at Bemidji State | #13 | Sanford Center • Bemidji, Minnesota | FloHockey | Rancier | W 4–1 | 1,892 | 20–10–1 (15–7–1) |
| February 18 | 6:07 PM | at Bemidji State | #13 | Sanford Center • Bemidji, Minnesota | FloHockey | Rancier | L 1–2 | 2,103 | 20–11–1 (15–8–1) |
| February 24 | 7:07 PM | #11 Michigan Tech | #12 | Mayo Clinic Health System Event Center • Mankato, Minnesota | KEYC | Rancier | L 0–2 | 4,716 | 20–12–1 (15–9–1) |
| February 25 | 6:07 PM | #11 Michigan Tech | #12 | Mayo Clinic Health System Event Center • Mankato, Minnesota | KEYC | Rancier | W 3–2 | 5,120 | 21–12–1 (16–9–1) |
CCHA Tournament
| March 3 | 7:07 PM | Lake Superior State* | #13 | Mayo Clinic Health System Event Center • Mankato, Minnesota (Quarterfinal Game 1) | FloHockey | Rancier | W 6–1 | 3,604 | 22–12–1 |
| March 4 | 6:07 PM | Lake Superior State* | #13 | Mayo Clinic Health System Event Center • Mankato, Minnesota (Quarterfinal Game 2) | FloHockey | Rancier | W 2–1 | 3,798 | 23–12–1 |
| March 11 | 6:07 PM | Ferris State* | #13 | Mayo Clinic Health System Event Center • Mankato, Minnesota (Semifinal) | FloHockey | Rancier | W 7–2 | 4,468 | 24–12–1 |
| March 18 | 6:07 PM | Northern Michigan* | #12 | Mayo Clinic Health System Event Center • Mankato, Minnesota (Championship) | FloHockey | Rancier | W 3–2 ^{OT} | 4,805 | 25–12–1 |
NCAA Tournament
| March 23 | 4:00 PM | vs. #6 St. Cloud State* | #10 | Scheels Arena • Fargo, North Dakota (West Regional Semifinal) | ESPNU | Rancier | L 0–4 | 5,061 | 25–13–1 |
*Non-conference game. ^{#}Rankings from USCHO.com Poll. All times are in Central Time. Source:

== Scoring statistics ==
| Name | Position | Games | Goals | Assists | Points | PIM |
|---|---|---|---|---|---|---|
| David Silye | C | 39 | 23 | 16 | 39 | 25 |
| Jake Livingstone | D | 39 | 8 | 27 | 35 | 30 |
| Christian Fitzgerald | F | 38 | 16 | 13 | 29 | 16 |
| Ryan Sandelin | C/RW | 38 | 14 | 15 | 29 | 33 |
| Brendan Furry | LW | 39 | 9 | 19 | 28 | 15 |
| Akito Hirose | D | 38 | 4 | 23 | 27 | 18 |
| Andy Carroll | D | 39 | 5 | 20 | 25 | 6 |
| Cade Borchardt | F | 39 | 5 | 15 | 20 | 12 |
| Ondřej Pavel | C | 39 | 6 | 9 | 15 | 34 |
| Lucas Sowder | LW | 25 | 5 | 9 | 14 | 8 |
| Josh Groll | F | 30 | 5 | 6 | 11 | 8 |
| Adam Eisele | F | 33 | 4 | 6 | 10 | 6 |
| Zach Krajnik | C | 34 | 4 | 6 | 10 | 14 |
| Steven Bellini | D | 39 | 1 | 8 | 9 | 8 |
| Sam Morton | F | 10 | 6 | 2 | 8 | 2 |
| Will Hillman | F | 35 | 4 | 4 | 8 | 4 |
| Luc Wilson | F | 21 | 1 | 6 | 7 | 8 |
| Tony Malinowski | D | 37 | 1 | 5 | 6 | 4 |
| Simon Tassy | F | 15 | 1 | 4 | 5 | 0 |
| Mason Wheeler | D | 37 | 0 | 5 | 5 | 14 |
| Connor Gregga | F | 23 | 2 | 2 | 4 | 6 |
| Tanner Edwards | C/LW | 10 | 1 | 1 | 2 | 4 |
| Campbell Cichosz | D | 36 | 0 | 2 | 2 | 6 |
| Brenden Olson | F | 7 | 1 | 0 | 1 | 4 |
| Alex Tracy | G | 10 | 0 | 0 | 0 | 0 |
| Keenan Rancier | G | 30 | 0 | 0 | 0 | 0 |
| Total | | | 126 | 223 | 349 | 287 |

== Goaltending statistics ==
| Name | Games | Minutes | Wins | Losses | Ties | Goals against | Saves | Shut outs | SV % | GAA |
|---|---|---|---|---|---|---|---|---|---|---|
| Keenan Rancier | 33 | 1777:39 | 19 | 10 | 1 | 55 | 587 | 1 | .914 | 1.86 |
| Alex Tracy | 10 | 562:06 | 6 | 3 | 0 | 21 | 153 | 1 | .879 | 2.24 |
| Empty Net | - | 27:13 | - | - | - | 5 | - | - | - | - |
| Total | 39 | 2366:58 | 25 | 13 | 1 | 81 | 740 | 2 | .901 | 2.05 |

== Rankings ==
| Poll | Week | | | | | | | | | | | | | | | | | | | | | | | | | | | |
| Poll | Pre | 1 | 2 | 3 | 4 | 5 | 6 | 7 | 8 | 9 | 10 | 11 | 12 | 13 | 14 | 15 | 16 | 17 | 18 | 19 | 20 | 21 | 22 | 23 | 24 | 25 | 26 | 27 (Final) |
|---|---|---|---|---|---|---|---|---|---|---|---|---|---|---|---|---|---|---|---|---|---|---|---|---|---|---|---|---|
| USCHO.com | 3 (3) | - | 5 | 5 | 2 (14) | 8 | 6 | 6 | 8 | 10 | 11 | 16 | 16 | - | 19 | 17т | 17 | 14 | 13 | 14 | 13 | 12 | 13 | 13 | 12 | 10 | - | 12 |
| USA Today | 3 (2) | 3 (2) | 5 | 5 | 2 (8) | 8 | 7 | 6 | 7 | 10 | 13 | 16 | 16 | 19 | NR | 19 | 17 | 14 | 13 | 13 | 12 | 12 | 12 | 12 | 12 | 9 | 12 | 11 |

Note: USCHO did not release a poll in weeks 1, 13 or 26.

== Awards and honors ==
| Player | Award | Ref |
|---|---|---|
| Jake Livingstone | AHCA West All-American Second Team | |
| David Silye | CCHA Forward of the Year | |
| Jake Livingstone | CCHA Defenseman of the Year | |
| Jake Livingstone | CCHA First Team | |
| David Silye | CCHA First Team | |
| Akito Hirose | CCHA Second Team | |
