= 2022–23 CCHA season =

- Season: 2022–23
- Conference: CCHA
- Division: Division I
- Sport: ice hockey
- Duration: October 1, 2022– February 25, 2023
- Number of teams: 8
- TV partner(s): FloSports

Regular season
- Season champions: Minnesota State
- Season MVP: Blake Pietila
- Top scorer: Austen Swankler

CCHA tournament
- Tournament champions: Minnesota State
- Runners-up: Northern Michigan
- Top scorer: Christian Fitzgerald (9)

NCAA tournament
- Bids: 2
- Record: 0–2
- Best Finish: Regional Semifinal
- Team(s): Michigan Tech; Minnesota State

The 2022–23 CCHA season was the 44th season of play for the Central Collegiate Hockey Association and was part of the 2022–23 NCAA Division I men's ice hockey season. The regular season began on October 1, 2022, and concluded on February 25, 2023. The conference tournament began on March 3.

== Coaches ==
=== Records ===
Team	Head coach	Season at school	Record at school	CCHA record
Bemidji State	Tom Serratore	22	354–327–92	14–12–0
Bowling Green	Ty Eigner	4	56–42–8	11–14–1
Ferris State	Bob Daniels	31	473–562–108	256–293–73
Lake Superior State	Damon Whitten	9	117–151–28	13–13–0
Michigan Tech	Joe Shawhan	6	95–77–16	16–8–2
Minnesota State	Mike Hastings	11	274–96–24	23–3–0
Northern Michigan	Grant Potulny	6	95–80–11	12–13–1
St. Thomas	Enrico Blasi	2	3–32–1	3–22–1

== Standings ==
2022–23 Central Collegiate Hockey Association Standings
	Conference record										Overall record					
	GP	W	L	T	OTW	OTL	SW	PTS	GF	GA	GP	W	L	T	GF	GA
#12 Minnesota State †*	26	16	9	1	2	4	1	52	83	56	39	25	13	1	126	81
#13 Michigan Tech	26	15	7	4	0	1	0	50	68	54	39	24	11	4	103	88
Bowling Green	26	12	12	2	0	2	1	41	89	76	36	15	19	2	114	114
Northern Michigan	26	14	12	0	3	0	0	39	82	77	38	21	17	0	123	103
Bemidji State	26	12	11	3	3	1	2	39	73	63	36	14	17	5	94	97
Ferris State	26	9	14	3	1	2	3	34	62	91	37	14	19	4	92	131
St. Thomas	26	10	14	2	1	1	0	32	69	81	36	11	23	2	86	117
Lake Superior State	26	8	17	1	2	1	1	25	52	80	36	9	25	2	71	118
Championship: March 18, 2023 † indicates conference regular season champion (MacNaughton Cup) * indicates conference tournament champion (Mason Cup); Rankings: USCHO.com Top 20 Poll

== Non-Conference record ==
Of the sixteen teams that are selected to participate in the NCAA tournament, ten will be via at-large bids. Those 10 teams are determined based upon the PairWise rankings. The rankings take into account all games played but are heavily affected by intra-conference results. The result is that teams from leagues which perform better in non-conference are much more likely to receive at-large bids even if they possess inferior records overall.

The CCHA had a poor season in non-conference play. Just two teams finished with a winning record while half of the conference produced just 6 wins in a total of 31 games. The CCHA produced a winning record against just one other conference (ECAC) as well as the independent programs, however, many of those victories came against low-ranking opponents and only minimally improved the CCHA's standing.

=== Regular season record ===
Team	Atlantic Hockey	Big Ten	ECAC Hockey	Hockey East	Independent	NCHC	Total
Bemidji State	0–0–0	0–0–0	0–0–0	0–0–0	1–1–0	1–3–2	2–4–2
Bowling Green	0–0–0	1–3–0	2–0–0	0–0–0	0–0–0	0–2–0	3–5–0
Ferris State	1–1–0	1–0–0	0–0–0	0–0–0	0–0–0	0–3–1	2–4–1
Lake Superior State	0–0–0	0–3–0	1–1–0	0–1–0	0–0–0	0–1–1	1–6–1
Michigan Tech	0–0–0	1–0–0	2–0–0	1–0–0	3–0–0	0–1–0	7–1–0
Minnesota State	0–0–0	1–1–0	0–0–0	0–0–0	2–0–0	2–2–0	5–3–0
Northern Michigan	0–0–0	0–2–0	2–0–0	0–0–0	2–2–0	0–0–0	4–4–0
St. Thomas	0–0–0	0–2–0	0–0–0	0–0–0	1–3–0	0–2–0	1–7–0
Overall	1–1–0	4–11–0	7–1–0	1–1–0	9–6–0	3–14–4	25–34–4

== Statistics ==
=== Leading scorers ===
GP = Games played; G = Goals; A = Assists; Pts = Points; PIM = Penalty minutes

Player	Class	Team	GP	G	A	Pts	PIM
Austen Swankler	Sophomore	Bowling Green	26	13	19	32	37
David Silye	Junior	Minnesota State	26	19	10	29	4
André Ghantous	Senior	Northern Michigan	26	9	17	26	30
Artem Shlaine	Junior	Northern Michigan	26	7	18	25	14
Lleyton Roed	Freshman	Bemidji State	25	12	13	25	6
Nathan Burke	Senior	Bowling Green	26	15	9	24	12
Chase Gresock	Senior	Bowling Green	26	8	14	22	6
Jake Livingstone	Junior	Minnesota State	26	5	17	22	26
Elias Rosén	Senior	Bemidji State	26	4	17	21	12
Ryan Sandelin	Senior	Minnesota State	25	9	12	21	33

=== Leading goaltenders ===
Minimum 1/3 of team's minutes played in conference games.
GP = Games played; Min = Minutes played; W = Wins; L = Losses; T = Ties; GA = Goals against; SO = Shutouts; SV% = Save percentage; GAA = Goals against average

Player	Class	Team	GP	Min	W	L	T	GA	SO	SV%	GAA
Keenan Rancier	Sophomore	Minnesota State	21	1185:06	12	7	1	37	0	.908	1.87
Blake Pietila	Senior	Michigan Tech	24	1425:48	14	7	3	48	6	.929	2.02
Mattias Scholl	Sophomore	Bemidji State	24	1412:23	10	10	3	52	1	.910	2.21
Béni Halász	Freshman	Northern Michigan	24	1302:41	13	10	0	55	2	.910	2.53
Christian Stoever	Sophomore	Bowling Green	23	1362:40	9	12	2	60	1	.918	2.64

== CCHA Tournament ==
Teams are reseeded for the semifinals

Quarterfinals; March 3–5
1	Minnesota State	6	2	–
8	Lake Superior State	1	1	–
2	Michigan Tech	1	5	–
7	St. Thomas	0	4	–
3	Bowling Green	3	1	–
6	Ferris State	4*	2*	–
4	Northern Michigan	7	2*	–
5	Bemidji State	3	1	–

Semifinals; March 11
1	Minnesota State	7
6	Ferris State	2
2	Michigan Tech	0
4	Northern Michigan	4

Championship; March 18
1	Minnesota State	3*
4	Northern Michigan	2

Note: * denotes overtime period(s)

== NCAA tournament ==
=== Regional semifinal ===
==== West ====
March 23, 2023; 4:00 PM	(2) St. Cloud State	4 – 0 (0–0, 2–0, 2–0)	(3) Minnesota State	Scheels Arena; Attendance: 5,061

Game reference

Jaxon Castor
Goalies
Keenan Rancier
Referees:
Cameron Lynch
Chris Pitoscia
Linesmen:
Adam Wood
Stephen Drain

(Cruikshank, Ingram) Veeti Miettinen (12) – PP GW – 32:30	1–0
(Rogers, Ahcan) Jack Peart (3) – 37:23	2–0
(Spellacy, Miettinen) Zach Okabe (18) – 53:03	3–0
(Miller) Grant Cruikshank (23) – EN – 56:44	4–0

8 min
Penalties
6 min
21
Shots
34

==== Midwest ====
March 24, 2023; 5:00 PM	(2) Penn State	8 – 0 (1–0, 3–0, 4–0)	(3) Michigan Tech	PPL Center; Attendance: 7,067

Game reference

Liam Soulière
Goalies
Blake Pietila
Referees:
CJ Hanafin
Joe Carusone
Linesmen:
Ryan Knapp
Patrick Dapuzzo

(Crespo, Dowd) Tyler Paquette (7) – GW – 02:12	1–0
(Schade) Jarod Crespo (3) – 24:34	2–0
(Mack, Linden) Ashton Calder (10) – 34:46	3–0
(Kirwan, Sarlo) Christian Berger (5) – 38:45	4–0
(MacEachern, Schade) Kevin Wall (17) – 43:01	5–0
(unassisted) Chase McLane (2) – 47:31	6–0
(MacEachern, DeNaples) Connor McMenamin (9) – 54:20	7–0
(Wall) Ryan Kirwan (8) – 54:53	8–0

4 min
Penalties
2 min
39
Shots
24

== Ranking ==
=== USCHO ===
Team	Pre	1	2	3	4	5	6	7	8	9	10	11	12	13	14	15	16	17	18	19	20	21	22	23	24	25	26	Final
Bemidji State	NR	-	NR	NR	NR	NR	20	NR	NR	NR	NR	NR	NR	-	NR	NR	NR	NR	NR	NR	NR	NR	NR	NR	NR	NR	-	NR
Bowling Green	NR	-	NR	NR	NR	NR	NR	NR	NR	NR	NR	NR	NR	-	NR	NR	NR	NR	NR	NR	NR	NR	NR	NR	NR	NR	-	NR
Ferris State	NR	-	NR	NR	NR	NR	NR	NR	NR	NR	NR	NR	NR	-	NR	NR	NR	NR	NR	NR	NR	NR	NR	NR	NR	NR	-	NR
Lake Superior State	NR	-	NR	NR	NR	NR	NR	NR	NR	NR	NR	NR	NR	-	NR	NR	NR	NR	NR	NR	NR	NR	NR	NR	NR	NR	-	NR
Michigan Tech	20	-	NR	NR	NR	NR	NR	NR	NR	NR	19	18	17	-	16	13	14	13	12	12	12	11	11	10	13	13	-	13
Minnesota State	3	-	5	5	2	8	6	6	8	10	11	16	16	-	19	17	17	14	13	14	13	12	13	13	12	10	-	12
Northern Michigan	NR	-	NR	NR	NR	NR	NR	NR	NR	NR	NR	NR	NR	-	NR	NR	NR	NR	NR	NR	NR	NR	NR	NR	NR	NR	-	NR
St. Thomas	NR	-	NR	NR	NR	NR	NR	NR	NR	NR	NR	NR	NR	-	NR	NR	NR	NR	NR	NR	NR	NR	NR	NR	NR	NR	-	NR

=== USA Today ===
Team	Pre	1	2	3	4	5	6	7	8	9	10	11	12	13	14	15	16	17	18	19	20	21	22	23	24	25	26	Final
Bemidji State	NR	NR	NR	NR	NR	NR	NR	20	NR	NR	NR	NR	NR	NR	20	NR	NR	NR	NR	NR	NR	NR	NR	NR	NR	NR	NR	NR
Bowling Green	NR	NR	NR	NR	NR	NR	NR	NR	NR	NR	NR	NR	NR	NR	NR	NR	NR	NR	NR	NR	NR	NR	NR	NR	NR	NR	NR	NR
Ferris State	NR	NR	NR	NR	NR	NR	NR	NR	NR	NR	NR	NR	NR	NR	NR	NR	NR	NR	NR	NR	NR	NR	NR	NR	NR	NR	NR	NR
Lake Superior State	NR	NR	NR	NR	NR	NR	NR	NR	NR	NR	NR	NR	NR	NR	NR	NR	NR	NR	NR	NR	NR	NR	NR	NR	NR	NR	NR	NR
Michigan Tech	NR	NR	20	NR	NR	NR	NR	NR	NR	20	18	18	17	16	16	13	14	13	12	12	13	11	11	10	13	13	13	13
Minnesota State	3	3	5	5	2	8	7	6	7	10	13	16	16	18	NR	18	17	14	13	13	12	12	12	12	12	9	12	11
Northern Michigan	20	20	NR	20	NR	NR	NR	NR	NR	NR	NR	NR	NR	NR	NR	NR	NR	NR	NR	NR	NR	NR	NR	NR	NR	NR	NR	NR
St. Thomas	NR	NR	NR	NR	NR	NR	NR	NR	NR	NR	NR	NR	NR	NR	NR	NR	NR	NR	NR	NR	NR	NR	NR	NR	NR	NR	NR	NR

=== Pairwise ===
Team	2	3	4	5	6	7	8	9	10	11	12	14	15	16	17	18	19	20	21	22	23	24	Final
Bemidji State	22	48	54	30	14	24	25	25	28	24	24	19	21	28	27	28	32	30	27	34	34	32	34
Bowling Green	9	13	37	32	36	33	25	27	28	23	27	30	30	24	26	26	27	26	27	31	38	39	39
Ferris State	19	23	32	22	34	37	39	40	43	31	38	33	35	32	36	42	31	33	41	42	37	38	38
Lake Superior State	22	50	55	55	52	57	55	53	56	58	57	58	61	60	60	59	58	59	59	58	57	57	57
Michigan Tech	22	44	32	29	12	17	21	18	15	16	16	20	17	12	12	11	10	12	11	11	11	10	10
Minnesota State	22	31	6	25	22	13	14	15	17	27	20	24	18	14	14	13	13	13	12	15	12	13	10
Northern Michigan	21	24	39	33	41	29	24	22	27	32	36	31	43	39	36	42	42	43	37	29	28	26	26
St. Thomas	22	38	50	49	42	47	51	49	47	46	47	46	47	46	45	45	46	47	46	47	49	50	49

Note: teams ranked in the top-10 automatically qualify for the NCAA tournament. Teams ranked 11-16 can qualify based upon conference tournament results.

== Awards ==
=== NCAA ===
AHCA West All-American First Team
Player	Position	Team
Blake Pietila	G	Michigan Tech
AHCA West All-American Second Team
Jake Livingstone	D	Minnesota State

=== CCHA ===
Award		Recipient
Player of the Year		Blake Pietila, Michigan Tech
Forward of the Year		David Silye, Minnesota State
Defenseman of the Year		Jake Livingstone, Minnesota State
Goaltender of the Year		Blake Pietila, Michigan Tech
Rookie of the Year		Kyle Kukkonen, Michigan Tech
Coach of the Year		Joe Shawhan, Michigan Tech
All-CCHA Teams
First Team	Position	Second Team
Blake Pietila, Michigan Tech	G	Mattias Sholl, Bemidji State
Jake Livingstone, Minnesota State	D	Akito Hirose, Minnesota State
Elias Rosén, Bemidji State	D	Brett Thorne, Michigan Tech
Ryland Mosley, Michigan Tech	F	Louis Boudon, Lake Superior State
David Silye, Minnesota State	F	Nathan Burke, Bowling Green
Austen Swankler, Bowling Green	F	André Ghantous, Northern Michigan
Rookie Team	Position	
Béni Halász, Northern Michigan	G	
Dalton Norris, Bowling Green	D	
Josh Zinger, Northern Michigan	D	
Kyle Kukkonen, Michigan Tech	F	
Joey Larson, Northern Michigan	F	
Lleyton Roed, Bemidji State	F	

== 2023 NHL entry draft ==
Round	Pick	Player	College	NHL team
4	118	Hampton Slukynsky ^{†}	Northern Michigan	Los Angeles Kings
5	132	Eric Pohlkamp ^{†}	Bemidji State	San Jose Sharks
5	154	Chase Cheslock ^{†}	St. Thomas	New Jersey Devils

† incoming freshman
