= 2023 CCHA men's ice hockey tournament =

- Dates: March 3–18, 2023
- Teams: 8
- Finals site: Mayo Clinic Health System Event Center; Mankato, Minnesota
- Champions: Minnesota State (2nd title)
- Winning coach: Mike Hastings (2nd title)
- CCHA men's Ice Hockey Tournaments

The 2023 CCHA Men's Ice Hockey Tournament was the 44th tournament in the history of the men's Central Collegiate Hockey Association. It began on March 3 and ended on March 18, 2023. All games were played at home campus sites. Minnesota State won the tournament and received the CCHA's automatic bid for the 2023 NCAA Division I Men's Ice Hockey Tournament.

== Format ==
The first round of the postseason tournament features a best-of-three games format, while the semifinals and final are single games held at the campus sites of the highest remaining seeds. All eight conference teams participated in the tournament. Teams are seeded No. 1 through No. 8 according to their final conference standings, with a tiebreaker system used to seed teams with an identical number of points accumulated. The higher-seeded teams each earned home ice and hosted one of the lower-seeded teams. The teams that advance out of the quarterfinals are reseeded according to the regular season standings. The semifinals and final are single-elimination games. The winners of the semifinals play one another to determine the conference tournament champion.

== Conference standings ==
2022–23 Central Collegiate Hockey Association Standings
	Conference record										Overall record					
	GP	W	L	T	OTW	OTL	SW	PTS	GF	GA	GP	W	L	T	GF	GA
#12 Minnesota State †*	26	16	9	1	2	4	1	52	83	56	39	25	13	1	126	81
#13 Michigan Tech	26	15	7	4	0	1	0	50	68	54	39	24	11	4	103	88
Bowling Green	26	12	12	2	0	2	1	41	89	76	36	15	19	2	114	114
Northern Michigan	26	14	12	0	3	0	0	39	82	77	38	21	17	0	123	103
Bemidji State	26	12	11	3	3	1	2	39	73	63	36	14	17	5	94	97
Ferris State	26	9	14	3	1	2	3	34	62	91	37	14	19	4	92	131
St. Thomas	26	10	14	2	1	1	0	32	69	81	36	11	23	2	86	117
Lake Superior State	26	8	17	1	2	1	1	25	52	80	36	9	25	2	71	118
Championship: March 18, 2023 † indicates conference regular season champion (MacNaughton Cup) * indicates conference tournament champion (Mason Cup); Rankings: USCHO.com Top 20 Poll

== Bracket ==
Teams are reseeded for the semifinals

Quarterfinals; March 3–5
1	Minnesota State	6	2	–
8	Lake Superior State	1	1	–
2	Michigan Tech	1	5	–
7	St. Thomas	0	4	–
3	Bowling Green	3	1	–
6	Ferris State	4*	2*	–
4	Northern Michigan	7	2*	–
5	Bemidji State	3	1	–

Semifinals; March 11
1	Minnesota State	7
6	Ferris State	2
2	Michigan Tech	0
4	Northern Michigan	4

Championship; March 18
1	Minnesota State	3*
4	Northern Michigan	2

Note: * denotes overtime period(s)

== Results ==
Note: All game times are local.

=== Quarterfinals ===
==== (1) Minnesota State vs. (8) Lake Superior State ====
March 3, 2023; 7:07 PM	Minnesota State	6–1 (2–0, 1–1, 3–0)	Lake Superior State	Mayo Clinic Health System Event Center; Attendance: 3,948

Game reference

Keenan Rancier
Goalies
Ethan Langenegger
Referees:
Stephen McInchak
Rick Nelson
Linesmen:
Matt Tyree
Eric Standke

(Carroll) – David Silye – 03:13	1–0
(Bellini, Furry) – Andy Carroll – PP, GW – 10:38	2–0
	2–1	22:14 – Brandon Puricelli (Borshyov, Boudon)
(Fitzgerald, Silye) – Akito Hirose – PP – 22:58	3–1
(Fitzgerald, Pavel) – Zach Krajnik	4–1
(Eisele) – Simon Tassy – 46:14	5–1
(unassisted) Christian Fitzgerald – 50:51	6–1

9 min
Penalties
10 min
32
Shots
18

March 4, 2023; 6:07 PM	Minnesota State	2–1 (0–0, 1–1, 1–0)	Lake Superior State	Mayo Clinic Health System Event Center; Attendance: 3,798

Game reference

Keenan Rancier
Goalies
Seth Eisele
Ethan Langenegger
Referees:
Stephen McInchak
Rick Nelson
Linesmen:
Matt Tyree
Eric Standke

(Livingstone, Hirose) Christian Fitzgerald – PP – 28:30	1–0
	1–1	30:31 – Jack Jeffers (Tritt)
(Livingstone, Fitzgerald) Ryan Sandelin – GW, PP – 58:43	2–1

4 min
Penalties
8 min
40
Shots
18

Minnesota State wins series 2–0

==== (2) Michigan Tech vs. (7) St. Thomas ====
March 3, 2023; 7:07 PM	Michigan Tech	1–0 (0–0, 0–0, 1–0)	St. Thomas	MacInnes Student Ice Arena; Attendance: 2,338

Game reference
Blake Pietila	Goalies	Aaron Trotter	Referees: Scott Roth; Michael Forys; Linesmen: Tyler Landman; Nathan Voll
(J. Pietila, Kukkonen) Brett Thorne – GW – 51:28 / 1–0			Referees: Scott Roth; Michael Forys; Linesmen: Tyler Landman; Nathan Voll
10 min	Penalties	8 min	Referees: Scott Roth; Michael Forys; Linesmen: Tyler Landman; Nathan Voll
32	Shots	30	Referees: Scott Roth; Michael Forys; Linesmen: Tyler Landman; Nathan Voll

March 4, 2023; 6:07 PM	Michigan Tech	5–4 (3–1, 1–1, 1–2)	St. Thomas	MacInnes Student Ice Arena; Attendance: 2,587

Game reference

Blake Pietila
Goalies
Aaron Trotter
Referees:
Scott Roth
Micheal Froys
Linesmen:
Tyler Landman
Nathan Voll

	0–1	08:25 – Mack Byers (Braccini)
(Orr, Lipe) Tristan Ashbrook – 09:36	1–1
(J. Pietila, Ashbrook) Jack Works – 17:32	2–1
(Saretsky, O'Connell) Tristan Ashbrook – 19:41	3–1
(L. Pietila, J. Pietila) Kyle Kukkonen – SH – 38:12	4–1
	4–2	39:18 – PP – Luc Laylin (Recchi)
(J. Pietila, Crespi) Kyle Kukkonen – GW – 47:49	5–2
	5–3	49:22 – Matthew Jennings (Pepper)
	5–4	58:51 – PP – Mack Byers (Braccini, Lee)

13 min
Penalties
8 min
34
Shots
34

Michigan Tech wins series 2–0

==== (3) Bowling Green vs. (6) Ferris State ====
March 3, 2023; 7:07 PM	Bowling Green	3–4 (OT) (2–1, 0–1, 1–1, 0–1)	Ferris State	Slater Family Ice Arena; Attendance: 1,686

Game reference

Christian Stoever
Goalies
Noah Giesbrecht
Referees:
Derek Berkebile
Brady Johnson
Linesmen:
Kyle Bushee
Pat Giles

(Burke) Dalton Norris – PP – 04:44	1–0
(Gresock, O'Hara) Austen Swankler – 08:49	2–0
	2–1	17:22 – Jacob Badal (Schleppe, Cooper)
	2–2	20:29 – Jason Brancheau (MacLaren, Venuto)
	2–3	54:54 – Travis Shoudy (Marek)
(Burke, Vinnell) Taylor Schneider – 58:38	3–3
	3–4	74:04 – GW – Nick Nardecchia (Schultheis, Deelstra)

14 min
Penalties
14 min
42
Shots
40

March 4, 2023; 7:07 PM	Bowling Green	1–2 (OT) (0–0, 0–0, 1–1, 0–1)	Ferris State	Slater Family Ice Arena; Attendance: 1,638

Game reference

Christian Stoever
Goalies
Noah Giesbrecht
Referees:
Derek Berkebile
Brady Johnson
Linesmen:
Kyle Bushee
Pat Giles

	0–1	47:13 – Brenden MacLaren (Dirks, Slick)
(Swankler, Vinnell) Chase Gresock – 58:43	1–1
	1–2	64:04 – GW – Jason Brancheau (Venuto)

6 min
Penalties
14 min
33
Shots
30

Ferris State wins series 2–0

==== (4) Northern Michigan vs. (5) Bemidji State ====
March 3, 2023; 7:07 PM	Northern Michigan	7–3 (2–2, 1–0, 4–1)	Bemidji State	Berry Events Center; Attendance: 3,116

Game reference

Béni Halász
Goalies
Mattias Sholl
Referees:
Bruce Vida Jr
TJ Likens
Linesmen:
Jamie Grace
Eric Froberg

	0–1	04:35 – Kyle Looft (Corcoran, Martan)
(Vanderbeck, Funk) Rylan Van Unen – 11:36	1–1
(Shlaine, Papp) Joey Larson – 12:13	2–1
	2–2	13:20 – Carter Jones (unassisted)
(Enns, Vescio) Michael Colella – 36:59	3–2
	3–3	46:32 – Ross Armour (Pickering, Roed)
(Shlaine, Ghantous) Joey Larson – PP, GW – 49:43	4–3
(Ghantous, Kjellberg) Michael Colella – 50:47	5–3
(Eddy) Andre Ghantous – 56:04	6–3
(Frye, Keefer) Michael Van Unen – EN – 57:09	7–3

6 min
Penalties
6 min
24
Shots
31

March 4, 2023; 6:07 PM	Northern Michigan	2–1 (OT) (0–0, 1–1, 0–0, 1–0)	Bemidji State	Berry Events Center; Attendance: 2,269

Game reference

Béni Halász
Goalies
Mattias Sholl
Referees:
Bruce Vida Jr
TJ Likens
Linesmen:
Jamie Grace
Eric Froberg

(M. Van Unen, Vanderbeck) Alex Frye – 30:00	1–0
	1–1	36:16 – PP – Ross Armour (Jones, Zmolek)
(Papp, Enns) David Keefer – GW – 61:07	2–1

12 min
Penalties
6 min
23
Shots
36

Northern Michigan wins series 2–0

=== Semifinals ===
==== (1) Minnesota State vs. (6) Ferris State ====
March 11, 2023; 6:07 PM	Minnesota State	7–2 (2–1, 2–1, 3–0)	Ferris State	Mayo Clinic Health System Event Center; Attendance: 4,468

Game reference

Keenan Rancier
Goalies
Noah Giesbrecht
Referees:
Scott Roth
Michael Forys
Linesmen:
Nathan Voll
Tyler Landman

	0–1	15:32 – Connor McGrath (Marek, Slick)
(Silye, Sandelin) Christian Fitzgerald – 18:32	1–1
(Livingstone, Fitzgerald) David Silye – PP – 19:00	2–1
(Sowder, Carroll) Brendan Furry – GW, PP – 23:27	3–1
(Sowder, Furry) Cade Borchardt – 29:07	4–1
	4–2	30:51 – PP – Stepan Pokorny (Slick, Brancheau)
(Livingstone) Ondrej Pavel – 52:17	5–2
(Furry, Livingstone) Lucas Sowder - 55:14	6–2
(Sandelin, Fitzgerald ) Jake Livingstone – PP – 56:42	7–2

4 min
Penalties
8 min
39
Shots
21

==== (2) Michigan Tech vs. (4) Northern Michigan ====
March 11, 2023; 6:07 PM	Michigan Tech	0–4 (0–3, 0–0, 0–1)	Northern Michigan	MacInnes Student Ice Arena; Attendance: 3,930

Game reference

Blake Pietila
Goalies
Béni Halász
Referees:
TJ Likens
Brude Vida
Linesmen:
Matt Tyree
Eric Standke

0–1	04:44 - GW – Rylan Van Unen (unassisted)
0–2	07:45 – PP – Andre Ghantous (Larson, Zinger)
0–3	11:07 – Michael Van Unen (unassisted)
0–4	58:00 – EN – Simon Kjellberg (unassisted)

10 min
Penalties
10 min
44
Shots
25

=== Championship ===
==== (1) Minnesota State vs. (4) Northern Michigan ====
March 18, 2023; 6:07 PM	Minnesota State	3–2 (OT) (0–0, 0–1, 2–1, 1-0)	Northern Michigan	Mayo Clinic Health System Event Center; Attendance: 4,805

Game reference

Keenan Rancier
Goalies
Béni Halász
Referees:
Scott Roth
Michael Forys
Linesmen:
Nathan Voll
Tyler Landman

	0–1	36:21 – Alex Frye (Keefer)
	0–2	47:27 – Alex Frye (Gallacher, Vescio)
(Tassy, Carroll) Ondrej Pavel – 57:41	1–2
(Livingstone, Furry) Christian Fitzgerald – 59:02	2–2
(Borchardt) Zach Krajnik – GW – 61:08	3–2

4 min
Penalties
10 min
33
Shots
25
