= 2022–23 Northern Michigan Wildcats men's ice hockey season =

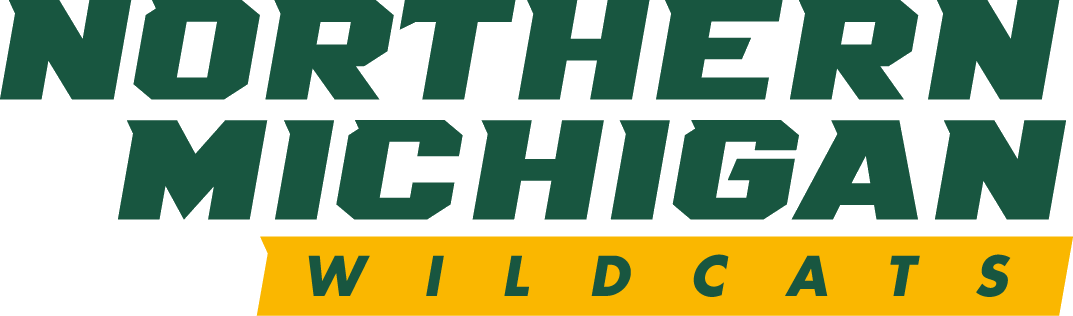
- Conference: T–4th CCHA
- Home ice: Berry Events Center

Rankings
- USCHO: NR
- USA Today: NR

Record
- Overall: 21–17–0
- Conference: 14–12–0
- Home: 10–8–0
- Road: 11–9–0

Coaches and captains
- Head coach: Grant Potulny
- Assistant coaches: Byron Pool; Nick Peruzzi
- Captain: Tanner Vescio
- Alternate captain(s): André Ghantous; David Keefer

The 2022–23 Northern Michigan Wildcats men's ice hockey season was the 47th season of play for the program and 25th season in the CCHA. The Wildcats represented Northern Michigan University in the 2022–23 NCAA Division I men's ice hockey season. They were coached by Grant Potulny, in his 6th season, and played their home games at Berry Events Center.

== Season ==
After a solid season the year before, Northern Michigan came into the season ranked for the first time in years and had some decent results early. The Wildcats slipped at the end of October, however, losing 4 out of 5 games which included a loss to Alaska Anchorage who were playing their first games in almost 3 years. NMU arrested their slide in November in part by sticking with freshman netminder Béni Halász in goal. The other issue for the club was trying to reform the offense after the loss of Hank Crone, their leading scorer from the year before. Slowly, the team got used to one another and the new additions were assimilated into coach Potulny's system.

Northern Michigan finished out the first half of their season with a decent record which included splits against both Minnesota State and Michigan Tech. Unfortunately, after returning from the winter break, both the offense and defense struggled. The Wildcats lost 6 out of 7 and tumbled down the standings. By the time February rolled around, the team was in the bottom half of the CCHA standings and had no chance for an at-large bid to the NCAA tournament. Luckily, the Wildcats ended the season with a fairly easy slate of opponents and were able to take full advantage.

After settling down on the back end, the NMU offense exploded against Ferris State, scoring 17 goals in one weekend. Entering the final week of the season, the suddenly-hot Wildcats had a long-shot chance at a homestand in the postseason. First, they needed to take as many points as they could from Bowling Green. The team had to overcome early deficits in both matches but were able to come away with a pair of 4–2 victories. In the meantime, Bemidji State was only able to earn a split and the two teams ended the regular season with 39 points. Luckily for NMU, the Wildcats possessed the tiebreaker and would host the Beavers for the quarterfinal round.

Northern Michigan's inspired play continued into the postseason and, after trading goals with BSU, the Wildcats scored the final 4 with goals from Joey Larson, Mikey Colella, Andre Ghantous, and Michael Van Unen to walk away with a win in game 1. Bemidji State responded with a strong effort in the rematch but Halász was equal to the task and allowed just one goal on 36 shots. Regulation ended with a 1–1 tie and immediately after the start of overtime the Wildcats were in attack mode. NMU fired three shots on goal in 67 seconds with David Keefer finding the twine. Northern Michigan advanced to the semifinal where they met long-time rival, Michigan Tech. NMU entered the match having lost the last three to the Huskies but erased that memory by scoring three times in the first thanks to Michael Van Unen, Andre Ghantous, and Rylan Van Unen. After that, Halász had to weather a barrage of shots from Tech but he was up to the task and turned everything aside. A late goal by New York Rangers prospect Simon Kjellberg extended their lead but by then the game was well in hand and Northern Michigan skated away with a 4–0 victory.

The Wilcdats reached a conference championship game for the third time under Potulny but were still searching for their first NCAA tournament appearance since 2010. Halász continued his shutout streak and held Minnesota State scoreless through most of the game. Alex Frye scored a pair of goals to stake the Wildcats to a 2–0 lead and all signs were pointing to their winning the title. With less than 3 minutes remaining, everything began to unravel when Ondrej Pavel and the Mavericks cut the lead in half while their goaltender was pulled. MSU Forward Christian Fitzgerald completed the comeback with their second extra-attacker goal with less than a minute left in regulation. Now, with all of the momentum having swung towards the Mavericks, NMU could only watch as Minnesota State went on the attack in overtime and Zach Krajnik ended the Wildcats season after just 68 seconds.

== Departures ==
Player	Position	Nationality	Cause
Mack Byers	Forward	United States	Transferred to St. Thomas
Trevor Cosgrove	Defenseman	United States	Graduation (signed with Bridgeport Islanders)
Hank Crone	Forward	United States	Graduation (signed with Allen Americans)
Hampus Eriksson	Forward	Sweden	Graduation (signed with Pioneers Vorarlberg)
Tim Erkkila	Defenseman	United States	Left program (retired)
Oscar Geschwind	Forward	Sweden	Transferred to American International
Bo Hanson	Defenseman	United States	Graduation (signed with Wheeling Nailers)
Nolan Kent	Goaltender	Canada	Graduate transfer to Alaska Anchorage
Garrett Klee	Forward	United States	Graduation (signed with Kansas City Mavericks)
Ian Malcolmson	Forward	United States	Left program (retired)
Connor Marritt	Forward	Canada	Transferred to Alaska Anchorage
Joseph Nardi	Forward	Canada	Graduation (signed with Manitoba Moose)
Ben Newhouse	Defenseman	United States	Graduation (signed with HC Pustertal Wölfe)

== Recruiting ==
Player	Position	Nationality	Age	Notes
Isack Bandu	Defenseman	Canada	21	Notre-Dame-de-l'Île-Perrot, QC
Nathan Butler	Forward	United States	20	Wylie, TX
Connor Eddy	Forward	Canada	20	Victoria, BC
Aiden Gallacher	Defenseman	United States	22	Rochester Hills, MI; transfer from Michigan State
Luke Gramer	Defenseman	United States	20	Moorhead, MN
Béni Halász	Goaltender	Hungary	21	Budapest, HUN
Simon Kjellberg	Defenseman	Sweden	22	Nashville, TN; transfer from Rensselaer; selected 163rd overall in 2018
Joey Larson	Forward	United States	21	Brighton, MI
Tanner Latsch	Forward	United States	20	Muskegon, MI
Zach Michaelis	Forward	United States	20	Elk River, MN
Kristóf Papp	Forward	Hungary	21	Budapest, HUN; transfer from Michigan State
Artem Shlaine	Forward	Russia	20	Moscow, RUS; transfer from Connecticut
Josh Zinger	Defenseman	Canada	21	Red Deer, AB

== Roster ==
As of September 8, 2022.

No.	Nat.	Player	Class	Pos	Height	Weight	DoB	Hometown	Previous team	NHL rights
2	(Sweden)	Simon Kjellberg	Senior	D	6' 3" (1.91 m)	210 lb (95 kg)	2000-02-17	Stockholm, Sweden	Rensselaer (ECAC)	NYR, 163rd overall 2018
4	(Canada)	Michael Van Unen	Senior	D	6' 1" (1.85 m)	190 lb (86 kg)	1999-02-26	Kamloops, British Columbia	Merritt Centennials (BCHL)	—
5	(United States)	Colby Enns	Senior	D	6' 2" (1.88 m)	201 lb (91 kg)	1999-09-16	Minot, North Dakota	Lincoln Stars (USHL)	—
6	(Canada)	Tyrell Boucher	Junior	D	6' 1" (1.85 m)	185 lb (84 kg)	1999-06-03	Nampa, Alberta	Cowichan Valley Capitals (BCHL)	—
7	(United States)	David Keefer (A)	Senior	F	5' 10" (1.78 m)	195 lb (88 kg)	1997-10-21	Brighton, Michigan	Michigan State (Big Ten)	—
8	(Russia)	Artem Shlaine	Junior	F	6' 1" (1.85 m)	188 lb (85 kg)	2002-03-07	Moscow, Russia	Connecticut (HEA)	NJD, 130th overall 2020
9	(United States)	Joey Larson	Freshman	F	6' 1" (1.85 m)	198 lb (90 kg)	2001-03-27	Brighton, Michigan	Muskegon Lumberjacks (USHL)	—
10	(United States)	Aiden Gallacher	Junior	D	6' 1" (1.85 m)	205 lb (93 kg)	2000-03-20	Rochester Hills, Michigan	Michigan State (Big Ten)	—
11	(United States)	André Ghantous (A)	Senior	F	5' 9" (1.75 m)	170 lb (77 kg)	1998-12-07	Glendale, California	Penticton Vees (BCHL)	—
12	(United States)	Tanner Latsch	Freshman	F	6' 2" (1.88 m)	190 lb (86 kg)	2002-01-02	Muskegon, Michigan	Des Moines Buccaneers (USHL)	—
13	(United States)	Mikey Colella	Junior	F	5' 7" (1.7 m)	155 lb (70 kg)	1999-06-12	Wenonah, New Jersey	Trail Smoke Eaters (BCHL)	—
14	(United States)	Vincent de Mey	Senior	F	6' 1" (1.85 m)	185 lb (84 kg)	1997-11-26	Los Angeles, California	Muskegon Lumberjacks (USHL)	—
15	(Canada)	Rylan Van Unen	Junior	F	6' 1" (1.85 m)	190 lb (86 kg)	1999-02-26	Kamloops, British Columbia	Merritt Centennials (BCHL)	—
16	(Hungary)	Kristóf Papp	Junior	F	5' 11" (1.8 m)	176 lb (80 kg)	2001-06-27	Budapest, Hungary	Michigan State (Big Ten)	—
17	(United States)	Luke Gramer	Freshman	D	5' 9" (1.75 m)	180 lb (82 kg)	2002-07-02	Moorhead, Minnesota	Fargo Force (USHL)	—
18	(United States)	Nathan Butler	Freshman	F	5' 10" (1.78 m)	165 lb (75 kg)	2002-01-16	Wylie, Texas	Corpus Christi IceRays (NAHL)	—
19	(United States)	A. J. Vanderbeck	Senior	F	5' 11" (1.8 m)	185 lb (84 kg)	1997-09-23	Monument, Colorado	Ohio State (Big Ten)	—
20	(Canada)	Josh Zinger	Freshman	D	5' 11" (1.8 m)	185 lb (84 kg)	2001-08-05	Red Deer, Alberta	Brooks Bandits (AJHL)	—
21	(Canada)	Connor Eddy	Freshman	F	6' 1" (1.85 m)	200 lb (91 kg)	2002-04-18	Victoria, British Columbia	Victoria Grizzlies (BCHL)	—
22	(United States)	Jett Jungels	Junior	F	5' 8" (1.73 m)	165 lb (75 kg)	2000-07-14	Edina, Minnesota	Edina High School (USHS–MN)	—
23	(United States)	Jakob Peterson	Sophomore	D	6' 3" (1.91 m)	172 lb (78 kg)	2002-04-18	Marquette, Michigan	Amarillo Wranglers (NAHL)	—
24	(Canada)	Isack Bandu	Freshman	D	6' 2" (1.88 m)	195 lb (88 kg)	2001-05-03	Montreal, Quebec	Victoria Grizzlies (BCHL)	—
25	(Canada)	Brett Willits	Junior	F	5' 10" (1.78 m)	174 lb (79 kg)	1999-03-16	London, Ontario	Chilliwack Chiefs (BCHL)	—
26	(United States)	Tanner Vescio (C)	Senior	D	6' 2" (1.88 m)	195 lb (88 kg)	1998-04-14	Blaine, Minnesota	Fargo Force (USHL)	—
27	(United States)	Zach Michaelis	Freshman	F	6' 1" (1.85 m)	203 lb (92 kg)	2002-05-30	Elk River, Minnesota	Trail Smoke Eaters (BCHL)	—
28	(United States)	Alex Frye	Senior	F	6' 0" (1.83 m)	190 lb (86 kg)	1998-07-27	Clarkston, Michigan	Alaska Anchorage (WCHA)	—
29	(Canada)	Reilly Funk	Freshman (RS)	F	6' 3" (1.91 m)	194 lb (88 kg)	2000-12-23	Portage, Manitoba	Youngstown Phantoms (USHL)	—
30	(Hungary)	Béni Halász	Freshman	G	5' 11" (1.8 m)	184 lb (83 kg)	2001-08-13	Budapest, Hungary	New Mexico Ice Wolves (NAHL)	—
31	(United States)	Charlie Glockner	Sophomore	G	6' 3" (1.91 m)	181 lb (82 kg)	2000-06-27	Minnetonka, Minnesota	Waterloo Black Hawks (USHL)	—
33	(United States)	Rico DiMatteo	Junior	G	6' 3" (1.91 m)	161 lb (73 kg)	2001-01-01	Brasher Falls, New York	Lone Star Brahmas (NAHL)	—

== Standings ==
2022–23 Central Collegiate Hockey Association Standings
	Conference record										Overall record					
	GP	W	L	T	OTW	OTL	SW	PTS	GF	GA	GP	W	L	T	GF	GA
#12 Minnesota State †*	26	16	9	1	2	4	1	52	83	56	39	25	13	1	126	81
#13 Michigan Tech	26	15	7	4	0	1	0	50	68	54	39	24	11	4	103	88
Bowling Green	26	12	12	2	0	2	1	41	89	76	36	15	19	2	114	114
Northern Michigan	26	14	12	0	3	0	0	39	82	77	38	21	17	0	123	103
Bemidji State	26	12	11	3	3	1	2	39	73	63	36	14	17	5	94	97
Ferris State	26	9	14	3	1	2	3	34	62	91	37	14	19	4	92	131
St. Thomas	26	10	14	2	1	1	0	32	69	81	36	11	23	2	86	117
Lake Superior State	26	8	17	1	2	1	1	25	52	80	36	9	25	2	71	118
Championship: March 18, 2023 † indicates conference regular season champion (MacNaughton Cup) * indicates conference tournament champion (Mason Cup); Rankings: USCHO.com Top 20 Poll

== Schedule and results ==
Date	Time	Opponent^{#}	Rank^{#}	Site	TV	Decision	Result	Attendance	Record
Regular Season
October 1	6:07 PM	Bowling Green		Berry Events Center • Marquette, Michigan	FloHockey	Glockner	L 4–6	2,967	0–1–0 (0–1–0)
October 2	6:07 PM	Bowling Green		Berry Events Center • Marquette, Michigan	FloHockey	Glockner	W 4–3 ^{OT}	2,064	1–1–0 (1–1–0)
October 7	7:00 PM	at Colgate*		Class of 1965 Arena • Hamilton, New York	ESPN+	Glockner	W 3–2	827	2–1–0
October 8	4:00 PM	at Colgate*		Class of 1965 Arena • Hamilton, New York	ESPN+	Halász	W 4–1	518	3–1–0
October 14	7:30 PM	at #14 Notre Dame*		Compton Family Ice Arena • Notre Dame, Indiana	Peacock	Halász	L 1–3	5,002	3–2–0
October 16	5:00 PM	at #14 Notre Dame*		Compton Family Ice Arena • Notre Dame, Indiana	Peacock	Halász	L 4–5	3,521	3–3–0
October 21	7:07 PM	Alaska Anchorage*		Berry Events Center • Marquette, Michigan	FloHockey	Halász	W 9–1	2,481	4–3–0
October 22	6:07 PM	Alaska Anchorage*		Berry Events Center • Marquette, Michigan	FloHockey	Halász	L 1–3	2,898	4–4–0
October 28	7:07 PM	Alaska*		Berry Events Center • Marquette, Michigan	FloHockey	Halász	L 1–2	2,338	4–5–0
October 29	6:07 PM	Alaska*		Berry Events Center • Marquette, Michigan	FloHockey	Halász	W 3–2	2,321	5–5–0
November 4	7:07 PM	at Lake Superior State		Taffy Abel Arena • Sault Ste. Marie, Michigan	FloHockey	Halász	W 3–1	1,958	6–5–0 (2–1–0)
November 5	6:07 PM	at Lake Superior State		Taffy Abel Arena • Sault Ste. Marie, Michigan	FloHockey	Halász	W 5–3	1,978	7–5–0 (3–1–0)
November 11	7:07 PM	Bemidji State		Berry Events Center • Marquette, Michigan	FloHockey	Halász	W 2–0	2,506	8–5–0 (4–1–0)
November 12	6:07 PM	Bemidji State		Berry Events Center • Marquette, Michigan	FloHockey	Halász	L 1–4	2,875	8–6–0 (4–2–0)
November 18	8:07 PM	at #8 Minnesota State		Mayo Clinic Health System Event Center • Mankato, Minnesota	KEYC	Halász	W 3–2	4,344	9–6–0 (5–2–0)
November 19	7:07 PM	at #8 Minnesota State		Mayo Clinic Health System Event Center • Mankato, Minnesota	KEYC	Halász	L 1–4	4,562	9–7–0 (5–3–0)
December 2	7:07 PM	#19 Michigan Tech		Berry Events Center • Marquette, Michigan (Rivalry)	FloHockey	Halász	W 4–3 ^{OT}	4,263	10–7–0 (6–3–0)
December 3	6:07 PM	at #19 Michigan Tech		MacInnes Student Ice Arena • Houghton, Michigan (Rivalry)	FloHockey	Halász	L 1–3	4,025	10–8–0 (6–4–0)
December 9	7:07 PM	at Ferris State		Ewigleben Arena • Big Rapids, Michigan	FloHockey	DiMatteo	L 2–5	1,891	10–9–0 (6–5–0)
December 10	6:07 PM	at Ferris State		Ewigleben Arena • Big Rapids, Michigan	FloHockey	Halász	W 5–2	2,001	11–9–0 (7–5–0)
January 6	7:07 PM	#19 Minnesota State		Berry Events Center • Marquette, Michigan	FloHockey	Halász	L 2–5	2,229	11–10–0 (7–6–0)
January 7	6:07 PM	#19 Minnesota State		Berry Events Center • Marquette, Michigan	FloHockey	DiMatteo	L 3–5	2,766	11–11–0 (7–7–0)
January 20	8:07 PM	at Bemidji State		Sanford Center • Bemidji, Minnesota	FloHockey	Halász	L 0–4	1,808	11–12–0 (7–8–0)
January 21	7:07 PM	at Bemidji State		Sanford Center • Bemidji, Minnesota	FloHockey, FOX 9+	Halász	W 5–2	1,773	12–12–0 (8–8–0)
January 27	7:07 PM	at #13 Michigan Tech		MacInnes Student Ice Arena • Houghton, Michigan (Rivalry)	FloHockey	Halász	L 0–3	4,179	12–13–0 (8–9–0)
January 28	6:07 PM	#13 Michigan Tech		Berry Events Center • Marquette, Michigan (Rivalry)	FloHockey	Halász	L 1–4	4,260	12–14–0 (8–10–0)
February 3	7:07 PM	Lake Superior State		Berry Events Center • Marquette, Michigan	FloHockey	Halász	L 2–4	2,365	12–15–0 (8–11–0)
February 4	6:07 PM	Lake Superior State		Berry Events Center • Marquette, Michigan	FloHockey	Halász	W 3–1	2,738	13–15–0 (9–11–0)
February 10	8:07 PM	at St. Thomas		St. Thomas Ice Arena • Mendota Heights, Minnesota	FloHockey	Halász	W 3–0	898	14–15–0 (10–11–0)
February 11	7:07 PM	at St. Thomas		St. Thomas Ice Arena • Mendota Heights, Minnesota	FloHockey	Halász	L 2–4	870	14–16–0 (10–12–0)
February 17	7:07 PM	Ferris State		Berry Events Center • Marquette, Michigan	FloHockey	Halász	W 9–2	2,464	15–16–0 (11–12–0)
February 18	6:07 PM	Ferris State		Berry Events Center • Marquette, Michigan	FloHockey	Halász	W 8–3	3,779	16–16–0 (12–12–0)
February 24	7:07 PM	at Bowling Green		Slater Family Ice Arena • Bowling Green, Ohio	FloHockey	Halász	W 4–2	3,103	17–16–0 (13–12–0)
February 25	7:07 PM	at Bowling Green		Slater Family Ice Arena • Bowling Green, Ohio	FloHockey	Halász	W 4–2	4,498	18–16–0 (14–12–0)
CCHA Tournament
March 3	7:07 PM	Bemidji State*		Berry Events Center • Marquette, Michigan (Quarterfinal Game 1)	FloHockey	Halász	W 7–3	3,116	19–16–0
March 4	6:07 PM	Bemidji State*		Berry Events Center • Marquette, Michigan (Quarterfinal Game 2)	FloHockey	Halász	W 2–1 ^{OT}	2,269	20–16–0
March 11	6:07 PM	at #10 Michigan Tech*		MacInnes Student Ice Arena • Houghton, Michigan (Semifinal, Rivalry)	FloHockey	Halász	W 4–0	3,930	21–16–0
March 18	7:07 PM	at #12 Minnesota State*		Mayo Clinic Health System Event Center • Mankato, Minnesota (Championship)	FloHockey	Halász	L 2–3 ^{OT}	4,805	21–17–0
*Non-conference game. ^{#}Rankings from USCHO.com Poll. All times are in Eastern Time. Source:

== Scoring statistics ==
Name	Position	Games	Goals	Assists	Points	PIM
André Ghantous	RW	38	13	25	38	32
A. J. Vanderbeck	C	35	13	19	32	33
Artem Shlaine	C	38	11	21	32	18
Joey Larson	RW	36	13	14	27	14
Kristóf Papp	C	38	11	15	26	21
David Keefer	RW	38	15	10	25	8
Michael Colella	F	37	7	11	18	25
Alex Frye	C	38	6	12	18	16
Josh Zinger	D	38	3	13	16	12
Simon Kjellberg	D	32	4	10	14	24
Connor Eddy	C	35	4	6	10	14
Vincent De Mey	F	34	7	2	9	22
Mike Van Unen	D	36	3	5	8	36
Aiden Gallacher	D	38	2	5	7	39
Reilly Funk	C	23	1	6	7	21
Colby Enns	D	32	1	5	6	10
Tanner Vescio	D	23	2	3	5	8
Rylan Van Unen	F	14	4	0	4	17
Jett Jungels	F	13	1	3	4	6
Zach Michaelis	C	15	1	1	2	2
Brett Willits	C	16	1	1	2	10
Béni Halász	G	35	0	2	2	0
Tyrell Boucher	D	28	0	1	1	12
Rico DiMatteo	G	2	0	0	0	0
Jakob Peterson	D	3	0	0	0	2
Nathan Butler	F	5	0	0	0	7
Charlie Glockner	G	5	0	0	0	0
Isack Bandu	D	9	0	0	0	6
Luke Gramer	D	14	0	0	0	4
Total			123	190	313	407

== Goaltending statistics ==
Name	Games	Minutes	Wins	Losses	Ties	Goals against	Saves	Shut outs	SV %	GAA
Béni Halász	35	1941:24	19	15	0	75	855	3	.919	2.32
Charlie Glockner	8	256:01	2	1	0	13	111	0	.895	3.05
Rico DiMatteo	3	74:13	0	1	0	5	33	0	.868	4.04
Empty Net	-	22:37	-	-	-	10	-	-	-	-
Total	38	2294:15	21	17	0	103	999	3	.890	2.69

== Rankings ==
Poll	Week																											
Poll	Pre	1	2	3	4	5	6	7	8	9	10	11	12	13	14	15	16	17	18	19	20	21	22	23	24	25	26	27 (Final)
USCHO.com	NR	-	NR	NR	NR	NR	NR	NR	NR	NR	NR	NR	NR	-	NR	NR	NR	NR	NR	NR	NR	NR	NR	NR	NR	NR	-	NR
USA Today	20	20	NR	20	NR	NR	NR	NR	NR	NR	NR	NR	NR	NR	NR	NR	NR	NR	NR	NR	NR	NR	NR	NR	NR	NR	NR	NR

Note: USCHO did not release a poll in weeks 1, 13, or 26.

== Awards and honors ==
Player	Award	Ref
André Ghantous	CCHA Second Team	
Béni Halász	CCHA Rookie Team	
Josh Zinger	CCHA Rookie Team	
Joey Larson	CCHA Rookie Team	

== Players drafted into the NHL ==
=== 2023 NHL entry draft ===
Round	Pick	Player	NHL team
4	118	Hampton Slukynsky ^{+}	Los Angeles Kings
5	152	Rasmus Larsson ^{+}	New York Rangers

+ incoming freshman
