= 2022–23 Bemidji State Beavers men's ice hockey season =

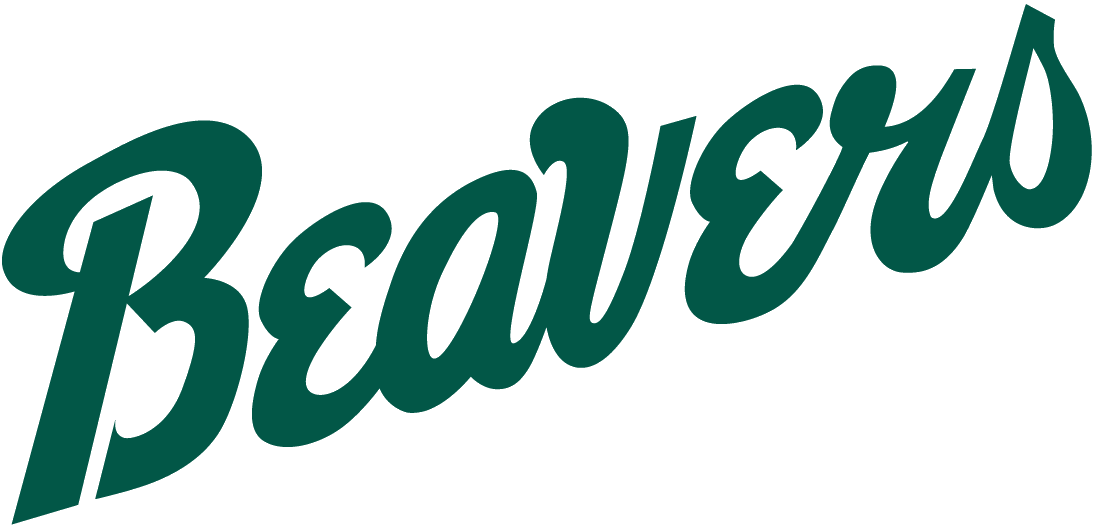
- Conference: T–4th CCHA
- Home ice: Sanford Center

Rankings
- USCHO: NR
- USA Today: NR

Record
- Overall: 14–17–5
- Conference: 12–11–3
- Home: 7–6–4
- Road: 7–11–1

Coaches and captains
- Head coach: Tom Serratore
- Assistant coaches: Travis Winter; Mike Gibbons; Dylan Schoen
- Captain(s): Ross Armour; Kyle Looft
- Alternate captain(s): Elias Rosén; Will Zmolek

The 2022–23 Bemidji State Beavers men's ice hockey season was the 67th season of play for the program, the 23rd at the Division I level and 2nd in the Central Collegiate Hockey Association (CCHA). The Beavers represented Bemidji State University, played their home games at Sanford Center and were coached by Tom Serratore, in his 22nd season.

== Season ==
From the start of the season, Bemidji State had to contend with the loss of its 5 top goal scorers from the previous season. Early on, the defense stepped up and played a major role in the Beavers' success. The team earned a split with then-#2 St. Cloud State and were undefeated in conference play by early November. They cooled off a little after that but were still in a good position by the end of the fall semester. The Beavers rounded out the first half of their season with a road sweep of Minnesota State and reappeared in the USA Today poll.

Unfortunately for Bemidji State, the lack of scoring punch caught up with them and the team stumbled in the second half of their season. After January 1, Bemidji scored more than 2 goals in just 4 of their 16 games. While they won all of those matches, they went 1–10–1 in the other contests and ended up slipping to 5th in the CCHA standings.

Bemidji State opened their playoff run with an abysmal performance against Northern Michigan, allowing a season-high 7 goals. With their back to the wall, the Beavers were much better in the rematch and held the Wildcats to 1 goal after 60 minutes. Again, however, the team could barely score themselves and could only force the match into overtime. Mattias Sholl managed to stop the first two shots but the third, coming just after the 1-minute mark, found the back of the net and ended the Beavers' season.

== Departures ==
Player	Position	Nationality	Cause
Alex Adams	Forward	United States	Graduation (retired)
Nicholas Cardelli	Forward	United States	Graduation (retired)
Alex Ierullo	Forward	Canada	Graduation (signed with Ontario Reign)
Bradley Johnson	Defenseman	United States	Graduation (signed with Trois-Rivières Lions)
Tyler Jubenvill	Defenseman	Canada	Graduation (retired)
Tyler Kirkup	Forward	Canada	Graduation (signed with Reading Royals)
Lukas Sillinger	Forward	Canada	Transferred to Arizona State
Owen Sillinger	Forward	Canada	Graduation (signed with Cleveland Monsters)
Sam Solenský	Forward	Slovakia	Signed professional contract (HK Nitra)
Ethan Somoza	Forward	United States	Graduation (signed with Greenville Swamp Rabbits)

== Recruiting ==
Player	Position	Nationality	Age	Notes
Logan Acheson	Defenseman	Canada	20	Edmonton, AB
Vincent Corcoran	Defenseman	United States	21	Plainfield, IL
Adam Flammang	Forward	United States	20	St. Michael, MN
Kirklan Irey	Forward	United States	21	Bismarck, ND
Jackson Jutting	Forward	United States	21	Savage, MN; transfer from Colorado College
Mitchell Martan	Forward	United States	24	Whitby, ON; graduate transfer from Canisius
Kaden Pickering	Forward	United States	23	Madrid, NY; graduate transfer from St. Lawrence
Lleyton Roed	Forward	United States	20	White Bear Lake, MN
Patrik Satosaari	Defenseman	Finland	21	Jyväskylä, FIN
Mitchell Wolfe	Defenseman	United States	20	Andover, MN

== Roster ==
As of July 8, 2022.

No.	Nat.	Player	Class	Pos	Height	Weight	DoB	Hometown	Previous team	NHL rights
1	(United States)	Gavin Enright	Junior	G	6' 1" (1.85 m)	161 lb (73 kg)	1999-08-26	Farmington, Minnesota	Green Bay Gamblers (USHL)	—
2	(United States)	Tony Follmer	Sophomore	D	6' 2" (1.88 m)	186 lb (84 kg)	2000-10-26	O'Fallon, Missouri	Lincoln Stars (USHL)	—
3	(United States)	Jack Powell	Junior	D	5' 10" (1.78 m)	188 lb (85 kg)	1999-09-11	Alexandria, Minnesota	Aberdeen Wings (NAHL)	—
4	(United States)	Will Zmolek (A)	Senior	D	6' 3" (1.91 m)	202 lb (92 kg)	1999-04-02	Rochester, Minnesota	Cedar Rapids RoughRiders (USHL)	—
5	(United States)	Will Magnuson	Sophomore	D	5' 9" (1.75 m)	190 lb (86 kg)	2001-10-16	Chaska, Minnesota	Bismarck Bobcats (NAHL)	—
6	(United States)	Mitch Wolfe	Freshman	D	6' 0" (1.83 m)	185 lb (84 kg)	2002-07-19	Andover, Minnesota	Des Moines Buccaneers (USHL)	—
7	(United States)	Kyle Looft (C)	Senior	D	6' 3" (1.91 m)	207 lb (94 kg)	1998-06-27	Mankato, Minnesota	Cedar Rapids RoughRiders (USHL)	—
8	(United States)	Adam Flammang	Freshman	F	5' 11" (1.8 m)	190 lb (86 kg)	2001-11-09	St. Michael, Minnesota	Cedar Rapids RoughRiders (USHL)	—
9	(United States)	Carter Jones	Senior	F	5' 10" (1.78 m)	178 lb (81 kg)	1999-05-15	Hillyard, Washington	Trail Smoke Eaters (BCHL)	—
11	(Canada)	Eric Martin	Junior	F	5' 11" (1.8 m)	167 lb (76 kg)	2000-06-05	Calgary, Alberta	Drumheller Dragons (AJHL)	—
12	(Finland)	Patrik Satosaari	Freshman	D	5' 10" (1.78 m)	172 lb (78 kg)	2001-06-18	Jyväskylä, Finland	Lahti Pelicans U20 (U20 SM-sarja)	—
13	(United States)	Donte Lawson	Sophomore	F	5' 10" (1.78 m)	161 lb (73 kg)	2000-11-03	Taconite, Minnesota	Minnesota Wilderness (NAHL)	—
14	(Canada)	Mitchell Martan	Graduate	F	5' 8" (1.73 m)	181 lb (82 kg)	1998-06-30	Whitby, Ontario	Canisius (AHA)	—
15	(Canada)	Logan Acheson	Freshman	D	5' 10" (1.78 m)	179 lb (81 kg)	2002-04-24	Edmonton, Alberta	Spruce Grove Saints (AJHL)	—
16	(Finland)	Jere Väisänen	Sophomore	F	5' 11" (1.8 m)	165 lb (75 kg)	2000-07-10	Espoo, Finland	Amarillo Bulls (NAHL)	—
17	(Canada)	Ross Armour (C)	Graduate	F	6' 2" (1.88 m)	182 lb (83 kg)	1998-02-07	Trail, British Columbia	Trail Smoke Eaters (BCHL)	—
18	(United States)	Kaden Pickering	Graduate	F	5' 9" (1.75 m)	181 lb (82 kg)	1998-12-17	Madrid, New York	St. Lawrence (ECAC)	—
19	(Canada)	Brad Belisle	Senior	F	6' 1" (1.85 m)	196 lb (89 kg)	1998-01-26	Thunder Bay, Ontario	Aberdeen Wings (NAHL)	—
20	(United States)	Kirklan Irey	Freshman	F	5' 11" (1.8 m)	172 lb (78 kg)	2001-01-08	Bismarck, North Dakota	Sioux City Musketeers (USHL)	—
21	(Sweden)	Alexander Lundman	Sophomore	F	6' 1" (1.85 m)	187 lb (85 kg)	2001-06-17	Norrköping, Sweden	HV71 J20 (J20 Nationell)	—
22	(United States)	Austin Jouppi	Junior	F	5' 11" (1.8 m)	177 lb (80 kg)	2000-04-18	Duluth, Minnesota	Bismarck Bobcats (NAHL)	—
23	(United States)	Aaron Myers	Junior	F	6' 0" (1.83 m)	173 lb (78 kg)	1999-09-28	Thief River Falls, Minnesota	Minnesota Wilderness (NAHL)	—
25	(United States)	Vincent Corcoran	Freshman	F	5' 8" (1.73 m)	165 lb (75 kg)	2001-09-21	Plainfield, Illinois	Wichita Falls Warriors (NAHL)	—
26	(Poland)	Jakub Lewandowski	Sophomore	F	6' 4" (1.93 m)	203 lb (92 kg)	2001-10-25	Toruń, Poland	Vítkovice U20 (Extraliga juniorů)	—
27	(United States)	Jackson Jutting	Junior	F	5' 10" (1.78 m)	196 lb (89 kg)	2001-02-27	Savage, Minnesota	Colorado College (NCHC)	—
28	(Sweden)	Elias Rosén (A)	Senior	D	5' 10" (1.78 m)	181 lb (82 kg)	1999-01-04	Mora, Sweden	Tri-City Storm (USHL)	—
29	(United States)	Lleyton Roed	Freshman	F	6' 0" (1.83 m)	179 lb (81 kg)	2002-08-08	White Bear Lake, Minnesota	Tri-City Storm (USHL)	—
30	(United States)	Mattias Sholl	Sophomore	G	5' 9" (1.75 m)	173 lb (78 kg)	2000-09-30	Hermosa Beach, California	Youngstown Phantoms (USHL)	—
35	(United States)	Michael Carr	Senior	G	6' 0" (1.83 m)	179 lb (81 kg)	1998-06-08	Columbus, Ohio	Cornwall Colts (CCHL)	—

== Standings ==
2022–23 Central Collegiate Hockey Association Standings
	Conference record										Overall record					
	GP	W	L	T	OTW	OTL	SW	PTS	GF	GA	GP	W	L	T	GF	GA
#12 Minnesota State †*	26	16	9	1	2	4	1	52	83	56	39	25	13	1	126	81
#13 Michigan Tech	26	15	7	4	0	1	0	50	68	54	39	24	11	4	103	88
Bowling Green	26	12	12	2	0	2	1	41	89	76	36	15	19	2	114	114
Northern Michigan	26	14	12	0	3	0	0	39	82	77	38	21	17	0	123	103
Bemidji State	26	12	11	3	3	1	2	39	73	63	36	14	17	5	94	97
Ferris State	26	9	14	3	1	2	3	34	62	91	37	14	19	4	92	131
St. Thomas	26	10	14	2	1	1	0	32	69	81	36	11	23	2	86	117
Lake Superior State	26	8	17	1	2	1	1	25	52	80	36	9	25	2	71	118
Championship: March 18, 2023 † indicates conference regular season champion (MacNaughton Cup) * indicates conference tournament champion (Mason Cup); Rankings: USCHO.com Top 20 Poll

== Schedule and results ==
Date	Time	Opponent^{#}	Rank^{#}	Site	TV	Decision	Result	Attendance	Record
Regular Season
October 7	7:07 PM	Arizona State*		Sanford Center • Bemidji, Minnesota	FloHockey	Sholl	L 0–3	1,955	0–1–0
October 8	6:07 PM	Arizona State*		Sanford Center • Bemidji, Minnesota	FloHockey	Enright	W 5–4 ^{OT}	2,031	1–1–0
October 21	6:07 PM	at Michigan Tech		MacInnes Student Ice Arena • Houghton, Michigan	FloHockey	Sholl	W 5–2	3,260	2–1–0 (1–0–0)
October 22	5:07 PM	at Michigan Tech		MacInnes Student Ice Arena • Houghton, Michigan	FloHockey	Sholl	T 2–2 ^{SOW}	3,092	2–1–1 (1–0–1)
October 28	7:07 PM	#2 St. Cloud State*		Sanford Center • Bemidji, Minnesota	FloHockey	Sholl	W 3–1	2,651	3–1–1
October 29	6:07 PM	at #2 St. Cloud State*		Herb Brooks National Hockey Center • St. Cloud, Minnesota	FOX 9+	Enright	L 1–4	4,023	3–2–1
November 4	7:07 PM	Ferris State	#20	Sanford Center • Bemidji, Minnesota	FloHockey	Sholl	T 2–2 ^{SOL}	2,036	3–2–2 (1–0–2)
November 5	6:07 PM	Ferris State	#20	Sanford Center • Bemidji, Minnesota	FloHockey	Enright	W 2–1 ^{OT}	1,639	4–2–2 (2–0–2)
November 11	6:07 PM	at Northern Michigan		Berry Events Center • Marquette, Michigan	FloHockey	Sholl	L 0–2	2,506	4–3–2 (2–1–2)
November 12	5:07 PM	at Northern Michigan		Berry Events Center • Marquette, Michigan	FloHockey	Sholl	W 4–1	2,875	5–3–2 (3–1–2)
November 25	7:07 PM	North Dakota*		Sanford Center • Bemidji, Minnesota	FloHockey	Sholl	T 3–3 ^{OT}	3,712	5–3–3
November 26	6:07 PM	at North Dakota*		Ralph Engelstad Arena • Grand Forks, North Dakota	Midco	Enright	L 2–4	11,470	5–4–3
December 2	7:07 PM	St. Thomas		Sanford Center • Bemidji, Minnesota	FloHockey	Sholl	W 6–4	2,064	6–4–3 (4–1–2)
December 3	6:07 PM	St. Thomas		Sanford Center • Bemidji, Minnesota	FloHockey	Sholl	T 2–2 ^{SOW}	1,617	6–4–4 (4–1–3)
December 9	7:07 PM	Lake Superior State		Sanford Center • Bemidji, Minnesota	FloHockey	Sholl	L 2–3 ^{OT}	1,334	6–5–4 (4–2–3)
December 10	6:07 PM	Lake Superior State		Sanford Center • Bemidji, Minnesota	FloHockey	Sholl	W 4–1	1,286	7–5–4 (5–2–3)
December 15	7:07 PM	at #16 Minnesota State		Mayo Clinic Health System Event Center • Mankato, Minnesota	KEYC	Sholl	W 4–3 ^{OT}	4,531	8–5–4 (6–2–3)
December 16	7:07 PM	at #16 Minnesota State		Mayo Clinic Health System Event Center • Mankato, Minnesota	KEYC	Sholl	W 4–1	4,524	9–5–4 (7–2–3)
December 31	5:07 PM	#3 Minnesota*		Sanford Center • Bemidji, Minnesota (Exhibition)	FloHockey, FOX 9+	Enright	L 1–2	4,373	
January 6	7:07 PM	Minnesota Duluth*		Sanford Center • Bemidji, Minnesota	FloHockey	Sholl	T 1–1 ^{OT}	2,136	9–5–5
January 7	6:07 PM	at Minnesota Duluth*		AMSOIL Arena • Duluth, Minnesota	MY9	Enright	L 2–5	5,821	9–6–5
January 13	6:07 PM	at Bowling Green		Slater Family Ice Arena • Bowling Green, Ohio	FloHockey	Sholl	L 2–4	3,009	9–7–5 (7–3–3)
January 14	6:07 PM	at Bowling Green		Slater Family Ice Arena • Bowling Green, Ohio	FloHockey	Sholl	L 2–5	3,339	9–8–5 (7–4–3)
January 20	7:07 PM	Northern Michigan		Sanford Center • Bemidji, Minnesota	FloHockey	Sholl	W 4–0	1,808	10–8–5 (8–4–3)
January 21	6:07 PM	Northern Michigan		Sanford Center • Bemidji, Minnesota	FloHockey, FOX 9+	Sholl	L 2–5	1,773	10–9–5 (8–5–3)
January 27	6:07 PM	at Lake Superior State		Taffy Abel Arena • Sault Ste. Marie, Michigan	FloHockey	Enright	W 3–2	2,356	11–9–5 (9–5–3)
January 28	5:07 PM	at Lake Superior State		Taffy Abel Arena • Sault Ste. Marie, Michigan	FloHockey	Enright	L 2–3	1,478	11–10–5 (9–6–3)
February 3	7:07 PM	#12 Michigan Tech		Sanford Center • Bemidji, Minnesota	FloHockey	Sholl	L 0–2	1,931	11–11–5 (9–7–3)
February 4	6:07 PM	#12 Michigan Tech		Sanford Center • Bemidji, Minnesota	FloHockey	Sholl	L 2–3	2,845	11–12–5 (9–8–3)
February 10	6:07 PM	at Ferris State		Ewigleben Arena • Big Rapids, Michigan	FloHockey	Sholl	L 2–3	1,947	11–13–5 (9–9–3)
February 11	5:07 PM	at Ferris State		Ewigleben Arena • Big Rapids, Michigan	FloHockey	Sholl	W 6–2	1,847	12–13–5 (10–9–3)
February 17	7:07 PM	#13 Minnesota State		Sanford Center • Bemidji, Minnesota	FloHockey	Sholl	L 1–4	1,892	12–14–5 (10–10–3)
February 18	6:07 PM	#13 Minnesota State		Sanford Center • Bemidji, Minnesota	FloHockey	Sholl	W 2–1 ^{OT}	2,103	13–14–5 (11–10–3)
February 24	7:07 PM	at St. Thomas		St. Thomas Ice Arena • Mendota Heights, Minnesota	FloHockey	Sholl	L 1–3	775	13–15–5 (11–11–3)
February 25	7:07 PM	at St. Thomas		St. Thomas Ice Arena • Mendota Heights, Minnesota	FloHockey	Sholl	W 7–2	924	14–15–5 (12–11–3)
CCHA Tournament
March 3	6:07 PM	at Northern Michigan*		Berry Events Center • Marquette, Michigan (Quarterfinal Game 1)	FloHockey	Sholl	L 3–7	3,116	14–16–5
March 4	5:07 PM	at Northern Michigan*		Berry Events Center • Marquette, Michigan (Quarterfinal Game 2)	FloHockey	Sholl	L 1–2 ^{OT}	2,269	14–17–5
*Non-conference game. ^{#}Rankings from USCHO.com Poll. All times are in Central Time. Source:

== Scoring statistics ==
Name	Position	Games	Goals	Assists	Points	PIM
Lleyton Roed	F	36	13	18	31	6
Elias Rosén	D	36	4	24	28	18
Ross Armour	F	32	14	8	22	30
Will Zmolek	D	36	4	17	21	24
Mitchell Martan	LW	33	8	10	18	8
Jere Väisänen	F	36	7	10	17	13
Kaden Pickering	RW	36	5	9	14	10
Eric Martin	F	24	4	9	13	6
Carter Jones	F	23	3	10	13	4
Jackson Jutting	F	33	4	8	12	12
Alexander Lundman	LW/RW	35	9	1	10	10
Kyle Looft	D	36	5	3	8	19
Jakub Lewandowski	F	34	4	3	7	24
Adam Flammang	RW	32	5	1	6	22
Aaron Myers	F	35	3	1	4	6
Kirklan Irey	F	23	1	3	4	2
Will Magnuson	D	35	1	2	3	4
Patrik Satosaari	D	12	0	3	3	0
Vince Corcoran	D	20	0	3	3	4
Logan Acheson	D	15	0	1	1	2
Austin Jouppi	F	1	0	0	0	0
Gavin Enright	G	7	0	0	0	0
Brad Belisle	C	8	0	0	0	7
Donte Lawson	D	10	0	0	0	2
Mitch Wolfe	D	26	0	0	0	6
Mattias Sholl	G	30	0	0	0	2
Tony Follmer	D	35	0	0	0	17
Total			94	144	238	258

== Goaltending statistics ==
Name	Games	Minutes	Wins	Losses	Ties	Goals against	Saves	Shut outs	SV %	GAA
Mattias Sholl	30	1778:42	11	13	5	67	661	1	.908	2.26
Gavin Enright	7	404:04	3	4	0	19	149	0	.887	2.82
Empty Net	-	19:06	-	-	-	11	-	-	-	-
Total	36	2201:52	14	17	5	97	810	1	.893	2.64

== Rankings ==
Poll	Week																											
Poll	Pre	1	2	3	4	5	6	7	8	9	10	11	12	13	14	15	16	17	18	19	20	21	22	23	24	25	26	27 (Final)
USCHO.com	NR	-	NR	NR	NR	NR	20	NR	NR	NR	NR	NR	NR	-	NR	NR	NR	NR	NR	NR	NR	NR	NR	NR	NR	NR	-	NR
USA Today	NR	NR	NR	NR	NR	NR	NR	20	NR	NR	NR	NR	NR	NR	20	NR	NR	NR	NR	NR	NR	NR	NR	NR	NR	NR	NR	NR

Note: USCHO did not release a poll in weeks 1, 13, or 26.

== Awards and honors ==
Player	Award	Ref
Elias Rosén	CCHA First Team	
Mattias Sholl	CCHA Second Team	
Lleyton Roed	CCHA Rookie Team	

== Players drafted into the NHL ==
=== 2023 NHL entry draft ===
Round	Pick	Player	NHL team
5	132	Eric Pohlkamp ^{†}	San Jose Sharks

† incoming freshman
