= Mike Hastings (ice hockey) =

American ice hockey coach (born 1966)

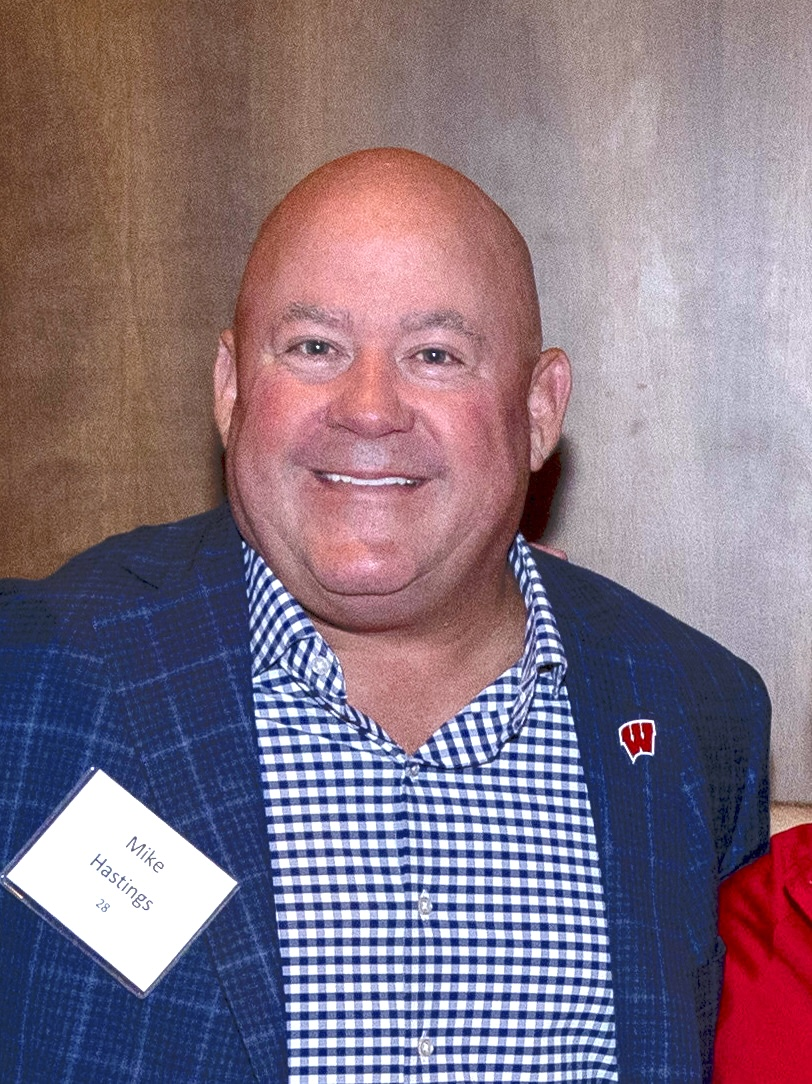
- Hastings in 2024

Current position
- Title: Head coach
- Team: Wisconsin Badgers
- Conference: Big Ten
- Record: 63–46–7 (.573)

Biographical details
- Born: February 3, 1966 (age 60); Eugene, Oregon, U.S.
- Education: St. Cloud State University

Playing career
- 1986–1988: St. Cloud State
- Position: Defenseman

Coaching career (HC unless noted)
- 1990–1992: St. Cloud State (Assistant)
- 1992–1993: Omaha Lancers (Assistant)
- 1993–1994: St. Cloud State (Assistant)
- 1994–2008: Omaha Lancers
- 2003, 2005: US World Junior Team (Assistant)
- 2008–2009: Minnesota (Assistant)
- 2009–2012: Nebraska–Omaha (Assistant)
- 2012–2023: Minnesota State
- 2022: US Olympic Team (Assistant)
- 2023–present: Wisconsin

Head coaching record
- Overall: 362–155–32 (.689) [College]
- Tournaments: 8–10 (.444)

Accomplishments and honors

Championships
- 6× WCHA Champion (2015, 2016, 2018, 2019, 2020, 2021); 3× WCHA Tournament champion (2014, 2015, 2019); 2× CCHA Champion (2022, 2023); 2× CCHA Tournament champion (2022, 2023)

Awards
- 3× WCHA Coach of the Year (2013, 2015, 2021); 3× Spencer Penrose Award (2015, 2021, 2022); CCHA Coach of the Year (2022)

Mike Hastings (born February 3, 1966) is an American ice hockey coach at the collegiate level. Since 2023, he has been the head coach of the Wisconsin Badgers men's ice hockey team. He was head coach of the Minnesota State Mavericks men's ice hockey team from 2012 to 2023.

== Career ==
Hastings was the head coach of the Omaha/River City Lancers from 1994 to 2008 where he was twice named the USHL Coach of the Year (1996–97 and 2001–02) and five times was named the USHL General Manager of the Year (1997, 2002, 2005, 2007 and 2008).

After a successful 14-year run in the USHL Hastings returned to the college ranks, joining the staff at Minnesota as an assistant for a year before becoming an associate head coach at Nebraska–Omaha. After three years with the Mavericks Hastings accepted the head coaching position at Minnesota State. When Hastings arrived in Mankato the program had only one winning season in the previous nine years and he immediately turned the program around. In his first year the team doubled their win total, going 24–14–3 and making the second NCAA tournament appearance since joining Division I in 1996. The team improved in each of the next two seasons, winning the WCHA tournament both years and was the #1 seed in the 2015 NCAA Tournament.

In the 2021 Tournament, Hastings and Minnesota State won 2 games on their way to the Frozen Four. Hastings' 5 consecutive 20+ win seasons to start his career led to Minnesota State giving him a 10-year contract extension in the spring of 2017.

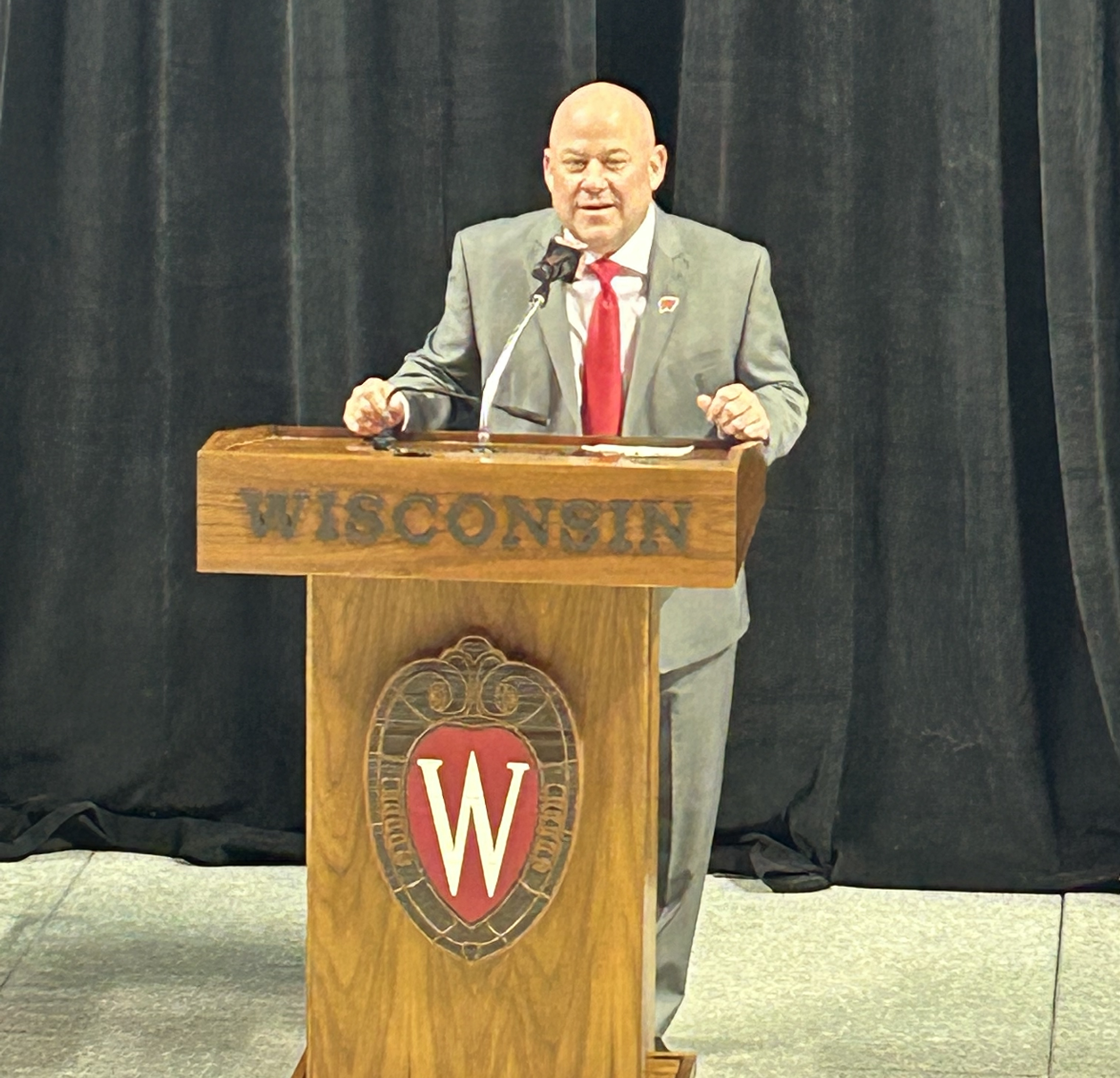
Hastings in April 2023

On March 30, 2023, it was announced that Hastings had been hired as the head coach of the Wisconsin Badgers men's ice hockey team, replacing Tony Granato after seven seasons.

== Head coaching record ==
=== College ===
Record table
Season	Team	Overall	Conference	Standing	Postseason
Minnesota State Mavericks (WCHA) (2012–2021)
2012–13	Minnesota State	24–14–3	16–11–1	T-4th	NCAA Midwest Regional semifinals
2013–14	Minnesota State	26–14–1	20–7–1	2nd	NCAA Northeast Regional semifinals
2014–15	Minnesota State	29–8–3	21–4–3	1st	NCAA Midwest Regional semifinals
2015–16	Minnesota State	21–13–7	16–5–6	T-1st	WCHA Runner-Up
2016–17	Minnesota State	22–13–4	15–9–4–2	3rd	WCHA semifinals
2017–18	Minnesota State	29–10–1	22–5–1–0	1st	NCAA West Regional semifinals
2018–19	Minnesota State	32–8–2	22–5–1–1	1st	NCAA East Regional semifinals
2019–20	Minnesota State	31–5–2	23–4–1–1	1st	Tournament cancelled
2020–21	Minnesota State	22–5–1	13–1–0	1st	NCAA Frozen Four
Minnesota State Mavericks (CCHA) (2021–2023)
2021–22	Minnesota State	38–6–0	23–3–0	1st	NCAA Runner-Up
2022–23	Minnesota State	25–13–1	16–9–1	1st	NCAA West Regional Semifinal
Minnesota State:		299–109–25	207–63–19		
Wisconsin Badgers (Big Ten) (2023–present)
2023–24	Wisconsin	26–12–2	16–7–1	2nd	NCAA East Regional Semifinal
2024–25	Wisconsin	13–21–3	7–16–1	6th	Big Ten Quarterfinals
2025–26	Wisconsin	24–13–2	14–10–0	4th	NCAA Runner-Up
Wisconsin:		63–46–7	37–33–2		
Total:		362–155–32			
National champion Postseason invitational champion Conference regular season champion Conference regular season and conference tournament champion Division regular season champion Division regular season and conference tournament champion Conference tournament champion

Awards and achievements
Preceded by Rick Bennett; Brad Berry / Mike Schafer	Spencer Penrose Award; 2014–15; 2020–21, 2021–22	Succeeded by Rand Pecknold; Bob Motzko
Preceded by Mel Pearson; Bob Daniels; Grant Potulny; Tom Serratore	WCHA Coach of the Year; 2012–13; 2014–15; 2018–19; 2020–21	Succeeded by Bob Daniels; Mel Pearson; Tom Serratore; Award Discontinued
Preceded by Enrico Blasi	CCHA Coach of the Year; 2021–22	Succeeded by Joe Shawhan
