= 2022–23 Lake Superior State Lakers men's ice hockey season =

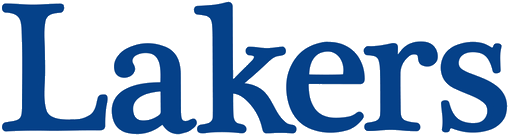
- Conference: 8th CCHA
- Home ice: Taffy Abel Arena

Rankings
- USCHO: NR
- USA Today: NR

Record
- Overall: 9–25–2
- Conference: 8–17–1
- Home: 5–12–1
- Road: 4–11–1
- Neutral: 0–2–0

Coaches and captains
- Head coach: Damon Whitten
- Assistant coaches: Mike York; Dwayne Roloson; D. J. Goldstein
- Captain: Louis Boudon
- Alternate captain(s): Jacob Bengtsson; Jack Jeffers

The 2022–23 Lake Superior State Lakers men's ice hockey season was the 57th season of play for the program, the 50th at the Division I level and the 43rd in the CCHA conference. The Lakers represented Lake Superior State University and were coached by Damon Whitten, in his 9th season.

== Season ==
With the vast majority of the team returning, there was little reason to think that Lake Superior wouldn't be able to have at least as good a season as they had in 2022. However, from the drop of the puck, nothing seemed to go right for the Lakers. Early on, neither Ethan Langenegger nor Seth Eisele were able to keep the puck out of the goal; Laker Superior averaged nearly 4 goals against per game through their first 8 games. Worse, the offense had dried up. Across the board, players were having a much tougher time getting the puck into the opposing goal. The Lakers scored 36 fewer goals than they had the year before, a full goal less per game. With one of the worse offenses in the nation, the team plummeted to the bottom of the CCHA standings and remained their all season. Lake Superior was at or near the bottom of the national rankings as well, and the team was on pace to post the worst season in program history.

Near the end of January, the defense began to come around. Over their final 7 matches, the Lakers allowed just 2 goals against per game. The offense also saw a modest increase and saw the Lakers go 5–2 in those contests. While they were unable to do anything about their playoff position, the increased level of play did allow the team to avoid posting a historically bad season.

Lake Superior's opponent for the quarterfinals was Minnesota State. While there was some hope that the improved play would carry over into the postseason, the Mavericks made quick work of the Lakers in the first game. While the final score was better in the rematch, MSU controlled the game, outshooting LSSU 18–40 and end a very disappointing season for the Lakers.

== Departures ==
Player	Position	Nationality	Cause
Dustin Manz	Forward	United States	Transferred to American International
Miroslav Mucha	Forward	Slovakia	Graduate transfer to Michigan State
Josh Nixon	Forward	Canada	Transferred to Union
Jacob Nordqvist	Defenseman	Sweden	Graduate transfer to Quinnipiac
Mitchell Oliver	Defenseman	Canada	Graduation (retired)

== Recruiting ==
Player	Position	Nationality	Age	Notes
Bryan Huggins	Defenseman	United States	20	Grand Rapids, MI
Jared Kucharek	Defenseman	United States	24	Royal Oak, MI; graduate transfer from Western Michigan
Connor Milburn	Forward	Canada	21	Kamloops, BC

== Roster ==
As of July 30, 2022.

No.	Nat.	Player	Class	Pos	Height	Weight	DoB	Hometown	Previous team	NHL rights
1	(Canada)	Ethan Langenegger	Junior	G	6' 0" (1.83 m)	187 lb (85 kg)	2000-09-10	Kamloops, British Columbia	Salmon Arm Silverbacks (BCHL)	—
2	(United States)	Bryan Huggins	Freshman	D	5' 10" (1.78 m)	183 lb (83 kg)	2002-03-26	Grand Rapids, Michigan	Fargo Force (USHL)	—
3	(United States)	Tyler Williams	Junior	F	5' 7" (1.7 m)	175 lb (79 kg)	2000-05-16	South Lyon, Michigan	Nanaimo Clippers (BCHL)	—
4	(Sweden)	Jacob Bengtsson (A)	Junior	D	6' 3" (1.91 m)	202 lb (92 kg)	1999-05-08	Stockholm, Sweden	Waterloo Black Hawks (USHL)	—
5	(Sweden)	Arvid Henrikson	Senior	D	6' 5" (1.96 m)	211 lb (96 kg)	1998-02-23	Stockholm, Sweden	Austin Bruins (NAHL)	MTL, 187th overall 2016
6	(United States)	Jake Willets	Senior	D	6' 1" (1.85 m)	190 lb (86 kg)	1999-08-06	Monroe, Michigan	Ferris State (CCHA)	—
8	(United States)	Logan Jenuwine	Senior	F	6' 3" (1.91 m)	205 lb (93 kg)	1998-05-15	Romeo, Michigan	Arizona State (NCAA)	—
9	(Canada)	Connor Milburn	Freshman	F	6' 4" (1.93 m)	185 lb (84 kg)	2001-04-11	Kamloops, British Columbia	Chilliwack Chiefs (BCHL)	—
11	(United States)	Dawson Tritt	Sophomore	F	6' 2" (1.88 m)	180 lb (82 kg)	2000-09-01	Spokane, Washington	Lone Star Brahmas (NAHL)	—
12	(United States)	Brandon Puricelli	Senior	F	5' 10" (1.78 m)	180 lb (82 kg)	1998-02-04	Ellisville, Missouri	Minnesota Duluth (NCHC)	—
13	(United States)	Spencer DenBeste	Junior	F	6' 1" (1.85 m)	185 lb (84 kg)	1999-02-17	Marquette, Michigan	Johnstown Tomahawks (NAHL)	—
14	(United States)	Brett Roloson	Sophomore	F	5' 11" (1.8 m)	160 lb (73 kg)	2000-12-29	Worcester, Massachusetts	Minot Minotauros (NAHL)	—
16	(United States)	Harrison Roy	Junior	F	6' 1" (1.85 m)	194 lb (88 kg)	2000-01-17	Lakeville, Massachusetts	Boston College (HEA)	—
17	(Sweden)	Sebastian Miedema	Sophomore	D	6' 1" (1.85 m)	194 lb (88 kg)	2000-09-09	Gävle, Sweden	Sioux Falls Stampede (USHL)	—
18	(Canada)	Cole Craft	Sophomore	F	6' 2" (1.88 m)	195 lb (88 kg)	2001-06-29	North Bay, Ontario	Lincoln Stars (USHL)	—
19	(United States)	Joshua Wildauer	Junior	F	5' 8" (1.73 m)	170 lb (77 kg)	1999-06-16	Dearborn Heights, Michigan	Coquitlam Express (BCHL)	—
20	(United States)	Grant Hindman	Sophomore	D	6' 0" (1.83 m)	200 lb (91 kg)	2002-05-16	Oakland, Michigan	Youngstown Phantoms (USHL)	—
21	(United States)	Jordan Venegoni	Sophomore	F	6' 0" (1.83 m)	185 lb (84 kg)	2000-08-16	Livonia, Michigan	Amarillo Bulls (NAHL)	—
22	(Germany)	Timo Bakos	Sophomore	F	6' 1" (1.85 m)	194 lb (88 kg)	2000-07-28	Augsburg, Germany	Starbulls Rosenheim (Oberliga)	—
23	(Belarus)	Artyom Borshyov	Junior	D	6' 3" (1.91 m)	210 lb (95 kg)	2000-08-22	Vitebsk, Belarus	Northern Cyclones (NCDC)	—
24	(United States)	Jared Kucharek	Graduate	D	6' 4" (1.93 m)	205 lb (93 kg)	1998-05-23	Royal Oak, Michigan	Western Michigan (NCHC)	—
25	(Canada)	Jeremy Gervais	Junior	D	5' 11" (1.8 m)	180 lb (82 kg)	1999-01-09	Prince George, British Columbia	Salmon Arm Silverbacks (BCHL)	—
26	(Canada)	Jack Jeffers (A)	Graduate	F	6' 0" (1.83 m)	180 lb (82 kg)	1997-09-21	Oakville, Ontario	Alabama Huntsville (WCHA)	—
27	(United States)	Benito Posa	Junior	F	6' 1" (1.85 m)	190 lb (86 kg)	1999-01-16	Flint, Michigan	Des Moines Buccaneers (USHL)	—
28	(United States)	Jared Westcott	Junior	F	6' 1" (1.85 m)	200 lb (91 kg)	1999-07-18	Imperial, Missouri	Penn State (Big Ten)	—
29	(France)	Louis Boudon (C)	Senior	F	5' 11" (1.8 m)	172 lb (78 kg)	1998-10-04	Grenoble, France	Northeast Generals (NAHL)	—
30	(Canada)	Easton Hesse	Sophomore	G	6' 0" (1.83 m)	175 lb (79 kg)	2000-06-28	Beaumont, Alberta	Bonnyville Pontiacs (AJHL)	—
31	(United States)	Seth Eisele	Senior	G	6' 5" (1.96 m)	195 lb (88 kg)	1998-10-30	Lake Elmo, Minnesota	Lone Star Brahmas (NAHL)	—

== Standings ==
2022–23 Central Collegiate Hockey Association Standings
	Conference record										Overall record					
	GP	W	L	T	OTW	OTL	SW	PTS	GF	GA	GP	W	L	T	GF	GA
#12 Minnesota State †*	26	16	9	1	2	4	1	52	83	56	39	25	13	1	126	81
#13 Michigan Tech	26	15	7	4	0	1	0	50	68	54	39	24	11	4	103	88
Bowling Green	26	12	12	2	0	2	1	41	89	76	36	15	19	2	114	114
Northern Michigan	26	14	12	0	3	0	0	39	82	77	38	21	17	0	123	103
Bemidji State	26	12	11	3	3	1	2	39	73	63	36	14	17	5	94	97
Ferris State	26	9	14	3	1	2	3	34	62	91	37	14	19	4	92	131
St. Thomas	26	10	14	2	1	1	0	32	69	81	36	11	23	2	86	117
Lake Superior State	26	8	17	1	2	1	1	25	52	80	36	9	25	2	71	118
Championship: March 18, 2023 † indicates conference regular season champion (MacNaughton Cup) * indicates conference tournament champion (Mason Cup); Rankings: USCHO.com Top 20 Poll

== Schedule and results ==
Date	Time	Opponent^{#}	Rank^{#}	Site	TV	Decision	Result	Attendance	Record
Exhibition
October 1	2:07 PM	at #20 Michigan Tech*		MacInnes Student Ice Arena • Houghton, Michigan (Exhibition)		Langenegger	L 2–5	2,470	
October 2	2:00 PM	Nipissing*		Taffy Abel Arena • Sault Ste. Marie, Michigan (Exhibition)		Langenegger	W 6–1	756	
October 7	7:00 PM	at USNTDP*		USA Hockey Arena • Plymouth, Michigan (Exhibition)		Langenegger	L 2–5	1,125	
Regular Season
October 14	7:07 PM	Omaha*		Taffy Abel Arena • Sault Ste. Marie, Michigan	FloHockey	Langenegger	L 1–3	1,654	0–1–0
October 15	6:07 PM	Omaha*		Taffy Abel Arena • Sault Ste. Marie, Michigan	FloHockey	Langenegger	T 4–4 ^{OT}	1,444	0–1–1
October 21	7:07 PM	#5 Michigan*		Taffy Abel Arena • Sault Ste. Marie, Michigan	FloHockey	Langenegger	L 2–5	3,151	0–2–1
October 22	7:07 PM	#5 Michigan*		Taffy Abel Arena • Sault Ste. Marie, Michigan	FloHockey	Eisele	L 1–5	3,422	0–3–1
October 28	7:07 PM	Clarkson*		Taffy Abel Arena • Sault Ste. Marie, Michigan	FloHockey	Eisele	L 3–4 ^{OT}	1,064	0–4–1
October 29	6:07 PM	Clarkson*		Taffy Abel Arena • Sault Ste. Marie, Michigan	FloHockey	Langenegger	W 5–1	1,058	1–4–1
November 4	7:07 PM	Northern Michigan		Taffy Abel Arena • Sault Ste. Marie, Michigan	FloHockey	Eisele	L 1–4	1,958	1–5–1 (0–1–0)
November 5	6:07 PM	Northern Michigan		Taffy Abel Arena • Sault Ste. Marie, Michigan	FloHockey	Langenegger	L 3–5	1,978	1–6–1 (0–2–0)
November 11	7:07 PM	at Michigan Tech		MacInnes Student Ice Arena • Houghton, Michigan	FloHockey	Langenegger	T 2–2 ^{SOW}	3,024	1–6–2 (0–2–1)
November 11	6:07 PM	at Michigan Tech		MacInnes Student Ice Arena • Houghton, Michigan	FloHockey	Langenegger	L 0–2	2,996	1–7–2 (0–3–1)
November 25	8:07 PM	at St. Thomas		St. Thomas Ice Arena • Mendota Heights, Minnesota	FloHockey	Eisele	L 0–4	646	1–8–2 (0–4–1)
November 26	7:07 PM	at St. Thomas		St. Thomas Ice Arena • Mendota Heights, Minnesota	FloHockey	Langenegger	L 1–2	568	1–9–2 (0–5–1)
December 2	7:07 PM	Bowling Green		Taffy Abel Arena • Sault Ste. Marie, Michigan	FloHockey	Langenegger	L 4–7	987	1–10–2 (0–6–1)
December 3	6:07 PM	Bowling Green		Taffy Abel Arena • Sault Ste. Marie, Michigan	FloHockey	Hesse	L 1–5	876	1–11–2 (0–7–1)
December 9	8:07 PM	at Bemidji State		Sanford Center • Bemidji, Minnesota	FloHockey	Langenegger	W 3–2 ^{OT}	1,334	2–11–2 (1–7–1)
December 10	7:07 PM	at Bemidji State		Sanford Center • Bemidji, Minnesota	FloHockey	Langenegger	L 1–4	1,286	2–12–2 (1–8–1)
December 16	7:07 PM	#17 Michigan Tech		Taffy Abel Arena • Sault Ste. Marie, Michigan	FloHockey	Langenegger	W 3–0	713	3–12–2 (2–8–1)
December 17	6:07 PM	#17 Michigan Tech		Taffy Abel Arena • Sault Ste. Marie, Michigan	FloHockey	Langenegger	L 1–5	759	3–13–2 (2–9–1)
Holiday Face–Off
December 28	8:30 PM	vs. Wisconsin*		Fiserv Forum • Milwaukee, Wisconsin (Holiday Face–Off Semifinal)	BSW+	Langenegger	L 0–4	6,533	3–14–2
December 29	5:00 PM	vs. #15 Massachusetts*		Fiserv Forum • Milwaukee, Wisconsin (Holiday Face–Off Consolation)	BSW+	Eisele	L 1–4	-	3–15–2
January 6	7:07 PM	at Bowling Green		Slater Family Ice Arena • Bowling Green, Ohio	FloHockey	Langenegger	L 2–5	2,371	3–16–2 (2–10–1)
January 7	7:07 PM	at Bowling Green		Slater Family Ice Arena • Bowling Green, Ohio	FloHockey	Langenegger	L 3–5	2,339	3–17–2 (2–11–1)
January 13	7:07 PM	Ferris State		Taffy Abel Arena • Sault Ste. Marie, Michigan	FloHockey	Eisele	L 0–4	1,669	3–18–2 (2–12–1)
January 14	6:07 PM	Ferris State		Taffy Abel Arena • Sault Ste. Marie, Michigan	FloHockey	Langenegger	W 4–1	1,213	4–18–2 (3–12–1)
January 20	8:07 PM	at #17 Minnesota State		Mayo Clinic Health System Event Center • Mankato, Minnesota	KEYC	Langenegger	L 2–3 ^{OT}	4,638	4–19–2 (3–13–1)
January 21	7:07 PM	at #17 Minnesota State		Mayo Clinic Health System Event Center • Mankato, Minnesota	KEYC	Langenegger	L 1–3	4,913	4–20–2 (3–14–1)
January 27	7:07 PM	Bemidji State		Taffy Abel Arena • Sault Ste. Marie, Michigan	FloHockey	Langenegger	L 2–3	2,356	4–21–2 (3–15–1)
January 28	6:07 PM	Bemidji State		Taffy Abel Arena • Sault Ste. Marie, Michigan	FloHockey	Eisele	W 3–2	1,478	5–21–2 (4–15–1)
February 3	6:37 PM	at Northern Michigan		Berry Events Center • Marquette, Michigan	FloHockey	Eisele	W 4–2	2,365	6–21–2 (5–15–1)
February 4	6:37 PM	at Northern Michigan		Berry Events Center • Marquette, Michigan	FloHockey	Eisele	L 1–3	2,738	6–22–2 (5–16–1)
February 17	7:07 PM	St. Thomas		Taffy Abel Arena • Sault Ste. Marie, Michigan	FloHockey	Langenegger	W 2–1	1,150	7–22–2 (6–16–1)
February 18	6:07 PM	St. Thomas		Taffy Abel Arena • Sault Ste. Marie, Michigan	FloHockey	Eisele	L 1–2	1,763	7–23–2 (6–17–1)
February 24	7:07 PM	at Ferris State		Ewigleben Arena • Big Rapids, Michigan	FloHockey	Langenegger	W 3–2 ^{OT}	1,904	8–23–2 (7–17–1)
February 25	5:07 PM	at Ferris State		Ewigleben Arena • Big Rapids, Michigan	FloHockey	Eisele	W 4–2	2,398	9–23–2 (8–17–1)
CCHA Tournament
March 3	8:07 PM	at #13 Minnesota State*		Mayo Clinic Health System Event Center • Mankato, Minnesota (Quarterfinal Game 1)	FloHockey	Langenegger	L 1–6	3,604	9–24–2
March 4	7:07 PM	at #13 Minnesota State*		Mayo Clinic Health System Event Center • Mankato, Minnesota (Quarterfinal Game 2)	FloHockey	Eisele	L 1–2	3,798	9–25–2
*Non-conference game. ^{#}Rankings from USCHO.com Poll. All times are in Eastern Time. Source:

== Scoring statistics ==
Name	Position	Games	Goals	Assists	Points	PIM
Louis Boudon	C	36	10	14	24	18
Jacob Bengtsson	D	36	1	22	23	26
Dawson Tritt	F	35	9	8	17	4
Brandon Puricelli	RW	32	6	11	17	14
Harrison Roy	F	31	12	4	16	10
Timo Bakos	F	33	6	8	14	2
Jared Westcott	F	32	6	7	13	32
Jake Willets	D	33	4	8	12	8
Jack Jeffers	F	33	2	7	9	25
Jared Kucharek	D	35	2	5	7	19
Logan Jenuwine	F	17	3	3	6	4
Benito Posa	F	27	3	3	6	37
Connor Millburn	F	34	3	2	5	14
Tyler Williams	C	20	1	3	4	6
Jordan Venegoni	F	28	2	1	3	18
Brett Roloson	F	30	0	3	3	4
Grant Hindman	D	34	0	2	2	18
Bryan Huggins	D	34	0	2	2	4
Cole Craft	RW	17	0	2	2	4
Artyom Borshyov	D	33	1	1	2	10
Jeremy Gervais	D	17	0	1	1	8
Ethan Langenegger	G	25	0	1	1	2
Joshua Wildauer	F	7	0	1	1	2
Arvid Henrikson	D	31	0	1	1	36
Sebastian Miedema	D	9	0	0	0	2
Seth Eisele	G	14	0	0	0	0
Easton Hesse	G	2	0	0	0	0
Total			71	120	191	361

== Goaltending statistics ==
Name	Games	Minutes	Wins	Losses	Ties	Goals against	Saves	Shut outs	SV %	GAA
Seth Eisele	17	753:59	3	9	0	36	376	0	.913	2.86
Ethan Langenegger	27	1318:30	6	15	2	65	654	1	.910	2.96
Easton Hesse	8	79:17	0	1	0	7	42	0	.857	5.30
Empty Net	-	27:10	-	-	-	10	-	-	-	-
Total	36	2178:56	9	25	2	118	1073	1	.901	3.25

== Rankings ==
Poll	Week																											
Poll	Pre	1	2	3	4	5	6	7	8	9	10	11	12	13	14	15	16	17	18	19	20	21	22	23	24	25	26	27 (Final)
USCHO.com	NR	-	NR	NR	NR	NR	NR	NR	NR	NR	NR	NR	NR	-	NR	NR	NR	NR	NR	NR	NR	NR	NR	NR	NR	NR	-	NR
USA Today	NR	NR	NR	NR	NR	NR	NR	NR	NR	NR	NR	NR	NR	NR	NR	NR	NR	NR	NR	NR	NR	NR	NR	NR	NR	NR	NR	NR

Note: USCHO did not release a poll in weeks 1, 13, or 26.

== Awards and honors ==
Player	Award	Ref
Louis Boudon	CCHA Second Team	
