= CCHA Defenseman of the Year =

- Sport: Ice hockey
- Awarded for: The Defenseman of the Year in the CCHA

History
- First award: 2022
- First winner: Jake Livingstone
- Most wins: Jake Livingstone; Evan Murr (2)
- Most recent: Evan Murr

The CCHA Defenseman of the Year is an annual award given out after the conclusion of the Central Collegiate Hockey Association regular season to the best defenseman in the conference as voted by the coaches of each CCHA team. The conference previously awarded two separate individual awards, Best Defensive Defenseman and Best Offensive Defenseman, which were merged to form this solitary award.

== Award winners ==
| Year | Winner | School |
|---|---|---|
| 2021–22 | Jake Livingstone | Minnesota State |
| 2022–23 | Jake Livingstone (2) | Minnesota State |
| 2023–24 | Kyle Looft | Bemidji State |
| 2024–25 | Evan Murr | Minnesota State |
| 2025–26 | Evan Murr (2) | Minnesota State |

=== Winners by school ===
| School | Winners |
|---|---|
| Minnesota State | 4 |
| Bemidji State | 1 |

== See also ==
- CCHA Awards
- Best Defensive Defenseman
- Best Offensive Defenseman
