= Jake Livingstone (ice hockey) =

Canadian ice hockey player (born 1999)

- Born: April 16, 1999 (age 27) Creston, British Columbia
- Height: 6 ft 3 in (191 cm)
- Weight: 205 lb (93 kg; 14 st 9 lb)
- Position: Defence
- Shoots: Right
- NHL team (P) Cur. team Former teams: Calgary Flames; Calgary Wranglers (AHL); Nashville Predators
- NHL draft: Undrafted
- Playing career: 2023–present

Jake Livingstone (born April 16, 1999) is a Canadian professional ice hockey defenceman for the Calgary Wranglers in the American Hockey League (AHL) while under contract to the Calgary Flames in the National Hockey League (NHL). He played college ice hockey at Minnesota State.

== Playing career ==
=== College ===
Livingstone began his collegiate career for Minnesota State during the 2020–21 season. During his freshman season he recorded four goals and ten assists in 28 games for the Mavericks and was named to the All-WCHA Rookie Team and CHN National All-Rookie Team.

During the 2021–22 season, in his sophomore season, he recorded nine goals and 22 assists in 44 games. His 31 points led the CCHA in defenceman scoring. Following the season he was named to the All-CCHA First Team and was named the CCHA Defenseman of the Year.

On September 10, 2022, he was named an alternate captain for the 2022–23 season. During his junior year he recorded eight goals and 27 assists in 39 games. His 27 assists led the team, while his 35 points ranked second on the team. During the regular season, he led all CCHA defenceman in assists, and points. Following an outstanding season he was named to the CCHA First Team and was named the CCHA Defenseman of the Year for the second consecutive season. He was also named an AHCA West Second Team All-American, the 12th Maverick player to be named an All-American since the school transitioned to NCAA Division I. He finished his career at Minnesota State with 21 goals and 59 assists in 111 games. During his time with the Mavericks, the team won three MacNaughton Cups, two Mason Cups, qualified for three NCAA tournaments, two Frozen Fours, and advanced to the national championship game once.

=== Professional ===
On March 29, 2023, the Nashville Predators signed Livingstone to a one-year, entry-level contract. He made his NHL debut for the Predators on April 6, 2023, in a game against the Carolina Hurricanes.

At the conclusion of the season, Livingstone, as a pending restricted free agent, agreed to a two-year, two-way contract extension with the Predators on June 27, 2023.

The Predators would not resign Livingstone following the 2024–25 AHL season, making him a free agent. Un-signed approaching the 2025–26 season, Livingstone signed a professional tryout with the Pittsburgh Penguins on September 17, 2025. After his release from the Penguins, Livingstone was signed to one-year AHL contract with the Charlotte Checkers, affiliate to the Florida Panthers, on October 11, 2025.

After a lone season with the Checkers, Livingstone left as a free agent and secured an NHL contract in agreeing to terms to a one-year, two-way contract with the Calgary Flames for the 2026–27 season on July 1, 2026.

== Career statistics ==
			Regular season					Playoffs
Season	Team	League	GP	G	A	Pts	PIM	GP	G	A	Pts	PIM
2016–17	Merritt Centennials	BCHL	2	0	0	0	0	—	—	—	—	—
2016–17	Langley Rivermen	BCHL	22	0	4	4	21	6	0	0	0	6
2017–18	Langley Rivermen	BCHL	53	1	12	13	85	6	0	1	1	4
2018–19	Langley Rivermen	BCHL	56	10	28	38	40	7	1	1	2	8
2019–20	Langley Rivermen	BCHL	52	11	38	49	72	4	0	4	4	8
2020–21	Minnesota State University	WCHA	28	4	10	14	16	—	—	—	—	—
2021–22	Minnesota State University	CCHA	44	9	22	31	32	—	—	—	—	—
2022–23	Minnesota State University	CCHA	39	8	27	35	30	—	—	—	—	—
2022–23	Nashville Predators	NHL	5	0	1	1	2	—	—	—	—	—
2023–24	Milwaukee Admirals	AHL	68	2	15	17	43	2	0	1	1	0
2024–25	Milwaukee Admirals	AHL	59	7	9	16	37	6	0	2	2	5
2025–26	Charlotte Checkers	AHL	52	3	14	17	24	1	0	0	0	10
NHL totals			5	0	1	1	2	—	—	—	—	—

== Awards and honours ==
Award	Year
College
All-WCHA Rookie Team	2021
All-CCHA First Team	2022, 2023
CCHA Defenseman of the Year	2022, 2023
AHCA West Second Team All-American	2023

Awards and achievements
Preceded by Award created	CCHA Defenseman of the Year; 2021–22, 2022–23	Succeeded by Kyle Looft
