= Akito Hirose =

Canadian ice hockey player

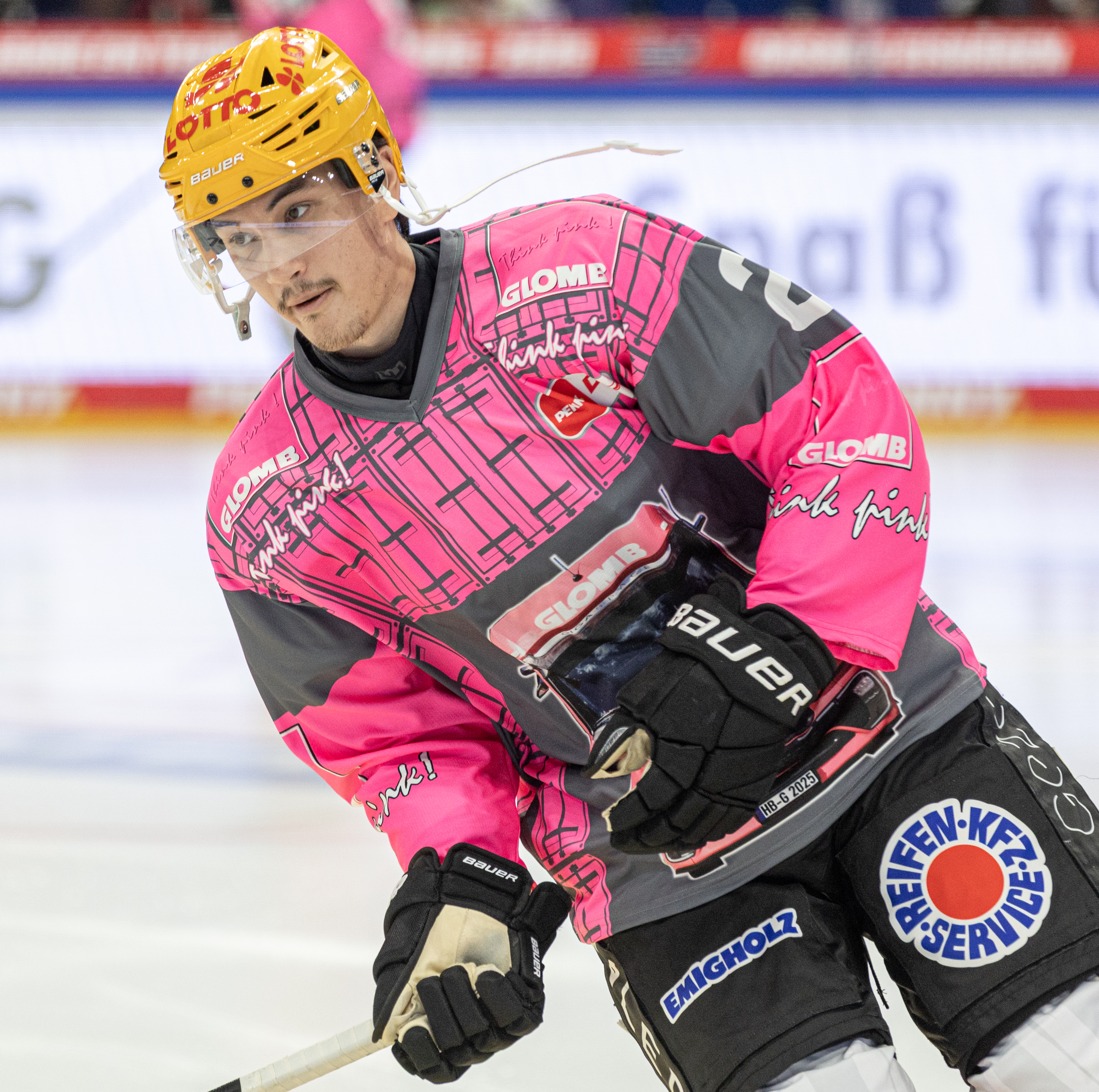
- Hirose with the Fischtown Pinguins in 2025
- Born: April 9, 1999 (age 27) Calgary, Alberta, Canada
- Height: 6 ft 0 in (183 cm)
- Weight: 170 lb (77 kg; 12 st 2 lb)
- Position: Defence
- Shoots: Left
- DEL team Former teams: Fischtown Pinguins; Vancouver Canucks
- NHL draft: Undrafted
- Playing career: 2023–present

Akito Hirose (born April 9, 1999) is a Canadian professional ice hockey defenceman for the Fischtown Pinguins of the Deutsche Eishockey Liga (DEL). He most recently played for the Abbotsford Canucks in the American Hockey League (AHL) while under contract to the Vancouver Canucks of the National Hockey League (NHL). He played college ice hockey at Minnesota State.

== Playing career ==
=== Junior ===
On September 7, 2019, Hirose was named captain of the Salmon Arm Silverbacks for the 2019–20 season. During his senior season with the Arm Silverbacks, he recorded nine goals and 42 assists in 57 games. He led the league in defenceman scoring and ranked third among all BCHL players with 42 assists. Following the season he was awarded the BCHL Defensive Player of the Year award.

He finished his career with 20 goals and 103 assists in 208 regular season games. On September 11, 2018, Hirose committed to play for Minnesota State.

=== College ===
Hirose began his collegiate career for Minnesota State during the 2020–21 season. During his freshman year, he recorded one goal and 14 assists in 28 games, ranking tied for second in the country among all freshmen defenceman. Following the season he was named to the All-WCHA Rookie Team and All-WCHA Third Team and was named the WCHA Rookie of the Year.

During the 2021–22 season, in his sophomore year, he recorded two goals and 24 assists in 38 games. During March and April, he recorded five points in eight games to average .625 points per game. He was subsequently named the CCHA Defenseman of the Month. He helped the Mavericks win the 2022 CCHA men's ice hockey tournament, their first CCHA tournament championship in program history, and received an automatic bid to the 2022 NCAA Division I men's ice hockey tournament. During the NCAA tournament, the Mavericks advanced to their first championship game in program history, where they lost to Denver 1–5.

During the 2022–23 season, in his junior year, he recorded four goals and 23 assists in 38 games. Following the season he was named to the All-CCHA Second Team. He finished his career at Minnesota State with seven goals, 61 assists, and a plus-53 rating in 104 games. During his time with the Mavericks, the team went 85–24–2, won three MacNaughton Cups, two Mason Cups, qualified for three NCAA tournaments, two Frozen Fours, and advanced to the national championship game once.

=== Professional ===
On March 29, 2023, Hirose signed a one-year, entry-level contract with the Vancouver Canucks. He made his NHL debut on April 2, in a game against the Los Angeles Kings. During the 2023 prospect development camp, the Canucks signed Hirose to an additional two-year contract.

Remaining as an unrestricted free agent, Hirose signed a one-year deal with the Fischtown Pinguins of the Deutsche Eishockey Liga (DEL) on September 24, 2025.

== Personal life ==
Hirose's brother, Taro, is also a professional ice hockey player for EHC Red Bull München of the DEL.

== Career statistics ==
			Regular season					Playoffs
Season	Team	League	GP	G	A	Pts	PIM	GP	G	A	Pts	PIM
2016–17	Salmon Arm Silverbacks	BCHL	44	2	8	10	18	—	—	—	—	—
2017–18	Salmon Arm Silverbacks	BCHL	55	5	27	32	24	4	0	0	0	4
2018–19	Salmon Arm Silverbacks	BCHL	52	4	26	30	17	5	0	4	4	0
2019–20	Salmon Arm Silverbacks	BCHL	57	9	42	51	18	4	0	3	3	0
2020–21	Minnesota State	WCHA	28	1	14	15	14	—	—	—	—	—
2021–22	Minnesota State	CCHA	38	2	24	26	8	—	—	—	—	—
2022–23	Minnesota State	CCHA	38	4	23	27	18	—	—	—	—	—
2022–23	Vancouver Canucks	NHL	7	0	3	3	4	—	—	—	—	—
2023–24	Vancouver Canucks	NHL	3	0	0	0	0	—	—	—	—	—
2023–24	Abbotsford Canucks	AHL	33	0	2	2	6	6	1	1	2	12
2024–25	Abbotsford Canucks	AHL	34	4	8	12	29	22	1	4	5	6
NHL totals			10	0	3	3	4	—	—	—	—	—

== Awards and honours ==
Honors	Year
College
All-WCHA Rookie Team	2021
All-WCHA Third Team	2021
WCHA Rookie of the Year	2021
All-CCHA Second Team	2023
AHL
Calder Cup Champion	2025
