= 2022–23 Bowling Green Falcons men's ice hockey season =

- Conference: 3rd CCHA
- Home ice: Slater Family Ice Arena

Rankings
- USCHO: NR
- USA Today: NR

Record
- Overall: 15–19–2
- Conference: 12–12–2
- Home: 9–11–1
- Road: 6–8–1

Coaches and captains
- Head coach: Ty Eigner
- Assistant coaches: Curtis Carr; Stavros Paskaris
- Captain: Alex Barber
- Alternate captain: Evan Dougherty

The 2022–23 Bowling Green Falcons men's ice hockey season was the 54th season of play for the program and the 44th in the Central Collegiate Hockey Association. The Falcons represented Bowling Green State University and were coached by Ty Eigner in his 4th season.

== Season ==
Bowling Green began the season with a decent performance in the first two weeks, splitting a pair of series with above-average opponents. In week 3, however, the team's hopes were dealt a massive blow when starting goaltender, Zack Rose, suffered a torn labrum and missed the remainder of the season. Coach Ty Eigner turned to Christian Stoever to man the pipes but the sophomore got off to a rocky start. After a week off, Stoever looked much more comfortable in the cage against Minnesota State and, though the team lost both games, the results were much more promising.

With Stoever settling into the starting role, the Falcons had to address another of their early-season problems; a lack of scoring. After scoring 6 goals in the opener, BG averaged just 2 goals per game over the next eight matches. Unsurprisingly, the team got off to a 2–7 start as a result. Once November rolled around, however, the offense began to coalesce around Austen Swankler and started scoring. After the poor start, the Falcons won six out of seven and brought themselves back up to .500. The team had a chance to establish itself a potential NCAA contender with a slate of 4 games against ranked teams to end the first half of their season. Unfortunately, BG lost each contest and were only close in one of the matches.

With their chances for an at-large bid near zero, Bowling Green kicked off the second half of its season with a 6-game winning streak that put it atop the CCHA standings. However, the Falcons were unable to keep their position and won just once in their final eight games. Despite the skid, the Falcons earned a home site for the quarterfinals and faced off against Ferris State. The two teams were evenly matched throughout both games though BG needed to score late to tie the score on both occasions. Unfortunately, the Bulldogs ended up with an overtime goal twice and upset the Falcons.

== Departures ==
Player	Position	Nationality	Cause
Cameron Babiak	Defenseman	United States	Left program (retired)
Gabriel Chicoine	Defenseman	Canada	Graduation (signed with Maine Mariners)
Chrystopher Collin	Forward	Canada	Left mid-season (signed with Trois-Rivières Lions)
Adam Conquest	Forward	United States	Transferred to Lindenwood
Sam Craggs	Forward	United States	Graduation (signed with Toledo Walleye)
Garrett Daly	Defenseman	United States	Transferred to St. Thomas
Chase Danol	Forward	United States	Left program (retired)
T. J. Lloyd	Defenseman	Canada	Transferred to Alaska
Trevor St. Jean	Forward	United States	Graduation (retired)

== Recruiting ==
Player	Position	Nationality	Age	Notes
Jack Blake	Defenseman	United States	21	Manhattan Beach, CA
Quinn Emerson	Forward	United States	21	Manhattan Beach, CA
Sam Evola	Goaltender	United States	21	Rochester, MI
Jaden Grant	Forward	United States	20	White Lake, MI
Chase Gresock	Forward	United States	24	Powell, OH; graduate transfer from Miami
Hunter Lellig	Defenseman	United States	23	Waterloo, IA; graduate transfer from Minnesota Duluth
Brett Pfoh	Forward	Canada	20	Port Moody, BC
Zach Vinnell	Defenseman	Canada	24	Cochrane, AB; transfer from Merrimack

== Roster ==
As of August 6, 2022.

No.	Nat.	Player	Class	Pos	Height	Weight	DoB	Hometown	Previous team	NHL rights
2	(Canada)	Ben Wozney	Sophomore	D	6' 2" (1.88 m)	174 lb (79 kg)	2001-06-15	Richmond, British Columbia	Penticton Vees (BCHL)	—
4	(Canada)	Zach Vinnell	Senior	D	6' 1" (1.85 m)	185 lb (84 kg)	1998-04-03	Cochrane, Alberta	Merrimack (HEA)	—
5	(United States)	Hunter Lellig	Graduate	D	6' 2" (1.88 m)	195 lb (88 kg)	1999-02-08	Waterloo, Iowa	Minnesota Duluth (NCHC)	—
6	(United States)	Alex Barber (C)	Graduate	F	5' 10" (1.78 m)	165 lb (75 kg)	1999-02-17	Dublin, Ohio	Central Illinois Flying Aces (USHL)	—
7	(United States)	Spencer Schneider	Sophomore	F	6' 0" (1.83 m)	190 lb (86 kg)	2000-09-11	Lakeville, Minnesota	Aberdeen Wings (NAHL)	—
8	(Canada)	Chrystopher Collin	Junior	F	5' 11" (1.8 m)	172 lb (78 kg)	1999-05-05	Montreal, Quebec	Edmundston Blizzard (MHL)	—
10	(United States)	Nathan Burke	Graduate	F	6' 2" (1.88 m)	190 lb (86 kg)	1998-12-21	Scottsdale, Arizona	Minnesota (Big Ten)	—
11	(United States)	Taylor Schneider	Graduate	F	6' 1" (1.85 m)	185 lb (84 kg)	1998-02-18	Lakeville, Minnesota	Dubuque Fighting Saints (USHL)	—
12	(United States)	Austen Swankler	Sophomore	F	6' 0" (1.83 m)	185 lb (84 kg)	2001-08-21	North Huntingdon, Pennsylvania	Erie Otters (OHL)	—
13	(Canada)	Brett Pfoh	Freshman	F	5' 11" (1.8 m)	179 lb (81 kg)	2002-01-22	Port Moody, British Columbia	Spruce Grove Saints (AJHL)	—
14	(United States)	Dalton Norris	Freshman	D	5' 10" (1.78 m)	183 lb (83 kg)	2001-09-28	Oxford, Michigan	Lincoln Stars (USHL)	—
15	(United States)	Evan Dougherty (A)	Graduate	F	6' 1" (1.85 m)	195 lb (88 kg)	1999-04-17	Kalamazoo, Michigan	Waterloo Black Hawks (USHL)	—
16	(Canada)	Brayden Krieger	Sophomore	F	6' 0" (1.83 m)	160 lb (73 kg)	2001-02-09	Elora, Ontario	Brooks Bandits (AJHL)	—
17	(Canada)	Ethan Scardina	Junior	F	6' 1" (1.85 m)	192 lb (87 kg)	2000-11-02	South Surrey, British Columbia	Nanaimo Clippers (BCHL)	—
18	(United States)	Quinn Emerson	Freshman	F	6' 0" (1.83 m)	180 lb (82 kg)	2001-03-12	Manhattan Beach, California	Wenatchee Wild (BCHL)	—
20	(Canada)	Ryan O'Hara	Sophomore	F	5' 10" (1.78 m)	175 lb (79 kg)	2001-07-18	Oakville, Ontario	Waterloo Black Hawks (USHL)	—
21	(Canada)	Seth Fyten	Junior	F	6' 2" (1.88 m)	187 lb (85 kg)	2000-11-23	Didsbury, Alberta	Spruce Grove Saints (AJHL)	—
22	(United States)	Adam Pitters	Senior	F	5' 11" (1.8 m)	180 lb (82 kg)	1999-02-09	Grosse Pointe, Michigan	Aberdeen Wings (NAHL)	—
23	(Canada)	Max Coyle	Senior	D	6' 1" (1.85 m)	195 lb (88 kg)	1998-01-29	Tillsonburg, Ontario	Alabama Huntsville (WCHA)	—
24	(Canada)	Eric Parker	Sophomore	D	6' 2" (1.88 m)	185 lb (84 kg)	2001-01-15	Calgary, Alberta	Okotoks Oilers (AJHL)	—
26	(United States)	Jack Blake	Freshman	D	6' 1" (1.85 m)	185 lb (84 kg)	2001-09-21	Manhattan Beach, California	Oakville Blades (OJHL)	—
27	(United States)	Chase Gresock	Graduate	F	6' 1" (1.85 m)	205 lb (93 kg)	1998-08-13	Powell, Ohio	Miami (NCHC)	—
28	(United States)	Jaden Grant	Freshman	F	6' 2" (1.88 m)	192 lb (87 kg)	2002-09-02	White Lake, Michigan	Youngstown Phantoms (USHL)	—
30	(United States)	Christian Stoever	Sophomore	G	6' 3" (1.91 m)	175 lb (79 kg)	2000-04-16	Northville, Michigan	New Jersey Titans (NAHL)	—
31	(United States)	Peter Eigner	Sophomore	G	6' 1" (1.85 m)	190 lb (86 kg)	2002-05-04	Bowling Green, Ohio	Tri-State (Midget AAA)	—
33	(Sweden)	Anton Malmström	Junior	D	6' 4" (1.93 m)	203 lb (92 kg)	2000-03-18	Österhaninge, Sweden	Djurgården J20 (J20 SuperElit)	—
35	(United States)	Salvatore Evola	Freshman	G	6' 0" (1.83 m)	175 lb (79 kg)	2001-04-24	Rochester, Michigan	Johnstown Tomahawks (NAHL)	—
40	(Canada)	Zack Rose	Senior	G	6' 1" (1.85 m)	185 lb (84 kg)	1999-07-03	Paradise, Newfoundland and Labrador	Victoria Grizzlies (BCHL)	—

== Standings ==
2022–23 Central Collegiate Hockey Association Standings
	Conference record										Overall record					
	GP	W	L	T	OTW	OTL	SW	PTS	GF	GA	GP	W	L	T	GF	GA
#12 Minnesota State †*	26	16	9	1	2	4	1	52	83	56	39	25	13	1	126	81
#13 Michigan Tech	26	15	7	4	0	1	0	50	68	54	39	24	11	4	103	88
Bowling Green	26	12	12	2	0	2	1	41	89	76	36	15	19	2	114	114
Northern Michigan	26	14	12	0	3	0	0	39	82	77	38	21	17	0	123	103
Bemidji State	26	12	11	3	3	1	2	39	73	63	36	14	17	5	94	97
Ferris State	26	9	14	3	1	2	3	34	62	91	37	14	19	4	92	131
St. Thomas	26	10	14	2	1	1	0	32	69	81	36	11	23	2	86	117
Lake Superior State	26	8	17	1	2	1	1	25	52	80	36	9	25	2	71	118
Championship: March 18, 2023 † indicates conference regular season champion (MacNaughton Cup) * indicates conference tournament champion (Mason Cup); Rankings: USCHO.com Top 20 Poll

== Schedule and results ==
Date	Time	Opponent^{#}	Rank^{#}	Site	TV	Decision	Result	Attendance	Record
Regular Season
October 1	6:07 PM	at Northern Michigan		Berry Events Center • Marquette, Michigan	FloHockey	Rose	W 6–4	2,967	1–0–0 (1–0–0)
October 2	6:07 PM	at Northern Michigan		Berry Events Center • Marquette, Michigan	FloHockey	Stoever	L 3–4 ^{OT}	2,064	1–1–0 (1–1–0)
October 7	7:00 PM	at Michigan State*		Munn Ice Arena • East Lansing, Michigan	BTN+	Rose	W 3–1	5,472	2–1–0
October 8	7:07 PM	Michigan State*		Slater Family Ice Arena • Bowling Green, Ohio	FloHockey	Rose	L 1–2	3,422	2–2–0
October 13	7:00 PM	at #18 Western Michigan*		Lawson Arena • Kalamazoo, Michigan		Rose	L 1–4	2,912	2–3–0
October 14	7:07 PM	#18 Western Michigan*		Slater Family Ice Arena • Bowling Green, Ohio	FloHockey	Stoever	L 2–8	2,816	2–4–0
October 22	7:00 PM	vs. Adrian		Slater Family Ice Arena • Bowling Green, Ohio (Exhibition)		Cancelled			
October 28	8:07 PM	at #8 Minnesota State		Mayo Clinic Health System Event Center • Mankato, Minnesota	KEYC	Stoever	L 2–3 ^{OT}	4,172	2–5–0 (1–2–0)
October 29	7:07 PM	at #8 Minnesota State		Mayo Clinic Health System Event Center • Mankato, Minnesota	KEYC	Stoever	L 2–4	4,007	2–6–0 (1–3–0)
November 4	7:07 PM	Michigan Tech		Slater Family Ice Arena • Bowling Green, Ohio	FloHockey	Stoever	L 2–3	2,350	2–7–0 (1–4–0)
November 5	7:07 PM	Michigan Tech		Slater Family Ice Arena • Bowling Green, Ohio	FloHockey	Stoever	W 6–1	2,872	3–7–0 (2–4–0)
November 11	7:07 PM	St. Thomas		Slater Family Ice Arena • Bowling Green, Ohio	FloHockey	Stoever	W 3–2	2,204	4–7–0 (3–4–0)
November 12	7:07 PM	St. Thomas		Slater Family Ice Arena • Bowling Green, Ohio	FloHockey	Stoever	W 3–2	2,467	5–7–0 (4–4–0)
November 18	7:07 PM	at Ferris State		Ewigleben Arena • Big Rapids, Michigan	FloHockey	Stoever	W 6–0	1,497	6–7–0 (5–4–0)
November 19	7:07 PM	at Ferris State		Ewigleben Arena • Big Rapids, Michigan	FloHockey	Stoever	L 1–4	1,904	6–8–0 (5–5–0)
December 2	7:07 PM	at Lake Superior State		Taffy Abel Arena • Sault Ste. Marie, Michigan	FloHockey	Rose	W 7–4	987	7–8–0 (6–5–0)
December 3	6:07 PM	at Lake Superior State		Taffy Abel Arena • Sault Ste. Marie, Michigan	FloHockey	Stoever	W 5–1	876	8–8–0 (7–5–0)
December 9	7:07 PM	#16 Minnesota State		Slater Family Ice Arena • Bowling Green, Ohio	FloHockey	Stoever	L 1–2	2,312	8–9–0 (7–6–0)
December 10	7:07 PM	#16 Minnesota State		Slater Family Ice Arena • Bowling Green, Ohio	FloHockey	Stoever	L 2–6	2,024	8–10–0 (7–7–0)
December 16	7:07 PM	#14 Ohio State*		Slater Family Ice Arena • Bowling Green, Ohio	FloHockey	Stoever	L 2–5	4,412	8–11–0
December 17	7:07 PM	at #14 Ohio State*		Value City Arena • Columbus, Ohio	BTN	Evola	L 4–9	5,271	8–12–0
December 29	7:07 PM	Rensselaer*		Slater Family Ice Arena • Bowling Green, Ohio	FloHockey	Stoever	W 3–1	1,678	9–12–0
December 30	7:07 PM	Rensselaer*		Slater Family Ice Arena • Bowling Green, Ohio	FloHockey	Stoever	W 5–2	1,989	10–12–0
January 6	7:07 PM	Lake Superior State		Slater Family Ice Arena • Bowling Green, Ohio	FloHockey	Evola	W 5–2	2,371	11–12–0 (8–7–0)
January 7	7:07 PM	Lake Superior State		Slater Family Ice Arena • Bowling Green, Ohio	FloHockey	Stoever	W 5–3	2,339	12–12–0 (9–7–0)
January 13	7:07 PM	Bemidji State		Slater Family Ice Arena • Bowling Green, Ohio	FloHockey	Stoever	W 4–2	3,009	13–12–0 (10–7–0)
January 14	7:07 PM	Bemidji State		Slater Family Ice Arena • Bowling Green, Ohio	FloHockey	Stoever	W 5–2	3,339	14–12–0 (11–7–0)
January 19	8:07 PM	at St. Thomas		St. Thomas Ice Arena • Mendota Heights, Minnesota	FloHockey	Stoever	L 2–4	490	14–13–0 (11–8–0)
January 20	8:07 PM	at St. Thomas		St. Thomas Ice Arena • Mendota Heights, Minnesota	FloHockey	Stoever	T 3–3 ^{SOW}	739	14–13–1 (11–8–1)
January 27	7:07 PM	USNTDP*		Slater Family Ice Arena • Bowling Green, Ohio (Exhibition)	FloHockey	Evola	L 3–6	2,602	
February 3	7:07 PM	Ferris State		Slater Family Ice Arena • Bowling Green, Ohio	FloHockey	Stoever	L 1–2	3,211	14–14–1 (11–9–1)
February 4	7:07 PM	Ferris State		Slater Family Ice Arena • Bowling Green, Ohio	FloHockey	Stoever	T 4–4 ^{SOL}	3,706	14–14–2 (11–9–2)
February 10	7:07 PM	at #12 Michigan Tech		MacInnes Student Ice Arena • Houghton, Michigan	FloHockey	Stoever	W 5–2	3,938	15–14–2 (12–9–2)
February 11	5:07 PM	at #12 Michigan Tech		MacInnes Student Ice Arena • Houghton, Michigan	FloHockey	Stoever	L 2–4	4,019	15–15–2 (12–10–2)
February 24	7:07 PM	Northern Michigan		Slater Family Ice Arena • Bowling Green, Ohio	FloHockey	Stoever	L 2–4	3,103	15–16–2 (12–11–2)
February 25	7:07 PM	Northern Michigan		Slater Family Ice Arena • Bowling Green, Ohio	FloHockey	Stoever	L 2–4	4,498	15–17–2 (12–12–2)
CCHA Tournament
March 3	7:07 PM	Ferris State*		Slater Family Ice Arena • Bowling Green, Ohio (Quarterfinal Game 1)	FloHockey	Stoever	L 3–4 ^{OT}	1,686	15–18–2
March 4	7:07 PM	Ferris State*		Slater Family Ice Arena • Bowling Green, Ohio (Quarterfinal Game 2)	FloHockey	Stoever	L 1–2 ^{OT}	1,638	15–19–2
*Non-conference game. ^{#}Rankings from USCHO.com Poll. All times are in Eastern Time. Source:

== Scoring statistics ==
Name	Position	Games	Goals	Assists	Points	PIM
Austen Swankler	C	35	19	25	44	43
Chase Gresock	C	36	11	20	31	12
Ryan O'Hara	F	36	11	19	30	25
Nathan Burke	F	36	17	12	29	12
Taylor Schneider	LW	36	11	13	24	12
Alex Barber	F	36	7	16	23	34
Zach Vinnell	LW	36	1	19	20	10
Ethan Scardina	F	31	11	5	16	14
Ben Wozney	D	36	2	13	15	14
Max Coyle	D	34	3	8	11	34
Dalton Norris	C/LW	36	2	9	11	8
Jaden Grant	F	36	3	5	8	12
Quinn Emerson	LW	28	3	4	7	14
Adam Pitters	F	27	2	5	7	32
Brayden Krieger	F	28	1	5	6	4
Anton Malmström	RW	33	3	3	6	16
Brett Pfoh	D	24	2	3	5	10
Evan Dougherty	D	32	2	2	4	12
Eric Parker	D	8	1	3	4	2
Hunter Lellig	F	34	0	4	4	34
Spencer Schneider	RW	24	0	3	3	8
Seth Fyten	D	7	2	0	2	6
Christian Stoever	G	31	0	1	1	2
Pete Eigner	G	1	0	0	0	0
Chrystopher Collin	D	2	0	0	0	0
Salvatore Evola	F	3	0	0	0	0
Zack Rose	G	5	0	0	0	0
Jack Blake	F	10	0	0	0	0
Total			114	197	311	370

== Goaltending statistics ==
Name	Games	Minutes	Wins	Losses	Ties	Goals Against	Saves	Shut Outs	SV %	GAA
Pete Eigner	2	2:29	0	0	0	0	4	0	1.000	0.00
Christian Stoever	31	1802:20	11	17	2	86	914	1	.914	2.86
Zack Rose	5	244:43	3	1	0	14	115	0	.891	3.44
Salvatore Evola	4	127:03	1	1	0	9	56	0	.862	4.25
Empty Net	-	21:53	-	-	-	5	-	-	-	-
Total	36	2198:08	15	19	2	114	1089	1	.909	3.11

== Rankings ==
Poll	Week																											
Poll	Pre	1	2	3	4	5	6	7	8	9	10	11	12	13	14	15	16	17	18	19	20	21	22	23	24	25	26	27 (Final)
USCHO.com	NR	-	NR	NR	NR	NR	NR	NR	NR	NR	NR	NR	NR	-	NR	NR	NR	NR	NR	NR	NR	NR	NR	NR	NR	NR	-	NR
USA Today	NR	NR	NR	NR	NR	NR	NR	NR	NR	NR	NR	NR	NR	NR	NR	NR	NR	NR	NR	NR	NR	NR	NR	NR	NR	NR	NR	NR

Note: USCHO did not release a poll in weeks 1, 13, or 26.

== Awards and honors ==
Player	Award	Ref
Austen Swankler	CCHA First Team	
Nathan Burke	CCHA Second Team	
Dalton Norris	CCHA Rookie Team	
