= 2023–24 Lake Superior State Lakers men's ice hockey season =

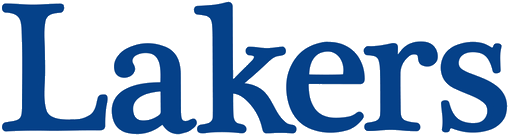
- Conference: 7th CCHA
- Home ice: Taffy Abel Arena

Rankings
- USCHO: NR
- USA Hockey: NR

Record
- Overall: 17–20–1
- Conference: 11–12–1
- Home: 9–6–1
- Road: 8–13–0
- Neutral: 0–1–0

Coaches and captains
- Head coach: Damon Whitten
- Assistant coaches: Mike York; D. J. Goldstein; Dwayne Roloson; Vincent Pietrangelo
- Captains: Artyom Borshyov; Harrison Roy
- Alternate captains: Grant Hindman; Dawson Tritt

The 2023–24 Lake Superior State Lakers men's ice hockey season was the 58th season of play for the program, the 51st at the Division I level and the 44th in the CCHA. The Lakers represented Lake Superior State University, played their home games at the Taffy Abel Arena and were coached by Damon Whitten in his 10th season.

== Season ==
While the Lakers were hoping for a repeat performance in the conference semifinals, they were completely outmatched by Bemidji State. The team was outshot nearly 3-to-1. Despite the loss, the Lakers advanced eleven spots in the national rankings.

== Departures ==
Player	Position	Nationality	Cause
Jacob Bengtsson	Defenseman	Sweden	Transferred to Boston College
Louis Boudon	Forward	France	Graduation (signed with Laval Rocket)
Spencer DenBeste	Forward	United States	Transferred to Aurora
Seth Eisele	Goaltender	United States	Graduate transfer to Omaha
Arvid Henrikson	Defenseman	Sweden	Graduation (signed with San Jose Barracuda)
Jack Jeffers	Forward	Canada	Graduation (signed with Savannah Ghost Pirates)
Logan Jenuwine	Forward	United States	Graduate transfer to American International
Jared Kucharek	Defenseman	United States	Graduation (signed with Iowa Heartlanders)
Sebastian Miedema	Defenseman	Sweden	Left program (retired)
Brandon Puricelli	Forward	United States	Graduation (signed with Iowa Heartlanders)
Jake Willets	Defenseman	United States	Graduation (signed with Toledo Walleye)

== Recruiting ==
Player	Position	Nationality	Age	Notes
Carter Batchelder	Forward	United States	20	Savage, MN
Jack Blanchett	Defenseman	United States	20	Monroe, MI
Evan Bushy	Defenseman	United States	21	Mankato, MN
Jacob Conrad	Defenseman	United States	21	Green Bay, WI
William Håkansson	Goaltender	Sweden	20	Oskarshamn, SWE
John Herrington	Forward	Canada	21	Hudson's Hope, BC
Cam Kungle	Defenseman	Canada	21	Red Deer, AB
Luke Levandowski	Forward	United States	21	Rosemount, MN
Reagan Milburn	Forward	Canada	20	Kamloops, BC
Branden Piku	Forward	United States	21	Harrison Township, MI
Ross Roloson	Defenseman	United States	21	Woodbury, MN
Nate Schweitzer	Defenseman	United States	21	Champlin, MN; transfer from Colorado College
Sasha Teleguine	Forward	United States	21	North Attleborough, MA; transfer from Connecticut

== Roster ==
As of September 18, 2023.

No.	Nat.	Player	Class	Pos	Height	Weight	DoB	Hometown	Previous team	NHL rights
1	(Canada)	Ethan Langenegger	Senior	G	6' 0" (1.83 m)	187 lb (85 kg)	2000-09-10	Kamloops, British Columbia	Salmon Arm Silverbacks (BCHL)	—
2	(United States)	Bryan Huggins	Sophomore	D	5' 11" (1.8 m)	180 lb (82 kg)	2002-03-26	Grand Rapids, Michigan	Fargo Force (USHL)	—
3	(United States)	Tyler Williams	Senior	F	5' 7" (1.7 m)	175 lb (79 kg)	2000-05-16	South Lyon, Michigan	Nanaimo Clippers (BCHL)	—
4	(United States)	Jacob Conrad	Freshman	D	5' 11" (1.8 m)	180 lb (82 kg)	2002-05-18	Green Bay, Wisconsin	Fairbanks Ice Dogs (NAHL)	—
5	(United States)	Evan Bushy	Freshman	D	6' 1" (1.85 m)	195 lb (88 kg)	2002-03-26	Mankato, Minnesota	Trail Smoke Eaters (BCHL)	—
6	(United States)	Ross Roloson	Freshman	D	5' 11" (1.8 m)	175 lb (79 kg)	2003-01-30	Woodbury, Minnesota	Surrey Eagles (BCHL)	—
7	(United States)	Branden Piku	Freshman	F	5' 8" (1.73 m)	165 lb (75 kg)	2002-08-25	Harrison Township, Michigan	Maryland Black Bears (NAHL)	—
8	(United States)	Harrison Roy (C)	Senior	F	6' 1" (1.85 m)	194 lb (88 kg)	2000-01-17	Lakeville, Massachusetts	Boston College (HEA)	—
9	(Canada)	Connor Milburn	Sophomore	F	6' 4" (1.93 m)	180 lb (82 kg)	2001-04-11	Kamloops, British Columbia	Chilliwack Chiefs (BCHL)	—
10	(United States)	Sasha Teleguine	Sophomore	F	5' 10" (1.78 m)	180 lb (82 kg)	2002-09-17	North Attleborough, Massachusetts	Chilliwack Chiefs (BCHL)	—
11	(United States)	Dawson Tritt (A)	Junior	F	6' 2" (1.88 m)	180 lb (82 kg)	2000-09-01	Spokane, Washington	Lone Star Brahmas (NAHL)	—
12	(Canada)	Reagan Milburn	Freshman	F	6' 0" (1.83 m)	190 lb (86 kg)	2003-02-13	Kamloops, British Columbia	Vernon Vipers (BCHL)	—
14	(United States)	Nate Schweitzer	Junior	D	6' 0" (1.83 m)	186 lb (84 kg)	2002-02-21	Champlin, Minnesota	Colorado College (NCHC)	—
15	(United States)	Jared Westcott	Senior	F	6' 1" (1.85 m)	200 lb (91 kg)	1999-07-18	Imperial, Missouri	Penn State (Big Ten)	—
16	(United States)	Jack Blanchett	Freshman	F	5' 11" (1.8 m)	185 lb (84 kg)	2003-05-12	Monroe, Michigan	Powell River Kings (BCHL)	—
17	(United States)	Luke Levandowski	Freshman	F	6' 0" (1.83 m)	165 lb (75 kg)	2002-09-26	Rosemount, Minnesota	Wisconsin Windigo (NAHL)	—
18	(United States)	Carter Batchelder	Freshman	F	5' 10" (1.78 m)	175 lb (79 kg)	2003-02-25	Savage, Minnesota	Des Moines Buccaneers (USHL)	—
19	(United States)	Joshua Wildauer	Senior	F	5' 8" (1.73 m)	170 lb (77 kg)	1999-06-16	Dearborn Heights, Michigan	Coquitlam Express (BCHL)	—
20	(United States)	Grant Hindman (A)	Junior	D	6' 0" (1.83 m)	200 lb (91 kg)	2002-05-16	Oakland, Michigan	Youngstown Phantoms (USHL)	—
21	(United States)	Jordan Venegoni	Junior	F	6' 0" (1.83 m)	185 lb (84 kg)	2000-08-16	Livonia, Michigan	Amarillo Bulls (NAHL)	—
22	(Germany)	Timo Bakos	Junior	F	6' 1" (1.85 m)	194 lb (88 kg)	2000-07-28	Augsburg, Germany	Starbulls Rosenheim (Oberliga)	—
23	(Belarus)	Artyom Borshyov (C)	Senior	D	6' 3" (1.91 m)	210 lb (95 kg)	2000-08-22	Vitebsk, Belarus	Northern Cyclones (NCDC)	—
24	(Canada)	Cam Kungle	Freshman	D	6' 3" (1.91 m)	202 lb (92 kg)	2002-03-28	Red Deer, Alberta	Cranbrook Bucks (BCHL)	—
25	(Canada)	Jeremy Gervais	Senior	D	5' 11" (1.8 m)	180 lb (82 kg)	1999-01-09	Prince George, British Columbia	Salmon Arm Silverbacks (BCHL)	—
26	(Canada)	Cole Craft	Junior	F	6' 2" (1.88 m)	195 lb (88 kg)	2001-06-29	North Bay, Ontario	Lincoln Stars (USHL)	—
27	(United States)	Benito Posa	Senior	F	6' 1" (1.85 m)	190 lb (86 kg)	1999-01-16	Flint, Michigan	Des Moines Buccaneers (USHL)	—
28	(Canada)	John Herrington	Freshman	D	5' 11" (1.8 m)	180 lb (82 kg)	2002-04-19	Hudson's Hope, British Columbia	Prince George Spruce Kings (BCHL)	—
29	(United States)	Brett Roloson	Junior	F	5' 11" (1.8 m)	160 lb (73 kg)	2000-12-29	Worcester, Massachusetts	Minot Minotauros (NAHL)	—
30	(Canada)	Easton Hesse	Junior	G	6' 0" (1.83 m)	175 lb (79 kg)	2000-06-28	Beaumont, Alberta	Bonnyville Pontiacs (AJHL)	—
31	(Sweden)	William Håkansson	Freshman	G	6' 0" (1.83 m)	190 lb (86 kg)	2003-03-24	Oskarshamn, Sweden	Maryland Black Bears (NAHL)	—

== Standings ==
2023–24 Central Collegiate Hockey Association Standings
	Conference record										Overall record					
	GP	W	L	T	OTW	OTL	SW	PTS	GF	GA	GP	W	L	T	GF	GA
Bemidji State †	24	15	7	2	2	1	2	48	82	64	38	20	16	2	117	111
St. Thomas	24	12	11	1	0	2	0	39	68	62	37	15	20	2	97	105
#19 Michigan Tech*	24	12	10	2	1	2	0	39	63	54	40	19	15	6	109	102
Minnesota State	24	12	10	2	2	1	1	38	73	62	37	18	15	4	111	96
Northern Michigan	24	10	10	4	1	1	2	36	57	67	34	12	16	6	83	105
Bowling Green	24	11	12	1	1	1	1	35	60	69	36	13	22	1	86	116
Lake Superior State	24	11	12	1	2	2	0	34	79	73	38	17	20	1	114	113
Ferris State	24	6	17	1	3	2	1	19	49	80	36	10	24	2	83	125
Augustana ^	0	0	0	0	0	0	0	0	0	0	34	12	18	4	90	105
Championship: March 22, 2024 † indicates conference regular season champion (MacNaughton Cup) * indicates conference tournament champion (Mason Cup)^ Augustana is playing a transition schedule of 16 games against conference opponents that are not counted in the standings Rankings: USCHO.com Top 20 Poll

== Schedule and results ==
Date	Time	Opponent^{#}	Rank^{#}	Site	TV	Decision	Result	Attendance	Record
Regular Season
October 7	4:00 pm	at #9 Michigan State*		Munn Ice Arena • East Lansing, Michigan	BTN+	Langenegger	L 2–5	6,555	0–1–0
October 8	4:00 pm	at #9 Michigan State*		Munn Ice Arena • East Lansing, Michigan	BTN+	Langenegger	L 2–4	6,555	0–2–0
October 13	7:07 pm	Alaska Anchorage*		Taffy Abel Arena • Sault Ste. Marie, Michigan	FloHockey	Langenegger	W 5–1	1,429	1–2–0
October 14	6:07 pm	Alaska Anchorage*		Taffy Abel Arena • Sault Ste. Marie, Michigan	FloHockey	Langenegger	L 2–3	1,589	1–3–0
October 21	6:07 pm	Simon Fraser*		Taffy Abel Arena • Sault Ste. Marie, Michigan (Exhibition)	FloHockey	Håkansson	W 6–4	947	
October 27	7:00 pm	at Clarkson*		Cheel Arena • Potsdam, New York	ESPN+	Langenegger	W 4–3 ^{OT}	2,519	2–3–0
October 28	7:00 pm	at St. Lawrence*		Appleton Arena • Canton, New York	ESPN+	Langenegger	W 5–2	—	3–3–0
November 3	7:07 pm	Bemidji State		Taffy Abel Arena • Sault Ste. Marie, Michigan	FloHockey	Langenegger	W 4–3 ^{OT}	1,231	4–3–0 (1–0–0)
November 4	6:07 pm	Bemidji State		Taffy Abel Arena • Sault Ste. Marie, Michigan	FloHockey	Langenegger	W 5–1	1,313	5–3–0 (2–0–0)
November 10	7:07 pm	at Northern Michigan		Berry Events Center • Marquette, Michigan	FloHockey	Langenegger	L 4–6	3,239	5–4–0 (2–1–0)
November 11	6:07 pm	at Northern Michigan		Berry Events Center • Marquette, Michigan	FloHockey	Langenegger	L 3–4 ^{OT}	3,774	5–5–0 (2–2–0)
November 17	7:07 pm	Bowling Green		Taffy Abel Arena • Sault Ste. Marie, Michigan	FloHockey	Langenegger	L 3–5	831	5–6–0 (2–3–0)
November 17	6:07 pm	Bowling Green		Taffy Abel Arena • Sault Ste. Marie, Michigan	FloHockey	Håkansson	W 4–3 ^{OT}	1,059	6–6–0 (3–3–0)
November 24	8:07 pm	at St. Thomas		St. Thomas Ice Arena • Mendota Heights, Minnesota	FloHockey	Langenegger	L 2–4	784	6–7–0 (3–4–0)
November 25	7:07 pm	at St. Thomas		St. Thomas Ice Arena • Mendota Heights, Minnesota	FloHockey	Langenegger	W 3–1	826	7–7–0 (4–4–0)
December 1	7:07 pm	Minnesota State		Taffy Abel Arena • Sault Ste. Marie, Michigan	FloHockey	Langenegger	T 2–2 ^{SOL}	930	7–7–1 (4–4–1)
December 2	7:07 pm	Minnesota State		Taffy Abel Arena • Sault Ste. Marie, Michigan	FloHockey	Langenegger	L 3–4	892	7–8–1 (4–5–1)
December 8	8:07 pm	at Bemidji State		Sanford Center • Bemidji, Minnesota	FloHockey	Langenegger	L 1–7	1,687	7–9–1 (4–6–1)
December 9	8:07 pm	at Bemidji State		Sanford Center • Bemidji, Minnesota	FloHockey	Langenegger	W 6–1	1,536	8–9–1 (5–6–1)
December 16	6:07 pm	at Ferris State		Ewigleben Arena • Big Rapids, Michigan	FloHockey	Langenegger	W 5–1	1,492	9–9–1 (6–6–1)
Ledyard Bank Classic
December 29	7:30 PM	at Dartmouth*		Thompson Arena • Hanover, New Hampshire (Ledyard Bank Semifinal)	ESPN+	Langenegger	L 0–4	3,083	9–10–1
December 30	4:00 pm	vs. #18 RIT*		Thompson Arena • Hanover, New Hampshire (Ledyard Bank Consolation Game)	ESPN+	Håkansson	L 2–4	2,310	9–11–1
January 12	7:07 pm	Northern Michigan		Taffy Abel Arena • Sault Ste. Marie, Michigan	FloHockey	Langenegger	W 5–1	995	10–11–1 (7–6–1)
January 13	6:07 pm	Northern Michigan		Taffy Abel Arena • Sault Ste. Marie, Michigan	FloHockey	Langenegger	W 5–2	877	11–11–1 (8–6–1)
January 19	7:07 pm	at Ferris State		Ewigleben Arena • Big Rapids, Michigan	FloHockey	Langenegger	L 3–5	2,040	11–12–1 (8–7–1)
January 20	6:07 pm	Ferris State		Taffy Abel Arena • Sault Ste. Marie, Michigan	FloHockey	Langenegger	L 2–3 ^{OT}	1,112	11–13–1 (8–8–1)
January 26	7:07 pm	Michigan Tech		Taffy Abel Arena • Sault Ste. Marie, Michigan	FloHockey	Hesse	W 3–1	1,126	12–13–1 (9–8–1)
January 27	7:07 pm	Michigan Tech		Taffy Abel Arena • Sault Ste. Marie, Michigan	FloHockey	Hesse	L 0–1	1,602	12–14–1 (9–9–1)
February 9	7:07 pm	at Bowling Green		Slater Family Ice Arena • Bowling Green, Ohio	FloHockey	Langenegger	L 3–6	2,202	12–15–1 (9–10–1)
February 10	7:07 pm	at Bowling Green		Slater Family Ice Arena • Bowling Green, Ohio	FloHockey	Langenegger	L 2–4	3,012	12–16–1 (9–11–1)
February 16	7:07 pm	Augustana		Taffy Abel Arena • Sault Ste. Marie, Michigan	FloHockey	Hesse	W 3–0	742	13–16–1
February 17	7:07 pm	Augustana		Taffy Abel Arena • Sault Ste. Marie, Michigan	FloHockey	Langenegger	L 0–3	1,015	13–17–1
February 23	8:07 pm	at Minnesota State		Mayo Clinic Health System Event Center • Mankato, Minnesota	FloHockey	Langenegger	W 4–3	4,681	14–17–1 (10–11–1)
February 24	7:07 pm	at Minnesota State		Mayo Clinic Health System Event Center • Mankato, Minnesota	FloHockey	Hesse	L 3–4	4,935	14–18–1 (10–12–1)
March 1	7:07 pm	Ferris State		Taffy Abel Arena • Sault Ste. Marie, Michigan	FloHockey	Langenegger	W 4–1	1,122	15–18–1 (11–12–1)
CCHA Tournament
March 8	8:07 pm	at St. Thomas*		St. Thomas Ice Arena • Mendota Heights, Minnesota (Quarterfinal Game 1)	FloHockey	Langenegger	W 4–1	506	16–18–1
March 9	7:07 pm	at St. Thomas*		St. Thomas Ice Arena • Mendota Heights, Minnesota (Quarterfinal Game 2)	FloHockey	Langenegger	L 2–4	495	16–19–1
March 10	6:07 pm	at St. Thomas*		St. Thomas Ice Arena • Mendota Heights, Minnesota (Quarterfinal Game 3)	FloHockey	Langenegger	W 3–2	437	17–19–1
March 16	8:07 pm	at #20т Bemidji State*		Sanford Center • Bemidji, Minnesota (Semifinal)	FloHockey	Langenegger	L 1–4	3,048	17–20–1
*Non-conference game. ^{#}Rankings from USCHO.com Poll. All times are in Eastern Time. Source:

== Scoring statistics ==
Name	Position	Games	Goals	Assists	Points	PIM
Jared Westcott	F	38	18	18	36	51
Connor Millburn	F	34	16	19	35	30
Dawson Tritt	F	38	13	12	25	14
Timo Bakos	F	38	9	15	24	6
Harrison Roy	F	38	8	16	24	8
John Herrington	C	37	9	11	20	12
Carter Batchelder	C	34	8	7	15	14
Evan Bushy	D	37	1	14	15	18
Ross Roloson	D	37	4	10	14	4
Nate Schweitzer	D	38	3	10	13	24
Branden Piku	F	25	7	4	11	14
Cam Kungle	D	37	1	8	9	33
Reagan Milburn	F	22	2	6	8	10
Luke Levandowski	F	29	2	6	8	4
Artyom Borshyov	D	36	2	6	8	12
Brett Roloson	F	15	1	5	6	6
Grant Hindman	D	36	1	4	5	8
Joshua Wildauer	C	15	0	5	5	4
Jack Blanchett	D	12	2	2	4	8
Cole Craft	RW	17	2	2	4	4
Bryan Huggins	D	30	0	4	4	6
Tyler Williams	C	21	3	0	3	6
Sasha Teleguine	F	34	2	1	3	29
Jordan Venegoni	F	18	0	1	1	8
Jeremy Gervais	D	2	0	0	0	0
Benito Posa	F	4	0	0	0	2
William Håkansson	G	5	0	0	0	0
Easton Hesse	G	8	0	0	0	0
Ethan Langenegger	G	33	0	0	0	0
Total			114	186	300	347

== Goaltending statistics ==
Name	Games	Minutes	Wins	Losses	Ties	Goals Against	Saves	Shut Outs	SV %	GAA
Easton Hesse	8	292:00	2	2	0	7	156	1	.957	1.44
Ethan Langenegger	33	1827:53	14	17	1	87	873	0	.909	2.86
William Håkansson	5	136:42	1	1	0	11	55	0	.833	4.83
Empty Net	-	34:29	-	-	-	8	-	-	-	-
Total	38	2291:04	17	20	1	113	1086	1	.906	2.96

== Rankings ==
Poll	Week																										
Poll	Pre	1	2	3	4	5	6	7	8	9	10	11	12	13	14	15	16	17	18	19	20	21	22	23	24	25	26 (Final)
USCHO.com	NR	NR	NR	NR	NR	NR	NR	NR	NR	NR	NR	–	NR	NR	NR	NR	NR	NR	NR	NR	NR	NR	NR	NR	NR	–	NR
USA Hockey	NR	NR	NR	NR	NR	NR	NR	NR	NR	NR	NR	NR	–	NR	NR	NR	NR	NR	NR	NR	NR	NR	NR	NR	NR	NR	NR

Note: USCHO did not release a poll in weeks 11 and 25.
Note: USA Hockey did not release a poll in week 12.

== Awards and honors ==
Player	Award	Ref
Connor Milburn	CCHA Best Defensive Forward	
Jared Westcott	CCHA First Team	
Connor Milburn	CCHA Second Team	
John Herrington	CCHA Rookie Team	
