= 2023–24 Bowling Green Falcons men's ice hockey season =

- Conference: 6th CCHA
- Home ice: Slater Family Ice Arena

Rankings
- USCHO: NR
- USA Hockey: NR

Record
- Overall: 13–22–1
- Conference: 11–12–1
- Home: 7–10–0
- Road: 6–12–1

Coaches and captains
- Head coach: Ty Eigner
- Assistant coaches: Curtis Carr; Stavros Paskaris; Dylan Schoen; Buddy Powers

The 2023–24 Bowling Green Falcons men's ice hockey season was the 55th season of play for the program and the 45th in the CCHA. The Falcons represented Bowling Green State University, played their home games at the Slater Family Ice Arena and were coached by Ty Eigner in his 5th season.

== Season ==
Just before the start of the season the team's leading scorer from last season, Austen Swankler, abruptly left school and entered the transfer portal. Shortly afterwards, head coach Ty Eigner was placed on leave and three players were suspended due hazing allegations. A little over a month later, an independent investigation discovered that older players had provided alcohol for underaged persons at an off-campus event. At the time there was no evidence that Eigner or any of his staff were aware of the behavior so the coach was reinstated. However, due to the nature of the violation, the school's athletic director, Derek van der Merwe, began to directly oversee the program while requiring the coaching staff to receive additional training to prevent a recurrence. This incident was particularly galling for Bowling Green as the school was still recovering from the 2021 death of Stone Foltz that led to hazing becoming a felony under Ohio state law.

The season progressed under a cloud and saw the get off to a very poor start. With the offense missing six of its top seven scorers from a year ago, the team desperately needed to be coached into a cohesive unit, something Eigner could not do while suspended. As a result, the Falcons didn't show much ability to score until November. The defense, too, suffered early and returning starter Christian Stoever was soon replaced by Cole Moore in goal. As a freshman, it took Moore took some time to get up to speed. He started to look like he had sorted himself out right about the same time that the offense began to come out of its hibernation. Beginning in mid-November, Bowling Green started acting like a functional team and was able to earn a split or better for four consecutive weeks. The steady play from the Falcons had them in the middle of the CCHA standings by Christmas.

The Falcons opened the second half of their season with a pair of defeats to Ohio State. The losses gave BG a terrible non-conference record and left the Falcons only one path to the NCAA tournament: a conference championship. The team took that to heart and once they resumed conference play, Bowling Green rolled over their competition. Over a month-long stretch, the Falcons went 6–1–1 and put themselves within shouting distance of a 1st-place finish. The offense looked better than it had all season and didn't even stop when their leading scorer, Ryan O'Hara, was injured on February 3.

Just when it appeared that the team was heading for a home stand in the postseason and a better than average chance at a championship, the offense vanished. Bowling Green scored just 2 goals in its final four games. The four losses dropped the Falcons to 6th in the standings and forced them to hit the road for the quarterfinals. The opening match with Michigan Tech saw more of the same with the team getting shutout for the third time in as many weeks. The offense did show some signs of life in the third period and was able to continue that trend into the rematch. With their season on the line, the Falcons opened strong with two goals in the first 8 minutes. A lapse at the start of the second allowed Tech to take the lead but BG was able to regain the lead in the middle of the period. With their narrow lead, Bowling Green could ill-afford any mistakes but that's exactly what happened. The Falcons tool a pair of penalties in rapid succession to give the Huskies a lengthy 2-man advantage. Michigan Tech scored twice more before the third to retake the lead. BG tied the game once more at the start of the final frame but then continued to commit infractions. The Falcons were whistled for two minors in the third and while they were able to kill of the first, Tech netted its fourth power play goal of the game on the latter and swept the Falcons out of the postseason.

Shortly after the conclusion of the season, Eigner was fired.

== Departures ==
Player	Position	Nationality	Cause
Alex Barber	Forward	United States	Graduation (signed with Jokers de Cergy-Pontoise)
Nathan Burke	Forward	United States	Graduation (signed with Orlando Solar Bears)
Max Coyle	Defenseman	Canada	Graduation (signed with Indy Fuel)
Evan Dougherty	Forward	United States	Graduation (signed with Atlanta Gladiators)
Chase Gresock	Forward	United States	Graduation (signed with San Jose Barracuda)
Hunter Lellig	Defenseman	United States	Graduation (retired)
Anton Malmström	Defenseman	Sweden	Signed professional contract (St. Louis Blues)
Adam Pitters	Forward	United States	Graduate transfer to Long Island
Zack Rose	Goaltender	Canada	Graduate transfer to Augustana
Taylor Schneider	Forward	United States	Graduation (retired)
Austen Swankler	Forward	United States	Transferred to Michigan Tech
Zach Vinnell	Defenseman	Canada	Graduation (signed with Indy Fuel)

== Recruiting ==
Player	Position	Nationality	Age	Notes
Michael Bevilacqua	Defenseman	United States	20	Hamburg, NY
Ben Doran	Forward	United States	20	Chesterfield, MO
Spencer Kersten	Forward	Canada	23	Waterloo, ON; graduate transfer from Princeton
Breck McKinley	Defenseman	Canada	19	St. Albert, AB
Cole Moore	Goaltender	Canada	20	Toronto, ON
Josh Nodler	Forward	United States	22	Oak Park, MI; graduate transfer from Massachusetts; selected 150th overall in 2019
Nicholas O'Hanisain	Defenseman	United States	21	Detroit, MI
Owen Ozar	Forward	Canada	23	Prince Albert, SK; transfer from Denver
Tommy Pasanen	Defenseman	Finland	22	Schweinfurt, GER; transfer from Clarkson
Adam Schankula	Forward	Canada	20	Newmarket, ON; joined mid-season
Brandon Santa Juana	Forward	Canada	21	Langley, BC
Gustav Stjernberg	Defenseman	Sweden	20	Enebyberg, SWE
Brody Waters	Forward	Canada	21	Heidelberg, ON

== Roster ==
As of September 18, 2023.

No.	Nat.	Player	Class	Pos	Height	Weight	DoB	Hometown	Previous team	NHL rights
2	(Canada)	Ben Wozney	Junior	D	6' 4" (1.93 m)	194 lb (88 kg)	2001-06-15	Richmond, British Columbia	Penticton Vees (BCHL)	—
4	(United States)	Nick O'Hanisain	Freshman	D	5' 11" (1.8 m)	181 lb (82 kg)	2002-02-09	Detroit, Michigan	Minot Minotauros (NAHL)	—
5	(Sweden)	Gustav Stjernberg	Freshman	D	6' 4" (1.93 m)	208 lb (94 kg)	2002-10-12	Enebyberg, Sweden	Des Moines Buccaneers (USHL)	—
6	(United States)	Michael Bevilacqua	Freshman	D	6' 0" (1.83 m)	187 lb (85 kg)	2003-01-26	Hamburg, New York	Des Moines Buccaneers (USHL)	—
7	(United States)	Spencer Schneider	Junior	F	5' 11" (1.8 m)	159 lb (72 kg)	2000-09-11	Lakeville, Minnesota	Aberdeen Wings (NAHL)	—
8	(Canada)	Brandon Santa Juana	Freshman	F	5' 8" (1.73 m)	173 lb (78 kg)	2002-08-05	Langley, British Columbia	Salmon Arm Silverbacks (BCHL)	—
10	(United States)	Josh Nodler	Graduate	F	5' 10" (1.78 m)	195 lb (88 kg)	2001-04-27	Oak Park, Michigan	Massachusetts (HEA)	CGY, 150th overall 2019
11	(Canada)	Adam Schankula	Freshman	F	6' 2" (1.88 m)	190 lb (86 kg)	2003-06-21	Newmarket, Ontario	Youngstown Phantoms (USHL)	—
13	(Canada)	Brett Pfoh	Sophomore	F	5' 11" (1.8 m)	179 lb (81 kg)	2002-01-22	Port Moody, British Columbia	Spruce Grove Saints (AJHL)	—
14	(United States)	Dalton Norris	Sophomore	D	5' 10" (1.78 m)	183 lb (83 kg)	2001-09-28	Oxford, Michigan	Lincoln Stars (USHL)	—
15	(Canada)	Spencer Kersten	Graduate	F	5' 10" (1.78 m)	185 lb (84 kg)	2000-05-16	Waterloo, Ontario	Princeton (ECAC)	—
16	(Canada)	Brayden Krieger	Junior	F	6' 0" (1.83 m)	160 lb (73 kg)	2001-02-09	Elora, Ontario	Brooks Bandits (AJHL)	—
17	(Canada)	Ethan Scardina	Senior	F	6' 1" (1.85 m)	192 lb (87 kg)	2000-11-02	South Surrey, British Columbia	Nanaimo Clippers (BCHL)	—
18	(United States)	Quinn Emerson	Sophomore	F	6' 0" (1.83 m)	180 lb (82 kg)	2001-03-12	Manhattan Beach, California	Wenatchee Wild (BCHL)	—
20	(Canada)	Ryan O'Hara	Junior	F	5' 10" (1.78 m)	175 lb (79 kg)	2001-07-18	Oakville, Ontario	Waterloo Black Hawks (USHL)	—
21	(Canada)	Seth Fyten	Senior	F	6' 2" (1.88 m)	187 lb (85 kg)	2000-11-23	Didsbury, Alberta	Spruce Grove Saints (AJHL)	—
22	(Canada)	Owen Ozar	Junior	F	5' 9" (1.75 m)	156 lb (71 kg)	2000-04-05	Prince Albert, Saskatchewan	Denver (NCHC)	—
23	(United States)	Ben Doran	Freshman	F	5' 11" (1.8 m)	177 lb (80 kg)	2003-02-27	Chesterfield, Missouri	Sioux City Musketeers (USHL)	—
24	(Canada)	Eric Parker	Sophomore	D	6' 2" (1.88 m)	185 lb (84 kg)	2001-01-15	Calgary, Alberta	Okotoks Oilers (AJHL)	—
25	(Germany)	Tommy Pasanen	Senior	D	6' 4" (1.93 m)	218 lb (99 kg)	2001-07-30	Schweinfurt, Germany	Clarkson (ECAC)	—
26	(United States)	Jack Blake	Sophomore	D	6' 1" (1.85 m)	185 lb (84 kg)	2001-09-21	Manhattan Beach, California	Oakville Blades (OJHL)	—
27	(Canada)	Breck McKinley	Freshman	D	5' 9" (1.75 m)	175 lb (79 kg)	2003-10-08	St. Albert, Alberta	Spruce Grove Saints (AJHL)	—
28	(United States)	Jaden Grant	Sophomore	F	6' 2" (1.88 m)	192 lb (87 kg)	2002-09-02	White Lake, Michigan	Youngstown Phantoms (USHL)	—
29	(Canada)	Brody Waters	Freshman	F	6' 2" (1.88 m)	203 lb (92 kg)	2002-04-09	Heidelberg, Ontario	Nanaimo Clippers (BCHL)	—
30	(United States)	Christian Stoever	Junior	G	6' 3" (1.91 m)	175 lb (79 kg)	2000-04-16	Northville, Michigan	New Jersey Titans (NAHL)	—
31	(United States)	Peter Eigner	Junior	G	6' 1" (1.85 m)	190 lb (86 kg)	2002-05-04	Bowling Green, Ohio	Tri-State (Midget AAA)	—
34	(Canada)	Cole More	Freshman	G	6' 6" (1.98 m)	198 lb (90 kg)	2003-06-04	Toronto, Ontario	Aberdeen Wings (NAHL)	—
35	(United States)	Salvatore Evola	Sophomore	G	6' 0" (1.83 m)	175 lb (79 kg)	2001-04-24	Rochester, Michigan	Johnstown Tomahawks (NAHL)	—

== Standings ==
2023–24 Central Collegiate Hockey Association Standings
	Conference record										Overall record					
	GP	W	L	T	OTW	OTL	SW	PTS	GF	GA	GP	W	L	T	GF	GA
Bemidji State †	24	15	7	2	2	1	2	48	82	64	38	20	16	2	117	111
St. Thomas	24	12	11	1	0	2	0	39	68	62	37	15	20	2	97	105
#19 Michigan Tech*	24	12	10	2	1	2	0	39	63	54	40	19	15	6	109	102
Minnesota State	24	12	10	2	2	1	1	38	73	62	37	18	15	4	111	96
Northern Michigan	24	10	10	4	1	1	2	36	57	67	34	12	16	6	83	105
Bowling Green	24	11	12	1	1	1	1	35	60	69	36	13	22	1	86	116
Lake Superior State	24	11	12	1	2	2	0	34	79	73	38	17	20	1	114	113
Ferris State	24	6	17	1	3	2	1	19	49	80	36	10	24	2	83	125
Augustana ^	0	0	0	0	0	0	0	0	0	0	34	12	18	4	90	105
Championship: March 22, 2024 † indicates conference regular season champion (MacNaughton Cup) * indicates conference tournament champion (Mason Cup)^ Augustana is playing a transition schedule of 16 games against conference opponents that are not counted in the standings Rankings: USCHO.com Top 20 Poll

== Schedule and results ==
Date	Time	Opponent^{#}	Rank^{#}	Site	TV	Decision	Result	Attendance	Record
Regular Season
October 7	7:05 pm	at Robert Morris*		Clearview Arena • Neville Township, Pennsylvania	FloHockey	Stoever	W 3–0	1,225	1–0–0
October 8	5:07 pm	Robert Morris*		Slater Family Ice Arena • Bowling Green, Ohio	FloHockey	Stoever	L 0–3	1,345	1–1–0
October 14	7:07 pm	at Augustana*		Denny Sanford Premier Center • Sioux Falls, South Dakota	FloHockey	Stoever	L 2–3	3,664	1–2–0
October 15	6:07 pm	at Augustana*		Denny Sanford Premier Center • Sioux Falls, South Dakota	FloHockey	Moore	L 1–4	2,891	1–3–0
October 20	7:07 pm	#9 Western Michigan*		Slater Family Ice Arena • Bowling Green, Ohio	FloHockey	Moore	L 2–5	4,862	1–4–0
October 21	6:00 pm	at #9 Western Michigan*		Lawson Arena • Kalamazoo, Michigan		Moore	L 2–5	2,760	1–5–0
November 3	7:07 pm	Mercyhurst*		Slater Family Ice Arena • Bowling Green, Ohio	FloHockey	Stoever	L 3–4 ^{OT}	2,814	1–6–0
November 3	7:07 pm	Mercyhurst*		Slater Family Ice Arena • Bowling Green, Ohio	FloHockey	Moore	W 4–2	3,065	2–6–0
November 10	7:07 pm	St. Thomas		Slater Family Ice Arena • Bowling Green, Ohio	FloHockey	Stoever	L 1–4	2,172	2–7–0 (0–1–0)
November 11	7:07 pm	St. Thomas		Slater Family Ice Arena • Bowling Green, Ohio	FloHockey	Stoever	L 3–4	2,180	2–8–0 (0–2–0)
November 17	7:07 pm	at Lake Superior State		Taffy Abel Arena • Sault Ste. Marie, Michigan	FloHockey	Moore	W 5–3	831	3–8–0 (1–2–0)
November 18	7:07 pm	at Lake Superior State		Taffy Abel Arena • Sault Ste. Marie, Michigan	FloHockey	Moore	L 3–4 ^{OT}	1,059	3–9–0 (1–3–0)
November 24	7:07 pm	Northern Michigan		Slater Family Ice Arena • Bowling Green, Ohio	FloHockey	Moore	W 6–2	2,610	4–9–0 (2–3–0)
November 25	7:07 pm	Northern Michigan		Slater Family Ice Arena • Bowling Green, Ohio	FloHockey	Moore	L 0–2	1,340	4–10–0 (2–4–0)
December 1	7:07 pm	at Michigan Tech		MacInnes Student Ice Arena • Houghton, Michigan	FloHockey	Moore	W 2–1 ^{OT}	2,974	5–10–0 (3–4–0)
December 2	6:07 pm	at Michigan Tech		MacInnes Student Ice Arena • Houghton, Michigan	FloHockey	Moore	L 2–3	2,759	5–11–0 (3–5–0)
December 8	7:07 pm	Ferris State		Slater Family Ice Arena • Bowling Green, Ohio	FloHockey	Moore	W 1–0	1,836	6–11–0 (4–5–0)
December 9	7:07 pm	Ferris State		Slater Family Ice Arena • Bowling Green, Ohio	FloHockey	Moore	W 4–3	1,816	7–11–0 (5–5–0)
December 14	8:07 pm	at Bemidji State		Sanford Center • Bemidji, Minnesota	FloHockey	Moore	L 1–3	1,019	7–12–0 (5–6–0)
December 15	8:07 pm	at Bemidji State		Sanford Center • Bemidji, Minnesota	FloHockey	Moore	L 2–5	1,539	7–13–0 (5–7–0)
December 30	6:00 pm	Windsor*		Slater Family Ice Arena • Bowling Green, Ohio (Exhibition)	FloHockey	Stoever	L 1–5	1,210	
January 5	7:00 pm	at Ohio State*		Value City Arena • Columbus, Ohio		Moore	L 2–6	5,050	7–14–0
January 6	7:07 pm	Ohio State*		Slater Family Ice Arena • Bowling Green, Ohio	FloHockey	Stoever	L 2–4	5,000	7–15–0
January 19	7:07 pm	Minnesota State		Slater Family Ice Arena • Bowling Green, Ohio	FloHockey	Moore	W 4–3	2,313	8–15–0 (6–7–0)
January 20	7:07 pm	Minnesota State		Slater Family Ice Arena • Bowling Green, Ohio	FloHockey	Stoever	L 1–4	2,812	8–16–0 (6–8–0)
February 2	7:07 pm	at Ferris State		Ewigleben Arena • Big Rapids, Michigan	FloHockey	Stoever	W 4–3	1,901	9–16–0 (7–8–0)
February 3	6:07 pm	at Ferris State		Ewigleben Arena • Big Rapids, Michigan	FloHockey	Moore	W 3–1	2,275	10–16–0 (8–8–0)
February 9	7:07 pm	Lake Superior State		Slater Family Ice Arena • Bowling Green, Ohio	FloHockey	Stoever	W 6–3	2,202	11–16–0 (9–8–0)
February 10	7:07 pm	Lake Superior State		Slater Family Ice Arena • Bowling Green, Ohio	FloHockey	Moore	W 4–2	3,012	12–16–0 (10–8–0)
February 16	8:07 pm	at St. Thomas		St. Thomas Ice Arena • Mendota Heights, Minnesota	FloHockey	Moore	T 3–3 ^{SOW}	894	12–16–1 (10–8–1)
February 17	7:07 pm	at St. Thomas		St. Thomas Ice Arena • Mendota Heights, Minnesota	FloHockey	Moore	W 3–1	796	13–16–1 (11–8–1)
February 23	7:07 pm	Michigan Tech		Slater Family Ice Arena • Bowling Green, Ohio	FloHockey	Moore	L 0–7	2,664	13–17–1 (11–9–1)
February 24	7:07 pm	Michigan Tech		Slater Family Ice Arena • Bowling Green, Ohio	FloHockey	Moore	L 1–3	4,184	13–18–1 (11–10–1)
March 1	7:07 pm	at Northern Michigan		Berry Events Center • Marquette, Michigan	FloHockey	Moore	L 1–4	2,565	13–19–1 (11–11–1)
March 2	7:07 pm	at Northern Michigan		Berry Events Center • Marquette, Michigan	FloHockey	Stoever	L 0–1	3,007	13–20–1 (11–12–1)
CCHA Tournament
March 8	7:07 pm	at Michigan Tech*		MacInnes Student Ice Arena • Houghton, Michigan (Quarterfinal Game 1)	FloHockey	Moore	L 0–5	2,718	13–21–1
March 9	6:07 pm	at Michigan Tech*		MacInnes Student Ice Arena • Houghton, Michigan (Quarterfinal Game 2)	FloHockey	Stoever	L 5–6	2,889	13–22–1
*Non-conference game. ^{#}Rankings from USCHO.com Poll. All times are in Eastern Time. Source:

== Scoring statistics ==
Name	Position	Games	Goals	Assists	Points	PIM
Ryan O'Hara	LW	26	10	8	18	12
Spencer Kersten	RW	36	9	7	16	8
Brett Pfoh	F	34	9	6	15	28
Brody Waters	LW	34	6	9	15	25
Josh Nodler	C/RW	36	5	10	15	28
Jaden Grant	F	36	3	11	14	14
Seth Fyten	F	26	7	6	13	37
Ethan Scardina	C	26	6	6	12	22
Quinn Emerson	C/RW	36	5	6	11	10
Gustav Stjernberg	D	31	4	7	11	40
Brandon Santa Juana	F	36	2	9	11	16
Dalton Norris	D	23	5	5	10	19
Ben Doran	F	25	3	7	10	28
Owen Ozar	F	36	5	4	9	40
Ben Wozney	D	22	2	7	9	16
Eric Parker	D	33	1	8	9	29
Michael Bevilacqua	D	20	2	5	7	2
Tommy Pasanen	D	29	1	6	7	20
Breck McKinley	D	31	0	6	6	6
Brayden Krieger	F	26	0	5	5	0
Adam Schankula	F	14	1	2	3	0
Christian Stoever	G	14	0	1	1	2
Nick O'Hanisain	D	20	0	1	1	9
Jack Blake	F	23	0	1	1	4
Pete Eigner	G	2	0	0	0	0
Salvatore Evola	F	3	0	0	0	0
Spencer Schneider	F	12	0	0	0	0
Cole Moore	G	25	0	0	0	0
Total			86	142	228	395

== Goaltending statistics ==
Name	Games	Minutes	Wins	Losses	Ties	Goals Against	Saves	Shut Outs	SV %	GAA
Cole Moore	28	1378:19	10	13	1	66	734	1	.918	2.87
Christian Stoever	17	755:33	3	9	0	41	327	1	.889	3.26
Salvatore Evola	4	18:06	0	0	0	1	7	0	.875	3.31
Empty Net	-	18:32	-	-	-	8	-	-	-	-
Total	36	2170:30	13	22	1	116	1068	2	.902	3.21

== Rankings ==
Poll	Week																										
Poll	Pre	1	2	3	4	5	6	7	8	9	10	11	12	13	14	15	16	17	18	19	20	21	22	23	24	25	26 (Final)
USCHO.com	NR	NR	NR	NR	NR	NR	NR	NR	NR	NR	NR	–	NR	NR	NR	NR	NR	NR	NR	NR	NR	NR	NR	NR	NR	–	NR
USA Hockey	NR	NR	NR	NR	NR	NR	NR	NR	NR	NR	NR	NR	–	NR	NR	NR	NR	NR	NR	NR	NR	NR	NR	NR	NR	NR	NR

Note: USCHO did not release a poll in weeks 11 and 25.
Note: USA Hockey did not release a poll in week 12.

== Awards and honors ==
Player	Award	Ref
Cole Moore	CCHA Rookie Team	
