= 2022–23 St. Thomas (Minnesota) Tommies men's ice hockey season =

2022–23 St. Thomas Tommies men's ice hockey season
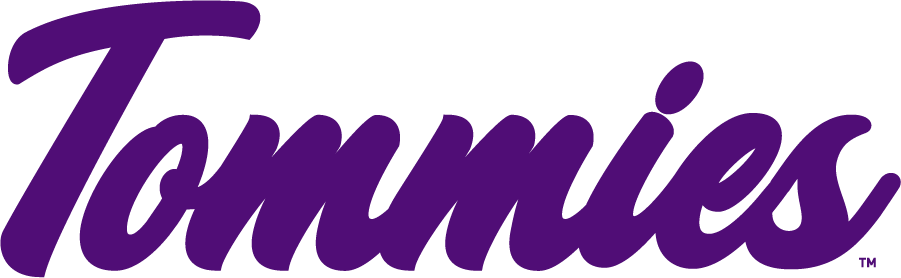
- Conference: 7th CCHA
- Home ice: St. Thomas Ice Arena

Rankings
- USCHO: NR
- USA Today: NR

Record
- Overall: 11–23–2
- Conference: 10–14–2
- Home: 7–9–1
- Road: 4–14–1

Coaches and captains
- Head coach: Enrico Blasi
- Assistant coaches: Leon Hayward; Cory Laylin

The 2022–23 St. Thomas Tommies men's ice hockey season was the 99th season of play for the program, the 2nd in Division I and the 2nd in the CCHA conference. The Tommies represented the University of St. Thomas (Minnesota) and were coached by Enrico Blasi, in his second season.

== Season ==
After a predictably terrible season, the first for the program at the Division I level, coach Blasi continued his task of turning the Tommies into a competitive team. With more than half of the team being new, there were sure to be changes but the roster turnover meant that getting the team to gel together would take time. The offense, which had been one of the worst in the nation in 2022, did not see much improvement early in the season. In the first 14 games, the Tommies scored more than two goals in just four matches. Averaging just over two goals per game, the team got off to an ugly start (2–12). While their record was awful, the team did show improvement on the defensive end. St. Thomas was allowing far fewer shots and goals against and half of their losses were by only one goal.

Just after Thanksgiving, the Tommies posted their first weekend sweep at the D-I level. Using the milestone as a benchmark, St. Thomas saw a vast improvement to their performance over the remainder of the season. A modest increase in both offensive production and defensive efficiency enabled the team to post a .500 record over their final 18 games. While the Tommies could not string together anything resembling a winning streak, they also never lost more than two in a row during that stretch. St. Thomas was also able to post its first two wins over ranked teams, defeating both Michigan Tech and Minnesota State on the road. Though they could not improve on their conference position much due to the team's poor start, the wins piled up to the point where the Tommies had a respectable total by the end of the year.

St. Thomas finished the season as the 7th seed in the CCHA tournament and, though they weren't predicted to win, they still outperformed expectations. The Tommies pushed Tech to the limit in both games, ultimately falling short by a single goal in both.

While the team did finish the season 12 games under .500, the program had come a long way over the course of the season. Not only did they nearly quadruple the win total from 2022, but they increased their goal production by 27 while cutting down on the goals allowed by 51. Even with a losing record, the program could still chalk this season up as a success.

== Departures ==
Player	Position	Nationality	Cause
Jacob Berger	Goaltender	United States	Graduation (retired)
Michael Ferrandino	Defenseman	United States	Transferred to Augsburg
Kyler Grundy	Forward	United States	Transferred to UW-Eau Claire
Kimball Johnson	Defenseman	United States	Transferred to Utica
Justin Kelley	Forward	United States	Transferred to Bethel
Grant Loven	Forward	United States	Graduate transfer to Canisius
Lucas McGregor	Forward	United States	Left program (retired)
Shayne Monahan	Defenseman	United States	Graduation (retired)
Logan Ommen	Forward	United States	Left program (retired)
Sam Renlund	Forward	United States	Left program (retired)
Paul Schmid	Forward	Austria	Transferred to Norwich
John Schuldt	Defenseman	United States	Graduation (retired)
Joe Sofo	Forward	United States	Graduation (signed with Pensacola Ice Flyers)
Aaron Swanson	Forward	United States	Transferred to UW-Eau Claire
Peter Thome	Goaltender	United States	Graduation (signed with Idaho Steelheads)
Christiano Versich	Forward	United States	Graduation (signed with Jokers de Cergy-Pontoise)
Vincent Weis	Defenseman	United States	Transferred to Augsburg

== Recruiting ==
Player	Position	Nationality	Age	Notes
Jake Braccini	Forward	United States	21	Hanover, MN
Mack Byers	Forward	United States	23	Long Lake, MN; transfer from Northern Michigan
Garrett Daly	Forward	United States	23	Lakeville, MN; transfer from Bowling Green
Grant Docter	Defenseman	United States	21	Golden Valley, MN; transfer from Michigan Tech
Josh Eernisse	Forward	United States	20	Apple Valley, MN
Cooper Gay	Forward	United States	20	Edina, MN
Luke Kron	Forward	United States	20	Andover, MN
Luc Laylin	Forward	United States	20	St. Michael, MN
Jarrett Lee	Forward	United States	23	Hibbing, MN; graduate transfer from Minnesota Duluth
Ryan O'Neill	Forward	United States	21	Roseville, MN
Quinton Pepper	Forward	Canada	20	London, ON
Carson Peters	Defenseman	United States	19	Minneapolis, MN
Ethan Roberts	Goaltender	United States	20	Cary, NC
Braidan Simmons-Fischer	Defenseman	United States	20	Detroit, MI
Aaron Trotter	Goaltender	Canada	21	Victoria, BC
Lucas Wahlin	Forward	United States	21	Woodbury, MN

== Roster ==
As of July 21, 2022.

No.	Nat.	Player	Class	Pos	Height	Weight	DoB	Hometown	Previous team	NHL rights
2	(United States)	Trevor Zins	Senior	D	6' 1" (1.85 m)	195 lb (88 kg)	1998-07-23	St. Michael, Minnesota	St. Cloud State (NCHC)	—
3	(United States)	Lucas Wahlin	Freshman	F	5' 11" (1.8 m)	160 lb (73 kg)	2001-05-03	Woodbury, Minnesota	Lincoln Stars (USHL)	—
4	(United States)	Nolan Sawchuk	Graduate	D	5' 11" (1.8 m)	185 lb (84 kg)	1997-09-25	Burnsville, Minnesota	Massachusetts Lowell (HEA)	—
5	(United States)	Garrett Daly	Graduate	D	6' 0" (1.83 m)	195 lb (88 kg)	1999-08-11	Lakeville, Minnesota	Bowling Green (CCHA)	—
6	(United States)	Josh Eernisse	Freshman	F	6' 2" (1.88 m)	205 lb (93 kg)	2001-12-31	Apple Valley, Minnesota	Tri-City Storm (USHL)	—
7	(United States)	Luke Kron	Freshman	F	6' 0" (1.83 m)	175 lb (79 kg)	2002-05-24	Andover, Minnesota	Sioux Falls Stampede (USHL)	—
8	(United States)	Cameron Recchi	Sophomore	F	5' 10" (1.78 m)	165 lb (75 kg)	2001-05-24	Pittsburgh, Pennsylvania	Salmon Arm Silverbacks (BCHL)	—
9	(United States)	Matthew Jennings	Graduate	F	5' 8" (1.73 m)	173 lb (78 kg)	1997-06-07	Buford, Georgia	Ohio State (Big Ten)	—
10	(United States)	Andrew Kangas	Senior	F	5' 9" (1.75 m)	185 lb (84 kg)	1998-01-28	Mahtomedi, Minnesota	Minot Minotauros (NAHL)	—
11	(United States)	Ryan O'Neill	Freshman	F	5' 10" (1.78 m)	175 lb (79 kg)	2001-02-25	Roseville, Minnesota	St. Cloud Norsemen (NAHL)	—
12	(United States)	Tim Piechowski	Sophomore	F	6' 2" (1.88 m)	210 lb (95 kg)	2000-12-08	Eden Prairie, Minnesota	Bismarck Bobcats (NAHL)	—
15	(Canada)	Quinton Pepper	Freshman	F	6' 3" (1.91 m)	187 lb (85 kg)	2002-01-31	London, Ontario	Steinbach Pistons (MJHL)	—
16	(United States)	Luke Manning	Senior	F	5' 10" (1.78 m)	190 lb (86 kg)	1999-04-13	Stillwater, Minnesota	Air Force (AHA)	—
17	(United States)	Jake Braccini	Freshman	F	5' 11" (1.8 m)	192 lb (87 kg)	2001-07-02	Hanover, Minnesota	Muskegon Lumberjacks (USHL)	—
18	(United States)	Ethan Gauer	Junior	D	6' 0" (1.83 m)	185 lb (84 kg)	1999-12-23	Farmington, Minnesota	Bemidji State (WCHA)	—
19	(United States)	Luc Laylin	Freshman	F	5' 8" (1.73 m)	170 lb (77 kg)	2001-12-30	St. Michael, Minnesota	Prince George Spruce Kings (BCHL)	—
20	(United States)	Cooper Gay	Freshman	F	6' 4" (1.93 m)	210 lb (95 kg)	2002-03-15	Edina, Minnesota	Fargo Force (USHL)	—
21	(United States)	Carson Peters	Freshman	D	6' 3" (1.91 m)	200 lb (91 kg)	2002-10-28	Medina, Minnesota	Cedar Rapids RoughRiders (USHL)	—
22	(United States)	Mack Byers	Junior	F	6' 1" (1.85 m)	190 lb (86 kg)	1999-02-08	Long Lake, Minnesota	Northern Michigan (CCHA)	—
24	(United States)	Grant Docter	Sophomore	D	5' 10" (1.78 m)	174 lb (79 kg)	2000-12-06	Golden Valley, Minnesota	Michigan Tech (CCHA)	—
25	(Canada)	Trevor LeDonne	Sophomore	D	6' 1" (1.85 m)	195 lb (88 kg)	2000-02-27	Stoney Creek, Ontario	Nanaimo Clippers (BCHL)	—
26	(United States)	Blaine Warnert	Sophomore	F	6' 5" (1.96 m)	190 lb (86 kg)	2000-07-17	Chaska, Minnesota	Minot Minotauros (NAHL)	—
27	(United States)	Luke Perunovich	Graduate	D	6' 1" (1.85 m)	185 lb (84 kg)	1997-05-12	Edina, Minnesota	Providence (HEA)	—
28	(United States)	Braidan Simmons-Fischer	Freshman	D	6' 7" (2.01 m)	220 lb (100 kg)	2002-01-26	Detroit, Michigan	Austin Bruins (NAHL)	—
29	(United States)	Jarrett Lee	Graduate	F	5' 10" (1.78 m)	154 lb (70 kg)	1999-06-04	Hibbing, Minnesota	Minnesota Duluth (NCHC)	—
31	(Canada)	Aaron Trotter	Freshman	G	6' 2" (1.88 m)	170 lb (77 kg)	2001-04-07	Victoria, British Columbia	Prince George (BCHL)	—
35	(United States)	Henry Baribeau	Senior	G	6' 3" (1.91 m)	190 lb (86 kg)	1998-10-15	Hudson, Wisconsin	New Ulm Steel (NA3HL)	—
42	(United States)	Ethan Roberts	Freshman	G	6' 1" (1.85 m)	172 lb (78 kg)	2002-09-24	Cary, North Carolina	Springfield Jr. Blues (NAHL)	—

== Standings ==
2022–23 Central Collegiate Hockey Association Standings
	Conference record										Overall record					
	GP	W	L	T	OTW	OTL	SW	PTS	GF	GA	GP	W	L	T	GF	GA
#12 Minnesota State †*	26	16	9	1	2	4	1	52	83	56	39	25	13	1	126	81
#13 Michigan Tech	26	15	7	4	0	1	0	50	68	54	39	24	11	4	103	88
Bowling Green	26	12	12	2	0	2	1	41	89	76	36	15	19	2	114	114
Northern Michigan	26	14	12	0	3	0	0	39	82	77	38	21	17	0	123	103
Bemidji State	26	12	11	3	3	1	2	39	73	63	36	14	17	5	94	97
Ferris State	26	9	14	3	1	2	3	34	62	91	37	14	19	4	92	131
St. Thomas	26	10	14	2	1	1	0	32	69	81	36	11	23	2	86	117
Lake Superior State	26	8	17	1	2	1	1	25	52	80	36	9	25	2	71	118
Championship: March 18, 2023 † indicates conference regular season champion (MacNaughton Cup) * indicates conference tournament champion (Mason Cup); Rankings: USCHO.com Top 20 Poll

== Schedule and results ==
Date	Time	Opponent^{#}	Rank^{#}	Site	TV	Decision	Result	Attendance	Record
Regular Season
October 1	6:00 PM	#13 St. Cloud State*		St. Thomas Ice Arena • Mendota Heights, Minnesota	FloHockey	Trotter	L 1–3	975	0–1–0
October 2	4:00 PM	at #13 St. Cloud State*		Herb Brooks National Hockey Center • St. Cloud, Minnesota	FOX 9+	Roberts	L 0–4	3,284	0–2–0
October 7	7:07 PM	Alaska*		St. Thomas Ice Arena • Mendota Heights, Minnesota	FloHockey	Trotter	L 2–4	821	0–3–0
October 8	6:07 PM	Alaska*		St. Thomas Ice Arena • Mendota Heights, Minnesota	FloHockey	Trotter	W 3–2 ^{OT}	738	1–3–0
October 14	7:07 PM	USNTDP*		St. Thomas Ice Arena • Mendota Heights, Minnesota (Exhibition)	FloHockey	Trotter	L 2–5		
October 21	6:00 PM	at #18 Penn State*		Pegula Ice Arena • University Park, Pennsylvania		Trotter	L 2–6	6,034	1–4–0
October 22	6:00 PM	at #18 Penn State*		Pegula Ice Arena • University Park, Pennsylvania		Trotter	L 2–3 ^{OT}	6,243	1–5–0
October 28	6:07 PM	at Ferris State		Ewigleben Arena • Big Rapids, Michigan	FloHockey	Trotter	L 2–3 ^{OT}	1,847	1–6–0 (0–1–0)
October 29	5:07 PM	at Ferris State		Ewigleben Arena • Big Rapids, Michigan	FloHockey	Trotter	W 5–2	1,823	2–6–0 (1–1–0)
November 4	7:07 PM	#6 Minnesota State		St. Thomas Ice Arena • Mendota Heights, Minnesota	FloHockey	Trotter	L 2–10	961	2–7–0 (1–2–0)
November 5	6:07 PM	at #6 Minnesota State		Mayo Clinic Health System Event Center • Mankato, Minnesota	KEYC	Roberts	L 3–4	5,094	2–8–0 (1–3–0)
November 11	6:07 PM	at Bowling Green		Slater Family Ice Arena • Bowling Green, Ohio	FloHockey	Trotter	L 2–3	2,204	2–9–0 (1–4–0)
November 12	6:07 PM	at Bowling Green		Slater Family Ice Arena • Bowling Green, Ohio	FloHockey	Trotter	L 2–3	2,467	2–10–0 (1–5–0)
November 18	7:07 PM	Michigan Tech		St. Thomas Ice Arena • Mendota Heights, Minnesota	FloHockey	Trotter	L 2–6	816	2–11–0 (1–6–0)
November 19	6:07 PM	Michigan Tech		St. Thomas Ice Arena • Mendota Heights, Minnesota	FloHockey	Trotter	L 3–4	815	2–12–0 (1–7–0)
November 25	7:07 PM	Lake Superior State		St. Thomas Ice Arena • Mendota Heights, Minnesota	FloHockey	Trotter	W 4–0	646	3–12–0 (2–7–0)
November 26	6:07 PM	Lake Superior State		St. Thomas Ice Arena • Mendota Heights, Minnesota	FloHockey	Trotter	W 2–1	568	4–12–0 (3–7–0)
December 2	7:07 PM	at Bemidji State		Sanford Center • Bemidji, Minnesota	FloHockey	Trotter	L 4–6	2,064	4–13–0 (3–8–0)
December 3	6:07 PM	at Bemidji State		Sanford Center • Bemidji, Minnesota	FloHockey	Trotter	T 2–2 ^{SOL}	1,617	4–13–1 (3–8–1)
December 16	7:07 PM	Ferris State		St. Thomas Ice Arena • Mendota Heights, Minnesota	FloHockey	Trotter	W 7–4	615	5–13–1 (4–8–1)
December 17	6:07 PM	Ferris State		St. Thomas Ice Arena • Mendota Heights, Minnesota	FloHockey	Trotter	L 2–4	645	5–14–1 (4–9–1)
December 31	2:00 PM	at Minnesota Duluth*		AMSOIL Arena • Duluth, Minnesota (Exhibition)	MY9	Trotter	L 1–2	5,746	
January 13	6:07 PM	at #13 Michigan Tech		MacInnes Student Ice Arena • Houghton, Michigan	FloHockey	Trotter	L 0–2	2,873	5–15–1 (4–10–1)
January 14	5:07 PM	at #13 Michigan Tech		MacInnes Student Ice Arena • Houghton, Michigan	FloHockey	Trotter	W 3–2	3,324	6–15–1 (5–10–1)
January 19	7:07 PM	Bowling Green		St. Thomas Ice Arena • Mendota Heights, Minnesota	FloHockey	Trotter	W 4–2	490	7–15–1 (6–10–1)
January 20	7:07 PM	Bowling Green		St. Thomas Ice Arena • Mendota Heights, Minnesota	FloHockey	Trotter	T 3–3 ^{SOL}	739	7–15–2 (6–10–2)
January 27	8:00 PM	at Arizona State*		Mullett Arena • Tempe, Arizona		Trotter	L 0–4	4,336	7–16–2
January 28	8:00 PM	at Arizona State*		Mullett Arena • Tempe, Arizona		Trotter	L 3–4 ^{OT}	4,464	7–17–2
February 3	7:07 PM	at #13 Minnesota State		Mayo Clinic Health System Event Center • Mankato, Minnesota	KEYC	Trotter	W 3–2 ^{OT}	4,814	8–17–2 (7–10–2)
February 4	6:07 PM	#13 Minnesota State		St. Thomas Ice Arena • Mendota Heights, Minnesota	FloHockey	Trotter	L 2–5	1,080	8–18–2 (7–11–2)
February 10	7:07 PM	Northern Michigan		St. Thomas Ice Arena • Mendota Heights, Minnesota	FloHockey	Trotter	L 0–3	898	8–19–2 (7–12–2)
February 11	6:07 PM	Northern Michigan		St. Thomas Ice Arena • Mendota Heights, Minnesota	FloHockey	Trotter	W 4–2	870	9–19–2 (8–12–2)
February 17	6:07 PM	at Lake Superior State		Taffy Abel Arena • Sault Ste. Marie, Michigan	FloHockey	Trotter	L 1–2	1,150	9–20–2 (8–13–2)
February 18	5:07 PM	at Lake Superior State		Taffy Abel Arena • Sault Ste. Marie, Michigan	FloHockey	Trotter	W 2–1	1,763	10–20–2 (9–13–2)
February 24	7:07 PM	at Bemidji State		St. Thomas Ice Arena • Mendota Heights, Minnesota	FloHockey	Trotter	W 3–1	775	11–20–2 (10–13–2)
February 25	6:07 PM	at Bemidji State		St. Thomas Ice Arena • Mendota Heights, Minnesota	FloHockey	Trotter	L 2–7	924	11–21–2 (10–14–2)
CCHA Tournament
March 3	6:07 PM	at #11 Michigan Tech*		MacInnes Student Ice Arena • Houghton, Michigan (Quarterfinal Game 1)	FloHockey	Trotter	L 0–1	2,338	11–22–2
March 4	5:07 PM	at #11 Michigan Tech*		MacInnes Student Ice Arena • Houghton, Michigan (Quarterfinal Game 2)	FloHockey	Trotter	L 4–5	2,587	11–23–2
*Non-conference game. ^{#}Rankings from USCHO.com Poll. All times are in Central Time. Source:

== Scoring statistics ==
Name	Position	Games	Goals	Assists	Points	PIM
Mack Byers	LW	36	18	8	26	6
Josh Eernisse	F	36	14	7	21	54
Luc Laylin	F	36	10	11	21	29
Lucas Wahlin	F	26	6	15	21	20
Ryan O'Neill	F	36	3	17	20	8
Jake Braccini	RW	32	6	11	17	9
Luke Manning	C	35	8	5	13	10
Cameron Recchi	C/LW	35	2	10	12	25
Jarrett Lee	F	34	1	10	11	18
Trevor Zins	D	34	1	7	8	10
Cooper Gay	RW	30	4	3	7	13
Tim Piechowski	RW	30	3	3	6	12
Ethan Gauer	D	35	3	3	6	8
Grant Docter	D	25	1	4	5	26
Carson Peters	D	36	1	4	5	18
Trevor LeDonne	D	21	0	5	5	10
Matthew Jennings	C	26	2	2	4	8
Quinton Pepper	RW	34	0	4	4	6
Nolan Sawchuk	D	28	1	2	3	6
Andrew Kangas	F	11	1	1	2	6
Aaron Trotter	G	34	0	2	2	4
Garrett Daly	D	26	0	2	2	37
Braidan Simmons-Fischer	D	19	1	0	1	28
Ethan Roberts	G	5	0	1	1	0
Luke Perunovich	D	14	0	1	1	15
Henry Baribeau	G	1	0	0	0	0
Blaine Warnert	F	1	0	0	0	0
Luke Kron	C	2	0	0	0	8
Bench	-	-	-	-	-	2
Total			86	137	223	379

== Goaltending statistics ==
Name	Games	Minutes	Wins	Losses	Ties	Goals against	Saves	Shut outs	SV %	GAA
Henry Baribeau	1	2:03	0	0	0	0	1	0	1.000	0.00
Aaron Trotter	34	1988:07	11	21	2	99	943	1	.905	2.99
Ethan Roberts	7	172:10	0	2	0	13	86	0	.869	4.53
Empty Net	-	21:48	-	-	-	5	-	-	-	-
Total	36	2162:20	11	23	2	117	1030	1	.902	3.22

== Rankings ==
Poll	Week																											
Poll	Pre	1	2	3	4	5	6	7	8	9	10	11	12	13	14	15	16	17	18	19	20	21	22	23	24	25	26	27 (Final)
USCHO.com	NR	-	NR	NR	NR	NR	NR	NR	NR	NR	NR	NR	NR	-	NR	NR	NR	NR	NR	NR	NR	NR	NR	NR	NR	NR	-	NR
USA Today	NR	NR	NR	NR	NR	NR	NR	NR	NR	NR	NR	NR	NR	NR	NR	NR	NR	NR	NR	NR	NR	NR	NR	NR	NR	NR	NR	NR

Note: USCHO did not release a poll in weeks 1, 13, or 26.

== Players drafted into the NHL ==
=== 2023 NHL entry draft ===
Round	Pick	Player	NHL team
5	154	Chase Cheslock ^{†}	New Jersey Devils

† incoming freshman
