= 2022–23 Michigan Tech Huskies men's ice hockey season =

Desert Hockey Classic, Champion NCAA Tournament, Midwest Regional Semifinal
- Conference: 2nd CCHA
- Home ice: MacInnes Student Ice Arena

Rankings
- USCHO: #13
- USA Today: #13

Record
- Overall: 24–11–4
- Conference: 15–7–4
- Home: 12–4–1
- Road: 10–5–3
- Neutral: 2–2–0

Coaches and captains
- Head coach: Joe Shawhan
- Assistant coaches: Tyler Shelast; Jordy Murray; Jamie Phillips
- Captain(s): Arvid Caderoth; Brett Thorne
- Alternate captain(s): Ryland Mosley; Logan Pietila

The 2022–23 Michigan Tech Huskies men's ice hockey season was the 102nd season of play for the program and 5th in the CCHA. The Huskies represented Michigan Technological University in the 2022–23 NCAA Division I men's ice hockey season, were coached by Joe Shawhan in his 6th season and played their home games at MacInnes Student Ice Arena.

== Season ==
While the Huskies were coming off their best season in 6 years, the team lost a great deal of experience to graduation, including 5 of their top 6 scorers from 2022. As a result, expectations were low for Michigan Tech and the team was hovering around the bottoms of both preseason polls. The lack of offense was not too keenly felt as the Huskies were led by senior netminder, Blake Pietila and he turned in several stellar performances early. In October alone, Pietila earned three shutouts in non-conference play to stake Tech to a solid national ranking. By November some of the new players were being integrated into the lineup and Tech's offense began to improve. The biggest addition was the team's top prospect, Kyle Kukkonen, who led the Huskies' in goals for the year and was named the CCHA Rookie of the Year.

A significant series for the program in the first half was winning the weekend of last year's national runner-up, Minnesota State. The weekend victory over the Mavericks was followed up by four consecutive losses but as Tech entered the winter break they were back in the national rankings.

Michigan Tech began the second half of the season with one of their worst performances on the year, losing 1–8 to Western Michigan. After the embarrassing defeat, the team recovered swiftly and won their next three games, two coming against ranked clubs, and finished by winning the Desert Hockey Classic. Pietila continued his outstanding play and carried the team to a 7–3–1 record in the second half against conference teams. Entering the final weekend of the year, the Huskies and Mavericks had a showdown in Mankato for the regular season championship with Tech needing both games to win the title. Pietila, who had set a new program record for shutout in 2022 with 7, opened the final series with his 9th shoutout on the year to at least temporarily lift Tech up to #1 in the conference. Unfortunately, the Huskies got into penalty trouble in the rematch and allowed 3 power play goals, losing 2–3 and letting the conference championship slip through their fingers.

Despite finishing 2nd, Michigan Tech was ranked ahead of Minnesota State nationally and were all but guaranteed a spot in the NCAA tournament so long as they got out of the first round. Tech was set opposite St. Thomas who, though they had made strides, were still a long-shot to beat MTU. Despite the difference in record, the Tommies played hard and gave the Huskies all they could handle. Pietila withstood an 18-shot barrage in the third period to allow Michigan Tech to escape with a 1–0 victory. The rematch was a completely different game as it was the offense that was key. Tristan Ashbrook and Kyle Kukkonen each scored twice to give the team two 3-goal leads. St. Thomas would not go away, however, and Tech was fighting for its life in the third when the Tommies came within a goal of tying the score. Pietila held in the end for another 1-goal win and a near-certain appearance in the NCAA tournament. The team's comfortable position turned out to be very important as Tech lost the conference semifinal to long-time rival Northern Michigan 0–4.

Michigan Tech returned to the NCAA tournament and were given a favorable draw in Penn State. The Nittany Lions had stumbled in the second half of the season, posting a record of 4–10–1 since January 1. As the game began, however, it was apparent that Penn State had come to play. PSU opened the scoring just over 2 minutes into the game and, though they didn't score again in the first, dominated the pace of play. Penn State broke the game open in the third and added three more goal to their total. Tech fought back with 13 shots in the middle frame but could not get anything past Liam Soulière. The game became comical in the third and the Nittany Lions scored 4 more times while Tech looked like they just wanted the game to end. When the dust settled, Tech had lost 0–8, the worst shutout defeat in NCAA tournament history. The horrible end marred what had previously been a very successful year for the Huskies.

== Departures ==
Player	Position	Nationality	Cause
Cayden Bailey	Goaltender	United States	Left program (retired)
Trenton Bliss	Forward	United States	Graduation (signed with Grand Rapids Griffins)
Alec Broetzman	Forward	United States	Graduation (signed with Iowa Heartlanders)
Tyrell Buckley	Defenseman	Canada	Graduate transfer to Canisius
Brenden Datema	Defenseman	United States	Transferred to Canisius
Grant Docter	Defenseman	United States	Transferred to St. Thomas
Eric Gotz	Defenseman	United States	Graduate transfer to Vermont
Brian Halonen	Forward	United States	Graduation (signed with New Jersey Devils)
Michael Karow	Defenseman	United States	Graduation (signed with Texas Stars)
Justin Misiak	Forward	United States	Graduation (signed with Idaho Steelheads)
Tommy Parrottino	Forward	United States	Graduation (signed with Idaho Steelheads)
Matthew Quercia	Forward	United States	Graduation (signed with Wheeling Nailers)
Mark Sinclair	Goaltender	Canada	Graduation (signed with Cincinnati Cyclones)
Colin Swoyer	Defenseman	United States	Graduation (signed with Pittsburgh Penguins)

== Recruiting ==
Player	Position	Nationality	Age	Notes
Oliver Bezick	Defenseman	United States	21	Delray Beach, FL
Frank Dovorany	Defenseman	United States	21	Wausau, WI
Topi Heiskanen	Defenseman	Finland	20	Kuopio, FIN
David Jankowski	Forward	Canada	25	Dundas, ON; graduate transfer from St. Lawrence
Kyle Kukkonen	Forward	United States	19	Maple Grove, MN; selected 162nd overall in 2021
Trevor Kukkonen	Forward	United States	21	Maple Grove, MN
Michael Morelli	Goaltender	United States	21	Arvada, CO
Ryan O'Connell	Defenseman	Canada	23	Gloucester, ON; graduate transfer from Ohio State; selected 203rd overall in 2017
Evan Orr	Defenseman	United States	21	Shelby Township, MI
Kash Rasmussen	Forward	Canada	21	Cochrane, AB
Kasper Vähärautio	Defenseman	Finland	19	Helsinki, FIN
Max Väyrynen	Goaltender	Finland	20	Espoo, FIN

== Roster ==
As of August 26, 2022.

No.	Nat.	Player	Class	Pos	Height	Weight	DoB	Hometown	Previous team	NHL rights
2	(Finland)	Topi Heiskanen	Freshman	D	5' 11" (1.8 m)	185 lb (84 kg)	2002-07-02	Kuopio, Finland	KalPa U20 (U20 SM-sarja)	—
3	(Canada)	Ryan O'Connell	Graduate	D	6' 1" (1.85 m)	185 lb (84 kg)	1999-04-25	Manotick, Ontario	Ohio State (Big Ten)	TOR, 203rd overall 2017
4	(United States)	Chris Lipe	Senior	D	6' 1" (1.85 m)	195 lb (88 kg)	1999-11-23	Rockford, Michigan	Dubuque (USHL)	—
5	(Australia)	Tyrone Bronte	Junior	F	5' 10" (1.78 m)	175 lb (79 kg)	1999-05-07	Melbourne, Australia	Alabama–Huntsville (WCHA)	—
6	(United States)	Levi Stauber	Sophomore	F	5' 11" (1.8 m)	175 lb (79 kg)	2000-01-16	Hermantown, Minnesota	Danbury (NAHL)	—
7	(United States)	Nick Nardella	Junior	F	5' 10" (1.78 m)	173 lb (78 kg)	1999-02-09	Rosemont, Illinois	Janesville (NAHL)	—
8	(United States)	Trevor Russell	Sophomore	D	6' 2" (1.88 m)	197 lb (89 kg)	2000-02-02	Old Hickory, Tennessee	Aberdeen (NAHL)	—
9	(United States)	Kyle Kukkonen	Freshman	F	5' 10" (1.78 m)	172 lb (78 kg)	2002-11-13	Maple Grove, Minnesota	Madison (USHL)	ANA, 162nd overall 2021
10	(United States)	Jake Crespi	Senior	F	6' 0" (1.83 m)	190 lb (86 kg)	1998-12-10	Brighton, Michigan	Tri-City (USHL)	—
11	(Canada)	Ryland Mosley (A)	Junior	F	5' 11" (1.8 m)	185 lb (84 kg)	2000-02-15	Arnprior, Ontario	Carleton Place (CCHL)	—
12	(United States)	Frank Dovorany	Freshman	D	6' 0" (1.83 m)	185 lb (84 kg)	2001-03-28	Wausau, Wisconsin	Odessa (NAHL)	—
13	(United States)	Logan Pietila (A)	Senior	F	5' 11" (1.8 m)	175 lb (79 kg)	2000-01-27	Howell, Michigan	Dubuque (USHL)	—
14	(Canada)	Logan Ganie	Senior	F	5' 11" (1.8 m)	185 lb (84 kg)	1999-06-28	Irma, Alberta	Spruce Grove (AJHL)	—
15	(Canada)	Parker Saretsky	Senior	F	6' 0" (1.83 m)	185 lb (84 kg)	1999-04-23	Wainwright, Alberta	Spruce Grove (AJHL)	—
16	(Canada)	Kash Rasmussen	Freshman	F	6' 2" (1.88 m)	170 lb (77 kg)	2001-04-20	Cochrane, Alberta	Bonnyville (AJHL)	—
17	(Canada)	David Jankowski	Senior	F	6' 1" (1.85 m)	174 lb (79 kg)	1997-05-25	Dundas, Ontario	St. Lawrence (ECAC)	—
18	(United States)	Alex Nordstrom	Sophomore	F	5' 11" (1.8 m)	165 lb (75 kg)	2000-11-15	Atlantic Mine, Michigan	Green Bay (USHL)	—
19	(Finland)	Kasper Vähärautio	Freshman	D	6' 0" (1.83 m)	187 lb (85 kg)	2002-10-02	Helsinki, Finland	Jokerit U20 (U20 SM-sarja)	—
20	(Sweden)	Arvid Caderoth (C)	Junior	F	6' 5" (1.96 m)	220 lb (100 kg)	2000-05-14	Gothenburg, Sweden	Frölunda J20 (J20 SuperElit)	—
21	(United States)	Blais Richartz	Junior	F	6' 0" (1.83 m)	185 lb (84 kg)	2000-06-23	Menomonie, Wisconsin	Lincoln (USHL)	—
22	(Sweden)	Marcus Pedersen	Sophomore	F	6' 3" (1.91 m)	187 lb (85 kg)	2001-05-25	Stockholm, Sweden	Malmö Redhawks J20 (J20 Nationell)	—
23	(United States)	Trevor Kukkonen	Freshman	F	5' 11" (1.8 m)	181 lb (82 kg)	2001-02-01	Maple Grove, Minnesota	Minnesota Magicians (NAHL)	—
24	(United States)	Oliver Bezick	Freshman	D	6' 0" (1.83 m)	190 lb (86 kg)	2001-06-12	Delray Beach, Florida	Amarillo (NAHL)	—
25	(United States)	Jed Pietila	Junior	D	5' 11" (1.8 m)	185 lb (84 kg)	1999-01-13	Howell, Michigan	Austin (NAHL)	—
26	(United States)	Evan Orr	Freshman	D	5' 11" (1.8 m)	185 lb (84 kg)	2001-01-09	Shelby Township, Michigan	Northeast (NAHL)	—
27	(Canada)	Brett Thorne (C)	Junior	D	6' 2" (1.88 m)	210 lb (95 kg)	1998-03-15	Halifax, Nova Scotia	Carleton Place (CCHL)	—
28	(United States)	Tristan Ashbrook	Senior	F	5' 11" (1.8 m)	175 lb (79 kg)	1998-07-16	Manistique, Michigan	RPI (ECAC)	—
29	(Canada)	Jack Works	Junior	F	6' 0" (1.83 m)	185 lb (84 kg)	2001-05-23	Yellowknife, Northwest Territories	Denver (NCHC)	—
30	(Finland)	Max Väyrynen	Freshman	G	6' 2" (1.88 m)	183 lb (83 kg)	2002-06-18	Espoo, Finland	Ässät U20 (U20 SM-sarja)	—
31	(United States)	Blake Pietila	Senior	G	5' 11" (1.8 m)	170 lb (77 kg)	2000-01-27	Howell, Michigan	Cedar Rapids (USHL)	—
35	(United States)	Michael Morelli	Freshman	G	6' 0" (1.83 m)	154 lb (70 kg)	2001-04-25	Arvada, Colorado	Maryland (NAHL)	—

== Standings ==
2022–23 Central Collegiate Hockey Association Standings
	Conference record										Overall record					
	GP	W	L	T	OTW	OTL	SW	PTS	GF	GA	GP	W	L	T	GF	GA
#12 Minnesota State †*	26	16	9	1	2	4	1	52	83	56	39	25	13	1	126	81
#13 Michigan Tech	26	15	7	4	0	1	0	50	68	54	39	24	11	4	103	88
Bowling Green	26	12	12	2	0	2	1	41	89	76	36	15	19	2	114	114
Northern Michigan	26	14	12	0	3	0	0	39	82	77	38	21	17	0	123	103
Bemidji State	26	12	11	3	3	1	2	39	73	63	36	14	17	5	94	97
Ferris State	26	9	14	3	1	2	3	34	62	91	37	14	19	4	92	131
St. Thomas	26	10	14	2	1	1	0	32	69	81	36	11	23	2	86	117
Lake Superior State	26	8	17	1	2	1	1	25	52	80	36	9	25	2	71	118
Championship: March 18, 2023 † indicates conference regular season champion (MacNaughton Cup) * indicates conference tournament champion (Mason Cup); Rankings: USCHO.com Top 20 Poll

== Schedule and results ==
Date	Time	Opponent^{#}	Rank^{#}	Site	TV	Decision	Result	Attendance	Record
Exhibition
October 1	2:07 PM	Lake Superior State*	#20	MacInnes Student Ice Arena • Houghton, Michigan (Exhibition)	FloHockey	Pietila	W 5–2	2,470	
October 3	6:07 PM	Lakehead*		MacInnes Student Ice Arena • Houghton, Michigan (Exhibition)	FloHockey	Väyrynen	W 6–0	2,016	
Regular Season
October 7	7:07 PM	at Ferris State*		Ewigleben Arena • Big Rapids, Michigan	FloHockey	Pietila	L 1–2	1,804	0–1–0
October 8	7:00 PM	at USNTDP*		USA Hockey Arena • Plymouth, Michigan (Exhibition)	FloHockey	Väyrynen	L 2–6	1,778	
October 13	11:37 PM	at Alaska*		Carlson Center • Fairbanks, Alaska	FloHockey	Pietila	W 2–0	1,912	1–1–0
October 14	11:07 PM	at Alaska*		Carlson Center • Fairbanks, Alaska	FloHockey	Pietila	W 6–2	2,124	2–1–0
October 21	7:07 PM	Bemidji State		MacInnes Student Ice Arena • Houghton, Michigan	FloHockey	Pietila	L 2–5	3,260	2–2–0 (0–1–0)
October 22	6:07 PM	Bemidji State		MacInnes Student Ice Arena • Houghton, Michigan	FloHockey	Väyrynen	T 2–2 ^{SOL}	3,092	2–2–1 (0–1–1)
October 28	7:07 PM	St. Lawrence*		MacInnes Student Ice Arena • Houghton, Michigan	FloHockey	Pietila	W 6–0	2,661	3–2–1
October 29	6:07 PM	St. Lawrence*		MacInnes Student Ice Arena • Houghton, Michigan	FloHockey	Pietila	W 3–0	2,963	4–2–1
November 4	7:07 PM	at Bowling Green		Slater Family Ice Arena • Bowling Green, Ohio	FloHockey	Pietila	W 3–2	2,350	5–2–1 (1–1–1)
November 5	7:07 PM	at Bowling Green		Slater Family Ice Arena • Bowling Green, Ohio	FloHockey	Pietila	L 1–6	2,872	5–3–1 (1–2–1)
November 11	7:07 PM	Lake Superior State		MacInnes Student Ice Arena • Houghton, Michigan	FloHockey	Pietila	T 2–2 ^{SOL}	3,024	5–3–2 (1–2–2)
November 12	6:07 PM	Lake Superior State		MacInnes Student Ice Arena • Houghton, Michigan	FloHockey	Pietila	W 2–0	2,996	6–3–2 (2–2–2)
November 18	8:07 PM	at St. Thomas		St. Thomas Ice Arena • Mendota Heights, Minnesota	FloHockey	Pietila	W 6–2	816	7–3–2 (3–2–2)
November 19	7:07 PM	at St. Thomas		St. Thomas Ice Arena • Mendota Heights, Minnesota	FloHockey	Pietila	W 4–3	815	8–3–2 (4–2–2)
November 25	7:07 PM	#10 Minnesota State		MacInnes Student Ice Arena • Houghton, Michigan	FloHockey	Pietila	W 3–2	2,492	9–3–2 (5–2–2)
November 26	6:07 PM	#10 Minnesota State		MacInnes Student Ice Arena • Houghton, Michigan	FloHockey	Pietila	T 2–2 ^{SOL}	2,418	9–3–3 (5–2–3)
December 2	6:37 PM	at Northern Michigan	#19	Berry Events Center • Marquette, Michigan (Rivalry)	FloHockey	Pietila	L 3–4 ^{OT}	4,263	9–4–3 (5–3–3)
December 3	6:07 PM	Northern Michigan	#19	MacInnes Student Ice Arena • Houghton, Michigan (Rivalry)	FloHockey	Pietila	W 3–1	4,025	10–4–3 (6–3–3)
December 16	7:07 PM	at Lake Superior State	#17	Taffy Abel Arena • Sault Ste. Marie, Michigan	FloHockey	Pietila	L 0–3	713	10–5–3 (6–4–3)
December 17	6:07 PM	at Lake Superior State	#17	Taffy Abel Arena • Sault Ste. Marie, Michigan	FloHockey	Väyrynen	W 5–1	759	11–5–3 (7–4–3)
Great Lakes Invitational
December 27	3:30 PM	vs. #18 Western Michigan*	#17	Van Andel Arena • Grand Rapids, Michigan (Great Lakes Invitational Semifinal)		Pietila	L 1–8	-	11–6–3
December 28	3:30 PM	vs. #11 Michigan State*	#17	Van Andel Arena • Grand Rapids, Michigan (Great Lakes Invitational Consolation)		Pietila	W 3–2	6,486	12–6–3
Desert Hockey Classic
January 6	9:00 PM	at Arizona State*	#16	Mullett Arena • Tempe, Arizona (Desert Hockey Classic Semifinal)		Pietila	W 4–2	4,956	13–6–3
January 7	5:30 PM	vs. #6 Boston University*	#16	Mullett Arena • Tempe, Arizona (Desert Hockey Classic Championship)		Pietila	W 3–2	-	14–6–3
Regular Season
January 13	7:07 PM	St. Thomas	#13	MacInnes Student Ice Arena • Houghton, Michigan	FloHockey	Pietila	W 2–0	2,873	15–6–3 (8–4–3)
January 14	6:07 PM	St. Thomas	#13	MacInnes Student Ice Arena • Houghton, Michigan	FloHockey	Pietila	L 2–3	3,324	15–7–3 (8–5–3)
January 20	7:07 PM	at Ferris State	#14	Ewigleben Arena • Big Rapids, Michigan	FloHockey	Pietila	W 1–0	2,156	16–7–3 (9–5–3)
January 21	6:07 PM	at Ferris State	#14	Ewigleben Arena • Big Rapids, Michigan	FloHockey	Pietila	T 3–3 ^{SOL}	2,501	16–7–4 (9–5–4)
January 27	7:07 PM	Northern Michigan	#13	MacInnes Student Ice Arena • Houghton, Michigan (Rivalry)	FloHockey	Pietila	W 3–0	4,179	17–7–4 (10–5–4)
January 28	6:37 PM	at Northern Michigan	#13	Berry Events Center • Marquette, Michigan (Rivalry)	FloHockey	Pietila	W 4–1	4,260	18–7–4 (11–5–4)
February 3	8:07 PM	at Bemidji State	#12	Sanford Center • Bemidji, Minnesota	FloHockey	Pietila	W 2–0	1,931	19–7–4 (12–5–4)
February 4	7:07 PM	at Bemidji State	#12	Sanford Center • Bemidji, Minnesota	FloHockey	Pietila	W 3–2	2,845	20–7–4 (13–5–4)
February 10	7:07 PM	Bowling Green	#12	MacInnes Student Ice Arena • Houghton, Michigan (Winter Carnival)	FloHockey	Pietila	L 2–5	3,938	20–8–4 (13–6–4)
February 11	5:07 PM	Bowling Green	#12	MacInnes Student Ice Arena • Houghton, Michigan (Winter Carnival)	FloHockey	Pietila	W 4–2	4,019	21–8–4 (14–6–4)
February 24	8:07 PM	at #12 Minnesota State	#11	Mayo Clinic Health System Event Center • Mankato, Minnesota	KEYC	Pietila	W 2–0	4,716	22–8–4 (15–6–4)
February 25	7:07 PM	at #12 Minnesota State	#11	Mayo Clinic Health System Event Center • Mankato, Minnesota	KEYC	Pietila	L 2–3	5,120	22–9–4 (15–7–4)
CCHA Tournament
March 3	7:07 PM	St. Thomas*	#11	MacInnes Student Ice Arena • Houghton, Michigan (Quarterfinal Game 1)	FloHockey	Pietila	W 1–0	2,338	23–9–4
March 4	6:07 PM	St. Thomas*	#11	MacInnes Student Ice Arena • Houghton, Michigan (Quarterfinal Game 2)	FloHockey	Pietila	W 5–4	2,587	24–9–4
March 11	6:07 PM	Northern Michigan*	#10	MacInnes Student Ice Arena • Houghton, Michigan (Semifinal, Rivalry)	FloHockey	Pietila	L 0–4	3,930	24–10–4
NCAA Tournament
March 24	5:00 PM	vs. #11 Penn State*	#13	PPL Center • Allentown, Pennsylvania (Midwest Regional Semifinal)	ESPNU	Pietila	L 0–8	7,067	24–11–4
*Non-conference game. ^{#}Rankings from USCHO.com Poll. All times are in Eastern Time. Source:

== Scoring statistics ==
Name	Position	Games	Goals	Assists	Points	PIM
Ryland Mosley	LW	39	12	19	31	13
Kyle Kukkonen	C	39	18	9	27	18
Logan Pietila	F	39	11	11	22	10
Parker Saretsky	F	29	7	13	20	8
Brett Thorne	D	34	3	15	18	34
Tristan Ashbrook	RW	37	10	7	17	14
Jack Works	F	39	8	9	17	12
Jed Pietila	D	35	1	15	16	26
Jake Crespi	D	34	4	10	14	30
Nick Nardella	RW	32	1	13	14	12
Kash Rasmussen	F	37	5	6	11	17
Chris Lipe	D	30	2	8	10	22
David Jankowski	C	28	4	5	9	2
Arvid Caderoth	C/RW	38	2	7	9	31
Logan Ganie	LW	24	3	4	7	8
Topi Heiskanen	D	24	0	7	7	2
Evan Orr	D	28	2	4	6	8
Levi Stauber	F	28	2	3	5	2
Trevor Russell	D	16	4	0	4	10
Tyrone Bronte	C	32	3	1	4	12
Ryan O'Connell	D	35	0	3	3	14
Alex Nordstrom	F	16	0	2	2	4
Marcus Pedersen	LW/RW	16	1	0	1	0
Frank Dovorany	D	1	0	0	0	0
Kasper Vähärautio	D	3	0	0	0	0
Max Väyrynen	G	4	0	0	0	0
Blais Richartz	F	4	0	0	0	0
Trevor Kukkonen	F	6	0	0	0	4
Blake Pietila	G	37	0	0	0	0
Total			103	171	274	321

== Goaltending statistics ==
Name	Games	Minutes	Wins	Losses	Ties	Goals against	Saves	Shut outs	SV %	GAA
Blake Pietila	37	2173:57	23	11	3	78	951	10	.924	2.15
Max Väyrynen	4	180:39	1	0	1	7	65	0	.903	2.32
Empty Net	-	10:28	-	-	-	3	-	-	-	-
Total	39	2365:04	24	11	4	88	1016	10	.920	2.23

== Rankings ==
Poll	Week																											
Poll	Pre	1	2	3	4	5	6	7	8	9	10	11	12	13	14	15	16	17	18	19	20	21	22	23	24	25	26	27 (Final)
USCHO.com	20	-	NR	NR	NR	NR	NR	NR	NR	NR	19	18	17	-	16	13	14	13	12	12	12	11	11	10	13	13	-	13
USA Today	NR	20	NR	NR	NR	NR	NR	NR	NR	20	18	18	17	16	16	13	14	13	12	12	13	11	11	10	13	13	13	13

Note: USCHO did not release a poll in weeks 1, 13, or 26.

== Awards and honors ==
Player	Award	Ref
Blake Pietila	AHCA West All-American First Team	
Blake Pietila	CCHA Player of the Year	
Blake Pietila	CCHA Goaltender of the Year	
Kyle Kukkonen	CCHA Rookie of the Year	
Joe Shawhan	CCHA Coach of the Year	
Blake Pietila	CCHA First Team	
Ryland Mosley	CCHA First Team	
Brett Thorne	CCHA Second Team	
Kyle Kukkonen	CCHA Rookie Team	
