= 2023–24 St. Thomas (Minnesota) Tommies men's ice hockey season =

2023–24 St. Thomas Tommies men's ice hockey season
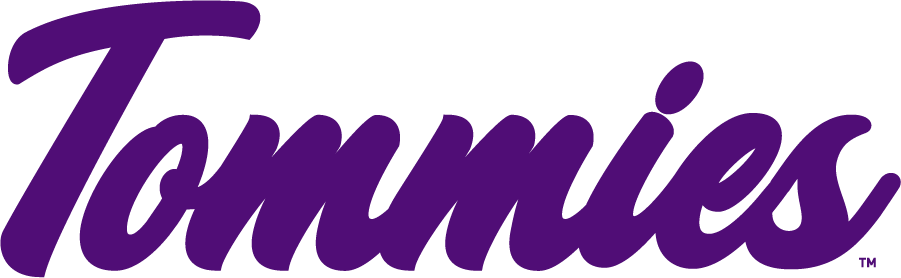
- Conference: T–2nd CCHA
- Home ice: St. Thomas Ice Arena

Rankings
- USCHO: NR
- USA Hockey: NR

Record
- Overall: 15–20–2
- Conference: 12–11–1
- Home: 8–8–2
- Road: 7–11–0
- Neutral: 0–1–0

Coaches and captains
- Head coach: Enrico Blasi
- Assistant coaches: Leon Hayward; Cory Laylin
- Captain: Lucas Wahlin
- Alternate captain(s): Mack Byers; Luke Manning

The 2023–24 St. Thomas Tommies men's ice hockey season was the 100th season of play for the program, the 3rd in Division I and the 3rd in the CCHA. The Tommies represented the University of St. Thomas (Minnesota), played their home games at the St. Thomas Ice Arena, and were coached by Enrico Blasi in his 3rd season.

== Season ==
High roster turnover continued to remake the Tommies as the team was looking to fully become a Division I program. Most of the departed personnel were from their D-III era and were replaced by ones with a higher level of talent, several of whom were transfers. St. Thomas demonstrated just how much they had chanced when the team opened with a pair of 1-goal decisions against #8 St. Cloud State, splitting the home-and-home series. While they weren't quite as successful the following week against the #2 team in the nation, the fact that the team was able to push Minnesota into overtime spoke volumes. One early development for the Tommies was the introduction of a goaltending rotation that saw Aaron Trotter share responsibilities with Niagara transfer Jake Sibell. St. Thomas benefitted from the arrangement and saw the club put together a 5-game winning streak in November to climb to the top of the conference standings.

The offense, too, was looking better through the first two months of the season. While the team had been shutout three times early in the year, the winning streak saw the Tommies' production soar to new heights and make it possible for the team to possess a winning record by December. Unfortunately, the scoring became inconsistent afterward and the Tommies stumbled to the winter break. In the final seven games of 2023, the offense scored more than 2 goals just once and lost five of those matches.

St. Thomas didn't restart its conference schedule until mid-January, but the time off seemed to help the team. Upon their return, the Tommies swept Michigan Tech for the first time in school history and regained the top spot in the conference. However, after splitting the succeeding two weekend series, the team ran into another rough patch. In February the goaltending began to flag and St. Thomas won just once in their final eight games. The losses cost the Tommies their chance at a regular season title, but they still managed to finish 2nd. Unfortunately, injuries played a large part in the second half of the season for the Tommies. They began to rack up in December and continued consistently the rest of the year. This forced defensemen Jase Sofo and Braidan Simmons-Fischer to play out of position at forward beginning in January. By the time the CCHA playoffs began, 8 players were injured and unable to play, and St. Thomas only had 17 healthy skaters (non-goalies) available to dress, when teams are permitted to play up to 19 for a game.

The team's reward was a meeting with Lake Superior State and their first home playoff game since joining the CCHA. However, despite their position in the standings, St. Thomas was not heavily favored in the series. Aside from the skid to end the season, the Tommies only had one more win than the Lakers in conference play and actually had a (slightly) worse overall record. The teams then demonstrated their similarity by splitting the first two games in the quarterfinals to set up a deciding third game. St. Thomas was able to use its power play to get two 1-goal leads and carried the advantage deep into the third, but they could not sustain their edge. Both teams continued to fight for the next goal over the final nine minutes of the game. Just when it appeared that the match was destined for overtime, Lake Superior got on a rush and fired a strong shot on goal. Trotter made a tremendous save, but the puck bound high in the air and fell at the feet of a Laker player standing in the crease. He slammed the rubber home before any of the purple defenders could stop him and gave Lake State the winning marker with under 7 seconds to play.

An exhibition match against USNTDP that was scheduled for January 27 was cancelled.

== Departures ==
Player	Position	Nationality	Cause
Henry Baribeau	Goaltender	United States	Graduation (retired)
Garrett Daly	Defenseman	United States	Graduation (retired)
Josh Eernisse	Forward	United States	Transferred to Michigan
Matt Jennings	Forward	United States	Graduation (signed with Adirondack Thunder)
Andrew Kangas	Forward	United States	Graduation (signed with Adirondack Thunder)
Luke Kron	Forward	United States	Left program
Trevor LeDonne	Defenseman	Canada	Transferred to Robert Morris
Jarrett Lee	Forward	United States	Graduation (signed with Wheeling Nailers)
Luke Perunovich	Defenseman	United States	Graduation (retired)
Ethan Roberts	Goaltender	United States	Transferred to Utica
Nolan Sawchuk	Defenseman	United States	Graduation (retired)
Blaine Warnert	Forward	United States	Transferred to Augsburg
Trevor Zins	Defenseman	United States	Graduation (signed with Indy Fuel)

== Recruiting ==
Player	Position	Nationality	Age	Notes
Tobias Abrahamsson	Defenseman	Sweden	20	Jönköping, SWE
Chase Cheslock	Defenseman	United States	19	Rogers, MN; joined mid-season; selected 154th overall in 2023
Ryder Donovan	Forward	United States	22	Duluth, MN; graduate transfer from Wisconsin; selected 110th overall in 2019
Matthew Gleason	Forward	United States	21	Saint Paul, MN; transfer from Colorado College
Liam Malmquist	Forward	United States	22	Edina, MN; transfer from Wisconsin
James Marooney	Defenseman	United States	24	Chaska, MN; graduate transfer from Ohio State
J. D. Metz	Defenseman/Forward	United States	20	Mahtomedi, MN
Cole Miller	Defenseman	United States	21	Littleton, CO
Mason Poolman	Defenseman	United States	21	East Grand Forks, MN
Maximilian Prazma	Goaltender	Canada	21	Calgary, AB
Noah Prokop	Forward	United States	23	Highlands Ranch, CO; graduate transfer from Colorado College
Jake Ratzlaff	Defenseman	United States	21	Rosemount, MN
Jake Sibell	Goaltender	United States	23	Isanti, MN; transfer from Niagara
Jase Sofo	Defenseman	United States	21	Sylvania, OH

== Roster ==
As of December 28, 2023.

No.	Nat.	Player	Class	Pos	Height	Weight	DoB	Hometown	Previous team	NHL rights
2	(United States)	James Marooney	Graduate	D	5' 9" (1.75 m)	175 lb (79 kg)	1999-08-16	Chaska, Minnesota	Ohio State (Big Ten)	—
3	(United States)	Lucas Wahlin (C)	Sophomore	F	5' 11" (1.8 m)	160 lb (73 kg)	2001-05-03	Woodbury, Minnesota	Lincoln Stars (NAHL)	—
4	(United States)	Cole Miller	Freshman	D	5' 11" (1.8 m)	185 lb (84 kg)	2002-08-27	Littleton, Colorado	Sioux Falls Stampede (USHL)	—
5	(United States)	Matthew Gleason	Senior	F	5' 8" (1.73 m)	175 lb (79 kg)	2001-09-20	Saint Paul, Minnesota	Colorado College (NCHC)	—
6	(United States)	Jake Ratzlaff	Freshman	D	6' 2" (1.88 m)	220 lb (100 kg)	2002-06-23	Rosemount, Minnesota	Madison Capitols (USHL)	—
8	(United States)	Cameron Recchi	Junior	F	5' 10" (1.78 m)	165 lb (75 kg)	2001-05-24	Pittsburgh, Pennsylvania	Salmon Arm Silverbacks (BCHL)	—
10	(United States)	Mason Poolman	Freshman	D	6' 1" (1.85 m)	189 lb (86 kg)	2002-01-31	East Grand Forks, Minnesota	Penticton Vees (BCHL)	—
11	(United States)	Ryan O'Neill	Sophomore	F	5' 10" (1.78 m)	175 lb (79 kg)	2001-02-25	Roseville, Minnesota	St. Cloud Norsemen (NAHL)	—
12	(United States)	Tim Piechowski	Junior	F	6' 2" (1.88 m)	210 lb (95 kg)	2000-12-08	Eden Prairie, Minnesota	Bismarck Bobcats (NAHL)	—
13	(United States)	Noah Prokop	Graduate	F	6' 1" (1.85 m)	204 lb (93 kg)	2000-01-15	Highlands Ranch, Colorado	Colorado College (NCHC)	—
14	(United States)	Jase Sofo	Freshman	D	6' 4" (1.93 m)	190 lb (86 kg)	2002-06-25	Sylvania, Ohio	Amarillo Bulls (NAHL)	—
15	(Canada)	Quinton Pepper	Sophomore	F	6' 3" (1.91 m)	187 lb (85 kg)	2002-01-31	London, Ontario	Steinbach Pistons (MJHL)	—
16	(United States)	Luke Manning (A)	Graduate	F	5' 10" (1.78 m)	190 lb (86 kg)	1999-04-13	Stillwater, Minnesota	Air Force (AHA)	—
17	(United States)	Jake Braccini	Sophomore	F	5' 11" (1.8 m)	192 lb (87 kg)	2001-07-02	Hanover, Minnesota	Muskegon Lumberjacks (USHL)	—
18	(United States)	Ethan Gauer	Senior	D	6' 0" (1.83 m)	185 lb (84 kg)	1999-12-23	Farmington, Minnesota	Bemidji State (WCHA)	—
19	(United States)	Luc Laylin	Sophomore	F	5' 8" (1.73 m)	170 lb (77 kg)	2001-12-30	St. Michael, Minnesota	Prince George Spruce Kings (BCHL)	—
20	(United States)	Cooper Gay	Sophomore	F	6' 4" (1.93 m)	210 lb (95 kg)	2002-03-15	Edina, Minnesota	Fargo Force (USHL)	—
21	(United States)	Carson Peters	Sophomore	D	6' 3" (1.91 m)	200 lb (91 kg)	2002-10-28	Medina, Minnesota	Cedar Rapids RoughRiders (USHL)	—
22	(United States)	Mack Byers (A)	Senior	F	6' 1" (1.85 m)	190 lb (86 kg)	1999-02-08	Long Lake, Minnesota	Northern Michigan (CCHA)	—
24	(United States)	Grant Docter	Junior	D	5' 10" (1.78 m)	174 lb (79 kg)	2000-12-06	Golden Valley, Minnesota	Michigan Tech (CCHA)	—
25	(United States)	Liam Malmquist	Junior	F	5' 10" (1.78 m)	165 lb (75 kg)	2000-10-08	Edina, Minnesota	Wisconsin (Big Ten)	—
26	(United States)	Chase Cheslock	Freshman	D	6' 3" (1.91 m)	205 lb (93 kg)	2004-10-25	Rogers, Minnesota	Omaha Lancers (USHL)	NJD, 154th overall 2023
27	(United States)	Ryder Donovan	Graduate	F	6' 3" (1.91 m)	203 lb (92 kg)	2000-10-04	Duluth, Minnesota	Wisconsin (Big Ten)	VGK, 110th overall 2019
28	(United States)	Braidan Simmons-Fischer	Sophomore	D	6' 7" (2.01 m)	220 lb (100 kg)	2002-01-26	Detroit, Michigan	Austin Bruins (NAHL)	—
29	(United States)	J. D. Metz	Freshman	F/D	6' 2" (1.88 m)	195 lb (88 kg)	2002-10-24	Mahtomedi, Minnesota	New Mexico Ice Wolves (NAHL)	—
30	(United States)	Jake Sibell	Junior	G	6' 2" (1.88 m)	205 lb (93 kg)	2000-01-03	Isanti, Minnesota	Niagara (AHA)	—
31	(Canada)	Aaron Trotter	Sophomore	G	6' 2" (1.88 m)	170 lb (77 kg)	2001-04-07	Victoria, British Columbia	Prince George Spruce Kings (BCHL)	—
39	(Canada)	Maximilian Prazma	Freshman	G	6' 4" (1.93 m)	200 lb (91 kg)	2002-01-12	Calgary, Alberta	Calgary Canucks (AJHL)	—
42	(Sweden)	Tobias Abrahamsson	Freshman	D	6' 4" (1.93 m)	214 lb (97 kg)	2003-08-30	Jönköping, Sweden	HV71 J20 (J20 Nationell)	—

== Standings ==
2023–24 Central Collegiate Hockey Association Standings
	Conference record										Overall record					
	GP	W	L	T	OTW	OTL	SW	PTS	GF	GA	GP	W	L	T	GF	GA
Bemidji State †	24	15	7	2	2	1	2	48	82	64	38	20	16	2	117	111
St. Thomas	24	12	11	1	0	2	0	39	68	62	37	15	20	2	97	105
#19 Michigan Tech*	24	12	10	2	1	2	0	39	63	54	40	19	15	6	109	102
Minnesota State	24	12	10	2	2	1	1	38	73	62	37	18	15	4	111	96
Northern Michigan	24	10	10	4	1	1	2	36	57	67	34	12	16	6	83	105
Bowling Green	24	11	12	1	1	1	1	35	60	69	36	13	22	1	86	116
Lake Superior State	24	11	12	1	2	2	0	34	79	73	38	17	20	1	114	113
Ferris State	24	6	17	1	3	2	1	19	49	80	36	10	24	2	83	125
Augustana ^	0	0	0	0	0	0	0	0	0	0	34	12	18	4	90	105
Championship: March 22, 2024 † indicates conference regular season champion (MacNaughton Cup) * indicates conference tournament champion (Mason Cup)^ Augustana is playing a transition schedule of 16 games against conference opponents that are not counted in the standings Rankings: USCHO.com Top 20 Poll

== Schedule and results ==
Date	Time	Opponent^{#}	Rank^{#}	Site	TV	Decision	Result	Attendance	Record
Regular Season
October 7	6:00 pm	at #8 St. Cloud State*		Herb Brooks National Hockey Center • St. Cloud, Minnesota	Fox 9+	Trotter	W 5–4 ^{OT}	4,863	1–0–0
October 8	4:07 pm	#8 St. Cloud State*		St. Thomas Ice Arena • Mendota Heights, Minnesota	FloHockey	Trotter	L 0–1	556	1–1–0
October 13	7:30 pm	vs. #2 Minnesota*		Xcel Energy Center • Saint Paul, Minnesota	FloHockey	Trotter	L 5–6 ^{OT}	11,376	1–2–0
October 14	6:00 pm	at #2 Minnesota*		3M Arena at Mariucci • Minneapolis, Minnesota		Sibell	L 0–3	9,862	1–3–0
October 20	7:07 pm	Lindenwood*		St. Thomas Ice Arena • Mendota Heights, Minnesota	FloHockey	Trotter	T 4–4 ^{OT}	778	1–3–1
October 21	7:07 pm	Lindenwood*		St. Thomas Ice Arena • Mendota Heights, Minnesota	FloHockey	Sibell	W 3–1	668	2–3–1
October 27	7:07 pm	at Bemidji State		Sanford Center • Bemidji, Minnesota	FloHockey	Trotter	L 2–3	1,686	2–4–1 (0–1–0)
October 28	6:07 pm	at Bemidji State		Sanford Center • Bemidji, Minnesota	FloHockey	Sibell	L 0–2	1,643	2–5–1 (0–2–0)
November 3	7:07 pm	Northern Michigan		St. Thomas Ice Arena • Mendota Heights, Minnesota	FloHockey	Trotter	W 4–2	614	3–5–1 (1–2–0)
November 4	6:07 pm	Northern Michigan		St. Thomas Ice Arena • Mendota Heights, Minnesota	FloHockey	Sibell	W 6–1	922	4–5–1 (2–2–0)
November 10	6:07 pm	at Bowling Green		Slater Family Ice Arena • Bowling Green, Ohio	FloHockey	Trotter	W 4–1	2,172	5–5–1 (3–2–0)
November 11	6:07 pm	at Bowling Green		Slater Family Ice Arena • Bowling Green, Ohio	FloHockey	Sibell	W 4–3	2,180	6–5–1 (4–2–0)
November 24	7:07 pm	Lake Superior State		St. Thomas Ice Arena • Mendota Heights, Minnesota	FloHockey	Trotter	W 4–2	784	7–5–1 (5–2–0)
November 25	6:07 pm	Lake Superior State		St. Thomas Ice Arena • Mendota Heights, Minnesota	FloHockey	Sibell	L 1–3	826	7–6–1 (5–3–0)
December 1	6:07 pm	at Ferris State		Ewigleben Arena • Big Rapids, Michigan	FloHockey	Trotter	L 2–5	1,754	7–7–1 (5–4–0)
December 2	5:07 pm	at Ferris State		Ewigleben Arena • Big Rapids, Michigan	FloHockey	Sibell	W 7–1	1,834	8–7–1 (6–4–0)
December 8	7:07 pm	at Minnesota State		Mayo Clinic Health System Event Center • Mankato, Minnesota	FloHockey	Trotter	L 1–3	4,557	8–8–1 (6–5–0)
December 9	6:07 pm	Minnesota State		St. Thomas Ice Arena • Mendota Heights, Minnesota	FloHockey	Sibell	W 2–1	1,010	9–8–1 (7–5–0)
December 29	6:00 pm	at Vermont*		Gutterson Fieldhouse • Burlington, Vermont	ESPN+	Trotter	L 1–5	2,595	9–9–1
December 30	4:00 pm	at Vermont*		Gutterson Fieldhouse • Burlington, Vermont	ESPN+	Sibell	L 1–4	2,652	9–10–1
January 6	4:07 pm	Minnesota Duluth*		St. Thomas Ice Arena • Mendota Heights, Minnesota (Exhibition)	FloHockey	Sibell	W 3–1	1,058	
January 11	7:07 pm	Michigan Tech		St. Thomas Ice Arena • Mendota Heights, Minnesota	FloHockey	Trotter	W 4–3	1,021	10–10–1 (8–5–0)
January 13	5:07 pm	Michigan Tech		St. Thomas Ice Arena • Mendota Heights, Minnesota	FloHockey	Sibell	W 3–1	1,059	11–10–1 (9–5–0)
January 19	6:07 pm	at Northern Michigan		Berry Events Center • Marquette, Michigan	FloHockey	Trotter	L 2–3	2,562	11–11–1 (9–6–0)
January 20	5:07 pm	at Northern Michigan		Berry Events Center • Marquette, Michigan	FloHockey	Sibell	W 3–1	—	12–11–1 (10–6–0)
February 2	7:07 pm	Minnesota State		St. Thomas Ice Arena • Mendota Heights, Minnesota	FloHockey	Trotter	L 3–4 ^{OT}	1,038	12–12–1 (10–7–0)
February 3	6:07 pm	at Minnesota State		Mayo Clinic Health System Event Center • Mankato, Minnesota	FloHockey	Trotter	W 4–2	4,973	13–12–1 (11–7–0)
February 9	7:07 pm	at Augustana*		Midco Arena • Sioux Falls, South Dakota	FloHockey, Midco	Sibell	L 2–4	2,422	13–13–1
February 10	6:07 pm	at Augustana*		Midco Arena • Sioux Falls, South Dakota	FloHockey, Midco	Trotter	L 1–2 ^{OT}	2,591	13–14–1
February 16	7:07 pm	Bowling Green		St. Thomas Ice Arena • Mendota Heights, Minnesota	FloHockey	Trotter	T 3–3 ^{SOL}	894	13–14–2 (11–7–1)
February 17	6:07 pm	Bowling Green		St. Thomas Ice Arena • Mendota Heights, Minnesota	FloHockey	Sibell	L 1–3	796	13–15–2 (11–8–1)
February 23	7:07 pm	Bemidji State		St. Thomas Ice Arena • Mendota Heights, Minnesota	FloHockey	Trotter	L 5–6	1,014	13–16–2 (11–9–1)
February 24	6:07 pm	Bemidji State		St. Thomas Ice Arena • Mendota Heights, Minnesota	FloHockey	Sibell	L 1–3	1,008	13–17–2 (11–10–1)
March 1	6:07 pm	at Michigan Tech		MacInnes Student Ice Arena • Houghton, Michigan	FloHockey	Trotter	W 2–0	2,371	14–17–2 (12–10–1)
March 2	6:07 pm	at Michigan Tech		MacInnes Student Ice Arena • Houghton, Michigan	FloHockey	Sibell	L 0–6	2,851	14–18–2 (12–11–1)
CCHA Tournament
March 8	7:07 pm	Lake Superior State*		St. Thomas Ice Arena • Mendota Heights, Minnesota (Quarterfinal Game 1)	FloHockey	Trotter	L 1–4	506	14–19–2
March 9	6:07 pm	Lake Superior State*		St. Thomas Ice Arena • Mendota Heights, Minnesota (Quarterfinal Game 2)	FloHockey	Trotter	W 4–2	495	15–19–2
March 10	5:07 pm	Lake Superior State*		St. Thomas Ice Arena • Mendota Heights, Minnesota (Quarterfinal Game 3)	FloHockey	Trotter	L 2–3	437	15–20–2
*Non-conference game. ^{#}Rankings from USCHO.com Poll. All times are in Central Time. Source:

== Scoring statistics ==
Name	Position	Games	Goals	Assists	Points	PIM
Lucas Wahlin	F	37	12	18	30	48
Liam Malmquist	F	36	10	17	27	10
Ryan O'Neill	F	35	7	19	26	12
Matthew Gleason	C	37	5	18	23	26
Mack Byers	LW	31	13	8	21	4
Cooper Gay	RW	29	12	9	21	28
Luc Laylin	F	37	9	6	15	6
Luke Manning	C	37	7	6	13	14
Ethan Gauer	D	37	0	12	12	26
Quinton Pepper	RW	31	3	7	10	10
Jake Braccini	RW	24	4	5	9	8
Noah Prokop	C	27	3	5	8	16
Mason Poolman	D	28	2	6	8	16
Cole Miller	D	37	1	6	7	47
Grant Docter	D	22	0	7	7	8
James Marooney	D	15	0	5	5	6
Tim Piechowski	RW	20	3	1	4	4
J. D. Metz	D/F	24	2	2	4	0
Chase Cheslock	D	19	1	2	3	6
Carson Peters	D	37	0	3	3	22
Tobias Abrahamsson	D	37	0	3	3	0
Aaron Trotter	G	24	0	2	2	0
Ryder Donovan	C/RW	3	1	0	1	4
Cameron Recchi	C/LW	5	1	0	1	2
Jase Sofo	D	18	1	0	1	14
Braidan Simmons-Fischer	D	6	0	1	1	6
Jake Ratzlaff	D	14	0	1	1	2
Jake Sibell	G	15	0	1	1	0
Total			97	170	267	351

== Goaltending statistics ==
Name	Games	Minutes	Wins	Losses	Ties	Goals against	Saves	Shut outs	SV %	GAA
Jake Sibell	16	852:10	7	8	0	31	372	0	.923	2.18
Aaron Trotter	24	1357:56	8	12	2	68	627	1	.902	3.00
Empty Net	-	30:40	-	-	-	6	-	-	-	-
Total	37	2240:46	15	20	2	111	999	1	.905	2.81

== Rankings ==
Poll	Week																										
Poll	Pre	1	2	3	4	5	6	7	8	9	10	11	12	13	14	15	16	17	18	19	20	21	22	23	24	25	26 (Final)
USCHO.com	NR	NR	NR	NR	NR	NR	NR	NR	NR	NR	NR	–	NR	NR	NR	NR	NR	NR	NR	NR	NR	NR	NR	NR	NR	–	NR
USA Hockey	NR	NR	NR	NR	NR	NR	NR	NR	NR	NR	NR	NR	–	NR	NR	NR	NR	NR	NR	NR	NR	NR	NR	NR	NR	NR	NR

Note: USCHO did not release a poll in weeks 11 and 25.
Note: USA Hockey did not release a poll in week 12.

== Awards and honors ==
Player	Award	Ref
Lucas Wahlin	CCHA Second Team	

== 2024 NHL entry draft ==
Round	Pick	Player	NHL team
7	218	Bauer Berry ^{†}	Edmonton Oilers

† incoming freshman
