= Ty Eigner =

American ice hockey head coach (born 1968)

Biographical details
- Born: November 8, 1968 (age 57); Oshkosh, Wisconsin, USA
- Education: Bowling Green State University

Playing career
- 1986–1987: Rochester Mustangs
- 1987–1988: St. Paul Vulcans
- 1988–1993: Bowling Green
- 1993–1994: Fort Worth Fire
- 1994–1995: Huntington Blizzard
- 1994–1995: Birmingham Bulls
- 1995–1996: Wichita Thunder
- 1995–1996: Tulsa Oilers
- Position: Defenseman

Coaching career (HC unless noted)
- 1996–1999: Rosemount HS
- 1999–2008: Brainerd HS
- 2008–2010: Eden Prairie HS (Associate)
- 2010–2019: Bowling Green (Assistant)
- 2019–2024: Bowling Green

Head coaching record
- Overall: 84–83–11 (.503)

Ty Eigner (born November 8, 1968) is an American ice hockey head coach who was the head hockey coach of the Bowling Green State University Men's Hockey team.

== Career ==
Though born in Wisconsin, Eigner grew up in Minnesota and was a standout player for Rosemount, topping two points per game in his final two years with the Fighting Irish. Despite his scoring numbers, Eigher played two seasons in the USHL after graduating before he got his first taste of college hockey. Eigner played sparingly in his first few seasons with Bowling Green under Jerry York but he grew into a leadership role with the team and served as captain for the 1992–93 campaign.

After Bowling Green, Eigner signed with the Fort Worth Fire and had a good season while the Fire finished last in the league. Eigner moved up to the ECHL the following year but after poor results he found himself back in the Central Hockey League and finished his playing career with the Tulsa Oilers.

In 1996, Eigner returned to Minnesota to coach at his old high school, earning the Section 5AA Coach of the Year award in his second season. Eigner moved on to Brainerd in 1999 and again won coach of the year, this time for Section 7AA in 2006. In his final season with Brainerd, Eigner received the Dave Peterson Award for demonstrating great leadership in the development of youth hockey. Eigner served as an associate head coach at Eden Prairie High School for two seasons, helping the team win the AA state championship.

In 2010, Chris Bergeron was hired as the head coach for Bowling Green, and he hired Eigner as an assistant coach. Due in part to the 2008 recession, Bowling Green was considering the termination of its varsity men's team, and Eigner was instrumental in reviving the foundering program. Eigner was tasked specifically with building the defensive corps over a nine-year span and helped to reduce the team's goals allowed from nearly 4 per game in 2010 to less than 2 per game in 2019.

In 2019, after the team made its first NCAA Tournament appearance since Eigher's playing days, Bergeron left the team to take an identical position with his alma mater, Miami. 15 days later, Eigner was named the 8th head coach of the BGSU Falcon Hockey program.

To begin the 2019-2020 season, Eigner's Falcons traveled to take on Bergeron's Redhawks in their respective coaching debuts at each school, with Eigner's Bowling Green team taking the win on the road, 7-4. The Falcons won a first round series on the road in Fairbanks, Alaska in March 2020, sweeping the Nanooks 4-2, 3-2. On the Thursday before their semifinal series against Bemidji State, the WCHA and NCAA announced that the rest of the season was canceled due to the COVID-19 outbreak, ending Eigner's first season in charge with an overall record of 21-13-4. After having a difficult January, the Falcons finished with a 10-game unbeaten streak (8-0-2), longest in the nation. That year, Eigner coached defenseman Alec Rauhauser to his second WCHA Defensive Player of the Year award and a 2nd-team All-American (West) finish, adding to his successful track record of developing tremendous defensive hockey players. Also in 2019-2020, the redesigned Falcon power play unit scored the most goals in Division I, and Eigner helped Connor Ford to be named to the All-WCHA Third Team.

In 2020–21, in the final year of the men's WCHA (Note: The women's WCHA remains in operation.) and a season shortened due to the COVID-19 pandemic, Bowling Green started the season on a scorching pace, winning 12 of their first 13 games and finding themselves at 16-4-0 through 20 games. Unfortunately, the hot start did not last, and the Falcons went 4-6-1 down the stretch, including their first quarterfinal playoff series loss since joining the WCHA in 2013, losing to Northern Michigan in three games. Still, with their 20-10-1 record, there was a thought that they may still have a chance at an at-large bid to the NCAA tournament, being one of the five programs in the country to win 20+ games on the season. However, those dreams were dashed on Selection Sunday, when the Falcons were left out for a 14-13-2 Notre Dame team from the Big Ten.

Still, 2020–21 had some great moments, as Bowling Green won the program’s 1,000th game in program history on January 16, 2021. In addition, three of Eigner’s Falcons were named as First Team All-WCHA performers, in seniors Brandon Kruse and Connor Ford, and junior Will Cullen, who also claimed Bowling Green’s third WCHA Defensive Player of the Year award in four seasons.

Just before the start of the 2023-2024 season, the team's leading scorer from last season, Austen Swankler, abruptly left school and entered the transfer portal. Shortly afterwards, Eigner was placed on leave and three players were suspended due to hazing allegations. A little over a month later, an independent investigation discovered that older players had provided alcohol for underaged persons at an off-campus event. There was no evidence that Eigner or any of his staff were aware of the behavior, so the coach was reinstated. However, due to the nature of the violation, the school's athletic director, Derek van der Merwe, began to directly oversee the program while requiring the coaching staff to receive additional training to prevent a recurrence. This incident was particularly galling for Bowling Green as the school was still recovering from the 2021 death of Stone Foltz that led to hazing becoming a felony under Ohio state law. Concluding their 3rd consecutive losing season with 6 straight losses to close the 2023-2024 season, Eigner was fired on March 11, 2024.

== Head coaching record ==
Record table
Season	Team	Overall	Conference	Standing	Postseason
Bowling Green Falcons (WCHA) (2019–2021)
2019–20	Bowling Green	21–13–4	14–10–4	5th	WCHA Semifinals (Tournament Canceled)
2020–21	Bowling Green	20–10–1	8–5–1	T–2nd	WCHA Quarterfinals
Bowling Green Falcons (CCHA) (2021–2024)
2021–22	Bowling Green	15–19–3	11–14–1	6th	CCHA Quarterfinals
2022–23	Bowling Green	15–19–2	12–12–2	3rd	CCHA Quarterfinals
2023–24	Bowling Green	13–22–1	11–12–1	6th	CCHA Quarterfinals
Bowling Green:		84–83–11	56–53–9		
Total:		84–83–11			
National champion Postseason invitational champion Conference regular season champion Conference regular season and conference tournament champion Division regular season champion Division regular season and conference tournament champion Conference tournament champion
