= Taffy Abel Arena =

Hockey arena in Sault Ste. Marie, Michigan

Clarence "Taffy" Abel Arena
- Interactive map of Clarence "Taffy" Abel Arena
- Former names: Norris Center
- Location: Sault Ste. Marie, MI 49783
- Coordinates: 46°29′24″N 84°21′58″W
- Owner: Lake Superior State University
- Operator: Lake Superior St. Univ.
- Capacity: 4,000 (hockey)
- Surface: 200 ft × 85 ft (61 m × 26 m) hockey

Construction
- Opened: 1976
- Renovated: October 28, 1995

Tenant
- Lake Superior State Lakers (ice hockey)

Clarence "Taffy" Abel Arena is a 4,000-seat hockey arena in Sault Ste. Marie, Michigan on the campus of Lake Superior State University. It is home to the Lake Superior State Lakers men's ice hockey team of the Central Collegiate Hockey Association. The arena is part of the Norris Center student athletic complex, which was built in 1976 and includes the 2,500-seat Cooper Gymnasium and other sports facilities for the school. The arena itself dates back to 1976; it was renovated and remodeled to its current larger form in the summer of 1995 following the Lakers' run of three national championships and eight straight NCAA tournament appearances, which continued into the first year of the arena. It was named after American ice hockey player Clarence "Taffy" Abel, who was born in Sault Ste. Marie. It was the only on-campus hockey arena in the United States which has a seating capacity greater than the enrollment of the school for which it is used, until the completion of Colorado College's Ed Robson Arena in 2021.

Both Abel Arena and Cooper Gym are available for other events, including high school basketball and hockey.
