= Slater Family Ice Arena =

Ice hockey venue in Bowling Green, Ohio

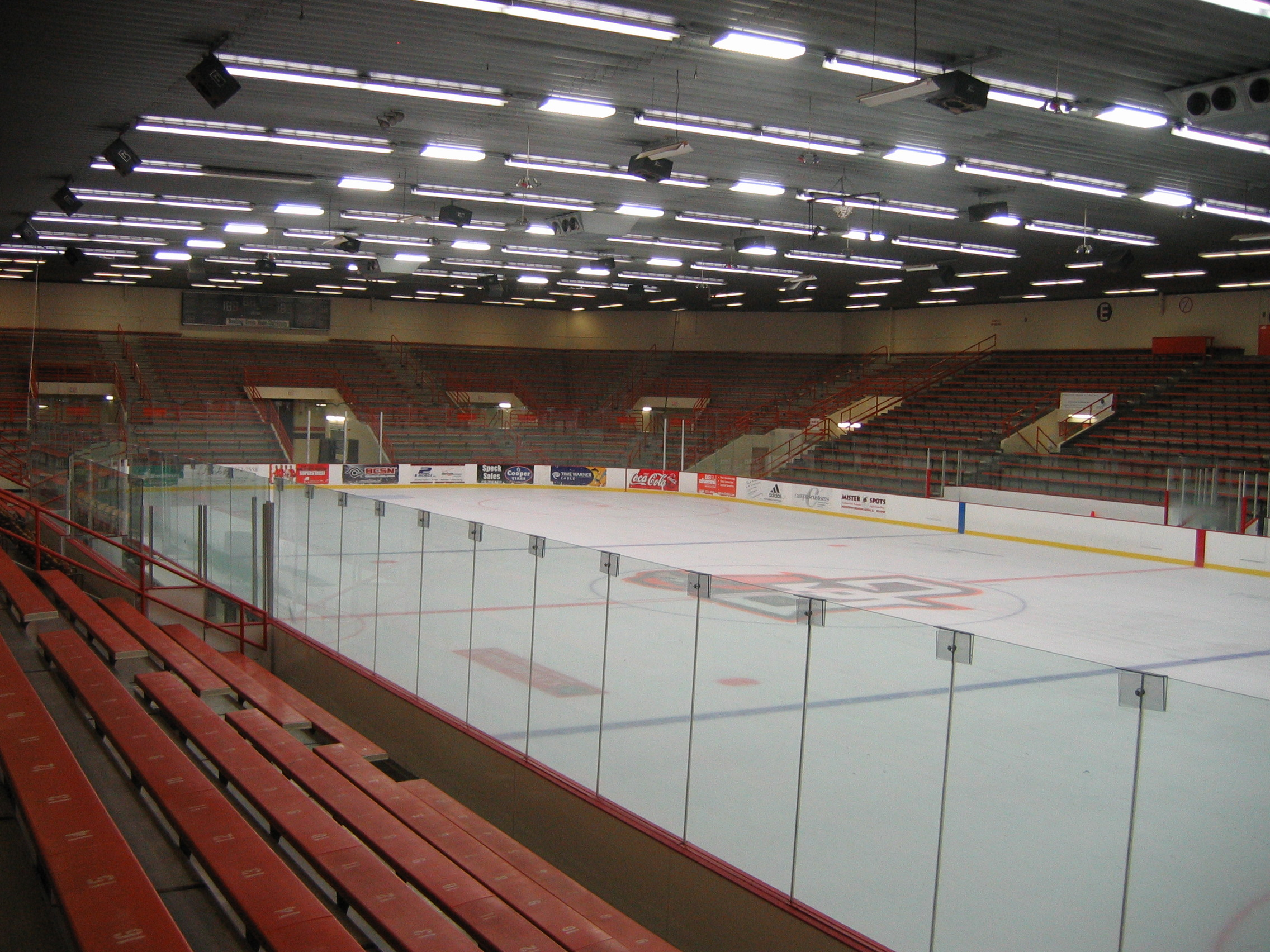
- Interactive map of Slater Family Ice Arena
- Former names: BGSU Ice Arena (1967–2016)
- Location: Bowling Green State University; Bowling Green, Ohio, United States
- Coordinates: 41°22′44″N 83°37′40″W
- Owner: Bowling Green State University
- Operator: Bowling Green State University
- Capacity: 5,000 (ice hockey)
- Surface: 200 ft × 85 ft (61 m × 26 m) (ice hockey)

Construction
- Groundbreaking: Spring, 1965
- Opened: February 25, 1967
- Cost: $1.8 million
- Architects: Buegher & Stowe, Toledo, Ohio

Tenants
- Bowling Green Falcons (NCAA) 1967–present Bowling Green Curling Club 1968–2016

The Slater Family Ice Arena is a 5,000-seat hockey arena on the campus of Bowling Green State University in Bowling Green, Ohio. It is home to the university's men's ice hockey team, the Bowling Green Falcons, which plays in the Central Collegiate Hockey Association. It was built from 1965 to 1967 for a cost of $1.8 million and opened in February 1967. The arena originally had seating for 2,863 until 1989 when it was expanded to its current size of 5,000. Formerly known as the BGSU Ice Arena, it was renamed in 2016.

== Ice hockey ==
- Bowling Green State University's NCAA Division I men's team competes in the Central Collegiate Hockey Association (CCHA). The team began in 1969 and played in the Midwest Collegiate Hockey Association for its first two seasons before joining the CCHA as a charter member for the 1971–72 season. Upon the demise of the original CCHA in 2013, the Falcons moved to the Western Collegiate Hockey Association, playing there until leaving to reestablish the CCHA in 2021.
- BGSU men's club team (ACHA Division II/GLIHA)
- BGSU women's club team (ACHA D2 and CCWHA)
- Bowling Green High School varsity and junior varsity teams
- BGSU intramural broomball, curling, and hockey
- Bowling Green Youth Hockey Association

== Figure skating ==
- BGSU Synchronized Skating Team
- Bowling Green Figure Skating Club
- Other individual skating programs and competitions

== Curling ==
The BGSU Ice Arena was home to the Bowling Green Curling Club for 48 years (1968–2016). In the spring of 2016, the club began a move to a dedicated curling facility. On October 21, 2017, the move was completed.
