= 2023–24 Michigan Tech Huskies men's ice hockey season =

Great Lakes Invitational, Champion CCHA Tournament, Champion NCAA tournament, East Regional Semifinal
- Conference: T–2nd CCHA
- Home ice: MacInnes Student Ice Arena

Rankings
- USCHO: #19
- USA Hockey: #20

Record
- Overall: 19–15–6
- Conference: 12–10–2
- Home: 11–7–3
- Road: 7–7–2
- Neutral: 1–1–1

Coaches and captains
- Head coach: Joe Shawhan
- Assistant coaches: Tyler Shelast; Jordy Murray; Alec Broetzman; Jamie Phillips
- Captain(s): Arvid Caderoth; Logan Pietila
- Alternate captain: Blake Pietila

The 2023–24 Michigan Tech Huskies men's ice hockey season was the 103rd season of play for the program and 6th in the CCHA. The Huskies represented Michigan Technological University in the 2023–24 NCAA Division I men's ice hockey season, played their home games at MacInnes Student Ice Arena and were coached by Joe Shawhan in his 7th season.

== Season ==
Due to a hazing incident, at Bowling Green, Austen Swankler left the program just before the start of the season. After entering the transfer portal, he announced that he had decided to join Michigan Tech. Due to transfer rules, Swankler would not be able to play for the Huskies until the spring semester.

Tech was adding Swankler to a club that had high expectations for itself. Their leading scorer from '23, Kyle Kukkonen, was now entering his second season and the team was backstopped by All-American Blake Pietila, who had returned for a fifth season. While there was a good deal of roster turnover, Tech was still picked to win the CCHA title in the preseason poll. The Huskies entered the year ranked in the top 10 nationally but did not get off to a good start. After tying Minnesota Duluth in the US Hockey Hall of Fame Game, Pietila had a rough couple of weeks in goal. The offense, which was still sorting itself out, got very little help from Kukkonen as he went goal-less in October. Michigan Tech didn't score more than 2 goals in any of their seven contests during the month and finished the month with a dreadful 0–4–3 record.

Adding insult to injury, Patriks Marcinkēvičs had filed a misconduct claim with the university about head coach Joe Shawhan. The Long Island transfer claimed that he had suffered mental abuse in the form of "hurtful comments" while the coach had "fostered a divisive culture". During the subsequent investigation, the school found that Shawhan had kicked Marcinkēvičs out of multiple practices since the beginning of the season. Additionally, in the Huskies' game on October 21, Marcinkēvičs had been benched for the third period after be called for an unsportsmanlike conduct penalty in the second, his second minor of the night. Two days later, Marcinkēvičs was kicked out of practice yet again and proceeded to clean out his locker of his own volition. He met with Shawhan afterwards and recorded their conversation without the coach's knowledge. While Marcinkēvičs intended to return at some future date, the school informed him that while it was conducting its investigation into the accusations, he would be unable to return to the team. After three weeks, the school announced that it had completed its review and no action would be taken. When asked for further detail, Michigan Tech said that they were unable to disclose any details of the investigation due to FERPA regulations. The only other detail that was reported was that after Marcinkēvičs had left the team, no other player had come forth with any accusations against the coach. In the interim, Marcinkēvičs had made the recording public and given an interview to TV6 to give his side of the story. Despite his initial intentions, after the review Marcinkēvičs was not allowed to return to the program and instead signed a professional contract.

At the height of the investigation, Tech finally found its offense and swept Augustana for its first wins of the season. The weekend was the coming out party for Isaac Gordon, who recorded a hat-trick in the first game, while fellow freshmen Chase Pietila and Max Koskipirtti also began to grow comfortable in their roles with the team. It took Blake Pietila a little longer to find his form but eventually the team began to play up to expectations and a very good November brought the team up to .500.

After Christmas, the Huskies battled at the Great Lakes Invitational and after a narrow victory over Alaska (its first against a non-CCHA team), Tech found themselves pitted against #7 Michigan State. Though they outclassed in the match, Blake Pietila and Jack Works combined to produce one of the best performances of the season. Tech was outshot 57–25 in the game but Pietila kept his team in the match. He kept MSU off of the scoresheet for long stretches, enabling Works to give the Huskies two separate leads in the game. After Works completed his hat-trick in the third, Pietila turned aside a withering barrage and though he was unable to keep everything out, he did get his club into overtime. The match eventually went to a shootout and Pietila stopped all three attempts by Michigan State, allowing the marker from Ryland Mosley to stand as the winning score.

While all signs pointed to Tech having overcome its poor start, the team proceeded to immediately fall on its face and get swept by St. Thomas. The team then played .500 hockey over the next four weeks as the offense began to struggle. During this month-long stretch, the defense was about the only thing holding the team together. It wasn't until late-February that the offense woke up once more and Tech finished strong to pull into a tie with St. Thomas. However, because the Tommies had the tie-breaker, Tech was given the third seed for the CCHA tournament.

The Huskies opened their postseason run against Bowling Green, however, they would do so without Swankler. When the forward hit the ice at the Great Lakes Invitational he initially looked right at home and recorded 3 assists in his first three games. Afterwards, however, he went pointless in seven while the team went through its offensive dry spell. In early November, Swankler was felled by an undisclosed injury that would cost him the rest of his season. With him unable to participate, it fell to the rest of the Huskies to get revenge in his name. Gordon's 3-point game was more than enough when Blake Pietila posted his fourth shutout of the season Tech continued to hammer the puck at the net in the rematch but a poor game from Pietila let a little drama creep in; the Falcons went 2-for-2 on the power play and twice were able to take the lead despite getting just 15 shots in the game. Tech, however, continued its offensive surge and scored 4 power play goals. A second 3-point effort from Gordon was just what the team needed to win a 1-goal game and advance to the semifinals.

Against Minnesota State, Tech needed all of the offense it could muster. Three separate times the Huskies got behind but each time they managed to tie the game. Special teams once again were key for Tech as they scored on the power play and had Logan Pietila score late in the third on a penalty shot. As the final seconds were ticking away, Tech fired a puck towards the Maverick net. While the shot looked to be going wide, the MSU netminder kicked it away. Instead of going into the corner, however, the puck deflected up behind the net and struck the glass. It rebounded back over the goal and a Minnesota State defender went to swipe it away from danger. He missed the puck which instead struck him in the helmet, then bounced back towards the goal and dropped behind the goaltender and into the cage. Logan Pietila was given credit for his second goal of the game and with just 9 seconds left on the clock, it proved to be the game-winner. In the championship game, there were fewer goals but no less drama. Bemidji State opened the scoring but, less than a minute later, Chase Pietila tied the score. Rylan Mosley's 18th of the season in the middle of the second period gave Tech the lead and from then on it was up to Blake Pietila to carry them to the finish. Their star netminder stopped 17 shots in the third, as well as a Beaver power play in the final 5 minutes, to lead the Huskies to victory and send Tech back to the NCAA tournament.

Due in no small part to their terrible non-conference record, Michigan Tech received the 16th and last seed and was set against Boston College. The Huskies played the Eagles well in the first two periods and a short-handed goal from Max Koskipirtti gave some hope that Tech might be able to pull off the upset. Down by just 1 goal entering the third, BC's vaunted offense took over and they scored three goals in quick succession. Michigan Tech had no response and the game was all but over with 10 minutes to play. The final nail in the coffin came when Mosley was given a match penalty for contact to the head and BC scored twice on the ensuing major penalty. Regardless of the sour end, Michigan Tech had battled to several obstacles to produce a successful season.

== Departures ==
Player	Position	Nationality	Cause
Tristan Ashbrook	Forward	United States	Graduation (signed with Savannah Ghost Pirates)
Jake Crespi	Defenseman	United States	Graduation (signed with Ferencvárosi TC)
Frank Dovorany	Defenseman	United States	Left program (retired)
Logan Ganie	Forward	Canada	Graduate transfer to Robert Morris
Topi Heiskanen	Defenseman	Finland	Signed professional contract (KalPa)
David Jankowski	Forward	Canada	Graduation (signed with Wheeling Nailers)
Chris Lipe	Defenseman	United States	Graduation (signed with Iowa Heartlanders)
Patriks Marcinkēvičs	Forward	Latvia	Left program mid-season (signed with Utah Grizzlies)
Nick Nardella	Forward	United States	Signed professional contract (Cincinnati Cyclones)
Ryan O'Connell	Defenseman	Canada	Graduation (signed with Toulouse-Blagnac)
Parker Saretsky	Forward	Canada	Graduation (signed with Fort Wayne Komets)
Brett Thorne	Defenseman	Canada	Left Program

== Recruiting ==
Player	Position	Nationality	Age	Notes
Henry Bartle	Forward	United States	20	Blaine, MN
Matthew Campbell	Defenseman	Canada	21	North Vancouver, BC; transfer from Quinnipiac
Lachlan Getz	Defenseman	United States	21	Northfield, IL; transfer from Boston University
Isaac Gordon	Forward	Canada	19	Landmark, MB
Max Koskipirtti	Forward	Finland	19	Espoo, FIN
Patriks Marcinkēvičs	Forward	Latvia	22	Riga, LAT; transfer from Long Island
Cameron Moger	Defenseman	Canada	21	Vernon, BC
Chase Pietila	Defenseman	United States	19	Howell, MI
Lauri Raiman	Forward	Finland	19	Vantaa, FIN
Nick Williams	Defenseman	Finland	21	Edina, MN

== Roster ==
As of September 18, 2023.

No.	Nat.	Player	Class	Pos	Height	Weight	DoB	Hometown	Previous team	NHL rights
2	(Canada)	Cameron Moger	Freshman	D	6' 2" (1.88 m)	177 lb (80 kg)	2002-04-22	Vernon, British Columbia	Coquitlam (BCHL)	—
4	(United States)	Henry Bartle	Freshman	F	6' 2" (1.88 m)	185 lb (84 kg)	2003-06-03	Blaine, Minnesota	Des Moines (USHL)	—
5	(Australia)	Tyrone Bronte	Senior	F	5' 10" (1.78 m)	175 lb (79 kg)	1999-05-07	Melbourne, Australia	Alabama–Huntsville (WCHA)	—
6	(Finland)	Lauri Raiman	Freshman	F	5' 11" (1.8 m)	181 lb (82 kg)	2004-01-27	Vantaa, Finland	Pelicans U20 (U20 SM-sarja)	—
7	(Finland)	Kasper Vähärautio	Sophomore	D	6' 0" (1.83 m)	187 lb (85 kg)	2002-10-02	Helsinki, Finland	Jokerit U20 (U20 SM-sarja)	—
8	(United States)	Trevor Russell	Junior	D	6' 2" (1.88 m)	197 lb (89 kg)	2000-02-02	Old Hickory, Tennessee	Aberdeen (NAHL)	—
9	(United States)	Kyle Kukkonen	Sophomore	F	5' 10" (1.78 m)	172 lb (78 kg)	2002-11-13	Maple Grove, Minnesota	Madison (USHL)	ANA, 162nd overall 2021
10	(United States)	Lachlan Getz	Sophomore	D	6' 3" (1.91 m)	190 lb (86 kg)	2002-02-01	Northfield, Illinois	Boston University (HEA)	—
11	(Canada)	Ryland Mosley	Senior	F	5' 11" (1.8 m)	185 lb (84 kg)	2000-02-15	Arnprior, Ontario	Carleton Place (CCHL)	—
12	(Canada)	Kash Rasmussen	Sophomore	F	6' 2" (1.88 m)	170 lb (77 kg)	2001-04-20	Cochrane, Alberta	Bonnyville (AJHL)	—
13	(United States)	Logan Pietila (C)	Graduate	F	5' 11" (1.8 m)	175 lb (79 kg)	2000-01-27	Howell, Michigan	Dubuque (USHL)	—
14	(Finland)	Max Koskipirtti	Freshman	F	6' 0" (1.83 m)	180 lb (82 kg)	2004-08-16	Espoo, Finland	Kiekko-Espoo U20 (U20 SM-sarja)	—
15	(Canada)	Matthew Campbell	Sophomore	D	6' 1" (1.85 m)	165 lb (75 kg)	2003-03-04	North Vancouver, British Columbia	Quinnipiac (ECAC)	—
16	(Canada)	Isaac Gordon	Freshman	F	5' 11" (1.8 m)	190 lb (86 kg)	2004-01-29	Landmark, Manitoba	Sioux Falls (USHL)	—
17	(United States)	Chase Pietila	Freshman	D	6' 3" (1.91 m)	188 lb (85 kg)	2004-03-03	Howell, Michigan	Youngstown (USHL)	—
18	(United States)	Alex Nordstrom	Junior	F	5' 11" (1.8 m)	165 lb (75 kg)	2000-11-15	Atlantic Mine, Michigan	Green Bay (USHL)	—
19	(United States)	Nick Williams	Freshman	D	5' 10" (1.78 m)	177 lb (80 kg)	2002-09-21	Edina, Minnesota	Youngstown (USHL)	—
20	(Sweden)	Arvid Caderoth (C)	Senior	F	6' 5" (1.96 m)	220 lb (100 kg)	2000-05-14	Gothenburg, Sweden	Frölunda J20 (J20 SuperElit)	—
21	(United States)	Blais Richartz	Senior	F	6' 0" (1.83 m)	185 lb (84 kg)	2000-06-23	Menomonie, Wisconsin	Lincoln (USHL)	—
22	(Sweden)	Marcus Pedersen	Junior	F	6' 3" (1.91 m)	187 lb (85 kg)	2001-05-25	Stockholm, Sweden	Malmö J20 (J20 Nationell)	—
23	(United States)	Trevor Kukkonen	Sophomore	F	5' 11" (1.8 m)	181 lb (82 kg)	2001-02-01	Maple Grove, Minnesota	Minnesota Magicians (NAHL)	—
24	(United States)	Oliver Bezick	Sophomore	D	6' 0" (1.83 m)	190 lb (86 kg)	2001-06-12	Delray Beach, Florida	Amarillo (NAHL)	—
25	(United States)	Jed Pietila	Senior	D	5' 11" (1.8 m)	185 lb (84 kg)	1999-01-13	Howell, Michigan	Austin (NAHL)	—
26	(United States)	Evan Orr	Sophomore	D	5' 11" (1.8 m)	185 lb (84 kg)	2001-01-09	Shelby Township, Michigan	Northeast (NAHL)	—
27	(Latvia)	Patriks Marcinkēvičs	Sophomore	F	5' 9" (1.75 m)	168 lb (76 kg)	2001-05-06	Riga, Latvia	Long Island (NCAA)	—
27	(United States)	Austen Swankler	Junior	F	6' 0" (1.83 m)	185 lb (84 kg)	2001-08-21	North Huntingdon, Pennsylvania	Bowling Green (CCHA)	—
28	(United States)	Levi Stauber	Junior	F	5' 11" (1.8 m)	175 lb (79 kg)	2000-01-16	Hermantown, Minnesota	Danbury (NAHL)	—
29	(Canada)	Jack Works	Junior (RS)	F	6' 0" (1.83 m)	185 lb (84 kg)	2001-05-23	Yellowknife, Northwest Territories	Denver (NCHC)	—
30	(Finland)	Max Väyrynen	Sophomore	G	6' 2" (1.88 m)	183 lb (83 kg)	2002-06-18	Espoo, Finland	Ässät U20 (U20 SM-sarja)	—
31	(United States)	Blake Pietila (A)	Graduate	G	5' 11" (1.8 m)	170 lb (77 kg)	2000-01-27	Howell, Michigan	Cedar Rapids (USHL)	—
35	(United States)	Michael Morelli	Sophomore	G	6' 0" (1.83 m)	154 lb (70 kg)	2001-04-25	Arvada, Colorado	Maryland (NAHL)	—

== Standings ==
2023–24 Central Collegiate Hockey Association Standings
	Conference record										Overall record					
	GP	W	L	T	OTW	OTL	SW	PTS	GF	GA	GP	W	L	T	GF	GA
Bemidji State †	24	15	7	2	2	1	2	48	82	64	38	20	16	2	117	111
St. Thomas	24	12	11	1	0	2	0	39	68	62	37	15	20	2	97	105
#19 Michigan Tech*	24	12	10	2	1	2	0	39	63	54	40	19	15	6	109	102
Minnesota State	24	12	10	2	2	1	1	38	73	62	37	18	15	4	111	96
Northern Michigan	24	10	10	4	1	1	2	36	57	67	34	12	16	6	83	105
Bowling Green	24	11	12	1	1	1	1	35	60	69	36	13	22	1	86	116
Lake Superior State	24	11	12	1	2	2	0	34	79	73	38	17	20	1	114	113
Ferris State	24	6	17	1	3	2	1	19	49	80	36	10	24	2	83	125
Augustana ^	0	0	0	0	0	0	0	0	0	0	34	12	18	4	90	105
Championship: March 22, 2024 † indicates conference regular season champion (MacNaughton Cup) * indicates conference tournament champion (Mason Cup)^ Augustana is playing a transition schedule of 16 games against conference opponents that are not counted in the standings Rankings: USCHO.com Top 20 Poll

== Schedule and results ==
Date	Time	Opponent^{#}	Rank^{#}	Site	TV	Decision	Result	Attendance	Record
Regular Season
October 7	8:07 pm	at #17 Minnesota Duluth*	#10	AMSOIL Arena • Duluth, Minnesota (US Hockey Hall of Fame Game)		Pietila	T 2–2 ^{OT}	6,017	0–0–1
October 13	7:07 pm	Alaska*	#9	MacInnes Student Ice Arena • Houghton, Michigan	FloHockey	Pietila	L 1–4	3,454	0–1–1
October 14	6:07 pm	Alaska*	#9	MacInnes Student Ice Arena • Houghton, Michigan	FloHockey	Pietila	T 2–2 ^{OT}	3,454	0–1–2
October 20	7:07 pm	Wisconsin*	#17	MacInnes Student Ice Arena • Houghton, Michigan	FloHockey	Pietila	L 2–4	3,394	0–2–2
October 21	6:07 pm	Wisconsin*	#17	MacInnes Student Ice Arena • Houghton, Michigan	FloHockey	Pietila	L 2–5	3,394	0–3–2
October 27	7:00 pm	at St. Lawrence*		Appleton Arena • Canton, New York	ESPN+	Pietila	T 2–2 ^{OT}	1,073	0–3–3
October 28	7:00 pm	at Clarkson*		Cheel Arena • Potsdam, New York	ESPN+	Väyrynen	L 1–3	2,962	0–4–3
November 3	7:07 pm	Augustana*		MacInnes Student Ice Arena • Houghton, Michigan	FloHockey	Pietila	W 6–4	2,527	1–4–3
November 4	6:07 pm	Augustana*		MacInnes Student Ice Arena • Houghton, Michigan	FloHockey	Väyrynen	W 4–3 ^{OT}	3,021	2–4–3
November 10	8:07 pm	at Bemidji State		Sanford Center • Bemidji, Minnesota	FloHockey	Pietila	W 4–2	1,632	3–4–3 (1–0–0)
November 11	7:07 pm	at Bemidji State		Sanford Center • Bemidji, Minnesota	FloHockey	Pietila	L 4–6	1,740	3–5–3 (1–1–0)
November 17	7:07 pm	Ferris State		MacInnes Student Ice Arena • Houghton, Michigan	FloHockey	Väyrynen	L 2–3 ^{OT}	2,379	3–6–3 (1–2–0)
November 18	6:07 pm	Ferris State		MacInnes Student Ice Arena • Houghton, Michigan	FloHockey	Pietila	W 3–2	2,279	4–6–3 (2–2–0)
November 24	8:07 pm	at Minnesota State		Mayo Clinic Health System Event Center • Mankato, Minnesota	FloHockey	Pietila	W 3–2 ^{OT}	3,732	5–6–3 (3–2–0)
November 25	7:07 pm	at Minnesota State		Mayo Clinic Health System Event Center • Mankato, Minnesota	FloHockey	Pietila	W 3–2	4,023	6–6–3 (4–2–0)
December 1	7:07 pm	Bowling Green		MacInnes Student Ice Arena • Houghton, Michigan	FloHockey	Pietila	L 1–2 ^{OT}	2,974	6–7–3 (4–3–0)
December 2	6:07 pm	Bowling Green		MacInnes Student Ice Arena • Houghton, Michigan	FloHockey	Pietila	W 3–2	2,759	7–7–3 (5–3–0)
December 8	7:07 pm	Northern Michigan		MacInnes Student Ice Arena • Houghton, Michigan (Rivalry)	FloHockey	Pietila	W 4–2	3,649	8–7–3 (6–3–0)
December 9	6:07 pm	at Northern Michigan		Berry Events Center • Marquette, Michigan (Rivalry)	FloHockey	Pietila	L 1–3	—	8–8–3 (6–4–0)
Great Lakes Invitational
December 28	3:30 pm	vs. Alaska*		Van Andel Arena • Grand Rapids, Michigan (Great Lakes Invitational Semifinal)	FloHockey	Pietila	W 3–2 ^{OT}	6,880	9–8–3
December 29	7:00 pm	vs. #7 Michigan State*		Van Andel Arena • Grand Rapids, Michigan (Great Lakes Invitational Championship)	FloHockey	Pietila	T 3–3 ^{SOW}	6,958	9–8–4
January 6	6:07 pm	at Northern Michigan*		Berry Events Center • Marquette, Michigan (Rivalry, Exhibition)	FloHockey	Väyrynen	L 2–7	3,911	
January 11	8:07 pm	at St. Thomas		St. Thomas Ice Arena • Mendota Heights, Minnesota	FloHockey	Pietila	L 3–4	1,021	9–9–4 (6–5–0)
January 13	6:07 pm	at St. Thomas		St. Thomas Ice Arena • Mendota Heights, Minnesota	FloHockey	Pietila	L 1–3	1,059	9–10–4 (6–6–0)
January 19	7:07 pm	Bemidji State		MacInnes Student Ice Arena • Houghton, Michigan	FloHockey	Pietila	W 2–1	2,864	10–10–4 (7–6–0)
January 20	6:07 pm	Bemidji State		MacInnes Student Ice Arena • Houghton, Michigan	FloHockey	Pietila	T 2–2 ^{SOL}	2,769	10–10–5 (7–6–1)
January 26	7:07 pm	at Lake Superior State		Taffy Abel Arena • Sault Ste. Marie, Michigan	FloHockey	Pietila	L 1–3	1,126	10–11–5 (7–7–1)
January 27	6:07 pm	at Lake Superior State		Taffy Abel Arena • Sault Ste. Marie, Michigan	FloHockey	Pietila	W 1–0	1,602	11–11–5 (8–7–1)
February 2	7:07 pm	at Northern Michigan		Berry Events Center • Marquette, Michigan (Rivalry)	FloHockey	Pietila	L 1–4	4,260	11–12–5 (8–8–1)
February 3	6:07 pm	Northern Michigan		MacInnes Student Ice Arena • Houghton, Michigan (Rivalry)	FloHockey	Pietila	T 3–3 ^{SOL}	3,730	11–12–6 (8–8–2)
February 9	7:07 pm	Minnesota State		MacInnes Student Ice Arena • Houghton, Michigan (Winter Carnival)	FloHockey	Pietila	W 3–1	3,704	12–12–6 (9–8–2)
February 10	5:07 pm	Minnesota State		MacInnes Student Ice Arena • Houghton, Michigan (Winter Carnival)	FloHockey	Pietila	L 2–4	3,773	12–13–6 (9–9–2)
February 23	7:07 pm	at Bowling Green		Slater Family Ice Arena • Bowling Green, Ohio	FloHockey	Pietila	W 7–0	2,664	13–13–6 (10–9–2)
February 24	7:07 pm	at Bowling Green		Slater Family Ice Arena • Bowling Green, Ohio	FloHockey	Pietila	W 3–1	4,184	14–13–6 (11–9–2)
March 1	7:07 pm	St. Thomas		MacInnes Student Ice Arena • Houghton, Michigan	FloHockey	Pietila	L 0–2	2,371	14–14–6 (11–10–2)
March 2	6:07 pm	St. Thomas		MacInnes Student Ice Arena • Houghton, Michigan	FloHockey	Pietila	W 6–0	2,851	15–14–6 (12–10–2)
CCHA Tournament
March 8	7:07 pm	Bowling Green*		MacInnes Student Ice Arena • Houghton, Michigan (Quarterfinal Game 1)	FloHockey	Pietila	W 5–0	2,718	16–14–6
March 9	6:07 pm	Bowling Green*		MacInnes Student Ice Arena • Houghton, Michigan (Quarterfinal Game 2)	FloHockey	Pietila	W 6–5	2,889	17–14–6
March 16	5:07 pm	Minnesota State*		MacInnes Student Ice Arena • Houghton, Michigan (Semifinal)	FloHockey	Pietila	W 4–3	3,527	18–14–6
March 22	8:07 pm	at #20 Bemidji State*		Sanford Center • Bemidji, Minnesota (Championship)	FloHockey	Pietila	W 2–1	4,373	19–14–6
NCAA Tournament
March 29	2:00 pm	vs. #1 Boston College*	#20	Amica Mutual Pavilion • Providence, Rhode Island (East Regional Semifinal)	ESPNU	Pietila	L 1–6	6,988	19–15–6
*Non-conference game. ^{#}Rankings from USCHO.com Poll. All times are in Eastern Time. Source:

== NCAA tournament ==
=== East Regional semifinal ===
March 29, 2024; 2:00 pm	(1) Boston College	6–1 (1–1, 1–0, 4–0)	(4) Michigan Tech	Amica Mutual Pavilion; Attendance: 6,988

Game reference

Jacob Fowler
Goalies
Blake Pietila
Referees:
Ryan Hersey
Nathan Wieler
Linesmen:
Tyler Liffrig
Erik Contino

(Jellvik, Powell) Cutter Gauthier (36) – 0:36	1–0
	1–1	12:55 – SH – Max Koskipirtti (4) (unassisted)
(Malone, Hreschuk) Ryan Leonard (28) – GW – 26:57	2–1
(Malone, Powell) Connor Joyce (12) – 44:47	3–1
(Smith, Leonard) Oskar Jellvik (13) – 45:35	4–1
(Gauthier, Powell) Ryan Leonard (29) – PP – 47:58	5–1
(Jellvik, Leonard) Cutter Gauthier (37) – PP – 51:25	6–1

21 min
Penalties
31 min
38
Shots
24

Game summary
The game began with the teams exchanging rushes up the ice. After Tech lost control of the puck in front of the Eagle's net, Oskar Jellvik skated up the ice and passed the puck to Cutter Gauthier, who had gotten behind the Huskies defense on a partial break away. The nation's leading goal scorer fired the puck between Blake Pietila's legs for the opening goal. BC kept the pressure on and got several more scoring chances afterwards but Pietila had settled down and kept Tech in the game. The Huskies weren't able to establish any extended zone time until about the 8-minute mark but even then BC's speed kept Tech to the outside. About a minute later, a BC turnover in their own end resulted in two glorious scoring chances for Tech but the pipe helped to keep the puck out of the goal. As Tech started warming to the task, they got another chance after the Eagles iced the puck; MTU won the ensuing faceoff and crashed in on Jacob Fowler. The puck ended up getting past the BC goalie but bounced just to the side of the cage. Michigan Tech continued to circle and got another scoring chance a few second later but the Jack Malone blocked the shot. A further chance went wide and the puck ended up coming to Colby Ambrosio who charged down the ice on a break away. Chase Pietila managed to just catch him from behind and hook Ambrosio as he was shooting to eliminate the scoring chance. Rather than awarding Ambrosio a penalty shot, the referees handed Pietila a minor penalty. half-way through the kill, BC turned over the puck at center ice and Tech broke towards Fowler on a 2-on-0. Max Koskipirtti kept the puck and, right when he got to the faceoff dot, he fired a shot right over Fowler's glove for Tech's second short-handed goal on the season. The Huskies captured the momentum afterwards and began generating scoring opportunities in the BC zone. Now it was Fowler's turn to hold the fort and the young netminder matched Pietila save-for-save. Towards the end of the period BC regained its footing and play evened out the score remained tied at the buzzer.

Both teams picked up in the second right where they left off and got on the attack. BC turned the puck over several times in the first two minutes, giving Tech multiple scoring chances. The best went to Kash Rasmussen who found himself completely alone in front of the BC net but his shot went wide. A few seconds later, a loose puck bounced right to Koskipirtti for shot from the slot but Fowler got in the way. Eventually, the Eagles began to calm down and get into the offensive zone around the 5th minute. Jellvik got a solid scoring chance but his shot was deflected off the post by Blake Pietila. The Eagles continued to press and Ryan Leonard rushed the puck up the ice. Pietila stopped his initial shot, as well as the rebound from Aidan Hreschuk. Jack Malone found the loose puck and shuffled it over to an open Leonard who fired into a half-open cage for BC's second lead of the night. Play tilted towards Boston College afterwards but the Eagles continued to make sloppy plays and turn the puck over in dangerous areas. Tech got a few good looks at the net but the puck refused to cooperate and several chanced went by the wayside. Right off of a faceoff, Leonard broke in on Pietila and nearly tucked the puck into the goal but the Tech defense was able to turn him aside without taking a penalty. Scant second later, Gabe Perreault hit Tyrone Bronte in the head and received a match penalty. Boston College needed their #1 penalty kill to come through and it did. Michigan Tech got a few chances on Fowler, much of their time was spent trying to set up in the offensive zone and the Huskies were unable to convert on the man-advantage. BC was able to carry their narrow lead to the end of the period but they would have to finish the game missing one of their top scorers.

Michigan Tech started the third by joining BC in bad habits and committed two bad turnovers that led to chances for the Eagles. Pietila managed to keep the puck out of the net and the disjointed play continued for both sides. Eventually, BC was able to set up in the offensive zone and Connor Joyce got lost behind the net. When he popped out in front, Jack Malone found him for an easy tap in goal. Less than a minute later, BC cleared the puck into the Tech end. When Blake Pietila went behind the goal to gain possession, the rubber hit the referee in the backside and deflected into the net. However, the rule (83.6) stipulated that a goal cannot be scored due to direct interference from the officials so the goal was waved off. The reprieve for Tech didn't last long and just a minute later Will Smith got the puck to Jellvik on a break away and he put BC up by three. After the succeeding faceoff, Ryland Mosley took a run at Ryan Leonard at center ice and a melee broke out. Mosley received a match penalty while all other infractions cancelled out. A minute into the power play, Ryan Leonard netted his second goal off of a rush and the route was on. Gauthier ended the power play with his second of the game after a drop-pass in the slot from Jellvik. BC continued to press afterwards, looking for another goal, but the intensity was muted. Both teams played like they knew the game was over and soon enough it was.

== Scoring statistics ==
Name	Position	Games	Goals	Assists	Points	PIM
Isaac Gordon	F	40	18	18	36	4
Ryland Mosley	LW	40	18	15	33	10
Logan Pietila	RW	40	13	16	29	4
Chase Pietila	D	40	3	19	22	60
Max Koskipirtti	C/W	33	4	17	21	10
Jack Works	F	35	10	10	20	17
Tyrone Bronte	C	35	6	8	14	26
Jed Pietila	D	40	2	12	14	26
Arvid Caderoth	C/RW	35	7	6	13	14
Kash Rasmussen	F	35	3	9	12	9
Kyle Kukkonen	C	27	1	11	12	18
Matthew Campbell	D	30	4	7	11	8
Marcus Pedersen	LW/RW	37	5	4	9	2
Alex Nordstrom	F	26	4	4	8	6
Blais Richartz	F	31	3	4	7	8
Trevor Russell	D	38	0	7	7	30
Henry Bartle	F	16	1	4	5	19
Nick Williams	D	25	1	4	5	8
Lauri Raiman	C/W	32	2	2	4	4
Lachlan Getz	D	28	1	2	3	8
Austen Swankler	C	10	0	3	3	10
Patriks Marcinkēvičs	LW	5	1	1	2	4
Evan Orr	D	14	1	1	2	2
Levi Stauber	F	20	1	1	2	4
Kasper Vähärautio	D	37	0	2	2	12
Blake Pietila	G	37	0	1	1	0
Michael Morelli	G	1	0	0	0	0
Oliver Bezick	D	1	0	0	0	0
Trevor Kukkonen	F	2	0	0	0	2
Max Väyrynen	G	4	0	0	0	0
Total			109	188	297	326

== Goaltending statistics ==
Name	Games	Minutes	Wins	Losses	Ties	Goals against	Saves	Shut outs	SV %	GAA
Blake Pietila	37	2215:45	18	13	6	88	973	4	.917	2.38
Max Väyrynen	5	199:43	1	2	0	8	70	0	.897	2.40
Empty Net	-	23:49	-	-	-	7	-	-	-	-
Total	40	2439:17	19	15	6	103	1044	4	.910	2.53

== Rankings ==
Poll	Week																										
Poll	Pre	1	2	3	4	5	6	7	8	9	10	11	12	13	14	15	16	17	18	19	20	21	22	23	24	25	26 (Final)
USCHO.com	10	9	17	NR	NR	NR	NR	NR	NR	NR	NR	–	NR	NR	NR	NR	NR	NR	NR	NR	NR	NR	NR	NR	20	–	19
USA Hockey	11	10	17	NR	NR	NR	NR	NR	NR	NR	NR	NR	–	NR	NR	NR	NR	NR	NR	NR	NR	NR	NR	NR	20	20	20

Note: USCHO did not release a poll in weeks 11 and 25.
Note: USA Hockey did not release a poll in week 12.

== Awards and honors ==
Player	Award	Ref
Isaac Gordon	CCHA Rookie of the Year	
Blake Pietila	CCHA Second Team	
Isaac Gordon	CCHA Second Team	
Isaac Gordon	CCHA Rookie Team	

== 2024 NHL entry draft ==
Round	Pick	Player	NHL team
4	111	Chase Pietila	Pittsburgh Penguins

† incoming freshman
