= 2024 CCHA men's ice hockey tournament =

- Dates: March 8–22, 2024
- Teams: 8
- Finals site: Sanford Center; Bemidji, Minnesota
- Champions: Michigan Tech (1st title)
- Winning coach: Joe Shawhan (1st title)
- CCHA men's Ice Hockey Tournaments

The 2024 CCHA Men's Ice Hockey Tournament was the 45th tournament in the history of the men's Central Collegiate Hockey Association. It began on March 8 and ended on March 22, 2024. All games were played at home campus sites. Michigan Tech won the tournament and received the CCHA's automatic bid for the 2024 NCAA Division I Men's Ice Hockey Tournament.

== Format ==
The first round of the postseason tournament features a best-of-three games format, while the semifinals and final are single games held at the campus sites of the highest remaining seeds. All eight conference teams participated in the tournament. Teams are seeded No. 1 through No. 8 according to their final conference standings, with a tiebreaker system used to seed teams with an identical number of points accumulated. The higher-seeded teams each earned home ice and hosted one of the lower-seeded teams. The teams that advance out of the quarterfinals are reseeded according to the regular season standings. The semifinals and final are single-elimination games. The winners of the semifinals play one another to determine the conference tournament champion.

== Conference standings ==
2023–24 Central Collegiate Hockey Association Standings
	Conference record										Overall record					
	GP	W	L	T	OTW	OTL	SW	PTS	GF	GA	GP	W	L	T	GF	GA
Bemidji State †	24	15	7	2	2	1	2	48	82	64	38	20	16	2	117	111
St. Thomas	24	12	11	1	0	2	0	39	68	62	37	15	20	2	97	105
#19 Michigan Tech*	24	12	10	2	1	2	0	39	63	54	40	19	15	6	109	102
Minnesota State	24	12	10	2	2	1	1	38	73	62	37	18	15	4	111	96
Northern Michigan	24	10	10	4	1	1	2	36	57	67	34	12	16	6	83	105
Bowling Green	24	11	12	1	1	1	1	35	60	69	36	13	22	1	86	116
Lake Superior State	24	11	12	1	2	2	0	34	79	73	38	17	20	1	114	113
Ferris State	24	6	17	1	3	2	1	19	49	80	36	10	24	2	83	125
Augustana ^	0	0	0	0	0	0	0	0	0	0	34	12	18	4	90	105
Championship: March 22, 2024 † indicates conference regular season champion (MacNaughton Cup) * indicates conference tournament champion (Mason Cup)^ Augustana is playing a transition schedule of 16 games against conference opponents that are not counted in the standings Rankings: USCHO.com Top 20 Poll

== Bracket ==
Teams are reseeded for the semifinals

Quarterfinals; March 8–10
1	Bemidji State	5*	4	-
8	Ferris State	4	0	-
2	St. Thomas	1	4	2
7	Lake Superior State	4	2	3
3	Michigan Tech	5	6	-
6	Bowling Green	0	5	-
4	Minnesota State	2	6	-
5	Northern Michigan	1	1	-

Semifinals; March 16
1	Bemidji State	4
7	Lake Superior State	1
3	Michigan Tech	4
4	Minnesota State	3

Championship; March 22
1	Bemidji State	1
3	Michigan Tech	2

Note: * denotes overtime period(s)

== Results ==
Note: All game times are local.

=== Quarterfinals ===
==== (1) Bemidji State vs. (8) Ferris State ====
March 8, 2024; 7:07 pm	Bemidji State	5–4 (OT) (1–2, 2–2, 1–0, 1–0)	Ferris State	Sanford Center; Attendance: 1,725

Game reference

Mattias Sholl
Goalies
Noah Giesbrecht
Referees:
Brady Johnson
Robert Lukkason
Linesmen:
Tyler Landman
Nathan Voll

	0–1	8:58 – PP – Austin McCarthy (2) (Ergang, Hale)
	0–2	9:56 – Austin McCarthy (3) (Nardecchia, Taulien)
(Roed, Wolfe) Eric Martin (7) – 11:30	1–2
(Vaisanen, Pohlkamp) Donte Lawson (4) – 26:04	2–2
	2–3	28:32 – Emerson Goode (2) (Ergang, Hale)
	2–4	35:14 – Andrew Noel (1) (Pokorny, Taulien)
(Flammang, Jones) Kasper Magnussen (6) – PP – 39:04	3–4
(Looft, Pohlkamp) Eric Martin (8) – EA – 59:21	4–4
(Looft, Jouppi) Eric Pohlkamp (8) – GW – 60:37	5–4

2 min
Penalties
8 min
51
Shots
27

March 9, 2024; 6:07 pm	Bemidji State	4–0 (0–0, 3–0, 1–0)	Ferris State	Sanford Center; Attendance: 2,176

Game reference

Mattias Sholl
Goalies
Logan Stein
Referees:
Brady Johnson
Robert Lukkason
Linesmen:
Tyler Landman
Nathan Voll

(Flammang, Vaisanen) Carter Jones (6) – GW – 23:50	1–0
(Looft, Jutting) Eric Pohlkamp (9) – PP – 35:24	2–0
(Looft, Roed) Eric Pohlkamp (10) – PP – 39:09	3–0
(Lawson, Magnuson) Jake McLean (5) – 43:35	4–0

2 min
Penalties
4 min
39
Shots
25

Bemidji State wins series 2–0

==== (2) St. Thomas vs. (7) Lake Superior State ====
March 8, 2024; 7:07 pm	St. Thomas	1–4 (1–1, 0–1, 0–2)	Lake Superior State	St. Thomas Ice Arena; Attendance: 506

Game reference

Aaron Trotter
Goalies
Ethan Langenegger
Referees:
Stephen McInchak
Bruce Vida
Linesmen:
Kyle Domin
Patrick Giles

	0–1	16:19 – Connor Milburn (14) (Kungle)
(Piechowski, Laylin) Matthew Gleason (5) – 19:55	1–1
	1–2	33:38 – GW – Jared Westcott (18) (C. Milburn)
	1–3	56:18 – Timo Bakos (8) (Herrington, Roy)
	1–4	56:45 – EN – Artyom Borshyov (2) (unassisted)

6 min
Penalties
4 min
22
Shots
28

March 9, 2024; 6:07 pm	St. Thomas	4–2 (2–0, 2–1, 0–1)	Lake Superior State	St. Thomas Ice Arena; Attendance: 495

Game reference

Aaron Trotter
Goalies
Ethan Langenegger out 40:00
Easton Hesse in 40:00
Referees:
Stephen McInchak
Bruce Vida
Linesmen:
Kyle Domin
Patrick Giles

(Wahlin, Gleason) Liam Malmquist (10) – 05:46	1–0
(Malmquist, Poolman) Lucas Wahlin (12) – 11:09	2–0
(unassisted) Jase Sofo (1) – GW – 23:12	3–0
	3–1	32:18 – Timo Bakos (9) (Blanchett, Roy)
(Wahlin, Laylin) Noah Prokop (3) – 35:00	4–1
	4–2	53:02 – EA – Connor Milburn (15) (Schweitzer, Piku)

16 min
Penalties
25 min
35
Shots
31

March 10, 2024; 5:07 pm	St. Thomas	2–3 (1–0, 1–1, 0–2)	Lake Superior State	St. Thomas Ice Arena; Attendance: 437

Game reference

Aaron Trotter
Goalies
Ethan Langenegger
Referees:
Stephen McInchak
Bruce Vida
Linesmen:
Kyle Domin
Patrick Giles

(O'Neill, Gauer) Luc Laylin (9) – 13:34	1–0
	1–1	25:10 – Connor Milburn (16) (Tritt)
(Poolman, Malmquist) Chase Cheslock (1) – PP – 36:16	2–1
	2–2	50:23 – Reagan Milburn (2) (Hindman)
	2–3	59:54 – GW – Dawson Tritt (13) (Levandowski, C. Milburn)

6 min
Penalties
23 min
30
Shots
31

Lake Superior State wins series 2–1

==== (3) Michigan Tech vs. (6) Bowling Green ====
March 8, 2024; 7:07 pm	Michigan Tech	5–0 (1–0, 2–0, 2–0)	Bowling Green	MacInnes Student Ice Arena; Attendance: 2,718

Game reference

Blake Pietila
Goalies
Cole Moore
Referees:
Nicholas Kresbach
Sterling Egan
Linesmen:
Eric Froberg
Jamie Grace

(Gordon, Mosley) Logan Pietila (3) – GW – 11:44	1–0
(L. Pietila, Russell) Isaac Gordon (17) – 30:14	2–0
(Richartz, Nordstrom) Henry Bartle (1) – 33:09	3–0
(Gordon, L. Pietila) Ryland Mosley (15) – 40:54	4–0
(Koskipirtti, Works) Arvid Caderoth (7) – 43:57	5–0

6 min
Penalties
6 min
44
Shots
21

March 9, 2024; 6:07 pm	Michigan Tech	6–5 (1–2, 4–2, 1–1)	Bowling Green	MacInnes Student Ice Arena; Attendance: 2,889

Game reference

Blake Pietila
Goalies
Christian Stoever
Referees:
Nicholas Kresbach
Sterling Egan
Linesmen:
Eric Froberg
Jamie Grace

	0–1	3:38 – Ethan Scardina (6) (Santa Juana, Waters)
	0–2	7:26 – PP – Spencer Kersten (9) (Scardina, Pfoh)
(Williams, C. Pietila) Blais Richartz (3) – 13:36	1–2
(Bronte, L. Pietila) Isaac Gordon (18) – PP – 20:32	2–2
(Koskipirtti, Caderoth) Ryland Mosley (16) – 20:40	3–2
	3–3	28:49 – Brett Pfoh (8) (Grant, Pasanen)
	3–4	30:53 – PP – Ben Doran (3) (Bevilacqua, Parker)
(L. Pietila, Gordon) Tyrone Bronte (6) – PP – 37:39	4–4
(Gordon, Campbell) Jack Works (9) – PP – 38:40	5–4
	5–5	42:00 – Brett Pfoh (14) (Grant)
(C. Pietila, Williams) Ryland Mosley (6) – GW PP – 58:57	6–5

4 min
Penalties
12 min
40
Shots
15

Michigan Tech wins series 2–0

==== (4) Minnesota State vs. (5) Northern Michigan ====
March 8, 2024; 7:07 pm	Minnesota State	2–1 (1–0, 1–0, 0–1)	Northern Michigan	Mayo Clinic Health System Event Center; Attendance: 3,084

Game reference

Alex Tracy
Goalies
Béni Halász
Referees:
Derek Berkebile
Rick Nelson
Linesmen:
Andrew Dokken
Nicholas Bradshaw

(unassisted) Jordan Power (1) – 17:20	1–0
(Morton, Koch) Lucas Sowder (12) – GW PP – 36:59	2–0
	2–1	44:17 – Rylan Van Unen (14) (Perbix, M. Van Unen)

2 min
Penalties
4 min
21
Shots
33

March 9, 2024; 6:07 pm	Minnesota State	6–1 (1–1, 2–0, 3–0)	Northern Michigan	Mayo Clinic Health System Event Center; Attendance: 3,494

Game reference

Alex Tracy
Goalies
Béni Halász
Referees:
Derek Berkebile
Rick Nelson
Linesmen:
Andrew Dokken
Nicholas Bradshaw

	0–1	4:08 – SH – Andre Ghantous (9) (unassisted)
(unassisted) Brian Carrabes (9) – 12:15	1–1
(Murr, Koch) Sam Morton (23) – GW – 27:01	2–1
(unassisted) Luc Wilson (7) – 35:28	3–1
(Murr, Koch) Sam Morton (24) – 42:51	4–1
(Krajnik) Tyler Haskins (4) – EN – 58:18	5–1
(Wilson, Steinmetz) Brian Carrabes (10) – 59:36	6–1

6 min
Penalties
8 min
23
Shots
27

Minnesota State wins series 2–0

=== Semifinals ===
==== (1) Bemidji State vs. (7) Lake Superior State ====
March 16, 2024; 7:07 pm	Bemidji State	4–1 (1–0, 2–1, 1–0)	Lake Superior State	Sanford Center; Attendance: 3,048

Game reference

Mattias Sholl
Goalies
Ethan Langenegger
Referees:
Stephen McInchak
Rick Nelson
Linesmen:
Patrick Giles
Nick Bradshaw

(Väisänen) Eric Pohlkamp (11) – 1:48	1–0
(Lawson, Wolfe) Jake McLean (6) – GW – 27:32	2–0
(Martin, Follmer) Kirklan Irey (8) – 28:30	3–0
	3–1	32:37 – Branden Piku (7) (Levandowski, Westcott)
(Jones, Flammang) Jere Väisänen (9) – EN – 59:50	4–1

4 min
Penalties
4 min
38
Shots
14

==== (3) Michigan Tech vs. (4) Minnesota State ====
March 16, 2024; 5:07 pm	Michigan Tech	4–3 (0–1, 1–1, 3–1)	Minnesota State	MacInnes Student Ice Arena; Attendance: 3,527

Game reference

Blake Pietila
Goalies
Alex Tracy
Referees:
Bruce Vida
Brady Johnson
Linesmen:
Tyler Landman
Nathan Voll

	0–1	7:08 – Lucas Sowder (13) (unassisted)
(Koskipirtti, Bronte) Jack Works (10) – 23:00	1–1
	1–2	29:13 – Will Hillman (2) (Haskins, Wheeler)
(Koskipirtti, Mosley) Kash Rasmussen (3) – PP – 41:34	2–2
	2–3	45:57 – Adam Eisele (8) (Wilson)
(unassisted) Logan Pietila (8) – PS – 55:27	3–3
(Mosley) Logan Pietila (9) – GW – 59:51	4–3

4 min
Penalties
4 min
38
Shots
32

=== Championship ===
==== (1) Bemidji State vs. (3) Michigan Tech ====
March 22, 2024; 7:07 pm	Bemidji State	1–2 (1–1, 0–1, 0–0)	Michigan Tech	Sanford Center; Attendance: 4,373

Game reference

Mattias Sholl
Goalies
Blake Pietila
Referees:
Brady Johnson
Bruce Vida Jr.
Linesmen:
Tyler Landman
Nathan Voll

(Jouppi, Jutting) Kasper Magnussen (7) – 14:07	1–0
	1–1	14:59 – Chase Pietila (3) (Nordstrom, Bartle)
	1–2	29:20 – GW – Ryland Mosley (18) (Campbell)

0 min
Penalties
2 min
35
Shots
27
