= 2023–24 Augustana (South Dakota) Vikings men's ice hockey season =

2023–24 Augustana Vikings men's ice hockey season
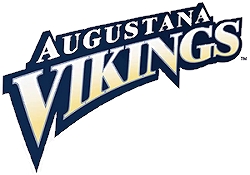
- Conference: NA CCHA
- Home ice: Denny Sanford Premier Center; Midco Arena

Rankings
- USCHO: NR
- USA Hockey: NR

Record
- Overall: 12–18–4
- Conference: 0–0–0
- Home: 5–6–2
- Road: 7–12–2

Coaches and captains
- Head coach: Garrett Raboin
- Assistant coaches: Taylor Nelson; Chad Demers; Brandon Wildung
- Captain: Arnaud Vachon
- Alternate captain(s): Shay Donovan; Luke Mobley

The 2023–24 Augustana (South Dakota) Vikings men's ice hockey season was the inaugural season of play for the program and 1st in the CCHA. The Vikings represented Augustana University, played their home games at Midco Arena and were coached by Garrett Raboin in his 1st season.

== Season ==
Due to ongoing construction of the Midco Arena, Augustana played its first five home games at the Denny Sanford Premier Center. The Vikings will play a transitional conference schedule in their first two seasons, meeting each CCHA opponent for one weekend series each year (16 games). None of the games against their conference opponents were counted in the league standings. As a result, Augustana is ineligible for the conference tournament until 2026. Despite this, because Augustana was starting its program at the Division I level and not moving up from a lower level, they were eligible for the NCAA tournament in their first season.

Unsurprisingly, Augustana finished with a losing record in their inaugural season but the team was anything but unsuccessful. Early in the season, a tie against one of the top teams in the nation, Denver was followed up by defeating another tournament-hopeful in Colorado College. While the Vikings weren't able to sustain that level of play, the team did demonstrate that they were more than just a collection of spare parts and castaways. The team had many close losses throughout the year, several against well-regarded programs such as Notre Dame. The season's biggest win, however, came against #16 Arizona State, the first victory for the Vikings over a ranked opponent.

== Departures ==
None; Augustana did not field a club team prior to their first varsity season.

== Recruiting ==
The entire roster was complied of new entries to the program.

== Roster ==
As of July 20, 2023.

No.	Nat.	Player	Class	Pos	Height	Weight	DoB	Hometown	Previous team	NHL rights
3	(United States)	Anthony Stark	Graduate	D	5' 9" (1.75 m)	170 lb (77 kg)	1999-04-09	New York, New York	Colgate (ECAC)	—
6	(United States)	Ethan Perrault	Freshman	D	6' 3" (1.91 m)	195 lb (88 kg)	2003-01-26	Tipp City, Ohio	Johnstown (NAHL)	—
7	(Canada)	Evan McIntyre	Junior	D	5' 10" (1.78 m)	174 lb (79 kg)	2000-10-17	Oakville, Ontario	Ohio State (Big Ten)	—
8	(United States)	Ben Troumbly	Sophomore	F	5' 7" (1.7 m)	160 lb (73 kg)	2001-11-21	Bovey, Minnesota	Bismarck (NAHL)	—
9	(United States)	Hayden Hennen	Freshman	D	6' 4" (1.93 m)	175 lb (79 kg)	2002-08-13	Hallock, Minnesota	Anchorage (NAHL)	—
10	(Canada)	Arnaud Vachon (C)	Graduate	F	6' 2" (1.88 m)	210 lb (95 kg)	1998-05-13	Ajax, Ontario	Colgate (ECAC)	—
12	(United States)	Hunter Bischoff	Freshman	F	6' 1" (1.85 m)	182 lb (83 kg)	2003-03-24	Cohasset, Minnesota	Youngstown (USHL)	—
13	(United States)	Will Howard	Freshman	F	6' 2" (1.88 m)	195 lb (88 kg)	2002-07-30	Grand Forks, North Dakota	New Mexico (NAHL)	—
15	(United States)	Luke Mobley (A)	Junior	F	6' 3" (1.91 m)	215 lb (98 kg)	1999-11-25	St. Louis Park, Minnesota	Clarkson (ECAC)	—
17	(United States)	Ryan Naumovski	Graduate	F	6' 0" (1.83 m)	160 lb (73 kg)	1999-07-28	Shelby Township, Michigan	Niagara (AHA)	—
19	(United States)	Will Svenddal	Sophomore	D	6' 1" (1.85 m)	195 lb (88 kg)	2001-10-12	Minneapolis, Minnesota	Minnesota (NAHL)	—
20	(Finland)	Uula Ruikka	Junior	D	5' 9" (1.75 m)	168 lb (76 kg)	2000-05-28	Oulu, Finland	Providence (HEA)	—
21	(United States)	Quinn Rudrud	Sophomore	F	6' 3" (1.91 m)	185 lb (84 kg)	2001-08-18	Farmington, Minnesota	Alaska (NCAA)	—
22	(United States)	Brady Ziemer	Junior	D	5' 10" (1.78 m)	180 lb (82 kg)	2000-05-24	Carver, Minnesota	St. Cloud State (NCHC)	—
23	(Sweden)	Simon Falk	Junior	F	6' 3" (1.91 m)	200 lb (91 kg)	2000-01-20	Västerås, Sweden	Alaska (NCAA)	—
24	(Canada)	Colton Friesen	Sophomore	F	5' 10" (1.78 m)	170 lb (77 kg)	2001-12-09	Winnipeg, Manitoba	Wisconsin–Superior (WIAC)	—
25	(United States)	Brian Silver	Senior	F	5' 11" (1.8 m)	180 lb (82 kg)	2000-11-06	Lake Bluff, Illinois	Miami (NCHC)	—
26	(Canada)	Callum Gau	Freshman	F	6' 2" (1.88 m)	180 lb (82 kg)	2002-06-19	Camrose, Alberta	Camrose (AJHL)	—
27	(United States)	Chase Brand	Graduate	F	5' 9" (1.75 m)	170 lb (77 kg)	1999-02-25	Park Rapids, Minnesota	St. Cloud State (NCHC)	—
28	(United States)	Shay Donovan (A)	Graduate	D	6' 3" (1.91 m)	195 lb (88 kg)	1998-05-26	Duluth, Minnesota	Wisconsin (Big Ten)	—
29	(United States)	Kayden Hargraves	Freshman	G	6' 1" (1.85 m)	175 lb (79 kg)	2002-02-25	Cheyenne, Wyoming	Fairbanks (NAHL)	—
32	(Canada)	Josh Kotai	Freshman	G	6' 2" (1.88 m)	175 lb (79 kg)	2003-03-13	Abbotsford, British Columbia	Battlefords (SJHL)	—
40	(Canada)	Zack Rose	Senior	G	6' 1" (1.85 m)	185 lb (84 kg)	1999-07-03	Paradise, Newfoundland and Labrador	Bowling Green (CCHA)	—
72	(Canada)	Brett Meerman	Freshman	F	5' 9" (1.75 m)	177 lb (80 kg)	2002-02-04	Blackfalds, Alberta	Blackfalds (AJHL)	—
81	(United States)	Owen Bohn	Freshman	F	5' 11" (1.8 m)	165 lb (75 kg)	2002-02-12	Morgan Hill, California	Victoria (BCHL)	—
84	(United States)	Jeff Hutchinson	Freshman	D	6' 2" (1.88 m)	200 lb (91 kg)	2002-05-02	St. Louis, Missouri	New Mexico (NAHL)	—

== Standings ==
2023–24 Central Collegiate Hockey Association Standings
	Conference record										Overall record					
	GP	W	L	T	OTW	OTL	SW	PTS	GF	GA	GP	W	L	T	GF	GA
Bemidji State †	24	15	7	2	2	1	2	48	82	64	38	20	16	2	117	111
St. Thomas	24	12	11	1	0	2	0	39	68	62	37	15	20	2	97	105
#19 Michigan Tech*	24	12	10	2	1	2	0	39	63	54	40	19	15	6	109	102
Minnesota State	24	12	10	2	2	1	1	38	73	62	37	18	15	4	111	96
Northern Michigan	24	10	10	4	1	1	2	36	57	67	34	12	16	6	83	105
Bowling Green	24	11	12	1	1	1	1	35	60	69	36	13	22	1	86	116
Lake Superior State	24	11	12	1	2	2	0	34	79	73	38	17	20	1	114	113
Ferris State	24	6	17	1	3	2	1	19	49	80	36	10	24	2	83	125
Augustana ^	0	0	0	0	0	0	0	0	0	0	34	12	18	4	90	105
Championship: March 22, 2024 † indicates conference regular season champion (MacNaughton Cup) * indicates conference tournament champion (Mason Cup)^ Augustana is playing a transition schedule of 16 games against conference opponents that are not counted in the standings Rankings: USCHO.com Top 20 Poll

== Schedule and results ==
Date	Time	Opponent^{#}	Rank^{#}	Site	TV	Decision	Result	Attendance	Record
Regular Season
October 7	7:00 pm	at Wisconsin*		Kohl Center • Madison, Wisconsin	BTN+	Rose	L 0–4	5,703	0–1–0
October 8	5:00 pm	at Wisconsin*		Kohl Center • Madison, Wisconsin	BTN+	Kotai	L 0–3	6,646	0–2–0
October 14	6:07 pm	Bowling Green		Denny Sanford Premier Center • Sioux Falls, South Dakota	FloHockey, Midco	Rose	W 3–2	3,664	1–2–0
October 15	5:07 pm	Bowling Green		Denny Sanford Premier Center • Sioux Falls, South Dakota	FloHockey	Rose	W 4–1	2,891	2–2–0
October 27	8:00 pm	at #2 Denver*		Magness Arena • Denver, Colorado		Rose	T 5–5 ^{OT}	5,343	2–2–1
October 28	7:00 pm	at Colorado College*		Ed Robson Arena • Colorado Springs, Colorado		Kotai	W 4–3	3,407	3–2–1
November 3	6:07 pm	at Michigan Tech		MacInnes Student Ice Arena • Houghton, Michigan	FloHockey	Kotai	L 4–6	2,527	3–3–1
November 4	5:07 pm	at Michigan Tech		MacInnes Student Ice Arena • Houghton, Michigan	FloHockey	Kotai	L 3–4 ^{OT}	3,021	3–4–1
November 10	7:10 pm	at Lindenwood*		Centene Community Ice Center • St. Charles, Missouri		Rose	W 4–3 ^{OT}	1,607	4–4–1
November 11	7:10 pm	at Lindenwood*		Centene Community Ice Center • St. Charles, Missouri		Kotai	L 3–5	—	4–5–1
November 24	7:07 pm	at Omaha*		Baxter Arena • Omaha, Nebraska		Rose	L 1–2	7,285	4–6–1
November 25	6:07 pm	Omaha*		Denny Sanford Premier Center • Sioux Falls, South Dakota	FloHockey, Midco	Rose	L 2–5	3,265	4–7–1
December 1	6:07 pm	at Northern Michigan		Berry Events Center • Marquette, Michigan	FloHockey	Kotai	T 2–2 ^{OT}	2,859	4–7–2
December 2	5:07 pm	at Northern Michigan		Berry Events Center • Marquette, Michigan	FloHockey	Kotai	W 5–3	2,911	5–7–2
December 15	10:07 pm	at Alaska*		Carlson Center • Fairbanks, Alaska	FloHockey	Kotai	L 2–5	2,343	5–8–2
December 16	10:07 pm	at Alaska*		Carlson Center • Fairbanks, Alaska	FloHockey	Hargraves	W 3–2 ^{OT}	2,892	6–8–2
December 30	4:00 pm	at Notre Dame*		Compton Family Ice Arena • Notre Dame, Indiana	Peacock	Hargraves	L 1–5	5,136	6–9–2
December 31	4:00 pm	at Notre Dame*		Compton Family Ice Arena • Notre Dame, Indiana	Peacock	Rose	L 2–3 ^{OT}	5,022	6–10–2
January 5	7:07 pm	Minnesota State		Denny Sanford Premier Center • Sioux Falls, South Dakota	FloHockey, Midco	Rose	T 3–3 ^{OT}	3,211	6–10–3
January 6	6:07 pm	Minnesota State		Denny Sanford Premier Center • Sioux Falls, South Dakota	FloHockey, Midco	Kotai	L 1–2	3,363	6–11–3
January 19	8:00 pm	at #16 Arizona State*		Mullett Arena • Tempe, Arizona		Rose	W 5–4	4,836	7–11–3
January 20	8:00 pm	at #16 Arizona State*		Mullett Arena • Tempe, Arizona		Kotai	L 2–3	4,892	7–12–3
January 26	7:07 pm	Ferris State		Midco Arena • Sioux Falls, South Dakota	FloHockey, Midco	Rose	L 2–5	3,183	7–13–3
January 27	7:07 pm	Ferris State		Midco Arena • Sioux Falls, South Dakota	FloHockey, Midco	Kotai	L 3–4 ^{OT}	3,141	7–14–3
February 2	7:07 pm	at Bemidji State		Sanford Center • Bemidji, Minnesota	FloHockey	Kotai	L 0–5	2,050	7–15–3
February 3	6:07 pm	at Bemidji State		Sanford Center • Bemidji, Minnesota	FloHockey	Hargraves	W 5–2	2,435	8–15–3
February 9	7:07 pm	St. Thomas		Midco Arena • Sioux Falls, South Dakota	FloHockey, Midco	Hargraves	W 4–2	2,422	9–15–3
February 10	7:07 pm	St. Thomas		Midco Arena • Sioux Falls, South Dakota	FloHockey, Midco	Hargraves	W 2–1 ^{OT}	2,591	10–15–3
February 16	6:07 pm	at Lake Superior State		Taffy Abel Arena • Sault Ste. Marie, Michigan	FloHockey	Hargraves	L 0–3	742	10–16–3
February 17	5:07 pm	at Lake Superior State		Taffy Abel Arena • Sault Ste. Marie, Michigan	FloHockey	Rose	W 3–0	1,015	11–16–3
February 23	7:07 pm	Alaska Anchorage*		Midco Arena • Sioux Falls, South Dakota	FloHockey, Midco	Hargraves	L 5–6	2,371	11–17–3
February 24	6:07 pm	Alaska Anchorage*		Midco Arena • Sioux Falls, South Dakota	FloHockey, Midco	Rose	W 3–0	2,718	12–17–3
March 1	7:07 pm	Alaska*		Midco Arena • Sioux Falls, South Dakota	FloHockey	Kotai	T 2–2 ^{OT}	2,667	12–17–4
March 2	6:07 pm	Alaska*		Midco Arena • Sioux Falls, South Dakota	FloHockey	Rose	L 0–2	3,097	12–18–4
March 8	7:07 pm	USNTDP*		Midco Arena • Sioux Falls, South Dakota (Exhibition)	FloHockey	Hargraves	L 3–8	2,532	
March 9	6:07 pm	USNTDP*		Midco Arena • Sioux Falls, South Dakota (Exhibition)	FloHockey	Rose	L 0–3	2,699	
*Non-conference game. ^{#}Rankings from USCHO.com Poll. All times are in Central Time. Source:

== Scoring statistics ==
Name	Position	Games	Goals	Assists	Points	PIM
Ryan Naumovski	F	34	8	17	25	0
Luke Mobley	F	34	12	7	19	23
Arnaud Vachon	F	34	8	8	16	27
Uula Ruikka	D	29	5	9	14	30
Hayden Hennen	D	32	4	10	14	10
Ben Troumbly	F	28	5	8	13	14
Brett Meerman	F	29	3	10	13	2
Quinn Rudrud	F	29	5	7	12	12
Owen Bohn	F	31	6	5	12	18
Chase Brand	F	30	5	7	12	15
Colton Friesen	F	24	3	8	11	6
Evan McIntyre	D	34	3	8	11	16
Brady Ziemer	D	34	3	7	10	10
Will Howard	F	25	4	5	9	6
Shay Donovan	D	32	2	6	8	14
Jack Jensen	F	15	4	4	8	23
Hunter Bischoff	F	26	4	4	8	2
Simon Falk	F	26	0	7	7	4
Callum Gau	F	28	2	3	5	20
Anthony Stark	D	30	2	3	5	4
Will Svenddal	F	19	0	2	2	8
Zack Rose	G	16	0	1	1	0
Jeff Hutchinson	D	21	0	1	1	6
Kayden Hargraves	G	9	0	0	0	0
Josh Kotai	G	13	0	0	0	0
Brian Silver	F	16	0	0	0	8
Total			88	147	236	278

== Goaltending statistics ==
Name	Games	Minutes	Wins	Losses	Ties	Goals against	Saves	Shut outs	SV %	GAA
Zack Rose	15	863:31	6	6	2	39	463	2	.922	2.71
Kayden Hargraves	9	462:27	4	3	0	21	241	0	.920	2.72
Josh Kotai	13	722:36	2	9	2	40	378	0	.904	3.32
Empty Net	-	24:24	-	-	-	5	-	-	-	-
Total	34	2072:58	12	18	4	105	1082	2	.912	3.04

== Rankings ==
Poll	Week																										
Poll	Pre	1	2	3	4	5	6	7	8	9	10	11	12	13	14	15	16	17	18	19	20	21	22	23	24	25	26 (Final)
USCHO.com	NR	NR	NR	NR	NR	NR	NR	NR	NR	NR	NR	–	NR	NR	NR	NR	NR	NR	NR	NR	NR	NR	NR	NR	NR	–	NR
USA Hockey	NR	NR	NR	NR	NR	NR	NR	NR	NR	NR	NR	NR	–	NR	NR	NR	NR	NR	NR	NR	NR	NR	NR	NR	NR	NR	NR

Note: USCHO did not release a poll in weeks 11 and 25.
Note: USA Hockey did not release a poll in week 12.
