= 2023–24 Northern Michigan Wildcats men's ice hockey season =

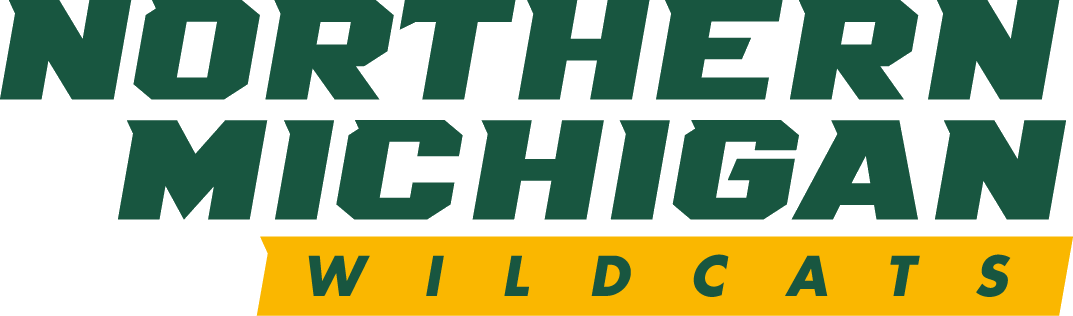
- Conference: 5th CCHA
- Home ice: Berry Events Center

Rankings
- USCHO: NR
- USA Hockey: NR

Record
- Overall: 12–16–6
- Conference: 10–10–4
- Home: 10–4–2
- Road: 2–12–4

Coaches and captains
- Head coach: Grant Potulny
- Assistant coaches: Byron Pool; Nick Peruzzi; Jimmy Spratt
- Captains: Aiden Gallacher; André Ghantous; Artem Shlaine

The 2023–24 Northern Michigan Wildcats men's ice hockey season was the 48th season of play for the program and 26th in the CCHA. The Wildcats represented Northern Michigan University in the 2023–24 NCAA Division I men's ice hockey season, played their home games at Berry Events Center and were coached by Grant Potulny in his 7th season.

== Season ==
Despite high hopes for a squad that was picked to finish second in the conference pre-season poll, Northern Michigan got off to a poor start. With four games against ranked opponents to begin with, the Wildcats had the opportunity to gain some notoriety early in the year, however, Béni Halász struggled in goal and the team was unable to overcome his slump. One bright spot was the stellar debut of Tanner Latsch, who had sat out the entire previous season while recovering from hip surgery. The redshirt freshman recorded a hat-trick in his first college game and then scored in each of the next three as well. Unfortunately, he was bit by the injury bug against Ferris State and played just three games afterwards.

The loss of Latsch was bad enough but the team was also in desperate need for offense. Northern Michigan got a reprieve in mid-November when backup Charlie Glockner turned in a few good performances but those results were unsustainable. Halász did start playing better once he got his starting job back but the scoring never really materialized. Over the course of the season, the Wildcats recorded 40 fewer goals than they had in 2023, which equated to about 0.8 goals per game. Even with the defense improving as the season went along, that missing offense prevented the team from being able to capitalize on its chances and left NMU stuck in neutral. In the second half of the season, Northern Michigan lost just five games, however, the team was unable to break a tie on several occasions and could only manage a .500 mark in the spring semester.

The mediocre results placed the team 5th in the conference and forced them to hit the road for their playoff series with Minnesota State. The first game saw the Wildcats outshoot the Mavericks by a wide margin, particularly in the second, but the pop-gun offense could only muster a single goal and the team fell 1–2. They opened the scoring in the rematch with a shorty from André Ghantous but afterwards NMU could only watch as the Minnesota State offense poured on the offense to the tune of 6 goals. The Wildcats couldn't come close to matching that output and quietly ended their disappointing season.

After the season, Grant Potulny stepped down as head coach to continue his career in the professional ranks.

== Departures ==
Player	Position	Nationality	Cause
Nathan Butler	Forward	United States	Left program (retired)
Rico DiMatteo	Goaltender	United States	Transferred to Long Island
Vincent De Mey	Forward	United States	Graduation (signed with Kansas City Mavericks)
Alex Frye	Forward	United States	Graduation (signed with Orlando Solar Bears)
Jett Jungels	Forward	United States	Graduation (retired)
David Keefer	Forward	United States	Graduation (signed with Kalamazoo Wings)
Simon Kjellberg	Defenseman	Sweden	Graduation (retired)
Joey Larson	Forward	United States	Transferred to Michigan State
A. J. Vanderbeck	Forward	United States	Graduation (signed with Kansas City Mavericks)
Tanner Vescio	Defenseman	United States	Graduation (retired)
Brett Willits	Forward	Canada	Left program (retired)

== Recruiting ==
Player	Position	Nationality	Age	Notes
Mitchel Deelstra	Forward	Canada	24	Wallace, ON; transfer from Ferris State
Viking Gustafsson Nyberg	Defenseman	Sweden	20	Stockholm, SWE
Travis Hensrud	Forward	Canada	21	Thunder Bay, ON
Matvei Kabanov	Forward	Russia	20	Togliatti, RUS
Kevin Marx Norén	Forward	Sweden	21	Knivsta, SWE
Michael Mesic	Forward	United States	19	Plymouth, MI
Jack Perbix	Defenseman\Forward	United States	22	Elk River, MN; graduate transfer from Western Michigan; selected 116th overall in 2018
Brendan Poshak	Forward	United States	21	Green Bay, WI
Grant Slukynsky	Forward	United States	21	Edina, MN
Carsen Stokes	Goaltender	United States	21	Prior Lake, MN
Jeppe Urup	Defenseman	Denmark	24	Odense, DEN; graduate transfer from Sacred Heart

== Roster ==
As of September 18, 2023.

No.	Nat.	Player	Class	Pos	Height	Weight	DoB	Hometown	Previous team	NHL rights
1	(United States)	Charlie Glockner	Junior	G	6' 3" (1.91 m)	181 lb (82 kg)	2000-06-27	Minnetonka, Minnesota	Waterloo Black Hawks (USHL)	—
4	(Canada)	Michael Van Unen	Graduate	D	6' 1" (1.85 m)	190 lb (86 kg)	1999-02-26	Kamloops, British Columbia	Merritt Centennials (BCHL)	—
5	(United States)	Colby Enns	Senior (RS)	D	6' 2" (1.88 m)	201 lb (91 kg)	1999-09-16	Minot, North Dakota	Lincoln Stars (USHL)	—
6	(Sweden)	Kevin Marx-Norén	Freshman	F	6' 1" (1.85 m)	190 lb (86 kg)	2002-07-15	Knivsta, Sweden	Minnesota Wilderness (NAHL)	—
7	(United States)	Brendan Poshak	Freshman	F	5' 8" (1.73 m)	170 lb (77 kg)	2002-07-13	Green Bay, Wisconsin	Brooks Bandits (AJHL)	—
8	(Russia)	Artem Shlaine (C)	Senior	F	6' 1" (1.85 m)	190 lb (86 kg)	2002-03-07	Moscow, Russia	Connecticut (HEA)	NJD, 130th overall 2020
9	(Canada)	Josh Zinger	Sophomore	D	5' 11" (1.8 m)	185 lb (84 kg)	2001-08-05	Red Deer, Alberta	Brooks Bandits (AJHL)	—
10	(United States)	Aiden Gallacher (C)	Senior	D	6' 1" (1.85 m)	205 lb (93 kg)	2000-03-20	Rochester Hills, Michigan	Michigan State (Big Ten)	—
11	(United States)	André Ghantous (C)	Graduate	F	5' 9" (1.75 m)	185 lb (84 kg)	1998-12-07	Glendale, California	Penticton Vees (BCHL)	—
12	(United States)	Jack Perbix	Graduate	F	6' 1" (1.85 m)	185 lb (84 kg)	2000-09-13	Elk River, Minnesota	Western Michigan (NCHC)	ANA, 116th overall 2018
13	(United States)	Mikey Colella	Senior	F	5' 7" (1.7 m)	155 lb (70 kg)	1999-06-12	Wenonah, New Jersey	Trail Smoke Eaters (BCHL)	—
14	(Canada)	Tyrell Boucher	Senior	D	6' 1" (1.85 m)	185 lb (84 kg)	1999-06-03	Nampa, Alberta	Cowichan Valley Capitals (BCHL)	—
15	(Canada)	Rylan Van Unen	Senior	F	6' 1" (1.85 m)	190 lb (86 kg)	1999-02-26	Kamloops, British Columbia	Merritt Centennials (BCHL)	—
16	(Hungary)	Kristóf Papp	Senior	F	5' 11" (1.8 m)	176 lb (80 kg)	2001-06-27	Budapest, Hungary	Michigan State (Big Ten)	—
17	(United States)	Luke Gramer	Sophomore	D	5' 9" (1.75 m)	180 lb (82 kg)	2002-07-02	Moorhead, Minnesota	Fargo Force (USHL)	—
18	(United States)	Michael Mesic	Freshman	F	5' 9" (1.75 m)	180 lb (82 kg)	2004-08-15	Plymouth, Michigan	Lincoln Stars (USHL)	—
19	(United States)	Grant Slukynsky	Freshman	F	6' 1" (1.85 m)	200 lb (91 kg)	2002-03-12	Edina, Minnesota	Sioux City Musketeers (USHL)	—
20	(Canada)	Mitch Deelstra	Senior	F	6' 0" (1.83 m)	191 lb (87 kg)	1999-07-15	Wallace, Ontario	Ferris State (CCHA)	—
21	(Canada)	Connor Eddy	Sophomore	F	6' 1" (1.85 m)	200 lb (91 kg)	2002-04-18	Victoria, British Columbia	Victoria Grizzlies (BCHL)	—
22	(United States)	Tanner Latsch	Freshman (RS)	F	6' 2" (1.88 m)	190 lb (86 kg)	2002-01-02	Muskegon, Michigan	Des Moines Buccaneers (USHL)	—
23	(United States)	Jakob Peterson	Sophomore (RS)	D	6' 3" (1.91 m)	172 lb (78 kg)	2002-04-18	Marquette, Michigan	Amarillo Wranglers (NAHL)	—
24	(Canada)	Isack Bandu	Sophomore	D	6' 2" (1.88 m)	195 lb (88 kg)	2001-05-03	Montreal, Quebec	Victoria Grizzlies (BCHL)	—
25	(Denmark)	Jeppe Urup	Graduate	D	6' 2" (1.88 m)	196 lb (89 kg)	1999-03-14	Odense, Denmark	Sacred Heart (AHA)	—
26	(Canada)	Travis Hensrud	Freshman	F	5' 11" (1.8 m)	185 lb (84 kg)	2002-05-02	Thunder Bay, Ontario	Steinbach Pistons (MJHL)	—
27	(United States)	Zach Michaelis	Sophomore	F	6' 1" (1.85 m)	203 lb (92 kg)	2002-05-30	Elk River, Minnesota	Trail Smoke Eaters (BCHL)	—
28	(Sweden)	Viking Gustafsson Nyberg	Freshman	D	6' 6" (1.98 m)	205 lb (93 kg)	2003-09-21	Stockholm, Sweden	Leksands IF J20 (J20 Nationell)	—
29	(Canada)	Reilly Funk	Sophomore (RS)	F	6' 3" (1.91 m)	194 lb (88 kg)	2000-12-23	Portage, Manitoba	Youngstown Phantoms (USHL)	—
30	(Hungary)	Béni Halász	Sophomore	G	5' 11" (1.8 m)	184 lb (83 kg)	2001-08-13	Budapest, Hungary	New Mexico Ice Wolves (NAHL)	—
32	(United States)	Carsen Stokes	Freshman	G	5' 10" (1.78 m)	170 lb (77 kg)	2002-02-13	Prior Lake, Minnesota	New Mexico Ice Wolves (NAHL)	—
33	(Russia)	Matvei Kabanov	Freshman	F	5' 11" (1.8 m)	160 lb (73 kg)	2003-01-15	Togliatti, Russia	Amurskie (MHL)	—

== Standings ==
2023–24 Central Collegiate Hockey Association Standings
	Conference record										Overall record					
	GP	W	L	T	OTW	OTL	SW	PTS	GF	GA	GP	W	L	T	GF	GA
Bemidji State †	24	15	7	2	2	1	2	48	82	64	38	20	16	2	117	111
St. Thomas	24	12	11	1	0	2	0	39	68	62	37	15	20	2	97	105
#19 Michigan Tech*	24	12	10	2	1	2	0	39	63	54	40	19	15	6	109	102
Minnesota State	24	12	10	2	2	1	1	38	73	62	37	18	15	4	111	96
Northern Michigan	24	10	10	4	1	1	2	36	57	67	34	12	16	6	83	105
Bowling Green	24	11	12	1	1	1	1	35	60	69	36	13	22	1	86	116
Lake Superior State	24	11	12	1	2	2	0	34	79	73	38	17	20	1	114	113
Ferris State	24	6	17	1	3	2	1	19	49	80	36	10	24	2	83	125
Augustana ^	0	0	0	0	0	0	0	0	0	0	34	12	18	4	90	105
Championship: March 22, 2024 † indicates conference regular season champion (MacNaughton Cup) * indicates conference tournament champion (Mason Cup)^ Augustana is playing a transition schedule of 16 games against conference opponents that are not counted in the standings Rankings: USCHO.com Top 20 Poll

== Schedule and results ==
Date	Time	Opponent^{#}	Rank^{#}	Site	TV	Decision	Result	Attendance	Record
Regular Season
October 13	8:07 pm	at #17 Minnesota Duluth*		AMSOIL Arena • Duluth, Minnesota		Halász	T 5–5 ^{OT}	5,947	0–0–1
October 14	8:07 pm	at #17 Minnesota Duluth*		AMSOIL Arena • Duluth, Minnesota		Glockner	L 5–8	6,497	0–1–1
October 20	9:00 pm	at #18 Arizona State*		Mullett Arena • Tempe, Arizona		Halász	L 2–3	4,495	0–2–1
October 21	9:00 pm	at #18 Arizona State*		Mullett Arena • Tempe, Arizona		Halász	L 1–5	4,357	0–3–1
October 27	7:07 pm	Ferris State		Berry Events Center • Marquette, Michigan	FloHockey	Halász	L 1–2 ^{OT}	4,040	0–4–1 (0–1–0)
October 28	6:07 pm	Ferris State		Berry Events Center • Marquette, Michigan	FloHockey	Halász	W 4–1	4,135	1–4–1 (1–1–0)
November 3	8:07 pm	at St. Thomas		St. Thomas Ice Arena • Mendota Heights, Minnesota	FloHockey	Halász	L 2–4	614	1–5–1 (1–2–0)
November 4	7:07 pm	at St. Thomas		St. Thomas Ice Arena • Mendota Heights, Minnesota	FloHockey	Halász	L 1–6	922	1–6–1 (1–3–0)
November 10	7:07 pm	Lake Superior State		Berry Events Center • Marquette, Michigan	FloHockey	Halász	W 6–4	3,239	2–6–1 (2–3–0)
November 11	6:07 pm	Lake Superior State		Berry Events Center • Marquette, Michigan	FloHockey	Glockner	W 4–3 ^{OT}	3,774	3–6–1 (3–3–0)
November 17	7:07 pm	Alaska*		Berry Events Center • Marquette, Michigan	FloHockey	Glockner	W 3–1	2,303	4–6–1
November 18	6:07 pm	Alaska*		Berry Events Center • Marquette, Michigan	FloHockey	Glockner	W 3–1	2,381	5–6–1
November 24	7:07 pm	at Bowling Green		Slater Family Ice Arena • Bowling Green, Ohio	FloHockey	Glockner	L 2–6	2,610	5–7–1 (3–4–0)
November 25	7:07 pm	at Bowling Green		Slater Family Ice Arena • Bowling Green, Ohio	FloHockey	Halász	W 2–0	1,340	6–7–1 (4–4–0)
December 1	7:07 pm	Augustana*		Berry Events Center • Marquette, Michigan	FloHockey	Halász	T 2–2 ^{OT}	2,859	6–7–2
December 2	6:07 pm	Augustana*		Berry Events Center • Marquette, Michigan	FloHockey	Glockner	L 3–5	2,911	6–8–2
December 8	7:07 pm	at Michigan Tech		MacInnes Student Ice Arena • Houghton, Michigan (Rivalry)	FloHockey	Halász	L 2–4	3,649	6–9–2 (4–5–0)
December 9	6:07 pm	Michigan Tech		Berry Events Center • Marquette, Michigan (Rivalry)	FloHockey	Halász	W 3–1	—	7–9–2 (5–5–0)
January 6	6:07 pm	Michigan Tech*		Berry Events Center • Marquette, Michigan (Rivalry, Exhibition)	FloHockey	Halász	W 7–2	3,911	
January 12	7:07 pm	at Lake Superior State		Taffy Abel Arena • Sault Ste. Marie, Michigan	FloHockey	Halász	L 1–5	995	7–10–2 (5–6–0)
January 13	6:07 pm	at Lake Superior State		Taffy Abel Arena • Sault Ste. Marie, Michigan	FloHockey	Glockner	L 2–5	877	7–11–2 (5–7–0)
January 19	7:07 pm	St. Thomas		Berry Events Center • Marquette, Michigan	FloHockey	Halász	W 3–2	2,562	8–11–2 (6–7–0)
January 20	6:07 pm	St. Thomas		Berry Events Center • Marquette, Michigan	FloHockey	Halász	L 1–3	—	8–12–2 (6–8–0)
January 26	8:07 pm	at Minnesota State		Mayo Clinic Health System Event Center • Mankato, Minnesota	FloHockey	Halász	T 2–2 ^{SOW}	4,667	8–12–3 (6–8–1)
January 27	7:07 pm	at Minnesota State		Mayo Clinic Health System Event Center • Mankato, Minnesota	FloHockey	Halász	L 0–4	4,981	8–13–3 (6–9–1)
February 2	7:07 pm	Michigan Tech		Berry Events Center • Marquette, Michigan (Rivalry)	FloHockey	Halász	W 4–1	4,260	9–13–3 (7–9–1)
February 3	6:07 pm	at Michigan Tech		MacInnes Student Ice Arena • Houghton, Michigan (Rivalry)	FloHockey	Halász	T 3–3 ^{SOW}	3,730	9–13–4 (7–9–2)
February 9	7:07 pm	Bemidji State		Berry Events Center • Marquette, Michigan	FloHockey	Halász	L 2–4	2,645	9–14–4 (7–10–2)
February 10	6:07 pm	Bemidji State		Berry Events Center • Marquette, Michigan	FloHockey	Halász	T 3–3 ^{SOL}	3,011	9–14–5 (7–10–3)
February 23	7:07 pm	at Ferris State		Ewigleben Arena • Big Rapids, Michigan	FloHockey	Halász	W 3–2	1,950	10–14–5 (8–10–3)
February 24	6:07 pm	at Ferris State		Ewigleben Arena • Big Rapids, Michigan	FloHockey	Halász	T 1–1 ^{SOL}	2,389	10–14–6 (8–10–4)
March 1	7:07 pm	Bowling Green		Berry Events Center • Marquette, Michigan	FloHockey	Halász	W 4–1	2,565	11–14–6 (9–10–4)
March 2	6:07 pm	Bowling Green		Berry Events Center • Marquette, Michigan	FloHockey	Halász	W 1–0	3,007	12–14–6 (10–10–4)
CCHA Tournament
March 8	8:07 pm	at Minnesota State*		Mayo Clinic Health System Event Center • Mankato, Minnesota (Quarterfinal Game 1)	FloHockey	Halász	L 1–2	3,084	12–15–6
March 9	7:07 pm	at Minnesota State*		Mayo Clinic Health System Event Center • Mankato, Minnesota (Quarterfinal Game 2)	FloHockey	Halász	L 1–6	3,494	12–16–6
*Non-conference game. ^{#}Rankings from USCHO.com Poll. All times are in Eastern Time. Source:

== Scoring statistics ==
Name	Position	Games	Goals	Assists	Points	PIM
André Ghantous	RW	34	9	23	32	48
Artem Shlaine	C	27	10	13	23	23
Josh Zinger	D	34	3	17	20	20
Kristóf Papp	C	34	6	13	19	6
Kevin Marx-Norén	LW/RW	30	4	13	17	14
Connor Eddy	C	34	7	6	13	40
Michael Colella	F	34	7	5	12	6
Rylan Van Unen	F	33	4	6	10	55
Grant Slukynsky	C	34	6	3	9	6
Michael Mesic	C	26	4	5	9	8
Matvei Kabanov	LW	26	4	5	9	4
Tanner Latsch	C	8	7	1	8	6
Aiden Gallacher	D	34	3	5	8	25
Isack Bandu	D	26	1	4	5	45
Reilly Funk	C	17	2	2	4	10
Mike Van Unen	D	17	1	3	4	8
Colby Enns	D	28	1	3	4	4
Jack Perbix	D/RW	31	1	3	4	35
Viking Gustafsson Nyberg	C	33	2	1	3	24
Mitch Deelstra	LW	25	1	2	3	8
Zach Michaelis	C	9	0	3	3	2
Jakob Peterson	D	18	0	1	1	2
Tyrell Boucher	D	21	0	1	1	4
Brendan Poshak	F	7	0	0	0	0
Jeppe Urup	D	8	0	0	0	2
Charlie Glockner	G	9	0	0	0	0
Béni Halász	G	28	0	0	0	15
Total			83	138	221	438

== Goaltending statistics ==
Name	Games	Minutes	Wins	Losses	Ties	Goals Against	Saves	Shut Outs	SV %	GAA
Béni Halász	28	1650:30	9	12	6	78	707	2	.901	2.84
Charlie Glockner	10	405:12	3	4	0	22	169	0	.885	3.26
Empty Net	-	19:57	-	-	-	5	-	-	-	-
Total	34	2075:39	12	16	6	105	876	2	.893	3.04

== Rankings ==
Poll	Week																										
Poll	Pre	1	2	3	4	5	6	7	8	9	10	11	12	13	14	15	16	17	18	19	20	21	22	23	24	25	26 (Final)
USCHO.com	NR	NR	NR	NR	NR	NR	NR	NR	NR	NR	NR	–	NR	NR	NR	NR	NR	NR	NR	NR	NR	NR	NR	NR	NR	–	NR
USA Hockey	NR	NR	NR	NR	NR	NR	NR	NR	NR	NR	NR	NR	–	NR	NR	NR	NR	NR	NR	NR	NR	NR	NR	NR	NR	NR	NR

Note: USCHO did not release a poll in weeks 11 and 25.
Note: USA Hockey did not release a poll in week 12.

== Awards and honors ==
Player	Award	Ref
Josh Zinger	CCHA Second Team	

== 2024 NHL entry draft ==
Round	Pick	Player	NHL team
7	205	Austin Moline ^{†}	Philadelphia Flyers

† incoming freshman
