= 2023–24 CCHA season =

- Season: 2023–24
- Conference: CCHA
- Division: Division I
- Sport: ice hockey
- Duration: October 7, 2023– March 29, 2024
- Number of teams: 9
- TV partner(s): FloHockey

NHL Entry Draft
- Top draft pick: Chase Pietila
- Picked by: Pittsburgh Penguins

Regular season
- Season champions: Bemidji State
- Season MVP: Sam Morton
- Top scorer: Connor Milburn

CCHA tournament
- Tournament champions: Michigan Tech
- Runners-up: Bemidji State
- Top scorer: Ryland Mosley; Logan Pietila

NCAA tournament
- Bids: 1
- Record: 0–1
- Best Finish: Regional Semifinal
- Team(s): Michigan Tech

The 2023–24 CCHA season was the 45th season of play for the Central Collegiate Hockey Association and is part of the 2023–24 NCAA Division I men's ice hockey season. The season began on October 7, 2023, and concluded on March 29, 2024 with Michigan Tech losing in the East Regional Semifinal of the NCAA tournament.

== Augustana ==
The Augustana Vikings were admitted as the 9th member of the conference on May 17, 2022 with 2023–24 being the first season of play for the program. In the first two seasons, the team would play a transitional schedule by facing the other league members twice each year for a total of 16 games. While this will prevent the team from participating in the conference tournament, the Vikings are still eligible to be selected for the NCAA tournament.

== Coaches ==
Augustana hired Garrett Raboin as the team's head coach in 2022 and began its first season of play this year.

Luke Strand was hired as the head coach for Minnesota State, replacing the departed Mike Hastings.

=== Records ===
Team	Head coach	Season at school	Record at school	CCHA record
Augustana	Garrett Raboin	1	0–0–0	0–0–0
Bemidji State	Tom Serratore	23	368–344–97	26–23–3
Bowling Green	Ty Eigner	5	71–61–10	23–26–3
Ferris State	Bob Daniels	32	487–581–112	265–307–76
Lake Superior State	Damon Whitten	10	126–176–30	21–30–1
Michigan Tech	Joe Shawhan	7	119–88–20	31–15–6
Minnesota State	Luke Strand	1	0–0–0	0–0–0
Northern Michigan	Grant Potulny	7	106–97–11	26–25–1
St. Thomas	Enrico Blasi	3	14–55–3	13–36–3

== Standings ==
2023–24 Central Collegiate Hockey Association Standings
	Conference record										Overall record					
	GP	W	L	T	OTW	OTL	SW	PTS	GF	GA	GP	W	L	T	GF	GA
Bemidji State †	24	15	7	2	2	1	2	48	82	64	38	20	16	2	117	111
St. Thomas	24	12	11	1	0	2	0	39	68	62	37	15	20	2	97	105
#19 Michigan Tech*	24	12	10	2	1	2	0	39	63	54	40	19	15	6	109	102
Minnesota State	24	12	10	2	2	1	1	38	73	62	37	18	15	4	111	96
Northern Michigan	24	10	10	4	1	1	2	36	57	67	34	12	16	6	83	105
Bowling Green	24	11	12	1	1	1	1	35	60	69	36	13	22	1	86	116
Lake Superior State	24	11	12	1	2	2	0	34	79	73	38	17	20	1	114	113
Ferris State	24	6	17	1	3	2	1	19	49	80	36	10	24	2	83	125
Augustana ^	0	0	0	0	0	0	0	0	0	0	34	12	18	4	90	105
Championship: March 22, 2024 † indicates conference regular season champion (MacNaughton Cup) * indicates conference tournament champion (Mason Cup)^ Augustana is playing a transition schedule of 16 games against conference opponents that are not counted in the standings Rankings: USCHO.com Top 20 Poll

=== Non-Conference record ===
Team	Atlantic Hockey	Big Ten	ECAC Hockey	Hockey East	Independent	NCHC	Total
Augustana	0–0–0	0–4–0	0–0–0	0–0–0	4–5–1	1–2–1	5–11–2
Bemidji State	1–0–0	0–1–0	0–0–0	0–0–0	0–0–0	0–6–0	1–7–0
Bowling Green	2–2–0	0–2–0	0–0–0	0–0–0	0–0–0	0–2–0	2–6–0
Ferris State	0–0–0	0–1–0	1–1–0	0–0–0	0–1–0	1–2–1	2–5–1
Lake Superior State	0–1–0	0–2–0	2–1–0	0–0–0	1–1–0	0–0–0	3–5–0
Michigan Tech	0–0–0	0–2–1	0–1–1	0–0–0	1–1–1	0–0–1	1–4–4
Minnesota State	0–0–0	0–0–0	1–1–0	0–2–0	0–0–0	2–1–1	3–4–1
Northern Michigan	0–0–0	0–0–0	0–0–0	0–0–0	2–2–0	0–1–1	2–3–1
St. Thomas	0–0–0	0–2–0	0–0–0	0–2–0	1–2–1	1–1–0	2–7–1
Overall	3–3–0	0–14–1	4–4–1	0–4–0	9–12–3	5–15–5	21–52–10

== Bracket ==
Teams are reseeded for the semifinals

Quarterfinals; March 8–10
1	Bemidji State	5*	4	-
8	Ferris State	4	0	-
2	St. Thomas	1	4	2
7	Lake Superior State	4	2	3
3	Michigan Tech	5	6	-
6	Bowling Green	0	5	-
4	Minnesota State	2	6	-
5	Northern Michigan	1	1	-

Semifinals; March 16
1	Bemidji State	4
7	Lake Superior State	1
3	Michigan Tech	4
4	Minnesota State	3

Championship; March 22
1	Bemidji State	1
3	Michigan Tech	2

Note: * denotes overtime period(s)

== NCAA tournament ==
March 29, 2024; 2:00 pm	(1) Boston College	6–1 (1–1, 1–0, 4–0)	(4) Michigan Tech	Amica Mutual Pavilion; Attendance: 6,988

Game reference

Jacob Fowler
Goalies
Blake Pietila
Referees:
Ryan Hersey
Nathan Wieler
Linesmen:
Tyler Ciffrio
Erik Contino

(Jellvik, Powell) Cutter Gauthier (36) – 0:36	1–0
	1–1	12:55 – SH – Max Koskipirtti (4) (unassisted)
(Malone, Hreschuk) Ryan Leonard (28) – GW – 26:57	2–1
(Malone, Powell) Connor Joyce (12) – 44:47	3–1
(Smith, Leonard) Oskar Jellvik (13) – 45:35	4–1
(Gauthier, Powell) Ryan Leonard (29) – PP – 47:58	5–1
(Jellvik, Leonard) Cutter Gauthier (37) – PP – 51:25	6–1

21 min
Penalties
31 min
38
Shots
24

Game summary
The game began with the teams exchanging rushes up the ice. After Tech lost control of the puck in front of the Eagle's net, Oskar Jellvik skated up the ice and passed the puck to Cutter Gauthier, who had gotten behind the Huskies defense on a partial break away. The nation's leading goal scorer fired the puck between Blake Pietila's legs for the opening goal. BC kept the pressure on and got several more scoring chances afterwards but Pietila had settled down and kept Tech in the game. The Huskies weren't able to establish any extended zone time until about the 8-minute mark but even then BC's speed kept Tech to the outside. About a minute later, a BC turnover in their own end resulted in two glorious scoring chances for Tech but the pipe helped to keep the puck out of the goal. As Tech started warming to the task, they got another chance after the Eagles iced the puck; MTU won the ensuing faceoff and crashed in on Jacob Fowler. The puck ended up getting past the BC goalie but bounced just to the side of the cage. Michigan Tech continued to circle and got another scoring chance a few second later but the Jack Malone blocked the shot. A further chance went wide and the puck ended up coming to Colby Ambrosio who charged down the ice on a break away. Chase Pietila managed to just catch him from behind and hook Ambrosio as he was shooting to eliminate the scoring chance. Rather than awarding Ambrosio a penalty shot, the referees handed Pietila a minor penalty. half-way through the kill, BC turned over the puck at center ice and Tech broke towards Fowler on a 2-on-0. Max Koskipirtti kept the puck and, right when he got to the faceoff dot, he fired a shot right over Fowler's glove for Tech's second short-handed goal on the season. The Huskies captured the momentum afterwards and began generating scoring opportunities in the BC zone. Now it was Fowler's turn to hold the fort and the young netminder matched Pietila save-for-save. Towards the end of the period BC regained its footing and play evened out the score remained tied at the buzzer.

Both teams picked up in the second right where they left off and got on the attack. BC turned the puck over several times in the first two minutes, giving Tech multiple scoring chances. The best went to Kash Rasmussen who found himself completely alone in front of the BC net but his shot went wide. A few seconds later, a loose puck bounced right to Koskipirtti for shot from the slot but Fowler got in the way. Eventually, the Eagles began to calm down and get into the offensive zone around the 5th minute. Jellvik got a solid scoring chance but his shot was deflected off the post by Blake Pietila. The Eagles continued to press and Ryan Leonard rushed the puck up the ice. Pietila stopped his initial shot, as well as the rebound from Aidan Hreschuk. Jack Malone found the loose puck and shuffled it over to an open Leonard who fired into a half-open cage for BC's second lead of the night. Play tilted towards Boston College afterwards but the Eagles continued to make sloppy plays and turn the puck over in dangerous areas. Tech got a few good looks at the net but the puck refused to cooperate and several chanced went by the wayside. Right off of a faceoff, Leonard broke in on Pietila and nearly tucked the puck into the goal but the Tech defense was able to turn him aside without taking a penalty. Scant second later, Gabe Perreault hit Tyrone Bronte in the head and received a match penalty. Boston College needed their #1 penalty kill to come through and it did. Michigan Tech got a few chances on Fowler, much of their time was spent trying to set up in the offensive zone and the Huskies were unable to convert on the man-advantage. BC was able to carry their narrow lead to the end of the period but they would have to finish the game missing one of their top scorers.

Michigan Tech started the third by joining BC in bad habits and committed two bad turnovers that led to chances for the Eagles. Pietila managed to keep the puck out of the net and the disjointed play continued for both sides. Eventually, BC was able to set up in the offensive zone and Connor Joyce got lost behind the net. When he popped out in front, Jack Malone found him for an easy tap in goal. Less than a minute later, BC cleared the puck into the Tech end. When Blake Pietila went behind the goal to gain possession, the rubber hit the referee in the backside and deflected into the net. However, the rule (83.6) stipulated that a goal cannot be scored due to direct interference from the officials so the goal was waved off. The reprieve for Tech didn't last long and just a minute later Will Smith got the puck to Jellvik on a break away and he put BC up by three. After the succeeding faceoff, Ryland Mosley took a run at Ryan Leonard at center ice and a melee broke out. Mosley received a match penalty while all other infractions cancelled out. A minute into the power play, Ryan Leonard netted his second goal off of a rush and the route was on. Gauthier ended the power play with his second of the game after a drop-pass in the slot from Jellvik. BC continued to press afterwards, looking for another goal, but the intensity was muted. Both teams played like they knew the game was over and soon enough it was.

== Ranking ==
=== USCHO ===
Team	Pre	1	2	3	4	5	6	7	8	9	10	12	13	14	15	16	17	18	19	20	21	22	23	24	Final
Augustana	NR	NR	NR	NR	NR	NR	NR	NR	NR	NR	NR	NR	NR	NR	NR	NR	NR	NR	NR	NR	NR	NR	NR	NR	NR
Bemidji State	NR	NR	NR	NR	NR	NR	NR	NR	NR	NR	NR	NR	NR	NR	NR	NR	NR	NR	NR	NR	NR	20	20	NR	NR
Bowling Green	NR	NR	NR	NR	NR	NR	NR	NR	NR	NR	NR	NR	NR	NR	NR	NR	NR	NR	NR	NR	NR	NR	NR	NR	NR
Ferris State	NR	NR	NR	NR	NR	NR	NR	NR	NR	NR	NR	NR	NR	NR	NR	NR	NR	NR	NR	NR	NR	NR	NR	NR	NR
Lake Superior State	NR	NR	NR	NR	NR	NR	NR	NR	NR	NR	NR	NR	NR	NR	NR	NR	NR	NR	NR	NR	NR	NR	NR	NR	NR
Michigan Tech	10	9	17	NR	NR	NR	NR	NR	NR	NR	NR	NR	NR	NR	NR	NR	NR	NR	NR	NR	NR	NR	NR	20	19
Minnesota State	NR	NR	NR	NR	NR	NR	NR	NR	NR	NR	NR	NR	NR	NR	NR	NR	NR	NR	NR	NR	NR	NR	NR	NR	NR
Northern Michigan	NR	NR	NR	NR	NR	NR	NR	NR	NR	NR	NR	NR	NR	NR	NR	NR	NR	NR	NR	NR	NR	NR	NR	NR	NR
St. Thomas	NR	NR	NR	NR	NR	NR	NR	NR	NR	NR	NR	NR	NR	NR	NR	NR	NR	NR	NR	NR	NR	NR	NR	NR	NR

=== USA Hockey ===
Team	Pre	1	2	3	4	5	6	7	8	9	10	11	13	14	15	16	17	18	19	20	21	22	23	24	25	Final
Augustana	NR	NR	NR	NR	NR	NR	NR	NR	NR	NR	NR	NR	NR	NR	NR	NR	NR	NR	NR	NR	NR	NR	NR	NR	NR	NR
Bemidji State	NR	NR	NR	NR	NR	NR	NR	NR	NR	NR	NR	NR	NR	NR	NR	NR	NR	NR	NR	NR	NR	NR	20	NR	NR	NR
Bowling Green	NR	NR	NR	NR	NR	NR	NR	NR	NR	NR	NR	NR	NR	NR	NR	NR	NR	NR	NR	NR	NR	NR	NR	NR	NR	NR
Ferris State	NR	NR	NR	NR	NR	NR	NR	NR	NR	NR	NR	NR	NR	NR	NR	NR	NR	NR	NR	NR	NR	NR	NR	NR	NR	NR
Lake Superior State	NR	NR	NR	NR	NR	NR	NR	NR	NR	NR	NR	NR	NR	NR	NR	NR	NR	NR	NR	NR	NR	NR	NR	NR	NR	NR
Michigan Tech	11	10	17	NR	NR	NR	NR	NR	NR	NR	NR	NR	NR	NR	NR	NR	NR	NR	NR	NR	NR	NR	NR	20	20	20
Minnesota State	NR	NR	NR	NR	NR	NR	NR	NR	NR	NR	NR	NR	NR	NR	NR	NR	NR	NR	NR	NR	NR	NR	NR	NR	NR	NR
Northern Michigan	NR	NR	NR	NR	NR	NR	NR	NR	NR	NR	NR	NR	NR	NR	NR	NR	NR	NR	NR	NR	NR	NR	NR	NR	NR	NR
St. Thomas	NR	NR	NR	NR	NR	NR	NR	NR	NR	NR	NR	NR	NR	NR	NR	NR	NR	NR	NR	NR	NR	NR	NR	NR	NR	NR

=== Pairwise ===
Team	1	2	3	4	5	6	7	8	9	10	12	13	14	15	16	17	18	19	20	21	22	23	Final
Augustana	32	11	27	12	16	27	30	36	30	26	35	35	37	37	41	39	39	38	38	40	41	40	39
Bemidji State	32	12	48	44	41	42	36	41	40	42	41	40	38	42	41	42	40	40	35	33	31	31	31
Bowling Green	21	49	50	54	58	62	59	61	61	54	60	61	61	61	62	57	53	49	55	56	57	57	56
Ferris State	27	38	47	46	54	58	57	60	57	62	62	63	63	62	59	63	63	63	63	63	63	63	63
Lake Superior State	32	42	38	32	23	44	50	47	46	45	46	47	44	48	47	47	49	53	49	48	45	46	46
Michigan Tech	16	47	45	47	28	36	46	38	35	39	37	35	40	40	38	39	41	42	36	39	36	35	32
Minnesota State	32	31	28	42	36	24	26	37	28	28	28	30	28	29	27	27	28	28	30	36	35	33	34
Northern Michigan	32	48	34	34	62	55	44	49	48	47	48	51	57	56	55	51	55	55	51	47	50	48	48
St. Thomas	26	51	35	57	50	32	31	30	34	30	39	39	33	35	34	31	34	39	44	43	48	47	47

Note: teams ranked in the top-10 automatically qualify for the NCAA tournament. Teams ranked 11-16 can qualify based upon conference tournament results.

== Awards ==
=== CCHA ===
Award		Recipient
Player of the Year		Sam Morton, Minnesota State
Forward of the Year		Sam Morton, Minnesota State
Defenseman of the Year		Kyle Looft, Bemidji State
Goaltender of the Year		Mattias Sholl, Bemidji State
Rookie of the Year		Isaac Gordon, Michigan Tech
Best Defensive Defenseman		Kyle Looft, Bemidji State
Best Defensive Forward		Connor Milburn, Lake Superior State
Best Defensive Forward		Jackson Jutting, Bemidji State
Coach of the Year		Tom Serratore, Bemidji State
All-CCHA Teams
First Team	Position	Second Team
Mattias Sholl, Bemidji State	G	Blake Pietila, Michigan Tech
Kyle Looft, Bemidji State	D	Evan Murr, Minnesota State
Eric Pohlkamp, Bemidji State	D	Josh Zinger, Northern Michigan
Sam Morton, Minnesota State	F	Isaac Gordon, Michigan Tech
Lleyton Roed, Bemidji State	F	Connor Milburn, Lake Superior State
Jared Westcott, Lake Superior State	F	Lucas Wahlin, St. Thomas
Rookie Team	Position	
Cole Moore, Bowling Green	G	
Evan Murr, Minnesota State	D	
Eric Pohlkamp, Bemidji State	D	
Luigi Benincasa, Ferris State	F	
Isaac Gordon, Michigan Tech	F	
John Herrington, Lake Superior State	F	

== 2024 NHL entry draft ==
Round	Pick	Player	College	NHL team
4	111	Chase Pietila	Michigan Tech	Pittsburgh Penguins
6	165	Luke Ashton ^{†}	Minnesota State	Columbus Blue Jackets
7	205	Austin Moline ^{†}	Northern Michigan	Philadelphia Flyers
7	218	Bauer Berry ^{†}	St. Thomas	Edmonton Oilers

† incoming freshman
