= 2023–24 Minnesota State Mavericks men's ice hockey season =

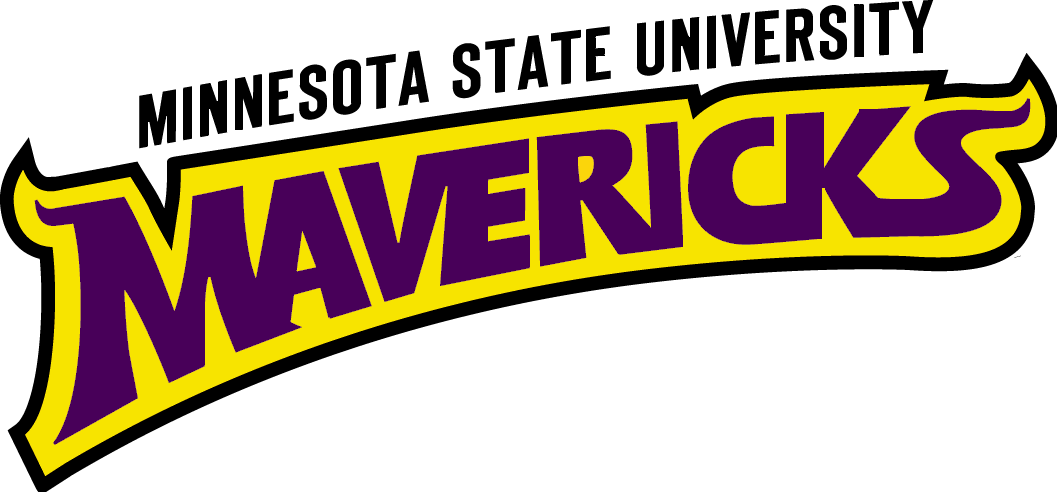
- Conference: 4th CCHA
- Home ice: Mayo Clinic Health System Event Center

Rankings
- USCHO: NR
- USA Hockey: NR

Record
- Overall: 18–15–4
- Conference: 12–10–2
- Home: 10–7–1
- Road: 8–8–3

Coaches and captains
- Head coach: Luke Strand
- Assistant coaches: Troy G. Ward; Keith Paulsen; Cory McCracken
- Captain: Sam Morton
- Alternate captain(s): Tony Malinowski; Jordan Steinmetz; Mason Wheeler

The 2023–24 Minnesota State Mavericks men's ice hockey season was the 55th season of play for the program, 28th at the Division I level, and 3rd in the CCHA. The Mavericks represented Minnesota State University, Mankato in the 2023–24 NCAA Division I men's ice hockey season, played their home games at Mayo Clinic Health System Event Center and were coached by Luke Strand in his 1st season.

== Season ==
Due in no small part to the departure of former head coach Mike Hastings to Wisconsin, Minnesota State saw a mass exodus of players in the offseason. The Mavericks ended up losing the top nine scorers from the previous season, leaving Luke Strand a herculean task ahead of him. To make matters worse, last year's starting goaltender, Keenan Rancier, had to have offseason surgery on his hip and would be unavailable for the star of the season. The team did receive a small bit of good news with Sam Morton having fully recovered from a season-ending knee injury.

Even with circumstances going against them, the Mavericks began the season well, sweeping preseason #10 St. Cloud State at home. Unfortunately, Alex Tracy played inconsistently for the rest of October and the team went winless to finish out the month. Things got a little better once the team settled down but one thing became abundant as the season progressed; while the offense appeared to be operating well, led by Morton, the defense was lacking. Minnesota State had been one of the best teams in recent years in terms of shots against per game. Last season the Mavericks had allowed less than 19 attempts on goal per match but now, with all of the changes that the Mavericks had undergone, MSU was surrendering almost 50% more opportunities per game. While the performances of the two netminders was about the same, the increased shot volume resulted in about half a goal against per game more. The first half of the year saw the team swing between good and bad stretches in even amounts to end up at exactly .500 by the winter break.

After the time off, Minnesota State returned looking like a new team. Tracy and Rancier played about as well as they had all season and helped the team run through January with a 5–1–2 record. By the beginning of February, Minnesota State looked primed to capture its 7th consecutive conference title but that's when the team ran out of gas. Over the final five weeks of the season, The goaltending returned to its early-season form and allowed at least three goals in six of eight games. The offense was unable to compensate and Minnesota State lost five games, all in regulation. On the final weekend of the regular season, MSU still had a chance to finish atop the standings but they were shutout in consecutive games by Bemidji State and fell to 4th.

Tracy was given the starting role in the postseason and fulfilled the assignment by stopping 58 of 60 shots from Northern Michigan. The stout goaltending was more than enough to lead the team to a sweep and a trip to the semifinals. Higher-seeded Michigan Tech awaited the Mavericks in the second round but it looked to be MSU that was the better team. Minnesota State held the lead after the first and second periods but both times Tech was able to tie the match. Adam Eisele gave the Mavs their third lead of the game at the 6-minute mark of the third period and brought upon a furious attack from the Huskies to tie the score. Tracy was unable to stop a penalty shot from tying the game with under 5 minutes to play but neither team was able to get the equalizer and the match seemed destined for overtime. In the waning seconds of the game, Minnesota State won a defensive faceoff but Steven Bellini was unable to clear the puck. A rushed shot from the blueline was stopped by Tracy's pad but deflected up and off the glass. The puck rebounded up and over the net and Jordan Power attempted to knock it out of harm's way with his glove. The Maverick defenseman missed the puck which instead hit him in the helmet and hopped back towards the goal. back towards the goal. Tracy saw the puck at the last moment and appeared to try and head the puck away but it bounced off of his mask and dropped into the goal with just 9 seconds left in the game. Minnesota State was unable to produce a miracle to tie the game and saw their season end on one of the more crazy endings imaginable.

== Departures ==
Player	Position	Nationality	Cause
Cade Borchardt	Forward	United States	Graduation (signed with Kansas City Mavericks)
Andy Carroll	Defenseman	United States	Graduation (signed with Abbotsford Canucks)
Christian Fitzgerald	Forward	Canada	Transferred to Wisconsin
Brendan Furry	Forward	United States	Signed professional contract (Lehigh Valley Phantoms)
Akito Hirose	Defenseman	Canada	Signed professional contract (Vancouver Canucks)
Jake Livingstone	Defenseman	Canada	Signed professional contract (Nashville Predators)
Ondřej Pavel	Forward	Czech Republic	Signed professional contract (Colorado Avalanche)
Ryan Sandelin	Forward	United States	Graduation (signed with Colorado Eagles)
David Silye	Forward	Canada	Transferred to Wisconsin
Simon Tassy	Forward	Canada	Transferred to Wisconsin
Bennett Zmolek	Defenseman	United States	Transferred to North Dakota

== Recruiting ==
Player	Position	Nationality	Age	Notes
Kaden Bohlsen	Forward	United States	22	Willmar, MN; transfer from Omaha
Brian Carrabes	Forward	United States	22	North Andover, MA; transfer from Boston University
Tyler Haskins	Forward	United States	20	Rochester, MN; transfer from Denver
Brandon Koch	Defenseman	United States	24	Hastings, MN; graduate transfer from Air Force
Brett Moravec	Forward	Canada	20	Airdrie, AB
Evan Murr	Defenseman	United States	20	Stillwater, MN
Kade Nielsen	Forward	United States	21	Burnsville, MN
Jordan Power	Defenseman	Canada	22	Ottawa, ON; transfer from Clarkson
Jordan Steinmetz	Forward	United States	24	Chippewa Falls, WI; graduate transfer from St. Lawrence
Jakob Stender	Defenseman	United States	22	Alexandria, MN

== Roster ==
As of September 18, 2023.

No.	Nat.	Player	Class	Pos	Height	Weight	DoB	Hometown	Previous team	NHL rights
3	(United States)	Brandon Koch	Graduate	D	6' 0" (1.83 m)	185 lb (84 kg)	1999-01-18	Hastings, Minnesota	Air Force (AHA)	—
4	(Canada)	Brett Moravec	Freshman	F	5' 10" (1.78 m)	176 lb (80 kg)	2003-02-26	Airdrie, Alberta	Penticton Vees (BCHL)	—
5	(United States)	Mason Wheeler (A)	Sophomore	D	6' 1" (1.85 m)	195 lb (88 kg)	2001-09-29	Inver Grove Heights, Minnesota	Tri-City Storm (USHL)	—
6	(United States)	Sam Morton (C)	Graduate	F	6' 0" (1.83 m)	177 lb (80 kg)	1999-07-28	Lafayette, Colorado	Wenatchee Wild (BCHL)	—
7	(Canada)	Luc Wilson	Sophomore	F	5' 8" (1.73 m)	170 lb (77 kg)	2001-11-22	Duncan, British Columbia	Penticton Vees (BCHL)	—
8	(United States)	Campbell Cichosz	Sophomore	D	6' 0" (1.83 m)	174 lb (79 kg)	2001-08-23	Albert Lea, Minnesota	Anchorage Wolverines (NAHL)	—
9	(United States)	Tanner Edwards	Junior	F	6' 0" (1.83 m)	177 lb (80 kg)	2000-03-11	Anchorage, Alaska	Muskegon Lumberjacks (USHL)	—
10	(United States)	Evan Murr	Freshman	D	5' 10" (1.78 m)	178 lb (81 kg)	2003-02-27	Stillwater, Minnesota	Sioux Falls Stampede (USHL)	—
11	(United States)	Tyler Haskins	Sophomore	F	6' 1" (1.85 m)	170 lb (77 kg)	2003-07-07	Rochester, Minnesota	Denver (NCHC)	—
12	(United States)	Josh Groll	Senior	F	5' 11" (1.8 m)	182 lb (83 kg)	2001-08-09	San Diego, California	Michigan (Big Ten)	—
13	(Canada)	Jordan Power	Freshman	D	6' 1" (1.85 m)	187 lb (85 kg)	2001-07-31	Ottawa, Ontario	Lincoln Stars (USHL)	—
14	(United States)	Kade Nielsen	Freshman	F	5' 9" (1.75 m)	170 lb (77 kg)	2002-08-06	Burnsville, Minnesota	Chippewa Steel (NAHL)	—
15	(United States)	Adam Eisele	Sophomore	F	6' 1" (1.85 m)	190 lb (86 kg)	2001-07-11	Lake Elmo, Minnesota	Penticton Vees (BCHL)	—
18	(United States)	Jakob Stender	Freshman	F	5' 11" (1.8 m)	185 lb (84 kg)	2002-08-07	Alexandria, Minnesota	Fargo Force (USHL)	—
19	(United States)	Will Hillman	Junior	F	6' 2" (1.88 m)	178 lb (81 kg)	2000-11-22	Blaine, Minnesota	Youngstown Phantoms (USHL)	—
20	(Canada)	Connor Gregga	Senior	F	5' 10" (1.78 m)	177 lb (80 kg)	2000-07-24	Markham, Ontario	Coquitlam Express (BCHL)	—
21	(United States)	Lucas Sowder	Graduate	F	5' 11" (1.8 m)	164 lb (74 kg)	1998-11-15	Trinity, Florida	Wenatchee Wild (BCHL)	—
22	(Canada)	Steven Bellini	Junior	D	5' 11" (1.8 m)	171 lb (78 kg)	2000-05-23	Sault Ste. Marie, Ontario	Tri-City Storm (USHL)	—
24	(United States)	Zach Krajnik	Junior	F	5' 11" (1.8 m)	174 lb (79 kg)	1999-05-13	Eagle River, Alaska	Kenai River Brown Bears (NAHL)	—
25	(United States)	Brenden Olson	Junior	F	6' 1" (1.85 m)	170 lb (77 kg)	2000-10-18	Eau Claire, Wisconsin	Sioux City Musketeers (USHL)	—
26	(United States)	Kaden Bohlsen	Senior	F	6' 3" (1.91 m)	192 lb (87 kg)	2001-01-10	Willmar, Minnesota	Fargo Force (USHL)	—
27	(United States)	Tony Malinowski (A)	Senior	D	6' 5" (1.96 m)	205 lb (93 kg)	1999-10-15	Clarkston, Michigan	Des Moines Buccaneers (USHL)	—
28	(United States)	Brian Carrabes	Sophomore	F	5' 10" (1.78 m)	170 lb (77 kg)	2001-08-01	North Andover, Massachusetts	Sioux City Musketeers (USHL)	—
29	(United States)	Jordan Steinmetz (A)	Graduate	F	5' 8" (1.73 m)	170 lb (77 kg)	1999-01-10	Chippewa Falls, Wisconsin	Sioux City Musketeers (USHL)	—
32	(United States)	Andrew Miller	Junior (RS)	G	6' 0" (1.83 m)	177 lb (80 kg)	2000-02-10	Boulder, Colorado	Fargo Force (USHL)	—
33	(United States)	Alex Tracy	Sophomore	G	6' 0" (1.83 m)	187 lb (85 kg)	2001-05-04	Chicago, Illinois	Sioux City Musketeers (USHL)	—
35	(Canada)	Keenan Rancier	Junior	G	6' 2" (1.88 m)	184 lb (83 kg)	2000-06-21	Victoria, British Columbia	Minot Minotauros (NAHL)	—

== Standings ==
2023–24 Central Collegiate Hockey Association Standings
	Conference record										Overall record					
	GP	W	L	T	OTW	OTL	SW	PTS	GF	GA	GP	W	L	T	GF	GA
Bemidji State †	24	15	7	2	2	1	2	48	82	64	38	20	16	2	117	111
St. Thomas	24	12	11	1	0	2	0	39	68	62	37	15	20	2	97	105
#19 Michigan Tech*	24	12	10	2	1	2	0	39	63	54	40	19	15	6	109	102
Minnesota State	24	12	10	2	2	1	1	38	73	62	37	18	15	4	111	96
Northern Michigan	24	10	10	4	1	1	2	36	57	67	34	12	16	6	83	105
Bowling Green	24	11	12	1	1	1	1	35	60	69	36	13	22	1	86	116
Lake Superior State	24	11	12	1	2	2	0	34	79	73	38	17	20	1	114	113
Ferris State	24	6	17	1	3	2	1	19	49	80	36	10	24	2	83	125
Augustana ^	0	0	0	0	0	0	0	0	0	0	34	12	18	4	90	105
Championship: March 22, 2024 † indicates conference regular season champion (MacNaughton Cup) * indicates conference tournament champion (Mason Cup)^ Augustana is playing a transition schedule of 16 games against conference opponents that are not counted in the standings Rankings: USCHO.com Top 20 Poll

== Schedule and results ==
Date	Time	Opponent^{#}	Rank^{#}	Site	TV	Decision	Result	Attendance	Record
Exhibition
October 7	6:07 pm	at Omaha*		Mayo Clinic Health System Event Center • Mankato, Minnesota (Exhibition)	FloHockey	Miller	L 0–1	4,145	
Regular Season
October 13	7:07 pm	#10 St. Cloud State*		Mayo Clinic Health System Event Center • Mankato, Minnesota	FloHockey	Tracy	W 3–2 ^{OT}	4,398	1–0–0
October 14	6:07 pm	#10 St. Cloud State*		Mayo Clinic Health System Event Center • Mankato, Minnesota	FloHockey	Tracy	W 5–1	4,767	2–0–0
October 20	7:07 pm	Massachusetts*	#19	Mayo Clinic Health System Event Center • Mankato, Minnesota	FloHockey	Tracy	L 3–6	4,233	2–1–0
October 21	6:07 pm	Massachusetts*	#19	Mayo Clinic Health System Event Center • Mankato, Minnesota	FloHockey	Tracy	L 0–1	4,543	2–2–0
October 27	7:07 pm	at #4 North Dakota*		Ralph Engelstad Arena • Grand Forks, North Dakota	Midco	Tracy	L 2–6	11,604	2–3–0
October 28	6:07 pm	at #4 North Dakota*		Ralph Engelstad Arena • Grand Forks, North Dakota	Midco	Tracy	T 2–2 ^{OT}	11,646	2–3–1
November 10	6:07 pm	at Ferris State		Ewigleben Arena • Big Rapids, Michigan	FloHockey	Tracy	W 6–2	1,537	3–3–1 (1–0–0)
November 11	5:07 pm	at Ferris State		Ewigleben Arena • Big Rapids, Michigan	FloHockey	Tracy	W 3–2 ^{OT}	—	4–3–1 (2–0–0)
November 17	7:07 pm	Bemidji State		Mayo Clinic Health System Event Center • Mankato, Minnesota	FloHockey	Tracy	W 5–1	4,941	5–3–1 (3–0–0)
November 18	6:07 pm	Bemidji State		Mayo Clinic Health System Event Center • Mankato, Minnesota	FloHockey	Tracy	L 6–7	5,008	5–4–1 (3–1–0)
November 24	7:07 pm	Michigan Tech		Mayo Clinic Health System Event Center • Mankato, Minnesota	FloHockey	Rancier	L 2–3 ^{OT}	3,732	5–5–1 (3–2–0)
November 25	6:07 pm	Michigan Tech		Mayo Clinic Health System Event Center • Mankato, Minnesota	FloHockey	Tracy	L 2–3	4,023	5–6–1 (3–3–0)
December 1	6:07 pm	at Lake Superior State		Taffy Abel Arena • Sault Ste. Marie, Michigan	FloHockey	Tracy	T 2–2 ^{SOW}	930	5–6–2 (3–3–1)
December 2	5:07 pm	at Lake Superior State		Taffy Abel Arena • Sault Ste. Marie, Michigan	FloHockey	Rancier	W 4–3	892	6–6–2 (4–3–1)
December 8	7:07 pm	St. Thomas		Mayo Clinic Health System Event Center • Mankato, Minnesota	FloHockey	Tracy	W 3–1	4,557	7–6–2 (5–3–1)
December 9	6:07 pm	at St. Thomas		St. Thomas Ice Arena • Mendota Heights, Minnesota	FloHockey	Rancier	L 1–2	1,010	7–7–2 (5–4–1)
December 15	6:07 pm	at Rensselaer*		Houston Field House • Troy, New York	ESPN+	Tracy	L 3–4 ^{OT}	1,477	7–8–2
December 16	5:07 pm	at Rensselaer*		Houston Field House • Troy, New York	ESPN+	Rancier	W 4–2	1,635	8–8–2
January 5	7:07 pm	at Augustana		Denny Sanford Premier Center • Sioux Falls, South Dakota	FloHockey, Midco	Tracy	T 3–3 ^{OT}	3,211	8–8–3
January 6	6:07 pm	at Augustana		Denny Sanford Premier Center • Sioux Falls, South Dakota	FloHockey, Midco	Rancier	W 2–1	3,363	9–8–3
January 12	7:07 pm	Ferris State		Mayo Clinic Health System Event Center • Mankato, Minnesota	FloHockey	Rancier	W 4–2	4,244	10–8–3 (6–4–1)
January 13	6:07 pm	Ferris State		Mayo Clinic Health System Event Center • Mankato, Minnesota	FloHockey	Tracy	W 4–0	4,615	11–8–3 (7–4–1)
January 19	6:07 pm	at Bowling Green		Slater Family Ice Arena • Bowling Green, Ohio	FloHockey	Rancier	L 3–4	2,313	11–9–3 (7–5–1)
January 20	6:07 pm	at Bowling Green		Slater Family Ice Arena • Bowling Green, Ohio	FloHockey	Tracy	W 4–1	2,812	12–9–3 (8–5–1)
January 26	7:07 pm	Northern Michigan		Mayo Clinic Health System Event Center • Mankato, Minnesota	FloHockey	Tracy	T 2–2 ^{SOL}	4,667	12–9–4 (8–5–2)
January 27	6:07 pm	Northern Michigan		Mayo Clinic Health System Event Center • Mankato, Minnesota	FloHockey	Tracy	W 4–0	4,981	13–9–4 (9–5–2)
February 2	7:07 pm	at St. Thomas		St. Thomas Ice Arena • Mendota Heights, Minnesota	FloHockey	Tracy	W 4–3 ^{OT}	1,038	14–9–4 (10–5–2)
February 3	6:07 pm	St. Thomas		Mayo Clinic Health System Event Center • Mankato, Minnesota	FloHockey	Tracy	L 2–4	4,973	14–10–4 (10–6–2)
February 9	6:07 pm	at Michigan Tech		MacInnes Student Ice Arena • Houghton, Michigan	FloHockey	Tracy	L 1–3	3,704	14–11–4 (10–7–2)
February 10	4:07 pm	at Michigan Tech		MacInnes Student Ice Arena • Houghton, Michigan	FloHockey	Tracy	W 4–2	3,773	15–11–4 (11–7–2)
February 23	7:07 pm	Lake Superior State		Mayo Clinic Health System Event Center • Mankato, Minnesota	FloHockey	Rancier	L 3–4	4,681	15–12–4 (11–8–2)
February 24	6:07 pm	Lake Superior State		Mayo Clinic Health System Event Center • Mankato, Minnesota	FloHockey	Rancier	W 4–3	4,935	16–12–4 (12–8–2)
March 1	7:07 pm	at Bemidji State		Sanford Center • Bemidji, Minnesota	FloHockey	Tracy	L 0–6	2,522	16–13–4 (12–9–2)
March 2	6:07 pm	at Bemidji State		Sanford Center • Bemidji, Minnesota	FloHockey	Rancier	L 0–2	2,402	16–14–4 (12–10–2)
CCHA Tournament
March 8	7:07 pm	Northern Michigan*		Mayo Clinic Health System Event Center • Mankato, Minnesota (Quarterfinal Game 1)	FloHockey	Tracy	W 2–1	3,084	17–14–4
March 9	6:07 pm	Northern Michigan*		Mayo Clinic Health System Event Center • Mankato, Minnesota (Quarterfinal Game 2)	FloHockey	Tracy	W 6–1	3,494	18–14–4
March 16	4:07 pm	at Michigan Tech*		MacInnes Student Ice Arena • Houghton, Michigan (Semifinal)	FloHockey	Tracy	L 3–4	3,527	18–15–4
*Non-conference game. ^{#}Rankings from USCHO.com Poll. All times are in Central Time. Source:

== Scoring statistics ==
Name	Position	Games	Goals	Assists	Points	PIM
Sam Morton	LW	37	24	10	34	10
Lucas Sowder	LW	33	13	15	28	16
Evan Murr	D	37	6	20	26	14
Adam Eisele	F	37	8	15	23	16
Brian Carrabes	F	36	10	12	22	6
Kaden Bohlsen	C	37	11	10	21	52
Josh Groll	F	34	7	13	20	15
Luc Wilson	F	36	7	12	19	14
Brandon Koch	D	34	1	13	14	18
Steven Bellini	D	31	3	8	11	20
Jordan Steinmetz	F	32	2	9	11	10
Brett Moravec	F	27	4	4	8	10
Zach Krajnik	C	27	1	6	7	2
Jordan Power	D	31	1	6	7	26
Tyler Haskins	F	18	4	2	6	2
Will Hillman	F	36	2	3	5	12
Mason Wheeler	D	37	1	4	5	18
Brenden Olson	D	23	3	1	4	10
Connor Gregga	F	28	2	2	4	8
Campbell Cichosz	D	36	1	3	4	8
Tony Malinowski	D	13	0	4	4	4
Jakob Stender	D	27	0	4	4	4
Alex Tracy	G	28	0	1	1	0
Tanner Edwards	C/LW	5	0	0	0	4
Kade Nielsen	F	8	0	0	0	0
Keenan Rancier	G	12	0	0	0	0
Total			111	175	286	307

== Goaltending statistics ==
Name	Games	Minutes	Wins	Losses	Ties	Goals against	Saves	Shut outs	SV %	GAA
Alex Tracy	30	1584:17	13	10	4	66	671	2	.910	2.50
Keenan Rancier	13	663:59	5	5	0	27	273	0	.910	2.44
Empty Net	-	11:38	-	-	-	3	-	-	-	-
Total	37	2259:54	18	15	4	96	944	2	.908	2.55

== Rankings ==
Poll	Week																										
Poll	Pre	1	2	3	4	5	6	7	8	9	10	11	12	13	14	15	16	17	18	19	20	21	22	23	24	25	26 (Final)
USCHO.com	NR	NR	19	NR	NR	NR	NR	NR	NR	NR	NR	-	NR	NR	NR	NR	NR	NR	NR	NR	NR	NR	NR	NR	NR	–	NR
USA Hockey	NR	NR	20	NR	NR	NR	NR	NR	NR	NR	NR	NR	-	NR	NR	NR	NR	NR	NR	NR	NR	NR	NR	NR	NR	NR	NR

Note: USCHO did not release a poll in weeks 11 and 25.
Note: USA Hockey did not release a poll in week 12.

== Awards and honors ==
Player	Award	Ref
Sam Morton	CCHA Player of the Year	
Sam Morton	CCHA Forward of the Year	
Sam Morton	CCHA First Team	
Evan Murr	CCHA Second Team	
Evan Murr	CCHA Rookie Team	

== 2024 NHL entry draft ==
Round	Pick	Player	NHL team
6	165	Luke Ashton ^{†}	Columbus Blue Jackets

† incoming freshman
