= Lleyton Roed =

American ice hockey player (born 2002)

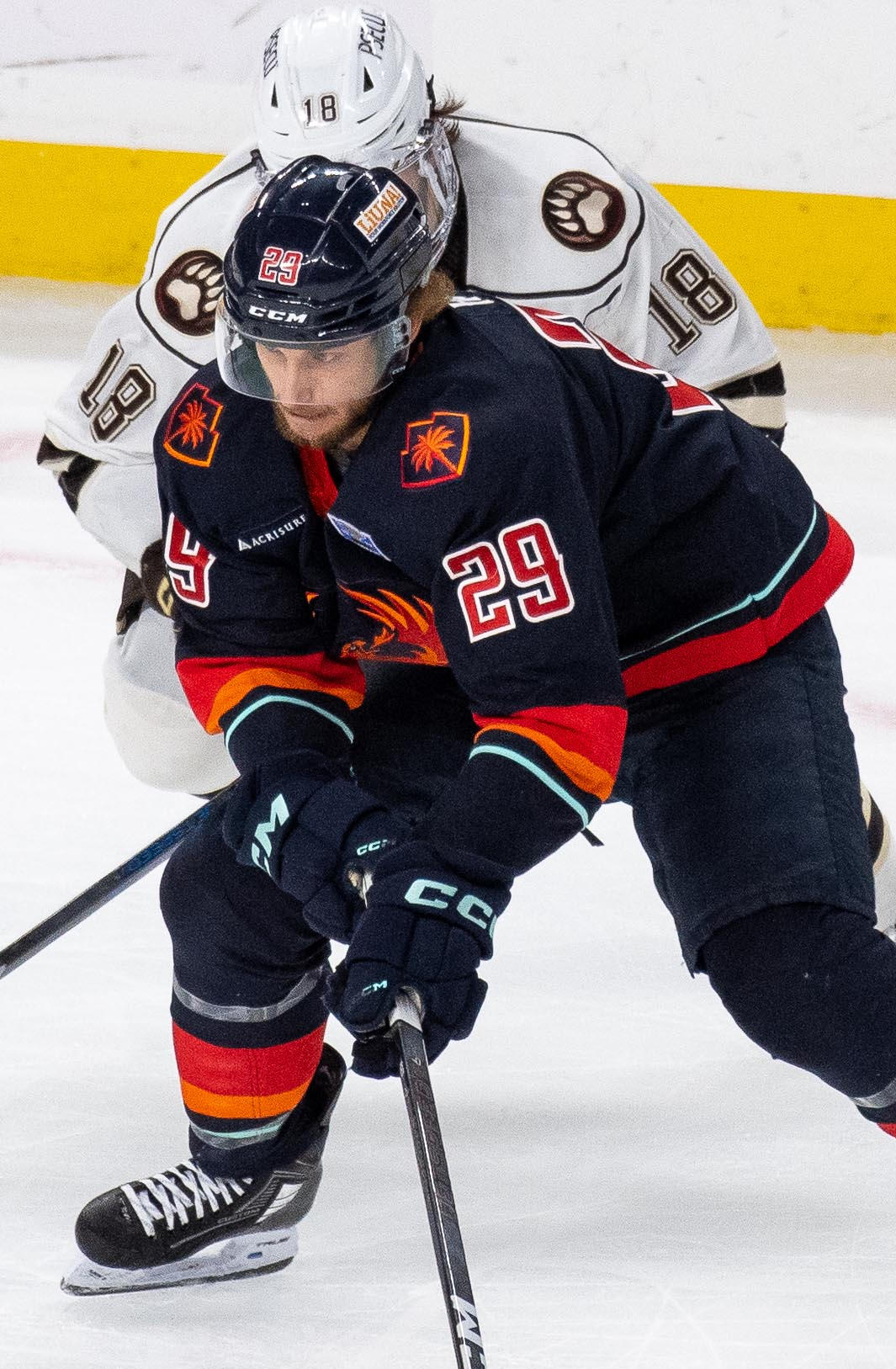
- Roed with the Coachella Valley Firebirds in 2024
- Born: August 8, 2002 (age 23) White Bear Lake, Minnesota, U.S.
- Height: 6 ft 0 in (183 cm)
- Weight: 179 lb (81 kg; 12 st 11 lb)
- Position: Winger
- Shoots: Left
- NHL team (P) Cur. team: Seattle Kraken; Coachella Valley Firebirds (AHL)
- NHL draft: Undrafted
- Playing career: 2024–present

Lleyton Roed (born August 8, 2002) is an American professional ice hockey left wing for the Coachella Valley Firebirds of the American Hockey League (AHL) while under contract to the Seattle Kraken of the National Hockey League (NHL).

== Playing career ==
Roed played minor hockey with his school, White Bear Lake Area High School.

Roed was selected in the tenth round, 154th overall, by the Tri-City Storm in the United States Hockey League (USHL) Phase II Draft.

On December 23, 2020, Roed committed to Bemidji State University's hockey team, the Beavers, which competes in the Central Collegiate Hockey Association (CCHA). On January 26, 2024, following the 2023–24 season, Roed was nominated for the Hobey Baker Award, given to the National Collegiate Athletic Association (NCAA)'s best hockey player.

On March 27, 2024, Roed signed a two-year, entry-level contract with the Seattle Kraken. He was sent to the Kraken's American Hockey League (AHL) affiliate, the Coachella Valley Firebirds. He scored his first professional goal with the Firebirds on April 7, 2024, his goal being the fifth goal of a 7–2 victory against the Abbotsford Canucks.

== Personal life ==
Roed was born on August 8, 2002, to parents Peter and Kelly. Peter Roed played professional hockey in the ECHL, AHL, Deutsche Eishockey Liga, and United Hockey League.

== Career statistics ==
			Regular season					Playoffs
Season	Team	League	GP	G	A	Pts	PIM	GP	G	A	Pts	PIM
2020–21	Minnesota Magicians	NAHL	14	6	7	13	19	9	4	9	13	0
2020–21	Tri–City Storm	USHL	3	0	0	0	0	—	—	—	—	—
2021–22	Tri-City Storm	USHL	60	21	19	41	48	5	1	0	1	0
2022–23	Bemidji State University	CCHA	36	13	18	31	6	—	—	—	—	—
2023–24	Bemidji State University	CCHA	38	14	16	30	16	—	—	—	—	—
2023–24	Coachella Valley Firebirds	AHL	5	1	1	2	2	5	1	0	1	0
2024–25	Coachella Valley Firebirds	AHL	56	13	13	26	19	—	—	—	—	—
2025–26	Coachella Valley Firebirds	AHL	65	11	27	38	16	12	3	4	7	6
AHL totals			126	25	41	66	37	17	4	4	8	6
