= Clarkson Golden Knights ice hockey =

Clarkson Golden Knights ice hockey may refer to either of the ice hockey teams that represent Clarkson University:

- Clarkson Golden Knights men's ice hockey
- Clarkson Golden Knights women's ice hockey
