= Blake Pietila (ice hockey, born 2000) =

American ice hockey player

- Born: January 27, 2000 (age 26) Howell, Michigan, U.S.
- Height: 5 ft 11 in (180 cm)
- Weight: 201 lb (91 kg; 14 st 5 lb)
- Position: Goaltender
- Catches: Left
- EIHL team Former teams: Fife Flyers; Kalmar HC
- NHL draft: Undrafted
- Playing career: 2024–present

Blake Pietila (born January 27, 2000) is an American professional ice hockey goaltender for the Fife Flyers of the Elite Ice Hockey League (EIHL). He was named to the All-American team during his collegiate career with Michigan Tech in 2023.

== Playing career ==
After beginning his junior career with local Michigan teams, Pietila committed to Michigan Tech along with his twin brother, Logan. Because he wouldn't begin his tenure until the fall of 2019, Pietila continued his junior career in the interim. He joined the Cedar Rapids RoughRiders in 2017, first sharing the net with Jiri Patera. After a mediocre first season, Pietila took control of the cage in his second year and led the RoughRiders to an excellent regular season though they flamed out in the second round.

Once he arrived in Houghton, Pietila found himself relegated to spot duty as he acclimated to the college game. He appeared in 6 games as a freshman while Matt Jurusik served as the team's starter. With COVID-19 causing a severe disruption in the country, it was unknown as to whether Pietila would get a chance to win the job as a sophomore. After a delay, the college hockey season began in 2020 and with last season backup, Robbie Beydoun, having transferred to Wisconsin, Pietila was the incumbent in goal but had to battle senior transfer Mark Sinclair for the job. Despite the ongoing Covid problems, Pietila ended up playing the majority of the minutes and posted outstanding numbers for the Huskies. At the end of the season Tech had a chance to earn an NCAA tournament appearance, however, the team ended up losing the last 4 games and were left out of the tournament.

For his junior season, Pietila played all but one game and, though his numbers declined slightly, Tech had an even better season. Pietila set a program record with 7 shutouts during the season but his exploits couldn't help the Huskies overcome Minnesota Duluth in the tournament as his team was unable to score. In 2022–23, Michigan Tech had trouble scoring all season. As a result, the team relied even more heavily on Pietila but he up to the challenge. While breaking his program with 10 shutouts during the season, Pietila was named as the CCHA Player of the Year and a first team All-American. He led his team back to the tournament, however, the Huskies were completely dominated by Penn State and set a record for futility by losing 0–8, the largest shutout defeat in NCAA tournament history. Pietila returned for a fifth season and was named as an alternate captain, an exceeding rare honor for a goaltender. While his numbers weren't quite as good as they had been previously, he got stronger as the year went on and led the team back to the NCAA tournament for the third consecutive year. He finished his college career as the all-time leader in wins (76) and shutouts (24) for Michigan Tech.

At the conclusion of his collegiate career, Pietila embarked on his professional career to end the 2023–24 season, by signing as an undrafted free agent to an amateur tryout contract with the Cleveland Monsters of the AHL on April 5, 2024.

== Career statistics ==
			Regular season									Playoffs
Season	Team	League	GP	W	L	T/OT	MIN	GA	SO	GAA	SV%	GP	W	L	MIN	GA	SO	GAA	SV%
2017–18	Cedar Rapids RoughRiders	USHL	32	13	11	2	1,725	87	1	3.03	.903	—	—	—	—	—	—	—	—
2018–19	Cedar Rapids RoughRiders	USHL	47	30	13	4	2,794	107	5	2.30	.912	6	3	3	—	—	—	3.43	.850
2019–20	Michigan Tech	WCHA	6	0	3	0	185	10	0	3.24	.868	—	—	—	—	—	—	—	—
2020–21	Michigan Tech	WCHA	24	14	9	0	1,394	42	3	1.81	.934	—	—	—	—	—	—	—	—
2021–22	Michigan Tech	CCHA	37	21	13	2	2,195	70	7	1.91	.918	—	—	—	—	—	—	—	—
2022–23	Michigan Tech	CCHA	37	23	11	3	2,174	78	10	2.15	.924	—	—	—	—	—	—	—	—
2023–24	Michigan Tech	CCHA	37	18	13	6	2,216	88	4	2.38	.917	—	—	—	—	—	—	—	—
NCAA totals			141	76	49	11	8,164	288	24	2.12	.921	—	—	—	—	—	—	—	—

== Awards and honours ==
Award	Year
College
All-CCHA Second Team	2021–22, 2023–24
All-CCHA First Team	2022–23
AHCA West First Team All-American	2022–23

Awards and achievements
Preceded by Dryden McKay	CCHA Player of the Year; 2022–23	Succeeded by Sam Morton
Preceded by Dryden McKay	CCHA Goaltender of the Year; 2022–23	Succeeded by Mattias Sholl
