= MacInnes Student Ice Arena =

Ice sports arena in Houghton, Michigan

John J. MacInnes Student Ice Arena
- JMSIA or The Mac
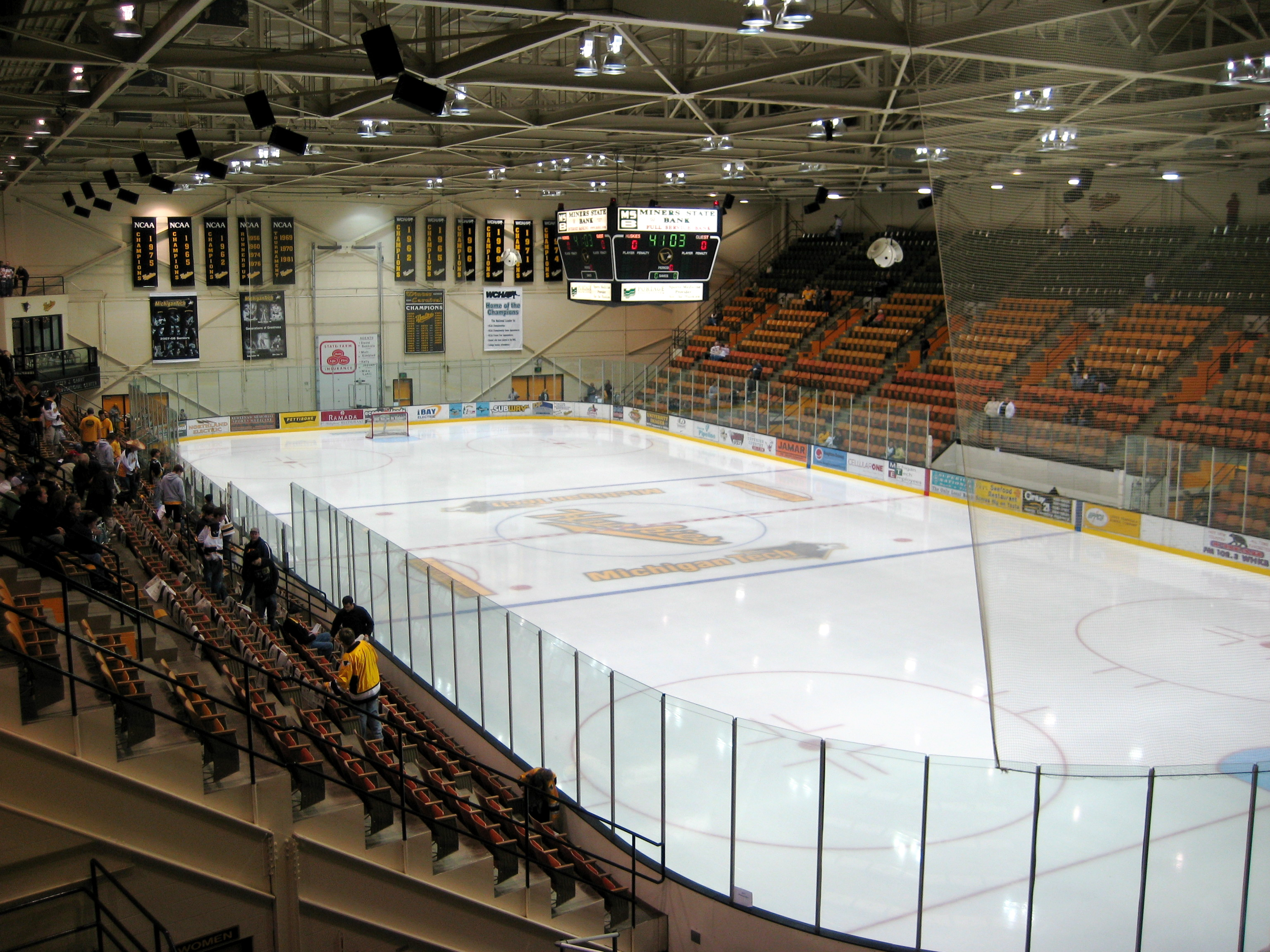
- Interactive map of John J. MacInnes Student Ice Arena
- Former names: Student Ice Arena
- Location: Michigan Tech Univ. Houghton, MI 49931
- Coordinates: 47°06′45″N 88°32′45″W
- Owner: Michigan Technological University
- Operator: Michigan Technological University
- Capacity: 4,466
- Surface: 200' x 85' (hockey)

Construction
- Opened: January 14, 1972
- Cost: $2.6 million

Tenant
- Michigan Tech Huskies men's ice hockey (1972-present)

John J. MacInnes Student Ice Arena is a 4,200-capacity hockey arena in Houghton, Michigan. It is home to the Michigan Tech Huskies men's ice hockey team. It is named for John J. MacInnes, head coach of the Huskies from 1956 to 1983, who was one of the most successful coaches in the history of college hockey with a record of 555-295-39.

In addition to hockey, the arena is used for Spring Commencement ceremonies. The arena's original Wurlitzer organ was used during the Commencement ceremonies, until it was removed during the 2009 renovations.

In 2008, the original wooden seats were replaced with plastic seats. Renovations continued in 2009 with the addition of 12 private suites at the west end of the arena. An office renovated in 2010 became the 13th suite. The design for the renovations were completed by the renowned architecture firm Rossetti Architects, a Michigan-based company. The 10 smaller center suites are leased by the season, and the larger three corner suites are game-by-game rentals.

In 2013, the center-hung fixed digit scoreboard was replaced with a new Mitsubishi Electric video scoreboard featuring four 14-by-8-foot (4.3 by 2.4 m) LED video screens.

== Traditions ==
The John MacInnes Student Ice Arena is home to many traditions. The oldest and by far the most well known is the Copper Country Anthem. The tradition was started as an insult to Polka music that was popular at the time. The song Blue Skirt Waltz was taken and slowed down as a bastardization of the song, people rose from their seats and began to sway. From then on, the Copper Country Anthem was played and people continue to stand and sway during the second intermission. Also the Huskies Pep Band plays "In Heaven There Is No Beer" in which many extra verses have been added over the years, including references to snow, referees, sex, and marijuana. The student section, Mitch's Misfits, known to be fans of college hockey, stand throughout the game in support of the team.

== Panorama ==
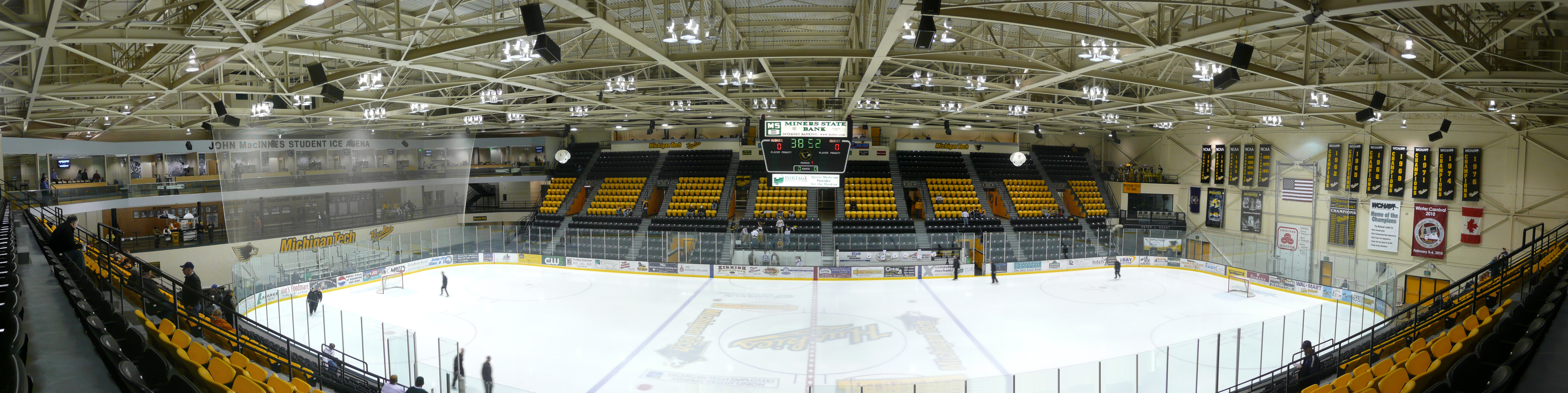
