= 2025–26 Minnesota State Mavericks men's ice hockey season =

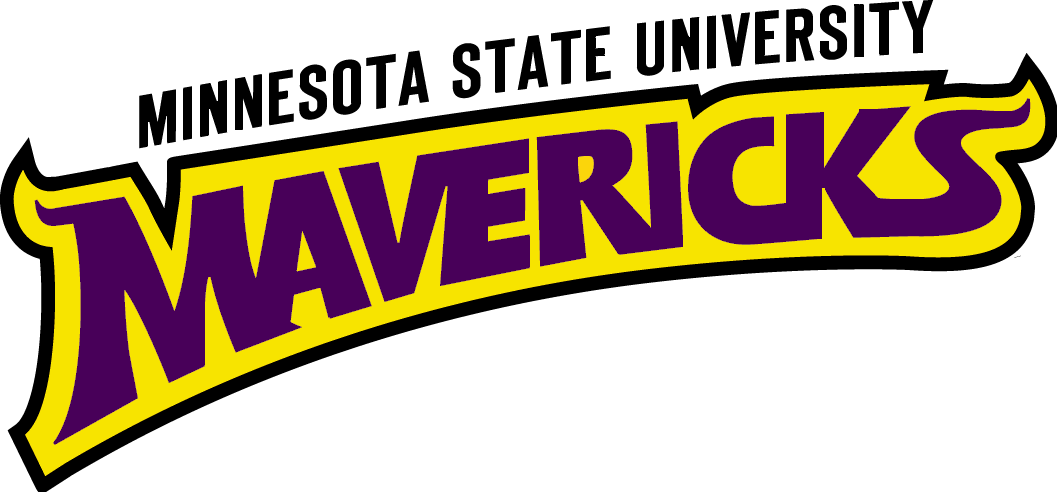

CCHA, Champion NCAA Tournament, Regional Semifinal
- Conference: 1st CCHA
- Home ice: Mayo Clinic Health System Event Center

Rankings
- USCHO: #14
- USA Hockey: #14

Record
- Overall: 22–11–7
- Conference: 14–7–5
- Home: 12–5–3
- Road: 9–4–4
- Neutral: 1–2–0

Coaches and captains
- Head coach: Luke Strand
- Assistant coaches: Troy G. Ward; Keith Paulsen; Cory McCracken
- Captain: Mason Wheeler
- Alternate captain(s): Luigi Benincasa; Campbell Cichosz; Evan Murr; Finlay Williams

The 2025–26 Minnesota State Mavericks men's ice hockey season was the 57th season of play for the program, 30th at the Division I level, and 5th in the CCHA. The Mavericks represented Minnesota State University, Mankato in the 2025–26 NCAA Division I men's ice hockey season, played their home games at Mayo Clinic Health System Event Center and were coached by Luke Strand in his third season.

== Departures ==
Player	Position	Nationality	Cause
Cade Alami	Defenseman	United States	Graduation (signed with Tahoe Knight Monsters)
Luke Ashton	Defenseman	Canada	Transferred to Cornell
Steven Bellini	Defenseman	United States	Graduation (signed with Asiago Hockey 1935)
Kaden Bohlsen	Forward	United States	Graduation (signed with Calgary Wranglers)
Brian Carrabes	Forward	United States	Graduation (signed with Adirondack Thunder)
Adam Eisele	Forward	United States	Transferred to Ohio State
Josh Groll	Forward	United States	Graduation (signed with Fort Wayne Komets)
Tyler Haskins	Forward	United States	Transferred to Mercyhurst
Will Hillman	Forward	United States	Graduation (signed with Toledo Walleye)
Zach Krajnik	Forward	United States	Graduation (signed with Savannah Ghost Pirates)
Andrew Miller	Goaltender	United States	Graduation (retired)
Brett Moravec	Forward	Canada	Signed professional contract (Indy Fuel)
Kade Nielsen	Forward	United States	Left program (retired)
Brenden Olson	Defenseman	United States	Graduation (signed with HC Nové Zámky)
Rhett Pitlick	Forward	United States	Graduation (signed with Bakersfield Condors)
Jordan Power	Defenseman	Canada	Graduation (signed with Greenville Swamp Rabbits)
Eli Pulver	Goaltender	Canada	Transferred to Wisconsin
Sam Rice	Forward	United States	Left program (retired)
Luc Wilson	Forward	Canada	Transferred to Rensselaer

== Recruiting ==
Player	Position	Nationality	Age	Notes
Max Beckford	Goaltender	Canada	22	London, ON; transfer from Bentley
Rylan Bonkowski	Defenseman	Canada	19	Richmond, BC
Jacob Conrad	Defenseman	United States	23	Green Bay, WI; transfer from Lake Superior State
Fēlikss Gavars	Forward	Latvia	23	Riga, LAT; transfer from St. Lawrence
Easton Hewson	Defenseman	Canada	20	Edmonton, AB
Liam Hupka	Defenseman	United States	20	Minneapolis, MN
Mason LeBel	Forward	United States	21	South Bend, IN
Tristan Lemyre	Forward	United States	24	Mirabel, QC; transfer from Western Michigan
Charlie Lurie	Forward	United States	22	Minnetonka, MN; transfer from Omaha
Reid Morich	Forward	United States	20	Scottsdale, AZ
Jordan Ronn	Forward	United States	20	Champlin, MN
Sawyer Scholl	Forward	United States	23	Green Bay, WI; transfer from Wisconsin
Jack Smith	Forward	United States	23	St. Cloud, MN; transfer from Minnesota Duluth; selected 102nd overall in 2020
Ean Somoza	Forward	United States	22	Thousand Oaks, CA; transfer from Western Michigan
Bryce Strand	Defenseman	United States	21	Green Bay, WI
Liam Watkins	Forward	Canada	21	Okotoks, AB; transfer from Omaha
Alexander Zetterberg	Forward	Sweden	19	Sundsvall, SWE; transfer from Boston University

== Roster ==
As of August 24, 2024.

No.	Nat.	Player	Class	Pos	Height	Weight	DoB	Hometown	Previous team	NHL rights
4	(United States)	Jacob Conrad	Sophomore (RS)	D	5' 11" (1.8 m)	180 lb (82 kg)	2002-05-18	Green Bay, Wisconsin	Lake Superior State (CCHA)	—
5	(United States)	Mason Wheeler (C)	Junior	D	6' 1" (1.85 m)	195 lb (88 kg)	2001-09-29	Inver Grove Heights, Minnesota	Tri-City Storm (USHL)	—
7	(United States)	Bryce Strand	Freshman	D	5' 9" (1.75 m)	165 lb (75 kg)	2004-02-10	Green Bay, Wisconsin	Philadelphia Rebels (NAHL)	—
8	(United States)	Campbell Cichosz (A)	Senior	D	6' 0" (1.83 m)	174 lb (79 kg)	2001-08-23	Albert Lea, Minnesota	Anchorage Wolverines (NAHL)	—
9	(Canada)	Luigi Benincasa (A)	Junior	F	5' 9" (1.75 m)	159 lb (72 kg)	2002-10-07	Edmonton, Alberta	Ferris State (CCHA)	—
10	(United States)	Evan Murr (A)	Junior	D	5' 10" (1.78 m)	178 lb (81 kg)	2003-02-27	Stillwater, Minnesota	Sioux Falls Stampede (USHL)	—
11	(United States)	Jordan Ronn	Freshman	F	6' 10" (2.08 m)	176 lb (80 kg)	2005-06-09	Champlin, Minnesota	Fargo Force (USHL)	—
12	(Sweden)	Alex Zetterberg	Sophomore	F	5' 8" (1.73 m)	163 lb (74 kg)	2006-04-27	Sundsvall, Sweden	Boston University (HEA)	—
13	(Canada)	Tristan Lemyre	Senior	F	5' 10" (1.78 m)	170 lb (77 kg)	2001-01-15	Mirabel, Quebec	Western Michigan (NCHC)	—
14	(United States)	Mason LeBel	Freshman	F	6' 3" (1.91 m)	194 lb (88 kg)	2004-05-06	South Bend, Indiana	St. Cloud Norsemen (NAHL)	—
16	(Canada)	Jacob Bonkowski	Freshman	F	6' 1" (1.85 m)	170 lb (77 kg)	2003-08-25	Richmond, British Columbia	Coquitlam Express (BCHL)	—
17	(United States)	Ean Somoza	Junior	F	6' 3" (1.91 m)	188 lb (85 kg)	2003-02-08	Thousand Oaks, California	Western Michigan (NCHC)	—
18	(United States)	Jakob Stender	Junior	F	5' 11" (1.8 m)	185 lb (84 kg)	2002-08-07	Alexandria, Minnesota	Fargo Force (USHL)	—
20	(United States)	Jack Smith	Senior	F	6' 0" (1.83 m)	190 lb (86 kg)	2002-07-06	St. Cloud, Minnesota	Minnesota Duluth (NCHC)	MTL, 102nd overall 2020
21	(Canada)	Fin Williams (A)	Junior	F	6' 1" (1.85 m)	186 lb (84 kg)	2003-04-21	North Vancouver, British Columbia	Notre Dame (Big Ten)	—
22	(Canada)	Liam Hupka	Freshman	D	6' 3" (1.91 m)	190 lb (86 kg)	2005-06-27	Minneapolis, Minnesota	Sioux City Musketeers (USHL)	—
23	(United States)	Sawyer Scholl	Junior	F	6' 2" (1.88 m)	190 lb (86 kg)	2002-02-14	Medford, Wisconsin	Wisconsin (Big Ten)	—
24	(United States)	Charlie Lurie	Junior	F	5' 11" (1.8 m)	187 lb (85 kg)	2003-03-11	Minnetonka, Minnesota	Omaha (NCHC)	—
25	(Latvia)	Fēlikss Gavars	Senior	F	5' 11" (1.8 m)	184 lb (83 kg)	2002-05-15	Riga, Latvia	St. Lawrence (ECAC)	—
26	(Canada)	Rylan Bonkowski	Freshman	D	5' 11" (1.8 m)	170 lb (77 kg)	2006-04-26	Richmond, British Columbia	Tri-City Storm (USHL)	—
27	(Canada)	Liam Watkins	Sophomore	F	6' 1" (1.85 m)	201 lb (91 kg)	2004-07-13	Okotoks, Alberta	Omaha (NCHC)	—
28	(United States)	Easton Hewson	Freshman	D	6' 4" (1.93 m)	220 lb (100 kg)	2005-06-08	Edmonton, Alberta	Waterloo Black Hawks (USHL)	—
31	(United States)	Matthew Syverson	Junior	G	6' 4" (1.93 m)	185 lb (84 kg)	2003-04-22	Apple Valley, Minnesota	Lindenwood (NCAA)	—
33	(United States)	Alex Tracy	Senior	G	6' 0" (1.83 m)	187 lb (85 kg)	2001-05-04	Chicago, Illinois	Sioux City Musketeers (USHL)	—
35	(Canada)	Max Beckford	Sophomore	G	6' 2" (1.88 m)	205 lb (93 kg)	2003-01-30	London, Ontario	Bentley (AHA)	—
39	(Latvia)	Ralfs Bergmanis	Senior	D	5' 10" (1.78 m)	175 lb (79 kg)	2002-03-13	Liepāja, Latvia	Vermont (HEA)	—
44	(United States)	Reid Morich	Freshman	F	6' 2" (1.88 m)	214 lb (97 kg)	2005-04-11	Scottsdale, Arizona	Waterloo Black Hawks (USHL)	—

== Standings ==
2025–26 Central Collegiate Hockey Association standings
	Conference record										Overall record					
	GP	W	L	T	OTW	OTL	SW	PTS	GF	GA	GP	W	L	T	GF	GA
#14 Minnesota State †*	26	14	7	5	1	2	3	51	71	53	40	22	11	7	111	81
#18 St. Thomas	26	15	7	4	2	1	2	50	89	67	38	21	12	5	131	109
#17 Augustana	26	14	8	4	1	2	3	50	72	49	37	22	11	4	109	74
Michigan Tech	26	16	7	3	3	1	0	49	84	59	39	23	13	3	126	106
Bowling Green	26	15	7	4	3	2	1	49	80	59	36	18	11	7	107	88
Bemidji State	26	11	11	4	5	1	3	36	69	68	36	13	19	4	98	103
Lake Superior State	26	8	16	2	1	4	2	31	57	83	36	11	22	3	92	121
Ferris State	26	6	18	2	1	2	1	22	70	100	37	8	27	2	91	138
Northern Michigan	26	3	21	2	0	2	0	13	44	98	34	3	29	2	56	132
Championship: March 20, 2026 † indicates conference regular-season champion (MacNaughton Cup) * indicates conference tournament champion (Mason Cup); Rankings: USCHO.com Top 20 Poll; updated March 22, 2026; Source: CCHA

== Schedule and results ==
Date	Time	Opponent^{#}	Rank^{#}	Site	TV	Decision	Result	Attendance	Record
Regular Season
October 10	7:07 pm	at Omaha*	#20	Baxter Arena • Omaha, Nebraska		Tracy	L 2–6	6,385	0–1–0
October 11	6:07 pm	at Omaha*	#20	Baxter Arena • Omaha, Nebraska		Tracy	W 4–1	5,921	1–1–0
October 16	7:00 pm	at #17 Wisconsin*	#20	Kohl Center • Madison, Wisconsin	B1G+	Tracy	T 1–1 ^{OT}	6,555	1–1–1
October 17	7:00 pm	at #17 Wisconsin*	#20	Kohl Center • Madison, Wisconsin	B1G+	Tracy	T 2–2 ^{OT}	8,478	1–1–2
October 24	7:07 pm	Rensselaer*	#20	Mayo Clinic Health System Event Center • Mankato, Minnesota	Midco Sports+	Tracy	W 4–2	3,968	2–1–2
October 25	6:07 pm	Rensselaer*	#20	Mayo Clinic Health System Event Center • Mankato, Minnesota	Midco Sports+	Tracy	W 2–1	3,897	3–1–2
October 31	7:07 pm	at St. Thomas	#18	Lee & Penny Anderson Arena • Saint Paul, Minnesota	Midco Sports+	Tracy	W 3–1	2,544	4–1–2 (1–0–0)
November 1	6:07 pm	St. Thomas	#18	Mayo Clinic Health System Event Center • Mankato, Minnesota	Midco Sports+	Tracy	L 3–4 ^{OT}	4,184	4–2–2 (1–1–0)
November 7	7:07 pm	Bowling Green	#16	Mayo Clinic Health System Event Center • Mankato, Minnesota	Midco Sports+	Tracy	T 4–4 ^{SOW}	3,745	4–2–3 (1–1–1)
November 8	6:07 pm	Bowling Green	#16	Mayo Clinic Health System Event Center • Mankato, Minnesota	Midco Sports+	Tracy	T 1–1 ^{SOL}	4,119	4–2–4 (1–1–2)
November 14	6:07 pm	at Lake Superior State	#16	Taffy Abel Arena • Sault Ste. Marie, Michigan	Midco Sports+	Tracy	W 2–1 ^{OT}	—	5–2–4 (2–1–2)
November 15	5:07 pm	at Lake Superior State	#16	Taffy Abel Arena • Sault Ste. Marie, Michigan	Midco Sports+	Tracy	W 4–2	—	6–2–4 (3–1–2)
November 21	7:07 pm	Michigan Tech	#14	Mayo Clinic Health System Event Center • Mankato, Minnesota	Midco Sports+	Tracy	W 3–0	4,222	7–2–4 (4–1–2)
November 22	6:07 pm	Michigan Tech	#14	Mayo Clinic Health System Event Center • Mankato, Minnesota	Midco Sports+	Tracy	W 3–2	4,054	8–2–4 (5–1–2)
November 28	6:07 pm	at Northern Michigan	#14	Berry Events Center • Marquette, Michigan	Midco Sports+	Tracy	W 4–0	1,670	9–2–4 (6–1–2)
November 29	5:07 pm	at Northern Michigan	#14	Berry Events Center • Marquette, Michigan	Midco Sports+	Tracy	W 3–2	1,645	10–2–4 (7–1–2)
December 5	7:07 pm	Ferris State	#13	Mayo Clinic Health System Event Center • Mankato, Minnesota	Midco Sports+	Tracy	W 5–1	3,888	10–3–4 (7–2–2)
December 6	6:07 pm	Ferris State	#13	Mayo Clinic Health System Event Center • Mankato, Minnesota	Midco Sports+	Tracy	L 1–4	3,971	11–3–4 (8–2–2)
December 12	7:07 pm	at Augustana	#14	Midco Arena • Sioux Falls, South Dakota	Midco Sports+	Tracy	L 1–3	2,742	11–4–4 (8–3–2)
December 13	6:07 pm	at Augustana	#14	Midco Arena • Sioux Falls, South Dakota	Midco Sports+	Tracy	T 4–4 ^{SOL}	2,898	11–4–5 (8–3–3)
Coachella Valley Cactus Cup
January 2	5:30 pm	vs. Massachusetts Lowell*	#14	Acrisure Arena • Thousand Palms, California (Cactus Cup Semifinal)		Tracy	L 1–3	—	11–5–5
January 3	5:30 pm	vs. Yale*	#14	Acrisure Arena • Thousand Palms, California (Cactus Cup Consolation Game)		Beckford	W 4–3	—	12–5–5
January 10	6:07 pm	St. Thomas	#15	Mayo Clinic Health System Event Center • Mankato, Minnesota	Midco Sports+	Tracy	L 2–4	4,765	12–6–5 (8–4–3)
January 16	6:07 pm	at Michigan Tech	#17	MacInnes Student Ice Arena • Houghton, Michigan	Midco Sports+	Tracy	L 1–3	3,375	12–7–5 (8–5–3)
January 17	5:07 pm	at Michigan Tech	#17	MacInnes Student Ice Arena • Houghton, Michigan	Midco Sports+	Tracy	L 1–4	3,400	12–8–5 (8–6–3)
January 24	6:07 pm	#14 Augustana	#20	Mayo Clinic Health System Event Center • Mankato, Minnesota	Midco Sports+	Tracy	W 4–1	4,808	13–8–5 (9–6–3)
January 30	6:07 pm	at Ferris State	#18	Ewigleben Arena • Big Rapids, Michigan	Midco Sports+	Tracy	W 6–1	1,823	14–8–5 (10–6–3)
January 31	5:07 pm	at Ferris State	#18	Ewigleben Arena • Big Rapids, Michigan	Midco Sports+	Tracy	W 4–3	2,016	15–8–5 (11–6–3)
February 13	7:07 pm	Bemidji State	#16	Mayo Clinic Health System Event Center • Mankato, Minnesota	Midco Sports+	Tracy	W 1–0	4,101	16–8–5 (12–6–3)
February 14	6:07 pm	Bemidji State	#16	Mayo Clinic Health System Event Center • Mankato, Minnesota	Midco Sports+	Tracy	L 0–1 ^{OT}	4,415	16–9–5 (12–7–3)
February 20	7:07 pm	at Bowling Green	#17	Slater Family Ice Arena • Bowling Green, Ohio	Midco Sports+	Tracy	W 5–4	3,262	17–9–5 (13–7–3)
February 21	6:07 pm	at Bowling Green	#17	Slater Family Ice Arena • Bowling Green, Ohio	Midco Sports+	Tracy	T 1–1 ^{SOW}	4,317	17–9–6 (13–7–4)
February 27	7:07 pm	Northern Michigan	#18	Mayo Clinic Health System Event Center • Mankato, Minnesota	Midco Sports+	Tracy	T 2–2 ^{SOW}	4,196	17–9–7 (13–7–5)
February 28	6:07 pm	Northern Michigan	#18	Mayo Clinic Health System Event Center • Mankato, Minnesota	Midco Sports+	Tracy	W 3–0	4,892	18–9–7 (14–7–5)
CCHA Tournament
March 6	7:07 pm	Ferris State*	#16	Mayo Clinic Health System Event Center • Mankato, Minnesota (CCHA Quarterfinal Game 1)	Midco Sports+	Tracy	W 5–1	3,068	19–9–7
March 7	6:07 pm	Ferris State*	#16	Mayo Clinic Health System Event Center • Mankato, Minnesota (CCHA Quarterfinal Game 2)	Midco Sports+	Tracy	L 1–2 ^{OT}	2,866	19–10–7
March 8	5:07 pm	Ferris State*	#16	Mayo Clinic Health System Event Center • Mankato, Minnesota (CCHA Quarterfinal Game 3)	Midco Sports+	Tracy	W 2–0	2,065	20–10–7
March 14	8:07 pm	#19 Michigan Tech*	#16	Mayo Clinic Health System Event Center • Mankato, Minnesota (CCHA Semifinal)	Midco Sports+	Tracy	W 7–2	3,520	21–10–7
March 20	7:07 pm	#15 St. Thomas*	#16	Mayo Clinic Health System Event Center • Mankato, Minnesota (CCHA Championship)	Midco Sports+	Tracy	W 4–1	4,892	22–10–7
NCAA Tournament
March 27	1:30 pm	vs. #5 Western Michigan*	#14	Blue Arena • Loveland, Colorado (Regional Semifinal)	ESPNU	Tracy	L 1–3		22–11–7
*Non-conference game. ^{#}Rankings from USCHO.com Poll. All times are in Central Time. Source:

== Rankings ==
Poll	Week																											
Poll	Pre	1	2	3	4	5	6	7	8	9	10	11	12	13	14	15	16	17	18	19	20	21	22	23	24	25	26	27 (Final)
USCHO.com	18	20	20	20	18	16	16	14	14	13	14	15	–	14	15	17	20	18	17	16	17	18	16	16	16	14		
USA Hockey	18	20	19	20	19	18	18	14	14	13	14	14	–	14	15т	17	20	18	17	16	17	18	16	18	16	14		

Note: USCHO did not release a poll in week 12.
Note: USA Hockey did not release a poll in week 12.
