= 2026 CCHA tournament =

2026 CCHA men's ice hockey tournament
- Dates: March 6–20, 2026
- Teams: 8
- Finals site: Mayo Clinic Health System Event Center; Mankato, Minnesota
- Champions: Minnesota State (4th title)
- Winning coach: Luke Strand (2nd title)
- MVP: Alex Tracy (Minnesota State)
- CCHA men's Ice Hockey Tournaments

The 2026 CCHA Tournament was the 47th tournament in the history of the Central Collegiate Hockey Association. It began on March 6 and ended on March 20, 2026. All games were played at home campus sites. By winning the tournament, Minnesota State received the CCHA's automatic bid for the 2026 NCAA Division I men's ice hockey tournament.

== Format ==
The first round of the postseason tournament features a best-of-three games format, while the semifinals and final are single games held at the campus sites of the highest remaining seeds. The top eight conference teams in the standings participated in the tournament. Teams are seeded No. 1 through No. 8 according to their final conference standings, with a tiebreaker system used to seed teams with an identical number of points accumulated. The higher-seeded teams each earned home ice and hosted one of the lower-seeded teams. The teams that advance out of the quarterfinals are reseeded according to the regular season standings. The semifinals and final are single-elimination games. The winners of the semifinals play one another to determine the conference tournament champion.

== Conference standings ==
2025–26 Central Collegiate Hockey Association standings
	Conference record										Overall record					
	GP	W	L	T	OTW	OTL	SW	PTS	GF	GA	GP	W	L	T	GF	GA
#14 Minnesota State †*	26	14	7	5	1	2	3	51	71	53	40	22	11	7	111	81
#18 St. Thomas	26	15	7	4	2	1	2	50	89	67	38	21	12	5	131	109
#17 Augustana	26	14	8	4	1	2	3	50	72	49	37	22	11	4	109	74
Michigan Tech	26	16	7	3	3	1	0	49	84	59	39	23	13	3	126	106
Bowling Green	26	15	7	4	3	2	1	49	80	59	36	18	11	7	107	88
Bemidji State	26	11	11	4	5	1	3	36	69	68	36	13	19	4	98	103
Lake Superior State	26	8	16	2	1	4	2	31	57	83	36	11	22	3	92	121
Ferris State	26	6	18	2	1	2	1	22	70	100	37	8	27	2	91	138
Northern Michigan	26	3	21	2	0	2	0	13	44	98	34	3	29	2	56	132
Championship: March 20, 2026 † indicates conference regular-season champion (MacNaughton Cup) * indicates conference tournament champion (Mason Cup); Rankings: USCHO.com Top 20 Poll; updated March 22, 2026; Source: CCHA

== Bracket ==
Quarterfinals; March 6–8
1	Minnesota State	5	1	2
8	Ferris State	1	2*	0
2	St. Thomas	4*	5	—
7	Lake Superior State	3	2	—
(Teams are reseeded after the Quarterfinal round)
3	Augustana	5	2	—
6	Bemidji State	2	1	—
4	Michigan Tech	5	3	—
5	Bowling Green	3	2	—

Semifinals; March 14
1	Minnesota State	7
4	Michigan Tech	2
2	St. Thomas	2
3	Augustana	1

Championship; March 20
1	Minnesota State	4
2	St. Thomas	1

Note: * denotes overtime period(s)

== Results ==
Note: All game times are local.

=== Quarterfinals ===
==== (1) Minnesota State vs. (8) Ferris State ====
March 6, 2026; 7:07 pm	Minnesota State	5–1 (2–0, 1–1, 2–0)	Ferris State	Mayo Clinic Health System Event Center; Attendance: 3,068

Game reference

Alex Tracy
Goalies
Martin Lundberg
Referees:
Rick Nelson
Sterling Egan
Linesmen:
Nick Huff
Patrick Giles

(Zetterberg, Somoza) Jack Smith – 2:02	1–0
(Williams) Evan Murr – GW – 16:31	2–0
(Smith, Somoza) Alex Zetterberg– 29:10	3–0
	3–1	30:41 – Xavier Jean-Louis (Silich)
(LeBel) Campbell Cichosz – 46:35	4–1
Luigi Benincasa – EN, UA – 58:53	5–1

8 min
Penalties
4 min
35
Shots
13

March 7, 2026; 6:07 pm	Minnesota State	1–2 (OT) (0–0, 1-1, 0–0, 0–1)	Ferris State	Mayo Clinic Health System Event Center; Attendance: 2,866

Game reference

Alex Tracy
Goalies
Martin Lundberg
Referees:
Rick Nelson
Sterling Egan
Linesmen:
Nick Huff
Patrick Giles

(Watkins) Luigi Benincasa – 36:42	1–0
	1–1	38:47 – John Lundy (McGrath, Doell)
	1–2	61:45 – GW – Caden Brown (Best, Mesic)

4 min
Penalties
8 min
29
Shots
13

March 8, 2026; 5:07 pm	Minnesota State	2–0 (0–0, 2–0, 0–0)	Ferris State	Mayo Clinic Health System Event Center; Attendance: 2,065

Game reference
Alex Tracy	Goalies	Martin Lundberg	Referees: Rick Nelson; Sterling Egan; Linesmen: Nick Huff; Patrick Giles
Luigi Benincasa – GW – 21:32 / 1–0; (Cichosz, Somoza) Mason Wheeler – 35:57 / 2–0			Referees: Rick Nelson; Sterling Egan; Linesmen: Nick Huff; Patrick Giles
6 min	Penalties	6 min	Referees: Rick Nelson; Sterling Egan; Linesmen: Nick Huff; Patrick Giles
46	Shots	17	Referees: Rick Nelson; Sterling Egan; Linesmen: Nick Huff; Patrick Giles

Minnesota State wins series 2–1

==== (2) St. Thomas vs. (7) Lake Superior State ====
March 6, 2026; 7:07 pm	St. Thomas	4–3 (OT) (2–0, 0–3, 1–0, 1–0)	Lake Superior State	Lee & Penny Anderson Arena; Attendance: 1,217

Game reference

Carsen Musser
Goalies
Rorke Applebee
Referees:
Michael Forys
Bobby Lukkason
Linesmen:
Andrew Dokken
Nathan Voll

(Braccini, Miller) Caige Sterzer – 1:12	1–0
(Gaffney) Ryan O'Neill – 11:51	2–0
	2–1	26:04 – PP – Carter Batchelder (Druskinis, Milburn)
	2–2	34:04 – Connor Milburn (Ramos, Teleguine)
	2–3	38:01 – John Herrington (Sobush, Batchelder)
(Gaffney) Ryan O'Neill – 51:50	3–3
(Godbout) Chase Cheslock – GW – 67:51	4–3

2 min
Penalties
17 min
40
Shots
25

March 7, 2026; 7:07 pm	St. Thomas	5–2 (1–1, 1–0, 3–1)	Lake Superior State	Lee & Penny Anderson Arena; Attendance: 1,286

Game reference

Carsen Musser
Goalies
Rorke Applebee
Referees:
Michael Forys
Bobby Lukkason
Linesmen:
Andrew Dokken
Nathan Voll

(Godbout, Sterzer) Colton Jamieson – 2:02	1–0
	1–1	6:01 – Ryan Beck (Teleguine, Milburn)
(O'Neill) Lucas Wahlin – 30:41	2–1
	2–2	55:48 – Evan Bushy (Piku, Batchelder)
(Schoen, Berry) Lucas Van Vliet – GW – 57:23	3–2
Lucas Wahlin – EN – 58:08	4–2
(Wahlin) Lucas Van Vliet – EN – 59:15	5–2

6 min
Penalties
10 min
43
Shots
29

St. Thomas wins series 2–0

==== (3) Augustana vs. (6) Bemidji State ====
March 6, 2026; 7:07 pm	Augustana	5–2 (1–0, 2–0, 1–2)	Bemidji State	Midco Arena; Attendance: 3,082

Game reference

Josh Kotai
Goalies
Max Hildebrand
Referees:
Colin Hronforst
Nicholas Bradshaw
Linesmen:
Kyle Domin
Gabe Halonen

(Hennen, Meerman) Landon Fandel – 17:46	1–0
(Friesen) Easton Young – 26:53	2–0
(Meritähti, Chakrabarti) Joey DelGreco – GW – 30:26	3–0
(Bohn, Friesen) Nace Langus – 54:09	4–0
	4–1	40:13 – Connor McClennon (Magnussen, Peer)
	4–2	41:18 – PP – Oliver Peer (McClennon, Magnussen)
(Langus, DelGreco) Colton Friesen – EN – 59:21	5–2

4 min
Penalties
2 min
27
Shots
33

March 7, 2026; 6:07 pm	Augustana	2–1 (0–1, 0–1, 2–1)	Bemidji State	Midco Arena; Attendance: 3,082

Game reference

Josh Kotai
Goalies
Max Hildebrand
Referees:
Colin Hronforst
Nicholas Bradshaw
Linesmen:
Kyle Domin
Gabe Halonen

(Langus, Bohn) Colton Friesen – 57:03	1–0
(Kotai) Joey DelGreco – EN, GW – 58:32	2–0
	2–1	19:19 – Reilly Funk (Peer, Magnussen)

6 min
Penalties
4 min
19
Shots
43

Augustana wins series 2–0

==== (4) Michigan Tech vs. (5) Bowling Green ====
March 6, 2026; 7:07 pm	Michigan Tech	5–3 (2–1, 1–1, 2–1)	Bowling Green	MacInnes Student Ice Arena; Attendance: 2,836

Game reference

Owen Bartoszkiewicz
Goalies
Tyler Palmer
Referees:
Stephen McInchak
Bruce Vida Jr
Linesmen:
Eric Froberg
Jamie Grace

(Van Blaricom, Miller) Carson Birnie – 3:42	1–0
	1–1	11:14 – Maxwell Martin (Crampton, Doran)
(Miller, Trembecky) Isaac Gordon – 14:17	2–1
	2–2	28:22 – Gustav Stjernberg (Niedermayer, Waters)
(Leppa, Koskipirtti) Noah Reinhart – PP – 37:53	3–2
(Prouty, Bartoszkiewicz) Teydon Trembecky – GW – 53:10	4–2
	4–3	56:22 – PP, EA – Jérémie Minville (Emerson, Rymon)
(Prouty) Isaac Gordon – EN – 59:36	5–3

6 min
Penalties
2 min
18
Shots
39

March 7, 2026; 6:07 pm	Michigan Tech	3–2 (1–0, 1–0, 1–2)	Bowling Green	MacInnes Student Ice Arena; Attendance: 3,160

Game reference

Owen Bartoszkiewicz
Goalies
Cole Moore
Referees:
Steve McInchak
Bruce Vida Jr.
Linesmen:
Eric Froberg
Jamie Grace

(Cicek, Baker) Stiven Sardarian – 8:22	1–0
(Parker, Cicek) Lauri Raiman – 31:37	2–0
	2–1	55:16 – Jackson Niedermayer (Emerson, Higgins)
(Sardarian, Baker) Luca Fasciano – EN, GW – 59:00	3–1
	3–2	59:33 – Dominik Rymon (Higgins, Doran)

6 min
Penalties
2 min
26
Shots
42

Michigan Tech wins series 2–0

=== Semifinals ===
==== (1) Minnesota State vs. (4) Michigan Tech ====
March 14, 2026; 7:07 pm	Minnesota State	7–2 (3–0, 4–1, 0–1)	Michigan Tech	Mayo Clinic Health System Event Center; Attendance: 3,520

Game reference

Alex Tracy
Goalies
Owen Bartoszkiewicz
Ryan Manzella
Bryant Lee
Referees:
Colin Kronforst
Bobby Lukkason
Linesmen:
Nathan Voll
Andrew Dokken

(Zetterberg) Ean Somoza – 8:15	1–0
(Watkins, Murr) Tristan Lemyre – 11:53	2–0
(Wheeler, Lemyre) Luigi Benincasa – GW – 13:48	3–0
(Watkins, Benincasa) Tristan Lemyre – 24:22	4–0
	4–1	25:30 – Tom Leppa (Parker, Van Blaricom)
(Scholl, Murr) Reid Morich – 32:24	5–1
(Cichosz, LeBel) Fin Williams – 33:30	6–1
Reid Morich – 34:32	7–1
	7–2	50:50 – Isaac Gordon (Fasciano)

4 min
Penalties
0 min
21
Shots
25

==== (2) St. Thomas vs. (3) Augustana ====
March 14, 2025; 4:07 pm	St. Thomas	2–1 (0–0, 0–0, 2–1)	Augustana	St. Thomas Ice Arena; Attendance: 2,338

Game reference

Carsen Musser
Goalies
Josh Kotai
Referees:
Steve McInchak
Bruce Vida Jr.
Linesmen:
Eric Froberg
Jamie Grace

(Williams) Lucas Van Vliet – 45:23	1–0
	1–1	46:20 – Owen Baumgartner (Bohn, Langus)
(Wahlin) Alex Gaffney – GW – 50:53	2–1

2 min
Penalties
2 min
28
Shots
24

=== Championship ===
==== (1) Minnesota State vs. (2) St. Thomas ====
March 20, 2026; 7:07 pm	Minnesota State	4–1 (1–1, 1–0, 2–0)	St. Thomas	Mayo Clinic Health System Event Center; Attendance: 4,892

Game reference

Alex Tracy
Goalies
Carsen Musser
Referees:
Rick Nelson
Sterling Egan
Linesmen:
Nick Huff
Patrick Giles

(Murr, Watkins) Tristan Lemyre – 6:24	1–0
	1–1	16:44 – Dylan Godbout (Berry, Lippai)
(Bergmanis, Ronn) Evan Murr – GW – 35:07	2–1
(Lemyre) Luigi Benincasa – 53:41	3–1
(Murr, Lemyre) Jack Smith – PP – 55:49	4–1

8 min
Penalties
8 min
39
Shots
30

== Tournament awards ==
=== Three Stars ===
- 1st Alex Tracy* (Minnesota State)
- 2nd Evan Murr (Minnesota State)
- 3rd Dylan Godbout (St. Thomas)

* Most Valuable Player(s)
