= 2025–26 Augustana (South Dakota) Vikings men's ice hockey season =

2025–26 Augustana Vikings men's ice hockey season
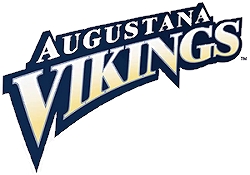
- Conference: CCHA
- Home ice: Midco Arena

Rankings
- USCHO: #18
- USA Hockey: #18

Record
- Overall: 22–11–4
- Conference: 14–8–4
- Home: 16–2–3
- Road: 6–9–1

Coaches and captains
- Head coach: Garrett Raboin
- Assistant coaches: Taylor Nelson; Blake Hietala; Brady Ferner
- Captain: Hunter Bischoff
- Alternate captain(s): Hayden Hennen; Will Svenddal

The 2025–26 Augustana (South Dakota) Vikings men's ice hockey season was third season of play for the program and 3rd in the CCHA. The Vikings represented Augustana University in the 2025–26 NCAA Division I men's ice hockey season, played their home games at Midco Arena and were coached by Garrett Raboin in his third season.

== Departures ==
Player	Position	Nationality	Cause
Simon Falk	Forward	Sweden	Graduation (signed with Lillehammer IK)
Kayden Hargraves	Goaltender	United States	Left program
Payton Matsui	Forward	United States	Graduation (retired)
Evan McIntyre	Defenseman	Canada	Graduation (retired)
Luke Mobley	Forward	United States	Graduation (signed with Iowa Heartlanders)
Uula Ruikka	Defenseman	Finland	Graduation (signed with Jokerit)
Brady Ziemer	Defenseman	United States	Graduation (retired)

== Recruiting ==
Player	Position	Nationality	Age	Notes
Leo Bulgakov	Forward	Belarus	20	Minsk, BLR
Cole Burtch	Forward	Canada	24	Markham, ON; transfer from Ferris State
Max Chakrabarti	Defenseman	Canada	20	Surrey, BC
Landon Fandel	Defenseman	United States	20	Sioux Falls, SD
Kolby Hay	Goaltender	Canada	21	Kamloops, BC
Jacob Jastrzebski	Forward	United States	20	Chicago, IL
Samo Meritähti	Defenseman	Finland	22	Seinäjoki, FIN; transfer from Providence

== Roster ==
As of August 29, 2025.

No.	Nat.	Player	Class	Pos	Height	Weight	DoB	Hometown	Previous team	NHL rights
1	(United States)	Christian Manz	Sophomore	G	6' 0" (1.83 m)	181 lb (82 kg)	2004-01-13	Blaine, Minnesota	Sioux Falls Stampede (USHL)	—
2	(United States)	Landon Fandel	Freshman	D	5' 10" (1.78 m)	185 lb (84 kg)	2005-05-24	Sioux Falls, South Dakota	Tri-City Storm (USHL)	—
4	(Canada)	Max Chakrabarti	Freshman	D	6' 3" (1.91 m)	181 lb (82 kg)	2005-06-21	Surrey, British Columbia	Weyburn Red Wings (SJHL)	—
5	(United States)	Easton Young	Sophomore	D	5' 11" (1.8 m)	185 lb (84 kg)	2003-07-25	Grand Rapids, Michigan	Johnstown Tomahawks (NAHL)	—
6	(Finland)	Samo Meritähti	Sophomore (RS)	D	6' 3" (1.91 m)	192 lb (87 kg)	2003-03-06	Seinäjoki, Finland	Providence (HEA)	—
8	(United States)	Ben Troumbly	Senior	F	5' 7" (1.7 m)	160 lb (73 kg)	2001-11-21	Bovey, Minnesota	Bismarck Bobcats (NAHL)	—
9	(United States)	Hayden Hennen	Junior	D	6' 4" (1.93 m)	175 lb (79 kg)	2002-08-13	Hallock, Minnesota	Anchorage Wolverines (NAHL)	—
10	(United States)	Joey DelGreco	Sophomore	F	6' 2" (1.88 m)	210 lb (95 kg)	2003-11-25	Plymouth, Minnesota	Chicago Steel (USHL)	—
11	(United States)	Tyler Hennen (A)	Sophomore	F	5' 11" (1.8 m)	150 lb (68 kg)	2004-08-31	Hallock, Minnesota	Anchorage Wolverines (NAHL)	—
12	(United States)	Hunter Bischoff (C)	Junior	F	6' 1" (1.85 m)	182 lb (83 kg)	2003-03-24	Cohasset, Minnesota	Youngstown Phantoms (USHL)	—
13	(United States)	Will Howard	Junior	F	6' 2" (1.88 m)	195 lb (88 kg)	2002-07-30	Grand Forks, North Dakota	New Mexico Ice Wolves (NAHL)	—
19	(United States)	Will Svenddal (A)	Junior	D	6' 1" (1.85 m)	195 lb (88 kg)	2001-10-12	Minneapolis, Minnesota	Minnesota Magicians (NAHL)	—
20	(Finland)	Jacob Jastrzebski	Freshman	F	6' 0" (1.83 m)	192 lb (87 kg)	2005-07-27	Chicago, Illinois	Des Moines Buccaneers (USHL)	—
21	(United States)	Quinn Rudrud	Senior	F	6' 3" (1.91 m)	185 lb (84 kg)	2001-08-18	Farmington, Minnesota	Alaska (NCAA)	—
23	(United States)	Carter Theissen	Sophomore	D	5' 11" (1.8 m)	181 lb (82 kg)	2003-07-10	Plymouth, Minnesota	Wisconsin Windigo (NAHL)	—
24	(Canada)	Colton Friesen	Senior	F	5' 10" (1.78 m)	170 lb (77 kg)	2001-12-09	Winnipeg, Manitoba	Wisconsin–Superior (WIAC)	—
26	(Canada)	Callum Gau	Junior	F	6' 2" (1.88 m)	180 lb (82 kg)	2002-06-19	Camrose, Alberta	Camrose Kodiaks (AJHL)	—
27	(United States)	Garett Drotts	Sophomore	F	6' 0" (1.83 m)	174 lb (79 kg)	2003-11-21	Grand Rapids, Michigan	Des Moines Buccaneers (USHL)	—
30	(Canada)	Kolby Hay	Freshman	G	6' 5" (1.96 m)	185 lb (84 kg)	2004-05-14	Kamloops, British Columbia	Greenville Swamp Rabbits (ECHL)	—
32	(Canada)	Josh Kotai	Junior	G	6' 2" (1.88 m)	175 lb (79 kg)	2003-03-13	Abbotsford, British Columbia	Battlefords North Stars (SJHL)	—
72	(Canada)	Brett Meerman	Junior	F	5' 9" (1.75 m)	177 lb (80 kg)	2002-02-04	Blackfalds, Alberta	Blackfalds Bulldogs (AJHL)	—
81	(United States)	Owen Bohn	Junior	F	5' 11" (1.8 m)	165 lb (75 kg)	2002-02-12	Morgan Hill, California	Victoria Grizzlies (BCHL)	—
84	(United States)	Jeff Hutchinson	Junior	D	6' 2" (1.88 m)	200 lb (91 kg)	2002-05-02	St. Louis, Missouri	New Mexico Ice Wolves (NAHL)	—
86	(Slovenia)	Nace Langus	Sophomore	F	6' 1" (1.85 m)	190 lb (86 kg)	2004-12-05	Jesenice, Slovenia	IK Oskarshamn J20 (J20 Nationell)	—
92	(Belarus)	Leo Bulgakov	Freshman	F	5' 9" (1.75 m)	165 lb (75 kg)	2004-11-12	Minsk, Belarus	Aberdeen Wings (NAHL)	—
93	(Canada)	Cole Burtch	Junior (RS)	F	5' 10" (1.78 m)	168 lb (76 kg)	2001-01-11	Markham, Ontario	Ferris State (CCHA)	—
96	(United States)	Owen Baumgartner	Junior	D	5' 10" (1.78 m)	185 lb (84 kg)	2002-07-01	Owatonna, Minnesota	Air Force (AHA)	—

== Standings ==
2025–26 Central Collegiate Hockey Association standings
	Conference record										Overall record					
	GP	W	L	T	OTW	OTL	SW	PTS	GF	GA	GP	W	L	T	GF	GA
#14 Minnesota State †*	26	14	7	5	1	2	3	51	71	53	39	22	10	7	110	78
#17 St. Thomas	26	15	7	4	2	1	2	50	89	67	38	21	12	5	131	109
#18 Augustana	26	14	8	4	1	2	3	50	72	49	37	22	11	4	109	74
Michigan Tech	26	16	7	3	3	1	0	49	84	59	39	23	13	3	126	106
Bowling Green	26	15	7	4	3	2	1	49	80	59	36	18	11	7	107	88
Bemidji State	26	11	11	4	5	1	3	36	69	68	36	13	19	4	98	103
Lake Superior State	26	8	16	2	1	4	2	31	57	83	36	11	22	3	92	121
Ferris State	26	6	18	2	1	2	1	22	70	100	37	8	27	2	91	138
Northern Michigan	26	3	21	2	0	2	0	13	44	98	34	3	29	2	56	132
Championship: March 20, 2026 † indicates conference regular-season champion (MacNaughton Cup) * indicates conference tournament champion (Mason Cup); Rankings: USCHO.com Top 20 Poll; updated March 22, 2026; Source: CCHA

== Schedule and results ==
Date	Time	Opponent^{#}	Rank^{#}	Site	TV	Decision	Result	Attendance	Record
Exhibition
October 3	6:00 pm	at St. Cloud State*		Herb Brooks National Hockey Center • St. Cloud, Minnesota (Exhibition)	The CW	Hay	T 2–2		
Regular Season
October 10	7:07 pm	at Minnesota Duluth*		AMSOIL Arena • Duluth, Minnesota	My9	Kotai	L 1–4	5,541	0–1–0
October 11	6:07 pm	at Minnesota Duluth*		AMSOIL Arena • Duluth, Minnesota	My9	Kotai	W 4–0	5,658	1–1–0
October 17	7:07 pm	#15 Arizona State*		Midco Arena • Sioux Falls, South Dakota	Midco Sports+	Kotai	W 4–2	2,710	2–1–0
October 18	6:07 pm	#15 Arizona State*		Midco Arena • Sioux Falls, South Dakota	Midco Sports+	Kotai	W 5–2	2,913	3–1–0
October 24	7:07 pm	at Bemidji State		Sanford Center • Bemidji, Minnesota	Midco Sports+	Kotai	L 0–1 ^{OT}	2,818	3–2–0 (0–1–0)
October 25	6:07 pm	at Bemidji State		Sanford Center • Bemidji, Minnesota	Midco Sports+	Kotai	L 2–3	2,613	3–3–0 (0–2–0)
October 31	7:07 pm	Northern Michigan		Midco Arena • Sioux Falls, South Dakota	Midco Sports+	Kotai	W 2–1	2,171	4–3–0 (1–2–0)
November 1	6:07 pm	Northern Michigan		Midco Arena • Sioux Falls, South Dakota	Midco Sports+	Kotai	W 3–1	2,579	5–3–0 (2–2–0)
November 7	6:07 pm	at Ferris State		Ewigleben Arena • Big Rapids, Michigan	Midco Sports+	Kotai	W 4–2	1,592	6–3–0 (3–2–0)
November 8	5:07 pm	at Ferris State		Ewigleben Arena • Big Rapids, Michigan	Midco Sports+	Kotai	L 0–2	1,619	6–4–0 (3–3–0)
November 15	6:07 pm	St. Thomas		Midco Arena • Sioux Falls, South Dakota	Midco Sports+	Kotai	T 4–4 ^{SOW}	3,048	6–4–1 (3–3–1)
November 28	6:07 pm	at Lake Superior State		Taffy Abel Arena • Sault Ste. Marie, Michigan	Midco Sports+	Kotai	L 1–2	—	6–5–1 (3–4–1)
November 29	7:07 pm	at Lake Superior State		Taffy Abel Arena • Sault Ste. Marie, Michigan	Midco Sports+	Kotai	W 2–1	—	7–5–1 (4–4–1)
December 5	7:07 pm	Bemidji State		Midco Arena • Sioux Falls, South Dakota	Midco Sports+	Kotai	W 3–1	2,540	8–5–1 (5–4–1)
December 7	7:07 pm	Bemidji State		Midco Arena • Sioux Falls, South Dakota	Midco Sports+	Kotai	T 4–4 ^{SOL}	2,290	8–5–2 (5–4–2)
December 12	7:07 pm	#14 Minnesota State		Midco Arena • Sioux Falls, South Dakota	Midco Sports+	Kotai	W 3–1	2,742	9–5–2 (6–4–2)
December 13	6:07 pm	#14 Minnesota State		Midco Arena • Sioux Falls, South Dakota	Midco Sports+	Kotai	T 4–4 ^{SOW}	2,898	9–5–3 (6–4–3)
December 19	7:07 pm	Omaha*		Midco Arena • Sioux Falls, South Dakota	Midco Sports+	Kotai	W 7–4	2,542	10–5–3
December 20	6:07 pm	Omaha*		Midco Arena • Sioux Falls, South Dakota	Midco Sports+	Kotai	L 1–4	2,925	10–6–3
January 2	7:07 pm	Colorado College*		Midco Arena • Sioux Falls, South Dakota	Midco Sports+	Manz	W 3–2	2,665	11–6–3
January 3	6:07 pm	Colorado College*		Midco Arena • Sioux Falls, South Dakota	Midco Sports+	Manz	W 4–2	2,665	12–6–3
January 9	6:07 pm	at Northern Michigan	#17	Berry Events Center • Marquette, Michigan	Midco Sports+	Kotai	W 3–0	2,343	13–6–3 (7–4–3)
January 10	5:07 pm	at Northern Michigan	#17	Berry Events Center • Marquette, Michigan	Midco Sports+	Kotai	W 2–0	—	14–6–3 (8–4–3)
January 16	7:07 pm	Ferris State	#15	Midco Arena • Sioux Falls, South Dakota	Midco Sports+	Kotai	W 4–0	2,597	15–6–3 (9–4–3)
January 17	6:07 pm	Ferris State	#15	Midco Arena • Sioux Falls, South Dakota	Midco Sports+	Kotai	W 4–3 ^{OT}	2,908	16–6–3 (10–4–3)
January 24	6:07 pm	at #20 Minnesota State	#14	Mayo Clinic Health System Event Center • Mankato, Minnesota	Midco Sports+	Kotai	L 1–4	4,808	16–7–3 (10–5–3)
January 30	7:07 pm	Lake Superior State	#16	Midco Arena • Sioux Falls, South Dakota	Midco Sports+	Kotai	W 6–1	2,970	17–7–3 (11–5–3)
January 31	6:07 pm	Lake Superior State	#16	Midco Arena • Sioux Falls, South Dakota	Midco Sports+	Kotai	W 4–1	2,880	18–7–3 (12–5–3)
February 6	6:07 pm	at #20 Michigan Tech	#16	MacInnes Student Ice Arena • Houghton, Michigan	Midco Sports+	Kotai	L 2–3 ^{OT}	3,835	18–8–3 (12–6–3)
February 7	4:07 pm	at #20 Michigan Tech	#16	MacInnes Student Ice Arena • Houghton, Michigan	Midco Sports+	Kotai	L 3–4	4,000	18–9–3 (12–7–3)
February 13	7:07 pm	Bowling Green	#18	Midco Arena • Sioux Falls, South Dakota	Midco Sports+	Kotai	L 0–1	2,801	18–10–3 (12–8–3)
February 14	6:07 pm	Bowling Green	#18	Midco Arena • Sioux Falls, South Dakota	Midco Sports+	Kotai	W 4–2	2,677	19–10–3 (13–8–3)
February 20	7:07 pm	at #15 St. Thomas	#18	Lee & Penny Anderson Arena • Saint Paul, Minnesota	Midco Sports+	Kotai	T 3–3 ^{SOW}	3,591	19–10–4 (13–8–4)
February 21	6:07 pm	at #15 St. Thomas	#18	Lee & Penny Anderson Arena • Saint Paul, Minnesota	Midco Sports+	Kotai	W 4–0	3,165	20–10–4 (14–8–4)
CCHA Tournament
March 6	7:07 pm	Bemidji State*	#15	Midco Arena • Sioux Falls, South Dakota (CCHA Quarterfinal Game 1)	Midco Sports+	Kotai	W 5–2	3,082	21–10–4
March 7	6:07 pm	Bemidji State*	#15	Midco Arena • Sioux Falls, South Dakota (CCHA Quarterfinal Game 2)	Midco Sports+	Kotai	W 2–1	3,082	22–10–4
March 14	4:07 pm	at #18 St. Thomas*	#13	Lee & Penny Anderson Arena • Saint Paul, Minnesota (CCHA Semifinal)	Midco Sports+	Kotai	L 1–2	2,338	22–11–4
*Non-conference game. ^{#}Rankings from USCHO.com Poll. All times are in Central Time. Source:

== Rankings ==
Poll	Week																											
Poll	Pre	1	2	3	4	5	6	7	8	9	10	11	12	13	14	15	16	17	18	19	20	21	22	23	24	25	26	27 (Final)
USCHO.com	RV	RV	RV	RV	NR	RV	NR	NR	NR	NR	RV	RV	–	RV	17	15	14	16	16	18	18	15	15	13	18	18		
USA Hockey	NR	NR	NR	RV	NR	NR	RV	NR	RV	RV	RV	20т	–	RV	18	15	14т	16	16	18	18	15	14	13	18	18		

Note: USCHO did not release a poll in week 12.
Note: USA Hockey did not release a poll in week 12.
