= 2025–26 St. Thomas (Minnesota) Tommies men's ice hockey season =

2025–26 St. Thomas Tommies men's ice hockey season
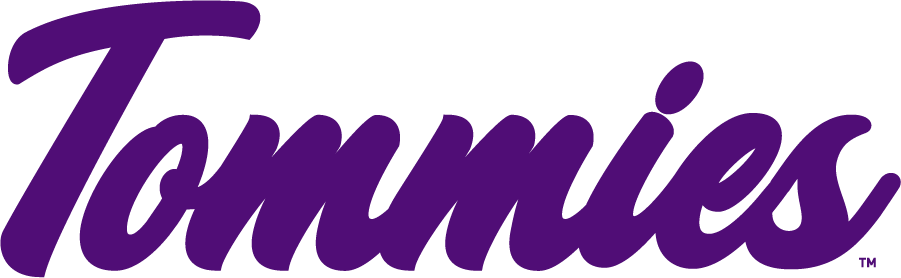
- Conference: CCHA
- Home ice: Lee & Penny Anderson Arena

Rankings
- USCHO: #17
- USA Hockey: #17

Record
- Overall: 21–12–5
- Conference: 16–7–4
- Home: 11–6–2
- Road: 10–5–3
- Neutral: 0–1–0

Coaches and captains
- Head coach: Enrico Blasi
- Assistant coaches: Leon Hayward; Cory Laylin; Karl Goehring
- Captain: Lucas Wahlin

The 2025–26 St. Thomas Tommies men's ice hockey season was the 102nd season of play for the program, the 5th at the Division I level and the 5th and final in the CCHA. The Tommies represented the University of St. Thomas (Minnesota), played their home games at the Lee & Penny Anderson Arena and were coached by Enrico Blasi in his 5th season.

== Departures ==
Player	Position	Nationality	Cause
Tobias Abrahamsson	Defenseman	Sweden	Signed professional contract (Kalmar HC)
Ray Christy	Forward	United States	Graduation (retired)
Grant Docter	Defenseman	United States	Graduation (signed with HC Falcons Brixen)
Ryder Donovan	Forward	United States	Graduation (retired)
Ethan Elias	Defenseman	United States	Transferred to Lindenwood
Chase Foley	Defenseman	United States	Graduation (retired)
Ethan Gauer	Defenseman	United States	Graduation (retired)
Cooper Gay	Forward	United States	Signed professional contract (Colorado Avalanche)
Matthew Gleason	Forward	United States	Graduation (signed with Coventry Blaze)
Liam Malmquist	Forward	United States	Graduation (signed with Manitoba Moose)
J. D. Metz	Forward/Defenseman	United States	Left program
Nick Mikan	Forward	United States	Transferred to Miami
Maximilian Prazma	Goaltender	Canada	Left program (retired)
Jake Ratzlaff	Defenseman	United States	Signed professional contract (Rapid City Rush)
Jake Sibell	Goaltender	United States	Graduation (signed with Greensboro Gargoyles)
Alexander Tell	Forward	Sweden	Signed professional contract (EC Bregenzerwald)

== Recruiting ==
Player	Position	Nationality	Age	Notes
Bauer Berry	Defenseman	United States	19	Grand Forks, ND; selected 218th overall in 2024
Alex Gaffney	Forward	United States	23	West Orange, NJ; graduate transfer from Harvard
Joshua Giuliani	Forward	United States	21	Plymouth, MN
Dylan Godbout	Forward	United States	21	Woodbury, MN; transfer from Ohio State
Hayes Hundley	Defenseman	United States	20	Upper Arlington, OH
Will Ingemann	Goaltender	United States	20	Plymouth, MN
Colton Jamieson	Defenseman	United States	20	Hudson, WI
Attila Lippai	Forward	United States	20	Saint Paul, MN
Carsen Musser	Goaltender	United States	20	Fairmont, MN; transfer from Colorado College; selected 166th overall in 2023
Nathan Pilling	Forward	Canada	21	Calgary, AB
Sam Ranallo	Forward	United States	20	Rogers, MN
Luke Schelter	Forward	United States	21	Centennial, CO
Charlie Schoen	Forward	United States	24	Andover, MN; transfer from Arizona State
Lucas Van Vliet	Forward	United States	19	Livonia, MI; selected 197th overall in 2024
Nick Williams	Defenseman	United States	22	Edina, MN; transfer from Michigan Tech

== Roster ==
As of September 11, 2025.

No.	Nat.	Player	Class	Pos	Height	Weight	DoB	Hometown	Previous team	NHL rights
1	(United States)	Will Ingemann	Freshman	G	5' 11" (1.8 m)	179 lb (81 kg)	2005-04-22	Plymouth, Minnesota	Penticton Vees (BCHL)	—
2	(United States)	Colton Jamieson	Freshman	D	6' 0" (1.83 m)	198 lb (90 kg)	2004-11-28	Hudson, Wisconsin	Madison Capitols (USHL)	—
3	(United States)	Lucas Wahlin (C)	Senior	F	6' 0" (1.83 m)	170 lb (77 kg)	2001-05-03	Woodbury, Minnesota	Lincoln Stars (USHL)	—
4	(United States)	Cole Miller	Junior	D	5' 11" (1.8 m)	185 lb (84 kg)	2002-08-27	Littleton, Colorado	Sioux Falls Stampede (USHL)	—
5	(United States)	Hayes Hundley	Freshman	D	6' 3" (1.91 m)	207 lb (94 kg)	2005-03-22	Upper Arlington, Ohio	Fargo Force (USHL)	—
7	(United States)	Sam Ranallo	Freshman	F	5' 10" (1.78 m)	168 lb (76 kg)	2004-11-17	Rogers, Minnesota	Cranbrook Bucks (BCHL)	—
8	(Canada)	Caige Sterzer	Senior	F	6' 5" (1.96 m)	225 lb (102 kg)	2000-08-20	Kimberley, British Columbia	Lindenwood (NCAA)	—
9	(United States)	Casy Laylin	Sophomore	F	5' 9" (1.75 m)	170 lb (77 kg)	2004-01-09	St. Michael, Minnesota	Salmon Arm Silverbacks (BCHL)	—
10	(United States)	Mason Poolman	Junior	D	6' 1" (1.85 m)	189 lb (86 kg)	2002-01-31	East Grand Forks, Minnesota	Penticton Vees (BCHL)	—
11	(United States)	Ryan O'Neill	Senior	F	5' 10" (1.78 m)	175 lb (79 kg)	2001-02-25	Roseville, Minnesota	St. Cloud Norsemen (NAHL)	—
12	(United States)	Alex Gaffney	Graduate	F	5' 9" (1.75 m)	177 lb (80 kg)	2002-06-25	West Orange, New Jersey	Harvard (ECAC)	—
13	(United States)	Lucas Van Vliet	Freshman	F	6' 2" (1.88 m)	181 lb (82 kg)	2006-01-25	Livonia, Michigan	Dubuque Fighting Saints (USHL)	VGK, 197th overall 2024
14	(United States)	Jase Sofo	Junior	D	6' 4" (1.93 m)	190 lb (86 kg)	2002-06-25	Sylvania, Ohio	Amarillo Wranglers (NAHL)	—
15	(Canada)	Quinton Pepper	Senior	F	6' 3" (1.91 m)	187 lb (85 kg)	2002-01-31	London, Ontario	Steinbach Pistons (MJHL)	—
16	(United States)	Bauer Berry	Freshman	D	6' 4" (1.93 m)	218 lb (99 kg)	2005-10-31	Grand Forks, North Dakota	Muskegon Lumberjacks (USHL)	EDM, 218th overall 2024
17	(United States)	Jake Braccini	Senior	F	5' 11" (1.8 m)	192 lb (87 kg)	2001-07-02	Hanover, Minnesota	Muskegon Lumberjacks (USHL)	—
18	(United States)	Josh Giuliani	Freshman	F	6' 1" (1.85 m)	176 lb (80 kg)	2004-06-11	Plymouth, Minnesota	Dubuque Fighting Saints (USHL)	—
19	(United States)	Luc Laylin	Senior	F	5' 8" (1.73 m)	170 lb (77 kg)	2001-12-30	St. Michael, Minnesota	Prince George Spruce Kings (BCHL)	—
20	(United States)	Nick Williams	Junior	D	5' 9" (1.75 m)	174 lb (79 kg)	2002-09-21	Edina, Minnesota	Michigan Tech (CCHA)	—
21	(United States)	Carson Peters	Senior	D	6' 3" (1.91 m)	200 lb (91 kg)	2002-10-28	Medina, Minnesota	Cedar Rapids RoughRiders (USHL)	—
25	(United States)	Attila Lippai	Freshman	F	5' 9" (1.75 m)	181 lb (82 kg)	2004-11-25	Saint Paul, Minnesota	Tri-City Storm (USHL)	—
26	(United States)	Chase Cheslock	Junior	D	6' 3" (1.91 m)	205 lb (93 kg)	2004-10-25	Rogers, Minnesota	Omaha Lancers (USHL)	NJD, 154th overall 2023
27	(United States)	Luke Schelter	Freshman	F	6' 2" (1.88 m)	196 lb (89 kg)	2004-04-06	Centennial, Colorado	Fargo Force (USHL)	—
28	(United States)	Dylan Godbout	Sophomore	F	5' 11" (1.8 m)	185 lb (84 kg)	2004-05-05	Woodbury, Minnesota	Ohio State (Big Ten)	—
29	(Canada)	Nathan Pilling	Freshman	F	6' 4" (1.93 m)	209 lb (95 kg)	2004-06-22	Calgary, Alberta	Seattle Thunderbirds (WHL)	—
31	(Canada)	Aaron Trotter	Senior	G	6' 2" (1.88 m)	170 lb (77 kg)	2001-04-07	Victoria, British Columbia	Prince George Spruce Kings (BCHL)	—
32	(United States)	Carsen Musser	Sophomore	G	6' 4" (1.93 m)	220 lb (100 kg)	2005-05-19	Fairmont, Minnesota	Colorado College (USHL)	UTA, 166th overall 2023
82	(United States)	Charlie Schoen	Junior	F	5' 10" (1.78 m)	161 lb (73 kg)	2001-06-02	Andover, Minnesota	Arizona State (NCHC)	—

== Standings ==
2025–26 Central Collegiate Hockey Association standings
	Conference record										Overall record					
	GP	W	L	T	OTW	OTL	SW	PTS	GF	GA	GP	W	L	T	GF	GA
#14 Minnesota State †*	26	14	7	5	1	2	3	51	71	53	40	22	11	7	111	81
#18 St. Thomas	26	15	7	4	2	1	2	50	89	67	38	21	12	5	131	109
#17 Augustana	26	14	8	4	1	2	3	50	72	49	37	22	11	4	109	74
Michigan Tech	26	16	7	3	3	1	0	49	84	59	39	23	13	3	126	106
Bowling Green	26	15	7	4	3	2	1	49	80	59	36	18	11	7	107	88
Bemidji State	26	11	11	4	5	1	3	36	69	68	36	13	19	4	98	103
Lake Superior State	26	8	16	2	1	4	2	31	57	83	36	11	22	3	92	121
Ferris State	26	6	18	2	1	2	1	22	70	100	37	8	27	2	91	138
Northern Michigan	26	3	21	2	0	2	0	13	44	98	34	3	29	2	56	132
Championship: March 20, 2026 † indicates conference regular-season champion (MacNaughton Cup) * indicates conference tournament champion (Mason Cup); Rankings: USCHO.com Top 20 Poll; updated March 22, 2026; Source: CCHA

== Schedule and results ==
Date	Time	Opponent^{#}	Rank^{#}	Site	TV	Decision	Result	Attendance	Record
Regular Season
October 4	6:07 pm	at St. Cloud State*	#19	Herb Brooks National Hockey Center • St. Cloud, Minnesota	The CW	Musser	W 4–3	3,529	1–0–0
October 10	7:07 pm	at #10 North Dakota*	#19	Ralph Engelstad Arena • Grand Forks, North Dakota	Midco	Musser	L 2–6	11,627	1–1–0
October 12	5:07 pm	vs. #10 North Dakota*	#19	Grand Casino Arena • Saint Paul, Minnesota	Midco Sports+	Musser	L 2–5	6,127	1–2–0
October 17	8:05 pm	at Air Force*		Cadet Ice Arena • Air Force Academy, Colorado	FloHockey	Trotter	W 11–2	2,317	2–2–0
October 18	9:05 pm	at Air Force*		Cadet Ice Arena • Air Force Academy, Colorado	FloHockey	Musser	L 2–6	2,004	2–3–0
October 24	7:07 pm	#15 Providence*		Lee & Penny Anderson Arena • Saint Paul, Minnesota	Midco Sports+	Trotter	T 2–2 ^{OT}	4,325	2–3–1
October 25	7:07 pm	#15 Providence*		Lee & Penny Anderson Arena • Saint Paul, Minnesota	Midco Sports+	Musser	L 4–7	3,313	2–4–1
October 31	7:07 pm	#18 Minnesota State		Lee & Penny Anderson Arena • Saint Paul, Minnesota	Midco Sports+	Ingemann	L 1–3	2,544	2–5–1 (0–1–0)
November 1	6:07 pm	at #18 Minnesota State		Mayo Clinic Health System Event Center • Mankato, Minnesota	Midco Sports+	Ingemann	W 4–3 ^{OT}	4,184	3–5–1 (1–1–0)
November 11	6:07 pm	St. Cloud State*		Lee & Penny Anderson Arena • Saint Paul, Minnesota	Midco Sports+	Ingemann	W 3–1	3,272	4–5–1
November 15	7:07 pm	at Augustana		Midco Arena • Sioux Falls, South Dakota	Midco Sports+	Ingemann	T 4–4 ^{SOL}	3,048	4–5–2 (1–1–1)
November 21	7:07 pm	Bowling Green		Lee & Penny Anderson Arena • Saint Paul, Minnesota	Midco Sports+	Trotter	L 2–3 ^{OT}	2,127	4–6–2 (1–2–1)
November 22	6:07 pm	Bowling Green		Lee & Penny Anderson Arena • Saint Paul, Minnesota	Midco Sports+	Musser	W 6–2	2,485	5–6–2 (2–2–1)
November 28	6:07 pm	at Michigan Tech		MacInnes Student Ice Arena • Houghton, Michigan	Midco Sports+	Musser	T 3–3 ^{SOW}	3,039	5–6–3 (2–2–2)
November 29	5:07 pm	at Michigan Tech		MacInnes Student Ice Arena • Houghton, Michigan	Midco Sports+	Trotter	W 2–1	3,403	6–6–3 (3–2–2)
December 5	7:07 pm	Lake Superior State		Lee & Penny Anderson Arena • Saint Paul, Minnesota	Midco Sports+	Trotter	L 3–5	2,169	6–7–3 (3–3–2)
December 6	6:07 pm	Lake Superior State		Lee & Penny Anderson Arena • Saint Paul, Minnesota	Midco Sports+	Musser	W 4–1	2,012	7–7–3 (4–3–2)
December 12	6:07 pm	at Northern Michigan		Berry Events Center • Marquette, Michigan	Midco Sports+	Musser	W 2–0	2,463	8–7–3 (5–3–2)
December 13	5:07 pm	at Northern Michigan		Berry Events Center • Marquette, Michigan	Midco Sports+	Musser	W 4–3	1,739	9–7–3 (6–3–2)
January 2	7:07 pm	Ferris State		Lee & Penny Anderson Arena • Saint Paul, Minnesota	Midco Sports+	Musser	W 5–3	2,078	10–7–3 (7–3–2)
January 3	8:07 pm	Ferris State		Lee & Penny Anderson Arena • Saint Paul, Minnesota	Midco Sports+	Ingemann	W 8–4	2,258	11–7–3 (8–3–2)
January 10	6:07 pm	at #15 Minnesota State		Mayo Clinic Health System Event Center • Mankato, Minnesota	Midco Sports+	Trotter	W 4–2	4,765	12–7–3 (9–3–2)
January 16	7:07 pm	Bemidji State	#19	Lee & Penny Anderson Arena • Saint Paul, Minnesota	Midco Sports+	Musser	W 5–1	2,426	13–7–3 (10–3–2)
January 17	6:07 pm	Bemidji State	#19	Lee & Penny Anderson Arena • Saint Paul, Minnesota	Midco Sports+	Trotter	W 3–2	2,664	14–7–3 (11–3–2)
January 23	6:07 pm	at Lake Superior State	#16	Taffy Abel Arena • Sault Ste. Marie, Michigan	Midco Sports+	Trotter	W 7–4	1,825	15–7–3 (12–3–2)
January 24	5:07 pm	at Lake Superior State	#16	Taffy Abel Arena • Sault Ste. Marie, Michigan	Midco Sports+	Trotter	W 5–0	1,676	16–7–3 (13–3–2)
January 30	7:07 pm	#19 Michigan Tech	#15	Lee & Penny Anderson Arena • Saint Paul, Minnesota	Midco Sports+	Trotter	W 4–2	2,751	17–7–3 (14–3–2)
January 31	6:07 pm	#19 Michigan Tech	#15	Lee & Penny Anderson Arena • Saint Paul, Minnesota	Midco Sports+	Trotter	L 3–4	2,787	17–8–3 (14–4–2)
February 6	6:07 pm	at Bowling Green	#15	Slater Family Ice Arena • Bowling Green, Ohio	Midco Sports+	Musser	W 3–2 ^{OT}	3,167	18–8–3 (15–4–2)
February 7	6:07 pm	at Bowling Green	#15	Slater Family Ice Arena • Bowling Green, Ohio	Midco Sports+	Trotter	L 1–3	3,167	18–9–3 (15–5–2)
February 20	7:07 pm	#18 Augustana	#15	Lee & Penny Anderson Arena • Saint Paul, Minnesota	Midco Sports+	Musser	T 3–3 ^{SOL}	3,591	18–9–4 (15–5–3)
February 21	6:07 pm	#18 Augustana	#15	Lee & Penny Anderson Arena • Saint Paul, Minnesota	Midco Sports+	Trotter	L 0–4	3,165	18–10–4 (15–6–3)
February 27	7:07 pm	at Bemidji State	#17	Sanford Center • Bemidji, Minnesota	Midco Sports+	Musser	L 1–3	1,764	18–11–4 (15–7–3)
February 28	6:07 pm	at Bemidji State	#17	Sanford Center • Bemidji, Minnesota	Midco Sports+	Musser	T 2–2 ^{SOW}	2,403	18–11–5 (15–7–4)
CCHA Tournament
March 6	7:07 pm	Lake Superior State*	#19	Lee & Penny Anderson Arena • Saint Paul, Minnesota (CCHA Quarterfinal Game 1)	Midco Sports+	Musser	W 4–3 ^{OT}	1,217	19–11–5
March 7	7:07 pm	Lake Superior State*	#19	Lee & Penny Anderson Arena • Saint Paul, Minnesota (CCHA Quarterfinal Game 2)	Midco Sports+	Musser	W 5–2	1,286	20–11–5
March 14	4:07 pm	#13 Augustana*	#18	Lee & Penny Anderson Arena • Saint Paul, Minnesota (CCHA Semifinal)	Midco Sports+	Musser	W 2–1	2,338	21–11–5
March 20	7:07 pm	at #16 Minnesota State*	#15	Mayo Clinic Health System Event Center • Mankato, Minnesota (CCHA Championship)	Midco Sports+	Musser	L 1–4	4,892	21–12–5
*Non-conference game. ^{#}Rankings from USCHO.com Poll. All times are in Central Time. Source:

== Rankings ==
Poll	Week																											
Poll	Pre	1	2	3	4	5	6	7	8	9	10	11	12	13	14	15	16	17	18	19	20	21	22	23	24	25	26	27 (Final)
USCHO.com	19	19	RV	RV	RV	NR	NR	NR	NR	NR	NR	RV	–	RV	RV	19	16	15	15	15	15	17	19	18	15	17	–	18
USA Hockey	20т	19	RV	NR	NR	NR	NR	NR	NR	NR	NR	NR	–	NR	RV	18т	16	15	15	15	15	16	19	17	15	17	19	19

Note: USCHO did not release a poll in week 12 or 26.
Note: USA Hockey did not release a poll in week 12.
