= 2025–26 Bemidji State Beavers men's ice hockey season =

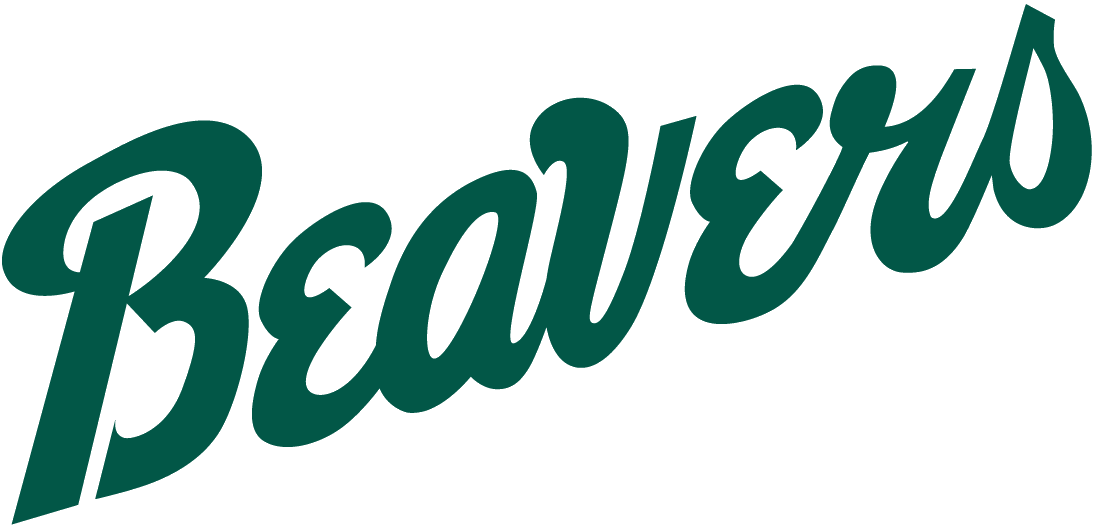
- Conference: 6th CCHA
- Home ice: Sanford Center

Rankings
- USCHO: NR
- USA Hockey: NR

Record
- Overall: 13–19–4
- Conference: 11–11–4
- Home: 8–8–1
- Road: 5–11–3

Coaches and captains
- Head coach: Tom Serratore
- Assistant coaches: Travis Winter; Joe Wegwerth; Jackson Keane
- Captain: Kirklan Irey
- Alternate captain(s): Vincent Corcoran; Adam Flammang; Mitchell Wolfe

The 2025–26 Bemidji State Beavers men's ice hockey season was the 70th season of play for the program, the 26th at the Division I level and 4th in the CCHA. The Beavers represented Bemidji State University, played their home games at Sanford Center and were coached by Tom Serratore in his 25th season.

== Season ==
Looking to rebound from a subpar season in 2025, Bemidji State began the year with a goaltender rotation that produced results early. Alternating between Max Hildebrand and Raythan Robbins, the Beavers got to Thanksgiving with a decent overall record and a stellar mark in conference play. Losing just once in their first 12 CCHA matches, Bemidji State looked to well on their way to competing for an NCAA tournament berth. Oliver Peer, a senior transfer who had helped New Brunswick to a record of 71–1–2 over the previous two seasons, demonstrated that he was just as effective south of the border by leading the team in scoring and accounting for more than one out of every five of BSU's goals. Despite losing both games to North Dakota in their late-November series, Bemidji State had given the nation's then-#6 team all that they could handle but the club went into a steep decline afterwards.

December and January saw the team's scoring dry up with Bemidji State averaging 1.8 goals over a 10-game stretch. Compounding their problems was the decline in goaltending that saw Robbins' play slip so much that Hildebrand was given full control over the Beavers' crease. The 0–10–2 slide in the middle of their season resulted in BSU plummeting down the standings. Things got so bad for the Beavers that they were even shutout by a lowly Northern Michigan squad at the end of January. However, that embarrassing loss seemed to snap the team out of their funk and they responded by winning four of their final seven regular season games, including two victories over ranked teams.

Thanks to their losing streak, Bemidji State finished sixth in the CCHA and they had to travel to face Augustana for their quarterfinal match. After a poor outing by Hildebrand in the first game, the freshman netminder got a reprieve with Bemidji State outshooting the Vikings 43–19 in the rematch. Unfortunately, the Beavers' offense could not break through and their season ended after a 1–2 loss.

== Departures ==
Player	Position	Nationality	Cause
Rhys Chiddenton	Forward	Canada	Transferred to Canisius
Tony Follmer	Defenseman	United States	Graduation (signed with Orlando Solar Bears)
Austin Jouppi	Forward	United States	Graduation (retired)
Jackson Jutting	Forward	United States	Graduation (signed with Kansas City Mavericks)
Donte Lawson	Forward	United States	Graduation (signed with Dunaújvárosi Acélbikák)
William Magnuson	Defenseman	United States	Graduation (signed with Norfolk Admirals)
Eric Martin	Forward	Canada	Graduation (signed with Indy Fuel)
Carter Randklev	Forward	United States	Graduation (signed with Wichita Thunder)
Mattias Sholl	Goaltender	United States	Graduation (signed with Greenville Swamp Rabbits)
Jere Väisänen	Forward	Finland	Graduation (signed with Kiekko-Espoo)

== Recruiting ==
Player	Position	Nationality	Age	Notes
Max Hildebrand	Goaltender	Canada	21	Martensville, SK
Oscar Karlsson	Forward	Sweden	20	Linköping, SWE
Vincent Labelle	Forward	Canada	23	Ottawa, ON; transfer from Ottawa
Connor McClennon	Forward	Canada	23	Wainwright, AB; transfer from Alberta; selected 178th overall in 2020
Max Namestnikov	Forward	United States	21	Wolverine, MI
Oliver Peer	Forward	Canada	22	Burlington, ON; transfer from New Brunswick
Hudson Thornton	Defenseman	Canada	21	Winnipeg, MB
Maxon Vig	Defenseman	United States	19	Bismarck, ND; selected 209th overall in 2025
Ben Vigneault	Defenseman	Canada	21	Boischâtel, QC
Vann Yuhas	Forward	Canada	21	Medicine Hat, AB; transfer from Merrimack

== Roster ==
As of August 29, 2025.

No.	Nat.	Player	Class	Pos	Height	Weight	DoB	Hometown	Previous team	NHL rights
1	(Canada)	Max Hildebrand	Freshman	G	6' 1" (1.85 m)	187 lb (85 kg)	2004-06-29	Martensville, Saskatchewan	Prince Albert Raiders (WHL)	—
2	(United States)	Maxon Vig	Freshman	D	6' 2" (1.88 m)	212 lb (96 kg)	2005-11-17	Bismarck, North Dakota	Cedar Rapids RoughRiders (USHL)	MTL, 209th overall 2025
4	(Finland)	Patrik Satosaari	Senior	D	6' 0" (1.83 m)	180 lb (82 kg)	2001-06-18	Jyväskylä, Finland	Lahti Pelicans U20 (U20 SM-sarja)	—
5	(Canada)	Hudson Thornton	Freshman	D	5' 11" (1.8 m)	192 lb (87 kg)	2003-11-04	Winnipeg, Manitoba	Orlando Solar Bears (ECHL)	—
6	(United States)	Mitch Wolfe (A)	Senior	D	6' 0" (1.83 m)	183 lb (83 kg)	2002-07-19	Andover, Minnesota	Des Moines Buccaneers (USHL)	—
7	(Canada)	Isa Parekh	Sophomore	D	6' 0" (1.83 m)	157 lb (71 kg)	2003-09-27	Toronto, Ontario	Nanaimo Clippers (BCHL)	—
8	(Canada)	Vincent Labelle	Junior	F	6' 0" (1.83 m)	168 lb (76 kg)	2002-09-03	Ottawa, Ontario	Ottawa (OUA)	—
9	(United States)	Jaksen Panzer	Sophomore	F	5' 10" (1.78 m)	170 lb (77 kg)	2004-04-08	Grand Forks, North Dakota	Sioux Falls Stampede (USHL)	—
11	(United States)	Adam Flammang (A)	Senior	F	6' 0" (1.83 m)	187 lb (85 kg)	2001-11-09	St. Michael, Minnesota	Cedar Rapids RoughRiders (USHL)	—
12	(Canada)	A. J. Macaulay	Senior	D	5' 9" (1.75 m)	175 lb (79 kg)	2002-04-12	Bonnyville, Alberta	Alaska (NCAA)	—
13	(Canada)	Ben Vigneault	Freshman	D	6' 0" (1.83 m)	181 lb (82 kg)	2004-06-04	Boischâtel, Quebec	Québec Remparts (QMJHL)	—
14	(Canada)	Alexi Sylvestre	Sophomore	F	6' 2" (1.88 m)	194 lb (88 kg)	2004-08-27	Sainte-Martine, Quebec	Flin Flon Bombers (SJHL)	—
15	(Canada)	Connor McClennon	Junior	F	5' 8" (1.73 m)	163 lb (74 kg)	2002-06-25	Wainwright, Alberta	Alberta (CWUAA)	PHI, 178th overall 2020
16	(Sweden)	Oscar Karlsson	Freshman	F	6' 2" (1.88 m)	179 lb (81 kg)	2005-07-18	Linköping, Sweden	Linköping HC J20 (J20 Nationell)	—
17	(Canada)	Noah Quinn	Junior	F	6' 1" (1.85 m)	173 lb (78 kg)	2003-06-02	Nelson, British Columbia	Cranbrook Bucks (BCHL)	—
18	(United States)	Max Namestnikov	Freshman	F	5' 8" (1.73 m)	183 lb (83 kg)	2004-02-06	Wolverine, Michigan	Guelph Storm (OHL)	—
19	(Canada)	Vann Yuhas	Sophomore	F	6' 0" (1.83 m)	174 lb (79 kg)	2004-02-20	Medicine Hat, Alberta	Drumheller Dragons (AJHL)	—
20	(United States)	Kirklan Irey (C)	Senior	F	5' 11" (1.8 m)	172 lb (78 kg)	2001-01-08	Bismarck, North Dakota	Sioux City Musketeers (USHL)	—
21	(United States)	Vince Corcoran (A)	Senior	F	5' 8" (1.73 m)	165 lb (75 kg)	2001-09-21	Plainfield, Illinois	Wichita Falls Warriors (NAHL)	—
22	(Canada)	Oliver Peer	Sophomore	F	6' 0" (1.83 m)	170 lb (77 kg)	2003-03-09	Burlington, Ontario	New Brunswick (AUS)	—
23	(United States)	Luke Roelofs	Sophomore	D	6' 2" (1.88 m)	192 lb (87 kg)	2003-03-17	Minnetrista, Minnesota	Bismarck Bobcats (NAHL)	—
25	(United States)	Tory Lund	Sophomore	F	5' 10" (1.78 m)	185 lb (84 kg)	2004-07-30	Sartell, Minnesota	El Paso Rhinos (NAHL)	—
26	(Canada)	Reilly Funk	Senior (RS)	F	6' 3" (1.91 m)	194 lb (88 kg)	2000-12-23	Portage, Manitoba	Northern Michigan (CCHA)	—
27	(Canada)	Jake McLean	Junior	F	6' 0" (1.83 m)	183 lb (83 kg)	2002-07-27	North Vancouver, British Columbia	Bismarck Bobcats (NAHL)	—
28	(Norway)	Kasper Magnussen	Junior	F	6' 1" (1.85 m)	196 lb (89 kg)	2004-02-19	Fredrikstad, Norway	Leksands IF J20 (J20 Nationell)	—
29	(Canada)	Ryan Henderson	Sophomore	D	6' 2" (1.88 m)	170 lb (77 kg)	2004-06-10	Lethbridge, Alberta	Drumheller Dragons (USHL)	—
33	(United States)	Trent Wiemken	Sophomore	G	6' 0" (1.83 m)	170 lb (77 kg)	2004-03-23	Fargo, North Dakota	Austin Bruins (NAHL)	—
35	(United States)	Raythan Robbins	Junior	G	5' 11" (1.8 m)	187 lb (85 kg)	2002-06-05	Anchorage, Alaska	Muskegon Lumberjacks (USHL)	—

== Standings ==
2025–26 Central Collegiate Hockey Association standings
	Conference record										Overall record					
	GP	W	L	T	OTW	OTL	SW	PTS	GF	GA	GP	W	L	T	GF	GA
#14 Minnesota State †*	26	14	7	5	1	2	3	51	71	53	40	22	11	7	111	81
#18 St. Thomas	26	15	7	4	2	1	2	50	89	67	38	21	12	5	131	109
#17 Augustana	26	14	8	4	1	2	3	50	72	49	37	22	11	4	109	74
Michigan Tech	26	16	7	3	3	1	0	49	84	59	39	23	13	3	126	106
Bowling Green	26	15	7	4	3	2	1	49	80	59	36	18	11	7	107	88
Bemidji State	26	11	11	4	5	1	3	36	69	68	36	13	19	4	98	103
Lake Superior State	26	8	16	2	1	4	2	31	57	83	36	11	22	3	92	121
Ferris State	26	6	18	2	1	2	1	22	70	100	37	8	27	2	91	138
Northern Michigan	26	3	21	2	0	2	0	13	44	98	34	3	29	2	56	132
Championship: March 20, 2026 † indicates conference regular-season champion (MacNaughton Cup) * indicates conference tournament champion (Mason Cup); Rankings: USCHO.com Top 20 Poll; updated March 22, 2026; Source: CCHA

== Schedule and results ==
Date	Time	Opponent^{#}	Rank^{#}	Site	TV	Decision	Result	Attendance	Record
Regular Season
October 3	10:00 pm	Alaska Anchorage*		Avis Alaska Sports Complex • Anchorage, Alaska		Robbins	W 9–2	775	1–0–0
October 4	8:00 pm	Alaska Anchorage*		Avis Alaska Sports Complex • Anchorage, Alaska		Hildebrand	W 5–0	651	2–0–0
October 10	7:07 pm	St. Cloud State*		Sanford Center • Bemidji, Minnesota	Midco Sports+	Robbins	L 2–3	2,456	2–1–0
October 11	6:07 pm	at St. Cloud State*		Herb Brooks National Hockey Center • St. Cloud, Minnesota	The CW	Hildebrand	L 2–4	3,345	2–2–0
October 17	7:07 pm	Minnesota Duluth*		Sanford Center • Bemidji, Minnesota	Midco Sports+, My9	Hildebrand	L 3–7	2,694	2–3–0
October 18	6:07 pm	Minnesota Duluth*		AMSOIL Arena • Duluth, Minnesota	My9	Hildebrand	L 1–5	5,232	2–4–0
October 24	7:07 pm	Augustana		Sanford Center • Bemidji, Minnesota	Midco Sports+	Robbins	W 1–0 ^{OT}	2,818	3–4–0 (1–0–0)
October 25	6:07 pm	Augustana		Sanford Center • Bemidji, Minnesota	Midco Sports+	Hildebrand	W 3–2	2,613	4–4–0 (2–0–0)
October 31	6:07 pm	at Bowling Green		Slater Family Ice Arena • Bowling Green, Ohio	Midco Sports+	Robbins	T 4–4 ^{SOW}	1,863	4–4–1 (2–0–1)
November 1	5:07 pm	at Bowling Green		Slater Family Ice Arena • Bowling Green, Ohio	Midco Sports+	Hildebrand	W 3–2 ^{OT}	2,189	5–4–1 (3–0–1)
November 7	7:07 pm	Lake Superior State		Sanford Center • Bemidji, Minnesota	Midco Sports+	Robbins	W 4–1	2,137	6–4–1 (4–0–1)
November 8	6:07 pm	Lake Superior State		Sanford Center • Bemidji, Minnesota	Midco Sports+	Hildebrand	W 3–2 ^{OT}	2,263	7–4–1 (5–0–1)
November 14	6:07 pm	at Michigan Tech		MacInnes Student Ice Arena • Houghton, Michigan	Midco Sports+	Robbins	T 2–2 ^{SOW}	2,893	7–4–2 (5–0–2)
November 15	5:07 pm	at Michigan Tech		MacInnes Student Ice Arena • Houghton, Michigan	Midco Sports+	Hildebrand	L 1–2 ^{OT}	3,026	7–5–2 (5–1–2)
November 21	7:07 pm	Northern Michigan		Sanford Center • Bemidji, Minnesota	Midco Sports+	Robbins	W 7–3	2,032	8–5–2 (6–1–2)
November 22	6:07 pm	Northern Michigan		Sanford Center • Bemidji, Minnesota	Midco Sports+	Robbins	W 6–2	2,417	9–5–2 (7–1–2)
November 28	7:37 pm	#6 North Dakota*		Sanford Center • Bemidji, Minnesota	Midco Sports+	Robbins	L 3–5	4,243	9–6–2
November 29	6:07 pm	at #6 North Dakota*		Ralph Engelstad Arena • Grand Forks, North Dakota	Midco, TSN2	Hildebrand	L 1–2 ^{OT}	11,573	9–7–2
December 5	7:07 pm	at Augustana		Midco Arena • Sioux Falls, South Dakota	Midco Sports+	Robbins	L 1–3	2,540	9–8–2 (7–2–2)
December 7	7:07 pm	at Augustana		Midco Arena • Sioux Falls, South Dakota	Midco Sports+	Hildebrand	T 4–4 ^{SOW}	2,290	9–8–3 (7–2–3)
January 2	7:07 pm	Minnesota*		Sanford Center • Bemidji, Minnesota (Exhibition)	Midco Sports+, Fox9+	Hildebrand	T 3–3 ^{SOW}	4,231	
January 9	7:07 pm	Michigan Tech		Sanford Center • Bemidji, Minnesota	Midco Sports+	Robbins	L 2–5	2,103	9–9–3 (7–3–3)
January 10	6:07 pm	Michigan Tech		Sanford Center • Bemidji, Minnesota	Midco Sports+	Hildebrand	L 3–4	1,793	9–10–3 (7–4–3)
January 16	7:07 pm	at #19 St. Thomas		Lee & Penny Anderson Arena • Saint Paul, Minnesota	Midco Sports+	Robbins	L 1–5	2,426	9–11–3 (7–5–3)
January 17	6:07 pm	at #19 St. Thomas		Lee & Penny Anderson Arena • Saint Paul, Minnesota	Midco Sports+	Hildebrand	L 2–3	2,664	9–12–3 (7–6–3)
January 23	7:07 pm	Bowling Green		Sanford Center • Bemidji, Minnesota	Midco Sports+	Hildebrand	L 1–3	1,727	9–13–3 (7–7–3)
January 24	6:07 pm	Bowling Green		Sanford Center • Bemidji, Minnesota	Midco Sports+	Hildebrand	L 1–5	1,888	9–14–3 (7–8–3)
January 30	6:07 pm	at Northern Michigan		Berry Events Center • Marquette, Michigan	Midco Sports+	Hildebrand	L 0–2	2,331	9–15–3 (7–9–3)
January 31	5:07 pm	at Northern Michigan		Berry Events Center • Marquette, Michigan	Midco Sports+	Hildebrand	W 7–1	2,460	10–15–3 (8–9–3)
February 6	6:07 pm	Ferris State		Sanford Center • Bemidji, Minnesota	Midco Sports+	Hildebrand	L 3–6	1,593	10–16–3 (8–10–3)
February 7	5:07 pm	Ferris State		Sanford Center • Bemidji, Minnesota	Midco Sports+	Hildebrand	W 4–3 ^{OT}	1,951	11–16–3 (9–10–3)
February 13	7:07 pm	at #16 Minnesota State		Mayo Clinic Health System Event Center • Mankato, Minnesota	Midco Sports+	Hildebrand	L 0–1	4,101	11–17–3 (9–11–3)
February 14	6:07 pm	at #16 Minnesota State		Mayo Clinic Health System Event Center • Mankato, Minnesota	Midco Sports+	Hildebrand	W 1–0 ^{OT}	4,415	12–17–3 (10–11–3)
February 27	7:07 pm	#17 St. Thomas		Sanford Center • Bemidji, Minnesota	Midco Sports+	Hildebrand	W 3–1	1,764	13–17–3 (11–11–3)
February 28	6:07 pm	#17 St. Thomas		Sanford Center • Bemidji, Minnesota	Midco Sports+	Hildebrand	T 2–2 ^{SOL}	2,403	13–17–4 (11–11–4)
CCHA Tournament
March 6	7:07 pm	at #15 Augustana*		Midco Arena • Sioux Falls, South Dakota (CCHA Quarterfinal Game 1)	Midco Sports+	Hildebrand	L 2–5	3,082	13–18–4
March 7	6:07 pm	at #15 Augustana*		Midco Arena • Sioux Falls, South Dakota (CCHA Quarterfinal Game 2)	Midco Sports+	Hildebrand	L 1–2	3,082	13–19–4
*Non-conference game. ^{#}Rankings from USCHO.com Poll. All times are in Central Time. Source:

== Scoring statistics ==
Name	Position	Games	Goals	Assists	Points	PIM
Oliver Peer	C/RW	34	20	16	36	30
Kasper Magnussen	LW	36	10	21	31	8
Adam Flammang	RW	29	8	20	28	34
Reilly Funk	C	36	12	8	20	26
Connor McClennon	RW	36	11	7	18	29
Hudson Thornton	D	36	2	16	18	30
Max Namestnikov	LW/RW	34	5	10	15	10
Jake McLean	F	33	5	8	13	4
Vincent Labelle	C	30	3	7	10	22
Kirklan Irey	F	36	1	9	10	14
Vann Yuhas	F	28	2	6	8	7
Maxon Vig	D	36	6	1	7	22
Mitch Wolfe	D	36	2	5	7	16
Vince Corcoran	D	32	1	6	7	8
Tory Lund	F	24	4	2	6	0
Luke Roelofs	D	34	2	4	6	12
Noah Quinn	F	22	1	5	6	8
Alexi Sylvestre	C/LW	21	1	4	5	4
Jaksen Panzer	F	32	0	5	5	2
Patrik Satosaari	D	15	1	1	2	0
Ryan Henderson	D	11	0	2	2	6
Isa Parekh	D	27	0	2	2	12
Ben Vigneault	D	15	1	0	1	8
Max Hildebrand	G	24	0	1	1	0
Trent Wiemken	G	3	0	0	0	0
Oscar Karlsson	C/W	3	0	0	0	0
A. J. Macaulay	D	8	0	0	0	0
Raythan Robbins	G	12	0	0	0	0
Total			98	166	264	316

== Goaltending statistics ==
Name	Games	Minutes	Wins	Losses	Ties	Goals Against	Saves	Shut Outs	SV %	GAA
Trent Wiemken	3	68:02	0	0	0	2	17	0	.895	1.76
Raythan Robbins	12	724:58	5	5	2	32	263	1	.892	2.65
Max Hildebrand	24	1372:22	8	14	2	62	530	2	.895	2.71
Empty Net	-	27:57	-	-	-	7	-	-	-	-
Total	36	2193:19	13	19	4	103	810	3	.887	2.82

== Rankings ==
Poll	Week																											
Poll	Pre	1	2	3	4	5	6	7	8	9	10	11	12	13	14	15	16	17	18	19	20	21	22	23	24	25	26	27 (Final)
USCHO.com	RV	RV	NR	NR	RV	NR	RV	RV	RV	RV	RV	RV	–	RV	RV	RV	RV	RV	NR	NR	NR	NR	NR	NR	NR	NR	NR	NR
USA Hockey	RV	RV	NR	NR	NR	NR	NR	NR	RV	RV	RV	RV	–	NR	RV	RV	RV	RV	NR	NR	NR	NR	NR	NR	NR	NR	NR	NR

Note: USCHO did not release a poll in week 12.
Note: USA Hockey did not release a poll in week 12.
