= 2025–26 CCHA season =

- Season: 2025–26
- Conference: CCHA
- Division: Division I
- Sport: ice hockey
- Duration: October 3, 2025– March 21, 2026
- Number of teams: 9
- TV partner(s): Midco Sports+

NHL Entry Draft

Regular season
- Season champions: Minnesota State
- Top scorer: Stiven Sardarian

CCHA tournament

NCAA tournament

The 2025–26 CCHA season will be the 47th season of play for the Central Collegiate Hockey Association and take place during the 2025–26 NCAA Division I men's ice hockey season. The season will begin on October 3, 2025, and the conference tournament is set to concluded on March 21, 2026.

== Coaches ==
- Following the retirement of Bob Daniels after 33 years, Ferris State hired Brett Riley as the program's new coach.
- After Joe Shawhan stepped down as Michigan Tech's head coach, the program hired Bill Muckalt for the same position.

=== Records ===
Team	Head coach	Season at school	Record at school	CCHA record
Augustana	Garrett Raboin	3	30–31–8	9–5–2
Bemidji State	Tom Serratore	25	403–378–104	51–44–7
Bowling Green	Dennis Williams	3	23–39–10	16–28–10
Ferris State	Brett Riley	1	0–0–0	0–0–0
Lake Superior State	Damon Whitten	12	155–218–33	42–57–3
Michigan Tech	Bill Muckalt	1	0–0–0	0–0–0
Minnesota State	Luke Strand	3	45–24–7	30–15–5
Northern Michigan	Dave Shyiak	2	5–27–2	4–20–2
St. Thomas	Enrico Blasi	5	48–89–9	38–56–8

== Preseason ==
Coaches and members of the media were polled separately prior to the season and asked to both rank member programs as well as vote for an all-conference team, player of the year and rookie of the year. Coaches were not permitted to vote for their own players or teams

=== Coaches ===
==== Preseason Poll ====
Rank	Team
1	St. Thomas (3)
2	Minnesota State (4)
3	Michigan Tech (2)
4	Augustana
5	Bowling Green
6	Bemidji State
7	Lake Superior State
8	Ferris State
9	Northern Michigan

==== Preseason All-CCHA ====
First Team	Position
Alex Tracy, Minnesota State	G
Evan Murr *, Minnesota State	D
Isa Parekh, Bemidji State	D
Lucas Wahlin *, St. Thomas	F
Isaac Gordon, Michigan Tech	F
Stiven Sardarian, Michigan Tech	F

* Unanimous.

==== Preseason Awards ====
Award	Player
Player of the Year	Lucas Wahlin, St. Thomas
Rookie of the Year	Nathan Pilling, St. Thomas
Rookie of the Year	Dominik Rymon, Bowling Green

=== Media ===
==== Preseason Poll ====
Rank	Team
1	Minnesota State (8)
2	St. Thomas (2)
3	Bowling Green (4)
4	Michigan Tech
5	Augustana
6	Bemidji State
7	Ferris State
8	Lake Superior State
9	Northern Michigan

==== Preseason All-CCHA ====
First Team	Position
Alex Tracy *, Minnesota State	G
Evan Murr *, Minnesota State	D
Isa Parekh, Bemidji State	D
Stiven Sardarian, Michigan Tech	F
Lucas Wahlin, St. Thomas	F
Brody Waters, Bowling Green	F

* Unanimous.

==== Preseason Awards ====
Award	Player
Player of the Year	Alex Tracy, Minnesota State
Rookie of the Year	Max Hildenbrand, Bemidji State
Rookie of the Year	Max Vig, Bemidji State

== Standings ==
2025–26 Central Collegiate Hockey Association standings
	Conference record										Overall record					
	GP	W	L	T	OTW	OTL	SW	PTS	GF	GA	GP	W	L	T	GF	GA
#14 Minnesota State †*	26	14	7	5	1	2	3	51	71	53	40	22	11	7	111	81
#18 St. Thomas	26	15	7	4	2	1	2	50	89	67	38	21	12	5	131	109
#17 Augustana	26	14	8	4	1	2	3	50	72	49	37	22	11	4	109	74
Michigan Tech	26	16	7	3	3	1	0	49	84	59	39	23	13	3	126	106
Bowling Green	26	15	7	4	3	2	1	49	80	59	36	18	11	7	107	88
Bemidji State	26	11	11	4	5	1	3	36	69	68	36	13	19	4	98	103
Lake Superior State	26	8	16	2	1	4	2	31	57	83	36	11	22	3	92	121
Ferris State	26	6	18	2	1	2	1	22	70	100	37	8	27	2	91	138
Northern Michigan	26	3	21	2	0	2	0	13	44	98	34	3	29	2	56	132
Championship: March 20, 2026 † indicates conference regular-season champion (MacNaughton Cup) * indicates conference tournament champion (Mason Cup); Rankings: USCHO.com Top 20 Poll; updated March 22, 2026; Source: CCHA

== Non-Conference record ==
Team	AHA	Big Ten	ECAC Hockey	Hockey East	Independent	NCHC	Total
Augustana	0–0–0	0–0–0	0–0–0	0–0–0	0–0–0	6–2–0	6–2–0
Bemidji State	0–0–0	0–0–0	0–0–0	0–0–0	2–0–0	0–6–0	2–6–0
Bowling Green	0–2–0	1–0–3	2–0–0	0–0–0	0–0–0	0–0–0	3–2–3
Ferris State	0–0–0	0–1–0	0–0–0	0–0–0	0–2–0	1–4–0	1–7–0
Lake Superior State	0–0–0	0–1–0	1–0–1	0–1–0	2–2–0	0–0–0	3–4–1
Michigan Tech	0–1–0	1–2–0	1–1–0	0–0–0	2–1–0	1–0–0	5–5–0
Minnesota State	0–0–0	0–0–2	3–0–0	0–1–0	0–0–0	1–1–0	4–2–2
Northern Michigan	0–0–0	0–4–0	0–0–0	0–2–0	0–0–0	0–2–0	0–8–0
St. Thomas	1–1–0	0–0–0	0–0–0	0–1–1	0–0–0	2–2–0	3–4–1
Overall	1–4–0	2–8–5	7–1–1	0–5–1	6–5–0	11–17–0	27–40–7

== Conference Tournament ==
Quarterfinals; March 6–8
1	Minnesota State	5	1	2
8	Ferris State	1	2*	0
2	St. Thomas	4*	5	—
7	Lake Superior State	3	2	—
(Teams are reseeded after the Quarterfinal round)
3	Augustana	5	2	—
6	Bemidji State	2	1	—
4	Michigan Tech	5	3	—
5	Bowling Green	3	2	—

Semifinals; March 14
1	Minnesota State	7
4	Michigan Tech	2
2	St. Thomas	2
3	Augustana	1

Championship; March 20
1	Minnesota State	4
2	St. Thomas	1

Note: * denotes overtime period(s)

== Ranking ==
=== USCHO ===
Team	Pre	1	2	3	4	5	6	7	8	9	10	12	13	14	15	16	17	18	19	20	21	22	23	24	25	Final
Augustana	NR	NR	NR	NR	NR	NR	NR	NR	NR	NR	NR	NR	NR	17	15	14	16	16	18	18	15	15	13	18	18	–
Bemidji State	NR	NR	NR	NR	NR	NR	NR	NR	NR	NR	NR	NR	NR	NR	NR	NR	NR	NR	NR	NR	NR	NR	NR	NR	NR	–
Bowling Green	NR	NR	NR	NR	NR	NR	NR	NR	NR	NR	NR	NR	NR	NR	NR	NR	NR	NR	NR	NR	NR	NR	NR	NR	NR	–
Ferris State	NR	NR	NR	NR	NR	NR	NR	NR	NR	NR	NR	NR	NR	NR	NR	NR	NR	NR	NR	NR	NR	NR	NR	NR	NR	–
Lake Superior State	NR	NR	NR	NR	NR	NR	NR	NR	NR	NR	NR	NR	NR	NR	NR	NR	NR	NR	NR	NR	NR	NR	NR	NR	NR	–
Michigan Tech	NR	NR	NR	NR	NR	NR	NR	NR	NR	NR	NR	NR	NR	NR	NR	19	19	20	17	16	16	20	19	NR	NR	–
Minnesota State	18	20	20	20	18	16	16	14	14	13	14	15	14	15	17	20	18	17	16	17	18	16	16	16	14	–
Northern Michigan	NR	NR	NR	NR	NR	NR	NR	NR	NR	NR	NR	NR	NR	NR	NR	NR	NR	NR	NR	NR	NR	NR	NR	NR	NR	–
St. Thomas	19	19	NR	NR	NR	NR	NR	NR	NR	NR	NR	NR	NR	NR	19	16	15	15	15	15	17	19	18	15	17	–

Note: USCHO did not release a poll in week 12 or 26.

=== USA Hockey ===
Team	Pre	1	2	3	4	5	6	7	8	9	10	11	13	14	15	16	17	18	19	20	21	22	23	24	25	26	Final
Augustana	NR	NR	NR	NR	NR	NR	NR	NR	NR	NR	NR	20	NR	18	15	14	16	16	18	18	15	14	13	18	18	17	–
Bemidji State	NR	NR	NR	NR	NR	NR	NR	NR	NR	NR	NR	NR	NR	NR	NR	NR	NR	NR	NR	NR	NR	NR	NR	NR	NR	NR	–
Bowling Green	NR	NR	NR	NR	NR	NR	NR	NR	NR	NR	NR	NR	NR	NR	NR	NR	NR	NR	NR	20	NR	NR	NR	NR	NR	NR	–
Ferris State	NR	NR	NR	NR	NR	NR	NR	NR	NR	NR	NR	NR	NR	NR	NR	NR	NR	NR	NR	NR	NR	NR	NR	NR	NR	NR	–
Lake Superior State	NR	NR	NR	NR	NR	NR	NR	NR	NR	NR	NR	NR	NR	NR	NR	NR	NR	NR	NR	NR	NR	NR	NR	NR	NR	NR	–
Michigan Tech	NR	NR	NR	NR	NR	NR	NR	NR	NR	NR	NR	NR	NR	NR	NR	19	20	20	17	16	17	NR	19	20	NR	NR	–
Minnesota State	18	20	19	20	19	18	18	14	14	13	14	14	14	15	17	20	18	17	16	17	18	16	18	16	14	14	–
Northern Michigan	NR	NR	NR	NR	NR	NR	NR	NR	NR	NR	NR	NR	NR	NR	NR	NR	NR	NR	NR	NR	NR	NR	NR	NR	NR	NR	–
St. Thomas	20	19	NR	NR	NR	NR	NR	NR	NR	NR	NR	NR	NR	NR	18	16	15	15	15	15	16	19	17	15	17	19	–

Note: USA Hockey did not release a poll in week 12.

=== NPI ===
Team	1	2	3	4	5	6	7	8	9	10	11	13	14	15	16	17	18	19	20	21	22	23	24	Final
Augustana	–	–	6	–	–	15	17	18	21	13	11	13	12	14	16	15	17	17	17	14	13	16	14	–
Bemidji State	–	–	49	–	–	30	27	26	26	28	25	28	38	44	46	47	50	49	49	46	50	49	48	–
Bowling Green	–	–	54	–	–	33	22	22	16	29	31	26	22	27	20	23	22	19	20	19	22	21	23	–
Ferris State	–	–	27	–	–	55	58	57	58	55	58	59	60	56	56	58	57	57	56	56	56	56	56	–
Lake Superior State	–	–	38	–	–	51	52	49	46	44	45	49	51	51	51	51	51	51	50	51	53	53	53	–
Michigan Tech	–	–	32	–	–	18	26	31	38	35	33	31	25	18	24	20	18	18	18	22	19	20	20	–
Minnesota State	–	–	2	–	–	10	11	7	6	9	10	14	16	21	18	17	16	16	15	16	17	17	13	–
Northern Michigan	–	–	51	–	–	62	62	62	62	61	61	61	61	61	60	60	60	61	62	61	60	60	60	–
St. Thomas	–	–	39	–	–	38	33	27	18	23	20	19	14	13	11	13	12	13	16	17	15	14	15	–

Note: teams ranked in the top-10 automatically qualify for the NCAA tournament. Teams ranked 11-16 can qualify based upon conference tournament results.
