= 2025–26 Northern Michigan Wildcats men's ice hockey season =

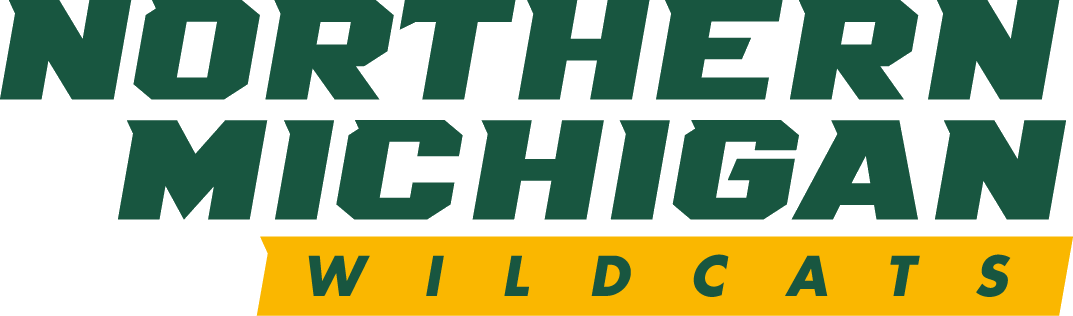
- Conference: 9th CCHA
- Home ice: Berry Events Center

Rankings
- USCHO: NR
- USA Hockey: NR

Record
- Overall: 3–29–2
- Conference: 3–21–2
- Home: 1–15–0
- Road: 2–14–2

Coaches and captains
- Head coach: Dave Shyiak
- Assistant coaches: Andy Contois; Phil Fox; Ben Russell
- Captain(s): Nicolas Ardanaz; Tynan Ewart
- Alternate captain(s): Zane Demsey; Caiden Gault

The 2025–26 Northern Michigan Wildcats men's ice hockey season was the 50th season of play for the program and 28th in the CCHA. The Wildcats represented Northern Michigan University in the 2025–26 NCAA Division I men's ice hockey season, played their home games at Berry Events Center and were coached by Dave Shyiak in his 2nd season.

== Season ==
After a miserable season in 2025, Northern Michigan was hoping so see some improvement in its ice hockey team. Unfortunately, the Wildcats somehow found a way to produce even worse results. In the first two months of the campaign, neither Oliver Auyeung-Ashton nor William Gramme played particularly well in goal but the club's chances at winning were harmed more by its inept offense. NMU averaged well below 2 goals over the first 16 games, losing every contest along the way. The only scoring threat for the Wildcats came in the form of senior transfer Caiden Gault who provided more than a quarter of the team's goals. Even after securing their first win of the season at the beginning of December, NMU immediately went into the tank again and lost the next eight games. The offense finally began to show some signs of life near the end of the year but by then it was far too late to save their season. Auyeung-Ashton, in his first year of college hockey, also showed some marked improvement as the year went on and provided the only shutout of the campaign. Northern Michigan finished with just 3 wins on the year, the lowest in the nation, and the worst record in the history of the program.

== Departures ==
Player	Position	Nationality	Cause
Ethan Barwick	Goaltender	Canada	Left program (retired)
Colby Browne	Forward	United States	Transferred to Colby
Will Diamond	Forward	United States	Left program (retired)
Wolfgang Govedaris	Defenseman	United States	Left program (retired)
Rasmus Larsson	Defenseman	Sweden	Transferred to Robert Morris
Tanner Latsch	Forward	United States	Left program (retired)
Jakub Lewandowski	Forward	Poland	Graduation (signed with KH Energa Toruń)
Zach Michaelis	Forward	United States	Left program (retired)
Trevor Mitchell	Defenseman	United States	Left program (retired)
Julian Molinaro	Goaltender	Canada	Transferred to Michigan
Ryan Ouellette	Goaltender	United States	Graduation (signed with Indy Fuel)
Jakob Peterson	Defenseman	United States	Graduation (retired)
Brendan Poshak	Forward	United States	Left program (retired)
Billy Renfrew	Forward	United States	Transferred to Stonehill
Matthew Romer	Forward	United States	Transferred to Stonehill

== Recruiting ==
Player	Position	Nationality	Age	Notes
Oliver Auyeung-Ashton	Goaltender	Canada	20	Coquitlam, BC
Olivier Beaulieu	Defenseman	Canada	20	Terrebonne, QC; joined mid-season
Kyle Bettens	Forward	Canada	24	Winnipeg, MB; transfer from Minnesota Duluth
Mikey Burchill	Forward	United States	20	Mundelein, IL
Peter Císar	Forward	Slovakia	20	Bratislava, SVK
Warren Clark	Defenseman	Canada	21	Riverside, ON; transfer from St. Cloud State; selected 179th overall in 2023
Zane Demsey	Defenseman	United States	23	Harrison Township, MI; transfer from Miami
Jackson Fuller	Goaltender	United States	21	Centerville, MN
Caiden Gault	Forward	Canada	23	Oakbank, MB; transfer from Ferris State
William Gramme	Goaltender	Sweden	23	Stockholm, SWE; transfer from Wisconsin
Evan Johnson	Defenseman	United States	20	Trenton, MI
Landon MacDonald	Forward	United States	21	Brighton, MI
Tobias Pitka	Forward	Slovakia	19	Poprad, SVK
Ģirts Silkalns	Forward	Latvia	22	Talsi, LAT; transfer from Massachusetts Lowell
Tyler Stern	Forward	United States	21	Plainview, NY
Mathew Ward	Forward	Canada	21	Kamloops, BC
Max Weilandt	Goaltender	United States	20	Northbrook, IL; joined mid-season

== Roster ==
As of January 1, 2026.

No.	Nat.	Player	Class	Pos	Height	Weight	DoB	Hometown	Previous team	NHL rights
1	(Sweden)	William Gramme	Junior	G	6' 4" (1.93 m)	201 lb (91 kg)	2002-05-24	Stockholm, Sweden	Wisconsin (Big Ten)	—
2	(United States)	Joe Schiller	Sophomore	D	6' 0" (1.83 m)	190 lb (86 kg)	2004-09-23	Moorhead, Minnesota	Cedar Rapids RoughRiders (USHL)	—
3	(Canada)	Nick Ardanaz (C)	Senior	D	5' 10" (1.78 m)	185 lb (84 kg)	2002-05-30	Surrey, British Columbia	Rensselaer (ECAC)	—
4	(Canada)	Warren Clark	Junior	D	6' 3" (1.91 m)	195 lb (88 kg)	2004-08-31	Riverside, Ontario	St. Cloud State (NCHC)	TBL, 179th overall 2023
5	(United States)	Grayden Daul	Sophomore	D	6' 0" (1.83 m)	181 lb (82 kg)	2003-01-31	Chicago, Illinois	Langley Rivermen (BCHL)	—
6	(Canada)	Tynan Ewart (C)	Junior	D	6' 0" (1.83 m)	188 lb (85 kg)	2002-02-26	Duncan, British Columbia	St. Cloud State (NCHC)	—
9	(United States)	Zane Demsey (A)	Senior	D	6' 2" (1.88 m)	190 lb (86 kg)	2001-11-04	Harrison Township, Michigan	Miami (NCHC)	—
8	(Canada)	Olivier Beaulieu	Freshman	D	5' 10" (1.78 m)	152 lb (69 kg)	2005-01-07	Terrebonne, Quebec	Chilliwack Chiefs (BCHL)	—
10	(United States)	Mathew Ward	Freshman	F	5' 9" (1.75 m)	168 lb (76 kg)	2004-01-24	Kamloops, British Columbia	Medicine Hat Tigers (WHL)	—
12	(Slovakia)	Peter Císar	Freshman	F	6' 0" (1.83 m)	176 lb (80 kg)	2005-05-30	Bratislava, Slovakia	Youngstown Phantoms (USHL)	—
13	(Canada)	Médrick Bolduc	Sophomore	F	5' 9" (1.75 m)	183 lb (83 kg)	2003-07-09	Val-d'Or, Quebec	El Paso Rhinos (NAHL)	—
14	(Czech Republic)	Jakub Altrichter	Sophomore	F	5' 10" (1.78 m)	154 lb (70 kg)	2003-07-26	Prague, Czech Republic	Waterloo Black Hawks (USHL)	—
15	(Canada)	Grayden Slipec	Sophomore	F	5' 10" (1.78 m)	190 lb (86 kg)	2005-03-06	Surrey, British Columbia	Chicago Steel (USHL)	—
16	(Canada)	Caiden Gault (A)	Senior	F	6' 1" (1.85 m)	190 lb (86 kg)	2002-04-16	Oakbank, Manitoba	Ferris State (CCHA)	—
17	(Latvia)	Ģirts Silkalns	Sophomore	F	6' 2" (1.88 m)	187 lb (85 kg)	2003-06-30	Talsi, Latvia	Massachusetts Lowell (HEA)	—
18	(Canada)	Mikey Burchill	Freshman	F	5' 10" (1.78 m)	163 lb (74 kg)	2005-04-29	Mundelein, Illinois	Des Moines Buccaneers (USHL)	—
19	(Slovakia)	Tobias Pitka	Freshman	F	6' 4" (1.93 m)	225 lb (102 kg)	2006-04-28	Poprad, Slovakia	Victoria Grizzlies (BCHL)	—
20	(Canada)	Anthony Cliche	Sophomore	D	6' 4" (1.93 m)	216 lb (98 kg)	2003-06-09	Vallée-Jonction, Quebec	Vernon Vipers (BCHL)	—
21	(United States)	Tyler Stern	Freshman	F	5' 10" (1.78 m)	174 lb (79 kg)	2004-08-12	Plainview, New York	Maryland Black Bears (NAHL)	—
22	(United States)	Landon MacDonald	Freshman	F	6' 2" (1.88 m)	192 lb (87 kg)	2004-08-12	Brighton, Michigan	Madison Capitols (USHL)	—
23	(United States)	Evan Johnson	Freshman	D	5' 11" (1.8 m)	185 lb (84 kg)	2004-11-22	Trenton, Michigan	North Iowa Bulls (NAHL)	—
24	(Canada)	Kyle Bettens	Senior	F	6' 3" (1.91 m)	215 lb (98 kg)	2001-07-04	Winnipeg, Manitoba	Minnesota Duluth (NCHC)	—
27	(Canada)	Danny Ciccarello	Junior	F	6' 0" (1.83 m)	200 lb (91 kg)	2001-03-23	Kirkland, Quebec	Rensselaer (ECAC)	—
28	(United States)	Matt Argentina	Senior	F	5' 10" (1.78 m)	184 lb (83 kg)	2003-01-16	Philadelphia, Pennsylvania	Chilliwack Chiefs (BCHL)	—
29	(Canada)	Aidyn Hutchinson	Sophomore	F	6' 1" (1.85 m)	172 lb (78 kg)	2003-09-11	St. Albert, Alberta	Melfort Mustangs (SJHL)	—
30	(Canada)	Oliver Auyeung-Ashton	Freshman	G	5' 10" (1.78 m)	163 lb (74 kg)	2005-04-11	Coquitlam, British Columbia	Victoria Grizzlies (BCHL)	—
31	(Canada)	Jack Fuller	Freshman	G	6' 0" (1.83 m)	170 lb (77 kg)	2004-08-21	Centerville, Minnesota	New Mexico Ice Wolves (NAHL)	—
32	(United States)	Max Weilandt	Freshman	G	6' 2" (1.88 m)	196 lb (89 kg)	2005-07-29	Northbrook, Illinois	Des Moines Buccaneers (USHL)	—

== Standings ==
2025–26 Central Collegiate Hockey Association standings
	Conference record										Overall record					
	GP	W	L	T	OTW	OTL	SW	PTS	GF	GA	GP	W	L	T	GF	GA
#16 Minnesota State †	26	14	7	5	1	2	3	51	71	53	37	20	10	7	99	75
#18 St. Thomas	26	15	7	4	2	1	2	50	89	67	36	20	11	5	128	104
#13 Augustana	26	14	8	4	1	2	3	50	72	49	36	22	10	4	108	72
#19 Michigan Tech	26	16	7	3	3	1	0	49	84	59	38	23	12	3	124	99
Bowling Green	26	15	7	4	3	2	1	49	80	59	36	18	11	7	107	88
Bemidji State	26	11	11	4	5	1	3	36	69	68	36	13	19	4	98	103
Lake Superior State	26	8	16	2	1	4	2	31	57	83	36	11	22	3	92	121
Ferris State	26	6	18	2	1	2	1	22	70	100	37	8	27	2	91	138
Northern Michigan	26	3	21	2	0	2	0	13	44	98	34	3	29	2	56	132
Championship: March 20, 2026 † indicates conference regular-season champion (MacNaughton Cup) * indicates conference tournament champion (Mason Cup); Rankings: USCHO.com Top 20 Poll; updated March 8, 2026; Source: CCHA

== Schedule and results ==
Date	Time	Opponent^{#}	Rank^{#}	Site	TV	Decision	Result	Attendance	Record
Exhibition
October 4	7:30 pm	at #15 Massachusetts*		Mullins Center • Amherst, Massachusetts	ESPN+	Gramme	L 3–5	6,093	0–1–0
October 5	4:00 pm	at #15 Massachusetts*		Mullins Center • Amherst, Massachusetts	ESPN+	Gramme	L 1–4	3,104	0–2–0
October 10	6:30 pm	at #16 Ohio State*		Value City Arena • Columbus, Ohio		Gramme	L 2–5	3,520	0–3–0
October 11	5:00 pm	at #16 Ohio State*		Value City Arena • Columbus, Ohio		Auyeung-Ashton	L 1–3	2,976	0–4–0
October 17	7:07 pm	#19 Colorado College*		Berry Events Center • Marquette, Michigan	Midco Sports+	Auyeung-Ashton	L 1–2 ^{OT}	2,617	0–5–0
October 18	6:07 pm	#19 Colorado College*		Berry Events Center • Marquette, Michigan	Midco Sports+	Gramme	L 2–5	2,405	0–6–0
October 24	7:07 pm	#1 Michigan State*		Berry Events Center • Marquette, Michigan	Midco Sports+	Auyeung-Ashton	L 0–4	3,782	0–7–0
October 25	6:07 pm	#1 Michigan State*		Berry Events Center • Marquette, Michigan	Midco Sports+	Auyeung-Ashton	L 2–6	3,698	0–8–0
October 31	8:07 pm	at Augustana		Midco Arena • Sioux Falls, South Dakota	Midco Sports+	Gramme	L 1–2	2,171	0–9–0 (0–1–0)
November 1	7:07 pm	at Augustana		Midco Arena • Sioux Falls, South Dakota	Midco Sports+	Auyeung-Ashton	L 1–3	2,579	0–10–0 (0–2–0)
November 7	7:07 pm	at Michigan Tech		MacInnes Student Ice Arena • Houghton, Michigan (Rivalry)	Midco Sports+	Gramme	L 1–4	3,826	0–11–0 (0–3–0)
November 8	6:07 pm	Michigan Tech		Berry Events Center • Marquette, Michigan (Rivalry)	Midco Sports+	Auyeung-Ashton	L 2–4	4,202	0–12–0 (0–4–0)
November 21	8:07 pm	at Bemidji State		Sanford Center • Bemidji, Minnesota	Midco Sports+	Gramme	L 3–7	2,032	0–13–0 (0–5–0)
November 22	7:07 pm	at Bemidji State		Sanford Center • Bemidji, Minnesota	Midco Sports+	Gramme	L 2–6	2,417	0–14–0 (0–6–0)
November 28	7:07 pm	#14 Minnesota State		Berry Events Center • Marquette, Michigan	Midco Sports+	Gramme	L 0–4	1,670	0–15–0 (0–7–0)
November 29	6:07 pm	#14 Minnesota State		Berry Events Center • Marquette, Michigan	Midco Sports+	Gramme	L 2–3	1,645	0–16–0 (0–8–0)
December 5	7:07 pm	at Bowling Green		Slater Family Ice Arena • Bowling Green, Ohio	Midco Sports+	Gramme	W 3–2	2,589	1–16–0 (1–8–0)
December 6	6:07 pm	at Bowling Green		Slater Family Ice Arena • Bowling Green, Ohio	Midco Sports+	Gramme	L 3–4 ^{OT}	2,103	1–17–0 (1–9–0)
December 12	7:07 pm	St. Thomas		Berry Events Center • Marquette, Michigan	Midco Sports+	Gramme	L 0–2	2,463	1–18–0 (1–10–0)
December 13	6:07 pm	St. Thomas		Berry Events Center • Marquette, Michigan	Midco Sports+	Gramme	L 3–4	1,739	1–19–0 (1–11–0)
January 3	6:07 pm	at Lake Superior State		Taffy Abel Arena • Sault Ste. Marie, Michigan	Midco Sports+	Auyeung-Ashton	L 1–2 ^{OT}	—	1–20–0 (1–12–0)
January 4	4:07 pm	at Lake Superior State		Taffy Abel Arena • Sault Ste. Marie, Michigan	Midco Sports+	Auyeung-Ashton	L 1–2	—	1–21–0 (1–13–0)
January 9	7:07 pm	#17 Augustana		Berry Events Center • Marquette, Michigan	Midco Sports+	Auyeung-Ashton	L 0–3	2,343	1–22–0 (1–14–0)
January 10	6:07 pm	#17 Augustana		Berry Events Center • Marquette, Michigan	Midco Sports+	Auyeung-Ashton	L 0–2	—	1–23–0 (1–15–0)
January 23	7:07 pm	#19 Michigan Tech		Berry Events Center • Marquette, Michigan (Rivalry)	Midco Sports+, Fox UP	Auyeung-Ashton	L 2–8	4,163	1–24–0 (1–16–0)
January 24	6:07 pm	at #19 Michigan Tech		MacInnes Student Ice Arena • Houghton, Michigan (Rivalry)	Midco Sports+, Fox UP	Auyeung-Ashton	W 3–2	4,071	2–24–0 (2–16–0)
January 30	7:07 pm	Bemidji State		Berry Events Center • Marquette, Michigan	Midco Sports+	Auyeung-Ashton	W 2–0	2,331	3–24–0 (3–16–0)
January 31	6:07 pm	Bemidji State		Berry Events Center • Marquette, Michigan	Midco Sports+	Auyeung-Ashton	L 1–7	2,460	3–25–0 (3–17–0)
February 13	7:07 pm	at Ferris State		Ewigleben Arena • Big Rapids, Michigan	Midco Sports+	Gramme	T 4–4 ^{SOL}	1,867	3–25–1 (3–17–1)
February 14	6:07 pm	at Ferris State		Ewigleben Arena • Big Rapids, Michigan	Midco Sports+	Gramme	L 0–6	2,026	3–26–1 (3–18–1)
February 20	7:07 pm	Lake Superior State		Berry Events Center • Marquette, Michigan	Midco Sports+	Gramme	L 5–7	2,544	3–27–1 (3–19–1)
February 21	6:07 pm	Lake Superior State		Berry Events Center • Marquette, Michigan	Midco Sports+	Weilandt	L 2–5	2,520	3–28–1 (3–20–1)
February 27	8:07 pm	at #18 Minnesota State		Mayo Clinic Health System Event Center • Mankato, Minnesota	Midco Sports+	Auyeung-Ashton	T 2–2 ^{SOL}	4,196	3–28–2 (3–20–2)
February 28	7:07 pm	at #18 Minnesota State		Mayo Clinic Health System Event Center • Mankato, Minnesota	Midco Sports+	Auyeung-Ashton	L 0–3	4,892	3–29–2 (3–21–2)
*Non-conference game. ^{#}Rankings from USCHO.com Poll. All times are in Eastern Time. Source:

== Scoring statistics ==
Name	Position	Games	Goals	Assists	Points	PIM
Caiden Gault	F	33	16	2	18	29
Tobias Pitka	C	25	5	7	12	14
Jakub Altrichter	C	27	4	7	11	34
Kyle Bettens	C/RW	31	2	9	11	20
Matt Argentina	C/RW	34	4	6	10	16
Joe Schiller	D	28	3	7	10	4
Tynan Ewart	D	34	1	9	10	25
Peter Císar	F	20	4	5	9	27
Michael Burchill	F	31	5	3	8	4
Mathew Ward	F	27	2	6	8	20
Ģirts Silkalns	F	25	2	5	7	12
Grayden Slipec	F	21	1	6	7	10
Warren Clark	D	33	2	4	6	6
Médrick Bolduc	F	32	2	3	5	20
Olivier Beaulieu	D	14	0	4	4	2
Landon MacDonald	F	21	2	0	2	10
Danny Ciccarello	F	28	1	1	2	22
Aidyn Hutchinson	F	29	0	2	2	13
Tyler Stern	F	20	0	1	1	4
Nicolas Ardanaz	D	31	0	1	1	10
Zane Demsey	D	31	0	1	1	14
Anthony Cliche	D	33	0	1	1	18
Max Weilandt	G	5	0	0	0	0
Grayden Daul	D	8	0	0	0	0
Evan Johnson	D	17	0	0	0	0
Oliver Auyeung-Ashton	G	18	0	0	0	0
William Gramme	G	18	0	0	0	0
Total			56	90	146	352

== Goaltending statistics ==
Name	Games	Minutes	Wins	Losses	Ties	Goals Against	Saves	Shut Outs	SV %	GAA
Oliver Auyeung-Ashton	18	944:32	2	13	1	42	555	1	.930	2.67
Max Weilandt	5	105:02	0	1	0	6	40	0	.870	3.43
William Gramme	18	974:01	1	15	1	69	579	0	.894	4.25
Empty Net	-	36:15	-	-	-	15	-	-	-	-
Total	34	2059:50	3	29	2	132	1174	1	.899	3.84

== Rankings ==
Poll	Week																											
Poll	Pre	1	2	3	4	5	6	7	8	9	10	11	12	13	14	15	16	17	18	19	20	21	22	23	24	25	26	27 (Final)
USCHO.com	NR	NR	NR	NR	NR	NR	NR	NR	NR	NR	NR	NR	–	NR	NR	NR	NR	NR	NR	NR	NR	NR	NR	NR	NR	NR	NR	NR
USA Hockey	NR	NR	NR	NR	NR	NR	NR	NR	NR	NR	NR	NR	–	NR	NR	NR	NR	NR	NR	NR	NR	NR	NR	NR	NR	NR	NR	NR

Note: USCHO did not release a poll in week 12.
Note: USA Hockey did not release a poll in week 12.
