= Alex Tracy =

American ice hockey goaltender (born 2001)

- Born: May 4, 2001 (age 25) Chicago, Illinois, U.S.
- Height: 6 ft 0 in (183 cm)
- Weight: 187 lb (85 kg; 13 st 5 lb)
- Position: Goaltender
- Catches: Left
- AHL team: Henderson Silver Knights
- NHL draft: Undrafted
- Playing career: 2026–present

Alexander Tracy (born May 4, 2001) is an American professional ice hockey goaltender for the Henderson Silver Knights of the American Hockey League (AHL).

== Playing career ==
=== Junior ===
On May 5, 2020, Tracy was drafted in the third round of the United States Hockey League (USHL).draft by the Sioux City Musketeers. He spent two seasons with the Musketeers of the USHL. During the 2020–21 season, where he appeared in 18 games, and posted a 9–7–0 record, with a 2.66 goals against average (GAA) and a .889 save percentage. During the 2021–22 season, he appeared in 44 games and posted a 27–10–3 record, with a 2.50 GAA and a .896 save percentage. During the Clark Cup playoffs, he posted an 8–2 record, with a 1.61 GAA, a .937 save percentage and three shutouts, as he helped lead the Musketeers to the Clark Cup championship for the first time since 2002. He was subsequently named the Clark Cup MVP. Following the season he was named the Dave Peterson Goalie of the Year Award winner.

=== College ===
He began his college ice hockey career during the 2022–23 season, where he appeared in ten games, prior to the holiday break, and split his time in net with Keenan Rancier. During his rookie year he posted a 6–3–0 record, with a 2.24 GAA and an .879 save percentage. During the 2023–24 season, in his sophomore year, he appeared in 30 games, with 28 starts, and posted a 13–10–4 record, with a 2.50 GAA and a .910 save percentage.

During the 2024–25 season, in his junior year, he appeared in 38 games, and posted a 26–9–3 record, with a 1.42 GAA and a .946 save percentage. During November 2024, he posted a 5–1–2 record, with a 1.23 GAA and .955 save percentage, and one shutout. He led the nation in GAA and save percentage during the month and was subsequently named the Hockey Commissioners' Association's Co-National Goaltender of the Month. During conference pay, he appeared in 25 games and posted a 17–5–3 record, with a 1.43 GAA and a .947 save percentage. He led the league in GAA and save percentage. Following an outstanding season, he was named the CCHA Goaltender of the Year and CCHA Player of the Year. He was also named a finalist for the Mike Richter Award, and a top-ten finalist for the Hobey Baker Award.

During the During the 2025–26 season, in his senior year, he appeared in 38 games, and posted a 21–10–7 record, with a 1.79 GAA and a .927 save percentage. During the championship game of the 2026 CCHA tournament against St. Thomas he stopped 29 of 30 shots to help Minnesota State win the CCHA tournament and was subsequently named CCHA tournament MVP.

At the completion of his collegiate career, Tracy embarked on his professional career in signing a one-year AHL contract with the Henderson Silver Knights, affiliate to the Vegas Golden Knights on March 31, 2026.

== Career statistics ==
			Regular season									Playoffs
Season	Team	League	GP	W	L	OTL	MIN	GA	SO	GAA	SV%	GP	W	L	MIN	GA	SO	GAA	SV%
2020–21	Sioux City Musketeers	USHL	18	9	7	0	969	43	1	2.66	.889	—	—	—	—	—	—	—	—
2021–22	Sioux City Musketeers	USHL	44	27	10	3	2,427	101	3	2.50	.896	—	—	—	—	—	—	—	—
2022–23	Minnesota State University	CCHA	10	6	3	0	562	21	1	2.24	.879	—	—	—	—	—	—	—	—
2023–24	Minnesota State University	CCHA	28	13	10	4	1,584	66	2	2.50	.910	—	—	—	—	—	—	—	—
2024–25	Minnesota State University	CCHA	38	26	9	3	2,317	55	5	1.42	.946	—	—	—	—	—	—	—	—
2025–26	Minnesota State University	CCHA	39	21	11	7	2,365	71	0	1.80	.927	—	—	—	—	—	—	—	—
2025–26	Tahoe Knight Monsters	ECHL	4	3	1	0	242	10	1	2.49	.935	2	0	2	80	7	0	5.25	.851
NCAA totals			115	66	33	14	6,831	184	8	1.87	.927	—	—	—	—	—	—	—	—

== Awards and honors ==
Award	Year
College
First Team All-CCHA	2025
CCHA Player of the Year	2025
CCHA Goaltender of the Year	2025
AHCA West Second Team All-American	2025
Second Team All-CCHA	2026
CCHA Tournament MVP	2026

Awards and achievements
Preceded by Sam Morton	CCHA Player of the Year; 2024–25	Succeeded by Josh Kotai
Preceded by Mattias Sholl	CCHA Goaltender of the Year; 2024–25	Succeeded by Josh Kotai
