= Josh Kotai =

Canadian ice hockey player (born 2003)

- Born: March 13, 2003 (age 23) Abbotsford, British Columbia, Canada
- Height: 6 ft 2 in (188 cm)
- Weight: 175 lb (79 kg; 12 st 7 lb)
- Position: Goaltender
- Catches: Right
- NHL team (P) Cur. team: New York Islanders; Hamilton Hammers (AHL)
- NHL draft: Undrafted
- Playing career: 2026–present

Joshua Kotai (born March 13, 2003) is a Canadian professional ice hockey goaltender for the Hamilton Hammers of the American Hockey League (AHL) while under contract to the New York Islanders of the National Hockey League (NHL). He played college ice hockey at Augustana University.

== Playing career ==
=== Junior ===
Kotai played the 2022–23 season with the Battlefords North Stars in the Saskatchewan Junior Hockey League (SJHL), where he posted a 32–4–3 record with a 2.39 goals against average (GAA) and .935 save percentage. During the postseason, he posted a 12–1–0 record with a 1.72 GAA and a .945 save percentage to help Battlefords win the championship.

=== College ===
He began his college ice hockey career during the 2023–24 season. During his rookie year he appeared in 13 games and posted a 2–9–2 record, with a 3.32 GAA and an .904 save percentage. During the 2024–25 season, in his sophomore year, he appeared in 31 games, and posted a 17–10–3 record, with a 1.92 GAA and a .936 save percentage. During October 2024, he posted a 3–2–0 record, with a 1.63 GAA, .950 save percentage and two shutouts. He posted the highest save percentage in the nation among netminders with four or more starts and his two shutouts ranked first in the nation during the month and was subsequently named the Hockey Commissioners' Association's Co-National Goaltender of the Month. He was also named the CCHA Goaltender of the Month, becoming the first recipient in program history to earn a monthly award from the league. In January 2025, he posted a 5–0–2 record, with a 1.39 GAA and .958 save percentage, and was named Hockey Commissioners' Association's Co-National Goaltender of the Month for the second time in his career.

During the 2025–26 season, in his junior year, he appeared in 35 games, and posted a 20–11–4 record, with a 1.99 GAA and a .938 save percentage. He ranked second nationally in saves made (1,056) and save percentage, fifth in minutes played (2,111) and seventh in both GAA and wins. During conference pay, he appeared in 26 games and posted a 14–8–4 record, with a 1.87 GAA and a league-best .941 save percentage. He tied for the conference lead with four shutouts, and made a league-high 786 saves across 1576:04 minutes. He ranked third among all CCHA goaltenders in single-season save percentage, and fourth in GAA since the league was reconsituted in 2021–22. Following an outstanding season, he was named the CCHA Goaltender of the Year and CCHA Player of the Year. He was also named a First-Team All-CCHA selection, and a top-three finalist for the Mike Richter Award.

He finished his collegiate career with a 39–30–9 record, a 2.17 GAA, .931 save percentage and eight shutouts in 79 games.

=== Professional ===
On March 24, 2026, Kotai signed a two-year, entry-level contract with the New York Islanders.

== Career statistics ==
			Regular season										Playoffs
Season	Team	League	GP	W	L	T	OTL	MIN	GA	SO	GAA	SV%	GP	W	L	MIN	GA	SO	GAA	SV%
2022–23	Battlefords North Stars	SJHL	39	32	4	0	3	2,313	92	3	2.39	.935	13	12	1	802	23	3	1.72	.945
2023–24	Augustana University	CCHA	13	2	9	0	2	723	40	0	3.32	.904	—	—	—	—	—	—	—	—
2024–25	Augustana University	CCHA	31	17	10	0	3	1,809	58	3	1.92	.936	—	—	—	—	—	—	—	—
2025–26	Augustana University	CCHA	35	20	11	0	4	2,112	70	5	1.99	.938	—	—	—	—	—	—	—	—
2025–26	Bridgeport Islanders	AHL	1	0	1	0	0	58	1	0	1.39	.909	—	—	—	—	—	—	—	—
NCAA totals			79	39	30		9	4,644	168	8	2.17	.931	—	—	—	—	—	—	—	—

== Awards and honours ==
Award	Year
College
Second Team All-CCHA	2025
First Team All-CCHA	2026
CCHA Player of the Year	2026
CCHA Goaltender of the Year	2026
AHCA West Second Team All-American	2026

Awards and achievements
Preceded by Alex Tracy	CCHA Player of the Year; 2025–26	Succeeded by Incumbent
Preceded by Alex Tracy	CCHA Goaltender of the Year; 2025–26	Succeeded by Incumbent
