= Lee & Penny Anderson Arena =

University of St. Thomas sports arena

- Anderson Arena, The Penny

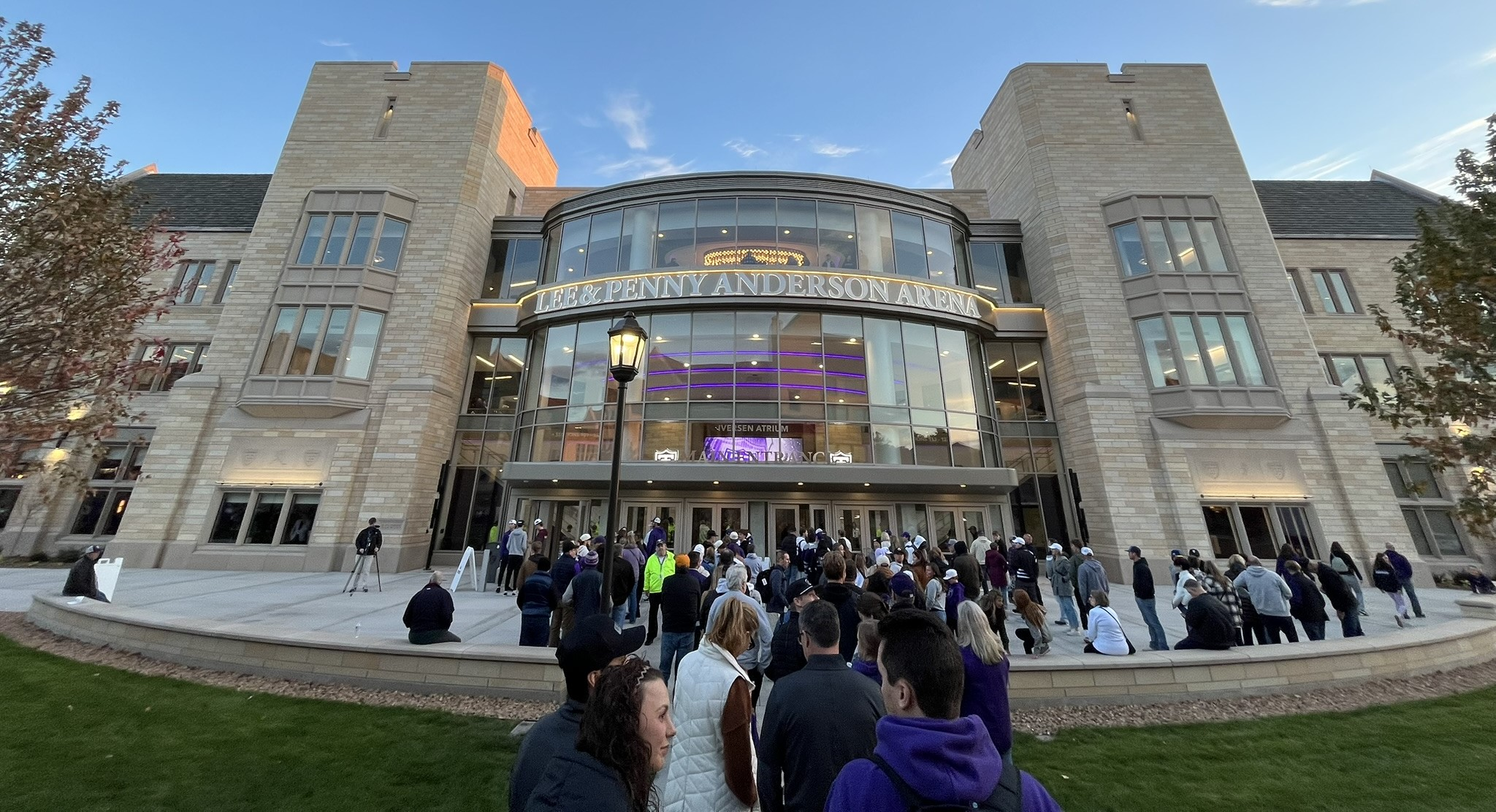
- Main entrance
- Interactive map of Lee & Penny Anderson Arena
- Address: 2115 Summit Ave
- Location: Saint Paul, Minnesota
- Coordinates: 44.9395°N 93.1945°W
- Owner: University of St. Thomas
- Capacity: 4,000 (ice hockey); 5,300 (basketball); 6,000 (concerts, university commencements)

Construction
- Groundbreaking: 2024
- Opened: October 24, 2025
- Cost: $183 million
- Architects: Ryan A+E; Crawford Architects
- Structural engineer: Meyer Borgman Johnson
- Services engineer: IMEG
- General contractor: Ryan Companies US, Inc.

Tenants
- St. Thomas Tommies (NCAA); Men's basketball (2025–present); Women's basketball (2025–present); Men's hockey (2025–present); Women's hockey (2025–present); Minnesota Monsters (AF1) (2027–present)

Website
- tommiesports.com/feature/lee-and-penny-anderson-arena

Lee & Penny Anderson Arena is an indoor arena on the campus of the University of St. Thomas in Saint Paul, Minnesota. Completed in 2025, the facility is the home arena of the St. Thomas basketball and hockey teams.

== History ==
In 2020, St. Thomas received approval to move its athletics programs directly from NCAA Division III to NCAA Division I as a result of being removed from the Minnesota Intercollegiate Athletic Conference. At the time, it was noted that athletics facilities would need to be assessed, due to Division I's elevated requirements. Continued use of existing facilities, leasing other facilities, or building new facilities were all listed as options. Since 2003, St. Thomas' men's and women's hockey teams have played at St. Thomas Ice Arena in Mendota Heights. With a capacity of just 1,000, it is the third-smallest arena in Division I men's hockey.

In February 2022, St. Thomas offered $61.4 million to purchase nearby Town & Country Club, with the intent to build athletic facilities on the site. The country club's board of directors voted to reject the offer.

In June 2022, it was reported that the university planned to build sports facilities, including a new hockey arena, at the former Ford Motor Company Twin Cities Assembly Plant redevelopment site known as Highland Bridge. In July 2022, St. Thomas announced it no longer planned to build a hockey arena at the Highland Bridge site and would focus on on-campus locations.

On January 17, 2023, St. Thomas announced that it had received a $75 million gift from Lee and Penny Anderson to construct a multiuse on-campus arena in St. Paul. With a total project cost estimated to be $175 million, the arena would be home to St. Thomas' basketball and hockey teams. The arena would also host commencement, speakers, career fairs, and other events for the broader community, such as concerts. Three buildings will need to be demolished to make room for the arena, including Cretin Hall, a dormitory designed by Cass Gilbert and built in 1894.

In addition to the removal of three buildings, several surface lots were removed, resulting in the net loss of over 250 parking spaces. Because of this, the university has sought increased public transportation options, will schedule high-attendance events on weekends, and enact parking restrictions during events.

In November 2023, residents living in the nearby neighborhood filed a petition to the Minnesota Court of Appeals to block construction of the project, releasing a statement which called the project's submitted environmental assessment misleading. The group's main concerns were lack of parking accommodations for the many expected events throughout the year. Combined with construction of the adjacent Schoenecker Center (which opened in the Spring of 2024) on the university's south campus, construction of the arena is set to result in a net loss of approximately 390 parking stalls.

The arena officially opened on October 24, 2025 with the St. Thomas men's and women's hockey teams hosting Providence. The first basketball events at the arena were on November 8, 2025, as the Tommie men's and women's teams took on Army. Starting February 20, 2026, beer and seltzer became available for sale throughout the stadium. They had previously only been available in premium areas.

== Design ==
The arena's design is in a Gothic architectural style featuring Kasota limestone, similar to many other buildings on campus.

It is designed such that quick conversions can be made between hockey, basketball and other events. The complex houses basketball and hockey practice facilities, including a second ice sheet with seating for 700.

The building is LEED Silver certified, a sustainability benchmark for green building certification. The arena is pursuing utilizing both geothermal energy and groundwater to be the first sustainable ice rink in the US and one of the most efficient ice rinks in the world.

== Criticism ==
Advocates believed the environmental analysis for the arena was inadequate due to failing to fully assess greenhouse gases generated by the arena and increased traffic. Construction on the arena was halted after the Advocates for Responsible Development appealed the arena’s site plans to the St. Paul City Planning Commission, but the City ruled in favor of St. Thomas, and construction resumed. The Minnesota Court of Appeals heard oral arguments on the lawsuit on April 11, 2024. The Court ruled that the first Environmental Assessment Worksheet was invalid, and that St. Thomas must complete a new one, a decision that St. Thomas has since appealed and is awaiting further debate. St. Thomas resubmitted an EAW and has been cleared to open the arena.

== Gallery ==
Lee & Penny Anderson Arena
Proposal rendering

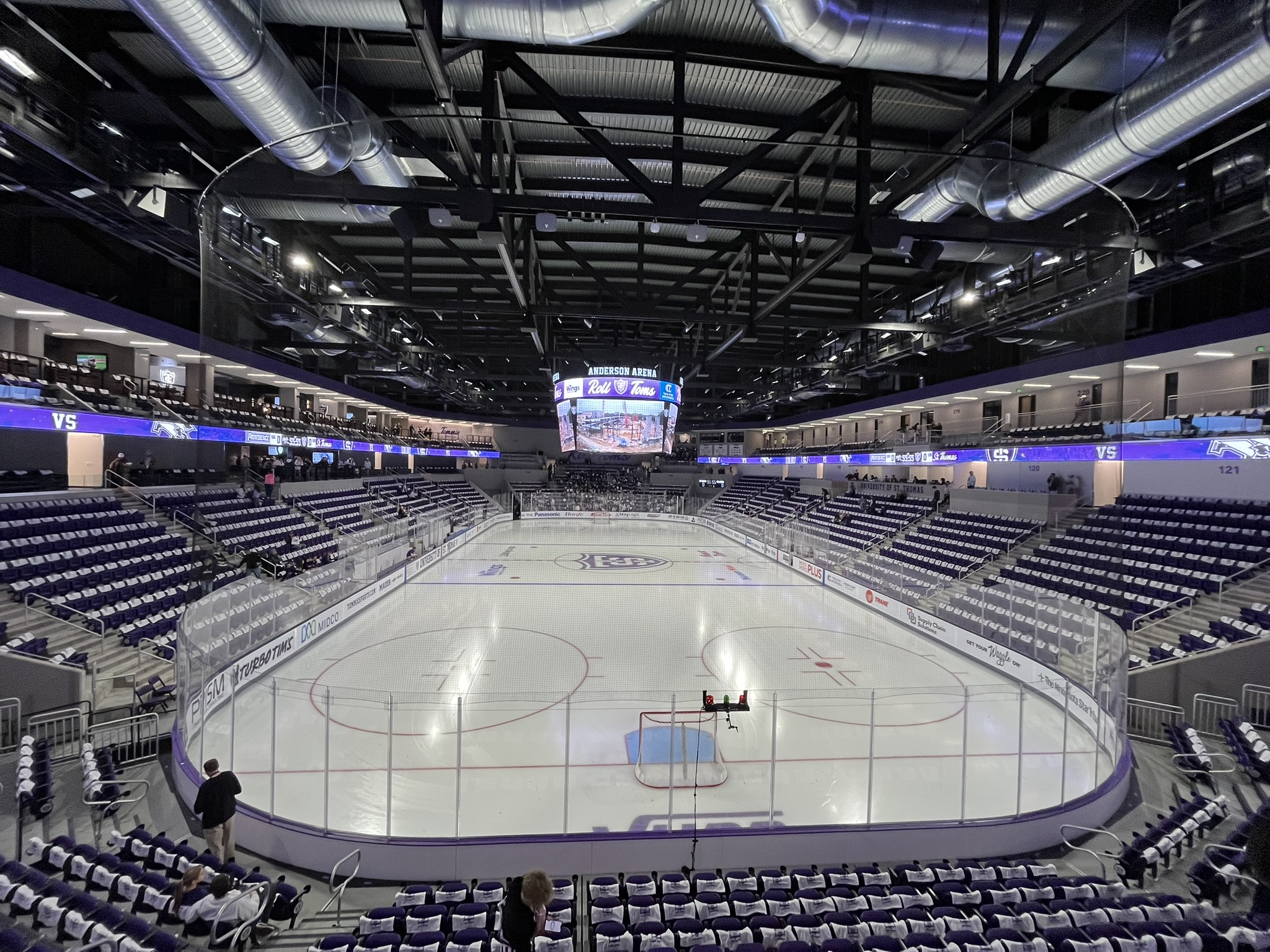
Interior of arena in hockey configuration
