= Midco Arena =

Ice hockey arena in South Dakota, United States

- “The Palace on Grange”
- Interactive map of Midco Arena
- Location: 2510 S Grange Ave Sioux Falls, SD, 57197
- Coordinates: 43°31′19″N 96°44′27″W
- Owner: Augustana University
- Operator: Augustana University
- Capacity: 3,082
- Surface: 200' x 85' (hockey)

Construction
- Groundbreaking: October 5, 2021
- Opened: January 26, 2024 (First Game)
- Cost: $40 million (estimate)
- Architect: JLG Architects

Tenant
- Augustana University Vikings men's ice hockey (2024–)

Midco Arena in Sioux Falls, South Dakota is a 3,082-seat ice hockey arena on the campus of Augustana University. The arena broke ground on October 5, 2021 and opened as the permanent home of the Augustana Vikings men's ice hockey team on January 26, 2024. The arena is also home to the university's women's soccer team.

== History ==
Plans for Augustana University to begin playing varsity ice hockey began as far back as 2018 when the school's athletic department discussed moving its programs to the NCAA Division I level. The school formally announced that it was strongly considering adding a men's ice hockey program in the summer of 2021 but, as the school did not have a sufficient rink at their disposal, the goal was only tentative. Less than 4 months later, the school announced they were officially adding the program for the 2023–24 season when they broke ground for the Midco Arena.

The arena opened in January 2024. The Vikings played the first five home games of their inaugural 2023–24 season off campus at Denny Sanford Premier Center. Midco Arena hosted its first Vikings game on January 26, 2024, a 2–5 loss to Ferris State.

== Namesake ==
Midco is a regional cable provider for North and South Dakota. The company was one of several organizations and persons to donate money to Augustana University for the purpose of founding its ice hockey program.
