= Bowling Green Falcons men's ice hockey statistical leaders =

The Bowling Green Falcons men's ice hockey statistical leaders are individual statistical leaders of the Bowling Green Falcons men's ice hockey program in various categories, including goals, assists, points, and saves. Within those areas, the lists identify single-game, single-season, and career leaders. The Falcons represent Bowling Green State University in the NCAA's Central Collegiate Hockey Association.

Bowling Green began competing in intercollegiate ice hockey in 1969. These lists are updated through the end of the 2020–21 season.

== Goals ==
Career
Rk	Player	Goals	Seasons
1	Jamie Wansbrough	127	1982–83 1983–84 1984–85 1985–86
2	Mike Bartley	118	1970–71 1971–72 1972–73 1973–74
3	Brian Hills	116	1979–80 1980–81 1981–82 1982–83
4	Mike Hartman	114	1974–75 1975–76 1976–77 1977–78
	George McPhee	114	1978–79 1979–80 1980–81 1981–82
6	Nelson Emerson	112	1986–87 1987–88 1988–89 1989–90
7	Brian Holzinger	102	1991–92 1992–93 1993–94 1994–95
	John Markell	102	1975–76 1976–77 1977–78 1978–79
9	Greg Parks	101	1985–86 1986–87 1987–88 1988–89
10	Bob Dobek	94	1972–73 1973–74 1974–75

Season
Rk	Player	Goals	Season
1	Bob Dobek	44	1973–74
2	George McPhee	40	1978–79
3	Mike Bartley	37	1971–72
	Brian Hills	37	1982–83
	Jamie Wansbrough	37	1984–85
6	Brian Holzinger	35	1994–95
	Mike Hartman	35	1977–78
8	Mike Bartley	34	1972–73
	Doug Ross	34	1974–75
	Mike Hartman	34	1974–75
	Jamie Wansbrough	34	1983–84
	Brian Hills	34	1981–82
	Brian MacLellan	34	1978–79
	Nelson Emerson	34	1987–88

Single Game
Rk	Player	Goals	Season	Opponent
1	Mike Hartman	5	1975–76	SUNY-Buffalo
	Jack Laine	5	1976–77	Ohio State
	Jamie Wansbrough	5	1982–83	Notre Dame

== Assists ==
Career
Rk	Player	Assists	Seasons
1	Nelson Emerson	182	1986–87 1987–88 1988–89 1989–90
2	Mark Wells	154	1975–76 1976–77 1977–78 1978–79
	Brian Hills	154	1979–80 1980–81 1981–82 1982–83
4	George McPhee	153	1978–79 1979–80 1980–81 1981–82
5	Brett Harkins	148	1989–90 1990–91 1991–92 1992–93
6	Greg Parks	139	1985–86 1986–87 1987–88 1988–89
7	Paul Ysebaert	135	1984–85 1985–86 1986–87
8	Bob Dobek	134	1972–73 1973–74 1974–75
9	John Markell	133	1975–76 1976–77 1977–78 1978–79
10	Curtis Fry	126	1993–94 1994–95 1995–96 1996–97

Season
Rk	Player	Assists	Season
1	Bob Dobek	58	1974–75
	Paul Ysebaert	58	1986–87
3	Brian Hills	57	1982–83
	Mark Wells	57	1978–79
5	George McPhee	52	1981–82
	Garry Galley	52	1983–84
	Nelson Emerson	52	1989–90
8	John Markell	49	1978–79
	Nelson Emerson	49	1987–88
10	George McPhee	48	1978–79
	Dan Kane	48	1983–84

Single Game
Rk	Player	Assists	Season	Opponent
1	Brian Hills	7	1981–82	Ferris State

== Points ==
Career
Rk	Player	Points	Seasons
1	Nelson Emerson	294	1986–87 1987–88 1988–89 1989–90
2	Brian Hills	270	1979–80 1980–81 1981–82 1982–83
3	George McPhee	267	1978–79 1979–80 1980–81 1981–82
4	Greg Parks	240	1985–86 1986–87 1987–88 1988–89
5	Jamie Wansbrough	237	1982–83 1983–84 1984–85 1985–86
6	John Markell	235	1975–76 1976–77 1977–78 1978–79
7	Mark Wells	231	1975–76 1976–77 1977–78 1978–79
8	Bob Dobek	228	1972–73 1973–74 1974–75
9	Mike Bartley	222	1970–71 1971–72 1972–73 1973–74
10	Paul Ysebaert	208	1984–85 1985–86 1986–87
	Brett Harkins	208	1989–90 1990–91 1991–92 1992–93

Season
Rk	Player	Points	Season
1	Brian Hills	94	1982–83
2	George McPhee	88	1978–79
3	Bob Dobek	86	1973–74
4	Paul Ysebaert	85	1986–87
5	Nelson Emerson	83	1987–88
	Mark Wells	83	1978–79
7	Nelson Emerson	82	1989–90
8	Brian Hills	81	1981–82
9	John Markell	80	1978–79
	George McPhee	80	1981–82

Single Game
Rk	Player	Points	Season	Opponent
1	Mike Hall	8	1995–96	Alaska Fairbanks

== Saves ==
Career
Rk	Player	Saves	Seasons
1	Gary Kruzich	3,580	1983–84 1984–85 1985–86 1986–87
2	Tyler Masters	3,286	1999–00 2000–01 2001–02 2002–03
3	Jordan Sigalet	3,147	2001–02 2002–03 2003–04 2004–05
4	Andrew Hammond	3,030	2009–10 2010–11 2011–12 2012–13
5	Wally Charko	2,919	1977–78 1978–79 1979–80 1980–81
6	Paul Connell	2,442	1986–87 1987–88 1988–89 1989–90
7	Jimmy Spratt	2,441	2005–06 2006–07 2007–08 2008–09
8	Christian Stoever	2,412	2021–22 2022–23 2023–24 2024–25
9	Mike Liut	2,204	1973–74 1974–75 1975–76 1976–77
10	Mike David	2,163	1979–80 1980–81 1981–82 1982–83

Season
Rk	Player	Saves	Season
1	Jordan Sigalet	1,140	2003–04
2	Andrew Hammond	1,114	2011–12
3	Tyler Masters	1,087	2000–01
4	Gary Kruzich	1,043	1985–86
5	Paul Connell	1,032	1988–89
6	Mike David	989	1981–82
7	Wally Charko	983	1978–79
8	Wally Charko	966	1980–81
9	Jordan Sigalet	963	2004–05
10	Tyler Masters	959	2001–02

Single Game
Rk	Player	Saves	Season	Opponent
1	Jordan Sigalet	56	2003–04	Notre Dame
