= List of Bowling Green Falcons men's ice hockey seasons =

This is a list of seasons completed by the Bowling Green State University Falcons men's ice hockey team. The list documents the season-by-season records of the Falcons from 1969 to present, including conference and national post season records.

Bowling Green has won one NCAA Men's Division I Ice Hockey Championships (1984). In their history the Falcons have made appearances in nine NCAA tournaments (1977, 1978, 1979, 1982, 1984, 1987, 1988, 1989, 1990), including two Frozen Four appearances in 1978 and 1984. The Falcons have been named the MCHA and the CCHA's regular season champion a combined nine times and won five conference tournament.

== Record ==
NCAA D-I Champions	NCAA Frozen Four	Conference regular season champions	Conference Playoff Champions

Season	Conference	Regular season (Note: Code explanation; GP—Games Played, W—Wins, L—Losses, T—Tied games, OTW—Overtime Wins, OTL—Overtime Loses, 3/SW—Win in 3 on 3 overtime or shootout, Pts—Points*)														Conference Tournament Results	National Tournament Results
Season	Conference	Conference									Overall					Conference Tournament Results	National Tournament Results
Season	Conference	GP	W	L	T	OTW	OTL	3/SW	Pts*	Finish	GP	W	L	T	%	Conference Tournament Results	National Tournament Results
Jack Vivian (1969 — 1973)
1969–70	MCHA									1st	30	13	12	5	.517		
1970–71	MCHA									1st	31	18	12	1	.597		
University Division
1971–72	CCHA	12	6	4	2	-	-	-	14	3rd	33	21	10	2	.667	Lost Semifinal, 5–6 (OT) (St. Louis); Won Third Place, 7–6 (OT) (Ohio)	
1972–73	CCHA	16	6	10	0	-	-	-	12	4th	35	16	19	0	.457	Won Round Robin, 6–5 (OT) (St. Louis); Won Round Robin, 8–1 (Ohio State)	
Division I
Ron Mason (1973 — 1979)
1973–74	CCHA	8	2	6	0	-	-	-	4	3rd	39	20	19	0	.513	Lost Semifinal, 1–6 (St. Louis); Won Third Place, 11–4 (Western Michigan)	
1974–75	CCHA	8	4	3	1	-	-	-	9	2nd	35	23	10	2	.686	Lost Semifinal, 4–6 (Lake Superior State)	
1975–76	CCHA	16	11	4	1	-	-	-	23	1st	32	21	9	2	.688	Lost Semifinal, 2–3 (OT) (Western Michigan)	
1976–77	CCHA	16	10	6	0	-	-	-	20	2nd	39	28	11	0	.718	Won Semifinal series, 9–3 (Ohio State); Won Championship series, 5–4 (St. Louis)	Lost NCAA Quarterfinal, 5–7 (Michigan)
1977–78	CCHA	18	15	3	0	-	-	-	30	1st	39	31	8	0	.795	Won Semifinal series, 7–3 (Ohio State); Won Championship series, 13–3 (St. Louis)	Won NCAA Quarterfinal, 5–3 (Colorado College); Lost NCAA Semifinal, 2–6 (Boston College); Won NCAA Third Place, 4–3 (Wisconsin)
1978–79	CCHA	24	21	2	1	-	-	-	43	1st	45	37	6	2	.844	Won Semifinal series, 18–2 (Lake Superior State); Won Championship series, 11–7 (Ohio State)	Lost NCAA Quarterfinal, 3–6 (Minnesota)
Jerry York (1979 — 1994)
1979–80	CCHA	20	9	11	0	-	-	-	18	4th	38	16	20	2	.447	Lost Semifinal series, 6–14 (Northern Michigan)	
1980–81	CCHA	22	10	12	0	-	-	-	20	4th	39	13	24	2	.359	Lost Semifinal series, 5–13 (Northern Michigan)	
1981–82	CCHA	28	20	7	1	-	-	-	41	1st	42	27	13	2	.667	Won Quarterfinal series, 18–5 (Northern Michigan); Lost Semifinal, 5–8 (Notre Dame); Won Third Place, 2–1 (Michigan Tech)	Lost NCAA Quarterfinal series, 4–5 (OT) (Northeastern)
1982–83	CCHA	32	24	5	3	-	-	-	51	1st	40	28	8	4	.750	Won Quarterfinal series, 15–5 (Notre Dame); Won Semifinal, 3–0 (Northern Michigan); Lost Championship, 3–4 (OT) (Michigan State)	
1983–84	CCHA	28	22	4	2	-	-	-	.821	1st	44	34	8	2	.795	Won Quarterfinal series, 13–10 (Lake Superior State); Lost Semifinal, 3–4 (2OT) (Western Michigan); Lost Third Place, 2–3 (OT) (Ohio State)	Won NCAA Quarterfinal series, 8–7 (OT) (Boston University); Won NCAA Semifinal, 2–1 (Michigan State); Won NCAA Championship, 5–4 (4OT) (Minnesota-Duluth)
1984–85	CCHA	32	17	15	0	-	-	-	34	4th	42	21	21	0	.500	Won Quarterfinal series, 14–7 (Illinois-Chicago); Lost Semifinal, 1–4 (Lake Superior State); Lost Third Place, 4–7 (Ohio State)	
1985–86	CCHA	32	23	9	0	-	-	-	46	T-2nd	42	28	14	0	.667	Won Quarterfinal series, 2–0 (Illinois-Chicago); Lost Semifinal, 3–4 (3OT) (Western Michigan); Won Third Place, 3–0 (Lake Superior State)	
1986–87	CCHA	32	24	6	2	-	-	-	50	1st	45	33	10	2	.756	Won Quarterfinal series, 2–1 (Ferris State); Won Semifinal, 5–3 (Ohio State); Lost Championship, 3–4 (OT) (Michigan State)	Lost NCAA Quarterfinal series, 1–10 (Harvard)
1987–88	CCHA	32	19	11	2	-	-	-	39	2nd	45	30	13	2	.689	Won Quarterfinal series, 2–0 (Ferris State); Won Semifinal, 6–4 (Michigan State); Won Championship, 5–3 (Lake Superior State)	Won NCAA first round series, 10–2 (Vermont); Lost NCAA Quarterfinal series, 4–9 (Maine)
1988–89	CCHA	32	15	14	3	-	-	-	33	5th	47	26	18	3	.585	Won Quarterfinal series, 2–1 (Michigan); Lost Semifinal, 2–3 (Michigan State); Won Third Place, 5–3 (Illinois-Chicago)	Lost NCAA first round series, 0–2 (Boston College)
1989–90	CCHA	32	20	10	2	-	-	-	42	3rd	44	25	17	2	.591	Won Quarterfinal series, 2–0 (Ohio State); Lost Semifinal, 2–4 (Lake Superior State); Lost Third Place, 4–5 (Michigan)	Lost NCAA first round series, 0–2 (Maine)
1990–91	CCHA	32	13	17	2	-	-	-	28	6th	38	15	21	2	.591	Lost Quarterfinal series, 0–2 (Ferris State)	
1991–92	CCHA	32	7	20	5	-	-	-	19	9th	34	8	21	5	.309		
1992–93	CCHA	30	12	17	1	-	-	-	25	7th	41	19	21	1	.476	Won First Round series, 2–0 (Western Michigan); Lost Quarterfinal, 1–7 (Lake Superior State)	
1993–94	CCHA	30	15	13	2	-	-	-	32	6th	38	19	17	2	.526	Won First Round series, 2–0 (Ferris State); Lost Quarterfinal, 2–3 (OT) (Michigan State)	
Buddy Powers (1994 — 2002)
1994–95	CCHA	27	18	7	2	-	-	-	38	2nd	38	25	11	2	.684	Won First Round series, 2–0 (Notre Dame); Lost Semifinal, 3–4 (OT) (Michigan)	
1995–96	CCHA	30	18	11	1	-	-	-	37	5th	41	26	14	1	.646	Won Quarterfinal series, 2–0 (Western Michigan); Lost Semifinal, 0–7 (Lake Superior State)	
1996–97	CCHA	27	10	12	5	-	-	-	25	T-5th	38	17	16	5	.513	Won Quarterfinal series, 2–0 (Lake Superior State); Lost Semifinal, 2–7 (Michigan)	
1997–98	CCHA	30	6	21	3	-	-	-	15	11th	38	8	27	3	.250		
1998–99	CCHA	30	13	14	3	-	-	-	29	7th	38	17	18	3	.487	Lost Quarterfinal series, 0–2 (Michigan)	
1999–00	CCHA	28	12	15	1	-	-	-	25	8th	37	17	19	1	.473	Won Quarterfinal series, 2–0 (Lake Superior State); Lost Play-in, 1–3 (Nebraska-Omaha)	
2000–01	CCHA	28	8	15	5	-	-	-	21	T-9th	40	16	19	5	.463	Won Quarterfinal series, 2–0 (Miami); Won Play-in, 2–1 (OT) (Northern Michigan); Lost Semifinal, 1–2 (Michigan State)	
2001–02	CCHA	28	7	18	3	-	-	-	17	11th	40	9	25	6	.300	Lost First Round series, 0–2 (Michigan State)	
Scott Paluch (2002 — 2009)
2002–03	CCHA	28	5	20	3	-	-	-	13	11th	36	8	25	3	.264	Lost First Round series, 0–2 (Michigan)	
2003–04	CCHA	28	9	13	6	-	-	-	24	9th	38	11	18	9	.408	Lost First Round series, 0–2 (Ohio State)	
2004–05	CCHA	28	13	12	3	-	-	-	29	5th	36	16	16	4	.500	Lost First Round series, 0–2 (Alaska-Fairbanks)	
2005–06	CCHA	28	8	18	2	-	-	-	18	12th	38	13	23	2	.368	Lost First Round series, 0–2 (Nebraska-Omaha)	
2006–07	CCHA	28	5	22	1	-	-	-	11	12th	38	7	29	2	.211	Lost First Round series, 0–2 (Nebraska-Omaha)	
2007–08	CCHA	28	13	15	0	-	-	-	26	T-7th	39	18	21	0	.462	Won First Round series, 2–1 (Lake Superior State); Lost Quarterfinal series, 0–2 (Miami)	
2008–09	CCHA	28	8	19	1	-	-	0	17	12th	38	11	24	3	.329	Lost CCHA First Round series, 0–2 (Ohio State)	
Dennis Williams (2009 — 2010)
2009–10	CCHA	28	4	18	6	-	-	5	23	11th	36	5	25	6	.222	Lost First Round series, 0–2 (Nebraska-Omaha)	
Chris Bergeron (2010 — 2019)
2010–11	CCHA	28	3	21	4	-	-	2	15	11th	41	10	27	4	.293	Won First Round series, 2–1 (Northern Michigan); Lost Quarterfinal series, 0–2 (Michigan)	
2011–12	CCHA	28	5	19	4	-	-	3	22	11th	44	14	25	5	.375	Won First Round series, 2–1 (Northern Michigan); Won Quarterfinal series, 2–1 (Ferris State); Lost Semifinals 3–2 (2OT) (Michigan); Lost Consolation Game 1–4 (Miami)	
2012–13	CCHA	28	10	15	3	-	-	1	34	9th	41	15	21	5	.427	Won First Round series, 2–1 (Lake Superior State); Lost Quarterfinal series, 0–2 (Notre Dame)	
2013–14	WCHA	28	13	11	4	-	-	–	30	T-3rd	39	18	15	6	.538	Won First Round series, 2–0 (Michigan Tech); Lost Semifinals, 0–4 (Minnesota State)	
2014–15	WCHA	28	17	8	3	–	-	-	37	3rd	39	23	11	5	.654	Won First Round series, 2–0 (Northern Michigan); Lost Semifinals, 2–5 (Michigan Tech)	
2015–16	WCHA	28	16	7	5	–	-	-	37	3rd	42	22	14	6	.595	Won First Round series, 2–1 (Bemidji State); Lost Semifinals, 1–2 (Minnesota State)	
2016–17	WCHA	28	14	13	1	-	-	1	44	4th	41	21	18	2	.537	Won First Round series, 2–0 (Ferris State); Won Semifinals series, 2–0 (Bemidji State); Lost Championship, 2–3 (2OT) (Michigan Tech)	
2017–18	WCHA	28	17	6	-	-	5	2	58	3rd	41	23	12	6	.634	Won First Round series, 2–0 (Ferris State); Lost Semifinals series, 1–2 (Northern Michigan)	
2018–19	WCHA	28	16	8	4	-	-	3	55	3rd	41	25	11	5	.671	Won First Round series, 2–0 (Michigan Tech); Won Semifinals series, 2–0 (Northern Michigan); Lost Championship, 2–3 (OT) (Minnesota State)	Lost Regional semifinal, 1–2 (OT) (Minnesota–Duluth)
Ty Eigner (2019 — 2024)
2019–20	WCHA	28	14	10	4	-	-	3	49	T–4th	38	21	13	4	.605	Won First Round series, 2–0 (Alaska); Tournament cancelled	
2020–21	WCHA	14	8	5	1	0	2	0	27	T–2nd	31	20	10	1	.661	Lost First Round series, 1–2 (Northern Michigan)	
2021–22	CCHA	26	11	14	1	2	1	0	33	6th	37	15	19	3	.446	Lost Quarterfinal series, 1–2 (Bemidji State)	
2022–23	CCHA	26	12	12	2	0	2	1	41	3rd	36	15	19	2	.444	Lost Quarterfinal series, 0–2 (Ferris State)	
2023–24	CCHA	24	11	12	1	1	1	1	35	6th	36	13	22	1	.375	Lost Quarterfinal series, 0–2 (Michigan Tech)	
Dennis Williams (2024 — present)
2024–25	CCHA	26	12	10	4	2	3	2	.551	4th	36	18	14	4	.556	Won Quarterfinal series, 2–0 (Michigan Tech); Lost Semifinal, 1–3 (St. Thomas)	
2025–26	CCHA	26	15	7	4	3	2	1	49	T–4th	36	18	11	7	.597	Lost Quarterfinal series, 0–2 (Michigan Tech)	
Totals											GP	W	L	T	%	Championships	
Regular season											2014	1001	860	163	.535	2 MCHA Championships, 7 CCHA Championships	
Conference Post-season											169	87	80	2	.521	4 CCHA tournament championships	
NCAA Post-season											22	7	14	1	.341	10 NCAA Tournament appearances	
Regular season and Post-season Record											2205	1085	954	166	.530	1 NCAA Division I National Championship	

* Winning percentage is used when conference schedules are unbalanced.
