= 2024–25 Bowling Green Falcons men's ice hockey season =

- Conference: 4th CCHA
- Home ice: Slater Family Ice Arena

Rankings
- USCHO: NR
- USA Hockey: NR

Record
- Overall: 18–14–4
- Conference: 12–10–4
- Home: 10–5–3
- Road: 8–9–1

Coaches and captains
- Head coach: Dennis Williams
- Assistant coaches: Curtis Carr; Stavros Paskaris; Dylan Schoen
- Captain(s): Ryan O'Hara; Ethan Scardina
- Alternate captain(s): Ville Immonen; Dalton Norris

The 2024–25 Bowling Green Falcons men's ice hockey season was the 56th season of play for the program and the 46th in the CCHA. The Falcons represented Bowling Green State University, played their home games at the Slater Family Ice Arena and were coached by Dennis Williams in his 1st full season, having served as the interim head coach during the 2009–2010 season.

== Season ==
After a third consecutive losing season and a hazing scandal to boot, Bowling Green turned to former player and interim head coach Dennis Williams to right the ship. One issue Williams did not have to contend with was a great deal of roster turnover as the program lost only two players to graduation while none departed through the transfer portal. Despite a largely intact lineup, the team had a little trouble early in the season. While Bowling Green was able to post seven wins in the first half of the season, all of those victories came against teams that finished the year at or near the bottom of the national rankings. The result was, in spite of a .500 record, the Falcons were ranked just above the bottom quarter of teams in the nation by Christmas.

Regardless of their national rankings, BGSU was seeing improvements as the season progressed. Once Christian Stoever returned from an injury and was able to resume the starting role, the team began to string some wins together. The Falcons went 9–2–2 in the middle of the year to lift themselves up near the top of the conference standings, all but guaranteeing them a home site the conference quarterfinals. The absence of Stoever for a stretch in February nearly cost the team its position in the standings but he returned just in time to force Michigan Tech to come to Ohio for their matchup.

Stoever continued his torrid pace into the postseason, surrendering just 1 goals to the Huskies in their two wins. The Falcons were able to end a six-game playoff losing streak and advance for the first time in five years. With the team just two wins away from a tournament berth, they travelled to face St. Thomas for the semifinal. After exchanging goals in the second, Bowling Green fell behind in the third and began firing the puck on goal every chance they got in an effort to tie the match. Unfortunately, their mediocre offense was unable to find the equalizer and, once Stoever had been pulled for an extra attacker, an empty-net goal in the final minute of play put the final nail in the team's season.

== Departures ==
Player	Position	Nationality	Cause
Spencer Kersten	Forward	Canada	Graduation (signed with Orlando Solar Bears)
Josh Nodler	Defenseman	United States	Graduation (signed with Jacksonville Icemen)

== Recruiting ==
Player	Position	Nationality	Age	Notes
Ville Immonen	Forward	Finland	25	Seinäjoki, FIN; graduate transfer from Union
Matvei Kabanov	Forward	Russia	21	Togliatti, RUS; transfer from Northern Michigan
Ivan Korodiuk	Defenseman	Ukraine	20	Kyiv, UKR; joined mid-season
Max Martin	Forward	United States	20	Tawas City, MI
Jackson Niedermayer	Forward	United States	23	Newport Beach, CA; transfer from Arizona State
Adam Žlnka	Forward	Slovakia	20	Detva, SVK; selected 204th overall in 2022

== Roster ==
As of December 31, 2024.

No.	Nat.	Player	Class	Pos	Height	Weight	DoB	Hometown	Previous team	NHL rights
2	(Canada)	Ben Wozney	Senior	D	6' 4" (1.93 m)	194 lb (88 kg)	2001-06-15	Richmond, British Columbia	Penticton Vees (BCHL)	—
3	(Ukraine)	Ivan Korodiuk	Freshman	D	6' 4" (1.93 m)	194 lb (88 kg)	2004-01-05	Kyiv, Ukraine	Madison Capitols (USHL)	—
4	(United States)	Nick O'Hanisain	Sophomore	D	5' 11" (1.8 m)	181 lb (82 kg)	2002-02-09	Detroit, Michigan	Minot Minotauros (NAHL)	—
5	(Sweden)	Gustav Stjernberg	Sophomore	D	6' 4" (1.93 m)	208 lb (94 kg)	2002-10-12	Enebyberg, Sweden	Des Moines Buccaneers (USHL)	—
6	(United States)	Michael Bevilacqua	Sophomore	D	6' 0" (1.83 m)	187 lb (85 kg)	2003-01-26	Hamburg, New York	Des Moines Buccaneers (USHL)	—
7	(United States)	Spencer Schneider	Senior	F	5' 11" (1.8 m)	159 lb (72 kg)	2000-09-11	Lakeville, Minnesota	Aberdeen Wings (NAHL)	—
8	(Canada)	Brandon Santa Juana	Sophomore	F	5' 8" (1.73 m)	173 lb (78 kg)	2002-08-05	Langley, British Columbia	Salmon Arm Silverbacks (BCHL)	—
10	(Slovakia)	Adam Žlnka	Freshman	F	6' 0" (1.83 m)	179 lb (81 kg)	2004-02-28	Detva, Slovakia	Des Moines Buccaneers (USHL)	UTA, 204th overall 2022
11	(Canada)	Adam Schankula	Sophomore	F	6' 2" (1.88 m)	190 lb (86 kg)	2003-06-21	Newmarket, Ontario	Youngstown Phantoms (USHL)	—
12	(United States)	Jackson Niedermayer	Junior	F	6' 0" (1.83 m)	196 lb (89 kg)	2001-03-11	Newport Beach, California	Arizona State (NCAA)	—
13	(Canada)	Brett Pfoh	Junior	F	5' 11" (1.8 m)	179 lb (81 kg)	2002-01-22	Port Moody, British Columbia	Spruce Grove Saints (AJHL)	—
14	(United States)	Dalton Norris (A)	Junior	D	5' 10" (1.78 m)	183 lb (83 kg)	2001-09-28	Oxford, Michigan	Lincoln Stars (USHL)	—
15	(United States)	Max Martin	Freshman	F	6' 0" (1.83 m)	183 lb (83 kg)	2003-10-02	Tawas City, Michigan	Wisconsin Windigo (NAHL)	—
16	(Canada)	Brayden Krieger	Senior	F	6' 0" (1.83 m)	160 lb (73 kg)	2001-02-09	Elora, Ontario	Brooks Bandits (AJHL)	—
17	(Canada)	Ethan Scardina (C)	Graduate	F	6' 1" (1.85 m)	192 lb (87 kg)	2000-11-02	South Surrey, British Columbia	Nanaimo (BCHL)	—
18	(United States)	Quinn Emerson	Junior	F	6' 0" (1.83 m)	180 lb (82 kg)	2001-03-12	Manhattan Beach, California	Wenatchee Wild (BCHL)	—
20	(Canada)	Ryan O'Hara (C)	Senior	F	5' 10" (1.78 m)	175 lb (79 kg)	2001-07-18	Oakville, Ontario	Waterloo Black Hawks (USHL)	—
21	(Canada)	Seth Fyten	Graduate	F	6' 2" (1.88 m)	187 lb (85 kg)	2000-11-23	Didsbury, Alberta	Spruce Grove Saints (AJHL)	—
22	(Canada)	Owen Ozar	Senior	F	5' 9" (1.75 m)	156 lb (71 kg)	2000-04-05	Prince Albert, Saskatchewan	Denver (NCHC)	—
23	(United States)	Ben Doran	Sophomore	F	5' 11" (1.8 m)	177 lb (80 kg)	2003-02-27	Chesterfield, Missouri	Sioux City Musketeers (USHL)	—
24	(Canada)	Eric Parker	Junior	D	6' 2" (1.88 m)	185 lb (84 kg)	2001-01-15	Calgary, Alberta	Okotoks Oilers (AJHL)	—
25	(Germany)	Tommy Pasanen	Graduate	D	6' 4" (1.93 m)	218 lb (99 kg)	2001-07-30	Schweinfurt, Germany	Clarkson (ECAC)	—
26	(United States)	Jack Blake	Junior	D	6' 1" (1.85 m)	185 lb (84 kg)	2001-09-21	Manhattan Beach, California	Oakville Blades (OJHL)	—
27	(Canada)	Breck McKinley	Sophomore	D	5' 9" (1.75 m)	175 lb (79 kg)	2003-10-08	St. Albert, Alberta	Spruce Grove Saints (AJHL)	—
28	(United States)	Jaden Grant	Junior	F	6' 2" (1.88 m)	192 lb (87 kg)	2002-09-02	White Lake, Michigan	Youngstown Phantoms (USHL)	—
29	(Canada)	Brody Waters	Sophomore	F	6' 2" (1.88 m)	203 lb (92 kg)	2002-04-09	Heidelberg, Ontario	Nanaimo Clippers (BCHL)	—
30	(United States)	Christian Stoever	Senior	G	6' 3" (1.91 m)	175 lb (79 kg)	2000-04-16	Northville, Michigan	New Jersey Titans (NAHL)	—
31	(United States)	Peter Eigner	Senior	G	6' 1" (1.85 m)	190 lb (86 kg)	2002-05-04	Bowling Green, Ohio	Tri-State (Midget AAA)	—
33	(Finland)	Ville Immonen (A)	Graduate	F	6' 2" (1.88 m)	200 lb (91 kg)	1999-06-18	Seinäjoki, Finland	Union (ECAC)	—
34	(Canada)	Cole Moore	Sophomore	G	6' 6" (1.98 m)	198 lb (90 kg)	2003-06-04	Toronto, Ontario	Aberdeen Wings (NAHL)	—
35	(United States)	Salvatore Evola	Junior	G	6' 0" (1.83 m)	175 lb (79 kg)	2001-04-24	Rochester, Michigan	Johnstown Tomahawks (NAHL)	—
44	(Russia)	Matvei Kabanov	Sophomore	F	5' 11" (1.8 m)	160 lb (73 kg)	2003-01-15	Togliatti, Russia	Northern Michigan (CCHA)	—

== Standings ==
2024–25 Central Collegiate Hockey Association standings
	Conference record											Overall record					
	GP	W	L	T	OTW	OTL	SW	PTS	PCT ^	GF	GA	GP	W	L	T	GF	GA
#14 Minnesota State †*	26	18	5	3	3	1	1	56	.718	77	37	39	27	9	3	113	58
Augustana	16	9	5	2	1	1	1	30	.625	48	37	35	18	13	4	97	75
St. Thomas	26	13	9	4	1	1	1	42	.564	76	66	38	19	14	5	111	101
Bowling Green	26	12	10	4	2	3	2	43	.551	69	63	36	18	14	4	90	85
Michigan Tech	26	12	11	3	1	1	1	40	.513	75	69	36	16	17	3	95	96
Ferris State	26	12	13	1	1	0	0	36	.462	74	81	36	13	20	3	89	128
Bemidji State	26	10	12	4	3	1	4	36	.462	63	78	38	15	18	5	93	114
Lake Superior State	26	10	15	1	0	4	0	35	.449	71	76	36	12	22	2	93	115
Northern Michigan	26	4	20	2	1	1	2	16	.205	42	88	34	5	27	2	55	115
Championship: March 21, 2025 † indicates conference regular-season champion (MacNaughton Cup) * indicates conference tournament champion (Mason Cup)^ Because Augustana played a transition schedule of 16 games against conference opponents, winning percentage was used to determine conference position. Rankings: USCHO.com Top 20 Poll

== Schedule and results ==
Date	Time	Opponent^{#}	Rank^{#}	Site	TV	Decision	Result	Attendance	Record
Regular Season
October 5	7:07 pm	at Mercyhurst*		Mercyhurst Ice Center • Erie, Pennsylvania	FloHockey	Moore	W 2–1	1,156	1–0–0
October 6	7:07 pm	at Mercyhurst*		Mercyhurst Ice Center • Erie, Pennsylvania	FloHockey	Moore	W 5–4 ^{OT}	1,178	2–0–0
October 10	7:07 pm	Robert Morris*		Slater Family Ice Arena • Bowling Green, Ohio (Exhibition)	Midco Sports+		W 7–2		
October 13	5:07 pm	Simon Fraser*		Slater Family Ice Arena • Bowling Green, Ohio (Exhibition)	Midco Sports+		W 4–1		
October 17	7:00 pm	at #17 Western Michigan*		Lawson Arena • Kalamazoo, Michigan		Moore	L 2–6	2,179	2–1–0
October 19	7:07 pm	at RIT*		Blue Cross Arena • Rochester, New York	FloHockey	Moore	W 2–1 ^{OT}	10,566	3–1–0
October 25	7:07 pm	at #19 Ohio State*		Value City Arena • Columbus, Ohio		Moore	L 1–3	3,916	3–2–0
October 26	7:07 pm	#19 Ohio State*		Slater Family Ice Arena • Bowling Green, Ohio	Midco Sports+	Moore	L 0–2	4,563	3–3–0
November 1	7:07 pm	Ferris State		Slater Family Ice Arena • Bowling Green, Ohio	Midco Sports+	Moore	W 2–0	1,852	4–3–0 (1–0–0)
November 2	7:07 pm	Ferris State		Slater Family Ice Arena • Bowling Green, Ohio	Midco Sports+	Moore	W 5–4	2,268	5–3–0 (2–0–0)
November 15	8:07 pm	at St. Thomas		St. Thomas Ice Arena • Mendota Heights, Minnesota	Midco Sports+	Moore	T 2–2 ^{SOW}	653	5–3–1 (2–0–1)
November 16	7:07 pm	at St. Thomas		St. Thomas Ice Arena • Mendota Heights, Minnesota	Midco Sports+	Moore	L 3–6	524	5–4–1 (2–1–1)
November 29	7:07 pm	Michigan Tech		Slater Family Ice Arena • Bowling Green, Ohio	Midco Sports+	Moore	L 0–3	1,857	5–5–1 (2–2–1)
November 30	7:07 pm	Michigan Tech		Slater Family Ice Arena • Bowling Green, Ohio	Midco Sports+	Stoever	T 2–2 ^{SOW}	1,785	5–5–2 (2–2–2)
December 6	8:07 pm	at #15 Minnesota State		Mayo Clinic Health System Event Center • Mankato, Minnesota	Midco Sports+	Moore	L 1–4	3,779	5–6–2 (2–3–2)
December 7	7:07 pm	at #15 Minnesota State		Mayo Clinic Health System Event Center • Mankato, Minnesota	Midco Sports+	Moore	L 2–3 ^{OT}	3,982	5–7–2 (2–4–2)
December 13	7:07 pm	Northern Michigan		Slater Family Ice Arena • Bowling Green, Ohio	Midco Sports+	Stoever	W 2–0	1,654	6–7–2 (3–4–2)
December 14	7:07 pm	Northern Michigan		Slater Family Ice Arena • Bowling Green, Ohio	Midco Sports+	Stoever	W 4–3	1,777	7–7–2 (4–4–2)
December 29	3:00 pm	RIT*		Slater Family Ice Arena • Bowling Green, Ohio	Midco Sports+	Stoever	W 2–1	3,297	8–7–2
January 3	7:07 pm	at Lake Superior State		Taffy Abel Arena • Sault Ste. Marie, Michigan	Midco Sports+	Stoever	W 3–0	367	9–7–2 (5–4–2)
January 4	7:07 pm	at Lake Superior State		Taffy Abel Arena • Sault Ste. Marie, Michigan	Midco Sports+	Stoever	W 3–1	456	10–7–2 (6–4–2)
January 10	7:07 pm	Bemidji State		Slater Family Ice Arena • Bowling Green, Ohio	Midco Sports+	Stoever	W 4–3 ^{OT}	1,059	11–7–2 (7–4–2)
January 11	7:07 pm	Bemidji State		Slater Family Ice Arena • Bowling Green, Ohio	Midco Sports+	Stoever	T 4–4 ^{SOL}	2,553	11–7–3 (7–4–3)
January 17	7:07 pm	at Ferris State		Ewigleben Arena • Big Rapids, Michigan	Midco Sports+	Stoever	W 4–3	1,100	12–7–3 (8–4–3)
January 18	6:07 pm	at Ferris State		Ewigleben Arena • Big Rapids, Michigan	Midco Sports+	Moore	L 3–4	1,210	12–8–3 (8–5–3)
January 24	7:07 pm	Augustana		Slater Family Ice Arena • Bowling Green, Ohio	Midco Sports+	Stoever	L 0–1 ^{OT}	2,171	12–9–3 (8–6–3)
January 25	7:07 pm	Augustana		Slater Family Ice Arena • Bowling Green, Ohio	Midco Sports+	Stoever	T 1–1 ^{SOL}	3,132	12–9–4 (8–6–4)
January 31	7:07 pm	at Northern Michigan		Berry Events Center • Marquette, Michigan	Midco Sports+	Stoever	W 3–2 ^{OT}	2,071	13–9–4 (9–6–4)
February 1	7:07 pm	at Northern Michigan		Berry Events Center • Marquette, Michigan	Midco Sports+	Stoever	W 5–2	2,471	14–9–4 (10–6–4)
February 7	7:07 pm	St. Thomas		Slater Family Ice Arena • Bowling Green, Ohio	Midco Sports+	Moore	W 4–1	2,327	15–9–4 (11–6–4)
February 8	7:07 pm	St. Thomas		Slater Family Ice Arena • Bowling Green, Ohio	Midco Sports+	Moore	L 1–2	3,114	15–10–4 (11–7–4)
February 14	7:00 pm	at USNTDP*		USA Hockey Arena • Plymouth, Michigan (Exhibition)		Evola	L 4–6		
February 21	8:07 pm	at Bemidji State		Sanford Center • Bemidji, Minnesota	Midco Sports+	Moore	L 2–3	1,896	15–11–4 (11–8–4)
February 22	7:07 pm	at Bemidji State		Sanford Center • Bemidji, Minnesota	Midco Sports+	Moore	L 1–2 ^{OT}	1,796	15–12–4 (11–9–4)
February 28	7:07 pm	Lake Superior State		Slater Family Ice Arena • Bowling Green, Ohio	Midco Sports+	Stoever	L 3–4	2,232	15–13–4 (11–10–4)
March 1	7:07 pm	Lake Superior State		Slater Family Ice Arena • Bowling Green, Ohio	Midco Sports+	Stoever	W 5–3	2,616	16–13–4 (12–10–4)
CCHA Tournament
March 7	7:07 pm	Michigan Tech*		Slater Family Ice Arena • Bowling Green, Ohio (CCHA Quarterfinal Game 1)	Midco Sports+	Stoever	W 2–1 ^{OT}	1,750	17–13–4
March 8	7:07 pm	Michigan Tech*		Slater Family Ice Arena • Bowling Green, Ohio (CCHA Quarterfinal Game 2)	Midco Sports+	Stoever	W 4–0	2,605	18–13–4
March 15	5:07 pm	at St. Thomas*		St. Thomas Ice Arena • Mendota Heights, Minnesota (CCHA Semifinal)	Midco Sports+	Stoever	L 1–3	575	18–14–4
*Non-conference game. ^{#}Rankings from USCHO.com Poll. All times are in Eastern Time. Source:

== Scoring statistics ==
Name	Position	Games	Goals	Assists	Points	PIM
Ryan O'Hara	LW	36	11	22	33	16
Brody Waters	LW	36	16	6	22	20
Ben Doran	F	36	10	12	22	43
Brett Pfoh	F	32	5	13	18	16
Dalton Norris	D	36	2	15	17	17
Ethan Scardina	C	35	7	9	16	31
Ville Immonen	C	36	6	10	16	4
Gustav Stjernberg	D	30	4	12	16	35
Quinn Emerson	C/RW	35	6	8	14	10
Jaden Grant	F	34	5	8	13	20
Eric Parker	D	36	1	9	10	6
Max Martin	F	32	6	3	9	10
Jackson Niedermayer	LW	33	2	6	8	12
Breck McKinley	D	35	1	6	7	14
Matvei Kabanov	LW	13	2	4	6	2
Ben Wozney	D	36	1	5	6	19
Tommy Pasanen	D	35	2	3	5	37
Seth Fyten	F	30	1	4	5	22
Adam Žlnka	C/W	21	1	3	4	12
Owen Ozar	F	15	1	0	1	2
Ivan Korodiuk	D	17	0	1	1	4
Adam Schankula	F	1	0	0	0	0
Brayden Krieger	F	2	0	0	0	0
Nicholas O'Hanisain	D	4	0	0	0	0
Johannes Løkkeberg	C	9	0	0	0	4
Brandon Santa Juana	F	11	0	0	0	2
Jack Blake	D	13	0	0	0	2
Christian Stoever	G	18	0	0	0	0
Cole Moore	G	20	0	0	0	0
Bench	–	–	–	–	–	18
Total			90	159	249	397

== Goaltending statistics ==
Name	Games	Minutes	Wins	Losses	Ties	Goals Against	Saves	Shut Outs	SV %	GAA
Christian Stoever	18	1092:22	12	3	3	32	517	3	.942	1.76
Cole Moore	20	1113:19	6	11	1	52	504	1	.906	2.80
Empty Net	-	13:17	-	-	-	1	-	-	-	-
Total	36	3311:20	18	14	4	85	1021	4	.929	2.12

== Rankings ==
Poll	Week																											
Poll	Pre	1	2	3	4	5	6	7	8	9	10	11	12	13	14	15	16	17	18	19	20	21	22	23	24	25	26	27 (Final)
USCHO.com	NR	NR	NR	NR	NR	NR	NR	NR	NR	NR	NR	NR	–	NR	NR	NR	NR	NR	NR	NR	NR	NR	NR	NR	NR	NR	–	NR
USA Hockey	NR	NR	NR	NR	NR	NR	NR	NR	NR	NR	NR	NR	–	NR	NR	NR	NR	NR	NR	NR	NR	NR	NR	NR	NR	NR	NR	NR

Note: USCHO did not release a poll in week 12 or 26.
Note: USA Hockey did not release a poll in week 12.

== Awards and honors ==
Player	Award	Ref
Ryan O'Hara	All-CCHA Second Team	
Brody Waters	All-CCHA Second Team	
