= Denis Morel =

Canadian ice hockey official (born 1948)

Denis Morel (born December 13, 1948, in Quebec City, Quebec) is a retired National Hockey League referee. His career started in 1972 and ended in 1994. During his career (in which he wore a helmet from the mid-1980s until his retirement), he officiated over 1,200 regular season games and two Stanley Cup finals. He also officiated two All-Star games.

Was the official during the game in which Brad May scored the May Day goal to win game 4 in overtime for the Buffalo Sabres, sweeping the Boston Bruins, April 24, 1993. It was his last playoff game.

On Saturday, October 16, 1993, in the Chicago Blackhawks-Winnipeg Jets game in Winnipeg, Morel was the referee who allowed the controversial overtime goal by Jets forward Nelson Emerson to stand. After Blackhawks goaltender Ed Belfour had tried to clear the puck around the glass behind the Chicago net, the forechecking Emerson caught the puck with his right glove and skated with the puck in hand from behind the net to the side of side of the right goalpost, where he dropped the puck behind the goal line. The final score in the game was Winnipeg 1, Chicago 0.

On May 31, 2010, he was fired as Quebec-based amateur scout for the Montreal Canadiens.
