= Jack Vivian =

Canadian ice hockey player (1941–2021)

Biographical details
- Born: May 14, 1941; Strathroy, Ontario, Canada
- Died: February 17, 2021 (aged 79); Camden, Ohio, US
- Education: Adrian College

Coaching career (HC unless noted)
- 1966–1973: Bowling Green State (NCAA)
- 1974–1975: Cleveland Crusaders (WHA)

Head coaching record
- Overall: 68–53–8 (.558) NCAA; 21–21–2 (.500) WHA

John R. Vivian (May 14, 1941 – February 17, 2021) was a Canadian ice hockey player, college football player, ice hockey head coach, general manager, professional scout, and university administrator. He was most notable as the first head coach of the Bowling Green State University (BGSU) varsity ice hockey program and the then-youngest general manager in professional hockey with the Cleveland Crusaders of the World Hockey Association from 1973-76. He was a member of the Adrian College and Bowling Green State athletic halls of fame. He died in February 2021.

== Early life ==
Vivian grew up in Strathroy, Ontario, just west of London. After high school, Vivian joined the logging industry in Dryden, Ontario. He left to enroll at Adrian College in Adrian, Michigan, where he played football. He transferred to University of Vermont to play on the club ice hockey team for one year and then returned to Adrian. Vivian was awarded a Bachelor of Science degree from Adrian in 1966.

== Coaching career ==
In 1966, Vivian was recruited by Bowling Green to be a graduate assistant coach for the BGSU football team, coach the club hockey team, and help direct the completion of the new BGSU Ice Arena. With a new ice arena, ice hockey became a varsity sport in 1969 and Vivian became the varsity team's first head coach. In addition to coaching BGSU, Vivian also helped start the youth hockey program for the city of Bowling Green. Playing for two seasons without a conference, Vivian joined forces with four other hockey programs Lake Superior State, Ohio, Ohio State, and St. Louis University to create the Central Collegiate Hockey Association (CCHA). In 1973, Vivian directed BGSU to their first-ever CCHA Tournament championship.

On May 15, 1973, Vivian accepted the general manager position for the Cleveland Crusaders of the WHA. At the time, Vivian was the youngest general manager in major professional hockey. Crusaders head coach John Hanna was fired midseason 1974-75 and replaced by Vivian. Vivian coached the Crusaders to a 35-40-3 record after beginning the season 14-18-1.

== Career in professional hockey ==
In 1973, at the age of 32, Vivian was named general manager of the Cleveland Crusaders of the WHA. Vivian also coached the team for 44 games during the 1974-75 season. Vivian submitted his resignation from the Crusaders at the end of January 1976 after growing tension between him and Cleveland's biggest star, goaltender Gerry Cheevers, prompted Cheevers to quit and sign with the Boston Bruins of the rival National Hockey League. Crusader team owner Jay Moore rejected his resignation and Vivian stayed on through the end of the 1975-76 season before resigning again. The Crusaders folded after the 1975-76 season.

In 1976, Vivian became a scout for the New York Islanders. He was with the Islander organization for 17 seasons.

== Career in college athletic administration ==
After resigning from the Crusaders, Vivian was named the ice hockey facility director at Miami University. He oversaw the construction and opening of Goggin Ice Arena. He held the position until 1985.

== JRV Management and Consulting ==
Vivian was CEO of JRV Management and Consulting, a firm specializing in ice arena construction, operation and management.
