= Scott Paluch =

American ice hockey player and coach (born 1966)

Biographical details
- Born: March 9, 1966 (age 60); Chicago, Illinois, USA

Playing career
- 1984–1988: Bowling Green
- 1986: US National Junior Team
- 1988–1990: Peoria Rivermen
- Position: Defenseman

Coaching career (HC unless noted)
- 1990–1994: Bowling Green (assistant)
- 1994–2002: Boston College (assistant)
- 2002–2009: Bowling Green
- 2009–present: USA Hockey (regional manager)

Head coaching record
- Overall: 84-156-23 (.363)

Scott Paluch is the director of player development for USA Hockey and a former ice hockey player and coach.

== Career ==
After being selected by St. Louis in the 5th round of the 1984 NHL entry draft, Paluch debuted for Bowling Green a year after the Falcons won the National Championship. In four years under Jerry York Paluch was the team's top scoring defenseman three times, helping the Falcons win a regular season title and tournament title while also serving as team captain in his senior season. After graduating Paluch played two seasons with Peoria before retiring.

Paluch returned to Bowling Green as a volunteer assistant coach in 1990-91, remaining there until 1994 when he followed his former coach, Jerry York, to Boston College. Paluch remained in Boston for eight years before returning to his alma mater as head coach, replacing Buddy Powers in 2002–03. Paluch was tasked with repairing the fading program and while the Falcons produced some respectable years, Paluch was unable to get Bowling Green a winning season. Shortly after the 2008 economic crash, it was revealed that eliminating the university's varsity program was being considered as a way to save money. In the midst of the program's uncertainty Paluch accepted an offer to join USA Hockey, leaving assistant coach Dennis Williams to serve as interim coach for the 2009–10 season.

Paluch has continued with USA Hockey since 2009 and is currently the Regional Manager, American Development Model.

== Career statistics ==
			Regular season					Playoffs
Season	Team	League	GP	G	A	Pts	PIM	GP	G	A	Pts	PIM
1984–85	Bowling Green	CCHA	42	11	25	36	64	—	—	—	—	—
1985–86	Bowling Green	CCHA	34	10	11	21	44	—	—	—	—	—
1986–87	Bowling Green	CCHA	45	13	38	51	88	—	—	—	—	—
1987–88	Bowling Green	CCHA	44	14	47	61	88	—	—	—	—	—
1988–89	Peoria Rivermen	IHL	81	10	39	49	92	4	1	1	2	31
1989–90	Peoria Rivermen	IHL	79	10	28	38	59	5	0	1	1	8
NCAA totals			165	48	121	169	284	—	—	—	—	—
IHL totals			160	20	67	87	151	9	1	2	3	39

== Head coaching record ==
Record table
Season	Team	Overall	Conference	Standing	Postseason
Bowling Green Falcons (CCHA) (2002–2009)
2002–03	Bowling Green	8-25-3	5-20-3	11th	CCHA First Round
2003–04	Bowling Green	11-18-9	9-13-6	9th	CCHA First Round
2004–05	Bowling Green	16-16-4	13-12-3	5th	CCHA First Round
2005–06	Bowling Green	13-23-2	8-18-2	12th	CCHA First Round
2006–07	Bowling Green	7-29-2	5-22-1	12th	CCHA First Round
2007–08	Bowling Green	18-21-0	13-15-0	t-7th	CCHA Quarterfinals
2008–09	Bowling Green	11-24-3	8-19-1-0	12th	CCHA First Round
Bowling Green:		84-156-23	61-119-15		
Total:		84-156-23			
National champion Postseason invitational champion Conference regular season champion Conference regular season and conference tournament champion Division regular season champion Division regular season and conference tournament champion Conference tournament champion

== Awards and honors ==
Award	Year
All-CCHA First Team	1987–88
AHCA West First-Team All-American	1987–88
CCHA All-Tournament Team	1988
