= Gustav Stjernberg =

- Born: October 12, 2002 (age 23) Enebyberg, Sweden
- Height: 6 ft 4 in (193 cm)
- Weight: 208 lb (94 kg; 14 st 12 lb)
- Position: Defense
- Shoots: Right
- NHL team (P) Cur. team Former teams: Colorado Avalanche; Colorado Eagles (AHL); Örebro HK
- NHL draft: Undrafted
- Playing career: 2022–present

Gustav Stjernberg (born 12 October 2002) is a Swedish professional ice hockey defenseman who currently plays for the Colorado Eagles in the American Hockey League (AHL) while under contract as a prospect to the Colorado Avalanche of the National Hockey League (NHL).

== Playing career ==
Stjernberg played the majority of his junior career in Sweden. He began in the SDE Hockey system in his hometown of Enebyberg, a suburb of Stockholm. In 2018, he switched to the Örebro HK junior system and progressed up through the ranks. He made his first appearance at the top junior level during the 2019–20 season and played there almost exclusively during the following two seasons. In 2022, he played a single game for Örebro, getting his first taste of professional hockey. For his final season of junior eligibility, Stjernberg moved to North America and played for the Des Moines Buccaneers. At the beginning of the season he committed to attending Bowling Green State University the following fall.

In his rookie season with Bowling Green, Stjernberg led the team in scoring from the blueline and was one of the very few Falcons to finish the season with a positive plus-minus.

Stjernberg posted a 6 goals and 10 points in 25 games while serving as alternate captain as a junior for Bowling Green, before concluding his collegiate career at the completion of the 2025–26 season.

As an undrafted free agent, Stjernberg was signed to a two-year, entry-level contract with the Colorado Avalanche on 14 March 2026, and was assigned to play the remainder of the season with AHL affiliate, the Colorado Eagles.

== Career statistics ==
			Regular season					Playoffs
Season	Team	League	GP	G	A	Pts	PIM	GP	G	A	Pts	PIM
2017–18	SDE HF J18	J18 Elit	2	0	2	2	0	—	—	—	—	—
2018–19	Örebro HK J18	J18 Elit	16	2	1	3	2	—	—	—	—	—
2018–19	Örebro HK J18	J18 Allsvenskan	17	0	6	6	4	7	0	0	0	2
2019–20	Örebro HK J18	J18 Elit	21	5	13	18	87	—	—	—	—	—
2019–20	Örebro HK J18	J18 Allsvenskan	18	5	7	12	78	—	—	—	—	—
2019–20	Örebro HK J20	J20 SuperElit	1	0	0	0	0	—	—	—	—	—
2020–21	Örebro HK J20	J20 Nationell	18	2	3	5	20	—	—	—	—	—
2021–22	Örebro HK J20	J20 Nationell	47	10	19	29	83	6	1	4	5	6
2021–22	Örebro HK	SHL	1	0	0	0	0	—	—	—	—	—
2022–23	Des Moines Buccaneers	USHL	62	8	12	20	73	2	0	0	0	4
2023–24	Bowling Green State U.	CCHA	31	4	7	11	40	—	—	—	—	—
2024–25	Bowling Green State U.	CCHA	30	4	12	16	35	—	—	—	—	—
2025–26	Bowling Green State U.	CCHA	25	6	4	10	98	—	—	—	—	—
2025–26	Colorado Eagles	AHL	11	1	2	3	34	—	—	—	—	—
SHL totals			1	0	0	0	0	—	—	—	—	—
