= Dennis Williams (ice hockey) =

Canadian ice hockey player and coach

Williams, Dennis
Current position
- Title: Head coach
- Team: Bowling Green
- Conference: CCHA
- Record: 41–50–17 (.458)

Biographical details
- Born: August 14, 1979 (age 47); Stratford, Ontario, Canada

Playing career
- 1994–1997: Stratford Cullitons
- 1997–2001: Bowling Green
- 2001–2002: Odessa Jackalopes
- 2001–2002: Cambridge Hornets
- Position: Right wing

Coaching career (HC unless noted)
- 2002–2003: Bowling Green (graduate assistant)
- 2003–2004: Utica College (assistant)
- 2004–2007: Neumann University
- 2007–2008: Alabama-Huntsville (assistant)
- 2008–2009: Bowling Green (assistant)
- 2009–2010: Bowling Green (interim)
- 2010–2014: Amarillo Bulls
- 2014–2017: Bloomington Thunder
- 2017–2024: Everett Silvertips
- 2024–present: Bowling Green

Head coaching record
- Overall: Juniors: 540-271-12 NCAA: 76–82–25 Overall: 598-342-30

Dennis Williams (born August 14, 1979) is a Canadian ice hockey coach currently in charge of the Bowling Green men's hockey team of the CCHA. He was previously the head coach Everett Silvertips of the Western Hockey League. Williams was also the interim head coach at Bowling Green after the sudden resignation of Scott Paluch.

== Player Statistics ==
			Regular season
Season	Team	League	GP	G	A	Pts	PIM
1997–98	Bowling Green	CCHA	17	3	3	6
1998–99	Bowling Green	CCHA	33	4	1	5
1999–00	Bowling Green	CCHA	30	3	1	4
2000–01	Bowling Green	CCHA	37	2	3	5
2001–02	Odessa Jackalopes	CHL	5	0	0	0
2001–02	Cambridge Hornets	MLH	12	4	14	18
NCAA totals			117	12	8	20	198

== Amarillo Bulls ==
Williams was hired as the head coach of the NAHL's Amarillo Bulls ahead of the 2010–2011 season. In 4 years in Amarillo, Williams amassed 168 wins in 238 games behind the bench, highlighted by a 2013 Robertson Cup Championship.

== Bloomington Thunder ==
In his next stop, Williams was the head coach for the USHL's Bloomington Thunder, beginning with the 2014–2015 season. He coached multiple NHL draft picks and players during this time, and won 90 games in 3 seasons, including a trip to the Eastern Conference Finals in 2016.

== Everett Silvertips ==
Williams was hired as the head coach for the WHL's Everett Silvertips ahead of the 2017–2018 season. In 7 seasons at Everett, Williams totaled 282 wins, 4 U.S. division titles, 3 conference regular season titles, and one western conference championship. He was promoted to the dual role of head coach and general manager in July 2021. Additionally while at Everett, Williams also had stints with the Canadian national team at the World Juniors, winning a gold medal as an assistant in 2022 and as the head coach in 2023. He was a 2x Western Conference Coach of the Year, there were 11 NHL draftees that came through his program, and 16 players signed pro contracts at the NHL or AHL level.

== Return to Bowling Green ==
On March 27, 2024, Williams was named the next head coach at Bowling Green State University - a place where he played 4 years of hockey, had earned both a bachelor's degree and a master's degree, had worked as an assistant coach, and had been the interim head coach for a year when he was 29 years old. In his first year on campus, Williams increased the Falcons’ win total from the year before by 5. He also helped the Falcons win a playoff series for the first time in 5 seasons, sweeping the rival Michigan Tech Huskies from the Mason Cup playoffs before falling in the semifinals a week later. Ryan O’Hara and Brody Waters both were named 2nd-Team All-CCHA forwards for their efforts under Williams in his first year with the Falcons.

His 2nd season back in Bowling Green came with a completely different cast of characters. There were 14 new players, good for more than half of the roster, and he brought in the #1 ranked recruiting class in the country, a level of recruiting not seen in nearly 40 years at BGSU. Due to their youth, they started a bit slow, but they really rounded into form as the calendar turned to 2026, including a home win against Ohio State and a road sweep at Michigan Tech to end the regular season. The Falcons had D Brayden Crampton named to the CCHA All-Rookie team, and D Breck McKinley was named 2nd team All-CCHA. Also of note, the Falcons finished 2nd in the entire country in faceoff win percentage, an area of focus for Williams and his staff.

== College Head Coaching Record ==
Record table
Season	Team	Overall	Conference	Standing	Postseason
Neumann Knights (ECAC West) (2004–2007)
2004–05	Neumann	4–17–2	2–9–1	6th	
2005–06	Neumann	14–10–1	6–8–1	5th	
2006–07	Neumann	17–5–5	8–3–4	2nd	ECAC West Runner-Up
Neumann:		35–32–8	16–20–6		
Bowling Green Falcons (CCHA) (2009–2010)
2009–10	Bowling Green	5–25–6	4–18–6–5	11th	CCHA First Round
Bowling Green Falcons (CCHA) (2024–present)
2024–25	Bowling Green	18–14–4	12–10–4	4th	CCHA Semifinals
2025–26	Bowling Green	18–11–7	15–7–4	T–4th	CCHA Quarterfinals
Bowling Green:		41–50–17	31–35–14		
Total:		76–82–25			
National champion Postseason invitational champion Conference regular season champion Conference regular season and conference tournament champion Division regular season champion Division regular season and conference tournament champion Conference tournament champion

== Juniors Head Coaching Record ==
Team	Year	League	Regular season							Postseason
Team	Year	League	G	W	L	T	OTL	Pts	Finish	Result
AMA	2010–11	NAHL	58	36	16	0	6	78	2nd in South	Robertson Cup Semifinals
AMA	2011–12	NAHL	60	46	7	0	7	99	1st in South	Robertson Cup Semifinals
AMA	2012–13	NAHL	60	46	7	0	7	99	1st in South	Robertson Cup Champions
AMA	2013–14	NAHL	60	40	15	0	5	86	1st in South	NAHL South Division Finals
BLM	2014–15	USHL	60	29	24	0	7	65	5th in East	
BLM	2015–16	USHL	60	36	18	0	6	78	4th in East	USHL Eastern Conference Finals
BLM	2016–17	USHL	60	25	27	0	8	58	6th in East	
EVT	2017–18	WHL	72	47	20	2	3	99	1st in U.S.	WHL Finals Runner-Up (SC)
EVT	2018–19	WHL	68	47	16	2	3	99	1st in U.S.	WHL Second Round (SPO)
EVT	2019–20	WHL	64	46	13	3	1	96	2nd in U.S.	Season cancelled due to COVID-19 pandemic
EVT	2020–21	WHL	23	19	4	0	0	38	1st in U.S.	Playoffs cancelled due to COVID-19 pandemic
EVT	2021–22	WHL	68	45	13	5	5	100	1st in U.S.	WHL First Round (VAN)
EVT	2022–23	WHL	68	33	32	0	3	69	4th in U.S.	WHL First Round (POR)
EVT	2023–24	WHL	68	45	18	0	5	95	2nd in U.S.	WHL Second Round (POR)
AMA Totals		NAHL	238	168	45	0	25			
BLM Totals		USHL	180	90	69	0	21			
EVT Totals		WHL	431	282	116	12	20			
