= Jordan Sigalet =

Canadian ice hockey player and coach

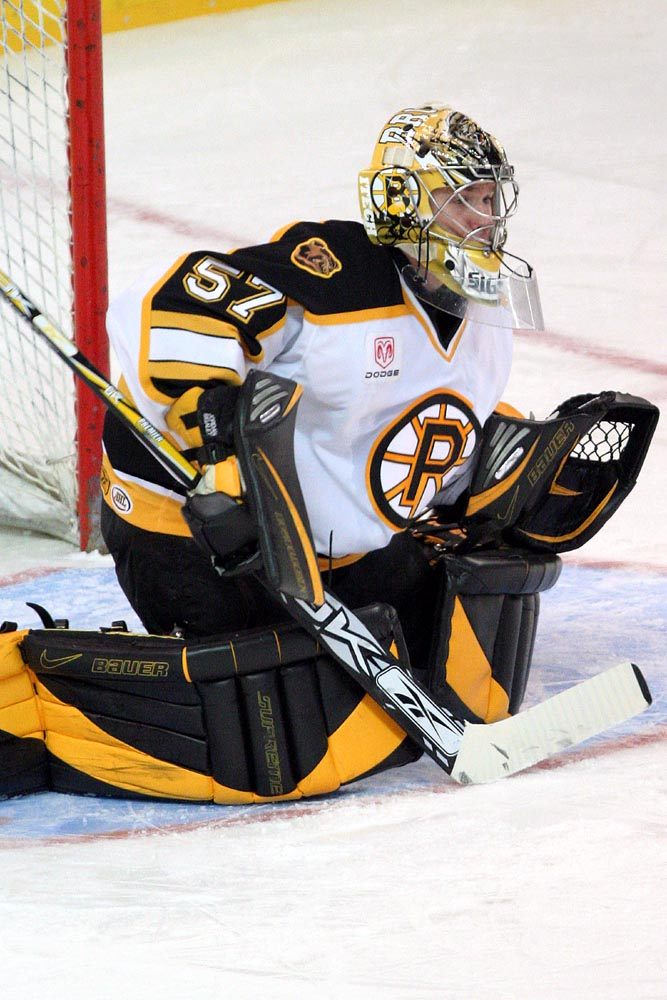
- Sigalet with the Providence Bruins in 2007
- Born: February 19, 1981 (age 45) New Westminster, British Columbia, Canada
- Height: 6 ft 1 in (185 cm)
- Weight: 180 lb (82 kg; 12 st 12 lb)
- Position: Goaltender
- Caught: Left
- Played for: Boston Bruins; Vienna Capitals
- NHL draft: 209th overall, 2001; Boston Bruins
- Playing career: 2006–2009

Jordan Marvin Sigalet (born February 19, 1981) is a Canadian ice hockey coach and former goaltender who played one game in the National Hockey League for the Boston Bruins in 2006. In 2004, while playing at Bowling Green University, Sigalet was diagnosed with Multiple Sclerosis. He continued playing until 2009 when he retired and turned to coaching. In 2014 he joined the Calgary Flames as their goaltending coach. His brother Jonathan also played in one NHL game with the Boston Bruins.

== Playing career ==
=== University ===
Sigalet played collegiate hockey at Bowling Green University. On February 27 and 28 2003, he played two games against Northern Michigan University. He stopped 66 shot attempts combined. Sigalet ended the 2003 NCAA hockey season in a playoff loss.

As a junior, Sigalet was diagnosed with multiple sclerosis in March 2004 but only announced his condition in December. Many fellow hockey players were inspired by him: the entire Nebraska-Omaha hockey team autographed a jersey and sent it to him. Players from University of Michigan and from Boston College also sent him signed items. In addition, he became the first goalie to hold the position of team captain at Bowling Green.

During the 2005 NCAA season, Sigalet blocked 92 percent of the shots taken against him. He was voted captain and named a Hobey Baker finalist.

=== Professional career ===
Sigalet was drafted by the Boston Bruins in the 2001 NHL entry draft. Sigalet made his NHL debut on January 7, 2006 against the Tampa Bay Lightning, as a backup for Andrew Raycroft. Raycroft sprained his ankle in the third period, letting Sigalet play the final 43 seconds.

On November 16, 2007, during a game with the Worcester Sharks, Sigalet collapsed on the ice due to Multiple Sclerosis. He was placed in rehab for a month to recover.

Sigalet joined the Vienna Capitals on 25 January 2009 and left Gazovik Tyumen.

== Coaching career ==
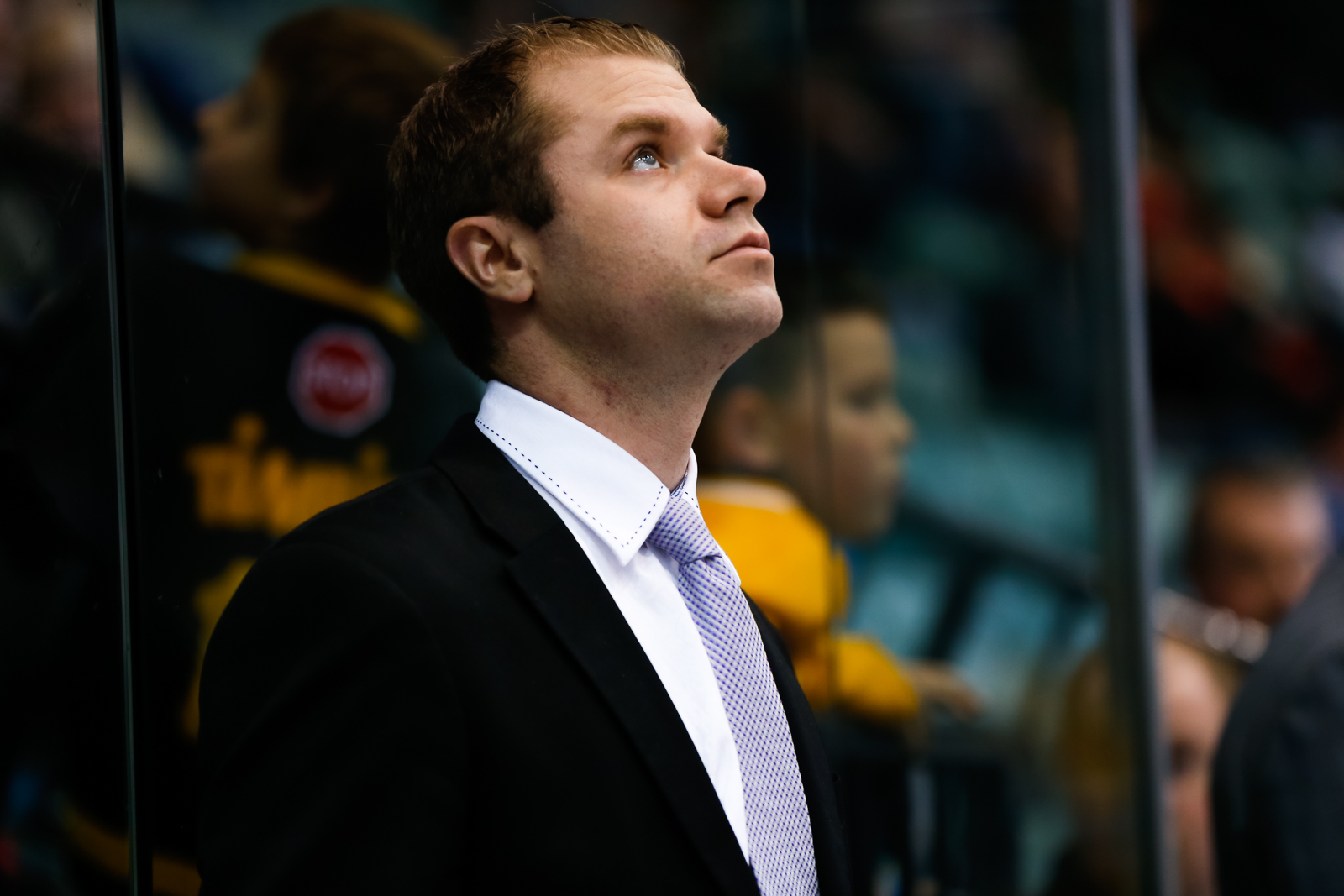
Jordan Sigalet in 2013

Sigalet was named goaltending coach of the Everett Silvertips August 3, 2010. On August 3, 2011 Sigalet was hired as a goaltending coach for the Abbotsford Heat of the American Hockey League. On August 19, 2014, the Calgary Flames of the National Hockey League announced Sigalet as their new goalie coach.

== Off the ice ==
Sigalet became an ambassador for the Multiple Sclerosis Rhode Island chapter. Sigalet participated in a fundraiser supported by the Providence Bruins and pharmaceutical company Serono (maker of MS treatment Rebif) called "Sigalet Saves For MS" that donated 20 dollars for every save he made.

== Career statistics ==
=== Regular season and playoffs ===
			Regular season									Playoffs
Season	Team	League	GP	W	L	T	MIN	GA	SO	GAA	SV%	GP	W	L	MIN	GA	SO	GAA	SV%
1998–99	Delta Ice Hawks	PIJHL	30	—	—	—	—	—	—	2.35	—	—	—	—	—	—	—	—	—
1999–00	Victoria Salsa	BCHL	33	20	10	0	1846	99	0	3.22	.904	5	—	—	—	—	—	3.27	.908
2000–01	Victoria Salsa	BCHL	48	23	22	0	2820	142	0	3.03	.919	18	12	5	1060	—	0	2.62	—
2001–02	Bowling Green University	CCHA	13	2	6	2	657	38	0	3.47	.909	—	—	—	—	—	—	—	—
2002–03	Bowling Green University	CCHA	20	6	11	2	1208	66	1	3.28	.910	—	—	—	—	—	—	—	—
2003–04	Bowling Green University	CCHA	37	10	17	9	2210	101	2	2.74	.919	—	—	—	—	—	—	—	—
2004–05	Bowling Green University	CCHA	32	16	12	3	1849	89	1	2.89	.915	—	—	—	—	—	—	—	—
2005–06	Boston Bruins	NHL	1	0	0	0	1	0	0	0.00	1.000	—	—	—	—	—	—	—	—
2005–06	Providence Bruins	AHL	37	19	11	2	1955	83	1	2.55	.900	3	0	2	159	10	0	3.77	.882
2006–07	Providence Bruins	AHL	25	15	5	2	1332	53	3	2.39	.915	2	0	0	32	0	0	0.00	1.000
2007–08	Providence Bruins	AHL	19	12	5	1	1049	44	0	2.52	.903	2	0	0	—	0	0	0.00	1.000
2008–09	Vienna Capitals	EBEL	4	—	—	—	—	—	1	2.38	.925	1	—	—	—	—	—	2.00	.926
2008–09	Gazovik Tyumen	RUS-2	6	2	3	0	—	—	0	2.40	.924	—	—	—	—	—	—	—	—
2008–09	Gazovik Tyumen-2	RUS-3	2	—	—	—	—	—	—	3.50	—	—	—	—	—	—	—	—	—
NHL totals			1	0	0	0	1	0	0	0.00	1.000	—	—	—	—	—	—	—	—

== Awards and achievements ==
Award	Year
All-CCHA First Team	2003-04
All-CCHA Second Team	2004-05
AHL Fred T. Hunt Memorial Award	2007–08

Awards and achievements
Preceded by Aaron Voros	Terry Flanagan Memorial Award; 2004–05	Succeeded by Steve McJannet
Preceded by Craig Kowalski	Perani Cup Champion; 2004-05	Succeeded by Jeff Jakaitis
