= Nelson Emerson =

Canadian ice hockey player

- Born: August 17, 1967 (age 59) Hamilton, Ontario, Canada
- Height: 5 ft 11 in (180 cm)
- Weight: 175 lb (79 kg; 12 st 7 lb)
- Position: Right wing
- Shot: Right
- Played for: St. Louis Blues; Winnipeg Jets; Hartford Whalers; Carolina Hurricanes; Chicago Blackhawks; Ottawa Senators; Atlanta Thrashers; Los Angeles Kings
- National team: Canada
- NHL draft: 44th overall, 1985; St. Louis Blues
- Playing career: 1990–2002
Medal record
Representing Canada
World Championships
Gold medal – first place	1994 Italy

Nelson Donald Emerson (born August 17, 1967) is a Canadian former professional ice hockey right winger and is currently the General manager for the AHL Ontario Reign. He played for eight teams in the National Hockey League during his 12-year career, which lasted from 1990 to 2002. Following his retirement, Emerson has worked within the Kings organization since 2006 and has served as the team's assistant general manager since 2022.

Emerson is perhaps best remembered today for scoring a controversial overtime goal in 1993 whereby he grabbed the puck out of midair with his hand, skated towards the opposing team's net and dropped it in the goal, resulting in a 1–0 win for his Jets.

== Playing career ==
Emerson grew up playing minor hockey in his hometown of Waterford, Ontario with the Waterford Wildcats of the OMHA. Emerson was selected in the 7th round (92nd overall) of the 1985 OHL Priority Selection by the Guelph Platers after spending the 1984-85 season with the Stratford Cullitons Jr.B. (OHA) club. Emerson, however, elected to pursue an NCAA scholarship and spent a second year playing with the Cullitons before attending Bowling Green State University (CCHA) in Ohio in 1986-87.

Emerson was drafted in the third round, 44th overall, by the St. Louis Blues in the 1985 NHL entry draft.

After playing four seasons at the Bowling Green State University, where Emerson was a 3-time finalist for the Hobey Baker Award, Emerson made his professional debut with the Blues' IHL affiliate, the Peoria Rivermen, at the end of the 1989–90 season. In his first and only full season with the Rivermen, 1990–91, he scored 36 goals and added 79 assists.

Emerson joined the Blues in the 1991–92 season, and scored 132 points in his two full seasons with them. He joined the Winnipeg Jets before the 1993–94 season, and had the most productive campaign of his NHL career that year (33 goals, 41 assists).

While playing with the Jets, Emerson scored a controversial overtime goal using his hand. In an October 16, 1993 game against the Chicago Blackhawks, with the game tied 0–0 in overtime, the Jets dumped the puck into the Blackhawks zone, prompting Chicago netminder Ed Belfour to skate behind the goal to clear the puck. The forechecking Emerson skated behind the goal, grabbing the puck out of midair from Belfour's clearing attempt with his hand, and with the puck cupped in his glove, skated towards the unguarded Chicago net and dropped the puck in the crease. Referee Denis Morel signaled for a good goal. Upon review of the play, the Jets' goal judge did not see the puck cross the line, and when video review proved inconclusive in determining a goal, Morel let his original call stand, resulting in a 1–0 victory for the Jets, despite intense protests from Blackhawks players and coach Darryl Sutter. In the years since his retirement, Emerson admits that the goal should not have counted and claims that following the play, the Jets team had faked a goal celebration to attempt and sell the erroneous call.

He would play one more season with the Jets before leaving for the Hartford Whalers before the 1995–96 season. Emerson played two seasons in Hartford, then moved along with the franchise as it relocated to become the Carolina Hurricanes in the 1997–98 season. During the 1998–99 season, Emerson became a member of the Chicago Blackhawks. Later in the same season, the Blackhawks traded him to the Ottawa Senators in exchange for Chris Murray.

Emerson joined the expansion Atlanta Thrashers in the 1999–2000 season, and played 58 games with them. He was traded late in the season, along with Kelly Buchberger, to the Los Angeles Kings in exchange for Donald Audette and Frantisek Kaberle. Emerson would remain with the Kings until retiring following the 2001–02 season.

Emerson appeared in 771 NHL games in his career, scoring 195 goals and adding 293 assists. He also appeared in 40 Stanley Cup playoff games, scoring seven goals and recording 15 assists.

Emerson was hired by the Los Angeles Kings as a video and player development consultant and, after 2 seasons, was promoted to assistant coach/development coordinator on August 4, 2008. He is currently Director of Player Personnel for the Kings.

== Executive career ==
Following his retirement from playing, Emerson has worked within the Los Angeles Kings organization since 2006 and has served as the team's assistant general manager since 2022. Prior to serving as assistant general manager, he worked various roles including assistant coach and director of player personnel. As Director of Player Personnel, a role he served for the team from 2008 to 2019, he won two Stanley Cups for championship victories in 2012 and 2014.

== Career statistics ==
=== Regular season and playoffs ===
			Regular season					Playoffs
Season	Team	League	GP	G	A	Pts	PIM	GP	G	A	Pts	PIM
1984–85	Stratford Cullitons	MWJHL	40	23	38	61	70	—	—	—	—	—
1985–86	Stratford Cullitons	MWJHL	39	54	58	112	91	—	—	—	—	—
1986–87	Bowling Green Falcons	CCHA	45	26	35	61	28	—	—	—	—	—
1987–88	Bowling Green Falcons	CCHA	45	34	49	83	54	—	—	—	—	—
1988–89	Bowling Green Falcons	CCHA	44	22	46	68	46	—	—	—	—	—
1989–90	Bowling Green Falcons	CCHA	44	30	52	82	42	—	—	—	—	—
1989–90	Peoria Rivermen	IHL	3	1	1	2	0	—	—	—	—	—
1990–91	Peoria Rivermen	IHL	73	36	79	115	91	17	9	12	21	16
1990–91	St. Louis Blues	NHL	4	0	3	3	2	—	—	—	—	—
1991–92	St. Louis Blues	NHL	79	23	36	59	66	6	3	3	6	21
1992–93	St. Louis Blues	NHL	82	22	51	73	62	11	1	6	7	6
1993–94	Winnipeg Jets	NHL	83	33	41	74	80	—	—	—	—	—
1994–95	Winnipeg Jets	NHL	48	14	23	37	26	—	—	—	—	—
1995–96	Hartford Whalers	NHL	81	29	29	58	78	—	—	—	—	—
1996–97	Hartford Whalers	NHL	66	9	29	38	34	—	—	—	—	—
1997–98	Carolina Hurricanes	NHL	81	21	24	45	50	—	—	—	—	—
1998–99	Carolina Hurricanes	NHL	35	8	13	21	36	—	—	—	—	—
1998–99	Chicago Blackhawks	NHL	27	4	10	14	13	—	—	—	—	—
1998–99	Ottawa Senators	NHL	3	1	1	2	2	4	1	3	4	0
1999–2000	Atlanta Thrashers	NHL	58	14	19	33	47	—	—	—	—	—
1999–2000	Los Angeles Kings	NHL	5	1	1	2	0	1	0	0	0	0
2000–01	Los Angeles Kings	NHL	78	11	11	22	54	13	2	2	4	4
2001–02	Los Angeles Kings	NHL	41	5	2	7	25	5	0	1	1	2
NHL totals			771	195	293	488	575	40	7	15	22	33

=== International ===
Year	Team	Event	GP	G	A	Pts	PIM
1992	Canada	WC	3	0	1	1	2
1994	Canada	WC	8	2	2	4	4
1998	Canada	WC	6	2	1	3	2
Senior totals			17	4	4	8	8

== Awards and honours ==
Award	Year
All-CCHA First Team	1987–88
AHCA West Second-Team All-American	1987–88
All-CCHA Second Team	1988–89
All-CCHA First Team	1989–90
AHCA West First-Team All-American	1989–90
IHL Gary F. Longman Memorial Trophy (Most Outstanding Rookie)	1990–91
Stanley Cup (as executive)	2012, 2014

Awards and achievements
Preceded by Joe Murphy	CCHA Rookie of the Year; 1986–87	Succeeded by John DePourcq
