= John Markell =

- Born: October 3, 1956 (age 70) Cornwall, Ontario, Canada
- Height: 5 ft 11 in (180 cm)
- Weight: 176 lb (80 kg; 12 st 8 lb)
- Position: Right wing
- Shot: Left
- NHL draft: Undrafted
- Playing career: 1979–1992
- Coaching career

Biographical details
- Education: Bowling Green State

Playing career
- 1973-1975: Cornwall Royals
- 1975-1979: Bowling Green
- 1979-1981: Tulsa Oilers
- 1979-1981: Winnipeg Jets
- 1981-1983: Salt Lake Golden Eagles
- 1983-1984: Montana Magic
- 1983-1984: St. Louis Blues
- 1984-1985: Schwenninger ERC
- 1984-1985: Springfield Indians
- 1984-1985: Minnesota North Stars
- 1985-1987: EC Bad Nauheim
- 1987-1992: EHC Wolfsburg
- Position: Wing

Coaching career (HC unless noted)
- 1991–1992: EHC Wolfsburg
- 1995–2010: Ohio State
- 2012–2013: Dallas Stars (Scout)

Head coaching record
- Overall: 280–267–56 (.511)
- Tournaments: 2–6 (.250)

Accomplishments and honors

Championships
- 2004 CCHA Tournament champion

Awards
- 1998 CCHA Coach of the Year

John Richard Markell (born October 3, 1956) is a Canadian ice hockey coach and former professional player. Markell played 55 games in the National Hockey League and later coached Ohio State University.

Born in Cornwall, Ontario, Markell attended Bowling Green State University, where he was a four-year letter winner and served as an assistant captain as a senior on the Falcon hockey team that went 37-6-2. He was BG's leading scorer as a junior with 61 points after leading the team in goals as a sophomore with 26. Markell finished his career with 235 points, including 102 career goals. He also had 133 career assists. Markell was voted BG's outstanding forward in 1978 and 1979. After going undrafted, Markell played 55 National Hockey League games: 52 with the Winnipeg Jets, two with the St. Louis Blues and one with the Minnesota North Stars. In his NHL career, Markell scored 11 goals and 10 assists.

Markell served as the head coach of the Ohio State University ice hockey team from 1995 until the end of the 2009-10 season. The seventh Buckeye head coach, he led the team to the NCAA tournament six times, marking the first appearances in program history, with an NCAA Frozen Four appearance in 1998. His contract was not renewed following the 2010 season.

== Career statistics ==
=== Regular season and playoffs ===
			Regular season					Playoffs
Season	Team	League	GP	G	A	Pts	PIM	GP	G	A	Pts	PIM
1973–74	Cornwall Royals	QMJHL	18	4	1	5	0	4	1	3	4	0
1974–75	Cornwall Royals	QMJHL	41	10	19	29	20	—	—	—	—	—
1975–76	Bowling Green State University	CCHA	39	33	28	61	81	—	—	—	—	—
1976–77	Bowling Green State University	CCHA	39	26	32	58	48	—	—	—	—	—
1977–78	Bowling Green State University	CCHA	39	33	28	61	81	—	—	—	—	—
1978–79	Bowling Green State University	CCHA	42	31	49	80	96	—	—	—	—	—
1979–80	Winnipeg Jets	NHL	38	10	7	17	21	—	—	—	—	—
1979–80	Tulsa Oilers	CHL	35	15	14	29	45	—	—	—	—	—
1980–81	Winnipeg Jets	NHL	14	1	3	4	15	—	—	—	—	—
1980–81	Tulsa Oilers	CHL	48	24	18	42	34	8	5	1	6	28
1981–82	Salt Lake Golden Eagles	CHL	69	19	53	72	33	10	4	11	15	2
1982–83	Salt Lake Golden Eagles	CHL	77	33	27	60	35	6	3	2	5	6
1983–84	Montana Magic	CHL	69	44	40	84	61	—	—	—	—	—
1983–84	St. Louis Blues	NHL	2	0	0	0	0	—	—	—	—	—
1984–85	Schwenninger ERC	GER	23	13	15	28	65	—	—	—	—	—
1984–85	Minnesota North Stars	NHL	1	0	0	0	0	—	—	—	—	—
1984–85	Springfield Indians	AHL	46	16	25	41	23	4	3	1	4	11
1985–86	EC Bad Nauheim	GER-2	43	37	74	111	78	10	12	30	42	28
1986–87	EC Bad Nauheim	GER-2	43	52	58	110	66	18	24	33	57	34
1987–88	ESC Wolfsburg	GER-2	35	36	62	98	100	20	26	52	78	59
1988–89	ESC Wolfsburg	GER-2	34	28	52	80	62	18	21	24	45	41
1989–90	ESC Wolfsburg	GER-2	33	39	43	82	42	19	8	16	24	—
1990–91	ESC Wolfsburg	GER-2	32	28	53	81	52	—	—	—	—	—
1991–92	ESC Wolfsburg	GER-2	—	—	—	—	—	—	—	—	—	—
CHL totals			298	135	152	287	208	24	12	14	26	36
NHL totals			55	11	10	21	36	—	—	—	—	—

== Head coaching record ==
=== College ===
Record table
Season	Team	Overall	Conference	Standing	Postseason
Ohio State Buckeyes (CCHA) (1995–2010)
1994–95	Ohio State	2-7-0†	1-5-0†	10th	CCHA quarterfinals
1995–96	Ohio State	10–19–5	8–17–5	8th	CCHA quarterfinals
1996–97	Ohio State	12–25–2	9–16–2	7th	CCHA quarterfinals
1997–98	Ohio State	27–13–2	19–10–1	3rd	NCAA Frozen Four
1998–99	Ohio State	21–16–4	17–10–3	3rd	NCAA East Regional Quarterfinals
1999–00	Ohio State	13–19–4	9–16–3	11th	
2000–01	Ohio State	17–18–2	13–13–2	7th	CCHA first round
2001–02	Ohio State	20–16–4	12–12–4	t-7th	CCHA semifinals
2002–03	Ohio State	25–13–5	16–8–4	t-5th	NCAA East Regional semifinals
2003–04	Ohio State	26–16–0	16–12–0	4th	NCAA East Regional semifinal
2004–05	Ohio State	27–11–4	25–9–2	2nd	NCAA West Regional semifinal
2005–06	Ohio State	15–19–5	11–14–3	10th	CCHA first round
2006–07	Ohio State	15–17–5	12–12–4	7th	CCHA first round
2007–08	Ohio State	12–25–4	7–18–3	11th	CCHA first round
2008–09	Ohio State	23–15–4	13–11–4–3	5th	NCAA Northeast Regional semifinal
2009–10	Ohio State	15–18–6	10–12–6–4	8th	CCHA quarterfinals
Ohio State:		280–267–56	198–195–47		
Total:		280–267–56			
National champion Postseason invitational champion Conference regular season champion Conference regular season and conference tournament champion Division regular season champion Division regular season and conference tournament champion Conference tournament champion

† Markell assumed the head coaching position when Jerry Welsh resigned midseason.

== Awards and honours ==
Award	Year
All-CCHA First Team	1976-77
All-CCHA First Team	1977-78
All-CCHA First Team	1978-79

Awards and achievements
Preceded by Mike Liut	CCHA Player of the Year; 1977–78 (With Don Waddell)	Succeeded by Ken Morrow
Preceded by Mark Mazzoleni	CCHA Coach of the Year; 1997–98	Succeeded by Ron Mason
