= Brian Hills =

Canadian ice hockey player (born 1959)

- Born: January 12, 1959 (age 67) Windsor, Ontario, Canada
- Height: 5 ft 10 in (178 cm)
- Weight: 181 lb (82 kg; 12 st 13 lb)
- Position: Forward
- Shot: Left
- Played for: SC Herisau; EHC Chur; SC Rapperswil-Jona Lakers; EC Kassel
- Playing career: 1983–1994
- Coaching career

Biographical details
- Education: Bowling Green State

Coaching career (HC unless noted)
- 1994–2001: Bowling Green (assistant)
- 2001–2005: Geneseo State
- 2005–2025: RIT (assistant)

Head coaching record
- Overall: 53–42–14 (.550)
- Tournaments: 0–1

Accomplishments and honors

Championships
- 2005 SUNYAC Tournament Champion

Awards
- Terry Flanagan Award (2011)

Brian Hills (born August 17, 1959) is a Canadian ice hockey former coach and player. He was an All-American for Bowling Green and later served as an assistant coach for 20 years under former teammate Wayne Wilson at RIT.

== Playing career ==
Hills played ice hockey at Bowling Green State University at the same time as current RIT head coach Wayne Wilson, where they were teammates. Hills was a two-time All-American and two-time Hobey Baker Memorial Award finalist. He led the Central Collegiate Hockey Association (CCHA) in scoring twice and was the CCHA Player of the Year in 1983. In addition, Hills was a two-time CCHA All-Academic team member and was a second-team CoSIDA/GTE Academic All-American as a senior. Hills left Bowling Green as its all-time leading scorer and is currently second on the list. He scored 116 goals and added 154 assists for 270 points in 156 games. In 1982-83, he set a school single-season record that still stands with 94 points (37-57-94) in 40 games. Hills led the Falcons in scoring during his final three seasons.

After graduating from Bowling Green with a degree in business administration, Hills spent 11 seasons playing professionally in Europe (eight years in Switzerland and three in Germany). He won three gold medals with Team Canada in Europe's Spengler Cup.

== Coaching career ==
Hills spent seven years (1994-2001) as an assistant coach with Bowling Green. During that time, he assisted with Team Canada's national team selection committee in 1997 and 1998. He also coached the Chur (Switzerland) Junior Hockey Team in 1986-87. He would later become the head coach at SUNY Geneseo, a position he would hold for four seasons, where he led the Knights to a record of 18-7-4, a SUNYAC Championship, the quarterfinals of the NCAA Division III Tournament, and a No. 7 ranking in the final Division III poll during his last season. Hills amassed a record of 53-42-14 while reviving the Geneseo hockey program. His record during his final two seasons at Geneseo was 32-14-9.

== Personal life ==
Hills lives in Honeoye Falls with his wife, Andrea. They have two children, a daughter, Alexandra, and a son, Trevor. Alexandra was a forward on the RIT women's hockey team that won the 2012 NCAA Division III National Championship. She also earned her bachelor's degree from the university. Trevor will begin his junior season on the hockey team at SUNY Geneseo in 2015-16.

== Head coaching record ==
Record table
Season	Team	Overall	Conference	Standing	Postseason
Geneseo State Ice Knights (SUNYAC) (2001–2005)
2001–02	Geneseo State	12–15–2	7–5–2	t-3rd	SUNYAC Semifinals
2002–03	Geneseo State	9–13–3	7–6–1	t-4th	SUNYAC First Round
2003–04	Geneseo State	14–7–5	8–4–2	4th	SUNYAC First Round
2004–05	Geneseo State	18–7–4	10–3–1	2nd	NCAA Quarterfinals
Geneseo State:		53–42–14	32–18–6		
Total:		53–42–14			
National champion Postseason invitational champion Conference regular season champion Conference regular season and conference tournament champion Division regular season champion Division regular season and conference tournament champion Conference tournament champion

== Awards and honours ==
Award	Year
All-CCHA Second Team	1980–81
All-CCHA First Team	1981–82
AHCA West All-American	1981–82
All-CCHA First Team	1982–83
AHCA West All-American	1982–83

Awards and achievements
Preceded by George McPhee	CCHA Player of the Year; 1982–83	Succeeded by Paul Pooley
Preceded by Ed Beers	NCAA Ice Hockey Scoring Champion; 1982–83	Succeeded by Paul Pooley
