= Bob Dobek =

American ice hockey player

- Born: October 4, 1952 (age 73) Detroit, Michigan, United States
- Height: 6 ft 0 in (183 cm)
- Weight: 185 lb (84 kg; 13 st 3 lb)
- Position: Center
- Shot: Left
- Played for: San Diego Mariners
- National team: United States
- Playing career: 1976–1977

Robert Andrew Dobek (born October 4, 1952, in Detroit, Michigan) is a retired professional ice hockey player who played 72 games in the World Hockey Association for the San Diego Mariners between 1976 and 1977 after starring for the US team in the 1976 Winter Olympics as well as the Bowling Green State University men's hockey team in the early 1970s.

== Career statistics ==
=== Regular season and playoffs ===
			Regular season					Playoffs
Season	Team	League	GP	G	A	Pts	PIM	GP	G	A	Pts	PIM
1970–71	Detroit Junior Red Wings	SOJHL	44	39	56	95	0	—	—	—	—	—
1971–72	Detroit Junior Red Wings	SOJHL	56	65	70	135	0	—	—	—	—	—
1972–73	Bowling Green State University	CCHA	34	29	34	63	22	—	—	—	—	—
1973–74	Bowling Green State University	CCHA	39	44	42	86	40	—	—	—	—	—
1974–75	Bowling Green State University	CCHA	35	21	58	79	44	—	—	—	—	—
1975–76	San Diego Mariners	WHA	14	3	1	4	2	11	1	2	3	0
1975–76	U.S. Olympic Team	Intl	64	47	63	110	62	—	—	—	—	—
1976–77	Charlotte Checkers	SHL	2	1	1	2	0	—	—	—	—	—
1976–77	San Diego Mariners	WHA	58	7	17	24	17	5	0	0	0	4
WHA totals			72	10	18	28	19	16	1	2	3	4

== Awards and honors ==
Award	Year
All-CCHA First Team	1973-74
All-CCHA First Team	1974-75
