= Bowling Green Falcons men's ice hockey =

Ice hockey team

- Current season
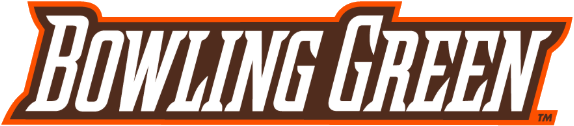
- University: Bowling Green State University
- Conference: CCHA
- First season: 1969–70; 57 years ago
- Head coach: Dennis Williams; 3rd season, 41–50–17 (.458)
- Arena: Slater Family Ice Arena; Bowling Green, Ohio
- Colors: Brown and orange

NCAA tournament champions
- 1984

NCAA tournament Frozen Four
- 1978, 1984

NCAA tournament appearances
- 1977, 1978, 1979, 1982, 1984, 1987, 1988, 1989, 1990, 2019

Conference tournament champions
- CCHA: 1973, 1977, 1978, 1979, 1988

Conference regular season champions
- MCHA: 1970, 1971; CCHA: 1976, 1978, 1979, 1982, 1983, 1984, 1987

Current uniform

The Bowling Green Falcons ice hockey team is the ice hockey team that represents Bowling Green State University in Bowling Green, Ohio. The school's team competes in the Central Collegiate Hockey Association. The Falcons last played in the NCAA Men's Division I Ice Hockey Tournament in 2019. The Falcons have won one NCAA Division I championship, coming in 1984, defeating the Minnesota-Duluth Bulldogs in the longest championship game in the tournament's history.

== History ==
=== Early history (1960–1973) ===
Ice hockey at Bowling Green has existed since the early 1960s in club form. It was not until the late 1960s that the university took interest in adding men's ice hockey to its list of varsity sports. Jack Vivian took over the program in the 1966. and in the University opened the BGSU Ice Arena in 1967 and Vivian guided the program into the NCAA in 1969. The team joined the Midwest Collegiate Hockey Association (MCHA) for the 1969–70 season and in its first season in the conference, the Falcons finished 1st in the regular season with a record of 13–12–5.

The team continued that initial success into the 1970–71 season. BG again took first place in the MCHA regular season with a record of 18–12–1. Vivian was a key figure in creating the Central Collegiate Hockey Association (CCHA) and in 1971 Bowling Green joined as a charter member. In their first season in the CCHA Bowling Green finished with a record of 21–10–2. BG lost to Saint Louis University 5–6 in overtime in the CCHA Semifinal game and beat Ohio University 6–5 in OT in the Third Place Game.

Despite a sub .500 record in the 1972–73 season the Falcons won 6–5 in overtime over St. Louis in a rematch of the 1972 Semifinal game and beat Ohio State 8–1 to win BGSU's first CCHA Tournament Championship and Jack Vivian's first and only CCHA Championship. Following the 1972–73 season Vivian left to become the General Manager and coach of the Cleveland Crusaders (WHA).

=== Rise to a national powerhouse (1973–1990) ===
Ron Mason took over as head coach of the Falcons for the 1973–74 season after coaching from 1966 to 1973 at Lake Superior State where he led the Lakers five NAIA Tournament appearances, three straight runner-up spots from 1968–70 and an NAIA Championship in 1972.

With Mason behind the bench BG won their second CCHA Tournament Championship with a 5–4 victory over St. Louis University. The win gave the Falcons their first bid to the NCAA Division I Men's Ice Hockey Tournament in 1977. Bowling Green State lost in their first NCAA tournament appearance in a high scoring game, 7–5 to Michigan.

BG continued where they left off the season before and claimed another CCHA Regular Season Championship. The Falcons picked up wins over Ohio State and Saint Louis University to win the CCHA Playoff Championship. This gave Bowling Green their second ever and second straight NCAA tournament appearance. BG won 5–3 over Colorado College for the program's first NCAA post season win. With the win over CC BG advanced to the Frozen Four for the first time. Bowling Green fell to Boston College 6–2. The Falcons came back in the Third Place Game with a 4–3 win over the Wisconsin Badgers. The following season, in 1978–79, Bowling Green again claimed first place in the CCHA regular season and CCHA playoffs after wins from Lake Superior State and Ohio State. BG advanced to the third consecutive NCAA tournament in 1979 under Mason. Their season was ended by Minnesota 6–3. Bowling Green finished the 1978–79 season with a record of 37–6–2, to date, the most wins in school history and then an NCAA record 37 wins.

The 1979–80 season saw the second coaching change in the program's history after Mason left to coach Michigan State. Bowling Green hired Jerry York, formerly head coach of the Clarkson Golden Knights since 1972.

The Falcons continued their winning ways and BGSU won the CCHA Regular Season Championship the third season with York as head coach. After a 8–5 loss in the CCHA semi-final game to Notre Dame BG took third place in the CCHA playoffs after a 2–1 win over Michigan Tech. Bowling Green received an at-large bid to the 1982 NCAA tournament but lost 5–4 in OT to Northeastern.

The 1983–84 season was one of the most historic seasons in Bowling Green Hockey history. BGSU finished first place in the CCHA regular season for the third straight season but fell in the CCHA Playoffs in the CCHA Semifinals, 4–3 in the second overtime to Western Michigan. Despite the loss, Bowling Green received an at-large bid to the 1984 NCAA tournament. The Falcons won the opening round series in overtime to Boston University The Falcons then won 2–1 over Michigan State in the Frozen Four. The win over the Spartans set up a Championship game in the Herb Brooks Arena located in Lake Placid, New York, site of the Miracle on Ice during the 1980 Winter Olympics, against Minnesota–Duluth. The game was tied at 4 after regulation and went into overtime. Bowling Green won in the fourth overtime from a goal by Gino Cavallini 7:11 into the fourth overtime, also at the 97:11 mark of total game time, it stands today as one of the longest games in Division I hockey history and the longest NCAA D1 Men's Ice Hockey Championship Game.

The Falcons finished high in the CCHA standings during the following season, including first place in the regular season during the 1986–87 season and a CCHA Playoff Championship in the 1987–88 season. The team qualified for the NCAA tournament four straight seasons from 1987–1990, a program high for consecutive appearances.

=== Falling into the shadows (1991–2008) ===
BG failed to qualify for the NCAA post season from 1991–94 and finished with a winning record only once, with a record of 19–17–2 (.526 pct.) in 1993–94. Following the 1993–94 season York accepted a head coaching position at his alma mater Boston College. Buddy Powers was appointed the head coach at Bowling Green on July 12, 1994, becoming the fourth head coach in the program's history. He had previously served as the head coach at the Rochester Institute of Technology (DIII) and Rensselaer Polytechnic Institute. Powers had also served as an assistant coach, chief recruiter, and on-ice instructor for BGSU under York from 1982 to 1988. During the time the Falcons had a record of 174–74–8 (.695 pct.), including 129–50–8 (.710 pct.) in league play and finished either first or second in the CCHA on five occasions.

Powers lead the Falcons to a 25–11–2 record and a second-place finish in the CCHA during the 1994–95 campaign. It marked their best finish in the league in eight years. He was named the CCHA's Coach of the Year and was a finalist for the Spencer Penrose Award presented annually to the nation's top head coach. Also that year, Brian Holzinger was named CCHA player of the Year. Holzinger won the NCAA All-American Award in ice hockey along with Kelly Perrault. Holzinger became BGSU's second Hobey Baker Award winner, the other being George McPhee in 1982 during Powers' first season as BGSU's assistant coach.

Although the first half of his time as BGSU's head coach was strong, the lack of top players coming to BGSU affected his overall record; Powers finished with losing records in his last five seasons. Over eight seasons as BGSU's head coach, Powers has compiled a 135–149–26 record at Bowling Green. Powers left in 2002 and eventually became the ice arena director at BG until taking an assistant coaching position in 2009 with his alma mater, Boston University.

Scott Paluch became the fifth coach in program history starting in the 2002–03 season. The change of coaching staff did not yield any better results as the trend of sub-.500 seasons continued. Paluch's best season came in 2007–08 when he led the Falcons to their first CCHA post season win in seven years during the 2007–08 season when the Falcons picked up a 4–3 win over Lake Superior State on March 7, 2008. The game marked the first CCHA playoff win since 2001 Bowling Green defeated Northern Michigan 2–1 in overtime. The win over Lake Superior in 2008 also marked the first playoff win at home since 1995 against Notre Dame. CCHA Quarterfinal round in the 2007–08 season. Lake Superior rebounded the next night with a 6–1 win to tie the best-of-three series at 1 game each. Bowling Green finished the Lakers off in the third game after being down 1–3 early in the second period. The Falcons push with a second period goal by Derek Whitmore and a late goal by Todd McIlrath to tie the game with three minutes left in the third period by was capped off 1:34 into overtime when Freshman Jacob Cepis found the back of the LSSU net.

Bowling Green would fall in their first CCHA quarterfinal match up since 2001 at Miami two games to none. The RedHawks would go on to the 2008 NCAA tournament, losing in the Quarterfinals to the eventual National Champion, Boston College.

=== Possible end (2008–2010) ===
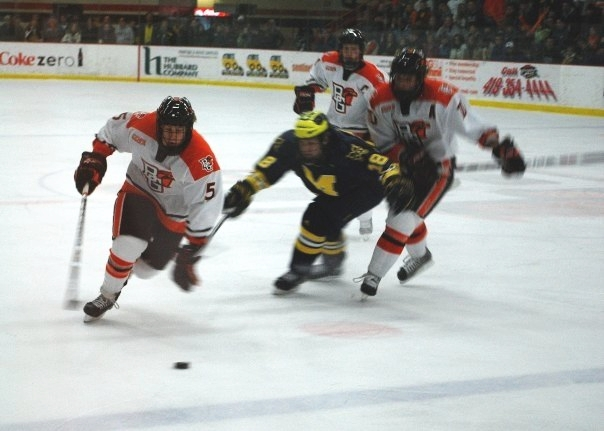
BGSU vs. Michigan (Jan. 2009)

By late 2008 and early 2009, after years of low rankings in the CCHA and NCAA, lack of post season success, an aging arena desperate for renovations and the program's lack of top players, rumors that the university was investigating canceling hockey as a varsity sport in efforts to cut budget losses were confirmed to be among a number of options. The news shocked both the BGSU and college hockey communities. College hockey had already been hit by a number of folding varsity hockey programs in the previous decade, including nearby Findlay. But unlike some of the smaller programs to be discontinued, Bowling Green was close to becoming the first NCAA Championship-winning hockey program to be eliminated.

The Falcons were without a winning season since 1996–97, and had had only one .500 season during that stretch. Soon after the rumors began, program alumni, Falcon hockey fans in the form of university alumni and current students, BGSU figure skating alumni and various other users of the BGSU Ice Arena began grassroots efforts to save the program. A program, that eventually transformed with the university's help into the Bring Back the Glory Campaign, began to raise money for ice arena renovations, hockey scholarship endowments and other funds. Leaders of the Campaign included notable alumni Rob Blake, Garry Galley, Alissa Czisny, Scott Hamilton, Tom Blakely, Steve Green, and the programs first head coach Jack Vivian, among others.

Following the conclusion of the 2008–2009 season, BGSU head coach Scott Paluch resigned. Paluch posted a record of 84–156–23 (.363 pct.) in his seven seasons as head coach of the Falcons. His best season came in 2004–05 when the team finished with a .500 record of 16–16–4. Dennis Williams, previously a head coach at Neumann College (DIII) and assistant coach at BG for the 2008–2009 season took over as interim head coach. Although Williams posted a record of 5–25–6 in his only season behind the bench, the 2009–10 season was a success in a number of areas. The future of the program was secured with the help of the university and Bring Back the Glory campaign and Williams stopped the outflow of players and recruits after news of the possible end of the program.

=== Bring Back the Glory (2010–2018) ===
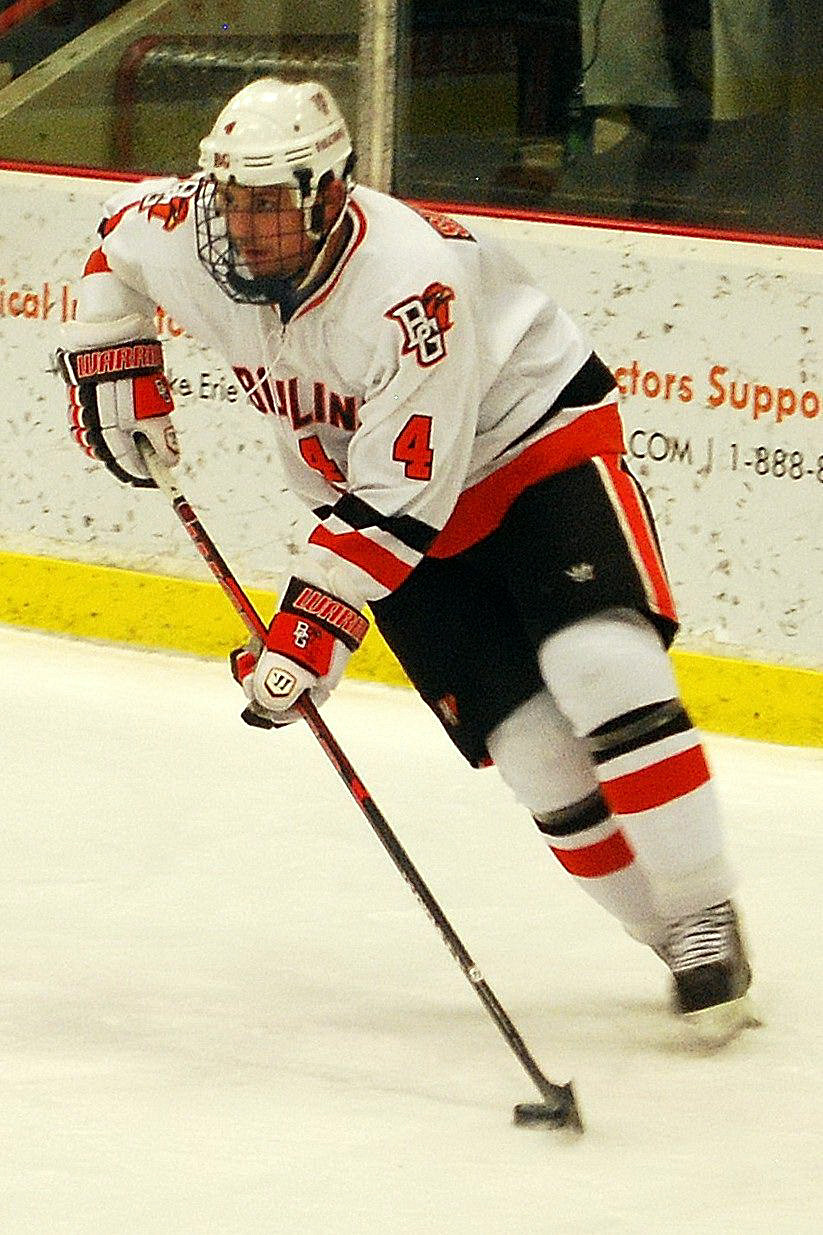
BG ice hockey player Mike Sullivan in 2011.

The rapid success of the Bring Back the Glory campaign to establish an endowment and raise necessary funds to secure the program's future was seen when the BGSU Ice Arena began a $4 million renovation to upgrade the compressors, chillers, build new locker rooms, add an additional multipurpose ice sheet, and infrastructure and lighting upgrades.

Chris Bergeron was hired as head coach beginning in the 2010–11 season, along with Barry Schutte and Ty Eigner. Bergeron came to Bowling Green after serving as assistant coach and recruiting coordinator at Miami University, where he helped head coach Enrico Blasi build the RedHawks program into a national powerhouse. Bergeron was brought in by the university to turn around the struggling program. After starting the season 0–3–0 losing two games to Michigan and one to Clarkson, Bergeron picked up his first win as a college head coach in the second game of the road series against Clarkson on October 16, 2010. The Falcons finished the regular season 11th in the CCHA with a record of 8–24–4. The Falcons then upset Northern Michigan in the first round of the CCHA Tournament winning the best-of-three series when freshman Bryce Williamson scored the 34 seconds into the second overtime. The 2–1 win sent the Falcons to the CCHA quarterfinals for the first time since the 2007–08 season where the Falcons were matched up against top-seeded Michigan. The Wolverines ended the season for Bowling Green by sweeping the Falcons in the best-of-three series 1–5 and 1–4.

In August 2011, the Western Collegiate Hockey Association (WCHA) announced it extended invitations to five CCHA members, after eight of the WCHA's members announced they were leaving for the Big Ten Conference and National Collegiate Hockey Conference in 2013. BGSU gained an extension of the invitation while the athletic department investigated other opportunities. On October 4, 2011, the university announced its intentions to leave the CCHA in 2013 and join the WCHA beginning In 2013–14. The move will allow the falcons to maintain existing rivalries with Alaska-Fairbanks, Ferris State, Lake Superior State and Northern Michigan, all of which announced acceptations of the WCHA invite prior to Bowling Green's announcement.

The Falcons finished the 2011–12 regular season with an overall record of 10–21–5 and a conference record of 5 wins, 19 losses, 4 overtime games and three shootout wins; the record positioned the team in last place in the conference. In the first round of the 2012 CCHA Tournament BGSU was set to play Northern Michigan. In a rematch of the prior season's tournament, Bowling Green again upset the six-seeded Wildcats three games to two. In the second round, Bowling Green played top-seeded Ferris State, also ranked second in the national poll. The Falcons won the first game of the three-game series in overtime, followed by the Bulldogs winning the second game to force a third game. In the third game of the series, Ferris State recorded three goals in the first period before Bowling Green rallied to score four unanswered goals, the final goal in overtime. Bowling Green advanced to the CCHA Semifinal round at Joe Louis Arena in Detroit for the first time since the 2001 season with the win over Ferris State. The season ended in the CCHA Semifinal game when Michigan rallied from a two-goal deficit and tied the game with 2:45 left in regulation to force overtime. The tie was not broken until Michigan's Luke Moffatt scored at the 1:04 mark of the second overtime to give the Wolverines a 3–2 win. BGSU goaltender Andrew Hammond finished the game with 55 saves that came within one save of the school record is 56 saves set by Jordan Sigalet in 2003. The team lost the third place 4–1 to Miami (OH) game and finished fourth in the CCHA Playoffs. Bowling Green finished the season with an overall record of 14–25–5.

The team recently held ceremonies in the 2014 season to commemorate the 30th anniversary of the National Championship Team. Also the Falcons will be playing in an outdoor game against Robert Morris University at Fifth Third Field.

On November 17, 2014, the Falcons appeared in the USCHO.com Division I Men's Poll at number 19 for the first time since the 2007–2008 season. The Falcons have moved up in the rankings in subsequent weeks, reaching 18th, 15th and 14th, in consecutive weeks.

In 2017–18, the Bowling Green Falcons won the Great Lakes Invitational Tournament, the first in Detroit's Little Caesar's Arena. They defeated the Michigan Wolverines 6–4 in the semifinals, and they defeated the Michigan Tech Huskies 4–1 in the championship game the following day.

=== The Glory Is Back (2018–2021) ===
In 2018–19, Bowling Green had a hot stretch to start the season, highlighted by an 8–2 victory over a top-10 Ohio State team in Columbus and culminating in finishing the first half of the season with a sweep of then-#3 Minnesota State to go into the Christmas break with a 13–3–3 record. Despite their struggles with consistency down the stretch to close the regular season, the Falcons swept their way through the first 2 rounds of the playoffs, defeating Michigan Tech 3–2, 6–2 at home and Northern Michigan 6–1, 2–1 on the road along the way en route to a WCHA Championship game in Mankato, MN on March 23, 2019, where the Falcons fell to Minnesota State in overtime, 3–2. Despite the loss, they had officially done what no Bowling Green team had done since 1990 – earn a bid to the NCAA tournament. They were selected as the 15th seed, which was the last at-large bid to make it into the tournament. This was a monumental occasion, drawing a crowd of Falcon fans to a "watch party" for the selection show inside the Slater Family Ice Arena as Bowling Green heard their name called for the first time in 29 years that night. In addition to the selection show, that day was also the 35th anniversary of the 1984 NCAA Championship, which saw the Falcons earn a 5–4 victory in four overtimes over the Minnesota-Duluth Bulldogs, who would coincidentally end up being their first round opponent in the Midwest Regional out of Allentown, PA in the 2019 tournament. Unfortunately for the Falcons, they would drop the contest 2–1 in overtime, and their season would come to a close with a record of 25–11–5 for the year, their most wins in a single season since they earned 26 victories during the 1995–96 campaign. On April 5, 2019, it was announced that Chris Bergeron would be leaving to assume the head coaching job at Miami University, his alma mater. He left Bowling Green as the 2nd-winningest head coach in school history, with 171 wins.

On April 20, 2019, after a 15-day search, Ty Eigner was hired as the 8th head coach in Bowling Green hockey history. A Bowling Green alumnus and former captain for the BGSU hockey team, Eigner was hired after spending the previous 9 seasons as an assistant coach. In his time as an assistant, BGSU amassed a total overall record of 171–154–44, winning 20+ games in his final 5 seasons as an assistant and making the NCAA tournament for the first time in 29 years. On the day Eigner was hired, Boston College head coach and former BGSU head coach Jerry York discussed the move, saying, "The first thing I remember about coaching Ty was how well-respected he was in our locker room – an outstanding teammate. His progression and growth in coaching has been very impressive from my viewpoint. He is an excellent hire to lead the Falcons!"

On June 28, 2019, it was announced that Bowling Green would leave the WCHA following the 2020–21 season, along with 6 other league schools to re-form the CCHA, the Falcons' previous conference, which had been dormant since the 2012–13 NCAA Hockey season. To begin the 2019–20 season, Eigner's Falcons traveled to take on Bergeron's Redhawks in their respective coaching debuts at each school, with Bowling Green taking the win, 7–4. In November 2019, BGSU split with then-#2 Minnesota State and swept then-#5 Notre Dame to win three times against top-5 opponents in a span of one month. It was a signal to many fans that the program would be just fine under Eigner. Bowling Green followed the Notre Dame sweep with a colossal offensive performance, scoring 9 goals in a 23 minute span to defeat the Alabama-Huntsville Chargers, 9–3. The Falcons won a first round series on the road in Fairbanks, Alaska in March 2020, sweeping the Nanooks 4–2, 3–2. On the Thursday before their semifinal series against Bemidji State, the WCHA and NCAA announced that the rest of the season was canceled due to the COVID-19 outbreak, ending Eigner's first season in charge with an overall record of 21–13–4. After having a difficult and oftentimes frustrating January, the Falcons finished the season as one of the hottest team in the country, with a 10-game unbeaten streak (8–0–2), longest in the nation. That year, Eigner coached defenseman Alec Rauhauser to a 2nd-team All-American (West) finish and a WCHA Defensive Player of the Year Award, adding to his successful track record of developing tremendous defensive hockey players. Also in 2019–2020, with the help of assistant coach Maco Balkovec, the re-designed Falcon powerplay unit scored the most goals on the man advantage in Division I hockey.

In 2020–21, in the final year of the WCHA and a season shortened due to the COVID-19 pandemic, Bowling Green started the season on a scorching pace, winning 12 of their first 13 games and finding themselves at 16–4–0 through 20 games. Unfortunately, the hot start did not last, and the Falcons went 4–6–1 down the stretch, including their first quarterfinal playoff series loss since joining the WCHA in 2013, losing to Northern Michigan in three games. Still, with their 20–10–1 record, there was a thought that they may still have a chance at an at-large bid to the NCAA tournament, being one of the five programs in the country to win 20+ games on the season. However, those dreams were dashed on Selection Sunday, when the Falcons were left out for a 14–13–2 Notre Dame team from the Big Ten.

Still, 2020–21 had some great moments, as Bowling Green won the program's 1,000th game in program history on January 16, 2021. In addition, three of Eigner’s Falcons were named as First Team All-WCHA performers, in seniors Brandon Kruse and Connor Ford, and junior Will Cullen, who also claimed Bowling Green’s third WCHA Defensive Player of the Year award in four seasons.

=== Return to the CCHA and Williams Comes Home (2021-Present) ===
Beginning with the 2021-2022 season, the Central Collegiate Hockey Association returned after an 8 year absence, and that was where Bowling Green and a handful of other former WCHA schools chose to compete moving forward. This is also the time that the program took a bit of a downturn, as the Falcons went 15-19-3, 15-19-2, and 13-22-1 in their first 3 seasons in the conference, which would be Eigner's last 3 seasons as head coach.

After a 16-day search, on March 27, 2024, Bowling Green officially announced the hire of alumnus and former interim head coach Dennis Williams, who would return to lead the program through a building phase. As he had a World Juniors medal as the head coach of the Canadian national team and plenty of experience coaching in the WHL, as well as Bowling Green's athletic director Derek van der Merwe having the foresight to know that major juniors players would soon be eligible for NCAA competition, most in Bowling Green felt that it was a huge, program-changing hire.

In Williams' first season in charge, Bowling Green improved to 18-14-4, including sweeping a home CCHA playoff series against rival Michigan Tech, who had swept them in the playoffs and gone on to win the Mason Cup a year earlier.

== Coaches ==
As of the end of the 2025–26 season. Records includes regular season and playoffs games.

Tenure	Coach	Years	Record	Pct.
1969–1973	Jack Vivian	4	68–53–8	.558
1973–1979	Ron Mason	6	160–63–6	.712
1979–1994	Jerry York	15	342–248–31	.576
1994–2002	Buddy Powers	8	135–149–26	.477
2002–2009	Scott Paluch	7	84–156–23	.363
2010–2019	Chris Bergeron	9	171–154–44	.523
2019–2024	Ty Eigner	5	84–83–11	.503
2009–2010, 2024–present	Dennis Williams	3	41–50–17	.458
Totals	8 coaches	57 seasons	1,085–954–166	.530

== Statistical leaders ==
=== Career points leaders ===
Player	Years	GP	G	A	Pts	PIM
Nelson Emerson	1986–1990	178	112	182	294	170
Brian Hills	1979–1983	156	116	154	270	143
George McPhee	1978–1982	153	114	153	267	234
Greg Parks	1985–1989	178	101	139	240	279
Jamie Wansbrough	1982–1986	164	127	110	237	96
John Markell	1975–1979	150	102	133	235	249
Mark Wells	1975–1979	154	77	154	231	93
Bob Dobek	1972–1975	108	94	134	228	106
Mike Bartley	1970–1974	138	118	104	222	96
Paul Ysebaert	1984–1987	129	73	135	208	148
Brett Harkins	1989–1993	150	60	148	208	135

=== Career goaltending leaders ===
GP = Games played; Min = Minutes played; W = Wins; L = Losses; T = Ties; GA = Goals against; SO = Shutouts; SV% = Save percentage; GAA = Goals against average

Minimum 1000 minutes

Player	Years	GP	Min	W	L	T	GA	SO	SV%	GAA
Ryan Bednard	2016–2019	68	3998	39	19	8	135	7	.918	2.06
Chris Nell	2014–2017	84	4987	41	29	10	172	11	.922	2.07
Eric Dop	2017–2021	80	4705	45	26	7	174	8	.914	2.22
Tommy Burke	2012–2016	73	4270	37	22	11	172	3	.909	2.42
Brian Stankiewicz	1977–1979	35	1978	27	6	0	82	2	.909	2.49

Statistics current through the end of the 2023–24 season.

== Players and personnel ==
=== Current roster ===
As of February 28, 2026.

No.	Nat.	Player	Class	Pos	Height	Weight	DoB	Hometown	Previous team	NHL rights
1	(Canada)	Jacob Steinman	Freshman	G	6' 0" (1.83 m)	185 lb (84 kg)	2004-05-23	Cambridge, Ontario	Halifax Mooseheads (QMJHL)	—
3	(Canada)	Ty Higgins	Freshman	D	6' 0" (1.83 m)	188 lb (85 kg)	2004-09-26	Stratford, Ontario	Rouyn-Noranda Huskies (QMJHL)	—
4	(United States)	Brian Lonergan	Freshman	D	5' 11" (1.8 m)	173 lb (78 kg)	2005-12-28	Montvale, New Jersey	Omaha Lancers (USHL)	—
5	(Sweden)	Gustav Stjernberg (A)	Junior	D	6' 4" (1.93 m)	213 lb (97 kg)	2002-10-12	Enebyberg, Sweden	Des Moines Buccaneers (USHL)	—
7	(Latvia)	Rihards Simanovičs	Junior	D	6' 3" (1.91 m)	200 lb (91 kg)	2003-10-07	Riga, Latvia	Miami (NCHC)	—
8	(Canada)	Jérémie Minville	Freshman	F	6' 0" (1.83 m)	190 lb (86 kg)	2004-04-08	Drummondville, Quebec	Gatineau Olympiques (QMJHL)	—
10	(Slovakia)	Adam Žlnka	Sophomore	F	6' 0" (1.83 m)	178 lb (81 kg)	2004-02-28	Detva, Slovakia	Des Moines Buccaneers (USHL)	UTA, 204th overall 2022
11	(Canada)	Noah Morneau	Freshman	F	6' 0" (1.83 m)	183 lb (83 kg)	2004-05-07	Riverside, Ontario	Windsor Spitfires (OHL)	—
12	(United States)	Jackson Niedermayer	Senior	F	6' 0" (1.83 m)	200 lb (91 kg)	2001-03-11	Newport Beach, California	Arizona State (NCAA)	—
13	(Canada)	Brett Pfoh	Senior	F	5' 11" (1.8 m)	187 lb (85 kg)	2002-01-22	Port Moody, British Columbia	Spruce Grove Saints (AJHL)	—
14	(United States)	Dalton Norris (C)	Senior	D	5' 10" (1.78 m)	186 lb (84 kg)	2001-09-28	Oxford, Michigan	Lincoln Stars (USHL)	—
15	(United States)	Max Martin	Sophomore	F	6' 0" (1.83 m)	195 lb (88 kg)	2003-10-02	Tawas City, Michigan	Wisconsin Windigo (NAHL)	—
16	(Canada)	Jake Sloan	Freshman	F	6' 4" (1.93 m)	223 lb (101 kg)	2004-02-13	Leduc County, Alberta	Tri-City Americans (WHL)	—
17	(Canada)	Breck McKinley	Junior	D	5' 9" (1.75 m)	175 lb (79 kg)	2003-10-08	St. Albert, Alberta	Spruce Grove Saints (AJHL)	—
18	(United States)	Quinn Emerson	Senior	F	5' 11" (1.8 m)	186 lb (84 kg)	2001-03-12	Manhattan Beach, California	Wenatchee Wild (BCHL)	—
20	(Canada)	Connor Levis	Freshman	F	6' 2" (1.88 m)	188 lb (85 kg)	2004-10-05	Vancouver, British Columbia	Vancouver Giants (WHL)	WPG, 210th overall 2023
21	(Ukraine)	Ivan Korodiuk	Sophomore	D	6' 4" (1.93 m)	200 lb (91 kg)	2004-01-05	Kyiv, Ukraine	Madison Capitols (USHL)	—
22	(Canada)	Tanner Scott	Freshman	F	5' 9" (1.75 m)	167 lb (76 kg)	2004-05-31	Sherwood Park, Alberta	Saskatoon Blades (WHL)	—
23	(United States)	Ben Doran	Junior	F	5' 11" (1.8 m)	181 lb (82 kg)	2003-02-27	Chesterfield, Missouri	Sioux City Musketeers (USHL)	—
24	(Canada)	Tyler Hotson	Junior	F	6' 0" (1.83 m)	186 lb (84 kg)	2003-03-17	Stratford, Ontario	Rensselaer (ECAC)	—
25	(Canada)	Brayden Crampton	Freshman	D	6' 1" (1.85 m)	177 lb (80 kg)	2004-05-02	Chilliwack, British Columbia	Spokane Chiefs (WHL)	—
26	(United States)	Jack Blake	Senior	D	6' 2" (1.88 m)	189 lb (86 kg)	2001-09-21	Manhattan Beach, California	Oakville Blades (OJHL)	—
27	(Canada)	Brandon Whynott	Freshman	F	6' 2" (1.88 m)	198 lb (90 kg)	2004-04-16	Langley, British Columbia	Tri-City Americans (WHL)	—
28	(United States)	Jaden Grant (A)	Senior	F	6' 2" (1.88 m)	195 lb (88 kg)	2002-09-02	White Lake, Michigan	Youngstown Phantoms (USHL)	—
29	(Canada)	Brody Waters	Junior	F	6' 3" (1.91 m)	207 lb (94 kg)	2002-04-09	Heidelberg, Ontario	Nanaimo Clippers (BCHL)	—
31	(Canada)	Tyler Palmer	Sophomore	G	6' 0" (1.83 m)	194 lb (88 kg)	2003-06-27	Fernie, British Columbia	Alberta (CWUAA)	—
34	(Canada)	Cole Moore	Junior	G	6' 6" (1.98 m)	214 lb (97 kg)	2003-06-04	Toronto, Ontario	Aberdeen Wings (NAHL)	—
77	(Czech Republic)	Dominik Rymon	Freshman	F	5' 10" (1.78 m)	160 lb (73 kg)	2004-05-29	Karlovy Vary, Czech Republic	Everett Silvertips (WHL)	—

== Falcons in the NHL ==
As of July 1, 2025.

= NHL All-Star team	= NHL All-Star	= NHL All-Star and NHL All-Star team	= Hall of Famers

Player	Position	Team(s)	Years	Games	Stanley Cups
Don Barber	Right Wing	MNS, WPG, QUE, SJS	1988–1992	115	0
Kevin Bieksa	Defenseman	VAN, ANA	2005–2018	808	0
Rob Blake	Defenseman	LAK, COL, SJS	1989–2010	1,270	1
Aris Brimanis	Defenseman	PHI, NYI, ANA, STL	1993–2004	113	0
Dan Bylsma	Right Wing	LAK, ANA	1995–2004	429	1†
Ryan Carpenter	Center	SJS, VGK, CHI, CGY, NYR	2015–2024	392	0
Gino Cavallini	Left Wing	CGY, STL, QUE	1984–1993	593	0
Kevin Dahl	Defenseman	CGY, PHO, TOR, CBJ	1992–2001	188	0
Greg De Vries	Defenseman	EDM, NSH, COL, NYR, OTT, ATL	1995–2009	878	1
Iain Duncan	Left Wing	WPG	1986–1991	127	0
David Ellett	Defenseman	WPG, TOR, NJD, BOS, STL	1984–2000	1,129	0
Nelson Emerson	Right Wing	STL, WPG, HFD, CAR, CHI, OTT, ATL, LAK	1990–2002	771	0
Todd Flichel	Defenseman	WPG	1987–1990	6	0
Alex Foster	Center	TOR	2007–2008	3	0
Mark Friedman	Defenseman	PHI, PIT, VAN	2018–Present	93	0
Garry Galley	Defenseman	LAK, WSH, BOS, PHI, BUF, NYI	1984–2001	1,149	0
Andrew Hammond	Goaltender	OTT, COL, MTL, NJD	2013–2022	67	0
Brett Harkins	Left Wing	BOS, FLA, CBJ	1994–2002	78	0
Brian Holzinger	Center	BUF, TBL, PIT, CBJ	1994–2004	547	0
Mike Johnson	Left Wing	TOR, PHO, MTL, STL	1996–2008	661	0
Ken Klee	Defenseman	WSH, TOR, NJD, COL, ATL, ANA, PHO	1992–1995	934	0

Player	Position	Team(s)	Years	Games	Stanley Cups
Mike Liut	Goaltender	STL, HFD, WSH	1979–1992	663	0
Brian MacLellan	Forward	LAK, NYR, MNS, CGY, DET	1982–1992	606	0
John Markell	Defenseman	WPG, STL, MNS	1979–1985	55	0
Jon Matsumoto	Center	CAR, FLA	2010–2012	14	0
George McPhee	Forward	NYR, NJD	1982–1989	115	0
Ken Morrow	Defenseman	NYI	1979–1989	550	4
Mike Natyshak	Forward	QUE	1987–1988	4	0
Greg Parks	Right Wing	NYI	1990–1993	23	0
Marc Potvin	Right Wing	DET, LAK, HFD, BOS	1990–1996	121	0
Sean Pronger	Center	ANA, PIT, NYR, LAK, BOS, CBJ, VAN	1995–2004	260	0
Peter Ratchuk	Defenseman	FLA	1998–2001	32	0
Keith Redmond	Left Wing	FLA	1993–1994	12	0
Todd Reirden	Defenseman	EDM, ATL, ATL, PHO	1998–2004	183	0
Dan Sexton	Right Wing	ANA	2009–2011	88	0
Jonathan Sigalet	Defenseman	BOS	2006–2007	1	0
Jordan Sigalet	Goaltender	BOS	2005–2006	1	0
John Stewart	Center	QUE	1979–1980	2	0
Sean Walker	Defenseman	LAK, PHI, COL, CAR	2018–Present	395	1
Derek Whitmore	Forward	BUF	2011–2012	2	0
Paul Ysebaert	Defenseman	NJD, DET, WPG, CHI, TBL	1988–1999	532	0

†Dan Bylsma won a Stanley Cup as head coach for the Pittsburgh Penguins

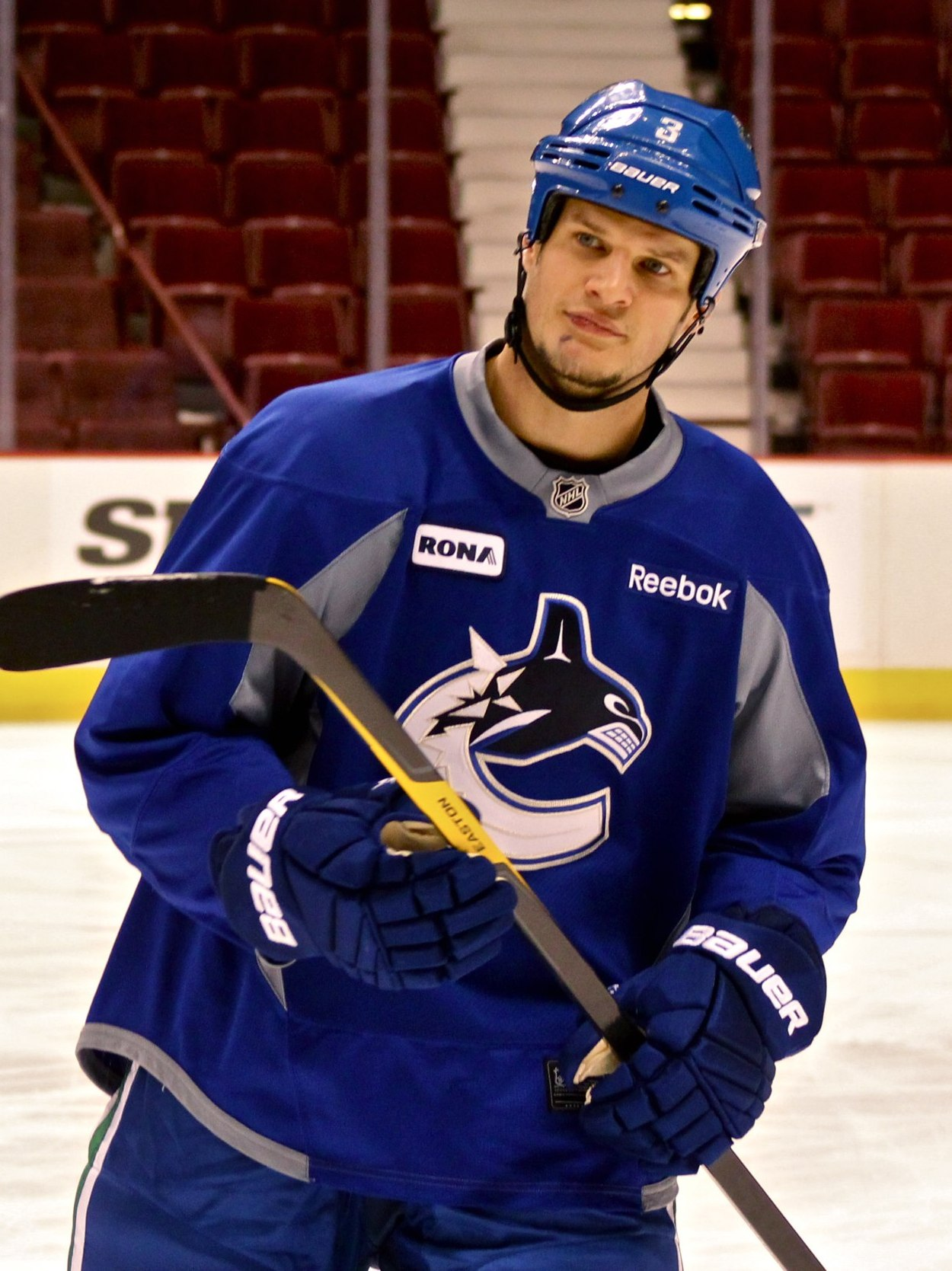
Kevin Bieksa

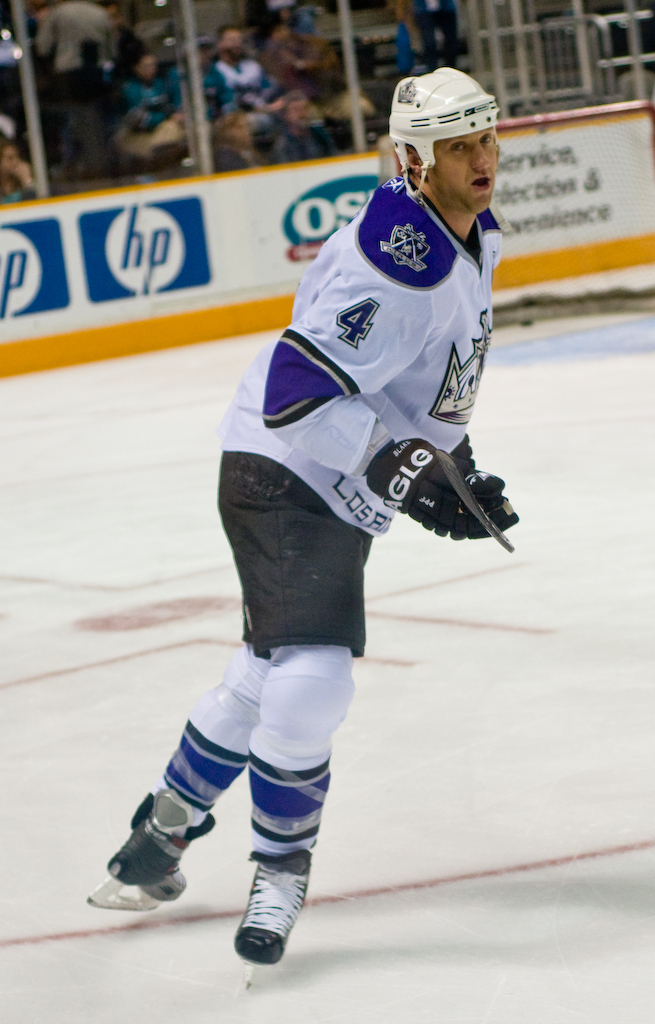
Rob Blake

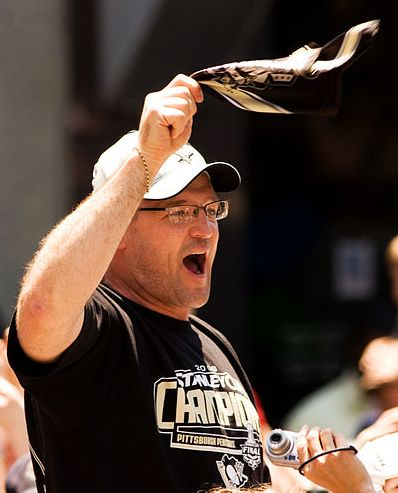
Dan Bylsma

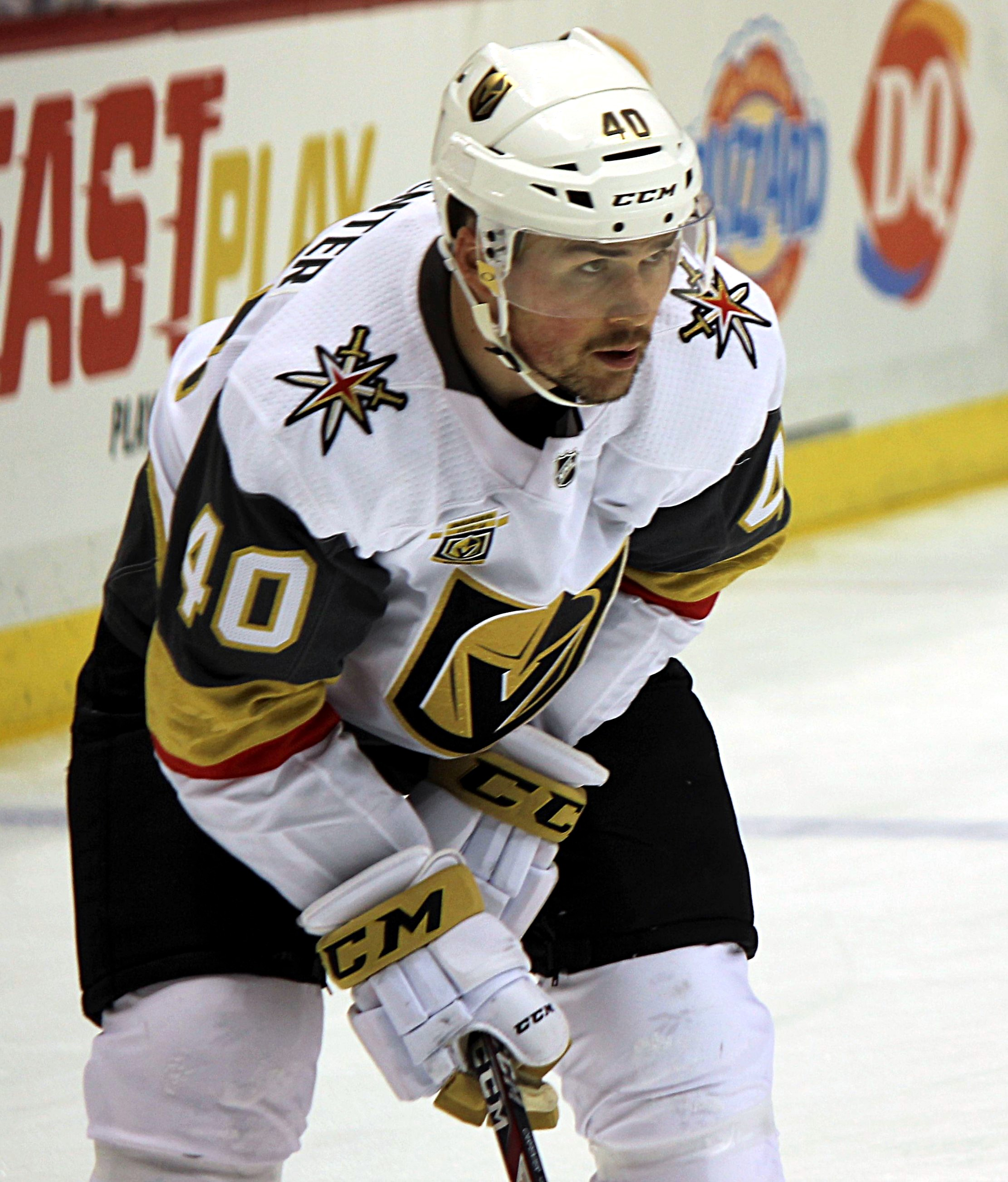
Ryan Carpenter

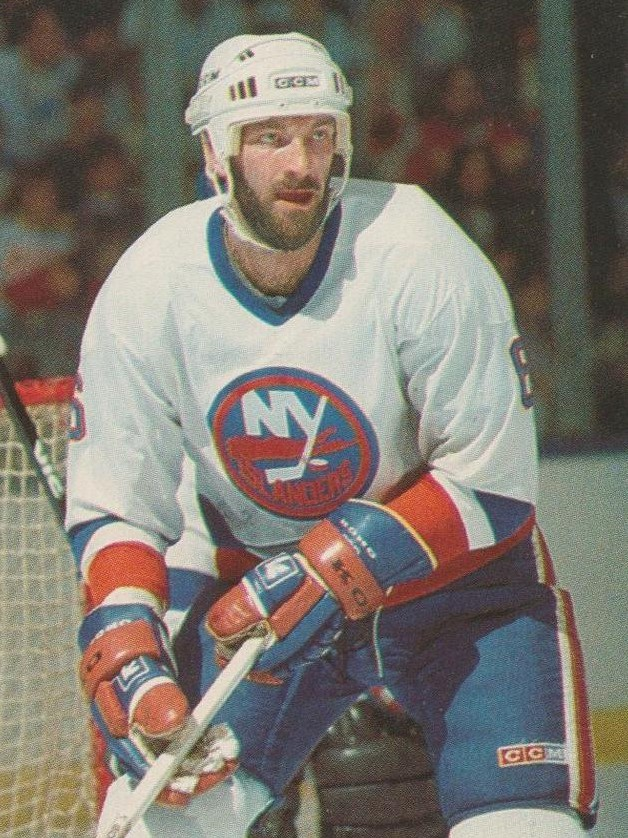
Ken Morrow

== Olympians ==
This is a list of Bowling Green alumni were a part of an Olympic team.

Name	Position	Bowling Green Tenure	Team	Year	Finish
Bob Dobek	Center	1972–1975	United States	1976	5th
Doug Ross	Right Wing	1973–1975	United States	1976	5th
Ken Morrow	Defenseman	1975–1979	United States	1980	Gold
Mark Wells	Center	1975–1979	United States	1980	Gold
Brian Stankiewicz	Goaltender	1977–1979	Austria	1988, 1994	9th, 12th
Kevin Dahl	Defenseman	1986–1990	Canada	1992	Silver
Greg Parks	Right Wing	1985–1989	Canada	1994	Silver
Pierrick Maïa	Left Wing	1987–1991	France	1994	10th
Rob Blake	Defenseman	1987–1990	Canada	1998, 2002, 2006	4th, Gold, 7th
Ralfs Freibergs	Defenseman	2012–2014	Latvia	2014, 2026	8th, 10th

== Award winners ==
=== NCAA ===
==== Individual awards ====
Hobey Baker Award

- 1995: Brian Holzinger
- 1982: George McPhee

NCAA Scoring Champion

- 1983: Brian Hills

NCAA tournament MOP

- 1984: Gary Kruzich

==== All-Americans ====
First Team

- 1977-78: Ken Morrow, D
- 1981-82: Brian MacLellan, D; Brian Hills, F; George McPhee, F
- 1982-83: Brian Hills, F
- 1983-84: Garry Galley, D, Dan Kane, F
- 1985-86: Gary Kruzich, G
- 1986-87: Gary Kruzich, G
- 1987-88: Scott Paluch, D
- 1988-89: Greg Parks, F
- 1989-90: Rob Blake, D; Nelson Emerson, F
- 1994-95: Kelly Perrault, D; Brian Holzinger, F
- 2017-18: Alec Rauhauser
- 2019-20: Alec Rauhauser

First Team

- 1985-86: Jamie Wansbrough, F
- 1987-88: Nelson Emerson, F
- 1993-94: Jeff Wells, F
- 2017-18: Alec Rauhauser, D
- 2019-20: Alec Rauhauser, D

=== CCHA ===
==== Individual awards ====
Player of the Year

- Mike Liut: 1977
- John Markell: 1978
- Ken Morrow: 1979
- George McPhee: 1982
- Brian Hills: 1983
- Brian Holzinger: 1995

Rookie of the Year

- George McPhee: 1979
- Paul Ysebaert: 1985
- Nelson Emerson: 1987

Best Offensive Defenseman

- Rob Blake: 1990
- Kelly Perrault: 1995
- Mike Jones: 1999

Terry Flanagan Memorial Award

- Doug Schueller: 2001
- Jordan Sigalet: 2005

Perani Cup

- Jordan Sigalet: 2005

Coach of the Year

- Ron Mason: 1976, 1978, 1979
- Jerry York: 1982
- Buddy Powers: 1995

Tournament MVP

- Mike David: 1983
- Paul Connell: 1988

==== All-conference teams ====
First Team All-CCHA

- 1972–73: Roger Archer, D
- 1973–74: Roger Archer, D; Bob Dobek, F
- 1974–75: Mike Liut, G; Al Sarachman, G; Roger Archer, D; Bob Dobek, F; Doug Ross, F
- 1975–76: Al Sarachman, G; John Mavity, D; Ken Morrow, D
- 1976–77: Mike Liut, G; John Mavity, D; Mark Wells, F; John Markell, F
- 1977–78: Brian Stankiewicz, G; Ken Morrow, D; John Markell, F
- 1978–79: Wally Charko, G; Ken Morrow, D; John Markell, F; Mark Wells, F
- 1981–82: Brian MacLellan, D; George McPhee, F; Brian Hills, F
- 1982–83: Garry Galley, D; Brian Hills, F
- 1983–84: Garry Galley, D; Dan Kane, F
- 1985–86: Gary Kruzich, G; Jamie Wansbrough, F
- 1986–87: Gary Kruzich, G; Iain Duncan, F
- 1987–88: Scott Paluch, D; Nelson Emerson, F
- 1988–89: Greg Parks, F
- 1989–90: Rob Blake, D; Nelson Emerson, F
- 1993–94: Jeff Wells, F
- 1994–95: Kelly Perrault, D; Brian Holzinger, F
- 1998–99: Adam Edinger, F
- 2003–04: Jordan Sigalet, G
- 2022–23: Austen Swankler, F

Second Team All-CCHA

- 1972–73: Don Boyd, G; Chuck Gyles, D; Mike Bartley, F
- 1973–74: John Stewart, F
- 1974–75: Mike Hartman, F
- 1975–76: Mike Liut, G; Mike Hartman, F
- 1976–77: Ken Morrow, D
- 1977–78: Byron Shutt, F
- 1978–79: George McPhee, F
- 1979–80: John Gibb, D; Mike Cotter, D
- 1980–81: George McPhee, F; Brian Hills, F
- 1982–83: Dan Kane, F
- 1983–84: David Ellett, D; John Samanski, F
- 1984–85: Jamie Wansbrough, F
- 1985–86: Brian McKee, D; Paul Ysebaert, F
- 1986–87: Brian McKee, D; Paul Ysebaert, F
- 1988–89: Rob Blake, D; Nelson Emerson, F
- 1991–92: Peter Homles, F; Martin Jiranek, F
- 1992–93: Brian Holzinger, F
- 1995–96: Kelly Perrault, D
- 1998–99: Mike Jones, D; Dan Price, F
- 2004–05: Jordan Sigalet, G
- 2005–06: Alex Foster, F
- 2007–08: Derek Whitmore, F
- 2012–13: Bobby Shea, D; Ryan Carpenter, F
- 2022–23: Nathan Burke, F
- 2024–25: Ryan O'Hara, F; Brody Waters, F

All-CCHA Rookie Team

- 1989–90: Brett Harkins, F
- 1992–93: Aaron Ellis, G
- 1993–94: Bob Petrie, G; Curtis Fry, F
- 1996–97: Adam Edinger, F
- 2004–05: Mike Hodgson, D
- 2007–08: Nick Eno, G; Jacob Cepis, F
- 2021–22: Eric Parker, D; Austin Swankler, F
- 2022–23: Dalton Norris, D
- 2023–24: Cole Moore, G

=== WCHA ===
==== Individual awards ====
Defensive Player of the Year

- Alec Rauhauser: 2018, 2020
- Will Cullen: 2021

==== All-conference teams ====
First Team All-WCHA

- 2015–16: Chris Nell, G; Mark Friedman, D
- 2016–17: Mitchell McLain, F
- 2017–18: Alec Rauhauser, D
- 2019–20: Alec Rauhauser, D
- 2020–21: Will Cullen, D; Brandon Kruse, F; Connor Ford, F

Second Team All-WCHA

- 2015–16: Sean Walker, D
- 2016–17: Sean Walker, D
- 2017–18: Mitchell McLain, F
- 2018–19: Alec Rauhauser, D; Brandon Kruse, F

Third Team All-WCHA

- 2015–16: Mark Cooper, F
- 2016–17: Mark Friedman, D
- 2018–19: Ryan Bednard, G
- 2019–20: Connor Ford, F

All-WCHA Rookie Team

- 2014–15: Mark Friedman, D; Nolan Valleau, D; Brandon Hawkins, F
- 2016–17: Alec Rauhauser, D
- 2017–18: Eric Dop, G; Brandon Kruse, F; Max Johnson, F

== School records ==
=== Career ===
- Most goals in a career: Jamie Wansbrough, 127 (1982–86)
- Most assists in a career: Nelson Emerson, 182 (1986–90)
- Most points in a career: Nelson Emerson, 294 (1986–90)
- Most penalty minutes in a career: Matt Ruchty, 474 (1987–91)
- Most points in a career, defenseman: Scott Paluch, 169 (1984–88)
- Most wins in a career, Gary Kruzich, 88 (1983–87)
- Most shutouts in a career, Chris Nell, 11 (2014–17)

=== Season ===
Players

- Most goals in a season: Bob Dobek, 44 (1973–74)
- Most assists in a season: Bob Dobek/Paul Ysebaert, 58 (1974–75)/(1986–87)
- Most points in a season: Brian Hills, 94 (1982–83)
- Most points in a season, defenseman: Garry Galley, 67 (1983–84)
- Most wins in a season: Wally Charko, 32 (1978–79)
- Most shutouts in a season: Chris Nell, 4 (2016–17)
- Most power play goals in a season: Don Barber, 21 (1986–87)

Team

- Most wins in a season: 37 (1978–79)
- Most overtime games in a season: 11 (1991–92)/(2003–04)
- Longest overall unbeaten streak: 23 (11/10/1978–1/6/1979)

=== Game ===
Player

- Most goals in a game: Mike Hartman/Jack Laine/Jamie Wansbrough, 5 (vs SUNY-Buffalo, 2/20/1976)/(vs Ohio State, 2/25/1977)/(vs Notre Dame, 3/4/1983)
- Most assists in a game: Brian Hills, 7 (vs Ferris State, 1/15/1982)
- Most Goals in a period: [James Unger], 4 (vs UNO, 3/3/2007)
- Most points in a game: Mike Hall, 8 (vs Alaska-Fairbanks, 11/23/1995)

Team

- Most goals in a game: 15, 4 times (last time: vs Illinois-Chicago, 1/29/1983)
- Most goals in a period: 10 (vs SUNY-Buffalo, 2/20/1976 & vs Notre Dame, 11/26/1982)
- Most assists in a period: 18 (vs SUNY-Buffalo, 2/20/1976)

== See also ==
- Terry Flanagan Award
- Terry Flanagan Memorial Award
- Bowling Green Falcons
- Central Collegiate Hockey Association
