= 2025–26 Ferris State Bulldogs men's ice hockey season =

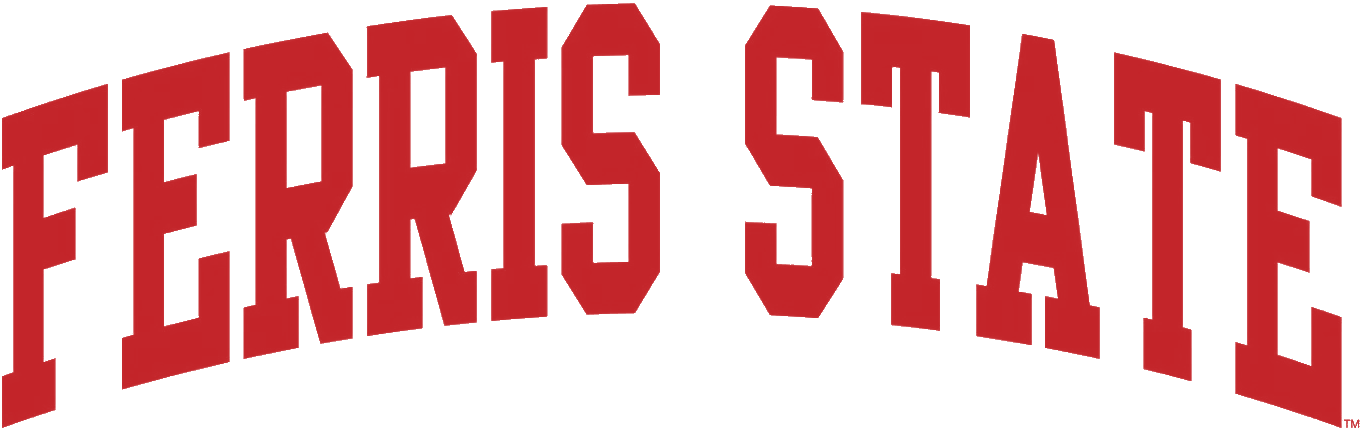
- Conference: 8th CCHA
- Home ice: Ewigleben Arena

Rankings
- USCHO: NR
- USA Hockey: NR

Record
- Overall: 8–27–2
- Conference: 6–18–2
- Home: 3–11–1
- Road: 5–14–1
- Neutral: 0–2–0

Coaches and captains
- Head coach: Brett Riley
- Assistant coaches: Zack Cisek; Justin DeMartino; Gehrig Sarosy
- Captain: Gavin Best
- Alternate captain(s): Nic Belpedio; Tyler Schleppe; Josh Zary

The 2025–26 Ferris State Bulldogs men's ice hockey season was the 51st season of play for the program and the 40th in the Central Collegiate Hockey Association (CCHA). The Bulldogs represented Ferris State University in the 2025–26 NCAA Division I men's ice hockey season, played their home games at Ewigleben Arena and were coached by Brett Riley in his 1st season.

== Season ==
Following the retirement of Bob Daniels at the end of the '25 season, Ferris State hired Brett Riley as the program's 7th head coach. Riley brought several players with him from Long Island and filled in the rest of the roster of incoming players with transfers. As a result, Ferris State became the first college ice hockey team to play without a true freshman on its roster since the NCAA began permitting first year students on varsity rosters in 1970. Under a new head coach, there was hope that the team's recent string of poor seasons would be reversed. When Ferris State recorded a surprising win over defending national champions, Western Michigan, in the second week of the season, it appeared that the Bulldogs were primed to turn the corner. Unfortunately for FSU, the club was unable to follow up on the signature win. Poor goaltending from the team's two transfers left Martin Lundberg as the best option in goal, however, none of the team's three goalies got much goal support.

Until the end of January, Ferris state averaged exactly 2 goals per game from their offense. However, once February arrived, the team suddenly found its footing. Over the final month of the regular season, Ferris State piled goals into the net, more than doubling their goals per game. While there wasn't enough time left in the campaign to change their position in the standings, the Bulldogs went into the playoffs with momentum on their side. Despite their newfound scoring touch, FSU ran head-first into one of the nation's top defensive teams and were stymied by Minnesota State in the first game. Unwilling to just lay down, Ferris recovered with an outstanding defensive effort in the rematch. Caden Brown's overtime winner gave FSU its second victory of the year over the Mavericks and extended the season for another game. Unfortunately for the Bulldogs, they couldn't hold off MSU for a second match and were overwhelmed by the Mavs in game three.

== Departures ==
Player	Position	Nationality	Cause
Cole Burtch	Forward	Canada	Transferred to Augustana
Matt Corbet	Forward	United States	Transferred to Calgary
Nico DeVita	Defenseman	United States	Graduation (retired)
Jacob Dirks	Forward	United States	Graduation (retired)
Kaleb Ergang	Forward	Canada	Graduation (signed with Adirondack Thunder)
Zach Faremouth	Forward	United States	Graduation (signed with Reading Royals)
Caiden Gault	Forward	Canada	Transferred to Northern Michigan
Nick Grimaldi	Forward	United States	Graduation (retired)
Connor McDonough	Goaltender	United States	Transferred to Massachusetts Boston
Nick Nardecchia	Forward	United States	Graduation (signed with Wichita Thunder)
Andrew Noel	Defenseman	United States	Signed professional contract (Cincinnati Cyclones)
Travis Shoudy	Defenseman	United States	Transferred to Michigan State
Noah West	Goaltender	United States	Graduation (signed with Kansas City Mavericks)

== Recruiting ==
Player	Position	Nationality	Age	Notes
Nic Belpedio	Defenseman	United States	23	Skokie, IL; graduate transfer from Colgate
Caden Brown	Forward	United States	22	St. Louis, MO; transfer from Ohio State; redshirt
Max Dukovac	Forward	United States	23	Aurora, IL; transfer from Miami
Hobie Hedquist	Goaltender	United States	22	Heron Lake, MN; transfer from North Dakota
John Lundy	Forward	United States	24	Brooklyn, NY; transfer from American International
Jack Mesic	Defenseman	United States	22	Plymouth, MI; transfer from Western Michigan
Brian Morse	Defenseman	United States	22	Fresno, CA; transfer from Maine; redshirt
Valtteri Piironen	Defenseman	Finland	24	Pyhäselkä, FIN; transfer from Long Island
Carter Rapalje	Forward	United States	24	Burlington, VT; transfer from Long Island; redshirt
Tanner Rowe	Forward	United States	23	Calumet, MI; transfer from Michigan
Noah Rupprecht	Goaltender	United States	23	Thief River Falls, MN; transfer from Long Island
Riley Wallack	Forward	Canada	24	South Surrey, BC; transfer from Long Island
Josh Zary	Forward	Canada	23	Nanaimo, BC; transfer from Long Island

== Roster ==
As of August 30, 2025.

No.	Nat.	Player	Class	Pos	Height	Weight	DoB	Hometown	Previous team	NHL rights
1	(United States)	Mason West	Freshman (RS)	G	6' 1" (1.85 m)	170 lb (77 kg)	2004-10-18	Traverse City, Michigan	Peoria Mustangs (NA3HL)	—
2	(United States)	Kade Turner	Sophomore	F	6' 0" (1.83 m)	185 lb (84 kg)	2003-02-04	Calgary, Alberta	Okotoks Oilers (BCHL)	—
3	(United States)	Logan Heroux	Sophomore	D	6' 1" (1.85 m)	190 lb (86 kg)	2003-05-30	Middletown, New Jersey	Shreveport Mudbugs (NAHL)	—
4	(Norway)	Christopher Lie	Sophomore	D	5' 10" (1.78 m)	163 lb (74 kg)	2005-07-27	Hamar, Norway	Malmö Redhawks J20 (J20 Nationell)	—
5	(Finland)	Valtteri Piironen	Senior	D	6' 4" (1.93 m)	201 lb (91 kg)	2001-09-11	Joensuu, Finland	Long Island (NCAA)	—
6	(Canada)	Xavier Jean-Louis	Senior	D	6' 5" (1.96 m)	205 lb (93 kg)	2001-06-25	Montreal, Quebec	Alaska (NCAA)	—
7	(Canada)	Connor McGrath	Senior	F	5' 9" (1.75 m)	184 lb (83 kg)	2003-09-04	Leroy, Saskatchewan	Humboldt Broncos (SJHL)	—
8	(Canada)	Tyler Schleppe (A)	Senior	F	6' 4" (1.93 m)	220 lb (100 kg)	2001-11-11	Vancouver, British Columbia	Langley Rivermen (BCHL)	—
9	(United States)	Nic Belpedio (A)	Graduate	D	5' 10" (1.78 m)	194 lb (88 kg)	2001-10-09	Skokie, Illinois	Colgate (ECAC)	—
10	(United States)	Jack Mesic	Junior	D	5' 9" (1.75 m)	176 lb (80 kg)	2002-10-18	Plymouth, Michigan	Western Michigan (NCHC)	—
11	(United States)	Brian Morse	Freshman (RS)	D	6' 1" (1.85 m)	165 lb (75 kg)	2003-02-06	Fresno, California	Maine (HEA)	—
12	(United States)	Caden Brown	Senior (RS)	D	5' 11" (1.8 m)	185 lb (84 kg)	2003-06-22	St. Louis, Missouri	Ohio State (Big Ten)	—
13	(Canada)	Josh Zary (A)	Senior	F	6' 0" (1.83 m)	190 lb (86 kg)	2001-10-15	Nanaimo, British Columbia	Long Island (NCAA)	—
15	(United States)	Jack Silich	Sophomore	F	5' 10" (1.78 m)	179 lb (81 kg)	2003-06-20	Long Grove, Illinois	Cranbrook Bucks (BCHL)	—
16	(Canada)	Holden Doell	Junior	F	5' 11" (1.8 m)	185 lb (84 kg)	2003-12-01	Martensville, Saskatchewan	Battlefords North Stars (SJHL)	—
17	(United States)	Luke Lisko	Sophomore	F	6' 1" (1.85 m)	181 lb (82 kg)	2004-05-24	Marine City, Michigan	Sherwood Park Crusaders (BCHL)	—
18	(United States)	Max Dukovac	Junior	F	6' 2" (1.88 m)	182 lb (83 kg)	2002-02-19	Aurora, Illinois	Miami (NCHC)	—
19	(United States)	Max Itagaki	Senior	F	5' 5" (1.65 m)	155 lb (70 kg)	2002-06-18	Glenview, Illinois	Army (AHA)	—
20	(United States)	Tanner Rowe	Junior	F	6' 1" (1.85 m)	179 lb (81 kg)	2002-08-26	Calumet, Michigan	Michigan (Big Ten)	—
21	(United States)	John Lundy	Senior	F	5' 9" (1.75 m)	163 lb (74 kg)	2001-04-27	Brooklyn, New York	American International (AHA)	—
22	(United States)	Emerson Goode	Junior	F	5' 9" (1.75 m)	180 lb (82 kg)	2002-10-16	Anaheim, California	Odessa Jackalopes (NAHL)	—
23	(Canada)	Riley Wallack	Senior	F	6' 5" (1.96 m)	225 lb (102 kg)	2001-04-05	South Surrey, British Columbia	Long Island (NCAA)	—
24	(United States)	Conner Brown	Sophomore	D	6' 0" (1.83 m)	190 lb (86 kg)	2003-12-23	Maplewood, Minnesota	Janesville Jets (NAHL)	—
26	(United States)	Jacob Badal	Senior	F	6' 0" (1.83 m)	205 lb (93 kg)	2001-10-05	Flushing, Michigan	Johnstown Tomahawks (NAHL)	—
27	(United States)	Gavin Best (C)	Senior	F	6' 2" (1.88 m)	190 lb (86 kg)	2001-08-24	Richfield, Minnesota	Michigan State (Big Ten)	—
28	(United States)	Trevor Taulien	Junior	D	6' 4" (1.93 m)	225 lb (102 kg)	2003-04-14	Crystal Lake, Illinois	Odessa Jackalopes (NAHL)	—
30	(United States)	Hobie Hedquist	Junior	G	6' 2" (1.88 m)	192 lb (87 kg)	2003-02-14	Heron Lake, Minnesota	North Dakota (NCHC)	—
31	(United States)	Noah Rupprecht	Junior	G	5' 11" (1.8 m)	180 lb (82 kg)	2002-06-15	Thief River Falls, Minnesota	Long Island (NCAA)	—
34	(United States)	Carter Rapalje	Junior (RS)	F	5' 10" (1.78 m)	170 lb (77 kg)	2001-08-10	Colorado Springs, Colorado	Long Island (NCAA)	—
55	(Norway)	Martin Lundberg	Sophomore	G	6' 1" (1.85 m)	172 lb (78 kg)	2005-02-04	Furuberget, Norway	Mora IK J20 (J20 Nationell)	—

== Standings ==
2025–26 Central Collegiate Hockey Association standings
	Conference record										Overall record					
	GP	W	L	T	OTW	OTL	SW	PTS	GF	GA	GP	W	L	T	GF	GA
#14 Minnesota State †*	26	14	7	5	1	2	3	51	71	53	40	22	11	7	111	81
#18 St. Thomas	26	15	7	4	2	1	2	50	89	67	38	21	12	5	131	109
#17 Augustana	26	14	8	4	1	2	3	50	72	49	37	22	11	4	109	74
Michigan Tech	26	16	7	3	3	1	0	49	84	59	39	23	13	3	126	106
Bowling Green	26	15	7	4	3	2	1	49	80	59	36	18	11	7	107	88
Bemidji State	26	11	11	4	5	1	3	36	69	68	36	13	19	4	98	103
Lake Superior State	26	8	16	2	1	4	2	31	57	83	36	11	22	3	92	121
Ferris State	26	6	18	2	1	2	1	22	70	100	37	8	27	2	91	138
Northern Michigan	26	3	21	2	0	2	0	13	44	98	34	3	29	2	56	132
Championship: March 20, 2026 † indicates conference regular-season champion (MacNaughton Cup) * indicates conference tournament champion (Mason Cup); Rankings: USCHO.com Top 20 Poll; updated March 22, 2026; Source: CCHA

== Schedule and results ==
Date	Time	Opponent^{#}	Rank^{#}	Site	TV	Decision	Result	Attendance	Record
Regular season
October 3	7:05 pm	at Miami*		Steve Cady Arena • Oxford, Ohio	RESN	Rupprecht	L 4–6	2,572	0–1–0
October 4	7:05 pm	at Miami*		Steve Cady Arena • Oxford, Ohio	RESN	Hedquist	L 1–3	2,101	0–2–0
October 9	7:07 pm	at #1 Western Michigan*		Lawson Arena • Kalamazoo, Michigan		Hedquist	W 3–2	4,178	1–2–0
October 10	7:07 pm	#1 Western Michigan*		Ewigleben Arena • Big Rapids, Michigan	Midco Sports+	Rupprecht	L 4–6	1,943	1–3–0
October 17	3:00 pm	vs. Simon Fraser*		USA Hockey Arena • Plymouth, Michigan (Exhibition)		Hedquist	W 3–2 ^{OT}		
October 18	7:00 pm	at USNTDP*		USA Hockey Arena • Plymouth, Michigan (Exhibition)		Hedquist	W 5–0		
October 24	7:07 pm	at Michigan Tech		MacInnes Student Ice Arena • Houghton, Michigan	Midco Sports+	Hedquist	L 1–5	3,490	1–4–0 (0–1–0)
October 25	6:07 pm	at Michigan Tech		MacInnes Student Ice Arena • Houghton, Michigan	Midco Sports+	Hedquist	L 2–4	3,234	1–5–0 (0–2–0)
October 31	7:07 pm	Lindenwood*		Ewigleben Arena • Big Rapids, Michigan	Midco Sports+	Lundberg	L 0–1	1,620	1–6–0
November 1	7:07 pm	Lindenwood*		Ewigleben Arena • Big Rapids, Michigan	Midco Sports+	Lundberg	L 2–3	1,710	1–7–0
November 7	7:07 pm	Augustana		Ewigleben Arena • Big Rapids, Michigan	Midco Sports+	Lundberg	L 2–4	1,592	1–8–0 (0–3–0)
November 8	6:07 pm	Augustana		Ewigleben Arena • Big Rapids, Michigan	Midco Sports+	Lundberg	W 2–0	1,619	2–8–0 (1–3–0)
November 14	7:07 pm	at Bowling Green		Slater Family Ice Arena • Bowling Green, Ohio	Midco Sports+	Lundberg	L 5–9	2,369	2–9–0 (1–4–0)
November 15	7:07 pm	at Bowling Green		Slater Family Ice Arena • Bowling Green, Ohio	Midco Sports+	Lundberg	L 2–5	2,835	2–10–0 (1–5–0)
November 21	7:07 pm	Lake Superior State		Ewigleben Arena • Big Rapids, Michigan	Midco Sports+	Lundberg	L 1–2	1,738	2–11–0 (1–6–0)
November 22	6:07 pm	Lake Superior State		Ewigleben Arena • Big Rapids, Michigan	Midco Sports+	Rupprecht	W 4–3	1,830	3–11–0 (2–6–0)
December 5	8:07 pm	at #13 Minnesota State		Mayo Clinic Health System Event Center • Mankato, Minnesota	Midco Sports+	Rupprecht	L 1–5	3,888	3–12–0 (2–7–0)
December 6	7:07 pm	at #13 Minnesota State		Mayo Clinic Health System Event Center • Mankato, Minnesota	Midco Sports+	Lundberg	W 4–1	3,971	4–12–0 (3–7–0)
December 12	7:07 pm	Michigan Tech		Ewigleben Arena • Big Rapids, Michigan	Midco Sports+	Lundberg	L 2–3	1,507	4–13–0 (3–8–0)
December 13	6:07 pm	Michigan Tech		Ewigleben Arena • Big Rapids, Michigan	Midco Sports+	Lundberg	L 2–5	1,834	4–14–0 (3–9–0)
Great Lakes Invitational
December 28	7:00 pm	vs. #3 Michigan State*		Van Andel Arena • Grand Rapids, Michigan (GLI Semifinal)	Midco Sports+	Lundberg	L 2–5	7,764	4–15–0
December 29	3:30 pm	vs. Miami*		Van Andel Arena • Grand Rapids, Michigan (GLI Consolation)	Midco Sports+	Hedquist	L 1–4	4,435	4–16–0
Regular season
January 2	8:07 pm	at St. Thomas		Lee & Penny Anderson Arena • Saint Paul, Minnesota	Midco Sports+	Lundberg	L 3–5	2,078	4–17–0 (3–10–0)
January 3	7:07 pm	at St. Thomas		Lee & Penny Anderson Arena • Saint Paul, Minnesota	Midco Sports+	Hedquist	L 4–8	2,258	4–18–0 (3–11–0)
January 9	7:07 pm	Bowling Green		Ewigleben Arena • Big Rapids, Michigan	Midco Sports+	Hedquist	L 1–3	1,128	4–19–0 (3–12–0)
January 10	6:07 pm	Bowling Green		Ewigleben Arena • Big Rapids, Michigan	Midco Sports+	Hedquist	L 1–5	1,318	4–20–0 (3–13–0)
January 16	8:07 pm	at #15 Augustana		Midco Arena • Sioux Falls, South Dakota	Midco Sports+	Hedquist	L 0–4	2,597	4–21–0 (3–14–0)
January 17	7:07 pm	at #15 Augustana		Midco Arena • Sioux Falls, South Dakota	Midco Sports+	Hedquist	L 3–4 ^{OT}	2,908	4–22–0 (3–15–0)
January 30	7:07 pm	#18 Minnesota State		Ewigleben Arena • Big Rapids, Michigan	Midco Sports+	Hedquist	L 1–6	1,823	4–23–0 (3–16–0)
January 31	6:07 pm	#18 Minnesota State		Ewigleben Arena • Big Rapids, Michigan	Midco Sports+	Rupprecht	L 3–4	2,016	4–24–0 (3–17–0)
February 6	8:07 pm	at Bemidji State		Sanford Center • Bemidji, Minnesota	Midco Sports+	Lundberg	W 6–3	1,593	5–24–0 (4–17–0)
February 7	7:07 pm	at Bemidji State		Sanford Center • Bemidji, Minnesota	Midco Sports+	Lundberg	L 3–4 ^{OT}	1,951	5–25–0 (4–18–0)
February 13	7:07 pm	Northern Michigan		Ewigleben Arena • Big Rapids, Michigan	Midco Sports+	Lundberg	T 4–4 ^{SOW}	1,867	5–25–1 (4–18–1)
February 14	6:07 pm	Northern Michigan		Ewigleben Arena • Big Rapids, Michigan	Midco Sports+	Lundberg	W 6–0	2,026	6–25–1 (5–18–1)
February 26	7:07 pm	at Lake Superior State		Taffy Abel Arena • Sault Ste. Marie, Michigan	Midco Sports+	Lundberg	W 5–2	611	7–25–1 (6–18–1)
February 27	6:07 pm	at Lake Superior State		Taffy Abel Arena • Sault Ste. Marie, Michigan	Midco Sports+	Lundberg	T 2–2 ^{SOL}	1,601	7–25–2 (6–18–2)
CCHA Tournament
March 6	8:07 pm	at #16 Minnesota State*		Mayo Clinic Health System Event Center • Mankato, Minnesota (CCHA Quarterfinal Game 1)	Midco Sports+	Lundberg	L 1–5	3,068	7–26–2 (6–18–2)
March 7	7:07 pm	at #16 Minnesota State*		Mayo Clinic Health System Event Center • Mankato, Minnesota (CCHA Quarterfinal Game 2)	Midco Sports+	Lundberg	W 2–1 ^{OT}	2,866	8–26–2 (6–18–2)
March 8	6:07 pm	at #16 Minnesota State*		Mayo Clinic Health System Event Center • Mankato, Minnesota (CCHA Quarterfinal Game 3)	Midco Sports+	Lundberg	L 0–2	2,065	8–27–2 (6–18–2)
*Non-conference game. ^{#}Rankings from USCHO.com Poll. All times are in Eastern Time. Source:

== Scoring statistics ==
Name	Position	Games	Goals	Assists	Points	PIM
Gavin Best	F	37	12	14	26	18
Josh Zary	F	36	13	7	20	28
Carter Rapalje	F	37	11	9	20	6
Max Itagaki	F	28	6	12	18	14
Christopher Lie	D	37	1	16	17	10
Tyler Schleppe	F	36	6	10	16	37
Xavier Alexandre Jean-Louis	D	37	5	10	15	23
Caden Brown	C	31	5	9	14	2
John Lundy	F	27	5	6	11	23
Max Dukovac	F	37	6	4	10	24
Jack Mesic	D	37	2	8	10	22
Connor McGrath	C	31	2	7	9	16
Riley Wallack	F	23	5	3	8	8
Holden Doell	F	25	3	4	7	10
Valtteri Piironen	D	29	1	6	7	14
Jack Silich	F	25	3	3	6	8
Trevor Taulien	D	37	1	5	6	64
Emerson Goode	C/W	15	2	2	4	6
Tanner Rowe	F	39	1	3	4	12
Nic Belpedio	D	29	0	4	4	10
Logan Heroux	D	32	0	4	4	24
Jacob Badal	LW	21	1	2	3	6
Kade Turner	D	12	0	1	1	8
Conner Brown	D	2	0	0	0	0
Luke Lisko	C	2	0	0	0	0
Noah Rupprecht	G	5	0	0	0	0
Brian Morse	D	12	0	0	0	6
Hobie Hedquist	G	13	0	0	0	0
Martin Lundberg	G	23	0	0	0	0
Total			91	145	236	409

== Goaltending statistics ==
Name	Games	Minutes	Wins	Losses	Ties	Goals Against	Saves	Shut Outs	SV %	GAA
Hobie Hedquist	13	674:10	1	10	0	45	328	0	.879	4.12
Martin Lundberg	23	1247:37	6	13	2	56	530	2	.904	2.74
Noah Rupprecht	5	277:58	1	4	0	23	130	0	.850	4.96
Empty Net	-	37:47	-	-	-	14	-	-	-	-
Total	37	2236:59	8	27	2	138	1008	2	.880	3.70

== Rankings ==
Poll	Week																											
Poll	Pre	1	2	3	4	5	6	7	8	9	10	11	12	13	14	15	16	17	18	19	20	21	22	23	24	25	26	27 (Final)
USCHO.com	NR	NR	NR	RV	NR	NR	NR	NR	NR	NR	NR	NR	–	NR	NR	NR	NR	NR	NR	NR	NR	NR	NR	NR	NR	NR	NR	NR
USA Hockey	NR	NR	NR	NR	NR	NR	NR	NR	NR	NR	NR	NR	–	NR	NR	NR	NR	NR	NR	NR	NR	NR	NR	NR	NR	NR	NR	NR

Note: USCHO did not release a poll in week 12.
Note: USA Hockey did not release a poll in week 12.
