= Shevils =

Norwegian hardcore band

- Origin: Oslo, Norway
- Genres: Hardcore, Rock
- Years active: 2010–present
- Members: Anders Voldrønning; Andreas André Myrvold; Anders Emil Rønning; Johan Magnus Staxrud
- Past members: Arnbjørn Joar Styrkor Marklund; Kristofer Staxrud; Christoffer Gaarder
- Website: www.shevils.com

Shevils is a Norwegian hardcore band from Oslo, Norway. The band has produced three full-length albums, two of which are self-released. They have toured Norway extensively from south to north and played Norway's big festivals such as Oyafestivalen and Trondheim Calling. Shevils' last 3 releases were recorded, mixed and produced by Marcus Forsgren (Jaga Jazzist, The Lionheart Brothers, Silence the Foe & U-FOES).

== Discography ==
- The Year Of The Fly (Oslo Grammofon, 2011) LP
- Necropolis (Self-Released, 2012) EP
- Lost In Tartarus (Self-Released, 2013) LP
- The White Sea (Self-Released, 2015) LP
- The Miracle of the Sun (Self-Released, 2021) LP

=== The Year of the Fly (2011) ===
Shevils released its debut album, The Year of the Fly, in November 2011. Milton Von Krogh, of the Norwegian hard rock band Pirate Love, and David Husvik of Extol and Doctor Midnight & The Mercy Cult produced the album. Many guest vocalists were featured on the album, including Ivar Nikolaisen (Silver), Silje Tombre (Blood Command), og Morten Øby (The Lionheart Brothers) as well as a guitar solo by Milton Von Krogh on To Wear A Whale.

=== Lost In Tartarus (2013) ===
The second full-length album for Shevils, Lost In Tartarus, was released two years after The Year of the Fly in November 2013, with the album art by Chris Faccone. The record caught the attention of many blogs and music news outlets, and as a result, gathered over 30 reviews of the album. The album also received radio play on Ruben, NRK Urørt and Pyro, which named Shevils one of Norway's most promising bands in 2013. Singles from Lost In Tartarus were A-listed on student radio in Bergen and Oslo. The band decided to release Lost In Tartarus independently so that it would be released as quickly as possible.

=== The White Sea (2015) ===
Deciding to go the self-released route once again, Shevils' third full-length release, The White Sea, was released in November 2015, featuring another piece of album art by Chris Faccone. Once again, The White Sea generate attention from blogs and music publications in Norway and worldwide. The White Sea was one of Metal Hammer Norway's top albums of 2015.

=== The Miracle of the Sun (2021) ===
Shevils released the album Miracle of the Sun on 7 May 2021, and has received praise and honour from a series of different magazines, websites and blogs, both in Norway and abroad. Some of the reviews include 8,5/10 in Scene Point Blank (Netherlands) https://www.scenepointblank.com/reviews/shevils/miracle-sun/, 20/20 in Eklektik Rock (France) https://www.eklektik-rock.com/2021/05/shevils-miracle-of-the-sun/, 9/10 in Musikknyheter.no (Norway) https://www.musikknyheter.no/anmeldelser/21421/Shevils.html, 8,5/10 i Metal Hammer Norway http://www.metalhammer.no/?p=14491, 8,5/10 in Riff Valley (Spain) https://www.riffvalley.es/cronicas/shevils-miracle-of-the-sun, and even reviews in Germany (Bierschinken) https://www.bierschinken.net/review/4408-shevils-miracle-of-the-sun, and The US (Tinnitist) https://tinnitist.com/2021/05/07/albums-of-the-week-shevils-miracle-of-the-sun/, (Average Music Blog) https://www.averagemusicblog.com/reviews/2021/5/17/shevils-drops-new-full-length-miracle-of-the-sun. The videos for the songs "Scandinavian Death Star" and "Monsters On TV" were published by Hardcore Worldwide on their YouTube channel. https://www.youtube.com/watch?v=gz78yTPTdLE https://www.youtube.com/watch?v=54AV8M4Bn8M

== Members ==
=== Present ===
- Anders Voldrønning: vocals
- Andreas Andre Myrvold: guitar
- Anders Emil Rønning: drums
- Johan Magnus Staxrud: bass, guitar

While there are only four official members of Shevils, other members comprise the rest of the band for live shows.

=== Live ===
- Andreas Engeseth: bass, guitar
- Ole Torstein Hovig: synthesizer
- Kristofer Staxrud: bass
- Markus Lind Aase: guitar, bass
- Torkil Rødvand: bass
- Peter Rudolfsen: drums
- Marcus Forsgren: bass, guitar

=== Past ===
Arnbjørn Joar Styrkor Marklund: bass
Kristofer Staxrud: drums
Christoffer Gaarder: guitar
