= To the Treetops! =

Studio album by Team Me
- Released: October 14, 2011
- Genre: Indie rock, indie folk, folk rock, electronic, pop
- Length: 58:00
- Label: Propeller Recordings
- Producer: Team Me

Singles from To the Treetops!
- 1. "Show Me" Released: January 18, 2012; 2. "With My Hands Covering Both of My Eyes I am Too Scared to Have a Look at You Now" Released: September 26, 2012

Professional ratings
Review scores
Source	Rating
Beats Per Minute	8.2/10 stars
Bowlegs Music	7/10 stars
This Is Fake DIY	7/10 stars

To the Treetops! is the first album by Norwegian indie band Team Me. It was released on October 14, 2011 on Propeller Records, in Norway, and was later released internationally on March 5. The album has been released digitally, and in CD and 2-LP format.

== Track listing ==
All lyrics are written by Marius Drogsås Hagen, except where noted; all music is composed by Team Me

No.	Title	Length
1.	"Riding My Bicycle (From Ragnvalsbekken to Sørkedalen)"	8:13
2.	"Show Me"	4:48
3.	"Patrick Wolf & Daniel Johns"	2:48
4.	"Weathervanes and Chemicals"	3:36
5.	"Fool"	4:46
6.	"Dear Sister"	5:39
7.	"Favorite Ghost"	8:05
8.	"Looking Thru the Eyes of Sir David Brewster"	4:34
9.	"With My Hands Covering Both of My Eyes I Am Too Scared to Have a Look at You Now"	5:34
10.	"Daggers"	5:56

iTunes bonus tracks
No.	Title	Length
11.	"Winter Olympics '94"	3:11

== Personnel ==
=== Team Me ===
- Marius Drogsås Hagen – vocals, guitar, piano
- Synne Øverland Knudsen – vocals, piano
- Simen Sandbæk Skari – backing vocals, piano
- Simen Schikulski – backing vocals, bass guitar
- Uno Møller Christiansen – backing vocals, guitar, drums
- Bjarne Alexander Ryen Berg – drums

=== Additional musicians ===
- Anders Magnor Killerud – backing vocals
- Annar By – backing vocals
- Herman Hulleberg – backing vocals
- Emilie Riddle – cello
- Julie Ofelia Østrem Ossum – cello
- Per Egil Knudsen – Flute
- Lars Bæk – backing vocals and percussion
- Yngve Hornsletten – backing vocals and percussion
- Tyge Møller Christiansen – percussion and noises
- Peder Jørgensen – vocals, piano, percussion
- Ingvild Nordstoga Eide – viola
- Daniel Lyngstad – violin
- Åsa Ree – violin
- Jeanette M. Larsen – vocals
