= 2025–26 Michigan Tech Huskies men's ice hockey season =

- Conference: T–4th CCHA
- Home ice: MacInnes Student Ice Arena

Record
- Overall: 23–13–3
- Conference: 16–7–3
- Home: 10–2–2
- Road: 11–9–1
- Neutral: 2–2–0

Coaches and captains
- Head coach: Bill Muckalt
- Assistant coaches: Benton Maass; L.J. Scarpace; Tyler Shelast
- Captain: Isaac Gordon
- Alternate captain(s): Jack Anderson; Max Koskipirtti; Joe Prouty

The 2025–26 Michigan Tech Huskies men's ice hockey season was the 105th season of play for the program and 8th in the CCHA. The Huskies represented Michigan Technological University in the 2025–26 NCAA Division I men's ice hockey season, played their home games at MacInnes Student Ice Arena and were coached by Bill Muckalt in his 1st season.

== Season ==
For Muckalt's first season behind the bench, he brought with him three players from his former team in Lindenwood. All three (Jack Anderson, Owen Bartoszkiewicz and Joe Prouty) would prove to be key contributors for the team over the course of the season. Aside from two transfer from Canadian colleges, the remainder of the recruiting class was made up of freshman, making the Huskies one of the youngest teams in the conference. From the beginning of the season, Bartoszkiewicz was installed as the starting netminder and, in spite of a few poor performances, he did not relinquish control of the crease. With a consistent presence in net, the rest of the team had plenty of runway to get their season off the ground. After an up and down start, they did just that and rose to the top of the CCHA standings by min-November.

The first big test for the team came around Thanksgiving when they travelled to take on Minnesota State. The Mavericks proved too much for the Huskies, sweeping the series thanks to their All-American goalie. Tech continued its winless streak the following weekend when St. Thomas took both games (one in a shootout) from Michigan Tech, dropping the team down into the middle of the national rankings. Tech was able to finish the first half of its season with a sweep of Ferris State and then lick their wounds before competing in two separate in-season tournaments.

Michigan Tech's appearance in the Great Lakes Invitational went about as well as could have been expected. They managed to defeat a resurgent Miami team before falling to #3 Michigan State in a credible performance. However, the following week the team was embarrassed by Air Force in a 2–8 shellacking that saw Bartoszkiewicz allow four goals in just over 8 minutes. Even with their subsequent win to finish third in the field, the Huskies had much to make up for in the Desert Hockey Classic. Coincidentally, the offense picked up the pace immediately afterwards and Tech reeled off a season-high 5-game winning streak. After a pair of losses, they then won four out of five and put themselves right into the thick of the playoff race. While Stiven Sardaryan had largely been responsible for the offense in the first half of the season, the increased assistance from players like Jack Anderson and Noah Reinhart paid major dividends in the second half.

Entering the final week of the season, Tech was sitting just outside the postseason at #18 and had a chance to win a regular season title. Unfortunately, the Huskies dropped a pair of 1-goal games to Bowling Green, knocking them out of the race for an at-large bid and dropping the team to 4th in the CCHA. While Tech just barely hung on to a home stand in the quarterfinals, they would have a chance to exact their revenge against the Falcons. The two games saw Bartoszkiewicz under siege by Bowling Green. The junior netminder faced over 80 shots on goal, almost double what Tech was able to bring to bear. Fortunately, Bartoszkiewicz was up to the task and turned aside 76 attempts. The offense, meanwhile, did its job and scored enough to secure the victory. Continuing their trend from the regular season, the goals were spread around with seven players accounting for eight markers.

After banishing the Falcons, Tech had to travel back to Minnesota to take on the Mavericks. The heavy workload caught up to Bartoszkiewicz who allowed 7 goals on just 12 shots in 34 minutes of game time. The shocking bad performance left the team no chance to win in the second half, particularly as they were facing one of the top defensive teams in the nation. The final score saw the Huskies' season end as they finished off a very promising season with a whimper.

== Departures ==
| Player | Position | Nationality | Cause |
|---|---|---|---|
| Henry Bartle | Forward | United States | Transferred to Alaska Anchorage |
| Oliver Bezick | Defenseman | United States | Left program (retired) |
| Matthew Campbell | Defenseman | Canada | Transferred to Merrimack |
| Quinn Disher | Forward | Canada | Transferred to British Columbia |
| Philip Fankl | Forward | Sweden | Signed professional contract (Västerviks IK) |
| Viktor Hurtig | Defenseman | Sweden | Signed professional contract (Karlskrona HK) |
| Logan Morrell | Forward | United States | Transferred to Arizona State |
| Derek Mullahy | Goaltender | United States | Graduation (retired) |
| Alexander Nordstrom | Forward | United States | Graduation (retired) |
| Marcus Pedersen | Forward | Sweden | Graduation (signed with Karlskrona HK) |
| Chase Pietila | Defenseman | United States | Signed professional contract (Pittsburgh Penguins) |
| Blais Richartz | Forward | United States | Graduation (retired) |
| Trevor Russell | Defenseman | United States | Graduate transfer to Rensselaer |
| Nick Williams | Defenseman | United States | Transferred to St. Thomas |
| Jack Works | Forward | Canada | Graduation (signed with Wheeling Nailers) |

== Recruiting ==
| Player | Position | Nationality | Age | Notes |
|---|---|---|---|---|
| Ryan Abraham | Forward | United States | 21 | Livonia, MI |
| Jack Anderson | Defenseman | United States | 22 | St. Louis, MO; transfer from Lindenwood |
| Reid Andresen | Defenseman | Canada | 20 | Saskatoon, SK |
| Owen Bartoszkiewicz | Goaltender | United States | 22 | Northville, MI; transfer from Lindenwood |
| Carson Birnie | Forward | Canada | 20 | Arcola, SK |
| Brayden Boehm | Forward | Canada | 21 | Nanaimo, BC |
| Michael Cicek | Forward | Canada | 21 | Winnipeg, MB |
| Reid Daavettila | Forward | United States | 20 | Howell, MI |
| Luca Fasciano | Defenseman | Canada | 22 | Toronto, ON; joined mid-season |
| Rylan Gould | Forward | Canada | 20 | Headingley, MB |
| Carson Latimer | Forward | Canada | 22 | White Rock, BC; transfer from British Columbia; selected 123rd overall in 2021 |
| Max Matthews | Defenseman | United States | 21 | Arlington Heights, IL |
| Kalem Parker | Defenseman | Canada | 20 | Clavet, SK; selected 181st overall in 2023 |
| Braden Pietila | Defenseman | United States | 20 | Howell, MI |
| Joe Prouty | Defenseman | United States | 23 | Apple Valley, MN; transfer from Lindenwood |
| Noah Reinhart | Forward | Canada | 21 | Dundas, ON |
| Teydon Trembecky | Forward | Canada | 20 | Strathcona, AB |
| Matthew Van Blaricom | Forward | Canada | 18 | Southey, SK |

== Roster ==
As of August 21, 2025.

| No. | Nat. | Player | Class | Pos | Height | Weight | DoB | Hometown | Previous team | NHL rights |
|---|---|---|---|---|---|---|---|---|---|---|
| 2 | (Finland) | Tom Leppä | Sophomore | F | 6' 0" (1.83 m) | 183 lb (83 kg) | 2005-07-31 | Kauniainen, Finland | Fargo Force (USHL) | — |
| 3 | (Canada) | Rylan Brown | Sophomore | D | 6' 0" (1.83 m) | 161 lb (73 kg) | 2005-01-23 | Sherwood Park, Alberta | Okotoks Oilers (BCHL) | — |
| 4 | (United States) | Jack Anderson (A) | Senior | D | 6' 6" (1.98 m) | 225 lb (102 kg) | 2002-11-14 | St. Louis, Missouri | Lindenwood (NAHL) | — |
| 5 | (United States) | Max Matthews | Freshman | D | 6' 1" (1.85 m) | 190 lb (86 kg) | 2004-02-28 | Arlington Heights, Illinois | New Mexico Ice Wolves (NAHL) | — |
| 6 | (Canada) | Brayden Boehm | Freshman | F | 6' 0" (1.83 m) | 187 lb (85 kg) | 2004-01-15 | Nanaimo, British Columbia | Victoria Royals (WHL) | — |
| 7 | (Finland) | Kasper Vähärautio | Senior | D | 6' 0" (1.83 m) | 187 lb (85 kg) | 2002-10-02 | Helsinki, Finland | Jokerit U20 (U20 SM-sarja) | — |
| 8 | (Canada) | Kalem Parker | Freshman | D | 6' 0" (1.83 m) | 187 lb (85 kg) | 2004-10-12 | Clavet, Saskatchewan | Calgary Hitmen (WHL) | MIN, 181st overall 2023 |
| 9 | (Canada) | Carson Latimer | Sophomore | F | 6' 1" (1.85 m) | 192 lb (87 kg) | 2003-01-10 | White Rock, British Columbia | British Columbia (CWUAA) | OTT, 123rd overall 2021 |
| 10 | (Finland) | Elias Jansson | Sophomore | F | 6' 0" (1.83 m) | 187 lb (85 kg) | 2005-04-13 | Oulu, Finland | Oulun Kärpät J20 (U20 SM-sarja) | — |
| 11 | (United States) | Owen Baker | Junior | F | 5' 10" (1.78 m) | 185 lb (84 kg) | 2004-01-29 | Howell, Michigan | Michigan State (Big Ten) | — |
| 12 | (United States) | Ryan Abraham | Freshman | F | 5' 8" (1.73 m) | 168 lb (76 kg) | 2004-04-05 | Livonia, Michigan | Windsor Spitfires (OHL) | — |
| 13 | (Canada) | Tyler Miller | Sophomore | D | 6' 0" (1.83 m) | 176 lb (80 kg) | 2004-09-16 | Medicine Hat, Alberta | Waterloo Black Hawks (USHL) | — |
| 14 | (Finland) | Max Koskipirtti (A) | Junior | F | 6' 0" (1.83 m) | 180 lb (82 kg) | 2004-08-16 | Espoo, Finland | Kiekko-Espoo U20 (U20 SM-sarja) | — |
| 15 | (Canada) | Carson Birnie | Freshman | F | 6' 1" (1.85 m) | 187 lb (85 kg) | 2005-02-22 | Arcola, Saskatchewan | Calgary Hitmen (WHL) | — |
| 16 | (Canada) | Isaac Gordon (C) | Junior | F | 5' 11" (1.8 m) | 190 lb (86 kg) | 2004-01-29 | Landmark, Manitoba | Sioux Falls Stampede (USHL) | — |
| 17 | (United States) | Reid Daavettila | Freshman | F | 6' 2" (1.88 m) | 198 lb (90 kg) | 2005-03-04 | Howell, Michigan | Waterloo Black Hawks (USHL) | — |
| 18 | (Canada) | Noah Reinhart | Freshman | F | 6' 1" (1.85 m) | 201 lb (91 kg) | 2004-05-09 | Dundas, Ontario | Val-d'Or Foreurs (QMJHL) | — |
| 19 | (Canada) | Michael Cicek | Freshman | F | 6' 1" (1.85 m) | 190 lb (86 kg) | 2004-01-26 | Winnipeg, Manitoba | Kelowna Rockets (WHL) | — |
| 20 | (United States) | Joe Prouty (A) | Senior | D | 6' 0" (1.83 m) | 180 lb (82 kg) | 2001-11-29 | Burnsville, Minnesota | Lindenwood (NCAA) | — |
| 21 | (Canada) | Reid Andresen | Freshman | D | 5' 9" (1.75 m) | 165 lb (75 kg) | 2005-04-29 | Saskatoon, Saskatchewan | Wenatchee Wild (WHL) | — |
| 22 | (Canada) | Matthew Van Blaricom | Freshman | F | 5' 11" (1.8 m) | 174 lb (79 kg) | 2006-08-26 | Southey, Saskatchewan | Muskegon Lumberjacks (USHL) | — |
| 23 | (United States) | Trevor Kukkonen | Senior | F | 5' 11" (1.8 m) | 181 lb (82 kg) | 2001-02-01 | Maple Grove, Minnesota | Minnesota Magicians (NAHL) | — |
| 24 | (Canada) | Rylan Gould | Freshman | F | 5' 10" (1.78 m) | 181 lb (82 kg) | 2005-08-05 | Headingley, Manitoba | Swift Current Broncos (WHL) | — |
| 25 | (United States) | Braden Pietila | Freshman | D | 6' 1" (1.85 m) | 185 lb (84 kg) | 2004-11-25 | Howell, Michigan | Odessa Jackalopes (NAHL) | — |
| 26 | (Sweden) | Luca Fasciano | Freshman | D | 6' 4" (1.93 m) | 209 lb (95 kg) | 2003-07-10 | Toronto, Ontario | Lakehead (OUA) | — |
| 27 | (Finland) | Lauri Raiman | Junior | F | 5' 11" (1.8 m) | 181 lb (82 kg) | 2004-01-27 | Vantaa, Finland | Lahti Pelicans U20 (U20 SM-sarja) | — |
| 28 | (Canada) | Teydon Trembecky | Freshman | F | 5' 11" (1.8 m) | 181 lb (82 kg) | 2005-05-28 | Strathcona, Alberta | Victoria Royals (WHL) | — |
| 29 | (Canada) | Ryder Matter | Sophomore | F | 6' 0" (1.83 m) | 185 lb (84 kg) | 2004-09-15 | Beaumont, Alberta | Spruce Grove Saints (BCHL) | — |
| 30 | (Finland) | Max Väyrynen | Senior | G | 6' 2" (1.88 m) | 183 lb (83 kg) | 2002-06-18 | Espoo, Finland | Porin Ässät U20 (U20 SM-sarja) | — |
| 31 | (United States) | Bryant Lee | Sophomore | G | 6' 0" (1.83 m) | 170 lb (77 kg) | 2006-07-14 | Houghton, Michigan | Houghton High School (MHSAA) | — |
| 35 | (United States) | Owen Bartoszkiewicz | Junior | G | 6' 1" (1.85 m) | 195 lb (88 kg) | 2003-03-11 | Northville, Michigan | Lindenwood (NCAA) | — |
| 37 | (United States) | Ryan Manzella | Sophomore | G | 6' 0" (1.83 m) | 174 lb (79 kg) | 2004-03-17 | Eagan, Minnesota | Sioux Falls Stampede (USHL) | — |
| 77 | (Russia) | Stiven Sardarian | Senior | F | 6' 1" (1.85 m) | 170 lb (77 kg) | 2003-02-07 | Saint Petersburg, Russia | New Hampshire (HEA) | BUF, 88th overall 2021 |

== Standings ==
2025–26 Central Collegiate Hockey Association standings
| | Conference record | | | | | | | | | | Overall record | | | | | |
| | GP | W | L | T | OTW | OTL | SW | PTS | GF | GA | GP | W | L | T | GF | GA |
|---|---|---|---|---|---|---|---|---|---|---|---|---|---|---|---|---|
| #14 Minnesota State †* | 26 | 14 | 7 | 5 | 1 | 2 | 3 | 51 | 71 | 53 | 39 | 22 | 10 | 7 | 110 | 78 |
| #17 St. Thomas | 26 | 15 | 7 | 4 | 2 | 1 | 2 | 50 | 89 | 67 | 38 | 21 | 12 | 5 | 131 | 109 |
| #18 Augustana | 26 | 14 | 8 | 4 | 1 | 2 | 3 | 50 | 72 | 49 | 37 | 22 | 11 | 4 | 109 | 74 |
| Michigan Tech | 26 | 16 | 7 | 3 | 3 | 1 | 0 | 49 | 84 | 59 | 39 | 23 | 13 | 3 | 126 | 106 |
| Bowling Green | 26 | 15 | 7 | 4 | 3 | 2 | 1 | 49 | 80 | 59 | 36 | 18 | 11 | 7 | 107 | 88 |
| Bemidji State | 26 | 11 | 11 | 4 | 5 | 1 | 3 | 36 | 69 | 68 | 36 | 13 | 19 | 4 | 98 | 103 |
| Lake Superior State | 26 | 8 | 16 | 2 | 1 | 4 | 2 | 31 | 57 | 83 | 36 | 11 | 22 | 3 | 92 | 121 |
| Ferris State | 26 | 6 | 18 | 2 | 1 | 2 | 1 | 22 | 70 | 100 | 37 | 8 | 27 | 2 | 91 | 138 |
| Northern Michigan | 26 | 3 | 21 | 2 | 0 | 2 | 0 | 13 | 44 | 98 | 34 | 3 | 29 | 2 | 56 | 132 |
Championship: March 20, 2026 † indicates conference regular-season champion (MacNaughton Cup) * indicates conference tournament champion (Mason Cup); Rankings: USCHO.com Top 20 Poll; updated March 22, 2026; Source: CCHA

== Schedule and results ==
| Date | Time | Opponent^{#} | Rank^{#} | Site | TV | Decision | Result | Attendance | Record |
Regular Season
| October 3 | 8:00 pm | at #8 Minnesota* | | 3M Arena at Mariucci • Minneapolis, Minnesota | Fox9+ | Bartoszkiewicz | L 3–6 | 9,580 | 0–1–0 |
| October 4 | 8:00 pm | at #8 Minnesota* | | 3M Arena at Mariucci • Minneapolis, Minnesota | Fox9+ | Bartoszkiewicz | W 5–3 | 8,972 | 1–1–0 |
| October 17 | 11:07 pm | at Alaska* | | Carlson Center • Fairbanks, Alaska | FloHockey | Bartoszkiewicz | W 3–1 | 2,164 | 2–1–0 |
| October 18 | 11:07 pm | at Alaska* | | Carlson Center • Fairbanks, Alaska | FloHockey | Väyrynen | L 1–5 | 3,120 | 2–2–0 |
| October 24 | 7:07 pm | Ferris State | | MacInnes Student Ice Arena • Houghton, Michigan | Midco Sports+ | Bartoszkiewicz | W 5–1 | 3,490 | 3–2–0 (1–0–0) |
| October 25 | 5:07 pm | Ferris State | | MacInnes Student Ice Arena • Houghton, Michigan | Midco Sports+ | Bartoszkiewicz | W 4–2 | 3,234 | 4–2–0 (2–0–0) |
| October 31 | 7:00 pm | at Clarkson* | | Cheel Arena • Potsdam, New York | ESPN+ | Bartoszkiewicz | L 4–6 | 2,532 | 4–3–0 |
| November 1 | 7:00 pm | at St. Lawrence* | | Appleton Arena • Canton, New York | ESPN+ | Bartoszkiewicz | W 3–0 | 728 | 5–3–0 |
| November 7 | 7:07 pm | Northern Michigan | | MacInnes Student Ice Arena • Houghton, Michigan (Rivalry) | Midco Sports+ | Bartoszkiewicz | W 4–1 | 3,826 | 6–3–0 (3–0–0) |
| November 8 | 6:07 pm | at Northern Michigan | | Berry Events Center • Marquette, Michigan (Rivalry) | Midco Sports+ | Bartoszkiewicz | W 4–2 | 4,202 | 7–3–0 (4–0–0) |
| November 14 | 7:07 pm | Bemidji State | | MacInnes Student Ice Arena • Houghton, Michigan | Midco Sports+ | Bartoszkiewicz | T 2–2 ^{SOL} | 2,893 | 7–3–1 (4–0–1) |
| November 15 | 6:07 pm | Bemidji State | | MacInnes Student Ice Arena • Houghton, Michigan | Midco Sports+ | Bartoszkiewicz | W 2–1 ^{OT} | 3,026 | 8–3–1 (5–0–1) |
| November 21 | 8:07 pm | at #14 Minnesota State | | Mayo Clinic Health System Event Center • Mankato, Minnesota | Midco Sports+ | Bartoszkiewicz | L 0–3 | 4,222 | 8–4–1 (5–1–1) |
| November 22 | 7:07 pm | at #14 Minnesota State | | Mayo Clinic Health System Event Center • Mankato, Minnesota | Midco Sports+ | Bartoszkiewicz | L 2–3 | 4,054 | 8–5–1 (5–2–1) |
| November 28 | 7:07 pm | St. Thomas | | MacInnes Student Ice Arena • Houghton, Michigan | Midco Sports+ | Bartoszkiewicz | T 3–3 ^{SOL} | 3,039 | 8–5–2 (5–2–2) |
| November 29 | 6:07 pm | St. Thomas | | MacInnes Student Ice Arena • Houghton, Michigan | Midco Sports+ | Bartoszkiewicz | L 1–2 | 3,403 | 8–6–2 (5–3–2) |
| December 12 | 7:07 pm | at Ferris State | | Ewigleben Arena • Big Rapids, Michigan | Midco Sports+ | Bartoszkiewicz | W 3–2 | 1,507 | 9–6–2 (6–3–2) |
| December 13 | 6:07 pm | at Ferris State | | Ewigleben Arena • Big Rapids, Michigan | Midco Sports+ | Bartoszkiewicz | W 5–2 | 1,834 | 10–6–2 (7–3–2) |
Great Lakes Invitational
| December 28 | 3:30 pm | vs. Miami* | | Van Andel Arena • Grand Rapids, Michigan (Great Lakes Semifinal) | Midco Sports+ | Bartoszkiewicz | W 5–2 | 7,764 | 11–6–2 |
| December 29 | 7:00 pm | vs. #3 Michigan State* | | Van Andel Arena • Grand Rapids, Michigan (Great Lakes Championship) | Midco Sports+ | Bartoszkiewicz | L 1–4 | 5,024 | 11–7–2 |
Desert Hockey Classic
| January 2 | 5:00 pm | vs. Air Force* | | Mullett Arena • Tempe, Arizona (Desert Hockey Semifinal) | | Bartoszkiewicz | L 2–8 | 2,500 | 11–8–2 |
| January 3 | 6:00 pm | vs. Alaska Anchorage* | | Mullett Arena • Tempe, Arizona (Desert Hockey Consolation Game) | | Bartoszkiewicz | W 5–0 | — | 12–8–2 |
| January 9 | 8:07 pm | at Bemidji State | | Sanford Center • Bemidji, Minnesota | Midco Sports+ | Bartoszkiewicz | W 5–2 | 2,103 | 13–8–2 (8–3–2) |
| January 10 | 7:07 pm | at Bemidji State | | Sanford Center • Bemidji, Minnesota | Midco Sports+ | Bartoszkiewicz | W 4–3 | 1,793 | 14–8–2 (9–3–2) |
| January 16 | 7:07 pm | #17 Minnesota State | | MacInnes Student Ice Arena • Houghton, Michigan | Midco Sports+ | Bartoszkiewicz | W 3–1 | 3,375 | 15–8–2 (10–3–2) |
| January 17 | 6:07 pm | #17 Minnesota State | | MacInnes Student Ice Arena • Houghton, Michigan | Midco Sports+ | Bartoszkiewicz | W 4–1 | 3,400 | 16–8–2 (11–3–2) |
| January 23 | 7:07 pm | at Northern Michigan | #19 | Berry Events Center • Marquette, Michigan (Rivalry) | Midco Sports+, Fox UP | Bartoszkiewicz | W 8–2 | 4,163 | 17–8–2 (12–3–2) |
| January 24 | 6:07 pm | Northern Michigan | #19 | MacInnes Student Ice Arena • Houghton, Michigan (Rivalry) | Midco Sports+, Fox UP | Bartoszkiewicz | L 2–3 | 4,071 | 17–9–2 (12–4–2) |
| January 30 | 8:07 pm | at #15 St. Thomas | #19 | Lee & Penny Anderson Arena • Saint Paul, Minnesota | Midco Sports+ | Bartoszkiewicz | L 2–4 | 2,751 | 17–10–2 (12–5–2) |
| January 31 | 7:07 pm | at #15 St. Thomas | #19 | Lee & Penny Anderson Arena • Saint Paul, Minnesota | Midco Sports+ | Bartoszkiewicz | W 4–3 | 2,787 | 18–10–2 (13–5–2) |
| February 6 | 7:07 pm | #16 Augustana | #20 | MacInnes Student Ice Arena • Houghton, Michigan | Midco Sports+ | Bartoszkiewicz | W 3–2 ^{OT} | 3,835 | 19–10–2 (14–5–2) |
| February 7 | 5:07 pm | #16 Augustana | #20 | MacInnes Student Ice Arena • Houghton, Michigan | Midco Sports+ | Bartoszkiewicz | W 4–3 | 4,000 | 20–10–2 (15–5–2) |
| February 13 | 7:07 pm | at Lake Superior State | #17 | Taffy Abel Arena • Sault Ste. Marie, Michigan | Midco Sports+ | Bartoszkiewicz | T 2–2 ^{SOL} | 1,501 | 20–10–3 (15–5–3) |
| February 14 | 6:07 pm | at Lake Superior State | #17 | Taffy Abel Arena • Sault Ste. Marie, Michigan | Midco Sports+ | Bartoszkiewicz | W 5–4 ^{OT} | 989 | 21–10–3 (16–5–3) |
| February 27 | 7:07 pm | Bowling Green | #16 | MacInnes Student Ice Arena • Houghton, Michigan | Midco Sports+ | Bartoszkiewicz | L 0–1 | 3,351 | 21–11–3 (16–6–3) |
| February 28 | 6:07 pm | Bowling Green | #16 | MacInnes Student Ice Arena • Houghton, Michigan | Midco Sports+ | Bartoszkiewicz | L 3–4 ^{OT} | 3,551 | 21–12–3 (16–7–3) |
CCHA Tournament
| March 6 | 7:07 pm | Bowling Green* | #20 | MacInnes Student Ice Arena • Houghton, Michigan (CCHA Quarterfinal Game 1) | Midco Sports+ | Bartoszkiewicz | W 5–3 | 2,836 | 22–12–3 |
| March 7 | 6:07 pm | Bowling Green* | #20 | MacInnes Student Ice Arena • Houghton, Michigan (CCHA Quarterfinal Game 2) | Midco Sports+ | Bartoszkiewicz | W 3–2 | 3,160 | 23–12–3 |
| March 14 | 8:07 pm | at #16 Minnesota State* | #19 | Mayo Clinic Health System Event Center • Mankato, Minnesota (CCHA Semifinal) | Midco Sports+ | Bartoszkiewicz | L 2–7 | 3,520 | 23–13–3 |
*Non-conference game. ^{#}Rankings from USCHO.com Poll. All times are in Eastern Time. Source:

== Scoring statistics ==
| Name | Position | Games | Goals | Assists | Points | PIM |
|---|---|---|---|---|---|---|
| Stiven Sardaryan | LW/RW | 37 | 12 | 32 | 44 | 30 |
| Max Koskipirtti | C/W | 39 | 13 | 22 | 35 | 4 |
| Isaac Gordon | C | 38 | 8 | 21 | 29 | 10 |
| Teydon Trembecky | F | 36 | 15 | 11 | 26 | 6 |
| Jack Anderson | D | 39 | 11 | 13 | 24 | 33 |
| Elias Jansson | F | 37 | 8 | 14 | 22 | 8 |
| Noah Reinhart | RW | 39 | 9 | 12 | 21 | 10 |
| Tom Leppä | C | 39 | 6 | 13 | 19 | 10 |
| Reid Andresen | D | 39 | 4 | 10 | 14 | 4 |
| Joe Prouty | D | 39 | 2 | 12 | 14 | 22 |
| Carson Latimer | RW | 35 | 7 | 6 | 13 | 4 |
| Kalem Parker | D | 39 | 4 | 9 | 13 | 4 |
| Tyler Miller | D | 39 | 3 | 10 | 13 | 18 |
| Matthew Van Blaricom | F | 28 | 2 | 8 | 10 | 10 |
| Brayden Boehm | C/W | 28 | 6 | 3 | 9 | 24 |
| Luca Fasciano | D | 29 | 5 | 4 | 9 | 18 |
| Michael Cicek | F | 33 | 2 | 7 | 9 | 6 |
| Carson Birnie | C | 38 | 4 | 4 | 8 | 20 |
| Reid Daavettila | F | 30 | 1 | 7 | 8 | 6 |
| Lauri Raiman | C/W | 11 | 2 | 1 | 3 | 0 |
| Ryan Abraham | C/LW | 6 | 1 | 1 | 2 | 2 |
| Owen Baker | RW | 7 | 0 | 2 | 2 | 0 |
| Rylan Gould | C | 6 | 1 | 0 | 1 | 4 |
| Rylan Brown | D | 9 | 0 | 1 | 1 | 8 |
| Owen Bartoszkiewicz | G | 38 | 0 | 1 | 1 | 4 |
| Bryant Lee | G | 1 | 0 | 0 | 0 | 0 |
| Max Matthews | D | 1 | 0 | 0 | 0 | 0 |
| Max Väyrynen | G | 1 | 0 | 0 | 0 | 0 |
| Ryan Manzella | G | 2 | 0 | 0 | 0 | 0 |
| Trevor Kukkonen | F | 4 | 0 | 0 | 0 | 0 |
| Ryder Matter | F | 4 | 0 | 0 | 0 | 0 |
| Kasper Vähärautio | D | 11 | 0 | 0 | 0 | 4 |
| Bench | – | – | – | – | – | 10 |
| Total | | | 126 | 224 | 350 | 291 |

== Goaltending statistics ==
| Name | Games | Minutes | Wins | Losses | Ties | Goals against | Saves | Shut outs | SV % | GAA |
|---|---|---|---|---|---|---|---|---|---|---|
| Bryant Lee | 2 | 1:09 | 0 | 0 | 0 | 0 | 1 | 0 | 1.000 | 0.00 |
| Owen Bartoszkiewicz | 38 | 2211:37 | 23 | 12 | 3 | 93 | 978 | 2 | .913 | 2.52 |
| Ryan Manzella | 2 | 75:49 | 0 | 0 | 0 | 4 | 34 | 0 | .895 | 3.17 |
| Max Väyrynen | 1 | 59:20 | 0 | 1 | 0 | 5 | 30 | 0 | .857 | 5.06 |
| Empty Net | - | 18:02 | - | - | - | 4 | - | - | - | - |
| Total | 39 | 2365:57 | 23 | 13 | 3 | 106 | 1043 | 2 | .908 | 2.69 |

== Rankings ==
| Poll | Week | | | | | | | | | | | | | | | | | | | | | | | | | | | |
| Poll | Pre | 1 | 2 | 3 | 4 | 5 | 6 | 7 | 8 | 9 | 10 | 11 | 12 | 13 | 14 | 15 | 16 | 17 | 18 | 19 | 20 | 21 | 22 | 23 | 24 | 25 | 26 | 27 (Final) |
|---|---|---|---|---|---|---|---|---|---|---|---|---|---|---|---|---|---|---|---|---|---|---|---|---|---|---|---|---|
| USCHO.com | RV | RV | RV | RV | RV | RV | RV | RV | RV | RV | RV | RV | – | RV | RV | RV | 19 | 19 | 20 | 17 | 16 | 16 | 20 | 19 | RV | RV | | |
| USA Hockey | NR | RV | RV | NR | RV | RV | RV | RV | NR | NR | NR | NR | – | RV | NR | RV | 19 | 20 | 20 | 17 | 16 | 17 | RV | 19 | 20т | RV | | |

Note: USCHO did not release a poll in week 12.
Note: USA Hockey did not release a poll in week 12.
