= 2025–26 Bowling Green Falcons men's ice hockey season =

- Conference: 5th CCHA
- Home ice: Slater Family Ice Arena

Rankings
- USCHO: NR
- USA Hockey: NR

Record
- Overall: 18–11–7
- Conference: 15–7–4
- Home: 8–5–3
- Road: 10–6–4

Coaches and captains
- Head coach: Dennis Williams
- Assistant coaches: Curtis Carr; Matt Nicholson; Jacob Pritchard; Buddy Powers
- Captain: Dalton Norris
- Alternate captain(s): Jaden Grant; Gustav Stjernberg

The 2025–26 Bowling Green Falcons men's ice hockey season was the 57th season of play for the program and the 47th in the CCHA. The Falcons represented Bowling Green State University in the 2025–26 NCAA Division I men's ice hockey season, played their home games at the Slater Family Ice Arena and were coached by Dennis Williams in his 3rd season.

== Season ==
While Bowling Green had a sizable amount of roster turnover from last season, that had become a feature for most teams in the transfer portal era. However, this year the Falcons took advantage of a new NCAA policy, the newfound eligibility of Canadian Hockey League players, to fill out its lineup. Ten of eleven incoming freshmen arrived from major junior hockey while another (transfer Tyler Palmer) had previously played in the WHL. The heavy reliance on Canadian players did not look like it would pay off early when the Falcons were swept by Niagara to open the campaign. The first month of the season did not produce many positives for the Falcons as the team was unable to find any consistency. Bowling Green had three separate starters in the first four weeks but it was the hot-and-cold scoring that was their biggest problem.

By mid-November, the Falcons seemed to find their stride and the team managed to put together a good stretch of games. The team had a rather odd goaltending situation as three separate netminders (Palmer, Cole Moore and Jacob Steinman) all proved to be capable in goal. However, because only one goaltender can be on the ice at a time, the team had some difficulty in getting game time to all three. That strange situation was unfortunately resolved when Steinman was felled by a season-ending injury on February 14. On the offensive side of the puck, while the team was rife with new players, the scoring was led by two old hands in Quinn Emerson and Ben Doran. Though there wasn't a frontrunner in terms of goals, the Falcons received contributions from up and down the lineup, averaging just shy of 3 goals per game.

The second half of the season was roughly equal to the first with Bowling Green winning a majority of its games and only once losing consecutive matches. The Falcons ended the regular season running through a gauntlet of ranked opponents and came out with a slightly above-average mark; however, a failure to win several games against inferior opponents held the Falcons' national ranking down. By the end of the regular season, even though the team was 9 games above .500, Bowling Green sat below the cut line for the postseason. Additionally, because their final game had been won in overtime, they finished just behind Michigan Tech in the standings and would be forced to hit the road for the conference quarterfinals.

With their season hanging in the balance, Bowling Green dominated the shot total in the first game against the Huskies but were let down by their goaltending. Palmer allowed 4 goals on just 17 shots and was replaced by Moore for the rematch. Once again, the Falcons ran up a large shot advantage but this time it was the offense that left them down. Bowling Green scored just 2 goals on 42 shots, the final coming after Tech had scored into an empty net that proved to be the game-winner.

This season saw the program record its 1,000th win in the regular season.

== Departures ==
Player	Position	Nationality	Cause
Michael Bevilacqua	Defenseman	United States	Transferred to Lindenwood
Pete Eigner	Goaltender	United States	Graduation (retired)
Salvatore Evola	Goaltender	United States	Transferred to Mercyhurst
Seth Fyten	Forward	Canada	Graduation (signed with Savannah Ghost Pirates)
Ville Immonen	Forward	Finland	Graduation (signed with Vaasan Sport)
Matvei Kabanov	Forward	Russia	Signed professional contract (HC Lada Togliatti)
Brayden Krieger	Forward	Canada	Graduation (retired)
Johannes Løkkeberg	Forward	Norway	Signed professional contract (Stavanger Oilers)
Nicholas O'Hanisain	Defenseman	United States	Left program (retired)
Ryan O'Hara	Forward	Canada	Graduation (signed with Greenville Swamp Rabbits)
Owen Ozar	Forward	Canada	Graduation (retired)
Eric Parker	Defenseman	Canada	Graduation (signed with Norfolk Admirals)
Tommy Pasanen	Defenseman	Germany	Graduation (signed with Löwen Frankfurt)
Brandon Santa Juana	Forward	Canada	Transferred to Toronto
Ethan Scardina	Forward	Canada	Graduation (signed with Atlanta Gladiators)
Adam Schankula	Forward	Canada	Transferred to Adrian
Christian Stoever	Goaltender	United States	Graduation (signed with Cardiff Devils)
Ben Wozney	Defenseman	Canada	Graduation (signed with Corsaires de Nantes)

== Recruiting ==
Player	Position	Nationality	Age	Notes
Brayden Crampton	Defenseman	Canada	21	Chilliwack, BC
Ty Higgins	Defenseman	Canada	21	Stratford, ON
Tyler Hotson	Defenseman	Canada	22	Stratford, ON; transfer from Rensselaer
Connor Levis	Forward	Canada	20	Vancouver, BC; selected 210th overall in 2023
Brian Lonergan	Defenseman	United States	19	Montvale, NJ
Jérémie Minville	Forward	United States	21	Drummondville, QC
Noah Morneau	Forward	Canada	21	Riverside, ON
Tyler Palmer	Goaltender	Canada	22	Fernie, BC; transfer from Alberta
Dominik Rymon	Forward	Czech Republic	21	Karlovy Vary, CZE
Tanner Scott	Forward	Canada	21	Sherwood Park, AB
Rihards Simanovičs	Defenseman	Latvia	21	Riga, LAT; transfer from Miami
Jake Sloan	Forward	Canada	21	Leduc County, AB
Jacob Steinman	Goaltender	Canada	21	Cambridge, ON
Brandon Whynott	Forward	Canada	21	Langley, BC

== Roster ==
As of February 28, 2026.

No.	Nat.	Player	Class	Pos	Height	Weight	DoB	Hometown	Previous team	NHL rights
1	(Canada)	Jacob Steinman	Freshman	G	6' 0" (1.83 m)	185 lb (84 kg)	2004-05-23	Cambridge, Ontario	Halifax Mooseheads (QMJHL)	—
3	(Canada)	Ty Higgins	Freshman	D	6' 0" (1.83 m)	188 lb (85 kg)	2004-09-26	Stratford, Ontario	Rouyn-Noranda Huskies (QMJHL)	—
4	(United States)	Brian Lonergan	Freshman	D	5' 11" (1.8 m)	173 lb (78 kg)	2005-12-28	Montvale, New Jersey	Omaha Lancers (USHL)	—
5	(Sweden)	Gustav Stjernberg (A)	Junior	D	6' 4" (1.93 m)	213 lb (97 kg)	2002-10-12	Enebyberg, Sweden	Des Moines Buccaneers (USHL)	—
7	(Latvia)	Rihards Simanovičs	Junior	D	6' 3" (1.91 m)	200 lb (91 kg)	2003-10-07	Riga, Latvia	Miami (NCHC)	—
8	(Canada)	Jérémie Minville	Freshman	F	6' 0" (1.83 m)	190 lb (86 kg)	2004-04-08	Drummondville, Quebec	Gatineau Olympiques (QMJHL)	—
10	(Slovakia)	Adam Žlnka	Sophomore	F	6' 0" (1.83 m)	178 lb (81 kg)	2004-02-28	Detva, Slovakia	Des Moines Buccaneers (USHL)	UTA, 204th overall 2022
11	(Canada)	Noah Morneau	Freshman	F	6' 0" (1.83 m)	183 lb (83 kg)	2004-05-07	Riverside, Ontario	Windsor Spitfires (OHL)	—
12	(United States)	Jackson Niedermayer	Senior	F	6' 0" (1.83 m)	200 lb (91 kg)	2001-03-11	Newport Beach, California	Arizona State (NCAA)	—
13	(Canada)	Brett Pfoh	Senior	F	5' 11" (1.8 m)	187 lb (85 kg)	2002-01-22	Port Moody, British Columbia	Spruce Grove Saints (AJHL)	—
14	(United States)	Dalton Norris (C)	Senior	D	5' 10" (1.78 m)	186 lb (84 kg)	2001-09-28	Oxford, Michigan	Lincoln Stars (USHL)	—
15	(United States)	Max Martin	Sophomore	F	6' 0" (1.83 m)	195 lb (88 kg)	2003-10-02	Tawas City, Michigan	Wisconsin Windigo (NAHL)	—
16	(Canada)	Jake Sloan	Freshman	F	6' 4" (1.93 m)	223 lb (101 kg)	2004-02-13	Leduc County, Alberta	Tri-City Americans (WHL)	—
17	(Canada)	Breck McKinley	Junior	D	5' 9" (1.75 m)	175 lb (79 kg)	2003-10-08	St. Albert, Alberta	Spruce Grove Saints (AJHL)	—
18	(United States)	Quinn Emerson	Senior	F	5' 11" (1.8 m)	186 lb (84 kg)	2001-03-12	Manhattan Beach, California	Wenatchee Wild (BCHL)	—
20	(Canada)	Connor Levis	Freshman	F	6' 2" (1.88 m)	188 lb (85 kg)	2004-10-05	Vancouver, British Columbia	Vancouver Giants (WHL)	WPG, 210th overall 2023
21	(Ukraine)	Ivan Korodiuk	Sophomore	D	6' 4" (1.93 m)	200 lb (91 kg)	2004-01-05	Kyiv, Ukraine	Madison Capitols (USHL)	—
22	(Canada)	Tanner Scott	Freshman	F	5' 9" (1.75 m)	167 lb (76 kg)	2004-05-31	Sherwood Park, Alberta	Saskatoon Blades (WHL)	—
23	(United States)	Ben Doran	Junior	F	5' 11" (1.8 m)	181 lb (82 kg)	2003-02-27	Chesterfield, Missouri	Sioux City Musketeers (USHL)	—
24	(Canada)	Tyler Hotson	Junior	F	6' 0" (1.83 m)	186 lb (84 kg)	2003-03-17	Stratford, Ontario	Rensselaer (ECAC)	—
25	(Canada)	Brayden Crampton	Freshman	D	6' 1" (1.85 m)	177 lb (80 kg)	2004-05-02	Chilliwack, British Columbia	Spokane Chiefs (WHL)	—
26	(United States)	Jack Blake	Senior	D	6' 2" (1.88 m)	189 lb (86 kg)	2001-09-21	Manhattan Beach, California	Oakville Blades (OJHL)	—
27	(Canada)	Brandon Whynott	Freshman	F	6' 2" (1.88 m)	198 lb (90 kg)	2004-04-16	Langley, British Columbia	Tri-City Americans (WHL)	—
28	(United States)	Jaden Grant (A)	Senior	F	6' 2" (1.88 m)	195 lb (88 kg)	2002-09-02	White Lake, Michigan	Youngstown Phantoms (USHL)	—
29	(Canada)	Brody Waters	Junior	F	6' 3" (1.91 m)	207 lb (94 kg)	2002-04-09	Heidelberg, Ontario	Nanaimo Clippers (BCHL)	—
31	(Canada)	Tyler Palmer	Sophomore	G	6' 0" (1.83 m)	194 lb (88 kg)	2003-06-27	Fernie, British Columbia	Alberta (CWUAA)	—
34	(Canada)	Cole Moore	Junior	G	6' 6" (1.98 m)	214 lb (97 kg)	2003-06-04	Toronto, Ontario	Aberdeen Wings (NAHL)	—
77	(Czech Republic)	Dominik Rymon	Freshman	F	5' 10" (1.78 m)	160 lb (73 kg)	2004-05-29	Karlovy Vary, Czech Republic	Everett Silvertips (WHL)	—

== Standings ==
2025–26 Central Collegiate Hockey Association standings
	Conference record										Overall record					
	GP	W	L	T	OTW	OTL	SW	PTS	GF	GA	GP	W	L	T	GF	GA
#14 Minnesota State †*	26	14	7	5	1	2	3	51	71	53	40	22	11	7	111	81
#18 St. Thomas	26	15	7	4	2	1	2	50	89	67	38	21	12	5	131	109
#17 Augustana	26	14	8	4	1	2	3	50	72	49	37	22	11	4	109	74
Michigan Tech	26	16	7	3	3	1	0	49	84	59	39	23	13	3	126	106
Bowling Green	26	15	7	4	3	2	1	49	80	59	36	18	11	7	107	88
Bemidji State	26	11	11	4	5	1	3	36	69	68	36	13	19	4	98	103
Lake Superior State	26	8	16	2	1	4	2	31	57	83	36	11	22	3	92	121
Ferris State	26	6	18	2	1	2	1	22	70	100	37	8	27	2	91	138
Northern Michigan	26	3	21	2	0	2	0	13	44	98	34	3	29	2	56	132
Championship: March 20, 2026 † indicates conference regular-season champion (MacNaughton Cup) * indicates conference tournament champion (Mason Cup); Rankings: USCHO.com Top 20 Poll; updated March 22, 2026; Source: CCHA

== Schedule and results ==
Date	Time	Opponent^{#}	Rank^{#}	Site	TV	Decision	Result	Attendance	Record
Exhibition
October 4	6:07 pm	Robert Morris*		Slater Family Ice Arena • Bowling Green, Ohio (Exhibition)	FloHockey		L 1–4		
Regular Season
October 10	6:00 pm	at Niagara*		Dwyer Arena • Lewiston, New York	Midco Sports+	Moore	L 0–2	609	0–1–0
October 11	5:00 pm	at Niagara*		Dwyer Arena • Lewiston, New York	FloHockey	Moore	L 2–5	887	0–2–0
October 17	7:07 pm	Windsor*		Slater Family Ice Arena • Bowling Green, Ohio (Exhibition)	Midco Sports+	Palmer	W 6–3	3,303	
October 24	7:07 pm	at Lake Superior State		Taffy Abel Arena • Sault Ste. Marie, Michigan	Midco Sports+	Palmer	W 4–1	—	1–2–0 (1–0–0)
October 25	7:07 pm	at Lake Superior State		Taffy Abel Arena • Sault Ste. Marie, Michigan	Midco Sports+	Steinman	W 3–2	1,104	2–2–0 (2–0–0)
October 31	7:07 pm	Bemidji State		Slater Family Ice Arena • Bowling Green, Ohio	Midco Sports+	Palmer	T 4–4 ^{SOL}	1,863	2–2–1 (2–0–1)
November 1	6:07 pm	Bemidji State		Slater Family Ice Arena • Bowling Green, Ohio	Midco Sports+	Steinman	L 2–3 ^{OT}	2,189	2–3–1 (2–1–1)
November 7	8:07 pm	at #16 Minnesota State		Mayo Clinic Health System Event Center • Mankato, Minnesota	Midco Sports+	Steinman	T 4–4 ^{SOL}	3,745	2–3–2 (2–1–2)
November 8	8:07 pm	at #16 Minnesota State		Mayo Clinic Health System Event Center • Mankato, Minnesota	Midco Sports+	Steinman	T 1–1 ^{SOW}	4,119	2–3–3 (2–1–3)
November 14	7:07 pm	Ferris State		Slater Family Ice Arena • Bowling Green, Ohio	Midco Sports+	Steinman	W 9–5	2,369	3–3–3 (3–1–3)
November 15	6:07 pm	Ferris State		Slater Family Ice Arena • Bowling Green, Ohio	Midco Sports+	Palmer	W 5–2	2,835	4–3–3 (4–1–3)
November 21	8:07 pm	at St. Thomas		Lee & Penny Anderson Arena • Saint Paul, Minnesota	Midco Sports+	Steinman	W 3–2 ^{OT}	2,127	5–3–3 (5–1–3)
November 22	8:07 pm	at St. Thomas		Lee & Penny Anderson Arena • Saint Paul, Minnesota	Midco Sports+	Steinman	L 2–6	2,485	5–4–3 (5–2–3)
November 28	7:07 pm	Princeton*		Slater Family Ice Arena • Bowling Green, Ohio	Midco Sports+	Palmer	W 4–1	3,135	6–4–3
November 29	6:07 pm	Princeton*		Slater Family Ice Arena • Bowling Green, Ohio	Midco Sports+	Steinman	W 4–3	1,619	7–4–3
December 5	7:07 pm	Northern Michigan		Slater Family Ice Arena • Bowling Green, Ohio	Midco Sports+	Palmer	L 2–3	2,589	7–5–3 (5–3–3)
December 6	6:07 pm	Northern Michigan		Slater Family Ice Arena • Bowling Green, Ohio	Midco Sports+	Steinman	W 4–3 ^{OT}	2,103	8–5–3 (6–3–3)
December 29	6:07 pm	USNTDP*		Slater Family Ice Arena • Bowling Green, Ohio (Exhibition)	Midco Sports+		W 6–1		
January 2	6:30 pm	at Ohio State*		Value City Arena • Columbus, Ohio	BTN+	Moore	T 2–2 ^{OT}	5,779	8–5–4
January 3	6:07 pm	Ohio State*		Slater Family Ice Arena • Bowling Green, Ohio	Midco Sports+	Moore	W 5–3	5,000	9–5–4
January 9	7:07 pm	at Ferris State		Ewigleben Arena • Big Rapids, Michigan	Midco Sports+	Moore	W 3–1	1,128	10–5–4 (7–3–3)
January 10	7:07 pm	at Ferris State		Ewigleben Arena • Big Rapids, Michigan	Midco Sports+	Steinman	W 5–1	1,318	11–5–4 (8–3–3)
January 16	7:07 pm	Lake Superior State		Slater Family Ice Arena • Bowling Green, Ohio	Midco Sports+	Moore	W 3–1	3,303	12–5–4 (9–3–3)
January 17	7:07 pm	Lake Superior State		Slater Family Ice Arena • Bowling Green, Ohio	Midco Sports+	Steinman	L 0–1	3,367	12–6–4 (9–4–3)
January 23	8:07 pm	at Bemidji State		Sanford Center • Bemidji, Minnesota	Midco Sports+	Moore	W 3–1	1,727	13–6–4 (10–4–3)
January 24	8:07 pm	at Bemidji State		Sanford Center • Bemidji, Minnesota	Midco Sports+	Steinman	W 5–1	1,888	14–6–4 (11–4–3)
January 30	7:00 pm	at Notre Dame*		Compton Family Ice Arena • Notre Dame, Indiana	Peacock	Moore	T 3–3 ^{OT}	5,063	14–6–5
January 31	6:07 pm	Notre Dame*		Slater Family Ice Arena • Bowling Green, Ohio	Midco Sports+	Steinman	T 2–2 ^{OT}	5,000	14–6–6
February 6	7:07 pm	#15 St. Thomas		Slater Family Ice Arena • Bowling Green, Ohio	Midco Sports+	Moore	L 2–3 ^{OT}	3,167	14–7–6 (11–5–3)
February 7	6:07 pm	#15 St. Thomas		Slater Family Ice Arena • Bowling Green, Ohio	Midco Sports+	Steinman	W 3–1	3,403	15–7–6 (12–5–3)
February 13	8:07 pm	at #18 Augustana		Midco Arena • Sioux Falls, South Dakota	Midco Sports+	Moore	W 1–0	2,801	16–7–6 (13–5–3)
February 14	8:07 pm	at #18 Augustana		Midco Arena • Sioux Falls, South Dakota	Midco Sports+	Palmer	L 2–4	2,677	16–8–6 (13–6–3)
February 20	7:07 pm	#17 Minnesota State		Slater Family Ice Arena • Bowling Green, Ohio	Midco Sports+	Moore	L 4–5	3,262	16–9–6 (13–7–3)
February 21	6:07 pm	#17 Minnesota State		Slater Family Ice Arena • Bowling Green, Ohio	Midco Sports+	Moore	T 1–1 ^{SOL}	4,317	16–9–7 (13–7–4)
February 27	7:07 pm	at #16 Michigan Tech		MacInnes Student Ice Arena • Houghton, Michigan	Midco Sports+	Palmer	W 1–0	3,351	17–9–7 (14–7–4)
February 28	7:07 pm	at #16 Michigan Tech		MacInnes Student Ice Arena • Houghton, Michigan	Midco Sports+	Palmer	W 4–3 ^{OT}	3,551	18–9–7 (15–7–4)
CCHA Tournament
March 6	7:07 pm	at #20 Michigan Tech*		MacInnes Student Ice Arena • Houghton, Michigan (CCHA Quarterfinal Game 1)	Midco Sports+	Palmer	L 3–5	2,836	18–10–7
March 7	6:07 pm	at #20 Michigan Tech*		MacInnes Student Ice Arena • Houghton, Michigan (CCHA Quarterfinal Game 2)	Midco Sports+	Moore	L 2–3	3,160	18–11–7
*Non-conference game. ^{#}Rankings from USCHO.com Poll. All times are in Eastern Time. Source:

== Scoring statistics ==
Name	Position	Games	Goals	Assists	Points	PIM
Quinn Emerson	C/RW	36	10	23	33	28
Ben Doran	F	36	7	24	31	40
Tyler Hotson	F	36	12	16	28	39
Breck McKinley	D	36	2	24	26	16
Dominik Rymon	C/LW	36	11	11	22	14
Brayden Crampton	D	35	3	15	18	29
Jackson Niedermayer	D	32	5	12	17	14
Noah Morneau	LW	30	9	6	15	14
Brody Waters	LW	36	7	8	15	10
Dalton Norris	D	27	1	12	13	16
Jaden Grant	F	35	8	4	12	34
Brett Pfoh	F	24	6	5	11	12
Ty Higgins	D	21	1	10	11	22
Gustav Stjernberg	D	25	6	4	10	98
Jérémie Minville	C	33	5	5	10	23
Max Martin	F	26	3	6	9	12
Jake Sloan	C/RW	32	2	5	7	10
Connor Levis	C	31	4	1	5	6
Brandon Whynott	F	28	2	2	4	4
Ivan Korodiuk	D	30	1	3	4	25
Adam Žlnka	C/W	14	1	1	2	2
Jack Blake	D	16	0	2	2	4
Rihards Simanovičs	D	24	1	0	1	0
Tanner Scott	F	4	0	0	0	0
Brian Lonergan	D	4	0	0	0	2
Tyler Palmer	G	11	0	0	0	0
Cole Moore	G	14	0	0	0	0
Jacob Steinman	G	15	0	0	0	0
Total			107	199	306	480

== Goaltending statistics ==
Name	Games	Minutes	Wins	Losses	Ties	Goals Against	Saves	Shut Outs	SV %	GAA
Jacob Steinman	16	843:03	8	3	3	30	352	0	.921	2.14
Tyler Palmer	11	560:40	5	3	1	22	195	1	.899	2.35
Cole Moore	14	784:09	5	5	3	31	324	1	.913	2.37
Empty Net	-	18:44	-	-	-	5	-	-	-	-
Total	36	2206:08	18	11	7	88	871	2	.904	2.39

== Rankings ==
Poll	Week																											
Poll	Pre	1	2	3	4	5	6	7	8	9	10	11	12	13	14	15	16	17	18	19	20	21	22	23	24	25	26	27 (Final)
USCHO.com	RV	NR	NR	NR	NR	NR	NR	NR	NR	RV	NR	NR	–	NR	RV	RV	NR	RV	RV	RV	RV	RV	RV	NR	RV			
USA Hockey	RV	NR	NR	NR	NR	NR	NR	NR	NR	RV	NR	NR	–	NR	NR	RV	NR	RV	RV	RV	20	RV	RV	RV	NR			

Note: USCHO did not release a poll in week 12.
Note: USA Hockey did not release a poll in week 12.
