= Wave Machines =

English art pop band

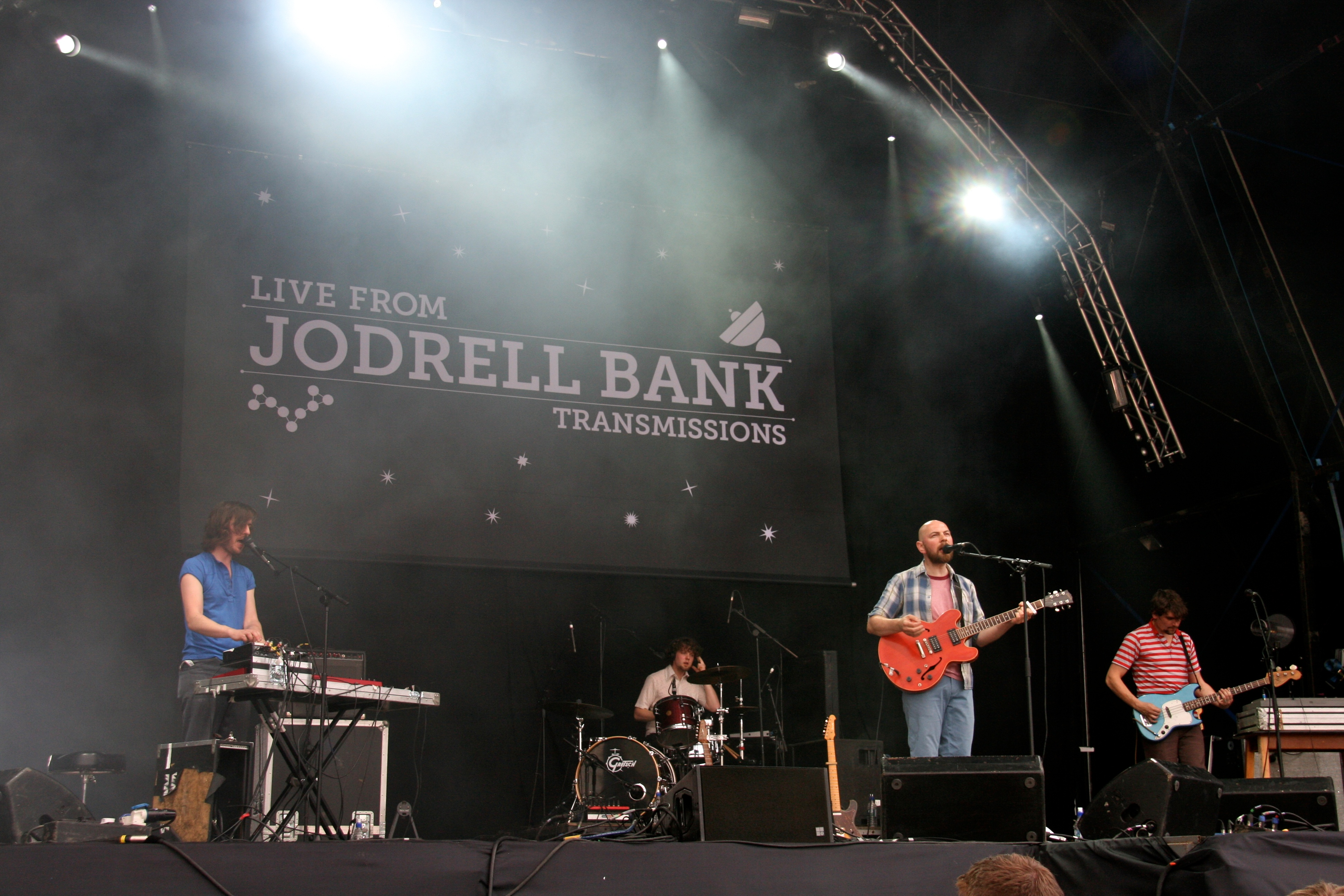
- Wave Machines performing at Jodrell Bank Live on 2 July 2011

Background information
- Origin: Liverpool, England
- Genres: Art pop, indietronica, indie pop
- Years active: 2007–2014
- Labels: Neapolitan, Chess Club Records
- Members: Timothy Bruzon; Carl Brown; James Walsh; Vidar Norheim
- Website: http://www.wavemachines.co.uk

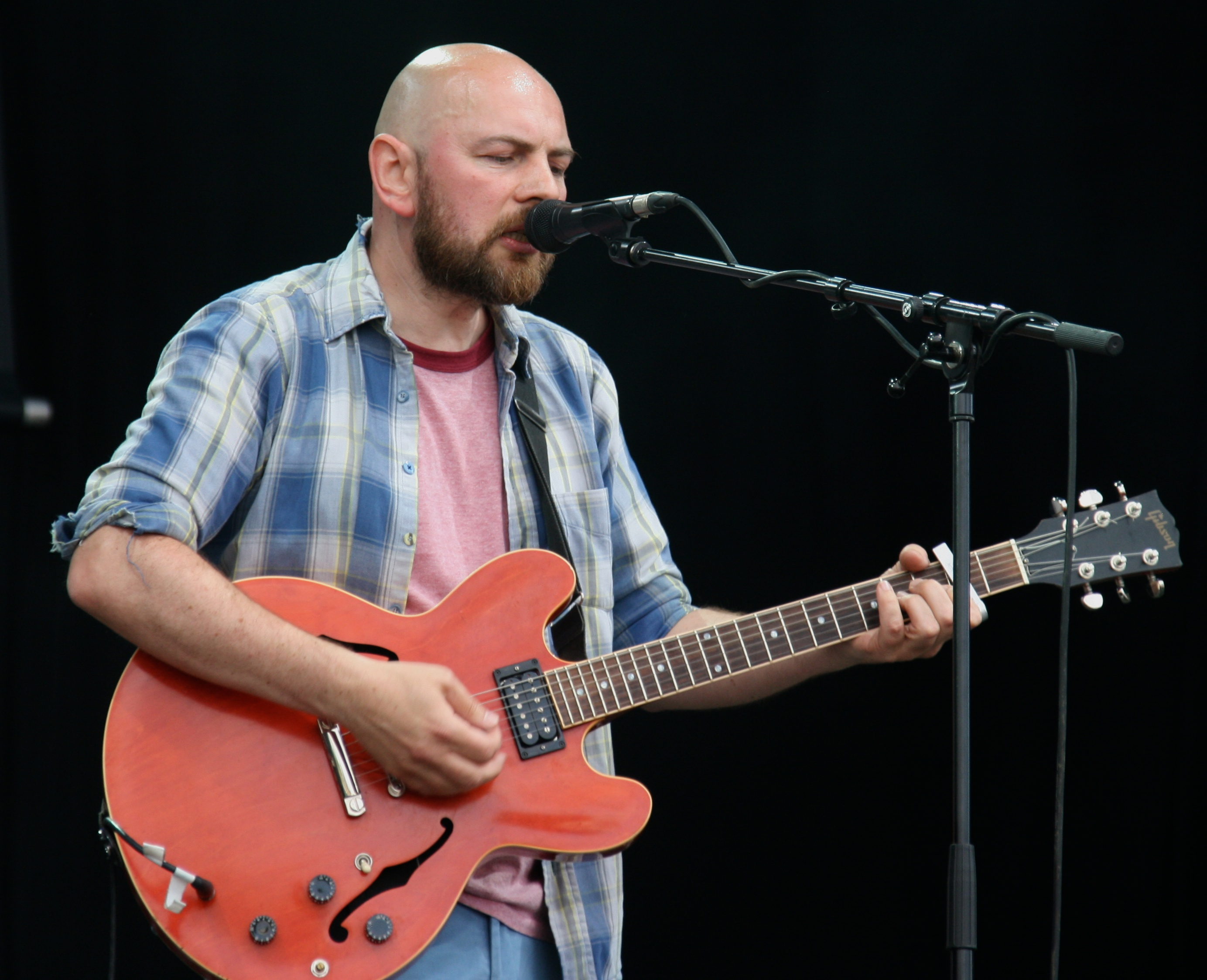
Guitarist Carl Brown performing at Jodrell Bank Live

Wave Machines was an English art pop band formed in Liverpool in 2007. The band released singles "The Greatest Escape We Ever Made" and "I Go I Go I Go" on Chess Club Records before signing with Neapolitan Music Limited in 2008. Three further singles, "Keep The Lights On", a newly recorded version of "I Go I Go I Go" and "Punk Spirit" followed.

The band's debut album Wave If You're Really There was released in June 2009. It received favourable reviews from NME. Clash (magazine) and Artrocker (magazine)

The group has performed a number of live sessions on BBC 6 Music on shows presented by Lauren Laverne, George Lamb and Marc Riley, as well as sessions on other stations for Huw Stephens, John Kennedy and Rob da Bank.

The band performed live at Jodrell Bank Observatory for Jodrell Bank Live on 2 July 2011 alongside The Flaming Lips and British Sea Power.

Wave Machines won the 9th annual Independent Music Awards Vox Pop vote for best Dance/Electronica song "Keep the Lights On". The video for "Keep The Lights On" was awarded best choreography at the 2011 UK Music Video Awards.

On 28 April 2012 the band revealed a taster from their forthcoming album Pollen called "Counting Birds" via their website.

On 22 October 2012, the first single from Pollen, "Ill Fit", was released and followed by the announcement that the album would be released on 21 January 2013. The album was recorded throughout 2011/12 at various locations starting at Sphere Studios in Battersea before relocating to Liverpool to continue at band's rehearsal room and eventually Whitewood studios. Pollen was co-produced by Lexxx. It was later mixed by Lexxx at Konk studios in Hornsey, North London.

Since dissolving Wave Machines, Tim Bruzon has worked as a writer and mixer on two albums for Belgian duo Arsenal, "Furu" (2014) and "In The Rush Of Shaking Shoulders" (2018) and plays in their live band. He also writes music for film. Vidar Norheim (drums) has released the EP, Blind Carbon Copy, with his solo project on Furuberget in Norway, Rallye Label in Japan and independently worldwide.

== Band members ==
Current members

- Tim Bruzon - lead vocals, rhythm guitar, keyboards, synthesiser, programming (2007–2014)
- Carl Bown - lead guitar, keyboards, synth, vocals (2007–2014)
- James Walsh - bass, synthesiser, samples, programming, percussion, clarinet, vocals (2007–2014)
- Vidar Norheim - drums, malletkat, vocals (2007–2014)

== Discography ==
=== Albums ===
- Wave If You're Really There (Neapolitan, 15 Jun 2009)
- Pollen (Neapolitan, 21 Jan 2013)

=== Singles ===
- "I Go I Go I Go" (Chess Club, 23 Jun 2008)
- "The Greatest Escape We Ever Made" (Chess Club, 27 Oct 2008)
- "Keep the Lights on" (Neapolitan, 27 April 2009)
- "I Go I Go I Go" (Neapolitan, 8 Jun 2009)
- "Punk Spirit" (Neapolitan, 7 Sep 2009)
- "Counting Birds" (Neapolitan, 23 April 2012)
- "Ill Fit" (Neapolitan, 10 October 2012)
