= Volumfestivalen =

- Genre: Music; Literature; Theatre; Film; Art
- Dates: 4 days in June (Thursday - Sunday)
- Locations: Elverum in Hedmark, Norway
- Years active: 2003-2018
- Founders: Sverre Houmb Morten Budeng Silvie Westvang

Volumfestivalen was a cultural festival held in Elverum Municipality in Hedmark county, Norway. It contained music, literature, art, performing arts and film. The festival was first held in 2003. The last festival was held in June 2018. It was cancelled due to years of decrease in ticket sales. The festival provided a venue for both the student, emerging and professional artists and cultural mediators linked to Hedmark. Past acts at Volumfestivalen include: The Wombats, Cezinando, Unge Ferrari, Kristian Kristensen, Team Me, Ludvig Moon, Frida Ånnevik and Ingrid Olava.

The festival was run voluntarily by young people from around the Hedmark area. In 2010, Volumfestivalen received the Elverum Municipality Culture award.

== Events ==
Volumfestivalen was held in Elvarheim Park and about ten other venues in the center of Elverum. The festival started in 2003 and since 2009 it became an annual event. In 2011 the festival had about 1,600 visitors, and in 2012 it passed 2000 visitors.

The festival also accommodated seminars, a trade fair and a separate category for children.

== Key people in 2012 ==
- Chairman : Henry Leeves
- Director : Sven Arild Storberget
- Economy: Lars-Ivar Hoelstad
