= Ludvig Moon =

Norwegian pop rock band

- Origin: Oslo, Norway
- Genres: Pop, Rock, indie pop
- Years active: 2012–2020
- Labels: Riot Factory; Rallye Label (Japan)
- Members: Anders Magnor Killerud; Ole Torstein Hovig; Herman K. Hulleberg; Kristofer Staxrud; Andreas Andre Myrvold; Lydia Popkema; Simen Sandbæk Skari
- Past members: Thomas Meidell; Jørgen Nordby; Håkon Brunborg Kjenstad; Eirik Kirkemyr
- Website: www.ludvigmoon.com

Ludvig Moon was a pop-rock band from Oslo, Norway. The band started as a solo act in 2012 when Anders Magnor Killerud left Spellemannprisen-winning pop band Team Me to pursue his own music. The band released their first songs on NRK Urørt. It was with these songs that they earned Urørt Ukas (Song of the Week) title on the NRK Urørt website. In 2014 they released their first EP which was self-titled. They released their debut studio album Kin in October 2016, and their second and final album, Vanilla, in May 2020.

== Formation and early work (2012–2015) ==
Ludvig Moon made their concert debut in Oslo at the Gut Feelings festival in 2012. In 2013 the Norwegian indie record label, Furuberget released the bands' three song EP Summer Glow-fi for free on the music sharing website, bandcamp. It was this EP that earned Ludvig Moon the Urørt Ukas (Song of the week) title on NRK Urørt, which is a part of the Norwegian Broadcasting channel P3, with their song "Uneasy".

Later in 2013 Ludvig Moon signed to Rallye Label in Japan and Riot Factory in Norway and released their self-titled EP in 2014, first in Japan, then in Norway and later worldwide. The album received many good reviews in leading Scandinavian publications. They received a 4 out of 6 in Gaffa Norway. and were also featured in Under Dusken and on Norwegian radio.

After the release of the EP, Ludvig Moon went on a Norway-wide tour supporting Team Me. The band stood out in 2015 at By:Larm festival and conference in Oslo by performing two concerts in one night at Verkstedet and then later the same night at John Dee. In 2015 the EP won frontman, Killerud, the Volumfestivalen Stipend, an award given to talented and promising musicians from Hedmark, Norway.

== Kin and Vanilla (2016–2020) ==
In October 2016 Ludvig Moon released their debut studio album Kin worldwide with major releases in both digital and physical media in Norway and Japan. The album has been featured in Norwegian and Japanese media.

Leading up to the album release, the band released 3 singles. Cult Baby and a double A-side single, Sparks/Houses At Night. Cult Baby was released with a music video directed by Norwegian director/artist/musician Simen Sandbæk Skari who later joined the band before the album was released and who also designed and created the artwork for Kin as well as the CD/vinyl releases.

In November 2016, Ludvig Moon played their first concert outside of Norway at the DNA (Discover New Artists) showcase in Berlin, Germany. The band played 2 showcases at the Norwegian music conference and festival, Trondheim Calling in February 2017.

In May 2020, the band released their second studio album, Vanilla.

== Members ==
- Anders Magnor Killerud – lead vocals, guitar
- Ole Torstein Hovig – synths
- Herman K. Hulleberg – guitar
- Kristofer Staxrud – Drums
- Andreas Andre Myrvold – bass, vocals
- Lydia Popkema – vocals, guitar, tambourine
- Simen Sandbæk Skari – Therevox, vocals, tambourine

== Awards ==
Volumfestivalen Stipend 2015
NRK P3 Urørt Ukas 2013 - Song of the Week

== Discography ==
=== Albums ===
- Kin (2016)
- Vanilla (2020)

=== EPs ===
- EP (2014)
- Summer Glow-fi (2013)
