= Vidar Norheim =

Norwegian musician

Vidar Norheim (born 13 October 1981) is a Norwegian drummer, multi-instrumentalist and songwriter.

Born in Molde, Norheim started drumming as one of the original members of the jazz group DIXI in 1996. He is also a graduate of the Liverpool Institute for Performing Arts, where he specialized in songwriting. In 2004 he also joined a Liverpool-based band which eventually became Wave Machines, which has toured in England, the USA and Norway and in June 2009 released its debut album Wave If You're Really There. Norheim has lived in Liverpool since 2002 and is married to the Liverpudlian singer-songwriter and playwright Lizzie Nunnery, with whom he has collaborated on several album releases.

On 12 August 2011 he was nominated for a prize at the Trondheim Calling music festival. In November 2016 he released his first solo EP on Furuberget.
