= 2025–26 Lake Superior State Lakers men's ice hockey season =

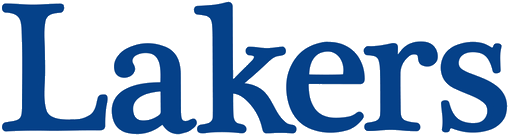
- Conference: 7th CCHA
- Home ice: Taffy Abel Arena

Rankings
- USCHO: NR
- USA Hockey: NR

Record
- Overall: 11–22–3
- Conference: 8–16–2
- Home: 3–11–2
- Road: 8–9–1
- Neutral: 0–2–0

Coaches and captains
- Head coach: Damon Whitten
- Assistant coaches: Mike York; D. J. Goldstein; Ryan Shelley
- Captain(s): Connor Milburn; Sasha Teleguine
- Alternate captain(s): Mike Brown; Evan Bushy

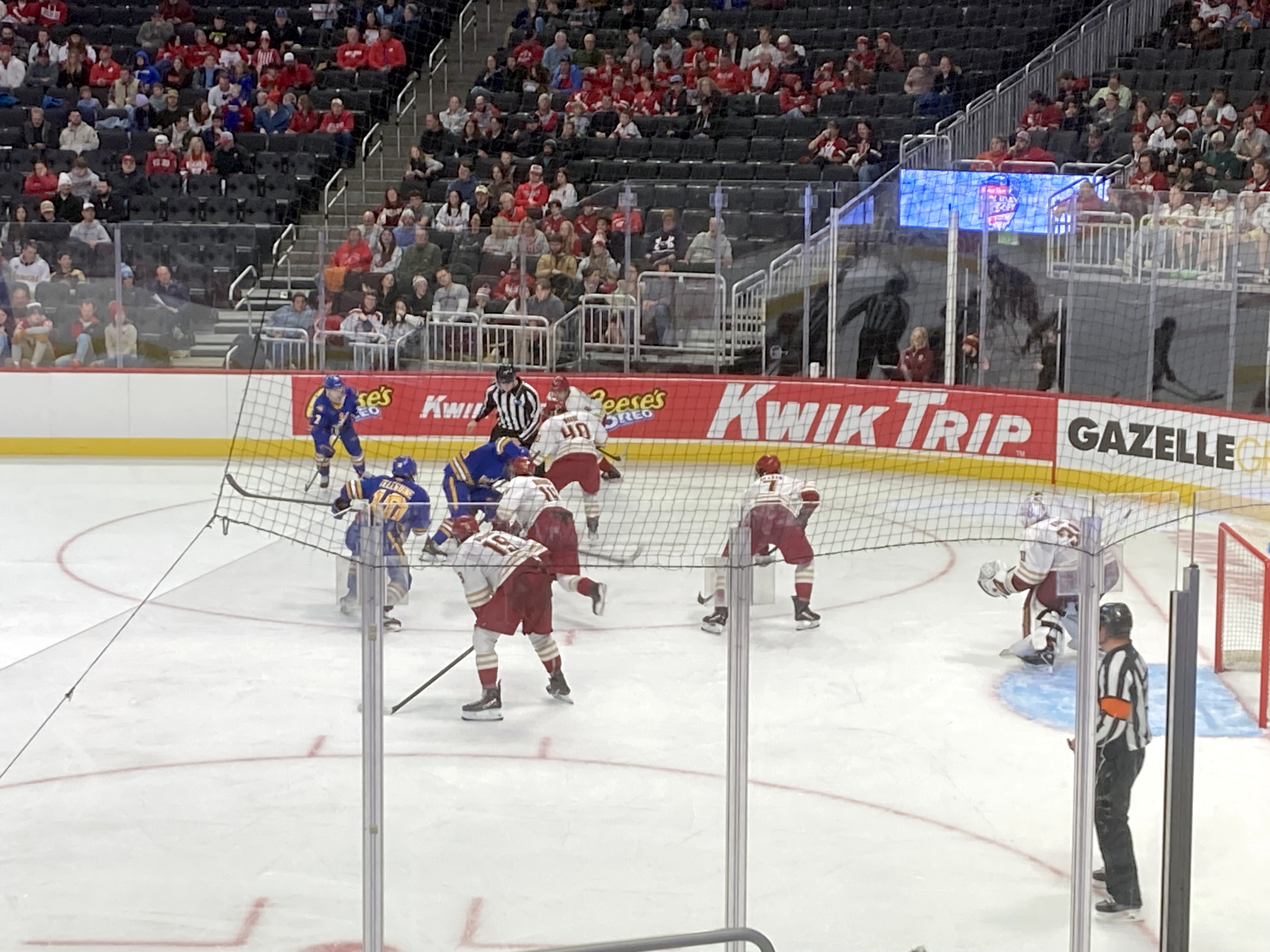
Lake Superior State playing Boston College during the 2025 Holiday Face–Off in Milwaukee

The 2025–26 Lake Superior State Lakers men's ice hockey season was the 60th season of play for the program, the 53rd at the Division I level and the 46th in the CCHA. The Lakers represented Lake Superior State University, played their home games at the Taffy Abel Arena and were coached by Damon Whitten in his 12th season.

== Season ==
This season essentially saw the Lakers' hockey program tread water. The team produced nearly the same record they had the year before while also averaging approximate offensive and defensive numbers as well. Even with eleven new faces on the roster, LSSU had little progression to show. This was not to say that the Lakers did not have their moments during the year. Just after Thanksgiving, Lake Superior posted victories over both Augustana and St. Thomas (two teams who finished the year ranked in the top 20). However, the team was hamstrung by its inability to find any kind of consistency. Only three times were the Lakers able to win back-to-back games and all three occasions came while they were playing some of the worst teams in college hockey (Stonehill and Northern Michigan). The Lakers had some pushback in the postseason, forcing St. Thomas into overtime in the first match, but this season was largely forgettable for Lake Superior.

== Departures ==
Player	Position	Nationality	Cause
Timo Bakos	Forward	Germany	Graduation (signed with Nürnberg Ice Tigers)
Tyler Bute	Goaltender	United States	Returned to club team
Jacob Conrad	Defenseman	United States	Transferred to Minnesota State
Cole Craft	Forward	Canada	Graduate transfer to Guelph
Easton Hesse	Goaltender	Canada	Graduate transfer to Bentley
Grant Hindman	Defenseman	United States	Graduation (signed with Iowa Heartlanders)
Grant Riley	Goaltender	United States	Left program (retired)
Nate Schweitzer	Defenseman	United States	Graduation (signed with Maine Mariners)
Dawson Tritt	Forward	United States	Graduation (signed with Greenville Swamp Rabbits)
Jordan Venegoni	Forward	United States	Graduation (signed with Peoria Rivermen)
Joshua Wildauer	Forward	United States	Graduation (retired)

== Recruiting ==
Player	Position	Nationality	Age	Notes
Luke Antonacci	Defenseman	United States	22	Princeton, NJ; transfer from Maine
Ryan Beck	Forward	United States	23	Linden, MI; transfer from Colorado College
Sam Bélanger	Defenseman	Canada	21	Montréal, QC
Tyson Galloway	Defenseman	Canada	22	Kamloops, BC; transfer from Calgary; selected 145th overall in 2021
Calem Mangone	Forward	United States	20	Sault Ste. Marie, ON
Adam Manji	Goaltender	Canada	22	New Westminster, BC; transfer from American International
Matheson Mason	Forward	Canada	20	Toronto, ON
Andrew Oke	Goaltender	United States	21	Shelby Township, MI
Max Ranström	Defenseman	Sweden	20	Filipstad, SWE
Hunter Ramos	Forward	United States	20	Fort Wayne, IN
Pierson Sobush	Forward	Canada	21	Sudbury, ON

== Roster ==
As of September 16, 2025.

No.	Nat.	Player	Class	Pos	Height	Weight	DoB	Hometown	Previous team	NHL rights
2	(Sweden)	Max Ranström	Freshman	D	5' 11" (1.8 m)	192 lb (87 kg)	2004-12-21	Filipstad, Sweden	Corpus Christi IceRays (NAHL)	—
3	(United States)	Mike Brown (A)	Senior (RS)	D	6' 2" (1.88 m)	202 lb (92 kg)	2001-04-03	Belmont, Massachusetts	Merrimack (HEA)	—
4	(United States)	Luke Antonacci	Senior	D	5' 9" (1.75 m)	171 lb (78 kg)	2002-11-26	Princeton, New Jersey	Maine (HEA)	—
5	(United States)	Evan Bushy (A)	Junior	D	6' 1" (1.85 m)	195 lb (88 kg)	2002-03-26	Mankato, Minnesota	Trail Smoke Eaters (BCHL)	—
6	(Canada)	Adam Barone	Sophomore	D	6' 1" (1.85 m)	174 lb (79 kg)	2004-05-06	Sault Ste. Marie, Ontario	Trail Smoke Eaters (BCHL)	—
7	(Canada)	Calem Mangone	Freshman	F	5' 9" (1.75 m)	165 lb (75 kg)	2004-11-04	Sault Ste. Marie, Ontario	Saginaw Spirit (OHL)	—
8	(United States)	Jack Blanchett	Junior	F	5' 11" (1.8 m)	185 lb (84 kg)	2003-05-12	Monroe, Michigan	Powell River Kings (BCHL)	—
10	(United States)	Sasha Teleguine (C)	Senior	F	5' 10" (1.78 m)	180 lb (82 kg)	2002-09-17	North Attleborough, Massachusetts	Chilliwack Chiefs (BCHL)	—
11	(United States)	Carter Batchelder	Junior	F	5' 10" (1.78 m)	175 lb (79 kg)	2003-02-25	Savage, Minnesota	Des Moines Buccaneers (USHL)	—
13	(United States)	Wilson Dahlheimer	Sophomore	F	5' 9" (1.75 m)	172 lb (78 kg)	2003-10-09	Monticello, Minnesota	Muskegon Lumberjacks (USHL)	—
15	(Canada)	Sam Bélanger	Freshman	D	6' 4" (1.93 m)	229 lb (104 kg)	2004-05-31	Montréal, Quebec	Cranbrook Bucks (BCHL)	—
17	(United States)	Luke Levandowski	Junior	F	6' 0" (1.83 m)	165 lb (75 kg)	2002-09-26	Rosemount, Minnesota	Wisconsin Windigo (NAHL)	—
18	(United States)	Everett Pietila	Sophomore	F	5' 10" (1.78 m)	185 lb (84 kg)	2003-09-27	Howell, Michigan	Wisconsin Windigo (NAHL)	—
19	(Canada)	Connor Milburn (C)	Senior	F	6' 4" (1.93 m)	180 lb (82 kg)	2001-04-11	Kamloops, British Columbia	Chilliwack Chiefs (BCHL)	—
21	(Canada)	Tyson Galloway	Sophomore	D	6' 4" (1.93 m)	205 lb (93 kg)	2003-01-20	Kamloops, British Columbia	Calgary (CWUAA)	STL, 145th overall 2021
22	(Canada)	Reagan Milburn	Junior	F	6' 0" (1.83 m)	190 lb (86 kg)	2003-02-13	Kamloops, British Columbia	Vernon Vipers (BCHL)	—
25	(United States)	Ryan Beck	Senior	F	5' 10" (1.78 m)	198 lb (90 kg)	2002-08-25	Linden, Michigan	Colorado College (NCHC)	—
26	(Canada)	John Herrington	Junior	D	5' 11" (1.8 m)	180 lb (82 kg)	2002-04-19	Hudson's Hope, British Columbia	Prince George Spruce Kings (BCHL)	—
28	(United States)	Hunter Ramos	Freshman	F	5' 9" (1.75 m)	161 lb (73 kg)	2005-05-09	Fort Wayne, Indiana	Waterloo Black Hawks (USHL)	—
29	(United States)	Andrew Oke	Freshman	G	6' 2" (1.88 m)	194 lb (88 kg)	2004-03-26	Shelby Township, Michigan	Saginaw Spirit (OHL)	—
33	(Canada)	Rorke Applebee	Sophomore	G	6' 0" (1.83 m)	170 lb (77 kg)	2003-09-19	Châteauguay, Quebec	West Kelowna Warriors (BCHL)	—
40	(United States)	Bryan Huggins	Senior	D	5' 11" (1.8 m)	180 lb (82 kg)	2002-03-26	Grand Rapids, Michigan	Fargo Force (USHL)	—
41	(Sweden)	William Ahlrik	Sophomore	F	6' 0" (1.83 m)	190 lb (86 kg)	2003-09-25	Tidaholm, Sweden	Oklahoma Warriors (NAHL)	—
43	(United States)	Hadley Hudak	Sophomore	F	6' 4" (1.93 m)	201 lb (91 kg)	2003-06-23	Canton, Michigan	Springfield Jr. Blues (NAHL)	—
53	(United States)	Johnny Druskinis	Junior	D	6' 1" (1.85 m)	185 lb (84 kg)	2002-04-10	Plymouth, Michigan	Michigan (Big Ten)	—
73	(Canada)	Adam Manji	Sophomore	G	6' 5" (1.96 m)	181 lb (82 kg)	2003-07-10	New Westminster, British Columbia	American International (AHA)	—
77	(United States)	Branden Piku	Junior	F	5' 8" (1.73 m)	165 lb (75 kg)	2002-08-25	Harrison Township, Michigan	Maryland Black Bears (NAHL)	—
81	(United States)	Blake Humphrey	Senior	F	5' 8" (1.73 m)	162 lb (73 kg)	2002-01-18	Syracuse, New York	Sacred Heart (AHA)	—
91	(Canada)	Pierson Sobush	Freshman	F	5' 9" (1.75 m)	170 lb (77 kg)	2004-06-07	Sudbury, Ontario	Corpus Christi IceRays (NAHL)	—
97	(Canada)	Matheson Mason	Freshman	F	6' 0" (1.83 m)	179 lb (81 kg)	2004-12-08	Toronto, Ontario	Spruce Grove Saints (BCHL)	—

== Standings ==
2025–26 Central Collegiate Hockey Association standings
	Conference record										Overall record					
	GP	W	L	T	OTW	OTL	SW	PTS	GF	GA	GP	W	L	T	GF	GA
#16 Minnesota State †	26	14	7	5	1	2	3	51	71	53	37	20	10	7	99	75
#18 St. Thomas	26	15	7	4	2	1	2	50	89	67	36	20	11	5	128	104
#13 Augustana	26	14	8	4	1	2	3	50	72	49	36	22	10	4	108	72
#19 Michigan Tech	26	16	7	3	3	1	0	49	84	59	38	23	12	3	124	99
Bowling Green	26	15	7	4	3	2	1	49	80	59	36	18	11	7	107	88
Bemidji State	26	11	11	4	5	1	3	36	69	68	36	13	19	4	98	103
Lake Superior State	26	8	16	2	1	4	2	31	57	83	36	11	22	3	92	121
Ferris State	26	6	18	2	1	2	1	22	70	100	37	8	27	2	91	138
Northern Michigan	26	3	21	2	0	2	0	13	44	98	34	3	29	2	56	132
Championship: March 20, 2026 † indicates conference regular-season champion (MacNaughton Cup) * indicates conference tournament champion (Mason Cup); Rankings: USCHO.com Top 20 Poll; updated March 8, 2026; Source: CCHA

== Schedule and results ==
Date	Time	Opponent^{#}	Rank^{#}	Site	TV	Decision	Result	Attendance	Record
Regular Season
October 4	4:30 pm	at Stonehill*		Warrior Ice Arena • Boston, Massachusetts	NEC Front Row	Applebee	W 5–3	300	1–0–0
October 5	3:00 pm	at Stonehill*		Warrior Ice Arena • Boston, Massachusetts	NEC Front Row	Oke	W 3–2	215	2–0–0
October 10	7:07 pm	Lindenwood*		Taffy Abel Arena • Sault Ste. Marie, Michigan	Midco Sports+	Oke	L 4–7	—	2–1–0
October 11	6:07 pm	Lindenwood*		Taffy Abel Arena • Sault Ste. Marie, Michigan	Midco Sports+	Applebee	L 4–5	2,000	2–2–0
October 17	7:00 pm	at USNTDP*		USA Hockey Arena • Plymouth, Michigan (Exhibition)		Applebee	W 6–2		
October 18	3:30 pm	vs. Simon Fraser*		USA Hockey Arena • Plymouth, Michigan (Exhibition)		Applebee	W 3–2		
October 24	7:07 pm	Bowling Green		Taffy Abel Arena • Sault Ste. Marie, Michigan	Midco Sports+	Applebee	L 1–4	—	2–3–0 (0–1–0)
October 25	6:07 pm	Bowling Green		Taffy Abel Arena • Sault Ste. Marie, Michigan	Midco Sports+	Oke	L 2–3	1,104	2–4–0 (0–2–0)
October 31	7:00 pm	at St. Lawrence*		Appleton Arena • Canton, New York	ESPN+	Oke	T 3–3 ^{OT}	510	2–4–1
November 1	7:00 pm	at Clarkson*		Cheel Arena • Potsdam, New York	ESPN+	Applebee	W 6–2	2,848	3–4–1
November 7	8:07 pm	at Bemidji State		Sanford Center • Bemidji, Minnesota	Midco Sports+	Applebee	L 1–4	2,137	3–5–1 (0–3–0)
November 8	7:07 pm	at Bemidji State		Sanford Center • Bemidji, Minnesota	Midco Sports+	Applebee	L 2–3 ^{OT}	2,263	3–6–1 (0–4–0)
November 14	7:07 pm	#16 Minnesota State		Taffy Abel Arena • Sault Ste. Marie, Michigan	Midco Sports+	Applebee	L 1–2 ^{OT}	—	3–7–1 (0–5–0)
November 15	6:07 pm	#16 Minnesota State		Taffy Abel Arena • Sault Ste. Marie, Michigan	Midco Sports+	Oke	L 2–4	—	3–8–1 (0–6–0)
November 21	7:07 pm	at Ferris State		Ewigleben Arena • Big Rapids, Michigan	Midco Sports+	Applebee	W 2–1	1,738	4–8–1 (1–6–0)
November 22	6:07 pm	at Ferris State		Ewigleben Arena • Big Rapids, Michigan	Midco Sports+	Applebee	L 3–4	1,830	4–9–1 (1–7–0)
November 28	7:07 pm	Augustana		Taffy Abel Arena • Sault Ste. Marie, Michigan	Midco Sports+	Applebee	W 2–1	—	5–9–1 (2–7–0)
November 29	6:07 pm	Augustana		Taffy Abel Arena • Sault Ste. Marie, Michigan	Midco Sports+	Applebee	L 1–2	—	5–10–1 (2–8–0)
December 5	8:07 pm	at St. Thomas		Lee & Penny Anderson Arena • Saint Paul, Minnesota	Midco Sports+	Applebee	W 5–3	2,169	6–10–1 (3–8–0)
December 6	7:07 pm	at St. Thomas		Lee & Penny Anderson Arena • Saint Paul, Minnesota	Midco Sports+	Applebee	L 1–4	2,012	6–11–1 (3–9–0)
Holiday Face–Off
December 28	8:30 pm	vs. #2 Wisconsin*		Fiserv Forum • Milwaukee, Wisconsin (Holiday Face–Off Semifinal)	B1G+	Applebee	L 2–3	8,277	6–12–1
December 29	5:00 pm	vs. #13 Boston College*		Fiserv Forum • Milwaukee, Wisconsin (Holiday Face–Off Consolation Game)	B1G+	Applebee	L 3–4	7,002	6–13–1
Regular Season
January 3	6:07 pm	Northern Michigan		Taffy Abel Arena • Sault Ste. Marie, Michigan	Midco Sports+	Applebee	W 2–1 ^{OT}	—	7–13–1 (4–9–0)
January 4	4:07 pm	Northern Michigan		Taffy Abel Arena • Sault Ste. Marie, Michigan	Midco Sports+	Applebee	W 2–1	—	8–13–1 (5–9–0)
January 16	7:07 pm	at Bowling Green		Slater Family Ice Arena • Bowling Green, Ohio	Midco Sports+	Applebee	L 1–3	3,303	8–14–1 (5–10–0)
January 17	6:07 pm	at Bowling Green		Slater Family Ice Arena • Bowling Green, Ohio	Midco Sports+	Applebee	W 1–0	3,367	9–14–1 (6–10–0)
January 23	7:07 pm	#16 St. Thomas		Taffy Abel Arena • Sault Ste. Marie, Michigan	Midco Sports+	Applebee	L 4–7	1,825	9–15–1 (6–11–0)
January 24	6:07 pm	#16 St. Thomas		Taffy Abel Arena • Sault Ste. Marie, Michigan	Midco Sports+	Oke	L 0–5	1,676	9–16–1 (6–12–0)
January 30	8:07 pm	at #16 Augustana		Midco Arena • Sioux Falls, South Dakota	Midco Sports+	Applebee	L 1–6	2,970	9–17–1 (6–13–0)
January 31	7:07 pm	at #16 Augustana		Midco Arena • Sioux Falls, South Dakota	Midco Sports+	Applebee	L 1–4	2,880	9–18–1 (6–14–0)
February 13	7:07 pm	#17 Michigan Tech		Taffy Abel Arena • Sault Ste. Marie, Michigan	Midco Sports+	Applebee	T 2–2 ^{SOW}	1,501	9–18–2 (6–14–1)
February 14	6:07 pm	#17 Michigan Tech		Taffy Abel Arena • Sault Ste. Marie, Michigan	Midco Sports+	Applebee	L 4–5 ^{OT}	989	9–19–2 (6–15–1)
February 20	7:07 pm	at Northern Michigan		Berry Events Center • Marquette, Michigan	Midco Sports+	Applebee	W 7–5	2,544	10–19–2 (7–15–1)
February 21	6:07 pm	at Northern Michigan		Berry Events Center • Marquette, Michigan	Midco Sports+	Applebee	W 5–2	2,520	11–19–2 (8–15–1)
February 26	7:07 pm	Ferris State		Taffy Abel Arena • Sault Ste. Marie, Michigan	Midco Sports+	Applebee	L 2–5	611	11–20–2 (8–16–1)
February 27	6:07 pm	Ferris State		Taffy Abel Arena • Sault Ste. Marie, Michigan	Midco Sports+	Oke	T 2–2 ^{SOW}	1,601	11–20–3 (8–16–2)
CCHA Tournament
March 6	8:07 pm	at #19 St. Thomas*		Lee & Penny Anderson Arena • Saint Paul, Minnesota (CCHA Quarterfinal Game 1)	Midco Sports+	Applebee	L 3–4 ^{OT}	1,217	11–21–3
March 7	8:07 pm	at #19 St. Thomas*		Lee & Penny Anderson Arena • Saint Paul, Minnesota (CCHA Quarterfinal Game 2)	Midco Sports+	Applebee	L 2–5	1,286	11–22–3
*Non-conference game. ^{#}Rankings from USCHO.com Poll. All times are in Eastern Time. Source:

== Scoring statistics ==
Name	Position	Games	Goals	Assists	Points	PIM
William Ahlrik	C	36	11	16	27	24
Calem Mangone	RW	34	12	13	25	32
Ryan Beck	C	33	7	13	20	41
Connor Millburn	F	34	6	13	19	18
Adam Barone	D	36	4	15	19	24
Branden Piku	F	34	8	9	17	22
Hunter Ramos	F	35	7	9	16	24
Carter Batchelder	C	34	5	10	15	8
John Herrington	C	36	5	8	13	8
Sasha Teleguine	F	36	5	8	13	23
Evan Bushy	D	36	3	10	13	6
John Druskinis	D	34	3	8	11	36
Wilson Dahlheimer	F	33	5	2	7	18
Bryan Huggins	D	29	1	6	7	8
Luke Levandowski	F	27	2	4	6	2
Tyson Galloway	D	25	1	5	6	4
Samuel Bélanger	D	32	2	3	5	18
Mike Brown	D	33	1	4	5	42
Reagan Milburn	F	22	2	2	4	6
Hadley Hudak	F	18	2	0	2	33
Matheson Mason	C	4	0	2	2	2
Pierson Sobush	LW	3	0	1	1	10
Luke Antonacci	D	24	0	1	1	0
Jack Blanchett	D	4	0	0	0	0
Everett Pietila	F	4	0	0	0	0
Max Ranström	D	5	0	0	0	0
Blake Humphrey	C	6	0	0	0	2
Andrew Oke	G	8	0	0	0	0
Rorke Applebee	G	31	0	0	0	2
Total			92	162	254	419

== Goaltending statistics ==
Name	Games	Minutes	Wins	Losses	Ties	Goals Against	Saves	Shut Outs	SV %	GAA
Rorke Applebee	32	1785:41	10	18	1	87	920	1	.914	2.92
Andrew Oke	8	379:46	1	4	2	25	181	0	.879	3.95
Empty Net	-	27:32	-	-	-	9	-	-	-	-
Total	36	2192:59	11	22	3	121	1101	1	.901	3.31

== Rankings ==
Poll	Week																											
Poll	Pre	1	2	3	4	5	6	7	8	9	10	11	12	13	14	15	16	17	18	19	20	21	22	23	24	25	26	27 (Final)
USCHO.com	NR	NR	NR	NR	NR	NR	NR	NR	NR	NR	NR	NR	–	NR	NR	NR	NR	NR	NR	NR	NR	NR	NR	NR	NR	NR	NR	NR
USA Hockey	NR	NR	NR	NR	NR	NR	NR	NR	NR	NR	NR	NR	–	NR	NR	NR	NR	NR	NR	NR	NR	NR	NR	NR	NR	NR	NR	NR
