= Furuberget =

- Founded: 2013
- Founder: André Lersveen, Ole Torstein Hovig
- Genre: Alternative rock; pop; indie pop; synthpop; indie rock; rock; electropop
- Country of origin: Norway
- Location: Oslo, Norway
- Official website: http://www.furuberget.no

Furuberget is an independent record label founded in 2013 and based in Oslo, Norway. The label was created by musicians André Lersveen and Ole Torstein Hovig. The company name (literally 'the pine mountain') comes from the name of the forest in Hedmark where Lersveen grew up, Furuberget Nature Reserve. In addition to their digital releases, Furuberget operates an online store through bandcamp for its vinyl releases. Furuberget has signed many artists including The Hallway and previously Ludvig Moon with Spellemannprisen winners as members. Vidar Norheim, former member of Liverpool band Wave Machines, is also signed to Furuberget with his solo EP. Uno Møller, formerly of pop band Team Me, released Lizards under Furuberget in February and his album will come under the label later in the month.

== Current roster ==
- ALMOSTHAPPY
- Erick Ellectrick & His Fantasy Gang
- Killer Kid Mozart
- Magic Mirror
- Mt. Mélodie
- Posterboys
- Sad Chloë
- Spielbergs
- Spring Breakers
- Uno Møller
- Vidar Norheim
- Wild Fauna
- Yobrepus

== Discography ==
Furuberget uses bandcamp as well as iTunes and Spotify to distribute its digital releases and Tiger Record Shop in Oslo to distribute physical content worldwide.

Year	Artist	Release	Release Type
2013	Ludvig Moon	Summer Glow-fi	EP
2013	Hi Ho Mustachio	Mt. Pleasure, You're Blocking My View	Single
2014	Unnveig Aas	How Long Must A Woman Mourn	Single
2015	Hi Ho Mustachio	Treehouse EP	EP
2015	Unnveig Aas	Love EP	EP
2016	Erick Ellectrick & His Fantasy Gang	Space Debris / When Your Chances Are Gone	Single
2016	ALMOSTHAPPY	Holding On	Single
2016	Killer Kid Mozart	Crash Report	Single
2016	The Hallway	Air/Closer	Single
2016	Erick Ellectrick & His Fantasy Gang	Whatever Happens Please Don't Forget Me	Single
2016	The Hallway	Vestad	EP
2016	Killer Kid Mozart	Closure	Single
2016	Sad Chloë	Scared of Other Worlds	Album
2016	Erick Ellectrick & His Fantasy Gang	Epilogue	Single
2016	Wild Fauna	Crooked Smile	Single
2016	Spielbergs	Daisy! It's the New Me	Single
2016	Vidar Norheim	Blind Carbon Copy	EP
2016	Mt. Mélodie	The Sea of Trees	Single
2016	Spielbergs	Ghost Boy	Single
2017	Spielbergs	We Are All Going to Die/Daniil	Single
2017	Uno Møller	Lizards	Single
2017	Posterboys	Best Friends	Single
2017	Yobrepus	Get on Board	Single
2017	Magic Mirror	Look Into My Eyes	Single
2017	Uno Møller	Jubilee	Single
2017	Mt. Mélodie	Burn Down This City	Single
2017	Uno Møller	Frog Box	Album
2017	Yobrepus	Blakc Mould	Album
2017	Wild Fauna	Ghost Boy	Single
2017	Spring Breakers	Shaking Hands	Single

== Former Artists ==
Artists that were formerly part of Furuberget.

- The Hallway
- Hi Ho Mustachio
- Ludvig Moon
- Unnveig Aas
