= Team Me =

Norwegian pop music band

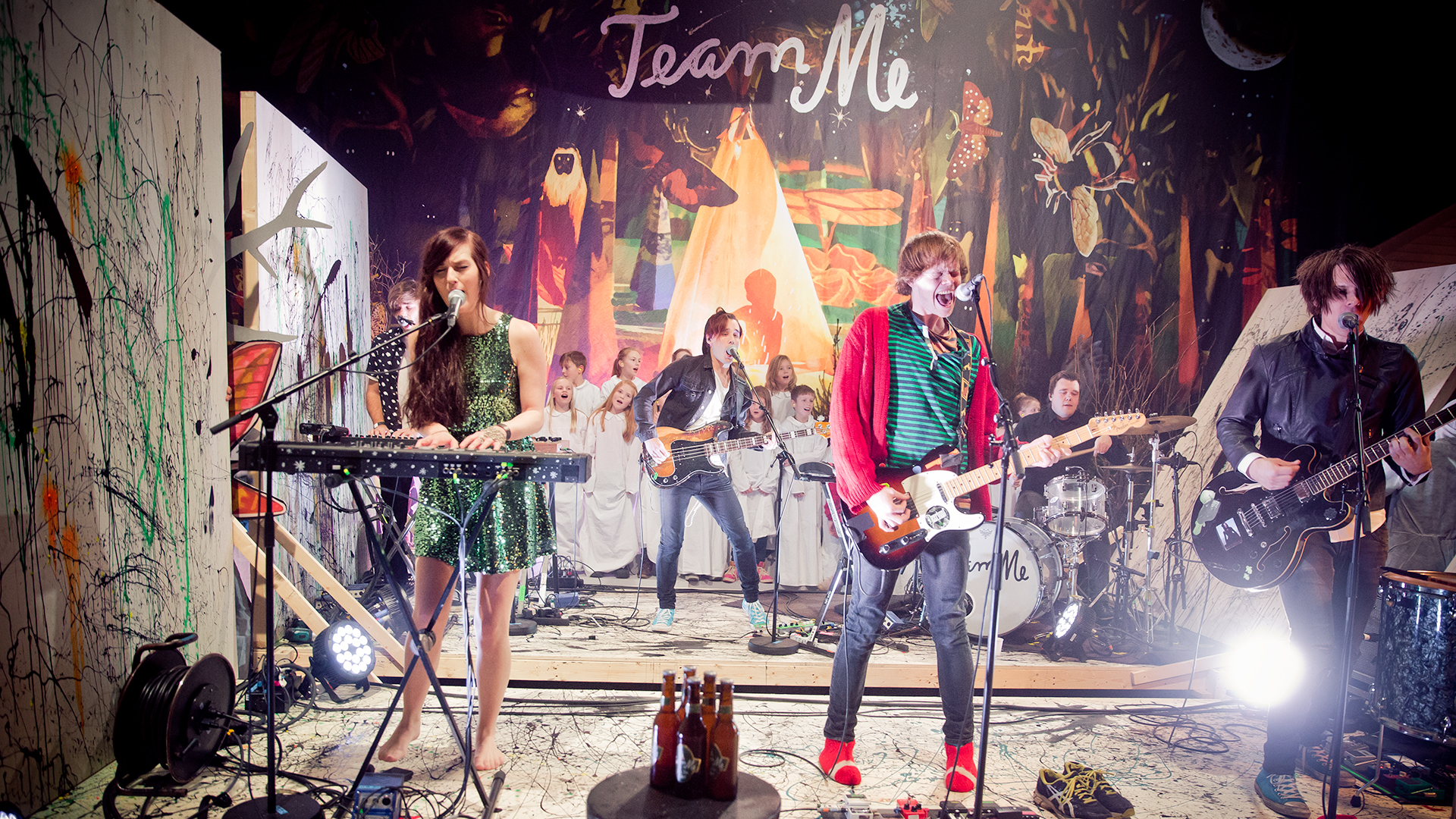
- Team Me on P3 Gull, 2014

Background information
- Origin: Elverum, Norway
- Genres: Pop, rock, indie pop
- Years active: 2010–2015, 2019–present
- Labels: Propeller Recordings; Universal Music
- Members: Marius Drogsås Hagen; Elida Inman Tjørve; Simen Schikulski; Bjarne Alexander Ryen Berg; Simen Sandbæk Skari; Uno Møller Christiansen; Julie Ofelia Østrem Ossum; Andreas Reiten Westhagen
- Past members: Anders Magnor Killerud (2010-2011); Synne Øverland Knudsen (2010-2012); Thomas Meidell (2010-2011); Christian Løvhaug (2010)
- Website: www.teammeband.com

Team Me is an indie pop band from Norway. Their 2011 debut studio album To the Treetops! won the 2011 Norwegian Grammy Awards (Spellemannprisen) in the category Best Pop Group of the Year. Their second studio album Blind as Night was released in early 2015. They disbanded in late 2015 to work on other projects, but Hagen has continued working as Team Me until it was announced in February 2019 that the band had reformed, with two additional members.

== History ==
=== Formation and early work (2010–2011) ===
Team Me made their concert debut in Trondheim on 22 January 2010 after they found themselves picked to play at Urørtfinalen, an annual Norwegian competition for up-and-coming bands held by NRK Urørt, which is a part of the Norwegian Broadcasting channel P3. Team Me was not an existing band at this stage, but the band's founder and songwriter Marius Drogsås Hagen gathered some friends in short time, and attended the finals to play a 30-minute set among bands like Kvelertak, Blood Command and The Pink Robots. The Pink Robots won and Kvelertak came in second, however Team Me gained attention for their finalist song "Fool", which was playlisted on Norwegian radio stations.

In the following months, the band's songs "Fool" and "Weathervanes and Chemicals" were spread around on blogs across the world, and the band kept playing shows in Norway, including summer festivals such as Øyafestivalen, Pstereo and Volumfestivalen in the summer of 2010. In an article on the UK website Drowned in Sound, Team Me was called one of the most interesting new bands, and the band was one of the first to be announced to play at both By:larm 2011 and The Great Escape 2011. During 2011 "Me and the Mountain" was featured in the trailer of Liberal Arts, an American comedy-drama film directed by Josh Radnor.

In the winter of 2011 Team Me announced that they had signed with Norwegian label Propeller Recordings, and an EP was released soon after. The song "Dear Sister" from the EP received airplay in Norway, Europe, the UK and the US.

Throughout 2011, Team Me played festivals across Europe, including The Great Escape in Brighton, Club NME in London, Reeperbahn festival in Hamburg, Øyafestivalen in Oslo, Iceland Airwaves, and Berlin Independent Nights. They also embarked on several tours in the UK, Europe and Norway with The Wombats.

=== To the Treetops! and Blind as Night (2011–2015) ===
In October 2011 Team Me released their debut studio album 'To the Treetops!' in Norway. The album was acclaimed by Norwegian media, with many claiming it to be one of the best debut albums ever made by a Norwegian pop band. The band sold out 5 of 10 shows at their release tour in Norway, followed up by another tour the winter of 2012, including a sold out-show at Rockefeller in Oslo, selling 1,300 tickets. In March 2012 To the Treetops! was released worldwide to similarly positive reviews. After their performances at 2012 SXSW Festival, British music magazine NME chose Team Me as "one of their 10 new favorite bands" from the festival's massive lineup with a big feature in the magazine.

Team Me toured extensively in the time after the release of their album, with several tours in Europe and Norway, plus shows in New York, Los Angeles and Austin in the US. The band also did a sold out show at Liquid Room, a 900 capacity venue in Tokyo in May 2012.

In the summer of 2012 Team Me played summer festivals such as Roskilde Festival in Denmark, Latitude in the UK, Dour Festival in Belgium, Paredes de Coura Festival in Portugal, and Haldern Pop Festival in Germany.

In 2013, the documentary “Sayonara, Elverum” by director Sven Arild Storberget was screened at the Poolinale in Vienna, Austria; it follows the band on their first trip to Japan in May 2012 to play in Tokyo and their encounters with Japanese fans. The 35-minute-long documentary film was produced by Kristoffer Kumar and can be streamed in full on Kumar’s Vimeo page.

In late 2014, Team Me released their second studio album Blind as Night in Norway. In January 2015 Blind as Night was released in the rest of the world on CD and MP3.

In November 2015, the band announced that they were ending Team Me and each member would be going to make music "in their own directions".

=== Reunion and Something in the Making (2019-present) ===
On 21 February 2019, the band updated their Facebook and Instagram profiles with teasers to what could be coming next. This then led to the official announcement of the band reforming the next day. Along with their reunion they released a single called "Blurry Precise" and revealed that they would be performing at festivals in the summer including Traena Music Festival, Trollrock, Fres Festival and Pstereo. On 5 April they released a follow-up single "The Future in Your Eyes" and on 14 June their third single of 2019 "Does Anyone Know How To Get To The Heart Of This" was released. On 10 January 2020, the band released a fourth single "Into the Wild".

On October 29, 2021, the band released "Song for a Drummer", announcing it as the first single for their upcoming album. On December 10, it was followed up by a second single, "Just Another Sleepless Night in the Dark", alongside an announcement that their third album will be titled Something in the Making, and be released on March 11, 2022.

== Discography ==
=== Albums ===
- To the Treetops! (2011)
- Blind as Night (2014)
- Something in the Making (2022)
- Return to the Riverside (2023)

=== EPs ===
- Team Me EP (2011)
- Female Lead (2012)

== Awards ==
- 2011
  - Spellemannprisen - Best Pop Group of the Year
- 2012
  - Independent Music Awards - Best EP (Team Me EP)
- 2013
  - Independent Music Awards - Best Indie/Alt (To the Treetops!)
