= 2026–27 Michigan State Spartans men's ice hockey season =

- Conference: Big Ten
- Home ice: Munn Ice Arena

Rankings
- USCHO: #9
- USA Hockey: #8

Record
- Overall: 7–4–1
- Conference: 1–2–1
- Home: 4–1–0
- Road: 2–3–1
- Neutral: 1–0–0

Coaches and captains
- Head coach: Adam Nightingale
- Assistant coaches: Jared DeMichiel; Mike Towns; Andy Contois
- Captain: Patrick Geary
- Alternate captain(s): Tommi Männistö; Shane Vansaghi

The 2026–27 Michigan State Spartans men's ice hockey season is the 85th season of play for the program and 36th in the Big Ten. The Spartans represent Michigan State University in the 2026–27 NCAA Division I men's ice hockey season, play their home games at the Munn Ice Arena and are coached by Adam Nightingale in his fifth season.

== Previous season ==
The Spartans finished the 2025–26 season 26–9–2, 16–6–2 in Big Ten play to win their third conference regular season championship. They lost to Ohio State in the semifinals of the Big Ten tournament. For the second straight season, the Spartans received a No. 1 seed in the NCAA tournament, No. 3 overall. They defeated UConn in the first round before they were eliminated in the regional final by Wisconsin in overtime.

== Departures ==
Player	Position	Nationality	Cause
Trey Augustine	Goaltender	United States	Signed professional contract (Detroit Red Wings)
Austin Baker	Forward	United States	Transferred to Miami
Matt Basgall	Forward	United States	Signed professional contract (San Diego Gulls)
Nathan Mackie	Forward	Canada	Transferred to Ferris State
Porter Martone	Forward	Canada	Signed professional contract (Philadelphia Flyers)
Colin Ralph	Defenseman	United States	Signed professional contract (Springfield Thunderbirds)
Daniel Russell	Forward	United States	Signed professional contract (Wilkes-Barre/Scranton Penguins)
Travis Shoudy	Defenseman	United States	Graduation (signed professional contract Kalamazoo Wings)
Tiernan Shoudy	Forward	United States	Signed professional contract Wilkes-Barre/Scranton Penguins
Melvin Strahl	Goaltender	Sweden	Transferred to Minnesota
Charlie Stramel	Forward	United States	Signed professional contract (Minnesota Wild)
Maxim Strbak	Defenseman	Slovakia	Signed professional contract (Buffalo Sabres)

== Recruiting and incoming transfers ==
Player	Position	Nationality	Age	Notes
Ethan Belchetz	Forward	Canada	18	Oakville, ON; selected 17th overall in 2026
Tommy Bleyl	Defenseman	United States	18	Schenectady, NY; selected 31st overall in 2026
Jimmy Clark	Forward	United States	21	Edina, MN; transfer from Minnesota; selected 213th overall in 2023
Jack Hextall	Forward	United States	18	Rolling Meadows, IL; selected 30th overall in 2026
Diego Johnson	Forward	Canada	20	Fort St. James, BC
Brady Peddle	Defenseman	Canada	19	Antigonish, NS; selected 91st overall in 2025
Cullen Potter	Forward	United States	19	Minneapolis, MN; transfer from Arizona State; selected 32nd overall in 2025
Joshua Ravensbergen	Goaltender	Canada	19	North Vancouver, BC; selected 30th overall in 2025
Chase Reid	Forward	United States	18	Chesterfield, MI; selected 7th overall in 2026
JJ Salajko	Goaltender	United States	20	Columbus, OH
Quentin Sigurdson	Goaltender	United States	23	Sartell, MN; transfer from Northeastern
Mason West	Forward	United States	19	Edina, MN; selected 29th overall in 2025

== Season summary ==
=== Exhibition ===
For the second consecutive year, the Spartans were ranked No. 3 in the preseason polls. On October 2, 2026, the Spartans faced Boston College in an exhibition game at Munn. The Spartans scored the first two goals of the game before the Eagles drew within one midway through the second. Anthony Romani scored his second goal of the game in the third and Eric Nilson pushed the lead to 4–1 less than three minutes into the third. BC narrowed the lead to two four minutes later and the Spartans added an empty-netter to win 5–2. Quentin Sigurdson got the start in goal for the Spartans while Joshua Ravensbergen played a little less than half the game as well. Both goalies allowed a goal in their time on the ice.

=== Regular season ===
==== Northern Michigan ====
The Spartans began their regular season with two home games against Northern Michigan on October 9 and 11. In game one, the Spartans scored less than two minutes into the game and took a 3–0 lead halfway through the first period. NMU drew within two with seven minutes left in the first. The Wildcats narrowed the lead to one 40 seconds in to the third period. However, Gavin O'Connell scored 54 seconds later on a power play to push the lead back to two. Anthony Romani scored his second of the game halfway through the third before Jack Hextall put the game away with less than five minutes remaining as MSU won 6–2. Joshua Ravensbergen got the start in goal, stopping 14 of the 16 shots he faced. Two days later, Jimmy Clark gave MSU a 1–0 lead halfway through the first. Early in the second, the Wildcats tied the game at one. From there, the Spartans dominated, scoring four unanswered goals for an easy 5–1 win. Anthony Romani scored his third goal of the season in the game while Jack Hextall scored his second on the season to give MSU the weekend sweep. Quentin Sigurdson manned the net for the Spartans, stopping 28 of 29 shots.

==== RIT ====
The Spartans, after retaining their No. 3 ranks in both polls, faced the Rochester Institute of Technology in New York on October 17. The Spartans took an early lead on Ryker Lee goal and extended the lead to two in the second as Chase Reid notched his first goal of the season. Three minutes later, RIT narrowed the lead to one again before the Spartans scored two more times in the first 10 minutes of the third. With a 4–1 lead, Joshua Ravensbergen stopped 15 shots in the third before MSU added and empty net goal to earn the 5–1 win. Five different Spartans scored as they moved their record to 3–0–0. With 0:25 left before game end, a large conflict left both MSU and RIT with 5 roughing and 5 misconduct penalties each. Penalty minutes totaled 72 MSU and 79 RIT.

==== New Hampshire ====
The Spartans, having moved to No. 2 in both polls will take to the road again to face New Hampshire on October 23 and 24. In game one, MSU managed only 14 shots and failed to score. Joshua Ravensbergen made 32 saves, but the Wildcats notched the game winner nine minutes into the third period. The 1–0 loss marked the first loss of the season for the Spartans. In game two, Mason West scored the first Spartan goal of the series with less than three minutes remaining in the second. Anthony Romani pushed the lead to 2–0 five minutes into the third. UNH narrowed the lead to won half way through the third, but the Spartans held on for the 2–1 win.

==== North Dakota ====
The Spartans, having fallen to No. 4 in the polls, traveled to Texas to play in the US Hockey Hall of Fame Game against No. 8-ranked North Dakota on Halloween night. Neither team scored in the first before the Spartans lit the lamp 54 seconds into the second on a power play goal by Anthony Romani. Eric Nilson pushed the lead to 2–0 three minutes later. However, the Hawks scored shortly thereafter and tied the game less than two minutes in to the third period. Romani gave the Spartans the lead again 7:41 into the third, scoring his second of the game and seventh for the season. The lead lasted nine minutes before the Hawks scored on a power play goal tie the game at three. However, Cayden Lindstrom notched his second goal of the season at 16:27 and Tommi Männistö scored an empty-netter to give MSU the 5–3 win.

== Roster ==
As of October 11, 2026.

No.	Nat.	Player	Class	Pos	Height	Weight	DoB	Hometown	Previous team	NHL rights
1	(United States)	Quentin Sigurdson	Junior	G	6' 2" (1.88 m)	180 lb (82 kg)	2003-07-12	Sartell, Minnesota	Northeastern (HEA)	—
2	(United States)	Patrick Geary (C)	Senior	D	6' 1" (1.85 m)	195 lb (88 kg)	2004-02-18	Hamburg, New York	Waterloo Black Hawks (USHL)	BUF, 172nd overall 2024
3	(United States)	Sean Barnhill	Sophomore	D	6' 6" (1.98 m)	215 lb (98 kg)	2007-01-08	Scottsdale, Arizona	Dubuque Fighting Saints (USHL)	NYR, 70th overall 2025
4	(Canada)	Brady Peddle	Freshman	D	6' 3" (1.91 m)	210 lb (95 kg)	2007-05-23	Antigonish, Nova Scotia	Charlottetown Islanders (QMJHL)	PIT, 91st overall 2025
6	(United States)	Cole Ward	Sophomore	D	6' 6" (1.98 m)	210 lb (95 kg)	2005-11-12	Rochester Hills, Michigan	Tri-City Storm (USHL)	—
7	(United States)	Jimmy Clark	Senior	F	6' 0" (1.83 m)	185 lb (84 kg)	2004-09-24	Edina, Minnesota	Minnesota (Big Ten)	MIN, 213th overall 2023
9	(United States)	Mason West	Freshman	F	6' 6" (1.98 m)	225 lb (102 kg)	2007-08-03	Edina, Minnesota	Fargo Force (USHL)	CHI, 29th overall 2025
10	(Finland)	Tommi Männistö (A)	Senior	F	6' 0" (1.83 m)	200 lb (91 kg)	2004-02-07	Riihimäki, Finland	Tappara U20 (U20 SM-sarja)	—
11	(United States)	Owen West	Junior	D	5' 11" (1.8 m)	190 lb (86 kg)	2004-06-01	Pittsboro, Indiana	Des Moines Buccaneers (USHL)	—
12	(United States)	Griffin Jurecki	Senior	F	5' 10" (1.78 m)	180 lb (82 kg)	2003-05-03	Grosse Ile, Michigan	Omaha Lancers (USHL)	—
14	(Canada)	Matt Lahey	Sophomore	D	6' 6" (1.98 m)	210 lb (95 kg)	2006-07-17	Victoria, British Columbia	Fargo Force (USHL)	—
15	(Canada)	Anthony Romani	Sophomore	F	6' 1" (1.85 m)	194 lb (88 kg)	2005-07-12	Pickering, Ontario	Barrie Colts (OHL)	VAN, 162nd overall 2024
16	(Canada)	Ethan Belchetz	Freshman	F	6' 5" (1.96 m)	225 lb (102 kg)	2008-03-30	Oakville, Ontario	Windsor Spitfires (OHL)	UTA, 17th overall 2026
17	(United States)	Jack Hextall	Freshman	F	6' 1" (1.85 m)	195 lb (88 kg)	2008-03-23	Rolling Meadows, Illinois	Youngstown Phantoms (USHL)	CGY, 30th overall 2026
18	(United States)	Ryker Lee	Sophomore	F	6' 1" (1.85 m)	190 lb (86 kg)	2006-11-08	Wilmette, Illinois	Madison Capitols (USHL)	NSH, 26th overall 2025
19	(Canada)	Diego Johnson	Freshman	F	6' 0" (1.83 m)	190 lb (86 kg)	2006-09-07	Fort St. James, British Columbia	Penticton Vees (WHL)	—
21	(United States)	Cullen Potter	Junior	F	5' 10" (1.78 m)	180 lb (82 kg)	2007-01-10	Minneapolis, Minnesota	Arizona State (NCHC)	CGY, 32nd overall 2025
22	(United States)	Tommy Bleyl	Freshman	D	6' 0" (1.83 m)	170 lb (77 kg)	2007-12-01	Schenectady, New York	Moncton Wildcats (QMJHL)	NSH, 31st overall 2026
23	(United States)	Shane Vansaghi (A)	Junior	F	6' 2" (1.88 m)	215 lb (98 kg)	2006-10-11	St. Louis, Missouri	USNTDP (USHL)	PHI, 48th overall 2025
25	(United States)	Cole Burke	Sophomore	F	6' 2" (1.88 m)	180 lb (82 kg)	2004-02-18	Trenton, Michigan	Fairbanks Ice Dogs (NAHL)	—
26	(Sweden)	Eric Nilson	Sophomore	F	6' 0" (1.83 m)	170 lb (77 kg)	2007-05-11	Calgary, Alberta	Djurgårdens IF U20 (J20 Nationell)	ANA, 45th overall 2025
27	(United States)	Chase Reid	Freshman	D	6' 2" (1.88 m)	190 lb (86 kg)	2007-12-30	Chesterfield, Michigan	Soo Greyhounds (OHL)	SEA, 7th overall 2026
28	(Canada)	Cayden Lindstrom	Sophomore	F	6' 3" (1.91 m)	220 lb (100 kg)	2006-02-03	Chetwynd, British Columbia	Medicine Hat Tigers (WHL)	CBJ, 4th overall 2024
31	(Canada)	Joshua Ravensbergen	Freshman	G	6' 5" (1.96 m)	200 lb (91 kg)	2006-11-27	North Vancouver, British Columbia	Prince George Cougars (WHL)	SJS, 30th overall 2025
32	(United States)	JJ Salajko	Freshman	G	6' 2" (1.88 m)	195 lb (88 kg)	2006-07-28	Columbus, Ohio	Watertown Shamrocks (NAHL)	—

== Standings ==
2026–27 Big Ten ice hockey Standings
	Conference record										Overall record					
	GP	W	L	T	OTW	OTL	3/SW	PTS	GF	GA	GP	W	L	T	GF	GA
#2 Wisconsin	6	4	1	1	0	0	1	14	29	7	10	8	1	1	42	10
Notre Dame	7	4	2	1	2	0	1	12	22	28	13	6	6	1	34	47
#1 Michigan	5	4	1	0	1	0	0	11	26	16	12	11	1	0	65	30
Ohio State	5	2	3	0	0	1	0	7	16	20	11	4	7	0	32	38
#19 Minnesota	4	1	1	2	1	0	0	4	6	11	12	5	4	3	33	38
Penn State	6	0	5	1	0	2	1	4	16	28	12	2	9	1	33	51
#9 Michigan State	3	0	2	1	0	1	0	2	4	9	11	6	4	1	34	24
Championship: March 19, 2027 † indicates conference regular season champion * indicates conference tournament champion Rankings: USCHO.com Top 20 Poll; updated November 20, 2026

== Schedule and results ==
Date	Time	Opponent^{#}	Rank^{#}	Site	TV	Decision	Result	Attendance	Record
Exhibition
October 2	5:00 pm	Boston College*	#3	Munn Ice Arena • East Lansing, Michigan (Exhibition)		Sigurdson	W 5–2	6,555	–
Regular Season
October 9	7:30 pm	Northern Michigan*	#3	Munn Ice Arena • East Lansing, Michigan	B1G+	Ravensbergen	W 6–2	6,555	1–0–0
October 10	1:00 pm	Northern Michigan*	#3	Munn Ice Arena • East Lansing, Michigan	B1G+	Sigurdson	W 5–1	6,555	2–0–0
October 17	7:05 pm	at RIT*	#3	Gene Polisseni Center • Henrietta, New York	FloSports	Ravensbergen	W 5–1	10,556	3–0–0
October 23	7:00 pm	at New Hampshire*	#2	Whittemore Center • Durham, New Hampshire	ESPN+	Ravensburgen	L 0–1	5,784	3–1–0
October 24	7:00 pm	at New Hampshire*	#2	Whittemore Center • Durham, New Hampshire	ESPN+	Ravensburgen	W 2–1	6,002	4–1–0
October 31	8:07 pm	vs. #8 North Dakota*	#4	H-E-B Center • Cedar Park, Texas (US Hockey Hall of Fame Game)	Midco Sports Network	Ravensburgen	W 5–3	6,483	5–1–0
November 6	7:00 pm	#13 Boston University*	#3	Munn Ice Arena • East Lansing, Michigan	B1G+	Ravensburgen	L 2–6	6,555	5–2–0
November 7	4:30 pm	#13 Boston University*	#3	Munn Ice Arena • East Lansing, Michigan	B1G+	Ravensburgen	W 5–0	6,555	6–2–0
November 12	7:00 pm	at Notre Dame	#4	Compton Family Ice Arena • Notre Dame, Indiana	Peacock	Ravensburgen	L 2–3 ^{OT}	4,415	6–3–0 (0–1–0)
November 13	7:00 pm	at Notre Dame	#4	Compton Family Ice Arena • Notre Dame, Indiana	Peacock	Ravensburgen	T 1–1 ^{SOL}	5,028	6–3–1 (0–1–1)
November 20	7:00 pm	at #1 Michigan	#9	Yost Ice Arena • Ann Arbor, Michigan (Rivalry)	B1G+	Ravensburgen	L 1–5	5,800	6–4–1 (0–2–1)
November 21	6:00 pm	#1 Michigan	#9	Munn Ice Arena • East Lansing, Michigan	B1G+	Ravensburgen	W 2–0	6,555	7–4–1 (1–2–1)
December 3	8:00 pm	at Ohio State		Value City Arena • Columbus, Ohio	BTN				
December 4	6:00 pm	at Ohio State		Value City Arena • Columbus, Ohio	BTN				
December 11	7:00 pm	Minnesota		Munn Ice Arena • Lansing, Michigan	BTN				
December 12	7:00 pm	Minnesota		Munn Ice Arena • Lansing, Michigan	BTN				
Great Lakes Invitational
December 29	7:00 pm	vs. Lindenwood*		Van Andel Arena • Grand Rapids, Michigan (Great Lakes Semifinal)					
December 30	3:30pm or 7:00 pm	vs. Michigan Tech / Western Michigan*		Van Andel Arena • Grand Rapids, Michigan (Great Lakes)					
Regular Season
January 3	4:00 pm	USNTDP*		Munn Ice Arena • East Lansing, Michigan (Exhibition)					
January 8	8:00 pm	at Wisconsin		Kohl Center • Madison, Wisconsin					
January 9	8:30 pm	at Wisconsin		Kohl Center • Madison, Wisconsin	BTN				
January 15	7:00 pm	Penn State		Munn Ice Arena • East Lansing, Michigan					
January 16	8:00 pm	Penn State		Munn Ice Arena • East Lansing, Michigan	BTN				
January 29	8:00 pm	at Minnesota		3M Arena at Mariucci • Minneapolis, Minnesota					
January 30	8:00 pm	at Minnesota		3M Arena at Mariucci • Minneapolis, Minnesota	BTN				
February 5	6:00 pm	Michigan		Munn Ice Arena • East Lansing, Michigan (Rivalry)	FS1				
February 6	6:00 pm	vs. Michigan		Little Caesars Arena • Detroit, Michigan (Duel in the D)	BTN				
February 12	7:00 pm	Wisconsin		Munn Ice Arena • East Lansing, Michigan					
February 13	6:00 pm	Wisconsin		Munn Ice Arena • East Lansing, Michigan					
February 19	6:00 pm	at Penn State		Pegula Ice Arena • University Park, Pennsylvania	BTN				
February 20	TBA	Penn State		Pegula Ice Arena • University Park, Pennsylvania					
February 25	6:00 pm	Notre Dame		Munn Ice Arena • East Lansing, Michigan	BTN				
February 27	6:00 pm	Notre Dame		Munn Ice Arena • East Lansing, Michigan	BTN				
March 4	7:00 pm	Ohio State		Munn Ice Arena • East Lansing, Michigan					
March 5	7:00 pm	Ohio State		Munn Ice Arena • East Lansing, Michigan					
*Non-conference game. ^{#}Rankings from USCHO.com Poll. All times are in Eastern Time. Source:

== Statistics ==
=== Scoring ===
(through November 5, 2026)

Name	Position	Games	Goals	Assists	Points	PIM
Sean Barnhill	D	6	0	1	1	16
Ethan Belchetz	F	6	1	1	2	0
Tommy Bleyl	D	6	0	3	3	4
Jimmy Clark	F	6	1	2	3	0
Patrick Geary	D	6	0	0	0	4
Jack Hextall	F	6	2	2	4	2
Matthew Lahey	D	6	0	0	0	12
Ryker Lee	F	6	2	5	7	0
Cayden Lindstrom	F	6	2	0	2	18
Tommi Männistö	F	6	2	1	3	2
Eric Nilson	F	6	2	4	6	2
Gavin O'Connell	F	6	1	3	4	8
Brady Peddle	D	6	0	2	2	4
Cullen Potter	F	6	1	2	3	4
Chase Reid	D	6	1	6	7	10
Anthony Romani	F	6	7	3	10	2
Shane Vansaghi	F	6	0	0	0	30
Mason West	F	6	1	0	1	16
Owen West	D	6	0	0	0	2
Total		6	23	36	59	138

=== Goaltending ===
(through November 5, 2026)

Name	Games	Minutes	Wins	Losses	Ties	Goals against	Saves	Shut outs	SV %	GAA
Joshua Ravensbergen	5	297:10	4	1	0	8	144	0	.947	1.62
Quentin Sigurdson	1	60:00	1	0	0	1	29	0	.967	1.00
Total	6	360:00	5	1	0	9	173	0	.951	1.50

== Rankings ==
Poll	Week																											
Poll	Pre	1	2	3	4	5	6	7	8	9	10	11	12	13	14	15	16	17	18	19	20	21	22	23	24	25	26	27 (Final)
USCHO.com	3 (7)	3 (5)	3 (3)	2 (2)	4	3 (3)	4	9																				
USA Hockey	3 (3)	3 (2)	3 (1)	2	4	3 (1)	4	8																				

== Players drafted into the NHL ==
Michigan State had four players drafted in the first round of the 2026 NHL entry draft.

Year	Round	Pick	Player	NHL team
2026	1	7	Chase Reid	Seattle Kraken
2026	1	17	Ethan Belchetz	Utah Mammoth
2026	1	30	Jack Hextall	Calgary Flames
2026	1	31	Tommy Bleyl	Nashville Predators
