= The Final Four =

Final Four or The Final Four can refer to:

== Sports ==
- Final four, a general sports term that refers to the last four teams in a playoff tournament
- Final Four, semifinals of the NCAA Division I men's basketball tournament
- Final Four, semifinals of the NCAA Division I women's basketball tournament
- Final Four College Basketball, a 1985 video game
- EuroLeague Final Four, a professional basketball competition in Europe

== Television ==
- The Final Four (TV series), a Greek reality television singing competition
- "The Final Four", an alternate name for "The Bracket", an episode of How I Met Your Mother
- In Your House 13: Final Four, a 1997 professional wrestling pay-per-view event

== See also ==
- Final Five (disambiguation)
- Frozen Four
