= 2026–27 Michigan Wolverines men's ice hockey season =

- Conference: Big Ten
- Home ice: Yost Ice Arena

Rankings
- USCHO: #1
- USA Today: #1

Record
- Overall: 11–2–0
- Conference: 4–2–0
- Home: 7–0–0
- Road: 4–2–0
- Neutral: 0–0–0

Coaches and captains
- Head coach: Brandon Naurato
- Assistant coaches: Chris Lazary; Mathew Deschamps; Kevin Reiter
- Captain: Garrett Schifsky
- Alternate captain(s): Asher Barnett; Michael Hage; Nick Moldenhauer; Ben Roberterson

The 2026–27 Michigan Wolverines men's hockey team is the Wolverines' 105th season of play. They represent the University of Michigan in the 2026–27 NCAA Division I men's ice hockey season. They are coached by Brandon Naurato, in his fifth year as head coach, and play their home games at Yost Ice Arena.

== Previous season ==
During the 2025–26 season, Michigan went 31–8–1, including 17–6–1 in Big Ten play. They won the 2026 Big Ten men's ice hockey tournament and earned an automatic bid to the 2026 NCAA tournament. During the NCAA tournament they advanced to the Frozen Four before being eliminated by eventual tournament champion Denver in double overtime.

== Departures ==
Player	Position	Nationality	Cause
Kienan Draper	Forward	United States	Graduation (signed with Grand Rapids Griffins)
Tyler Duke	Defenseman	United States	Graduation (signed with Wilkes-Barre/Scranton Penguins)
Josh Eernisse	Forward	United States	Graduation (signed with Columbus Blue Jackets)
Luca Fantilli	Defenseman	Canada	Graduation (signed with Charlotte Checkers)
Hunter Hady	Defenseman	United States	Transferred to Arizona State
T. J. Hughes	Forward	United States	Graduation (signed with Colorado Avalanche)
Matthew Mania	Defenseman	United States	Transferred to RIT
Teddy Spitznagel	Forward	United States	Transferred to Colorado College

== Recruiting ==
Player	Position	Nationality	Age	Notes
Kieren Dervin	Forward	Canada	19	Gloucester, ON
Landon DuPont	Defenseman	Canada	17	Calgary, AB
Brandt Harper	Defenseman	United States	20	Tampa, FL
JP Hurlbert	Forward	United States	18	Allen, TX
Jack Nesbitt	Forward	Canada	19	Sarnia, ON
Cameron Reid	Defenseman	Canada	19	Aylmer, ON
Nic Sima	Forward	Canada	21	Mississauga, ON

== Roster ==
As of September 24, 2026.

No.	Nat.	Player	Class	Pos	Height	Weight	DoB	Hometown	Previous team	NHL rights
2	(United States)	JP Hurlbert	Freshman	F	6' 0" (1.83 m)	191 lb (87 kg)	2008-04-11	Allen, Texas	Kamloops (WHL)	DET, 23 overall 2026
3	(United States)	Brandt Harper	Freshman	D	6' 1" (1.85 m)	196 lb (89 kg)	2006-07-20	Tampa, Florida	North Bay (OHL)	—
4	(United States)	Asher Barnett (A)	Sophomore	D	6' 1" (1.85 m)	198 lb (90 kg)	2007-05-16	Wilmette, Illinois	USNTDP (USHL)	EDM, 131 overall 2025
7	(United States)	Dakoda Rheaume-Mullen	Junior	D	6' 1" (1.85 m)	189 lb (86 kg)	2006-12-18	Northville, Michigan	USNTDP (USHL)	—
8	(Canada)	Landon DuPont	Freshman	D	6' 0" (1.83 m)	190 lb (86 kg)	2009-05-28	Calgary, Alberta	Everett (WHL)	—
9	(Canada)	Nick Moldenhauer (A)	Senior	F	5' 11" (1.8 m)	184 lb (83 kg)	2004-05-25	Mississauga, Ontario	Chicago (USHL)	TOR, 95th overall 2022
10	(United States)	Drew Schock	Sophomore	D	6' 0" (1.83 m)	180 lb (82 kg)	2007-02-07	Green Bay, Wisconsin	USNTDP (USHL)	ANA, 101 overall 2025
10	(United States)	Cole McKinney	Sophomore	F	6' 1" (1.85 m)	203 lb (92 kg)	2007-03-16	Lake Forest, Illinois	USNTDP (USHL)	SJS, 53 overall 2025
16	(United States)	Aidan Park	Sophomore	F	6' 1" (1.85 m)	188 lb (85 kg)	2006-01-06	Playa Vista, California	Green Bay (USHL)	EDM, 223 overall 2025
17	(United States)	Garrett Schifsky (C)	Senior	F	5' 9" (1.75 m)	186 lb (84 kg)	2003-04-08	Andover, Minnesota	Waterloo (USHL)	—
18	(Canada)	Jayden Perron	Senior	F	5' 9" (1.75 m)	178 lb (81 kg)	2005-01-11	Winnipeg, Manitoba	North Dakota (NCHC)	CAR, 94 overall 2023
19	(Canada)	Michael Hage (A)	Junior	F	6' 1" (1.85 m)	200 lb (91 kg)	2006-04-14	Oakville, Ontario	Chicago (USHL)	MTL, 21 overall 2024
21	(United States)	Ben Robertson (A)	Senior	F	6' 1" (1.85 m)	198 lb (90 kg)	2004-09-18	Potomac Falls, Virginia	Cornell (ECAC)	—
22	(United States)	Kason Muscutt	Sophomore	F	5' 11" (1.8 m)	176 lb (80 kg)	2005-02-03	Bossier City, Louisiana	Sioux City (USHL)	—
23	(United States)	Miles Gust	Junior	D	5' 9" (1.75 m)	183 lb (83 kg)	2004-03-17	Chicago, Illinois	Muskegon (USHL)	—
27	(Canada)	Malcolm Spence	Sophomore	F	6' 1" (1.85 m)	191 lb (87 kg)	2006-09-22	Mississauga, Ontario	Erie (OHL)	NYR, 43 overall 2025
31	(United States)	Stephen Peck	Sophomore	G	6' 2" (1.88 m)	177 lb (80 kg)	2005-01-18	New York, New York	Muskegon (USHL)	—
34	(Canada)	Julian Molinaro	Junior	G	5' 10" (1.78 m)	177 lb (80 kg)	2003-12-02	Mississauga, Ontario	Northern Michigan (CCHA)	—
44	(United States)	Will Horcoff	Junior	F	6' 5" (1.96 m)	204 lb (93 kg)	2007-01-23	Birmingham, Michigan	USNTDP (USHL)	PIT, 24 overall 2025
68	(Canada)	Josh Orrico	Senior	D	5' 9" (1.75 m)	172 lb (78 kg)	2003-06-15	Woodbridge, Ontario	Janesville (NAHL)	—
71	(Canada)	Jack Nesbitt	Freshman	F	6' 5" (1.96 m)	192 lb (87 kg)	2007-01-12	Sarnia, Ontario	Windsor (OHL)	—
72	(Canada)	Jack Ivankovic	Sophomore	G	6' 0" (1.83 m)	178 lb (81 kg)	2007-05-22	Mississauga, Ontario	Brampton (OHL)	NSH, 58 overall 2025
81	(Canada)	Cameron Reid	Freshman	D	6' 0" (1.83 m)	182 lb (83 kg)	2007-04-08	Aylmer, Ontario	Kitchener (OHL)	NSH, 21 overall 2025
88	(Canada)	Henry Mews	Sophomore	D	6' 1" (1.85 m)	190 lb (86 kg)	2006-03-09	Ottawa, Ontario	Sudbury (OHL)	—
92	(Canada)	Adam Valentini	Sophomore	F	5' 10" (1.78 m)	178 lb (81 kg)	2008-04-11	Toronto, Ontario	Chicago (USHL)	UTA, 96 overall 2026
95	(Canada)	Kieren Dervin	Freshman	F	6' 2" (1.88 m)	179 lb (81 kg)	2005-01-11	Gloucester, Ontario	Kingston (OHL)	—
96	(Canada)	Nic Sima	Freshman	F	6' 3" (1.91 m)	201 lb (91 kg)	2005-01-11	Mississauga, Ontario	Ottawa (OHL)	—

== Coaching staff ==
Name	Position coached	Seasons at Michigan
Brandon Naurato	Head coach	5th
Chris Lazary	Associate head coach	1st
Mathew Deschamps	Assistant coach	4th
Kevin Reiter	Assistant coach	4th
Evan Hall	Director of hockey operations	4th
Andrew Brewer	General manager and chief of staff	1st

== Standings ==
2026–27 Big Ten ice hockey Standings
	Conference record										Overall record					
	GP	W	L	T	OTW	OTL	3/SW	PTS	GF	GA	GP	W	L	T	GF	GA
#2 Wisconsin	6	4	1	1	0	0	1	14	29	7	10	8	1	1	42	10
Notre Dame	7	4	2	1	2	0	1	12	22	28	13	6	6	1	34	47
#1 Michigan	5	4	1	0	1	0	0	11	26	16	12	11	1	0	65	30
Ohio State	5	2	3	0	0	1	0	7	16	20	11	4	7	0	32	38
#19 Minnesota	4	1	1	2	1	0	0	4	6	11	12	5	4	3	33	38
Penn State	6	0	5	1	0	2	1	4	16	28	12	2	9	1	33	51
#9 Michigan State	3	0	2	1	0	1	0	2	4	9	11	6	4	1	34	24
Championship: March 19, 2027 † indicates conference regular season champion * indicates conference tournament champion Rankings: USCHO.com Top 20 Poll; updated November 20, 2026

== Schedule and results ==
Date	Time	Opponent^{#}	Rank^{#}	Site	TV	Decision	Result	Attendance	Record
Regular Season
October 2	7:00 PM	Bowling Green*	#2	Yost Ice Arena • Ann Arbor, MI	B1G+	Ivankovic	W 7–2	5,800	1–0–0
October 3	6:00 PM	at Bowling Green*	#2	Slater Family Ice Arena • Bowling Green, OH	Midco Sports Plus	Ivankovic	W 4–3	5,263	2–0–0
October 9	7:00 PM	Alaska Anchorage*	#2	Yost Ice Arena • Ann Arbor, MI	B1G+	Ivankovic	W 10–1	5,800	3–0–0
October 10	7:00 PM	Alaska Anchorage*	#2	Yost Ice Arena • Ann Arbor, MI	B1G+	Ivankovic	W 7–2	5,800	4–0–0
October 16	9:00 PM	at #1 Denver*	#2	Magness Arena • Denver, CO	NCHC.tv	Ivankovic	W 4–1	7,099	5–0–0
October 17	8:00 PM	at #1 Denver*	#2	Magness Arena • Denver, CO	NCHC.tv	Ivankovic	W 4–3	7,009	6–0–0
October 23	7:00 PM	#5 Western Michigan*	#1	Yost Ice Arena • Ann Arbor, MI	B1G+	Ivankovic	W 3–2	5,800	7–0–0
October 31	5:00 PM	at Ohio State	#1	Value City Arena • Columbus, OH (Rivalry)	B1G+	Ivankovic	L 2–5	3,774	7–1–0 (0–1–0)
November 1	7:30 PM	at Ohio State	#1	Value City Arena • Columbus, OH (Rivalry)	BTN	Ivankovic	W 5–4 ^{OT}	4,303	8–1–0 (1–1–0)
November 13	7:00 PM	Penn State	#2	Yost Ice Arena • Ann Arbor, MI	B1G+	Ivankovic	W 6–3	5,800	9–1–0 (2–1–0)
November 14	7:00 PM	Penn State	#2	Yost Ice Arena • Ann Arbor, MI	B1G+	Ivankovic	W 8–3	5,800	10–1–0 (3–1–0)
November 20	7:00 PM	#9 Michigan State	#1	Yost Ice Arena • Ann Arbor, MI (Rivalry)	B1G+	Ivankovic	W 5–1	5,800	11–1–0 (4–1–0)
November 21	6:00 PM	at #9 Michigan State	#1	Munn Ice Arena • East Lansing, MI (Rivalry)	B1G+	Ivankovic	L 0–2	6,555	11–2–0 (4–2–0)
November 27	7:00 PM	Ferris State*		Yost Ice Arena • Ann Arbor, MI	B1G+				
November 28	7:00 PM	Ferris State*		Yost Ice Arena • Ann Arbor, MI	B1G+				
December 4	8:30 PM	Wisconsin		Yost Ice Arena • Ann Arbor, MI	BTN				
December 5	7:00 PM	Wisconsin		Yost Ice Arena • Ann Arbor, MI	B1G+				
January 2	6:00 PM	at USNTDP*		USA Hockey Arena • Plymouth, MI (Exhibition)					
January 8	8:00 PM	at Minnesota		3M Arena at Mariucci • Minneapolis, MN (Rivalry)					
January 9	7:00 PM	at Minnesota		3M Arena at Mariucci • Minneapolis, MN (Rivalry)					
January 15	7:00 PM	at Notre Dame		Compton Family Ice Arena • Notre Dame, IN (Rivalry)					
January 16		at Notre Dame		Compton Family Ice Arena • Notre Dame, IN (Rivalry)					
January 22	7:00 PM	Ohio State		Yost Ice Arena • Ann Arbor, MI (Rivalry)					
January 23	8:00 PM	Ohio State		Yost Ice Arena • Ann Arbor, MI (Rivalry)	BTN				
January 30		vs. Western Michigan*		Waldo Stadium • Kalamazoo, MI					
February 5	6:00 PM	at Michigan State		Munn Ice Arena • East Lansing, MI (Rivalry)	FS1				
February 6		vs. Michigan State		Little Caesars Arena • Detroit, MI (Duel in the D)	BTN				
February 12	7:00 PM	Notre Dame		Yost Ice Arena • Ann Arbor, MI (Rivalry)					
February 13	6:30 PM	Notre Dame		Yost Ice Arena • Ann Arbor, MI (Rivalry)	BTN				
February 18	8:00 PM	at Wisconsin		Kohl Center • Madison, WI	BTN				
February 20	7:00 PM	vs. Wisconsin		Lambeau Field • Green Bay, WI	BTN				
February 26	8:00 PM	Minnesota		Yost Ice Arena • Ann Arbor, MI (Rivalry)	BTN				
February 27	6:00 PM	Minnesota		Yost Ice Arena • Ann Arbor, MI (Rivalry)	BTN				
March 4		at Penn State		Pegula Ice Arena • University Park, PA					
March 5		at Penn State		Pegula Ice Arena • University Park, PA					
*Non-conference game. ^{#}Rankings from USCHO.com Poll. All times are in Eastern Time. Source:

== Rankings ==
Ranking movements Legend: ██ Increase in ranking ██ Decrease in ranking ( ) = First-place votes
	Week																											
Poll	Pre	1	2	3	4	5	6	7	8	9	10	11	12	13	14	15	16	17	18	19	20	21	22	23	24	25	26	Final
USCHO.com	2 (6)	2 (6)	2 (14)	1 (47)	1 (49)	2 (9)	2 (6)	1 (39)																				
USA Hockey	2 (1)	2 (3)	2 (1)	1 (34)	1 (34)	2 (4)	2 (4)	1 (31)																				

== Awards and honors ==
Weekly Awards
Player	Award	Date Awarded	Ref.
Jayden Perron	Big Ten First Star of the Week	October 6, 2026	
Michael Hage	Big Ten Second Star of the Week	October 6, 2026	
Jayden Perron	Big Ten First Star of the Week	October 13, 2026	

== Players drafted into the NHL ==
Michigan had two players drafted in the 2026 NHL entry draft. JP Hurlbert was drafted 23rd overall by the Detroit Red Wings, while Adam Valentini was drafted 96th overall by the Utah Mammoth.

Year	Round	Pick	Player	NHL team
2026	1	23	JP Hurlbert	Detroit Red Wings
2026	3	96	Adam Valentini	Utah Mammoth
