= 2026–27 Big Ten Conference ice hockey season =

- Season: 2026–27
- Conference: Big Ten Conference
- Division: Division I
- Sport: ice hockey
- Duration: October 2, 2026– March 5, 2027
- Number of teams: 7

Regular Season

Big Ten Tournament

NCAA Tournament

The 2026–27 Big Ten men's ice hockey season will be the 37th season of play for the Big Ten Conference's men's ice hockey division and will take place during the 2026–27 NCAA Division I men's ice hockey season. The regular season began on October 2, 2026, and will conclude on March 5, 2027.

== Head coaches ==
=== Coaching changes ===
On March 18, 2026, the University of Minnesota and former head coach Bob Motzko mutually agreed to part ways, ending his eight-year tenure with the team. On March 24, 2026, Brett Larson was named head coach for Minnesota.

=== Records ===
Team	Head coach	Season at school	Record at school	Big Ten record
Michigan	Brandon Naurato	5	98–50–10	52–37–7
Michigan State	Adam Nightingale	5	94–43–11	57–29–10
Minnesota	Brett Larson	1	0–0–0	0–0–0
Notre Dame	Brock Sheahan	2	9–23–5	5–17–2
Ohio State	Steve Rohlik	14	235–198–47	116–159–24
Penn State	Guy Gadowsky	16	252–214–34	116–138–25
Wisconsin	Mike Hastings	4	63–46–7	37–33–2

== Preseason ==
Big Ten conference standings were selected by conference head coaches on September 23, 2026.

=== Preseason Big Ten poll ===
Rank	Team
1	Michigan
2	Michigan State
3	Wisconsin
4	Minnesota
5	Ohio State
6	Notre Dame
7	Penn State

=== Preseason All-Big Ten ===
All-Big Ten Teams
First Team	Position	Second Team
Jack Ivankovic, Michigan	G	Luca Di Pasquo, Minnesota
Landon DuPont, Michigan	D	Evan Murr, Minnesota
Luke Osburn, Wisconsin	D	Jackson Smith, Penn State
Michael Hage, Michigan	F	Ryker Lee, Michigan State
Danny Nelson, Notre Dame	F	Gavin Morrissey, Wisconsin
Brodie Ziemer, Minnesota	F	Jayden Perron, Michigan

== Standings ==
2026–27 Big Ten ice hockey Standings
	Conference record										Overall record					
	GP	W	L	T	OTW	OTL	3/SW	PTS	GF	GA	GP	W	L	T	GF	GA
#2 Wisconsin	6	4	1	1	0	0	1	14	29	7	10	8	1	1	42	10
Notre Dame	6	3	2	1	2	0	1	9	15	25	12	5	6	1	27	44
Ohio State	4	2	2	0	0	1	0	7	13	13	10	4	6	0	29	31
#1 Michigan	3	2	1	0	1	0	0	5	13	12	10	9	1	0	52	26
#19 Minnesota	4	1	1	2	1	0	0	4	6	11	11	4	4	3	29	35
Penn State	5	0	4	1	0	2	1	4	13	20	11	2	8	1	30	43
#9 Michigan State	2	0	1	1	0	1	0	2	3	4	10	6	3	1	33	19
Championship: March 19, 2027 † indicates conference regular season champion * indicates conference tournament champion Rankings: USCHO.com Top 20 Poll; updated November 14, 2026

== Ranking ==
=== USCHO ===
Team	Pre	1	2	3	4	5	6	7	8	9	10	11	13	14	15	16	17	18	19	20	21	22	23	24	25	Final
Michigan	2	2	2	1	1	2	2	1	–	–	–	–	–	–	–	–	–	–	–	–	–	–	–	–	–	–
Michigan State	3	3	3	2	4	3	4	9	–	–	–	–	–	–	–	–	–	–	–	–	–	–	–	–	–	–
Minnesota	14	20	20	NR	18	18	NR	19	–	–	–	–	–	–	–	–	–	–	–	–	–	–	–	–	–	–
Notre Dame	NR	NR	NR	NR	NR	NR	NR	NR	–	–	–	–	–	–	–	–	–	–	–	–	–	–	–	–	–	–
Ohio State	NR	NR	NR	NR	NR	NR	NR	NR	–	–	–	–	–	–	–	–	–	–	–	–	–	–	–	–	–	–
Penn State	17	17	NR	NR	NR	NR	NR	NR	–	–	–	–	–	–	–	–	–	–	–	–	–	–	–	–	–	–
Wisconsin	6	7	5	6	2	1	1	2	–	–	–	–	–	–	–	–	–	–	–	–	–	–	–	–	–	–

Note: USCHO does not release a poll in week 12 or 26.

=== USA Hockey ===
Team	Pre	1	2	3	4	5	6	7	8	9	10	11	13	14	15	16	17	18	19	20	21	22	23	24	25	26	Final
Michigan	2	2	2	1	1	2	2	1	–	–	–	–	–	–	–	–	–	–	–	–	–	–	–	–	–	–	–
Michigan State	3	3	3	2	4	3	4	8	–	–	–	–	–	–	–	–	–	–	–	–	–	–	–	–	–	–	–
Minnesota	18	20	NR	NR	18	17	19	19	–	–	–	–	–	–	–	–	–	–	–	–	–	–	–	–	–	–	–
Notre Dame	NR	NR	NR	NR	NR	NR	NR	NR	–	–	–	–	–	–	–	–	–	–	–	–	–	–	–	–	–	–	–
Ohio State	NR	NR	NR	NR	NR	NR	NR	NR	–	–	–	–	–	–	–	–	–	–	–	–	–	–	–	–	–	–	–
Penn State	16	17т	20	NR	NR	NR	NR	NR	–	–	–	–	–	–	–	–	–	–	–	–	–	–	–	–	–	–	–
Wisconsin	6	7	5	6	2	1	1	2	–	–	–	–	–	–	–	–	–	–	–	–	–	–	–	–	–	–	–

Note: USA Hockey does not release a poll in week 12.

=== NPI ===
Team	1	2	3	4	5	6	7	8	9	10	11	13	14	15	16	17	18	19	20	21	22	23	24	Final
Michigan	–	–	–	–	1	1	2	–	–	–	–	–	–	–	–	–	–	–	–	–	–	–	–	–
Michigan State	–	–	–	–	8	6	10	–	–	–	–	–	–	–	–	–	–	–	–	–	–	–	–	–
Minnesota	–	–	–	–	29	32	26	–	–	–	–	–	–	–	–	–	–	–	–	–	–	–	–	–
Notre Dame	–	–	–	–	40	35	32	–	–	–	–	–	–	–	–	–	–	–	–	–	–	–	–	–
Ohio State	–	–	–	–	16	19	14	–	–	–	–	–	–	–	–	–	–	–	–	–	–	–	–	–
Penn State	–	–	–	–	53	53	57	–	–	–	–	–	–	–	–	–	–	–	–	–	–	–	–	–
Wisconsin	–	–	–	–	3	2	3	–	–	–	–	–	–	–	–	–	–	–	–	–	–	–	–	–

Note: Teams ranked in the top-10 automatically qualify for the NCAA tournament. Teams ranked 11-16 can qualify based upon conference tournament results.
