= 2026–27 Calgary Flames season =

National Hockey League season

2026–27 Calgary Flames
- Division: Pacific
- Conference: Western
- 2026–27 record: 10–11–1
- Home record: 6–5–0
- Road record: 4–6–1
- Goals for: 56
- Goals against: 76

Team information
- General manager: Craig Conroy
- Coach: Ryan Huska
- Captain: Mikael Backlund
- Alternate captains: Jonathan Huberdeau; Zach Whitecloud
- Arena: Scotiabank Saddledome
- Minor league affiliates: Calgary Wranglers (AHL); Rapid City Rush (ECHL)

Team leaders
- Goals: Joel Farabee (7)
- Assists: Matt Coronato; Joel Farabee (11)
- Points: Joel Farabee (18)
- Penalty minutes: Adam Klapka (45)
- Plus/minus: William Strömgren (+1)
- Wins: Devin Cooley; Dustin Wolf (5)
- Goals against average: Devin Cooley (2.89)

The 2026–27 Calgary Flames season is their 46th season in Calgary, and their 55th season for the National Hockey League (NHL) franchise that was established on June 6, 1972.

This is the last season for the Flames playing their home games at Scotiabank Saddledome before moving to Scotia Place for the 2027–28 season.

== Standings ==
=== Divisional standings ===
Pacific Division
| Pos | Team | GP | W | L | OTL | RW | GF | GA | GD | Pts |
|---|---|---|---|---|---|---|---|---|---|---|
| 1 | Edmonton Oilers | 23 | 17 | 3 | 3 | 14 | 92 | 62 | +30 | 37 |
| 2 | Vegas Golden Knights | 23 | 13 | 6 | 4 | 11 | 77 | 67 | +10 | 30 |
| 3 | Anaheim Ducks | 22 | 11 | 10 | 1 | 10 | 85 | 85 | 0 | 23 |
| 4 | San Jose Sharks | 24 | 10 | 12 | 2 | 3 | 65 | 86 | −21 | 22 |
| 5 | Calgary Flames | 22 | 10 | 11 | 1 | 9 | 56 | 76 | −20 | 21 |
| 6 | Seattle Kraken | 18 | 9 | 8 | 1 | 6 | 59 | 66 | −7 | 19 |
| 7 | Los Angeles Kings | 19 | 6 | 11 | 2 | 4 | 52 | 63 | −11 | 14 |
| 8 | Vancouver Canucks | 23 | 5 | 17 | 1 | 3 | 66 | 100 | −34 | 11 |

Updated to game(s) played on November 18, 2026. Source: National Hockey League
Rules for classification: 1) Fewer number of games played (GP, only during regular season); 2) Greater number of regulation wins (RW); 3) Greater number of wins in regulation and overtime, excluding shootout wins (ROW); 4) Greater number of total wins, including shootouts (W); 5) Greater number of points earned in head-to-head play; if teams played an uneven number of head-to-head games, the result of the first game on the home ice of the team with the extra home game is discarded; 6) Greater goal differential (GD); 7) Greater number of goals scored (GF)

=== Conference standings ===
Western Conference Wild Card
| Pos | Div | Team | GP | W | L | OTL | RW | GF | GA | GD | Pts |
|---|---|---|---|---|---|---|---|---|---|---|---|
| 1 | CE | Nashville Predators | 22 | 11 | 6 | 5 | 8 | 67 | 66 | +1 | 27 |
| 2 | CE | Utah Mammoth | 23 | 11 | 9 | 3 | 9 | 77 | 79 | −2 | 25 |
| 3 | CE | Winnipeg Jets | 22 | 10 | 9 | 3 | 8 | 67 | 74 | −7 | 23 |
| 4 | CE | St. Louis Blues | 21 | 10 | 9 | 2 | 9 | 63 | 65 | −2 | 22 |
| 5 | PA | San Jose Sharks | 24 | 10 | 12 | 2 | 3 | 65 | 86 | −21 | 22 |
| 6 | PA | Calgary Flames | 22 | 10 | 11 | 1 | 9 | 56 | 76 | −20 | 21 |
| 7 | PA | Seattle Kraken | 18 | 9 | 8 | 1 | 6 | 59 | 66 | −7 | 19 |
| 8 | PA | Los Angeles Kings | 19 | 6 | 11 | 2 | 4 | 52 | 63 | −11 | 14 |
| 9 | CE | Chicago Blackhawks | 21 | 6 | 13 | 2 | 4 | 52 | 86 | −34 | 14 |
| 10 | PA | Vancouver Canucks | 23 | 5 | 17 | 1 | 3 | 66 | 100 | −34 | 11 |

Updated to game(s) played on November 18, 2026. Source: National Hockey League
Rules for classification: 1) Fewer number of games played (GP, only during regular season); 2) Greater number of regulation wins (RW); 3) Greater number of wins in regulation and overtime, excluding shootout wins (ROW); 4) Greater number of total wins, including shootouts (W); 5) Greater number of points earned in head-to-head play; if teams played an uneven number of head-to-head games, the result of the first game on the home ice of the team with the extra home game is discarded; 6) Greater goal differential (GD); 7) Greater number of goals scored (GF)

== Schedule and results ==
=== Preseason ===
The preseason schedule was published on June 18, 2026.

2026 preseason game log: 1–2–1 (Home: 1–1–0; Road: 0–1–1)
| # | Date | Visitor | Score | Home | OT | Decision | Location | Attendance | Record |
|---|---|---|---|---|---|---|---|---|---|
| 1 | September 20 | Seattle | 4–2 | Calgary | | Cooley | Scotiabank Saddledome | 15,634 | 0–1–0 |
| 2 | September 22 | Vancouver | 1–3 | Calgary | | Wolf | Scotiabank Saddledome | 15,883 | 1–1–0 |
| 3 | September 24 | Calgary | 3–4 | Seattle | SO | Cooley | Climate Pledge Arena | 17,151 | 1–1–1 |
| 4 | September 26 | Calgary | 1–4 | Edmonton | | Wolf | Rogers Place | 16,551 | 1–2–1 |

=== Regular season ===
The Calgary Flames regular season schedule was released on July 16, 2026.

2026–27 game log

October: 6–8–0 (Home: 5–3–0; Road: 1–5–0)
| # | Date | Visitor | Score | Home | OT | Goalie | Venue | Attendance | Record | Points | Recap |
|---|---|---|---|---|---|---|---|---|---|---|---|
| 1 | October 1 | Seattle | 6–1 | Calgary | | Wolf | Scotiabank Saddledome | 18,494 | 0–1–0 | 0 |
| 2 | October 3 | Calgary | 1–4 | Vancouver | | Cooley | Rogers Arena | 16,591 | 0–2–0 | 0 |
| 3 | October 4 | Calgary | 1–6 | Seattle | | Wolf | Climate Pledge Arena | 17,151 | 0–3–0 | 0 |
| 4 | October 8 | Colorado | 7–3 | Calgary | | Cooley | Scotiabank Saddledome | 16,903 | 0–4–0 | 0 |
| 5 | October 10 | Anaheim | 4–2 | Calgary | | Wolf | Scotiabank Saddledome | 16,894 | 0–5–0 | 0 |
| 6 | October 13 | Calgary | 4–2 | Anaheim | | Wolf | Honda Center | 17,174 | 1–5–0 | 2 |
| 7 | October 15 | Calgary | 2–6 | Vegas | | Wolf | T-Mobile Arena | 16,433 | 1–6–0 | 2 |
| 8 | October 18 | Carolina | 2–3 | Calgary | | Cooley | Scotiabank Saddledome | 16,464 | 2–6–0 | 4 |
| 9 | October 22 | Minnesota | 1–2 | Calgary | | Cooley | Scotiabank Saddledome | 16,834 | 3–6–0 | 6 |
| 10 | October 24 | Detroit | 1–4 | Calgary | | Cooley | Scotiabank Saddledome | 17,779 | 4–6–0 | 8 |
| 11 | October 26 | Toronto | 2–5 | Calgary | | Cooley | Scotiabank Saddledome | 18,476 | 5–6–0 | 10 |
| 12 | October 28 | Calgary | 0–4 | Edmonton | | Cooley | Rogers Place | 17,032 | 5–7–0 | 10 |
| 13 | October 30 | Seattle | 2–6 | Calgary | | Wolf | Scotiabank Saddledome | 16,944 | 6–7–0 | 12 |
| 14 | October 31 | Calgary | 2–5 | Colorado | | Sergeev | Ball Arena | 18,089 | 6–8–0 | 12 |

November: 4–3–1 (Home: 1–2–0; Road: 3–1–1)
| # | Date | Visitor | Score | Home | OT | Decision | Venue | Attendance | Record | Points | Recap |
|---|---|---|---|---|---|---|---|---|---|---|---|
| 15 | November 2 | Calgary | 2–1 | San Jose | | Wolf | SAP Center | 13,098 | 7–8–0 | 14 |
| 16 | November 4 | Calgary | 1–2 | Seattle | OT | Wolf | Climate Pledge Arena | 17,151 | 7–8–1 | 15 |
| 17 | November 6 | Anaheim | 5–3 | Calgary | | Wolf | Scotiabank Saddledome | 17,455 | 7–9–1 | 15 |
| 18 | November 8 | Philadelphia | 3–4 | Calgary | OT | Cooley | Scotiabank Saddledome | 16,798 | 8–9–1 | 17 |
| 19 | November 11 | NY Rangers | 3–1 | Calgary | | Cooley | Scotiabank Saddledome | 17,298 | 8–10–1 | 17 |
| 20 | November 14 | Calgary | 3–2 | Los Angeles | | Wolf | Crypto.com Arena | 16,880 | 9–10–1 | 19 |
| 21 | November 15 | Calgary | 1–6 | Anaheim | | Cooley | Honda Center | 15,686 | 9–11–1 | 19 |
| 22 | November 17 | Calgary | 5–2 | San Jose | | Wolf | SAP Center | 13,876 | 10–11–1 | 21 |
| 23 | November 19 | Minnesota | 4–1 | Calgary | | Wolf | Scotiabank Saddledome | 18,300 | 10–12–1 | 21 |
| 24 | November 21 | Chicago | – | Calgary | | | Scotiabank Saddledome |
| 25 | November 23 | Calgary | – | Ottawa | | | Canadian Tire Centre |
| 26 | November 25 | Calgary | – | Pittsburgh | | | PPG Paints Arena |
| 27 | November 27 | Calgary | – | New Jersey | | | Prudential Center |
| 28 | November 28 | Calgary | – | NY Rangers | | | Madison Square Garden |

December: 0–0–0 (Home: 0–0–0; Road: 0–0–0)
| # | Date | Visitor | Score | Home | OT | Decision | Venue | Attendance | Record | Points | Recap |
|---|---|---|---|---|---|---|---|---|---|---|---|
| 29 | December 1 | Calgary | – | Detroit | | | Little Caesars Arena |
| 30 | December 3 | Buffalo | – | Calgary | | | Scotiabank Saddledome |
| 31 | December 5 | Washington | – | Calgary | | | Scotiabank Saddledome |
| 32 | December 8 | Nashville | – | Calgary | | | Scotiabank Saddledome |
| 33 | December 10 | Calgary | – | NY Islanders | | | UBS Arena |
| 34 | December 11 | Calgary | – | Philadelphia | | | Xfinity Mobile Arena |
| 35 | December 15 | Calgary | – | Buffalo | | | KeyBank Center |
| 36 | December 17 | Calgary | – | Tampa Bay | | | Benchmark International Arena |
| 37 | December 19 | Calgary | – | Florida | | | Amerant Bank Arena |
| 38 | December 22 | Calgary | – | Dallas | | | American Airlines Center |
| 39 | December 26 | Vancouver | – | Calgary | | | Scotiabank Saddledome |
| 40 | December 29 | San Jose | – | Calgary | | | Scotiabank Saddledome |
| 41 | December 31 | Winnipeg | – | Calgary | | | Scotiabank Saddledome |

January: 0–0–0 (Home: 0–0–0; Road: 0–0–0)
| # | Date | Visitor | Score | Home | OT | Decision | Venue | Attendance | Record | Points | Recap |
|---|---|---|---|---|---|---|---|---|---|---|---|
| 42 | January 2 | Calgary | – | Winnipeg | | | Canada Life Centre |
| 43 | January 3 | Calgary | – | St. Louis | | | Enterprise Center |
| 44 | January 5 | Florida | – | Calgary | | | Scotiabank Saddledome |
| 45 | January 7 | NY Islanders | – | Calgary | | | Scotiabank Saddledome |
| 46 | January 9 | Tampa Bay | – | Calgary | | | Scotiabank Saddledome |
| 47 | January 12 | Columbus | – | Calgary | | | Scotiabank Saddledome |
| 48 | January 14 | San Jose | – | Calgary | | | Scotiabank Saddledome |
| 49 | January 16 | Los Angeles | – | Calgary | | | Scotiabank Saddledome |
| 50 | January 18 | Calgary | – | Chicago | | | United Center |
| 51 | January 21 | Calgary | – | Columbus | | | Nationwide Arena |
| 52 | January 23 | Calgary | – | Montreal | | | Bell Centre |
| 53 | January 26 | Calgary | – | Toronto | | | Scotiabank Arena |
| 54 | January 28 | Montreal | – | Calgary | | | Scotiabank Saddledome |
| 55 | January 30 | New Jersey | – | Calgary | | | Scotiabank Saddledome |

February: 0–0–0 (Home: 0–0–0; Road: 0–0–0)
| # | Date | Visitor | Score | Home | OT | Decision | Venue | Attendance | Record | Points | Recap |
|---|---|---|---|---|---|---|---|---|---|---|---|
| 56 | February 1 | Vegas | – | Calgary | | | Scotiabank Saddledome |
| 57 | February 3 | Utah | – | Calgary | | | Scotiabank Saddledome |
| 58 | February 12 | Calgary | – | Utah | | | Delta Center |
| 59 | February 13 | Calgary | – | Vegas | | | T-Mobile Arena |
| 60 | February 15 | Calgary | – | Los Angeles | | | Crypto.com Arena |
| 61 | February 17 | Boston | – | Calgary | | | Scotiabank Saddledome |
| 62 | February 19 | Pittsburgh | – | Calgary | | | Scotiabank Saddledome |
| 63 | February 21 | Ottawa | – | Calgary | | | Scotiabank Saddledome |
| 64 | February 24 | Calgary | – | Utah | | | Delta Center |
| 65 | February 27 | Calgary | – | Vancouver | | | Rogers Arena |

March: 0–0–0 (Home: 0–0–0; Road: 0–0–0)
| # | Date | Visitor | Score | Home | OT | Decision | Venue | Attendance | Record | Points | Recap |
|---|---|---|---|---|---|---|---|---|---|---|---|
| 66 | March 3 | Edmonton | – | Calgary | | | Scotiabank Saddledome |
| 67 | March 5 | Chicago | – | Calgary | | | Scotiabank Saddledome |
| 68 | March 7 | Calgary | – | Winnipeg | | | Canada Life Centre |
| 69 | March 9 | Calgary | – | Washington | | | Capital One Arena |
| 70 | March 12 | Calgary | – | Carolina | | | Lenovo Center |
| 71 | March 13 | Calgary | – | Boston | | | TD Garden |
| 72 | March 15 | Nashville | – | Calgary | | | Scotiabank Saddledome |
| 73 | March 17 | Dallas | – | Calgary | | | Scotiabank Saddledome |
| 74 | March 19 | Calgary | – | Minnesota | | | Grand Casino Arena |
| 75 | March 21 | St. Louis | – | Calgary | | | Scotiabank Saddledome |
| 76 | March 23 | Edmonton | – | Calgary | | | Scotiabank Saddledome |
| 77 | March 25 | Los Angeles | – | Calgary | | | Scotiabank Saddledome |
| 78 | March 27 | Vegas | – | Calgary | | | Scotiabank Saddledome |
| 79 | March 30 | Calgary | – | Dallas | | | American Airlines Center |

April: 0–0–0 (Home: 0–0–0; Road: 0–0–0)
| # | Date | Visitor | Score | Home | OT | Decision | Venue | Attendance | Record | Points | Recap |
|---|---|---|---|---|---|---|---|---|---|---|---|
| 80 | April 1 | Calgary | – | St. Louis | | | Enterprise Center |
| 81 | April 3 | Calgary | – | Nashville | | | Bridgestone Arena |
| 82 | April 5 | Calgary | – | Edmonton | | | Rogers Place |
| 83 | April 8 | Colorado | – | Calgary | | | Scotiabank Saddledome |
| 84 | April 10 | Vancouver | – | Calgary | | | Scotiabank Saddledome |

Legend: Win (2 points) Loss (0 points) Overtime/shootout loss (1 point)

== Roster ==
Updated November 8, 2026

| No. | Nat | Player | Pos | S/G | Age | Acquired | Birthplace |
|---|---|---|---|---|---|---|---|
| 11 | (Sweden) | Mikael Backlund (C) | C | L | 37 | 2007 | Västerås, Sweden |
| 7 | (Canada) | Kevin Bahl | D | L | 26 | 2024 | New Westminster, British Columbia |
| 38 | (Canada) | Jonathan Castagna | C | L | 21 | 2026 | Etobicoke, Ontario |
| 1 | (United States) | Devin Cooley | G | L | 29 | 2024 | Los Gatos, California |
| 27 | (United States) | Matt Coronato | RW | R | 24 | 2021 | Huntington, New York |
| 86 | (United States) | Joel Farabee | LW | L | 26 | 2025 | Cicero, New York |
| 16 | (Canada) | Morgan Frost | C | L | 27 | 2025 | Aurora, Ontario |
| 92 | (Russia) | Matvei Gridin | RW | L | 20 | 2024 | Kurgan, Russia |
| 44 | (Canada) | Joel Hanley | D | L | 35 | 2024 | Keswick, Ontario |
| 29 | (Slovakia) | Samuel Honzek | LW | L | 22 | 2023 | Trenčín, Slovakia |
| 10 | (Canada) | Jonathan Huberdeau (A) | LW | L | 33 | 2022 | Saint-Jerome, Quebec |
| 43 | (Czech Republic) | Adam Klapka | RW | R | 26 | 2022 | Prague, Czech Republic |
| 37 | (Russia) | Yan Kuznetsov | D | L | 24 | 2020 | Murmansk, Russia |
| 55 | (Canada) | Jake Middleton | D | L | 30 | 2026 | Stratford, Ontario |
| 71 | (Slovakia) | Šimon Nemec | D | R | 22 | 2026 | Liptovský Mikuláš, Slovakia |
| 78 | (Canada) | Brennan Othmann | LW | L | 23 | 2026 | Scarborough, Ontario |
| 94 | (Canada) | Brayden Pachal | D | R | 27 | 2024 | Estevan, Saskatchewan |
| 19 | (Canada) | Zayne Parekh | D | R | 20 | 2024 | Nobleton, Ontario |
| 76 | (Slovakia) | Martin Pospíšil | C | L | 27 | 2018 | Zvolen, Slovakia |
| 17 | (Belarus) | Yegor Sharangovich | C | L | 28 | 2023 | Minsk, Belarus |
| 65 | (Sweden) | William Strömgren | LW | L | 23 | 2021 | Örnsköldsvik, Sweden |
| 22 | (Canada) | Ryan Strome | C | R | 33 | 2026 | Mississauga, Ontario |
| 61 | (Russia) | Aydar Suniev | LW | L | 22 | 2023 | Kazan, Russia |
| 72 | (Russia) | Maxim Tsyplakov | RW | L | 28 | 2026 | Moscow, Russia |
| 28 | (Canada) | Zach Whitecloud (A) | D | R | 29 | 2026 | Brandon, Manitoba |
| 32 | (United States) | Dustin Wolf | G | L | 25 | 2019 | Gilroy, California |

== Player statistics ==
Preseason

=== Skaters ===
Regular season
| Player | GP | G | A | Pts | +/− | PIM |

=== Goaltenders ===
Regular season
| Player | GP | GS | TOI | W | L | OT | GA | GAA | SA | SV% | SO | G | A | PIM |

== Transactions ==
The Flames have been involved in the following transactions during the 2026–27 season.

=== Key ===
† Contract is entry-level.
‡ Contract initially takes effect in the 2026–27 season.

=== Trades ===
| Date | Details | | Ref |
|---|---|---|---|
| June 27, 2026 | To Carolina Hurricanes UTA 2nd-round pick in 2026 (#51 overall); 3rd-round pick in 2026 (#68 overall) | To Calgary Flames NSH 2nd-round pick in 2026 (#42 overall) | |
| July 2, 2026 | To Minnesota Wild Blake Coleman; Olli Määttä | To Calgary Flames Jacob Middleton; 2nd-round pick in 2029; 3rd-round pick in 2027; 4th-round pick in 2028 | |

=== Players acquired ===
| Date | Player | Former team | Term | Via | Ref |
|---|---|---|---|---|---|
| July 1, 2026 | Michael Benning | Florida Panthers | 1-year | Free agency | |
| July 1, 2026 | Andreas Englund | Nashville Predators | 1-year | Free agency | |
| July 1, 2026 | Ben Jones | Minnesota Wild | 1-year | Free agency | |
| July 1, 2026 | Jake Livingstone | Charlotte Checkers (AHL) | 1-year | Free agency | |
| September 25, 2026 | Alexander Nylander | Toronto Marlies (AHL) | 1-year | Free agency | |

=== Players lost ===
| Date | Player | New team | Term | Via | Ref |
|---|---|---|---|---|---|
| July 1, 2026 | John Beecher | Florida Panthers | 1-year | Free agency | |
| July 1, 2026 | Clark Bishop | Syracuse Crunch (AHL) | 1-year | Free agency | |
| July 1, 2026 | Justin Kirkland | Minnesota Wild | 1-year | Free agency | |
| July 1, 2026 | Ryan Lomberg | Columbus Blue Jackets | 2-year | Free agency | |
| July 1, 2026 | Victor Olofsson | Vegas Golden Knights | 1-year | Free agency | |
| July 9, 2026 | Nick Cicek | Shanghai Dragons (KHL) | 1-year | Free agency | |
| July 12, 2026 | Artyom Grushnikov | HC CSKA Moscow (KHL) | 1-year | Free agency | |
| July 13, 2026 | Lucas Ciona | Wilkes-Barre/Scranton Penguins (AHL) | 1-year | Free agency | |
| July 15, 2026 | Gavin White | Abbotsford Canucks (AHL) | 1-year | Free agency | |
| July 16, 2026 | Ivan Prosvetov | Avangard Omsk (KHL) | 1-year | Free agency | |
| July 16, 2026 | Owen Say | Calgary Wranglers (AHL) | 1-year | Free agency | |
| July 23, 2026 | Parker Bell | Motor České Budějovice (Czech Extraliga) | 1-year | Free agency | |
| August 7, 2026 | Daniil Miromanov | SKA Saint Petersburg (KHL) | 2-year | Free agency | |
| September 26, 2026 | Andreas Englund | Detroit Red Wings | 1-year | Waivers | |

=== Signings ===
| Date | Player | Term | Ref |
|---|---|---|---|
| July 1, 2026 | William Strömgren | 1-year | |
| July 6, 2026 | Šimon Nemec | 5-year | |

== Draft picks ==
Below are the Calgary Flames selections at the 2026 NHL entry draft, which was held on June 26 and 27, 2026, at the KeyBank Center in Buffalo, New York.

| Round | # | Player | Pos | Nationality | College/Junior/Club team | League |
|---|---|---|---|---|---|---|
| 1 | 6 | Carson Carels | D | Canada | Prince George Cougars | WHL |
| 1 | 30 (Note: The Vegas Golden Knights' first-round pick went to the Calgary Flames as the result of a trade on March 6, 2024, that sent Mikhail Vorobyev to Vegas in exchange for Daniil Miromanov, a conditional third-round pick in 2025 and this pick (being conditional at the time of the trade). The condition – Calgary will receive a first-round pick in 2026 if Vegas does not possess their first-round pick in 2025 by March 10, 2024 – was converted when Vegas transferred their first-round pick in 2025 to San Jose on March 8, 2024.) | Jack Hextall | C | United States | Youngstown Phantoms | USHL |
| 2 | 36 | Chase Harrington | RW | Canada | Spokane Chiefs | WHL |
| 2 | 42 (Note: from Nashville via Carolina) | Tobias Trejbal | G | Czech Republic | Youngstown Phantoms | USHL |
| 2 | 55 (Note: The Ottawa Senators' second-round pick will go to the Calgary Flames as the result of a trade on March 4, 2026, that sent MacKenzie Weegar to Utah in exchange for Olli Määttä, Jonathan Castagna, a second-round pick in 2026, the Rangers' second-round pick in 2026 and this pick.) | Alan Shaikhlislamov | D | Russia | Tolpar Ufa | MHL |
| 3 | 65 (Note: The Vancouver Canucks' third-round pick will go to the Calgary Flames as the result of a trade on November 30, 2023, that sent Nikita Zadorov to Vancouver in exchange for a conditional fifth-round pick in 2024 and this pick.) | Joe Iginla | RW | Canada | Vancouver Giants | WHL |
| 4 | 100 | Egor Barabanov | C | Russia | Saginaw Spirit | OHL |
| 5 | 132 | Simon Katolicky | LW | Czech Republic | Sarnia Sting | OHL |
| 6 | 164 | Bode Laylin | D | United States | Tri-City Storm | USHL |
