= Rae Anderson =

Rae Anderson may refer to:

- Rae Anderson (squash player) (born 1953), Australian squash player
- Rae Anderson (athlete) (born 1997), Australian Paralympic athlete

== See also ==
- Ray Anderson (disambiguation)
