= Ray Anderson =

Ray orRaymond Anderson may refer to:

- Ray Anderson (athletic director), athletic director at Arizona State University
- Ray Anderson (boxer) (born 1944), light heavyweight boxer
- Ray Anderson (journalist), The New York Times reporter
- Ray Anderson (musician) (born 1952), jazz trombonist
- Ray Anderson (entrepreneur) (1934–2011), founder and chairman of Interface Inc.
- Ray Anderson (footballer) (born 1947), Australian rules footballer
- Raymond Elmer Anderson (1891–1970), Canadian politician and farmer
