= 2026–27 Wisconsin Badgers men's ice hockey season =

- Conference: Big Ten
- Home ice: Kohl Center

Rankings
- USCHO: #2
- USA Today: #2

Record
- Overall: 10–1–1
- Conference: 6–1–1
- Home: 7–1–0
- Road: 3–0–1

Coaches and captains
- Head coach: Mike Hastings
- Assistant coaches: Todd Knott; Andy Brandt; Nick Peruzzi

The 2026–27 Wisconsin Badgers men's ice hockey season is the 78th season of play for the program and 26th in the Big Ten. The Badgers represent the University of Wisconsin–Madison in the 2026–27 NCAA Division I men's ice hockey season, play their home games at Kohl Center and are coached by Mike Hastings in his fourth season.

== Previous season ==
The Badgers finished the 2025–26 season 24–13–2, including 14–10–0 in Big Ten play. Receiving an at-large bid to the NCAA tournament, the Badgers reached the National Championship game. Despite taking an early lead, the Badgers fell to Denver, finishing as National runner-ups.

== Offseason ==
=== Departures ===
All players listed as "graduated" are tentative departures unless otherwise noted.

Wisconsin departures
Name	Number	Position	Height	Weight	Year	Nationality	Reason for departure
Ben Dexheimer	4	D	5'10"	172	Senior	United States	Graduated; Signed with the Minnesota Wild
Kyle Kukkonen	9	F	5'10"	174	Senior	United States	Graduated; Signed with the San Diego Gulls
Simon Tassy	11	F	6'2"	190	Senior	Canada	Graduated; Signed with the Bakersfield Condors
Christian Fitzgerald	13	F	6'0"	185	Senior	Canada	Graduated; Signed with the Dallas Stars
Tyson Dyck	16	F	6'0"	170	Senior	Canada	Graduated; Signed with the Florida Everblades
Quinn Finley	19	F	6'0"	179	Junior	United States	Signed with the New York Islanders
Jack Horbach	22	F	5'11"	176	Senior	United States	Graduated; Signed with the Wilkes-Barre/Scranton Penguins
Aiden Dubinsky	28	D	6'0"	180	Senior	United States	Graduated; Signed with the Laval Rocket
Eli Pulver	30	G	6'1"	165	Sophomore	Canada	Transferred to Brown
Anton Castro	33	G	6'1"	181	Sophomore	United States	Left program
Blake Montgomery	47	F	6'4"	196	Freshman	United States	Signed with the Ottawa Senators

=== Incoming ===
Wisconsin incomers
Name	Number	Position	Height	Weight	Year	Nationality	Notes
Brent Solomon	3	D	6'0"	180	Freshman	United States	Champlin, MN
Dylan Compton	4	D	6'0"	194	Sophomore	Canada	Victoria, BC; transfer from Northeastern
Chase Jette	9	F	5'11"	179	Freshman	United States	Lake Forest, IL
Gavin Uhlenkamp	12	F	5'7"	170	Freshman	United States	Chanhassen, MN
Zach Wooten	19	F	6'2"	207	Freshman	United States	Apple Valley, MN; selected 116th overall in 2026
John Stout	22	D	6'2"	207	Freshman	United States	Minnetonka, MN
Talan Blanck	23	F	5'11"	178	Freshman	United States	Fond du Lac, WI
Alexis Cournoyer	30	G	6'4"	206	Sophomore	Canada	Trois-Rivières, QC; transfer from Cornell; selected 145th overall in 2025
Xander Miceli	35	G	6'5"	195	Freshman	United States	Nashville, TN
Eetu Orpana	57	F	6'1"	196	Freshman	Finland	Lempäälä, FIN
JJ Wiebusch	86	F	6'0"	185	Junior	United States	Verona, WI; transfer from Penn State

== Roster ==
As of September 25, 2026.

No.	Nat.	Player	Class	Pos	Height	Weight	DoB	Hometown	Previous team	NHL rights
2	(United States)	Luke Osburn	Sophomore	D	6' 1" (1.85 m)	185 lb (84 kg)	2006-09-09	Plymouth, Michigan	Youngstown Phantoms (USHL)	BUF, 108th overall 2024
3	(United States)	Brent Solomon	Freshman	D	6' 0" (1.83 m)	180 lb (82 kg)	2007-01-02	Champlin, Minnesota	Sioux Falls Stampede (USHL)	—
4	(Canada)	Dylan Compton	Sophomore	D	6' 0" (1.83 m)	194 lb (88 kg)	2005-01-09	Victoria, British Columbia	Northeastern (HEA)	—
5	(United States)	Zach Schulz (A)	Senior	D	6' 1" (1.85 m)	185 lb (84 kg)	2005-06-14	South Lyon, Michigan	USNTDP (USHL)	NYI, 177th overall 2023
6	(United States)	Logan Hensler	Junior	D	6' 2" (1.88 m)	196 lb (89 kg)	2006-10-14	Woodbury, Minnesota	USNTDP (USHL)	OTT, 23rd overall 2025
7	(United States)	Gavin Morrissey (A)	Junior	F	5' 11" (1.8 m)	181 lb (82 kg)	2003-02-16	Rochester Hills, Michigan	Fargo Force (USHL)	—
8	(United States)	Jack Phelan	Junior	F	6' 3" (1.91 m)	185 lb (84 kg)	2004-05-28	Hinsdale, Illinois	Sioux Falls Stampede (USHL)	DET, 137th overall 2023
9	(United States)	Chase Jette	Freshman	F	5' 11" (1.8 m)	179 lb (81 kg)	2007-04-09	Lake Forest, Illinois	Green Bay Gamblers (USHL)	—
12	(United States)	Gavin Uhlenkamp	Freshman	F	5' 7" (1.7 m)	170 lb (77 kg)	2006-03-27	Chanhassen, Minnesota	Madison Capitols (USHL)	—
14	(United States)	Joe Palodichuk (A)	Senior	D	6' 0" (1.83 m)	171 lb (78 kg)	2003-02-26	Cottage Grove, Minnesota	Fargo Force (USHL)	—
17	(United States)	Grady Deering	Sophomore	F	6' 2" (1.88 m)	209 lb (95 kg)	2005-06-19	Des Moines, Iowa	Waterloo Black Hawks (USHL)	—
18	(United States)	Adam Pietila	Junior	F	5' 11" (1.8 m)	191 lb (87 kg)	2003-01-14	Hartland, Michigan	Youngstown Phantoms (USHL)	—
19	(United States)	Zach Wooten	Freshman	F	6' 2" (1.88 m)	207 lb (94 kg)	2006-02-21	Apple Valley, Minnesota	Green Bay Gamblers (USHL)	WIN, 116th overall 2026
21	(Canada)	Ryan Botterill	Junior	F	5' 11" (1.8 m)	176 lb (80 kg)	2003-07-23	Portage la Prairie, Manitoba	Youngstown Phantoms (USHL)	—
23	(United States)	John Stout	Freshman	D	6' 2" (1.88 m)	207 lb (94 kg)	2006-04-20	Minnetonka, Minnesota	Madison Capitols (USHL)	—
24	(United States)	Talan Blanck	Freshman	F	5' 11" (1.8 m)	178 lb (81 kg)	2005-08-28	Fond du Lac, Wisconsin	Minnesota Wilderness (NAHL)	—
26	(United States)	Weston Knox	Junior	D	6' 0" (1.83 m)	181 lb (82 kg)	2004-04-06	Andover, Minnesota	Minot Minotauros (NAHL)	—
27	(United States)	Finn Brink	Sophomore	F	5' 10" (1.78 m)	185 lb (84 kg)	2005-04-06	Maple Grove, Minnesota	Madison Capitols (USHL)	—
30	(Canada)	Alexis Cournoyer	Sophomore	G	6' 4" (1.93 m)	206 lb (93 kg)	2005-12-13	Trois-Rivières, Quebec	Cornell (ECAC)	MTL, 145th overall 2025
31	(Canada)	Daniel Hauser	Sophomore	G	5' 11" (1.8 m)	165 lb (75 kg)	2004-01-29	Chestermere, Alberta	Calgary Hitmen (WHL)	—
35	(United States)	Xander Miceli	Freshman	G	6' 4" (1.93 m)	195 lb (88 kg)	2005-05-22	Nashville, Tennessee	Corpus Christi IceRays (NAHL)	—
55	(Canada)	Oliver Tulk	Sophomore	F	5' 8" (1.73 m)	174 lb (79 kg)	2005-01-19	Gibsons, British Columbia	Calgary Hitmen (WHL)	—
57	(Finland)	Eetu Orpana	Freshman	F	6' 1" (1.85 m)	196 lb (89 kg)	2007-04-17	Lempäälä, Finland	Dubuque Fighting Saints (USHL)	—
86	(United States)	JJ Wiebusch	Junior	F	6' 0" (1.83 m)	185 lb (84 kg)	2004-02-20	Verona, Wisconsin	Penn State (Big Ten)	—
91	(Croatia)	Bruno Idžan	Sophomore	F	6' 0" (1.83 m)	194 lb (88 kg)	2006-01-16	Zagreb, Croatia	Lincoln Stars (USHL)	OTT, 181st overall 2025
94	(Austria)	Vasily Zelenov	Sophomore	F	6' 0" (1.83 m)	192 lb (87 kg)	2006-02-02	Moscow, Russia	Green Bay Gamblers (USHL)	BUF, 204th overall 2024

== Standings ==
2026–27 Big Ten ice hockey Standings
	Conference record										Overall record					
	GP	W	L	T	OTW	OTL	3/SW	PTS	GF	GA	GP	W	L	T	GF	GA
#2 Wisconsin	7	5	1	1	0	0	1	17	31	8	11	9	1	1	44	11
Notre Dame	8	5	2	1	2	0	1	15	25	30	14	7	6	1	37	49
#1 Michigan	6	4	2	0	1	0	0	11	26	18	13	11	2	0	65	32
Ohio State	6	2	4	0	0	1	0	7	18	23	12	4	8	0	34	41
#9 Michigan State	4	1	2	1	0	1	0	5	6	9	12	7	4	1	36	24
#19 Minnesota	4	1	1	2	1	0	0	4	6	11	12	5	4	3	33	38
Penn State	7	0	6	1	0	2	1	4	17	30	13	2	10	1	34	53
Championship: March 19, 2027 † indicates conference regular season champion * indicates conference tournament champion Rankings: USCHO.com Top 20 Poll; updated November 21, 2026

== Schedule and results ==
Date	Time	Opponent^{#}	Rank^{#}	Site	TV	Decision	Result	Attendance	Record
Regular season
October 2	8:00 p.m.	Robert Morris*	#6	Kohl Center • Madison, Wisconsin	B1G+	Cournoyer	W 4–2	7,707	1–0–0
October 3	7:00 p.m.	Robert Morris*	#6	Kohl Center • Madison, Wisconsin	B1G+	Hauser	W 1–0	8,853	2–0–0
October 9	7:00 p.m.	at #19 Minnesota State*	#7	Mayo Clinic Health System Event Center • Mankato, Minnesota	Midoc Sports+	Cournoyer	W 4–0	4,074	3–0–0
October 10	6:00 p.m.	at #19 Minnesota State*	#7	Mayo Clinic Health System Event Center • Mankato, Minnesota	Midoc Sports+	Hauser	W 4–1	4,024	4–0–0
October 24	5:00 p.m.	at #5 Western Michigan*	#6	Lawson Arena • Kalamazoo, Michigan (Exhibition)		Cournoyer	W 4–0	3,140	—
October 30	7:00 p.m.	Notre Dame	#2	Kohl Center • Madison, Wisconsin	B1G+	Cournoyer	W 7–1	8,525	5–0–0 (1–0–0)
October 31	5:00 p.m.	Notre Dame	#2	Kohl Center • Madison, Wisconsin	B1G+	Hauser	W 9–1	8,939	6–0–0 (2–0–0)
November 5	7:00 p.m.	at #18 Minnesota	#1	3M Arena at Mariucci • Minneapolis, Minnesota (Rivalry)	BTN	Cournoyer	T 1–1 ^{OT}	8,604	6–0–1 (2–0–1)
November 7	7:00 p.m.	at #18 Minnesota	#1	3M Arena at Mariucci • Minneapolis, Minnesota (Rivalry)	B1G+	Hauser	W 6–0	10,473	7–0–1 (3–0–1)
November 13	7:00 p.m.	Ohio State	#1	Kohl Center • Madison, Wisconsin	B1G+	Cournoyer	W 5–2	10,091	8–0–1 (4–0–1)
November 14	6:00 p.m.	Ohio State	#1	Kohl Center • Madison, Wisconsin	B1G+	Cournoyer	L 1–2	12,193	8–1–1 (4–1–1)
November 20	7:00 p.m.	Penn State	#2	Kohl Center • Madison, Wisconsin	B1G+	Cournoyer	W 2–1	8,861	9–1–1 (5–1–1)
November 21	6:00 p.m.	Penn State	#2	Kohl Center • Madison, Wisconsin	B1G+	Hauser	W 4–3	10,770	10–1–1 (6–1–1)
November 28	6:00 p.m.	Canisius*		Kohl Center • Madison, Wisconsin	B1G+				
November 29	5:00 p.m.	Canisius*		Kohl Center • Madison, Wisconsin	B1G+				
December 4	7:30 p.m.	at Michigan		Yost Ice Arena • Ann Arbor, Michigan	BTN				
December 5	6:00 p.m.	at Michigan		Yost Ice Arena • Ann Arbor, Michigan	B1G+				
December 10	7:00 p.m.	Omaha*		Kohl Center • Madison, Wisconsin	B1G+				
December 11	8:00 p.m.	Omaha*		Kohl Center • Madison, Wisconsin	B1G+				
Holiday Face–Off
December 29	7:30 p.m.	vs. Northern Michigan*		Fiserv Forum • Milwaukee, Wisconsin (Holiday Face–Off Semifinal)	B1G+				
December 30	7:30 p.m.	vs. Arizona State / UMass*		Fiserv Forum • Milwaukee, Wisconsin (Holiday Face–Off)	B1G+				
Regular season
January 8	7:00 p.m.	Michigan State		Kohl Center • Madison, Wisconsin	B1G+				
January 9	7:30 p.m.	Michigan State		Kohl Center • Madison, Wisconsin	BTN				
January 21	5:00 p.m.	at Penn State		Pegula Ice Arena • University Park, Pennsylvania	BTN				
January 22	TBA	at Penn State		Pegula Ice Arena • University Park, Pennsylvania	B1G+				
January 29	5:30 p.m.	at Ohio State		Value City Arena • Columbus, Ohio	B1G+				
January 30	4:00 p.m.	at Ohio State		Value City Arena • Columbus, Ohio	B1G+				
February 5	7:30 p.m.	Minnesota		Kohl Center • Madison, Wisconsin (Rivalry)	FS1				
February 7	7:00 p.m.	Minnesota		Kohl Center • Madison, Wisconsin (Rivalry)	BTN				
February 12	6:00 p.m.	at Michigan State		Munn Ice Arena • East Lansing, Michigan	B1G+				
February 13	5:00 p.m.	at Michigan State		Munn Ice Arena • East Lansing, Michigan	B1G+				
February 18	7:00 p.m.	Michigan		Kohl Center • Madison, Wisconsin	BTN				
February 20	6:00 p.m.	Michigan		Lambeau Field • Green Bay, Wisconsin (Frozen Tundra Faceoff)	BTN				
March 4	6:00 p.m.	at Notre Dame		Compton Family Ice Arena • Notre Dame, Indiana	B1G+				
March 5	6:00 p.m.	at Notre Dame		Compton Family Ice Arena • Notre Dame, Indiana	B1G+				
*Non-conference game. ^{#}Rankings from USCHO.com Poll. All times are in Central Time. Source:

== 2026 NHL entry draft ==
The following player was selected in the 2026 NHL entry draft:

Round	Pick	Position	Player	NHL team
4	116	LW	Zach Wooten	Winnipeg Jets

== Rankings ==
Poll	Week																											
Poll	Pre	1	2	3	4	5	6	7	8	9	10	11	12	13	14	15	16	17	18	19	20	21	22	23	24	25	26	27 (Final)
USCHO.com	6	7	5	6	2 (1)	1 (37)	1 (44)	2 (9)																				
USA Hockey	6	7	5	6	2	1 (29)	1 (30)	2 (2)																				
