= Carson Carels =

Canadian ice hockey player (born 2008)

- Born: June 23, 2008 (age 18) Cypress River, Manitoba, Canada
- Height: 6 ft 2 in (188 cm)
- Weight: 198 lb (90 kg; 14 st 2 lb)
- Position: Defence
- Shoots: Left
- NCAA team: North Dakota Fighting Hawks
- NHL draft: 6th overall, 2026; Calgary Flames

Carson Carels (born June 23, 2008) is a Canadian ice hockey player who is a defenceman for the North Dakota Fighting Hawks of the NCAA. He was drafted sixth overall by the Calgary Flames in the 2026 NHL entry draft.

== Playing career ==
After showing promise as an ice hockey player from a young age, Carels enrolled at the Pilot Mound Hockey Academy prior to ninth grade. Playing with their U15 team in 2021–22, he posted 19 points in 26 games played. The next season, he appeared in 20 games for the U15 team and scored 32 points. He also appeared in two games for the U17 team and scored two points in the 2022–23 season. After his performance in the 2022–23 season, Carels was selected by the Prince George Cougars with the 15th overall pick in the Western Hockey League (WHL) draft. He played with the Pilot Mound U17 team for most of the 2023–24 season, posting 50 points in 27 games while being named his team's most valuable player and a league all-star. Carels also then played in seven games for Prince George, posting three assists. He participated at the WHL Cup for Team Manitoba, helping them to the title while being named the tournament MVP.

As a rookie for the Cougars in 2024–25 season, Carels was named the Cougars rookie of the year after tallying 35 points in 60 games played. Entering the 2025–26 season, he was named an alternate captain for Prince George, becoming, at age 17, one of the youngest alternate captains in the WHL.

Carels announced his commitment to play for the North Dakota Fighting Hawks beginning in the 2026–27 season on May 18, 2026.

Carels was regarded as a top prospect for the 2026 NHL entry draft; he was ultimately selected sixth overall by the Calgary Flames.

== International play ==
Medal record

Men's ice hockey

Representing Canada

World Junior Championships
Bronze medal – third place	2026 United States	

Carels helped Team Canada Red to a silver medal at the 2024 World U-17 Hockey Challenge. He also participated at the 2025 IIHF World U18 Championships, scoring one goal in seven games. He competed at the 2025 Hlinka Gretzky Cup for Canada and tallied an assist.

In December 2025, he was selected to represent Canada at the 2026 World Junior Ice Hockey Championships. During the tournament he recorded one assist in five games and won a bronze medal.

== Personal life ==
Carels was born on June 23, 2008, in Cypress River, Manitoba. He grew up on his family's farm, which has about 1000 cattle and 150 goats among other animals, and he is one of five children. His father and four siblings each played ice hockey, with Carels first skating at age four.

During the COVID-19 pandemic, his family built a hockey rink on their farm so that they could continue playing.

== Career statistics ==
=== Regular season and playoffs ===
			Regular season					Playoffs
Season	Team	League	GP	G	A	Pts	PIM	GP	G	A	Pts	PIM
2023–24	Prince George Cougars	WHL	7	0	3	3	2	—	—	—	—	—
2024–25	Prince George Cougars	WHL	60	6	29	35	42	7	1	3	4	6
2025–26	Prince George Cougars	WHL	58	20	53	73	66	10	1	9	10	4
WHL totals			125	26	85	111	110	17	2	12	14	10

Awards and achievements
Preceded by Cullen Potter	Calgary Flames first-round draft pick 2026	Succeeded by Jack Hextall
