= Final Five =

Final Five may refer to:

- Final Five (Battlestar Galactica), a group of humanoid Cylons in the 2004 television series Battlestar Galactica
- Final Five (gymnastics), the US women's gymnastics team at the 2016 Summer Olympics
- Final Five Voting, a five-candidate variant of the Top-four primary
