= 2026–27 NCAA Division I men's ice hockey season =

- Duration: October 2, 2026– April 10, 2027
- NCAA tournament: 2027
- National championship: Capital One Arena; Washington, D.C.

The 2026–27 NCAA Division I men's ice hockey season is scheduled to begin on October 2, 2026, and conclude with the NCAA championship on April 10, 2027. This will be the 79th season in which an NCAA ice hockey championship will be held, and will be US college hockey's 133rd year overall.

== Maryville ==
On March 4, 2026, Maryville University officially announced that they will be elevating their teams to the NCAA Division I level beginning in the 2027–28 season. The Saints will play a transitional hybrid schedule for the 2026–27 season.

== Regular season ==
=== Standings ===
2026–27 Atlantic Hockey America standings
	Conference record										Overall record					
	GP	W	L	T	OW	OL	SW	PTS	GF	GA	GP	W	L	T	GF	GA
#16 Army	8	7	1	0	0	0	0	21	25	9	10	8	2	0	31	16
Bentley	8	5	3	0	1	1	0	15	24	16	12	6	6	0	28	31
Sacred Heart	6	3	3	0	0	0	0	9	16	18	12	6	6	0	35	39
Holy Cross	8	3	5	0	0	0	0	9	21	24	14	5	9	0	34	47
Air Force	6	3	3	0	0	1	0	8	12	15	12	5	7	0	30	39
RIT	7	2	5	0	0	2	0	8	15	20	12	3	8	1	25	40
Niagara	4	2	2	0	0	0	0	6	13	12	12	6	5	1	33	34
Robert Morris	4	1	3	0	0	0	0	3	6	15	11	4	7	0	24	34
Canisius	3	1	2	0	1	0	0	2	9	12	11	4	6	1	30	38
Championship: March 20, 2027 † indicates conference regular season champion (DeGregorio Trophy) * indicates conference tournament champion (Riley Trophy); Rankings: USCHO.com Top 20 Poll; updated September 22, 2026

2026–27 Big Ten ice hockey Standings
	Conference record										Overall record					
	GP	W	L	T	OTW	OTL	3/SW	PTS	GF	GA	GP	W	L	T	GF	GA
#2 Wisconsin	7	5	1	1	0	0	1	17	31	8	11	9	1	1	44	11
Notre Dame	8	5	2	1	2	0	1	15	25	30	14	7	6	1	37	49
#1 Michigan	6	4	2	0	1	0	0	11	26	18	13	11	2	0	65	32
Ohio State	6	2	4	0	0	1	0	7	18	23	12	4	8	0	34	41
#9 Michigan State	4	1	2	1	0	1	0	5	6	9	12	7	4	1	36	24
#19 Minnesota	4	1	1	2	1	0	0	4	6	11	12	5	4	3	33	38
Penn State	7	0	6	1	0	2	1	4	17	30	13	2	10	1	34	53
Championship: March 19, 2027 † indicates conference regular season champion * indicates conference tournament champion Rankings: USCHO.com Top 20 Poll; updated November 21, 2026

2026–27 Central Collegiate Hockey Association standings
	Conference record										Overall record					
	GP	W	L	T	OTW	OTL	SW	PTS	GF	GA	GP	W	L	T	GF	GA
Bowling Green	2	2	0	0	0	0	0	6	10	4	8	4	4	0	26	24
#10 Augustana	2	2	0	0	0	0	0	6	16	1	8	7	0	1	33	13
Bemidji State	2	1	0	1	0	0	1	5	10	5	7	2	4	1	19	21
Ferris State	4	1	2	1	0	0	0	4	8	14	8	1	5	2	14	34
Lake Superior State	4	0	2	2	0	0	1	3	8	14	8	2	4	2	22	31
Minnesota State	2	0	0	2	0	0	1	3	4	4	8	2	4	2	15	25
#15 Michigan Tech	2	1	1	0	0	0	0	3	4	3	8	6	2	0	23	15
Northern Michigan	2	0	2	0	0	0	0	0	1	16	8	2	6	0	14	34
Championship: March 19, 2027 † indicates conference regular-season champion (MacNaughton Cup) * indicates conference tournament champion (Mason Cup); Rankings: USCHO.com Top 20 Poll; updated September 22, 2026

2026–27 NCAA Division I Independent ice hockey standings
	Overall record					
	GP	W	L	T	GF	GA
Alaska	8	1	7	0	7	32
Alaska Anchorage	8	1	7	0	16	41
Lindenwood	8	3	5	0	35	39
Long Island	9	2	7	0	25	44
Maryville	1	1	0	0	3	2
Stonehill	7	3	4	0	14	20
Championship: March 7, 2027 * indicates tournament champion Rankings: USCHO.com Top 20 Poll; updated November 4, 2026

2026–27 ECAC Hockey Standings
	Conference record										Overall record					
	GP	W	L	T	OTW	OTL	SW	PTS	GF	GA	GP	W	L	T	GF	GA
#6 Dartmouth	4	4	0	0	0	0	0	12	16	7	6	6	0	0	26	7
Yale	5	3	2	0	1	0	0	8	12	14	5	3	2	0	12	14
#8 Quinnipiac	4	3	1	0	1	0	0	8	15	9	11	8	3	0	50	28
Colgate	4	2	2	0	0	1	0	7	15	10	12	3	9	0	27	36
Brown	5	2	3	0	0	0	0	6	9	11	5	2	3	0	9	11
Harvard	4	2	2	0	1	1	0	6	10	12	7	4	3	0	20	22
Union	4	2	2	0	0	0	0	6	12	14	11	6	5	0	41	32
Clarkson	2	2	0	0	0	0	0	6	10	2	10	5	4	1	28	23
St. Lawrence	2	1	0	1	0	0	1	5	4	3	6	1	4	1	16	23
Cornell	4	1	3	0	0	0	0	3	6	12	6	2	4	0	13	17
Rensselaer	4	0	3	1	0	0	0	1	8	15	12	4	7	1	31	35
Princeton	4	0	4	0	0	1	0	1	8	16	6	2	4	0	14	18
Championship: March 20, 2027 † indicates conference regular season champion (Cleary Cup) * indicates conference tournament champion (Whitelaw Cup); Rankings: USCHO.com Top 20 Poll; updated November 16, 2026

2026–27 Hockey East Standings
	Conference record										Overall record					
	GP	W	L	T	OTW	OTL	SW	PTS	GF	GA	GP	W	L	T	GF	GA
#13т Boston University	6	4	2	0	2	1	0	11	23	15	8	6	2	0	29	16
Vermont	4	3	1	0	1	1	0	9	9	7	7	4	3	0	12	13
#17 Merrimack	3	1	0	2	0	0	1	6	13	12	8	5	1	2	36	27
#11 Providence	2	2	0	0	0	0	0	6	8	2	6	5	1	0	22	11
Connecticut	4	1	2	1	1	0	1	4	17	20	8	3	4	1	26	32
Massachusetts	1	1	0	0	0	0	0	3	4	1	9	4	4	1	23	23
#13т Northeastern	3	1	2	0	1	1	0	3	7	10	5	3	2	0	16	12
Boston College	2	1	1	0	1	1	0	3	6	6	7	2	4	1	19	21
New Hampshire	3	0	2	1	0	1	0	2	7	9	8	3	4	1	18	23
#20 Maine	2	0	2	0	0	1	0	1	4	10	8	4	4	0	22	19
Massachusetts Lowell	2	0	2	0	0	0	0	0	2	8	8	2	6	0	21	29
Championship: March 20, 2027 † indicates regular season champion * indicates conference tournament champion (Lamoriello Trophy); Rankings: USCHO Division I Men's Poll; updated September 22, 2026

2026–27 National Collegiate Hockey Conference Standings
	Conference record										Overall record					
	GP	W	L	T	OTW	OTL	SW	PTS	GF	GA	GP	W	L	T	GF	GA
#5 Minnesota Duluth	6	4	2	0	0	0	0	12	16	9	14	9	3	2	47	22
#3 Denver	4	4	0	0	1	0	0	11	13	5	12	9	2	1	47	24
#7 North Dakota	4	3	0	1	0	0	0	10	14	5	11	7	3	1	40	25
#18 Miami	6	3	3	0	0	0	0	9	13	16	12	8	4	0	35	26
Omaha	6	2	3	1	0	0	1	8	16	17	10	4	5	1	30	29
#4 Western Michigan	4	2	1	1	1	0	1	7	12	10	11	8	2	1	52	21
Arizona State	4	1	3	0	0	1	0	4	7	11	10	5	5	0	33	32
#12 Colorado College	4	1	3	0	0	1	0	4	9	13	12	7	4	1	39	24
St. Cloud State	6	1	4	1	0	0	0	4	9	19	11	3	7	1	23	35
St. Thomas	4	1	3	0	0	0	0	3	7	11	10	4	6	0	25	29
Championship: March 19, 2027 † indicates conference regular season champion (Penrose Cup) * indicates conference tournament champion (National Cup); Rankings: USCHO.com Top 20 Poll; updated November 16, 2026

== NPI Rankings ==
In 2025, the NCAA announced that they would stop using the PairWise rankings for determining at-large bids to the NCAA tournament in favor of the NCAA Power Index (NPI).

The methodology was announced as follows:

- Win percentage / Strength of Schedule – 25%/75%
- Home-Away Win/Loss – 1.2/0.8 (regular season), 1.0/1.0 (postseason)
- Quality Win Base – 51
- Quality Win Multiplier – 0.5
- Overtime – 60/40 (regular season), 100/0 (postseason)
- Minimum Wins – 12

The final criteria, minimum wins, refers to the number of wins that must be retained in a team's ranking. According to the new system, games that are rated as being below a certain value threshold (e.g. defeating a club 40 places lower in the rankings) are removed from the calculations in order to prevent the numbers from becoming too skewed. Rather than being rewarded or punished for losing to a far stronger or defeating a far inferior opponent, the game is simply not counted in the rankings for one or both teams.

As part of the change, the NCAA selection committee eliminated several criteria that had been use by the PairWise: Ratings Points Index (a measurement of success against opponents weighted by strength of schedule), common opponents and head-to-head matches. Additionally, the committee did not retain the requirement that the teams must have at least a .500 record in order to be considered for an at-large bid.

NCAA Division I Men's Hockey NPI Rankings
Rank	Team	NPI	SOS	QWB	Conference
1	Dartmouth	63.466	50.287	0.751	ECAC Hockey
2	Michigan	61.616	51.088	1.044	Big Ten
3	Wisconsin	59.389	50.999	0.222	Big Ten
4	Augustana	58.291	52.192	0.726	CCHA
5	Quinnipiac	58.008	52.380	0.668	ECAC Hockey
6	Western Michigan	57.275	50.714	0.439	NCHC
7	Providence	57.206	50.446	0.289	Hockey East
8	Minnesota Duluth	57.007	50.434	0.558	NCHC
9	Army	56.829	50.005	0.243	AHA
10	Michigan State	56.445	51.342	0.388	Big Ten
11	Northeastern	56.382	49.439	0.000	Hockey East
12	Denver	55.938	50.431	0.032	NCHC
13	Colorado College	55.740	51.173	0.343	NCHC
14	Ohio State	55.284	55.293	1.214	Big Ten
15	North Dakota	55.213	50.057	0.362	NCHC
16	Union	54.941	50.433	0.450	ECAC Hockey
17	Boston University	54.320	52.047	0.563	Hockey East
18	Maine	54.134	51.550	0.471	Hockey East
19	Harvard	53.692	51.383	0.311	ECAC Hockey
20	Vermont	53.177	51.923	0.272	Hockey East
21	Michigan Tech	52.893	49.878	0.302	CCHA
22	Miami	52.537	48.943	0.322	NCHC
23	Merrimack	52.495	52.029	0.012	Hockey East
24	Bowling Green	51.761	50.654	0.000	CCHA
25	New Hampshire	51.608	50.945	0.254	Hockey East
26	Minnesota	51.512	52.034	0.634	Big Ten
27	Omaha	51.477	52.028	0.222	NCHC
28	Clarkson	50.840	50.320	0.228	ECAC Hockey
29	Yale	50.634	50.724	0.199	ECAC Hockey
30	Niagara	50.556	50.827	0.147	AHA
31	Minnesota State	50.281	50.121	0.029	CCHA
32	Notre Dame	50.262	53.137	0.237	Big Ten
33	Arizona State	50.128	49.332	0.073	NCHC
34	Boston College	49.757	52.036	0.373	Hockey East
35	Massachusetts	49.731	52.171	0.433	Hockey East
36	Sacred Heart	49.727	50.041	0.159	AHA
37	Bentley	49.557	49.901	0.078	AHA
38	Connecticut	49.314	54.340	0.575	Hockey East
39	Northern Michigan	49.248	51.926	0.115	CCHA
40	Brown	48.688	51.583	0.000	ECAC Hockey
41	Holy Cross	48.534	52.527	0.067	AHA
42	St. Cloud State	48.399	51.659	0.109	NCHC
43	Lake Superior State	48.248	48.800	0.109	CCHA
44	Princeton	48.109	49.428	0.069	ECAC Hockey
45	Rensselaer	47.772	49.546	0.166	ECAC Hockey
46	RIT	47.301	50.788	0.000	AHA
47	Air Force	47.194	50.321	0.191	AHA
48	Massachusetts Lowell	47.090	50.344	0.139	Hockey East
49	Alaska	46.755^	52.811	0.068	Independent
50	Robert Morris	46.751	48.754	0.000	AHA
51	Lindenwood	46.566	51.226	0.129	Independent
52	St. Thomas	46.561	49.959	0.092	CCHA
53	Ferris State	45.617	51.673	0.267	CCHA
54	Cornell	45.581	51.251	0.000	ECAC Hockey
55	Canisius	45.345	46.327	0.000	AHA
56	Colgate	44.543	49.886	0.095	ECAC Hockey
57	Penn State	44.340^	51.616	0.028	Big Ten
58	Bemidji State	43.801	51.734	0.000	CCHA
59	Stonehill	43.544	47.452	0.000	Independent
60	St. Lawrence	43.540	48.900	0.343	ECAC Hockey
61	Alaska Anchorage	41.908^	52.801	0.053	Independent
62	Long Island	41.483^	49.464	0.000	Independent
* A team's NPI has been adjusted to remove negative effect from defeating a weak opponent^ A team's NPI has been adjusted to remove positive effects from losing to a strong opponent Note: A team's record is based only on games against other Division I hockey schools which are eligible for the NCAA Tournament; Updated November 16, 2026

== Player stats ==
=== Scoring leaders ===
Player	Class	Team	GP	G	A	Pts	PIM
Michael Hage	Junior	Michigan	13	5	21	26	15
Jayden Perron	Senior	Michigan	13	14	11	25	22
Zam Plante	Junior	Minnesota Duluth	16	9	12	21	2
Ty Hanson	Junior	Minnesota Duluth	16	11	9	20	0
Ethan Wyttenbach	Sophomore	Quinnipiac	13	6	14	20	4
Leonid Bulgakov	Sophomore	Augustana	14	12	6	18	2
Nick Ring	Senior	New Hampshire	14	7	11	18	8
Logan Sawyer	Junior	Providence	12	6	12	18	6
Jayson Shaugabay	Junior	Minnesota Duluth	16	2	16	18	0
Lucas Van Vliet	Sophomore	St. Thomas	12	13	4	17	6

As of November 21, 2026
