= 2026–27 NCAA Division I men's ice hockey rankings =

- NCAA tournament: 2027
- Preseason No. 1 (USCHO): Denver
- Preseason No. 1 (USA Hockey): Denver
- NCAA Division I men's ice hockey rankings

Two human polls make up the 2026–27 NCAA Division I men's ice hockey rankings, the USCHO.com poll and the USA Hockey College Hockey poll. As the 2026–27 season progresses, rankings are updated weekly.

== Legend ==
	Increase in ranking
	Decrease in ranking
	Not ranked previous week
Italics	Number of first place votes
(#-#)	Win–loss–tie record
т	Tied with team above or below also with this symbol

== USCHO ==
	Preseason Sep 21	Week 1 Oct 5	Week 2 Oct 12	Week 3 Oct 19	Week 4 Oct 26	Week 5 Nov 2	Week 6 Nov 9	Week 7 Nov 16	Week 8	Week 9	Week 10	Week 11	Week 12	Week 13	Week 14	Week 15	Week 16	Week 17	Week 18	Week 19	Week 20	Week 21	Week 22	Final	
1.	Denver (35)	Denver (2–0–0) (39)	Denver (2–0–0) (33)	Michigan (6–0–0) (47)	Michigan (7–0–0) (49)	Wisconsin (6–0–0) (37)	Wisconsin (7–0–1) (44)	Michigan (10–1–0) (39)																	1.
2.	Michigan (6)	Michigan (2–0–0) (6)	Michigan (4–0–0) (14)	Michigan State (3–0–0) (2)	Wisconsin (4–0–0) (1)	Michigan (8–1–0) (9)	Michigan (8–1–0) (6)	Wisconsin (8–1–1) (9)																	2.
3.	Michigan State (7)	Michigan State (0–0–0) (5)	Michigan State (2–0–0) (3)	North Dakota (4–0–0)	Denver (3–2–1)	Michigan State (5–1–0) (3)	Denver (7–2–1)	Denver (9–2–1)																	3.
4.	North Dakota (2)	North Dakota (0–0–0)	North Dakota (2–0–0)	Denver (2–2–0)	Michigan State (4–1–0)	Denver (5–2–1)	Michigan State (6–2–0)	Western Michigan (8–2–1)																	4.
5.	Minnesota Duluth	Minnesota Duluth (2–0–0)	Wisconsin (4–0–0)	Western Michigan (4–0–0) (1)	Providence (5–0–0)	Western Michigan (6–1–0) (1)	Quinnipiac (7–2–0)	Minnesota Duluth (9–3–2)																	5.
6.	Wisconsin	Quinnipiac (2–0–0)	Western Michigan (2–0–0)	Wisconsin (4–0–0)	Western Michigan (4–1–0)	Minnesota Duluth (6–2–2) т	Western Michigan (6–2–1)	Dartmouth (6–0–0) (2)																	6.
7.	Quinnipiac	Wisconsin (2–0–0)	Providence (2–0–0)	Providence (3–0–0)	Minnesota Duluth (5–1–2)	Quinnipiac (5–2–0) т	Minnesota Duluth (7–3–2)	North Dakota (7–3–1)																	7.
8.	Western Michigan	Western Michigan (0–0–0)	Quinnipiac (3–1–0)	Quinnipiac (3–1–0)	North Dakota (4–2–0)	Augustana (7–0–1)	North Dakota (5–3–1)	Quinnipiac (8–3–0)																	8.
9.	Providence	Providence (0–0–0)	Minnesota Duluth (2–1–1)	Minnesota Duluth (3–1–2)	Colorado College (5–1–0)	Providence (5–1–0)	Augustana (7–0–3)	Michigan State (6–3–1)																	9.
10.	Massachusetts	Dartmouth (0–0–0)	Dartmouth (0–0–0)	Dartmouth (0–0–0)	Quinnipiac (4–2–0)	North Dakota (4–3–0)	Providence (6–2–0)	Augustana (9–0–3)																	10.
11.	Dartmouth	Boston College (0–0–0)	Boston University (2–0–0)	Michigan Tech (5–1–0)	Augustana (5–0–1)	Colorado College (6–2–0)	Dartmouth (4–0–0)	Providence (8–2–0)																	11.
12.	Boston College	Michigan Tech (2–0–0)	Colorado College (2–0–0)	Colorado College (3–1–0)	Dartmouth (0–0–0)	Dartmouth (2–0–0)	Colorado College (7–2–1)	Colorado College (7–4–1)																	12.
13.	Cornell	Cornell (0–0–0)	Cornell (0–0–0)	Augustana (3–1–0)	Michigan Tech (6–2–0)	Boston University (6–2–0)	Boston University (7–3–0)	Boston University (7–4–0) т																	13.
14.	Minnesota	Boston University (2–0–0)	Michigan Tech (3–1–0)	Cornell (0–0–0)	Boston University (4–2–0)	Michigan Tech (6–2–0)	Michigan Tech (6–2–2)	Northeastern (6–2–0) т																	14.
15.	Connecticut	Colorado College (2–0–0)	Augustana (1–0–1)	Boston University (3–1–0)	Cornell (0–0–0)	Merrimack (5–1–2)	Merrimack (6–1–2)	Michigan Tech (7–3–2)																	15.
16.	Boston University	Connecticut (0–0–0)	Boston College (0–1–0)	Connecticut (2–2–0)	Merrimack (4–1–1)	Cornell (1–1–0)	Cornell (2–2–0)	Army (8–2–0)																	16.
17.	Penn State	Penn State (0–0–0)	Connecticut (1–1–0)	Northeastern (2–1–0)	Connecticut (3–3–0)	Union (5–2–0)	Miami (7–3–0)	Merrimack (6–3–2)																	17.
18.	Minnesota State	Massachusetts (0–2–0)	Bowling Green (2–2–0)	Boston College (1–2–0)	Minnesota (2–3–1)	Minnesota (3–3–2)	Army (6–2–0)	Miami (8–4–0)																	18.
19.	Michigan Tech	Minnesota State (0–0–0)	Massachusetts (1–2–1)	Massachusetts (2–3–1)	Maine (4–2–0)	Army (5–1–0)	Northeastern (4–2–0)	Minnesota (5–4–3)																	19.
20.	Merrimack	Minnesota (0–2–0)	Minnesota (0–2–0)	Merrimack (2–1–1)	Massachusetts (3–3–1)	Connecticut (3–4–1)	Vermont (5–3–1)	Maine (6–5–1)																	20.
	Preseason Sep 21	Week 1 Oct 5	Week 2 Oct 12	Week 3 Oct 19	Week 4 Oct 26	Week 5 Nov 2	Week 6 Nov 9	Week 7 Nov 16	Week 8	Week 9	Week 10	Week 11	Week 12	Week 13	Week 14	Week 15	Week 16	Week 17	Week 18	Week 19	Week 20	Week 21	Week 22	Final	
		Dropped: Merrimack	Dropped: Minnesota State; Penn State	Dropped: Bowling Green; Minnesota	Dropped: Boston College; Northeastern	Dropped: Maine; Massachusetts	Dropped: Connecticut; Minnesota; Union	Dropped: Cornell; Vermont	None	None	None	None	None	None	None	None	None	None	None	None	None	None	None	None	

== USA Hockey ==
	Preseason Sep 28	Week 1 Oct 5	Week 2 Oct 12	Week 3 Oct 19	Week 4 Oct 26	Week 5 Nov 2	Week 6 Nov 9	Week 7 Nov 16	Week 8	Week 9	Week 10	Week 11	Week 12	Week 13	Week 14	Week 15	Week 16	Week 17	Week 18	Week 19	Week 20	Week 21	Week 22	Final	
1.	Denver (29)	Denver (2–0–0) (29)	Denver (2–0–0) (32)	Michigan (6–0–0) (34)	Michigan (7–0–0) (34)	Wisconsin (6–0–0) (29)	Wisconsin (7–0–1) (30)	Michigan (10–1–0) (31)																	1.
2.	Michigan (1)	Michigan (2–0–0) (3)	Michigan (4–0–0) (1)	Michigan State (3–0–0)	Wisconsin (4–0–0)	Michigan (8–1–0) (4)	Michigan (8–1–0) (4)	Wisconsin (8–1–1) (2)																	2.
3.	Michigan State (3)	Michigan State (0–0–0) (2)	Michigan State (2–0–0) (1)	North Dakota (4–0–0)	Denver (3–2–1)	Michigan State (5–1–0) (1)	Denver (7–2–1)	Denver (9–2–1)																	3.
4.	North Dakota (1)	North Dakota (0–0–0)	North Dakota (2–0–0)	Denver (2–2–0)	Michigan State (4–1–0)	Denver (5–2–1)	Michigan State (6–2–0)	Western Michigan (8–2–1)																	4.
5.	Minnesota Duluth	Minnesota Duluth (2–0–0)	Wisconsin (4–0–0)	Western Michigan (4–0–0)	Western Michigan (4–1–0)	Western Michigan (6–1–0)	Quinnipiac (7–2–0)	Minnesota Duluth (9–3–2)																	5.
6.	Wisconsin	Quinnipiac (2–0–0)	Western Michigan (2–0–0)	Wisconsin (4–0–0)	Providence (5–0–0)	Quinnipiac (5–2–0)	Western Michigan (6–2–1)	North Dakota (7–3–1)																	6.
7.	Providence	Wisconsin (2–0–0)	Quinnipiac (3–1–0)	Quinnipiac (4–1–0)	Minnesota Duluth (5–1–2)	Minnesota Duluth (6–2–2)	Minnesota Duluth (7–3–2) т	Quinnipiac (8–3–0)																	7.
8.	Quinnipiac	Western Michigan (0–0–0)	Providence (2–0–0)	Minnesota Duluth (3–1–2)	North Dakota (4–2–0)	Providence (5–1–0)	North Dakota (5–3–1) т	Michigan State (6–3–1)																	8.
9.	Western Michigan	Providence (0–0–0)	Minnesota Duluth (2–1–1)	Providence (3–0–0)	Quinnipiac (4–2–0)	Augustana (7–0–1)	Providence (6–2–0)	Dartmouth (6–0–0) (1)																	9.
10.	Massachusetts	Dartmouth (0–0–0)	Dartmouth (0–0–0)	Dartmouth (0–0–0)	Colorado College (5–1–0)	North Dakota (4–3–0)	Augustana (7–0–3)	Augustana (9–0–3)																	10.
11.	Dartmouth	Boston College (0–0–0)	Boston University (2–0–0)	Colorado College (3–1–0)	Augustana (5–0–1)	Colorado College (6–2–0)	Dartmouth (4–0–0)	Providence (8–2–0)																	11.
12.	Boston College	Cornell (0–0–0)	Cornell (0–0–0)	Cornell (0–0–0)	Dartmouth (0–0–0)	Dartmouth (2–0–0)	Boston University (7–3–0)	Colorado College (7–4–1)																	12.
13.	Cornell	Boston University (2–0–0)	Colorado College (2–0–0)	Michigan Tech (5–1–0)	Boston University (4–2–0) т	Boston University (6–2–0)	Colorado College (7–2–1)	Boston University (7–4–0)																	13.
14.	Connecticut	Connecticut (0–0–0)	Michigan Tech (3–1–0)	Boston University (3–1–0)	Cornell (0–0–0) т	Merrimack (5–1–2)	Merrimack (6–1–2)	Michigan Tech (7–3–2)																	14.
15.	Boston University	Colorado College (2–0–0)	Boston College (0–1–0)	Augustana (3–0–1)	Michigan Tech (6–2–0)	Michigan Tech (6–2–0)	Michigan Tech (6–2–2)	Northeastern (6–2–0)																	15.
16.	Penn State	Michigan Tech (2–0–0)	Connecticut (1–1–0)	Connecticut (2–2–0)	Merrimack (4–1–1)	Cornell (1–1–0)	Cornell (2–2–0)	Army (8–2–0)																	16.
17.	Minnesota State	Massachusetts (0–2–0) т	Augustana (1–0–1)	Boston College (1–2–0)	Connecticut (3–3–0)	Minnesota (3–3–2)	Miami (7–3–0)	Merrimack (6–3–2)																	17.
18.	Minnesota	Penn State (0–0–0) т	Massachusetts (1–2–1)	Merrimack (2–1–1)	Minnesota (2–3–1)	Union (5–2–0)	Vermont (5–3–1)	Miami (8–4–0)																	18.
19.	Merrimack	Minnesota State (0–0–0)	Bowling Green (2–2–0)	Massachusetts (2–3–1)	Massachusetts (3–3–1)	Massachusetts (4–4–1)	Minnesota (3–4–3)	Minnesota (5–4–3)																	19.
20.	Michigan Tech	Minnesota (0–2–0)	Penn State (0–2–0)	Northeastern (2–1–0)	Boston College (1–3–1)	Connecticut (3–4–1)	Northeastern (4–2–0)	Vermont (5–4–2)																	20.
	Preseason Sep 28	Week 1 Oct 5	Week 2 Oct 12	Week 3 Oct 19	Week 4 Oct 26	Week 5 Nov 2	Week 6 Nov 9	Week 7 Nov 16	Week 8	Week 9	Week 10	Week 11	Week 12	Week 13	Week 14	Week 15	Week 16	Week 17	Week 18	Week 19	Week 20	Week 21	Week 22	Final	
		Dropped: Merrimack	Dropped: Minnesota; Minnesota State	Dropped: Bowling Green; Penn State	Dropped: Northeastern	Dropped: Boston College	Dropped: Connecticut; Massachusetts; Union	Dropped: Cornell	None	None	None	None	None	None	None	None	None	None	None	None	None	None	None	None	
