= Cullen Potter =

American ice hockey player (born 2007)

- Born: January 10, 2007 (age 19) Hortonville, Wisconsin, U.S.
- Height: 5 ft 10 in (178 cm)
- Weight: 172 lb (78 kg; 12 st 4 lb)
- Position: Center
- Shoots: Left
- NCAA team: Arizona State University
- NHL draft: 32nd overall, 2025; Calgary Flames

Cullen Potter (born January 10, 2007) is an American college ice hockey player competing for the Arizona State Sun Devils in the National Collegiate Athletic Association (NCAA). He was selected 32nd overall by the Calgary Flames in the 2025 NHL entry draft.

== Playing career ==
During the 2023–24 season, Potter competed with the USA Hockey National Team Development Program (NTDP), registering nine goals and 13 assists over 35 games in the United States Hockey League (USHL).

Potter initially committed to play college ice hockey at Michigan State University but switched his commitment to Arizona State University on May 22, 2024. In his freshman year during the 2024–25 season, he tallied 13 goals and 9 assists across 35 games. At the end of the season, he was honored with a spot on the NCHC All-Rookie team.

On June 27, 2025, during the first round of the 2025 NHL entry draft, Potter was selected 32nd overall by the Calgary Flames.

== International play ==
Medal record

Representing United States

Ice hockey

World U18 Championships
Bronze medal – third place	2025 United States	

At the 2025 IIHF World U18 Championships, Potter represented the United States as part of the national under-18 team. Throughout the tournament, he made a significant impact on the ice, recording four goals and four assists across seven games. Potter played a key role in the team's overall performance, ultimately assisting the United States in securing a bronze medal at the event.

== Personal life ==
Potter is the son of Rob Potter and Jenny Schmidgall-Potter. His mother, Jenny, is a former member of the United States women's national ice hockey team and a highly decorated player with 14 international medals, including four from the Olympic Games. His father, Rob, works as an ice hockey coach.

== Career statistics ==
=== Regular season and playoffs ===
			Regular season					Playoffs
Season	Team	League	GP	G	A	Pts	PIM	GP	G	A	Pts	PIM
2023–24	U.S. National Development Team	USHL	35	9	13	22	20	—	—	—	—	—
2024–25	Arizona State University	NCHC	35	13	9	22	6	—	—	—	—	—
2025–26	Arizona State University	NCHC	24	12	14	26	16	—	—	—	—	—
NCAA totals			59	25	23	48	22	—	—	—	—	—

=== International ===
Year	Team	Event	Result	GP	G	A	Pts	PIM
2025	United States	U18	3rd place, bronze medalist(s)	7	4	4	8	4
Junior totals				7	4	4	8	4

Awards and achievements
Preceded by Cole Reschny	Calgary Flames first-round draft pick 2025	Succeeded by Carson Carels
