= Jack Hextall =

American ice hockey player (born 2008)

- Born: March 23, 2008 (age 18) Rolling Meadows, Illinois, U.S.
- Height: 6 ft 1 in (185 cm)
- Weight: 188 lb (85 kg; 13 st 6 lb)
- Position: Center
- Shoots: Right
- USHL team: Youngstown Phantoms
- NHL draft: 30th overall, 2026; Calgary Flames

Jack Hextall (born March 23, 2008) is an American junior ice hockey center for the Youngstown Phantoms of the United States Hockey League (USHL). He was drafted 30th overall by the Calgary Flames in the 2026 NHL entry draft.

== Playing career ==
Hextall began his career with the Youngstown Phantoms during the 2024–25 season, where he recorded eight goals and 26 assists in 53 games. During the 2025–26 season, he increased his production and recorded 20 goals and 38 assists in 58 games.

On June 26, 2026, he was drafted in the first round, 30th overall, by the Calgary Flames in the 2026 NHL entry draft.

Hextall has committed to play college ice hockey for Michigan State during the 2026–27 season.

== International play ==
Hextall represented the United States at the 2025 Hlinka Gretzky Cup where he recorded two goals and five assists in five games and won a gold medal. During the gold medal game against Sweden he had a goal and two assists, and was named the U.S. Player of the Game.

== Career statistics ==
			Regular season					Playoffs
Season	Team	League	GP	G	A	Pts	PIM	GP	G	A	Pts	PIM
2024–25	Youngstown Phantoms	USHL	53	8	26	34	30	3	0	1	1	0
2025–26	Youngstown Phantoms	USHL	59	20	38	58	28	4	1	1	2	0
USHL totals			112	28	64	92	58	7	1	2	3	0

Awards and achievements
Preceded by Carson Carels	Calgary Flames first-round draft pick 2026	Succeeded by Incumbent
