= Ray Anderson (athletic director) =

American college sports administrator

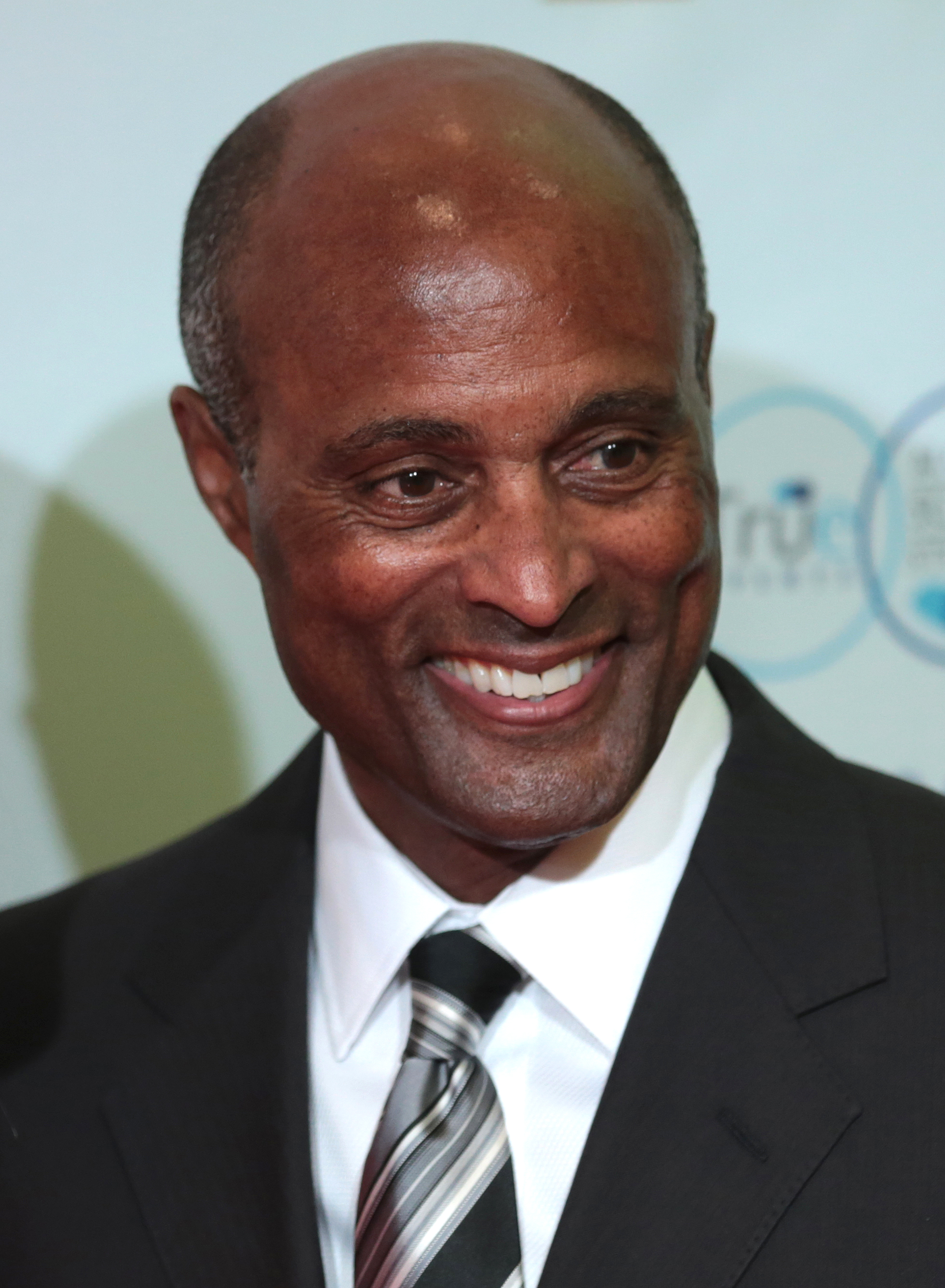
- Anderson in 2017

Biographical details
- Education: Stanford University; Harvard University

Playing career

Football
- 1973–1975: Stanford
- Position: Wide Receiver

Administrative career (AD unless noted)
- 2014–2023: Arizona State

Ray Anderson is the former athletic director and current professor of law at Arizona State University. He graduated from Stanford University, where he lettered in football and baseball, and Harvard Law School.

== Education ==
Anderson attended Stanford University. He played for the Stanford football team as a wide receiver and was also on the baseball team. He earned his degree in political science in 1976. He then graduated from Harvard Law School in 1979.

== Sports administration career ==
=== NFL ===
Before joining the Atlanta Falcons, Anderson was an agent for AR Sports. He was an agent to multiple NFL players alongside coaches. Some of the NFL head coaches he represented include Brian Billick, Tony Dungy, Dennis Green, and Herm Edwards. From 2002 to 2006, Anderson was the vice president of the Falcons. Anderson would leave to become the NFL’s senior director of football operations and was later promoted to executive vice president of football operations. Anderson announced that he would step down from vice president of football operations in 2013 to pursue new opportunities.

=== Arizona State ===
On January 9, 2014, he was announced as the athletic director of the Arizona State Sun Devils. During his time as athletic director, Anderson oversaw the $268 million renovation to Sun Devil Stadium and the construction of Mullett Arena. He also negotiated an eight-year, $38 million apparel agreement with Adidas, and added four varsity sports: men’s hockey, women’s lacrosse, triathlon, and men’s tennis. In 2016, Forbes listed named Anderson as one of the influential minorities in sports.

In February 2021, Anderson received a five-year extension that runs until 2026. That extension made Anderson the second-highest paying athletic director in the country just behind of Chris Del Conte, the athletic director of the Texas Longhorns. In 2023, Anderson was in charge when most of the Sun Devils Athletics programs transitioned conferences from the Pac-12 to the Big 12. On November 13, 2023, with the program under NCAA investigation for violations, he stepped down, in disgrace, as athletic director to become a Professor in the Sandra Day O'Connor College of Law.

==== Criticisms ====
Although he had some success as an athletic director, he has been heavily criticized by Arizona State fanbase for underperforming in major collegiate sports such as football and baseball. He has been criticized for keeping his former client and close friend, Herm Edwards, as head coach of the football team, despite being in the middle of an NCAA investigation due to recruiting violations during the COVID-19 dead period.

In 2020, Anderson was accused of ignoring sexual harassment allegations regarding an ASU booster. Former ASU employee, David Cohen filed a $1.5 million lawsuit after he said that Anderson fired him after he repeatedly ignored claims that Bart Wear, a prominent basketball booster, sexually harassed his wife and two other women. It was revealed that one of the two other women was the wife of ASU basketball head coach Bobby Hurley. On June 21, 2021 Cohen announced a federal lawsuit against the school. Despite Bobby Hurley being at odds with Anderson, on March 23, 2023 Hurley received a two-year extension as head coach. At the conclusion of the trial on December 11, 2025, David Cohen was quoted by Chris Karpman, saying, "“Ray is the most despicable and unethical person I’ve ever met in my life. He has zero care for the safety and welfare of women. It showed. He’s a pathetic human being and a liar."

Anderson has also been criticized for not retaining ASU softball head coach, Trisha Ford, who was a 2-time Pac-12 Softball Coach of the Year. She would leave and become the head coach of the Texas A&M softball program. Despite criticism and speculation, ASU president Michael Crow stated in an ESPN article on October 25, 2022, that Anderson will remain as Athletic Director.

Days after Arizona State joined the Big 12, Anderson received backlash from the West Virginia fanbase and the media for a statement he made at a press conference. He quotes "I promise I'm not going to Morgantown... I'm going to sign that to Jean Boyd. He can go to Morgantown. But send me to Texas and the rivalry with Arizona and starting a new one with BYU and Utah and Colorado." Anderson later apologized to West Virginia athletic director, Wren Baker for making the comment. In 2023, Anderson received backlash from the Sun Devil fanbase, boosters, and the media for announcing a self-imposed bowl ban for the football program just days before the season opener.

He later stepped down in November 2023, after of barrage of controversies involving him. He stated "It has been a privilege to serve as ASU's athletic director for nearly a decade."

== Personal life ==
Anderson and his wife, Buffie, have a son and a daughter.
