= Final Four College Basketball =

1985 video game

- Publisher: Lance Haffner Games
- Platforms: Apple II, Commodore 64, Atari 8-bit
- Release: 1985
- Genre: Sports

Final Four College Basketball is a sports video game published in 1985 by Lance Haffner Games.

== Gameplay ==
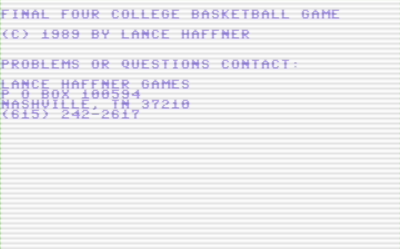
Title screen

Final Four College Basketball is a game in which college basketball is simulated in a text-only game featuring 230 teams.

== Reception ==
Rick Teverbaugh reviewed Final Four College Basketball and Basketball: The Pro Game for Computer Gaming World, and stated that "Overall, it is a well thought-out pair of games that certainly fills a void in the computer gaming world."
