= Frozen Four =

The term Frozen Four refers to the semifinals and championship games of NCAA Division I ice hockey tournaments, which are separated by gender. It could refer to:

- NCAA Division I men's ice hockey tournament
- NCAA women's ice hockey tournament
