= Jayden Perron =

Canadian ice hockey player (born 2005)

- Born: January 11, 2005 (age 21) Winnipeg, Manitoba, Canada
- Height: 5 ft 9 in (175 cm)
- Weight: 178 lb (81 kg; 12 st 10 lb)
- Position: Forward
- Shoots: Right
- NCAA team: Michigan
- NHL draft: 94th overall, 2023; Carolina Hurricanes

Jayden Perron (born January 11, 2005) is a Canadian college ice hockey forward for Michigan of the National Collegiate Athletic Association (NCAA). He was drafted in the third round, 94th overall, by the Carolina Hurricanes in the 2023 NHL entry draft.

== Playing career ==
=== Junior ===
On December 17, 2020, Perron signed a tender agreement with the Chicago Steel of the USHL. He became the fifth player to ever sign a tender with the Steel, following Robert Mastrosimone, Ryan Ufko, Jake Livanavage and Adam Fantilli. During the 2021–22 season, in his first year with the Steel, he recorded 17 goals and 28 assists in 60 regular season games. During the playoffs he recorded one goal and two assists in three games to help the Steel reach the Clark Cup finals. During the 2022–23 season, he recorded 24 goals and 48 assists in 61 regular season games. During the playoffs he recorded four goals and two assists in six games.

He was drafted in the third round, 94th overall, by the Carolina Hurricanes in the 2023 NHL entry draft.

=== College ===
On August 2, 2021, he committed to play college ice hockey at North Dakota. During the 2023–24 season, in his freshman year, he recorded 11 goals and seven assists in 39 games. He made his collegiate debut and scored his first-career goal in the season opener against Army on October 13, 2023. During the 2024–25 season, in his sophomore year, he recorded ten goals and nine assists in 31 games. He entered the NCAA transfer portal on March 31, 2025.

On April 12, 2025, he transferred to Michigan. During the 2024–25 season, in his junior year, he recorded a career-high 18 goals and 23 assists in 40 games. He ranked third on the team in scoring with 41 points. During the 2026 Big Ten men's ice hockey tournament, he recorded three goals and one assist in three games. During the championship game against Ohio State he recorded a goal and an assist to help Michigan win their fourth Big Ten men's ice hockey tournament championship. He was subsequently named to the Big Ten All-Tournament Team.

On October 2, 2026, during the 2026–27 season opener against Bowling Green, he recorded one goal and two assists in a 7–2 victory. The next day he recorded his first career four-point game, factoring into all four Michigan goals. He scored the game-winning goal as Michigan rallied from a two-goal deficit for a 4–3 win. He finished the weekend series with a national-best seven points, and was subsequently named the Big Ten First Star of the Week. On October 10, 2026, he scored his first career hat-trick in a game against Alaska Anchorage. He also extended his point streak to 10 games, dating back to the previous season. He finished the weekend series with a national-best six points, including four goals, and was subsequently named the Big Ten First Star of the Week for the second consecutive week.

== Career statistics ==
			Regular season					Playoffs
Season	Team	League	GP	G	A	Pts	PIM	GP	G	A	Pts	PIM
2021–22	Chicago Steel	USHL	60	17	28	45	10	3	1	2	3	0
2022–23	Chicago Steel	USHL	61	24	48	72	18	6	4	2	6	4
2023–24	University of North Dakota	NCHC	39	11	7	18	8	—	—	—	—	—
2024–25	University of North Dakota	NCHC	31	10	9	19	7	—	—	—	—	—
2025–26	University of Michigan	B1G	40	18	23	41	8	—	—	—	—	—
NCAA totals			110	39	39	78	23	—	—	—	—	—

== Awards and honours ==
Award	Year	Ref
College
Big Ten All-Tournament Team	2026	
