= Arizona State Sun Devils men's ice hockey =

Men's ice hockey team of Arizona State University

- Current season
- University: Arizona State University
- Conference: National Collegiate Hockey Conference
- First season: 1983–84, 2015–16 (NCAA)
- Head coach: Dave Hakstol; 1st season, 0–0–0 (–)
- Assistant coaches: Matt Greene; Jimmy Mullin
- Arena: Mullett Arena; Tempe, Arizona
- Colors: Maroon and gold

NCAA tournament appearances
- 2019

ACHA tournament champions
- 2014, 2015

ACHA tournament appearances
- 1996, 1997, 1998, 2001, 2004, 2007, 2010, 2011, 2012, 2015

The Arizona State Sun Devils men's ice hockey team is the college ice hockey team that represents Arizona State University. It plays its home games at Mullett Arena in Tempe.

The Sun Devils initially competed in the American Collegiate Hockey Association (ACHA). The team competed as an independent in NCAA Division I from 2015 until 2023 before joining the NCHC in 2024. Arizona State also maintains Division 1, 2 and 3 level teams in the WCHL and WCHC.

== History ==
Hockey began as a sport at Arizona State in the fall of 1983, with ASU students gathering at Tower Ice Plaza in Central Phoenix to play pick up hockey amongst each other. As collegiate club hockey evolved throughout the country, so did hockey at Arizona State. By the late 80s ASU was fielding a full-fledged ice hockey team competing in Division II of the American Collegiate Hockey Association. In 1993, General Manager Mike Hoffarth led the program to achieving ACHA Division I status propelling the Sun Devil hockey program into the national spotlight by qualifying for the ACHA Division I National Tournament just two years later in the 1995–96 season. Then head coach, Gene Hammett would lead the program to three straight National Tournament appearances from 1995 to 1998.

ASU qualified for 10 ACHA Division I National Tournaments since competing at the Division I level in the American Collegiate Hockey Association, and developed 12 ACHA Division I All-Americans. In the 2013–14 season, the team won its first ACHA National Championship, defeating Robert Morris University-Illinois.

On November 18, 2014, Arizona State athletic director Ray Anderson announced that the Sun Devils would move to NCAA Division I ice hockey. The transition was funded by a $32 million donation by multiple parties (including former ASU hockey players). As a transitionary season, the Sun Devils played a split schedule between ACHA and NCAA games during the 2015–16 season, before migrating exclusively to NCAA play the following season. The Sun Devils were expected to begin as an independent, but pursue conference membership in the future.

In the 2018–19 season, Arizona State received an at-large bid to the NCAA tournament for the first time in school history, in only its third season as a Division I team. They were defeated by the Quinnipiac Bobcats in the regional semifinals.

On October 6, 2020, the Sun Devils announced that for logistical reasons related to the COVID-19 pandemic, it would enter into an agreement to play all of its games as non-conference away games against Big Ten opponents, playing each of its seven hockey members four times in a 28-game season. This would assure the team a full season schedule, and avoid conflicts with the Coyotes at Gila River Arena due to the delay of the 2020-21 NHL season. The team still played as an independent, and were not eligible to qualify for the conference tournament.

On July 5, 2023, the Sun Devils announced that they will be joining the National Collegiate Hockey Conference (NCHC) starting in the 2024–2025 season. They officially became members of the conference on July 1, 2024.

On August 20, 2026, sophomore player Matthew Mayich collapsed and was hospitalized with little chance of recovery due to exertional heat stroke during a pre-season workout overseen by former Green Beret Tim Ziesel. Seven players later submitted an anonymous letter to Arizona State University President Michael M. Crow disputing the school's report on events and requesting that the team's coaching staff be placed on leave for the duration of investigations into the workout. Head coach Greg Powers was placed on paid administrative leave on September 30, 2026. Shortly before the season start on October 2 it was announced that the university had retained an independent investigator to review the incident, with Arizona Supreme Court Justice Scott Bales reviewing and making recommendations.

During the home opener on October 9, fans were given yellow ribbons with Mayich's initials and the Number 27 etched on them with the players wearing the same ribbon as a decal and hung his jersey at his stall in the locker room. The ribbon had also been used by the Toronto Maple Leafs to show their support on September 26, while they visited the home state of captain Auston Matthews.

Former North Dakota, Philadelphia Flyers, and Seattle Kraken head coach Dave Hakstol was announced as head coach on October 15, 2026, replacing Greg Powers.

== Awards and honors ==
=== NCAA ===
==== Second-Team All-Americans ====
- 2018–19: Joey Daccord, G
- 2024–25: Artem Shlaine, F

==== All-Conference teams ====
First Team All-NCHC

- 2024–25: Artem Shlaine, F

Second Team All-NCHC

- 2024–25: Noah Beck, D; Lukas Sillinger, F

Third Team All-NCHC

- 2024–25: Ryan Kirwan, F

NCHC All-Rookie Team

- 2024–25: Cullen Potter, F

=== ACHA ===
==== Division I All-Americans ====
- Steve Hammett, Forward: 1997–98
- Greg Powers, Goaltender: 1996–97, 1997–98, 1998–99
- Ian Smith, Forward: 2000–01, 2001–02 (Team USA, World University Games 2002)
- Nils Satterstom, Forward: 2000–01
- Adam Blossey, Defense: 2003–04, 2004–05 (Team USA, World University Games 2005)
- Tony Bonacorso, Defense: 2006–07, 2007–08 (Team USA, World University Games 2008)
- Joe Schweiger, Forward: 2008–09 (Eastern Michigan), 2009–10, 2010–11
- Mark Schacker, Goaltender: 2010–11, 2011–12
- Kale Dolinski, Forward: 2012–13
- Colin Hekle, Forward: 2012–13
- Ryan Clark, Defense: 2012–13
- Joe D’Elia, Goaltender: 2012–13

==== ACHA National Tournament appearances ====
1995–96, 1996–97, 1997–98*, 2000–01*, 2003–2004, 2006–07, 2009–10, 2010–11, 2011–12, 2012–15

Final Four appearances: 2013, 2014, 2015

=== Arizona State Hall of Fame inductees ===
==== Players ====
- Steve Hammett, forward 1994–1998: inducted 2009
- Greg Powers, goaltender 1995–1999: inducted 2009
- Adam Blossey, defense 2001–2005: inducted 2009
- Tony Bonacorso, defense 2004–2008, inducted 2010
- Ian Smith, Forward 1999–2003, inducted 2010

==== Executives ====
- Gene Hammett, head coach 1992–2000: inducted 2008
- Mike Hoffarth, general manager 1988–1999: inducted 2008
- Don Mullet, donor: inducted 2008
- John Wold, head coach, general manager, oversight committee 2001–present: inducted 2009
- Wayne Reid, assistant coach, director of hockey ops, oversight committee 1992–present: inducted 2009
- Doug Maire, video coach, Projects Manager Executive Hall of Fame inducted 2013, Lifetime Service Award 2014

== Arena ==
Prior to 2022, the Sun Devils played most of their home games at the Oceanside Ice Arena in Tempe. Selected games each season were played at Glendale's Gila River Arena, the former home of the NHL's Arizona Coyotes. With the move to NCAA Division I, Anderson stated they planned to pursue an on-campus arena in the future. In the meantime, Oceanside underwent a renovation for the 2015 to bring its facilities to NCAA standards.

In November 2020, the Arizona Board of Regents' finance committee approved plans to construct a new 5,000-seat indoor arena on-campus near Desert Financial Arena, which is expected to house the school's hockey, gymnastics, and wrestling programs among others. Mullett Arena opened in 2022; it also served as the Coyotes' home arena for two seasons after the city of Glendale declined to renew the team's lease at Gila River Arena.

== All-time coaching records ==
As of October 15, 2026

Tenure	Coach	Years	Record	Pct.
2015–2026	Greg Powers	11	153–162–26	.487
2026	Mike Corbett (acting)	1	2–2–0	.500
Totals	2 coaches	12 seasons	155–164–26	.487

== Team ==
=== Current roster ===
As of August 22, 2025.

No.	Nat.	Player	Class	Pos	Height	Weight	DoB	Hometown	Previous team	NHL rights
3	(Canada)	Justin Kipkie	Freshman	D	6' 4" (1.93 m)	207 lb (94 kg)	2005-07-28	Calgary, Alberta	Victoria Royals (WHL)	MIN, 141st overall 2025
4	(Canada)	Austin Zemlak	Freshman	D	6' 1" (1.85 m)	185 lb (84 kg)	2005-02-26	Fort McMurray, Alberta	Tri-City Americans (WHL)	—
5	(Slovakia)	Richard Baran	Freshman	D	6' 1" (1.85 m)	185 lb (84 kg)	2005-10-24	Bratislava, Slovakia	Des Moines Buccaneers (USHL)	—
7	(Sweden)	Joel Kjellberg	Sophomore	D	6' 0" (1.83 m)	190 lb (86 kg)	2004-04-29	Nacka, Sweden	Cedar Rapids RoughRiders (USHL)	—
9	(United States)	Anthony Dowd	Junior	D	5' 6" (1.68 m)	154 lb (70 kg)	2003-04-25	Point Pleasant Beach, New Jersey	Chicago Steel (USHL)	—
10	(United States)	Tucker Ness	Senior	D	6' 3" (1.91 m)	219 lb (99 kg)	2002-11-25	Plymouth, Minnesota	Waterloo Black Hawks (USHL)	—
11	(United States)	Lincoln Kuehne	Freshman	D	6' 2" (1.88 m)	201 lb (91 kg)	2007-11-28	Fargo, North Dakota	USNTDP (USHL)	—
12	(United States)	Cullen Potter	Sophomore	F	5' 9" (1.75 m)	161 lb (73 kg)	2007-01-10	Hortonville, Wisconsin	USNTDP (USHL)	CGY, 32nd overall 2025
14	(Canada)	Carmelo Crandell	Freshman	F	5' 11" (1.8 m)	176 lb (80 kg)	2005-03-02	St. Albert, Alberta	Tri-City Storm (USHL)	—
15	(United States)	Noah Powell	Sophomore	F	6' 2" (1.88 m)	201 lb (91 kg)	2005-02-02	Northbrook, Illinois	Ohio State (Big Ten)	PHI, 148th overall 2024
16	(Canada)	Sean McGurn	Junior	F	5' 10" (1.78 m)	170 lb (77 kg)	2002-07-30	Ottawa, Ontario	New Brunswick (AUS)	—
17	(United States)	John Waldron	Senior	F	6' 1" (1.85 m)	185 lb (84 kg)	2002-11-13	Batavia, Illinois	Miami (NCHC)	—
19	(United States)	Logan Morrell	Sophomore	F	6' 3" (1.91 m)	194 lb (88 kg)	2003-08-02	Mesa, Arizona	Michigan Tech (CCHA)	—
22	(United States)	Ty Nash	Sophomore	F	5' 11" (1.8 m)	179 lb (81 kg)	2003-05-22	Scottsdale, Arizona	Alberta (CWUAA)	—
23	(United States)	Bennett Schimek	Senior	F	6' 0" (1.83 m)	188 lb (85 kg)	2003-04-15	Mendota Heights, Minnesota	Providence (USHL)	—
24	(Canada)	Justin Cloutier	Freshman	F	5' 9" (1.75 m)	187 lb (85 kg)	2005-06-20	Ottawa, Ontario	Soo Greyhounds (OHL)	—
25	(United States)	Kyle Smolen	Junior	F	5' 11" (1.8 m)	171 lb (78 kg)	2002-06-18	Crystal Lake, Illinois	Fargo Force (USHL)	—
27	(Canada)	Sam Alfano	Freshman	F	6' 4" (1.93 m)	205 lb (93 kg)	2004-01-18	Hamilton, Ontario	Erie Otters (OHL)	—
30	(Canada)	Chase Hamm	Junior	G	5' 9" (1.75 m)	168 lb (76 kg)	2002-01-06	Saskatoon, Saskatchewan	Arizona State (ACHA)	—
31	(Slovakia)	Samuel Urban	Freshman	G	6' 0" (1.83 m)	198 lb (90 kg)	2005-05-01	Dolné Kočkovce, Slovakia	Sioux City Musketeers (USHL)	—
33	(United States)	Connor Hasley	Senior	G	6' 1" (1.85 m)	193 lb (88 kg)	2001-02-27	North Tonawanda, New York	Bentley (AHA)	—
37	(Canada)	Sam Court	Sophomore	D	5' 10" (1.78 m)	190 lb (86 kg)	2004-01-07	Winnipeg, Manitoba	Sioux City Musketeers (USHL)	—
48	(United States)	Ben Kevan	Freshman	F	6' 1" (1.85 m)	179 lb (81 kg)	2007-01-03	Fairfield, California	USNTDP (USHL)	NJD, 63rd overall 2025
49	(United States)	Braxton Whitehead	Freshman	F	5' 10" (1.78 m)	163 lb (74 kg)	2004-06-09	Palmer, Alaska	Regina Pats (WHL)	—
51	(United States)	Cruz Lucius	Senior	F	6' 0" (1.83 m)	178 lb (81 kg)	2004-04-05	Grant, Minnesota	Wisconsin (Big Ten)	PIT, 124th overall 2022
74	(United States)	Brasen Boser	Sophomore	D	5' 11" (1.8 m)	176 lb (80 kg)	2004-02-29	Minot, North Dakota	Fargo Force (USHL)	—
89	(United States)	Tony Achille	Junior	F	5' 11" (1.8 m)	173 lb (78 kg)	2002-01-08	Hingham, Massachusetts	Maine Nordiques (NAHL)	—

=== Coaches ===
==== Head coach ====
Coach Powers has been on the Sun Devil Coaching Staff for 12 years, and enters his fifth year as Head Coach of ASU's NCAA Division 1 Hockey Program. Coach Powers was a finalist for the 2019 Spencer Penrose Award, which is awarded to the NCAA Division 1 Coach Of The Year.

Prior to becoming an NCAA Division 1 hockey team, Coach Powers helped guide the Sun Devils to their first ACHA Division 1 National Championship.

During the 2018-2019 hockey season, Coach Powers and his staff led the Sun Devils to become the fastest start-up program to qualify for the NCAA Division 1 Tournament in NCAA History. The Sun Devils finished the season ranked 10th in the Pairwise rankings.

Coach Powers was a three time ACHA Division 1 All-American Goaltender while playing hockey for the Sun Devils, and graduated from ASU's Walter Cronkite School of Journalism in 1999. Powers was also inducted into the ASU Hockey Player Hall Of Fame in 2009.

==== Assistants and staff ====
- Alex Hicks – Assistant coach (former 15-year professional career, including 5 years in the NHL with the Anaheim Mighty Ducks, Pittsburgh Penguins, San Jose Sharks, and the Florida Panthers)
- Mike Field – Associate head coach (former assistant coach Division I and United States Hockey League)
- Eddie Lack – Volunteer coach (former 9-year professional career, including 5 years in the NHL with the Vancouver Canucks, Carolina Hurricanes, Calgary Flames, and the New Jersey Devils).
- Andrew Matheson – Director of hockey operations
- Jon Laughner - Coordinator, equipment operations
- Liane Blyn – Head coach, Olympic sports
- Rick Covard – Assistant athletic trainer
- Chase Drieberg - Equipment student manager

== Statistical leaders ==
=== Career points leaders ===
Player	Years	GP	G	A	Pts	PIM
Johnny Walker	2017–2022	139	70	53	123	140
Matthew Kopperud	2020–2024	118	64	43	107	111
Brinson Pasichnuk	2016–2020	136	39	68	107	170
Lukas Sillinger	2022–2025	106	28	79	107	42
Tim Lovell	2021–2024	101	12	65	77	117
Tyler Busch	2016–2020	131	26	51	77	249
Brett Gruber	2016–2020	132	23	53	76	48
Josh Doan	2021–2023	74	28	47	75	72
Demetrios Koumontzis	2018–2023	142	22	45	67	118
Anthony Croston	2015–2019	127	25	41	66	159

=== Career goaltending leaders ===
GP = Games played; Min = Minutes played; W = Wins; L = Losses; T = Ties; GA = Goals against; SO = Shutouts; SV% = Save percentage; GAA = Goals against average

minimum 30 games played

Player	Years	GP	Min	W	L	T	GA	SO	SV%	GAA
Gibson Homer	2022–2025	30	1733	16	8	4	67	2	.924	2.32
T. J. Semptimphelter	2022–present	62	3574	31	26	4	161	8	.911	2.70
Evan Debrouwer	2018–2021	51	2737	22	20	4	138	4	.908	3.02
Joey Daccord	2016–2019	82	4685	32	40	7	240	8	.913	3.07
Ryland Pashovitz	2015–2018	34	1703	6	22	1	111	0	.894	3.91

Statistics current through the end of the 2024–25 season.

== Sun Devils in the NHL ==
As of July 1, 2025

Player	Position	Team(s)	Years	Games	Stanley Cups
Joey Daccord	Goaltender	OTT, SEA	2018–present	126	0
Josh Doan	Right Wing	ARI, UTA, BUF	2023–present	62	0
Brinson Pasichnuk	Defenseman	SJS	2020–2021	4	0
Ty Murchison	Defenseman	PHI	2025–present	2	0

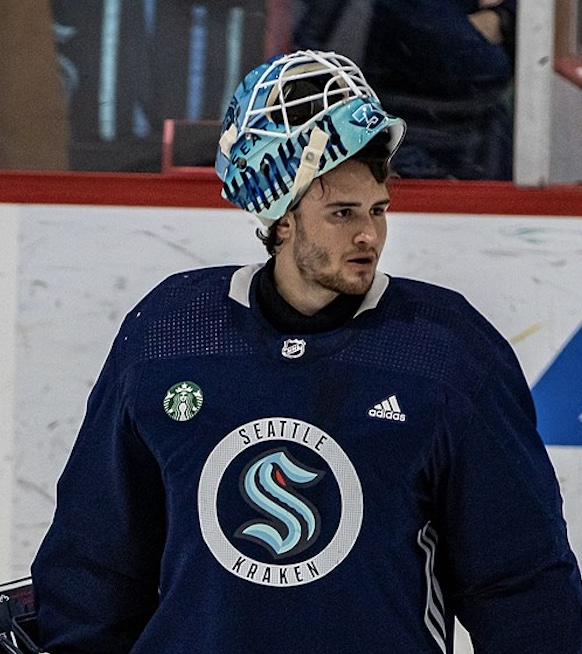
Joey Daccord
