= 2019–20 Alaska Nanooks men's ice hockey season =

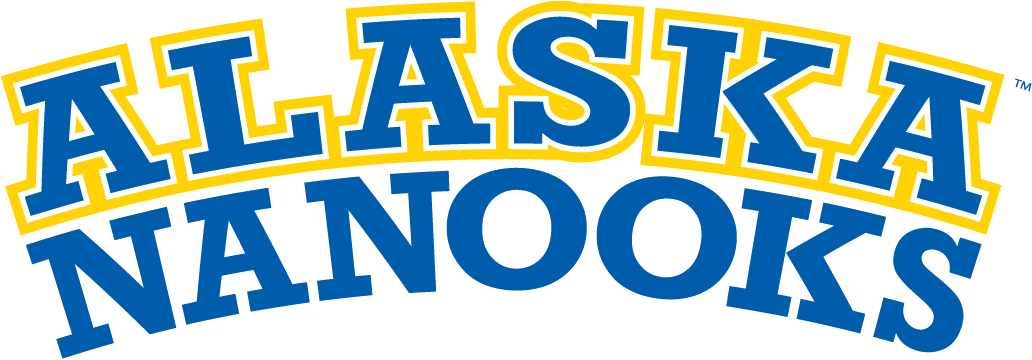
- Conference: 4th WCHA
- Home ice: Carlson Center

Rankings
- USCHO.com: NR
- USA Today: NR

Record
- Overall: 16–15–5
- Conference: 14–9–5–2
- Home: 7–9–4
- Road: 9–6–1
- Neutral: 0–0–0

Coaches and captains
- Head coach: Erik Largen
- Assistant coaches: Joe Howe; Kārlis Zirnis; Josh Erickson
- Alternate captain: Kyle Marino

The 2019–20 Alaska Nanooks men's ice hockey season was the 71st season of play for the program, the 36th at the Division I level and the 7th in the WCHA conference. The Nanooks represented the University of Alaska Fairbanks and were coached by Erik Largen, in his 2nd season.

== Departures ==
Player	Position	Nationality	Cause
Niko Della Maggiore	Goaltender	United States	Retired
Matthew Doran	Defenseman	United States	Transfer (SUNY Geneseo)
Chase Ellingson	Forward	United States	Left Program
Jake Gresh	Defenseman	United States	Transfer (Hobart)
Nikolas Koberstein	Defenseman	Canada	Graduation (signed with Kansas City Mavericks)
Ryker Leer	Forward	Canada	Graduation (signed with Visby/Roma HK)
Tony Rehm	Goaltender	United States	Transfer (Salve Regina)
Sam Ruffin	Forward	United States	Transfer (Adrian)
Chad Staley	Forward	Canada	Graduation (signed with Hamburg Crocodiles)

== Recruiting ==
Player	Position	Nationality	Age	Notes
Chase Dubois	Forward	Canada	21	Williams Lake, BC
Filip Fornåå Svensson	Forward	Sweden	20	Linköping, SWE
Emil Gransøe	Goaltender	Denmark	21	Gentofte, DEN
Didrik Henbrant	Forward	Sweden	21	Sturefors, SWE
Kristaps Jākobsons	Defenseman	Latvia	22	Riga, LAT
Roberts Kaļķis	Forward	Latvia	20	Riga, LAT
Markuss Komuls	Defenseman	Latvia	21	Talsi, LAT
Garrett Pyke	Forward/Defenseman	Canada	20	Mississauga, ON
Ēriks Žohovs	Forward	Latvia	21	Riga, LAT

== Roster ==
As of September 9, 2019.

No.	Nat.	Player	Class	Pos	Height	Weight	DoB	Hometown	Previous team	NHL rights
2	(United States)	Jack Weiss	Senior (RS)	D	5' 11" (1.8 m)	185 lb (84 kg)	1994-05-30	Bloomington, Minnesota	Rio Grande Valley Killer Bees (NAHL)	—
4	(Latvia)	Kristaps Jākobsons	Freshman	D	6' 0" (1.83 m)	202 lb (92 kg)	1996-12-25	Tukums, Latvia	HC Zemgale/LUA (LHL)	—
5	(Latvia)	Markuss Komuls	Freshman	D	5' 10" (1.78 m)	187 lb (85 kg)	1998-01-04	Talsi, Latvia	Kenai River Brown Bears (NAHL)	—
6	(Sweden)	Didrik Henbrandt	Freshman	F	5' 10" (1.78 m)	169 lb (77 kg)	1998-04-10	Linköping, Sweden	Minot Minotauros (NAHL)	—
7	(Canada)	Garrett Pyke	Freshman	D	6' 1" (1.85 m)	190 lb (86 kg)	1999-08-01	Toronto, Ontario	Oakville Blades (OJHL)	—
8	(United States)	Jordan Muzzillo	Sophomore	D	6' 0" (1.83 m)	185 lb (84 kg)	1997-03-24	Capron, Illinois	Springfield Jr. Blues (NAHL)	—
9	(Canada)	Justin Young	Junior	F	6' 0" (1.83 m)	184 lb (83 kg)	1997-12-23	Leduc, Alberta	Whitecourt Wolverines (AJHL)	—
10	(Latvia)	Ēriks Žohovs	Freshman	F	6' 0" (1.83 m)	196 lb (89 kg)	1997-11-26	Riga, Latvia	HC Zemgale/LUA (LHL)	—
11	(Canada)	Steven Jandric	Junior	F	6' 0" (1.83 m)	200 lb (91 kg)	1997-08-18	Prince George, British Columbia	Vernon Vipers (BCHL)	—
12	(United States)	Caleb Hite	Sophomore	F	5' 11" (1.8 m)	185 lb (84 kg)	1997-02-11	Grand Blanc, Michigan	Fairbanks Ice Dogs (NAHL)	—
13	(Sweden)	Filip Fornåå Svensson	Freshman	F	6' 4" (1.93 m)	205 lb (93 kg)	1999-01-05	Linköping, Sweden	Linköpings HC J20 (J20 SuperElit)	—
14	(United States)	Brennan Blaszczak	Junior	F	6' 0" (1.83 m)	180 lb (82 kg)	1996-03-12	Troy, Michigan	Springfield Jr. Blues (NAHL)	—
15	(Canada)	Troy Van Tetering	Senior	F	5' 11" (1.8 m)	180 lb (82 kg)	1997-04-26	Carstairs, Alberta	Lloydminster Bobcats (AJHL)	—
16	(Canada)	Chase Dubois	Freshman	F	5' 9" (1.75 m)	160 lb (73 kg)	1998-03-12	Williams Lake, British Columbia	West Kelowna Warriors (BCHL)	—
17	(Canada)	Colin Doyle	Sophomore	F	5' 10" (1.78 m)	185 lb (84 kg)	1998-05-12	Campbellford, Ontario	Wellington Dukes (OJHL)	—
20	(Canada)	Max Newton	Junior	F	5' 10" (1.78 m)	185 lb (84 kg)	1997-11-14	Vancouver, British Columbia	Cowichan Valley Capitals (BCHL)	—
23	(Latvia)	Roberts Kaļķis	Freshman	D	6' 1" (1.85 m)	210 lb (95 kg)	1998-12-22	Riga, Latvia	HK Rīga (MHL)	—
24	(United States)	James LaDouce	Senior	F	5' 11" (1.8 m)	213 lb (97 kg)	1995-08-24	Saginaw, Michigan	Minot Minotauros (NAHL)	—
25	(Finland)	Antti Virtanen	Sophomore	F	6' 0" (1.83 m)	185 lb (84 kg)	1998-03-14	Kittilä, Finland	Sioux Falls Stampede (USHL)	—
26	(United States)	Tyler Cline	Senior	F	5' 7" (1.7 m)	175 lb (79 kg)	1995-09-03	Blaine, Minnesota	Minnesota Wilderness (NAHL)	—
27	(Canada)	Colton Leiter	Senior	F	6' 2" (1.88 m)	200 lb (91 kg)	1996-01-16	Edmonton, Alberta	Spruce Grove Saints (AJHL)	—
28	(Canada)	Kylar Hope	Senior	F	5' 11" (1.8 m)	185 lb (84 kg)	1995-08-17	Lashburn, Saskatchewan	West Kelowna Warriors (BCHL)	—
29	(Canada)	Chris Jandric	Sophomore	D	5' 11" (1.8 m)	179 lb (81 kg)	1998-10-03	Prince George, British Columbia	Vernon Vipers (BCHL)	—
30	(Latvia)	Gustavs Dāvis Grigals	Sophomore	G	6' 2" (1.88 m)	189 lb (86 kg)	1998-07-22	Riga, Latvia	Shreveport Mudbugs (NAHL)	—
31	(Denmark)	Emil Gransøe	Freshman	G	5' 10" (1.78 m)	175 lb (79 kg)	1998-09-27	Charlottenlund, Denmark	Topeka Pilots (NAHL)	—
32	(Canada)	Tristan Thompson	Senior	D	5' 9" (1.75 m)	185 lb (84 kg)	1997-01-02	Canmore, Alberta	Brooks Bandits (AJHL)	—
33	(Sweden)	Anton Martinsson	Senior	G	6' 1" (1.85 m)	178 lb (81 kg)	1995-12-11	Klippan, Sweden	Amarillo Bulls (NAHL)	—
36	(Canada)	Kyle Marino	Senior	F	6' 3" (1.91 m)	220 lb (100 kg)	1995-06-01	Niagara Falls, Ontario	West Kelowna Warriors (BCHL)	—
37	(United States)	Logan Coomes	Senior	F	5' 11" (1.8 m)	185 lb (84 kg)	1996-11-06	Northville, Michigan	Merrimack Warriors (HEA)	—

== Standings ==
2019–20 Western Collegiate Hockey Association Standings
	Conference record								Overall record					
	GP	W	L	T	3/SW	PTS	GF	GA	GP	W	L	T	GF	GA
#2 Minnesota State	28	23	4	1	1	71	115	38	36	29	5	2	141	53
#11 Bemidji State	28	20	5	3	2	65	101	46	34	20	9	5	111	65
Northern Michigan	28	16	11	1	1	50	92	87	36	18	14	4	115	112
Alaska	28	14	9	5	2	49	73	65	34	16	13	5	84	86
Bowling Green	28	14	10	4	3	49	85	70	36	19	13	4	112	92
Michigan Tech	28	14	12	2	0	44	68	65	37	19	15	3	96	85
Lake Superior State	28	11	13	4	4	41	66	77	38	13	21	4	90	112
Alaska Anchorage	28	4	18	6	3	21	56	96	34	4	23	7	66	122
Ferris State	28	5	21	2	0	17	54	100	35	7	26	2	70	127
Alabama–Huntsville	28	2	20	6	1	13	50	116	34	2	26	6	57	145
Championship: March 21, 2020 † indicates conference regular season champion; * indicates conference tournament champion Rankings: USCHO.com Top 20 Poll; updated March 1, 2020

== Schedule and results ==
Date	Time	Opponent^{#}	Rank^{#}	Site	TV	Decision	Result	Attendance	Record
Regular season
October 5	7:07 PM	vs. #2 Denver*		Carlson Center • Fairbanks, Alaska		Martinsson	L 3–4	1,511	0–1–0
October 6	5:07 PM	vs. #2 Denver*		Carlson Center • Fairbanks, Alaska		Grigals	L 0–3	1,028	0–2–0
October 11	3:07 PM	at Michigan Tech		MacInnes Student Ice Arena • Houghton, Michigan	FloHockey.tv	Grigals	W 3–2	3,701	1–2–0 (1–0–0–0)
October 12	2:07 PM	at Michigan Tech		MacInnes Student Ice Arena • Houghton, Michigan	FloHockey.tv	Grigals	W 2–1	3,495	2–2–0 (2–0–0–0)
October 17	3:07 PM	at #9 Penn State*		Pegula Ice Arena • University Park, Pennsylvania		Grigals	L 0–7	5,898	2–3–0 (2–0–0–0)
October 18	3:07 PM	at #9 Penn State*		Pegula Ice Arena • University Park, Pennsylvania		Martinsson	W 4–0	6,146	3–3–0 (2–0–0–0)
October 25	7:07 PM	at Alaska Anchorage		Wells Fargo Sports Complex • Anchorage, Alaska (Governor's Cup)	FloHockey.tv	Martinsson	W 2–1	616	4–3–0 (3–0–0–0)
October 26	5:07 PM	at Alaska Anchorage		Wells Fargo Sports Complex • Anchorage, Alaska (Governor's Cup)	FloHockey.tv	Martinsson	L 0–4	581	4–4–0 (3–1–0–0)
November 1	7:07 PM	vs. Bemidji State		Carlson Center • Fairbanks, Alaska	FloHockey.tv	Grigals	L 0–4	1,470	4–5–0 (3–2–0–0)
November 2	7:07 PM	vs. Bemidji State		Carlson Center • Fairbanks, Alaska	FloHockey.tv	Martinsson	W 3–1	1,444	5–5–0 (4–2–0–0)
November 8	7:07 PM	vs. Arizona State*		Carlson Center • Fairbanks, Alaska		Martinsson	W 4–3	1,283	6–5–0 (4–2–0–0)
November 9	7:07 PM	vs. Arizona State*		Carlson Center • Fairbanks, Alaska		Grigals	L 0–4	1,613	6–6–0 (4–2–0–0)
November 15	3:07 PM	at #18 Northern Michigan		Berry Events Center • Marquette, Michigan	FloHockey.tv	Grigals	L 1–2	2,605	6–7–0 (4–3–0–0)
November 16	2:07 PM	at #18 Northern Michigan		Berry Events Center • Marquette, Michigan	FloHockey.tv	Martinsson	W 3–2	2,785	7–7–0 (5–3–0–0)
November 22	7:07 PM	vs. Ferris State		Carlson Center • Fairbanks, Alaska	FloHockey.tv	Martinsson	L 2–3	1,508	7–8–0 (5–4–0–0)
November 23	3:07 PM	vs. Ferris State		Carlson Center • Fairbanks, Alaska	FloHockey.tv	Grigals	W 3–1	1,475	8–8–0 (6–4–0–0)
November 29	7:13 PM	vs. Michigan Tech		Carlson Center • Fairbanks, Alaska	FloHockey.tv	Grigals	W 3–1	1,255	9–8–0 (7–4–0–0)
November 30	7:13 PM	vs. Michigan Tech		Carlson Center • Fairbanks, Alaska	FloHockey.tv	Grigals	L 1–2	1,365	9–9–0 (7–5–0–0)
December 6	4:07 PM	at Bemidji State		Sanford Center • Bemidji, Minnesota	FloHockey.tv	Martinsson	L 1–4	2,547	9–10–0 (7–6–0–0)
December 7	3:07 PM	at Bemidji State		Sanford Center • Bemidji, Minnesota	FloHockey.tv	Grigals	W 5–3	2,516	10–10–0 (8–6–0–0)
January 3	4:07 PM	at #3 Minnesota State		Mankato Civic Center • Mankato, Minnesota	FloHockey.tv	Martinsson	L 0–4	3,554	10–11–0 (8–7–0–0)
January 4	3:07 PM	at #3 Minnesota State		Mankato Civic Center • Mankato, Minnesota	FloHockey.tv	Martinsson	L 1–3	4,065	10–12–0 (8–8–0–0)
January 10	7:07 PM	vs. Lake Superior State		Carlson Center • Fairbanks, Alaska	FloHockey.tv	Grigals	W 2–0	1,250	11–12–0 (9–8–0–0)
January 11	7:07 PM	vs. Lake Superior State		Carlson Center • Fairbanks, Alaska	FloHockey.tv	Grigals	T 1–1 ^{3x3 OTL}	1,510	11–12–1 (9–8–1–0)
January 17	3:07 PM	at Ferris State		Ewigleben Arena • Big Rapids, Michigan	FloHockey.tv	Martinsson	W 2–0	1,138	12–12–1 (10–8–1–0)
January 18	2:07 PM	at Ferris State		Ewigleben Arena • Big Rapids, Michigan	FloHockey.tv	Martinsson	W 6–3	1,600	13–12–1 (11–8–1–0)
January 24	7:07 PM	vs. #15 Northern Michigan		Carlson Center • Fairbanks, Alaska	FloHockey.tv	Martinsson	T 4–4 ^{3x3 OTL}	1,230	13–12–2 (11–8–2–0)
January 25	7:07 PM	vs. #15 Northern Michigan		Carlson Center • Fairbanks, Alaska	FloHockey.tv	Grigals	L 1–4	1,405	13–13–2 (11–9–2–0)
February 7	4:07 PM	at Alabama–Huntsville		Von Braun Center • Huntsville, Alabama	FloHockey.tv	Grigals	T 6–6 ^{3x3 OTW}	1,405	13–13–3 (11–9–3–1)
February 8	4:07 PM	at Alabama–Huntsville		Von Braun Center • Huntsville, Alabama	FloHockey.tv	Grigals	W 3–0	1,563	14–13–3 (12–9–3–1)
February 14	7:07 PM	vs. Bowling Green		Carlson Center • Fairbanks, Alaska	FloHockey.tv	Grigals	T 2–2 ^{3x3 OTW}	1,234	14–13–4 (12–9–4–2)
February 15	7:07 PM	vs. Bowling Green		Carlson Center • Fairbanks, Alaska	FloHockey.tv	Grigals	T 3–3 ^{SOL}	1,805	14–13–5 (12–9–5–2)
February 28	7:07 PM	vs. Alaska Anchorage		Carlson Center • Fairbanks, Alaska (Governor's Cup)	FloHockey.tv	Martinsson	W 5–2	1,998	15–13–5 (13–9–5–2)
February 29	7:07 PM	vs. Alaska Anchorage		Carlson Center • Fairbanks, Alaska (Governor's Cup)	FloHockey.tv	Martinsson	W 6–1	2,567	16–13–5 (14–9–5–2)
WCHA Tournament
March 6	7:07 PM	vs. Bowling Green*		Carlson Center • Fairbanks, Alaska (WCHA Quarterfinals game 1)		Martinsson	L 2–4	1,535	16–14–5 (14–9–5–2)
March 7	7:07 PM	vs. Bowling Green*		Carlson Center • Fairbanks, Alaska (WCHA Quarterfinals game 2)		Martinsson	L 2–3	1,682	16–15–5 (14–9–5–2)
Alaska Lost Series 0–2
*Non-conference game. ^{#}Rankings from USCHO.com Poll. All times are in Alaska Time.

== Scoring statistics ==
Name	Position	Games	Goals	Assists	Points	PIM
Steven Jandric	LW	35	13	20	33	47
Max Newton	F	36	9	18	27	43
Chris Jandric	D	35	5	17	22	40
Justin Young	C	36	9	12	21	26
Kylar Hope	F	27	10	10	20	57
Tyler Cline	C/LW	36	8	11	19	22
Colton Leiter	C/D	35	6	10	16	36
Tristan Thompson	D	35	5	9	14	16
James LaDouce	D	35	5	5	10	26
Roberts Kaļķis	D	35	2	7	9	18
Kyle Marino	F	35	1	8	9	76
Ēriks Žohovs	C	27	1	6	7	8
Didrick Henbrant	RW	36	2	4	6	16
Antti Virtanen	D	33	1	5	6	22
Caleb Hite	F	24	4	1	5	14
Filip Fornåå Svensson	C/RW	24	2	2	4	4
Markuss Komuls	D	35	2	2	4	10
Logan Coomes	LW	23	2	1	3	8
Troy Van Tetering	LW	27	1	2	3	4
Garrett Pyke	D/F	15	0	3	3	8
Colin Doyle	C	30	0	3	3	23
Jordan Muzzillo	D	8	0	2	2	4
Anton Martinsson	G	23	0	1	1	0
Brennan Blaszczak	F	9	0	0	0	17
Jack Weiss	D	13	0	0	0	6
Gustavs Grigals	G	16	0	0	0	0
Total						

== Goaltending statistics ==
Name	Games	Minutes	Wins	Losses	Ties	Goals against	Saves	Shut outs	SV %	GAA
Gustavs Grigals	16	845	7	5	3	33	319	2	.906	2.34
Anton Martinsson	23	1313	9	10	2	55	621	2	.919	2.51
Empty Net	-	26	-	-	-	5	-	-	-	-
Total	36	2185	16	15	5	93	940	4	.910	2.55

== Rankings ==
Poll	Week																							
Poll	Pre	1	2	3	4	5	6	7	8	9	10	11	12	13	14	15	16	17	18	19	20	21	22	23 (Final)
USCHO.com	NR	NR	NR	NR	NR	NR	NR	NR	NR	NR	NR	NR	NR	NR	NR	NR	NR	NR	NR	NR	NR	NR	NR	NR
USA Today	NR	NR	NR	NR	NR	NR	NR	NR	NR	NR	NR	NR	NR	NR	NR	NR	NR	NR	NR	NR	NR	NR	NR	NR
