= 2019–20 Alaska Anchorage Seawolves men's ice hockey season =

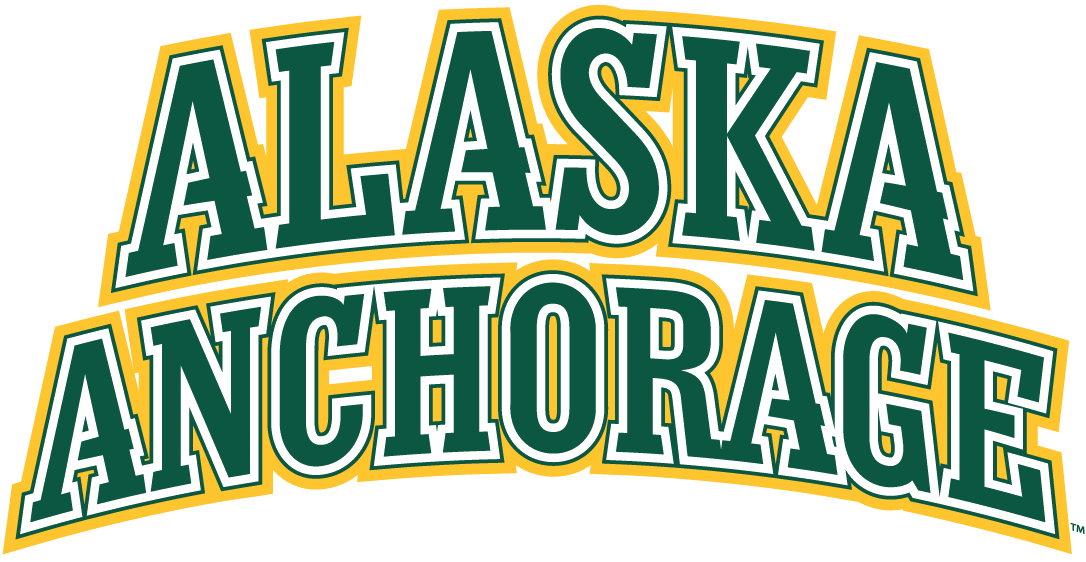
- Conference: 8th WCHA
- Home ice: Wells Fargo Sports Complex

Rankings
- USCHO: NR
- USA Today: NR

Record
- Overall: 4–25–7
- Conference: 4–20–6–3
- Home: 3–8–5
- Road: 1–17–2
- Neutral: 0–0–0

Coaches and captains
- Head coach: Matt Curley
- Assistant coaches: Mark Phalon; Matt Bruneteau; P. D. Melgoza
- Captain: Nolan Nicholas
- Alternate captain: Eric Sinclair

The 2019–20 Alaska Anchorage Seawolves men's ice hockey season was the 41st season of play for the program, the 36th at the Division I level and the 27th in the WCHA conference. The Seawolves represented the University of Alaska Anchorage and were coached by Matt Curley, in his 2nd season.

== Departures ==
Player	Position	Nationality	Cause
Cam Amantea	Forward	Canada	Graduation (Retired)
Brody Claeys	Goaltender	Canada	Signed Professional Contract (Birmingham Bulls)
Nicolas Erb Ekholm	Forward	Sweden	Graduation (Signed with Wheeling Nailers)
Malcolm Hayes	Defenseman	United States	Graduation (Signed with Fayetteville Marksmen)
Jeremiah Luedtke	Forward	United States	Graduation (Signed with Krefeld Pinguine)
Jonah Renouf	Forward	Canada	Graduation (Retired)
Nate Renouf	Forward	Canada	Graduation (Retired)
Nils Rygaard	Forward	Sweden	Graduation (Signed with Södertälje SK)
Jordan Xavier	Forward	Canada	Transferred to (Calgary)

== Recruiting ==
Player	Position	Nationality	Age	Notes
Luc Brown	Forward	Canada	23	Napanee, ON; transfer from Union
Brayden Camrud	Forward	Canada	21	Saskatoon, SK
Dante Fantauzzi	Defenseman	Canada	19	Woodbridge, ON
Alex Frye	Forward	United States	21	Clarkston, MI
Taylor Lantz	Forward	United States	21	Coleraine, MN
Marcus Mitchell	Forward	Canada	20	Kelowna, BC
Zack Nazzarett	Forward	United States	19	Cheektowaga, NY
Brandon Perrone	Goaltender	United States	20	Hauppauge, NY
Troy Robillard	Defenseman	Canada	20	Coquitlam, BC
Rylee St. Onge	Forward	Canada	21	St. Catharines, ON
Nick Wicks	Forward	Canada	21	Delta, BC

== Roster ==
As of August 18, 2019.

No.	Nat.	Player	Class	Pos	Height	Weight	DoB	Hometown	Previous team	NHL rights
1	(United States)	Brandon Perrone	Freshman	G	5' 11" (1.8 m)	175 lb (79 kg)	1998-10-26	Hauppauge, New York	New Jersey Titans (NAHL)	—
3	(United States)	Andrew Lane	Sophomore	D	5' 9" (1.75 m)	162 lb (73 kg)	1997-02-19	Howell, Michigan	Shreveport Mudbugs (NAHL)	—
4	(Canada)	Troy Robillard	Freshman	D	6' 3" (1.91 m)	205 lb (93 kg)	1998-10-12	Coquitlam, British Columbia	Coquitlam Express (BCHL)	—
6	(Canada)	Dante Fantauzzi	Freshman	D	6' 0" (1.83 m)	175 lb (79 kg)	2000-05-01	Woodbridge, Ontario	North York Rangers (OJHL)	—
7	(Canada)	Nolan Nicholas (C)	Senior	D	5' 11" (1.8 m)	203 lb (92 kg)	1995-09-24	Thunder Bay, Ontario	Sioux Falls Stampede (USHL)	—
8	(Canada)	Drayson Pears	Sophomore	D	6' 1" (1.85 m)	191 lb (87 kg)	1998-03-09	Shawnigan Lake, British Columbia	Victoria Grizzlies (BCHL)	—
9	(Canada)	Nick Wicks	Freshman	F	5' 9" (1.75 m)	170 lb (77 kg)	1998-04-24	Delta, British Columbia	Merritt Centennials (NAHL)	—
10	(United States)	Tanner Schachle	Sophomore	F	6' 3" (1.91 m)	203 lb (92 kg)	1997-06-20	Wasilla, Alaska	Fairbanks Ice Dogs (NAHL)	—
11	(United States)	Joe Sofo	Junior	F	5' 10" (1.78 m)	181 lb (82 kg)	1996-08-07	Sylvania, Ohio	Coulee Region Chill (NAHL)	—
12	(United States)	Zack Nazzarett	Freshman	F	5' 8" (1.73 m)	161 lb (73 kg)	2000-08-25	Cheektowaga, New York	Youngstown Phantoms (USHL)	—
13	(United States)	Alex Frye	Freshman	F	5' 11" (1.8 m)	175 lb (79 kg)	1998-07-27	Clarkston, Michigan	Jamestown Rebels (NAHL)	—
14	(Canada)	Jared Nash	Sophomore	F	5' 11" (1.8 m)	192 lb (87 kg)	1998-01-16	Stratford, Ontario	Penticton Vees (SJHL)	—
15	(United States)	Taylor Lantz	Freshman	F	5' 8" (1.73 m)	165 lb (75 kg)	1998-06-21	Coleraine, Minnesota	Minot Minotauros (NAHL)	—
16	(Canada)	Zach Court	Sophomore	F	5' 10" (1.78 m)	183 lb (83 kg)	1997-01-04	Winnipeg, Manitoba	Merritt Centennials (BCHL)	—
17	(Canada)	Zac Masson	Junior	F	6' 1" (1.85 m)	200 lb (91 kg)	1996-02-06	Newmarket, Ontario	Langley Rivermen (BCHL)	—
18	(Finland)	Tomi Hiekkavirta	Senior	D	6' 0" (1.83 m)	182 lb (83 kg)	1996-04-05	Helsinki, Finland	HIFK U20 (Nuorten SM-liiga)	—
19	(United States)	Drake Glover	Junior	F	6' 0" (1.83 m)	192 lb (87 kg)	1996-03-05	Anchorage, Alaska	Lone Star Brahmas (NAHL)	—
20	(Canada)	Corey Renwick	Senior	F	6' 0" (1.83 m)	192 lb (87 kg)	1995-03-28	Nanoose Bay, British Columbia	Nanaimo Clippers (BCHL)	—
22	(Canada)	Carmine Buono	Senior	D	6' 2" (1.88 m)	203 lb (92 kg)	1997-02-22	Burnaby, British Columbia	Powell River Kings (BCHL)	—
23	(Canada)	Eric Sinclair (A)	Junior	D	6' 0" (1.83 m)	175 lb (79 kg)	1996-02-19	Kenora, Ontario	Flin Flon Bombers (SJHL)	—
24	(Canada)	Luc Brown	Senior	F	6' 0" (1.83 m)	187 lb (85 kg)	1996-04-27	Napanee, Ontario	Union (ECAC)	—
25	(Canada)	Marcus Mitchell	Freshman	F	6' 2" (1.88 m)	200 lb (91 kg)	1998-10-12	Kelowna, British Columbia	Nanaimo Clippers (BCHL)	—
26	(United States)	Aaron McPheters	Junior	D	5' 8" (1.73 m)	165 lb (75 kg)	1997-03-25	Anchorage, Alaska	Fairbanks Ice Dogs (NAHL)	—
27	(Germany)	David Trinkberger	Senior	D	6' 5" (1.96 m)	209 lb (95 kg)	1996-08-25	Landshut, Germany	Sioux City Musketeers (USHL)	—
28	(Canada)	Rylee St. Onge	Freshman	F	5' 10" (1.78 m)	195 lb (88 kg)	1998-04-22	St. Catharines, Ontario	Des Moines Buccaneers (USHL)	—
29	(Canada)	Trey deGraaf	Junior	F	5' 11" (1.8 m)	180 lb (82 kg)	1996-01-30	Red Deer, Alberta	Okotoks Oilers (AJHL)	—
30	(United States)	Kris Carlson	Junior	G	6' 1" (1.85 m)	207 lb (94 kg)	1997-08-19	Centreville, Virginia	Jersey Hitmen (USPHL)	—
39	(Canada)	Kristian Stead	Junior	G	6' 2" (1.88 m)	182 lb (83 kg)	1996-10-17	Merritt, British Columbia	Nipawin Hawks (SJHL)	—
40	(Canada)	Brayden Camrud	Freshman	F	5' 9" (1.75 m)	180 lb (82 kg)	1998-07-24	Saskatoon, Saskatchewan	Humboldt Broncos (SJHL)	—

== Standings ==
2019–20 Western Collegiate Hockey Association Standings
	Conference record								Overall record					
	GP	W	L	T	3/SW	PTS	GF	GA	GP	W	L	T	GF	GA
#2 Minnesota State	28	23	4	1	1	71	115	38	36	29	5	2	141	53
#11 Bemidji State	28	20	5	3	2	65	101	46	34	20	9	5	111	65
Northern Michigan	28	16	11	1	1	50	92	87	36	18	14	4	115	112
Alaska	28	14	9	5	2	49	73	65	34	16	13	5	84	86
Bowling Green	28	14	10	4	3	49	85	70	36	19	13	4	112	92
Michigan Tech	28	14	12	2	0	44	68	65	37	19	15	3	96	85
Lake Superior State	28	11	13	4	4	41	66	77	38	13	21	4	90	112
Alaska Anchorage	28	4	18	6	3	21	56	96	34	4	23	7	66	122
Ferris State	28	5	21	2	0	17	54	100	35	7	26	2	70	127
Alabama–Huntsville	28	2	20	6	1	13	50	116	34	2	26	6	57	145
Championship: March 21, 2020 † indicates conference regular season champion; * indicates conference tournament champion Rankings: USCHO.com Top 20 Poll; updated March 1, 2020

== Schedule and results ==
Date	Time	Opponent^{#}	Rank^{#}	Site	TV	Decision	Result	Attendance	Record
Regular season
October 11	3:00 PM	at Maine*		Alfond Arena • Orono, Maine		Stead	L 1–7	2,975	0–1–0
October 12	3:00 PM	at Maine*		Alfond Arena • Orono, Maine		Carlson	L 1–2 ^{OT}	2,916	0–2–0
October 25	7:07 PM	vs. Alaska		Wells Fargo Sports Complex • Anchorage, Alaska (Governor's Cup)	FloHockey.tv	Carlson	L 1–2	616	0–3–0 (0–1–0–0)
October 26	5:07 PM	vs. Alaska		Wells Fargo Sports Complex • Anchorage, Alaska (Governor's Cup)	FloHockey.tv	Stead	W 4–0	581	1–3–0 (1–1–0–0)
October 31	7:07 PM	vs. Omaha*		Wells Fargo Sports Complex • Anchorage, Alaska		Stead	L 3–4	723	1–4–0 (1–1–0–0)
November 1	7:07 PM	vs. Omaha*		Wells Fargo Sports Complex • Anchorage, Alaska		Carlson	T 3–3 ^{OT}	766	1–4–1 (1–1–0–0)
November 8	4:07 PM	at Alabama–Huntsville		Von Braun Center • Huntsville, Alabama	FloHockey.tv	Stead	T 4–4 ^{SOW}	1,217	1–4–2 (1–1–1–1)
November 9	4:07 PM	at Alabama–Huntsville		Von Braun Center • Huntsville, Alabama	FloHockey.tv	Stead	W 3–1	1,187	2–4–2 (2–1–1–1)
November 15	3:07 PM	vs. #17 Bowling Green		Wells Fargo Sports Complex • Anchorage, Alaska	FloHockey.tv	Stead	L 1–3	725	2–5–2 (2–2–1–1)
November 16	1:07 PM	vs. #17 Bowling Green		Wells Fargo Sports Complex • Anchorage, Alaska	FloHockey.tv	Carlson	L 0–3	712	2–6–2 (2–3–1–1)
November 22	4:07 PM	at #1 Minnesota State		Mankato Civic Center • Mankato, Minnesota	FloHockey.tv	Stead	L 1–7	4,037	2–7–2 (2–4–1–1)
November 23	3:07 PM	at #1 Minnesota State		Mankato Civic Center • Mankato, Minnesota	FloHockey.tv	Carlson	L 0–3	4,522	2–8–2 (2–5–1–1)
November 29	7:07 PM	vs. Ferris State		Wells Fargo Sports Complex • Anchorage, Alaska	FloHockey.tv	Stead	L 1–4	712	2–9–2 (2–6–1–1)
November 30	5:07 PM	vs. Ferris State		Wells Fargo Sports Complex • Anchorage, Alaska	FloHockey.tv	Carlson	T 4–4 ^{SOW}	712	2–9–3 (2–6–2–2)
December 6	3:07 PM	at Michigan Tech		MacInnes Student Ice Arena • Houghton, Michigan	FloHockey.tv	Carlson	L 1–2	2,689	2–10–3 (2–7–2–2)
December 7	2:07 PM	at Michigan Tech		MacInnes Student Ice Arena • Houghton, Michigan	FloHockey.tv	Carlson	L 1–4	2,838	2–11–3 (2–8–2–2)
January 4	5:07 PM	vs. Lake Superior State		Wells Fargo Sports Complex • Anchorage, Alaska	FloHockey.tv	Carlson	W 2–0	725	3–11–3 (3–8–2–2)
January 5	3:07 PM	vs. Lake Superior State		Wells Fargo Sports Complex • Anchorage, Alaska	FloHockey.tv	Carlson	L 3–5	650	3–12–3 (3–9–2–2)
January 10	3:07 PM	at #19 Northern Michigan		Berry Events Center • Marquette, Michigan	FloHockey.tv	Carlson	L 1–4	2,477	3–13–3 (3–10–2–2)
January 11	2:07 PM	at #19 Northern Michigan		Berry Events Center • Marquette, Michigan	FloHockey.tv	Stead	L 3–6	3,066	3–14–3 (3–11–2–2)
January 17	7:07 PM	vs. Alabama–Huntsville		Wells Fargo Sports Complex • Anchorage, Alaska	FloHockey.tv	Carlson	W 5–1	650	4–14–3 (4–11–2–2)
January 18	5:07 PM	vs. Alabama–Huntsville		Wells Fargo Sports Complex • Anchorage, Alaska	FloHockey.tv	Carlson	T 2–2 ^{3x3 OTL}	666	4–14–4 (4–11–3–3)
January 24	3:07 PM	at Lake Superior State		Taffy Abel Arena • Sault Ste. Marie, Michigan	FloHockey.tv	Carlson	L 2–3	1,870	4–15–4 (4–12–3–3)
January 25	3:07 PM	at Lake Superior State		Taffy Abel Arena • Sault Ste. Marie, Michigan	FloHockey.tv	Perrone	T 3–3 ^{3x3 OTL}	2,216	4–15–5 (4–12–4–3)
January 31	7:07 PM	vs. #3 Minnesota State		Wells Fargo Sports Complex • Anchorage, Alaska	FloHockey.tv	Stead	L 1–7	666	4–16–5 (4–13–4–3)
February 1	5:07 PM	vs. Minnesota State		Wells Fargo Sports Complex • Anchorage, Alaska	FloHockey.tv	Carlson	T 2–2 ^{3x3 OTL}	690	4–16–6 (4–13–5–3)
February 7	3:07 PM	at Bowling Green		Slater Family Ice Arena • Bowling Green, Ohio	FloHockey.tv	Carlson	L 4–5 ^{OT}	2,450	4–17–6 (4–14–5–3)
February 8	3:07 PM	at Bowling Green		Slater Family Ice Arena • Bowling Green, Ohio	FloHockey.tv	Carlson	L 1–4	3,515	4–18–6 (4–15–5–3)
February 14	5:05 PM	at #10 Arizona State*		Oceanside Ice Arena • Tempe, Arizona		Carlson	L 0–5	897	4–19–6 (4–15–5–3)
February 15	5:05 PM	at #10 Arizona State*		Oceanside Ice Arena • Tempe, Arizona		Carlson	L 2–5	936	4–20–6 (4–15–5–3)
February 21	7:07 PM	vs. #13 Bemidji State		Wells Fargo Sports Complex • Anchorage, Alaska	FloHockey.tv	Carlson	L 1–4	666	4–21–6 (4–16–5–3)
February 22	5:07 PM	vs. #13 Bemidji State		Wells Fargo Sports Complex • Anchorage, Alaska	FloHockey.tv	Perrone	T 2–2 ^{3x3 OTL}	666	4–21–7 (4–16–6–3)
February 28	7:07 PM	at Alaska		Carlson Center • Fairbanks, Alaska (Governor's Cup)	FloHockey.tv	Perrone	L 2–5	1,998	4–22–7 (4–17–6–3)
February 29	7:07 PM	at Alaska		Carlson Center • Fairbanks, Alaska (Governor's Cup)	FloHockey.tv	Perrone	L 1–6	2,567	4–23–7 (4–18–6–3)
WCHA Tournament
March 6	4:07 PM	at #3 Minnesota State*		Mayo Clinic Health System Event Center • Mankato, Minnesota (WCHA Quarterfinals game 1)		Carlson	L 1–8	3,090	4–24–7 (4–18–6–3)
March 7	3:07 PM	at #3 Minnesota State*		Mayo Clinic Health System Event Center • Mankato, Minnesota (WCHA Quarterfinals game 2)		Carlson	L 2–4	3,417	4–25–7 (4–18–6–3)
Alaska Anchorage Lost Series 0–2
*Non-conference game. ^{#}Rankings from USCHO.com Poll. All times are in Alaska Time.

== Scoring statistics ==
Name	Position	Games	Goals	Assists	Points	PIM
Luc Brown	RW	20	8	12	20	12
Rylee St. Onge	LW	36	8	9	17	22
Nick Wicks	F	35	7	9	16	6
Tomi Hiekkavirta	D	33	2	13	15	10
Alex Frye	C	34	9	5	14	28
Tanner Schachle	LW	32	7	7	14	54
Zack Nazzarett	LW	19	7	4	11	27
Taylor Lantz	C	31	2	8	10	26
Jared Nash	C	33	2	8	10	38
Trey deGraaf	F	36	5	4	9	10
Brayden Camrud	C	21	3	5	8	62
Eric Sinclair	D	36	2	6	8	54
Zach Court	LW	23	1	5	6	10
Zac Masson	RW	34	1	4	5	18
Marcus Mitchell	RW	30	2	2	4	39
Drayson Pears	D	28	0	4	4	6
Corey Renwick	F	24	2	1	3	4
Carmine Buono	D	30	0	3	3	15
Drake Glover	C	10	1	1	2	0
Troy Robillard	D	24	0	2	2	18
Nolan Nicholas	D	36	0	2	2	12
David Trinkberger	D	21	0	1	1	21
Aaron McPheters	D	30	0	1	1	29
Andrew Lane	D	3	0	0	0	0
Brandon Perrone	G	8	0	0	0	0
Kristian Stead	G	10	0	0	0	0
Dante Fantauzzi	D	11	0	0	0	0
Joe Sofo	F	14	0	0	0	23
Kris Carlson	G	24	0	0	0	0
Bench	-	-	-	-	-	8
Total			69	116	185	552

== Goaltending statistics ==
Name	Games	Minutes	Wins	Losses	Ties	Goals against	Saves	Shut outs	SV %	GAA
Kris Carlson	24	1255	2	16	3	66	640	1	.907	3.15
Brandon Perrone	8	393	0	2	3	24	164	0	.872	3.66
Kristian Stead	10	534	2	7	1	42	254	1	.858	4.71
Empty Net	-	17	-	-	-	2	-	-	-	-
Total	36	2200	4	25	7	134	1058	2	.888	3.65

== Rankings ==
Poll	Week																							
Poll	Pre	1	2	3	4	5	6	7	8	9	10	11	12	13	14	15	16	17	18	19	20	21	22	23 (Final)
USCHO.com	NR	NR	NR	NR	NR	NR	NR	NR	NR	NR	NR	NR	NR	NR	NR	NR	NR	NR	NR	NR	NR	NR	NR	NR
USA Today	NR	NR	NR	NR	NR	NR	NR	NR	NR	NR	NR	NR	NR	NR	NR	NR	NR	NR	NR	NR	NR	NR	NR	NR
