= 2019–20 Northern Michigan Wildcats men's ice hockey season =

Sports season

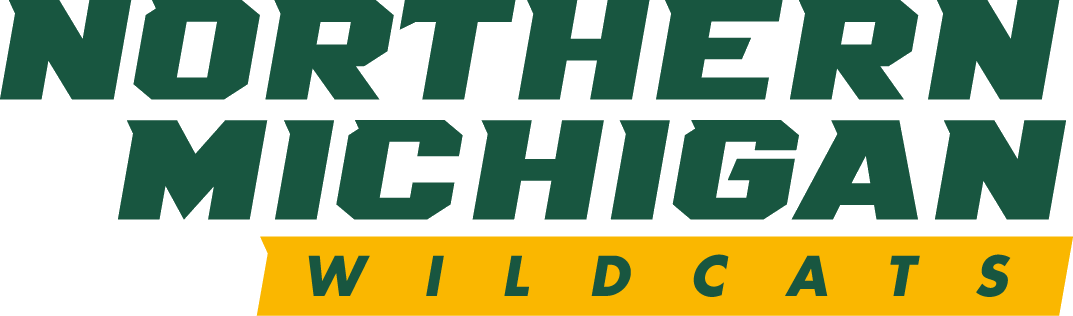
- Conference: 3rd WCHA
- Home ice: Berry Events Center

Rankings
- USCHO.com: NR
- USA Today/ US Hockey Magazine: NR

Record
- Overall: 18–16–4
- Conference: 16–11–1–1
- Home: 9–10–1
- Road: 9–6–3
- Neutral: 0–0–0

Coaches and captains
- Head coach: Grant Potulny
- Assistant coaches: Byron Pool; Rob Lehtinen
- Captain: Philip Beaulieu
- Alternate captain: Joe Nardi

The 2019–20 Northern Michigan Wildcats men's ice hockey season was the 44th season of play for the program and the 20th in the WCHA conference. The Wildcats represented Northern Michigan University and were coached by Grant Potulny, in his 3rd season.

== Roster ==
As of September 9, 2019.

| No. | Nat. | Player | Class | Pos | Height | Weight | DoB | Hometown | Previous team | NHL rights |
|---|---|---|---|---|---|---|---|---|---|---|
| 4 | (Canada) | Michael Van Unen | Freshman | D | 6' 1" (1.85 m) | 190 lb (86 kg) | 1999-02-26 | Kamloops, British Columbia | Merritt Centennials (BCHL) | — |
| 5 | (United States) | Mason Palmer | Freshman | D | 6' 2" (1.88 m) | 190 lb (86 kg) | 1998-11-20 | Plymouth, Minnesota | Waterloo Black Hawks (USHL) | — |
| 6 | (Canada) | Rylan Yaremko | Senior | D | 6' 3" (1.91 m) | 224 lb (102 kg) | 1996-09-15 | Spirit River, Alberta | West Kelowna Warriors (BCHL) | — |
| 9 | (Canada) | Darien Craighead | Senior | F | 6' 1" (1.85 m) | 190 lb (86 kg) | 1997-03-07 | Surrey, British Columbia | Chilliwack Chiefs (BCHL) | — |
| 10 | (United States) | Ben Newhouse | Junior (RS) | D | 5' 8" (1.73 m) | 174 lb (79 kg) | 1997-06-16 | Edina, Minnesota | Union (ECAC) | — |
| 11 | (United States) | Andre Ghantous | Freshman | F | 5' 9" (1.75 m) | 170 lb (77 kg) | 1998-12-07 | Glendale, California | Penticton Vees (BCHL) | — |
| 13 | (United States) | Luke Voltin | Senior | F | 6' 0" (1.83 m) | 204 lb (93 kg) | 1995-04-13 | Blaine, Minnesota | Penticton Vees (BCHL) | — |
| 14 | (United States) | Vincent de Mey | Sophomore | F | 6' 1" (1.85 m) | 185 lb (84 kg) | 1997-11-26 | Los Angeles, California | Muskegon Lumberjacks (USHL) | — |
| 15 | (United States) | Caleb Schroer | Junior | F | 5' 9" (1.75 m) | 168 lb (76 kg) | 1996-05-07 | Wisconsin Rapids, Wisconsin | Coulee Region Chill (NAHL) | — |
| 16 | (United States) | Griffin Loughran | Sophomore | F | 5' 7" (1.7 m) | 145 lb (66 kg) | 1998-11-13 | West Seneca, New York | Fargo Force (USHL) | — |
| 17 | (Canada) | Josh Arnold | Freshman | F | 5' 9" (1.75 m) | 180 lb (82 kg) | 1999-08-13 | Penticton, British Columbia | Wenatchee Wild (BCHL) | — |
| 18 | (Canada) | Joseph Nardi (A) | Junior | F | 5' 10" (1.78 m) | 178 lb (81 kg) | 1997-06-01 | Edmonton, Alberta | Whitecourt Wolverines (AJHL) | — |
| 19 | (United States) | A. J. Vanderbeck | Freshman (RS) | F | 6' 0" (1.83 m) | 180 lb (82 kg) | 1997-09-23 | Monument, Colorado | Ohio State (Big Ten) | — |
| 20 | (United States) | Garrett Klee | Sophomore | F | 6' 1" (1.85 m) | 190 lb (86 kg) | 1998-04-11 | Morrison, Colorado | Waterloo Black Hawks (USHL) | — |
| 22 | (United States) | Jett Jungels | Freshman | F | 5' 8" (1.73 m) | 165 lb (75 kg) | 2000-07-14 | Edina, Minnesota | Edina High School (USHS–MN) | — |
| 23 | (United States) | Mitchel Slattery | Junior | F | 5' 11" (1.8 m) | 184 lb (83 kg) | 1996-04-20 | Lino Lakes, Minnesota | Minnesota Magicians (NAHL) | — |
| 24 | (United States) | Hank Sorensen | Freshman | D | 6' 1" (1.85 m) | 195 lb (88 kg) | 1998-06-05 | Wayzata, Minnesota | Waterloo Black Hawks (USHL) | — |
| 25 | (United States) | Philip Beaulieu (C) | Senior | D | 5' 11" (1.8 m) | 187 lb (85 kg) | 1995-09-02 | Duluth, Minnesota | Madison Capitols (USHL) | — |
| 26 | (Canada) | Ty Readman | Sophomore | F | 5' 6" (1.68 m) | 160 lb (73 kg) | 1998-01-05 | Edmonton, Alberta | Sherwood Park Crusaders (AJHL) | — |
| 27 | (United States) | Adam Roeder | Junior | D | 5' 11" (1.8 m) | 188 lb (85 kg) | 1996-06-11 | Ballwin, Missouri | Janesville Jets (NAHL) | — |
| 28 | (United States) | Tanner Vescio | Freshman | D | 6' 2" (1.88 m) | 195 lb (88 kg) | 1998-04-14 | Blaine, Minnesota | Fargo Force (USHL) | — |
| 29 | (United States) | Grant Loven | Sophomore | F | 5' 11" (1.8 m) | 192 lb (87 kg) | 1997-12-21 | East Grand Forks, Minnesota | Minot Minotauros (NAHL) | — |
| 30 | (Canada) | John Hawthorne | Freshman | G | 6' 2" (1.88 m) | 185 lb (84 kg) | 1998-09-02 | Chemainus, British Columbia | Alberni Valley Bulldogs (BCHL) | — |
| 31 | (United States) | John Roberts | Freshman | G | 5' 9" (1.75 m) | 175 lb (79 kg) | 1998-12-02 | Lansdale, Pennsylvania | Bismarck Bobcats (NAHL) | — |
| 32 | (Canada) | Connor Ryckman | Junior (RS) | G | 6' 0" (1.83 m) | 170 lb (77 kg) | 1996-09-18 | Minesing, Ontario | Wisconsin–Stevens Point (WIAC) | — |
| 34 | (Canada) | Nolan Kent | Sophomore | G | 6' 0" (1.83 m) | 196 lb (89 kg) | 1998-08-12 | Chestermere, Alberta | Spruce Grove Saints (AJHL) | — |

== Standings ==
2019–20 Western Collegiate Hockey Association Standings
| | Conference record | | | | | | | | Overall record | | | | | |
| | GP | W | L | T | 3/SW | PTS | GF | GA | GP | W | L | T | GF | GA |
|---|---|---|---|---|---|---|---|---|---|---|---|---|---|---|
| #2 Minnesota State | 28 | 23 | 4 | 1 | 1 | 71 | 115 | 38 | 36 | 29 | 5 | 2 | 141 | 53 |
| #11 Bemidji State | 28 | 20 | 5 | 3 | 2 | 65 | 101 | 46 | 34 | 20 | 9 | 5 | 111 | 65 |
| Northern Michigan | 28 | 16 | 11 | 1 | 1 | 50 | 92 | 87 | 36 | 18 | 14 | 4 | 115 | 112 |
| Alaska | 28 | 14 | 9 | 5 | 2 | 49 | 73 | 65 | 34 | 16 | 13 | 5 | 84 | 86 |
| Bowling Green | 28 | 14 | 10 | 4 | 3 | 49 | 85 | 70 | 36 | 19 | 13 | 4 | 112 | 92 |
| Michigan Tech | 28 | 14 | 12 | 2 | 0 | 44 | 68 | 65 | 37 | 19 | 15 | 3 | 96 | 85 |
| Lake Superior State | 28 | 11 | 13 | 4 | 4 | 41 | 66 | 77 | 38 | 13 | 21 | 4 | 90 | 112 |
| Alaska Anchorage | 28 | 4 | 18 | 6 | 3 | 21 | 56 | 96 | 34 | 4 | 23 | 7 | 66 | 122 |
| Ferris State | 28 | 5 | 21 | 2 | 0 | 17 | 54 | 100 | 35 | 7 | 26 | 2 | 70 | 127 |
| Alabama–Huntsville | 28 | 2 | 20 | 6 | 1 | 13 | 50 | 116 | 34 | 2 | 26 | 6 | 57 | 145 |
Championship: March 21, 2020 † indicates conference regular season champion; * indicates conference tournament champion Rankings: USCHO.com Top 20 Poll; updated March 1, 2020

== Schedule and results ==
| Date | Time | Opponent^{#} | Rank^{#} | Site | TV | Decision | Result | Attendance | Record |
Exhibition
| October 5 | 7:00 PM | at USNTDP* | | USA Hockey Arena • Plymouth, Michigan (Exhibition) | | Hawthorne | W 4–3 | 847 | |
Regular season
| October 11 | 7:00 PM | vs. Michigan State* | | Berry Events Center • Marquette, Michigan | | Kent | L 5–3 | 4,043 | 0–1–0 |
| October 12 | 6:07 PM | vs. Michigan State* | | Berry Events Center • Marquette, Michigan | | Hawthorne | W 2–0 | 4,071 | 1–1–0 |
| October 18 | 6:07 PM | at #20 Boston University* | | Agganis Arena • Boston, Massachusetts | | Hawthorne | T 4–4 ^{OT} | 3,277 | 1–1–1 |
| October 19 | 7:05 PM | at #20 Boston University* | | Agganis Arena • Boston, Massachusetts | | Kent | W 4–3 | 3,083 | 2–1–1 |
| October 25 | 7:07 PM | at Ferris State | | Ewigleben Arena • Big Rapids, Michigan | FloHockey.tv | Hawthorne | W 4–3 | 1,832 | 3–1–1 (1–0–0–0) |
| October 26 | 6:07 PM | at Ferris State | | Ewigleben Arena • Big Rapids, Michigan | FloHockey.tv | Kent | W 6–4 | 2,500 | 4–1–1 (2–0–0–0) |
| November 1 | 7:07 PM | vs. Alabama–Huntsville | #20 | Berry Events Center • Marquette, Michigan | FloHockey.tv | Hawthorne | W 5–3 | 2,493 | 5–1–1 (3–0–0–0) |
| November 2 | 6:07 PM | vs. Alabama–Huntsville | #20 | Berry Events Center • Marquette, Michigan | FloHockey.tv | Kent | W 4–2 | 2,959 | 6–1–1 (4–0–0–0) |
| November 8 | 7:07 PM | vs. St. Cloud State* | #16 | Berry Events Center • Marquette, Michigan | | Hawthorne | T 3–3 ^{OT} | 3,020 | 6–1–2 (4–0–0–0) |
| November 9 | 6:00 PM | vs. St. Cloud State* | #16 | Berry Events Center • Marquette, Michigan | | Hawthorne | L 4–5 ^{OT} | 3,258 | 6–2–2 (4–0–0–0) |
| November 15 | 7:07 PM | vs. Alaska | #18 | Berry Events Center • Marquette, Michigan | FloHockey.tv | Hawthorne | W 2–1 | 2,605 | 7–2–2 (5–0–0–0) |
| November 16 | 6:07 PM | vs. Alaska | #18 | Berry Events Center • Marquette, Michigan | FloHockey.tv | Hawthorne | L 2–3 | 2,785 | 7–3–2 (5–1–0–0) |
| November 22 | 7:07 PM | at Michigan Tech | #19 | MacInnes Student Ice Arena • Houghton, Michigan | FloHockey.tv | Kent | L 2–3 | 3,337 | 7–4–2 (5–2–0–0) |
| November 23 | 6:07 PM | vs. Michigan Tech | #19 | Berry Events Center • Marquette, Michigan | FloHockey.tv | Kent | L 2–3 | 3,945 | 7–5–2 (5–3–0–0) |
| November 29 | 8:07 PM | at Alabama–Huntsville | | Von Braun Center • Huntsville, Alabama | FloHockey.tv | Kent | L 2–4 | 1,142 | 7–6–2 (5–4–0–0) |
| November 30 | 8:07 PM | at Alabama–Huntsville | | Von Braun Center • Huntsville, Alabama | FloHockey.tv | Kent | W 3–1 | 956 | 8–6–2 (6–4–0–0) |
| December 13 | 7:07 PM | vs. #1 Minnesota State | | Berry Events Center • Marquette, Michigan | FloHockey.tv | Hawthorne | L 2–5 | 2,227 | 8–7–2 (6–5–0–0) |
| December 14 | 6:00 PM | vs. #1 Minnesota State | | Berry Events Center • Marquette, Michigan | FloHockey.tv | Kent | W 4–1 | 2,246 | 9–7–2 (7–5–0–0) |
| January 3 | 6:07 PM | at #11 Bowling Green | | Slater Family Ice Arena • Bowling Green, Ohio | FloHockey.tv | Kent | W 5–2 | 1,912 | 10–7–2 (8–5–0–0) |
| January 4 | 7:07 PM | at #11 Bowling Green | | Slater Family Ice Arena • Bowling Green, Ohio | FloHockey.tv | Kent | W 4–3 ^{OT} | 2,113 | 11–7–2 (9–5–0–0) |
| January 10 | 7:07 PM | vs. Alaska Anchorage | #19 | Berry Events Center • Marquette, Michigan | FloHockey.tv | Kent | W 4–1 | 2,477 | 12–7–2 (10–5–0–0) |
| January 11 | 6:07 PM | vs. Alaska Anchorage | #19 | Berry Events Center • Marquette, Michigan | FloHockey.tv | Kent | W 6–3 | 3,066 | 13–7–2 (11–5–0–0) |
| January 17 | 7:00 PM | at #1 Cornell* | #17 | Lynah Rink • Ithaca, New York | ESPN+ | Kent | T 2–2 ^{OT} | 3,511 | 13–7–3 (11–5–0–0) |
| January 18 | 7:00 PM | at #1 Cornell* | #17 | Lynah Rink • Ithaca, New York | ESPN+ | Kent | L 3–1 | 3,876 | 13–8–3 (11–5–0–0) |
| January 24 | 11:07 PM | at Alaska | #15 | Carlson Center • Fairbanks, Alaska | FloHockey.tv | Hawthorne | T 5–4 ^{3x3 OTW} | 1,230 | 13–8–4 (11–5–1–1) |
| January 25 | 11:07 PM | at Alaska | #15 | Carlson Center • Fairbanks, Alaska | FloHockey.tv | Hawthorne | W 4–2 | 1,405 | 14–8–4 (12–5–1–1) |
| January 31 | 7:07 PM | vs. Ferris State | #15 | Berry Events Center • Marquette, Michigan | FloHockey.tv | Kent | W 5–2 | 2,890 | 15–8–4 (13–5–1–1) |
| February 1 | 6:07 PM | vs. Ferris State | #15 | Berry Events Center • Marquette, Michigan | FloHockey.tv | Kent | W 5–2 | 3,738 | 16–8–4 (14–5–1–1) |
| February 7 | 8:07 PM | at #3 Minnesota State | #15 | Mankato Civic Center • Mankato, Minnesota | FloHockey.tv | Kent | L 7–3 | 4,436 | 16–9–4 (14–6–1–1) |
| February 8 | 8:07 PM | at #3 Minnesota State | #15 | Mankato Civic Center • Mankato, Minnesota | FloHockey.tv | Kent | L 1–0 | 5,090 | 16–10–4 (14–7–1–1) |
| February 14 | 7:07 PM | vs. #16 Bemidji State | #19 | Berry Events Center • Marquette, Michigan | FloHockey.tv | Kent | L 0–5 | 5,090 | 16–11–4 (14–8–1–1) |
| February 15 | 6:07 PM | vs. #16 Bemidji State | #19 | Berry Events Center • Marquette, Michigan | FloHockey.tv | Kent | L 1–5 | 3,383 | 16–12–4 (14–9–1–1) |
| February 21 | 7:07 PM | at Lake Superior State | | Taffy Abel Arena • Sault Ste. Marie, Michigan | FloHockey.tv | Kent | L 6–1 | 2,135 | 16–13–4 (14–10–1–1) |
| February 22 | 7:07 PM | at Lake Superior State | | Taffy Abel Arena • Sault Ste. Marie, Michigan | FloHockey.tv | Kent | W 5–1 | 2,904 | 17–13–4 (15–10–1–1) |
| February 28 | 7:07 PM | vs. Michigan Tech | | Berry Events Center • Marquette, Michigan | FloHockey.tv | Kent | L 4–8 | 4,030 | 17–14–4 (15–11–1–1) |
| February 29 | 6:07 PM | at Michigan Tech | | MacInnes Student Ice Arena • Houghton, Michigan | FloHockey.tv | Kent | W 3–2 | 4,053 | 18–14–4 (16–11–1–1) |
WCHA Tournament
| March 6 | 7:07 PM | vs. Northern Michigan* | | Berry Events Center • Marquette, Michigan (WCHA Quarterfinals Game 1) | | Kent | L 1–4 | 3,209 | 18–15–4 (16–11–1–1) |
| March 7 | 6:07 PM | vs. Northern Michigan* | | Berry Events Center • Marquette, Michigan (WCHA Quarterfinals Game 2) | | Kent | L 3–4 ^{3OT} | 3,765 | 18–16–4 (16–11–1–1) |
Northern Michigan Lost Series 0–2
*Non-conference game. ^{#}Rankings from USCHO.com Poll. All times are in Eastern Time.

== Scoring Statistics ==
| Name | Position | Games | Goals | Assists | Points | PIM |
|---|---|---|---|---|---|---|
| Griffin Loughran | F | 37 | 23 | 16 | 39 | 93 |
| Darien Craighead | RW | 36 | 15 | 16 | 31 | 33 |
| Vincent de Mey | F | 38 | 15 | 13 | 28 | 14 |
| Joseph Nardi | LW | 38 | 8 | 19 | 27 | 12 |
| Philip Beaulieu | D | 38 | 6 | 19 | 25 | 32 |
| André Ghantous | RW | 36 | 11 | 11 | 22 | 16 |
| Ty Readman | C | 38 | 4 | 15 | 19 | 8 |
| Ben Newhouse | D | 38 | 3 | 12 | 15 | 4 |
| Grant Loven | C | 38 | 3 | 11 | 14 | 20 |
| Luke Voltin | LW | 36 | 8 | 5 | 13 | 27 |
| Hank Sorensen | D | 37 | 4 | 9 | 13 | 101 |
| Brandon Schultz | C/LW | 18 | 1 | 10 | 11 | 8 |
| A. J. Vanderbeck | F | 8 | 2 | 7 | 9 | 2 |
| Mitchell Slattery | RW | 36 | 4 | 4 | 8 | 10 |
| Garrett Klee | F | 37 | 4 | 4 | 8 | 35 |
| Caleb Schroer | F | 25 | 3 | 5 | 8 | 4 |
| Adam Roeder | D | 36 | 3 | 5 | 8 | 12 |
| Michael Van Unen | D | 36 | 1 | 7 | 8 | 41 |
| Rylan Yaremko | D/RW | 36 | 1 | 3 | 4 | 26 |
| Nolan Kent | G | 30 | 0 | 3 | 3 | 0 |
| Tanner Vescio | D | 25 | 0 | 2 | 2 | 6 |
| Jarrett Lee | F | 17 | 0 | 1 | 1 | 15 |
| Mason Palmer | D | 28 | 0 | 1 | 1 | 14 |
| Jett Jungels | F | 1 | 0 | 0 | 0 | 0 |
| John Roberts | G | 1 | 0 | 0 | 0 | 0 |
| John Hawthorne | G | 17 | 0 | 0 | 0 | 0 |
| Bench | - | - | - | - | - | 12 |
| Total | | | 119 | 198 | 317 | 545 |

== Goaltending statistics ==
| Name | Games | Minutes | Wins | Losses | Ties | Goals against | Saves | Shut outs | SV % | GAA |
|---|---|---|---|---|---|---|---|---|---|---|
| John Roberts | 1 | 8 | 0 | 0 | 0 | 0 | 1 | 0 | 1.000 | 0.00 |
| Nolan Kent | 30 | 1530 | 13 | 11 | 1 | 73 | 668 | 0 | .901 | 2.86 |
| John Hawthorne | 17 | 793 | 5 | 5 | 3 | 41 | 306 | 1 | .882 | 3.10 |
| Empty Net | - | 20 | - | - | - | 6 | - | - | - | - |
| Total | 38 | 2352 | 18 | 16 | 4 | 120 | 975 | 1 | .890 | 3.06 |

== Rankings ==
| Poll | Week | | | | | | | | | | | | | | | | | | | | | | | |
| Poll | Pre | 1 | 2 | 3 | 4 | 5 | 6 | 7 | 8 | 9 | 10 | 11 | 12 | 13 | 14 | 15 | 16 | 17 | 18 | 19 | 20 | 21 | 22 | 23 (Final) |
|---|---|---|---|---|---|---|---|---|---|---|---|---|---|---|---|---|---|---|---|---|---|---|---|---|
| USCHO.com | NR | NR | NR | NR | 20 | 16 | 18 | 19 | NR | NR | NR | NR | NR | 19 | 17 | 15 | 15 | 15 | 19 | NR | NR | NR | NR | NR |
| USA Today | NR | NR | NR | NR | NR | NR | NR | NR | NR | NR | NR | NR | NR | NR | NR | 15 | 15 | NR | NR | NR | NR | NR | NR | NR |
