= 2019–20 Minnesota State Mavericks men's ice hockey season =

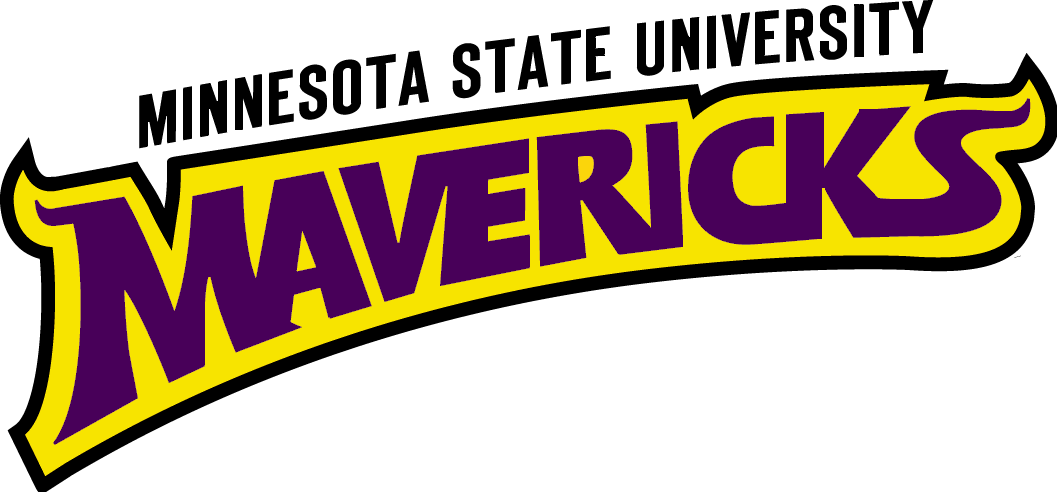

WCHA, Champion
- Conference: 1st WCHA
- Home ice: Mankato Civic Center

Rankings
- USCHO.com: 3
- USA Today/ US Hockey Magazine: 3

Record
- Overall: 31–5–2
- Conference: 23–4–1–1
- Home: 17–2–1
- Road: 13–2–1
- Neutral: 1–1–0

Coaches and captains
- Head coach: Mike Hastings
- Assistant coaches: Todd Knott; Darren Blue; Brennan Poderzay
- Captain(s): Marc Michaelis; Nicholas Rivera

The 2019–20 Minnesota State Mavericks men's ice hockey season was the 51st season of play for the program, the 24th at the Division I level and the 21st in the WCHA conference. The Mavericks represented Minnesota State University, Mankato and were coached by Mike Hastings, in his 8th season.

The team's season ended abruptly when the WCHA announced that the remainder of the tournament was cancelled due to the COVID-19 pandemic in the United States on March 12, 2020.

== Roster ==
As of July 12, 2019.

No.	Nat.	Player	Class	Pos	Height	Weight	DoB	Hometown	Previous team	NHL rights
1	(United States)	Jaxson Stauber	Freshman	G	6' 3" (1.91 m)	171 lb (78 kg)	1999-04-27	Plymouth, Minnesota	Sioux Falls Stampede (USHL)	—
1	(United States)	Evan Foss	Freshman	G	5' 11" (1.8 m)	170 lb (77 kg)	2001-02-17	White Bear Lake, Minnesota	White Bear Lake High School (USHS–MN)	—
2	(United States)	Connor Mackey	Junior	D	6' 2" (1.88 m)	191 lb (87 kg)	1996-09-12	Tower Lakes, Illinois	Green Bay Gamblers (USHL)	—
3	(United States)	Jack McNeely	Junior	D	6' 3" (1.91 m)	185 lb (84 kg)	1996-12-16	Lakeville, Minnesota	Muskegon Lumberjacks (USHL)	—
4	(United States)	Andy Carroll	Sophomore	D	5' 10" (1.78 m)	180 lb (82 kg)	1997-02-17	Northfield, Minnesota	Green Bay Gamblers (USHL)	—
5	(United States)	Jake Jaremko	Junior	F	6' 0" (1.83 m)	181 lb (82 kg)	1996-08-24	Nowthen, Minnesota	Chicago Steel (USHL)	—
6	(Germany)	Parker Tuomie	Senior	F	5' 10" (1.78 m)	185 lb (84 kg)	1995-10-31	Bremerhaven, Germany	Sioux Falls Stampede (USHL)	—
7	(United States)	Wyatt Aamodt	Sophomore	D	5' 11" (1.8 m)	201 lb (91 kg)	1997-11-22	Hermantown, Minnesota	Lincoln Stars (USHL)	—
8	(United States)	Nathan Smith	Freshman	F	6' 0" (1.83 m)	184 lb (83 kg)	1998-10-18	Hudson, Florida	Cedar Rapids (USHL)	WPG, 91st overall 2018
9	(United States)	Charlie Gerard	Senior	F	5' 9" (1.75 m)	183 lb (83 kg)	1995-11-19	Rocky River, Ohio	Madison Capitols (USHL)	—
10	(United States)	Shane McMahan	Sophomore	F	5' 11" (1.8 m)	201 lb (91 kg)	1996-07-30	Lakewood, Colorado	Fargo Force (USHL)	—
11	(United States)	Jared Spooner	Junior	D	6' 0" (1.83 m)	197 lb (89 kg)	1996-03-22	Bismarck, North Dakota	Green Bay Gamblers (USHL)	—
12	(United States)	Colby Bukes	Freshman	D	5' 11" (1.8 m)	184 lb (83 kg)	1999-02-01	Littleton, Colorado	Muskegon Lumberjacks (USHL)	—
14	(United States)	Ryan Sandelin	Freshman	F	6' 0" (1.83 m)	191 lb (87 kg)	1999-01-03	Hermantown, Minnesota	Penticton Vees (BCHL)	—
15	(Germany)	Julian Napravnik	Sophomore	F	5' 11" (1.8 m)	170 lb (77 kg)	1997-05-06	Bad Nauheim, Germany	Des Moines Buccaneers (USHL)	—
16	(United States)	Reggie Lutz	Junior	F	5' 10" (1.78 m)	175 lb (79 kg)	1996-10-18	Elk River, Minnesota	Chicago Steel (USHL)	—
17	(United States)	Walker Duehr	Junior	F	6' 2" (1.88 m)	211 lb (96 kg)	1997-11-23	Sioux Falls, South Dakota	Bloomington Thunder (USHL)	—
18	(United States)	Ian Scheid	Senior	D	5' 11" (1.8 m)	178 lb (81 kg)	1995-06-14	Coon Rapids, Minnesota	Sioux City Musketeers (USHL)	—
19	(Canada)	Chris Van Os-Shaw	Sophomore	F	6' 2" (1.88 m)	200 lb (91 kg)	1997-05-20	Regina, Saskatchewan	Spruce Grove Saints (AJHL)	—
20	(Germany)	Marc Michaelis (C)	Senior	F	5' 10" (1.78 m)	185 lb (84 kg)	1995-07-31	Mannheim, Germany	Green Bay Gamblers (USHL)	—
21	(United States)	Lucas Sowder	Freshman	F	5' 11" (1.8 m)	165 lb (75 kg)	1998-11-15	Trinity, Florida	Wenatchee Wild (BCHL)	—
22	(United States)	Dallas Gerads	Junior	F	5' 10" (1.78 m)	193 lb (88 kg)	1996-06-01	Blaine, Minnesota	Dubuque Fighting Saints (USHL)	—
23	(United States)	Nicholas Rivera (C)	Senior	F	5' 10" (1.78 m)	190 lb (86 kg)	1996-05-03	Pacific Palisades, California	Omaha Lancers (USHL)	—
24	(Canada)	Edwin Hookenson	Senior	D	6' 0" (1.83 m)	195 lb (88 kg)	1995-09-15	Lampman, Saskatchewan	Nanaimo Clippers (BCHL)	—
25	(United States)	Riese Zmolek	Junior	D	6' 1" (1.85 m)	201 lb (91 kg)	1996-09-12	Rochester, Minnesota	Cedar Rapids RoughRiders (USHL)	—
26	(United States)	Josh French	Senior	F	5' 11" (1.8 m)	182 lb (83 kg)	1995-12-18	Woodbury, Minnesota	Omaha Lancers (USHL)	—
27	(United States)	Tony Malinowski	Freshman	D	6' 3" (1.91 m)	195 lb (88 kg)	1999-10-15	Clarkston, Michigan	Des Moines Buccaneers (USHL)	—
28	(United States)	Cade Borchardt	Freshman	F	5' 10" (1.78 m)	187 lb (85 kg)	1998-07-06	Burnsville, Minnesota	Sioux Falls Stampede (USHL)	—
29	(United States)	Dryden McKay	Sophomore	G	5' 11" (1.8 m)	175 lb (79 kg)	1997-11-25	Downers Grove, Illinois	Madison Capitols (USHL)	—
31	(United States)	Jacob Berger	Sophomore	G	5' 11" (1.8 m)	162 lb (73 kg)	1997-07-01	Minnetonka, Minnesota	Merritt Centennials (BCHL)	—

== Standings ==
2019–20 Western Collegiate Hockey Association Standings
	Conference record								Overall record					
	GP	W	L	T	3/SW	PTS	GF	GA	GP	W	L	T	GF	GA
#2 Minnesota State	28	23	4	1	1	71	115	38	36	29	5	2	141	53
#11 Bemidji State	28	20	5	3	2	65	101	46	34	20	9	5	111	65
Northern Michigan	28	16	11	1	1	50	92	87	36	18	14	4	115	112
Alaska	28	14	9	5	2	49	73	65	34	16	13	5	84	86
Bowling Green	28	14	10	4	3	49	85	70	36	19	13	4	112	92
Michigan Tech	28	14	12	2	0	44	68	65	37	19	15	3	96	85
Lake Superior State	28	11	13	4	4	41	66	77	38	13	21	4	90	112
Alaska Anchorage	28	4	18	6	3	21	56	96	34	4	23	7	66	122
Ferris State	28	5	21	2	0	17	54	100	35	7	26	2	70	127
Alabama–Huntsville	28	2	20	6	1	13	50	116	34	2	26	6	57	145
Championship: March 21, 2020 † indicates conference regular season champion; * indicates conference tournament champion Rankings: USCHO.com Top 20 Poll; updated March 1, 2020

== Schedule and results ==
Date	Time	Opponent^{#}	Rank^{#}	Site	TV	Decision	Result	Attendance	Record
Exhibition
October 5	6:07 PM	vs. Mount Royal*	#3	Mankato Civic Center • Mankato, Minnesota (Exhibition)		McKay	W 5–2	2,951	
Regular season
October 11	7:07 PM	vs. Arizona State*	#3	Mankato Civic Center • Mankato, Minnesota		McKay	W 4–1	4,216	1–0–0
October 12	6:07 PM	vs. Arizona State*	#3	Mankato Civic Center • Mankato, Minnesota		McKay	W 5–0	4,439	2–0–0
October 18	7:07 PM	vs. #16 North Dakota*	#2	Mankato Civic Center • Mankato, Minnesota		McKay	T 4–4 ^{OT}	4,565	2–0–1
October 19	6:07 PM	vs. #16 North Dakota*	#2	Mankato Civic Center • Mankato, Minnesota		McKay	W 2–1	5,038	3–0–1
October 25	7:07 PM	at Alabama–Huntsville	#2	Von Braun Center • Huntsville, Alabama	FloHockey.tv	McKay	W 5–1	1,862	4–0–1 (1–0–0–0)
October 26	7:07 PM	at Alabama–Huntsville	#2	Von Braun Center • Huntsville, Alabama	FloHockey.tv	Stauber	W 4–1	3,084	5–0–1 (2–0–0–0)
November 1	7:07 PM	at #18 Bowling Green	#2	Mankato Civic Center • Mankato, Minnesota	FloHockey.tv	McKay	L 2–3 ^{OT}	4,114	5–1–1 (2–1–0–0)
November 2	6:07 PM	at #18 Bowling Green	#2	Mankato Civic Center • Mankato, Minnesota	FloHockey.tv	McKay	W 5–1	5,127	6–1–1 (3–1–0–0)
November 8	6:07 PM	at Michigan Tech	#3	MacInnes Student Ice Arena • Houghton, Michigan	FloHockey.tv	McKay	W 3–0	3,185	7–1–1 (4–1–0–0)
November 9	5:07 PM	at Michigan Tech	#3	MacInnes Student Ice Arena • Houghton, Michigan	FloHockey.tv	McKay	W 2–1	3,328	8–1–1 (5–1–0–0)
November 22	7:07 PM	vs. Alaska Anchorage	#1	Mankato Civic Center • Mankato, Minnesota	FloHockey.tv	McKay	W 7–1	4,037	9–1–1 (6–1–0–0)
November 23	6:07 PM	vs. Alaska Anchorage	#1	Mankato Civic Center • Mankato, Minnesota	FloHockey.tv	McKay	W 3–0	4,522	10–1–1 (7–1–0–0)
November 29	7:07 PM	at #8 Minnesota–Duluth*	#1	AMSOIL Arena • Duluth, Minnesota		McKay	W 4–1	5,494	11–1–1 (7–1–0–0)
November 30	7:07 PM	at #8 Minnesota–Duluth*	#1	AMSOIL Arena • Duluth, Minnesota		McKay	W 3–1	5,103	12–1–1 (7–1–0–0)
December 6	7:07 PM	vs. Lake Superior State	#1	Mankato Civic Center • Mankato, Minnesota	FloHockey.tv	McKay	W 5–1	4,330	13–1–1 (8–1–0–0)
December 7	6:07 PM	vs. Lake Superior State	#1	Mankato Civic Center • Mankato, Minnesota	FloHockey.tv	McKay	W 2–0	4,452	14–1–1 (9–1–0–0)
December 13	6:07 PM	vs. Northern Michigan	#1	Berry Events Center • Marquette, Michigan	FloHockey.tv	McKay	W 5–2	2,227	15–1–1 (10–1–0–0)
December 14	6:07 PM	vs. Northern Michigan	#1	Berry Events Center • Marquette, Michigan	FloHockey.tv	McKay	L 1–4	2,246	15–2–1 (10–2–0–0)
Mariucci Classic
December 28	4:00 PM	at St. Cloud State*	#2	3M Arena at Mariucci • Minneapolis, Minnesota (Mariucci Semifinal)		McKay	L 2–7	7,615	15–3–1 (10–2–0–0)
December 29	4:00 PM	vs. Bemidji State*	#2	3M Arena at Mariucci • Minneapolis, Minnesota (Mariucci Third Place)		McKay	W 2–0	6,772	16–3–1 (10–2–0–0)
January 3	7:07 PM	vs. Alaska	#3	Mankato Civic Center • Mankato, Minnesota	FloHockey.tv	McKay	W 4–0	3,554	17–3–1 (11–2–0–0)
January 4	6:07 PM	vs. Alaska	#3	Mankato Civic Center • Mankato, Minnesota	FloHockey.tv	McKay	W 3–1	4,065	18–3–1 (12–2–0–0)
January 10	7:07 PM	at Ferris State	#3	Ewigleben Arena • Big Rapids, Michigan	FloHockey.tv	McKay	W 5–0	850	19–3–1 (13–2–0–0)
January 11	6:07 PM	at Ferris State	#3	Ewigleben Arena • Big Rapids, Michigan	FloHockey.tv	McKay	W 5–1	1,100	20–3–1 (14–2–0–0)
January 17	7:07 PM	at #15 Bowling Green	#3	Slater Family Ice Arena • Bowling Green, Ohio	FloHockey.tv	McKay	W 6–3	2,042	21–3–1 (15–2–0–0)
January 18	7:07 PM	at #15 Bowling Green	#3	Slater Family Ice Arena • Bowling Green, Ohio	FloHockey.tv	McKay	W 3–2 ^{OT}	2,289	22–3–1 (16–2–0–0)
January 24	7:07 PM	vs. Bemidji State	#3	Mankato Civic Center • Mankato, Minnesota	FloHockey.tv	McKay	W 3–2	5,013	23–3–1 (17–2–0–0)
January 25	6:07 PM	vs. Bemidji State	#3	Mankato Civic Center • Mankato, Minnesota	FloHockey.tv	McKay	L 2–4	5,232	23–4–1 (17–3–0–0)
January 31	10:07 PM	at Alaska Anchorage	#3	Wells Fargo Sports Complex • Anchorage, Alaska	FloHockey.tv	McKay	W 7–1	666	24–4–1 (18–3–0–0)
February 1	8:07 PM	at Alaska Anchorage	#3	Wells Fargo Sports Complex • Anchorage, Alaska	FloHockey.tv	McKay	T 2–2 ^{SOW}	666	24–4–2 (18–3–1–1)
February 7	7:07 PM	vs. #15 Northern Michigan	#3	Mankato Civic Center • Mankato, Minnesota	FloHockey.tv	McKay	W 7–3	4,436	25–4–2 (19–3–1–1)
February 15	7:07 PM	vs. #15 Northern Michigan	#3	Mankato Civic Center • Mankato, Minnesota	FloHockey.tv	McKay	W 1–0	5,090	26–4–2 (20–3–1–1)
February 21	7:07 PM	vs. Alabama–Huntsville	#3	Mankato Civic Center • Mankato, Minnesota	FloHockey.tv	McKay	W 10–0	4,584	27–4–2 (21–3–1–1)
February 22	6:07 PM	vs. Alabama–Huntsville	#3	Mankato Civic Center • Mankato, Minnesota	FloHockey.tv	McKay	W 8–0	5,131	28–4–2 (22–3–1–1)
February 28	7:07 PM	at #11 Bemidji State	#2	Sanford Center • Bemidji, Minnesota	FloHockey.tv	McKay	L 1–3	3,612	28–5–2 (22–4–1–1)
February 29	6:07 PM	at #11 Bemidji State	#2	Sanford Center • Bemidji, Minnesota	FloHockey.tv	McKay	W 4–1	4,079	29–5–2 (23–4–1–1)
WCHA Tournament
March 6	8:07 PM	vs. Alaska Anchorage*	#3	Mankato Civic Center • Mankato, Minnesota (WCHA Quarterfinals Game 1)		McKay	W 8–1	3,090	30–5–2 (24–4–1–1)
March 7	7:07 PM	vs. Alaska Anchorage*	#3	Mankato Civic Center • Mankato, Minnesota (WCHA Quarterfinals Game 2)		McKay	W 4–2	3,417	31–5–2 (25–4–1–1)
Minnesota State Won Series 2–0
Remainder of Tournament Cancelled
*Non-conference game. ^{#}Rankings from USCHO.com Poll. All times are in Central Time.

== Scoring Statistics ==
Name	Position	Games	Goals	Assists	Points	PIM
Marc Michaelis	LW/C	31	20	24	44	8
Parker Tuomie	RW	37	14	23	37	16
Lucas Sowder	LW	31	6	25	31	4
Charlie Gerard	F	37	13	17	30	18
Nathan Smith	C	35	9	18	27	37
Julian Napravnik	RW	35	9	16	25	8
Dallas Gerads	LW	33	8	17	25	30
Reggie Lutz	RW	38	13	11	24	12
Connor Mackey	D	36	7	17	24	29
Ian Scheid	D	37	3	19	22	26
Jared Spooner	LW	31	9	10	19	35
Jake Jaremko	C/LW	24	8	8	16	12
Walker Duehr	RW	32	3	12	15	33
Nicholas Rivera	F	35	10	3	13	8
Josh French	F	37	5	8	13	0
Jack McNeely	D	38	4	9	13	16
Edwin Hookenson	D	38	3	10	13	23
Riese Zmolek	D	37	3	8	11	22
Andy Carroll	D	33	2	7	9	6
Wyatt Aamodt	D	18	1	3	4	12
Ryan Sandelin	C	22	1	3	4	4
Chris Van Os-Shaw	LW	15	2	1	3	21
Dryden McKay	G	37	0	2	2	2
Colby Bukes	D	2	0	1	1	0
Jaxson Stauber	G	1	0	0	0	0
Jacob Berger	G	2	0	0	0	0
Cade Borchardt	F	10	0	0	0	0
Bench	-	-	-	-	-	4
Total			153	272	425	386

== Goaltending statistics ==
Name	Games	Minutes	Wins	Losses	Ties	Goals against	Saves	Shut outs	SV %	GAA
Jaxson Stauber	1	60	1	0	0	1	14	0	.933	1.00
Dryden McKay	37	2156	30	4	2	47	761	10	.942	1.31
Jacob Berger	2	67	0	1	0	4	21	0	.840	3.58
Empty Net	-	12	-	-	-	4	-	-	-	-
Total	38	2296	31	5	2	56	796	10	.934	1.46

== Rankings ==
Poll	Week																							
Poll	Pre	1	2	3	4	5	6	7	8	9	10	11	12	13	14	15	16	17	18	19	20	21	22	23 (Final)
USCHO.com	3	3	2	2	2	3	1	1	1	1	1	2	3	3	3	3	3	3	3	3	2	3	2	3
USA Today	4	3	3	2	2	3	2	1	1	1	1	2	3	3	3	3	3	3	3	3	3	3	3	3
