= 2019–20 Ferris State Bulldogs men's ice hockey season =

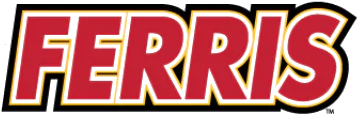
- Conference: WCHA
- Home ice: Ewigleben Arena

Rankings
- USCHO.com: NR
- USA Today/ US Hockey Magazine: NR

Record
- Overall: 7–26–2
- Conference: 5–21–2–0
- Home: 3–12–1
- Road: 4–12–1
- Neutral: 0–2–0

Coaches and captains
- Head coach: Bob Daniels
- Assistant coaches: Drew Famulak; Mark Kaufman
- Captain: Nate Kallen
- Alternate captain: Dominic Lutz

The 2019–20 Ferris State Bulldogs men's ice hockey season was the 45th season of play for the program and the 7th in the WCHA conference. The Bulldogs represented Ferris State University and were coached by Bob Daniels, in his 28th season.

== Roster ==
As of September 12, 2019.

No.	Nat.	Player	Class	Pos	Height	Weight	DoB	Hometown	Previous team	NHL rights
2	(United States)	Max Finner	Freshman	D	5' 11" (1.8 m)	160 lb (73 kg)	1998-10-09	Elmhurst, Illinois	Topeka Pilots (NAHL)	—
3	(United States)	Cameron Clarke	Senior	D	6' 2" (1.88 m)	193 lb (88 kg)	1996-05-15	Tecumseh, Michigan	Lone Star Brahmas (NAHL)	BOS, 136th overall 2016
4	(United States)	Zach Yoder	Senior	D	6' 5" (1.96 m)	200 lb (91 kg)	1994-08-14	Woodstock, Georgia	Air Force (AHA)	—
5	(United States)	Justin Smith	Sophomore	D	6' 1" (1.85 m)	185 lb (84 kg)	1999-06-26	East Lansing, Michigan	Topeka Pilots (NAHL)	—
6	(United States)	Blake Evennou	Freshman	D	5' 9" (1.75 m)	185 lb (84 kg)	1998-07-09	Macomb, Michigan	Lone Star Brahmas (WCHA)	—
7	(United States)	Connor Fedorek	Freshman	D	6' 0" (1.83 m)	175 lb (79 kg)	1999-03-27	Bethel Park, Pennsylvania	Odessa Jackalopes (CCHL)	—
9	(United States)	Lucas Finner	Junior	F	5' 10" (1.78 m)	172 lb (78 kg)	1997-02-05	Elmhurst, Illinois	Nanaimo Clippers (BCHL)	—
10	(United States)	Coale Norris	Junior	F	6' 2" (1.88 m)	205 lb (93 kg)	1997-05-25	Oxford, Michigan	Youngstown Phantoms (USHL)	—
11	(United States)	Dominic Lutz (A)	Senior	F	6' 1" (1.85 m)	219 lb (99 kg)	1996-01-19	Livonia, Michigan	Topeka Pilots (NAHL)	—
12	(United States)	Dallas Tulik	Freshman	F	6' 0" (1.83 m)	185 lb (84 kg)	1998-06-23	Kalamazoo, Michigan	Dubuque Fighting Saints (USHL)	—
15	(United States)	Jake Transit	Sophomore	F	5' 10" (1.78 m)	173 lb (78 kg)	1999-02-26	Royal Oak, Michigan	Dubuque Fighting Saints (USHL)	—
16	(United States)	Justin Michaelian	Sophomore	F	6' 0" (1.83 m)	190 lb (86 kg)	1997-12-07	Wixom, Michigan	Victoria Grizzlies (BCHL)	—
17	(United States)	Marshall Moise	Junior	F	6' 2" (1.88 m)	207 lb (94 kg)	1997-10-11	St. Clair Shores, Michigan	Youngstown Phantoms (USHL)	—
18	(United States)	Hunter Wendt	Sophomore	F	5' 7" (1.7 m)	173 lb (78 kg)	1997-10-27	Troy, Michigan	Fairbanks Ice Dogs (NAHL)	—
19	(Sweden)	Oskar Andrén	Senior	F	6' 1" (1.85 m)	185 lb (84 kg)	1995-03-29	Stockholm, Sweden	Boston University (HEA)	—
20	(Canada)	Liam MacDougall	Junior	F	5' 11" (1.8 m)	187 lb (85 kg)	1997-12-18	Windsor, Ontario	LaSalle Vipers (GOJHL)	—
21	(United States)	Jason Brancheau	Freshman	F	5' 8" (1.73 m)	158 lb (72 kg)	1999-08-15	Ecorse, Michigan	Amarillo Bulls (NAHL)	—
22	(United States)	Jason Tackett	Senior	F	6' 0" (1.83 m)	180 lb (82 kg)	1995-08-13	West Chester, Ohio	Kemptville 73's (CCHL)	—
23	(United States)	Nate Kallen (C)	Senior	D	6' 1" (1.85 m)	192 lb (87 kg)	1997-11-05	San Diego, California	Muskegon Lumberjacks (USHL)	—
24	(United States)	Brenden Rons	Freshman	D	6' 6" (1.98 m)	215 lb (98 kg)	1998-03-03	Farmington Hills, Michigan	Topeka Pilots (NAHL)	—
25	(United States)	Jake Willets	Freshman	D	6' 1" (1.85 m)	195 lb (88 kg)	1999-08-06	Erie, Michigan	Amarillo Bulls (NAHL)	—
26	(United States)	Joe Rutkowski	Senior	D	5' 10" (1.78 m)	172 lb (78 kg)	1997-02-23	Crystal Lake, Illinois	Sioux Falls Stampede (USHL)	—
27	(Canada)	Cade Kowalski	Freshman	F	5' 11" (1.8 m)	180 lb (82 kg)	1999-06-15	Morden, Manitoba	Flin Flon Bombers (SJHL)	—
28	(United States)	Brenden MacLaren	Freshman	F	5' 11" (1.8 m)	195 lb (88 kg)	1998-11-30	Sault Ste. Marie, Michigan	Fairbanks Ice Dogs (NAHL)	—
29	(United States)	Ethan Stewart	Sophomore	F	6' 1" (1.85 m)	200 lb (91 kg)	1997-02-10	Rockford, Illinois	Springfield Jr. Blues (NAHL)	—
30	(Finland)	Roni Salmenkangas	Sophomore	G	6' 0" (1.83 m)	170 lb (77 kg)	1999-03-28	Tampere, Finland	HPK U20 (Nuorten SM-liiga)	—
31	(United States)	Austin Shaw	Senior	G	6' 4" (1.93 m)	210 lb (95 kg)	1996-06-20	Highlands Ranch, Colorado	Princeton (ECAC)	—
35	(United States)	Carter McPhail	Freshman	G	5' 10" (1.78 m)	175 lb (79 kg)	1998-12-04	Fenton, Michigan	Johnstown Tomahawks (NAHL)	—

== Standings ==
2019–20 Western Collegiate Hockey Association Standings
	Conference record								Overall record					
	GP	W	L	T	3/SW	PTS	GF	GA	GP	W	L	T	GF	GA
#2 Minnesota State	28	23	4	1	1	71	115	38	36	29	5	2	141	53
#11 Bemidji State	28	20	5	3	2	65	101	46	34	20	9	5	111	65
Northern Michigan	28	16	11	1	1	50	92	87	36	18	14	4	115	112
Alaska	28	14	9	5	2	49	73	65	34	16	13	5	84	86
Bowling Green	28	14	10	4	3	49	85	70	36	19	13	4	112	92
Michigan Tech	28	14	12	2	0	44	68	65	37	19	15	3	96	85
Lake Superior State	28	11	13	4	4	41	66	77	38	13	21	4	90	112
Alaska Anchorage	28	4	18	6	3	21	56	96	34	4	23	7	66	122
Ferris State	28	5	21	2	0	17	54	100	35	7	26	2	70	127
Alabama–Huntsville	28	2	20	6	1	13	50	116	34	2	26	6	57	145
Championship: March 21, 2020 † indicates conference regular season champion; * indicates conference tournament champion Rankings: USCHO.com Top 20 Poll; updated March 1, 2020

== Schedule and results ==
Date	Time	Opponent^{#}	Rank^{#}	Site	TV	Decision	Result	Attendance	Record
Exhibition
October 6	2:00 PM	vs. Waterloo*		Ewigleben Arena • Big Rapids, Michigan (Exhibition)		McPhail	T 2–2 ^{OT}	1,276	
October 8	7:07 PM	vs. USNTDP*		Ewigleben Arena • Big Rapids, Michigan (Exhibition)		McPhail	W 5–0	1,058	
Regular season
October 10	7:07 PM	vs. Colgate*		Ewigleben Arena • Big Rapids, Michigan		Salmenkangas	W 3–1	1,129	1–0–0
October 18	7:05 PM	at Miami*		Steve Cady Arena • Oxford, Ohio		McPhail	L 3–4	2,341	1–1–0
October 19	8:00 PM	at Miami*		Steve Cady Arena • Oxford, Ohio		Salmenkangas	W 3–1	2,319	2–1–0
October 25	7:07 PM	vs. Northern Michigan		Ewigleben Arena • Big Rapids, Michigan	FloHockey.tv	Salmenkangas	L 3–4	1,832	2–2–0 (0–1–0–0)
October 26	6:07 PM	vs. Northern Michigan		Ewigleben Arena • Big Rapids, Michigan	FloHockey.tv	McPhail	L 4–6	2,500	2–3–0 (0–2–0–0)
November 1	7:07 PM	at Lake Superior State		Taffy Abel Arena • Sault Ste. Marie, Michigan	FloHockey.tv	Salmenkangas	L 4–5 ^{OT}	1,746	2–4–0 (0–3–0–0)
November 2	7:07 PM	at Lake Superior State		Taffy Abel Arena • Sault Ste. Marie, Michigan	FloHockey.tv	McPhail	L 3–4	2,146	2–5–0 (0–4–0–0)
November 8	7:05 PM	at Western Michigan*		Lawson Arena • Kalamazoo, Michigan		Shaw	L 2–4	3,794	2–6–0 (0–4–0–0)
November 9	8:07 PM	vs. Western Michigan*		Ewigleben Arena • Big Rapids, Michigan		Salmenkangas	L 2–8	1,855	2–7–0 (0–4–0–0)
November 15	7:07 PM	vs. Bemidji State		Ewigleben Arena • Big Rapids, Michigan	FloHockey.tv	Shaw	W 2–1	1,160	3–7–0 (1–4–0–0)
November 16	6:07 PM	vs. Bemidji State		Ewigleben Arena • Big Rapids, Michigan	FloHockey.tv	Shaw	L 1–4	1,020	3–8–0 (1–5–0–0)
November 22	11:07 PM	at Alaska		Carlson Center • Fairbanks, Alaska	FloHockey.tv	McPhail	W 3–2	1,508	4–8–0 (2–5–0–0)
November 23	11:07 PM	vs. Alaska		Carlson Center • Fairbanks, Alaska	FloHockey.tv	McPhail	L 1–3	1,475	4–9–0 (2–6–0–0)
November 29	11:07 PM	at Alaska Anchorage		Wells Fargo Sports Complex • Anchorage, Alaska	FloHockey.tv	Shaw	W 4–1	712	5–9–0 (3–6–0–0)
November 30	9:07 PM	at Alaska Anchorage		Wells Fargo Sports Complex • Anchorage, Alaska	FloHockey.tv	McPhail	T 4–4 ^{SOL}	742	5–9–1 (3–6–1–0)
December 13	7:07 PM	vs. Alabama–Huntsville		Ewigleben Arena • Big Rapids, Michigan	FloHockey.tv	Shaw	T 2–2 ^{3x3 OTW}	920	5–9–2 (3–6–2–1)
December 14	7:37 PM	vs. Alabama–Huntsville		Ewigleben Arena • Big Rapids, Michigan	FloHockey.tv	Shaw	W 3–1	1,030	6–9–2 (4–6–2–1)
Great Lakes Invitational
December 30	4:07 PM	vs. Michigan*		Little Caesars Arena • Detroit, Michigan (GLI Semifinal)		Shaw	L 1–4	16,139	6–10–2 (4–6–2–1)
December 31	11:37 AM	vs. Michigan State*		Little Caesars Arena • Detroit, Michigan (GLI Third Place)		Salmenkangas	L 2–5	10,240	6–11–2 (4–6–2–1)
January 3	8:07 PM	at Bemidji State		Sanford Center • Bemidji, Minnesota	FloHockey.tv	Shaw	L 2–5	2,317	6–12–2 (4–7–2–1)
January 4	7:07 PM	at Bemidji State		Sanford Center • Bemidji, Minnesota	FloHockey.tv	Shaw	L 1–4	3,127	6–13–2 (4–8–2–1)
January 10	7:07 PM	vs. #3 Minnesota State		Ewigleben Arena • Big Rapids, Michigan	FloHockey.tv	Salmenkangas	L 0–5	850	6–14–2 (4–9–2–1)
January 11	6:07 PM	vs. #3 Minnesota State		Ewigleben Arena • Big Rapids, Michigan	FloHockey.tv	McPhail	L 1–5	1,100	6–15–2 (4–10–2–1)
January 17	7:07 PM	vs. Alaska		Ewigleben Arena • Big Rapids, Michigan	FloHockey.tv	Shaw	L 0–2	1,138	6–16–2 (4–11–2–1)
January 18	6:07 PM	vs. Alaska		Ewigleben Arena • Big Rapids, Michigan	FloHockey.tv	McPhail	L 3–6	1,600	6–17–2 (4–12–2–1)
January 24	7:07 PM	at Michigan Tech		MacInnes Student Ice Arena • Houghton, Michigan	FloHockey.tv	Salmenkangas	L 1–2	2,705	6–18–2 (4–13–2–1)
January 25	6:07 PM	at Michigan Tech		MacInnes Student Ice Arena • Houghton, Michigan	FloHockey.tv	Salmenkangas	W 2–1	2,928	7–18–2 (5–13–2–1)
January 31	7:07 PM	at #15 Northern Michigan		Berry Events Center • Marquette, Michigan	FloHockey.tv	Salmenkangas	L 2–5	2,890	7–19–2 (5–14–2–1)
February 1	6:07 PM	at #15 Northern Michigan		Berry Events Center • Marquette, Michigan	FloHockey.tv	Salmenkangas	L 2–5	3,738	7–20–2 (5–15–2–1)
February 14	7:07 PM	vs. Michigan Tech		Ewigleben Arena • Big Rapids, Michigan	FloHockey.tv	Salmenkangas	L 2–3	1,341	7–21–2 (5–16–2–1)
February 15	6:07 PM	vs. Michigan Tech		Ewigleben Arena • Big Rapids, Michigan	FloHockey.tv	Shaw	L 0–2	1,963	7–22–2 (5–17–2–1)
February 21	7:07 PM	at Bowling Green		Slater Family Ice Arena • Bowling Green, Ohio	FloHockey.tv	Shaw	L 1–6	2,509	7–23–2 (5–18–2–1)
February 22	7:07 PM	at Bowling Green		Slater Family Ice Arena • Bowling Green, Ohio	FloHockey.tv	Salmenkangas	L 1–3	4,350	7–24–2 (5–19–2–1)
February 28	7:07 PM	vs. Lake Superior State		Ewigleben Arena • Big Rapids, Michigan	FloHockey.tv	Salmenkangas	L 0–5	1,717	7–25–2 (5–20–2–1)
February 29	6:07 PM	vs. Lake Superior State		Ewigleben Arena • Big Rapids, Michigan	FloHockey.tv	Shaw	L 2–4	1,802	7–26–2 (5–21–2–1)
*Non-conference game. ^{#}Rankings from USCHO.com Poll. All times are in Eastern Time.

== Scoring Statistics ==
Name	Position	Games	Goals	Assists	Points	PIM
Jake Willets	D	35	3	19	22	35
Marshall Moise	F	26	10	6	16	31
Nate Kallen	D	35	6	10	16	18
Jason Tackett	LW	29	4	12	16	6
Blake Evennou	D	35	1	14	15	38
Liam MacDougall	F	35	2	11	13	18
Joe Rutkowski	D	32	2	10	12	14
Jake Transit	F	35	6	5	11	48
Zach Yoder	D	35	4	7	11	48
Justin Michaelian	F	33	7	3	10	12
Coale Norris	LW	25	6	2	8	29
Dalla Tulik	F	26	4	3	7	16
Hunter Wendt	F	31	2	5	7	23
Cameron Clarke	D	27	1	6	7	4
Brendan MacLaren	F	29	3	2	5	31
Connor Fedorek	D	31	1	4	5	20
Lucas Finner	LW	5	4	0	4	23
Oskar Andrén	RW	16	1	2	3	21
Jason Brancheau	F	18	0	3	3	2
Dominic Lutz	W	34	1	1	2	34
Max Finner	D	23	0	2	2	25
Brenden Rons	D	20	1	0	1	4
Cade Kowalski	C/RW	30	1	0	1	8
Austin Shaw	G	15	0	1	1	2
Roni Salmenkangas	G	17	0	1	1	0
Justin Smith	D	9	0	0	0	8
Ethan Stewart	F	9	0	0	0	6
Carter McPhail	G	9	0	0	0	0
Total						

== Goaltending statistics ==
Name	Games	Minutes	Wins	Losses	Ties	Goals against	Saves	Shut outs	SV %	GAA
Austin Shaw	15	779	3	9	1	39	326	0	.893	3.00
Roni Salmenkangas	17	883	3	11	0	52	429	0	.879	3.51
Carter McPhail	9	433	1	6	1	27	209	0	.886	3.74
Empty Net	-	18	-	-	-	9	9	-	-	-
Total	35	2114	7	26	2	127	912	0	.878	3.60

== Rankings ==
Poll	Week																							
Poll	Pre	1	2	3	4	5	6	7	8	9	10	11	12	13	14	15	16	17	18	19	20	21	22	23 (Final)
USCHO.com	NR	NR	NR	NR	NR	NR	NR	NR	NR	NR	NR	NR	NR	NR	NR	NR	NR	NR	NR	NR	NR	NR	NR	NR
USA Today	NR	NR	NR	NR	NR	NR	NR	NR	NR	NR	NR	NR	NR	NR	NR	NR	NR	NR	NR	NR	NR	NR	NR	NR
