= 2019–20 Bemidji State Beavers men's ice hockey season =

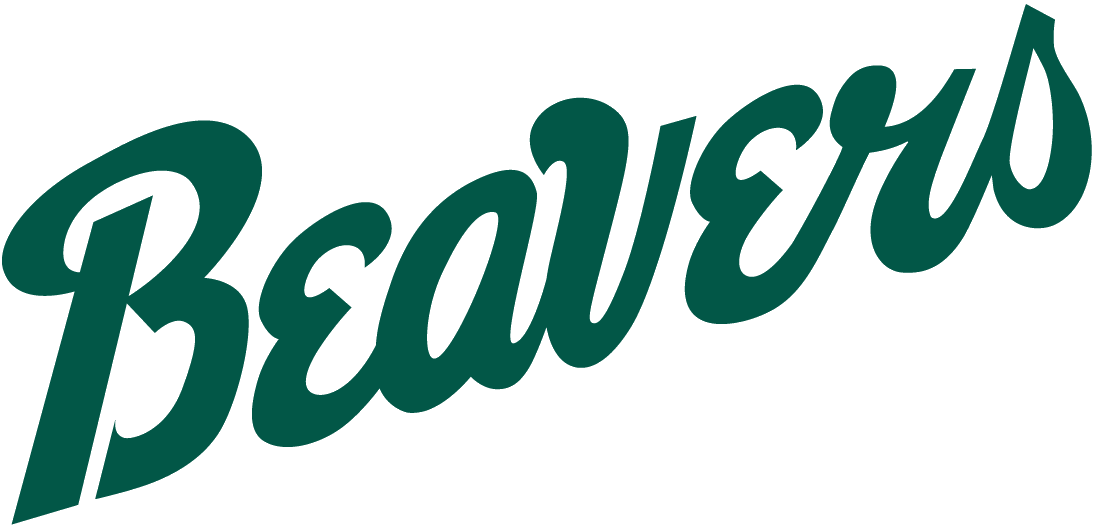
- Conference: 2nd WCHA
- Home ice: Sanford Center

Rankings
- USCHO.com: 11
- USA Today/ US Hockey Magazine: 11

Record
- Overall: 22–10–5
- Conference: 20–5–3–2
- Home: 13–3–3
- Road: 9–6–2
- Neutral: 0–1–0

Coaches and captains
- Head coach: Tom Serratore
- Assistant coaches: Travis Winter; Eddie Olczyk III; Red Brow
- Captain(s): Tommy Muck; Adam Brady
- Alternate captain(s): Hampus Sjödahl; Ethan Somoza

The 2019–20 Bemidji State Beavers men's ice hockey season was the 64th season of play for the program, the 21st at the Division I level and the 10th in the WCHA conference. The Beavers represented Bemidji State University and were coached by Tom Serratore, in his 19th season.

The team's season ended abruptly when the WCHA announced that the remainder of the tournament was cancelled due to the COVID-19 pandemic in the United States on March 12, 2020.

== Roster ==
As of September 9, 2019.

No.	Nat.	Player	Class	Pos	Height	Weight	DoB	Hometown	Previous team	NHL rights
2	(United States)	Will Zmolek	Freshman	D	6' 3" (1.91 m)	194 lb (88 kg)	1999-04-02	Rochester, Minnesota	Cedar Rapids RoughRiders (USHL)	—
3	(United States)	Tommy Muck (C)	Senior	D	5' 10" (1.78 m)	190 lb (86 kg)	1996-01-05	Eagan, Minnesota	Madison Capitols (USHL)	—
5	(United States)	Nick Leitner	Freshman	D	6' 0" (1.83 m)	185 lb (84 kg)	1998-04-17	Bemidji, Minnesota	Green Bay Gamblers (USHL)	—
6	(Slovakia)	Sam Solenský	Freshman	F	5' 10" (1.78 m)	176 lb (80 kg)	1998-08-25	Michalovce, Slovakia	Johnstown Tomahawks (NAHL)	—
7	(United States)	Kyle Looft	Freshman	D	6' 3" (1.91 m)	192 lb (87 kg)	1998-06-27	Mankato, Minnesota	Cedar Rapids RoughRiders (USHL)	—
8	(United States)	Darby Gula	Sophomore	D	5' 10" (1.78 m)	180 lb (82 kg)	1998-01-08	Steinbach, Manitoba	Steinbach Pistons (MJHL)	—
9	(United States)	Ethan Somoza (A)	Junior	F	5' 11" (1.8 m)	189 lb (86 kg)	1996-05-17	Simi Valley, California	Bloomington Thunder (USHL)	—
11	(United States)	Charlie Combs	Junior	F	5' 7" (1.7 m)	195 lb (88 kg)	1996-07-13	St. Louis, Missouri	Wenatchee Wild (BCHL)	—
12	(Canada)	Owen Sillinger	Sophomore	F	5' 10" (1.78 m)	182 lb (83 kg)	1997-09-23	Regina, Saskatchewan	Penticton Vees (BCHL)	—
13	(United States)	Carter Jones	Freshman	F	5' 9" (1.75 m)	165 lb (75 kg)	1999-05-15	Hillyard, Washington	Trail Smoke Eaters (BCHL)	—
14	(Canada)	Alex Ierullo	Sophomore	F	5' 9" (1.75 m)	172 lb (78 kg)	1997-07-30	Woodbridge, Ontario	Newmarket Hurricanes (OJHL)	—
15	(Canada)	Tyler Jubenvill	Sophomore	D	5' 11" (1.8 m)	193 lb (88 kg)	1999-11-30	Gilbert Plains, Manitoba	Cedar Rapids RoughRiders (USHL)	—
16	(United States)	Aaron Miller	Junior	F	5' 9" (1.75 m)	172 lb (78 kg)	1995-12-20	Superior, Wisconsin	Minnesota Wilderness (NAHL)	—
17	(Canada)	Ross Armour	Sophomore	F	6' 2" (1.88 m)	174 lb (79 kg)	1998-02-07	Trail, British Columbia	Trail Smoke Eaters (BCHL)	—
18	(United States)	Brad Johnson	Junior	D	5' 9" (1.75 m)	186 lb (84 kg)	1996-01-23	Chesterfield, Missouri	Fargo Force (USHL)	—
19	(Canada)	Adam Brady (C)	Senior	F	5' 11" (1.8 m)	202 lb (92 kg)	1995-08-06	Delhi, Ontario	Lincoln Stars (USHL)	—
20	(Canada)	Brad Belisle	Freshman	F	6' 2" (1.88 m)	194 lb (88 kg)	1998-01-26	Thunder Bay, Ontario	Aberdeen Wings (NAHL)	—
21	(United States)	Brendan Harris	Junior	F	5' 7" (1.7 m)	161 lb (73 kg)	1996-07-10	Henderson, Nevada	Wenatchee Wild (BCHL)	—
22	(United States)	Tyler Vold	Junior	D	5' 10" (1.78 m)	183 lb (83 kg)	1996-09-01	Andover, Minnesota	Minnesota Wilderness (NAHL)	—
23	(Sweden)	Hampus Sjödahl (A)	Senior	F	6' 3" (1.91 m)	215 lb (98 kg)	1995-09-27	Stockholm, Sweden	Odessa Jackalopes (NAHL)	—
25	(United States)	Alex Adams	Sophomore	F	6' 1" (1.85 m)	191 lb (87 kg)	1997-12-30	Grand Rapids, Minnesota	Minot Minotauros (NAHL)	—
26	(United States)	Nick Cardelli	Sophomore	F	5' 10" (1.78 m)	171 lb (78 kg)	1997-06-06	Wood Dale, Illinois	Youngstown Phantoms (USHL)	—
27	(Canada)	Tyler Kirkup	Sophomore	F	6' 0" (1.83 m)	203 lb (92 kg)	1998-04-03	Virden, Manitoba	Virden Oil Capitals (MJHL)	—
28	(Sweden)	Elias Rosén	Freshman	D	5' 10" (1.78 m)	176 lb (80 kg)	1999-01-04	Mora, Sweden	Tri-City Storm (USHL)	—
29	(United States)	Henry Johnson	Junior	G	6' 0" (1.83 m)	179 lb (81 kg)	1996-01-10	Minneapolis, Minnesota	Brockville Braves (CCHL)	—
33	(United States)	Zach Driscoll	Junior	G	6' 0" (1.83 m)	172 lb (78 kg)	1997-02-25	Apple Valley, Minnesota	Omaha Lancers (USHL)	—
35	(United States)	Michael Carr	Freshman	G	6' 0" (1.83 m)	179 lb (81 kg)	1998-06-08	Columbus, Ohio	Cornwall Colts (CCHL)	—

== Standings ==
2019–20 Western Collegiate Hockey Association Standings
	Conference record								Overall record					
	GP	W	L	T	3/SW	PTS	GF	GA	GP	W	L	T	GF	GA
#2 Minnesota State	28	23	4	1	1	71	115	38	36	29	5	2	141	53
#11 Bemidji State	28	20	5	3	2	65	101	46	34	20	9	5	111	65
Northern Michigan	28	16	11	1	1	50	92	87	36	18	14	4	115	112
Alaska	28	14	9	5	2	49	73	65	34	16	13	5	84	86
Bowling Green	28	14	10	4	3	49	85	70	36	19	13	4	112	92
Michigan Tech	28	14	12	2	0	44	68	65	37	19	15	3	96	85
Lake Superior State	28	11	13	4	4	41	66	77	38	13	21	4	90	112
Alaska Anchorage	28	4	18	6	3	21	56	96	34	4	23	7	66	122
Ferris State	28	5	21	2	0	17	54	100	35	7	26	2	70	127
Alabama–Huntsville	28	2	20	6	1	13	50	116	34	2	26	6	57	145
Championship: March 21, 2020 † indicates conference regular season champion; * indicates conference tournament champion Rankings: USCHO.com Top 20 Poll; updated March 1, 2020

== Schedule and results ==
Date	Time	Opponent^{#}	Rank^{#}	Site	TV	Decision	Result	Attendance	Record
Regular season
October 11	7:07 PM	vs. #7 St. Cloud State*		Sanford Center • Bemidji, Minnesota		Driscoll	T 4–4 ^{OT}	3,445	0–0–1
October 12	6:07 PM	vs. #7 St. Cloud State*		Sanford Center • Bemidji, Minnesota		Johnson	T 2–2 ^{OT}	3,792	0–0–2
October 25	7:37 PM	at #16 North Dakota*		Ralph Engelstad Arena • Grand Forks, North Dakota		Driscoll	L 1–2 ^{OT}	11,305	0–1–2
October 26	7:07 PM	at #16 North Dakota*		Ralph Engelstad Arena • Grand Forks, North Dakota		Johnson	L 1–4	11,517	0–2–2
November 1	10:07 PM	at Alaska		Carlson Center • Fairbanks, Alaska	FloHockey.tv	Driscoll	W 4–0	1,470	1–2–2 (1–0–0–0)
November 2	10:07 PM	at Alaska		Carlson Center • Fairbanks, Alaska	FloHockey.tv	Driscoll	L 1–3	1,470	1–3–2 (1–1–0–0)
November 8	7:07 PM	vs. Lake Superior State		Sanford Center • Bemidji, Minnesota	FloHockey.tv	Driscoll	W 7–1	2,955	2–3–2 (2–1–0–0)
November 9	6:07 PM	vs. Lake Superior State		Sanford Center • Bemidji, Minnesota	FloHockey.tv	Driscoll	W 5–1	2,415	3–3–2 (3–1–0–0)
November 15	6:07 PM	at Ferris State		Ewigleben Arena • Big Rapids, Michigan	FloHockey.tv	Driscoll	L 1–2	1,160	3–4–2 (3–2–0–0)
November 16	5:07 PM	at Ferris State		Ewigleben Arena • Big Rapids, Michigan	FloHockey.tv	Driscoll	L 4–1	1,020	4–4–2 (4–2–0–0)
November 22	7:07 PM	vs. Alabama–Huntsville		Sanford Center • Bemidji, Minnesota	FloHockey.tv	Driscoll	W 5–3	3,007	5–4–2 (5–2–0–0)
November 23	6:07 PM	vs. Alabama–Huntsville		Sanford Center • Bemidji, Minnesota	FloHockey.tv	Driscoll	W 7–0	3,112	6–4–2 (6–2–0–0)
November 29	6:07 PM	at Lake Superior State		Taffy Abel Arena • Sault Ste. Marie, Michigan	FloHockey.tv	Driscoll	W 4–1	1,751	7–4–2 (7–2–0–0)
November 30	4:07 PM	at Lake Superior State		Taffy Abel Arena • Sault Ste. Marie, Michigan	FloHockey.tv	Driscoll	T 2–2 ^{3x3 OTL}	1,433	7–4–3 (7–2–1–0)
December 6	7:07 PM	vs. Alaska		Sanford Center • Bemidji, Minnesota	FloHockey.tv	Driscoll	W 3–1	2,547	8–4–3 (8–2–1–0)
December 7	6:07 PM	vs. Alaska		Sanford Center • Bemidji, Minnesota	FloHockey.tv	Driscoll	L 3–5	2,516	8–5–3 (8–3–1–0)
Mariucci Classic
December 28	7:05 PM	at Minnesota*		3M Arena at Mariucci • Minneapolis, Minnesota (Mariucci Semifinal)	FSN+	Driscoll	L 2–5	7,615	8–6–3 (8–3–1–0)
December 29	4:00 PM	vs. #2 Minnesota State*		3M Arena at Mariucci • Minneapolis, Minnesota (Mariucci)		Johnson	L 0–2	6,772	8–7–3 (8–3–1–0)
January 3	7:07 PM	vs. Ferris State		Sanford Center • Bemidji, Minnesota	FloHockey.tv	Johnson	W 5–2	2,317	9–7–3 (9–3–1–0)
January 4	6:07 PM	vs. Ferris State		Sanford Center • Bemidji, Minnesota	FloHockey.tv	Driscoll	W 4–1	3,127	10–7–3 (10–3–1–0)
January 9	7:37 PM	at Alabama–Huntsville		Von Braun Center • Huntsville, Alabama	FloHockey.tv	Driscoll	W 3–1	949	11–7–3 (11–3–1–0)
January 10	7:37 PM	at Alabama–Huntsville		Von Braun Center • Huntsville, Alabama	FloHockey.tv	Driscoll	W 4–3	1,207	12–7–3 (12–3–1–0)
January 17	7:07 PM	vs. #19 Michigan Tech		Sanford Center • Bemidji, Minnesota	FloHockey.tv	Driscoll	W 4–1	2,617	13–7–3 (13–3–1–0)
January 18	6:07 PM	vs. #19 Michigan Tech		Sanford Center • Bemidji, Minnesota	FloHockey.tv	Driscoll	T 1–1 ^{3x3 OTW}	2,702	13–7–4 (13–3–2–1)
January 24	7:07 PM	at #3 Minnesota State		Mankato Civic Center • Mankato, Minnesota	FloHockey.tv	Driscoll	L 2–3	5,013	13–8–4 (13–4–2–1)
January 25	6:07 PM	at #3 Minnesota State		Mankato Civic Center • Mankato, Minnesota	FloHockey.tv	Driscoll	W 4–2	5,232	14–8–4 (14–4–2–1)
January 31	7:07 PM	vs. Bowling Green	#19	Sanford Center • Bemidji, Minnesota	FloHockey.tv	Driscoll	W 4–1	2,710	15–8–4 (15–4–2–1)
February 1	6:07 PM	vs. Bowling Green	#19	Sanford Center • Bemidji, Minnesota	FloHockey.tv	Driscoll	W 4–2	3,109	16–8–4 (16–4–2–1)
February 14	6:07 PM	at #19 Northern Michigan	#16	Berry Events Center • Marquette, Michigan	FloHockey.tv	Driscoll	W 5–0	2,208	17–8–4 (17–4–2–1)
February 15	5:07 PM	at #19 Northern Michigan	#16	Berry Events Center • Marquette, Michigan	FloHockey.tv	Driscoll	W 5–1	3,383	18–8–4 (18–4–2–1)
February 21	10:07 PM	at Alaska Anchorage	#13	Wells Fargo Sports Complex • Anchorage, Alaska	FloHockey.tv	Driscoll	W 4–1	666	19–8–4 (19–4–2–1)
February 22	8:07 PM	at Alaska Anchorage	#13	Wells Fargo Sports Complex • Anchorage, Alaska	FloHockey.tv	Driscoll	T 2–2 ^{OTW}	666	19–8–5 (19–4–3–2)
February 28	7:07 PM	vs. #2 Minnesota State	#11	Sanford Center • Bemidji, Minnesota	FloHockey.tv	Driscoll	W 3–1	3,612	20–8–5 (20–4–3–2)
February 29	6:07 PM	vs. #2 Minnesota State	#11	Sanford Center • Bemidji, Minnesota	FloHockey.tv	Driscoll	L 1–4	4,079	20–9–5 (20–5–3–2)
WCHA Tournament
March 6	7:07 PM	vs. Lake Superior State*	#10	Sanford Center • Bemidji, Minnesota (WCHA Quarterfinals Game 1)	FloHockey.tv	Driscoll	W 2–0	2,042	21–9–5 (20–5–3–2)
March 7	6:07 PM	vs. Lake Superior State*	#10	Sanford Center • Bemidji, Minnesota (WCHA Quarterfinals Game 2)	FloHockey.tv	Driscoll	L 3–5	2,167	21–10–5 (20–5–3–2)
March 8	6:07 PM	vs. Lake Superior State*	#10	Sanford Center • Bemidji, Minnesota (WCHA Quarterfinals Game 3)	FloHockey.tv	Driscoll	W 3–1	1,766	22–10–5 (20–5–3–2)
Bemidji State Won Series 2–1
Remainder of Tournament Cancelled
*Non-conference game. ^{#}Rankings from USCHO.com Poll. All times are in Central Time.

== Scoring statistics ==
Name	Position	Games	Goals	Assists	Points	PIM
Adam Brady	C	37	19	15	34	2
Owen Sillinger	C	37	14	20	34	36
Aaron Miller	F	36	12	17	29	61
Elias Rosén	D	35	5	19	24	10
Alex Ierullo	LW	37	7	14	21	25
Tommy Muck	D	37	4	16	20	10
Charlie Combs	LW	33	12	6	18	18
Ethan Somoza	LW	37	6	12	18	10
Nick Cardelli	RW	31	8	9	17	18
Alex Adams	F	35	8	6	14	19
Brad Johnson	D	35	6	7	13	32
Tyler Kirkup	C/LW	36	4	9	13	16
Hampus Sjödahl	LW	34	3	9	12	8
Tyler Vold	D	37	2	6	8	4
Ross Armour	F	26	4	3	7	8
Carter Jones	F	30	2	5	7	2
Will Zmolek	D	37	0	7	7	20
Brendan Harris	C	11	0	4	4	15
Kyle Looft	D	33	0	4	4	4
Sam Solenský	C/RW	10	1	1	2	2
Tyler Jubenvill	D	27	0	2	2	6
Zach Driscoll	G	33	0	2	2	0
Nick Leitner	D	5	1	0	1	2
Darby Gula	D	17	1	0	1	2
Henry Johnson	G	4	0	0	0	0
Brad Belisle	C	10	0	0	0	2
Bench	-	-	-	-	-	6
Total			119	193	312	338

== Goaltending statistics ==
Name	Games	Minutes	Wins	Losses	Ties	Goals against	Saves	Shut outs	SV %	GAA
Zach Driscoll	33	1989	21	8	4	54	808	4	.937	1.63
Henry Johnson	4	240	1	2	1	9	90	0	.909	2.24
Empty Net	-	16	-	-	-	8	-	-	-	-
Total	37	2245	22	10	5	71	898	4	.927	1.90

== Rankings ==
Poll	Week																							
Poll	Pre	1	2	3	4	5	6	7	8	9	10	11	12	13	14	15	16	17	18	19	20	21	22	23 (Final)
USCHO.com	NR	NR	NR	NR	NR	NR	NR	NR	NR	NR	NR	NR	NR	NR	NR	NR	19	18	16	13	11	10	11	11
USA Today	NR	NR	NR	NR	NR	NR	NR	NR	NR	NR	NR	NR	NR	NR	NR	NR	NR	NR	NR	13	11	10	11	11
