= 2019–20 Bowling Green Falcons men's ice hockey season =

- Conference: WCHA
- Home ice: Slater Family Ice Arena

Rankings
- USCHO.com: NR
- USA Today/ US Hockey Magazine: NR

Record
- Overall: 21–13–4
- Conference: 14–10–4–3
- Home: 9–7–1
- Road: 12–4–3
- Neutral: 0–2–0

Coaches and captains
- Head coach: Ty Eigner
- Assistant coaches: Curtis Carr; Maco Balkovec

The 2019–20 Bowling Green Falcons men's ice hockey season was the 51st season of play for the program and the 7th in the WCHA conference. The Falcons represented Bowling Green State University and were coached by Ty Eigner, in his 1st season.

The team's season ended abruptly when the WCHA announced that the remainder of the tournament was cancelled due to the COVID-19 pandemic in the United States on March 12, 2020.

== Roster ==
As of September 9, 2019.

No.	Nat.	Player	Class	Pos	Height	Weight	DoB	Hometown	Previous team	NHL rights
2	(United States)	Will Cullen	Sophomore	D	6' 0" (1.83 m)	184 lb (83 kg)	1996-07-24	Pelham Manor, New York	Carleton Place Canadians (CCHL)	—
3	(United States)	Carson Musser	Junior	D	6' 1" (1.85 m)	191 lb (87 kg)	1997-04-21	Grand Rapids, Michigan	Fargo Force (USHL)	—
4	(United States)	Garrett Daly	Freshman	D	6' 0" (1.83 m)	195 lb (88 kg)	1999-08-11	Lakeville, Minnesota	Langley Rivermen (BCHL)	—
5	(United States)	Cam Babiak	Freshman	D	6' 0" (1.83 m)	190 lb (86 kg)	1999-04-30	Saline, Michigan	Brookings Blizzard (NAHL)	—
6	(United States)	Alex Barber	Sophomore	F	5' 10" (1.78 m)	150 lb (68 kg)	1999-02-17	Dublin, Ohio	Central Illinois Flying Aces (USHL)	—
7	(Canada)	T. J. Lloyd	Freshman	D	5' 9" (1.75 m)	172 lb (78 kg)	1999-11-15	Lloydminster, Saskatchewan	Spruce Grove Saints (AJHL)	—
8	(Canada)	Frédéric Létourneau	Senior	F	5' 11" (1.8 m)	184 lb (83 kg)	1996-04-19	Montreal, Quebec	Whitecourt Wolverines (AJHL)	—
10	(United States)	Max Johnson	Junior	F	5' 10" (1.78 m)	192 lb (87 kg)	1998-05-12	Lakeville, Minnesota	Sioux Falls Stampede (USHL)	—
11	(United States)	Taylor Schneider	Sophomore	F	6' 1" (1.85 m)	161 lb (73 kg)	1998-02-18	Lakeville, Minnesota	Dubuque Fighting Saints (USHL)	—
12	(Canada)	Gavin Gould	Senior	F	5' 8" (1.73 m)	155 lb (70 kg)	1996-04-27	North Vancouver, British Columbia	Michigan Tech Huskies (WCHA)	—
13	(United States)	Adam Conquest	Freshman	F	6' 0" (1.83 m)	190 lb (86 kg)	2000-05-10	Brighton, Michigan	Cowichan Valley Capitals (BCHL)	—
14	(United States)	Justin Wells	Junior	D	6' 4" (1.93 m)	200 lb (91 kg)	1998-07-31	North Canton, Ohio	Sioux Falls Stampede (USHL)	—
15	(United States)	Evan Dougherty	Sophomore	F	6' 0" (1.83 m)	182 lb (83 kg)	1999-04-17	Kalamazoo, Michigan	Waterloo Black Hawks (USHL)	—
16	(Canada)	Cameron Wright	Junior	F	6' 1" (1.85 m)	189 lb (86 kg)	1998-08-11	Newmarket, Ontario	St. Michael's Buzzers (OJHL)	—
17	(United States)	Casey Linkenheld	Senior	F	6' 0" (1.83 m)	190 lb (86 kg)	1995-05-19	Bartlett, Illinois	Johnstown Tomahawks (NAHL)	—
18	(United States)	Trevor St-Jean	Sophomore	F	5' 8" (1.73 m)	173 lb (78 kg)	1997-10-10	Findlay, Ohio	Langley Rivermen (BCHL)	—
20	(United States)	Connor Ford	Junior	F	6' 0" (1.83 m)	187 lb (85 kg)	1998-02-05	Pittsburgh, Pennsylvania	Sioux City Musketeers (USHL)	—
21	(United States)	Jacob Dalton	Senior	D	6' 1" (1.85 m)	182 lb (83 kg)	1997-07-05	Saginaw, Michigan	Wichita Falls Wildcats (NAHL)	—
22	(United States)	Adam Pitters	Freshman	F	5' 11" (1.8 m)	180 lb (82 kg)	1999-02-09	Grosse Pointe, Michigan	Aberdeen Wings (NAHL)	—
23	(United States)	Alec Rauhauser	Senior	D	6' 3" (1.91 m)	223 lb (101 kg)	1995-03-17	Bismarck, North Dakota	Des Moines Buccaneers (USHL)	—
25	(United States)	Sam Craggs	Junior	F	6' 1" (1.85 m)	200 lb (91 kg)	1997-05-30	Elmhurst, Illinois	Waterloo Black Hawks (USHL)	—
27	(Canada)	Tim Theocharidis	Sophomore	D	6' 1" (1.85 m)	183 lb (83 kg)	1998-06-28	Scarborough, Ontario	Carleton Place Canadians (CCHL)	—
28	(United States)	Brandon Kruse	Junior	F	5' 9" (1.75 m)	155 lb (70 kg)	1999-02-26	Saline, Michigan	Brookings Blizzard (NAHL)	VGK, 135th overall 2018
29	(United States)	Chase Danol	Freshman	F	6' 1" (1.85 m)	195 lb (88 kg)	1999-01-20	Westland, Michigan	Coquitlam Express (BCHL)	—
31	(United States)	Eric Dop	Junior	G	5' 10" (1.78 m)	159 lb (72 kg)	1998-08-23	Lewis Center, Ohio	Tri-City Storm (USHL)	—
32	(United States)	Brett Rich	Junior	G	6' 3" (1.91 m)	183 lb (83 kg)	1999-01-09	Bowling Green, Ohio	Bowling Green High School (USHS–OH)	—
40	(Canada)	Zack Rose	Freshman	G	6' 1" (1.85 m)	185 lb (84 kg)	1999-07-03	Paradise, Newfoundland	Victoria Grizzlies (BCHL)	—

== Standings ==
2019–20 Western Collegiate Hockey Association Standings
	Conference record								Overall record					
	GP	W	L	T	3/SW	PTS	GF	GA	GP	W	L	T	GF	GA
#2 Minnesota State	28	23	4	1	1	71	115	38	36	29	5	2	141	53
#11 Bemidji State	28	20	5	3	2	65	101	46	34	20	9	5	111	65
Northern Michigan	28	16	11	1	1	50	92	87	36	18	14	4	115	112
Alaska	28	14	9	5	2	49	73	65	34	16	13	5	84	86
Bowling Green	28	14	10	4	3	49	85	70	36	19	13	4	112	92
Michigan Tech	28	14	12	2	0	44	68	65	37	19	15	3	96	85
Lake Superior State	28	11	13	4	4	41	66	77	38	13	21	4	90	112
Alaska Anchorage	28	4	18	6	3	21	56	96	34	4	23	7	66	122
Ferris State	28	5	21	2	0	17	54	100	35	7	26	2	70	127
Alabama–Huntsville	28	2	20	6	1	13	50	116	34	2	26	6	57	145
Championship: March 21, 2020 † indicates conference regular season champion; * indicates conference tournament champion Rankings: USCHO.com Top 20 Poll; updated March 1, 2020

== Schedule and results ==
Date	Time	Opponent^{#}	Rank^{#}	Site	TV	Decision	Result	Attendance	Record
Regular season
October 6	5:00 PM	at Miami*	#17	Steve Cady Arena • Oxford, Ohio		Dop	W 7–4	2,507	1–0–0
IceBreaker Invitational
October 11	9:10 PM	vs. RIT*	#17	Huntington Center • Toledo, Ohio (IceBreaker Semifinal)		Dop	L 2–3 ^{OT}	-	1–1–0
October 12	8:00 PM	vs. #14 Western Michigan*	#17	Huntington Center • Toledo, Ohio (IceBreaker Third Place)		Dop	L 2–5	-	1–2–0
October 18	7:07 PM	vs. #14 Western Michigan*		Slater Family Ice Arena • Bowling Green, Ohio		Dop	W 2–1	2,328	2–2–0
October 19	7:05 PM	at #14 Western Michigan*		Lawson Arena • Kalamazoo, Michigan		Dop	W 2–1 ^{OT}	2,385	3–2–0
October 25	7:07 PM	vs. Michigan Tech	#17	Slater Family Ice Arena • Bowling Green, Ohio	FloHockey.tv	Dop	W 3–1	2,250	4–2–0 (1–0–0–0)
October 26	7:07 PM	vs. Michigan Tech	#17	Slater Family Ice Arena • Bowling Green, Ohio	FloHockey.tv	Rose	L 2–4	1,748	4–3–0 (1–1–0–0)
November 1	8:07 PM	at #2 Minnesota State	#18	Mankato Civic Center • Mankato, Minnesota	FloHockey.tv	Dop	W 3–2 ^{OT}	4,114	5–3–0 (2–1–0–0)
November 2	7:07 PM	at #2 Minnesota State	#18	Mankato Civic Center • Mankato, Minnesota	FloHockey.tv	Dop	L 1–5	5,127	5–4–0 (2–2–0–0)
November 15	11:07 PM	at Alaska Anchorage	#17	Wells Fargo Sports Complex • Anchorage, Alaska	FloHockey.tv	Dop	W 3–1	725	6–4–0 (3–2–0–0)
November 16	9:07 PM	at Alaska Anchorage	#17	Wells Fargo Sports Complex • Anchorage, Alaska	FloHockey.tv	Dop	W 3–0	712	7–4–0 (4–2–0–0)
November 22	7:07 PM	vs. Lake Superior State	#17	Slater Family Ice Arena • Bowling Green, Ohio	FloHockey.tv	Dop	W 5–0	2,381	8–4–0 (5–2–0–0)
November 23	7:07 PM	vs. Lake Superior State	#17	Slater Family Ice Arena • Bowling Green, Ohio	FloHockey.tv	Dop	L 1–3	2,746	8–5–0 (5–3–0–0)
November 29	7:05 PM	at #5 Notre Dame*	#16	Compton Family Ice Arena • Notre Dame, Indiana	NBC Chicago+	Dop	W 5–2	5,271	9–5–0 (5–3–0–0)
November 30	7:07 PM	at #5 Notre Dame*	#16	Compton Family Ice Arena • Notre Dame, Indiana		Dop	W 5–2	3,382	10–5–0 (5–3–0–0)
December 6	7:07 PM	vs. Alabama–Huntsville	#13	Slater Family Ice Arena • Bowling Green, Ohio	FloHockey.tv	Dop	W 9–3	2,657	11–5–0 (6–3–0–0)
December 7	7:07 PM	vs. Alabama–Huntsville	#13	Slater Family Ice Arena • Bowling Green, Ohio	FloHockey.tv	Rose	T 2–2 ^{3x3 OTW}	2,279	11–5–1 (6–3–1–1)
December 13	7:07 PM	at Lake Superior State	#10	Taffy Abel Arena • Sault Ste. Marie, Michigan	FloHockey.tv	Dop	W 2–0	1,381	12–5–1 (7–3–1–1)
December 14	7:07 PM	at Lake Superior State	#10	Taffy Abel Arena • Sault Ste. Marie, Michigan	FloHockey.tv	Dop	L 2–3 ^{OT}	1,463	12–6–1 (7–4–1–1)
December 30	7:37 PM	vs. Miami*	#11	Slater Family Ice Arena • Bowling Green, Ohio		Dop	L 2–4	3,263	12–7–1 (7–4–1–1)
January 3	7:07 PM	vs. Northern Michigan	#11	Slater Family Ice Arena • Bowling Green, Ohio	FloHockey.tv	Dop	L 2–5	1,912	12–8–1 (7–5–1–1)
January 4	7:07 PM	vs. Northern Michigan	#11	Slater Family Ice Arena • Bowling Green, Ohio	FloHockey.tv	Dop	L 3–4 ^{OT}	2,113	12–9–1 (7–6–1–1)
January 10	7:37 PM	at #17 Michigan Tech	#16	MacInnes Student Ice Arena • Houghton, Michigan	FloHockey.tv	Dop	W 3–2	2,413	13–9–1 (8–6–1–1)
January 11	6:07 PM	at #17 Michigan Tech	#16	MacInnes Student Ice Arena • Houghton, Michigan	FloHockey.tv	Dop	T 2–2 ^{3x3 OTW}	2,702	13–9–2 (8–6–2–2)
January 17	7:07 PM	vs. #3 Minnesota State	#15	Slater Family Ice Arena • Bowling Green, Ohio	FloHockey.tv	Dop	L 3–6	2,042	13–10–2 (8–7–2–2)
January 18	7:07 PM	vs. #3 Minnesota State	#15	Slater Family Ice Arena • Bowling Green, Ohio	FloHockey.tv	Dop	L 2–3 ^{OT}	2,289	13–11–2 (8–8–2–2)
January 31	8:07 PM	at #19 Bemidji State		Sanford Center • Bemidji, Minnesota	FloHockey.tv	Dop	L 1–4	2,710	13–12–2 (8–9–2–2)
February 1	7:07 PM	at #19 Bemidji State		Sanford Center • Bemidji, Minnesota	FloHockey.tv	Dop	L 2–4	3,109	13–13–2 (8–10–2–2)
February 7	7:07 PM	vs. Alaska Anchorage		Slater Family Ice Arena • Bowling Green, Ohio	FloHockey.tv	Dop	W 5–4 ^{OT}	2,450	14–13–2 (9–10–2–2)
February 8	7:07 PM	vs. Alaska Anchorage		Slater Family Ice Arena • Bowling Green, Ohio	FloHockey.tv	Rose	W 4–1	3,515	15–13–2 (10–10–2–2)
February 14	11:07 PM	at Alaska		Carlson Center • Fairbanks, Alaska	FloHockey.tv	Dop	T 2–2 ^{3x3 OTL}	1,234	15–13–3 (10–10–3–2)
February 15	11:07 PM	at Alaska		Carlson Center • Fairbanks, Alaska	FloHockey.tv	Dop	T 3–3 ^{SOW}	1,805	15–13–4 (10–10–4–3)
February 21	7:07 PM	vs. Ferris State		Slater Family Ice Arena • Bowling Green, Ohio	FloHockey.tv	Dop	W 6–1	2,509	16–13–4 (11–10–4–3)
February 22	7:07 PM	vs. Ferris State		Slater Family Ice Arena • Bowling Green, Ohio	FloHockey.tv	Dop	W 3–1	4,350	17–13–4 (12–10–4–3)
February 28	8:07 PM	at Alabama–Huntsville		Von Braun Center • Huntsville, Alabama	FloHockey.tv	Dop	W 4–3 ^{OT}	1,193	18–13–4 (13–10–4–3)
February 29	4:07 PM	at Alabama–Huntsville		Von Braun Center • Huntsville, Alabama	FloHockey.tv	Dop	W 4–1	876	19–13–4 (14–10–4–3)
WCHA Tournament
March 6	11:07 PM	at Alaska*		Carlson Center • Fairbanks, Alaska (WCHA Quarterfinals Game 1)		Dop	W 4–2	1,535	20–13–4 (14–10–4–3)
March 7	11:07 PM	at Alaska*		Carlson Center • Fairbanks, Alaska (WCHA Quarterfinals Game 2)		Dop	W 3–2	1,682	21–13–4 (14–10–4–3)
Bowling Green Won Series 2–0
Remainder of Tournament Cancelled
*Non-conference game. ^{#}Rankings from USCHO.com Poll. All times are in Eastern Time.

== Scoring Statistics ==
Name	Position	Games	Goals	Assists	Points	PIM
Alec Rauhauser	D	38	11	24	35	40
Connor Ford	RW	36	12	22	34	16
Brandon Kruse	LW	38	9	25	34	24
Cameron Wright	LW	38	20	7	27	22
Alex Barber	F	38	11	16	27	26
Max Johnson	C	34	6	19	25	8
Taylor Schneider	LW	38	8	13	21	20
Frédéric Létourneau	F	35	6	15	21	12
Will Cullen	D	37	7	9	16	53
Sam Craggs	LW	38	6	8	14	71
Tim Theocharidis	D	38	3	10	13	35
T. J. Lloyd	D	38	3	8	11	12
Casey Linkenheld	LW	38	5	5	10	4
Adam Conquest	RW	23	4	2	6	4
Evan Dougherty	RW	33	4	2	6	45
Adam Pitters	F	34	1	5	6	28
Jacob Dalton	D	26	1	4	5	12
Carson Musser	D	34	1	4	5	10
Justin Wells	D	38	1	4	5	10
Zack Rose	G	5	0	1	1	0
Garrett Daly	D	25	0	1	1	14
Eric Dop	G	33	0	1	1	0
Chase Danol	F	9	0	0	0	2
Trevor St. Jean	F	16	0	0	0	2
Bench	-	-	-	-	-	8
Total			119	205	324	478

== Goaltending statistics ==
Name	Games	Minutes	Wins	Losses	Ties	Goals against	Saves	Shut outs	SV %	GAA
Zack Rose	5	300	2	2	1	11	105	0	.905	2.20
Eric Dop	33	2004	19	11	3	79	730	3	.902	2.36
Empty Net	-	12	-	-	-	6	-	-	-	-
Total	38	1317	21	13	4	96	835	3	.897	2.49

== Rankings ==
Poll	Week																							
Poll	Pre	1	2	3	4	5	6	7	8	9	10	11	12	13	14	15	16	17	18	19	20	21	22	23 (Final)
USCHO.com	17	17	NR	17	18	17	17	17	16	13	10	11	11	16	15	17	NR	NR	NR	NR	NR	NR	NR	NR
USA Today	NR	NR	NR	NR	NR	NR	NR	15	15	11	10	10	10	15	15	NR	NR	NR	NR	NR	NR	NR	NR	NR
