= 2020 WCHA men's ice hockey tournament =

2020 WCHA Men's ice hockey tournament
- Dates: March 6–21, 2020
- Teams: 8
- WCHA Men's Ice Hockey Tournaments

The 2020 WCHA Men's Ice Hockey Tournament was the 61st conference playoff in league history and was to be the 66th season where a WCHA champion was crowned. The 2020 tournament was to be played between March 6 and March 21, 2020, at campus sites. On March 12, 2020, the WCHA announced the remainder of the tournament was cancelled due to the COVID-19 pandemic in the United States.

== Format ==
The first two rounds of the postseason tournament featured a best-of-three games format. The top eight conference teams participated in the tournament. Teams were seeded No. 1 through No. 8 according to their final conference standings, with a tiebreaker system used to seed teams with an identical number of points accumulated. The higher seeded teams each earned home ice and host one of the lower seeded teams.

The final would have been a single game held at the campus site of the highest remaining seed.

== Conference standings ==
2019–20 Western Collegiate Hockey Association Standings
	Conference record								Overall record					
	GP	W	L	T	3/SW	PTS	GF	GA	GP	W	L	T	GF	GA
#2 Minnesota State	28	23	4	1	1	71	115	38	36	29	5	2	141	53
#11 Bemidji State	28	20	5	3	2	65	101	46	34	20	9	5	111	65
Northern Michigan	28	16	11	1	1	50	92	87	36	18	14	4	115	112
Alaska	28	14	9	5	2	49	73	65	34	16	13	5	84	86
Bowling Green	28	14	10	4	3	49	85	70	36	19	13	4	112	92
Michigan Tech	28	14	12	2	0	44	68	65	37	19	15	3	96	85
Lake Superior State	28	11	13	4	4	41	66	77	38	13	21	4	90	112
Alaska Anchorage	28	4	18	6	3	21	56	96	34	4	23	7	66	122
Ferris State	28	5	21	2	0	17	54	100	35	7	26	2	70	127
Alabama–Huntsville	28	2	20	6	1	13	50	116	34	2	26	6	57	145
Championship: March 21, 2020 † indicates conference regular season champion; * indicates conference tournament champion Rankings: USCHO.com Top 20 Poll; updated March 1, 2020

== Bracket ==
Quarterfinals; March 6–8
1	Minnesota State	8	4	—
8	Alaska Anchorage	1	2	—
4	Alaska	2	2	—
5	Bowling Green	4	3	—
3	Northern Michigan	1	3	—
6	Michigan Tech	4	4***	—
2	Bemidji State	2	3	3
7	Lake Superior State	0	5	1

Semifinals; March 13–15
1	Minnesota State
6	Michigan Tech
2	Bemidji State
5	Bowling Green

Championship; March 21

Note: * denotes overtime periods
