= Berry Events Center =

Multi-purpose arena in Marquette, Michigan, U.S.

- The Berry
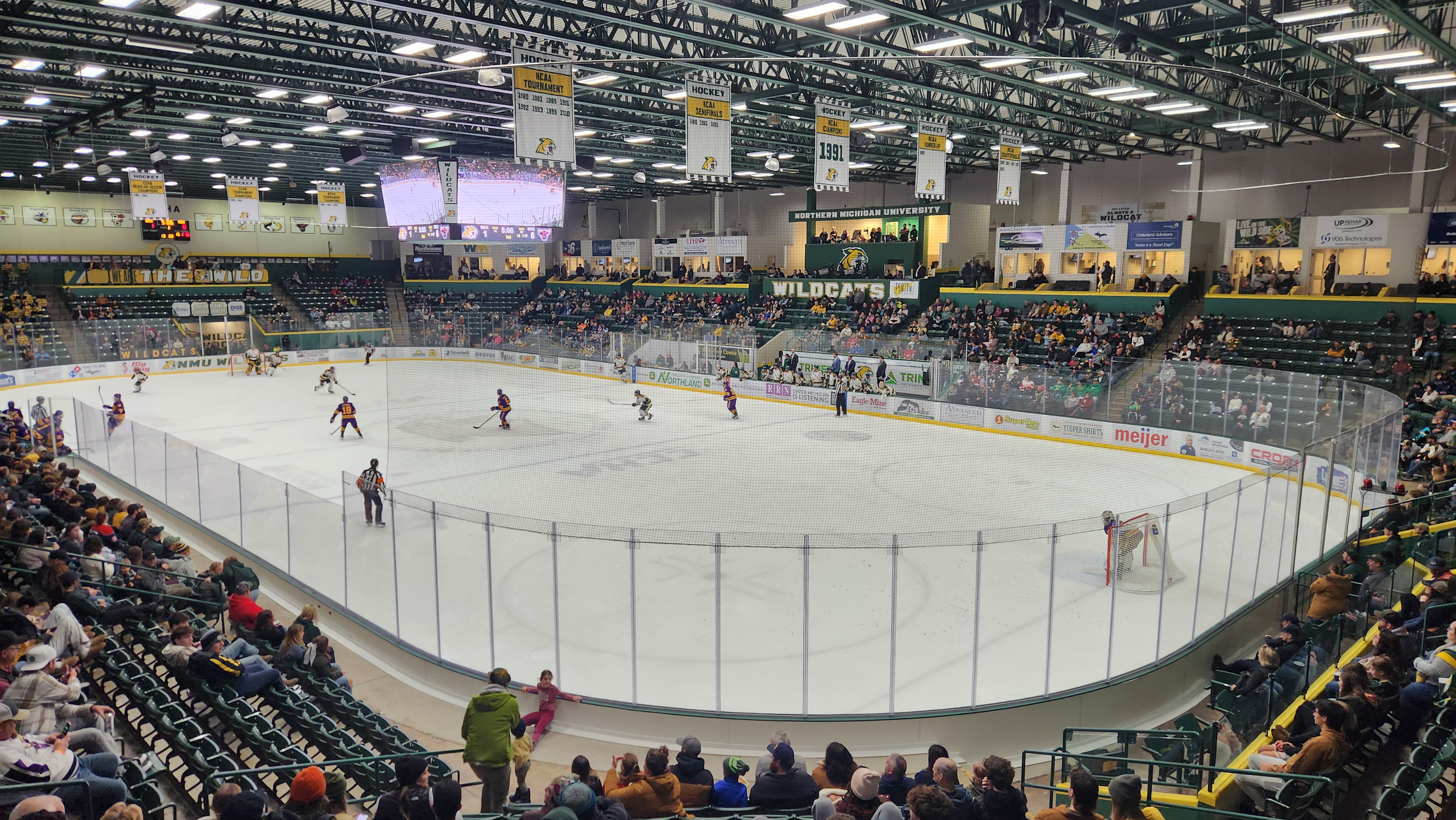
- Interactive map of Berry Events Center
- Location: Marquette, Michigan
- Coordinates: 46°33′28″N 87°23′34″W
- Owner: Northern Michigan University
- Operator: Northern Michigan University
- Capacity: 3,802 (ice hockey); 4,300 (basketball)
- Surface: 200 by 94 feet (61 m × 29 m) (ice hockey)

Construction
- Opened: October 1, 1999
- Cost: $11 million (approximate)

Tenants
- Northern Michigan Wildcats (Hockey)

Berry Events Center is a 4,300-seat multi-purpose arena in Marquette, Michigan, in the United States that opened in 1999. It is home to the Northern Michigan University Wildcats ice hockey team. The arena formerly housed the US short track speed skating team and basketball team. It was built in 1999, and is named for John W. Berry, Jr., class of 1971, a primary benefactor of the facility. The arena replaced Lakeview Arena, the home of Wildcat hockey for its first twenty-three seasons.

The arena contains 16 luxury suites and standing room for 400 fans. It is also the premier sports and entertainment venue in the Upper Peninsula, accommodating up to 5,675 for concerts.

It was formerly the only school in the Central Collegiate Hockey Association to have Olympic-size ice (200 by 100 feet or 61 by 30 metres), before a multi-million dollar ice making plant upgrade in 2023 that included shrinking the dimensions of the rink to a hybrid 200 x 94 ft rink.
