= 2019–20 Alabama–Huntsville Chargers men's ice hockey season =

- Conference: 10th WCHA
- Home ice: Von Braun Center

Rankings
- USCHO: NR
- USA Today: NR

Record
- Overall: 2–26–6
- Conference: 2–20–6–1
- Home: 2–10–2
- Road: 0–16–4
- Neutral: 0–0–0

Coaches and captains
- Head coach: Mike Corbett
- Assistant coaches: Gavin Morgan; Lance West; Cliff Rogers

The 2019-20 Alabama–Huntsville Chargers men's ice hockey season was the 35th season of play for the program, the 27th at the Division I level and the 7th in the WCHA conference. The Chargers represented the University of Alabama Huntsville and were coached by Mike Corbett, in his 7th season.

After the season, financial constraints due in part to the coronavirus pandemic caused UAH to suspend its ice hockey program as well as both men's and women's tennis. On May 25, 2020, the university announced the program would be reinstated if the community could raise $750,000 by Friday, May 29. Pledges from alumni reduced the amount needed from the general public to $500,000. On May 29, fundraising efforts surpassed $500,000, and shortly afterwards the university confirmed the program would be restored for the 2020-2021 season.

== Departures ==
Player	Position	Nationality	Cause
Andrew Dodson	Forward	Canada	Transferred to Guelph
Madison Dunn	Forward	Canada	Graduation (retired)
Hans Gorowsky	Forward	United States	Graduation (signed with Adirondack Thunder)
Kurt Gosselin	Defenseman	United States	Graduation (signed with Cincinnati Cyclones)
Cam Knight	Defenseman	United States	Graduation (signed with Fort Wayne Komets)
Jesper Ohrvall	Forward	Sweden	Graduation (retired)
John Teets	Defenseman	United States	Graduation (signed with Tulsa Oilers)
Jake Theut	Goaltender	United States	Graduation (signed with Roanoke Rail Yard Dawgs)
Adam Wilcox	Forward	United States	Graduation (retired)
Levi Wunder	Forward	United States	Transferred to Geneseo State

== Recruiting ==
Player	Position	Nationality	Age	Notes
Lucas Bahn	Defenseman	United States	20	Hendersonville, TN
Max Coyle	Defenseman	Canada	21	Tillsonburg, ON
Adrian Danchenko	Forward	United States	20	Palm City, FL
David Fessenden	Goaltender	United States	21	Parker, CO
Peyton Francis	Forward	Canada	20	Oakville, ON
Tanner Hickey	Defenseman	Canada	20	Leduc, AB
Liam Izyk	Forward	Canada	20	Blackie, AB
Daneel Lategan	Forward	Canada	21	Cape Town, RSA
Josh Latta	Forward	Canada	21	West Vancouver, BC

== Roster ==
As of August 1, 2019.

No.	Nat.	Player	Class	Pos	Height	Weight	DoB	Hometown	Previous team	NHL rights
2		Lucas Bahn	Freshman	D	5' 11" (1.8 m)	175 lb (79 kg)	1999-09-11	Hendersonville, Tennessee	West Kelowna Warriors (BCHL)	—
3		Drew Lennon	Sophomore	D	6' 2" (1.88 m)	185 lb (84 kg)	1998-01-12	Bloomington, Illinois	Lone Star Brahmas (NAHL)	—
4		Connor James	Senior	D	5' 9" (1.75 m)	170 lb (77 kg)	1996-10-11	Wainwright, Alberta	Spruce Grove Saints (AJHL)	—
5		Simon Chen	Sophomore	D	5' 10" (1.78 m)	180 lb (82 kg)	1997-06-26	Beijing, China	Cowichan Valley Capitals (BCHL)	—
6		Sean Rappleyea	Senior	D	5' 11" (1.8 m)	175 lb (79 kg)	1995-02-03	Sayreville, New Jersey	Ottawa Jr. Senators (CCHL)	—
7		Bauer Neudecker	Sophomore	F	5' 8" (1.73 m)	165 lb (75 kg)	1998-06-01	St. Louis Park, Minnesota	Sioux City Musketeers (USHL)	—
8		Josh Latta	Freshman	F	5' 11" (1.8 m)	180 lb (82 kg)	1998-08-14	West Vancouver, British Columbia	Vernon Vipers (BCHL)	—
9		Christian Rajic	Junior	F	5' 10" (1.78 m)	165 lb (75 kg)	1997-02-06	Oakville, Ontario	Oakville Blades (OJHL)	—
10		Tanner Hickey	Freshman	D	5' 10" (1.78 m)	175 lb (79 kg)	1999-04-30	Leduc, Alberta	Spruce Grove Saints (AJHL)	—
11		Peyton Francis	Freshman	F	6' 1" (1.85 m)	175 lb (79 kg)	1999-04-12	Oakville, Ontario	Carleton Place Canadians (CCHL)	—
12		Connor Merkley	Junior	F	6' 1" (1.85 m)	190 lb (86 kg)	1996-09-03	Portland, Ontario	Carleton Place Canadians (CCHL)	—
13		Ben Allen	Sophomore	F	5' 9" (1.75 m)	175 lb (79 kg)	1997-07-31	Allen, Texas	Melfort Mustangs (SJHL)	—
14		Daneel Lategan	Freshman	F	6' 1" (1.85 m)	180 lb (82 kg)	1998-02-27	Westlake, Alberta	Langley Rivermen (BCHL)	—
15		Max Coyle	Freshman	D	6' 0" (1.83 m)	185 lb (84 kg)	1998-01-29	Tillsonburg, Ontario	Prince George Spruce Kings (BCHL)	—
16		Connor Wood	Junior	F	5' 8" (1.73 m)	180 lb (82 kg)	1996-08-09	Buford, Georgia	Odessa Jackalopes (NAHL)	—
18		Austin Beaulieu	Senior	F	5' 9" (1.75 m)	170 lb (77 kg)	1996-10-21	Coral Springs, Florida	Wichita Falls Wildcats (CCHL)	—
19		Brandon Salerno	Senior	F	5' 8" (1.73 m)	155 lb (70 kg)	1995-07-31	Toronto, Ontario	Pickering Panthers (OJHL)	—
20		Bailey Newton	Sophomore	D	5' 10" (1.78 m)	180 lb (82 kg)	1998-05-14	Oakville, Ontario	Oakville Blades (OJHL)	—
21		Liam Izyk	Freshman	F	6' 1" (1.85 m)	180 lb (82 kg)	1998-12-27	Blackie, Alberta	Fort McMurray Oil Barons (AJHL)	—
22		Dayne Finnson	Sophomore	D	5' 10" (1.78 m)	175 lb (79 kg)	1997-10-01	Arborg, Manitoba	Victoria Grizzlies (BCHL)	—
23		Jay Powell	Sophomore	D	6' 7" (2.01 m)	200 lb (91 kg)	1997-10-01	Nashville, Tennessee	Minnesota Wilderness (NAHL)	—
24		Tyr Thompson	Sophomore	F	6' 0" (1.83 m)	180 lb (82 kg)	1998-09-26	Sherwood Park, Alberta	Whitecourt Wolverines (AJHL)	—
26		Jack Jeffers	Sophomore	F	6' 0" (1.83 m)	170 lb (77 kg)	1997-09-21	Oakville, Ontario	Markham Royals (OJHL)	—
27		Teddy Rotenberger	Junior	D	5' 11" (1.8 m)	180 lb (82 kg)	1996-01-01	Huntsville, Alabama	Shreveport Mudbugs (NAHL)	—
30		Mark Sinclair	Junior	G	5' 11" (1.8 m)	170 lb (77 kg)	1996-03-08	Dundas, Ontario	Chilliwack Chiefs (BCHL)	—
33		Adrian Danchenko	Freshman	F	6' 2" (1.88 m)	185 lb (84 kg)	1999-03-29	Palm City, Florida	Wilkes-Barre/Scranton Knights (NAHL)	—
35		Josh Astorino	Junior	G	6' 2" (1.88 m)	185 lb (84 kg)	1996-12-09	Niagara Falls, Ontario	Georgetown Raiders (OJHL)	—
41		David Fessenden	Freshman	G	6' 6" (1.98 m)	230 lb (104 kg)	1998-04-30	Parker, Colorado	Northeast Generals (NAHL)	—

== Standings ==
2019–20 Western Collegiate Hockey Association Standings
	Conference record								Overall record					
	GP	W	L	T	3/SW	PTS	GF	GA	GP	W	L	T	GF	GA
#2 Minnesota State	28	23	4	1	1	71	115	38	36	29	5	2	141	53
#11 Bemidji State	28	20	5	3	2	65	101	46	34	20	9	5	111	65
Northern Michigan	28	16	11	1	1	50	92	87	36	18	14	4	115	112
Alaska	28	14	9	5	2	49	73	65	34	16	13	5	84	86
Bowling Green	28	14	10	4	3	49	85	70	36	19	13	4	112	92
Michigan Tech	28	14	12	2	0	44	68	65	37	19	15	3	96	85
Lake Superior State	28	11	13	4	4	41	66	77	38	13	21	4	90	112
Alaska Anchorage	28	4	18	6	3	21	56	96	34	4	23	7	66	122
Ferris State	28	5	21	2	0	17	54	100	35	7	26	2	70	127
Alabama–Huntsville	28	2	20	6	1	13	50	116	34	2	26	6	57	145
Championship: March 21, 2020 † indicates conference regular season champion; * indicates conference tournament champion Rankings: USCHO.com Top 20 Poll; updated March 1, 2020

== Schedule and results ==
Date	Time	Opponent^{#}	Rank^{#}	Site	TV	Decision	Result	Attendance	Record
Regular season
October 5	5:00 PM	at Massachusetts–Lowell*		Tsongas Center • Lowell, Massachusetts		Sinclair	L 1–5	4,207	0–1–0
October 6	3:05 PM	at Massachusetts–Lowell*		Tsongas Center • Lowell, Massachusetts		Fessenden	L 1–3	1,502	0–2–0
October 11	7:07 PM	at Omaha*		Baxter Arena • Omaha, Nebraska		Sinclair	L 1–6	5,150	0–3–0
October 12	7:07 PM	at Omaha*		Baxter Arena • Omaha, Nebraska		Fessenden	L 0–5	4,525	0–4–0
October 25	7:07 PM	vs. #2 Minnesota State		Von Braun Center • Huntsville, Alabama	FloHockey.tv	Sinclair	L 1–5	1,842	0–5–0 (0–1–0–0)
October 26	7:07 PM	vs. #2 Minnesota State		Von Braun Center • Huntsville, Alabama	FloHockey.tv	Sinclair	L 1–4	3,084	0–6–0 (0–2–0–0)
November 1	6:07 PM	at #20 Northern Michigan		Berry Events Center • Marquette, Michigan	FloHockey.tv	Sinclair	L 3–5	2,493	0–7–0 (0–3–0–0)
November 2	5:07 PM	at #20 Northern Michigan		Berry Events Center • Marquette, Michigan	FloHockey.tv	Sinclair	L 2–4	2,959	0–8–0 (0–4–0–0)
November 8	7:07 PM	vs. Alaska Anchorage		Von Braun Center • Huntsville, Alabama	FloHockey.tv	Sinclair	T 4–4 ^{OT}	1,217	0–8–1 (0–4–1–0)
November 9	7:07 PM	vs. Alaska Anchorage		Von Braun Center • Huntsville, Alabama	FloHockey.tv	Fessenden	L 1–3	1,187	0–9–1 (0–5–1–0)
November 22	7:07 PM	at Bemidji State		Sanford Center • Bemidji, Minnesota	FloHockey.tv	Fessenden	L 3–5	3,007	0–10–1 (0–6–1–0)
November 23	6:07 PM	at Bemidji State		Sanford Center • Bemidji, Minnesota	FloHockey.tv	Fessenden	L 0–7	3,112	0–11–1 (0–7–1–0)
November 29	7:07 PM	vs. Northern Michigan		Von Braun Center • Huntsville, Alabama	FloHockey.tv	Sinclair	W 4–2	1,142	1–11–1 (1–7–1–0)
November 30	7:07 PM	vs. Northern Michigan		Von Braun Center • Huntsville, Alabama	FloHockey.tv	Sinclair	L 1–3	956	1–12–1 (1–8–1–0)
December 6	6:07 PM	at #13 Bowling Green		Slater Family Ice Arena • Bowling Green, Ohio	FloHockey.tv	Sinclair	L 3–9	2,657	1–13–1 (1–9–1–0)
December 7	3:07 PM	at #13 Bowling Green		Slater Family Ice Arena • Bowling Green, Ohio	FloHockey.tv	Sinclair	T 2–2 ^{3x3 OTL}	2,259	1–13–2 (1–9–2–0)
December 13	6:07 PM	at Ferris State		Ewigleben Arena • Big Rapids, Michigan	FloHockey.tv	Sinclair	T 2–2 ^{3x3 OTW}	920	1–13–3 (1–9–3–1)
December 14	6:07 PM	at Ferris State		Ewigleben Arena • Big Rapids, Michigan	FloHockey.tv	Sinclair	L 1–3	1,030	1–14–3 (1–10–3–1)
January 3	7:37 PM	at #1 North Dakota*		Ralph Engelstad Arena • Grand Forks, North Dakota		Sinclair	L 2–5	11,214	1–15–3 (1–10–3–1)
January 4	7:07 PM	at #1 North Dakota*		Ralph Engelstad Arena • Grand Forks, North Dakota		Sinclair	L 2–5	11,760	1–16–3 (1–10–3–1)
January 9	7:37 PM	vs. Bemidji State		Von Braun Center • Huntsville, Alabama	FloHockey.tv	Sinclair	L 1–3	949	1–17–3 (1–11–3–1)
January 10	7:37 PM	vs. Bemidji State		Von Braun Center • Huntsville, Alabama	FloHockey.tv	Sinclair	L 3–4	1,207	1–18–3 (1–12–3–1)
January 17	10:07 PM	at Alaska Anchorage		Wells Fargo Sports Complex • Anchorage, Alaska	FloHockey.tv	Sinclair	L 1–5	650	1–19–3 (1–13–3–1)
January 18	8:07 PM	at Alaska Anchorage		Wells Fargo Sports Complex • Anchorage, Alaska	FloHockey.tv	Sinclair	T 2–2 ^{3x3 OTL}	666	1–19–4 (1–13–4–1)
January 31	7:07 PM	vs. Michigan Tech		Von Braun Center • Huntsville, Alabama	FloHockey.tv	Sinclair	L 1–4	2,113	1–20–4 (1–14–4–1)
February 1	7:07 PM	vs. Michigan Tech		Von Braun Center • Huntsville, Alabama	FloHockey.tv	Sinclair	W 3–1	1,136	2–20–4 (2–14–4–1)
February 7	7:07 PM	vs. Alaska		Von Braun Center • Huntsville, Alabama	FloHockey.tv	Sinclair	T 6–6 ^{3x3 OTL}	1,405	2–20–5 (2–14–5–1)
February 8	7:07 PM	vs. Alaska		Von Braun Center • Huntsville, Alabama	FloHockey.tv	Sinclair	L 0–3	1,563	2–21–5 (2–15–5–1)
February 14	6:07 PM	at Lake Superior State		Taffy Abel Arena • Sault Ste. Marie, Michigan	FloHockey.tv	Sinclair	T 0–0 ^{SOL}	1,721	2–21–6 (2–15–6–1)
February 15	6:07 PM	at Lake Superior State		GFL Memorial Gardens • Sault Ste. Marie, Ontario	FloHockey.tv	Sinclair	L 1–4	3,169	2–22–6 (2–16–6–1)
February 21	7:07 PM	at #3 Minnesota State		Mankato Civic Center • Mankato, Minnesota	FloHockey.tv	Sinclair	L 0–10	4,584	2–23–6 (2–17–6–1)
February 22	6:07 PM	at #3 Minnesota State		Mankato Civic Center • Mankato, Minnesota	FloHockey.tv	Sinclair	L 0–8	5,131	2–24–6 (2–18–6–1)
February 28	7:07 PM	vs. Bowling Green		Von Braun Center • Huntsville, Alabama	FloHockey.tv	Sinclair	L 3–4 ^{OT}	1,193	2–25–6 (2–19–6–1)
February 29	3:07 PM	vs. Bowling Green		Von Braun Center • Huntsville, Alabama	FloHockey.tv	Sinclair	L 1–4	876	2–26–6 (2–20–6–1)
*Non-conference game. ^{#}Rankings from USCHO.com Poll. All times are in Central Time.

== Scoring Statistics ==
Name	Position	Games	Goals	Assists	Points	PIM
John Latta	F	32	7	11	18	16
Christian Rajic	C	34	6	9	15	6
Austin Beaulieu	RW	34	6	7	13	14
Jack Jeffers	F	33	6	6	12	37
Liam Izyk	F	32	3	8	11	12
Tanner Hickey	D	30	3	7	10	30
Daneel Lategan	F	30	5	4	9	18
Tyr Thompson	F	32	6	2	8	18
Connor Merkley	C	29	3	5	8	25
Connor Wood	RW	30	4	3	7	32
Dayne Finnson	D	32	1	6	7	21
Bauer Neudecker	F	31	0	6	6	10
Connor James	D	33	0	6	6	20
Brandon Salerno	C	32	3	2	5	2
Ben Allen	LW	16	1	3	4	4
Lucas Bahn	D	31	1	3	4	18
Max Coyle	D	34	0	4	4	42
Sean Rappleyea	D	9	1	1	2	0
Adrian Danchenko	F	16	1	1	2	8
Drew Lennon	D	22	0	2	2	10
Peyton Francis	C	29	0	2	2	2
Bailey Newton	D	33	0	2	2	32
David Fessenden	G	7	0	0	0	0
Teddy Rotenberger	D	12	0	0	0	7
Mark Sinclair	G	30	0	0	0	0
Total						

== Goaltending statistics ==
Name	Games	Minutes	Wins	Losses	Ties	Goals against	Saves	Shut outs	SV %	GAA
Mark Sinclair	30	1743	2	21	6	112	968	1	.896	3.86
David Fessenden	7	310	0	5	0	23	152	0	.869	4.44
Empty Net	-	18	-	-	-	10	-	-	-	-
Total	34	2072	2	26	6	145	1120	1	.885	4.20

== Rankings ==
Poll	Week																							
Poll	Pre	1	2	3	4	5	6	7	8	9	10	11	12	13	14	15	16	17	18	19	20	21	22	23 (Final)
USCHO.com	NR	NR	NR	NR	NR	NR	NR	NR	NR	NR	NR	NR	NR	NR	NR	NR	NR	NR	NR	NR	NR	NR	NR	NR
USA Today	NR	NR	NR	NR	NR	NR	NR	NR	NR	NR	NR	NR	NR	NR	NR	NR	NR	NR	NR	NR	NR	NR	NR	NR
