= 2019–20 Michigan Tech Huskies men's ice hockey season =

Great Lakes Invitational, Champion
- Conference: 6th WCHA
- Home ice: MacInnes Student Ice Arena

Rankings
- USCHO: NR
- USA Today: NR

Record
- Overall: 21–15–3
- Conference: 14–12–2–0
- Home: 5–9–2
- Road: 14–6–1
- Neutral: 2–0–0

Coaches and captains
- Head coach: Joe Shawhan
- Assistant coaches: Chris Brooks; Dallas Steward
- Captain: Raymond Brice
- Alternate captain(s): Alex Smith; Seamus Donohue

The 2019–20 Michigan Tech Huskies men's ice hockey season was the 99th season of play for the program and the 58th in the WCHA conference. The Huskies represented Michigan Technological University and were coached by Joe Shawhan, in his 3rd season.

The team's season ended abruptly when the WCHA announced that the remainder of the tournament was cancelled due to the COVID-19 pandemic in the United States on March 12, 2020.

== Roster ==
As of October 6, 2019.

No.	Nat.	Player	Class	Pos	Height	Weight	DoB	Hometown	Previous team	NHL rights
2	(United States)	Seamus Donohue (A)	Junior	D	6' 0" (1.83 m)	186 lb (84 kg)	1996-06-01	North Oaks, Minnesota	Wichita Falls (NAHL)	—
3	(Canada)	Tyrell Buckley	Sophomore	D	6' 0" (1.83 m)	195 lb (88 kg)	1997-03-01	Penticton, British Columbia	Merritt Centennials (BCHL)	—
4	(United States)	Chris Lipe	Freshman	D	6' 1" (1.85 m)	190 lb (86 kg)	1999-11-23	Rockford, Michigan	Dubuque Fighting Saints (USHL)	—
5	(United States)	Brenden Datema	Freshman	D	6' 5" (1.96 m)	220 lb (100 kg)	1999-03-18	Sterling Heights, Michigan	Amarillo Bulls (NAHL)	—
6	(United States)	Cooper Watson	Junior	D	6' 3" (1.91 m)	195 lb (88 kg)	1996-04-18	Appleton, Wisconsin	Vernon Vipers (BCHL)	—
7	(United States)	Keegan Ford	Senior (RS)	D	5' 9" (1.75 m)	176 lb (80 kg)	1996-05-30	Waunakee, Wisconsin	Madison Capitols (USHL)	—
8	(United States)	David Raisanen	Junior	F	6' 5" (1.96 m)	215 lb (98 kg)	1998-01-17	Cokato, Minnesota	Minot Minotauros (NAHL)	—
9	(United States)	Tommy Parrottino	Sophomore	F	5' 11" (1.8 m)	170 lb (77 kg)	1998-03-03	Rochester Hills, Michigan	Youngstown Phantoms (USHL)	—
10	(United States)	Jake Crespi	Freshman	F	6' 1" (1.85 m)	190 lb (86 kg)	1998-12-10	Brighton, Michigan	Tri-City Storm (USHL)	—
11	(United States)	Zach Noble	Sophomore	F	6' 2" (1.88 m)	185 lb (84 kg)	1998-09-19	Toms River, New Jersey	Aberdeen Wings (NAHL)	—
12	(United States)	Brian Halonen	Sophomore	F	6' 0" (1.83 m)	205 lb (93 kg)	1999-01-11	Delano, Minnesota	Des Moines Buccaneers (USHL)	—
13	(United States)	Logan Pietila	Freshman	F	5' 11" (1.8 m)	157 lb (71 kg)	2000-01-27	Howell, Michigan	Dubuque Fighting Saints (USHL)	—
14	(Canada)	Logan Ganie	Freshman	F	5' 10" (1.78 m)	178 lb (81 kg)	1999-06-28	Irma, Alberta	Spruce Grove Saints (AJHL)	—
15	(Canada)	Parker Saretsky	Freshman	F	6' 0" (1.83 m)	170 lb (77 kg)	1999-04-23	Wainwright, Alberta	Spruce Grove Saints (AJHL)	—
16	(United States)	T. J. Polglaze	Sophomore	F	5' 11" (1.8 m)	178 lb (81 kg)	1997-02-17	Beloit, Wisconsin	Janesville Jets (NAHL)	—
17	(United States)	Justin Misiak	Junior	F	5' 10" (1.78 m)	176 lb (80 kg)	1996-04-25	St. Clair Shores, Michigan	Austin Bruins (NAHL)	—
18	(Canada)	Greyson Reitmeier	Junior	F	6' 3" (1.91 m)	200 lb (91 kg)	1996-05-16	Nakusp, British Columbia	Flin Flon Bombers (SJHL)	—
19	(United States)	Eric Gotz	Sophomore	D	5' 10" (1.78 m)	178 lb (81 kg)	1998-04-23	Hermantown, Minnesota	Minnesota Wilderness (NAHL)	—
20	(Canada)	Alex Smith (A)	Senior	F	6' 0" (1.83 m)	188 lb (85 kg)	1995-07-10	Edmonton, Alberta	Flin Flon Bombers (SJHL)	—
21	(United States)	Todd Kiilunen	Junior (RS)	D	5' 11" (1.8 m)	189 lb (86 kg)	1998-08-12	Brighton, Michigan	Victory Honda (Midget AAA)	—
22	(United States)	Tyler Rockwell	Junior	D	5' 8" (1.73 m)	160 lb (73 kg)	1996-06-27	San Jose, California	Wenatchee Wild (BCHL)	—
23	(United States)	Raymond Brice (C)	Senior	F	6' 0" (1.83 m)	195 lb (88 kg)	1995-11-09	Houghton, Michigan	New Jersey Titans (NAHL)	—
24	(United States)	Colin Swoyer	Sophomore	D	6' 0" (1.83 m)	180 lb (82 kg)	1998-03-31	Hinsdale, Illinois	Sioux Falls Stampede (USHL)	—
26	(United States)	Marcus Russell	Junior	F	5' 9" (1.75 m)	175 lb (79 kg)	1996-03-06	Traverse City, Michigan	Sioux Falls Stampede (USHL)	—
27	(Canada)	Mitch Meek	Junior	D	6' 0" (1.83 m)	190 lb (86 kg)	1996-08-21	Victoria, British Columbia	Penticton Vees (BCHL)	—
28	(United States)	Trenton Bliss	Sophomore	F	6' 0" (1.83 m)	192 lb (87 kg)	1998-03-16	Appleton, Wisconsin	Green Bay Gamblers (USHL)	—
29	(United States)	Alec Broetzman	Sophomore	F	6' 0" (1.83 m)	200 lb (91 kg)	1997-02-05	Hudson, Wisconsin	Madison Capitols (USHL)	—
30	(United States)	Matt Jurusik	Senior	G	6' 2" (1.88 m)	195 lb (88 kg)	1997-05-01	La Grange, Illinois	Sioux City Musketeers (USHL)	—
31	(United States)	Blake Pietila	Freshman	G	5' 11" (1.8 m)	165 lb (75 kg)	2000-01-27	Howell, Michigan	Cedar Rapids RoughRiders (USHL)	—
35	(United States)	Robbie Beydoun	Junior	G	6' 0" (1.83 m)	185 lb (84 kg)	1996-10-01	Plymouth, Michigan	Waterloo Black Hawks (USHL)	—

== Standings ==
2019–20 Western Collegiate Hockey Association Standings
	Conference record								Overall record					
	GP	W	L	T	3/SW	PTS	GF	GA	GP	W	L	T	GF	GA
#2 Minnesota State	28	23	4	1	1	71	115	38	36	29	5	2	141	53
#11 Bemidji State	28	20	5	3	2	65	101	46	34	20	9	5	111	65
Northern Michigan	28	16	11	1	1	50	92	87	36	18	14	4	115	112
Alaska	28	14	9	5	2	49	73	65	34	16	13	5	84	86
Bowling Green	28	14	10	4	3	49	85	70	36	19	13	4	112	92
Michigan Tech	28	14	12	2	0	44	68	65	37	19	15	3	96	85
Lake Superior State	28	11	13	4	4	41	66	77	38	13	21	4	90	112
Alaska Anchorage	28	4	18	6	3	21	56	96	34	4	23	7	66	122
Ferris State	28	5	21	2	0	17	54	100	35	7	26	2	70	127
Alabama–Huntsville	28	2	20	6	1	13	50	116	34	2	26	6	57	145
Championship: March 21, 2020 † indicates conference regular season champion; * indicates conference tournament champion Rankings: USCHO.com Top 20 Poll; updated March 1, 2020

== Schedule and results ==
Date	Time	Opponent^{#}	Rank^{#}	Site	TV	Decision	Result	Attendance	Record
Regular season
October 5	7:05 PM	at Robert Morris*		Colonials Arena • Neville Township, Pennsylvania		Jurusik	W 2–1 ^{OT}	649	1–0–0
October 6	3:05 PM	at Robert Morris*		Colonials Arena • Neville Township, Pennsylvania		Jurusik	W 7–0	444	2–0–0
October 11	7:07 PM	vs. Alaska		MacInnes Student Ice Arena • Houghton, Michigan	FloHockey.tv	Jurusik	L 2–3	3,701	2–1–0 (0–1–0–0)
October 12	6:07 PM	vs. Alaska		MacInnes Student Ice Arena • Houghton, Michigan	FloHockey.tv	Jurusik	L 1–2	3,495	2–2–0 (0–2–0–0)
October 25	7:07 PM	at #17 Bowling Green		Slater Family Ice Arena • Bowling Green, Ohio	FloHockey.tv	Jurusik	L 1–3	2,250	2–3–0 (0–3–0–0)
October 26	7:07 PM	at #17 Bowling Green		Slater Family Ice Arena • Bowling Green, Ohio	FloHockey.tv	Beydoun	W 4–2	1,748	3–3–0 (1–3–0–0)
November 2	8:07 PM	at #14 North Dakota*		Ralph Engelstad Arena • Grand Forks, North Dakota (US Hockey Hall of Fame Game)		Beydoun	L 1–3	10,899	3–4–0 (1–3–0–0)
November 8	7:07 PM	vs. #3 Minnesota State		MacInnes Student Ice Arena • Houghton, Michigan	FloHockey.tv	Beydoun	L 0–3	3,185	3–5–0 (1–4–0–0)
November 9	6:07 PM	vs. #3 Minnesota State		MacInnes Student Ice Arena • Houghton, Michigan	FloHockey.tv	Pietila	L 1–2	3,328	3–6–0 (1–5–0–0)
November 15	7:07 PM	at Lake Superior State		Taffy Abel Arena • Sault Ste. Marie, Michigan	FloHockey.tv	Jurusik	W 4–2	1,907	4–6–0 (2–5–0–0)
November 16	6:07 PM	at Lake Superior State		Taffy Abel Arena • Sault Ste. Marie, Michigan	FloHockey.tv	Jurusik	W 2–1	2,094	5–6–0 (3–5–0–0)
November 22	7:07 PM	vs. #19 Northern Michigan		MacInnes Student Ice Arena • Houghton, Michigan	FloHockey.tv	Jurusik	W 3–2	3,337	6–6–0 (4–5–0–0)
November 23	6:07 PM	at #19 Northern Michigan		Berry Events Center • Marquette, Michigan	FloHockey.tv	Jurusik	W 3–2	3,945	7–6–0 (5–5–0–0)
November 29	11:13 PM	at Alaska		Carlson Center • Fairbanks, Alaska	FloHockey.tv	Jurusik	L 3–4	1,255	7–7–0 (5–6–0–0)
November 30	5:07 PM	at Alaska		Carlson Center • Fairbanks, Alaska	FloHockey.tv	Jurusik	W 2–1	1,365	8–7–0 (6–6–0–0)
December 6	7:07 PM	vs. Alaska Anchorage		MacInnes Student Ice Arena • Houghton, Michigan	FloHockey.tv	Jurusik	W 2–1	2,689	9–7–0 (7–6–0–0)
December 7	7:07 PM	vs. Alaska Anchorage		MacInnes Student Ice Arena • Houghton, Michigan	FloHockey.tv	Jurusik	W 4–1	2,838	10–7–0 (8–6–0–0)
December 13	7:07 PM	vs. #4 Clarkson*		MacInnes Student Ice Arena • Houghton, Michigan		Jurusik	T 2–2 ^{OT}	2,885	10–7–1 (8–6–0–0)
December 14	7:07 PM	vs. #4 Clarkson*		MacInnes Student Ice Arena • Houghton, Michigan		Jurusik	L 2–4	3,008	10–8–1 (8–6–0–0)
Great Lakes Invitational
December 30	1:07 PM	vs. #17 Michigan State*		Little Caesars Arena • Detroit, Michigan (GLI Semifinal)		Jurusik	W 4–2	16,139	11–8–1 (8–6–0–0)
December 31	2:37 PM	vs. Michigan*		Little Caesars Arena • Detroit, Michigan (GLI Championship)	FSD	Jurusik	W 4–2	10,240	12–8–1 (8–6–0–0)
January 4	9:05 PM	at #17 Arizona State*		Oceanside Ice Arena • Tempe, Arizona		Jurusik	L 3–4	768	12–9–1 (8–6–0–0)
January 5	5:00 PM	at #17 Arizona State*		Oceanside Ice Arena • Tempe, Arizona		Jurusik	W 3–2	796	13–9–1 (8–6–0–0)
January 10	7:07 PM	vs. #16 Bowling Green	#17	MacInnes Student Ice Arena • Houghton, Michigan	FloHockey.tv	Jurusik	L 2–3	2,413	13–10–1 (8–7–0–0)
January 11	6:07 PM	vs. #16 Bowling Green	#17	MacInnes Student Ice Arena • Houghton, Michigan	FloHockey.tv	Jurusik	T 2–2 ^{3x3 OTL}	2,702	13–10–2 (8–7–1–0)
January 17	8:07 PM	at Bemidji State	#19	Sanford Center • Bemidji, Minnesota	FloHockey.tv	Jurusik	L 1–4	2,617	13–11–2 (8–8–1–0)
January 18	7:07 PM	at Bemidji State	#19	Sanford Center • Bemidji, Minnesota	FloHockey.tv	Jurusik	T 1–1 ^{3x3 OTL}	2,617	13–11–3 (8–8–2–0)
January 24	7:07 PM	vs. Ferris State		MacInnes Student Ice Arena • Houghton, Michigan	FloHockey.tv	Jurusik	W 2–1	2,705	14–11–3 (9–8–2–0)
January 25	6:07 PM	vs. Ferris State		MacInnes Student Ice Arena • Houghton, Michigan	FloHockey.tv	Jurusik	L 1–2	2,928	14–12–3 (9–9–2–0)
January 31	8:07 PM	at Alabama–Huntsville		Von Braun Center • Huntsville, Alabama	FloHockey.tv	Jurusik	W 4–1	2,113	15–12–3 (10–9–2–0)
February 1	7:07 PM	at Alabama–Huntsville		Von Braun Center • Huntsville, Alabama	FloHockey.tv	Jurusik	L 1–3	1,136	15–13–3 (10–10–2–0)
February 7	7:07 PM	vs. Lake Superior State		MacInnes Student Ice Arena • Houghton, Michigan	FloHockey.tv	Pietila	L 3–7	3,381	15–14–3 (10–11–2–0)
February 8	5:07 PM	vs. Lake Superior State		MacInnes Student Ice Arena • Houghton, Michigan	FloHockey.tv	Beydoun	W 4–3 ^{OT}	3,385	16–14–3 (11–11–2–0)
February 14	7:07 PM	at Ferris State		Ewigleben Arena • Big Rapids, Michigan	FloHockey.tv	Jurusik	W 3–2	1,341	17–14–3 (12–11–2–0)
February 15	6:07 PM	at Ferris State		Ewigleben Arena • Big Rapids, Michigan	FloHockey.tv	Jurusik	W 2–0	1,963	18–14–3 (13–11–2–0)
February 28	7:20 PM	at Northern Michigan		Berry Events Center • Marquette, Michigan	FloHockey.tv	Jurusik	W 8–4	4,030	19–14–3 (14–11–2–0)
February 29	6:07 PM	vs. Northern Michigan		MacInnes Student Ice Arena • Houghton, Michigan	FloHockey.tv	Jurusik	L 2–3	4,053	19–15–3 (14–12–2–0)
WCHA Tournament
March 6	7:07 PM	at Northern Michigan*		Berry Events Center • Marquette, Michigan (WCHA Quarterfinals Game 1)		Jurusik	W 4–1	3,209	20–15–3 (14–12–2–0)
March 7	6:07 PM	at Northern Michigan*		Berry Events Center • Marquette, Michigan (WCHA Quarterfinals Game 2)		Jurusik	W 4–3 ^{3OT}	3,765	21–15–3 (14–12–2–0)
Remainder of Tournament Cancelled
*Non-conference game. ^{#}Rankings from USCHO.com Poll. All times are in Eastern Time.

== Scoring Statistics ==
Name	Position	Games	Goals	Assists	Points	PIM
Alec Broetzman	LW	39	16	11	27	23
Trenton Bliss	F	39	12	15	27	35
Alex Smith	RW	39	7	16	23	20
Brian Halonen	LW	39	12	10	22	22
Tommy Parrottino	F	35	14	7	21	2
Colin Swoyer	D	39	4	17	21	32
Logan Pietila	F	39	8	12	20	10
Eric Gotz	D	38	4	16	20	10
Parker Saretsky	F	36	5	12	17	6
Seamus Donohue	D	39	3	14	17	41
Justin Misiak	C	39	2	9	11	23
Logan Ganie	LW	34	4	5	9	8
Tyler Rockwell	D	38	1	8	9	10
Raymond Brice	F	28	6	2	8	6
Greyson Reitmeier	LW/C	33	2	5	7	6
Keegan Ford	D	27	2	3	5	21
Brenden Datema	D	24	1	2	3	18
Chris Lipe	D	36	1	2	3	12
Matt Jurusik	G	34	0	3	3	6
Jake Crespi	RW	20	0	2	2	14
Cooper Watson	D	11	0	1	1	8
David Raisanen	F	2	0	0	0	2
Tyrell Buckley	D	3	0	0	0	7
Todd Kiilunen	D	5	0	0	0	2
Robbie Beydoun	G	5	0	0	0	0
Blake Pietila	G	6	0	0	0	0
Marcus Russell	F	8	0	0	0	4
Mitch Meek	D	10	0	0	0	2
Zach Noble	F	12	0	0	0	6
T. J. Polglaze	F	29	0	0	0	0
Bench	-	-	-	-	-	4
Total			104	172	276	380

== Goaltending statistics ==
Name	Games	Minutes	Wins	Losses	Ties	Goals against	Saves	Shut outs	SV %	GAA
Matt Jurusik	34	1948	19	10	3	67	818	2	.924	2.06
Robbie Beydoun	5	258	2	2	0	10	114	0	.919	2.32
Blake Pietila	6	185	0	3	0	10	66	0	.868	3.24
Empty Net	-	16	-	-	-	2	-	-	-	-
Total	39	2408	21	15	3	89	998	2	.918	2.22

== Rankings ==
Poll	Week																							
Poll	Pre	1	2	3	4	5	6	7	8	9	10	11	12	13	14	15	16	17	18	19	20	21	22	23 (Final)
USCHO.com	NR	NR	NR	NR	NR	NR	NR	NR	NR	NR	NR	NR	NR	17	19	NR	NR	NR	NR	NR	NR	NR	NR	NR
USA Today	NR	NR	NR	NR	NR	NR	NR	NR	NR	NR	NR	NR	NR	NR	NR	NR	NR	NR	NR	NR	NR	NR	NR	NR

== Players drafted into the NHL ==
=== 2020 NHL entry draft ===
Round	Pick	Player	NHL team
5	142	Carson Bantle†	Arizona Coyotes

† incoming freshman
