= 2026–27 North Dakota Fighting Hawks men's ice hockey season =

- Conference: NCHC
- Home ice: Ralph Engelstad Arena

Rankings
- USCHO: #7
- USA Hockey: #6

Record
- Overall: 9–3–1
- Conference: 5–0–1
- Home: 6–0–1
- Road: 3–2–0
- Neutral: 0–1–0

Coaches and captains
- Head coach: Dane Jackson
- Assistant coaches: Matt Smaby; Dillon Simpson; Bryn Chyzyk
- Captain: Cole Reschny
- Alternate captain(s): Cody Croal; Anthony Menghini; Mac Swanson

The 2026–27 North Dakota Fighting Hawks men's ice hockey season is the 87th season of play for the program and 14th in the NCHC. The Fighting Hawks represent the University of North Dakota in the 2026–27 NCAA Division I men's ice hockey season, play their home games at Ralph Engelstad Arena, and are coached by Dane Jackson in his second season as head coach.

== Season ==
The Fighting Hawks fell to the Michigan State Spartans in the 2026 US Hockey Hall of Fame Game on October 31, 2026, which featured more first-round NHL draft picks than any previous college hockey game. The 2026–27 season will also mark the 47th and final season for North Dakota with radio coverage of games by longtime broadcaster Tim Hennessy.

== Departures ==
Player	Position	Nationality	Cause
Dalton Andrew	Forward	Canada	Transferred to Long Island
Ian Engel	Defense	United States	Transferred to Northern Michigan
Gibson Homer	Goaltender	United States	Transferred to Providence
Dylan James	Forward	Canada	Graduation (signed with Detroit Red Wings)
Jayden Jubenvill	Defense	Canada	Transferred to Omaha
David Klee	Forward	United States	Transferred to Notre Dame
Cade Littler	Forward	United States	Transferred to Arizona State
Jake Livanavage	Defense	United States	Signed professional contract (Pittsburgh Penguins)
Ellis Rickwood	Forward	Canada	Graduation (signed with Texas Stars)
Zach Sandy	Goaltender	United States	Graduation (retired)
Andrew Strathmann	Defense	United States	Transferred to Quinnipiac
Ben Strinden	Forward	United States	Graduation (signed with Milwaukee Admirals)
Abram Wiebe	Defense	Canada	Signed professional contract (Calgary Flames)
Tyler Young	Forward	United States	Graduation (retired)
Bennett Zmolek	Defense	United States	Graduation (retired)

== Recruiting ==
Player	Position	Nationality	Age	Notes
Brasen Boser	Defense	United States	22	Minot, ND; transfer from Arizona State
Carson Carels	Defense	Canada	18	Cypress River, MB; selected 6th overall in 2026
Connor Davis	Forward	Canada	19	Vaudreuil-Dorion, QC; selected 129th overall in 2026
Bauer Dumanski	Defense	Canada	21	Drake, SK
Caleb Heil	Goaltender	United States	20	Victoria, MN; selected 193rd overall in 2025
Garrett Lindberg	Defense	United States	19	Moorhead, MN
Gavin Lindberg	Forward	United States	22	Moorhead, MN; transfer from Colorado College
Ethan MacKenzie	Defense	Canada	20	Peachland, BC; selected 69th overall in 2026
Kasper Magnussen	Forward	Norway	22	Fredrikstad, NO; transfer from Bemidji State
Hudson Malinoski	Forward	Canada	22	Saskatoon, SK; transfer from Providence; selected 153rd overall in 2023
Alex Scheiwiller	Goaltender	Canada	21	Calgary, AB
Ashton Schultz	Forward	United States	20	Minnetonka, MN; selected 167th overall in 2025
Brock Schultz	Forward	United States	21	East Grand Forks, MN
Cooper Simpson	Forward	United States	19	Shakopee, MN; selected 79th overall in 2025

== Roster ==
As of September 16, 2026.

No.	Nat.	Player	Class	Pos	Height	Weight	DoB	Hometown	Previous team	NHL rights
2	(United States)	Garrett Lindberg	Freshman	D	5' 11" (1.8 m)	201 lb (91 kg)	2007-03-08	Moorhead, Minnesota	Fargo (USHL)	—
3	(Canada)	Connor Davis	Freshman	F	6' 2" (1.88 m)	197 lb (89 kg)	2006-11-09	Vaudreuil-Dorion, Quebec	Cedar Rapids (USHL)	VAN, 129th overall 2026
4	(Canada)	Carson Carels	Freshman	D	6' 2" (1.88 m)	192 lb (87 kg)	2008-06-23	Cypress River, Manitoba	Prince George (WHL)	CGY, 6th overall 2026
5	(United States)	Brasen Boser	Junior	D	5' 11" (1.8 m)	190 lb (86 kg)	2004-02-29	Minot, North Dakota	Arizona State (NCHC)	—
6	(United States)	EJ Emery	Junior	D	6' 3" (1.91 m)	193 lb (88 kg)	2006-03-30	Compton, California	USNTDP (USHL)	NYR, 30th overall 2024
7	(United States)	Mac Swanson (A)	Junior	F	5' 9" (1.75 m)	170 lb (77 kg)	2006-01-10	Anchorage, Alaska	Fargo (USHL)	PIT, 207th overall 2024
8	(Canada)	Ollie Josephson	Sophomore	F	6' 1" (1.85 m)	191 lb (87 kg)	2006-07-22	Victoria, British Columbia	Red Deer (WHL)	SEA, 105nd overall 2024
9	(United States)	Will Zellers	Sophomore	F	6' 0" (1.83 m)	185 lb (84 kg)	2006-04-04	Maple Grove, Minnesota	Green Bay (USHL)	BOS, 76th overall 2024
10	(Norway)	Kasper Magnussen	Senior	F	6' 0" (1.83 m)	208 lb (94 kg)	2004-02-19	Fredrikstad, Norway	Bemidji State (CCHA)	—
11	(United States)	Ashton Schultz	Freshman	F	6' 0" (1.83 m)	195 lb (88 kg)	2006-10-03	Minnetonka, Minnesota	Sioux City (USHL)	BUF, 167th overall 2025
13	(United States)	Sam Laurila	Sophomore	D	6' 1" (1.85 m)	195 lb (88 kg)	2006-09-02	Moorhead, Minnesota	Fargo (USHL)	NYI, 138th overall 2025
14	(Canada)	Bauer Dumanski	Freshman	D	6' 2" (1.88 m)	209 lb (95 kg)	2005-01-05	Lockwood, Saskatchewan	Prince George (WHL)	—
15	(United States)	Jack Kernan	Sophomore	F	6' 2" (1.88 m)	205 lb (93 kg)	2005-03-30	Maple Grove, Minnesota	Des Moines (USHL)	—
17	(Canada)	Cole Reschny (C)	Sophomore	F	5' 11" (1.8 m)	190 lb (86 kg)	2007-04-06	Macklin, Saskatchewan	Victoria (WHL)	CGY, 18th overall 2025
18	(Canada)	Keaton Verhoeff	Sophomore	D	6' 4" (1.93 m)	214 lb (97 kg)	2008-06-19	Fort Saskatchewan, Alberta	Victoria (WHL)	SJS, 9th overall 2026
19	(United States)	Cody Croal (A)	Junior	F	5' 11" (1.8 m)	200 lb (91 kg)	2003-06-17	North Branch, Minnesota	Muskegon (USHL)	—
20	(United States)	Gavin Lindberg	Junior	F	6' 1" (1.85 m)	200 lb (91 kg)	2004-04-20	Moorhead, Minnesota	Colorado College (NCHC)	—
21	(United States)	Cooper Simpson	Freshman	F	6' 1" (1.85 m)	192 lb (87 kg)	2007-02-05	Shakopee, Minnesota	Youngstown (USHL)	BOS, 79th overall 2025
24	(Canada)	Josh Zakreski	Sophomore	F	6' 0" (1.83 m)	198 lb (90 kg)	2005-12-17	Saskatoon, Saskatchewan	Portland (WHL)	—
25	(Canada)	Ethan MacKenzie	Freshman	D	6' 1" (1.85 m)	195 lb (88 kg)	2006-09-02	Peachland, British Columbia	Edmonton (WHL)	TOR, 69th overall 2026
27	(United States)	Anthony Menghini (A)	Senior	F	5' 10" (1.78 m)	195 lb (88 kg)	2002-12-03	Brainerd, Minnesota	Minnesota Duluth (NCHC)	—
28	(United States)	Brock Schultz	Freshman	F	5' 8" (1.73 m)	176 lb (80 kg)	2005-07-10	East Grand Forks, Minnesota	Sioux Falls (USHL)	—
29	(Canada)	Hudson Malinoski	Senior	F	6' 2" (1.88 m)	195 lb (88 kg)	2004-05-19	Saskatoon, Saskatchewan	Providence (HEA)	TOR, 153rd overall 2023
30	(United States)	Caleb Heil	Freshman	G	6' 2" (1.88 m)	207 lb (94 kg)	2006-06-19	Victoria, Minnesota	Madison (USHL)	TBL, 193rd overall 2025
32	(Canada)	Alex Scheiwiller	Junior	G	6' 1" (1.85 m)	187 lb (85 kg)	2005-01-10	Calgary, Alberta	Canmore (AJHL)	—
35	(Czech Republic)	Jan Špunar	Sophomore	G	6' 3" (1.91 m)	202 lb (92 kg)	2004-05-30	Olomouc, Czech Republic	Dubuque (USHL)	—

1.Zellers was selected by the Colorado Avalanche in 2024, but his NHL rights were traded to the Boston Bruins on March 7, 2025.

== Standings ==
2026–27 National Collegiate Hockey Conference Standings
	Conference record										Overall record					
	GP	W	L	T	OTW	OTL	SW	PTS	GF	GA	GP	W	L	T	GF	GA
#5 Minnesota Duluth	6	4	2	0	0	0	0	12	16	9	14	9	3	2	47	22
#3 Denver	4	4	0	0	1	0	0	11	13	5	12	9	2	1	47	24
#7 North Dakota	4	3	0	1	0	0	0	10	14	5	11	7	3	1	40	25
#18 Miami	6	3	3	0	0	0	0	9	13	16	12	8	4	0	35	26
Omaha	6	2	3	1	0	0	1	8	16	17	10	4	5	1	30	29
#4 Western Michigan	4	2	1	1	1	0	1	7	12	10	11	8	2	1	52	21
Arizona State	4	1	3	0	0	1	0	4	7	11	10	5	5	0	33	32
#12 Colorado College	4	1	3	0	0	1	0	4	9	13	12	7	4	1	39	24
St. Cloud State	6	1	4	1	0	0	0	4	9	19	11	3	7	1	23	35
St. Thomas	4	1	3	0	0	0	0	3	7	11	10	4	6	0	25	29
Championship: March 19, 2027 † indicates conference regular season champion (Penrose Cup) * indicates conference tournament champion (National Cup); Rankings: USCHO.com Top 20 Poll; updated November 16, 2026

== Schedule and results ==
Date	Time	Opponent^{#}	Rank^{#}	Site	TV	Decision	Result	Attendance	Record
Exhibition
October 3	6:07 pm	Augustana*	#4	Ralph Engelstad Arena • Grand Forks, North Dakota (Exhibition)	Midco Sports	Špunar	W 4–1	11,658	—
October 4	3:07 pm	Manitoba*	#4	Ralph Engelstad Arena • Grand Forks, North Dakota (Exhibition)	Midco Sports	Heil	W 5–1	11,095	—
Regular Season
October 9	7:07 pm	at Bemidji State*	#4	Sanford Center • Bemidji, Minnesota	Midco Sports Plus	Špunar	W 3–2	3,680	1–0–0
October 10	6:07 pm	Bemidji State*	#4	Ralph Engelstad Arena • Grand Forks, North Dakota	Midco Sports	Špunar	W 4–3	11,570	2–0–0
October 16	7:07 pm	Bentley*	#4	Ralph Engelstad Arena • Grand Forks, North Dakota	Midco Sports	Heil	W 5–0	11,627	3–0–0
October 17	6:07 pm	Bentley*	#4	Ralph Engelstad Arena • Grand Forks, North Dakota	Midco Sports	Heil	W 5–0	11,652	4–0–0
October 22	7:00 pm	at Minnesota*	#3	3M Arena at Mariucci • Minneapolis, Minnesota (Rivalry)	Fox 9, Midco Sports	Špunar	L 5–3	10,566	4–1–0
October 23	6:00 pm	at Minnesota*	#3	3M Arena at Mariucci • Minneapolis, Minnesota (Rivalry)	Fox 9+, Midco Sports	Špunar	L 5–3	10,637	4–2–0
October 31	7:07 pm	vs. #4 Michigan State*	#8	H-E-B Center at Cedar Park • Cedar Park, Texas (US Hockey Hall of Fame Game)	Midco Sports	Heil	L 5–3	6,483	4–3–0
November 6	7:07 pm	#5 Western Michigan	#10	Ralph Engelstad Arena • Grand Forks, North Dakota	Midco Sports	Špunar	T 2–2 ^{SOL}	11,571	4–3–1 (0–0–1)
November 7	6:07 pm	#5 Western Michigan	#10	Ralph Engelstad Arena • Grand Forks, North Dakota	Midco Sports	Špunar	W 4–1	11,622	5–3–1 (1–0–1)
November 13	7:00 pm	at St. Thomas	#8	Lee & Penny Anderson Arena • St. Paul, Minnesota	Fox 9+, Midco Sports	Špunar	W 2–0	3,804	6–3–1 (2–0–1)
November 14	6:00 pm	at St. Thomas	#8	Lee & Penny Anderson Arena • St. Paul, Minnesota	Fox 9+, Midco Sports	Špunar	W 6–2	4,125	7–3–1 (3–0–1)
November 20	7:07 pm	St. Cloud State	#7	Ralph Engelstad Arena • Grand Forks, North Dakota	Midco Sports	Heil	W 5–3	11,574	8–3–1 (4–0–1)
November 21	6:07 pm	St. Cloud State	#7	Ralph Engelstad Arena • Grand Forks, North Dakota	Midco Sports	Heil	W 3–0	11,557	9–3–1 (5–0–1)
November 27	7:07 pm	Lindenwood*		Ralph Engelstad Arena • Grand Forks, North Dakota	Midco Sports				
November 28	6:07 pm	Lindenwood*		Ralph Engelstad Arena • Grand Forks, North Dakota	Midco Sports				
December 4	8:00 pm	at Denver		Magness Arena • Denver, Colorado (Rivalry)	NCHC.tv				
December 5	7:00 pm	at Denver		Magness Arena • Denver, Colorado (Rivalry)	NCHC.tv				
December 11	7:07 pm	Minnesota Duluth		Ralph Engelstad Arena • Grand Forks, North Dakota	Midco Sports				
December 12	6:07 pm	Minnesota Duluth		Ralph Engelstad Arena • Grand Forks, North Dakota	Midco Sports				
January 1	7:07 pm	Clarkson*		Ralph Engelstad Arena • Grand Forks, North Dakota	Midco Sports				
January 2	6:07 pm	Clarkson*		Ralph Engelstad Arena • Grand Forks, North Dakota	Midco Sports				
January 8	6:05 pm	at Miami		Steve Cady Arena • Oxford, Ohio	Ryz Sports Network				
January 9	5:05 pm	at Miami		Steve Cady Arena • Oxford, Ohio	NCHC.tv				
January 15	7:07 pm	St. Thomas		Ralph Engelstad Arena • Grand Forks, North Dakota	Midco Sports				
January 16	6:07 pm	St. Thomas		Ralph Engelstad Arena • Grand Forks, North Dakota	Midco Sports				
January 22	7:00 pm	at Omaha		Baxter Arena • Omaha, Nebraska	NCHC.tv				
January 22	7:00 pm	at Omaha		Baxter Arena • Omaha, Nebraska	NCHC.tv				
February 5	7:07 pm	Colorado College		Ralph Engelstad Arena • Grand Forks, North Dakota	Midco Sports				
February 6	6:07 pm	Colorado College		Ralph Engelstad Arena • Grand Forks, North Dakota	Midco Sports				
February 12	8:00 pm	at Arizona State		Mullett Arena • Tempe, Arizona	NCHC.tv				
February 13	6:00 pm	at Arizona State		Mullett Arena • Tempe, Arizona	NCHC.tv				
February 19	7:07 pm	Miami		Ralph Engelstad Arena • Grand Forks, North Dakota	Midco Sports				
February 20	6:07 pm	Miami		Ralph Engelstad Arena • Grand Forks, North Dakota	Midco Sports				
February 26	7:07 pm	at Minnesota Duluth		AMSOIL Arena • Duluth, Minnesota	NCHC.tv				
February 27	6:07 pm	at Minnesota Duluth		AMSOIL Arena • Duluth, Minnesota	NCHC.tv				
NCHC Tournament
March 5	TBA	TBD*		TBD • Higher Seed (NCHC First Round Game 1)	TBA				
March 6	TBA	TBD*		TBD • Higher Seed (NCHC First Round Game 2)	TBA				
March 7	TBA	TBD*		TBD • Higher Seed (NCHC First Round Game 3, if necessary)	TBA				
*Non-conference game. ^{#}Rankings from USCHO.com Poll. All times are in Central Time. Source:

== Awards and honors ==
Player	Award	Ref
Cole Reschny	NCHC Preseason All-Conference Team	
Jan Špunar	NCHC Preseason All-Conference Team	
Keaton Verhoeff	NCHC Preseason All-Conference Team	

== Rankings ==
Ranking movements Legend: ██ Increase in ranking ██ Decrease in ranking т = Tied with team above or below ( ) = First-place votes
	Week																											
Poll	Pre	1	2	3	4	5	6	7	8	9	10	11	12	13	14	15	16	17	18	19	20	21	22	23	24	25	26	Final
USCHO.com	4 (2)	4	4	3	8	10	8	7																				
USA Hockey	4 (1)	4	4	3	8	10	7т	6																				
