= 2019–20 Lake Superior State Lakers men's ice hockey season =

Sports season

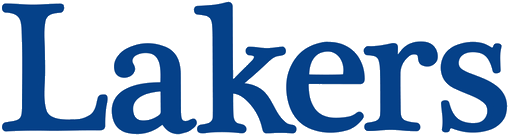
- Conference: 7th WCHA
- Home ice: Taffy Abel Arena

Rankings
- USCHO.com: NR
- USA Today: NR

Record
- Overall: 14–23–4
- Conference: 11–13–4–4
- Home: 8–7–3
- Road: 6–15–1
- Neutral: 0–1–0

Coaches and captains
- Head coach: Damon Whitten
- Assistant coaches: Mike York; Zack Cisek; Mike Gugin

The 2019–20 Lake Superior State Lakers men's ice hockey season was the 54th season of play for the program, the 47th at the Division I level and the 7th in the WCHA conference. The Lakers represented Lake Superior State University and were coached by Damon Whitten, in his 6th season.

== Roster ==
As of September 9, 2019.

No.	Nat.	Player	Class	Pos	Height	Weight	DoB	Hometown	Previous team	NHL rights
1	(Canada)	Roman Bengert	Junior	G	6' 2" (1.88 m)	180 lb (82 kg)	1996-03-21	Dartmouth, Nova Scotia	Steinbach Pistons (MJHL)	—
2	(Canada)	Michael Mannara	Freshman	D	5' 10" (1.78 m)	190 lb (86 kg)	1999-03-21	Caledon, Ontario	Trenton Golden Hawks (OJHL)	—
3	(United States)	Will Riedell	Junior	D	6' 2" (1.88 m)	198 lb (90 kg)	1996-10-09	Greensboro, North Carolina	New Jersey Titans (NAHL)	—
4	(Canada)	Tyler Anderson	Junior	D	6' 4" (1.93 m)	227 lb (103 kg)	1996-01-21	Niverville, Manitoba	Prince George Spruce Kings (BCHL)	—
5	(Sweden)	Arvid Henrikson	Freshman	D	6' 5" (1.96 m)	211 lb (96 kg)	1998-02-23	Stockholm, Sweden	Austin Bruins (NAHL)	MTL, 187th overall 2016
6	(United States)	Alec Semandel	Sophomore	D	6' 3" (1.91 m)	194 lb (88 kg)	1998-05-23	Waunakee, Wisconsin	Janesville Jets (NAHL)	—
7	(Canada)	Mitchell Oliver	Sophomore	D	6' 0" (1.83 m)	174 lb (79 kg)	1997-06-17	Kelowna, British Columbia	Alberni Valley Bulldogs (BCHL)	—
8	(United States)	Dustin Manz	Freshman	F	5' 10" (1.78 m)	194 lb (88 kg)	1999-09-21	Vanderbilt, Michigan	Prince George Spruce Kings (BCHL)	—
9	(Canada)	Alex Ambrosio	Sophomore	F	5' 10" (1.78 m)	175 lb (79 kg)	1997-03-12	Burnaby, British Columbia	Coquitlam Express (BCHL)	—
10	(Canada)	Brendan McKay	Senior	F	6' 1" (1.85 m)	202 lb (92 kg)	1994-11-06	Toronto, Ontario	Weyburn Red Wings (SJHL)	—
11	(Canada)	Brayden Gelsinger	Senior	F	5' 9" (1.75 m)	165 lb (75 kg)	1995-02-22	Regina, Saskatchewan	Victoria Grizzlies (BCHL)	—
12	(Canada)	Owen Guy	Sophomore	F	5' 10" (1.78 m)	179 lb (81 kg)	1998-01-05	Mountain, Ontario	Ottawa Jr. Senators (CCHL)	—
13	(Canada)	Ian Johnston	Senior	F	5' 11" (1.8 m)	178 lb (81 kg)	1997-04-16	Ottawa, Ontario	Brockville Braves (CCHL)	—
14	(Japan)	Yuki Miura	Junior	F	5' 11" (1.8 m)	170 lb (77 kg)	1996-07-19	Tokyo, Japan	Waterloo Black Hawks (USHL)	—
15	(Sweden)	Jacob Nordqvist	Sophomore	D	5' 9" (1.75 m)	181 lb (82 kg)	1998-02-12	Gothenburg, Sweden	Madison Capitols (USHL)	—
16	(United States)	Ashton Calder	Sophomore	F	6' 1" (1.85 m)	201 lb (91 kg)	1998-02-09	Sault Ste. Marie, Michigan	Lincoln Stars (USHL)	—
17	(United States)	Chase Gamelin	Junior	F	5' 11" (1.8 m)	183 lb (83 kg)	1996-07-20	Sault Ste. Marie, Michigan	Brookings Blizzard (NAHL)	—
18	(United States)	Bryan Basilico	Senior	F	6' 2" (1.88 m)	198 lb (90 kg)	1995-01-27	Macomb, Michigan	West Kelowna Warriors (BCHL)	—
19	(Latvia)	Robert Blueger	Freshman	F	6' 3" (1.91 m)	185 lb (84 kg)	1998-08-03	Riga, Latvia	Madison Capitols (USHL)	—
20	(Slovakia)	Miroslav Mucha	Sophomore	F	6' 1" (1.85 m)	197 lb (89 kg)	1997-10-07	Bytča, Slovakia	Minot Minotauros (NAHL)	—
21	(United States)	Max Humitz	Senior	F	5' 8" (1.73 m)	156 lb (71 kg)	1995-07-08	Livonia, Michigan	Tri-City Storm (USHL)	—
22	(Germany)	Lukas Kälble	Junior	D	6' 1" (1.85 m)	209 lb (95 kg)	1997-10-13	Mannheim, Germany	Fargo Force (USHL)	—
23	(United States)	Colin Saccoman	Senior	D	6' 2" (1.88 m)	191 lb (87 kg)	1997-03-05	Stillwater, Minnesota	Waterloo Black Hawks (USHL)	—
24	(Sweden)	Hampus Eriksson	Junior	F	6' 6" (1.98 m)	211 lb (96 kg)	1996-09-11	Forsbacka, Sweden	Fairbanks Ice Dogs (NAHL)	—
25	(Canada)	Bennet Vida	Junior	D	6' 1" (1.85 m)	200 lb (91 kg)	1996-04-24	St. Albert, Alberta	New York Apple Core (EHL)	—
26	(Canada)	Pete Veillette	Sophomore	F	5' 9" (1.75 m)	170 lb (77 kg)	1997-02-26	Drummondville, Quebec	Ottawa Jr. Senators (CCHL)	—
27	(United States)	Niko Esposito-Selivanov	Freshman	F	5' 10" (1.78 m)	180 lb (82 kg)	1998-09-23	St. Petersburg, Florida	Cowichan Valley Capitals (BCHL)	—
29	(France)	Louis Boudon	Freshman	F	5' 11" (1.8 m)	172 lb (78 kg)	1998-10-04	Grenoble, France	Northeast Generals (NAHL)	—
30	(Latvia)	Mareks Mitens	Junior	G	6' 1" (1.85 m)	185 lb (84 kg)	1998-01-29	Ventspils, Latvia	Aston Rebels (NAHL)	—
31	(United States)	Seth Eisele	Freshman	G	6' 5" (1.96 m)	195 lb (88 kg)	1998-10-30	Lake Elmo, Minnesota	Lone Star Brahmas (NAHL)	—

== Standings ==
2019–20 Western Collegiate Hockey Association Standings
	Conference record								Overall record					
	GP	W	L	T	3/SW	PTS	GF	GA	GP	W	L	T	GF	GA
#2 Minnesota State	28	23	4	1	1	71	115	38	36	29	5	2	141	53
#11 Bemidji State	28	20	5	3	2	65	101	46	34	20	9	5	111	65
Northern Michigan	28	16	11	1	1	50	92	87	36	18	14	4	115	112
Alaska	28	14	9	5	2	49	73	65	34	16	13	5	84	86
Bowling Green	28	14	10	4	3	49	85	70	36	19	13	4	112	92
Michigan Tech	28	14	12	2	0	44	68	65	37	19	15	3	96	85
Lake Superior State	28	11	13	4	4	41	66	77	38	13	21	4	90	112
Alaska Anchorage	28	4	18	6	3	21	56	96	34	4	23	7	66	122
Ferris State	28	5	21	2	0	17	54	100	35	7	26	2	70	127
Alabama–Huntsville	28	2	20	6	1	13	50	116	34	2	26	6	57	145
Championship: March 21, 2020 † indicates conference regular season champion; * indicates conference tournament champion Rankings: USCHO.com Top 20 Poll; updated March 1, 2020

== Schedule and results ==
Date	Time	Opponent^{#}	Rank^{#}	Site	TV	Decision	Result	Attendance	Record
Regular season
October 5	7:07 PM	vs. Merrimack*		Taffy Abel Arena • Sault Ste. Marie, Michigan		Mitens	W 6–2	1,860	1–0–0
October 6	5:07 PM	vs. Merrimack*		Taffy Abel Arena • Sault Ste. Marie, Michigan		Mitens	W 4–3	1,435	2–0–0
October 11	7:37 PM	vs. #2 Denver*		Taffy Abel Arena • Sault Ste. Marie, Michigan		Mitens	L 1–3	1,778	2–1–0
October 12	7:07 PM	vs. #2 Denver*		Taffy Abel Arena • Sault Ste. Marie, Michigan		Mitens	L 3–4	2,414	2–2–0
October 18	7:30 PM	at Michigan*		Yost Ice Arena • Ann Arbor, Michigan		Mitens	L 0–4	5,405	2–3–0
October 19	7:30 PM	at Michigan*		Yost Ice Arena • Ann Arbor, Michigan		Mitens	L 3–4	5,404	2–4–0
October 25	7:10 PM	at #5 Notre Dame*		Compton Family Ice Arena • Notre Dame, Indiana	NBCSN	Mitens	L 2–5	3,991	2–5–0
October 26	6:05 PM	at #5 Notre Dame*		Compton Family Ice Arena • Notre Dame, Indiana	NHL Network	Bengert	L 4–6	4,178	2–6–0
November 1	7:07 PM	vs. Ferris State		Taffy Abel Arena • Sault Ste. Marie, Michigan	FloHockey.tv	Mitens	W 5–4 ^{OT}	1,746	3–6–0 (1–0–0–0)
November 2	7:07 PM	vs. Ferris State		Taffy Abel Arena • Sault Ste. Marie, Michigan	FloHockey.tv	Mitens	W 4–3	2,146	4–6–0 (2–0–0–0)
November 8	8:07 PM	at Bemidji State		Sanford Center • Bemidji, Minnesota		Mitens	L 1–7	2,955	4–7–0 (2–1–0–0)
November 9	7:07 PM	at Bemidji State		Sanford Center • Bemidji, Minnesota		Bengert	L 1–5	2,415	4–8–0 (2–2–0–0)
November 15	7:07 PM	vs. Michigan Tech		Taffy Abel Arena • Sault Ste. Marie, Michigan	FloHockey.tv	Mitens	L 2–4	1,907	4–9–0 (2–3–0–0)
November 16	6:07 PM	vs. Michigan Tech		Taffy Abel Arena • Sault Ste. Marie, Michigan	FloHockey.tv	Mitens	L 1–2	2,094	4–10–0 (2–4–0–0)
November 22	7:07 PM	at #17 Bowling Green		Slater Family Ice Arena • Bowling Green, Ohio	FloHockey.tv	Mitens	L 0–5	2,381	4–11–0 (2–5–0–0)
November 23	7:07 PM	at #17 Bowling Green		Slater Family Ice Arena • Bowling Green, Ohio	FloHockey.tv	Mitens	W 3–1	2,746	5–11–0 (3–5–0–0)
November 29	7:07 PM	vs. Bemidji State		Taffy Abel Arena • Sault Ste. Marie, Michigan	FloHockey.tv	Mitens	L 1–4	1,751	5–12–0 (3–6–0–0)
November 30	5:07 PM	vs. Bemidji State		Taffy Abel Arena • Sault Ste. Marie, Michigan	FloHockey.tv	Mitens	T 2–2 ^{3x3 OTW}	1,433	5–12–1 (3–6–1–1)
December 6	8:07 PM	at #1 Minnesota State		Mankato Civic Center • Mankato, Minnesota	FloHockey.tv	Mitens	L 1–5	4,330	5–13–1 (3–7–1–1)
December 7	7:07 PM	at #1 Minnesota State		Mankato Civic Center • Mankato, Minnesota	FloHockey.tv	Mitens	L 0–2	4,452	5–14–1 (3–8–1–1)
December 13	7:07 PM	vs. #10 Bowling Green		Taffy Abel Arena • Sault Ste. Marie, Michigan	FloHockey.tv	Mitens	L 0–2	1,381	5–15–1 (3–9–1–1)
December 14	7:07 PM	vs. #10 Bowling Green		Taffy Abel Arena • Sault Ste. Marie, Michigan	FloHockey.tv	Mitens	W 3–2 ^{OT}	1,463	6–15–1 (4–9–1–1)
Catamount Cup
December 28	4:00 PM	vs. #13 Providence*		Gutterson Fieldhouse • Burlington, Vermont (Catamount Cup)		Mitens	L 1–2 ^{OT}	3,397	6–16–1 (4–9–1–1)
December 29	7:30 PM	at Vermont*		Gutterson Fieldhouse • Burlington, Vermont (Catamount Cup)		Mitens	L 0–2	2,579	6–17–1 (4–9–1–1)
January 4	9:07 PM	at Alaska Anchorage		Wells Fargo Sports Complex • Anchorage, Alaska	FloHockey.tv	Mitens	L 0–2	725	6–18–1 (4–10–1–1)
January 5	7:07 PM	at Alaska Anchorage		Wells Fargo Sports Complex • Anchorage, Alaska	FloHockey.tv	Mitens	W 5–3	650	7–18–1 (5–10–1–1)
January 10	11:07 PM	at Alaska		Carlson Center • Fairbanks, Alaska	FloHockey.tv	Mitens	L 0–2	1,250	7–19–1 (5–11–1–1)
January 11	11:07 PM	at Alaska		Carlson Center • Fairbanks, Alaska	FloHockey.tv	Mitens	T 1–1 ^{3x3 OTW}	1,510	7–19–2 (5–11–2–2)
January 24	7:07 PM	vs. Alaska Anchorage		Taffy Abel Arena • Sault Ste. Marie, Michigan	FloHockey.tv	Mitens	W 3–2	1,870	8–19–2 (6–11–2–2)
January 25	7:07 PM	vs. Alaska Anchorage		Taffy Abel Arena • Sault Ste. Marie, Michigan	FloHockey.tv	Mitens	T 3–3 ^{3x3 OTW}	2,216	8–19–3 (6–11–3–3)
January 31	7:00 PM	vs. USNTDP*		Taffy Abel Arena • Sault Ste. Marie, Michigan (Exhibition)		Bengert	T 4–4 ^{SOL}	-	
February 7	7:07 PM	at Michigan Tech		MacInnes Student Ice Arena • Houghton, Michigan	FloHockey.tv	Mitens	W 7–3	3,381	9–19–3 (7–11–3–3)
February 8	5:07 PM	at Michigan Tech		MacInnes Student Ice Arena • Houghton, Michigan	FloHockey.tv	Mitens	L 3–4 ^{OT}	3,385	9–20–3 (7–12–3–3)
February 14	7:07 PM	vs. Alabama–Huntsville		Taffy Abel Arena • Sault Ste. Marie, Michigan	FloHockey.tv	Mitens	T 0–0 ^{SOW}	1,721	9–20–4 (7–12–4–4)
February 15	7:07 PM	vs. Alabama–Huntsville		GFL Memorial Gardens • Sault Ste. Marie, Ontario	FloHockey.tv	Mitens	W 4–1	3,169	10–20–4 (8–12–4–4)
February 21	7:07 PM	vs. Northern Michigan		Taffy Abel Arena • Sault Ste. Marie, Michigan	FloHockey.tv	Mitens	W 6–1	2,135	11–20–4 (9–12–4–4)
February 22	7:07 PM	vs. Northern Michigan		Taffy Abel Arena • Sault Ste. Marie, Michigan	FloHockey.tv	Mitens	L 1–5	2,904	11–21–4 (9–13–4–4)
February 28	7:07 PM	at Ferris State		Ewigleben Arena • Big Rapids, Michigan	FloHockey.tv	Mitens	W 5–0	1,717	12–21–4 (10–13–4–4)
February 29	6:07 PM	at Ferris State		Ewigleben Arena • Big Rapids, Michigan	FloHockey.tv	Bengert	W 4–2	1,802	13–21–4 (11–13–4–4)
WCHA Tournament
March 6	8:07 PM	vs. #10 Bemidji State*		Sanford Center • Bemidji, Minnesota (WCHA Quarterfinals Game 1)	FloHockey.tv	Mitens	L 0–2	2,042	13–22–4 (11–13–4–4)
March 7	7:07 PM	vs. #10 Bemidji State*		Sanford Center • Bemidji, Minnesota (WCHA Quarterfinals Game 2)	FloHockey.tv	Mitens	W 5–3	2,167	14–22–4 (11–13–4–4)
March 8	7:07 PM	vs. #10 Bemidji State*		Sanford Center • Bemidji, Minnesota (WCHA Quarterfinals Game 3)	FloHockey.tv	Mitens	L 1–3	1,766	14–23–4 (11–13–4–4)
Lake Superior State Lost Series 1–2
*Non-conference game. ^{#}Rankings from USCHO.com Poll. All times are in Eastern Time.

== Scoring statistics ==
Name	Position	Games	Goals	Assists	Points	PIM
Max Humitz	F	41	22	13	35	62
Ashton Calder	F	41	12	16	28	20
Louis Boudon	C	40	6	21	27	22
Pierre-Luc Veillette	C	41	12	14	26	4
Hampus Eriksson	C/W	41	6	18	24	18
William Riedell	D	41	5	13	18	34
Yuki Miura	C	41	2	12	14	2
Jacob Nordqvist	D	35	2	11	13	18
Lukas Kälble	D	41	2	10	12	24
Collin Saccoman	D	17	6	3	9	23
Dustin Manz	C	40	2	7	9	18
Brayden Gelsinger	LW	22	3	5	8	16
Miroslav Mucha	RW	30	3	5	8	20
Mitchell Oliver	D	34	0	8	8	18
Brendan McKay	LW	41	4	3	7	19
Alexandro Ambrosio	F	34	3	3	6	33
Tyler Anderson	D	40	1	4	5	24
Bryan Basilico	LW	39	2	2	4	18
Chase Gamelin	F	29	1	2	3	4
Arvid Henrikson	D	37	1	1	2	48
Alec Semandel	D	22	0	2	2	12
Niko Esposito-Selivanov	F	13	1	0	1	6
Owen Guy	C	7	0	1	1	0
Ian Johnston	D	9	0	1	1	0
Mareks Mitens	G	39	0	1	1	0
Robert Blueger	LW/RW	3	0	0	0	0
Roman Bengert	G	4	0	0	0	0
Bench	-	-	-	-	-	8
Total			96	176	272	471

== Goaltending statistics ==
Name	Games	Minutes	Wins	Losses	Ties	Goals against	Saves	Shut outs	SV %	GAA
Mareks Mitens	39	2292	13	21	4	98	1002	2	.911	2.57
Roman Bengert	4	177	1	2	0	14	177	0	.857	4.74
Empty Net	-	26	-	-	-	8	-	-	-	-
Total	41	2495	14	23	4	120	1086	2	.900	2.89

== Rankings ==
Poll	Week																							
Poll	Pre	1	2	3	4	5	6	7	8	9	10	11	12	13	14	15	16	17	18	19	20	21	22	23 (Final)
USCHO.com	NR	NR	NR	NR	NR	NR	NR	NR	NR	NR	NR	NR	NR	NR	NR	NR	NR	NR	NR	NR	NR	NR	NR	NR
USA Today	NR	NR	NR	NR	NR	NR	NR	NR	NR	NR	NR	NR	NR	NR	NR	NR	NR	NR	NR	NR	NR	NR	NR	NR
