= 2026–27 Miami RedHawks men's ice hockey season =

- Conference: NCHC
- Home ice: Steve Cady Arena

Rankings
- USCHO: #18
- USA Hockey: #18

Record
- Overall: 8–4–0
- Conference: 2–2–0
- Home: 5–2–0
- Road: 3–2–0

Coaches and captains
- Head coach: Anthony Noreen
- Assistant coaches: Troy Thibodeau; David Nies; Lionel Mauron
- Captain: Doug Grimes
- Alternate captain(s): Ethan Hay, Bradley Walker

The 2026–27 Miami RedHawks men's ice hockey season will be the 49th season of play for the program and the 14th in the NCHC. The RedHawks will represent Miami University in the 2026–27 NCAA Division I men's ice hockey season, play their home games at the Steve Cady Arena and be coached by Anthony Noreen in his 3rd season.

== Season ==
Miami was picked to finish fifth in the NCHC preseason media poll, receiving 175 points. The season is also the first in the NCHC for St. Thomas, which joined the conference from the CCHA.

On September 10, senior forward Doug Grimes was named team captain, with sophomores Ethan Hay and Bradley Walker serving as alternate captains. Miami had played the entire 2025–26 season without a single player wearing a letter, the first such season in program history.

== Departures ==
Player	Position	Nationality	Cause
Kyle Aucoin	Defenseman	Canada	Graduation (signed with Indy Fuel)
Nick Donato	Defenseman	United States	Graduation
David Grosek	Forward	United States	Departed Program
Maximilion Helgeson	Forward	United States	Graduation (signed with Cincinnati Cyclones
Owen Lalonde	Defenseman	Canada	Graduation
Mathis Langevin	Goaltender	Canada	Transferred to Augustana
Charlie Michaud	Defenseman	United States	Transferred to Penn State
Brayden Morrison	Forward	Canada	Graduation
Blake Mesenberg	Forward	United States	Graduation
Casper Nässén	Forward	Sweden	Transferred to Lake Superior State
Michael Quinn	Defenseman	United States	Transferred to Notre Dame
Justin Stupka	Forward	United States	Transferred to Ferris State

== Recruiting ==
Player	Position	Nationality	Age	Notes
Austin Baker	Forward	United States	20	White Lake Township, MI; transfer from Michigan State; selected 203rd overall in 2024
Chuck Blanchard	Forward	United States	21	West Hartford, Connecticut
Jack Hamilton	Defenseman	United States	20	Columbus, Ohio
David Helledy	Defenseman	United States	23	Milwaukee, Wisconsin; transfer from Bentley
Cal Huston	Defenseman	United States	21	Youngstown, Ohio
Matous Kucharcik	Forward	Czech Republic	19	Prague, Czech Republic
Layne Loomer	Forward	Canada	21	Youngstown, OH
Timmy Runtso	Defenseman	United States	19	Playa Vista, CA; selected 57th overall in 2026
Ryan Seelinger	Forward	United States	21	Downers Grove, Illinois
Branko Vukas	Defenseman	United States	19	Dyer, Indiana
Yegor Yegorov	Goalie	Russia	21	Moscow, Russia; selected 176th overall in 2023

== Roster ==
As of September 30, 2026.

No.	Nat.	Player	Class	Pos	Height	Weight	DoB	Hometown	Previous team	NHL rights
2	(United States)	Shaun McEwen	Sophomore	D	6' 1" (1.85 m)	182 lb (83 kg)		South Hadley, Massachusetts	Tri-City Storm (USHL)	—
4	(Canada)	Layne Loomer	Freshman	F	6' 0" (1.83 m)	193 lb (88 kg)		Lethbridge, Alberta	Lincoln Stars (USHL)	—
5	(United States)	Timmy Runtso	Freshman	D	6' 3" (1.91 m)	194 lb (88 kg)		Playa Vista, California	Victoria Royals (WHL)	MTL, 57th overall overall 2026
8	(United States)	John Emmons	Junior	F	6' 0" (1.83 m)	194 lb (88 kg)		Washington, Michigan	Minot Minotauros (NAHL)	—
9	(United States)	Jack Hamilton	Freshman	D	6' 5" (1.96 m)	207 lb (94 kg)		Columbus, Ohio	Youngstown Phantoms (USHL)	—
10	(United States)	Nicholas Mikan	Junior	F	6' 4" (1.93 m)	207 lb (94 kg)		Edina, Minnesota	St. Thomas (CCHA)	—
11	(United States)	David Helledy	Junior	D	6' 1" (1.85 m)	191 lb (87 kg)		Milwaukee, Wisconsin	Bentley (AHA)	—
12	(United States)	Chuck Blanchard	Freshman	F	6' 0" (1.83 m)	193 lb (88 kg)		West Hartford, Connecticut	Muskegon Lumberjacks (USHL)	—
13	(Canada)	Kocha Delic	Sophomore	F	5' 10" (1.78 m)	189 lb (86 kg)		Ottawa, Ontario	Sudbury Wolves (OHL)	—
14	(United States)	Ryan Smith	Junior	F	5' 10" (1.78 m)	180 lb (82 kg)		Pendleton, New York	Quinnipiac (ECAC)	—
17	(United States)	Cal Huston	Freshman	D	6' 1" (1.85 m)	198 lb (90 kg)		Youngstown, Ohio	Youngstown Phantoms (USHL)	—
18	(Russia)	Ilia Morozov	Sophomore	F	6' 3" (1.91 m)	204 lb (93 kg)		Moscow, Russia	Tri-City Storm (USHL)	BUF, 20th overall overall 2026
19	(United States)	Doug Grimes (C)	Senior	F	6' 3" (1.91 m)	213 lb (97 kg)		Brookline, Massachusetts	Boston University (HEA)	—
20	(United States)	David Deputy	Sophomore	F	5' 8" (1.73 m)	177 lb (80 kg)		Gurnee, Illinois	Muskegon Lumberjacks (USHL)	—
21	(United States)	Bradley Walker (A)	Sophomore	F	6' 1" (1.85 m)	192 lb (87 kg)		Orono, Minnesota	Waterloo Black Hawks (USHL)	—
22	(United States)	Branko Vukas	Freshman	D	6' 4" (1.93 m)	214 lb (97 kg)		Dyer, Indiana	Muskegon Lumberjacks (USHL)	—
23	(Czech Republic)	Matouš Kucharcík	Freshman	F	6' 4" (1.93 m)	193 lb (88 kg)		Prague, Czech Republic	Youngstown Phantoms (USHL)	BUF, 103rd overall overall 2025
27	(United States)	Austin Baker	Sophomore	F	6' 1" (1.85 m)	190 lb (86 kg)		White Lake, Michigan	Michigan State (Big Ten)	DET, 203rd overall overall 2024
29	(United States)	Benji Motew	Sophomore	G	5' 11" (1.8 m)	182 lb (83 kg)		Glencoe, Illinois	Corpus Christi IceRays (NAHL)	—
37	(United States)	Ryan Seelinger	Freshman	F	5' 11" (1.8 m)	184 lb (83 kg)		Downers Grove, Illinois	Des Moines Buccaneers (USHL)	—
43	(Canada)	Ryder Thompson	Sophomore	D	5' 11" (1.8 m)	187 lb (85 kg)		Russell, Manitoba	Portland Winterhawks (WHL)	—
45	(Canada)	Matteo Drobac	Junior	G	6' 2" (1.88 m)	205 lb (93 kg)		Oakville, Ontario	Western Ontario (OUA)	—
68	(Canada)	Ethan Hay (A)	Sophomore	F	6' 1" (1.85 m)	195 lb (88 kg)		Waterloo, Ontario	Kingston Frontenacs (OHL)	TBL, 211th overall overall 2023
71	(Russia)	Vladislav Lukashevich	Junior	D	6' 1" (1.85 m)	207 lb (94 kg)		Magadan, Russia	Michigan State (Big Ten)	FLA, 120th overall overall 2021
72	(Russia)	Yegor Yegorov	Freshman	G	6' 3" (1.91 m)	205 lb (93 kg)		Moscow, Russia	MHK Spartak Moskva (MHL)	CGY, 176th overall overall 2023
73	(United States)	Michael Phelan	Sophomore	D	5' 11" (1.8 m)	186 lb (84 kg)		Hinsdale, Illinois	Waterloo Black Hawks (USHL)	—
91	(Canada)	Matteo Giampa	Senior	F	6' 1" (1.85 m)	201 lb (91 kg)		Virgil, Ontario	Canisius (AHA)	—

== Standings ==
2026–27 National Collegiate Hockey Conference Standings
	Conference record										Overall record					
	GP	W	L	T	OTW	OTL	SW	PTS	GF	GA	GP	W	L	T	GF	GA
#5 Minnesota Duluth	6	4	2	0	0	0	0	12	16	9	14	9	3	2	47	22
#3 Denver	4	4	0	0	1	0	0	11	13	5	12	9	2	1	47	24
#7 North Dakota	4	3	0	1	0	0	0	10	14	5	11	7	3	1	40	25
#18 Miami	6	3	3	0	0	0	0	9	13	16	12	8	4	0	35	26
Omaha	6	2	3	1	1	0	1	8	16	17	10	4	5	1	30	29
#4 Western Michigan	4	2	1	1	1	0	1	7	12	10	11	8	2	1	52	21
Arizona State	4	1	3	0	0	1	0	4	7	11	10	5	5	0	33	32
#12 Colorado College	4	1	3	0	0	1	0	4	9	13	12	7	4	1	39	24
St. Cloud State	6	1	4	1	0	0	0	4	9	19	11	3	7	1	23	35
St. Thomas	4	1	3	0	0	0	0	3	7	11	10	4	6	0	25	29
Championship: March 19, 2027 † indicates conference regular season champion (Penrose Cup) * indicates conference tournament champion (National Cup); Rankings: USCHO.com Top 20 Poll; updated November 16, 2026

== Schedule and results ==
Date	Time	Opponent^{#}	Rank^{#}	Site	TV	Decision	Result	Attendance	Record
Regular Season
October 2	7:07 pm	at Northern Michigan*		Berry Events Center • Marquette, Michigan	Midco	Drobac	L 0–3	2,198	0–1–0
October 3	6:07 pm	at Northern Michigan*		Berry Events Center • Marquette, Michigan	Midco				
October 15	7:05 pm	Robert Morris*		Steve Cady Arena • Oxford, Ohio		{{{record}}}			
October 17	7 pm	at Robert Morris*		Clearview Arena • Moon Township, Pennsylvania					
October 23	7:05 pm	Alaska Anchorage*		Steve Cady Arena • Oxford, Ohio					
October 24	6:05 pm	Alaska Anchorage*		Steve Cady Arena • Oxford, Ohio					
October 30	7:05 pm	St. Thomas		Steve Cady Arena • Oxford, Ohio					
October 31	7:30 pm	St. Thomas		Steve Cady Arena • Oxford, Ohio					
November 6	8:07 pm	at Minnesota Duluth		AMSOIL Arena • Duluth, Minnesota					
November 7	7:07 pm	at Minnesota Duluth		AMSOIL Arena • Duluth, Minnesota					
November 13	7:05 pm	Omaha	#17	Steve Cady Arena • Oxford, Ohio					
November 14	6:05 pm	Omaha	#17	Steve Cady Arena • Oxford, Ohio					
November 20	9 pm	at #12 Colorado College	#18	Ed Robson Arena • Colorado Springs, Colorado					
November 21	8 pm	at #12 Colorado College	#18	Ed Robson Arena • Colorado Springs, Colorado					
November 27	7 pm	at Stonehill*		Warrior Ice Arena • Boston, Massachusetts					
November 28	7 pm	at Stonehill*		Warrior Ice Arena • Boston, Massachusetts					
December 4	7 pm	at Western Michigan		Lawson Arena • Kalamazoo, Michigan					
December 5	6 pm	at Western Michigan		Lawson Arena • Kalamazoo, Michigan					
January 1	7 pm	at Maine*		Alfond Arena • Orono, Maine					
January 2	7 pm	at Maine*		Alfond Arena • Orono, Maine					
January 8	7:05 pm	North Dakota		Steve Cady Arena • Oxford, Ohio					
January 9	6:05 pm	North Dakota		Steve Cady Arena • Oxford, Ohio					
January 15	8 pm	at St. Cloud State		Herb Brooks National Hockey Center • St. Cloud, Minnesota					
January 16	7 pm	at St. Cloud State		Herb Brooks National Hockey Center • St. Cloud, Minnesota					
January 22	7:05 pm	Arizona State		Steve Cady Arena • Oxford, Ohio					
January 23	6:05 pm	Arizona State		Steve Cady Arena • Oxford, Ohio					
February 5	8 pm	at St. Thomas		Lee & Penny Anderson Arena • Saint Paul, Minnesota					
February 6	7 pm	at St. Thomas		Lee & Penny Anderson Arena • Saint Paul, Minnesota					
February 12	7:05 pm	Denver		Steve Cady Arena • Oxford, Ohio					
February 13	6:05 pm	Denver		Steve Cady Arena • Oxford, Ohio					
February 19	8:07 pm	at North Dakota		Ralph Engelstad Arena • Grand Forks, North Dakota					
February 20	7:07 pm	at North Dakota		Ralph Engelstad Arena • Grand Forks, North Dakota					
February 26	7:05 pm	Western Michigan		Steve Cady Arena • Oxford, Ohio					
February 27	6:05 pm	Western Michigan		Steve Cady Arena • Oxford, Ohio					
*Non-conference game. ^{#}Rankings from USCHO.com Poll. All times are in Eastern Time. Source:

== Rankings ==
Ranking movements Legend: RV = Received votes
	Week
Poll	Pre
USCHO.com	RV
