= Frozen Tundra Hockey Classic =

College ice hockey game

Coordinates: 44.501341°N 88.062187°W

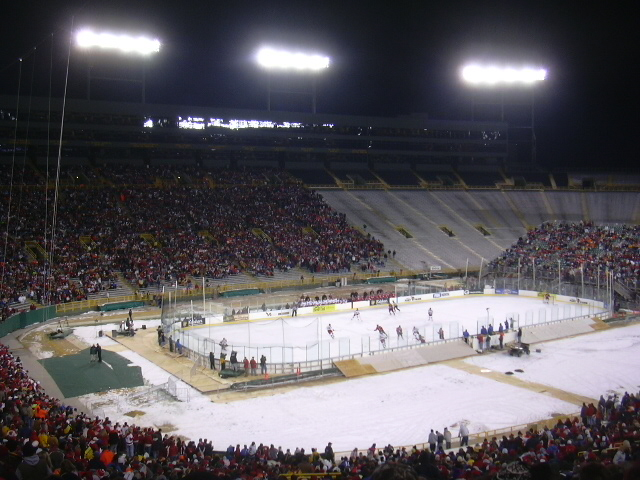
| | 1 | 2 | 3 | Total |
|---|---|---|---|---|
| Ohio State | 0 | 1 | 1 | 2 |
| Wisconsin | 1 | 1 | 2 | 4 |
- Date: February 11, 2006
- Venue: Lambeau Field
- City: Green Bay, Wisconsin
- Attendance: 40,890

The Frozen Tundra Hockey Classic was a college ice hockey game played on a makeshift ice rink covering the field at Lambeau Field in Green Bay, Wisconsin. The game was the second outdoor game involving US college teams, the first being "The Cold War".

The matchup pitted the men's ice hockey programs from the visiting Ohio State University Buckeyes and the host University of Wisconsin–Madison Badgers. At the time, Ohio State represented the now-defunct CCHA while Wisconsin was a member of the WCHA. Both programs now compete in the Big Ten Conference.

The Frozen Tundra Hockey Classic also served as the 2005 US Hockey Hall of Fame Game.

== Game summary ==
| February 11, 2006 | Wisconsin | 4–2 | Ohio State | Lambeau Field | Recap |

Scoring summary
| Period | Team | Goal | Assist(s) | Time | Score |
|---|---|---|---|---|---|
| 1st | WIS | Adam Burish (33) | Joe Pavelski (21) and Robbie Earl (21) | 00:23 | 1–0 WI |
| 2nd | OSU | Dave Barton (4) | Unassisted | 11:11 | 1–1 |
| 2nd | WIS | Kyle Klubertanz (4) – pp | Ross Carlson (9) and Ben Street (4) | 16:58 | 2–1 WIS |
| 3rd | WIS | Andrew Joudrey (7) | Ryan MacMurchy (13) and Jake Dowell (11) | 07:00 | 3–1 WIS |
| 3rd | OSU | Sam Campbell (4) | Bryce Anderson (7) and Tom Fritsche (16) | 16:58 | 3–2 WIS |
| 3rd | WIS | Robbie Earl (15) – en | Joe Piskula (9) | 19:02 | 4–2 WIS |
Penalty summary
| Period | Team | Player | Penalty | Time | PIM |
| 1st | OSU | Andrew Schembri | Cross-checking | 02:20 | 2:00 |
| 1st | WIS | Jake Dowell | Roughing | 09:17 | 2:00 |
| 1st | OSU | Nate Guenin (served by Zach Pelletier) | Hooking | 12:34 | 2:00 |
| 1st | OSU | Nate Guenin | Misconduct | 12:34 | 10:00 |
| 1st | WIS | Adam Burish | Slashing | 13:20 | 2:00 |
| 1st | OSU | Sean Collins | Cross-checking | 14:35 | 2:00 |
| 1st | WIS | A.J. Degenhardt | Interference | 14:49 | 2:00 |
| 1st | WIS | Davis Drewiske | Interference | 17:58 | 2:00 |
| 2nd | OSU | Rod Pelley | Slashing | 00:44 | 2:00 |
| 2nd | OSU | Matt Waddell | Hooking | 04:58 | 2:00 |
| 2nd | WIS | Joe Piskula | Cross-checking | 08:48 | 2:00 |
| 2nd | OSU | Andrew Schembri | Tripping | 13:23 | 2:00 |
| 2nd | OSU | Johann Kroll | Hooking | 15:54 | 2:00 |
| 2nd | WIS | Joe Piskula | Holding | 17:06 | 2:00 |
| 3rd | WIS | Matt Olinger | Interference | 07:25 | 2:00 |
| 3rd | OSU | Dan Knapp | Misconduct | 16:37 | 10:00 |
| 3rd | WIS | Davis Drewiske | Roughing – double minor | 19:23 | 4:00 |
| 3rd | WIS | Andy Brandt | Roughing – double minor | 19:23 | 4:00 |
| 3rd | OSU | Sam Campbell | Roughing – double minor | 19:23 | 4:00 |
| 3rd | OSU | Matt Waddell | Cross-checking | 19:23 | 2:00 |
| 3rd | OSU | Matt Waddell | Roughing – double minor | 19:23 | 4:00 |

Shots by period
| Team | 1 | 2 | 3 | Total |
|---|---|---|---|---|
| Wisconsin | 12 | 8 | 11 | 31 |
| Ohio State | 7 | 6 | 7 | 20 |

Power play opportunities
| Team | Goals/Opportunities |
|---|---|
| Wisconsin | 1/7 |
| Ohio State | 0/7 |
