= Westlake, Alberta =

Westlake
- Unincorporated community (Population centre)
- Location of Westlake in Alberta
- Coordinates: 55.218°N 118.808°W
- Country: Canada
- Province: Alberta
- Census division: No. 19
- Municipal district: County of Grande Prairie No. 1

Government
  - Type: Unincorporated
  - Reeve: Leanne Beaupre
  - Governing body: County of Grande Prairie No. 1 Council: Leanne Beaupre; Corey Beck; Daryl Beeston; Harold Bulford; Peter Harris; Bob Marshall; Karen Rosvold; Ross Sutherland; Linda Dianne Waddy

Area (2016)
  - Land: 3.27 km^{2} (1.26 sq mi)

Population (2016)
  - Total: 1,363
- Time zone: UTC−06:00 (Alberta Time)

Westlake is an unincorporated urban community within the County of Grande Prairie No. 1 in northwest Alberta, Canada that is designated a population centre for statistical purposes in the Canadian census. The community is located within the Hamlet of Clairmont and adjacent to the City of Grande Prairie to the south. Westlake is bound by Highway 43 to the east, Highway 43X to the north, Range Road 62 to the west and 140 Avenue to the south.

== Demographics ==
In the 2021 Census of Population, the urban population centre of Westlake, as delineated by Statistics Canada, recorded a population of 2,040 living in 635 of its 654 total private dwellings, a change of 49.7% from its 2016 population of 1,363. With a land area of 3.27 km^{2} (1.26 sq mi), it had a population density of 623.9/km^{2} (1,615.8/sq mi) in 2021.

In the 2016 Census of Population conducted by Statistics Canada, Westlake recorded a population of 1,363 living in 440 of its 470 total private dwellings, a 265.4% change from its 2011 population of 373. With a land area of 3.27 km^{2} (1.26 sq mi), it had a population density of 416.8/km^{2} (1,079.6/sq mi) in 2016.
