= US Hockey Hall of Fame Game =

Annual college hockey game

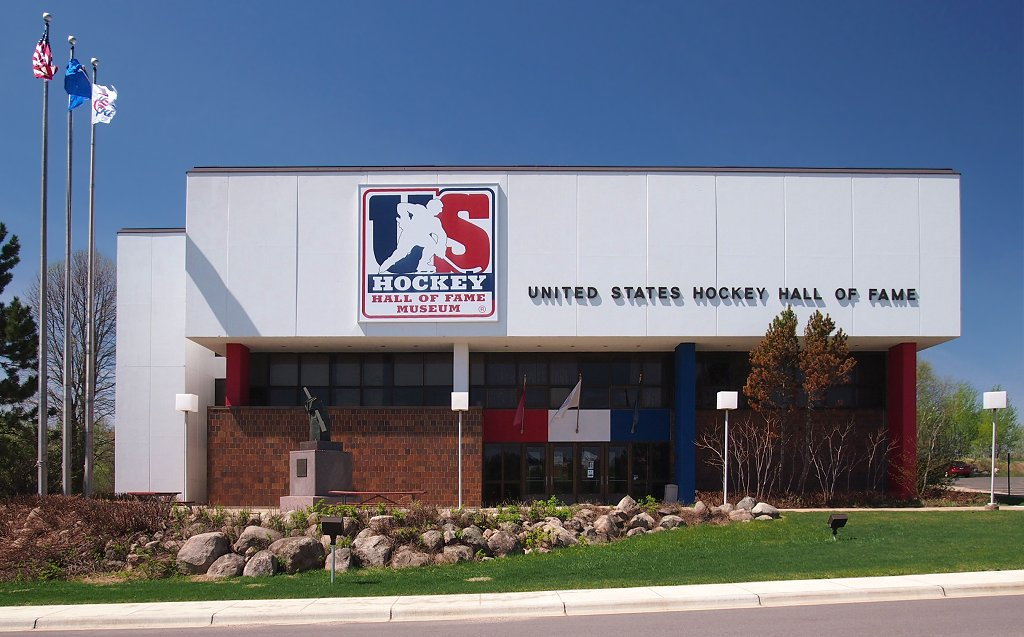
- The United States Hockey Hall of Fame
- Frequency: Annually
- Location: Varies
- Inaugurated: October 26, 1974; 52 years ago Minnesota 3, Minnesota Duluth 2
- Most recent: October 31, 2026; Michigan State 5, North Dakota 3
- Next event: TBA
- Organiser: United States Hockey Hall of Fame

The US Hockey Hall of Fame Game is an annual NCAA Division I men's ice hockey game sponsored by the United States Hockey Hall of Fame. First held in 1974 as part of induction ceremonies for the Hall's class of 1974, the game was held at the Eveleth Hippodrome in Eveleth, Minnesota for its first 19 years before moving to a variety of both campus and destination sites. The game has also been held for a number of special occasions, including the inaugural games held at 3M Arena at Mariucci, Ralph Engelstad Arena, and AMSOIL Arena, the Frozen Tundra Hockey Classic, and the Culver's Camp Randall Hockey Classic.

The US Hockey Hall of Fame Game is an exempt game, meaning it does not count towards the 34 regular-season game limit imposed on men's NCAA Division I hockey teams.

== Game Results ==
Date	Winning team	Losing team	Score	Venue	Ref.
October 26, 1974	Minnesota	Minnesota Duluth	3–2	Eveleth Hippodrome; Eveleth, MN	
October 25, 1975	Minnesota	USMNT	5–2	Eveleth Hippodrome; Eveleth, MN	
October 16, 1976	Minnesota	Minnesota Duluth	9–5	Eveleth Hippodrome; Eveleth, MN	
October 15, 1977	Minnesota Duluth	Notre Dame	5–2	Eveleth Hippodrome; Eveleth, MN	
October 21, 1978	Minnesota	North Dakota	5–3	Eveleth Hippodrome; Eveleth, MN	
October 20, 1979	USMNT	Minnesota Duluth	4–0	Eveleth Hippodrome; Eveleth, MN	
October 18, 1980	Minnesota	Michigan Tech	6–4	Eveleth Hippodrome; Eveleth, MN	
October 17, 1981	Michigan Tech	Minnesota Duluth	8–2	Eveleth Hippodrome; Eveleth, MN	
October 16, 1982	Minnesota	Northern Michigan	9–2	Eveleth Hippodrome; Eveleth, MN	
October 15, 1983	USMNT	Minnesota Duluth	10–0	Eveleth Hippodrome; Eveleth, MN	
October 6, 1984	Minnesota	Lake Superior State	6–1	Eveleth Hippodrome; Eveleth, MN	
October 5, 1985 (Note: The 1985 US Hockey Hall of Fame Game was a Minnesota Duluth intra-squad scrimmage.)	Minnesota Duluth Whites	Minnesota Duluth Maroons	5–2	Eveleth Hippodrome; Eveleth, MN	
October 4, 1986	Wisconsin	Minnesota Duluth	5–3	Eveleth Hippodrome; Eveleth, MN	
October 3, 1987	Minnesota	St. Cloud State	6–0	Eveleth Hippodrome; Eveleth, MN	
October 8, 1988	Minnesota Duluth	North Dakota	2–2*	Eveleth Hippodrome; Eveleth, MN	
October 14, 1989	Minnesota	Northern Michigan	6–4	Eveleth Hippodrome; Eveleth, MN	
October 6, 1990	Michigan Tech	Minnesota Duluth	2–2*	Eveleth Hippodrome; Eveleth, MN	
October 12, 1991	Northern Michigan	Minnesota	7–5	Eveleth Hippodrome; Eveleth, MN	
October 17, 1992	Minnesota Duluth	North Dakota	4–3	Eveleth Hippodrome; Eveleth, MN	
October 15, 1993	Michigan Tech	Minnesota	5–4	Mariucci Arena; Minneapolis, MN	
October 14, 1994	Wisconsin	Minnesota Duluth	6–4	DECC Arena; Duluth, MN	
October 26, 1995	Michigan	Maine	6–3	The Palace of Auburn Hills; Auburn Hills, MI	
October 12, 1996	Boston University	Minnesota	4–3	Target Center; Minneapolis, MN	
October 10, 1997	Michigan	Minnesota	3–2	Target Center; Minneapolis, MN	
October 3, 1998	Notre Dame	Wisconsin	2–1	Kohl Center; Madison, WI	
October 9, 1999	Colorado College	Michigan State	4–1	Colorado Springs World Arena; Colorado Springs, CO	
October 7, 2000	Minnesota	Notre Dame	7–3	Xcel Energy Center; St. Paul, MN	
October 5, 2001	Minnesota	North Dakota	7–5	Ralph Engelstad Arena; Grand Forks, ND	
October 12, 2002	Minnesota	Ohio State	7–2	Xcel Energy Center; St. Paul, MN	
October 4, 2003	North Dakota	Minnesota Duluth	3–2	Ralph Engelstad Arena; Grand Forks, ND	
October 9, 2004	Minnesota	Denver	5–2	Xcel Energy Center; St. Paul, MN	
February 11, 2006 (Note: The Frozen Tundra Hockey Classic also served as the 2005 US Hockey Hall of Fame Game.)	Wisconsin	Ohio State	4–2	Lambeau Field; Green Bay, WI	
October 7, 2006	Maine	Minnesota	3–1	Xcel Energy Center; St. Paul, MN	
October 13, 2007	North Dakota	Michigan State	6–0	Ralph Engelstad Arena; Grand Forks, ND	
October 11, 2008	Denver	Notre Dame	5–2	Magness Arena; Denver, CO	
February 6, 2010 (Note: The men's game of the Culver's Camp Randall Hockey Classic also served as the 2009 US Hockey Hall of Fame Game.)	Wisconsin	Michigan	3–2	Camp Randall Stadium; Madison, WI	
December 30, 2010	North Dakota	Minnesota Duluth	5–0	AMSOIL Arena; Duluth, MN	
January 7, 2012 (Note: The 2011 US Hockey Hall of Fame Game was played in January 2012.)	Notre Dame	Minnesota	4–3	Mariucci Arena; Minneapolis, MN	
December 29, 2012	Denver	Boston University	6–0	Magness Arena; Denver, CO	
December 14, 2013	Ferris State	Michigan State	2–0	Munn Ice Arena; East Lansing, MI	
November 1, 2014	North Dakota	Air Force	3–2	Ralph Engelstad Arena; Grand Forks, ND	
October 10, 2015	Vermont	Minnesota	3–0	Mariucci Arena; Minneapolis, MN	
October 15, 2016	North Dakota	RPI	5–2	Ralph Engelstad Arena; Grand Forks, ND	
October 1, 2017	Wisconsin	Michigan Tech	3–2	Kohl Center; Madison, WI	
October 27, 2018	North Dakota	Minnesota	3–1	Orleans Arena; Paradise, NV (Note: Labeled as Las Vegas in marketing materials.)	
November 2, 2019	North Dakota	Michigan Tech	3–1	Ralph Engelstad Arena; Grand Forks, ND	
~~October 17, 2020~~ (Note: The 2020 US Hockey Hall of Fame Game was originally scheduled to feature North Dakota and Penn State on October 17, 2020, at Bridgestone Arena in Nashville, TN. This matchup was postponed to October 30, 2021 due to the COVID-19 pandemic, with a replacement Hall of Fame Game set to be played on the original date at Ralph Engelstad Arena in Grand Forks, ND. Due to the delayed start of the 2020–21 NCAA Division I men's ice hockey season, there was ultimately no 2020 game.)	Cancelled due to COVID-19 pandemic and delayed start of season.				
October 30, 2021	Penn State	North Dakota	6–4	Bridgestone Arena; Nashville, TN	
October 29, 2022	Arizona State	North Dakota	3–2	T-Mobile Arena; Paradise, NV (Note: Labeled as Las Vegas in marketing materials.)	
October 7, 2023	Minnesota Duluth	Michigan Tech	2–2* (Note: While the game officially ended in a tie, Minnesota Duluth won a shootout.)	AMSOIL Arena; Duluth, MN	
October 12, 2024	North Dakota	Providence	3–2	Ralph Engelstad Arena; Grand Forks, ND	
November 29, 2025	Minnesota	Denver	6–5	Ball Arena; Denver, CO	
October 31, 2026	Michigan State	North Dakota	5–3	H-E-B Center at Cedar Park; Cedar Park, TX (Note: Labeled as Austin in marketing materials.)	

* indicates that game ended in a tie.

== Appearances and Record by Team ==
School	Appearances	Record	Win %
Minnesota	1974, 1975, 1976, 1978, 1980, 1982, 1984, 1987, 1989, 1991, 1993, 1996, 1997, 2000, 2001, 2002, 2004, 2006, 2011, 2015, 2018, 2025	14–8–0	.636
Minnesota Duluth	1974, 1976, 1977, 1979, 1981, 1983, 1985, 1986, 1988, 1990, 1992, 1994, 2003, 2010, 2023	2–9–3 (Note: Excluding 1985 intra-squad scrimmage.)	.250
North Dakota	1978, 1988, 1992, 2001, 2003, 2007, 2010, 2014, 2016, 2018, 2019, 2021, 2022, 2024, 2026	8–6–1	.567
Michigan Tech	1980, 1981, 1990, 1993, 2017, 2019, 2023	2–3–2	.429
Wisconsin	1986, 1994, 1998, 2005, 2009, 2017	5–1–0	.833
Notre Dame	1977, 1998, 2000, 2008, 2011	2–3–0	.400
Denver	2004, 2008, 2012, 2025	2–2–0	.500
Michigan State	1999, 2007, 2013, 2026	1–3–0	.250
Michigan	1995, 1997, 2009	2–1–0	.667
Northern Michigan	1982, 1989, 1991	1–2–0	.333
USMNT	1975, 1979, 1983	2–1–0	.667
Boston University	1996, 2012	1–1–0	.500
Maine	1995, 2006	1–1–0	.500
Ohio State	2002, 2005	0–2–0	.000
Air Force	2014	0–1–0	.000
Arizona State	2022	1–0–0	1.000
Colorado College	1999	1–0–0	1.000
Ferris State	2013	1–0–0	1.000
Lake Superior State	1984	0–1–0	.000
Minnesota Duluth Maroons	1985	0–1–0	.000
Minnesota Duluth Whites	1985	1–0–0	1.000
Penn State	2021	1–0–0	1.000
Providence	2024	0–1–0	.000
RPI	2016	0–1–0	.000
St. Cloud State	1987	0–1–0	.000
Vermont	2015	1–0–0	1.000

== Multiple Meetings ==
Teams	Meetings	Series
Minnesota Duluth vs. North Dakota	1988, 1992, 2003, 2010	North Dakota leads, 2–1–1
Michigan Tech vs. Minnesota Duluth	1981, 1990, 2023	Michigan Tech leads, 1–0–2
Minnesota vs. North Dakota	1978, 2001, 2018	Minnesota leads, 2–1–0
Minnesota vs. Northern Michigan	1982, 1989, 1991	Minnesota leads, 2–1–0
Denver vs. Minnesota	2004, 2025	Minnesota leads, 2–0–0
Michigan State vs. North Dakota	2007, 2026	Series tied, 1–1–0
Minnesota vs. Michigan Tech	1980, 1993	Series tied, 1–1–0
Minnesota vs. Minnesota Duluth	1974, 1976	Minnesota leads, 2–0–0
Minnesota vs. Notre Dame	2000, 2011	Series tied, 1–1–0
Minnesota Duluth vs. USMNT	1979, 1983	USMNT leads, 2–0–0
Minnesota Duluth vs. Wisconsin	1986, 1994	Wisconsin leads, 2–0–0

== Host cities ==
The Eveleth Hippodrome, site of the first 19 US Hockey Hall of Fame games.

City	Number	Years hosted
Eveleth, MN	19	1974, 1975, 1976, 1977, 1978, 1979, 1980, 1981, 1982, 1983, 1984, 1985, 1986, 1987, 1988, 1989, 1990, 1991, 1992
Grand Forks, ND	7	2001, 2003, 2007, 2014, 2016, 2019, 2024
Minneapolis, MN	5	1993, 1996, 1997, 2011, 2015
St. Paul, MN	4	2000, 2002, 2004, 2006
Denver, CO	3	2008, 2012, 2025
Duluth, MN	3	1994, 2010, 2023
Madison, WI	3	1998, 2009, 2017
Paradise, NV	2	2018, 2022
Auburn Hills, MI	1	1995
Cedar Park, TX	1	2026
Colorado Springs, CO	1	1999
East Lansing, MI	1	2013
Green Bay, WI	1	2005
Nashville, TN	1	2021
