= 2015 WCHA men's ice hockey tournament =

2015 WCHA Men's ice hockey tournament
- Dates: March 13–21, 2015
- Teams: 8
- Finals site: Xcel Energy Center; St. Paul, Minnesota
- Champions: Minnesota State (2nd title)
- Winning coach: Mike Hastings (2nd title)
- MVP: Brad McClure (Minnesota State)
- WCHA Men's Ice Hockey Tournaments

The 2015 WCHA Men's Ice Hockey Tournament was the 56th conference playoff in league history and 61st season where a WCHA champion was crowned. The 2014 tournament was played between March 13 and March 21, 2015, at four conference arenas and the Xcel Energy Center in St. Paul, Minnesota. By winning the tournament, Minnesota State was awarded the Broadmoor Trophy and received the WCHA's automatic bid to the 2015 NCAA Division I Men's Ice Hockey Tournament.

== Format ==
The first round of the postseason tournament features a best-of-three games format. The top eight or ten conference teams participate in the tournament. Teams are seeded No. 1 through No. 8 according to their final conference standing, with a tiebreaker system used to seed teams with an identical number of points accumulated. The top four seeded teams each earn home ice and host one of the lower seeded teams.

The winners of the first round series advance to the Xcel Energy Center for the WCHA Final Five, a holdover from previous tournaments where it was used as the collective name of the quarterfinal, semifinal, and championship rounds. The Final Five uses a single-elimination format. Teams are re-seeded No. 1 through No. 4 according to the final regular season conference standings.

=== Conference standings ===
Note: GP = Games played; W = Wins; L = Losses; T = Ties; PTS = Points; GF = Goals For; GA = Goals Against

2014–15 Western Collegiate Hockey Association standings
| | Conference record | | | | | | | Overall record | | | | | |
| | GP | W | L | T | PTS | GF | GA | GP | W | L | T | GF | GA |
|---|---|---|---|---|---|---|---|---|---|---|---|---|---|
| #7 Minnesota State †* | 28 | 21 | 4 | 3 | 45 | 98 | 47 | 40 | 29 | 8 | 3 | 145 | 77 |
| #9 Michigan Tech | 28 | 21 | 5 | 2 | 44 | 103 | 48 | 41 | 29 | 10 | 2 | 144 | 74 |
| #18 Bowling Green | 28 | 17 | 8 | 3 | 37 | 87 | 66 | 39 | 23 | 11 | 5 | 119 | 93 |
| Alaska^ | 28 | 14 | 12 | 2 | 30 | 75 | 69 | 34 | 19 | 13 | 2 | 92 | 81 |
| Bemidji State | 28 | 12 | 11 | 5 | 29 | 73 | 62 | 38 | 16 | 17 | 5 | 101 | 90 |
| Ferris State | 28 | 13 | 14 | 1 | 27 | 66 | 58 | 40 | 18 | 20 | 2 | 88 | 88 |
| Northern Michigan | 28 | 11 | 13 | 4 | 26 | 59 | 71 | 38 | 14 | 18 | 6 | 86 | 100 |
| Alabama–Huntsville | 28 | 7 | 20 | 1 | 15 | 44 | 95 | 38 | 8 | 26 | 4 | 62 | 121 |
| Lake Superior State | 28 | 7 | 20 | 1 | 15 | 44 | 91 | 38 | 8 | 28 | 2 | 60 | 131 |
| Alaska Anchorage | 28 | 5 | 21 | 2 | 12 | 52 | 94 | 34 | 8 | 22 | 4 | 70 | 107 |
Championship: March 21, 2015 † indicates conference regular season champion (MacNaughton Cup); * indicates conference tournament champion (Broadmoor Trophy)^ indicates ineligible for postseason play due to NCAA sanctions Rankings: USCHO.com Top 20 Poll; updated March 9, 2015

== Bracket ==
Teams are reseeded after the first round

First round March 13–15
1 | Minnesota State | 9 | 4 | —
8 | Lake Superior State | 2 | 2 | —
2 | Michigan Tech | 1*** | 3 | —
7 | Alabama–Huntsville | 0 | 0 | —
(Pairings are reseeded after the first round)
3 | Bowling Green | 3* | 4 | —
6 | Northern Michigan | 2 | 1 | —
4 | Bemidji State | 1 | 2 | —
5 | Ferris State | 4 | 3*** | —

Semifinals; March 20
1 | Minnesota State | 4
5 | Ferris State | 0
2 | Michigan Tech | 5
3 | Bowling Green | 2

Championship; March 21
1 | Minnesota State | 5
2 | Michigan Tech | 2

Note: * denotes overtime periods

== Results ==
=== First round ===
All times are local.

==== (1) Minnesota State vs. (8) Lake Superior State ====
| March 13, 2015; 7:00 pm CDT | (8) Lake Superior State | 2 – 9 (1–2, 1–4, 0–3) | (1) Minnesota State | Verizon Wireless Center, Mankato, MN; Attendance: 3,325 |

Game reference

Gordon Defiel (40:00)
Aaron Davis (20:00)
Goalies
Stephon Williams
Referees:
Keith Sergott
Kevin Langseth
Linesmen:
Matt Anderson
Rick Nelson

| | 0 – 1 | 9:12 – pp - Max Gaede (Jutzi, J. Nelson) |
| Stephen Perfetto – 10:14 | 1 – 1 |
| | 1 – 2 | 16:08 - pp - Bryce Gervais (Lafontaine, Leitner) |
| Gus Correale (Drapluk, Renz) - pp - 1:06 | 2 – 2 |
| | 2 – 3 | 5:18 - Casey Nelson |
| | 2 – 4 | 7:35 - Brett Knowles (J. Nelson, Gaede) |
| | 2 – 5 | 13:30 - pp - Matt Leitner (Franklin, C. Nelson) |
| | 2 – 6 | 17:23 - pp - Matt Leitner (Lafontaine, Gervais) |
| | 2 – 7 | 1:01 - Chase Grant (Lafontaine, Blueger) |
| | 2 – 8 | 5:32 - pp - Dylan Margonari (Flanagan) |
| | 2 – 9 | 12:42 - pp - Jean-Paul Lafontaine (Jutzi, Knowles) |

30 min
Penalties
6 min
18
Shots
59

| March 14, 2015; 7:00 pm CDT | (8) Lake Superior State | 2 – 4 (0–1, 1–1, 1–2) | (1) Minnesota State | Verizon Wireless Center, Mankato, MN; Attendance: 3,685 |

Game reference

Gordon Defiel
Goalies
Stephon Williams
Referees:
Keith Sergott
Kevin Langseth
Linesmen:
Matt Anderson
Rick Nelson

| | 0 – 1 | 3:21 - Bryce Gervais (Franklin, Leitner) |
| | 0 – 2 | 2:24 - Dylan Margonari (Stepan, Flanagan) |
| Ryan Renz (Drapluk, Perfetto) - pp - 12:59 | 1 – 2 |
| | 1 – 3 | 0:46 - pp - Brad McClure (Palmquist, C. Nelson) |
| Austin McKay (Patterson, Spratte) - 7:29 | 2 – 3 |
| | 2 – 4 | 17:46 - Dylan Margonari (McClure) |

12 min
Penalties
6 min
22
Shots
36

==== (2) Michigan Tech vs. (7) Alabama–Huntsville ====
| March 13, 2015; 7:00 pm EDT | (7) Alabama–Huntsville | 0 – 1 (3OT) (0–0, 0–0, 0–0, 0–0, 0–0, 0–1) | (2) Michigan Tech | MacInnes Student Ice Arena, Houghton, MI; Attendance: 3,038 |

Game reference
| Carmine Guerriero | Goalies | Jamie Phillips | Referees: Brad Albers; Brett Klosowski; Linesmen: Dan Juopperi; Jamie Grace |
| 0 – 1 / 18:49 - Tyler Heinonen (Vallis, Auk) | | | Referees: Brad Albers; Brett Klosowski; Linesmen: Dan Juopperi; Jamie Grace |
| 29 min | Penalties | 12 min | Referees: Brad Albers; Brett Klosowski; Linesmen: Dan Juopperi; Jamie Grace |
| 32 | Shots | 77 | Referees: Brad Albers; Brett Klosowski; Linesmen: Dan Juopperi; Jamie Grace |

| March 14, 2015; 7:00 pm EDT | (7) Alabama–Huntsville | 0 – 3 (0–1, 0–1, 0–1) | (2) Michigan Tech | MacInnes Student Ice Arena, Houghton, MI; Attendance: 3,629 |

Game reference

Carmine Guerriero
Goalies
Jamie Phillips
Referees:
Brad Albers
Brett Klosowski
Linesmen:
Dan Juopperi
Jamie Grace

| 0 – 1 | 14:35 - Blake Hietala (Kero, Heinonen) |
| 0 – 2 | 4:43 - pp - Tanner Kero (Heinonen, Hietala) |
| 0 – 3 | 5:45 - Mark Auk |

14 min
Penalties
6 min
18
Shots
45

==== (3) Bowling Green vs. (6) Northern Michigan ====
| March 13, 2015; 7:00 pm EDT | (6) Northern Michigan | 2 – 3 (OT) (0–0, 1–0, 1–2, 0–1) | (3) Bowling Green | BGSU Ice Arena, Bowling Green, OH; Attendance: 1,475 |

Game reference

Michael Doan
Goalies
Tommy Burke
Referees:
Chris Perrault
Tony Czech
Linesmen:
Paul Tunison
Erik Froberg

| Shane Sooth (Shine, Seckel) - 7:17 | 1 – 0 |
| | 1 – 1 | 10:48 - Mitchell McLain (Pohlkamp, Kucera) |
| Luke Eibler (Sooth) - 16:29 | 2 – 1 |
| | 2 – 2 | 18:36 - Mark Cooper (Valleau) |
| | 2 – 3 | 19:32 - Tyler Spezia (DeSalvo, Berkle) |

20 min
Penalties
19 min
40
Shots
52

| March 14, 2015; 7:00 pm EDT | (6) Northern Michigan | 1 – 4 (0–0, 1–2, 0–2) | (3) Bowling Green | BGSU Ice Arena, Bowling Green, OH; Attendance: 1,915 |

Game reference

Michael Doan
Goalies
Tommy Burke
Referees:
Chris Perrault
Tony Czech
Linesmen:
Paul Tunison
Erik Froberg

| Zach Diamantoni (Nowick, Payne) - 8:55 | 1 – 0 |
| | 1 – 1 | 9:59 - Tyler Spezia (DeSalvo, Walker) |
| | 1 – 2 | 14:17 - Brandon Hawkins (Cooper) |
| | 1 – 3 | 13:24 - Brandon Hawkins (Walker, Cooper) |
| | 1 – 4 | 18:52 - pp - Brent Tate (Berkle, Valleau) |

49 min
Penalties
8 min
20
Shots
42

==== (4) Bemidji State vs. (5) Ferris State ====
| March 13, 2015; 7:30 pm CDT | (5) Ferris State | 4 – 1 (1–0, 2–0, 1–1) | (4) Bemidji State | Sanford Center, Bemidji, MN; Attendance: 2,218 |

Game reference

C. J. Motte
Goalies
Michael Bitzer
Referees:
Butch Mousseaux
Pete Friesema
Linesmen:
Matt Tyree
Matt Ulwilling

| Zach Szajner (Mayer, Maloney) - 11:04 | 1 – 0 |
| Ryan Lowney (Dorantes, Mayhew) - 15:07 | 2 – 0 |
| Gerald Mayhew (Panetta) - 17:29 | 3 – 0 |
| | 3 – 1 | 13:24 - pp - Gerry Fitzgerald (L. Fitzgerald, Arentz) |
| Kenny Babinski (Buzzeo, McDonald) - en - 17:49 | 4 – 1 |

6 min
Penalties
6 min
19
Shots
22

| March 14, 2015; 7:00 pm CDT | (5) Ferris State | 3 – 2 (3 OT) (1–0, 0–1, 1–1, 0–0, 0–0, 1–0) | (4) Bemidji State | Sanford Center, Bemidji, MN; Attendance: 2,279 |

Game reference

C. J. Motte
Goalies
Michael Bitzer
Referees:
Butch Mousseaux
Pete Friesema
Linesmen:
Matt Tyree
Matt Ulwilling

| Andrew Dorantes (Anselmini, Binkley) - pp - 15:17 | 1 – 0 |
| | 1 – 1 | 12:48 - Graeme McCormack (Brewer, Bauman) |
| Justin Buzzeo (Babinski) - 6:00 | 2 – 1 |
| | 2 – 2 | 11:23 - Brendan Harms (Beauvais, O'Connor) |
| Kyle Schempp (Lowney, Robertson) - pp - 6:40 | 3 – 2 |

14 min
Penalties
6 min
44
Shots
50

=== Semifinals ===
All times are local (UTC−5).

==== (3) Bowling Green vs. (2) Michigan Tech ====
| March 20, 2015; 4:00 pm CDT | (3) Bowling Green | 2 – 5 (1–2, 0–0, 1–3) | (2) Michigan Tech | Xcel Energy Center, St. Paul, MN; Attendance: 6,844 |

Game reference

Tommy Burke
Goalies
Jamie Phillips
Referees:
Butch Mousseaux
Pete Friesema
Linesmen:
Paul Tunison
Eric Froberg

| Mitchell McLain (Mercier, Burke) - 9:40 | 1 – 0 |
| | 1 – 1 | 11:29 - Reid Sturos (Auk, Pietila) |
| | 1 – 2 | 16:49 - Tyler Heinonen (Johnstone, Watson) |
| Brent Tate (Mingo, Walker) - 2:16 | 2 – 2 |
| | 2 – 3 | 5:23 - Tyler Heinonen (Johnstone, Neville) |
| | 2 – 4 | 7:54 - Michael Neville (Auk, Johnstone) |
| | 2 – 5 | 18:12 - en - Joel L'Esperance (Heinonen) |

2 min
Penalties
6 min
24
Shots
32

==== (5) Ferris State vs. (1) Minnesota State ====
| March 20, 2015; 7:30 pm CDT | (5) Ferris State | 0 – 4 (0–1, 0–2, 0–1) | (1) Minnesota State | Xcel Energy Center, St. Paul, MN; Attendance: 6,844 |

Game reference

C. J. Motte
Goalies
Stephon Williams
Referees:
Kevin Langseth
Chris Perrault
Linesmen:
Matt Ulwelling
Matt Tyree

| 0 – 1 | 12:24 - Brad McClure |
| 0 – 2 | 15:18 - Brad McClure (C. Nelson, Jutzi) |
| 0 – 3 | 18:16 - pp - C. J. Franklin (McClure, Williams) |
| 0 – 4 | 17:57 - en - Bryce Gervais |

10 min
Penalties
8 min
25
Shots
25

=== Championship ===
All times are local (UTC−5).

==== (2) Michigan Tech vs. (1) Minnesota State ====
| March 21, 2015; 6:00 pm CDT | (2) Michigan Tech | 2 – 5 (1–1, 1–0, 0–4) | (1) Minnesota State | Xcel Energy Center, St. Paul, MN; Attendance: 8,204 |

Game reference

Jamie Phillips
Goalies
Stephon Williams
Referees:
Kevin Langseth
Chris Perrault
Linesmen:
Matt Ulwelling
Matt Tyree

| Blake Pietila (Johnstone, Hanna) - pp - 6:04 | 1 – 0 |
| | 1 – 1 | 9:28 - Chase Grant (Stern, Blueger) |
| Alex Petan (Hanna, Johnstone) - pp - 2:44 | 2 – 1 |
| | 2 – 2 | 8:08 - Jordan Nelson (Huntebrinker, Stern) |
| | 2 – 3 | 11:29 - Brad McClure (Huntebrinker, Palmquist) |
| | 2 – 4 | 14:25 - pp - Brad McClure (Blueger, Jutzi) |
| | 2 – 5 | 18:40 - pp - Brad McClure (Palmquist, Flanagan) |

14 min
Penalties
6 min
25
Shots
28

== Tournament awards ==
=== All-Tournament Team ===
- F Tyler Heinonen, So. (Michigan Tech)
- F David Johnstone, Sr. (Michigan Tech)
- F Brad McClure*, Fr. (Minnesota State)
- D Zach Palmquist, Sr. (Minnesota State)
- D Brett Stern, Sr. (Minnesota State)
- G Stephon Williams, Jr. (Minnesota State)

* Most Valuable Player
