= 2017 WCHA men's ice hockey tournament =

Sports tournament

2017 WCHA Men's ice hockey tournament
- Dates: March 3–18, 2017
- Teams: 8
- Finals site: MacInnes Student Ice Arena; Houghton, Michigan
- Champions: Michigan Tech (10th title)
- Winning coach: Mel Pearson (1st title)
- Most Outstanding Player: Shane Hanna (Michigan Tech)
- WCHA Men's Ice Hockey Tournaments

The 2017 WCHA Men's Ice Hockey Tournament was the 58th conference playoff in league history and 63rd season where a WCHA champion was crowned. The 2017 tournament was played between March 3 and March 18, 2017, at four conference arenas, with the championship game being hosted by Michigan Tech at their home rink, MacInnes Student Ice Arena. By winning the tournament, Michigan Tech was awarded the Broadmoor Trophy and received the WCHA's automatic bid to the 2017 NCAA Division I Men's Ice Hockey Tournament.

== Format ==
The first two rounds of the postseason tournament features a best-of-three games format. The top eight conference teams participate in the tournament. Teams are seeded No. 1 through No. 8 according to their final conference standing, with a tiebreaker system used to seed teams with an identical number of points accumulated. The higher seeded teams each earn home ice and host one of the lower seeded teams.

The final was a single game held at the campus site of the highest remaining seed.

=== Conference standings ===
Note: GP = Games played; W = Wins; L = Losses; T = Ties; PTS = Points; GF = Goals For; GA = Goals Against

2016–17 Western Collegiate Hockey Association standings
	Conference record								Overall record					
	GP	W	L	T	SOW	PTS	GF	GA	GP	W	L	T	GF	GA
Bemidji State†	28	20	6	2	2	64	71	44	41	22	16	3	94	79
#19 Michigan Tech*	28	15	7	6	3	54	80	59	45	23	15	7	131	100
Minnesota State	28	15	9	4	2	51	89	68	39	22	13	4	119	95
Bowling Green	28	14	13	1	1	44	79	65	41	21	18	2	120	102
Ferris State	28	12	12	4	2	42	78	74	37	13	19	5	95	101
Alaska	28	11	13	4	3	40	67	84	36	12	20	4	79	113
Lake Superior State	28	8	13	7	4	35	78	87	36	11	18	7	103	119
Northern Michigan	28	10	15	3	1	34	69	75	39	13	22	4	93	108
Alabama–Huntsville	28	9	16	3	0	30	68	95	34	9	22	3	74	120
Alaska Anchorage	28	6	16	6	2	26	52	80	34	7	21	6	59	102
Championship: March 18, 2017 † indicates conference regular season champion (MacNaughton Cup); * indicates conference tournament champion (Broadmoor Trophy); Rankings: USCHO.com Top 20 Poll; updated March 6, 2017

== Bracket ==
Teams are reseeded after the first round

Quarterfinals; March 3–5
1	Bemidji State	3	2	3
8	Northern Michigan	0	4	1
2	Michigan Tech	6	8	—
7	Lake Superior State	4	0	—
3	Minnesota State	3	4	—
6	Alaska	0	1	—
4	Bowling Green	6	5	—
5	Ferris State	1	3	—

Semifinals; March 10–12
1	Bemidji State	3	1	—
4	Bowling Green	4*	2	—
2	Michigan Tech	5	0	4
3	Minnesota State	1	1	1

Championship; March 18
2	Michigan Tech	3**
4	Bowling Green	2

Note: * denotes overtime periods

== Results ==
=== Quarterfinals ===
==== (1) Bemidji State vs. (8) Northern Michigan ====
March 3	Bemidji State	3–0	Northern Michigan	Sanford Center	Recap
No Scoring		First period	No scoring
(G. Fitzgerald, Harms) Leo Fitzgerald (6) - GW - 01:22 (Marinaccio, G. Fitzgerald) Zach Whitecloud (3) - PP - 08:20 (Marinaccio, Baudry) Kyle Bauman (13) - 12:36		Second period	No scoring
No scoring		Third period	No scoring
( 30 saves / 30 shots ) Michael Bitzer		Goalie stats	Atte Tolvanen ( 24 saves / 27 shots )

March 4	Bemidji State	2–4	Northern Michigan	Sanford Center	Recap
No Scoring		First period	17:25 - Shane Sooth (5) (Hanson, Shine)
(Harms) Nate Arentz (6) - SH - 01:32		Second period	01:04 - PP - Gerard Hanson (7) (Hannoun, Shine); 17:25 - GW PP - Dominik Shine (19) (Hanson, Sooth)
(Muck, G. Fitzgerald) Dan Billett (2) - GW - 13:37		Third period	18:27 - EN - Dominik Shine (20) (Hanson, Yaremko)
( 17 saves / 20 shots ) Michael Bitzer		Goalie stats	Atte Tolvanen ( 46 saves / 48 shots )

March 5	Bemidji State	3–1	Northern Michigan	Sanford Center	Recap
(Arentz, Muck) Myles Fitzgerald (5) - 05:18 (L. Fitzgerald, G. Fitzgerald) Brendan Harms (8) - GW - 05:52		First period	No scoring
No scoring		Second period	17:40 - PP - Brock Maschmeyer (5) (Shine, Payne)
(unassisted) Phillip Marinaccio (10) - EN - 19:42		Third period	No scoring
( 19 saves / 20 shots ) Michael Bitzer		Goalie stats	Atte Tolvanen ( 25 saves / 27 shots )

Bemidji State wins series 2–1

==== (2) Michigan Tech vs. (7) Lake Superior State ====
March 3	Michigan Tech	6–4	Lake Superior State	MacInnes Student Ice Arena	Recap
(L'Esperance, Watson) Alex Smith (7) - 03:34 (Hanna, Jackson) Reid Sturos (9) - 04:54 (L'Esperance, Watson) Alex Gillies (5) - 09:35 (Hanna, Lucchini) Mitch Reinke (6) - PP - 10:53 (Sturos, Neville) Jake Jackson (7) - GW - 11:33		First period	07:28 - Mitch Hults (11) (Saccoman, Bindulis); 15:36 - PP - Luke Morgan (7) (Hults, Cuglietta)
(Neville, Sturos) Jake Jackson (8) - 01:19		Second period	No scoring
No scoring		Third period	03:47 - Gage Torrel (14) (Hults, Bindulis); 05:12 - Gus Correale (6) (Hults)
( 14 saves / 17 shots ) Angus Redmond / ( 0 saves / 1 shots ) Matt Wintjes		Goalie stats	Gordon Defiel ( 14 saves / 20 shots ) / Nick Kossoff ( 31 saves / 31 shots )

March 4	Michigan Tech	8–0	Lake Superior State	MacInnes Student Ice Arena	Recap
(Jackson, Watson) Reid Sturos (10) - GW - 03:30 (Roy, Auk) Joel L'Esperance (9) - PP - 18:38		First period	No scoring
(Sturos, Hanna) Mike Neville (6) - SH - 08:34		Second period	No scoring
(Neville, Roy) Shane Hanna (7) - 01:42 (Roy, Auk) Gavin Gould (7) - PP - 05:49 (L'Esperance, Smith) Mark Auk (4) - PP - 11:56 (Gould) Chris Leibinger (8) - 12:08 (Heinonen, Lucchini) Joel L'Esperance (10) - 19:48		Third period	No scoring
( 16 saves / 16 shots ) Angus Redmond		Goalie stats	Gordon Defiel ( 30 saves / 38 shots )

Michigan Tech wins series 2–0

==== (3) Minnesota State vs. (6) Alaska ====
March 3	Minnesota State	3–0	Alaska	Verizon Wireless Center	Recap
(Foguth, Stepan) Sean Flanagan (5) - GW - 02:05 (Huntebrinker, Flanagan) Parker Tuomie (7) - PP - 12:47		First period	No scoring
(Nelson, Flanagan) Parker Tuomie (8) - 15:15		Second period	No scoring
No scoring		Third period	No scoring
( 23 saves / 23 shots ) Jason Pawloski		Goalie stats	Davis Jones ( 30 saves / 33 shots )

March 4	Minnesota State	4–1	Alaska	Verizon Wireless Center	Recap
(Tuomie, Coatta) Jordan Nelson (4) - 09:51		First period	No scoring
(Brickley, Franklin) Zeb Knutson (14) - GW PP - 08:24		Second period	No scoring
(Nelson) Max Coatta (5) - 15:10 (Brickley, Tuomie) Max Coatta (6) - EN - 19:45		Third period	03:47 - Ross Heidt (14) (Frye, Thompson)
( 29 saves / 30 shots ) Jason Pawloski		Goalie stats	Davis Jones ( 33 saves / 36 shots )

Minnesota State wins series 2-0

==== (4) Bowling Green vs. (5) Ferris State ====
March 3	Bowling Green	6–1	Ferris State	Slater Family Ice Arena	Recap
(Spezia, Walker) Matt Pohlkamp (9) - 06:46 (Mercier, Friedman) Stephen Baylis (3) - GW - 09:15		First period	12:47 - PP - Jared VanWormer (9) (McDonald, Mayhew)
(D'Andrea, Spezia) Matt Pohlkamp (10) - PP - 02:58 (Pohlkamp) Sean Walker (10) - GW - 03:50 (McLain, Pohlkamp) Alec Rauhauser (4) - 05:49 (Walker, D'Andrea) Lukas Craggs (7) - 17:47		Second period	No scoring
No scoring		Third period	No scoring
( 27 saves / 28 shots ) Chris Nell		Goalie stats	Justin Kapelmaster ( 9 saves / 11 shots ) / Darren Smith ( 18 saves / 22 shots )

March 4	Bowling Green	5–3	Ferris State	Slater Family Ice Arena	Recap
(Pohlkamp, Smith) Joe McKeown (1) - 03:39		First period	No scoring
(Dufour, Pohlkamp) Pierre-Luc Mercier (6) - PP - 01:23		Second period	11:48 - PP - Mitch Maloney (9) (Mayhew, Dorantes)
(McLain, Mercier) Kevin Dufour (14) - 17:12 (Mercier, Walker) Alec Rauhauser (5) - GW PP - 17:48 (Pohlkamp, Friedman) Tyler Spezia (8) - PP EN - 19:26		Third period	11:20 - PP - Jason Tackett (4) (Dorantes, Rutkowski); 12:24 - Trevor Recktenwald (4) (Hetz)
( 27 saves / 30 shots ) Chris Nell		Goalie stats	Darren Smith ( 24 saves / 28 shots )

Bowling Green wins series 2–0

=== Semifinals ===
==== (1) Bemidji State vs. (4) Bowling Green ====
March 10	Bemidji State	3–4	OT	Bowling Green	Sanford Center	Recap
(Bauman, O'Connor) Phillip Marinaccio (11) - 14:09		First period		09:08 - Kevin Dufour (15) (Rauhauser)
(Bauman) Myles Fitzgerald (6) - PP - 04:45		Second period		No scoring
(M. Fitzgerald, Struthers) Nate Arentz (11) - 01:45		Third period		00:32 - Matt Pohlkamp (11) (Spezia); 13:30 - Kevin Dufour (16) (Dalton, Pohlkamp)
No scoring		First overtime period		17:23 - GW - Kevin Dufour (17) (Smith, Schilling)
( 30 saves / 34 shots ) Michael Bitzer		Goalie stats		Chris Nell ( 45 saves / 48 shots )

March 11	Bemidji State	1–2	Bowling Green	Sanford Center	Recap
(L. Fitzgerald, Whitecloud) Gerry Fitzgerald (13) - 03:16		First period	No scoring
No scoring		Second period	01:35 - Kevin Dufour (18) (Friedman, Spezia)
No scoring		Third period	03:49 - GW - Matt Pohlkamp (12) (McLain, Baylis)
( 30 saves / 32 shots ) Michael Bitzer		Goalie stats	Chris Nell ( 25 saves / 26 shots )

Bowling Green wins series 2–0

==== (2) Michigan Tech vs. (3) Minnesota State ====
March 10	Michigan Tech	5–1	Minnesota State	MacInnes Student Ice Arena	Recap
(Smith, Gillies) Mark Auk (5) - 14:55		First period	17:31 - Charlie Gerard (3) (Lewis)
No scoring		Second period	No scoring
(Gillies, Birks) Reid Sturos (11) - GW - 03:31 (L'Esperance, Hanna) Jake Jackson (9) - 06:55 (Auk, Redmond) Gavin Gould (8) - 10:07 (Roy, Smith) Dane Birks (2) - SH - 15:20		Third period	No scoring
( 22 saves / 23 shots ) Angus Redmond		Goalie stats	Jason Pawloski ( 22 saves / 26 shots )

March 11	Michigan Tech	0–1	Minnesota State	MacInnes Student Ice Arena	Recap
No Scoring		First period	No scoring
No scoring		Second period	06:29 - GW - Zeb Knutson (15) (Lewis)
No scoring		Third period	No scoring
( 22 saves / 23 shots ) Angus Redmond		Goalie stats	Jason Pawloski ( 15 saves / 15 shots )

March 12	Michigan Tech	4–1	Minnesota State	MacInnes Student Ice Arena	Recap
(Beretta, Auk) Gavin Gould (9) - 07:10		First period	07:59 - Ian Scheid (3) (Brickley, Pawloski)
(L'Esperance, Auk) Gavin Gould (10) - GW PP - 09:28 (Roy, Smith) Gavin Gould (11) - 10:53		Second period	No scoring
(Neville) Chris Leibinger (9) - EN - 18:28		Third period	No scoring
( 20 saves / 21 shots ) Angus Redmond		Goalie stats	Jason Pawloski ( 18 saves / 21 shots )

Michigan Tech wins series 2–1

=== Championship ===
==== (2) Michigan Tech vs. (4) Bowling Green ====
March 18	Michigan Tech	3–2	2OT	Bowling Green	MacInnes Student Ice Arena	Recap
No Scoring		First period		No scoring
(Gillies) Joel L'Esperance (11) - 04:53 (Neville, Hanna) Jake Jackson (10) - 12:25		Second period		No scoring
No scoring		Third period		06:36 - Joe McKeown (2) (Rauhauser, Spezia); 07:00 - Matt Pohlkamp (13) (unassisted)
(Roy, Neville) Shane Hanna (8) - GW - 06:35		Second overtime period		No scoring
( 36 saves / 38 shots ) Angus Redmond		Goalie stats		Chris Nell ( 27 saves / 30 shots )

== Tournament awards ==
=== Most Outstanding Player ===
Shane Hanna (Michigan Tech)
