= Mike Corbett (ice hockey, born 1972) =

American ice hockey coach (born 1972)

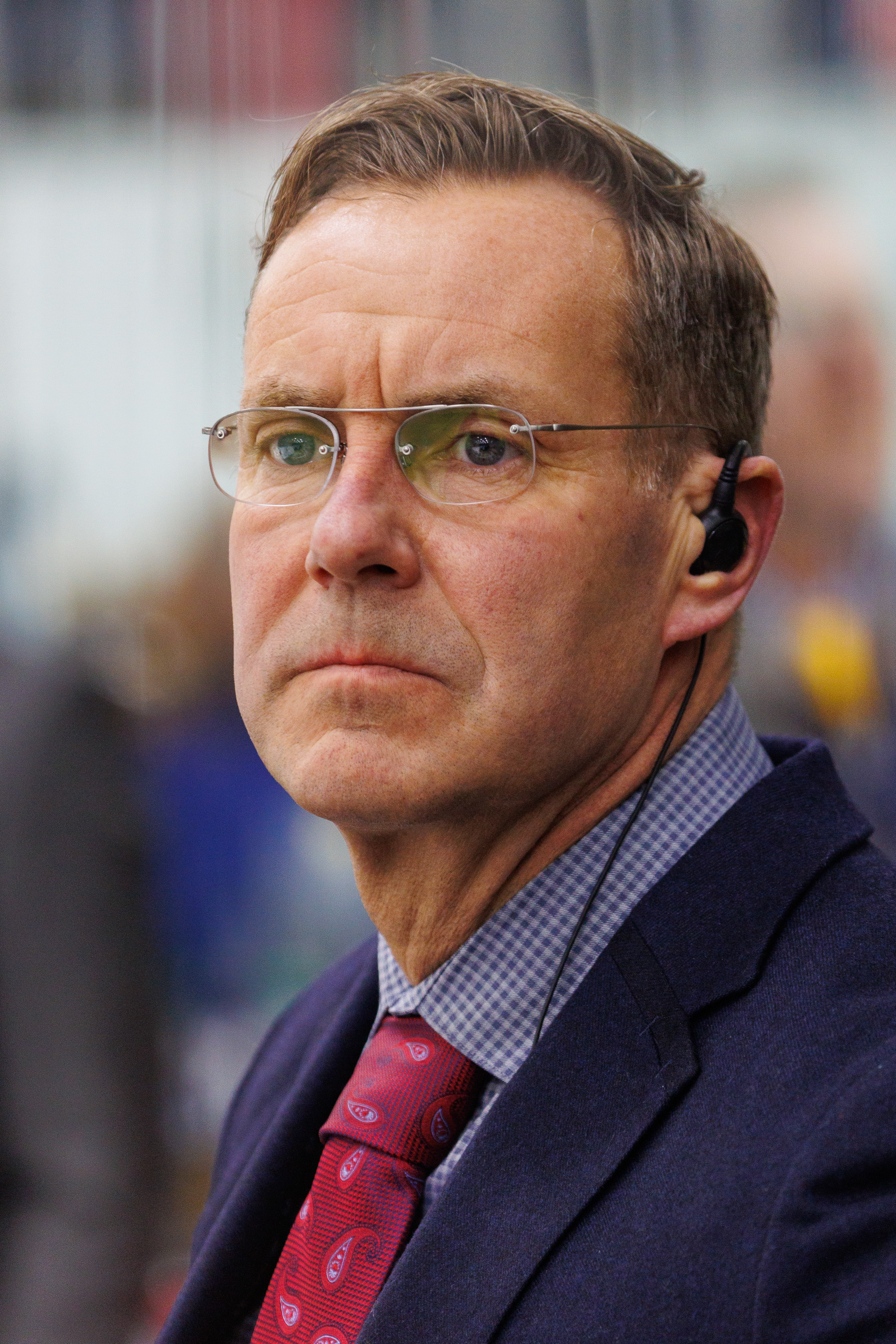
- 2024

Biographical details
- Born: January 31, 1972 (age 54); Green Bay, Wisconsin

Playing career
- 1989-1990: Barrie Colts
- 1990–1992: Wisconsin Capitols
- 1992–1997: Denver
- Position: Defenseman

Coaching career (HC unless noted)
- 1997–2000: Butte Irish
- 2000–2001: Billings Bulls
- 2001–2002: Sioux Falls Stampede
- 2003–2013: Air Force (assistant)
- 2013–2020: Alabama–Huntsville
- 2020–2021: Robert Morris (assistant)
- 2021–2024: Quinnipiac (assistant)
- 2024–2026: Arizona State (assistant)

Head coaching record
- Overall: 50–183–24 (.241)

Accomplishments and honors

Awards
- AWHL Coach of the Year (1997–98); Hockey Humanitarian Award Finalist (1997)

Mike Corbett (born January 31, 1972) is an American ice hockey coach who was most recently an assistant coach for Arizona State. He was previously the head coach for the Alabama–Huntsville Chargers from 2013 to 2020.

== Playing career ==
Corbett played junior ice hockey for the Wisconsin Capitols of the United States Hockey League from 1990 until 1992 and college ice hockey at Denver from 1992 until 1997.

== Coaching career ==
After his playing career, he coached the Butte Irish of the junior A America West Hockey League from 1997–2000 and was named the league's Coach of the Year in his first season. Corbett coached the AWHL's Billings Bulls in 2000–01, before moving to the Sioux Falls Stampede of the USHL in 2001–02. From 2003 until 2013, he was an assistant coach at Air Force; he was promoted to Associate Head Coach before the 2012–13 season.

Corbett was named UAH's sixth head coach on July 8, 2013.

After Arizona State head coach Greg Powers was placed on administrative leave on September 30, 2026, Corbett served as acting head coach but was not officially named interim head coach. Corbett was not retained as an assistant after Powers' departure and replacement by Dave Hakstol.

== Head coaching record ==
Record table
Season	Team	Overall	Conference	Standing	Postseason
Alabama-Huntsville Chargers (WCHA) (2013–2020)
2013–14	Alabama–Huntsville	2–35–1	2–25–1	10th	Did not qualify
2014–15	Alabama–Huntsville	8–26–4	7–20–1	8th	WCHA Quarterfinals
2015–16	Alabama–Huntsville	7–21–6	5–17–6	10th	
2016–17	Alabama–Huntsville	9–22–3	9–16–3	9th	
2017–18	Alabama–Huntsville	12–23–2	10–16–2	7th	WCHA Quarterfinals
2018–19	Alabama–Huntsville	8–28–2	8–18–2	8th	WCHA Quarterfinals
2019–20	Alabama–Huntsville	2–26–6	2–20–6	10th	
Alabama–Huntsville:		48–181–24	43–122–21		
Arizona State Sun Devils (NCHC) (2026–2026)
2026–27	Arizona State	2–2–0	0–0–0	–	(Acting head coach, replaced mid-season)
Arizona State:		2–2–0	0–0–0		
Total:		50–183–24			
National champion Postseason invitational champion Conference regular season champion Conference regular season and conference tournament champion Division regular season champion Division regular season and conference tournament champion Conference tournament champion
