= Shillelagh Tournament =

American collegiate men's ice hockey tournament

The Shillelagh Tournament was a Division I men's college ice hockey tournament hosted annually during the NCAA Division I men's ice hockey season by the Notre Dame Fighting Irish men's ice hockey program. It was first held during the 2008–09 NCAA Division I men's ice hockey season as the successor to the Lightning College Hockey Classic. After the Tampa Bay Lightning withdrew as tournament sponsor because of ownership changes, the Notre Dame Fighting Irish men's ice hockey program took control of the event, moving it to the Sears Centre in Hoffman Estates, Illinois.

The tournament is named after the shillelagh, a wooden club typically made from blackthorn or oak with a large knob on the end that is associated with Ireland and Irish folklore. The Notre Dame Fighting Irish football program has annually exchanged the Shillelagh Trophy with the Northwestern Wildcats from 1930–c. 1973, the Shillelagh Trophy with the Purdue Boilermakers since 1957, and the Jeweled Shillelagh with the USC Trojans since 1952.

Notre Dame won the inaugural Shillelagh Tournament, defeating the University of Minnesota Duluth 3–1 in the final game. After three seasons, the tournament was shelved for a couple years, leading some fans to believe it had run its course. But Notre Dame finally renewed it as a Thanksgiving tournament in November 2013 (rather than a New Year's tournament as it had been prior), in which the Irish were upset in the championship game. This renewal also moved the tournament from Hoffman Estates to Notre Dame's own Compton Family Ice Arena. The tournament did not return for the 2017–18 season.

== Results ==
Season	Dates	Winning team	Runner-up	Third place	Fourth place	Location	Venue	Reference
2016–17	November 25–26	Clarkson	Notre Dame	Yale	Holy Cross	South Bend, Indiana	Compton Family Ice Arena	
2015–16	November 27–28	Harvard	Rensselaer	Notre Dame	Western Michigan	South Bend, Indiana	Compton Family Ice Arena	
2014–15	November 28–29	Western Michigan	Union	Ohio State	Notre Dame	South Bend, Indiana	Compton Family Ice Arena	
2013–14	November 29–30	Northeastern	Notre Dame	Western Michigan	Alabama–Huntsville	South Bend, Indiana	Compton Family Ice Arena	
2010–11	January 1–2	Minnesota State	Brown	Notre Dame	Boston University	Hoffman Estates, Illinois	Sears Centre	
2009–10	January 2–3	Notre Dame	North Dakota	Niagara	Colgate	Hoffman Estates, Illinois	Sears Centre	
2008–09	January 2–3	Notre Dame	Minnesota–Duluth	Union	Massachusetts–Lowell	Hoffman Estates, Illinois	Sears Centre	
