= 2014–15 Alabama–Huntsville Chargers men's ice hockey season =

American college ice hockey team season

2014–15 Alabama–Huntsville Chargers men's ice hockey
- Conference: Western Collegiate Hockey Association
- Record: 8–26–4 (7–20–1 WCHA)
- Head coach: Mike Corbett (2nd season)
- Assistant coaches: Gavin Morgan; Matty Thomas
- Captain: Doug Reid
- Alternate captain: Craig Pierce
- Home stadium: Propst Arena at the Von Braun Center

The 2014–15 Alabama–Huntsville Chargers ice hockey team represented the University of Alabama in Huntsville in the 2014–15 NCAA Division I men's ice hockey season. The Chargers were coached by Mike Corbett who was in his second season as head coach. His assistant coaches were Gavin Morgan and Matty Thomas. The Chargers played their home games in the Propst Arena at the Von Braun Center and competed in the Western Collegiate Hockey Association.

UAH finished the season with 8 wins, 24 losses, and 4 ties, exceeding their win total of the previous three seasons combined. In conference play, the Chargers finished with a record of 7 wins, 20 losses, and 1 tie, placing 8th in the 10-team league. The team participated in the WCHA Tournament for the first time, after missing the playoffs in the previous season. The Chargers lost the 2-game series to second-seeded Michigan Tech, despite a 76-save performance in triple overtime from goaltender Carmine Guerriero in Game 1. Freshman Max McHugh was named to the WCHA's All-Rookie team.

== Recruiting ==
UAH added 8 freshmen for the 2014–15 season, including 1 goaltender, 4 forwards, and 3 defensemen. In addition, Alex Carpenter, who transferred from Western Michigan following the 2012–13 season, will be eligible after sitting out one season.

Player	Position	Nationality	Notes
James Block	Forward	United States	Wrightstown, Wisconsin
Richard Buri	Defenseman	Slovakia	Nitra, Slovakia; played in the 2013 World Junior Championships for Slovakia
Cody Champagne	Defenseman	United States	Brookfield, Connecticut; 2013–14 NAHL All-Rookie Second Team
Josh Kestner	Forward	United States	Huntsville, Alabama
Max McHugh	Forward	United States	Edgewood, Washington; former Dubuque Fighting Saints alternate captain
Brandon Parker	Defenseman	United States	Faribault, Minnesota
Brennan Saulnier	Forward	Canada	Halifax, Nova Scotia
Jordan Uhelski	Goaltender	United States	Burton, Michigan

== Roster ==
=== Departures from 2013–14 team ===
- Alex Allan, F, Graduated – signed with the Brampton Beast (ECHL)
- Joakim Broberg, F – transferred to St. Thomas (MN) (MIAC (D-III))
- Brandon Clowes, F – transferred to Lethbridge (CIS)
- C. J. Groh, G, Graduated
- Brice Geoffrion, F, Graduated
- Mat Hagen, D, Graduated
- Stephen Hickey, D
- Jamie Kendra, F – transferred to Brock (CIS)
- Steve Koshey, D
- Stephen McKenna, F
- Wade Schools, D – transferred to American International (AHA)

=== 2014–15 team ===
As of October 13, 2014

No.	Nat.	Player	Class	Pos	Height	Weight	DoB	Hometown	Previous team
2		Graeme Strukoff	Senior	D	6' 0" (1.83 m)	200 lb (91 kg)	1991-03-30	Chilliwack, British Columbia	Victoria (BCHL)
3		Anderson White	Junior	D/F	6' 4" (1.93 m)	220 lb (100 kg)	1991-08-16	Caledon, Ontario	Chilliwack (BCHL)
4		Frank Misuraca	Junior	D	5' 11" (1.8 m)	180 lb (82 kg)	1991-09-06	Clinton Township, Michigan	Corpus Christi (NAHL)
5		Cody Champagne	Freshman	D	5' 11" (1.8 m)	185 lb (84 kg)	1994-08-09	Brookfield, Connecticut	Topeka (NAHL)
6		Brandon Carlson	Sophomore	D/F	6' 2" (1.88 m)	205 lb (93 kg)	1992-06-15	Huntington Beach, California	Dubuque (USHL)
7		Max McHugh	Freshman	F	5' 10" (1.78 m)	170 lb (77 kg)	1993-08-20	Seattle, Washington	Dubuque (USHL)
8		Bryan Siersma	Sophomore	F	5' 9" (1.75 m)	155 lb (70 kg)	1993-02-25	Huntsville, Alabama	Dallas (WSHL)
9		Chad Brears	Junior	F	6' 0" (1.83 m)	175 lb (79 kg)	1991-05-08	Ottawa, Ontario	Merritt (BCHL)
10		Brent Fletcher	Sophomore	F	6' 2" (1.88 m)	200 lb (91 kg)	1992-05-09	New Westminster, British Columbia	Merritt (BCHL)
11		Jack Prince	Junior	F	6' 3" (1.91 m)	205 lb (93 kg)	1991-02-14	Leicester, England	Texas (NAHL)
12		Regan Soquila	Sophomore	F	5' 10" (1.78 m)	180 lb (82 kg)	1993-06-03	Maple Ridge, British Columbia	Merritt (BCHL)
13		Alex Carpenter	Junior	F	5' 8" (1.73 m)	175 lb (79 kg)	1991-07-20	Portage, Michigan	Western Michigan (NCAA)
16		Doug Reid (C)	Senior	F	6' 0" (1.83 m)	195 lb (88 kg)	1990-03-20	Innisfil, Ontario	Markham (OJHL)
18		James Block	Freshman	F	5' 11" (1.8 m)	170 lb (77 kg)	1996-05-24	Wrightstown, Wisconsin	Wrightstown HS (USHS–WI)
19		Craig Pierce (A)	Senior	F	5' 11" (1.8 m)	180 lb (82 kg)	1990-10-18	Roswell, Georgia	Rochester (EJHL)
20		Brandon Parker	Freshman	D	5' 10" (1.78 m)	175 lb (79 kg)	1993-02-17	Faribault, Minnesota	Brookings (NAHL)
21		Jeff Vanderlugt	Senior	F	6' 3" (1.91 m)	220 lb (100 kg)	1990-05-12	Richmond Hill, Ontario	Surrey (BCHL)
22		Matt Salhany	Sophomore	F	5' 10" (1.78 m)	175 lb (79 kg)	1993-01-08	Warwick, Rhode Island	Boston (EJHL)
23		Cody Marooney	Sophomore	F	6' 0" (1.83 m)	200 lb (91 kg)	1992-07-07	Eden Prairie, Minnesota	Brookings (NAHL)
24		Brennan Saulnier	Freshman	C	6' 0" (1.83 m)	170 lb (77 kg)	1993-12-29	Halifax, Nova Scotia	Fort McMurray (AJHL)
26		Josh Kestner	Freshman	F	6' 0" (1.83 m)	170 lb (77 kg)	1993-11-08	Huntsville, Alabama	Sarnia (GOJHL)
28		Ben Reinhardt	Senior	D	5' 10" (1.78 m)	185 lb (84 kg)	1990-03-24	Arnprior, Ontario	Pembroke (CCHL)
30		Matt Larose	Sophomore	G	6' 5" (1.96 m)	210 lb (95 kg)	1992-08-15	Nanaimo, British Columbia	Wellington (OJHL)
32		Jordan Uhelski	Freshman	G	6' 1" (1.85 m)	185 lb (84 kg)	1993-08-04	Flint, Michigan	Muskegon (USHL)
33		Richard Buri	Freshman	D	6' 5" (1.96 m)	215 lb (98 kg)	1994-01-12	Nitra, Slovakia	Minnesota (NAHL)
35		Carmine Guerriero	Sophomore	G	5' 11" (1.8 m)	175 lb (79 kg)	1992-02-20	Montreal, Quebec	Hawkesbury (CCHL)

== Schedule and results ==
- Green background indicates win.
- Red background indicates loss.
- Yellow background indicates tie.

Date	Time	Opponent	Site	Decision	Result	Attendance	Record
Regular Season
October 10	8:30 pm	at Colorado College*	Colorado Springs World Arena • Colorado Springs, Colorado	Guerriero	L 2–3	6,052	0–1–0
October 11	8:00 pm	at Colorado College*	Colorado Springs World Arena • Colorado Springs, Colorado	Larose	L 3–4	6,443	0–2–0
October 17	7:00 pm	Bowling Green	Propst Arena • Huntsville, Alabama	Guerriero	L 0–5	2,420	0–3–0 (0–1–0)
October 18	7:00 pm	Bowling Green	Propst Arena • Huntsville, Alabama	Larose	L 1–4	1,432	0–4–0 (0–2–0)
October 24	7:00 pm	at #13 Minnesota State	Verizon Wireless Center • Mankato, Minnesota	Guerriero	L 1–3	3,171	0–5–0 (0–3–0)
October 25	7:00 pm	at #13 Minnesota State	Verizon Wireless Center • Mankato, Minnesota	Larose	L 1–4	3,086	0–6–0 (0–4–0)
October 31	6:00 pm	at Northern Michigan*	Berry Events Center • Marquette, Michigan	Guerriero	T 1–1 ^{OT}	1,937	0–6–1 (0–4–0)
November 1	6:00 pm	at Northern Michigan*	Berry Events Center • Marquette, Michigan	Larose	L 1–4	1,927	0–7–1 (0–4–0)
November 7	8:00 pm	at Air Force*	Cadet Ice Arena • Colorado Springs, Colorado	Guerriero	W 4–2	1,723	1–7–1 (0–4–0)
November 8	8:00 pm	at Air Force*	Cadet Ice Arena • Colorado Springs, Colorado	Larose	T 3–3 ^{OT}	1,556	1–7–2 (0–4–0)
November 14	7:00 pm	Lake Superior State	Propst Arena • Huntsville, Alabama	Guerriero	L 0–1	1,518	1–8–2 (0–5–0)
November 15	7:00 pm	Lake Superior State	Propst Arena • Huntsville, Alabama	Guerriero	W 5–2	2,135	2–8–2 (1–5–0)
November 21	6:00 pm	at Ferris State	Ewigleben Arena • Big Rapids, Michigan	Guerriero	W 3–2	1,908	3–8–2 (2–5–0)
November 22	6:00 pm	at Ferris State	Ewigleben Arena • Big Rapids, Michigan	Guerriero	L 2–5	2,206	3–9–2 (2–6–0)
November 28	7:00 pm	#6 Michigan Tech	Propst Arena • Huntsville, Alabama	Guerriero	L 2–4	1,880	3–10–2 (2–7–0)
November 29	7:00 pm	#6 Michigan Tech	Propst Arena • Huntsville, Alabama	Larose	L 2–5	1,189	3–11–2 (2–8–0)
December 12	10:00 pm	at Alaska	Carlson Center • Fairbanks, Alaska	Guerriero	L 1–2 ^{OT}	2,593	3–12–2 (2–9–0)
December 13	10:00 pm	at Alaska	Carlson Center • Fairbanks, Alaska	Larose	L 0–4	2,413	3–13–2 (2–10–0)
December 20	7:00 pm	at #12 Nebraska–Omaha*	CenturyLink Center • Omaha, Nebraska	Guerriero	L 1–2	4,347	3–14–2 (2–10–0)
December 21	5:00 pm	at #12 Nebraska–Omaha*	CenturyLink Center • Omaha, Nebraska	Guerriero	T 3–3 ^{OT}	3,923	3–14–3 (2–10–0)
January 2	7:00 pm	Alaska–Anchorage	Propst Arena • Huntsville, Alabama	Guerriero	W 3–2	1,907	4–14–3 (3–10–0)
January 3	7:00 pm	Alaska–Anchorage	Propst Arena • Huntsville, Alabama	Guerriero	W 2–1	2,143	5–14–3 (4–10–0)
January 9	7:30 pm	at Bemidji State	Sanford Center • Bemidji, Minnesota	Guerriero	L 0–4	3,115	5–15–3 (4–11–0)
January 10	7:00 pm	at Bemidji State	Sanford Center • Bemidji, Minnesota	Larose	L 0–4	3,442	5–16–3 (4–12–0)
January 16	7:00 pm	Northern Michigan	Propst Arena • Huntsville, Alabama	Guerriero	W 2–1	3,423	6–16–3 (5–12–0)
January 17	7:00 pm	Northern Michigan	Propst Arena • Huntsville, Alabama	Guerriero	W 3–2	2,010	7–16–3 (6–12–0)
January 24	2:00 pm	US Under-18 Team*	Propst Arena • Huntsville, Alabama (Exhibition)	Larose	L 1–2 ^{OT}	1,403	7–16–3 (6–12–0)
January 25	2:00 pm	US Under-18 Team*	Propst Arena • Huntsville, Alabama (Exhibition)	Larose	L 2–4	1,205	7–16–3 (6–12–0)
January 30	6:00 pm	at #8 Michigan Tech	MacInnes Student Ice Arena • Houghton, Michigan	Guerriero	L 0–5	2,740	7–17–3 (6–13–0)
January 31	6:00 pm	at #8 Michigan Tech	MacInnes Student Ice Arena • Houghton, Michigan	Guerriero	L 1–11	2,897	7–18–3 (6–14–0)
February 13	6:30 pm	at Lake Superior State	Taffy Abel Arena • Sault Ste. Marie, Michigan	Guerriero	T 1–1 ^{OT}	1,852	7–18–4 (6–14–1)
February 14	6:00 pm	at Lake Superior State	Taffy Abel Arena • Sault Ste. Marie, Michigan	Guerriero	W 3–1	1,845	8–18–4 (7–14–1)
February 20	7:00 pm	Ferris State	Propst Arena • Huntsville, Alabama	Guerriero	L 1–2	833	8–19–4 (7–15–1)
February 21	7:00 pm	Ferris State	Propst Arena • Huntsville, Alabama	Guerriero	L 2–3	1,934	8–20–4 (7–16–1)
February 27	7:00 pm	Alaska	Propst Arena • Huntsville, Alabama	Guerriero	L 2–4	2,032	8–21–4 (7–17–1)
February 28	7:00 pm	Alaska	Propst Arena • Huntsville, Alabama	Guerriero	L 3–4 ^{OT}	2,051	8–22–4 (7–18–1)
March 6	6:00 pm	at #13 Bowling Green	BGSU Ice Arena • Bowling Green, Ohio	Guerriero	L 2–7	1,657	8–23–4 (7–19–1)
March 7	6:00 pm	at #13 Bowling Green	BGSU Ice Arena • Bowling Green, Ohio	Larose	L 1–2	1,930	8–24–4 (7–20–1)
WCHA Tournament
March 13	6:00 pm	at #4 Michigan Tech*	MacInnes Student Ice Arena • Houghton, Michigan (WCHA First Round)	Guerriero	L 0–1 ^{3OT}	3,038	8–25–4 (7–20–1)
March 14	6:00 pm	at #4 Michigan Tech*	MacInnes Student Ice Arena • Houghton, Michigan (WCHA First Round)	Guerriero	L 0–3	3,629	8–26–4 (7–20–1)
*Non-conference game. ^{#}Rankings from USCHO.com Poll. All times are in Central Time. Source:

=== Standings ===
2014–15 Western Collegiate Hockey Association standings
	Conference record							Overall record					
	GP	W	L	T	PTS	GF	GA	GP	W	L	T	GF	GA
#7 Minnesota State †*	28	21	4	3	45	98	47	40	29	8	3	145	77
#9 Michigan Tech	28	21	5	2	44	103	48	41	29	10	2	144	74
#18 Bowling Green	28	17	8	3	37	87	66	39	23	11	5	119	93
Alaska^	28	14	12	2	30	75	69	34	19	13	2	92	81
Bemidji State	28	12	11	5	29	73	62	38	16	17	5	101	90
Ferris State	28	13	14	1	27	66	58	40	18	20	2	88	88
Northern Michigan	28	11	13	4	26	59	71	38	14	18	6	86	100
Alabama–Huntsville	28	7	20	1	15	44	95	38	8	26	4	62	121
Lake Superior State	28	7	20	1	15	44	91	38	8	28	2	60	131
Alaska Anchorage	28	5	21	2	12	52	94	34	8	22	4	70	107
Championship: March 21, 2015 † indicates conference regular season champion (MacNaughton Cup); * indicates conference tournament champion (Broadmoor Trophy)^ indicates ineligible for postseason play due to NCAA sanctions Rankings: USCHO.com Top 20 Poll; updated March 9, 2015

== Player stats ==
As of March 14, 2015

=== Skaters ===
Player	Pos	Yr	GP	G	A	Pts	PIM	PPG	SHG	GWG
Max McHugh	F	Fr	38	12	11	23	28	5	0	2
Chad Brears	F	Jr	36	3	12	15	59	2	0	1
Jack Prince	F	Jr	36	5	9	14	14	2	0	0
Brandon Parker	D	Fr	37	0	14	14	34	0	0	0
Jeff Vanderlugt	F	Sr	33	6	7	13	72	3	0	0
Frank Misuraca	D	Jr	38	6	6	12	12	0	0	1
Brandon Carlson	D	So	38	5	5	10	37	2	0	0
Brennan Saulnier	F	Fr	32	1	8	9	94	1	0	0
Alex Carpenter	F	Sr	32	3	5	8	16	0	0	0
Brent Fletcher	F	So	38	2	5	7	43	1	0	0
Matt Salhany	F	So	37	1	6	7	14	0	1	0
Josh Kestner	F	Fr	35	4	2	6	34	1	0	1
Cody Marooney	F	So	36	3	3	6	44	0	1	2
Richard Buri	D	Fr	31	3	2	5	50	0	0	1
Doug Reid	F	Sr	36	3	2	5	22	0	0	0
Craig Pierce	F	Sr	28	3	1	4	8	0	1	0
Cody Champagne	D	Fr	38	2	2	4	18	2	0	0
Ben Reinhardt	D	Sr	12	0	3	3	10	0	0	0
Anderson White	D	Jr	15	0	1	1	4	0	0	0
Graeme Strukoff	D	Sr	31	0	1	1	40	0	0	0
Matt Larose	G	So	11	0	0	0	0	0	0	0
Regan Soquila	F	So	27	0	0	0	10	0	0	0
Carmine Guerriero	G	So	29	0	0	0	6	0	0	0
Team			38	62	105	167	669	19	3	8

=== Goaltenders ===
Player	Yr	GP	TOI	W	L	T	GA	GAA	SV	SV%	SO
Carmine Guerriero	So	29	1737:07	8	18	3	74	2.56	958	0.928	0
Matt Larose	So	11	614:26	0	8	1	43	4.20	349	0.890	0
