= Teddy Blueger =

Latvian ice hockey player (born 1994)

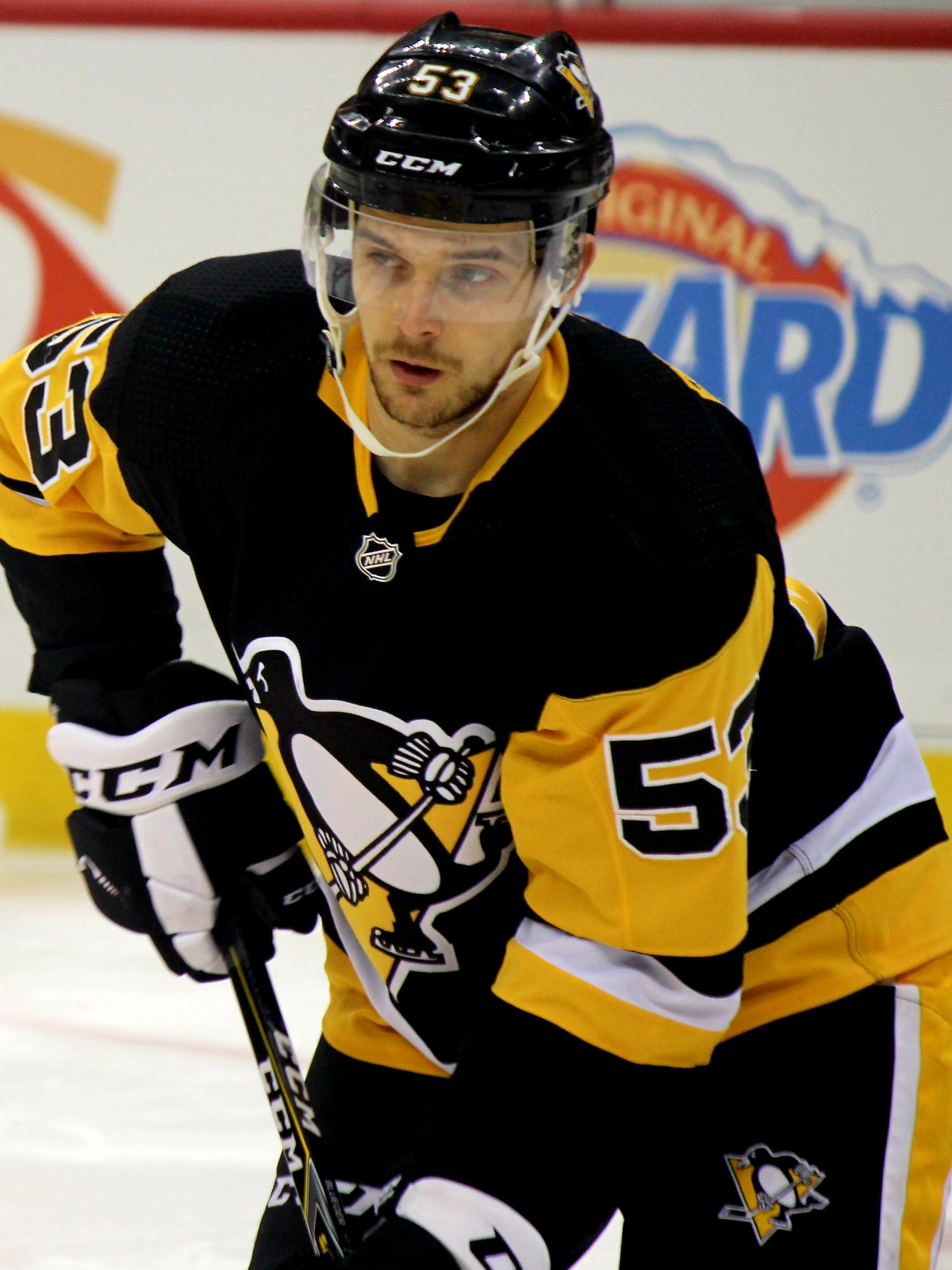
- Bļugers with the Pittsburgh Penguins in 2019
- Born: 15 August 1994 (age 32) Riga, Latvia
- Height: 6 ft 0 in (183 cm)
- Weight: 185 lb (84 kg; 13 st 3 lb)
- Position: Centre
- Shoots: Left
- NHL team Former teams: Toronto Maple Leafs; Pittsburgh Penguins; Vegas Golden Knights; Vancouver Canucks
- National team: Latvia
- NHL draft: 52nd overall, 2012; Pittsburgh Penguins
- Playing career: 2016–present

Teodors Bļugers (anglicized as Theodor "Teddy" Blueger; born 15 August 1994) is a Latvian professional ice hockey player who is a centre for the Toronto Maple Leafs of the National Hockey League (NHL). He was selected 52nd overall in the 2012 NHL entry draft by the Pittsburgh Penguins, making him the fourth-highest selected Latvian player in the NHL entry draft, behind Zemgus Girgensons, Alberts Šmits and Sandis Ozoliņš.

Bļugers played for Shattuck-Saint Mary's in Minnesota from 2009 to 2012 before committing to play collegiate ice hockey for Minnesota State. While attending Shattuck, he helped them clinch a USA Hockey national U18 title and 2011 Bauer/NIT tournament title. After graduating from Shattuck, Bļugers spent four seasons at Minnesota State where he earned All-Tournament Team honors. From there, Bļugers played in five seasons with Pittsburgh before he was traded to the Vegas Golden Knights at the 2023 trade deadline. Although he only played for part of the playoffs, Bļugers would win the Stanley Cup with the Golden Knights that season, and sign with the Canucks the following off-season.

== Early life ==
Bļugers was born on 15 August 1994, in Riga, Latvia, to parents Valentīns Bļugers and Jana Bļugere. As his mother was a close friend to Elvis Merzļikins' parents, Bļugers and Merzļikins grew up playing together in Latvia. As a youth, Bļugers played both ice hockey and soccer until he was 12 or 13. As such, he grew up a fan of FC Barcelona and Ronaldinho. Due to his father's career as an attorney and a member of the Latvian Ice Hockey Federation, Bļugers attended the International School of Latvia before leaving for Shattuck-Saint Mary's in Faribault, Minnesota. His younger brother Roberts also played for Shattuck-Saint Mary's from 2012 to 2016. Bļugers chose to attend Shattuck after seeing a segment focusing on Shattuck alumnus Sidney Crosby.

== Playing career ==
=== Amateur ===
Bļugers played for Shattuck-Saint Mary's School from 2009 until 2012 and he helped lead them to a USA Hockey national U18 title and 2011 Bauer/NIT tournament title.

He committed to a collegiate career with Minnesota State and played four seasons in the NCAA from 2012 to 2016. Bļugers was named to the All-Tournament Team for the 2014 WCHA Men's Ice Hockey Tournament. In 2015–16, Bļugers was named to the All-WCHA First Team.

=== Pittsburgh Penguins ===
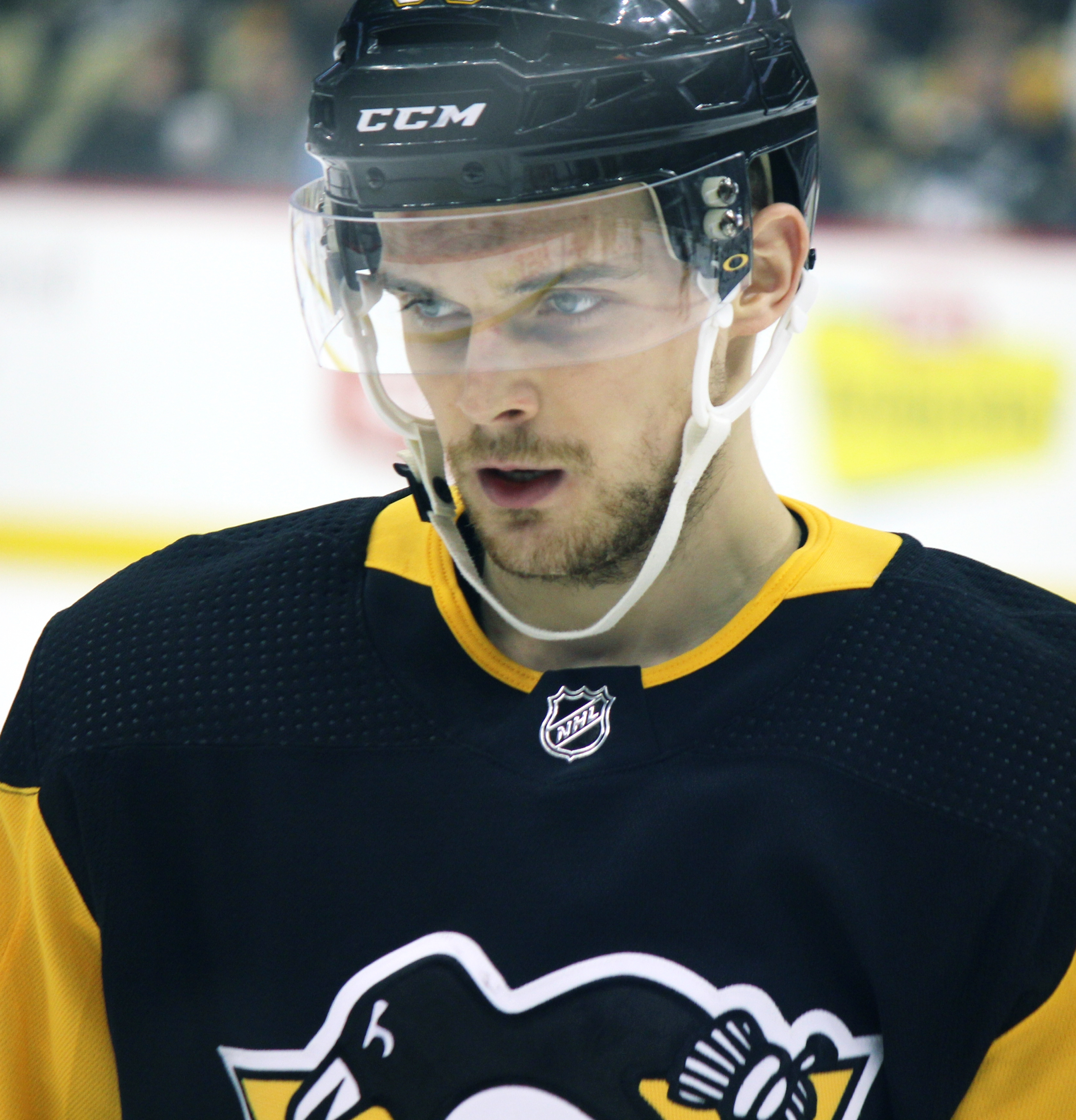
Bļugers with the Pittsburgh Penguins in 2019.

On 22 March 2016, Bļugers signed an entry-level agreement with the Pittsburgh Penguins. He finished the 2015–16 season with Penguins' AHL affiliate, the Wilkes-Barre Scranton Penguins playing in 10 games. In his first full season with the Wilkes-Barre/Scranton Penguins, Bļugers set a new franchise record for plus-minus rating by a rookie with a +24.

Bļugers made his NHL debut on 30 January 2019, in Pittsburgh's game against the Tampa Bay Lightning. On 1 February 2019, Bļugers scored his first NHL goal, against the Ottawa Senators in a 5–3 Penguins win.

On 16 July 2019, Bļugers re-signed with the Penguins on a two-year, one-way contract with an average annual value of $750,000. On 14 July 2021, he was re-signed to a two-year, $4.4 million contract extension with the Penguins.

=== Vegas Golden Knights ===
Bļugers was traded to the Vegas Golden Knights on 1 March 2023, in exchange for a third-round pick in 2024 and prospect Peter DiLiberatore. He made an immediate impact to the Golden Knights fourth line, scoring four points through his first eight games. However, he would only add two more points over his next 10 games to end the regular season with six points. When the Golden Knights faced off against the Dallas Stars in the Western Conference finals of the 2023 Stanley Cup playoffs, Bļugers scored his first goal of the postseason in Game 1. He finished the postseason with two points over six games as the Golden Knights won their first Stanley Cup in franchise history. Although his name was not immediately eligible to be placed on the Stanley Cup, the Golden Knights petitioned for his name to be added.

=== Vancouver Canucks ===
On 1 July 2023, Bļugers left the Golden Knights as a free agent and was signed to a one-year, $1.9 million deal with the Vancouver Canucks for the 2023–24 season. While with the Canucks, Bļugers tallied his 100th career NHL point on 24 November, against the Seattle Kraken. On 26 June 2024, Bļugers agreed to terms on a two-year contract with the Canucks worth $1.8 million in average annual value.

=== Toronto Maple Leafs ===
On 1 July 2026, Bļugers signed a two-year, $5 million contract with the Toronto Maple Leafs.

== International play ==
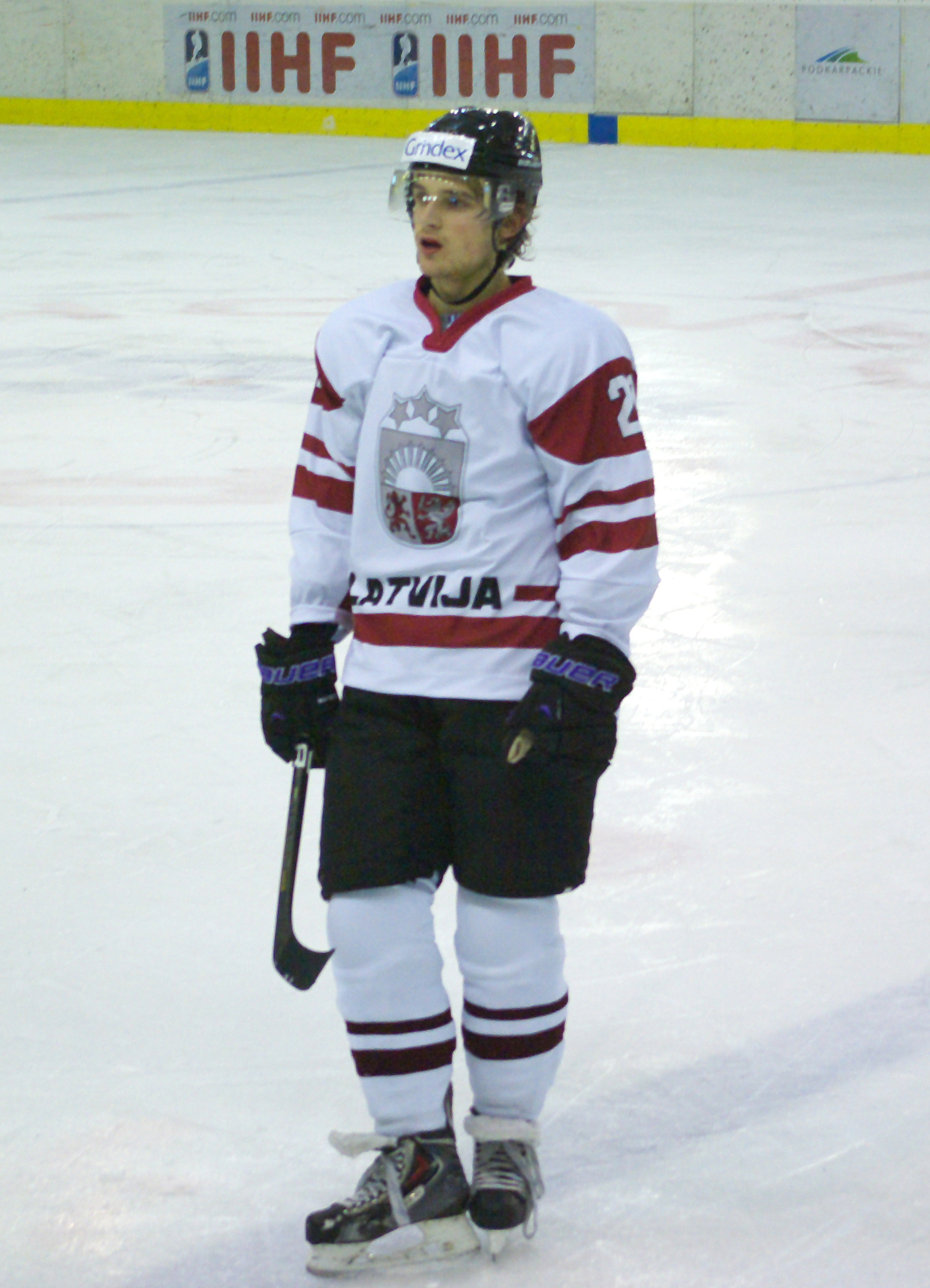
Bļugers with Latvia in 2013

Bļugers has represented Latvia at the international junior level, appearing in the 2011 IIHF World U18 Championships and four World Junior Ice Hockey Championships. He made his senior debut when he was selected to play for Latvia at the 2017 IIHF World Championship. The following year, he was again named to the Latvia national team to compete at the 2018 IIHF World Championship.

== Personal life ==
Bļugers married his wife, Monique LaFontaine, whom he met at Minnesota State, in 2021. He is a Christian. Bļugers originally grew up areligious in Latvia and began discovering Christianity when he immigrated to the United States to pursue hockey. He originally began attending Church services upon dating LaFontaine and now regularly attends Church services and Bible studies.

== Career statistics ==
=== Regular season and playoffs ===
			Regular season					Playoffs
Season	Team	League	GP	G	A	Pts	PIM	GP	G	A	Pts	PIM
2009–10	Shattuck St. Mary's	U16 AAA	53	20	40	60	84	—	—	—	—	—
2010–11	Shattuck St. Mary's	USHS	54	24	42	66	32	—	—	—	—	—
2011–12	Shattuck St. Mary's	USHS	51	24	64	88	63	—	—	—	—	—
2012–13	Minnesota State	NCAA	37	6	13	19	40	—	—	—	—	—
2013–14	Minnesota State	NCAA	40	4	22	26	55	—	—	—	—	—
2014–15	Minnesota State	NCAA	37	10	18	28	26	—	—	—	—	—
2015–16	Minnesota State	NCAA	41	11	24	35	29	—	—	—	—	—
2015–16	Wilkes-Barre/Scranton Penguins	AHL	10	0	0	0	2	10	0	1	1	4
2016–17	Wilkes-Barre/Scranton Penguins	AHL	54	7	24	31	20	5	1	0	1	2
2017–18	Wilkes-Barre/Scranton Penguins	AHL	70	21	24	45	43	3	0	2	2	4
2018–19	Wilkes-Barre/Scranton Penguins	AHL	45	21	18	39	18	—	—	—	—	—
2018–19	Pittsburgh Penguins	NHL	28	6	4	10	15	1	0	0	0	0
2019–20	Pittsburgh Penguins	NHL	69	9	13	22	25	4	1	0	1	0
2020–21	Pittsburgh Penguins	NHL	43	7	15	22	16	6	0	0	0	2
2021–22	Pittsburgh Penguins	NHL	65	9	19	28	10	7	0	1	1	2
2022–23	Pittsburgh Penguins	NHL	45	2	8	10	16	—	—	—	—	—
2022–23	Vegas Golden Knights	NHL	18	2	4	6	14	6	1	1	2	0
2023–24	Vancouver Canucks	NHL	68	6	22	28	31	13	0	2	2	6
2024–25	Vancouver Canucks	NHL	82	8	18	26	39	—	—	—	—	—
2025–26	Vancouver Canucks	NHL	35	9	8	17	22	—	—	—	—	—
NHL totals			453	58	111	169	188	37	2	4	6	10

=== International ===
Year	Team	Event	Result	GP	G	A	Pts	PIM
2011	Latvia	U18 D1	11th	4	4	1	5	0
2012	Latvia	WJC	9th	6	1	2	3	6
2012	Latvia	U18	9th	6	2	2	4	6
2013	Latvia	WJC	10th	6	1	2	3	8
2014	Latvia	WJC D1A	12th	3	0	1	1	8
2017	Latvia	WC	10th	7	1	0	1	6
2018	Latvia	WC	8th	5	1	2	3	0
2019	Latvia	WC	10th	7	1	3	4	6
2021	Latvia	OGQ	Q	3	2	2	4	2
2026	Latvia	OG	10th	4	0	1	1	2
Junior totals				40	12	18	30	42
Senior totals				26	5	8	13	16

== Awards and honours ==
Award	Year	Ref
College
WCHA All-Tournament Team	2014	
All-WCHA First Team	2015–16	
NHL
Stanley Cup champion	2023	
