= 2013–14 Alabama–Huntsville Chargers men's ice hockey season =

Alabama–Huntsville Chargers men's ice hockey season

2013–14 Alabama–Huntsville Chargers men's ice hockey
- Conference: Western Collegiate Hockey Association
- Record: 2–35–1 (2–25–1 WCHA)
- Head coach: Mike Corbett (1st season)
- Assistant coaches: Gavin Morgan; Matty Thomas
- Captain: Doug Reid
- Home stadium: Propst Arena

The 2013–14 Alabama–Huntsville Chargers ice hockey team represented the University of Alabama in Huntsville in the 2013–14 NCAA Division I men's ice hockey season. The Chargers were coached by Mike Corbett who was in his first season as head coach. His assistant coaches were Gavin Morgan and Matty Thomas. The Chargers played their home games in the Propst Arena at the Von Braun Center and competed for the first time in the Western Collegiate Hockey Association.

== Preseason ==
On January 17, 2013, after months of discussions with conference officials and league member representatives, UAH formally applied to and was accepted to join the Western Collegiate Hockey Association beginning with the 2013–14 season, after three seasons as an independent. On May 29, 2013, head coach Kurt Kleinendorst resigned, later signing as head coach of the American Hockey League's Iowa Wild. Mike Corbett was named UAH's sixth head coach on July 8, 2013. Matty Thomas was announced as assistant coach on August 8, replacing Bruce Garber.

=== Recruiting ===
UAH added 11 freshmen for the 2013–14 season, including 2 goaltenders, 7 forwards, and 2 defensemen:

Player	Position	Nationality	Notes
Joakim Broberg	Left Wing	Sweden	Lidköping, Sweden; former Linköping J20 alternate captain, 2011–12 J20 SuperElit champion with Linköping, played one season with the Sweden Under-18 Team
Brandon Carlson	Defenseman	United States	Huntington Beach, California; 2012–13 USHL Champion with the Dubuque Fighting Saints, 2010–11 NAHL champion with the Fairbanks Ice Dogs
Brandon Clowes	Left Wing	Canada	Calgary, Alberta
Brent Fletcher	Right Wing	Canada	New Westminster, British Columbia; former Merritt Centennials captain
Carmine Guerriero	Goaltender	Canada	Montreal, Quebec
Matt Larose	Goaltender	Canada	Nanaimo, British Columbia
Cody Marooney	Forward	United States	Eden Prairie, Minnesota; former Sioux City Musketeers and Brookings Blizzard captain
Steve McKenna	Left Wing	United States	South Boston, Massachusetts; 2011–12 EJHL champion with the New Hampshire Jr. Monarchs
Matt Salhany	Right Wing	United States	Warwick, Rhode Island
Wade Schools	Defenseman	United States	Hartford, Connecticut; former Springfield Pics captain, 2012–13 EJHL All-Star
Regan Soquila	Forward	Canada	Maple Ridge, British Columbia

== Roster ==
=== Departures from 2012–13 team ===
- Justin Cseter, F, Graduated – signed with the Huntsville Havoc (SPHL)
- Curtis deBruyn, D, Graduated – signed with Miskolci JJSE (MOL Liga)
- Sebastian Geoffrion, F, Graduated – signed with the Arizona Sundogs (CHL)
- John Griggs, G, Graduated – signed with the Pensacola Ice Flyers (SPHL)
- Gregg Gruehl, G
- Tyler Kotlarz, F
- Kyle Lysaght, F
- Lasse Uusivirta, D – signed with the Aalborg Pirates (Denmark)

=== 2013–14 team ===
As of October 13, 2013.

No.	Nat.	Player	Class	Pos	Height	Weight	DoB	Hometown	Previous team
2		Graeme Strukoff	Junior	D	6' 0" (1.83 m)	195 lb (88 kg)	1991-03-30	Chilliwack, British Columbia	Victoria (BCHL)
3		Anderson White	Sophomore	D	6' 4" (1.93 m)	200 lb (91 kg)	1991-08-16	Caledon, Ontario	Chilliwack (BCHL)
4		Frank Misuraca	Sophomore	D	5' 11" (1.8 m)	195 lb (88 kg)	1991-09-06	Clinton Township, Michigan	Corpus Christi (NAHL)
6		Brandon Carlson	Freshman	D	6' 2" (1.88 m)	200 lb (91 kg)	1992-06-15	Huntington Beach, California	Dubuque (USHL)
7		Jamie Kendra	Sophomore	F	5' 10" (1.78 m)	195 lb (88 kg)	1992-02-25	Markham, Ontario	Markham (OJHL)
8		Alex Allan	Senior	F	6' 0" (1.83 m)	185 lb (84 kg)	1989-08-28	Calgary, Alberta	Victoria (BCHL)
9		Chad Brears	Sophomore	F	6' 0" (1.83 m)	175 lb (79 kg)	1991-05-08	Ottawa, Ontario	Merritt (BCHL)
10		Mat Hagen	Senior	D	5' 10" (1.78 m)	185 lb (84 kg)	1989-12-27	Ottawa, Ontario	Kanata (CJHL)
11		Jack Prince	Sophomore	F	6' 1" (1.85 m)	200 lb (91 kg)	1991-02-14	London, England	Texas (NAHL)
12		Brent Fletcher	Freshman	F	6' 2" (1.88 m)	200 lb (91 kg)	1992-05-09	New Westminster, British Columbia	Merritt (BCHL)
14		Stephen Hickey	Sophomore	D	6' 3" (1.91 m)	185 lb (84 kg)	1991-09-25	Ancaster, Ontario	Oakville (OJHL)
16		Doug Reid (C)	Junior	F	6' 0" (1.83 m)	200 lb (91 kg)	1990-03-20	Innisfil, Ontario	Markham (OJHL)
18		Brandon Clowes	Freshman	F	6' 0" (1.83 m)	180 lb (82 kg)	1992-04-10	Calgary, Alberta	Olds (AJHL)
19		Craig Pierce	Junior	F	5' 11" (1.8 m)	190 lb (86 kg)	1990-10-18	Roswell, Georgia	Rochester (EJHL)
20		Stephen McKenna	Freshman	F	6' 3" (1.91 m)	190 lb (86 kg)	1993-04-21	South Boston, Massachusetts	New Hampshire (EJHL)
21		Jeff Vanderlugt	Junior	F	6' 3" (1.91 m)	220 lb (100 kg)	1990-05-12	Richmond Hill, Ontario	Surrey (BCHL)
22		Matt Salhany	Freshman	F	5' 10" (1.78 m)	175 lb (79 kg)	1993-01-08	Warwick, Rhode Island	Boston (EJHL)
23		Cody Marooney	Freshman	F	6' 2" (1.88 m)	195 lb (88 kg)	1992-07-07	Eden Prairie, Minnesota	Brookings (NAHL)
24		Steven Koshey	Sophomore	D	5' 9" (1.75 m)	190 lb (86 kg)	1991-03-27	Trail, British Columbia	Surrey (BCHL)
25		Joakim Broberg	Freshman	F	6' 3" (1.91 m)	215 lb (98 kg)	1993-02-10	Lidköping, Sweden	Linköping J20 (SuperElit)
26		Wade Schools	Freshman	D	6' 4" (1.93 m)	190 lb (86 kg)	1992-08-31	Hartford, Connecticut	Springfield (EJHL)
28		Ben Reinhardt	Junior	D	5' 10" (1.78 m)	185 lb (84 kg)	1990-03-24	Arnprior, Ontario	Pembroke (CCHL)
30		Matt Larose	Freshman	G	6' 5" (1.96 m)	215 lb (98 kg)	1992-08-15	Nanaimo, British Columbia	Wellington (OJHL)
32		C. J. Groh	Senior	G	6' 2" (1.88 m)	185 lb (84 kg)	1990-04-16	Cincinnati, Ohio	St. Louis (NAHL)
33		Regan Soquila	Freshman	F	5' 10" (1.78 m)	180 lb (82 kg)	1993-06-03	Maple Ridge, British Columbia	Merritt (BCHL)
35		Carmine Guerriero	Freshman	G	5' 11" (1.8 m)	180 lb (82 kg)	1992-02-20	Montreal, Quebec	Hawkesbury (CCHL)
57		Brice Geoffrion	Senior	F	6' 0" (1.83 m)	190 lb (86 kg)	1990-11-04	Brentwood, Tennessee	Motor City (NAHL)

== Regular season ==
=== Schedule ===
- Green background indicates win.
- Red background indicates loss.
- Yellow background indicates tie.

Date	Time	Opponent	Site	Decision	Result	Attendance	Record
October 11	6:00 pm	at Northeastern*	Matthews Arena • Boston, Massachusetts	Larose	L 1–9	2,487	0–1–0
October 12	6:00 pm	at Northeastern*	Matthews Arena • Boston, Massachusetts	Guerriero	L 2–3	1,979	0–2–0
October 25	7:07 pm	Bemidji State	Von Braun Center • Huntsville, Alabama	Larose	L 1–6	2,217	0–3–0 (0–1–0)
October 26	7:07 pm	Bemidji State	Von Braun Center • Huntsville, Alabama	Guerriero	L 0–1	1,517	0–4–0 (0–2–0)
November 1	7:07 pm	Ferris State	Von Braun Center • Huntsville, Alabama	Guerriero	L 0–5	1,562	0–5–0 (0–3–0)
November 2	7:07 pm	Ferris State	Von Braun Center • Huntsville, Alabama	Larose	L 2–3	1,320	0–6–0 (0–4–0)
November 8	10:07 pm	at Alaska–Anchorage	Sullivan Arena • Anchorage, Alaska	Guerriero	L 1–3	2,106	0–7–0 (0–5–0)
November 9	10:07 pm	at Alaska–Anchorage	Sullivan Arena • Anchorage, Alaska	Larose	L 1–6	2,256	0–8–0 (0–6–0)
November 15	7:07 pm	#3 St. Cloud State*	Von Braun Center • Huntsville, Alabama	Guerriero	L 0–10	1,824	0–9–0 (0–6–0)
November 16	7:07 pm	#3 St. Cloud State*	Von Braun Center • Huntsville, Alabama	Larose	L 3–4	1,508	0–10–0 (0–6–0)
November 22	6:07 pm	at Northern Michigan	Berry Events Center • Marquette, Michigan	Larose	L 0–3	1,873	0–11–0 (0–7–0)
November 23	6:07 pm	at Northern Michigan	Berry Events Center • Marquette, Michigan	Guerriero	L 0–4	1,937	0–12–0 (0–8–0)
November 29	6:35 pm	at #11 Notre Dame*	Compton Family Ice Arena • South Bend, Indiana (Shillelagh Tournament)	Larose	L 2–5	4,613	0–13–0 (0–8–0)
November 30	3:05 pm	vs. Western Michigan*	Compton Family Ice Arena • South Bend, Indiana (Shillelagh Tournament)	Guerriero	L 0–1	4,416	0–14–0 (0–8–0)
December 6	6:07 pm	at Bowling Green	BGSU Ice Arena • Bowling Green, Ohio	Larose	L 0–3	809	0–15–0 (0–9–0)
December 7	6:07 pm	at Bowling Green	BGSU Ice Arena • Bowling Green, Ohio	Guerriero	W 4–3 ^{OT}	1,729	1–15–0 (1–9–0)
December 13	7:07 pm	Minnesota State	Von Braun Center • Huntsville, Alabama	Larose	L 1–4	1,291	1–16–0 (1–10–0)
December 14	7:07 pm	Minnesota State	Von Braun Center • Huntsville, Alabama	Guerriero	L 1–4	1,473	1–17–0 (1–11–0)
December 27	7:00 pm	at #14 Wisconsin*	Kohl Center • Madison, Wisconsin	Larose	L 0–5	9,098	1–18–0 (1–11–0)
December 28	8:00 pm	at #14 Wisconsin*	Kohl Center • Madison, Wisconsin	Guerriero	L 2–3	9,775	1–19–0 (1–11–0)
January 3	7:07 pm	Bowling Green	Von Braun Center • Huntsville, Alabama	Larose	L 0–7	1,560	1–20–0 (1–12–0)
January 4	7:07 pm	Bowling Green	Von Braun Center • Huntsville, Alabama	Guerriero	L 1–4	1,515	1–21–0 (1–13–0)
January 10	7:05 pm	at #15 Notre Dame*	Compton Family Ice Arena • South Bend, Indiana	Larose	L 1–7	4,718	1–22–0 (1–13–0)
January 11	6:05 pm	at #15 Notre Dame*	Compton Family Ice Arena • South Bend, Indiana	Guerriero	L 0–5	4,891	1–23–0 (1–13–0)
January 17	7:07 pm	Alaska–Anchorage	Von Braun Center • Huntsville, Alabama	Larose	T 1–1 ^{OT}	2,604	1–23–1 (1–13–1)
January 18	7:07 pm	Alaska–Anchorage	Von Braun Center • Huntsville, Alabama	Guerriero	L 1–4	3,614	1–24–1 (1–14–1)
January 31	10:07 pm	at Alaska	Carlson Center • Fairbanks, Alaska	Larose	L 1–6	2,528	1–25–1 (1–15–1)
February 1	10:07 pm	at Alaska	Carlson Center • Fairbanks, Alaska	Guerriero	L 1–6	2,659	1–26–1 (1–16–1)
February 7	6:07 pm	at Michigan Tech	MacInnes Student Ice Arena • Houghton, Michigan	Guerriero	L 1–4	3,089	1–27–1 (1–17–1)
February 8	4:07 pm	at Michigan Tech	MacInnes Student Ice Arena • Houghton, Michigan	Larose	L 4–10	3,203	1–28–1 (1–18–1)
February 14	7:37 pm	at Minnesota State	Verizon Wireless Center • Mankato, Minnesota	Larose	L 0–4	3,127	1–29–1 (1–19–1)
February 15	7:07 pm	at Minnesota State	Verizon Wireless Center • Mankato, Minnesota	Guerriero	L 0–4	3,987	1–30–1 (1–20–1)
February 21	7:07 pm	Lake Superior State	Von Braun Center • Huntsville, Alabama	Larose	L 1–2	2,488	1–31–1 (1–21–1)
February 22	7:07 pm	Lake Superior State	Von Braun Center • Huntsville, Alabama	Guerriero	L 2–3	2,311	1–32–1 (1–22–1)
February 28	7:37 pm	at Bemidji State	Sanford Center • Bemidji, Minnesota	Larose	W 2–1	3,587	2–32–1 (2–22–1)
March 1	7:07 pm	at Bemidji State	Sanford Center • Bemidji, Minnesota	Guerriero	L 1–4	3,680	2–33–1 (2–23–1)
March 7	7:07 pm	Northern Michigan	Von Braun Center • Huntsville, Alabama	Larose	L 1–4	2,704	2–34–1 (2–24–1)
March 8	7:07 pm	Northern Michigan	Von Braun Center • Huntsville, Alabama	Groh	L 2–5	2,619	2–35–1 (2–25–1)
*Non-conference game. All times are in Central Time.

=== Standings ===
2013–14 Western Collegiate Hockey Association standings
	Conference record							Overall record					
	GP	W	L	T	PTS	GF	GA	GP	W	L	T	GF	GA
#6 Ferris State^{†}	28	20	6	2	42	92	62	43	29	11	3	138	94
#11 Minnesota State*	28	20	7	1	41	95	58	41	26	14	1	130	95
Alaska	28	14	12	2	30	97	77	37	18	15	4	126	103
Bowling Green	28	13	11	4	30	89	73	39	18	15	6	119	104
Michigan Tech	28	12	11	5	29	78	78	40	14	19	7	99	108
Alaska–Anchorage	28	12	12	4	28	74	77	38	18	16	4	105	107
Northern Michigan	28	13	14	1	27	77	75	38	15	21	2	102	108
Bemidji State	28	10	14	4	24	72	76	38	10	21	7	92	118
Lake Superior State	28	12	16	0	24	70	84	36	16	19	1	94	114
Alabama–Huntsville	28	2	25	1	5	30	114	38	2	35	1	41	166
Championship: Minnesota State † indicates conference regular season champion (MacNaughton Cup); * indicates conference tournament champion (Broadmoor Trophy); Rankings: USCHO.com Top 20 Poll; updated March 23, 2014

== Player stats ==
As of January 18, 2014

=== Skaters ===
Player	Pos	Yr	GP	G	A	Pts	PIM	PPG	SHG	GWG
Jack Prince	F	So	33	8	5	13	6	2	0	1
Matt Salhany	F	Fr	33	5	7	12	11	0	1	0
Chad Brears	F	So	35	6	4	10	21	3	0	0
Steven Koshey	D	So	31	1	9	10	8	1	0	0
Alex Allan	F	Sr	35	4	3	7	14	1	1	0
Frank Misuraca	D	So	36	2	5	7	29	0	0	1
Regan Soquila	F	Fr	37	2	5	7	27	0	0	0
Jeff Vanderlugt	F	Jr	22	5	0	5	30	2	0	0
Brent Fletcher	F	Fr	37	2	3	5	25	0	0	0
Brandon Clowes	F	Fr	25	1	4	5	21	0	0	0
Doug Reid	F	Jr	36	0	5	5	12	0	0	0
Cody Marooney	F	Fr	38	2	2	4	52	2	0	0
Brandon Carlson	D	Fr	36	1	3	4	22	1	0	0
Craig Pierce	F	Jr	31	0	4	4	6	0	0	0
Stephen McKenna	F	Fr	26	2	1	3	16	0	0	0
Joakim Broberg	F	Fr	21	0	3	3	16	0	0	0
Graeme Strukoff	D	Jr	33	0	3	3	30	0	0	0
Ben Reinhardt	D	Jr	36	0	3	3	23	0	0	0
Wade Schools	D	Fr	25	0	2	2	30	0	0	0
Anderson White	D	So	32	0	1	1	30	0	0	0
C.J. Groh	G	Sr	2	0	0	0	0	0	0	0
Mat Hagen	D	Sr	3	0	0	0	0	0	0	0
Jamie Kendra	F	So	12	0	0	0	2	0	0	0
Matt Larose	G	Fr	20	0	0	0	0	0	0	0
Carmine Guerriero	G	Fr	21	0	0	0	0	0	0	0
Brice Geoffrion	F	Sr	31	0	0	0	10	0	0	0
Team			38	41	72	113	443	12	2	2

=== Goaltenders ===
Player	Yr	GP	TOI	W	L	T	GA	GAA	SV	SV%	SO
Carmine Guerriero	Fr	21	1106:36	1	17	0	72	3.90	686	0.905	0
Matt Larose	Fr	20	1080:05	1	17	1	85	4.72	676	0.888	0
C.J. Groh	Sr	2	88:26	0	1	0	8	5.39	46	0.852	0
