= 2014 WCHA men's ice hockey tournament =

2014 WCHA Men's ice hockey tournament
- Dates: March 13–22, 2014
- Teams: 8
- Finals site: Van Andel Arena; Grand Rapids, Michigan
- Champions: Minnesota State (1st title)
- Winning coach: Mike Hastings (1st title)
- MVP: Cole Huggins (Minnesota State)
- WCHA Men's Ice Hockey Tournaments

The 2014 WCHA Men's Ice Hockey Tournament was the 55th conference playoff in league history and 60th season where a WCHA champion was crowned. The 2014 tournament was played between March 13 and March 22, 2014, at four conference arenas and the Xcel Energy Center in St. Paul, Minnesota. By winning the tournament, Minnesota State received the Broadmoor Trophy and was awarded the Western Collegiate Hockey Association's automatic bid to the 2014 NCAA Division I Men's Ice Hockey Tournament.

== Format ==
The first round of the postseason tournament features a best-of-three games format. The top eight or ten conference teams participate in the tournament. Teams are seeded No. 1 through No. 8 according to their final conference standing, with a tiebreaker system used to seed teams with an identical number of points accumulated. The top four seeded teams each earn home ice and host one of the lower seeded teams.

The winners of the first round series advance to the Van Andel Arena for the WCHA Final Five, a holdover from previous tournaments where it was used as the collective name of the quarterfinal, semifinal, and championship rounds. The Final Five uses a single-elimination format. Teams are re-seeded No. 1 through No. 4 according to the final regular season conference standings.

=== Conference standings ===
Note: GP = Games played; W = Wins; L = Losses; T = Ties; PTS = Points; GF = Goals For; GA = Goals Against

2013–14 Western Collegiate Hockey Association standings
	Conference record							Overall record					
	GP	W	L	T	PTS	GF	GA	GP	W	L	T	GF	GA
#6 Ferris State^{†}	28	20	6	2	42	92	62	43	29	11	3	138	94
#11 Minnesota State*	28	20	7	1	41	95	58	41	26	14	1	130	95
Alaska	28	14	12	2	30	97	77	37	18	15	4	126	103
Bowling Green	28	13	11	4	30	89	73	39	18	15	6	119	104
Michigan Tech	28	12	11	5	29	78	78	40	14	19	7	99	108
Alaska–Anchorage	28	12	12	4	28	74	77	38	18	16	4	105	107
Northern Michigan	28	13	14	1	27	77	75	38	15	21	2	102	108
Bemidji State	28	10	14	4	24	72	76	38	10	21	7	92	118
Lake Superior State	28	12	16	0	24	70	84	36	16	19	1	94	114
Alabama–Huntsville	28	2	25	1	5	30	114	38	2	35	1	41	166
Championship: Minnesota State † indicates conference regular season champion (MacNaughton Cup); * indicates conference tournament champion (Broadmoor Trophy); Rankings: USCHO.com Top 20 Poll; updated March 23, 2014

== Bracket ==
Teams are reseeded after the first round

First round March 13–15
1	Ferris State	8	3**	—
8	Bemidji State	0	2	—
2	Minnesota State	3	5*	—
7	Northern Michigan	2	4	—
(Pairings are reseeded after the first round)
3	Alaska	3*	1	4
6	Alaska–Anchorage	2	2	5
4	Bowling Green	2	5	—
5	Michigan Tech	1	2	—

Semifinals; March 21
1	Ferris State	5*
6	Alaska–Anchorage	4
2	Minnesota State	4
4	Bowling Green	0

Championship; March 22
1	Ferris State	1
2	Minnesota State	4

Note: * denotes overtime periods

== Results ==
=== First round ===
All times are local.

==== (1) Ferris State vs. (8) Bemidji State ====
March 14	Ferris State	8–0	Bemidji State	Ewigleben Arena	Recap
Justin Buzzeo (12) - (Thompson, Czarnowczan) - 10:47; Kyle Schempp (9) - (DeMartino) - 12:33		First period	No scoring
Travis White (3) - (Babinski, Robertson) - 10:59; Justin Buzzeo (13) - (Thompson, Kane) - 16:15		Second period	No scoring
Kyle Schempp (10) - (White, Czarnowczan) - 5:23; Cory Kane (13) - (Huff, Mayhew) - 5:58; Kenny Babinski (9) - (Robertson, McDonald) - 12:47; Andy Huff (10) - (Kane, White) - 13:49		Third period	No scoring
C. J. Motte ( 26 saves / 26 shots )		Goalie stats	Andrew Walsh ( 15 saves / 23 shots ) / Jesse Wilkins ( 0 saves / 0 shots )

March 15	Ferris State	3–2	2OT	Bemidji State	Ewigleben Arena	Recap
Brandon Anselmini (5) - (Binkley, Buzzeo) - 3:50		First period		No scoring
No scoring		Second period		Phil Brewer (2) - (Ward) - 1:17; Nate Arentz (3) - (Illo, Harms) - 6:17
Matt Robertson (12) - en - (Lowney, McDonald) - 19:15		Third period		No scoring
Scott Czarnowczan (6) - sh - (White, Thompson) - 5:15		Second overtime period		No scoring
C. J. Motte ( 34 saves / 36 shots )		Goalie stats		Jesse Wilkins ( 38 saves / 41 shots )

Ferris State wins series 2–0

==== (2) Minnesota State vs. (7) Northern Michigan ====
March 14	Minnesota State	3–2	Northern Michigan	Verizon Wireless Center	Recap
Matt Leitner (10) - (Nelson, Gervais) - 3:44		First period	No scoring
Bryce Gervais (13) - pp - (Bļugers, Stepan) - 4:24; Sean Flanagan (6) - pp - (Stepan, Bļugers) - 8:23		Second period	Shane Sooth (4) - (Shine, Maschmeyer) - 15:01
No scoring		Third period	Brock Maschmeyer (5) - pp - (Vigier) - 3:32
Cole Huggins ( 16 saves / 18 shots )		Goalie stats	Mathias Dahlstrom ( 22 saves / 25 shots )

March 15	Minnesota State	5–4	OT	Northern Michigan	Verizon Wireless Center	Recap
Matt Leitner (11) - (Gervais, Huggins) - 19:59		First period		Jake Johnson (3) - (Kesti) - 7:18
Johnny McInnis (20) - pp - (Bļugers, Stepan) - 14:00		Second period		Ryan Kesti (4) - (Shine) - 3:21
Bryce Gervais (14) - (Leitner, Grant) - 7:22; Bryce Gervais (15) - pp - (Palmquist, Stepan) - 15:37		Third period		Stephan Vigier (16) - pp - (Maschmeyer, Sooth) - 4:44; Brock Maschmeyer (6) - pp - (Jones, Vigier) - 12:11
Zach Stepan (8) - (Palmquist, McInnis) - 16:32		First overtime period		No scoring
Cole Huggins ( 28 saves / 32 shots )		Goalie stats		Mathias Dahlstrom ( 53 saves / 58 shots )

Minnesota State wins series 2–0

==== (3) Alaska vs. (6) Alaska–Anchorage ====
March 13	Alaska	3–2	OT	Alaska–Anchorage	Carlson Center	Recap
No scoring		First period		No scoring
Justin Woods (1) (Youngmun, Hochhausen) - 11:59		Second period		Tanner Dusyk (2) - (unassisted) - 2:44
Marcus Basara (12) - PP - (Atkinson) - 13:54		Third period		Blake Tatchell (8) - (unassisted) - 6:24
Colton Beck (14) - (Basara, Woods) - 3:40		First overtime period		No scoring
Sean Cahill ( 20 saves / 22 shots )		Goalie stats		Rob Gunderson ( 27 saves / 30 shots )

March 14	Alaska	1–2	Alaska–Anchorage	Carlson Center	Recap
Colton Parayko (5) - (Beck, Quinn) - 19:31		First period	No scoring
No scoring		Second period	Matt Bailey (19) - (Allen) - 2:59; Brad Duwe (6) - (Tatchell, Kwas) - 4:27
No scoring		Third period	No scoring
Sean Cahill ( 22 saves / 24 shots )		Goalie stats	Rob Gunderson ( 25 saves / 26 shots )

March 15	Alaska	4–5	Alaska–Anchorage	Carlson Center	Recap
No scoring		First period	No scoring
Colton Parayko (6) - PP - (Kunyk, Beck) - 16:04		Second period	Jordan Kwas (13) - (Cameron, Tatchell) - 1:09; Matt Bailey (20) - (Allen) - 5:00; Scott Allen (17) - (Matt Bailey) - 19:46
Alec Hajdukovich (3) - (Morley, Quinn) - 5:04; Colton Parayko (7) - (Woods, Perry) - 10:19; Alec Hajdukovich (4) - (Quinn, Perry) - 14:47		Third period	Austin Coldwell (5) - (Cameron, Tatchell) - 13:23; Brad Duwe (7) - (Tatchell, Kwas) - 17:15
Sean Cahill ( 17 saves / 22 shots )		Goalie stats	Rob Gunderson ( 24 saves / 28 shots )

Alaska–Anchorage wins series 2–1

==== (4) Bowling Green vs. (5) Michigan Tech ====
March 14	Bowling Green	2–1	Michigan Tech	BGSU Ice Arena	Recap
Bryce Williamson (12) - pp - (Freibergs, DeSalvo) - 5:55; Ryan Carpenter (7) - (Pohlkamp, Mercier) - 11:52		First period	David Johnstone (11) - pp - (Hanna, Petan) - 10:12
No scoring		Second period	No scoring
No scoring		Third period	No scoring
Tommy Burke ( 24 saves / 25 shots )		Goalie stats	Pheonix Copley ( 22 saves / 24 shots )

March 15	Bowling Green	5–2	Michigan Tech	BGSU Ice Arena	Recap
Matt Pohlkamp (9) - (Carpenter, Sullivan) - 14:35; Adam Berkle (9) - pp - (Carpenter, DeSalvo) - 19:01		First period	No scoring
Marcus Perrier (2) - (DeSalvo, Mercier) - 13:30		Second period	No scoring
Ryan Carpenter (8) - (Williamson, Murphy) - 2:11; Adam Berkle (10) - en - (Carpenter, DeSalvo) - 18:26		Third period	Reid Sturos (8) - pp - (Petan, Pietila) - 0:29; Malcolm Gould (6) - (Johnstone) - 8:42
Tommy Burke ( 28 saves / 30 shots )		Goalie stats	Pheonix Copley ( 29 saves / 33 shots )

Bowling Green wins series 2–0

=== Semifinals ===
All times are local (UTC−4).

==== (2) Minnesota State vs. (4) Bowling Green ====
March 21	Minnesota State	4–0	Bowling Green	Van Andel Arena	Recap
No scoring		First period	No scoring
Chase Grant (9) - (Leitner, Gervais) - 3:52; Bryce Gervais (16) - sh - (unassisted) - 12:47		Second period	No scoring
Johnny McInnis (21) - (Bļugers)) - 10:47; Matt Leitner (12) - en - (Gervais) - 18:28		Third period	No scoring
Cole Huggins ( 36 saves / 36 shots )		Goalie stats	Tommy Burke ( 32 saves / 35 shots )

==== (1) Ferris State vs. (6) Alaska–Anchorage ====
March 21	Ferris State	5–4	OT	Alaska–Anchorage	Van Andel Arena	Recap
Gerald Mayhew (5) - pp - (Kane) - 4:41; Justin Buzzeo (14) - (Thompson, Anselmini) - 6:31		First period		Brett Cameron (10) - (Coldwell, Leask) - 8:54
Garrett Thompson (16) - (Buzzeo, Czarnowczan) - 12:50; Andy Huff (11) - (Binkley, Lowney) - 15:29		Second period		Austin Coldwell (6) - (Kwas, Tatchell) - 7:16; Zack Rassell (3) - (Hubbs, Pettitt) - 8:56; Hudson Friesen (3) - (Dusyk, Trupp) - 11:22
No scoring		Third period		No scoring
Gerald Mayhew (6) - (Kane) - 2:38		First overtime period		No scoring
C.J. Motte ( 34 saves / 38 shots )		Goalie stats		Rob Gunderson ( 8 saves / 12 shots ) Chris Kamal ( 10 saves / 11 shots )

=== Championship ===
All times are local (UTC−4).

==== (1) Ferris State vs. (2) Minnesota State ====
March 22	Ferris State	1–4	Minnesota State	Van Andel Arena	Recap
No scoring		First period	Michael Huntebrinker (2) - (Lehrke, Lafontaine) - 9:13; Brett Stern (1) - (Bļugers, Nelson) - 13:50
Gerald Mayhew (7) - (Huff, Kane) - 19:14		Second period	No scoring
No scoring		Third period	Brett Knowles (1) - (Bļugers) - 8:38; Teodors Bļugers (4) - en - (Leitner) - 19:56
C.J. Motte ( 28 saves / 31 shots )		Goalie stats	Cole Huggins ( 25 saves / 26 shots )

== Tournament awards ==
=== All-Tournament Team ===
- F Teodors Bļugers (Minnesota State)
- F Bryce Gervais (Minnesota State)
- F Gerald Mayhew (Ferris State)
- D Austin Coldwell (Alaska-Anchorage)
- D Brett Stern (Minnesota State)
- G Cole Huggins* (Minnesota State)

* Most Valuable Player(s)
