= Michael Bitzer =

American ice hockey player (born 1993)

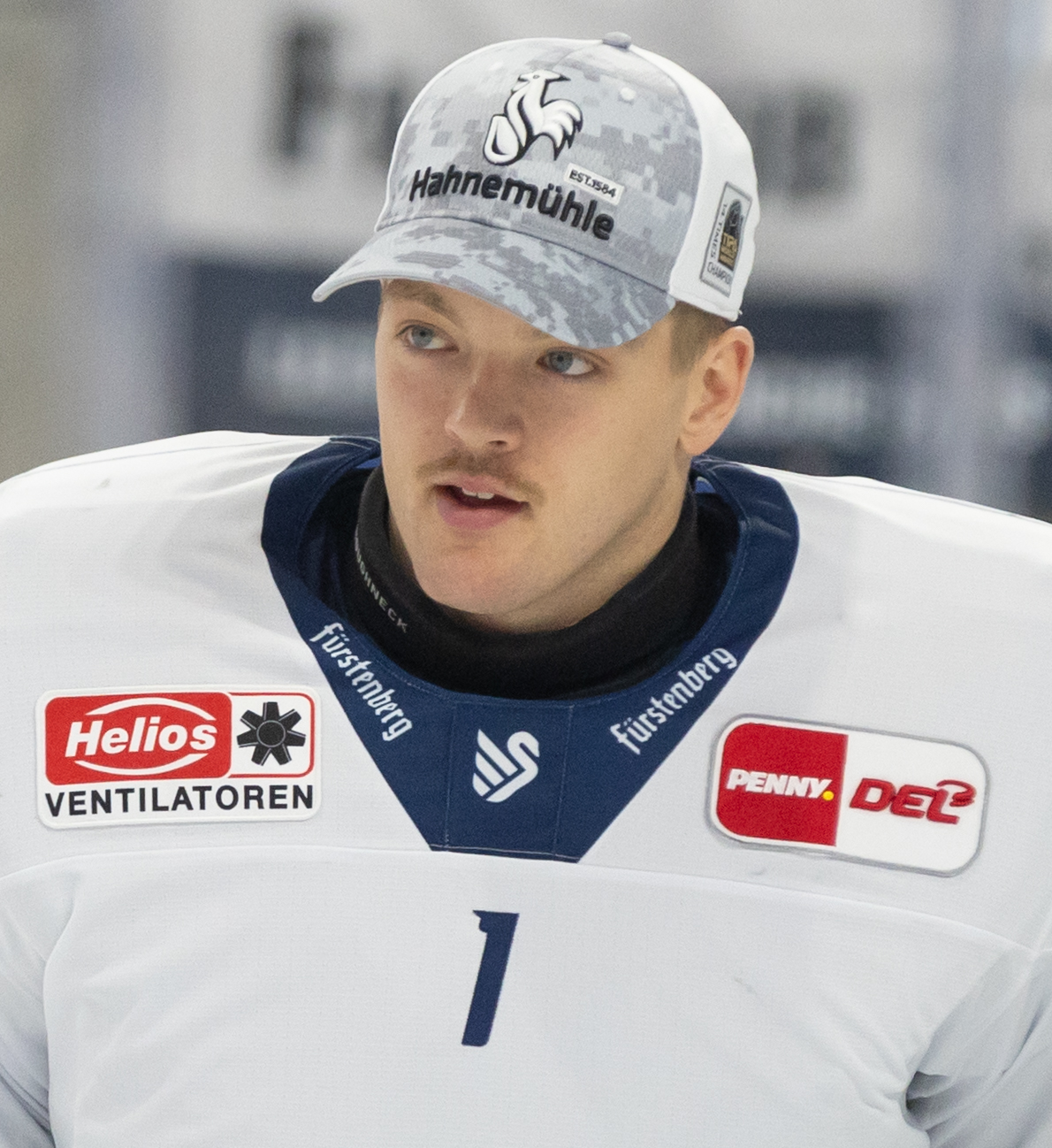
- Bitzer with the Schwenninger Wild Wings in 2025
- Born: October 23, 1993 (age 32) Moorhead, Minnesota, U.S.
- Height: 5 ft 11 in (180 cm)
- Weight: 192 lb (87 kg; 13 st 10 lb)
- Position: Goaltender
- Catches: Left
- DEL team Former teams: Schwenninger Wild Wings; Idaho Steelheads; Rapid City Rush; Atlanta Gladiators; Bietigheim Steelers
- NHL draft: Undrafted
- Playing career: 2018–present

Michael Bitzer (born October 23, 1993) is a German-American professional ice hockey goaltender currently playing for the Schwenninger Wild Wings of the Deutsche Eishockey Liga (DEL). He was an All-American for Bemidji State.

== Playing career ==
After graduating from Moorhead High School, Bitzer played two seasons of junior hockey for the Lincoln Stars. He put up respectable if unspectacular numbers but was able to earn a scholarship to Bemidji State University. As soon as he debuted for the Beavers, Bitzer began to rewrite their record book. He finished 4th in the nation for goals against average as a freshman and was named as the WCHA Rookie of the Year, the only Beaver so honored. Both he and Bemidji State regressed slightly during his sophomore year but Bitzer rebounded in spectacular fashion as a junior. He posted some of the best goaltending numbers for the season and was named as a first team All-American. He led Bemidji State to a first-place finish in the WCHA and was named the league Player of the Year. Unfortunately, BSU lost in the conference semifinals and was left out of the NCAA Tournament.

After wrapping up his college career with a solid senior season, Bitzer signed with the Idaho Steelheads for the remainder of the 2018 season. That offseason, he signed with the Rapid City Rush but his tenure there proved to be short-lived. Bitzer did not perform well in his first full season as a pro and found himself relegated to being the team's third goaltender. On New Years Day, he was traded to the Atlanta Gladiators as a fulfilment of a previous trade. He improved a bit with his new surroundings but he was limited to just 9 games over the final three months of the season.

After the disappointing year, Bitzer travelled to Germany and spent two years with ETC Crimmitschau in the second German league. In October 2021, Bitzer signed a contract with the Wichita Thunder and was expecting to return to the ECHL. The arrangement ended up falling through, however, and Bitzer remained in Germany. He ended up signing with Selber Wölfe, who had just received a promotion to DEL2 from the Oberliga.

== Career statistics ==
=== Regular season and playoffs ===
| | | | Regular season | | | | | | | | | Playoffs |
| Season | Team | League | GP | W | L | T | MIN | GA | SO | GAA | SV% | GP | W | L | MIN | GA | SO | GAA | SV% |
|---|---|---|---|---|---|---|---|---|---|---|---|---|---|---|---|---|---|---|---|
| 2007–08 | Moorhead High School | MN-HS | 8 | 4 | 2 | 1 | – | – | 2 | 2.27 | .902 | — | — | — | — | — | — | — | — |
| 2008–09 | Moorhead High School | MN-HS | 8 | 7 | 0 | 0 | – | – | 2 | 1.98 | .910 | — | — | — | — | — | — | — | — |
| 2009–10 | Moorhead High School | MN-HS | 10 | 5 | 2 | 0 | – | – | 3 | 1.87 | .920 | 2 | 1 | 1 | — | 2 | 1 | 1.00 | .955 |
| 2010–11 | Moorhead High School | MN-HS | 24 | 15 | 7 | 2 | – | – | 3 | 2.06 | .930 | 5 | 3 | 2 | — | — | 1 | 1.41 | .931 |
| 2011–12 | Moorhead High School | MN-HS | 24 | 18 | 6 | 0 | – | – | 5 | 2.02 | .927 | 6 | 4 | 2 | — | 5 | 2 | 0.88 | .963 |
| 2011–12 | Alexandria Blizzard | NAHL | 4 | 3 | 0 | 1 | 241 | 8 | 1 | 2.00 | .915 | 2 | 1 | 1 | — | 3 | 1 | 1.50 | .958 |
| 2012–13 | Lincoln Stars | USHL | 38 | 22 | 11 | 1 | 2023 | 91 | 1 | 2.70 | .905 | 4 | 2 | 2 | — | 4 | 1 | 1.01 | .972 |
| 2013–14 | Lincoln Stars | USHL | 51 | 19 | 19 | 6 | 2801 | 148 | 0 | 3.17 | .903 | — | — | — | — | — | — | — | — |
| 2014–15 | Bemidji State | WCHA | 28 | 14 | 11 | 3 | 1730 | 52 | 4 | 1.80 | .929 | — | — | — | — | — | — | — | — |
| 2015–16 | Bemidji State | WCHA | 34 | 13 | 16 | 5 | 1946 | 70 | 6 | 2.16 | .915 | — | — | — | — | — | — | — | — |
| 2016–17 | Bemidji State | WCHA | 39 | 22 | 14 | 3 | 2355 | 67 | 6 | 1.71 | .932 | — | — | — | — | — | — | — | — |
| 2017–18 | Bemidji State | WCHA | 37 | 16 | 13 | 8 | 2196 | 82 | 5 | 2.24 | .909 | — | — | — | — | — | — | — | — |
| 2017–18 | Idaho Steelheads | ECHL | 3 | 2 | 1 | 0 | 183 | 7 | 0 | 2.30 | .887 | — | — | — | — | — | — | — | — |
| 2018–19 | Rapid City Rush | ECHL | 12 | 3 | 6 | 1 | 594 | 36 | 0 | 3.64 | .882 | — | — | — | — | — | — | — | — |
| 2018–19 | Atlanta Gladiators | ECHL | 9 | 3 | 3 | 1 | 440 | 24 | 1 | 3.27 | .887 | — | — | — | — | — | — | — | — |
| 2019–20 | ETC Crimmitschau | DEL2 | 43 | 19 | 24 | 0 | 2587 | 147 | 0 | 3.41 | .889 | — | — | — | — | — | — | — | — |
| 2020–21 | ETC Crimmitschau | DEL2 | 29 | 16 | 11 | 0 | 1684 | 88 | 1 | 3.14 | .897 | — | — | — | — | — | — | — | — |
| 2021–22 | Selber Wölfe | DEL2 | 22 | 3 | 18 | 0 | 1259 | 65 | 1 | 3.10 | .914 | — | — | — | — | — | — | — | — |
| 2021–22 | Bietigheim Steelers | DEL | 1 | 0 | 1 | 0 | 59 | 4 | 0 | 4.08 | .878 | — | — | — | — | — | — | — | — |
| 2022–23 | Selber Wölfe | DEL2 | 36 | 16 | 19 | 0 | 2029 | 105 | 2 | 3.10 | .916 | — | — | — | — | — | — | — | — |
| 2023–24 | Selber Wölfe | DEL2 | 37 | 13 | 20 | 0 | 2142 | 105 | 2 | 2.94 | .921 | — | — | — | — | — | — | — | — |
| 2024–25 | Schwenninger Wild Wings | DEL | 14 | 5 | 7 | 0 | 774 | 42 | 1 | 3.26 | .880 | — | — | — | — | — | — | — | — |
| ECHL totals | | | 24 | 8 | 10 | 2 | 1,217 | 67 | 1 | 3.30 | .884 | — | — | — | — | — | — | — | — |
| DEL totals | | | 15 | 5 | 8 | 0 | 833 | 46 | 1 | 3.31 | .880 | — | — | — | — | — | — | — | — |

== Awards and honors ==
| Award | Year |
|---|---|
| WCHA All-Rookie Team | 2014–15 |
| All-WCHA First Team | 2016–17 |
| AHCA West First Team All-American | 2016–17 |
| All-WCHA Second Team | 2017–18 |

Awards and achievements
| Preceded by Alex Globke | WCHA Rookie of the Year; 2014–15 | Succeeded by Corey Mackin |
| Preceded by Cole Huggins | WCHA Goaltending Champion; 2016–17 | Succeeded by Award Discontinued |
| Preceded by Alex Petan | WCHA Player of the Year; 2016–17 | Succeeded by C. J. Suess |
