= Joel L'Esperance =

American ice hockey player (born 1995)

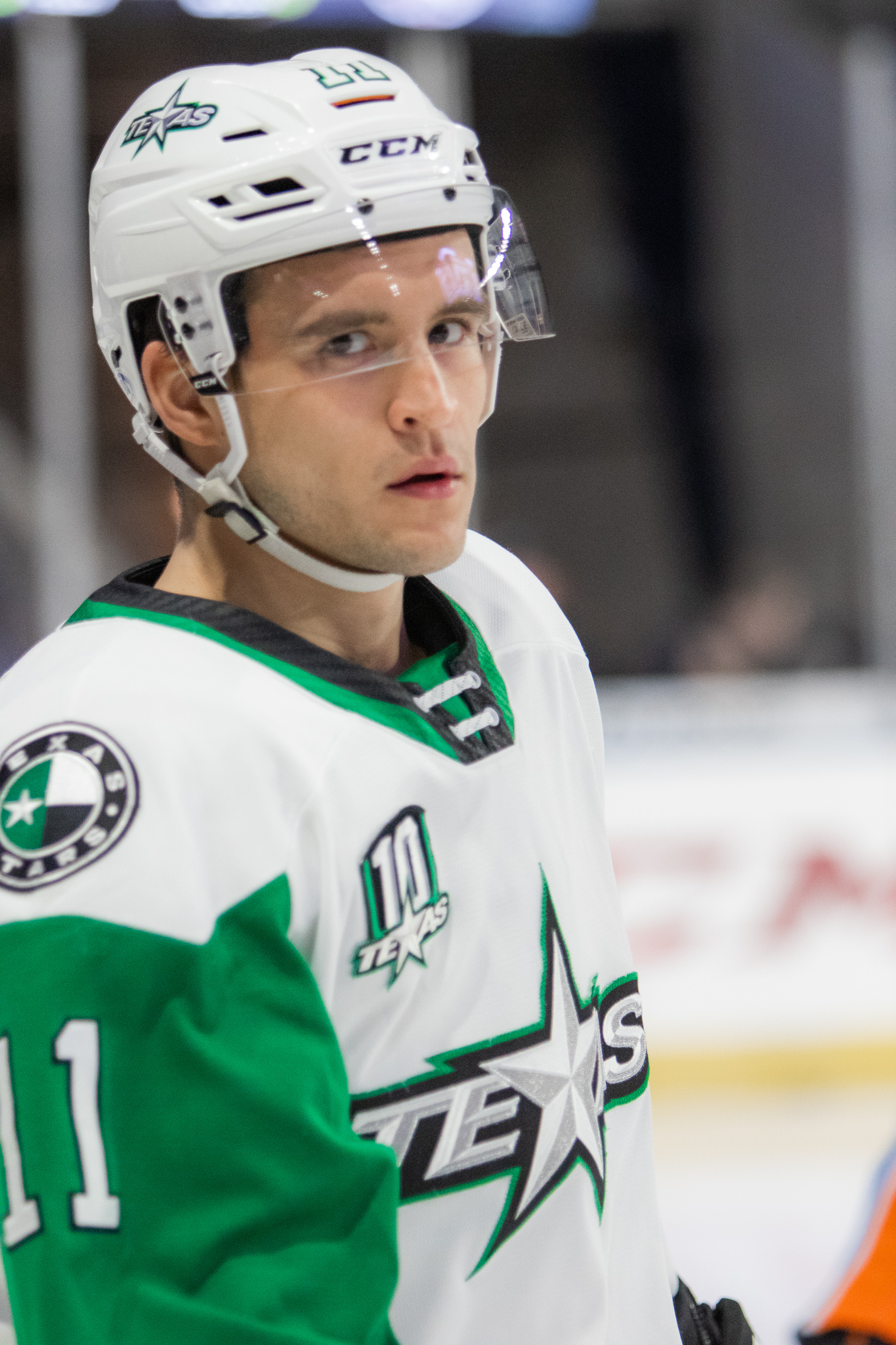
- L'Esperance with the Texas Stars in 2019
- Born: August 18, 1995 (age 30) Brighton, Michigan, U.S.
- Height: 6 ft 2 in (188 cm)
- Weight: 210 lb (95 kg; 15 st 0 lb)
- Position: Center
- Shot: Right
- team Former teams: Free agent Dallas Stars
- NHL draft: Undrafted
- Playing career: 2018–2024

Joel David L'Esperance (born August 18, 1995) is a former American professional ice hockey forward. He most recently played for the Grand Rapids Griffins of the American Hockey League (AHL).

== Playing career ==
=== Amateur ===
L'Esperance as a Brighton, Michigan native, first played as a junior with the Detroit Compuware program through to the under-16 level. He was originally selected 41st overall in the 2011 United States Hockey League Futures Draft, however signed with the Tri-City Storm for the 2011–12 season.

He tallied 67 points in 111 career games in the USHL for the Storm and Sioux City Musketeers from 2011 to 2014 before committing to play collegiate hockey with Michigan Tech of the Western Collegiate Hockey Association (WCHA).

L'Esperance played four full seasons with the Huskies, potting 46 goals and 98 points through 158 games, helping the Michigan Tech claim the WCHA Championship in back-to-back seasons during his junior and senior years. Adding 27 points in 44 games as a Senior in the 2017–18 season, L'Esperance immediately embarked on his professional career by agreeing to an amateur try-out with the Texas Stars of the American Hockey League on March 27, 2018.

=== Professional ===
Joining Texas in their push to the post-season, L'Esperance made his debut the following day in a 3–2 shootout loss to the Grand Rapids Griffins on March 28, 2018. He later added his first professional goal in a 4–3 victory over the Rockford IceHogs on April 7, 2018. Registering 2 points in 9 regular season games, L'Esperance established a role in the playoffs appearing in all 22 postseason contests with Texas, recording four points in his first trip to the Calder Cup finals, before losing to the Toronto Marlies in seven games.

Undrafted, L'Esperance impressed with his growth in development through his senior year with the Huskies and try-out with Texas and was rewarded as a free agent with a two-year, entry-level contract with the Dallas Stars on July 2, 2018. After attending the Stars 2018 training camp, he was reassigned to begin the 2018–19 season with the Texas Stars. L'Esperance made an immediate impact with Texas, finding his scoring touch to impressively lead the league as a rookie in goals with 27 in 49 games earning a selection to the AHL All-Star Classic before receiving his first recall to the NHL on February 14, 2019. He made his NHL debut with the Stars, playing 15 minutes, in a 3–0 defeat to the Carolina Hurricanes at the PNC Arena in Raleigh, North Carolina on February 15, 2019. During the 2021–22 season he recorded a career-high 49 points on 24 goals and 25 assists in 62 games for the Texas Stars. In four seasons in the AHL with the Stars, he recorded 80 goals, 56 assists and 92 penalty minutes in 183 games.

On July 13, 2022, L'Esperance signed a two-year AHL contract with the Grand Rapids Griffins.

March 17, 2025, Joel announced his retirement from professional hockey.

== Career statistics ==
			Regular season					Playoffs
Season	Team	League	GP	G	A	Pts	PIM	GP	G	A	Pts	PIM
2011–12	Tri-City Storm	USHL	2	0	0	0	0	—	—	—	—	—
2012–13	Tri-City Storm	USHL	49	10	9	19	57	—	—	—	—	—
2013–14	Tri-City Storm	USHL	35	21	13	34	28	—	—	—	—	—
2013–14	Sioux City Musketeers	USHL	25	6	8	14	16	8	1	0	1	10
2014–15	Michigan Tech	WCHA	29	7	10	17	18	—	—	—	—	—
2015–16	Michigan Tech	WCHA	35	16	10	26	16	—	—	—	—	—
2016–17	Michigan Tech	WCHA	44	11	17	28	53	—	—	—	—	—
2017–18	Michigan Tech	WCHA	44	12	15	27	45	—	—	—	—	—
2017–18	Texas Stars	AHL	9	1	1	2	0	22	1	3	4	4
2018–19	Texas Stars	AHL	54	30	15	45	23	—	—	—	—	—
2018–19	Dallas Stars	NHL	18	2	0	2	6	—	—	—	—	—
2019–20	Texas Stars	AHL	58	25	15	40	39	—	—	—	—	—
2019–20	Dallas Stars	NHL	3	1	0	1	2	—	—	—	—	—
2020–21	Dallas Stars	NHL	12	2	0	2	2	—	—	—	—	—
2021–22	Texas Stars	AHL	62	24	25	49	30	2	0	1	1	0
2022–23	Grand Rapids Griffins	AHL	72	25	24	49	44	—	—	—	—	—
2023–24	Grand Rapids Griffins	AHL	59	16	12	28	32	9	2	2	4	4
NHL totals			33	5	0	5	10	—	—	—	—	—

== Awards and honours ==
Award	Year
AHL
All-Star Game	2019, 2020
