= Leo, Gerry and Myles Fitzgerald =

Canadian actors and ice hockey people

- Born: August 26, 1993 (age 33); Port Alberni, British Columbia, Canada
- Occupations: Actors, ice hockey players

Leo, Gerry and Myles Fitzgerald (born August 26, 1993) are Canadian former child actor triplets, currently involved in ice hockey, best known for their joint roles as Sylvester (Sly) and Whit in the 1999 film Baby Geniuses. They also appeared in the sequel, Superbabies: Baby Geniuses 2, in 2004.

== Ice hockey careers ==
The Fitzgerald brothers are ice hockey forwards. They played minor ice hockey in their hometown of Port Alberni, British Columbia, followed by their junior B in the Vancouver Island Junior Hockey League. They were then reunited in the British Columbia Hockey League (BCHL) with the Nanaimo Clippers, Prince George Spruce Kings, and Victoria Grizzlies.

After the triplets led the Grizzlies in scoring in the 2012–13 season, all three committed to Bemidji State University. They played college ice hockey with the Bemidji State Beavers men's ice hockey program from the 2014–15 season to the 2017–18 season.

Leo played three games for the South Carolina Stingrays of the ECHL at the end of the 2017–18 ECHL season and played in the Hungarian OB I bajnokság and Erste Liga with Ferencvárosi TC during the 2018–19 season before retiring.

Gerry played sixteen games for the Iowa Wild of the American Hockey League (AHL) at the end of the 2017–18 AHL season and remained with the team through the 2018–19 season. The following season, he played 40 games in the AHL with the Lehigh Valley Phantoms and two games in the ECHL with the Reading Royals. Since the 2020–21 season, Gerry has been active in the Swedish HockeyAllsvenskan and has played with teams including Västerviks IK, IF Björklöven, and AIK.

Myles played alongside Leo with Ferencvárosi TC in the 2018–19 season. He re-signed with Ferencvárosi for the 2019–20 season, during which he also played in the German DEL2 with the Ravensburg Towerstars and the Bietigheim Steelers. The 2020–21 season was spent in the German Oberliga with ECDC Memmingen. Myles served as an assistant coach to the Chinese women's national ice hockey team for the 2023 IIHF Women's World Championship Division I, at which China placed first and earned promotion to the Top Division.

== Filmography ==
Year	Film	Role
1999	Baby Geniuses	Sly/Whit
2004	Superbabies: Baby Geniuses 2	Kahuna
