= The Minnesota State Rouser =

The Minnesota State Rouser, also known as The Maverick Rouser, is the fight song of the Minnesota State University, Mankato. It is played at all Minnesota State Mavericks athletics games, rallies and at many alumni events. The Maverick Machine, the Minnesota State University Marching Band, plays the rouser along with other popular songs and the song of the university, the Minnesota State University Hymn.

== History ==
The Minnesota State Rouser was written as a revised version of the original song "Mankato Rouser" that was written by Kenneth Pinckney in 1948. The song was updated to reflect the name change to Minnesota State University, Mankato in 1998 and has certain emphasis on the nickname 'Minnesota State'. The tune references the latest school mascot adopted in 1977, the Maverick, a wild unbranded male steer bull and was written as a result of the winning suggestion by then Professor of Education Roy Cook.

== Lyrics ==
Hail to our colors,
The purple and the gold.
Rally for vict'ry,
We're back of you so fight, fight, fight.

You'll conquer our foes all you Mav'ricks brave and bold.
So fight on Minnesota State,
Come on let's go, let's go!

M-A-V-E-R-I-C-K-S!
MAV-'RICKS! MAV-'RICKS!
GO STATE!
