= Minnesota State University Marching Band =

College marching band in Mankato, Minnesota

Minnesota State 'Maverick Machine' Marching Band
- School: Minnesota State University, Mankato
- Location: Mankato, Minnesota, United States
- Conference: Northern Sun Intercollegiate
- Founded: 1929
- Director: Michael Thursby
- Members: 200
- Fight song: "The Minnesota State Rouser", "The Minnesota State Hymn", "Mankato War Song (Note: Similar to "You Don't Wanna Go To War" by Rebirth Brass Band, but with altered lyrics and melody.)"

Uniform
- Black and purple jacket with a splash of gold, black pants, black shakos with purple plumes, black gloves and black shoes
- Website: www.mnsu.edu/maverick-machine

The Minnesota State University Marching Band (also known as The Maverick Machine) is the marching band of Minnesota State University, Mankato. The band generates enthusiasm and excitement by promoting school spirit and morale. The group performs at home football, hockey, and basketball events. The Maverick Machine consists of five ensembles: the marching band, drumline, color guard, pep band, and the indoor winds, which is the first collegiate WGI winds group in Minnesota.

The group originally formed in 1929 as one of the first instrumental music offerings during the transition from the Mankato Normal School to the Mankato State Teachers College. The name 'Marching Machine' was added when Clayton Tiede took reins of the band in 1960. The band had a longstanding tradition of excellence crossing many decades until the 90s when budgets became tighter and transitioned to a pep band only. The current band reformed in 2013 as a result of the current director, Michael Thursby, leadership.

On average, the Maverick Machine plays at over 80 events per school year for approximately 170,000 people.

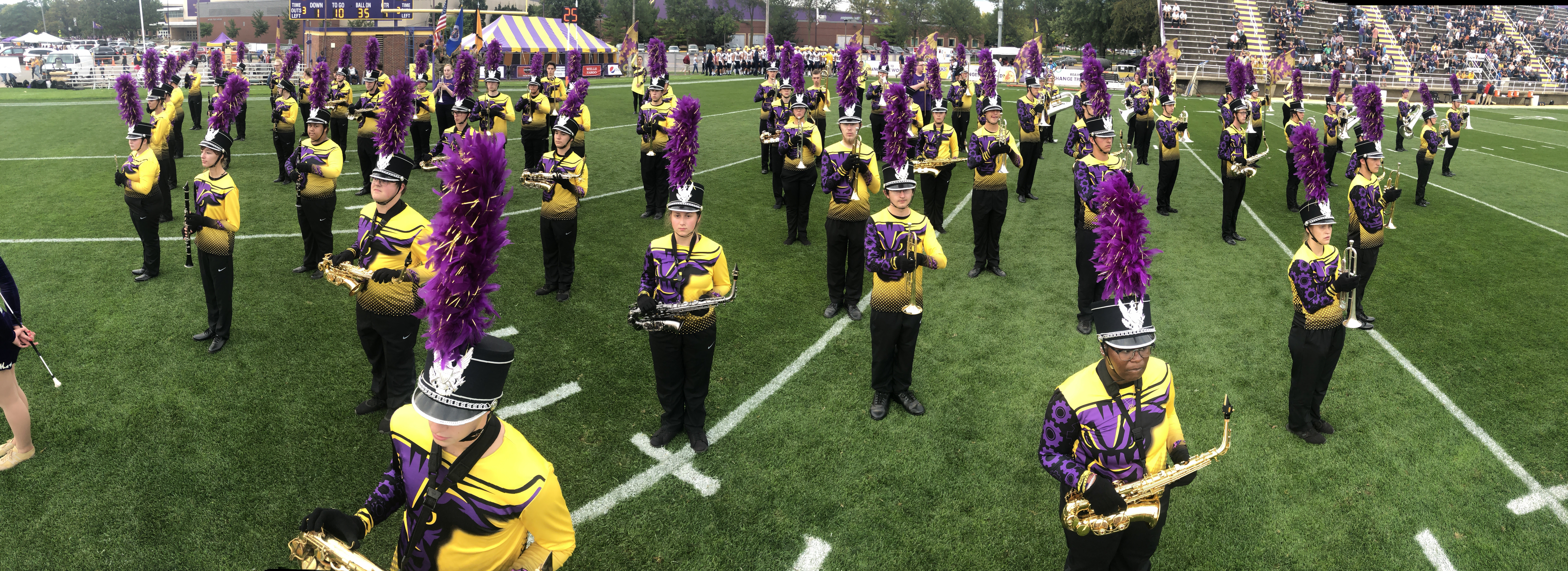
The Maverick Machine playing at a home football game at Blakeslee Stadium in the Fall of 2019.
