= Stomper the Maverick =

Stomper
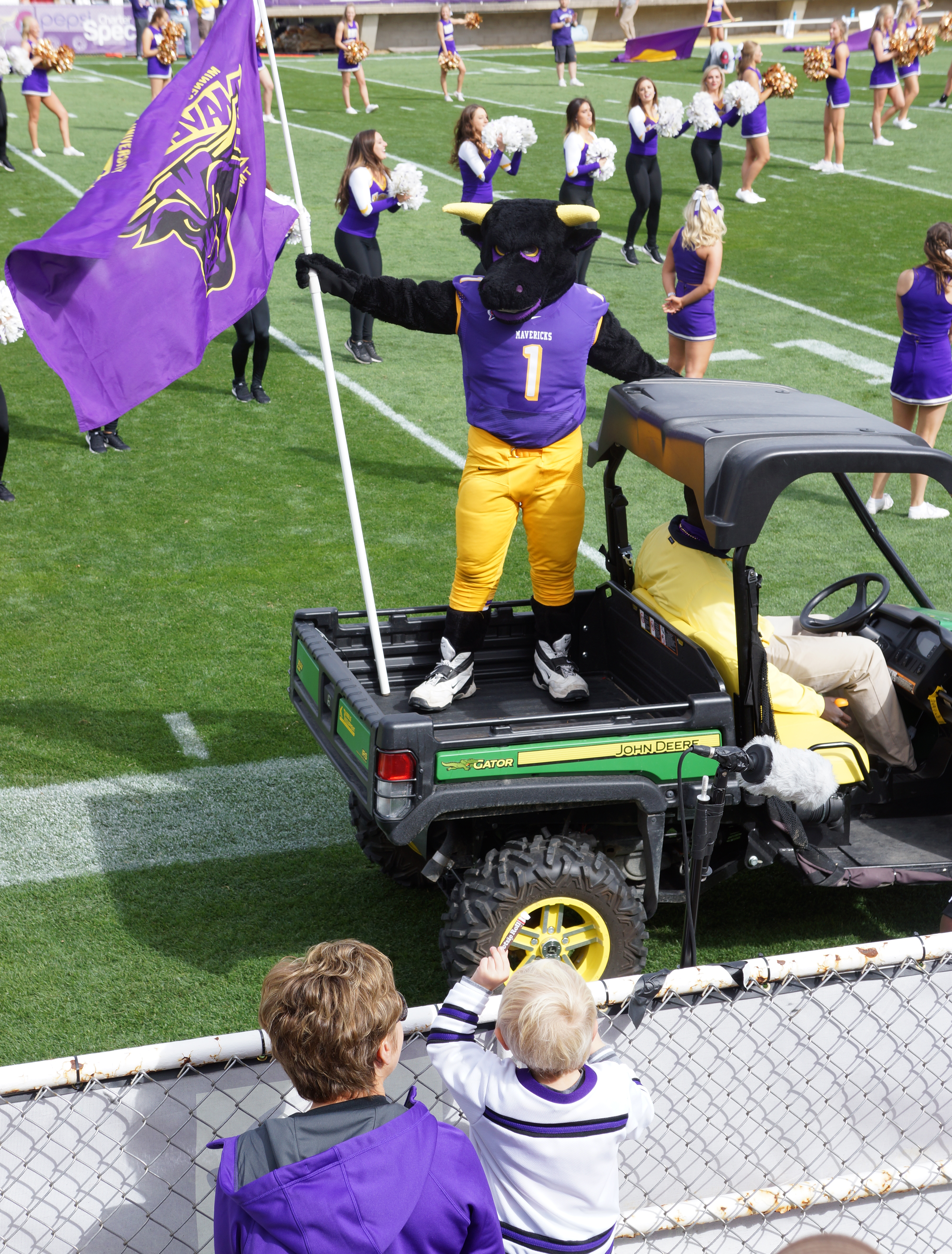
- Stomper the Maverick at Blakeslee Stadium
- University: Minnesota State University, Mankato
- Conference: Northern Sun Intercollegiate Conference; Central Collegiate Hockey Association; Western Collegiate Hockey Association
- Description: Maverick
- First seen: 1977

Stomper the Maverick is the mascot for the Minnesota State Mavericks athletics teams of the Minnesota State University, Mankato and the associated club teams and charities. During the year, Stomper makes over 250 appearances and nearly all home games for university teams as well as regional and charity fundraisers.

Stomper is known for helping rally the fans and crowds at sporting events through various antics. He can be seen as part of giveaways and other competitions and is often playfully waving to children. Several events, locations and areas are named for Stomper. For example, the university works in collaboration with Mankato Transit Service to run the Stomper Express, a transit service for students.

== History ==
The athletics teams of Minnesota State University, Mankato have changed over the years. Initially as a teacher preparatory college, there was no formal mascot until the 1920s when the nickname the "Peds" was used to refer to the pedagogues—an informal reference to teachers. In the 1950s, the mascot the "Indians" was adopted. This was dropped in 1976 due to Native American groups objecting to its portrayal of their culture. During 1977, there was a competition to come up with a new mascot. At the same time, Mankato State University was transitioning to a new athletic conference: the North Central Conference. The winner was Professor Roy Cook who suggested the "Maverick." The Maverick is a wild powerful steer, unbranded and unyielding.

The nickname "Stomper" was announced during Homecoming festivities in 1993 (officially unveiled Oct. 14, 1993). Libby "Albers" Furry (Class of 1997) was the inaugural mascot. Over the years, Stomper has had different designs, with the most recent logo redesign in 2004.
