= Minnesota State Mavericks =

Intercollegiate sports teams of Minnesota State University

- University: Minnesota State University, Mankato
- Nickname: Mavericks
- NCAA: Division II rest of sports Division I ice hockey
- Conference: Northern Sun Intercollegiate Conference
- Athletic director: Kevin Buisman
- Location: Mankato, Minnesota
- Varsity teams: 21
- Football stadium: Blakeslee Stadium (7,500)
- Basketball arena: Taylor Center (4,800)
- Ice hockey arena: Mayo Clinic Health System Event Center (5,280)
- Baseball stadium: MNSU Baseball Complex
- Colors: Purple and gold
- Mascot: Stomper
- Website: msumavericks.com
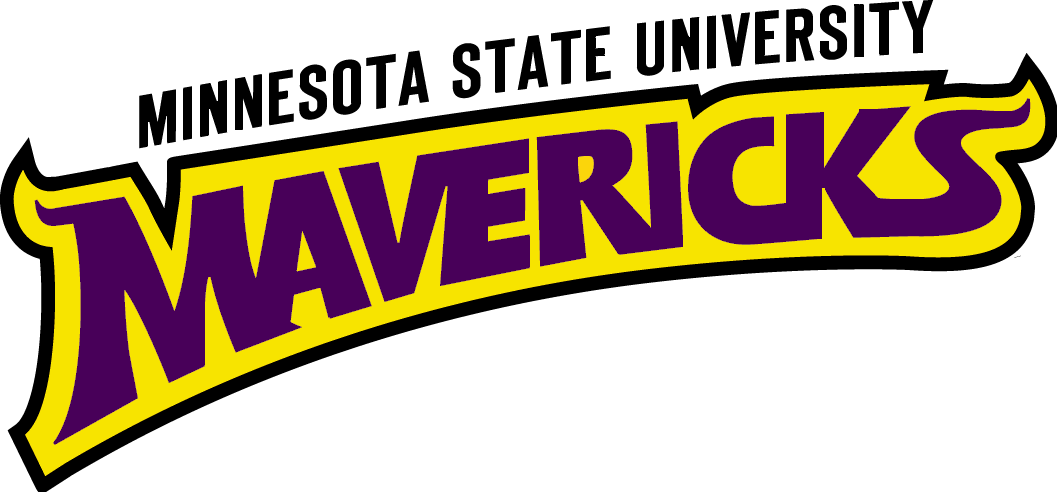

Team NCAA championships
- 8

The Minnesota State Mavericks are the intercollegiate athletic teams that represent Minnesota State University, Mankato. The school's athletic program includes 21 varsity sports teams. More than 600 students participate each year in athletics for the university. Most of the university's athletic teams compete at the NCAA Division II level in the Northern Sun Intercollegiate Conference (NSIC). The men's and women's ice hockey teams compete at the Division I level, respectively in the Central Collegiate Hockey Association (CCHA) and Western Collegiate Hockey Association (WCHA). Minnesota State began competition in the NSIC in 2008–09, due to the dissolution of the North Central Conference. It was also one of the seven WCHA men's hockey members that left that league after the 2020–21 season to reestablish the CCHA, a move that led to the demise of the men's side of the WCHA.

As of the 2023-24 athletic season, the university has won 10 team and 78 individual national championships. The combined teams have won the NSIC US Bank All-Sports Award 4 times. Since 1993, the Mavericks have been awarded the most National Championships out of all the colleges and universities in the Northern Sun Conference. The Mavericks also participate in the Division II Learfield Sports Directors’ Cup national competition.

== Sports ==
Men's sports	Women's sports
Basketball	Basketball
Cross country	Cross country
Golf	Golf
Ice hockey	Ice hockey
Baseball	Softball
Football	Soccer
Track & field^{1}	Track & field^{1}
Wrestling	Tennis
	Swimming & diving
	Volleyball
^{1} – includes both indoor and outdoor.

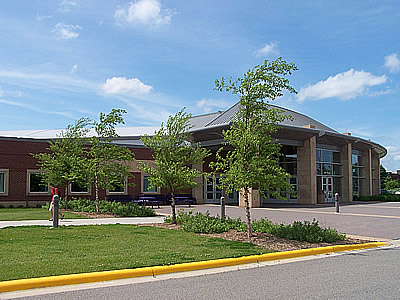
Opened in fall of 2000 – Made possible by donations of alumni, notably Glen Taylor, the 4,800-seat facility houses the Maverick basketball, volleyball and wrestling teams. The MNSU Admissions office is also located here and the 5,000 square-foot Hall of Champions showcases the university's proud history. In addition to MNSU athletic events and other sporting activities, Taylor Center also hosts MNSU commencement ceremonies, major concerts and lectures

The Minnesota State Mavericks athletics program fields 8 men's sports and 10 women's sports teams. The men's sports teams include baseball, basketball, cross country, football, golf, ice hockey, track and field and wrestling. The women's teams include basketball, cross country, golf, ice hockey, soccer, softball, swimming and diving, tennis, track and field, and volleyball. In addition, the athletics program includes the athletic marching band called the Maverick Machine, competitive dance and noncompetitive cheerleading.

=== Baseball ===
The men's baseball team has had considerable success in recent years, reaching the College World Series in 2010, 2012, 2013, and 2014. The baseball team has finished the 2011–2014 seasons with average winning percentages points at 0.750 or above. Top players who helped lead the Mavericks to a second-place at the Division II Baseball World Series in 2013 in included righthanded pitcher Jason Hoppe who set the NCAA single-season record with 55 1/3 consecutive scoreless innings streak and righthanded pitcher Harvey Martin who was named national pitcher of the year by Rawlings/ABCA, Daktronics and the NCBWA and was named First Team All-American by those three organizations. Martin went 9–1 and had a 2.06 earned run average as a senior. In 2013 they finished as runners-up to the University of Tampa. The team is currently coached by Matt Magers.

=== Football ===
The Minnesota State football team plays in NCAA Division II and is a member of the Northern Sun Intercollegiate Conference. Since 1962, they have played in Blakeslee Stadium, with a natural grass field and a capacity of 7,000.

The current head coach is Todd Hoffner, who has led Minnesota State to numerous NCAA playoff appearances and two appearance in the NCAA National Championship game in 2014 and 2019.

Minnesota State alumni who have gone on to the NFL include wide receiver Adam Thielen, offensive lineman Chris Reed, and tight end Bob Bruer.

=== Men's basketball ===
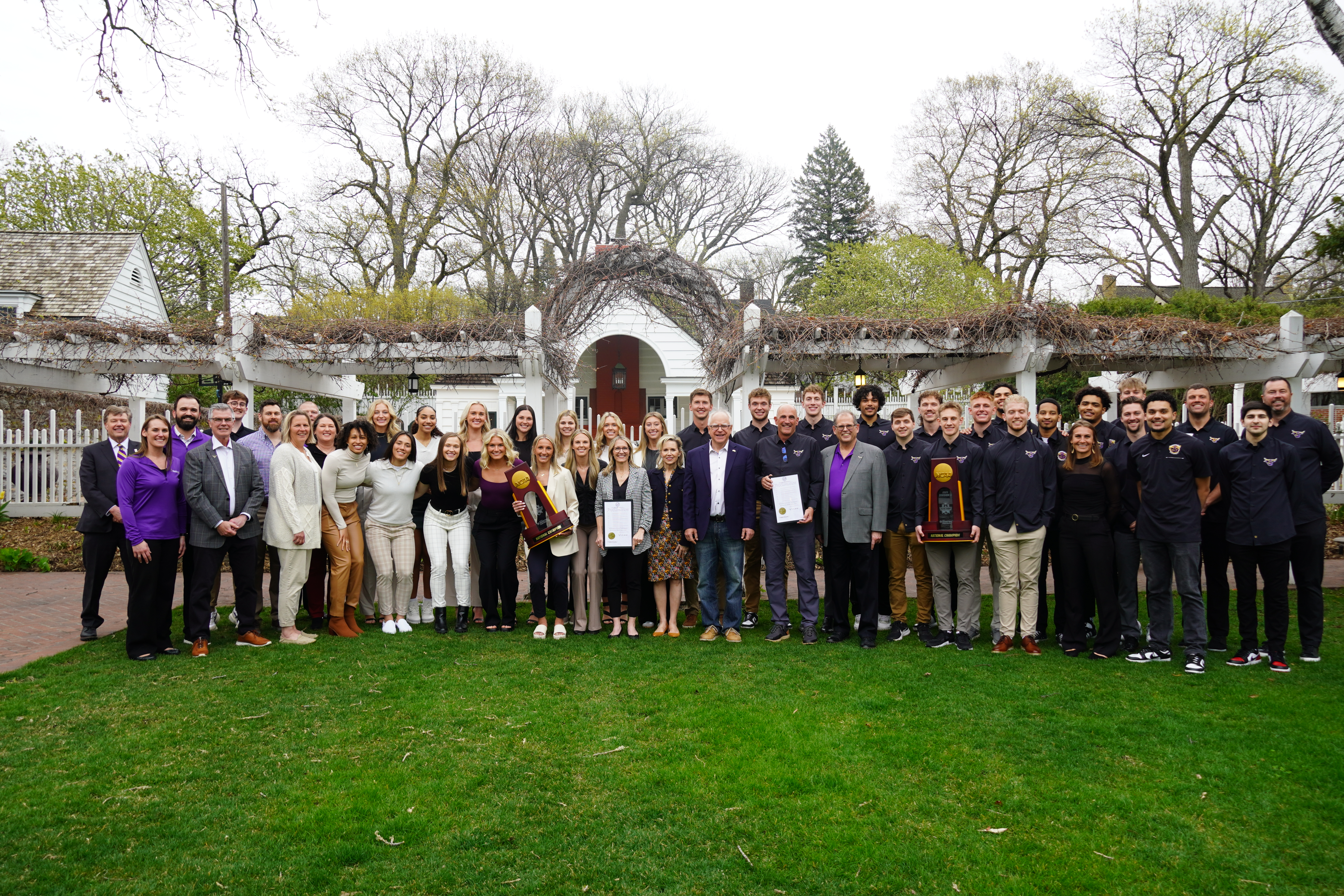
Championship men's and women's basketball teams meeting Gov. Tim Walz in 2024

The Mavericks notably lost in the finals of the 1947 NAIB tournament to Marshall University by a score of 73 to 59.

Minnesota State is currently coached by Matt Margenthaler, the school's all-time winningest men's basketball coach who is a 1991 Western Illinois graduate that has guided the Mavericks to a 330–133 mark for a .713 winning percentage, seven conference championships and 11 NCAA tournament appearances in his 15 years with program. In 2024, they won the NCAA Division II tournament a day after the women's team won their championship, making them the first school in four decades to win the men's and women's Division II championships in the same year.

=== Women's basketball ===
The women's basketball team won the 2009 NCAA Division II national championship with a 103–94 win over Franklin Pierce University on March 27, 2009, in San Antonio, Texas. The combined score of the game (197 points) established a championship tournament record for most points in a game by two teams. In 2024, the Mavericks won their second national championship by defeating Texas Woman's University by a score of 89-73.

=== Men's ice hockey ===
Minnesota State notably competes at the Division I level in both men's and women's hockey. The team plays and practices at the Mayo Clinic Health System Events Center.

Prior to 1996, the program competed in the NCAA Division II, during which time they won the 1980 NCAA Division II National Championship by defeating Elmira College 5–2 in the final. The Mavericks earned their first berth in the NCAA Division I Tournament in 2002–03. They lost to eventual East Regional champion Cornell University 5–2 in the opening round. In recent years, they have seen increased success, including two Frozen Four appearances. They were the national runner-up in 2022, losing the championship game to Denver, 1-5.

The hockey program is currently led by head coach Luke Strand, who replaced Mike Hastings in 2023. Before Hastings, the team was led by Troy Jutting, and long-time coach Don Brose. The Mavericks commenced play at the Division I level during the 1996–97 season.

Mavericks alumni who have played in the NHL include Ryan Carter (Anaheim/Carolina/Minnesota), Steve Wagner (St. Louis/Pittsburgh), David Backes (St. Louis), Tim Jackman (Columbus/Phoenix/Los Angeles/New York Islanders/Calgary), Grant Stevenson (San Jose) and Jon Kalinski (Philadelphia). Carter became the first former Maverick to have his name engraved into the Stanley Cup, as a member of the 2007 Stanley Cup-winning Anaheim Ducks.

David Backes became the first former Maverick to be selected to the U.S. Olympic Team for men's hockey and won a silver medal during the 2010 Winter Olympics.

=== Women's ice hockey ===
Minnesota State's women's hockey team commenced play in 1998. Their current head coach is John Harrington. Prior to Harrington, they had several other head coaches including Eric Means and Jeff Vizenor.

=== Softball ===
Minnesota State's softball team was led by longtime head coach Lori Meyer, who coached the Mavericks from 1985 to 2025. Under Meyer, Minnesota State has won one NCAA Division II softball tournament national championship (2017), three North Central Conference titles (1987, 1989, 2007) and five Northern Sun Intercollegiate Conference titles (2012, 2013, 2014, 2016, 2017), made 18 trips to the NCAA Division II National Tournament (1987, 1989, 1995, 1997, 2007, 2008, 2009, 2010, 2011, 2012, 2013, 2014, 2016, 2017, 2018, 2021, 2022, 2025) and three trips to the NCAA Championships (1987, 2011 and 2017). Minnesota State appeared in one Women's College World Series in 1975. She finished her career with 1,444 career wins, becoming the winningest softball coach in NCAA Division II history.

=== Track and field ===
Junior pole vaulter Katelin Rains claimed her second NCAA Division II indoor pole vault championship and was named the USTFCCCA National Field Athlete of the Year. She hails from the same high school as former Maverick and U.S. Olympian David Backes, both attended Spring Lake Park High School in Spring Lake Park, Minnesota.

In 2010, senior Denise Mokaya won the Division II Indoor NCAA National Championship in the 800m, winning in 1:51.41

== National championships ==
The Mavericks have won ten team national championships, eight at the NCAA College Division/Division II level and two at the NAIA level before the Mavericks joined the NCAA following the creation of the College Division. The Mavericks have also finished as runner-up on several occasions, including football in 2014 and 2019, baseball in 2013, and men's ice hockey in 2022.

=== Team ===
Sport	Association	Division	Year	Opponent/Runner-up	Score
Men's basketball (1)	NCAA	Division II	2024	Nova Southeastern	88–85
Men's cross country (1)	NCAA	Division II	1988	South Dakota State	77–98 (–21)
Men's ice hockey (1)	NCAA	Division II	1980	Elmira	5–2
Softball (1)	NCAA	Division II	2017	Angelo State	2–0
Women's basketball (2)	NCAA	Division II	2009	Franklin Pierce	103–94
Women's basketball (2)	NCAA	Division II	2024	Texas Woman's	89–73
Women's indoor track (1)	NCAA	Division II	2022	Grand Valley State	58–51
Wrestling (3)	NAIA	N/A	1958	Iowa State Teachers	97–69 (+28)
Wrestling (3)	NAIA	N/A	1959	Southern Illinois	64–52 (+12)
Wrestling (3)	NCAA	College Division	1965	Cal State Poly	57–54 (+3)

== Minnesota Vikings ==
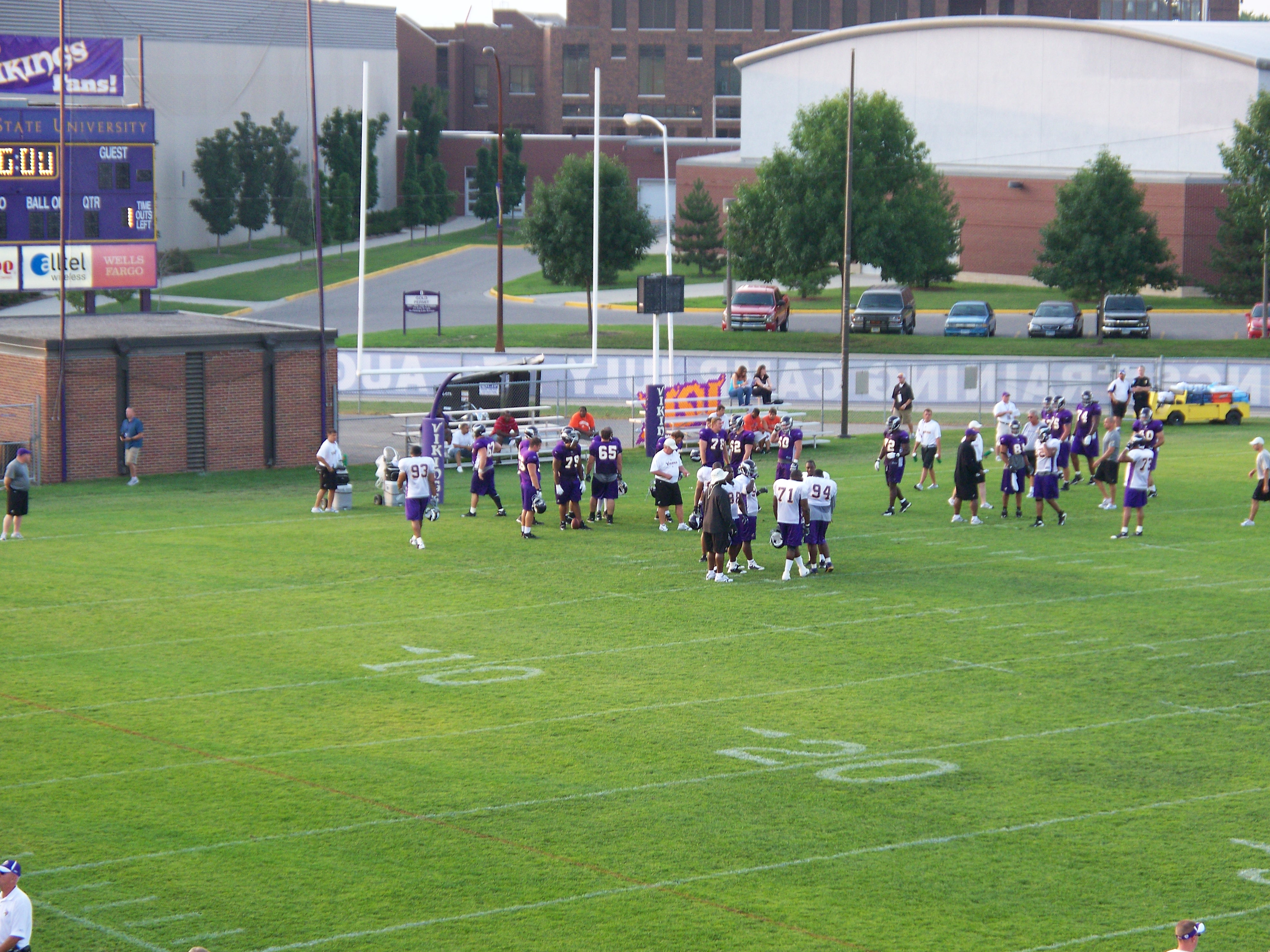
2008 Minnesota Vikings training camp at Blakeslee Stadium.

Minnesota State University hosted the summer training camp for the Minnesota Vikings from 1966 to 2017, before the team moved camp to the Minneapolis suburb of Eagan, Minnesota.

== See also ==
- List of college athletic programs in Minnesota
