= Julia Sears =

Academic and suffragist

Julia A. Sears
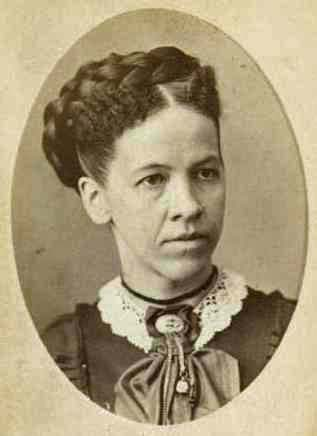
- Julia Ann Sears, c. 1872
- Born: March 19, 1839; East Dennis, Massachusetts, US
- Died: 1929 (aged 88–89); East Dennis, Massachusetts, US
- Education: Bridgewater Normal School
- Occupation: Educator
- Employer(s): Minnesota State University, Mankato and Peabody College

Julia Ann Sears (March 19, 1839 – 1929 or 1930) was a pioneering academic and suffragist, achieving a milestone early in her career as she became the first woman to head a public college in the United States, in 1872. The school was Mankato Normal School, now Minnesota State University, Mankato, which named a residence hall after Sears in 2008. Sears was an active suffragist in Tennessee.

== Family and early life ==
The Sears family lineage begins with Richard Sares, who arrived in Yarmouth, Massachusetts in around 1630. The Sears family also includes Edmond Sears, who composed the poem and later Christmas carol "It Came Upon the Midnight Clear" in 1849. Most of the notable members of the Sears family had an educational or religious backgrounds. Constant, Sears' father, was a sea captain who retired to become a cranberry farmer and salt manufacturer. Overall, the Sears' Family consists primarily of sea captains, religious figures in the Methodist and Baptist faiths, as well as educators.

Julia Ann Sears was born to Constant and Deborah Chipman Sears on March 19, 1839, in East Dennis, Cape Cod, Massachusetts. Julia was the second youngest of six siblings: Thankful Snow, Emily, Sarah R., Betsey Thomas, and Amanda. Her mother had another daughter, who died in 1832. Julia had no uncles or brothers. As children, Julia and her sisters underwent religious training by Methodist ministers, at month-long summer camps. In her later years, Sears recalled pretending to be a teacher when playing with friends.

== Education ==
Sears attended a common school in East Dennis, from age five to age fifteen. She then most likely attended the East Dennis Academy from 1854 to 1858. During this time, Julia decided she wanted to be an educator. Sears moved away from home and attended Bridgewater Normal School from 1858 to 1860. Students were asked to affirm their devotion to becoming a teacher or they would be charged $10 for every term they attended the school. During her time at Bridgewater Normal School, Sears worked closely with the principal, Marshall Conant. Conant had a passion for mathematics, astronomy and mechanics, and possibly influenced Sears' later career choice of becoming a mathematics professor. At the end of her education, Julia Sears received a General Diploma of the Institution, similar to a modern-day GED.

== Teaching ==
Between 1860 and 1866 Julia Sears taught at a normal school in Cape Cod. In 1866, Sears was a teacher in Western State Normal School, later to be named Farmington State Normal School. The principal of Western State Normal School was George M. Gage, but in 1868 he moved to Mankato, Minnesota. Julia Sears had known George Gage, as a schoolmate, at Bridgewater Normal School. After Gage's departure, Sears went to teach at Prescott School for Boys and Girls in Charlestown, Boston. From 1869 to 1871, Sears was the Head Assistant in Boston. In the summer of 1870, George Gage offered Sears the position of Head Assistant at Mankato Normal School, but Sears refused this offer. During this time, Sears studied at the Massachusetts Institute of Technology.

== Mankato Normal School ==
Julia Sears started teaching at the Mankato Normal School, now known as Minnesota State University, in 1871. After only one year, Sears made history by becoming the principal in 1872. At this point in history, this kind of achievement was not well documented or communicated well. For the next 50–80 years, there are documents of other women believed to be the first female presidents of a U.S. public college. She has been identified as the first woman to serve as a normal school principal in America, although it's possible Mary Cragin predated her.

Sears' first address to the school's female graduates was forthright, stating:

You are stepping out into life at a time when you hear not the sound, 'thus far in education may you go and no farther, this place you may fill, but not that'; but, instead, universities and colleges open wide their doors and bid you enter, and any place you are fitted to fill is no longer denied you.

However, such frankness was still controversial, and she was forced to leave the university after only a year. She retained considerable support among the students and the Mankato community. This support shifted into a protest, becoming so heated that it resulted in expulsions and was known as the "Sears Rebellion." 32 students were expelled as a result of walk outs in support of Sears, and local businessmen and professionals asked the school to reinstate Sears as Assistant Principal.

== Peabody Normal School ==
Sears then took a post as professor of and head of the mathematics department at Peabody Normal School (now Peabody College of Vanderbilt University) in Nashville, Tennessee. In Nashville, she worked tirelessly as an advocate of women's rights and in particular the right to vote. She remained at Peabody until her retirement in 1907, and a portrait of her, painted in 1904, hangs today in the university.

== Retirement and death ==
She retired to Fairhaven, Massachusetts. At her death in 1929, the Peabody campus newspaper said, "Her precision, her accuracy, her fairness, her brilliant demonstrations, and, above all, her ability to inspire the ambition of all those she taught became famous incidents of her instruction at Peabody." This quote was inscribed on the wall of a newly constructed residence hall that was named in her honor at Minnesota State University, Mankato in 2015, and is a reminder of her impact on the community.
