= Minnesota State University, Mankato =

Public university in Mankato, Minnesota, US

- Former names: Mankato Normal School (1868–1921); Mankato State Teachers College (1921–1957); Mankato State College (1957–1975); Mankato State University (1975–1998)
- Motto: Big Ideas. Real-world Thinking.
- Type: Public university
- Established: 1868; 158 years ago
- Parent institution: Minnesota State system
- Accreditation: HLC
- Endowment: $119 million (2025)
- President: Edward Inch
- Provost: David Hood
- Faculty: 700
- Total staff: 1,600
- Students: 15,721 (fall 2025)
- Location: Mankato, Minnesota, United States; 44.147°N 93.998°W
- Campus: Mid-size city 303 acres (123 ha)
- Newspaper: The Reporter
- Colors: Purple; Gold
- Nickname: Mavericks
- Sporting affiliations: NCAA Division II – NSIC; NCAA Division I - CCHA, WCHA
- Mascot: Stomper
- Website: mnsu.edu
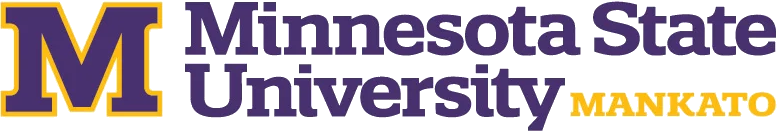

Minnesota State University, Mankato (MNSU, MSU, or Minnesota State) is a public university in Mankato, Minnesota, United States. It is Minnesota's second-largest university, and has over 145,000 living alumni worldwide. Founded in 1868, it is the second-oldest member of the Minnesota State Colleges and Universities system and is commonly referred to as the flagship institution. It was established as the "Second State Normal School" in 1858 and officially opened as "Mankato Normal School" a decade later.

Across seven colleges and schools, Minnesota State offers over 130 undergraduate programs of study, over 80 master's programs, and 4 doctoral programs. MNSU has two satellite campuses: one in the Twin Cities suburb Edina and one in Owatonna. Through the College of Extended Learning, it provides bachelor's degrees online and at the Normandale Partnership Center in Bloomington. In 2023, MNSU partnered with Saint Paul College to launch the Minnesota Polytechnic and Applied Learning Institute (MinnPoly), becoming Minnesota's first polytechnic institute.

The Minnesota State Mavericks compete in 21 intercollegiate sports, most at the NCAA Division II level in the Northern Sun Intercollegiate Conference. Its men's and women's ice hockey teams compete at the Division I level, respectively in the Central Collegiate Hockey Association (CCHA) and Western Collegiate Hockey Association (WCHA).

== History ==
=== 1860–1921: Founding and early years ===
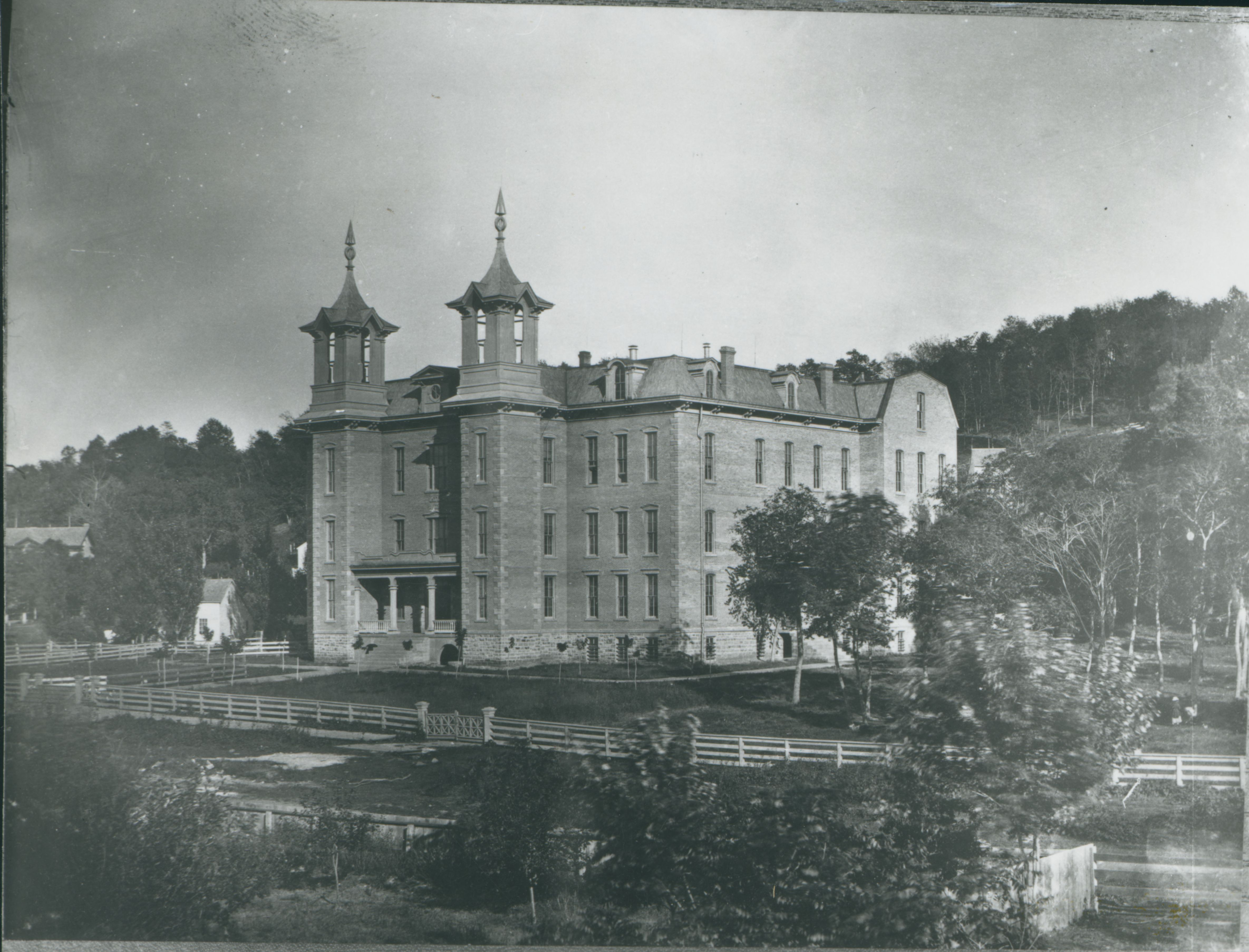
Old Main at Mankato Normal School, Mankato, Minnesota

The state legislature recognized the need for an education center in southern Minnesota in 1858. In 1860, the legislature chartered the development of state-run normal schools across the state. The largest and fastest-growing cities outside of Saint Paul, Saint Cloud and Mankato, were selected for the sites, dependent on local fundraising to establish the schools with seed money. Through the efforts of local attorney and state legislator Daniel Buck, the newly formed City of Mankato donated $5,000 raised from the community and sold $5,000 in bonds to found the second state normal school, Mankato Normal School. It was chartered in state law in 1860 and held its first classes in 1868, with an enrollment of 27. The school's original mission was to train and educate teachers for rural schools in southern Minnesota. Early coursework included mathematics, science, civil engineering, agriculture, western classics, and basic pedagogy. The first Normal School-owned building's cornerstone was laid on June 22, 1869. George M. Gage served as Mankato Normal School's principal from 1868 to 1872.

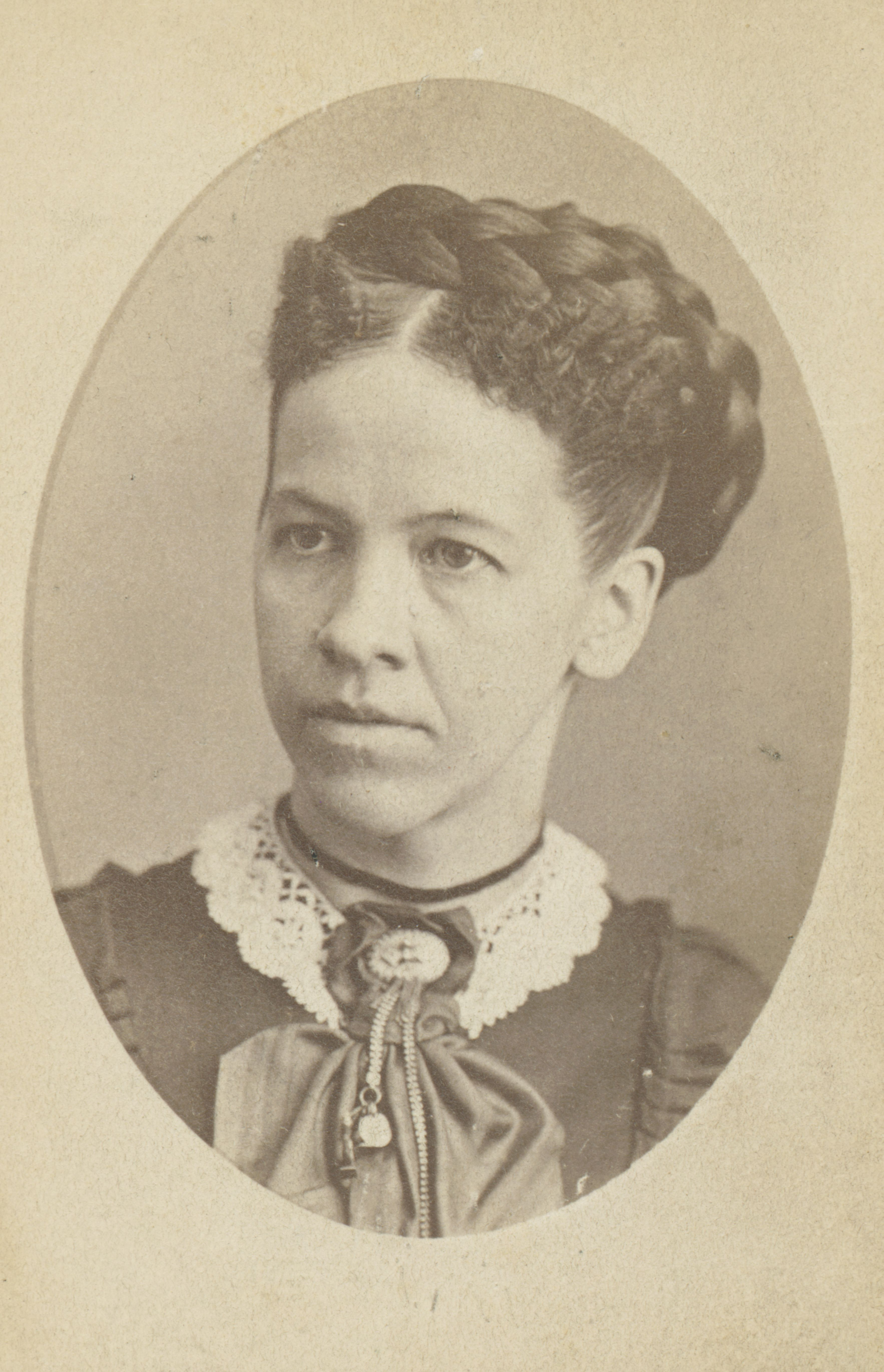
Portrait of Julia Sears

During this period, Mankato Normal School provided educational certificates that allowed graduates to become schoolteachers, and most of the students were women. In relation to this focus on women's education, Mankato Normal School is noted as the first public college in the U.S. to be headed by a woman, suffragette Julia Sears, in 1872. In 1873, the State Normal Board demoted Sears to assistant principal, replacing her as principal with David C. John. Sears's salary as assistant principal was reduced from $1,500 to $1,200 and resulted in a letter to Gage that it was doubtful that she would see him again in Minnesota. In response, the assistant principal position was offered to Cornelius Hyde. Both Sears and Hyde arrived for work on September 1, 1873.

After it was determined that Hyde would receive the position, 41 students refused to attend classes and 32 were expelled for failing to return after three days. 60 residents signed a petition requesting that Hyde return to his position as instructor and that Sears be reinstated as assistant principal. This became known as the "Sears Rebellion", which lasted until Sears left the school for a professorship at Peabody Normal School. These events were commemorated when a new residence hall was dedicated in honor of Sears in 2008 and a commission on the status of women was founded to support the advancement of women's education at the institution in the 1990s.

=== 1921–1957: Teaching college, post-WWII expansion ===
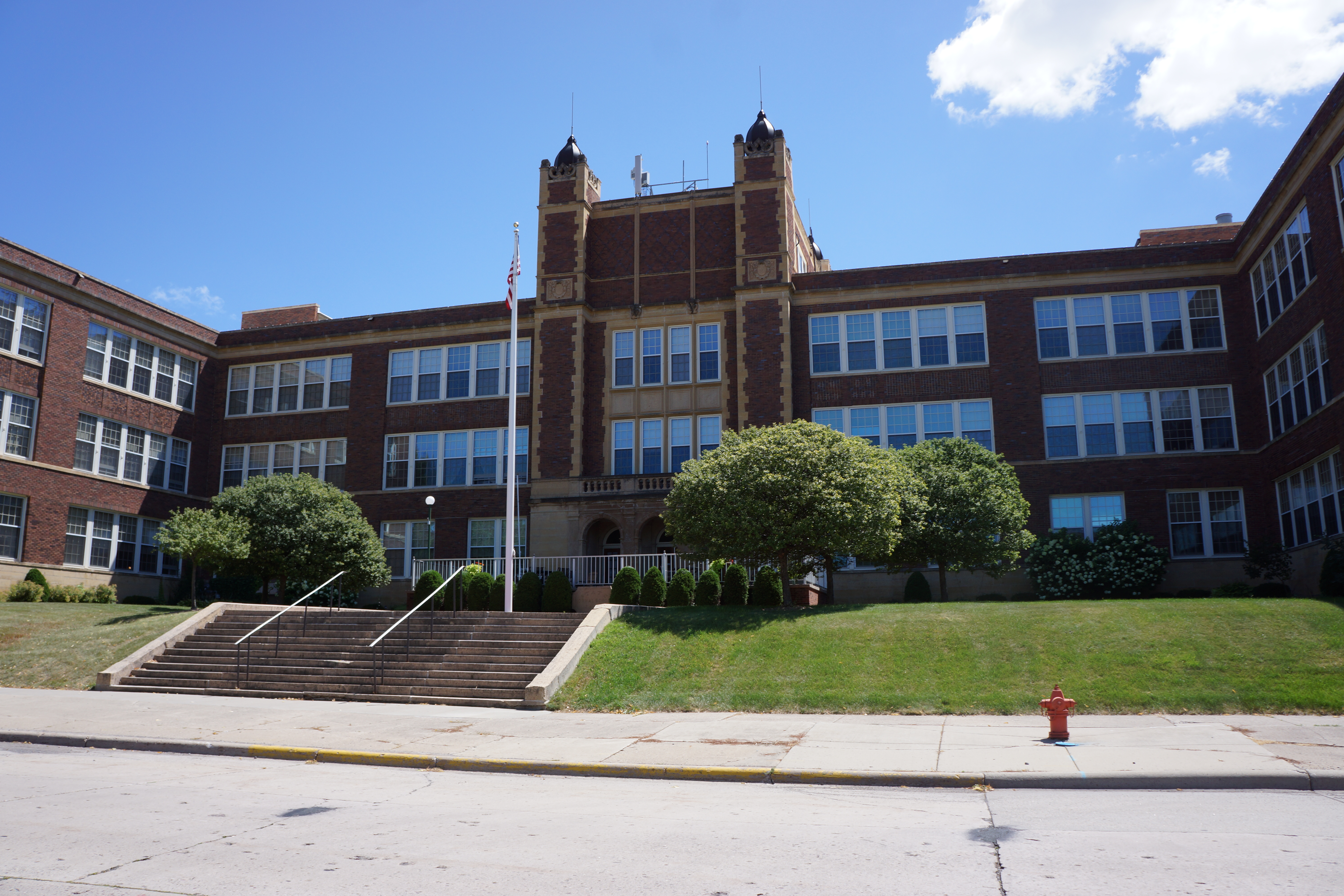
Old Main of the historic lower campus. Built in 1924, it now hosts a senior living community

By 1921, the school had grown to the point that it began to offer four-year bachelor's degrees. As a result, it was renamed "Mankato State Teachers College". The original Old Main building was destroyed in a fire in 1922 and a new building was completed on April 4, 1924. Enrollment dipped during World War II and the college refocused its extension programs on providing education to members of the Works Progress Administration and Naval Corps.

Clarence L. Crawford became college president in 1946. He held the position for 20 years, overseeing and promoting tremendous growth of the college from approximately 400 students at the time of his arrival to about 14,000 when he retired in 1966. During the postwar period, student enrollment expanded greatly. The original university buildings were then in what was known as the Valley Campus, down the hill in lower Mankato. The Valley Campus's size and footprint lacked the space needed to handle the growing student body. The Mankato Teachers College received 12 former Army barracks as a short-term solution. By the late 1950s work began on an entirely new, modern campus atop the river valley bluff. This became the Highland Campus. An experimental school, the Wilson School, was built on the Highland Campus to research and apply new teaching methods for students in grades K–12. The intention was to provide student teachers the opportunity to learn and experiment with new methods in a university environment.

=== 1957–1995: Transition to comprehensive university ===
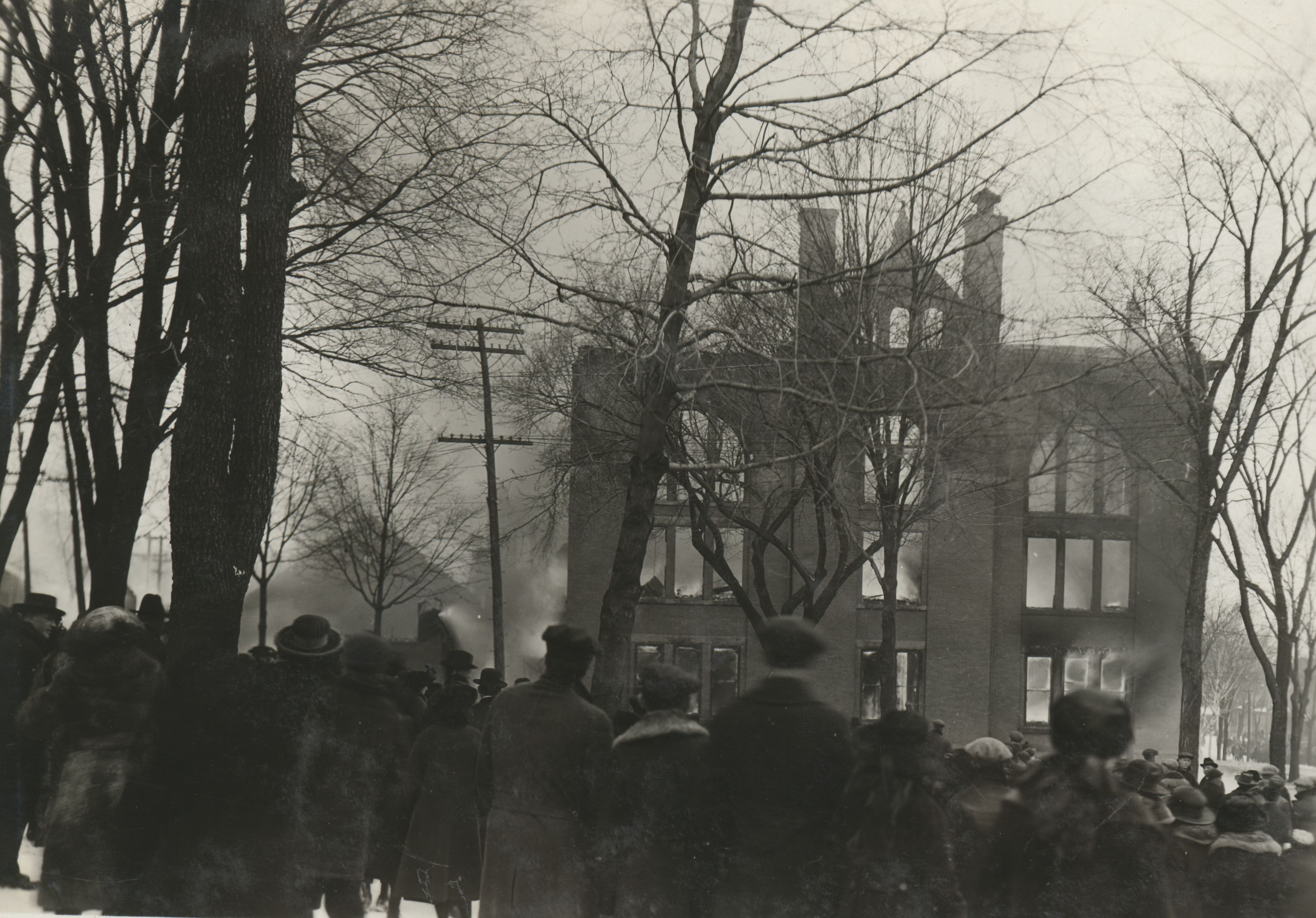
Old Main on fire at Mankato State Teachers College, Mankato, Minnesota

By 1957, the institution's mission had broadened to comprehensive four-year college education, and the legislature changed the school's name to Mankato State College. By the 1960s the institution had grown so rapidly that a bill was proposed in the state legislature to elevate it to university status. Originally, Mankato State was to have been renamed the University of Southern Minnesota; a later amendment would have renamed it Minnesota State University. (These were proposed long before the television show Coach aired.) It was to be a second and independent state university equal in stature to the University of Minnesota at a time when there was only one research institution. There was significant opposition from the University of Minnesota and from Governor Karl Rolvaag at the time.

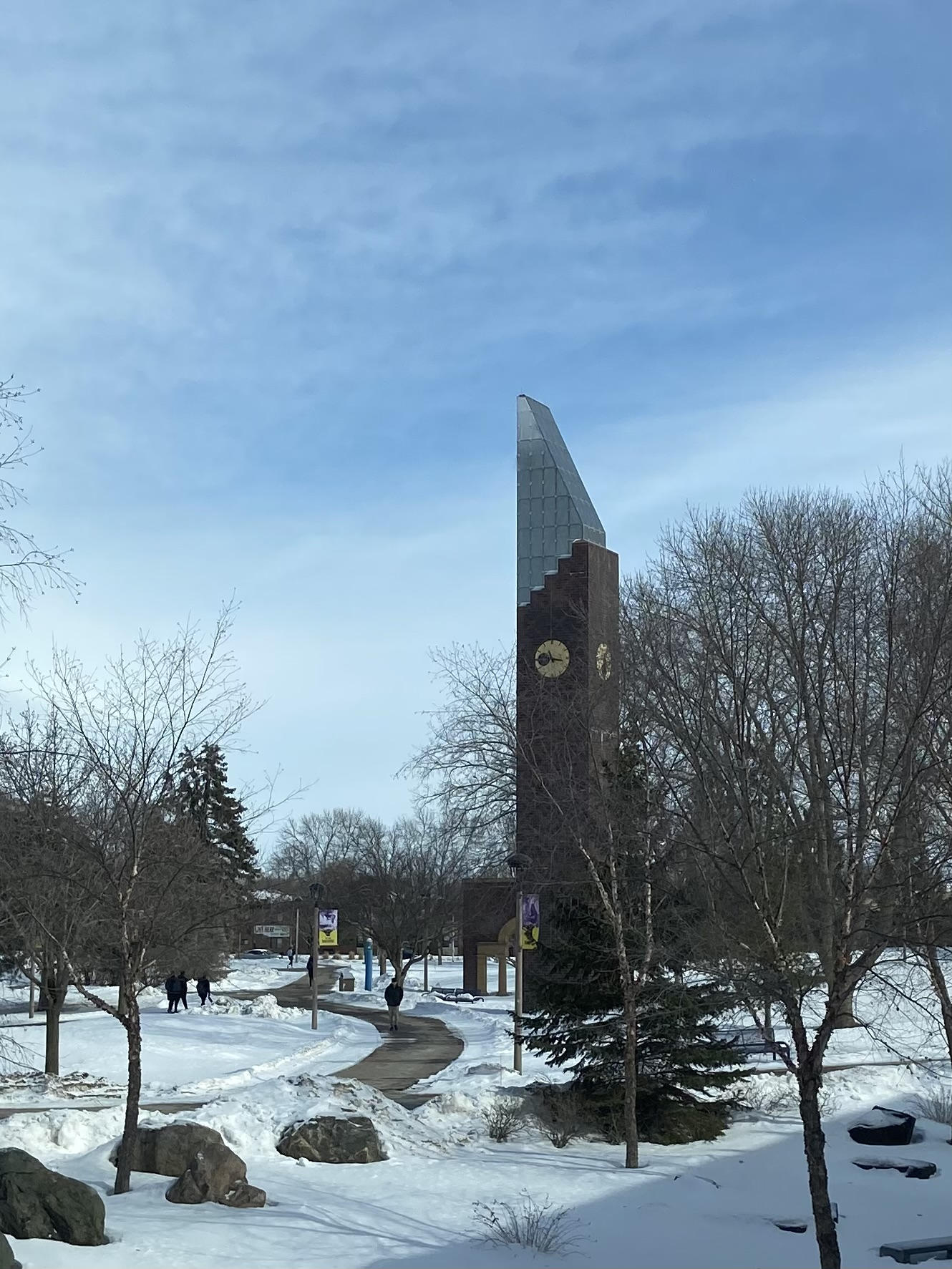
The Ostrander-Student Memorial Bell Tower stands in the campus arboretum. It was completed in 1989

In 1975 the college successfully made the case for university status and was renamed "Mankato State University". This change reflected a further 40% growth in the student body to 12,000 students by 1972. Following this, the number of programs increased, to include science, technology, engineering, health sciences, and others. While the transition to "state university" was being considered, the administration also explored the prospect of combining the Valley Campus buildings with the Highland Campus on the recommendation of a consultant hired by the Higher Education Coordinating Commission. Despite some faculty opposition to the merger, Mankato State University received permission to consolidate in May 1977 and completed the consolidation under President Margaret Preska on May 5, 1980. The Valley Campus was eventually sold to a private developer and the Highland Campus grew.

=== 1995–present: Minnesota State system, doctoral offerings ===
In 1995, the seven state universities were transferred to the newly created Minnesota State Colleges and Universities system by a mandate from the state legislature. The university was renamed Minnesota State University, Mankato in 1998 in recognition of its significant contribution to the state's higher education system. This name change was also intended to broaden recognition of the university in the Midwest. Richard Rush, then the president of the university, said of the name change, "Our goal is to make this university the other great public university in Minnesota." This marked a significant change in direction in the institution's history, one that would later be realized as it fought to be authorized to award doctoral degrees. It was during this time that the institution began to call itself Minnesota State.

In 2007, in another major milestone, the university was authorized to begin offering applied doctoral degrees.

== Academics ==
Academic rankings

Master's
- Washington Monthly: 250

Regional
- U.S. News & World Report: 75

National
- Forbes: 344

MNSU offers over 130 undergraduate programs of study, 13 pre-professional programs, and over 85 graduate programs. It provides a comprehensive education: each undergraduate program of study includes general requirements in mathematics, writing, cultural diversity, speech, information technology, and the environment. Minnesota State is among the nation's top-producing master's institutions of Fulbright recipients, producing 11 student grant awards and 41 Fulbright Scholars.

Each year, over 3,000 students graduate from MNSU. The Office of the Registrar confers around 3,000 bachelor's, 600 master's, 50 specialist, and 10 doctoral degrees. MNSU's Career Development Center reports that 85% of graduates find employment in an area related to their field, and 90% were employed or continuing their education within 12 months of graduation.

=== Organization and administration ===
The university is organized into seven discipline-specific colleges. Academic programs, schools, and extended learning are divided among them:

- College of Allied Health and Nursing
- College of Business
- College of Education
- College of Humanities & Social Sciences
- College of Science, Engineering and Technology
- College of Graduate Studies and Research
- College of Extended Learning

=== Institutes and centers ===
Fourteen university-wide interdisciplinary centers and institutes work across collegiate lines:

- The Glen Taylor Nursing Institute
- The Center on Aging
- The Minnesota Center for Transportation Research and Implementation
- The Center for Excellence in Scholarship and Research
- The Minnesota Center for Modeling and Simulation
- The Kessel Institute for Peace and Change
- The Minnesota State Engineering Center of Excellence
- The Minnesota Center for Rural Policy and Development
- Minnesota Polytechnic and Applied Learning Institute (MinnPoly)
- The School of Applied Agriculture, Food and Natural Resources
- Small Business Development Center
- Southern Minnesota Historical Center
- The Urban and Regional Studies Institute
- The Water Resources Center

=== Notable programs ===
MNSU has a history of creating new programs to meet the demand of new and developing fields. It was the nation's first institution to offer a Master of Fine Arts degree in forensics. It also offered one of the first interdisciplinary programs in urban studies and local government management.

The Aviation and Airport Management program is Minnesota's only accredited aviation program. Graduates are often hired to work in nearby states as the program also serves regional needs. The university has developed national partnerships with Delta Air Lines and Sun Country Airlines that provide on-the-job training and direct hire before graduation.

=== Undergraduate student profile ===
Minnesota State's undergraduate student body includes a large proportion of residential full-time students. It attracts the second-largest number of incoming Minnesota freshmen each year. For 2013–2016, the institution had rolling admissions with an acceptance rate of 65.5%, and the average accepted student ACT score ranged from 20 to 25.

Since the fall of 2012, the university has been the largest university in the Minnesota State system, and the second-largest in Minnesota, according to the total number of full-year equivalent students, with enrollment regularly over 15,000 students.

== Campus ==
=== Main campus ===
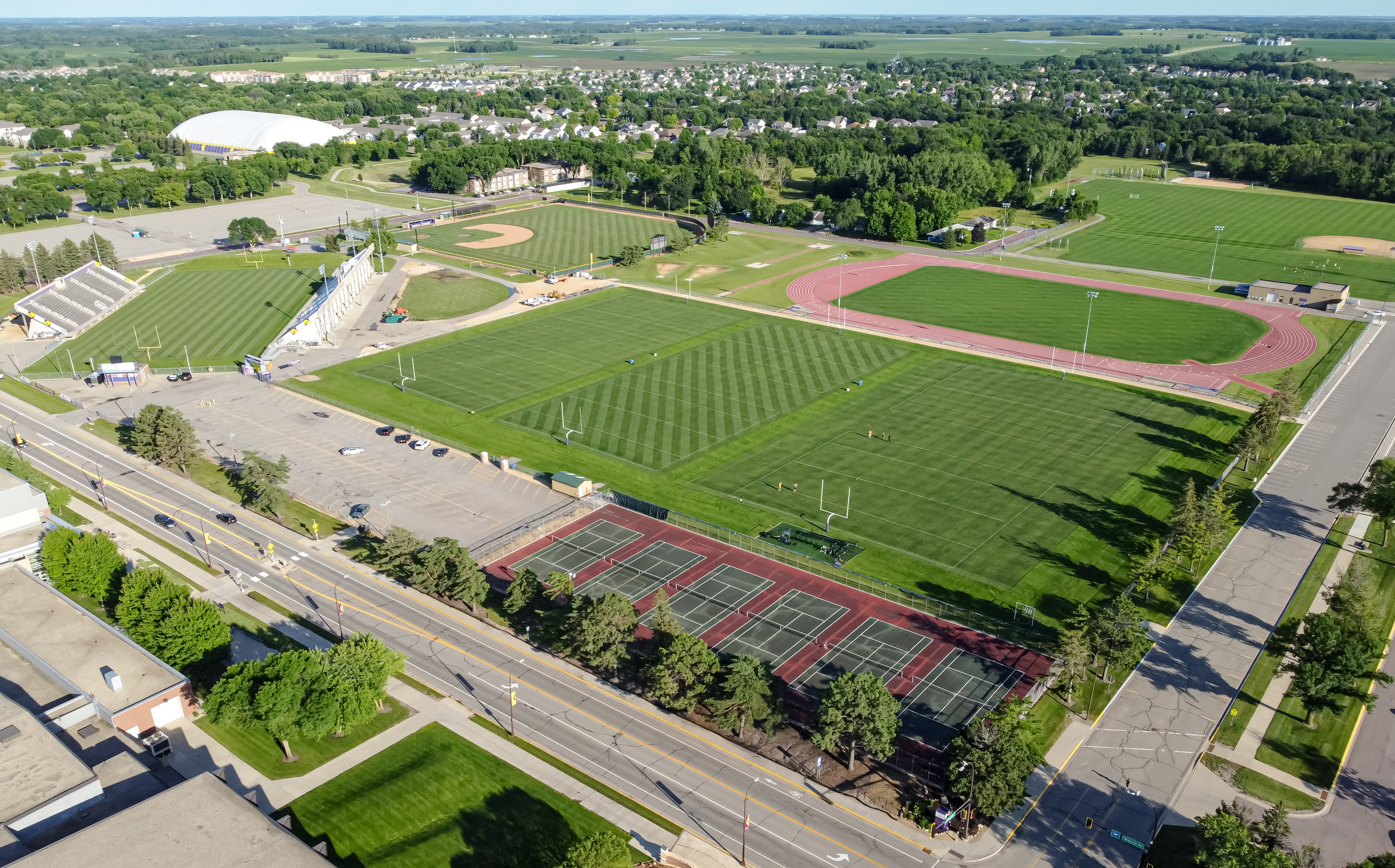
Athletic fields

Minnesota State's main campus contains 30 buildings spread over 303 acres. The campus includes housing, academic buildings, a main library, a music library, two astronomy observatories, experimental research stations for alternative and renewable energy, a recreation center, an athletics complex, a student center, an administration center, and over 50 acres of athletics fields, including Blakeslee Stadium. The Minnesota State Mavericks men's and women's hockey teams also use and have administrative space at the Mayo Clinic Health System Event Center and the All Seasons Arena off campus.

==== Student housing ====
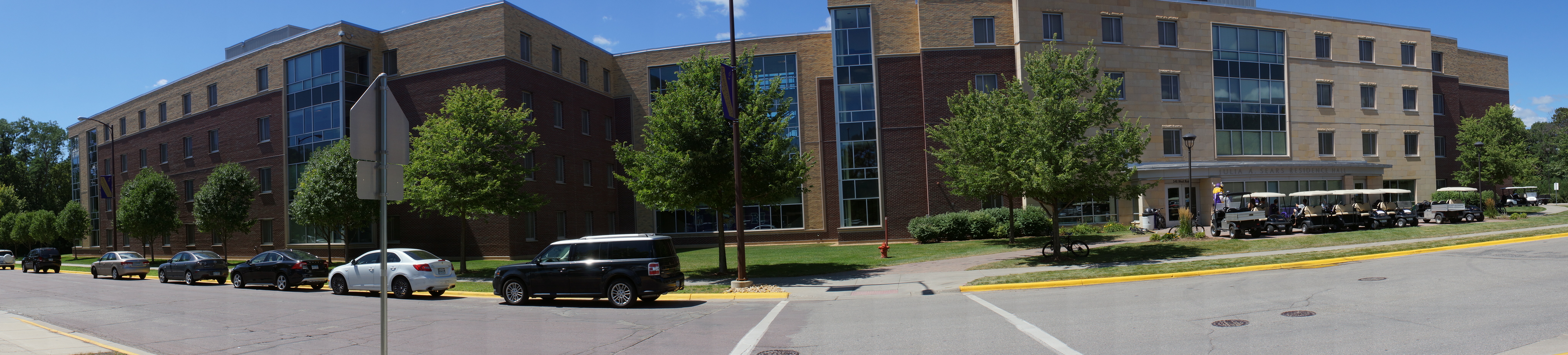
Julia Sears Residence Hall

Minnesota State has five residence communities, housing up to 2,900 students: McElroy Hall, Crawford Hall, Preska Hall, Julia Sears Hall, and apartment-style Stadium Heights. On-campus housing is optional. There are over a dozen Learning Community programs that range from academic to hobby-based interests.

=== Satellite campuses ===
==== Edina ====
This campus is at 7700 France Ave. S. in Edina, and serves a diverse student body from the southwest Twin Cities metropolitan area. Programs at this campus include 12 undergraduate programs, including bachelor's degrees, bachelor's completion programs, undergraduate minors, and teaching licensure. The College of Graduate Studies offers 23 graduate programs, including master's degrees in accounting, engineering, education leadership, and other specialty areas.

==== Owatonna ====
The state established Owatonna College and University Center on 27 acres on Owatonna's southwest side to meet the needs of college graduates in the Owatonna area. This site is a collaboration of Minnesota State University, Mankato, South Central College, and Riverland Community College to provide lower-division liberal arts, career, and technical education, and upper-division and graduate-level studies in one location. On average 4,000 students do for-credit coursework at this location.

==== Normandale partnership center ====
In 2012, a partnership center was established to offer several targeted bachelor's degree in the southwest Twin Cities area at Normandale Community College in Bloomington. Several trial programs originally offered at the Normandale Center, such as the Twin Cities engineering program, were expanded to other Minnesota State system community colleges in 2016.

== Student life ==
Undergraduate demographics as of Fall 2023
Race and ethnicity	Total
White	72%
International student	9%
Black	6%
Hispanic	6%
Asian	3%
Two or more races	3%
Unknown	1%
Economic diversity
Low-income (Note: The percentage of students who received an income-based federal Pell grant intended for low-income students.)	24%
Affluent (Note: The percentage of students who are a part of the American middle class at the bare minimum.)	76%

Mankato is widely considered a college town, with 32.1% of the population between the ages of 15 and 24. In 2017, Schools.com ranked Mankato the nation's second-best college town.

=== Student organizations ===
Students can join over 200 academic student groups, intramural sports, leadership and religious organizations, honorary and professional fraternities and sororities, and special interest groups. There is an active Panhellenic Council and Intrafraternity Council.

=== Media ===
==== Print ====
First published on March 23, 1926, The Reporter is the university's student-run newspaper. It covers Minnesota State athletics and campus happenings and publishes editorials and thought pieces. Weekly editions come out during the fall and spring academic terms. Its office is in the Centennial Student Union.

Upon its founding, the newspaper went by the name Among Ourselves and was funded by annual 50-cent subscription fees. The last issue of Among Ourselves was on April 2, 1927. The paper returned as School Spirit on March 7, 1929, and was renamed College Spirit on May 25, 1933. The last issue of College Spirit was on June 4, 1935. In fall 1936, the paper took the name The College Reporter, arguing that the name "spirit" better suited a boat than a newspaper.

==== Radio ====
89.7FM KMSU is MNSU's official radio station. It was founded in 1963.

=== Centennial Student Union ===
Opened on October 27, 1967, the Centennial Student Union (CSU) is a 213,000-square-foot space that serves as a central campus hub. The CSU is home to many university departments, including Student Activities, Student Government, The Reporter, Counseling Center, Kearney International Center, Multicultural Center, Women's Center, Veterans Resource Center, LGBT Center, Maverick Bullpen, Ostrander Auditorium, and the campus bookstore.

==== Student activities ====
Student Activities at MNSU is home to a wide variety of departments, including Registered Student Organizations (RSOs), Community Engagement Office, Greek Life & Off-Campus Housing, and Student Events Team. Student Events Team hosts campus-wide events including homecoming concerts and the annual CSU Haunted House Takeover.

==== LGBT center ====
MNSU is home to the nation's second-oldest LGBT resource center for students. Originally called the "Alternative Lifestyles Office", the center was founded by Minnesota State alumnus James Chalgren in 1977. Located in the Centennial Student Union, it is an independent office within the university's division of Student Affairs. According to The Advocate, Minnesota State was voted one of the nation's top 100 campuses for LGBT students.

== Athletics ==
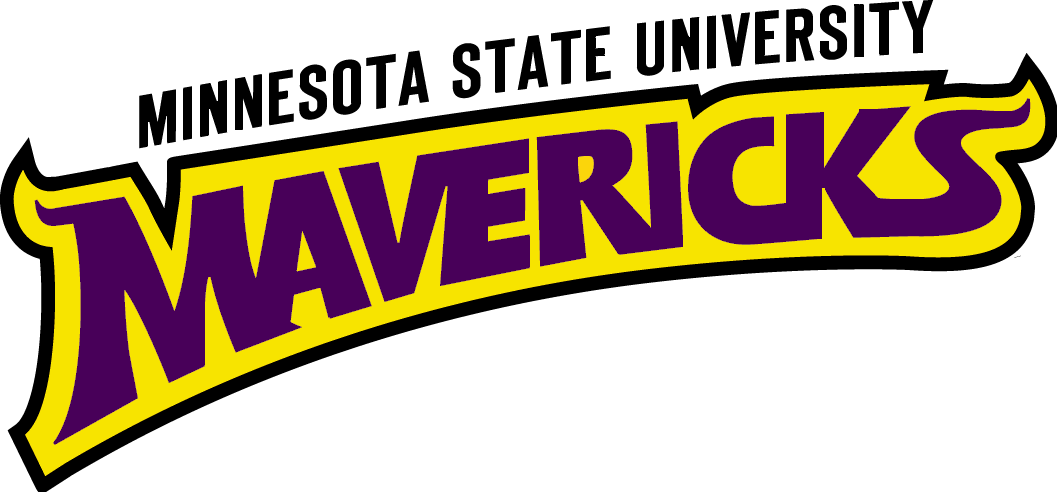
Logo of the Minnesota State Mavericks

The Minnesota State Mavericks consists of eight men's and ten women's varsity teams. More than 650 students participate in athletics each year for the university. It offers teams in men's and women's hockey and basketball, football, baseball, golf, women's swimming, track, cross country, women's tennis, wrestling, soccer, golf, volleyball, and softball. The men's and women's ice hockey teams both compete in NCAA Division I—the men in the Central Collegiate Hockey Association (CCHA) and the women in the Western Collegiate Hockey Association (WCHA). The men's team had competed in the WCHA through the 2020–21 season, but was one of the seven men's WCHA members that left after that season to reestablish the CCHA, leading to the WCHA disbanding its men's division. Other university athletic teams began competing in the Northern Sun Intercollegiate Conference of NCAA Division II in 2008–09 following the disbandment of the North Central Conference.

The school mascot is Stomper the Maverick, a caricature of a wild steer. The school colors are purple and gold, officially announced in 1892. In 1926, the M club voted to change the athletic teams' colors to burnt orange and navy blue because purple and gold were too similar to Winona State University's colors. The orange and blue uniforms were discontinued in 1955.

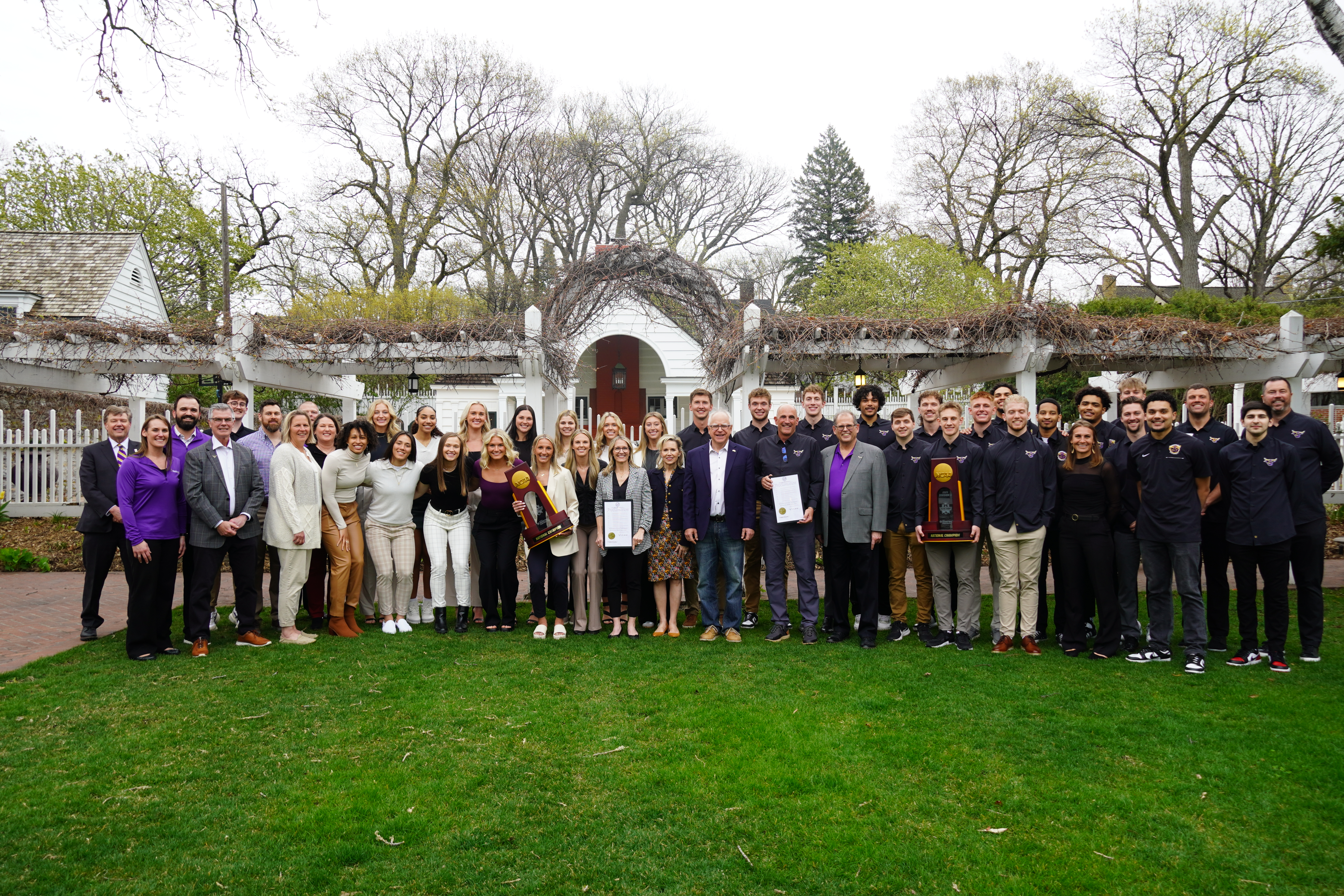
Championship men's and women's basketball teams meeting Gov. Tim Walz in 2024

Minnesota State athletics teams have placed favorably in national competitions in NCAA Division II athletics in several sports including hockey, football, baseball, women's basketball, men's basketball, men's track & field, wrestling, women's soccer and softball. Since 1993, the Mavericks have captured the most individual national championships out of all sixteen colleges and universities in the Northern Sun Conference. The 2015 season marked the 14th straight year that the Mavericks finished in the top 25 in the country in the national standings, and the seventh time Minnesota State had posted a top-five placing for the Learfield Sports Directors' Cup. It has also won the NSIC US Bank All-Sports Award four times and placed second twice during the last six-year period of the 2008–2015 competition seasons. In 2024, the Mavericks won the men's and women's Division II basketball tournaments, making them the first school in four decades to win both in the same year.

The Minnesota State fight song is "The Minnesota State Rouser", also known as the "Maverick Rouser". It is played at all the athletics events as well as other events, along with the school song, "The Minnesota State Hymn". The Minnesota State University Marching Band is called the "Maverick Machine", and drives enthusiasm and school spirit at athletics events.

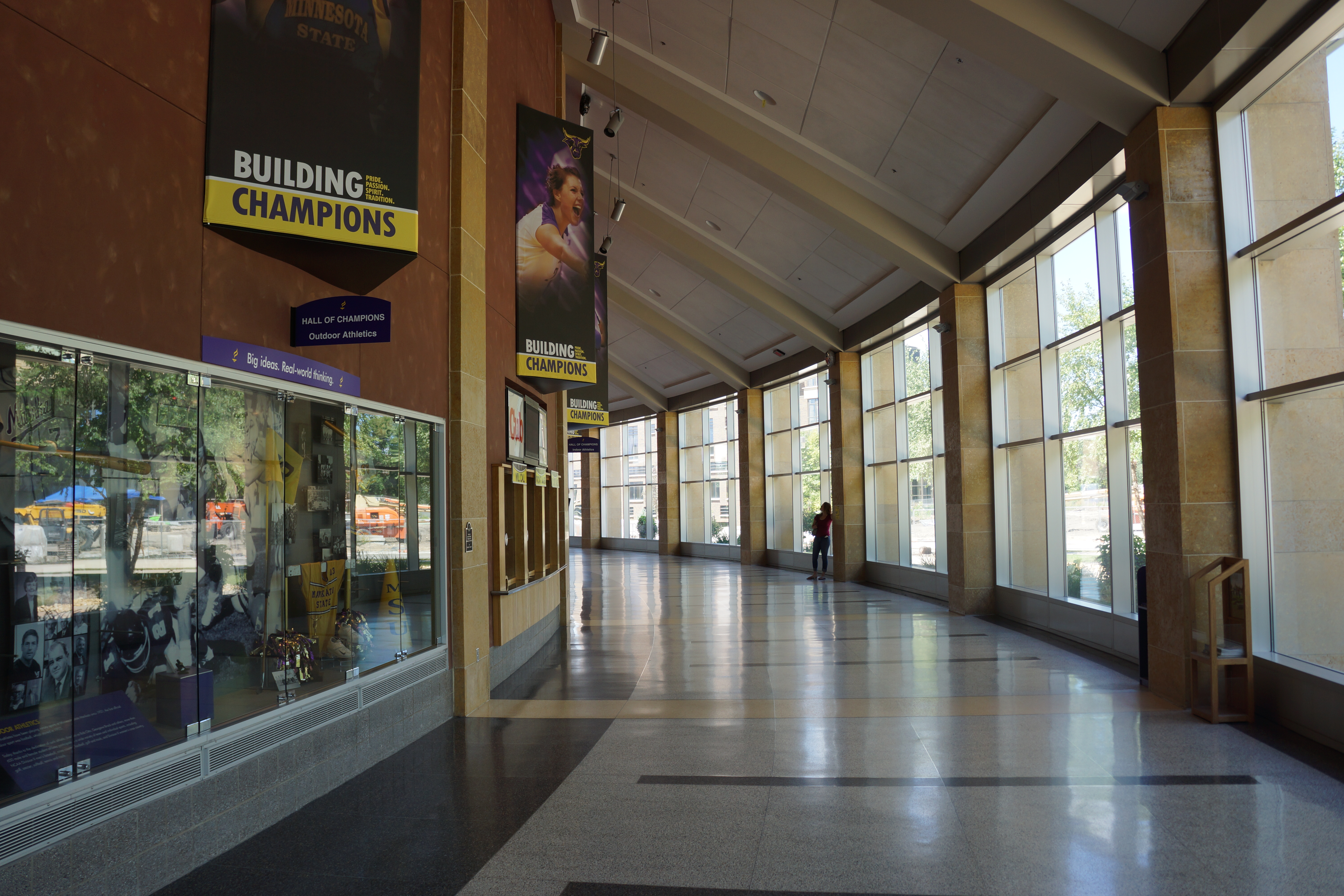
Constructed in 2000, the Taylor Center is home to Bresnan Arena.

Minnesota State hosted the Minnesota Vikings summer training camp from 1966 to 2017. Each year over 60,000 fans traveled to Blakeslee Stadium to watch the team practice, attend signing events and meet and greets, followed by a fireworks show. In 2017, the Vikings ownership announced they would move the annual tradition to Eagan, Minnesota, following the construction of a new facility. The Vikings have since established a scholarship for Minnesota State students.

=== Facility renovations and upgrades ===
The Taylor Center opened in 2000, and was made possible by the donations of alumnus Glen Taylor. The 4,800-seat facility houses Maverick basketball, volleyball and wrestling teams. The MNSU Admissions office is also there, and the 5,000 square-foot Hall of Champions showcases the university's history. In addition to Minnesota State Mavericks events, the Taylor Center hosts commencement ceremonies, concerts and lectures.

== Notable people ==
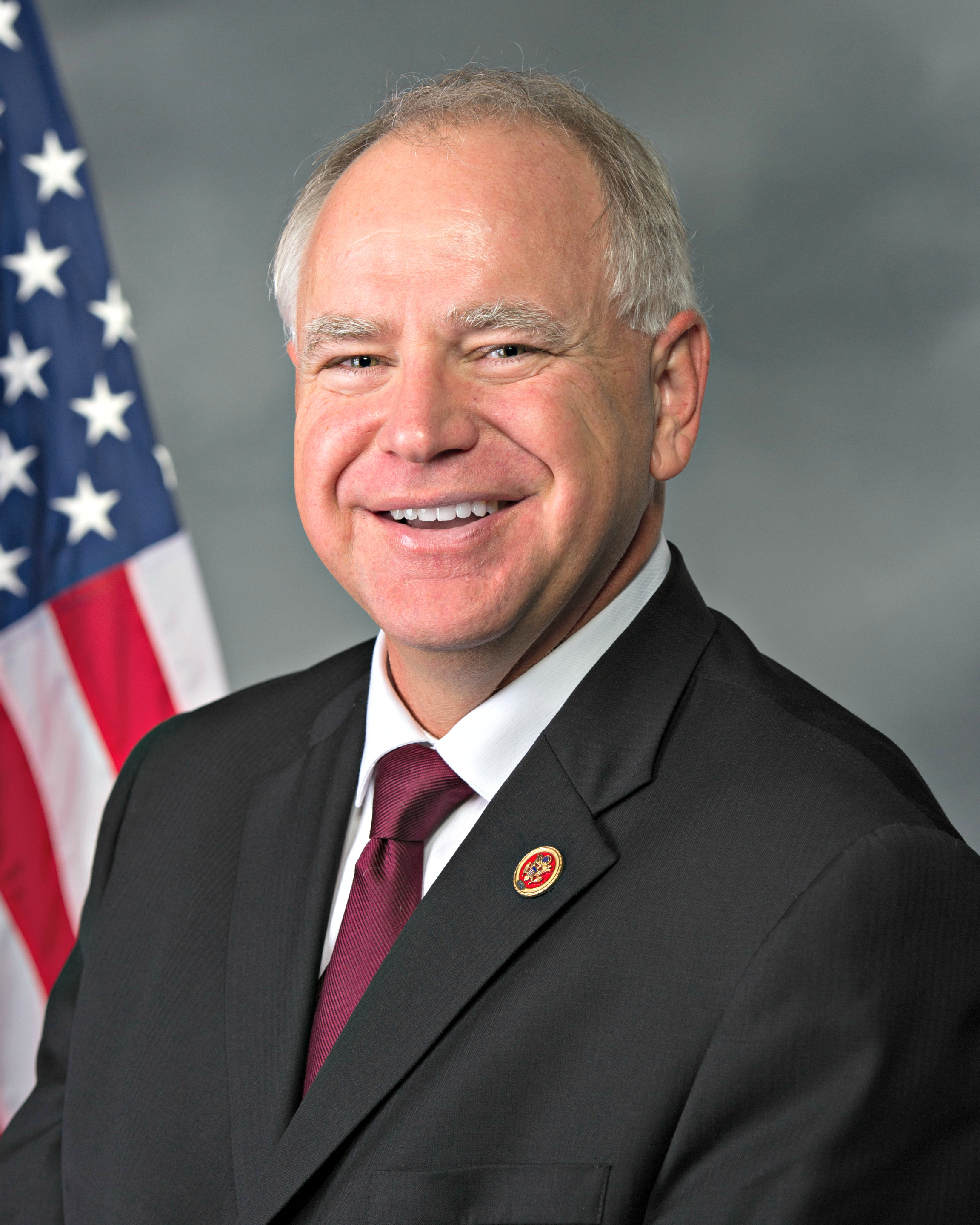
Tim Walz (M.S., 2001) – 41st governor of Minnesota and 2024 Democratic vice-presidential nominee

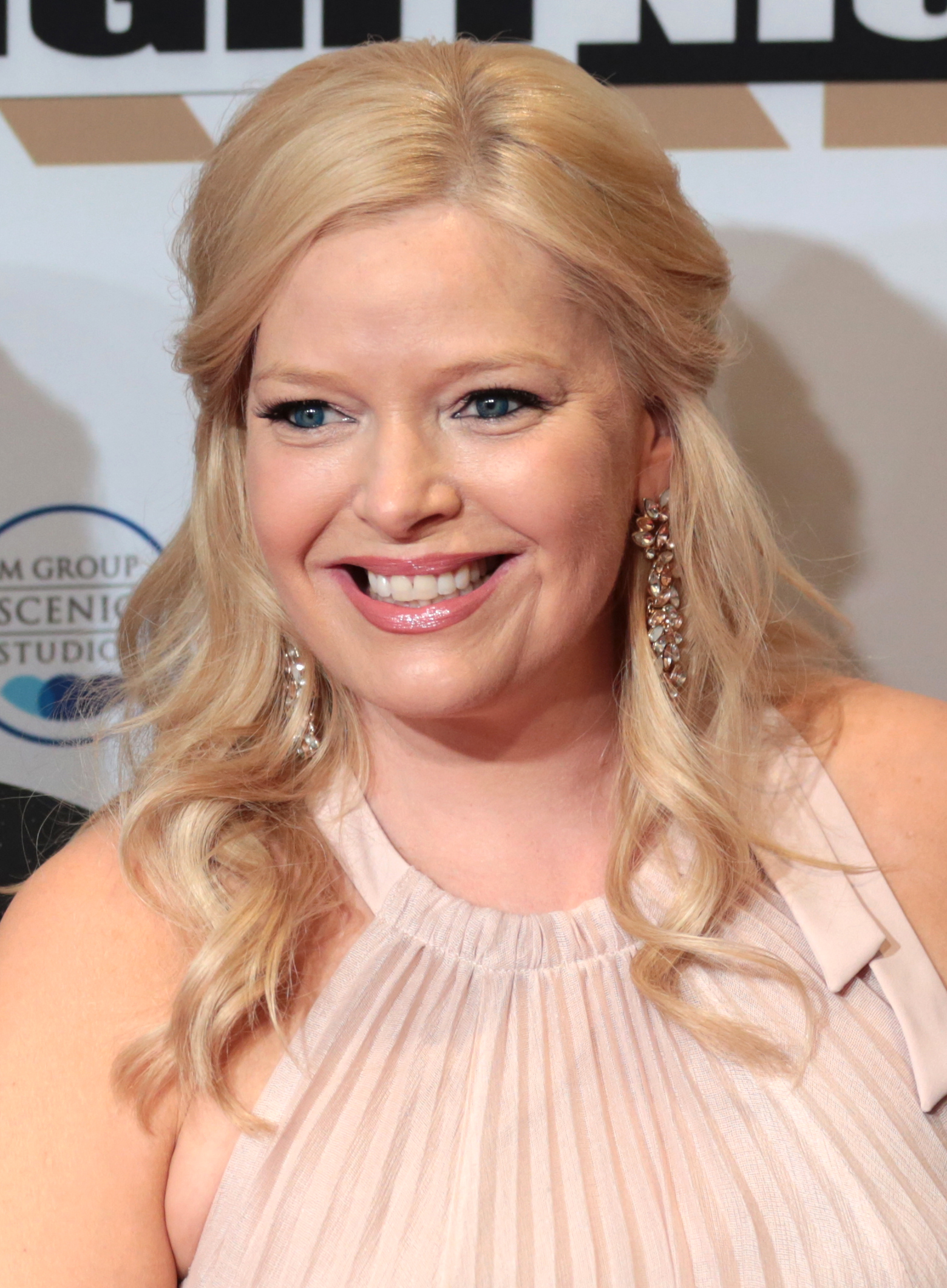
Melissa Peterman (B.F.A.) – actress, Reba

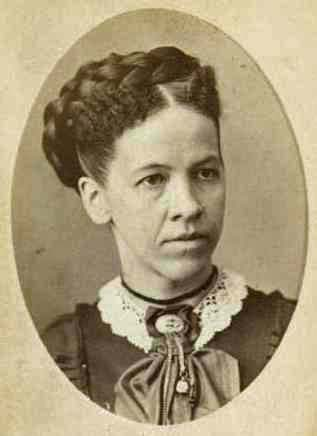
Julia Sears – academic and suffragist

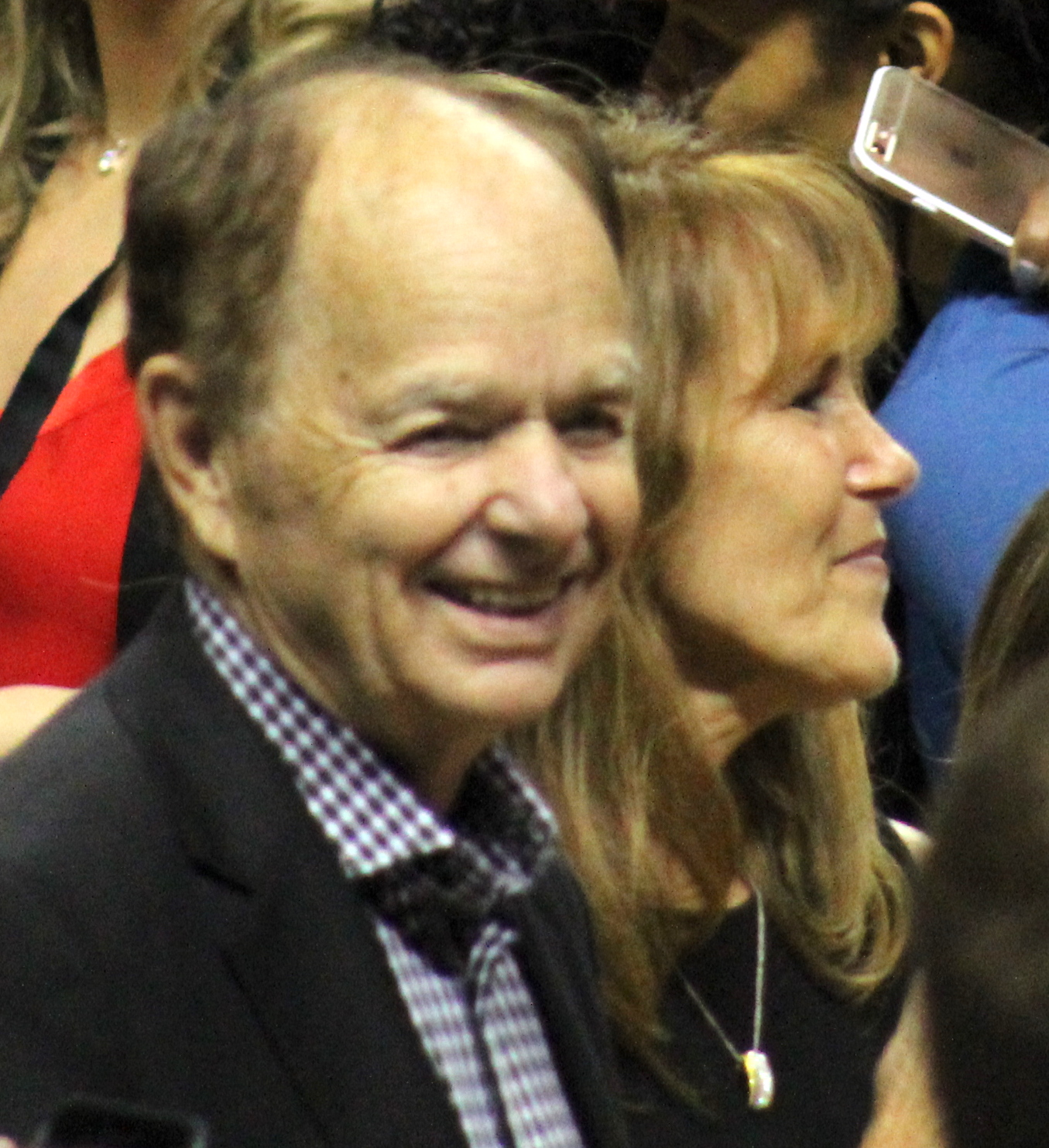
Glen Taylor (B.S., 1962) – business magnate

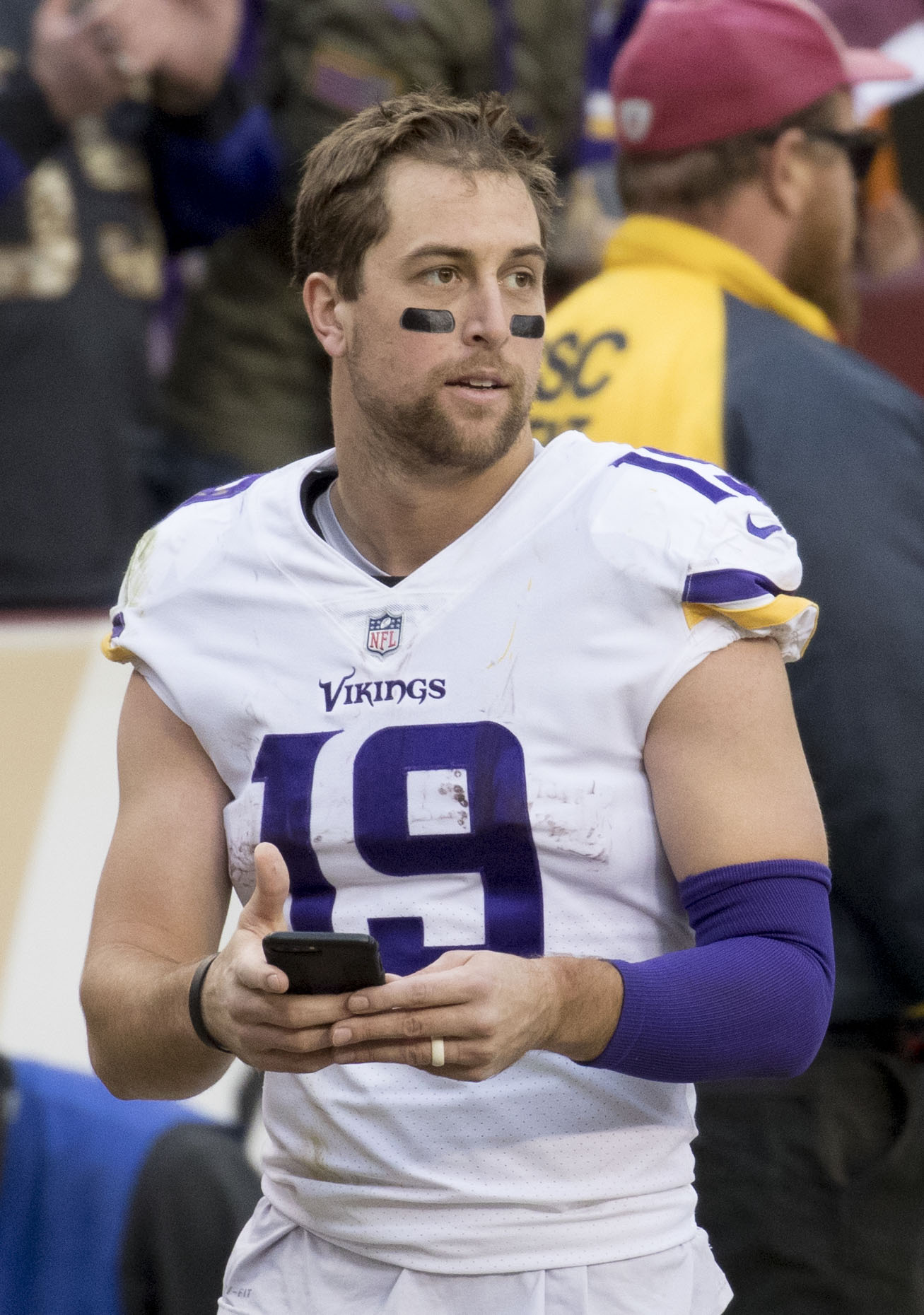
Adam Thielen (B.S., 2012) – American football wide receiver

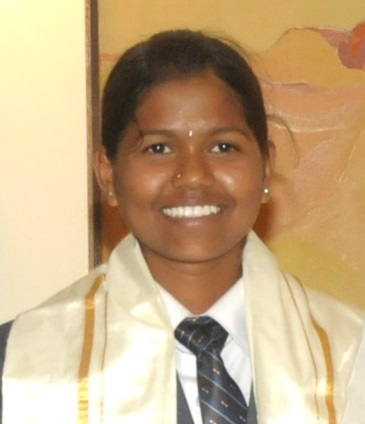
Malavath Poorna – Indian mountaineer, youngest female to scale Mount Everest

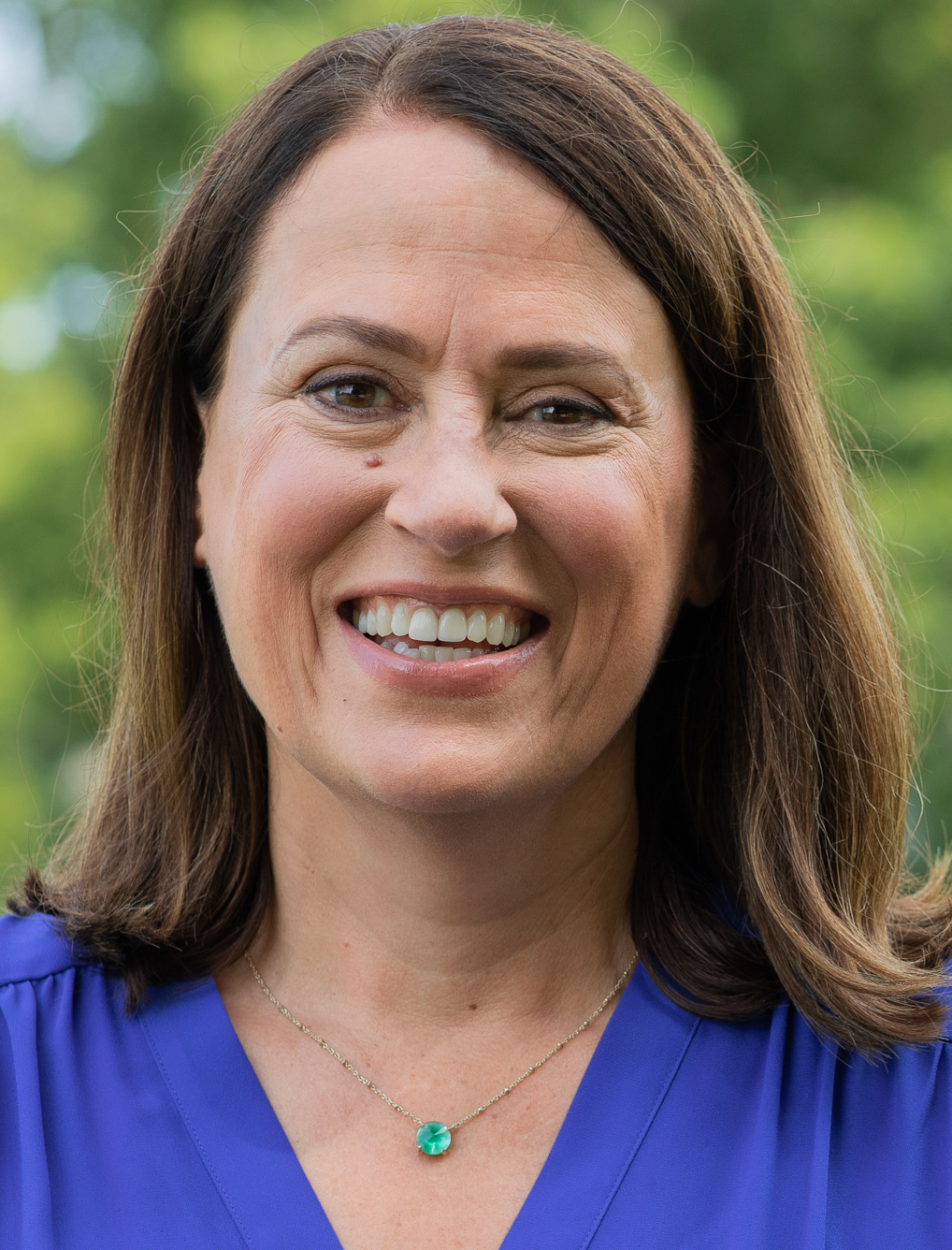
Theresa Greenfield (B.A., 1987) – 2020 U.S. Senate candidate

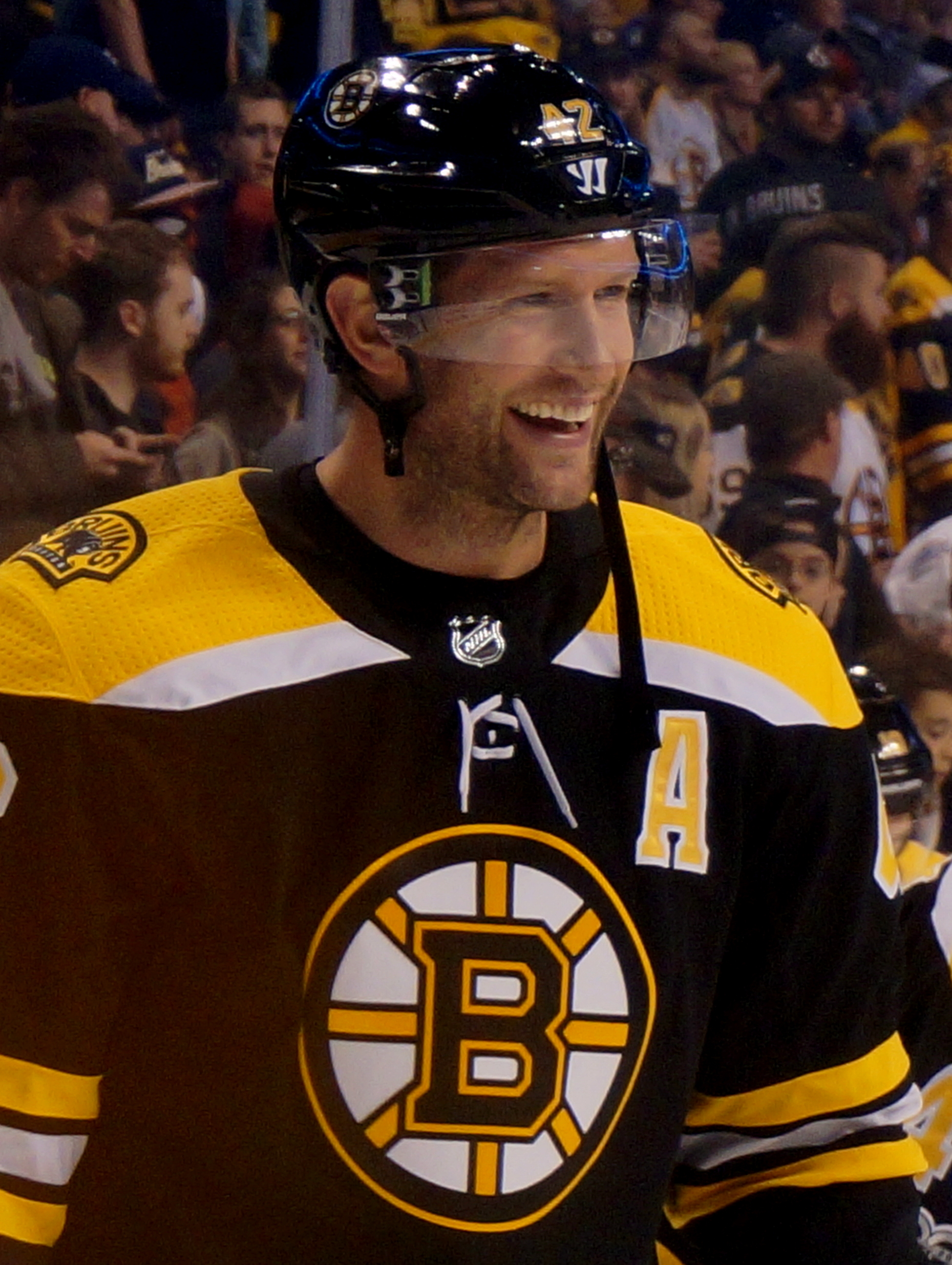
David Backes (B.S., 2014) – Olympic ice hockey forward

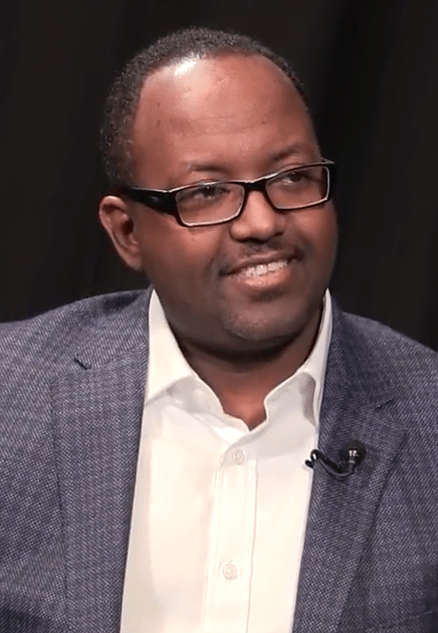
Mohamed Aden Tiiceey (M.A., 2005) – former president, Himan and Heeb

== See also ==
- List of colleges and universities in Minnesota
