= The Minnesota State Hymn =

The Minnesota State Hymn is the institutional anthem of the Minnesota State University, Mankato. It has played at all graduation and official ceremonies since December 2000. It was written by Richard Robbins and Roger Sheffer.

== Lyrics ==
Minnesota State, we hail; Hail the purple and the gold
All alumni, old and new, take you with them when they go.
From the hilltop, from the prairie, Where the river bends to lead them
We are walking proud and strong, Minnesota State on and on.

Racha Macha, MSU, now and always we'll be true
In the classroom, on the mall, by the fountain, spring or fall
In the cities, in their towers, in the nations far from home.
Minnesota State we hail to you. Purple and gold we're ever true.
