= Blakeslee Stadium =

Football stadium in Mankato, Minnesota

- "The Blake"
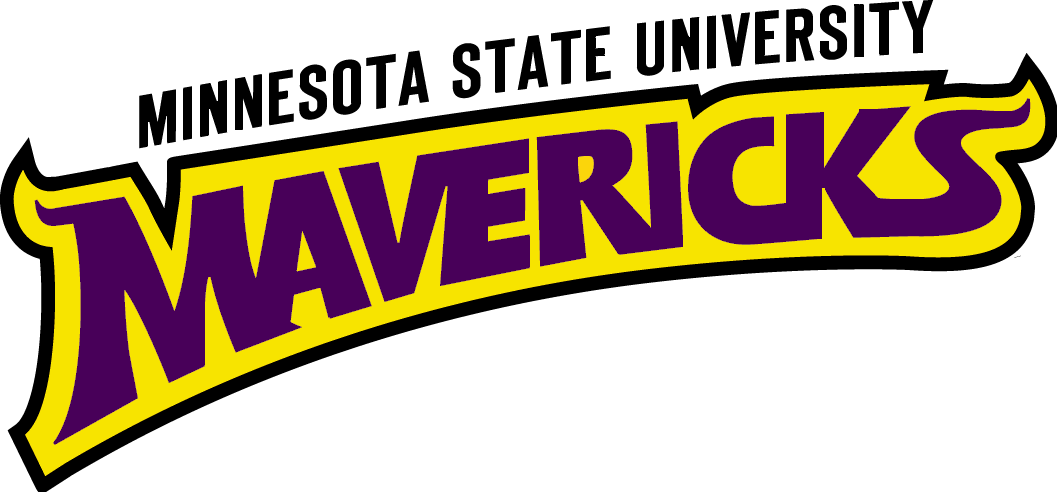

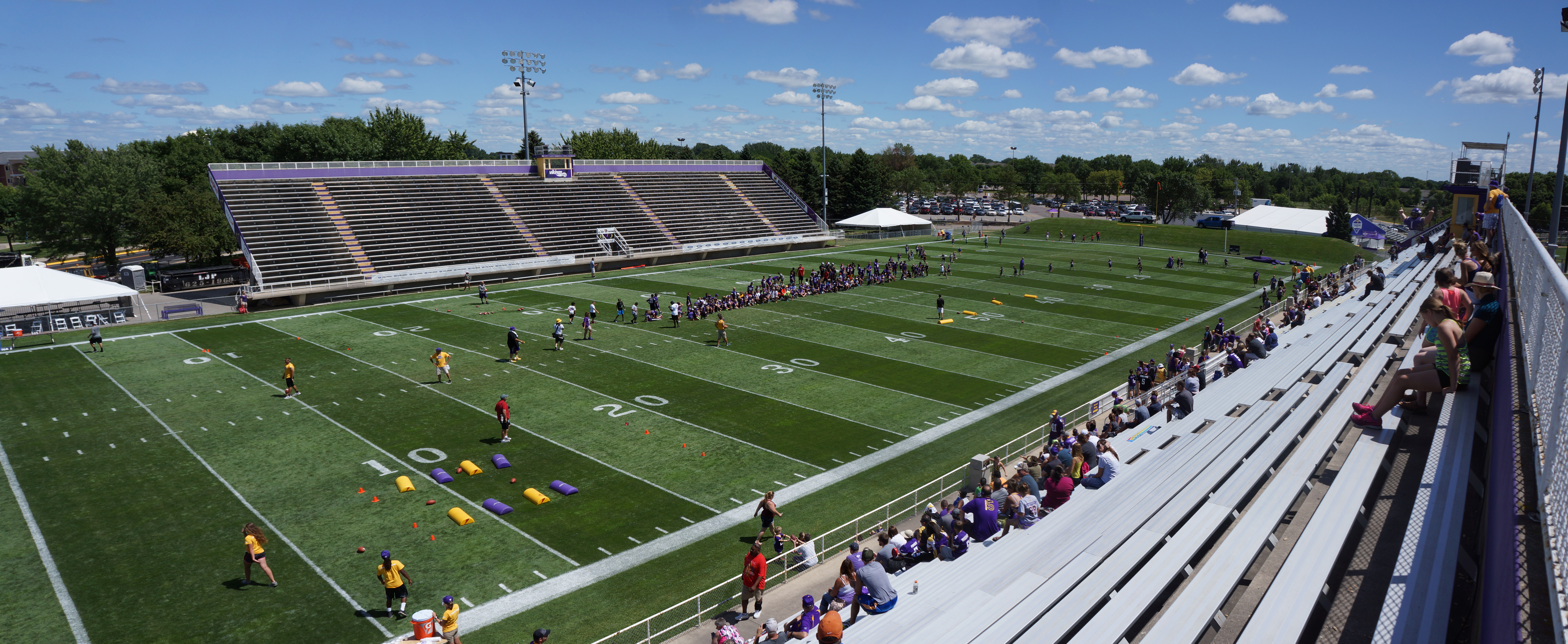
- View of the stadium in 2016
- Interactive map of Blakeslee Stadium
- Address: 161 Stadium Road; Mankato, MN; United States
- Coordinates: 44.144°N 93.995°W
- Owner: Minnesota State University, Mankato
- Operator: Minnesota State University, Mankato
- Capacity: 7,500
- Type: Stadium
- Surface: Natural Grass
- Record attendance: 7,187 (October 10, 2015 vs. Augustana); 10,000 at Vikings Training Camp
- Current use: American football

Construction
- Groundbreaking: 1961
- Opened: 1962; 64 years ago
- Cost: $80,000 ($851,485 in 2025 dollars)

Tenant
- Minnesota State Mavericks football

Website
- msumavericks.com/blakeslee-stadium

Blakeslee Stadium is an American football stadium located on the southern edge of the Minnesota State University, Mankato campus. Primarily used for American football, it is the home field of the Minnesota State Mavericks football —an NCAA Division II team— and hosted the training camp for the Minnesota Vikings of the National Football League (NFL) from 1966 to 2017.

== History ==
=== Overview ===
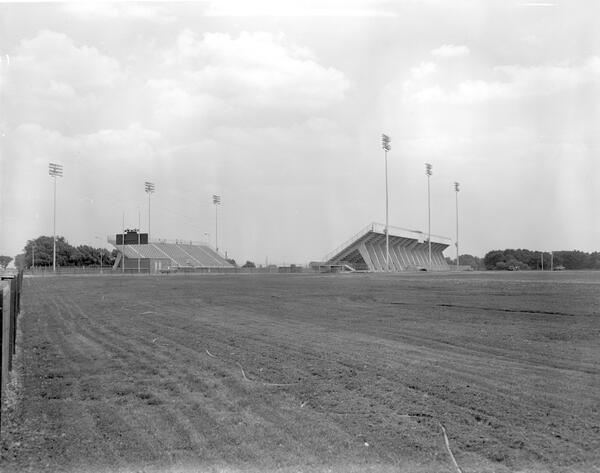
Interior view of the venue in 1966

Built in 1962, the stadium holds 7,000 seats and facilitates a variety of events, including marching band performances and drum and bugle corps competitions.

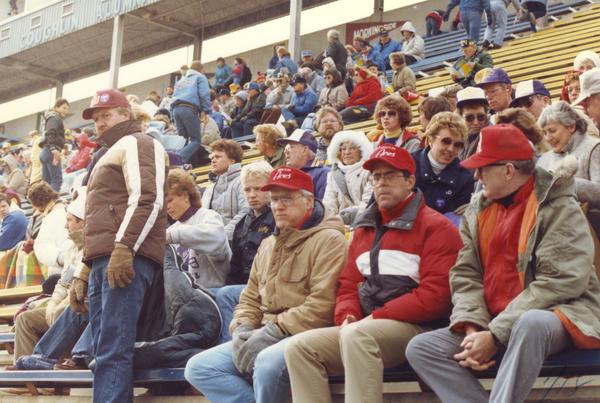
Mankato State fans in the 1990s

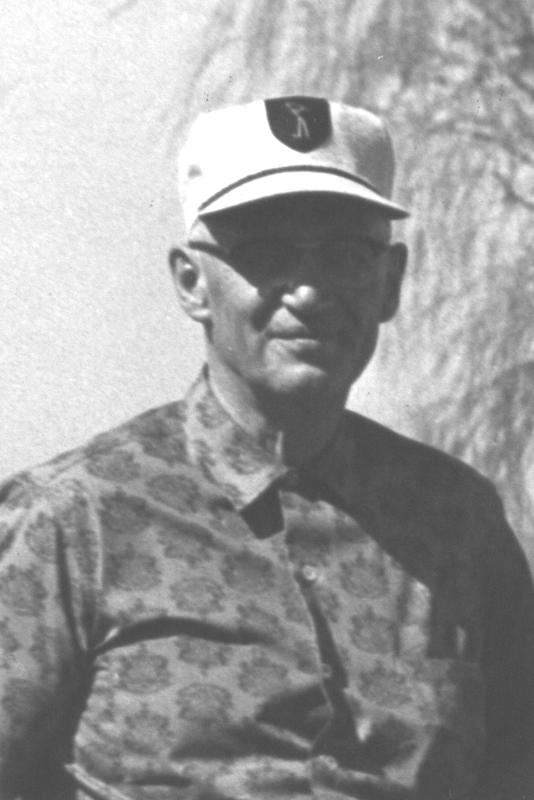
Coach Carlyn P. Blakeslee

It is named after Carlyn P. Blakeslee, who served as a coach, administrator, and Health and Physical Education professor at Minnesota State from 1921 until his retirement in 1961.

In 2022, the stadium hosted Hockey Day Minnesota, an annual series of outdoor ice hockey games sponsored by the Minnesota Wild of the National Hockey League (NHL) and FanDuel Sports Network North.

=== Renovation and replacement plans ===
Plans for replacing the more than 55-year-old structure have been discussed by Minnesota State University.
