= Minnesota State Mavericks men's ice hockey statistical leaders =

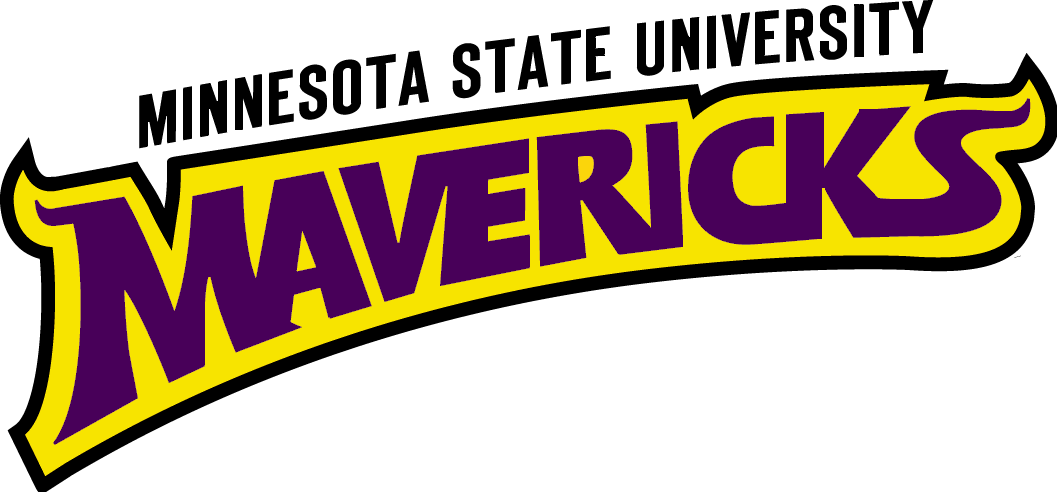

The Minnesota State Mavericks men's ice hockey statistical leaders are individual statistical leaders of the Minnesota State Mavericks men's ice hockey program in various categories, including goals, assists, points, and saves. Within those areas, the lists identify single-game, single-season, and career leaders. The Mavericks represent Minnesota State University in the NCAA's Central Collegiate Hockey Association.

Minnesota State began competing in intercollegiate ice hockey in 1969. These lists are updated through the end of the 2020–21 season.

== Goals ==
Career
Rk	Player	Goals	Seasons
1	Tom Kern	129	1979–80 1980–81 1981–82 1982–83
2	Pat Carroll	123	1981–82 1982–83 1983–84 1984–85
3	Tyler Deis	90	1995–96 1996–97 1997–98 1998–99
4	Larry Long	89	1977–78 1978–79 1979–80 1980–81
5	Steve Forliti	83	1977–78 1978–79 1979–80 1980–81
6	Larry Ward	77	1975–76 1976–77 1977–78 1978–79
7	Greg Larson	76	1977–78 1978–79 1979–80 1980–81
8	Bill Essel	75	1974–75 1975–76 1976–77 1977–78
9	Marc Michaelis	71	2016–17 2017–18 2018–19 2019–20
10	John Passolt	68	1979–80 1980–81 1981–82
	Shane Joseph	68	1999–00 2000–01 2001–02 2002–03 2003–04

Season
Rk	Player	Goals	Season
1	Tom Kern	43	1982–83
2	Pat Carroll	42	1982–83
3	Pat Carroll	36	1984–85
4	Steve Forliti	32	1979–80
	Tom Kern	32	1981–82
6	Larry Ward	31	1978–79
	John Passolt	31	1979–80
8	Paul Mattson	30	1979–80
	Tyler Deis	30	1995–96
10	Greg Larson	29	1979–80
	Tom Kern	29	1979–80
	Shane Joseph	29	2002–03

Single Game
Rk	Player	Goals	Season	Opponent
1	Paul Mattson	6	1979–80	UW-Eau Claire

== Assists ==
Career
Rk	Player	Assists	Seasons
1	Ryan Rintoul	114	1994–95 1995–96 1996–97 1997–98
2	Matt Leitner	113	2011–12 2012–13 2013–14 2014–15
	Steve Forliti	113	1977–78 1978–79 1979–80 1980–81
4	Tom Kern	110	1979–80 1980–81 1981–82 1982–83
5	John Passolt	105	1979–80 1980–81 1981–82
	Jon Hill	105	1981–82 1982–83 1983–84 1984–85
7	Aaron Fox	103	1996–97 1997–98 1998–99 1999–00
8	Pat Carroll	101	1981–82 1982–83 1983–84 1984–85
9	Greg Larson	92	1977–78 1978–79 1979–80 1980–81
	Carl Davis	92	1975–76 1976–77 1977–78 1978–79

Season
Rk	Player	Assists	Season
1	John Passolt	46	1979–80
	Pat Carroll	46	1982–83
3	Steve Forliti	44	1979–80
4	Dave Saatzer	42	1978–79
5	Ryan Rintoul	39	1995–96
6	Steve Forliti	38	1978–79
	Aaron Fox	38	1999–00
8	Carl Davis	37	1978–79
	Greg Larson	37	1979–80
10	Mike Weinkauf	36	1979–80
	Shane Joseph	36	2002–03
	Grant Stevenson	36	2002–03

Single Game
Rk	Player	Assists	Season	Opponent
1	Steve Forliti	7	1979–80	UW-Eau Claire

== Points ==
Career
Rk	Player	Points	Seasons
1	Tom Kern	239	1979–80 1980–81 1981–82 1982–83
2	Pat Carroll	224	1981–82 1982–83 1983–84 1984–85
3	Steve Forliti	196	1977–78 1978–79 1979–80 1980–81
4	John Passolt	173	1979–80 1980–81 1981–82
5	Ryan Rintoul	169	1994–95 1995–96 1996–97 1997–98
6	John Hill	168	1981–82 1982–83 1983–84 1984–85
	Greg Larson	168	1977–78 1978–79 1979–80 1980–81
8	Tyler Deis	164	1995–96 1996–97 1997–98 1998–99
	Aaron Fox	164	1996–97 1997–98 1998–99 1999–00
10	Matt Leitner	162	2011–12 2012–13 2013–14 2014–15
	Marc Michaelis	162	2016–17 2017–18 2018–19 2019–20

Season
Rk	Player	Points	Season
1	Pat Carroll	88	1982–83
2	John Passolt	77	1979–80
3	Steve Forliti	76	1979–80
	Tom Kern	76	1982–83
5	Greg Larson	66	1979–80
	Pat Carroll	66	1984–85
7	Shane Joseph	65	2002–03
8	Grant Stevenson	63	2002–03
9	Tom Kern	62	1979–80
10	Steve Forliti	60	1978–79

Single Game
Rk	Player	Points	Season	Opponent
1	Steve Forliti	9	1979–80	UW-Eau Claire

== Saves ==
Career
Rk	Player	Saves	Seasons
1	Steve Carroll	3,228	1977–78 1978–79 1979–80 1980–81
2	Ken Hilgert	2,874	1984–85 1985–86 1986–87 1987–88
3	Mike Zacharias	2,765	2005–06 2006–07 2007–08 2008–09
4	Dryden McKay	2,749	2018–19 2019–20 2020–21 2021–22
5	Alex Tracy	2,690	2022–23 2023–24 2024–25 2025–26
6	Eric Pateman	2,553	1998–99 1999–00 2000–01 2001–02
7	Jon Volp	2,142	2001–02 2002–03 2003–04 2004–05
8	Ron Durner	1,821	1972–73 1973–74 1974–75 1975–76

Season
Rk	Player	Saves	Season
1	Steve Carroll	1,090	1978–79
2	Steve Carroll	1,083	1980–81
3	Steve Carroll	1,055	1979–80
4	Mike Zacharias	1,038	2008–09
5	Eric Pateman	1,024	1999–00
6	Alex Tracy	961	2024–25
7	Brian Langlot	956	1992–93

Single Game
Rk	Player	Saves	Season	Opponent
1	Ken Hupila	65	1972–73	
2	Austin F Lee	56	2011–12	UMD
