= Minnesota State Mavericks men's ice hockey =

- Current season
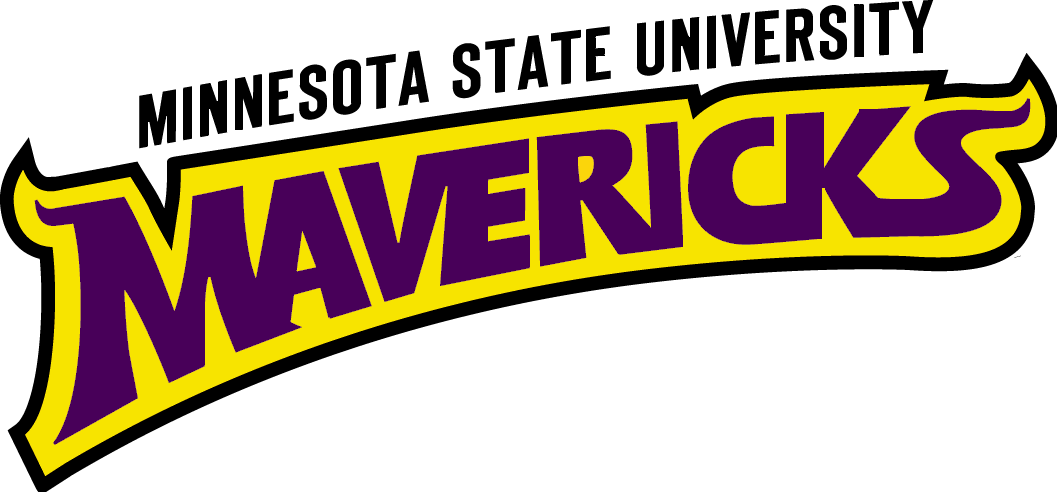
- University: Minnesota State University
- Conference: CCHA
- First season: 1969–70
- Head coach: Luke Strand; 3rd season, 45–24–7 (.638)
- Assistant coaches: Troy G. Ward; Keith Paulsen; Cory McCracken
- Arena: Mayo Clinic Health System Event Center; Mankato, Minnesota
- Colors: Purple and gold
- Fight song: The Minnesota State Rouser
- Mascot: Stomper the Maverick

NCAA tournament champions
- DII: 1980

NCAA tournament runner-up
- DI: 2022; DII: 1979; DIII: 1991

NCAA tournament Frozen Four
- DI: 2021, 2022; DII: 1978, 1979, 1980, 1981; DIII: 1986, 1990, 1991

NCAA tournament appearances
- DI: 2003, 2013, 2014, 2015, 2018, 2019, 2021, 2022, 2023, 2025, 2026; DII: 1978, 1979, 1980, 1981, 1982, 1983; DIII: 1985, 1986, 1990, 1991, 1992

Conference tournament champions
- WIHA: 1975, 1976, 1979, 1980; WCHA: 2014, 2015, 2019; CCHA: 2022, 2023, 2025, 2026

Conference regular season champions
- NCHA: 1981, 1986, 1987, 1991; WCHA: 2015, 2016, 2018, 2019, 2020, 2021; CCHA: 2022, 2023, 2025, 2026

Current uniform
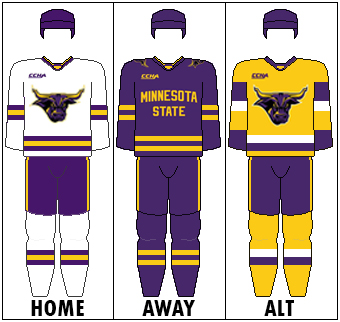

The Minnesota State Mavericks men's ice hockey team is an NCAA Division I college ice hockey program that represents Minnesota State University, Mankato. The Mavericks compete in the Central Collegiate Hockey Association (CCHA). Their home arena is the Mayo Clinic Health System Event Center located in downtown Mankato, Minnesota.

== History ==
=== Early beginnings: 1930s–1940s ===
In the early 1930s, students at Minnesota State, then Mankato State Teachers College (MSTC), first expressed interest in forming a hockey team to represent the university. The first hockey team at MSTC was formed in 1935, sponsored by faculty member Al Theide, who also coached the team. The 1935 squad played a few games against local community teams and other colleges before disbanding at the end of the school year.

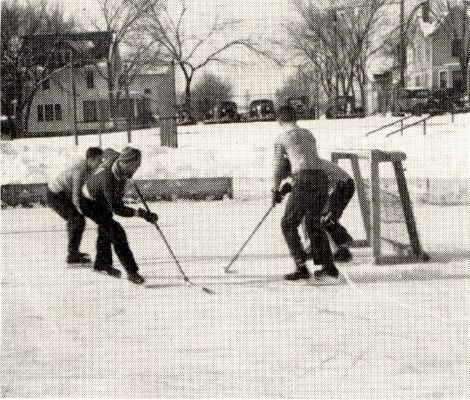
The 1941 MSTC Indians playing a hockey game.

Interest in forming a new team remained throughout the mid-to-late 1930s. In 1939, MSTC student Nic Schultz put out an ad in the MSTC school newspaper calling students interested in hockey to meet with him to create a team. After this, Schultz contacted MSTC Athletic Coordinator C. P. Blakeslee and convinced him to allow the newly formed team to borrow some of the MSTC football team’s equipment to play in. The team did not have many resources, relying on donated sticks and skates and using old magazines as shin guards. They did not have any practices, with all their ice time coming in the team’s five games played against local community teams, mostly in the Mankato area. Their first game came against the North Mankato Juniors in a 3-7 loss. The 1939 team had no home ice rink, nor did they even have a head coach. The team ended their first season with a record of 1-4, with their lone win coming against Madison Lake.

At the beginning of the 1940 season, the team was approached by MSTC Health Education Professor W. E. Cushman who offered to coach the team. The team gained more legitimacy and donated money to purchase lumber for the construction of a practice rink formed by flooding the MSTC football field. Cushman would coach the team as a player-coach for the next two seasons as the Indians played more local teams and finished around .500. After the 1941 season, the team disbanded. Throughout the 1940s, interest remained in re-forming a team, though nothing materialized.

=== Increasing interest in hockey: 1950s–1960s ===
Interest remained high for the formation of a MSTC Indians hockey team in the early-to-mid 1950s. Creating a team became an annual conversation within the university with the occasional game scheduled against local community teams, though nothing substantial formed due to a lack of personnel. In late 1956, a group of MSTC students met with the athletics board to discuss the addition of intercollegiate hockey. While the request was once again denied, the school agreed to the formation of an intramural hockey organization within the school. Several students from the intramural teams competed in extramural events against local community teams and Gustavus Adolphus College. Throughout the late 1950s, multiple petitions were submitted to the school regarding the creation of an intercollegiate hockey team, though all were rejected, chiefly due to a lack of funding and equipment.

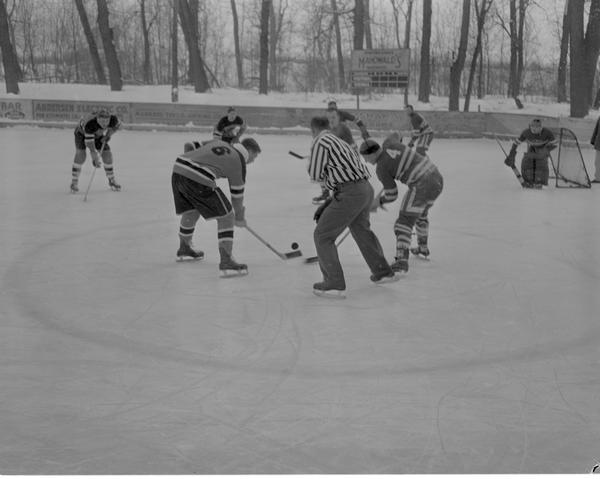
The 1959 Snow Day Game between the MSC Indians and GAC Gusties.

In 1959, MSTC, now Mankato State College (MSC), saw their best opportunity for the creation of a hockey team since the 1940s. As part of an annual “Snow Day Celebration”, the school formed an official hockey team and played one officially sanctioned intercollegiate game against Gustavus Adolphus College as part of the Snow Day events. The school advertised that if interest in the event was high, there would be a possibility of a permanent intercollegiate hockey team for the school. A few hundred spectators attended the Snow Day game as the Indians lost to the Gusties 0-4. This event marked MSC’s first official intercollegiate game since the 1940s. Afterwards, the university newspaper reported that the interest in hockey indicated the possibility of a team within a few seasons or less. This ended up not being the case as the school once again declined to create a team due to a lack of funding and soon removed the intramural team as well. That did not last long though, as by 1963, the school once again permitted intramural teams after petitioning by students.

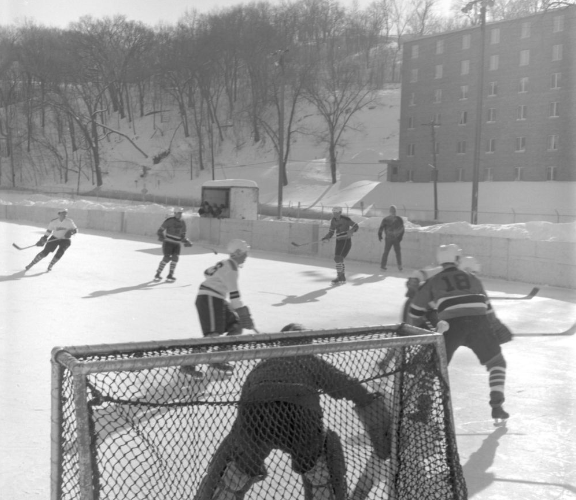
A 1969 extramural hockey game between the MSC Indians and another team.

In late 1965, the school selected the best players from each intramural team to form an extramural team. This team was coached by Physical Education Instructor Don Brose and played local community teams and other colleges, compiling a 1-5 record in their first season, with several closely contested losses. Throughout the late 1960s, the extramural team gained popularity and saw more success on the ice. The extramural Indians continued playing many different colleges from Minnesota as a large part of their schedule, often playing games against those schools' varsity teams. Finally, in early 1968, MSC approved a re-allocation of funds which allowed the school to form an official NCAA intercollegiate hockey team. The 1968-69 season was the last season for the extramural hockey team at MSC before they elevated the team at the start of the 1969-70 season.

=== Beginning the Don Brose Era in Division II: 1969–1984 ===
The Mankato State College Indians men's ice hockey team commenced play as a varsity sport in 1969-70. For monetary reasons, the school was not able to play home games in an indoor ice rink, instead opting to build an outdoor rink. At the time, schools with outdoor ice rinks were viewed to be at a competitive disadvantage. For this reason, head coach Don Brose decided the team would compete independent of conference affiliation, as most of the teams in the Minnesota Intercollegiate Athletic Conference had indoor rinks, thus putting MSC at a distinct disadvantage in conference play. The team competed in the NCAA College Division and played their first varsity games against the St. Cloud State Huskies. The Indians' first goal was scored by Jim Lang, though the team lost in a two game sweep. The team rebounded soon after, earning their first win against the Stout State Blue Devils, a game in which MSC's Dave Kramer scored the team's first ever hat trick. The Indians first season was relatively uneventful, as the team finished with a 5-8-1 record. The Indians saw a great improvement in their second season as they only lost two games, en route to a 15-2-1 record, though they did not qualify for the NCAA playoffs. The next several years of Indian hockey were relatively uneventful, though the team did transition into Division II after the 1973 split of the NCAA College Division was split into Division II and Division III.

In 1974, the Indians finally got their long-awaited indoor rink, with the construction of All Seasons Arena a few blocks away from campus. In the 1975 season, the Indians decided, along with Chicago Circle, to hold the first Western Regional Tournament. In lieu of a national championship tournament for Division II, it was decided that the Western Division II teams would hold a Western Tournament to crown a champion, similar to how the Eastern teams held the ECAC 2 Tournament to crown a champion. At times, the Western Regional Tournament was even referred to as the national championship, as there was no official national championship held by the NCAA. The Indians won the inaugural Western Regional Tournament with a sweep of Chicago Circle. In 1976, they won the tournament again, this time with a 5–2 victory over Hamline. In 1977, Mankato State College, now Mankato State University (MSU), changed the name of all its sports teams from the Indians to the Mavericks. With the 1977–78 season, the NCAA finally began holding a Division II men's ice hockey tournament. The Western teams continued to hold a Western Regional Tournament as no Western conference sponsored a conference championship. While it did not guarantee an automatic bid into the new tournament, the NCAA did give extra consideration to the winner of the Western Tournament. The 1978 Western Tournament saw the Mavericks finish as runners-up, and the NCAA selected the team to compete in their first national tournament. The Mavericks finished third place in the first ever Division II ice hockey national tournament. The 1979 Western Tournament proved to be a strange one. After the first sudden-death overtime, the Mavericks were tied with the Chicago Circle Flames at 4–4. Given the opportunity to continue playing, the head coaches of both teams came together and jointly decided to end the game at a 4–4 tie with the thought that the NCAA would need to choose both teams for the national tournament if neither team won. Thus, both teams claimed joint shares of the Western Tournament Championship. This strategy proved to be successful, as both the Mavericks and Flames were chosen to the national tournament. The Mavericks would go on to improve their previous season's finish as they ended as runners-up in the 1979 tournament after falling to UMass Lowell 4–6 in the final. The 1979–80 season proved to be one of the Mavericks' most successful to date. The team finished the season 26–9–1 after the regular season and easily coasted to a Western Tournament championship with a 14 goal victory over St. Scholastica. The Mavs were selected to the 1980 national tournament as the third seeded team and played their first game against UMass Lowell, avenging last season's loss with a 8–1 victory. The championship game was against Elmira, in which the Mavs quickly gained a 3–0 lead, then finished off the game to win 5–2 and claim their first national championship. Following the 1979–80 season, several schools in Wisconsin and Minnesota met to create the NCHA, thus ending the Mavericks 11 season streak as an Independent. The 1980–81 proved to be another successful season, with the Mavericks finishing first in the NCHA and finishing third in the national tournament. The Mavericks would qualify for the national tournament in the next two seasons, falling in the quarterfinal round both times. At the end of the 1982-83 season, Don Brose left the team on a sabbatical to study new hockey techniques in Sweden. Brad Reeves took over for the 1983-84 season, in which the Mavericks finished 11–7 and failed to qualify for the national tournament for the first time since 1977.

=== Division III, II, and efforts for Division I: 1984–1996 ===
Following the 1983-84 season, the NCHA re-classified as a Division III conference, thus moving the Mavericks to Division III. The Mavericks would see some success at the Division III level, winning the NCHA conference three times and qualifying for the national tournament in five of eight seasons. The Mavs would reach the Division III Frozen Four three times, ending as national runners-up in 1991 following a 2–6 loss to UW – Stevens Point.

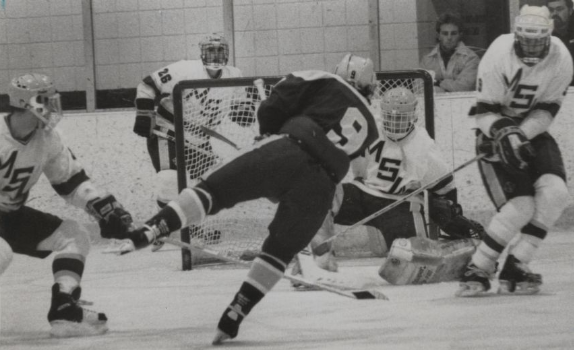
A Mavericks hockey game played in the late 1980s to early 1990s.

In the fall of 1991, funding was approved for a new civic center and arena in downtown Mankato. This arena had a much higher capacity than All Seasons Arena and would be above the capacity requirements for a Division I team. In January 1992, MSU announced its intention to move to Division I in hockey. The move was praised by students and the move seemed to be imminent after reporting from The MSU Reporter and statements from MSU President Margaret Preska, with approval a mere formality. Despite this, on September 30, 1992, the Minnesota State University Board denied Mankato State's request and unanimously voted that the school had violated the State Board as they did not look for the board's input on the move. The decision was very demoralizing for the school's leadership and its students and was widely panned, with some MSU leaders calling the decision a power move to exert control over the school, as they said the State Board was biased and did not legitimately consider the request. Not only did the decision end MSU's Division I hopes, but it also put the entire hockey program into jeopardy. By NCAA rules, Division III schools are not allowed to give out scholarships, yet, anticipating the approval to move to Division I, MSU had given out three scholarships to its hockey players for the 1992-1993 season. This meant that MSU could not compete in Division III. Without a division, MSU was forced to consider moving to Division II, which did allow scholarships, in order to keep the program going. A move to Division II was seen as a big blow to the program because, despite being a division higher, Division II was viewed as lesser than Division III in hockey due to Division II's issues with scheduling and lack of a Division II national tournament. To make matters worse, a few days later, MSU's new planned hockey arena was put into jeopardy as well, as the Mankato City Council started exploring budget cuts to the new civic center's funding which involved removing the hockey arena from the plans. Regardless, MSU had no choice other than to make the move to Division II for the upcoming season.

Without a conference in Division II, MSU opened the season as an Independent once again on October 20, 1992. The Mavs first season in Division II was disappointing, as the team played an exceptionally tough schedule, facing many Division I teams due to scheduling issues caused by a lack of Division II teams to play. The 1992-93 season would be their first losing season since 1973-74, and just their third losing season in school history. One bright spot did come after the 1992 elections when the Mankato City Council approved the addition of a hockey arena in the new civic center.

On July 17, 1995, MSU was approached by a local business group with a plan to go to move to Division I. The plan involved new details on funding and financials related to the viability of a Division I hockey team in Mankato and provided new methods for the Mavericks to generate revenue, including new hockey memberships, season ticket packages, and advertisement deals in the new Mankato Civic Center they were set to move into at the start of the 1995-1996 season. As the Minnesota State University Board had since been dissolved, the proposal was to be presented to the newly formed Minnesota State Colleges and Universities system for approval. On December 20, 1995, the proposal was approved and the Mavericks were set to join Division I starting in the 1996-97 season. The decision saw widespread praise and an outpouring of support from the community as the Mavericks saw an immediate increase in ticket sales and revenue following the announcement.

=== Ending the Don Brose Era in Division I: 1996–2000 ===
The Mavericks would open their first Division I series against Ferris State, splitting the series to earn their first Division I win with a 5-4 victory in overtime. Part of the original 1995 business plan involved a requirement for the Mavericks to join the WCHA within 1–2 years of joining Division I. After several meetings with the WCHA in 1996, the Mavericks saw interest from the WCHA, though little assurances about whether or not they would be permitted to join. The Mavericks' first season in Division I was successful, as they finished with a winning record of 17-14-3. On June 10, 1997, the Mavericks would take their first step toward joining the WCHA. Due to Northern Michigan's departure from the WCHA, the conference was left with one empty spot for their 1998 conference tournament. Due to this opening, the WCHA would offer MSU the opportunity to participate as the lowest seed in the tournament. The Mavs would end up losing the series 0-2 to North Dakota, however, they wouldn't have to wait much longer to join the conference. Following an April 1998 presentation to the WCHA by the MSU Athletics Department, the WCHA extended an offer to Mankato State, now Minnesota State University, Mankato, to join the conference beginning in the 1999-2000 season. The 1999 WCHA Tournament would be the Mavs' last game as an Independent Division I team. They would finish with a record of 50-47-14 in their three seasons as an Independent.

Their first season in the WCHA was relatively successful as they would finish with a winning record of 21-14-4. On February 14, 2000, Don Brose announced his retirement, stating that he would be ending his long tenure after the current season. The 2000 WCHA tournament would be his final games coaching in Mankato, with Brose winning WCHA Coach of the Year in his final season. Brose ended with a record of 540-363-79 in official NCAA play, good for the 7th most coaching wins of all time at his retirement, leading the Mavericks to a winning record in 24 of his 29 full seasons as the Mavs' head coach. Brose coached the Mavs to 11 national tournaments, two second place finishes, and the 1980 Division II National Championship.

=== The Troy Jutting Era: 2000–2012 ===
Following Don Brose's retirement, he immediately endorsed assistant coach Troy Jutting as his replacement. Just a few weeks later on March 27, 2000, MSU announced that they had officially hired Troy Jutting as the third head coach of the Minnesota State Mavericks hockey team.

Jutting's first two seasons as head coach were mixed, finishing with a combined 35-38-3 record and two losing records in conference play. The next season would prove to be the Mavs' most successful season in Division I up to that point. Led by Second Team All-Americans Shane Joseph and Grant Stevenson, the Mavericks finished with an overall record of 20-11-10 and a 15-6-7 record in WCHA play, with Jutting winning WCHA Coach of the Year. The Mavs beat Wisconsin in the first round of the WCHA playoffs to capture their first WCHA playoff series win and advanced to the WCHA Final Five the next week. Despite getting swept in the WCHA Final Five, the Mavericks were selected to their first Division I national tournament in program history, losing to Cornell 2-5.

Following their successful 2002-03 season, the Mavericks saw a sharp decrease in play. The 2003-04 season saw the Mavericks lose 24 games, the most losses in a season by the Mavericks to date. In the nine seasons following the 2002-03 season, the Mavericks finished with a losing record in eight of them. The 2007-08 season saw the Mavericks finish with a modest success as they ended the season fourth in the WCHA. The Mavericks would fail to win another WCHA playoff series in any of these seasons. In 2005, Grant Stevenson made his debut with the San Jose Sharks, making him the first former Maverick to play in the NHL, and the 2008 NHL Playoffs saw Ryan Carter become the first former Maverick to win a Stanley Cup. In 2010, former Maverick David Backes became the first Minnesota State player to play at the Olympics, winning a silver medal at the 2010 Winter Olympics.

After another 24 loss campaign in the 2011-12 season, the Mavericks announced their decision to remove Troy Jutting as head coach. Jutting would be re-assigned as an administrative assistant to Minnesota State University, Mankato president Richard Davenport. The university cited declining attendance as one factor for Jutting's oust, with attendance down about 1,300 spectators per game over the last three seasons and the Mavericks being the lowest attended WCHA team in the 2011-12 season. Additionally, the school stated a desire to re-invent their team with the impending conference realignment. Jutting would finish his tenure as Mavericks head coach with a record of 184-225-55 in twelve seasons. Of those twelve seasons, three of the would be winning seasons, with Jutting getting WCHA Coach of the Year honors in two of them.

=== The Mike Hastings Era: 2012–2023 ===
On April 14, 2012, the Mavericks announced that they had hired Omaha assistant coach Mike Hastings as the fourth head coach in program history. Following the announcement, the team saw a renewed interest from the public, with an increase in the number of tickets sold. As part of Hastings's hire, the school made commitments to upgrade the facilities at the Civic Center which would allow the team to house all their practices and operations at the Civic Center, rather than the outdated All-Seasons Arena. The Hastings hire would immediately prove to be a successful one, with the Mavericks finishing 24-14-3 in their first season under his direction. The team would win their First Round WCHA Tournament series, their first WCHA Tournament series win since 2003. Following this, the Mavericks qualified for their second Division I National Tournament, losing to Miami 0-4.

Following the 2012-13 season, Division I college hockey saw a large conference realignment, which left the Mavericks in the WCHA with an almost completely new slate of conference opponents. The Mavericks capitalized on this, finishing second in the WCHA and winning the WCHA tournament over Ferris State 4-1. This marked their first conference tournament championship since the 1980 Western Regional Tournament championship, and their first true conference tournament championship in team history. The Mavericks would play in the national tournament the next week, losing to UMass Lowell 1-2. The Mavericks would follow this season up with a very successful 2014-15 campaign which saw them finish 29-8-3. On January 12, 2015, the Mavericks were ranked #1 in the USCHO poll for the first time in school history. The Mavericks would claim both the WCHA regular season championship and conference tournament championship, their first time winning both in the same season. Following this, the Mavericks played in their third consecutive national tournament, this time as the overall #1 seed. Shockingly, the Mavericks would lose to RIT 1-2 in the first round, marking one of the largest upsets in Division I National Tournament history. After the 2015 season, the Mavericks gave Hastings a four-year contract extension. Hastings's first three seasons in Mankato culminated in a 79-36-7 record and a Spencer Penrose Award for him in the 2015 season.

To begin the 2015-16 season, the Mavericks unveiled their new improvements to the Mayo Clinic HSEC, including new video boards and a new hockey center and training facility attached to the building. These improvements to their facilities allowed the team to move their operations into the Mayo Clinic HSEC full-time and gave the Mavericks some of the best hockey facilities in the WCHA. Despite winning the WCHA regular season championship again in 2016, the Mavericks would fail to qualify for the national tournament in both 2016 and 2017, though in 2016, forward Matt Leitner became the first Maverick to be named a First-Team All-American. Following the 2016-17 season, the university announced that it was in negotiations to extend the contract of head coach Mike Hastings by 10 years, providing its coach with the longest contract term in all of Division I men's hockey at that point. In addition to the contract extension, the university said it would invest further resources into the program's recruiting and equipment budgets and work to increase scholarship amounts for players. The Mavericks would head back to the national tournament in 2018 following their third MacNaughton Cup win. They would fall to the Minnesota Duluth by a score of 2-3 in overtime. Following the season, Minnesota State's C. J. Suess was named as a First Team All-American.

Minnesota State took another step forward in the 2018-19 season, culminating in one of the most thrilling games in team history. Following their fourth WCHA regular season championship, the Mavericks would find themselves in the WCHA Tournament championship game against Bowling Green. With three minutes left, the Mavericks trailed 0-2 and pulled goalie Dryden McKay in a last effort to tie things up. With 1:44 left in the game, sophomore Jake Jaremko scored to cut the Falcons' lead to one. Then, one minute later with just 44 seconds left, sophomore Connor Mackey would score again to tie the game up and send the game into overtime. After less than two minutes of overtime, senior Nick Rivera buried a puck in the net to end the game and pull off one of the most improbable comebacks for MSU. The game was dubbed "The Mankato Miracle" by various local sports announcers and writers. Following this spectacular victory, the Mavericks would head to Providence to play in the national tournament as a #1 seed. Despite leading 3-0 during the game, the Mavericks would fall to #4-seeded host Providence by a score of 3-6, ending their season. This would mark the second time the #1-seeded Mavericks would lose to a #4 seed in the national tournament, thus continuing the chase for their elusive first Division I Tournament victory. The 2019-20 season would mark one of the Mavericks strongest seasons yet as they finished the season with a record of 31-5-2 and won their third consecutive MacNaughton Cup. The Mavericks were ranked as one of the top teams in the nation for most of the season and two of their players, Marc Michaelis and Dryden McKay, would be named as First Team All-Americans. Unfortunately, their campaign would be cut short after the NCAA cancelled the rest of the hockey season in early March 2020 due to the COVID-19 pandemic.

The Mavericks came back strong for the 2020-21 season. They cruised to their fourth consecutive MacNaughton Cup, though they would fall in the WCHA Conference semifinals to Lake Superior State. Despite this, the Mavericks qualified for the national tournament as a #2 seed in the Loveland Regional, where they would play Quinnipiac. With about 12 minutes left to play, the Mavericks found themselves down 1-3, and it seemed as though they would go yet another year upset by a lower seed in the tournament. Then, with a few minutes left, sophomore Nathan Smith cut the deficit to one, and with 1:02 remaining in the game and star goalie Dryden McKay on the bench, sophomore Cade Borchardt sent the game into overtime. In overtime, sophomore Ryan Sandelin slid a goal into the net to win the game for the Mavericks, finally earning them their first Division I Tournament victory. Two days later, the Mavericks would find themselves facing in-state rival #1-seeded Minnesota for a trip to the Frozen Four in Pittsburgh. The Mavericks shut out the Golden Gophers 4-0 in a game they lead nearly the entire time, thus earning themselves a trip to their first Frozen Four in school history. The Mavericks' season would come to an end the next week. Despite leading 4-3 in the 3rd period of the Frozen Four semifinals against St. Cloud, the Mavericks were unable to close out the win, letting the Huskies take the lead with 55 seconds remaining. Head coach Mike Hastings won his second Spencer Penrose Award for the Mavericks' performance. Following this season, the Mavericks, and six other teams formerly in the WCHA, began play in the Central Collegiate Hockey Association, restarting the conference after an eight-year hiatus. This move effectively marked the end for men's ice hockey in the WCHA.

The 2021-22 season would mark the Mavericks' most successful campaign to date in Division I. The Mavericks would claim their fifth consecutive conference regular season title and soon found themselves in overtime of the CCHA Tournament championship against Bemidji State. What ensued over the next 90 minutes would be dubbed as one of the most bizarre events in college hockey history. Three minutes into overtime, freshman Josh Groll scored what was believed to be the game-winning goal. Celebrations ensued as the Mavericks held a trophy presentation and skated around the ice with the Mason Cup. Meanwhile, a Bemidji State student watching the game at home noticed on a replay that the puck appeared to go into the net not through the front of the net, but rather underneath the net. If true, this would mean that the goal would not count and the game should have continued. The student sent a video of this to a friend on the team, who then showed it to Bemidji State's coach Tom Serratore in the visiting locker room. Upon seeing the video, Serratore would go back out onto the ice where the Mavericks were still celebrating to show to video to Mike Hastings and CCHA commissioner Don Lucia. The Maverick players would head back to the locker room, though shortly after Lucia called a meeting with Hastings and Serratore to inform them they would review the goal. After it was confirmed as a no-goal, the teams were informed they would need to continue playing. After 79 minutes and a trophy presentation, the CCHA Tournament championship resumed. Just over three minutes later, Minnesota State would score the true game-winning goal, ending the game for real. This series of events sent reverberations throughout the college hockey world and even led the NCAA to clarify that the game must officially end after the referees leave the ice. Following the wild Mason Cup playoffs, the Mavericks would be given a #1 seed at the Albany regional where they beat Harvard and Notre Dame 4-3 and 1-0 respectively to head to Boston to play in their second Division I Frozen Four against Minnesota. Despite trailing to the Gophers 0-1 after the first period, the Mavericks stormed back to win the game convincingly by a score of 5-1. The Mavericks would face Denver in the championship game. Despite leading 1-0 in the third period, the Mavericks would fall to the Pioneers by a score of 1-5, ending their dream season. Numerous Mavericks took home prestigious awards this season, including goaltender Dryden McKay who won the Hobey Baker and was named a First Team All-American, forward Nathan Smith who was also named a First Team All-American, and head coach Mike Hastings who won his third Spencer Penrose Award.

In the final game of the 2022-23 season, the Mavericks faced off with Michigan Tech to determine who would claim the MacNaughton Cup. With the Huskies trailing by one goal late in the game, Michigan Tech's Kyle Kukonnen scored with 1:06 remaining to tie the game and presumably send it to overtime. Should the game go into overtime, the Huskies would gain one point in the standings and automatically claim the MacNaughton Cup and the top seed in the CCHA. With 45 seconds left, Minnesota State's Andy Carroll scored the game-winner for the Mavericks to take the lead and claim their sixth consecutive MacNaughton Cup. In the CCHA Tournament championship game, the Mavericks found themselves trailing by two goals late in the game to Northern Michigan. Minnesota State pulled their goaltender in hopes of a late comeback. With 2:19 remaining, junior Ondrej Pavel tipped the puck in to cut the deficit to one. Then, with 56 seconds left, freshman Christian Fitzgerald scored again to tie the game up. The game headed into overtime where the Mavericks won in just over a minute on a goal from sophomore Zach Krajnik, claiming their second consecutive Mason Cup. The game immediately drew parallels to "The Miracle in Mankato" just four years prior which also saw the Mavericks overcome a late two goal deficit to win the conference tournament championship at home. The Mavericks would head to Fargo to play in the National Tournament where they would fall to St. Cloud by a score of 0-4. Following the season, head coach Mike Hastings announced he would be leaving Mankato to coach the Wisconsin Badgers. Following this announcement, Minnesota State's top assistant coach Todd Knott, and several Maverick players transferred to Wisconsin to follow Hastings. In all, the Mavericks saw 10 of their 26 players and all of their coaching staff leave the team following the season, throwing the future of Minnesota State hockey into question.

=== The Luke Strand Era: 2023–present ===
On April 10, 2023, the Mavericks hired Luke Strand, former Ohio State assistant coach and Sioux City Musketeers head coach, to lead the team. In his first season in Mankato, MSU finished with a record of 18-15-4. The Mavericks took a large leap forward in Strand's second season behind strong performances from junior goaltender Alex Tracy and new transfer Rhett Pitlick. The Mavericks finished as the top team in the CCHA, winning their ninth MacNaughton Cup and third Mason Cup over in-state foe St. Thomas. After a one-year hiatus, the Mavericks qualified for the Division I National Tournament once again where they fell to Western Michigan by a score of 1-2 in double overtime.

== Season-by-season results ==
Source:

== Coaches ==
As of May 24, 2025

Tenure	Coach	Years	Record	Pct.
1969–1983, 1984–2000	Don Brose	30	535–334–78	.606
1983–1984	Brad Reeves	1	16–14–0	.533
2000–2012	Troy Jutting	12	184–224–55	.457
2012–2023	Mike Hastings	11	299–109–25	.719
2023–present	Luke Strand	2	45–24–7	.638
Totals	5 coaches	56 seasons	1,079–705–165	.596

== Awards and honors ==
=== NCAA Awards and Honors ===
Individual Awards
Year	Recipient	Position
Edward Jeremiah Award
1979	Don Brose	HC
Spencer Penrose Award
2015	Mike Hastings	HC
2021	Mike Hastings	HC
2022	Mike Hastings	HC
Hobey Baker Award
2022	Dryden McKay	G

All-American Teams
Year	Recipient	Position
AHCA First Team All-American
2015-16	Matt Leitner	F
2017-18	C.J. Suess	F
2019-20	Dryden McKay	G
2019-20	Marc Michaelis	F
2021-22	Dryden McKay	G
2021-22	Nathan Smith	F
AHCA Second-Team All-American
2002-03	Shane Joseph	F
2002-03	Grant Stevenson	F
2005-06	David Backes	F
2014-15	Zach Palmquist	D
2016-17	Daniel Brickley	D
2019-20	Connor Mackey	F
2020-21	Dryden McKay	G
2022-23	Jake Livingstone	D
2024-25	Alex Tracy	G

=== Conference Awards and Honors ===
Individual Awards
Conference	Year	Recipient	Position
Player of the Year (Note: In the NCHA, this award is called the MVP Award.)
NCHA	1983	Tom Kern	F
WCHA	2018	C.J. Suess	F
WCHA	2020	Marc Michaelis	F
WCHA	2021	Dryden McKay	G
CCHA	2022	Dryden McKay	G
CCHA	2024	Sam Morton	F
CCHA	2025	Alex Tracy	G
Coach of the Year
NCHA	1987	Don Brose	HC
WCHA	2000	Don Brose	HC
WCHA	2003	Troy Jutting	HC
WCHA	2008	Troy Jutting	HC
WCHA	2013	Mike Hastings	HC
WCHA	2015	Mike Hastings	HC
WCHA	2019	Mike Hastings	HC
WCHA	2021	Mike Hastings	HC
CCHA	2022	Mike Hastings	HC
CCHA	2025	Luke Strand	HC
Forward of the Year (Note: In the WCHA, this award is called the Offensive Player of the Year.)
WCHA	2020	Marc Michaelis	F
WCHA	2021	Julian Napravnik	F
CCHA	2022	Nathan Smith	F
CCHA	2023	David Silye	F
CCHA	2024	Sam Morton	F
CCHA	2025	Rhett Pitlick	F
Defenseman of the Year (Note: In the WCHA, this award is called the Defensive Player of the Year.)
WCHA	2016	Casey Nelson	D
WCHA	2017	Daniel Brickley	D
CCHA	2022	Jake Livingstone	D
CCHA	2023	Jake Livingstone	D
CCHA	2025	Evan Murr	F
Goaltender of the Year
WCHA	2020	Dryden McKay	G
WCHA	2021	Dryden McKay	G
CCHA	2022	Dryden McKay	G
CCHA	2025	Alex Tracy	G
Rookie of the Year
WCHA	2013	Stephon Williams	G
WCHA	2017	Marc Michaelis	F
WCHA	2018	Jake Jaremko	F
WCHA	2020	Lucas Sowder	F
WCHA	2021	Akito Hirose	D
Conference Tournament MVP
WCHA	2014	Cole Huggins	G
WCHA	2015	Brad McClure	F
CCHA	2025	Evan Murr	D
Outstanding Student-Athlete of the Year
WCHA	2005	Steven Johns	D
WCHA	2008	Joel Hanson	F
WCHA	2019	Max Coatta	F
WCHA	2020	Edwin Hookenson	D
CCHA	2025	Alex Tracy	G

All-Conference Teams
Conference	Year	Recipient	Position
First Team All-Conference
NCHA	1981-82	Jim Follmer	F
NCHA	1982-83	Pat Carroll	F
NCHA	1982-83	Tom Kern	F
NCHA	1983-84	John Anderson	D
NCHA	1984-85	Mark Gustafson	D
NCHA	1984-85	Pat Carroll	F
NCHA	1985-86	Ken Hilgert	G
NCHA	1985-86	Troy Jutting	F
NCHA	1986-87	Ken Hilgert	G
NCHA	1986-87	Scott Jenewein	D
NCHA	1987-88	Dan Horn	D
NCHA	1989-90	Terry Hughes	D
NCHA	1990-91	Glen Prodahl	G
NCHA	1991-92	Brian Langlot	G
NCHA	1991-92	Tim Potter	D
WCHA	2002-03	Shane Joseph	F
WCHA	2002-03	Grant Stevenson	F
WCHA	2012-13	Stephon Williams	G
WCHA	2013-14	Zach Palmquist	D
WCHA	2013-14	Matt Leitner	F
WCHA	2014-15	Zach Palmquist	D
WCHA	2014-15	Matt Leitner	F
WCHA	2015-16	Casey Nelson	D
WCHA	2015-16	Teodors Bļugers	F
WCHA	2016-17	Daniel Brickley	D
WCHA	2016-17	Marc Michaelis	F
WCHA	2017-18	C.J. Suess	F
WCHA	2017-18	Marc Michaelis	F
WCHA	2018-19	Marc Michaelis	F
WCHA	2019-20	Dryden McKay	G
WCHA	2019-20	Connor Mackey	D
WCHA	2019-20	Marc Michaelis	F
WCHA	2020-21	Dryden McKay	G
WCHA	2020-21	Julian Napravnik	F
CCHA	2021-22	Dryden McKay	G
CCHA	2021-22	Jake Livingstone	D
CCHA	2021-22	Nathan Smith	F
CCHA	2021-22	Julian Napravnik	F
CCHA	2022-23	Jake Livingstone	D
CCHA	2022-23	David Silye	F
CCHA	2023-24	Sam Morton	F
CCHA	2024-25	Alex Tracy	G
CCHA	2024-25	Evan Murr	D
CCHA	2024-25	Rhett Pitlick	F
Second Team All-Conference
NCHA	1981-82	John Anderson	D
NCHA	1981-82	Tom Kern	F
NCHA	1982-83	Mike Hill	D
WCHA	2005-06	David Backes	F
WCHA	2006-07	Travis Morin	F
WCHA	2013-14	Cole Huggins	G
WCHA	2013-14	Jean-Paul Lafontaine	F
WCHA	2014-15	Stephon Williams	G
WCHA	2014-15	Casey Nelson	D
WCHA	2014-15	Bryce Gervais	F
WCHA	2016-17	C.J. Franklin	F
WCHA	2017-18	Daniel Brickley	D
WCHA	2018-19	Dryden McKay	G
WCHA	2018-19	Parker Tuomie	F
WCHA	2019-20	Parker Tuomie	F
WCHA	2020-21	Nathan Smith	F
CCHA	2022-23	Akito Hirose	D
CCHA	2023-24	Evan Murr	D
Third Team All-Conference
WCHA	1999-00	Aaron Fox	F
WCHA	2000-01	Ben Christopherson	D
WCHA	2003-04	Shane Joseph	F
WCHA	2004-05	David Backes	F
WCHA	2006-07	Steve Wagner	D
WCHA	2008-09	Kurt Davis	D
WCHA	2010-11	Kurt Davis	D
WCHA	2012-13	Matt Leitner	F
WCHA	2012-13	Eriah Hayes	F
WCHA	2013-14	Johnny McInnis	F
WCHA	2013-14	Zach Lehrke	F
WCHA	2015-16	Bryce Gervais	F
WCHA	2016-17	Brad McClure	D
WCHA	2017-18	Connor LaCouvee	G
WCHA	2017-18	Ian Scheid	D
WCHA	2017-18	Zeb Knutson	F
WCHA	2018-19	Connor Mackey	D
WCHA	2018-19	Ian Scheid	D
WCHA	2019-20	Ian Scheid	D
WCHA	2020-21	Akito Hirose	D
WCHA	2020-21	Riese Zmolek	D
Conference All-Rookie Team
WCHA	2003-04	David Backes	F
WCHA	2005-06	Dan Tormey	G
WCHA	2011-12	Jean-Paul Lafontaine	F
WCHA	2012-13	Stephon Williams	G
WCHA	2013-14	Cole Huggins	G
WCHA	2013-14	Sean Flanagan	D
WCHA	2014-15	C.J. Franklin	F
WCHA	2015-16	Daniel Brickley	D
WCHA	2015-16	Max Coatta	F
WCHA	2016-17	Ian Scheid	D
WCHA	2016-17	Marc Michaelis	F
WCHA	2017-18	Connor Mackey	D
WCHA	2017-18	Jake Jaremko	F
WCHA	2017-18	Reggie Lutz	F
WCHA	2018-19	Dryden McKay	G
WCHA	2018-19	Ashton Calder	F
WCHA	2018-19	Julian Napravnik	F
WCHA	2019-20	Lucas Sowder	F
WCHA	2019-20	Nathan Smith	F
WCHA	2020-21	Akito Hirose	D
WCHA	2020-21	Jake Livingstone	D
CCHA	2021-22	Bennett Zmolek	D
CCHA	2023-24	Evan Murr	D

== Statistical leaders ==
=== Career points leaders ===
Player	Years	GP	G	A	Pts	PIM
Tom Kern	1979–1983	144	129	110	239	90
Pat Carroll	1981–1985	132	123	101	224	175
Steve Forliti	1977–1981	136	83	113	196	83
John Passolt	1979–1982	106	68	105	173	94
Ryan Rintoul	1994–1998	128	55	114	169	202
Jon Hill	1981–1985	133	63	105	168	178
Greg Larson	1977–1981	147	76	92	168	142
Tyler Deis	1995–1999	130	90	74	164	309
Aaron Fox	1996–2000	147	61	103	164	68
Matt Leitner	2011–2015	158	49	113	162	114
Marc Michaelis	2016–2020	148	71	91	162	65

=== Career goaltending leaders ===
GP = Games played; Min = Minutes played; W = Wins; L = Losses; T = Ties; GA = Goals against; SO = Shutouts; SV% = Save percentage; GAA = Goals against average

Minimum 30 games

Player	Years	GP	Min	W	L	T	GA	SO	SV%	GAA
Dryden McKay	2018–2022	140	8250	113	20	4	201	34	.932	1.46
Connor LaCouvee	2017–2018	31	1800	23	6	1	54	3	.914	1.86
Cole Huggins	2013–2017	88	4730	46	27	4	158	11	.914	2.00
Stephon Williams	2012–2015	82	4636	51	24	5	155	10	.917	2.01
Jason Pawloski	2015–2018	45	2468	22	11	7	87	5	.907	2.12

Statistics current through the start of the 2021-22 season.

== Current roster ==
As of August 24, 2024.

No.	Nat.	Player	Class	Pos	Height	Weight	DoB	Hometown	Previous team	NHL rights
4	(United States)	Jacob Conrad	Sophomore (RS)	D	5' 11" (1.8 m)	180 lb (82 kg)	2002-05-18	Green Bay, Wisconsin	Lake Superior State (CCHA)	—
5	(United States)	Mason Wheeler	Junior	D	6' 1" (1.85 m)	195 lb (88 kg)	2001-09-29	Inver Grove Heights, Minnesota	Tri-City Storm (USHL)	—
7	(United States)	Bryce Strand	Freshman	D	5' 9" (1.75 m)	165 lb (75 kg)	2004-02-10	Green Bay, Wisconsin	Philadelphia Rebels (NAHL)	—
8	(United States)	Campbell Cichosz	Senior	D	6' 0" (1.83 m)	174 lb (79 kg)	2001-08-23	Albert Lea, Minnesota	Anchorage Wolverines (NAHL)	—
9	(Canada)	Luigi Benincasa	Junior	F	5' 9" (1.75 m)	159 lb (72 kg)	2002-10-07	Edmonton, Alberta	Ferris State (CCHA)	—
10	(United States)	Evan Murr	Junior	D	5' 10" (1.78 m)	178 lb (81 kg)	2003-02-27	Stillwater, Minnesota	Sioux Falls Stampede (USHL)	—
11	(United States)	Jordan Ronn	Freshman	F	6' 10" (2.08 m)	176 lb (80 kg)	2005-06-09	Champlin, Minnesota	Fargo Force (USHL)	—
12	(Sweden)	Alex Zetterberg	Sophomore	F	5' 8" (1.73 m)	163 lb (74 kg)	2006-04-27	Sundsvall, Sweden	Boston University (HEA)	—
13	(Canada)	Tristan Lemyre	Senior	F	5' 10" (1.78 m)	170 lb (77 kg)	2001-01-15	Mirabel, Quebec	Western Michigan (NCHC)	—
14	(United States)	Mason LeBel	Freshman	F	6' 3" (1.91 m)	194 lb (88 kg)	2004-05-06	South Bend, Indiana	St. Cloud Norsemen (NAHL)	—
16	(Canada)	Jacob Bonkowski	Freshman	F	6' 1" (1.85 m)	170 lb (77 kg)	2003-08-25	Richmond, British Columbia	Coquitlam Express (BCHL)	—
17	(United States)	Ean Somoza	Junior	F	6' 3" (1.91 m)	188 lb (85 kg)	2003-02-08	Thousand Oaks, California	Western Michigan (NCHC)	—
18	(United States)	Jakob Stender	Junior	F	5' 11" (1.8 m)	185 lb (84 kg)	2002-08-07	Alexandria, Minnesota	Fargo Force (USHL)	—
20	(United States)	Jack Smith	Senior	F	6' 0" (1.83 m)	190 lb (86 kg)	2002-07-06	St. Cloud, Minnesota	Minnesota Duluth (NCHC)	MTL, 102nd overall 2020
21	(Canada)	Fin Williams	Junior	F	6' 1" (1.85 m)	186 lb (84 kg)	2003-04-21	North Vancouver, British Columbia	Notre Dame (Big Ten)	—
22	(Canada)	Liam Hupka	Freshman	D	6' 3" (1.91 m)	190 lb (86 kg)	2005-06-27	Minneapolis, Minnesota	Sioux City Musketeers (USHL)	—
23	(United States)	Sawyer Scholl	Junior	F	6' 2" (1.88 m)	190 lb (86 kg)	2002-02-14	Medford, Wisconsin	Wisconsin (Big Ten)	—
24	(United States)	Charlie Lurie	Junior	F	5' 11" (1.8 m)	187 lb (85 kg)	2003-03-11	Minnetonka, Minnesota	Omaha (NCHC)	—
25	(Latvia)	Fēlikss Gavars	Senior	F	5' 11" (1.8 m)	184 lb (83 kg)	2002-05-15	Riga, Latvia	St. Lawrence (ECAC)	—
26	(Canada)	Rylan Bonkowski	Freshman	D	5' 11" (1.8 m)	170 lb (77 kg)	2006-04-26	Richmond, British Columbia	Tri-City Storm (USHL)	—
27	(Canada)	Liam Watkins	Sophomore	F	6' 1" (1.85 m)	201 lb (91 kg)	2004-07-13	Okotoks, Alberta	Omaha (NCHC)	—
28	(United States)	Easton Hewson	Freshman	D	6' 4" (1.93 m)	220 lb (100 kg)	2005-06-08	Edmonton, Alberta	Waterloo Black Hawks (USHL)	—
31	(United States)	Matthew Syverson	Junior	G	6' 4" (1.93 m)	185 lb (84 kg)	2003-04-22	Apple Valley, Minnesota	Lindenwood (NCAA)	—
33	(United States)	Alex Tracy	Senior	G	6' 0" (1.83 m)	187 lb (85 kg)	2001-05-04	Chicago, Illinois	Sioux City Musketeers (USHL)	—
35	(Canada)	Max Beckford	Sophomore	G	6' 2" (1.88 m)	205 lb (93 kg)	2003-01-30	London, Ontario	Bentley (AHA)	—
39	(Latvia)	Ralfs Bergmanis	Senior	D	5' 10" (1.78 m)	175 lb (79 kg)	2002-03-13	Liepāja, Latvia	Vermont (HEA)	—
44	(United States)	Reid Morich	Freshman	F	6' 2" (1.88 m)	214 lb (97 kg)	2005-04-11	Scottsdale, Arizona	Waterloo Black Hawks (USHL)	—

== Olympians ==
This is a list of Minnesota State alumni were a part of an Olympic team.

Name	Position	Minnesota State Tenure	Team	Year	Finish
David Backes	Center/Right Wing	2003–2006	(United States) USA	2010, 2014	Silver, 4th
Nathan Smith	Center	2019–2022	(United States) USA	2022	5th
Marc Michaelis	Left Wing	2016–2020	(Germany) GER	2026	6th
Parker Tuomie	Right Wing	2016–2020	(Germany) GER	2026	6th
Teddy Blueger	Center	2012–2016	(Latvia) LAT	2026	10th

== Mavericks in the NHL ==
As of July 1, 2025

= NHL All-Star team	= NHL All-Star	= NHL All-Star and NHL All-Star team	= Hall of Famers

Player	Position	Team(s)	Years	Games	Stanley Cups
Wyatt Aamodt	Defenseman	COL	2024–Present	2	1
David Backes	Right wing	STL, BOS, ANA	2006–2021	965	0
Teodors Bļugers	Center	PIT, VGK, VAN	2018–Present	418	1
Daniel Brickley	Defenseman	LAK	2017–2019	5	0
Ryan Carter	Left wing	ANA, CAR, FLA, NJD, MIN	2006–2016	473	1
Walker Duehr	Right wing	CGY, SJS	2021–Present	92	0
Eriah Hayes	Right wing	SJS	2013–2015	19	0
Akito Hirose	Defenseman	VAN	2022–2024	10	0
Tim Jackman	Right wing	CBJ, PHO, NYI, CGY, ANA	2003–2016	483	0
Jon Kalinski	Center	PHI	2008–2010	22	0
Jake Livingstone	Defenseman	NSH	2022–2023	5	0
Connor Mackey	Defenseman	CGY, ARI, NYR	2020–Present	42	0

Player	Position	Team(s)	Years	Games	Stanley Cups
Marc Michaelis	Left wing	VAN	2020–2021	15	0
Travis Morin	Center	DAL	2011–2015	13	0
Sam Morton	Defenseman	CGY	2024–Present	1	0
Kael Mouillierat	Left wing	NYI, PIT	2014–2016	7	0
Casey Nelson	Defenseman	BUF	2015–2019	93	0
Ondřej Pavel	Center	COL	2023–2024	2	0
Tyler Pitlick	Center	EDM, DAL, PHI, ARI, CGY, MTL, STL, NYR	2013–2024	420	0
Nathan Smith	Center	ARI	2021–2023	14	0
Jaxson Stauber	Goaltender	CHI, UTA	2022–Present	12	0
Grant Stevenson	Right wing	SJS	2005–2006	47	0
C. J. Suess	Left wing	WIN, SJS	2019–2023	5	0
Steve Wagner	Defenseman	STL	2007–2009	46	0

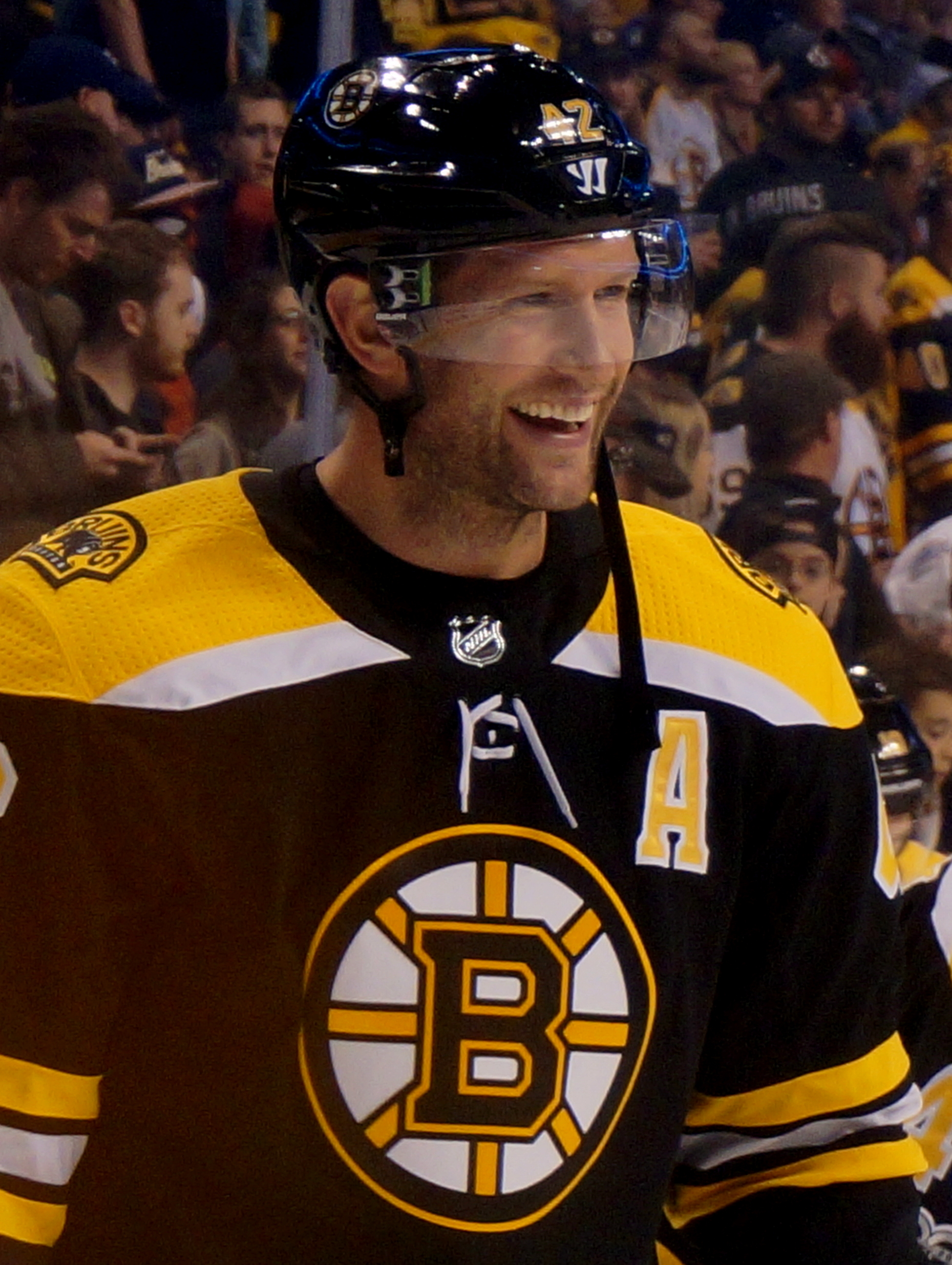
David Backes

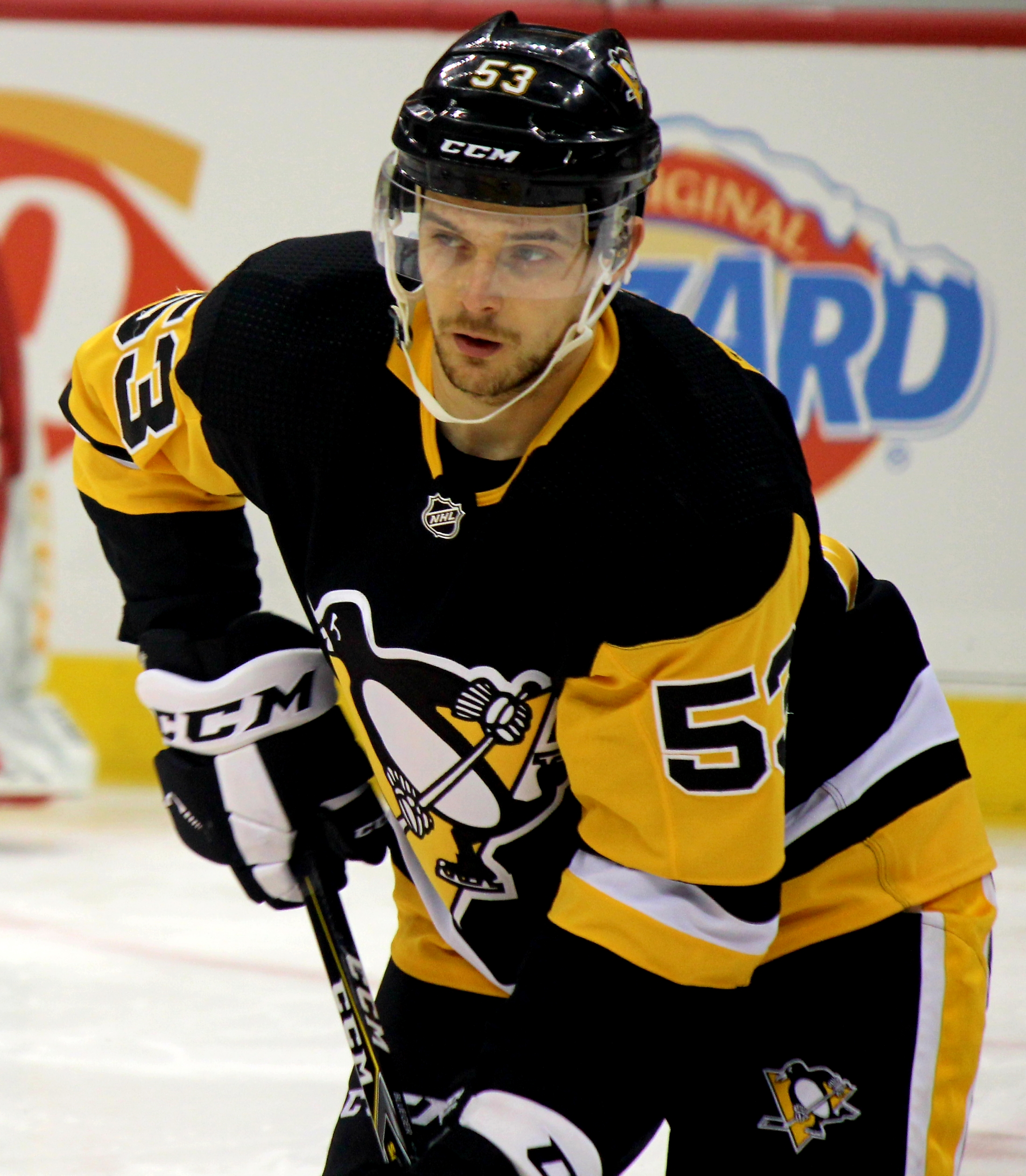
Teodors Bļugers

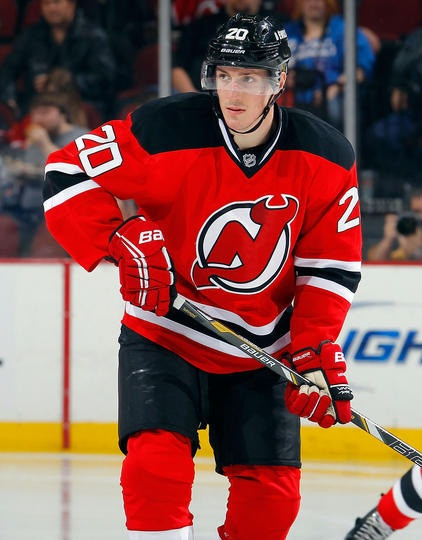
Ryan Carter

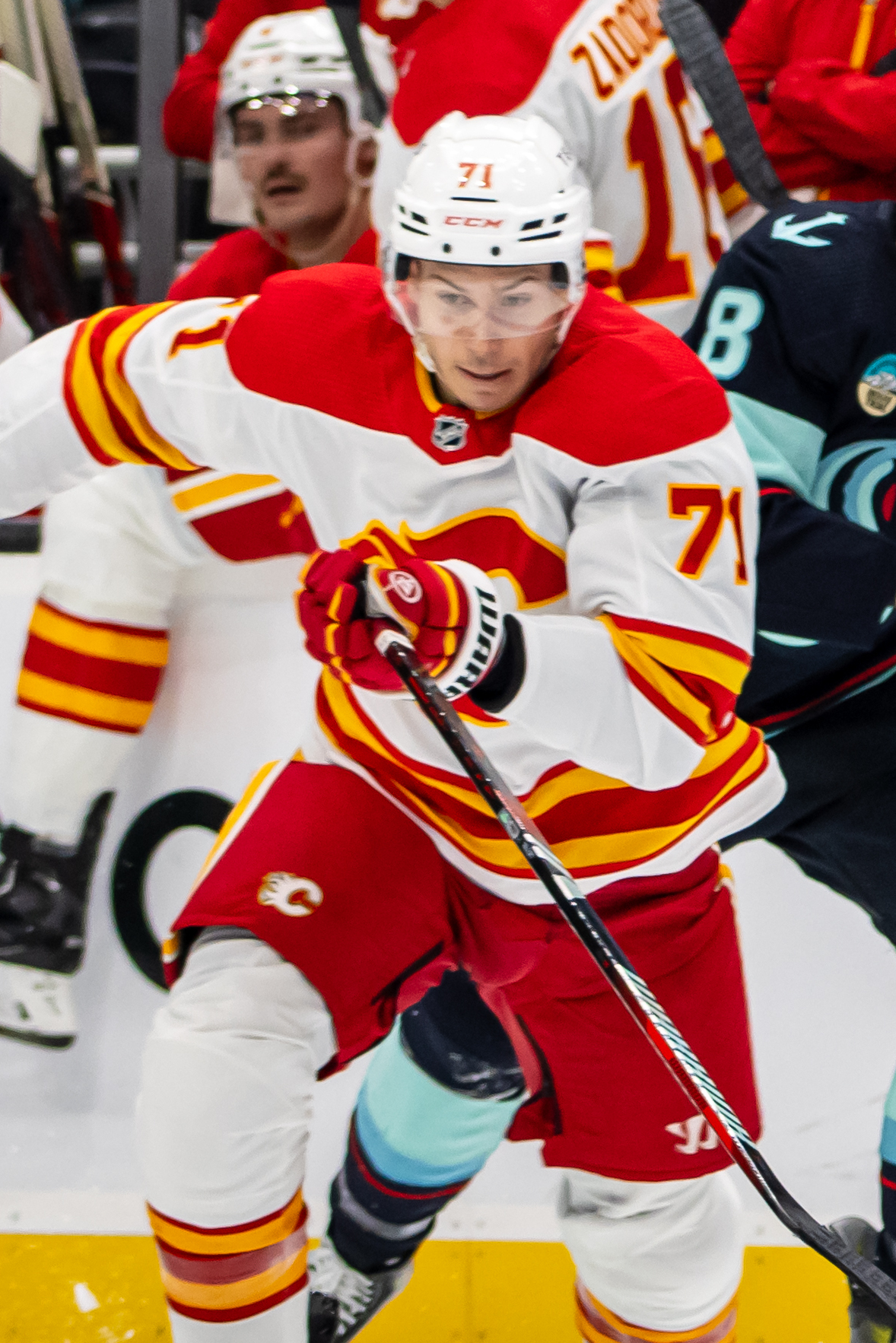
Walker Duehr

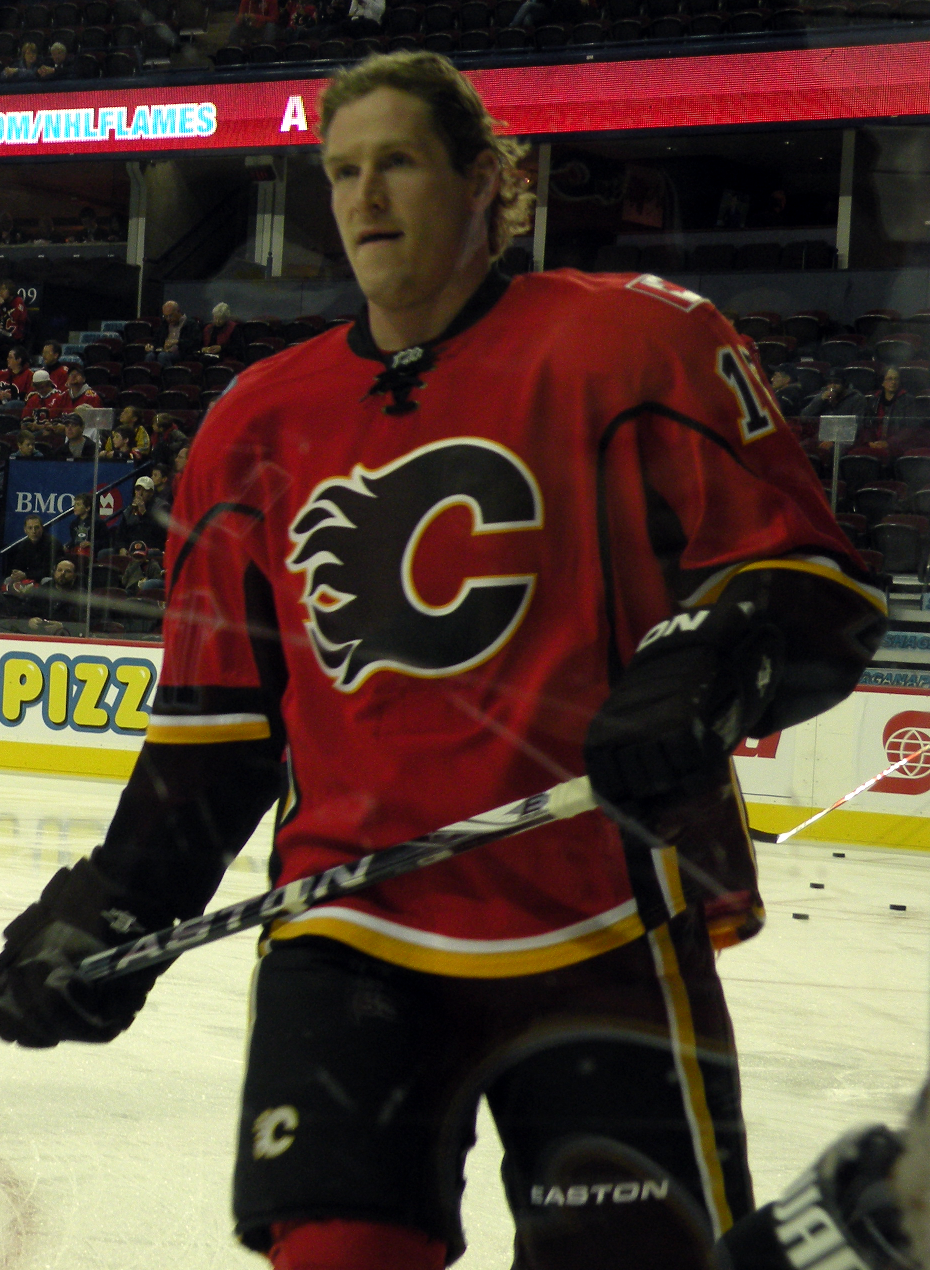
Tim Jackman

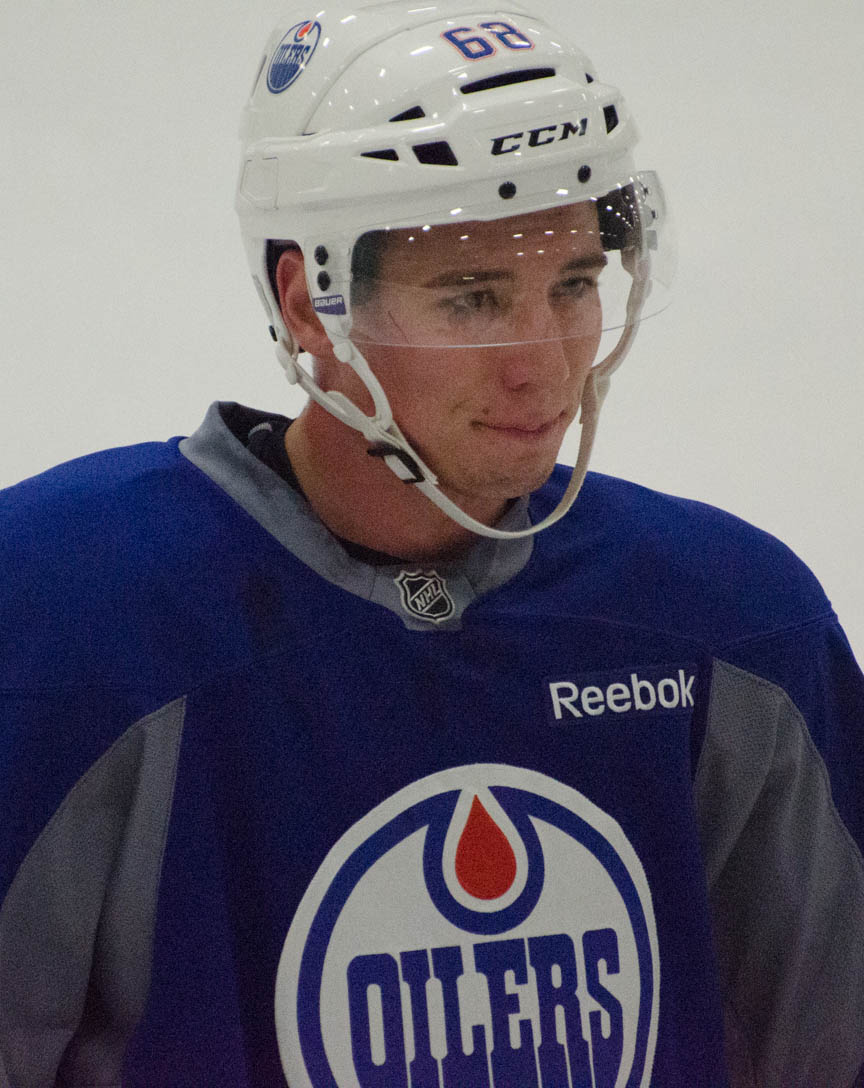
Tyler Pitlick

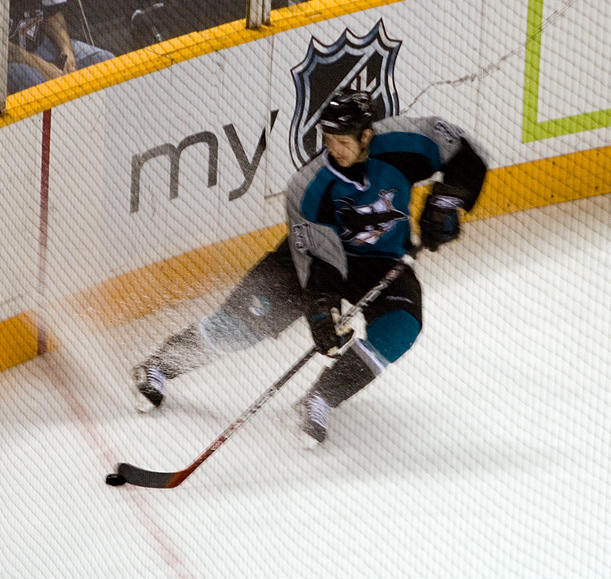
Grant Stevenson

== See also ==
- Minnesota State Mavericks women's ice hockey
