= Casey Nelson =

American ice hockey player (born 1992)

- Born: July 18, 1992 (age 34) Stillwater, Minnesota, U.S.
- Height: 6 ft 2 in (188 cm)
- Weight: 182 lb (83 kg; 13 st 0 lb)
- Position: Defense
- Shot: Right
- Played for: Buffalo Sabres
- NHL draft: Undrafted
- Playing career: 2016–2021

Casey Nelson (born July 18, 1992) is an American former professional ice hockey defenseman, who played in parts of four seasons with the Buffalo Sabres of the National Hockey League (NHL).

== Playing career ==
=== High school ===
Nelson played in the Wisconsin Interscholastic Athletic Association for the Wisconsin Rapids Lincoln High School Red Raiders at the SWCRC (South Wood County Recreation Center) in Wisconsin Rapids, Wisconsin US.

=== Amateur ===
Nelson played in the North American Hockey League with the Alaska Avalanche and Johnstown Tomahawks. He was named the NAHL Defenseman of the Month for November 2012, and he played in the 2013 NAHL Top Prospects Tournament.

Nelson joined the NCAA's Minnesota State Mavericks in 2013 and played three seasons at the school. He was named to the All-WCHA Second Team in the 2014–15 season. In the 2015–16 season, he was named the conference's Defensive Player of the Year while being named to the All-WCHA First Team.

Nelson played alongside his brother, Josh, for the 2013–14 season.

=== Professional ===
Nelson was invited to participate in a prospect camp for the National Hockey League's Philadelphia Flyers in the summer of 2015.

Nelson was signed to an entry-level professional contract by the NHL's Buffalo Sabres on March 22, 2016. He made his NHL debut with the team on March 26, tallying his first NHL point on an assist in the first period of a game against the Winnipeg Jets.

On June 29, 2016, Nelson signed a two-year contract extension with the Sabres. He recorded his first NHL goal on February 11, 2018, in a 5–4 loss to the Colorado Avalanche. On May 2, 2018, Nelson re-signed with the Sabres.

As a free agent, Nelson initially returned for a sixth season within the Sabres organization by agreeing to a one-year, two-way contract extension on October 22, 2020. However, Nelson later opted out of participating of the delayed 2020–21 season due to the ongoing COVID-19 pandemic.

On January 15, 2021, Nelson announced through Instagram that he was retiring from hockey after five professional seasons.

== Personal ==
A native of Wisconsin Rapids, Wisconsin, Nelson was a member of a state tournament attending hockey team at Lincoln High School. His older brother Josh currently coaches the Muskegon Lumberjacks in the USHL.

== Career statistics ==
			Regular season					Playoffs
Season	Team	League	GP	G	A	Pts	PIM	GP	G	A	Pts	PIM
2010–11	Alaska Avalanche	NAHL	29	1	5	6	8	—	—	—	—	—
2011–12	Alaska Avalanche	NAHL	56	1	19	20	14	5	0	0	0	0
2012–13	Johnstown Tomahawks	NAHL	56	10	22	32	42	2	0	0	0	0
2013–14	Minnesota State	WCHA	19	1	4	5	6	—	—	—	—	—
2014–15	Minnesota State	WCHA	40	7	26	33	16	—	—	—	—	—
2015–16	Minnesota State	WCHA	40	6	16	22	22	—	—	—	—	—
2015–16	Buffalo Sabres	NHL	7	0	4	4	8	—	—	—	—	—
2016–17	Buffalo Sabres	NHL	11	0	0	0	4	—	—	—	—	—
2016–17	Rochester Americans	AHL	58	7	14	21	24	—	—	—	—	—
2017–18	Rochester Americans	AHL	40	2	9	11	16	1	0	0	0	0
2017–18	Buffalo Sabres	NHL	37	3	5	8	8	—	—	—	—	—
2018–19	Buffalo Sabres	NHL	38	1	5	6	13	—	—	—	—	—
2018–19	Rochester Americans	AHL	5	0	1	1	4	—	—	—	—	—
2019–20	Rochester Americans	AHL	48	4	8	12	10	—	—	—	—	—
NHL totals			93	4	14	18	33	—	—	—	—	—

== Awards and honors ==
Award	Year
All-WCHA First Team	2015–16

Awards and achievements
Preceded by Colton Parayko	WCHA Defensive Player of the Year; 2015–16	Succeeded by Daniel Brickley
