= Zach Palmquist =

American ice hockey player

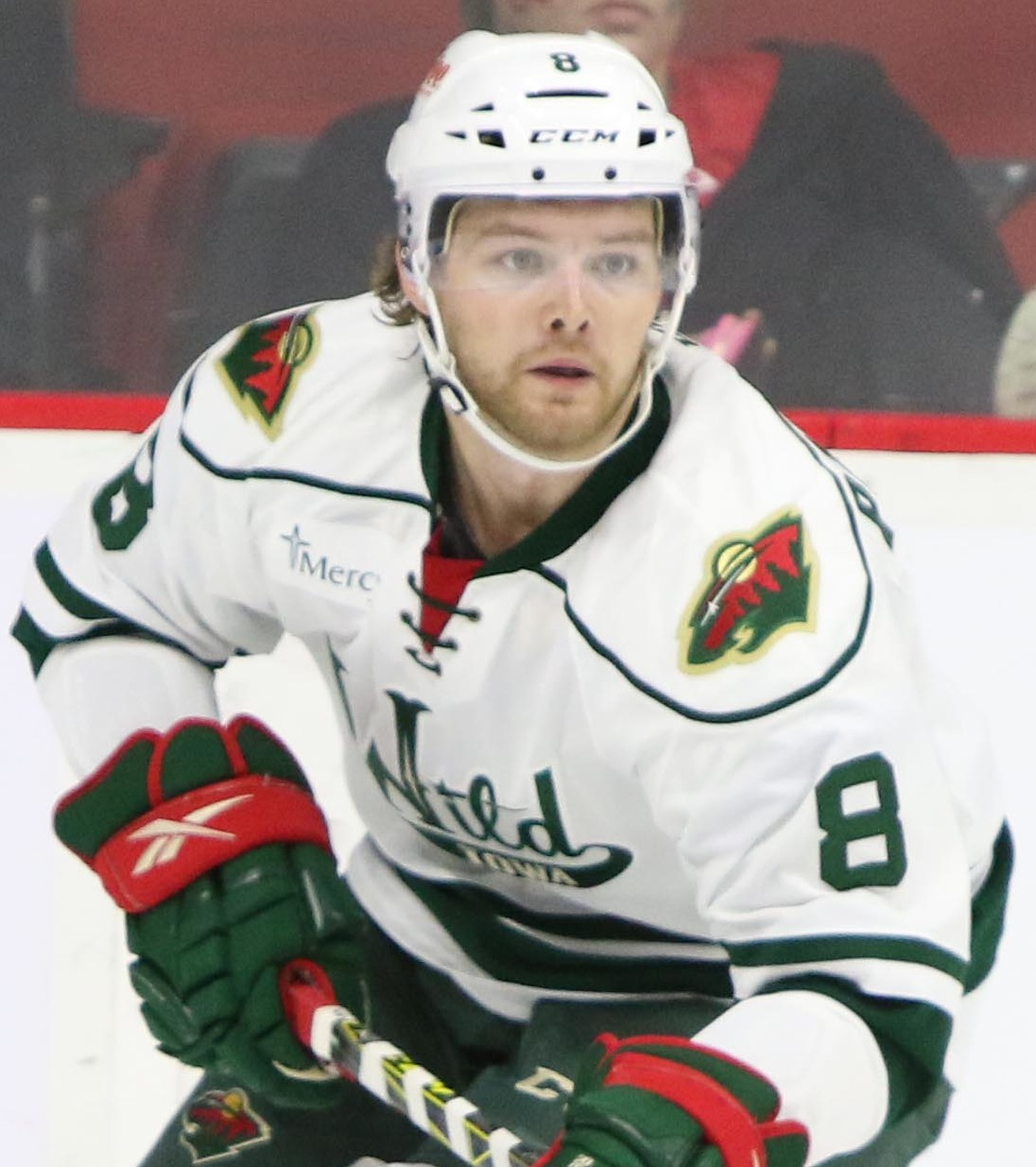
- Palmquist with the Iowa Wild in 2015
- Born: December 9, 1990 (age 35) South St. Paul, Minnesota, U.S.
- Height: 6 ft 0 in (183 cm)
- Weight: 175 lb (79 kg; 12 st 7 lb)
- Position: Defense
- Shoots: Left
- Current team Former teams: IF Björklöven; Iowa Wild; Lehigh Valley Phantoms
- NHL draft: Undrafted
- Playing career: 2015–present

Zach Palmquist (born December 9, 1990) is an American professional ice hockey defenseman who is currently a free agent. He previously played for the Lehigh Valley Phantoms of the American Hockey League (AHL).

== Playing career ==
Previously, he played four years at the collegiate level for the Minnesota State Mavericks in the NCAA Men's Division I Western Collegiate Hockey Association (WCHA). Palmquist's outstanding play was rewarded with a selection to the All-WCHA First Team in both the 2013–14 and 2014–15 seasons.

On March 30, 2015, Palmquist signed as an undrafted free agent to a one-year entry-level contract with home state NHL team, the Minnesota Wild.

Palmquist played four seasons within Minnesota's AHL affiliate, the Iowa Wild, before leaving as a free agent following the 2017–18 campaign. On August 31, 2018, he agreed to continue in the AHL by securing a one-year deal with the Lehigh Valley Phantoms, the primary affiliate to the Philadelphia Flyers.

== Career statistics ==
			Regular season					Playoffs
Season	Team	League	GP	G	A	Pts	PIM	GP	G	A	Pts	PIM
2007–08	South St. Paul High	USHS	5	3	5	8	0	—	—	—	—	—
2008–09	South St. Paul High	USHS	25	14	24	38	32	—	—	—	—	—
2008–09	Waterloo Black Hawks	USHL	12	0	3	3	18	2	0	0	0	2
2009–10	Waterloo Black Hawks	USHL	53	9	27	36	60	3	0	0	0	0
2010–11	Waterloo Black Hawks	USHL	59	4	14	18	67	2	0	1	1	0
2011–12	Minnesota State U - Mankato	WCHA	38	6	13	19	31	—	—	—	—	—
2012–13	Minnesota State U - Mankato	WCHA	41	7	18	25	20	—	—	—	—	—
2013–14	Minnesota State U - Mankato	WCHA	41	4	19	23	36	—	—	—	—	—
2014–15	Minnesota State U - Mankato	WCHA	40	8	21	29	20	—	—	—	—	—
2014–15	Iowa Wild	AHL	8	0	3	3	4	—	—	—	—	—
2015–16	Iowa Wild	AHL	69	4	7	11	26	—	—	—	—	—
2016–17	Iowa Wild	AHL	72	2	19	21	20	—	—	—	—	—
2017–18	Iowa Wild	AHL	67	6	28	34	42	—	—	—	—	—
2018–19	Lehigh Valley Phantoms	AHL	66	3	11	14	24	—	—	—	—	—
AHL totals			282	15	68	83	116	—	—	—	—	—

== Awards and honors ==
Award	Year
College
All-WCHA First Team	2013–14
All-WCHA First Team	2014–15
