= Eriah Hayes =

American ice hockey player (born 1988)

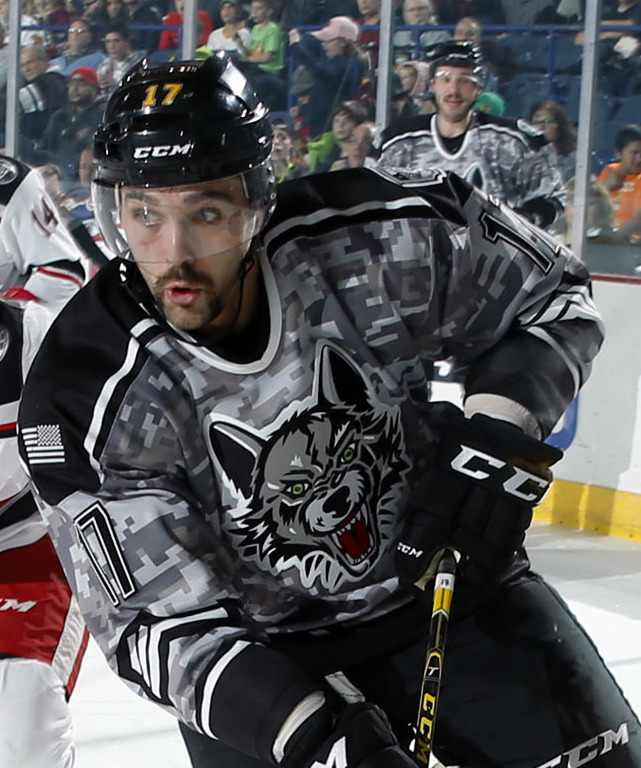
- Hayes with the Chicago Wolves in 2015
- Born: July 7, 1988 (age 38) La Crescent, Minnesota, U.S.
- Height: 6 ft 4 in (193 cm)
- Weight: 209 lb (95 kg; 14 st 13 lb)
- Position: Right wing
- Shot: Right
- Played for: San Jose Sharks
- NHL draft: Undrafted
- Playing career: 2013–2017

Eriah Joseph Hayes (born July 7, 1988) is an American former professional ice hockey player. He played in the National Hockey League (NHL) with the San Jose Sharks.

== Playing career ==
He played junior hockey with the Waterloo Blackhawks. Hayes attended Minnesota State University, Mankato where he played four seasons (2009–2013) of NCAA Division I hockey with the Minnesota State Mavericks, registering 52 goals, 44 assists, 96 points, and 245 penalty minutes in 153 games.

On April 5, 2013, the San Jose Sharks signed Hayes as a free agent to an NHL entry-level contract. On January 3, 2014, after playing 36 AHL games, Hayes was recalled from the Worcester Sharks to join San Jose; however, a winter storm prevented him from joining the NHL team in time for the January 4, 2014 match against the Colorado Avalanche, but he was on the ice with San Jose on January 6, 2014, to make his NHL debut in a 3–2 shootout win over the home team Chicago Blackhawks. On January 30 against the Calgary Flames, Hayes scored his first NHL goal against Karri Ramo.

On October 11, 2014, Sharks General Manager Doug Wilson announced that Hayes has been reassigned to Worcester.

On August 13, 2015, Hayes signed as a free agent a one-year contract with the Chicago Wolves of the AHL.

On October 3, 2017, he announced on his Twitter account that he retired from hockey.

== Career statistics ==
| | | | Regular season | | | | | Playoffs |
| Season | Team | League | GP | G | A | Pts | PIM | GP | G | A | Pts | PIM |
|---|---|---|---|---|---|---|---|---|---|---|---|---|
| 2007–08 | Topeka Roadrunners | NAHL | 53 | 30 | 26 | 56 | 61 | 12 | 5 | 5 | 10 | 6 |
| 2008–09 | Waterloo Black Hawks | USHL | 59 | 27 | 18 | 45 | 81 | 3 | 1 | 0 | 1 | 4 |
| 2009–10 | Minnesota State U. (Mankato) | WCHA | 38 | 8 | 6 | 14 | 59 | — | — | — | — | — |
| 2010–11 | Minnesota State U. (Mankato) | WCHA | 38 | 11 | 11 | 22 | 52 | — | — | — | — | — |
| 2011–12 | Minnesota State U. (Mankato) | WCHA | 36 | 13 | 11 | 24 | 83 | — | — | — | — | — |
| 2012–13 | Minnesota State U. (Mankato) | WCHA | 41 | 20 | 16 | 36 | 51 | — | — | — | — | — |
| 2012–13 | Worcester Sharks | AHL | 7 | 3 | 1 | 4 | 4 | — | — | — | — | — |
| 2013–14 | Worcester Sharks | AHL | 59 | 12 | 9 | 21 | 43 | — | — | — | — | — |
| 2013–14 | San Jose Sharks | NHL | 15 | 1 | 0 | 1 | 2 | — | — | — | — | — |
| 2014–15 | Worcester Sharks | AHL | 59 | 8 | 17 | 25 | 40 | 4 | 1 | 2 | 3 | 0 |
| 2014–15 | San Jose Sharks | NHL | 4 | 0 | 0 | 0 | 2 | — | — | — | — | — |
| 2015–16 | Chicago Wolves | AHL | 39 | 6 | 5 | 11 | 43 | — | — | — | — | — |
| NHL totals | | | 19 | 1 | 0 | 1 | 4 | — | — | — | — | — |

== Awards and honors ==
| Award | Year |
|---|---|
| All-WCHA Third Team | 2012–13 |
