= Grant Stevenson =

Canadian ice hockey player

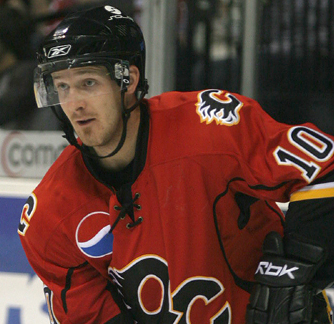
- Stevenson with the Quad City Flames during the 2007-08 season
- Born: October 15, 1981 (age 44) Spruce Grove, Alberta, Canada
- Height: 6 ft 1 in (185 cm)
- Weight: 175 lb (79 kg; 12 st 7 lb)
- Position: Right wing
- Shot: Right
- Played for: San Jose Sharks
- NHL draft: Undrafted
- Playing career: 2003–2011

Grant Thomas Stevenson (born October 15, 1981) is a Canadian former professional ice hockey forward who played in the National Hockey League (NHL) with the San Jose Sharks during the 2005–06 season.

== Playing career ==
Stevenson was born in Spruce Grove, Alberta. After winning the "player of the year" award with the Spruce Grove Midget AAA team, Stevenson joined the Bonnyville Pontiacs of the Alberta Junior Hockey League (AJHL) for the 1999–00 season. He recorded 20 and 38 assists in 63 games in his rookie season and was his team's "rookie of the year". He also played in the AJHL Prospects Game. In 2000–01, Stevenson played for the Grande Prairie Storm of the AJHL and improved on his totals with 22 goals and 67 assists in 62 games, and he played in the AJHL All-Star game.

Recruited by Minnesota State University, Mankato for the 2001–02 season, Stevenson finished 8th in WCHA Rookie Scoring with 8 goals and 8 assists in 38 games, winning "rookie of the week" twice. Breaking out next year as the highest scoring sophomore in the nation with 27 goals and 36 assists in 38 games, Stevenson was second on the team and 5th in the nation in scoring. Consequently, Stevenson garnered many weekly honors and was named to the WCHA First All-Star Team.

Leaving college two years early, Stevenson signed with San Jose Sharks as a free agent on April 18, 2003.

In 2003–04, his first pro season, Stevenson posted 39 (13 + 26) points in 71 games for the Cleveland Barons, and also recorded seven assists in nine playoff games. Playing with former Minnesota State Mavericks teammate Shane Joseph signed to a PTO contract March 15, Stevenson garnered five goals and 11 assists in 14 games. Stevenson's powerful chemistry with Joseph helped earn him a contract with the Barons' NHL team, the San Jose Sharks. Stevenson, however, failed to make significant progress the following season; playing poorly for the Barons, Stevenson was demoted to the Johnstown Chiefs of the ECHL, where he finished the 2004–05 season with 14 goals, and 25 assists in 77 games.

Following his "sophomore slump," Stevenson worked out hard in the summer to gain more strength and speed. His efforts seemed to pay off, as he rebounded with 16 points in 17 games for the Barons in 2005–06 before being called up to San Jose on November 23, 2005. Stevenson finished his first NHL season with 10 goals and 12 assists in 47 games. Despite his decent stats as an NHL rookie, Stevenson did not play an NHL game the following season, partly due to the emergence of other young San Jose forwards.

On July 4, 2007, Stevenson signed with the Calgary Flames as a free agent. He spent the year with the Flames affiliate the Quad City Flames of the AHL. On July 9, 2008, Stevenson was again on the move signing for the Atlanta Thrashers as a free agent.

For the season 2009–10, Stevenson left North America and signed a one-year contract with Swiss team EHC Kloten of the National League A on June 24, 2009. After only 3 appearances with the Flyers, he was surprisingly cut from the team due to the falling short of the Flyers ambitious expectations. Stevenson returned to the American Hockey League signing with the Hamilton Bulldogs for the remainder of the season on November 23, 2009. Grant tallied just 8 goals in 53 games with the Bulldogs but raised his play in the playoffs scoring 10 points in 19 games to help Hamilton reach the Western Conference finals of the Calder Cup.

On July 29, 2010, Stevenson opted for his second foray into Europe signing as a free agent with German team Augsburger Panther of the DEL.

== Personal information ==
He is the grandson of NHL Hall of Famer Glenn Hall.

== Awards and honours ==
Award	Year
All-WCHA First Team	2002–03
AHCA West Second-Team All-American	2002–03

- 1998–99: Spruce Grove's Midget AAA-Player of the Year
- 1999–00: Bonneyville's Rookie of the Year
- 1999–00: AJHL Prospect Game
- 2000–01: Grande Prairie's Top Forward
- 2000–01: AJHL All-Star Game.
- 2002–03: Jofa Second All-American Team.

== Career statistics ==
			Regular season					Playoffs
Season	Team	League	GP	G	A	Pts	PIM	GP	G	A	Pts	PIM
2001–02	Minnesota State Univ.	WCHA	38	8	8	16	36	—	—	—	—	—
2002–03	Minnesota State Univ.	WCHA	38	27	36	63	38	—	—	—	—	—
2003–04	Cleveland Barons	AHL	71	13	26	39	45	9	0	7	7	6
2004–05	Cleveland Barons	AHL	77	14	25	39	70	—	—	—	—	—
2004–05	Johnstown Chiefs	ECHL	44	4	11	15	28	—	—	—	—	—
2005–06	Cleveland Barons	AHL	17	8	8	16	8	—	—	—	—	—
2005–06	San Jose Sharks	NHL	47	10	12	22	14	5	0	0	0	4
2006–07	Worcester Sharks	AHL	59	14	25	39	30	6	2	0	2	2
2007–08	Quad City Flames	AHL	80	30	43	73	58	—	—	—	—	—
2008–09	Chicago Wolves	AHL	59	10	11	21	31	—	—	—	—	—
2009–10	Kloten Flyers	NLA	3	0	0	0	0	—	—	—	—	—
2009–10	Hamilton Bulldogs	AHL	53	8	9	17	22	19	1	9	10	8
2010–11	Augsburger Panther	DEL	49	11	24	35	18	—	—	—	—	—
NHL totals			47	10	12	22	14	5	0	0	0	4
