= Daniel Brickley =

American ice hockey player (born 1995)

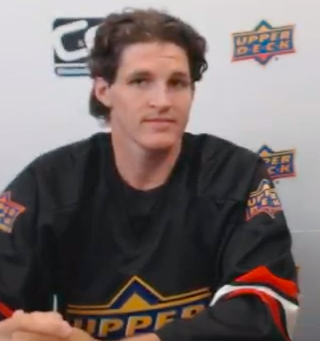
- Brickley in 2018
- Born: March 30, 1995 (age 31) Salt Lake City, Utah, U.S.
- Height: 6 ft 3 in (191 cm)
- Weight: 215 lb (98 kg; 15 st 5 lb)
- Position: Defense
- Shoots: Left
- Liiga team Former teams: Tappara; Los Angeles Kings; MoDo Hockey
- National team: United States
- NHL draft: Undrafted
- Playing career: 2017–present

Daniel Brickley (born March 30, 1995) is an American professional ice hockey defenseman who is currently playing for Tappara in the Liiga.

== Playing career ==
Brickley played for Skyline High School, winning back to back state championships in 2010 and 2011.

Brickley played Junior A for the Hawkesbury Hawks in the CCHL in Canada in the 2013-2014 season. He was recruited to play Major Junior for Gatineau and Erie but opted to keep his NCAA eligibility and stayed in Hawkesbury. He was awarded the team's Defenseman of The Year award.

Brickley played in the North American Hockey League (NAHL) with the Topeka RoadRunners where he was selected in the first round with Topeka's top pick in the NAHL draft. He committed to a collegiate career with Minnesota State University of the WCHA on November 19, 2014.

In his sophomore season with the Mavericks in the 2016–17 season, Brickley led the blueline on a top-pairing role. He collected 31 points in 31 games finishing as the WCHA's leading scorer amongst defenseman, earning selection to the conference First All-Star Team and Defensive Player of the Year honors. Brickley was subsequently honored as a Second Team All-American, and gained attention as a top undrafted NHL free agent. Brickley opted to continue his college career, returning to MSU for his junior season.

At the completion of his junior season with the Minnesota State Mavericks in the 2017–18 season, Brickley opted to conclude his collegiate career, signing as a free agent to a two-year, entry-level contract with the Los Angeles Kings on March 31, 2018. He made his NHL debut with the Kings, and recorded his first NHL point, on April 6, 2018, in a game against the Minnesota Wild.

During the 2019–20 season, re-assigned to Ontario of the AHL, Brickley was hampered by injury. He appeared in 11 games registering just 2 assists before he was re-assigned by the Kings to join the Manitoba Moose, primary affiliate of the Winnipeg Jets, on loan for the remainder of the season on March 2, 2020.

As a free agent from the Kings following the 2020–21 season, Brickley continued his career in the AHL, agreeing to a one-year contract with the Chicago Wolves, affiliate to the Carolina Hurricanes, on September 1, 2021. In the following 2021-22 season, Brickley split the year between the Wolves and the Norfolk Admirals of the ECHL.

On July 13, 2022, Brickley opted to sign his first European contract, agreeing to a one-year contract with Swedish second tier club, Västerviks IK of the Allsvenskan. He made his Allsvenskan debut in Västerviks first game of the season on September 23, 2022, against Tingsryds AIF. He provided an assist for Marcus Vela's decisive goal in overtime.

Following two seasons with MoDo Hockey, Brickley left Sweden at the conclusion of his contract and joined neighbouring league, the Finnish Liiga, in signing a one-year deal with Tappara on May 16, 2024.

== International play ==
Brickley made his Team USA debut participating for the American national team at the 2017 IIHF World Championship in Germany/France.

== Personal life ==
His uncle Andy Brickley played for and is currently the TV color analyst for the Boston Bruins on NESN, and his cousin Connor Brickley also played in the NHL for the New York Rangers. Daniel's father was a minor league linesman for 13 years in the IHL, AHL and ECHL.

== Career statistics ==
=== Regular season and playoffs ===
			Regular season					Playoffs
Season	Team	League	GP	G	A	Pts	PIM	GP	G	A	Pts	PIM
2013–14	Hawkesbury Hawks	CCHL	61	5	27	32	63	—	—	—	—	—
2014–15	Topeka RoadRunners	NAHL	58	12	25	37	102	8	2	5	7	2
2015–16	Minnesota State	WCHA	36	2	9	11	20	—	—	—	—	—
2016–17	Minnesota State	WCHA	31	8	23	31	20	—	—	—	—	—
2017–18	Minnesota State	WCHA	40	10	25	35	53	—	—	—	—	—
2017–18	Los Angeles Kings	NHL	1	0	1	1	0	—	—	—	—	—
2018–19	Ontario Reign	AHL	42	2	10	12	22	—	—	—	—	—
2018–19	Los Angeles Kings	NHL	4	0	1	1	0	—	—	—	—	—
2019–20	Ontario Reign	AHL	11	0	2	2	4	—	—	—	—	—
2019–20	Manitoba Moose	AHL	2	0	0	0	2	—	—	—	—	—
2020–21	Ontario Reign	AHL	23	3	3	6	8	1	0	0	0	0
2021–22	Norfolk Admirals	ECHL	25	6	14	20	12	—	—	—	—	—
2021–22	Chicago Wolves	AHL	11	0	2	2	4	—	—	—	—	—
2022–23	Västerviks IK	Allsv	31	7	21	28	18	—	—	—	—	—
2022–23	MoDo Hockey	Allsv	20	0	5	5	27	12	1	7	8	10
2023–24	MoDo Hockey	SHL	52	4	13	17	16	—	—	—	—	—
NHL totals			5	0	2	2	0	—	—	—	—	—
SHL totals			52	4	13	17	16	—	—	—	—	—

=== International ===
Year	Team	Event	Result	GP	G	A	Pts	PIM
2017	United States	WC	5th	5	0	0	0	2
Senior totals				5	0	0	0	2

== Awards and honors ==
Award	Year
NAHL
All-South Division Team	2015
College
WCHA All-Rookie Team	2016
All-WCHA First Team	2017
WCHA Defensive Player of the Year	2017
AHCA West Second-Team All-American	2017
All-WCHA Second Team	2018

Awards and achievements
Preceded by Casey Nelson	WCHA Defensive Player of the Year; 2016–17	Succeeded by Alec Rauhauser
