= Tyler Deis =

Canadian ice hockey player

- Born: July 10, 1974 (age 51) Calgary, Alberta, Canada
- Height: 6 ft 0 in (183 cm)
- Weight: 195 lb (88 kg; 13 st 13 lb)
- Position: Right wing
- Shot: Left
- Played for: ECHL; Charlotte Checkers; Baton Rouge Kingfish; Mobile Mysticks; Greenville Grrrowl; Cincinnati Cyclones; CHL; Wichita Thunder
- NHL draft: Undrafted
- Playing career: 1999–2004

Tyler Deis (born July 10, 1974) is a Canadian former professional ice hockey player. Between 1999 and 2004 Deis played 315 games in the ECHL where he scored 86 goals and 131 assists for 217 points while earning 682 penalty minutes.

Deis is currently the Head coach of the Okotoks Oilers in the AJHL. He won coach of the year in the 2017–18 season.
