= Shane Joseph =

Canadian ice hockey player

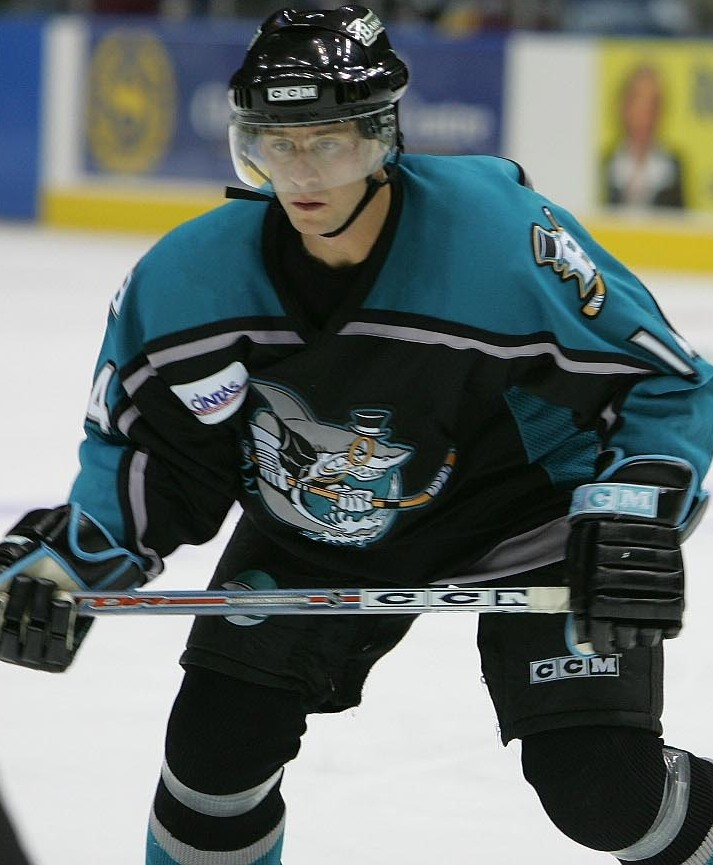
- Joseph with the Cleveland Barons in 2004
- Born: July 23, 1981 (age 43); Brooks, Alberta, Canada
- Height: 5 ft 10 in (178 cm)
- Weight: 180 lb (82 kg; 12 st 12 lb)
- Position: Winger
- Shot: Right
- Played for: Cleveland Barons; Augsburger Panther; DEG Metro Stars; Iserlohn Roosters
- NHL draft: Undrafted
- Playing career: 2004–2011

Shane Joseph (born July 23, 1981 in Brooks, Alberta) is a former Canadian professional ice hockey winger. He most recently played for the Iserlohn Roosters in the Deutsche Eishockey Liga.

== Playing career ==
Joseph began his hockey career in 1999 in the Western Collegiate Hockey Association and played for Minnesota State University, at Mankato. After an injury his freshman year he was given a redshirt status so he was still eligible for four more years. In the 2002–03 and 2003–04 seasons Joseph scored the most goals, assists, and points for the Mavericks, while earning an All-American award for the season 2002-03. After graduating, Joseph signed an amateur try-out contract with the Cleveland Barons of the American Hockey League, the former affiliate of the San Jose Sharks, for the 2003–04 season. He helped the Barons reach the semifinals of the divisional playoffs for the Calder Cup. On June 27, 2004, Joseph signed his first professional contract with the San Jose Sharks of the National Hockey League. He was later reassigned back to the Barons, so Joseph never got the chance to prove himself in the NHL.

He then joined the Augsburger Panther of the Deutsche Eishockey Liga for the 2006–07 season. After consistent performances Joseph was selected for the 2007 DEL All-Star Game. He finished his first European season as top scorer of the Panthers. After another year in Augsburg, Joseph finished as top scorer again, Joseph was signed by the management of the DEG Metro Stars for the 2008–09, 09-10 seasons.

With DEG, he helped the Stars to runner-up after being defeated in the 2009 finals to Eisbären Berlin. After completing his second season with DEG in 2009–10, his contract was not renewed. On May 10, 2010, Joseph signed a one-year contract with the Iserlohn Roosters.

In the 2010–11 season, Joseph placed third among the Roosters scoring with 37 points in 52 games. After failing to help Iserlohn reach the playoffs, Joseph was not tendered another contract.

== Career statistics ==
			Regular season					Playoffs
Season	Team	League	GP	G	A	Pts	PIM	GP	G	A	Pts	PIM
1999–00	Minnesota State University	WCHA	5	0	0	0	0	—	—	—	—	—
2000–01	Minnesota State University	WCHA	16	0	5	5	2	—	—	—	—	—
2001–02	Minnesota State University	WCHA	38	20	11	31	0	—	—	—	—	—
2002–03	Minnesota State University	WCHA	41	29	36	65	6	—	—	—	—	—
2003–04	Minnesota State University	WCHA	39	19	24	43	2	—	—	—	—	—
2003–04	Cleveland Barons	AHL	12	4	5	9	0	9	5	4	9	0
2004–05	Cleveland Barons	AHL	67	10	22	32	8	—	—	—	—	—
2005–06	Cleveland Barons	AHL	75	11	20	31	18	—	—	—	—	—
2006–07	Augsburger Panther	DEL	52	22	30	52	18	—	—	—	—	—
2007–08	Augsburger Panther	DEL	56	14	40	54	8	—	—	—	—	—
2008–09	DEG Metro Stars	DEL	52	16	23	39	16	16	5	12	17	0
2009–10	DEG Metro Stars	DEL	56	20	18	38	4	3	0	1	1	2
2010–11	Iserlohn Roosters	DEL	52	10	27	37	4	—	—	—	—	—
AHL totals			154	25	47	72	26	9	5	4	9	0

== Awards and honours ==
Award	Year
All-WCHA First Team	2002–03
AHCA West Second-Team All-American	2002–03
WCHA All-Tournament Team	2003
All-WCHA Third Team	2003–04
