= 2022–23 NCHC season =

- Season: 2022–23
- Conference: NCHC
- Division: Division I
- Sport: ice hockey
- Duration: October 1, 2022– March 25, 2023
- Number of teams: 8

NHL Entry Draft
- Top draft pick: Ty Mueller
- Picked by: Vancouver Canucks

Regular season
- Season champions: Denver
- Season MVP: Jason Polin
- Top scorer: Massimo Rizzo

NCHC Tournament
- Tournament champions: St. Cloud State
- Runners-up: Colorado College
- Tournament MVP: Jami Kranilla
- Top scorer: Jack Devine (5)

NCAA tournament
- Bids: 3
- Record: 1–3
- Best Finish: Regional Final
- Team(s): St. Cloud State

The 2022–23 NCHC season was the 10th season of play for National Collegiate Hockey Conference and took place during the 2022–23 NCAA Division I men's ice hockey season. The season began on October 1, 2022, and concluded on March 25, 2023.

== Coaches ==
=== Records ===
Team	Head coach	Season at school	Record at school	NCHC record
Colorado College	Kris Mayotte	2	9–24–3	6–17–1
Denver	David Carle	5	86–43–13	49–37–9
Miami	Chris Bergeron	4	20–66–9	14–53–6
Minnesota Duluth	Scott Sandelin	23	428–348–95	117–79–21
North Dakota	Brad Berry	8	162–77–25	102–52–15
Omaha	Mike Gabinet	6	75–86–9	48–65–7
St. Cloud State	Brett Larson	5	81–47–13	54–33–9
Western Michigan	Pat Ferschweiler	2	26–12–1	14–9–1

== Standings ==
2022–23 National Collegiate Hockey Conference Standings
	Conference record										Overall record					
	GP	W	L	T	OTW	OTL	SW	PTS	GF	GA	GP	W	L	T	GF	GA
#6 Denver †	24	19	5	0	2	1	0	56	94	53	40	30	10	0	150	86
#11 Western Michigan	24	15	8	1	2	0	0	44	86	60	39	23	15	1	148	102
#20 Omaha	24	13	9	2	2	2	1	42	71	64	37	19	15	3	109	97
#5 St. Cloud State *	24	12	9	3	2	1	3	41	85	68	41	25	13	3	133	95
Minnesota Duluth	24	10	14	0	1	4	0	33	65	81	37	16	20	1	95	114
#17 North Dakota	24	10	10	4	3	0	2	33	75	70	39	18	15	6	127	110
Colorado College	24	6	15	3	0	2	2	25	37	60	38	13	22	3	79	99
Miami	24	3	18	3	0	2	0	14	39	96	36	8	24	4	73	137
Championship: March 18, 2023 † indicates conference regular season champion (Penrose Cup) * indicates conference tournament champion (Frozen Faceoff Championship Trophy); Rankings: USCHO.com Top 20 Poll

== Non-Conference record ==
Of the sixteen teams that are selected to participate in the NCAA tournament, ten will be via at-large bids. Those 10 teams are determined based upon the PairWise rankings. The rankings take into account all games played but are heavily affected by intra-conference results. The result is that teams from leagues which perform better in non-conference are much more likely to receive at-large bids even if they possess inferior records overall.

NCHC had a good season against non-conference opponents. While only one member team had a losing record outside of league play (Colorado College), three teams were only just above .500. Additionally, most of the conference's wins came against either the CCHA or Independent programs, many of which were low-ranked teams and didn't help the NCHC's position as much as they otherwise could have. This caused the NCHC to have just three teams in the top 15 of the rankings as opposed to the five they had the year before with a nearly-identical overall record.

=== Regular season record ===
Team	Atlantic Hockey	Big Ten	CCHA	ECAC Hockey	Hockey East	Independent	Total
Colorado College	1–1–0	0–0–0	0–0–0	1–3–0	0–0–0	2–2–0	4–6–0
Denver	0–0–0	1–0–0	0–0–0	0–0–0	3–2–0	5–1–0	9–3–0
Miami	3–1–0	0–2–0	1–0–1	0–0–0	1–1–0	0–0–0	5–4–1
Minnesota Duluth	0–0–0	0–2–0	1–2–1	2–0–0	0–0–0	2–0–0	5–4–1
North Dakota	2–0–0	1–1–0	1–0–1	0–1–1	0–0–0	2–1–0	6–3–2
Omaha	0–2–0	0–0–0	1–0–1	1–1–0	0–0–0	3–1–0	5–4–1
St. Cloud State	0–0–0	3–1–0	5–1–0	0–0–0	0–0–0	0–0–0	8–2–0
Western Michigan	0–0–0	1–3–0	5–0–0	0–0–0	1–0–0	1–1–0	8–4–0
Overall	6–4–0	6–9–0	14–3–4	4–5–1	5–3–0	15–6–0	50–30–5

== Statistics ==
=== Leading scorers ===
GP = Games played; G = Goals; A = Assists; Pts = Points; PIM = Penalties in minutes

Player	Class	Team	GP	G	A	Pts	PIM
Massimo Rizzo	Sophomore	Denver	24	11	20	31	6
Jason Polin	Senior	Western Michigan	24	17	12	29	11
Jami Krannila	Senior	St. Cloud State	24	17	12	29	31
Jackson Blake	Freshman	North Dakota	24	10	19	29	14
Zach Okabe	Senior	St. Cloud State	24	12	13	25	18
Carter Mazur	Sophomore	Denver	24	15	9	24	24
Ryan McAllister	Freshman	Western Michigan	24	6	18	24	12
Riese Gaber	Junior	North Dakota	24	13	10	23	27
Aidan Thompson	Freshman	Denver	22	9	14	23	4
Max Sasson	Sophomore	Western Michigan	23	8	15	23	8
Veeti Miettinen	Junior	St. Cloud State	24	8	15	23	0

=== Leading goaltenders ===
Minimum 1/3 of team's minutes played in conference games.
GP = Games played; Min = Minutes played; W = Wins; L = Losses; T = Ties; GA = Goals against; SO = Shutouts; SV% = Save percentage; GAA = Goals against average

Player	Class	Team	GP	Min	W	L	T	GA	SO	SV%	GAA
Šimon Latkoczy	Freshman	Omaha	12	675:51	7	3	1	22	2	.933	1.95
Magnus Chrona	Senior	Denver	22	1291:16	17	4	0	48	4	.915	2.23
Kaidan Mbereko	Freshman	Colorado College	22	1221:26	5	13	2	46	3	.930	2.26
Cameron Rowe	Junior	Western Michigan	24	1406:57	15	7	1	55	2	.912	2.35
Drew DeRidder	Graduate	North Dakota	20	1106:18	9	5	4	44	3	.902	2.39

== Conference tournament ==
Teams are reseeded for the semifinals.

Quarterfinals; March 10–12
1	Denver	6	7	-
8	Miami	2	2	-
2	Western Michigan	1	2	-
7	Colorado College	3	3*	-
3	Omaha	2	1	2
6	North Dakota	1	3	5
4	St. Cloud State	3	1	3
5	Minnesota Duluth	1	5	1

Semifinals; March 17
1	Denver	0
7	Colorado College	1
4	St. Cloud State	3*
6	North Dakota	2

Championship; March 18
7	Colorado College	0
4	St. Cloud State	3

* denotes overtime periods

== NCAA tournament ==
=== Regional semifinal ===
==== East ====
March 23, 2023; 5:30 PM	(1) Denver	0 – 2 (0–2, 0–0, 0–0)	(4) Cornell	SNHU Arena; Attendance: 3,631

Game reference
Magnus Chrona	Goalies	Ian Shane	Referees: Andrew Bruggerman; Sean Fernandez; Linesmen: Tommy George; Jake Davis
0–1 / 02:49 – GW – Jack O'Leary (6) (Andreev, Stienburg); 0–2 / 11:28 – Ben Berard (11) (O'Leary)			Referees: Andrew Bruggerman; Sean Fernandez; Linesmen: Tommy George; Jake Davis
11 min	Penalties	7 min	Referees: Andrew Bruggerman; Sean Fernandez; Linesmen: Tommy George; Jake Davis
27	Shots	27	Referees: Andrew Bruggerman; Sean Fernandez; Linesmen: Tommy George; Jake Davis

March 23, 2023; 2:00 PM	(2) Boston University	5 – 1 (1–0, 3–1, 1–0)	(3) Western Michigan	SNHU Arena; Attendance: 3,631

Game reference

Drew Commesso
Goalies
Cameron Rowe
Referees:
Scott Roth
Mike Forys
Linesmen:
Nathan Voll
Tyler Landman

(O'Brien, Phillips) Lane Hutson (15) – 15:24	1–0
(Fensore) Quinn Hutson (15) – GW – 28:53	2–0
(Phillips) Matt Brown (16) – 30:20	3–0
	3–1	32:24 – Jason Polin (30) (McAllister, Washe)
(Wilmer) Wilmer Skoog (15) – 37:16	4–1
(unassisted) Ethan Phillips (3) – EN – 57:34	5–1

8 min
Penalties
8 min
28
Shots
25

==== West ====
March 23, 2023; 4:00 PM	(2) St. Cloud State	4 – 0 (0–0, 2–0, 2–0)	(3) Minnesota State	Scheels Arena; Attendance: 5,061

Game reference

Jaxon Castor
Goalies
Keenan Rancier
Referees:
Cameron Lynch
Chris Pitoscia
Linesmen:
Adam Wood
Stephen Drain

(Cruikshank, Ingram) Veeti Miettinen (12) – PP GW – 32:30	1–0
(Rogers, Ahcan) Jack Peart (3) – 37:23	2–0
(Spellacy, Miettinen) Zach Okabe (18) – 53:03	3–0
(Miller) Grant Cruikshank (23) – EN – 56:44	4–0

8 min
Penalties
6 min
21
Shots
34

=== Regional final ===
==== West ====
March 25, 2023; 6:30 PM	(1) Minnesota	4 – 1 (1–0, 1–1, 2–0)	(2) St. Cloud State	Scheels Arena; Attendance: 5,326

Game reference

Justen Close
Goalies
Jaxon Castor
Referees:
Jeremy Tufts
Steven Rouillard
Linesmen:
Kevin Briganti
Bill Kingdon

(Nelson, Nevers) Bryce Brodzinski (19) – 06:40	1–0
	1–1	23:07 – Adam Ingram (8) (Wylie, Cruikshank)
(LaCombe) Logan Cooley (3) – GW – 25:57	2–1
(Cooley) Jackson LaCombe (9) – 51:44	3–1
(unassisted) Jaxon Nelson (9) – EN – 59:29	4–1

10 min
Penalties
6 min
30
Shots
28

== Ranking ==
=== USCHO ===
Team	Pre	1	2	3	4	5	6	7	8	9	10	11	12	13	14	15	16	17	18	19	20	21	22	23	24	25	26	Final
Colorado College	NR	-	NR	NR	NR	NR	NR	NR	NR	NR	NR	NR	NR	-	NR	NR	NR	NR	NR	NR	NR	NR	NR	NR	NR	NR	-	NR
Denver	1	-	1	1	4	3	2	2	1	1	1	1	1	-	1	4	3	5	4	4	3	3	3	3	3	4	-	6
Miami	NR	-	NR	NR	NR	NR	NR	NR	NR	NR	NR	NR	NR	-	NR	NR	NR	NR	NR	NR	NR	NR	NR	NR	NR	NR	-	NR
Minnesota Duluth	5	-	4	4	10	19	19	20	NR	NR	NR	NR	NR	-	NR	NR	NR	NR	NR	NR	NR	NR	NR	NR	NR	NR	-	NR
North Dakota	4	-	3	3	7	6	10	12	19	NR	NR	NR	NR	-	NR	NR	NR	NR	NR	NR	NR	NR	NR	NR	17	17	-	17
Omaha	NR	-	NR	NR	NR	NR	NR	NR	NR	NR	NR	NR	NR	-	NR	NR	NR	NR	19	16	15	14	14	17	18	20	-	20
St. Cloud State	13	-	10	10	8	2	4	4	4	3	3	4	4	-	4	3	4	1	5	6	6	6	6	7	7	6	-	5
Western Michigan	14	-	18	18	17	17	18	17	14	15	14	17	18	-	13	12	10	9	10	9	8	5	8	7	9	9	-	11

=== USA Today ===
Team	Pre	1	2	3	4	5	6	7	8	9	10	11	12	13	14	15	16	17	18	19	20	21	22	23	24	25	26	Final
Colorado College	NR	NR	NR	NR	NR	NR	NR	NR	NR	NR	NR	NR	NR	NR	NR	NR	NR	NR	NR	NR	NR	NR	NR	NR	NR	NR	NR	NR
Denver	1	1	1	1	4	3	2	2	1	1	2	1	1	2	2	3	3	3	4	4	3	3	3	3	3	4	7	6
Miami	NR	NR	NR	NR	NR	NR	NR	NR	NR	NR	NR	NR	NR	NR	NR	NR	NR	NR	NR	NR	NR	NR	NR	NR	NR	NR	NR	NR
Minnesota Duluth	5	5	4	4	10	19	19	NR	NR	NR	NR	NR	NR	NR	NR	NR	NR	NR	NR	NR	NR	NR	NR	NR	NR	NR	NR	NR
North Dakota	4	4	3	3	7	7	11	13	19	NR	NR	NR	NR	NR	NR	NR	NR	NR	NR	NR	NR	NR	NR	NR	16	16	16	18
Omaha	NR	NR	NR	NR	NR	NR	NR	NR	NR	NR	NR	NR	NR	NR	NR	NR	NR	NR	16	16	15	15	14	18	19	NR	NR	NR
St. Cloud State	13	13	11	10	8	2	4	4	5	3	3	4	4	4	4	4	4	1	5	6	6	6	6	8	7	6	5	5
Western Michigan	12	12	18	18	17	16	18	17	12	15	14	17	19	19	14	12	10	9	10	9	8	5	8	8	9	11	11	12

=== Pairwise ===
Team	2	3	4	5	6	7	8	9	10	11	12	14	15	16	17	18	19	20	21	22	23	24	Final
Colorado College	22	9	24	45	47	45	34	42	45	45	41	31	30	29	33	33	35	30	39	38	40	36	31
Denver	22	1	15	6	5	3	2	1	5	3	4	3	5	4	5	7	6	5	4	3	3	3	4
Miami	12	8	18	5	15	26	28	29	37	36	35	39	41	44	46	46	44	44	47	43	44	44	45
Minnesota Duluth	10	32	35	38	35	33	42	38	32	39	39	33	28	36	31	24	24	24	23	25	23	22	22
North Dakota	22	39	12	24	31	23	27	28	22	22	22	17	13	22	23	19	20	22	21	21	21	18	18
Omaha	22	50	51	47	30	35	30	31	25	21	27	24	26	22	20	17	16	17	13	16	18	19	20
St. Cloud State	3	15	7	1	2	2	6	4	4	4	6	5	3	5	2	5	7	7	5	5	7	7	6
Western Michigan	13	18	22	13	20	15	11	18	13	18	22	14	12	10	9	10	8	8	6	9	8	10	10

Note: teams ranked in the top-10 automatically qualify for the NCAA tournament. Teams ranked 11-16 can qualify based upon conference tournament results.

== Awards ==
=== NCAA ===
AHCA West All-American Second Team
Player	Position	Team
Michael Benning	D	Denver
Carter Mazur	F	Denver
Jason Polin	F	Western Michigan
Massimo Rizzo	F	Denver

=== NCHC ===
Award		Recipient
Player of the Year		Jason Polin, Western Michigan
Rookie of the Year		Jackson Blake, North Dakota
Goaltender of the Year		Magnus Chrona, Denver
Forward of the Year		Jason Polin, Western Michigan
Defensive Defenseman of the Year		Justin Lee, Denver
Offensive Defenseman of the Year		Michael Benning, Denver
Defensive Forward of the Year		Jami Krannila, St. Cloud State
Scholar-Athlete of the Year		Ethan Frisch, North Dakota
Three Stars Award		Magnus Chrona, Denver
Sportsmanship Award		Spencer Meier, St. Cloud State
Herb Brooks Coach of the Year		Pat Ferschweiler, Western Michigan
All-NCHC Teams
First Team	Position	Second Team
Magnus Chrona, Denver	G	Kaidan Mbereko, Colorado College
Michael Benning, Denver	D	Jack Peart, St. Cloud State
Chris Jandric, North Dakota	D	Wyatt Kaiser, Minnesota Duluth
Jason Polin, Western Michigan	F	Carter Mazur, Denver
Massimo Rizzo, Denver	F	Jackson Blake, North Dakota
Jami Krannila, St. Cloud State	F	Riese Gaber, North Dakota
Honorable Mention	Position	Rookie Team
Šimon Latkoczy, Omaha	G	Kaidan Mbereko, Colorado College
Sean Behrens, Denver	D	Joaquim Lemay, Omaha
Dylan Anhorn, St. Cloud State	D	Jacob Guévin, Omaha
Hunter McKown, Colorado College	F	Jackson Blake, North Dakota
Ben Steeves, Minnesota Duluth	F	Ryan McAllister, Western Michigan
Jack Randl, Omaha	F	Ben Steeves, Minnesota Duluth
Ryan McAllister, Western Michigan	F	
Zach Okabe, St. Cloud State	F	

=== NCHC Tournament ===
Tournament MVP
Jami Krannila		Minnesota Duluth
Frozen Faceoff All-Tournament Team
Player	Pos	Team
Jaxon Castor	G	St. Cloud State
Bryan Yoon	D	Colorado College
Jack Peart	D	St. Cloud State
Jami Krannila	F	St. Cloud State
Zach Okabe	F	St. Cloud State
Hunter McKown	F	Colorado College

== 2023 NHL entry draft ==
Round	Pick	Player	College	NHL team
2	35	Adam Gajan ^{†}	Minnesota Duluth	Chicago Blackhawks
3	81	Tanner Ludtke ^{†}	Omaha	Arizona Coyotes
3	82	Zach Nehring ^{†}	Western Michigan	Winnipeg Jets
3	94	Jayden Perron ^{†}	North Dakota	Carolina Hurricanes
4	98	Andrew Strathmann ^{†}	North Dakota	Columbus Blue Jackets
4	105	Ty Mueller	Omaha	Vancouver Canucks
4	115	Jayson Shaugabay ^{†}	Minnesota Duluth	Tampa Bay Lightning
4	119	Matthew Perkins ^{†}	Minnesota Duluth	Vancouver Canucks
4	124	Beckett Hendrickson ^{†}	Minnesota Duluth	Boston Bruins
5	133	Sam Harris ^{†}	Denver	Montreal Canadiens
5	149	Aaron Pionk ^{†}	Minnesota Duluth	Minnesota Wild
6	166	Carsen Musser ^{†}	Colorado College	Arizona Coyotes
6	179	Warren Clark ^{†}	St. Cloud State	Tampa Bay Lightning
6	183	Ty Henricks ^{†}	Western Michigan	New York Rangers
6	190	Michael Emerson ^{†}	North Dakota	Carolina Hurricanes
6	196	David Klee ^{†}	North Dakota	San Jose Sharks
7	204	Owen Beckner ^{†}	Colorado College	Ottawa Senators
7	212	Zaccharya Wisdom ^{†}	Colorado College	Seattle Kraken
7	214	Casper Nassen ^{†}	Miami	Boston Bruins

† incoming freshman
