= National Collegiate Hockey Conference tournament =

- Conference hockey championship
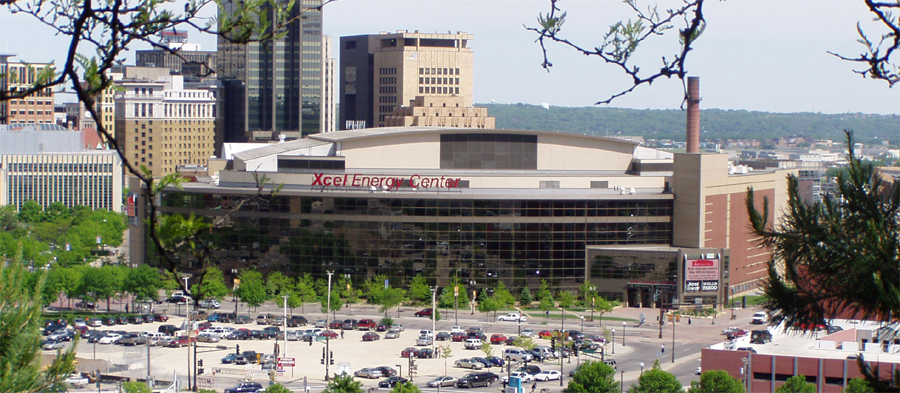
- The Grand Casino Arena in St. Paul, Minnesota has hosted the championship five times, the most of any venue.
- Sport: Ice hockey
- Conference: NCHC
- Format: Single-elimination (Semifinal & Final); Best two-of-three tournament (Quarterfinal)
- Current location: Campus Sites
- Played: 2014–present
- Last contest: 2025
- Current champion: Western Michigan (1st title)
- Most championships: Denver (3 titles); Minnesota–Duluth (3 titles)
- Winner trophy: National Cup
- TV partner: CBS Sports Network
- Official website: The Official Site of NCHC Hockey

The National Collegiate Hockey Conference tournament is the conference tournament for the NCHC. The winner of the tournament receives an automatic berth into the NCAA Division I men's ice hockey tournament.

== History ==
The NCHC was founded in the 2013–14 season with eight former WCHA and CCHA members. The inaugural tournament was held in 2014 and included all eight conference members in a three-round championship. The inaugural championship was won by Denver by a score of 4–3 over Miami. The first four NCHC Championship games were held at the Target Center in Minneapolis, Minnesota, before shifting over to the Grand Casino Arena in nearby Saint Paul, Minnesota.

Due to the COVID-19 pandemic, the 2020 tournament was cancelled. The 2021 tournament was also affected by the pandemic, as tournament was moved to Grand Forks, North Dakota to be hosted at North Dakota's home rink, the Ralph Engelstad Arena. The hosting Fighting Hawks would win this tournament, marking their first NCHC tournament championship. Additionally, this would be the first time the tournament's championship round was held outside the Twin Cities area.

In 2026, the tournament will move away from the Twin Cities and be hosted at campus sites for the first time ever, excluding the moved 2021 tournament.

== Championship appearances ==
=== By school ===
School	Championships	Appearances	Pct.
Denver	3	4	.750
Minnesota–Duluth	3	4	.750
St. Cloud State	2	6	.333
Miami	1	2	.500
North Dakota	1	2	.500
Western Michigan	1	2	.500
Colorado College	0	1	.000
Omaha	0	1	.000

=== By coach ===
Coach	Championships	Appearances	Pct.
Scott Sandelin	3	4	.750
Jim Montgomery	2	2	1.000
Bob Motzko	1	3	.333
Brad Berry	1	2	.500
Enrico Blasi	1	2	.500
David Carle	1	2	.500
Pat Ferschweiler	1	2	.500
Brett Larson	1	2	.500
Mike Gabinet	0	1	.000
Kris Mayotte	0	1	.000

== Performance by team ==
The code in each cell represents the furthest the team made it in the respective tournament:

- – Team not in NCHC
- QF Quarterfinals
- SF Semifinals
- F Finals
- CH Champion

Note: the 2020 tournament was cancelled prior to the start of the quarterfinal round.

School	#	QF	SF	F	CH	14	15	16	17	18	19	20	21	22	23	24	25
Denver	12	12	11	4	3	CH	SF	SF	SF	CH	SF	QF	SF	SF	SF	CH	F
Minnesota Duluth	12	12	6	4	3	QF	QF	F	CH	SF	CH	QF	SF	CH	QF	QF	QF
St. Cloud State	12	12	7	6	2	QF	F	CH	QF	F	F	QF	F	QF	CH	SF	QF
North Dakota	12	12	10	2	1	SF	SF	SF	F	SF	QF	QF	CH	SF	SF	SF	SF
Western Michigan	12	12	4	2	1	SF	QF	QF	SF	QF	QF	QF	QF	F	QF	QF	CH
Miami	11	11	2	2	1	F	CH	QF	QF	QF	QF	QF	QF	QF	QF	QF	
Colorado College	12	12	2	1	0	QF	QF	QF	QF	QF	SF	QF	QF	QF	F	QF	QF
Omaha	12	12	1	1	0	QF	QF	QF	QF	QF	QF	QF	QF	QF	QF	F	QF
Arizona State	1	1	1	0	0	–	–	–	–	–	–	–	–	–	–	–	SF

== Format ==
The NCHC Tournament begins with four best-of-three series featuring the conference's top eight teams held at campus sites. The semifinals and finals are single-elimination games held at the Grand Casino Arena.

Prior to Arizona State joining the NCHC during the 2024–25 season, all eight conference teams made the tournament. Initially, the eighth and ninth seeds were intended to contest a play-in game at the site of the first seed in 2025, but this format was later changed to include only the top eight teams and eliminate the play-in game. The tournament will move entirely to campus sites in 2026 and adopt a three-week format, once again including only the conference's top eight teams. Beginning in 2027 with the addition of St. Thomas to the NCHC, all ten teams will once again participate in the tournament.

== Location of NCHC Tournaments ==
- 2014–17: Target Center, Minneapolis, Minnesota
- 2018–20 (Note: The NCHC Tournament was cancelled in 2020 due to the COVID-19 pandemic, however, it was planned to be held at the Xcel Energey Center.) , 2022–25: Xcel Energy Center, St. Paul, Minnesota
- 2021 (Note: The 2021 NCHC Tournament was held at Ralph Engelstad Arena due to the COVID-19 pandemic.): Ralph Engelstad Arena, Grand Forks, North Dakota
- 2026–Future: Campus Sites
