= 2022–23 Omaha Mavericks men's ice hockey season =

- Conference: 3rd NCHC
- Home ice: Baxter Arena

Rankings
- USCHO: #20
- USA Today: NR

Record
- Overall: 19–15–3
- Conference: 13–9–2
- Home: 11–8–2
- Road: 8–7–1

Coaches and captains
- Head coach: Mike Gabinet
- Assistant coaches: Dave Noël-Bernier; Paul Jerrard; Rob Couturier
- Captain: Nolan Sullivan
- Alternate captain(s): Matt Miller; Jack Randl

The 2022–23 Omaha Mavericks men's ice hockey season was the 26th season of play for the program and 10th in the NCHC. The Mavericks represented the University of Nebraska Omaha, played their home games at Baxter Arena and were coached by Mike Gabinet in his 6th season.

== Season ==
As the Mavericks came into the season, the team was having to remake all three sections of the team. After losing both goaltenders from last year, coach Gabinet brought in freshman Šimon Latkoczy and transfer Jake Kucharski to man the pipes. The defense was a little more stable, however, the two regular the team lost still had to be replaced. On the offensive side, Omaha was without 4 of its top 5 scorers from '22 and, while they did bring in graduate transfer Jacob Pivonka, Omaha would likely need to see significant improvements from the returning players.

The great uncertainty with they roster left the Mavs outside of the polls at the start of the season, but that was the least of their worries. Omaha opened the season at home against Niagara, with most expecting a pair of easy wins for the Mavericks. Both goaltenders got off to a poor start in their debuts by allowing 4 goals each and allowing the team to get swept. With the Purple Eagles expected to be a low-ranked team by the end of the year, those two losses could act like an albatross with the team's national ranking. In the meantime, the team had some work to do on the defensive end and saw some improvements during the rest of their non-conference schedule. Omaha went 4–1–1 to finish out October and get themselves back above .500. Though the goaltending rotation initially favored the experienced Kucharski, Latkoczy quickly was getting used to the collegiate level.

As Omaha progressed into their NCHC slate, the team played well and had a credible record through 4 weeks, playing against a gauntlet of teams in the top 20. Right before the winter break, however, the Mavericks were swept by Colorado College and pushed back down to an exactly average mark.

When the team began the second half of its season, they were facing an uphill battle to make the NCAA tournament. While they weren't too far out of the race, sitting in the mid-20's in the PairWise, the NCHC was having a bad season with several of its usual contenders floundering. The reduced strength of schedule would make Omaha's task more difficult by requiring the team to play nearly perfect hockey in the second half. Unfortunately, the Mavericks' offense failed them against St. Lawrence and they began with a loss. With even less margin for error, Omaha's defense came into its own and led the team to a 5 game winning streak. After earning a split with Western Michigan, the Mavericks appeared in the polls for the first time on the year. Two weeks later, and no losses in 4 games, the Mavericks suddenly found themselves in the top 15 of the PairWise and in line for an at-large bid.

In the midst of the team's stellar run, tragedy struck when assistant coach Paul Jerrard died on February 15. Jerrard had been fighting cancer for a while but had not stopped coaching through his treatment.

With Omaha clinging to their playoff hopes, the team entered the final two weeks of the regular season needing to go even or better. The Mavs accomplished that goal against St. Cloud State with alternating 6–2 finals. Although they dropped to 16, a solid performance against North Dakota could easily undo that damage. Unfortunately, the team was inconsistent in their final weekend and ended up losing both games by 1 goal.

As the playoffs began, Omaha was sitting just under the cut line, however, the Mavericks had finished 3rd in the NCHC. Their strong second half enabled the team to get a home site for the quarterfinals and a rematch with the Fighting Hawks. Latkoczy was given the job of stifling UND and performed perfectly in the first game, stopping 40 shots en route to a 2–1 victory. Unfortunately, the team's offense was never able to get going in the series. Omaha scored just 5 goals in 3 games and lost the final two. In their season finale, the Mavs were only able to muster 14 shots and went 0–6 on the power play.

== Departures ==
Player	Position	Nationality	Cause
Joseph Abate	Forward	United States	Signed professional contract (Providence Bruins)
Kevin Conley	Forward	United States	Graduation (signed with Reading Royals)
Jake Harrison	Defenseman	Canada	Left program (retired)
Nate Knoepke	Defenseman	United States	Graduation (signed with Rochester Americans)
Brannon McManus	Forward	Canada	Graduation (signed with Abbotsford Canucks)
Chayse Primeau	Forward	United States	Graduate transfer to Notre Dame
Austin Roden	Goaltender	Canada	Transferred to Providence
Isaiah Saville	Goaltender	United States	Signed professional contract (Vegas Golden Knights)
Brandon Scanlin	Defenseman	Canada	Signed professional contract (New York Rangers)
Jason Smallidge	Defenseman	United States	Graduation (retired)
Martin Sundberg	Forward	Sweden	Graduation (retired)
Taylor Ward	Forward	Canada	Graduation (signed with Los Angeles Kings)

== Recruiting ==
Player	Position	Nationality	Age	Notes
Michael Abgrall	Forward	Canada	18	Richmond, BC
Ray Fust	Forward	Switzerland	19	Bellinzona, SUI
Jacob Guévin	Defenseman	United States	19	Drummondville, QC
Jake Kucharski	Goaltender	United States	23	Erie, PA; Selected 197th overall in 2018; transfer from American International
Šimon Latkoczy	Goaltender	Slovakia	20	Trenčín, SVK
Joaquim Lemay	Defenseman	Canada	20	St-Pierre-les-Becquets, QC; selected 119th overall in 2021
Griffin Ludtke	Defenseman	United States	19	Elko, MN
Cam Mitchell	Forward	United States	21	Stony Plain, AB
Jacob Pivonka	Forward	United States	20	Olathe, KS; graduate transfer from Notre Dame
Tyler Rollwagen	Forward	United States	21	Bloomington, MN
Jacob Slipec	Forward	Canada	20	White Rock, BC

=== Current roster ===
As of December 24, 2022.

No.	Nat.	Player	Class	Pos	Height	Weight	DoB	Hometown	Previous team	NHL rights
1	(United States)	Jake Kucharski	Senior	G	6' 4" (1.93 m)	216 lb (98 kg)	1999-09-25	Erie, Pennsylvania	American International (AHA)	CAR, 197th overall 2018
2	(Canada)	Joaquim Lemay	Freshman	D	6' 1" (1.85 m)	172 lb (78 kg)	2002-07-28	Saint-Pierre-les-Becquets, Quebec	Lincoln Stars (USHL)	WSH, 119th overall 2021
3	(Canada)	Kirby Proctor	Senior	D	6' 3" (1.91 m)	197 lb (89 kg)	2001-04-20	Okotoks, Alberta	Des Moines Buccaneers (USHL)	—
7	(United States)	Griffin Ludtke	Freshman	D	5' 10" (1.78 m)	171 lb (78 kg)	2003-02-01	Elko, Minnesota	Sioux City Musketeers (USHL)	—
8	(Switzerland)	Ray Fust	Freshman	F	6' 3" (1.91 m)	205 lb (93 kg)	2002-10-23	Bellinzona, Switzerland	Waterloo Black Hawks (USHL)	—
10	(Canada)	Jacob Guévin	Freshman	D	5' 11" (1.8 m)	182 lb (83 kg)	2003-01-17	Drummondville, Quebec	Muskegon Lumberjacks (USHL)	—
11	(United States)	Nolan Sullivan (C)	Senior	F	5' 11" (1.8 m)	203 lb (92 kg)	1999-05-21	Eden Prairie, Minnesota	Muskegon Lumberjacks (USHL)	—
12	(United States)	Nolan Krenzen	Junior	D	5' 9" (1.75 m)	180 lb (82 kg)	2001-07-13	Duluth, Minnesota	Omaha Lancers (USHL)	—
13	(Canada)	Jacob Slipec	Freshman	F	5' 11" (1.8 m)	180 lb (82 kg)	2001-12-05	White Rock, British Columbia	Surrey Eagles (BCHL)	—
16	(Canada)	Cam Mitchell	Freshman	F	5' 9" (1.75 m)	1740 lb (789 kg)	2001-03-09	Stony Plain, Alberta	Omaha Lancers (USHL)	—
17	(United States)	Cameron Berg	Sophomore	F	6' 0" (1.83 m)	195 lb (88 kg)	2002-01-29	White Bear Lake, Minnesota	Muskegon Lumberjacks (USHL)	NYI, 125th overall 2021
18	(Canada)	Michael Abgrall	Freshman	F	5' 10" (1.78 m)	170 lb (77 kg)	2003-10-25	Richmond, British Columbia	Surrey Eagles (BCHL)	—
19	(Canada)	Ty Mueller	Sophomore	F	5' 11" (1.8 m)	200 lb (91 kg)	2003-02-26	Cochrane, Alberta	Sherwood Park Crusaders (AJHL)	—
20	(Canada)	Jonny Tychonick	Graduate	D	6' 0" (1.83 m)	187 lb (85 kg)	2000-03-03	Calgary, Alberta	North Dakota (NCHC)	OTT, 48th overall 2018
21	(United States)	Tyler Rollwagen	Freshman	F	5' 11" (1.8 m)	181 lb (82 kg)	2001-03-20	Bloomington, Minnesota	Fargo Force (USHL)	—
22	(United States)	Jimmy Glynn	Junior	F	5' 10" (1.78 m)	168 lb (76 kg)	2000-02-24	Lemont, Illinois	Dubuque Fighting Saints (USHL)	—
23	(United States)	Victor Mancini	Sophomore	D	6' 4" (1.93 m)	215 lb (98 kg)	2002-05-26	Saginaw, Michigan	Green Bay Gamblers (USHL)	NYR, 159th overall 2022
26	(United States)	Brock Bremer	Junior	F	5' 5" (1.65 m)	140 lb (64 kg)	1999-08-26	Forest Lake, Minnesota	Lincoln Stars (USHL)	—
27	(United States)	Matt Miller (A)	Junior	F	6' 2" (1.88 m)	194 lb (88 kg)	1999-09-04	Leo, Indiana	Lincoln Stars (USHL)	—
28	(United States)	Jack Randl (A)	Senior	F	5' 10" (1.78 m)	175 lb (79 kg)	2000-05-07	Carpentersville, Illinois	Omaha Lancers (USHL)	—
29	(United States)	Kaden Bohlsen	Junior	F	6' 3" (1.91 m)	192 lb (87 kg)	2001-01-10	Willmar, Minnesota	Fargo Force (USHL)	—
30	(Slovakia)	Šimon Latkoczy	Freshman	G	5' 11" (1.8 m)	175 lb (79 kg)	2002-06-01	Trenčín, Slovakia	Madison Capitols (USHL)	—
35	(United States)	Jacob Zab	Senior	G	5' 9" (1.75 m)	175 lb (79 kg)	1998-04-12	Mentor, Ohio	Pittsburgh Vengeance (USPHL)	—
40	(United States)	Tyler Weiss	Graduate	F	5' 11" (1.8 m)	146 lb (66 kg)	2000-01-03	Raleigh, North Carolina	USNTDP (USHL)	COL, 109th overall 2018
44	(United States)	Jake Pivonka	Graduate	F	6' 0" (1.83 m)	205 lb (93 kg)	2000-02-28	Naperville, Illinois	Notre Dame (Big Ten)	NYI, 103rd overall 2018
48	(United States)	Davis Pennington	Sophomore	D	5' 10" (1.78 m)	180 lb (82 kg)	2001-05-27	Saline, Michigan	Muskegon Lumberjacks (USHL)	—

== Standings ==
2022–23 National Collegiate Hockey Conference Standings
	Conference record										Overall record					
	GP	W	L	T	OTW	OTL	SW	PTS	GF	GA	GP	W	L	T	GF	GA
#6 Denver †	24	19	5	0	2	1	0	56	94	53	40	30	10	0	150	86
#11 Western Michigan	24	15	8	1	2	0	0	44	86	60	39	23	15	1	148	102
#20 Omaha	24	13	9	2	2	2	1	42	71	64	37	19	15	3	109	97
#5 St. Cloud State *	24	12	9	3	2	1	3	41	85	68	41	25	13	3	133	95
Minnesota Duluth	24	10	14	0	1	4	0	33	65	81	37	16	20	1	95	114
#17 North Dakota	24	10	10	4	3	0	2	33	75	70	39	18	15	6	127	110
Colorado College	24	6	15	3	0	2	2	25	37	60	38	13	22	3	79	99
Miami	24	3	18	3	0	2	0	14	39	96	36	8	24	4	73	137
Championship: March 18, 2023 † indicates conference regular season champion (Penrose Cup) * indicates conference tournament champion (Frozen Faceoff Championship Trophy); Rankings: USCHO.com Top 20 Poll

== Schedule and results ==
Date	Time	Opponent^{#}	Rank^{#}	Site	TV	Decision	Result	Attendance	Record
Exhibition
October 1	6:07 PM	#3 Minnesota State*		Baxter Arena • Omaha, Nebraska (Exhibition)		Kucharski	W 7–2	4,597	
Regular Season
October 7	7:07 PM	Niagara*		Baxter Arena • Omaha, Nebraska		Kucharski	L 3–4	5,748	0–1–0
October 8	7:07 PM	Niagara*		Baxter Arena • Omaha, Nebraska		Latkoczy	L 3–4	5,567	0–2–0
October 14	6:07 PM	at Lake Superior State*		Taffy Abel Arena • Sault Ste. Marie, Michigan	FloHockey	Kucharski	W 3–1	1,654	1–2–0
October 15	5:07 PM	at Lake Superior State*		Taffy Abel Arena • Sault Ste. Marie, Michigan	FloHockey	Kucharski	T 4–4 ^{OT}	1,444	1–2–1
October 21	7:07 PM	Alaska*		Baxter Arena • Omaha, Nebraska		Kucharski	L 2–3 ^{OT}	6,414	1–3–1
October 23	2:07 PM	Alaska*		Baxter Arena • Omaha, Nebraska		Latkoczy	W 3–2 ^{OT}	4,697	2–3–1
October 28	6:45 PM	at Long Island*		Northwell Health Ice Center • East Meadow, New York	ESPN+	Kucharski	W 2–1	738	3–3–1
October 29	6:07 PM	at Long Island*		Northwell Health Ice Center • East Meadow, New York	ESPN+	Latkoczy	W 7–1	300	4–3–1
November 4	7:07 PM	#10 North Dakota		Baxter Arena • Omaha, Nebraska	Midco	Kucharski	L 1–4	6,543	4–4–1 (0–1–0)
November 5	7:07 PM	#10 North Dakota		Baxter Arena • Omaha, Nebraska	Midco	Kucharski	T 3–3 ^{SOW}	6,314	4–4–2 (0–1–1)
November 11	7:00 PM	at #20 Minnesota Duluth		AMSOIL Arena • Duluth, Minnesota	MY9	Kucharski	W 3–2	5,941	5–4–2 (1–1–1)
November 12	6:00 PM	at #20 Minnesota Duluth		AMSOIL Arena • Duluth, Minnesota	MY9	Kucharski	L 2–3 ^{OT}	6,103	5–5–2 (1–2–1)
November 25	8:00 PM	at #1 Denver		Magness Arena • Denver, Colorado		Kucharski	W 3–0	5,689	6–5–2 (2–2–1)
November 26	7:00 PM	at #1 Denver		Magness Arena • Denver, Colorado		Kucharski	L 3–6	5,269	6–6–2 (2–3–1)
December 2	7:07 PM	#14 Western Michigan		Baxter Arena • Omaha, Nebraska		Kucharski	W 7–6	6,623	7–6–2 (3–3–1)
December 3	7:07 PM	#14 Western Michigan		Baxter Arena • Omaha, Nebraska		Latkoczy	W 3–1	6,766	8–6–2 (4–3–1)
December 9	8:30 PM	at Colorado College		Ed Robson Arena • Colorado Springs, Colorado	ATTRM	Kucharski	L 4–6	3,409	8–7–2 (4–4–1)
December 10	7:00 PM	at Colorado College		Ed Robson Arena • Colorado Springs, Colorado		Latkoczy	L 0–1	3,416	8–8–2 (4–5–1)
December 30	7:07 PM	St. Lawrence*		Baxter Arena • Omaha, Nebraska		Kucharski	L 1–2	7,347	8–9–2
December 31	8:07 PM	St. Lawrence*		Baxter Arena • Omaha, Nebraska		Latkoczy	W 5–2	5,817	9–9–2
January 13	7:07 PM	Minnesota Duluth		Baxter Arena • Omaha, Nebraska	CBSSN	Kucharski	W 3–2	6,398	10–9–2 (5–5–1)
January 14	7:07 PM	Minnesota Duluth		Baxter Arena • Omaha, Nebraska		Latkoczy	W 6–1	6,451	11–9–2 (6–5–1)
January 20	7:07 PM	Miami		Baxter Arena • Omaha, Nebraska		Kucharski	W 4–1	6,134	12–9–2 (7–5–1)
January 21	7:07 PM	Miami		Baxter Arena • Omaha, Nebraska		Latkoczy	W 2–0	6,650	13–9–2 (8–5–1)
January 27	6:00 PM	at #9 Western Michigan		Lawson Arena • Kalamazoo, Michigan		Kucharski	L 1–6	3,872	13–10–2 (8–6–1)
January 28	5:00 PM	at #9 Western Michigan		Lawson Arena • Kalamazoo, Michigan		Latkoczy	W 2–0	3,924	14–10–2 (9–6–1)
February 10	7:07 PM	Colorado College	#16	Baxter Arena • Omaha, Nebraska		Latkoczy	W 3–2	7,942	15–10–2 (10–6–1)
February 11	7:07 PM	Colorado College	#16	Baxter Arena • Omaha, Nebraska		Latkoczy	T 2–2 ^{SOL}	7,755	15–10–3 (10–6–2)
February 17	6:05 PM	at Miami	#15	Steve Cady Arena • Oxford, Ohio		Latkoczy	W 3–1	2,025	16–10–3 (11–6–2)
February 18	4:05 PM	at Miami	#15	Steve Cady Arena • Oxford, Ohio		Kucharski	W 3–2	2,573	17–10–3 (12–6–2)
February 24	7:07 PM	#6 St. Cloud State	#14	Baxter Arena • Omaha, Nebraska		Latkoczy	L 2–6	7,027	17–11–3 (12–7–2)
February 25	7:07 PM	#6 St. Cloud State	#14	Baxter Arena • Omaha, Nebraska		Latkoczy	W 6–2	7,802	18–11–3 (13–7–2)
March 3	7:07 PM	at North Dakota	#14	Ralph Engelstad Arena • Grand Forks, North Dakota	Midco	Latkoczy	L 4–5 ^{OT}	11,728	18–12–3 (13–8–2)
March 4	6:07 PM	at North Dakota	#14	Ralph Engelstad Arena • Grand Forks, North Dakota	Midco	Kucharski	L 1–2	11,731	18–13–3 (13–9–2)
NCHC Tournament
March 10	6:07 PM	North Dakota*	#17	Baxter Arena • Omaha, Nebraska (Quarterfinal Game 1)	Midco	Latkoczy	W 2–1	6,510	19–13–3
March 11	6:07 PM	North Dakota*	#17	Baxter Arena • Omaha, Nebraska (Quarterfinal Game 2)	Midco	Latkoczy	L 1–3	7,348	19–14–3
March 12	5:07 PM	North Dakota*	#17	Baxter Arena • Omaha, Nebraska (Quarterfinal Game 3)	Midco	Latkoczy	L 2–5	5,571	19–15–3
*Non-conference game. ^{#}Rankings from USCHO.com Poll. All times are in Central Time. Source:

== Scoring statistics ==
Name	Position	Games	Goals	Assists	Points	PIM
Jack Randl	LW	37	18	16	34	22
Tyler Weiss	C/LW	37	6	21	27	26
Jonny Tychonick	D	35	8	18	26	24
Matt Miller	RW	34	13	12	25	32
Ty Mueller	F	34	12	13	25	4
Cameron Berg	C	37	10	14	24	38
Jake Pivonka	C	37	10	8	18	16
Jacob Guévin	D	36	4	14	18	6
Davis Pennington	D	36	1	15	16	10
Nolan Sullivan	F	35	6	9	15	31
Joaquim Lemay	D	32	2	10	12	23
Jacob Slipec	F	28	5	4	9	8
Jimmy Glynn	F	30	4	5	9	18
Ray Fust	LW/RW	24	3	6	9	4
Nolan Krenzen	D	34	1	8	9	4
Kirby Proctor	D	37	1	7	8	30
Victor Mancini	D	32	0	8	8	10
Brock Bremer	LW	22	2	5	7	30
Tyler Rollwagen	F	33	1	3	4	14
Kaden Bohlsen	C	26	2	1	3	26
Cam Mitchell	LW	14	0	1	1	0
Jacob Zab	G	1	0	0	0	0
Griffin Ludtke	D	14	0	0	0	0
Michael Abgrall	C	15	0	0	0	16
Šimon Latkoczy	G	20	0	0	0	0
Jake Kucharski	G	20	0	0	0	0
Total			109	198	307	392

== Goaltending statistics ==
Name	Games	Minutes	Wins	Losses	Ties	Goals against	Saves	Shut outs	SV %	GAA
Jacob Zab	1	1:32	0	0	0	0	1	0	1.000	0.00
Šimon Latkoczy	20	1110:42	11	6	1	43	490	2	.919	2.32
Jake Kucharski	20	1123:14	8	9	2	51	481	1	.904	2.72
Empty Net	-	15:57	-	-	-	3	-	-	-	-
Total	38	2251:25	19	15	3	97	972	3	.909	2.59

== Rankings ==
Poll	Week																											
Poll	Pre	1	2	3	4	5	6	7	8	9	10	11	12	13	14	15	16	17	18	19	20	21	22	23	24	25	26	27 (Final)
USCHO.com	NR	-	NR	NR	NR	NR	NR	NR	NR	NR	NR	NR	NR	-	NR	NR	NR	NR	19	16	15	14	14	17	18	20	-	20
USA Today	NR	NR	NR	NR	NR	NR	NR	NR	NR	NR	NR	NR	NR	NR	NR	NR	NR	NR	16	16	15	15	14	18	19	NR	NR	NR

Note: USCHO did not release a poll in weeks 1, 13, or 26.

== Awards and honors ==
Player	Award	Ref
Joaquim Lemay	NCHC Rookie Team	
Jacob Guévin	NCHC Rookie Team	

== Players drafted into the NHL ==
=== 2023 NHL entry draft ===
Round	Pick	Player	NHL team
3	81	Tanner Ludtke ^{†}	Arizona Coyotes
4	105	Ty Mueller	Vancouver Canucks

† incoming freshman
