= Chris Bergeron =

Canadian ice hockey player

- Born: November 28, 1970 (age 55) Wallaceburg, Ontario, Canada
- Height: 5 ft 11 in (180 cm)
- Weight: 190 lb (86 kg; 13 st 8 lb)
- Position: Center
- Shot: Right
- National team: Canada
- NHL draft: undrafted
- Playing career: 1993–2000
- Coaching career

Playing career
- 1989–1993: Miami
- Position: Center

Coaching career (HC unless noted)
- 2000–2010: Miami (assistant)
- 2010–2019: Bowling Green
- 2019–2024: Miami

Head coaching record
- Overall: 206–270–60 (.440)
- Tournaments: 0–1 (.000)

Accomplishments and honors

Championships
- 1994 Riley Cup; 1998 Ray Miron President's Cup

Chris Bergeron (born November 28, 1970) is a Canadian retired professional ice hockey center, and the former men's ice hockey head coach at his alma mater, Miami University.

== Playing career ==
=== NCAA hockey ===
Bergeron played with the Miami RedHawks of the CCHA (NCAA Division I). Bergeron became an integral part of Miami squad, culminating in his senior 1992–93 season, when the team finished with a stellar 22-3-5 (.750) record and CCHA regular season title. Miami then capped a historic year for the program with its first bid to the NCAA men's ice hockey tournament. Miami was led by Bergeron (61 points), Brian Savage (2nd-Team All-American, 37 goals), defenseman Bobby Marshall (2nd-Team All American, 45 points) and goalie Richard Shulmistra (2.71 GAA). The team lost in the first round to Wisconsin 3–1 at the Joe Louis Arena in Detroit, Michigan. Bergeron was voted the best defensive forward in the CCHA for the 1992-93 season and turned professional with the completion of his collegiate career.

=== International ===
Following his college career at Miami, Bergeron joined teammate Brian Savage and saw action in four games with the Canadian National Team, recording a goal in four games with Canada.

=== Professional career ===
Bergeron played professionally with a number of teams in his 7 year professional career. In his first season, with the Toledo Storm, he recorded 20 points in 18 games and 10 points in 5 playoff games, helping the team to the ECHL Riley Cup championship.

He spent one season in the professional roller hockey league, during the summer of 1994 with Buffalo Stampede. Bergeron played in 20 game recording 19 goals, 34 assists and 46 penalty minutes in his first and only season playing professional roller hockey. Bergeron was second on the team in points and tied for third in goals, with the team winning the RHI championship Murphy Cup.

He returned to the ice for the 1994–95 season, primarily with the Birmingham Bulls of the ECHL, in a solid season (82 points, 27 goals, 55 assists). He spent time with the Cincinnati Cyclones for parts of four seasons, and put forward his best season in 1997–98 with the Columbus Cottonmouths of the Central Hockey League. Bergeon netted 65 goals and added 54 assists for 119 points in 65 regular season games with the Cottonmouths on their way to a CHL championship Levins Cup.

Bergeron finished his professional career in the 1999-2000 season with the Port Huron Border Cats of the United Hockey League.

== Career statistics ==
=== Playing career ===
GP = Games played; G = Goals; A = Assists; Pts = Points; PIM = Penalty minutes

			Regular season					Playoffs
Season	Team	League	GP	G	A	Pts	PIM	GP	G	A	Pts	PIM
1989–90	Miami University	NCAA	36	5	6	11	18	—	—	—	—	—
1990–91	Miami University	NCAA	26	9	3	12	26	—	—	—	—	—
1991–92	Miami University	NCAA	40	13	23	36	22	—	—	—	—	—
1992–93	Miami University	NCAA	41	21	40	61	54	—	—	—	—	—
1993–94	Toledo Storm	ECHL	18	10	10	20	26	5	7	3	10	2
1993–94	Adirondack Red Wings	AHL	41	6	5	11	37	1	0	0	0	0
1994–95	Birmingham Bulls	ECHL	53	27	55	82	128	7	4	8	12	2
1994–95	Cincinnati Cyclones	IHL	14	1	3	4	2	2	0	0	0	0
1995–96	Birmingham Bulls	ECHL	33	21	38	59	85	—	—	—	—	—
1995–96	Toledo Storm	ECHL	6	3	2	5	2	10	3	8	11	4
1995–96	Cincinnati Cyclones	IHL	25	3	2	5	8	1	0	0	0	0
1995–96	Carolina Monarchs	AHL	2	0	1	1	2	—	—	—	—	—
1996–97	Toledo Storm	ECHL	9	6	9	15	8	—	—	—	—	—
1996–97	Las Vegas Thunder	IHL	3	0	1	1	2	—	—	—	—	—
1996–97	Cincinnati Cyclones	IHL	62	7	18	25	68	1	0	1	1	0
1997–98	Columbus Cottonmouths	CHL	65	65	54	119	97	12	6	5	11	14
1997–98	Cincinnati Cyclones	IHL	6	1	0	1	2	—	—	—	—	—
1998–99	Port Huron Border Cats	UHL	53	26	43	69	18	7	3	1	4	4
1998–99	Cincinnati Cyclones	IHL	1	0	1	1	2	3	0	0	0	0
1999–00	Port Huron Border Cats	UHL	13	6	6	12	14	6	2	4	6	2
NCAA Totals			143	48	72	120	120	—	—	—	—	—
ECHL Totals			119	67	114	181	249	22	14	19	33	8
IHL Totals			111	12	25	37	84	7	0	1	1	0
AHL Totals			43	6	6	12	39	1	0	0	0	0

== Coaching career ==
In 2000, Bergeron retired from playing professional hockey and returned to his Alma Mater Miami University. He joined the RedHawks as an assistant coach for the 2000–01 season and spent the next 10 seasons with the RedHawks under former teammate and Miami head coach Enrico Blasi. During his time at Miami, Bergeron was part of eight 20-win seasons, including six NCAA Tournament appearances and a national championship game. Bergeron worked with the forwards, as well as being heavily involved in recruiting, bringing in six players who would become All-Americans and another player who would go on to win the Hobey Baker Award at Miami.

In 2010, Bergeron was hired as head coach at Bowling Green State University in Bowling Green, Ohio. Bergeron replaced interim head coach Denis Williams, who took over the struggling program in 2009 after Scott Paluch left to take a position with USA Hockey.

In 2014-15, Bergeron led the Falcons to their first 20+ win season since 1995-96, finishing with a record of 23-11-5. They wrapped up that season just .0001 PairWise points on the outside of the national tournament, where they were left out in favor of the eventual national champions that year, Providence.

In 2016-17, after high preseason expectations and sluggish start, he led Bowling Green as they rode a seven-game winning streak all the way to the program's first conference championship game appearance since the 1987-88 season. The Falcons fought valiantly before ultimately dropping the road contest in a hostile environment to Michigan Tech in double overtime, 3-2.

In 2017-18, his Bowling Green Falcons won the Great Lakes Invitational tournament. They triumphed over Michigan Wolverines 6-4 in the semifinals, and they defeated Michigan Tech 4-1 in the championship game, winning the event for the first time in history.

In 2018-19, Bowling Green had a hot stretch to start the season, highlighted by an 8-2 victory over a top-10 Ohio State in Columbus and culminating in finishing the first half of the season with a sweep of then #3 Minnesota State to go into the Christmas break with a 13-3-3 record. Despite their struggles with consistency down the stretch to close the regular season, the Falcons earned a bid to the 2019 NCAA Division I men's ice hockey tournament. They were selected as the 15th seed, which was the last at-large bid to make it into the tournament. Falcons supporters gathered for a "watch party" for the selection show inside the Slater Family Ice Arena as BG earned their first NCAA bid in 29 years. Bowling Green lost 2-1 in overtime to eventual national champions Minnesota-Duluth in the first round.

On April 5, 2019, Bergeron was named the head hockey coach at Miami University, leaving Bowling Green as the 2nd-winningest coach in program history, with 171 wins.

On March 18, 2024 Bergeron was fired as the head hockey coach at Miami University, leaving with an overall record of 35-116-16. The final season of Bergeron's tenure finished with a 0-15-1 record in his final 16 games.

=== Head coaching record ===
Record table
Season	Team	Overall	Conference	Standing	Postseason
Bowling Green Falcons (CCHA) (2010–2013)
2010–11	Bowling Green	10–27–4	3–21–4–2	11th	CCHA Quarterfinals
2011–12	Bowling Green	14–25–5	5–19–4–3	11th	CCHA Third Place Game
2012–13	Bowling Green	15–21–5	10–15–3–1	9th	CCHA Quarterfinals
Bowling Green:		39–73–14	18–55–11–6		
Bowling Green Falcons (WCHA) (2013–2019)
2013–14	Bowling Green	18–15–6	13–11–4	t-3rd	WCHA Semifinals
2014–15	Bowling Green	23–11–5	17–8–3	3rd	WCHA Semifinals
2015–16	Bowling Green	22–14–6	16–7–5	3rd	WCHA Semifinals
2016–17	Bowling Green	21–18–2	14–13–1	4th	WCHA Runner-Up
2017–18	Bowling Green	23–12–6	17–6–5	3rd	WCHA Semifinals
2018–19	Bowling Green	25–11–5	16–8–4	3rd	NCAA Midwest Regional Semifinals
Bowling Green:		132–81–30	93–53–22		
Miami RedHawks (NCHC) (2019–2014)
2019–20	Miami	8–21–5	5–16–3–2	7th	Tournament Cancelled
2020–21	Miami	5–18–2	5–17–2	8th	NCHC Quarterfinals
2021–22	Miami	7–27–2	4–19–1	8th	NCHC Quarterfinals
2022–23	Miami	8–24–4	3–18–3	8th	NCHC Quarterfinals
2023–24	Miami	7–26–3	1–21–2	8th	NCHC Quarterfinals
Miami:		35–116–16	18–92–11		
Total:		206–270–60			
National champion Postseason invitational champion Conference regular season champion Conference regular season and conference tournament champion Division regular season champion Division regular season and conference tournament champion Conference tournament champion

Awards and achievements
Preceded by Pat Ferschweiler	CCHA Best Defensive Forward; 1992–93	Succeeded by Mike Stone
