= 2022–23 Miami RedHawks men's ice hockey season =

- Conference: 8th NCHC
- Home ice: Steve Cady Arena

Rankings
- USCHO: NR
- USA Today: NR

Record
- Overall: 8–24–4
- Conference: 3–18–3
- Home: 3–13–2
- Road: 5–11–2

Coaches and captains
- Head coach: Chris Bergeron
- Assistant coaches: Barry Schutte; Zack Cisek
- Captain: Jack Clement

The 2022–23 Miami RedHawks men's ice hockey season was the 45th season of play for the program and the 10th in the NCHC conference. The RedHawks represented Miami University and were coached by Chris Bergeron, in his 4th season.

== Season ==
By any measure, Miami had a terrible season in 2023. While the defense saw a moderate improvement and allowed more than 100 fewer shots against, any boost the team may have gotten from that was erased by the RedHawks' paltry offense. The loss of several top scorers from '22 could not be replaced and just a single player, Matthew Barbolini, managed to score more than 15 points. Miami scored 21 fewer goals than they had the year before, averaging just over 2 goals per game. Only three teams in the nation (Lake Superior State, Vermont and Yale) had a worse time scoring than Miami while just one (Lindenwood) had more trouble keeping the puck out of the net. Even with the minute strides on the defensive side, the RedHawks still had the worst goal differential in the nation at -64, which translated into approximately 1.8 goals per game in the red.

To make matters worse, all of this bad news came after a decent start to the season. Miami kicked the year off with a 4–1–1 record with Ludvig Persson playing very well in goal. However, as soon as the team began its conference schedule, their results turned sour. The RedHawks went 1–9–1 over an extended stretch but began to show a bit of life in December. They managed to take down #4 St. Cloud State just before the winter break and then return with a win over Niagara. The 5 goals they scored in each of those games got them within shouting distance of .500 but the team completely collapsed afterwards.

Miami won just a single match after January 1 and were shutout in 5 of their last 16 games. This was the fourth consecutive season in which the RedHawks failed to win at least 10 games.

== Departures ==
Player	Position	Nationality	Cause
Matt Barry	Forward	United States	Graduation (signed with Orlando Solar Bears)
Scott Corbett	Forward	Canada	Graduation (retired)
Bray Crowder	Defenseman	Canada	Graduation (signed with Florida Everblades)
Derek Daschke	Defenseman	United States	Graduate transfer to Minnesota Duluth
Monte Graham	Forward	United States	Graduation (retired)
Chase Gresock	Forward	United States	Graduate transfer to Bowling Green
Kirk Laursen	Goaltender	United States	Transferred to Western Michigan
Michael Regush	Forward	Canada	Graduation (signed with Florida Everblades)
Caleb Rule	Forward	United States	Left program (retired)
Andrew Sinard	Defenseman	United States	Graduation (retired)

== Recruiting ==
Player	Position	Nationality	Age	Notes
Frankie Carogioiello	Defenseman	Canada	20	Woodbridge, ON
Zane Demsey	Defenseman	United States	20	Harrison Township, MI
Max Dukovac	Forward	United States	20	Aurora, IL
Michael Feenstra	Defenseman	United States	21	Grand Haven, MI
William Hallén	Forward	Sweden	20	Gothenburg, SWE
Axel Kumlin	Defenseman	Sweden	20	Stockholm, SWE
Carter McPhail	Goaltender	United States	23	Fenton, MI; transfer from Ferris State
Blake Mesenburg	Forward	United States	20	Orono, MN
Artur Turansky	Forward	Slovakia	21	Bratislava, SVK
John Waldron	Forward	United States	19	Batavia, IL

== Roster ==
As of June 30, 2022.

No.	Nat.	Player	Class	Pos	Height	Weight	DoB	Hometown	Previous team	NHL rights
3	(Sweden)	Axel Kumlin	Freshman	D	6' 1" (1.85 m)	185 lb (84 kg)	2002-02-23	Stockholm, Sweden	Dubuque (USHL)	—
4	(United States)	Michael Feenstra	Freshman	D	6' 3" (1.91 m)	195 lb (88 kg)	2001-04-03	Grand Haven, Michigan	Dubuque (USHL)	—
5	(United States)	Jack Clement (C)	Senior	D	6' 4" (1.93 m)	200 lb (91 kg)	1999-06-09	Detroit, Michigan	Des Moines (USHL)	—
7	(United States)	Robby Drazner	Junior	D	6' 1" (1.85 m)	195 lb (88 kg)	2000-02-13	Buffalo Grove, Illinois	Nanaimo (BCHL)	—
8	(United States)	P. J. Fletcher	Junior	F	6' 2" (1.88 m)	185 lb (84 kg)	2001-07-12	Dana Point, California	Dubuque (USHL)	—
9	(United States)	Jack Olmstead	Senior	F	5' 10" (1.78 m)	180 lb (82 kg)	1998-02-06	Troy, Michigan	Michigan (Big Ten)	—
10	(United States)	Zane Demsey	Freshman	D	6' 2" (1.88 m)	190 lb (86 kg)	2001-11-04	Harrison Township, Michigan	Dubuque (USHL)	—
11	(Sweden)	William Hallén	Freshman	F	6' 1" (1.85 m)	187 lb (85 kg)	2002-04-15	Gothenburg, Sweden	Dubuque (USHL)	—
12	(United States)	John Sladic	Senior	F	5' 8" (1.73 m)	165 lb (75 kg)	1998-01-22	Novi, Michigan	Aberdeen (NAHL)	—
13	(United States)	Max Dukovac	Freshman	F	6' 2" (1.88 m)	182 lb (83 kg)	2002-02-19	Aurora, Illinois	Langley (BCHL)	—
14	(United States)	Thomas Daskas	Junior	F	6' 2" (1.88 m)	200 lb (91 kg)	1999-09-03	Rochester, Michigan	Air Force (AHA)	—
15	(United States)	Nick Donato	Sophomore	D	6' 0" (1.83 m)	190 lb (86 kg)	2002-07-27	Lake Forest, Illinois	Tri-City (USHL)	—
16	(Sweden)	Hampus Rydqvist	Junior	D	5' 10" (1.78 m)	185 lb (84 kg)	1999-03-12	Gothenburg, Sweden	Maryland (NAHL)	—
17	(United States)	John Waldron	Freshman	F	6' 1" (1.85 m)	185 lb (84 kg)	2002-11-13	Batavia, Illinois	Waterloo (USHL)	—
18	(Canada)	Frankie Carogioiello	Freshman	F	5' 10" (1.78 m)	173 lb (78 kg)	2002-06-21	Woodbridge, Ontario	Chilliwack (BCHL)	—
19	(United States)	Red Savage	Sophomore	F	5' 11" (1.8 m)	185 lb (84 kg)	2003-05-15	Scottsdale, Arizona	NTDP (USHL)	DET, 114th overall 2021
20	(United States)	Michael Holland	Junior	F	6' 1" (1.85 m)	195 lb (88 kg)	1999-11-23	Charlotte, North Carolina	Boston Jr. Bruins (NCDC)	—
21	(United States)	Ryan Savage	Senior	F	5' 11" (1.8 m)	180 lb (82 kg)	2000-03-31	Scottsdale, Arizona	Muskegon (USHL)	—
22	(United States)	Joe Cassetti	Senior	F	6' 4" (1.93 m)	205 lb (93 kg)	1999-02-28	Pleasanton, California	Waterloo (USHL)	—
23	(United States)	Brian Silver	Junior	F	5' 10" (1.78 m)	180 lb (82 kg)	2000-11-06	Lake Bluff, Illinois	Omaha (USHL)	—
24	(United States)	Alex Murray	Sophomore	D	5' 11" (1.8 m)	183 lb (83 kg)	2000-03-17	Glenview, Illinois	Lone Star (NAHL)	—
25	(Slovakia)	Artur Turanský	Freshman	F	5' 11" (1.8 m)	176 lb (80 kg)	2001-07-12	Bratislava, Slovakia	Lone Star (NAHL)	—
26	(United States)	Blake Mesenburg	Freshman	F	5' 11" (1.8 m)	183 lb (83 kg)	2002-06-05	Orono, Minnesota	St. Cloud (NAHL)	—
27	(United States)	Dylan Moulton	Junior	D	6' 2" (1.88 m)	199 lb (90 kg)	2001-04-24	Nolensville, Tennessee	Green Bay (USHL)	—
28	(United States)	Chase Pletzke	Senior	F	5' 11" (1.8 m)	175 lb (79 kg)	2000-04-10	Bay City, Michigan	Langley (BCHL)	—
29	(United States)	Matthew Barbolini	Junior	F	6' 2" (1.88 m)	205 lb (93 kg)	2000-06-01	Williamsville, New York	Lincoln (USHL)	—
31	(United States)	Logan Neaton	Senior	G	6' 4" (1.93 m)	200 lb (91 kg)	1999-04-07	Brighton, Michigan	UMass Lowell (HEA)	WPG, 144th overall 2019
32	(Sweden)	Ludvig Persson	Junior	G	6' 1" (1.85 m)	184 lb (83 kg)	1999-10-06	Hindås, Sweden	Lone Star (NAHL)	—
33	(United States)	Carter McPhail	Senior	G	5' 11" (1.8 m)	178 lb (81 kg)	1998-12-04	Fenton, Michigan	Ferris State (CCHA)	—
34	(Canada)	Alec Capstick	Senior	D	6' 2" (1.88 m)	200 lb (91 kg)	1999-02-18	Langley, British Columbia	Langley (BCHL)	—

== Standings ==
2022–23 National Collegiate Hockey Conference Standings
	Conference record										Overall record					
	GP	W	L	T	OTW	OTL	SW	PTS	GF	GA	GP	W	L	T	GF	GA
#6 Denver †	24	19	5	0	2	1	0	56	94	53	40	30	10	0	150	86
#11 Western Michigan	24	15	8	1	2	0	0	44	86	60	39	23	15	1	148	102
#20 Omaha	24	13	9	2	2	2	1	42	71	64	37	19	15	3	109	97
#5 St. Cloud State *	24	12	9	3	2	1	3	41	85	68	41	25	13	3	133	95
Minnesota Duluth	24	10	14	0	1	4	0	33	65	81	37	16	20	1	95	114
#17 North Dakota	24	10	10	4	3	0	2	33	75	70	39	18	15	6	127	110
Colorado College	24	6	15	3	0	2	2	25	37	60	38	13	22	3	79	99
Miami	24	3	18	3	0	2	0	14	39	96	36	8	24	4	73	137
Championship: March 18, 2023 † indicates conference regular season champion (Penrose Cup) * indicates conference tournament champion (Frozen Faceoff Championship Trophy); Rankings: USCHO.com Top 20 Poll

== Schedule and results ==
Date	Time	Opponent^{#}	Rank^{#}	Site	TV	Decision	Result	Attendance	Record
Regular Season
October 1	5:05 PM	Ferris State*		Steve Cady Arena • Oxford, Ohio		Persson	T 2–2 ^{OT}	2,805	0–0–1
October 2	3:05 PM	Ferris State*		Steve Cady Arena • Oxford, Ohio		Persson	W 4–1	1,181	1–0–1
October 7	7:15 PM	at #15 Massachusetts Lowell*		Tsongas Center • Lowell, Massachusetts	ESPN+	Persson	W 3–1	4,225	2–0–1
October 8	6:05 PM	at #15 Massachusetts Lowell*		Tsongas Center • Lowell, Massachusetts	ESPN+	Persson	L 2–4	3,593	2–1–1
October 21	7:00 PM	at Canisius*		LECOM Harborcenter • Buffalo, New York	FloHockey	Persson	W 5–3	973	3–1–1
October 22	4:00 PM	at Canisius*		LECOM Harborcenter • Buffalo, New York	FloHockey	Persson	W 2–0	657	4–1–1
October 28	7:05 PM	#3 Denver		Steve Cady Arena • Oxford, Ohio		Persson	L 0–4	1,921	4–2–1 (0–1–0)
October 29	7:05 PM	#3 Denver		Steve Cady Arena • Oxford, Ohio		Persson	L 2–4	2,011	4–3–1 (0–2–0)
November 4	7:00 PM	at #18 Western Michigan		Lawson Arena • Kalamazoo, Michigan		Persson	L 1–7	3,053	4–4–1 (0–3–0)
November 5	6:00 PM	at #18 Western Michigan		Lawson Arena • Kalamazoo, Michigan		Persson	L 2–5	3,528	4–5–1 (0–4–0)
November 11	7:05 PM	Colorado College		Steve Cady Arena • Oxford, Ohio		Persson	T 1–1 ^{SOL}	1,978	4–5–2 (0–4–1)
November 12	7:05 PM	Colorado College		Steve Cady Arena • Oxford, Ohio		Persson	L 1–2	2,131	4–6–2 (0–5–1)
November 18	8:07 PM	at #19 North Dakota		Ralph Engelstad Arena • Grand Forks, North Dakota	Midco	Persson	L 1–7	10,823	4–7–2 (0–6–1)
November 19	7:07 PM	at #19 North Dakota		Ralph Engelstad Arena • Grand Forks, North Dakota	Midco	Persson	W 4–3	10,815	5–7–2 (1–6–1)
November 25	7:05 PM	#16 Michigan State*		Steve Cady Arena • Oxford, Ohio		Persson	L 3–5	1,429	5–8–2
November 26	5:05 PM	#16 Michigan State*		Steve Cady Arena • Oxford, Ohio		Neaton	L 0–4	1,422	5–9–2
December 9	7:05 PM	#4 St. Cloud State		Steve Cady Arena • Oxford, Ohio		Persson	L 3–7	1,213	5–10–2 (1–7–1)
December 10	5:05 PM	#4 St. Cloud State		Steve Cady Arena • Oxford, Ohio		Persson	W 5–0	1,169	6–10–2 (2–7–1)
December 30	7:05 PM	Niagara*		Steve Cady Arena • Oxford, Ohio		Persson	W 5–3	2,007	7–10–2
December 31	4:05 PM	Niagara*		Steve Cady Arena • Oxford, Ohio		Persson	L 4–5	1,254	7–11–2
January 13	9:00 PM	at #4 Denver		Magness Arena • Denver, Colorado		Persson	L 0–7	5,858	7–12–2 (2–8–1)
January 14	8:00 PM	at #4 Denver		Magness Arena • Denver, Colorado	Altitude 2	Persson	L 0–7	-	7–13–2 (2–9–1)
January 20	8:07 PM	at Omaha		Baxter Arena • Omaha, Nebraska		Persson	L 1–4	6,134	7–14–2 (2–10–1)
January 21	8:07 PM	at Omaha		Baxter Arena • Omaha, Nebraska		Neaton	L 0–2	6,650	7–15–2 (2–11–1)
January 27	7:05 PM	North Dakota		Steve Cady Arena • Oxford, Ohio	CBSSN	Persson	L 1–4	2,745	7–16–2 (2–12–1)
January 28	7:05 PM	North Dakota		Steve Cady Arena • Oxford, Ohio		Neaton	L 0–8	2,808	7–17–2 (2–13–1)
February 3	8:30 PM	at #5 St. Cloud State		Herb Brooks National Hockey Center • St. Cloud, Minnesota	FOX 9+	Persson	T 3–3 ^{SOL}	3,685	7–17–3 (2–13–2)
February 4	7:00 PM	at #5 St. Cloud State		Herb Brooks National Hockey Center • St. Cloud, Minnesota	FOX 9+	Persson	T 1–1 ^{SOL}	4,189	7–17–4 (2–13–3)
February 17	7:05 PM	#15 Omaha		Steve Cady Arena • Oxford, Ohio		Neaton	L 1–3	2,025	7–18–4 (2–14–3)
February 18	5:05 PM	#15 Omaha		Steve Cady Arena • Oxford, Ohio		Persson	L 2–3	2,573	7–19–4 (2–15–3)
February 24	8:00 PM	at Minnesota Duluth		AMSOIL Arena • Duluth, Minnesota	MY9	Persson	L 2–3	5,903	7–20–4 (2–16–3)
February 25	9:30 PM	at Minnesota Duluth		AMSOIL Arena • Duluth, Minnesota	MY9	Persson	W 4–1	5,590	8–20–4 (3–16–3)
March 3	7:05 PM	#8 Western Michigan		Steve Cady Arena • Oxford, Ohio		Persson	L 0–5	1,955	8–21–4 (3–17–3)
March 4	5:05 PM	#8 Western Michigan		Steve Cady Arena • Oxford, Ohio		Neaton	L 4–5 ^{OT}	2,486	8–22–4 (3–18–3)
NCHC Tournament
March 10	9:00 PM	at #3 Denver*		Magness Arena • Denver, Colorado (Quarterfinal Game 1)		Persson	L 2–6	4,873	8–23–4
March 11	8:00 PM	at #3 Denver*		Magness Arena • Denver, Colorado (Quarterfinal Game 2)		Persson	L 2–7	5,567	8–24–4
*Non-conference game. ^{#}Rankings from USCHO.com Poll. All times are in Eastern Time. Source:

== Scoring statistics ==
Name	Position	Games	Goals	Assists	Points	PIM
Matthew Barbolini	C	34	10	15	25	42
Joe Cassetti	LW	34	10	5	15	20
P. J. Fletcher	C/RW	36	5	10	15	22
Max Dukovac	F	31	1	14	15	27
John Waldron	F	29	9	5	14	16
Red Savage	C	32	7	7	14	24
Hampus Rydqvist	D	36	3	11	14	50
Axel Kumlin	D	32	2	8	11	19
Ryan Savage	RW	36	6	4	10	28
Artur Turansky	LW	32	4	2	6	6
Jack Clement	D	36	2	3	5	30
Dylan Moulton	D	32	1	4	5	18
William Hallén	C/LW	29	3	1	4	28
Jack Olmstead	F	23	2	2	4	10
Thomas Daskas	F	28	2	2	4	12
Frankie Carogioiello	C	22	0	4	4	8
Blake Mesenburg	C	25	2	1	3	12
Alex Murray	D	19	0	3	3	10
Zane Demsey	D	25	0	3	3	33
Robby Drazner	D	31	1	1	2	23
Nick Donato	D	20	0	2	2	6
John Sladic	F	7	1	0	1	0
Brian Silver	F	11	1	0	1	6
Logan Neaton	G	9	0	0	0	0
Michael Feenstra	D	20	0	0	0	2
Chase Pletzke	C	20	0	0	0	4
Ludvig Persson	G	32	0	0	0	2
Total			73	107	180	458

== Goaltending statistics ==
Name	Games	Minutes	Wins	Losses	Ties	Goals against	Saves	Shut outs	SV %	GAA
Logan Neaton	9	382:50	0	5	0	23	206	0	.900	3.60
Ludvig Persson	32	1783:25	8	19	4	109	891	2	.891	3.67
Empty Net	-	26:39	-	-	-	5	-	-	-	-
Total	36	2180:54	8	24	4	137	1097	2	.889	3.77

== Rankings ==
Poll	Week																											
Poll	Pre	1	2	3	4	5	6	7	8	9	10	11	12	13	14	15	16	17	18	19	20	21	22	23	24	25	26	27 (Final)
USCHO.com	NR	-	NR	NR	NR	NR	NR	NR	NR	NR	NR	NR	NR	-	NR	NR	NR	NR	NR	NR	NR	NR	NR	NR	NR	NR	-	NR
USA Today	NR	NR	NR	NR	NR	NR	NR	NR	NR	NR	NR	NR	NR	NR	NR	NR	NR	NR	NR	NR	NR	NR	NR	NR	NR	NR	NR	NR

Note: USCHO did not release a poll in weeks 1, 13, or 26.

== Players drafted into the NHL ==
=== 2023 NHL entry draft ===
Round	Pick	Player	NHL team
7	214	Casper Nassen ^{†}	Boston Bruins

† incoming freshman
