= 2022–23 Minnesota Duluth Bulldogs men's ice hockey season =

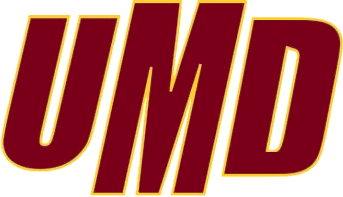
- Conference: T–5th NCHC
- Home ice: AMSOIL Arena

Rankings
- USCHO: NR
- USA Today: NR

Record
- Overall: 16–20–1
- Conference: 10–14–0
- Home: 10–9–0
- Road: 6–11–1

Coaches and captains
- Head coach: Scott Sandelin
- Assistant coaches: Adam Krause; Cody Chupp; Brant Nicklin
- Captain: Tanner Laderoute
- Alternate captain(s): Luke Loheit; Quinn Olson

The 2022–23 Minnesota Duluth Bulldogs men's ice hockey season was the 79th season of play for the program and 10th in the NCHC. The Bulldogs represented the University of Minnesota Duluth in the 2022–23 NCAA Division I men's ice hockey season were coached by Scott Sandelin in his 23rd season and played their home games at AMSOIL Arena.

== Season ==
The season brought significant roster turnover, particularly on the defense. Four of their six regulars on the blue line were gone, as was last year's starting goalie (Ryan Fanti) and four of their top six scorers. Coach Sandelin brought in a large recruiting class led by future first-round pick Isaac Howard to fill the open positions. Despite the uncertainty, UMD was expected to continue its high level of play.

The team was limited from the start of the season when sophomore forward Kyler Kleven suffered an injury in training camp and ended up missing the entire season. Blake Biondi had led the Bulldogs in goals the year before but came into the season nursing a shoulder injury. He got through the first half of the year scoring 3 goals in 17 games before injuring his shoulder again in early December. Biondi ended up having surgery on both shoulders and missed the remainder of the year. Freshman Ben Steeves filled in and led the team with 21 goals, however, he was the only consistent scoring threat that the Bulldogs had.

The newcomers on the blue line played well, but not quite up to the same standards to which the Bulldogs had grown accustomed. The goaltending became a weakness for the team; neither Zach Stejskal nor grad transfer Matthew Thiessen played well and the decline in the crease caused Duluth problems.

After opening the season with victories against Arizona State, UMD got swept in the second weekend against the previous year's national runner-up, Minnesota State. The team's situation grew dire after the following week when they dropped both games at home to Wisconsin, the worst team in the Big Ten. Duluth found itself at the bottom of the polls with an underperforming roster. The Bulldogs were able to stop their slide by taking advantage of Cornell in the Big Red's season debut. Duluth earned a split in four consecutive weeks, however, they faced Colorado College in two separate weekends. The Tigers were one of the weakest teams in the NCHC but shut out Duluth twice. By the beginning of December the team sunk further down the national rankings.

The team alternated wins and losses in the second half of the season and, though they won over some strong teams, they weren't able to get above .500. Entering postseason play, UMD had no chance to make the national tournament without first winning the NCHC tournament. While the team had go on the road in the quarterfinals, they played St. Cloud State. While the Huskies were already tournament-bound, UMD had taken three out of four meetings between the two during the year. St. Cloud won the first match 3-1; in the second, Zach Stejskal stopped 30 shots in the final two periods to lead the Bulldogs to a win. In the deciding game, it began similar to the first with neither team scoring in the opening period. Luke Loheit's 8th goal of the season gave UMD a lead early in the second, but the Huskies fired 21 shots in the middle frame and scored three times. Duluth's offense wasn't able to overcome the deficit and the Bulldogs' season came to a close.

== Departures ==
Player	Position	Nationality	Cause
Ben Almquist	Forward	United States	Transferred to Alaska Anchorage
Matt Anderson	Defenseman	United States	Graduation (signed with South Carolina Stingrays)
Koby Bender	Forward	United States	Graduation (signed with Bridgeport Islanders)
Noah Cates	Forward	United States	Graduation (signed with Philadelphia Flyers)
Ryan Fanti	Goaltender	Canada	Signed professional contract (Edmonton Oilers)
Casey Gilling	Forward	United States	Graduation (signed with Esbjerg Energy)
Connor Kelley	Defenseman	United States	Transferred to Providence
Jarrett Lee	Forward	United States	Graduate transfer to St. Thomas
Hunter Lellig	Defenseman	United States	Graduate transfer to Bowling Green
Brady Meyer	Forward	United States	Left program (retired)
Ben Patt	Goaltender	Canada	Graduation (retired)
Louie Roehl	Defenseman	United States	Graduation (signed with Wheeling Nailers)
Kobe Roth	Forward	United States	Graduation (retired)
Jake Rosenbaum	Defenseman	United States	Graduate transfer to American International

== Recruiting ==
Player	Position	Nationality	Age	Notes
Kyle Bettens	Forward	Canada	21	Winnipeg, MB
Riley Bodnarchuk	Defenseman	Canada	21	Okotoks, AB
Derek Daschke	Defenseman	United States	24	Troy, MI; graduate transfer from Miami
Aiden Dubinsky	Defenseman	United States	18	Highland Park, IL
Isaac Howard	Forward	United States	18	Hudson, WI; selected 31st overall in 2022
Luke Johnson	Forward	United States	20	St. Cloud, MN
Joseph Pierce	Defenseman	United States	19	Ely, MN
Zachary Sandy	Goaltender	United States	19	Fargo, ND
Jack Smith	Forward	United States	20	St. Cloud, MN; selected 102nd overall in 2020
Cole Spicer	Forward	United States	18	Grand Forks, ND; selected 117th overall in 2022
Ben Steeves	Forward	United States	20	Bedford, NH
Matthew Thiessen	Goaltender	Canada	22	Steinbach, MB; transfer from Maine; selected 192nd overall in 2018

== Roster ==
As of July 28, 2022.

No.	Nat.	Player	Class	Pos	Height	Weight	DoB	Hometown	Previous team	NHL rights
2	(United States)	Darian Gotz	Junior	D	5' 11" (1.8 m)	189 lb (86 kg)	2000-10-19	Hermantown, Minnesota	Cedar Rapids (USHL)	—
3	(United States)	Isaac Howard	Freshman	F	5' 10" (1.78 m)	182 lb (83 kg)	2004-03-30	Hudson, Wisconsin	NTDP (USHL)	TBL, 31st overall 2022
5	(United States)	Wyatt Kaiser	Junior	D	6' 0" (1.83 m)	183 lb (83 kg)	2002-07-31	Ham Lake, Minnesota	Andover (USHS–MN)	CHI, 81st overall 2020
6	(United States)	Ben Steeves	Freshman	F	5' 9" (1.75 m)	167 lb (76 kg)	2002-05-10	Bedford, New Hampshire	Sioux City (USHL)	—
7	(United States)	Blake Biondi	Junior	F	6' 0" (1.83 m)	181 lb (82 kg)	2002-04-24	Hermantown, Minnesota	Hermantown (USHS–MN)	MTL, 109th overall 2020
8	(United States)	Jesse Jacques	Graduate	F	6' 2" (1.88 m)	200 lb (91 kg)	1998-09-10	Hermantown, Minnesota	Green Bay (USHL)	—
10	(United States)	Derek Daschke	Graduate	D	6' 2" (1.88 m)	195 lb (88 kg)	1998-01-06	Troy, Michigan	Miami (NCHC)	—
11	(United States)	Cole Spicer	Freshman	F	5' 11" (1.8 m)	175 lb (79 kg)	2004-06-13	Grand Forks, North Dakota	NTDP (USHL)	BOS, 117th overall 2022
12	(United States)	Jack Smith	Freshman	F	5' 11" (1.8 m)	183 lb (83 kg)	2002-07-06	St. Cloud, Minnesota	Sioux Falls (USHL)	MTL, 102nd overall 2020
13	(Canada)	Tanner Laderoute (C)	Graduate	F	6' 0" (1.83 m)	190 lb (86 kg)	1997-06-04	Edmonton, Alberta	Okotoks (AJHL)	—
15	(Canada)	Quinn Olson (A)	Senior	F	5' 11" (1.8 m)	170 lb (77 kg)	2001-05-09	Calgary, Alberta	Okotoks (AJHL)	BOS, 92nd overall 2019
16	(United States)	Luke Loheit (A)	Senior	F	6' 1" (1.85 m)	195 lb (88 kg)	2000-07-26	Minnetonka, Minnesota	Penticton (BCHL)	OTT, 194th overall 2018
17	(United States)	Dominic James	Sophomore	F	5' 11" (1.8 m)	165 lb (75 kg)	2002-07-03	Plymouth, Michigan	Lincoln (USHL)	CHI, 173rd overall 2022
18	(United States)	Joey Pierce	Freshman	D	6' 0" (1.83 m)	208 lb (94 kg)	2002-10-02	Ely, Minnesota	Lincoln (USHL)	—
19	(Canada)	Riley Bodnarchuk	Freshman	D	6' 3" (1.91 m)	195 lb (88 kg)	2001-06-01	Okotoks, Alberta	Okotoks (AJHL)	—
20	(United States)	Owen Gallatin	Sophomore	D	5' 8" (1.73 m)	170 lb (77 kg)	2002-06-17	Hugo, Minnesota	Fargo (USHL)	—
21	(Canada)	Luke Mylymok	Junior	F	5' 11" (1.8 m)	183 lb (83 kg)	2001-09-29	Wilcox, Saskatchewan	Salmon Arm (BCHL)	—
22	(United States)	Kyler Kleven	Sophomore	F	6' 0" (1.83 m)	170 lb (77 kg)	2000-10-12	Moorhead, Minnesota	Waterloo (USHL)	—
23	(United States)	Will Francis	Sophomore	D	6' 5" (1.96 m)	207 lb (94 kg)	2000-11-16	St. Paul, Minnesota	Cedar Rapids (USHL)	ANA, 163rd overall 2019
24	(Canada)	Kyle Bettens	Freshman	F	6' 3" (1.91 m)	215 lb (98 kg)	2001-07-04	Winnipeg, Manitoba	Youngstown (USHL)	—
28	(United States)	Aiden Dubinsky	Freshman	D	6' 0" (1.83 m)	185 lb (84 kg)	2004-04-28	Highland Park, Illinois	Tri-City (USHL)	—
31	(United States)	Zach Sandy	Freshman	G	6' 0" (1.83 m)	177 lb (80 kg)	2002-12-07	Fargo, North Dakota	Minot (NAHL)	—
33		Carter Loney	Sophomore	F	5' 10" (1.78 m)	161 lb (73 kg)	2002-08-02	Columbus, Ohio	Sioux City (USHL)	—
35	(United States)	Zach Stejskal	Junior	G	6' 4" (1.93 m)	215 lb (98 kg)	1999-12-20	Cohasset, Minnesota	Wilkes-Barre/Scranton (NAHL)	—
36	(Canada)	Matthew Thiessen	Senior	G	6' 2" (1.88 m)	214 lb (97 kg)	2000-06-09	Steinbach, Manitoba	Maine (HEA)	VAN, 192nd overall 2018
37	(United States)	Luke Johnson	Freshman	F	5' 10" (1.78 m)	167 lb (76 kg)	2001-10-15	St. Cloud, Minnesota	Lincoln (USHL)	—

== Standings ==
2022–23 National Collegiate Hockey Conference Standings
	Conference record										Overall record					
	GP	W	L	T	OTW	OTL	SW	PTS	GF	GA	GP	W	L	T	GF	GA
#6 Denver †	24	19	5	0	2	1	0	56	94	53	40	30	10	0	150	86
#11 Western Michigan	24	15	8	1	2	0	0	44	86	60	39	23	15	1	148	102
#20 Omaha	24	13	9	2	2	2	1	42	71	64	37	19	15	3	109	97
#5 St. Cloud State *	24	12	9	3	2	1	3	41	85	68	41	25	13	3	133	95
Minnesota Duluth	24	10	14	0	1	4	0	33	65	81	37	16	20	1	95	114
#17 North Dakota	24	10	10	4	3	0	2	33	75	70	39	18	15	6	127	110
Colorado College	24	6	15	3	0	2	2	25	37	60	38	13	22	3	79	99
Miami	24	3	18	3	0	2	0	14	39	96	36	8	24	4	73	137
Championship: March 18, 2023 † indicates conference regular season champion (Penrose Cup) * indicates conference tournament champion (Frozen Faceoff Championship Trophy); Rankings: USCHO.com Top 20 Poll

== Schedule and results ==
Date	Time	Opponent^{#}	Rank^{#}	Site	TV	Decision	Result	Attendance	Record
Regular Season
October 1	6:00 PM	Arizona State*	#5	AMSOIL Arena • Duluth, Minnesota	MY9	Stejskal	W 3–2 ^{OT}	5,910	1–0–0
October 2	4:00 PM	Arizona State*	#5	AMSOIL Arena • Duluth, Minnesota	MY9	Thiessen	W 4–1	5,153	2–0–0
October 14	7:07 PM	at #5 Minnesota State*	#4	Mayo Clinic Health System Event Center • Mankato, Minnesota	KEYC	Stejskal	L 0–6	4,612	2–1–0
October 15	6:07 PM	at #5 Minnesota State*	#4	Mayo Clinic Health System Event Center • Mankato, Minnesota	KEYC	Stejskal	L 1–2	5,039	2–2–0
October 21	7:00 PM	Wisconsin*	#10	AMSOIL Arena • Duluth, Minnesota	MY9	Stejskal	L 2–5	6,573	2–3–0
October 22	6:00 PM	Wisconsin*	#10	AMSOIL Arena • Duluth, Minnesota	MY9	Thiessen	L 0–3	7,038	2–4–0
October 28	7:00 PM	#20 Cornell*	#19	AMSOIL Arena • Duluth, Minnesota	MY9	Stejskal	W 3–2	4,158	3–4–0
October 29	7:00 PM	#20 Cornell*	#19	AMSOIL Arena • Duluth, Minnesota	MY9	Stejskal	W 4–2	4,395	4–4–0
November 4	8:30 PM	at Colorado College	#19	Ed Robson Arena • Colorado Springs, Colorado	ATTRM	Stejskal	L 0–5	3,411	4–5–0 (0–1–0)
November 5	7:00 PM	at Colorado College	#19	Ed Robson Arena • Colorado Springs, Colorado		Thiessen	W 3–1	3,412	5–5–0 (1–1–0)
November 11	7:00 PM	Omaha	#20	AMSOIL Arena • Duluth, Minnesota	MY9	Thiessen	L 2–3	5,941	5–6–0 (1–2–0)
November 12	6:00 PM	Omaha	#20	AMSOIL Arena • Duluth, Minnesota	MY9	Thiessen	W 3–2 ^{OT}	6,103	6–6–0 (2–2–0)
November 18	6:00 PM	at #14 Western Michigan		Lawson Arena • Kalamazoo, Michigan		Thiessen	W 5–4	2,753	7–6–0 (3–2–0)
November 19	5:00 PM	at #14 Western Michigan		Lawson Arena • Kalamazoo, Michigan		Thiessen	L 3–5	3,294	7–7–0 (3–3–0)
December 2	7:00 PM	Colorado College		AMSOIL Arena • Duluth, Minnesota	ATTRM, MY9	Thiessen	L 0–3	6,184	7–8–0 (3–4–0)
December 3	7:00 PM	Colorado College		AMSOIL Arena • Duluth, Minnesota	MY9	Thiessen	W 4–0	5,794	8–8–0 (4–4–0)
December 9	7:00 PM	#1 Denver		AMSOIL Arena • Duluth, Minnesota	MY9	Thiessen	L 2–3	6,487	8–9–0 (4–5–0)
December 10	7:00 PM	#1 Denver		AMSOIL Arena • Duluth, Minnesota	MY9	Thiessen	L 3–4 ^{OT}	6,354	8–10–0 (4–6–0)
December 31	2:00 PM	St. Thomas*		AMSOIL Arena • Duluth, Minnesota (Exhibition)	MY9	Thiessen	W 2–1	5,746	
January 6	7:07 PM	at Bemidji State*		Sanford Center • Bemidji, Minnesota	FloHockey	Stejskal	T 1–1 ^{OT}	2,136	8–10–1
January 7	6:07 PM	Bemidji State*		AMSOIL Arena • Duluth, Minnesota	MY9	Stejskal	W 5–2	5,821	9–10–1
January 13	7:07 PM	at Omaha		Baxter Arena • Omaha, Nebraska	CBSSN	Stejskal	L 2–3	6,398	9–11–1 (4–7–0)
January 14	7:07 PM	at Omaha		Baxter Arena • Omaha, Nebraska		Stejskal	L 1–6	6,451	9–12–1 (4–8–0)
January 20	7:07 PM	at North Dakota		Ralph Engelstad Arena • Grand Forks, North Dakota	Midco	Thiessen	L 2–4	11,643	9–13–1 (4–9–0)
January 21	6:07 PM	at North Dakota		Ralph Engelstad Arena • Grand Forks, North Dakota	Midco	Stejskal	W 2–1	11,773	10–13–1 (5–9–0)
January 27	7:00 PM	#1 St. Cloud State		AMSOIL Arena • Duluth, Minnesota	MY9	Thiessen	W 3–5	6,579	11–13–1 (6–9–0)
January 28	7:00 PM	#1 St. Cloud State		AMSOIL Arena • Duluth, Minnesota	MY9, FOX 9+	Stejskal	W 3–6	7,205	12–13–1 (7–9–0)
February 3	7:00 PM	#10 Western Michigan		AMSOIL Arena • Duluth, Minnesota	MY9	Stejskal	L 2–3 ^{OT}	6,316	12–14–1 (7–10–0)
February 4	6:00 PM	#10 Western Michigan		AMSOIL Arena • Duluth, Minnesota	MY9	Thiessen	L 1–4	6,391	12–15–1 (7–11–0)
February 17	8:00 PM	at #3 Denver		Magness Arena • Denver, Colorado		Stejskal	L 2–6	6,218	12–16–1 (7–12–0)
February 18	7:00 PM	at #3 Denver		Magness Arena • Denver, Colorado	Altitude 2, TSN2	Thiessen	W 6–5	6,361	13–16–1 (8–12–0)
February 24	7:00 PM	Miami		AMSOIL Arena • Duluth, Minnesota	MY9	Thiessen	W 3–2	5,903	14–16–1 (9–12–0)
February 25	8:30 PM	Miami		AMSOIL Arena • Duluth, Minnesota	MY9	Thiessen	L 1–4	5,590	14–17–1 (9–13–0)
March 3	7:30 PM	at #6 St. Cloud State		Herb Brooks National Hockey Center • St. Cloud, Minnesota	FOX 9+	Stejskal	W 4–3	-	15–17–1 (10–13–0)
March 4	6:00 PM	at #6 St. Cloud State		Herb Brooks National Hockey Center • St. Cloud, Minnesota	FOX 9+	Stejskal	L 3–4 ^{OT}	5,636	15–18–1 (10–14–0)
NCHC Tournament
March 10	6:30 PM	at #8 St. Cloud State*		Herb Brooks National Hockey Center • St. Cloud, Minnesota (Quarterfinal Game 1)	FOX 9+	Stejskal	L 1–3	2,620	15–19–1
March 11	5:00 PM	at #8 St. Cloud State*		Herb Brooks National Hockey Center • St. Cloud, Minnesota (Quarterfinal Game 2)	FOX 9+	Stejskal	W 5–1	-	16–19–1
March 12	5:00 PM	at #8 St. Cloud State*		Herb Brooks National Hockey Center • St. Cloud, Minnesota (Quarterfinal Game 3)	FOX 9+	Stejskal	L 1–3	-	16–20–1
*Non-conference game. ^{#}Rankings from USCHO.com Poll. All times are in Central Time. Source:

== Scoring statistics ==
Name	Position	Games	Goals	Assists	Points	PIM
Ben Steeves	F	35	21	7	28	36
Dominic James	C/LW	35	10	18	28	20
Quinn Olson	C/LW	37	7	17	24	32
Wyatt Kaiser	D	35	5	18	23	48
Luke Loheit	RW	35	8	11	19	53
Isaac Howard	LW	35	6	11	17	25
Owen Gallatin	D	37	6	11	17	27
Derek Daschke	C/LW	37	2	14	16	6
Carter Loney	C	37	4	9	13	27
Jesse Jacques	F	37	4	5	9	16
Kyle Bettens	C/RW	33	5	3	8	12
Darian Gotz	D	37	5	3	8	16
Luke Mylymok	C/W	31	3	5	8	17
Tanner Laderoute	F	37	2	5	7	6
Blake Biondi	C	17	3	3	6	4
Cole Spicer	C	32	3	3	6	2
Jack Smith	C/RW	24	0	5	5	10
Aiden Dubinsky	D	29	0	5	5	8
Luke Johnson	C/W	25	1	2	3	11
Joey Pierce	D	26	0	3	3	8
Matthew Thiessen	G	19	0	1	1	0
Will Francis	D	28	0	1	1	22
Riley Bodnarchuk	D	19	0	0	0	8
Zach Stejskal	G	22	0	0	0	0
Total			95	160	255	414

== Goaltending statistics ==
Name	Games	Minutes	Wins	Losses	Ties	Goals against	Saves	Shut outs	SV %	GAA
Matthew Thiessen	19	999:01	8	9	0	44	419	1	.905	2.64
Zach Stejskal	22	1217:47	8	11	1	60	544	0	.901	2.96
Empty Net	-	24:06	-	-	-	10	-	-	-	-
Total	37	2240:54	16	20	1	114	963	1	.894	3.05

== Rankings ==
Poll	Week																											
Poll	Pre	1	2	3	4	5	6	7	8	9	10	11	12	13	14	15	16	17	18	19	20	21	22	23	24	25	26	27 (Final)
USCHO.com	5	-	4	4	10	19	19	20	NR	NR	NR	NR	NR	-	NR	NR	NR	NR	NR	NR	NR	NR	NR	NR	NR	NR	-	NR
USA Today	5	5	4	4	10	19	19	NR	NR	NR	NR	NR	NR	NR	NR	NR	NR	NR	NR	NR	NR	NR	NR	NR	NR	NR	NR	NR

Note: USCHO did not release a poll in weeks 1, 13, or 26.

== Awards and honors ==
Player	Award	Ref
Wyatt Kaiser	NCHC Second Team	
Ben Steeves	NCHC Rookie Team	

== Players drafted into the NHL ==
=== 2023 NHL entry draft ===
Round	Pick	Player	NHL team
2	35	Adam Gajan ^{†}	Chicago Blackhawks
4	115	Jayson Shaugabay ^{†}	Tampa Bay Lightning
4	119	Matthew Perkins ^{†}	Vancouver Canucks
4	124	Beckett Hendrickson ^{†}	Boston Bruins
5	149	Aaron Pionk ^{†}	Minnesota Wild

† incoming freshman
