= 2022–23 Colorado College Tigers men's ice hockey season =

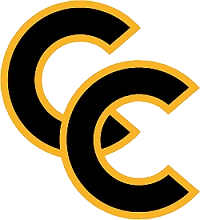
- Conference: 7th NCHC
- Home ice: Ed Robson Arena

Rankings
- USCHO: NR
- USA Today: NR

Record
- Overall: 13–22–3
- Conference: 6–15–3
- Home: 7–9–1
- Road: 5–12–2
- Neutral: 1–1–0

Coaches and captains
- Head coach: Kris Mayotte
- Assistant coaches: Peter Mannino; John Lidgett
- Captain: Bryan Yoon

The 2022–23 Colorado College Tigers men's ice hockey season was the 83rd season of play for the program and the 10th in the NCHC conference. The Tigers represented Colorado College in the 2022–23 NCAA Division I men's ice hockey season and were coached by Kris Mayotte, in his second season.

== Season ==
With coach Mayotte continuing the program's overhaul, Colorado College started the year with less-than-stellar results. Since neither Matt Vernon nor Kaidan Mbereko had managed to earn the job outright, the Tigers alternated between the two netminders in the first month of the season. Both were inconsistent early, however, after a 5–0 blanking of Minnesota Duluth, Mbereko was able to establish himself as the starter and remained in that role for the balance of the season.

On the offensive side, the team saw a little improvement in the first half but they were still carried by scoring of Hunter McKown. The Tigers would only go as far as McKown could take them as he accounted for more than a quarter of CC's goals. Unfortunately, he was unable to lift the team on his own. Colorado College was able to post a respectable record in the first half of the season despite their hit-or-miss offense and were able to get themselves up to .500 once they returned from the winter break.

Unfortunately for the Tigers, the second half of their season was littered with ranked teams. After January 1, CC only played teams who were either ranked at the time or finished the season in the top 20. They were able to get a win from St. Cloud State in mid-January but then proceeded to go winless over the next 13 games. No matter which opponent they faced, the story was the same. CC's defense could put forth a solid defensive effort but the offense could not score. Colorado College averaged exactly 1 goal per game in that stretch with Hunter McKown accounting for more than half of their goals. The Tigers' offense was particularly bad at even strength, garnering just 48 goals for the season.

The losses sent CC tumbling down the standings and the Tigers ended the regular season in 7th place. They began postseason play having to face tournament-bound Western Michigan, who possessed one of the top offenses in the nation, and were a heavy underdog when the series began. Their defense kept CC in the game and the team entered the third period down by just a goal. With only a small hill to climb over, the Tigers produced a shocking outcome when they scored three times in under a minute to take the lead and eventually the game. In the rematch, CC kept the momentum on their side and stymied the Broncos, allowing just 2 goals while adding a pair themselves. Overtime was a furious affair with 7 shots being recorded in just 3 minutes. Luckily for the Tigers, the last came from the stick of Matthew Gleason and was the game winner.

After the improbable win, CC headed to Saint Paul and had to take on long-time rival Denver in the conference semifinal. The Pioneers had swept the season series and, despite missing their starting goaltender, were expected to continue that trend. The Colorado College defense, however, had other ideas; the Tiger defenders shut down Denver's attack all game, limiting the Pios to just 23 shots on goal, all of which were stopped by Mbereko. McKown's power play marker in the second was all that CC could muster but it was all they needed and the Tigers advanced to the title game with a 1–0 shutout.

Colorado College now found itself just 1 win away from the NCAA tournament and only St. Cloud State could stop them. Colorado College got only 17 shots on goal while the Huskies only gave the Tigers' just 1 opportunity. Their loss put an end to the Tigers' run and the team would have to wait for another year.

== Departures ==
Player	Position	Nationality	Cause
Dominic Basse	Goaltender	United States	Transferred to St. Cloud State
Jordan Biro	Forward	Canada	Transferred to American International
Hugo Blixt	Defenseman	Sweden	Graduation (signed with Almtuna IS)
Cooper Fensterstock	Forward	United States	Transferred to Geneseo State
Brian Hawkinson	Forward	United States	Graduation (retired)
Jackson Jutting	Forward	United States	Transferred to Bemidji State
Marc Pasemko	Forward	Canada	Left Program (retired)
Jackson Ross	Defenseman	United States	Graduation (retired)
Brian Williams	Forward	United States	Graduation (retired)

== Recruiting ==
Player	Position	Nationality	Age	Notes
Cade Ahrenholz	Forward	United States	19	Lakeville, MN
Ryan Beck	Forward	United States	19	Linden, MI
Nikolai Charchenko	Defenseman	United States	21	Victoria, MN
Noah Laba	Forward	United States	19	Northville, MI; selected 111th overall in 2022
Kaidan Mbereko	Goaltender	United States	19	West Bloomfield, MI
Noah Serdachny	Forward	Canada	19	Edmonton, AB
Ethan Straky	Defenseman	United States	19	Walnut Creek, CA
Gleb Veremyev	Forward	United States	19	Monroe Township, NJ

== Roster ==
As of August 1, 2022.

No.	Nat.	Player	Class	Pos	Height	Weight	DoB	Hometown	Previous team	NHL rights
1	(United States)	Jake Begley	Junior	G	6' 1" (1.85 m)	166 lb (75 kg)	1999-03-18	Mahtomedi, Minnesota	Brockville Braves (CCHL)	—
2	(United States)	Chad Sasaki	Senior	D	5' 7" (1.7 m)	156 lb (71 kg)	1998-02-06	Cypress, California	Wenatchee Wild (BCHL)	—
4	(United States)	Bryan Yoon (C)	Graduate	D	6' 1" (1.85 m)	178 lb (81 kg)	1998-01-27	Parker, Colorado	Tri-City Storm (USHL)	—
5	(United States)	Jack Millar	Junior	D	6' 5" (1.96 m)	213 lb (97 kg)	2000-11-30	Westminster, Colorado	Cedar Rapids RoughRiders (USHL)	—
7	(United States)	Chase Foley	Junior	D	5' 10" (1.78 m)	169 lb (77 kg)	2000-02-17	Mendota Heights, Minnesota	Sioux Falls Stampede (USHL)	—
8	(United States)	Ryan Beck	Freshman	F	5' 9" (1.75 m)	194 lb (88 kg)	2002-08-25	Linden, Michigan	Dubuque Fighting Saints (USHL)	—
9	(Canada)	Noah Serdachny	Freshman	F	6' 1" (1.85 m)	175 lb (79 kg)	2003-03-09	Edmonton, Alberta	Salmon Arm Silverbacks (BCHL)	—
10	(United States)	Patrick Cozzi	Senior	F	5' 9" (1.75 m)	167 lb (76 kg)	1998-04-30	Greenlawn, New York	Prince George Spruce Kings (BCHL)	—
11	(United States)	Ray Christy	Junior	F	5' 10" (1.78 m)	166 lb (75 kg)	1999-09-15	Saint Paul, Minnesota	Sioux City Musketeers (USHL)	—
13	(United States)	Brett Chorske	Sophomore	F	6' 6" (1.98 m)	193 lb (88 kg)	2001-05-24	Edina, Minnesota	St. Cloud Norsemen (NAHL)	—
14	(United States)	Nate Schweitzer	Sophomore	D	6' 0" (1.83 m)	186 lb (84 kg)	2002-02-21	Champlin, Minnesota	Sioux Falls Stampede (USHL)	—
15	(United States)	Matthew Gleason	Junior	F	5' 8" (1.73 m)	170 lb (77 kg)	2001-09-20	Saint Paul, Minnesota	Chicago Steel (USHL)	—
17	(United States)	Tyler Coffey	Junior	F	5' 10" (1.78 m)	186 lb (84 kg)	2000-05-19	Hamilton, New Jersey	Sioux Falls Stampede (USHL)	—
18	(United States)	Connor Mayer	Senior	D	5' 11" (1.8 m)	175 lb (79 kg)	1999-06-13	Champlin, Minnesota	Central Illinois Flying Aces (USHL)	—
19	(United States)	Tommy Middleton	Sophomore	F	5' 11" (1.8 m)	176 lb (80 kg)	2000-06-19	Midland, Michigan	Janesville Jets (NAHL)	—
20	(United States)	Logan Will	Junior	F	5' 11" (1.8 m)	185 lb (84 kg)	2000-06-14	Ames, Iowa	Omaha Lancers (USHL)	—
21	(United States)	Noah Prokop	Senior	F	6' 1" (1.85 m)	204 lb (93 kg)	2000-01-15	Highlands Ranch, Colorado	Omaha (NCHC)	—
22	(United States)	Nikolai Charchenko	Freshman	D	6' 2" (1.88 m)	210 lb (95 kg)	2001-06-03	Victoria, Minnesota	Minot Minotauros (NAHL)	—
23	(United States)	Ethan Straky	Freshman	F	5' 11" (1.8 m)	178 lb (81 kg)	2003-04-18	Walnut Creek, California	Green Bay Gamblers (USHL)	—
26	(United States)	Noah Laba	Freshman	F	6' 2" (1.88 m)	191 lb (87 kg)	2003-08-04	Northville, Michigan	Lincoln Stars (USHL)	NYR, 111th overall 2022
27	(Canada)	Stanley Cooley	Sophomore	F	5' 11" (1.8 m)	194 lb (88 kg)	2002-05-27	Regina, Saskatchewan	Lincoln Stars (USHL)	—
28	(United States)	Gleb Veremyev	Freshman	F	6' 4" (1.93 m)	200 lb (91 kg)	2003-06-28	Sayreville, New Jersey	Lincoln Stars (USHL)	—
29	(United States)	Cade Ahrenholz	Freshman	F	6' 3" (1.91 m)	218 lb (99 kg)	2002-11-30	Lakeville, Minnesota	Omaha Lancers (USHL)	—
30	(Canada)	Matt Vernon	Senior	G	5' 11" (1.8 m)	174 lb (79 kg)	1998-03-29	Calgary, Alberta	Aberdeen Wings (NAHL)	—
33	(United States)	Kaidan Mbereko	Freshman	G	5' 11" (1.8 m)	190 lb (86 kg)	2003-07-28	Aspen, Colorado	Lincoln Stars (USHL)	—
37	(United States)	Nicklas Andrews	Junior	D	5' 10" (1.78 m)	192 lb (87 kg)	2001-07-06	Canton, Michigan	Des Moines Buccaneers (USHL)	—
39	(United States)	Danny Weight	Junior	F	6' 0" (1.83 m)	174 lb (79 kg)	2001-05-01	Lattingtown, New York	Boston College (HEA)	—
41	(United States)	Hunter McKown	Junior	F	6' 1" (1.85 m)	195 lb (88 kg)	2002-08-18	San Jose, California	NTDP (USHL)	—

== Standings ==
2022–23 National Collegiate Hockey Conference Standings
	Conference record										Overall record					
	GP	W	L	T	OTW	OTL	SW	PTS	GF	GA	GP	W	L	T	GF	GA
#6 Denver †	24	19	5	0	2	1	0	56	94	53	40	30	10	0	150	86
#11 Western Michigan	24	15	8	1	2	0	0	44	86	60	39	23	15	1	148	102
#20 Omaha	24	13	9	2	2	2	1	42	71	64	37	19	15	3	109	97
#5 St. Cloud State *	24	12	9	3	2	1	3	41	85	68	41	25	13	3	133	95
Minnesota Duluth	24	10	14	0	1	4	0	33	65	81	37	16	20	1	95	114
#17 North Dakota	24	10	10	4	3	0	2	33	75	70	39	18	15	6	127	110
Colorado College	24	6	15	3	0	2	2	25	37	60	38	13	22	3	79	99
Miami	24	3	18	3	0	2	0	14	39	96	36	8	24	4	73	137
Championship: March 18, 2023 † indicates conference regular season champion (Penrose Cup) * indicates conference tournament champion (Frozen Faceoff Championship Trophy); Rankings: USCHO.com Top 20 Poll

== Schedule and results ==
Date	Time	Opponent^{#}	Rank^{#}	Site	TV	Decision	Result	Attendance	Record
Exhibition
October 1	6:05 PM	at Air Force*		Cadet Ice Arena • Colorado Springs, Colorado (Exhibition)		Mbereko	W 5–1	1,535	
Regular Season
October 7	7:00 PM	Alaska Anchorage*		Ed Robson Arena • Colorado Springs, Colorado	ATTRM	Vernon	W 6–2	3,652	1–0–0
October 8	6:00 PM	Alaska Anchorage*		Ed Robson Arena • Colorado Springs, Colorado		Mbereko	W 4–1	3,701	2–0–0
October 14	5:00 PM	at St. Lawrence*		Appleton Arena • Canton, New York	ESPN+	Vernon	L 1–5	893	2–1–0
October 15	5:00 PM	at St. Lawrence*		Appleton Arena • Canton, New York	ESPN+	Mbereko	L 1–4	923	2–2–0
October 21	7:00 PM	at Arizona State*		Mullett Arena • Tempe, Arizona	Pac-12 Insider	Vernon	L 3–5	4,692	2–3–0
October 22	7:00 PM	at Arizona State*		Mullett Arena • Tempe, Arizona	Pac-12 Insider	Mbereko	L 1–6	4,967	2–4–0
October 28	7:30 PM	Air Force*		Ed Robson Arena • Colorado Springs, Colorado (Rivalry)	ATTRM	Vernon	W 8–0	3,418	3–4–0
October 29	7:00 PM	at Air Force*		Cadet Ice Arena • Colorado Springs, Colorado (Rivalry)	Altitude 2	Vernon	L 3–6	2,050	3–5–0
November 4	7:30 PM	#19 Minnesota Duluth		Ed Robson Arena • Colorado Springs, Colorado	ATTRM	Mbereko	W 5–0	3,411	4–5–0 (1–0–0)
November 5	6:00 PM	#19 Minnesota Duluth		Ed Robson Arena • Colorado Springs, Colorado		Mbereko	L 1–3	3,412	4–6–0 (1–1–0)
November 11	5:00 PM	at Miami		Steve Cady Arena • Oxford, Ohio		Mbereko	T 1–1 ^{SOW}	1,978	4–6–1 (1–1–1)
November 12	3:00 PM	at Miami		Steve Cady Arena • Oxford, Ohio		Mbereko	W 2–1	2,131	5–6–1 (2–1–1)
November 18	7:30 PM	#4 St. Cloud State		Ed Robson Arena • Colorado Springs, Colorado	ATTRM	Mbereko	L 1–3	3,416	5–7–1 (2–2–1)
November 19	6:00 PM	#4 St. Cloud State		Ed Robson Arena • Colorado Springs, Colorado		Mbereko	L 0–5	3,423	5–8–1 (2–3–1)
December 2	6:00 PM	at Minnesota Duluth		AMSOIL Arena • Duluth, Minnesota	ATTRM, MY9	Mbereko	W 3–0	6,184	6–8–1 (3–3–1)
December 3	6:00 PM	at Minnesota Duluth		AMSOIL Arena • Duluth, Minnesota	MY9	Mbereko	L 0–4	5,794	6–9–1 (3–4–1)
December 9	7:30 PM	Omaha		Ed Robson Arena • Colorado Springs, Colorado	ATTRM	Mbereko	W 6–4	3,409	7–9–1 (4–4–1)
December 10	6:00 PM	Omaha		Ed Robson Arena • Colorado Springs, Colorado		Mbereko	W 1–0	3,416	8–9–1 (5–4–1)
December 30	7:00 PM	Princeton*		Ed Robson Arena • Colorado Springs, Colorado	ATTRM	Vernon	W 7–2	3,425	9–9–1
December 31	4:00 PM	Princeton*		Ed Robson Arena • Colorado Springs, Colorado		Vernon	L 1–2	3,415	9–10–1
January 13	6:30 PM	at #3 St. Cloud State		Herb Brooks National Hockey Center • St. Cloud, Minnesota	FOX 9+	Vernon	W 4–2	3,764	10–10–1 (6–4–1)
January 14	5:00 PM	at #3 St. Cloud State		Herb Brooks National Hockey Center • St. Cloud, Minnesota	FOX 9+	Mbereko	L 0–4	5,103	10–11–1 (6–5–1)
January 20	7:30 PM	#10 Western Michigan		Ed Robson Arena • Colorado Springs, Colorado	ATTRM	Mbereko	L 1–4	3,408	10–12–1 (6–6–1)
January 21	6:00 PM	#10 Western Michigan		Ed Robson Arena • Colorado Springs, Colorado		Mbereko	L 1–4	3,407	10–13–1 (6–7–1)
January 27	7:00 PM	at #5 Denver		Ball Arena • Denver, Colorado (Rivalry)	Altitude	Mbereko	L 0–2	17,952	10–14–1 (6–8–1)
February 4	6:00 PM	#4 Denver		Ed Robson Arena • Colorado Springs, Colorado (Rivalry)	ATTRM	Mbereko	L 1–4	3,892	10–15–1 (6–9–1)
February 10	6:00 PM	at #16 Omaha		Baxter Arena • Omaha, Nebraska		Mbereko	L 2–3	7,942	10–16–1 (6–10–1)
February 11	6:00 PM	at #16 Omaha		Baxter Arena • Omaha, Nebraska		Mbereko	T 2–2 ^{SOW}	7,755	10–16–2 (6–10–2)
February 17	5:00 PM	at #8 Western Michigan		Lawson Arena • Kalamazoo, Michigan		Mbereko	L 1–4	3,585	10–17–2 (6–11–2)
February 18	4:00 PM	at #8 Western Michigan		Lawson Arena • Kalamazoo, Michigan		Mbereko	L 1–2	3,761	10–18–2 (6–12–2)
February 24	7:30 PM	North Dakota		Ed Robson Arena • Colorado Springs, Colorado	ATTRM	Mbereko	L 1–2 ^{OT}	3,481	10–19–2 (6–13–2)
February 25	6:00 PM	North Dakota		Ed Robson Arena • Colorado Springs, Colorado		Vernon	T 0–0 ^{SOL}	3,501	10–19–3 (6–13–3)
March 3	7:00 PM	at #3 Denver		Magness Arena • Denver, Colorado (Rivalry)	CBSSN	Vernon	L 1–2	6,667	10–20–3 (6–14–3)
March 4	6:00 PM	#3 Denver		Ed Robson Arena • Colorado Springs, Colorado (Rivalry)	ATTRM	Vernon	L 2–4	3,894	10–21–3 (6–15–3)
NCHC Tournament
March 10	3:00 PM	at #7 Western Michigan*		Lawson Arena • Kalamazoo, Michigan (Quarterfinal Game 1)		Mbereko	W 3–1	3,218	11–21–3
March 11	2:00 PM	at #7 Western Michigan*		Lawson Arena • Kalamazoo, Michigan (Quarterfinal Game 2)		Mbereko	W 3–2 ^{OT}	3,557	12–21–3
March 17	3:00 PM	vs. #3 Denver*		Xcel Energy Center • Saint Paul, Minnesota (Semifinal, Rivalry)	CBSSN	Mbereko	W 1–0	10,242	13–21–3
March 18	6:30 PM	vs. #7 St. Cloud State*		Xcel Energy Center • Saint Paul, Minnesota (Championship)	CBSSN	Mbereko	L 0–3	6,877	13–22–3
*Non-conference game. ^{#}Rankings from USCHO.com Poll. All times are in Mountain Time. Source:

== Scoring statistics ==
Name	Position	Games	Goals	Assists	Points	PIM
Hunter McKown	C	38	21	7	28	30
Noah Laba	C	35	11	11	22	48
Stan Cooley	C	38	6	14	20	18
Bryan Yoon	D	38	1	14	15	4
Nicklas Andrews	D	37	2	12	14	14
Ryan Beck	C	38	2	11	13	14
Logan Will	F	33	5	7	12	12
Tyler Coffey	F	37	8	3	11	8
Matthew Gleason	C	35	4	6	10	40
Ethan Straky	D	38	2	8	10	8
Jack Millar	D	38	1	6	7	25
Gleb Veremyev	C	14	2	5	7	18
Connor Mayer	D	34	1	6	7	22
Noah Serdachny	F	27	3	4	7	2
Patrick Cozzi	RW	38	3	3	6	2
Noah Prokop	C	36	2	4	6	22
Chase Foley	D	34	0	6	6	8
Danny Weight	C	22	1	3	4	13
Ray Christy	F	30	1	3	4	6
Brett Chorske	C/RW	19	2	1	3	2
Tommy Middleton	F	33	1	2	3	8
Nate Schweitzer	D	11	0	1	1	4
Jake Begley	G	1	0	0	0	0
Nikolai Charchenko	D	1	0	0	0	0
Chad Sasaki	D	1	0	0	0	2
Matt Vernon	G	12	0	0	0	0
Cade Ahrenholz	RW	14	0	0	0	7
Kaidan Mbereko	G	30	0	0	0	0
Total			79	137	216	335

== Goaltending statistics ==
Name	Games	Minutes	Wins	Losses	Ties	Goals against	Saves	Shut outs	SV %	GAA
Jake Begley	1	1:22	0	0	0	0	1	0	1.000	0.00
Kaidan Mbereko	32	1644:40	9	16	2	63	782	4	.925	2.30
Matt Vernon	12	629:45	4	6	1	27	258	2	.905	2.57
Empty Net	-	29:31	-	-	-	9	-	-	-	-
Total	38	2305:18	13	22	3	99	1041	6	.913	2.58

== Rankings ==
Poll	Week																											
Poll	Pre	1	2	3	4	5	6	7	8	9	10	11	12	13	14	15	16	17	18	19	20	21	22	23	24	25	26	27 (Final)
USCHO.com	NR	-	NR	NR	NR	NR	NR	NR	NR	NR	NR	NR	NR	-	NR	NR	NR	NR	NR	NR	NR	NR	NR	NR	NR	NR	-	NR
USA Today	NR	NR	NR	NR	NR	NR	NR	NR	NR	NR	NR	NR	NR	NR	NR	NR	NR	NR	NR	NR	NR	NR	NR	NR	NR	NR	NR	NR

Note: USCHO did not release a poll in weeks 1, 13, or 26.

== Awards and honors ==
Player	Award	Ref
Kaidan Mbereko	NCHC Second Team	
Kaidan Mbereko	NCHC Rookie Team	
Bryan Yoon	NCHC All-Tournament Team	
Hunter McKown	NCHC All-Tournament Team	

== Players drafted into the NHL ==
=== 2023 NHL entry draft ===
Round	Pick	Player	NHL team
6	166	Carsen Musser ^{†}	Arizona Coyotes
7	204	Owen Beckner ^{†}	Ottawa Senators
7	212	Zaccharya Wisdom ^{†}	Seattle Kraken

† incoming freshman
