= Ty Mueller =

Canadian ice hockey player (born 2003)

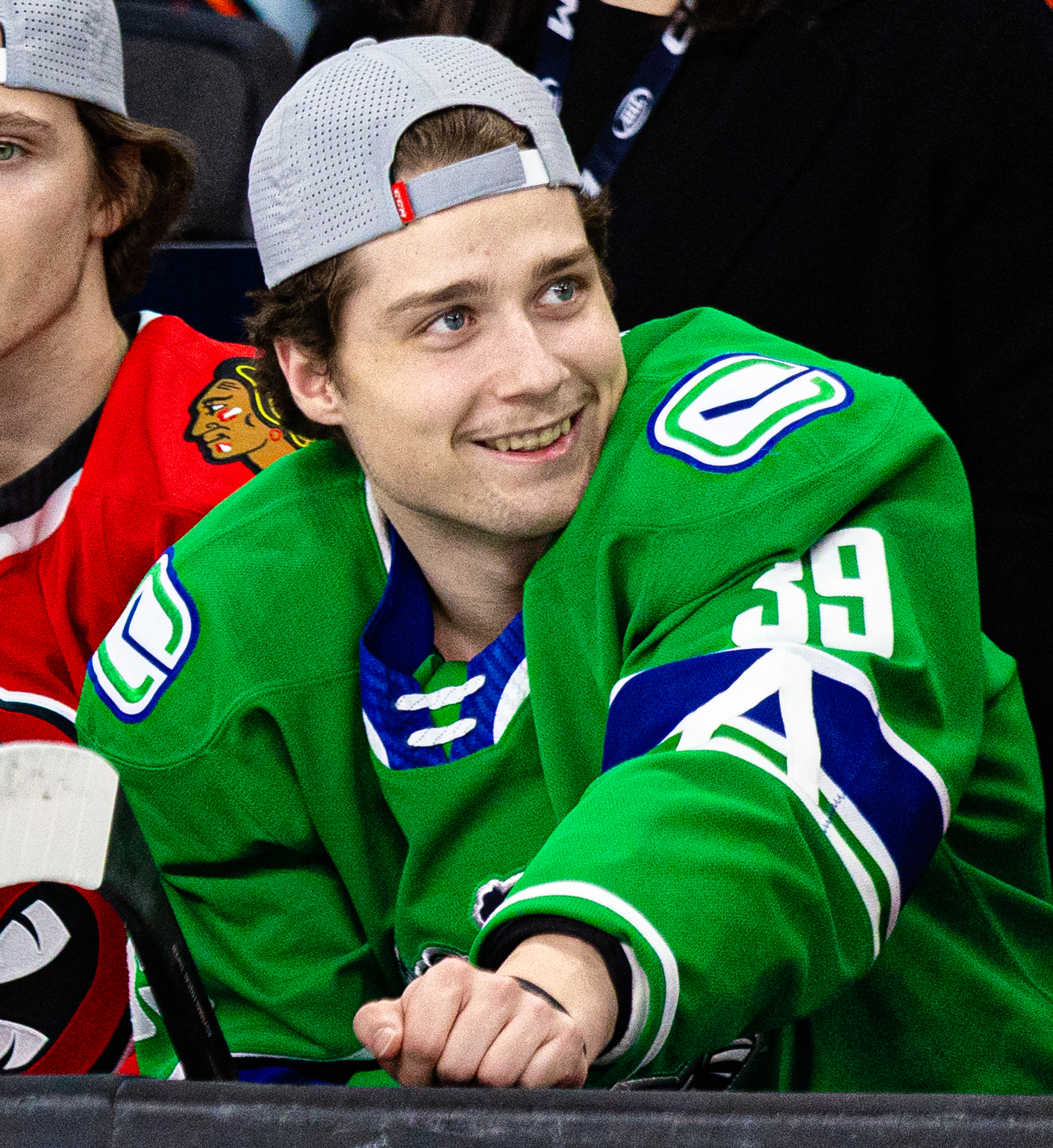
- Mueller representing the Abbotsford Canucks at the 2025 AHL All-Star Classic
- Born: February 26, 2003 (age 23) Edmonton, Alberta, Canada
- Height: 5 ft 11 in (180 cm)
- Weight: 185 lb (84 kg; 13 st 3 lb)
- Position: Centre
- Shoots: Left
- NHL team (P) Cur. team: Vancouver Canucks; Abbotsford Canucks (AHL)
- NHL draft: 105th overall, 2023; Vancouver Canucks
- Playing career: 2024–present

Ty Mueller (born February 26, 2003) is a Canadian professional ice hockey centre. He currently plays for the Abbotsford Canucks of the American Hockey League while under contract with the Vancouver Canucks of the National Hockey League (NHL). Mueller was drafted by the Vancouver Canucks in the 2023 NHL entry draft.

== Personal life ==
Mueller was born on February 26, 2003, in Edmonton, Alberta, Canada, to parents Jamie and Steve. His younger brother Colton also played ice hockey.

== Playing career ==
=== Junior ===
Growing up in Cochrane, Alberta, Mueller began playing ice hockey within the Cochrane Minor Hockey Association. He competed with the Airdrie Xtreme U15 AAA team in the Alberta Major Bantam Hockey League (AMBHL) from 2016 to 2018. As one of the team's top scorers in 2017–18, Mueller was named to Team Central for the 2018 Alberta Cup. After helping Team Central win the Alberta Cup, Mueller returned to the Airdrie Xtreme and led them to a AMBHL championship title. He was also selected for the 2018 U15 World Selects Invitational in Philadelphia before being drafted by the Prince George Cougars in the 2018 Western Hockey League (WHL) Bantam Draft. Despite being drafted, Mueller spent the 2018–19 season with the Airdrie CFR Bisons U18 AAA in the Alberta Midget Hockey League (AMHL) and two games with the Okotoks Oilers in the Alberta Junior Hockey League (AJHL). In his first season with the Airdrie CFR Bisons, he scored 10 goals and 24 assists through 34 games and received numerous team accolades including Most Valuable Player, Top Defensive Forward, co-Rookie of the Year, and co-Top Scorer.

Mueller then joined the Sherwood Park Crusaders in the AJHL from 2019 to 2021. In his first season with the team, he scored 30 points through 50 games and was named to the AJHL All-North Rookie Team. Mueller became the 15th player in franchise history to be named to the AJHL All-Rookie Team. He also committed to play collegiate ice hockey with the Omaha Mavericks at the University of Nebraska Omaha. In his second season with the Crusaders, Mueller began to earn attention from National Hockey League (NHL) scouts. He was listed on the NHL Central Scouting Bureau's 'Players to Watch' list in October and November 2020. However, the AJHL halted play in November after only four games and only started up again in mid-March 2021. Despite his limited play, Mueller scored eight goals and three assists and was named team MVP.

=== Collegiate ===
Mueller played for the Omaha Mavericks at the University of Nebraska Omaha from 2021 to 2024 while majoring in business. He made his collegiate debut on October 30, 2021 and scored his first collegiate goal on November 6 against the Miami RedHawks. Mueller was recognized as the NCHC Rookie of the Month in February after tallying five points and recording his first two multi-point games. He finished his freshman season with eight goals and five assists for 13 points.

Mueller improved offensively during the 2022–23 season and was nominated for the Hobey Baker Award as the top National Collegiate Athletic Association men's ice hockey player. Following his sophomore season, Mueller was drafted in the fourth round, 105th overall, of the 2023 NHL entry draft by the Vancouver Canucks. He then returned to the Mavericks for his junior season.

=== Professional ===
Mueller concluded his collegiate career by signing a three-year, entry-level contract with the Vancouver Canucks on March 30, 2024. He made his professional debut on October 11, 2024, with the Vancouver Canucks' American Hockey League (AHL) affiliate, the Abbotsford Canucks. Mueller recorded his first AHL point, an assist on Mark Friedman's goal, on October 25, 2024, against the San Diego Gulls. He scored his first AHL goal six games later on November 6, in an 8–4 loss to the Ontario Reign. By February, Mueller led all Abbotsford rookies with 15 assists and 22 points. At the age of 21 years, 11 months and 8 days old, he also became the youngest player in franchise history to represent the Abbotsford Canucks at an AHL All-Star Game.

Mueller was called up to the NHL on April 12, 2025, to replace an ill Max Sasson in the Canucks lineup. He skated 10 minutes and 56 seconds of ice time in his debut on April 13 while skating alongside Brock Boeser and Jake DeBrusk. Mueller scored his first NHL goal on April 16, 2026 in his home province against the Edmonton Oilers, during the last game of the 2025–26 Vancouver Canucks season that saw the Canucks lost 6-1.

== Career statistics ==
			Regular season					Playoffs
Season	Team	League	GP	G	A	Pts	PIM	GP	G	A	Pts	PIM
2022–23	Univ. of Nebraska-Omaha	NCHC	34	12	13	25	4	—	—	—	—	—
2023–24	Univ. of Nebraska-Omaha	NCHC	40	11	15	26	33	—	—	—	—	—
2024–25	Abbotsford Canucks	AHL	64	12	27	39	24	24	3	9	12	9
2024–25	Vancouver Canucks	NHL	2	0	0	0	2	—	—	—	—	—
2025–26	Abbotsford Canucks	AHL	61	16	21	37	30	—	—	—	—	—
2025–26	Vancouver Canucks	NHL	6	1	0	1	2	—	—	—	—	—
NHL totals			8	1	0	1	4	—	—	—	—	—

== Awards and honours ==
Award	Year	Ref
AHL
Calder Cup Champion	2025	
