= Mike Gabinet =

Canadian ice hockey player and coach

- Born: September 26, 1981 (age 45) Edmonton, Alberta, Canada
- Height: 6 ft 3 in (191 cm)
- Weight: 209 lb (95 kg; 14 st 13 lb)
- Position: Defence
- Shot: Left
- Played for: SaiPa; Iowa Stars; Springfield Falcons; Abbotsford Heat; HC Vita Hästen
- NHL draft: 237th overall, 2001; Los Angeles Kings
- Playing career: 2004–2012 Coaching career

Current position
- Title: Head coach
- Team: Omaha
- Conference: NCHC

Biographical details
- Education: University of Nebraska Omaha

Playing career
- 2000–2004: Nebraska–Omaha
- 2004–2005: SaiPa
- 2005–2007: Idaho Steelheads
- 2005–2006: Iowa Stars
- 2007–2008: South Carolina Stingrays
- 2007–2009: Springfield Falcons
- 2010–2011: Idaho Steelheads
- 2010–2011: Abbotsford Heat
- 2010–2011: HC Vita Hästen
- 2011–2012: Ontario Reign
- Position: Defenceman

Coaching career (HC unless noted)
- 2012–2015: Northern Alberta IT (assistant)
- 2015–2016: Northern Alberta IT
- 2016–2017: Omaha (assistant)
- 2017–present: Omaha

Head coaching record
- Overall: 135–131–17 (.507)
- Tournaments: 0–2 (.000)

Mike Gabinet (born September 26, 1981) is a Canadian former professional ice hockey player and current head men's hockey ice hockey coach at the University of Nebraska at Omaha.

== Playing career ==
Gabinet was selected by the Los Angeles Kings in the 8th round (237th overall) of the 2001 NHL entry draft. He played for the Nebraska-Omaha Mavericks from 2000-2004, serving as an alternate captain during his senior season. Gabinet played in 130 career games, earning six goals and 41 assists for 47 points. He currently ranks ninth all-time in scoring for UNO defensemen. Gabinet graduated with a business finance degree from UNO.

Gabinet played eight seasons of professional ice hockey in Europe and North America, including his rookie 2004–05 SM-liiga season with SaiPa.

== Coaching career ==
He previously was an associate head coach for the men's hockey team. He was previously head coach of the men's ice hockey team at the Northern Alberta Institute of Technology located in Edmonton, Alberta. In his first season as head coach of NAIT, he led his team to the Alberta Colleges Athletic Conference Championship with a perfect 36-0 record. He was the first rookie head coach to guide his team to the conference championship since 2005-06 and he was also the first rookie head coach in Canadian college hockey history to guide his team to an undefeated season. Under Gabinet's guidance, the Ooks set an ACAC record for regular season wins (32) and overall wins (36). They were also just the third team in 51 years to go undefeated in the ACAC regular season & the ACAC playoffs. Gabinet was named the ACAC Coach of the Year in 2016.

== Career statistics ==
| | | | Regular season | | | | | Playoffs |
| Season | Team | League | GP | G | A | Pts | PIM | GP | G | A | Pts | PIM |
|---|---|---|---|---|---|---|---|---|---|---|---|---|
| 1998–99 | MLAC AAA | AMHL | 33 | 1 | 15 | 16 | 34 | — | — | — | — | — |
| 1999–2000 | Lloydminster Blazers | AJHL | 56 | 4 | 25 | 29 | 30 | — | — | — | — | — |
| 2000–01 | University of Nebraska Omaha | CCHA | 30 | 2 | 13 | 15 | 14 | — | — | — | — | — |
| 2001–02 | University of Nebraska Omaha | CCHA | 21 | 0 | 4 | 4 | 8 | — | — | — | — | — |
| 2002–03 | University of Nebraska Omaha | CCHA | 40 | 0 | 4 | 4 | 46 | — | — | — | — | — |
| 2003–04 | University of Nebraska Omaha | CCHA | 39 | 4 | 20 | 24 | 70 | — | — | — | — | — |
| 2004–05 | SaiPa | SM-liiga | 54 | 2 | 1 | 3 | 46 | — | — | — | — | — |
| 2005–06 | Idaho Steelheads | ECHL | 22 | 2 | 12 | 14 | 18 | — | — | — | — | — |
| 2005–06 | Iowa Stars | AHL | 18 | 0 | 2 | 2 | 8 | — | — | — | — | — |
| 2006–07 | Idaho Steelheads | ECHL | 40 | 4 | 17 | 21 | 38 | — | — | — | — | — |
| 2007–08 | South Carolina Stingrays | ECHL | 23 | 2 | 12 | 14 | 18 | — | — | — | — | — |
| 2007–08 | Springfield Falcons | AHL | 19 | 0 | 3 | 3 | 10 | — | — | — | — | — |
| 2008–09 | Springfield Falcons | AHL | 45 | 2 | 6 | 8 | 29 | — | — | — | — | — |
| 2010–11 | Idaho Steelheads | ECHL | 26 | 4 | 10 | 14 | 25 | — | — | — | — | — |
| 2010–11 | Abbotsford Heat | AHL | 1 | 0 | 0 | 0 | 2 | — | — | — | — | — |
| 2010–11 | HC Vita Hästen | Allsv | 12 | 1 | 3 | 4 | 58 | 10 | 0 | 1 | 1 | 33 |
| 2011–12 | Ontario Reign | ECHL | 19 | 2 | 10 | 12 | 20 | 5 | 0 | 1 | 1 | 6 |
| ECHL totals | | | 130 | 14 | 61 | 75 | 146 | 5 | 0 | 1 | 1 | 6 |
| AHL totals | | | 83 | 2 | 11 | 13 | 49 | — | — | — | — | — |

== Head coaching record ==
Record table
| Season | Team | Overall | Conference | Standing | Postseason |
|---|---|---|---|---|---|
Omaha Mavericks (NCHC) (2017–present)
| 2017–18 | Omaha | 17–17–2 | 10–13–1 | T–5th | NCHC First Round |
| 2018–19 | Omaha | 9–24–3 | 5–17–2 | T–5th | NCHC First Round |
| 2019–20 | Omaha | 14–17–3 | 8–13–3 | 6th | Tournament cancelled |
| 2020–21 | Omaha | 14–11–1 | 14–9–1 | 4th | NCAA West Regional Semifinal |
| 2021–22 | Omaha | 21–17–0 | 11–13–0 | 6th | NCHC Quarterfinals |
| 2022–23 | Omaha | 19–15–3 | 13–9–2 | 3rd | NCHC Quarterfinals |
| 2023–24 | Omaha | 23–13–4 | 13–8–3 | 5th | NCAA West Regional Semifinal |
| 2024–25 | Omaha | 18–17–1 | 14–9–1 | 4th | NCHC Quarterfinals |
| Omaha: | | 135–131–17 | 88–91–13 | | |
| Total: | | 135–131–17 | | | |
National champion Postseason invitational champion Conference regular season champion Conference regular season and conference tournament champion Division regular season champion Division regular season and conference tournament champion Conference tournament champion
