= 2023 NCHC Tournament =

2023 NCHC Men's ice hockey tournament
- Dates: March 10–18, 2023
- Teams: 8
- Finals site: Xcel Energy Center; Saint Paul, Minnesota
- Champions: St. Cloud State (2nd title)
- Winning coach: Brett Larson (1st title)
- MVP: Jami Krannila (St. Cloud State)
- NCHC Men's Ice Hockey Tournaments

The 2023 NCHC Tournament was the ninth tournament in league history. It was played between March 10 and 18, 2023. Quarterfinal games were played at home team campus sites, while the final four matches were held at the Xcel Energy Center in Saint Paul, Minnesota. As the tournament winner, St. Cloud State earned the NCHC's automatic bid to the 2023 NCAA Division I men's ice hockey tournament.

== Format ==
The first round of the postseason tournament featured a best-of-three games format. All eight conference teams participated in the tournament. Teams were seeded No. 1 through No. 8 according to their final conference standing, with a tiebreaker system used to seed teams with an identical number of points accumulated. The top four seeded teams each earn home ice and host one of the lower seeded teams.

The winners of the first round series advanced to the Xcel Energy Center for the NCHC Frozen Faceoff. The Frozen Faceoff used a single-elimination format. Teams were re-seeded No. 1 through No. 4 according to the final regular season conference standings.

=== Standings ===
2022–23 National Collegiate Hockey Conference Standings
	Conference record										Overall record					
	GP	W	L	T	OTW	OTL	SW	PTS	GF	GA	GP	W	L	T	GF	GA
#6 Denver †	24	19	5	0	2	1	0	56	94	53	40	30	10	0	150	86
#11 Western Michigan	24	15	8	1	2	0	0	44	86	60	39	23	15	1	148	102
#20 Omaha	24	13	9	2	2	2	1	42	71	64	37	19	15	3	109	97
#5 St. Cloud State *	24	12	9	3	2	1	3	41	85	68	41	25	13	3	133	95
Minnesota Duluth	24	10	14	0	1	4	0	33	65	81	37	16	20	1	95	114
#17 North Dakota	24	10	10	4	3	0	2	33	75	70	39	18	15	6	127	110
Colorado College	24	6	15	3	0	2	2	25	37	60	38	13	22	3	79	99
Miami	24	3	18	3	0	2	0	14	39	96	36	8	24	4	73	137
Championship: March 18, 2023 † indicates conference regular season champion (Penrose Cup) * indicates conference tournament champion (Frozen Faceoff Championship Trophy); Rankings: USCHO.com Top 20 Poll

== Bracket ==
Teams are reseeded for the semifinals.

Quarterfinals; March 10–12
1	Denver	6	7	-
8	Miami	2	2	-
2	Western Michigan	1	2	-
7	Colorado College	3	3*	-
3	Omaha	2	1	2
6	North Dakota	1	3	5
4	St. Cloud State	3	1	3
5	Minnesota Duluth	1	5	1

Semifinals; March 17
1	Denver	0
7	Colorado College	1
4	St. Cloud State	3*
6	North Dakota	2

Championship; March 18
7	Colorado College	0
4	St. Cloud State	3

* denotes overtime periods

== Results ==
All times are local.

=== Quarterfinals ===
==== (1) Denver vs. (8) Miami ====
March 10, 2023; 7:00 PM	Denver	6–2 (2–1, 1–1, 3–0)	Miami	Magness Arena; Attendance: 4,873

Game reference

Matt Davis
Goalies
Ludvig Persson
Referees:
Brian Hankes
Sterling Egan
Linesmen:
John Grandt
Erik Contino

	0–1	29:20 – P. J. Fletcher (5) (Kumlin, Dukovac)
(Dornbach, Thompson) Jack Devine (10) – PP – 07:38	1–1
(Broz, King) Jack Devine (11) – 31:05	2–1
(Mazur, Dornbach) Jack Devine (12) – PP GW – 32:03	3–1
	3–2	38:39 – PP – Joe Cassetti (20) (Rydqvist, Barbolini)
(Benning, Thompson) Jack Devine (13) – PP – 42:18	4–2
(Broz) Tristan Lemyre (3) – 49:50	5–2
(Lemyre, Lee) Connor Caponi (2) – EN – 58:53	6–2

14 min
Penalties
14 min
34
Shots
32

March 11, 2023; 6:00 PM	Denver	7–2 (4–1, 2–1, 1–0)	Miami	Magness Arena; Attendance: 5,567

Game reference

(out 55:30) Matt Davis
(in 55:30) Jack Caruso
Goalies
Ludvig Persson (out 28:16)
Logan Neaton (in 28:16)
Referees:
Brian Hankes
Sterling Egan
Linesmen:
John Grandt
Erik Contino

(Thompson, Mazur) Casey Dornbach (13) – 00:36	1–0
(Dornbach, Mayhew) Aidan Thompson (10) – 02:37	2–0
(Haskins, Buium) Owen Ozar (1) – GW – 03:24	3–0
	3–1	06:11 – PP – Ryan Savage (6) (Dukovac, Murray)
(Mayhew, King) Shai Buium (4) – PP – 18:24	4–1
(King, Mayhew) Tristan Lemyre (4) – PP – 24:49	5–1
(Lemyre) Lucas Olvestad (1) – 28:16	6–1
	6–2	36:06 – Artur Turansky (20) (Barbolini)
(Mayhew) Jack Devine (14) – 58:58	7–2

8 min
Penalties
10 min
29
Shots
23

Denver Won Series 2–0

==== (2) Western Michigan vs. (7) Colorado College ====
March 10, 2023; 5:00 PM	Western Michigan	1–3 (1–0, 0–0, 0–3)	Colorado College	Lawson Arena; Attendance: 3,218

Game reference

Cameron Rowe
Goalies
Kaidan Mbereko
Referees:
Brandon Schmitt
Nathan Wieler
Linesmen:
Dan Cohen
Eric Frank

(Polin, Sasson) Ryan McAllister (12) – 14:50	1–0
	1–1	53:36 – Logan Will (5) (Straky, Christy)
	1–2	54:16 – GW – Tyler Coffey (12) (Laba, Andrews)
	1–3	54:35 – PP – Hunter McKown (20) (Yoon, Cooley)

6 min
Penalties
17 min
26
Shots
25

March 11, 2023; 4:00 PM	Western Michigan	2–3 (OT) (1–1, 0–1, 1–0, 0–1)	Colorado College	Lawson Arena; Attendance: 3,557

Game reference

Cameron Rowe
Goalies
Kaidan Mbereko
Referees:
Brandon Schmitt
Nathan Wieler
Linesmen:
Dan Cohen
Eric Frank

(Sasson, Fiedler) Ryan McAllister (13) – 10:32	1–0
	1–1	10:46 – Noah Serdachny (3) (Cooley)
	1–2	27:15 – Noah Laba (11) (McKown, Straky)
(McAllister, Galambos) Max Sasson (15) – 50:26	2–2
	2–3	63:08 – GW – Matthew Gleason (4) (Cozzi, Will)

6 min
Penalties
6 min
30
Shots
31

Colorado College Won Series 2–0

==== (3) Omaha vs. (6) North Dakota ====
March 3, 2023; 6:07 PM	Omaha	2–1 (0–0, 2–0, 0–1)	North Dakota	Baxter Arena; Attendance: 6,510

Game reference

Simon Latkoczy
Goalies
Drew DeRidder
Referees:
Dan Dreger
Ryan Hersey
Linesmen:
Sam Rankin
Jeff Schultz

(Pennington, Slipec) Jacob Guevin (4) – 24:29	1–0
(Guevin, Bohlsen) Davis Pennington (1) – GW – 27:00	2–0
	2–1	58:46 – EA – Riese Gaber (20) (Schmaltz, Jandric)

19 min
Penalties
10 min
28
Shots
41

March 11, 2023; 6:07 PM	Omaha	1–3 (0–0, 2–0, 0–1)	North Dakota	Baxter Arena; Attendance: 7,348

Game reference

Simon Latkoczy
Goalies
Drew DeRidder
Referees:
Dan Dreger
Ryan Hersey
Linesmen:
Sam Rankin
Jeff Schultz

	0–1	10:01 – Jackson Blake (16) (Jamernik, Gaber)
(Guevin, Bremer) Joaquim Lemay (2) – PP – 12:24	1–1
	1–2	58:46 – GW PP – Tyler Kleven (7) (Jamernik, Gaber)
	1–3	58:59 – EN – Dylan James (7) (Sidorski)

10 min
Penalties
14 min
25
Shots
22

March 12, 2023; 5:07 PM	Omaha	2–5 (1–0, 1–2, 0–3)	North Dakota	Baxter Arena; Attendance: 5,571

Game reference

Simon Latkoczy
Goalies
Drew DeRidder
Referees:
Dan Dreger
Ryan Hersey
Linesmen:
Sam Rankin
Jeff Schultz

(Pennington, Berg) Jimmy Glynn (4) – 14:14	1–0
	1–1	22:36 – PP – Jake Schmaltz (5) (Hain)
(Proctor, Krenzen) Cameron Berg (10) – 32:04	2–1
	2–2	58:46 – SH – Dylan James (8) (Caulfield)
	2–3	54:46 – GW – Griffin Ness (7) (Sidorski, Albrecht)
	2–4	56:11 – Tyler Kleven (8) (unassisted)
	2–5	56:28 – Gavin Hain (11) (Caulfield)

16 min
Penalties
12 min
14
Shots
36

North Dakota Won Series 2–1

==== (4) St. Cloud State vs. (5) Minnesota Duluth ====
March 10, 2023; 6:30 PM	St. Cloud State	3–1 (1–0, 1–1, 1–0)	Minnesota Duluth	Herb Brooks National Hockey Center; Attendance: 2,620

Game reference

Dominic Basse
Goalies
Zach Stejskal
Referees:
Joe Sullivan
Timm Walsh
Linesmen:
Dana Penkivech
Elliott Bucholz

(unassisted) Josh Luedtke (2) – 03:22	1–0
	1–1	32:20 – PP – Dominic James (9) (Kaiser, Steeves)
(Trejbal, Spellacy) Micah Miller (3) – GW – 38:11	2–1
(Bushy) Micah Miller (4) – EN – 58:33	3–1

6 min
Penalties
9 min
25
Shots
25

March 11, 2023; 5:00 PM	St. Cloud State	1–5 (1–1, 0–3, 0–1)	Minnesota Duluth	Herb Brooks National Hockey Center; Attendance: -

Game reference

Dominic Basse
Goalies
Zach Stejskal
Referees:
Joe Sullivan
Timm Walsh
Linesmen:
Dana Penkivech
Elliott Bucholz

(Kupka, Spellacy) Micah Miller (5) – 07:08	1–0
	1–1	12:40 – Carter Loney (3) (Bettens, Olson)
	1–2	23:00 – GW – Wyatt Kaiser (20) (Smith, Howard)
	1–3	26:17 – Ben Steeves (21) (James)
	1–4	26:33 – Dominic James (10) (Loheit, Kaiser)
	1–5	57:59 – EN – Carter Loney (20) (Bettens, Olson)

2 min
Penalties
4 min
35
Shots
23

March 12, 2023; 5:00 PM	St. Cloud State	3–1 (0–0, 3–1, 0–0)	Minnesota Duluth	Herb Brooks National Hockey Center; Attendance: -

Game reference

Jaxon Castor
Goalies
Zach Stejskal
Referees:
Joe Sullivan
Timm Walsh
Linesmen:
Dana Penkivech
Elliott Bucholz

	0–1	20:38 – PP – Luke Loheit (9) (James, Kaiser)
(Miettinen, Salquist) Cooper Wylie (2) – 26:10	1–1
(Salquist) Adam Ingram (7) – GW – 26:24	2–1
(Ahcan, Kupka) Grant Cruikshank (21) – 32:03	3–1

2 min
Penalties
2 min
32
Shots
37

St. Cloud State Won Series 2–1

=== Semifinals ===
==== (1) Denver vs. (7) Colorado College ====
March 17, 2023; 4:00 PM	Denver	0–1 (0–0, 0–1, 0–0)	Colorado College	Xcel Energy Center; Attendance: 10,242

Game reference
(out 49:28) Magnus Chrona (in 49:28) Matt Davis	Goalies	Kaidan Mbereko	Referees: Dan Dreger; Brandon Schmitt; Linesmen: Dana Penkivech; Jeff Schultz
0–1 / 33:22 – GW PP – Hunter McKown (21) (Andrews, Laba)			Referees: Dan Dreger; Brandon Schmitt; Linesmen: Dana Penkivech; Jeff Schultz
8 min	Penalties	8 min	Referees: Dan Dreger; Brandon Schmitt; Linesmen: Dana Penkivech; Jeff Schultz
23	Shots	26	Referees: Dan Dreger; Brandon Schmitt; Linesmen: Dana Penkivech; Jeff Schultz

==== (4) St. Cloud State vs. (6) North Dakota ====
March 17, 2023; 7:30 PM	St. Cloud State	3–2 (OT) (1–1, 0–1, 1–0, 1–0)	North Dakota	Xcel Energy Center; Attendance: 10,242

Game reference

Jaxon Castor
Goalies
Drew DeRidder
Referees:
Sterling Egan
Nathan Wieler
Linesmen:
Justin Hills
Erik Contino

	0–1	06:18 – PP – Ethan Frisch (9) (Schmaltz, Blake)
(Wylie, Cruikshank) Veeti Miettinen (11) – PP – 03:22	1–1
	1–2	32:29 – Judd Caulfield (9) (Senden, Hain)
(Okabe, Miettinen) Jami Krannila (20) – 45:06	2–2
(Krannila, Miettinen) Zach Okabe (17) – GW – 65:45	3–2

8 min
Penalties
10 min
21
Shots
25

=== Championship ===
==== (4) St. Cloud State vs. (7) Colorado College ====
March 18, 2023; 7:30 PM	St. Cloud State	3–0 (1–0, 0–0, 2–0)	Colorado College	Xcel Energy Center; Attendance: 6,877

Game reference

Jaxon Castor
Goalies
Kaidan Mbereko
Referees:
Joe Sullivan
Ryan Hersey
Linesmen:
John Grandt
Tyler Liffrig

(Okabe) Jami Krannila (21) – GW – 14:54	1–0
(Miller) Grant Cruikshank (22) – 42:43	2–0
(Cruikshank) Kyler Kupka (10) – 46:40	3–0

6 min
Penalties
2 min
26
Shots
17

== Tournament awards ==
=== Frozen Faceoff All-Tournament Team ===
- F: Jami Krannila* (St. Cloud State)
- F: Zach Okabe (St. Cloud State)
- F: Hunter McKown (Colorado College)
- D: Bryan Yoon (Colorado College)
- D: Jack Peart (St. Cloud State)
- G: Jaxon Castor (St. Cloud State)

* Most Valuable Player(s)
