= List of North Dakota Fighting Hawks men's ice hockey seasons =

This is a season-by-season list of records compiled by North Dakota in men's ice hockey.

The University of North Dakota has won eight NCAA Championships in its history, the most recent coming in 2016.

== Season-by-season results ==
Note: GP = Games played, W = Wins, L = Losses, T = Ties

NCAA D-I Champions	NCAA Frozen Four	Conference regular season champions	Conference Playoff Champions

Season	Conference	Regular Season (Note: Code explanation; GP—Games Played, W—Wins, L—Losses, T—Tied games, OTW—Overtime Wins, OTL—Overtime Loses, 3/SW—Win in 3 on 3 overtime or shootout, Pts—Points*)														Conference Tournament Results	National Tournament Results
Season	Conference	Conference									Overall					Conference Tournament Results	National Tournament Results
Season	Conference	GP	W	L	T	OTW	OTL	3/SW	Pts*	Finish	GP	W	L	T	%	Conference Tournament Results	National Tournament Results
Lawrence Quinn (1927–1928)
1927–28	Independent	–	–	–	–	–	–	–	–	–	4	0	1	3	.375	–	–
Program Suspended
Joe Brown (1929–1932)
1929–30	Independent	–	–	–	–	–	–	–	–	–	1	0	1	0	.000	–	–
1930–31	Independent	–	–	–	–	–	–	–	–	–	1	0	1	0	.000	–	–
1931–32	Independent	–	–	–	–	–	–	–	–	–	1	1	0	0	1.000	–	–
Noland Franz (1932–1933)
1932–33	Independent	–	–	–	–	–	–	–	–	–	9	1	8	0	.111	–	–
Program Suspended
Buck Cameron (1935–1936)
1935–36	Independent	–	–	–	–	–	–	–	–	–	4	2	2	0	.500	–	–
Program Suspended
John Jamieson (1946–1947)
1946–47	Independent	–	–	–	–	–	–	–	–	–	13	7	6	0	.538	–	–
Don Norman (1947–1949)
1947–48	Independent	–	–	–	–	–	–	–	–	–	16	11	5	0	.688	–	–
1948–49	Independent	–	–	–	–	–	–	–	–	–	22	9	12	1	.432	–	–
Fido Purpur (1949–1956)
1949–50	Independent	–	–	–	–	–	–	–	–	–	23	15	6	2	.696	–	–
1950–51	Independent	–	–	–	–	–	–	–	–	–	26	12	12	2	.500	–	–
1951–52	MCHL	12	6	6	0	–	–	–	12	4th	25	13	11	1	.540	–	–
1952–53	MCHL	16	11	5	0	–	–	–	17	3rd	20	15	5	0	.750	–	–
1953–54	WIHL	16	9	6	1	–	–	–	14½	3rd	27	14	12	1	.537	–	–
1954–55	WIHL	22	9	12	1	–	–	–	9½	6th	28	14	13	1	.518	–	–
1955–56	WIHL	20	7	13	0	–	–	–	10	T–5th	28	11	16	1	.411	–	–
Al Renfrew (1956–1957)
1956–57	WIHL	22	13	9	0	–	–	–	13	3rd	29	18	11	0	.621	–	–
Bob May (1957–1959)
1957–58	WIHL	20	15	5	0	–	–	–	16	T–1st	32	24	7	1	.675	–	Won Semifinal, 9–1 (Harvard); Lost National Championship, 2–6 (Denver)
1958–59	Independent	–	–	–	–	–	–	–	–	–	31	20	10	1	.661	–	Won Semifinal, 4–3 (Boston College); Won Championship, 4–3 (OT) (Michigan State)
Barry Thorndycraft (1959–1964)
1959–60	WCHA	22	14	7	1	–	–	–	.659	3rd	32	19	11	2	.625	Lost Finals series, 7–9 (Michigan Tech)	–
1960–61	WCHA	24	7	16	0	–	–	–	.304	5th	29	9	19	1	.328	–	–
1961–62	WCHA	18	7	11	0	–	–	–	.389	5th	26	9	17	0	.346	–	–
1962–63	WCHA	18	12	6	0	–	–	–	.667	T–1st	32	22	7	3	.734	Won First round series, 8–1 (Michigan Tech); Lost Final, 4–5 (OT) (Denver)	Won Semifinal, 8–2 (Boston College); Won Championship, 6–5 (Denver)
1963–64	WCHA	14	5	8	1	–	–	–	.393	5th	25	12	11	2	.520	Lost First round series, 6–9 (Denver)	–
University Division
Bob Peters (1964–1966)
1964–65	WCHA	16	13	3	0	–	–	–	.813	5th	33	25	8	0	.758	Won First round series, 11–7 (Michigan State); Lost Final, 4–6 (Michigan Tech)	Lost Semifinal, 3–4 (Boston College); Won Consolation Game, 9–5 (Brown)
1965–66	WCHA	22	13	9	0	–	–	–	.591	T–2nd	30	17	12	1	.583	Won First round, 4–3 (Minnesota); Lost Second round, 4–5 (OT) (Denver)	–
Bill Selman (1966–1968)
1966–67	WCHA	22	16	6	0	–	–	–	.727	1st	29	19	10	0	.655	Won First round, 7–2 (Minnesota); Won Second round, 3–2 (Denver)	Lost Semifinal, 0–1 (Cornell); Lost Third-place game, 1–6 (Michigan State)
1967–68	WCHA	22	13	8	1	–	–	–	.614	3rd	33	20	10	3	.652	Won First round, 5–2 (Michigan State); Won Second round, 3–2 (Michigan Tech)	Won Semifinal, 3–1 (Cornell); Lost Championship, 0–4 (Denver)
Rube Bjorkman (1968–1978)
1968–69	WCHA	22	15	7	0	–	–	–	.682	3rd	29	18	10	1	.638	Lost West regional semifinal, 4–5 (Colorado College)	–
1969–70	WCHA	26	12	13	1	–	–	–	.481	5th	30	14	15	1	.483	Lost West regional semifinal, 3–5 (Michigan Tech)	–
1970–71	WCHA	26	10	15	1	–	–	–	.404	7th	33	14	17	2	.455	Won East regional semifinal, 4–3 (Michigan State); Lost East Regional Final, 2–5 (Minnesota)	–
1971–72	WCHA	28	18	10	0	–	–	–	44	3rd	36	21	14	1	.597	Won First round series, 15–3 (Michigan); Lost Second round series, 2–6 (Wisconsin)	–
1972–73	WCHA	30	13	15	2	–	–	–	32	7th	36	17	17	2	.500	Lost First round series, 3–13 (Notre Dame)	–
Division I
1973–74	WCHA	28	8	20	0	–	–	–	16	10th	34	10	23	1	.309	–	–
1974–75	WCHA	32	4	26	2	–	–	–	10	10th	36	6	28	2	.194	–	–
1975–76	WCHA	32	12	20	0	–	–	–	24	T–7th	36	15	21	0	.417	–	–
1976–77	WCHA	32	16	16	0	–	–	–	12	5th	38	19	19	0	.500	Lost First round series, 5–15 (Denver)	–
1977–78	WCHA	32	13	19	0	–	–	–	26	T–5th	38	15	22	1	.408	Lost First round series, 4–5 (Michigan Tech)	–
Gino Gasparini (1978–1994)
1978–79	WCHA	32	22	10	0	–	–	–	44	T–1st	42	30	11	1	.726	Won First round series, 13–6 (Colorado College); Won Second round series, 11–9 (Wisconsin)	Won Semifinal, 4–2 (Dartmouth); Lost Championship, 3–4 (Minnesota)
1979–80	WCHA	28	21	6	1	–	–	–	.768	1st	40	31	8	1	.788	Won First round series, 13–4 (Michigan State); Won Second round series, 17–8 (Notre Dame)	Won Semifinal, 4–1 (Dartmouth); Won Championship, 5–2 (Northern Michigan)
1980–81	WCHA	28	14	12	2	–	–	–	30	T–5th	38	21	15	2	.579	Lost First round series, 5–11 (Michigan Tech)	–
1981–82	WCHA	26	19	7	0	–	–	–	38	1st	47	35	12	0	.745	Won Semifinal series, 9–5 (Denver); Lost Championship series, 1–12 (Wisconsin)	Won Quarterfinal series, 7–2 (Clarkson); Won Semifinal, 6–2 (Northeastern); Won Championship, 5–2 (Wisconsin)
1982–83	WCHA	26	16	9	1	–	–	–	33	2nd	36	21	13	2	.611	Lost Semifinal series, 6–7 (Wisconsin)	–
1983–84	WCHA	26	16	8	2	–	–	–	34	2nd	45	31	12	2	.711	Won Semifinal series, 9–7 (Minnesota); Lost Championship, 6–12 (Minnesota–Duluth)	Won Quarterfinal series, 9–6 (Rensselaer); Lost Semifinal, 1–2 (OT) (Minnesota–Duluth); Won Third-place game, 6–5 (OT) (Michigan State)
1984–85	WCHA	34	19	14	2	–	–	–	39	4th	42	24	16	2	.595	Won First round series, 15–5 (Denver); Lost Semifinal series, 8–10 (Minnesota–Duluth)	–
1985–86	WCHA	34	19	14	1	–	–	–	39	6th	41	24	16	1	.598	Lost First round series, 7–12 (Wisconsin)	–
1986–87	WCHA	35	29	6	0	–	–	–	58	1st	48	40	8	0	.833	Won First round series, 13–4 (Minnesota–Duluth); Won Semifinal series, 7–4 (Colorado College); Won Championship series, 10–6 (Minnesota)	Won Quarterfinal series, 9–4 (St. Lawrence); Won Semifinal, 5–2 (Harvard); Won Championship, 5–3 (Michigan State)
1987–88	WCHA	35	16	18	1	–	–	–	33	5th	42	21	20	1	.512	Won First round series, 2–1 (Michigan Tech); Lost Semifinal, 1–2 (Wisconsin); Won Third-place game, 6–0 (Minnesota–Duluth)	–
1988–89	WCHA	35	19	15	1	–	–	–	39	T–3rd	41	22	18	1	.549	Lost First round series, 1–2 (Denver)	–
1989–90	WCHA	28	15	10	3	–	–	–	33	3rd	45	28	13	4	.667	Won First round series, 2–0 (Minnesota–Duluth); Lost Semifinal, 4–5 (Minnesota); Won Third-place game, 6–5 (OT) (Northern Michigan)	Lost First round series, 1–2 (Boston University)
1990–91	WCHA	32	18	12	2	–	–	–	38	4th	43	24	17	2	.581	Won First round series, 2–1 (St. Cloud State); Lost Semifinal, 4–8 (Northern Michigan); Won Third-place game, 5–2 (Wisconsin)	–
1991–92	WCHA	32	12	19	1	–	–	–	25	T–7th	39	17	21	1	.461	Lost First round series, 1–2 (Minnesota)	–
1992–93	WCHA	32	11	20	1	–	–	–	23	8th	38	12	25	1	.329	Lost First round series, 0–2 (Minnesota)	–
1993–94	WCHA	32	11	17	4	–	–	–	26	8th	38	11	23	4	.342	Lost First round series, 0–2 (Wisconsin)	–
Dean Blais (1994–2004)
1994–95	WCHA	32	14	15	3	–	–	–	31	T–5th	39	18	18	3	.500	Won First round series, 2–0 (St. Cloud State); Lost Quarterfinal, 2–3 (Minnesota)	–
1995–96	WCHA	32	16	15	1	–	–	–	33	T–4th	38	19	18	1	.513	Lost First round series, 0–2 (Wisconsin)	–
1996–97	WCHA	32	21	10	1	–	–	–	43	T–1st	43	31	10	2	.744	Won First round series, 2–0 (Michigan Tech); Won Semifinal, 5–1 (Colorado College); Won Championship, 4–3 (OT) (Minnesota)	Won Regional semifinal, 6–2 (Cornell); Won National Semifinal, 6–2 (Colorado College); Won Championship, 6–4 (Boston University)
1997–98	WCHA	28	21	6	1	–	–	–	43	1st	39	30	8	1	.782	Won First round series, 2–0 (Mankato State); Won Semifinal, 4–3 (St. Cloud State); Lost Championship, 2–3 (Wisconsin)	Lost Regional semifinal, 3–4 (Michigan)
1998–99	WCHA	28	24	2	2	–	–	–	50	1st	40	32	6	2	.825	Won First round series, 2–1 (Mankato State); Won Semifinal, 6–2 (Minnesota); Lost Championship, 3–4 (Denver)	Lost Regional semifinal, 1–2 (Boston College)
1999–00	WCHA	28	17	6	5	–	–	–	39	2nd	44	31	8	5	.761	Won First round series, 2–1 (Denver); Won Semifinal, 7–3 (St. Cloud State); Won Championship, 5–3 (Wisconsin)	Won Regional semifinal, 4–1 (Niagara); Won National Semifinal, 2–0 (Maine); Won Championship, 4–2 (Boston College)
2000–01	WCHA	28	18	4	6	–	–	–	42	1st	46	29	8	9	.728	Won First round series, 2–1 (Minnesota–Duluth); Won Semifinal, 2–1 (Colorado College); Lost Championship, 5–6 (OT) (St. Cloud State)	Won Regional semifinal, 4–1 (Colorado College); Won National semifinal, 2–0 (Michigan State); Lost Championship, 2–3 (OT) (Boston College)
2001–02	WCHA	28	11	15	2	–	–	–	24	T–7th	37	16	19	2	.459	Lost First round series, 0–2 (Minnesota)	–
2002–03	WCHA	28	14	9	5	–	–	–	33	4th	43	26	12	5	.663	Won First round series, 2–1 (Denver); Lost Quarterfinal, 6–2 (Minnesota–Duluth)	Lost Regional semifinal, 2–5 (Ferris State)
2003–04	WCHA	28	20	5	3	–	–	–	43	1st	41	30	8	3	.667	Won First round series, 2–0 (Michigan Tech); Won Semifinal, 4–2 (Alaska–Anchorage); Lost Championship, 4–5 (Minnesota)	Won Regional semifinal, 3–0 (Holy Cross); Lost Regional Final, 0–1 (Denver)
Dave Hakstol (2004–2015)
2004–05	WCHA	28	13	12	3	–	–	–	29	5th	45	25	15	5	.611	Won First round series, 2–0 (Minnesota–Duluth); Won Quarterfinal, 3–1 (Wisconsin); Lost Semifinal, 1–2 (OT) (Denver); Won Third-place game, 4–2 (Minnesota)	Won Regional semifinal, 4–0 (Boston University); Won Regional Final, 6–3 (Boston College); Won National semifinal, 4–2 (Minnesota); Lost Championship, 1–4 (Denver)
2005–06	WCHA	28	16	12	0	–	–	–	32	T–4th	46	29	16	1	.641	Won First round series, 2–1 (Minnesota State); Won Semifinal, 4–3 (Wisconsin); Won Championship, 5–3 (St. Cloud State)	Won Regional semifinal, 5–1 (Michigan); Won Regional Final, 5–2 (Holy Cross); Lost National semifinal, 5–6 (Boston College)
2006–07	WCHA	28	14	7	7	–	–	–	31	3rd	43	24	14	5	.616	Won First round series, 2–0 (Minnesota State); Won Semifinal, 6–2 (St. Cloud State); Lost Championship, 2–3 (OT) (Minnesota)	Won Regional semifinal, 8–5 (Michigan); Won Regional Final, 3–2 (OT) (Minnesota); Lost National semifinal, 4–6 (Boston College)
2007–08	WCHA	28	18	7	3	–	–	–	39	2nd	43	28	11	4	.698	Won First round series, 2–1 (Michigan Tech); Lost Semifinal, 1–3 (Denver); Won Third-place game, 4–2 (Colorado College)	Won Regional semifinal, 5–1 (Princeton); Won Regional Final, 3–2 (OT) (Wisconsin); Lost National semifinal, 1–6 (Boston College)
2008–09	WCHA	28	17	7	4	–	–	–	38	1st	43	24	15	4	.605	Won First round series, 2–0 (Michigan Tech); Lost Semifinal, 0–3 (Minnesota–Duluth); Lost Third-place game, 1–4 (Wisconsin)	Lost Regional semifinal, 5–6 (OT) (New Hampshire)
2009–10	WCHA	28	15	10	3	–	–	–	33	T–4th	43	25	13	5	.640	Won First round series, 2–1 (Minnesota); Won Quarterfinal, 2–0 (Minnesota–Duluth); Won Semifinal, 4–3 (Denver); Won Championship, 5–3 (St. Cloud State)	Lost Regional semifinal, 2–3 (Yale)
2010–11	WCHA	28	21	6	1	–	–	–	43	1st	44	32	9	3	.761	Won First round series, 2–0 (Michigan Tech); Won Semifinal, 4–3 (Colorado College); Won Championship, 3–2 (2OT) (Denver)	Won Regional semifinal, 6–0 (Rensselaer); Won Regional Final, 6–1 (Denver); Lost National semifinal, 0–2 (Michigan)
2011–12	WCHA	28	16	11	1	–	–	–	33	4th	42	26	13	3	.655	Won First round series, 2–0 (Bemidji State); Won Quarterfinal, 4–1 (St. Cloud State); Won Semifinal, 6–3 (Minnesota); Won Championship, 4–0 (Denver)	Won Regional semifinal, 3–1 (Western Michigan); Lost Regional Final, 2–5 (Minnesota)
2012–13	WCHA	28	14	7	7	–	–	–	35	3rd	42	22	13	7	.607	Won First round series, 2–1 (Michigan Tech); Lost Quarterfinal, 3–4 (OT) (Colorado College)	Won Regional semifinal, 2–1 (Niagara); Lost Regional Final, 1–4 (Yale)
2013–14	NCHC	24	15	9	0	–	–	0	45	2nd	42	25	14	3	.631	Won Quarterfinal series, 2–1 (Colorado College); Lost Semifinal, 0–3 (Miami); Won Third-place game, 5–0 (Western Michigan)	Won Regional semifinal, 5–2 (Wisconsin); Won Regional Final, 2–1 (2OT) (Ferris State); Lost National semifinal, 1–2 (Minnesota)
2014–15	NCHC	24	16	6	2	–	–	0	50	1st	42	29	10	3	.726	Won Quarterfinal series, 2–0 (Colorado College); Lost Semifinal, 1–3 (St. Cloud State); Lost Third-place game, 1–5 (Denver)	Won Regional semifinal, 4–1 (Quinnipiac); Won Regional Final, 4–1 (St. Cloud State); Lost National semifinal, 3–5 (Boston University)
Brad Berry (2015–2025)
2015–16	NCHC	24	19	4	1	–	–	1	59	1st	44	34	6	4	.818	Won Quarterfinal series, 2–0 (Colorado College); Lost Semifinal, 2–4 (Minnesota–Duluth); Lost Third-place game, 1–4 (Denver)	Won Regional semifinal, 6–2 (Northeastern); Won Regional Final, 5–2 (Michigan); Won National semifinal, 4–2 (Denver); Won National Championship, 5–1 (Quinnipiac)
2016–17	NCHC	24	11	12	1	–	–	1	35	4th	40	21	16	3	.563	Won Quarterfinal series, 2–0 (St. Cloud State); Won Semifinal, 1–0 (Denver); Lost Championship, 3–4 (Minnesota–Duluth)	Lost Regional semifinal, 3–4 (OT) (Boston University)
2017–18	NCHC	24	8	10	6	–	–	3	33	4th	40	17	13	10	.550	Won First round series, 2–0 (Omaha); Lost Semifinal, 2–3 (OT) (St. Cloud State); Won Third-place game, 4–1 (Minnesota–Duluth)	–
2018–19	NCHC	24	12	11	1	–	–	0	37	5th	37	18	17	2	.514	Lost First round series, 0–2 (Denver)	–
2019–20	NCHC	24	17	4	3	–	–	2	56	1st	35	26	5	4	.800	Tournament cancelled due to COVID-19 pandemic	Tournament canceled due to COVID-19 pandemic
2020–21	NCHC	24	18	5	1	2	1	0	.750	1st	29	22	6	1	.776	Won Quarterfinal, 6–2 (Miami); Won Semifinal, 2–1 (OT) (Denver); Won Final, 5–3 (St. Cloud State)	Won Regional semifinal, 5–1 (American International); Lost Regional Final, 2–3 (5OT) (Minnesota Duluth)
2021–22	NCHC	24	17	6	1	1	1	1	53	T–1st	39	24	14	1	.628	Won Quarterfinal series, 2–0 (Colorado College); Lost Semifinal, 2–4 (Western Michigan)	Lost Regional semifinal, 1–2 (OT) (Notre Dame)
2022–23	NCHC	24	10	10	4	3	0	2	33	T–5th	39	18	15	6	.538	Won Quarterfinal series, 2–1 (Omaha); Lost Semifinal, 2–3 (OT) (St. Cloud State)	–
2023–24	NCHC	24	15	8	1	1	4	0	49	1st	40	26	12	2	.675	Won Quarterfinal series, 2–0 (Miami); Lost Semifinal, 3–6 (Omaha)	Lost Regional Semifinal, 3–4 (Michigan)
2024–25	NCHC	24	14	9	1	3	1	1	42	5th	38	21	15	2	.579	Won Quarterfinal series, 2–0 (Omaha); Lost Semifinal, 2–4 (Western Michigan)	–
Dane Jackson (2025–)
2025–26	NCHC	24	17	6	1	1	4	0	55	1st	40	29	10	1	.738	Won Quarterfinal series, 2–0 (Omaha); Lost Semifinal, 1–5 (Minnesota Duluth)	Won Regional Semifinal, 3–0 (Merrimack); Won Regional Final, 5–0 (Quinnipiac); Lost National Semifinal, 1–2 (Wisconsin)
2026–27	NCHC	Season in progress															
Totals											GP	W	L	T	%	Championships	
Regular Season											2634	1509	958	167	.605	15 MCHL/WIHL/WCHA Championships, 7 NCHC Championships	
Conference Post-season											207	123	77	7	.611	11 WCHA tournament championships, 1 NCHC tournament championship	
NCAA Post-season											85	55	39	0	.647	36 NCAA Tournament appearances	
Regular Season and Post-season Record											2926	1687	1065	174	.606	8 NCAA Division I National Championships	

* Winning percentage is used when conference schedules are unbalanced.
