= List of NCHC tournament champions =

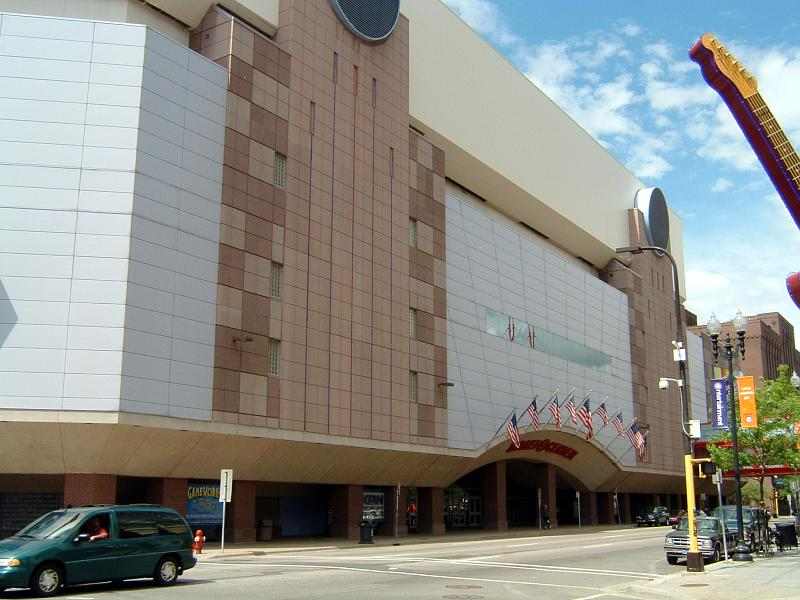
The Target Center hosted the inaugural NCHC tournament in 2014.

The National Collegiate Hockey Conference is a National Collegiate Athletic Association (NCAA) Division I ice hockey-only conference that was created during the 2014 NCAA Division I men's ice hockey conference realignment as a result of the formation of the Big Ten ice hockey conference.

The tournament began play in 2014 with an eight-team championship in three rounds. With the admission of Arizona State growing the NCHC to nine teams in the 2024–25 season, the team in ninth place in conference standings did not qualify for the tournament in 2024–25 or 2025–26 season.

The NCHC tournament features a first round round of best of three series hosted by the higher seed, with the four winners advancing to the Frozen Faceoff between 2014–2025.

The Frozen Faceoff was originally played at Target Center in Minneapolis, before moving to St. Paul's Xcel Energy Center beginning in 2018. Due to the COVID-19 pandemic, the tournament was cancelled in 2020 and hosted in its entirety by regular season champion North Dakota at the Ralph Engelstad Arena in 2021. The tournament's previously unnamed trophy was named the National Cup in September 2025.

The tournament moved entirely to campus sites starting in 2026. With St. Thomas' admission to the NCHC in 2026–27, all ten teams will once again make the tournament. Following first round best-of-three series, the re-seeded number four and five seeds will play at the site of the one seed, with the winner playing the one seed the following day.

== Champions ==
Year	Winning team	Coach	Losing team	Coach	Score	Location	Venue	Ref
2014	Denver	Jim Montgomery	Miami	Enrico Blasi	4–3	Minneapolis, Minnesota	Target Center	
2015	Miami	Enrico Blasi	St. Cloud State	Bob Motzko	3–2	Minneapolis, Minnesota	Target Center	
2016	St. Cloud State	Bob Motzko	Minnesota–Duluth	Scott Sandelin	3–1	Minneapolis, Minnesota	Target Center	
2017	Minnesota–Duluth	Scott Sandelin	North Dakota	Brad Berry	4–3	Minneapolis, Minnesota	Target Center	
2018	Denver (2)	Jim Montgomery	St. Cloud State	Bob Motzko	4–1	Saint Paul, Minnesota	Xcel Energy Center	
2019	Minnesota–Duluth (2)	Scott Sandelin	St. Cloud State	Brett Larson	3–2 ^{(2OT)}	Saint Paul, Minnesota	Xcel Energy Center	
2020	Cancelled due to the COVID-19 pandemic.							
2021	North Dakota	Brad Berry	St. Cloud State	Brett Larson	5–3	Grand Forks, North Dakota	Ralph Engelstad Arena	
2022	Minnesota Duluth (3)	Scott Sandelin	Western Michigan	Pat Ferschweiler	3–0	Saint Paul, Minnesota	Xcel Energy Center	
2023	St. Cloud State (2)	Brett Larson	Colorado College	Kris Mayotte	3–0	Saint Paul, Minnesota	Xcel Energy Center	
2024	Denver (3)	David Carle	Omaha	Mike Gabinet	4–1	Saint Paul, Minnesota	Xcel Energy Center	
2025	Western Michigan	Pat Ferschweiler	Denver	David Carle	4–3 ^{(2OT)}	Saint Paul, Minnesota	Xcel Energy Center	
2026	Denver (4)	David Carle	Minnesota Duluth	Scott Sandelin	4–3 ^{(2OT)}	Denver, Colorado	Magness Arena	

== Championships by School ==
School	Championships	Appearances	Win%
Denver	4	5	.800
Minnesota Duluth	3	5	.600
St. Cloud State	2	6	.333
North Dakota	1	2	.500
Miami	1	2	.500
Western Michigan	1	2	.500
Colorado College	0	1	.000
Omaha	0	1	.000
