= 2022–23 Western Michigan Broncos men's ice hockey season =

Great Lakes Invitational, Champion NCAA tournament, Regional Semifinal
- Conference: 2nd NCHC
- Home ice: Lawson Arena

Rankings
- USCHO: #11
- USA Today: #12

Record
- Overall: 23–15–1
- Conference: 15–8–1
- Home: 8–7–1
- Road: 12–7–0
- Neutral: 3–1–0

Coaches and captains
- Head coach: Pat Ferschweiler
- Assistant coaches: Jason Herter; J. J. Crew; Will Massey
- Captain: Jason Polin
- Alternate captain(s): Cole Gallant; Aidan Fulp

The 2022–23 Western Michigan Broncos men's ice hockey season was the 49th season of play for the program and 10th in the NCHC. The Broncos represented Western Michigan University in the 2022–23 NCAA Division I men's ice hockey season, were coached by Pat Ferschweiler in his second season, and played their home games at the Lawson Arena.

== Season ==
After the best season in program history and winning its first-ever NCAA tournament game, Western Michigan was immediately met with the task of remaking the team. Gone were the top 5 scorers from the year before as were all three goaltenders. WMU lost 15 players from the '22 team and, while several regular did return, the team's performance was an open question. Cameron Rowe, who had toiled in the Wisconsin goal for two years, was one of six transfers brought in to help make up for the brain drain but the team got probably their biggest contribution from freshman Ryan McAllister. The undrafted center immediately gelled with team captain Jason Polin and the two would prove to be one of the top duos in the nation.

The Broncos opened their season by travelling up to Anchorage to take on the restarted Seawolves program. With Alaska Anchorage playing their first game in over two-and-a-half years, they were not expected to do much even with the turnover for Western. However, the Seawolves defied expectations and won the first game. The Broncos' offense woke up after that stunner and won the next four games to try and undo the damage. At the end of the month, Western took on in-state rival Michigan in a battle between two high-scoring programs. The Broncos ended up scoring 9 goals in the two games but it was not enough as the Wolverines edged them out by a single goal both nights.

When WMU began its conference schedule very little changed for the team as they continued to play .500 hockey. The Music City Hockey Classic, which was scheduled to take place in Nashville on November 25, had to be moved to the Ford Ice Center Bellevue in nearby Bellevue, Tennessee. The change in venue was caused by a water main break at the Bridgestone Arena. After taking down Northeastern, the team stumbled to the break and sat just inside the pools but well out of the tournament in the PairWise rankings.

Western opened the second half of its season with the Great Lakes Invitational and faced a strong Michigan Tech squad to start. The Broncos blew the Huskies out of the water, romping to an 8–1 win. They had a near repeat in the championship game, pasting Ferris State 8–2. Polin netted hat-tricks in both games and shot into the lead for goals, scoring 18 in just 22 games. The massive wins also saw WMU race up the rankings, a trend that continued by winning their next 5 games and 9 out of 10 as well.

By the time mid-February rolled around, the Broncos were firing on all cylinders and gotten into the top 10. When they met Denver at the end of the month, Western was in the top 5 and had an outside chance to win the conference title if they could sweep the Pioneers. Unfortunately, Denver proved to a be a bit too tall of a task for the Broncos and they lost both games. The team recovered with an east match to end the season and finished second in the conference standings, Western's best finish in nearly 50 years. The high position gave the team a good match in the conference tournament as WMU played host to Colorado College.

Western's high-powered offense was sluggish against the Tigers. They were only able to get a single goal on the power play in the first two periods; however, they still left them with a lead going into the third. Over the span of 59 seconds, CC scored three times, more than they had scored in a single game in almost two months. The stunned Broncos were unable to recover in the last 5 minutes and ended with a loss. Even after that upset, the WMU offense did not appear much better in the rematch. The Broncos were able to score twice in regulation but could not edge out Colorado College and the two needed overtime to settle the score. Both teams went on the offensive in the extra session but, to the dismay of the home crowd, CC proved victorious and swept Western out of the conference tournament.

Luckily, the Broncos were high enough in the PairWise to be guaranteed a spot in the tournament and they had a week to try and get over the sudden ineptness of their offense. Once the tournament seeding was finalized, Western Michigan found itself with a 3 seed and set against Boston University. The very unfavorable draw resulted from the NCAA preventing inter-conference matches in the first round. In any event, Western was looking for its second tournament win and they started fast. WMU kept the pressure on BU for most of the first half of the period and were eventually able to scored the opening goal. However, while the team was celebrating, the referees were reviewing the tape and ended up taking the goal off the board due to goaltender interference. The change in momentum stalled Western Michigan and allowed the Terriers to go on the attack. A few minutes later BU score the first official goal of the game and then added 2 more by the midpoint of the second period. Jason Polin's 30th cut into the Terriers' lead but that was the only puck that the Broncos could get through the Boston University defense. For a team with the #5 offense in the nation, the sudden lack of scoring doomed the Broncos' season.

== Departures ==
Player	Position	Nationality	Cause
Alexandros Aslanidis	Goaltender	United States	Transferred to American International
Ronnie Attard	Defenseman	United States	Signed professional contract (Philadelphia Flyers)
Scooter Brickey	Defenseman	United States	Transferred to Ohio State
Brandon Bussi	Goaltender	United States	Signed professional contract (Boston Bruins)
Ethen Frank	Forward	United States	Graduation (signed with Hershey Bears)
Ty Glover	Forward	United Kingdom	Signed professional contract (Pittsburgh Penguins)
Xan Gurney	Defenseman	United States	Transferred to Long Island
Ross Hawryluk	Goaltender	Canada	Transferred to Manitoba
Michael Joyaux	Defenseman	United States	Graduation (signed with Toronto Marlies)
Jared Kucharek	Defenseman	United States	Graduate transfer to Lake Superior State
Josh Passolt	Forward	United States	Graduation (signed with Cincinnati Cyclones)
Matteo Pecchia	Forward	Canada	Transferred to Alaska
Nick Strom	Defenseman	United States	Transferred to Rensselaer
Jarred White	Forward	Canada	Transferred to Alaska Anchorage
Drew Worrad	Forward	Canada	Graduation (signed with Grand Rapids Griffins)

== Recruiting ==
Player	Position	Nationality	Age	Notes
Carter Berger	Defenseman	Canada	22	North Vancouver, BC; transfer from Connecticut; selected 106th overall in 2019
Barrett Brooks	Forward	United States	20	Stevens Point, WI
Cole Burtch	Forward	Canada	21	Markham, ON
Zak Galambos	Defenseman	United States	25	Walnut Creek, CA; transfer from American International
William Hambley	Goaltender	Canada	20	Cole Harbour, NS
Kirk Laursen	Goaltender	United States	22	Bloomfield Hills, MI; transfer from Miami
Oliver MacDonald	Forward	Canada	21	Grosse Pointe, MI; transfer from Massachusetts
Lucas Matta	Defenseman	Canada	19	Kleinburg, ON
Ryan McAllister	Forward	Canada	20	London, ON
Jack Perbix	Forward/Defenseman	United States	25	Elk River, MN; transfer from Minnesota; selected 116th overall in 2018
Cameron Rowe	Goaltender	United States	21	Wilmette, IL; transfer from Wisconsin
Samuel Sjölund	Defenseman	Sweden	21	Stockholm, Sweden; selected 111th overall in 2019
Theo Thrun	Forward	United States	21	Grand Rapids, MI
Ethan Wolthers	Forward	United States	21	Valencia, CA

== Roster ==
As of August 23, 2022.

No.	Nat.	Player	Class	Pos	Height	Weight	DoB	Hometown	Previous team	NHL rights
1	(United States)	Kirk Laursen	Freshman (RS)	G	6' 3" (1.91 m)	185 lb (84 kg)	2000-01-02	Bloomfield Hills, Michigan	Miami (NCHC)	—
2	(United States)	Jacob Bauer	Junior	D	6' 3" (1.91 m)	202 lb (92 kg)	2002-02-25	Milford, Michigan	Lincoln Stars (USHL)	—
4	(United States)	Zak Galambos	Senior	D	6' 2" (1.88 m)	190 lb (86 kg)	1997-05-27	Walnut Creek, California	American International (AHA)	—
6	(United States)	Theo Thrun	Freshman	F	5' 11" (1.8 m)	175 lb (79 kg)	2001-01-09	Grand Rapids, Michigan	Maine Nordiques (NAHL)	—
8	(Canada)	Ryan McAllister	Freshman	F	5' 10" (1.78 m)	185 lb (84 kg)	2001-12-19	London, Ontario	Brooks Bandits (AJHL)	—
9	(Canada)	Luke Grainger	Junior	F	5' 10" (1.78 m)	180 lb (82 kg)	1999-09-03	Montreal, Quebec	Hawkesbury Hawks (CCHL)	—
10	(United States)	Chad Hillebrand	Junior	F	6' 4" (1.93 m)	200 lb (91 kg)	1999-01-22	Park Ridge, Illinois	Green Bay Gamblers (USHL)	—
11	(United States)	Ethan Wolthers	Freshman	F	5' 8" (1.73 m)	155 lb (70 kg)	2001-07-19	Valencia, California	Minnesota Wilderness (NAHL)	—
12	(United States)	Cole Gallant	Graduate	F	5' 10" (1.78 m)	190 lb (86 kg)	1998-03-14	Dover, Florida	Omaha Lancers (USHL)	—
13	(United States)	Oliver MacDonald	Junior	F	5' 10" (1.78 m)	185 lb (84 kg)	2000-11-07	Grosse Pointe, Michigan	Massachusetts (HEA)	—
14	(United States)	Jason Polin	Senior	F	6' 0" (1.83 m)	198 lb (90 kg)	1999-06-17	Holt, Michigan	Cedar Rapids RoughRiders (USHL)	—
15	(Canada)	Daniel Hilsendager	Junior	D	6' 1" (1.85 m)	200 lb (91 kg)	2000-03-30	Lloydminster, Saskatchewan	Omaha Lancers (USHL)	—
16	(United States)	Tim Washe	Junior	F	6' 3" (1.91 m)	210 lb (95 kg)	2001-08-25	Detroit, Michigan	Nanaimo Clippers (BCHL)	—
17	(Switzerland)	Cédric Fiedler	Junior	D	6' 3" (1.91 m)	204 lb (93 kg)	2001-04-20	Zug, Switzerland	Fargo Force (USHL)	—
18	(United States)	Wyatt Schingoethe	Sophomore	F	5' 11" (1.8 m)	180 lb (82 kg)	2002-08-03	Algonquin, Illinois	Waterloo Black Hawks (USHL)	TOR, 195th overall 2020
19	(United States)	Cam Knuble	Junior	F	6' 0" (1.83 m)	200 lb (91 kg)	2000-07-23	Grand Rapids, Michigan	Muskegon Lumberjacks (USHL)	—
20	(Canada)	Jamie Rome	Graduate	F	6' 2" (1.88 m)	211 lb (96 kg)	1998-10-03	Cochrane, Alberta	Victoria Grizzlies (BCHL)	—
21	(United States)	Barrett Brooks	Freshman	F	5' 8" (1.73 m)	170 lb (77 kg)	2001-12-19	Stevens Point, Wisconsin	Austin Bruins (NAHL)	—
22	(United States)	Trevor Bishop	Junior	F	6' 0" (1.83 m)	185 lb (84 kg)	1999-01-23	Rochester Hills, Michigan	Victoria Grizzlies (BCHL)	—
23	(Canada)	Carter Berger	Senior	D	6' 0" (1.83 m)	185 lb (84 kg)	1999-09-17	North Vancouver, British Columbia	Connecticut (HEA)	FLA, 106th overall 2019
24	(United States)	Aidan Fulp	Junior	D	6' 3" (1.91 m)	210 lb (95 kg)	2000-02-29	Westfield, Indiana	Dubuque Fighting Saints (USHL)	—
25	(United States)	Jack Perbix	Senior	F	6' 1" (1.85 m)	185 lb (84 kg)	2000-09-13	Elk River, Minnesota	Minnesota (Big Ten)	ANA, 116th overall 2018
26	(Canada)	Lucas Matta	Freshman	D	6' 2" (1.88 m)	185 lb (84 kg)	2002-10-04	Kleinburg, Ontario	Salmon Arm Silverbacks (BCHL)	—
27	(Canada)	Cole Burtch	Freshman	F	5' 10" (1.78 m)	170 lb (77 kg)	2001-01-11	Markham, Ontario	Cedar Rapids RoughRiders (USHL)	—
28	(United States)	Hugh Larkin	Junior	F	6' 2" (1.88 m)	205 lb (93 kg)	1999-03-27	Livonia, Michigan	Austin Bruins (NAHL)	—
29	(Canada)	Will Hambley	Freshman	G	6' 3" (1.91 m)	190 lb (86 kg)	2002-04-29	Cole Harbour, Nova Scotia	Steinbach Pistons (MJHL)	—
31	(United States)	Cameron Rowe	Junior	G	6' 3" (1.91 m)	210 lb (95 kg)	2001-06-01	Wilmette, Illinois	Wisconsin (Big Ten)	—
33	(Sweden)	Samuel Sjölund	Freshman	D	6' 1" (1.85 m)	175 lb (79 kg)	2001-05-19	Stockholm, Sweden	Dubuque Fighting Saints (USHL)	DAL, 111th overall 2019
34	(United States)	Max Sasson	Sophomore	F	6' 1" (1.85 m)	185 lb (84 kg)	2000-09-05	Birmingham, Michigan	Waterloo Black Hawks (USHL)	—
37	(United States)	Dylan Wendt	Sophomore	F	6' 1" (1.85 m)	185 lb (84 kg)	2001-01-09	Grand Haven, Michigan	Muskegon Lumberjacks (USHL)	—

== Standings ==
2022–23 National Collegiate Hockey Conference Standings
	Conference record										Overall record					
	GP	W	L	T	OTW	OTL	SW	PTS	GF	GA	GP	W	L	T	GF	GA
#6 Denver †	24	19	5	0	2	1	0	56	94	53	40	30	10	0	150	86
#11 Western Michigan	24	15	8	1	2	0	0	44	86	60	39	23	15	1	148	102
#20 Omaha	24	13	9	2	2	2	1	42	71	64	37	19	15	3	109	97
#5 St. Cloud State *	24	12	9	3	2	1	3	41	85	68	41	25	13	3	133	95
Minnesota Duluth	24	10	14	0	1	4	0	33	65	81	37	16	20	1	95	114
#17 North Dakota	24	10	10	4	3	0	2	33	75	70	39	18	15	6	127	110
Colorado College	24	6	15	3	0	2	2	25	37	60	38	13	22	3	79	99
Miami	24	3	18	3	0	2	0	14	39	96	36	8	24	4	73	137
Championship: March 18, 2023 † indicates conference regular season champion (Penrose Cup) * indicates conference tournament champion (Frozen Faceoff Championship Trophy); Rankings: USCHO.com Top 20 Poll

== Schedule and results ==
Date	Time	Opponent^{#}	Rank^{#}	Site	TV	Decision	Result	Attendance	Record
Regular Season
October 1	10:07 PM	at Alaska Anchorage*	#14	Seawolf Sports Complex • Anchorage, Alaska		Rowe	L 1–3	830	0–1–0
October 2	9:07 PM	at Alaska Anchorage*	#14	Seawolf Sports Complex • Anchorage, Alaska		Laursen	W 4–1	821	1–1–0
October 8	7:07 PM	at Ferris State*	#18	Ewigleben Arena • Big Rapids, Michigan	FloHockey	Rowe	W 6–4	1,604	2–1–0
October 13	7:00 PM	Bowling Green*	#18	Lawson Arena • Kalamazoo, Michigan		Rowe	W 4–1	2,912	3–1–0
October 15	7:07 PM	at Bowling Green*	#18	Slater Family Ice Arena • Bowling Green, Ohio	FloHockey	Rowe	W 8–2	2,816	4–1–0
October 21	7:00 PM	at #13 Notre Dame*	#17	Compton Family Ice Arena • Notre Dame, Indiana		Rowe	L 0–2	5,096	4–2–0
October 22	6:00 PM	#13 Notre Dame*	#17	Lawson Arena • Kalamazoo, Michigan		Rowe	W 4–0	3,224	5–2–0
October 28	7:00 PM	at #4 Michigan*	#17	Yost Ice Arena • Ann Arbor, Michigan		Rowe	L 4–5	5,800	5–3–0
October 29	6:00 PM	#4 Michigan*	#17	Lawson Arena • Kalamazoo, Michigan		Rowe	L 5–6 ^{OT}	4,090	5–4–0
November 4	7:00 PM	Miami	#18	Lawson Arena • Kalamazoo, Michigan		Rowe	W 7–1	3,053	6–4–0 (1–0–0)
November 5	6:00 PM	Miami	#18	Lawson Arena • Kalamazoo, Michigan		Rowe	W 5–2	3,528	7–4–0 (2–0–0)
November 11	8:30 PM	at #4 St. Cloud State	#17	Herb Brooks National Hockey Center • St. Cloud, Minnesota	FOX 9+	Rowe	W 4–2	3,557	8–4–0 (3–0–0)
November 12	7:00 PM	at #4 St. Cloud State	#17	Herb Brooks National Hockey Center • St. Cloud, Minnesota	FOX 9+	Rowe	L 1–4	4,152	8–5–0 (3–1–0)
November 18	7:00 PM	Minnesota Duluth	#14	Lawson Arena • Kalamazoo, Michigan		Rowe	L 4–5	2,753	8–6–0 (3–2–0)
November 19	6:00 PM	Minnesota Duluth	#14	Lawson Arena • Kalamazoo, Michigan		Rowe	W 5–3	3,294	9–6–0 (4–2–0)
November 25	7:30 PM	vs. #18 Northeastern*	#15	Ford Ice Center Bellevue • Bellevue, Tennessee (Music City Hockey Classic)		Rowe	W 6–4	1,272	10–6–0
December 2	8:07 PM	at Omaha	#14	Baxter Arena • Omaha, Nebraska		Laursen	L 6–7	6,623	10–7–0 (4–3–0)
December 3	8:07 PM	at Omaha	#14	Baxter Arena • Omaha, Nebraska		Rowe	L 1–3	6,766	10–8–0 (4–4–0)
December 9	7:00 PM	North Dakota	#17	Lawson Arena • Kalamazoo, Michigan		Rowe	T 2–2 ^{SOL}	3,239	10–8–1 (4–4–1)
December 10	6:00 PM	North Dakota	#17	Lawson Arena • Kalamazoo, Michigan		Rowe	L 0–3	3,498	10–9–1 (4–5–1)
Great Lakes Invitational
December 27	3:30 PM	vs. #17 Michigan Tech*	#18	Van Andel Arena • Grand Rapids, Michigan (Great Lakes Invitational Semifinal)		Rowe	W 8–1	-	11–9–1
December 28	7:00 PM	vs. Ferris State*	#18	Van Andel Arena • Grand Rapids, Michigan (Great Lakes Invitational Championship)		Rowe	W 8–2	6,486	12–9–1
Regular Season
January 13	8:07 PM	at North Dakota	#12	Ralph Engelstad Arena • Grand Forks, North Dakota	Midco	Rowe	W 4–0	11,022	13–9–1 (5–5–1)
January 14	7:07 PM	at North Dakota	#12	Ralph Engelstad Arena • Grand Forks, North Dakota	Midco	Rowe	W 7–6	11,664	14–9–1 (6–5–1)
January 20	9:30 PM	at Colorado College	#10	Ed Robson Arena • Colorado Springs, Colorado	ATTRM	Rowe	W 4–1	3,408	15–9–1 (7–5–1)
January 21	8:00 PM	at Colorado College	#10	Ed Robson Arena • Colorado Springs, Colorado		Rowe	W 4–1	3,407	16–9–1 (8–5–1)
January 27	7:00 PM	Omaha	#9	Lawson Arena • Kalamazoo, Michigan		Rowe	W 6–1	3,872	17–9–1 (9–5–1)
January 28	6:00 PM	Omaha	#9	Lawson Arena • Kalamazoo, Michigan		Rowe	L 0–2	3,924	17–10–1 (9–6–1)
February 3	8:00 PM	at Minnesota Duluth	#10	AMSOIL Arena • Duluth, Minnesota	MY9	Rowe	W 3–2 ^{OT}	6,316	18–10–1 (10–6–1)
February 4	7:00 PM	at Minnesota Duluth	#10	AMSOIL Arena • Duluth, Minnesota	MY9	Rowe	W 4–1	6,391	19–10–1 (11–6–1)
February 17	7:00 PM	Colorado College	#8	Lawson Arena • Kalamazoo, Michigan		Rowe	W 4–1	3,585	20–10–1 (12–6–1)
February 18	6:00 PM	Colorado College	#8	Lawson Arena • Kalamazoo, Michigan		Rowe	W 2–1	3,761	21–10–1 (13–6–1)
February 24	7:00 PM	#3 Denver	#5	Lawson Arena • Kalamazoo, Michigan	CBSSN	Rowe	L 2–5	3,947	21–11–1 (13–7–1)
February 25	6:00 PM	#3 Denver	#5	Lawson Arena • Kalamazoo, Michigan		Rowe	L 1–3	4,419	21–12–1 (13–8–1)
March 3	7:05 PM	at Miami	#8	Steve Cady Arena • Oxford, Ohio		Rowe	W 5–0	1,955	22–12–1 (14–8–1)
March 4	5:05 PM	at Miami	#8	Steve Cady Arena • Oxford, Ohio		Rowe	W 5–4 ^{OT}	2,486	23–12–1 (15–8–1)
NCHC Tournament
March 10	5:00 PM	Colorado College*	#7	Lawson Arena • Kalamazoo, Michigan (Quarterfinal Game 1)		Rowe	L 1–3	3,218	23–13–1
March 11	4:00 PM	Colorado College*	#7	Lawson Arena • Kalamazoo, Michigan (Quarterfinal Game 2)		Rowe	L 2–3 ^{OT}	3,557	23–14–1
NCAA Tournament
March 23	2:00 PM	vs. #5 Boston University*	#9	SNHU Arena • Manchester, New Hampshire (East Regional Semifinal)	ESPNU	Rowe	L 1–5	3,631	23–15–1
*Non-conference game. ^{#}Rankings from USCHO.com Poll. All times are in Eastern Time. Source:

== Scoring statistics ==
Name	Position	Games	Goals	Assists	Points	PIM
Ryan McAllister	C	39	13	36	49	14
Jason Polin	RW	39	30	17	47	13
Max Sasson	C	38	15	27	42	18
Luke Grainger	F	38	12	20	32	12
Zak Galambos	D	39	11	18	29	34
Cole Gallant	RW	39	6	18	24	4
Carter Berger	D	33	5	18	23	16
Dylan Wendt	F	39	8	14	22	4
Jack Perbix	RW/D	39	6	13	19	18
Tim Washe	C	39	7	11	18	54
Jamie Rome	F	30	9	7	16	8
Chad Hillebrand	F	32	7	9	16	37
Aidan Fulp	D	38	2	13	15	24
Hugh Larkin	RW	38	6	8	14	24
Cédric Fiedler	D	39	3	7	10	17
Daniel Hilsendager	D	39	2	5	7	12
Jacob Bauer	D	38	2	5	7	10
Ethan Wolthers	F	13	2	3	5	2
Oliver MacDonald	F	19	0	3	3	6
Wyatt Schingoethe	C	8	1	1	2	2
Cam Knuble	F	30	1	0	1	4
Cameron Rowe	G	38	0	1	1	0
Trevor Bishop	F	26	0	0	0	0
Lucas Matta	D	6	0	0	0	0
Kirk Laursen	G	4	0	0	0	0
Total			148	254	402	333

== Goaltending statistics ==
Name	Games	Minutes	Wins	Losses	Ties	Goals against	Saves	Shut-outs	SV %	GAA
Cameron Rowe	38	2210:15	22	14	1	92	884	3	.906	2.50
Kirk Laursen	5	116:44	1	1	0	6	29	0	.829	3.08
Empty Net	-	27:29	-	-	-	4	-	-	-	-
Total	39	2354:28	23	16	1	102	913	3	.900	2.60

== Rankings ==
Poll	Week																											
Poll	Pre	1	2	3	4	5	6	7	8	9	10	11	12	13	14	15	16	17	18	19	20	21	22	23	24	25	26	27 (Final)
USCHO.com	14	-	18	18	17	17	18	17	14	15	14	17	18	-	13	12	10	9	10	9	8	5	8	7	9	9	-	11
USA Today	12	12	18	18	17	16	18	17	12	15	14	17	19	19	14	12	10	9	10	9	8	5	8	8	9	11	11	12

Note: USCHO did not release a poll in weeks 1, 13, or 26.

== Awards and honors ==
Player	Award	Ref
Jason Polin	AHCA West All-American Second Team	
Jason Polin	NCHC Player of the Year	
Jason Polin	NCHC Forward of the Year	
Pat Ferschweiler	Herb Brooks Coach of the Year	
Jason Polin	NCHC First Team	
Ryan McAllister	NCHC Rookie Team	

== Players drafted into the NHL ==
=== 2023 NHL entry draft ===
Round	Pick	Player	NHL team
3	82	Zach Nehring ^{†}	Winnipeg Jets
6	183	Ty Henricks ^{†}	New York Rangers

† incoming freshman
