= 2017–18 North Dakota Fighting Hawks men's ice hockey season =

- Conference: 4th NCHC
- Home ice: Ralph Engelstad Arena

Rankings
- USCHO.com: 17
- USA Today/ US Hockey Magazine: NR

Record
- Overall: 17-13-10
- Conference: 8-10-6-3
- Home: 10-5-6
- Road: 6-7-4
- Neutral: 1–1-0

Coaches and captains
- Head coach: Brad Berry
- Assistant coaches: Dane Jackson; Matt Shaw; Matt Hrynkiw
- Captain: Austin Poganski
- Alternate captain(s): Trevor Olson; Rhett Gardner; Johnny Simonson

The 2017–18 North Dakota Fighting Hawks men's ice hockey season was the 78th season of play for the program and the 5th in the NCHC conference. The Fighting Hawks represented the University of North Dakota and were coached by Brad Berry, in his 3rd season.

== Roster ==
As of September 8, 2017.

| No. | Nat. | Player | Class | Pos | Height | Weight | DoB | Hometown | Previous team | NHL rights |
|---|---|---|---|---|---|---|---|---|---|---|
| 1 | | Peter Thome | Freshman | G | 6' 4" (1.93 m) | 205 lb (93 kg) | 1997-05-24 | Minneapolis, Minnesota | Waterloo Black Hawks (USHL) | CBJ, 155th overall 2016 |
| 2 | | Gabe Bast | Freshman | D | 5' 10" (1.78 m) | 195 lb (88 kg) | 1996-12-20 | Red Deer, Alberta | Penticton Vees (BCHL) | — |
| 3 | | Matt Kiersted | Freshman | D | 6' 0" (1.83 m) | 180 lb (82 kg) | 1998-04-14 | Elk River, Minnesota | Chicago Steel (USHL) | — |
| 4 | | Andrew Peski | Sophomore | D | 6' 0" (1.83 m) | 211 lb (96 kg) | 1997-03-11 | Ottawa, Ontario | Tri-City Storm (USHL) | — |
| 5 | | Casey Johnson | Sophomore | D | 6' 2" (1.88 m) | 200 lb (91 kg) | 1996-04-12 | Grand Forks, North Dakota | Dubuque Fighting Saints (USHL) | — |
| 6 | | Colton Poolman | Sophomore | D | 6' 1" (1.85 m) | 194 lb (88 kg) | 1995-12-18 | East Grand Forks, Minnesota | Penticton Vees (BCHL) | — |
| 7 | | Zach Yon | Sophomore | F | 6' 0" (1.83 m) | 191 lb (87 kg) | 1995-12-30 | Roseau, Minnesota | Waterloo Black Hawks (USHL) | — |
| 8 | | Nick Jones | Junior | F | 5' 11" (1.8 m) | 175 lb (79 kg) | 1996-06-02 | Edmonton, Alberta | Penticton Vees (BCHL) | — |
| 9 | | Dixon Bowen | Sophomore | F | 5' 11" (1.8 m) | 184 lb (83 kg) | 1996-05-05 | East Grand Forks, Minnesota | Penticton Vees (BCHL) | — |
| 10 | | Johnny Simonson (A) | Freshman | F | 5' 10" (1.78 m) | 176 lb (80 kg) | 1993-06-16 | Grand Forks, North Dakota | Lincoln Stars (USHL) | — |
| 11 | | Trevor Olson (A) | Senior | F | 6' 2" (1.88 m) | 198 lb (90 kg) | 1993-11-22 | Duluth, Minnesota | Sioux City Musketeers (USHL) | — |
| 14 | | Austin Poganski (C) | Senior | F | 6' 2" (1.88 m) | 210 lb (95 kg) | 1996-02-16 | Saint Cloud, Minnesota | Tri-City Storm (USHL) | STL, 110th overall 2014 |
| 16 | | Grant Mismash | Freshman | F | 6' 0" (1.83 m) | 190 lb (86 kg) | 1999-02-19 | Edina, Minnesota | USNTDP (USHL) | NSH, 61st overall 2017 |
| 18 | | Collin Adams | Freshman | F | 5' 9" (1.75 m) | 185 lb (84 kg) | 1998-04-24 | Brighton, Michigan | Muskegon Lumberjacks (USHL) | NYI, 170th overall 2016 |
| 19 | | Shane Gersich | Junior | F | 6' 0" (1.83 m) | 187 lb (85 kg) | 1996-07-10 | Chaska, Minnesota | Omaha Lancers (USHL) | WSH, 134th overall 2014 |
| 20 | | Josh Rieger | Freshman | D | 6' 0" (1.83 m) | 185 lb (84 kg) | 1996-04-02 | Regina, Saskatchewan | Estevan Bruins (SJHL) | — |
| 22 | | Rhett Gardner (A) | Senior | F | 6' 3" (1.91 m) | 220 lb (100 kg) | 1996-02-28 | Moose Jaw, Saskatchewan | Okotoks Oilers (AJHL) | DAL, 116th overall 2016 |
| 24 | | Christian Wolanin | Junior | D | 6' 1" (1.85 m) | 192 lb (87 kg) | 1995-03-17 | Quebec City, Quebec | Muskegon Lumberjacks (USHL) | OTT, 107th overall 2015 |
| 25 | | Joel Janatuinen | Junior | F | 6' 0" (1.83 m) | 190 lb (86 kg) | 1995-02-02 | Espoo, Finland | Sioux City Musketeers (USHL) | — |
| 26 | | Cole Smith | Sophomore | F | 6' 3" (1.91 m) | 200 lb (91 kg) | 1995-12-18 | Brainerd, Minnesota | Steinbach Pistons (MJHL) | — |
| 27 | | Ludvig Hoff | Sophomore | F | 5' 10" (1.78 m) | 195 lb (88 kg) | 1996-10-16 | Oslo, Norway | Lincoln Stars (USHL) | — |
| 28 | | Hayden Shaw | Junior | D | 5' 11" (1.8 m) | 195 lb (88 kg) | 1996-06-05 | Woodbury, Minnesota | Dubuque Fighting Saints (USHL) | — |
| 29 | | Jordan Kawaguchi | Freshman | F | 5' 9" (1.75 m) | 185 lb (84 kg) | 1997-05-04 | Abbotsford, British Columbia | Chilliwack Chiefs (BCHL) | — |
| 33 | | Cam Johnson | Senior | G | 6' 2" (1.88 m) | 200 lb (91 kg) | 1994-07-11 | Troy, Michigan | Waterloo Blackhawks (USHL) | — |
| 35 | | Ryan Anderson | Junior | G | 6' 2" (1.88 m) | 205 lb (93 kg) | 1995-10-01 | Roseau, Minnesota | Minnesota Wilderness (NAHL) | — |

== Standings ==
2017–18 National Collegiate Hockey Conference standings
| | Conference record | | | | | | | | Overall record | | | | | |
| | GP | W | L | T | SOW | PTS | GF | GA | GP | W | L | T | GF | GA |
|---|---|---|---|---|---|---|---|---|---|---|---|---|---|---|
| #6 St. Cloud State † | 24 | 16 | 4 | 4 | 1 | 53 | 93 | 59 | 40 | 25 | 9 | 6 | 144 | 101 |
| #5 Denver* | 24 | 12 | 6 | 6 | 4 | 46 | 76 | 53 | 41 | 23 | 10 | 8 | 135 | 86 |
| #1 Minnesota–Duluth | 24 | 13 | 11 | 0 | 0 | 39 | 79 | 56 | 42 | 25 | 16 | 3 | 132 | 92 |
| #17 North Dakota | 24 | 8 | 10 | 6 | 3 | 33 | 71 | 68 | 40 | 17 | 13 | 10 | 117 | 95 |
| Omaha | 24 | 10 | 13 | 1 | 0 | 31 | 75 | 97 | 36 | 17 | 17 | 2 | 121 | 134 |
| Western Michigan | 24 | 10 | 13 | 1 | 0 | 31 | 82 | 94 | 36 | 15 | 19 | 2 | 115 | 129 |
| Colorado College | 24 | 8 | 12 | 4 | 3 | 31 | 63 | 85 | 37 | 15 | 17 | 5 | 99 | 121 |
| Miami | 24 | 6 | 14 | 4 | 2 | 24 | 62 | 89 | 37 | 12 | 20 | 5 | 103 | 128 |
Championship: March 17, 2018 † indicates conference regular season champion; * indicates conference tournament champion Rankings: USCHO.com Top 20 Poll; updated March 5, 2018

== Schedule and results ==
| Date | Time | Opponent^{#} | Rank^{#} | Site | TV | Decision | Result | Attendance | Record |
Exhibition
| September 30 | 7:07 PM | vs. Manitoba* | #7 | Ralph Engelstad Arena • Grand Forks, North Dakota (Exhibition) | | Johnson | W 6-2 | | — |
Regular season
| October 6 | 10:07 PM | at Alaska-Anchorage* | #7 | Sullivan Arena • Anchorage, Alaska | | Johnson | T 1-1 ^{OT} | 2,563 | 0-0-1 (0-0-0-0) |
| October 7 | 10:07 PM | vs. Alaska-Anchorage* | #7 | Sullivan Arena • Anchorage, Alaska | | Johnson | W 3-2 ^{OT} | 2,506 | 1-0-1 (0-0-0-0) |
| October 13 | 7:37 PM | vs. St. Lawrence* | #8 | Ralph Engelstad Arena • Grand Forks, North Dakota | | Johnson | W 2-1 | 11,221 | 2-0-1 (0-0-0-0) |
| October 14 | 7:07 PM | vs. St. Lawrence* | #8 | Ralph Engelstad Arena • Grand Forks, North Dakota | | Johnson | W 6-1 | 11,599 | 3-0-1 (0-0-0-0) |
| October 20 | 7:37 PM | vs. #8 Minnesota* | #4 | Ralph Engelstad Arena • Grand Forks, North Dakota | | Johnson | L 1-2 | 11,862 | 3-1-1 (0-0-0-0) |
| October 21 | 7:07 PM | vs. #8 Minnesota* | #4 | Ralph Engelstad Arena • Grand Forks, North Dakota | | Johnson | W 4-0 | 11,890 | 4-1-1 (0-0-0-0) |
| October 27 | 8:37 PM | at Colorado College | #4 | Colorado Springs World Arena • Colorado Springs, Colorado | | Johnson | L 1-2 | 4,525 | 4-2-1 (0-1-0-0) |
| October 28 | 7:07 PM | at Colorado College | #4 | Colorado Springs World Arena • Colorado Springs, Colorado | | Johnson | W 6-4 | 4,887 | 5-2-1 (1–1–0–0) |
| November 3 | 7:07 PM | at #7 Wisconsin* | #4 | Kohl Center • Madison, Wisconsin | FSW+ | Thome | W 3-2 | 9,597 | 6-2-1 (1–1–0–0) |
| November 4 | 7:07 PM | at #7 Wisconsin* | #4 | Kohl Center • Madison, Wisconsin | FSW | Thome | T 2-2 ^{OT} | 12,409 | 6-2-2 (1-1-0-0) |
| November 10 | 7:37 PM | vs. Miami | #2 | Ralph Engelstad Arena • Grand Forks, North Dakota | | Thome | W 4-1 | 11,389 | 7-2-2 (2-1-0-0) |
| November 11 | 7:07 PM | vs. Miami | #17 | Ralph Engelstad Arena • Grand Forks, North Dakota | | Thome | T 3-3 ^{SOW} | 11,795 | 7-2-3 (2-1-1-1) |
| November 17 | 8:05 PM | at #1 Denver | #3 | Magness Arena • Denver, Colorado | | Thome | W 5-4 | 6,026 | 8-2-3 (3-1-1-1) |
| November 18 | 8:05 PM | at #1 Denver | #3 | Magness Arena • Denver, Colorado | | Thome | L 1-4 | 6,319 | 8-3-3 (3-2-1-1) |
| November 24 | 7:37 PM | vs. Union* | #3 | Ralph Engelstad Arena • Grand Forks, North Dakota | | Thome | L 1-4 | 11,087 | 8-4-3 (3-2-1-1) |
| November 25 | 7:07 PM | vs. Union* | #3 | Ralph Engelstad Arena • Grand Forks, North Dakota | | Thome | T 2-2 ^{OT} | 11,289 | 8-4-4 (3-2-1-1) |
| December 1 | 7:37 PM | vs. #10 Western Michigan | #6 | Ralph Engelstad Arena • Grand Forks, North Dakota | | Johnson | W 4-3 | 11,156 | 9-4-4 (4-2-1-1) |
| December 2 | 7:07 PM | vs. #10 Western Michigan | #6 | Ralph Engelstad Arena • Grand Forks, North Dakota | | Johnson | W 4-1 | 11,742 | 10-4-4 (5-2-1-1) |
| December 8 | 7:37 PM | at #2 St. Cloud State | #5 | Herb Brooks National Hockey Center • St. Cloud, Minnesota | FSN | Johnson | T 2-2 ^{SOW} | 4,631 | 10-4-5 (5-2-2-2) |
| December 9 | 7:07 PM | at #2 St. Cloud State | #5 | Herb Brooks National Hockey Center • St. Cloud, Minnesota | FSN | Johnson | L 1-3 | 5,676 | 10-5-5 (5-3-2-2) |
| December 30 | 7:07 PM | vs. USNTDP | #6 | Ralph Engelstad Arena • Grand Forks, North Dakota (Exhibition) | | | W 5-2 | | — |
| January 5 | 7:37 PM | vs. #18 Omaha | #6 | Ralph Engelstad Arena • Grand Forks, North Dakota | CBSSN | Johnson | L 1-4 | 10,133 | 10-6-5 (5-4-2-2) |
| January 6 | 7:07 PM | vs. #18 Omaha | #6 | Ralph Engelstad Arena • Grand Forks, North Dakota | | Thome | W 7-0 | 10,816 | 11-6-5 (6-4-2-2) |
| January 12 | 7:07 PM | at Bemidji State* | #7 | Sanford Center • Bemidji, Minnesota | | Johnson | W 5-1 | 4,483 | 12-6-5 (6-4-2-2) |
| January 13 | 7:07 PM | vs. Bemidji State* | #7 | Ralph Engelstad Arena • Grand Forks, North Dakota | | Johnson | T 2-2 ^{OT} | 11,868 | 12-6-6 (6-4-2-2) |
| January 19 | 8:07 PM | at #14 Minnesota-Duluth | #7 | Amsoil Arena • Duluth, Minnesota | CBSSN | Johnson | L 3-5 | 6,372 | 12-7-6 (6-5-2-2) |
| January 20 | 7:07 PM | at #14 Minnesota-Duluth | #7 | Amsoil Arena • Duluth, Minnesota | | Johnson | L 2-5 | 6,903 | 12-8-6 (6-6-2-2) |
| January 26 | 7:37 PM | vs. #4 Denver | #11 | Ralph Engelstad Arena • Grand Forks, North Dakota | CBSSN | Johnson | T 3-3 ^{SOL} | 11,845 | 12-8-7 (6-6-3-2) |
| January 27 | 7:07 PM | vs. #4 Denver | #11 | Ralph Engelstad Arena • Grand Forks, North Dakota | FCS | Johnson | T 1-1 ^{SOL} | 12,002 | 12-8-8 (6-6-4-2) |
| February 9 | 7:37 PM | vs. Colorado College | #8 | Ralph Engelstad Arena • Grand Forks, North Dakota | | Thome | L 2-4 | 11,517 | 12-9-8 (6-7-4-2) |
| February 10 | 7:07 PM | vs. Colorado College | #8 | Ralph Engelstad Arena • Grand Forks, North Dakota | FCS | Thome | W 5-1 | 11,860 | 13-9-8 (7-7-4-2) |
| February 16 | 6:37 PM | at #13 Omaha | #9 | Baxter Arena • Omaha, Nebraska | CBSSN | Thome | L 3-6 | 6,512 | 13-10-8 (7-8-4-2) |
| February 17 | 7:07 PM | at #13 Omaha | #9 | Baxter Arena • Omaha, Nebraska | | Johnson | W 3-0 | 7,517 | 14-10-8 (8-8-4-2) |
| February 23 | 6:35 PM | at Miami | #12 | Steve Cady Arena • Oxford, Ohio | | Johnson | L 3-4 ^{OT} | 2,772 | 14-11-8 (8-9-4-2) |
| February 24 | 6:05 PM | at Miami | #12 | Steve Cady Arena • Oxford, Ohio | | Johnson | T 2-2 ^{SOL} | 2,917 | 14-11-9 (8-9-5-2) |
| March 2 | 7:07 PM | vs. #1 St. Cloud State | #13 | Ralph Engelstad Arena • Grand Forks, North Dakota | | Thome | L 3-4 ^{OT} | 11,923 | 14-12-9 (8-10-5-2) |
| March 3 | 7:07 PM | vs. #1 St. Cloud State | #13 | Ralph Engelstad Arena • Grand Forks, North Dakota | CBSSN | Johnson | T 2-2 ^{SOW} | 12,093 | 14-12-10 (8-10-6-3) |
| March 9 | 7:37 PM | vs. #13 Omaha* | #14 | Ralph Engelstad Arena • Grand Forks, North Dakota (NCHC Quarterfinals) | | Johnson | W 4-0 | 10,125 | 15-12-10 (8-10-6-3) |
| March 10 | 7:07 PM | vs. #13 Omaha* | #14 | Ralph Engelstad Arena • Grand Forks, North Dakota (NCHC Quarterfinals) | | Johnson | W 4-3 ^{OT} | 10,351 | 16-12-10 (8-10-6-3) |
| March 16 | 4:07 PM | vs. #1 St. Cloud State* | #12 | Xcel Energy Center • St. Paul, Minnesota (NCHC Semifinals) | CBSSN | Johnson | L 2-3 ^{OT} | 11,983 | 16-13-10 (8-10-6-3) |
| March 17 | 3:37 PM | vs. #8 Minnesota-Duluth* | #12 | Xcel Energy Center • St. Paul, Minnesota (NCHC 3rd Place) | | Johnson | W 4-1 | 11,372 | 17-13-10 (8-10-6-3) |
*Non-conference game. ^{#}Rankings from USCHO.com Poll. All times are in Central Time.

== Rankings ==
| Poll | Week | | | | | | | | | | | | | | | | | | | | | | | |
| Poll | Pre | 1 | 2 | 3 | 4 | 5 | 6 | 7 | 8 | 9 | 10 | 11 | 12 | 13 | 14 | 15 | 16 | 17 | 18 | 19 | 20 | 21 | 22 | 23 (Final) |
|---|---|---|---|---|---|---|---|---|---|---|---|---|---|---|---|---|---|---|---|---|---|---|---|---|
| USCHO.com | 7 | 7 | 8 | 4 | 4 | 4 | 2 | 3 | 3 | 6 | 5 | 6 | 6 | 7 | 7 | 11 | 8 | 9 | 12 | 13 | 14 | 12 | 14 | 17 |
| USA Today | 7 | 8 | 4 | 4 | 4 | 2 | 3 | 3 | 6 | 5 | 6 | 6 | 7 | 7 | 11 | 10 | 8 | 9 | 12 | 13 | 14 | 12 | NR | NR |
