= Davis Payne =

Canadian ice hockey player and coach

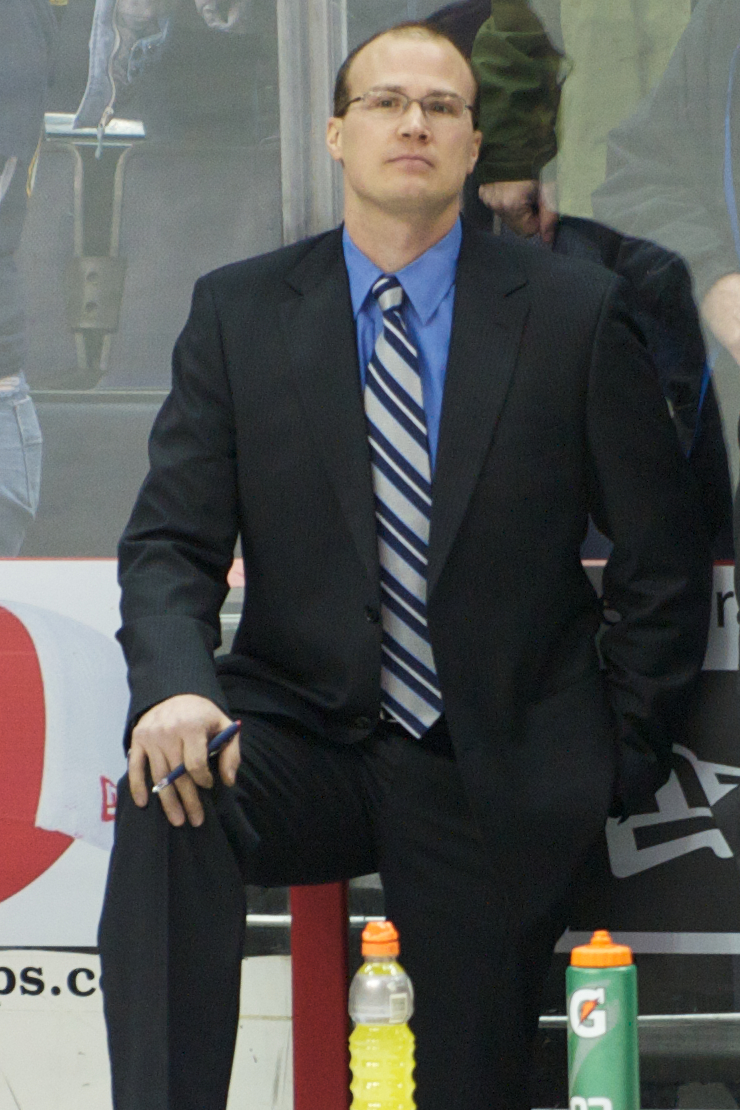
- Payne in 2011
- Born: September 24, 1970 (age 55) Port Alberni, British Columbia, Canada
- Height: 6 ft 3 in (191 cm)
- Weight: 210 lb (95 kg; 15 st 0 lb)
- Position: Right wing
- Shot: Left
- Played for: Boston Bruins
- NHL draft: 140th overall, 1989; Edmonton Oilers
- Playing career: 1992–2000

Davis Payne (born September 24, 1970) is a Canadian former professional ice hockey winger who played in the National Hockey League for the Boston Bruins, and is the former head coach of the St. Louis Blues. He was an assistant coach with the Los Angeles Kings, but was fired on April 11, 2017. He was an associate coach under D. J. Smith with the Ottawa Senators. He currently serves as an assistant coach for the Winnipeg Jets.

== Playing career ==
Payne was drafted 140th overall by the Edmonton Oilers in the 1989 NHL entry draft. He turned pro in 1992 and joined the Greensboro Monarchs of the East Coast Hockey League. He then had spells in the International Hockey League with the Phoenix Roadrunners and the American Hockey League with the Rochester Americans before returning to the Monarchs for a second spell. After playing two games with the Providence Bruins, Payne signed with the Boston Bruins. While spending most of his time playing in Providence, he managed to play 22 games for Boston over two seasons, scoring an assist while collecting 14 penalty minutes. He moved to the San Antonio Dragons before returning to the ECHL to spend his final two seasons with the Greenville Grrrowl. Payne also played for Michigan Technological University in his collegiate career.

== Coaching career ==
=== ECHL: Pee Dee and Alaska ===
In 2000, Payne became the head coach of the Pee Dee Pride in the ECHL. Payne coached there through the 2003 season, attaining a regular season record of 104–67–17. The team also made the playoffs all three seasons, advancing to the second round each year. After the 2002–2003 season, Payne began coaching the Alaska Aces (ECHL). Payne coached in Alaska from 2003 to 2007, leading the team to the playoffs every year, including a Kelly Cup Championship in 2005–2006 season. He ended his tenure at the Aces with a regular season record of 185–75–28 and a playoff record of 38–21. Payne is also one of two coaches to lead his team to back-to-back 100-point seasons, winning the Brabham Cup in 2005–06 with 113 points and finishing second in 2006–07 with 105 points.

=== NHL: St. Louis Blues ===
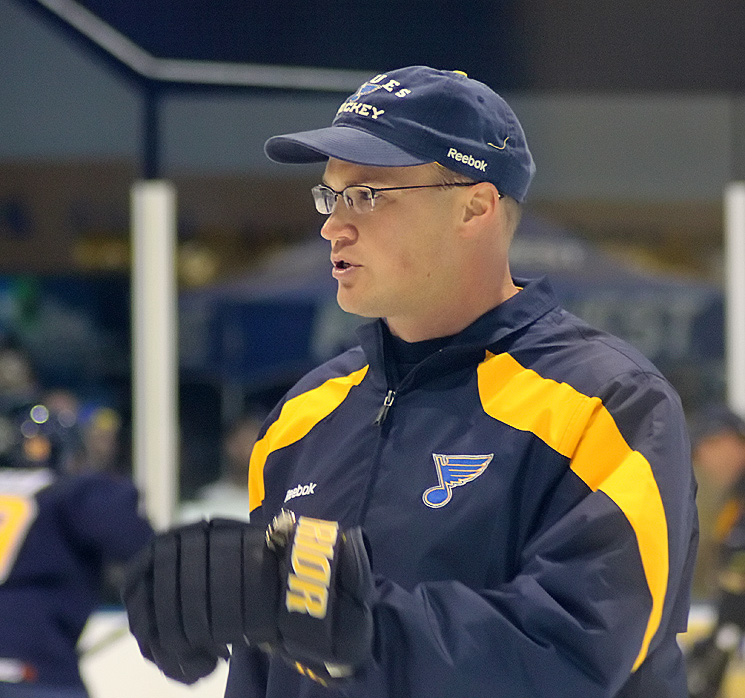
Davis Payne coaching the Blues, 2011.

On January 2, 2010, Payne was named the interim head coach of the St. Louis Blues following the club's dismissal of Andy Murray.

On April 14, 2010, the St. Louis Blues removed the interim tag from Davis' title, and he became the full-time head coach of the team. He was fired on November 6, 2011, after his team got off to a 6–7 start and was replaced by former Dallas Stars head coach Ken Hitchcock.

=== NHL assistant coaching career ===
On July 26, 2012, Los Angeles Kings General Manager Dean Lombardi announced that Davis Payne was hired as assistant coach to Darryl Sutter. Payne won his first Stanley Cup in 2014.

On July 5, 2017, the Buffalo Sabres announced Payne was hired as associate coach to Phil Housley, a position Payne held for two seasons.

In June 2019, it was announced that Payne had become an assistant coach for the Ottawa Senators. When head coach D. J. Smith was dismissed in December 2023, Payne was also dismissed.

On June 17, 2024, the Winnipeg Jets announced that Payne was hired as an assistant coach to Scott Arniel.

== Career statistics ==
=== Regular season and playoffs ===
			Regular season					Playoffs
Season	Team	League	GP	G	A	Pts	PIM	GP	G	A	Pts	PIM
1988–89	Michigan Tech	WCHA	35	5	3	8	38	—	—	—	—	—
1989–90	Michigan Tech	WCHA	30	11	10	21	81	—	—	—	—	—
1990–91	Michigan Tech	WCHA	41	15	20	35	82	—	—	—	—	—
1991–92	Michigan Tech	WCHA	24	6	1	7	71	—	—	—	—	—
1992–93	Greensboro Monarchs	ECHL	57	15	20	35	178	1	0	0	0	4
1993–94	Greensboro Monarchs	ECHL	36	17	17	34	139	8	2	1	3	27
1993–94	Phoenix Roadrunners	IHL	22	6	3	9	51	—	—	—	—	—
1993–94	Rochester Americans	AHL	2	0	0	0	5	3	0	2	2	0
1994–95	Greensboro Monarchs	ECHL	62	25	36	61	195	17	7	10	17	38
1994–95	Providence Bruins	AHL	2	1	0	1	0	—	—	—	—	—
1995–96	Providence Bruins	AHL	51	17	22	39	72	4	1	4	5	2
1995–96	Boston Bruins	NHL	7	0	0	0	7	—	—	—	—	—
1996–97	Providence Bruins	AHL	57	18	15	33	104	—	—	—	—	—
1996–97	Boston Bruins	NHL	15	0	1	1	7	—	—	—	—	—
1997–98	San Antonio Dragons	IHL	59	15	10	25	117	—	—	—	—	—
1997–98	Providence Bruins	AHL	3	0	0	0	0	—	—	—	—	—
1998–99	Greenville Grrrowl	ECHL	43	19	20	39	96	—	—	—	—	—
1999–00	Greenville Grrrowl	ECHL	48	22	25	47	104	5	0	0	0	6
ECHL totals			246	98	118	216	712	31	9	11	20	75
AHL totals			115	36	37	73	181	7	1	6	7	2
NHL totals			22	0	1	1	14	—	—	—	—	—

=== NHL coaching record ===
Team	Year	Regular season						Postseason
Team	Year	G	W	L	OTL	Pts	Finish	Result
St. Louis Blues	2009–10	42	23	15	4	50	4th, Central	Missed Playoffs
St. Louis Blues	2010–11	82	38	33	11	87	4th, Central	Missed Playoffs
St. Louis Blues	2011–12	13	6	7	0	12	1st, Central	Fired
Total		137	67	55	15	149	P%: .544	–

== Personal life ==
Payne is married to Jane, and has two daughters, Allison and Lydia.

Preceded by Andy Murray	Head coach of the St. Louis Blues; 2010–11	Succeeded by Ken Hitchcock
