= Andy Murray (ice hockey) =

Canadian ice hockey coach and former player

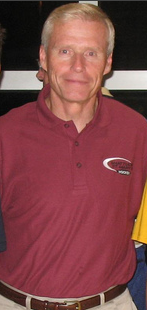

Biographical details
- Born: March 3, 1951 (age 75); Gladstone, Manitoba, Canada

Coaching career (HC unless noted)
- 1976–1978: Brandon Travelers
- 1978–1981: Brandon University
- 1981–1984: Kloten Flyers
- 1984–1987: EV Zug
- 1987–1988: Hershey Bears (asst.)
- 1988–1990: Philadelphia Flyers (asst.)
- 1990–1992: Minnesota North Stars (asst.)
- 1992–1993: HC Lugano
- 1993–1995: Winnipeg Jets (asst.)
- 1996–1998: Canada
- 1998–1999: Shattuck-Saint Mary's
- 1998–1999: Kölner Haie (GM)
- 1999–2006: Los Angeles Kings
- 2006–2010: St. Louis Blues
- 2011–2021: Western Michigan

Head coaching record
- Overall: 167–156–43 (.515) [college]
- Tournaments: 0–2 (.000)

Accomplishments and honors

Championships
- 1997 Men's World Ice Hockey Championships; 2003 Men's World Ice Hockey Championships; 2007 Men's World Ice Hockey Championships; 2012 CCHA tournament champions 2013 Great Lakes Invitational Champions; 2016 Great Lakes Invitational Champions

Awards
- 2012 IIHF Hall of Fame (builder)

Andy Murray (born March 3, 1951) is a Canadian former professional ice hockey coach, who last served as the head coach for the Western Michigan Broncos men's ice hockey team of the NCAA Division I National Collegiate Hockey Conference (NCHC). He is a former head coach of the Los Angeles Kings and the St. Louis Blues in the National Hockey League.

Murray has 20 years of NHL experience as an assistant or head coach. He has also coached at the junior, high school, and college levels, as well as in the North American minor leagues and European professional leagues. He was inducted into the IIHF Hall of Fame in 2012.

== Early life and career ==
Andy Murray's family had an auto dealership in Souris, Manitoba that was started by Murray's grandfather. Once Murray was old enough, he began to work there. In 1976, when Murray was 25 years old, his uncle hired him to be the coach of the Brandon Travellers after a brawl. Three years later, he got the head-coaching job at Brandon University in Manitoba while still working at the dealership during the day. In 1981, his father died the day after a victory that qualified Brandon for a National tournament. After that season, he needed to get away, and took a coaching job in Switzerland. In 1988, he went to the United States to be the assistant coach for the Hershey Bears of the American Hockey League. That year, the Bears won the AHL championship and the Calder Cup, and he was promoted as an assistant coach of the Philadelphia Flyers under head coach Paul Holmgren. He spent two years there before joining as an assistant coach with the Minnesota North Stars under head coach Bob Gainey, where the team made it to the 1991 Stanley Cup Finals. In 1992, he went back to Switzerland to coach for Lugano. Two months later, he quit because of a fan revolt and is replaced by former head coach John Sletvoll. After that, he took a job in Germany before returning to assistant coaching with the Winnipeg Jets under John Paddock, where he stayed until 1995. Murray was named the coach of the Canadian National Hockey Team in 1996, a post he held until 1998. He served as head coach at Shattuck-St. Mary's School for the 1998–99 season.

== NHL coaching career ==
On June 14, 1999, Andy was named to replace Larry Robinson as the new head coach of the Los Angeles Kings, where he stayed for seven seasons. By the end of his tenure, he was the all-time franchise leader in wins (215) and games coached (480).

His best success came in 2001, when the Kings forced the Colorado Avalanche to a seven-game series in the Western Conference Semifinals. The Kings forced the seventh game after previously being down three games to one. He garnered a lot of media attention after publicly stating that anyone on his team that wasn't going to give 100% was not to travel with team back to Colorado for game five of the series. The Kings responded, winning game five, 1–0. They made Murray proud once again in game six, when Glen Murray scored in the second overtime to win the game for the Kings, 1–0.

On March 21, 2006, Murray was fired by the Kings and was replaced on an interim basis by John Torchetti. At the time of Murray's dismissal, the Kings had posted a 37–28–5 record. He provided colour commentary for the Canadian Broadcasting Corporation during their Hockey Night in Canada telecasts of the 2006 Stanley Cup playoffs.

On December 11, 2006, the St. Louis Blues hired Murray to replace Mike Kitchen as head coach after a seven-game losing streak. He coached the Blues to a record of 33–36–13 in his first full season as coach in 2007–2008. On April 10, 2009, Murray coached the Blues from a 15th place showing in the Western Conference at the All-Star Break to a 25–9–7 record down the stretch to clinching the sixth playoff spot, marking the team's first Stanley Cup playoffs appearance since the 2004–05 lockout. Murray's Blues took on the Vancouver Canucks in the opening round of the 2009 Stanley Cup Playoffs and were swept. Murray was named a finalist for the Jack Adams Award for coach of the year during the off-season but lost to Claude Julien of the Boston Bruins.

On January 2, 2010, Murray was fired as Blues coach with a 17–17–4 record. He was replaced with Davis Payne, the head coach of the Blues AHL affiliate Peoria Rivermen.

== International coaching career ==
He coached Canada to three gold medals at the IIHF World Championships in 1997, 2003 and 2007. He was the first coach in IIHF World Championship history to win three championships. In the 2010 World Championships, he acted as a consultant to the Swiss team.

Murray served as associate coach for Team Canada under Marc Crawford at the 1998 Olympics in Nagano, Japan – the first Olympics to feature current NHL players. Murray, who was in his third year as head coach of the Canadian National Team, was hired in part for his experience with the international rink, a larger playing surface. The Canadians concluded the tournament with a loss to Finland in the bronze medal game.

Murray has a record six gold medals as a coach for Canada at the Spengler Cup tournament in Davos, Switzerland, earning the title "Mister Spengler Cup". He headed Team Canada six times – 1984, 1986, 1987, 1992, 1995, 1997 – and won the cup each time.

In 2012, Murray was inducted into the builder category of the IIHF Hall of Fame.

== Collegiate coaching career ==
On July 25, 2011, Murray was announced as the head coach of the Western Michigan Broncos. Murray replaced Jeff Blashill, who left WMU after one season to join the NHL's Detroit Red Wings as an assistant coach.

Murray had no prior experience coaching college hockey in the United States, although he did spend several seasons as head coach in the late 1970s at Brandon University in Manitoba, Canada and had turned down an offer to coach at Rensselaer in 2006. Murray stated at his introductory press conference that coaching college hockey was on his bucket list, and that he loved the college atmosphere and college sports. Murray signed a five-year, $1.5 million contract. Other known finalists for the position included Ron Rolston, a veteran assistant coach of several college and minor league programs, and former WMU player and incumbent WMU assistant coach Pat Ferschweiler. Ferschweiler was retained by Murray and elevated to the position of associate head coach in 2013.

In his first season with WMU (2011–12), the Broncos went 21–14–6, good enough for second-place in the CCHA regular season standings. The team went on to claim the 2012 CCHA men's ice hockey tournament championship with a 3–2 victory over Michigan in the championship game. It was the second CCHA championship for the Broncos, the first coming in 1986. The Broncos then participated in the 2012 NCAA Division I men's ice hockey tournament for the fifth time overall, and second year in a row. The fourth seeded Broncos fell in the first round to WCHA champion and number one seed North Dakota by a score of 3–1.

In Murray's second season (2012–13), WMU finished 19–11–8, good for third place in the season-ending CCHA standings. After earning a first round bye in the CCHA tournament, the Broncos fell in the second round to the lower-seeded Michigan, ending their season. The CCHA disbanded following the season as a result of conference realignment stemming from the start of sponsored hockey in the Big Ten Conference.

In his third season at WMU (2013–14), Murray's Broncos finished 19–16–5, including conference play in their new home with the National Collegiate Hockey Conference, a startup of former CCHA and WCHA programs. In December, WMU won the Great Lakes Invitational, a four team tournament held outdoors at Comerica Park in Detroit, Michigan. The Broncos prevailed over runner-up Michigan Tech in the final for the championship, as well as outpacing third-place Michigan State and fourth-place Michigan. It was the second GLI championship for the Broncos, who also won in 1986. Western finished the season in a tie for 4th place in the inaugural NCHC league standings, considerably higher than pre-season polls had predicted for the newer, stronger conference.

== Personal life ==
Andy and his wife, Ruth, have three children (all hockey players): sons Brady Murray and Jordan Murray, and daughter Sarah Murray. Brady played college hockey at North Dakota and was a fifth round draft pick of the Los Angeles Kings in 2003 while his father was head coach. Jordan Murray played college hockey at Wisconsin and daughter Sarah Murray played college hockey for the Minnesota Duluth Bulldogs women's ice hockey program. All three of the Murray children hold US–Canadian dual citizenship and played professional hockey in Switzerland.

Murray is a former co-owner of the Salmon Arm Silverbacks of the British Columbia Junior Hockey League. He sold his stake in the team in 2007.

Andy Murray is a distant cousin to former NHL veteran center Marty Murray.

In 2017 he was conferred with an honorary Doctor of Laws (honoris causa) from Brandon University.

== Head coaching record ==
=== NHL ===
Team	Year	Regular season							Post season			
Team	Year	G	W	L	T	OTL	Pts	Finish	W	L	Pct.	Result
LAK	1999–2000	82	39	27	12	4	94	2nd in Pacific	0	4	.000	Lost in Conference Quarterfinals (DET)
LAK	2000–01	82	38	28	13	3	92	3rd in Pacific	7	6	.538	Lost in Conference Semifinals (COL)
LAK	2001–02	82	40	27	11	4	95	3rd in Pacific	3	4	.429	Lost in Conference Quarterfinals (COL)
LAK	2002–03	82	33	37	6	6	78	3rd in Pacific	—	—	—	Missed playoffs
LAK	2003–04	82	28	29	16	9	81	3rd in Pacific	—	—	—	Missed playoffs
LAK	2005–06	70	37	28	—	5	79	(fired)	—	—	—	—
STL	2006–07	56	27	18	—	11	65	3rd in Central	—	—	—	Missed playoffs
STL	2007–08	82	33	36	—	13	79	5th in Central	—	—	—	Missed playoffs
STL	2008–09	82	41	31	—	10	92	3rd in Central	0	4	.000	Lost in Conference Quarterfinals (VAN)
STL	2009–10	40	17	17	—	6	40	(fired)	—	—	—	—
Total		740	333	278	58	71	795		10	18	.357	4 playoff appearances

=== College ===
Record table
Season	Team	Overall	Conference	Standing	Postseason
Western Michigan Broncos (CCHA) (2011–2013)
2011–12	Western Michigan	21–14–6	14–10–4–4	T–2nd	NCAA West Regional semifinals
2012–13	Western Michigan	19–11–8	15–7–6–3	3rd	CCHA Quarterfinals
Western Michigan:		40–25–14	29–17–10–7		
Western Michigan Broncos (NCHC) (2013–2021)
2013–14	Western Michigan	19–16–5	11–11–2–2	T–4th	NCHC Third-place game (loss)
2014–15	Western Michigan	14–18–5	6–13–5–4	7th	NCHC Quarterfinals
2015–16	Western Michigan	8–25–3	5–18–1–2	7th	NCHC First round
2016–17	Western Michigan	22–13–5	13–9–2–1	3rd	NCAA East Regional semifinals
2017–18	Western Michigan	15–19–2	10–13–1–0	T–5th	NCHC Quarterfinals
2018–19	Western Michigan	21–15–1	13–10–1–1	3rd	NCHC Quarterfinals
2019–20	Western Michigan	18–13–5	12–9–3–2	4th	Tournament Cancelled
2020–21	Western Michigan	10–12–3	10–11–3	6th	NCHC Quarterfinals
Western Michigan:		127–131–29	80–94–18–12		
Total:		167–156–43			
National champion Postseason invitational champion Conference regular season champion Conference regular season and conference tournament champion Division regular season champion Division regular season and conference tournament champion Conference tournament champion

Awards and achievements
Preceded by Larry Robinson	Head coach of the Los Angeles Kings; 1999–2006	Succeeded by John Torchetti
Preceded by Mike Kitchen	Head coach of the St. Louis Blues; 2006–10	Succeeded by Davis Payne
Preceded by Brad Berry	Herb Brooks Coach of the Year; 2016–17	Succeeded by Bob Motzko
