= Brad Berry =

Canadian ice hockey player (born 1965)

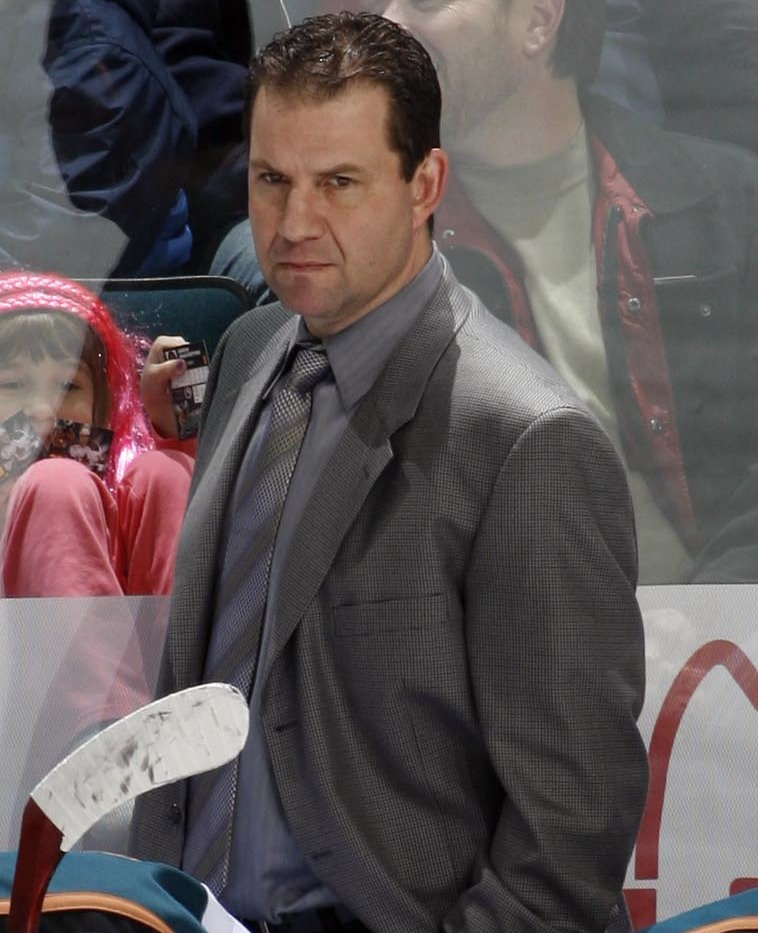
- Berry with the Manitoba Moose in 2007
- Born: April 1, 1965 (age 61) Bashaw, Alberta, Canada
- Height: 6 ft 3 in (191 cm)
- Weight: 205 lb (93 kg; 14 st 9 lb)
- Position: Defenceman
- Shot: Left
- Played for: Winnipeg Jets; Brynäs IF; Minnesota North Stars; Dallas Stars
- National team: Canada
- NHL draft: 29th overall, 1983; Winnipeg Jets
- Playing career: 1986–1999
- Coaching career

Biographical details
- Education: North Dakota

Coaching career (HC unless noted)
- 2000–2006: North Dakota (assistant)
- 2006–2008: Manitoba Moose (assistant)
- 2008–2010: Vancouver Canucks (Scout)
- 2010–2012: Columbus Blue Jackets (assistant)
- 2012–2015: North Dakota (assistant)
- 2015–2025: North Dakota

Head coaching record
- Overall: 227–119–35 (.642)
- Tournaments: 5–4 (.556)

Accomplishments and honors

Championships
- NCAA National Champion (2016); 5 NCHC regular season (2016, 2020–2022, 2024); NCHC tournament (2021)

Awards
- 4x Herb Brooks Coach of the Year (2016, 2020–2022); USCHO Coach of the Year (2016); Spencer Penrose Award (2020)

Records
- т-Most conference regular season championships (5) in UND program history

Bradley L. Berry (born April 1, 1965) is a Canadian ice hockey coach and former player who was most recently the head coach of the University of North Dakota men's ice hockey team. He played 241 games in the National Hockey League for the Winnipeg Jets, Minnesota North Stars, and Dallas Stars.

== Playing career ==
Berry joined the University of North Dakota Fighting Sioux in 1983, playing in a limited role in his first season. For his second year with North Dakota, Berry saw his points total more than triple and was included on Canada's world junior team that won a gold medal. Unfortunately, the Fighting Sioux slipped to fourth place in the standings and were unable to earn a bid into the NCAA tournament. After another year with a similar result Berry, forwent his senior season and turned pro with the Winnipeg Jets who had drafted him in the second round of the 1983 draft.

Berry finished the 1986 season playing 16 games for the Jets (3 in the playoffs) and suited up for a further 52 matches in his first full campaign as a professional. Berry did not produce as expected in 1987-88, leading to a 10-game stint in the minors followed by an additional 38 games the next year. By 1989-90, Berry played only 12 NHL games and chose to sign with Brynäs IF in 1990. After a season in the Swedish Elite League, Berry returned to North America to play for the Kalamazoo Wings. He earned a brief call-up to the parent Minnesota North Stars at the end of the season and played 63 games in 1992-93. Berry played 8 games with the Stars in 1993 as they moved to Dallas before being sent down to the minors. Berry would continue to play for Dallas' farm team until his retirement in 1999.

== Coaching career ==
After his retirement from professional hockey, Berry returned to North Dakota as an assistant coach just after the team had won its seventh national title. Berry stayed with the team for six seasons before taking an AHL assistant coaching position with the Manitoba Moose. After a two-year term with the team, Berry worked as a scout for the Vancouver Canucks for another two seasons before returning behind the bench as an assistant for the Columbus Blue Jackets. In his second year with Columbus, the Jackets had a disastrous season that saw head coach Scott Arniel fired at the midway point. While another assistant, Todd Richards, was given the reins, Berry left and returned once more to Grand Forks for his second stint as an assistant with his alma mater.

After three years as an assistant, Berry was named head coach for the University of North Dakota when his predecessor Dave Hakstol was hired as head coach of the Philadelphia Flyers. In his first season as head coach, Berry became the first head coach in NCAA history to lead their team to a national title in their first season in the role. Berry was fired on March 23, 2025 following his tenth season with the team.

Berry was reported to be the leading candidate to replace Ryan Ward as head coach of the Youngstown Phantoms in July 2026, but walked away from the position after contract negotiations failed. Berry was also linked to Arizona State's interim head coach opening following Greg Powers being placed on administrative leave in September 2026.

== Career statistics ==
=== Regular season and playoffs ===
			Regular season					Playoffs
Season	Team	League	GP	G	A	Pts	PIM	GP	G	A	Pts	PIM
1981–82	Sherwood Park Crusaders	AJHL	58	8	28	36	46	—	—	—	—	—
1982–83	St. Albert Saints	AJHL	55	9	33	42	97	—	—	—	—	—
1983–84	University of North Dakota	WCHA	32	2	7	9	8	—	—	—	—	—
1984–85	University of North Dakota	WCHA	40	4	26	30	26	—	—	—	—	—
1985–86	University of North Dakota	WCHA	40	6	29	35	26	—	—	—	—	—
1985–86	Winnipeg Jets	NHL	13	1	0	1	10	3	0	0	0	0
1986–87	Winnipeg Jets	NHL	52	2	8	10	60	7	0	1	1	14
1987–88	Winnipeg Jets	NHL	48	0	6	6	75	—	—	—	—	—
1987–88	Moncton Hawks	AHL	10	1	3	4	14	—	—	—	—	—
1988–89	Winnipeg Jets	NHL	38	0	9	9	45	—	—	—	—	—
1988–89	Moncton Hawks	AHL	38	3	16	19	39	—	—	—	—	—
1989–90	Winnipeg Jets	NHL	12	1	2	3	6	1	0	0	0	0
1989–90	Moncton Hawks	AHL	38	1	9	10	58	—	—	—	—	—
1990–91	Brynäs IF	SWE	38	3	1	4	38	2	0	0	0	0
1990–91	Canadian National Team	Intl	4	0	1	1	0	—	—	—	—	—
1991–92	Minnesota North Stars	NHL	7	0	0	0	6	2	0	0	0	2
1991–92	Kalamazoo Wings	IHL	65	5	18	23	90	5	2	0	2	6
1992–93	Minnesota North Stars	NHL	63	0	3	3	109	—	—	—	—	—
1993–94	Dallas Stars	NHL	8	0	0	0	12	—	—	—	—	—
1993–94	Kalamazoo Wings	IHL	45	3	19	22	91	1	0	0	0	0
1994–95	Kalamazoo Wings	IHL	65	4	11	15	146	1	0	0	0	6
1995–96	Michigan K-Wings	IHL	80	4	13	17	73	10	0	5	5	12
1996–97	Michigan K-Wings	IHL	77	4	7	11	68	4	0	0	0	4
1997–98	Michigan K-Wings	IHL	67	3	8	11	60	—	—	—	—	—
1998–99	Michigan K-Wings	IHL	5	0	1	1	10	—	—	—	—	—
IHL totals			404	23	77	100	538	21	2	5	7	22
NHL totals			241	4	28	32	323	13	0	1	1	16

=== International ===
Year	Team	Event	GP	G	A	Pts	PIM
1985	Canada	WJC	7	0	1	1	2
Junior totals			7	0	1	1	2

== Head coaching record ==
Record table
Season	Team	Overall	Conference	Standing	Postseason
North Dakota Fighting Hawks (NCHC) (2015–2025)
2015–16	North Dakota	34–6–4	19–4–2	1st	NCAA National Champion
2016–17	North Dakota	21–16–3	11–12–1	4th	NCAA West regional semifinals
2017–18	North Dakota	17–13–10	8–10–6	4th	NCHC Third-place game (win)
2018–19	North Dakota	18–17–2	12–11–1	5th	NCHC first round
2019–20	North Dakota	26–5–4	17–4–3	1st	Tournament Cancelled
2020–21	North Dakota	22–6–1	18–5–1	1st	NCAA Midwest Regional Final
2021–22	North Dakota	24–14–1	17–6–1	T–1st	NCAA East Regional Semifinals
2022–23	North Dakota	18–15–6	10–10–4	T–5th	NCHC Semifinals
2023–24	North Dakota	26–12–2	15–8–1	1st	NCAA Midwest Regional Semifinals
2024–25	North Dakota	21–15–2	14–9–1	5th	NCHC Semifinals
North Dakota:		227–119–35	141–79–21		
Total:		227–119–35			
National champion Postseason invitational champion Conference regular season champion Conference regular season and conference tournament champion Division regular season champion Division regular season and conference tournament champion Conference tournament champion

Sporting positions
Preceded by Dave Hakstol	Head coach of the University of North Dakota; 2015–2025	Succeeded by Dane Jackson
Awards and achievements
Preceded by Dave Hakstol; Brett Larson	NCHC Coach of the Year; 2015–16; 2019–20, 2020–21, 2021–22	Succeeded by Andy Murray; Pat Ferschweiler
Preceded by Greg Carvel	Spencer Penrose Award; 2019–20 (with Mike Schafer)	Succeeded by Mike Hastings
