= Kris Mayotte =

American ice hockey player and coach (born 1983)

Kristofer Mayotte
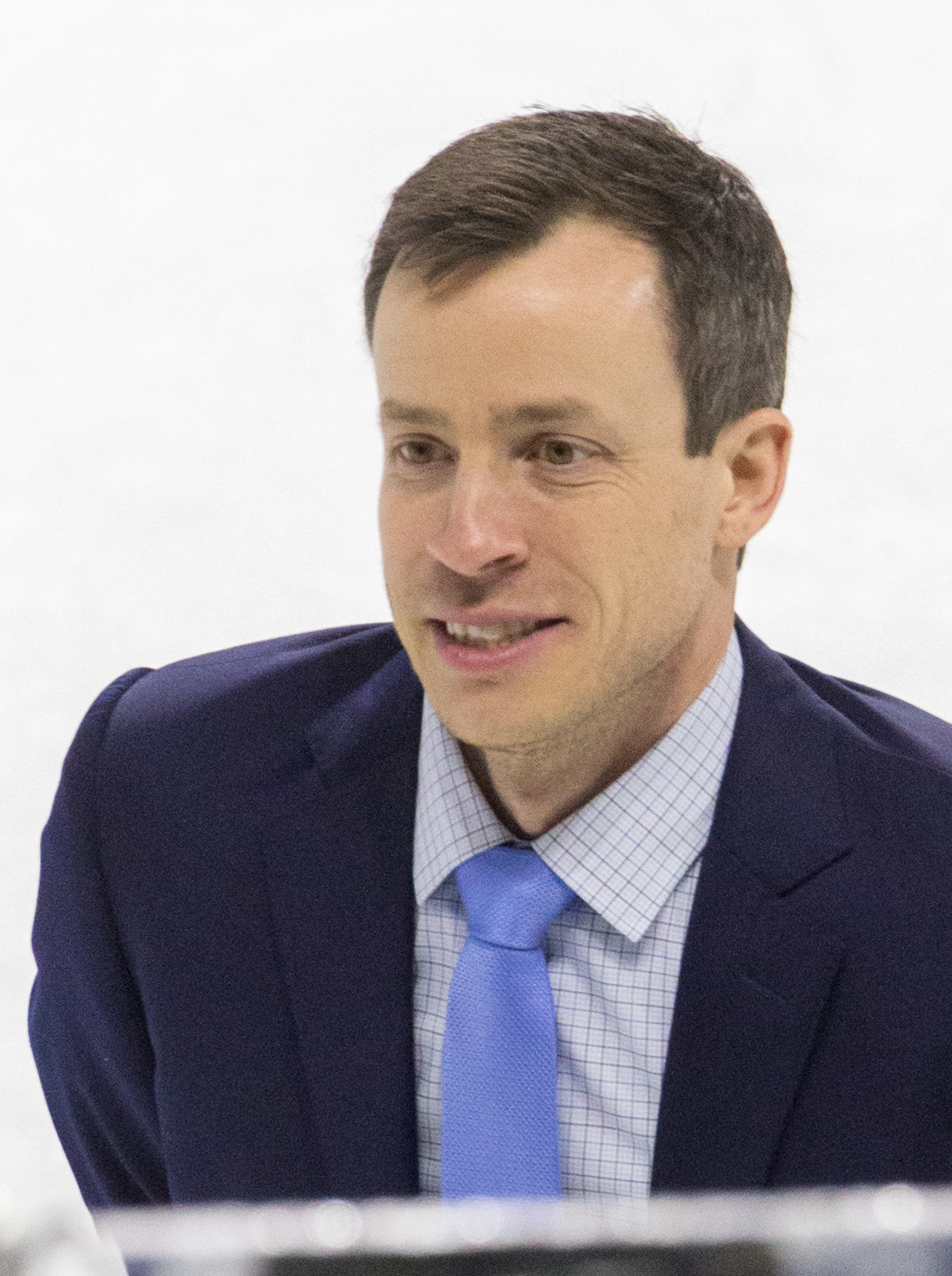

Current position
- Title: Head coach
- Team: Colorado College
- Conference: NCHC

Biographical details
- Born: February 20, 1983 (age 43); Pittsburgh, Pennsylvania, U.S.
- Education: Union College

Playing career
- 2002–2006: Union
- 2005–2006: San Diego Gulls
- 2005–2006: Lowell Lock Monsters
- 2006–2007: Arizona Sundogs
- 2007–2008: Fresno Falcons
- 2008–2010: Johnstown Chiefs
- 2008–2009: Hershey Bears
- 2008–2009: Bridgeport Sound Tigers
- 2009–2010: Adirondack Phantoms
- Position: Goaltender

Coaching career (HC unless noted)
- 2011–2012: Cornell (goalie)
- 2012–2014: St. Lawrence (assistant)
- 2014–2019: Providence (associate)
- 2019–2021: Michigan (assistant)
- 2021–present: Colorado College

Head coaching record
- Overall: 61–77–10 (.446)

Accomplishments and honors

Championships
- 2015 NCAA Champion (assistant)

Awards
- Herb Brooks Coach of the Year (2024)

Kristofer Mayotte (born February 20, 1983) is an American ice hockey coach and former player who is currently the head coach of Colorado College's men's ice hockey team. Previously, he was an assistant coach at Providence College, and helped the team win its first national championship in 2015. He has also coached at Cornell University, St. Lawrence University, and the University of Michigan.

== Career ==
Mayotte began his collegiate career at Union College in 2002. He became the team starting goaltender as a freshman and remained a fixture in net for four years. During Mayotte's tenure, the team didn't see much success, recording just one non-losing season and one playoff win (in 9 attempts). Despite this, Mayotte played well in goal, particularly in his senior season. He was named to the second All-ECAC team and posted a program record for both a season and career in shutouts (both have since been broken).

After the season, Mayotte began his professional career by signing a PTO (Professional Try-Out) contract with the Lowell Lock Monsters. After finishing out the season, Mayotte signed a full contract with the Colorado Avalanche in August and was eventually assigned to their CHL affiliate, the Arizona Sundogs. Mayotte split starting duties with Chris King but neither goalie played particularly well and both were gone after the season. Mayotte ended up with the Fresno Falcons the following season and again shared starting duties. While he was the secondary netminder, Mayotte's numbers did improve and he ended up as the primary goaltender for the Johnstown Chiefs the next season. He played well enough to get two short stints at the AHL level but didn't distinguish himself enough to remain in AAA hockey. After a disappointing year with Johnstown in 2010, Mayotte retired as a player.

He spent the 2010–11 season working as a goaltending coach at Maryland and joined Cornell as a volunteer assistant the following year. In 2012 he got his first full-time position at St. Lawrence. He worked mostly on goaltending an penalty killing for head coach Greg Carvel but left after two seasons to take similar position with Providence. He joined the Friars just in time to help the team go on a surprising run in the 2015 NCAA Tournament and win the championship. Providence's goaltender, Jon Gillies, was an All-American and NCAA Tournament Most Outstanding Player that season.

Mayotte remained at Providence until 2019 when he left to join the coaching staff at Michigan. He helped the Wolverines put themselves in a position to make the NCAA tournament both years but the COVID-19 pandemic prevented Michigan from playing in either 2020 or 2021. After his second year with the Wolverines, Mayotte was named the 15th head coach for Colorado College.

== Statistics ==
=== Regular season and playoffs ===
			Regular season									Playoffs
Season	Team	League	GP	W	L	T	MIN	GA	SO	GAA	SV%	GP	W	L	MIN	GA	SO	GAA	SV%
2000–01	Cleveland Jr. Barons	NAHL	17	—	—	—	—	—	—	—	—	—	—	—	—	—	—	—	—
2001–02	Sioux City Musketeers	USHL	28	16	6	3	1538	66	3	2.57	.910	—	—	—	—	—	—	—	—
2002–03	Union	ECAC Hockey	26	11	11	2	1474	67	2	2.73	.905	—	—	—	—	—	—	—	—
2003–04	Union	ECAC Hockey	32	11	16	5	1899	85	2	2.69	.905	—	—	—	—	—	—	—	—
2004–05	Union	ECAC Hockey	21	8	10	1	1186	66	1	3.34	.891	—	—	—	—	—	—	—	—
2005–06	Union	ECAC Hockey	37	16	15	5	2265	88	5	2.33	.918	—	—	—	—	—	—	—	—
2005–06	Lowell Lock Monsters	AHL	1	0	1	0	59	2	0	2.05	.917	—	—	—	—	—	—	—	—
2005–06	San Diego Gulls	ECHL	4	2	1	1	246	11	0	2.69	.931	—	—	—	—	—	—	—	—
2006–07	Arizona Sundogs	CHL	28	13	11	2	1581	92	0	3.49	.887	2	—	—	—	—	—	—	—
2007–08	Fresno Falcons	ECHL	35	18	9	4	1918	95	1	2.97	.901	1	—	—	—	—	—	—	—
2008–09	Johnstown Chiefs	ECHL	37	20	13	3	2194	105	0	2.87	.908	—	—	—	—	—	—	—	—
2008–09	Hershey Bears	AHL	4	1	1	1	172	11	0	3.84	.843	—	—	—	—	—	—	—	—
2008–09	Bridgeport Sound Tigers	AHL	3	2	1	0	189	10	0	3.17	.880	—	—	—	—	—	—	—	—
2009–10	Johnstown Chiefs	ECHL	33	10	16	5	1912	123	0	3.86	.892	—	—	—	—	—	—	—	—
2009–10	Adirondack Phantoms	AHL	1	0	1	0	30	4	0	7.97	.733	—	—	—	—	—	—	—	—
NCAA totals			116	46	52	13	6824	306	10	2.69	.907	—	—	—	—	—	—	—	—
ECHL totals			109	50	39	13	6270	334	1	3.20	.902	1	—	—	—	—	—	—	—
AHL totals			9	3	4	1	450	27	0	3.60	.859	—	—	—	—	—	—	—	—

== Head coaching record ==
Record table
Season	Team	Overall	Conference	Standing	Postseason
Colorado College Tigers (NCHC) (2021–present)
2021–22	Colorado College	9–24–3	6–17–1	7th	NCHC Quarterfinals
2022–23	Colorado College	13–22–3	6–15–3	7th	NCHC Runner-Up
2023–24	Colorado College	21–13–3	14–8–2	T–3rd	NCHC Quarterfinals
2024–25	Colorado College	18–18–1	11–12–1	6th	NCHC Quarterfinals
Colorado College:		61–77–10	37–51–7		
Total:		61–77–10			
National champion Postseason invitational champion Conference regular season champion Conference regular season and conference tournament champion Division regular season champion Division regular season and conference tournament champion Conference tournament champion

Awards and achievements
Preceded by Pat Ferschweiler	NCHC Coach of the Year; 2023–24	Succeeded by Pat Ferschweiler
