= Pat Ferschweiler =

American ice hockey player and coach

- Born: February 20, 1970 (age 56) Rochester, Minnesota, U.S.
- Height: 6 ft 1 in (185 cm)
- Weight: 205 lb (93 kg; 14 st 9 lb)
- Position: Right wing
- Shot: Right
- Played for: Roanoke Express; Minnesota Moose; Kansas City Blades; San Francisco Spiders; London Knights
- NHL draft: Undrafted
- Playing career: 1993–2001
- Coaching career

Current position
- Title: Head Coach
- Team: Western Michigan
- Conference: NCHC

Biographical details
- Education: Western Michigan University

Playing career
- 1990–93: Western Michigan
- Position: Right wing

Coaching career (HC unless noted)
- 2010–14: Western Michigan (Asst.)
- 2014–15: Grand Rapids Griffins (Asst.)
- 2015–2019: Detroit Red Wings (Asst.)
- 2019–2021: Western Michigan (Asso.)
- 2021–present: Western Michigan

Head coaching record
- Overall: 131–61–5 (.678)
- Tournaments: 6–4 (.600)

Accomplishments and honors

Championships
- 2025 NCAA National Champion

Awards
- Spencer Penrose Award (2025); 2× Herb Brooks Coach of the Year (2023, 2025)

Pat Ferschweiler (born February 20, 1970) is an American ice hockey coach and former player. He is currently the head coach for the Western Michigan Broncos.

== Playing career ==
Ferschweiler began his collegiate career with the Western Michigan Broncos in 1990, having previously played for the Rochester Mustangs of the USHL. He had a strong first season with the Broncos, registering 20 points in 42 games during the 1990–91 season. The following season was a successful one for Ferschweiler, as he was named the Best Defensive Forward in the CCHA, despite scoring at over a point-per-game rate. He returned for his third year with the Broncos and was named team captain; during the 1992–93 season he tallied 35 points in 38 games. and was a runner up for the Best Defensive Forward award. At the culmination of the season, Ferschweiler turned professional.

Ferschweiler's first pro season was spent with the Roanoke Express of the ECHL, where he had a strong season, finishing 2nd in the team in scoring after registering 85 points in 68 games. The Express would make it to the playoffs, but would ultimately lose to the Raleigh IceCaps in the opening round. He would return to Roanoke for the 1994–95 season and would be the leading the team's leading scorer when he was called up to the Kansas City Blades of the IHL, having already played one game in the IHL with Roanoke's parent team, the Minnesota Moose. With the Blades, he registered 29 points in 49 games during the regular season. The team would have an extended run in the playoffs, ultimately losing to the Denver Grizzlies in the final.

The 1995–96 season saw Ferschweiler remain in Kansas City, however, on December 21, 1995, he was traded to the San Francisco Spiders in exchange for Jeff Madill, where he played for the rest of the season. His stay in California was short lived however, as he returned to Kansas City in time for the 1996–97 season. He would struggle to find form during the season, registering only 10 points in 49 games. The following season would be more productive, with Ferschweiler scoring 43 points in 79 games, and the team made it to the final playoff quarter finals, before losing to the Long Beach Ice Dogs. Ferschweiler would have another good season during 1997–98, tallying 45 points in 80 games. The 1999–00 season would see another dip in production, with Ferschweiler tallying 29 games in 82 games, as the team missed the playoffs.

Ferschweiler would move overseas for the 2000–01 season, moving to the U.K. in order to play for reigning British champions the London Knights of the BISL. Joining him in the British capital was former Blades teammate Brendan Yarema, whilst David Vallieres & Grant Richison joined the team later in the season. Ferschweiler was named captain and would register 20 points in 39 games. Whilst performing well in the league, the Knights would also find continental success, beating both the Munich Barons and HC Slovan Bratislava in the IIHF Continental Cup. Although Swiss side ZSC Lions would ultimately win the Cup, the Knights would take the silver medal and their performance in the competition was considered to be the best by a British team at the time. Towards the end of the season, Ferschweiler picked up a wrist injury which would ultimately keep him out of the playoffs; the Knights narrowly lost in the playoff final to the Sheffield Steelers. Subsequently, Ferschweiler retired as a professional hockey player.

== Awards and achievements ==
- CCHA Best Defensive Forward (1992)

== Career statistics ==
			Regular season					Playoffs
Season	Team	League	GP	G	A	Pts	PIM	GP	G	A	Pts	PIM
1989–90	Rochester Mustangs	USHL	44	22	35	57	28	—	—	—	—	—
1990–91	Western Michigan University	NCAA	42	7	13	20	71	—	—	—	—	—
1991–92	Western Michigan University	NCAA	36	8	32	40	56	—	—	—	—	—
1992–93	Western Michigan University	NCAA	38	15	20	35	58	—	—	—	—	—
1993–94	Roanoke Express	ECHL	68	27	58	85	79	2	0	1	1	2
1994–95	Roanoke Express	ECHL	22	8	22	30	44	—	—	—	—	—
1994–95	Minnesota Moose	IHL	1	0	0	0	0	—	—	—	—	—
1994–95	Kansas City Blades	IHL	49	11	18	29	28	20	2	4	6	22
1995–96	Kansas City Blades	IHL	16	0	3	3	8	—	—	—	—	—
1995–96	San Francisco Spiders	IHL	42	3	7	10	42	4	0	0	0	0
1996–97	Kansas City Blades	IHL	49	4	6	10	42	2	0	1	1	2
1997–98	Kansas City Blades	IHL	79	16	27	43	73	10	2	2	4	8
1998–99	Kansas City Blades	IHL	80	7	38	45	66	3	0	1	1	2
1999–00	Kansas City Blades	IHL	82	8	21	29	66	—	—	—	—	—
2000–01	London Knights	BISL	39	3	17	20	26	—	—	—	—	—
IHL totals			398	49	120	169	325	39	4	8	12	34

== Coaching career ==
In 2004, Ferschweiler took on the role of general manager and head coach of the Russell Stover Under-18 team of the Midwest Elite Hockey League. He simultaneously acted as the director of hockey for the Kansas City Stars youth organization from 2005 to 2009.

Ferschweiler returned to his alma mater in 2010, serving as an assistant under new WMU head coach Jeff Blashill. The Broncos enjoyed their best season in years, leading to an appearance in the 2011 NCAA Division I Men's Ice Hockey Tournament. After the 2010–11 season, Blashill departed WMU for an assistant coaching position with the Detroit Red Wings of the National Hockey League. Ferschweiler was one of several candidates who interviewed for the head coaching position at WMU, a job that eventually went to former NHL head coach Andy Murray. Ferschweiler remained on the Broncos staff as assistant to Murray for the next three seasons. Prior to the 2013–14 season, he was promoted to associate head coach.

Ferschweiler joined the Grand Rapids Griffins of the AHL as an assistant coach for the 2014–15 season, replacing Jim Paek. The move reunited him with Griffins head coach Jeff Blashill.

On June 23, 2015, Ferschweiler, Tony Granato, Chris Chelios, and Dave Noel-Bernier were named assistant coaches for the Detroit Red Wings of the NHL. The move once again reunited him with Blashill, who had been named the Red Wings head coach on June 9. Ferschweiler had earlier been mentioned in news reports as a candidate for the Griffins head coaching job, which ultimately went to Todd Nelson.

Whilst at the Red Wings, Ferschweiler also served as an Assistant coach with the USA U-18 team as they competed in the Hlinka Gretzky Cup. In 2019 he was promoted to Head coach, as the team finished 6th overall.

On July 30, 2019, it was announced that Ferschweiler would return to WMU, as an Associate Head Coach.

On August 3, 2021, it was announced that Ferschweiler would take over as Head Coach at WMU in wake of Andy Murray resigning.

=== College ===
Record table
Season	Team	Overall	Conference	Standing	Postseason
Western Michigan Broncos (NCHC) (2021–present)
2021–22	Western Michigan	26–12–1	14–9–1	3rd	NCAA Northeast Regional Final
2022–23	Western Michigan	23–15–1	15–8–1	2nd	NCAA East Regional Semifinal
2023–24	Western Michigan	21–16–1	11–13–1	6th	NCAA Midwest Regional Semifinal
2024–25	Western Michigan	34–7–1	19-4-1	1st	NCAA National Champion
2025–26	Western Michigan	27–11–1	16-7-1	3rd	NCAA Loveland Regional Final
Western Michigan:		131–61–5 (.678)	75–42–5 (.635)		
Total:		131–61–5 (.678)			
National champion Postseason invitational champion Conference regular season champion Conference regular season and conference tournament champion Division regular season champion Division regular season and conference tournament champion Conference tournament champion

== Personal ==
Ferschweiler graduated from Western Michigan University in 1993 with a bachelor's degree in finance. He is married to his wife Stacie, and has two daughters.

Awards and achievements
Preceded by Greg Brown	Spencer Penrose Award; 2024–25	Succeeded by Reid Cashman
Preceded by Brad Berry; Kris Mayotte	NCHC Coach of the Year; 2022–23; 2024–25	Succeeded by Kris Mayotte; Dane Jackson
