= Dave Hakstol =

Canadian ice hockey coach

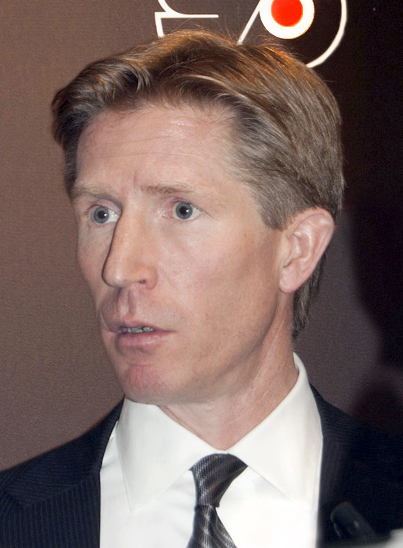
- Hakstol in 2015
- Born: July 30, 1968 (age 58) Drayton Valley, Alberta, Canada
- Height: 6 ft 1 in (185 cm)
- Weight: 201 lb (91 kg; 14 st 5 lb)
- Position: Defence
- Shot: Right
- Played for: Indianapolis Ice; Minnesota Moose
- Coached for: Philadelphia Flyers; Seattle Kraken
- Playing career: 1992–1996
- Coaching career: 1996–present
- Coaching career

Current position
- Title: Head Coach
- Team: Arizona State
- Conference: NCHC

Biographical details
- Education: North Dakota

Coaching career (HC unless noted)
- 1996–2000: Sioux City Musketeers
- 2000–2001: North Dakota (assistant)
- 2001–2004: North Dakota (associate)
- 2004–2015: North Dakota
- 2015–2018: Philadelphia Flyers
- 2019–2021: Toronto Maple Leafs (assistant)
- 2021–2024: Seattle Kraken
- 2025–2026: Colorado Avalanche (assistant)
- 2026–present: Arizona State

Head coaching record
- Overall: 289–143–43 (NCAA Division I)
- Tournaments: 17–11 (NCAA Division I)

Accomplishments and honors

Championships
- 4x WCHA Tournament (2006, 2010–2012); 2x WCHA regular season (2009, 2011); NCHC regular season (2015)

Awards
- 2009 WCHA Coach of the year; 2015 Herb Brooks Coach of the Year

David Hakstol (born July 30, 1968) is a Canadian ice hockey coach who is currently the head coach for the Arizona State Sun Devils men's ice hockey team. Hakstol was the head coach for Sioux City Musketeers for four seasons, followed by four years as an assistant at his alma mater, the University of North Dakota. He was promoted to head coach in 2004 and led the program for eleven seasons. Hakstol was a head coach of the Philadelphia Flyers of the National Hockey League (NHL) in 2015, leading the team until his firing in 2018. Additionally, he served as the first head coach of the NHL's Seattle Kraken from 2021 to 2024, after their expansion. Internationally, Hakstol was an assistant coach for Canada's national men's team in 2017 and 2019.

Hakstol is a native of Warburg, Alberta; he played for the UND Fighting Sioux from 1989 to 1992 and in the International Hockey League (IHL) for five years.

== Career ==
Hakstol attended the University of North Dakota and played hockey there from 1989 to 1992. He played minor league hockey for five years, including stints with the Indianapolis Ice and Minnesota Moose. After retiring as a player, he moved to the coaching ranks with the Sioux City Musketeers. He replaced a fired head coach in the middle of the 1996–97 season and remained in the role for four years. He was succeeded by Dave Siciliano.

Hakstol became an assistant coach with his alma mater North Dakota in 2000 under head coach Dean Blais. When Blais left for the NHL in 2004, Hakstol was promoted to head coach and led UND to the NCAA Frozen Four seven times in eleven seasons. He was honored with conference coach of the year awards in 2009 and 2015, and was an eight-time finalist for national coach of the year.

On May 18, 2015, it was announced that Hakstol would become the Philadelphia Flyers' 19th head coach. Hakstol is the first head coach to go directly from the NCAA to the NHL since 1982 (Bob Johnson from the University of Wisconsin to the Calgary Flames). Hakstol picked up his first NHL victory in the Flyers' third game of the season, a 1–0 win over the Florida Panthers.

On April 11, 2017, it was announced that Hakstol would join Jon Cooper, Gerard Gallant, and Dave King as coaches of Canada's men's national ice hockey team for the 2017 IIHF World Championship tournament.

On December 17, 2018, the Flyers relieved Hakstol as the head coach of the team after a 12–15–4 start to the 2018–19 season. On June 29, 2019, he was hired as assistant head coach of the Toronto Maple Leafs, and stayed for two seasons.

Hakstol was hired as head coach of the expansion Seattle Kraken on June 24, 2021. In their second season, he was a finalist for the Jack Adams Award as NHL coach of the year, after the Kraken qualified for the Stanley Cup playoffs for the first time in franchise history and improved by 19 wins and 40 points in the standings. In July 2023, the Kraken extended Hakstol's contract through the 2025–26 season. After missing the playoffs the subsequent season, Hakstol was fired by Seattle on April 29, 2024.

Hakstol was hired as an assistant coach for the Colorado Avalanche on July 8, 2025.

Hakstol was announced as Arizona State University's head coach on October 15, 2026.

== Head coaching record ==
=== NHL ===
Team	Year	Regular season						Postseason			
Team	Year	Games	Won	Lost	OTL	Points	Finish	Won	Lost	Win%	Result
PHI	2015–16	82	41	27	14	96	5th in Metropolitan	2	4	.333	Lost in first round (WSH)
PHI	2016–17	82	39	33	10	88	6th in Metropolitan	—	—	—	Missed playoffs
PHI	2017–18	82	42	26	14	98	3rd in Metropolitan	2	4	.333	Lost in first round (PIT)
PHI	2018–19	31	12	15	4	(28)	(fired)	—	—	—	—
PHI total		277	134	101	42			4	8	.333	2 playoff appearances
SEA	2021–22	82	27	49	6	60	8th in Pacific	—	—	—	—
SEA	2022–23	82	46	28	8	100	4th in Pacific	7	7	.500	Lost in second round (DAL)
SEA	2023–24	82	34	35	13	81	6th in Pacific	—	—	—	—
SEA total		246	107	112	27			7	7	.500	1 playoff appearance
Total		523	241	213	69			11	15	.423	3 playoff appearances

=== NCAA ===
Record table
Season	Team	Overall	Conference	Standing	Postseason
North Dakota Fighting Sioux (WCHA) (2004–2011)
2004–05	North Dakota	25–15–5	13–12–3	5th	NCAA Runner-up
2005–06	North Dakota	29–16–1	16–12–0	t-4th	NCAA Frozen Four
2006–07	North Dakota	24–14–5	13–10–5	3rd	NCAA Frozen Four
2007–08	North Dakota	28–11–4	18–7–3	2nd	NCAA Frozen Four
2008–09	North Dakota	24–15–4	17–7–4	1st	NCAA 1st Round
2009–10	North Dakota	25–13–5	15–10–3	t-4th	NCAA 1st Round
2010–11	North Dakota	32–9–3	21–6–1	1st	NCAA Frozen Four
North Dakota (WCHA) (2011–2013)
2011–12	North Dakota	26–13–3	16–11–1	4th	NCAA 2nd Round
2012–13	North Dakota	22–13–7	14–7–7	3rd	NCAA 2nd Round
North Dakota (NCHC) (2013–2015)
2013–14	North Dakota	25–14–3	15–9–0	2nd	NCAA Frozen Four
2014–15	North Dakota	29–10–3	16–6–2	1st	NCAA Frozen Four
North Dakota:		289–143–43	174–97–31		
Arizona State Sun Devils (NCHC) (2026–present)
2026–2027	Arizona State				
Arizona State:					
Total:		289–143–43			
National champion Postseason invitational champion Conference regular season champion Conference regular season and conference tournament champion Division regular season champion Division regular season and conference tournament champion Conference tournament champion

=== USHL ===
Team	Year	Regular Season									Postseason
Team	Year	G	W	L	T	OTL	GF	GA	Pts	Finish	Postseason
SC	1996–97	54	9	43	2	2	162	307	20	6th, South	Missed playoffs
SC	1997–98	56	32	21	3	3	195	155	67	4th, South	Lost in Quarterfinals
SC	1998–99	56	34	19	3	1	196	148	71	2nd, West	Lost in Quarterfinals
SC	1999–2000	58	27	26	5	5	170	162	59	6th, West	Lost in Quarterfinals

Sporting positions
Preceded by David Lohrei	Head coach of the Sioux City Musketeers; 1996–2000	Succeeded by Dave Siciliano
Preceded by Dean Blais	Head coach of the University of North Dakota; 2004–2015	Succeeded by Brad Berry
Preceded by Craig Berube	Head coach of the Philadelphia Flyers; 2015–2018	Succeeded by Scott Gordon (interim)
Preceded by Position created	Head coach of the Seattle Kraken; 2021–2024	Succeeded by Dan Bylsma
Preceded by Greg Powers	Head coach of Arizona State University; 2026–present	Succeeded by Incumbent
Awards and achievements
Preceded by Troy Jutting	WCHA Coach of the Year; 2008–09	Succeeded by George Gwozdecky
Preceded by Bob Motzko	NCHC Coach of the Year; 2014–15	Succeeded by Brad Berry
