= Herb Brooks Coach of the Year =

NCHC Herb Brooks Coach of the Year
- Sport: College ice hockey
- League: NCHC
- Awarded for: The Coach of the Year in the NCHC

History
- First award: 2014
- Most wins: Brad Berry (4)
- Most recent: Dane Jackson

The Herb Brooks Coach of the Year is an annual award given out at the conclusion of the National Collegiate Hockey Conference regular season to the best coach in the conference as voted by the coaches of each NCHC team.

The Coach of the Year was first awarded in 2014 and is a successor to the CCHA Coach of the Year which was temporarily discontinued after the first iteration of the conference dissolved due to the 2013–14 NCAA conference realignment.

The award is named in honor of Herb Brooks who, though having died ten years prior to the NCHC beginning play, coached founding member St. Cloud State for one season. He is better known for coaching Minnesota to their first three national championships in the 1970s as well as leading Team USA to victory at the Miracle on Ice en route to the gold medal at the 1980 Winter Olympics.

== Award winners ==
Year	Winner	School
2013–14	Bob Motzko	St. Cloud State
2014–15	Dave Hakstol	North Dakota
2015–16	Brad Berry	North Dakota
2016–17	Andy Murray	Western Michigan
2017–18	Bob Motzko	St. Cloud State
2018–19	Brett Larson	St. Cloud State
2019–20	Brad Berry	North Dakota
2020–21	Brad Berry	North Dakota
2021–22	Brad Berry	North Dakota
2022–23	Pat Ferschweiler	Western Michigan
2023–24	Kris Mayotte	Colorado College
2024–25	Pat Ferschweiler	Western Michigan
2025–26	Dane Jackson	North Dakota

=== Winners by school ===
School	Winners
North Dakota	6
St. Cloud State	3
Western Michigan	3
Colorado College	1

== See also ==
- NCHC Awards
- CCHA Coach of the Year
