= Brett Larson =

American ice hockey player and coach

- Born: August 20, 1972 (age 54) Duluth, Minnesota, U.S.
- Height: 5 ft 10 in (178 cm)
- Weight: 175 lb (79 kg; 12 st 7 lb)
- Position: Defenseman
- Shot: Right
- Played for: Minnesota–Duluth; Madison Monsters; Louisville Riverfrogs; San Diego Gulls; Utah Grizzlies; Long Beach Ice Dogs; Las Vegas Thunder; Rote Teufel Bad Nauheim; Odense Bulldogs; Basingstoke Bison; Florida Seals; Minnesota Arctic Blast; Orlando Jackals; Minnesota Blue Ox
- National team: United States
- NHL draft: 213th overall, 1990; Detroit Red Wings
- Playing career: 1991–2007
- Coaching career

Current position
- Title: Head coach
- Team: Minnesota
- Conference: Big Ten
- Record: 0–0–0

Biographical details
- Education: University of Minnesota Duluth

Playing career
- 1991–1995: Minnesota–Duluth
- Position: Defenseman

Coaching career (HC unless noted)
- 2006–2007: Florida Seals (assistant)
- 2008–2011: Minnesota–Duluth (assistant)
- 2011–2013: Sioux City Musketeers
- 2013–2015: Ohio State (assistant)
- 2015–2018: Minnesota–Duluth (assistant)
- 2018–2026: St. Cloud State
- 2026–present: Minnesota

Head coaching record
- Overall: 137–97–22 (.578)
- Tournaments: 4–4 (.500)

Accomplishments and honors

Awards
- Herb Brooks Coach of the Year (2019)

Brett Larson (born August 20, 1972) is an American ice hockey coach and former player who is currently the head coach of the Minnesota Golden Gophers men's ice hockey team.

== Playing career ==
After being drafted out of high school, Larson waited a year before beginning his college career at Minnesota–Duluth. In his freshman season he scored only three points in 26 games for a middling team. The following year the Bulldogs rocketed up the standings, winning the WCHA and making the NCAA tournament. In his junior season Larson was given a great role with the team and responded by posting more than quintuple his previous season's total. Despite this Duluth dropped to 7th in the WCHA and stayed there for the rest of Larson's college career. After graduating Larson embarked on a long career that was spent mostly in the minor leagues in North America. During the later half of the 1990s he also played roller hockey in the RHI, stopping only due to the league ceasing operations.

In 2001, After winning the Taylor Cup with San Diego Larson signed with Rote Teufel Bad Nauheim of the German second league playing one season for the Red Devils before joining the Odense Bulldogs. In his first season with the Bulldogs he helped the team win the regular season title but fell in the championship match. The team had diminishing returns each of the following two years and after splitting the 2005–06 season between Bad Nauheim and Basingstoke Larson returned to the states for one more season before retiring as a player.

== Coaching career ==
During his playing career Larson had twice served as a player/coach; for two years with the San Diego Gulls and in his brief stint with Florida Seals. After his playing days were over Larson took a year off before returning as a full-time coach, joining the staff at his alma mater as an assistant. After only three years behind the bench he was hired as the head coach/GM for the Sioux City Musketeers, but after two poor seasons he headed back to the college ranks. After a two-year stop at Ohio State he began a third stint with Minnesota–Duluth, staying for another three seasons before he received his first opportunity to lead a college program with St. Cloud State. Larson was announced as head coach of Minnesota on March 24, 2026.

== Career statistics ==
			Regular season					Playoffs
Season	Team	League	GP	G	A	Pts	PIM	GP	G	A	Pts	PIM
1991–92	Minnesota–Duluth Bulldogs	NCAA	26	2	1	3	20	–	–	–	–	–
1992–93	Minnesota–Duluth Bulldogs	NCAA	33	2	3	5	8	–	–	–	–	–
1993–94	Minnesota–Duluth Bulldogs	NCAA	38	14	14	28	40	–	–	–	–	–
1994–95	Minnesota–Duluth Bulldogs	NCAA	37	6	25	31	50	–	–	–	–	–
1995–96	Madison Monsters	CHL	70	12	31	43	37	6	2	1	3	18
1996–97	Louisville Riverfrogs	ECHL	27	4	13	17	4	–	–	–	–	–
1997–98	San Diego Gulls	WCHL	52	8	19	27	26	–	–	–	–	–
1997–98	Utah Grizzlies	IHL	9	0	0	0	6	–	–	–	–	–
1998–99	San Diego Gulls	WCHL	60	10	36	46	42	12	7	7	14	6
1998–99	Long Beach Ice Dogs	IHL	4	0	0	0	2	–	–	–	–	–
1998–99	Utah Grizzlies	IHL	1	0	0	0	0	–	–	–	–	–
1998–99	Las Vegas Thunder	IHL	2	0	0	0	0	–	–	–	–	–
1999–00	San Diego Gulls	WCHL	69	11	44	55	64	9	3	6	9	6
1999–00	Long Beach Ice Dogs	IHL	1	0	0	0	0	–	–	–	–	–
2000–01	San Diego Gulls	WCHL	70	8	33	41	42	13	3	5	8	2
2001–02	Rote Teufel Bad Nauheim	DEL2	43	10	17	27	87	–	–	–	–	–
2002–03	Odense Bulldogs	Denmark	27	2	6	8	83	13	1	1	2	10
2003–04	Odense Bulldogs	Denmark	31	2	3	5	60	13	3	2	5	6
2004–05	Odense Bulldogs	Denmark	33	2	6	8	34	15	3	0	3	12
2005–06	Rote Teufel Bad Nauheim	Germany3	28	2	9	11	50	–	–	–	–	–
2005–06	Basingstoke Bison	EIHL	16	0	12	12	16	6	0	1	1	10
2006–07	Florida Seals	SPHL	6	1	3	4	16	–	–	–	–	–
NCAA totals			134	24	43	67	118	–	–	–	–	–

== Awards and honours ==
West Coast Hockey League
Award	Year
Taylor Cup champion	2001

== Head coaching record ==
=== USHL ===
Team	Year	Regular season						Postseason
Team	Year	G	W	L	T	Pts	Finish	Result
Sioux City Musketeers	2011–12	60	29	30	1	(59)	5th in West	Lost in Conference Quarterfinals 0–2
Sioux City Musketeers	2012–13	64	23	30	11	(57)	6th in West	Missed Postseason

=== College ===
Record table
Season	Team	Overall	Conference	Standing	Postseason
St. Cloud State Huskies (NCHC) (2018–2026)
2018–19	St. Cloud State	30–6–3	19–2–3–2	1st	NCAA Regional Semifinals
2019–20	St. Cloud State	13–15–6	10–12–2–1	5th	Tournament cancelled
2020–21	St. Cloud State	20–11–0	15–9–0	2nd	NCAA Runner-Up
2021–22	St. Cloud State	18–15–4	10–10–4	T–4th	NCAA Regional Semifinals
2022–23	St. Cloud State	25–13–3	12–9–3	4th	NCAA Regional Final
2023–24	St. Cloud State	17–16–5	11–9–4	T–3rd	NCHC Semifinals
2024–25	St. Cloud State	14–21–1	7–16–1	8th	NCHC Quarterfinals
St. Cloud State:		137–97–22	84–67–17		
Total:		137–97–22			
National champion Postseason invitational champion Conference regular season champion Conference regular season and conference tournament champion Division regular season champion Division regular season and conference tournament champion Conference tournament champion

Awards and achievements
Preceded by Bob Motzko	Herb Brooks Coach of the Year; 2018–19	Succeeded by Brad Berry
