= Dane Jackson (ice hockey) =

Canadian ice hockey player & coach (born 1970)

- Born: May 17, 1970 (age 56) Winnipeg, Manitoba, Canada
- Height: 6 ft 1 in (185 cm)
- Weight: 200 lb (91 kg; 14 st 4 lb)
- Position: Right Wing
- Shot: Right
- Played for: Vancouver Canucks; Buffalo Sabres; New York Islanders
- NHL draft: 44th overall, 1988; Vancouver Canucks
- Playing career: 1992–2003
- Coaching career

Current position
- Title: Head coach
- Team: North Dakota
- Conference: NCHC

Biographical details
- Education: University of North Dakota

Coaching career (HC unless noted)
- 2003–2005: Manchester Monarchs (assistant)
- 2005–2006: Adirondack Frostbite
- 2006–2015: North Dakota (assistant)
- 2015–2025: North Dakota (associate)
- 2025: North Dakota (interim)
- 2025–present: North Dakota

Head coaching record
- Overall: 29–10–1 (NCAA)

Accomplishments and honors

Championships
- NCHC regular season (2026)

Awards
- Herb Brooks Coach of the Year (2026)

Dane K. Jackson (born May 17, 1970) is a Canadian coach and former professional ice hockey right wing who is currently head coach of the University of North Dakota men's ice hockey team. He spent parts of four seasons in the National Hockey League between 1993 and 1998. Selected by the Vancouver Canucks in the 1988 NHL entry draft, he spent four years at the University of North Dakota before making his professional debut for the Canucks' American Hockey League (AHL) affiliate in 1992. Jackson made his NHL debut in 1993, and would split the next two seasons between the Canucks and their AHL affiliates, the Hamilton Canucks and Syracuse Crunch. He joined the Buffalo Sabres in 1995, though spent most of the next two years with their AHL affiliate, the Rochester Americans, and in 1997 signed with the New York Islanders. Jackson spent the final six seasons of his playing career in the AHL, moving between the Americans, Lowell Lock Monsters, and Manchester Monarchs, before retiring in 2003. Since then he has worked as a coach, and has been on the coaching staff of North Dakota since 2006.

== Playing career ==
A gritty, hard-working winger, Jackson was drafted in the third round, 44th overall, by the Vancouver Canucks in the 1988 NHL entry draft. He attended the University of North Dakota the following season, and although his college career got off to a slow start, he showed steady improvement and recorded 23 goals by his senior year. Joining him at North Dakota was fellow 1988 Canuck pick Dixon Ward, the first of four different stops where the two players would play together.

Jackson turned pro in 1992, and spent most of the next three seasons with the Canucks' AHL affiliates. He performed well in limited NHL action, scoring six goals in 13 games, but struggled to crack a deep Vancouver squad. He became a free agent in 1995 and signed with the Buffalo Sabres.

In 1995–96, Jackson had his longest NHL audition, registering 5 goals and 9 points in 22 games for the Sabres. He also (along with his old college linemate Dixon Ward) helped the Rochester Americans, Buffalo's AHL affiliate, to the Calder Cup Championship. He signed with the New York Islanders in 1997, and play eight more NHL games in the 1997–98 season, recording a goal and an assist.

Jackson continued on in the AHL until retiring in 2003. He finished his NHL career with 12 goals and 6 assists for 18 points in 45 career games. He added another 199 goals in 11 seasons in the AHL.

== Coaching career ==
Following his playing career, Jackson served as an assistant coach with the Manchester Monarchs, the same team he played his final two seasons with, from 2003–2005. In January 2006, he was named head coach of the Adirondack Frostbite of the United Hockey League following the death of coach Marc Potvin.

Jackson has also been an assistant coach at his alma mater, the University of North Dakota, who advanced to the NCAA Frozen Four during his first season in 2006–07. He was named interim head coach of North Dakota after Brad Berry was fired before being selected as the program's 17th head coach on March 29, 2025.

== Career statistics ==
=== Regular season and playoffs ===
			Regular season					Playoffs
Season	Team	League	GP	G	A	Pts	PIM	GP	G	A	Pts	PIM
1985–86	Castlegar Rebels	KIJHL	39	22	38	60	53	—	—	—	—	—
1986–87	Castlegar Rebels	KIJHL	—	—	—	—	—	—	—	—	—	—
1987–88	Vernon Lakers	BCHL	49	24	30	54	95	13	7	10	17	49
1988–89	University of North Dakota	WCHA	30	4	5	9	33	—	—	—	—	—
1989–90	University of North Dakota	WCHA	44	15	11	26	56	—	—	—	—	—
1990–91	University of North Dakota	WCHA	37	17	9	26	79	—	—	—	—	—
1991–92	University of North Dakota	WCHA	39	23	19	42	81	—	—	—	—	—
1992–93	Hamilton Canucks	AHL	68	23	20	43	59	—	—	—	—	—
1993–94	Vancouver Canucks	NHL	12	5	1	6	9	—	—	—	—	—
1993–94	Hamilton Canucks	AHL	60	25	35	60	75	4	2	2	4	16
1994–95	Vancouver Canucks	NHL	3	1	0	1	4	6	0	0	0	10
1994–95	Syracuse Crunch	AHL	78	30	28	58	162	—	—	—	—	—
1995–96	Buffalo Sabres	NHL	22	5	4	9	41	—	—	—	—	—
1995–96	Rochester Americans	AHL	50	27	19	46	132	19	4	6	10	53
1996–97	Rochester Americans	AHL	78	24	34	58	111	10	7	4	11	14
1997–98	New York Islanders	NHL	8	1	1	2	4	—	—	—	—	—
1997–98	Rochester Americans	AHL	28	10	13	23	55	3	2	2	4	4
1998–99	Lowell Lock Monsters	AHL	80	16	27	43	103	3	0	1	1	16
1999–00	Rochester Americans	AHL	21	6	9	15	8	—	—	—	—	—
2000–01	Rochester Americans	AHL	69	16	12	28	104	4	1	1	2	4
2001–02	Manchester Monarchs	AHL	76	16	21	37	93	5	1	0	1	9
2002–03	Manchester Monarchs	AHL	63	6	14	20	80	3	0	1	1	0
AHL totals			671	199	232	431	982	51	17	17	34	116
NHL totals			45	12	6	18	58	6	0	0	0	10

== Head coaching record ==
Record table
Season	Team	Overall	Conference	Standing	Postseason
North Dakota Fighting Hawks (NCHC) (2025–present)
2025–26	North Dakota	29–10–1	17–6–1	1st	NCAA Frozen Four
North Dakota:		29–10–1	17–6–1		
Total:		29–10–1			
National champion Postseason invitational champion Conference regular season champion Conference regular season and conference tournament champion Division regular season champion Division regular season and conference tournament champion Conference tournament champion

Sporting positions
Preceded by Brad Berry	Head coach of the University of North Dakota; 2025–	Succeeded by Incumbent
Awards and achievements
Preceded by Pat Ferschweiler	NCHC Coach of the Year; 2025–26	Succeeded by Incumbent
