= 2019–20 Colorado College Tigers men's ice hockey season =

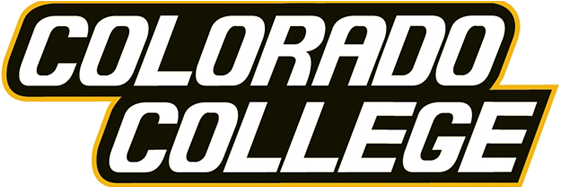
- Conference: 8th NCHC
- Home ice: Broadmoor World Arena

Rankings
- USCHO.com: NR
- USA Today/ US Hockey Magazine: NR

Record
- Overall: 11–20–3
- Conference: 4–17–3–1
- Home: 4–10–3
- Road: 6–10–0
- Neutral: 1–0–0

Coaches and captains
- Head coach: Mike Haviland
- Assistant coaches: R. J. Enga; Leon Hayward; Tate Maris
- Captain(s): Alex Berardinelli; Grant Cruikshank
- Alternate captain(s): Chris Wilkie; Nick Halloran; Zach Berzolla

The 2019–20 Colorado College Tigers men's ice hockey season was the 80th season of play for the program and the 7th in the NCHC conference. The Tigers represented Colorado College and were coached by Mike Haviland, in his 6th season.

On March 12, 2020, NCHC announced that the tournament was cancelled due to the coronavirus pandemic, before any games were played.

== Roster ==
As of August 1, 2019.

| No. | Nat. | Player | Class | Pos | Height | Weight | DoB | Hometown | Previous team | NHL rights |
|---|---|---|---|---|---|---|---|---|---|---|
| 2 | (United States) | Chad Sasaki | Freshman | D | 5' 7" (1.7 m) | 160 lb (73 kg) | 1998-02-06 | Cypress, California | Wenatchee Wild (BCHL) | — |
| 3 | (Canada) | Kristian Blumenschein | Senior | D | 5' 10" (1.78 m) | 176 lb (80 kg) | 1997-02-06 | Kelowna, British Columbia | West Kelowna Warriors (BCHL) | — |
| 4 | (United States) | Bryan Yoon | Sophomore | D | 6' 0" (1.83 m) | 169 lb (77 kg) | 1998-01-27 | Parker, Colorado | Tri-City Storm (USHL) | — |
| 7 | (United States) | Alex Berardinelli (C) | Senior | F | 5' 9" (1.75 m) | 160 lb (73 kg) | 1995-07-01 | Pittsburgh, Pennsylvania | Lone Star Brahmas (BCHL) | — |
| 8 | (United States) | Zach Berzolla (A) | Junior | D | 6' 2" (1.88 m) | 200 lb (91 kg) | 1998-05-28 | Howell, New Jersey | Muskegon Lumberjacks (USHL) | — |
| 9 | (United States) | Jackson Ross | Sophomore | D | 6' 0" (1.83 m) | 184 lb (83 kg) | 1997-03-28 | Denver, Colorado | Surrey Eagles (BCHL) | — |
| 10 | (United States) | Patrick Cozzi | Freshman | F | 5' 9" (1.75 m) | 175 lb (79 kg) | 1998-04-30 | Greenlawn, New York | Prince George Spruce Kings (BCHL) | — |
| 12 | (United States) | Ben Copeland | Sophomore | F | 5' 11" (1.8 m) | 172 lb (78 kg) | 1999-04-27 | Edina, Minnesota | Waterloo Black Hawks (USHL) | — |
| 13 | (United States) | Nick Halloran (A) | Senior | F | 5' 10" (1.78 m) | 168 lb (76 kg) | 1997-05-13 | Draper, Utah | Trail Smoke Eaters (BCHL) | — |
| 16 | (United States) | Erik Middendorf | Sophomore | F | 6' 1" (1.85 m) | 190 lb (86 kg) | 2000-07-11 | Scottsdale, Arizona | USNTDP (USHL) | — |
| 18 | (United States) | Connor Mayer | Freshman | D | 5' 11" (1.8 m) | 175 lb (79 kg) | 1999-06-13 | Champlin, Minnesota | Central Illinois Flying Aces (USHL) | — |
| 19 | (United States) | Troy Conzo | Junior | F | 5' 10" (1.78 m) | 165 lb (75 kg) | 1997-02-21 | Nesconset, New York | Wenatchee Wild (BCHL) | — |
| 20 | (Canada) | Alex Pernitsky | Senior | D | 6' 0" (1.83 m) | 189 lb (86 kg) | 1996-06-25 | Unity, Saskatchewan | Lloydminster Bobcats (AJHL) | — |
| 21 | (United States) | Grant Cruikshank (C) | Sophomore | F | 5' 11" (1.8 m) | 189 lb (86 kg) | 1998-07-19 | Delafield, Wisconsin | Penticton Vees (BCHL) | — |
| 23 | (United States) | Bailey Conger | Sophomore (RS) | F | 6' 1" (1.85 m) | 188 lb (85 kg) | 1997-05-01 | Boise, Idaho | Providence (HEA) | — |
| 24 | (United States) | Jack Gates | Junior | F | 5' 7" (1.7 m) | 149 lb (68 kg) | 1998-02-24 | Oceanside, California | Janesville Jets (NAHL) | — |
| 25 | (United States) | Brian Williams | Junior | F | 5' 10" (1.78 m) | 188 lb (85 kg) | 1995-01-08 | San Diego, California | Wenatchee Wild (BCHL) | — |
| 26 | (United States) | Brady Smith | Freshman | D | 5' 8" (1.73 m) | 175 lb (79 kg) | 2000-08-16 | Bloomington, Illinois | Madison Capitols (USHL) | — |
| 27 | (United States) | Josiah Slavin | Freshman | F | 6' 3" (1.91 m) | 185 lb (84 kg) | 1998-12-31 | Erie, Colorado | Chicago Steel (USHL) | CHI, 193rd overall 2018 |
| 28 | (United States) | Andrew Gaus | Graduate | F | 6' 1" (1.85 m) | 190 lb (86 kg) | 1995-02-23 | Wexford, Pennsylvania | Yale (ECAC) | — |
| 29 | (United States) | Christiano Versich | Junior | F | 5' 8" (1.73 m) | 185 lb (84 kg) | 1997-01-02 | Kelly Lake, Minnesota | Bloomington Thunder (USHL) | — |
| 30 | (United States) | Matt Vernon | Freshman | G | 5' 11" (1.8 m) | 170 lb (77 kg) | 1998-03-29 | San Jose, California | Aberdeen Wings (NAHL) | — |
| 33 | (United States) | Jon Flakne | Junior | G | 6' 2" (1.88 m) | 188 lb (85 kg) | 1996-09-04 | Maple Plain, Minnesota | Odessa Jackalopes (NAHL) | — |
| 34 | (United States) | Chris Wilkie (A) | Senior (RS) | F | 6' 1" (1.85 m) | 199 lb (90 kg) | 1996-07-10 | Omaha, Nebraska | North Dakota (NCHC) | FLA, 162nd overall 2015 |
| 36 | (United States) | McKay Flanagan | Junior | D | 6' 1" (1.85 m) | 197 lb (89 kg) | 1997-02-03 | Ridgefield, Connecticut | Langley Rivermen (BCHL) | — |
| 37 | (United States) | Casey Staum | Freshman | D | 6' 0" (1.83 m) | 180 lb (82 kg) | 1998-01-08 | St. Paul, Minnesota | Chicago Steel (USHL) | MTL, 124th overall 2016 |
| 39 | (United States) | Sam Renlund | Freshman | F | 5' 11" (1.8 m) | 190 lb (86 kg) | 2000-04-04 | Verona, Wisconsin | Des Moines Buccaneers (USHL) | — |
| 41 | (United States) | Ryan Ruck | Graduate | G | 6' 1" (1.85 m) | 180 lb (82 kg) | 1994-09-12 | Coto de Caza, California | Northeastern (HEA) | — |

== Standings ==
2019–20 National Collegiate Hockey Conference Standings
| | Conference record | | | | | | | | Overall record | | | | | |
| | GP | W | L | T | 3/SW | PTS | GF | GA | GP | W | L | T | GF | GA |
|---|---|---|---|---|---|---|---|---|---|---|---|---|---|---|
| #3 North Dakota † | 24 | 17 | 4 | 3 | 2 | 56 | 86 | 49 | 35 | 26 | 5 | 4 | 135 | 68 |
| #5 Minnesota–Duluth | 24 | 17 | 5 | 2 | 0 | 53 | 89 | 53 | 34 | 22 | 10 | 2 | 114 | 77 |
| #6 Denver | 24 | 11 | 8 | 5 | 4 | 42 | 67 | 54 | 36 | 21 | 9 | 6 | 118 | 81 |
| #16 Western Michigan | 24 | 12 | 9 | 3 | 2 | 41 | 84 | 73 | 36 | 18 | 13 | 5 | 125 | 101 |
| St. Cloud State | 24 | 10 | 12 | 2 | 1 | 33 | 61 | 74 | 34 | 13 | 15 | 6 | 94 | 108 |
| Omaha | 24 | 8 | 13 | 3 | 0 | 27 | 63 | 75 | 36 | 14 | 17 | 5 | 108 | 107 |
| Miami | 24 | 5 | 16 | 3 | 2 | 20 | 61 | 89 | 34 | 8 | 21 | 5 | 92 | 127 |
| Colorado College | 24 | 4 | 17 | 3 | 1 | 16 | 48 | 96 | 34 | 11 | 20 | 3 | 86 | 123 |
Championship: Cancelled † indicates conference regular season champion; * indicates conference tournament champion Rankings: USCHO.com Top 20 Poll

== Schedule and results ==
| Date | Time | Opponent^{#} | Rank^{#} | Site | TV | Decision | Result | Attendance | Record |
Exhibition
| October 5 | 6:00 PM | vs. Trinity Western* | | Broadmoor World Arena • Colorado Springs, Colorado | | Ruck | W 4–1 | 2,769 | |
Regular season
| October 11 | 7:07 PM | vs. Minnesota* | | Broadmoor World Arena • Colorado Springs, Colorado | FSN+ | Ruck | W 3–2 | 3,429 | 1–0–0 |
| October 12 | 7:05 PM | vs. Minnesota* | | Broadmoor World Arena • Colorado Springs, Colorado | | Ruck | L 3–4 | 3,460 | 1–1–0 |
| October 25 | 7:37 PM | vs. Michigan State* | | Broadmoor World Arena • Colorado Springs, Colorado | ATTRM | Vernon | W 3–1 | 3,430 | 2–1–0 |
| October 26 | 4:00 PM | vs. Michigan State* | | Broadmoor World Arena • Colorado Springs, Colorado | | Vernon | L 1–5 | 3,390 | 2–2–0 |
| November 1 | 7:37 PM | vs. Western Michigan | | Broadmoor World Arena • Colorado Springs, Colorado | | Ruck | L 3–6 | 3,279 | 2–3–0 (0–1–0–0) |
| November 2 | 6:07 PM | vs. Western Michigan | | Broadmoor World Arena • Colorado Springs, Colorado | | Vernon | T 4–4 ^{SOL} | 3,452 | 2–3–1 (0–1–1–0) |
| November 15 | 6:37 PM | at St. Cloud State | | Herb Brooks National Hockey Center • St. Cloud, Minnesota | | Vernon | W 4–2 | 3,601 | 3–3–1 (1–1–1–0) |
| November 16 | 6:07 PM | at St. Cloud State | | Herb Brooks National Hockey Center • St. Cloud, Minnesota | | Vernon | W 5–2 | 3,923 | 4–3–1 (2–1–1–0) |
| November 22 | 6:07 PM | at #9 Minnesota–Duluth | | AMSOIL Arena • Duluth, Minnesota | | Vernon | L 3–4 | 5,574 | 4–4–1 (2–2–1–0) |
| November 23 | 6:07 PM | at #9 Minnesota–Duluth | | AMSOIL Arena • Duluth, Minnesota | | Vernon | L 0–5 | 5,581 | 4–5–1 (2–3–1–0) |
| December 6 | 2:02 PM | at Princeton* | | Hobey Baker Memorial Rink • Princeton, New Jersey | | Vernon | W 7–2 | 1,001 | 5–5–1 (2–3–1–0) |
| December 7 | 5:02 PM | at Princeton* | | Hobey Baker Memorial Rink • Princeton, New Jersey | | Ruck | W 2–1 ^{OT} | 1,685 | 6–5–1 (2–3–1–0) |
| December 13 | 7:07 PM | at #8 Denver | | Magness Arena • Denver, Colorado | Altitude2 | Vernon | L 0–3 | 5,758 | 6–6–1 (2–4–1–0) |
| December 14 | 7:10 PM | vs. #8 Denver | | Broadmoor World Arena • Colorado Springs, Colorado | ATTRM | Vernon | L 1–3 | 4,400 | 6–7–1 (2–5–1–0) |
Ledyard Bank Classic
| December 28 | 5:37 PM | at Dartmouth* | | Thompson Arena • Hanover, New Hampshire (Ledyard Bank Classic) | NESN | Vernon | L 2–5 | 3,003 | 6–8–1 (2–5–1–0) |
| December 29 | 2:02 PM | vs. St. Lawrence* | | Thompson Arena • Hanover, New Hampshire (Ledyard Bank Classic) | | Ruck | W 7–3 | 2,312 | 7–8–1 (2–5–1–0) |
| January 10 | 7:37 PM | vs. Miami | | Broadmoor World Arena • Colorado Springs, Colorado | | Ruck | L 1–6 | 2,945 | 7–9–1 (2–6–1–0) |
| January 11 | 6:07 PM | vs. Miami | | Broadmoor World Arena • Colorado Springs, Colorado | | Vernon | W 4–2 | 3,391 | 8–9–1 (3–6–1–0) |
| January 17 | 5:00 PM | at Western | | Lawson Arena • Kalamazoo, Michigan | | Vernon | L 2–5 | 2,855 | 8–10–1 (3–7–1–0) |
| January 18 | 5:00 PM | at Western | | Lawson Arena • Kalamazoo, Michigan | | Vernon | L 2–6 | 3,108 | 8–11–1 (3–8–1–0) |
| January 24 | 7:37 PM | vs. Omaha | | Broadmoor World Arena • Colorado Springs, Colorado | | Vernon | L 4–6 | 3,006 | 8–12–1 (3–9–1–0) |
| January 25 | 4:07 PM | vs. Omaha | | Broadmoor World Arena • Colorado Springs, Colorado | | Vernon | L 1–4 | 3,583 | 8–13–1 (3–10–1–0) |
| January 31 | 6:37 PM | at #1 North Dakota | | Ralph Engelstad Arena • Grand Forks, North Dakota | ATTRM | Vernon | L 0–1 | 10,882 | 8–14–1 (3–11–1–0) |
| February 1 | 6:07 PM | at #1 North Dakota | | Ralph Engelstad Arena • Grand Forks, North Dakota | | Vernon | L 1–8 | 10,882 | 8–15–1 (3–12–1–0) |
| February 7 | 7:37 PM | vs. St. Cloud State | | Broadmoor World Arena • Colorado Springs, Colorado | CBSSN | Vernon | L 2–3 | 2,733 | 8–16–1 (3–13–1–0) |
| February 8 | 6:07 PM | vs. St. Cloud State | | Broadmoor World Arena • Colorado Springs, Colorado | | Vernon | T 2–2 ^{SOW} | 3,345 | 8–16–2 (3–13–2-1) |
| February 14 | 7:35 PM | vs. Air Force* | | Broadmoor World Arena • Colorado Springs, Colorado | | Vernon | W 6–2 | 4,355 | 9–16–2 (3–13–2–1) |
| February 17 | 5:05 PM | at Air Force* | | Falcon Stadium • Colorado Springs, Colorado | | Vernon | W 4–2 | 7,178 | 10–16–2 (3–13–2–1) |
| February 21 | 6:07 PM | at Omaha | | Baxter Arena • Omaha, Nebraska | | Vernon | L 0–5 | 5,630 | 10–17–2 (3–14–2–1) |
| February 22 | 6:07 PM | at Omaha | | Baxter Arena • Omaha, Nebraska | | Vernon | W 3–2 | 6,064 | 11–17–2 (4–14–2–1) |
| February 28 | 7:37 PM | vs. #5 Minnesota–Duluth | | Broadmoor World Arena • Colorado Springs, Colorado | | Vernon | L 2–4 | 2,883 | 11–18–2 (4–15–2–1) |
| February 29 | 6:07 PM | vs. #5 Minnesota–Duluth | | Broadmoor World Arena • Colorado Springs, Colorado | ATTRM | Vernon | L 1–6 | 3,043 | 11–19–2 (4–16–2–1) |
| March 6 | 7:37 PM | vs. #6 Denver | | Broadmoor World Arena • Colorado Springs, Colorado | | Vernon | T 2–2 ^{SOL} | 4,466 | 11–19–3 (4–16–3–1) |
| March 7 | 7:07 PM | at #6 Denver | | Magness Arena • Denver, Colorado | CBSSN | Vernon | L 1–5 | 6,527 | 11–20–3 (4–17–3–1) |
NCHC Tournament
Tournament Cancelled
*Non-conference game. ^{#}Rankings from USCHO.com Poll. All times are in Mountain Time.

== Scoring Statistics ==
| Name | Position | Games | Goals | Assists | Points | PIM |
|---|---|---|---|---|---|---|
| Chris Wilkie | RW | 34 | 23 | 8 | 31 | 36 |
| Nick Halloran | RW | 33 | 12 | 18 | 30 | 12 |
| Ben Copeland | C | 34 | 4 | 14 | 18 | 14 |
| Grant Cruikshank | C | 34 | 11 | 6 | 17 | 25 |
| Alex Berardinelli | F | 34 | 4 | 13 | 17 | 12 |
| Bryan Yoon | D | 33 | 1 | 16 | 17 | 8 |
| Josiah Slavin | LW | 34 | 5 | 8 | 13 | 43 |
| Connor Mayer | D | 34 | 4 | 8 | 12 | 20 |
| Bailey Conger | RW | 27 | 4 | 7 | 11 | 14 |
| Troy Conzo | F | 23 | 3 | 6 | 9 | 6 |
| Christiano Versich | RW | 29 | 3 | 4 | 7 | 10 |
| Jack Gates | C | 31 | 3 | 4 | 7 | 6 |
| Zach Berzolla | D | 34 | 2 | 5 | 7 | 62 |
| Andrew Gaus | RW | 29 | 3 | 2 | 5 | 18 |
| Kristian Blumenschein | D | 21 | 1 | 4 | 5 | 10 |
| Sam Renlund | F | 26 | 1 | 4 | 5 | 32 |
| Patrick Cozzi | RW | 34 | 0 | 4 | 4 | 6 |
| Chad Sasaki | D | 31 | 1 | 2 | 3 | 6 |
| Erik Middendorf | LW | 6 | 0 | 2 | 2 | 4 |
| McKay Flanagan | D | 16 | 0 | 2 | 2 | 2 |
| Brady Smith | D | 24 | 1 | 0 | 1 | 4 |
| Ryan Ruck | G | 10 | 0 | 1 | 1 | 0 |
| Casey Staum | D | 11 | 0 | 1 | 1 | 4 |
| Jackson Ross | D | 16 | 0 | 1 | 1 | 2 |
| Jon Flakne | G | 1 | 0 | 0 | 0 | 0 |
| Alex Pernitsky | D | 4 | 0 | 0 | 0 | 0 |
| Brian Williams | C | 4 | 0 | 0 | 0 | 0 |
| Matt Vernon | G | 29 | 0 | 0 | 0 | 0 |
| Bench | - | - | - | - | - | 10 |
| Total | | | 86 | 140 | 226 | 366 |

== Goaltending statistics ==
| Name | Games | Minutes | Wins | Losses | Ties | Goals against | Saves | Shut outs | SV % | GAA |
|---|---|---|---|---|---|---|---|---|---|---|
| Matt Vernon | 29 | 1539 | 8 | 16 | 3 | 88 | 800 | 0 | .901 | 3.43 |
| Ryan Ruck | 10 | 500 | 3 | 4 | 0 | 29 | 267 | 0 | .902 | 3.48 |
| Jon Flakne | 1 | 5 | 0 | 0 | 0 | 2 | 4 | 0 | .500 | 21.30 |
| Empty Net | - | 10 | - | - | - | 4 | - | - | - | - |
| Total | 34 | 2055 | 11 | 20 | 3 | 123 | 1071 | 0 | .897 | 3.59 |

== Rankings ==
| Poll | Week | | | | | | | | | | | | | | | | | | | | | | | |
| Poll | Pre | 1 | 2 | 3 | 4 | 5 | 6 | 7 | 8 | 9 | 10 | 11 | 12 | 13 | 14 | 15 | 16 | 17 | 18 | 19 | 20 | 21 | 22 | 23 (Final) |
|---|---|---|---|---|---|---|---|---|---|---|---|---|---|---|---|---|---|---|---|---|---|---|---|---|
| USCHO.com | NR | NR | NR | NR | NR | NR | NR | NR | NR | NR | NR | NR | NR | NR | NR | NR | NR | NR | NR | NR | NR | NR | NR | NR |
| USA Today | NR | NR | NR | NR | NR | NR | NR | NR | NR | NR | NR | NR | NR | NR | NR | NR | NR | NR | NR | NR | NR | NR | NR | NR |
