= 2019–20 Western Michigan Broncos men's ice hockey season =

Sports season

- Conference: 4th NCHC
- Home ice: Lawson Arena

Rankings
- USCHO: 16
- USA Today: NR

Record
- Overall: 18–13–5
- Conference: 12–9–3–2
- Home: 12–6–0
- Road: 5–7–4
- Neutral: 1–0–1

Coaches and captains
- Head coach: Andy Murray
- Assistant coaches: Dave Shyiak; Pat Ferschweiler
- Captain: Hugh McGing
- Alternate captain(s): Luke Bafia; Wade Allison; Lukas Samuelsson; Josh Passolt

The 2019–20 Western Michigan Broncos men's ice hockey season was the 46th season of play for the program. They represented Western Michigan University in the 2019–20 NCAA Division I men's ice hockey season and for the 7th season in the National Collegiate Hockey Conference (NCHC). The Broncos were coached by Andy Murray, in his 9th season, and played their home games at Lawson Arena.

On March 12, 2020, NCHC announced that the tournament was cancelled due to the coronavirus pandemic, before any games were played.

== Roster ==
As of August 18, 2019.

No.	Nat.	Player	Class	Pos	Height	Weight	DoB	Hometown	Previous team	NHL rights
1	(Canada)	Austin Cain	Junior	G	6' 4" (1.93 m)	187 lb (85 kg)	1996-09-12	Ottawa, Ontario	Whitby Fury (OJHL)	—
2	(United States)	Kale Bennett	Senior	D	6' 0" (1.83 m)	200 lb (91 kg)	1995-11-30	St. Louis, Missouri	Nanaimo Clippers (BCHL)	—
3	(United States)	Michael Joyaux	Sophomore	D	5' 10" (1.78 m)	181 lb (82 kg)	1997-02-13	Bloomingdale, Illinois	Youngstown Phantoms (USHL)	—
4	(United States)	Luke Bafia (A)	Senior	D	6' 2" (1.88 m)	202 lb (92 kg)	1996-01-19	Parrish, Florida	Green Bay Gamblers (USHL)	—
6	(United States)	Scooter Brickey	Freshman	D	6' 3" (1.91 m)	207 lb (94 kg)	1999-05-27	Burtchville, Michigan	Des Moines Buccaneers (USHL)	—
7	(United States)	Ronnie Attard	Freshman	D	6' 4" (1.93 m)	210 lb (95 kg)	1999-03-20	White Lake, Michigan	Tri-City Storm (USHL)	PHI, 72nd overall 2019
9	(United States)	Dawson DiPietro	Senior	F	5' 11" (1.8 m)	185 lb (84 kg)	1995-11-15	Medina, Ohio	Janesville Jets (NAHL)	—
10	(United States)	Lawton Courtnall	Senior	F	6' 0" (1.83 m)	185 lb (84 kg)	1996-03-07	Westlake Village, California	Sioux Falls Stampede (USHL)	—
11	(Canada)	Rhett Kingston	Sophomore	F	6' 1" (1.85 m)	195 lb (88 kg)	1997-11-04	Black Diamond, Alberta	Salmon Arm Silverbacks (BCHL)	—
12	(United States)	Cole Gallant	Sophomore	F	5' 10" (1.78 m)	190 lb (86 kg)	1998-03-14	Dover, Florida	Omaha Lancers (USHL)	—
13	(Canada)	Drew Worrad	Sophomore	F	6' 2" (1.88 m)	186 lb (84 kg)	1997-06-30	Birr, Ontario	Steinbach Pistons (MJHL)	—
14	(United States)	Jason Polin	Freshman	F	6' 0" (1.83 m)	198 lb (90 kg)	1999-06-17	Holt, Michigan	Cedar Rapids RoughRiders (USHL)	—
16	(United States)	Hugh McGing (C)	Senior	F	5' 9" (1.75 m)	175 lb (79 kg)	1998-07-11	Chicago, Illinois	Cedar Rapids RoughRiders (USHL)	STL, 138th overall 2018
17	(Canada)	Wade Allison (A)	Senior	F	6' 2" (1.88 m)	205 lb (93 kg)	1997-10-14	Myrtle, Manitoba	Tri-City Storm (USHL)	PHI, 52nd overall 2016
18	(Canada)	Brett Van Os	Junior	F	6' 2" (1.88 m)	210 lb (95 kg)	1996-02-21	St. Albert, Alberta	Calgary Canucks (AJHL)	—
19	(United States)	Lukas Samuelsson	Junior	F	6' 0" (1.83 m)	177 lb (80 kg)	1996-10-08	Voorhees, New Jersey	Toronto Predators (GMHL)	—
20	(Canada)	Jamie Rome	Sophomore	F	6' 2" (1.88 m)	211 lb (96 kg)	1998-10-03	Cochrane, Alberta	Victoria Grizzlies (BCHL)	—
21	(United States)	Josh Passolt (A)	Junior	F	6' 0" (1.83 m)	180 lb (82 kg)	1996-09-13	Hayward, Wisconsin	Sioux Falls Stampede (USHL)	—
22	(United States)	Austin Rueschhoff	Junior	F	6' 7" (2.01 m)	230 lb (104 kg)	1997-09-07	Wentzville, Missouri	Dubuque Fighting Saints (USHL)	—
23	(United States)	Paul Washe	Junior	F	6' 1" (1.85 m)	201 lb (91 kg)	1998-11-27	Clarkston, Michigan	Fargo Force (USHL)	—
24	(United States)	Mattias Samuelsson (A)	Sophomore	D	6' 4" (1.93 m)	221 lb (100 kg)	2000-03-14	Voorhees, New Jersey	USNTDP (USHL)	BUF, 32nd overall 2018
25	(United States)	Jared Kucharek	Sophomore	D	6' 4" (1.93 m)	203 lb (92 kg)	1998-05-23	Royal Oak, Michigan	Madison Capitols (USHL)	—
26	(United States)	Ethen Frank	Junior	F	5' 10" (1.78 m)	175 lb (79 kg)	1998-02-05	Papillion, Nebraska	Lincoln Stars (USHL)	—
27	(United States)	Cam Orchard	Junior	F	6' 1" (1.85 m)	194 lb (88 kg)	1998-06-27	Middleville, Michigan	Des Moines Buccaneers (USHL)	—
28	(Canada)	Cam Lee	Senior	D	6' 0" (1.83 m)	186 lb (84 kg)	1997-02-18	Ferguson's Cove, Nova Scotia	Green Bay Gamblers (USHL)	—
30	(United States)	Brandon Bussi	Freshman	G	6' 5" (1.96 m)	210 lb (95 kg)	1998-06-25	Sound Beach, New York	Muskegon Lumberjacks (USHL)	—
31	(United States)	Will Massey	Senior (RS)	G	6' 1" (1.85 m)	190 lb (86 kg)	1994-06-25	Penfield, New York	Islanders Hockey Club (USPHL)	—
33	(Canada)	Ben Blacker	Senior	G	5' 10" (1.78 m)	170 lb (77 kg)	1997-04-23	Oakville, Ontario	Cedar Rapids RoughRiders (USHL)	—

== Standings ==
2019–20 National Collegiate Hockey Conference Standings
	Conference record								Overall record					
	GP	W	L	T	3/SW	PTS	GF	GA	GP	W	L	T	GF	GA
#3 North Dakota †	24	17	4	3	2	56	86	49	35	26	5	4	135	68
#5 Minnesota–Duluth	24	17	5	2	0	53	89	53	34	22	10	2	114	77
#6 Denver	24	11	8	5	4	42	67	54	36	21	9	6	118	81
#16 Western Michigan	24	12	9	3	2	41	84	73	36	18	13	5	125	101
St. Cloud State	24	10	12	2	1	33	61	74	34	13	15	6	94	108
Omaha	24	8	13	3	0	27	63	75	36	14	17	5	108	107
Miami	24	5	16	3	2	20	61	89	34	8	21	5	92	127
Colorado College	24	4	17	3	1	16	48	96	34	11	20	3	86	123
Championship: Cancelled † indicates conference regular season champion; * indicates conference tournament champion Rankings: USCHO.com Top 20 Poll

== Schedule and results ==
Date	Time	Opponent^{#}	Rank^{#}	Site	TV	Decision	Result	Attendance	Record
Exhibition
October 5	7:05 PM	vs. Northern Alberta IT*	#14	Lawson Arena • Kalamazoo, Michigan (Exhibition)		Bussi	L 6–1	2,782	
IceBreaker Invitational
October 11	5:00 PM	vs. #12 Ohio State*	#14	Huntington Center • Toledo, Ohio (IceBreaker Semifinal)		Bussi	T 2–2 ^{SOL}	-	0–0–1
October 12	8:00 PM	vs. #17 Bowling Green*	#14	Huntington Center • Toledo, Ohio (IceBreaker Third Place)		Bussi	W 5–2	-	1–0–1
Regular season
October 18	7:07 PM	at Bowling Green*	#14	Slater Family Ice Arena • Bowling Green, Ohio		Bussi	L 1–2	2,328	1–1–1
October 19	7:05 PM	vs. Bowling Green*	#14	Lawson Arena • Kalamazoo, Michigan		Bussi	L 1–2 ^{OT}	2,385	1–2–1
October 25	7:05 PM	at Michigan*	#18	Yost Ice Arena • Ann Arbor, Michigan		Bussi	L 0–4	5,800	1–3–1
October 26	7:05 PM	vs. Michigan*	#18	Lawson Arena • Kalamazoo, Michigan		Bussi	W 4–1	3,985	2–3–1
November 1	9:37 PM	at Colorado College		Broadmoor World Arena • Colorado Springs, Colorado		Bussi	W 6–3	3,279	3–3–1 (1–0–0–0)
November 2	8:07 PM	at Colorado College		Broadmoor World Arena • Colorado Springs, Colorado		Bussi	T 4–4 ^{SOW}	3,452	3–3–2 (1–0–1–1)
November 8	7:05 PM	vs. Ferris State*		Lawson Arena • Kalamazoo, Michigan		Bussi	W 4–2	3,794	4–3–2 (1–0–1–1)
November 9	8:07 PM	at Ferris State*		Ewigleben Arena • Big Rapids, Michigan		Bussi	W 8–2	1,855	5–3–2 (1–0–1–1)
November 15	7:05 PM	vs. #19 Omaha	#20	Lawson Arena • Kalamazoo, Michigan		Bussi	W 3–2	2,800	6–3–2 (2–0–1–1)
November 16	7:05 PM	vs. #19 Omaha	#20	Lawson Arena • Kalamazoo, Michigan		Bussi	L 3–6	3,227	6–4–2 (2–1–1–1)
November 22	9:07 PM	at #4 Denver	#20	Magness Arena • Denver, Colorado		Bussi	W 2–1	4,527	7–4–2 (3–1–1–1)
November 23	9:07 PM	at #4 Denver	#20	Magness Arena • Denver, Colorado		Bussi	L 1–6	4,942	7–5–2 (3–2–1–1)
December 6	7:05 PM	at #3 North Dakota	#17	Lawson Arena • Kalamazoo, Michigan		Bussi	L 0–1 ^{OT}	3,324	7–6–2 (3–3–1–1)
December 7	7:05 PM	at #3 North Dakota	#17	Lawson Arena • Kalamazoo, Michigan		Bussi	L 2–8	3,349	7–7–2 (3–4–1–1)
January 3	7:10 PM	at #15 Notre Dame*	#19	Compton Family Ice Arena • Notre Dame, Indiana	NBCSN	Bussi	T 1–1 ^{OT}	5,247	7–7–3 (3–4–1–1)
January 5	5:05 PM	vs. #15 Notre Dame*	#19	Lawson Arena • Kalamazoo, Michigan		Bussi	L 1–4	3,762	7–8–3 (3–4–1–1)
January 10	8:07 PM	at #9 Minnesota–Duluth		AMSOIL Arena • Duluth, Minnesota	FSN	Bussi	L 3–6	5,864	7–9–3 (3–5–1–1)
January 11	8:07 PM	at #9 Minnesota–Duluth		AMSOIL Arena • Duluth, Minnesota		Blacker	T 3–3 ^{SOW}	6,012	7–9–4 (3–5–2–2)
January 17	7:00 PM	vs. Colorado College		Lawson Arena • Kalamazoo, Michigan		Bussi	W 5–2	2,855	8–9–4 (4–5–2–2)
January 18	7:00 PM	vs. Colorado College		Lawson Arena • Kalamazoo, Michigan		Bussi	W 6–2	3,108	9–9–4 (5–5–2–2)
January 24	7:00 PM	vs. St. Cloud State		Lawson Arena • Kalamazoo, Michigan		Bussi	W 6–2	2,807	10–9–4 (6–5–2–2)
January 25	7:05 PM	vs. St. Cloud State		Lawson Arena • Kalamazoo, Michigan		Bussi	W 6–2	3,386	11–9–4 (7–5–2–2)
January 31	8:37 PM	at Omaha		Baxter Arena • Omaha, Nebraska	CBSSN	Bussi	W 5–2	6,269	12–9–4 (8–5–2–2)
February 1	8:07 PM	at Omaha		Baxter Arena • Omaha, Nebraska		Bussi	L 2–4	6,120	12–10–4 (8–6–2–2)
February 7	7:00 PM	vs. Rensselaer*		Lawson Arena • Kalamazoo, Michigan		Bussi	W 8–4	2,575	13–10–4 (8–6–2–2)
February 8	7:05 PM	vs. Rensselaer*		Lawson Arena • Kalamazoo, Michigan		Bussi	W 6–2	2,975	14–10–4 (8–6–2–2)
February 14	7:05 PM	at Miami		Steve Cady Arena • Oxford, Ohio		Bussi	T 2–2 ^{3x3 OTL}	2,445	14–10–5 (8–6–3–2)
February 15	7:05 PM	at Miami		Steve Cady Arena • Oxford, Ohio		Bussi	W 4–1	2,851	15–10–5 (9–6–3–2)
February 21	7:06 PM	vs. #4 Minnesota–Duluth	#19	Lawson Arena • Kalamazoo, Michigan	CBSSN	Bussi	W 5–3	3,200	16–10–5 (10–6–3–2)
February 22	7:05 PM	vs. #4 Minnesota–Duluth	#19	Lawson Arena • Kalamazoo, Michigan		Bussi	L 1–2	3,667	16–11–5 (10–7–3–2)
February 28	8:37 PM	at #3 North Dakota	#16	Ralph Engelstad Arena • Grand Forks, North Dakota		Bussi	L 1–3	11,214	16–12–5 (10–8–3–2)
February 29	8:07 PM	at #3 North Dakota	#16	Ralph Engelstad Arena • Grand Forks, North Dakota		Blacker	L 1–2 ^{OT}	11,837	16–13–5 (10–9–3–2)
March 6	7:00 PM	vs. Miami	#17	Lawson Arena • Kalamazoo, Michigan		Bussi	W 5–2	2,675	17–13–5 (11–9–3–2)
March 7	7:05 PM	vs. Miami	#17	Lawson Arena • Kalamazoo, Michigan		Bussi	W 8–4	3,069	18–13–5 (12–9–3–2)
NCHC Tournament
Tournament Cancelled
*Non-conference game. ^{#}Rankings from USCHO.com Poll. All times are in Eastern Time.

== Scoring statistics ==
Name	Position	Games	Goals	Assists	Points	PIM
Hugh McGing	C	35	13	22	35	52
Dawson DiPietro	LW	35	12	17	29	46
Austin Rueschhoff	RW	36	12	14	26	24
Wade Allison	RW	26	10	13	23	17
Paul Washe	C	34	12	9	21	26
Cam Lee	D	26	3	18	21	25
Ethen Frank	C	32	9	11	20	6
Cole Gallant	RW	31	4	16	20	9
Rhett Kingston	LW	33	9	8	17	31
Drew Worrad	C	31	6	11	17	2
Michael Joyaux	D	36	2	15	17	27
Josh Passolt	LW	32	5	11	16	23
Ronnie Attard	D	30	6	8	14	29
Mattias Samuelsson	D	30	2	12	14	41
Luke Bafia	D	36	1	10	11	22
Lawton Courtnall	LW	36	5	5	10	18
Jason Polin	F	31	7	2	9	8
Brett Van Os	LW	22	3	5	8	6
Kale Bennett	D	33	3	5	8	8
Jared Kucharek	D	32	1	4	5	10
Scooter Brickey	D	24	0	3	3	8
Brandon Bussi	G	34	0	3	3	8
Lukas Samuelsson	F	9	0	1	1	2
Will Massey	G	1	0	0	0	0
Cam Orchard	C	5	0	0	0	0
Ben Blacker	G	8	0	0	0	0
Jamie Rome	F	9	0	0	0	4
Bench	-	-	-	-	-	20
Total			125	223	348	468

== Goaltending statistics ==
Name	Games	Minutes	Wins	Losses	Ties	Goals against	Saves	Shut outs	SV %	GAA
Will Massey	1	5	0	0	0	0	1	0	1.000	0.00
Brandon Bussi	34	1921	18	12	4	85	859	0	.910	2.65
Ben Blacker	8	252	0	1	1	13	104	0	.889	3.09
Empty Net	-	12	-	-	-	3	-	-	-	-
Total	36	2191	18	13	5	101	964	0	.905	2.77

== Rankings ==
Poll	Week																							
Poll	Pre	1	2	3	4	5	6	7	8	9	10	11	12	13	14	15	16	17	18	19	20	21	22	23 (Final)
USCHO.com	14	14	14	18	NR	NR	20	20	17	17	19	19	19	NR	NR	NR	NR	NR	NR	19	16	17	16	16
USA Today	15	12	15	NR	NR	NR	NR	NR	NR	NR	NR	NR	NR	NR	NR	NR	NR	NR	NR	NR	NR	15	NR	NR
