= 2019–20 North Dakota Fighting Hawks men's ice hockey season =

NCHC, Champion
- Conference: 1st NCHC
- Home ice: Ralph Engelstad Arena

Rankings
- USCHO.com: 2
- USA Today/ US Hockey Magazine: 2

Record
- Overall: 26–5–4
- Conference: 17–4–3–2
- Home: 18–1–0
- Road: 8–4–4
- Neutral: 0–0–0

Coaches and captains
- Head coach: Brad Berry
- Assistant coaches: Dane Jackson; Karl Goehring; Jason Ulmer
- Captain: Colton Poolman
- Alternate captain(s): Cole Smith; Matt Kiersted; Jordan Kawaguchi

The 2019–20 North Dakota Fighting Hawks men's ice hockey season was the 80th season of play for the program and the 7th in the NCHC conference. The Fighting Hawks represented the University of North Dakota and were coached by Brad Berry, in his 5th season. The team won the Penrose Cup, the NCHC regular season championship, for the 3rd time. No postseason was played due to the outbreak of COVID-19.

== Roster ==
As of September 8, 2019.

No.	Nat.	Player	Class	Pos	Height	Weight	DoB	Hometown	Previous team	NHL rights
1		Peter Thome	Junior	G	6' 4" (1.93 m)	208 lb (94 kg)	1997-05-24	Minneapolis, Minnesota	Waterloo Black Hawks (USHL)	CBJ, 155th overall 2016
2		Gabe Bast	Junior	D	5' 9" (1.75 m)	189 lb (86 kg)	1996-12-20	Red Deer, Alberta	Penticton Vees (BCHL)	—
3		Matt Kiersted (A)	Junior	D	6' 0" (1.83 m)	181 lb (82 kg)	1998-04-14	Elk River, Minnesota	Chicago Steel (USHL)	—
4		Andrew Peski	Senior	D	6' 0" (1.83 m)	220 lb (100 kg)	1997-03-11	Ottawa, Ontario	Tri-City Storm (USHL)	—
5		Casey Johnson	Senior	D	6' 2" (1.88 m)	200 lb (91 kg)	1996-04-12	Grand Forks, North Dakota	Dubuque Fighting Saints (USHL)	—
6		Colton Poolman (C)	Senior	D	6' 1" (1.85 m)	198 lb (90 kg)	1995-12-18	East Grand Forks, Minnesota	Penticton Vees (BCHL)	—
7		Zach Yon	Senior	F	6' 0" (1.83 m)	194 lb (88 kg)	1995-12-30	Roseau, Minnesota	Waterloo Black Hawks (USHL)	—
8		Harrison Blaisdell	Freshman	F	5' 11" (1.8 m)	190 lb (86 kg)	2001-03-18	Regina, Saskatchewan	Chilliwack Chiefs (BCHL)	WPG, 134th overall 2019
9		Dixon Bowen	Senior	F	5' 11" (1.8 m)	185 lb (84 kg)	1996-05-05	East Grand Forks, Minnesota	Penticton Vees (BCHL)	—
10		Gavin Hain	Sophomore	F	6' 0" (1.83 m)	197 lb (89 kg)	2000-04-03	Grand Rapids, Minnesota	USNTDP (USHL)	PHI, 174th overall 2018
11		Westin Michaud	Graduate	F	5' 9" (1.75 m)	177 lb (80 kg)	1995-09-26	Cloquet, Minnesota	Colorado College Tigers (NCHC)	—
13		Carson Albrecht	Freshman	F	5' 10" (1.78 m)	192 lb (87 kg)	1998-05-23	Martensville, Saskatchewan	Melfort Mustangs (SJHL)	—
14		Jasper Weatherby	Sophomore	F	6' 4" (1.93 m)	212 lb (96 kg)	1998-01-22	Ashland, Oregon	Wenatchee Wild (BCHL)	SJS, 102nd overall 2018
15		Ethan Frisch	Freshman	D	5' 11" (1.8 m)	190 lb (86 kg)	2000-10-29	Moorhead, Minnesota	Fargo Force (USHL)	—
16		Grant Mismash	Junior	F	6' 1" (1.85 m)	185 lb (84 kg)	1999-02-19	Edina, Minnesota	USNTDP (USHL)	NSH, 61st overall 2017
17		Jonny Tychonick	Sophomore	D	6' 0" (1.83 m)	185 lb (84 kg)	2000-03-03	Calgary, Alberta	Penticton Vees (BCHL)	OTT, 48th overall 2018
18		Collin Adams	Junior	F	5' 9" (1.75 m)	195 lb (88 kg)	1998-04-24	Brighton, Michigan	Muskegon Lumberjacks (USHL)	NYI, 170th overall 2016
19		Mark Senden	Sophomore	F	5' 10" (1.78 m)	196 lb (89 kg)	1998-01-22	Medina, Minnesota	Fargo Force (USHL)	—
20		Josh Rieger	Junior	D	6' 0" (1.83 m)	185 lb (84 kg)	1996-04-02	Regina, Saskatchewan	Estevan Bruins (SJHL)	—
21		Jackson Keane	Sophomore	F	5' 9" (1.75 m)	170 lb (77 kg)	1997-04-08	Winnipeg, Manitoba	Penticton Vees (BCHL)	—
22		Shane Pinto	Freshman	F	6' 3" (1.91 m)	195 lb (88 kg)	2000-11-12	Franklin Square, New York	Tri-City Storm (USHL)	OTT, 32nd overall 2019
24		Jacob Bernard-Docker	Sophomore	D	6' 1" (1.85 m)	195 lb (88 kg)	2000-06-30	Canmore, Alberta	Okotoks Oilers (AJHL)	OTT, 26th overall 2018
26		Cole Smith (A)	Senior	F	6' 3" (1.91 m)	197 lb (89 kg)	1995-12-18	Brainerd, Minnesota	Steinbach Pistons (MJHL)	—
28		Judd Caulfield	Freshman	F	6' 4" (1.93 m)	205 lb (93 kg)	2001-03-19	Grand Forks, North Dakota	USNTDP (USHL)	PIT, 145th overall 2019
29		Jordan Kawaguchi (A)	Junior	F	5' 9" (1.75 m)	185 lb (84 kg)	1997-05-04	Abbotsford, British Columbia	Chilliwack Chiefs (BCHL)	—
31		Adam Scheel	Sophomore	G	6' 3" (1.91 m)	192 lb (87 kg)	1999-05-01	Lakewood, Ohio	Penticton Vees (BCHL)	—
33		Harrison Feeney	Freshman (RS)	G	6' 2" (1.88 m)	210 lb (95 kg)	1998-02-04	Lafayette Hill, Pennsylvania	Lone Star Brahmas (NAHL)	—

== Standings ==
2019–20 National Collegiate Hockey Conference Standings
	Conference record								Overall record					
	GP	W	L	T	3/SW	PTS	GF	GA	GP	W	L	T	GF	GA
#3 North Dakota †	24	17	4	3	2	56	86	49	35	26	5	4	135	68
#5 Minnesota–Duluth	24	17	5	2	0	53	89	53	34	22	10	2	114	77
#6 Denver	24	11	8	5	4	42	67	54	36	21	9	6	118	81
#16 Western Michigan	24	12	9	3	2	41	84	73	36	18	13	5	125	101
St. Cloud State	24	10	12	2	1	33	61	74	34	13	15	6	94	108
Omaha	24	8	13	3	0	27	63	75	36	14	17	5	108	107
Miami	24	5	16	3	2	20	61	89	34	8	21	5	92	127
Colorado College	24	4	17	3	1	16	48	96	34	11	20	3	86	123
Championship: Cancelled † indicates conference regular season champion; * indicates conference tournament champion Rankings: USCHO.com Top 20 Poll

== Schedule and results ==
Date	Time	Opponent^{#}	Rank^{#}	Site	TV	Decision	Result	Attendance	Record
Exhibition
October 5	7:07 PM	vs. Manitoba*	#18	Ralph Engelstad Arena • Grand Forks, North Dakota (Exhibition)		Scheel	W 5–1	11,760	—
Regular season
October 11	7:37 PM	vs. Canisius*	#18	Ralph Engelstad Arena • Grand Forks, North Dakota		Scheel	W 5–0	11,068	1–0–0
October 12	7:07 PM	vs. Canisius*	#18	Ralph Engelstad Arena • Grand Forks, North Dakota		Scheel	W 8–1	11,579	2–0–0
October 18	7:07 PM	at #2 Minnesota State*	#16	Mankato Civic Center • Mankato, Minnesota		Scheel	T 4–4 ^{OT}	4,565	2–0–1
October 19	6:07 PM	at #2 Minnesota State*	#16	Mankato Civic Center • Mankato, Minnesota		Scheel	L 1–2	5,038	2–1–1
October 25	7:37 PM	vs. Bemidji State*	#16	Ralph Engelstad Arena • Grand Forks, North Dakota		Scheel	W 2–1 ^{OT}	11,305	3–1–1
October 26	7:07 PM	vs. Bemidji State*	#16	Ralph Engelstad Arena • Grand Forks, North Dakota		Scheel	W 4–1	11,517	4–1–1
November 2	7:07 PM	vs. Michigan Tech*	#14	Ralph Engelstad Arena • Grand Forks, North Dakota (US Hockey Hall of Fame Game)		Scheel	W 3–1	10,899	5–1–1
November 8	7:37 PM	vs. Miami	#10	Ralph Engelstad Arena • Grand Forks, North Dakota		Scheel	W 7–1	10,425	6–1–1 (1–0–0–0)
November 9	7:07 PM	vs. Miami	#10	Ralph Engelstad Arena • Grand Forks, North Dakota		Scheel	W 5–4	10,775	7–1–1 (2–0–0–0)
November 15	8:07 PM	at #2 Denver	#9	Magness Arena • Denver, Colorado		Scheel	T 1–1 ^{3x3 OTW}	6,056	7–1–2 (2–0–1–1)
November 16	8:07 PM	at #2 Denver	#9	Magness Arena • Denver, Colorado		Scheel	W 4–1	6,308	8–1–2 (3–0–1–1)
November 22	7:37 PM	vs. St. Cloud State	#5	Ralph Engelstad Arena • Grand Forks, North Dakota		Scheel	W 4–2	11,223	9–1–2 (4–0–1–1)
November 23	7:07 PM	vs. St. Cloud State	#5	Ralph Engelstad Arena • Grand Forks, North Dakota		Scheel	W 2–1 ^{OT}	11,747	10–1–2 (5–0–1–1)
November 28	7:05 PM	at Minnesota*	#3	3M Arena at Mariucci • Minneapolis, Minnesota	FSN	Scheel	W 9–3	8,567	11–1–2 (5–0–1–1)
November 29	7:05 PM	at Minnesota*	#3	3M Arena at Mariucci • Minneapolis, Minnesota	FSN	Scheel	W 3–2	9,823	12–1–2 (5–0–1–1)
December 6	6:05 PM	at Western Michigan	#3	Lawson Arena • Kalamazoo, Michigan		Scheel	W 1–0 ^{OT}	3,324	13–1–2 (6–0–1–1)
December 7	6:05 PM	at Western Michigan	#3	Lawson Arena • Kalamazoo, Michigan		Scheel	W 8–2	3,349	14–1–2 (7–0–1–1)
December 28	6:00 PM	at USNTDP*	#1	USA Hockey Arena • Plymouth, Michigan (Exhibition)			W 3–1		—
January 3	7:37 PM	vs. Alabama–Huntsville*	#1	Ralph Engelstad Arena • Grand Forks, North Dakota		Scheel	W 5–2	11,214	15–1–2 (7–0–1–1)
January 4	7:07 PM	vs. Alabama–Huntsville*	#1	Ralph Engelstad Arena • Grand Forks, North Dakota		Scheel	W 5–2	11,760	16–1–2 (7–0–1–1)
January 10	7:37 PM	vs. Omaha	#1	Ralph Engelstad Arena • Grand Forks, North Dakota		Scheel	L 3–6	10,907	16–2–2 (7–1–1–1)
January 11	7:07 PM	vs. Omaha	#1	Ralph Engelstad Arena • Grand Forks, North Dakota		Scheel	W 4–1	11,725	17–2–2 (8–1–1–1)
January 17	5:30 PM	at Miami	#1	Steve Cady Arena • Oxford, Ohio	CBSSN	Thome	T 4–4 ^{SOW}	1,872	17–2–3 (8–1–2–2)
January 18	6:05 PM	at Miami	#1	Steve Cady Arena • Oxford, Ohio		Thome	W 5–3	2,241	18–2–3 (9–1–2–2)
January 24	7:07 PM	at #11 Minnesota–Duluth	#2	AMSOIL Arena • Duluth, Minnesota	CBSSN	Scheel	L 4–7	7,016	18–3–3 (9–2–2–2)
January 25	7:07 PM	at #11 Minnesota–Duluth	#2	AMSOIL Arena • Duluth, Minnesota		Thome	W 3–2	7,711	19–3–3 (10–2–2–2)
January 31	7:37 PM	vs. Colorado College	#2	Ralph Engelstad Arena • Grand Forks, North Dakota	ATTRM	Thome	W 1–0	10,882	20–3–3 (11–2–2–2)
February 1	7:07 PM	vs. Colorado College	#2	Ralph Engelstad Arena • Grand Forks, North Dakota		Thome	W 8–1	11,600	21–3–3 (12–2–2–2)
February 14	7:37 PM	vs. #6 Denver	#1	Ralph Engelstad Arena • Grand Forks, North Dakota	CBSSN	Thome	W 4–1	11,212	22–3–3 (13–2–2–2)
February 15	7:07 PM	vs. #6 Denver	#1	Ralph Engelstad Arena • Grand Forks, North Dakota		Thome	W 3–1	11,812	23–3–3 (14–2–2–2)
February 21	7:37 PM	at St. Cloud State	#1	Herb Brooks National Hockey Center • St. Cloud, Minnesota		Thome	T 3–3 ^{SOL}	4,794	23–3–4 (14–2–3–2)
February 22	6:07 PM	at St. Cloud State	#1	Herb Brooks National Hockey Center • St. Cloud, Minnesota	FSN	Thome	L 1–2	5,775	23–4–4 (14–3–3–2)
February 28	7:37 PM	vs. #16 Western Michigan	#3	Ralph Engelstad Arena • Grand Forks, North Dakota		Scheel	W 3–1	11,214	24–4–4 (15–3–3–2)
February 29	7:07 PM	vs. #16 Western Michigan	#3	Ralph Engelstad Arena • Grand Forks, North Dakota		Scheel	W 2–1 ^{OT}	11,837	25–4–4 (16–3–3–2)
March 6	7:07 PM	at Omaha	#2	Baxter Arena • Omaha, Nebraska		Scheel	L 1–4	6,126	25–5–4 (16–4–3–2)
March 7	7:07 PM	at Omaha	#2	Baxter Arena • Omaha, Nebraska		Thome	W 5–0	6,752	26–5–4 (17–4–3–2)
NCHC Tournament
Tournament Cancelled
*Non-conference game. ^{#}Rankings from USCHO.com Poll. All times are in Central Time.

== Scoring Statistics ==
Name	Position	Games	Goals	Assists	Points	PIM
Jordan Kawaguchi	C	33	15	30	45	8
Matt Kiersted	D	33	6	23	29	50
Shane Pinto	C	33	16	12	28	46
Westin Michaud	F	35	16	12	28	14
Collin Adams	LW	35	12	16	28	18
Jacob Bernard-Docker	D	32	7	18	25	12
Grant Mismash	C/LW	35	8	12	20	18
Cole Smith	LW	34	11	7	18	37
Jasper Weatherby	C/LW	35	10	8	18	20
Colton Poolman	D	31	4	13	17	4
Judd Caulfield	F	29	4	8	12	7
Harrison Blaisdell	C	32	2	10	12	16
Mark Senden	C	35	5	6	11	10
Jonny Tychonick	D	24	4	7	11	14
Dixon Bowen	C/RW	33	6	4	10	10
Gavin Hain	F	28	2	8	10	13
Andrew Peski	D	35	1	9	10	12
Gabe Bast	D	22	2	3	5	18
Jackson Keane	C	19	1	4	5	0
Ethan Frisch	D	31	1	4	5	17
Zach Yon	LW	16	0	4	4	0
Adam Scheel	G	26	0	2	2	0
Josh Rieger	D	9	1	0	1	6
Casey Johnson	D	16	1	0	1	2
Peter Thome	G	11	0	0	0	0
Bench	-	-	-	-	-	10
Total			135	220	355	362

== Goaltending statistics ==
Name	Games	Minutes	Wins	Losses	Ties	Goals against	Saves	Shut outs	SV %	GAA
Adam Scheel	26	1509	19	4	2	52	489	2	.904	2.07
Peter Thome	11	613	7	1	2	14	202	2	.935	1.37
Empty Net	-	7	-	-	-	2	-	-	-	-
Total	35	2130	26	5	4	68	691	4	.910	1.92

== Rankings ==
Poll	Week																							
Poll	Pre	1	2	3	4	5	6	7	8	9	10	11	12	13	14	15	16	17	18	19	20	21	22	23 (Final)
USCHO.com	18	18	16	16	14	10	9	5	3	3	2	1	1	1	1	2	2	1	1	1	3	2	3	2
USA Today	NR	NR	NR	NR	14	10	9	6	3	3	2	1	1	1	1	2	2	1	1	1	1	2	2	2

== Players drafted into the NHL ==
=== 2020 NHL entry draft ===
Round	Pick	Player	NHL team
1	5	Jake Sanderson†	Ottawa Senators
2	44	Tyler Kleven†	Ottawa Senators
4	111	Mitchell Miller† ‡	Arizona Coyotes
4	113	Jackson Kunz†	Vancouver Canucks
5	131	Matteo Costantini†	Buffalo Sabres
7	207	Ethan Bowen†	Anaheim Ducks

† incoming freshman
‡ Mitchell was subsequently removed from the program after information about his bullying of a handicapped minority classmate became public.
