= 2019–20 Omaha Mavericks men's ice hockey season =

- Conference: 6th NCHC
- Home ice: Baxter Arena

Rankings
- USCHO.com: NR
- USA Today/ US Hockey Magazine: NR

Record
- Overall: 14–17–5
- Conference: 8–13–3–0
- Home: 7–8–3
- Road: 7–9–2
- Neutral: 0–0–0

Coaches and captains
- Head coach: Mike Gabinet
- Assistant coaches: Dave Noël-Bernier; Paul Jerrard; Kirk Thompson; Jake McKamey
- Captain: Dean Stewart
- Alternate captain(s): Ryan Jones; Zach Jordan; Kevin Conley

The 2019–20 Omaha Mavericks men's ice hockey season was the 23rd season of play for the program and the 7th in the NCHC conference. The Mavericks represented the University of Nebraska Omaha and were coached by Mike Gabinet, in his 3rd season.

On March 12, 2020, NCHC announced that the tournament was cancelled due to the coronavirus pandemic, before any games were played.

== Roster ==
As of July 12, 2019.

No.	Nat.	Player	Class	Pos	Height	Weight	DoB	Hometown	Previous team	NHL rights
2	(United States)	Jason Smallidge	Sophomore	D	6' 2" (1.88 m)	184 lb (83 kg)	1998-05-20	Eagan, Minnesota	Youngstown Phantoms (USHL)	—
3	(Canada)	Kirby Proctor	Freshman	D	6' 3" (1.91 m)	190 lb (86 kg)	2001-04-20	Okotoks, Alberta	Des Moines Buccaneers (USHL)	—
4	(Canada)	Brandon Scanlin	Freshman	D	6' 3" (1.91 m)	190 lb (86 kg)	1999-06-02	Hamilton, Ontario	Brooks Bandits (AJHL)	—
5	(United States)	John Schuldt	Sophomore	D	6' 4" (1.93 m)	212 lb (96 kg)	1997-02-10	Minnetonka, Minnesota	Fargo Force (USHL)	—
7	(United States)	Nate Knoepke	Junior	D	6' 3" (1.91 m)	200 lb (91 kg)	1999-04-08	Farmington, Minnesota	Sioux City Musketeers (USHL)	—
9	(Canada)	Ryan Brushett	Freshman	F	5' 11" (1.8 m)	172 lb (78 kg)	1998-06-14	Verdun, Quebec	Powell River Kings (BCHL)	—
10	(United States)	Kevin Conley	Junior	F	5' 11" (1.8 m)	195 lb (88 kg)	1997-02-17	Wausau, Wisconsin	Sioux Falls Stampede (USHL)	—
11	(United States)	Nolan Sullivan	Freshman	F	5' 11" (1.8 m)	202 lb (92 kg)	1999-05-21	Eden Prairie, Minnesota	Muskegon Lumberjacks (USHL)	—
13	(United States)	Chayse Primeau	Sophomore	F	6' 3" (1.91 m)	184 lb (83 kg)	1997-09-15	Margate City, New Jersey	Dubuque Fighting Saints (USHL)	—
14	(Finland)	Teemu Pulkkinen	Senior	F	5' 9" (1.75 m)	192 lb (87 kg)	1995-03-13	Espoo, Finland	Sioux City Musketeers (USHL)	—
15	(United States)	Colby Enns	Freshman	D	6' 2" (1.88 m)	201 lb (91 kg)	1999-09-16	Minot, North Dakota	Central Illinois Flying Aces (USHL)	—
16	(Sweden)	Martin Sundberg	Junior	F	6' 4" (1.93 m)	183 lb (83 kg)	1996-12-04	Linköping, Sweden	Fargo Force (USHL)	—
17	(Canada)	Taylor Ward	Sophomore	F	6' 2" (1.88 m)	197 lb (89 kg)	1998-03-31	Kelowna, British Columbia	Penticton Vees (BCHL)	—
18	(Canada)	Dean Stewart	Senior	D	6' 2" (1.88 m)	189 lb (86 kg)	1998-06-12	Portage la Prairie, Manitoba	Portage Terriers (MJHL)	ARI, 188th overall 2016
19	(Canada)	Tristan Keck	Senior	F	5' 8" (1.73 m)	166 lb (75 kg)	1995-09-19	Morris, Manitoba	Winkler Flyers (MJHL)	—
20	(United States)	Ryan Jones	Senior	D	6' 2" (1.88 m)	197 lb (89 kg)	1996-05-26	Crown Point, Indiana	Lincoln Stars (USHL)	PIT, 121st overall 2016
21	(United States)	Noah Prokop	Freshman	F	6' 1" (1.85 m)	185 lb (84 kg)	2000-01-15	Highlands Ranch, Colorado	Green Bay Gamblers (USHL)	—
22	(United States)	Jordan Klehr	Senior (RS)	D	5' 11" (1.8 m)	195 lb (88 kg)	1997-03-18	Lino Lakes, Minnesota	Shattuck-Saint Mary's (Midget AAA)	—
23	(United States)	Travis Kothenbeutel	Sophomore	F	5' 9" (1.75 m)	165 lb (75 kg)	1997-01-10	Sauk Rapids, Minnesota	Austin Bruins (NAHL)	—
27	(United States)	Zach Jordan	Senior	F	6' 3" (1.91 m)	209 lb (95 kg)	1996-11-12	Collinsville, Illinois	Des Moines Buccaneers (USHL)	—
31	(United States)	Isaiah Saville	Freshman	G	6' 1" (1.85 m)	195 lb (88 kg)	2000-09-21	Anchorage, Alaska	Tri-City Storm (USHL)	VGK, 135th overall 2019
35	(United States)	Jacob Zab	Freshman	G	5' 10" (1.78 m)	176 lb (80 kg)	1998-04-12	Mentor, Ohio	Pittsburgh Vengeance (USPHL)	—
36	(Canada)	Austin Roden	Freshman	G	6' 2" (1.88 m)	181 lb (82 kg)	1998-04-30	Victoria, British Columbia	Merritt Centennials (BCHL)	—
40	(United States)	Tyler Weiss	Sophomore	F	5' 10" (1.78 m)	150 lb (68 kg)	2000-01-03	Raleigh, North Carolina	USNTDP (USHL)	COL, 109th overall 2018
45	(United States)	Joey Abate	Freshman	F	6' 2" (1.88 m)	170 lb (77 kg)	1998-09-26	Bloomingdale, Illinois	Youngstown Phantoms (USHL)	—
47	(Canada)	Alex Roy	Freshman	D	6' 6" (1.98 m)	210 lb (95 kg)	1998-09-21	Beaumont, Quebec	Jamestown Rebels (NAHL)	—
48	(United States)	Josh Boyer	Freshman	F	6' 3" (1.91 m)	200 lb (91 kg)	1999-10-07	Wasilla, Alaska	Sioux City Musketeers (USHL)	—

== Standings ==
2019–20 National Collegiate Hockey Conference Standings
	Conference record								Overall record					
	GP	W	L	T	3/SW	PTS	GF	GA	GP	W	L	T	GF	GA
#3 North Dakota †	24	17	4	3	2	56	86	49	35	26	5	4	135	68
#5 Minnesota–Duluth	24	17	5	2	0	53	89	53	34	22	10	2	114	77
#6 Denver	24	11	8	5	4	42	67	54	36	21	9	6	118	81
#16 Western Michigan	24	12	9	3	2	41	84	73	36	18	13	5	125	101
St. Cloud State	24	10	12	2	1	33	61	74	34	13	15	6	94	108
Omaha	24	8	13	3	0	27	63	75	36	14	17	5	108	107
Miami	24	5	16	3	2	20	61	89	34	8	21	5	92	127
Colorado College	24	4	17	3	1	16	48	96	34	11	20	3	86	123
Championship: Cancelled † indicates conference regular season champion; * indicates conference tournament champion Rankings: USCHO.com Top 20 Poll

== Schedule and results ==
Date	Time	Opponent^{#}	Rank^{#}	Site	TV	Decision	Result	Attendance	Record
Exhibition
October 7	7:07 PM	vs. Manitoba*		Baxter Arena • Omaha, Nebraska (Exhibition)		Roden	T 3–3 ^{OT}	1,875	
Regular season
October 11	7:07 PM	vs. Alabama–Huntsville*		Baxter Arena • Omaha, Nebraska		Saville	W 6–1	5,150	1–0–0
October 12	7:07 PM	vs. Alabama–Huntsville*		Baxter Arena • Omaha, Nebraska		Roden	W 5–0	4,525	2–0–0
October 18	6:00 PM	at #12 Ohio State*		Value City Arena • Columbus, Ohio		Saville	L 2–3	3,906	2–1–0
October 19	4:00 PM	at #12 Ohio State*		Value City Arena • Columbus, Ohio		Saville	W 2–1	4,385	3–1–0
October 31	10:07 PM	at Alaska Anchorage*		Wells Fargo Sports Complex • Anchorage, Alaska		Saville	W 4–3	723	4–1–0
November 1	10:07 PM	at Alaska Anchorage*		Wells Fargo Sports Complex • Anchorage, Alaska		Saville	T 3–3 ^{OT}	766	4–1–1
November 8	7:07 PM	vs. #12 Wisconsin*	#20	Baxter Arena • Omaha, Nebraska		Saville	L 2–5	5,605	4–2–1
November 9	7:07 PM	vs. #12 Wisconsin*	#20	Baxter Arena • Omaha, Nebraska		Saville	W 5–2	6,411	5–2–1
November 15	6:05 PM	at #20 Western Michigan	#19	Lawson Arena • Kalamazoo, Michigan		Saville	L 2–3	2,800	5–3–1 (0–1–0–0)
November 16	6:05 PM	at #20 Western Michigan	#19	Lawson Arena • Kalamazoo, Michigan		Saville	W 6–3	3,227	6–3–1 (1–1–0–0)
November 22	7:07 PM	vs. Miami	#18	Baxter Arena • Omaha, Nebraska		Saville	T 3–3 ^{3x3 OTL}	5,322	6–3–2 (1–1–1–0)
November 23	7:07 PM	vs. Miami	#18	Baxter Arena • Omaha, Nebraska		Roden	L 1–4	5,619	6–4–2 (1–2–1–0)
December 6	7:07 PM	vs. #14 Minnesota–Duluth	#18	Baxter Arena • Omaha, Nebraska		Saville	L 3–6	5,299	6–5–2 (1–3–1–0)
December 7	7:07 PM	vs. #14 Minnesota–Duluth	#18	Baxter Arena • Omaha, Nebraska		Roden	L 3–4	5,312	6–6–2 (1–4–1–0)
December 13	7:37 PM	at St. Cloud State		Herb Brooks National Hockey Center • St. Cloud, Minnesota	FSN+	Saville	L 1–4	3,703	6–7–2 (1–5–1–0)
December 14	6:07 PM	at St. Cloud State		Herb Brooks National Hockey Center • St. Cloud, Minnesota		Saville	W 4–3 ^{OT}	3,977	7–7–2 (2–5–1–0)
December 21	7:07 PM	vs. Arizona State*		Baxter Arena • Omaha, Nebraska		Roden	L 4–5	5,479	7–8–2 (2–5–1–0)
December 22	4:07 PM	vs. Arizona State*		Baxter Arena • Omaha, Nebraska		Roden	W 8–4	5,294	8–8–2 (2–5–1–0)
January 3	5:00 PM	at Maine*		Alfond Arena • Orono, Maine		Roden	T 2–2 ^{OT}	3,123	8–8–3 (2–5–1–0)
January 4	11:00 AM	at Maine*		Cross Insurance Arena • Portland, Maine		Roden	L 2–3	3,900	8–9–3 (2–5–1–0)
January 10	7:37 PM	at #1 North Dakota		Ralph Engelstad Arena • Grand Forks, North Dakota		Saville	W 6–3	10,907	9–9–3 (3–5–1–0)
January 11	7:07 PM	at #1 North Dakota		Ralph Engelstad Arena • Grand Forks, North Dakota		Saville	L 1–4	11,725	9–10–3 (3–6–1–0)
January 17	7:07 PM	vs. #4 Denver		Baxter Arena • Omaha, Nebraska		Saville	T 1–1 ^{SOL}	5,125	9–10–4 (3–6–2–0)
January 18	7:07 PM	vs. #4 Denver		Baxter Arena • Omaha, Nebraska		Saville	T 2–2 ^{3x3 OTL}	6,200	9–10–5 (3–6–3–0)
January 24	8:37 PM	at Colorado College		Broadmoor World Arena • Colorado Springs, Colorado		Roden	W 6–4	3,006	10–10–5 (4–6–3–0)
January 25	5:07 PM	at Colorado College		Broadmoor World Arena • Colorado Springs, Colorado		Saville	W 4–1	3,583	11–10–5 (5–6–3–0)
January 31	7:38 PM	vs. Western Michigan		Baxter Arena • Omaha, Nebraska	CBSSN	Saville	L 2–5	6,269	11–11–5 (5–7–3–0)
February 1	7:07 PM	vs. Western Michigan		Baxter Arena • Omaha, Nebraska		Saville	W 4–2	6,120	12–11–5 (6–7–3–0)
February 7	7:07 PM	at #6 Minnesota–Duluth		AMSOIL Arena • Duluth, Minnesota		Saville	L 2–3	6,194	12–12–5 (6–8–3–0)
February 8	7:07 PM	at #6 Minnesota–Duluth		AMSOIL Arena • Duluth, Minnesota		Roden	L 1–4	6,642	12–13–5 (6–9–3–0)
February 21	7:07 PM	vs. Colorado College		Baxter Arena • Omaha, Nebraska		Saville	W 5–0	5,630	13–13–5 (7–9–3–0)
February 22	7:07 PM	vs. Colorado College		Baxter Arena • Omaha, Nebraska		Saville	L 2–3	6,064	13–14–5 (7–10–3–0)
February 28	8:37 PM	at Miami		Steve Cady Arena • Oxford, Ohio		Saville	L 0–3	2,041	13–15–5 (7–11–3–0)
February 29	7:07 PM	at Miami		Steve Cady Arena • Oxford, Ohio		Saville	L 0–4	2,825	13–16–5 (7–12–3–0)
March 6	7:07 PM	vs. #2 North Dakota		Baxter Arena • Omaha, Nebraska		Roden	W 4–1	6,126	14–16–5 (8–12–3–0)
March 7	7:07 PM	vs. #2 North Dakota		Baxter Arena • Omaha, Nebraska		Roden	L 0–5	6,752	14–17–5 (8–13–3–0)
NCHC Tournament
Tournament Cancelled
*Non-conference game. ^{#}Rankings from USCHO.com Poll. All times are in Central Time.

== Scoring Statistics ==
Name	Position	Games	Goals	Assists	Points	PIM
Taylor Ward	F	32	16	11	27	42
Kevin Conley	F	36	12	15	27	29
Tyler Weiss	LW	35	4	18	22	27
Chayse Primeau	LW/RW	36	8	12	20	10
Joey Abate	LW	31	9	9	18	36
Teemu Pulkkinen	RW	33	7	11	'18	8
Ryan Brushett	C	36	2	16	18	4
Nolan Sullivan	F	33	7	10	17	47
Zach Jordan	RW	35	12	4	16	31
Tristan Keck	LW	23	6	9	15	6
Brandon Scanlin	D	36	3	11	14	16
Martin Sundberg	RW	33	5	7	12	26
Dean Stewart	D	34	2	10	12	26
Ryan Jones	D	36	2	9	11	37
Jason Smallidge	D	27	4	4	8	14
Kirby Proctor	D	32	1	6	7	12
Nate Knoepke	D	36	1	6	7	16
Josh Boyer	C	31	3	2	5	14
Noah Prokop	C	27	2	2	4	35
Travis Kothenbeutel	F	21	0	4	4	4
John Schuldt	D	26	2	1	3	33
Colby Enns	D	1	0	0	0	0
Austin Roden	G	11	0	0	0	0
Alex Roy	D	14	0	0	0	2
Isaiah Saville	G	28	0	0	0	0
Bench	-	-	-	-	-	20
Total			108	177	285	487

== Goaltending statistics ==
Name	Games	Minutes	Wins	Losses	Ties	Goals against	Saves	Shut outs	SV %	GAA
Isaiah Saville	28	1559	10	11	4	74	718	1	.907	2.85
Austin Roden	11	605	4	6	1	29	283	1	.907	2.87
Empty Net	-	20	-	-	-	4	-	-	-	-
Total	36	2185	14	17	5	107	1001	2	.903	2.94

== Rankings ==
Poll	Week																							
Poll	Pre	1	2	3	4	5	6	7	8	9	10	11	12	13	14	15	16	17	18	19	20	21	22	23 (Final)
USCHO.com	NR	NR	NR	NR	NR	20	19	18	18	18	NR	NR	NR	NR	NR	NR	NR	NR	NR	NR	NR	NR	NR	NR
USA Today	NR	NR	NR	NR	NR	NR	NR	NR	NR	NR	NR	NR	NR	NR	NR	NR	NR	NR	NR	NR	NR	NR	NR	NR
