= 2019–20 St. Cloud State Huskies men's ice hockey season =

- Conference: 5th NCHC
- Home ice: Herb Brooks National Hockey Center

Rankings
- USCHO.com: NR
- USA Today/US Hockey Magazine: NR

Record
- Overall: 13–15–6
- Conference: 10–12–2–1
- Home: 8–6–2
- Road: 4–9–4
- Neutral: 0–0–0

Coaches and captains
- Head coach: Brett Larson
- Assistant coaches: Mike Gibbons; Nick Oliver; Matt Bertram
- Captain: Jack Ahcan
- Alternate captain(s): Clark Kuster; Jack Poehling; Nick Poehling

The 2019–20 St. Cloud State Huskies men's ice hockey season was the 85th season of play for the program, the 23rd at the Division I level and the 7th in the NCHC conference. The Huskies represented St. Cloud State University and were coached by Brett Larson, in his 2nd season.

On March 12, 2020, NCHC announced that the tournament was cancelled due to the coronavirus pandemic, before any games were played.

== Roster ==
As of September 8, 2019.

No.	Nat.	Player	Class	Pos	Height	Weight	DoB	Hometown	Previous team	NHL rights
2	(United States)	Clark Kuster (A)	Senior	D	5' 10" (1.78 m)	187 lb (85 kg)	1995-01-28	St. Louis, Missouri	Cedar Rapids RoughRiders (USHL)	—
3	(United States)	Jack Poehling (A)	Senior	F	6' 0" (1.83 m)	187 lb (85 kg)	1996-08-29	Lakeville, Minnesota	Green Bay Gamblers (USHL)	—
5	(Czech Republic)	Ondřej Trejbal	Freshman	D	6' 3" (1.91 m)	195 lb (88 kg)	1999-04-21	Hamry nad Sázavou, Czech Republic	Minnesota Wilderness (NAHL)	—
6	(United States)	Luke Jaycox	Junior	D	6' 3" (1.91 m)	195 lb (88 kg)	1997-08-19	Warroad, Minnesota	Lincoln Stars (USHL)	—
7	(United States)	Nick Poehling (A)	Senior	F	5' 11" (1.8 m)	185 lb (84 kg)	1996-08-29	Lakeville, Minnesota	Green Bay Gamblers (USHL)	—
8	(Canada)	Tyler Anderson	Junior	D	6' 2" (1.88 m)	200 lb (91 kg)	1997-01-12	Winnipeg, Manitoba	Steinbach Pistons (MJHL)	—
9	(United States)	Spencer Meier	Sophomore	D	6' 4" (1.93 m)	207 lb (94 kg)	1999-04-15	Sartell, Minnesota	Fargo Force (USHL)	—
10	(Canada)	Kyler Kupka	Freshman	F	6' 0" (1.83 m)	185 lb (84 kg)	1999-05-11	Camrose, Alberta	Camrose Kodiaks (AJHL)	—
11	(United States)	Trevor Zins	Freshman	D	6' 0" (1.83 m)	190 lb (86 kg)	1998-07-23	St. Michael, Minnesota	Trail Smoke Eaters (BCHL)	—
12	(United States)	Jack Ahcan (C)	Senior	D	5' 8" (1.73 m)	185 lb (84 kg)	1997-05-18	Savage, Minnesota	Cedar Rapids (USHL)	—
13	(Finland)	Jami Krannila	Freshman	F	5' 10" (1.78 m)	163 lb (74 kg)	2000-10-03	Nokia, Finland	Sioux Falls Stampede (USHL)	—
14	(Canada)	Zach Okabe	Freshman	F	5' 8" (1.73 m)	170 lb (77 kg)	2001-01-04	Okotoks, Alberta	Grande Prairie Storm (AJHL)	—
15	(United States)	Micah Miller	Sophomore	F	5' 9" (1.75 m)	198 lb (90 kg)	1998-10-29	Grand Rapids, Minnesota	Sioux City Musketeers (USHL)	—
16	(United States)	Will Hammer	Junior	F	6' 2" (1.88 m)	215 lb (98 kg)	1996-02-06	St. Cloud, Minnesota	Minnesota Magicians (NAHL)	—
17	(United States)	Thomas Rocco	Freshman	F	5' 10" (1.78 m)	150 lb (68 kg)	1999-11-04	Midlothian, Virginia	Aberdeen Wings (NAHL)	—
18	(United States)	Brendan Bushy	Sophomore	D	6' 2" (1.88 m)	225 lb (102 kg)	1998-08-23	Thief River Falls, Minnesota	Dubuque Fighting Saints (USHL)	—
19	(United States)	Sam Hentges	Sophomore	F	6' 0" (1.83 m)	180 lb (82 kg)	1999-07-26	Fridley, Minnesota	Tri-City Storm (USHL)	MIN, 210th overall 2018
20	(United States)	Nolan Walker	Sophomore	F	5' 10" (1.78 m)	175 lb (79 kg)	1998-10-20	Anchorage, Alaska	Sioux Falls Stampede (USHL)	—
21	(United States)	Jake Wahlin	Senior	F	5' 10" (1.78 m)	178 lb (81 kg)	1996-11-09	Saint Paul, Minnesota	Tri-City Storm (USHL)	—
23	(United States)	Henry Enebak	Freshman	F	5' 11" (1.8 m)	190 lb (86 kg)	1998-07-29	Prior Lake, Minnesota	Carleton Place Canadians (CCHL)	—
25	(United States)	Nick Perbix	Sophomore	D	6' 4" (1.93 m)	200 lb (91 kg)	1998-06-15	Elk River, Minnesota	Omaha Lancers (USHL)	TBL, 169th overall 2017
26	(United States)	Easton Brodzinski	Junior	F	6' 2" (1.88 m)	205 lb (93 kg)	1996-08-13	Blaine, Minnesota	Green Bay Gamblers (USHL)	—
27	(United States)	Chase Brand	Freshman	F	5' 10" (1.78 m)	165 lb (75 kg)	1999-02-25	Nevis, Minnesota	Madison Capitols (USHL)	—
28	(United States)	Kevin Fitzgerald	Junior	F	6' 0" (1.83 m)	180 lb (82 kg)	1996-07-31	Oak Brook, Illinois	Aberdeen Wings (NAHL)	—
30	(United States)	Joey Lamoreaux	Freshman	G	6' 1" (1.85 m)	185 lb (84 kg)	1999-02-01	Shorewood, Wisconsin	Madison Capitols (USHL)	—
34	(Slovakia)	Dávid Hrenák	Junior	G	6' 2" (1.88 m)	190 lb (86 kg)	1998-05-05	Považska Bystrica, Slovakia	Green Bay Gamblers (USHL)	LAK, 144th overall 2018
40	(United States)	Jaxon Castor	Freshman	G	6' 3" (1.91 m)	200 lb (91 kg)	1997-03-14	Phoenix, Arizona	Shreveport Mudbugs (NAHL)	—

== Standings ==
2019–20 National Collegiate Hockey Conference Standings
	Conference record								Overall record					
	GP	W	L	T	3/SW	PTS	GF	GA	GP	W	L	T	GF	GA
#3 North Dakota †	24	17	4	3	2	56	86	49	35	26	5	4	135	68
#5 Minnesota–Duluth	24	17	5	2	0	53	89	53	34	22	10	2	114	77
#6 Denver	24	11	8	5	4	42	67	54	36	21	9	6	118	81
#16 Western Michigan	24	12	9	3	2	41	84	73	36	18	13	5	125	101
St. Cloud State	24	10	12	2	1	33	61	74	34	13	15	6	94	108
Omaha	24	8	13	3	0	27	63	75	36	14	17	5	108	107
Miami	24	5	16	3	2	20	61	89	34	8	21	5	92	127
Colorado College	24	4	17	3	1	16	48	96	34	11	20	3	86	123
Championship: Cancelled † indicates conference regular season champion; * indicates conference tournament champion Rankings: USCHO.com Top 20 Poll

== Schedule and results ==
Date	Time	Opponent^{#}	Rank^{#}	Site	TV	Decision	Result	Attendance	Record
Exhibition
October 6	5:07 PM	vs. Alberta*	#6	Herb Brooks National Hockey Center • St. Cloud, Minnesota (Exhibition)		Castor	W 4–2	3,491	
Regular season
October 11	7:07 PM	vs. Bemidji State*	#7	Sanford Center • Bemidji, Minnesota		Hrenák	T 4–4 ^{OT}	3,445	0–0–1
October 12	6:07 PM	vs. Bemidji State*	#7	Sanford Center • Bemidji, Minnesota		Hrenák	T 2–2 ^{OT}	3,792	0–0–2
October 25	7:37 PM	vs. #11 Northeastern*	#14	Herb Brooks National Hockey Center • St. Cloud, Minnesota		Hrenák	L 1–4	3,581	0–1–2
October 26	7:07 PM	vs. #11 Northeastern*	#14	Herb Brooks National Hockey Center • St. Cloud, Minnesota	FSN+	Hrenák	W 2–1	4,208	1–1–2
November 1	7:37 PM	vs. Princeton*	#16	Herb Brooks National Hockey Center • St. Cloud, Minnesota	FSN+	Hrenák	L 3–5	3,531	1–2–2
November 2	6:07 PM	vs. Princeton*	#16	Herb Brooks National Hockey Center • St. Cloud, Minnesota		Hrenák	T 5–5 ^{OT}	4,103	1–2–3
November 8	6:07 PM	vs. #16 Northern Michigan*		Berry Events Center • Marquette, Michigan		Hrenák	T 3–3 ^{OT}	3,020	1–2–4
November 9	5:00 PM	vs. #16 Northern Michigan*		Berry Events Center • Marquette, Michigan		Hrenák	W 5–4 ^{OT}	3,258	2–2–4
November 15	7:37 PM	vs. Colorado College		Herb Brooks National Hockey Center • St. Cloud, Minnesota		Hrenák	L 2–4	3,601	2–3–4 (0–1–0–0)
November 16	6:07 PM	vs. Colorado College		Herb Brooks National Hockey Center • St. Cloud, Minnesota		Hrenák	L 2–5	3,923	2–4–4 (0–2–0–0)
November 22	7:37 PM	at #5 North Dakota		Ralph Engelstad Arena • Grand Forks, North Dakota		Hrenák	L 4–2	11,223	2–5–4 (0–3–0–0)
November 23	7:07 PM	at #5 North Dakota		Ralph Engelstad Arena • Grand Forks, North Dakota		Hrenák	L 1–2 ^{OT}	11,747	2–6–4 (0–4–0–0)
December 6	6:05 PM	at Miami		Steve Cady Arena • Oxford, Ohio		Hrenák	W 2–1	2,016	3–6–4 (1–4–0–0)
December 7	6:05 PM	at Miami		Steve Cady Arena • Oxford, Ohio		Hrenák	W 5–3	1,863	4–6–4 (2–4–0–0)
December 13	7:37 PM	vs. Omaha		Herb Brooks National Hockey Center • St. Cloud, Minnesota	FSN+	Hrenák	W 4–1	3,703	5–6–4 (3–4–0–0)
December 14	6:07 PM	vs. Omaha		Herb Brooks National Hockey Center • St. Cloud, Minnesota		Castor	L 3–4 ^{OT}	3,977	5–7–4 (3–5–0–0)
Mariucci Classic
December 28	4:00 PM	at #2 Minnesota State*		3M Arena at Mariucci • Minneapolis, Minnesota (Mariucci Semifinal)		Castor	W 7–2	7,615	6–7–4 (3–5–0–0)
December 29	7:05 PM	at Minnesota*		3M Arena at Mariucci • Minneapolis, Minnesota (Mariucci Championship)	FSN+	Castor	L 1–4	6,772	6–8–4 (3–5–0–0)
January 10	8:07 PM	at #5 Denver		Magness Arena • Denver, Colorado	Altitude2	Hrenák	L 3–6	5,879	6–9–4 (3–6–0–0)
January 11	8:07 PM	at #5 Denver		Magness Arena • Denver, Colorado	Altitude2	Castor	L 3–5	5,966	6–10–4 (3–7–0–0)
January 17	7:37 PM	vs. #8 Minnesota–Duluth		Herb Brooks National Hockey Center • St. Cloud, Minnesota		Hrenák	W 2–1	4,166	7–10–4 (4–7–0–0)
January 18	4:07 PM	vs. #8 Minnesota–Duluth		Herb Brooks National Hockey Center • St. Cloud, Minnesota	FSN+	Hrenák	W 2–0	5,199	8–10–4 (5–7–0–0)
January 24	6:00 PM	at Western Michigan		Lawson Arena • Kalamazoo, Michigan		Hrenák	L 2–6	2,807	8–11–4 (5–8–0–0)
January 25	6:00 PM	at Western Michigan		Lawson Arena • Kalamazoo, Michigan		Castor	L 2–6	3,386	8–12–4 (5–9–0–0)
January 31	7:37 PM	vs. Miami		Herb Brooks National Hockey Center • St. Cloud, Minnesota		Hrenák	W 4–2	3,756	9–12–4 (6–9–0–0)
February 1	6:07 PM	vs. Miami		Herb Brooks National Hockey Center • St. Cloud, Minnesota		Hrenák	W 3–0	4,923	10–12–4 (7–9–0–0)
February 7	8:41 PM	at Colorado College		Broadmoor World Arena • Colorado Springs, Colorado	CBSSN	Hrenák	W 3–2	2,733	11–12–4 (8–9–0–0)
February 8	7:07 PM	at Colorado College		Broadmoor World Arena • Colorado Springs, Colorado		Hrenák	T 2–2 ^{SOL}	3,345	11–12–5 (8–9–1–0)
February 21	7:37 PM	vs. #1 North Dakota		Herb Brooks National Hockey Center • St. Cloud, Minnesota		Hrenák	T 3–3 ^{SOW}	4,794	11–12–6 (8–9–2–1)
February 22	6:07 PM	vs. #1 North Dakota		Herb Brooks National Hockey Center • St. Cloud, Minnesota	FSN	Hrenák	W 2–1	5,775	12–12–6 (9–9–2–1)
February 28	7:36 PM	vs. #6 Denver		Herb Brooks National Hockey Center • St. Cloud, Minnesota	CBSSN	Hrenák	W 5–1	4,454	13–12–6 (10–9–2–1)
February 29	7:07 PM	vs. #6 Denver		Herb Brooks National Hockey Center • St. Cloud, Minnesota	Fox Sports North	Hrenák	L 2–5	5,212	13–13–6 (10–10–2–1)
March 6	7:07 PM	at #5 Minnesota–Duluth		AMSOIL Arena • Duluth, Minnesota	FSN+	Hrenák	L 1–4	6,024	13–14–6 (10–11–2–1)
March 7	7:07 PM	at #5 Minnesota–Duluth		AMSOIL Arena • Duluth, Minnesota		Hrenák	L 1–6	6,579	13–15–6 (10–12–2–1)
NCHC Tournament
Tournament Cancelled
*Non-conference game. ^{#}Rankings from USCHO.com Poll. All times are in Central Time.

== Scoring Statistics ==
Name	Position	Games	Goals	Assists	Points	PIM
Easton Brodzinski	RW	34	12	15	27	37
Nick Poehling	F	34	8	18	26	28
Jack Ahcan	D	33	7	18	25	48
Sam Hentges	C	28	7	17	24	20
Jack Poehling	F	34	9	11	20	43
Micah Miller	C/RW	31	7	11	18	12
Nick Perbix	D	34	4	11	15	25
Jami Krannila	F	34	5	9	14	12
Kevin Fitzgerald	C	31	5	7	12	19
Chase Brand	C	31	5	7	12	27
Jake Wahlin	LW	34	4	8	12	6
Nolan Walker	C	31	2	10	12	12
Spencer Meier	D	34	4	6	10	8
Zach Okabe	RW	30	7	2	9	10
Ondřej Trejbal	D	28	0	6	6	16
Luke Jaycox	D	34	4	1	5	10
Will Hammer	F	32	3	1	4	4
Clark Kuster	D	27	1	3	4	25
Kyler Kupka	F	12	0	2	2	0
Thomas Rocco	F	15	0	2	2	2
Tyler Anderson	D	13	0	1	1	2
Joey Lamoreaux	G	2	0	0	0	0
Jaxon Castor	G	5	0	0	0	0
Dávid Hrenák	G	32	0	0	0	0
Brendan Bushy	D	32	0	0	0	2
Bench	-	-	-	-	-	10
Total			94	166	260	378

== Goaltending statistics ==
Name	Games	Minutes	Wins	Losses	Ties	Goals against	Saves	Shut outs	SV %	GAA
Dávid Hrenák	32	1801	12	11	6	83	799	2	.906	2.76
Joey Lamoreaux	2	55	0	0	0	3	25	0	.893	3.25
Jaxon Castor	5	197	1	4	0	12	73	0	.859	3.65
Empty Net	-	24	-	-	-	10	-	-	-	-
Total	34	2078	13	15	6	108	897	2	.893	3.12

== Rankings ==
Poll	Week																							
Poll	Pre	1	2	3	4	5	6	7	8	9	10	11	12	13	14	15	16	17	18	19	20	21	22	23 (Final)
USCHO.com	6	7	11	14	16	NR	NR	NR	NR	NR	NR	NR	NR	NR	NR	NR	NR	NR	NR	NR	NR	NR	NR	NR
USA Today	8	8	11	14	NR	NR	NR	NR	NR	NR	NR	NR	NR	NR	NR	NR	NR	NR	NR	NR	NR	NR	NR	NR

== Players drafted into the NHL ==
=== 2020 NHL entry draft ===
Round	Pick	Player	NHL team
6	168	Veeti Miettinen†	Toronto Maple Leafs

† incoming freshman
