= 2019–20 Miami RedHawks men's ice hockey season =

- Conference: 7th NCHC
- Home ice: Steve Cady Arena

Rankings
- USCHO.com: NR
- USA Today/ US Hockey Magazine: NR

Record
- Overall: 8–21–5
- Conference: 5–16–3–2
- Home: 4–10–3
- Road: 4–11–2
- Neutral: 0–0–0

Coaches and captains
- Head coach: Chris Bergeron
- Assistant coaches: Barry Schutte; Erid Rud
- Captain: Gordie Green

The 2019–20 Miami RedHawks men's ice hockey season was the 42nd season of play for the program and the 7th in the NCHC conference. The RedHawks represented Miami University and were coached by Chris Bergeron, in his 1st season.

On March 12, 2020, NCHC announced that the tournament was cancelled due to the coronavirus pandemic, before any games were played.

== Roster ==
As of June 28, 2019.

No.	Nat.	Player	Class	Pos	Height	Weight	DoB	Hometown	Previous team	NHL rights
3	(Canada)	Bray Crowder	Sophomore	D	6' 6" (1.98 m)	201 lb (91 kg)	1998-11-17	Sudbury, Ontario	Muskegon Lumberjacks (USHL)	—
4	(United States)	Andrew Sinard	Sophomore	D	6' 6" (1.98 m)	202 lb (92 kg)	1997-05-22	Brentwood, Tennessee	Aberdeen Wings (NAHL)	—
5	(United States)	Jack Clement	Freshman	D	6' 4" (1.93 m)	190 lb (86 kg)	1999-06-09	Detroit, Michigan	Des Moines Buccaneers (USHL)	—
6	(United States)	Alec Mahalak	Junior	D	5' 9" (1.75 m)	163 lb (74 kg)	1998-09-14	Monroe, Michigan	Youngstown Phantoms (USHL)	—
7	(United States)	Grant Frederic	Senior	D	6' 3" (1.91 m)	202 lb (92 kg)	1995-03-23	St. Louis, Missouri	Green Bay Gamblers (USHL)	—
8	(United States)	Chaz Switzer	Senior	D	6' 1" (1.85 m)	189 lb (86 kg)	1997-07-09	Muskegon, Michigan	Sioux Falls Stampede (USHL)	—
9	(United States)	Gordie Green (C)	Senior	F	5' 8" (1.73 m)	172 lb (78 kg)	1997-02-24	Ann Arbor, Michigan	Dubuque Fighting Saints (USHL)	—
10	(United States)	Ben Lown	Junior	F	5' 7" (1.7 m)	162 lb (73 kg)	1998-06-22	Newport Coast, California	Omaha Lancers (USHL)	—
11	(United States)	Rourke Russell	Junior	F	6' 0" (1.83 m)	173 lb (78 kg)	1998-02-25	Long Beach, California	Green Bay Gamblers (USHL)	—
12	(United States)	John Sladic	Freshman	F	5' 9" (1.75 m)	168 lb (76 kg)	1998-01-22	Novi, Michigan	Aberdeen Wings (NAHL)	—
13	(United States)	Derek Daschke	Sophomore	D	6' 2" (1.88 m)	191 lb (87 kg)	1998-10-13	Troy, Michigan	Chicago Steel (USHL)	—
14	(Canada)	Noah Jordan	Sophomore	F	6' 5" (1.96 m)	219 lb (99 kg)	1997-03-08	Toronto, Ontario	North York Rangers (OJHL)	—
18	(United States)	Monte Graham	Sophomore	F	5' 11" (1.8 m)	177 lb (80 kg)	1998-04-04	Hanover, Massachusetts	Muskegon Lumberjacks (USHL)	—
19	(United States)	Brian Hawkinson	Sophomore	F	5' 10" (1.78 m)	172 lb (78 kg)	1998-01-10	Kailua, Hawaii	Tri-City Storm (USHL)	—
20	(United States)	Christian Mohs	Junior (RS)	F	5' 11" (1.8 m)	182 lb (83 kg)	1995-07-14	Andover, Minnesota	Minot Minotauros (NAHL)	—
21	(Canada)	Ryan Savage	Freshman	F	5' 11" (1.8 m)	185 lb (84 kg)	2000-03-31	Montreal, Quebec	Muskegon Lumberjacks (USHL)	—
22	(Canada)	Carter Johnson	Senior	F	6' 3" (1.91 m)	201 lb (91 kg)	1995-10-04	Gimli, Manitoba	Corpus Christi IceRays (NAHL)	—
25	(United States)	Scott Corbett	Sophomore	F	6' 1" (1.85 m)	190 lb (86 kg)	1998-04-14	Carmel, Indiana	Dubuque Fighting Saints (USHL)	—
26	(United States)	Matt Barry	Sophomore	F	6' 0" (1.83 m)	165 lb (75 kg)	1997-09-01	Naperville, Illinois	Holy Cross Crusaders (AHA)	—
28	(United States)	Chase Pletzke	Freshman	F	5' 11" (1.8 m)	175 lb (79 kg)	2000-04-10	Bay City, Michigan	Langley Rivermen (BCHL)	—
31	(United States)	Ryan Larkin	Senior	G	6' 1" (1.85 m)	196 lb (89 kg)	1997-06-09	Clarkston, Michigan	Cedar Rapids RoughRiders (USHL)	—
33	(United States)	Ben Kraws	Freshman	G	6' 4" (1.93 m)	166 lb (75 kg)	2000-08-02	Cranbury, New Jersey	Sioux City Musketeers (USHL)	—
34	(Canada)	Alec Capstick	Freshman	D	6' 3" (1.91 m)	185 lb (84 kg)	1999-02-18	Langley, British Columbia	Langley Rivermen (BCHL)	—
36	(United States)	Grant Valentine	Junior	G	5' 11" (1.8 m)	175 lb (79 kg)	1997-01-30	Medina, Ohio	Wilkes-Barre/Scranton Knights (NAHL)	—
39	(United States)	Casey Gilling	Junior	F	6' 0" (1.83 m)	178 lb (81 kg)	1998-03-25	Gaylord, Michigan	Muskegon Lumberjacks (USHL)	—
67	(United States)	Phil Knies	Junior	F	5' 9" (1.75 m)	169 lb (77 kg)	1998-06-04	Phoenix, Arizona	Sioux City Musketeers (USHL)	—
85	(United States)	Karch Bachman	Senior	F	5' 11" (1.8 m)	185 lb (84 kg)	1997-03-10	Wolcottville, Indiana	Cedar Rapids RoughRiders (USHL)	FLA, 132nd overall 2015

== Standings ==
2019–20 National Collegiate Hockey Conference Standings
	Conference record								Overall record					
	GP	W	L	T	3/SW	PTS	GF	GA	GP	W	L	T	GF	GA
#3 North Dakota †	24	17	4	3	2	56	86	49	35	26	5	4	135	68
#5 Minnesota–Duluth	24	17	5	2	0	53	89	53	34	22	10	2	114	77
#6 Denver	24	11	8	5	4	42	67	54	36	21	9	6	118	81
#16 Western Michigan	24	12	9	3	2	41	84	73	36	18	13	5	125	101
St. Cloud State	24	10	12	2	1	33	61	74	34	13	15	6	94	108
Omaha	24	8	13	3	0	27	63	75	36	14	17	5	108	107
Miami	24	5	16	3	2	20	61	89	34	8	21	5	92	127
Colorado College	24	4	17	3	1	16	48	96	34	11	20	3	86	123
Championship: Cancelled † indicates conference regular season champion; * indicates conference tournament champion Rankings: USCHO.com Top 20 Poll

== Schedule and results ==
Date	Time	Opponent^{#}	Rank^{#}	Site	TV	Decision	Result	Attendance	Record
Regular season
October 6	5:00 PM	vs. #17 Bowling Green*		Steve Cady Arena • Oxford, Ohio		Larkin	L 4–7	2,507	0–1–0
October 11	7:05 PM	vs. New Hampshire*		Steve Cady Arena • Oxford, Ohio		Larkin	L 2–6	1,571	0–2–0
October 12	7:05 PM	vs. New Hampshire*		Steve Cady Arena • Oxford, Ohio		Kraws	T 4–4 ^{OT}	1,833	0–2–1
October 18	7:05 PM	vs. Ferris State*		Steve Cady Arena • Oxford, Ohio		Larkin	W 4–3	2,341	1–2–1
October 19	8:00 PM	vs. Ferris State*		Steve Cady Arena • Oxford, Ohio		Larkin	L 1–3	2,319	1–3–1
October 25	7:00 PM	at Colgate*		Class of 1965 Arena • Hamilton, New York		Kraws	T 3–3 ^{OT}	1,195	1–3–2
October 26	4:00 PM	at Colgate*		Class of 1965 Arena • Hamilton, New York		Larkin	W 2–0	1,143	2–3–2
November 1	7:05 PM	vs. USNTDP*		Steve Cady Arena • Oxford, Ohio (Exhibition)		Valentine	W 4–2	1,931	
November 8	8:37 PM	at #10 North Dakota		Ralph Engelstad Arena • Grand Forks, North Dakota		Larkin	L 1–7	10,425	2–4–2 (0–1–0–0)
November 9	8:07 PM	at #10 North Dakota		Ralph Engelstad Arena • Grand Forks, North Dakota		Larkin	L 4–5	10,775	2–5–2 (0–2–0–0)
November 15	7:05 PM	vs. #6 Minnesota–Duluth		Steve Cady Arena • Oxford, Ohio		Larkin	W 3–1	2,416	3–5–2 (1–2–0–0)
November 16	7:05 PM	vs. #6 Minnesota–Duluth		Steve Cady Arena • Oxford, Ohio		Larkin	L 2–3	2,879	3–6–2 (1–3–0–0)
November 22	8:07 PM	at #18 Omaha		Baxter Arena • Omaha, Nebraska		Valentine	T 3–3 ^{3x3 OTW}	5,322	3–6–3 (1–3–1–1)
November 23	8:07 PM	at #18 Omaha		Baxter Arena • Omaha, Nebraska		Kraws	W 4–1	5,619	4–6–3 (2–3–1–1)
November 29	4:05 PM	at Connecticut*		XL Center • Hartford, Connecticut		Larkin	L 4–6	3,006	4–7–3 (2–3–1–1)
November 30	4:05 PM	at Connecticut*		XL Center • Hartford, Connecticut		Kraws	L 3–4	2,735	4–8–3 (2–3–1–1)
December 6	7:05 PM	vs. St. Cloud State		Steve Cady Arena • Oxford, Ohio		Valentine	L 1–2	2,016	4–9–3 (2–4–1–1)
December 7	7:05 PM	vs. St. Cloud State		Steve Cady Arena • Oxford, Ohio		Valentine	L 3–5	1,863	4–10–3 (2–5–1–1)
December 30	7:37 PM	at #11 Bowling Green*		Slater Family Ice Arena • Bowling Green, Ohio		Larkin	W 4–2	3,263	5–10–3 (2–5–1–1)
January 10	9:37 PM	at Colorado College		Broadmoor World Arena • Colorado Springs, Colorado		Larkin	W 6–1	2,945	6–10–3 (3–5–1–1)
January 11	8:07 PM	at Colorado College		Broadmoor World Arena • Colorado Springs, Colorado		Larkin	L 2–4	3,391	6–11–3 (3–6–1–1)
January 17	6:30 PM	vs. #1 North Dakota		Steve Cady Arena • Oxford, Ohio	CBSSN	Larkin	T 4–4 ^{SOL}	3,391	6–11–4 (3–6–2–1)
January 18	7:00 PM	vs. #1 North Dakota		Steve Cady Arena • Oxford, Ohio		Kraws	L 3–5	2,241	6–12–4 (3–7–2–1)
January 24	7:05 PM	vs. #5 Denver		Steve Cady Arena • Oxford, Ohio		Larkin	L 2–3	1,748	6–13–4 (3–8–2–1)
January 25	7:05 PM	vs. #5 Denver		Steve Cady Arena • Oxford, Ohio		Kraws	L 2–5	2,217	6–14–4 (3–9–2–1)
January 31	8:37 PM	at St. Cloud State		Herb Brooks National Hockey Center • St. Cloud, Minnesota		Larkin	L 2–4	3,756	6–15–4 (3–10–2–1)
February 1	7:07 PM	at St. Cloud State		Herb Brooks National Hockey Center • St. Cloud, Minnesota		Kraws	L 0–3	4,923	6–16–4 (3–11–2–1)
February 14	7:05 PM	vs. Western Michigan		Steve Cady Arena • Oxford, Ohio		Larkin	T 2–2 ^{3x3 OTW}	2,445	6–16–5 (3–11–3–2)
February 15	7:05 PM	vs. Western Michigan		Steve Cady Arena • Oxford, Ohio		Kraws	L 1–4	2,851	6–17–5 (3–12–3–2)
February 21	9:07 PM	at #7 Denver		Magness Arena • Denver, Colorado		Larkin	L 3–7	5,626	6–18–5 (3–13–3–2)
February 22	9:07 PM	at #7 Denver		Magness Arena • Denver, Colorado	Altitude2	Kraws	L 0–7	6,101	6–19–5 (3–14–3–2)
February 28	7:05 PM	vs. Omaha		Steve Cady Arena • Oxford, Ohio		Larkin	W 3–0	2,041	7–19–5 (4–14–3–2)
February 29	7:05 PM	vs. Omaha		Steve Cady Arena • Oxford, Ohio		Larkin	W 4–0	2,825	8–19–5 (5–14–3–2)
March 6	7:00 PM	at #17 Western Michigan		Lawson Arena • Kalamazoo, Michigan		Larkin	L 2–5	2,675	8–20–5 (5–15–3–2)
March 7	7:00 PM	at #17 Western Michigan		Lawson Arena • Kalamazoo, Michigan		Kraws	L 4–8	3,069	8–21–5 (5–16–3–2)
NCHC Tournament
Tournament Cancelled
*Non-conference game. ^{#}Rankings from USCHO.com Poll. All times are in Eastern Time.

== Scoring Statistics ==
Name	Position	Games	Goals	Assists	Points	PIM
Gordie Green	RW	34	14	22	36	26
Karch Bachman	LW	34	10	21	31	18
Casey Gilling	C	34	9	22	31	28
Derek Daschke	D	34	10	13	23	18
Ryan Savage	RW	29	7	7	14	16
Chase Pletzke	C	28	6	8	14	14
John Sladic	F	32	7	6	13	6
Monte Graham	F	34	5	8	13	24
Rourke Russell	D	33	1	12	13	22
Matt Barry	F	17	3	8	11	18
Phil Knies	LW/C	32	3	8	11	12
Jack Clement	D	33	4	5	9	20
Bray Crowder	D	27	1	7	8	31
Noah Jordan	RW	15	2	4	6	0
Christian Mohs	F	21	2	2	4	4
Grant Frederic	D	27	2	2	4	6
Ben Lown	C	26	1	3	4	2
Andrew Sinard	D	27	0	4	4	14
Scott Corbett	C	29	0	4	4	16
Carter Johnson	F	23	2	1	3	19
Alec Capstick	D	26	1	2	3	2
Alec Mahalak	D	21	1	1	2	6
Brian Hawkinson	RW	26	0	2	2	10
Chaz Switzer	D	4	1	0	1	4
Ryan Larkin	G	22	0	1	1	0
Grant Valentine	G	4	0	0	0	0
Ben Kraws	G	11	0	0	0	0
Bench	-	-	-	-	-	2
Total			92	173	265	338

== Goaltending statistics ==
Name	Games	Minutes	Wins	Losses	Ties	Goals against	Saves	Shut outs	SV %	GAA
Grant Valentine	4	216	0	2	1	12	89	0	.881	3.32
Ryan Larkin	22	2111	7	12	2	70	639	3	.901	3.47
Ben Kraws	11	611	1	7	2	42	283	0	.871	4.12
Empty Net	-	26	-	-	-	3	-	-	-	-
Total	34	2065	8	21	5	127	1011	3	.888	3.69

== Rankings ==
Poll	Week																							
Poll	Pre	1	2	3	4	5	6	7	8	9	10	11	12	13	14	15	16	17	18	19	20	21	22	23 (Final)
USCHO.com	NR	NR	NR	NR	NR	NR	NR	NR	NR	NR	NR	NR	NR	NR	NR	NR	NR	NR	NR	NR	NR	NR	NR	NR
USA Today	NR	NR	NR	NR	NR	NR	NR	NR	NR	NR	NR	NR	NR	NR	NR	NR	NR	NR	NR	NR	NR	NR	NR	NR

== Players drafted into the NHL ==
=== 2020 NHL entry draft ===
Round	Pick	Player	NHL team
7	187	Kienan Draper†	Detroit Red Wings

† incoming freshman
