= 2019–20 Denver Pioneers men's ice hockey season =

Collegiate team season

- Conference: 3rd NCHC
- Home ice: Magness Arena

Rankings
- USCHO: 6
- USA Today: 6

Record
- Overall: 21–9–6
- Conference: 11–8–5–4
- Home: 13–4–1
- Road: 8–5–5
- Neutral: 0–0–0

Coaches and captains
- Head coach: David Carle
- Assistant coaches: Tavis MacMillan; Dallas Ferguson; Corey Wogtech
- Captain: Ian Mitchell
- Alternate captain(s): Michael Davies; Tyson McLellan

The 2019–20 Denver Pioneers men's ice hockey season was the 71st season of play for the program and the 7th in the NCHC conference. The Pioneers represented the University of Denver and were coached by David Carle, in his second season.

On March 12, 2020, NCHC announced that the tournament was cancelled due to the coronavirus pandemic, before any games were played.

== Roster ==
As of June 28, 2019.

No.	Nat.	Player	Class	Pos	Height	Weight	DoB	Hometown	Previous team	NHL rights
1	(United States)	Devin Cooley	Junior	G	6' 4" (1.93 m)	178 lb (81 kg)	1997-05-25	Los Gatos, California	Wenatchee Wild (BCHL)	—
2	(United States)	Erich Fear	Senior	D	6' 4" (1.93 m)	214 lb (97 kg)	1997-05-08	Winnetka, Illinois	Springfield Jr. Blues (NAHL)	—
4	(Canada)	Griffin Mendel	Junior	D	6' 4" (1.93 m)	216 lb (98 kg)	1999-02-18	Kelowna, British Columbia	Penticton Vees (BCHL)	—
7	(Canada)	Brett Stapley	Sophomore	F	5' 10" (1.78 m)	176 lb (80 kg)	1999-02-23	Campbell River, British Columbia	Vernon Vipers (BCHL)	MTL, 190th overall 2018
8	(United States)	Jay Feiwell	Freshman	F	5' 10" (1.78 m)	195 lb (88 kg)	1999-02-17	Carmel, Indiana	Shreveport Mudbugs (NAHL)	—
9	(United States)	Tyson McLellan (A)	Senior	F	5' 9" (1.75 m)	162 lb (73 kg)	1996-02-17	San Jose, California	Madison Capitols (USHL)	—
10	(Finland)	Jaakko Heikkinen	Junior	F	6' 1" (1.85 m)	184 lb (83 kg)	1997-03-17	Helsinki, Finland	Jokerit U20 (Nuorten SM-liiga)	—
11	(Canada)	Tyler Ward	Sophomore	F	5' 10" (1.78 m)	174 lb (79 kg)	1999-08-19	Kamloops, British Columbia	Tri-City Storm (USHL)	—
12	(Canada)	Kohen Olischefski	Junior	F	6' 1" (1.85 m)	181 lb (82 kg)	1998-02-01	Abbotsford, British Columbia	Chilliwack Chiefs (BCHL)	—
13	(Canada)	Liam Finlay	Senior	F	5' 7" (1.7 m)	154 lb (70 kg)	1997-02-18	Kelowna, British Columbia	Vernon Vipers (BCHL)	—
15	(Canada)	Ian Mitchell (C)	Junior	D	5' 11" (1.8 m)	175 lb (79 kg)	1999-01-18	Calahoo, Alberta	Spruce Grove Saints (AJHL)	CHI, 57th overall 2017
16	(United States)	Jake Durflinger	Junior	F	5' 8" (1.73 m)	167 lb (76 kg)	1997-10-06	Walnut Creek, California	Bloomington Thunder (USHL)	—
17	(United States)	Slava Demin	Sophomore	D	6' 2" (1.88 m)	194 lb (88 kg)	2000-04-04	Cypress, California	Wenatchee Wild (BCHL)	VGK, 99th overall 2018
18	(Canada)	Ryan Barrow	Junior	F	6' 2" (1.88 m)	180 lb (82 kg)	1997-02-15	Banff, Alberta	Langley Rivermen (BCHL)	—
19	(United States)	Cole Guttman	Sophomore	F	5' 9" (1.75 m)	172 lb (78 kg)	1999-04-06	Los Angeles, California	Dubuque Fighting Saints (USHL)	TBL, 180th overall 2017
20	(Norway)	Emilio Pettersen	Sophomore	F	5' 10" (1.78 m)	170 lb (77 kg)	2000-04-03	Manglerud, Norway	Muskegon Lumberjacks (USHL)	CGY, 167th overall 2018
21	(United States)	Michael Davies (A)	Senior	D	5' 8" (1.73 m)	164 lb (74 kg)	1997-01-26	St. Louis, Missouri	Waterloo Black Hawks (USHL)	—
23	(United States)	Lane Krenzen	Freshman	D	5' 10" (1.78 m)	185 lb (84 kg)	1998-02-21	Twig, Minnesota	Austin Bruins (NAHL)	—
24	(United States)	Bobby Brink	Freshman	F	5' 8" (1.73 m)	165 lb (75 kg)	2001-07-08	Minnetonka, Minnesota	Sioux City Musketeers (USHL)	PHI, 34th overall 2019
26	(United States)	Jack Doremus	Junior	F	6' 0" (1.83 m)	183 lb (83 kg)	1997-04-15	Aspen, Colorado	Lincoln Stars (USHL)	—
27	(United States)	Kyle Mayhew	Sophomore	D	5' 7" (1.7 m)	150 lb (68 kg)	1997-12-25	Anaheim Hills, California	Fairbanks Ice Dogs (NAHL)	—
28	(Canada)	Brett Edwards	Freshman	F	5' 11" (1.8 m)	190 lb (86 kg)	1998-09-10	Grande Prairie, Alberta	Drumheller Dragons (AJHL)	—
30	(Sweden)	Magnus Chrona	Freshman	G	6' 4" (1.93 m)	194 lb (88 kg)	2000-08-28	Skellefteå, Sweden	Skellefteå AIK J20 (J20 SuperElit)	TBL, 152nd overall 2018
31	(United States)	Michael Corson	Sophomore	G	6' 3" (1.91 m)	177 lb (80 kg)	1999-04-22	Darien, Illinois	Cowichan Valley Capitals (BCHL)	—
32	(Canada)	Justin Lee	Freshman	D	5' 11" (1.8 m)	182 lb (83 kg)	2000-03-14	Waskada, Manitoba	Fargo Force (USHL)	—
37	(United States)	Hank Crone	Sophomore	F	5' 9" (1.75 m)	157 lb (71 kg)	1998-02-19	Dallas, Texas	Fargo Force (USHL)	—

== Standings ==
2019–20 National Collegiate Hockey Conference Standings
	Conference record								Overall record					
	GP	W	L	T	3/SW	PTS	GF	GA	GP	W	L	T	GF	GA
#3 North Dakota †	24	17	4	3	2	56	86	49	35	26	5	4	135	68
#5 Minnesota–Duluth	24	17	5	2	0	53	89	53	34	22	10	2	114	77
#6 Denver	24	11	8	5	4	42	67	54	36	21	9	6	118	81
#16 Western Michigan	24	12	9	3	2	41	84	73	36	18	13	5	125	101
St. Cloud State	24	10	12	2	1	33	61	74	34	13	15	6	94	108
Omaha	24	8	13	3	0	27	63	75	36	14	17	5	108	107
Miami	24	5	16	3	2	20	61	89	34	8	21	5	92	127
Colorado College	24	4	17	3	1	16	48	96	34	11	20	3	86	123
Championship: Cancelled † indicates conference regular season champion; * indicates conference tournament champion Rankings: USCHO.com Top 20 Poll

== Schedule and results ==
Date	Time	Opponent^{#}	Rank^{#}	Site	TV	Decision	Result	Attendance	Record
Regular season
October 5	9:07 PM	at Alaska*	#2	Carlson Center • Fairbanks, Alaska		Chrona	W 4–3	1,511	1–0–0
October 6	7:07 PM	at Alaska*	#2	Carlson Center • Fairbanks, Alaska		Chrona	W 3–0	1,028	2–0–0
October 11	5:37 PM	at Lake Superior State*	#2	Taffy Abel Arena • Sault Ste. Marie, Michigan		Chrona	W 3–1	1,778	3–0–0
October 12	5:07 PM	at Lake Superior State*	#2	Taffy Abel Arena • Sault Ste. Marie, Michigan		Chrona	W 4–3	2,414	4–0–0
October 18	7:07 PM	vs. #6 Boston College*	#1	Magness Arena • Denver, Colorado		Chrona	W 3–0	6,038	5–0–0
October 19	7:07 PM	vs. #6 Boston College*	#1	Magness Arena • Denver, Colorado		Chrona	W 6–4	6,038	6–0–0
November 1	7:07 PM	vs. Niagara*	#1	Magness Arena • Denver, Colorado		Chrona	W 6–2	5,687	7–0–0
November 2	7:07 PM	vs. Niagara*	#1	Magness Arena • Denver, Colorado		Corson	W 4–0	5,805	8–0–0
November 8	6:07 PM	at #7 Minnesota–Duluth	#1	AMSOIL Arena • Duluth, Minnesota		Chrona	T 3–3 ^{SOW}	5,374	8–0–1 (0–0–1–1)
November 9	6:07 PM	at #7 Minnesota–Duluth	#1	AMSOIL Arena • Duluth, Minnesota		Chrona	L 2–5	5,874	8–1–1 (0–1–1–1)
November 15	7:07 PM	vs. #9 North Dakota	#2	Magness Arena • Denver, Colorado		Chrona	T 1–1 ^{3x3 OTL}	6,056	8–1–2 (0–1–2–1)
November 16	7:07 PM	vs. #9 North Dakota	#2	Magness Arena • Denver, Colorado		Chrona	L 1–4	6,308	8–2–2 (0–2–2–1)
November 22	7:07 PM	vs. #20 Western Michigan	#4	Magness Arena • Denver, Colorado		Chrona	L 1–2	4,527	8–3–2 (0–3–2–1)
November 23	7:07 PM	vs. #20 Western Michigan	#4	Magness Arena • Denver, Colorado		Cooley	W 6–1	4,942	9–3–2 (1–3–2–1)
December 6	7:05 PM	at #20 Arizona State*	#4	Oceanside Ice Arena • Tempe, Arizona		Chrona	L 1–4	917	9–4–2 (1–3–2–1)
December 7	4:35 PM	at #20 Arizona State*	#4	Gila River Arena • Glendale, Arizona		Chrona	T 2–2 ^{OT}	2,800	9–4–3 (1–3–2–1)
December 13	7:07 PM	at Colorado College	#8	Magness Arena • Denver, Colorado	Altitude2	Cooley	W 3–0	5,758	10–4–3 (2–3–2–1)
December 14	7:10 PM	vs. Colorado College	#8	Broadmoor World Arena • Colorado Springs, Colorado	ATTRM	Chrona	W 3–1	4,400	11–4–3 (3–3–2–1)
January 3	7:07 PM	vs. #9 Massachusetts*	#7	Magness Arena • Denver, Colorado	Altitude, NESN+	Chrona	W 4–2	6,017	12–4–3 (3–3–2–1)
January 4	7:07 PM	vs. #9 Massachusetts*	#7	Magness Arena • Denver, Colorado		Chrona	W 4–3	5,986	13–4–3 (3–3–2–1)
January 10	7:07 PM	vs. St. Cloud State	#5	Magness Arena • Denver, Colorado	Altitude2	Chrona	W 6–3	5,879	14–4–3 (4–3–2–1)
January 11	7:07 PM	vs. St. Cloud State	#5	Magness Arena • Denver, Colorado	Altitude2	Chrona	W 5–3	5,966	15–4–3 (5–3–2–1)
January 17	6:07 PM	at Omaha	#4	Baxter Arena • Omaha, Nebraska		Chrona	T 1–1 ^{SOW}	5,125	15–4–4 (5–3–3–2)
January 18	6:07 PM	at Omaha	#4	Baxter Arena • Omaha, Nebraska		Cooley	T 2–2 ^{3x3 OTW}	6,200	15–4–5 (5–3–4–3)
January 24	5:05 PM	at Miami	#5	Steve Cady Arena • Oxford, Ohio		Chrona	W 3–2	1,748	16–4–5 (6–3–4–3)
January 25	5:05 PM	at Miami	#5	Steve Cady Arena • Oxford, Ohio		Cooley	W 5–2	1,748	17–4–5 (7–3–4–3)
January 31	7:07 PM	vs. #10 Minnesota–Duluth	#4	Magness Arena • Denver, Colorado	Altitude2	Chrona	L 2–3	6,477	17–5–5 (7–4–4–3)
February 1	7:07 PM	vs. #10 Minnesota–Duluth	#4	Magness Arena • Denver, Colorado	Altitude2	Cooley	L 1–4	6,181	17–6–5 (7–5–4–3)
February 14	6:41 PM	at #1 North Dakota	#6	Ralph Engelstad Arena • Grand Forks, North Dakota	CBSSN	Cooley	L 1–4	11,212	17–7–5 (7–6–4–3)
February 15	6:07 PM	at #1 North Dakota	#6	Ralph Engelstad Arena • Grand Forks, North Dakota		Chrona	L 1–3	11,812	17–8–5 (7–7–4–3)
February 21	7:07 PM	vs. Miami	#7	Magness Arena • Denver, Colorado		Chrona	W 7–3	5,626	18–8–5 (8–7–4–3)
February 22	7:07 PM	vs. Miami	#7	Magness Arena • Denver, Colorado	Altitude2	Cooley	W 7–0	6,101	19–8–5 (9–7–4–3)
February 28	6:37 PM	at St. Cloud State	#6	Herb Brooks National Hockey Center • St. Cloud, Minnesota	CBSSN	Cooley	L 1–5	4,454	19–9–5 (9–8–4–3)
February 29	6:07 PM	at St. Cloud State	#6	Herb Brooks National Hockey Center • St. Cloud, Minnesota	FSN+	Chrona	W 5–2	5,212	20–9–5 (10–8–4–3)
March 6	7:37 PM	at Colorado College	#6	Broadmoor World Arena • Colorado Springs, Colorado		Chrona	T 2–2 ^{SOW}	4,466	20–9–6 (10–8–5–4)
March 7	7:07 PM	vs. Colorado College	#6	Magness Arena • Denver, Colorado	CBSSN	Chrona	W 5–1	6,527	21–9–6 (11–8–5–4)
NCHC Tournament
Tournament Cancelled
*Non-conference game. ^{#}Rankings from USCHO.com Poll. All times are in Mountain Time.

== Scoring Statistics ==
Name	Position	Games	Goals	Assists	Points	PIM
Emilio Pettersen	C	36	13	22	35	16
Ian Mitchell	D	36	10	22	32	16
Brett Stapley	C	35	5	25	30	41
Cole Guttman	C	35	14	14	28	22
Liam Finlay	RW	36	5	23	28	28
Bobby Brink	RW	28	11	13	24	12
Kohen Olischefski	RW	36	9	11	20	14
Tyler Ward	LW	36	10	9	19	6
Hank Crone	LW	31	6	10	16	10
Jaakko Heikkinen	F	32	6	8	14	4
Ryan Barrow	F	27	5	7	12	8
Tyson McLellan	C	36	5	6	11	30
Jake Durflinger	RW	35	5	5	10	46
Griffin Mendel	D	36	3	6	9	10
Slava Demin	D	34	2	7	9	50
Brett Edwards	F	28	4	3	7	16
Justin Lee	D	31	2	4	6	22
Michael Davies	D	34	1	4	5	20
Kyle Mayhew	D	36	1	4	5	20
Jack Doremus	F	19	1	3	4	6
Erich Fear	D	20	0	2	2	4
Magnus Chrona	G	27	0	2	2	4
Michael Corson	G	1	0	0	0	0
Jay Feiwell	LW	3	0	0	0	0
Lane Krenzen	D	4	0	0	0	0
Devin Cooley	G	9	0	0	0	0
Bench	-	-	-	-	-	10
Total			118	210	328	415

== Goaltending statistics ==
Name	Games	Minutes	Wins	Losses	Ties	Goals against	Saves	Shut outs	SV %	GAA
Michael Corson	1	60	1	0	0	0	16	1	1.000	0.00
Devin Cooley	9	519	4	3	2	18	177	2	.908	2.08
Magnus Chrona	27	1593	16	6	4	57	659	2	.920	2.15
Empty Net	-	17	-	-	-	6	-	-	-	-
Total	36	2190	21	9	6	81	852	5	.913	2.22

== Rankings ==
Poll	Week																							
Poll	Pre	1	2	3	4	5	6	7	8	9	10	11	12	13	14	15	16	17	18	19	20	21	22	23 (Final)
USCHO.com	2	2	1	1	1	1	2	4	4	4	8	6	7	5	4	5	4	6	6	7	6	6	6	6
USA Today	2	2	1	1	1	1	1	4	5	4	8	6	5	5	4	5	4	5	5	7	6	6	6	6

== Players drafted into the NHL ==
=== 2020 NHL entry draft ===
Round	Pick	Player	NHL team
4	95	Michael Benning†	Florida Panthers
4	100	Carter Savoie†	Edmonton Oilers
7	195	Wyatt Schingoethe†	Toronto Maple Leafs

† incoming freshman
