= 2019–20 Minnesota Duluth Bulldogs men's ice hockey season =

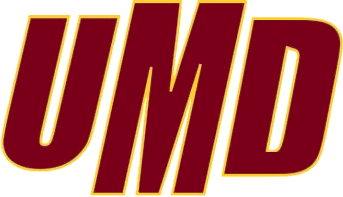
- Conference: 2nd NCHC
- Home ice: AMSOIL Arena

Rankings
- USCHO: #5
- USA Today: #5

Record
- Overall: 22–10–2
- Conference: 17–5–2–0
- Home: 9–4–2
- Road: 8–5–0
- Neutral: 0–0–0

Coaches and captains
- Head coach: Scott Sandelin
- Assistant coaches: Jason Herter; Adam Krause; Brant Nicklin
- Captain(s): Nick Wolff; Hunter Shepard

The 2019–20 Minnesota Duluth Bulldogs men's ice hockey season was the 76th season of play for the program and the 7th in the NCHC conference. The Bulldogs represented the University of Minnesota Duluth and were coached by Scott Sandelin, in his 20th season.

On March 12, 2020, NCHC announced that the tournament was cancelled due to the coronavirus pandemic, before any games were played.

== Roster ==
As of September 8, 2019.

No.	Nat.	Player	Class	Pos	Height	Weight	DoB	Hometown	Previous team	NHL rights
3	(United States)	Matt Anderson	Junior	D	6' 0" (1.83 m)	195 lb (88 kg)	1999-04-11	Shakopee, Minnesota	Holy Family High School (USHS–MN)	—
4	(United States)	Dylan Samberg	Junior	D	6' 4" (1.93 m)	215 lb (98 kg)	1999-01-24	Hermantown, Minnesota	Hermantown High School (USHS–MN)	WPG, 43rd overall 2017
5	(United States)	Nick Wolff	Senior	D	6' 5" (1.96 m)	230 lb (104 kg)	1996-07-21	Eagan, Minnesota	Des Moines Buccaneers (USHL)	—
6	(United States)	Louie Roehl	Junior	D	5' 10" (1.78 m)	185 lb (84 kg)	1998-04-09	Eden Prairie, Minnesota	Minnesota Wilderness (NAHL)	—
7	(United States)	Scott Perunovich	Junior	D	5' 10" (1.78 m)	175 lb (79 kg)	1998-08-18	Hibbing, Minnesota	Cedar Rapids RoughRiders (USHL)	STL, 45th overall 2018
8	(United States)	Hunter Lellig	Sophomore	D	6' 2" (1.88 m)	185 lb (84 kg)	1999-02-08	Waterloo, Iowa	Waterloo Black Hawks (USHL)	—
10	(United States)	Kobe Roth	Junior	F	5' 9" (1.75 m)	175 lb (79 kg)	1997-01-11	Warroad, Minnesota	Des Moines Buccaneers (USHL)	—
11	(United States)	Koby Bender	Junior	F	6' 1" (1.85 m)	200 lb (91 kg)	1997-07-15	Cloquet, Minnesota	Muskegon Lumberjacks (USHL)	—
12	(Canada)	Jarod Hilderman	Junior	D	6' 1" (1.85 m)	210 lb (95 kg)	1997-04-11	Kamsack, Saskatchewan	Fargo Force (USHL)	—
13	(Canada)	Tanner Laderoute	Sophomore	F	6' 0" (1.83 m)	190 lb (86 kg)	1997-06-04	Edmonton, Alberta	Okotoks Oilers (AJHL)	—
15	(Canada)	Quinn Olson	Freshman	F	5' 11" (1.8 m)	170 lb (77 kg)	2001-05-09	Calgary, Alberta	Okotoks Oilers (AJHL)	BOS, 92nd overall 2019
16	(United States)	Luke Loheit	Freshman	F	6' 1" (1.85 m)	195 lb (88 kg)	2000-07-26	Minnetonka, Minnesota	Penticton Vees (BCHL)	OTT, 194th overall 2018
17	(United States)	Cole Koepke	Sophomore	F	6' 1" (1.85 m)	195 lb (88 kg)	1998-05-17	Hermantown, Minnesota	Sioux City Musketeers (USHL)	TBL, 183rd overall 2018
18	(United States)	Jesse Jacques	Sophomore	F	6' 1" (1.85 m)	195 lb (88 kg)	1998-09-10	Hermantown, Minnesota	Green Bay Gamblers (USHL)	—
19	(United States)	Justin Richards	Junior	F	5' 11" (1.8 m)	190 lb (86 kg)	1998-03-17	Columbus, Ohio	Lincoln Stars (USHL)	—
20	(United States)	Jackson Cates	Sophomore	F	6' 0" (1.83 m)	190 lb (86 kg)	1997-09-28	Stillwater, Minnesota	Waterloo Black Hawks (USHL)	—
21	(United States)	Noah Cates	Sophomore	F	6' 2" (1.88 m)	190 lb (86 kg)	1999-02-05	Stillwater, Minnesota	Omaha Lancers (USHL)	PHI, 137th overall 2017
22	(United States)	Brandon Puricelli	Freshman	F	5' 10" (1.78 m)	185 lb (84 kg)	1998-02-04	Ellisville, Missouri	Springfield Jr. Blues (NAHL)	—
23	(United States)	Nick Swaney	Junior	F	5' 11" (1.8 m)	175 lb (79 kg)	1997-09-09	Lakeville, Minnesota	Waterloo Black Hawks (USHL)	MIN, 209th overall 2017
26	(United States)	Jade Miller	Senior	F	5' 10" (1.78 m)	190 lb (86 kg)	1995-07-01	Minto, North Dakota	Austin Bruins (NAHL)	—
27	(United States)	Jake Rosenbaum	Sophomore	D	6' 0" (1.83 m)	190 lb (86 kg)	1997-03-28	Trabuco Canyon, California	Minot Minotauros (NAHL)	—
28	(United States)	Brady Meyer	Freshman	F	6' 5" (1.96 m)	215 lb (98 kg)	2000-10-17	North Branch, Minnesota	Green Bay Gamblers (USHL)	—
32	(United States)	Hunter Shepard	Senior	G	6' 1" (1.85 m)	210 lb (95 kg)	1995-11-07	Cohasset, Minnesota	Bismarck Bobcats (NAHL)	—
36	(Canada)	Ben Patt	Sophomore (RS)	G	5' 11" (1.8 m)	180 lb (82 kg)	1996-05-19	Brampton, Ontario	Notre Dame Hounds (SJHL)	—
39	(Canada)	Ryan Fanti	Freshman	G	6' 3" (1.91 m)	195 lb (88 kg)	1999-10-03	Thunder Bay, Ontario	Minnesota Wilderness (NAHL)	—

== Standings ==
2019–20 National Collegiate Hockey Conference Standings
	Conference record								Overall record					
	GP	W	L	T	3/SW	PTS	GF	GA	GP	W	L	T	GF	GA
#3 North Dakota †	24	17	4	3	2	56	86	49	35	26	5	4	135	68
#5 Minnesota–Duluth	24	17	5	2	0	53	89	53	34	22	10	2	114	77
#6 Denver	24	11	8	5	4	42	67	54	36	21	9	6	118	81
#16 Western Michigan	24	12	9	3	2	41	84	73	36	18	13	5	125	101
St. Cloud State	24	10	12	2	1	33	61	74	34	13	15	6	94	108
Omaha	24	8	13	3	0	27	63	75	36	14	17	5	108	107
Miami	24	5	16	3	2	20	61	89	34	8	21	5	92	127
Colorado College	24	4	17	3	1	16	48	96	34	11	20	3	86	123
Championship: Cancelled † indicates conference regular season champion; * indicates conference tournament champion Rankings: USCHO.com Top 20 Poll

== Schedule and results ==
Date	Time	Opponent^{#}	Rank^{#}	Site	TV	Decision	Result	Attendance	Record
Exhibition
October 5	7:05 PM	vs. Alberta*	#1	AMSOIL Arena • Duluth, Minnesota (Exhibition)		Patt	L 3–5	4,883	
Regular season
October 11	7:12 PM	vs. Massachusetts–Lowell*	#1	AMSOIL Arena • Duluth, Minnesota	FSN	Shepard	L 2–3	6,041	0–1–0
October 12	7:07 PM	vs. Massachusetts–Lowell*	#1	AMSOIL Arena • Duluth, Minnesota	NESN+	Shepard	W 2–1	6,142	1–1–0
October 18	7:02 PM	at #17 Wisconsin*	#3	Kohl Center • Madison, Wisconsin	FSN+	Shepard	L 2–6	10,410	1–2–0
October 19	7:02 PM	at #17 Wisconsin*	#3	Kohl Center • Madison, Wisconsin	FSN+	Shepard	L 1–3	13,296	1–3–0
October 25	7:05 PM	at #20 Minnesota*	#8	3M Arena at Mariucci • Minneapolis, Minnesota	FSN+	Shepard	W 5–2	9,407	2–3–0
October 26	7:07 PM	vs. #20 Minnesota*	#8	AMSOIL Arena • Duluth, Minnesota		Shepard	W 2–0	6,655	3–3–0
November 8	7:07 PM	vs. #1 Denver	#7	AMSOIL Arena • Duluth, Minnesota		Shepard	T 3–3 ^{SOL}	5,374	3–3–1 (0–0–1–0)
November 9	7:07 PM	vs. #1 Denver	#7	AMSOIL Arena • Duluth, Minnesota		Shepard	W 5–2	5,874	4–3–1 (1–0–1–0)
November 15	6:05 PM	at Miami	#6	Steve Cady Arena • Oxford, Ohio		Shepard	L 1–3	2,416	4–4–1 (1–1–1–0)
November 16	7:05 PM	at Miami	#6	Steve Cady Arena • Oxford, Ohio		Shepard	W 3–2	2,879	5–4–1 (2–1–1–0)
November 22	7:07 PM	vs. Colorado College	#9	AMSOIL Arena • Duluth, Minnesota		Shepard	W 4–3	5,574	6–4–1 (3–1–1–0)
November 23	7:07 PM	vs. Colorado College	#9	AMSOIL Arena • Duluth, Minnesota		Shepard	W 5–0	5,781	7–4–1 (4–1–1–0)
November 29	7:07 PM	vs. #1 Minnesota State*	#8	AMSOIL Arena • Duluth, Minnesota		Shepard	L 1–4	5,494	7–5–1 (4–1–1–0)
November 30	7:07 PM	vs. #1 Minnesota State*	#8	AMSOIL Arena • Duluth, Minnesota		Shepard	L 1–3	5,103	7–6–1 (4–1–1–0)
December 6	7:07 PM	at #18 Omaha	#14	Baxter Arena • Omaha, Nebraska		Shepard	W 6–3	5,299	8–6–1 (5–1–1–0)
December 7	7:07 PM	at #18 Omaha	#14	Baxter Arena • Omaha, Nebraska		Shepard	W 4–3	5,312	9–6–1 (6–1–1–0)
December 29	4:05 PM	at Merrimack*	#10	J. Thom Lawler Rink • North Andover, Massachusetts		Shepard	W 4–1	1,903	10–6–1 (6–1–1–0)
December 30	4:05 PM	at Merrimack*	#10	J. Thom Lawler Rink • North Andover, Massachusetts		Shepard	W 5–1	1,707	11–6–1 (6–1–1–0)
January 10	7:07 PM	vs. Western Michigan	#9	AMSOIL Arena • Duluth, Minnesota	FSN	Shepard	W 6–3	5,864	12–6–1 (7–1–1–0)
January 11	7:07 PM	vs. Western Michigan	#9	AMSOIL Arena • Duluth, Minnesota		Shepard	T 3–3 ^{SOL}	6,012	12–6–2 (7–1–2–0)
January 17	7:37 PM	at St. Cloud State	#8	Herb Brooks National Hockey Center • St. Cloud, Minnesota		Shepard	L 1–2	4,166	12–7–2 (7–2–2–0)
January 18	4:07 PM	at St. Cloud State	#8	Herb Brooks National Hockey Center • St. Cloud, Minnesota	FSN+	Shepard	L 0–2	5,199	12–8–2 (7–3–2–0)
January 24	7:07 PM	vs. #2 North Dakota	#11	AMSOIL Arena • Duluth, Minnesota	CBSSN	Shepard	W 7–4	7,016	13–8–2 (8–3–2–0)
January 25	7:07 PM	vs. #2 North Dakota	#11	AMSOIL Arena • Duluth, Minnesota		Shepard	L 2–3	7,711	13–9–2 (8–4–2–0)
January 31	8:07 PM	at #4 Denver	#10	Magness Arena • Denver, Colorado	Altitude2	Shepard	W 3–2	6,477	14–9–2 (9–4–2–0)
February 1	7:07 PM	at #4 Denver	#10	Magness Arena • Denver, Colorado	Altitude2	Shepard	W 4–1	6,181	15–9–2 (10–4–2–0)
February 7	7:07 PM	vs. Omaha	#6	AMSOIL Arena • Duluth, Minnesota		Shepard	W 3–2	6,194	16–9–2 (11–4–2–0)
February 8	7:07 PM	vs. Omaha	#6	AMSOIL Arena • Duluth, Minnesota		Shepard	W 4–1	6,642	17–9–2 (12–4–2–0)
February 21	6:00 PM	at #19 Western Michigan	#4	Lawson Arena • Kalamazoo, Michigan	CBSSN	Shepard	L 3–5	3,200	17–10–2 (12–5–2–0)
February 22	6:05 PM	at #19 Western Michigan	#4	Lawson Arena • Kalamazoo, Michigan		Shepard	W 2–1	3,667	18–10–2 (13–5–2–0)
February 28	8:37 PM	at Colorado College	#5	Broadmoor World Arena • Colorado Springs, Colorado		Shepard	W 4–2	2,883	19–10–2 (14–5–2–0)
February 29	7:07 PM	at Colorado College	#5	Broadmoor World Arena • Colorado Springs, Colorado	ATTRM	Shepard	W 6–1	3,043	20–10–2 (15–5–2–0)
March 6	7:07 PM	vs. St. Cloud State	#5	AMSOIL Arena • Duluth, Minnesota	FSN+	Shepard	W 4–1	6,024	21–10–2 (16–5–2–0)
March 7	7:07 PM	vs. St. Cloud State	#5	AMSOIL Arena • Duluth, Minnesota		Shepard	W 6–1	6,579	22–10–2 (17–5–2–0)
NCHC Tournament
Tournament Cancelled
*Non-conference game. ^{#}Rankings from USCHO.com Poll. All times are in Central Time.

== Scoring Statistics ==
Name	Position	Games	Goals	Assists	Points	PIM
Scott Perunovich	D	34	6	34	40	64
Cole Koepke	LW	34	16	17	33	16
Noah Cates	LW	34	14	19	33	35
Nick Swaney	RW	31	12	14	26	4
Justin Richards	C	34	14	11	25	14
Jackson Cates	C	29	8	15	23	6
Kobe Roth	F	34	13	8	21	0
Dylan Samberg	D	28	1	20	21	18
Tanner Laderoute	F	31	8	8	16	40
Quinn Olson	LW	31	7	8	15	24
Nick Wolff	D	33	0	10	10	42
Jade Miller	F	34	2	7	9	6
Koby Bender	F	32	5	3	8	16
Luke Loheit	RW	33	5	1	6	8
Louie Roehl	D	34	2	3	5	24
Jesse Jacques	F	29	0	3	3	21
Jarod Hilderman	D	32	0	3	3	14
Brandon Puricelli	RW	12	1	1	2	4
Matt Anderson	D	34	0	1	1	17
Hunter Lellig	D	4	0	1	1	17
Ben Almquist	F	14	0	1	1	4
Hunter Shepard	G	34	0	1	1	2
Brady Meyer	C	7	0	0	0	2
Jake Rosenbaum	D	27	0	0	0	0
Bench	-	-	-	-	-	10
Total			114	190	304	405

== Goaltending statistics ==
Name	Games	Minutes	Wins	Losses	Ties	Goals against	Saves	Shut outs	SV %	GAA
Hunter Shepard	34	2032	22	10	2	74	826	2	.918	2.18
Empty Net	-	17	-	-	-	3	-	-	-	-
Total	34	2050	22	10	2	77	826	2	.915	2.25

== Rankings ==
Poll	Week																							
Poll	Pre	1	2	3	4	5	6	7	8	9	10	11	12	13	14	15	16	17	18	19	20	21	22	23 (Final)
USCHO.com	1	1	3	8	6	7	6	9	8	14	11	10	10	9	8	11	10	6	4	4	5	5	4	5
USA Today	1	1	2	8	6	7	6	10	9	14	11	11	10	9	8	11	10	7	4	4	5	5	5	5

== Players drafted into the NHL ==
=== 2020 NHL entry draft ===
Round	Pick	Player	NHL team
3	81	Wyatt Kaiser†	Chicago Blackhawks
4	102	Jack Smith†	Montreal Canadiens
4	109	Blake Biondi†	Montreal Canadiens

† incoming freshman
