= 2020 NCHC Tournament =

2020 NCHC Men's ice hockey tournament
- Dates: March 13–21, 2020
- Teams: 8
- Finals site: Xcel Energy Center; Saint Paul, Minnesota
- NCHC Men's Ice Hockey Tournaments

The 2020 NCHC Tournament was scheduled to be the seventh tournament in league history. It was scheduled to be played between March 13 and 21, 2020. Quarterfinal games were to be played at home team campus sites, while the final four games were to be played at the Xcel Energy Center in Saint Paul, Minnesota. On March 12, 2020, NCHC announced that the remainder of the tournament was cancelled due to the coronavirus pandemic, before any games were played.

== Format ==
The first round of the postseason tournament featured a best-of-three games format. All eight conference teams participate in the tournament. Teams are seeded No. 1 through No. 8 according to their final conference standing, with a tiebreaker system used to seed teams with an identical number of points accumulated. The top four seeded teams each earn home ice and host one of the lower seeded teams.

The winners of the first round series advanced to the Xcel Energy Center for the NCHC Frozen Faceoff. The Frozen Faceoff uses a single-elimination format. Teams are re-seeded No. 1 through No. 4 according to the final regular season conference standings.

=== Standings ===
2019–20 National Collegiate Hockey Conference Standings
	Conference record								Overall record					
	GP	W	L	T	3/SW	PTS	GF	GA	GP	W	L	T	GF	GA
#3 North Dakota †	24	17	4	3	2	56	86	49	35	26	5	4	135	68
#5 Minnesota–Duluth	24	17	5	2	0	53	89	53	34	22	10	2	114	77
#6 Denver	24	11	8	5	4	42	67	54	36	21	9	6	118	81
#16 Western Michigan	24	12	9	3	2	41	84	73	36	18	13	5	125	101
St. Cloud State	24	10	12	2	1	33	61	74	34	13	15	6	94	108
Omaha	24	8	13	3	0	27	63	75	36	14	17	5	108	107
Miami	24	5	16	3	2	20	61	89	34	8	21	5	92	127
Colorado College	24	4	17	3	1	16	48	96	34	11	20	3	86	123
Championship: Cancelled † indicates conference regular season champion; * indicates conference tournament champion Rankings: USCHO.com Top 20 Poll

== Bracket ==
Teams are reseeded for the Semifinals

Quarterfinals; March 13–15
1	North Dakota
8	Colorado College
2	Western Michigan
7	St. Cloud State
(Pairings are reseeded after the first round)
3	Denver
6	Omaha
4	Minnesota–Duluth
5	Miami

Semifinals; March 20

Championship; March 21
Third Place

* denotes overtime periods
