= Kelly Lake, Hibbing, Minnesota =

Neighborhood of Hibbing, Minnesota, United States

Coordinates: 47°25′03″N 93°00′24″W

Kelly Lake is a neighborhood of the city of Hibbing in St. Louis County, Minnesota, United States. County Road 60 / Rainey Road / 1st Avenue serves as a main arterial route in the community. Previously, Kelly Lake was its own unincorporated community before it was annexed by the city of Hibbing. U.S. Route 169 is nearby.
