= Goggin Ice Center =

Sports facility in Oxford, Ohio

Coordinates: 39°30′13″N 84°44′13″W

- "Goggin"
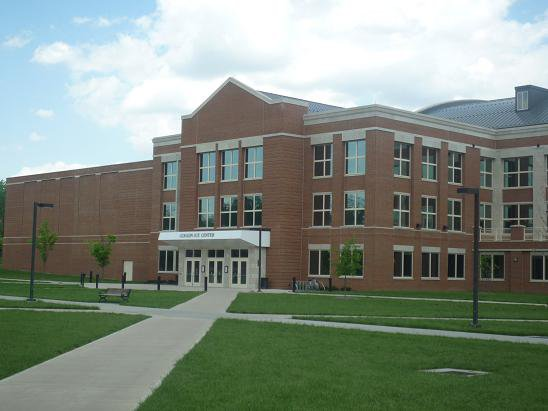
- Interactive map of Goggin Ice Center
- Location: 610 S Oak St; Oxford, OH 45056
- Owner: Miami University
- Capacity: 3,642
- Surface: 200' x 85' (hockey)
- Record attendance: Ice Hockey: 3,642; November 21st, 2025; Miami Redhawks vs. St. Cloud State Huskies
- Parking: 600 spaces

Construction
- Opened: July 15, 2006
- Cost: $34.8 million ($55.6 million in 2025 dollars)

Tenants
- Miami University Ice Hockey (NCAA) (2006-present); Miami Women's Ice Hockey (ACHA National Champions 2014); Miami University Synchronized Skating (2006-present); Miami Jr. Redhawks (Youth Hockey) (2008-present)

Goggin Ice Center (The Goggin) is a multi-purpose sports facility in Oxford, Ohio on the Miami University campus. It replaced the Goggin Ice Arena. Like its predecessor, it is named for Lloyd Goggin, former school vice president who was instrumental in building the original ice arena.

The Goggin features two ice rinks. The "A Pad," used for main events, is known as Steve Cady Arena, and is home to the RedHawks hockey team and synchronized skating team. The "B Pad" is used for recreational skating. The building also hosts intramural hockey and broomball programs, Jr. RedHawks youth and Talawanda High School varsity hockey clubs, hockey camps, skating lessons, ice shows and other events.

== History ==
From 1976 to 2006, Miami University’s ice home was the Goggin Ice Arena. In 2002, university president James Garland made the executive decision that the new arena would be located across campus from the old “Goggin”. Steve Cady, the founding coach of the hockey program and by then a senior athletic director, was put in charge of the new ice arena project. The new building could not have been completed without the generous donations from Tom Brown, a former Miami goaltender, now CEO of Second Curve Capital in New York City.

== Steve Cady Arena ==
Steve Cady Arena, the “A Pad” ice rink inside Goggin Ice Center, includes 2,800 general seats, 102 club-level seats, 4 opera suites and 6 private boxes as well as a large dining area. Including standing-room-only seats, the arena can hold up to nearly 4,000.

The club seating area and press box has seating for 18, with room for two 4-person radio booths.

The arena also includes locker rooms for varsity hockey and synchronized skating, as well as 13 other locker areas for intramural sports and recreational sports.

== Architecture ==
The arena was designed through collaborative efforts by 360 Architecture and GBBN Architecture. After 104 weeks of work and over 41,000 man-hours, the project was completed. It was the most labor-intensive project in university history. The project also called for a 500-car parking garage, adjacent to the university.

== Intramural sports ==
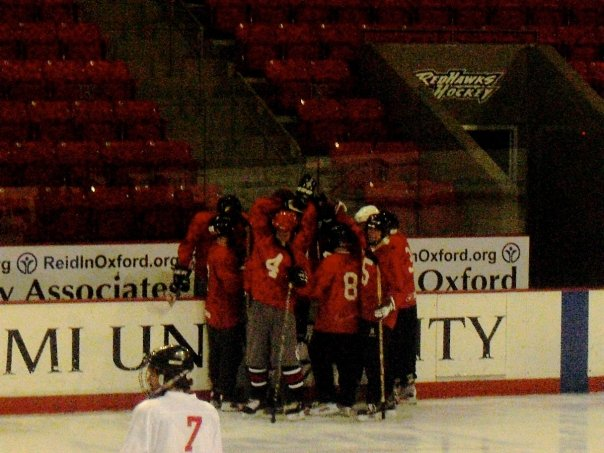
Intramural hockey

The Goggin Ice Center is also home to the university's intramural hockey and broomball programs. The Goggin offers “Beginner”, “Intermediate”, “Advanced”, and “Elite” leagues in intramural ice hockey for fall, winter, and spring seasons, as well as men’s, women’s, and co-ed broomball leagues for each season. More than 500 teams, consisting of more than 8,000 students sign up each season.

== Events hosted ==
In March 2013 Goggin Ice Center hosted the USA Broomball National Championships. Over 20 teams competed in 7 Divisions. The host team Miami University won the collegiate division. The A men's division was won by Furious (Minneapolis, MN) over Barrie's Tavern (Syracuse, NY) 3-2 in double overtime.
