= 2024–25 North Dakota Fighting Hawks men's ice hockey season =

- Conference: NCHC
- Home ice: Ralph Engelstad Arena

Rankings
- USCHO: #18
- USA Hockey: #18

Record
- Overall: 21–15–2
- Conference: 14–9–1
- Home: 10–7–1
- Road: 11–7–1
- Neutral: 0–1–0

Coaches and captains
- Head coach: Brad Berry
- Assistant coaches: Dane Jackson; Karl Goehring; Dillon Simpson
- Captain: Louis Jamernik V
- Alternate captain(s): Cameron Berg; Jackson Kunz; Dane Montgomery; Jake Schmaltz; Bennett Zmolek

The 2024–25 North Dakota Fighting Hawks men's ice hockey season was the 85th season of play for the program and 12th in the NCHC. The Fighting Hawks represented the University of North Dakota in the 2024–25 NCAA Division I men's ice hockey season, played their home games at Ralph Engelstad Arena and were coached by Brad Berry in his 10th and final season.

== Season ==
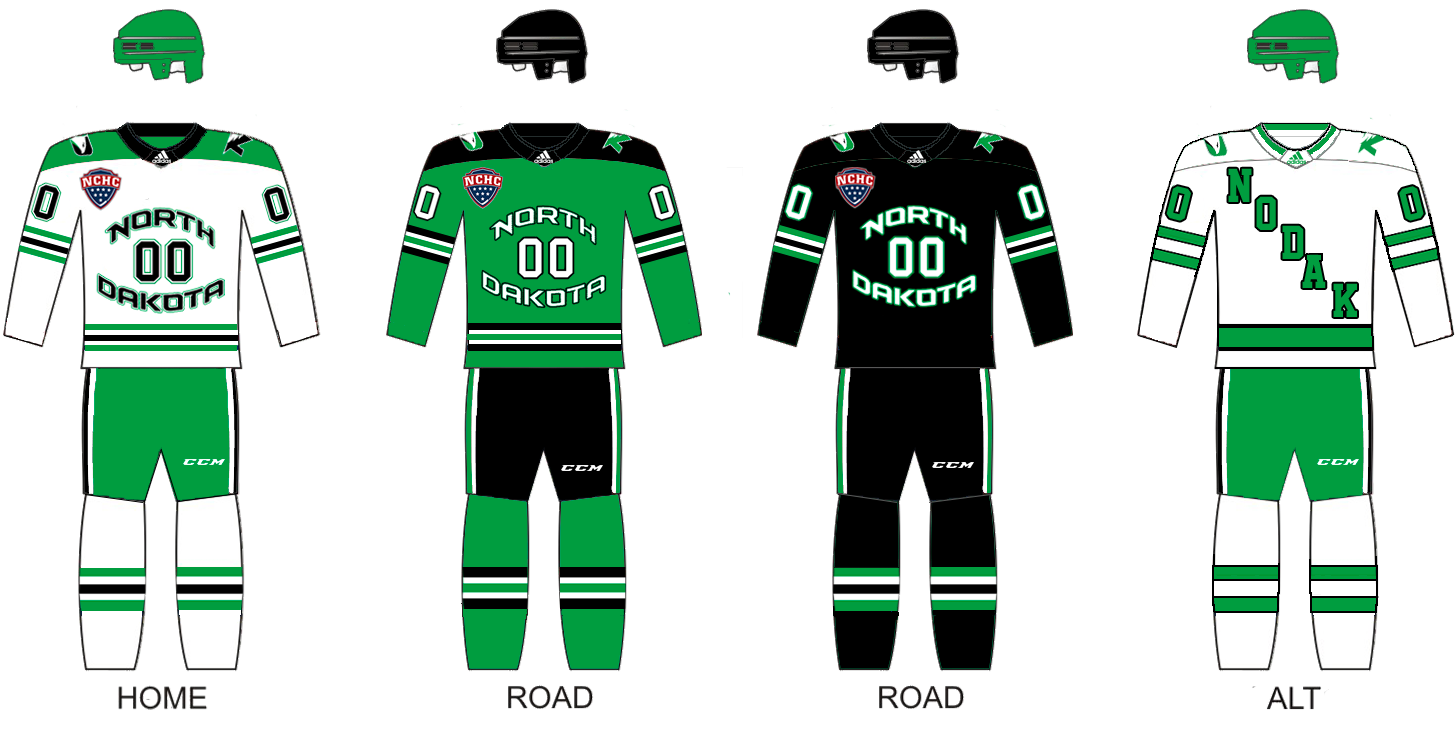
2024-25 Season Uniforms

== Departures ==
Player	Position	Nationality	Cause
Carson Albrecht	Forward	Canada	Graduation (retired)
Nate Benoit	Defense	United States	Transferred to Quinnipiac
Jackson Blake	Forward	United States	Signed professional contract (Carolina Hurricanes)
Logan Britt	Defense	United States	Graduation (signed with Greenville Swamp Rabbits)
Michael Emerson	Forward	United States	Returned to juniors mid-2023–24 season (Chicago Steel; later transferred to Merrimack)
Riese Gaber	Forward	Canada	Graduation (signed with Charlotte Checkers)
Hunter Johannes	Forward	United States	Graduation (signed with Grand Rapids Griffins)
Griffin Ness	Forward	United States	Graduation (signed with Maine Mariners)
Keaton Pehrson	Defense	United States	Graduation (signed with Charlotte Checkers)
Ludvig Persson	Goaltender	Sweden	Graduation (signed with Brynäs IF)
Garrett Pyke	Defense	Canada	Graduation (signed with Colorado Eagles)

== Recruiting ==
Player	Position	Nationality	Age	Notes
Dalton Andrew	Forward	Canada	21	Brandon, MB
Sacha Boisvert	Forward	Canada	18	Trois-Rivières, QC; selected 18th overall in 2024
Cody Croal	Forward	United States	21	North Branch, MN
EJ Emery	Defense	United States	18	Compton, CA; selected 30th overall in 2024
Aleksi Huson	Goaltender	United States	18	Shakopee, MN; joined team mid-season from UND's ACHA team after an injury to Kaleb Johnson
Jayden Jubenville	Defense	Canada	21	Gilbert Plains, MB
Cade Littler	Forward	United States	20	East Wenatchee, WA
Caleb MacDonald	Defense	Canada	21	Cambridge, ON; transfer from Alaska
T.J. Semptimphelter	Goaltender	United States	22	Marlton, NJ; transfer from Arizona State
Andrew Strathmann	Defense	United States	19	Beach Park, IL
Mac Swanson	Forward	United States	18	Anchorage, AK; selected 207th overall in 2024
Carter Wilkie	Forward	Canada	24	Calgary, AB; transfer from RIT

== Roster ==
As of January 6, 2025.

No.	Nat.	Player	Class	Pos	Height	Weight	DoB	Hometown	Previous team	NHL rights
1	(United States)	Kaleb Johnson	Junior	G	6' 0" (1.83 m)	180 lb (82 kg)	2001-01-07	Grand Forks, North Dakota	Minnesota Wilderness (NAHL)	—
2	(United States)	Bennett Zmolek (A)	Junior (RS)	D	6' 2" (1.88 m)	200 lb (91 kg)	2002-04-17	Rochester, Minnesota	Minnesota State (CCHA)	—
3	(Canada)	Jayden Jubenvill	Freshman	D	6' 0" (1.83 m)	182 lb (83 kg)	2003-06-19	Gilbert Plains, Manitoba	Dubuque (USHL)	—
4	(United States)	Jake Livanavage	Sophomore	D	5' 10" (1.78 m)	185 lb (84 kg)	2004-05-06	Phoenix, Arizona	Chicago (USHL)	—
5	(United States)	Dane Montgomery (A)	Junior (RS)	F/D	5' 10" (1.78 m)	175 lb (79 kg)	2002-01-07	Grand Forks, North Dakota	Waterloo (USHL)	—
6	(United States)	EJ Emery	Freshman	D	6' 3" (1.91 m)	172 lb (78 kg)	2006-03-30	Compton, California	USNTDP (USHL)	NYR, 30th overall 2024
7	(United States)	Mac Swanson	Freshman	F	5' 8" (1.73 m)	175 lb (79 kg)	2006-01-10	Anchorage, Alaska	Fargo (USHL)	PIT, 207th overall 2024
8	(United States)	Jake Schmaltz (A)	Senior	F	6' 2" (1.88 m)	190 lb (86 kg)	2001-04-24	McFarland, Wisconsin	Green Bay (USHL)	BOS, 192nd overall 2019
9	(Canada)	Sacha Boisvert	Freshman	F	6' 2" (1.88 m)	176 lb (80 kg)	2006-05-17	Trois-Rivières, Québec	Muskegon (USHL)	CHI, 18th overall 2024
10	(Canada)	Tanner Komzak	Sophomore	D	6' 4" (1.93 m)	210 lb (95 kg)	2002-06-30	West Kelowna, British Columbia	Whitecourt (AJHL)	—
13	(Canada)	Caleb MacDonald	Sophomore	D	6' 3" (1.91 m)	224 lb (102 kg)	2002-11-29	Cambridge, Ontario	Alaska (NCAA)	—
14	(United States)	Cameron Berg (A)	Senior	F	6' 0" (1.83 m)	205 lb (93 kg)	2002-01-29	West Fargo, North Dakota	Omaha (NCHC)	NYI, 125th overall 2021
15	(Canada)	Carter Wilkie	Senior	F	6' 2" (1.88 m)	203 lb (92 kg)	2000-04-03	Calgary, Alberta	RIT (AHA)	—
16	(United States)	Andrew Strathmann	Freshman	D	5' 11" (1.8 m)	190 lb (86 kg)	2005-02-27	Beach Park, Illinois	Youngstown (USHL)	CBJ, 98th overall 2023
18	(Canada)	Jayden Perron	Sophomore	F	5' 9" (1.75 m)	175 lb (79 kg)	2005-01-11	Winnipeg, Manitoba	Chicago (USHL)	CAR, 94th overall 2023
19	(United States)	Cody Croal	Freshman	F	5' 11" (1.8 m)	176 lb (80 kg)	2003-06-17	North Branch, Minnesota	Muskegon (USHL)	—
20	(United States)	Cade Littler	Freshman	F	6' 3" (1.91 m)	216 lb (98 kg)	2004-07-12	East Wenatchee, Washington	Penticton (BCHL)	CGY, 219th overall 2022
21	(United States)	Ben Strinden	Junior	F	6' 1" (1.85 m)	200 lb (91 kg)	2002-06-04	Fargo, North Dakota	Muskegon (USHL)	NSH, 210th overall 2022
22	(United States)	Owen McLaughlin	Junior	F	6' 0" (1.83 m)	178 lb (81 kg)	2003-03-25	Spring City, Pennsylvania	Sioux City (USHL)	PHI, 206th overall 2021
25	(Canada)	Abram Wiebe	Sophomore	D	6' 3" (1.91 m)	206 lb (93 kg)	2003-08-28	Mission, British Columbia	Chilliwack (BCHL)	VGK, 209th overall 2022
26	(Canada)	Dylan James	Junior	F	6' 0" (1.83 m)	185 lb (84 kg)	2003-10-12	Calgary, Alberta	Sioux City (USHL)	DET, 40th overall 2022
27	(Canada)	Louis Jamernik V (C)	Fifth Year	F	5' 11" (1.8 m)	205 lb (93 kg)	2000-02-22	Calgary, Alberta	Okotoks (AJHL)	—
28	(Canada)	Dalton Andrew	Freshman	F	6' 4" (1.93 m)	205 lb (93 kg)	2003-08-05	Brandon, Manitoba	Winkler (MJHL)	—
29	(United States)	Jackson Kunz (A)	Senior	F	6' 3" (1.91 m)	232 lb (105 kg)	2002-08-13	Grand Forks, North Dakota	Green Bay (USHL)	VAN, 113th overall 2020
30	(United States)	Hobie Hedquist	Sophomore	G	6' 2" (1.88 m)	192 lb (87 kg)	2003-02-14	Heron Lake, Minnesota	Alberni Valley (BCHL)	—
33	(United States)	Aleksi Huson	Freshman	G	6' 2" (1.88 m)	170 lb (77 kg)	2006-07-15	Shakopee, Minnesota	Shakopee (MSHSL)	—
35	(United States)	T.J. Semptimphelter	Graduate	G	6' 1" (1.85 m)	193 lb (88 kg)	2002-05-09	Marlton, New Jersey	Arizona State (NCAA)	—

1.Dane Montgomery was named an assistant captain on January 4, 2025 following news that Bennett Zmolek's injury sustained versus Providence on October 12, 2024 would be season-ending.

== Standings ==
2024–25 National Collegiate Hockey Conference Standings
	Conference record										Overall record					
	GP	W	L	T	OTW	OTL	SW	PTS	GF	GA	GP	W	L	T	GF	GA
#1 Western Michigan †*	24	19	4	1	4	3	0	57	98	51	42	34	7	1	167	86
#16 Arizona State	24	14	9	1	2	5	1	47	91	69	37	21	14	2	136	103
#3 Denver	24	15	8	1	2	1	0	45	89	59	44	31	12	1	174	94
Omaha	24	14	9	1	1	1	1	44	82	69	36	18	17	1	105	99
#18 North Dakota	24	14	9	1	3	1	1	42	81	73	38	21	15	2	120	111
Colorado College	24	11	12	1	4	1	1	32	68	72	37	18	18	1	106	113
Minnesota Duluth	24	9	13	2	2	2	1	30	63	77	36	13	20	3	99	117
St. Cloud State	24	7	16	1	2	3	0	23	53	79	36	14	21	1	79	110
Miami	24	0	23	1	0	3	0	4	38	114	34	3	28	3	63	143
Championship: March 22, 2025 † indicates conference regular season champion (Penrose Cup) * indicates conference tournament champion (Frozen Faceoff Championship Trophy); Rankings: USCHO.com Top 20 Poll

== Schedule and results ==
Date	Time	Opponent^{#}	Rank^{#}	Site	TV	Decision	Result	Attendance	Record
Exhibition
October 5	6:07 pm	Augustana*	#5	Ralph Engelstad Arena • Grand Forks, North Dakota (Exhibition)	Midco Sports	Semptimphelter	L 1–4	11,667	—
Regular Season
October 12	6:07 pm	#13 Providence*	#6	Ralph Engelstad Arena • Grand Forks, North Dakota (US Hockey Hall of Fame Game)	Midco Sports	Semptimphelter	W 5–2	11,703	1–0–0
October 18	7:07 pm	at #20 Minnesota State*	#5	Mayo Clinic Health System Event Center • Mankato, Minnesota	Midco Sports Plus	Semptimphelter	W 3–2	4,912	2–0–0
October 19	6:07 pm	at #20 Minnesota State*	#5	Mayo Clinic Health System Event Center • Mankato, Minnesota	Midco Sports Plus	Hedquist	L 0–3	5,042	2–1–0
October 25	7:07 pm	#3 Boston University*	#7	Ralph Engelstad Arena • Grand Forks, North Dakota	Midco Sports	Semptimphelter	W 7–2	11,696	3–1–0
October 26	6:07 pm	#3 Boston University*	#7	Ralph Engelstad Arena • Grand Forks, North Dakota	Midco Sports	Semptimphelter	L 3–4	11,736	3–2–0
November 1	6:00 pm	at #9 Cornell*	#6	Lynah Rink • Ithaca, New York	ESPN+	Semptimphelter	L 1–4	4,267	3–3–0
November 2	6:00 pm	at #9 Cornell*	#6	Lynah Rink • Ithaca, New York	ESPN+	Hedquist	L 3–5	4,091	3–4–0
November 8	7:07 pm	at Minnesota Duluth	#10	AMSOIL Arena • Duluth, Minnesota	NCHC.tv	Semptimphelter	W 7–3	6,120	4–4–0 (1–0–0)
November 9	6:07 pm	at Minnesota Duluth	#10	AMSOIL Arena • Duluth, Minnesota	Midco Sports Two	Semptimphelter	W 4–1	6,520	5–4–0 (2–0–0)
November 15	7:07 pm	#1 Denver	#9	Ralph Engelstad Arena • Grand Forks, North Dakota (Rivalry)	Midco Sports	Semptimphelter	L 2–5	11,597	5–5–0 (2–1–0)
November 16	6:07 pm	#1 Denver	#9	Ralph Engelstad Arena • Grand Forks, North Dakota (Rivalry)	Midco Sports	Semptimphelter	L 2–3	11,633	5–6–0 (2–2–0)
November 22	7:07 pm	Robert Morris*	#12	Ralph Engelstad Arena • Grand Forks, North Dakota	Midco Sports	Semptimphelter	W 4–3 ^{OT}	11,576	6–6–0
November 23	6:07 pm	Robert Morris*	#12	Ralph Engelstad Arena • Grand Forks, North Dakota	Midco Sports	Hedquist	W 1–0	11,573	7–6–0
November 29	7:07 pm	at Bemidji State*	#14	Sanford Center • Bemidji, Minnesota	Midco Sports Plus	Semptimphelter	L 1–2	4,373	7–7–0
November 30	6:07 pm	Bemidji State*	#14	Ralph Engelstad Arena • Grand Forks, North Dakota	Midco Sports	Hedquist	T 3–3 ^{SOW}	11,587	7–7–1
December 6	6:05 pm	at Miami	#16	Steve Cady Arena • Oxford, Ohio	NCHC.tv	Semptimphelter	W 5–4	1,773	8–7–1 (3–2–0)
December 7	6:05 pm	at Miami	#16	Steve Cady Arena • Oxford, Ohio	NCHC.tv	Semptimphelter	W 4–2	2,046	9–7–1 (4–2–0)
December 13	7:07 pm	#9 St. Cloud State	#16	Ralph Engelstad Arena • Grand Forks, North Dakota	Midco Sports	Semptimphelter	W 2–0	11,455	10–7–1 (5–2–0)
December 14	6:07 pm	#9 St. Cloud State	#16	Ralph Engelstad Arena • Grand Forks, North Dakota	Midco Sports	Semptimphelter	W 4–3 ^{OT}	11,588	11–7–1 (6–2–0)
Exhibition
January 4	6:07 pm	Manitoba*	#14	Ralph Engelstad Arena • Grand Forks, North Dakota (Exhibition)	Midco Sports	Hedquist	W 5–0	11,571	—
Regular Season
January 10	9:06 pm	at #16 Arizona State	#14	Mullett Arena • Tempe, Arizona	CBSSN	Semptimphelter	L 1–4	5,174	11–8–1 (6–3–0)
January 11	6:00 pm	at #16 Arizona State	#14	Mullett Arena • Tempe, Arizona	Fox 10 Xtra	Hedquist	W 4–3 ^{OT}	5,205	12–8–1 (7–3–0)
January 17	7:07 pm	#4 Western Michigan	#14	Ralph Engelstad Arena • Grand Forks, North Dakota	Midco Sports	Hedquist	L 2–3 ^{OT}	11,603	12–9–1 (7–4–0)
January 18	6:07 pm	#4 Western Michigan	#14	Ralph Engelstad Arena • Grand Forks, North Dakota	Midco Sports	Semptimphelter	L 1–5	11,659	12–10–1 (7–5–0)
January 31	7:30 pm	at St. Cloud State	#16	Herb Brooks National Hockey Center • St. Cloud, Minnesota	Fox 9+	Semptimphelter	T 3–3 ^{SOW}	4,106	12–10–2 (7–5–1)
February 1	6:00 pm	at St. Cloud State	#16	Herb Brooks National Hockey Center • St. Cloud, Minnesota	Fox 9+	Hedquist	W 6–2	5,124	13–10–2 (8–5–1)
February 7	7:07 pm	#20 Colorado College	#16	Ralph Engelstad Arena • Grand Forks, North Dakota	Midco Sports	Hedquist	L 4–6	11,572	13–11–2 (8–6–1)
February 8	6:07 pm	#20 Colorado College	#16	Ralph Engelstad Arena • Grand Forks, North Dakota	Midco Sports	Semptimphelter	W 3–1	11,640	14–11–2 (9–6–1)
February 14	8:00 pm	at #6 Denver	#17	Magness Arena • Denver, Colorado (Rivalry)	CBSSN	Semptimphelter	L 0–4	6,344	14–12–2 (9–7–1)
February 15	7:00 pm	at #6 Denver	#17	Magness Arena • Denver, Colorado (Rivalry)	Altitude	Semptimphelter	W 3–1	6,740	15–12–2 (10–7–1)
February 21	7:07 pm	Minnesota Duluth	#17	Ralph Engelstad Arena • Grand Forks, North Dakota	Midco Sports	Semptimphelter	W 4–2	11,602	16–12–2 (11–7–1)
February 22	6:07 pm	Minnesota Duluth	#17	Ralph Engelstad Arena • Grand Forks, North Dakota	Midco Sports	Semptimphelter	W 6–1	11,640	17–12–2 (12–7–1)
February 28	6:00 pm	at #4 Western Michigan	#18	Lawson Arena • Kalamazoo, Michigan	NCHC.tv	Semptimphelter	L 4–6	3,500	17–13–2 (12–8–1)
March 1	5:00 pm	at #4 Western Michigan	#18	Lawson Arena • Kalamazoo, Michigan	NCHC.tv	Semptimphelter	W 4–3 ^{OT}	3,623	18–13–2 (13–8–1)
March 7	6:36 pm	Omaha	#18	Ralph Engelstad Arena • Grand Forks, North Dakota	CBSSN	Semptimphelter	W 3–1	11,572	19–13–2 (14–8–1)
March 8	6:07 pm	Omaha	#18	Ralph Engelstad Arena • Grand Forks, North Dakota	Midco Sports	Semptimphelter	L 3–7	11,611	19–14–2 (14–9–1)
NCHC Tournament
March 14	7:00 pm	at #20 Omaha*	#17	Baxter Arena • Omaha, Nebraska (Quarterfinal Game 1)	Midco Sports	Semptimphelter	W 3–2	6,068	20–14–2
March 15	7:00 pm	at #20 Omaha*	#17	Baxter Arena • Omaha, Nebraska (Quarterfinal Game 2)	Midco Sports	Semptimphelter	W 3–2	6,378	21–14–2
March 21	7:30 pm	vs. #3 Western Michigan*	#17	Xcel Energy Center • St. Paul, Minnesota (Semifinal)	CBSSN	Semptimphelter	L 2–4	7,532	21–15–2
*Non-conference game. ^{#}Rankings from USCHO.com Poll. All times are in Central Time. Source:

== Scoring statistics ==
Name	Position	Games	Goals	Assists	Points	PIM
Sacha Boisvert	F	37	18	14	32	20
Owen McLaughlin	F	38	5	25	30	6
Jake Livanavage	D	38	4	24	28	12
Abram Wiebe	D	38	4	20	24	24
Dylan James	F	38	14	8	22	20
Cameron Berg	F	26	12	10	22	16
Jayden Perron	F	31	10	9	19	7
Carter Wilkie	F	38	9	9	18	42
Mac Swanson	F	38	2	16	18	2
Ben Strinden	F	38	8	8	16	14
Jake Schmaltz	F	38	6	10	16	26
Jackson Kunz	F	36	7	8	15	21
Louis Jamernik V	F	30	4	6	10	29
Caleb MacDonald	D	35	3	7	10	42
Cade Littler	F	33	7	2	9	21
Dane Montgomery	F/D	27	1	6	7	8
Jayden Jubenvill	D	37	2	4	6	29
Cody Croal	F	22	1	5	6	12
Andrew Strathmann	D	30	2	2	4	24
Dalton Andrew	F	15	1	0	1	8
EJ Emery	D	31	0	1	1	40
Bennett Zmolek	D	1	0	1	1	0
Hobie Hedquist	G	10	0	0	0	0
Tanner Komzak	D	17	0	0	0	4
T.J. Semptimphelter	G	31	0	0	0	16
Total			120	195	315	451

== Goaltending statistics ==
Name	Games	Minutes	Wins	Losses	Ties	Goals against	Saves	Shut outs	SV %	GAA
T.J. Semptimphelter	31	1752:34	18	11	2	77	777	1	.910	2.64
Hobie Hedquist	10	513:39	3	4	0	24	203	1	.894	2.80
Empty Net	–	34:28	–	–	–	10	–	–	–	–
Total	38	2300:41	21	15	2	111	980	2	.898	2.89

== Rankings ==
Poll	Week																											
Poll	Pre	1	2	3	4	5	6	7	8	9	10	11	12	13	14	15	16	17	18	19	20	21	22	23	24	25	26	27 (Final)
USCHO.com	5	6	5	7	6	10	9	12	14	16	16	15	–	14	14	14	16	16	16	17	17	18	18	17	17	18	–	18
USA Hockey	6	6	5	7	7	10	10	14	15	17	18	15	–	15	17	16	16	17	16	17	18	18	18	18	17	19	18	18

Note: USCHO did not release a poll in weeks 12 and 26.
Note: USA Hockey did not release a poll in week 12.

== Awards and honors ==
Player	Award	Ref
Cameron Berg	NCHC Preseason All-Conference Team	
Jake Livanavage	NCHC Preseason All-Conference Team	
Sacha Boisvert	NCHC Rookie of the Year	
Jake Livanavage	AHCA West Second Team All-American	

== 2025 NHL entry draft ==
Round	Pick	Player	NHL team
1	18	Cole Reschny ^{†}	Calgary Flames
3	79	Cooper Simpson ^{†}	Boston Bruins
5	138	Sam Laurila ^{†}	New York Islanders
6	167	Ashton Schultz ^{†}	Buffalo Sabres
6	169	Carter Sanderson ^{†}	Pittsburgh Penguins
7	193	Caleb Heil ^{†}	Tampa Bay Lightning

† incoming freshman
