= 2022–23 Denver Pioneers men's ice hockey season =

Collegiate team season

Ice Breaker Tournament, Champion NCHC, Champion NCAA Tournament, Regional Semifinal
- Conference: 1st NCHC
- Home ice: Magness Arena

Rankings
- USCHO: #6
- USA Today: #6

Record
- Overall: 30–10–0
- Conference: 19–3–0
- Home: 20–6–0
- Road: 10–2–0
- Neutral: 0–2–0

Coaches and captains
- Head coach: David Carle
- Assistant coaches: Tavis MacMillan; Dallas Ferguson; Ryan Massa
- Captain: Justin Lee
- Alternate captain(s): Kyle Mayhew; Carter Mazur; McKade Webster

The 2022–23 Denver Pioneers men's ice hockey season was the 74th season of play for the program and 10th in the NCHC. The Pioneers represented the University of Denver in the 2022–23 NCAA Division I men's ice hockey season, were coached by David Carle in his 5th season and played their home games at Magness Arena.

== Season ==
Coming off of the program's 9th National Title, Denver, had 5 of the six regulars on the blueline returning, along with starter Magnus Chrona, and offense was taken over by a mix of returners, freshmen and transfers including Carter Mazur and Massimo Rizzo.

Denver retained its #1 ranking entering the season and won the Ice Breaker Tournament to kick off the '23 season. In the second week the team was swept by Massachusetts, and finished the first month of the season with 4 straight wins. Denver regained first place and kept their spot after losing to Omaha after Thanksgiving. By the winter break, Denver had a 7-game winning streak.

The Pioneers began the second half by losing to Alaska. Denver recovered to earn a split; the loss removed them from first place. The team won a pair of 7–0 shutouts over last-place Miami, and were then swept by St. Cloud State and had a place at the conference title.

Denver was 9–1 in their final ten games and finished well ahead of everyone else for the regular season crown and Denver made the NCAA tournament with one of the four #1 seeds. As they began their postseason run, Chrona was nursing a lower-body injury and could not play in the quarterfinals. Denver defeated the Miami RedHawks. Chrona returned for the semifinal and was in goal against Colorado College. He allowed one marker on the power play. Denver was eliminated.

The Pioneers still began the NCAA tournament as the #4 overall seed and had the top spot in the East Regionale. Their opponent in the first round was Cornell, who got off to a quick start and took an early lead. The team was shut out for the 5th time that season. It was the first time in nearly 30 years that Denver had been shut out in consecutive games.

== Departures ==
Player	Position	Nationality	Cause
Ryan Barrow	Forward	Canada	Graduation (signed with Manchester Storm)
Bobby Brink	Forward	United States	Signed professional contract (Philadelphia Flyers)
Cole Guttman	Forward	United States	Graduation (signed with Chicago Blackhawks)
Reid Irwin	Forward/Defenseman	Canada	Left program (retired)
Carter Savoie	Forward	Canada	Signed professional contract (Edmonton Oilers)
Brett Stapley	Forward	Canada	Graduation (signed with Laval Rocket)
Antti Tuomisto	Defenseman	Finland	Signed professional contract (HC TPS)
Jack Works	Forward	Canada	Transferred to Michigan Tech
Cameron Wright	Forward	Canada	Graduation (signed with Colorado Eagles)

== Recruiting ==
Player	Position	Nationality	Age	Notes
Kent Anderson	Defenseman	Canada	18	Calgary, AB
Tristan Broz	Forward	United States	19	Bloomington, MN; transfer from Minnesota; selected 58th overall in 2021
Casey Dornbach	Forward	United States	25	Edina, MN; graduate transfer from Harvard
Tyler Haskins	Forward	United States	19	Rochester, MN
Tristan Lemyre	Forward	Canada	21	Mirabel, QC
Rieger Lorenz	Forward	Canada	18	Calgary, AB; selected 56th overall in 2022
Lucas Ölvestad	Defenseman	Sweden	20	Tampa, FL
Aidan Thompson	Forward	United States	20	Fort Collins, CO; selected 90th overall in 2022
Jared Wright	Forward	United States	20	Burnsville, MN; selected 169th overall in 2022

== Roster ==
As of August 26, 2022.

No.	Nat.	Player	Class	Pos	Height	Weight	DoB	Hometown	Previous team	NHL rights
2	(United States)	Sean Behrens	Sophomore	D	5' 9" (1.75 m)	178 lb (81 kg)	2003-03-31	Barrington, Illinois	USNTDP (USHL)	COL, 61st overall 2021
4	(United States)	Jack Devine	Sophomore	F	5' 11" (1.8 m)	175 lb (79 kg)	2003-10-02	Glencoe, Illinois	USNTDP (USHL)	FLA, 221st overall 2022
6	(United States)	McKade Webster (A)	Junior	F	5' 10" (1.78 m)	175 lb (79 kg)	2000-07-28	St. Louis, Missouri	Green Bay Gamblers (USHL)	TBL, 213th overall 2019
7	(United States)	Aidan Thompson	Freshman	F	5' 11" (1.8 m)	170 lb (77 kg)	2002-02-18	Fort Collins, Colorado	Lincoln Stars (USHL)	CHI, 90th overall 2022
9	(Canada)	Owen Ozar	Sophomore	F	5' 9" (1.75 m)	156 lb (71 kg)	2000-04-05	Prince Albert, Saskatchewan	Waterloo Black Hawks (USHL)	—
11	(Sweden)	Lucas Ölvestad	Freshman	D	6' 1" (1.85 m)	190 lb (86 kg)	2002-03-19	Stockholm, Sweden	Dubuque Fighting Saints (USHL)	—
13	(Canada)	Massimo Rizzo	Sophomore	F	5' 11" (1.8 m)	178 lb (81 kg)	2001-06-13	Burnaby, British Columbia	Coquitlam Express (BCHL)	CAR, 216th overall 2019
14	(Canada)	Rieger Lorenz	Freshman	F	6' 2" (1.88 m)	192 lb (87 kg)	2004-03-30	Calgary, Alberta	Okotoks Oilers (AJHL)	MIN, 56th overall 2022
15	(Canada)	Carter King	Junior	F	5' 10" (1.78 m)	185 lb (84 kg)	2001-08-30	Calgary, Alberta	Surrey Eagles (BCHL)	—
16	(United States)	Tristan Broz	Sophomore	F	6' 0" (1.83 m)	183 lb (83 kg)	2002-10-10	Bloomington, Minnesota	Minnesota (Big Ten)	PIT, 58th overall 2021
17	(United States)	Casey Dornbach	Graduate	F	6' 0" (1.83 m)	183 lb (83 kg)	1997-07-07	Edina, Minnesota	Harvard (ECAC)	—
18	(United States)	Jared Wright	Freshman	F	6' 2" (1.88 m)	176 lb (80 kg)	2002-11-22	Burnsville, Minnesota	Omaha Lancers (USHL)	LAK, 169th overall 2022
19	(United States)	Tyler Haskins	Freshman	F	6' 1" (1.85 m)	170 lb (77 kg)	2003-07-07	Rochester, Minnesota	Madison Capitols (USHL)	—
20	(Canada)	Michael Benning	Junior	D	5' 9" (1.75 m)	178 lb (81 kg)	2002-01-05	St. Albert, Alberta	Sherwood Park Crusaders (AJHL)	FLA, 95th overall 2020
21	(Canada)	Kent Anderson	Freshman	D	6' 3" (1.91 m)	205 lb (93 kg)	2003-11-13	Calgary, Alberta	Green Bay Gamblers (USHL)	—
22	(United States)	Connor Caponi	Junior	F	5' 9" (1.75 m)	186 lb (84 kg)	2000-03-20	Milwaukee, Wisconsin	Waterloo Black Hawks (USHL)	—
23	(United States)	Lane Krenzen	Senior	D	5' 10" (1.78 m)	188 lb (85 kg)	1998-02-21	Twig, Minnesota	Austin Bruins (NAHL)	—
26	(United States)	Shai Buium	Sophomore	D	6' 3" (1.91 m)	220 lb (100 kg)	2003-03-26	San Diego, California	Sioux City Musketeers (USHL)	DET, 36th overall 2021
27	(United States)	Kyle Mayhew (A)	Graduate	D	5' 7" (1.7 m)	158 lb (72 kg)	1997-12-25	Anaheim Hills, California	Fairbanks Ice Dogs (NAHL)	—
28	(Canada)	Brett Edwards	Senior	F	5' 11" (1.8 m)	192 lb (87 kg)	1998-09-10	Grande Prairie, Alberta	Drumheller Dragons (AJHL)	—
29	(Canada)	Tristan Lemyre	Freshman	F	5' 9" (1.75 m)	170 lb (77 kg)	2001-01-15	Mirabel, Quebec	Dubuque Fighting Saints (USHL)	—
30	(Sweden)	Magnus Chrona	Senior	G	6' 5" (1.96 m)	218 lb (99 kg)	2000-08-28	Stockholm, Sweden	Skellefteå J20 (J20 SuperElit)	SJS, 152nd overall 2018
31	(United States)	Jack Caruso	Junior	G	5' 9" (1.75 m)	187 lb (85 kg)	1999-06-07	St. Louis, Missouri	Fairbanks Ice Dogs (NAHL)	—
32	(Canada)	Justin Lee (C)	Senior	D	6' 0" (1.83 m)	185 lb (84 kg)	2000-03-14	Waskada, Manitoba	Fargo Force (USHL)	—
34	(United States)	Carter Mazur (A)	Sophomore	F	6' 0" (1.83 m)	173 lb (78 kg)	2002-03-28	Jackson, Michigan	Tri-City Storm (USHL)	DET, 70th overall 2021
35	(Canada)	Matt Davis	Sophomore	G	6' 0" (1.83 m)	179 lb (81 kg)	2001-06-16	Calgary, Alberta	Green Bay Gamblers (USHL)	—

== Standings ==
2022–23 National Collegiate Hockey Conference Standings
	Conference record										Overall record					
	GP	W	L	T	OTW	OTL	SW	PTS	GF	GA	GP	W	L	T	GF	GA
#6 Denver †	24	19	5	0	2	1	0	56	94	53	40	30	10	0	150	86
#11 Western Michigan	24	15	8	1	2	0	0	44	86	60	39	23	15	1	148	102
#20 Omaha	24	13	9	2	2	2	1	42	71	64	37	19	15	3	109	97
#5 St. Cloud State *	24	12	9	3	2	1	3	41	85	68	41	25	13	3	133	95
Minnesota Duluth	24	10	14	0	1	4	0	33	65	81	37	16	20	1	95	114
#17 North Dakota	24	10	10	4	3	0	2	33	75	70	39	18	15	6	127	110
Colorado College	24	6	15	3	0	2	2	25	37	60	38	13	22	3	79	99
Miami	24	3	18	3	0	2	0	14	39	96	36	8	24	4	73	137
Championship: March 18, 2023 † indicates conference regular season champion (Penrose Cup) * indicates conference tournament champion (Frozen Faceoff Championship Trophy); Rankings: USCHO.com Top 20 Poll

== Schedule and results ==
Date	Time	Opponent^{#}	Rank^{#}	Site	TV	Decision	Result	Attendance	Record
Exhibition
October 1	6:00 PM	at UNLV*	#1	Magness Arena • Denver, Colorado		Chrona	W 10–0	4,781	
Ice Breaker Tournament
October 7	7:05 PM	#11 Notre Dame*	#1	Magness Arena • Denver, Colorado (Ice Breaker Tournament)	Altitude	Chrona	W 5–2	5,859	1–0–0
October 8	6:00 PM	Maine*	#1	Magness Arena • Denver, Colorado (Ice Breaker Tournament)	Altitude	Davis	W 3–1	5,447	2–0–0
Regular Season
October 14	5:00 PM	at #13 Massachusetts*	#1	Mullins Center • Amherst, Massachusetts	ESPN+	Chrona	L 2–4	7,297	2–1–0
October 15	5:00 PM	at #13 Massachusetts*	#1	Mullins Center • Amherst, Massachusetts	ESPN+	Chrona	L 0–3	6,315	2–2–0
October 21	7:00 PM	#11 Providence*	#4	Magness Arena • Denver, Colorado	Evoca	Chrona	W 4–1	5,218	3–2–0
October 22	6:00 PM	#11 Providence*	#4	Magness Arena • Denver, Colorado	Evoca	Chrona	W 3–2	6,324	4–2–0
October 28	5:00 PM	at Miami	#3	Steve Cady Arena • Oxford, Ohio		Chrona	W 4–0	1,921	5–2–0 (1–0–0)
October 29	5:00 PM	at Miami	#3	Steve Cady Arena • Oxford, Ohio		Chrona	W 4–2	2,011	6–2–0 (2–0–0)
November 4	7:00 PM	#4 St. Cloud State	#2	Magness Arena • Denver, Colorado	Altitude	Chrona	L 3–4 ^{OT}	6,015	6–3–0 (2–1–0)
November 5	6:00 PM	#4 St. Cloud State	#2	Magness Arena • Denver, Colorado	Evoca	Chrona	W 3–2	6,220	7–3–0 (3–1–0)
November 11	6:00 PM	at #12 North Dakota	#2	Ralph Engelstad Arena • Grand Forks, North Dakota (Rivalry)	Midco	Chrona	W 3–2	11,738	8–3–0 (4–1–0)
November 12	5:00 PM	at #12 North Dakota	#2	Ralph Engelstad Arena • Grand Forks, North Dakota (Rivalry)	Midco	Chrona	W 6–3	11,852	9–3–0 (5–1–0)
November 25	7:00 PM	Omaha	#1	Magness Arena • Denver, Colorado		Chrona	L 0–3	5,689	9–4–0 (5–2–0)
November 26	6:00 PM	Omaha	#1	Magness Arena • Denver, Colorado		Chrona	W 6–3	5,269	10–4–0 (6–2–0)
December 2	7:00 PM	Arizona State*	#1	Magness Arena • Denver, Colorado	Altitude 2	Chrona	W 3–2	5,260	11–4–0
December 3	6:00 PM	vs. Arizona State*	#1	Magness Arena • Denver, Colorado		Davis	W 5–2	5,510	12–4–0
December 9	6:00 PM	at Minnesota Duluth	#1	AMSOIL Arena • Duluth, Minnesota	MY9	Chrona	W 3–2	6,487	13–4–0 (7–2–0)
December 10	6:00 PM	at Minnesota Duluth	#1	AMSOIL Arena • Duluth, Minnesota	MY9	Chrona	W 4–3 ^{OT}	6,354	14–4–0 (8–2–0)
December 16	7:00 PM	Lindenwood*	#1	Magness Arena • Denver, Colorado	Altitude 2	Davis	W 5–0	4,944	15–4–0
December 17	6:00 PM	Lindenwood*	#1	Magness Arena • Denver, Colorado		Davis	W 5–4	5,268	16–4–0
January 6	7:00 PM	Alaska*	#1	Magness Arena • Denver, Colorado	Altitude 2	Crona	L 1–3	6,221	16–5–0
January 7	6:00 PM	Alaska*	#1	Magness Arena • Denver, Colorado		Crona	W 7–2	6,254	17–5–0
January 13	7:00 PM	Miami	#4	Magness Arena • Denver, Colorado		Crona	W 7–0	5,858	18–5–0 (9–2–0)
January 14	6:00 PM	Miami	#4	Magness Arena • Denver, Colorado	Altitude 2	Crona	W 7–0	-	19–5–0 (10–2–0)
January 20	6:30 PM	at #4 St. Cloud State	#3	Herb Brooks National Hockey Center • St. Cloud, Minnesota	FOX 9+	Crona	L 3–7	4,080	19–6–0 (10–3–0)
January 21	5:00 PM	at #4 St. Cloud State	#3	Herb Brooks National Hockey Center • St. Cloud, Minnesota	FOX 9+	Crona	L 0–2	5,148	19–7–0 (10–4–0)
January 27	7:00 PM	Colorado College	#5	Ball Arena • Denver, Colorado (Rivalry)	Altitude	Crona	W 2–0	17,952	20–7–0 (11–4–0)
February 4	6:00 PM	at Colorado College	#4	Ed Robson Arena • Colorado Springs, Colorado (Rivalry)	ATTRM	Crona	W 4–1	3,892	21–7–0 (12–4–0)
February 10	7:00 PM	North Dakota	#4	Magness Arena • Denver, Colorado (Rivalry)	CBSSN	Crona	W 5–3	5,979	22–7–0 (13–4–0)
February 11	6:00 PM	North Dakota	#4	Magness Arena • Denver, Colorado (Rivalry)		Crona	W 5–2	6,193	23–7–0 (14–4–0)
February 17	7:00 PM	Minnesota Duluth	#3	Magness Arena • Denver, Colorado		Crona	W 6–2	6,218	24–7–0 (15–4–0)
February 18	6:00 PM	Minnesota Duluth	#3	Magness Arena • Denver, Colorado	Altitude 2, TSN2	Davis	L 5–6	6,361	24–8–0 (15–5–0)
February 24	5:00 PM	at #5 Western Michigan	#3	Lawson Arena • Kalamazoo, Michigan	CBSSN	Chrona	W 5–2	3,947	25–8–0 (16–5–0)
February 25	4:00 PM	at #5 Western Michigan	#3	Lawson Arena • Kalamazoo, Michigan		Chrona	W 3–1	4,419	26–8–0 (17–5–0)
March 3	7:00 PM	Colorado College	#3	Magness Arena • Denver, Colorado (Rivalry)	CBSSN	Chrona	W 2–1	6,667	27–8–0 (18–5–0)
March 4	6:00 PM	at Colorado College	#3	Ed Robson Arena • Colorado Springs, Colorado (Rivalry)	ATTRM	Chrona	W 4–2	3,894	28–8–0 (19–5–0)
NCHC Tournament
March 10	7:00 PM	Miami*	#3	Magness Arena • Denver, Colorado (Quarterfinal Game 1)		Davis	W 6–2	4,873	29–8–0
March 11	6:00 PM	Miami*	#3	Magness Arena • Denver, Colorado (Quarterfinal Game 2)		Davis	W 7–2	5,567	30–8–0
March 17	3:00 PM	vs. Colorado College*	#3	Xcel Energy Center • Saint Paul, Minnesota (Semifinal, Rivalry)	CBSSN	Chrona	L 0–1	10,242	30–9–0
NCAA Tournament
March 23	3:30 PM	vs. #12 Cornell*	#4	SNHU Arena • Manchester, New Hampshire (East Regional Semifinal)	ESPNews	Chrona	L 0–2	3,631	30–10–0
*Non-conference game. ^{#}Rankings from USCHO.com Poll. All times are in Mountain Time. Source:

== Scoring statistics ==
Name	Position	Games	Goals	Assists	Points	PIM
Massimo Rizzo	C	38	17	29	46	14
Carter Mazur	LW	40	22	15	37	32
Casey Dornbach	F	40	13	21	34	29
Michael Benning	D	39	13	21	34	38
Aidan Thompson	C	32	10	22	32	4
Jack Devine	RW	38	14	17	31	19
Tristan Broz	C	40	10	18	28	35
Carter King	F	38	11	12	23	6
Shai Buium	D	38	4	17	21	18
Sean Behrens	D	31	3	18	21	29
McKade Webster	LW	30	6	8	14	34
Kyle Mayhew	D	40	2	11	13	18
Justin Lee	D	40	6	7	13	59
Jared Wright	LW	34	8	4	12	2
Rieger Lorenz	C/LW	37	2	7	9	20
Tristan Lemyre	D	17	4	3	7	2
Owen Ozar	F	27	1	5	6	10
Connor Caponi	F	39	2	4	6	26
Brett Edwards	F	38	1	4	5	18
Lucas Ölvestad	F	22	1	3	4	10
Kent Anderson	D	22	0	2	2	4
Magnus Chrona	G	32	0	1	1	2
Tyler Haskins	F	13	0	1	1	0
Lane Krenzen	D	12	0	0	0	2
Matt Davis	G	13	0	0	0	0
Jack Caruso	G	3	0	0	0	0
Total			150	250	400	431

== Goaltending statistics ==
Name	Games	Minutes	Wins	Losses	Ties	Goals against	Saves	Shut outs	SV %	GAA
Jack Caruso	3	11:08	0	0	0	0	4	0	1.000	0.00
Matt Davis	13	509:27	8	1	0	15	185	1	.925	1.77
Magnus Chrona	32	1861:43	22	9	0	68	739	4	.916	2.19
Empty Net	-	27:35	-	-	-	3	-	-	-	-
Total	40	2409:53	30	10	0	86	928	5	.915	2.14

== Rankings ==
Poll	Week																											
Poll	Pre	1	2	3	4	5	6	7	8	9	10	11	12	13	14	15	16	17	18	19	20	21	22	23	24	25	26	27 (Final)
USCHO.com	1 (37)	-	1 (41)	1 (46)	4	3 (7)	2 (15)	2 (5)	1 (44)	1 (41)	1 (17)	1 (29)	1 (26)	-	1 (29)	4 (3)	3 (4)	5	4 (1)	4	3 (7)	3	3	3	3	4 (1)	-	6
USA Today	1 (25)	1 (25)	1 (30)	1 (33)	4	3 (4)	2 (15)	2 (1)	1 (29)	1 (25)	2 (10)	1 (14)	1 (15)	2 (13)	2 (14)	3 (2)	3	3	4 (2)	4	3 (1)	3	3	3	3	4	7	6

Note: USCHO did not release a poll in weeks 1, 13, or 26.

== Awards and honors ==
Player	Award	Ref
Michael Benning	AHCA West All-American Second Team	
Carter Mazur	AHCA West All-American Second Team	
Massimo Rizzo	AHCA West All-American Second Team	
Magnus Chrona	NCHC Goaltender of the Year	
Justin Lee	NCHC Defensive Defenseman of the Year	
Michael Benning	NCHC Offensive Defenseman of the Year	
Magnus Chrona	NCHC Three Stars Award	
Magnus Chrona	NCHC First Team	
Michael Benning	NCHC First Team	
Massimo Rizzo	NCHC First Team	
Carter Mazur	NCHC Second Team	

== Players drafted into the NHL ==
=== 2023 NHL entry draft ===
Round	Pick	Player	NHL team
5	133	Sam Harris ^{†}	Montreal Canadiens

† incoming freshman
