= 2022–23 North Dakota Fighting Hawks men's ice hockey season =

- Conference: T–5th NCHC
- Home ice: Ralph Engelstad Arena

Rankings
- USCHO: #17
- USA Today: #18

Record
- Overall: 18–15–6
- Conference: 10–10–6
- Home: 10–7–2
- Road: 8–6–4
- Neutral: 0–2–0

Coaches and captains
- Head coach: Brad Berry
- Assistant coaches: Dane Jackson; Karl Goehring; Jason Ulmer
- Captain: Mark Senden
- Alternate captain(s): Judd Caulfield; Ethan Frisch; Gavin Hain; Riese Gaber

The 2022–23 North Dakota Fighting Hawks men's ice hockey season was the 83rd season of play for the program and 10th in the NCHC. The Fighting Hawks represented the University of North Dakota in the 2022–23 NCAA Division I men's ice hockey season were coached by Brad Berry in his 8th season and played their home games at Ralph Engelstad Arena.

== Season ==
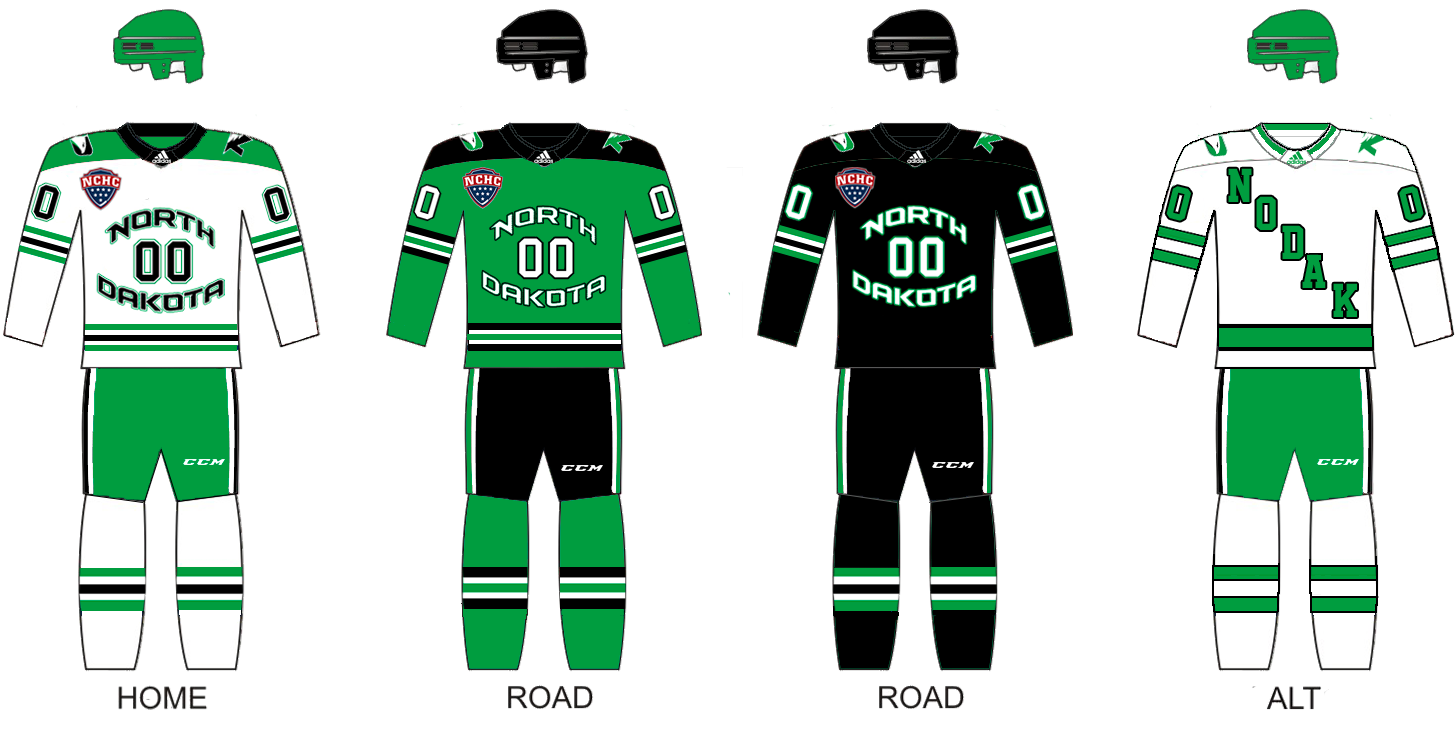
2022-23 Season Uniforms

Though the team lost its top prospect to the professional ranks, a recruiting class and the return of most of last season's players had many believing that North Dakota would compete for a national championship in 2023. The Hawks began the year at #4 in both polls and started the year in good standings, handling Holy Cross. The following week would be an early test for UND as they played host to another prospective championship contender in Quinnipiac. A problem cropped up that would stick with the team for most of the season: poor goaltending. Drew DeRidder allowed 3 goals on just 7 shots in the first and, after North Dakota took a lead in the third, Jakob Hellsten surrendered a tying goal to only earn a tie. Playing the entire game the following night, Hellsten let 5 get past him on 21 shots. Suddenly, coach Berry had a quandary on his hands as Hellsten's performance was bad enough to end their attempted goaltending rotation.

The inconsistency in goal caused the team to slowly slide down the polls until falling off entirely by Thanksgiving. The Hawks were able to score, averaging over 3 goals per game, but the offense was concentrated with three players: Jackson Blake, Riese Gaber and Chris Jandric. Collectively they accounted for nearly a third of the team's goals and points. North Dakota's offense did produce more than they had the year before, however, the subpar play in goal cancelled out any offense improvement and the lack of depth scoring also proved to be problematic.

The defense held their own, allowing and average of less than 25 against per game but neither goaltender was able to take advantage. The team tried twice more to use Hellsten as the starter but he couldn't hold the job and the Hawks had to stick with DeRidder. Near the end of the season, however, DeRidder seemed to finally find his groove and began producing good efforts night after night. By going 4–0–2 over the final three weeks, including taking a weekend from St. Cloud State, the Fighting Hawks found themselves just outside the playoff picture.

Entering the postseason, it was just possible, if unlikely, for North Dakota to earn an at-large bid without a conference championship. Those faint hopes were nearly extinguished when the UND offense could only muster a single goal against Omaha despite getting 41 shots on goal. The team rallied in the rematch to set up a deciding third game to keep their season alive. The Hawks got down twice in the game but scored the final 4 goals to run away with a win and advance to the semifinal.

Entering championship weekend, North Dakota had risen up to 18 in the PairWise rankings. It was mathematically impossible for UND to earn an at-large bid. Any bonus they got from making the final would be lost by losing the championship game. With the Hawks knowing that they had to win it all to make the tournament, they fought hard against St. Cloud State, who had already punched their ticket. The defense did its job by stifling the Huskies' attack, allowing just 15 shots against in regulation. Their offense gave the Hawks two separate 1-goal leads but they were unable to hold onto either and the two teams finished the first 60 minutes tied at 2-all. St. Cloud cranked up the pressure in overtime, trying to get the winning goal straight away. DeRidder stopped 6 shots in the first 5 minutes but he was unable to prevent the 6th and Zach Okabe's marker ended the Hawks' season.

== Departures ==
Player	Position	Nationality	Cause
Brendan Budy	Forward	Canada	Transferred to Rensselaer
Ashton Calder	Forward	United States	Graduate transfer to Penn State
Zach Driscoll	Goaltender	United States	Graduation (signed with Toledo Walleye)
Harrison Feeney	Goaltender	United States	Graduation (signed with Bollnäs IS)
Brady Ferner	Forward	United States	Graduation (retired)
Connor Ford	Forward	United States	Graduation (signed with Henderson Silver Knights)
Jake Sanderson	Defenseman	United States	Signed professional contract (Ottawa Senators)

== Recruiting ==
Player	Position	Nationality	Age	Notes
Jackson Blake	Forward	United States	19	Fargo, ND; selected 109th overall in 2021
Drew DeRidder	Goaltender	United States	22	Fenton, MI; graduate transfer from Michigan State
Ty Farmer	Defenseman	United States	24	O'Fallon, MO; graduate transfer from Massachusetts
Dylan James	Forward	Canada	18	Calgary, AB; selected 40th overall in 2022
Owen McLaughlin	Forward	United States	19	Spring City, PA; selected 206th overall in 2021
Ryan Sidorski	Defenseman	United States	22	Williamsville, NY; graduate transfer from Union
Ben Strinden	Forward	United States	20	Fargo, ND; selected 210th overall in 2022

== Roster ==
As of August 24, 2022.

No.	Nat.	Player	Class	Pos	Height	Weight	DoB	Hometown	Previous team	NHL rights
1	(United States)	Kaleb Johnson	Freshman (RS)	G	5' 9" (1.75 m)	182 lb (83 kg)	2001-01-07	Grand Forks, North Dakota	Minnesota Wilderness (NAHL)	—
2	(United States)	Ryan Sidorski	Graduate	D	6' 2" (1.88 m)	215 lb (98 kg)	1999-10-02	Williamsville, New York	Union (ECAC)	—
3	(United States)	Ty Farmer	Graduate	D	5' 8" (1.73 m)	183 lb (83 kg)	1998-01-06	O'Fallon, Missouri	UMass (HEA)	—
4	(United States)	Cooper Moore	Junior	D	6' 2" (1.88 m)	188 lb (85 kg)	2001-02-16	Riverside, Connecticut	Chilliwack (BCHL)	DET, 128th overall 2019
5	(United States)	Dane Montgomery	Sophomore	F	5' 9" (1.75 m)	169 lb (77 kg)	2002-01-07	Grand Forks, North Dakota	Waterloo (USHL)	—
6	(United States)	Brent Johnson	Sophomore	D	5' 9" (1.75 m)	174 lb (79 kg)	2003-03-20	Frisco, Texas	Sioux Falls (USHL)	WSH, 80th overall 2021
7	(Canada)	Chris Jandric	Graduate	D	5' 9" (1.75 m)	180 lb (82 kg)	1998-10-03	Prince George, British Columbia	Alaska (WCHA)	—
8	(United States)	Jake Schmaltz	Sophomore	F	6' 2" (1.88 m)	186 lb (84 kg)	2001-04-24	McFarland, Wisconsin	Green Bay (USHL)	BOS, 192nd overall 2019
9	(United States)	Jackson Blake	Freshman	F	5' 9" (1.75 m)	165 lb (75 kg)	2003-08-03	Eden Prairie, Minnesota	Chicago (USHL)	CAR, 109th overall 2021
10	(United States)	Gavin Hain (A)	Graduate	F	6' 0" (1.83 m)	193 lb (88 kg)	2000-04-03	Grand Rapids, Minnesota	NTDP (USHL)	PHI, 174th overall 2018
11	(United States)	Griffin Ness	Junior	F	5' 9" (1.75 m)	170 lb (77 kg)	1999-12-10	Wayzata, Minnesota	Waterloo (USHL)	—
13	(Canada)	Carson Albrecht	Senior	F	5' 8" (1.73 m)	188 lb (85 kg)	1998-05-23	Martensville, Saskatchewan	Melfort (SJHL)	—
15	(United States)	Ethan Frisch (A)	Senior	D	5' 10" (1.78 m)	192 lb (87 kg)	2000-10-29	Moorhead, Minnesota	Fargo (USHL)	—
17	(Canada)	Riese Gaber (A)	Junior	F	5' 7" (1.7 m)	163 lb (74 kg)	1999-10-10	Gilbert Plains, Manitoba	Dubuque (USHL)	—
18	(Canada)	Matteo Costantini	Sophomore	F	6' 1" (1.85 m)	190 lb (86 kg)	2002-08-16	St. Catharines, Ontario	Sioux City (USHL)	BUF, 131st overall 2020
19	(United States)	Mark Senden (C)	Graduate	F	5' 8" (1.73 m)	201 lb (91 kg)	1998-01-22	Medina, Minnesota	Fargo (USHL)	—
20	(United States)	Nick Portz	Sophomore	F	5' 9" (1.75 m)	174 lb (79 kg)	2000-05-15	St. Cloud, Minnesota	Muskegon (USHL)	—
21	(United States)	Ben Strinden	Freshman	F	6' 1" (1.85 m)	196 lb (89 kg)	2002-06-04	Fargo, North Dakota	Muskegon (USHL)	NSH, 210th overall 2022
22	(United States)	Owen McLaughlin	Freshman	F	6' 0" (1.83 m)	156 lb (71 kg)	2003-03-25	Spring City, Pennsylvania	Sioux City (USHL)	—
24	(Canada)	Luke Bast	Sophomore	D	5' 8" (1.73 m)	178 lb (81 kg)	2000-11-20	Red Deer, Alberta	Waterloo (USHL)	—
25	(United States)	Tyler Kleven	Junior	D	6' 4" (1.93 m)	213 lb (97 kg)	2002-01-10	Fargo, North Dakota	NTDP (USHL)	OTT, 44th overall 2020
26	(Canada)	Dylan James	Freshman	F	6' 0" (1.83 m)	180 lb (82 kg)	2003-10-12	Calgary, Alberta	Sioux City (USHL)	DET, 40th overall 2022
27	(Canada)	Louis Jamernik V	Junior	F	5' 9" (1.75 m)	203 lb (92 kg)	2000-02-22	Calgary, Alberta	Okotoks (AJHL)	—
28	(United States)	Judd Caulfield (A)	Senior	F	6' 3" (1.91 m)	212 lb (96 kg)	2001-03-19	Grand Forks, North Dakota	NTDP (USHL)	PIT, 145th overall 2019
29	(United States)	Jackson Kunz	Sophomore	F	6' 3" (1.91 m)	228 lb (103 kg)	2002-08-13	Grand Forks, North Dakota	Green Bay (USHL)	VAN, 113th overall 2020
32	(Sweden)	Jakob Hellsten	Sophomore	G	5' 10" (1.78 m)	190 lb (86 kg)	2000-02-02	Ljusdal, Sweden	Halmstad (Hockeyettan)	—
34	(United States)	Drew DeRidder	Graduate	G	5' 9" (1.75 m)	178 lb (81 kg)	2000-05-01	Fenton, Michigan	Michigan State (Big Ten)	—

== Standings ==
2022–23 National Collegiate Hockey Conference Standings
	Conference record										Overall record					
	GP	W	L	T	OTW	OTL	SW	PTS	GF	GA	GP	W	L	T	GF	GA
#6 Denver †	24	19	5	0	2	1	0	56	94	53	40	30	10	0	150	86
#11 Western Michigan	24	15	8	1	2	0	0	44	86	60	39	23	15	1	148	102
#20 Omaha	24	13	9	2	2	2	1	42	71	64	37	19	15	3	109	97
#5 St. Cloud State *	24	12	9	3	2	1	3	41	85	68	41	25	13	3	133	95
Minnesota Duluth	24	10	14	0	1	4	0	33	65	81	37	16	20	1	95	114
#17 North Dakota	24	10	10	4	3	0	2	33	75	70	39	18	15	6	127	110
Colorado College	24	6	15	3	0	2	2	25	37	60	38	13	22	3	79	99
Miami	24	3	18	3	0	2	0	14	39	96	36	8	24	4	73	137
Championship: March 18, 2023 † indicates conference regular season champion (Penrose Cup) * indicates conference tournament champion (Frozen Faceoff Championship Trophy); Rankings: USCHO.com Top 20 Poll

== Schedule and results ==
Date	Time	Opponent^{#}	Rank^{#}	Site	TV	Decision	Result	Attendance	Record
Exhibition
October 1	6:07 PM	Manitoba*	#4	Ralph Engelstad Arena • Grand Forks, North Dakota (Exhibition)	Midco	DeRidder	W 5–1	11,568	—
Regular Season
October 7	7:07 PM	Holy Cross*	#3	Ralph Engelstad Arena • Grand Forks, North Dakota	Midco	DeRidder	W 6–0	11,181	1–0–0
October 8	6:07 PM	Holy Cross*	#3	Ralph Engelstad Arena • Grand Forks, North Dakota	Midco	Hellsten	W 4–1	11,376	2–0–0
October 14	7:07 PM	#8 Quinnipiac*	#3	Ralph Engelstad Arena • Grand Forks, North Dakota	Midco	Hellsten	T 5–5 ^{OT}	10,875	2–0–1
October 15	6:07 PM	#8 Quinnipiac*	#3	Ralph Engelstad Arena • Grand Forks, North Dakota	Midco	Hellsten	L 2–6	11,680	2–1–1
October 21	7:00 PM	at #1 Minnesota*	#7	3M Arena at Mariucci • Minneapolis, Minnesota (Rivalry)	BSN+	DeRidder	L 2–3 ^{OT}	10,418	2–2–1
October 22	7:00 PM	at #1 Minnesota*	#7	3M Arena at Mariucci • Minneapolis, Minnesota (Rivalry)	BSN	DeRidder	W 5–4 ^{OT}	10,193	3–2–1
October 29	9:07 PM	vs. Arizona State*	#6	T-Mobile Arena • Las Vegas, Nevada (US Hockey Hall of Fame Game)	Midco	DeRidder	L 2–3	15,503	3–3–1
November 4	7:07 PM	at Omaha	#10	Baxter Arena • Omaha, Nebraska	Midco	DeRidder	W 4–1	6,543	4–3–1 (1–0–0)
November 5	7:07 PM	at Omaha	#10	Baxter Arena • Omaha, Nebraska	Midco	DeRidder	T 3–3 ^{SOL}	6,314	4–3–2 (1–0–1)
November 11	7:07 PM	#2 Denver	#12	Ralph Engelstad Arena • Grand Forks, North Dakota (Rivalry)	Midco	DeRidder	L 2–3	11,738	4–4–2 (1–1–1)
November 12	7:07 PM	#2 Denver	#12	Ralph Engelstad Arena • Grand Forks, North Dakota (Rivalry)	Midco	Hellsten	L 3–6	11,852	4–5–2 (1–2–1)
November 18	7:07 PM	Miami	#19	Ralph Engelstad Arena • Grand Forks, North Dakota	Midco	Hellsten	W 7–1	10,823	5–5–2 (2–2–1)
November 19	6:07 PM	Miami	#19	Ralph Engelstad Arena • Grand Forks, North Dakota	Midco	Hellsten	L 3–4	10,815	5–6–2 (2–3–1)
November 25	7:37 PM	at Bemidji State*		Sanford Center • Bemidji, Minnesota	FloHockey	Hellsten	T 3–3 ^{OT}	3,712	5–6–3
November 26	6:07 PM	Bemidji State*		Ralph Engelstad Arena • Grand Forks, North Dakota	Midco	Hellsten	W 4–2	11,470	6–6–3
December 2	7:30 PM	at #3 St. Cloud State		Herb Brooks National Hockey Center • St. Cloud, Minnesota	FOX 9+	Hellsten	L 2–7	4,529	6–7–3 (2–4–3)
December 3	6:00 PM	at #3 St. Cloud State		Herb Brooks National Hockey Center • St. Cloud, Minnesota	FOX 9+	DeRidder	L 3–6	5,017	6–8–3 (2–5–3)
December 9	6:05 PM	at #17 Western Michigan		Lawson Arena • Kalamazoo, Michigan		DeRidder	T 2–2 ^{SOW}	3,239	6–8–4 (2–5–4)
December 10	5:05 PM	at #17 Western Michigan		Lawson Arena • Kalamazoo, Michigan		DeRidder	W 3–0	3,498	7–8–4 (3–5–4)
Exhibition
December 31	4:07 PM	USNTDP*		Ralph Engelstad Arena • Grand Forks, North Dakota (Exhibition)	Midco	Johnson	W 4–3 ^{OT}	11,034	—
Regular Season
January 6	7:07 PM	Lindenwood*		Ralph Engelstad Arena • Grand Forks, North Dakota	Midco	Hellsten	W 4–3	10,354	8–8–4
January 7	6:07 PM	Lindenwood*		Ralph Engelstad Arena • Grand Forks, North Dakota	Midco	Hellsten	W 4–2	11,616	9–8–4
January 13	7:07 PM	#12 Western Michigan		Ralph Engelstad Arena • Grand Forks, North Dakota	Midco	Hellsten	L 0–4	11,022	9–9–4 (3–6–4)
January 14	6:07 PM	#12 Western Michigan		Ralph Engelstad Arena • Grand Forks, North Dakota	Midco	Johnson	L 6–7	11,664	9–10–4 (3–7–4)
January 20	7:07 PM	Minnesota Duluth		Ralph Engelstad Arena • Grand Forks, North Dakota	Midco	DeRidder	W 4–2	11,643	10–10–4 (4–7–4)
January 21	6:07 PM	Minnesota Duluth		Ralph Engelstad Arena • Grand Forks, North Dakota	Midco	DeRidder	L 1–2	11,773	10–11–4 (4–8–4)
January 27	6:05 PM	at Miami		Steve Cady Arena • Oxford, Ohio	CBSSN	DeRidder	W 4–1	2,745	11–11–4 (5–8–4)
January 28	6:05 PM	at Miami		Steve Cady Arena • Oxford, Ohio		DeRidder	W 8–0	2,808	12–11–4 (6–8–4)
February 10	8:00 PM	at #4 Denver		Magness Arena • Denver, Colorado (Rivalry)	CBSSN	DeRidder	L 3–5	5,979	12–12–4 (6–9–4)
February 11	11:00 PM	at #4 Denver		Magness Arena • Denver, Colorado (Rivalry)		DeRidder	L 2–5	6,193	12–13–4 (6–10–4)
February 17	7:07 PM	#6 St. Cloud State		Ralph Engelstad Arena • Grand Forks, North Dakota	CBSSN	DeRidder	W 4–3 ^{OT}	11,486	13–13–4 (7–10–4)
February 18	6:07 PM	#6 St. Cloud State		Ralph Engelstad Arena • Grand Forks, North Dakota	Midco	DeRidder	T 2–2 ^{SOL}	11,751	13–13–5 (7–10–5)
February 24	8:30 PM	at Colorado College		Ed Robson Arena • Colorado Springs, Colorado	ATTRM	DeRidder	W 2–1 ^{OT}	3,481	14–13–5 (8–10–5)
February 25	7:00 PM	at Colorado College		Ed Robson Arena • Colorado Springs, Colorado		DeRidder	T 0–0 ^{SOW}	3,501	14–13–6 (8–10–6)
March 3	7:07 PM	#14 Omaha		Ralph Engelstad Arena • Grand Forks, North Dakota	Midco	DeRidder	W 5–4 ^{OT}	11,728	15–13–6 (9–10–6)
March 4	6:07 PM	#14 Omaha		Ralph Engelstad Arena • Grand Forks, North Dakota	Midco	DeRidder	W 2–1	11,731	16–13–6 (10–10–6)
NCHC Tournament
March 10	6:07 PM	at #17 Omaha*		Baxter Arena • Omaha, Nebraska (Quarterfinal Game 1)	Midco	DeRidder	L 1–2	6,510	16–14–6
March 11	6:07 PM	at #17 Omaha*		Baxter Arena • Omaha, Nebraska (Quarterfinal Game 2)	Midco	DeRidder	W 3–1	7,348	17–14–6
March 12	5:07 PM	at #17 Omaha*		Baxter Arena • Omaha, Nebraska (Quarterfinal Game 3)	Midco	DeRidder	W 5–2	5,571	18–14–6
March 17	7:30 PM	vs. #7 St. Cloud State*	#17	Xcel Energy Center • Saint Paul, Minnesota (Semifinal)	CBSSN	DeRidder	L 2–3	10,242	18–15–6
*Non-conference game. ^{#}Rankings from USCHO.com Poll. All times are in Central Time. Source:

== Scoring statistics ==
Name	Position	Games	Goals	Assists	Points	PIM
Jackson Blake	RW/C	39	16	26	42	16
Riese Gaber	RW	39	20	17	37	31
Chris Jandric	D	39	4	29	33	30
Judd Caulfield	RW	39	10	9	19	12
Gavin Hain	C	36	11	7	18	45
Tyler Kleven	D	35	8	10	18	84
Ethan Frisch	D	36	7	11	18	14
Mark Senden	C	39	7	10	17	22
Dylan James	LW	36	8	8	16	6
Owen McLaughlin	C	37	2	13	15	10
Louis Jamernik	RW	39	3	11	14	22
Cooper Moore	D	31	3	10	13	34
Jake Schmaltz	C/LW	34	5	7	12	2
Ty Farmer	D	37	1	10	11	27
Ben Strinden	C	22	3	6	9	14
Nick Portz	F	27	2	7	9	4
Ryan Sidorski	D	36	0	9	9	16
Griffin Ness	F	27	5	1	6	12
Carson Albrecht	RW	26	3	3	6	0
Brent Johnson	D	13	1	5	6	6
Jackson Kunz	C	24	5	0	5	10
Matteo Costantini	C	25	2	1	3	4
Luke Bast	D	13	1	2	3	10
Jakob Hellsten	G	13	0	1	1	0
Drew DeRidder	G	30	0	1	1	0
Kaleb Johnson	G	1	0	0	0	0
Total			127	213	340	421

== Goaltending statistics ==
Name	Games	Minutes	Wins	Losses	Ties	Goals against	Saves	Shut outs	SV %	GAA
Drew DeRidder	30	1615:35	13	9	4	68	607	4	.899	2.53
Jakob Hellsten	13	684:05	5	5	2	31	217	0	.875	2.72
Kaleb Johnson	1	58:39	0	1	0	7	28	0	.800	7.16
Empty Net	-	23:09	-	-	-	4	-	-	-	-
Total	39	2381:28	18	15	6	110	852	4	.887	2.77

== Rankings ==
Poll	Week																											
Poll	Pre	1	2	3	4	5	6	7	8	9	10	11	12	13	14	15	16	17	18	19	20	21	22	23	24	25	26	27 (Final)
USCHO.com	4	-	3 (1)	3 (2)	7	6	10	12	19	NR	NR	NR	NR	-	NR	NR	NR	NR	NR	NR	NR	NR	NR	NR	17	17	-	17
USA Today	4	4	3	3	7	7	11	13	19	NR	NR	NR	NR	NR	NR	NR	NR	NR	NR	NR	NR	NR	NR	NR	16	16	16	18

Note: USCHO did not release a poll in weeks 1, 13, or 26.

== Awards and honors ==
Player	Award	Ref
Jackson Blake	NCHC Rookie of the Year	
Ethan Frisch	NCHC Scholar-Athlete of the Year	
Riese Gaber	NCHC Preseason All-Conference Team	
Chris Jandric	NCHC First Team	
Jackson Blake	NCHC Second Team	
Riese Gaber	NCHC Second Team	
Jackson Blake	NCHC Rookie Team	

== Players drafted into the NHL ==
=== 2023 NHL entry draft ===
Round	Pick	Player	NHL team
3	94	Jayden Perron ^{†}	Carolina Hurricanes
4	98	Andrew Strathmann ^{†}	Columbus Blue Jackets
6	190	Michael Emerson ^{†}	Carolina Hurricanes
6	196	David Klee ^{†}	San Jose Sharks

† incoming freshman
