= 2022–23 St. Cloud State Huskies men's ice hockey season =

NCHC Tournament, Champion NCAA Tournament, Regional Final
- Conference: 4th NCHC
- Home ice: Herb Brooks National Hockey Center

Rankings
- USCHO: #5
- USA Today: #5

Record
- Overall: 25–13–3
- Conference: 12–9–3
- Home: 16–3–2
- Road: 6–9–1
- Neutral: 3–1–0

Coaches and captains
- Head coach: Brett Larson
- Assistant coaches: Dave Shyiak; R. J. Enga; Matt Bertram
- Captain: Spencer Meier
- Alternate captains: Jami Krannila; Micah Miller; Aidan Spellacy

The 2022–23 St. Cloud State Huskies men's ice hockey season was the 88th season of play for the program, the 26th at the Division I level and 10th in the NCHC. The Huskies represented St. Cloud State University in the 2022–23 NCAA Division I men's ice hockey season, were coached by Brett Larson in his 5th season and played their home games at Herb Brooks National Hockey Center.

== Season ==
Entering the year, St. Cloud was having to contend with the loss of several key players, including two Olympians. An already veteran roster was augmented by the addition of three transfers with the biggest unknown coming in goal. Dávid Hrenák had been the team's starting goalie for 5 years and replacing him would not be an easy task. Jaxon Castor had sat behind Hrenák for 3 years with mixed results while Dominic Basse was brought in after two years with Colorado College. Coach Larson decided to alternate between the two and both netminders performed wonderfully. St. Cloud won their first 6 games of the season, including a sweep of national Runner-Up Minnesota State.

The goalies were aided by the ascension of several players, particularly Jami Krannila and Zach Okabe, who improved their performance and took over as the team's leaders. The other two transfers fit in seamlessly with their new team as Grant Cruikshank swiftly became the Huskies' top goal scoring threat. Dylan Anhorn, however, was a revelation for the club. The senior defenseman shot out of the gate and was seemingly scoring in every game He posted 21 points by the winter break and helped lift St. Cloud into the top 5 in both polls. He wasn't solely an offensive contributor as he also led the Huskies in blocked shots and +/-. In the team's first 18 games, they lost back-to-back games just once and had done no worse than break even in every weekend series. Even with the rest of the NCHC having a down year, the Huskies were one of the bright spots for the conference and were a near certainty to make the tournament at the midway point of the season.

St. Cloud didn't appear to lose any steam at the start of the second half. The goalie rotation was altered slightly, giving the two netminders more than one game at a time, but that the team from sweeping Denver in mid January to take over as the #1 team in both the NCHC standings and the national polls. Unfortunately, just before the second game against the Pios, Anhorn suffered a lower body injury in warmups and would miss the rest of the season after having surgery to fix the problem. In his wake of Anhorn's ailment, St. Cloud didn't win a game for 3 weeks and were swept by an underperforming Minnesota Duluth team. The Huskies stumbled to the finish line, ending the regular season 4th in the conference.

=== Conference tournament ===
While the Huskies had barely finished in the top half of the NCHC, they were still highly ranked overall and were guaranteed to make the NCAA tournament. That, however, was not enough for the team as St. Cloud still needed to recover its early-season form if they had any hope of making a run in the tournament. Basse was given a turn in goal and led the team into the postseason against Duluth. After a good first game, Basse crumbled in the rematch and allowed 4 goals in 22 shots. Castor got his opportunity in the deciding third game and grabbed onto his opportunity with both hands. With the offense playing well, St. Cloud edged out the Bulldogs and advanced to the semifinals.

By the time they arrived in Saint Paul, St. Cloud seemed to have figured out its defensive situation but the offense still needed some work. They fact was on full display against North Dakota as the team was only able to muster 15 shots in regulation. While they were fortunate enough to get 2 goals with that paltry output, the defense was able to hold off the Fighting Hawks and only surrendered 2 markers themselves. In overtime, however, the Huskies went on the attack and fired 6 shots in under 6 minutes. The team seized the momentum and pressed forward until Okabe broke through with the game-winner. The title game was a little more sedate with St. Cloud being in control for most of the match. Colorado College had a weak offense and couldn't keep up with the Huskies as the dogs were getting into their stride. Castor posted his third shutout of the season to lead the team to their first conference championship in 7 years.

=== NCAA tournament ===
Returning to the tournament for the 5th consecutive season, St. Cloud got a #2 seed in the western regional. However, despite being close to home, the Huskies got an unfavorable draw by having to face Minnesota State who were hot on the heels of their own championship. The defense and Castor had to weather an incessant push by the Maverick offense but the Huskies were up to the task. Despite being outshot 4–10 in the first, the scoresheet remained empty. The second was a bit more even but MSU still carried the balance of play. It wasn't until St. Cloud's second power play opportunity that they began to see things swing in their favor. Veeti Miettinen fired a seeing-eye shot through a maze of bodies from the right circle that somehow found the back of the net. About five minutes later, Jack Peart accomplished a similar feat from the top of the left circle and St. Cloud took a 2-goal lead into the final period. Minnesota State continued to press, trying to find a way to tie the game, but the couldn't solve Castor. Two more goals increased the Huskies' lead but didn't change the outcome and St. Cloud advanced to the regional final.

In yet another battle of Minnesota teams, the Huskies took on the vaunted Golden Gophers who had been the #1 team for the past few months. Even so, the Huskies had already defeated Minnesota earlier in the season so they knew that they had a solid chance going into the game. Just like the MSU game, the Gophers dominated early and outshout St. Cloud 6–14 in the first 20 minutes. Unlike the previous game, however, Minnesota was able to get out to a 1–0 lead and end Castor's shutout streak. Adam Ingram got the Huskies back even with the power play marker early in the second but that was all St. Cloud State could get. Minnesota scored the final three goals of the game, relying on their overpowering defensive corps to stifle the Huskies and win the game 4–1.

== Departures ==
Player	Position	Nationality	Cause
Easton Brodzinski	Forward	United States	Graduation (signed with Hartford Wolf Pack)
Seamus Donohue	Defenseman	United States	Graduation (signed with South Carolina Stingrays)
Kevin Fitzgerald	Forward	United States	Graduation (signed with South Carolina Stingrays)
Sam Hentges	Forward	United States	Graduation (signed with Minnesota Wild)
Dávid Hrenák	Goaltender	Slovakia	Graduation (signed with Los Angeles Kings)
Lucas Jaycox	Defenseman	United States	Graduation (signed with South Carolina Stingrays)
Jack Johnston	Forward	United States	Left program (retired)
Joseph Lamoreaux	Goaltender	United States	Transferred to Alaska Anchorage
Nick Perbix	Defenseman	United States	Graduation (signed with Tampa Bay Lightning)
Thomas Rocco	Forward	United States	Left program (retired)
Nolan Walker	Forward	United States	Graduation (signed with Toronto Marlies)

== Recruiting ==
Player	Position	Nationality	Age	Notes
Grant Ahcan	Forward	United States	20	Burnsville, MN
Dylan Anhorn	Defenseman	Canada	23	Calgary, AB; transfer from Union
Ethan Aucoin	Forward	Canada	20	Calgary, AB
Dominic Basse	Goaltender	United States	21	Alexandria, VA; transfer from Colorado College; selected 167th overall in 2019
Grant Cruikshank	Forward	United States	24	Delafield, WI; graduate transfer from Minnesota
James Gray	Goaltender	Canada	20	Toronto, ON
Adam Ingram	Forward	Canada	18	Winnipeg, MB; selected 82nd overall in 2022
Mason Reiners	Defenseman	United States	21	Edina, MN
Jack Rogers	Forward	United States	19	East Northport, NY
Cooper Wylie	Defenseman	United States	20	Stillwater, MN

== Roster ==
As of August 23, 2022.

No.	Nat.	Player	Class	Pos	Height	Weight	DoB	Hometown	Previous team	NHL rights
1	(Canada)	James Gray	Freshman	G	6' 2" (1.88 m)	190 lb (86 kg)	2002-05-24	Toronto, Ontario	North York Rangers (OJHL)	—
2	(United States)	Brady Ziemer	Junior	D	5' 10" (1.78 m)	180 lb (82 kg)	2000-05-24	Carver, Minnesota	Green Bay Gamblers (USHL)	—
4	(Canada)	Dylan Anhorn	Senior	D	6' 0" (1.83 m)	185 lb (84 kg)	1999-01-21	Calgary, Alberta	Union (ECAC)	—
5	(Czech Republic)	Ondřej Trejbal	Senior	D	6' 3" (1.91 m)	185 lb (84 kg)	1999-04-21	Hamry nad Sázavou, Czech Republic	Minnesota Wilderness (NAHL)	—
6	(United States)	Mason Reiners	Freshman	D	6' 1" (1.85 m)	195 lb (88 kg)	2001-05-03	Edina, Minnesota	Waterloo Black Hawks (USHL)	—
8	(United States)	Aidan Spellacy (A)	Graduate	F	5' 11" (1.8 m)	175 lb (79 kg)	1998-06-13	Lakewood, Ohio	Robert Morris (AHA)	—
9	(United States)	Spencer Meier (C)	Graduate	D	6' 4" (1.93 m)	212 lb (96 kg)	1999-04-15	Sartell, Minnesota	Fargo Force (USHL)	—
10	(Canada)	Kyler Kupka	Senior	F	6' 0" (1.83 m)	185 lb (84 kg)	1999-05-11	Camrose, Alberta	Camrose Kodiaks (AJHL)	—
11	(United States)	Grant Ahcan	Freshman	F	5' 10" (1.78 m)	160 lb (73 kg)	2002-05-18	Savage, Minnesota	Cedar Rapids RoughRiders (USHL)	—
12	(Canada)	Ryan Rosborough	Freshman (RS)	F	6' 3" (1.91 m)	190 lb (86 kg)	2000-05-24	Mt. Brydges, Ontario	South Shore (NCDC)	—
13	(Finland)	Jami Krannila (A)	Senior	F	5' 10" (1.78 m)	165 lb (75 kg)	2000-10-03	Nokia, Finland	Sioux Falls Stampede (USHL)	—
14	(Canada)	Zach Okabe	Senior	F	5' 9" (1.75 m)	170 lb (77 kg)	2001-01-04	Okotoks, Alberta	Grande Prairie Storm (AJHL)	—
15	(United States)	Micah Miller (A)	Graduate	F	5' 9" (1.75 m)	200 lb (91 kg)	1998-10-29	Grand Rapids, Minnesota	Sioux City Musketeers (USHL)	—
16	(United States)	Mason Salquist	Sophomore	F	5' 8" (1.73 m)	165 lb (75 kg)	2000-03-21	Grand Forks, North Dakota	Fargo Force (USHL)	—
17	(Canada)	Ethan Aucoin	Freshman	F	6' 1" (1.85 m)	170 lb (77 kg)	2002-08-10	Calgary, Alberta	Lloydminster Bobcats (AJHL)	—
18	(United States)	Brendan Bushy	Graduate	D	6' 2" (1.88 m)	230 lb (104 kg)	1998-08-23	Thief River Falls, Minnesota	Dubuque Fighting Saints (USHL)	—
19	(United States)	Grant Cruikshank	Graduate	F	5' 11" (1.8 m)	190 lb (86 kg)	1998-07-19	Delafield, Wisconsin	Minnesota (Big Ten)	—
20	(United States)	Jack Rogers	Freshman	F	6' 1" (1.85 m)	190 lb (86 kg)	2002-09-23	East Northport, New York	Steinbach Pistons (MHHL)	—
21	(United States)	Josh Luedtke	Sophomore	D	5' 9" (1.75 m)	175 lb (79 kg)	2000-09-29	Minnetonka, Minnesota	Des Moines Buccaneers (USHL)	—
22	(United States)	Joe Molenaar	Junior	F	6' 1" (1.85 m)	175 lb (79 kg)	1999-10-16	Minnetonka, Minnesota	Cedar Rapids RoughRiders (USHL)	—
23	(United States)	Jack Peart	Sophomore	D	5' 11" (1.8 m)	175 lb (79 kg)	2003-05-15	Grand Rapids, Minnesota	Grand Rapids High School (USHS–MN)	MIN, 54th overall 2021
26	(United States)	Cooper Wylie	Freshman	D	6' 1" (1.85 m)	195 lb (88 kg)	2001-10-26	Stillwater, Minnesota	Waterloo Black Hawks (USHL)	—
27	(United States)	Chase Brand	Senior	F	5' 10" (1.78 m)	165 lb (75 kg)	1999-02-25	Nevis, Minnesota	Madison Capitols (USHL)	—
29	(Finland)	Veeti Miettinen	Junior	F	5' 9" (1.75 m)	160 lb (73 kg)	2001-09-20	Espoo, Finland	Kiekko-Espoo (Nuorten SM-liiga)	TOR, 168th overall 2020
31	(United States)	Dominic Basse	Junior	G	6' 6" (1.98 m)	185 lb (84 kg)	2001-04-22	Alexandria, Virginia	Colorado College (USHL)	CHI, 167th overall 2019
34	(Canada)	Adam Ingram	Freshman	F	6' 1" (1.85 m)	175 lb (79 kg)	2003-10-14	West St. Paul, Manitoba	Youngstown Phantoms (USHL)	NSH, 82nd overall 2022
40	(United States)	Jaxon Castor	Senior	G	6' 3" (1.91 m)	200 lb (91 kg)	1997-03-14	Phoenix, Arizona	Shreveport Mudbugs (NAHL)	—

== Standings ==
2022–23 National Collegiate Hockey Conference Standings
	Conference record										Overall record					
	GP	W	L	T	OTW	OTL	SW	PTS	GF	GA	GP	W	L	T	GF	GA
#6 Denver †	24	19	5	0	2	1	0	56	94	53	40	30	10	0	150	86
#11 Western Michigan	24	15	8	1	2	0	0	44	86	60	39	23	15	1	148	102
#20 Omaha	24	13	9	2	2	2	1	42	71	64	37	19	15	3	109	97
#5 St. Cloud State *	24	12	9	3	2	1	3	41	85	68	41	25	13	3	133	95
Minnesota Duluth	24	10	14	0	1	4	0	33	65	81	37	16	20	1	95	114
#17 North Dakota	24	10	10	4	3	0	2	33	75	70	39	18	15	6	127	110
Colorado College	24	6	15	3	0	2	2	25	37	60	38	13	22	3	79	99
Miami	24	3	18	3	0	2	0	14	39	96	36	8	24	4	73	137
Championship: March 18, 2023 † indicates conference regular season champion (Penrose Cup) * indicates conference tournament champion (Frozen Faceoff Championship Trophy); Rankings: USCHO.com Top 20 Poll

== Schedule and results ==
Date	Time	Opponent^{#}	Rank^{#}	Site	TV	Decision	Result	Attendance	Record
Regular Season
October 1	6:00 PM	at St. Thomas*	#13	St. Thomas Ice Arena • Mendota Heights, Minnesota	FloHockey	Castor	W 3–1	975	1–0–0
October 2	4:00 PM	St. Thomas*	#13	Herb Brooks National Hockey Center • St. Cloud, Minnesota	FOX 9+	Basse	W 4–0	3,284	2–0–0
October 14	7:04 PM	at Wisconsin*	#10	Kohl Center • Madison, Wisconsin	BSW	Castor	W 5–1	7,030	3–0–0
October 15	7:04 PM	at Wisconsin*	#10	Kohl Center • Madison, Wisconsin	BSW	Basse	W 2–1	9,894	4–0–0
October 21	7:30 PM	#2 Minnesota State*	#8	Herb Brooks National Hockey Center • St. Cloud, Minnesota	FOX 9+	Castor	W 3–2	4,016	5–0–0
October 22	6:00 PM	#2 Minnesota State*	#8	Herb Brooks National Hockey Center • St. Cloud, Minnesota	FOX 9+	Basse	W 4–3	5,212	6–0–0
October 28	7:00 PM	at Bemidji State*	#2	Sanford Center • Bemidji, Minnesota	FloHockey	Castor	L 1–3	2,651	6–1–0
October 29	6:00 PM	Bemidji State*	#2	Herb Brooks National Hockey Center • St. Cloud, Minnesota	FOX 9+	Basse	W 4–1	4,023	7–1–0
November 4	8:00 PM	at #2 Denver	#4	Magness Arena • Denver, Colorado	Altitude	Castor	W 4–3 ^{OT}	6,015	8–1–0 (1–0–0)
November 5	7:00 PM	at #2 Denver	#4	Magness Arena • Denver, Colorado	Evoca	Basse	L 2–3	6,220	8–2–0 (1–1–0)
November 11	7:30 PM	#17 Western Michigan	#4	Herb Brooks National Hockey Center • St. Cloud, Minnesota	FOX 9+	Castor	L 2–4	3,557	8–3–0 (1–2–0)
November 12	6:00 PM	#17 Western Michigan	#4	Herb Brooks National Hockey Center • St. Cloud, Minnesota	FOX 9+	Basse	W 4–1	4,152	9–3–0 (2–2–0)
November 18	8:30 PM	at Colorado College	#4	Ed Robson Arena • Colorado Springs, Colorado	ATTRM	Castor	W 3–1	3,416	10–3–0 (3–2–0)
November 19	7:00 PM	at Colorado College	#4	Ed Robson Arena • Colorado Springs, Colorado		Basse	W 5–0	3,423	11–3–0 (4–2–0)
December 2	7:30 PM	North Dakota	#3	Herb Brooks National Hockey Center • St. Cloud, Minnesota	FOX 9+	Castor	W 7–2	4,529	12–3–0 (5–2–0)
December 3	6:00 PM	North Dakota	#3	Herb Brooks National Hockey Center • St. Cloud, Minnesota	FOX 9+	Basse	W 6–3	5,017	13–3–0 (6–2–0)
December 9	6:00 PM	at Miami	#4	Steve Cady Arena • Oxford, Ohio		Castor	W 7–3	1,213	14–3–0 (7–2–0)
December 10	4:00 PM	at Miami	#4	Steve Cady Arena • Oxford, Ohio		Basse	L 0–5	1,169	14–4–0 (7–3–0)
December 30	1:00 PM	Manitoba*	#4	Herb Brooks National Hockey Center • St. Cloud, Minnesota (Exhibition)		Castor	W 5–2	3,000	
January 7	6:00 PM	#3 Minnesota*	#4	Herb Brooks National Hockey Center • St. Cloud, Minnesota (Rivalry)	CBSSN, FOX 9+	Castor	W 3–0	6,051	15–4–0
January 8	3:00 PM	at #3 Minnesota*	#4	3M Arena at Mariucci • Minneapolis, Minnesota (Rivalry)	BSN	Castor	L 1–2 ^{OT}	10,192	15–5–0
January 13	7:30 PM	Colorado College	#3	Herb Brooks National Hockey Center • St. Cloud, Minnesota	FOX 9+	Castor	L 2–4	3,764	15–6–0 (7–4–0)
January 14	6:00 PM	Colorado College	#3	Herb Brooks National Hockey Center • St. Cloud, Minnesota	FOX 9+	Basse	W 4–0	5,103	16–6–0 (8–4–0)
January 20	7:30 PM	#3 Denver	#4	Herb Brooks National Hockey Center • St. Cloud, Minnesota	FOX 9+	Basse	W 7–3	4,080	17–6–0 (9–4–0)
January 21	6:00 PM	#3 Denver	#4	Herb Brooks National Hockey Center • St. Cloud, Minnesota	FOX 9+	Castor	W 2–0	5,148	18–6–0 (10–4–0)
January 27	7:00 PM	at Minnesota Duluth	#1	AMSOIL Arena • Duluth, Minnesota	MY9	Castor	L 3–5	6,579	18–7–0 (10–5–0)
January 28	7:00 PM	at Minnesota Duluth	#1	AMSOIL Arena • Duluth, Minnesota	MY9, FOX 9+	Basse	L 3–6	7,205	18–8–0 (10–6–0)
February 3	7:30 PM	Miami	#5	Herb Brooks National Hockey Center • St. Cloud, Minnesota	FOX 9+	Basse	T 3–3 ^{SOW}	3,685	18–8–1 (10–6–1)
February 4	6:00 PM	Miami	#5	Herb Brooks National Hockey Center • St. Cloud, Minnesota	FOX 9+	Basse	T 1–1 ^{SOW}	4,189	18–8–2 (10–6–2)
February 17	7:07 PM	at North Dakota	#6	Ralph Engelstad Arena • Grand Forks, North Dakota	CBSSN	Basse	L 3–4 ^{OT}	11,486	18–9–2 (10–7–2)
February 18	6:07 PM	at North Dakota	#6	Ralph Engelstad Arena • Grand Forks, North Dakota	Midco	Castor	T 2–2 ^{SOW}	11,751	18–9–3 (10–7–3)
February 24	7:00 PM	at #14 Omaha	#6	Baxter Arena • Omaha, Nebraska		Castor	W 6–2	7,027	19–9–3 (11–7–3)
February 25	7:00 PM	at #14 Omaha	#6	Baxter Arena • Omaha, Nebraska		Castor	L 2–6	7,802	19–10–3 (11–8–3)
March 3	7:30 PM	Minnesota Duluth	#6	Herb Brooks National Hockey Center • St. Cloud, Minnesota	FOX 9+	Castor	L 3–4	-	19–11–3 (11–9–3)
March 4	6:00 PM	Minnesota Duluth	#6	Herb Brooks National Hockey Center • St. Cloud, Minnesota	FOX 9+	Basse	W 4–3 ^{OT}	5,636	20–11–3 (12–9–3)
NCHC Tournament
March 10	6:30 PM	Minnesota Duluth*	#8	Herb Brooks National Hockey Center • St. Cloud, Minnesota (Quarterfinal Game 1)	FOX 9+	Basse	W 3–1	2,620	21–11–3
March 11	5:00 PM	Minnesota Duluth*	#8	Herb Brooks National Hockey Center • St. Cloud, Minnesota (Quarterfinal Game 2)	FOX 9+	Basse	L 1–5	-	21–12–3
March 12	5:00 PM	Minnesota Duluth*	#8	Herb Brooks National Hockey Center • St. Cloud, Minnesota (Quarterfinal Game 3)	FOX 9+	Castor	W 3–1	-	22–12–3
March 17	7:30 PM	vs. #17 North Dakota*	#7	Xcel Energy Center • Saint Paul, Minnesota (Semifinal)	CBSSN	Castor	W 3–2	10,242	23–12–3
March 18	7:30 PM	vs. Colorado College*	#7	Xcel Energy Center • Saint Paul, Minnesota (Championship)	CBSSN	Castor	W 3–0	6,877	24–12–3
NCAA Tournament
March 23	4:00 PM	vs. #10 Minnesota State*	#6	Scheels Arena • Fargo, North Dakota (West Regional Semifinal)	ESPNU	Castor	W 4–0	5,061	25–12–3
March 25	6:30 PM	vs. #1 Minnesota*	#6	Scheels Arena • Fargo, North Dakota (West Regional Final)	ESPNU	Castor	L 1–4	5,326	25–13–3
*Non-conference game. ^{#}Rankings from USCHO.com Poll. All times are in Central Time. Source:

== Scoring statistics ==
Name	Position	Games	Goals	Assists	Points	PIM
Jami Krannila	C	41	21	19	40	43
Grant Cruikshank	C	41	23	15	38	16
Zach Okabe	RW	41	18	18	36	24
Veeti Miettinen	RW	41	12	24	36	0
Kyler Kupka	F	35	10	15	25	10
Dylan Anhorn	D	23	5	25	25	12
Jack Peart	D	39	3	21	24	24
Adam Ingram	C	41	8	15	23	20
Micah Miller	C/RW	41	5	12	17	18
Aidan Spellacy	F	35	4	8	12	11
Brendan Bushy	D	41	3	8	11	33
Ondřej Trejbal	D	38	0	11	11	12
Josh Luedtke	D	32	2	8	10	48
Spencer Meier	D	32	3	6	9	2
Jack Rogers	F	34	3	5	8	14
Chase Brand	C	24	3	4	7	11
Mason Salquist	F	40	3	4	7	10
Joe Molenaar	F	30	2	5	7	4
Cooper Wylie	D	30	2	5	7	10
Grant Ahcan	F	19	2	3	5	10
Ryan Rosborough	F	19	0	3	3	0
Ethan Aucoin	F	12	1	0	1	19
Dominic Basse	G	19	0	1	1	2
Brady Ziemer	D	22	0	0	0	12
Jaxon Castor	G	23	0	0	0	0
Mason Reiners	D	28	0	0	0	6
Total			133	230	363	371

== Goaltending statistics ==
Name	Games	Minutes	Wins	Losses	Ties	Goals against	Saves	Shut outs	SV %	GAA
Jaxon Castor	23	1368:02	14	8	1	46	557	4	.924	2.02
Dominic Basse	19	1094:09	11	5	2	42	430	3	.911	2.30
Empty Net	-	32:46	-	-	-	7	-	-	-	-
Total	41	2494:57	25	13	3	95	987	7	.912	2.28

== Rankings ==
Poll	Week																											
Poll	Pre	1	2	3	4	5	6	7	8	9	10	11	12	13	14	15	16	17	18	19	20	21	22	23	24	25	26	27 (Final)
USCHO.com	13	-	10	10	8 (1)	2 (14)	4 (6)	4 (5)	4	3 (2)	3 (10)	4 (3)	4	-	4	3 (2)	4 (1)	1 (33)	5	6	6	6	6	8	7	6	-	5
USA Today	13	13	11	10	8	2 (9)	4 (1)	4 (3)	5	3	3 (3)	4	4	4	4	4	4 (1)	1 (21)	5	6	6	6	6	7	7	6	5	5

Note: USCHO did not release a poll in weeks 1, 13, or 26.

== Awards and honors ==
Player	Award	Ref
Jami Krannila	NCHC Defensive Forward of the Year	
Spencer Meier	NCHC Sportsmanship Award	
Jami Krannila	NCHC First Team	
Jack Peart	NCHC Second Team	
Jaxon Castor	NCHC All-Tournament Team	
Jack Peart	NCHC All-Tournament Team	
Jami Krannila	NCHC All-Tournament Team	
Zach Okabe	NCHC All-Tournament Team	

== Players drafted into the NHL ==
=== 2023 NHL entry draft ===
Round	Pick	Player	NHL team
6	179	Warren Clark ^{†}	Tampa Bay Lightning

† incoming freshman
