= E. J. Emery =

American ice hockey player (born 2006)

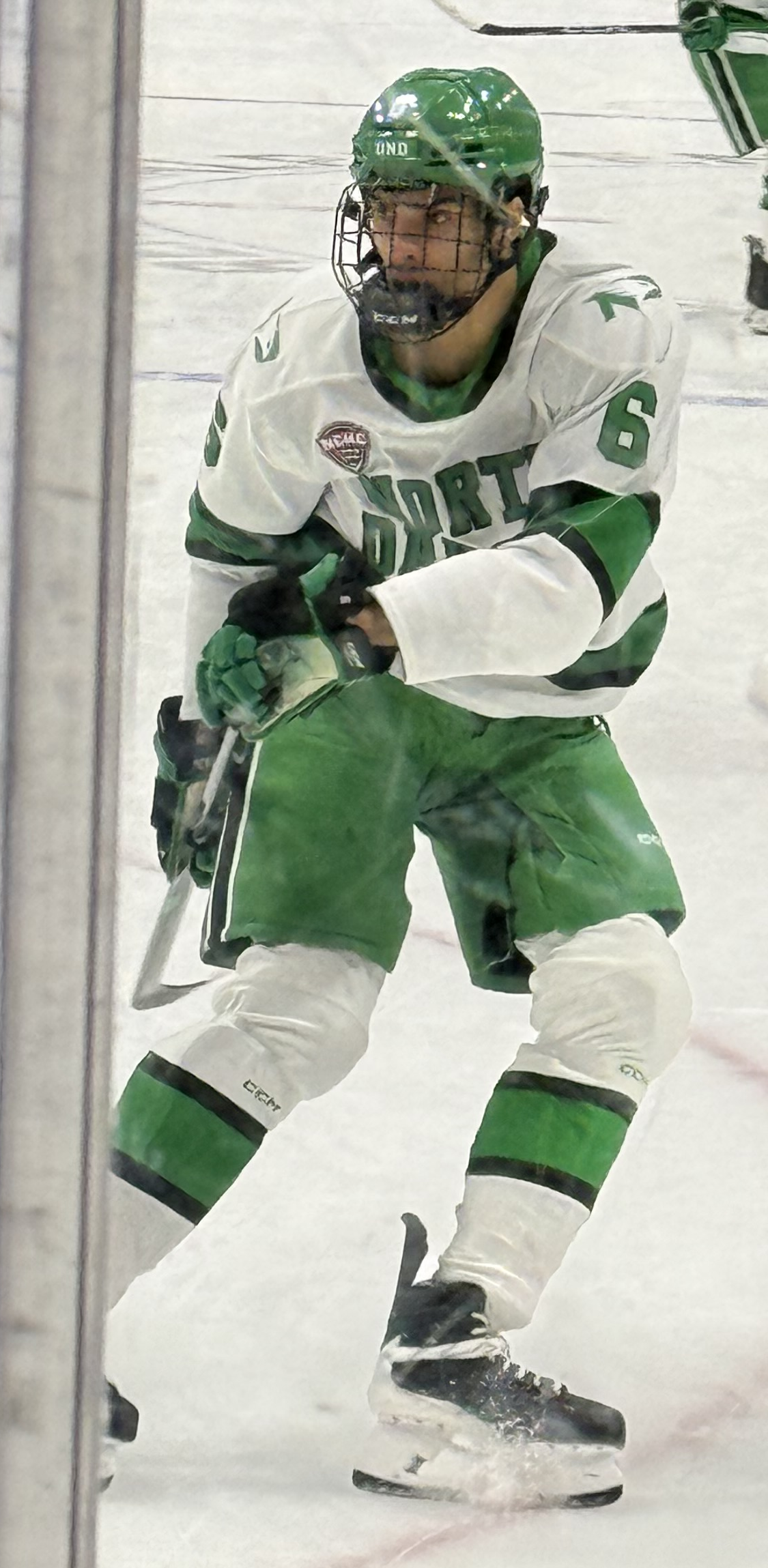
- Emery with North Dakota in 2026
- Born: March 30, 2006 (age 20) Surrey, British Columbia, Canada
- Height: 6 ft 3 in (191 cm)
- Weight: 183 lb (83 kg; 13 st 1 lb)
- Position: Defense
- Shoots: Right
- NCAA team: North Dakota
- NHL draft: 30th overall, 2024; New York Rangers

Eric Emery (born March 30, 2006) is a Canadian-born American ice hockey defenseman for North Dakota of the National Collegiate Athletic Association (NCAA). He was drafted 30th overall by the New York Rangers in the 2024 NHL entry draft.

== Playing career ==
In Emery's first year with the U.S. National Development Team (NTDP), he recorded two goals and ten assists in 60 games with the under-17 team. During the 2022–23 season, he recorded one goal and eight assists in 39 games. In his draft-eligible year, he recorded 16 assists in 61 games with the under-18 team. During the 2023–24 season, he recorded six assists in 27 games.

He was drafted 30th overall by the New York Rangers in the 2024 NHL entry draft. He may have fallen as low as he did because of a lack of scoring, but NTDP under-17 head coach Nick Fohr compared him to Ranger defenseman K'Andre Miller saying:

I coached both of those guys,. K’Andre has a bigger frame to him and is a little bit more put together, especially now...But EJ has similar assets and similar attributes as far as his ability to skate, how long he is, how well he plays the rush and can kill penalties and can transition pucks. So, from a visual perspective, that's really the simplest, easiest way to look at it...He was in situations to defend (with USNTDP). He was in situations to support his teammates and be solid and predictable – to help bring his teammates along and help their development. I always look at the NHL guys that are doing the scouting and say, "Listen, you go ahead and read into the points all you want. Go ahead. Just make sure you take into account what we're asking him to do."

Prior to the 2024–25 season, USA Today writer Vincent Z. Mercogliano rated him as the Rangers 3rd best prospect, praising his reach and mobility. McKeen's Hockey also rated him as the Rangers' 3rd best prospect, praising his size and athleticism, and noting that although they do not expect him to become a big point producer, he is "a potential defensive workhorse with his ability to smother opposing forwards" and in the past year he improved his offensive game. He only recorded one assist and did not score a goal in his freshman season with North Dakota, leading The Athletic writer Corey Pronman to question his ability to make good enough outlet passes.

Despite the lack of freshman production, prior to the 2025–26 season, Mercogliano and Peter Baugh of The Athletic rated Emery as the Rangers' 5th best prospect. Hockey News writer Stan Fischler also rated him as the Rangers' 5th best prospect.

== International play ==
Medal record

Representing United States

Ice hockey

World U18 Championships
Silver medal – second place	2024 Finland	

Emery represented the United States at the 2022 World U-17 Hockey Challenge where he recorded one goal and one assist in seven games and won a gold medal.

He represented the United States at the 2024 IIHF World U18 Championships, where he recorded six assists in seven games and won a silver medal.

On December 24, 2025, Emery was named to the United States men's national junior ice hockey team to compete at the 2026 World Junior Ice Hockey Championships.

== Personal life ==
Emery has dual-citizenship and was raised in Surrey, British Columbia. His mother, Claire, is Canadian while his father, Eric, is American. His father was a Canadian football linebacker for the BC Lions, Calgary Stampeders and Ottawa Rough Riders from 1985 to 1987.

== Career statistics ==
=== Regular season and playoffs ===
			Regular season					Playoffs
Season	Team	League	GP	G	A	Pts	PIM	GP	G	A	Pts	PIM
2022–23	U.S. National Development Team	USHL	39	1	8	9	22	3	0	1	1	0
2023–24	U.S. National Development Team	USHL	27	0	6	6	30	—	—	—	—	—
2024–25	University of North Dakota	NCHC	31	0	1	1	40	—	—	—	—	—
2025–26	University of North Dakota	NCHC	38	3	10	13	32	—	—	—	—	—
2026-27	University of North Dakota	NCHC	4	1	1	2	2
NCAA totals			69	3	11	14	72	—	—	—	—	—

=== International ===
Year	Team	Event	Result	GP	G	A	Pts	PIM
2022	United States	U17	1st place, gold medalist(s)	7	1	1	2	4
2024	United States	U18	2nd place, silver medalist(s)	7	0	6	6	0
2026	United States	WJC	5th	4	0	0	0	0
Junior totals				18	1	7	8	4

Awards and achievements
Preceded by Gabe Perreault	New York Rangers first-round draft pick 2024	Succeeded by Alberts Šmits
