= Denver–North Dakota men's ice hockey rivalry =

U.S. college ice hockey rivalry

- Denver Pioneers North Dakota Fighting Hawks
- Sport: Ice hockey
- First meeting: February 1, 1950; North Dakota 18, Denver 3
- Latest meeting: January 17, 2026; Denver 3, North Dakota 2
- Next meeting: December 4, 2026
- Stadiums: Magness Arena; Ralph Engelstad Arena

Statistics
- Total meetings: 316
- All-time series: North Dakota, 162–138–16 (.538)
- Largest victory: North Dakota, 18–3 (February 1, 1950)
- Longest win streak: North Dakota, 10 (November 21, 1997 – December 10, 1999)
- Current win streak: Denver, 1 (January 17, 2026 – present)

Locations of Denver and North Dakota

The Denver–North Dakota men's ice hockey rivalry is a college ice hockey rivalry between the Denver Pioneers men's ice hockey and North Dakota Fighting Hawks men's ice hockey programs. The first meeting between the two occurred on February 1, 1950. The series is North Dakota's most-played, and for Denver is second only to their rivalry with Colorado College. The two programs have met in the national championship game on four occasions with Denver holding 3–1 edge.

== History ==
North Dakota founded their ice hockey team in the late 1920s. However, due to the Great Depression, the program was shuttered for most of the 1930s. The then-Fighting Sioux returned in full after World War II and were one of only a handful of teams west of the Appalachians. In 1949, Denver joined in with a team of their own and the two became founding members of the MCHL two years later. With the exception of 1959, the two have remained conference rivals since and are typically regarded as two of the top programs in college ice hockey. As of 2024, Denver has the most national titles (10), with Michigan (9) and North Dakota (8) not far behind. Additionally, the two have met in the final game on four separate occasions (1958, 1963, 1968, 2005) which is also tied for the most common championship rematch in NCAA history.

== Game results ==
Full game results for the rivalry, with rankings beginning in the 1998–99 season.

Denver victories	North Dakota victories	Tie games

No.	Date	Location	Winning team		Losing team		Notes
1	February 1, 1950	DU Arena; Denver, CO	North Dakota	18	Denver	3	
2	February 19, 1952	DU Arena; Denver, CO	North Dakota	5	Denver	4	MCHL play begins
3	February 20, 1952	DU Arena; Denver, CO	Denver	6	North Dakota	0	
4	January 9, 1953	Winter Sports Building; Grand Forks, ND	North Dakota	4	Denver	3	
5	January 10, 1953	Winter Sports Building; Grand Forks, ND	North Dakota	4	Denver	3	
6	December 25, 1953	DU Arena; Denver, CO	North Dakota	9	Denver	5	
7	December 26, 1953	DU Arena; Denver, CO	North Dakota	7	Denver	2	
8	December 13, 1954	Winter Sports Building; Grand Forks, ND	Denver	8	North Dakota	4	MCHL changes name to WIHL
9	December 14, 1954	Winter Sports Building; Grand Forks, ND	North Dakota	4	Denver	3	
10	February 5, 1955	DU Arena; Denver, CO	Denver	9	North Dakota	2	
11	February 7, 1955	DU Arena; Denver, CO	Denver	7	North Dakota	1	
12	January 5, 1956	DU Arena; Denver, CO	Denver	6	North Dakota	3	
13	January 7, 1956	DU Arena; Denver, CO	Denver	3	North Dakota	1	
14	February 6, 1956	Winter Sports Building; Grand Forks, ND	North Dakota	6	Denver	2	
15	February 7, 1956	Winter Sports Building; Grand Forks, ND	North Dakota	8	Denver	6	
16	January 18, 1957	Winter Sports Building; Grand Forks, ND	North Dakota	2	Denver	1	
17	January 19, 1957	Winter Sports Building; Grand Forks, ND	North Dakota	7	Denver	1	
18	February 22, 1957	DU Arena; Denver, CO	North Dakota	5	Denver	2	
19	February 23, 1957	DU Arena; Denver, CO	Denver	3	North Dakota	1	
20	January 18, 1958	Winter Sports Building; Grand Forks, ND	North Dakota	9	Denver	0	
21	January 19, 1958	Winter Sports Building; Grand Forks, ND	North Dakota	2	Denver	1	
22	February 22, 1958	DU Arena; Denver, CO	Denver	4	North Dakota	3	
23	February 23, 1958	DU Arena; Denver, CO	North Dakota	4	Denver	1	
24	March 15, 1958	Williams Arena; Minneapolis, MN	Denver	6	North Dakota	2	NCAA national championship
25	December 15, 1958	Winter Sports Building; Grand Forks, ND	North Dakota	4	Denver	3	(OT); WIHL play ends
26	December 16, 1958	Winter Sports Building; Grand Forks, ND	North Dakota	4	Denver	3	
27	February 27, 1959	DU Arena; Denver, CO	North Dakota	6	Denver	4	
28	February 28, 1959	DU Arena; Denver, CO	Denver	6	North Dakota	2	
29	December 11, 1959	Winter Sports Building; Grand Forks, ND	Denver	6	North Dakota	3	WCHA play begins
30	December 12, 1959	Winter Sports Building; Grand Forks, ND	Denver	5	North Dakota	2	
31	February 22, 1960	DU Arena; Denver, CO	North Dakota	6	Denver	5	
32	February 23, 1960	DU Arena; Denver, CO	Denver	8	North Dakota	1	
33	December 11, 1960	Winter Sports Building; Grand Forks, ND	Denver	7	North Dakota	2	
34	December 12, 1960	Winter Sports Building; Grand Forks, ND	Denver	5	North Dakota	1	
35	February 22, 1961	DU Arena; Denver, CO	Denver	15	North Dakota	1	
36	February 23, 1961	DU Arena; Denver, CO	Denver	6	North Dakota	2	
37	January 5, 1962	DU Arena; Denver, CO	Denver	4	North Dakota	3	
38	January 6, 1962	DU Arena; Denver, CO	Denver	3	North Dakota	0	
39	January 12, 1962	Winter Sports Building; Grand Forks, ND	North Dakota	4	Denver	2	
40	January 13, 1962	Winter Sports Building; Grand Forks, ND	Denver	5	North Dakota	4	(OT)
41	January 25, 1963	Winter Sports Building; Grand Forks, ND	North Dakota	7	Denver	4	
42	January 26, 1963	Winter Sports Building; Grand Forks, ND	North Dakota	3	Denver	1	
43	February 12, 1963	DU Arena; Denver, CO	Denver	3	North Dakota	1	
44	February 15, 1963	DU Arena; Denver, CO	Denver	3	North Dakota	2	
45	March 9, 1963	DU Arena; Denver, CO	Denver	5	North Dakota	4	(OT); WCHA championship
46	March 16, 1963	McHugh Forum; Chestnut Hill, MA	North Dakota	6	Denver	5	NCAA national championship
47	December 7, 1963	Winter Sports Building; Grand Forks, ND	Tie	1	Tie	1	(OT)
48	December 9, 1963	Winter Sports Building; Grand Forks, ND	Denver	6	North Dakota	1	
49	January 31, 1964	DU Arena; Denver, CO	Denver	2	North Dakota	1	
50	February 1, 1964	DU Arena; Denver, CO	Denver	4	North Dakota	2	
51	March 12, 1964	DU Arena; Denver, CO	Denver	6	North Dakota	2	WCHA semifinal game 1
52	March 13, 1964	DU Arena; Denver, CO	Tie	3	Tie	3	(OT); WCHA semifinal game 2
53	January 15, 1965	Winter Sports Building; Grand Forks, ND	North Dakota	4	Denver	2	
54	January 16, 1965	Winter Sports Building; Grand Forks, ND	North Dakota	5	Denver	4	
55	February 17, 1965	DU Arena; Denver, CO	Denver	5	North Dakota	4	
56	February 19, 1965	DU Arena; Denver, CO	North Dakota	5	Denver	3	
57	December 17, 1965	DU Arena; Denver, CO	North Dakota	4	Denver	3	
58	December 18, 1965	DU Arena; Denver, CO	North Dakota	4	Denver	3	
59	February 25, 1966	Winter Sports Building; Grand Forks, ND	Denver	7	North Dakota	2	
60	February 26, 1966	Winter Sports Building; Grand Forks, ND	North Dakota	9	Denver	1	
61	March 5, 1966	DU Arena; Denver, CO	Denver	5	North Dakota	4	(OT); WCHA second round
62	December 9, 1966	Winter Sports Building; Grand Forks, ND	North Dakota	5	Denver	3	
63	December 10, 1966	Winter Sports Building; Grand Forks, ND	Denver	4	North Dakota	2	
64	February 1, 1967	DU Arena; Denver, CO	North Dakota	4	Denver	3	
65	February 3, 1967	DU Arena; Denver, CO	Denver	9	North Dakota	4	
66	March 5, 1967	DU Arena; Denver, CO	North Dakota	3	Denver	2	WCHA second round
67	November 17, 1967	Winter Sports Building; Grand Forks, ND	Denver	5	North Dakota	1	
68	November 18, 1967	Winter Sports Building; Grand Forks, ND	North Dakota	3	Denver	1	
69	February 17, 1968	DU Arena; Denver, CO	Denver	7	North Dakota	0	
70	February 19, 1968	DU Arena; Denver, CO	Denver	8	North Dakota	2	
71	March 16, 1968	Duluth Arena Auditorium; Duluth, MN	Denver	4	North Dakota	0	NCAA national championship
72	November 15, 1968	Winter Sports Building; Grand Forks, ND	North Dakota	4	Denver	3	
73	November 16, 1968	Winter Sports Building; Grand Forks, ND	North Dakota	7	Denver	5	
74	February 4, 1969	DU Arena; Denver, CO	Denver	6	North Dakota	0	
75	February 7, 1969	DU Arena; Denver, CO	Denver	4	North Dakota	3	
76	November 15, 1969	Winter Sports Building; Grand Forks, ND	North Dakota	3	Denver	2	(OT)
77	November 16, 1969	Winter Sports Building; Grand Forks, ND	North Dakota	2	Denver	1	(OT)
78	February 4, 1970	DU Arena; Denver, CO	Denver	6	North Dakota	2	
79	February 7, 1970	DU Arena; Denver, CO	North Dakota	6	Denver	5	
80	December 4, 1970	Winter Sports Building; Grand Forks, ND	Denver	4	North Dakota	2	
81	December 5, 1970	Winter Sports Building; Grand Forks, ND	North Dakota	10	Denver	4	
82	January 1, 1971	DU Arena; Denver, CO	North Dakota	6	Denver	3	
83	January 2, 1971	DU Arena; Denver, CO	Denver	7	North Dakota	6	
84	December 3, 1971	Winter Sports Building; Grand Forks, ND	North Dakota	8	Denver	4	
85	December 4, 1971	Winter Sports Building; Grand Forks, ND	North Dakota	5	Denver	3	
86	February 4, 1972	DU Arena; Denver, CO	North Dakota	4	Denver	3	(OT)
87	February 5, 1972	DU Arena; Denver, CO	Denver	7	North Dakota	3	
88	December 2, 1972	Denver Coliseum; Denver, CO	North Dakota	5	Denver	4	
89	December 3, 1972	Denver Coliseum; Denver, CO	Denver	6	North Dakota	1	
90	January 19, 1973	Winter Sports Center; Grand Forks, ND	Denver	10	North Dakota	5	
91	January 20, 1973	Winter Sports Center; Grand Forks, ND	Denver	5	North Dakota	3	
92	January 19, 1973	Winter Sports Center; Grand Forks, ND	North Dakota	5	Denver	4	(OT)
93	January 20, 1973	Winter Sports Center; Grand Forks, ND	Denver	3	North Dakota	0	
94	February 8, 1974	DU Arena; Denver, CO	Denver	4	North Dakota	1	
95	February 9, 1974	DU Arena; Denver, CO	Denver	8	North Dakota	2	
96	November 1, 1974	Winter Sports Center; Grand Forks, ND	Denver	5	North Dakota	4	
97	November 2, 1974	Winter Sports Center; Grand Forks, ND	North Dakota	4	Denver	2	
98	January 10, 1975	DU Arena; Denver, CO	Denver	8	North Dakota	4	
99	January 11, 1975	DU Arena; Denver, CO	North Dakota	5	Denver	4	
100	January 23, 1976	DU Arena; Denver, CO	Denver	8	North Dakota	4	
101	January 24, 1976	DU Arena; Denver, CO	Denver	7	North Dakota	2	
102	February 27, 1976	Winter Sports Center; Grand Forks, ND	North Dakota	4	Denver	2	
103	February 28, 1976	Winter Sports Center; Grand Forks, ND	Denver	7	North Dakota	6	(OT)
104	October 29, 1976	Winter Sports Center; Grand Forks, ND	North Dakota	4	Denver	2	
105	October 30, 1976	Winter Sports Center; Grand Forks, ND	North Dakota	4	Denver	2	
106	February 4, 1977	DU Arena; Denver, CO	Denver	5	North Dakota	2	
107	February 5, 1977	DU Arena; Denver, CO	Denver	4	North Dakota	3	
108	March 9, 1977	DU Arena; Denver, CO	Denver	8	North Dakota	3	WCHA first round game 1
109	March 10, 1977	DU Arena; Denver, CO	Denver	7	North Dakota	2	WCHA first round game 2
110	December 2, 1977	DU Arena; Denver, CO	Denver	10	North Dakota	3	
111	December 3, 1977	DU Arena; Denver, CO	Denver	8	North Dakota	3	
112	January 6, 1978	Winter Sports Center; Grand Forks, ND	North Dakota	8	Denver	6	
113	January 7, 1978	Winter Sports Center; Grand Forks, ND	Denver	4	North Dakota	3	
114	December 1, 1978	Winter Sports Center; Grand Forks, ND	North Dakota	7	Denver	3	
115	December 2, 1978	Winter Sports Center; Grand Forks, ND	North Dakota	8	Denver	5	
116	January 12, 1979	DU Arena; Denver, CO	Denver	5	North Dakota	4	
117	January 13, 1979	DU Arena; Denver, CO	North Dakota	11	Denver	5	
118	November 2, 1979	DU Arena; Denver, CO	North Dakota	4	Denver	3	
119	November 3, 1979	DU Arena; Denver, CO	North Dakota	3	Denver	0	
120	February 6, 1980	Winter Sports Center; Grand Forks, ND	North Dakota	7	Denver	1	
121	February 7, 1980	Winter Sports Center; Grand Forks, ND	North Dakota	5	Denver	2	
122	January 9, 1981	Winter Sports Center; Grand Forks, ND	Tie	4	Tie	4	(OT)
123	January 10, 1981	Winter Sports Center; Grand Forks, ND	North Dakota	8	Denver	6	
124	February 13, 1981	DU Arena; Denver, CO	North Dakota	5	Denver	2	
125	February 14, 1981	DU Arena; Denver, CO	Denver	3	North Dakota	2	
126	November 27, 1981	Winter Sports Center; Grand Forks, ND	North Dakota	6	Denver	3	
127	November 28, 1981	Winter Sports Center; Grand Forks, ND	Denver	7	North Dakota	3	
128	January 8, 1982	Winter Sports Center; Grand Forks, ND	North Dakota	6	Denver	4	
129	January 9, 1982	Winter Sports Center; Grand Forks, ND	North Dakota	5	Denver	4	
130	February 13, 1982	DU Arena; Denver, CO	North Dakota	8	Denver	4	
131	February 14, 1982	DU Arena; Denver, CO	Denver	4	North Dakota	3	
132	March 9, 1982	Winter Sports Center; Grand Forks, ND	North Dakota	4	Denver	3	WCHA semifinal game 1
133	March 10, 1982	Winter Sports Center; Grand Forks, ND	North Dakota	5	Denver	2	WCHA semifinal game 2
134	November 5, 1982	DU Arena; Denver, CO	Denver	4	North Dakota	2	
135	November 6, 1982	DU Arena; Denver, CO	North Dakota	7	Denver	5	
136	December 10, 1982	DU Arena; Denver, CO	North Dakota	7	Denver	2	
137	December 11, 1982	DU Arena; Denver, CO	North Dakota	4	Denver	1	
138	January 7, 1983	Winter Sports Center; Grand Forks, ND	North Dakota	7	Denver	2	
139	January 8, 1983	Winter Sports Center; Grand Forks, ND	North Dakota	7	Denver	2	
140	November 11, 1983	Winter Sports Center; Grand Forks, ND	North Dakota	9	Denver	0	
141	November 12, 1983	Winter Sports Center; Grand Forks, ND	North Dakota	4	Denver	3	(OT)
142	December 2, 1983	DU Arena; Denver, CO	Denver	3	North Dakota	2	
143	December 3, 1983	DU Arena; Denver, CO	North Dakota	6	Denver	2	
144	January 13, 1984	Winter Sports Center; Grand Forks, ND	North Dakota	6	Denver	5	
145	January 14, 1984	Winter Sports Center; Grand Forks, ND	North Dakota	7	Denver	6	(OT)
146	November 2, 1984	DU Arena; Denver, CO	North Dakota	5	Denver	4	(OT)
147	November 3, 1984	DU Arena; Denver, CO	Tie	4	Tie	4	(OT)
148	February 8, 1985	Winter Sports Center; Grand Forks, ND	Denver	4	North Dakota	3	(OT)
149	February 9, 1985	Winter Sports Center; Grand Forks, ND	Denver	6	North Dakota	4	
150	March 1, 1985	Winter Sports Center; Grand Forks, ND	North Dakota	7	Denver	1	WCHA quarterfinal game 1
151	March 2, 1985	Winter Sports Center; Grand Forks, ND	North Dakota	8	Denver	4	WCHA quarterfinal game 2
152	February 7, 1986	DU Arena; Denver, CO	Denver	6	North Dakota	3	
153	February 8, 1986	DU Arena; Denver, CO	North Dakota	7	Denver	3	
154	October 17, 1986	DU Arena; Denver, CO	North Dakota	5	Denver	2	
155	October 18, 1986	DU Arena; Denver, CO	North Dakota	11	Denver	5	
156	February 13, 1987	Winter Sports Center; Grand Forks, ND	North Dakota	4	Denver	1	
157	February 14, 1987	Winter Sports Center; Grand Forks, ND	North Dakota	5	Denver	2	
158	November 20, 1987	DU Arena; Denver, CO	North Dakota	5	Denver	4	
159	November 21, 1987	DU Arena; Denver, CO	Denver	4	North Dakota	2	
160	January 22, 1988	Winter Sports Center; Grand Forks, ND	Denver	4	North Dakota	3	(OT)
161	January 23, 1988	Winter Sports Center; Grand Forks, ND	North Dakota	4	Denver	2	
162	November 26, 1988	Ralph Engelstad Arena; Grand Forks, ND	Denver	6	North Dakota	4	
163	November 27, 1988	Ralph Engelstad Arena; Grand Forks, ND	Denver	5	North Dakota	3	
164	December 9, 1988	DU Arena; Denver, CO	Denver	7	North Dakota	6	(OT)
165	December 10, 1988	DU Arena; Denver, CO	North Dakota	3	Denver	2	
166	February 25, 1989	Ralph Engelstad Arena; Grand Forks, ND	North Dakota	7	Denver	1	WCHA quarterfinal game 1
167	February 26, 1989	Ralph Engelstad Arena; Grand Forks, ND	Denver	5	North Dakota	4	WCHA quarterfinal game 2
168	February 27, 1989	Ralph Engelstad Arena; Grand Forks, ND	Denver	3	North Dakota	2	WCHA quarterfinal game 3
169	November 17, 1989	DU Arena; Denver, CO	Denver	5	North Dakota	3	
170	November 18, 1989	DU Arena; Denver, CO	North Dakota	8	Denver	3	
171	December 15, 1989	Ralph Engelstad Arena; Grand Forks, ND	Denver	9	North Dakota	8	
172	December 16, 1989	Ralph Engelstad Arena; Grand Forks, ND	Denver	4	North Dakota	3	
173	October 12, 1990	Ralph Engelstad Arena; Grand Forks, ND	North Dakota	5	Denver	3	
174	October 13, 1990	Ralph Engelstad Arena; Grand Forks, ND	North Dakota	8	Denver	1	
175	February 8, 1991	DU Arena; Denver, CO	North Dakota	9	Denver	7	
176	February 9, 1991	DU Arena; Denver, CO	Denver	7	North Dakota	4	
177	October 18, 1991	DU Arena; Denver, CO	North Dakota	10	Denver	5	
178	October 19, 1991	DU Arena; Denver, CO	North Dakota	5	Denver	4	
179	December 6, 1991	Ralph Engelstad Arena; Grand Forks, ND	North Dakota	6	Denver	1	
180	December 7, 1991	Ralph Engelstad Arena; Grand Forks, ND	North Dakota	7	Denver	6	(OT)
181	November 13, 1992	DU Arena; Denver, CO	Denver	7	North Dakota	4	
182	November 14, 1992	DU Arena; Denver, CO	Denver	7	North Dakota	4	
183	February 5, 1993	Ralph Engelstad Arena; Grand Forks, ND	Denver	5	North Dakota	4	
184	February 6, 1993	Ralph Engelstad Arena; Grand Forks, ND	Denver	6	North Dakota	5	(OT)
185	October 29, 1993	Ralph Engelstad Arena; Grand Forks, ND	Denver	7	North Dakota	5	
186	October 30, 1993	Ralph Engelstad Arena; Grand Forks, ND	North Dakota	3	Denver	2	(OT)
187	February 4, 1994	DU Arena; Denver, CO	Denver	3	North Dakota	1	
188	February 5, 1994	DU Arena; Denver, CO	Denver	5	North Dakota	2	
189	November 4, 1994	DU Arena; Denver, CO	North Dakota	6	Denver	4	
190	November 5, 1994	DU Arena; Denver, CO	Denver	7	North Dakota	2	
191	February 10, 1995	Ralph Engelstad Arena; Grand Forks, ND	Denver	4	North Dakota	1	
192	February 11, 1995	Ralph Engelstad Arena; Grand Forks, ND	North Dakota	3	Denver	1	
193	December 15, 1995	Ralph Engelstad Arena; Grand Forks, ND	North Dakota	4	Denver	3	
194	December 16, 1995	Ralph Engelstad Arena; Grand Forks, ND	Denver	6	North Dakota	3	
195	January 20, 1996	DU Arena; Denver, CO	Denver	3	North Dakota	2	
196	January 21, 1996	DU Arena; Denver, CO	Denver	4	North Dakota	3	
197	October 18, 1996	Ralph Engelstad Arena; Grand Forks, ND	North Dakota	3	Denver	2	(OT)
198	October 19, 1996	Ralph Engelstad Arena; Grand Forks, ND	North Dakota	6	Denver	2	
199	February 28, 1997	DU Arena; Denver, CO	Denver	6	North Dakota	3	
200	March 1, 1997	DU Arena; Denver, CO	Denver	5	North Dakota	0	
201	November 21, 1997	Ralph Engelstad Arena; Grand Forks, ND	North Dakota	4	Denver	3	
202	November 22, 1997	Ralph Engelstad Arena; Grand Forks, ND	North Dakota	6	Denver	1	
203	February 21, 1998	Cadet Ice Arena, Colorado Springs, CO	North Dakota	6	Denver	4	
204	February 22, 1998	Cadet Ice Arena, Colorado Springs, CO	North Dakota	7	Denver	3	
205	December 5, 1998	McNichols Sports Arena; Denver, CO	North Dakota	6	Denver	4	
206	December 6, 1998	McNichols Sports Arena; Denver, CO	North Dakota	5	Denver	3	
207	February 12, 1999	Ralph Engelstad Arena; Grand Forks, ND	North Dakota	7	Denver	3	
208	February 13, 1999	Ralph Engelstad Arena; Grand Forks, ND	North Dakota	11	Denver	4	
209	March 20, 1999	Target Center; Minneapolis, MN	North Dakota	7	Denver	1	WCHA championship
210	December 10, 1999	Ralph Engelstad Arena; Grand Forks, ND	North Dakota	7	Denver	3	
211	December 11, 1999	Ralph Engelstad Arena; Grand Forks, ND	Denver	7	North Dakota	2	
212	March 10, 2000	Ralph Engelstad Arena; Grand Forks, ND	North Dakota	4	Denver	0	WCHA first round game 1
213	March 11, 2000	Ralph Engelstad Arena; Grand Forks, ND	Denver	2	North Dakota	1	WCHA first round game 2
214	March 12, 2000	Ralph Engelstad Arena; Grand Forks, ND	North Dakota	9	Denver	4	WCHA first round game 3
215	November 3, 2000	Magness Arena; Denver, CO	North Dakota	6	Denver	4	
216	November 4, 2000	Magness Arena; Denver, CO	North Dakota	7	Denver	3	
217	February 16, 2001	Ralph Engelstad Arena; Grand Forks, ND	Tie	3	Tie	3	(OT)
218	February 17, 2001	Ralph Engelstad Arena; Grand Forks, ND	North Dakota	3	Denver	0	
219	March 1, 2002	Ralph Engelstad Arena; Grand Forks, ND	Denver	4	North Dakota	3	(OT)
220	March 2, 2002	Ralph Engelstad Arena; Grand Forks, ND	North Dakota	4	Denver	1	
221	February 14, 2003	Magness Arena; Denver, CO	Tie	3	Tie	3	(OT)
222	February 15, 2003	Magness Arena; Denver, CO	Denver	2	North Dakota	1	
223	March 14, 2003	Ralph Engelstad Arena; Grand Forks, ND	Denver	4	North Dakota	1	WCHA first round game 1
224	March 15, 2003	Ralph Engelstad Arena; Grand Forks, ND	North Dakota	3	Denver	2	(OT); WCHA first round game 2
225	March 16, 2003	Ralph Engelstad Arena; Grand Forks, ND	North Dakota	3	Denver	2	(OT); WCHA first round game 3
226	November 21, 2003	Magness Arena; Denver, CO	North Dakota	8	Denver	2	
227	November 22, 2003	Magness Arena; Denver, CO	North Dakota	6	Denver	2	
228	January 30, 2004	Ralph Engelstad Arena; Grand Forks, ND	North Dakota	6	Denver	1	
229	January 31, 2004	Ralph Engelstad Arena; Grand Forks, ND	Tie	1	Tie	1	(OT)
230	March 14, 2004	World Arena; Colorado Springs, CO	Denver	1	North Dakota	0	NCAA regional final
231	February 4, 2005	Ralph Engelstad Arena; Grand Forks, ND	Denver	4	North Dakota	2	
232	February 5, 2005	Ralph Engelstad Arena; Grand Forks, ND	Denver	4	North Dakota	2	
233	March 18, 2005	Xcel Energy Center; Saint Paul, MN	Denver	2	North Dakota	1	(OT); WCHA semifinal
234	April 9, 2005	Value City Arena; Columbus, OH	Denver	4	North Dakota	1	NCAA national championship
235	October 28, 2005	Ralph Engelstad Arena; Grand Forks, ND	North Dakota	3	Denver	1	
236	October 29, 2005	Ralph Engelstad Arena; Grand Forks, ND	Denver	7	North Dakota	2	
237	February 24, 2006	Magness Arena; Denver, CO	North Dakota	6	Denver	2	
238	February 25, 2006	Magness Arena; Denver, CO	Denver	7	North Dakota	3	
239	February 23, 2007	Magness Arena; Denver, CO	Denver	4	North Dakota	3	(OT)
240	February 24, 2007	Magness Arena; Denver, CO	North Dakota	3	Denver	0	
241	November 30, 2007	Magness Arena; Denver, CO	Denver	1	North Dakota	0	
242	December 1, 2007	Magness Arena; Denver, CO	North Dakota	3	Denver	1	
243	February 15, 2008	Ralph Engelstad Arena; Grand Forks, ND	North Dakota	5	Denver	4	
244	February 16, 2008	Ralph Engelstad Arena; Grand Forks, ND	North Dakota	4	Denver	1	
245	March 21, 2008	Xcel Energy Center; Saint Paul, MN	Denver	3	North Dakota	1	WCHA semifinal
246	January 23, 2009	Ralph Engelstad Arena; Grand Forks, ND	North Dakota	8	Denver	3	
247	January 24, 2009	Ralph Engelstad Arena; Grand Forks, ND	Tie	2	Tie	2	(OT)
248	November 20, 2009	Magness Arena; Denver, CO	Denver	1	North Dakota	0	
249	November 21, 2009	Magness Arena; Denver, CO	Denver	3	North Dakota	2	
250	January 15, 2010	Ralph Engelstad Arena; Grand Forks, ND	Denver	2	North Dakota	0	
251	January 16, 2010	Ralph Engelstad Arena; Grand Forks, ND	Denver	4	North Dakota	2	
252	March 19, 2010	Xcel Energy Center; Saint Paul, MN	North Dakota	4	Denver	3	WCHA semifinal
253	October 29, 2010	Ralph Engelstad Arena; Grand Forks, ND	North Dakota	4	Denver	3	
254	October 30, 2010	Ralph Engelstad Arena; Grand Forks, ND	Denver	3	North Dakota	0	
255	March 19, 2011	Xcel Energy Center; Saint Paul, MN	North Dakota	3	Denver	2	(2OT); WCHA championship
256	March 27, 2011	Resch Center; Green Bay, WI	North Dakota	6	Denver	1	NCAA regional final
257	February 24, 2012	Magness Arena; Denver, CO	North Dakota	4	Denver	3	
258	February 25, 2012	Magness Arena; Denver, CO	Denver	5	North Dakota	3	
259	March 17, 2012	Xcel Energy Center; Saint Paul, MN	North Dakota	4	Denver	0	WCHA championship
260	December 7, 2012	Ralph Engelstad Arena; Grand Forks, ND	Tie	2	Tie	2	(OT)
261	December 8, 2012	Ralph Engelstad Arena; Grand Forks, ND	North Dakota	6	Denver	3	
262	February 22, 2013	Magness Arena; Denver, CO	Denver	5	North Dakota	4	
263	February 23, 2013	Magness Arena; Denver, CO	North Dakota	6	Denver	1	WCHA play ends
264	January 24, 2014	Magness Arena; Denver, CO	North Dakota	4	Denver	2	NCHC play begins
265	January 25, 2014	Magness Arena; Denver, CO	Denver	3	North Dakota	0	
266	December 12, 2014	Magness Arena; Denver, CO	Denver	4	North Dakota	1	
267	December 13, 2014	Magness Arena; Denver, CO	North Dakota	3	Denver	1	
268	February 13, 2015	Ralph Engelstad Arena; Grand Forks, ND	North Dakota	4	Denver	2	
269	February 14, 2015	Ralph Engelstad Arena; Grand Forks, ND	Tie	3	Tie	3	(OT)
270	March 21, 2015	Target Center; Minneapolis, MN	Denver	5	North Dakota	1	NCHC third place game
271	December 4, 2015	Ralph Engelstad Arena; Grand Forks, ND	North Dakota	5	Denver	1	
272	December 5, 2015	Ralph Engelstad Arena; Grand Forks, ND	North Dakota	4	Denver	0	
273	February 12, 2016	Magness Arena; Denver, CO	Denver	6	North Dakota	4	
274	February 13, 2016	Magness Arena; Denver, CO	Denver	4	North Dakota	1	
275	March 19, 2016	Target Center; Minneapolis, MN	Tie	1	Tie	1	NCHC third place game
276	April 7, 2016	Amalie Arena; Tampa, FL	North Dakota	4	Denver	2	NCAA national semifinal
277	November 11, 2016	Ralph Engelstad Arena; Grand Forks, ND	Tie	1	Tie	1	(OT)
278	November 12, 2016	Ralph Engelstad Arena; Grand Forks, ND	Denver	3	North Dakota	2	
279	March 17, 2017	Target Center; Minneapolis, MN	North Dakota	1	Denver	0	NCHC semifinal
280	November 17, 2017	Magness Arena; Denver, CO	North Dakota	5	Denver	4	
281	November 18, 2017	Magness Arena; Denver, CO	Denver	4	North Dakota	1	
282	January 26, 2018	Ralph Engelstad Arena; Grand Forks, ND	Tie	3	Tie	3	(OT)
283	January 27, 2018	Ralph Engelstad Arena; Grand Forks, ND	Tie	1	Tie	1	(OT)
284	December 7, 2018	Ralph Engelstad Arena; Grand Forks, ND	North Dakota	4	Denver	1	
285	December 8, 2018	Ralph Engelstad Arena; Grand Forks, ND	Denver	2	North Dakota	1	
286	February 1, 2019	Magness Arena; Denver, CO	Denver	2	North Dakota	1	
287	February 2, 2019	Magness Arena; Denver, CO	Tie	1	Tie	1	(OT)
288	March 15, 2019	Magness Arena; Denver, CO	Denver	2	North Dakota	0	NCHC quarterfinal game 1
289	March 16, 2019	Magness Arena; Denver, CO	Denver	4	North Dakota	2	NCHC quarterfinal game 2
290	November 15, 2019	Magness Arena; Denver, CO	Tie	1	Tie	1	(OT)
291	November 16, 2019	Magness Arena; Denver, CO	North Dakota	4	Denver	1	
292	February 14, 2020	Ralph Engelstad Arena; Grand Forks, ND	North Dakota	4	Denver	1	
293	February 15, 2020	Ralph Engelstad Arena; Grand Forks, ND	North Dakota	3	Denver	1	
294	December 4, 2020	Baxter Arena; Omaha, NE	North Dakota	4	Denver	3	(OT)
295	December 8, 2020	Baxter Arena; Omaha, NE	Denver	3	North Dakota	2	
296	January 17, 2021	Magness Arena; Denver, CO	Denver	4	North Dakota	1	
297	January 18, 2021	Magness Arena; Denver, CO	North Dakota	5	Denver	1	
298	February 12, 2021	Ralph Engelstad Arena; Grand Forks, ND	North Dakota	3	Denver	0	
299	February 13, 2021	Ralph Engelstad Arena; Grand Forks, ND	North Dakota	5	Denver	2	
300	March 15, 2021	Ralph Engelstad Arena; Grand Forks, ND	North Dakota	2	Denver	1	(OT); NCHC semifinal
301	November 5, 2021	Ralph Engelstad Arena; Grand Forks, ND	North Dakota	3	Denver	1	
302	November 6, 2021	Ralph Engelstad Arena; Grand Forks, ND	North Dakota	4	Denver	1	
303	November 11, 2022	Ralph Engelstad Arena; Grand Forks, ND	Denver	3	North Dakota	2	
304	November 12, 2022	Ralph Engelstad Arena; Grand Forks, ND	Denver	6	North Dakota	3	
305	February 10, 2023	Magness Arena; Denver, CO	Denver	5	North Dakota	3	
306	February 11, 2023	Magness Arena; Denver, CO	Denver	5	North Dakota	2	
307	December 1, 2023	Magness Arena; Denver, CO	North Dakota	7	Denver	5	
308	December 2, 2023	Magness Arena; Denver, CO	Denver	3	North Dakota	2	(OT)
309	January 26, 2024	Ralph Engelstad Arena; Grand Forks, ND	North Dakota	5	Denver	2	
310	January 27, 2024	Ralph Engelstad Arena; Grand Forks, ND	North Dakota	4	Denver	2	
311	November 15, 2024	Ralph Engelstad Arena; Grand Forks, ND	Denver	5	North Dakota	2	
312	November 16, 2024	Ralph Engelstad Arena; Grand Forks, ND	Denver	3	North Dakota	2	
313	February 14, 2025	Magness Arena; Denver, CO	Denver	4	North Dakota	0	
314	February 15, 2025	Magness Arena; Denver, CO	North Dakota	3	Denver	1	
315	January 16, 2026	Ralph Engelstad Arena; Grand Forks, ND	North Dakota	5	Denver	0	
316	January 17, 2026	Ralph Engelstad Arena; Grand Forks, ND	Denver	3	North Dakota	2	
Series: North Dakota leads 162–138–16
