= Alaska Anchorage Seawolves men's ice hockey statistical leaders =

The Alaska Anchorage Seawolves men's ice hockey statistical leaders are individual statistical leaders of the Alaska Anchorage Seawolves men's ice hockey program in various categories, including goals, assists, points, and saves. Within those areas, the lists identify single-game, single-season, and career leaders. The Seawolves represent the University of Alaska Anchorage as in independent in the NCAA.

Alaska Anchorage began competing in intercollegiate ice hockey in 1979. Alaska Anchorage last played hockey in the 2019–20 season. Alaska Anchorage intended to play in 2020–21, but canceled its season due to COVID-19 issues, and dropped the sport due to financial fallout from the pandemic. A subsequent fundraising drive was successful enough to lead UAA to reinstate hockey, with play resuming for the 2022–23 season. These lists are updated through the end of the 2019–20 season.

== Goals ==
Career
| Rk | Player | Goals | Seasons |
|---|---|---|---|
| 1 | Rob Conn | 76 | 1988–89 1989–90 1990–91 |
| | Joey Hayse | 76 | 1983–84 1984–85 1985–86 1986–87 |
| 3 | Doug Spooner | 75 | 1987–88 1988–89 1989–90 1990–91 |
| 4 | Derek Donald | 74 | 1988–89 1989–90 1990–91 1991–92 |
| 5 | Bob Madson | 71 | 1982–83 1983–84 1984–85 1985–86 |
| 6 | Dennis Sorenson | 70 | 1980–81 1981–82 1982–83 1983–84 |
| 7 | Mike Hiltner | 63 | 1984–85 1985–86 1986–87 1987–88 |
| | Dean Larson | 63 | 1988–89 1989–90 1990–91 1991–92 |
| 9 | Keith Morris | 61 | 1989–90 1990–91 1991–92 1993–94 |
| 10 | John Hill | 60 | 1979–80 1980–81 1981–82 1982–83 1983–84 |

Season
| Rk | Player | Goals | Season |
|---|---|---|---|
| 1 | Rob Conn | 28 | 1990–91 |
| | Mike Hiltner | 28 | 1987–88 |
| 3 | Rob Conn | 27 | 1989–90 |
| | Joey Hayse | 27 | 1986–87 |
| 5 | Keith Morris | 24 | 1991–92 |
| 6 | Derek Donald | 23 | 1991–92 |
| | Doug Spooner | 23 | 1989–90 |
| | Doug Spooner | 23 | 1988–89 |
| | Kevin Clark | 23 | 2009–10 |
| 10 | Bob Madson | 22 | 1983–84 |
| | Troy Norcross | 22 | 1994–95 |
| | David Vallieres | 22 | 1995–96 |
| | Derek Donald | 22 | 1990–91 |

Single Game
| Rk | Player | Goals | Season | Opponent |
|---|---|---|---|---|
| 1 | Cary Fisher | 5 | 1987–88 | Gustavus Adolphus |

== Assists ==
Career
| Rk | Player | Assists | Seasons |
|---|---|---|---|
| 1 | Dean Larson | 137 | 1988–89 1989–90 1990–91 1991–92 |
| 2 | Dennis Sorenson | 127 | 1980–81 1981–82 1982–83 1983–84 |
| 3 | Peter McEnaney | 107 | 1984–85 1985–86 1986–87 1987–88 |
| 4 | Steve Bogoyevac | 96 | 1988–89 1989–90 1990–91 1991–92 |
| 5 | Joey Hayse | 93 | 1983–84 1984–85 1985–86 1986–87 |
| 6 | Mike Peluso | 92 | 1985–86 1986–87 1987–88 1988–89 |
| 7 | Derek Donald | 91 | 1988–89 1989–90 1990–91 1991–92 |
| 8 | Mark Stitt | 88 | 1991–92 1992–93 1993–94 1994–95 |
| 9 | Cary Fisher | 75 | 1986–87 1987–88 1988–89 1989–90 |
| 10 | Keith Morris | 73 | 1989–90 1990–91 1991–92 1993–94 |
| | Doug Spooner | 73 | 1987–88 1988–89 1989–90 1990–91 |

Season
| Rk | Player | Assists | Season |
|---|---|---|---|
| 1 | Dean Larson | 48 | 1989–90 |
| 2 | Dennis Sorenson | 44 | 1983–84 |
| 3 | Derek Donald | 36 | 1991–92 |
| 4 | Dennis Sorenson | 35 | 1981–82 |
| | Joey Hayse | 35 | 1985–86 |
| | Peter McEnaney | 35 | 1987–88 |
| 7 | Peter McEnaney | 34 | 1986–87 |
| 8 | Dennis Sorenson | 33 | 1982–83 |
| | Brian Kraft | 33 | 1989–90 |
| | Mike Peluso | 33 | 1987–88 |

Single Game
| Rk | Player | Assists | Season | Opponent |
|---|---|---|---|---|
| 1 | Dennis Sorenson | 6 | 1982–83 | Northern Arizona |
| | Doug Spooner | 6 | 1987–88 | Gustavus Adolphus |

== Points ==
Career
| Rk | Player | Points | Seasons |
|---|---|---|---|
| 1 | Dean Larson | 200 | 1988–89 1989–90 1990–91 1991–92 |
| 2 | Dennis Sorenson | 197 | 1980–81 1981–82 1982–83 1983–84 |
| 3 | Joey Hayse | 169 | 1983–84 1984–85 1985–86 1986–87 |
| 4 | Derek Donald | 165 | 1988–89 1989–90 1990–91 1991–92 |
| 5 | Peter McEnaney | 161 | 1984–85 1985–86 1986–87 1987–88 |
| 6 | Doug Spooner | 148 | 1987–88 1988–89 1989–90 1990–91 |
| 7 | Steve Bogoyevac | 146 | 1988–89 1989–90 1990–91 1991–92 |
| | Rob Conn | 146 | 1988–89 1989–90 1990–91 |
| 9 | Keith Morris | 134 | 1989–90 1990–91 1991–92 1993–94 |
| 10 | Mark Stitt | 133 | 1991–92 1992–93 1993–94 1994–95 |

Season
| Rk | Player | Points | Season |
|---|---|---|---|
| 1 | Dean Larson | 66 | 1989–90 |
| 2 | Dennis Sorenson | 63 | 1983–84 |
| 3 | Rob Conn | 60 | 1990–91 |
| 4 | Derek Donald | 59 | 1991–92 |
| 5 | Dennis Sorenson | 53 | 1982–83 |
| | Joey Hayse | 53 | 1986–87 |
| 7 | Peter McEnaney | 52 | 1987–88 |
| 8 | Dennis Sorenson | 51 | 1981–82 |
| 9 | Joey Hayse | 50 | 1985–86 |
| | Doug Spooner | 50 | 1988–89 |
| | Brian Kraft | 50 | 1989–90 |
| | Keith Morris | 50 | 1991–92 |
| | Dean Larson | 50 | 1991–92 |

Single Game
| Rk | Player | Points | Season | Opponent |
|---|---|---|---|---|
| 1 | Doug Spooner | 8 | 1987–88 | Gustavus Adolphus |

== Saves ==
Career
| Rk | Player | Saves | Seasons |
|---|---|---|---|
| 1 | Olivier Mantha | 3449 | 2014–15 2015–16 2016–17 2017–18 |
| 2 | Paul Krake | 2637 | 1988–89 1989–90 1990–91 1991–92 |
| 3 | Chris King | 2321 | 2000–01 2001–02 2002–03 2003–04 |
| 4 | Doug Teskey | 2289 | 1995–96 1996–97 1997–98 1998–99 |
| 5 | Garvin Federenko | 2255 | 1982–83 1983–84 1984–85 1985–86 |
| 6 | Nathan Lawson | 2116 | 2004–05 2005–06 2006–07 |
| 7 | Jon Olthuis | 2046 | 2006–07 2007–08 2008–09 2009–10 |
| 8 | Lee Schill | 1884 | 1992–93 1993–94 1994–95 |
| 9 | Rob Gunderson | 1827 | 2010–11 2011–12 2012–13 2013–14 |
| 10 | Kevin Reiter | 1809 | 2000–01 2001–02 2002–03 2003–04 |

Season
| Rk | Player | Saves | Season |
|---|---|---|---|
| 1 | Paul Krake | 947 | 1990–91 |
| 2 | Olivier Mantha | 946 | 2017–18 |
| 3 | Olivier Mantha | 867 | 2016–17 |
| | Nathan Lawson | 867 | 2004–05 |
| 5 | Garvin Federenko | 850 | 1984–85 |
| 6 | Lee Schill | 842 | 1993–94 |
| 7 | Doug Teskey | 824 | 1996–97 |
| 8 | Olivier Mantha | 820 | 2015–16 |
| 9 | Olivier Mantha | 816 | 2014–15 |
| 10 | Tyler Krivtsov | 793 | 2025–26 |

Single Game
| Rk | Player | Saves | Season | Opponent |
|---|---|---|---|---|
| 1 | John DeCaro | 57 | 2004–05 | Minnesota |
