= List of Alaska Anchorage Seawolves men's ice hockey seasons =

This is a list of seasons completed by the University of Alaska Anchorage men's ice hockey team.

Alaska Anchorage has made three NCAA tournament appearances in its history, all in consecutive years. As of 2018 the Seawolves are the last independent team to receive a bid to the NCAA tournament.

== Season-by-season results ==
NCAA D-I Champions	NCAA Frozen Four	Conference regular season champions	Conference Playoff Champions

Season	Conference	Regular season (Note: Code explanation; GP—Games Played, W—Wins, L—Losses, T—Tied games, 3/SW—Win in 3 on 3 overtime or shootout, Pts—Points*)												Conference Tournament Results	National Tournament Results
Season	Conference	Conference							Overall					Conference Tournament Results	National Tournament Results
Season	Conference	GP	W	L	T	3/SW	Pts*	Finish	GP	W	L	T	%	Conference Tournament Results	National Tournament Results
Division II
Brush Christiansen (1979 — 1996)
1979–80	Independent	–	–	–	–	–	–	–	8	8	0	0	1.000		
1980–81	Independent	–	–	–	–	–	–	–	24	14	10	0	.583		
1981–82	Independent	–	–	–	–	–	–	–	27	15	12	0	.556		
1982–83	Independent	–	–	–	–	–	–	–	28	20	7	1	.732		
1983–84	Independent	–	–	–	–	–	–	–	30	23	6	1	.783		
Division I
1984–85	Independent	–	–	–	–	–	–	–	38	17	21	0	.447		
1985–86	Great West	12	3	8	1	-	7	4th	33	12	20	1	.379		
1986–87	Great West	16	9	6	1	-	19	1st	30	19	9	2	.667		
1987–88	Great West	8	3	5	0	-	6	3rd	36	18	15	3	.542		
1988–89	Independent	–	–	–	–	–	–	–	34	18	13	3	.574		
1989–90	Independent	–	–	–	–	–	–	–	34	21	11	2	.647		Lost Regional semifinal series, 0–2 (Lake Superior State)
1990–91	Independent	–	–	–	–	–	–	–	43	22	17	4	.558		Won First round series, 2–0 (Boston College); Lost Quarterfinal series, 0–2 (Northern Michigan)
1991–92	Independent	–	–	–	–	–	–	–	36	27	8	1	.764		Lost Regional Quarterfinal, 3–7 (Lake Superior State)
1992–93	Independent	–	–	–	–	–	–	–	36	18	13	5	.569		
1993–94	WCHA	32	14	16	2	-	30	6th	36	15	19	2	.444	Lost First round series, 0–2 (Northern Michigan)	
1994–95	WCHA	32	10	22	0	-	20	10th	36	11	25	0	.306	Lost First round series, 0–2 (Colorado College)	
1995–96	WCHA	32	8	25	5	-	20	9th	37	9	23	5	.311	Lost First round series, 0–2 (Minnesota)	
Dean Talafous (1996 — 2001)
1996–97	WCHA	32	7	21	4	-	18	9th	36	9	23	4	.392	Lost First round series, 0–2 (Minnesota)	
1997–98	WCHA	28	5	19	4	-	14	9th	36	6	25	5	.236	Lost First round series, 0–2 (Wisconsin)	
1998–99	WCHA	28	10	13	5	-	25	6th	36	13	18	5	.431	Lost First round series, 0–2 (Minnesota)	
1999–00	WCHA	28	11	14	3	-	25	7th	36	15	18	3	.458	Lost First round series, 0–2 (Minnesota State–Mankato)	
2000–01	WCHA	28	4	20	4	-	12	9th	36	7	24	5	.264	Lost Quarterfinal series, 0–2 (St. Cloud State)	
John Hill (2001 — 2005)
2001–02	WCHA	28	10	14	4	-	24	T–6th	36	12	19	5	.403	Lost Quarterfinal series, 0–2 (Colorado College)	
2002–03	WCHA	28	0	22	6	-	6	10th	36	1	28	7	.125	Lost First round series, 0–2 (Colorado College)	
2003–04	WCHA	28	7	18	3	-	17	8th	40	14	23	3	.388	Won First round series, 2–1 (Wisconsin); Won Quarterfinal, 4–1 (Colorado College); Lost Semifinal, 2–4 (North Dakota); Lost Third Place, 2–4 (Minnesota–Duluth)	
2004–05	WCHA	28	9	15	4	-	22	7th	37	12	19	6	.405	Lost First round series, 1–2 (Wisconsin)	
Dave Shyiak (2005 — 2013)
2005–06	WCHA	28	4	21	3	-	11	10th	36	6	27	3	.208	Lost First round series, 0–2 (Minnesota)	
2006–07	WCHA	28	8	19	1	-	17	10th	37	13	21	3	.392	Lost First round series, 1–2 (Minnesota)	
2007–08	WCHA	28	3	19	6	-	12	10th	36	7	21	8	.306	Lost First round series, 0–2 (Colorado College)	
2008–09	WCHA	28	9	14	5	-	23	9th	36	14	17	5	.458	Lost First round series, 0–2 (Denver)	
2009–10	WCHA	28	9	17	2	-	20	T–8th	36	11	23	2	.333	Lost First round series, 0–2 (Wisconsin)	
2010–11	WCHA	28	12	14	2	-	26	T–8th	37	16	18	3	.473	Won First round series, 2–0 (Minnesota); Lost Quarterfinal, 2–4 (Colorado College)	
2011–12	WCHA	28	5	22	1	-	11	12th	36	9	25	2	.278	Lost First round series, 0–2 (Minnesota)	
2012–13	WCHA	28	2	20	6	-	10	12th	36	4	25	7	.208	Lost First round series, 0–2 (St. Cloud State)	
Matt Thomas (2013 — 2018)
2013–14	WCHA	28	12	12	4	–	28	6th	38	18	16	4	.526	Won First round series, 2–1 (Alaska); Lost Semifinal, 4–5 (OT) (Ferris State)	
2014–15	WCHA	28	8	18	2	–	18	9th	34	8	22	4	.294		
2015–16	WCHA	28	8	16	4	–	20	8th	34	11	20	3	.368		
2016–17	WCHA	28	6	16	6	2	26	10th	34	7	21	6	.294		
2017–18	WCHA	28	4	21	3	3	18	10th	34	4	26	4	.176		
Matt Curley (2018 — 2021)
2018–19	WCHA	28	2	23	3	2	11	10th	34	3	28	3	.132		
2019–20	WCHA	28	4	18	6	3	21	8th	36	4	25	7	.208	Lost Quarterfinal series, 0–2 (Minnesota State)	
2020–21	WCHA	Season Cancelled													
Program Suspended
Matt Shasby (2022 — Present)
2022–23	Independent	–	–	–	–	–	–	–	28	8	19	1	.304		
2023–24	Independent	–	–	–	–	–	–	–	34	15	17	2	.471		
2024–25	Independent	–	–	–	–	–	–	–	34	6	23	5	.250		
2025–26	Independent	–	–	–	–	–	–	–	33	5	27	1	.167	Lost UCHC Quarterfinal, 0–3 (Stonehill); Lost UCHC Consolation Semifinal, 3–4 (OT) (Long Island)	
Totals									GP	W	L	T	%	Championships	
Regular season									1474	534	794	146	.412	1 Great West Championship	
Conference Post-season									57	9	48	0	.158		
NCAA Post-season									7	2	5	0	.286	3 NCAA Tournament Appearances	
Regular season and Post-season Record									1538	545	847	146	.402		

* Winning percentage is used when conference schedules are unbalanced.
