= Frank Bretti =

American former ice hockey head coach

Biographical details
- Education: Iona College

Coaching career (HC unless noted)
- 1990–1993: Iona (assistant)
- 1993–1996: Alaska Anchorage (assistant)
- 1997–2003: Iona
- 2004–2006: RPI (assistant)
- 2011–2014: New York Apple Core

Head coaching record
- Overall: 76–108–14 (college)

Frank Bretti is an American former ice hockey head coach who previously headed the program at Iona.

== Career ==
Bretti began coaching at his alma mater in 1990 as an assistant before advancing to the Division I level with a similar position at Alaska-Anchorage in 1993. Bretti was not retained when head coach Brush Christiansen retired in 1996 but he was back behind the bench at Iona by 1997, this time as head coach. Bretti replaced Bill Conforte after a 2-win season and while his first year in charge resulted in only 2 more wins Iona was poised to make the jump to the D-I ranks.

Iona was one of three full-time Metro Atlantic Athletic Conference schools to have a hockey program in existence in 1998 when the conference formed an ice hockey division and was thus promoted to Division-I status. Despite their poor showings in recent years Iona played fairly well under Bretti, finishing as a middle-of-the-pack team most years and reaching the conference tournament final in 2000. Unfortunately by 2003 the financial cost of the program caused the board of trustees to drop the program entirely and Bretti was once more out of a job.

A year later Bretti was back in the college ranks as an assistant at Rensselaer, staying for two seasons. He has most recently been the head coach for the New York Apple Core junior program.

== Head coaching record ==
=== College ===
Record table
Season	Team	Overall	Conference	Standing	Postseason
Iona Gaels (ECAC South) (1997–1998)
1997–98	Iona	4–20–1	4–3–1	3rd	
Iona:		4–20–1	4–3–1		
Iona Gaels (MAAC) (1998–2003)
1998–99	Iona	13–18–2	12-15-1	6th	MAAC Quarterfinals
1999–00	Iona	17–17–3	13–12–2	6th	MAAC Runner-Up
2000–01	Iona	18–13–4	16–6–4	t-2nd	MAAC Semifinals
2001–02	Iona	13–18–2	12–12–2	7th	MAAC Quarterfinals
2002–03	Iona	11–22–2	11–14–1	8th	MAAC Quarterfinals
Iona:		72–88–13	64–59–10		
Total:		76–108–14			
National champion Postseason invitational champion Conference regular season champion Conference regular season and conference tournament champion Division regular season champion Division regular season and conference tournament champion Conference tournament champion
