= 2024–25 Western Michigan Broncos men's ice hockey season =

NCAA Division I National Champion NCHC Regular Season, Champion NCHC Tournament, Champion NCAA Tournament, Champion
- Conference: NCHC
- Home ice: Lawson Arena

Rankings
- USCHO: #1
- USA Hockey: #1

Record
- Overall: 34–7–1
- Conference: 19–4–1
- Home: 18–2–1
- Road: 9–4–0
- Neutral: 7–1–0

Coaches and captains
- Head coach: Pat Ferschweiler
- Assistant coaches: Jason Herter; J. J. Crew; Jared Brown
- Captain: Tim Washe
- Alternate captain(s): Alex Bump; Matteo Costantini; Cam Knuble

The 2024–25 Western Michigan Broncos men's ice hockey season was the 51st season of play for the program and 12th in the NCHC. The Broncos represented Western Michigan University in the 2024–25 NCAA Division I men's ice hockey season, played their home games at the Lawson Arena and were coached by Pat Ferschweiler in his fourth season. The Broncos won the 2025 NCHC Tournament for the first time in program history, and received the conference's automatic bid to the 2025 NCAA tournament. They won their first national championship in program history.

== Season ==
Western Michigan began the season with one of the highest roster turnover rates in the country. Seventeen players, including the top three scorers and three of the top four defensemen, were gone. While some of the brain trust was still around in the presence of five-year player and Tim Washe, the Broncos were essentially having to completely remake the team. However, coach Ferschweiler had some advantages in rebuilding the team. Western had been one of the better teams on late, making the NCAA tournament in each of his three seasons behind the bench. Also, Western Michigan had made a name for itself as an up-tempo offense club. Ferschweiler succinctly iterated his plan for the team in an earlier interview:

"...we score four goals a game."

The aggressive game plan continued and, with much of college hockey still subscribing to a low-scoring, defensive-first mentality, Western was in a prime position to get the kind of recruits it needed for its fast-paced style. The Broncos dipped into the transfer portal, bringing in six experienced college players to bolster the lineup. The Defense got much-needed with two graduate players, Brian Kramer and Robby Drazner, both of whom were expected to provide a stabilizing presence on the blueline. However, most of the new players for the Broncos were freshmen with 10 neophytes filling out the roster. The club did bring in a few professional prospects, such as Ty Henricks and Zach Nehring, but their biggest addition was projected to be in goal. Hampton Slukynsky was a rising star after being named USHL Goaltender of the Year in 2024 and the team was hoping that he would turn into the club's starting goaltender in short order. The addition of the young netminder also came with an additional benefit as his brother, Grant was one of the players who transferred in, adding another offensive player to the mix.

With all the new additions, Western was a complete unknown and many did not have high expectations outside the program, though the team still had a favorable enough view to earn a spot in the national preseason polls.

=== Hot start ===
When the Broncos began the season, coach Ferschweiler decided to rotate his goalies. The team alternated between senior Cameron Rowe and Slukynsky the younger, wanting to ease the teenager into the college game. While both goalies looked good early on, the offense was producing at its normal rate. Alex Bump led a lineup that could routinely go three lines deep for goal production with seven forwards finishing the year in double-digits. The club put up outstanding numbers early but had their ego checked when they ran into championship-favorites Boston College at the end of October. After scoring the first two goals, the Broncos were outplayed in the final 50 minutes and were steamrolled by the Eagles, losing 2–4. The team seemed to take the loss to heart and didn't lose again for over a month. Their stellar play in November got the team a promotion up into the top-10 and had the club looking like a sure-fire tournament team by Thanksgiving.

=== Scoring inconsistency ===
Just before the winter break, Western Michigan was given a chance to prove how good it was by playing back-to-back weekends against two of the best teams in the country. After downing Michigan in the first game, the Broncos' offense seemed to dry up. Despite getting a superlative performance from Slukynsky in goal, WMU could only summon 18 shots in the rematch, falling 1–2. The next week against Denver saw nearly the same occurrence with a win followed by the offense falling flat and leading to a loss in an otherwise winnable game.

The splits the Broncos earned in those two weeks allowed the team to hold serve and keep their position in the standings. However, failing to generate scoring chances was something an offensive team could not afford to do (Western had 13 total shots in the third period in the two losses). With a glaring issue having been revealed, the winter break could not have come at a better time. However, while coach Ferschweiler had an opportunity to fine tune his offense, the team would be without the serviced of Hampton Slukynsky for two weeks after they returned to play. The goaltender had joined Team USA for the World Junior Championships and would be unavailable until after the tournament concluded on the January 5. While Western still had the experienced hand of Rowe to rely on, the Broncos' goaltender could do nothing to resolve the up-and-down offense.

The team returned to the ice in the Great Lakes Invitational and eked out a win the first game. The championship saw the Broncos pitted against another top-ranked team in Michigan State. The offense was held to just a single power play goal in the loss but the team showed a much better effort by putting up 30 shots against one of the nation's stingiest defenses.

=== Conference title ===
Western Michigan was able to take advantage of a relatively weak NCHC field in the second half of the year and rack up a huge win total. The Broncos went 13–3 in their final 16 conference games thank in part to the offense getting back on track and averaging well over 4 goals per game during that stretch. After Slukynsky's return to Kalamazoo, the goaltending rotation resumed. However, the team started seeing some separation between its netminders. While Slukynsky was routinely putting forth a solid performance, Rowe's play began to suffer in February. After two lackluster outings, Rowe was relegated to being the backup with Slukynsky taking over as the primary netminder at the end of the month.

Even with the slight dip in Rowe's play, Western Michigan was able to sew up the regular season title with more than a week to go and ended up finishing 10 points ahead of second place. The team's outstanding record gave the program its first conference title in 50 years as well as a guaranteed spot in the NCAA tournament.

=== NCHC playoffs ===
The team began its postseason run by hosting St. Cloud State for its final home games of the year. The Huskies, who had started the season with a great deal of hope, were hopelessly outclassed by the Broncos and lit up 6–2 in consecutive nights. Western continued to receive scoring from up and down the lineup with Bump's 5 points being the high-water mark.

The semifinal match saw the team face off against North Dakota, who were fighting desperately for a shot at the tournament. Once again, however, WMU was the better of the two and put 16 more shots on goal in the contest. The Hawks' netminder kept the game close for a while but UND's inability to solve Slukynsky forced them to pull their goalie late and two empty-net goals from Western sealed the game.

Western Michigan advanced to the NCHC championship for only the second time and were set against the only other conference member who would take part in this year's NCAA tournament, Denver. The Broncos got off to a good start, outplaying the Pioneers in the first but they failed to capitalize and the match remained scoreless entering the second. Denver took control of the game in the middle of the period and scored three times in under five minutes, stunning the Broncos. After that offensive flurry, Western got back to their game and took over the match, attacking the Denver cage for the entire second half of regulation. Zack Sharp got the team on the board at the start of the third and, although Western continued to apply pressure, nearly 10 minutes went by before the team could score again. Fortunately, when Bump netted his 22nd of the year, the Pioneers had pulled back into a defensive shell and had been unable to add to their lead. With under 4 minutes to play, Washe tied the score and forced the game into overtime. Momentum remained with Western in the extra session with the Broncos throwing 16 more shots at the Denver net but nothing went in. Undaunted, the team got right back to the offense at the start of the fifth period and Bump fired home the winning goal just 22 seconds into the period.

=== NCAA tournament ===
The first NCHC championship for Western Michigan not only gave the program its second 30-win season in history but it also assured the team of a #1 seed. Unfortunately, because Michigan State had priority seeding, the Broncos were sent to the Fargo Regional instead of the Toledo Regional. However, due to NCAA seeding requirements regarding host teams, Wester did receive a slight improvement to its first round match when they were set opposite Minnesota State instead of Penn State.

The game played out largely like the classic irresistible force paradox with the Mavericks operating as the immovable object. While both sides played fast and hard throughout the night, the game hinged on which was better: the Western's offense or Minnesota State's defense. Liam Valente got Western the lead at the beginning of the second period on the power play. This was fortunate as MSU did not take another penalty for the remainder of the game, forcing WMU to have to generate its own chances. This proved difficult as the Mavericks were one of the top defensive teams in the country and held the Broncos to under 30 shots in regulation. With Western unable to increase its lead, Minnesota State was able to wait for its opportunities and ended up cashing in at the beginning of the third. The close-checking game remained tied after 60 minutes and the two sides headed into overtime. With MSU content to play defense, it was up to Western to try and break the game open. This resulted in a shot disparity in favor of the Broncos but not a high number of chances. With nothing resolved after four periods, Both sides were beginning to look tired. Western nearly lost the game when it turned the puck over in its own end but a stick check stopped a sure game-winning goal from being scored. After several more chances went for naught, Zach Nehring threw a weak shot on goal that the MSU netminder failed to cover. Grant Slukynsky was first on the puck and put a backhand in front of the net that deflected in off of a Maverick defender.

With just their second tournament win in program history, Western Michigan advanced to face Massachusetts in the Regional Final. Perhaps due to their late night two days earlier, the Broncos were slow out of the gate and found themselves down by a goal after 20 minutes. Western kicked its offense into gear in the second period taking over the pace of play for long stretched in the middle frame. For a long time, this came to no avail but the constant pressure eventually forced the minutemen into a costly mistake. After failing on their first power play of the game, Western Michigan received a glorious opportunity when Massachusetts was called for a major penalty near the end of the second period. Valente tied the game with his second goal of the tournament just 22 seconds into the man advantage. After failing for the remainder of the period, Western began the third with more than 3 minutes left on their power play but almost squandered the chance. With less than a minute remaining on the major, Washe scored his 16th of the season to give the Broncos the lead. Western then handed UMass a golden chance when Iiro Hakkarainen took a major penalty for elbowing, though he was allowed to remain in the game. Fortunately, the penalty kill rose to the occasion and prevented the Minutemen from scoring. WMU was then able to rely on its defense to carefully protect their 1-goal lead until the end of the game, earning the program its first trip to the Frozen Four.

==== Frozen Four ====
In front of an NHL-sized crowd, Western Michigan took on Denver for the fourth time that season. With the three previous games all being decided by one goal, the match promised to be a close affair but Western did its level best to banish the Pioneers early. WMU outshot Denver 32–8 through 40 minutes and completely dominated the game. Kramer and Owen Michaels combined to put the Broncos up by a pair at the end of the second and, with the way the two were play, the game should have been over. Denver, however, was the reigning national champions and they refused to go away quietly. repaying Western for the comeback bid in the conference championship, Denver scored twice in the third to force overtime while a stunned WMU audience watched in discomfort. Western regained their edge in shots in overtime, however, just like their last meeting, four periods were not enough. In the first Frozen Four game to need double overtime in 29 years, Western echoed their NCHC championship performance by scoring on the first shot of double overtime. This time it came from the stick of Michaels, who rang the puck off of the post from the high slot. The win set a new program record for wins in a season with 33.

==== National Championship ====
Western Michigan made its first appearance in the national championship against an old hand, Boston University. In just the fifth meeting between the two, Western was able to take an early lead thanks to Wyatt Schingoethe, who was playing in the final game as a Bronco. While BU managed to tie the game soon thereafter, Cole Crusberg-Roseen restored Western's lead when he cased in on a failed clearing attempt from the Terriers. Western grew its lead when Henricks scored in the early part of the second, however, the Broncos gave BU life by taking two penalties in the second half of the period, allowing Boston University to cut the lead back to 1.

Entering the third period, Western was just 20 minutes away from a national championship. All the team had to do was hold serve and play even hockey for the rest of the game. The plan was nearly ruined a few minutes into the period when BU was able to get the puck past a sprawling Slukynsky. Luckilly, Joona Väisänen had been laying across the goal-line and his shin pads stopped the puck from crossing the goal. After the near-disaster, the Terriers had a few more scoring chances stopped before Michaels was able to collect a loose puck and break down the ice on a 2-on-1. The sophomore fired the puck far-post, nearly the same spot where he had scored the semifinal's winning goal, and restored the Broncos' 2-goal edge. The score allowed Western to breathe and relax while BU became increasingly desperate. The Terriers briefly thought they had gotten their third goal of the night with about 8 minutes to play but the referees ruled that Slukynsky had frozen the puck. With about 4 minutes to play, Schingoethe skated the puck below the BU goal-line and found Hakkarainen on the short side. While his initial shot was stopped, the puck rebounded up and the Terriers' netminder accidentally swept the puck in with the back of his glove. The crazy bounce all but ended the game as Western was now up by 3 goals and BU had inadequate time to recover. With nothing to lose, Boston University pulled their goaltender and put all their efforts towards the offense. with about 2 minutes to play, Michaels was able to get control of the puck inside his own blueline and send the rubber 120 feet down the ice into the open goal. The goal capped off the scoring and Western was able to frit away the rest of the match to win the program's first national championship.

== Departures ==
Player	Position	Nationality	Cause
Jacob Bauer	Defenseman	United States	Graduation (retired)
Carter Berger	Defenseman	Canada	Graduation (signed with Hartford Wolf Pack)
Trevor Bishop	Forward	United States	Graduation (retired)
Cole Burtch	Forward	Canada	Transferred to Ferris State
Joe Cassetti	Forward	United States	Graduation (signed with Belfast Giants)
Sam Colangelo	Forward	United States	Graduation (signed with Anaheim Ducks)
Cédric Fiedler	Defenseman	United States	Graduation (signed with Lausanne HC)
Zak Galambos	Defenseman	United States	Graduation (signed with Belfast Giants)
Luke Grainger	Forward	Canada	Graduation (signed with San Jose Barracuda)
Chad Hillebrand	Forward	United States	Graduation (signed with Colorado Eagles)
Daniel Hilsendager	Defenseman	Canada	Graduation (signed with Unity Miners)
Hugh Larkin	Forward	United States	Transferred to Connecticut
Oliver MacDonald	Forward	United States	Graduation (retired)
Jacob Napier	Defenseman	United States	Transferred to Colgate
Ethan Phillips	Forward	Canada	Graduation (retired)
Dawson Smith	Goaltender	Canada	Transferred to Robert Morris
Dylan Wendt	Forward	United States	Signed professional contract (New Jersey Devils)

== Recruiting ==
Player	Position	Nationality	Age	Notes
Zach Bade	Forward	United States	21	Rosemount, MN
Connor Brown	Forward	United States	19	Estero, FL
Robby Drazner	Defenseman	United States	24	Buffalo Grove, IL; graduate transfer from Miami
Grady Gallatin	Defenseman	United States	20	White Bear Lake, MN
Iiro Hakkarainen	Forward	Finland	20	Helsinki, FIN
Ty Henricks	Forward	United States	19	Mission Viejo, CA; selected 183rd overall in 2023
Ryan Humphrey	Forward	United States	21	Northville, MI; joined mid-season
Ryan Kusler	Forward	United States	21	Battle Creek, MI
Tristan Lemyre	Forward	Canada	22	Mirabel, QC; transfer from Denver
Jack Mesic	Defenseman	United States	21	Plymouth, MI; transfer from Ferris State
Zach Nehring	Forward	United States	19	Minot, ND; selected 82nd overall in 2023
Zack Sharp	Defenseman	United States	19	Naperville, IL
Grant Slukynsky	Forward	United States	22	Edina, MN; transfer from Northern Michigan
Hampton Slukynsky	Goaltender	United States	19	Warroad, MN; selected 118th overall in 2023
Joona Väisänen	Defenseman	Finland	20	Espoo, FIN; selected 175th overall in 2024
Liam Valente	Forward	Sweden	21	Märsta, SWE; transfer from Providence

== Roster ==
As of January 31, 2025.

No.	Nat.	Player	Class	Pos	Height	Weight	DoB	Hometown	Previous team	NHL rights
1	(United States)	Kirk Laursen	Junior (RS)	G	6' 3" (1.91 m)	185 lb (84 kg)	2000-01-02	Bloomfield Hills, Michigan	Miami (NCHC)	—
2	(United States)	Grady Gallatin	Freshman	D	6' 3" (1.91 m)	179 lb (81 kg)	2004-06-07	White Bear Lake, Minnesota	Janesville Jets (NAHL)	—
3	(United States)	Cole Crusberg-Roseen	Sophomore	D	5' 11" (1.8 m)	184 lb (83 kg)	2002-04-14	Stratham, New Hampshire	Lincoln Stars (USHL)	—
4	(United States)	Robby Drazner	Graduate	D	6' 1" (1.85 m)	205 lb (93 kg)	2000-02-13	Buffalo Grove, Illinois	Miami (NCHC)	—
6	(United States)	Jack Mesic	Sophomore	D	5' 9" (1.75 m)	176 lb (80 kg)	2002-10-18	Plymouth, Michigan	Ferris State (CCHA)	—
8	(United States)	Zach Nehring	Freshman	F	6' 3" (1.91 m)	179 lb (81 kg)	2005-03-07	Minot, North Dakota	Sioux Falls Stampede (USHL)	WPG, 82nd overall 2023
9	(United States)	Zach Bade	Freshman	F	6' 2" (1.88 m)	183 lb (83 kg)	2003-04-26	Rosemount, Minnesota	Tri-City Storm (USHL)	—
10	(United States)	Zack Sharp	Freshman	D	6' 1" (1.85 m)	181 lb (82 kg)	2005-03-29	Naperville, Illinois	Cedar Rapids RoughRiders (USHL)	—
11	(United States)	Ethan Wolthers	Junior	F	5' 8" (1.73 m)	155 lb (70 kg)	2001-07-19	Valencia, California	Minnesota Wilderness (NAHL)	—
12	(United States)	Connor Brown	Freshman	F	5' 8" (1.73 m)	185 lb (84 kg)	2005-05-03	Estero, Florida	Waterloo Black Hawks (USHL)	—
13	(United States)	Grant Slukynsky	Sophomore	F	6' 1" (1.85 m)	205 lb (93 kg)	2002-03-12	Edina, Minnesota	Northern Michigan (CCHA)	—
14	(United States)	Brian Kramer	Graduate	D	5' 11" (1.8 m)	185 lb (84 kg)	2000-07-20	Wexford, Pennsylvania	American International (AHA)	—
16	(United States)	Tim Washe (C)	Graduate	F	6' 3" (1.91 m)	210 lb (95 kg)	2001-08-25	Detroit, Michigan	Nanaimo Clippers (BCHL)	—
17	(United States)	Ty Henricks	Freshman	F	6' 4" (1.93 m)	216 lb (98 kg)	2005-06-28	Mission Viejo, California	Muskegon Lumberjacks (USHL)	NYR, 183rd overall 2023
18	(United States)	Wyatt Schingoethe	Senior	F	5' 11" (1.8 m)	180 lb (82 kg)	2002-08-03	Algonquin, Illinois	Waterloo Black Hawks (USHL)	TOR, 195th overall 2020
19	(United States)	Cam Knuble (A)	Graduate	F	6' 0" (1.83 m)	200 lb (91 kg)	2000-07-23	Grand Rapids, Michigan	Muskegon Lumberjacks (USHL)	—
20	(United States)	Alex Bump (A)	Sophomore	F	6' 0" (1.83 m)	194 lb (88 kg)	2003-11-20	Burnsville, Minnesota	Tri-City Storm (USHL)	PHI, 133rd overall 2022
21	(United States)	Ryan Kusler	Freshman	F	6' 0" (1.83 m)	187 lb (85 kg)	2003-05-19	Battle Creek, Michigan	Omaha Lancers (USHL)	—
22	(Finland)	Iiro Hakkarainen	Freshman	F	5' 11" (1.8 m)	172 lb (78 kg)	2004-03-09	Helsinki, Finland	Fargo Force (USHL)	—
23	(Sweden)	Liam Valente	Junior	F	5' 11" (1.8 m)	183 lb (83 kg)	2003-05-23	Märsta, Sweden	Providence (HEA)	—
24	(United States)	Garrett Szydlowski	Sophomore	F	5' 10" (1.78 m)	185 lb (84 kg)	2002-06-12	Detroit, Michigan	Wenatchee Wild (BCHL)	—
25	(Canada)	Matteo Costantini (A)	Senior	F	6' 0" (1.83 m)	192 lb (87 kg)	2002-08-16	St. Catharines, Ontario	North Dakota (NCHC)	BUF, 131st overall 2020
26	(United States)	Ean Somoza	Sophomore	F	6' 3" (1.91 m)	188 lb (85 kg)	2003-02-08	Thousand Oaks, California	Wenatchee Wild (BCHL)	—
27	(Finland)	Joona Väisänen	Freshman	D	6' 0" (1.83 m)	176 lb (80 kg)	2004-07-29	Espoo, Finland	Dubuque Fighting Saints (USHL)	PIT, 175th overall 2024
28	(United States)	Ryan Humphrey	Freshman	F	5' 11" (1.8 m)	165 lb (75 kg)	2003-04-08	Northville, Michigan	Green Bay Gamblers (USHL)	—
29	(Canada)	Tristan Lemyre	Junior	F	5' 9" (1.75 m)	170 lb (77 kg)	2001-01-15	Mirabel, Quebec	Denver (NCHC)	—
30	(United States)	Hampton Slukynsky	Freshman	G	6' 1" (1.85 m)	190 lb (86 kg)	2005-07-02	Warroad, Minnesota	Fargo Force (USHL)	LAK, 118th overall 2023
31	(United States)	Cameron Rowe	Graduate	G	6' 3" (1.91 m)	210 lb (95 kg)	2001-06-01	Wilmette, Illinois	Wisconsin (Big Ten)	—
33	(Sweden)	Samuel Sjölund	Junior	D	6' 1" (1.85 m)	175 lb (79 kg)	2001-05-19	Stockholm, Sweden	Dubuque Fighting Saints (USHL)	DAL, 111th overall 2019
34	(United States)	Owen Michaels	Sophomore	F	6' 0" (1.83 m)	185 lb (84 kg)	2002-05-01	Detroit, Michigan	Dubuque Fighting Saints (USHL)	—

== Standings ==
2024–25 National Collegiate Hockey Conference Standings
	Conference record										Overall record					
	GP	W	L	T	OTW	OTL	SW	PTS	GF	GA	GP	W	L	T	GF	GA
#1 Western Michigan †*	24	19	4	1	4	3	0	57	98	51	42	34	7	1	167	86
#16 Arizona State	24	14	9	1	2	5	1	47	91	69	37	21	14	2	136	103
#3 Denver	24	15	8	1	2	1	0	45	89	59	44	31	12	1	174	94
Omaha	24	14	9	1	1	1	1	44	82	69	36	18	17	1	105	99
#18 North Dakota	24	14	9	1	3	1	1	42	81	73	38	21	15	2	120	111
Colorado College	24	11	12	1	4	1	1	32	68	72	37	18	18	1	106	113
Minnesota Duluth	24	9	13	2	2	2	1	30	63	77	36	13	20	3	99	117
St. Cloud State	24	7	16	1	2	3	0	23	53	79	36	14	21	1	79	110
Miami	24	0	23	1	0	3	0	4	38	114	34	3	28	3	63	143
Championship: March 22, 2025 † indicates conference regular season champion (Penrose Cup) * indicates conference tournament champion (Frozen Faceoff Championship Trophy); Rankings: USCHO.com Top 20 Poll

== Schedule and results ==
Date	Time	Opponent^{#}	Rank^{#}	Site	TV	Decision	Result	Attendance	Record
Exhibition
October 5	7:00 pm	USNTDP*	#17	Lawson Arena • Kalamazoo, Michigan (Exhibition)			W 4–1		
Regular Season
October 11	7:00 pm	Ferris State*	#17	Lawson Arena • Kalamazoo, Michigan		Rowe	W 4–1	3,637	1–0–0
October 12	7:00 pm	at Ferris State*	#17	Ewigleben Arena • Big Rapids, Michigan	FloHockey	Slukynsky	W 5–1	1,112	2–0–0
October 17	7:00 pm	Bowling Green*	#17	Lawson Arena • Kalamazoo, Michigan		Rowe	W 6–2	2,179	3–0–0
Exhibition
October 19	6:00 pm	York*	#17	Lawson Arena • Kalamazoo, Michigan (Exhibition)		Slukynsky	W 8–0	1,829	
Regular Season
October 26	7:00 pm	at #2 Boston College*	#14	Conte Forum • Chestnut Hill, Massachusetts	ESPN+	Slukynsky	L 2–4	7,884	3–1–0
November 8	8:00 pm	at Omaha	#14	Baxter Arena • Omaha, Nebraska		Rowe	W 2–1	6,683	4–1–0 (1–0–0)
November 9	8:00 pm	at Omaha	#14	Baxter Arena • Omaha, Nebraska		Slukynsky	W 4–2	7,022	5–1–0 (2–0–0)
November 15	7:00 pm	#8 Colorado College	#13	Lawson Arena • Kalamazoo, Michigan		Rowe	W 3–2 ^{OT}	3,437	6–1–0 (3–0–0)
November 16	6:00 pm	#8 Colorado College	#13	Lawson Arena • Kalamazoo, Michigan		Slukynsky	T 1–1 ^{SOL}	3,966	6–1–1 (3–0–1)
November 22	8:00 pm	at Minnesota Duluth	#9	AMSOIL Arena • Duluth, Minnesota		Rowe	W 5–2	5,057	7–1–1 (4–0–1)
November 23	6:00 pm	at Minnesota Duluth	#9	AMSOIL Arena • Duluth, Minnesota		Slukynsky	W 4–1	5,831	8–1–1 (5–0–1)
November 29	7:00 pm	#6 Michigan*	#7	Lawson Arena • Kalamazoo, Michigan		Rowe	W 4–1	3,974	9–1–1
November 30	7:00 pm	at #6 Michigan*	#7	Yost Ice Arena • Ann Arbor, Michigan	BTN+	Slukynsky	L 1–2	5,800	9–2–1
December 6	7:00 pm	#2 Denver	#7	Lawson Arena • Kalamazoo, Michigan		Rowe	W 3–2	3,586	10–2–1 (6–0–1)
December 7	6:00 pm	#2 Denver	#7	Lawson Arena • Kalamazoo, Michigan		Slukynsky	L 2–3 ^{OT}	3,930	10–3–1 (6–1–1)
Great Lakes Invitational
December 29	3:37 pm	vs. Michigan Tech*	#6	Van Andel Arena • Grand Rapids, Michigan (Great Lakes Invitational Semifinal)	Midco Sports+	Rowe	W 4–3 ^{OT}	9,900	11–3–1
December 30	7:00 pm	vs. #1 Michigan State*	#4	Van Andel Arena • Grand Rapids, Michigan (Great Lakes Invitational Championship)	Midco Sports+	Rowe	L 1–3	6,857	11–4–1
Regular Season
January 3	7:00 pm	Alaska Anchorage*	#4	Lawson Arena • Kalamazoo, Michigan		Rowe	W 4–1	2,654	12–4–1
January 4	6:00 pm	Alaska Anchorage*	#4	Lawson Arena • Kalamazoo, Michigan		Rowe	W 5–2	3,033	13–4–1
January 17	8:00 pm	at #14 North Dakota	#4	Ralph Engelstad Arena • Grand Forks, North Dakota	Midco	Rowe	W 3–2 ^{OT}	11,603	14–4–1 (7–1–1)
January 18	7:00 pm	at #14 North Dakota	#4	Ralph Engelstad Arena • Grand Forks, North Dakota	Midco	Slukynsky	W 5–1	11,659	15–4–1 (8–1–1)
January 24	7:00 pm	Miami	#3	Lawson Arena • Kalamazoo, Michigan		Rowe	W 8–3	3,595	16–4–1 (9–1–1)
January 25	6:00 pm	Miami	#3	Lawson Arena • Kalamazoo, Michigan		Slukynsky	W 2–0	3,840	17–4–1 (10–1–1)
January 31	9:00 pm	at Colorado College	#3	Ed Robson Arena • Colorado Springs, Colorado	CBSSN	Rowe	W 4–1	3,541	18–4–1 (11–1–1)
February 1	8:00 pm	at Colorado College	#3	Ed Robson Arena • Colorado Springs, Colorado		Slukynsky	L 2–3 ^{OT}	3,550	18–5–1 (11–2–1)
February 7	7:00 pm	St. Cloud State	#4	Lawson Arena • Kalamazoo, Michigan		Rowe	W 4–0	3,425	19–5–1 (12–2–1)
February 8	6:00 pm	St. Cloud State	#4	Lawson Arena • Kalamazoo, Michigan		Slukynsky	W 6–1	3,572	20–5–1 (13–2–1)
February 14	7:00 pm	#20 Omaha	#3	Lawson Arena • Kalamazoo, Michigan		Rowe	W 5–4 ^{OT}	2,823	21–5–1 (14–2–1)
February 15	6:00 pm	#20 Omaha	#3	Lawson Arena • Kalamazoo, Michigan		Slukynsky	W 6–1	3,580	22–5–1 (15–2–1)
February 21	9:00 pm	at #12 Arizona State	#3	Mullett Arena • Tempe, Arizona		Rowe	L 3–5	5,323	22–6–1 (15–3–1)
February 22	7:00 pm	at #12 Arizona State	#3	Mullett Arena • Tempe, Arizona		Slukynsky	W 4–3 ^{OT}	5,250	23–6–1 (16–3–1)
February 28	7:00 pm	#18 North Dakota	#4	Lawson Arena • Kalamazoo, Michigan		Slukynsky	W 6–4	3,571	24–6–1 (17–3–1)
March 1	6:00 pm	#18 North Dakota	#4	Lawson Arena • Kalamazoo, Michigan		Slukynsky	L 3–4 ^{OT}	3,623	24–7–1 (17–4–1)
March 7	7:00 pm	at Miami	#4	Steve Cady Arena • Oxford, Ohio		Slukynsky	W 8–3	1,411	25–7–1 (18–4–1)
March 8	7:00 pm	at Miami	#4	Steve Cady Arena • Oxford, Ohio		Slukynsky	W 5–2	2,338	26–7–1 (19–4–1)
NCHC Tournament
March 14	7:00 pm	St. Cloud State	#3	Lawson Arena • Kalamazoo, Michigan (Quarterfinal Game 1)		Slukynsky	W 6–2	3,553	27–7–1
March 15	6:00 pm	St. Cloud State	#3	Lawson Arena • Kalamazoo, Michigan (Quarterfinal Game 2)		Slukynsky	W 6–2	3,456	28–7–1
March 21	8:30 pm	vs. #17 North Dakota	#3	Xcel Energy Center • Saint Paul, Minnesota (Semifinal)	CBSSN	Slukynsky	W 4–2	7,532	29–7–1
March 22	8:30 pm	vs. #6 Denver	#3	Xcel Energy Center • Saint Paul, Minnesota (Championship)	CBSSN	Slukynsky	W 4–3 ^{2OT}	5,853	30–7–1
NCAA Tournament
March 27	5:00 pm	vs. #14 Minnesota State*	#3	Scheels Arena • Fargo, North Dakota (Regional Semifinal)	ESPNU	Slukynsky	W 2–1 ^{2OT}	4,817	31–7–1
March 29	5:30 pm	vs. #13 Massachusetts*	#3	Scheels Arena • Fargo, North Dakota (Regional Final)	ESPNU	Slukynsky	W 2–1	4,329	32–7–1
April 10	5:00 pm	vs. #6 Denver*	#3	Enterprise Center • St. Louis, Missouri (National Semifinal)	ESPN2	Slukynsky	W 3–2 ^{2OT}	16,814	33–7–1
April 12	7:30 pm	vs. #8 Boston University*	#3	Enterprise Center • St. Louis, Missouri (National Championship)	ESPN2	Slukynsky	W 6–2	16,953	34–7–1
*Non-conference game. ^{#}Rankings from USCHO.com Poll. All times are in Eastern Time. Source:

== NCAA tournament ==
=== Regional semifinal ===
March 27, 2025; 4:00 pm	(1) Western Michigan	2–1 (2OT) (0–0, 1–0, 0–1, 0–0, 1–0)	(4) Minnesota State	Scheels Arena; Attendance: 4,817

Game reference

Hampton Slukynsky
Goalies
Alex Tracy
Referees:
Jim Curtin
Jeremy Tufts
Linesmen:
Kevin Briganti
Nick Briganti

(Michaels) Liam Valente (13) – PP – 20:48	1–0
	1–1	41:51 – Kaden Bohlsen (12) (Krajnik, Murr)
(Nehring, Valente) Grant Slukynsky (10) – GW – 87:14	2–1

2 min
Penalties
4 min
44
Shots
29

Game summary
The game started with a bang as both teams laid big hits on one another. The temperature cooled down a bit after the first minute but both squads skated up and down the ice as they looked for an early goal. During one such rush, WMU was able to turn the puck over in the Mavericks' end and, in reply, Jordan Power was called for tripping when he tried to prevent an open shot at his goal. Western had one of the best power plays in the country but MSU was able to match with a stelar kill. The few shots that made it through to Alex Tracy weren't too dangerous and Minnesota State was able to survive. The Mavericks turned defense to offense and immediately went on the attack. They were able to get a 3-on-2 but the Bronco defenders were able to limit them to a sharp-angle shot from the wall. Chances came fast and furious for both sides but both netminders looked to be on their respective games. A heavy hit by Campbell Cichosz on Owen Michaels in the corner looked to stun the Western forward but the Broncos were still able to tilt the ice towards the Mavericks' end in the middle of the period. Minnesota State was able to counter after WMU iced the puck but the Mavericks missed on a couple of passing plays and never ended up with a decent shot on goal. The fast and physical play continued and both benches called for penalties but the referees allowed play to continue. With about 6 minutes to go, MSU got on another odd-man rush but saw the opportunity go for naught when the play was blown dead for offsides. Minnesota State continued to let chances melt down and get low-percentage chances on goal but the continual puck possession in the WMU end prevented the Broncos from getting anything going in the later half of the period. The first real scoring opportunity came with two and half minutes left when Evan Murr launched an off-balance point shot that was deflected en route and just barely stopped by Hampton Slukynsky. Despite the up and down action, neither team took any real risks during the period until the waning seconds. Alex Bump was able to sneak past the MSU defense and streak in on Tracy. However, just as he was going to shoot, Adam Eisele slashed his stick and was called for a minor penalty. The first 16 seconds of the man-advantage did not produce any results with the rest being held over to the start of the second.

Western swiftly got the puck into the zone but had trouble getting through the MSU defense. After a blocked shot, the Mavericks collected the puck but failed to clear and the rubber bounced to Liam Valente. The Bronco forward then walked to the center of the right circle and beat Tracy high-glove for the opening goal. WMU continued to press after the goal and forced Minnesota State into a few turnovers but they were unable to capitalize. With Western taking over the balance of play MSU needed someone to change the momentum and that's exactly when they got when Brett Moravec went on a solo rush up the ice. After splitting to Bronco defenders, Moravec was slashed by Joona Väisänen to give the Mavericks their first power play of the match. Unfortunately for Minnesota State, their passing continued to be poor and Western ended up getting better chances. Even when the Mavs were able to set up a one-timer, Murr's stick snapped and the Broncso were able to clear. It was only at the very end of the man-advantage that MSU was able to generate a good scoring chance but a sprawling Slukynsky just managed to keep the puck out of the net. After the power play, the game reverted back to a back-and-forth match with both defenses preventing any good shots on goal. Around the mid point of the period, Western's offense began to exert itself once more but Tracy remained stout and kept the puck out of the net. MSU countered after a few minutes and Will Hillman was able to get a puck through Slukynsky but it bounded to the side of the goal. The Mavericks were able to apply some offensive pressure but, again, several opportunities went by the wayside thanks to inaccurate or deflected passes. With under 5 minutes to play, Brian Carrabes fired a shot from the point that just missed the far corner of the net past a screed Slukynsky. MSU kept the puck in the WMU end for much of the remaining time but continued to be plagued by bad passes. With just seconds left, Josh Groll skated into the slot and received a pass from behind the net. He launched a one-timer on goal but the shot was low and Slukynsky was able to make a leg save to keep the Mavericks off of the scoresheet.

After opening the period by icing the puck, Minnesota State was able to get its offense into gear and not only set up in the zone set up in the zone but finally get a good shot on goal. Slukynsky was able to stop the initial shot from Murr but the rebound from Zach Krajnik bounced up and was toward the goal off of a Bronco defender. As it was sliding towards the net, Kaden Bohlsen was the first one to reach the puck and he slammed it home to tie the match. End-to-end action persisted after the goal with both sides narrowly missing out on scoring chances. At around the 12-minute mark, Western appeared to commit a tripping penalty right in front of the Maverick net but neither referee made a call, much to the displeasure of Minnesota State. Fortunately for the Mavs, they were able to get control of the puck and push it back up the ice. With both teams not willing to take a risk and make a disastrous mistake, the game reverted to a tight-checking match but that didn't prevent the offenses from getting their chances. With about 9 minutes to play, MSU got on a late 2-on-1 but could not beat Slukynsky. Shortly afterwards, on a separate possession, Moravec attempted to lay a heavy hit on Bump but as the Bronco forward moved to avoid the check he caught a trailing leg and crashed to the ice. That play had the Western bench up in arms but the referees, perhaps as a makeup call, did not assess a penalty. Minnesota State continued to play physically, crashing into WMU players when the opportunities presented themselves and made use of the long leash provided by the refs. The final few minutes were played mostly in the Western end and Luigi Benincasa was nearly able to find the winning goal. With about 70 seconds left, The Maverick forward got a rebound right in front of the net and one-timed it towards the goal, the puck was rolling and he wasn't able to make good contact, causing the shot to just go off angle and bounce off of the far post. However, neither team could find the winning tally and overtime was needed.

Western Michigan went on the attack at the start of OT but MSU's defense didn't crack. The kept up their physical play and then countered but were unable to get the puck past Slukynsky. A few minutes into the period, MSU committed three consecutive icings. In order to give his players a breather, head coach Luke Strand used his timeout. On the ensuing faceoff, the Mavs got control of the puck and skated it up the ice to take the pressure off. Minnesota State then began to establish zone time and got several good looks on goal but Western's sturdy defense was able to block the puck away. Even though only a few shots got through, Slukynsky still had to stay on the top of his game and stop several high-percentage chances. The middle of the period was typified by tight defense with the refs allowing both teams to commit letter-of-the-law penalties without punishment. MSU was able to take advantage of this and tilt the puck towards the Western end but that didn't prevent the Broncos from having chances of their own. Off of a faceoff in the Maverick end, Bump wired a shot high on goal but Tracy blocked it with his shoulder. A little later the Purple goaltender was called upon again to stop Grant Slukynsky at the side of the net and kept the game going. With five and half left in the period, Western committed an icing. With the players already tired from a long shift, it was Pat Ferschweiler's turn to call a timeout. About a minute later, Bump was able to find a streaking Michaels who went in alone on the MSU net but Tracy was able to make a glove save on a low shot. Both defenses were instrumental in keeping the puck out of the net for the final three minutes as both teams continued to press. With just a few seconds left, Bump found a rebound in front of the Minnesota State crease but he had to rush the shot and Alex Trace telescoped out to made the save just before the end of the period.

Western again was the first to the attack at the beginning of the fifth period and almost was able to find the net just seconds into the session. MSU replied soon thereafter and had their own glorious chance halted by Slukynsky. A few minutes later, WMU coughed up the puck deep in their own end but Luc Wilson had the puck knocked off of his blade as he tried to stickhandle around the Bronco netminder. About a minute later, Western nearly found the net when Wyatt Schingoethe got the puck alone in front of the goal. Tracy made two toe saves before stopping Tim Washe on a third to save the team's season. With both teams growing increasingly fatigued, the hitting tailed off but MSU remained the more physical of the two. Nearing the middle of the period, Zach Nehring threw a weak shot on goal that Tracy was not able to collect. Grant Slukynsky backhanded the rebound which deflected off of Wilson into the net, ending the game.

=== Regional final ===
March 29, 2025; 5:30 pm	(1) Western Michigan	2–1 (0–1, 1–0, 1–0)	(3) Massachusetts	Scheels Arena; Attendance: 4,329

Game reference

Hampton Slukynsky
Goalies
Michael Hrabal
Referees:
Brady Johnson
Bobby Lukkason
Linesmen:
Nathan Voll
Tyler Landman

	0–1	8:50 – Dans Ločmelis (8) (Jenčko, Alger)
(Sjölund, Michaels) Liam Valente (14) – PP – 38:35	1–1
(Kramer, Väisänen) Tim Washe (16) – GW PP – 42:47	2–1

9 min
Penalties
17 min
30
Shots
29

Game summary

=== National semifinal ===
April 10, 2025; 4:00 pm	(F1) Western Michigan	3–2 (2OT) (0–0, 2–0, 0–2, 0–0, 1–0)	(M3) Denver	Enterprise Center; Attendance: 16,814

Game reference

Hampton Slukynsky
Goalies
Matt Davis
Referees:
Jeremy Tufts
Geoff Miller
Linesmen:
Kevin Briganti
Nick Briganti

(Washe) Brian Kramer (2) – PP – 26:16	1–0
(unassisted) Owen Michaels (15) – 34:32	2–0
	2–1	46:49 – Aidan Thompson (21) (Ashcroft, Brown)
	2–2	57:21 – Jared Wright (21) (Pohlkamp)
(Costantini, Väisänen) Owen Michaels (16) – GW – 80:26	3–2

4 min
Penalties
6 min
47
Shots
22

Game summary
Western started fast, causing a turnover in front of the benches and then attacking Denver's cage. After the puck was thrown behind the net, it bounce out the other side, forcing Matt Davis to make a tough save. He was unable to control the rebound and the puck hopped out into the open. Davis then slipped and was unable to regain the net. Zach Nehring had a wide open shot at the goal but the puck was on edge and his shot hit the crossbar and bounced away harmlessly. The pace cooled down afterwards as both teams appeared a bit nervous, particularly after the fireworks in the first minute. Only 2 shots were recorded in the first 5 minutes between the two clubs as the two NCHC rivals probed one another for weaknesses. The defenses on both sides was effective on the backcheck, melting down attacks by both sides and stopping any shots from getting on goal for several minutes. By the middle of the period, there were only 3 shots on goal in what was a tight-checking affair to that point. In the back half of the period the game began to open up and, within a minute, Kieran Cebrian was called for boarding to give Western Michigan the game's first power play. The Broncos were able to set up immediately and put pressure on the Denver goal but after a few saves from Davis, the Pioneers were able to clear the zone. After setting up a second time, Western was able to put the puck on goal several more times but Davis managed to stop all 5 shots on the power play. After killing off the penalty, Denver began to attack and were able to generate their first real scoring chance at about the 15-minute mark. Hampton Slukynsky was able to close his five-hole in time and send the Broncos up the ice on a counterattack. Western's shot was stopped by Davis but he was unable to find the puck. Fortunately for Denver, the rubber dropped straight down and when WMU took a shot at the loose puck it was easily stopped by Davis' left pad. During the ensuing play, there was a bit of a comical moment when several players got into a rugby scrum just inside the Denver blueline. With the puck pinned to the boards, the players locked their skated together stat stationary for several seconds. The referees yelled at them that they were not blowing the whistle and forced the two sides to sort the situation out for themselves. About a minute later, Alex Bump was able to get a hard one-timer on goal from the top of the circle but Davis made a spectacular glove save and kept the game scoreless. After a bit of back-and-forth, Eric Pohlkamp grabbed the puck and weaved his way through half a dozen skaters and fired a hard shot that Slukynsky stopped. The attempt came with just seconds to play in the period and was only Denver's third shot of the frame.

Western again got a jump on the puck at the start of the second. Bump's fourth shot of the game hit Davis in the mask, knocking it loose and drawing a whistle. Denver tried to get their offense going in response but the pressure by WMU at both ends of the ice prevented the Pioneers from holding the puck long enough to generate a scoring chance. After forcing a turnover in the Denver end, Western Michigan threatened Davis once more but Denver's was quickly able to recover. As the play continued, Bump was handed a slashing call to give Denver its first opportunity on the man-advantage. With the #3 power play in the nation, Denver had a glorious chance to get the game's opening goal, however, Western Michigan was no slouch on special teams with the #4 penalty kill. The Pioneers were able to spend most of the time in the WMU end but the Broncos were largely able to keep Denver to the outside. A little after the penalty expired, Samu Salminen took a rather poor holding penalty behind his own net and put Western back on the power play. Poor puck management cost Western Michigan the first 30 seconds of the power play but after Denver's clearing attempt went into the bench, Western got a reprieve and scored off the ensuing faceoff into the far corner. Brian Kramer, a graduate transfer, scored just his scored goal of the year from the high slot to give WMU the first lead of the match. Western did not let up after the goal and continued to press Denver all over the ice. Just before the middle of the period, the puck came to the front of the Denver cage and was stopped by Davis. The netminder was then pushed into the goal and Western began celebrating a second tally, however, the referees immediately ruled the play dead. Upon review, the call was upheld and the score remained 1–0. Western Michigan continued to besiege Davis and kept the Pioneers on their heels. After a few minutes, Denver was able to get a lucky bounce and get a couple of open looks no goal but Slukynsky was able to stop both Aidan Thompson and Jared Wright. A few minutes later, Zeev Buium was retrieving a puck behind his net with Wyatt Schingoethe hot on his heels. When Buium tried to avoid the check, Schingoethe's leg caught him in the ankle and caused the speedy defenseman to crumple to the ice. Buium was able to skate off under his own power but was definitely feeling the effects of the hit. Moments later, as Denver was trying to exit their zone, Bump laid his stick on Thompson, knocking him to the ice. While Denver was yelling for a penalty, the puck slid right to Owen Michaels. The sophomore skated in a few feet and launched a shot by Davis' ear right into the far corner for the second goal of the game. During the ensuing play, Tim Washe was sent in on Davis with a breakaway but the Denver goaltender kept his team in the match by making the save. After the following faceoff, Iiro Hakkarainen was called for hooking to give Denver's man-advantage a second opportunity. Despite good puck movement, Denver was not able to get a shot on goal. Instead, Matteo Costantini was able to turn the puck over at his own blueline and break in on Davis. The netminder was forced to make two massive saves on the Ontario native as well as another later from Washe and a further chance by Bump just as the penalty was expiring. Western ended up outshooting the Pioneers while on the penalty kill as a demonstration of just how in control of the game the Broncos were. Even when Denver was able to get a turnover late in the period, WMU's defense was able to quickly respond and stop the puck before it got to the net. At the end of 40 minutes, Western led with 32 shots to just 8 for Denver.

With Denver in a precarious position, the team altered their style of play by leaning more towards the offensive end. The Pioneers were able to generate a decent scoring chance in the first minute of the period, but they also opened up their zone for Western's offense. in the third minute, that resulted in the Broncos getting another chance on goal where Davis was unable to control the rebound but fortune remained with the Pioneer netminder and the puck remained between his legs. Denver's counter resulted in another shot on Slukynsky but no follow up. Just prior to the 5-minute mark, Hagen Burrows clipped Michaels in the helmet with his stick and gave Western a third power play. The Broncos did not have the same urgency as they had on their first two chances and Denver managed to kill off the penalty with relative ease. Shortly afterwards, Denver was able to get into the WMU zone with possession and move the puck around to Thompson in the right circle. His initial shot was blocked by Samuel Sjölund but the rebound came right back to Thompson and he sent a fluttering shot past an over-extended Slukynsky to cut the lead in half. The goal appeared to breathe life back into the Pioneers and Denver suddenly began to pressure Western. After a little more back-and-forth, Denver got into the WMU end past the midpoint of the period and got several good looks at the net but were unable to get the puck past Slukynsky. Denver continued to search and probe for the tying goal but the Bronco defenders continued to hold them off. As time kept ticking away on Denver's season, the Pioneers were constantly on the attack and, with less then 3 minutes to play, Pohlkamp fired a hard shot on goal from the top of the circle. Slukynsky made the initial save but the puck bounced out and dropped into the crease. In a melee of four skaters, Wright was able to poke the puck between Slukynsky's legs and tie the game. However, Western challenged for goaltender interference, believing that Slukynsky had been pushed just prior to the goal. After a review, the goal was allowed to stand much to the displeasure of the Broncos. With the game not tied, Western Michigan now had to rouse its offense that had taken off most of the third period. Denver remained on the attack, looking for the winning goal in regulation. Neither side was able to find the back of the net again and, for the third consecutive meeting, the two would need overtime to settle the account.

Denver took charge at the start of overtime but Western was able to prevent any good scoring chance from occurring. Through a combination of backchecking and shot-blocking, the Pioneers were unable to get a puck on goal for the first few minutes but were still directing the pace of play. As the period progressed, Western Michigan slowly took charge and began to tilt the ice back towards Davis. Denver continued to fight back but the Broncos were able to find Bump right in front of the net at the 8-minute mark but when he slapped at the loose puck it was fluttering in the air and went well wide of the half-open cage. A few minutes later, Denver was able to get a long shot on goal and force Slukynsky to save the rebound. The puck then was laying right in front of the goal but Western jumped on the puck and skated it out of danger. A short time later, Buium danced through the entire WMU defense but his shot was blocked by Cole Crusberg-Roseen. On the counterattack, Buium then deflected a shot from Michaels that nearly found its way into his own cage. About a minute later, Western nearly ended the game when Washe tried to find Hakkarainen in off to the side of the net. The puck was stopped by the skate of Rieger Lorenz but was then almost slid under a sprawling Davis before he managed to cover and freeze the puck. The pace picked up with both teams trying to end the match quickly but the two netminders were not accommodating. The two sides exchanged scoring chances for several minutes but could not get the puck into the net. With about 2 minutes to play, Buium was again involved in a collision where he attempted to avoid a check but was caught in the leg. Denver again screamed for a penalty but none was forthcoming. Western was able to get a 2-on-1 as a result but Davis made the save on Bump. In the end, 80 minutes was not enough and for the first time in 29 years, a Frozen Four game went into double overtime.

Western was able to get control of the puck at the start of the fifth period and, less than 30 seconds into the frame, Costantini found Michaels in the high slot for the winning goal.

=== National Championship ===
April 12, 2024; 6:30 pm	Western Michigan	6–2 (2–1, 1–1, 3–0)	Boston University	Enterprise Center; Attendance: 16,953

Game reference
Referees: Cameron Lynch; CJ Hanafin; Linesmen: John Rey; Patrick Dapuzzo

Scoring summary
Period	Team	Goal	Assist(s)	Time	Score
1st	WMU	Wyatt Schingoethe (5)	Hakkarainen, Washe	1:38	1–0 WMU
1st	BU	Cole Eiserman (25)	Kaplan, Bednarik	7:12	1–1
1st	WMU	Cole Crusberg-Roseen (3)	unassisted	15:01	2–1 WMU
2nd	WMU	Ty Henricks (8) – GW	Knuble, Szydlowski	25:18	3–1 WMU
2nd	BU	Shane Lachance (12) – PP	Greene, C. Hutson	30:42	3–2 WMU
3rd	WMU	Owen Michaels (17)	Väisänen	47:16	4–2 WMU
3rd	WMU	Iiro Hakkarainen (13)	Schingoethe, Washe	56:02	5–2 WMU
3rd	WMU	Owen Michaels (18) – EN		57:52	6–2 WMU
Penalty summary
Period	Team	Player	Penalty	Time	PIM
1st	BU	Quinn Hutson	Hooking	9:33	2:00
2nd	WMU	Brian Kramer	Holding	30:26	2:00
2nd	WMU	Ty Henricks	Slashing	35:40	2:00
2nd	BU	Devin Kaplan	Kneeing	38:14	2:00

Shots by period
Team	1	2	3	T
Western Michigan	9	9	10	28
Boston University	8	8	10	26

Goaltenders
Team	Name	Saves	Goals against	Time on ice
WMU	Hampton Slukynsky	24	2	59:26
BU	Mikhail Yegorov	22	5	58:21

Game summary

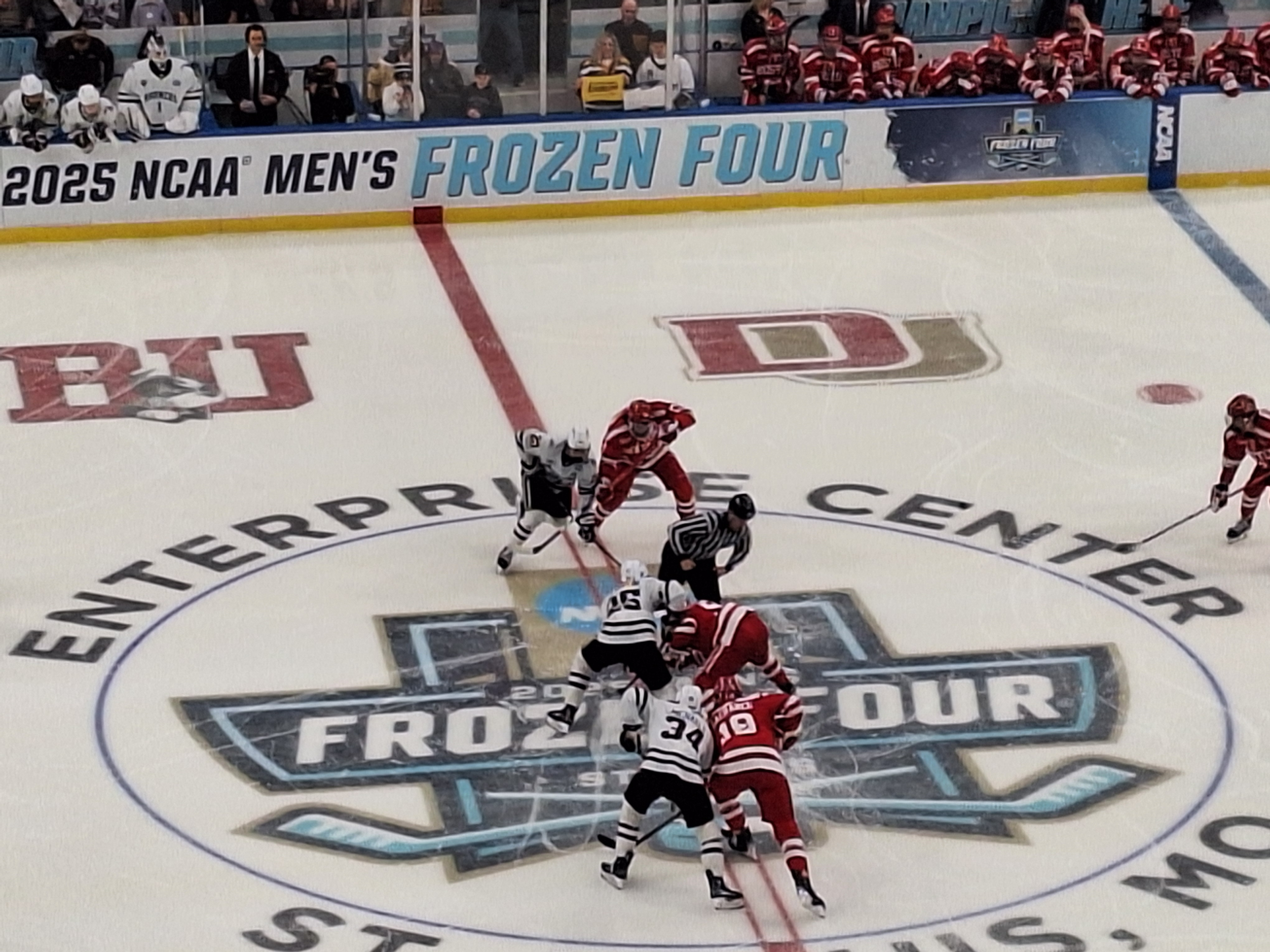
Opening face-off from the finals

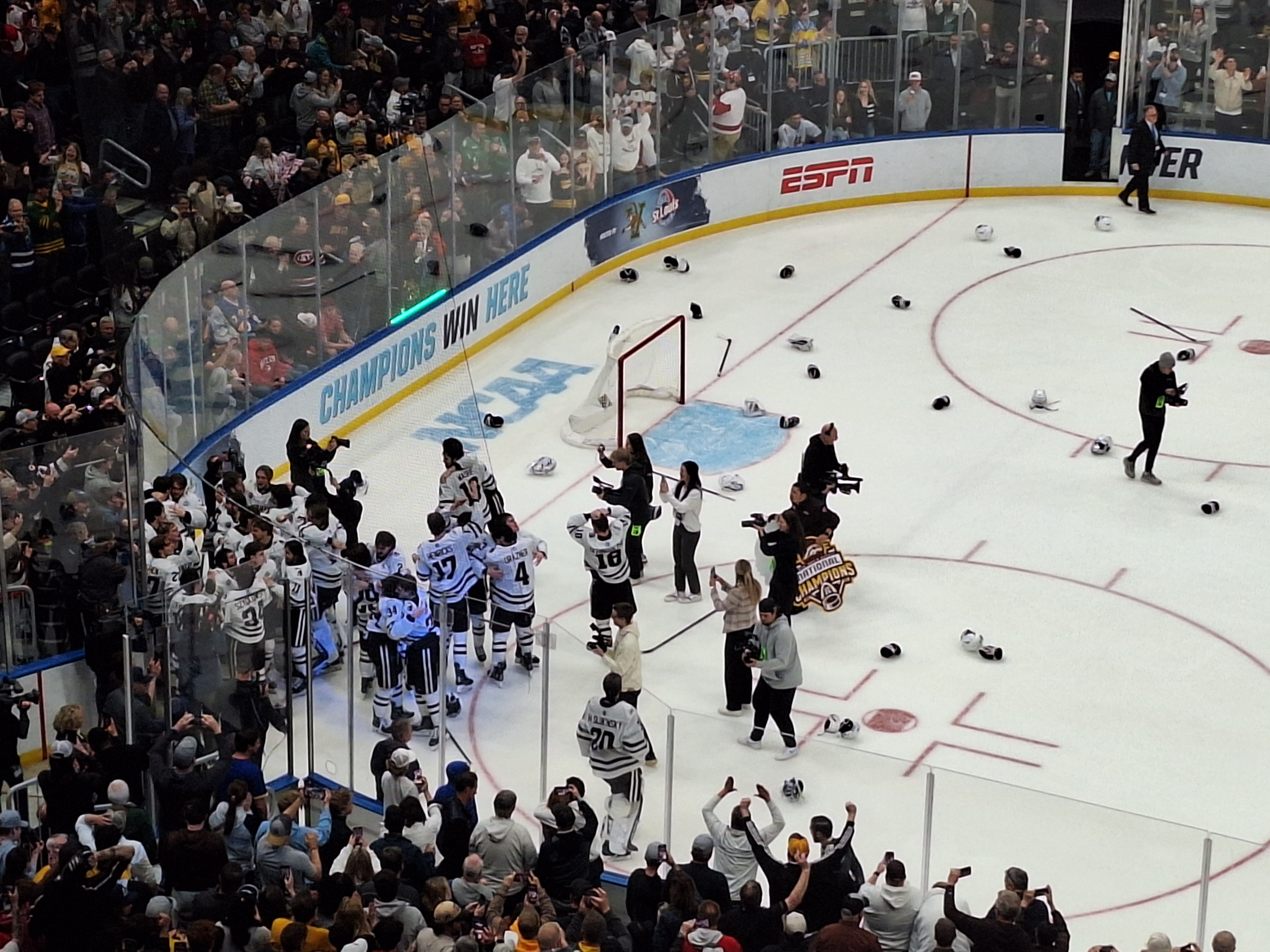
Post-game celebration

== Scoring statistics ==
Name	Position	Games	Goals	Assists	Points	PIM
Alex Bump	LW	42	23	24	47	14
Tim Washe	C/LW	42	16	22	38	18
Owen Michaels	F	42	18	18	36	6
Grant Slukynsky	C	42	10	26	36	2
Liam Valente	C/LW	42	14	19	33	10
Zach Nehring	RW	42	13	17	30	29
Iiro Hakkarainen	LW/RW	42	13	16	29	21
Samuel Sjolund	D	42	4	25	29	18
Joona Väisänen	D	42	4	22	26	12
Matteo Costantini	C/LW	40	8	15	23	20
Brian Kramer	D	42	2	15	17	16
Cam Knuble	F	41	5	10	15	4
Tristan Lemyre	C	42	6	8	14	16
Robby Drazner	D	42	5	9	14	6
Ty Henricks	LW	41	8	5	13	8
Cole Crusberg-Roseen	D	42	3	9	12	10
Wyatt Schingoethe	C	31	5	6	11	2
Garrett Szydlowski	RW	39	3	7	10	4
Zack Sharp	D	42	5	4	9	12
Ethan Wolthers	F	9	2	2	4	2
Cameron Rowe	G	17	0	1	1	0
Hampton Slukynsky	G	25	0	1	1	0
Zach Bade	F	2	0	0	0	2
Ean Somoza	F	4	0	0	0	0
Jack Mesic	D	5	0	0	0	0
Bench	–	–	–	–	–	8
Total			167	281	4485	240

== Goaltending statistics ==
Name	Games	Minutes	Wins	Losses	Ties	Goals against	Saves	Shut-outs	SV %	GAA
Hampton Slukynsky	25	1578:30	19	5	1	50	593	1	.922	1.90
Cameron Rowe	17	1019:16	15	2	0	34	415	1	.924	2.00
Empty Net	-	12:17	-	-	-	2	-	-	-	-
Total	42	2610:03	34	7	1	86	1008	2	.921	1.98

== Rankings ==
Poll	Week																											
Poll	Pre	1	2	3	4	5	6	7	8	9	10	11	12	13	14	15	16	17	18	19	20	21	22	23	24	25	26	27 (Final)
USCHO.com	17	17	17	14	13	14	13	9	7	7	6	6	–	4	4	4	3	3 (1)	4	3	3 (16)	4 (1)	4 (1)	3	3 (5)	3 (5)	–	1 (50)
USA Hockey	15	17	16	13	14	13	11т	9	7	7	6	6	–	4	5	5	4	3	4	4	3 (1)	4 (1)	5	3	3 (1)	3 (1)	1 (20)	1 (34)

Note: USCHO did not release a poll in week 12 or 26.
Note: USA Hockey did not release a poll in week 12.

== Awards and honors ==
Player	Award	Ref
Pat Ferschweiler	Spencer Penrose Award	
Owen Michaels	NCAA Tournament Most Outstanding Player	
Alex Bump	AHCA All-American West First Team	
Alex Bump	NCHC Forward of the Year	
Tim Washe	NCHC Defensive Forward of the Year	
Pat Ferschweiler	Herb Brooks Coach of the Year	
Alex Bump	Frozen Faceoff MVP	
Alex Bump	All-NCHC First Team	
Hampton Slukynsky	All-NCHC Second Team	
Luke Grainger	All-NCHC Second Team	
Cameron Rowe	All-NCHC Third Team	
Joona Väisänen	All-NCHC Third Team	
Hampton Slukynsky	NCHC All-Rookie Team	
Joona Väisänen	NCHC All-Rookie Team	
Joona Väisänen	NCHC Frozen Faceoff All-Tournament Team	
Alex Bump	NCHC Frozen Faceoff All-Tournament Team	
Hampton Slukynsky	NCAA All-Tournament team	
Joona Väisänen	NCAA All-Tournament team	
Owen Michaels	NCAA All-Tournament team	
Tim Washe	NCAA All-Tournament team	

== 2025 NHL entry draft ==
Round	Pick	Player	NHL team
4	124	Zach Sharp	San Jose Sharks

† incoming freshman
