= 1997–98 NCAA Division III men's ice hockey season =

- Duration: October 1997– March 21, 1998
- NCAA tournament: 1998
- National championship: Ronald B. Stafford Ice Arena; Plattsburgh, New York
- NCAA champion: Middlebury
- Sid Watson Award: Mark Spence (Middlebury)

The 1997–98 NCAA Division III men's ice hockey season began in October 1997 and concluded on March 21 of the following year. This was the 25th season of Division III college ice hockey.

Quinnipiac and Fairfield began the season as members of ECAC North/South/Central, however, because the teams were preparing to be founding members of the MAAC's ice hockey conference the following year they had begun to offer athletic scholarships. Conference rules strictly forbade any athletic scholarships, and both schools (in December and February respectively) were ruled ineligible to play in the conference postseason. Additionally, all games played by Fairfield and Quinnipiac would not be counted in the conference standings. Sacred Heart was also excluded from ECAC tournament play for similar reasons. Though the three teams were officially members of ECAC North/South/Central, they are sometimes considered as independents for this season as a result of not playing any conference games.

== Regular season ==
=== Season tournaments ===
| Tournament | Dates | Teams | Champion |
|---|---|---|---|
| Blue Devil Invitational | October 24–25 | 4 | Mercyhurst |
| Pepsi Invitational | October 31–November 1 | 4 | Potsdam State |
| RIT Tournament | October 31–November 1 | 4 | RIT |
| Pane Webber Face Off Classic | November 7–8 | 4 | Fitchburg State |
| Holy Cross Tournament | November 28–29 | 4 | |
| Ben McCabe Tournament | November 29–30 | 4 | |
| Syracuse Invitational | December 27–28 | 4 | Minnesota–Duluth |
| Codfish Bowl | December 29–30 | 4 | Massachusetts–Boston |
| Cardinal Classic | January 2–3 | 4 | Plattsburgh State |
| Colby Tournament | January 3–4 | 4 | RIT |
| Middlebury Tournament | January 3–4 | 4 | Middlebury |
| Hamot Hockey Classic | January 9–10 | 4 | Mercyhurst |

=== Standings ===
1997–98 ECAC East standings
| | Conference | | | | | | | Overall | | | | | |
| | GP | W | L | T | PTS | GF | GA | GP | W | L | T | GF | GA |
|---|---|---|---|---|---|---|---|---|---|---|---|---|---|
| Middlebury † | 19 | 16 | 1 | 2 | 34 | 108 | 23 | 28 | 24 | 2 | 2 | 152 | 42 |
| Williams | 19 | 16 | 2 | 1 | 33 | 75 | 36 | 24 | 18 | 5 | 1 | | |
| Holy Cross | 19 | 13 | 4 | 2 | 28 | 69 | 41 | 26 | 16 | 8 | 2 | 97 | 58 |
| Connecticut College | 19 | 11 | 5 | 3 | 25 | 81 | 63 | 27 | 14 | 10 | 3 | 107 | 92 |
| Hamilton * | 19 | 11 | 5 | 3 | 25 | 83 | 55 | 27 | 16 | 8 | 3 | | |
| Bowdoin | 19 | 11 | 6 | 2 | 24 | 73 | 57 | 25 | 13 | 10 | 2 | | |
| Salem State | 19 | 11 | 6 | 2 | 24 | 65 | 59 | 27 | 15 | 10 | 2 | | |
| Colby | 19 | 10 | 6 | 3 | 23 | 61 | 51 | 24 | 13 | 8 | 3 | | |
| Connecticut | 19 | 10 | 8 | 1 | 21 | 66 | 57 | 27 | 13 | 13 | 1 | 86 | 96 |
| Babson | 19 | 9 | 8 | 2 | 20 | 56 | 54 | 25 | 14 | 9 | 2 | 81 | 69 |
| Norwich | 19 | 9 | 8 | 2 | 20 | 85 | 58 | 27 | 13 | 12 | 2 | | |
| Trinity | 19 | 9 | 8 | 2 | 20 | 71 | 72 | 24 | 11 | 11 | 2 | | |
| Amherst | 19 | 8 | 10 | 1 | 17 | 69 | 65 | 23 | 10 | 12 | 1 | | |
| Saint Anselm | 19 | 8 | 11 | 0 | 16 | 74 | 81 | 24 | 11 | 13 | 0 | 91 | 97 |
| Southern Maine | 19 | 5 | 13 | 1 | 11 | 58 | 111 | 24 | 6 | 17 | 1 | 78 | 141 |
| Massachusetts–Boston | 19 | 5 | 14 | 0 | 10 | 61 | 81 | 24 | 7 | 17 | 0 | 83 | 99 |
| Wesleyan | 19 | 4 | 13 | 2 | 10 | 50 | 92 | 23 | 6 | 15 | 2 | 69 | 111 |
| New England College | 19 | 3 | 13 | 3 | 9 | 59 | 101 | 24 | 6 | 15 | 3 | | |
| American International | 19 | 3 | 15 | 1 | 7 | 51 | 90 | 24 | 5 | 18 | 1 | | |
| MCLA | 19 | 1 | 17 | 1 | 3 | 61 | 119 | 25 | 4 | 20 | 1 | | |
Championship: March 7, 1998 † indicates conference regular season champion * indicates conference tournament champion

1997–98 ECAC North/South/Central standings
| | Division | | | | | | | Overall | | | | | |
| | GP | W | L | T | Pct. | GF | GA | GP | W | L | T | GF | GA |
Central Division
| Saint Michael's ~ | 14 | 12 | 2 | 0 | 24 | 98 | 48 | 27 | 20 | 7 | 0 | 171 | 91 |
| Massachusetts–Dartmouth * | 14 | 11 | 3 | 0 | 22 | | | 27 | 22 | 5 | 0 | | |
| Bentley | 14 | 10 | 4 | 0 | 20 | 106 | 51 | 26 | 16 | 10 | 0 | 158 | 107 |
| New Hampshire College | 14 | 9 | 5 | 0 | 18 | 76 | 68 | 24 | 14 | 9 | 1 | 111 | 103 |
| Assumption | 14 | 7 | 7 | 0 | 14 | | | 24 | 11 | 13 | 0 | | |
| Tufts | 14 | 5 | 9 | 0 | 10 | | | 23 | 9 | 13 | 1 | | |
| Stonehill | 14 | 1 | 12 | 1 | 3 | | | 21 | 1 | 19 | 1 | | |
| Suffolk | 14 | 0 | 13 | 1 | 1 | | | 25 | 5 | 19 | 1 | | |
North Division
| Fitchburg State ~† | 16 | 14 | 1 | 1 | 29 | | | 27 | 21 | 5 | 1 | | |
| Johnson & Wales | 16 | 12 | 4 | 0 | 24 | 85 | 58 | 19 | 12 | 7 | 0 | 91 | 76 |
| Worcester State | 16 | 11 | 5 | 0 | 22 | | | 25 | 13 | 12 | 0 | | |
| Plymouth State | 16 | 9 | 6 | 1 | 19 | 74 | 61 | 26 | 11 | 14 | 1 | 104 | 126 |
| Framingham State | 16 | 9 | 7 | 0 | 18 | | | 24 | 12 | 12 | 0 | | |
| Curry | 16 | 7 | 9 | 0 | 14 | | | 25 | 11 | 13 | 1 | | |
| Nichols | 16 | 7 | 9 | 0 | 14 | 83 | 76 | 20 | 7 | 12 | 1 | 90 | 105 |
| Roger Williams | 16 | 2 | 14 | 0 | 4 | | | | | | | | |
| Salve Regina | 16 | 0 | 16 | 0 | 0 | | | 17 | 0 | 17 | 0 | | |
South Division
| Wentworth ~ | 8 | 7 | 1 | 0 | 14 | 26 | 11 | 27 | 17 | 10 | 0 | 102 | 86 |
| Skidmore | 8 | 5 | 2 | 1 | 11 | | | 23 | 8 | 12 | 3 | | |
| Iona | 8 | 4 | 3 | 1 | 9 | | | 25 | 4 | 20 | 1 | | |
| Villanova | 8 | 2 | 6 | 0 | 4 | | | | | | | | |
| Western New England | 8 | 1 | 7 | 0 | 2 | | | 17 | 7 | 10 | 0 | | |
| Fairfield ^ | 0 | - | - | - | - | - | - | 24 | 12 | 12 | 0 | | |
| Quinnipiac ^ | 0 | - | - | - | - | - | - | 23 | 19 | 3 | 1 | 166 | 52 |
| Sacred Heart ^ | 0 | - | - | - | - | - | - | 25 | 13 | 12 | 0 | 95 | 135 |
Championship: March 11, 1998; ~ indicates division regular season champions † indicates conference regular season champion * indicates conference tournament champion^ Fairfield and Quinnipiac were ruled ineligible for postseason play and their divisional games were not counted in conference standings as a result of both schools offering athletic scholarships. Sacred Heart was excluded for similar reasons.

1997–98 ECAC West standings
| | Conference | | | | | | | Overall | | | | | |
| | GP | W | L | T | PTS | GF | GA | GP | W | L | T | GF | GA |
|---|---|---|---|---|---|---|---|---|---|---|---|---|---|
| Niagara †* | 10 | 8 | 1 | 1 | 17 | 50 | 24 | 27 | 14 | 10 | 3 | 106 | 80 |
| RIT | 10 | 7 | 1 | 2 | 16 | 64 | 23 | 29 | 20 | 4 | 5 | 163 | 82 |
| Mercyhurst | 10 | 4 | 5 | 1 | 9 | 35 | 36 | 27 | 17 | 9 | 1 | 123 | 79 |
| Canisius | 10 | 4 | 5 | 1 | 9 | 34 | 48 | 26 | 11 | 11 | 4 | 117 | 115 |
| Elmira | 10 | 4 | 6 | 0 | 8 | 29 | 37 | 25 | 14 | 11 | 0 | 105 | 93 |
| Hobart | 10 | 0 | 9 | 1 | 1 | 18 | 62 | 24 | 9 | 14 | 1 | 80 | 116 |
Championship: March 7, 1998 † indicates conference regular season champion * indicates conference tournament champions

1997–98 NCAA Division III Independent ice hockey standings
| | Overall record | | | | | |
| | GP | W | L | T | GF | GA |
|---|---|---|---|---|---|---|
| Lawrence | 10 | 7 | 3 | 0 | | |
| Scranton | 24 | 16 | 8 | 0 | | |

1997–98 Minnesota Intercollegiate Athletic Conference ice hockey standings
| | Conference | | | | | | | Overall | | | | | |
| | GP | W | L | T | Pts | GF | GA | GP | W | L | T | GF | GA |
|---|---|---|---|---|---|---|---|---|---|---|---|---|---|
| St. Thomas † | 16 | 12 | 3 | 1 | 25 | 94 | 41 | 29 | 20 | 7 | 2 | | |
| Augsburg †* | 16 | 12 | 3 | 1 | 25 | 95 | 51 | 33 | 21 | 8 | 4 | 157 | 115 |
| Saint John's | 16 | 12 | 4 | 0 | 24 | 95 | 48 | 27 | 17 | 10 | 0 | | |
| Gustavus Adolphus | 16 | 11 | 4 | 1 | 23 | 86 | 45 | 27 | 13 | 12 | 2 | 123 | 106 |
| Saint Mary's | 16 | 9 | 7 | 0 | 18 | 74 | 48 | 25 | 14 | 11 | 0 | 112 | 80 |
| Concordia (MN) | 16 | 7 | 8 | 1 | 15 | 58 | 61 | 25 | 10 | 14 | 1 | 87 | 105 |
| St. Olaf | 16 | 4 | 12 | 0 | 8 | 54 | 70 | 25 | 5 | 18 | 2 | | |
| Bethel | 16 | 3 | 13 | 0 | 6 | 45 | 83 | 25 | 8 | 17 | 0 | | |
| Hamline | 16 | 0 | 16 | 0 | 0 | 23 | 165 | 25 | 1 | 24 | 0 | | |
Championship: March 7, 1998 † indicates conference regular season champion * indicates conference tournament champion

1997–98 Northern Collegiate Hockey Association standings
| | Conference | | | | | | | Overall | | | | | |
| | GP | W | L | T | Pts | GF | GA | GP | W | L | T | GF | GA |
|---|---|---|---|---|---|---|---|---|---|---|---|---|---|
| St. Norbert †* | 20 | 17 | 3 | 0 | 34 | 114 | 45 | 33 | 27 | 6 | 0 | 187 | 63 |
| Wisconsin–River Falls | 20 | 14 | 5 | 1 | 29 | 79 | 50 | 31 | 22 | 8 | 1 | 124 | 77 |
| Bemidji State | 20 | 14 | 6 | 0 | 28 | 107 | 64 | 34 | 22 | 10 | 2 | 168 | 110 |
| Wisconsin–Stevens Point | 20 | 14 | 6 | 0 | 28 | 70 | 52 | 34 | 23 | 11 | 0 | 114 | 82 |
| Wisconsin–Superior | 20 | 14 | 6 | 0 | 28 | 91 | 49 | 29 | 18 | 10 | 1 | 125 | 80 |
| Wisconsin–Eau Claire | 20 | 6 | 14 | 0 | 12 | 81 | 105 | 26 | 10 | 16 | 0 | 113 | 122 |
| Lake Forest | 20 | 5 | 13 | 2 | 12 | 56 | 94 | 27 | 7 | 18 | 2 | 83 | 124 |
| Wisconsin–Stout | 20 | 3 | 16 | 1 | 7 | 68 | 110 | 27 | 7 | 19 | 1 | 98 | 141 |
| St. Scholastica | 20 | 1 | 19 | 0 | 2 | 34 | 132 | 27 | 3 | 23 | 1 | 62 | 173 |
Championship: March 7, 1998 † indicates conference regular season champion * indicates conference tournament champion Bemidji State was ineligible for Division III tournaments

1997–98 State University of New York Athletic Conference ice hockey standings
| | Conference | | | | | | | Overall | | | | | |
| | GP | W | L | T | PTS | GF | GA | GP | W | L | T | GF | GA |
|---|---|---|---|---|---|---|---|---|---|---|---|---|---|
| Oswego State † | 14 | 11 | 2 | 1 | 23 | 74 | 33 | 31 | 16 | 13 | 2 | 138 | 117 |
| Geneseo State | 14 | 9 | 3 | 2 | 20 | 53 | 44 | 27 | 17 | 7 | 3 | | |
| Plattsburgh State * | 14 | 9 | 4 | 1 | 19 | 79 | 42 | 35 | 26 | 8 | 1 | 193 | 99 |
| Potsdam State | 14 | 8 | 4 | 2 | 18 | 74 | 47 | 28 | 15 | 10 | 3 | | |
| Brockport State | 14 | 7 | 6 | 1 | 14 | 53 | 60 | 28 | 11 | 14 | 3 | 116 | 133 |
| Fredonia State | 14 | 5 | 9 | 0 | 10 | 46 | 55 | 28 | 10 | 15 | 3 | | |
| Buffalo State | 14 | 2 | 9 | 3 | 7 | 35 | 72 | 24 | 3 | 18 | 3 | | |
| Cortland State | 14 | 0 | 14 | 0 | 0 | 24 | 85 | 23 | 3 | 20 | 0 | | |
Championship: March 7, 1998 † indicates conference regular season champion * indicates conference tournament champions

Note: Mini-game are not included in final standings

== 1998 NCAA Tournament ==
Quarterfinals; March 14–15
Middlebury | 5 | 6 | -
Oswego State | 1 | 3 | -
Augsburg | 3 | 4 | -
Wisconsin–River Falls | 2 | 3 | -
Plattsburgh State | 6 | 2 | 2
RIT | 3 | 3 | 0
St. Norbert | 3 | 1 | 0
Wisconsin–Stevens Point | 1 | 2 | 2

Semifinals; March 21
Middlebury | 5
Augsburg | 2
Plattsburgh State | 2
Wisconsin–Stevens Point | 8

National championship March 22
Middlebury | 2
Wisconsin–Stevens Point | 1
Third-place game
Augsburg | 5
Plattsburgh State | 9

Note: * denotes overtime period(s)

== See also ==
- 1997–98 NCAA Division I men's ice hockey season
- 1997–98 NCAA Division II men's ice hockey season
