= Justin Johnson (ice hockey) =

American ice hockey player (born 1981)

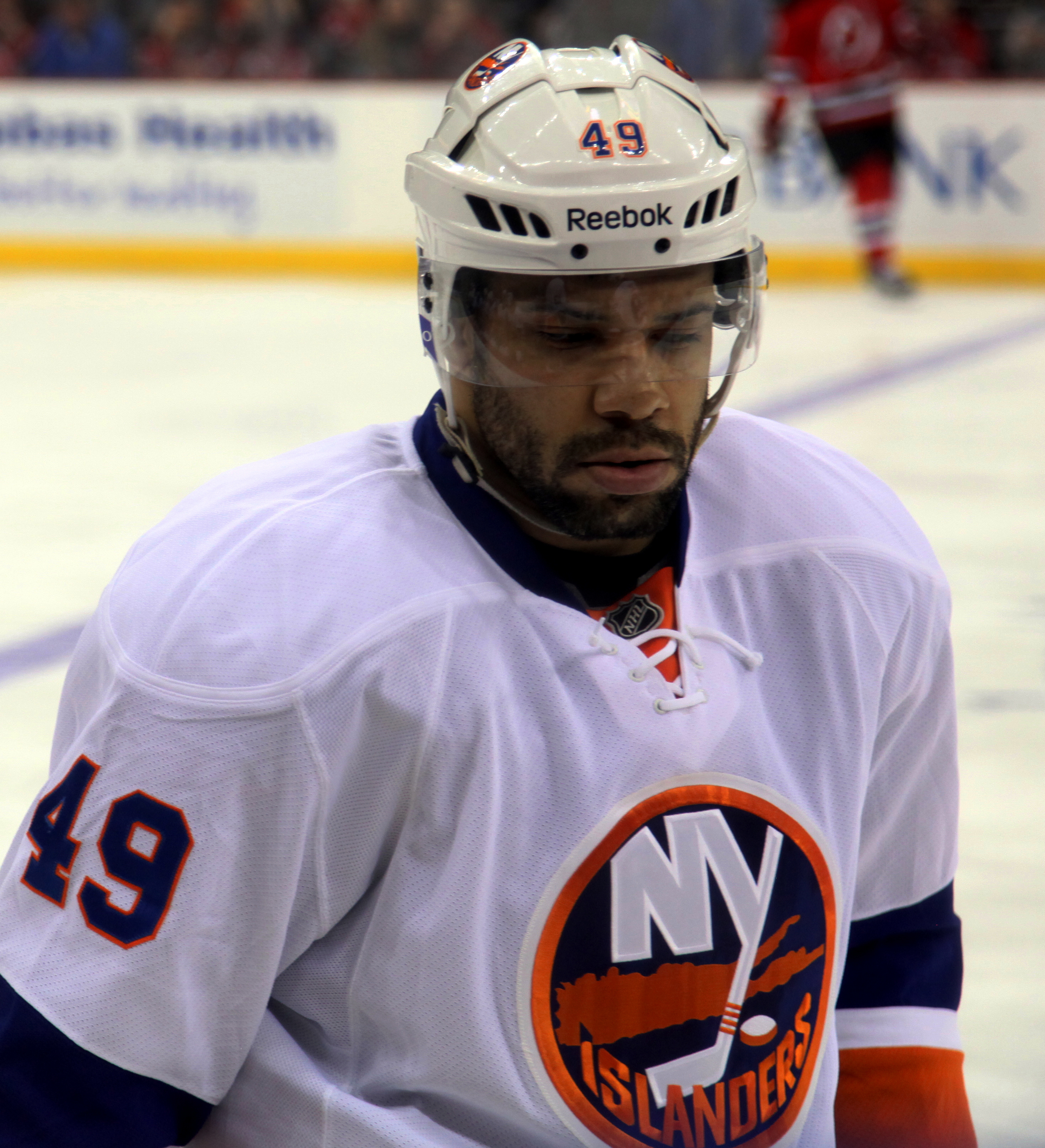
- Johnson in 2014 with the New York Islanders
- Born: May 5, 1981 (age 44) Anchorage, Alaska, U.S.
- Height: 6 ft 1 in (185 cm)
- Weight: 220 lb (100 kg; 15 st 10 lb)
- Position: Right wing
- Shot: Right
- Played for: New York Islanders
- NHL draft: Undrafted
- Playing career: 2006–2016

Justin A. Johnson (born May 5, 1981) is an American former ice hockey player. He last played with the Toronto Marlies of the American Hockey League (AHL). Johnson played two games in the National Hockey League with the New York Islanders during the 2013–14 NHL season.

== Playing career ==
Following four years with the Alaska Anchorage Seawolves, Johnson began his professional career with the Alaska Aces near the end of the 2005–06 ECHL season.

On October 7, 2010, the Manchester Monarchs signed Johnson to a professional tryout agreement. On August 5, 2011, Johnson was re-signed to a two-year contract extension with the Monarchs. On August 2, 2013, the Bridgeport Sound Tigers signed Johnson to a one-year AHL contract.

In the following 2013–14 season, Johnson was a fixture on the Sound Tigers in adding toughness to the forward lines. On March 3, 2013, Johnson was signed to an NHL contract with parent affiliate, the New York Islanders, for the remainder of the campaign.

On April 11, 2014, at the age of 32, Johnson made his long-awaited NHL debut against the New Jersey Devils at the Prudential Center. Johnson made the best of his call-up to the big leagues, scoring a knockdown of the considerably bigger John Scott two days later in the Islanders' final game of the season. In his retirement essay written for The Players' Tribune in 2016, Scott acknowledged the fight as the only clean loss of his NHL career, congratulating Johnson.

Johnson went into the off-season as a free agent. Unable to garner another NHL contract, on September 23, 2014, the Alaska Aces of the ECHL signed Johnson to a one-year deal allowing him to return to his hometown team.

On July 26, 2015, with the Toronto Marlies in need of a physical presence within the organization, Johnson returned to the AHL on a one-year contract.

== Career statistics ==
			Regular season					Playoffs
Season	Team	League	GP	G	A	Pts	PIM	GP	G	A	Pts	PIM
2001–02	Omaha Lancers	USHL	46	7	8	15	36	10	2	1	3	11
2002–03	Alaska Anchorage Seawolves	WCHA	33	3	5	8	12	—	—	—	—	—
2003–04	Alaska Anchorage Seawolves	WCHA	38	2	10	12	31	—	—	—	—	—
2004–05	Alaska Anchorage Seawolves	WCHA	36	4	4	8	55	—	—	—	—	—
2005–06	Alaska Anchorage Seawolves	WCHA	36	4	3	7	49	—	—	—	—	—
2005–06	Alaska Aces	ECHL	4	0	1	1	9	—	—	—	—	—
2006–07	Alaska Aces	ECHL	4	0	0	0	7	—	—	—	—	—
2006–07	Idaho Steelheads	ECHL	12	0	1	1	27	—	—	—	—	—
2007–08	Utah Grizzlies	ECHL	57	8	3	11	118	6	0	0	0	12
2008–09	Utah Grizzlies	ECHL	16	1	0	1	51	—	—	—	—	—
2008–09	Cincinnati Cyclones	ECHL	43	12	10	22	208	13	2	4	6	26
2009–10	Alaska Aces	ECHL	54	3	4	7	249	—	—	—	—	—
2010–11	Manchester Monarchs	AHL	47	3	5	8	186	4	0	0	0	4
2011–12	Manchester Monarchs	AHL	44	1	2	3	187	1	0	0	0	2
2012–13	Manchester Monarchs	AHL	12	0	0	0	19	—	—	—	—	—
2013–14	Bridgeport Sound Tigers	AHL	50	1	4	5	195	—	—	—	—	—
2013–14	New York Islanders	NHL	2	0	0	0	7	—	—	—	—	—
2014–15	Alaska Aces	ECHL	45	3	2	5	147	—	—	—	—	—
2015–16	Toronto Marlies	AHL	8	0	1	1	36	—	—	—	—	—
NHL totals			2	0	0	0	7	—	—	—	—	—
