= Rob Conn =

Canadian ice hockey player

- Born: September 3, 1968 (age 56); Calgary, Alberta, Canada
- Height: 6 ft 2 in (188 cm)
- Weight: 200 lb (91 kg; 14 st 4 lb)
- Position: Right wing
- Shot: Right
- Played for: Chicago Blackhawks; Buffalo Sabres
- NHL draft: Undrafted
- Playing career: 1991–1997

Robert Phillip Conn (born September 3, 1968) is a Canadian former professional ice hockey right wing. He played 30 games in the National Hockey League for the Chicago Blackhawks and Buffalo Sabres between 1992 and 1996. The rest of his career, which lasted from 1991 to 1997, was mainly spent in the minor leagues.

== Playing career ==
Conn was born in Calgary, Alberta. As a youth, he played in the 1981 Quebec International Pee-Wee Hockey Tournament with a minor ice hockey team from Calgary. He played in the National Hockey League with the Chicago Blackhawks and Buffalo Sabres. In his NHL career, Conn appeared in thirty games. He scored two goals and added five assists. In 1995, he won the Calder Cup with the Albany River Rats, and again 1996 with the Rochester Americans.

== Career statistics ==
=== Regular season and playoffs ===
			Regular season					Playoffs
Season	Team	League	GP	G	A	Pts	PIM	GP	G	A	Pts	PIM
1986–87	Calgary Canucks	AJHL	—	—	—	—	—	—	—	—	—	—
1987–88	Calgary Canucks	AJHL	—	—	—	—	—	—	—	—	—	—
1988–89	University of Alaska Anchorage	NCAA	33	21	17	38	46	—	—	—	—	—
1989–90	University of Alaska Anchorage	NCAA	34	27	21	48	46	—	—	—	—	—
1990–91	University of Alaska Anchorage	NCAA	43	28	32	60	53	—	—	—	—	—
1991–92	Chicago Blackhawks	NHL	2	0	0	0	2	—	—	—	—	—
1991–92	Indianapolis Ice	IHL	72	19	16	35	100	—	—	—	—	—
1992–93	Indianapolis Ice	IHL	75	13	14	27	81	5	0	1	1	6
1993–94	Indianapolis Ice	IHL	51	16	11	27	46	—	—	—	—	—
1994–95	Indianapolis Ice	IHL	10	4	4	8	11	—	—	—	—	—
1994–95	Albany River Rats	AHL	68	35	32	67	76	14	4	6	10	16
1995–96	Buffalo Sabres	NHL	28	2	5	7	18	—	—	—	—	—
1995–96	Rochester Americans	AHL	36	22	15	37	40	19	7	6	13	10
1996–97	Indianapolis Ice	IHL	72	25	32	57	81	4	0	0	0	8
IHL totals			280	77	77	154	319	9	0	1	1	14
NHL totals			30	2	5	7	20	—	—	—	—	—
