= Boston University Terriers ice hockey =

Boston University Terriers ice hockey may refer to either of the ice hockey teams that represent Boston University:

- Boston University Terriers men's ice hockey
- Boston University Terriers women's ice hockey
