= Mike Hiltner =

American ice hockey player (born 1966)

- Born: March 22, 1966 (age 59) Minneapolis, Minnesota, U.S.
- Height: 6 ft 1 in (185 cm)
- Weight: 195 lb (88 kg; 13 st 13 lb)
- Position: Right wing
- Shot: Left
- Played for: ERSC Amberg; Fort Wayne Komets; Ilves; Johnstown Chiefs; Kalamazoo Wings; Kansas City Blades; Nashville Knights; Raleigh IceCaps; SC Memmingen
- NHL draft: 1987 NHL Supplemental Draft; Quebec Nordiques
- Playing career: 1988–1993

Mike Hiltner (born March 22, 1966) is an American former professional ice hockey player.

== Career ==
Hiltner played four seasons at the University of Alaska Anchorage, where he was a point per game player, scoring 125 point in 121 games.

Hiltner made his professional debut in 1989, splitting time between the International Hockey League and the newly formed East Coast Hockey League.

Hiltner played the following season in the Finnish SM-liiga with Ilves, where he scored 33 points in 39 games. He returned to the IHL for the 1990–91 season, playing with the Kansas City Blades. Hiltner's totals dropped, where he scored eight goals and thirteen points in forty-four games.

Hiltner started the 1991-92 IHL season, but was later assigned to the Raleigh IceCaps and the Nashville Knights of the ECHL.

He would finish his career in 1993 in Germany, playing with SC Memmingen and later ERSC Amberg.

== Career statistics ==
| | | | Regular season | | | | | Playoffs |
| Season | Team | League | GP | G | A | Pts | PIM | GP | G | A | Pts | PIM |
|---|---|---|---|---|---|---|---|---|---|---|---|---|
| 1984–85 | University of Alaska Anchorage | NCAA | 30 | 8 | 9 | 17 | 58 | — | — | — | — | — |
| 1985–86 | University of Alaska Anchorage | NCAA | 26 | 8 | 12 | 20 | 50 | — | — | — | — | — |
| 1986–87 | University of Alaska Anchorage | NCAA | 30 | 19 | 20 | 39 | 76 | — | — | — | — | — |
| 1987–88 | University of Alaska Anchorage | NCAA | 35 | 28 | 21 | 49 | 123 | — | — | — | — | — |
| 1988–89 | Fort Wayne Komets | IHL | 2 | 0 | 0 | 0 | 0 | — | — | — | — | — |
| 1988–89 | Johnstown Chiefs | ECHL | 4 | 2 | 5 | 7 | 7 | — | — | — | — | — |
| 1988–89 | Kalamazoo Wings | IHL | 52 | 15 | 17 | 32 | 46 | 2 | 1 | 0 | 1 | 0 |
| 1989–90 | Ilves | SM-liiga | 38 | 18 | 15 | 33 | 38 | 9 | 6 | 4 | 10 | 10 |
| 1990–91 | Kansas City Blades | IHL | 44 | 8 | 5 | 13 | 34 | — | — | — | — | — |
| 1991–92 | Kansas City Blades | IHL | 2 | 0 | 2 | 2 | 2 | — | — | — | — | — |
| 1991–92 | Raleigh IceCaps | ECHL | 4 | 1 | 2 | 3 | 5 | — | — | — | — | — |
| 1991–92 | Nashville Knights | ECHL | 8 | 2 | 4 | 6 | 20 | — | — | — | — | — |
| 1992–93 | SC Memmingen | Germany2 | 7 | 3 | 4 | 7 | 2 | — | — | — | — | — |
| 1992–93 | ERSC Amberg | Germany4 | 3 | 4 | 0 | 4 | 2 | — | — | — | — | — |
| ECHL totals | | | 16 | 5 | 11 | 16 | 32 | — | — | — | — | — |
| IHL totals | | | 100 | 23 | 24 | 47 | 82 | 2 | 1 | 0 | 1 | 0 |
