= Iona Gaels men's ice hockey =

- University: Iona College (New York)
- Conference: MAAC
- Head coach: N/A
- Arena: New Roc Ice Skating Center; New Rochelle, New York
- Colors: Maroon and Gold

The Iona Gaels Men's Ice Hockey was an NCAA Division I ice hockey team that played in the MAAC for five seasons.

== History ==
Prior to the founding of the MAAC hockey conference the Gales had been a Division III ice hockey program and were a part of the ECAC 3 conference from 1977 thru 1998. When the MAAC formed their hockey conference as per NCAA regulations, the three full member schools in the conference were forced into the conference. Due to the reticence of the other MAAC schools to start hockey programs, Iona, Canisius and Fairfield were joined by five associate members for the first season in 1998–99. In the five-year existence of the MAAC hockey conference Iona was a middle of the pack team, finishing between third and eighth place and playing in every postseason tournament. Iona's best finish came in the 2000 season when they defeated the top-seeded Quinnipiac Braves en route to a second-place finish in the tournament. Despite showing some promise in their program, Iona's board of trustees voted to eliminate the men's ice hockey program at the end of the 2002-03 season.

Iona's ice hockey program began in 1967 under Harry Nixon. As a Division III independent, the Gaels went undefeated in their inaugural year with a 16-0 record. Though Nixon stepped down after only one year, Bill Edwards was able to shepherd Iona to eight winning seasons over the next decade, finishing 1976-77 with a 26-5-1 mark. After eleven years as an independent, Iona joined the ECAC 3. Edwards coached the first two seasons of the Gaels as a conference member before being succeeded by Frank Effinger in 11 season as coach, Iona experienced an unprecedented level of success, never finishing below a .600 record. Bill Conforte took over after the 1989-90 season and though the Gaels ended with a 16-6-1 record his first year, that would be the end of their success for the near future. Iona has a steady decline in the 1990s, routinely finishing with losing records and eventually the firing of Conforte after a 2-20-3 season in 1996-97. Frank Bretti was hired for the 1997-98 season and after a 4-20-1 finish, Iona was set to join the Division I ranks.

== Season-by-season records ==
Season	Division	Conference	Record	Pct.	Position	Conference Tournament	Coach
1967-68	College Division	Independent	16–0–0	1.000	—	—	Harry Nixon
1968-69	College Division	Independent	8–9–0	.471	—	—	Bill Edwards
1969-70	College Division	Independent	13–3–0	.812	—	—	Bill Edwards
1970-71	College Division	Independent	13–8–0	.619	—	—	Bill Edwards
1971-72	College Division	Independent	13–2–1	.844	—	—	Bill Edwards
1972-73	College Division	Independent	10–5–1	.656	—	—	Bill Edwards
1973-74	Division III	Independent	16–6–0	.727	—	—	Bill Edwards
1974-75	Division III	Independent	11–12–2	.480	—	—	Bill Edwards
1975-76	Division III	Independent	19–3–7	.776	—	—	Bill Edwards
1976-77	Division III	Independent	26–5–1	.828	—	—	Bill Edwards
1977-78	Division III	ECAC 3	12–5–2	.684	—	—	Bill Edwards
1978-79	Division III	ECAC 3	15–6–0	.714	—	—	Bill Edwards
1979-80	Division III	ECAC 3	14–5–0	.737	—	—	Frank Effinger
1980-81	Division III	ECAC 3	15–4–1	.775	—	Semifinals	Frank Effinger
1981-82	Division III	ECAC 3	13–5–1	.711	—	—	Frank Effinger
1982-83	Division III	ECAC 3	18–4–0	.818	—	Runner-Up	Frank Effinger
1983-84	Division III	ECAC 3	18–4–2	.792	—	—	Frank Effinger
1984-85	Division III	ECAC 3	21–7–0	.750	—	Semifinals	Frank Effinger
1985-86	Division III	ECAC North/South	17–9–0	.654	—	Quarterfinals	Frank Effinger
1986-87	Division III	ECAC North/South	15–8–0	.652	—	First Round	Frank Effinger
1987-88	Division III	ECAC North/South	16–9–1	.635	—	Quarterfinals	Frank Effinger
1988-89	Division III	ECAC North/South	20–7–0	.741	—	Runner-Up	Frank Effinger
1989-90	Division III	ECAC North/South	17–4–0	.810	—	Quarterfinals	Frank Effinger
1990-91	Division III	ECAC North/South	16–6–2	.708	—	Quarterfinals	Bill Conforte
1991-92	Division III	ECAC North/South	10–16–1	.389	—	First Round	Bill Conforte
1992-93	Division III	ECAC South	12–11–1	.521	—	Semifinals	Bill Conforte
1993-94	Division III	ECAC South	9–13–2	.417	3rd	None	Bill Conforte
1994-95	Division III	ECAC South	10–13–2	.440	6th	None	Bill Conforte
1995-96	Division III	ECAC South	9–15–1	.380	5th	None	Bill Conforte
1996-97	Division III	ECAC South	2–20–3	.140	7th	None	Bill Conforte
1997-98	Division III	ECAC South	4–20–1	.180	3rd	None	Frank Bretti
1998-99	Division I	MAAC	13–18–2	.424	6th	Quarterfinals	Frank Bretti
1999-00	Division I	MAAC	17–17–3	.500	6th	Runner-Up	Frank Bretti
2000-01	Division I	MAAC	18–13–4	.571	3rd	Semifinals	Frank Bretti
2001-02	Division I	MAAC	13–18–2	.424	7th	Quarterfinals	Frank Bretti
2002-03	Division I	MAAC	11–22–2	.343	8th	Quarterfinals	Frank Bretti
36 Seasons	—	—	500–332–45	.596	—	—	5 coaches

== All-time coaching records ==
=== Division I ===
Tenure	Coach	Years	Record	Pct.
1998–2003	Frank Bretti	5	72–88–13	.454
Totals	1 coach	5 seasons	72–88–13	.454

=== Division III ===
Tenure	Coach	Years	Record	Pct.
1967–1968	Harry Nixon	1	16–0–0	1.000
1968–1979	Bill Edwards	11	156–64–14	.697
1979–1990	Frank Effinger	11	184–66–5	.731
1990–1997	Bill Conforte	7	68–94–12	.425
1997–1998	Frank Bretti	1	4–20–1	.180
Totals	5 coaches	31 seasons	428–244–32	.631
