= John Hill (ice hockey) =

American ice hockey coach

Biographical details
- Born: November 26, 1960 (age 65); Hampton, Virginia, U.S.

Coaching career (HC unless noted)
- 1987–1989: Alaska-Anchorage (assistant)
- 1989–1991: Dubuque Fighting Saints
- 1993–1995: Alaska-Anchorage (assistant)
- 1995–1999: Colorado College (assistant)
- 1999–2001: Minnesota (assistant)
- 2001–2005: Alaska-Anchorage
- 2005–2011: Minnesota (assistant)

Head coaching record
- Overall: 39-89-15 (.325)

John Hill (born November 26, 1960) is an American former ice hockey coach. Through his career he worked mostly at the collegiate level for several schools over more than 20 years.

== Head coaching record ==
=== College ===
Record table
Season	Team	Overall	Conference	Standing	Postseason
Alaska–Anchorage Seawolves (WCHA) (2001–2005)
2001–02	Alaska–Anchorage	12-19-5	10-14-4	t-7th	WCHA First Round
2002–03	Alaska–Anchorage	1-28-7	0-22-6	10th	WCHA First Round
2003–04	Alaska–Anchorage	14-23-3	7-18-3	8th	WCHA Third Place Game (Loss)
2004–05	Alaska–Anchorage	12-19-6	8-16-4	7th	WCHA First Round
Alaska–Anchorage:		39-89-15	25-70-17		
Total:		39-89-15			
National champion Postseason invitational champion Conference regular season champion Conference regular season and conference tournament champion Division regular season champion Division regular season and conference tournament champion Conference tournament champion
