= Brush Christiansen =

Canadian retired ice hockey coach

Kelvin "Brush" Christiansen
Biographical details
- Born: c. 1945/1946; Fort Frances, ONT, CAN

Coaching career (HC unless noted)
- 1979–1996: Alaska-Anchorage

Head coaching record
- Overall: 287-229-30 (.553)

Accomplishments and honors

Championships
- 1987 Great West Regular Season Champion

Kelvin "Brush" Christiansen (born c. 1945/1946) is a Canadian retired ice hockey coach. He spent the entirety of his coaching career at Alaska-Anchorage after founding the program in 1979, retiring after 1995–96 season.

== Career ==
Brush Christiansen became a major figure at Alaska-Anchorage when he helped found the varsity ice hockey program in 1979. He took over as head coach and led the Seawolves through several good years as a Division II program, but the school's remote location led to an inability to find a conference to play in. When D-II ice hockey collapsed after the 1983–84 season, rather than drop down to Division III as most programs did, Alaska-Anchorage became a Division I Independent for a season before they were finally able to join a conference.

Along with three other western US schools, Alaska-Anchorage became a founding member of the Great West Hockey Conference in 1985. Despite their best efforts, however, two of the four schools had dropped their programs within three years and the conference was dissolved after the 1987–88 season. The experiment did, however, help bring Alaska-Anchorage some national attention and when they posted their first 20-win season as a D-I team two years later they were invited to participate in the 1990 NCAA Tournament. Christiansen's first foray in the tournament was predictably brief but the following season, finding his team invited once more, Brush's Seawolves shocked a great deal of onlookers by downing a strong Boston College team in two games to advance into the quarterfinals.

After another berth the next year Alaska-Anchorage was firmly established as a competitive D-I program and was invited to join the WCHA in 1993. Consistently facing much stiffer competition, the Seawolves' yearly records declined after joining the conference, but with their future much more secure Christiansen decided to step down in 1996 but he didn't entirely step away from the program, still keeping up with current events.

== Head coaching record ==
Statistics overview
| Season | Team | Overall | Conference | Standing | Postseason |
|---|---|---|---|---|---|
Alaska–Anchorage Seawolves (Independent (D–II)) (1979–1984)
| 1979–80 | Alaska–Anchorage | 8-0-0 | | | |
| 1980–81 | Alaska–Anchorage | 14-10-0 | | | |
| 1981–82 | Alaska–Anchorage | 15-12-0 | | | |
| 1982–83 | Alaska–Anchorage | 20-7-1 | | | |
| 1983–84 | Alaska–Anchorage | 23-6-1 | | | |
| Alaska–Anchorage: | | 80-35-2 | | | |
Alaska–Anchorage Seawolves (Independent (D–I)) (1984–1985)
| 1984–85 | Alaska–Anchorage | 17-21-0 | | | |
| Alaska–Anchorage: | | 17-21-0 | | | |
Alaska–Anchorage Seawolves (GWHC) (1985–1988)
| 1985–86 | Alaska–Anchorage | 12-20-1 | 3-8-1 | 4th | |
| 1986–87 | Alaska–Anchorage | 19-9-2 | 9-6-1 | 1st | |
| 1987–88 | Alaska–Anchorage | 18-15-3 | 3-5-0 | 3rd | |
| Alaska–Anchorage: | | 49-44-6 | 15-19-2 | | |
Alaska–Anchorage Seawolves Independent (1988–1993)
| 1988–89 | Alaska–Anchorage | 18-13-3 | | | |
| 1989–90 | Alaska–Anchorage | 21-11-2 | | | NCAA First Round |
| 1990–91 | Alaska–Anchorage | 22-17-4 | | | NCAA Quarterfinals |
| 1991–92 | Alaska–Anchorage | 27-8-1 | | | NCAA West Regional Quarterfinals |
| 1992–93 | Alaska–Anchorage | 18-13-5 | | | |
| Alaska–Anchorage: | | 106-62-15 | | | |
Alaska–Anchorage Seawolves (WCHA) (1993–1996)
| 1993–94 | Alaska–Anchorage | 15-19-2 | 14-16-2 | 6th | WCHA First Round |
| 1994–95 | Alaska–Anchorage | 11-25-0 | 10-22-0 | 10th | WCHA First Round |
| 1995–96 | Alaska–Anchorage | 9-23-5 | 8-20-5 | 9th | WCHA First Round |
| Alaska–Anchorage: | | 35-67-7 | 32-58-7 | | |
| Total: | | 287-229-30 | | | |
National champion Postseason invitational champion Conference regular season champion Conference regular season and conference tournament champion Division regular season champion Division regular season and conference tournament champion Conference tournament champion
