= Alaska Anchorage Seawolves men's ice hockey =

- Current season
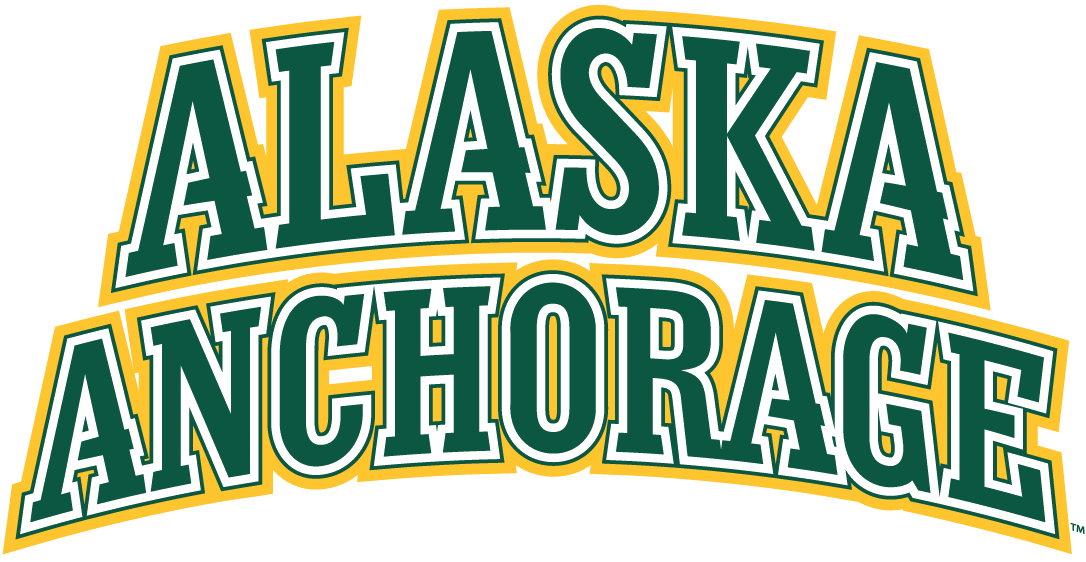
- University: University of Alaska Anchorage
- Conference: Independent
- First season: 1979–80
- Head coach: Matt Shasby; 5th season, 34–86–9 (.298)
- Assistant coaches: Trevor Stewart; Aaron McPheters; Chris Kamal; Vincent Pietrangelo
- Arena: Avis Alaska Sports Complex; Anchorage, Alaska
- Colors: Green and gold

NCAA tournament appearances
- 1990, 1991, 1992

Conference regular season champions
- GWHC: 1987

Current uniform

The Alaska Anchorage Seawolves men's ice hockey team is a National Collegiate Athletic Association (NCAA) Division I college ice hockey program that represents the University of Alaska Anchorage. The Seawolves were an original member of the now defunct men's division in the Western Collegiate Hockey Association (WCHA). They played at the Sullivan Arena in Anchorage, Alaska, and moved to the Seawolf Sports Complex on campus at the start of the 2019–20 season. The Seawolves have reached the NCAA Division I tournament three times but have not made it since 1992, the longest appearance drought for all NCAA Division I men's hockey teams.

== History ==
The Seawolves began their ice hockey program in 1979, playing 8 of its 31 games against Division II Alaska–Fairbanks, of which they won all of them, before beginning a full D-II schedule the following season. The Seawolves rose quickly in the Division II ranks, narrowly missing out on the NCAA tournament in 1984. The team was promoted to Division I that summer following the collapse of Division II hockey.

Anchorage played as an Independent for a year before being a founding member of the first West Coast conference, the Great West Hockey Conference. The league was very short-lived, lasting only three seasons before the two non-Alaska schools dropped hockey entirely, but it did provide UAA with its first league title in 1987. The Seawolves were once again without a conference.

A year later in 1990, they posted their first 20-win season at the D-I level and were selected to the NCAA Tournament, where they would be swept by Lake Superior State. They returned to the national tournament the following year after another 20-win campaign. This time they were able to win their first NCAA playoff game, sweeping Boston College, before being swept themselves by Northern Michigan. The 1991–92 season provided UAA with its best record in program history, with the team going 27–8–1 and garnering a third consecutive NCAA berth, a 3–7 loss to Lake Superior State. This would mark the Seawolves most recent NCAA playoff berth. After one more winning season, the Seawolves joined the Western Collegiate Hockey Association.

The stability of their new conference came as a double-edged sword, however, as the Seawolves would spend the next 20 years finishing with losing records. To make matters worse, the team frequently lost both games in the opening round of the WCHA tournament, losing their first 20 consecutive WCHA playoff games. The 2003–04 season proved to be a surprising one, as despite finishing 8th in the WCHA, the Seawolves made it all the way to the WCHA semifinals.

College hockey underwent a major re-alignment in 2013, when the CCHA collapsed due to the formation of the Big Ten, leading many WCHA members to leave and create the NCHC. This caused the WCHA to replace many of its departing members with former CCHA teams but even in the new, weaker WCHA, the Seawolves were still a bottom-half team. After finishing with a winning record and making the conference semifinals in the first season, the Seawolves would miss the playoffs each of the next five years.

Beginning in the 2019–20 season, the Seawolves began playing in the 800-person capacity on-campus Avis Alaska Sports Complex, rather than their old home of the Sullivan Arena. The university announced this move would save an approximate $200,000 per year. Further financial issues would crop up, as in 2020, the university announced plans to cut the hockey program, along with skiing and gymnastics, due to sharp reductions in state funding. The University of Alaska Board of Regents offered the hockey team a chance at reinstatement if they could raise two seasons worth of expenses, approximately $3 million by February 2021. The hockey program as a whole went on hiatus and did not compete for both the 2020–21 and 2021–22 seasons as its future was being determined. The fundraising was divided into 2 parts: $1.5 million in cash and the remainder in firm pledges. In December 2020, the team began fundraising for the needed money, and on August 31, 2021, the university announced that enough donations had been received to save the program.

The team returned to the ice in the 2022–23 season as an Independent program, following the collapse of the men's side of the WCHA after the CCHA's revival in 2021. Additionally, the Seawolves performed several upgrades on the small Avis Alaska Sports Complex to improve the fan and player experience. In 2023–24, the Seawolves posted their best season in a decade, with a 15–17–2 record. The team is currently pursuing plans to build a new arena.

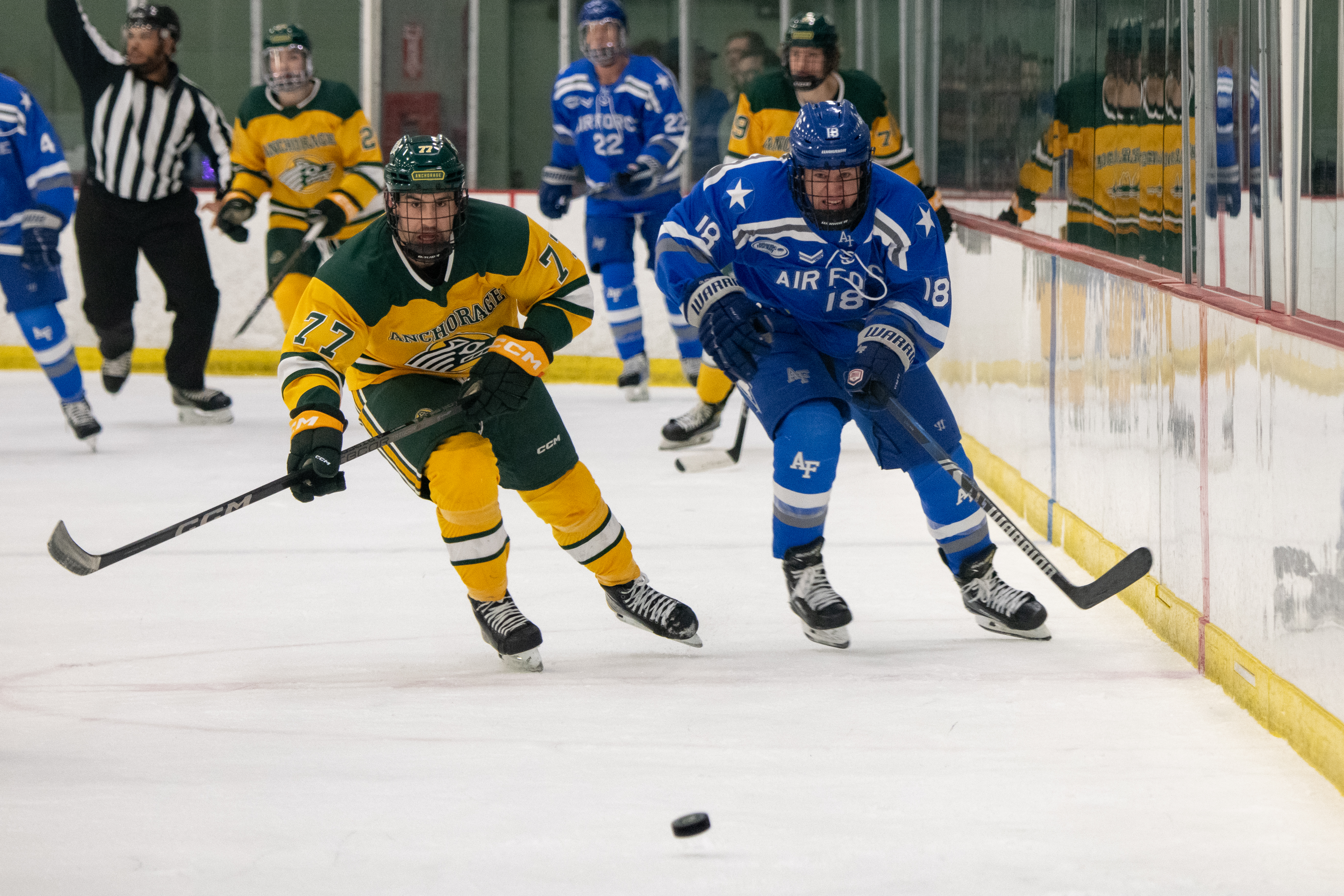
A Seawolves player (left) chases the puck during a 2023 game against Air Force at Avis Alaska Sports Complex

== Head coaches ==
As of completion of 2025–26 season. Records includes regular season and playoffs games.

| Tenure | Coach | Years | Record | Pct. |
|---|---|---|---|---|
| 1979–1996 | Brush Christiansen | 17 | 287–229–30 | .553 |
| 1996–2001 | Dean Talafous | 5 | 50–108–22 | .339 |
| 2001–2005 | John Hill | 4 | 39–89–21 | .332 |
| 2005–2013 | Dave Shyiak | 8 | 80–177–33 | .333 |
| 2013–2018 | Matt Thomas | 5 | 48–105–21 | .336 |
| 2018–2021 | Matt Curley | 2 | 7–53–10 | .171 |
| 2022–present | Matt Shasby | 4 | 34–86–9 | .298 |
| Totals | 7 coaches | 45 seasons | 545–847–146 | .402 |

== Statistical leaders ==
=== Career points leaders ===
| Player | Years | GP | G | A | Pts | PIM |
|---|---|---|---|---|---|---|
| Dean Larson | 1989–1992 | | 63 | 137 | 200 | |
| Dennis Sorenson | 1981–1984 | | 70 | 127 | 197 | |
| Joey Hayse | 1984–1987 | | 76 | 93 | 169 | |
| Derek Donald | 1989–1992 | | 74 | 91 | 165 | |
| Peter McEnaney | 1985–1988 | | 54 | 107 | 161 | |
| Doug Spooner | 1988–1991 | | 75 | 73 | 148 | |
| Steve Bogoyevac | 1989–1992 | | 50 | 96 | 146 | |
| Rob Conn | 1989–1991 | | 76 | 70 | 146 | |
| Keith Morris | 1990–1994 | | 73 | 61 | 134 | |
| Mark Stitt | 1992–1995 | | 45 | 88 | 133 | |

=== Career goaltending leaders ===
GP = Games played; Min = Minutes played; W = Wins; L = Losses; T = Ties; GA = Goals against; SO = Shutouts; SV% = Save percentage; GAA = Goals against average

Minimum 30 games

| Player | Years | GP | Min | W | L | T | GA | SO | SV% | GAA |
|---|---|---|---|---|---|---|---|---|---|---|
| Gregg Naumenko | 1998–1999 | 30 | 1692 | 11 | 13 | 5 | 65 | 1 | .920 | 2.31 |
| Olivier Mantha | 2014–2018 | 122 | 6973 | 28 | 77 | 14 | 350 | 3 | .908 | 3.01 |
| Jared Whale | 2022–2024 | 35 | 1752 | 11 | 18 | 1 | 88 | 2 | .906 | 3.01 |
| Chris Kamal | 2010–2014 | 71 | 3850 | 21 | 39 | 2 | 198 | 5 | .888 | 3.09 |
| Rob Gunderson | 2010–2014 | 82 | 4499 | 24 | 41 | 10 | 236 | 1 | .886 | 3.15 |

Statistics current through the end of the 2024-25 season.

== Roster ==
As of August 27, 2025.

| No. | Nat. | Player | Class | Pos | Height | Weight | DoB | Hometown | Previous team | NHL rights |
|---|---|---|---|---|---|---|---|---|---|---|
| 2 | (Canada) | Ethan Warrener | Sophomore | D | 6' 1" (1.85 m) | 175 lb (79 kg) | 2003-05-15 | Calgary, Alberta | Trail Smoke Eaters (BCHL) | — |
| 3 | (United States) | Joey Potter | Junior | D | 5' 11" (1.8 m) | 185 lb (84 kg) | 2003-05-09 | Pittsburgh, Pennsylvania | Union (ECAC) | — |
| 4 | (Canada) | Isaac Ménard | Freshman | D | 5' 10" (1.78 m) | 174 lb (79 kg) | 2004-04-08 | Trois-Rivières, Quebec | Shawinigan Cataractes (QMJHL) | — |
| 5 | (Slovakia) | Pavol Funtek | Sophomore | D | 6' 6" (1.98 m) | 207 lb (94 kg) | 2003-07-03 | Bratislava, Slovakia | Minot Minotauros (NAHL) | — |
| 6 | (United States) | Brandon Lajoie | Senior | F | 5' 11" (1.8 m) | 180 lb (82 kg) | 2001-10-18 | Eagle River, Alaska | St. Cloud Norsemen (NAHL) | — |
| 8 | (Canada) | Oren Shtrom | Freshman | F | 5' 10" (1.78 m) | 185 lb (84 kg) | 2004-09-28 | Dollard-des-Ormeaux, Quebec | Kamloops Blazers (WHL) | — |
| 9 | (Canada) | Conor Cole | Senior | F | 5' 10" (1.78 m) | 183 lb (83 kg) | 2001-10-28 | St. John's, Newfoundland and Labrador | Maryland Black Bears (NAHL) | — |
| 10 | (Canada) | Logan Acheson | Senior | D | 5' 11" (1.8 m) | 173 lb (78 kg) | 2002-04-24 | Edmonton, Alberta | Bemidji State (CCHA) | — |
| 11 | (United States) | Dylan Contreras | Sophomore | F | 5' 7" (1.7 m) | 165 lb (75 kg) | 2003-05-23 | Yorba Linda, California | Kenai River Brown Bears (NAHL) | — |
| 12 | (United States) | J. P. Steele | Sophomore | D | 6' 2" (1.88 m) | 185 lb (84 kg) | 2003-10-08 | Franklin, Michigan | Maine Nordiques (NAHL) | — |
| 13 | (Canada) | Luke Helgeson | Freshman | D | 6' 0" (1.83 m) | 205 lb (93 kg) | 2004-11-03 | Anchorage, Alaska | Colorado Grit (NAHL) | — |
| 14 | (United States) | Henry Bartle | Junior | F | 6' 2" (1.88 m) | 185 lb (84 kg) | 2003-06-03 | Blaine, Minnesota | Michigan Tech (CCHA) | — |
| 15 | (United States) | Dominic Foglia | Junior | D | 6' 1" (1.85 m) | 190 lb (86 kg) | 2002-04-09 | Tinton Falls, New Jersey | Colgate (ECAC) | — |
| 16 | (Canada) | Ryan Johnson | Sophomore | F | 5' 10" (1.78 m) | 181 lb (82 kg) | 2003-05-05 | Calgary, Alberta | New Mexico Ice Wolves (NAHL) | — |
| 17 | (United States) | Bryce Monrean | Sophomore | F | 5' 11" (1.8 m) | 165 lb (75 kg) | 2003-05-28 | Anchorage, Alaska | Alaska (NCAA) | — |
| 18 | (Canada) | Judah Makway | Freshman | F | 6' 3" (1.91 m) | 190 lb (86 kg) | 2004-09-28 | Trail, British Columbia | Trail Smoke Eaters (BCHL) | — |
| 19 | (Canada) | Nolan Gagnon | Sophomore | D | 5' 10" (1.78 m) | 165 lb (75 kg) | 2003-04-18 | Metcalfe, Ontario | Amarillo Wranglers (NAHL) | — |
| 20 | (Canada) | Adam Parsons | Sophomore | F | 6' 0" (1.83 m) | 170 lb (77 kg) | 2003-10-22 | Port Moody, British Columbia | Trail Smoke Eaters (BCHL) | — |
| 21 | (United States) | Ben Anderson | Junior | F | 6' 5" (1.96 m) | 210 lb (95 kg) | 2002-03-01 | Crystal, Minnesota | Wisconsin Windigo (NAHL) | — |
| 22 | (United States) | Aiden Westin | Junior | F | 6' 1" (1.85 m) | 185 lb (84 kg) | 2002-02-06 | Anchorage, Alaska | Anchorage Wolverines (NAHL) | — |
| 25 | (Canada) | David Jesus | Junior | D | 6' 4" (1.93 m) | 187 lb (85 kg) | 2002-05-30 | Toronto, Ontario | Windsor (OUA) | — |
| 27 | (United States) | Dimitry Kebreau | Sophomore | F | 5' 10" (1.78 m) | 181 lb (82 kg) | 2003-06-16 | Silver Spring, Maryland | Maryland Black Bears (NAHL) | — |
| 28 | (United States) | Tanyon Bajzer | Junior | F | 6' 1" (1.85 m) | 180 lb (82 kg) | 2002-08-25 | Shaker Heights, Ohio | Miami (NCHC) | — |
| 29 | (Canada) | Tye Spencer | Freshman | F | 5' 8" (1.73 m) | 150 lb (68 kg) | 2004-06-27 | Saskatoon, Saskatchewan | Wenatchee Wild (WHL) | — |
| 30 | (United States) | Tyler Krivtsov | Sophomore | G | 6' 2" (1.88 m) | 190 lb (86 kg) | 2003-12-02 | Santa Clarita, California | Fairbanks Ice Dogs (AJHL) | — |
| 31 | (United States) | Bryant Marks | Sophomore | G | 6' 0" (1.83 m) | 174 lb (79 kg) | 2004-03-12 | Wasilla, Alaska | Kenai River Brown Bears (NAHL) | — |
| 33 | (Hungary) | Greg Orosz | Junior | G | 6' 3" (1.91 m) | 190 lb (86 kg) | 2002-08-28 | Győr, Hungary | Odessa Jackalopes (NAHL) | — |
| 37 | (United States) | Luke Johnson | Senior | F | 5' 9" (1.75 m) | 165 lb (75 kg) | 2001-10-15 | St. Cloud, Minnesota | Alaska (NCAA) | — |
| 43 | (Canada) | Karter McNarland | Sophomore | F | 5' 11" (1.8 m) | 170 lb (77 kg) | 2003-02-10 | Saskatoon, Saskatchewan | Powell River Kings (BCHL) | — |

== Olympians ==
This is a list of Alaska Anchorage alumni were a part of an Olympic team.

| Name | Position | Alaska Anchorage Tenure | Team | Year | Finish |
|---|---|---|---|---|---|
| Mat Robinson | Defenseman | 2005–2009 | (Canada) CAN | 2018, 2022 | Bronze, 6th |

== Seawolves in the NHL ==
As of July 1, 2025.

| Player | Position | Team(s) | Years | Games | Stanley Cups |
|---|---|---|---|---|---|
| Jeff Batters | Defense | STL | 1993–1994 | 16 | 0 |
| Jay Beagle | Center | WSH, VAN, ARI | 2008–2022 | 646 | 1 |
| Rob Conn | Right wing | CHI, BUF | 1991–1996 | 30 | 0 |
| Curtis Glencross | Left wing | ANA, CBJ, EDM, CGY, WSH | 2006–2015 | 507 | 0 |
| Justin Johnson | Right wing | NYI | 2013–2014 | 2 | 0 |
| Nathan Lawson | Goaltender | NYI, OTT | 2010–2014 | 11 | 0 |
| Gregg Naumenko | Goaltender | ANA | 2000–2001 | 2 | 0 |
| Mike Peluso | Left wing | CHI, OTT, NJD, STL, CGY | 1989–1998 | 458 | 1 |
| Duvie Westcott | Defense | CBJ | 2001–2008 | 201 | 0 |

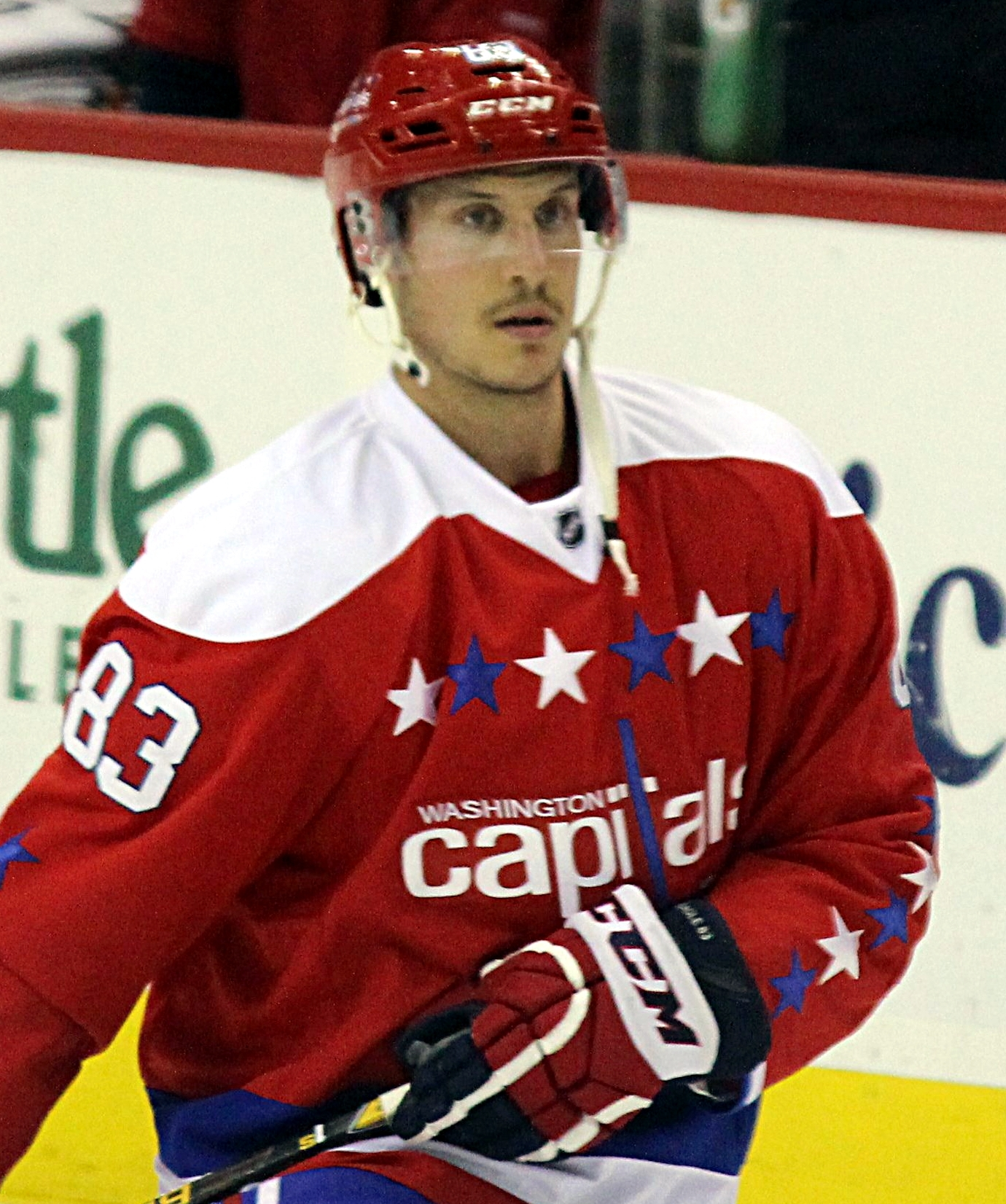
Jay Beagle

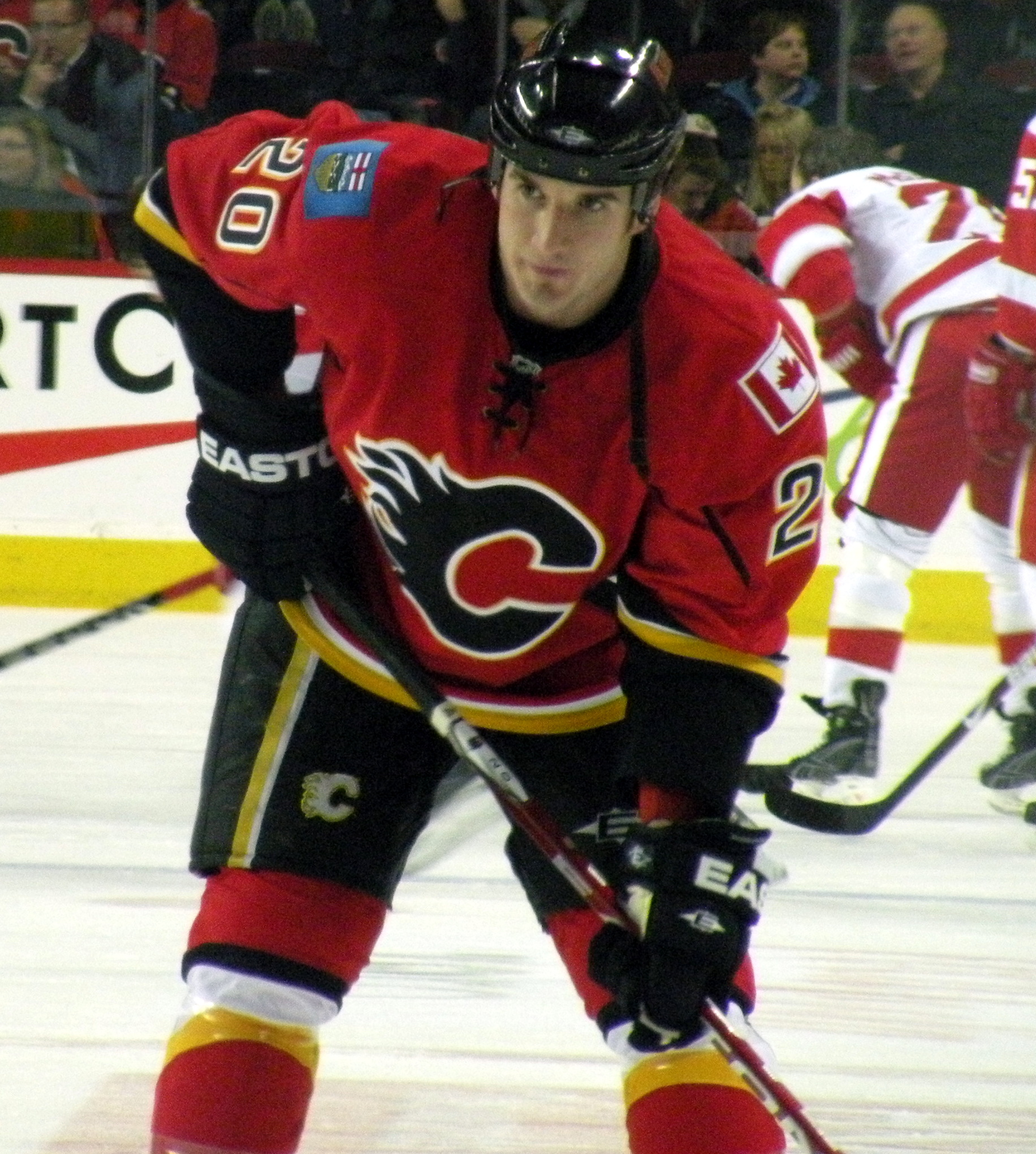
Curtis Glencross

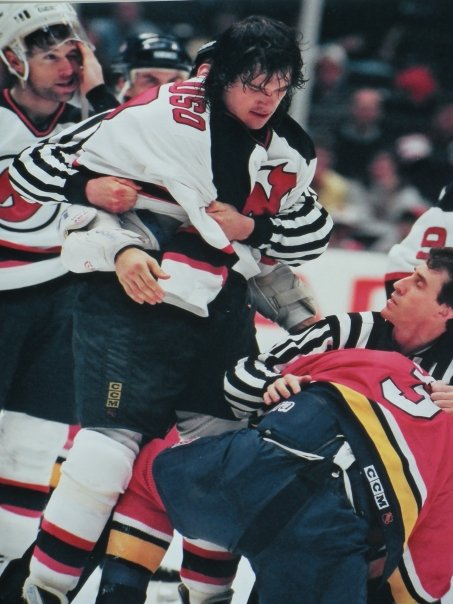
Mike Peluso
