= 2024–25 Colorado College Tigers men's ice hockey season =

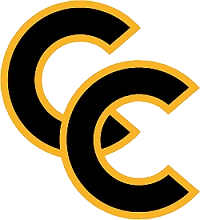
- Conference: 6th NCHC
- Home ice: Ed Robson Arena

Rankings
- USCHO: NR
- USA Hockey: NR

Record
- Overall: 18–18–1
- Conference: 11–12–1
- Home: 11–6–0
- Road: 7–12–1

Coaches and captains
- Head coach: Kris Mayotte
- Assistant coaches: Peter Mannino; John Lidgett; Andrew Oglevie
- Captain: Stanley Cooley
- Alternate captain(s): Noah Laba; Ethan Straky

The 2024–25 Colorado College Tigers men's ice hockey season was the 85th season of play for the program and the 12th in the NCHC. The Tigers represented Colorado College in the 2024–25 NCAA Division I men's ice hockey season, played their home games at the Ed Robson Arena and were coached by Kris Mayotte, in his 4th season.

== Season ==
With Colorado College having improved for three consecutive seasons under Kris Mayotte, the Tigers were picked by many to make the NCAA tournament. Early on, the team looked to be on track to meet those prediction when they won their first eight games of the campaign. Kaidan Mbereko, the Tigers' starting netminder, looked every bit the All-American he had been in 2024. The offense was consistently finding the back of the net despite losing last year's leading scorer, Noah Laba, to a leg injury for a brief time.

CC was riding high, and they rose up to #8 in the national polls, however, their ranking was being held back by the weakness of their opponents. In mid-November, the Tigers would be able to remedy that situation when they went through a gauntlet of ranked teams. Unfortunately, Colorado College was not able to make it through unscathed. In the final four weeks before the winter break, CC won only two of their eight games and began to come back down to earth. Unlike the early part of the season, Mbereko found it difficult to keep the puck out of the net while the Tigers' offense struggled to score. Even with a 2-week layoff, the team's problems persisted and CC's run of poor performances continued throughout January. By the beginning of February, the team that had begun the season unblemished in eight games was now a .500 squad.

As the losses piled up, Colorado College tumbled down the rankings and eventually fell out of the polls entirely, though only for a short while. The scoring did pick up a bit by the end of January and enabled the team to earn splits with ranked clubs for three consecutive weeks, however, the inconsistency of the forwards did not repair the Tiger's dashed playoff hopes. By playing even hockey over the final seven weeks of the season, CC had no shot at a tournament appearance without winning the conference championship.

When their postseason began, CC did not have far to travel as they faced their long-time nemesis Denver in the quarterfinals. Mbereko weathered a barrage of chances from the Pioneers in the first two periods and, though the team was down entering the third, they were only a single shot away from tying the game. Ty Gallagher made good on a glorious 5-on-3 power play early in the period to even the count. With less than 4 minutes to play, Brady Cleveland netted his first of the year and the team held on to win the first match of the series. Unfortunately for CC, the team got into penalty trouble in the rematch and surrendered 3 man-advantage goals to Denver to even the series. The final game was even worse for the Tigers as not only did the Pios score 3 more on the power play but CC also gave up a short-handed tally as well as another goal on a delayed penalty. The abysmal special teams play by Colorado College ended any chance the Tigers had at extending their season, bringing a very disappointing year to a close.

== Departures ==
Player	Position	Nationality	Cause
Nicklas Andrews	Defenseman	United States	Graduate transfer to Michigan State
Jake Begley	Goaltender	United States	Graduation (retired)
Nikolai Charchenko	Defenseman	United States	Transferred to MSOE
Ray Christy	Forward	United States	Graduate transfer to St. Thomas
Antonio Fernandez	Defenseman	United States	Transferred to Colgate
Chase Foley	Defenseman	United States	Graduate transfer to St. Thomas
Connor Mayer	Defenseman	United States	Graduation (signed with Utah Grizzlies)
Jack Millar	Defenseman	United States	Graduation (signed with Ontario Reign)
Noah Serdachny	Forward	Canada	Transferred to American International
Evan Werner	Forward	United States	Transferred to Michigan
Logan Will	Forward	United States	Graduate transfer to Providence

== Recruiting ==
Player	Position	Nationality	Age	Notes
Nick Baer	Defenseman	United States	20	Minnetonka, MN
Owen Beckner	Forward	Canada	19	Victoria, BC; selected 204th overall in 2023
Philippe Blais-Savoie	Defenseman	United States	19	San Jose, CA
Jordan Brisson	Forward	United States	20	Manhattan Beach, CA
Brady Cleveland	Defenseman	United States	19	Wausau, WI; transfer from Wisconsin; selected 47th overall in 2023
Ty Gallagher	Defenseman	United States	21	Clarkston, MI; transfer from Boston University; selected 217th overall in 2021
Ryan Koering	Defenseman	United States	19	Eden Prairie, MN
Gavin Lindberg	Forward	United States	20	Fergus Falls, MN
Chase McLane	Forward	United States	24	Trenton, MI; graduate transfer from Penn State; selected 209th overall in 2020
Carsen Musser	Goaltender	United States	19	Fairmont, MN; selected 166th overall in 2023
Fisher Scott	Defenseman	United States	19	Carbondale, CO; selected 208th overall in 2024
Charlie Strobel	Forward	United States	23	Stillwater, MN; transfer from Minnesota

== Roster ==
As of August 9, 2024.

No.	Nat.	Player	Class	Pos	Height	Weight	DoB	Hometown	Previous team	NHL rights
2	(Canada)	Zaccharya Wisdom	Sophomore	F	6' 0" (1.83 m)	175 lb (79 kg)	2004-04-21	Toronto, Ontario	Cedar Rapids RoughRiders (USHL)	SEA, 212th overall 2023
4	(United States)	Max Burkholder	Sophomore	D	5' 9" (1.75 m)	176 lb (80 kg)	2003-08-08	Chaska, Minnesota	Dubuque Fighting Saints (USHL)	—
5	(United States)	Ryan Koering	Freshman	D	6' 3" (1.91 m)	187 lb (85 kg)	2005-02-11	Eden Prairie, Minnesota	Muskegon Lumberjacks (USHL)	—
6	(United States)	Ty Gallagher	Graduate	D	6' 0" (1.83 m)	190 lb (86 kg)	2003-03-06	Clarkston, Michigan	Boston University (HEA)	BOS, 217th overall 2021
7	(United States)	Philippe Blais-Savoie	Freshman	D	6' 0" (1.83 m)	185 lb (84 kg)	2005-06-10	San Jose, California	Tri-City Storm (USHL)	—
8	(United States)	Ryan Beck	Junior	F	5' 9" (1.75 m)	195 lb (88 kg)	2002-08-25	Linden, Michigan	Dubuque Fighting Saints (USHL)	—
9	(Canada)	Owen Beckner	Freshman	F	6' 2" (1.88 m)	181 lb (82 kg)	2005-02-27	Victoria, British Columbia	Tri-City Storm (USHL)	OTT, 204th overall 2023
10	(United States)	Bret Link	Sophomore	F	6' 3" (1.91 m)	188 lb (85 kg)	2002-04-09	Anchorage, Alaska	Fargo Force (USHL)	—
11	(United States)	Chase McLane	Graduate	F	6' 2" (1.88 m)	183 lb (83 kg)	2000-04-22	Trenton, Michigan	Penn State (Big Ten)	NSH, 209th overall 2020
12	(United States)	Tommy Middleton	Senior	F	5' 11" (1.8 m)	185 lb (84 kg)	2000-06-19	Midland, Michigan	Janesville Jets (NAHL)	—
14	(United States)	Brady Cleveland	Sophomore	D	6' 5" (1.96 m)	211 lb (96 kg)	2005-04-01	Wausau, Wisconsin	Wisconsin (Big Ten)	DET, 47th overall 2023
15	(United States)	Nick Baer	Freshman	D	6' 0" (1.83 m)	181 lb (82 kg)	2004-03-14	Minnetonka, Minnesota	Bismarck Bobcats (NAHL)	—
17	(United States)	Tyler Coffey	Graduate	F	5' 10" (1.78 m)	180 lb (82 kg)	2000-05-19	Hamilton, New Jersey	Sioux Falls Stampede (USHL)	—
18	(United States)	Fisher Scott	Freshman	D	6' 2" (1.88 m)	179 lb (81 kg)	2004-10-27	Carbondale, Colorado	Dubuque Fighting Saints (USHL)	DET, 208th overall 2024
19	(United States)	Charlie Strobel	Junior	F	6' 1" (1.85 m)	200 lb (91 kg)	2001-07-09	Stillwater, Minnesota	Minnesota (Big Ten)	—
20	(United States)	Gavin Lindberg	Freshman	F	6' 0" (1.83 m)	192 lb (87 kg)	2004-04-20	Fergus Falls, Minnesota	Waterloo Black Hawks (USHL)	—
21	(United States)	Tyler Dunbar	Sophomore	D	6' 1" (1.85 m)	197 lb (89 kg)	2003-12-18	Sault Ste. Marie, Michigan	Lincoln Stars (USHL)	—
22	(United States)	Jordan Brisson	Freshman	F	6' 1" (1.85 m)	185 lb (84 kg)	2003-12-01	Manhattan Beach, California	Chicago Steel (USHL)	—
23	(United States)	Ethan Straky (A)	Junior	F	5' 11" (1.8 m)	181 lb (82 kg)	2003-04-18	Walnut Creek, California	Green Bay Gamblers (USHL)	—
24	(Latvia)	Klāvs Veinbergs	Sophomore	F	6' 3" (1.91 m)	198 lb (90 kg)	2003-03-27	Riga, Latvia	Lincoln Stars (USHL)	TBL, 224th overall 2022
25	(United States)	Riley Stuart	Sophomore	F	6' 2" (1.88 m)	201 lb (91 kg)	2002-01-17	Phoenix, Arizona	Dubuque Fighting Saints (USHL)	—
26	(United States)	Noah Laba (A)	Junior	F	6' 2" (1.88 m)	192 lb (87 kg)	2003-08-04	Northville, Michigan	Lincoln Stars (USHL)	NYR, 111th overall 2022
27	(Canada)	Stanley Cooley (C)	Senior	F	5' 11" (1.8 m)	188 lb (85 kg)	2002-05-27	Regina, Saskatchewan	Lincoln Stars (USHL)	—
28	(United States)	Gleb Veremyev	Junior	F	6' 4" (1.93 m)	206 lb (93 kg)	2003-06-28	Sayreville, New Jersey	Lincoln Stars (USHL)	—
29	(United States)	Drew Montgomery	Sophomore	F	5' 11" (1.8 m)	174 lb (79 kg)	2003-03-27	Grand Forks, North Dakota	Omaha Lancers (USHL)	—
30	(United States)	Kaidan Mbereko	Junior	G	5' 11" (1.8 m)	185 lb (84 kg)	2003-07-28	Aspen, Colorado	Lincoln Stars (USHL)	—
31	(United States)	Henry Wilder	Senior	G	6' 0" (1.83 m)	180 lb (82 kg)	2001-03-19	Needham, Massachusetts	Boston College (HEA)	—
37	(United States)	Carsen Musser	Freshman	G	6' 4" (1.93 m)	220 lb (100 kg)	2005-05-19	Fairmont, Minnesota	Madison Capitols (USHL)	UTA, 166th overall 2023

== Standings ==
2024–25 National Collegiate Hockey Conference Standings
	Conference record										Overall record					
	GP	W	L	T	OTW	OTL	SW	PTS	GF	GA	GP	W	L	T	GF	GA
#1 Western Michigan †*	24	19	4	1	4	3	0	57	98	51	42	34	7	1	167	86
#16 Arizona State	24	14	9	1	2	5	1	47	91	69	37	21	14	2	136	103
#3 Denver	24	15	8	1	2	1	0	45	89	59	44	31	12	1	174	94
Omaha	24	14	9	1	1	1	1	44	82	69	36	18	17	1	105	99
#18 North Dakota	24	14	9	1	3	1	1	42	81	73	38	21	15	2	120	111
Colorado College	24	11	12	1	4	1	1	32	68	72	37	18	18	1	106	113
Minnesota Duluth	24	9	13	2	2	2	1	30	63	77	36	13	20	3	99	117
St. Cloud State	24	7	16	1	2	3	0	23	53	79	36	14	21	1	79	110
Miami	24	0	23	1	0	3	0	4	38	114	34	3	28	3	63	143
Championship: March 22, 2025 † indicates conference regular season champion (Penrose Cup) * indicates conference tournament champion (Frozen Faceoff Championship Trophy); Rankings: USCHO.com Top 20 Poll

== Schedule and results ==
Date	Time	Opponent^{#}	Rank^{#}	Site	TV	Decision	Result	Attendance	Record
Exhibition
October 5	6:00 pm	Briercrest*	#11	Ed Robson Arena • Colorado Springs, Colorado (Exhibition)		Mbereko	W 8–0		
Regular Season
October 11	7:00 pm	Northern Michigan*	#12	Ed Robson Arena • Colorado Springs, Colorado	SOCO CW	Mbereko	W 4–3 ^{OT}	3,650	1–0–0
October 12	6:00 pm	Northern Michigan*	#12	Ed Robson Arena • Colorado Springs, Colorado	SOCO CW	Mbereko	W 6–1	3,650	2–0–0
October 25	9:07 pm	at Alaska Anchorage*	#9	Avis Alaska Sports Complex • Anchorage, Alaska		Mbereko	W 2–1	601	3–0–0
October 26	9:07 pm	at Alaska Anchorage*	#9	Avis Alaska Sports Complex • Anchorage, Alaska		Mbereko	W 2–0	577	4–0–0
November 1	7:00 pm	Air Force*	#8	Ed Robson Arena • Colorado Springs, Colorado (Rivalry)	SOCO CW	Mbereko	W 3–2 ^{OT}	3,859	5–0–0
November 2	7:00 pm	at Air Force*	#8	Cadet Ice Arena • Colorado Springs, Colorado (Rivalry)	FloHockey	Mbereko	W 6–1	2,250	6–0–0
November 8	7:00 pm	Arizona State	#8	Ed Robson Arena • Colorado Springs, Colorado	SOCO CW	Mbereko	W 4–3 ^{OT}	3,650	7–0–0 (1–0–0)
November 9	6:00 pm	Arizona State	#8	Ed Robson Arena • Colorado Springs, Colorado		Mbereko	W 3–1	3,710	8–0–0 (2–0–0)
November 15	7:00 pm	at #13 Western Michigan	#8	Lawson Arena • Kalamazoo, Michigan		Mbereko	L 2–3 ^{OT}	3,437	8–1–0 (2–1–0)
November 16	6:00 pm	at #13 Western Michigan	#8	Lawson Arena • Kalamazoo, Michigan		Mbereko	T 1–1 ^{SOW}	3,966	8–1–1 (2–1–1)
November 22	7:00 pm	#11 St. Cloud State	#7	Ed Robson Arena • Colorado Springs, Colorado	SOCO CW	Mbereko	L 2–3	3,858	8–2–1 (2–2–1)
November 23	6:00 pm	#11 St. Cloud State	#7	Ed Robson Arena • Colorado Springs, Colorado		Mbereko	W 1–0	3,821	9–2–1 (3–2–1)
December 6	5:00 pm	at #10 Providence*	#8	Schneider Arena • Providence, Rhode Island	ESPN+	Mbereko	L 3–4	2,641	9–3–1
December 7	4:00 pm	at #10 Providence*	#8	Schneider Arena • Providence, Rhode Island	ESPN+	Mbereko	L 1–5	2,418	9–4–1
December 13	7:00 pm	#4 Denver	#10т	Ed Robson Arena • Colorado Springs, Colorado (Rivalry)	SOCO CW	Mbereko	W 5–4	3,952	10–4–1 (4–2–1)
December 14	7:00 pm	at #4 Denver	#10т	Magness Arena • Denver, Colorado (Rivalry)	Altitude 2	Mbereko	L 1–2	6,606	10–5–1 (4–3–1)
December 29	3:00 pm	UNLV*	#8	Ed Robson Arena • Colorado Springs, Colorado (Exhibition)		Mbereko	W 8–0	3,420	
January 3	7:00 pm	Augustana*	#8	Ed Robson Arena • Colorado Springs, Colorado		Mbereko	L 1–5	3,417	10–6–1
January 4	4:00 pm	Augustana*	#8	Ed Robson Arena • Colorado Springs, Colorado		Musser	L 2–3	3,493	10–7–1
January 10	6:00 pm	at Omaha	#13	Baxter Arena • Omaha, Nebraska		Mbereko	L 2–5	6,475	10–8–1 (4–4–1)
January 11	6:00 pm	at Omaha	#13	Baxter Arena • Omaha, Nebraska		Mbereko	L 1–3	6,955	10–9–1 (4–5–1)
January 17	7:00 pm	Minnesota Duluth	#18	Ed Robson Arena • Colorado Springs, Colorado	CBSSN	Mbereko	W 7–2	3,492	11–9–1 (5–5–1)
January 18	6:00 pm	Minnesota Duluth	#18	Ed Robson Arena • Colorado Springs, Colorado		Mbereko	L 1–4	3,525	11–10–1 (5–6–1)
January 24	7:00 pm	at #11 Arizona State	#19	Mullett Arena • Tempe, Arizona		Mbereko	L 1–4	5,150	11–11–1 (5–7–1)
January 25	5:00 pm	at #11 Arizona State	#19	Mullett Arena • Tempe, Arizona	Fox 10 Xtra	Musser	W 5–4	5,160	12–11–1 (6–7–1)
January 31	7:00 pm	#3 Western Michigan		Ed Robson Arena • Colorado Springs, Colorado	CBSSN	Mbereko	L 1–4	3,541	12–12–1 (6–8–1)
February 1	6:00 pm	#3 Western Michigan		Ed Robson Arena • Colorado Springs, Colorado		Musser	W 3–2	3,550	13–12–1 (7–8–1)
February 7	6:00 pm	at #16 North Dakota	#20	Ralph Engelstad Arena • Grand Forks, North Dakota	Midco Sports	Mbereko	W 6–4	11,572	14–12–1 (8–8–1)
February 8	6:00 pm	at #16 North Dakota	#20	Ralph Engelstad Arena • Grand Forks, North Dakota	Midco Sports	Musser	L 1–3	11,640	14–13–1 (8–9–1)
February 14	7:00 pm	Miami	#19	Ed Robson Arena • Colorado Springs, Colorado		Mbereko	W 6–1	3,446	15–13–1 (9–9–1)
February 15	6:00 pm	Miami	#19	Ed Robson Arena • Colorado Springs, Colorado		Musser	W 5–4 ^{OT}	3,630	16–13–1 (10–9–1)
February 21	7:30 pm	at St. Cloud State	#20	Herb Brooks National Hockey Center • St. Cloud, Minnesota	Fox 9+	Mbereko	W 4–3	3,225	17–13–1 (11–9–1)
February 22	6:00 pm	at St. Cloud State	#20	Herb Brooks National Hockey Center • St. Cloud, Minnesota	Fox 9+	Mbereko	L 2–4	3,567	17–14–1 (11–10–1)
March 7	7:00 pm	at #7 Denver	#20т	Magness Arena • Denver, Colorado (Rivalry)	Altitude	Mbereko	L 1–4	7,023	17–15–1 (11–11–1)
March 8	6:00 pm	#7 Denver	#20т	Ed Robson Arena • Colorado Springs, Colorado (Rivalry)		Mbereko	L 3–4	3,532	17–16–1 (11–12–1)
NCHC Tournament
March 14	7:00 pm	at #6 Denver*		Magness Arena • Denver, Colorado (NCHC Quarterfinal Game 1; Rivalry)		Mbereko	W 3–1	6,708	18–16–1
March 15	6:00 pm	at #6 Denver*		Magness Arena • Denver, Colorado (NCHC Quarterfinal Game 2; Rivalry)		Mbereko	L 3–6	6,743	18–17–1
March 16	6:00 pm	at #6 Denver*		Magness Arena • Denver, Colorado (NCHC Quarterfinal Game 3; Rivalry)		Musser	L 2–9	5,063	18–18–1
*Non-conference game. ^{#}Rankings from USCHO.com Poll. All times are in Mountain Time. Source:

== Scoring statistics ==
Name	Position	Games	Goals	Assists	Points	PIM
Owen Beckner	C	37	7	20	27	4
Noah Laba	C	29	10	16	26	25
Ty Gallagher	RW	37	9	17	26	12
Max Burkholder	D	37	6	20	26	12
Zaccharya Wisdom	RW	36	8	13	21	12
Bret Link	RW	37	7	14	21	24
Klāvs Veinbergs	C/LW	36	9	10	19	32
Drew Montgomery	F	34	10	8	18	18
Gleb Veremyev	C	37	9	8	17	50
Philippe Blais-Savoie	D	30	4	11	15	10
Stan Cooley	C	37	6	6	12	28
Chase McLane	C/RW	33	5	5	10	26
Gavin Lindberg	F	37	5	5	10	8
Fisher Scott	D	34	3	7	10	12
Ryan Beck	C	27	0	7	7	8
Tyler Coffey	F	23	4	2	6	0
Ethan Straky	D	32	0	6	6	24
Tommy Middleton	F	21	1	4	5	8
Ryan Koering	D	30	1	2	3	2
Brady Cleveland	D	37	1	2	3	39
Riley Stuart	F	21	1	0	1	36
Charlie Strobel	C	6	0	1	1	6
Tyler Dunbar	D	14	0	1	1	21
Jordan Brisson	F	1	0	0	0	0
Henry Wilder	G	2	0	0	0	0
Carsen Musser	G	9	0	0	0	0
Kaidan Mbereko	G	31	0	0	0	0
Bench	–	–	–	–	–	18
Total			106	185	291	435

== Goaltending statistics ==
Name	Games	Minutes	Wins	Losses	Ties	Goals against	Saves	Shut outs	SV %	GAA
Henry Wilder	4	10:10	0	0	0	0	5	0	1.000	0.00
Kaidan Mbereko	31	1810:32	15	15	1	80	758	2	.905	2.65
Carsen Musser	11	396:08	3	3	0	26	188	0	.879	3.94
Empty Net	-	23:51	-	-	-	7	-	-	-	-
Total	37	2240:41	18	18	1	113	951	2	.894	3.03

== Rankings ==
Poll	Week																											
Poll	Pre	1	2	3	4	5	6	7	8	9	10	11	12	13	14	15	16	17	18	19	20	21	22	23	24	25	26	27 (Final)
USCHO.com	11	12	11	9	8	8	8	7	8	8	10т	8	–	8	13	18	19	RV	20	19	20	20	20т	RV	RV	NR	–	NR
USA Hockey	12	12	11	9	9	8	8	8	8	8	11	11	–	8	14	19	19	RV	RV	RV	RV	RV	RV	NR	RV	NR	NR	NR

Note: USCHO did not release a poll in week 12 or 26.
Note: USA Hockey did not release a poll in week 12.

== Awards and honors ==
Player	Award	Ref
Max Burkholder	All-NCHC Second Team	

== Players drafted into the NHL ==
Round	Pick	Player	NHL team
5	143	Wilson Bjorck ^{†}	Vancouver Canucks

† incoming freshman
