= 2025 NCHC Tournament =

2025 NCHC Men's ice hockey tournament
- Dates: March 14–22, 2025
- Teams: 8
- Finals site: Xcel Energy Center; Saint Paul, Minnesota
- Champions: Western Michigan (1st title)
- Winning coach: Pat Ferschweiler (1st title)
- MVP: Alex Bump (Western Michigan)
- NCHC Men's Ice Hockey Tournaments

The 2025 NCHC Tournament was the 11th tournament in league history. It was played between March 14 and 22, 2025. Quarterfinal games were played at home team campus sites, while the semifinal and championship matches were held at the Xcel Energy Center in Saint Paul, Minnesota. As the tournament winner, Western Michigan, earned the NCHC's automatic bid to the 2025 NCAA Division I men's ice hockey tournament.

== Format ==
The first round of the postseason tournament features a best-of-three games format. The top eight conference teams participated in the tournament. Teams were seeded No. 1 through No. 8 according to their final conference standing, with a tiebreaker system used to seed teams with an identical number of points accumulated. The top four seeded teams each earn home ice and host one of the lower seeded teams.

The winners of the first round series advanced to the Xcel Energy Center for the NCHC Frozen Faceoff. The Frozen Faceoff uses a single-elimination format. Teams were re-seeded No. 1 through No. 4 according to the final regular season conference standings.

=== Standings ===
2024–25 National Collegiate Hockey Conference Standings
| | Conference record | | | | | | | | | | Overall record | | | | | |
| | GP | W | L | T | OTW | OTL | SW | PTS | GF | GA | GP | W | L | T | GF | GA |
|---|---|---|---|---|---|---|---|---|---|---|---|---|---|---|---|---|
| #1 Western Michigan †* | 24 | 19 | 4 | 1 | 4 | 3 | 0 | 57 | 98 | 51 | 42 | 34 | 7 | 1 | 167 | 86 |
| #16 Arizona State | 24 | 14 | 9 | 1 | 2 | 5 | 1 | 47 | 91 | 69 | 37 | 21 | 14 | 2 | 136 | 103 |
| #3 Denver | 24 | 15 | 8 | 1 | 2 | 1 | 0 | 45 | 89 | 59 | 44 | 31 | 12 | 1 | 174 | 94 |
| Omaha | 24 | 14 | 9 | 1 | 1 | 1 | 1 | 44 | 82 | 69 | 36 | 18 | 17 | 1 | 105 | 99 |
| #18 North Dakota | 24 | 14 | 9 | 1 | 3 | 1 | 1 | 42 | 81 | 73 | 38 | 21 | 15 | 2 | 120 | 111 |
| Colorado College | 24 | 11 | 12 | 1 | 4 | 1 | 1 | 32 | 68 | 72 | 37 | 18 | 18 | 1 | 106 | 113 |
| Minnesota Duluth | 24 | 9 | 13 | 2 | 2 | 2 | 1 | 30 | 63 | 77 | 36 | 13 | 20 | 3 | 99 | 117 |
| St. Cloud State | 24 | 7 | 16 | 1 | 2 | 3 | 0 | 23 | 53 | 79 | 36 | 14 | 21 | 1 | 79 | 110 |
| Miami | 24 | 0 | 23 | 1 | 0 | 3 | 0 | 4 | 38 | 114 | 34 | 3 | 28 | 3 | 63 | 143 |
Championship: March 22, 2025 † indicates conference regular season champion (Penrose Cup) * indicates conference tournament champion (Frozen Faceoff Championship Trophy); Rankings: USCHO.com Top 20 Poll

== Bracket ==
Teams are reseeded for the semifinals.

Quarterfinals; March 14–16
1 | Western Michigan | 6 | 6 | -
8 | St. Cloud State | 2 | 2 | -
2 | Arizona State | 4 | 6* | -
7 | Minnesota Duluth | 3 | 5 | -
(Teams are reseeded after the quarterfinals)
3 | Denver | 1 | 6 | 9
6 | Colorado College | 3 | 3 | 2
4 | Omaha | 2 | 2 | -
5 | North Dakota | 3 | 3 | -

Semifinals; March 21
1 | Western Michigan | 4
5 | North Dakota | 2
2 | Arizona State | 2
3 | Denver | 4

Championship; March 22
1 | Western Michigan | 4**
3 | Denver | 3

Note: * denotes overtime period(s)

== Results ==
Note: All game times are local.

=== Quarterfinals ===
==== (1) Western Michigan vs. (8) St. Cloud State ====
| March 14, 2025; 7:00 pm | Western Michigan | 6–2 (2–1, 3–0, 1–1) | St. Cloud State | Lawson Arena; Attendance: 3,553 |

Game reference

Hampton Slukynsky
Goalies
Isak Posch (out 40:00)
James Gray (in 40:00)
Referees:
Brian Hankes
Andrew Wilk
Linesmen:
Troy Marrett
Christopher Williams

| (Michaels, Bump) Matteo Costantini (7) – PP – 09:17 | 1–0 |
| (Valente, Bump) Matteo Costantini (8) – 19:07 | 2–0 |
| | 2–1 | 19:31 – Josh Luedtke (3) (Gardner, Thoreson) |
| (Washe, Schingoethe) Iiro Hakkarainen (10) – GW – 22:34 | 3–1 |
| (Nehring, G. Slukynsky) Tim Washe (12) – 34:58 | 4–1 |
| (G. Slukynsky, Schingoethe) Iiro Hakkarainen (11) – 37:09 | 5–1 |
| | 5–2 | 47:58 – PP – Verner Miettinen (7) (Burnevik, Wylie) |
| (unassisted) Alex Bump (18) – 49:14 | 6–2 |

8 min
Penalties
10 min
41
Shots
27

| March 15, 2025; 6:00 pm | Western Michigan | 6–2 (1–0, 1–0, 4–2) | St. Cloud State | Lawson Arena; Attendance: 3,456 |

Game reference

Hampton Slukynsky
Goalies
Isak Posch
Referees:
Brian Hankes
Andrew Wilk
Linesmen:
Troy Marrett
Christopher Williams

| (Sjolund, Valente) Alex Bump (19) – PP – 07:38 | 1–0 |
| (Knuble, Sharp) Garrett Szydlowski (3) – 37:06 | 2–0 |
| (Kramer, Crusberg-Roseen) Tim Washe (13) – GW – 41:32 | 3–0 |
| | 3–1 | 47:17 – PP – Tyson Gross (9) (Burnevik, Miettinen) |
| (Washe, Hakkarainen) Wyatt Schingoethe (4) – 50:18 | 4–1 |
| | 4–2 | 53:41 – EA – Verner Miettinen (8) (Wylie, Ingram) |
| (Costantini, Drazner) Alex Bump (20) – EN – 54:20 | 5–2 |
| (Hakkarainen, Sjolund) Tim Washe (14) – EN – 57:54 | 6–2 |

10 min
Penalties
10 min
38
Shots
20

| Western Michigan wins series 2–0 |

==== (2) Arizona State vs. (7) Minnesota Duluth ====
| March 14, 2025; 7:00 pm | Arizona State | 4–3 (2–1, 1–2, 1–0) | Minnesota Duluth | Mullett Arena; Attendance: 5,236 |

Game reference

Luke Pavicich
Goalies
Adam Gajan
Referees:
Ryan Hersey
Nathan Wieler
Linesmen:
Chase McGee
Lucas Bisbee

| (Schimek, Shlaine) Ryan Kirwan (24) – 03:51 | 1–0 |
| (unassisted) Charlie Schoen (4) – 06:44 | 2–0 |
| | 2–1 | 12:37 – Max Plante (8) (Z. Plante, Shaugabay) |
| | 2–2 | 30:29 – Dominic James (6) (Menghini, Hanson) |
| (Sillinger, Beck) Bennett Schimek (14) – 31:20 | 3–2 |
| | 3–3 | 36:28 – Zam Plante (6) (Gallatin, M. Plante) |
| (Smolen, T. Jackson) Anthony Dowd (2) – GW – 45:39 | 4–3 |

8 min
Penalties
6 min
23
Shots
31

| March 15, 2025; 6:00 pm | Arizona State | 6–5 (OT) (0–3, 3–1, 2–1, 1–0) | Minnesota Duluth | Mullett Arena; Attendance: 5,182 |

Game reference

Luke Pavicich (out 20:00)
Gibson Homer (in 20:00)
Goalies
Adam Gajan
Referees:
Ryan Hersey
Nathan Wieler
Linesmen:
Chase McGee
Lucas Bisbee

| | 0–1 | 08:22 – Max Plante (9) (unassisted) |
| | 0–2 | 16:26 – Matthew Perkins (1) (Dubinsky, Pionk) |
| | 0–3 | 18:41 – Jayson Shaugabay (11) (Z. Plante, M. Plante) |
| (Kirwan, Schoen) Artem Shlaine (15) – 21:04 | 1–3 |
| (Beck, T. Jackson) Dylan Jackson (7) – 23:11 | 2–3 |
| (Potter, Szmagaj) Noah Beck (5) – 25:01 | 3–3 |
| | 3–4 | 18:41 – Jayson Shaugabay (12) (M. Plante, Pionk) |
| (Boser, Kirwan) Artem Shlaine (16) – 49:35 | 4–4 |
| | 4–5 | 51:06 – Dominic James (14) (Menghini) |
| (T. Jackson, Lucius) Bennett Schimek (15) – PP – 53:21 | 5–5 |
| (Schoen, Szmagaj) Ryan Kirwan (25) – GW – 66:08 | 6–5 |

2 min
Penalties
4 min
39
Shots
49

| Arizona State wins series 2–0 |

==== (3) Denver vs. (6) Colorado College ====
| March 14, 2025; 7:00 pm | Denver | 1–3 (0–0, 1–0, 0–3) | Colorado College | Magness Arena; Attendance: 6,708 |

Game reference

Matt Davis
Goalies
Kaidan Mbereko
Referees:
Brandon Schmitt
Nick Krebsbach
Linesmen:
Erik Contino
Dylan Peper

| (King) Jack Devine (13) – PP – 33:38 | 1–0 |
| | 1–1 | 27:44 – PP – Ty Gallagher (7) (Wisdom, Burkholder) |
| | 1–2 | 56:17 – GW – Brady Cleveland (1) (Link, Blais-Savoie) |
| | 1–3 | 59:23 – EN – Noah Laba (6) (Middleton, Scott) |

6 min
Penalties
8 min
34
Shots
23

| March 15, 2025; 6:00 pm | Denver | 6–3 (2–2, 3–1, 1–0) | Colorado College | Magness Arena; Attendance: 6,743 |

Game reference

Matt Davis (out 59:02)
Freddie Halyk (in 59:02)
Goalies
Kaidan Mbereko (out 41:10)
Carsen Musser (in 41:10)
Referees:
Brandon Schmitt
Nick Krebsbach
Linesmen:
Erik Contino
Dylan Peper

| | 0–1 | 02:15 – Noah Laba (10) (Wisdom, Koering) |
| (unassisted) Zeev Buium (9) – PP – 05:41 | 1–1 |
| | 1–2 | 08:58 – Tommy Middleton (1) (Beck) |
| (King) Aidan Thompson (18) – PP – 14:40 | 2–2 |
| (Caponi, Fisher) Hagen Burrows (1) – 23:08 | 3–2 |
| (Thompson) Zeev Buium (10) – GW PP – 26:39 | 4–2 |
| | 4–3 | 32:09 – PP – Bret Link (7) (Veinbergs, Beckner) |
| (Burrows) Connor Caponi (3) – 38:00 | 5–3 |
| (Buckberger) Sam Harris (21) – 48:10 | 6–3 |

10 min
Penalties
22 min
36
Shots
23

| March 16, 2025; 6:00 pm | Denver | 9–2 (2–1, 3–0, 4–1) | Colorado College | Magness Arena; Attendance: 5,063 |

Game reference

Matt Davis (out 47:44)
Freddie Halyk (in 47:44)
Goalies
Carsen Musser (out 50:14)
Henry Wilder (in 50:14)
Referees:
Brandon Schmitt
Nick Krebsbach
Linesmen:
Erik Contino
Dylan Peper

| (Ashcroft, Brown) Samu Salminen (10) – 02:20 | 1–0 |
| (Burrows, Ashcroft) Garrett Brown (2) – EA – 17:27 | 2–0 |
| | 2–1 | 18:32 – Ty Gallagher (8) (Veremyev, Link) |
| (Buium, Devine) Kent Anderson (1) – GW – 23:38 | 3–1 |
| (Wright, Ashcroft) Kieran Cebrian (6) – 35:58 | 4–1 |
| (unassisted) Carter King (19) – SH – 37:29 | 5–1 |
| (Thompson, Devine) Carter King (20) – PP – 40:49 | 6–1 |
| | 6–2 | 42:49 – SH – Ty Gallagher (9) (Laba) |
| (Lorenz, Reeder) Boston Buckberger (8) – 43:38 | 7–2 |
| (Devine, Buium) Eric Pohlkamp (9) – PP – 49:28 | 8–2 |
| (Salminen, Buckberger) Rieger Lorenz (6) – PP – 50:14 | 9–2 |

8 min
Penalties
14 min
33
Shots
25

| Denver wins series 2–1 |

==== (4) Omaha vs. (5) North Dakota ====
| March 14, 2025; 7:00 pm | Omaha | 2–3 (2–1, 0–2, 0–0) | North Dakota | Baxter Arena; Attendance: 6,068 |

Game reference

Simon Latkoczy
Goalies
T. J. Semptimphelter
Referees:
Stephen Reneau
Sterling Egan
Linesmen:
Jeff Schultz
Sam Rankin

| (Stange, Glynn) Harrison Israels (10) – PP – 00:30 | 1–0 |
| | 1–1 | 07:09 – PP – Jayden Perron (10) (Schmaltz, Swanson) |
| (Israels, Risk) Jacob Guévin (7) – 14:03 | 2–1 |
| | 2–2 | 22:40 – Cade Littler (5) (Kunz, MacDonald) |
| | 2–3 | 23:03 – GW – Cade Littler (6) (MacDonald, Kunz) |

4 min
Penalties
8 min
33
Shots
18

| March 15, 2025; 7:00 pm | Omaha | 2–3 (1–0, 1–0, 0–3) | North Dakota | Baxter Arena; Attendance: 6,068 |

Game reference

Simon Latkoczy
Goalies
T. J. Semptimphelter
Referees:
Stephen Reneau
Sterling Egan
Linesmen:
Jeff Schultz
Sam Rankin

| (Israels, Krenzen) Myles Hilman (6) – 14:49 | 1–0 |
| (Krenzen, Broberg) Sam Stange (16) – 26:29 | 2–0 |
| | 2–1 | 46:10 – PP – Carter Wilkie (10) (Boisvert, McLaughlin) |
| | 2–2 | 46:39 – Cade Littler (7) (Wiebe, Kunz) |
| | 2–3 | 58:24 – GW – Jayden Jubenvill (6) (Boisvert, MacDonald) |

12 min
Penalties
13 min
34
Shots
31

| North Dakota wins series 2–0 |

=== Semifinals ===
==== (1) Western Michigan vs. (5) North Dakota ====
| March 21, 2025; 7:30 pm | Western Michigan | 4–2 (1–1, 0–0, 3–1) | North Dakota | Xcel Energy Center; Attendance: 7,532 |

Game reference

Hampton Slukynsky
Goalies
T. J. Semptimphelter
Referees:
Nathan Wieler
Ryan Hersey
Linesmen:
Tyler Liffrig
Erik Contino

| (unassisted) Alex Bump (21) – 12:33 | 1–0 |
| | 1–1 | 18:17 – PP – Sacha Boisvert (17) (McLaughlin, Berg) |
| (Valente) Grant Slukynsky (9) – 47:23 | 2–1 |
| (Nehring, Washe) Iiro Hakkarainen (12) – GW EN – 58:06 | 3–1 |
| | 3–2 | 59:10 – Sacha Boisvert (14) (McLaughlin) |
| (unassisted) Samuel Sjolund (4) – EN – 59:36 | 4–2 |

4 min
Penalties
4 min
41
Shots
25

==== (2) Arizona State vs. (3) Denver ====
| March 21, 2025; 4:00 pm | Arizona State | 2–4 (0–2, 2–0, 0–2) | Denver | Xcel Energy Center; Attendance: 7,532 |

Game reference

Luke Pavicich
Goalies
Matt Davis
Referees:
Sterling Egan
Stephen Reneau
Linesmen:
Jeff Schultz
Tony Aronson

| | 0–1 | 01:29 – Boston Buckberger (9) (Wright, Cebrian) |
| | 0–2 | 17:29 – PP – Sam Harris (14) (Thompson, King) |
| (Sillinger, Beck) Ryan Kirwan (26) – PP – 27:52 | 1–2 |
| (unassisted) Artem Shlaine (17) – 39:29 | 2–2 |
| | 2–3 | 50:08 – GW – Aidan Thompson (19) (King, Devine) |
| | 2–4 | 58:57 – EN – Connor Caponi (4) (Devine) |

4 min
Penalties
4 min
29
Shots
32

=== Championship ===
==== (1) Western Michigan vs. (3) Denver ====
| March 22, 2025; 7:30 pm | Western Michigan | 4–3 (2OT) (0–0, 0–3, 3–0, 0–0, 1–0) | Denver | Xcel Energy Center; Attendance: 5,853 |

Game reference

Hampton Slukynsky
Goalies
Matt Davis
Referees:
Brandon Schmitt
Nick Krebsbach
Linesmen:
Eric Frank
Christopher Williams

| | 0–1 | 25:46 – Jake Fisher (8) (Salminen, Brown) |
| | 0–2 | 29:05 – Eric Pohlkamp (10) (Lorenz, Wright) |
| | 0–3 | 30:27 – Zeev Buium (11) (unassisted) |
| (Valente, G. Slukynsky) Zack Sharp (5) – 43:21 | 1–3 |
| (Michaels) Alex Bump (22) – 53:19 | 2–3 |
| (Hakkarainen, Väisänen) Tim Washe (15) – 56:20 | 3–3 |
| (unassisted) Alex Bump (23) – GW – 80:22 | 4–3 |

4 min
Penalties
4 min
50
Shots
29

== Tournament awards ==
=== Frozen Faceoff All-Tournament Team ===
- G: Matt Davis (Denver)
- D: Zeev Buium (Denver)
- D: Joona Väisänen (Western Michigan)
- F: Alex Bump * (Western Michigan)
- F: Sacha Boisvert (North Dakota)
- F: Artem Shlaine (Arizona State)

* Most Valuable Player(s)
