= 2024–25 Denver Pioneers men's ice hockey season =

Collegiate team season

NCAA Tournament, National Semifinal
- Conference: 3rd NCHC
- Home ice: Magness Arena

Rankings
- USCHO: #3
- USA Hockey: #3

Record
- Overall: 31–12–1
- Conference: 15–8–1
- Home: 15–5–1
- Road: 13–5–0
- Neutral: 3–2–0

Coaches and captains
- Head coach: David Carle
- Assistant coaches: Tavis MacMillan; Dallas Ferguson; Ryan Massa
- Captain: Carter King
- Alternate captain(s): Connor Caponi; Aidan Thompson

The 2024–25 Denver Pioneers men's ice hockey season was the 76th season of play for the program and 12th in the NCHC. The Pioneers represented the University of Denver in the 2024–25 NCAA Division I men's ice hockey season, played their home games at Magness Arena and were coached by David Carle in his 7th season.

== Season ==
After winning the program's record-breaking 10th national title, Denver entered this season primed to repeat as champions. While the team did lose several key pieces to the National Hockey League, the Pioneers were able to retain their top two scorers (Jack Devine and Zeev Buium) as well as its starting goaltender, Matt Davis. To augment the already formidable lineup, coach Carle brought in five freshmen, four of whom were selected in the NHL draft, as well as two transfers, both of which were also professional prospects.

=== Early success ===
The Pioneers looked every bit the champions in the first part of the season, winning each of its first 12 games and remaining the #1 team in the nation until late November. Davis remained a stalwart in goal and didn't allow more than 2 goals in a single game during that stretch. He was aided mightily by a potent defensive corps that usually gave him an easy night; only once did Davis face 30 shots through the first 12 games. The offense, too, was firing on all cylinders with Denver averaging nearly 5 goals per game. While Divine was again leading the charge, both Aidan Thompson and Carter King fit in well on the top line. The three combined to form the strongest trio in the nation, with Devine and Thompson finishing the year atop the national scoring race. Beyone those three, however, was a bevy of secondary scorers who managed to chip in when needed, leading Denver to finish the year as the #2 overall offense.

=== Mid-season hiccup ===
Just before Thanksgiving, Denver experienced its first loss of the year when Arizona State, the newest addition to the NCHC arrived in town. The Sun Devils won the first match on a late goal, then stunned the Pioneers with three goals in less than 8 minutes in the rematch. The surprising sweep knocked Denver out of the #1 position and sent them into their holiday break with a bad taste in their mouths. When the Pios returned to the ice two weeks later, they did so against the only club who commanded a better (slightly) scoring attack than they had. Denver travelled to face Western Michigan in a showdown of top-10 teams. Denver was slow getting out of the gate and found themselves down by 3 goals entering the third. While they managed to score twice in the final period, the Pioneers' losing streak continued and the team did everything they could to end it in the rematch. Vastly outshooting the Broncos, Denver had to overcome two 1-goal deficits before King nabbed the winning goal in overtime.

The sudden struggles of the team did not end there as Denver could on manage another split weekend before pausing for the winter break. Upon their return, Denver finished out its non-conference schedule with a split against Maine. The losses saw the Pioneers fall to #6 by early January and, while Denver still was well above the cutoff line for the NCAA tournament, they could ill-afford to continue playing .500 hockey. Normally, the NCHC was one of the top conferences in the nation. However, this season the league had encountered problems in its non-conference slate. Denver had done its part by going 9–1 in its external matches but many other league members had middling or losing records out of conference. This meant that the Pioneer's strength of schedule in the second half would be weaker than normal.

=== Oscillating play ===
For the entire second half of its schedule, Denver played with an odd level of consistency. Every three or four games either the offense or defense would play poorly, causing the team to lose, but on every night, the club looked just like they had in the first month and half of the campaign. That pattern enabled the team to hold onto its ranking with Denver's spot it the polls hardly wavering over a 2-month stretch. This enabled the team to just about lock up a tournament berth by the end of the regular season. At the start of the playoffs, Denver was #9 in the PairWise rankings with several other NCHC teams still trying to fight their way into the national tournament. The Pioneers still could be knocked out but it would take a catastrophic series of events to do so. All Denver needed to do in order to guarantee their spot in the bracket was to win their quarterfinal match against Colorado College.

=== Conference tournament ===
The Tigers had fallen hard during the back stretch and completely dropped out of contention for an at-large bid. Despite this, CC and Denver were old enemies who gave one another their best efforts. As much was demonstrated in the first game when the Tiger netminder stopped 33 of 34 shots to carry his team to a 3–1 victory. Denver's offense recovered afterwards and scored 15 goals in the next two game, completely swamping the Colorado College. The scoring was spread all over the lineup with Buium topping out a 4 points in the victories.

Now that the team was assured a spot in the tournament, Denver could focus itself on the task at hand. The team met Arizona State in the semifinals up in Saint Paul with the Sun Devils desperately needing the win for their tournament hopes. However, it was Denver that started fast by scoring twice in the first period. ASU responded with a pair in the second to tie the game but Thompson's 19th of the season, midway through the third period, held up as the winning goal. The loss ended Arizona State's season and sent Denver back to the title game.

The championship match saw the conference's only two tournament entries pitted against one another as Denver faced down Western Michigan. After a sleepy first period by the Pios, they exploded in the second with 3 goals in just under 5 minutes. Unfortunately, the Broncos regained their momentum in the third and managed to slowly chip away at the Denver lead. Western tied the game with less than 4 minutes to play and forced overtime. The extra session continued to be tilted towards the Broncos as they outshot the Pioneers 16–6 in the fourth period. While Davis was the team's saving grace, all he could do was stop the team from losing, it was up to the rest of the team to actually score the winning goal. Western didn't give the Pios that chance as their opponents scored just 22 seconds into the second overtime. To add injury to insult, Boston Buchberger, one of the Pioneers most reliable defensemen, was knocked out for the remainder of the year in the first overtime. He would end up needing surgery to address his upper-body injury.

=== NCAA tournament ===
When Denver began the tournament, the team found itself in the uncomfortable position of having to travel nearly 2,000 miles east to take part in the Manchester Regional. The team's first opponent was Providence, who were well rested and only had a journey of about 100 miles from their campus. Despite the less-than-ideal circumstance as well as having to contend with a hostile crowd, Denver was able to control large stretches of the game and quiet the Friar's offense. The Pioneers got four goals, largely thanks to the efforts of Buium, before Providence was able to score a single marker. When the Friars were able to solve Davis, there was less than 9 minutes left in the match and the game was well in hand. King's empty-net goal with about 5 minutes to play all but ended the match and allowed the team to skate to a relatively easy victory.

The team's next game was a rematch of the '24 national championship with Boston College. Unfortunately for the Eagles, they continued to struggle against Davis, and the senior netminder kept up his stellar tournament play by holding BC to a single goal. Goals from Eric Pohlkamp and James Reeder were enough to secure the victory for the Pios but Buium cashed in an empty-net goal with 4 seconds remaining.

==== Frozen Four ====
In Denver's fourth appearance in the national semifinal under David Carle, the team was once again facing off against Western Michigan. With all their previous meeting this season having been decided by 1 goal, there was little separating the two and Denver was looking to get the final feather in their cap and advance to the championship game. However, the Broncos completely dominated the pace of play for the first 40 minutes. Western outshout the Pioneers 32–8 and led by a score of 2–0. With their season on the line, the Pioneers abandoned their defensive posture and threw all their efforts to the offensive side. While they only managed to get 9 shots on the WMU cage, it was just enough for Thompson and Jared Wright to break through with the latter tying the match less than two minutes before the end of regulation. Just as they had in their previous meeting, the Broncos carried the pace in the first overtime but Davis refused to allow anything to get past him. The two teams headed into double overtime for the second game in a row, the first time in 29 years that a Frozen Four match had lasted that long. Unfortunately, the similarities with the previous match did not end there and Western Michigan was able to score the winning goal just 26 seconds into the second overtime on their first shot of the period.

== Departures ==
Player	Position	Nationality	Cause
Sean Behrens	Defenseman	United States	Signed professional contract (Colorado Avalanche)
Tristan Broz	Forward	United States	Signed professional contract (Pittsburgh Penguins)
Shai Buium	Defenseman	United States	Signed professional contract (Detroit Red Wings)
Jack Caruso	Goaltender	United States	Graduation (retired)
Tristan Lemyre	Forward	Canada	Transferred to Western Michigan
Miko Matikka	Forward	Finland	Signed professional contract (Utah Hockey Club)
Lucas Ölvestad	Defenseman	Sweden	Transferred to Massachusetts
Massimo Rizzo	Forward	Canada	Signed professional contract (Philadelphia Flyers)
McKade Webster	Forward	Canada	Graduation (retired)
Alex Weiermair	Forward	United States	Left mid-season; returned to juniors (Portland Winterhawks)

== Recruiting ==
Player	Position	Nationality	Age	Notes
Hagen Burrows	Forward	United States	18	Orono, MN; selected 128th overall in 2024
Jake Fisher	Forward	United States	19	Woodbury, MN; selected 121st overall in 2024
Tory Pitner	Defenseman	United States	18	Greenwich, CT; selected 185th overall in 2024
Eric Pohlkamp	Defenseman	United States	20	Brainerd, MN; transfer from Bemidji State; selected 132nd overall in 2023
James Reeder	Forward	United States	18	Glenview, IL; selected 198th overall in 2024
Samu Salminen	Forward	Finland	21	Helsinki, FIN; transfer from Connecticut; selected 68th overall in 2021
Alec Whipple	Defenseman	United States	20	Far Hills, NJ

== Roster ==
As of August 3, 2024.

No.	Nat.	Player	Class	Pos	Height	Weight	DoB	Hometown	Previous team	NHL rights
1	(Canada)	Freddie Halyk	Sophomore	G	6' 5" (1.96 m)	210 lb (95 kg)	2003-08-27	Cochrane, Alberta	Camrose Kodiaks (AJHL)	—
2	(United States)	Tory Pitner	Freshman	D	6' 1" (1.85 m)	183 lb (83 kg)	2006-03-06	Greenwich, Connecticut	Youngstown Phantoms (USHL)	COL, 185th overall 2024
3	(Canada)	Cale Ashcroft	Sophomore	D	5' 11" (1.8 m)	190 lb (86 kg)	2004-08-05	St. Albert, Alberta	Tri-City Storm (USHL)	—
4	(United States)	Jack Devine	Senior	F	5' 11" (1.8 m)	175 lb (79 kg)	2003-10-02	Glencoe, Illinois	NTDP (USHL)	FLA, 221st overall 2022
5	(United States)	Garrett Brown	Sophomore	D	6' 3" (1.91 m)	200 lb (91 kg)	2004-04-04	San Jose, California	Waterloo Black Hawks (USHL)	WPG, 99th overall 2022
6	(United States)	Alec Whipple	Freshman	D	6' 0" (1.83 m)	181 lb (82 kg)	2004-02-09	Far Hills, New Jersey	Trail Smoke Eaters (BCHL)	TBL, 213th overall 2019
7	(United States)	Aidan Thompson (A)	Junior	F	5' 11" (1.8 m)	170 lb (77 kg)	2002-02-18	Fort Collins, Colorado	Lincoln Stars (USHL)	CHI, 90th overall 2022
9	(Canada)	Boston Buckberger	Sophomore	D	5' 11" (1.8 m)	180 lb (82 kg)	2003-06-01	Saskatoon, Saskatchewan	Lincoln Stars (USHL)	—
11	(Finland)	Samu Salminen	Junior	F	6' 2" (1.88 m)	182 lb (83 kg)	2003-04-09	Helsinki, Finland	Connecticut (HEA)	NJD, 68th overall 2021
12	(United States)	Sam Harris	Sophomore	F	6' 1" (1.85 m)	190 lb (86 kg)	2003-10-14	San Diego, California	Sioux Falls Stampede (USHL)	MTL, 133rd overall 2023
13	(United States)	Hagen Burrows	Freshman	F	6' 3" (1.91 m)	176 lb (80 kg)	2005-10-13	Orono, Minnesota	Sioux City Musketeers (USHL)	TBL, 128th overall 2024
14	(Canada)	Rieger Lorenz	Junior	F	6' 2" (1.88 m)	192 lb (87 kg)	2004-03-30	Calgary, Alberta	Okotoks Oilers (AJHL)	MIN, 56th overall 2022
15	(Canada)	Carter King (C)	Senior	F	5' 10" (1.78 m)	185 lb (84 kg)	2001-08-30	Calgary, Alberta	Surrey Eagles (BCHL)	—
17	(United States)	Peter LaJoy	Sophomore	F	5' 7" (1.7 m)	165 lb (75 kg)	2002-02-27	Evergreen, Colorado	Danbury Jr. Hat Tricks (NAHL)	—
18	(United States)	Jared Wright	Junior	F	6' 2" (1.88 m)	176 lb (80 kg)	2002-11-22	Burnsville, Minnesota	Omaha Lancers (USHL)	LAK, 169th overall 2022
19	(United States)	Jake Fisher	Freshman	F	6' 2" (1.88 m)	192 lb (87 kg)	2005-03-27	Woodbury, Minnesota	Fargo Force (USHL)	COL, 121st overall 2024
21	(Canada)	Kent Anderson	Junior	D	6' 3" (1.91 m)	205 lb (93 kg)	2003-11-13	Calgary, Alberta	Green Bay Gamblers (USHL)	—
22	(United States)	Connor Caponi (A)	Graduate	F	5' 9" (1.75 m)	186 lb (84 kg)	2000-03-20	Milwaukee, Wisconsin	Waterloo Black Hawks (USHL)	—
23	(United States)	Eric Pohlkamp	Sophomore	D	5' 11" (1.8 m)	205 lb (93 kg)	2004-03-23	Brainerd, Minnesota	Bemidji State (USHL)	SJS, 132nd overall 2023
24	(United States)	Kieran Cebrian	Sophomore	F	6' 2" (1.88 m)	195 lb (88 kg)	2003-03-31	Denver, Colorado	Tri-City Storm (USHL)	—
27	(United States)	James Reeder	Freshman	F	5' 10" (1.78 m)	168 lb (76 kg)	2005-10-06	Glenview, Illinois	Dubuque Fighting Saints (USHL)	LAK, 198th overall 2024
28	(United States)	Zeev Buium	Sophomore	D	6' 2" (1.88 m)	180 lb (82 kg)	2005-12-07	San Diego, California	USNTDP (USHL)	MIN, 12th overall 2024
30	(Canada)	Paxton Geisel	Sophomore	G	6' 1" (1.85 m)	190 lb (86 kg)	2004-01-18	Estevan, Saskatchewan	Muskegon Lumberjacks (USHL)	—
35	(Canada)	Matt Davis	Senior	G	6' 0" (1.83 m)	179 lb (81 kg)	2001-06-16	Calgary, Alberta	Green Bay Gamblers (USHL)	—
39	(United States)	Alex Weiermair	Sophomore	F	6' 1" (1.85 m)	190 lb (86 kg)	2005-05-10	Los Angeles, California	USNTDP (USHL)	—

== Standings ==
2024–25 National Collegiate Hockey Conference Standings
	Conference record										Overall record					
	GP	W	L	T	OTW	OTL	SW	PTS	GF	GA	GP	W	L	T	GF	GA
#1 Western Michigan †*	24	19	4	1	4	3	0	57	98	51	42	34	7	1	167	86
#16 Arizona State	24	14	9	1	2	5	1	47	91	69	37	21	14	2	136	103
#3 Denver	24	15	8	1	2	1	0	45	89	59	44	31	12	1	174	94
Omaha	24	14	9	1	1	1	1	44	82	69	36	18	17	1	105	99
#18 North Dakota	24	14	9	1	3	1	1	42	81	73	38	21	15	2	120	111
Colorado College	24	11	12	1	4	1	1	32	68	72	37	18	18	1	106	113
Minnesota Duluth	24	9	13	2	2	2	1	30	63	77	36	13	20	3	99	117
St. Cloud State	24	7	16	1	2	3	0	23	53	79	36	14	21	1	79	110
Miami	24	0	23	1	0	3	0	4	38	114	34	3	28	3	63	143
Championship: March 22, 2025 † indicates conference regular season champion (Penrose Cup) * indicates conference tournament champion (Frozen Faceoff Championship Trophy); Rankings: USCHO.com Top 20 Poll

== Schedule and results ==
Date	Time	Opponent^{#}	Rank^{#}	Site	TV	Decision	Result	Attendance	Record
Regular Season
October 5	8:07 pm	at Alaska Anchorage*	#1	Avis Alaska Sports Complex • Anchorage, Alaska		Davis	W 6–2	710	1–0–0
October 6	7:07 pm	at Alaska Anchorage*	#1	Avis Alaska Sports Complex • Anchorage, Alaska		Davis	W 4–1	659	2–0–0
October 18	7:00 pm	#19 Northeastern*	#1	Magness Arena • Denver, Colorado		Davis	W 5–2	6,837	3–0–0
October 19	7:00 pm	#19 Northeastern*	#1	Magness Arena • Denver, Colorado		Davis	W 5–2	7,051	4–0–0
October 25	7:00 pm	#20 Wisconsin*	#1	Magness Arena • Denver, Colorado		Davis	W 4–2	6,935	5–0–0
October 26	7:00 pm	#20 Wisconsin*	#1	Magness Arena • Denver, Colorado		Davis	W 6–1	6,560	6–0–0
November 1	5:00 pm	at Yale*	#1	Ingalls Rink • New Haven, Connecticut	ESPN+	Davis	W 6–0	1,498	7–0–0
November 2	5:00 pm	at Yale*	#1	Ingalls Rink • New Haven, Connecticut	ESPN+	Halyk	W 5–1	2,162	8–0–0
November 8	7:00 pm	Lindenwood*	#1	Magness Arena • Denver, Colorado		Davis	W 4–1	6,369	9–0–0
November 9	7:00 pm	Lindenwood*	#1	Magness Arena • Denver, Colorado		Davis	W 4–1	6,582	10–0–0
November 15	6:07 pm	at #9 North Dakota	#1	Ralph Engelstad Arena • Grand Forks, North Dakota (Rivalry)	Midco Sports	Davis	W 5–2	11,597	11–0–0 (1–0–0)
November 16	5:07 pm	at #9 North Dakota	#1	Ralph Engelstad Arena • Grand Forks, North Dakota (Rivalry)	Midco Sports	Davis	W 3–2	11,633	12–0–0 (2–0–0)
November 22	7:00 pm	Arizona State	#1	Magness Arena • Denver, Colorado		Davis	L 2–3	6,304	12–1–0 (2–1–0)
November 23	6:00 pm	Arizona State	#1	Magness Arena • Denver, Colorado		Davis	L 2–5	6,490	12–2–0 (2–2–0)
December 6	5:00 pm	at #7 Western Michigan	#2	Lawson Arena • Kalamazoo, Michigan		Davis	L 2–3	3,586	12–3–0 (2–3–0)
December 7	4:00 pm	at #7 Western Michigan	#2	Lawson Arena • Kalamazoo, Michigan		Davis	W 3–2 ^{OT}	3,930	13–3–0 (3–3–0)
December 13	7:00 pm	at #10т Colorado College	#4	Ed Robson Arena • Colorado Springs, Colorado (Rivalry)	SOCO CW	Davis	L 4–5	3,952	13–4–0 (3–4–0)
December 14	7:00 pm	#10т Colorado College	#4	Magness Arena • Denver, Colorado (Rivalry)	Altitude 2	Davis	W 2–1	6,606	14–4–0 (4–4–0)
December 28	6:00 pm	#3 (Note: ACHA rank) UNLV*	#5	Magness Arena • Denver, Colorado (Exhibition)		Davis	T 6–6 ^{SOL}	6,455	
January 3	5:00 pm	at #7 Maine*	#6	Alfond Arena • Orono, Maine	ESPNU	Davis	W 2–1	5,043	15–4–0
January 4	5:00 pm	at #7 Maine*	#6	Alfond Arena • Orono, Maine	ESPN+	Davis	L 1–2	5,043	15–5–0
January 10	7:00 pm	Miami	#6	Magness Arena • Denver, Colorado		Davis	W 4–1	6,585	16–5–0 (5–4–0)
January 11	6:00 pm	Miami	#6	Magness Arena • Denver, Colorado		Davis	W 6–2	6,719	17–5–0 (6–4–0)
January 24	6:07 pm	at Minnesota Duluth	#5	AMSOIL Arena • Duluth, Minnesota		Halyk	L 3–4	5,986	17–6–0 (6–5–0)
January 25	5:07 pm	at Minnesota Duluth	#5	AMSOIL Arena • Duluth, Minnesota		Davis	W 2–1	6,229	18–6–0 (7–5–0)
January 31	7:00 pm	Omaha	#5	Magness Arena • Denver, Colorado		Davis	T 3–3 ^{SOL}	6,493	18–6–1 (7–5–1)
February 1	6:00 pm	Omaha	#5	Magness Arena • Denver, Colorado		Davis	W 11–2	6,657	19–6–1 (8–5–1)
February 7	7:00 pm	at #12 Arizona State	#6	Mullett Arena • Tempe, Arizona	CBSSN, Fox 10 Xtra	Davis	W 5–4 ^{OT}	5,215	20–6–1 (9–5–1)
February 8	5:00 pm	at #12 Arizona State	#6	Mullett Arena • Tempe, Arizona	Fox 10 Xtra	Davis	L 5–6 ^{OT}	5,191	20–7–1 (9–6–1)
February 14	7:00 pm	#17 North Dakota	#6	Magness Arena • Denver, Colorado (Rivalry)		Davis	W 4–0	6,344	21–7–1 (10–6–1)
February 15	6:00 pm	#17 North Dakota	#6	Magness Arena • Denver, Colorado (Rivalry)		Halyk	L 1–3	6,740	21–8–1 (10–7–1)
February 21	5:05 pm	at Miami	#6	Steve Cady Arena • Oxford, Ohio		Davis	W 5–1	1,507	22–8–1 (11–7–1)
February 22	5:05 pm	at Miami	#6	Steve Cady Arena • Oxford, Ohio		Halyk	W 5–2	2,328	23–8–1 (12–7–1)
February 28	7:00 pm	St. Cloud State	#6	Magness Arena • Denver, Colorado		Davis	W 3–1	6,417	24–8–1 (13–7–1)
March 1	6:00 pm	St. Cloud State	#6	Magness Arena • Denver, Colorado		Davis	L 1–2	6,518	24–9–1 (13–8–1)
March 7	7:00 pm	#20т Colorado College	#7	Magness Arena • Denver, Colorado (Rivalry)	Altitude	Davis	W 4–1	7,023	25–9–1 (14–8–1)
March 8	6:00 pm	at #20т Colorado College	#7	Ed Robson Arena • Colorado Springs, Colorado (Rivalry)		Davis	W 4–3	3,532	26–9–1 (15–8–1)
NCHC Tournament
March 14	7:00 pm	Colorado College*	#6	Magness Arena • Denver, Colorado (NCHC Quarterfinal Game 1; Rivalry)		Davis	L 1–3	6,708	26–10–1
March 15	6:00 pm	Colorado College*	#6	Magness Arena • Denver, Colorado (NCHC Quarterfinal Game 2; Rivalry)		Davis	W 6–3	6,743	27–10–1
March 16	6:00 pm	Colorado College*	#6	Magness Arena • Denver, Colorado (NCHC Quarterfinal Game 3; Rivalry)		Davis	W 9–2	5,063	28–10–1
March 21	3:00 pm	vs. #11 Arizona State*	#6	Xcel Energy Center • Saint Paul, Minnesota (NCHC Semifinal)	CBSSN	Davis	W 4–2	7,532	29–10–1
March 22	6:30 pm	vs. #3 Western Michigan*	#6	Xcel Energy Center • Saint Paul, Minnesota (NCHC Championship)	CBSSN	Davis	L 3–4 ^{2OT}	5,853	29–11–1
NCAA Tournament
March 28	3:30 pm	vs. #10 Providence*	#6	SNHU Arena • Manchester, New Hampshire (Regional Semifinal)	ESPN+	Davis	W 5–1	7,368	30–11–1
March 30	5:00 pm	vs. #2 Boston College*	#6	SNHU Arena • Manchester, New Hampshire (Regional Final)	ESPN2	Davis	W 3–1	6,802	31–11–1
April 10	5:00 pm	vs. #3 Western Michigan*	#6	Enterprise Center • St. Louis, Missouri (National Semifinals)	ESPN2	Davis	L 2–3 ^{2OT}		31–12–1
*Non-conference game. ^{#}Rankings from USCHO.com Poll. All times are in Mountain Time. Source:

== Scoring statistics ==
Name	Position	Games	Goals	Assists	Points	PIM
Jack Devine	RW	44	13	44	57	32
Aidan Thompson	C/LW	44	21	34	55	26
Zeev Buium	D	41	13	35	48	44
Carter King	C/LW	44	21	22	43	16
Sam Harris	LW	43	23	12	35	42
Eric Pohlkamp	D	44	11	24	35	22
Boston Buckberger	D	41	9	21	30	22
Samu Salminen	C/LW	44	10	18	28	24
James Reeder	RW	44	11	10	21	2
Rieger Lorenz	C/LW	44	6	14	20	18
Jared Wright	RW	44	9	8	17	6
Jake Fisher	C/LW	42	8	7	15	12
Kieran Cebrian	F	44	6	9	15	16
Cale Ashcroft	D	44	4	8	12	8
Connor Caponi	F	42	5	4	9	65
Hagen Burrows	C/W	39	1	8	9	14
Garrett Brown	D	42	2	6	8	33
Kent Anderson	D	44	1	7	8	14
Alex Weiermair	C	9	0	2	2	2
Tory Pitner	D	40	0	1	1	21
Peter Lajoy	F	5	0	0	0	2
Alec Whipple	D	7	0	0	0	0
Matt Davis	G	40	0	1	1	0
Freddie Halyk	G	9	0	0	0	0
Bench	–	–	–	–	–	0
Total			174	295	469	441

== Goaltending statistics ==
Name	Games	Minutes	Wins	Losses	Ties	Goals against	Saves	Shut outs	SV %	GAA
Matt Davis	40	2374:35	29	10	1	82	997	1	.924	2.07
Freddie Halyk	9	287:50	2	2	0	10	107	0	.915	2.08
Empty Net	-	31:16	-	-	-	2	-	-	-	-
Total	44	2693:41	31	12	1	94	1104	2	.922	2.09

Note: Davis and Halyk shared the shutout against North Dakota on February 14.

== Rankings ==
Poll	Week																											
Poll	Pre	1	2	3	4	5	6	7	8	9	10	11	12	13	14	15	16	17	18	19	20	21	22	23	24	25	26	27 (Final)
USCHO.com	1 (42)	1 (43)	1 (47)	1 (48)	1 (48)	1 (48)	1 (48)	1 (50)	2 (7)	2 (4)	4	5	–	6 (1)	6	7 (1)	5	5	6	6	6	6	7	6	6	6	–	3
USA Hockey	1 (27)	1 (26)	1 (33)	1 (33)	1 (33)	1 (33)	1 (34)	1 (34)	2 (5)	2 (2)	4 (1)	5	–	6	6	6т (1)	5	5	6	6	7	6	7	6	6	6	2 (4)	3

Note: USCHO did not release a poll in week 12 or 26.
Note: USA Hockey did not release a poll in week 12.

== Awards and honors ==
Player	Award	Ref
Zeev Buium	AHCA All-American West First Team	
Jack Devine	AHCA All-American West First Team	
Zeev Buium	NCHC Player of the Year	
Zeev Buium	NCHC Offensive Defenseman of the Year	
Matt Davis	NCHC Scholar-Athlete of the Year	
Zeev Buium	All-NCHC First Team	
Jack Devine	All-NCHC First Team	
Aidan Thompson	All-NCHC Second Team	
Eric Pohlkamp	All-NCHC Third Team	
Sam Harris	All-NCHC Third Team	
Carter King	All-NCHC Third Team	
Matt Davis	NCHC Frozen Faceoff All-Tournament Team	
Zeev Buium	NCHC Frozen Faceoff All-Tournament Team	
Zeev Buium	NCAA All-Tournament team	

== 2025 NHL entry draft ==
Round	Pick	Player	NHL team
3	88	Kristian Epperson ^{†}	Los Angeles Kings
5	130	Ryan Miller ^{†}	Pittsburgh Penguins
7	196	Brendan McMorrow ^{†}	Los Angeles Kings

† incoming freshman
