= 2024–25 Minnesota Duluth Bulldogs men's ice hockey season =

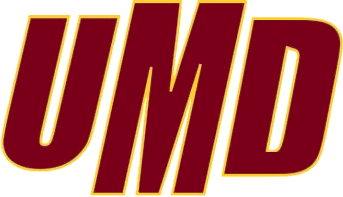
- Conference: 7th NCHC
- Home ice: AMSOIL Arena

Rankings
- USCHO: NR
- USA Hockey: NR

Record
- Overall: 13–20–3
- Conference: 9–13–2
- Home: 7–9–3
- Road: 6–11–0

Coaches and captains
- Head coach: Scott Sandelin
- Assistant coaches: Adam Krause; Cody Chupp; Brant Nicklin
- Captain: Dominic James
- Alternate captain(s): Aiden Dubinsky; Owen Gallatin; Joey Pierce

The 2024–25 Minnesota Duluth Bulldogs men's ice hockey season was the 81st season of play for the program and 12th in the NCHC. The Bulldogs represented the University of Minnesota Duluth in the 2024–25 NCAA Division I men's ice hockey season, played their home games at AMSOIL Arena and were coached by Scott Sandelin in his 25th season.

== Season ==
There was hope at the start of the season that Minnesota Duluth would be able to climb its way back to being a contending team. Not only was the team adding five players who had been selected in the NHL draft, but the defense, upon which the Bulldogs had found great success recently, was led by a bevy of upperclassmen. Unfortunately, as soon as the team hit the ice they discovered that their highly-touted freshman goaltender, Adam Gajan, wasn't quite ready for the college game. UMD was able to win five games in the first two months but four of those matches were against two of the worst teams in college hockey that year (Stonehill and Miami). To make matters worse, Gajan suffered an ankle injury in late November and the Bulldogs were forced to turn to another freshman, Klayton Knapp, to hold the fort in goal.

With the situation in goal as unsettled at it was, the rest of the team's performance was almost immaterial. The defense did play better than they had the previous year, allowing significantly fewer shots to reach their goaltenders. The offense missed the services of Ben Steeves, who had signed a professional contract in the offseason, but the Bulldogs were buoyed by the return of Dominic James who had missed all but two games the previous year due to a separated shoulder. The team scored at nearly the exact same rate as they had in '24 (2.75 vs. 2.86) even through they were without the serviced of another one of their freshman draftees, Max Plante, for several weeks early in the year.

After their terrible first half, the team looked to have settled down at the beginning of January. After posing four wins in five games, all against ranked opponents, Duluth was nearly back to a .500 record. However, come February the scoring dried up and the team struggled down the stretch. By then Gajan had returned from his injury and was finally playing as expected but the Bulldogs were unable to capitalize on his improved performance. The team finished seventh in the standings and that sent them to their first postseason meeting with Arizona State.

Gajan's poor play resurfaced in the playoffs and he allowed 4 goals in the first game on just 23 shots. Duluth did what it could and twice was able to tie the game in the second thanks to the Plante brothers. However, when ASU got a lead in the third the Bulldogs were unable to respond. UMD came out guns-blazing in the rematch and scored three goals in the first. Gajan stopped all 17 shots in the period to stake his team to a huge lead but then collapsed in the second. Just after the 5-minute mark of the third, Arizona State was able to tie the game. Twice more, Minnesota Duluth was able to get into the lead but the Sun Devils were able to reply with a goal of their own and ended up forcing the game into overtime. Despite widely outshooting the home team in the final two periods, it was ASU that found the winning goal on what looked to be a harmless shot from a sharp angle.

=== Will Francis ===
Senior defenseman Will Francis had been diagnosed with acute lymphoblastic leukemia in March of 2020. After sitting out the entire COVID-19 season in order to receive treatment, he began attending Minnesota Duluth but was only able to play 37 games over four years due to several relapses. Through several rounds of chemotherapy and a bone marrow transplant he was able to not only battle the disease back into remission and earn a degree in communications, but he managed to continue his playing career. His final match with UMD came in their penultimate game but that wasn't his final appearance on the ice. A draft pick of the Anaheim Ducks, Francis signed a professional contract after the season and appeared in 3 games for the San Diego Gulls.

== Departures ==
Player	Position	Nationality	Cause
Blake Biondi	Forward	United States	Graduate transfer to Notre Dame
Darian Gotz	Defenseman	United States	Graduation (signed with Aalborg Pirates)
Luke Johnson	Forward	United States	Transferred to Alaska
Kyler Kleven	Forward	United States	Transferred to Niagara
Luke Loheit	Forward	United States	Graduation (signed with Kansas City Mavericks)
Connor McMenamin	Forward	United States	Graduation (signed with Reading Royals)
Quinn Olson	Forward	Canada	Graduation (signed with Ontario Reign)
Cole Spicer	Defenseman	United States	Returned to juniors (Dubuque Fighting Saints)
Ben Steeves	Forward	United States	Signed professional contract (Florida Panthers)
Zach Stejskal	Goaltender	United States	Graduation (signed with Hokki)
Matthew Thiessen	Goaltender	Canada	Graduation (signed with Winkler Royals)

== Recruiting ==
Player	Position	Nationality	Age	Notes
Callum Arnott	Forward	Canada	20	King City, ON
Blake Bechen	Forward	United States	19	Dubuque, IA
Harper Bentz	Forward	United States	19	Moorhead, MN
Adam Gajan	Goaltender	Slovakia	20	Poprad, SVK; selected 35th overall in 2023
Ty Hanson	Defenseman	United States	19	Hermantown, MN
Adam Kleber	Defenseman	United States	18	Chaska, MN; selected 42nd overall in 2024
Klayton Knapp	Goaltender	United States	20	Sylvania, OH
Joey Molenaar	Forward	United States	24	Minnetonka, MN; graduate transfer from St. Cloud State
Max Plante	Forward	United States	18	Hermantown, MN; selected 47th overall in 2024
Zam Plante	Forward	United States	20	Hermantown, MN; selected 150th overall in 2022
Jayson Shaugabay	Forward	United States	19	Warroad, MN; selected 115th overall in 2023
Trevor Stachowiak	Forward	United States	21	Dallas, TX

== Roster ==
As of August 20, 2024.

No.	Nat.	Player	Class	Pos	Height	Weight	DoB	Hometown	Previous team	NHL rights
2	(United States)	Ty Hanson	Freshman	D	5' 9" (1.75 m)	170 lb (77 kg)	2005-04-21	Hermantown, Minnesota	Sioux City Musketeers (USHL)	—
6	(United States)	Adam Kleber	Freshman	D	6' 6" (1.98 m)	214 lb (97 kg)	2006-03-24	Chaska, Minnesota	Lincoln Stars (USHL)	BUF, 42nd overall 2024
8	(United States)	Aaron Pionk	Sophomore	D	6' 0" (1.83 m)	175 lb (79 kg)	2003-01-16	Hermantown, Minnesota	Waterloo Black Hawks (USHL)	MIN, 149th overall 2023
10	(United States)	Max Plante	Freshman	F	5' 11" (1.8 m)	176 lb (80 kg)	2006-02-20	Hermantown, Minnesota	USNTDP (USHL)	DET, 47th overall 2024
12	(United States)	Jack Smith	Junior	F	6' 0" (1.83 m)	190 lb (86 kg)	2002-07-06	St. Cloud, Minnesota	Sioux Falls Stampede (USHL)	MTL, 102nd overall 2020
13	(United States)	Jayson Shaugabay	Freshman	F	5' 9" (1.75 m)	165 lb (75 kg)	2005-04-05	Warroad, Minnesota	Green Bay Gamblers (USHL)	TBL, 115th overall 2023
15	(United States)	Harper Bentz	Freshman	F	6' 0" (1.83 m)	176 lb (80 kg)	2004-11-29	Moorhead, Minnesota	Fargo Force (USHL)	—
16	(United States)	Blake Bechen	Freshman	F	6' 0" (1.83 m)	187 lb (85 kg)	2005-01-25	Dubuque, Iowa	Green Bay Gamblers (USHL)	—
17	(United States)	Dominic James (C)	Senior	F	6' 0" (1.83 m)	180 lb (82 kg)	2002-07-03	Plymouth, Michigan	Lincoln Stars (USHL)	CHI, 173rd overall 2022
18	(United States)	Joey Pierce (A)	Junior	D	6' 0" (1.83 m)	208 lb (94 kg)	2002-10-02	Hermantown, Minnesota	Lincoln Stars (USHL)	—
19	(Canada)	Riley Bodnarchuk	Junior	D	6' 4" (1.93 m)	205 lb (93 kg)	2001-06-01	Okotoks, Alberta	Okotoks Oilers (AJHL)	—
20	(United States)	Owen Gallatin (A)	Senior	D	5' 8" (1.73 m)	167 lb (76 kg)	2002-06-17	Hugo, Minnesota	Fargo Force (USHL)	—
21	(Canada)	Braden Fischer	Sophomore	F	6' 1" (1.85 m)	185 lb (84 kg)	2002-10-02	Winnipeg, Manitoba	Minot Minotauros (NAHL)	—
22	(United States)	Joe Molenaar	Graduate	F	6' 1" (1.85 m)	175 lb (79 kg)	1999-10-16	Minnetonka, Minnesota	St. Cloud State (NCHC)	—
23	(United States)	Will Francis	Senior	D	6' 5" (1.96 m)	215 lb (98 kg)	2000-11-16	Saint Paul, Minnesota	Cedar Rapids RoughRiders (USHL)	ANA, 163rd overall 2019
24	(Canada)	Kyle Bettens	Junior	F	6' 3" (1.91 m)	215 lb (98 kg)	2001-07-04	Winnipeg, Manitoba	Youngstown Phantoms (USHL)	—
25	(Canada)	Callum Arnott	Freshman	F	6' 1" (1.85 m)	170 lb (77 kg)	2004-01-12	King City, Ontario	Penticton Vees (BCHL)	—
26	(United States)	Anthony Menghini	Sophomore	F	5' 10" (1.78 m)	184 lb (83 kg)	2002-12-03	Baxter, Minnesota	Fargo Force (USHL)	—
27	(United States)	Zam Plante	Freshman	F	5' 11" (1.8 m)	176 lb (80 kg)	2004-08-24	Hermantown, Minnesota	Fargo Force (USHL)	PIT, 150th overall 2022
28	(United States)	Aiden Dubinsky (A)	Junior	D	6' 0" (1.83 m)	180 lb (82 kg)	2004-04-28	Highland Park, Illinois	Tri-City Storm (USHL)	—
30	(Slovakia)	Adam Gajan	Freshman	G	6' 3" (1.91 m)	187 lb (85 kg)	2004-05-06	Poprad, Slovakia	Green Bay Gamblers (USHL)	CHI, 35th overall 2023
31	(United States)	Zach Sandy	Junior	G	6' 0" (1.83 m)	175 lb (79 kg)	2002-12-07	Fargo, North Dakota	Minot Minotauros (NAHL)	—
33	(United States)	Carter Loney	Senior	F	5' 10" (1.78 m)	167 lb (76 kg)	2002-08-02	Columbus, Ohio	Sioux City Musketeers (USHL)	—
34	(Canada)	Matthew Perkins	Sophomore	F	5' 11" (1.8 m)	156 lb (71 kg)	2004-01-21	Balgonie, Saskatchewan	Youngstown Phantoms (USHL)	VAN, 119th overall 2023
37	(United States)	Klayton Knapp	Freshman	G	6' 0" (1.83 m)	190 lb (86 kg)	2003-10-07	Sylvania, Ohio	Bismarck Bobcats (NAHL)	—
38	(Canada)	Luke Bast	Senior	D	5' 10" (1.78 m)	178 lb (81 kg)	2000-11-28	Red Deer, Alberta	North Dakota (NCHC)	—
39	(United States)	Trevor Stachowiak	Freshman	F	6' 2" (1.88 m)	196 lb (89 kg)	2003-02-25	Dallas, Texas	Minot Minotauros (NAHL)	—

== Standings ==
2024–25 National Collegiate Hockey Conference Standings
	Conference record										Overall record					
	GP	W	L	T	OTW	OTL	SW	PTS	GF	GA	GP	W	L	T	GF	GA
#1 Western Michigan †*	24	19	4	1	4	3	0	57	98	51	42	34	7	1	167	86
#16 Arizona State	24	14	9	1	2	5	1	47	91	69	37	21	14	2	136	103
#3 Denver	24	15	8	1	2	1	0	45	89	59	44	31	12	1	174	94
Omaha	24	14	9	1	1	1	1	44	82	69	36	18	17	1	105	99
#18 North Dakota	24	14	9	1	3	1	1	42	81	73	38	21	15	2	120	111
Colorado College	24	11	12	1	4	1	1	32	68	72	37	18	18	1	106	113
Minnesota Duluth	24	9	13	2	2	2	1	30	63	77	36	13	20	3	99	117
St. Cloud State	24	7	16	1	2	3	0	23	53	79	36	14	21	1	79	110
Miami	24	0	23	1	0	3	0	4	38	114	34	3	28	3	63	143
Championship: March 22, 2025 † indicates conference regular season champion (Penrose Cup) * indicates conference tournament champion (Frozen Faceoff Championship Trophy); Rankings: USCHO.com Top 20 Poll

== Schedule and results ==
Date	Time	Opponent^{#}	Rank^{#}	Site	TV	Decision	Result	Attendance	Record
Regular Season
October 5	5:07 pm	Bemidji State*	#18	AMSOIL Arena • Duluth, Minnesota		Sandy	L 3–4 ^{OT}	6,587	0–1–0
October 6	2:07 pm	Manitoba*	#18	AMSOIL Arena • Duluth, Minnesota (Exhibition)		Gajan	W 7–2	4,866	
October 11	6:15 pm	at Massachusetts Lowell*		Tsongas Center • Lowell, Massachusetts	ESPN+	Gajan	W 4–2	6,241	1–1–0
October 12	5:05 pm	at Massachusetts Lowell*		Tsongas Center • Lowell, Massachusetts	ESPN+	Gajan	L 1–4	3,701	1–2–0
October 18	7:07 pm	#6 Minnesota*		AMSOIL Arena • Duluth, Minnesota (Rivalry)	Fox 9+	Gajan	L 5–7	6,444	1–3–0
October 19	6:07 pm	#6 Minnesota*		AMSOIL Arena • Duluth, Minnesota (Rivalry)	Fox 9+	Gajan	L 1–5	7,066	1–4–0
October 25	7:07 pm	Stonehill*		AMSOIL Arena • Duluth, Minnesota		Gajan	W 5–1	4,103	2–4–0
October 26	6:07 pm	Stonehill*		AMSOIL Arena • Duluth, Minnesota		Gajan	W 2–1	4,560	3–4–0
November 8	7:07 pm	#10 North Dakota		AMSOIL Arena • Duluth, Minnesota		Gajan	L 3–7	6,120	3–5–0 (0–1–0)
November 9	6:07 pm	#10 North Dakota		AMSOIL Arena • Duluth, Minnesota		Gajan	L 1–4	6,520	3–6–0 (0–2–0)
November 15	6:05 pm	at Miami		Steve Cady Arena • Oxford, Ohio		Gajan	W 5–0	2,333	4–6–0 (1–2–0)
November 16	6:05 pm	at Miami		Steve Cady Arena • Oxford, Ohio		Gajan	W 7–2	2,391	5–6–0 (2–2–0)
November 22	7:07 pm	#9 Western Michigan		AMSOIL Arena • Duluth, Minnesota		Gajan	L 2–5	5,057	5–7–0 (2–3–0)
November 23	5:07 pm	#9 Western Michigan		AMSOIL Arena • Duluth, Minnesota		Gajan	L 1–4	5,831	5–8–0 (2–4–0)
December 6	8:00 pm	at #19 Arizona State		Mullett Arena • Tempe, Arizona	FOX 10 Xtra	Knapp	L 3–5	5,017	5–9–0 (2–5–0)
December 7	6:00 pm	at #19 Arizona State		Mullett Arena • Tempe, Arizona		Sandy	L 2–3 ^{OT}	5,009	5–10–0 (2–6–0)
December 31	7:07 pm	at Bemidji State*		Sanford Center • Bemidji, Minnesota	Midco Sports+	Knapp	W 4–2	3,142	6–10–0
January 3	7:07 pm	Alaska*		AMSOIL Arena • Duluth, Minnesota		Knapp	T 2–2 ^{OT}	5,128	6–10–1
January 4	6:07 pm	Alaska*		AMSOIL Arena • Duluth, Minnesota		Knapp	L 1–2 ^{OT}	5,172	6–11–1
January 10	7:07 pm	#10 St. Cloud State		AMSOIL Arena • Duluth, Minnesota		Knapp	W 2–0	5,012	7–11–1 (3–6–0)
January 11	6:07 pm	#10 St. Cloud State		AMSOIL Arena • Duluth, Minnesota		Knapp	W 5–2	5,512	8–11–1 (4–6–0)
January 17	8:00 pm	at #18 Colorado College		Ed Robson Arena • Colorado Springs, Colorado	CBSSN	Knapp	L 2–7	3,492	8–12–1 (4–7–0)
January 18	7:00 pm	at #18 Colorado College		Ed Robson Arena • Colorado Springs, Colorado		Knapp	W 4–1	3,525	9–12–1 (5–7–0)
January 24	7:07 pm	#5 Denver		AMSOIL Arena • Duluth, Minnesota		Knapp	W 4–3	5,986	10–12–1 (6–7–0)
January 25	6:07 pm	#5 Denver		AMSOIL Arena • Duluth, Minnesota		Knapp	L 1–2	6,229	10–13–1 (6–8–0)
February 7	7:07 pm	at Omaha		Baxter Arena • Omaha, Nebraska		Knapp	L 1–4	7,443	10–14–1 (6–9–0)
February 8	7:07 pm	at Omaha		Baxter Arena • Omaha, Nebraska		Gajan	L 2–5	7,019	10–15–1 (6–10–0)
February 14	7:07 pm	#10 Arizona State		AMSOIL Arena • Duluth, Minnesota		Knapp	W 3–2 ^{OT}	5,579	11–15–1 (7–10–0)
February 15	6:07 pm	#10 Arizona State		AMSOIL Arena • Duluth, Minnesota		Knapp	T 3–3 ^{SOL}	5,701	11–15–2 (7–10–1)
February 21	7:07 pm	at #17 North Dakota		Ralph Engelstad Arena • Grand Forks, North Dakota	Midco	Gajan	L 2–4	11,602	11–16–2 (7–11–1)
February 22	6:07 pm	at #17 North Dakota		Ralph Engelstad Arena • Grand Forks, North Dakota	Midco	Knapp	L 1–6	11,640	11–17–2 (7–12–1)
February 28	7:07 pm	Miami		AMSOIL Arena • Duluth, Minnesota		Gajan	W 3–2 ^{OT}	5,530	12–17–2 (8–12–1)
March 1	6:07 pm	Miami		AMSOIL Arena • Duluth, Minnesota		Gajan	T 1–1 ^{SOW}	5,556	12–17–3 (8–12–2)
March 7	7:30 pm	at St. Cloud State		Herb Brooks National Hockey Center • St. Cloud, Minnesota	Fox 9+	Gajan	L 2–3 ^{OT}	3,511	12–18–3 (8–13–2)
March 8	6:00 pm	at St. Cloud State		Herb Brooks National Hockey Center • St. Cloud, Minnesota	Fox 9+	Gajan	W 3–2	5,018	13–18–3 (9–13–2)
NCHC Tournament
March 14	8:00 pm	at #12 Arizona State*		Mullett Arena • Tempe, Arizona (NCHC Quarterfinal Game 1)		Gajan	L 3–4	5,236	13–19–3
March 15	7:00 pm	at #12 Arizona State*		Mullett Arena • Tempe, Arizona (NCHC Quarterfinal Game 2)		Gajan	L 5–6 ^{OT}	5,182	13–20–3
*Non-conference game. ^{#}Rankings from USCHO.com Poll. All times are in Central Time. Source:

== Scoring statistics ==
Name	Position	Games	Goals	Assists	Points	PIM
Dominic James	C/LW	35	14	16	30	20
Max Plante	C	23	9	19	28	16
Jayson Shaugabay	C	36	12	14	26	4
Aaron Pionk	D	36	3	23	26	12
Zam Plante	C	33	7	13	20	0
Anthony Menghini	F	35	12	7	19	15
Owen Gallatin	D	36	4	11	15	15
Ty Hanson	D	36	4	11	15	15
Aiden Dubinsky	D	36	4	10	14	20
Callum Arnott	C/RW	36	6	4	10	2
Blake Bechen	F	34	5	4	9	12
Jack Smith	C/RW	33	4	5	9	23
Harper Bentz	RW	27	2	7	9	4
Carter Loney	C	33	3	5	8	40
Joey Molenaar	F	31	3	3	6	6
Kyle Bettens	C/RW	32	1	5	6	12
Braden Fischer	LW	20	2	3	5	8
Adam Kleber	D	33	2	3	5	13
Matthew Perkins	C	29	1	4	5	14
Joseph Pierce	D	36	1	4	5	50
Luke Bast	D	15	0	1	1	2
Trevor Stachowiak	F	2	0	0	0	0
Zach Sandy	G	4	0	0	0	0
William Francis	D	5	0	0	0	5
Riley Bodnarchuk	D	13	0	0	0	6
Klayton Knapp	G	16	0	0	0	0
Adam Gajan	G	21	0	0	0	0
Bench	–	–	–	–	–	0
Total			99	172	271	313

== Goaltending statistics ==
Name	Games	Minutes	Wins	Losses	Ties	Goals against	Saves	Shut outs	SV %	GAA
Klayton Knapp	16	853:20	6	6	2	38	370	1	.907	2.67
Adam Gajan	21	1153:36	7	12	1	64	491	1	.885	3.33
Zach Sandy	4	175:40	0	2	0	10	61	0	.859	3.42
Empty Net	-	19:21	-	-	-	5	-	-	-	-
Total	36	2200:57	13	20	3	117	922	2	.887	3.19

== Rankings ==
Poll	Week																											
Poll	Pre	1	2	3	4	5	6	7	8	9	10	11	12	13	14	15	16	17	18	19	20	21	22	23	24	25	26	27 (Final)
USCHO.com	18	NR	NR	NR	NR	NR	NR	NR	NR	NR	NR	NR	–	NR	NR	NR	NR	NR	NR	NR	NR	NR	NR	NR	NR	NR	–	NR
USA Hockey	18	NR	NR	NR	NR	NR	NR	NR	NR	NR	NR	NR	–	NR	NR	NR	NR	NR	NR	NR	NR	NR	NR	NR	NR	NR	NR	NR

Note: USCHO did not release a poll in week 12 or 26.
Note: USA Hockey did not release a poll in week 12.

== Awards and honors ==
Player	Award	Ref
Joe Molenaar	NCHC Sportsmanship Award	
Max Plante	NCHC All-Rookie Team	
