= Battle for Pikes Peak =

College ice hockey series

Air Force–Colorado College men's ice hockey rivalry
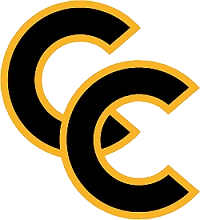
- Air Force Colorado College
- Sport: Men's Ice Hockey
- First meeting: December 5, 1969; Colorado College 5, Air Force 1
- Latest meeting: October 29, 2022; Air Force 6, Colorado College 3
- Trophy: Pikes Peak Trophy

Statistics
- Total meetings: 82
- All-time series: Colorado College leads 65–15-2
- Largest victory: Colorado College, 15–1 (1973)
- Longest win streak: Colorado College, 25 (1989–2008)
- Longest unbeaten streak: Colorado College, 30 (1986—2008)
- Current win streak: Colorado College, 3 (2018–present)

The Battle for Pikes Peak is a college ice hockey rivalry series that is played between the Colorado College Tigers and the Air Force Falcons.

== Background ==
The two schools have played each other since the Air Force Academy introduced ice hockey to its sporting schedule in the 1968–69 season. Colorado College started its hockey program thirty years before in 1938 and had been the lone top tier college hockey team till the University of Denver added ice hockey in 1949. The rivalry between Colorado College and the University of Denver, commonly called the Battle for the Gold Pan, has had a far more reaching intensity and history. However, unlike CC and DU, which are 65 miles from each other, CC and the Air Force Academy are only 11 miles apart, with CC within the Colorado Springs city limits and the AFA adjacent to the city limits (with a very small portion within the city). In 2013, Colorado College and Air Force established the Pikes Peak Trophy in memory of former CC and Falcons head coach John Matchefts. Matchefts had compiled a record of 54-88-3 in five seasons (1966–71) at the Colorado College helm before posting a ledger of 154-150-6 in 11 years (1974–85) with Air Force.

The rules to the series are very similar to that of the more widely known Battle for the Gold Pan. There are however many distinct differences. Unlike the four games per year between CC and DU, Air Force and CC have traditionally played only two games per year (between 2011 and 2014 only one game was played), this is mostly done in part as Air Force and CC have never been in the same conference. Air Force is currently part of Atlantic Hockey America, while Colorado College is a founding member of both its former and current hockey leagues, respectively the Western Collegiate Hockey Association and National Collegiate Hockey Conference. Both play a home-and-home series on weekends, where both teams play on each other's home ice on back-to-back nights. As of the upcoming 2024–25 season, CC plays its home games at Ed Robson Arena, while Air Force's home ice is Cadet Ice Arena. Both arenas feature NHL-sized rinks, in contrast to CC's former home of Broadmoor World Arena, with a larger Olympic-sized rink. Before Robson Arena opened in 2021–22, the difference in rink size was again similar to that of the rivalry between CC and DU. The setup is that the winner of the series wins the Pikes Peak Trophy. If a tie is reached then the trophy is retained by the previous winner. In the 2016/17 season both schools faced off again for only one game in the regular season. In the 2019–20 season, the teams faced off twice in a season for the first time in four seasons.

== Overall rivalry record ==
The following table details the game results since the inaugural 1969 meeting.

Colorado College victories	Air Force victories	Tie games

No.	Date	Location	Winner	Score
1	December 5, 1969	USAFA	Colorado College	5–1
2	December 6, 1969	Colorado College	Colorado College	8–2
3	January 15, 1971	USAFA	Colorado College	8–6
4	January 16, 1971	Colorado College	Tie	7–7
5	February 12, 1971	USAFA	Air Force	7–4
6	February 13, 1971	Colorado College	Colorado College	8–5
7	January 19, 1972	Colorado College	Colorado College	12–4
8	February 16, 1972	Colorado Springs	Colorado College	11–3
9	March 5, 1972	USAFA	Air Force	10–5
10	December 8, 1972	USAFA	Colorado College	6–3
11	December 9, 1972	USAFA	Colorado College	6–4
12	January 24, 1973	Colorado College	Colorado College	14–4
13	February 21, 1973	Colorado College	Colorado College	9–6
14	November 3, 1973	USAFA	Colorado College	15–1
15	December 1, 1973	Colorado College	Colorado College	6–4
16	January 15, 1975	Colorado College	Air Force	1–0
17	February 19, 1975	USAFA	Air Force	7–6^{OT}
18	February 11, 1977	Colorado College	Colorado College	7–2
19	February 13, 1977	USAFA	Colorado College	5–4
20	December 9, 1977	Colorado College	Colorado College	7–5
21	December 10, 1977	USAFA	Colorado College	6–5
22	December 5, 1978	USAFA	Air Force	6–1
23	February 6, 1979	Colorado College	Colorado College	8–2
24	December 11, 1979	USAFA	Colorado College	7–4
25	February 5, 1980	Colorado College	Colorado College	3–2
26	November 21, 1980	USAFA	Colorado College	6–2
27	November 22, 1980	Colorado College	Colorado College	6–1
28	December 1, 1981	USAFA	Colorado College	4–2
29	January 12, 1982	Colorado College	Colorado College	10–4
30	December 14, 1983	Colorado College	Colorado College	7–6
31	November 16, 1984	USAFA	Colorado College	13–4
32	November 17, 1984	Colorado College	Colorado College	6–3
33	November 8, 1985	USAFA	Colorado College	8–3
34	November 9, 1985	Colorado College	Air Force	6–5^{OT}
35	November 14, 1986	Colorado College	Colorado College	8–3
36	November 15, 1986	USAFA	Colorado College	7–6
37	November 13, 1987	Colorado College	Colorado College	5–1
38	November 28, 1988	USAFA	Colorado College	5–2
39	November 10, 1989	USAFA	Tie	3–3
40	November 11, 1989	Colorado College	Colorado College	7–1
41	January 22, 1991	Colorado College	Colorado College	3–1
42	January 29, 1991	USAFA	Colorado College	4–3

No.	Date	Location	Winner	Score
43	December 10, 1991	Colorado College	Colorado College	4–1
44	January 10, 1992	USAFA	Colorado College	4–2
45	November 11, 1992	Colorado College	Colorado College	12–3
46	February 23, 1993	USAFA	Colorado College	6–2
47	November 12, 1993	USAFA	Colorado College	9–1
48	November 23, 1993	Colorado College	Colorado College	5–1
49	November 25, 1994	USAFA	Colorado College	4–2
50	November 26, 1994	USAFA	Colorado College	10–1
51	December 5, 1995	USAFA	Colorado College	4–2
52	January 7, 1997	USAFA	Colorado College	3–2^{OT}
53	January 6, 1998	USAFA	Colorado College	2–1
54	February 24, 1998	Colorado College	Colorado College	6–2
55	November 27, 1998	Colorado College	Colorado College	8–2
56	January 28, 2000	Colorado College	Colorado College	10–0
57	December 1, 2000	Colorado College	Colorado College	4–1
58	January 25, 2002	Colorado College	Colorado College	8–1
59	November 29, 2002	USAFA	Colorado College	7–0
60	November 28, 2003	Colorado College	Colorado College	4–2
61	October 22, 2004	USAFA	Colorado College	4–1
62	October 22, 2005	Colorado College	Colorado College	6–3
63	October 6, 2006	Colorado College	Colorado College	2–1
64	January 19, 2008	Colorado College	Colorado College	2–1
65	November 28, 2008	USAFA	Air Force	4–1
66	February 5, 2010	Colorado Springs	Colorado College	2–0
67	November 12, 2010	USAFA	Colorado College	6–4
68	December 30, 2011	Colorado College	Air Force	2–1
69	October 19, 2012	USAFA	Colorado College	6–2
70	November 19, 2013	Colorado College	Air Force	3–1
71	November 22, 2014	USAFA	Air Force	3–1
72	November 27, 2015	USAFA	Air Force	4–3
73	November 28, 2015	Colorado College	Colorado College	4–3
74	November 26, 2016	Colorado College	Air Force	6–3
75	December 29, 2017	USAFA	Air Force	6–3
76	October 13, 2018	Colorado Springs	Colorado College	6–1
77	February 14, 2020	Colorado Springs	Colorado College	6–2
78	February 17, 2020	USAFA	Colorado College	4–2
79	October 29, 2021	USAFA	Air Force	5–4
80	October 30, 2021	Colorado Springs	Colorado College	8–1
81	October 28, 2022	Colorado Springs	Colorado College	8–0
82	October 29, 2022	USAFA	Air Force	6–3
Series: Colorado College leads 65–15–2

=== Goal count ===
Team	Total goals
Air Force goals	219
CC goals	429
Total goals	639

Updated as of November 26, 2016

=== Head-to-head tally ===
Type	Leader	Leaders W – L – T	Total matches
Air Force home games	CC	32 – 5 – 1	38 matches total
CC home games	CC	27 – 7 – 1	35 matches total
Overtime games	USAFA	2 – 1 – 1	4 matches total

- As of November 2016

== See also ==
- Battle for the Gold Pan
