= Adam Gajan =

Canadian ice hockey player (born 2004)

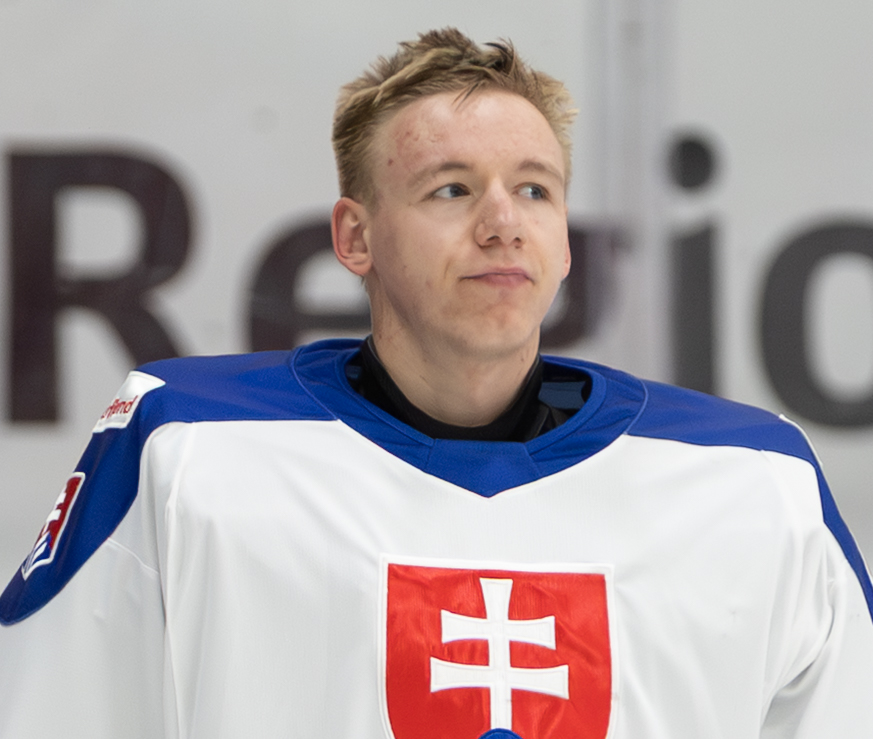
- Gajan in 2026
- Born: 24 May 2004 (age 22) Poprad, Slovakia
- Height: 6 ft 3 in (191 cm)
- Weight: 167 lb (76 kg; 11 st 13 lb)
- Position: Goaltender
- Shoots: Left
- NHL team (P) Cur. team: Chicago Blackhawks; Indy Fuel (ECHL)
- National team: Slovakia
- NHL draft: 35th overall, 2023; Chicago Blackhawks
- Playing career: 2018–present

Adam Gajan (born 24 May 2004) is a Slovak ice hockey player who is a goaltender for the Indy Fuel of the ECHL as a prospect to the Chicago Blackhawks of the National Hockey League (NHL).

== Playing career ==
=== Junior and college ===
Gajan started playing ice hockey in the youth categories in Slovakia, where he grew up in the hockey environment of the Poprad region. At a young age, he decided to go abroad to continue his sports development in higher-quality competitions. Gajan played in Sweden as a junior, playing in youth and junior competitions. The Swedish goalkeeping system is known for its emphasis on technique, movement in the goal area, and reading the game, which was also reflected in his performance.

Gajan then moved to North America, where he played for the Chippewa Steel of the North American Hockey League (NAHL) and Green Bay Gamblers of the United States Hockey League (USHL). The USHL is one of the most prestigious junior leagues in the United States and serves as the main preparatory competition for the NCAA and NHL drafts. Gajan became a stable goaltender for the team and regularly appeared in regular season games.

Gajan was selected 35th overall by the Chicago Blackhawks in the 2023 NHL entry draft. After the draft, he decided to continue his development path through college hockey.

Gajan plays in the NCAA for the Minnesota Duluth Bulldogs, representing the University of Minnesota Duluth, starting in the 2024-2025 season. Playing in the NCAA allows him to combine athletic development with college while retaining his NHL draft rights. In 2025, Gajan also appeared at the prestigious international Spengler Cup tournament, where he played as a goalkeeper for the US college team and gained valuable experience at the senior international level. After the 2025-26 NCAA season, Gajan signed a two-year entry contract worth (up to) $1.05M with the Chicago Blackhawks. Gajan will likely play with the Rockford IceHogs (the AHL affiliate of the Chicago Blackhawks) in 2026.

== International play ==
Gajan represented Slovakia in youth categories, and went through the national selections up to the under-20 category. During the junior seasons, he played in friendly matches and international tournaments, where he established himself as a stable goalkeeper for the national team.

Gajan achieved his most notable success at the 2023 World Junior Ice Hockey Championships, where he was one of the key players of the Slovak team. He faced a high number of shots in the matches and significantly contributed to the team's advancement to the medal race. The Slovak national team won bronze medals at the tournament, which represented one of the greatest successes of Slovak youth hockey. After the championship, Gajan was included in the All-Star team of the tournament, confirming his performances at the international level.

== Career statistics ==
Season	Team	League	GP	GAA	SV%	Record
2018-19	HPK U16 Team	U16 Suomi-sarja Q	6	6.00	.881%	N/A
2019-20	HK Poprad U16	Slovakia U16	17	2.35	.925%	N/A
2019-20	KH Poprad U18	Slovakia U18	2	2.42	.923%	N/A
2019-20	HC 46 Bardejov U18	Slovakia U18 2	2	4.80	.913%	N/A
2020-21	HK Skalica U20	Skalica U20	2	7.00	.851%	N/A
2020-21	HK Skalica	Slovakia2	1	10.12	.861%	N/A
2021-22	HK Skalica U18	Slovakia U18	11	1.81	.947%	N/A
2021-22	HK Skalica U20	Slovakia U20	38	3.60	.906%	N/A
2021-22 Playoffs	HK Skalica U20	Slovakia U20	5	3.21	.934%	N/A
2021-22	Team Slovakia U18	Slovakia2	2	10.12	.829%	N/A
2022-23	Chippewa Steel	NAHL	34	2.57	.917%	19-12-1
2022-23 Playoffs	Chippewa Steel	NAHL	3	2.85	.908%	0-2-1
2022-23	Green Bay Gamblers	USHL	6	2.48	.906%	5-1-0
2022-23	Slovakia U20	U20 World Juniors	4	2.40	.936%	2-2-0
2023-24	Green Bay Gamblers	USHL	43	3.35	.893%	23-12-4
2023-24 Playoffs	Green Bay Gamblers	USHL	5	2.86	.901%	2-2-1
2023-24	Slovakia U20	U20 World Juniors	4	2.50	.936%	2-2-0
2024-25	Minnesota-Duluth	NCAA(NCHC)	21	3.33	.885%	7-12-1
2025-26	Minnesota Duluth	NCAA(NCHC)	33	2.25	.908%	19-13-1

Stats via eliteprospects.com
