= Ty Gallagher =

American ice hockey player (born 2003)

- Born: March 6, 2003 (age 23) Clarkston, Michigan, U.S.
- Height: 6 ft 0 in (183 cm)
- Weight: 196 lb (89 kg; 14 st 0 lb)
- Position: Defence
- Shoots: Right
- AHL team: Providence Bruins
- NHL draft: 217th overall, 2021; Boston Bruins
- Playing career: 2025–present

Ty Gallagher (born March 6, 2003) is an American professional ice hockey defenceman for the Providence Bruins of the American Hockey League (AHL). He previously played college ice hockey for Boston University and Colorado College in the National Collegiate Athletic Association (NCAA).

== Playing career ==
=== Collegiate career ===
==== Boston University ====
Gallagher was drafted by the Boston Bruins in the seventh round of the 2021 NHL entry draft. Gallagher was originally committed to play college ice hockey at Notre Dame, starting in the 2021–22 season. However, heading into the season, Notre Dame signed multiple graduate transfers, and asked Gallagher to defer his commitment to the 2022 season. After this, Gallagher reopened his recruitment and then committed to Boston University.

Gallagher had a success filled first season with the Terriers. In addition to the team success of winning the 2022 Beanpot, Gallagher would score five goals and 11 assists in 34 games with the Terriers. These efforts led him to being named on the 2022 Hockey East All-Rookie Team. Unfortunately, the Terriers would lose to UConn in the quarterfinal of the 2022 Hockey East tournament, and would miss the 2022 NCAA tournament.

With a full year of experience under his belt, Gallagher would step up into a larger role for the Terriers in the 2022–23 season, and registered three goals and 18 assists for 21 total points. The Terriers would also enjoy great team success, winning the 2023 Hockey East tournament, and earning the #5 seed in the 2023 tournament. Gallagher registered one assist during the Hockey East tournament. In the NCAA tournament, Gallagher was held scoreless, but the Terriers were able to make it all the way to the Frozen Four before losing to the Minnesota.

Unfortunately, the 2023–24 season was not a successful one for Gallagher personally. In 37 games, he only registered five assists. Although the Terriers had some heartbreaking losses throughout the season, losing in the 2024 Beanpot final in overtime to Northeastern, and getting routed 6–2 in the 2024 Hockey East tournament by rival Boston College in the tournament final, the Terriers would earn the #2 seed in the 2024 NCAA tournament, where they would once again make the 2024 Frozen Four before losing to Denver.

On April 16, 2024, with one season of eligibility remaining, Gallagher entered the transfer portal.

==== Colorado College ====
On April 24, 2024, Gallagher transferred to play his final collegiate season with Colorado College, leading him back to a team that had originally pursued him following his decommitment from Notre Dame.

After a down year, Gallagher bounced back greatly with the Tigers, achieving career highs with nine goals and 27 points. Unfortunately, this did not translate into team success, as the Tigers finished the season a middling 18–18–1, and lost to Denver in three games in the first round of the 2025 NCHC Tournament. Gallagher would score three goals in three games in the tournament, including the only two goals for the Tigers in a devastating 9-2 Game 3 loss that would mark the end of Gallagher's college career.

=== Professional ===
With his college career finished, on March 19, 2025, Gallagher signed an amateur tryout (ATO) with the Providence Bruins to finish out the 2024–25 season.

Gallagher would score a goal and four assists in 11 games with the Bruins, but would be held scoreless in seven playoff games before the Bruins were eliminated by the Charlotte Checkers.

Gallagher started the 2025–26 season with Providence, although he was sent down to the team's ECHL affiliate, the Maine Mariners, after one game. After scoring a goal and two assists in four games, Gallagher returned to Providence, where he would showcase some offensive talent. In 43 games with Providence, Gallagher score seven goals and 13 assists for 20 points. He would also score two assists in four playoff games before the Bruins were upset by the Springfield Thunderbirds in the first round of the Calder Cup playoffs.

== Career statistics ==
			Regular season					Playoffs
Season	Team	League	GP	G	A	Pts	PIM	GP	G	A	Pts	PIM
2021–22	Boston University	HE	34	5	11	16	35	—	—	—	—	—
2022–23	Boston University	HE	40	3	18	21	24	—	—	—	—	—
2023–24	Boston University	HE	37	0	5	5	14	—	—	—	—	—
2024–25	Colorado College	NCHC	37	9	17	26	12	—	—	—	—	—
2024–25	Providence Bruins	AHL	11	1	4	5	4	7	0	0	0	4
2025–26	Providence Bruins	AHL	43	7	13	20	26	4	0	2	2	6
2025–26	Maine Mariners	ECHL	4	1	2	3	0	—	—	—	—	—
AHL totals			54	8	17	25	30	11	0	2	2	10

== Awards and honors ==
Award	Year
College
All-Hockey East Rookie Team	2021–22
