= Battle for the Gold Pan =

Ice hockey rivalry

Colorado College–Denver men's ice hockey rivalry
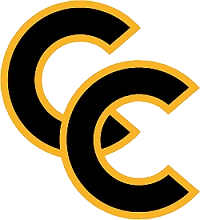
- Colorado College Denver
- Sport: Men's Ice Hockey
- First meeting: January 6, 1950; Colorado College 16, Denver 0
- Latest meeting: November 15, 2025; Denver 3, Colorado College 2
- Next meeting: February 6, 2026

Statistics
- Total meetings: 349
- All-time series: Denver leads 203-125–21
- Largest victory: Colorado College, 16–0 (1950)
- Longest win streak: Denver, 22 (1959–1963)
- Current win streak: Denver, 4 (2025–present)

The Battle for the Gold Pan (also called The DU/CC Rivalry, or known locally as The Gold Pan) is a series played between the Colorado College Tigers and the University of Denver Pioneers hockey teams. Denver currently holds the trophy after defeating Colorado College 4-3 on March 8, 2025 to retain the trophy.

The Gold Pan is among the top rivalries in American college ice hockey. With over 300 games played, both the Battle for the Gold Pan and Michigan and Michigan State rivalry have played the most games between schools in the NCAA, this includes the Green Line Rivalry, between Boston University and Boston College and the Border Battle, between Minnesota and Wisconsin.

== Background ==
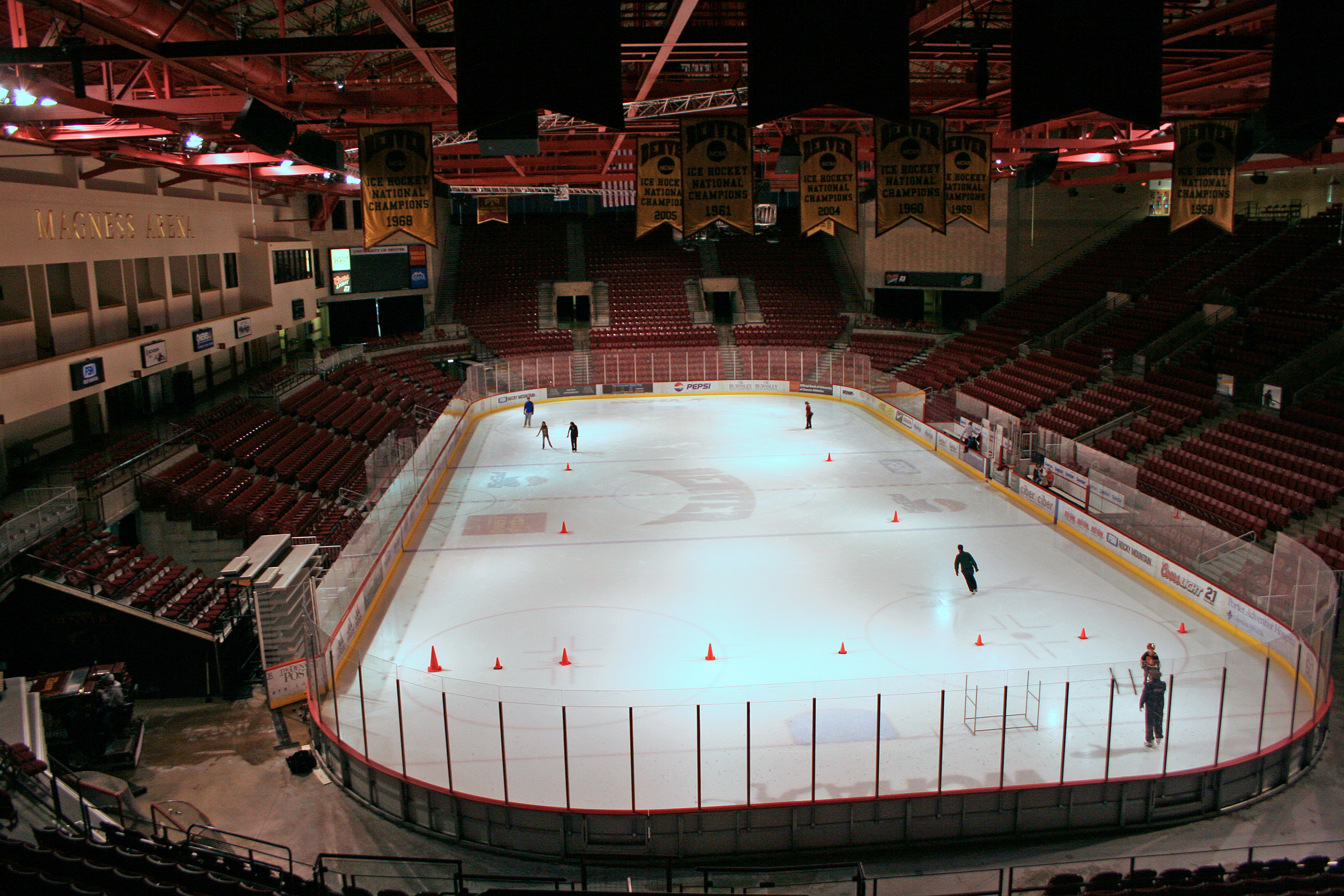
Magness Arena, home of the University of Denver Pioneers

Broadmoor World Arena, home of the Colorado College Tigers from 1998 to 2021

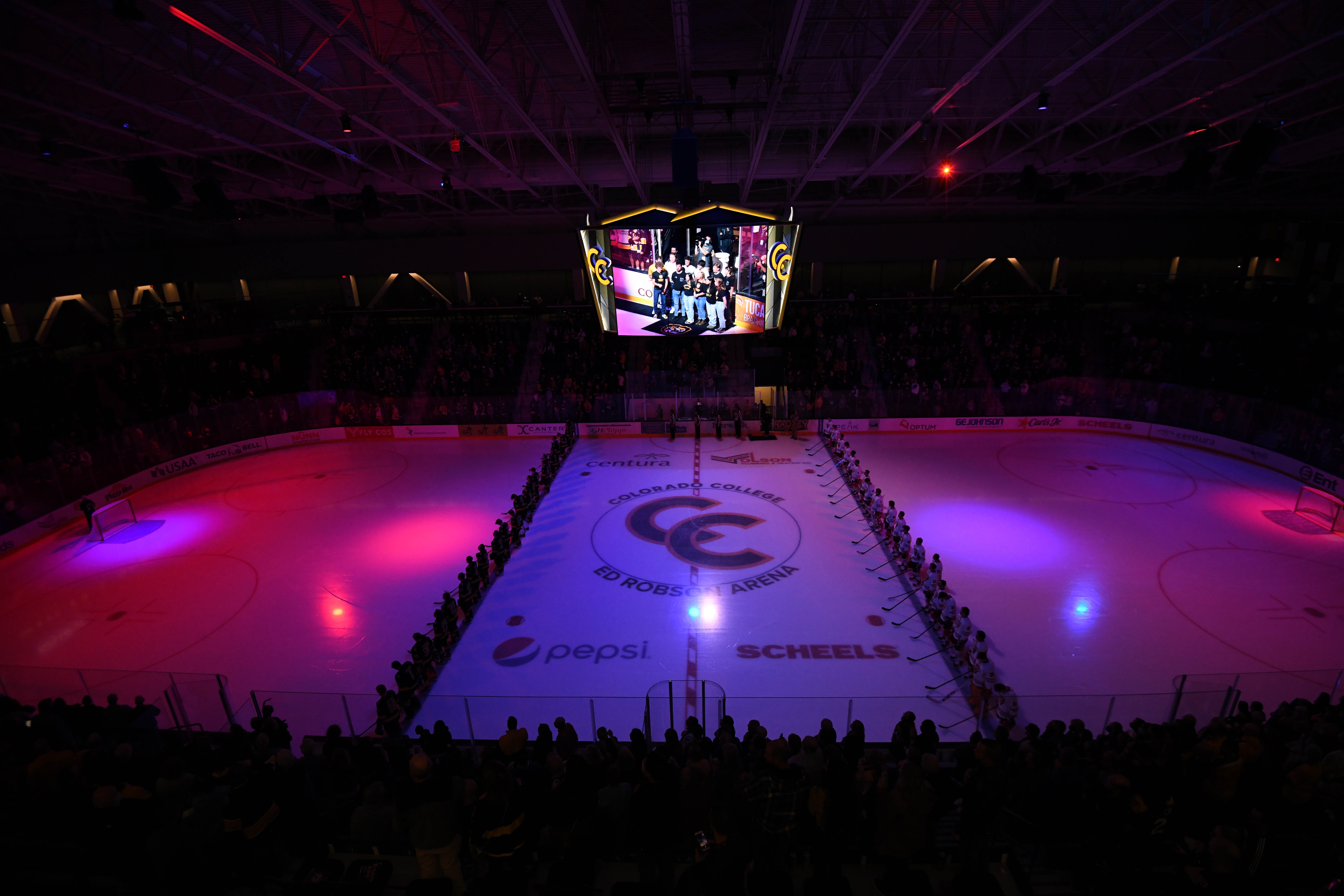
Ed Robson Arena on the campus of Colorado College, opened in 2021

The University of Denver and Colorado College hockey teams began playing one another in 1949–50, the first season for the University of Denver men's team. Colorado College has had a hockey program since 1938. The two schools were charter members of the Western Collegiate Hockey Association (WCHA), which was founded in 1951. The schools are also charter and current members of the National Collegiate Hockey Conference (NCHC), founded in 2011 with play starting in the 2013–14 season.

Both colleges are private schools with small student populations on Colorado's Front Range. Colorado College (enrollment near 2,000 students) is located in Colorado Springs, while the University of Denver (undergraduate enrollment near 6,000 students) is located in Denver. The two campuses are only 65 miles apart, right off of I-25. As of the 2022–23 season, home ice for the Colorado College Tigers is Ed Robson Arena, sitting at 6,060 feet above sea level, while the home ice for the Denver Pioneers is Magness Arena, at 5,370 feet, with both arenas featuring NHL-size rinks. Previously, CC had played at the Broadmoor World Arena, which has a larger, Olympic-size rink and sits at 6,250 feet. Nearly 300 NHL and other professional hockey players have passed through the hockey programs of the schools.

Both schools have produced Hobey Baker Award winners. Colorado College has had two Hobey Baker winners, Peter Sejna (2003) and Marty Sertich (2005). The University of Denver has had two Hobey Baker Award winners also, Matt Carle (2006) and Will Butcher (2017). Both Colorado College and the University of Denver have eight players who were finalists for the Hobey Baker Award since its inception in 1981; as of the end of the 2017/18 Season.

Plans for Robson Arena, estimated to cost $38 million, were first announced in 2018. The arena namesake is Colorado College 1954 alum and former CC Tiger hockey player Edward Robson. The new arena has a capacity of about 3,400, less than half that of The Broadmoor World Arena. The new arena also features an NHL-sized rink, removing a distinct difference between the schools' venues. Robson Arena will sit near 6,050 feet above sea level, roughly 200 feet below the Broadmoor World Arena. Colorado College planned to break ground for the new arena in 2018, initially hoping for it to be ready for play by 2020. Changes made during the planning process, most notably the addition of a parking garage and a shift in the arena footprint within its city block, led to delays. While demolition on the project began in 2018, groundbreaking for the new arena took place in 2020, with a planned opening for the 2021–22 season.

The Gold Pan format is as follows: Four games are played every regular season between Colorado College and the University of Denver, both schools playing two home games and two away games. The games are played on two separate weekends series in the regular season. One series is played near the beginning of the regular season, and the other series near the end of the regular season. The series are played in a Home & Home Series, where both teams play on their home ice once per series (unlike most college weekends series, which play at only one team's home ice). The team with the better record out of the four games is able to claim the Gold Pan, till next year. If a season series is tied, than the defender of the Gold Pan retains the coveted trophy for another year. With the NCHC ruling, if after an overtime period a game remains tied, both schools will continue to play in a tiebreaker until a winner is declared. A game that goes to a tiebreaker is still counted as a draw in the overall record and Gold Pan record, the tiebreaker is merely to see who is given a bonus point in NCHC standings. Post-season matches are not counted for the Gold Pan, but are counted overall in the rivalry.

== History ==
The two schools first met in January 1950 and have faced off against one another at least four times every year since then, as well as multiple playoff matches. There have been a few games postponed or even canceled due to violence between fans and players back between the 1960s thru the 1980s. Up until the 1990s, there was no formal series trophy for the season series, as the CC/DU games were merely for "bragging rights". In the 1993/94 season, then-DU coach Frank Serratore and CC coach Don Lucia decided to create a traveling trophy for the season series winner between the schools. That first Gold Pan trophy was a rusty old gold pan from Cripple Creek, Colorado that had actually been used for prospecting. That first trophy was lost in Denver after the 2003–2004 season. The current trophy was created by Colorado sculptor Mike Halterman and donated by the Cripple Creek & Victor Gold Mine in 2005.

In 2011 with the NCAA realignment of college hockey conferences, Colorado College and the University of Denver joined together to create the NCHC, bringing the rivalry with them. The first season in the NCHC (2013/14 season) led to the conference rule of a shootout if a game is tied after overtime. On November 8, 2013, CC and DU played the first ever regular season shootout in college hockey in Colorado Springs. CC and DU played to a 1–1 tie after overtime, DU would win in the shootout 2–0.

On February 20, 2016, the teams faced off for their first outdoor match, at Coors Field in Denver, billed as the "Battle on Blake" in reference to the location of Coors Field at the corner of Blake Street and 20th Street. Denver won the match 4–1 in front of 35,144 spectators.

== Game results ==
Colorado College victories	Denver victories	Tie games

No.	Date	Location	Winner	Score
1	January 6, 1950	Colorado Springs	Colorado College	16–0
2	January 7, 1950	Colorado Springs	Colorado College	10–0
3	January 21, 1950	Denver	Colorado College	14–1
4	January 30, 1950	Denver	Colorado College	10–3
5	December 8, 1950	Denver	Colorado College	11–8
6	December 9, 1950	Denver	Colorado College	7–5
7	January 12, 1951	Colorado Springs	Colorado College	10–3
8	January 13, 1951	Colorado Springs	Colorado College	8–4
9	December 1, 1951	Colorado Springs	Colorado College	7–6
10	December 7, 1951	Denver	Denver	4–3
11	December 8, 1951	Colorado Springs	Colorado College	7–3
12	January 11, 1952	Colorado Springs	Colorado College	5–0
13	January 12, 1952	Denver	Denver	5–4
14	January 16, 1953	Colorado Springs	Denver	11–4
15	January 17, 1953	Colorado Springs	Denver	4–2
16	February 6, 1953	Denver	Denver	4–3
17	February 7, 1953	Denver	Denver	8–3
18	December 19, 1953	Colorado Springs	Denver	7–5
19	January 15, 1954	Denver	Denver	5–4
20	January 16, 1954	Denver	Colorado College	6–5
21	February 27, 1954	Colorado Springs	Denver	6–2
22	January 14, 1955	Denver	Colorado College	3–1
23	January 15, 1955	Colorado Springs	Colorado College	6–4
24	February 18, 1955	Denver	Denver	3–2
25	February 19, 1955	Colorado Springs	Denver	4–3^{OT}
26	January 20, 1956	Denver	Colorado College	2–0
27	January 21, 1956	Colorado Springs	Colorado College	8–1
28	March 2, 1956	Denver	Denver	10–3
29	March 3, 1956	Colorado Springs	Denver	5–1
30	January 11, 1957	Denver	Denver	6–3
31	January 12, 1957	Colorado Springs	Colorado College	8–7^{OT}
32	February 15, 1957	Denver	Colorado College	6–4
33	February 16, 1957	Colorado Springs	Colorado College	4–3
34	December 13, 1957	Denver	Denver	6–4
35	December 14, 1957	Colorado Springs	Colorado College	6–2
36	January 13, 1958	Colorado Springs	Colorado College	10–4
37	January 14, 1958	Denver	Denver	3–2^{OT}
38	February 21, 1958	Colorado Springs	Colorado College	5–1
39	February 22, 1958	Denver	Denver	7–0
40	February 28, 1958	Denver	Denver	6–3
41	March 1, 1958	Colorado Springs	Colorado College	5–2
42	December 13, 1958	Colorado Springs	Denver	5–4
43	January 30, 1959	Denver	Denver	3–1
44	January 31, 1959	Colorado Springs	Colorado College	6–3
45	February 20, 1959	Denver	Denver	7–2
46	March 6, 1959	Denver	Denver	8–1
47	March 7, 1959	Colorado Springs	Denver	10–6
48	February 2, 1960	Denver	Denver	10–4
49	February 19, 1960	Denver	Denver	6–2
50	February 20, 1960	Colorado Springs	Denver	4–1
51	March 4, 1960	Denver	Denver	5–2
52	March 5, 1960	Colorado Springs	Denver	6–2
53	March 11, 1960†	Denver	Denver	9–2
54	March 12, 1960†	Denver	Denver	3–1
55	December 9, 1960	Denver	Denver	8–4
56	February 3, 1961	Denver	Denver	11–1
57	February 4, 1961	Colorado Springs	Denver	7–5
58	March 3, 1961	Denver	Denver	8–1
59	March 4, 1961	Colorado Springs	Denver	13–3
60	December 1, 1961	Denver	Denver	9–1
61	December 2, 1961	Colorado Springs	Denver	5–4
62	February 23, 1962	Denver	Denver	7–3
63	February 24, 1962	Colorado Springs	Denver	7–3
64	January 11, 1963	Denver	Denver	6–5
65	January 12, 1963	Colorado Springs	Denver	6–1
66	February 8, 1963	Denver	Denver	6–1
67	February 9, 1963	Colorado Springs	Colorado College	6–5
68	February 21, 1964	Denver	Denver	3–0
69	February 22, 1964	Colorado Springs	Denver	6–3
70	January 29, 1965	Colorado Springs	Colorado College	4–2
71	January 30, 1965	Denver	Denver	3–1
72	February 4, 1966	Denver	Denver	4–1
73	February 5, 1966	Colorado Springs	Denver	6–2
74	February 18, 1966	Denver	Tie	3–3
75	February 19, 1966	Colorado Springs	Denver	7–2
76	March 3, 1966†	Colorado Springs	Denver	8–2
77	March 7, 1967†	Denver	Denver	6–3
78	January 19, 1968	Denver	Denver	3–1
79	January 20, 1968	Colorado Springs	Denver	6–0
80	November 22, 1968	Denver	Denver	7–0
81	November 23, 1968	Colorado Springs	Denver	4–2
82	January 24, 1969	Denver	Denver	6–0
83	January 25, 1969	Colorado Springs	Denver	2–1
84	March 8, 1969†	Denver	Denver	3–1
85	November 22, 1969	Denver	Denver	7–4
86	February 6, 1970	Denver	Denver	5–2
87	February 7, 1970	Colorado Springs	Denver	8–7^{OT}
88	March 6, 1970	Denver	Denver	4–1

No.	Date	Location	Winner	Score
89	March 7, 1970	Colorado Springs	Colorado College	5–4
90	November 13, 1970	Denver	Denver	8–4
91	January 29, 1971	Denver	Denver	5–3
92	January 30, 1971	Colorado Springs	Denver	5–4
93	March 5, 1971	Denver	Denver	6–4
94	March 6, 1971	Colorado Springs	Denver	7–6
95	March 11, 1971†	Denver	Denver	6–3
96	November 13, 1971	Denver	Denver	4–3
97	February 11, 1972	Denver	Colorado College	9–7
98	February 12, 1972	Colorado Springs	Denver	13–4
99	February 25, 1972	Denver	Denver	13–2
100	February 26, 1972	Colorado Springs	Colorado College	9–6
101	February 1, 1973	Denver	Denver	7–2
102	February 3, 1973	Colorado Springs	Denver	7–5
103	February 15, 1973	Denver	Denver	8–3
104	February 17, 1973	Colorado Springs	Denver	3–1
105	November 2, 1973	Denver	Denver	6–4
106	November 3, 1973	Colorado Springs	Colorado College	2–1
107	March 1, 1974	Denver	Colorado College	7–4
108	March 2, 1974	Colorado Springs	Denver	7–1
109	December 13, 1974	Colorado Springs	Colorado College	6–2
110	December 14, 1974	Colorado Springs	Colorado College	5–3
111	February 28, 1975	Denver	Denver	5–4
112	March 1, 1975	Denver	Colorado College	8–4
113	December 5, 1975	Denver	Colorado College	2–1
114	December 6, 1975	Colorado Springs	Colorado College	7–3
115	March 5, 1976	Denver	Colorado College	7–5
116	March 6, 1976	Colorado Springs	Colorado College	5–3
117	December 10, 1976	Denver	Denver	6–3
118	December 11, 1976	Colorado Springs	Denver	5–4^{OT}
119	March 4, 1977	Denver	Denver	9–4
120	March 5, 1977	Colorado Springs	Colorado College	9–2
121	November 11, 1977	Denver	Denver	5–4
122	November 12, 1977	Colorado Springs	Denver	6–4
123	March 3, 1978	Colorado Springs	Denver	9–2
124	March 4, 1978	Denver	Denver	7–5
125	March 14, 1978†	Denver	Colorado College	6–3
126	March 15, 1978†	Denver	Denver	4–3
127	December 28, 1978	Colorado Springs	Denver	5–2
128	January 23, 1979	Colorado Springs	Colorado College	11–5
129	January 30, 1979	Denver	Colorado College	9–6
130	March 2, 1979	Denver	Colorado College	4–1
131	March 3, 1979	Colorado Springs	Denver	10–1
132	November 2, 1979	Denver	Colorado College	7–5
133	November 3, 1979	Colorado Springs	Colorado College	5–4^{OT}
134	February 29, 1980	Denver	Colorado College	4–2
135	March 1, 1980	Colorado Springs	Colorado College	10–2
136	November 7, 1980	Denver	Denver	3–1
137	November 8, 1980	Colorado Springs	Denver	6–3
138	December 12, 1980	Denver	Denver	7–3
139	December 13, 1980	Colorado Springs	Colorado College	5–2
140	November 6, 1981	Denver	Colorado College	6–5
141	November 7, 1981	Denver	Tie	7–7
142	December 11, 1981	Denver	Denver	11–5
143	December 12, 1981	Colorado Springs	Denver	9–8^{OT}
144	February 12, 1982	Denver	Colorado College	4–3
145	February 13, 1982	Colorado Springs	Tie	5–5
146	October 29, 1982	Denver	Denver	3–2^{OT}
147	October 30, 1982	Colorado Springs	Denver	7–5
148	January 28, 1983	Colorado Springs	Denver	8–3
149	January 29, 1983	Colorado Springs	Denver	8–7
150	February 18, 1983	Denver	Denver	11–3
151	February 19, 1983	Colorado Springs	Denver	10–4
152	October 28, 1983	Denver	Denver	8–5
153	October 29, 1983	Colorado Springs	Colorado College	5–3
154	January 27, 1984	Denver	Colorado College	9–8^{OT}
155	January 28, 1984	Colorado Springs	Denver	8–6
156	February 17, 1984	Denver	Denver	4–1
157	February 18, 1984	Colorado Springs	Denver	7–5
158	October 26, 1984	Denver	Denver	4–0
159	October 27, 1984	Colorado Springs	Colorado College	12–6
160	February 22, 1985	Denver	Denver	6–2
161	February 23, 1985	Colorado Springs	Denver	6–5^{OT}
162	October 11, 1985	Denver	Denver	7–2
163	October 25, 1985	Denver	Denver	5–1
164	October 26, 1985	Colorado Springs	Denver	6–4
165	February 21, 1986	Denver	Denver	7–6
166	February 22, 1986	Colorado Springs	Denver	4–2
167	October 24, 1986	Denver	Tie	3–3
168	October 25, 1986	Colorado Springs	Colorado College	4–1
169	February 20, 1987	Colorado Springs	Denver	6–2
170	February 21, 1987	Denver	Colorado College	10–2
171	February 27, 1987†	Denver	Colorado College	4–2
172	February 28, 1987†	Denver	Colorado College	3–2
173	October 23, 1987	Denver	Denver	5–4
174	October 24, 1987	Colorado Springs	Denver	4–2
175	February 19, 1988	Colorado Springs	Denver	11–4
176	February 20, 1988	Denver	Denver	5–3

No.	Date	Location	Winner	Score
177	November 4, 1988	Denver	Denver	8–7
178	November 5, 1988	Colorado Springs	Denver	7–4
179	February 17, 1989	Colorado Springs	Denver	5–2
180	February 18, 1989	Denver	Denver	5–4^{OT}
181	October 20, 1989	Colorado Springs	Colorado College	6–2
182	October 21, 1989	Denver	Denver	8–3
183	February 23, 1990	Denver	Colorado College	5–4^{OT}
184	February 24, 1990	Colorado Springs	Denver	5–4
185	October 26, 1990	Denver	Colorado College	7–1
186	October 27, 1990	Colorado Springs	Denver	5–2
187	February 15, 1991	Colorado Springs	Colorado College	6–4
188	February 16, 1991	Denver	Colorado College	5–4
189	November 1, 1991	Colorado Springs	Colorado College	6–3
190	November 3, 1991	Denver	Denver	2–0
191	March 6, 1992	Denver	Tie	3–3
192	March 7, 1992	Colorado Springs	Colorado College	5–2
193	November 6, 1992	Colorado Springs	Colorado College	8–4
194	November 7, 1992	Denver	Denver	6–3
195	March 5, 1993	Colorado Springs	Denver	4–2
196	March 6, 1993	Denver	Denver	8–2
197	January 7, 1994	Colorado Springs	Colorado College	6–5
198	January 8, 1994	Denver	Denver	5–4
199	March 4, 1994	Denver	Colorado College	4–3^{OT}
200	March 5, 1994	Colorado Springs	Tie	5–5
201	November 11, 1994	Denver	Denver	6–5
202	November 13, 1994	Colorado Springs	Colorado College	7–3
203	March 3, 1995	Colorado Springs	Tie	5–5
204	March 4, 1995	Denver	Denver	7–3
205	December 28, 1995	Denver	Denver	7–3
206	January 12, 1996	Denver	Denver	4–3
207	January 14, 1996	Colorado Springs	Colorado College	7–4
208	February 2, 1996	Colorado Springs	Colorado College	5–4
209	February 3, 1996	Denver	Colorado College	6–0
210	November 8, 1996	Denver	Colorado College	6–2
211	November 10, 1996	Colorado Springs	Colorado College	3–2
212	February 14, 1997	Colorado Springs	Colorado College	4–3
213	February 15, 1997	Denver	Denver	6–1
214	March 13, 1997†	St. Paul, MN	Colorado College	5–2
215	December 7, 1997	Colorado Springs	Colorado College	9–1
216	December 8, 1997	Denver	Denver	6–0
217	December 28, 1997	Denver	Colorado College	6–1
218	February 6, 1998	Colorado Springs	Tie	6–6
219	February 7, 1998	Denver	Denver	4–2
220	March 13, 1998†	Colorado Springs	Colorado College	3–2^{OT}
221	March 14, 1998†	Colorado Springs	Colorado College	6–4
222	November 13, 1998	Colorado Springs	Colorado College	6–4
223	November 14, 1998	Denver	Denver	6–0
224	February 19, 1999	Colorado Springs	Colorado College	5–2
225	February 20, 1999	USAFA, CO	Denver	4–3^{OT}
226	March 19, 1999†	St. Paul, MN	Denver	3–2^{OT}
227	November 19, 1999	Colorado Springs	Colorado College	4–2
228	November 20, 1999	Denver	Colorado College	4–1
229	January 21, 2000	Denver	Colorado College	2–0
230	January 22, 2000	Colorado	Colorado College	6–4
231	January 5, 2001	Denver	Colorado College	4–1
232	January 6, 2001	Colorado Springs	Colorado College	5–1
233	January 19, 2001	Denver	Colorado College	4–1
234	February 10, 2001	Colorado Springs	Denver	3–2
235	November 2, 2001	Colorado Springs	Denver	3–2^{OT}
236	November 3, 2001	Denver	Denver	3–2
237	February 1, 2002	Denver	Colorado College	3–2
238	February 2, 2002	Colorado Springs	Colorado College	4–2
239	March 15, 2002†	St. Paul, MN	Denver	3–0
240	December 6, 2002	Denver	Colorado College	4–3
241	December 7, 2002	Colorado Springs	Colorado College	6–2
242	March 6, 2003	Colorado Springs	Colorado College	2–0
243	March 7, 2003	Denver	Colorado College	4–2
244	November 7, 2003	Colorado Springs	Denver	5–2
245	November 8, 2003	Denver	Colorado College	4–1
246	March 4, 2004	Colorado Springs	Denver	3–1
247	March 5, 2004	Denver	Denver	3–2
248	March 12, 2004†	Denver	Colorado College	4–3
249	March 13, 2004†	Denver	Colorado College	6–1
250	November 12, 2004	Colorado Springs	Colorado College	3–1
251	November 13, 2004	Denver	Denver	6–3
252	March 3, 2005	Colorado Springs	Colorado College	3–0
253	March 4, 2005	Denver	Denver	5–0
254	March 19, 2005†	St. Paul, MN	Denver	1–0
255	April 7, 2005^	Columbus, OH	Denver	6–2
256	December 2, 2005	Colorado Springs	Denver	4–2
257	December 3, 2005	Denver	Denver	5–1
258	March 2, 2006	Colorado Springs	Denver	5–4^{OT}
259	March 3, 2006	Denver	Tie	3–3
260	December 1, 2006	Colorado Springs	Colorado College	5–1
261	December 2, 2006	Denver	Colorado College	3–2
262	March 2, 2007	Denver	Colorado College	3–0
263	March 3, 2007	Colorado Springs	Tie	5–5
264	November 23, 2007	Colorado Springs	Colorado College	5–1

No.	Date	Location	Winner	Score
265	November 24, 2007	Denver	Denver	3–2
266	March 7, 2008	Denver	Colorado College	5–2
267	March 8, 2008	Colorado Springs	Colorado College	3–1
268	October 31, 2008	Denver	Tie	2–2
269	November 2, 2008	Colorado Springs	Colorado College	3–2
270	February 13, 2009	Colorado Springs	Tie	3–3
271	March 7, 2009	Denver	Tie	1–1
272	December 4, 2009	Colorado Springs	Denver	2–1
273	December 5, 2009	Denver	Tie	4–4
274	March 5, 2010	Denver	Colorado College	2–1
275	March 6, 2010	Colorado Springs	Denver	7–3
276	November 5, 2010	Denver	Denver	4–1
277	November 6, 2010	Colorado Springs	Colorado College	9–2
278	February 4, 2011	Colorado Springs	Colorado College	3–2
279	February 5, 2011	Denver	Denver	5–3
280	November 12, 2011	Denver	Denver	5–4
281	December 2, 2011	Colorado Springs	Colorado College	4–3^{OT}
282	February 3, 2012	Denver	Colorado College	2–0
283	February 4, 2012	Colorado Springs	Tie	2–2
284	November 16, 2012	Colorado Springs	Denver	6–5
285	November 17, 2012	Denver	Denver	6–2
286	February 8, 2013	Denver	Tie	1–1
287	February 9, 2013	Colorado Springs	Colorado College	6–5^{OT}
288	March 15, 2013†	Denver	Denver	5–3
289	March 16, 2013†	Denver	Colorado College	2–1
290	March 17, 2013†	Denver	Colorado College	4–3
291	November 8, 2013	Colorado Springs	Tie	1–1
292	November 9, 2013	Denver	Denver	2–1
293	February 21, 2014	Denver	Colorado College	3–2
294	February 22, 2014	Colorado Springs	Colorado College	3–1
295	November 14, 2014	Denver	Denver	8–1
296	February 6, 2015	Colorado Springs	Denver	3–0
297	February 20, 2015	Colorado Springs	Denver	6–4
298	February 21, 2015	Denver	Denver	6–3
299	November 6, 2015	Denver	Denver	5–3
300	November 7, 2015	Colorado Springs	Denver	3–1
301	February 18, 2016	Colorado Springs	Denver	4–1
302	February 20, 2016ø	Coors Field	Denver	4–1
303	December 2, 2016	Colorado Springs	Denver	3–1
304	December 3, 2016	Denver	Denver	3–1
305	February 10, 2017	Denver	Denver	2–1
306	February 11, 2017	Colorado Springs	Denver	5–1
307	March 10, 2017†	Denver	Denver	4–1
308	March 11, 2017†	Denver	Denver	4–0
309	December 8, 2017	Denver	Tie	4–4
310	December 9, 2017	Colorado Springs	Tie	1–1
311	February 16, 2018	Colorado Springs	Denver	5–1
312	February 17, 2018	Denver	Colorado College	1–0
313	March 9, 2018†	Denver	Colorado College	2–0
314	March 10, 2018†	Denver	Denver	4–1
315	March 11, 2018†	Denver	Denver	4–0
316	January 19, 2019	Denver	Tie	4–4
317	February 26, 2019	Colorado Springs	Denver	1–0
318	March 8, 2019	Denver	Colorado College	2–1
319	March 9, 2019	Colorado Springs	Colorado College	1–0
320	March 23, 2019†	Colorado Springs	Denver	6–1
321	December 13, 2019	Denver	Denver	3–0
322	December 14, 2019	Colorado Springs	Denver	3–1
323	March 6, 2020	Colorado Springs	Tie	2–2
324	March 7, 2020	Denver	Denver	5–1
325	January 1, 2021	Colorado Springs	Colorado College	4–3
326	January 2, 2021	Denver	Denver	6–1
327	February 25, 2021	Colorado Springs	Denver	5–1
328	February 27, 2021	Denver	Denver	4–0
329	January 21, 2022	Denver	Denver	5–0
330	January 22, 2022	Colorado Springs	Denver	4–0
331	March 4, 2022	Colorado Springs	Denver	5–0
332	March 5, 2022	Denver	Denver	5–2
333	January 27, 2023	Denver	Denver	2–0
334	February 42, 2023	Colorado Springs	Denver	4–1
335	March 3, 2023	Denver	Denver	2–1
336	March 4, 2023	Colorado Springs	Denver	4–2
337	March 17, 2023†	Saint Paul	Colorado College	1–0
338	November 3, 2023	Denver	Denver	6–1
339	November 4, 2023	Colorado Springs	Denver	5–1
340	March 8, 2024	Colorado Springs	Colorado College	4–3
341	March 9, 2024	Denver	Denver	4–3
342	December 13, 2024	Colorado Springs	Colorado College	5–4
343	March 7, 2025	Denver	Denver	4–1
344	March 8, 2025	Colorado Springs	Denver	4–3
345	March 14, 2025†	Denver	Colorado College	3–1
346	March 15, 2025†	Denver	Denver	6–3
347	March 16, 2025†	Denver	Denver	9–2
348	November 14, 2025	Colorado Springs	Denver	2–1^{OT}
349	November 15, 2025	Denver	Denver	3–2
Series: Denver leads 203–125–21

- † – denotes Conference Playoff match
- ^ – denotes NCAA Playoff match
- ø – denotes Outdoor match

=== Goal Count ===
Team	Total Goals
DU Goals	1,511
CC Goals	1,238
TOTAL Goals	2,749

- UPDATED: November 16, 2025

=== Head-to-head tally ===
Type	Leader	Leaders W – L – T	Total Matches
DU Home Games	DU	118 – 53 – 10	181 Matches Total
CC Home Games	DU	80 – 71 – 9	160 Matches Total
Neutral Games	DU	6 – 2 – 0	8 Matches Total
Overtime Games	DU	13 – 8 – 19	40 Matches Total
Playoff Games	DU	20 – 15	35 Matches Total
Gold Pan Games	DU	56 - 49 - 14	117 Matches Total

- UPDATED: November 16, 2025

=== Decade Game tally ===
Decade	Leader	Leaders W – L – T	Total Matches
1950s	CC	24 – 23 – 0	47 Matches Total
1960s	DU	35 – 2 – 1	38 Matches Total
1970s	DU	29 – 19 – 0	48 Matches Total
1980s	DU	33 – 13 – 3	49 Matches Total
1990s	CC	25 – 17 — 4	46 Matches Total
2000s	CC	23 - 16 - 6	45 Matches Total
2010s	DU	29 - 14 - 6	49 Matches Total
2020s	DU	21 - 5 - 1	20 Matches Total

- UPDATED: November 16, 2025

== Team tallies (side by side) ==
- NCAA National Titles- DU:11 - CC:2
- National Title Appearances- DU:13 - CC:5
- Hobey Baker Award Winners- DU:2 - CC:2
- Alumni in NHL- DU:82 - CC:39
- Former Ice Hockey Olympians- DU:13 - CC:8
- WCHA MacNaughton Cup Regular Season Titles- DU:15 – CC:10 (Now Contested in CCHA)
- WCHA Broadmoor Trophy Playoff Titles- DU:15 – CC:1 (No Longer Contested)
- NCHC Penrose Memorial Cup Regular Season Titles-DU:3 – CC:0
- NCHC Frozen Faceoff Playoff Titles- DU: 3 – CC:0

UPDATED: End of 2023–24 season

== See also ==
- Battle for Pikes Peak
- College rivalry
- Beanpot (ice hockey)
- Green Line Rivalry
- Michigan–Michigan State ice hockey rivalry
