= Samu Salminen =

Finnish ice hockey player (born 2003)

- Born: 9 April 2003 (age 23) Helsinki, Finland
- Height: 6 ft 2 in (188 cm)
- Weight: 185 lb (84 kg; 13 st 3 lb)
- Position: Center/Left wing
- Shoots: Left
- NHL team (P) Cur. team: Florida Panthers; Charlotte Checkers (AHL)
- NHL draft: 68th overall, 2021; New Jersey Devils

Samu Salminen (born 9 April 2003) is a Finnish professional ice hockey player who is a forward for the Charlotte Checkers in the American Hockey League (AHL) while under contract to the Florida Panthers in the National Hockey League (NHL). He was drafted in the third round, 68th overall, by the New Jersey Devils in the 2021 NHL entry draft.

== Playing career ==
Salminen's youth hockey career was played in the Jokerit system. He made his U20 SM-sarja debut in the 2019–20 season at 16 years old, posting 20 points in 23 games. In December 2019, he broke his collarbone.

In the 2020–21 season, postponed until January 2021 due to the COVID-19 pandemic, Salminen was named alternate captain and improved his scoring to 26 points in 17 games. He had surgery on his collarbone shortly before the 2021 NHL entry draft, where he was selected in the third round, 68th overall by the New Jersey Devils.

As he was committed to the University of Denver, Salminen chose not to turn pro in the 2021–22 season. Although he considered accelerating his final year of school in Finland to join Denver immediately, or attending class remotely while playing in the United States Hockey League (USHL), the pandemic ultimately forced him to remain in the U20 SM-sarja for one more year. Promoted to captain, he scored 48 points in 44 games, the most on his team by a 10-point margin.

In August 2022, an admissions issue in Denver forced Salminen to change his commitment to the University of Connecticut. Following a related delay with his travel visa, Salminen finally made his NCAA debut on 27 October 2022, against Boston College. After a slow start that saw him score only two points in the first 10 games, his production skyrocketed, seeing him finish the season with 17 points in 27 games and playing on the team's top line. He and the Huskies were eliminated by UMass Lowell in the quarterfinals of the 2023 Hockey East tournament.

On 26 January 2024, Salminen scored a Michigan goal against Sacred Heart University. On 2 February, in a game against Providence College, Salminen received a five-minute major and a game misconduct for an illegal check to the head. He was later suspended for one game. After finishing the season third on the Huskies with seven goals and adding ten assists for seventeen points, it was announced that Salminen would be transferring to Denver.

== International play ==
Salminen has represented Finland at the under-16, under-17, under-18, and under-20 levels, although he never played in an under-20 tournament.

In his international tournament debut at the 2019 World U-17 Hockey Challenge, Salminen scored three goals and five points in five games.

Representing Finland at the 2021 IIHF World U18 Championships, Salminen scored seven goals and nine points in seven games.

== Personal life ==
Salminen has two hockey-playing older brothers, both now retired. Saku Salminen is a seventh-round draft pick of the Tampa Bay Lightning who most notably played in the SM-liiga, and Sami Salminen played for Northern Michigan University and professionally in the Mestis. Their father Pekka played minor professional in Finland before becoming a coach.

== Career statistics ==
=== Regular season and playoffs ===
			Regular season					Playoffs
Season	Team	League	GP	G	A	Pts	PIM	GP	G	A	Pts	PIM
2019–20	Jokerit	U20 SM-sarja	23	7	13	20	10	—	—	—	—	—
2021–22	Jokerit	U20 SM-sarja	17	10	16	26	10	2	0	0	0	0
2022–23	Jokerit	U20 SM-sarja	1	0	0	0	0	—	—	—	—	—
2022–23	UConn	HE	27	9	8	17	14	—	—	—	—	—
2023–24	UConn	HE	35	7	10	17	35	—	—	—	—	—
2024–25	University of Denver	NCHC	44	10	18	28	24	—	—	—	—	—
2025–26	University of Denver	NCHC	43	11	18	29	21	—	—	—	—	—
NCAA totals			149	37	54	91	94	—	—	—	—	—

=== International ===
Year	Team	Event	Result	GP	G	A	Pts	PIM
2019	Finland	U17	7th	5	3	2	5	6
2021	Finland	U18	4th	7	7	2	9	2
Junior totals				12	10	4	14	8

== Awards and honors ==
Award	Year	Ref
U20 SM-sarja
First All-Star Team	2022	
