= 2024–25 NCHC season =

- Season: 2024–25
- Conference: NCHC
- Division: Division I
- Sport: ice hockey
- Duration: October 4, 2024– March 8, 2025
- Number of teams: 9

NHL Entry Draft
- Top draft pick: Cullen Potter
- Picked by: Calgary Flames

Regular season
- Season champions: Western Michigan
- Season MVP: Zeev Buium
- Top scorer: Jack Devine (32)

NCHC Tournament
- Tournament champions: Western Michigan
- Runners-up: Denver
- Tournament MVP: Alex Bump
- Top scorer: Alex Bump (9)

NCAA Tournament
- Bids: 2
- Record: 6–1
- Best Finish: National Champion
- Team(s): Western Michigan

The 2024–25 NCHC season was the 12th season of play for the National Collegiate Hockey Conference and took place during the 2024–25 NCAA Division I men's ice hockey season. The regular season began on October 4, 2024, and concluded on March 8, 2025. The conference tournament began on March 14, 2025 and concluded on March 22, 2025.

This was the first NCHC season for Arizona State.

== Coaches ==
=== Records ===
Team	Head coach	Season at school	Record at school	NCHC record
Arizona State	Greg Powers	10 (Note: 10th season of NCAA coaching, 16th season overall. Powers was head coach of Arizona State during its last five seasons of club play in the ACHA (2010–2015).)	132–148–24 (Note: NCAA coaching record only.)	0–0–0
Colorado College	Kris Mayotte	4	43–59–9	26–40–6
Denver	David Carle	7	148–62–16	83–49–11
Miami	Anthony Noreen	1	0–0–0	0–0–0
Minnesota Duluth	Scott Sandelin	25	456–388–101	136–106–23
North Dakota	Brad Berry	10	206–104–33	127–70–20
Omaha	Mike Gabinet	8	117–114–16	74–82–12
St. Cloud State	Brett Larson	7	123–76–21	77–51–16
Western Michigan	Pat Ferschweiler	4	70–43–3	40–31–3

== Standings ==
2024–25 National Collegiate Hockey Conference Standings
	Conference record										Overall record					
	GP	W	L	T	OTW	OTL	SW	PTS	GF	GA	GP	W	L	T	GF	GA
#1 Western Michigan †*	24	19	4	1	4	3	0	57	98	51	42	34	7	1	167	86
#16 Arizona State	24	14	9	1	2	5	1	47	91	69	37	21	14	2	136	103
#3 Denver	24	15	8	1	2	1	0	45	89	59	44	31	12	1	174	94
Omaha	24	14	9	1	1	1	1	44	82	69	36	18	17	1	105	99
#18 North Dakota	24	14	9	1	3	1	1	42	81	73	38	21	15	2	120	111
Colorado College	24	11	12	1	4	1	1	32	68	72	37	18	18	1	106	113
Minnesota Duluth	24	9	13	2	2	2	1	30	63	77	36	13	20	3	99	117
St. Cloud State	24	7	16	1	2	3	0	23	53	79	36	14	21	1	79	110
Miami	24	0	23	1	0	3	0	4	38	114	34	3	28	3	63	143
Championship: March 22, 2025 † indicates conference regular season champion (Penrose Cup) * indicates conference tournament champion (Frozen Faceoff Championship Trophy); Rankings: USCHO.com Top 20 Poll

== Non-conference record ==
=== Regular season record ===
Team	AHA	Big Ten	CCHA	ECAC Hockey	Hockey East	Independent	Total
Arizona State	2–1–0	0–1–1	2–0–0	1–0–0	0–2–0	0–0–0	5–4–1
Colorado College	2–0–0	0–0–0	2–2–0	0–0–0	0–2–0	2–0–0	6–4–0
Denver	0–0–0	2–0–0	0–0–0	2–0–0	3–1–0	4–0–0	11–1–0
Miami	0–2–0	0–0–0	0–0–2	0–2–0	0–0–0	3–1–0	3–5–2
Minnesota Duluth	0–0–0	0–2–0	1–1–0	0–0–0	1–1–0	2–1–1	4–5–1
North Dakota	2–0–0	0–0–0	1–2–1	0–2–0	2–1–0	0–0–0	5–5–1
Omaha	1–0–0	1–0–0	0–4–0	0–0–0	1–1–0	1–1–0	4–6–0
St. Cloud State	0–0–0	1–1–0	6–0–0	0–0–0	0–2–0	0–0–0	7–3–0
Western Michigan	0–0–0	1–2–0	4–0–0	0–0–0	0–1–0	2–0–0	7–3–0
Overall	7–3–0	5–6–1	16–9–3	3–4–0	7–11–0	14–3–1	52–36–5

== Statistics ==
=== Leading Scorers ===
GP = Games played; G = Goals; A = Assists; Pts = Points; PIM = Penalties in minutes

Player	Class	Team	GP	G	A	Pts	PIM
Jack Devine	Senior	Denver	24	11	21	32	24
Artem Shlaine	Graduate	Arizona State	24	14	17	31	14
Alex Bump	Sophomore	Western Michigan	24	15	14	29	6
Lukas Sillinger	Graduate	Arizona State	22	7	22	29	8
Aidan Thompson	Junior	Denver	24	10	18	28	22
Sam Stange	Graduate	Omaha	24	12	16	28	18
Zeev Buium	Sophomore	Denver	23	8	20	28	30
Kyle Smolen	Sophomore	Arizona State	24	9	14	23	16
Brady Risk	Graduate	Omaha	24	11	11	22	18
Ryan Kirwan	Graduate	Arizona State	24	13	9	22	4
Grant Slukynsky	Sophomore	Western Michigan	24	6	16	22	2

=== Leading Goaltenders ===
Minimum 1/3 of team's minutes played in conference games.
GP = Games played; Min = Minutes played; W = Wins; L = Losses; T = Ties; GA = Goals against; SO = Shutouts; SV% = Save percentage; GAA = Goals against average

Player	Class	Team	GP	Min	W	L	T	GA	SO	SV%	GAA
Hampton Slukynsky	Freshman	Western Michigan	14	854:03	10	3	1	29	1	.915	2.04
Cameron Rowe	Graduate	Western Michigan	10	601:26	9	1	0	21	1	.925	2.10
Matt Davis	Senior	Denver	21	1215:21	14	6	1	49	0	.909	2.42
Isak Posch	Sophomore	St. Cloud State	11	642:36	6	5	0	26	0	.924	2.43
Luke Pavicich	Graduate	Arizona State	16	922:17	10	6	0	38	0	.913	2.47

== Conference Tournament ==
Teams are reseeded for the semifinals.

Quarterfinals; March 14–16
1	Western Michigan	6	6	-
8	St. Cloud State	2	2	-
2	Arizona State	4	6*	-
7	Minnesota Duluth	3	5	-
(Teams are reseeded after the quarterfinals)
3	Denver	1	6	9
6	Colorado College	3	3	2
4	Omaha	2	2	-
5	North Dakota	3	3	-

Semifinals; March 21
1	Western Michigan	4
5	North Dakota	2
2	Arizona State	2
3	Denver	4

Championship; March 22
1	Western Michigan	4**
3	Denver	3

Note: * denotes overtime period(s)

== NCAA tournament ==
=== Regional semifinals ===
==== Fargo ====
March 27, 2025; 4:00 pm	(1) Western Michigan	2–1 (2OT) (0–0, 1–0, 0–1, 0–0, 1–0)	(4) Minnesota State	Scheels Arena; Attendance: 4,817

Game reference

Hampton Slukynsky
Goalies
Alex Tracy
Referees:
Jim Curtin
Jeremy Tufts
Linesmen:
Kevin Briganti
Nick Briganti

(Michaels) Liam Valente (13) – PP – 20:48	1–0
	1–1	41:51 – Kaden Bohlsen (12) (Krajnik, Murr)
(Nehring, Valente) Grant Slukynsky (10) – GW – 87:14	2–1

2 min
Penalties
4 min
44
Shots
29

Game summary
The game started with a bang as both teams laid big hits on one another. The temperature cooled down a bit after the first minute but both squads skated up and down the ice as they looked for an early goal. During one such rush, WMU was able to turn the puck over in the Mavericks' end and, in reply, Jordan Power was called for tripping when he tried to prevent an open shot at his goal. Western had one of the best power plays in the country but MSU was able to match with a stelar kill. The few shots that made it through to Alex Tracy weren't too dangerous and Minnesota State was able to survive. The Mavericks turned defense to offense and immediately went on the attack. They were able to get a 3-on-2 but the Bronco defenders were able to limit them to a sharp-angle shot from the wall. Chances came fast and furious for both sides but both netminders looked to be on their respective games. A heavy hit by Campbell Cichosz on Owen Michaels in the corner looked to stun the Western forward but the Broncos were still able to tilt the ice towards the Mavericks' end in the middle of the period. Minnesota State was able to counter after WMU iced the puck but the Mavericks missed on a couple of passing plays and never ended up with a decent shot on goal. The fast and physical play continued and both benches called for penalties but the referees allowed play to continue. With about 6 minutes to go, MSU got on another odd-man rush but saw the opportunity go for naught when the play was blown dead for offsides. Minnesota State continued to let chances melt down and get low-percentage chances on goal but the continual puck possession in the WMU end prevented the Broncos from getting anything going in the later half of the period. The first real scoring opportunity came with two and half minutes left when Evan Murr launched an off-balance point shot that was deflected en route and just barely stopped by Hampton Slukynsky. Despite the up and down action, neither team took any real risks during the period until the waning seconds. Alex Bump was able to sneak past the MSU defense and streak in on Tracy. However, just as he was going to shoot, Adam Eisele slashed his stick and was called for a minor penalty. The first 16 seconds of the man-advantage did not produce any results with the rest being held over to the start of the second.

Western swiftly got the puck into the zone but had trouble getting through the MSU defense. After a blocked shot, the Mavericks collected the puck but failed to clear and the rubber bounced to Liam Valente. The Bronco forward then walked to the center of the right circle and beat Tracy high-glove for the opening goal. WMU continued to press after the goal and forced Minnesota State into a few turnovers but they were unable to capitalize. With Western taking over the balance of play MSU needed someone to change the momentum and that's exactly when they got when Brett Moravec went on a solo rush up the ice. After splitting to Bronco defenders, Moravec was slashed by Joona Väisänen to give the Mavericks their first power play of the match. Unfortunately for Minnesota State, their passing continued to be poor and Western ended up getting better chances. Even when the Mavs were able to set up a one-timer, Murr's stick snapped and the Broncso were able to clear. It was only at the very end of the man-advantage that MSU was able to generate a good scoring chance but a sprawling Slukynsky just managed to keep the puck out of the net. After the power play, the game reverted back to a back-and-forth match with both defenses preventing any good shots on goal. Around the mid point of the period, Western's offense began to exert itself once more but Tracy remained stout and kept the puck out of the net. MSU countered after a few minutes and Will Hillman was able to get a puck through Slukynsky but it bounded to the side of the goal. The Mavericks were able to apply some offensive pressure but, again, several opportunities went by the wayside thanks to inaccurate or deflected passes. With under 5 minutes to play, Brian Carrabes fired a shot from the point that just missed the far corner of the net past a screed Slukynsky. MSU kept the puck in the WMU end for much of the remaining time but continued to be plagued by bad passes. With just seconds left, Josh Groll skated into the slot and received a pass from behind the net. He launched a one-timer on goal but the shot was low and Slukynsky was able to make a leg save to keep the Mavericks off of the scoresheet.

After opening the period by icing the puck, Minnesota State was able to get its offense into gear and not only set up in the zone set up in the zone but finally get a good shot on goal. Slukynsky was able to stop the initial shot from Murr but the rebound from Zach Krajnik bounced up and was toward the goal off of a Bronco defender. As it was sliding towards the net, Kaden Bohlsen was the first one to reach the puck and he slammed it home to tie the match. End-to-end action persisted after the goal with both sides narrowly missing out on scoring chances. At around the 12-minute mark, Western appeared to commit a tripping penalty right in front of the Maverick net but neither referee made a call, much to the displeasure of Minnesota State. Fortunately for the Mavs, they were able to get control of the puck and push it back up the ice. With both teams not willing to take a risk and make a disastrous mistake, the game reverted to a tight-checking match but that didn't prevent the offenses from getting their chances. With about 9 minutes to play, MSU got on a late 2-on-1 but could not beat Slukynsky. Shortly afterwards, on a separate possession, Moravec attempted to lay a heavy hit on Bump but as the Bronco forward moved to avoid the check he caught a trailing leg and crashed to the ice. That play had the Western bench up in arms but the referees, perhaps as a makeup call, did not assess a penalty. Minnesota State continued to play physically, crashing into WMU players when the opportunities presented themselves and made use of the long leash provided by the refs. The final few minutes were played mostly in the Western end and Luigi Benincasa was nearly able to find the winning goal. With about 70 seconds left, The Maverick forward got a rebound right in front of the net and one-timed it towards the goal, the puck was rolling and he wasn't able to make good contact, causing the shot to just go off angle and bounce off of the far post. However, neither team could find the winning tally and overtime was needed.

Western Michigan went on the attack at the start of OT but MSU's defense didn't crack. The kept up their physical play and then countered but were unable to get the puck past Slukynsky. A few minutes into the period, MSU committed three consecutive icings. In order to give his players a breather, head coach Luke Strand used his timeout. On the ensuing faceoff, the Mavs got control of the puck and skated it up the ice to take the pressure off. Minnesota State then began to establish zone time and got several good looks on goal but Western's sturdy defense was able to block the puck away. Even though only a few shots got through, Slukynsky still had to stay on the top of his game and stop several high-percentage chances. The middle of the period was typified by tight defense with the refs allowing both teams to commit letter-of-the-law penalties without punishment. MSU was able to take advantage of this and tilt the puck towards the Western end but that didn't prevent the Broncos from having chances of their own. Off of a faceoff in the Maverick end, Bump wired a shot high on goal but Tracy blocked it with his shoulder. A little later the Purple goaltender was called upon again to stop Grant Slukynsky at the side of the net and kept the game going. With five and half left in the period, Western committed an icing. With the players already tired from a long shift, it was Pat Ferschweiler's turn to call a timeout. About a minute later, Bump was able to find a streaking Michaels who went in alone on the MSU net but Tracy was able to make a glove save on a low shot. Both defenses were instrumental in keeping the puck out of the net for the final three minutes as both teams continued to press. With just a few seconds left, Bump found a rebound in front of the Minnesota State crease but he had to rush the shot and Alex Trace telescoped out to made the save just before the end of the period.

Western again was the first to the attack at the beginning of the fifth period and almost was able to find the net just seconds into the session. MSU replied soon thereafter and had their own glorious chance halted by Slukynsky. A few minutes later, WMU coughed up the puck deep in their own end but Luc Wilson had the puck knocked off of his blade as he tried to stickhandle around the Bronco netminder. About a minute later, Western nearly found the net when Wyatt Schingoethe got the puck alone in front of the goal. Tracy made two toe saves before stopping Tim Washe on a third to save the team's season. With both teams growing increasingly fatigued, the hitting tailed off but MSU remained the more physical of the two. Nearing the middle of the period, Zach Nehring threw a weak shot on goal that Tracy was not able to collect. Grant Slukynsky backhanded the rebound which deflected off of Wilson into the net, ending the game.

==== Manchester ====
March 28, 2025; 5:30 pm	(2) Providence	1–5 (0–1, 0–2, 1–2)	(3) Denver	SNHU Arena; Attendance: 7,368

Game reference

Philip Svedebäck
Goalies
Matt Davis
Referees:
Andrew Bruggeman
David Marcotte
Linesmen:
Justin Cornell
Pat Richardson

	0–1	02:25 – Connor Caponi (5) (unassisted)
	0–2	23:17 – GW – Zeev Buium (12) (Thompson, King)
	0–3	26:01 – PP – Sam Harris (23) (Buium, King)
	0–4	43:53 – Aidan Thompson (20) (Buium, Salminen)
(Will) Austen May (1) – PP – 51:39	1–4
	1–5	55:09 – SH EN – Carter King (17) (unassisted)

18 min
Penalties
33 min
31
Shots
20

Game summary

=== Regional finals ===
==== Fargo ====
March 29, 2025; 5:30 pm	(1) Western Michigan	2–1 (0–1, 1–0, 1–0)	(3) Massachusetts	Scheels Arena; Attendance: 4,329

Game reference

Hampton Slukynsky
Goalies
Michael Hrabal
Referees:
Brady Johnson
Bobby Lukkason
Linesmen:
Nathan Voll
Tyler Landman

	0–1	8:50 – Dans Ločmelis (8) (Jenčko, Alger)
(Sjölund, Michaels) Liam Valente (14) – PP – 38:35	1–1
(Kramer, Väisänen) Tim Washe (16) – GW PP – 42:47	2–1

9 min
Penalties
17 min
30
Shots
29

Game summary

==== Manchester ====
March 30, 2025; 7:00 pm	(1) Boston College	1–3 (0–1, 1–1, 0–1)	(3) Denver	SNHU Arena; Attendance: 6,802

Game reference

Jacob Fowler
Goalies
Matt Davis
Referees:
Colin Kronforst
Jake Rekucki
Linesmen:
Jake Davis
Sam Shikowski

	0–1	18:19 – Eric Pohlkamp (11) (Devine, Thompson)
	0–2	22:59 – GW – James Reeder (11) (Buium, Salminen)
(Vote) Teddy Stiga (14) – 39:07	1–2
	1–3	59:56 – EN – Zeev Buium (13) (unassisted)

4 min
Penalties
2 min
36
Shots
25

Game summary

=== National semifinal ===
April 10, 2025; 4:00 pm	(F1) Western Michigan	3–2 (2OT) (0–0, 2–0, 0–2, 0–0, 1–0)	(M3) Denver	Enterprise Center; Attendance: 16,814

Game reference

Hampton Slukynsky
Goalies
Matt Davis
Referees:
Jeremy Tufts
Geoff Miller
Linesmen:
Kevin Briganti
Nick Briganti

(Washe) Brian Kramer (2) – PP – 26:16	1–0
(unassisted) Owen Michaels (15) – 34:32	2–0
	2–1	46:49 – Aidan Thompson (21) (Ashcroft, Brown)
	2–2	57:21 – Jared Wright (21) (Pohlkamp)
(Costantini, Väisänen) Owen Michaels (16) – GW – 80:26	3–2

4 min
Penalties
6 min
47
Shots
22

Game summary
Western started fast, causing a turnover in front of the benches and then attacking Denver's cage. After the puck was thrown behind the net, it bounce out the other side, forcing Matt Davis to make a tough save. He was unable to control the rebound and the puck hopped out into the open. Davis then slipped and was unable to regain the net. Zach Nehring had a wide open shot at the goal but the puck was on edge and his shot hit the crossbar and bounced away harmlessly. The pace cooled down afterwards as both teams appeared a bit nervous, particularly after the fireworks in the first minute. Only 2 shots were recorded in the first 5 minutes between the two clubs as the two NCHC rivals probed one another for weaknesses. The defenses on both sides was effective on the backcheck, melting down attacks by both sides and stopping any shots from getting on goal for several minutes. By the middle of the period, there were only 3 shots on goal in what was a tight-checking affair to that point. In the back half of the period the game began to open up and, within a minute, Kieran Cebrian was called for boarding to give Western Michigan the game's first power play. The Broncos were able to set up immediately and put pressure on the Denver goal but after a few saves from Davis, the Pioneers were able to clear the zone. After setting up a second time, Western was able to put the puck on goal several more times but Davis managed to stop all 5 shots on the power play. After killing off the penalty, Denver began to attack and were able to generate their first real scoring chance at about the 15-minute mark. Hampton Slukynsky was able to close his five-hole in time and send the Broncos up the ice on a counterattack. Western's shot was stopped by Davis but he was unable to find the puck. Fortunately for Denver, the rubber dropped straight down and when WMU took a shot at the loose puck it was easily stopped by Davis' left pad. During the ensuing play, there was a bit of a comical moment when several players got into a rugby scrum just inside the Denver blueline. With the puck pinned to the boards, the players locked their skated together stat stationary for several seconds. The referees yelled at them that they were not blowing the whistle and forced the two sides to sort the situation out for themselves. About a minute later, Alex Bump was able to get a hard one-timer on goal from the top of the circle but Davis made a spectacular glove save and kept the game scoreless. After a bit of back-and-forth, Eric Pohlkamp grabbed the puck and weaved his way through half a dozen skaters and fired a hard shot that Slukynsky stopped. The attempt came with just seconds to play in the period and was only Denver's third shot of the frame.

Western again got a jump on the puck at the start of the second. Bump's fourth shot of the game hit Davis in the mask, knocking it loose and drawing a whistle. Denver tried to get their offense going in response but the pressure by WMU at both ends of the ice prevented the Pioneers from holding the puck long enough to generate a scoring chance. After forcing a turnover in the Denver end, Western Michigan threatened Davis once more but Denver's was quickly able to recover. As the play continued, Bump was handed a slashing call to give Denver its first opportunity on the man-advantage. With the #3 power play in the nation, Denver had a glorious chance to get the game's opening goal, however, Western Michigan was no slouch on special teams with the #4 penalty kill. The Pioneers were able to spend most of the time in the WMU end but the Broncos were largely able to keep Denver to the outside. A little after the penalty expired, Samu Salminen took a rather poor holding penalty behind his own net and put Western back on the power play. Poor puck management cost Western Michigan the first 30 seconds of the power play but after Denver's clearing attempt went into the bench, Western got a reprieve and scored off the ensuing faceoff into the far corner. Brian Kramer, a graduate transfer, scored just his scored goal of the year from the high slot to give WMU the first lead of the match. Western did not let up after the goal and continued to press Denver all over the ice. Just before the middle of the period, the puck came to the front of the Denver cage and was stopped by Davis. The netminder was then pushed into the goal and Western began celebrating a second tally, however, the referees immediately ruled the play dead. Upon review, the call was upheld and the score remained 1–0. Western Michigan continued to besiege Davis and kept the Pioneers on their heels. After a few minutes, Denver was able to get a lucky bounce and get a couple of open looks no goal but Slukynsky was able to stop both Aidan Thompson and Jared Wright. A few minutes later, Zeev Buium was retrieving a puck behind his net with Wyatt Schingoethe hot on his heels. When Buium tried to avoid the check, Schingoethe's leg caught him in the ankle and caused the speedy defenseman to crumple to the ice. Buium was able to skate off under his own power but was definitely feeling the effects of the hit. Moments later, as Denver was trying to exit their zone, Bump laid his stick on Thompson, knocking him to the ice. While Denver was yelling for a penalty, the puck slid right to Owen Michaels. The sophomore skated in a few feet and launched a shot by Davis' ear right into the far corner for the second goal of the game. During the ensuing play, Tim Washe was sent in on Davis with a breakaway but the Denver goaltender kept his team in the match by making the save. After the following faceoff, Iiro Hakkarainen was called for hooking to give Denver's man-advantage a second opportunity. Despite good puck movement, Denver was not able to get a shot on goal. Instead, Matteo Costantini was able to turn the puck over at his own blueline and break in on Davis. The netminder was forced to make two massive saves on the Ontario native as well as another later from Washe and a further chance by Bump just as the penalty was expiring. Western ended up outshooting the Pioneers while on the penalty kill as a demonstration of just how in control of the game the Broncos were. Even when Denver was able to get a turnover late in the period, WMU's defense was able to quickly respond and stop the puck before it got to the net. At the end of 40 minutes, Western led with 32 shots to just 8 for Denver.

With Denver in a precarious position, the team altered their style of play by leaning more towards the offensive end. The Pioneers were able to generate a decent scoring chance in the first minute of the period, but they also opened up their zone for Western's offense. in the third minute, that resulted in the Broncos getting another chance on goal where Davis was unable to control the rebound but fortune remained with the Pioneer netminder and the puck remained between his legs. Denver's counter resulted in another shot on Slukynsky but no follow up. Just prior to the 5-minute mark, Hagen Burrows clipped Michaels in the helmet with his stick and gave Western a third power play. The Broncos did not have the same urgency as they had on their first two chances and Denver managed to kill off the penalty with relative ease. Shortly afterwards, Denver was able to get into the WMU zone with possession and move the puck around to Thompson in the right circle. His initial shot was blocked by Samuel Sjölund but the rebound came right back to Thompson and he sent a fluttering shot past an over-extended Slukynsky to cut the lead in half. The goal appeared to breathe life back into the Pioneers and Denver suddenly began to pressure Western. After a little more back-and-forth, Denver got into the WMU end past the midpoint of the period and got several good looks at the net but were unable to get the puck past Slukynsky. Denver continued to search and probe for the tying goal but the Bronco defenders continued to hold them off. As time kept ticking away on Denver's season, the Pioneers were constantly on the attack and, with less then 3 minutes to play, Pohlkamp fired a hard shot on goal from the top of the circle. Slukynsky made the initial save but the puck bounced out and dropped into the crease. In a melee of four skaters, Wright was able to poke the puck between Slukynsky's legs and tie the game. However, Western challenged for goaltender interference, believing that Slukynsky had been pushed just prior to the goal. After a review, the goal was allowed to stand much to the displeasure of the Broncos. With the game not tied, Western Michigan now had to rouse its offense that had taken off most of the third period. Denver remained on the attack, looking for the winning goal in regulation. Neither side was able to find the back of the net again and, for the third consecutive meeting, the two would need overtime to settle the account.

Denver took charge at the start of overtime but Western was able to prevent any good scoring chance from occurring. Through a combination of backchecking and shot-blocking, the Pioneers were unable to get a puck on goal for the first few minutes but were still directing the pace of play. As the period progressed, Western Michigan slowly took charge and began to tilt the ice back towards Davis. Denver continued to fight back but the Broncos were able to find Bump right in front of the net at the 8-minute mark but when he slapped at the loose puck it was fluttering in the air and went well wide of the half-open cage. A few minutes later, Denver was able to get a long shot on goal and force Slukynsky to save the rebound. The puck then was laying right in front of the goal but Western jumped on the puck and skated it out of danger. A short time later, Buium danced through the entire WMU defense but his shot was blocked by Cole Crusberg-Roseen. On the counterattack, Buium then deflected a shot from Michaels that nearly found its way into his own cage. About a minute later, Western nearly ended the game when Washe tried to find Hakkarainen in off to the side of the net. The puck was stopped by the skate of Rieger Lorenz but was then almost slid under a sprawling Davis before he managed to cover and freeze the puck. The pace picked up with both teams trying to end the match quickly but the two netminders were not accommodating. The two sides exchanged scoring chances for several minutes but could not get the puck into the net. With about 2 minutes to play, Buium was again involved in a collision where he attempted to avoid a check but was caught in the leg. Denver again screamed for a penalty but none was forthcoming. Western was able to get a 2-on-1 as a result but Davis made the save on Bump. In the end, 80 minutes was not enough and for the first time in 29 years, a Frozen Four game went into double overtime.

Western was able to get control of the puck at the start of the fifth period and, less than 30 seconds into the frame, Costantini found Michaels in the high slot for the winning goal.

=== National Championship ===
April 12, 2024; 6:30 pm	Western Michigan	6–2 (2–1, 1–1, 3–0)	Boston University	Enterprise Center; Attendance: 16,953

Game reference
Referees: Cameron Lynch; CJ Hanafin; Linesmen: John Rey; Patrick Dapuzzo

Scoring summary
Period	Team	Goal	Assist(s)	Time	Score
1st	WMU	Wyatt Schingoethe (5)	Hakkarainen, Washe	1:38	1–0 WMU
1st	BU	Cole Eiserman (25)	Kaplan, Bednarik	7:12	1–1
1st	WMU	Cole Crusberg-Roseen (3)	unassisted	15:01	2–1 WMU
2nd	WMU	Ty Henricks (8) – GW	Knuble, Szydlowski	25:18	3–1 WMU
2nd	BU	Shane Lachance (12) – PP	Greene, C. Hutson	30:42	3–2 WMU
3rd	WMU	Owen Michaels (17)	Väisänen	47:16	4–2 WMU
3rd	WMU	Iiro Hakkarainen (13)	Schingoethe, Washe	56:02	5–2 WMU
3rd	WMU	Owen Michaels (18) – EN		57:52	6–2 WMU
Penalty summary
Period	Team	Player	Penalty	Time	PIM
1st	BU	Quinn Hutson	Hooking	9:33	2:00
2nd	WMU	Brian Kramer	Holding	30:26	2:00
2nd	WMU	Ty Henricks	Slashing	35:40	2:00
2nd	BU	Devin Kaplan	Kneeing	38:14	2:00

Shots by period
Team	1	2	3	T
Western Michigan	9	9	10	28
Boston University	8	8	10	26

Goaltenders
Team	Name	Saves	Goals against	Time on ice
WMU	Hampton Slukynsky	24	2	59:26
BU	Mikhail Yegorov	22	5	58:21

Game summary

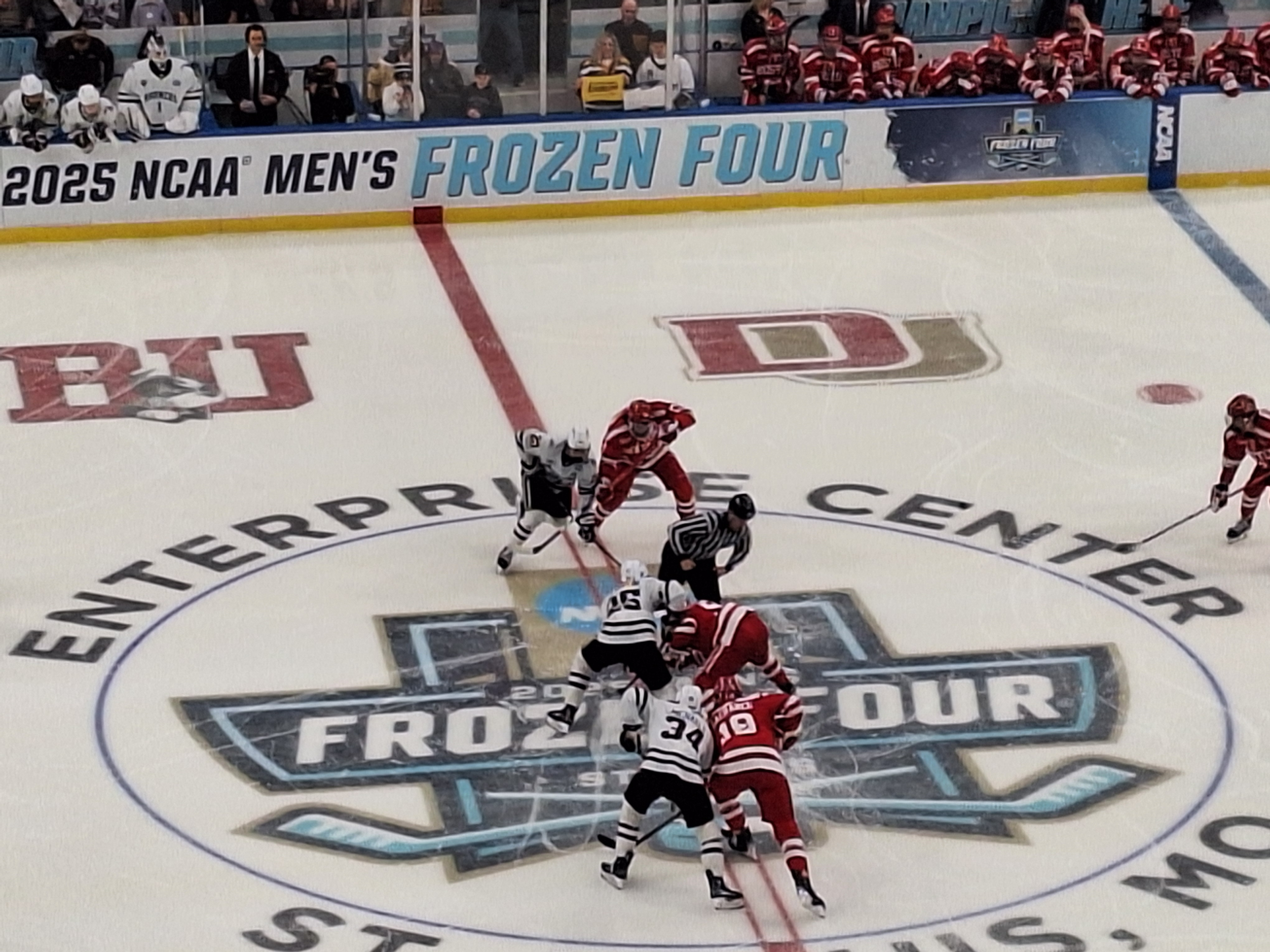
Opening face-off from the finals

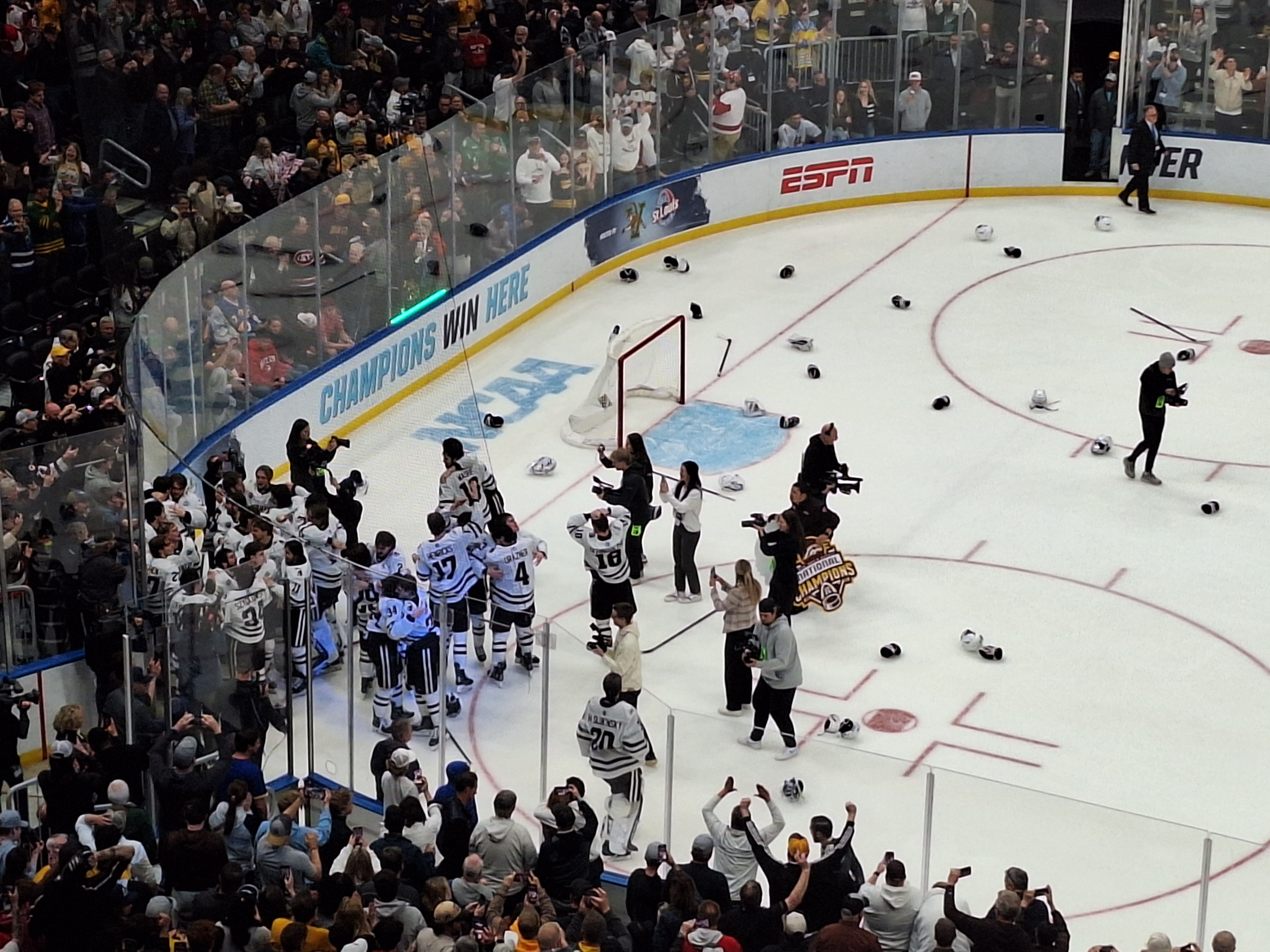
Post-game celebration

== Ranking ==
=== USCHO ===
Team	Pre	1	2	3	4	5	6	7	8	9	10	11	13	14	15	16	17	18	19	20	21	22	23	24	25	Final
Arizona State	20т	NR	NR	NR	NR	NR	NR	NR	19	19	19	19	19	16	13	11	12	12	10	12	12	12	12	11	15	16
Colorado College	11	12	11	9	8	8	8	7	8	8	10	8	8	13	18	19	NR	20	19	20	20	20	NR	NR	NR	NR
Denver	1	1	1	1	1	1	1	1	2	2	4	5	6	6	7	5	5	6	6	6	6	7	6	6	6	3
Miami	NR	NR	NR	NR	NR	NR	NR	NR	NR	NR	NR	NR	NR	NR	NR	NR	NR	NR	NR	NR	NR	NR	NR	NR	NR	NR
Minnesota Duluth	18	NR	NR	NR	NR	NR	NR	NR	NR	NR	NR	NR	NR	NR	NR	NR	NR	NR	NR	NR	NR	NR	NR	NR	NR	NR
North Dakota	5	6	5	7	6	10	9	12	14	16	16	15	14	14	14	16	16	16	17	17	18	18	17	17	18	18
Omaha	15	15	12	16	NR	NR	NR	NR	NR	NR	NR	NR	NR	NR	NR	NR	NR	NR	20	NR	NR	NR	20	NR	NR	NR
St. Cloud State	16	16	13	12	10	12	12	11	9	9	9	12	11	10	15	17	NR	NR	NR	NR	NR	NR	NR	NR	NR	NR
Western Michigan	17	17	17	14	13	14	13	9	7	7	6	6	4	4	4	3	3	4	3	3	4	4	3	3	3	1

=== USA Hockey ===
Team	Pre	1	2	3	4	5	6	7	8	9	10	11	13	14	15	16	17	18	19	20	21	22	23	24	25	26	Final
Arizona State	NR	NR	NR	NR	NR	NR	NR	NR	20	19	20	19	NR	15	13	11	13	12	11	12	13	13	13	12	15	16	16
Colorado College	12	12	11	9	9	8	8	8	8	8	11	11	8	14	19	19	NR	NR	NR	NR	NR	NR	NR	NR	NR	NR	NR
Denver	1	1	1	1	1	1	1	1	2	2	4	5	6	6	6	5	5	6	6	7	6	7	6	6	6	2	3
Miami	NR	NR	NR	NR	NR	NR	NR	NR	NR	NR	NR	NR	NR	NR	NR	NR	NR	NR	NR	NR	NR	NR	NR	NR	NR	NR	NR
Minnesota Duluth	18	NR	NR	NR	NR	NR	NR	NR	NR	NR	NR	NR	NR	NR	NR	NR	NR	NR	NR	NR	NR	NR	NR	NR	NR	NR	NR
North Dakota	6	6	5	7	7	10	10	14	15	17	18	15	15	17	16	16	17	16	17	18	18	18	18	17	19	18	18
Omaha	17	16	12	19	NR	NR	NR	NR	NR	NR	NR	NR	NR	NR	NR	NR	NR	NR	20	NR	NR	NR	NR	NR	NR	NR	NR
St. Cloud State	16	15	13	14	10	14	11	10	9	9	9	10	11	10	14	17	NR	NR	NR	NR	NR	NR	NR	NR	NR	NR	NR
Western Michigan	15	17	16	13	14	13	11	9	7	7	6	6	4	5	5	4	3	4	4	3	4	5	3	3	3	1	1

=== Pairwise ===
Team	1	2	3	4	5	6	7	8	9	10	11	13	14	15	16	17	18	19	20	21	22	23	24	Final
Arizona State	14	23	39	31	25	33	39	18	19	16	18	17	15	14	12	14	13	13	15	16	16	16	15	16
Colorado College	28	43	55	19	16	18	15	15	14	19	18	15	28	33	33	31	35	32	32	32	32	37	33	33
Denver	4	27	2	1	1	1	1	8	9	6	7	6	5	6	4	7	8	8	10	9	9	9	9	9
Miami	17	24	26	52	50	51	57	59	59	61	61	61	60	61	62	61	62	62	62	62	62	62	62	62
Minnesota Duluth	24	25	45	26	26	39	32	39	39	43	41	41	44	33	34	36	37	41	40	39	41	42	42	42
North Dakota	28	40	7	9	30	16	23	20	25	26	22	25	20	19	23	26	22	23	18	18	18	18	17	18
Omaha	28	7	36	46	55	59	53	48	45	41	46	49	44	42	39	35	33	27	31	27	27	27	30	30
St. Cloud State	4	2	8	5	9	9	6	9	7	8	11	8	9	17	22	27	29	35	34	37	32	33	36	36
Western Michigan	28	8	4	12	10	8	9	5	5	5	5	5	7	7	5	6	5	5	5	5	5	5	5	4

Note: teams ranked in the top-10 automatically qualify for the NCAA tournament. Teams ranked 11-16 can qualify based upon conference tournament results.

== Awards ==
=== NCHC ===
Award		Recipient
Player of the Year		Zeev Buium, Denver
Rookie of the Year		Sacha Boisvert, North Dakota
Goaltender of the Year		Šimon Latkoczy, Omaha
Forward of the Year		Alex Bump, Western Michigan
Defensive Defenseman of the Year		Ty Murchison, Arizona State
Offensive Defenseman of the Year		Zeev Buium, Denver
Defensive Forward of the Year		Tim Washe, Western Michigan
Scholar-Athlete of the Year		Matt Davis, Denver
Three Stars Award		Artem Shlaine, Arizona State
Sportsmanship Award		Joe Molenaar, Minnesota Duluth
Herb Brooks Coach of the Year		Pat Ferschweiler, Western Michigan
Frozen Faceoff MVP		Alex Bump, Western Michigan
All-NCHC Teams
First Team	Position	Second Team
Šimon Latkoczy, Omaha	G	Hampton Slukynsky, Western Michigan
Zeev Buium, Denver	D	Noah Beck, Arizona State
Jake Livanavage, North Dakota	D	Max Burkholder, Colorado College
Alex Bump, Western Michigan	F	Lukas Sillinger, Arizona State
Jack Devine, Denver	F	Luke Grainger, Western Michigan
Artem Shlaine, Arizona State	F	Sam Stange, Omaha
	F	Aidan Thompson, Denver
Third Team	Position	Rookie Team
Cameron Rowe, Western Michigan	G	Hampton Slukynsky, Western Michigan
Eric Pohlkamp, Denver	D	Colin Ralph, St. Cloud State
Joona Väisänen, Western Michigan	D	Joona Väisänen, Western Michigan
Sam Harris, Denver	F	Sacha Boisvert, North Dakota
Carter King, Denver	F	Austin Burnevik, St. Cloud State
Ryan Kirwan, Arizona State	F	Max Plante, Minnesota Duluth
	F	Cullen Potter, Arizona State

== 2025 NHL entry draft ==
Round	Pick	Player	College	NHL team
1	18	Cole Reschny ^{†}	North Dakota	Calgary Flames
1	32	Cullen Potter	Arizona State	Calgary Flames
3	79	Cooper Simpson ^{†}	North Dakota	Boston Bruins
3	88	Kristian Epperson ^{†}	Denver	Los Angeles Kings
4	124	Zack Sharp	Western Michigan	San Jose Sharks
5	130	Ryan Miller ^{†}	Denver	Pittsburgh Penguins
5	138	Sam Laurila ^{†}	North Dakota	New York Islanders
5	151	Everett Baldwin ^{†}	North Dakota	Tampa Bay Lightning
6	167	Ashton Schultz ^{†}	North Dakota	Buffalo Sabres
6	169	Carter Sanderson ^{†}	North Dakota	Pittsburgh Penguins
7	193	Caleb Heil ^{†}	North Dakota	Tampa Bay Lightning
7	196	Brendan McMorrow ^{†}	Denver	Los Angeles Kings
7	198	Jeremy Loranger ^{†}	Omaha	Columbus Blue Jackets
7	214	Nolan Roed ^{†}	St. Cloud State	Colorado Avalanche

† incoming freshman
