= 2024–25 Arizona State Sun Devils men's ice hockey season =

Desert Hockey Classic, Champion
- Conference: 2nd NCHC
- Home ice: Mullett Arena

Rankings
- USCHO: #16
- USA Hockey: #16

Record
- Overall: 21–14–2
- Conference: 14–9–1
- Home: 13–6–1
- Road: 8–7–1
- Neutral: 0–1–0

Coaches and captains
- Head coach: Greg Powers
- Assistant coaches: Alex Hicks; Dana Borges; Mike Corbett
- Captain: Ethan Szmagaj
- Alternate captain(s): Benji Eckerle; Ty Jackson; Ty Murchison; Lukas Sillinger

The 2024–25 Arizona State Sun Devils men's ice hockey season was the 10th season of play for the program at the Division I level and 1st in the NCHC. The Sun Devils represented Arizona State University in the 2024–25 NCAA Division I men's ice hockey season, played their homes games at the Mullett Arena and were coached by Greg Powers in his 13th season.

== Season ==
For the program's first season in the NCHC, Arizona State did not get off to a good start. Though they were ranked in the pre-season polls, ASU quickly fell off the board and had a dreadful record by the beginning of November. In the first five weeks, the team won just 3 of its 10 games with two of those coming against Northern Michigan, the program who finished dead last in the national rankings by year's end. The one saving grace for the Sun Devils was that many of their early-season matches were against other ranked teams, which kept the team's postseason hopes alive, but only just. Five of the team's seven losses were by only 1 goal so the club only needed a small improvement but by mid-November they were desperate for wins.

Just before Thanksgiving, Arizona State travelled to face the #1 team in the nation, defending champion Denver. The Pioneers were sitting on an unblemished record at the time and looked to be setting themselves up for yet another title. In a stunning result, ASU swept the Pioneers in the weekend thanks in large part to four goals from Artem Shlaine. This was not only the first time that ASU had defeated a top-ranked school but the first time that they had done so on the road and in consecutive games. This was also the first time that Denver had been swept at home since February of 2020. Aside from the historical aspects, the pair of wins completely chanced the complexion of the Sun Devils' season. ASU jumped more than 20 spots in the PairWise rankings and found themselves just outside the playoff bubble with plenty of opportunities to continue moving up.

The team followed up their historic weekend by winning 8 of their next 10 games before and after the winter break. This stretch included five victories over ranked opponents and lifted ASU not only into the top half of the conference standings but also into position for a potential at-large bid. Unfortunately, the team began to lose steam once February rolled around. After sweeping their series with Miami, the worst team in the conference, Arizona State was unable to win consecutive games for the rest of the regular season. The program saw their ranking slip from a high of 12th to 16th by the start of the conference tournament.

Due to the poor performance of two other conferences during the season, Arizona State's only hope to making the NCAA tournament would be to either win the NCHC championship outright or reach the championship game and then hope that there were no upsets by lower-ranked clubs. With their goaltending being consistently adequate throughout the year, ASU's playoff hopes rested largely on their offense. Fortunately, the Sun Devils were a top five team in goal scoring and they were able to pull out two narrow victories over a down Minnesota Duluth team. In their vital semifinal match against Denver, Arizona State got off to a bad start but they managed to recover in the second period. Goals from two of their top scorers (Shlaine and Ryan Kirwan) had the match tied going into the third but the Pioneers were able to regain the lead midway through the frame. With their offense unable to match, the team was forced to pull Luke Pavicich for an extra attacker. An empty-net goal from Denver sealed the team's fate and Arizona State ended its largely successful season just on the outside of the national tournament.

== Departures ==
Player	Position	Nationality	Cause
Cade Alami	Defenseman	United States	Transferred to Minnesota State
Brian Chambers	Forward	United States	Graduation (signed with Kalamazoo Wings)
Tyler Gratton	Forward	United States	Graduation (signed with Reading Royals)
Matthew Kopperud	Forward	United States	Graduation (signed with Bridgeport Islanders)
Hank Levy	Goaltender	United States	Left program (retired)
Tim Lovell	Defenseman	United States	Graduate transfer to Michigan
Jackson Niedermayer	Forward	United States	Transferred to Bowling Green
Joshua Niedermayer	Defenseman	United States	Returned to juniors (Dubuque Fighting Saints)
Ryan O'Reilly	Forward	United States	Graduate transfer to Providence
Matthew Romer	Forward	United States	Transferred to Northern Michigan
T. J. Semptimphelter	Goaltender	United States	Transferred to North Dakota
Brandon Tabakin	Defenseman	United States	Graduation (signed with Newfoundland Growlers)
Alex Young	Forward	Canada	Graduation (signed with Adirondack Thunder)

== Recruiting ==
Player	Position	Nationality	Age	Notes
Noah Beck	Defenseman	Canada	23	Richmond Hill, ON; graduate transfer from Clarkson; selected 194th overall in 2020
Brasen Boser	Defenseman	United States	20	Minot, ND
Zakari Brice	Goaltender	United States	21	Fairbanks, AK
Sam Court	Defenseman	Canada	20	Winnipeg, MB
Chase Hamm	Goaltender	Canada	22	Saskatoon, SK; joined from club team
Ryan Kirwan	Forward	United States	22	DeWitt, NY; transfer from Penn State
Joel Kjellberg	Defenseman	Sweden	20	Nacka, SWE
Cruz Lucius	Forward	United States	20	Lawrence, KS; transfer from Wisconsin; selected 124th overall in 2022
Hunter Mullett	Defenseman	United States	20	Hartland, WI
Luke Pavicich	Goaltender	United States	22	Clarence Center, NY; transfer from Massachusetts Lowell
Cullen Potter	Forward	United States	17	Hortonville, WI
Bennett Schimek	Forward	United States	21	Mendota Heights, MN; transfer from Providence
Artem Shlaine	Forward	Russia	22	Moscow, RUS; graduate transfer from Northern Michigan; selected 130th overall in 2020

== Roster ==
As of August 31, 2024.

No.	Nat.	Player	Class	Pos	Height	Weight	DoB	Hometown	Previous team	NHL rights
1	(Canada)	Chase Hamm	Sophomore	G	5' 9" (1.75 m)	168 lb (76 kg)	2002-01-06	Saskatoon, Saskatchewan	Arizona State (ACHA)	—
1	(United States)	Luke Pavicich	Senior	G	6' 3" (1.91 m)	190 lb (86 kg)	2002-03-21	Clarence Center, New York	Massachusetts Lowell (HEA)	—
2	(Canada)	Noah Beck	Graduate	D	6' 3" (1.91 m)	191 lb (87 kg)	2001-03-25	Richmond Hill, Ontario	Clarkson (ECAC)	STL, 194th overall 2020
5	(United States)	Ty Murchison (A)	Senior	D	6' 2" (1.88 m)	195 lb (88 kg)	2003-02-02	Corona, California	USNTDP (USHL)	PHI, 158th overall 2021
7	(Sweden)	Joel Kjellberg	Freshman	D	6' 0" (1.83 m)	190 lb (86 kg)	2004-04-29	Nacka, Sweden	Cedar Rapids RoughRiders (USHL)	—
8	(Russia)	Artem Shlaine	Graduate	F	6' 1" (1.85 m)	190 lb (86 kg)	2002-03-07	Moscow, Russia	Northern Michigan (CCHA)	NJD, 130th overall 2020
9	(United States)	Anthony Dowd	Sophomore	D	5' 6" (1.68 m)	154 lb (70 kg)	2003-04-25	Point Pleasant Beach, New Jersey	Chicago Steel (USHL)	—
10	(United States)	Tucker Ness	Junior	D	6' 3" (1.91 m)	219 lb (99 kg)	2002-11-25	Plymouth, Minnesota	Waterloo Black Hawks (USHL)	—
11	(United States)	Benji Eckerle (A)	Graduate	F	5' 10" (1.78 m)	180 lb (82 kg)	1999-09-24	Northville, Michigan	Tri-City Storm (USHL)	—
12	(United States)	Cullen Potter	Freshman	F	5' 9" (1.75 m)	161 lb (73 kg)	2007-01-10	Hortonville, Wisconsin	USNTDP (USHL)	—
13	(United States)	Hunter Mullett	Freshman	D	6' 0" (1.83 m)	179 lb (81 kg)	2003-10-17	Hartland, Wisconsin	Islanders Hockey Club (NCDC)	—
14	(Canada)	Ty Jackson (A)	Graduate	F	5' 8" (1.73 m)	160 lb (73 kg)	2001-09-06	Oakville, Ontario	Northeastern (HEA)	—
15	(Canada)	Dylan Jackson	Graduate	F	5' 10" (1.78 m)	170 lb (77 kg)	2001-09-06	Oakville, Ontario	Northeastern (HEA)	—
16	(United States)	Ethan Szmagaj (C)	Senior	D	6' 0" (1.83 m)	195 lb (88 kg)	2001-09-18	Canton, Michigan	Waterloo Black Hawks (USHL)	—
18	(United States)	David Hymovitch	Sophomore	F	5' 11" (1.8 m)	181 lb (82 kg)	2003-08-14	Phoenix, Arizona	Muskegon Lumberjacks (USHL)	—
23	(United States)	Bennett Schimek	Junior	F	6' 0" (1.83 m)	188 lb (85 kg)	2003-04-15	Mendota Heights, Minnesota	Providence (USHL)	—
25	(United States)	Kyle Smolen	Sophomore	F	5' 11" (1.8 m)	171 lb (78 kg)	2002-06-18	Crystal Lake, Illinois	Fargo Force (USHL)	—
29	(United States)	Cole Gordon	Sophomore	F	6' 2" (1.88 m)	205 lb (93 kg)	2002-12-09	Windsor, Colorado	Minnesota Wilderness (NAHL)	—
31	(United States)	Gibson Homer	Sophomore	G	6' 5" (1.96 m)	209 lb (95 kg)	2003-12-29	Grand Rapids, Michigan	Chicago Steel (USHL)	—
37	(Canada)	Sam Court	Freshman	D	5' 10" (1.78 m)	190 lb (86 kg)	2004-01-07	Winnipeg, Manitoba	Sioux City Musketeers (USHL)	—
39	(United States)	Zakari Brice	Freshman	G	5' 11" (1.8 m)	174 lb (79 kg)	2003-01-25	Fairbanks, Alaska	New Jersey Jr. Titans (USHL)	—
43	(United States)	Cole Helm	Sophomore	F	5' 10" (1.78 m)	195 lb (88 kg)	2003-07-17	Dallas, Texas	Dubuque Fighting Saints (BCHL)	—
51	(United States)	Cruz Lucius	Junior	F	6' 0" (1.83 m)	178 lb (81 kg)	2004-04-05	Grant, Minnesota	Wisconsin (Big Ten)	PIT, 124th overall 2022
53	(Canada)	Ryan Alexander	Junior	F	5' 10" (1.78 m)	178 lb (81 kg)	2002-06-17	Toronto, Ontario	Fargo Force (USHL)	—
61	(Canada)	Lukas Sillinger (A)	Graduate	F	5' 10" (1.78 m)	170 lb (77 kg)	2000-09-14	Regina, Saskatchewan	Bemidji State (CCHA)	—
74	(United States)	Brasen Boser	Freshman	D	5' 11" (1.8 m)	176 lb (80 kg)	2004-02-29	Minot, North Dakota	Fargo Force (USHL)	—
82	(United States)	Charlie Schoen	Sophomore	F	5' 10" (1.78 m)	160 lb (73 kg)	2001-06-02	Andover, Minnesota	Sioux City Musketeers (USHL)	—
89	(United States)	Tony Achille	Sophomore	F	5' 11" (1.8 m)	173 lb (78 kg)	2002-01-08	Hingham, Massachusetts	Maine Nordiques (NAHL)	—
92	(United States)	Ryan Kirwan	Senior	F	6' 2" (1.88 m)	195 lb (88 kg)	2002-02-27	DeWitt, New York	Penn State (Big Ten)	—

== Standings ==
2024–25 National Collegiate Hockey Conference Standings
	Conference record										Overall record					
	GP	W	L	T	OTW	OTL	SW	PTS	GF	GA	GP	W	L	T	GF	GA
#1 Western Michigan †*	24	19	4	1	4	3	0	57	98	51	42	34	7	1	167	86
#16 Arizona State	24	14	9	1	2	5	1	47	91	69	37	21	14	2	136	103
#3 Denver	24	15	8	1	2	1	0	45	89	59	44	31	12	1	174	94
Omaha	24	14	9	1	1	1	1	44	82	69	36	18	17	1	105	99
#18 North Dakota	24	14	9	1	3	1	1	42	81	73	38	21	15	2	120	111
Colorado College	24	11	12	1	4	1	1	32	68	72	37	18	18	1	106	113
Minnesota Duluth	24	9	13	2	2	2	1	30	63	77	36	13	20	3	99	117
St. Cloud State	24	7	16	1	2	3	0	23	53	79	36	14	21	1	79	110
Miami	24	0	23	1	0	3	0	4	38	114	34	3	28	3	63	143
Championship: March 22, 2025 † indicates conference regular season champion (Penrose Cup) * indicates conference tournament champion (Frozen Faceoff Championship Trophy); Rankings: USCHO.com Top 20 Poll

== Schedule and results ==
Date	Time	Opponent^{#}	Rank^{#}	Site	TV	Decision	Result	Attendance	Record
Regular Season
October 4	7:05 pm	at Air Force*	#20т	Cadet Ice Arena • USAF Academy, Colorado	FloHockey	Homer	W 8–1	2,078	1–0–0
October 5	7:05 pm	at Air Force*	#20т	Cadet Ice Arena • USAF Academy, Colorado	FloHockey	Pavicich	L 3–4 ^{OT}	1,626	1–1–0
October 11	3:30 pm	#10 Michigan*		Mullett Arena • Tempe, Arizona		Homer	L 1–4	5,156	1–2–0
October 12	5:00 pm	#10 Michigan*		Mullett Arena • Tempe, Arizona	Fox 10 Xtra	Homer	T 3–3	5,354	1–2–1
October 18	4:00 pm	at #14 Providence*		Schneider Arena • Providence, Rhode Island	ESPN+	Homer	L 1–4	3,030	1–3–1
October 19	1:00 pm	at #14 Providence*		Schneider Arena • Providence, Rhode Island	ESPN+	Pavicich	L 1–2	2,360	1–4–1
October 25	4:07 pm	at Northern Michigan*		Berry Events Center • Marquette, Michigan	Midco Sports+	Pavicich	W 3–1	2,576	2–4–1
October 26	3:07 pm	at Northern Michigan*		Berry Events Center • Marquette, Michigan	Midco Sports+	Homer	W 2–0	2,772	3–4–1
November 8	7:00 pm	at #8 Colorado College		Ed Robson Arena • Colorado Springs, Colorado	SOCO CW	Homer	L 3–4 ^{OT}	3,650	3–5–1 (0–1–0)
November 9	6:00 pm	at #8 Colorado College		Ed Robson Arena • Colorado Springs, Colorado		Pavicich	L 1–3	3,710	3–6–1 (0–2–0)
November 15	7:00 pm	Omaha		Mullett Arena • Tempe, Arizona	FOX 10	Pavicich	L 2–4	5,157	3–7–1 (0–3–0)
November 16	5:00 pm	Omaha		Mullett Arena • Tempe, Arizona	FOX 10	Pavicich	W 3–2	5,025	4–7–1 (1–3–0)
November 22	7:00 pm	at #1 Denver		Magness Arena • Denver, Colorado		Pavicich	W 3–2	6,304	5–7–1 (2–3–0)
November 23	6:00 pm	at #1 Denver		Magness Arena • Denver, Colorado		Pavicich	W 5–2	6,490	6–7–1 (3–3–0)
December 6	7:00 pm	Minnesota Duluth	#19	Mullett Arena • Tempe, Arizona	FOX 10 Xtra	Pavicich	W 5–3	5,017	7–7–1 (4–3–0)
December 7	5:00 pm	Minnesota Duluth	#19	Mullett Arena • Tempe, Arizona		Pavicich	W 3–2 ^{OT}	5,009	8–7–1 (5–3–0)
December 28	1:00 pm	USNTDP*	#19	Mullett Arena • Tempe, Arizona (Exhibition)		Homer	W 4–3	4,197	
December 29	1:00 pm	USNTDP*	#19	Mullett Arena • Tempe, Arizona (Exhibition)		Homer	W 1–0	4,002	
Desert Hockey Classic
January 3	7:00 pm	Robert Morris*	#19	Mullett Arena • Tempe, Arizona (Desert Hockey Classic Semifinal)		Pavicich	W 7–3	4,182	9–7–1
January 4	7:00 pm	#16 Cornell*	#19	Mullett Arena • Tempe, Arizona (Desert Hockey Classic Championship)		Homer	W 4–0	4,340	10–7–1
Regular Season
January 10	7:00 pm	#14 North Dakota	#16	Mullett Arena • Tempe, Arizona	CBSSN	Homer	W 4–1	5,174	11–7–1 (6–3–0)
January 11	5:00 pm	#14 North Dakota	#16	Mullett Arena • Tempe, Arizona	Fox 10 Xtra	Pavicich	L 3–4 ^{OT}	5,205	11–8–1 (6–4–0)
January 17	5:30 pm	at #15 St. Cloud State	#13	Herb Brooks National Hockey Center • St. Cloud, Minnesota	Fox 9+, Fox 10 Xtra	Homer	W 6–3	3,245	12–8–1 (7–4–0)
January 18	4:00 pm	at #15 St. Cloud State	#13	Herb Brooks National Hockey Center • St. Cloud, Minnesota	Fox 9+	Homer	W 5–3	3,697	13–8–1 (8–4–0)
January 24	7:00 pm	#19 Colorado College	#11	Mullett Arena • Tempe, Arizona		Pavicich	W 4–1	5,150	14–8–1 (9–4–0)
January 25	5:00 pm	#19 Colorado College	#11	Mullett Arena • Tempe, Arizona	Fox 10 Xtra	Homer	L 4–5	5,160	14–9–1 (9–5–0)
January 31	4:05 pm	at Miami	#12	Steve Cady Arena • Oxford, Ohio		Pavicich	W 7–1	2,303	15–9–1 (10–5–0)
February 1	4:05 pm	at Miami	#12	Steve Cady Arena • Oxford, Ohio		Pavicich	W 4–1	2,257	16–9–1 (11–5–0)
February 7	7:00 pm	#6 Denver	#12	Mullett Arena • Tempe, Arizona	CBSSN, Fox 10 Xtra	Pavicich	L 4–5 ^{OT}	5,215	16–10–1 (11–6–0)
February 8	5:00 pm	#6 Denver	#12	Mullett Arena • Tempe, Arizona	Fox 10 Xtra	Pavicich	W 6–5 ^{OT}	5,191	17–10–1 (12–6–0)
February 14	6:07 pm	at Minnesota Duluth	#10	AMSOIL Arena • Duluth, Minnesota		Pavicich	L 2–3 ^{OT}	5,579	17–11–1 (12–7–0)
February 15	5:07 pm	at Minnesota Duluth	#10	AMSOIL Arena • Duluth, Minnesota		Homer	T 3–3 ^{SOW}	5,701	17–11–2 (12–7–1)
February 21	7:00 pm	#3 Western Michigan	#12	Mullett Arena • Tempe, Arizona		Pavicich	W 5–3	5,323	18–11–2 (13–7–1)
February 22	5:00 pm	#3 Western Michigan	#12	Mullett Arena • Tempe, Arizona		Pavicich	L 3–4 ^{OT}	5,250	18–12–2 (13–8–1)
February 28	6:07 pm	at Omaha	#12	Baxter Arena • Omaha, Nebraska		Homer	W 4–1	7,802	19–12–2 (14–8–1)
March 1	6:07 pm	at Omaha	#12	Baxter Arena • Omaha, Nebraska		Homer	L 2–4	7,802	19–13–2 (14–9–1)
NCHC Tournament
March 14	7:00 pm	Minnesota Duluth*	#12	Mullett Arena • Tempe, Arizona (NCHC Quarterfinal Game 1)		Pavicich	W 4–3	5,236	20–13–2
March 15	6:00 pm	Minnesota Duluth*	#12	Mullett Arena • Tempe, Arizona (NCHC Quarterfinal Game 2)		Homer	W 6–5 ^{OT}	5,182	21–13–2
March 21	3:00 pm	vs. #6 Denver*	#11	Xcel Energy Center • Saint Paul, Minnesota (NCHC Semifinal)	CBSSN	Pavicich	L 2–4	7,532	21–14–2
*Non-conference game. ^{#}Rankings from USCHO.com Poll. All times are in Mountain Time. Source:

== Scoring statistics ==
Name	Position	Games	Goals	Assists	Points	PIM
Ryan Kirwan	LW	37	26	13	39	6
Artem Shlaine	C	31	17	21	38	16
Lukas Sillinger	W/C	35	8	30	38	12
Bennett Schimek	F	35	15	22	37	4
Noah Beck	D	37	5	28	33	28
Kyle Smolen	F	35	12	18	30	22
Ty Jackson	C	35	8	16	24	18
Cullen Potter	LW	35	13	9	22	6
Dylan Jackson	RW	25	7	9	16	10
Anthony Dowd	D	37	2	11	13	10
Sam Court	D	36	3	8	11	16
Joel Kjellberg	D	34	0	11	11	12
Cruz Lucius	RW	19	2	8	10	14
Charlie Schoen	RW	18	4	5	9	4
Ryan Alexander	C/LW	31	3	5	8	6
Benji Eckerle	F	24	3	4	7	12
Brasen Boser	D	37	2	5	7	8
Cole Gordon	F	34	3	2	5	4
David Hymovitch	F	23	2	3	5	0
Ethan Szmagaj	D	29	1	4	5	0
Ty Murchison	D	37	0	4	4	48
Tucker Ness	D	21	0	2	2	6
Cole Helm	F	3	0	1	1	2
Tony Achille	F	15	0	0	0	2
Gibson Homer	G	16	0	0	0	0
Luke Pavicich	G	23	0	0	0	0
Bench	-	-	-	-	-	8
Total			136	239	375	274

== Goaltending statistics ==
Name	Games	Minutes	Wins	Losses	Ties	Goals against	Saves	Shut outs	SV %	GAA
Gibson Homer	16	937:08	8	5	2	40	452	2	.919	2.56
Luke Pavicich	23	1300:29	13	9	0	57	566	0	.900	2.63
Empty Net	-	21:09	-	-	-	6	-	-	-	-
Total	37	2258:46	21	14	2	103	1027	2	.909	2.74

== Rankings ==
Poll	Week																											
Poll	Pre	1	2	3	4	5	6	7	8	9	10	11	12	13	14	15	16	17	18	19	20	21	22	23	24	25	26	27 (Final)
USCHO.com	20т	RV	RV	RV	RV	RV	RV	RV	19	19	19	19	–	19	16	13	11	12	12	10	12	12	12	12	11	15	–	16
USA Hockey	RV	RV	RV	RV	RV	RV	RV	RV	20	19	20	19	–	RV	15	13	11	13	12	11	12	13	13	13	12	15	16	16

Note: USCHO did not release a poll in week 12 or 26.
Note: USA Hockey did not release a poll in week 12.

== Awards and honors ==
Player	Award	Ref
Ty Murchison	NCHC Defensive Defenseman of the Year	
Artem Shlaine	Three Stars Award	
Artem Shlaine	All-NCHC First Team	
Noah Beck	All-NCHC Second Team	
Lukas Sillinger	All-NCHC Second Team	
Ryan Kirwan	All-NCHC Third Team	
Cullen Potter	NCHC All-Rookie Team	
Artem Shlaine	NCHC Frozen Faceoff All-Tournament Team	

== 2025 NHL entry draft ==
Round	Pick	Player	NHL team
1	32	Cullen Potter	Calgary Flames

† incoming freshman
