= 2024–25 Miami RedHawks men's ice hockey season =

- Conference: 9th NCHC
- Home ice: Steve Cady Arena

Rankings
- USCHO: NR
- USA Hockey: NR

Record
- Overall: 3–28–3
- Conference: 0–23–1
- Home: 3–16–0
- Road: 0–12–3

Coaches and captains
- Head coach: Anthony Noreen
- Assistant coaches: Troy Thibodeau; Zack Cisek; David Nies
- Captain: Ryan Sullivan
- Alternate captain(s): Blake Mesenburg; Dylan Moulton

The 2024–25 Miami RedHawks men's ice hockey season was the 47th season of play for the program and the 12th in the NCHC. The RedHawks represented Miami University in the 2024–25 NCAA Division I men's ice hockey season, played their home games at the Steve Cady Arena and were coached by Anthony Noreen in his 1st season.

== Season ==
Miami had one of the worst seasons in the history of the team. Though Anthony Noreen was taking over a moribund program that had not had double-digit wins in six years, the RedHaws somehow got even worse. The combination of a new system for the entire team as well as a sizable number of new players caused the team to have one of the worst offenses in the nation. Only Northern Michigan, who were virtually fielding a completely new lineup, scored fewer goals than Miami, with the RedHawks averaging 1.85 goals per game. Compounding their problems was a very poor goaltending rotation where Bruno Brūveris, Ethan Dahlmeir and Brett Miller each allowed approximately 4 goals per game. All that being said, Miami did not have a terrible start with the club playing .500 hockey in the first month of the season. However, the team's three wins during that time all came against some of the lowest-ranked clubs in the nation. Once the RedHawks began their conference schedule, Miami wasn't able to win a single match. The closest the team came was a shootout loss with a floundering Minnesota Duluth near the end of the year after three previous overtime games had ended with losses.

Miami set records for futility, breaking records that they had set the year before in terms of fewest NCHC wins (0), fewest points in the standings (4) and fewest wins in program history (3). Additionally, due in part to conference expansion, Miami had the ignominious distinction of becoming the first NCHC team to not participate in the playoffs as the conference tournament no longer included all league members.

== Departures ==
Player	Position	Nationality	Cause
Matthew Barbolini	Forward	United States	Graduation (signed with Toronto Marlies)
Jack Clement	Defenseman	United States	Graduation (signed with Cincinnati Cyclones)
Robby Drazner	Defenseman	United States	Graduate transfer to Western Michigan
P. J. Fletcher	Forward	United States	Graduation (signed with Florida Everblades)
Axel Kumlin	Defenseman	Sweden	Transferred to Notre Dame
Teddy Lagerback	Forward	United States	Transferred to Stonehill
Carter McPhail	Goaltender	United States	Graduate transfer to Mercyhurst
Logan Neaton	Goaltender	United States	Graduation (signed with Norfolk Admirals)
Albin Nilsson	Forward	Sweden	Graduation (signed with Kalmar HC)

== Recruiting ==
Player	Position	Nationality	Age	Notes
Colby Ambrosio	Forward	Canada	22	Welland, ON; graduate transfer from Boston College; selected 118th overall in 2020
Matt Choupani	Forward	Canada	22	Montreal, QC; transfer from Northeastern
Ethan Dahlmeir	Goaltender	United States	21	Lakeville, MN
Nick Donato	Defenseman	United States	22	Chicago, IL; returned to program
John Emmons	Forward	United States	20	Washington, MI
Christophe Fillion	Forward	Canada	24	Sherbrooke, QC; graduate transfer from Quinnipiac
Teodor Forssander	Forward	Sweden	20	Gothenburg, SWE
David Grosek	Forward	United States	21	Doylestown, PA
Conner Hutchison	Defenseman	United States	24	Hicksville, NY; graduate transfer from Sacred Heart
Brett Miller	Goaltender	United States	25	Northville, MI; graduate transfer from Rensselaer
Casper Nässén	Forward	Sweden	20	Norrtälje, SWE; selected 214th overall in 2023
Brian Silver	Forward	United States	23	Lake Bluff, IL; graduate transfer from Augustana

== Roster ==
As of August 15, 2024.

No.	Nat.	Player	Class	Pos	Height	Weight	DoB	Hometown	Previous team	NHL rights
2	(United States)	Spencer Cox	Senior	D	6' 0" (1.83 m)	185 lb (84 kg)	2001-02-07	Dublin, Ohio	Long Island (NCAA)	—
3	(United States)	Nick Donato	Senior	D	6' 0" (1.83 m)	190 lb (86 kg)	2002-07-27	Lake Forest, Illinois	Tri-City Storm (USHL)	—
4	(United States)	Michael Feenstra	Junior	D	6' 3" (1.91 m)	195 lb (88 kg)	2001-04-03	Grand Haven, Michigan	Dubuque Fighting Saints (USHL)	—
6	(Latvia)	Raimonds Vītoliņš	Senior	F	6' 0" (1.83 m)	186 lb (84 kg)	2002-01-12	Ogre, Latvia	Green Bay Gamblers (USHL)	—
7	(United States)	Michael Quinn	Freshman	D	5' 11" (1.8 m)	172 lb (78 kg)	2003-03-25	St. Louis, Missouri	Fargo Force (USHL)	—
8	(United States)	John Emmons	Freshman	F	5' 11" (1.8 m)	170 lb (77 kg)	2004-01-05	Washington, Michigan	Minot Minotauros (NAHL)	—
9	(Canada)	Matt Choupani	Senior	F	5' 11" (1.8 m)	185 lb (84 kg)	2002-01-02	Baie-D'Urfé, Quebec	Des Moines Buccaneers (USHL)	—
10	(United States)	Zane Demsey	Junior	D	6' 2" (1.88 m)	190 lb (86 kg)	2001-11-04	Harrison Township, Michigan	Dubuque Fighting Saints (USHL)	—
11	(Sweden)	William Hallén	Junior	F	6' 1" (1.85 m)	187 lb (85 kg)	2002-04-15	Gothenburg, Sweden	Dubuque Fighting Saints (USHL)	—
13	(United States)	Max Dukovac	Junior	F	6' 2" (1.88 m)	182 lb (83 kg)	2002-02-19	Aurora, Illinois	Langley Rivermen (BCHL)	—
14	(Sweden)	Teodor Forssander	Freshman	F	5' 8" (1.73 m)	152 lb (69 kg)	2004-04-25	Gothenburg, Sweden	Frölunda HC J20 (J20 Nationell)	—
16	(Sweden)	Hampus Rydqvist	Graduate	D	5' 10" (1.78 m)	185 lb (84 kg)	1999-03-12	Gothenburg, Sweden	Maryland Black Bears (NAHL)	—
17	(United States)	John Waldron	Junior	F	6' 1" (1.85 m)	185 lb (84 kg)	2002-11-13	Batavia, Illinois	Waterloo Black Hawks (USHL)	—
18	(Canada)	Frankie Carogioiello	Junior	F	5' 10" (1.78 m)	173 lb (78 kg)	2002-06-21	Woodbridge, Ontario	Chilliwack Chiefs (BCHL)	—
19	(Latvia)	Rihards Simanovičs	Sophomore	D	6' 3" (1.91 m)	205 lb (93 kg)	2003-10-07	Riga, Latvia	Amarillo Wranglers (NAHL)	—
22	(United States)	Ryan Sullivan (C)	Graduate	F	5' 11" (1.8 m)	190 lb (86 kg)	2000-03-07	Grosse Pointe, Michigan	Massachusetts (HEA)	—
23	(Canada)	Brayden Morrison	Junior	F	5' 11" (1.8 m)	175 lb (79 kg)	2002-05-04	Calgary, Alberta	Dubuque Fighting Saints (USHL)	—
24	(United States)	Brian Silver	Graduate	F	5' 11" (1.8 m)	180 lb (82 kg)	2000-11-06	Lake Bluff, Illinois	Augustana (CCHA)	—
25	(Slovakia)	Artur Turanský	Junior	F	5' 11" (1.8 m)	176 lb (80 kg)	2001-07-12	Bratislava, Slovakia	Lone Star Brahmas (NAHL)	—
26	(United States)	Blake Mesenburg (A)	Junior	F	5' 11" (1.8 m)	183 lb (83 kg)	2002-06-05	Orono, Minnesota	St. Cloud Norsemen (NAHL)	—
27	(United States)	Dylan Moulton (A)	Graduate	D	6' 2" (1.88 m)	199 lb (90 kg)	2001-04-24	Nolensville, Tennessee	Green Bay Gamblers (USHL)	—
28	(United States)	Tanyon Bajzer	Sophomore	F	6' 1" (1.85 m)	180 lb (82 kg)	2002-08-25	Shaker Heights, Ohio	Odessa Jackalopes (NAHL)	—
30	(Latvia)	Bruno Brūveris	Sophomore	G	6' 0" (1.83 m)	170 lb (77 kg)	2002-03-09	Riga, Latvia	Cedar Rapids RoughRiders (USHL)	—
33	(Sweden)	Casper Nässén	Freshman	F	6' 4" (1.93 m)	205 lb (93 kg)	2004-04-11	Norrtälje, Sweden	Frölunda HC J20 (J20 Nationell)	BOS, 214th overall 2023
34	(Canada)	Christophe Fillion	Graduate	F	5' 11" (1.8 m)	175 lb (79 kg)	2000-06-18	Sherbrooke, Quebec	Quinnipiac (ECAC)	—
35	(United States)	Ethan Dahlmeir	Freshman	G	6' 4" (1.93 m)	216 lb (98 kg)	2003-09-07	Lakeville, Minnesota	Des Moines Buccaneers (USHL)	—
43	(United States)	Brett Miller	Graduate	G	6' 2" (1.88 m)	185 lb (84 kg)	1999-04-26	Northville, Michigan	Rensselaer (ECAC)	—
67	(Canada)	Colby Ambrosio	Graduate	F	5' 9" (1.75 m)	174 lb (79 kg)	2002-08-07	Welland, Ontario	Boston College (HEA)	COL, 118th overall 2020
74	(United States)	Conner Hutchison	Senior	D	5' 10" (1.78 m)	170 lb (77 kg)	2000-06-02	Hicksville, New York	Sacred Heart (AHA)	—
81	(United States)	David Grosek	Freshman	F	6' 1" (1.85 m)	190 lb (86 kg)	2003-06-23	Doylestown, Pennsylvania	Maine Nordiques (NAHL)	—

== Standings ==
2024–25 National Collegiate Hockey Conference Standings
	Conference record										Overall record					
	GP	W	L	T	OTW	OTL	SW	PTS	GF	GA	GP	W	L	T	GF	GA
#1 Western Michigan †*	24	19	4	1	4	3	0	57	98	51	42	34	7	1	167	86
#16 Arizona State	24	14	9	1	2	5	1	47	91	69	37	21	14	2	136	103
#3 Denver	24	15	8	1	2	1	0	45	89	59	44	31	12	1	174	94
Omaha	24	14	9	1	1	1	1	44	82	69	36	18	17	1	105	99
#18 North Dakota	24	14	9	1	3	1	1	42	81	73	38	21	15	2	120	111
Colorado College	24	11	12	1	4	1	1	32	68	72	37	18	18	1	106	113
Minnesota Duluth	24	9	13	2	2	2	1	30	63	77	36	13	20	3	99	117
St. Cloud State	24	7	16	1	2	3	0	23	53	79	36	14	21	1	79	110
Miami	24	0	23	1	0	3	0	4	38	114	34	3	28	3	63	143
Championship: March 22, 2025 † indicates conference regular season champion (Penrose Cup) * indicates conference tournament champion (Frozen Faceoff Championship Trophy); Rankings: USCHO.com Top 20 Poll

== Schedule and results ==
Date	Time	Opponent^{#}	Rank^{#}	Site	TV	Decision	Result	Attendance	Record
Regular Season
October 5	8:07 pm	at Ferris State*		Ewigleben Arena • Big Rapids, Michigan	Midco Sports+	Bruveris	T 3–3 ^{OT}	1,500	0–0–1
October 6	5:07 pm	at Ferris State*		Ewigleben Arena • Big Rapids, Michigan	Midco Sports+	Dahlmeir	T 4–4 ^{OT}	1,505	0–0–2
October 11	7:05 pm	Alaska Anchorage*		Steve Cady Arena • Oxford, Ohio		Bruveris	W 3–2	1,621	1–0–2
October 12	7:05 pm	Alaska Anchorage*		Steve Cady Arena • Oxford, Ohio		Bruveris	W 4–1	1,589	2–0–2
October 17	7:05 pm	Robert Morris*		Steve Cady Arena • Oxford, Ohio		Bruveris	L 1–5	2,526	2–1–2
October 19	7:00 pm	at Robert Morris*		Clearview Arena • Neville Township, Pennsylvania	FloHockey	Bruveris	L 1–4	1,150	2–2–2
October 25	7:05 pm	Lindenwood*		Steve Cady Arena • Oxford, Ohio		Bruveris	L 2–4	2,021	2–3–2
October 26	7:05 pm	Lindenwood*		Steve Cady Arena • Oxford, Ohio		Dahlmeir	W 4–1	1,804	3–3–2
November 1	7:05 pm	Renssealer*		Steve Cady Arena • Oxford, Ohio		Dahlmeir	L 2–3 ^{OT}	1,476	3–4–2
November 2	7:05 pm	Renssealer*		Steve Cady Arena • Oxford, Ohio		Bruveris	L 1–2	1,622	3–5–2
November 8	8:30 pm	at #12 St. Cloud State		Herb Brooks National Hockey Center • St. Cloud, Minnesota	Fox 9+	Dahlmeir	L 2–3 ^{OT}	—	3–6–2 (0–1–0)
November 9	7:00 pm	at #12 St. Cloud State		Herb Brooks National Hockey Center • St. Cloud, Minnesota	Fox 9+	Bruveris	L 1–3	3,278	3–7–2 (0–2–0)
November 15	7:05 pm	Minnesota Duluth		Steve Cady Arena • Oxford, Ohio		Dahlmeir	L 0–5	2,333	3–8–2 (0–3–0)
November 16	7:05 pm	Minnesota Duluth		Steve Cady Arena • Oxford, Ohio		Bruveris	L 2–7	2,391	3–9–2 (0–4–0)
November 22	8:07 pm	at Omaha		Baxter Arena • Omaha, Nebraska		Dahlmeir	L 0–3	6,225	3–10–2 (0–5–0)
November 23	8:07 pm	at Omaha		Baxter Arena • Omaha, Nebraska		Dahlmeir	L 1–8	7,294	3–11–2 (0–6–0)
December 6	7:05 pm	#16 North Dakota		Steve Cady Arena • Oxford, Ohio		Bruveris	L 4–5	1,773	3–12–2 (0–7–0)
December 7	7:05 pm	#16 North Dakota		Steve Cady Arena • Oxford, Ohio		Miller	L 2–4	2,046	3–13–2 (0–8–0)
January 10	9:00 pm	at #6 Denver		Magness Arena • Denver, Colorado		Bruveris	L 1–4	6,585	3–14–2 (0–9–0)
January 11	8:00 pm	at #6 Denver		Magness Arena • Denver, Colorado		Bruveris	L 2–6	6,719	3–15–2 (0–10–0)
January 17	7:05 pm	Omaha		Steve Cady Arena • Oxford, Ohio		Bruveris	L 1–4	1,777	3–16–2 (0–11–0)
January 18	7:05 pm	Omaha		Steve Cady Arena • Oxford, Ohio		Miller	L 1–3	2,129	3–17–2 (0–12–0)
January 24	7:00 pm	at #3 Western Michigan		Lawson Arena • Kalamazoo, Michigan		Dahlmeir	L 3–8	3,595	3–18–2 (0–13–0)
January 25	6:00 pm	at #3 Western Michigan		Lawson Arena • Kalamazoo, Michigan		Miller	L 0–2	3,840	3–19–2 (0–14–0)
January 31	7:05 pm	#12 Arizona State		Steve Cady Arena • Oxford, Ohio		Miller	L 1–7	2,303	3–20–2 (0–15–0)
February 1	7:05 pm	#12 Arizona State		Steve Cady Arena • Oxford, Ohio		Dahlmeir	L 1–4	2,257	3–21–2 (0–16–0)
February 14	9:00 pm	at #19 Colorado College		Ed Robson Arena • Colorado Springs, Colorado		Bruveris	L 1–6	3,446	3–22–2 (0–17–0)
February 15	8:00 pm	at #19 Colorado College		Ed Robson Arena • Colorado Springs, Colorado		Dahlmeir	L 4–5 ^{OT}	3,630	3–23–2 (0–18–0)
February 21	7:05 pm	#6 Denver		Steve Cady Arena • Oxford, Ohio		Dahlmeir	L 1–5	1,507	3–24–2 (0–19–0)
February 22	7:05 pm	#6 Denver		Steve Cady Arena • Oxford, Ohio		Dahlmeir	L 2–5	2,328	3–25–2 (0–20–0)
February 28	8:07 pm	at Minnesota Duluth		AMSOIL Arena • Duluth, Minnesota		Bruveris	L 2–3 ^{OT}	5,530	3–26–2 (0–21–0)
March 1	7:07 pm	at Minnesota Duluth		AMSOIL Arena • Duluth, Minnesota		Bruveris	T 1–1 ^{SOL}	5,556	3–26–3 (0–21–1)
March 7	7:05 pm	#4 Western Michigan		Steve Cady Arena • Oxford, Ohio		Bruveris	L 3–8	1,411	3–27–3 (0–22–1)
March 8	7:05 pm	#4 Western Michigan		Steve Cady Arena • Oxford, Ohio		Miller	L 2–5	2,338	3–28–3 (0–23–1)
*Non-conference game. ^{#}Rankings from USCHO.com Poll. All times are in Eastern Time. Source:

== Scoring statistics ==
Name	Position	Games	Goals	Assists	Points	PIM
Colby Ambrosio	C/RW	34	7	13	20	45
John Waldron	F	28	4	16	20	8
Matt Choupani	C	34	6	10	16	28
Raimonds Vītoliņš	C	31	4	10	14	12
Michael Quinn	D	34	2	10	12	4
Ryan Sullivan	F	34	6	4	10	8
Casper Nässén	LW/RW	34	6	4	10	10
Max Dukovac	F	25	5	5	10	14
Christophe Fillion	F	34	4	6	10	16
Conner Hutchison	D	33	2	7	9	22
Blake Mesenburg	C	34	4	3	7	12
Dylan Moulton	D	33	3	4	7	16
Hampus Rydqvist	D	28	2	3	5	10
Michael Feenstra	D	13	1	3	4	16
Spencer Cox	D/C	20	1	3	4	19
Rihards Simanovičs	D	34	1	3	4	10
Zane Demsey	D	28	1	2	3	40
William Hallén	C/LW	9	2	0	2	4
Frankie Carogioiello	C	32	1	1	2	24
Brayden Morrison	C	23	0	2	2	20
John Emmons	F	21	1	0	1	29
Artur Turansky	LW	11	0	1	1	0
Ethan Dahlmeir	G	14	0	1	1	0
Bruno Brūveris	G	19	0	1	1	0
Brian Silver	D	1	0	0	0	15
Brett Miller	G	7	0	0	0	0
Teodor Forssander	LW	11	0	0	0	0
Nick Donato	D	13	0	0	0	21
Tanyon Bajzer	RW	14	0	0	0	0
Bench	–	–	–	–	–	14
Total			63	112	175	417

== Goaltending statistics ==
Name	Games	Minutes	Wins	Losses	Ties	Goals against	Saves	Shut-outs	SV %	GAA
Brett Miller	7	347:28	0	5	0	23	152	0	.869	3.97
Ethan Dahlmeir	14	743:11	1	10	1	50	335	0	.865	4.04
Bruno Brūveris	19	955:38	2	13	2	66	426	0	.866	4.14
Empty Net	-	17:45	-	-	-	4	-	-	-	-
Total	34	2064:02	3	28	3	143	913	0	.865	4.16

== Rankings ==
Poll	Week																											
Poll	Pre	1	2	3	4	5	6	7	8	9	10	11	12	13	14	15	16	17	18	19	20	21	22	23	24	25	26	27 (Final)
USCHO.com	NR	NR	NR	NR	NR	NR	NR	NR	NR	NR	NR	NR	–	NR	NR	NR	NR	NR	NR	NR	NR	NR	NR	NR	NR	NR	–	NR
USA Hockey	NR	NR	NR	NR	NR	NR	NR	NR	NR	NR	NR	NR	–	NR	NR	NR	NR	NR	NR	NR	NR	NR	NR	NR	NR	NR	NR	NR

Note: USCHO did not release a poll in week 12 or 26.
Note: USA Hockey did not release a poll in week 12.
