= 2024–25 Omaha Mavericks men's ice hockey season =

Ice Breaker Tournament, Champion
- Conference: 4th NCHC
- Home ice: Baxter Arena

Rankings
- USCHO: NR
- USA Hockey: NR

Record
- Overall: 18–17–1
- Conference: 14–9–1
- Home: 10–8–0
- Road: 5–8–1
- Neutral: 3–1–0

Coaches and captains
- Head coach: Mike Gabinet
- Assistant coaches: Dave Noël-Bernier; Peter Aubry; Bennett Hambrook
- Captain: Nolan Krenzen
- Alternate captain(s): Harrison Israels; Griffin Ludtke; Sam Stange

The 2024–25 Omaha Mavericks men's ice hockey season was the 28th season of play for the program and 12th in the NCHC. The Mavericks represented the University of Nebraska Omaha in the 2024–25 NCAA Division I men's ice hockey season, played their home games at Baxter Arena and were coached by Mike Gabinet in his 8th season.

== Season ==
Coming into the year, Omaha was projected to be a bubble team for the NCAA tournament, as born out by their #15 ranking in the preseason poll. The team began the year with a mild surprise by winning the Ice Breaker Tournament thanks to stellar goaltending from Šimon Latkoczy, who stopped 77 shots in two overtime games. Unfortunately, over the next month the Mavericks' offense went silent. Omaha scored just 7 goals in their next 6 games, losing every match as well as their place in the rankings. Despite losing Tanner Ludtke to a long-term injury on October 25th, the team was able to recover by mid-November and end its losing streak but they found themselves in an uphill battle. To make matters worse, Latkoczy went through a rough patch in December that saw the Mavs lose to Lindenwood that dropped their PairWise ranking down into the high 40s, making it incredible difficult for the team to earn an at-large bid.

The team kicked off the second hall of its season with a solid runner-up performance in the Coachella Valley Cactus Cup and then surged up the standings over the next three weeks. January saw the Mavericks finally play like a tournament contender with the club winning 6 consecutive to finally get their record back above .500. Four of their victories came against ranked teams thanks to a seemingly revitalized Latkoczy as well as the offense getting consistent contributions from someone other than Sam Stange. The team hit a small bump at the end of the month but had themselves in a solid position heading into the final weeks of the season. With their final six game all coming against ranked opponents, the Mavericks had a tremendous opportunity to pull themselves back into the postseason race. However, the Mavericks could not keep their recent string of strong play going. After a close loss to Western Michigan, the offense vanished for several games and by the time they were able to regain their scoring stride, Omaha was well out of the running.

Their solid showing in the second half lifted the Mavs up to 4th in the standings but still left them far below the cutoff line for the tournament. With a conference title as their only path forward, the team was at least able to begin their postseason push at home against North Dakota. They opened the scoring in the first game and had a 2–1 lead at the end of the first period. UND scored twice in quick succession early in the second to turn the tables, forcing the Mavericks into desperate fight over the final 20 minutes. Despite outshooting the Hawks 17–0 in the third, Omaha was unable to find the back of the net and fell behind in the series. The rematch saw the two teams play fairly even through the first 40 minutes but Omaha was able to score twice and carry a 2–0 lead into the third. Despite playing conservatively, the Mavs surrendered three goals in the final frame, losing a second 2–3 decision to see their season come to a close.

== Departures ==
Player	Position	Nationality	Cause
Michael Abgrall	Forward	Canada	Transferred to Holy Cross
Seth Eisele	Goaltender	United States	Graduation (signed with South Carolina Stingrays)
Ray Fust	Forward	Switzerland	Transferred to Clarkson
Jesse Lansdell	Forward	Canada	Graduation (signed with Florida Everblades)
Joaquim Lemay	Defenseman	Canada	Transferred to Northeastern
Victor Mancini	Defenseman	United States	Signed professional contract (New York Rangers)
Matt Miller	Forward	United States	Graduation (signed with Lehigh Valley Phantoms)
Ty Mueller	Forward	Canada	Signed professional contract (Vancouver Canucks)
Kirby Proctor	Defenseman	Canada	Graduation (signed with Trois-Rivières Lions)
Jack Randl	Forward	United States	Graduation (signed with Bridgeport Islanders)
Nolan Sullivan	Forward	United States	Graduation (signed with Kansas City Mavericks)
Dominic Vidoli	Defenseman	United States	Graduation (signed with Ferencvárosi TC)

== Recruiting ==
Player	Position	Nationality	Age	Notes
Marcus Broberg	Defenseman	Sweden	20	Örebro, SWE
Aiden Gallacher	Defenseman	United States	24	Rochester Hills, MI; graduate transfer from Northern Michigan
Joe Gramer	Defenseman	United States	19	Moorhead, MN
Dylan Gratton	Defenseman	United States	21	Pottstown, PA; transfer from Penn State
Myles Hilman	Forward	United States	20	Blackfalds, AB
Harrison Israels	Forward	Canada	25	Mississauga, ON; graduate transfer from Alaska
Chase LaPinta	Forward	United States	20	Frisco, TX
Isaiah Norlin	Defenseman	United States	21	Minneapolis, MN
Garrett Pinoniemi	Forward	United States	23	Robbinsdale, MN; transfer from Minnesota
Kevin Reidler	Goaltender	Sweden	20	Gävle, SWE; selected 151st overall in 2022
Brady Risk	Forward	Canada	25	Medicine Hat, AB; graduate transfer from Alaska
Sam Stange	Forward	United States	23	Eau Claire, WI; graduate transfer from Wisconsin; selected 97th overall in 2020
Alexi Van Houtte-Cachero	Forward	Canada	21	Montreal, QC
Liam Watkins	Forward	Canada	20	Okotoks, AB

== Roster ==
As of September 5, 2024.

No.	Nat.	Player	Class	Pos	Height	Weight	DoB	Hometown	Previous team	NHL rights
1	(Canada)	Will Craig	Sophomore	G	6' 2" (1.88 m)	229 lb (104 kg)	2002-05-16	Ennismore, Ontario	New Mexico Ice Wolves (NAHL)	—
2	(United States)	Aiden Gallacher	Graduate	D	6' 1" (1.85 m)	205 lb (93 kg)	2000-03-20	Rochester Hills, Michigan	Northern Michigan (CCHA)	—
3	(United States)	Sam Stange (A)	Graduate	F	6' 1" (1.85 m)	208 lb (94 kg)	2001-04-20	Eau Claire, Wisconsin	Wisconsin (USHL)	DET, 97th overall 2020
5	(United States)	Joe Gramer	Freshman	D	6' 0" (1.83 m)	196 lb (89 kg)	2005-07-14	Moorhead, Minnesota	Des Moines Buccaneers (USHL)	—
6	(United States)	Zach Urdahl	Senior	F	6' 1" (1.85 m)	194 lb (88 kg)	2001-10-13	Eau Claire, Wisconsin	Wisconsin (Big Ten)	—
7	(United States)	Griffin Ludtke (A)	Junior	D	5' 10" (1.78 m)	170 lb (77 kg)	2003-02-01	Elko, Minnesota	Sioux City Musketeers (USHL)	—
8	(Sweden)	Marcus Broberg	Freshman	D	6' 0" (1.83 m)	204 lb (93 kg)	2003-10-23	Örebro, Sweden	Salmon Arm Silverbacks (BCHL)	—
9	(Canada)	Brady Risk	Graduate	F	5' 9" (1.75 m)	175 lb (79 kg)	1999-03-16	Medicine Hat, Alberta	Alaska (NCAA)	—
10	(Canada)	Jacob Guévin	Junior	D	5' 11" (1.8 m)	190 lb (86 kg)	2003-01-17	Drummondville, Quebec	Muskegon Lumberjacks (USHL)	—
12	(United States)	Nolan Krenzen (C)	Graduate	D	5' 10" (1.78 m)	187 lb (85 kg)	2001-07-13	Duluth, Minnesota	Omaha Lancers (USHL)	—
13	(Canada)	Jacob Slipec	Junior	F	5' 11" (1.8 m)	187 lb (85 kg)	2001-12-05	White Rock, British Columbia	Surrey Eagles (BCHL)	—
15	(United States)	Noah Ellis	Junior	D	6' 3" (1.91 m)	192 lb (87 kg)	2002-02-01	Urbandale, Iowa	Massachusetts (HEA)	VGK, 184th overall 2020
17	(Canada)	Alexi Van Houtte-Cachero	Freshman	F	6' 0" (1.83 m)	194 lb (88 kg)	2003-03-21	Montreal, Quebec	Sioux City Musketeers (USHL)	—
18	(Canada)	Myles Hilman	Freshman	F	5' 9" (1.75 m)	194 lb (88 kg)	2003-10-15	Blackfalds, Alberta	Waterloo Black Hawks (USHL)	—
19	(United States)	Garrett Pinoniemi	Junior	F	6' 0" (1.83 m)	170 lb (77 kg)	2001-07-15	Mound, Minnesota	Minnesota (Big Ten)	—
21	(United States)	Tyler Rollwagen	Junior	F	5' 11" (1.8 m)	194 lb (88 kg)	2001-03-20	Bloomington, Minnesota	Fargo Force (USHL)	—
22	(United States)	Jimmy Glynn	Senior	F	5' 11" (1.8 m)	175 lb (79 kg)	2000-02-24	Lemont, Illinois	Dubuque Fighting Saints (USHL)	—
23	(Canada)	Harrison Israels (A)	Graduate	F	6' 1" (1.85 m)	200 lb (91 kg)	1999-09-01	Mississauga, Ontario	Alaska (NCAA)	—
24	(United States)	Charlie Lurie	Sophomore	F	5' 11" (1.8 m)	187 lb (85 kg)	2003-03-11	Minnetonka, Minnesota	Cedar Rapids RoughRiders (USHL)	—
25	(Canada)	Cam Mitchell	Junior	F	5' 9" (1.75 m)	181 lb (82 kg)	2001-03-09	Stony Plain, Alberta	Omaha Lancers (USHL)	—
26	(United States)	Brock Bremer	Graduate	F	5' 6" (1.68 m)	151 lb (68 kg)	1999-08-26	Forest Lake, Minnesota	Lincoln Stars (USHL)	—
27	(Canada)	Liam Watkins	Freshman	F	6' 1" (1.85 m)	201 lb (91 kg)	2004-07-13	Okotoks, Alberta	Des Moines Buccaneers (USHL)	—
29	(United States)	Chase LaPinta	Freshman	F	5' 9" (1.75 m)	170 lb (77 kg)	2004-02-10	Frisco, Texas	Sioux Falls Stampede (USHL)	—
30	(Slovakia)	Šimon Latkoczy	Junior	G	5' 11" (1.8 m)	177 lb (80 kg)	2002-06-01	Trenčín, Slovakia	Madison Capitols (USHL)	—
35	(Sweden)	Kevin Reidler	Freshman	G	6' 6" (1.98 m)	203 lb (92 kg)	2004-09-02	Gävle, Sweden	Dubuque Fighting Saints (USHL)	OTT, 151st overall 2022
46	(United States)	Dylan Gratton	Junior	D	6' 0" (1.83 m)	180 lb (82 kg)	2003-02-25	Pottstown, Pennsylvania	Penn State (Big Ten)	—
64	(United States)	Isaiah Norlin	Freshman	D	6' 6" (1.98 m)	205 lb (93 kg)	2003-04-21	Minneapolis, Minnesota	West Kelowna Warriors (BCHL)	—
71	(United States)	Tanner Ludtke	Sophomore	F	6' 0" (1.83 m)	180 lb (82 kg)	2004-11-27	Elko, Minnesota	Lincoln Stars (USHL)	UTA, 81st overall 2023

== Standings ==
2024–25 National Collegiate Hockey Conference Standings
	Conference record										Overall record					
	GP	W	L	T	OTW	OTL	SW	PTS	GF	GA	GP	W	L	T	GF	GA
#1 Western Michigan †*	24	19	4	1	4	3	0	57	98	51	42	34	7	1	167	86
#16 Arizona State	24	14	9	1	2	5	1	47	91	69	37	21	14	2	136	103
#3 Denver	24	15	8	1	2	1	0	45	89	59	44	31	12	1	174	94
Omaha	24	14	9	1	1	1	1	44	82	69	36	18	17	1	105	99
#18 North Dakota	24	14	9	1	3	1	1	42	81	73	38	21	15	2	120	111
Colorado College	24	11	12	1	4	1	1	32	68	72	37	18	18	1	106	113
Minnesota Duluth	24	9	13	2	2	2	1	30	63	77	36	13	20	3	99	117
St. Cloud State	24	7	16	1	2	3	0	23	53	79	36	14	21	1	79	110
Miami	24	0	23	1	0	3	0	4	38	114	34	3	28	3	63	143
Championship: March 22, 2025 † indicates conference regular season champion (Penrose Cup) * indicates conference tournament champion (Frozen Faceoff Championship Trophy); Rankings: USCHO.com Top 20 Poll

== Schedule and results ==
Date	Time	Opponent^{#}	Rank^{#}	Site	TV	Decision	Result	Attendance	Record
Exhibition
October 5	6:07 pm	at #10 Wisconsin*	#15	Baxter Arena • Omaha, Nebraska (Exhibition)		Reidler	L 2–3 ^{OT}	5,456	
Ice Breaker Tournament
October 11	6:00 pm	vs. #14 Massachusetts*	#15	Orleans Arena • Las Vegas, Nevada (Ice Breaker Semifinal)		Latkoczy	W 3–2 ^{OT}	2,152	1–0–0
October 12	9:30 pm	vs. #5 Minnesota*	#15	Orleans Arena • Las Vegas, Nevada (Ice Breaker Championship)	BTN+	Latkoczy	W 2–1 ^{OT}	1,922	2–0–0
Regular Season
October 18	7:07 pm	Augustana*	#12	Baxter Arena • Omaha, Nebraska		Latkoczy	L 1–2	6,238	2–1–0
October 19	7:07 pm	Augustana*	#12	Baxter Arena • Omaha, Nebraska		Latkoczy	L 0–4	6,253	2–2–0
October 25	7:07 pm	at #18 Minnesota State*	#16	Mayo Clinic Health System Event Center • Mankato, Minnesota	Midco Sports+	Latkoczy	L 3–4	4,461	2–3–0
October 26	6:07 pm	at #18 Minnesota State*	#16	Mayo Clinic Health System Event Center • Mankato, Minnesota	Midco Sports+	Latkoczy	L 0–1	4,987	2–4–0
November 8	7:07 pm	#14 Western Michigan		Baxter Arena • Omaha, Nebraska		Latkoczy	L 1–2	6,683	2–5–0 (0–1–0)
November 9	7:07 pm	#14 Western Michigan		Baxter Arena • Omaha, Nebraska		Latkoczy	L 2–4	7,022	2–6–0 (0–2–0)
November 15	8:00 pm	at Arizona State		Mullett Arena • Tempe, Arizona	FOX 10	Latkoczy	W 4–2	5,157	3–6–0 (1–2–0)
November 16	6:00 pm	at Arizona State		Mullett Arena • Tempe, Arizona	FOX 10	Reidler	L 2–3	5,025	3–7–0 (1–3–0)
November 22	7:07 pm	Miami		Baxter Arena • Omaha, Nebraska		Latkoczy	W 3–0	6,225	4–7–0 (2–3–0)
November 23	7:07 pm	Miami		Baxter Arena • Omaha, Nebraska		Latkoczy	W 8–1	7,294	5–7–0 (3–3–0)
December 6	7:30 pm	at #9 St. Cloud State		Herb Brooks National Hockey Center • St. Cloud, Minnesota	Fox 9+	Latkoczy	W 4–3 ^{OT}	2,797	6–7–0 (4–3–0)
December 7	6:00 pm	at #9 St. Cloud State		Herb Brooks National Hockey Center • St. Cloud, Minnesota	Fox 9+	Latkoczy	L 2–5	2,932	6–8–0 (4–4–0)
December 13	7:07 pm	Lindenwood*		Baxter Arena • Omaha, Nebraska		Latkoczy	L 2–3	3,225	6–9–0
December 14	7:07 pm	Lindenwood*		Baxter Arena • Omaha, Nebraska		Reidler	W 2–1	6,159	7–9–0
December 29	2:00 pm	Manitoba*		Baxter Arena • Omaha, Nebraska (Exhibition)		Reidler	W 5–0	6,455	
Coachella Valley Cactus Cup
January 3	5:30 pm	vs. Holy Cross*		Acrisure Arena • Thousand Palms, California (Cactus Cup Semifinal)		Reidler	W 4–3	—	8–9–0
January 4	9:00 pm	vs. #10 Massachusetts Lowell*		Acrisure Arena • Thousand Palms, California (Cactus Cup Championship)		Latkoczy	L 2–3	—	8–10–0
January 10	7:07 pm	#13 Colorado College		Baxter Arena • Omaha, Nebraska		Latkoczy	W 5–2	6,475	9–10–0 (5–4–0)
January 11	7:07 pm	#13 Colorado College		Baxter Arena • Omaha, Nebraska		Latkoczy	W 3–1	6,955	10–10–0 (6–4–0)
January 17	6:05 pm	at Miami		Steve Cady Arena • Oxford, Ohio		Latkoczy	W 4–1	1,777	11–10–0 (7–4–0)
January 18	6:05 pm	at Miami		Steve Cady Arena • Oxford, Ohio		Reidler	W 3–1	2,129	12–10–0 (8–4–0)
January 24	7:07 pm	#17 St. Cloud State		Baxter Arena • Omaha, Nebraska		Latkoczy	W 6–3	7,107	13–10–0 (9–4–0)
January 25	7:07 pm	#17 St. Cloud State		Baxter Arena • Omaha, Nebraska		Latkoczy	W 3–1	7,411	14–10–0 (10–4–0)
January 31	8:00 pm	at #5 Denver		Magness Arena • Denver, Colorado		Latkoczy	T 3–3 ^{SOW}	6,493	14–10–1 (10–4–1)
February 1	7:00 pm	at #5 Denver		Magness Arena • Denver, Colorado		Latkoczy	L 2–11	6,657	14–11–1 (10–5–1)
February 7	7:07 pm	Minnesota Duluth		Baxter Arena • Omaha, Nebraska		Latkoczy	W 4–1	7,443	15–11–1 (11–5–1)
February 8	7:07 pm	Minnesota Duluth		Baxter Arena • Omaha, Nebraska		Latkoczy	W 5–2	7,019	16–11–1 (12–5–1)
February 14	6:00 pm	at #3 Western Michigan	#20	Lawson Arena • Kalamazoo, Michigan		Latkoczy	L 4–5 ^{OT}	2,823	16–12–1 (12–6–1)
February 15	5:00 pm	at #3 Western Michigan	#20	Lawson Arena • Kalamazoo, Michigan		Latkoczy	L 1–6	3,580	16–13–1 (12–7–1)
February 28	7:07 pm	#12 Arizona State		Baxter Arena • Omaha, Nebraska		Latkoczy	L 1–4	7,802	16–14–1 (12–8–1)
March 1	7:07 pm	#12 Arizona State		Baxter Arena • Omaha, Nebraska		Reidler	W 4–2	7,802	17–14–1 (13–8–1)
March 7	7:07 pm	at #18 North Dakota		Ralph Engelstad Arena • Grand Forks, North Dakota	CBSSN	Latkoczy	L 1–3	11,572	17–15–1 (13–9–1)
March 8	6:07 pm	at #18 North Dakota		Ralph Engelstad Arena • Grand Forks, North Dakota	Midco	Latkoczy	W 7–3	11,611	18–15–1 (14–9–1)
NCHC Tournament
March 14	7:00 pm	#17 North Dakota*	#20	Baxter Arena • Omaha, Nebraska (NCHC Quarterfinal Game 1)		Latkoczy	L 2–3	6,068	18–16–1
March 15	7:00 pm	#17 North Dakota*	#20	Baxter Arena • Omaha, Nebraska (NCHC Quarterfinal Game 2)		Latkoczy	L 2–3	—	18–17–1
*Non-conference game. ^{#}Rankings from USCHO.com Poll. All times are in Central Time. Source:

== Scoring statistics ==
Name	Position	Games	Goals	Assists	Points	PIM
Sam Stange	RW	36	16	18	34	20
Brady Risk	LW/RW	36	13	12	25	30
Harrison Israels	C	34	10	15	25	14
Zach Urdahl	LW	33	12	10	22	6
Cam Mitchell	LW	33	8	12	20	10
Jacob Guévin	D	36	7	13	20	10
Jimmy Glynn	F	35	8	7	15	14
Tyler Rollwagen	F	36	3	12	15	26
Dylan Gratton	D	36	2	12	14	6
Griffin Ludtke	D	36	2	11	13	21
Myles Hilman	F	25	6	6	12	4
Brock Bremer	LW	36	4	8	12	20
Nolan Krenzen	D	36	0	11	11	18
Charlie Lurie	F	20	4	6	10	28
Marcus Broberg	D	27	1	8	9	22
Chase LaPinta	F	19	3	1	4	4
Liam Watkins	F	15	2	2	4	0
Noah Ellis	D	26	1	3	4	8
Jacob Slipec	F	33	1	3	4	24
Joe Gramer	D	33	0	4	4	4
Garrett Pinoniemi	C	29	1	2	3	8
Tanner Ludtke	C	8	1	1	2	2
Aiden Gallacher	D	6	0	1	1	2
Isaiah Norlin	D	16	0	1	1	2
Will Craig	G	1	0	0	0	0
Alexi Van Houtte-Cachero	C/RW	4	0	0	0	4
Kevin Reidler	G	8	0	0	0	0
Šimon Latkoczy	G	31	0	0	0	0
Bench	–	–	–	–	–	12
Total			105	179	284	319

== Goaltending statistics ==
Name	Games	Minutes	Wins	Losses	Ties	Goals against	Saves	Shut outs	SV %	GAA
Will Craig	1	10:04	0	0	0	0	4	0	1.000	0.00
Šimon Latkoczy	31	1771:30	14	16	1	80	952	1	.922	2.71
Kevin Reidler	8	371:59	4	1	0	17	196	0	.920	2.74
Empty Net	-	20:54	-	-	-	2	-	-	-	-
Total	36	2174:27	18	17	1	99	1152	1	.921	2.73

== Rankings ==
Poll	Week																											
Poll	Pre	1	2	3	4	5	6	7	8	9	10	11	12	13	14	15	16	17	18	19	20	21	22	23	24	25	26	27 (Final)
USCHO.com	15	15	12	16	RV	RV	RV	NR	NR	NR	NR	NR	–	NR	NR	RV	RV	RV	RV	20	RV	RV	RV	20	RV	RV	–	RV
USA Hockey	17	16	12	19	RV	RV	RV	NR	NR	NR	NR	NR	–	NR	NR	RV	RV	RV	RV	20	RV	RV	RV	RV	RV	NR	NR	NR

Note: USCHO did not release a poll in week 12 or 26.
Note: USA Hockey did not release a poll in week 12.

== Awards and honors ==
Player	Award	Ref
Šimon Latkoczy	NCHC Goaltender of the Year	
Šimon Latkoczy	All-NCHC First Team	
Sam Stange	All-NCHC Second Team	

== 2025 NHL entry draft ==
Round	Pick	Player	NHL team
7	198	Jeremy Loranger ^{†}	Columbus Blue Jackets

† incoming freshman
