= 2024–25 St. Cloud State Huskies men's ice hockey season =

- Conference: 8th NCHC
- Home ice: Herb Brooks National Hockey Center

Rankings
- USCHO: NR
- USA Hockey: NR

Record
- Overall: 14–21–1
- Conference: 7–16–1
- Home: 9–8–1
- Road: 5–13–0

Coaches and captains
- Head coach: Brett Larson
- Assistant coaches: R. J. Enga; Clark Kuster; Eric Rud
- Captain: Josh Luedtke
- Alternate captain(s): Nick Portz; Ryan Rosborough; Mason Salquist

The 2024–25 St. Cloud State Huskies men's ice hockey season was the 90th season of play for the program, the 28th at the Division I level and 12th in the NCHC. The Huskies represented St. Cloud State University in the 2024–25 NCAA Division I men's ice hockey season, played their home games at Herb Brooks National Hockey Center and were coached by Brett Larson in his 7th season.

== Season ==
At the start of the season, it was looking like St. Cloud State was putting together another strong year that would result in a tournament berth. The team was scoring consistently, if modest, despite losing four of their top five scorers from a year before. Isak Posch was providing a rock-solid performance in goal that led the team to an outstanding record by Thanksgiving. With the team being ranked in the top 10 at that point, the Huskies were winding down the first half of their schedule when disaster struck. Posch was injured before their match with Omaha on December 6 and later ruled out for 10-12 weeks. The ill news didn't immediately doom the team's season, since they had already banked several quality wins, but they would have to be extra vigilant to survive the next few months without their starting goaltender.

Gavin Enright and James Gray were called upon to fill the role but the Huskies quickly discovered that neither was up to the task. St. Cloud lost three of four games heading into the break but the backup netminders would have a couple of weeks to gather themselves and try to hold on while they waited for Posch to return. Enright began the second half of the year with two good outings, but then his performance fell flat and the team was suddenly allowing at least 5 goals per game. Gray got his turn as a starter at the end of January and, like Enright, played reasonably well for a few games before his goals against ballooned. By the beginning of February, the team had lost so much that not only had they dropped out of the polls but their record was underwater and the Huskies had almost no chance to make the tournament without a miracle finish.

It came as welcome news when Posch return from a ruptured tendon in his big toe and returned to the ice against Western Michigan. After taking a couple of games to knock off the rust, Posch was looking like his old self once more but the Huskies were in a very bad position by then. With St. Cloud 5 games below .500 at the end of the regular season, the team was sitting near the middle of the national rankings and was well out of the race for an at-large bid. With a conference championship as their only path towards the tournament, the team was then faced with an uphill slough since they had finished eighth in the NCHC standings and would likely have to run through a gauntlet of tough opponents.

St. Cloud State began its postseason race against Western Michigan and, from the opening faceoff, the Huskies didn't look like they had a chance. WMU came out skating and bombarded Posch with 17 shots in each of the first two periods. The sophomore did what he could but the puck found its way behind him five times, leaving the Huskies mediocre offense with a herculean task over the final 20 minutes. The team was unable to break through a solid wall of Broncos in the third but once and St. Cloud headed into the rematch with their season on the line. This time they were able to restrict Western to fewer shots with a stronger performance on the back end, but that resulted in the team hardly getting a shot on goal for long stretches in the game. Even so, WMU was able to score three goals before St. Cloud could get its first near the middle of the third. After exchanging goals, the Huskies were still down by 3 past the midway point of the period. In desperation, Posch was pulled with nearly 7 minutes still on the clock but the ploy worked and the Huskies cut into the lead with Verner Miettinen's goal near the 6-minute mark. Posch was pulled once more when the team was able to get into the Broncos end but this time it was Western who took advantage. An empty-net goal sapped all the hope out of the Huskies as they realized that their season was just about over. One additional empty-netter finished off the night and sent St. Cloud State home early.

== Departures ==
Player	Position	Nationality	Cause
Dylan Anhorn	Defenseman	Canada	Graduation (signed with Manitoba Moose)
Dominic Basse	Goaltender	United States	Graduate transfer to St. Lawrence
Tynan Ewart	Defenseman	Canada	Transferred to Northern Michigan
Kyler Kupka	Forward	Canada	Graduation (signed with South Carolina Stingrays)
Veeti Miettinen	Forward	Finland	Graduation (signed with KalPa)
Joey Molenaar	Forward	United States	Graduate transfer to Minnesota Duluth
Zachary Okabe	Forward	Canada	Graduation (signed with Cleveland Monsters)
Jack Peart	Defenseman	United States	Signed professional contract (Minnesota Wild)

== Recruiting ==
Player	Position	Nationality	Age	Notes
Austin Burnevik	Forward	United States	19	Ham Lake, MN; selected 182nd overall in 2024
Thor Byfuglien	Defenseman	United States	21	Roseau, MN
Daimon Gardner	Forward	Canada	20	Eagle Lake, ON; transfer from Clarkson; selected 112nd overall in 2022
Colin Ralph	Defenseman	United States	18	Maple Grove, MN; selected 48th overall in 2024
Gavyn Thoreson	Forward	United States	19	Andover, MN
Dana Wallace	Forward	United States	20	Boulder, CO
Josh Zinger	Defenseman	Canada	23	Red Deer, AB; transfer from Northern Michigan

== Roster ==
As of September 16, 2024.

No.	Nat.	Player	Class	Pos	Height	Weight	DoB	Hometown	Previous team	NHL rights
2	(Sweden)	Karl Falk	Senior	D	6' 3" (1.91 m)	205 lb (93 kg)	2000-01-20	Västerås, Sweden	Alaska (NCAA)	—
4	(United States)	Colin Ralph	Freshman	D	6' 5" (1.96 m)	227 lb (103 kg)	2005-10-04	Maple Grove, Minnesota	Shattuck-Saint Mary's (USHS–MN)	STL, 48th overall 2024
5	(Canada)	Warren Clark	Sophomore	D	6' 3" (1.91 m)	195 lb (88 kg)	2004-08-31	Riverside, Ontario	Steinbach Pistons (MJHL)	TBL, 179th overall 2023
6	(United States)	Mason Reiners	Junior	D	6' 1" (1.85 m)	195 lb (88 kg)	2001-05-03	Edina, Minnesota	Waterloo Black Hawks (USHL)	—
7	(United States)	Jack Reimann	Sophomore	F	6' 0" (1.83 m)	195 lb (88 kg)	2002-10-10	Ham Lake, Minnesota	Des Moines Buccaneers (USHL)	—
8	(United States)	Ocean Wallace	Freshman	F	6' 3" (1.91 m)	216 lb (98 kg)	2003-10-31	Boulder, Colorado	Austin Bruins (NAHL)	—
11	(United States)	Grant Ahcan	Junior	F	5' 10" (1.78 m)	160 lb (73 kg)	2002-05-18	Savage, Minnesota	Cedar Rapids RoughRiders (USHL)	—
12	(Canada)	Ryan Rosborough (A)	Junior (RS)	F	6' 3" (1.91 m)	190 lb (86 kg)	2000-05-24	Mt. Brydges, Ontario	South Shore Kings (NCDC)	—
13	(Canada)	Tyson Gross	Sophomore	F	6' 3" (1.91 m)	185 lb (84 kg)	2002-09-23	Calgary, Alberta	Cedar Rapids RoughRiders (USHL)	—
14	(Canada)	Josh Zinger	Junior	D	5' 11" (1.8 m)	185 lb (84 kg)	2001-08-05	Red Deer, Alberta	Northern Michigan (CCHA)	—
15	(United States)	Barrett Hall	Sophomore	F	6' 0" (1.83 m)	170 lb (77 kg)	2003-12-29	Apple Valley, Minnesota	Green Bay Gamblers (USHL)	SEA, 164th overall 2022
16	(United States)	Mason Salquist (A)	Senior	F	5' 8" (1.73 m)	165 lb (75 kg)	2000-03-21	Grand Forks, North Dakota	Fargo Force (USHL)	—
17	(Canada)	Ethan AuCoin	Junior	F	6' 1" (1.85 m)	170 lb (77 kg)	2002-08-10	Calgary, Alberta	Lloydminster Bobcats (AJHL)	—
18	(United States)	Nick Portz (A)	Senior	F	5' 11" (1.8 m)	180 lb (82 kg)	2000-05-15	St. Cloud, Minnesota	North Dakota (NCHC)	—
19	(Finland)	Verner Miettinen	Sophomore	F	5' 11" (1.8 m)	172 lb (78 kg)	2003-04-07	Espoo, Finland	Fargo Force (USHL)	—
20	(United States)	Jack Rogers	Junior	F	6' 1" (1.85 m)	190 lb (86 kg)	2002-09-23	East Northport, New York	Steinbach Pistons (MJHL)	—
21	(United States)	Josh Luedtke (C)	Senior	D	5' 9" (1.75 m)	175 lb (79 kg)	2000-09-29	Minnetonka, Minnesota	Des Moines Buccaneers (USHL)	—
23	(United States)	Austin Burnevik	Freshman	F	6' 4" (1.93 m)	201 lb (91 kg)	2005-01-03	Ham Lake, Minnesota	Madison Capitols (USHL)	ANA, 182nd overall 2024
25	(United States)	Thor Byfuglien	Sophomore	D	5' 11" (1.8 m)	174 lb (79 kg)	2003-07-14	Roseau, Minnesota	Chicago Steel (USHL)	—
26	(United States)	Cooper Wylie	Junior	D	6' 1" (1.85 m)	195 lb (88 kg)	2001-10-26	Stillwater, Minnesota	Waterloo Black Hawks (USHL)	—
27	(Canada)	Kaleb Tiessen	Sophomore	D	6' 5" (1.96 m)	210 lb (95 kg)	2002-06-03	Leamington, Ontario	Maryland Black Bears (NAHL)	—
28	(United States)	Gavyn Thoreson	Freshman	F	5' 8" (1.73 m)	179 lb (81 kg)	2004-10-30	Andover, Minnesota	Waterloo Black Hawks (USHL)	—
30	(Sweden)	Isak Posch	Sophomore	G	6' 3" (1.91 m)	210 lb (95 kg)	2002-01-03	Umeå, Sweden	Minnesota Wilderness (NAHL)	—
33	(Canada)	James Gray	Sophomore (RS)	G	6' 3" (1.91 m)	195 lb (88 kg)	2002-05-24	Toronto, Ontario	North York Rangers (OJHL)	—
34	(Canada)	Adam Ingram	Junior	F	6' 1" (1.85 m)	175 lb (79 kg)	2003-10-14	West St. Paul, Manitoba	Youngstown Phantoms (USHL)	NSH, 82nd overall 2022
44	(United States)	Gavin Enright	Graduate	G	6' 2" (1.88 m)	170 lb (77 kg)	1999-08-26	Farmington, Minnesota	Bemidji State (CCHA)	—
81	(Canada)	Daimon Gardner	Sophomore	F	6' 5" (1.96 m)	205 lb (93 kg)	2004-01-18	Eagle Lake, Ontario	Clarkson (ECAC)	VAN, 112nd overall 2022

== Standings ==
2024–25 National Collegiate Hockey Conference Standings
	Conference record										Overall record					
	GP	W	L	T	OTW	OTL	SW	PTS	GF	GA	GP	W	L	T	GF	GA
#1 Western Michigan †*	24	19	4	1	4	3	0	57	98	51	42	34	7	1	167	86
#16 Arizona State	24	14	9	1	2	5	1	47	91	69	37	21	14	2	136	103
#3 Denver	24	15	8	1	2	1	0	45	89	59	44	31	12	1	174	94
Omaha	24	14	9	1	1	1	1	44	82	69	36	18	17	1	105	99
#18 North Dakota	24	14	9	1	3	1	1	42	81	73	38	21	15	2	120	111
Colorado College	24	11	12	1	4	1	1	32	68	72	37	18	18	1	106	113
Minnesota Duluth	24	9	13	2	2	2	1	30	63	77	36	13	20	3	99	117
St. Cloud State	24	7	16	1	2	3	0	23	53	79	36	14	21	1	79	110
Miami	24	0	23	1	0	3	0	4	38	114	34	3	28	3	63	143
Championship: March 22, 2025 † indicates conference regular season champion (Penrose Cup) * indicates conference tournament champion (Frozen Faceoff Championship Trophy); Rankings: USCHO.com Top 20 Poll

== Schedule and results ==
Date	Time	Opponent^{#}	Rank^{#}	Site	TV	Decision	Result	Attendance	Record
Exhibition
October 5	6:00 pm	#6 Minnesota*	#16	Herb Brooks National Hockey Center • St. Cloud, Minnesota (Exhibition)	Fox 9+		L 1–5		
Regular Season
October 6	5:00 pm	at St. Thomas*	#16	St. Thomas Ice Arena • Mendota Heights, Minnesota	Midco Sports+	Posch	W 1–0	861	1–0–0
October 11	7:30 pm	Bemidji State*	#16	Herb Brooks National Hockey Center • St. Cloud, Minnesota	Fox 9+	Posch	W 4–3	–	2–0–0
October 12	6:00 pm	at Bemidji State*	#16	Sanford Center • Bemidji, Minnesota	Midco Sports+	Posch	W 3–2	2,279	3–0–0
October 18	6:00 pm	at #10 Michigan*	#13	Yost Ice Arena • Ann Arbor, Michigan	BTN+	Posch	L 0–3	5,800	3–1–0
October 19	6:00 pm	at #10 Michigan*	#13	Yost Ice Arena • Ann Arbor, Michigan	BTN+	Posch	W 4–0	5,800	4–1–0
October 25	7:00 pm	Augustana*	#12	Herb Brooks National Hockey Center • St. Cloud, Minnesota	Fox 9+	Posch	W 4–3	3,067	5–1–0
October 26	5:00 pm	Augustana*	#12	Herb Brooks National Hockey Center • St. Cloud, Minnesota		Posch	W 2–1	4,163	6–1–0
November 1	7:30 pm	#2 Boston College*	#10	Herb Brooks National Hockey Center • St. Cloud, Minnesota	Fox 9+	Posch	L 1–4	3,462	6–2–0
November 2	6:00 pm	#2 Boston College*	#10	Herb Brooks National Hockey Center • St. Cloud, Minnesota	Fox 9+	Posch	L 1–2	—	6–3–0
November 8	7:30 pm	Miami	#12	Herb Brooks National Hockey Center • St. Cloud, Minnesota	Fox 9+	Posch	W 3–2 ^{OT}	—	7–3–0 (1–0–0)
November 9	6:00 pm	Miami	#12	Herb Brooks National Hockey Center • St. Cloud, Minnesota	Fox 9+	Posch	W 3–1	3,278	8–3–0 (2–0–0)
November 22	8:00 pm	at #7 Colorado College	#11	Ed Robson Arena • Colorado Springs, Colorado	SOCO CW	Posch	W 3–2	3,858	9–3–0 (3–0–0)
November 23	7:00 pm	at #7 Colorado College	#11	Ed Robson Arena • Colorado Springs, Colorado		Posch	L 0–1	3,821	9–4–0 (3–1–0)
December 6	7:30 pm	Omaha	#9	Herb Brooks National Hockey Center • St. Cloud, Minnesota	Fox 9+	Gray	L 3–4 ^{OT}	2,797	9–5–0 (3–2–0)
December 7	6:00 pm	Omaha	#9	Herb Brooks National Hockey Center • St. Cloud, Minnesota	Fox 9+	Enright	W 5–2	2,932	10–5–0 (4–2–0)
December 13	7:00 pm	at #16 North Dakota	#9	Ralph Engelstad Arena • Grand Forks, North Dakota	Midco Sports	Enright	L 0–2	11,455	10–6–0 (4–3–0)
December 14	6:00 pm	at #16 North Dakota	#9	Ralph Engelstad Arena • Grand Forks, North Dakota	Midco Sports	Enright	L 3–4 ^{OT}	11,588	10–7–0 (4–4–0)
December 29	4:00 pm	St. Thomas*	#12	Herb Brooks National Hockey Center • St. Cloud, Minnesota	Fox 9+	Enright	W 2–1	3,531	11–7–0
January 10	7:00 pm	at Minnesota Duluth	#10	AMSOIL Arena • Duluth, Minnesota		Enright	L 0–2	5,012	11–8–0 (4–5–0)
January 11	6:00 pm	at Minnesota Duluth	#10	AMSOIL Arena • Duluth, Minnesota		Enright	L 2–5	5,512	11–9–0 (4–6–0)
January 17	7:30 pm	#13 Arizona State	#15	Herb Brooks National Hockey Center • St. Cloud, Minnesota	Fox 9+, Fox 10 Xtra	Enright	L 3–6	3,245	11–10–0 (4–7–0)
January 18	6:00 pm	#13 Arizona State	#15	Herb Brooks National Hockey Center • St. Cloud, Minnesota	Fox 9+	Enright	L 3–5	3,697	11–11–0 (4–8–0)
January 24	7:00 pm	at Omaha	#17	Baxter Arena • Omaha, Nebraska		Enright	L 3–6	7,107	11–12–0 (4–9–0)
January 25	7:00 pm	at Omaha	#17	Baxter Arena • Omaha, Nebraska		Gray	L 1–3	7,411	11–13–0 (4–10–0)
January 31	7:30 pm	#16 North Dakota		Herb Brooks National Hockey Center • St. Cloud, Minnesota	Fox 9+	Gray	T 3–3 ^{SOL}	4,106	11–13–1 (4–10–1)
February 1	6:00 pm	#16 North Dakota		Herb Brooks National Hockey Center • St. Cloud, Minnesota	Fox 9+	Gray	L 2–6	5,124	11–14–1 (4–11–1)
February 7	6:00 pm	at #4 Western Michigan		Lawson Arena • Kalamazoo, Michigan		Enright	L 0–4	3,425	11–15–1 (4–12–1)
February 8	5:00 pm	at #4 Western Michigan		Lawson Arena • Kalamazoo, Michigan		Posch	L 1–6	3,572	11–16–1 (4–13–1)
February 21	7:30 pm	#20 Colorado College		Herb Brooks National Hockey Center • St. Cloud, Minnesota	Fox 9+	Posch	L 3–4	3,225	11–17–1 (4–14–1)
February 22	6:00 pm	#20 Colorado College		Herb Brooks National Hockey Center • St. Cloud, Minnesota	Fox 9+	Posch	W 4–2	3,567	12–17–1 (5–14–1)
February 28	8:00 pm	at #6 Denver		Magness Arena • Denver, Colorado		Posch	L 1–3	6,417	12–18–1 (5–15–1)
March 1	7:00 pm	at #6 Denver		Magness Arena • Denver, Colorado		Posch	W 2–1	6,518	13–18–1 (6–15–1)
March 7	7:30 pm	Minnesota Duluth		Herb Brooks National Hockey Center • St. Cloud, Minnesota	Fox 9+	Posch	W 3–2 ^{OT}	3,511	14–18–1 (7–15–1)
March 8	6:00 pm	Minnesota Duluth		Herb Brooks National Hockey Center • St. Cloud, Minnesota	Fox 9+	Posch	L 2–3	5,018	14–19–1 (7–16–1)
NCHC Tournament
March 14	6:00 pm	at #3 Western Michigan*		Lawson Arena • Kalamazoo, Michigan (NCHC Quarterfinal Game 1)		Posch	L 2–6	3,553	14–20–1
March 15	5:00 pm	at #3 Western Michigan*		Lawson Arena • Kalamazoo, Michigan (NCHC Quarterfinal Game 2)		Posch	L 2–6	3,456	14–21–1
*Non-conference game. ^{#}Rankings from USCHO.com Poll. All times are in Central Time. Source:

== Scoring statistics ==
Name	Position	Games	Goals	Assists	Points	PIM
Austin Burnevik	LW/RW	35	13	15	28	8
Tyson Gross	RW	36	9	16	25	37
Barrett Hall	C	34	7	15	22	6
Verner Miettinen	C	36	8	13	21	10
Daimon Gardner	C	32	5	9	14	14
Grant Ahcan	LW/RW	36	5	6	11	16
Gavyn Thoreson	F	36	6	4	10	36
Josh Zinger	D	33	4	4	8	16
Josh Luedtke	D	36	3	5	8	10
Cooper Wylie	D	26	2	6	8	24
Adam Ingram	C	29	2	6	8	12
Colin Ralph	D	35	1	7	8	20
Mason Salquist	F	36	3	4	7	16
Nick Portz	F	33	4	1	5	12
Ethan Aucoin	F	23	3	2	5	6
Warren Clark	D	20	1	3	4	0
Jack Reimann	F	35	1	3	4	18
Karl Falk	D	28	0	4	4	6
Thor Byfuglien	D	24	1	2	3	4
Mason Reiners	D	36	0	3	3	4
Ryan Rosborough	F	28	1	0	1	4
Jack Rogers	F	4	0	1	1	2
Dana Wallace	F	2	0	0	0	4
Kaleb Tiessen	D	11	0	0	0	2
James Gray	G	6	0	0	0	0
Gavin Enright	G	10	0	0	0	0
Isak Posch	G	22	0	0	0	0
Total			79	129	208	287

== Goaltending statistics ==
Name	Games	Minutes	Wins	Losses	Ties	Goals against	Saves	Shut outs	SV %	GAA
Isak Posch	22	1277:11	12	10	0	51	613	2	.923	2.40
Gavin Enright	12	591:16	2	8	0	32	269	0	.894	3.25
James Gray	8	284:38	0	3	0	16	121	0	.883	3.37
Empty Net	-	29:05	-	-	-	11	-	-	-	-
Total	36	2182:03	14	21	1	110	1003	2	.892	3.02

== Rankings ==
Poll	Week																											
Poll	Pre	1	2	3	4	5	6	7	8	9	10	11	12	13	14	15	16	17	18	19	20	21	22	23	24	25	26	27 (Final)
USCHO.com	16	16	13	12	10	12	12	11	9	9	9	12	–	11	10	15	17	RV	RV	NR	NR	NR	NR	NR	NR	NR	–	NR
USA Hockey	16	15	13	14	10	14	11т	10	9	9	9	10	–	11	10	14	17	RV	NR	NR	NR	NR	NR	NR	NR	NR	NR	NR

Note: USCHO did not release a poll in week 12 or 26.
Note: USA Hockey did not release a poll in week 12.

== Awards and honors ==
Player	Award	Ref
Colin Ralph	NCHC All-Rookie Team	
Austin Burnevik	NCHC All-Rookie Team	

== 2025 NHL entry draft ==
Round	Pick	Player	NHL team
7	214	Nolan Roed ^{†}	Colorado Avalanche

† incoming freshman
