= Anthony Noreen =

American ice hockey player

Current position
- Title: Head coach
- Team: Miami
- Conference: NCHC
- Record: 21–44–5

Biographical details
- Born: February 11, 1983 (age 43); Chicago, Illinois, U.S.
- Education: Wisconsin–Stevens Point

Coaching career (HC unless noted)
- 2011–2015: Youngstown Phantoms
- 2015–2017: Orlando Solar Bears
- 2017–2024: Tri-City Storm
- 2024–present: Miami

Head coaching record
- Overall: 21–44–5 (.336)

Anthony Noreen (born February 11, 1983) is an American ice hockey coach, and current head coach of the Miami RedHawks men's ice hockey team.

== Coaching career ==
Noreen began his coaching career as an assistant coach at his Alma Mater University of Wisconsin–Stevens Point. After coaching for three years with the Pointers, on August 10, 2011, he was named the head coach for the Youngstown Phantoms of the United States Hockey League (USHL). On April 30, 2012, the Phantoms signed Noreen to a two-year contract extension. His 2014–15 Youngstown team set a USHL record with a 17-game win streak en route to claiming the Anderson Cup for the first time in franchise history. The Phantoms ranked first in goals scored (223), power play goals (65), and shorthanded goals (16), and allowed the third fewest goals (166). Following the season he was named USHL Coach of the Year. During his four years with the Phantoms he led the team to a 126–99–10–9 overall record.

=== Orlando Solar Bears ===
On June 30, 2015, he was named head coach for the Orlando Solar Bears of the ECHL. During his two seasons with the Solar Bears he led the team to a 38–35–4–6 overall record. On November 14, 2016, he was relieved of his duties as head coach.

=== Tri-City Storm ===
On May 26, 2017, he was named the head coach for the Tri-City Storm of the USHL. His 2018–19 Storm team finished the season with a 45–12–3–2 record and won the Anderson Cup. They set a new team record with 232 goals scored and 45 wins. Following the season he was named USHL Coach of the Year. On November 19, 2019, he was promoted to President of Hockey Operations. On April 14, 2020, Noreen signed a two-year contract extension with the Storm through the 2023–24 season. His 2021–22 Storm team finished the season with a 47–11–3–1 record, won a second consecutive Western Conference Regular Season Championship and the third Anderson Cup Championship in franchise history. The Storm tied a USHL record with 98 points in the standings, and broke the franchise record with 47 wins. They set a team record for goals scored (260), assists (470), points (729), and powerplay goals (83). Following the season he was again named USHL Coach of the Year. His finished his tenure with the Storm with a 236–126–24–18 overall record, making him the winningest coach in franchise history. His Storm teams qualified for the playoffs in each of his seven seasons as head coach.

=== Miami University ===
On April 1, 2024, Noreen was named head coach for the Miami RedHawks men's ice hockey team. During his first year he led Miami to a 3–28–3 record. During the 2025–26 season, he led the team to an 18–16–2 record. They matched the largest single-season improvement in regular-season wins in program and finished with a winning record for the first time since 2015. On April 3, 2026, he signed a two-year contract extension with Miami through the 2031–32 season.

=== Team USA ===
Noreen was an assistant coach of the U.S. Junior Select Team at the World Junior A Challenge in 2017, where he helped the team to a silver medal. He then served as the head coach at the World Junior A Challenge in 2018 and won a gold medal and again in 2019 and won a bronze medal.

== Head coaching record ==
=== College ===
Record table
Season	Team	Overall	Conference	Standing	Postseason
Miami RedHawks (NCHC) (2024–present)
2024–25	Miami	3–28–3	0–23–1	9th	
2025–26	Miami	18–16–2	9–13–2	7th	NCHC first round
Miami:		21–44–5	9–36–3		
Total:		21–44–5			
National champion Postseason invitational champion Conference regular season champion Conference regular season and conference tournament champion Division regular season champion Division regular season and conference tournament champion Conference tournament champion
