= Jared Wright (ice hockey) =

American Ice Hockey Player

- Born: November 22, 2002 (age 23) Burnsville, Minnesota
- Height: 6 ft 1 in (185 cm)
- Weight: 178 lb (81 kg; 12 st 10 lb)
- Position: Right Wing
- Shoots: Right
- NHL team (P) Cur. team: Los Angeles Kings; Ontario Reign (AHL)
- NHL draft: 169th overall, 2022; Los Angeles Kings
- Playing career: 2025–present

Jared Wright (born November 22, 2002) is an American professional ice hockey right winger for the Ontario Reign in the American Hockey League (AHL) while under contract to the Los Angeles Kings of the National Hockey League (NHL). He was selected by the Kings in the sixth round, 169th overall, of the 2022 NHL Entry Draft.

== Playing career ==
Wright played junior hockey with the Omaha Lancers of the United States Hockey League (USHL) during the 2021–22 season. He recorded 34 points in 59 games and was named the team's rookie of the year.

He later committed to the University of Denver, where he played NCAA Division I hockey with the Denver Pioneers for three years. During his collegiate career, Wright appeared in 122 games and totaled 54 points. In 2024, he scored the game-winning goal in the national championship game as Denver captured its tenth NCAA title.

Wright was drafted by the Los Angeles Kings in the sixth round, 169th overall, in the 2022 NHL Entry Draft. He signed a two-year entry-level contract with the organization on April 14, 2025.

Following time with the Ontario Reign of the American Hockey League (AHL), Wright made his NHL debut with the Kings during the 2025–26 season.

== Career statistics ==
			Regular season					Playoffs
Season	Team	League	GP	G	A	Pts	PIM	GP	G	A	Pts	PIM
2017–18	MN Kings 15U AAA	MNBEL 14U	14	2	3	5	—	—	—	—	—	—
2018–19	Saint Thomas Academy	USHS-MN	25	4	8	12	2	5	0	0	0	0
2018–19	Blue Army U16	16U AAA	20	6	8	14	0	—	—	—	—	—
2019–20	Saint Thomas Academy	USHS-MN	25	6	18	24	0	6	2	1	3	0
2019–20	Team MAP South Hockey	UMHSEHL	18	5	9	14	2	—	—	—	—	—
2020–21	Saint Thomas Academy	USHS-MN	21	16	22	38	9	—	—	—	—	—
2020–21	Team MAP South Hockey	UMHSEHL	18	15	10	25	0	3	1	2	3	0
2020–21	Minot Minotauros	NAHL	6	0	0	0	0	—	—	—	—	—
2021–22	Omaha Lancers	USHL	59	15	19	34	6	4	1	2	3	0
2022–23	University of Denver	NCAA	34	8	4	12	2	—	—	—	—	—
2023–24	University of Denver	NCAA	44	15	10	25	8	—	—	—	—	—
2024–25	University of Denver	NCAA	44	9	8	17	6	—	—	—	—	—
2024–25	Ontario Reign	AHL	3	0	1	1	0	2	0	0	0	0
2025–26	Los Angeles Kings	NHL	23	0	4	4	4	4	0	0	0	0
2025–26	Ontario Reign	AHL	54	17	13	30	11	5	0	1	1	0
NHL totals			23	0	4	4	4	4	0	0	0	0
