= Artem Shlaine =

American ice hockey player (born 2002)

- Born: 7 March 2002 (age 24) Moscow, Russia
- Height: 6 ft 1 in (185 cm)
- Weight: 165 lb (75 kg; 11 st 11 lb)
- Position: Centre
- Shoots: Left
- NHL team (P) Cur. team: Dallas Stars; Texas Stars (AHL)
- NHL draft: 130th overall, 2020; New Jersey Devils
- Playing career: 2025–present

Artem Shlaine (born 7 March 2002) is a Russian professional ice hockey centre for the Texas Stars in the American Hockey League (AHL) while under contract to the Dallas Stars of the National Hockey League (NHL).

== Early life ==
Shlaine was born to Dmitri and Ekaterina Shlaine, and has a brother, Daniel. He attended Shattuck-Saint Mary's in Faribault, Minnesota. He was drafted in the fifth round, 130th overall, by the New Jersey Devils in the 2020 NHL entry draft.

== Playing career ==
=== College ===
On 13 May 2020, Shlaine committed to play college ice hockey at Connecticut, after originally committing to play at Boston University. During the 2020–21 season, in his freshman season, he recorded one goal and eight assists in 23 games. He led the Huskies and Hockey East in face-off win percentage at 60.2 percent, winning 162 face-offs. During the 2021–22 season, in his sophomore season, he recorded seven goals and ten assists in 36 games. He led his team in face-off win percentage at 57.6%.

On 17 June 2022, he transferred to Northern Michigan. During the 2022–23 season, in his junior season, he recorded 11 goals and 21 assists in 38 games. During the 2023–24 season, in his senior season, he recorded ten goals and 13 assists in 27 games. He led the Wildcats with 315 face-off wins and led the CCHA with a face-off win percentage of 58.8%. On 10 November 2023, in a game against Lake Superior State, he recorded his first career hat-trick.

On 10 April 2024, he transferred to Arizona State. He missed the first six games of the season due to injury. During the 2024–25 season, as a graduate student, he recorded 17 goals and 21 assists in 31 games. Following the season he was named to the All-NCHC First Team and AHCA West Second Team All-American. He became only the second player in program history to earn All-American honors. He was also named a finalist for the NCHC Player of the Year and NCHC Forward of the Year.

=== Professional ===
On 31 March 2025, Shlaine signed an Amateur tryout (ATO) with the Texas Stars of the AHL.

After a season with their AHL affiliate, Shlaine secured an NHL contract after he was signed to a one-year, two-way contract with the Dallas Stars for the 2026–27 season on July 1, 2026.

== Career statistics ==
			Regular season					Playoffs
Season	Team	League	GP	G	A	Pts	PIM	GP	G	A	Pts	PIM
2018–19	Sioux Falls Stampede	USHL	—	—	—	—	—	2	0	0	0	0
2019–20	Muskegon Lumberjacks	USHL	6	2	1	3	0	—	—	—	—	—
2020–21	University of Connecticut	HE	23	1	8	9	16	—	—	—	—	—
2021–22	University of Connecticut	HE	36	7	10	17	6	—	—	—	—	—
2022–23	Northern Michigan University	CCHA	38	11	21	32	18	—	—	—	—	—
2023–24	Northern Michigan University	CCHA	27	10	13	23	23	—	—	—	—	—
2024–25	Arizona State University	NCHC	31	17	21	38	16	—	—	—	—	—
2024–25	Texas Stars	AHL	6	0	1	1	0	—	—	—	—	—
2025–26	Texas Stars	AHL	67	19	19	38	12	5	3	1	4	2
AHL totals			73	19	20	39	12	5	3	1	4	2

== Awards and honors ==
Award	Year
College
All-NCHC First Team	2025
AHCA West Second Team All-American	2025
