= Herb Brooks National Hockey Center =

Hockey arena in Minnesota

Coordinates: 45°32′48″N 94°09′08″W

Brooks Center

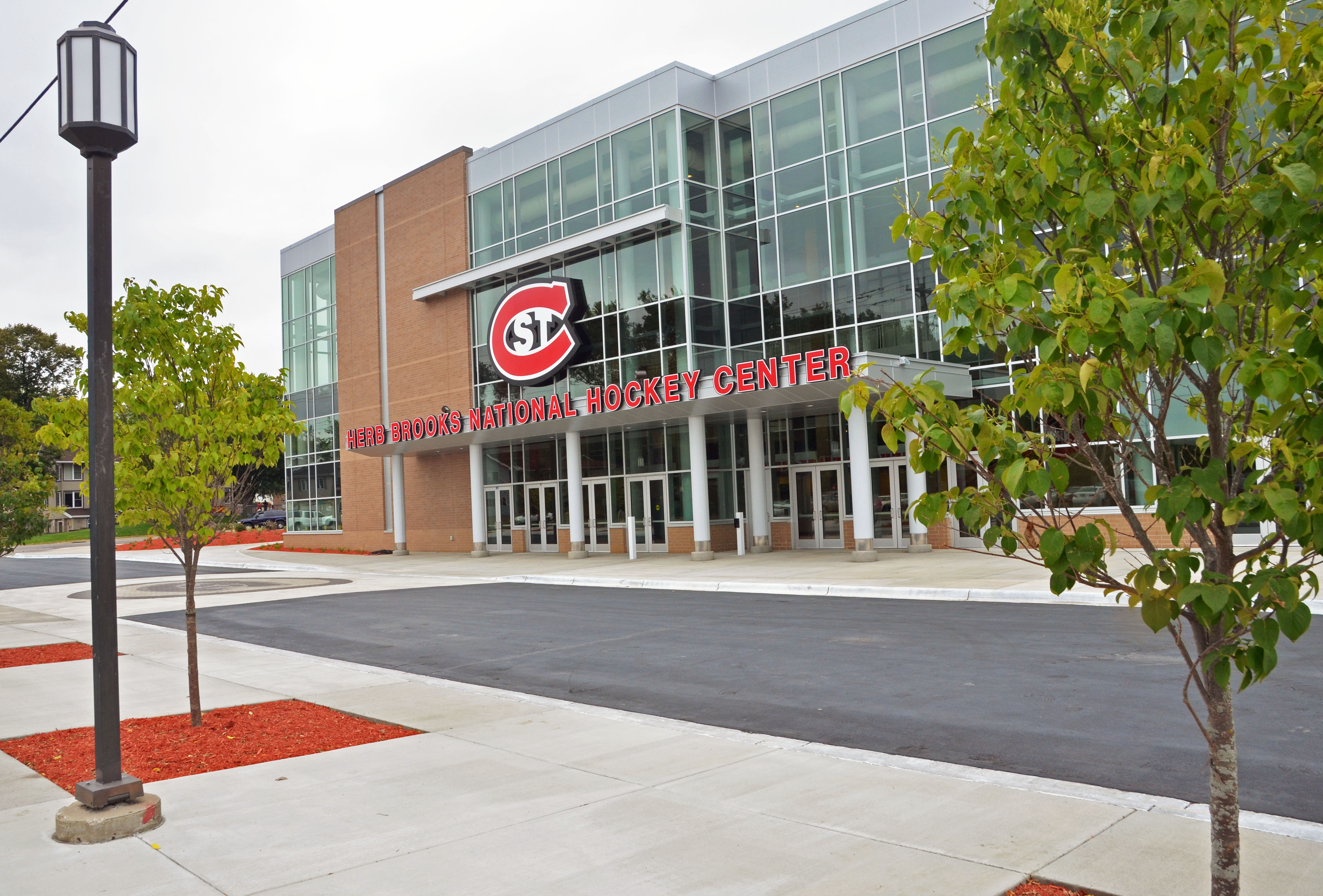
- Exterior view of the venue in 2013
- Interactive map of Brooks Center
- Full name: Herb Brooks National Hockey Center
- Former names: National Hockey Center (1989–2008); National Hockey and Event Center (2008–2013)
- Location: One Herb Brooks Way; St. Cloud, MN 56301
- Owner: St. Cloud State University
- Operator: St. Cloud State University
- Capacity: up to 8,000 (Ice Hockey)
- Type: Ice hockey arena
- Surface: 200' x 100' sheets (Ice Hockey)
- Current use: Ice hockey

Construction
- Opened: December 1989; 36 years ago
- Architect: JLG Architects (2013 Addition)

Tenants
- St. Cloud State Huskies Men's Hockey (NCAA) (1989–present); St. Cloud State Huskies Women's Hockey (NCAA) (1998–present); St. John's Johnnies Men's Hockey (NCAA) (1990–present)

Website
- stcloudstate.edu/herb-brooks-nhc

The Herb Brooks National Hockey Center, also known as the Brooks Center, is a 6,000+ seat ice hockey arena that can seat up to 8,000 in St. Cloud, Minnesota. It is home to the St. Cloud State University Huskies men's & women's ice hockey teams, and the Saint John's University Johnnies ice hockey team. The main rink is named for the late university President Brendan J. McDonald, who advocated the team's move to Division I hockey. The arena consists of a lower and upper deck on the sides the ice. The west end features a few seats, while east contains no seating.

Although it is recorded as having a 5,159 seating capacity, Husky hockey games often draw crowds of more than 6,000. In 2024, Donald Trump held a rally in the arena, requiring an expansion to 8,000 seats indoors and thousands more outdoors. It is also a concert venue, with a capacity of up to 7,763. Graduation ceremonies have also been held at the arena.

The Brooks Arena was once regarded, by a visiting team, as a difficult place to play in the WCHA and NCHC. The notorious "Dog Pound" (St. Cloud's Student Section) regularly attends games.

In 2013, the arena was renamed in honor of former St. Cloud State, University of Minnesota, and Miracle on Ice hockey coach Herb Brooks. The same year, the National Hockey Center reopened after an extensive addition and renovation by JLG Architects, which included a new atrium and entrance, west-end seating, expanded suites, club level seating, wider concourses, a new team store, and improved training facilities. In 2019, St. Cloud State received further funding for the project via a $600,000 campaign, which allowed them to finish building a high quality strength and conditioning area; this was originally part of the 2013 renovation, but initial funding fell just short of finishing it at the time.

In 2022, St. Cloud State received $1.3 million in gifts to significantly improve the fan experience at the Brooks Center; these funds were used to replace the analog video scoreboards with the latest in digital technology, add new video boards above the entrances from the concourse in the rink, and to improve the audio and acoustics of the building.

== See also ==
- Herb Brooks Arena
