= 2024–25 Minnesota State Mavericks men's ice hockey season =

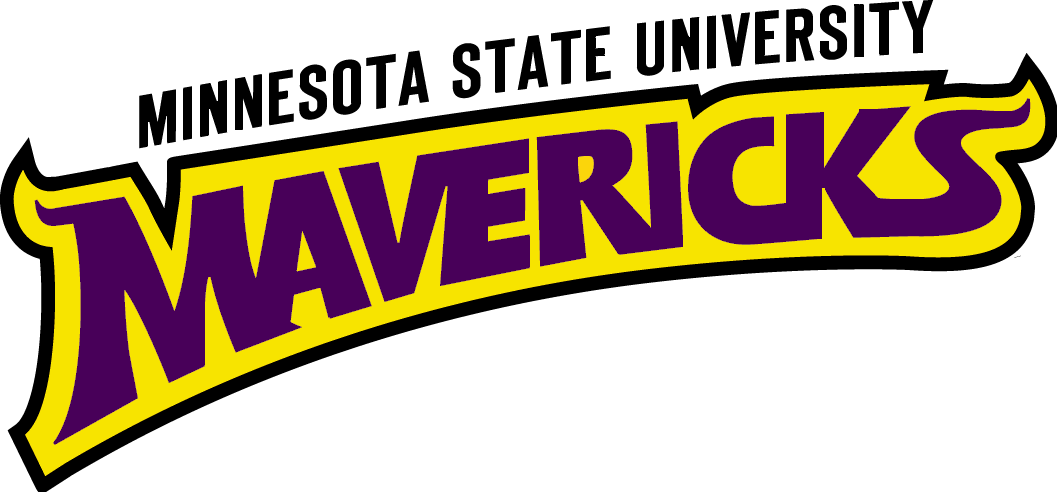

CCHA, Champion CCHA Tournament, Champion NCAA Tournament, Regional Semifinals
- Conference: 1st CCHA
- Home ice: Mayo Clinic Health System Event Center

Rankings
- USCHO: #14
- USA Hockey: #14

Record
- Overall: 27–9–3
- Conference: 18–5–3
- Home: 17–4–3
- Road: 10–4–0
- Neutral: 0–1–0

Coaches and captains
- Head coach: Luke Strand
- Assistant coaches: Troy G. Ward; Keith Paulsen; Cory McCracken
- Captain: Josh Groll
- Alternate captain(s): Zack Krajnik; Jordan Power; Mason Wheeler

The 2024–25 Minnesota State Mavericks men's ice hockey season was the 56th season of play for the program, 29th at the Division I level, and 4th in the CCHA. The Mavericks represented Minnesota State University, Mankato in the 2024–25 NCAA Division I men's ice hockey season, played their home games at Mayo Clinic Health System Event Center, and were coached by Luke Strand in his 2nd season.

== Season ==
The Mavericks entered Strand's second season with modest expectations. The team had lost its top two scorers from the previous season in Sam Morton and Lucas Sowder; the defense saw two departures but added one of MSU's two NHL draft picks, Luke Ashton. In goal, Alex Tracy was given complete control of the net after Keenan Rancier's transfer.

The early part of the season saw the team split the first three weekends. While some of that was due to the strength of their opponents, the offense had some difficulty in finding its consistency through the first few months. The team relied heavily on Tracy's performance in goal; he never allowed more than 3 goals in a game and often led the team to victory despite an off night from the forwards. Tracy was helped mightily by the strong defense in front of him; Ashton, along with Campbell Cichosz and Mason Wheeler, were prolific shot-stoppers, combining for more than 170 blocks for the season and limited opponents to less than 27 shots per game.

The low goals against allowed the Mavericks to back several wins early while the offense worked to fix its issues and had Minnesota State atop the standings by the beginning of December. By that time, Rhett Pitlick, a Minnesota transfer, had taken over as the team's offensive leader and helped the Mavericks post a 14–4–2 record for the first half of the season. Entering the winter break, Minnesota State was ranked #12 in both the polls and the national rankings and was in a good position to earn an at-large bid for the NCAA tournament.

The Mavericks, however, struggled in January. The team began the second half of their schedule with a loss to one of the worst teams in the country, Northern Michigan. While they were able to salvage the weekend and earn a split, the rest of the month was no different. Hot and cold scoring caused the team to split the next three series as well. While the losses weren't catastrophic for Minnesota State's position in the standings, they cause the team to drop below the cut-line for the national tournament. Compounding this, the CCHA was one of the lowest-ranked conferences this season; this meant that MSU would receive only a small bonus to their ranking by winning conference matches but would take a large hit through any losses. By the start of February, the team's tournament chances had narrowed considerably and, even though they didn't suffer a single loss in their final seven games, they barely moved in the PairWise rankings.

=== Playoffs ===
By the start of the CCHA tournament, Minnesota State sat at #17 in the national rankings despite possessing a 23–8–3 record. MSU knew that a conference championship was the only way the team could return to the national tournament, Entering their series with Lake Superior State, Tracy's outstanding play during the regular season continued into the postseason, but it was Zach Krajnik who proved to be the hero of the first game. In his final playoff run with the Mavs, Krajnik entered the game with just 1 goal on the season but he tripled that total in the first period. The defense held the Lakers back during the second period and kept the lead for the rest of the game. After Lake Superior State pulled their goaltender, Krajnik was sent onto the ice and he finished off the game with the only hat-trick of his college career.

The rematch saw Lake Superior twice take the lead but Krajnik tied the match just 15 seconds after the second LSSU marker. Evan Murr, the all-around star on the Mavericks' blue line, gave his team their first lead shortly afterwards and then joined the rest of the team in slowing down the Lakers and stopping any further goals from being scored. The win sent MSU into the semifinal round and brought them to 15th in the rankings. While 16 teams did qualify for the tournament, MSU was not yet above the cut line because both the CCHA and Atlantic Hockey America champions would be guaranteed entry and, since no other team in either conference was ranked ahead of the Mavericks, they needed to be ranked at least 14th to earn an at-large bid.

Bemidji State was next for Minnesota State. Zach Krajnik opened the scoring with his 5th goal of the postseason while Alex Tracy blocked every opposing shot. MSU scored three more times and progressed to the championship match. While the team was still one game away from a championship, the Mavericks became the first team in the country to receive an automatic bid thanks to a confluence of events. St. Thomas was the team's opponent in the championship game. However, because the Tommies had recently transitioned from Division III, they were not yet eligible for the NCAA tournament. This meant that even if Minnesota State did not win the conference championship, they would still receive the CCHA's automatic qualifier. This did not stop the team from playing hard in the match and the two teams exchanged leads in the second period. Krajnik again got onto the scoresheet, this time with an assist, but it was Murr's goal midway through the third period that proved to be the winning shot. The defenseman was named Tournament MVP for his efforts and sent the Mavericks to the nationals.

Due to the team's poor strength of schedule, Minnesota state was rated 14th in the field of 16, however, due to seeding requirements they were moved into the Fargo regional and set against NCHC champion Western Michigan. MSU was at a disadvantage, as the Broncos had the #2 offense in the nation. However, the Mavericks were able to respond with the nation's top defense. The two clashed in a physical game that saw few penalties, however, WMU scored early in the second on a power play. Minnesota State eventually managed to break through early in the third thanks to Kaden Bohlsen finishing off a combination from the two top playoff performers, Krajnik and Murr. Western kept MSU hemmed in their own end for long stretches in the third and overtime, but Tracy and the defense held. In the second overtime, Luc Wilson nearly won it for the Mavericks after a turnover in the Broncos' end but he had the puck knocked off his stick at the last moment. Western scored the winning goal a few minutes later on a scramble in front.

== Departures ==
Player	Position	Nationality	Cause
Tanner Edwards	Forward	United States	Graduate transfer to Alaska Anchorage
Connor Gregga	Forward	Canada	Graduate transfer to Long Island
Brandon Koch	Defenseman	United States	Graduation (retired)
Tony Malinowski	Defenseman	United States	Graduation (signed with Reading Royals)
Sam Morton	Forward	United States	Graduation (signed with Calgary Flames)
Keenan Rancier	Goaltender	Canada	Transferred to Vermont
Lucas Sowder	Forward	United States	Graduation (signed with Pioneers Vorarlberg)
Jordan Steinmetz	Forward	United States	Graduation (signed with Eaters Limburg)

== Recruiting ==
Player	Position	Nationality	Age	Notes
Cade Alami	Defenseman	United States	23	Bedford, NY; transfer from Arizona State
Luke Ashton	Defenseman	Canada	19	North Vancouver, BC; selected 165th overall in 2024
Luigi Benincasa	Forward	Canada	21	Edmonton, AB; transfer from Ferris State
Ralfs Bergmanis	Defenseman	Latvia	22	Liepāja, LAT; transfer from Vermont
Jacob Bonkowski	Forward	Canada	21	Richmond, BC
Rhett Pitlick	Forward	United States	24	Plymouth, MN; transfer from Minnesota
Eli Pulver	Goaltender	Canada	21	Vancouver, BC
Sam Rice	Forward	United States	20	Prior Lake, MN
Matthew Syverson	Goaltender	United States	21	Apple Valley, MN; transfer from Lindenwood
Fin Williams	Forward	Canada	21	North Vancouver, BC; transfer from Notre Dame

== Roster ==
As of August 24, 2024.

No.	Nat.	Player	Class	Pos	Height	Weight	DoB	Hometown	Previous team	NHL rights
4	(Canada)	Brett Moravec	Sophomore	F	5' 10" (1.78 m)	176 lb (80 kg)	2003-02-26	Airdrie, Alberta	Penticton Vees (BCHL)	—
5	(United States)	Mason Wheeler (A)	Junior	D	6' 1" (1.85 m)	195 lb (88 kg)	2001-09-29	Inver Grove Heights, Minnesota	Tri-City Storm (USHL)	—
7	(Canada)	Luc Wilson	Junior	F	5' 8" (1.73 m)	170 lb (77 kg)	2001-11-22	Duncan, British Columbia	Penticton Vees (BCHL)	—
8	(United States)	Campbell Cichosz	Junior	D	6' 0" (1.83 m)	174 lb (79 kg)	2001-08-23	Albert Lea, Minnesota	Anchorage Wolverines (NAHL)	—
9	(Canada)	Luigi Benincasa	Sophomore	F	5' 9" (1.75 m)	159 lb (72 kg)	2002-10-07	Edmonton, Alberta	Ferris State (CCHA)	—
10	(United States)	Evan Murr	Sophomore	D	5' 10" (1.78 m)	178 lb (81 kg)	2003-02-27	Stillwater, Minnesota	Sioux Falls Stampede (USHL)	—
11	(United States)	Tyler Haskins	Junior	F	6' 1" (1.85 m)	170 lb (77 kg)	2003-07-07	Rochester, Minnesota	Denver (NCHC)	—
12	(United States)	Josh Groll (C)	Graduate	F	5' 11" (1.8 m)	182 lb (83 kg)	2001-08-09	San Diego, California	Michigan (Big Ten)	—
13	(Canada)	Jordan Power (A)	Sophomore	D	6' 1" (1.85 m)	187 lb (85 kg)	2001-07-31	Ottawa, Ontario	Lincoln Stars (USHL)	—
14	(United States)	Kade Nielsen	Sophomore	F	5' 9" (1.75 m)	170 lb (77 kg)	2002-08-06	Burnsville, Minnesota	Chippewa Steel (NAHL)	—
15	(United States)	Adam Eisele	Junior	F	6' 1" (1.85 m)	190 lb (86 kg)	2001-07-11	Lake Elmo, Minnesota	Penticton Vees (BCHL)	—
16	(Canada)	Jacob Bonkowski	Freshman	F	6' 1" (1.85 m)	170 lb (77 kg)	2003-08-25	Richmond, British Columbia	Coquitlam Express (BCHL)	—
17	(Canada)	Luke Ashton	Freshman	D	6' 7" (2.01 m)	231 lb (105 kg)	2005-01-21	North Vancouver, British Columbia	Langley Rivermen (BCHL)	CBJ, 165th overall 2024
18	(United States)	Jakob Stender	Sophomore	F	5' 11" (1.8 m)	185 lb (84 kg)	2002-08-07	Alexandria, Minnesota	Fargo Force (USHL)	—
19	(United States)	Will Hillman	Sophomore	F	6' 2" (1.88 m)	178 lb (81 kg)	2000-11-22	Blaine, Minnesota	Youngstown Phantoms (USHL)	—
21	(Canada)	Fin Williams	Sophomore	F	6' 1" (1.85 m)	186 lb (84 kg)	2003-04-21	North Vancouver, British Columbia	Notre Dame (Big Ten)	—
22	(Canada)	Steven Bellini	Senior	D	5' 11" (1.8 m)	171 lb (78 kg)	2000-05-23	Sault Ste. Marie, Ontario	Tri-City Storm (USHL)	—
23	(United States)	Cade Alami	Senior	F	6' 7" (2.01 m)	212 lb (96 kg)	2001-03-13	Bedford, New York	Arizona State (NCAA)	—
24	(United States)	Zach Krajnik (A)	Graduate	F	5' 11" (1.8 m)	174 lb (79 kg)	1999-05-13	Eagle River, Alaska	Kenai River Brown Bears (NAHL)	—
25	(United States)	Brenden Olson	Senior	F	6' 1" (1.85 m)	170 lb (77 kg)	2000-10-18	Eau Claire, Wisconsin	Sioux City Musketeers (USHL)	—
26	(United States)	Kaden Bohlsen	Senior (RS)	F	6' 3" (1.91 m)	192 lb (87 kg)	2001-01-10	Willmar, Minnesota	Fargo Force (USHL)	—
27	(United States)	Sam Rice	Freshman	F	5' 8" (1.73 m)	163 lb (74 kg)	2003-12-31	Prior Lake, Minnesota	Madison Capitols (USHL)	—
28	(United States)	Brian Carrabes	Junior	F	5' 10" (1.78 m)	170 lb (77 kg)	2001-08-01	North Andover, Massachusetts	Sioux City Musketeers (USHL)	—
30	(Canada)	Eli Pulver	Freshman	G	6' 1" (1.85 m)	165 lb (75 kg)	2003-03-02	Vancouver, British Columbia	Salmon Arm Silverbacks (BCHL)	—
31	(United States)	Matthew Syverson	Sophomore	G	6' 4" (1.93 m)	185 lb (84 kg)	2003-04-22	Apple Valley, Minnesota	Lindenwood (NCAA)	—
32	(United States)	Andrew Miller	Senior	G	6' 0" (1.83 m)	177 lb (80 kg)	2000-02-10	Boulder, Colorado	Fargo Force (USHL)	—
33	(United States)	Alex Tracy	Junior	G	6' 0" (1.83 m)	187 lb (85 kg)	2001-05-04	Chicago, Illinois	Sioux City Musketeers (USHL)	—
39	(Latvia)	Ralfs Bergmanis	Junior	D	5' 10" (1.78 m)	175 lb (79 kg)	2002-03-13	Liepāja, Latvia	Vermont (HEA)	—
72	(United States)	Rhett Pitlick	Senior	F	5' 10" (1.78 m)	165 lb (75 kg)	2001-02-07	Plymouth, Minnesota	Minnesota (Big Ten)	MTL, 131st overall 2019

== Standings ==
2024–25 Central Collegiate Hockey Association standings
	Conference record											Overall record					
	GP	W	L	T	OTW	OTL	SW	PTS	PCT ^	GF	GA	GP	W	L	T	GF	GA
#14 Minnesota State †*	26	18	5	3	3	1	1	56	.718	77	37	39	27	9	3	113	58
Augustana	16	9	5	2	1	1	1	30	.625	48	37	35	18	13	4	97	75
St. Thomas	26	13	9	4	1	1	1	42	.564	76	66	38	19	14	5	111	101
Bowling Green	26	12	10	4	2	3	2	43	.551	69	63	36	18	14	4	90	85
Michigan Tech	26	12	11	3	1	1	1	40	.513	75	69	36	16	17	3	95	96
Ferris State	26	12	13	1	1	0	0	36	.462	74	81	36	13	20	3	89	128
Bemidji State	26	10	12	4	3	1	4	36	.462	63	78	38	15	18	5	93	114
Lake Superior State	26	10	15	1	0	4	0	35	.449	71	76	36	12	22	2	93	115
Northern Michigan	26	4	20	2	1	1	2	16	.205	42	88	34	5	27	2	55	115
Championship: March 21, 2025 † indicates conference regular-season champion (MacNaughton Cup) * indicates conference tournament champion (Mason Cup)^ Because Augustana played a transition schedule of 16 games against conference opponents, winning percentage was used to determine conference position. Rankings: USCHO.com Top 20 Poll

== Schedule and results ==
Date	Time	Opponent^{#}	Rank^{#}	Site	TV	Decision	Result	Attendance	Record
Regular Season
October 4	6:07 pm	at #7 Michigan*		Yost Ice Arena • Ann Arbor, Michigan		Tracy	W 5–2	5,274	1–0–0
October 5	5:07 pm	at #7 Michigan*		Yost Ice Arena • Ann Arbor, Michigan		Tracy	L 1–4	5,207	1–1–0
October 11	7:07 pm	Merrimack*	#19	Mayo Clinic Health System Event Center • Mankato, Minnesota	Midco Sports+	Tracy	L 0–1	4,005	1–2–0
October 12	7:07 pm	Merrimack*	#19	Mayo Clinic Health System Event Center • Mankato, Minnesota	Midco Sports+	Tracy	W 4–1	4,053	2–2–0
October 18	7:07 pm	#5 North Dakota*	#20	Mayo Clinic Health System Event Center • Mankato, Minnesota	Midco Sports+	Tracy	L 2–3	4,912	2–3–0
October 19	6:07 pm	#5 North Dakota*	#20	Mayo Clinic Health System Event Center • Mankato, Minnesota	Midco Sports+	Tracy	W 3–0	5,042	3–3–0
October 25	7:07 pm	#16 Omaha*	#18	Mayo Clinic Health System Event Center • Mankato, Minnesota	Midco Sports+	Tracy	W 4–3	4,461	4–3–0
October 26	6:07 pm	#16 Omaha*	#18	Mayo Clinic Health System Event Center • Mankato, Minnesota	Midco Sports+	Tracy	W 1–0	4,987	5–3–0
November 1	7:07 pm	at Bemidji State	#16	Sanford Center • Bemidji, Minnesota	Midco Sports+	Tracy	L 0–1	1,671	5–4–0 (0–1–0)
November 2	6:07 pm	at Bemidji State	#16	Sanford Center • Bemidji, Minnesota	Midco Sports+	Tracy	W 2–1	2,064	6–4–0 (1–1–0)
November 8	7:07 pm	at St. Thomas	#16	St. Thomas Ice Arena • Mendota Heights, Minnesota	Midco Sports+	Tracy	W 5–3	1,082	7–4–0 (2–1–0)
November 9	6:07 pm	St. Thomas	#16	Mayo Clinic Health System Event Center • Mankato, Minnesota	Midco Sports+	Tracy	T 1–1 ^{SOW}	4,463	7–4–1 (2–1–1)
November 15	7:07 pm	Northern Michigan	#16	Mayo Clinic Health System Event Center • Mankato, Minnesota	Midco Sports+	Tracy	W 3–0	4,100	8–4–1 (3–1–1)
November 16	6:07 pm	Northern Michigan	#16	Mayo Clinic Health System Event Center • Mankato, Minnesota	Midco Sports+	Tracy	T 1–1 ^{SOL}	4,557	8–4–2 (3–1–2)
November 22	6:07 pm	at Michigan Tech	#17	MacInnes Student Ice Arena • Houghton, Michigan	Midco Sports+	Tracy	W 5–2	2,770	9–4–2 (4–1–2)
November 23	5:07 pm	at Michigan Tech	#17	MacInnes Student Ice Arena • Houghton, Michigan	Midco Sports+	Tracy	W 3–1	2,810	10–4–2 (5–1–2)
December 6	7:07 pm	Bowling Green	#15	Mayo Clinic Health System Event Center • Mankato, Minnesota	Midco Sports+	Tracy	W 4–1	3,779	11–4–2 (6–1–2)
December 7	6:07 pm	Bowling Green	#15	Mayo Clinic Health System Event Center • Mankato, Minnesota	Midco Sports+	Tracy	W 3–2 ^{OT}	3,982	12–4–2 (7–1–2)
December 13	7:07 pm	Lake Superior State	#12	Mayo Clinic Health System Event Center • Mankato, Minnesota	Midco Sports+	Tracy	W 2–1	3,836	13–4–2 (8–1–2)
December 14	6:07 pm	Lake Superior State	#12	Mayo Clinic Health System Event Center • Mankato, Minnesota	Midco Sports+	Tracy	W 3–2 ^{OT}	3,863	14–4–2 (9–1–2)
January 10	6:07 pm	at Northern Michigan	#12	Berry Events Center • Marquette, Michigan	Midco Sports+	Tracy	L 2–3	2,436	14–5–2 (9–2–2)
January 11	5:07 pm	at Northern Michigan	#12	Berry Events Center • Marquette, Michigan	Midco Sports+	Tracy	W 6–1	2,581	15–5–2 (10–2–2)
January 17	7:07 pm	Michigan Tech	#12	Mayo Clinic Health System Event Center • Mankato, Minnesota	Midco Sports+	Tracy	W 5–2	4,279	16–5–2 (11–2–2)
January 18	6:07 pm	Michigan Tech	#12	Mayo Clinic Health System Event Center • Mankato, Minnesota	Midco Sports+	Tracy	L 0–1 ^{OT}	4,825	16–6–2 (11–3–2)
January 24	6:07 pm	at Ferris State	#14	Ewigleben Arena • Big Rapids, Michigan	Midco Sports+	Tracy	L 0–2	1,875	16–7–2 (11–4–2)
January 25	5:07 pm	at Ferris State	#14	Ewigleben Arena • Big Rapids, Michigan	Midco Sports+	Tracy	W 7–2	1,956	17–7–2 (12–4–2)
January 31	7:07 pm	St. Thomas	#15	Mayo Clinic Health System Event Center • Mankato, Minnesota	Midco Sports+	Tracy	L 2–3	4,694	17–8–2 (12–5–2)
February 1	6:07 pm	at St. Thomas	#15	St. Thomas Ice Arena • Mendota Heights, Minnesota	Midco Sports+	Tracy	W 3–2 ^{OT}	1,078	18–8–2 (13–5–2)
February 7	7:07 pm	#17 Augustana	#15	Mayo Clinic Health System Event Center • Mankato, Minnesota	Midco Sports+	Tracy	W 4–1	4,162	19–8–2 (14–5–2)
February 8	6:07 pm	#17 Augustana	#15	Mayo Clinic Health System Event Center • Mankato, Minnesota	Midco Sports+	Tracy	W 2–1	4,717	20–8–2 (15–5–2)
February 21	6:07 pm	at Lake Superior State	#15	Taffy Abel Arena • Sault Ste. Marie, Michigan	Midco Sports+	Tracy	W 4–0	892	21–8–2 (16–5–2)
February 22	5:07 pm	at Lake Superior State	#15	Taffy Abel Arena • Sault Ste. Marie, Michigan	Midco Sports+	Tracy	W 4–1	—	22–8–2 (17–5–2)
February 28	7:07 pm	Bemidji State	#14	Mayo Clinic Health System Event Center • Mankato, Minnesota	Midco Sports+	Tracy	T 1–1 ^{SOL}	4,497	22–8–3 (17–5–3)
March 1	6:07 pm	Bemidji State	#14	Mayo Clinic Health System Event Center • Mankato, Minnesota	Midco Sports+	Pulver	W 5–1	4,908	23–8–3 (18–5–3)
CCHA Tournament
March 7	7:07 pm	Lake Superior State*	#14	Mayo Clinic Health System Event Center • Mankato, Minnesota (CCHA Quarterfinal Game 1)	Midco Sports+	Tracy	W 4–1	—	24–8–3
March 8	6:07 pm	Lake Superior State*	#14	Mayo Clinic Health System Event Center • Mankato, Minnesota (CCHA Quarterfinal Game 2)	Midco Sports+	Tracy	W 3–2	3,627	25–8–3
March 15	7:07 pm	Bemidji State*	#15	Mayo Clinic Health System Event Center • Mankato, Minnesota (CCHA Semifinal)	Midco Sports+	Tracy	W 4–0	3,557	26–8–3
March 21	7:07 pm	St. Thomas*	#15	Mayo Clinic Health System Event Center • Mankato, Minnesota (CCHA Championship)	Midco Sports+	Tracy	W 4–2	4,538	27–8–3
NCAA Tournament
March 27	4:00 pm	vs. #3 Western Michigan*	#14	Scheels Arena • Fargo, North Dakota (Regional Semifinal)	ESPNU	Tracy	L 1–2 ^{2OT}	4,817	27–9–3
*Non-conference game. ^{#}Rankings from USCHO.com Poll. All times are in Central Time. Source:

== NCAA tournament ==
March 27, 2025; 4:00 pm	(1) Western Michigan	2–1 (2OT) (0–0, 1–0, 0–1, 0–0, 1–0)	(4) Minnesota State	Scheels Arena; Attendance: 4,817

Game reference

Hampton Slukynsky
Goalies
Alex Tracy
Referees:
Jim Curtin
Jeremy Tufts
Linesmen:
Kevin Briganti
Nick Briganti

(Michaels) Liam Valente (13) – PP – 20:48	1–0
	1–1	41:51 – Kaden Bohlsen (12) (Krajnik, Murr)
(Nehring, Valente) Grant Slukynsky (10) – GW – 87:14	2–1

2 min
Penalties
4 min
44
Shots
29

Game summary
The game started with a bang as both teams laid big hits on one another. The temperature cooled down a bit after the first minute but both squads skated up and down the ice as they looked for an early goal. During one such rush, WMU was able to turn the puck over in the Mavericks' end and, in reply, Jordan Power was called for tripping when he tried to prevent an open shot at his goal. Western had one of the best power plays in the country but MSU was able to match with a stelar kill. The few shots that made it through to Alex Tracy weren't too dangerous and Minnesota State was able to survive. The Mavericks turned defense to offense and immediately went on the attack. They were able to get a 3-on-2 but the Bronco defenders were able to limit them to a sharp-angle shot from the wall. Chances came fast and furious for both sides but both netminders looked to be on their respective games. A heavy hit by Campbell Cichosz on Owen Michaels in the corner looked to stun the Western forward but the Broncos were still able to tilt the ice towards the Mavericks' end in the middle of the period. Minnesota State was able to counter after WMU iced the puck but the Mavericks missed on a couple of passing plays and never ended up with a decent shot on goal. The fast and physical play continued and both benches called for penalties but the referees allowed play to continue. With about 6 minutes to go, MSU got on another odd-man rush but saw the opportunity go for naught when the play was blown dead for offsides. Minnesota State continued to let chances melt down and get low-percentage chances on goal but the continual puck possession in the WMU end prevented the Broncos from getting anything going in the later half of the period. The first real scoring opportunity came with two and half minutes left when Evan Murr launched an off-balance point shot that was deflected en route and just barely stopped by Hampton Slukynsky. Despite the up and down action, neither team took any real risks during the period until the waning seconds. Alex Bump was able to sneak past the MSU defense and streak in on Tracy. However, just as he was going to shoot, Adam Eisele slashed his stick and was called for a minor penalty. The first 16 seconds of the man-advantage did not produce any results with the rest being held over to the start of the second.

Western swiftly got the puck into the zone but had trouble getting through the MSU defense. After a blocked shot, the Mavericks collected the puck but failed to clear and the rubber bounced to Liam Valente. The Bronco forward then walked to the center of the right circle and beat Tracy high-glove for the opening goal. WMU continued to press after the goal and forced Minnesota State into a few turnovers but they were unable to capitalize. With Western taking over the balance of play MSU needed someone to change the momentum and that's exactly when they got when Brett Moravec went on a solo rush up the ice. After splitting to Bronco defenders, Moravec was slashed by Joona Väisänen to give the Mavericks their first power play of the match. Unfortunately for Minnesota State, their passing continued to be poor and Western ended up getting better chances. Even when the Mavs were able to set up a one-timer, Murr's stick snapped and the Broncso were able to clear. It was only at the very end of the man-advantage that MSU was able to generate a good scoring chance but a sprawling Slukynsky just managed to keep the puck out of the net. After the power play, the game reverted back to a back-and-forth match with both defenses preventing any good shots on goal. Around the mid point of the period, Western's offense began to exert itself once more but Tracy remained stout and kept the puck out of the net. MSU countered after a few minutes and Will Hillman was able to get a puck through Slukynsky but it bounded to the side of the goal. The Mavericks were able to apply some offensive pressure but, again, several opportunities went by the wayside thanks to inaccurate or deflected passes. With under 5 minutes to play, Brian Carrabes fired a shot from the point that just missed the far corner of the net past a screed Slukynsky. MSU kept the puck in the WMU end for much of the remaining time but continued to be plagued by bad passes. With just seconds left, Josh Groll skated into the slot and received a pass from behind the net. He launched a one-timer on goal but the shot was low and Slukynsky was able to make a leg save to keep the Mavericks off of the scoresheet.

After opening the period by icing the puck, Minnesota State was able to get its offense into gear and not only set up in the zone set up in the zone but finally get a good shot on goal. Slukynsky was able to stop the initial shot from Murr but the rebound from Zach Krajnik bounced up and was toward the goal off of a Bronco defender. As it was sliding towards the net, Kaden Bohlsen was the first one to reach the puck and he slammed it home to tie the match. End-to-end action persisted after the goal with both sides narrowly missing out on scoring chances. At around the 12-minute mark, Western appeared to commit a tripping penalty right in front of the Maverick net but neither referee made a call, much to the displeasure of Minnesota State. Fortunately for the Mavs, they were able to get control of the puck and push it back up the ice. With both teams not willing to take a risk and make a disastrous mistake, the game reverted to a tight-checking match but that didn't prevent the offenses from getting their chances. With about 9 minutes to play, MSU got on a late 2-on-1 but could not beat Slukynsky. Shortly afterwards, on a separate possession, Moravec attempted to lay a heavy hit on Bump but as the Bronco forward moved to avoid the check he caught a trailing leg and crashed to the ice. That play had the Western bench up in arms but the referees, perhaps as a makeup call, did not assess a penalty. Minnesota State continued to play physically, crashing into WMU players when the opportunities presented themselves and made use of the long leash provided by the refs. The final few minutes were played mostly in the Western end and Luigi Benincasa was nearly able to find the winning goal. With about 70 seconds left, The Maverick forward got a rebound right in front of the net and one-timed it towards the goal, the puck was rolling and he wasn't able to make good contact, causing the shot to just go off angle and bounce off of the far post. However, neither team could find the winning tally and overtime was needed.

Western Michigan went on the attack at the start of OT but MSU's defense didn't crack. The kept up their physical play and then countered but were unable to get the puck past Slukynsky. A few minutes into the period, MSU committed three consecutive icings. In order to give his players a breather, head coach Luke Strand used his timeout. On the ensuing faceoff, the Mavs got control of the puck and skated it up the ice to take the pressure off. Minnesota State then began to establish zone time and got several good looks on goal but Western's sturdy defense was able to block the puck away. Even though only a few shots got through, Slukynsky still had to stay on the top of his game and stop several high-percentage chances. The middle of the period was typified by tight defense with the refs allowing both teams to commit letter-of-the-law penalties without punishment. MSU was able to take advantage of this and tilt the puck towards the Western end but that didn't prevent the Broncos from having chances of their own. Off of a faceoff in the Maverick end, Bump wired a shot high on goal but Tracy blocked it with his shoulder. A little later the Purple goaltender was called upon again to stop Grant Slukynsky at the side of the net and kept the game going. With five and half left in the period, Western committed an icing. With the players already tired from a long shift, it was Pat Ferschweiler's turn to call a timeout. About a minute later, Bump was able to find a streaking Michaels who went in alone on the MSU net but Tracy was able to make a glove save on a low shot. Both defenses were instrumental in keeping the puck out of the net for the final three minutes as both teams continued to press. With just a few seconds left, Bump found a rebound in front of the Minnesota State crease but he had to rush the shot and Alex Trace telescoped out to made the save just before the end of the period.

Western again was the first to the attack at the beginning of the fifth period and almost was able to find the net just seconds into the session. MSU replied soon thereafter and had their own glorious chance halted by Slukynsky. A few minutes later, WMU coughed up the puck deep in their own end but Luc Wilson had the puck knocked off of his blade as he tried to stickhandle around the Bronco netminder. About a minute later, Western nearly found the net when Wyatt Schingoethe got the puck alone in front of the goal. Tracy made two toe saves before stopping Tim Washe on a third to save the team's season. With both teams growing increasingly fatigued, the hitting tailed off but MSU remained the more physical of the two. Nearing the middle of the period, Zach Nehring threw a weak shot on goal that Tracy was not able to collect. Grant Slukynsky backhanded the rebound which deflected off of Wilson into the net, ending the game.

== Scoring statistics ==
Name	Position	Games	Goals	Assists	Points	PIM
Rhett Pitlick	LW	39	13	27	40	14
Josh Groll	F	38	14	18	32	31
Evan Murr	D	39	7	20	27	8
Adam Eisele	F	37	13	13	26	49
Luigi Benincasa	F	39	6	18	24	8
Brian Carrabes	F	39	10	10	20	8
Kaden Bohlsen	C	28	12	5	17	31
Zach Krajnik	C	39	6	8	14	6
Luc Wilson	F	32	7	6	13	24
Luke Ashton	D	38	5	8	13	6
Ralfs Bergmanis	D	36	3	9	12	29
Will Hillman	F	39	3	6	9	23
Campbell Cichosz	D	37	1	7	8	8
Brett Moravec	F	37	5	2	7	16
Jordan Power	D	37	2	4	6	31
Steven Bellini	D	33	1	5	6	4
Mason Wheeler	D	39	0	6	6	13
Jakob Stender	D	37	3	2	5	13
Brenden Olson	D	37	1	3	4	8
Fin Williams	F	19	1	1	2	2
Eli Pulver	G	1	0	1	1	0
Kade Nielsen	F	4	0	0	0	0
Cade Alami	D	6	0	0	0	4
Jacob Bonkowski	F	7	0	0	0	0
Tyler Haskins	F	7	0	0	0	0
Alex Tracy	G	38	0	0	0	0
Bench	–	–	–	–	–	8
Total			113	179	292	344

== Goaltending statistics ==
Name	Games	Minutes	Wins	Losses	Ties	Goals against	Saves	Shut outs	SV %	GAA
Eli Pulver	1	60:00	1	0	0	1	23	0	.958	1.00
Alex Tracy	38	2317:05	26	9	3	55	960	5	.946	1.42
Empty Net	-	12:51	-	-	-	2	-	-	-	-
Total	39	2389:56	27	9	3	58	983	5	.944	1.46

== Rankings ==
Poll	Week																											
Poll	Pre	1	2	3	4	5	6	7	8	9	10	11	12	13	14	15	16	17	18	19	20	21	22	23	24	25	26	27 (Final)
USCHO.com	RV	19	20	18	16	16	16	17	17	15	12	11	–	12	12	12	14	15	15	14	15	14	14	15	15	14	–	14
USA Hockey	RV	19	RV	16	16	18	16	17	17	15	13	12	–	12	12	12	14	15	15	15	15	17	16	16	15	14	15	15

Note: USCHO did not release a poll in week 12 or 26.
Note: USA Hockey did not release a poll in week 12.

== Awards and honors ==
Player	Award	Ref
Alex Tracy	AHCA All-American West Second Team	
Alex Tracy	CCHA Player of the Year	
Rhett Pitlick	CCHA Forward of the Year	
Evan Murr	CCHA Defenseman of the Year	
Alex Tracy	CCHA Goaltender of the Year	
Luke Strand	CCHA Coach of the Year	
Evan Murr	CCHA Tournament First Star	
Luigi Benincasa	CCHA Tournament Second Star	
Alex Tracy	All-CCHA First Team	
Evan Murr	All-CCHA First Team	
Rhett Pitlick	All-CCHA First Team	
