= Luke Strand =

American ice hockey coach

Current position
- Title: Head coach
- Team: Minnesota State
- Conference: CCHA

Biographical details
- Born: February 12, 1973 (age 53); Angeles City, Philippines
- Education: University of Wisconsin–Eau Claire

Playing career
- 1992–1993: North Iowa Huskies
- 1993–1997: Wisconsin–Eau Claire
- 1997–1999: Madison Monsters
- 1999–2000: Madison Kodiaks
- Position: Right Wing

Coaching career (HC unless noted)
- 2002–2003: St. Norbert (Assistant)
- 2003–2005: Green Bay Gamblers (Assistant)
- 2005–2007: Wisconsin–Eau Claire
- 2007–2009: Houston Aeros (Assistant)
- 2009–2011: Sioux City Musketeers
- 2011–2013: Abbotsford Heat (Assistant)
- 2014–2015: Madison Capitols
- 2015–2016: Wisconsin (Assistant)
- 2016–2017: Calgary Flames (scout)
- 2017–2022: Sioux City Musketeers
- 2022–2023: Ohio State (Assistant)
- 2023–present: Minnesota State

Administrative career (AD unless noted)
- 2013–2014: Sioux City Musketeers (GM)

Head coaching record
- Overall: 226–184–55 (.545) [USHL] 45–24–7 (.638) [NCAA]
- Tournaments: 0–1 (.000)

Accomplishments and honors

Championships
- 2017 USHL Regular Season Champion; 2022 USHL Champion; 2025 CCHA Champion; 2025 CCHA Tournament Champion

Awards
- 2025 CCHA Coach of the Year

Luke Strand (born February 12, 1973) is the current head ice hockey coach of the Minnesota State men's ice hockey team.

== Career ==
While he was born in the Philippines, Strand grew up in Eau Claire, Wisconsin. After graduating from North High School in 1991, Strand joined the North Iowa Huskies to continue his junior career. His numbers with the club were solid but unremarkable. He was, however, able to earn a place on the varsity team at Wisconsin–Eau Claire. After a bad season during his freshman year, Strand was able to help the Blugolds post a winning season as a sophomore. His numbers remained consistent as an upperclassman, however, the team declined and ended with losing records in his final two years.

After graduating with a degree in Kinesiology, Strand continued his playing career with the Madison Monsters, a UHL team. He provided modest depth scoring for two seasons before the Monsters moved to Knoxville. Strand stayed in the area and joined the replacement Madison Kodiaks for their inaugural season in 1999, however, he retired as a player after the year.

When he was in 5th grade, Strand had written a school paper saying that when he grew up he wanted to wither be a fireman or coach. In 2002, he was able to fulfill one of those dreams by joining St. Norbert as an assistant. He helped the Green Knights take the next step in their ascent, finishing the regular season as the #1 team in the country while losing just 1 game. St. Norbert ended up losing in the National Semifinal to the eventual champion, however, they also lost Strand after the year when he accepted a similar position with the Green Bay Gamblers. In two years with the club, Strand was unable to help improve their performance as they missed the playoffs both years. He was, however, able to move on and accepted his first head coaching job, returning to his alma mater.

Strand's second appearance with the Blugolds came as the program was experiencing its nadir and they won just 2 games in his first year behind the bench. While his second season also ended with a losing record, the team performed far better and nearly quintupled their win total. The swift turnaround garnered Strand his first coaching job in the pro ranks and he joined the Houston Aeros as an assistant.

Two years later, Strand returned to the USHL as the head coach for the Sioux City Musketeers. Two years on, after mediocre results, Strand was on the move again and he worked as an assistant for the Abbotsford Heat. Two years later, Strand tried his hand at being a general manager, working in that position for the Musketeers. He lasted just 7 months before accepting the head coaching position for the expansion Madison Capitols. Predictably, the first year team posted a losing record but it would be the best season for the franchise until 2021–22.

Strand left the Capitols after just one season to take his first job at the Division I level, serving as an assistant at Wisconsin. After the season, the head coach, Mike Eaves was not retained and his entire staff was let go. After spending a year working as a scout, Strand returned to the Sioux City for a third stint with the Musketeers. This time, however, he stuck around for a while. Strand served as the head coach for 5 seasons and slowly built the team into a power. In 2022, the Musketeers were third in the regular season and went on a tear through the playoffs, going 8–2 to win the franchise's first championship in 20 years. Coincidentally, Sioux City defeated the Madison Capitols in the finals.

After winning his first title, Strand returned to the college ranks and served as an assistant at Ohio State. He helped the already-successful program return to the NCAA tournament and produce an excellent season, finishing in the top 10 and reaching the Quarterfinal round of the NCAA tournament. Shortly after the end of the season, the head coaching job at Minnesota State opened up and Strand accepted the position.

== Head coaching record ==
=== USHL ===
Team	Year	Regular season							Postseason
Team	Year	G	W	L	OTL	SOL	Pts	Finish	Result
Sioux City Musketeers	2009–10	60	27	24	9	–	(63)	5th in West	
Sioux City Musketeers	2010–11	60	31	23	6	–	(68)	6th in West	Western Conference Quarterfinals
Madison Capitols	2014–15	60	24	25	11	–	(59)	7th in East	
Sioux City Musketeers	2017–18	60	26	26	4	4	(60)	7th in West	
Sioux City Musketeers	2018–19	62	30	25	5	2	(67)	6th in West	Western Conference Quarterfinals
Sioux City Musketeers	2019–20	48	16	24	7	1	(40)	8th in West	
Sioux City Musketeers	2020–21	53	31	21	1	0	(.594)*	3rd in West	Western Conference Final
Sioux City Musketeers	2021–22	62	41	16	4	1	(87)	2nd in West	Clark Cup Champions
Totals		465	226	184	47	8	—	—	—

* percentage used in 2021 due to an unbalanced schedule caused by the COVID-19 pandemic.

=== College ===
Record table
Season	Team	Overall	Conference	Standing	Postseason
Minnesota State Mavericks (CCHA) (2023–present)
2023–24	Minnesota State	18–15–4	12–10–2	4th	CCHA Semifinals
2024–25	Minnesota State	27–9–3	18–5–3	1st	NCAA Fargo Regional Semifinal
Minnesota State:		45–24–7	30–15–5		
Total:		45–24–7			
National champion Postseason invitational champion Conference regular season champion Conference regular season and conference tournament champion Division regular season champion Division regular season and conference tournament champion Conference tournament champion

Awards and achievements
Preceded by Tom Serratore	CCHA Coach of the Year; 2024–25	Succeeded by Incumbent
