= 2025 NCAA Division I men's ice hockey tournament =

- Teams: 16
- Finals site: Enterprise Center, St. Louis, Missouri
- Champions: Western Michigan Broncos (1st title)
- Runner-up: Boston University Terriers (7th title game)
- Semifinalists: Denver Pioneers (19th Frozen Four); Penn State Nittany Lions (1st Frozen Four)
- Winning coach: Pat Ferschweiler (1st title)
- MOP: Owen Michaels (Western Michigan)
- Attendance: 16,953 (Championship); 50,581 (Frozen Four); 128,027 (Tournament)

The 2025 NCAA Division I Men's Ice Hockey Tournament was the national championship tournament for National Collegiate Athletic Association (NCAA) men's Division I college ice hockey in the United States. Held from March 27 to April 12, 2025, the tournament involved 16 teams in single-elimination play to determine the national champion for the top level of play. Western Michigan won their first national championship in program history.

This year's tournament was the first since 2019 to feature multiple programs (Connecticut and Bentley) making their first appearance in the NCAA hockey playoffs.

This year's Frozen Four, at Enterprise Center in St. Louis, Missouri, also featured multiple teams, Western Michigan and Penn State, making their first appearance. This last occurred in 2013, when Massachusetts-Lowell, Quinnipiac and St. Cloud State all made their first Frozen Four appearances. Western Michigan also became the first team since Lake Superior State in 1988 to win a championship in their first Frozen Four appearance.

The semifinal matchup between Denver and Western Michigan was the first Frozen Four game to require multiple overtime periods since a 1996 semifinal game between Vermont and Colorado College. With Western Michigan's 3-2 win over Denver in double overtime, they became the first team in NCAA Division I Men's Ice Hockey Tournament history to play in, and win, two multiple-overtime games in the same tournament.

== Tournament procedure ==
2025 Regionals (blue) and Frozen Four (red)

The tournament was composed of four groups of four teams in regional brackets. The four regionals are named after the cities in which they take place. The following are the sites for the 2025 regionals:

Regional Semifinals and Finals

- March 27 & 29

Toledo Regional, Huntington Center – Toledo, Ohio (Hosts: Bowling Green State University and SMG - Huntington Center)
Fargo Regional, Scheels Arena – Fargo, North Dakota (Host: University of North Dakota)

- March 28 & 30

Allentown Regional, PPL Center – Allentown, Pennsylvania (Hosts: Pennsylvania State University and Spectra)
Manchester Regional, SNHU Arena – Manchester, New Hampshire (Host: University of New Hampshire)

National semifinals and championship (Frozen Four and championship)

- April 10 & 12

Enterprise Center – St. Louis, Missouri (Hosts: University of Vermont and St. Louis Sports Commission)

== Qualifying teams ==
The at-large bids and seeding for each team in the tournament were announced on March 23, 2025, on ESPNU at 3:00 pm ET.

Hockey East received six bids to the tournament while the Big Ten received four. Both ECAC Hockey and NCHC received two bids while Atlantic Hockey America and the CCHA each received one.

Manchester Regional							Toledo Regional						
Seed	School	Conference	Record	Berth type	Appearance	Last bid	Seed	School	Conference	Record	Berth type	Appearance	Last bid
1	Boston College (1)	Hockey East	26–7–2	At-large	38th	2024	1	Michigan State (2)	Big Ten	26–6–4	Tournament champion	29th	2024
2	Providence (8)	Hockey East	21–10–5	At-large	16th	2019	2	Boston University (7)	Hockey East	21–13–2	At-large	40th	2024
3	Denver (9)	NCHC	29–11–1	At-large	32nd	2024	3	Ohio State (10)	Big Ten	24–13–2	At-large	11th	2023
4	Bentley (16)	AHA	23–14–2	Tournament champion	1st	Never	4	Cornell (15)	ECAC Hockey	18–10–6	Tournament champion	25th	2024
Allentown Regional							Fargo Regional						
Seed	School	Conference	Record	Berth type	Appearance	Last bid	Seed	School	Conference	Record	Berth type	Appearance	Last bid
1	Maine (3)	Hockey East	24–7–6	Tournament champion	20th	2024	1	Western Michigan (4)	NCHC	30–7–1	Tournament champion	10th	2024
2	Connecticut (6)	Hockey East	22–11–4	At-large	1st	Never	2	Minnesota (5)	Big Ten	25–10–4	At-large	42nd	2024
3	Quinnipiac (12)	ECAC Hockey	24–11–2	At-large	11th	2024	3	Massachusetts (11)	Hockey East	20–13–5	At-large	6th	2024
4	Penn State (13)	Big Ten	20–13–4	At-large	4th	2023	4	Minnesota State (14)	CCHA	27–8–3	Tournament champion	10th	2023

Number in parentheses denotes overall seed in the tournament.

== Bracket ==
Regional Semifinals; March 27–28
1	Boston College (1)	3
4	Bentley	1
Manchester – SNHU Arena – Fri/Sun
2	Providence	1
3	Denver	5
1	Western Michigan (4)	2**
4	Minnesota State	1
Fargo – Scheels Arena – Thu/Sat
2	Minnesota	4
3	Massachusetts	5*
1	Michigan State (2)	3
4	Cornell	4
Toledo – Huntington Center – Thu/Sat
2	Boston University	8
3	Ohio State	3
1	Maine (3)	1
4	Penn State	5
Allentown – PPL Center – Fri/Sun
2	Connecticut	4
3	Quinnipiac	1

Regional Finals; March 29–30
1	Boston College (1)	1
3	Denver	3
1	Western Michigan (4)	2
3	Massachusetts	1
4	Cornell	2
2	Boston University	3*
4	Penn State	3*
2	Connecticut	2

National Semifinals; April 10
M3	Denver	2
F1	Western Michigan (4)	3**
T2	Boston University	3
A4	Penn State	1

National Championship; April 12
F1	Western Michigan (4)	6
T2	Boston University	2

Number in parentheses denotes overall seed in the tournament
* denotes overtime period(s)

== Results ==
Note: All game times are local.

=== Manchester Region ===
==== Regional semifinals ====
March 28, 2025; 2:00 pm	(1) Boston College	3–1 (1–0, 0–1, 2–0)	(4) Bentley	SNHU Arena; Attendance: 7,368

Game reference

Jacob Fowler
Goalies
Connor Hasley
Referees:
Sterling Egan
Bruce Vida Jr.
Linesmen:
Patrick Giles
Nick Huff

(Leonard, J. Hagens) Gabe Perreault (16) – 16:45	1–0
	1–1	23:21 – PP – Ethan Leyh (17) (Castagna, Bochen)
(Minnetian, Fortescue) James Hagens (11) – GW – 58:43	2–1
(Hreschuk) Ryan Leonard (30) – EN – 59:28	3–1

6 min
Penalties
10 min
44
Shots
21

Game summary
The game started with BC being able to get the puck in deep while the Falcons could barely get over the blueline. While neither team was able to establish any real zone time, the Eagles were able to get several shots on Connor Hasley in the first few minutes. On one such exchange around the 4-minute mark, Hasley was unable to freeze the puck but got a lucky break when the ref lost sight of the puck and blew the whistle erroneously. Around the same time, Ryan Leonard ran into Hasley after being knocked down and the two forced the net off its moorings. On a later play, Hasley was able to push the net out of place with his leg, continuing an issue that the ice crew had been dealing with since before the start of the match. The game was paused for several minutes to give the maintenance team time to try and reset the pegs. On the ensuing play, Bentley appeared to commit two separate infractions, at least according to the BC faithful, but the referees disagreed. With the Eagles unable to buy a questionable call, Boston College started trying to push Bentley around after the whistle to see if they could goad one of the Falcons into making a mistake. While BC attempted to plant that seed, they persisted with the offensive pressure. The Eagles were able to tilt the ice towards the Falcons' end and set up in the offensive zone and besieged Hasley for several minutes in the middle of the period. A further potential Bentley penalty went uncalled by the referees who appeared to have decided to just let the two teams play. In spite of the lack of power plays, BC led in shots 10–0 halfway through the period. Bentley got a break when BC committed an icing call, giving the Falcons their first offensive zone draw of the game with 9 minutes to play. BC won the faceoff but then immediately iced the puck a second time. The second draw was a little closer but BC still managed to clear the zone. Moments later, the first penalty of the game was on Aidan Hreschuk for crosschecking. Many in the crowd were in disbelief with the borderline call after the earlier plays that had been let go. BC went on the attack during the disadvantage and was able to get a disjointed break on the Benley goal. After the Falcons regain possession they were able to set up their power play and get their first two shots of the match. While he had not seen any action to that point, Jacob Fowler was equal to the task. Once even strength play resumed, BC tried to get right back to their dominant play. Bentley, however, was able to built off their failed power play and finally break through the Boston College defense. Play evened out in the later part of the period but a bad turnover at the far blueline led to a rush up the ice by BC. Leonard found Gabe Perreault open down low and the winger moved around Hasley and slipped the puck into the net. Undaunted, Bentley went on the attack to try and get the goal back but they were unable to get a good shot on goal. With about a minute to play, the BC goal had trouble staying in position so the game was paused for a second time to fix the problem. When play resumed for a second time, BC's upped their offensive pressure. Hasley was forced to scramble but managed to keep the puck out until the horn sounded.

The second began with the two teams exchanging chances off the rush and, after a minute, the net behind Hasley was knocked from its mooring. On the ensuing play, BC was able to halt a Bentley rush but Lukas Gustafsson took a tripping minor in doing so. The Falcons had trouble setting up in the offensive zone but when they were finally able to do so, Ethan Leyh got two solid shots on goal, the second of which beat Fowler. After the ensuing faceoff, BC was able to finally draw it first power play with Jake Black grabbed James Hagens twice. The BC man-advantage was able to get several good looks at the goal but Bentley was able to block several shots while the rest either went wide or were stopped by Hasley. After Bentley iced the puck, the Falcon net was knocked out of place for the third time and the game paused once again to try and resolve the issue. After what was essentially an extra TV timeout, Bentley was able to clear the puck and relieve the pressure. Boston College remained in control for long stretches with occasional counters by Bentley. Near the middle of the period, Hasley bobbled a glove save but with no Eagle nearby the goaltender was able to smother the puck for a faceoff. By the midway point of the game it was apparent that Boston College was the better of the two and Bentley was only in the match thanks to a herculean defensive effort. Even, so, the game was tied and Nik Armstrong-Kingkade nearly gave the Falcons the lead when he hit the post on a solo rush. Just seconds later, the Falcons made a bad line change and were called for too many men. Boston College's second power play appeared to work to perfection and Perreault had a half-open cage but the puck was on edge and his shot went high and wide. Afterwards, the teams took matching minors that didn't change the makeup of the game but did take two of the top players off of the ice. When play resumed, the net behind Hasley was knocked off for the fourth time on the night and the problem was becoming as much of a story in the game as the players. The stoppage helped to kill off the rest of the BC power play as well as slow down the pace of play. The two teams carried the puck up and down the ice but neither was able to generate a good scoring chance for several minutes. With under 3 minutes to play, Bentley got on the attack but hit the post with another shot. The waning moments saw both team trying and failing to break through the defenses and the period ended with the two squads knotted at one.

Early in the third, Bentley was able to turn over the puck in the BC end and get themselves a couple of good looks at the net but strong play from the Eagle defense prevent either opportunity from reaching Fowler. Boston College countered and got a hard shot on goal that Hasley was unable to cover but the Falcons were first on the puck and able to clear it from danger. Further strong play from both the BC and Bentley defenses kept the puck out of the respective goals and both teams seemed dead set on doing everything they could to keep the other from scoring. Despite the emphasis in their own ends, the two teams were able to generate several scoring opportunities but neither could follow up after the initial shot. BC continued to press in spite of their failed attempts and eventually drew another power play when Armstrong-Kingkade was called for kneeing in the seventh minute. Bentley was able to kill off the first half of the man-advantage with relative ease but just as the power play was winging down, Arlo Merritt took a tripping penalty to extend BC's advantage. Perreault hit the outside of the post off of the ensuing faceoff and then Bentley was able to just disrupt the Eagles structure enough to force a turnover, then an offsides and finally an icing. The Falcons seemed to take heart at the mistakes made by Boston College and the defense remained locked in, continually blocking shots and passes to kill off the entire stretch of BC power play. Afterwards, Bentley began to play defense almost as if they had the lead but the result was that BC had great difficulty getting through on the rush. Even so, a bad turnover in the Falcons end gave James Hagens a glorious look at the goal but he delayed too long and by the time he shot the puck one of the Falcons was able to get his stick in the way and deflect the puck out of play. Boston College kept trying to set up passing plays and Bentley continued to get sticks and bodies in the way. With about 5 minutes to go, Bentley was able to get some pressure on Fowler but the BC netminder matched his counterpart by stopping the multi-shot attempt. With snow building up around the ice, BC committed consecutive icings near the end of the period but were able to clear the puck after each faceoff. With under two minutes to play, BC was finally able to follow up a rush and, after forcing a turnover, James Hagens was able to grab a loose puck behind the net and wrap it around for the go ahead goal. Bentley called a timeout to get themselves set for the final 77 seconds. BC got possession of the puck and forced Bentley to play in their end for several seconds. After the Falcons second attempt at zone entry, Hasley was pulled and, a moment later, Ryan Leonard netted an empty-net goal to salt away the game.

March 28, 2025; 5:30 pm	(2) Providence	1–5 (0–1, 0–2, 1–2)	(3) Denver	SNHU Arena; Attendance: 7,368

Game reference

Philip Svedebäck
Goalies
Matt Davis
Referees:
Andrew Bruggeman
David Marcotte
Linesmen:
Justin Cornell
Pat Richardson

	0–1	02:25 – Connor Caponi (5) (unassisted)
	0–2	23:17 – GW – Zeev Buium (12) (Thompson, King)
	0–3	26:01 – PP – Sam Harris (23) (Buium, King)
	0–4	43:53 – Aidan Thompson (20) (Buium, Salminen)
(Will) Austen May (1) – PP – 51:39	1–4
	1–5	55:09 – SH EN – Carter King (17) (unassisted)

18 min
Penalties
33 min
31
Shots
20

Game summary

==== Regional final ====
March 30, 2025; 7:00 pm	(1) Boston College	1–3 (0–1, 1–1, 0–1)	(3) Denver	SNHU Arena; Attendance: 6,802

Game reference

Jacob Fowler
Goalies
Matt Davis
Referees:
Colin Kronforst
Jake Rekucki
Linesmen:
Jake Davis
Sam Shikowski

	0–1	18:19 – Eric Pohlkamp (11) (Devine, Thompson)
	0–2	22:59 – GW – James Reeder (11) (Buium, Salminen)
(Vote) Teddy Stiga (14) – 39:07	1–2
	1–3	59:56 – EN – Zeev Buium (13) (unassisted)

4 min
Penalties
2 min
36
Shots
25

Game summary

=== Toledo Region ===
==== Regional semifinals ====
March 27, 2025; 5:30 pm	(1) Michigan State	3–4 (2–1, 1–1, 0–2)	(4) Cornell	Huntington Center; Attendance: 6,937

Game reference

Trey Augustine
Goalies
Ian Shane
Referees:
Geoff Miller
Terrance Murphy
Linesmen:
Bill Kingdon
Jeff McCorkle

(Larson, Dorwart) Gavin O'Connell (6) – 07:20	1–0
	1–1	15:02 – Ryan Walsh (15) (Robertson, Mack)
(Stramel, Howard) Daniel Russell (13) – PP – 19:31	2–1
	2–2	36:30 – Charlie Major (4) (Stanley)
(Štrbák, O'Connell) Karsen Dorwart (13) – 36:47	3–2
	3–3	52:38 – Ryan Walsh (16) (Robertson)
	3–4	59:50 – GW PP – Sullivan Mack (17) (Major, Fegaras)

2 min
Penalties
2 min
37
Shots
21

Game summary

March 27, 2025; 2:00 pm	(2) Boston University	8–3 (0–1, 3–2, 5–0)	(3) Ohio State	Huntington Center; Attendance: 6,907

Game reference

Mikhail Yegorov
Goalies
Logan Terness
Referees:
Nick Krebsbach
Brandon Schmitt
Linesmen:
Eric Frank
Chris Williams

	0–1	09:06 – Joe Dunlap (7) (Hansen-Bukata, Ja. Dunlap)
(Kaplan, Bednarik) Cole Eiserman (22) – 28:07	1–1
	1–2	32:50 – PP – Joe Dunlap (8) (Rozzi, Hansen-Bukata)
(C. Hutson, Greene) Quinn Hutson (22) – PP – 37:19	2–2
	2–3	37:49 – Max Montes (14) (Weis, Able)
(Hughes, Harvey) Matt Copponi (5) – 38:01	3–3
(Copponi, Willander) Aiden Celebrini (5) – GW – 42:18	4–3
(Greene, C. Hutson) Jack Hughes (6) – SH – 45:25	5–3
(C. Hutson) Cole Eiserman (23) – 48:07	6–3
(Hughes, Boumedienne) Jack Harvey (10) – 54:16	7–3
(unassisted) Cole Hutson (13) – SH – EN – 59:30	8–3

24 min
Penalties
4 min
23
Shots
36

Game summary
The game began slowly with both teams trying to feel one another out. A few one-and-done chances were obtained but the first five minutes was dominated by turnovers from both sides. The first real chance of the game came when Riley Thompson skated through the BU defense at 4:20 but Mikhail Yegorov made the save. Ohio State was able to establish some zone time afterwards but they were kept to the outside and unable to generate a scoring chance. The game returned to being a sleepy affair until the middle of the period. After setting up in the Terriers' end the puck came to Aiden Hansen-Bukata at the point. The Buckeye defenseman fired a soft shot on goal that Yegorov stopped with his pad but the puck bounced right to the stick of Joe Dunlap who had a wide-open cage and did not miss for the game's opening goal. Less than a minute later, Quinn Hutson was whistled for a slashing call to give OSU a chance to increase their lead. Yegorov was called upon to make several stops during the kill but it was Gavin McCarthy who made the biggest save when he rescued a puck from the goal line after it had leaked through the BU goaltender. Ohio State remained in control of the action for several minutes after their man-advantage thanks in part to their early dominance on faceoffs. After Yegorov made another key save from in tight, Cole Hutson took his turn in the penalty box with a hooking minor. Ohio State moved the puck well on the power play but missed on a few of their passes. Yegorov was forced to make a few saves in the back half of the man-advantage but BU was able to get control of the rebounds and clear the puck out of danger. OSU kept the Terriers on their heels until they committed an icing and allowed the Terriers to get some breathing room. BU was finally able to get its second shot of the game shortly afterwards but by the end of the period they found themselves trailing Ohio State 2–15 in that department. The only bright spot in the entire period for BU was that OSU was called for a penalty at the end and the Terriers would begin the second with their first power play of the match.

After a slow start, Boston University was able to finally get its first real scoring chance on the power play but Logan Terness was equal to the task. Ohio State's 50th-ranked penalty kill was able to stymie the Terriers and retain their lead. However, the momentum began to shift and BU was able to finally establish some offensive zone time afterwards to try and even out the play. After another giveaway by BU around the 5-minute mark, Yegorov had to make another big save in tight, this time on Patrick Guzzo. The Terriers began to show of their offensive talent in the middle of the period but the OSU defense was able to block several shots. Right after winning an offensive draw, Cole Eiserman rifled a shot into the top corner of the net to tie the game. BU began to take over after their goal until Gunnarwolfe Fontaine broke in on the Terrier goal just after the midway point of the game. Yegorov made the save and the match began to see-saw between the two clubs. Before anything could happen, however, Devin Kaplan smacked one of the OSU players in the head with his forearm and was given a roughing minor. The bad penalty ended up costing BU as Joe Dunlap scored his second of the game off of the rush. BU got right back on the attack after the penalty but the Ohio State defense limited the Terriers to long shots on goal that Terness was able to stop. With just over 3 minutes in the period, Jake Dunlap was called for hooking. After a pretty bit of passing, the nation's #5 power play connected when a wide-open Quinn Hutson wired the puck in off of the goal post. Riding high off of their second goal, BU Gave up a 2-on-1 and allowed the Buckeyes to take a lead when Max Montes fired low-stick on Yegorov. Just 12 seconds later, Matt Copponi received a pass from behind the cage and smacked the puck past Terness to even the count once more. With the two teams doing their best to wear out the goal horn, Shane Lachance took a very ill-advised interference penalty and was nearly given a second for arguing with the referees. About a minute in, Thompson nearly made the Terriers pay a second time but couldn't get the proper angle on a deflected puck and missed a wide-open net. Just as time was expiring, Joe Dunlap scored what he believed was his third of the game but time had expired moments before the puck entered the net and the game remained tied.

After BU was able to salt away the remainder of the penalty at the start of the third, Lachance got a good chance on goal but Terness was able to stop his relatively weak shot. A few minutes later, Terness failed to stop another weak shot from Aiden Celebrini then slipped under his right arm. With their first lead of the game, BU remained on the attack but OSU countered and the two started skating up and down the ice, trying to break through the opposing defenses. By this point, the Terriers had begun to take over on the faceoff dot but the Buckeyes used their structure to take control of the puck and generate another good scoring chance. While Yegorov made the save, the Terriers took their fifth minor of the game immediately afterwards to give Ohio State a golden opportunity to tie the match once more. A few seconds into the man-advantage, the puck bounced right to the BU defenders on the blueline and Jack Hughes carried the puck up the ice on a 2-on-1. The BU forward shot the puck and it was deflected past Terness by an OSU stick to double the lead. About a minute later, Cole Hutson was almost scored on a second 2-on-1 shorthanded chance. Shortly after the penalty expired, Eiserman smacked the puck backhanded from behind the goal line. The puck hit Terness as he was hugging the post but it found a hole and dropped into the goal. With the complexion of the game completely changed, OSU had to now abandon its defensive structure in the hope of finding three goals in the final 12 minutes. This however, only served to feed into the BU offense and allowed the Terriers to continue firing the puck on the Ohio State goal. Just past the 10-minute mark, Eiserman nearly completed a hat-trick when he shot at a half-empty cage but the puck hit the right post and bounced out the other side. Afterwards, the Buckeyes began to press but Yegorov remained strong in goal and kept the puck out of the net. On a counterattack, Jack Harvey made a move around a Buckeye defender and found himself wide open in front of the net. He flipped the puck into the top corner to give BU a 4-goal lead with under 6 minutes to play. The rest of the game was a bit loose as both teams seemed to understand that the game was essentially over. The Buckeyes were a bit physical in the waning moments but it was the Terriers who were called for a penalty when Celebrini was given a minor for interference with about 2 minutes left on the clock. Devin Kaplan then received a 2- and a 10-minute for yelling at the referees. With a 2-man advantage, Terness was pulled to give the Buckeyes a fleeting chance to tie. However, with less than a minute to play, Cole Hutson got control of the puck, danced through two OSU defenders and scored into the empty net to essentially end the game.

==== Regional final ====
March 29, 2025; 4:00 pm	(2) Boston University	3–2 (OT) (1–1, 0–0, 1–1, 1–0)	(4) Cornell	Huntington Center; Attendance: 6,453

Game reference

Mikhail Yegorov
Goalies
Ian Shane
Referees:
Eric Frank
Chris Williams
Linesmen:
Bruce Vida Jr.
Nick Huff

	0–1	07:35 – Ryan Walsh (17) (Bancroft, Rego)
(C. Hutson) Matt Copponi (6) – 08:47	1–1
(Greene, Q. Hutson) Cole Hutson (14) – PP – 40:34	2–1
	2–2	54:30 – Jack O'Leary (8) (Rego, Mack)
(Greene, Lachance) Quinn Hutson (23) – GW – 66:25	3–2

8 min
Penalties
9 min
43
Shots
39

Game summary
The match began fast with both teams playing to form. Boston University went on the attack while the Cornell defense held them back. Just two minutes into the game, Brandon Svoboda was called for tripping to give the Big Red the first power play of the game. Cornell was very deliberate on their man-advantage, moving the puck slowly. This allowed BU to hold their formation and kill off the penalty with relative ease. As soon as Svoboda left the box, BU went right back on the attack and was able to draw their own power play due to a tripping by Hank Kempf. The Terriers looked much more comfortable with their man-advantage, passing and skating with aplomb, but Cornell was equally at home defending and the Big Red were able to prevent any good scoring chances. Right after the penalty, Cornell, rushed up the ice on a 3-on-2 and Dalton Bancroft threw a shot on goal. Mikhail Yegorov easily stopped it with his blocker but the puck bounced out, hit Ryan Walsh and deflected into the net. The referee immediately waved off the goal for being directed in with a glove but Mike Schafer challenged the call. After the review the call was reversed as the puck had hit Walsh in the hip instead of the hand and Cornell was awarded the first goal of the game. Undeterred, BU got back on the attack and a minute later Cole Hutson carried the puck into the Cornell end. He ended up losing control but Matt Copponi was able to snag the loose puck and put it on goal. Ian Shane made the initial save but the rubber bounced back, and Kempf accidentally kicked it into his own net. After the two quick goals, the two teams began exchanging rushes with neither able to establish much offensive zone time. As the period progresses, Cornell began to tilt the ice towards Yegorov but the Terriers collapsed down to their goal and didn't give the Big Red any shots in tight. After a potential tripping call by BU was let go by the referees, the Terriers were called for their second penalty when Jack Hughes slashed Charlie Major's stick. Cornell was aided on their second power play by failed clears but Yegorov made a couple of key save to keep the score tied. After the penalty expired, Cornell continued to press in the BU end and got a few good looks on goal. The Terriers' defense pressured the Big Red, forcing them to move the puck but they were unable to cause a turnover. Yegorov was again forced to make a save and the two sides devolved into a bit of roughhousing afterwards. During the exchange, the refs decided to pause to make an official review of the play to see if there was a penalty for grabbing the face mask. After a lengthy break, Walsh was handed a 5-minute major to give one of the best power plays in the nation a glorious opportunity. The Terriers were able to produce a few great chances but Shane was equal to the task and the score remained tied. With just seconds left in the first period, Devin Kaplan took a slashing call on Cornell's clearing attempt and gave the Big Red a 2-minute reprieve for the start of the second.

With some extra space on the ice during 4-on-4 play, neither side looked particularly comfortable with mistakes being made at both ends of the ice. After two minutes of a relatively slow pace, Cornell was able to kill off the final minute of the major and then restart their forecheck. Though the Terriers turned the puck over in their own zone, their speed enabled them to thwart the Big Red's scoring attempts. Boston University was eventually to reply in kind and Hughes had a point-black shot from the slot but he fired the puck right into Shane's glove. Cornell continued to ramp up the pressure, stealing the puck from the Terriers every chance they could get and then counterattacking up the ice. BU managed to get back in time to stop several chances while Yegorov stopped what little leaked through. After the midpoint of the game, Cole Eiserman had a shot an a wide-open net but chipped the puck over the net. At the 5-minute mark, Jacob Kraft broke in on Yegorov and bumped into the netminder after he made a save. After the whistle, Kraft was shoved to the ice by Shane Lachance but no penalty was called. Both teams were getting chances on goal but the puck was spending most of its time in the BU end. This was due to Cornell being able to pounce on seemingly every loose puck in their own end and then clearing the zone before the Terriers could force a turnover. Near the end of the period, Cornell began to exhibit some offensive talent and a brilliant pass found Ondřej Pšenička in front of the net but Yegorov was able to make the save. BU countered and long pass up ice found Jack Harvey for a breakaway his five-hole attempt was stopped by Shane. Just as the period was winding down, Bancroft gave Harvey a tug with his free hand behind the net and was called for holding. As the period expired before Cornel could touch the puck, the entire power play would occur at the start of the third.

It took just over 30 seconds for Cole Hutson to fire the puck in off the far post through a razor-thin gap for a highlight-reel goal. The action was up and down for the next several minutes but neither defense surrendered much in the way of scoring chances. With around 14 to play, a failed clear by BU allowed Cornell to get the puck to the front of the net but the Terriers were able to clear before Cornell could fins the puck. On the counterattack, Lachance and Quinn Hutson were nearly able to slide the puck past a sprawling Shane bit the Cornell goalie was able to get a quick whistle. The play continued to see-saw up and down the ice but BU was able to play a little more defense than they had earlier and prevent Cornell from setting up in the offensive zone. Just after the middle of the period, the Big Red were finally able to establish themselves in the BU end and ended up drawing a tripping call from Copponi. The BU forward argued the call afterwards but was not handed a misconduct. BU attacked the Cornell players on the power play, forcing the Big Red to constantly move the puck. Though that resulted in several miscues by Cornell, they were still able to generate several chances but none found their mark. Just after the penalty expired, Jack O'Leary was able to get the puck in the high slot and he fired it against the grain, off the post for the tying goal. 30 seconds later, a bad turnover in the Cornell end led to a tremendous chance for Hughes but Shane made a magnificent leg save to keep his team in the game. With both teams searching for the winner, the game opened up in the final 4 minutes but both defenses remained on guard. BU was able to get into the Cornell end with a few minutes to play and Cole Hutson attempted to replicate his earlier goal on a nearly-identical play but the puck was kept out. Cornell then carried the play up the ice and was able to get an offensive zone draw off of an icing. With 13 seconds left, Cornell won a pair of draws and Major was able to get hard show on goal but Yegorov made the save and the two teams headed into overtime.

Boston University was first off the hop, getting a solid scoring chance in the first 15 seconds. After Shane made the save, Cornell rushed into the BU end and got a pair of looks at Yegorov before the defenses were able to calm things down. BU was able to get an offensive attack going but tight checking from Cornell kept them to the outside and allowed the Big Red to clear the puck. A miss by Eiserman from a sharp angle careened off the glass and allowed Cornell to get a chance after a long shift. After BU get back on the attack they were able to move the puck along the wall and keep it away from Cornell long enough for Quinn Hutson to fire a shot from the point that managed to find its way through a sea of bodies and end the game.

=== Allentown Region ===
==== Regional semifinals ====
March 28, 2025; 8:30 pm	(1) Maine	1–5 (1–3, 0–1, 0–1)	(4) Penn State	PPL Center; Attendance: 7,358

Game reference

Albin Boija
Goalies
Arsenii Sergeev
Referees:
C. J. Hanafin
Cameron Lynch
Linesmen:
Patrick Dapuzzo
John Rey

(unassisted) Bodie Nobes (1) – 04:10	1–0
	1–1	05:04 – PP – J. J. Wiebusch (13) (Cerrato, Fink)
	1–2	14:26 – Matt DiMarsico (15) (Wiebusch, Cerrato)
	1–3	18:08 – PP – Dane Dowiak (10) (Dzhaniyev, Mack)
	1–4	25:41 – Matt DiMarsico (16) (Cerrato)
	1–5	56:37 – EN – Dane Dowiak (11) (unassisted)

10 min
Penalties
4 min
27
Shots
34

Game summary
The final game of the First Round began fast with both teams looking to prove themselves early. After a few rushes by both sides, the puck came to into the Maine zone about 2 minutes in. While no scoring chance occurred, Reese Laubach took a high crosscheck and crashed to the ice next to the net. After he skated off with an apparent injury, the Bears pushed the puck up the ice and established themselves in the zone. They got the puck to the front of the net and while the puck was slapped away by Keaton Peters, it deflected up into the air, arced over the shoulder of Arsenii Sergeev and landed in the net. The goal had a lengthy official review and determined that the hit on Laubach was not worthy of a major penalty and allowed the goal to stand. When play resumed, Penn State got right into the offensive zone and Albin Boija was forced to stop a pair of chances in quick succession. Just before the 50-minute mark, the PSU attack drew the game's first penalty when Thomas Freel was handed a boarding minor. Less than 10 seconds later, a cross crease pass gave J. J. Wiebusch a clear shot at a goal and he quickly tied the game. The fast pace continued after the goal and the teams alternated chances and both forechecked hard. Near the middle of the frame, Maine once again went a little over the line and Charlie Russell was handed a boarding penalty. The Nittany Lions carried the play in the early part of the man-advantage but Maine was able to keep them from scoring. In the second half of the penalty, Maine was able to get a glorious shorthanded chance but Owen Fowler's shot was deflected wide. A few seconds later, Charlie Cerrato was handed a boarding penalty and ended the PSU power play 30 seconds early. The brief 4-on-4 play saw both teams try to gain the upper hand but the defenses held. Once the Maine power play began, the Bears quickly got set up in the offensive zone but they had trouble getting the puck through to the net. Sergeev only had to make one save late and the Lions killed off the remainder of the time. Shortly afterwards, Taylor Makar rushed the puck deep into the Black Bears' end but he took a spill and crashed into the boards. Luckily, he got right back to his feet and looked to have escaped injury. With about 6 minutes to play, the referees missed what appeared to be a high-sticking penalty by Maine. Instead of complaining, Penn State skated right down the ice and got the puck to a streaking Matt DiMarsico. The forward fought off a hook from the defense and then fired the puck high into the far corner. On the return to action, Dylan Lugris was handed a minor for slashing to give Maine its second man-advantage. Furious work from both sides saw the Bears fire several shots on goal but in their zeal to keep the pressure on, Freel committed a hooking penalty on an attempted clear and it was Maine's turn to lose it power play early. The Lions spent most of their man-advantage struggling to find room but, just as it was winding down, Penn State fired the uck towards the net and the puck deflected in off of Dane Dowiak skate. Maine challenged the play for offsides but the officials allowed the goal to stand. Once play resumed the speed increased, if anything. Both teams played hard until the horn sounded but it was Penn State that carried the balance of play.

The second period began with Maine skating fast and trying to break into the Penn State zone while the Nittany Lions countered with a more reserved attack. PSU was content to wait for their opportunities and they were rewarded with a breakaway just two minutes in but Boija was able to stop Aiden Fink with his glove. The Black Bears shook off the near-miss and continued to pressure Penn State but were unable to find the net. Just past the 5-minute mark, David Breazeale threw a blind pass behind his own net but the only one in the area was Charlie Cerrato. The Lion forward found DiMarsico in front of the net and the sophomore made no mistake, burying his second of the night into the top corner. With a 3-goal lead now, Penn State had little reason to go away from their defense-first game even with half of the match still to be played. Despite Maine pressing hard in the offensive zone, the Lions counterattack was getting the better chances and Boija had to work just to keep his team in the match. Maine was almost able to get one back with about 7 minutes to play when the puck bounced out of Sergeev's glove but it slid past the outside of the post. Physical play afterwards saw both teams throwing the body around and Dowiak was slow to get up. Shortly after, Cerrato crashed into Boija, hitting the goaltender high and nocking his head into the post. After an injury stoppage, the Swede was able to continue. Neither team shied away from contact as Manie tried to force their way into the Penn State end but the Nittany Lions would not oblige. PSU's patience continued to be rewarded with the best chances and Cerrato was inches away from finding a goal with 2 minutes to play but the angle on his shot was just a little off. The final moments passed by with little effect and had Penn State up by three going into the final period.

Almost as soon as the players got back onto the ice the hitting resumed. Early on, Maine was finally able to establish some offensive zone time and on their second entry they were able to get some scoring chances on goal. Penn State nearly countered with a 2-on-0 but the puck ended up rolling into the corner. Past the 5-minute mark, Bodie Nobes crashed into his own net, taking out Boija and Fink in the process, but no one was injured on the play. As time ticked away, Maine's chances at getting back into the game became increasingly remote. As the period progressed, Penn State seemed to be getting stronger and didn't allow Maine to stay in their zone for long. Near the middle of the period, Nicholas DeGraves got the puck right in the slot in front of the Maine net. His shot went wide but concurrent with the chance he was hit hard by Makar and crashed to the ice in pain. Despite protests from the Penn State bench, no penalty was called on the play. Maine began upping their offensive pressure and was able to get the puck deep into the PSU zone but the Nittany Lions' defense blocked a pair of opportunities. About a minute later, Josh Nadeau took a slashing penalty, costing Maine vital time that they could ill afford. However, just like Penn State had earlier, Maine was able to get a few solid shorthanded chances on Sergeev As they were going for a third scoring chance, Harrison Scott was called for crosschecking and put Maine on the defensive for another 2 minutes. Boija was forced to make several stellar saves during the extended power play but did not allow the Lions to score. Back at even strength, Maine had just 6 minutes remaining to find 3 goals but still found it difficult to fight through the Penn State defense. After forcing an offensive zone draw, Boija was pulled for an extra attacker giving the Bears 6 skaters with just over 4 minutes to play. However, despite their best efforts, Penn State was able to turn over the puck and Dowiak was able to skate down the ice and deposit his second of the night into an open goal. The game calmed down a little after the marker but Maine continued to skate, refusing to knuckle under in spite of the score. The final minutes were completed without too many fireworks and ended with Penn State as the clear victor.

March 28, 2025; 5:00 pm	(2) Connecticut	4–1 (2–0, 1–1, 1–0)	(3) Quinnipiac	PPL Center; Attendance: 7,358

Game reference

Callum Tung
Goalies
Dylan Silverstein
Referees:
Brendan Blanchard
Ryan Sweeney
Linesmen:
Brendan Lewis
Joe Sherman

(Heaslip, Carabin) Hugh Larkin (3) – 08:25	1–0
(unassisted) Ethan Gardula (8) – GW – 14:32	2–0
	2–1	30:11 – Jeremy Wilmer (15) (Marcellus, Leddy)
(Percival, Spetz) Tristan Fraser (4) – 34:13	3–1
(Messineo) Joey Muldowney (28) – EN – 57:45	4–1

6 min
Penalties
4 min
22
Shots
22

Game summary
The start of the game saw Cooper Moore get crosschecked to the ice and then slide into his goal post but he was able to skate away without injury. The two teams were skating fast to start but both seemed to be trying to force the play a bit on offense and failed to connect on their opportunities. The first good chance came then Quinnipiac coughed up the puck behind their net but Dylan Silverstein was able to make the save on Tristan Fraser. The two teams skated up and down the ice for the next several minutes but produced very few shots on goal. Near the middle of the period, the Bobcats turned the puck over at their blueline and UConn was able to set up in the zone. After missing on their first chance, Hugh Larkin fired the puck top corner for Connecticut's first ever NCAA tournament goal. On the following attack, UConn was nearly able to double the lead but did end up forcing Travis Treloar into taking a slashing penalty. Quinnipiac's remade penalty kill was effective in keeping the Huskies to the outside and didn't give up a scoring chance on the disadvantage. Connecticut was able to get better chances once they were back at even strength but Silverstein was able to keep the puck out of the net. In the back half of the period, the Bobcat offense began to show signs of life but couldn't get much of a chance on the goal. Near the 5-minute mark, Quinnipiac made another mistake at its own blueline. Ethan Gardula was able to skate in alone and backhand the puck over the outstretched leg of Silverstein for the second goal of the match. After Quinnipiac was able to work the puck down low in the final minutes, Jake Richard was called for crosschecking to give the Bobcats their first power play of the game. With the #1 power play in the nation, Quinnipiac took the chance to get their first real scoring opportunity of the game but UConn's defense was able to prevent any further shots from getting on goal. Though they failed to score, the Bobcats' offense looked far better in the remaining few seconds and headed into the first intermission with momentum if nothing else.

The Huskies took control at the start of the second and Hudson Schandor had an open look right in front of the goal but Silverstein made the glove save. Kaden Shahan had another solo rush about a minute later but the puck rolled and he could only get a weak shot on goal. Quinnipiac tried to counter but they were unable to break through the UConn defense. Poor passing by the Bobcats did not help their efforts but Quinnipiac did eventually settle down and start to generate zone time in the Husky end. Connecticut battled back and kept the play mostly even until Jeremy Wilmer gloved the puck off of the faceoff and was handed a minor for the violation. It didn't take long for UConn to get a good chance at a goal but Silverstein's left toe made the stop on Richard. Just after the power play expired, UConn made a mistake just inside the Quinnipiac zone and gave up a 2-on-1 to the Bobcats Mason Marcellus made a brilliant backhand pass to Wilmer who lifted the puck over a sprawling Callum Tung to cut the lead in half. After a rush up the ice by Victor Czerneckianair, the two teams began to show some genuine dislike with some post-whistle roughhousing. While Quinnipiac looked like they had rediscovered their game, the team made a critical mistake when they turned over the puck down low. UConn fired the puck in from the point and it eventually found Fraser right in front of the goal who fired it past a helpless Silverstein to restore their lead. After the following faceoff, Quinnipiac went back on the attack and drew a penalty when John Spetz chopped down Elliott Groenewold's stick. UConn's penalty kill gave Quinnipiac fits, not only stopping the Bobcats from getting a good shot on goal but threatening to the Quinnipiac cage on more than one occasion. The Bobcats had better chances after their power play ended but they were unable to score again and ended the second still needing two goals.

Connecticut continued to press in the offensive zone from the start of the third. While they didn't get much in the way of scoring chances, their presence in the Bobcats' zone prevented Quinnipiac from getting their offense going. Eventually Jack Ricketts skated the puck up the ice and soon thereafter Wilmer briefly looked to have scored his second of the game but the puck hit the crossbar, bounced down behind Tung and was cleared by Viking Gustafsson Nyberg before it could roll into the goal. After the near-miss, Quinnipiac continued to probe away at the UConn defenses but the Huskies didn't give up any easy opportunities. Eventually, however, the constant attacking by the Bobcats resulted in Fraser taking an interference penalty. Quinnipiac's power play continued to have trouble finding a clear lane to the net and after a few turnovers again gave up the best chance to the Huskies. Just after the power play ended, Moore was tripped near the UConn net and kicked Tung in the head as he was going down. The netminder went down and was stunned momentarily but was able to continue after an injury stoppage. He was then immediately threatened after a UConn turnover but managed to made a glove save to preserve the 2-goal lead. Quinnipiac tried desperately to get something going offensively in the final 8 minutes but Connecticut refused to give an inch. With less then 4 minutes to play the Bobcats were finally able to get through to the UConn cage and nearly able to break through on a goal mouth scramble but Tung and the Husky defense held them back. Silverstein was pulled early for an extra attacker and the Bobcats were finally able to get something going when they had an additional player. With just over 2 minutes to play, Joey Muldowney cleared the puck down the ice. The disk was rolling, got on edge and curled into the Bobcat net to essentially end the match. The final seconds passed with both teams coming to that realization and it was UConn who could decisively claim the championship of the nutmeg state.

==== Regional final ====
March 30, 2025; 4:30 pm	(2) Connecticut	2–3 (OT) (1–1, 1–1, 0–0, 1–0)	(4) Penn State	PPL Center; Attendance: 6,933

Game reference

Callum Tung
Goalies
Arsenii Sergeev
Referees:
Ryan Hersey
Nathan Wieler
Linesmen:
Eric Contino
Tyler Liffrig

(Richard, Schandor) Joey Muldowney (29) – 3:09	1–0
	1–1	13:27 – Dane Dowiak (12) (Paquette, Peters)
(Gustafsson Nyberg, Spetz) Tabor Heaslip (8) – 31:27	2–1
	2–2	31:57 – J. J. Wiebusch (14) (Cerrato, Mack)
	2–3	77:56 – GW – Matt DiMarsico (17) (Cerrato)

4 min
Penalties
4 min
44
Shots
41

Game summary

=== Fargo Region ===
==== Regional semifinals ====
March 27, 2025; 4:00 pm	(1) Western Michigan	2–1 (2OT) (0–0, 1–0, 0–1, 0–0, 1–0)	(4) Minnesota State	Scheels Arena; Attendance: 4,817

Game reference

Hampton Slukynsky
Goalies
Alex Tracy
Referees:
Jim Curtin
Jeremy Tufts
Linesmen:
Kevin Briganti
Nick Briganti

(Michaels) Liam Valente (13) – PP – 20:48	1–0
	1–1	41:51 – Kaden Bohlsen (12) (Krajnik, Murr)
(Nehring, Valente) Grant Slukynsky (10) – GW – 87:14	2–1

2 min
Penalties
4 min
44
Shots
29

Game summary
The game started with a bang as both teams laid big hits on one another. The temperature cooled down a bit after the first minute but both squads skated up and down the ice as they looked for an early goal. During one such rush, WMU was able to turn the puck over in the Mavericks' end and, in reply, Jordan Power was called for tripping when he tried to prevent an open shot at his goal. Western had one of the best power plays in the country but MSU was able to match with a stelar kill. The few shots that made it through to Alex Tracy weren't too dangerous and Minnesota State was able to survive. The Mavericks turned defense to offense and immediately went on the attack. They were able to get a 3-on-2 but the Bronco defenders were able to limit them to a sharp-angle shot from the wall. Chances came fast and furious for both sides but both netminders looked to be on their respective games. A heavy hit by Campbell Cichosz on Owen Michaels in the corner looked to stun the Western forward but the Broncos were still able to tilt the ice towards the Mavericks' end in the middle of the period. Minnesota State was able to counter after WMU iced the puck but the Mavericks missed on a couple of passing plays and never ended up with a decent shot on goal. The fast and physical play continued and both benches called for penalties but the referees allowed play to continue. With about 6 minutes to go, MSU got on another odd-man rush but saw the opportunity go for naught when the play was blown dead for offsides. Minnesota State continued to let chances melt down and get low-percentage chances on goal but the continual puck possession in the WMU end prevented the Broncos from getting anything going in the later half of the period. The first real scoring opportunity came with two and half minutes left when Evan Murr launched an off-balance point shot that was deflected en route and just barely stopped by Hampton Slukynsky. Despite the up and down action, neither team took any real risks during the period until the waning seconds. Alex Bump was able to sneak past the MSU defense and streak in on Tracy. However, just as he was going to shoot, Adam Eisele slashed his stick and was called for a minor penalty. The first 16 seconds of the man-advantage did not produce any results with the rest being held over to the start of the second.

Western swiftly got the puck into the zone but had trouble getting through the MSU defense. After a blocked shot, the Mavericks collected the puck but failed to clear and the rubber bounced to Liam Valente. The Bronco forward then walked to the center of the right circle and beat Tracy high-glove for the opening goal. WMU continued to press after the goal and forced Minnesota State into a few turnovers but they were unable to capitalize. With Western taking over the balance of play MSU needed someone to change the momentum and that's exactly when they got when Brett Moravec went on a solo rush up the ice. After splitting to Bronco defenders, Moravec was slashed by Joona Väisänen to give the Mavericks their first power play of the match. Unfortunately for Minnesota State, their passing continued to be poor and Western ended up getting better chances. Even when the Mavs were able to set up a one-timer, Murr's stick snapped and the Broncso were able to clear. It was only at the very end of the man-advantage that MSU was able to generate a good scoring chance but a sprawling Slukynsky just managed to keep the puck out of the net. After the power play, the game reverted back to a back-and-forth match with both defenses preventing any good shots on goal. Around the mid point of the period, Western's offense began to exert itself once more but Tracy remained stout and kept the puck out of the net. MSU countered after a few minutes and Will Hillman was able to get a puck through Slukynsky but it bounded to the side of the goal. The Mavericks were able to apply some offensive pressure but, again, several opportunities went by the wayside thanks to inaccurate or deflected passes. With under 5 minutes to play, Brian Carrabes fired a shot from the point that just missed the far corner of the net past a screed Slukynsky. MSU kept the puck in the WMU end for much of the remaining time but continued to be plagued by bad passes. With just seconds left, Josh Groll skated into the slot and received a pass from behind the net. He launched a one-timer on goal but the shot was low and Slukynsky was able to make a leg save to keep the Mavericks off of the scoresheet.

After opening the period by icing the puck, Minnesota State was able to get its offense into gear and not only set up in the zone set up in the zone but finally get a good shot on goal. Slukynsky was able to stop the initial shot from Murr but the rebound from Zach Krajnik bounced up and was toward the goal off of a Bronco defender. As it was sliding towards the net, Kaden Bohlsen was the first one to reach the puck and he slammed it home to tie the match. End-to-end action persisted after the goal with both sides narrowly missing out on scoring chances. At around the 12-minute mark, Western appeared to commit a tripping penalty right in front of the Maverick net but neither referee made a call, much to the displeasure of Minnesota State. Fortunately for the Mavs, they were able to get control of the puck and push it back up the ice. With both teams not willing to take a risk and make a disastrous mistake, the game reverted to a tight-checking match but that didn't prevent the offenses from getting their chances. With about 9 minutes to play, MSU got on a late 2-on-1 but could not beat Slukynsky. Shortly afterwards, on a separate possession, Moravec attempted to lay a heavy hit on Bump but as the Bronco forward moved to avoid the check he caught a trailing leg and crashed to the ice. That play had the Western bench up in arms but the referees, perhaps as a makeup call, did not assess a penalty. Minnesota State continued to play physically, crashing into WMU players when the opportunities presented themselves and made use of the long leash provided by the refs. The final few minutes were played mostly in the Western end and Luigi Benincasa was nearly able to find the winning goal. With about 70 seconds left, The Maverick forward got a rebound right in front of the net and one-timed it towards the goal, the puck was rolling and he wasn't able to make good contact, causing the shot to just go off angle and bounce off of the far post. However, neither team could find the winning tally and overtime was needed.

Western Michigan went on the attack at the start of OT but MSU's defense didn't crack. The kept up their physical play and then countered but were unable to get the puck past Slukynsky. A few minutes into the period, MSU committed three consecutive icings. In order to give his players a breather, head coach Luke Strand used his timeout. On the ensuing faceoff, the Mavs got control of the puck and skated it up the ice to take the pressure off. Minnesota State then began to establish zone time and got several good looks on goal but Western's sturdy defense was able to block the puck away. Even though only a few shots got through, Slukynsky still had to stay on the top of his game and stop several high-percentage chances. The middle of the period was typified by tight defense with the refs allowing both teams to commit letter-of-the-law penalties without punishment. MSU was able to take advantage of this and tilt the puck towards the Western end but that didn't prevent the Broncos from having chances of their own. Off of a faceoff in the Maverick end, Bump wired a shot high on goal but Tracy blocked it with his shoulder. A little later the Purple goaltender was called upon again to stop Grant Slukynsky at the side of the net and kept the game going. With five and half left in the period, Western committed an icing. With the players already tired from a long shift, it was Pat Ferschweiler's turn to call a timeout. About a minute later, Bump was able to find a streaking Michaels who went in alone on the MSU net but Tracy was able to make a glove save on a low shot. Both defenses were instrumental in keeping the puck out of the net for the final three minutes as both teams continued to press. With just a few seconds left, Bump found a rebound in front of the Minnesota State crease but he had to rush the shot and Alex Trace telescoped out to made the save just before the end of the period.

Western again was the first to the attack at the beginning of the fifth period and almost was able to find the net just seconds into the session. MSU replied soon thereafter and had their own glorious chance halted by Slukynsky. A few minutes later, WMU coughed up the puck deep in their own end but Luc Wilson had the puck knocked off of his blade as he tried to stickhandle around the Bronco netminder. About a minute later, Western nearly found the net when Wyatt Schingoethe got the puck alone in front of the goal. Tracy made two toe saves before stopping Tim Washe on a third to save the team's season. With both teams growing increasingly fatigued, the hitting tailed off but MSU remained the more physical of the two. Nearing the middle of the period, Zach Nehring threw a weak shot on goal that Tracy was not able to collect. Grant Slukynsky backhanded the rebound which deflected off of Wilson into the net, ending the game.

March 27, 2025; 8:45 pm	(2) Minnesota	4–5 (OT) (2–1, 1–0, 1–3, 0–1)	(3) Massachusetts	Scheels Arena; Attendance: 4,816

Game reference

Liam Soulière (out 48:44, in 52:07)
Nathan Airey (in 48:44, out 52:07)
Goalies
Michael Hrabal
Referees:
Joe Carusone
Jason Williams
Linesmen:
Ryan Knapp
Adam Wood

(Rinzel, Koster) Jimmy Snuggerud (23) – PP – 14:14	1–0
	1–1	14:34 – Larry Keenan (4) (Lautenbach, Dell'Elce)
(unassisted) Brody Lamb (17) – 18:49	2–1
(Clark, Wood) Connor Kurth (18) – 34:07	3–1
	3–2	47:14 – Aydar Suniev (19) (Jenčko, Ölvestad)
	3–3	48:49 – Daniel Jenčko (6) (Murray, Ločmelis)
	3–4	55:07 – Francesco Dell'elce (7) (Connors, Jo. Musa)
(Moore) Jimmy Snuggerud (24) – 56:24	4–4
	4–5	64:49 – GW – Aydar Suniev (20) (Ločmelis)

4 min
Penalties
4 min
29
Shots
37

Game summary
With the game beginning more than an hour later than expected due to the earlier match going into double overtime, the start was a bit disjointed as the two teams had to shake off the cobwebs. While Minnesota was also having to contend with the absence of a few players due to illness, it was the Gophers who took controlled the game early. The first good chance of the night came when Jimmy Snuggerud broke in on the UMass goal but Michael Hrabal was able to make the save. The Minutemen answered with one of the own a minute later when Cole O'Hara tried to slip around behind Liam Soulière but the puck rolled off of his stick before he could shoot into an open net. The offenses bogged down in the middle of the period but Minnesota was still able to keep the puck in the Massachusetts end for long stretches. With few scoring chances being generated, the players occupied themselves with some pushing and shoving. As the speed of the game increased UMass got a few good chances on goal but Bo Cosman got a little too aggressive on the forecheck and was called for interference. On the ensuing power play, Snuggerud was able to corral the puck near the front of the net and Lucas Mercuri was forced to take a hooking minor to stop a golden scoring chance. Right off of the next faceoff, Matthew Wood was called for a trip to end revert the 2-man advantage back to just 1. With a ton of open ice, Minnesota was able to set up in the Massachusetts end and Snuggerud blasted a 50-foot shot past Hrabal for the opening goal. Just seconds later, Larry Keenan fired a puck in on Soulière who misread the trajectory and ended up deflecting it up into the top corner. The game see-sawed after the two quick goals but both defenses were able to force long-distance shots. Near the end of the period, Minnesota was able to spend some time in the Minutemen end and force an offensive zone faceoff. After Kenny Connors fumbled the draw, Brody Lamb snagged the puck and wired it into the near corner over Hrabal's shoulder. The end of the period saw a little more rough play but not enough to draw a penalty.

The Gophers picked right up where they left off and a screened point shot from Luke Mittelstadt eluded Hrabal but hit the crossbar and bounced away harmlessly. Massachusetts countered and went on the attack which included a bit of physical play as well. A few long shots reached Soulière but he didn't have too much difficulty making the saves. The two teams then went back and forth for several minutes to no real effect but, around the 12-minute mark, Minnesota generated a few scoring chances. Neither found its mark and UMass was able to get back to its game. Hrabal was forced to make another couple of saves a few minutes later when Minnesota titled the ice once more. With around 8 minutes to play, the Gophers got another good opportunity at the UMass cage. A net front scramble was halted by the Minutemen defense and Hrabal pounced on a loose puck to end the threat. Massachusetts tried to reply with a close-in shot of its own but Lautenbach's chance never fully materialized. A few minutes later Minnesota was able to get into the UMass end and, after failing on its initial chance, moved the puck to an open Connor Kurth in front. The Gopher forward pulled the puck around Hrabal and deposited a backhand into the cage. Now down by two, Massachusetts fought back and upped their forechecking game. After Jack Musa stole the puck in the Gopher end, Cal Thomas slashed him in response and was sent off for 2 minutes. UMass was able to set up their power play in the back half of the man-advantage and nearly ended up scoring on a melee in the goal crease but Soulière managed to keep the puck out and preserve Minnesota's 2-goal lead. The waning seconds passed with more jostling and jawing but, again, no further penalties.

The third began with the physical play continuing but UMass swiftly got to its offensive game. A few minutes in, the Minutemen had a pair of glorious chances; the first was stopped by Soulière's glove and the second rolled off Aydar Suniev's stick before he could get the puck around the sprawling netminder. Massachusetts had no real choice but to open up the game offensively while Minnesota did its level best to prevent any further scoring. The increased pressure eventually ended up with Suniev getting a pass from below the goal line just off to the right of the net and then shooting the puck past Soulière to the left. The Gophers were unhappy about the goal because an apparent tripping penalty down low went uncalled by the refs and led directly to Massachusetts getting its hands on the biscuit. After the fans voice their displeasure over another potential UMass penalty, Massachusetts went back on the attack. After Minnesota was forced into an icing, Soulière went over to the Gopher bench with an equipment problem and Nathan Airey was forced to take over in goal. Right after the ensuing faceoff, Daniel Jenčko deflected the puck past Airey to tie the game. The partisan crowd was silenced by the stunning turn of events and the Minutemen tried to take advantage. Minnesota was soon able to collect itself and countered with two chances from Kurth in tight. As the game stopped for a TV timeout around the 8-minute mark, Soulière returned to the Gopher crease. The teams then began to exchange chances and UMass got a great chance with about 5 minutes to play but was unable to get the shot on goal. A moment later, a pass into the slot from Francesco Dell'Elce was deflected into the top corner of the Gopher cage off of Jimmy Clark's stick. Minnesota was now forced to restart its offence with just 5 minutes to play or their season was over. It took just over a minute for Snuggerud to grab the puck off of a faceoff, skate towards the center of the ice and fire the puck past three Minutemen to tie the match. The goal revitalized the Gophers who began to pressure UMass on both ends of the ice. Massachusetts, however, was undaunted and a hit into the boards by Keenan on Mason Nevers demonstrated as much. Neither team could find another goal before time expired so overtime was needed to settle the score.

Snuggerud tried to end the match early but his hard shot missed the net. Massachusetts then had a few chances of their own that failed to connect. When possession switched back to the Gophers, a shot from Kurth hit off the top of Hrabal's mask and stunned to netminder but he soon recovered and remained in the game. About a minute later the Minnesota faithful groaned when what they believed was an obvious tripping call was let go. The play helped UMass turn over the puck which was then skated up the ice and swiftly deposited into the goal for the winning tally. An angry buzz persisted through the building after the winner but Suniev's second of the night was allowed to stand as the deciding goal. A few objects were thrown onto the ice as the two teams shook hands while Bob Motzko, Minnesota's coach, was visibly angry at the referees.

==== Regional final ====
March 29, 2025; 5:30 pm	(1) Western Michigan	2–1 (0–1, 1–0, 1–0)	(3) Massachusetts	Scheels Arena; Attendance: 4,329

Game reference

Hampton Slukynsky
Goalies
Michael Hrabal
Referees:
Brady Johnson
Bobby Lukkason
Linesmen:
Nathan Voll
Tyler Landman

	0–1	8:50 – Dans Ločmelis (8) (Jenčko, Alger)
(Sjölund, Michaels) Liam Valente (14) – PP – 38:35	1–1
(Kramer, Väisänen) Tim Washe (16) – GW PP – 42:47	2–1

9 min
Penalties
17 min
30
Shots
29

Game summary

=== Frozen Four – St. Louis, Missouri ===
==== National semifinal ====
April 10, 2025; 4:00 pm	(F1) Western Michigan	3–2 (2OT) (0–0, 2–0, 0–2, 0–0, 1–0)	(M3) Denver	Enterprise Center; Attendance: 16,814

Game reference

Hampton Slukynsky
Goalies
Matt Davis
Referees:
Jeremy Tufts
Geoff Miller
Linesmen:
Kevin Briganti
Nick Briganti

(Washe) Brian Kramer (2) – PP – 26:16	1–0
(unassisted) Owen Michaels (15) – 34:32	2–0
	2–1	46:49 – Aidan Thompson (21) (Ashcroft, Brown)
	2–2	57:21 – Jared Wright (21) (Pohlkamp)
(Costantini, Väisänen) Owen Michaels (16) – GW – 80:26	3–2

4 min
Penalties
6 min
47
Shots
22

Game summary
Western started fast, causing a turnover in front of the benches and then attacking Denver's cage. After the puck was thrown behind the net, it bounce out the other side, forcing Matt Davis to make a tough save. He was unable to control the rebound and the puck hopped out into the open. Davis then slipped and was unable to regain the net. Zach Nehring had a wide open shot at the goal but the puck was on edge and his shot hit the crossbar and bounced away harmlessly. The pace cooled down afterwards as both teams appeared a bit nervous, particularly after the fireworks in the first minute. Only 2 shots were recorded in the first 5 minutes between the two clubs as the two NCHC rivals probed one another for weaknesses. The defenses on both sides was effective on the backcheck, melting down attacks by both sides and stopping any shots from getting on goal for several minutes. By the middle of the period, there were only 3 shots on goal in what was a tight-checking affair to that point. In the back half of the period the game began to open up and, within a minute, Kieran Cebrian was called for boarding to give Western Michigan the game's first power play. The Broncos were able to set up immediately and put pressure on the Denver goal but after a few saves from Davis, the Pioneers were able to clear the zone. After setting up a second time, Western was able to put the puck on goal several more times but Davis managed to stop all 5 shots on the power play. After killing off the penalty, Denver began to attack and were able to generate their first real scoring chance at about the 15-minute mark. Hampton Slukynsky was able to close his five-hole in time and send the Broncos up the ice on a counterattack. Western's shot was stopped by Davis but he was unable to find the puck. Fortunately for Denver, the rubber dropped straight down and when WMU took a shot at the loose puck it was easily stopped by Davis' left pad. During the ensuing play, there was a bit of a comical moment when several players got into a rugby scrum just inside the Denver blueline. With the puck pinned to the boards, the players locked their skated together stat stationary for several seconds. The referees yelled at them that they were not blowing the whistle and forced the two sides to sort the situation out for themselves. About a minute later, Alex Bump was able to get a hard one-timer on goal from the top of the circle but Davis made a spectacular glove save and kept the game scoreless. After a bit of back-and-forth, Eric Pohlkamp grabbed the puck and weaved his way through half a dozen skaters and fired a hard shot that Slukynsky stopped. The attempt came with just seconds to play in the period and was only Denver's third shot of the frame.

Western again got a jump on the puck at the start of the second. Bump's fourth shot of the game hit Davis in the mask, knocking it loose and drawing a whistle. Denver tried to get their offense going in response but the pressure by WMU at both ends of the ice prevented the Pioneers from holding the puck long enough to generate a scoring chance. After forcing a turnover in the Denver end, Western Michigan threatened Davis once more but Denver's was quickly able to recover. As the play continued, Bump was handed a slashing call to give Denver its first opportunity on the man-advantage. With the #3 power play in the nation, Denver had a glorious chance to get the game's opening goal, however, Western Michigan was no slouch on special teams with the #4 penalty kill. The Pioneers were able to spend most of the time in the WMU end but the Broncos were largely able to keep Denver to the outside. A little after the penalty expired, Samu Salminen took a rather poor holding penalty behind his own net and put Western back on the power play. Poor puck management cost Western Michigan the first 30 seconds of the power play but after Denver's clearing attempt went into the bench, Western got a reprieve and scored off the ensuing faceoff into the far corner. Brian Kramer, a graduate transfer, scored just his scored goal of the year from the high slot to give WMU the first lead of the match. Western did not let up after the goal and continued to press Denver all over the ice. Just before the middle of the period, the puck came to the front of the Denver cage and was stopped by Davis. The netminder was then pushed into the goal and Western began celebrating a second tally, however, the referees immediately ruled the play dead. Upon review, the call was upheld and the score remained 1–0. Western Michigan continued to besiege Davis and kept the Pioneers on their heels. After a few minutes, Denver was able to get a lucky bounce and get a couple of open looks no goal but Slukynsky was able to stop both Aidan Thompson and Jared Wright. A few minutes later, Zeev Buium was retrieving a puck behind his net with Wyatt Schingoethe hot on his heels. When Buium tried to avoid the check, Schingoethe's leg caught him in the ankle and caused the speedy defenseman to crumple to the ice. Buium was able to skate off under his own power but was definitely feeling the effects of the hit. Moments later, as Denver was trying to exit their zone, Bump laid his stick on Thompson, knocking him to the ice. While Denver was yelling for a penalty, the puck slid right to Owen Michaels. The sophomore skated in a few feet and launched a shot by Davis' ear right into the far corner for the second goal of the game. During the ensuing play, Tim Washe was sent in on Davis with a breakaway but the Denver goaltender kept his team in the match by making the save. After the following faceoff, Iiro Hakkarainen was called for hooking to give Denver's man-advantage a second opportunity. Despite good puck movement, Denver was not able to get a shot on goal. Instead, Matteo Costantini was able to turn the puck over at his own blueline and break in on Davis. The netminder was forced to make two massive saves on the Ontario native as well as another later from Washe and a further chance by Bump just as the penalty was expiring. Western ended up outshooting the Pioneers while on the penalty kill as a demonstration of just how in control of the game the Broncos were. Even when Denver was able to get a turnover late in the period, WMU's defense was able to quickly respond and stop the puck before it got to the net. At the end of 40 minutes, Western led with 32 shots to just 8 for Denver.

With Denver in a precarious position, the team altered their style of play by leaning more towards the offensive end. The Pioneers were able to generate a decent scoring chance in the first minute of the period, but they also opened up their zone for Western's offense. in the third minute, that resulted in the Broncos getting another chance on goal where Davis was unable to control the rebound but fortune remained with the Pioneer netminder and the puck remained between his legs. Denver's counter resulted in another shot on Slukynsky but no follow up. Just prior to the 5-minute mark, Hagen Burrows clipped Michaels in the helmet with his stick and gave Western a third power play. The Broncos did not have the same urgency as they had on their first two chances and Denver managed to kill off the penalty with relative ease. Shortly afterwards, Denver was able to get into the WMU zone with possession and move the puck around to Thompson in the right circle. His initial shot was blocked by Samuel Sjölund but the rebound came right back to Thompson and he sent a fluttering shot past an over-extended Slukynsky to cut the lead in half. The goal appeared to breathe life back into the Pioneers and Denver suddenly began to pressure Western. After a little more back-and-forth, Denver got into the WMU end past the midpoint of the period and got several good looks at the net but were unable to get the puck past Slukynsky. Denver continued to search and probe for the tying goal but the Bronco defenders continued to hold them off. As time kept ticking away on Denver's season, the Pioneers were constantly on the attack and, with less then 3 minutes to play, Pohlkamp fired a hard shot on goal from the top of the circle. Slukynsky made the initial save but the puck bounced out and dropped into the crease. In a melee of four skaters, Wright was able to poke the puck between Slukynsky's legs and tie the game. However, Western challenged for goaltender interference, believing that Slukynsky had been pushed just prior to the goal. After a review, the goal was allowed to stand much to the displeasure of the Broncos. With the game not tied, Western Michigan now had to rouse its offense that had taken off most of the third period. Denver remained on the attack, looking for the winning goal in regulation. Neither side was able to find the back of the net again and, for the third consecutive meeting, the two would need overtime to settle the account.

Denver took charge at the start of overtime but Western was able to prevent any good scoring chance from occurring. Through a combination of backchecking and shot-blocking, the Pioneers were unable to get a puck on goal for the first few minutes but were still directing the pace of play. As the period progressed, Western Michigan slowly took charge and began to tilt the ice back towards Davis. Denver continued to fight back but the Broncos were able to find Bump right in front of the net at the 8-minute mark but when he slapped at the loose puck it was fluttering in the air and went well wide of the half-open cage. A few minutes later, Denver was able to get a long shot on goal and force Slukynsky to save the rebound. The puck then was laying right in front of the goal but Western jumped on the puck and skated it out of danger. A short time later, Buium danced through the entire WMU defense but his shot was blocked by Cole Crusberg-Roseen. On the counterattack, Buium then deflected a shot from Michaels that nearly found its way into his own cage. About a minute later, Western nearly ended the game when Washe tried to find Hakkarainen in off to the side of the net. The puck was stopped by the skate of Rieger Lorenz but was then almost slid under a sprawling Davis before he managed to cover and freeze the puck. The pace picked up with both teams trying to end the match quickly but the two netminders were not accommodating. The two sides exchanged scoring chances for several minutes but could not get the puck into the net. With about 2 minutes to play, Buium was again involved in a collision where he attempted to avoid a check but was caught in the leg. Denver again screamed for a penalty but none was forthcoming. Western was able to get a 2-on-1 as a result but Davis made the save on Bump. In the end, 80 minutes was not enough and for the first time in 29 years, a Frozen Four game went into double overtime.

Western was able to get control of the puck at the start of the fifth period and, less than 30 seconds into the frame, Costantini found Michaels in the high slot for the winning goal.

April 10, 2025; 7:30 pm	(T2) Boston University	3–1 (0–0, 2–0, 1–1)	(A4) Penn State	Enterprise Center; Attendance: 16,814

Game reference

Mikhail Yegorov
Goalies
Arsenii Sergeev
Referees:
Ryan Hersey
Nathan Wieler
Linesmen:
Tyler Liffrig
Erik Contino

(Copponi) Jack Hughes (7) – 21:35	1–0
(C. Hutson, Kaplan) Cole Eiserman (24) – 30:44	2–0
	2–1	42:15 – Nicholas DeGraves (4) (Schoen, Mack)
(Willander, Hughes) Jack Harvey (11) – EN – 59:01	3–1

4 min
Penalties
6 min
33
Shots
33

Game summary

==== National Championship ====
April 12, 2025; 6:30 pm	Western Michigan	6–2 (2–1, 1–1, 3–0)	Boston University	Enterprise Center; Attendance: 16,953

Game reference
Referees: Cameron Lynch; CJ Hanafin; Linesmen: John Rey; Patrick Dapuzzo

Scoring summary
Period	Team	Goal	Assist(s)	Time	Score
1st	WMU	Wyatt Schingoethe (5)	Hakkarainen, Washe	1:38	1–0 WMU
1st	BU	Cole Eiserman (25)	Kaplan, Bednarik	7:12	1–1
1st	WMU	Cole Crusberg-Roseen (3)	unassisted	15:01	2–1 WMU
2nd	WMU	Ty Henricks (8) – GW	Knuble, Szydlowski	25:18	3–1 WMU
2nd	BU	Shane Lachance (12) – PP	Greene, C. Hutson	30:42	3–2 WMU
3rd	WMU	Owen Michaels (17)	Väisänen	47:16	4–2 WMU
3rd	WMU	Iiro Hakkarainen (13)	Schingoethe, Washe	56:02	5–2 WMU
3rd	WMU	Owen Michaels (18) – EN		57:52	6–2 WMU
Penalty summary
Period	Team	Player	Penalty	Time	PIM
1st	BU	Quinn Hutson	Hooking	9:33	2:00
2nd	WMU	Brian Kramer	Holding	30:26	2:00
2nd	WMU	Ty Henricks	Slashing	35:40	2:00
2nd	BU	Devin Kaplan	Kneeing	38:14	2:00

Shots by period
Team	1	2	3	T
Western Michigan	9	9	10	28
Boston University	8	8	10	26

Goaltenders
Team	Name	Saves	Goals against	Time on ice
WMU	Hampton Slukynsky	24	2	59:26
BU	Mikhail Yegorov	22	5	58:21

Game summary

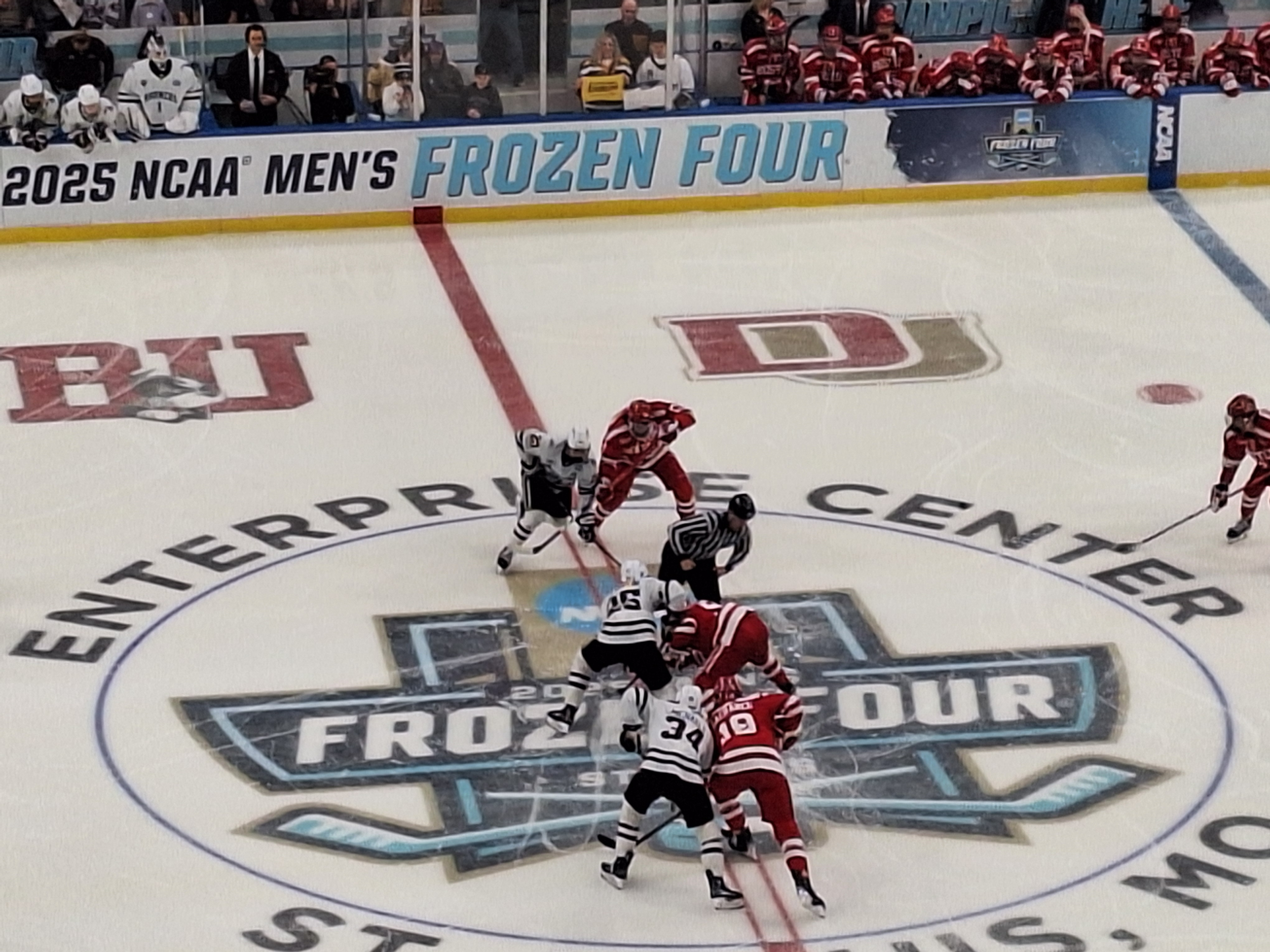
Opening face-off from the finals

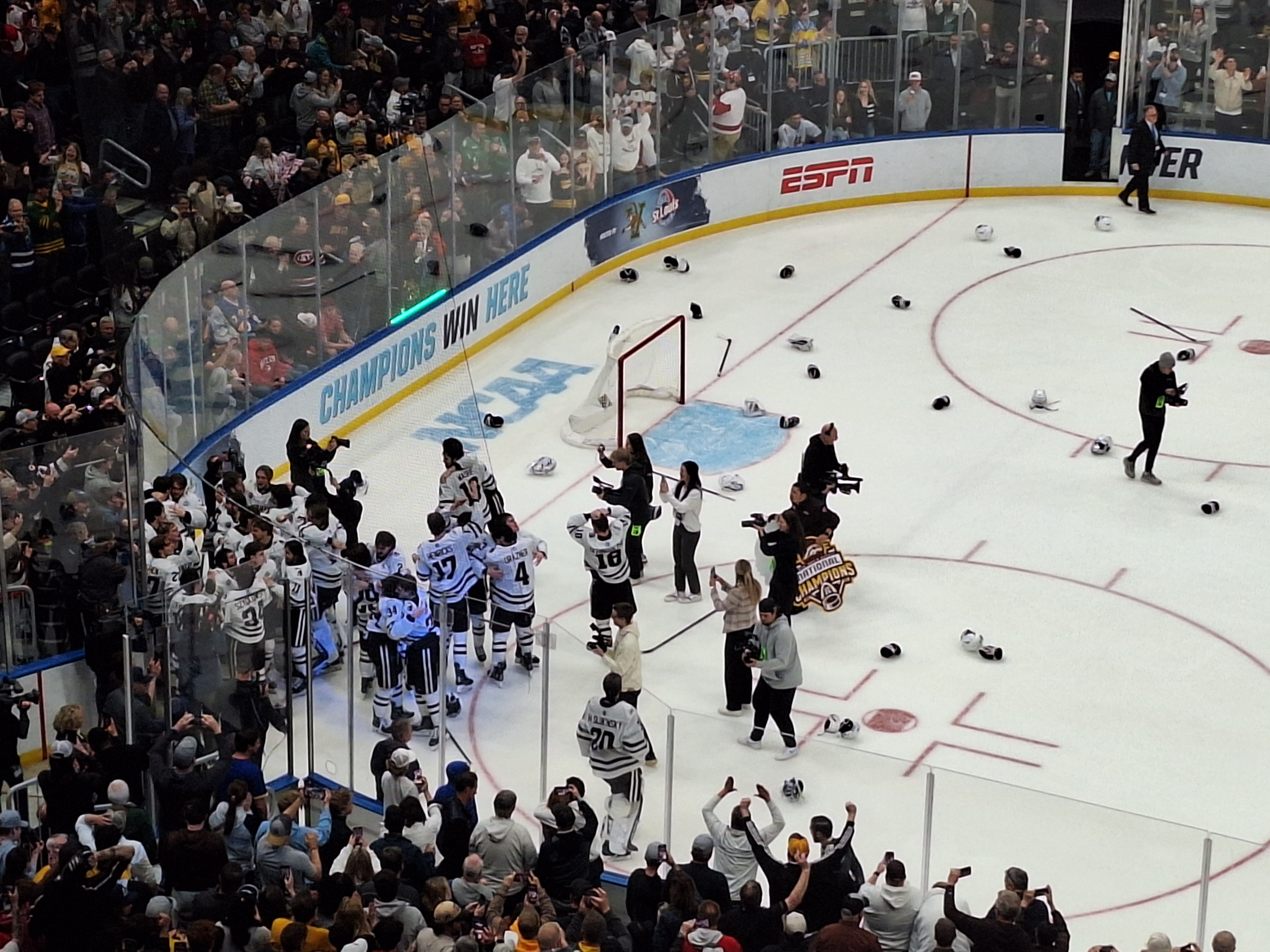
Post-game celebration

== Tournament awards ==
=== All-Tournament team ===
- G: Hampton Slukynsky (Western Michigan)
- D: Zeev Buium (Denver)
- D: Joona Väisänen (Western Michigan)
- F: Cole Eiserman (Boston University)
- F: Owen Michaels* (Western Michigan)
- F: Tim Washe (Western Michigan)

* Most Outstanding Player

== Record by conference ==
Conference	Bids	Record	Win %	Regional Finals	Frozen Four	Championship Game	National Champions
NCHC	2	6–1	.857	2	2	1	1
Hockey East	6	6–6	.500	4	1	1	–
Big Ten	4	2–4	.333	1	1	–	–
ECAC	2	1–2	.333	1	–	–	–
AHA	1	0–1	.000	–	–	–	–
CCHA	1	0–1	.000	–	–	–	–

== Media ==
=== Television ===
ESPN had US television rights to all games during the tournament for the twentieth consecutive year. ESPN aired each game either on ESPN2, ESPNU, or ESPN+.

==== Broadcast assignments ====
Regionals

- Toledo Regional: Kevin Gehl and Sean Ritchlin – Toledo, Ohio
- Fargo Regional: Roxy Bernstein and Ben Clymer – Fargo, North Dakota
- Allentown Regional: Jason Ross Jr. and Kevin Weekes – Allentown, Pennsylvania
- Manchester Regional: John Buccigross, Colby Cohen, and Quint Kessenich – Manchester, New Hampshire

Frozen Four

- John Buccigross, Colby Cohen, and Quint Kessenich – St. Louis, Missouri

=== Radio ===
Westwood One has exclusive radio rights to the Frozen Four and will broadcast both the semifinals and the championship.

- Brian Tripp, Dave Starman, and Shireen Saski

== See also ==
- 2025 NCAA Division I women's ice hockey tournament
- 2025 NCAA Division III men's ice hockey tournament
