= Dalton Bancroft =

Canadian ice hockey player (born 2001)

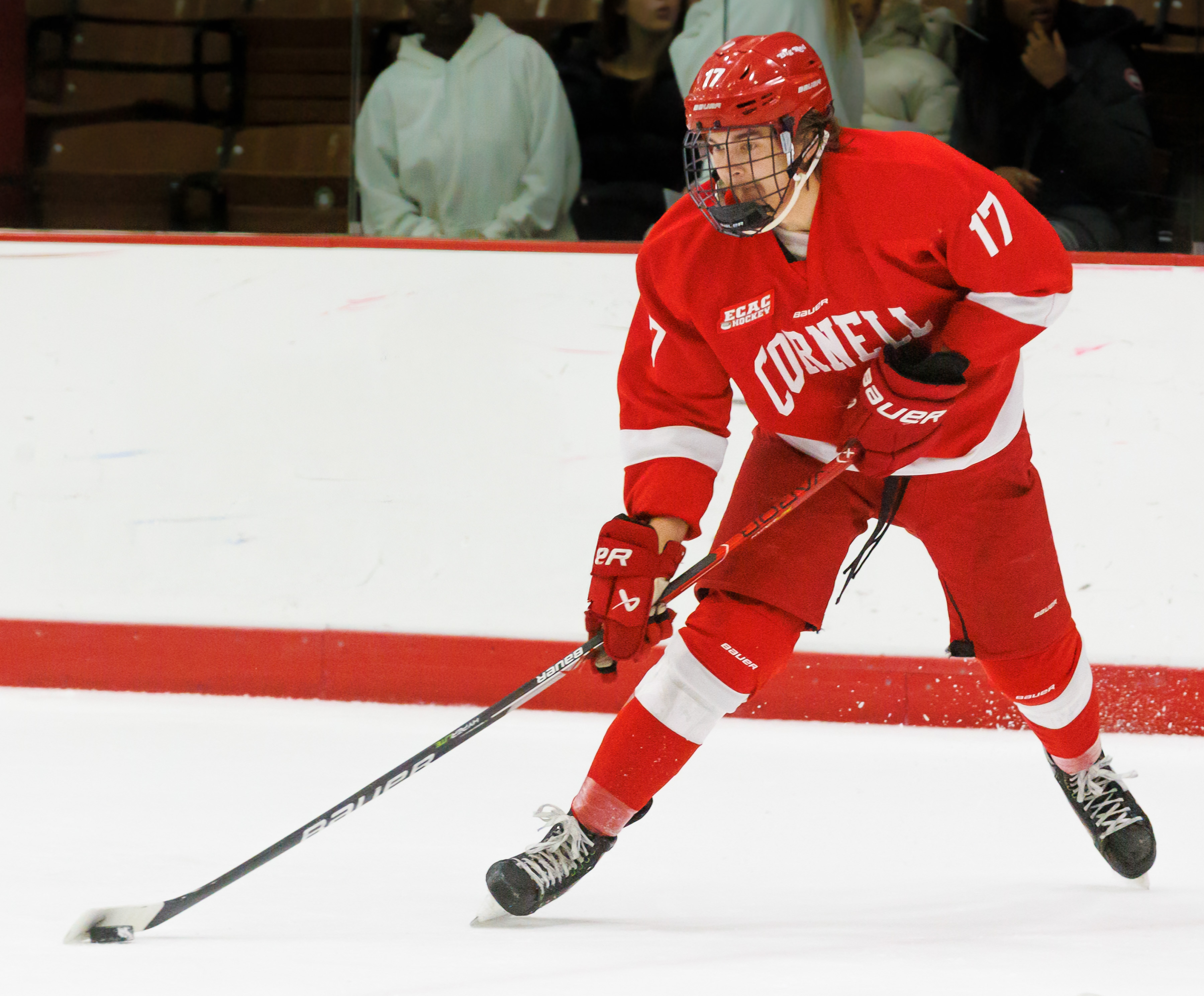
- Bancroft with Cornell in 2023
- Born: February 26, 2001 (age 25) Madoc, Ontario, Canada
- Height: 6 ft 3 in (191 cm)
- Weight: 207 lb (94 kg; 14 st 11 lb)
- Position: Right wing
- Shoots: Right
- ECHL team: Reading Royals
- NHL draft: Undrafted
- Playing career: 2025–present

Dalton Spencer Bancroft (born February 26, 2001) is a Canadian professional ice hockey forward who currently plays for the Reading Royals of the ECHL. He played college ice hockey at Cornell.

== Playing career ==
=== Collegiate ===
Bancroft committed to play for the Cornell Big Red starting with the 2022–23 season.

Bancroft had a successful first season with the Big Red. He led all freshmen on the team with 21 points, which was fifth overall on the team. He also was second in goals with nine. He scored a hat-trick in the Frozen Apple game against the UConn Huskies. He also scored a goal in Cornell's 4–0 upset of No. 1 ranked Quinnipiac in January. In early February, he was named to the Tim Taylor Award watchlist as the top freshman in the NCAA. The award would later go to Adam Fantilli. In the 2023 ECAC tournament, Bancroft would help the Big Red advance to the semifinals, registering an assist in both wins against Clarkson in the quarterfinal round. However, Cornell would get shutout and lose to Harvard in overtime, 1–0. However, the Big Red would earn an at-large bid to the 2023 NCAA tournament. After upsetting the defending champions Denver Pioneers in the first round, the Big Red would fall to the Boston University Terriers in the quarterfinals, with Bancroft scoring the lone goal for Cornell in the final minute.

Bancroft and the Big Red would enter the 2023–24 season with big expectations, and they would live up to those expectations. Bancroft improved his offensive totals from the previous season, scoring 12 goals and 19 assists for 31 points. The Big Red would enter the 2024 ECAC tournament as the No. 2 seed, and they would play like it. The Big Red exerted their revenge on Harvard in the quarterfinals, then proceeded to beat Dartmouth and St. Lawrence Saints en route to winning the tournament and earning an automatic bid to the 2024 NCAA tournament. Bancroft had four assists in the tournament run, including two in the championship game. Cornell would face off against Maine in the first round, who they would beat 3–1. They would rematch with Denver the following round, however, the Pioneers would get their revenge for the previous year, and win 2–1. Bancroft went scoreless in the two games. After the season, Bancroft was named to the ECAC Hockey Third Team for his efforts.

Cornell would look to build off their success in the 2024–25 season. Bancroft would once again raise his goal total, this time scoring 15 goals, which was second on the team. Cornell would enter the 2025 ECAC Hockey men's tournament as the No. 6 seed with a tough path to repeat. However, the Big Red didn't mind. After beating #11 Yale in the first round, they first upset #3 Colgate in two games in the quarterfinal, with Bancroft scoring a goal and assist in the clinching game. They would then beat No. 1 Quinnipiac in overtime, with Bancroft assisting on the game-winner, to advance to the finals for the second season in a row. Cornell would beat Clarkson 3–1 to win their second straight ECAC title, and once again clinching an auto-bid to the 2025 NCAA Tournament. Cornell entered the tournament as the second-lowest season, at No. 15. They would draw an opening round game against #2 Michigan State as heavy underdogs. However, Bancroft and the Big Red didn't care, as with ten seconds remaining, the Big Red scored the go-ahead goal to upset the Spartans, advancing to the second round to play Boston University. The Big Red would drag the Terriers to overtime, where they would fall 3-2 and end the cinderella run.

=== Professional ===
After Cornell's elimination from the NCAA Tournament, Bancroft became a highly touted free agent. On April 3, 2025, Bancroft signed a one-year entry-level contract with the Boston Bruins of the National Hockey League (NHL), and would report to their American Hockey League (AHL) affiliate, the Providence Bruins for the rest of the season on an amateur tryout.

After five games with the Bruins, on April 21, 2025, Bancroft was released from his ATO with the Bruins, returning to Cornell to finish out the academic year. He scored one goal in the five games.

Bancroft entered his first professional season hoping to produce offensively with Providence, but was unable to do so. Through 34 games with the P-Bruins, Bancroft only managed to score a goal and an assist. On March 12, 2026, ahead of the 2026 AHL trade deadline, Bancroft was traded to the Nashville Predators, alongside Massimo Rizzo, in exchange for Navrin Mutter. In 15 games with Nashville's AHL affiliate, the Milwaukee Admirals, Bancroft scored four assists. He went scoreless in two playoff games before the Admirals were eliminated by the Manitoba Moose.

After the season, the Predators did not extend a qualifying offer to Bancroft, making him an unrestricted free agent. On September 21, 2026, Bancroft joined the Lehigh Valley Phantoms, AHL affiliate of the Philadelphia Flyers, on a professional tryout agreement. On October 5, Bancroft signed with the Reading Royals, their ECHL affiliate.

== Personal life ==
Bancroft is the son of Steve Bancroft, who was drafted 21st overall by the Toronto Maple Leafs, and played six NHL games between the Chicago Blackhawks and San Jose Sharks.

== Career statistics ==
Bold indicates led league

| | | | Regular season | | | | | Playoffs |
| Season | Team | League | GP | G | A | Pts | PIM | GP | G | A | Pts | PIM |
|---|---|---|---|---|---|---|---|---|---|---|---|---|
| 2016–17 | Trenton Golden Hawks | OJHL | 1 | 0 | 0 | 0 | 0 | — | — | — | — | — |
| 2017–18 | St. Marys Lincolns | GOJHL | 42 | 21 | 18 | 39 | 42 | — | — | — | — | — |
| 2017–18 | Trenton Golden Hawks | OJHL | 2 | 0 | 0 | 0 | 0 | 4 | 0 | 0 | 0 | 0 |
| 2018–19 | Wellington Dukes | OJHL | 18 | 2 | 4 | 6 | 10 | — | — | — | — | — |
| 2018–19 | Trenton Golden Hawks | OJHL | 33 | 5 | 9 | 14 | 10 | 6 | 1 | 0 | 1 | 18 |
| 2019–20 | Trenton Golden Hawks | OJHL | 41 | 20 | 21 | 41 | 18 | 5 | 2 | 7 | 9 | 16 |
| 2020–21 | Amherst Ramblers | MJAHL | 22 | 14 | 11 | 25 | 8 | 5 | 4 | 2 | 6 | 2 |
| 2021–22 | Trenton Golden Hawks | OJHL | 54 | 37 | 55 | **92** | 56 | 3 | 2 | 4 | 6 | 0 |
| 2022–23 | Cornell University | ECAC | 33 | 9 | 12 | 21 | 19 | — | — | — | — | — |
| 2023–24 | Cornell University | ECAC | 34 | 12 | 19 | 31 | 25 | — | — | — | — | — |
| 2024–25 | Cornell University | ECAC | 36 | 15 | 12 | 27 | 48 | — | — | — | — | — |
| 2024–25 | Providence Bruins | AHL | 5 | 1 | 0 | 1 | 0 | — | — | — | — | — |
| 2025–26 | Providence Bruins | AHL | 34 | 1 | 1 | 2 | 30 | — | — | — | — | — |
| 2025–26 | Milwaukee Admirals | AHL | 15 | 0 | 4 | 4 | 0 | 2 | 0 | 0 | 0 | 0 |
| AHL totals | | | 54 | 2 | 5 | 7 | 30 | 2 | 0 | 0 | 0 | 0 |

== Awards and honors ==
| Award | Year |
OJHL
| First All-Star Team | 2021-22 |
| OJHL MVP | 2021-22 |
College
| All-ECAC Third Team | 2023–24 |
