= Owen Michaels =

American ice hockey player (born 2002)

- Michaels (right, as Western Michigan captain) and Ben Dexheimer (left, as Wisconsin captain) participate in ceremonial puck drop during the 2025 Holiday Face–Off
- Born: May 1, 2002 (age 24) Northville, Michigan, U.S.
- Height: 6 ft 1 in (185 cm)
- Weight: 184 lb (83 kg; 13 st 2 lb)
- Position: Forward
- Shoots: Right
- NHL team: Edmonton Oilers
- NHL draft: Undrafted
- Playing career: 2026–present

Owen Michaels (born May 1, 2002) is an American professional ice hockey player who is a forward for the Edmonton Oilers of the National Hockey League (NHL).

== Playing career ==
=== College ===
Michaels began his college ice hockey career for Western Michigan during the 2023–24 season. During his freshman year, he recorded two goals and five assists in 38 games. He scored his first career goal on November 3, 2023, in a game against Omaha.

During the 2024–25 season, in his sophomore year, he recorded 18 goals and 18 assists in 42 games. During the national semifinal of the 2025 NCAA Division I men's ice hockey tournament against Denver, he scored the game-winning goal in double-overtime to help Western Michigan advance to their first championship game. During the championship game against Boston University, he scored two goals to help Western Michigan win their first national championship in program history. He was subsequently named to the NCAA All-Tournament team and tournament Most Outstanding Player.

=== Professional ===
On April 2, 2026, Michaels signed a one-year, entry-level contract with the Edmonton Oilers, to begin during the remainder of the 2025–26 NHL season. He made his NHL debut on September 29, 2026, a 6-5 overtime loss to the Vancouver Canucks. Due to rule changes in the NHL making neck guards mandatory for players debuting in the 2026-27 season and onwards, Michaels was the first player in Oilers history required to wear a neck guard. On October 1, 2026, Michaels scored his first NHL goal in a 9-7 win over the same Canucks team.

== Personal life ==
Michaels was born to Dan and Judy Michaels and has two older sisters, Bridget and Maggie. His father played college baseball at Western Michigan and won the 1989 MAC championship.

== Career statistics ==
			Regular season					Playoffs
Season	Team	League	GP	G	A	Pts	PIM	GP	G	A	Pts	PIM
2018–19	Lincoln Stars	USHL	2	0	0	0	2	—	—	—	—	—
2019–20	Lincoln Stars	USHL	46	6	10	16	18	—	—	—	—	—
2020–21	Bismarck Bobcats	NAHL	44	3	18	21	20	6	1	3	4	4
2021–22	Bismarck Bobcats	NAHL	47	11	21	32	116	5	1	0	1	14
2022–23	Dubuque Fighting Saints	USHL	46	15	11	26	91	5	3	5	8	0
2023–24	Western Michigan University	NCHC	38	2	5	7	10	—	—	—	—	—
2024–25	Western Michigan University	NCHC	42	18	18	36	6	—	—	—	—	—
2025–26	Western Michigan University	NCHC	39	13	13	26	6	—	—	—	—	—
NCAA totals			119	33	36	69	22	—	—	—	—	—

== Awards and honors ==
Award	Year
College
NCAA All-Tournament Team	2025
NCAA Tournament MVP	2025

Awards and achievements
Preceded by Matt Davis	NCAA Tournament Most Outstanding Player; 2025	Succeeded by Johnny Hicks
