= 2023–24 Colorado College Tigers men's ice hockey season =

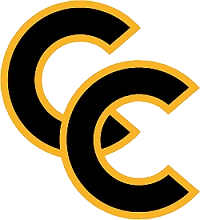
- Conference: T–3rd NCHC
- Home ice: Ed Robson Arena

Rankings
- USCHO: #15
- USA Hockey: #15

Record
- Overall: 21–13–3
- Conference: 14–8–2
- Home: 12–8–2
- Road: 9–5–1

Coaches and captains
- Head coach: Kris Mayotte
- Assistant coaches: Peter Mannino; John Lidgett; Andrew Oglevie
- Captain: Logan Will
- Alternate captains: Ray Christy; Stan Cooley; Jack Millar

The 2023–24 Colorado College Tigers men's ice hockey season was the 84th season of play for the program and the 11th in the NCHC. The Tigers represented Colorado College in the 2023–24 NCAA Division I men's ice hockey season, played their home games at the Ed Robson Arena and were coached by Kris Mayotte, in his 3rd season.

== Season ==
After narrowly missing out on a conference championship the year before, the team's goaltending situation was addressed by returning starter Kaidan Mbereko. The team's biggest task was to improve its scoring. Having had one of the lowest-scoring offenses in the nation in '23, Colorado College entered this season by losing its top scorer and more than a quarter of its goals. The team needed to see improvements from across the board to end its decade-plus of losing seasons. Noah Laba, who had finished second in scoring the year before, took over as the primary threat for the Tigers and became a 20-goal scorer for CC. The team also got a boost from Gleb Veremyev who appeared to be recovered from a torn ACL.

The team looked strong in October, beginning the season 5–0 for the first time since 2005. However, the next month proved that the team still had some problems to fix. The Tigers slumped over a 9-game span, only managing to win two games against Miami, the worst team in the conference. Mbereko was a little shaky during the stretch but it was the lack of offense that doomed CC. In the six games they played against ranked teams, the Tigers managed just 5 goals and were shutout twice. If Colorado College had any pretentions of being a contender for the NCAA tournament they would have to find a way to win against good teams.

Just before the winter break, CC travelled up to face North Dakota who was then the #1 team in the country. Defying their recent struggles, Colorado College overcame a 2-goal deficit to win in overtime thanks to Laba's 7th of the season. The Tigers appeared to be strengthened by the win and fought even harder in the rematch, this time with Veremyev netting the winning goal. As the team headed into its mid-season vacation, the road sweep of the Fighting Hawks completely altered the fortunes of the Tigers. Upon the team's return to the ice, Mbereko found a new level and become one of the top goaltenders in the nation. From mid-January through early March, Mbereko allowed more than 2 goals in just two games and his stellar play enabled the team to go 9–2–2 in that span.

CC rocketed up the rankings and at the end of the regular season, they were sitting 11th in the PairWise. With the club all but guaranteed a spot in the NCAA tournament, all the Tigers needed to do was win their semifinal match against Omaha and they'd make their first postseason appearance since 2011. However, the Mavericks were also playing for the lives and played desperate in the first game. CC found itself down by 3 goals in the second period but a stellar game from their special teams enabled the Tigers to tie the game and win it in overtime. After Omaha countered with a win in the rematch, the season came down to the deciding game three. Klāvs Veinbergs got CC a lead in the first but the rest of the offense was silent in the game. Despite a strong defensive effort, Omaha took the lead in the third and Colorado College was unable to respond.

Despite the loss, the Tigers still had a chance to make the NCAA tournament. They had dropped to 14th in the PairWise but that was still good enough to receive an at-large bid if events broke their way over the final weekend. All the Tigers needed was for either Quinnipiac to win the ECAC Hockey title, North Dakota to win the NCHC title, or Boston College to lose in the Hockey East championship game and, so long as there were no other upsets, the Tigers would make the field of 16. Unfortunately, none of those events came to pass. Both Quinnipiac and North Dakota lost in their respective semifinal games while Boston College won their championship. The final rankings put Massachusetts .0004 points ahead of CC for the last spot in the tournament and left the Tigers out in the cold.

== Departures ==
Player	Position	Nationality	Cause
Cade Ahrenholz	Forward	United States	Transferred to Alaska
Brett Chorske	Forward	United States	Transferred to Colgate
Patrick Cozzi	Forward	United States	Graduation (retired)
Matthew Gleason	Forward	United States	Transferred to St. Thomas
Hunter McKown	Forward	United States	Signed professional contract (Columbus Blue Jackets)
Noah Prokop	Forward	United States	Graduate transfer to St. Thomas
Chad Sasaki	Defenseman	United States	Graduation (retired)
Nate Schweitzer	Defenseman	United States	Transferred to Lake Superior State
Matt Vernon	Goaltender	United States	Graduation (signed with Reading Royals)
Bryan Yoon	Defenseman	United States	Graduation (signed with Utah Grizzlies)

== Recruiting ==
Player	Position	Nationality	Age	Notes
Max Burkholder	Defenseman	United States	20	Chaska, MN
Tyler Dunbar	Defenseman	United States	19	Sault Ste. Marie, MI
Antonio Fernandez	Defenseman	United States	19	San Jose, CA
Bret Link	Forward	United States	21	Anchorage, AK
Drew Montgomery	Forward	United States	20	Grand Forks, ND
Riley Stuart	Forward	United States	21	Phoenix, AZ
Klāvs Veinbergs	Forward	Latvia	20	Riga, LAT; selected 224th overall in 2022
Evan Werner	Forward	United States	20	Flower Mound, TX
Henry Wilder	Goaltender	United States	22	Needham, MA; transfer from Boston College
Zaccharya Wisdom	Forward	Canada	19	Toronto, ON; selected 212th overall in 2023

== Roster ==
As of July 24, 2023.

No.	Nat.	Player	Class	Pos	Height	Weight	DoB	Hometown	Previous team	NHL rights
1	(United States)	Jake Begley	Senior	G	6' 1" (1.85 m)	172 lb (78 kg)	1999-03-18	Mahtomedi, Minnesota	Brockville Braves (CCHL)	—
2	(Canada)	Zaccharya Wisdom	Freshman	F	6' 0" (1.83 m)	175 lb (79 kg)	2004-04-21	Toronto, Ontario	Cedar Rapids RoughRiders (USHL)	SEA, 212th overall 2023
4	(United States)	Max Burkholder	Freshman	D	5' 9" (1.75 m)	176 lb (80 kg)	2003-08-08	Chaska, Minnesota	Dubuque Fighting Saints (USHL)	—
5	(United States)	Jack Millar (A)	Senior	D	6' 5" (1.96 m)	220 lb (100 kg)	2000-11-30	Westminster, Colorado	Cedar Rapids RoughRiders (USHL)	—
7	(United States)	Chase Foley	Senior	D	5' 10" (1.78 m)	170 lb (77 kg)	2000-02-17	Mendota Heights, Minnesota	Sioux Falls Stampede (USHL)	—
8	(United States)	Ryan Beck	Sophomore	F	5' 9" (1.75 m)	195 lb (88 kg)	2002-08-25	Linden, Michigan	Dubuque Fighting Saints (USHL)	—
9	(Canada)	Noah Serdachny	Sophomore	F	6' 1" (1.85 m)	190 lb (86 kg)	2003-03-09	Edmonton, Alberta	Salmon Arm Silverbacks (BCHL)	—
10	(United States)	Bret Link	Freshman	F	6' 3" (1.91 m)	188 lb (85 kg)	2002-04-09	Anchorage, Alaska	Fargo Force (USHL)	—
11	(United States)	Ray Christy (A)	Senior	F	5' 11" (1.8 m)	185 lb (84 kg)	1999-09-15	Saint Paul, Minnesota	Sioux City Musketeers (USHL)	—
13	(United States)	Tommy Middleton	Junior	F	5' 11" (1.8 m)	185 lb (84 kg)	2000-06-19	Midland, Michigan	Janesville Jets (NAHL)	—
15	(United States)	Antonio Fernandez	Freshman	D	5' 8" (1.73 m)	178 lb (81 kg)	2003-10-11	San Jose, California	Lincoln Stars (USHL)	—
17	(United States)	Tyler Coffey	Senior	F	5' 10" (1.78 m)	180 lb (82 kg)	2000-05-19	Hamilton, New Jersey	Sioux Falls Stampede (USHL)	—
18	(United States)	Connor Mayer	Graduate	D	5' 11" (1.8 m)	185 lb (84 kg)	1999-06-13	Champlin, Minnesota	Central Illinois Flying Aces (USHL)	—
19	(United States)	Evan Werner	Freshman	F	5' 8" (1.73 m)	173 lb (78 kg)	2003-02-13	Flower Mound, Texas	Tri-City Storm (USHL)	—
20	(United States)	Logan Will (C)	Senior	F	5' 11" (1.8 m)	185 lb (84 kg)	2000-06-14	Ames, Iowa	Omaha Lancers (USHL)	—
21	(United States)	Tyler Dunbar	Freshman	D	6' 1" (1.85 m)	197 lb (89 kg)	2003-12-18	Sault Ste. Marie, Michigan	Lincoln Stars (USHL)	—
22	(United States)	Nikolai Charchenko	Sophomore	D	6' 2" (1.88 m)	210 lb (95 kg)	2001-06-03	Victoria, Minnesota	Minot Minotauros (NAHL)	—
23	(United States)	Ethan Straky	Sophomore	F	5' 11" (1.8 m)	181 lb (82 kg)	2003-04-18	Walnut Creek, California	Green Bay Gamblers (USHL)	—
24	(Latvia)	Klāvs Veinbergs	Freshman	F	6' 3" (1.91 m)	198 lb (90 kg)	2003-03-27	Riga, Latvia	Lincoln Stars (USHL)	TBL, 224th overall 2022
25	(United States)	Riley Stuart	Freshman	F	6' 2" (1.88 m)	201 lb (91 kg)	2002-01-17	Phoenix, Arizona	Dubuque Fighting Saints (USHL)	—
26	(United States)	Noah Laba	Sophomore	F	6' 2" (1.88 m)	192 lb (87 kg)	2003-08-04	Northville, Michigan	Lincoln Stars (USHL)	NYR, 111th overall 2022
27	(Canada)	Stanley Cooley (A)	Junior	F	5' 11" (1.8 m)	188 lb (85 kg)	2002-05-27	Regina, Saskatchewan	Lincoln Stars (USHL)	—
28	(United States)	Gleb Veremyev	Sophomore	F	6' 4" (1.93 m)	206 lb (93 kg)	2003-06-28	Sayreville, New Jersey	Lincoln Stars (USHL)	—
29	(United States)	Drew Montgomery	Freshman	F	5' 11" (1.8 m)	174 lb (79 kg)	2003-03-27	Grand Forks, North Dakota	Omaha Lancers (USHL)	—
31	(United States)	Henry Wilder	Freshman	G	6' 0" (1.83 m)	180 lb (82 kg)	2001-03-19	Needham, Massachusetts	Boston College (HEA)	—
33	(United States)	Kaidan Mbereko	Sophomore	G	5' 11" (1.8 m)	185 lb (84 kg)	2003-07-28	Aspen, Colorado	Lincoln Stars (USHL)	—
37	(United States)	Nicklas Andrews	Senior	D	5' 10" (1.78 m)	193 lb (88 kg)	2001-07-06	Canton, Michigan	Des Moines Buccaneers (USHL)	—
39	(United States)	Danny Weight	Senior	F	6' 0" (1.83 m)	185 lb (84 kg)	2001-05-01	Lattingtown, New York	Boston College (HEA)	—

== Standings ==
2023–24 National Collegiate Hockey Conference Standings
	Conference record										Overall record					
	GP	W	L	T	OTW	OTL	SW	PTS	GF	GA	GP	W	L	T	GF	GA
#8 North Dakota †	24	15	8	1	1	4	0	49	87	67	40	26	12	2	151	105
#1 Denver *	24	15	7	2	3	0	1	45	110	80	44	32	9	3	202	120
#18 St. Cloud State	24	11	9	4	1	3	2	41	77	74	38	17	16	5	121	114
#15 Colorado College	24	14	8	2	5	2	0	41	66	56	37	21	13	3	111	93
#12 Omaha	24	13	8	3	5	0	3	40	68	74	40	23	13	4	117	112
#14 Western Michigan	24	11	13	0	1	5	0	35	78	64	38	21	16	1	136	97
Minnesota Duluth	24	8	14	2	3	3	2	28	65	80	37	12	20	5	103	125
Miami	24	1	21	2	0	2	0	7	44	100	36	7	26	3	78	135
Championship: March 23, 2024 † indicates conference regular season champion (Penrose Cup) * indicates conference tournament champion (Frozen Faceoff Championship Trophy); Rankings: USCHO.com Top 20 Poll; Updated: April 1, 2024

== Schedule and results ==
Date	Time	Opponent^{#}	Rank^{#}	Site	TV	Decision	Result	Attendance	Record
Exhibition
October 7	6:00 pm	Simon Fraser*		Ed Robson Arena • Colorado Springs, Colorado (Exhibition)			W 6–3		
Regular Season
October 13	7:00 pm	Union*		Ed Robson Arena • Colorado Springs, Colorado	SOCO CW	Mbereko	W 7–3	3,607	1–0–0
October 14	6:00 pm	Union*		Ed Robson Arena • Colorado Springs, Colorado		Mbereko	W 6–2	3,611	2–0–0
October 20	7:00 pm	Long Island*		Ed Robson Arena • Colorado Springs, Colorado	SOCO CW	Mbereko	W 3–2	3,412	3–0–0
October 21	6:00 pm	Long Island*		Ed Robson Arena • Colorado Springs, Colorado		Mbereko	W 4–2	3,407	4–0–0
October 27	7:05 pm	at Air Force*		Cadet Ice Arena • Colorado Springs, Colorado (Rivalry)		Mbereko	W 6–2	2,701	5–0–0
October 28	6:00 pm	Augustana*		Ed Robson Arena • Colorado Springs, Colorado	SOCO CW	Mbereko	L 3–4	3,407	5–1–0
November 3	7:00 pm	at #2 Denver		Magness Arena • Denver, Colorado (Rivalry)		Mbereko	L 1–6	7,021	5–2–0 (0–1–0)
November 4	6:00 pm	#2 Denver		Ed Robson Arena • Colorado Springs, Colorado (Rivalry)	SOCO CW	Mbereko	L 1–5	3,749	5–3–0 (0–2–0)
November 10	5:00 pm	at Miami		Steve Cady Arena • Oxford, Ohio		Mbereko	W 5–1	2,107	6–3–0 (1–2–0)
November 11	5:00 pm	at Miami		Steve Cady Arena • Oxford, Ohio		Mbereko	W 4–1	2,431	7–3–0 (2–2–0)
November 17	7:00 pm	#16 Western Michigan		Ed Robson Arena • Colorado Springs, Colorado	SOCO CW	Mbereko	L 1–3	3,407	7–4–0 (2–3–0)
November 18	6:00 pm	#16 Western Michigan		Ed Robson Arena • Colorado Springs, Colorado		Mbereko	L 0–4	3,410	7–5–0 (2–4–0)
December 1	7:00 pm	#12 Arizona State*		Ed Robson Arena • Colorado Springs, Colorado	SOCO CW	Mbereko	T 2–2 ^{OT}	3,519	7–5–1
December 2	6:00 pm	#12 Arizona State*		Ed Robson Arena • Colorado Springs, Colorado		Mbereko	L 0–2	3,463	7–6–1
December 8	6:07 pm	at #1 North Dakota		Ralph Engelstad Arena • Grand Forks, North Dakota	Midco, SOCO CW	Mbereko	W 3–2 ^{OT}	11,569	8–6–1 (3–4–0)
December 9	5:07 pm	at #1 North Dakota		Ralph Engelstad Arena • Grand Forks, North Dakota	Midco	Mbereko	W 3–2 ^{OT}	11,673	9–6–1 (4–4–0)
December 29	7:00 pm	Minot State*	#20	Ed Robson Arena • Colorado Springs, Colorado (Exhibition)		Wilder	W 7–1	3,416	
January 7	4:00 pm	at #10 Minnesota*	#20	3M Arena at Mariucci • Minneapolis, Minnesota	Fox 9+, BTN+	Mbereko	W 6–4	9,490	10–6–1
January 8	6:00 pm	at #12 Minnesota*	#17	3M Arena at Mariucci • Minneapolis, Minnesota	Fox 9+, BTN+	Mbereko	L 2–6	7,369	10–7–1
January 12	6:07 pm	at Minnesota Duluth	#17	AMSOIL Arena • Duluth, Minnesota	SOCO CW	Mbereko	L 2–3 ^{OT}	5,671	10–8–1 (4–5–0)
January 13	6:07 pm	at Minnesota Duluth	#17	AMSOIL Arena • Duluth, Minnesota		Mbereko	W 3–2 ^{OT}	6,246	11–8–1 (5–5–0)
January 19	7:00 pm	Miami	#18	Ed Robson Arena • Colorado Springs, Colorado	SOCO CW, CBSSN	Mbereko	W 2–1	3,474	12–8–1 (6–5–0)
January 20	4:00 pm	Miami	#18	Ed Robson Arena • Colorado Springs, Colorado		Mbereko	W 4–2	3,454	13–8–1 (7–5–0)
January 26	5:00 pm	at #12 Western Michigan	#16	Lawson Arena • Kalamazoo, Michigan		Mbereko	W 2–1 ^{OT}	3,611	14–8–1 (8–5–0)
January 27	4:00 pm	at #12 Western Michigan	#16	Lawson Arena • Kalamazoo, Michigan		Mbereko	W 2–1 ^{OT}	3,710	15–8–1 (9–5–0)
February 2	7:00 pm	#16 St. Cloud State	#14	Ed Robson Arena • Colorado Springs, Colorado	SOCO CW	Mbereko	L 1–2 ^{OT}	3,640	15–9–1 (9–6–0)
February 3	6:00 pm	#16 St. Cloud State	#14	Ed Robson Arena • Colorado Springs, Colorado	SOCO CW	Mbereko	W 5–3	3,687	16–9–1 (10–6–0)
February 16	7:00 pm	#2 North Dakota	#15	Ed Robson Arena • Colorado Springs, Colorado	SOCO CW	Mbereko	W 7–1	3,503	17–9–1 (11–6–0)
February 17	6:00 pm	#2 North Dakota	#15	Ed Robson Arena • Colorado Springs, Colorado		Mbereko	W 6–2	3,585	18–9–1 (12–6–0)
February 23	6:00 pm	at #19 Omaha	#10	Baxter Arena • Omaha, Nebraska		Mbereko	L 0–3	7,802	18–10–1 (12–7–0)
February 24	6:00 pm	at #19 Omaha	#10	Baxter Arena • Omaha, Nebraska		Mbereko	T 1–1 ^{SOL}	7,802	18–10–2 (12–7–1)
March 1	7:00 pm	Minnesota Duluth	#11	Ed Robson Arena • Colorado Springs, Colorado	SOCO CW	Mbereko	T 2–2 ^{SOL}	3,602	18–10–3 (12–7–2)
March 2	6:00 pm	Minnesota Duluth	#11	Ed Robson Arena • Colorado Springs, Colorado	SOCO CW	Mbereko	W 4–1	3,600	19–10–3 (13–7–2)
March 8	7:00 pm	#4 Denver	#10	Ed Robson Arena • Colorado Springs, Colorado (Rivalry)	SOCO CW, CBSSN	Mbereko	W 4–3	3,912	20–10–3 (14–7–2)
March 9	6:00 pm	at #4 Denver	#10	Magness Arena • Denver, Colorado (Rivalry)		Mbereko	L 3–4	7,033	20–11–3 (14–8–2)
NCHC Tournament
March 15	7:07 pm	#12 Omaha*	#10	Ed Robson Arena • Colorado Springs, Colorado (Quarterfinal Game 1)		Mbereko	W 4–3 ^{OT}	3,410	21–11–3
March 16	6:07 pm	#12 Omaha*	#10	Ed Robson Arena • Colorado Springs, Colorado (Quarterfinal Game 2)		Mbereko	L 1–3	3,425	21–12–3
March 17	6:07 pm	#12 Omaha*	#10	Ed Robson Arena • Colorado Springs, Colorado (Quarterfinal Game 3)		Mbereko	L 1–2	3,416	21–13–3
*Non-conference game. ^{#}Rankings from USCHO.com Poll. All times are in Mountain Time. Source:

== Scoring statistics ==
Name	Position	Games	Goals	Assists	Points	PIM
Noah Laba	C	36	20	17	37	27
Gleb Veremyev	C	37	15	13	28	55
Zaccharya Wisdom	RW	33	10	10	20	22
Ryan Beck	C	34	3	17	20	26
Evan Werner	F	37	6	13	19	10
Logan Will	F	37	7	11	18	12
Nicklas Andrews	D	37	3	14	17	29
Chase Foley	D	32	2	14	16	6
Max Burkholder	D	37	7	9	16	6
Bret Link	RW	35	4	11	15	6
Stan Cooley	C	37	5	9	14	14
Jack Millar	D	37	4	8	12	24
Drew Montgomery	F	35	5	5	10	12
Klāvs Veinbergs	C/LW	19	4	6	10	10
Tommy Middleton	F	36	4	4	8	8
Ray Christy	F	36	2	5	7	15
Ethan Straky	D	37	2	3	5	16
Tyler Coffey	F	24	5	0	5	10
Connor Mayer	D	37	0	5	5	24
Riley Stuart	F	19	1	2	3	11
Danny Weight	C	6	1	0	1	0
Tyler Dunbar	D	17	1	0	1	8
Antonio Fernandez	D	2	0	0	0	0
Henry Wilder	G	3	0	0	0	0
Kaidan Mbereko	G	37	0	0	0	0
Noah Serdachny	F	5	0	0	0	2
Total			111	176	287	361

== Goaltending statistics ==
Name	Games	Minutes	Wins	Losses	Ties	Goals against	Saves	Shut outs	SV %	GAA
Kaidan Mbereko	37	2227:17	21	13	3	89	959	0	.915	2.40
Henry Wilder	4	18:30	0	0	0	1	12	0	.923	3.24
Empty Net	-	15:19	-	-	-	3	-	-	-	-
Total	37	2261:06	21	13	3	93	971	0	.913	2.47

== Rankings ==
Poll	Week																										
Poll	Pre	1	2	3	4	5	6	7	8	9	10	11	12	13	14	15	16	17	18	19	20	21	22	23	24	25	26 (Final)
USCHO.com	NR	NR	NR	NR	NR	NR	NR	NR	NR	NR	20	–	20	17	18	16	14	15	15	10	11	10	10	12	15	–	15
USA Hockey	NR	NR	NR	NR	NR	NR	NR	NR	NR	NR	20	20	–	18	18	17	16	15	16	10	14	12	10	13	15	15	15

Note: USCHO did not release a poll in weeks 11 and 25.
Note: USA Hockey did not release a poll in week 12.

== Awards and honors ==
Player	Award	Ref
Kaidan Mbereko	AHCA West First Team All-American	
Noah Laba	AHCA West Second Team All-American	
Kaidan Mbereko	NCHC Goaltender of the Year	
Noah Laba	NCHC Defensive Forward of the Year	
Noah Laba	NCHC Three Stars Award	
Kris Mayotte	Herb Brooks Coach of the Year	
Kaidan Mbereko	NCHC First Team	
Noah Laba	NCHC First Team	

== 2024 NHL entry draft ==
Round	Pick	Player	NHL team
7	208	Fisher Scott ^{†}	Detroit Red Wings

† incoming freshman
