= 2023–24 Miami RedHawks men's ice hockey season =

- Conference: 8th NCHC
- Home ice: Steve Cady Arena

Rankings
- USCHO: NR
- USA Hockey: NR

Record
- Overall: 7–26–3
- Conference: 1–21–2
- Home: 4–11–2
- Road: 3–15–1

Coaches and captains
- Head coach: Chris Bergeron
- Assistant coaches: Barry Schutte; Zack Cisek; Jonathon Elliott; Justin Camuto
- Captain: Jack Clement

The 2023–24 Miami RedHawks men's ice hockey season was the 46th season of play for the program and the 11th in the NCHC. The RedHawks represented Miami University, played their home games at the Steve Cady Arena and were coached by Chris Bergeron in his 5th season.

== Season ==
In the first month of the season, Miami appeared to have resolved whatever problem had been affecting the program over the previous four years. The team went 4–1–1 in October which included a good showing against #13 Arizona State. Logan Neaton was playing well in goal and the many new additions to the lineup were contributing on both sides of the puck. However, as soon as the RedHawks began their conference schedule the results turned sour. Miami followed a strong showing by nearly going winless in November. Neaton's goals against ballooned versus NCHC competition and things got even worse for Miami when freshman Bruno Brūveris got his turn in goal. Compounding the team's problems was the sudden disappearance of their offense as the RedHawks could manage more than two goals in just two of eight games during the second month of play.

The team's defense recovered a bit in December but by Christmas the RedHawks had yet to win a single conference game. At this point the season was already over with the only hope for Miami being able to win their conference tournament, against teams they had already failed to defeat. Despite their situation, the team fought hard after returning from the break and won their first conference match by downing #10 Western Michigan but it came at a high price. With about ten minutes to play in the game, Neaton injured himself while making a save and he would miss the next six weeks while recovering.

Miami now had to rely on Brūveris to carry them down the stretch and the season ended up going from bad to worse. Over an eleven-game span, Brūveris limited the opposition to fewer than three goals just once. With the offense still not providing much support, the team did not win another match for the rest of the season. Even after Neaton's return in early March, the RedHawks remained in a dismal state and went 0–15–1 to end the year.

Shortly after the end of the season, Miami fired head coach Chris Bergeron. In his five years at the helm, the team had not won ten games in any season and had finished last in the conference four times.

== Departures ==
Player	Position	Nationality	Cause
Alec Capstick	Defenseman	Canada	Graduation (retired)
Joe Cassetti	Forward	United States	Transferred to Western Michigan
Nick Donato	Defenseman	United States	Left program (did not play)
Mike Holland	Forward	United States	Transferred to Babson
Alex Murray	Defenseman	United States	Transferred to Niagara
Jack Olmstead	Forward	United States	Graduation (signed with Åmåls SK)
Ludvig Persson	Goaltender	Sweden	Transferred to North Dakota
Chase Pletzke	Forward	United States	Graduate transfer to Michigan
Red Savage	Forward	United States	Transferred to Michigan State
Ryan Savage	Forward	United States	Graduation (retired)
Brian Silver	Forward	United States	Transferred to Augustana
John Sladic	Forward	United States	Graduation (retired)

== Recruiting ==
Player	Position	Nationality	Age	Notes
Tanyon Bajzer	Forward	United States	21	Cleveland, OH
Bruno Brūveris	Goaltender	Latvia	21	Riga, LAT
Spencer Cox	Forward/Defenseman	United States	22	Powell, OH; transfer from Long Island
Teddy Lagerbäck	Forward	United States	22	Chanhassen, MN; transfer from Arizona State
Brayden Morrison	Forward	Canada	21	Calgary, AB; transfer from Wisconsin
Albin Nilsson	Forward	Sweden	25	Ljungby, SWE; graduate transfer from Niagara
Rihards Simanovičs	Defenseman	Latvia	19	Riga, LAT
Ryan Sullivan	Forward	United States	23	Grosse Pointe, MI; transfer from Massachusetts
Artur Turansky	Forward	Slovakia	21	Bratislava, SVK
Raimonds Vītoliņš	Forward	Latvia	21	Ogre, LAT; transfer from Vermont

== Roster ==
As of July 1, 2023

No.	Nat.	Player	Class	Pos	Height	Weight	DoB	Hometown	Previous team	NHL rights
2	(United States)	Spencer Cox	Junior	D	6' 0" (1.83 m)	185 lb (84 kg)	2001-02-07	Dublin, Ohio	LIU (NCAA)	—
3	(Sweden)	Axel Kumlin	Sophomore	D	6' 1" (1.85 m)	195 lb (88 kg)	2002-02-23	Stockholm, Sweden	Dubuque (USHL)	—
4	(United States)	Michael Feenstra	Sophomore	D	6' 3" (1.91 m)	195 lb (88 kg)	2001-04-03	Grand Haven, Michigan	Dubuque (USHL)	—
5	(United States)	Jack Clement (C)	Graduate	D	6' 4" (1.93 m)	200 lb (91 kg)	1999-06-09	Detroit, Michigan	Des Moines (USHL)	—
6	(Latvia)	Raimonds Vītoliņš	Junior	F	6' 0" (1.83 m)	186 lb (84 kg)	2002-01-12	Ogre, Latvia	Green Bay (USHL)	—
7	(United States)	Robby Drazner	Senior	D	6' 1" (1.85 m)	195 lb (88 kg)	2000-02-13	Buffalo Grove, Illinois	Nanaimo (BCHL)	—
8	(United States)	P. J. Fletcher	Senior	F	6' 2" (1.88 m)	185 lb (84 kg)	2001-07-12	Dana Point, California	Dubuque (USHL)	—
9	(Sweden)	Albin Nilsson	Graduate	F	6' 0" (1.83 m)	195 lb (88 kg)	1998-09-18	Ljungby, Sweden	Niagara (AHA)	—
10	(United States)	Zane Demsey	Sophomore	D	6' 2" (1.88 m)	190 lb (86 kg)	2001-11-04	Harrison Township, Michigan	Dubuque (USHL)	—
11	(Sweden)	William Hallén	Sophomore	F	6' 1" (1.85 m)	187 lb (85 kg)	2002-04-15	Gothenburg, Sweden	Dubuque (USHL)	—
13	(United States)	Max Dukovac	Sophomore	F	6' 2" (1.88 m)	182 lb (83 kg)	2002-02-19	Aurora, Illinois	Langley (BCHL)	—
14	(United States)	Thomas Daskas	Senior	F	6' 2" (1.88 m)	200 lb (91 kg)	1999-09-03	Rochester, Michigan	Air Force (AHA)	—
16	(Sweden)	Hampus Rydqvist	Senior	D	5' 10" (1.78 m)	185 lb (84 kg)	1999-03-12	Gothenburg, Sweden	Maryland (NAHL)	—
17	(United States)	John Waldron	Sophomore	F	6' 1" (1.85 m)	185 lb (84 kg)	2002-11-13	Batavia, Illinois	Waterloo (USHL)	—
18	(Canada)	Frankie Carogioiello	Sophomore	F	5' 10" (1.78 m)	173 lb (78 kg)	2002-06-21	Woodbridge, Ontario	Chilliwack (BCHL)	—
19	(Latvia)	Rihards Simanovičs	Freshman	D	6' 3" (1.91 m)	205 lb (93 kg)	2003-10-07	Riga, Latvia	Amarillo (NAHL)	—
22	(United States)	Ryan Sullivan	Senior	F	5' 11" (1.8 m)	190 lb (86 kg)	2000-03-07	Grosse Pointe, Michigan	UMass (HEA)	—
23	(Canada)	Brayden Morrison	Sophomore	F	5' 11" (1.8 m)	175 lb (79 kg)	2002-05-04	Calgary, Alberta	Dubuque (USHL)	—
25	(Slovakia)	Artur Turanský	Sophomore	F	5' 11" (1.8 m)	176 lb (80 kg)	2001-07-12	Bratislava, Slovakia	Lone Star (NAHL)	—
26	(United States)	Blake Mesenburg	Sophomore	F	5' 11" (1.8 m)	183 lb (83 kg)	2002-06-05	Orono, Minnesota	St. Cloud (NAHL)	—
27	(United States)	Dylan Moulton	Senior	D	6' 2" (1.88 m)	199 lb (90 kg)	2001-04-24	Nolensville, Tennessee	Green Bay (USHL)	—
28	(United States)	Tanyon Bajzer	Freshman	F	6' 1" (1.85 m)	180 lb (82 kg)	2002-08-25	Shaker Heights, Ohio	Odessa (NAHL)	—
29	(United States)	Matthew Barbolini	Senior	F	6' 2" (1.88 m)	205 lb (93 kg)	2000-06-01	Williamsville, New York	Lincoln (USHL)	—
30	(Latvia)	Bruno Brūveris	Freshman	G	6' 0" (1.83 m)	170 lb (77 kg)	2002-03-09	Riga, Latvia	Cedar Rapids (USHL)	—
31	(United States)	Logan Neaton	Graduate	G	6' 4" (1.93 m)	200 lb (91 kg)	1999-04-07	Brighton, Michigan	UMass Lowell (HEA)	WPG, 144th overall 2019
33	(United States)	Carter McPhail	Senior	G	5' 11" (1.8 m)	178 lb (81 kg)	1998-12-04	Fenton, Michigan	Ferris State (CCHA)	—
34	(United States)	Teddy Lagerbäck	Sophomore	F	6' 1" (1.85 m)	195 lb (88 kg)	2001-08-21	Minnetonka, Minnesota	Arizona State (NCAA)	—

== Standings ==
2023–24 National Collegiate Hockey Conference Standings
	Conference record										Overall record					
	GP	W	L	T	OTW	OTL	SW	PTS	GF	GA	GP	W	L	T	GF	GA
#8 North Dakota †	24	15	8	1	1	4	0	49	87	67	40	26	12	2	151	105
#1 Denver *	24	15	7	2	3	0	1	45	110	80	42	30	9	3	198	119
#18 St. Cloud State	24	11	9	4	1	3	2	41	77	74	38	17	16	5	121	114
#15 Colorado College	24	14	8	2	5	2	0	41	66	56	37	21	13	3	111	93
#12 Omaha	24	13	8	3	5	0	3	40	68	74	40	23	13	4	117	112
#14 Western Michigan	24	11	13	0	1	5	0	35	78	64	38	21	16	1	136	97
Minnesota Duluth	24	8	14	2	3	3	2	28	65	80	37	12	20	5	103	125
Miami	24	1	21	2	0	2	0	7	44	100	36	7	26	3	78	135
Championship: March 23, 2024 † indicates conference regular season champion (Penrose Cup) * indicates conference tournament champion (Frozen Faceoff Championship Trophy); Rankings: USCHO.com Top 20 Poll; Updated: April 1, 2024

== Schedule and results ==
Date	Time	Opponent^{#}	Rank^{#}	Site	TV	Decision	Result	Attendance	Record
Regular season
October 7	7:07 p.m.	at Ferris State*		Ewigleben Arena • Big Rapids, Michigan	FloHockey	Neaton	L 4–5 ^{OT}	1,678	0–1–0
October 8	5:07 p.m.	at Ferris State*		Ewigleben Arena • Big Rapids, Michigan	FloHockey	Neaton	W 5–2	1,250	1–1–0
October 13	7:05 p.m.	Canisius*		Steve Cady Arena • Oxford, Ohio		Neaton	W 4–2	1,534	2–1–0
October 14	7:05 p.m.	Canisius*		Steve Cady Arena • Oxford, Ohio		Neaton	W 4–1	1,524	3–1–0
October 27	7:05 p.m.	#13 Arizona State*		Steve Cady Arena • Oxford, Ohio		Neaton	W 5–4 ^{OT}	1,818	4–1–0
October 28	7:05 p.m.	#13 Arizona State*		Steve Cady Arena • Oxford, Ohio		Neaton	T 1–1 ^{OT}	1,908	4–1–1
November 3	8:30 p.m.	at St. Cloud State		Herb Brooks National Hockey Center • St. Cloud, Minnesota	Fox 9+	Neaton	L 2–3	3,007	4–2–1 (0–1–0)
November 4	7:00 p.m.	at St. Cloud State		Herb Brooks National Hockey Center • St. Cloud, Minnesota	Fox 9+	Brūveris	L 0–6	3,277	4–3–1 (0–2–0)
November 10	7:05 p.m.	Colorado College		Steve Cady Arena • Oxford, Ohio		Neaton	L 1–5	2,107	4–4–1 (0–3–0)
November 11	7:05 p.m.	Colorado College		Steve Cady Arena • Oxford, Ohio		Neaton	L 1–4	2,431	4–5–1 (0–4–0)
November 17	8:07 p.m.	at #2 North Dakota		Ralph Engelstad Arena • Grand Forks, North Dakota	Midco	Neaton	L 4–6	11,589	4–6–1 (0–5–0)
November 18	7:07 p.m.	at #2 North Dakota		Ralph Engelstad Arena • Grand Forks, North Dakota	Midco	Neaton	L 1–5	11,657	4–7–1 (0–6–0)
November 24	7:05 p.m.	Mercyhurst*		Steve Cady Arena • Oxford, Ohio		Neaton	L 3–4 ^{OT}	1,571	4–8–1
November 25	4:00 p.m.	at Mercyhurst*		Mercyhurst Ice Center • Erie, Pennsylvania	FloHockey	Neaton	W 2–0	630	5–8–1
December 8	7:05 p.m.	Minnesota Duluth		Steve Cady Arena • Oxford, Ohio		Neaton	T 3–3 ^{SOL}	1,889	5–8–2 (0–6–1)
December 9	7:05 p.m.	Minnesota Duluth		Steve Cady Arena • Oxford, Ohio		Neaton	L 1–3	2,092	5–9–2 (0–7–1)
December 29	7:00 p.m.	at Niagara*		Dwyer Arena • Lewiston, New York	FloHockey	Neaton	L 1–4	605	5–10–2
December 30	5:00 p.m.	at Niagara*		Dwyer Arena • Lewiston, New York	FloHockey	Brūveris	W 3–0	733	6–10–2
January 12	7:05 p.m.	#10 Western Michigan		Steve Cady Arena • Oxford, Ohio		Neaton	L 1–4	2,403	6–11–2 (0–8–1)
January 13	7:05 p.m.	#10 Western Michigan		Steve Cady Arena • Oxford, Ohio		Neaton	W 4–3	2,387	7–11–2 (1–8–1)
January 19	9:00 p.m.	at #18 Colorado College		Ed Robson Arena • Colorado Springs, Colorado	SOCO CW, CBSSN	Brūveris	L 1–2	3,474	7–12–2 (1–9–1)
January 20	6:00 p.m.	at #18 Colorado College		Ed Robson Arena • Colorado Springs, Colorado		Brūveris	L 2–4	3,454	7–13–2 (1–10–1)
January 26	8:07 p.m.	at Minnesota Duluth		AMSOIL Arena • Duluth, Minnesota		Brūveris	L 2–6	6,004	7–14–2 (1–11–1)
January 27	8:07 p.m.	at Minnesota Duluth		AMSOIL Arena • Duluth, Minnesota		Brūveris	L 2–3 ^{OT}	6,094	7–15–2 (1–12–1)
February 2	7:05 p.m.	#2 North Dakota		Steve Cady Arena • Oxford, Ohio		Brūveris	L 4–5 ^{OT}	2,717	7–16–2 (1–13–1)
February 3	7:05 p.m.	#2 North Dakota		Steve Cady Arena • Oxford, Ohio		Brūveris	L 1–4	3,101	7–17–2 (1–14–1)
February 9	7:05 p.m.	#16 St. Cloud State		Steve Cady Arena • Oxford, Ohio		Brūveris	L 2–5	2,311	7–18–2 (1–15–1)
February 10	7:05 p.m.	#16 St. Cloud State		Steve Cady Arena • Oxford, Ohio		Brūveris	L 1–3	2,593	7–19–2 (1–16–1)
February 23	9:00 p.m.	at #3 Denver		Magness Arena • Denver, Colorado		Brūveris	T 3–3 ^{SOL}	6,341	7–19–3 (1–16–2)
February 24	8:00 p.m.	at #3 Denver		Magness Arena • Denver, Colorado		Brūveris	L 1–8	6,274	7–20–3 (1–17–2)
March 1	7:05 p.m.	#18 Omaha		Steve Cady Arena • Oxford, Ohio		Brūveris	L 3–4	2,747	7–21–3 (1–18–2)
March 2	7:05 p.m.	#18 Omaha		Steve Cady Arena • Oxford, Ohio		Neaton	L 1–2	2,907	7–22–3 (1–19–2)
March 8	7:00 p.m.	at #15 Western Michigan		Lawson Arena • Kalamazoo, Michigan		Neaton	L 2–3	2,748	7–23–3 (1–20–2)
March 9	7:00 p.m.	at #15 Western Michigan		Lawson Arena • Kalamazoo, Michigan		Brūveris	L 1–6	3,556	7–24–3 (1–21–2)
NCHC tournament
March 15	8:07 p.m.	at #5 North Dakota*		Ralph Engelstad Arena • Grand Forks, North Dakota (Quarterfinal Game 1)	Midco	Neaton	L 1–5	11,320	7–25–3
March 16	7:07 p.m.	at #5 North Dakota*		Ralph Engelstad Arena • Grand Forks, North Dakota (Quarterfinal Game 2)	Midco	Neaton	L 1–7	11,569	7–26–3
*Non-conference game. ^{#}Rankings from USCHO.com Poll. All times are in Eastern Time. Source:

== Scoring statistics ==
Name	Position	Games	Goals	Assists	Points	PIM
Matthew Barbolini	C	31	11	14	25	40
P. J. Fletcher	C/RW	36	11	12	23	18
John Waldron	F	36	9	13	22	6
Raimonds Vītoliņš	C	28	6	11	17	26
Axel Kumlin	D	34	2	9	11	10
William Hallén	C/LW	23	3	7	10	10
Max Dukovac	F	36	3	7	10	10
Ryan Sullivan	F	29	5	4	9	12
Albin Nilsson	C	17	4	5	9	2
Artur Turansky	LW	35	4	5	9	6
Dylan Moulton	D	34	6	2	8	35
Spencer Cox	C/D	30	1	7	8	16
Jack Clement	D	36	1	7	8	10
Hampus Rydqvist	D	36	1	7	8	20
Rihards Simanovičs	D	29	0	8	8	10
Thomas Daskas	F	36	3	4	7	21
Zane Demsey	D	26	1	3	4	25
Michael Feenstra	D	18	0	4	4	2
Robby Drazner	D	33	2	1	3	12
Blake Mesenburg	C	36	2	1	3	16
Frankie Carogioiello	C	4	2	0	2	0
Teddy Lagerbäck	LW	21	1	1	2	12
Tanyon Bajzer	RW	12	0	2	2	0
Brayden Morrison	C	26	0	1	1	6
Carter McPhail	G	2	0	0	0	0
Bruno Brūveris	G	15	0	0	0	0
Logan Neaton	G	23	0	0	0	2
Total			78	135	213	325

== Goaltending statistics ==
Name	Games	Minutes	Wins	Losses	Ties	Goals against	Saves	Shut-outs	SV %	GAA
Logan Neaton	23	1334:48	6	14	2	72	609	1	.894	3.24
Bruno Brūveris	15	794:35	1	12	1	55	355	1	.866	4.15
Carter McPhail	2	38:14	0	0	0	3	23	0	.885	4.71
Empty Net	-	20:47	-	-	-	5	-	-	-	-
Total	36	2188:24	7	26	3	135	987	2	.880	3.70

== Rankings ==
Poll	Week																										
Poll	Pre	1	2	3	4	5	6	7	8	9	10	11	12	13	14	15	16	17	18	19	20	21	22	23	24	25	26 (Final)
USCHO.com	NR	NR	NR	NR	NR	NR	NR	NR	NR	NR	NR	–	NR	NR	NR	NR	NR	NR	NR	NR	NR	NR	NR	NR	NR	–	NR
USA Hockey	NR	NR	NR	NR	NR	NR	NR	NR	NR	NR	NR	NR	–	NR	NR	NR	NR	NR	NR	NR	NR	NR	NR	NR	NR	NR	NR

Note: USCHO did not release a poll in weeks 11 and 25.
Note: USA Hockey did not release a poll in week 12.
