= 2023–24 Minnesota Duluth Bulldogs men's ice hockey season =

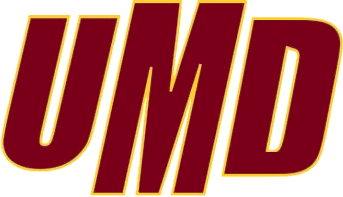
- Conference: 7th NCHC
- Home ice: AMSOIL Arena

Rankings
- USCHO: NR
- USA Hockey: NR

Record
- Overall: 12–20–5
- Conference: 8–14–2
- Home: 8–6–3
- Road: 3–13–2
- Neutral: 1–1–0

Coaches and captains
- Head coach: Scott Sandelin
- Assistant coaches: Adam Krause; Cody Chupp; Brant Nicklin
- Captain: Luke Loheit
- Alternate captain(s): Dominic James; Quinn Olson

The 2023–24 Minnesota Duluth Bulldogs men's ice hockey season was the 80th season of play for the program and 11th in the NCHC. The Bulldogs represented the University of Minnesota Duluth in the 2023–24 NCAA Division I men's ice hockey season, played their home games at AMSOIL Arena and were coached by Scott Sandelin in his 24th season.

== Season ==
In August, junior defenseman Will Francis announced that his cancer had relapsed. Due to treatment, he would miss at least the first half of the season but was hoping to return to the lineup by January. However, he ended up sitting out the entire season. Unfortunately, they wasn't the only bad bit of news for the Bulldogs this year. Just 3 games into the season, Dominic James dislocated his shoulder and tore cartilage in the process. The injury required surgery to fix and he would miss the remainder of the year. And then, in December, the NCAA ruled Cole Spicer academically ineligible for the remainder of the season.

The loss of those three players, all NHL draft picks, hamstrung the Bulldogs from the start of the season. Duluth was able to get off to a decent start, going undefeated in their first 5 games, but everything changed when they travelled to play Cornell. The Big Red were one of the top defensive teams and demonstrated as much by holding UMD to a single goal over the weekend. That began a string of five weeks against ranked teams and the Bulldogs were only able to win one game. Though the goaltending tandem of Zach Stejskal and Matthew Thiessen wasn't quite up to par, the bigger problem for Duluth was the lack of scoring. The offense was run through Ben Steeves, who led the team in scoring for the second straight year, but beyond him the team didn't have much in the way of goal scoring.

After the terrible stretch in the first half, Duluth looked much better in January and was able to get two wins over ranked teams when its offense finally woke up, albeit on an inconsistent basis. At the start of February the team was nearly at .500 and still had a slim chance at an NCAA tournament berth but they were staring down a gauntlet of lethal opponents. The final 10 games for UMD were all against ranked teams and the Bulldogs went winless in the first eight matches. Both the offense and defense weren't up to the challenge and despite Minnesota Duluth sweeping St. Cloud State to end the regular season, the team was dropped to 7th in the conference and had no chance at securing an at-large berth.

Duluth's opponent for the first round of the conference tournament was Denver and the #3 Pioneers took no pity on the Bulldogs. After getting shutout in the first game, Denver had a 3-goal lead in the rematch and looked to be sailing to the semifinals. Goals from Luke Loheit and Kyle Bettens pulled Duluth within one with just over 2 minutes to play. Duluth pulled Thiessen for an extra attacker for their second marker but they were unable to get a third. Instead, Denver scored two empty-net goals and ended Duluth's season.

== Departures ==
| Player | Position | Nationality | Cause |
|---|---|---|---|
| Derek Daschke | Forward | United States | Graduation (signed with Toledo Walleye) |
| Isaac Howard | Forward | United States | Transferred to Michigan State |
| Jesse Jacques | Forward | United States | Graduation (signed with Iowa Heartlanders) |
| Wyatt Kaiser | Defenseman | United States | Signed professional contract (Chicago Blackhawks) |
| Tanner Laderoute | Forward | Canada | Graduation (signed with Wheeling Nailers) |
| Luke Mylymok | Forward | Canada | Transferred to Niagara |

== Recruiting ==
| Player | Position | Nationality | Age | Notes |
|---|---|---|---|---|
| Luke Bast | Defenseman | Canada | 22 | Red Deer, AB; transfer from North Dakota |
| Braden Fischer | Forward | Canada | 20 | Winnipeg, MB |
| Connor McMenamin | Forward | United States | 24 | Collegeville, PA; graduate transfer from Penn State |
| Anthony Menghini | Forward | United States | 20 | Brainerd, MN |
| Matthew Perkins | Forward | Canada | 19 | Balgonie, SK; selected 119th overall in 2023 |
| Aaron Pionk | Defenseman | United States | 20 | Hermantown, MN; selected 149th overall in 2023 |

== Roster ==
As of July 10, 2023.

| No. | Nat. | Player | Class | Pos | Height | Weight | DoB | Hometown | Previous team | NHL rights |
|---|---|---|---|---|---|---|---|---|---|---|
| 2 | (United States) | Darian Gotz | Senior | D | 5' 10" (1.78 m) | 185 lb (84 kg) | 2000-10-19 | Hermantown, Minnesota | Cedar Rapids (USHL) | — |
| 6 | (United States) | Ben Steeves | Sophomore | F | 5' 8" (1.73 m) | 165 lb (75 kg) | 2002-05-10 | Bedford, New Hampshire | Sioux City (USHL) | — |
| 7 | (United States) | Blake Biondi | Senior | F | 6' 1" (1.85 m) | 198 lb (90 kg) | 2002-04-24 | Hermantown, Minnesota | Hermantown (USHS–MN) | MTL, 109th overall 2020 |
| 8 | (United States) | Aaron Pionk | Freshman | D | 6' 0" (1.83 m) | 175 lb (79 kg) | 2003-01-16 | Hermantown, Minnesota | Waterloo (USHL) | MIN, 149th overall 2023 |
| 11 | (United States) | Cole Spicer | Sophomore | F | 5' 10" (1.78 m) | 178 lb (81 kg) | 2004-06-13 | Grand Forks, North Dakota | NTDP (USHL) | BOS, 117th overall 2022 |
| 12 | (United States) | Jack Smith | Sophomore | F | 6' 0" (1.83 m) | 190 lb (86 kg) | 2002-07-06 | St. Cloud, Minnesota | Sioux Falls (USHL) | MTL, 102nd overall 2020 |
| 15 | (Canada) | Quinn Olson (A) | Graduate | F | 6' 0" (1.83 m) | 180 lb (82 kg) | 2001-05-09 | Calgary, Alberta | Okotoks (AJHL) | BOS, 92nd overall 2019 |
| 16 | (United States) | Luke Loheit (C) | Graduate | F | 6' 1" (1.85 m) | 195 lb (88 kg) | 2000-07-26 | Minnetonka, Minnesota | Penticton (BCHL) | OTT, 194th overall 2018 |
| 17 | (United States) | Dominic James (A) | Junior | F | 6' 0" (1.83 m) | 180 lb (82 kg) | 2002-07-03 | Plymouth, Michigan | Lincoln (USHL) | CHI, 173rd overall 2022 |
| 18 | (United States) | Joey Pierce | Sophomore | D | 6' 0" (1.83 m) | 208 lb (94 kg) | 2002-10-02 | Hermantown, Minnesota | Lincoln (USHL) | — |
| 19 | (Canada) | Riley Bodnarchuk | Sophomore | D | 6' 4" (1.93 m) | 205 lb (93 kg) | 2001-06-01 | Okotoks, Alberta | Okotoks (AJHL) | — |
| 20 | (United States) | Owen Gallatin | Junior | D | 5' 8" (1.73 m) | 167 lb (76 kg) | 2002-06-17 | Hugo, Minnesota | Fargo (USHL) | — |
| 21 | (Canada) | Braden Fischer | Freshman | F | 6' 1" (1.85 m) | 185 lb (84 kg) | 2002-10-02 | Winnipeg, Manitoba | Minot (NAHL) | — |
| 22 | (United States) | Kyler Kleven | Junior | F | 5' 11" (1.8 m) | 172 lb (78 kg) | 2000-10-12 | Moorhead, Minnesota | Waterloo (USHL) | — |
| 23 | (United States) | Will Francis | Junior | D | 6' 5" (1.96 m) | 215 lb (98 kg) | 2000-11-16 | Saint Paul, Minnesota | Cedar Rapids (USHL) | ANA, 163rd overall 2019 |
| 24 | (Canada) | Kyle Bettens | Sophomore | F | 6' 3" (1.91 m) | 215 lb (98 kg) | 2001-07-04 | Winnipeg, Manitoba | Youngstown (USHL) | — |
| 26 | (United States) | Anthony Menghini | Freshman | F | 5' 10" (1.78 m) | 184 lb (83 kg) | 2002-12-03 | Baxter, Minnesota | Fargo (USHL) | — |
| 28 | (United States) | Aiden Dubinsky | Sophomore | D | 6' 0" (1.83 m) | 180 lb (82 kg) | 2004-04-28 | Highland Park, Illinois | Tri-City (USHL) | — |
| 31 | (United States) | Zach Sandy | Sophomore | G | 6' 0" (1.83 m) | 175 lb (79 kg) | 2002-12-07 | Fargo, North Dakota | Minot (NAHL) | — |
| 33 | (United States) | Carter Loney | Junior | F | 5' 10" (1.78 m) | 167 lb (76 kg) | 2002-08-02 | Columbus, Ohio | Sioux City (USHL) | — |
| 34 | (Canada) | Matthew Perkins | Freshman | F | 5' 11" (1.8 m) | 156 lb (71 kg) | 2004-01-21 | Balgonie, Saskatchewan | Youngstown (USHL) | VAN, 119th overall 2023 |
| 35 | (United States) | Zach Stejskal | Senior | G | 6' 5" (1.96 m) | 217 lb (98 kg) | 1999-12-20 | Cohasset, Minnesota | Wilkes-Barre/Scranton (NAHL) | — |
| 36 | (Canada) | Matthew Thiessen | Graduate | G | 6' 2" (1.88 m) | 215 lb (98 kg) | 2000-06-09 | Steinbach, Manitoba | Maine (HEA) | VAN, 192nd overall 2018 |
| 37 | (United States) | Luke Johnson | Sophomore | F | 5' 9" (1.75 m) | 165 lb (75 kg) | 2001-10-15 | St. Cloud, Minnesota | Lincoln (USHL) | — |
| 38 | (Canada) | Luke Bast | Junior | D | 5' 10" (1.78 m) | 178 lb (81 kg) | 2000-11-28 | Red Deer, Alberta | North Dakota (NCHC) | — |
| 39 | (United States) | Connor McMenamin | Graduate | F | 5' 11" (1.8 m) | 185 lb (84 kg) | 1999-02-25 | Collegeville, Pennsylvania | Penn State (Big Ten) | — |

== Standings ==
2023–24 National Collegiate Hockey Conference Standings
| | Conference record | | | | | | | | | | Overall record | | | | | |
| | GP | W | L | T | OTW | OTL | SW | PTS | GF | GA | GP | W | L | T | GF | GA |
|---|---|---|---|---|---|---|---|---|---|---|---|---|---|---|---|---|
| #8 North Dakota † | 24 | 15 | 8 | 1 | 1 | 4 | 0 | 49 | 87 | 67 | 40 | 26 | 12 | 2 | 151 | 105 |
| #1 Denver * | 24 | 15 | 7 | 2 | 3 | 0 | 1 | 45 | 110 | 80 | 44 | 32 | 9 | 3 | 202 | 120 |
| #18 St. Cloud State | 24 | 11 | 9 | 4 | 1 | 3 | 2 | 41 | 77 | 74 | 38 | 17 | 16 | 5 | 121 | 114 |
| #15 Colorado College | 24 | 14 | 8 | 2 | 5 | 2 | 0 | 41 | 66 | 56 | 37 | 21 | 13 | 3 | 111 | 93 |
| #12 Omaha | 24 | 13 | 8 | 3 | 5 | 0 | 3 | 40 | 68 | 74 | 40 | 23 | 13 | 4 | 117 | 112 |
| #14 Western Michigan | 24 | 11 | 13 | 0 | 1 | 5 | 0 | 35 | 78 | 64 | 38 | 21 | 16 | 1 | 136 | 97 |
| Minnesota Duluth | 24 | 8 | 14 | 2 | 3 | 3 | 2 | 28 | 65 | 80 | 37 | 12 | 20 | 5 | 103 | 125 |
| Miami | 24 | 1 | 21 | 2 | 0 | 2 | 0 | 7 | 44 | 100 | 36 | 7 | 26 | 3 | 78 | 135 |
Championship: March 23, 2024 † indicates conference regular season champion (Penrose Cup) * indicates conference tournament champion (Frozen Faceoff Championship Trophy); Rankings: USCHO.com Top 20 Poll; Updated: April 1, 2024

== Schedule and results ==
| Date | Time | Opponent^{#} | Rank^{#} | Site | TV | Decision | Result | Attendance | Record |
Regular Season
| October 7 | 7:07 pm | #10 Michigan Tech* | #17 | AMSOIL Arena • Duluth, Minnesota (US Hockey Hall of Fame Game) | | Stejskal | T 2–2 ^{OT} | 6,017 | 0–0–1 |
| October 13 | 7:07 pm | Northern Michigan* | #17 | AMSOIL Arena • Duluth, Minnesota | | Stejskal | T 5–5 ^{OT} | 5,947 | 0–0–2 |
| October 14 | 7:07 pm | Northern Michigan* | #17 | AMSOIL Arena • Duluth, Minnesota | | Thiessen | W 8–5 | 6,497 | 1–0–2 |
| October 20 | 7:07 pm | Bemidji State* | #14 | AMSOIL Arena • Duluth, Minnesota | | Stejskal | W 4–0 | 5,866 | 2–0–2 |
| October 21 | 6:07 pm | at Bemidji State* | #14 | Sanford Center • Bemidji, Minnesota | FloHockey | Stejskal | W 5–4 ^{OT} | 2,451 | 3–0–2 |
| October 27 | 6:00 pm | at #12 Cornell* | #11 | Lynah Rink • Ithaca, New York | ESPN+ | Stejskal | L 1–4 | 4,316 | 3–1–2 |
| October 28 | 6:00 pm | at #12 Cornell* | #11 | Lynah Rink • Ithaca, New York | ESPN+ | Thiessen | L 0–3 | 4,316 | 3–2–2 |
| November 3 | 7:00 pm | at #6 Minnesota* | #14 | 3M Arena at Mariucci • Minneapolis, Minnesota (Rivalry) | Fox 9+, BTN+ | Stejskal | L 1–5 | 10,739 | 3–3–2 |
| November 4 | 7:00 pm | at #6 Minnesota* | #14 | 3M Arena at Mariucci • Minneapolis, Minnesota (Rivalry) | Fox 9+, BTN+ | Thiessen | T 3–3 ^{OT} | 7,345 | 3–3–3 |
| November 10 | 7:07 pm | #4 North Dakota | #18 | AMSOIL Arena • Duluth, Minnesota | | Thiessen | L 2–4 | 6,437 | 3–4–3 (0–1–0) |
| November 11 | 6:07 pm | #4 North Dakota | #18 | AMSOIL Arena • Duluth, Minnesota | | Thiessen | L 0–2 | 6,833 | 3–5–3 (0–2–0) |
| November 17 | 7:30 pm | at #19 St. Cloud State | | Herb Brooks National Hockey Center • St. Cloud, Minnesota | Fox 9+ | Thiessen | L 1–2 | 3,627 | 3–6–3 (0–3–0) |
| November 18 | 6:00 pm | at #19 St. Cloud State | | Herb Brooks National Hockey Center • St. Cloud, Minnesota | Fox 9+ | Thiessen | L 5–6 | 4,211 | 3–7–3 (0–4–0) |
| December 1 | 7:07 pm | #20 Omaha | | AMSOIL Arena • Duluth, Minnesota | | Stejskal | W 4–2 | 5,889 | 4–7–3 (1–4–0) |
| December 2 | 5:07 pm | #20 Omaha | | AMSOIL Arena • Duluth, Minnesota | | Stejskal | L 0–1 ^{OT} | 6,538 | 4–8–3 (1–5–0) |
| December 8 | 6:05 pm | at Miami | | Steve Cady Arena • Oxford, Ohio | | Stejskal | T 3–3 ^{SOW} | 1,889 | 4–8–4 (1–5–1) |
| December 9 | 6:05 pm | at Miami | | Steve Cady Arena • Oxford, Ohio | | Stejskal | W 3–1 | 2,092 | 5–8–4 (2–5–1) |
Holiday Face–Off
| December 28 | 4:00 pm | vs. Northeastern* | | Fiserv Forum • Milwaukee, Wisconsin (Holiday Face–Off Semifinal) | BSW | Stejskal | L 3–4 ^{OT} | 8,652 | 5–9–4 |
| December 29 | 4:00 pm | vs. Air Force* | | Fiserv Forum • Milwaukee, Wisconsin (Holiday Face–Off Consolation Game) | BSW | Stejskal | W 4–1 | 8,689 | 6–9–4 |
| January 6 | 4:07 pm | at St. Thomas* | | St. Thomas Ice Arena • Mendota Heights, Minnesota (Exhibition) | FloHockey | Sandy | L 1–3 | 1,058 | |
| January 12 | 7:07 pm | #17 Colorado College | | AMSOIL Arena • Duluth, Minnesota | SOCO CW | Stejskal | W 3–2 ^{OT} | 5,671 | 7–9–4 (3–5–1) |
| January 13 | 7:07 pm | #17 Colorado College | | AMSOIL Arena • Duluth, Minnesota | | Stejskal | L 2–3 ^{OT} | 6,246 | 7–10–4 (3–6–1) |
| January 19 | 6:00 pm | at #11 Western Michigan | | Lawson Arena • Kalamazoo, Michigan | | Thiessen | W 6–3 | 3,566 | 8–10–4 (4–6–1) |
| January 20 | 5:00 pm | at #11 Western Michigan | | Lawson Arena • Kalamazoo, Michigan | | Thiessen | L 2–5 | 3,648 | 8–11–4 (4–7–1) |
| January 26 | 7:07 pm | Miami | | AMSOIL Arena • Duluth, Minnesota | | Stejskal | W 6–2 | 6,004 | 9–11–4 (5–7–1) |
| January 27 | 7:07 pm | Miami | | AMSOIL Arena • Duluth, Minnesota | | Stejskal | W 3–2 ^{OT} | 6,094 | 10–11–4 (6–7–1) |
| February 2 | 7:07 pm | at #20 Omaha | | Baxter Arena • Omaha, Nebraska | CBSSN | Stejskal | L 1–5 | 7,075 | 10–12–4 (6–8–1) |
| February 3 | 7:07 pm | at #20 Omaha | | Baxter Arena • Omaha, Nebraska | | Thiessen | L 3–4 | 7,802 | 10–13–4 (6–9–1) |
| February 16 | 7:07 pm | #5 Denver | | AMSOIL Arena • Duluth, Minnesota | CBSSN | Stejskal | L 4–5 ^{OT} | 5,598 | 10–14–4 (6–10–1) |
| February 17 | 7:07 pm | #5 Denver | | AMSOIL Arena • Duluth, Minnesota | | Stejskal | L 2–5 | 6,131 | 10–15–4 (6–11–1) |
| February 23 | 7:07 pm | at #4т North Dakota | | Ralph Engelstad Arena • Grand Forks, North Dakota | Midco | Stejskal | L 0–6 | 11,670 | 10–16–4 (6–12–1) |
| February 24 | 6:07 pm | at #4т North Dakota | | Ralph Engelstad Arena • Grand Forks, North Dakota | Midco | Thiessen | L 2–4 | 11,693 | 10–17–4 (6–13–1) |
| March 1 | 8:00 pm | at #11 Colorado College | | Ed Robson Arena • Colorado Springs, Colorado | SOCO CW | Thiessen | T 2–2 ^{SOW} | 3,602 | 10–17–5 (6–13–2) |
| March 2 | 7:00 pm | at #11 Colorado College | | Ed Robson Arena • Colorado Springs, Colorado | SOCO CW | Thiessen | L 1–4 | 3,600 | 10–18–5 (6–14–2) |
| March 8 | 7:07 pm | #17 St. Cloud State | | AMSOIL Arena • Duluth, Minnesota | | Thiessen | W 4–2 | 5,446 | 11–18–5 (7–14–2) |
| March 9 | 6:07 pm | #17 St. Cloud State | | AMSOIL Arena • Duluth, Minnesota | | Sandy | W 6–5 | 5,012 | 12–18–5 (8–14–2) |
NCHC Tournament
| March 15 | 8:07 pm | at #3 Denver* | | Magness Arena • Denver, Colorado (Quarterfinal Game 1) | | Thiessen | L 0–4 | 5,461 | 12–19–5 |
| March 16 | 7:07 pm | at #3 Denver* | | Magness Arena • Denver, Colorado (Quarterfinal Game 2) | | Thiessen | L 2–5 | 6,005 | 12–20–5 |
*Non-conference game. ^{#}Rankings from USCHO.com Poll. All times are in Central Time. Source:

== Scoring statistics ==
| Name | Position | Games | Goals | Assists | Points | PIM |
|---|---|---|---|---|---|---|
| Ben Steeves | LW | 37 | 24 | 10 | 34 | 30 |
| Owen Gallatin | D | 37 | 7 | 23 | 30 | 24 |
| Connor McMenamin | LW | 35 | 6 | 15 | 21 | 10 |
| Quinn Olson | C/LW | 37 | 4 | 17 | 21 | 10 |
| Luke Loheit | RW | 36 | 10 | 10 | 20 | 53 |
| Aaron Pionk | D | 37 | 3 | 17 | 20 | 22 |
| Blake Biondi | C | 34 | 8 | 11 | 19 | 29 |
| Kyle Bettens | C/RW | 36 | 6 | 12 | 18 | 14 |
| Matthew Perkins | C | 35 | 6 | 9 | 15 | 12 |
| Aiden Dubinsky | D | 37 | 3 | 12 | 15 | 20 |
| Jack Smith | C/RW | 34 | 3 | 9 | 12 | 12 |
| Anthony Menghini | F | 37 | 8 | 2 | 10 | 43 |
| Cole Spicer | C | 17 | 5 | 4 | 9 | 8 |
| Luke Bast | D | 37 | 2 | 7 | 9 | 39 |
| Darian Gotz | D | 37 | 0 | 6 | 6 | 37 |
| Carter Loney | C | 33 | 3 | 2 | 5 | 31 |
| Braden Fischer | LW | 22 | 1 | 4 | 5 | 2 |
| Joey Pierce | D | 35 | 0 | 5 | 5 | 12 |
| Riley Bodnarchuk | D | 30 | 2 | 2 | 4 | 6 |
| Kyler Kleven | C | 25 | 1 | 2 | 3 | 13 |
| Luke Johnson | C/LW | 26 | 1 | 2 | 3 | 12 |
| Dominic James | C/LW | 2 | 0 | 1 | 1 | 0 |
| Matthew Thiessen | G | 18 | 0 | 1 | 1 | 0 |
| Zach Sandy | G | 1 | 0 | 0 | 0 | 0 |
| Zach Stejskal | G | 20 | 0 | 0 | 0 | 0 |
| Total | | | 103 | 183 | 286 | 451 |

== Goaltending statistics ==
| Name | Games | Minutes | Wins | Losses | Ties | Goals against | Saves | Shut outs | SV % | GAA |
|---|---|---|---|---|---|---|---|---|---|---|
| Matthew Thiessen | 18 | 1014:03 | 3 | 11 | 2 | 53 | 500 | 0 | .904 | 3.14 |
| Zach Stejskal | 20 | 1161:56 | 8 | 9 | 3 | 58 | 513 | 1 | .898 | 3.00 |
| Zach Sandy | 1 | 64:53 | 1 | 0 | 0 | 5 | 33 | 0 | .868 | 4.62 |
| Empty Net | - | 22:02 | - | - | - | 9 | - | - | - | - |
| Total | 37 | 2262:54 | 12 | 20 | 5 | 125 | 1048 | 1 | .893 | 3.31 |

== Rankings ==
| Poll | Week | | | | | | | | | | | | | | | | | | | | | | | | | | |
| Poll | Pre | 1 | 2 | 3 | 4 | 5 | 6 | 7 | 8 | 9 | 10 | 11 | 12 | 13 | 14 | 15 | 16 | 17 | 18 | 19 | 20 | 21 | 22 | 23 | 24 | 25 | 26 (Final) |
|---|---|---|---|---|---|---|---|---|---|---|---|---|---|---|---|---|---|---|---|---|---|---|---|---|---|---|---|
| USCHO.com | 17 | 17 | 14 | 11 | 14 | 18 | NR | NR | NR | NR | NR | – | NR | NR | NR | NR | NR | NR | NR | NR | NR | NR | NR | NR | NR | – | NR |
| USA Hockey | 17 | 18 | 14 | 12 | 14 | 18 | NR | NR | NR | NR | NR | NR | – | NR | NR | NR | NR | NR | NR | NR | NR | NR | NR | NR | NR | NR | NR |

Note: USCHO did not release a poll in weeks 11 or 25.
Note: USA Hockey did not release a poll in week 12.

== Awards and honors ==
| Player | Award | Ref |
|---|---|---|
| Darian Gotz | NCHC Sportsmanship Award | |
| Ben Steeves | NCHC Second Team | |

== 2024 NHL entry draft ==
| Round | Pick | Player | NHL team |
|---|---|---|---|
| 2 | 42 | Adam Kleber ^{†} | Buffalo Sabres |
| 2 | 47 | Max Plante ^{†} | Detroit Red Wings |

† incoming freshman
