= 2023–24 Western Michigan Broncos men's ice hockey season =

NCAA tournament, Regional Semifinal
- Conference: 6th NCHC
- Home ice: Lawson Arena

Rankings
- USCHO: #14
- USA Hockey: #14

Record
- Overall: 21–16–1
- Conference: 11–13–0
- Home: 11–7–0
- Road: 10–8–1
- Neutral: 0–1–0

Coaches and captains
- Head coach: Pat Ferschweiler
- Assistant coaches: Jason Herter; J. J. Crew; Jared Brown; Will Massey
- Captain: Luke Grainger
- Alternate captain(s): Cédric Fiedler; Chad Hillebrand; Tim Washe

The 2023–24 Western Michigan Broncos men's ice hockey season was the 50th season of play for the program and 11th in the NCHC. The Broncos represented Western Michigan University in the 2023–24 NCAA Division I men's ice hockey season, played their home games at the Lawson Arena and were coached by Pat Ferschweiler in his third season.

== Season ==
Entering the season, Western was facing some upheaval on offense as the team's top three scorers from '23 had departed. Several transfers and freshmen were brought in to plug the holes but if that did not work, the team still had its starting goaltender, Cameron Rowe, to lean on. Fortunately, the new addition fit in well and Western Michigan got off to a good start. The team was able to hold to their mantra of recent years; 'We score four' and averaged nearly 5 goals per game in their opening weeks. The Broncos began the season by going undefeated in their first five games and saw transfers Alex Bump, Sam Colangelo and Matteo Costantini (all NHL-drafted players) begin to mesh with the offense. The team had a bit of a hiccup in early November but then proceeded to reel off seven consecutive victories and put up tremendous scoring figures. Though the Broncos ended the first half with a loss, it was the backend of a split with #4 Denver and did not harm their ranking.

By Christmas, the team was already 7 games above .500 but their position in the polls was not reflective of their stellar record. This was primarily due to their non-conference opposition, which was particularly weak. Of the four non-NCHC teams that the Broncos had faced, all were in the bottom third of the PairWise rankings and two (Ferris State and Lindenwood) were among the three worst teams in the country. Because of this, Western's non-conference wins were downgraded and did not provide them with as much of a boost as they otherwise would have, however, since the Broncos were undefeated outside of league play, it did help stabilize their ranking.

Western needed their non-conference mark as the team ran into trouble once in the second half of the season. Rowe had a few poor outings but the biggest problem was their suddenly inconsistent offense. While Western Michigan never completely lost their scoring touch, they did run through a few stretches where they found it difficult to score. The Broncos were also hindered by the difficulty of their schedule and faced ranked opponents for 10 consecutive games beginning in late January. Western was only able to win 3 of those matches and the team fell to 6th in the conference standings. The team managed a slight recovery by sweeping Miami to close out the regular season but the RedHawks were the worst team in the NCHC.

As the playoffs began, Western sat just inside the cut line for the NCAA tournament. With St. Cloud State as their opponent, the Broncos had three basic scenarios in front of them for the quarterfinal round: 1. Winning the series would all but guarantee the team a spot in the NCAA tournament; 2. Winning one game but losing the series would leave them on the bubble but likely to receive an at-large bid; 3. Being swept would effectively eliminate Western Michigan from the NCAA tournament.

The Broncos did not start their postseason well, surrendering the first three goals of the game to the Huskies. Western did not show any real fight until the third and a pair of goals from Bump in the middle of the period got the team back in the game. However, Chad Hillebrand got a bit over exuberant with the comeback attempt and received a match penalty for hitting from behind. St. Cloud scored twice in the final five minutes to salt away the game and pushed the Broncos season to the brink. Western Michigan played better at the start of game two but still had problems scoring. The Huskies got the opening goal in the second and it was not until the waning moments of the frame that Colangelo was able to tie the score. At the start of the third, WMU had gone 0–3 on the power play but in the final period they were finally able to get their man-advantage working and took the lead. After Luke Grainger scored the second power play marker in the middle of the frame, the team was finally able to relax and play their game. In the final three minutes, Western scored three more goals as St. Cloud desperately tried to tie the score and led to a resounding 6–1 win that, at least temporarily, saves their season.

While a further win would have guaranteed them a place, St. Cloud took the embarrassing loss to heart and repaid the Broncos in kind. WMU was stymied in the rubber match and lost 1–5 thanks to the stellar play from the Huskies goaltender. Despite the setback, loss from other contenders during the week had left Western at 13th in the Pairwise. The only thing that would knock the team out now were upsets in each of the ECAC Hockey, Hockey East and NCHC tournaments. While the ECAC title did get taken by lower team, the others did not and Western was able to earn a bid back to the tournament.

Seeking to prove they belonged in the game, despite their poor performance against good teams throughout the season, Western faced Michigan State in the Midwest Regional semifinal. Despite a poor start, Costantini got his team on the board first and the Broncos began to pick up speed. While the team was unable to build on their lead, they looked far better in the second half than they had at the start. MSU responded with a pair of goals in the second to take the lead but Western's offense replied with three markers in less than four minutes. With a 2-goal lead entering the third, all the Broncos had to do was play a solid defensive game and they'd earn the program its second tournament win. However, Michigan State managed to chip away at the lead and get back to within one when they pulled their goaltender. With less than a minute remaining, the Spartans got the tying goal and forced the match into overtime. Both teams looked a bit hesitant in the extra session but Western was not even able to get a shot on goal through the first 8 minutes. In the end, a rather harmless shot was accidentally deflected by Daniel Hilsendager past Rowe and Western Michigan's season came to a sudden end.

== Departures ==
Player	Position	Nationality	Cause
Barrett Brooks	Forward	United States	Transferred to Mercyhurst
Aidan Fulp	Defenseman	United States	Signed professional contract (New York Islanders)
Cole Gallant	Forward	Canada	Graduation (signed with Trois-Rivières Lions)
William Hambley	Goaltender	Canada	Transferred to Alaska
Lucas Matta	Defenseman	Canada	Transferred to Rensselaer
Ryan McAllister	Forward	Canada	Signed professional contract (Florida Panthers)
Jack Perbix	Forward/Defenseman	United States	Graduate transfer to Northern Michigan
Jason Polin	Forward	United States	Graduation (signed with Colorado Avalanche)
Jamie Rome	Forward	Canada	Graduation (signed with Orlando Solar Bears)
Max Sasson	Forward	United States	Signed professional contract (Vancouver Canucks)
Theo Thrun	Forward	United States	Left program (retired)

== Recruiting ==
Player	Position	Nationality	Age	Notes
Alex Bump	Forward	United States	19	Burnsville, MN; transfer from Vermont; selected 133rd overall in 2022
Joe Cassetti	Forward	United States	24	Pleasanton, CA; graduate transfer from Miami
Sam Colangelo	Forward	United States	21	Stoneham, MA; transfer from Northeastern; selected 36th overall in 2020
Matteo Costantini	Forward	Canada	21	St. Catharines, ON; transfer from North Dakota; selected 131st overall in 2020
Cole Crusberg-Roseen	Defenseman	United States	21	Stratham, NH
Owen Michaels	Forward	United States	21	Detroit, MI
Jacob Napier	Defenseman	United States	20	Lancaster, NY
Ethan Phillips	Forward	Canada	22	Dartmouth, NS; graduate transfer from Boston University; selected 97th overall in 2019
Dawson Smith	Goaltender	Canada	20	Whitehorse, YT
Ean Somoza	Forward	United States	20	Thousand Oaks, CA
Garrett Szydlowski	Forward	United States	21	Detroit, MI

== Roster ==
As of September 1, 2023

No.	Nat.	Player	Class	Pos	Height	Weight	DoB	Hometown	Previous team	NHL rights
1	(United States)	Kirk Laursen	Sophomore (RS)	G	6' 3" (1.91 m)	185 lb (84 kg)	2000-01-02	Bloomfield Hills, Michigan	Miami (NCHC)	—
2	(United States)	Jacob Bauer	Senior	D	6' 3" (1.91 m)	202 lb (92 kg)	2002-02-25	Milford, Michigan	Lincoln Stars (USHL)	—
3	(United States)	Cole Crusberg-Roseen	Freshman	D	5' 11" (1.8 m)	184 lb (83 kg)	2002-04-14	Stratham, New Hampshire	Lincoln Stars (USHL)	—
4	(United States)	Zak Galambos	Graduate	D	6' 2" (1.88 m)	190 lb (86 kg)	1997-05-27	Walnut Creek, California	American International (AHA)	—
6	(United States)	Jacob Napier	Freshman	D	6' 2" (1.88 m)	195 lb (88 kg)	2003-03-31	Lancaster, New York	Fargo Force (USHL)	—
8	(United States)	Joe Cassetti	Graduate	F	6' 4" (1.93 m)	205 lb (93 kg)	1999-02-28	Pleasanton, California	Miami (NCHC)	—
9	(Canada)	Luke Grainger (C)	Senior	F	5' 10" (1.78 m)	180 lb (82 kg)	1999-09-03	Montreal, Quebec	Hawkesbury Hawks (CCHL)	—
10	(United States)	Chad Hillebrand (A)	Senior	F	6' 4" (1.93 m)	200 lb (91 kg)	1999-01-22	Park Ridge, Illinois	Green Bay Gamblers (USHL)	—
11	(United States)	Ethan Wolthers	Sophomore	F	5' 8" (1.73 m)	155 lb (70 kg)	2001-07-19	Valencia, California	Minnesota Wilderness (NAHL)	—
12	(United States)	Sam Colangelo	Senior	F	6' 2" (1.88 m)	210 lb (95 kg)	2001-12-26	Stoneham, Massachusetts	Northeastern (HEA)	ANA, 36th overall 2020
13	(United States)	Oliver MacDonald	Senior	F	5' 10" (1.78 m)	185 lb (84 kg)	2000-11-07	Grosse Pointe, Michigan	Massachusetts (HEA)	—
15	(Canada)	Daniel Hilsendager	Senior	D	6' 1" (1.85 m)	200 lb (91 kg)	2000-03-30	Lloydminster, Saskatchewan	Omaha Lancers (USHL)	—
16	(United States)	Tim Washe (A)	Senior	F	6' 3" (1.91 m)	210 lb (95 kg)	2001-08-25	Detroit, Michigan	Nanaimo Clippers (BCHL)	—
17	(Switzerland)	Cédric Fiedler (A)	Senior	D	6' 3" (1.91 m)	204 lb (93 kg)	2001-04-20	Zug, Switzerland	Fargo Force (USHL)	—
18	(United States)	Wyatt Schingoethe	Junior	F	5' 11" (1.8 m)	180 lb (82 kg)	2002-08-03	Algonquin, Illinois	Waterloo Black Hawks (USHL)	TOR, 195th overall 2020
19	(United States)	Cam Knuble	Senior	F	6' 0" (1.83 m)	200 lb (91 kg)	2000-07-23	Grand Rapids, Michigan	Muskegon Lumberjacks (USHL)	—
20	(United States)	Alex Bump	Freshman	F	6' 0" (1.83 m)	194 lb (88 kg)	2003-11-20	Burnsville, Minnesota	Tri-City Storm (USHL)	PHI, 133rd overall 2022
22	(United States)	Trevor Bishop	Senior	F	6' 0" (1.83 m)	185 lb (84 kg)	1999-01-23	Rochester Hills, Michigan	Victoria Grizzlies (BCHL)	—
23	(Canada)	Carter Berger	Graduate	D	6' 0" (1.83 m)	185 lb (84 kg)	1999-09-17	North Vancouver, British Columbia	Connecticut (HEA)	FLA, 106th overall 2019
24	(United States)	Garrett Szydlowski	Freshman	F	5' 10" (1.78 m)	185 lb (84 kg)	2002-06-12	Detroit, Michigan	Wenatchee Wild (BCHL)	—
25	(Canada)	Matteo Costantini	Junior	F	6' 0" (1.83 m)	192 lb (87 kg)	2002-08-16	St. Catharines, Ontario	North Dakota (NCHC)	BUF, 131st overall 2020
26	(United States)	Ean Somoza	Freshman	F	6' 3" (1.91 m)	188 lb (85 kg)	2003-02-08	Thousand Oaks, California	Wenatchee Wild (BCHL)	—
27	(Canada)	Cole Burtch	Sophomore	F	5' 10" (1.78 m)	170 lb (77 kg)	2001-01-11	Markham, Ontario	Cedar Rapids RoughRiders (USHL)	—
28	(United States)	Hugh Larkin	Senior	F	6' 2" (1.88 m)	205 lb (93 kg)	1999-03-27	Livonia, Michigan	Austin Bruins (NAHL)	—
29	(Canada)	Ethan Phillips	Graduate	F	5' 10" (1.78 m)	160 lb (73 kg)	2001-05-07	Dartmouth, Nova Scotia	Boston University (HEA)	DET, 97th overall 2019
30	(Canada)	Dawson Smith	Freshman	G	6' 4" (1.93 m)	195 lb (88 kg)	2003-02-17	Whitehorse, Yukon	La Ronge Ice Wolves (SJHL)	—
31	(United States)	Cameron Rowe	Senior	G	6' 3" (1.91 m)	210 lb (95 kg)	2001-06-01	Wilmette, Illinois	Wisconsin (Big Ten)	—
33	(Sweden)	Samuel Sjölund	Sophomore	D	6' 1" (1.85 m)	175 lb (79 kg)	2001-05-19	Stockholm, Sweden	Dubuque Fighting Saints (USHL)	DAL, 111th overall 2019
34	(United States)	Owen Michaels	Freshman	F	6' 0" (1.83 m)	185 lb (84 kg)	2002-05-01	Detroit, Michigan	Dubuque Fighting Saints (USHL)	—
37	(United States)	Dylan Wendt	Junior	F	6' 1" (1.85 m)	185 lb (84 kg)	2001-01-09	Grand Haven, Michigan	Muskegon Lumberjacks (USHL)	—

== Standings ==
2023–24 National Collegiate Hockey Conference Standings
	Conference record										Overall record					
	GP	W	L	T	OTW	OTL	SW	PTS	GF	GA	GP	W	L	T	GF	GA
#8 North Dakota †	24	15	8	1	1	4	0	49	87	67	40	26	12	2	151	105
#1 Denver *	24	15	7	2	3	0	1	45	110	80	42	30	9	3	198	119
#18 St. Cloud State	24	11	9	4	1	3	2	41	77	74	38	17	16	5	121	114
#15 Colorado College	24	14	8	2	5	2	0	41	66	56	37	21	13	3	111	93
#12 Omaha	24	13	8	3	5	0	3	40	68	74	40	23	13	4	117	112
#14 Western Michigan	24	11	13	0	1	5	0	35	78	64	38	21	16	1	136	97
Minnesota Duluth	24	8	14	2	3	3	2	28	65	80	37	12	20	5	103	125
Miami	24	1	21	2	0	2	0	7	44	100	36	7	26	3	78	135
Championship: March 23, 2024 † indicates conference regular season champion (Penrose Cup) * indicates conference tournament champion (Frozen Faceoff Championship Trophy); Rankings: USCHO.com Top 20 Poll; Updated: April 1, 2024

== Schedule and results ==
Date	Time	Opponent^{#}	Rank^{#}	Site	TV	Decision	Result	Attendance	Record
Exhibition
October 7	7:00 p.m.	at USNTDP*	#12	USA Hockey Arena • Plymouth, Michigan (Exhibition)			W 9–4		
Regular season
October 12	7:00 p.m.	Ferris State*	#12	Lawson Arena • Kalamazoo, Michigan		Rowe	W 6–4	3,640	1–0–0
October 13	7:07 p.m.	at Ferris State*	#12	Ewigleben Arena • Big Rapids, Michigan	FloHockey	Rowe	T 3–3 ^{OT}	1,675	1–0–1
October 20	7:07 p.m.	at Bowling Green*	#9	Slater Family Ice Arena • Bowling Green, Ohio	FloHockey	Rowe	W 5–2	4,862	2–0–1
October 21	6:00 p.m.	Bowling Green*	#9	Lawson Arena • Kalamazoo, Michigan		Rowe	W 5–2	2,760	3–0–1
November 3	8:07 p.m.	at Omaha	#11	Baxter Arena • Omaha, Nebraska		Rowe	W 5–2	5,393	4–0–1 (1–0–0)
November 4	8:07 p.m.	at Omaha	#11	Baxter Arena • Omaha, Nebraska		Rowe	L 2–3 ^{OT}	6,225	4–1–1 (1–1–0)
November 10	7:00 p.m.	St. Cloud State	#12	Lawson Arena • Kalamazoo, Michigan		Rowe	L 2–3	3,943	4–2–1 (1–2–0)
November 11	6:00 p.m.	St. Cloud State	#12	Lawson Arena • Kalamazoo, Michigan		Rowe	L 0–3	3,767	4–3–1 (1–3–0)
November 17	9:00 p.m.	at Colorado College	#16	Ed Robson Arena • Colorado Springs, Colorado	SOCO CW	Rowe	W 3–1	3,407	5–3–1 (2–3–0)
November 18	8:00 p.m.	at Colorado College	#16	Ed Robson Arena • Colorado Springs, Colorado		Rowe	W 4–0	3,410	6–3–1 (3–3–0)
November 24	7:00 p.m.	St. Lawrence*	#15	Lawson Arena • Kalamazoo, Michigan		Rowe	W 5–1	2,340	7–3–1
November 25	6:00 p.m.	St. Lawrence*	#15	Lawson Arena • Kalamazoo, Michigan		Rowe	W 4–0	2,245	8–3–1
December 1	7:00 p.m.	Lindenwood*	#14	Lawson Arena • Kalamazoo, Michigan		Rowe	W 3–1	2,733	9–3–1
December 2	6:00 p.m.	Lindenwood*	#14	Lawson Arena • Kalamazoo, Michigan		Rowe	W 5–1	2,982	10–3–1
December 8	7:00 p.m.	#4 Denver	#13	Lawson Arena • Kalamazoo, Michigan		Rowe	W 7–3	3,558	11–3–1 (4–3–0)
December 9	6:00 p.m.	#4 Denver	#13	Lawson Arena • Kalamazoo, Michigan		Rowe	L 5–6 ^{OT}	3,791	11–4–1 (4–4–0)
December 30	6:00 p.m.	Western Ontario*	#12	Lawson Arena • Kalamazoo, Michigan (Exhibition)		Laursen	W 6–2		
January 5	8:10 p.m.	at Lindenwood*	#11	Centene Community Ice Center • St. Charles, Missouri		Rowe	W 3–2	1,261	12–4–1
January 6	3:10 p.m.	at Lindenwood*	#11	Centene Community Ice Center • St. Charles, Missouri		Rowe	W 6–1	907	13–4–1
January 12	7:00 p.m.	at Miami	#10	Steve Cady Arena • Oxford, Ohio		Rowe	W 4–1	2,403	14–4–1 (5–4–0)
January 13	7:00 p.m.	at Miami	#10	Steve Cady Arena • Oxford, Ohio		Rowe	L 3–4	2,387	14–5–1 (5–5–0)
January 19	7:00 p.m.	Minnesota Duluth	#11	Lawson Arena • Kalamazoo, Michigan		Rowe	L 3–6	3,566	14–6–1 (5–6–0)
January 20	6:00 p.m.	Minnesota Duluth	#11	Lawson Arena • Kalamazoo, Michigan		Rowe	W 5–2	3,648	15–6–1 (6–6–0)
January 26	7:00 p.m.	#16 Colorado College	#12	Lawson Arena • Kalamazoo, Michigan		Rowe	L 1–2 ^{OT}	3,611	15–7–1 (6–7–0)
January 27	6:00 p.m.	#16 Colorado College	#12	Lawson Arena • Kalamazoo, Michigan		Rowe	L 1–2 ^{OT}	3,710	15–8–1 (6–8–0)
February 2	9:00 p.m.	at #5 Denver	#15	Magness Arena • Denver, Colorado		Rowe	L 2–3	6,467	15–9–1 (6–9–0)
February 3	8:00 p.m.	at #5 Denver	#15	Magness Arena • Denver, Colorado		Rowe	W 7–2	6,202	16–9–1 (7–9–0)
February 9	7:00 p.m.	#19 Omaha	#14	Lawson Arena • Kalamazoo, Michigan		Rowe	W 6–1	3,311	17–9–1 (8–9–0)
February 10	6:00 p.m.	#19 Omaha	#14	Lawson Arena • Kalamazoo, Michigan		Rowe	L 2–3 ^{OT}	3,614	17–10–1 (8–10–0)
February 23	8:30 p.m.	at #15 St. Cloud State	#13	Herb Brooks National Hockey Center • St. Cloud, Minnesota	Fox 9+	Rowe	W 4–3	3,502	18–10–1 (9–10–0)
February 24	7:00 p.m.	at #15 St. Cloud State	#13	Herb Brooks National Hockey Center • St. Cloud, Minnesota	Fox 9+	Rowe	L 0–3	4,116	18–11–1 (9–11–0)
March 1	8:07 p.m.	at #3 North Dakota	#12	Ralph Engelstad Arena • Grand Forks, North Dakota	Midco, CBSSN	Rowe	L 3–5	11,833	18–12–1 (9–12–0)
March 2	7:07 p.m.	at #3 North Dakota	#12	Ralph Engelstad Arena • Grand Forks, North Dakota	Midco 2	Rowe	L 0–3	11,776	18–13–1 (9–13–0)
March 8	7:00 p.m.	Miami	#15	Lawson Arena • Kalamazoo, Michigan		Rowe	W 3–2	2,748	19–13–1 (10–13–0)
March 9	6:00 p.m.	Miami	#15	Lawson Arena • Kalamazoo, Michigan		Rowe	W 6–1	3,556	20–13–1 (11–13–0)
NCHC tournament
March 15	8:37 p.m.	at #18 St. Cloud State*	#14	Herb Brooks National Hockey Center • St. Cloud, Minnesota (Quarterfinal Game 1)	Fox 9+	Rowe	L 2–5	3,026	20–14–1
March 16	7:07 p.m.	at #18 St. Cloud State*	#14	Herb Brooks National Hockey Center • St. Cloud, Minnesota (Quarterfinal Game 2)	Fox 9+	Rowe	W 6–1	2,495	21–14–1
March 17	7:07 p.m.	at #18 St. Cloud State*	#14	Herb Brooks National Hockey Center • St. Cloud, Minnesota (Quarterfinal Game 3)	Fox 9+	Rowe	L 1–5	—	21–15–1
NCAA tournament
March 29	5:00 p.m.	vs. #4 Michigan State*	#14	Centene Community Ice Center • Maryland Heights, Missouri (Midwest Regional Semifinal)	ESPNU	Rowe	L 4–5 ^{OT}	3,148	21–16–1
*Non-conference game. ^{#}Rankings from USCHO.com Poll. All times are in Eastern Time. Source:

== NCAA tournament ==
=== Regional semifinal ===
March 29, 2024; 4:00 p.m.	(1) Michigan State	5–4 (OT) (0–1, 2–3, 2–0, 1–0)	(4) Western Michigan	Centene Community Ice Center; Attendance: 3,148

Game reference

Trey Augustine
Goalies
Cameron Rowe
Referees:
Joseph Carusone
C. J. Hanafin
Linesmen:
Ryann Knapp
Patrick Dapuzzo

	0–1	7:29 – Matteo Costantini (11) (Hilsendager, Wendt)
(Geary, Basgall) Daniel Russell (9) – 25:05	1–1
(Dorwart) David Gucciardi (9) – 30:25	2–1
	2–2	32:51 – PP – Alex Bump (14) (Grainger, Sjolund)
	2–3	34:42 – Sam Colangelo (24) (Bump)
	2–4	36:11 – Zak Galambos (9) (Michaels, Fiedler)
(Shoudy, Kelly) Nash Nienhuis (9) – 48:15	3–4
(Levshunov, Howard) Karsen Dorwart (15) – EA – 59:05	4–4
(Nienhuis, Augustine) Jeremy Davidson (12) – GW – 68:47	5–4

2 min
Penalties
2 min
32
Shots
38

Game summary
Michigan State got on its horses straight away and put pressure on the WMU cage. Cameron Rowe had to stop the first six shots of the game and the Broncos did not get the puck on Trey Augustine until the 5-minute mark. MSU dominated play through the first seven minutes but when Western finally got set up in the offensive zone, Matteo Costantini was able to use a screen by several players to beat Augustine from the top of the right circle for the first goal. The Broncos started getting the puck down low, behind the Michigan State goal line, and tried to win the puck with a combination of speed and board battles. The Spartans counterattacked with a solid backcheck and generated several chances off of the rush. The play between the two teams was fairly even for several minutes with both squads getting scoring chances though neither was able to sustain a continual attack. Both teams played physically throughout the period but Western seemed to get the better of the exchange.

Western Michigan got off to a quick start in the second and attacked the MSU net. Augustine and the defense were able to turn them away and allow the Spartan offense to take their turn in the offensive zone. At about the 3-minute mark, Wyatt Schingoethe got the puck at the top of the blue paint from a cross-crease pass but Augustine managed to slide over and make the save on the one-timer. Two minutes later, a stretch pass from Matt Basgall found Daniel Russell at center ice and gave the Spartan forward a 100-foot break-away. Just as he got to the slot, Russell fired the puck through Rowe's six-hole to tie the game. The pace picked up afterwards and both gets got back to their speed game. After a few minutes, a shot from Daniel Hilsendager was stopped by Augustine but the puck squeaked through his arms and fell to the ice in the crease. Fortunately for Michigan State, a Spartan defender was first on the scene and he helped his goaltender freeze the puck for a faceoff. Coming out of the mid-period TV timeout, MSU won the offensive zone faceoff and David Gucciardi blasted the puck past Rowe from the blue line. Western went on the attack following the goal but MSU was able to clear the puck after a couple of chances. As the Broncos continued to press, Gavin O'Connell was called for a hooking penalty and give Western the first power play of the night. WMU won the faceoff and moved the puck around the Michigan State zone until it came to Alex Bump to the left of the goal He tried to pass the puck across the net but it deflected off of a defender's skate into the net. After tying the game, Western continued to pressure the Spartans and after a bouncing puck eluded an MSU player at center ice, Bump found a streaking Sam Colangelo who wired the puck into the goal past Augustine's Blocker. Michigan State tried to match the Broncos' effort but instead they could only watch as Zak Galambos scored a marker that was a mirror-image of the earlier Gucciardi goal, again, to Augustine's blocker-side. With the game starting to get away from them, MSU attacked the Western end vigorously and forced Galambos into a hooking penalty. Western challenged the play for a dive by Russell but the officials did not see enough evidence for a matching minor. Western was able to kill off the rest of the period but still left them with a minute more on the PK to start the third.

MSU was unable to get much going once play resumed and squandered their man-advantage. Western continued to carry the play and Luke Grainger nearly scored when his chip-shot from the low slot clanked off of the post and stayed out. Michigan State tried to get something going to cut into the Broncos' lead but every time they touched the puck a Western player was there to force the issue. Tim Washe was very conspicuous with several hard hits in the third but the Spartans refused to quit. Near the middle of the period, a turnover by Western at the own blue line allowed Michigan State to finally establish some zone time and eventually Nash Nienhuis was able to fire the puck past a screened Cameron Rowe to cut the lead to 1. WMU got right back to its high-pressure game after the goal and tried to regain their 2-goal lead but the Spartans had regained their footing and the two teams started exchanging scoring chances. With about six minutes to play, Bump got on a partial break from center ice but Augustine stood tall and made the save. After the play, an earlier hit by Washe was reviewed for a major penalty (contact to the head) but the officials decided against leveling an infraction. Once play resumed, the two goaltender both committed turnovers after handling the puck that led to scoring opportunities but neither surrendered a goal. With under three minutes to play, a second goal got behind Augustine after a save but MSU managed to clear the puck away. Moments later, after Augustine was pulled for an extra attacker, Rowe made a save but could not freeze the puck. The loose biscuit dribbled just to the side before being cleared by Western. Michigan State managed to prevent an attempt on their open goal and then raced up the ice. With less than a minute left, Artyom Levshunov skated the puck up the right side of the ice and, as he was approaching the goal line, he found Karsen Dorwart alone in front of the goal for the tying marker. The final 55 seconds passed to no effect and overtime was needed to settle the game.

The play settled down once overtime began with both teams playing a bit more hesitantly on their forechecking. The result was that though each team could now get into the offensive zone, much of the play was restricted to the perimeter. However, as play wore on, Michigan State began to turn zone time into scoring opportunities and Rowe was forced to stop several good chances. Western, conversely, was unable to get anything going offensively and did not get a single shot on goal through eight minutes of play. Near the middle of the period, a Jeremy Davidson took a seemingly harmless shot on goal from the half wall but it deflected off of Hilsendager's stick past Rowe for the winning goal.

== Scoring statistics ==
Name	Position	Games	Goals	Assists	Points	PIM
Luke Grainger	F	38	14	34	48	21
Dylan Wendt	RW	38	23	21	44	10
Sam Colangelo	C/RW	38	24	19	43	23
Alex Bump	LW	38	14	22	36	27
Matteo Costantini	C	38	11	20	31	18
Chad Hillebrand	C/LW	38	7	19	26	44
Ethan Phillips	C/RW	29	9	14	23	12
Zak Galambos	D	38	9	12	21	39
Carter Berger	D	36	4	16	20	14
Samuel Sjolund	D	38	3	15	18	10
Joe Cassetti	LW	38	8	9	17	8
Tim Washe	C	38	2	10	12	27
Hugh Larkin	RW	37	5	4	9	34
Daniel Hilsendager	D	33	1	7	8	19
Cédric Fiedler	D	38	0	8	8	23
Owen Michaels	F	38	2	5	7	10
Wyatt Schingoethe	C	24	0	4	4	2
Jacob Bauer	D	27	0	4	4	8
Cole Crusberg-Roseen	D	22	0	3	3	10
Cole Burtch	LW	3	0	1	1	4
Jacob Napier	D	6	0	1	1	2
Cam Knuble	F	28	0	1	1	4
Trevor Bishop	F	10	0	0	0	0
Ean Somoza	F	10	0	0	0	12
Cameron Rowe	G	38	0	0	0	0
Total			136	249	385	393

== Goaltending statistics ==
Name	Games	Minutes	Wins	Losses	Ties	Goals against	Saves	Shut-outs	SV %	GAA
Cameron Rowe	38	2286:10	21	16	1	94	872	3	.903	2.47
Empty Net	-	20:41	-	-	-	3	-	-	-	-
Total	38	2306:51	21	16	1	97	872	2	.900	2.52

== Rankings ==
Poll	Week																										
Poll	Pre	1	2	3	4	5	6	7	8	9	10	11	12	13	14	15	16	17	18	19	20	21	22	23	24	25	26 (Final)
USCHO.com	12	12	9	10	11	12	16	15	14	13	12	–	11	10	11	12	15	14	13	13	12	15	14	15	14	–	14
USA Hockey	10	12	10	10	11	12	16	15	15	13	12	12	–	10	11	12	14	14	13	12	11	14	12	15	13	14	14

Note: USCHO did not release a poll in weeks 11 or 25.
Note: USA Hockey did not release a poll in week 12.

== Awards and honors ==
Player	Award	Ref
Luke Grainger	NCHC Scholar-Athlete of the Year	
Luke Grainger	NCHC Second Team	
Alex Bump	NCHC Rookie Team	

== 2024 NHL entry draft ==
Round	Pick	Player	NHL team
6	175	Joona Väisänen ^{†}	Pittsburgh Penguins

† incoming freshman
