= 2023–24 Omaha Mavericks men's ice hockey season =

NCAA Tournament, Regional Semifinal
- Conference: 5th NCHC
- Home ice: Baxter Arena

Rankings
- USCHO: #12
- USA Hockey: #13

Record
- Overall: 23–13–4
- Conference: 13–8–3
- Home: 11–5–3
- Road: 11–6–1
- Neutral: 1–2–0

Coaches and captains
- Head coach: Mike Gabinet
- Assistant coaches: Dave Noël-Bernier; Peter Aubry; Bennett Hambrook
- Captain: Nolan Sullivan
- Alternate captain(s): Matt Miller; Jack Randl

The 2023–24 Omaha Mavericks men's ice hockey season was the 27th season of play for the program and 11th in the NCHC. The Mavericks represented the University of Nebraska Omaha, played their home games at Baxter Arena and were coached by Mike Gabinet in his 7th season.

== Season ==
Omaha added a good deal of experience in the offseason. While only losing a handful of players, the Mavericks brought in five transfers (three of them graduates) to bolster the lineup. Šimon Latkoczy was expected to act as the primary starter, however, Seth Eisele was added to give the team a second option in goal.

Omaha had a little trouble getting on track in the first half of the season and, while they performed well at times, several of their opponents weren't particularly good. The team's defense was performing well, however, the offense was a bit up-and-down. Omaha did not have a particular leader up front but rather scored by committee. The balanced attack allowed the team to a consistent threat no matter which line was on the ice, however, it also prevented the team from distancing themselves in many games. In the first half, seven of the team's nine wins were by 1 goal while all of their losses were by multiple scores. This peculiarity also had the secondary effect of lowering the Mavericks' ranking as the PairWise takes into account the margin of victory as one of its parameters. As a result, despite being well above .500 by the winter break, Omaha was only in the mid-20s and needed to climb over 10 teams to have a shot at an at-large bid.

The game against Denver on November 18 was halted after the first period due to poor ice conditions. A patch of ice behind the Denver net didn't freeze properly and after attempting to address the problem for over an hour, the game was postponed until the following day. Because an entire period had already been played, the game resumed at the start of the second.

Upon their return, the Mavericks ran through a gauntlet of ranked teams, playing five consecutive matches against very difficult competition. Latkoczy did not perform well in several of those games and the Mavericks lost four to drop towards the bottom of the conference standings. With the team's chances dwindling, Omaha entered the final week of January needing a spark. The first match with St. Cloud State proved to be a turning point in the team's season as the offense came to the rescue. Latkoczy had his third consecutive poor outing, allowing 6 goals, but UNO did not surrender and kept fighting. The offense banded together and refused to allow St. Cloud to pull away, answering goal for goal in the second period and then briefly took a lead in the third. Tanner Ludtke's power play goal in overtime won the match and began a streak of winning hockey for the Mavs. Omaha lost just once more until the end of the regular season which was in no small part to Latkoczy getting back on track and acting like a starting goaltender once more. The team's late surge got them into the top-20 and their sweep of #3 North Dakota in the finale put them into contention for the NCAA tournament.

As the playoffs began, Omaha sat in 11th place, which would have gotten them in the tournament if the season ended then. They received a bit of good fortune with their opponent in the first round, Colorado College. The Tigers were another team vying for a spot in the tournament and the quarterfinal series between the two could serve as a de facto elimination game. Whichever team won the series would be all but guaranteed a spot in the NCAA tournament and both played like it. Omaha got off to a good start and had a 3-goal lead just past the midway point of the game. However, the team got into penalty trouble in the second half and allowed CC to claw their way back. By the start of overtime, the Tigers were in total control of the game and Omaha could hardly get a shot on goal. Latkoczy played well to keep his team alive but 50 shot of the night from Colorado College found the back of the net and gave the home team a lead in the series.

The second game saw a similar pattern with CC peppering the Omaha goal with shots. This time, however, it was the Maverick power play that proved to be the difference. Two goals on the man-advantage led Omaha to the win and set up a showdown in game three. Colorado College got a lead in the first but Latkoczy shut the door afterwards and allowed Brock Bremer to become the hero with his game-winner in the third period. The series win didn't change Omaha's place in the standings but did cement them as a tournament team. No matter what happened in the final week of the season, the Mavericks were guaranteed a spot in the tournament but they could improve their chances if they played well in Saint Paul.

The semifinal game turned into the Zach Urdahl show and the junior scored his first career hat-trick to lead Omaha to a win over North Dakota. The following night, Omaha got an early lead over Denver but the nation's top offense proved too much for the Mavericks to handle and Pioneers scored the next four goals to win the title.

Omaha had little time to lick their wounds as they were headed for a showdown against Minnesota in the NCAA tournament. Both team started slow and combined for only 13 shots on goal in the first period. After a sleepy 20 minutes, the two teams then went fully on the attack and nearly tripled the shot total in the middle frame. Omaha got on the board first with a Joaquim Lemay power play goal. The Mavs were nearly able to carry the lead into the third but the withering barrage finally dented the twice behind Latkoczy near the end of the period. UNO redoubled its efforts and got their lead back in less than five minutes thanks to Ty Mueller. However, Minnesota would not stay down and the Gophers scored twice more to take the lead and the game.

== Departures ==
Player	Position	Nationality	Cause
Cameron Berg	Forward	United States	Transferred to North Dakota
Kaden Bohlsen	Forward	United States	Transferred to Minnesota State
Jake Kucharski	Goaltender	United States	Graduation (signed with Chicago Wolves)
Davis Pennington	Defenseman	United States	Transferred to Quinnipiac
Jake Pivonka	Forward	United States	Graduation (signed with Bridgeport Islanders)
Jonny Tychonick	Defenseman	Canada	Graduation (signed with Newfoundland Growlers)
Tyler Weiss	Forward	United States	Graduation (signed with Toronto Marlies)
Jacob Zab	Goaltender	United States	Graduation (retired)

== Recruiting ==
Player	Position	Nationality	Age	Notes
Will Craig	Goaltender	Canada	21	Ennismore, ON
Seth Eisele	Goaltender	United States	24	Lake Elmo, MN; graduate transfer from Lake Superior State
Noah Ellis	Defenseman	United States	21	Urbandale, IA; transfer from Massachusetts; selected 184th overall in 2020
Jesse Lansdell	Forward	Canada	25	Surrey, BC; graduate transfer from Notre Dame
Tanner Ludtke	Forward	United States	18	Elko, MN; selected 81st overall in 2023
Charlie Lurie	Forward	United States	20	Minnetonka, MN
Zach Urdahl	Forward	United States	21	Eau Claire, WI; transfer from Wisconsin
Dom Vidoli	Defenseman	United States	24	Strongsville, OH; graduate transfer from Ohio State

== Roster ==
As of August 2, 2023.

No.	Nat.	Player	Class	Pos	Height	Weight	DoB	Hometown	Previous team	NHL rights
1	(Canada)	Will Craig	Freshman	G	6' 2" (1.88 m)	229 lb (104 kg)	2002-05-16	Ennismore, Ontario	New Mexico Ice Wolves (NAHL)	—
2	(Canada)	Joaquim Lemay	Sophomore	D	6' 1" (1.85 m)	184 lb (83 kg)	2002-07-28	Saint-Pierre-les-Becquets, Quebec	Lincoln Stars (USHL)	WSH, 119th overall 2021
3	(Canada)	Kirby Proctor	Graduate	D	6' 3" (1.91 m)	206 lb (93 kg)	2001-04-20	Okotoks, Alberta	Des Moines Buccaneers (USHL)	—
6	(United States)	Zach Urdahl	Junior	F	6' 1" (1.85 m)	194 lb (88 kg)	2001-10-13	Eau Claire, Wisconsin	Wisconsin (Big Ten)	—
7	(United States)	Griffin Ludtke	Sophomore	D	5' 10" (1.78 m)	170 lb (77 kg)	2003-02-01	Elko, Minnesota	Sioux City Musketeers (USHL)	—
8	(Switzerland)	Ray Fust	Sophomore	F	6' 3" (1.91 m)	204 lb (93 kg)	2002-10-23	Bellinzona, Switzerland	Waterloo Black Hawks (USHL)	—
9	(United States)	Dom Vidoli	Graduate	D	6' 0" (1.83 m)	198 lb (90 kg)	1999-06-23	Wake Forest, North Carolina	Ohio State (Big Ten)	—
10	(Canada)	Jacob Guévin	Sophomore	D	5' 11" (1.8 m)	190 lb (86 kg)	2003-01-17	Drummondville, Quebec	Muskegon Lumberjacks (USHL)	—
11	(United States)	Nolan Sullivan (C)	Graduate	F	5' 11" (1.8 m)	210 lb (95 kg)	1999-05-21	Eden Prairie, Minnesota	Muskegon Lumberjacks (USHL)	—
12	(United States)	Nolan Krenzen	Senior	D	5' 10" (1.78 m)	187 lb (85 kg)	2001-07-13	Duluth, Minnesota	Omaha Lancers (USHL)	—
13	(Canada)	Jacob Slipec	Sophomore	F	5' 11" (1.8 m)	187 lb (85 kg)	2001-12-05	White Rock, British Columbia	Surrey Eagles (BCHL)	—
14	(Canada)	Jesse Lansdell	Graduate	F	5' 11" (1.8 m)	182 lb (83 kg)	1998-08-05	Surrey, British Columbia	Notre Dame (Big Ten)	—
15	(United States)	Noah Ellis	Sophomore	D	6' 3" (1.91 m)	192 lb (87 kg)	2002-02-01	Urbandale, Iowa	Massachusetts (HEA)	VGK, 184th overall 2020
16	(Canada)	Cam Mitchell	Sophomore	F	5' 9" (1.75 m)	181 lb (82 kg)	2001-03-09	Stony Plain, Alberta	Omaha Lancers (USHL)	—
18	(Canada)	Michael Abgrall	Sophomore	F	5' 11" (1.8 m)	172 lb (78 kg)	2003-10-25	Richmond, British Columbia	Surrey Eagles (BCHL)	—
19	(Canada)	Ty Mueller	Junior	F	5' 11" (1.8 m)	200 lb (91 kg)	2003-02-26	Cochrane, Alberta	Sherwood Park Crusaders (AJHL)	VAN, 105th overall 2023
21	(United States)	Tyler Rollwagen	Sophomore	F	5' 11" (1.8 m)	194 lb (88 kg)	2001-03-20	Bloomington, Minnesota	Fargo Force (USHL)	—
22	(United States)	Jimmy Glynn	Junior	F	5' 11" (1.8 m)	175 lb (79 kg)	2000-02-24	Lemont, Illinois	Dubuque Fighting Saints (USHL)	—
23	(United States)	Victor Mancini	Junior	D	6' 4" (1.93 m)	220 lb (100 kg)	2002-05-26	Saginaw, Michigan	Green Bay Gamblers (USHL)	NYR, 159th overall 2022
24	(United States)	Charlie Lurie	Freshman	F	5' 11" (1.8 m)	187 lb (85 kg)	2003-03-11	Minnetonka, Minnesota	Cedar Rapids RoughRiders (USHL)	—
26	(United States)	Brock Bremer	Senior	F	5' 6" (1.68 m)	151 lb (68 kg)	1999-08-26	Forest Lake, Minnesota	Lincoln Stars (USHL)	—
27	(United States)	Matt Miller (A)	Senior	F	6' 3" (1.91 m)	200 lb (91 kg)	1999-09-04	Leo, Indiana	Lincoln Stars (USHL)	—
28	(United States)	Jack Randl (A)	Graduate	F	5' 10" (1.78 m)	189 lb (86 kg)	2000-05-07	Carpentersville, Illinois	Omaha Lancers (USHL)	—
30	(Slovakia)	Šimon Latkoczy	Sophomore	G	5' 11" (1.8 m)	177 lb (80 kg)	2002-06-01	Trenčín, Slovakia	Madison Capitols (USHL)	—
32	(United States)	Seth Eisele	Graduate	G	6' 5" (1.96 m)	202 lb (92 kg)	1998-10-30	Stillwater, Minnesota	Lake Superior State (CCHA)	—
71	(United States)	Tanner Ludtke	Freshman	F	6' 0" (1.83 m)	180 lb (82 kg)	2004-11-27	Elko, Minnesota	Lincoln Stars (USHL)	ARI, 81st overall 2023

== Standings ==
2023–24 National Collegiate Hockey Conference Standings
	Conference record										Overall record					
	GP	W	L	T	OTW	OTL	SW	PTS	GF	GA	GP	W	L	T	GF	GA
#8 North Dakota †	24	15	8	1	1	4	0	49	87	67	40	26	12	2	151	105
#1 Denver *	24	15	7	2	3	0	1	45	110	80	44	32	9	3	202	120
#18 St. Cloud State	24	11	9	4	1	3	2	41	77	74	38	17	16	5	121	114
#15 Colorado College	24	14	8	2	5	2	0	41	66	56	37	21	13	3	111	93
#12 Omaha	24	13	8	3	5	0	3	40	68	74	40	23	13	4	117	112
#14 Western Michigan	24	11	13	0	1	5	0	35	78	64	38	21	16	1	136	97
Minnesota Duluth	24	8	14	2	3	3	2	28	65	80	37	12	20	5	103	125
Miami	24	1	21	2	0	2	0	7	44	100	36	7	26	3	78	135
Championship: March 23, 2024 † indicates conference regular season champion (Penrose Cup) * indicates conference tournament champion (Frozen Faceoff Championship Trophy); Rankings: USCHO.com Top 20 Poll; Updated: April 1, 2024

== Schedule and results ==
Date	Time	Opponent^{#}	Rank^{#}	Site	TV	Decision	Result	Attendance	Record
Exhibition
October 7	6:00 pm	at Minnesota State*		Mayo Clinic Health System Event Center • Mankato, Minnesota (Exhibition)		Latkoczy	W 1–0	4,145	
Regular Season
October 13	7:07 pm	Niagara*		Baxter Arena • Omaha, Nebraska		Latkoczy	W 8–1	6,393	1–0–0
October 14	7:07 pm	Niagara*		Baxter Arena • Omaha, Nebraska		Eisele	W 2–1	6,240	2–0–0
October 27	7:07 pm	#16 Ohio State*	#20	Baxter Arena • Omaha, Nebraska		Latkoczy	T 2–2 ^{OT}	6,402	2–0–1
October 28	7:07 pm	#16 Ohio State*	#20	Baxter Arena • Omaha, Nebraska		Eisele	L 0–4	6,254	2–1–1
November 3	7:07 pm	#11 Western Michigan		Baxter Arena • Omaha, Nebraska		Latkoczy	L 2–5	5,393	2–2–1 (0–1–0)
November 4	7:07 pm	#11 Western Michigan		Baxter Arena • Omaha, Nebraska		Latkoczy	W 3–2 ^{OT}	6,225	3–2–1 (1–1–0)
November 10	7:07 pm	Long Island*		Baxter Arena • Omaha, Nebraska		Latkoczy	W 3–2	7,802	4–2–1
November 11	7:07 pm	Long Island*		Baxter Arena • Omaha, Nebraska		Eisele	W 5–4 ^{OT}	7,802	5–2–1
November 17	8:00 pm	at #3 Denver		Magness Arena • Denver, Colorado		Latkoczy	L 4–8	5,940	5–3–1 (1–2–0)
November 18 / 19	7:00 pm / 3:00 pm	at #3 Denver		Magness Arena • Denver, Colorado		Latkoczy	W 4–3	5,813	6–3–1 (2–2–0)
November 24	7:07 pm	Augustana*		Baxter Arena • Omaha, Nebraska		Latkoczy	W 2–1	7,285	7–3–1
November 25	6:07 pm	at Augustana*		Denny Sanford Premier Center • Sioux Falls, South Dakota	FloHockey, Midco	Eisele	W 5–2	3,265	8–3–1
December 1	7:07 pm	at Minnesota Duluth	#20	AMSOIL Arena • Duluth, Minnesota		Latkoczy	L 2–4	5,889	8–4–1 (2–3–0)
December 2	5:07 pm	at Minnesota Duluth	#20	AMSOIL Arena • Duluth, Minnesota		Latkoczy	W 1–0	6,538	9–4–1 (3–3–0)
December 8	7:07 pm	#15 St. Cloud State		Baxter Arena • Omaha, Nebraska		Latkoczy	L 1–4	6,286	9–5–1 (3–4–0)
December 9	7:07 pm	#15 St. Cloud State		Baxter Arena • Omaha, Nebraska		Latkoczy	T 2–2 ^{SOW}	7,370	9–5–2 (3–4–1)
Desert Hockey Classic
January 5	4:30 pm	vs. Massachusetts Lowell*		Mullett Arena • Tempe, Arizona (Desert Hockey Semifinal)		Latkoczy	W 4–3 ^{OT}	4,764	10–5–2
January 6	8:00 pm	at #12 Arizona State*		Mullett Arena • Tempe, Arizona (Desert Hockey Championship)		Latkoczy	L 1–2 ^{OT}	4,912	10–6–2
January 12	7:07 pm	at #4 North Dakota		Ralph Engelstad Arena • Grand Forks, North Dakota	Midco	Latkoczy	W 5–4 ^{OT}	11,394	11–6–2 (4–4–1)
January 13	6:07 pm	at #4 North Dakota		Ralph Engelstad Arena • Grand Forks, North Dakota	Midco	Latkoczy	L 1–3	11,622	11–7–2 (4–5–1)
January 19	7:07 pm	#5 Denver	#19	Baxter Arena • Omaha, Nebraska		Latkoczy	L 3–6	7,391	11–8–2 (4–6–1)
January 20	7:07 pm	#5 Denver	#19	Baxter Arena • Omaha, Nebraska		Latkoczy	L 2–6	6,898	11–9–2 (4–7–1)
January 26	7:30 pm	at #15 St. Cloud State		Herb Brooks National Hockey Center • St. Cloud, Minnesota	Fox 9+	Latkoczy	W 7–6 ^{OT}	3,562	12–9–2 (5–7–1)
January 27	6:00 pm	at #15 St. Cloud State		Herb Brooks National Hockey Center • St. Cloud, Minnesota	Fox 9+	Eisele	T 1–1 ^{SOW}	—	12–9–3 (5–7–2)
February 2	7:07 pm	Minnesota Duluth	#20	Baxter Arena • Omaha, Nebraska	CBSSN	Latkoczy	W 5–1	7,075	13–9–3 (6–7–2)
February 3	7:07 pm	Minnesota Duluth	#20	Baxter Arena • Omaha, Nebraska		Latkoczy	W 4–3	7,802	14–9–3 (7–7–2)
February 9	6:00 pm	at #14 Western Michigan	#19	Lawson Arena • Kalamazoo, Michigan		Latkoczy	L 1–6	3,311	14–10–3 (7–8–2)
February 10	6:00 pm	at #14 Western Michigan	#19	Lawson Arena • Kalamazoo, Michigan		Latkoczy	W 3–2 ^{OT}	3,614	15–10–3 (8–8–2)
February 23	7:07 pm	#10 Colorado College	#19	Baxter Arena • Omaha, Nebraska		Latkoczy	W 3–0	7,802	16–10–3 (9–8–2)
February 24	7:07 pm	#10 Colorado College	#19	Baxter Arena • Omaha, Nebraska		Latkoczy	T 1–1 ^{SOW}	7,802	16–10–4 (9–8–3)
March 1	6:05 pm	at Miami	#18	Steve Cady Arena • Oxford, Ohio		Latkoczy	W 4–3	2,747	17–10–4 (10–8–3)
March 2	6:05 pm	at Miami	#18	Steve Cady Arena • Oxford, Ohio		Latkoczy	W 2–1	2,907	18–10–4 (11–8–3)
March 8	7:07 pm	#3 North Dakota	#16	Baxter Arena • Omaha, Nebraska		Latkoczy	W 3–2	7,802	19–10–4 (12–8–3)
March 9	7:07 pm	#3 North Dakota	#16	Baxter Arena • Omaha, Nebraska		Latkoczy	W 4–1	7,802	20–10–4 (13–8–3)
NCHC Tournament
March 15	8:07 pm	at #10 Colorado College*	#12	Ed Robson Arena • Colorado Springs, Colorado (Quarterfinal Game 1)		Latkoczy	L 3–4 ^{OT}	3,410	20–11–4
March 16	7:07 pm	at #10 Colorado College*	#12	Ed Robson Arena • Colorado Springs, Colorado (Quarterfinal Game 2)		Latkoczy	W 3–1	3,425	21–11–4
March 17	7:07 pm	at #10 Colorado College*	#12	Ed Robson Arena • Colorado Springs, Colorado (Quarterfinal Game 3)		Latkoczy	W 2–1	3,416	22–11–4
March 22	4:07 pm	vs. #4 North Dakota*	#11	Xcel Energy Center • Saint Paul, Minnesota (Semifinal)	CBSSN	Latkoczy	W 6–3	8,977	23–11–4
March 23	6:30 pm	vs. #3 Denver*	#11	Xcel Energy Center • Saint Paul, Minnesota (Championship)	CBSSN	Latkoczy	L 1–4	6,929	23–12–4
NCAA Tournament
March 28	7:30 pm	vs. #7 Minnesota*	#11	Denny Sanford PREMIER Center • Sioux Falls, South Dakota (West Regional Semifinal)	ESPNU	Latkoczy	L 2–3	5,691	23–13–4
*Non-conference game. ^{#}Rankings from USCHO.com Poll. All times are in Central Time. Source:

== NCAA Tournament ==
=== Regional semifinals ===
March 28, 2024; 7:30 pm	(2) Minnesota	3–2 (0–0, 1–1, 2–1)	(3) Omaha	Denny Sanford Premier Center; Attendance: 5,691

Game reference

Mathieu Caron
Goalies
Tommy Scarfone
Referees:
Jeremy Tufts
Terrence Murphy
Linesmen:
Steven Murray
Jeff McCorkle

	0–1	21:51 – PP – Joaquim Lemay (5) (Guévin, Bremer)
(Kurth) Jimmy Clark (5) – 38:01	1–1
	1–2	44:28 – Ty Mueller (4) (Randl, Lemay)
(Brodzinski) Jaxon Nelson (17) – 49:15	2–2
(Brodzinski) Jaxon Nelson (18) – GW – 55:47	3–2

9 min
Penalties
4 min
39
Shots
36

== Scoring statistics ==
Name	Position	Games	Goals	Assists	Points	PIM
Tanner Ludtke	C	40	11	17	28	28
Griffin Ludtke	D	40	4	23	27	27
Jack Randl	LW	39	13	13	26	10
Ty Mueller	F	40	11	15	26	33
Zach Urdahl	LW	34	13	12	25	4
Brock Bremer	LW	40	8	12	20	46
Matt Miller	RW	37	7	13	20	19
Joaquim Lemay	D	37	5	13	18	18
Nolan Sullivan	F	40	7	9	16	40
Kirby Proctor	D	40	7	8	15	8
Jimmy Glynn	F	39	9	6	15	14
Jesse Lansdell	F	39	3	12	15	74
Jacob Guévin	D	40	3	10	13	20
Nolan Krenzen	D	40	2	8	10	4
Victor Mancini	D	40	4	6	10	8
Ray Fust	LW/RW	37	4	5	9	12
Tyler Rollwagen	F	38	3	5	8	30
Jacob Slipec	F	30	2	2	4	6
Noah Ellis	D	21	0	3	3	6
Michael Abgrall	C	12	0	3	3	10
Dominic Vidoli	D	19	1	1	2	6
Cam Mitchell	LW	13	0	1	1	4
Charlie Lurie	F	4	0	1	1	2
Šimon Latkoczy	G	34	0	0	0	0
Seth Eisele	G	8	0	0	0	0
Total			117	198	315	433

== Goaltending statistics ==
Name	Games	Minutes	Wins	Losses	Ties	Goals against	Saves	Shut outs	SV %	GAA
Seth Eisele	9	405:29	4	1	1	16	181	0	.919	2.37
Šimon Latkoczy	34	2030:01	19	12	3	91	953	2	.913	2.69
Empty Net	-	14:45	-	-	-	5	-	-	-	-
Total	38	2450:15	23	13	4	112	1134	2	.910	2.74

== Rankings ==
Poll	Week																										
Poll	Pre	1	2	3	4	5	6	7	8	9	10	11	12	13	14	15	16	17	18	19	20	21	22	23	24	25	26 (Final)
USCHO.com	NR	NR	NR	20	NR	NR	NR	NR	20	NR	NR	–	NR	NR	19	NR	20	19	18	19	18	16	12	11	11	–	12
USA Hockey	NR	NR	NR	NR	NR	NR	NR	NR	NR	NR	NR	NR	–	NR	19	NR	19	19	18	19	18	17	13	11	12	12	13

Note: USCHO did not release a poll in weeks 11 or 25.
Note: USA Hockey did not release a poll in week 12.

== Awards and honors ==
Player	Award	Ref
Tanner Ludtke	NCHC Rookie Team	
Šimon Latkoczy	Frozen Faceoff All-Tournament Team	
Griffin Ludtke	Frozen Faceoff All-Tournament Team	
Zach Urdahl	Frozen Faceoff All-Tournament Team	

== 2024 NHL entry draft ==
Round	Pick	Player	NHL team
5	132	Louka Cloutier ^{†}	Colorado Avalanche

† incoming freshman
