= 2023–24 St. Cloud State Huskies men's ice hockey season =

- Conference: T–3rd NCHC
- Home ice: Herb Brooks National Hockey Center

Rankings
- USCHO: #18
- USA Hockey: #18

Record
- Overall: 17–16–5
- Conference: 11–9–4
- Home: 9–8–2
- Road: 6–7–3
- Neutral: 0–1–0

Coaches and captains
- Head coach: Brett Larson
- Assistant coaches: Dave Shyiak; R. J. Enga; Clark Kuster; Matt Bertram
- Captain: Dylan Anhorn
- Alternate captains: Josh Luedtke; Joe Molenaar; Zach Okabe

The 2023–24 St. Cloud State Huskies men's ice hockey season was the 89th season of play for the program, the 27th at the Division I level and 11th in the NCHC. The Huskies represented St. Cloud State University in the 2023–24 NCAA Division I men's ice hockey season, played their home games at Herb Brooks National Hockey Center and were coached by Brett Larson in his sixth season.

== Season ==
Entering the season, St. Cloud was set to have Dominic Basse as the primary starter while returning luminaries like Veeti Miettinen and Zach Okabe were expected to shoulder the load up front. Unfortunately, the Huskies didn't play well to start the season. Basse looked pedestrian in net while the offense struggled to get on track. However, after starting 2–4, St. Cloud picked up its game once conference play began. The Huskies went undefeated in their 8 NCHC matches during the first half of the season and planted themselves firmly atop the standings.

The team's outlook improved after the winter break when they swept Bemidji State to finish with a respectable non-conference record and only had to play well in the second half to give themselves a shot at the NCAA tournament. However, January was not kind to the Huskies; St. Cloud went through a 3-week stretch where they could not buy a win and the team began to see their postseason chances slip away. Basse's play was not up to par and twice the team turned to one of its freshmen goaltenders, but neither was able to seize the job. The Huskies recovered a bit in February, earning splits with both Colorado College and Western Michigan but Basse's poor play eventually led to him being replaced in goal by Isak Posch.

The change in goal seemed to work initially as Posch earned his first career shutout against the Broncos. However, he was less than effective over the final two weeks of the regular season. St. Cloud lost every game largely because they couldn't keep the puck out of the net. Basse was reinserted as the starter for the season finale but he proceeded to allow 6 goals on 30 shots and was back on the bench when the playoffs began. The losses to end the year cost St. Cloud a conference championship and dropped the team to 3rd in the NCHC standings.

Due to their tumble, the Huskies began the postseason facing Western Michigan, who were all but guaranteed a spot in the tournament at the time. Posch shook off his recent struggles and played a solid game while the offense got contributions for up and down the lineup. The combination allowed St. Cloud to take the first game but Western replied with a convincing win of their own in game two. With their season on the line, the Huskies leapt out to a fast start in the rubber match and had a 3-goal lead before the 12-minute mark. Posch stopped 32 of 33 shots to backstop a quarterfinal victory and keep the Huskies' alive.

As they were preparing for Denver in the semifinals, St. Cloud was right on the bubble of the NCAA tournament. Depending on how other games played out, it was possible for the team to earn an at-large bid if they could knock off the Pioneers even though they team was only 2 games above .500. Knowing that a loss would be the death knell for their season, the Huskies fought hard against the nation's top offensive team and tried to beat Denver at its own game. St. Cloud got four separate 1-goal leads in the match but they were unable to pull away from the Pioneers. Overtime was needed to settle the score and both teams fought hard to get the winning goal. Just past the 6-minute mark, Denver got a partial break in on Posch and deke right at the goal caught the netminder out of position. Josh Luedtke tried to sweep the puck away from the goal but he fanned on the attempt and could only watch as it slid into the net and ended their season.

== Departures ==
Player	Position	Nationality	Cause
Chase Brand	Forward	United States	Graduate transfer to Augustana
Brendan Bushy	Defenseman	United States	Graduation (signed with Kalamazoo Wings)
Jaxon Castor	Goaltender	United States	Graduation (signed with Florida Everblades)
Grant Cruikshank	Forward	United States	Graduation (signed with Toronto Marlies)
Jami Krannila	Defenseman	Finland	Graduation (signed with Wilkes-Barre/Scranton Penguins)
Spencer Meier	Defenseman	United States	Graduation (retired)
Micah Miller	Forward	United States	Graduation (signed with Tucson Roadrunners)
Aidan Spellacy	Forward	United States	Graduation (signed with Kalamazoo Wings)
Ondřej Trejbal	Defenseman	Czech Republic	Graduation (signed with SaiPa)
Brady Ziemer	Defenseman	United States	Transferred to Augustana

== Recruiting ==
Player	Position	Nationality	Age	Notes
Warren Clark	Defenseman	Canada	18	Riverside, ON; selected 179th overall in 2023
Tynan Ewart	Defenseman	Canada	21	Duncan, BC
Karl Falk	Defenseman	Sweden	23	Värmdö, SWE; transfer from Alaska
Tyson Gross	Forward	Canada	20	Calgary, AB
Verner Miettinen	Forward	Finland	20	Espoo, FIN
Nick Portz	Forward	United States	23	St. Cloud, MN; transfer from North Dakota
Isak Posch	Goaltender	Sweden	21	Umeå, SWE
Jack Reimann	Forward	United States	20	Ham Lake, MN
Kaleb Tiessen	Defenseman	Canada	21	Leamington, ON

== Roster ==
As of September 27, 2023.

No.	Nat.	Player	Class	Pos	Height	Weight	DoB	Hometown	Previous team	NHL rights
1	(Canada)	James Gray	Freshman (RS)	G	6' 3" (1.91 m)	195 lb (88 kg)	2002-05-24	Toronto, Ontario	North York Rangers (OJHL)	—
2	(Sweden)	Karl Falk	Junior	D	6' 3" (1.91 m)	205 lb (93 kg)	2000-01-20	Västerås, Sweden	Alaska (NCAA)	—
4	(Canada)	Dylan Anhorn	Graduate	D	6' 0" (1.83 m)	185 lb (84 kg)	1999-01-21	Calgary, Alberta	Union (ECAC)	—
5	(Canada)	Warren Clark	Freshman	D	6' 3" (1.91 m)	195 lb (88 kg)	2004-08-31	Riverside, Ontario	Steinbach Pistons (MJHL)	TBL, 179th overall 2023
6	(United States)	Mason Reiners	Sophomore	D	6' 1" (1.85 m)	195 lb (88 kg)	2001-05-03	Edina, Minnesota	Waterloo Black Hawks (USHL)	—
7	(United States)	Jack Reimann	Freshman	F	6' 0" (1.83 m)	195 lb (88 kg)	2002-10-10	Ham Lake, Minnesota	Des Moines Buccaneers (USHL)	—
8	(Canada)	Tynan Ewart	Freshman	D	6' 0" (1.83 m)	186 lb (84 kg)	2002-02-26	Duncan, British Columbia	Battlefords North Stars (SJHL)	—
10	(Canada)	Kyler Kupka	Graduate	F	6' 0" (1.83 m)	185 lb (84 kg)	1999-05-11	Camrose, Alberta	Camrose Kodiaks (AJHL)	—
11	(United States)	Grant Ahcan	Sophomore	F	5' 10" (1.78 m)	160 lb (73 kg)	2002-05-18	Savage, Minnesota	Cedar Rapids RoughRiders (USHL)	—
12	(Canada)	Ryan Rosborough	Sophomore (RS)	F	6' 3" (1.91 m)	190 lb (86 kg)	2000-05-24	Mt. Brydges, Ontario	South Shore Kings (NCDC)	—
13	(Canada)	Tyson Gross	Freshman	F	6' 3" (1.91 m)	185 lb (84 kg)	2002-09-23	Calgary, Alberta	Cedar Rapids RoughRiders (USHL)	—
14	(Canada)	Zach Okabe	Graduate	F	5' 9" (1.75 m)	170 lb (77 kg)	2001-01-04	Okotoks, Alberta	Grande Prairie Storm (AJHL)	—
15	(United States)	Barrett Hall	Freshman	F	6' 0" (1.83 m)	170 lb (77 kg)	2003-12-29	Apple Valley, Minnesota	Green Bay Gamblers (USHL)	SEA, 164th overall 2022
16	(United States)	Mason Salquist	Junior	F	5' 8" (1.73 m)	165 lb (75 kg)	2000-03-21	Grand Forks, North Dakota	Fargo Force (USHL)	—
17	(Canada)	Ethan AuCoin	Sophomore	F	6' 1" (1.85 m)	170 lb (77 kg)	2002-08-10	Calgary, Alberta	Lloydminster Bobcats (AJHL)	—
18	(United States)	Nick Portz	Junior	F	5' 11" (1.8 m)	180 lb (82 kg)	2000-05-15	St. Cloud, Minnesota	North Dakota (NCHC)	—
19	(Finland)	Verner Miettinen	Freshman	F	5' 11" (1.8 m)	172 lb (78 kg)	2003-04-07	Espoo, Finland	Fargo Force (USHL)	—
20	(United States)	Jack Rogers	Sophomore	F	6' 1" (1.85 m)	190 lb (86 kg)	2002-09-23	East Northport, New York	Steinbach Pistons (MJHL)	—
21	(United States)	Josh Luedtke	Junior	D	5' 9" (1.75 m)	175 lb (79 kg)	2000-09-29	Minnetonka, Minnesota	Des Moines Buccaneers (USHL)	—
22	(United States)	Joe Molenaar	Senior	F	6' 1" (1.85 m)	175 lb (79 kg)	1999-10-16	Minnetonka, Minnesota	Cedar Rapids RoughRiders (USHL)	—
23	(United States)	Jack Peart	Junior	D	5' 11" (1.8 m)	175 lb (79 kg)	2003-05-15	Grand Rapids, Minnesota	Grand Rapids High School (USHS–MN)	MIN, 54th overall 2021
26	(United States)	Cooper Wylie	Sophomore	D	6' 1" (1.85 m)	195 lb (88 kg)	2001-10-26	Stillwater, Minnesota	Waterloo Black Hawks (USHL)	—
27	(Canada)	Kaleb Tiessen	Freshman	D	6' 5" (1.96 m)	210 lb (95 kg)	2002-06-03	Leamington, Ontario	Maryland Black Bears (NAHL)	—
29	(Finland)	Veeti Miettinen	Senior	F	5' 9" (1.75 m)	160 lb (73 kg)	2001-09-20	Espoo, Finland	Kiekko-Espoo (Nuorten SM-liiga)	TOR, 168th overall 2020
30	(Sweden)	Isak Posch	Freshman	G	6' 3" (1.91 m)	210 lb (95 kg)	2002-01-03	Umeå, Sweden	Minnesota Wilderness (NAHL)	—
31	(United States)	Dominic Basse	Senior	G	6' 6" (1.98 m)	185 lb (84 kg)	2001-04-22	Alexandria, Virginia	Colorado College (USHL)	CHI, 167th overall 2019
34	(Canada)	Adam Ingram	Sophomore	F	6' 1" (1.85 m)	175 lb (79 kg)	2003-10-14	West St. Paul, Manitoba	Youngstown Phantoms (USHL)	NSH, 82nd overall 2022

== Standings ==
2023–24 National Collegiate Hockey Conference Standings
	Conference record										Overall record					
	GP	W	L	T	OTW	OTL	SW	PTS	GF	GA	GP	W	L	T	GF	GA
#8 North Dakota †	24	15	8	1	1	4	0	49	87	67	40	26	12	2	151	105
#1 Denver *	24	15	7	2	3	0	1	45	110	80	44	32	9	3	202	120
#18 St. Cloud State	24	11	9	4	1	3	2	41	77	74	38	17	16	5	121	114
#15 Colorado College	24	14	8	2	5	2	0	41	66	56	37	21	13	3	111	93
#12 Omaha	24	13	8	3	5	0	3	40	68	74	40	23	13	4	117	112
#14 Western Michigan	24	11	13	0	1	5	0	35	78	64	38	21	16	1	136	97
Minnesota Duluth	24	8	14	2	3	3	2	28	65	80	37	12	20	5	103	125
Miami	24	1	21	2	0	2	0	7	44	100	36	7	26	3	78	135
Championship: March 23, 2024 † indicates conference regular season champion (Penrose Cup) * indicates conference tournament champion (Frozen Faceoff Championship Trophy); Rankings: USCHO.com Top 20 Poll; Updated: April 1, 2024

== Schedule and results ==
Date	Time	Opponent^{#}	Rank^{#}	Site	TV	Decision	Result	Attendance	Record
Regular Season
October 7	6:00 pm	St. Thomas*	#8	Herb Brooks National Hockey Center • St. Cloud, Minnesota	Fox 9+	Basse	L 4–5 ^{OT}	4,863	0–1–0
October 8	4:07 pm	at St. Thomas*	#8	St. Thomas Ice Arena • Mendota Heights, Minnesota	FloHockey	Basse	W 1–0	556	1–1–0
October 13	7:07 pm	at Minnesota State*	#10	Mayo Clinic Health System Event Center • Mankato, Minnesota	FloHockey	Basse	L 2–3 ^{OT}	4,398	1–2–0
October 14	6:07 pm	at Minnesota State*	#10	Mayo Clinic Health System Event Center • Mankato, Minnesota	FloHockey	Basse	L 1–5	4,767	1–3–0
October 20	7:30 pm	Alaska*	#20	Herb Brooks National Hockey Center • St. Cloud, Minnesota	Fox 9+	Basse	W 4–1	3,626	2–3–0
October 21	6:00 pm	Alaska*	#20	Herb Brooks National Hockey Center • St. Cloud, Minnesota	Fox 9+	Basse	L 2–5	3,314	2–4–0
November 3	7:30 pm	Miami		Herb Brooks National Hockey Center • St. Cloud, Minnesota	Fox 9+	Basse	W 3–2	3,007	3–4–0 (1–0–0)
November 4	6:00 pm	Miami		Herb Brooks National Hockey Center • St. Cloud, Minnesota	Fox 9+	Basse	W 6–0	3,277	4–4–0 (2–0–0)
November 10	6:00 pm	at #12 Western Michigan		Lawson Arena • Kalamazoo, Michigan		Basse	W 3–2	3,943	5–4–0 (3–0–0)
November 11	5:00 pm	at #12 Western Michigan		Lawson Arena • Kalamazoo, Michigan		Basse	W 3–0	3,767	6–4–0 (4–0–0)
November 17	7:30 pm	Minnesota Duluth	#19	Herb Brooks National Hockey Center • St. Cloud, Minnesota	Fox 9+	Basse	W 2–1	3,627	7–4–0 (5–0–0)
November 18	6:00 pm	Minnesota Duluth	#19	Herb Brooks National Hockey Center • St. Cloud, Minnesota	Fox 9+	Basse	W 6–5	4,211	8–4–0 (6–0–0)
November 24	7:30 pm	#14 Michigan*	#17	Herb Brooks National Hockey Center • St. Cloud, Minnesota	Fox 9+	Basse	L 0–2	3,978	8–5–0
November 25	6:00 pm	#14 Michigan*	#17	Herb Brooks National Hockey Center • St. Cloud, Minnesota	Fox 9+	Basse	T 3–3 ^{OT}	4,014	8–5–1
December 8	7:00 pm	at Omaha	#15	Baxter Arena • Omaha, Nebraska		Basse	W 4–1	6,286	9–5–1 (7–0–0)
December 9	7:00 pm	at Omaha	#15	Baxter Arena • Omaha, Nebraska		Posch	T 2–2 ^{SOL}	7,370	9–5–2 (7–0–1)
December 29	7:07 pm	at Bemidji State*	#14	Sanford Center • Bemidji, Minnesota	FloHockey	Basse	W 6–1	3,998	10–5–2
December 30	6:00 pm	Bemidji State*	#14	Herb Brooks National Hockey Center • St. Cloud, Minnesota	Fox 9+	Posch	W 6–1	4,789	11–5–2
January 12	8:00 pm	at #6 Denver	#14	Magness Arena • Denver, Colorado	CBSSN	Basse	L 1–5	6,372	11–6–2 (7–1–1)
January 13	7:00 pm	at #6 Denver	#14	Magness Arena • Denver, Colorado		Posch	T 4–4 ^{SOW}	6,201	11–6–3 (7–1–2)
January 19	7:30 pm	#6 North Dakota	#13	Herb Brooks National Hockey Center • St. Cloud, Minnesota	Fox 9+	Basse	L 3–5	4,568	11–7–3 (7–2–2)
January 20	6:00 pm	#6 North Dakota	#13	Herb Brooks National Hockey Center • St. Cloud, Minnesota	Fox 9+	Basse	T 3–3 ^{SOW}	5,568	11–7–4 (7–2–3)
January 26	7:30 pm	Omaha	#15	Herb Brooks National Hockey Center • St. Cloud, Minnesota	Fox 9+	Basse	L 6–7 ^{OT}	3,562	11–8–4 (7–3–3)
January 27	6:00 pm	Omaha	#15	Herb Brooks National Hockey Center • St. Cloud, Minnesota	Fox 9+	Gray	T 1–1 ^{SOL}	—	11–8–5 (7–3–4)
February 2	8:00 pm	at #14 Colorado College	#16	Ed Robson Arena • Colorado Springs, Colorado	SOCO CW	Basse	W 2–1 ^{OT}	3,640	12–8–5 (8–3–4)
February 3	7:00 pm	at #14 Colorado College	#16	Ed Robson Arena • Colorado Springs, Colorado	SOCO CW	Basse	L 3–5	3,687	12–9–5 (8–4–4)
February 9	7:05 pm	at Miami	#16	Steve Cady Arena • Oxford, Ohio		Basse	W 5–2	2,311	13–9–5 (9–4–4)
February 10	7:05 pm	at Miami	#16	Steve Cady Arena • Oxford, Ohio		Posch	W 3–1	2,593	14–9–5 (10–4–4)
February 23	7:30 pm	#13 Western Michigan	#15	Herb Brooks National Hockey Center • St. Cloud, Minnesota	Fox 9+	Posch	L 3–4	3,502	14–10–5 (10–5–4)
February 24	6:00 pm	#13 Western Michigan	#15	Herb Brooks National Hockey Center • St. Cloud, Minnesota	Fox 9+	Posch	W 3–0	4,116	15–10–5 (11–5–4)
March 1	7:30 pm	#5 Denver	#15	Herb Brooks National Hockey Center • St. Cloud, Minnesota	Fox 9+	Posch	L 2–6	3,688	15–11–5 (11–6–4)
March 2	6:00 pm	#5 Denver	#15	Herb Brooks National Hockey Center • St. Cloud, Minnesota	Fox 9+	Posch	L 2–7	4,270	15–12–5 (11–7–4)
March 8	7:07 pm	at Minnesota Duluth	#17	AMSOIL Arena • Duluth, Minnesota		Posch	L 2–4	5,446	15–13–5 (11–8–4)
March 9	6:07 pm	at Minnesota Duluth	#17	AMSOIL Arena • Duluth, Minnesota		Basse	L 5–6	5,012	15–14–5 (11–9–4)
NCHC Tournament
March 15	7:37 pm	#14 Western Michigan*	#18	Herb Brooks National Hockey Center • St. Cloud, Minnesota (Quarterfinal Game 1)	Fox 9+	Posch	W 5–2	3,026	16–14–5
March 16	6:07 pm	#14 Western Michigan*	#18	Herb Brooks National Hockey Center • St. Cloud, Minnesota (Quarterfinal Game 2)	Fox 9+	Posch	L 1–6	2,495	16–15–5
March 17	6:07 pm	#14 Western Michigan*	#18	Herb Brooks National Hockey Center • St. Cloud, Minnesota (Quarterfinal Game 3)	Fox 9+	Posch	W 5–1	—	17–15–5
March 22	7:37 pm	vs. #3 Denver*	#17	Xcel Energy Center • Saint Paul, Minnesota (Semifinal)	CBSSN	Posch	L 4–5 ^{OT}	8,977	17–16–5
*Non-conference game. ^{#}Rankings from USCHO.com Poll. All times are in Central Time. Source:

== Scoring statistics ==
Name	Position	Games	Goals	Assists	Points	PIM
Veeti Miettinen	RW	37	20	15	35	0
Dylan Anhorn	D	38	6	27	33	34
Kyler Kupka	F	38	14	18	32	18
Adam Ingram	C	38	10	18	28	18
Zach Okabe	RW	38	10	14	24	21
Verner Miettinen	C	38	4	19	23	8
Tyson Gross	D	34	7	13	20	16
Mason Salquist	F	35	7	12	19	27
Josh Luedtke	D	37	4	13	17	21
Barrett Hall	C	33	8	8	16	16
Jack Peart	D	38	3	11	14	18
Joe Molenaar	F	32	8	4	12	19
Grant Ahcan	F	23	3	5	8	15
Ethan Aucoin	F	19	4	2	6	8
Jack Rogers	F	29	4	2	6	22
Cooper Wylie	D	38	3	3	6	15
Ryan Rosborough	F	20	3	2	5	19
Tynan Ewart	D	19	0	5	5	2
Nick Portz	F	17	2	2	4	14
Jack Reimann	F	25	1	2	3	12
Mason Reiners	D	26	0	3	3	4
Warren Clark	D	31	0	3	3	8
Karl Falk	D	33	0	2	2	6
Dominic Basse	G	25	0	1	1	2
James Gray	G	1	0	0	0	0
Kaleb Tiessen	D	6	0	0	0	0
Isak Posch	G	14	0	0	0	0
Total			121	204	325	343

== Goaltending statistics ==
Name	Games	Minutes	Wins	Losses	Ties	Goals against	Saves	Shut outs	SV %	GAA
James Gray	1	65:00	0	0	1	1	21	0	.955	0.92
Dominic Basse	25	1461:47	12	10	2	67	580	3	.896	2.75
Isak Posch	14	777:01	5	6	2	38	346	1	.901	2.93
Empty Net	-	24:13	-	-	-	8	-	-	-	-
Total	38	2328:01	17	16	5	114	947	4	.893	2.94

== Rankings ==
Poll	Week																										
Poll	Pre	1	2	3	4	5	6	7	8	9	10	11	12	13	14	15	16	17	18	19	20	21	22	23	24	25	26 (Final)
USCHO.com	8	10	20	NR	NR	NR	19	17	17	15	14	–	14	14	13	15	16	16	16	15	15	18	17	18	18	–	18
USA Hockey	7	9	20	NR	NR	NR	17	16	17	15	15	14	–	14	12т	14	15	16	15	15	13	18	17	17	17	18	18

Note: USCHO did not release a poll in weeks 11 and 25.
Note: USA Hockey did not release a poll in week 12.

== Awards and honors ==
Player	Award	Ref
Dylan Anhorn	AHCA West Second Team All-American	
Dylan Anhorn	NCHC First Team	
Jack Peart	NCHC Second Team	
Isak Posch	NCHC Rookie Team	

== 2024 NHL entry draft ==
Round	Pick	Player	NHL team
2	48	Colin Ralph ^{†}	St. Louis Blues
4	101	Tanner Henricks ^{†}	Columbus Blue Jackets
6	182	Austin Burnevik ^{†}	Anaheim Ducks

† incoming freshman
