= Ed Robson Arena =

Arena in Colorado Springs, Colorado

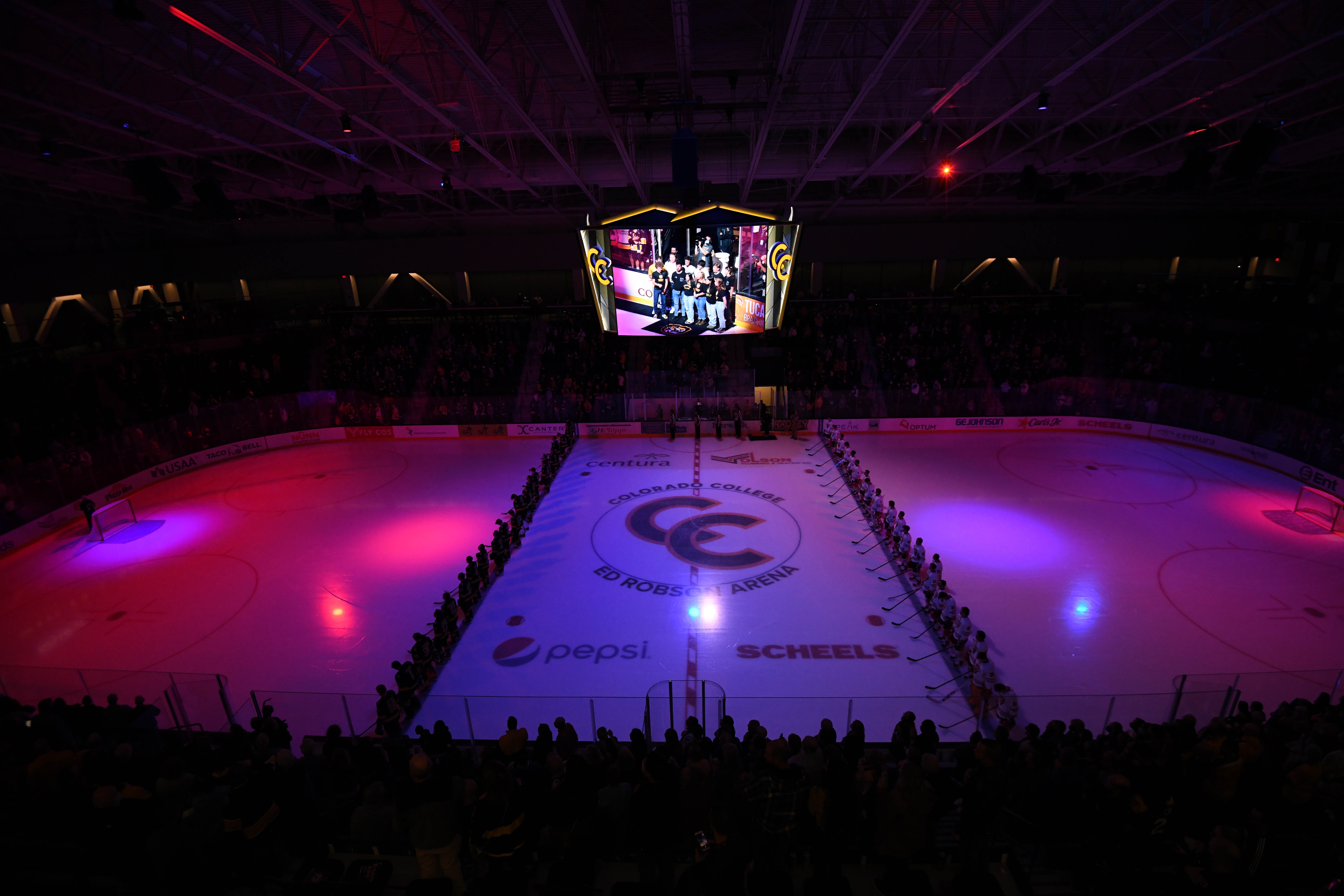
- Interactive map of Ed Robson Arena
- Location: 849 N. Tejon St., Colorado Springs, CO, 80903
- Coordinates: 38°50′47″N 104°49′17″W
- Owner: Colorado College
- Operator: Colorado College
- Capacity: 3,407
- Surface: 200' x 85' (hockey)

Construction
- Groundbreaking: February 15, 2020
- Opened: September 18, 2021
- Cost: $52 million (estimate)
- Architect: JLG Architects www.jlgarchitects.com

Tenant
- Colorado College Tigers ice hockey (2021–)

The Ed Robson Arena is a 3,400-seat ice hockey arena located on the campus of Colorado College in Colorado Springs, Colorado. The arena opened on September 18, 2021 and serves as the home of the school's men's ice hockey team, known as the Tigers.

== History ==
Plans for a school-run arena date as far back as 2008 in the Colorado College Long Range Development Plan. At the time of planning, the Robson arena would be the second smallest facility in the NCHC, ahead of just the Goggin Ice Center on the Miami University campus. Colorado College justified this decision due to both the small undergraduate size of the college (approximately 2,000) and the average actual attendance of Tiger games (about 2,800).

Construction started in February 2020 and in spite of the COVID-19 pandemic, the arena was opened ahead of schedule in mid-September 2021. It succeeded the Broadmoor World Arena as the home for the Colorado College Tigers ice hockey team and became the first on-campus home for the program after 82 years of operation.

== Namesake ==
The arena was named after Edward J. Robson, a 1954 graduate of Colorado College who played three years of varsity ice hockey. He is Chairman and CEO of his own real estate company, Robson Resort Communities.

== Events ==
Despite being a hockey arena, there are many other events that go on here. There is a multipurpose event room, 'Chapman Room' that is perfect for luncheons, meetings and class times. The Chapman Room has a small catering kitchen that is run by Bon Appétit, along with a decent size patio for warmer weather.
