= 2023–24 NCHC season =

- Season: 2023–24
- Conference: NCHC
- Division: Division I
- Sport: ice hockey
- Duration: October 7, 2023– March 9, 2023
- Number of teams: 8

NHL Entry Draft
- Top draft pick: Zeev Buium
- Picked by: Minnesota Wild

Regular season
- Season champions: North Dakota
- Season MVP: Jackson Blake
- Top scorer: Jackson Blake

NCHC Tournament
- Tournament champions: Denver
- Runners-up: Omaha
- Tournament MVP: McKade Webster
- Top scorer: Jackson Blake

NCAA Tournament
- Bids: 4
- Record: 4–3
- Best Finish: National Champion
- Team(s): Denver; North Dakota; Omaha; Western Michigan

The 2023–24 NCHC season was the 11th season of play for the National Collegiate Hockey Conference and took place during the 2023–24 NCAA Division I men's ice hockey season. The season began on October 7, 2023, and concluded on March 9, 2023.

== Coaches ==
=== Records ===
Team	Head coach	Season at school	Record at school	NCHC record
Colorado College	Kris Mayotte	3	22–46–6	12–32–3
Denver	David Carle	6	116–53–13	68–42–9
Miami	Chris Bergeron	5	28–90–13	17–71–9
Minnesota Duluth	Scott Sandelin	24	444–368–96	127–93–21
North Dakota	Brad Berry	9	180–92–31	112–62–19
Omaha	Mike Gabinet	7	94–101–12	61–74–9
St. Cloud State	Brett Larson	6	106–60–16	66–42–12
Western Michigan	Pat Ferschweiler	3	49–27–2	29–18–2

== Standings ==
2023–24 National Collegiate Hockey Conference Standings
	Conference record										Overall record					
	GP	W	L	T	OTW	OTL	SW	PTS	GF	GA	GP	W	L	T	GF	GA
#8 North Dakota †	24	15	8	1	1	4	0	49	87	67	40	26	12	2	151	105
#1 Denver *	24	15	7	2	3	0	1	45	110	80	44	32	9	3	202	120
#18 St. Cloud State	24	11	9	4	1	3	2	41	77	74	38	17	16	5	121	114
#15 Colorado College	24	14	8	2	5	2	0	41	66	56	37	21	13	3	111	93
#12 Omaha	24	13	8	3	5	0	3	40	68	74	40	23	13	4	117	112
#14 Western Michigan	24	11	13	0	1	5	0	35	78	64	38	21	16	1	136	97
Minnesota Duluth	24	8	14	2	3	3	2	28	65	80	37	12	20	5	103	125
Miami	24	1	21	2	0	2	0	7	44	100	36	7	26	3	78	135
Championship: March 23, 2024 † indicates conference regular season champion (Penrose Cup) * indicates conference tournament champion (Frozen Faceoff Championship Trophy); Rankings: USCHO.com Top 20 Poll; Updated: April 1, 2024

== Non-Conference record ==
Only one conference member (St. Cloud State) ended up with a losing record in non-conference play. While this, ordinarily, would put the NCHC in good standing, several of the teams had very weak opponents. This was typified by Western Michigan, whose strongest opponent on the season was St. Lawrence (48th in the pairwise). The result was that, despite finishing 33 games over .500, the NCHC finished behind the Big Ten and Hockey East in ranking average.

=== Regular season record ===
Team	Atlantic Hockey	Big Ten	CCHA	ECAC Hockey	Hockey East	Independent	Total
Colorado College	1–0–0	1–1–0	0–1–0	2–0–0	0–0–0	2–1–1	6–3–1
Denver	3–0–0	0–0–0	0–0–1	2–0–0	1–1–0	3–1–0	9–2–1
Miami	4–2–0	0–0–0	1–1–0	0–0–0	0–0–0	1–0–1	6–3–1
Minnesota Duluth	1–0–0	0–1–1	3–0–2	0–2–0	0–1–0	0–0–0	4–4–3
North Dakota	1–0–0	2–1–0	3–0–1	0–0–0	1–1–0	2–0–0	9–2–1
Omaha	2–0–0	0–1–1	2–0–0	0–0–0	1–0–0	2–1–0	7–2–1
St. Cloud State	0–0–0	0–1–1	3–3–0	0–0–0	0–0–0	1–1–0	4–5–1
Western Michigan	0–0–0	0–0–0	3–0–1	2–0–0	0–0–0	4–0–0	9–0–1
Overall	12–2–0	3–5–3	15–5–5	6–2–0	3–3–0	15–4–2	54–21–10

== Statistics ==
=== Leading scorers ===
GP = Games played; G = Goals; A = Assists; Pts = Points; PIM = Penalties in minutes

Player	Class	Team	GP	G	A	Pts	PIM
Jackson Blake	Sophomore	North Dakota	23	11	25	36	14
Zeev Buium	Freshman	Denver	24	6	25	31	14
Noah Laba	Sophomore	Colorado College	24	16	12	28	23
Jack Devine	Junior	Denver	24	12	16	28	8
Shai Buium	Junior	Denver	24	6	20	26	10
Cameron Berg	Junior	North Dakota	23	15	10	25	4
Sam Colangelo	Senior	Western Michigan	24	11	13	24	21
Luke Grainger	Senior	Western Michigan	24	9	15	24	13
Tristan Broz	Junior	Denver	24	8	15	23	13
Massimo Rizzo	Sophomore	Denver	16	4	19	23	8

=== Leading goaltenders ===
Minimum 1/3 of team's minutes played in conference games.
GP = Games played; Min = Minutes played; W = Wins; L = Losses; T = Ties; GA = Goals against; SO = Shutouts; SV% = Save percentage; GAA = Goals against average

Player	Class	Team	GP	Min	W	L	T	GA	SO	SV%	GAA
Kaiden Mbereko	Sophomore	Colorado College	24	1448:51	14	8	2	52	0	.927	2.15
Cameron Rowe	Senior	Western Michigan	24	1433:01	11	13	0	61	1	.903	2.55
Ludvig Persson	Senior	North Dakota	22	1362:32	15	7	1	62	3	.898	2.73
Dominic Basse	Senior	St. Cloud State	16	956:20	9	5	1	45	2	.894	2.82
Matt Davis	Junior	Denver	16	925:09	10	4	2	44	1	.907	2.85

== Conference tournament ==
Teams are reseeded for the semifinals.

Quarterfinals; March 15–17
1	North Dakota	5	7	-
8	Miami	1	1	-
2	Denver	4	5	-
7	Minnesota Duluth	0	2	-
3	St. Cloud State	5	1	5
6	Western Michigan	2	6	1
4	Colorado College	4*	1	1
5	Omaha	3	3	2

Semifinals; March 22
1	North Dakota	3
5	Omaha	6
2	Denver	5*
3	St. Cloud State	4

Championship; March 23
5	Omaha	1
2	Denver	4

Note: * denotes overtime period(s)

== Ranking ==
=== USCHO ===
Team	Pre	1	2	3	4	5	6	7	8	9	10	12	13	14	15	16	17	18	19	20	21	22	23	24	Final
Colorado College	NR	NR	NR	NR	NR	NR	NR	NR	NR	NR	20	20	17	18	16	14	15	15	10	11	10	10	12	15	15
Denver	4	3	2	2	2	2	3	4	3	4	5	6	6	5	4	5	6	5	3	5	4	3	3	3	1
Miami	NR	NR	NR	NR	NR	NR	NR	NR	NR	NR	NR	NR	NR	NR	NR	NR	NR	NR	NR	NR	NR	NR	NR	NR	NR
Minnesota Duluth	17	17	14	11	14	18	NR	NR	NR	NR	NR	NR	NR	NR	NR	NR	NR	NR	NR	NR	NR	NR	NR	NR	NR
North Dakota	7	7	5	4	3	4	2	1	2	1	4	4	4	6	5	2	2	2	4	3	3	5	4	5	8
Omaha	NR	NR	NR	20	NR	NR	NR	NR	20	NR	NR	NR	NR	19	NR	20	19	18	19	18	16	12	11	11	12
St. Cloud State	8	10	20	NR	NR	NR	19	17	17	15	14	14	14	13	15	16	16	16	15	15	17	18	17	18	18
Western Michigan	12	12	9	10	11	12	16	15	14	13	12	11	10	11	12	15	14	13	13	12	15	14	15	14	14

USCHO did not release a poll in weeks 11 and 25.

=== USA Hockey ===
Team	Pre	1	2	3	4	5	6	7	8	9	10	11	13	14	15	16	17	18	19	20	21	22	23	24	25	Final
Colorado College	NR	NR	NR	NR	NR	NR	NR	NR	NR	NR	20	20	18	18	17	16	15	16	10	14	12	10	13	15	15	15
Denver	5	3	2	2	2	2	2	4	3	5	5	5	6	6	4	6	6	5	3	4	4	3	3	3	3	1
Miami	NR	NR	NR	NR	NR	NR	NR	NR	NR	NR	NR	NR	NR	NR	NR	NR	NR	NR	NR	NR	NR	NR	NR	NR	NR	NR
Minnesota Duluth	17	18	14	12	14	18	NR	NR	NR	NR	NR	NR	NR	NR	NR	NR	NR	NR	NR	NR	NR	NR	NR	NR	NR	NR
North Dakota	8	7	5	4	4	4	4	1	2	1	4	4	4	7	5	2	2	2	5	3	3	5	4	5	8	8
Omaha	NR	NR	NR	NR	NR	NR	NR	NR	NR	NR	NR	NR	NR	19	NR	19	19	18	19	18	17	13	11	12	12	13
St. Cloud State	7	9	18	NR	NR	NR	17	16	17	15	15	14	14	12	14	15	16	15	15	13	16	18	17	17	18	18
Western Michigan	10	12	10	10	11	12	16	15	15	13	12	12	10	11	12	14	14	13	12	11	14	12	15	13	14	14

USA Hockey did not release a poll in week 12.

=== Pairwise ===
Team	1	2	3	4	5	6	7	8	9	10	12	13	14	15	16	17	18	19	20	21	22	23	Final
Colorado College	32	18	7	18	20	16	26	25	29	24	23	16	18	18	18	17	17	11	15	11	11	14	15
Denver	1	14	21	11	2	4	7	4	7	8	8	6	8	6	6	8	7	5	6	3	3	3	3
Miami	11	13	4	4	31	36	43	43	41	43	45	41	40	44	43	44	47	47	45	46	47	49	49
Minnesota Duluth	23	30	22	35	28	41	41	47	39	33	33	32	31	25	26	26	25	26	27	28	26	30	30
North Dakota	32	2	6	15	8	7	4	6	1	5	6	6	7	3	2	2	2	3	3	3	3	3	6
Omaha	32	45	44	33	43	38	21	19	21	23	23	23	18	20	19	19	17	18	17	16	11	11	10
St. Cloud State	15	37	41	52	23	14	12	13	14	14	13	12	12	11	13	14	13	11	11	14	15	14	15
Western Michigan	32	16	2	16	12	30	15	13	12	11	10	10	10	10	14	11	11	10	12	15	13	13	13

Note: Teams ranked in the top-10 automatically qualify for the NCAA tournament. Teams ranked 11-16 can qualify based upon conference tournament results.

== Awards ==
=== NCAA ===
Award	Recipient
Tournament Most Outstanding Player	Matt Davis, Denver
AHCA All-American Teams
West First Team	Position
Kaidan Mbereko, Colorado College	G
Zeev Buium, Denver	D
Jackson Blake, North Dakota	F
Jack Devine, Denver	F
West Second Team	Position
Dylan Anhorn, St. Cloud State	D
Noah Laba, Colorado College	F
Massimo Rizzo, Denver	F
NCAA All-Tournament team
Matt Davis, Denver	G
Sean Behrens, Denver	D
Zeev Buium, Denver	D
Tristan Broz, Denver	F
Rieger Lorenz, Denver	F

=== NCHC ===
Award		Recipient
Player of the Year		Jackson Blake, North Dakota
Rookie of the Year		Zeev Buium, Denver
Goaltender of the Year		Kaidan Mbereko, Colorado College
Forward of the Year		Jackson Blake, North Dakota
Defensive Defenseman of the Year		Sean Behrens, Denver
Offensive Defenseman of the Year		Zeev Buium, Denver
Defensive Forward of the Year		Noah Laba, Colorado College
Scholar-Athlete of the Year		Luke Grainger, Western Michigan
Three Stars Award		Noah Laba, Colorado College
Sportsmanship Award		Darian Gotz, Minnesota Duluth
Herb Brooks Coach of the Year		Kris Mayotte, Colorado College
Frozen Faceoff MVP		McKade Webster, Denver
All-NCHC Teams
First Team	Position	Second Team
Kaidan Mbereko, Colorado College	G	Ludvig Persson, North Dakota
Zeev Buium, Denver	D	Shai Buium, Denver
Dylan Anhorn, St. Cloud State	D	Jack Peart, St. Cloud State
Jackson Blake, North Dakota	F	Luke Grainger, Western Michigan
Jack Devine, Denver	F	Massimo Rizzo, Denver
Noah Laba, Colorado College	F	Ben Steeves, Minnesota Duluth
Honorable Mention	Position	Rookie Team
Simon Latkoczy, Omaha	G	Isak Posch, St. Cloud State
Sean Behrens, Denver	D	Zeev Buium, Denver
Jake Livanavage, North Dakota	D	Jake Livanavage, North Dakota
Garrett Pyke, North Dakota	D	
Cameron Berg, North Dakota	F	Miko Matikka, Denver
Sam Colangelo, Western Michigan	F	Alex Bump, Western Michigan
Riese Gaber, North Dakota	F	Tanner Ludtke, Omaha
Frozen Faceoff All-Tournament Team
Simon Latkoczy, Omaha	G	
Zeev Buium, Denver	D	
Griffin Ludtke, Omaha	D	
McKade Webster, Denver	F	
Zach Urdahl, Omaha	F	
Miko Matikka, Denver	F	

== 2024 NHL entry draft ==
Round	Pick	Player	College	NHL team
1	12	Zeev Buium	Denver	Minnesota Wild
1	18	Sacha Boisvert ^{†}	North Dakota	Chicago Blackhawks
1	30	E. J. Emery ^{†}	North Dakota	New York Rangers
2	42	Adam Kleber ^{†}	Minnesota Duluth	Buffalo Sabres
2	47	Max Plante ^{†}	Minnesota Duluth	Detroit Red Wings
2	48	Colin Ralph ^{†}	St. Cloud State	St. Louis Blues
3	76	William Zellers ^{†}	North Dakota	Colorado Avalanche
4	101	Tanner Henricks ^{†}	St. Cloud State	Columbus Blue Jackets
4	121	Jake Fisher ^{†}	Denver	Colorado Avalanche
4	128	Hagen Burrows ^{†}	Denver	Tampa Bay Lightning
5	132	Louka Cloutier ^{†}	Omaha	Colorado Avalanche
6	175	Joona Vaisanen ^{†}	Western Michigan	Pittsburgh Penguins
6	182	Austin Burnevik ^{†}	St. Cloud State	Anaheim Ducks
6	185	Tory Pitner ^{†}	Denver	Colorado Avalanche
7	198	James Reeder ^{†}	Denver	Los Angeles Kings
7	207	Mac Swanson ^{†}	North Dakota	Pittsburgh Penguins
7	208	Fisher Scott ^{†}	Colorado College	Detroit Red Wings

† incoming freshman
