= 2023–24 North Dakota Fighting Hawks men's ice hockey season =

Ice Breaker Tournament, champion NCHC, champion NCAA tournament, regional semifinal
- Conference: 1st NCHC
- Home ice: Ralph Engelstad Arena

Rankings
- USCHO: #8
- USA Hockey: #8

Record
- Overall: 26–12–2
- Conference: 15–8–1
- Home: 19–4–1
- Road: 7–6–1
- Neutral: 0–2–0

Coaches and captains
- Head coach: Brad Berry
- Assistant coaches: Dane Jackson; Karl Goehring; Dillon Simpson
- Captain: Riese Gaber
- Alternate captain(s): Carson Albrecht; Louis Jamernik; Keaton Pehrson; Jake Schmaltz

The 2023–24 North Dakota Fighting Hawks men's ice hockey season was the 84th season of play for the program and 11th in the NCHC. The Fighting Hawks represented the University of North Dakota in the 2023–24 NCAA Division I men's ice hockey season, played their home games at Ralph Engelstad Arena and were coached by Brad Berry in his 9th season.

== Season ==
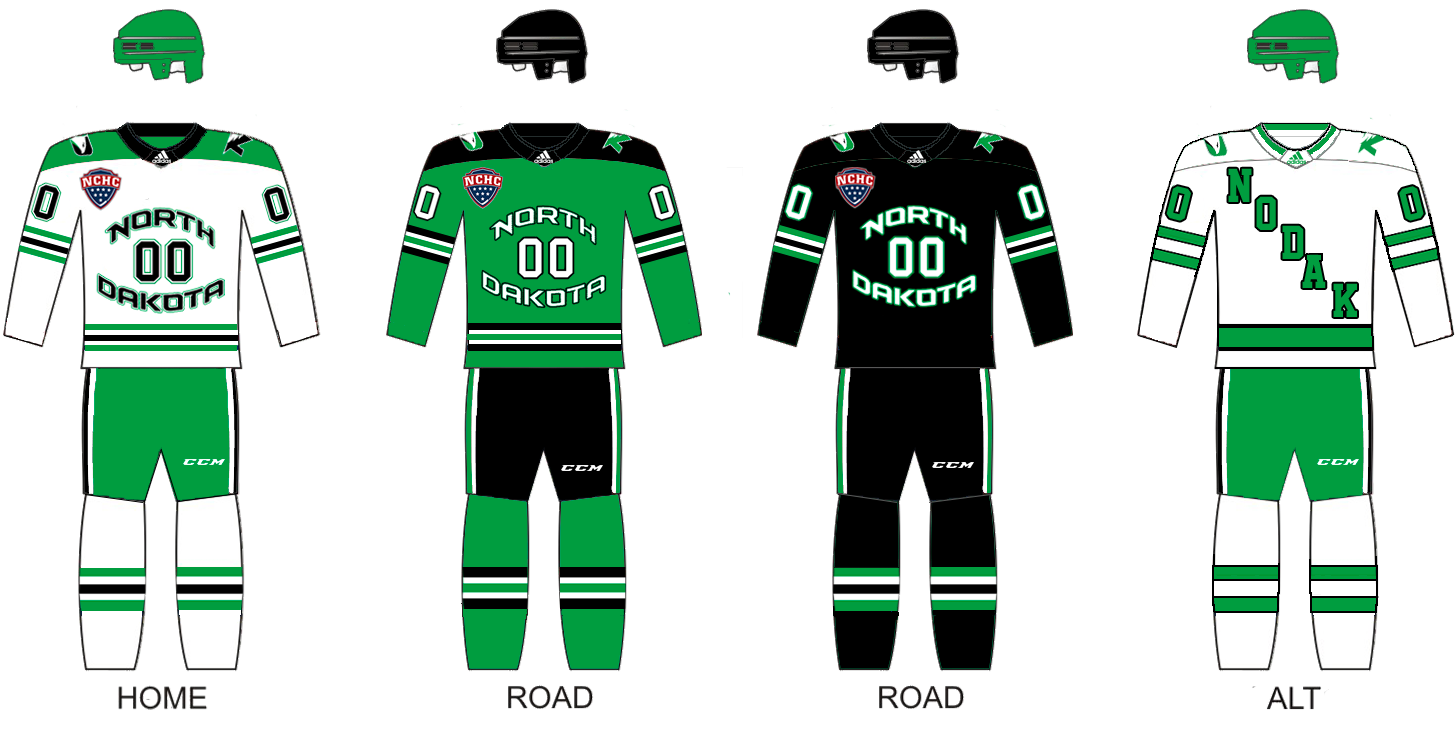
2023-24 Season Uniforms

With so many changes to the team's lineup, North Dakota was a complete mystery at the start of the season. Senior transfer Ludvig Persson was the only goaltender on the roster with any experience but his performance over the last two years had been less than stellar. However, how much of that was a result of his own shortcomings rather than his team's poor defense was unknown. To help out their new goaltender, North Dakota's entire defense had to be replaced. Not a single blueliner from '23 returned to the team but the revamped group was not completely devoid of experience. Four incoming defenders were transfers who had already seen their fare share of college action. Up front, the situation wasn't quite as desperate but North Dakota still had several new forwards for '24.

North Dakota debuted their new team by hosting the Ice Breaker Tournament and demonstrated that their training camp had been put to good use. The team won the tournament with many of the new players performing well, particularly Hunter Johannes who finished with 3 goals (2 on the penalty kill). The Fighting Hawks suffered their first defeat of the year the following week but they did manage to earn a split with #1 Minnesota in a continuation of their long-standing rivalry. By the beginning of November, The team was being supplied with goals from several players but had yet to find the heart of their offense. Jackson Blake took matters into his own hands and went of a tear that lasted the rest of the season. The sophomore had led the team in scoring the year before but now took his offense to a new level. Blake sparked the offense in November, scoring in seven of eight games and guiding the team on an eight-game winning streak. As the victories piled up, North Dakota rose to #1 in the nation and looked strong even when they lost to #3 Denver at the beginning of December.

Just before the winter break, the Hawks ran into a hot goalie and lost consecutive games against Colorado College. For the first time all season, the team showed a weakness and lost three 2–3 decisions (all in overtime). TO make matters worse, Persson suffered an injury over Christmas and the team had to turn to untested Hobie Hedquist when they began the second half of the season. Despite some jitters in the first few games, Hedquist played well in relief and helped to the Fighting Hawks back on track and Persson eventually was able to work himself back into the lineup. With the offense continuing to fire on all cylinders, the team remained atop the conference standings and got back up to #2 in the national polls by the beginning of February.

In the middle of the month, North Dakota suffered its worst weekend of the season and were swept by Colorado College for a second time. The lopsided losses called Persson's health into question but he answered with two shutouts over the next four weeks to quell any worries. As the team entered the final week of the season, North Dakota had already wrapped up the top seed for the NCHC tournament and were eyeing one of the four 1-seeds for the NCAA tournament. While losing the season finale to Omaha didn't help their case, North Dakota suffered a bigger loss during the week when Persson went down to injury for a second time.

At the opening of the tournament, UND hosted the worst team in the conference, Miami, and had a relatively easy time dispatching the RedHawks. The offense was on full display while Hedquist got to work himself back into game condition with his first action in almost a month. Unfortunately, Persson was still unable to play when the team headed to Saint Paul so the Hawks had to rely on Hedquist to get them over the hump against Omaha. Despite scoring first, North Dakota was unable to get on track offensively and eventually the Maverick offense took over. UND Found itself down 1–3 near the end of the second and, though they were able to score twice more, Omaha kept up the pressure and pumped three more into the goal in the third. The loss dropped North Dakota to 2–7 in NCHC semifinals and prevented any chance of the Hawks getting a 1-seed.

The Hawks slipped down to 6th in the PairWise ranking which caused them to be sent to the Midwest Regional where they faced Michigan in the opening round. While North Dakota had one of the top offenses in the nation, their opponents were even better on offense. North Dakota would have to hope the return of Persson would allow their defense to rise to the challenge. At the start, at least, thing looked to be going in North Dakota's favor. Johannes opened the scoring less than 5 minutes into the game while Persson only had to stop 4 shots in the first period. Michigan picked up the pace in the second, tying the score in the opening minutes but Blake was able to get his team back into the lead before the midway point. Unfortunately, while North Dakota had the lead, they were unable to add to their advantage. The Hawks entered the final period with their narrow lead but soon found themselves in trouble. Less than a minute into the period, Persson tried to kick a slow-rolling puck away from the crease but it rebounded off of Keaton Pehrson's skate and into the cage. 90 seconds later, Persson was unable to control a rebound and Michigan pounced on it to grab their first lead of the game. The Wolverines continued to press and with less than 10 minutes to play, they increased their lead when Persson was unable to stop a one-timer on a rush. North Dakota fought desperately to tie the game and Jackson Kunz did his part by firing a rebound short-side. In the final 5 minutes, however, the Hawks were unable to solve Michigan's goaltender and North Dakota's season came to a close.

== Departures ==
Player	Position	Nationality	Cause
Luke Bast	Defenseman	Canada	Transferred to Minnesota Duluth
Judd Caulfield	Forward	United States	Graduation (signed with Anaheim Ducks)
Matteo Costantini	Forward	Canada	Transferred to Western Michigan
Drew DeRidder	Goaltender	United States	Graduation (signed with Cincinnati Cyclones)
Michael Emerson	Forward	United States	Returned to juniors mid-season (Chicago Steel; later transferred to Merrimack)
Ty Farmer	Defenseman	United States	Graduation (signed with Allen Americans)
Ethan Frisch	Defenseman	United States	Graduation (signed with San Jose Barracuda)
Gavin Hain	Forward	United States	Graduation (signed with Iowa Heartlanders)
Jakob Hellsten	Goaltender	Sweden	Transferred to New Hampshire
Chris Jandric	Defenseman	Canada	Graduation (signed with Rochester Americans)
Brent Johnson	Defenseman	United States	Transferred to Ohio State
Tyler Kleven	Defenseman	United States	Signed professional contract (Ottawa Senators)
Cooper Moore	Defenseman	United States	Transferred to Quinnipiac
Nick Portz	Forward	United States	Transferred to St. Cloud State
Mark Senden	Forward	United States	Graduation (signed with Charlotte Checkers)
Ryan Sidorski	Defenseman	United States	Graduation (signed with Milwaukee Admirals)

== Recruiting ==
Player	Position	Nationality	Age	Notes
Nate Benoit	Defenseman	United States	20	Concord, NH; selected 182nd overall in 2021
Cameron Berg	Forward	United States	21	West Fargo, ND; transfer from Omaha; selected 125th overall in 2021
Logan Britt	Defenseman	United States	24	Crystal Lake, IL; graduate transfer from Sacred Heart
Michael Emerson	Forward	United States	19	Yorktown Heights, NY; selected 190th overall in 2023
Hobie Hedquist	Goaltender	United States	20	Heron Lake, MN
Hunter Johannes	Forward	United States	25	Eden Prairie, MN; graduate transfer from Lindenwood
Tanner Komzak	Defenseman	Canada	21	North Vancouver, BC
Jake Livanavage	Defenseman	United States	19	Gilbert, AZ
Keaton Pehrson	Defenseman	United States	24	Lakeville, MN; graduate transfer from Michigan
Jayden Perron	Forward	Canada	18	Winnipeg, MB; selected 94th overall in 2023
Ludvig Persson	Goaltender	Sweden	23	Gothenburg, SWE; transfer from Miami
Garrett Pyke	Defenseman	Canada	24	Etobicoke, ON; graduate transfer from Alaska
Abram Wiebe	Defenseman	Canada	20	Mission, BC; selected 209th overall in 2022
Bennett Zmolek	Defenseman	United States	21	Rochester, MN; transfer from Minnesota State

== Roster ==
As of August 21, 2023.

No.	Nat.	Player	Class	Pos	Height	Weight	DoB	Hometown	Previous team	NHL rights
1	(United States)	Kaleb Johnson	Sophomore	G	6' 0" (1.83 m)	181 lb (82 kg)	2001-01-07	Grand Forks, North Dakota	Minnesota Wilderness (NAHL)	—
2	(United States)	Bennett Zmolek	Sophomore (RS)	D	6' 2" (1.88 m)	193 lb (88 kg)	2002-04-17	Rochester, Minnesota	Minnesota State (CCHA)	—
4	(United States)	Jake Livanavage	Freshman	D	5' 10" (1.78 m)	183 lb (83 kg)	2004-05-06	Phoenix, Arizona	Chicago (USHL)	—
5	(United States)	Dane Montgomery	Sophomore (RS)	F	5' 10" (1.78 m)	169 lb (77 kg)	2002-01-07	Grand Forks, North Dakota	Waterloo (USHL)	—
6	(United States)	Logan Britt	Graduate	D	6' 2" (1.88 m)	185 lb (84 kg)	1999-02-10	Crystal Lake, Illinois	Sacred Heart (AHA)	—
7	(Canada)	Garrett Pyke	Graduate	D	6' 0" (1.83 m)	191 lb (87 kg)	1999-08-01	Toronto, Ontario	Alaska (NCAA)	—
8	(United States)	Jake Schmaltz (A)	Junior	F	6' 2" (1.88 m)	186 lb (84 kg)	2001-04-24	McFarland, Wisconsin	Green Bay (USHL)	BOS, 192nd overall 2019
9	(United States)	Jackson Blake	Sophomore	F	5' 11" (1.8 m)	173 lb (78 kg)	2003-08-03	Eden Prairie, Minnesota	Chicago (USHL)	CAR, 109th overall 2021
10	(Canada)	Tanner Komzak	Freshman	D	6' 4" (1.93 m)	207 lb (94 kg)	2002-06-30	West Kelowna, British Columbia	Whitecourt (AJHL)	—
11	(United States)	Griffin Ness	Senior	F	6' 0" (1.83 m)	184 lb (83 kg)	1999-12-10	Wayzata, Minnesota	Waterloo (USHL)	—
13	(Canada)	Carson Albrecht (A)	Graduate	F	5' 10" (1.78 m)	190 lb (86 kg)	1998-05-23	Martensville, Saskatchewan	Melfort (SJHL)	—
14	(United States)	Cameron Berg	Junior	F	5' 11" (1.8 m)	200 lb (91 kg)	2002-01-29	West Fargo, North Dakota	Omaha (NCHC)	NYI, 125th overall 2021
15	(United States)	Nate Benoit	Freshman	D	6' 0" (1.83 m)	183 lb (83 kg)	2002-11-26	Bow, New Hampshire	Waterloo (USHL)	MIN, 182nd overall 2021
17	(Canada)	Riese Gaber (C)	Senior	F	5' 8" (1.73 m)	170 lb (77 kg)	1999-10-10	Gilbert Plains, Manitoba	Dubuque (USHL)	—
18	(Canada)	Jayden Perron	Freshman	F	5' 9" (1.75 m)	160 lb (73 kg)	2005-01-11	Winnipeg, Manitoba	Chicago (USHL)	CAR, 94th overall 2023
20	(United States)	Keaton Pehrson (A)	Graduate	D	6' 2" (1.88 m)	206 lb (93 kg)	1998-12-10	Lakeville, Minnesota	Michigan (Big Ten)	—
21	(United States)	Ben Strinden	Sophomore	F	6' 1" (1.85 m)	201 lb (91 kg)	2002-06-04	Fargo, North Dakota	Muskegon (USHL)	NSH, 210th overall 2022
22	(United States)	Owen McLaughlin	Sophomore	F	6' 0" (1.83 m)	172 lb (78 kg)	2003-03-25	Spring City, Pennsylvania	Sioux City (USHL)	—
24	(United States)	Michael Emerson	Freshman	F	6' 1" (1.85 m)	190 lb (86 kg)	2003-11-26	Yorktown Heights, New York	Chicago (USHL)	CAR, 190th overall 2023
25	(Canada)	Abram Wiebe	Freshman	D	6' 2" (1.88 m)	200 lb (91 kg)	2003-08-28	Mission, British Columbia	Chilliwack (BCHL)	VGK, 209th overall 2022
26	(Canada)	Dylan James	Sophomore	F	6' 0" (1.83 m)	178 lb (81 kg)	2003-10-12	Calgary, Alberta	Sioux City (USHL)	DET, 40th overall 2022
27	(Canada)	Louis Jamernik V (A)	Senior	F	5' 11" (1.8 m)	203 lb (92 kg)	2000-02-22	Calgary, Alberta	Okotoks (AJHL)	—
28	(United States)	Hunter Johannes	Graduate	F	6' 3" (1.91 m)	217 lb (98 kg)	1998-07-24	Eden Prairie, Minnesota	Lindenwood (NCAA)	—
29	(United States)	Jackson Kunz	Junior	F	6' 3" (1.91 m)	224 lb (102 kg)	2002-08-13	Grand Forks, North Dakota	Green Bay (USHL)	VAN, 113th overall 2020
30	(United States)	Hobie Hedquist	Freshman	G	6' 2" (1.88 m)	191 lb (87 kg)	2003-02-14	Heron Lake, Minnesota	Alberni Valley (BCHL)	—
32	(Sweden)	Ludvig Persson	Senior	G	6' 0" (1.83 m)	181 lb (82 kg)	1999-10-06	Hindas, Sweden	Miami (NCHC)	—

1.Michael Emerson departed the team on January 11, 2024 to return to the Chicago Steel before transferring to Merrimack in the offseason.

== Standings ==
2023–24 National Collegiate Hockey Conference Standings
	Conference record										Overall record					
	GP	W	L	T	OTW	OTL	SW	PTS	GF	GA	GP	W	L	T	GF	GA
#8 North Dakota †	24	15	8	1	1	4	0	49	87	67	40	26	12	2	151	105
#1 Denver *	24	15	7	2	3	0	1	45	110	80	44	32	9	3	202	120
#18 St. Cloud State	24	11	9	4	1	3	2	41	77	74	38	17	16	5	121	114
#15 Colorado College	24	14	8	2	5	2	0	41	66	56	37	21	13	3	111	93
#12 Omaha	24	13	8	3	5	0	3	40	68	74	40	23	13	4	117	112
#14 Western Michigan	24	11	13	0	1	5	0	35	78	64	38	21	16	1	136	97
Minnesota Duluth	24	8	14	2	3	3	2	28	65	80	37	12	20	5	103	125
Miami	24	1	21	2	0	2	0	7	44	100	36	7	26	3	78	135
Championship: March 23, 2024 † indicates conference regular season champion (Penrose Cup) * indicates conference tournament champion (Frozen Faceoff Championship Trophy); Rankings: USCHO.com Top 20 Poll; Updated: April 1, 2024

== Schedule and results ==
Date	Time	Opponent^{#}	Rank^{#}	Site	TV	Decision	Result	Attendance	Record
Exhibition
October 7	6:07 pm	Manitoba*	#7	Ralph Engelstad Arena • Grand Forks, North Dakota (Exhibition)	Midco	Persson	W 10–0	11,692	—
Ice Breaker Tournament
October 13	7:07 pm	Army*	#7	Ralph Engelstad Arena • Grand Forks, North Dakota (Ice Breaker Game 1)	Midco	Persson	W 7–2	11,548	1–0–0
October 14	6:07 pm	Wisconsin*	#7	Ralph Engelstad Arena • Grand Forks, North Dakota (Ice Breaker Game 2)	Midco	Persson	W 2–0	11,783	2–0–0
Regular Season
October 20	7:07 pm	#1 Minnesota*	#5	Ralph Engelstad Arena • Grand Forks, North Dakota (Rivalry)	Fox 9, Midco	Persson	L 0–4	11,616	2–1–0
October 21	6:07 pm	#1 Minnesota*	#5	Ralph Engelstad Arena • Grand Forks, North Dakota (Rivalry)	Fox 9+, Midco	Persson	W 2–1	11,636	3–1–0
October 27	7:07 pm	Minnesota State*	#4	Ralph Engelstad Arena • Grand Forks, North Dakota	Midco	Persson	W 6–2	11,604	4–1–0
October 28	6:07 pm	Minnesota State*	#4	Ralph Engelstad Arena • Grand Forks, North Dakota	Midco	Persson	T 2–2 ^{OT}	11,646	4–1–1
November 3	6:00 pm	at #9 Boston University*	#3	Agganis Arena • Boston, Massachusetts	ESPN+	Persson	L 2–3	4,390	4–2–1
November 4	6:00 pm	at #9 Boston University*	#3	Agganis Arena • Boston, Massachusetts	ESPN+	Persson	W 5–4 ^{OT}	4,968	5–2–1
November 10	7:07 pm	at #18 Minnesota Duluth	#4	AMSOIL Arena • Duluth, Minnesota		Persson	W 4–2	6,437	6–2–1 (1–0–0)
November 11	6:07 pm	at #18 Minnesota Duluth	#4	AMSOIL Arena • Duluth, Minnesota		Persson	W 2–0	6,833	7–2–1 (2–0–0)
November 17	7:07 pm	Miami	#2	Ralph Engelstad Arena • Grand Forks, North Dakota	Midco	Persson	W 6–4	11,589	8–2–1 (3–0–0)
November 18	6:07 pm	Miami	#2	Ralph Engelstad Arena • Grand Forks, North Dakota	Midco	Persson	W 5–1	11,657	9–2–1 (4–0–0)
November 24	7:07 pm	Bemidji State*	#1	Ralph Engelstad Arena • Grand Forks, North Dakota	Midco	Persson	W 3–2 ^{OT}	11,631	10–2–1
November 25	6:07 pm	Bemidji State*	#1	Ralph Engelstad Arena • Grand Forks, North Dakota	Midco	Persson	W 5–0	11,690	11–2–1
December 1	8:00 pm	at #3 Denver	#2	Magness Arena • Denver, Colorado (Rivalry)		Persson	W 7–5	5,958	12–2–1 (5–0–0)
December 2	7:00 pm	at #3 Denver	#2	Magness Arena • Denver, Colorado (Rivalry)		Persson	L 2–3 ^{OT}	6,136	12–3–1 (5–1–0)
December 8	7:07 pm	Colorado College	#1	Ralph Engelstad Arena • Grand Forks, North Dakota	Midco, SOCO CW	Persson	L 2–3 ^{OT}	11,569	12–4–1 (5–2–0)
December 9	6:07 pm	Colorado College	#1	Ralph Engelstad Arena • Grand Forks, North Dakota	Midco	Persson	L 2–3 ^{OT}	11,673	12–5–1 (5–3–0)
Exhibition
December 30	6:07 pm	USNTDP*	#4	Ralph Engelstad Arena • Grand Forks, North Dakota (Exhibition)	Midco	Hedquist	L 3–4 ^{OT}	11,569	—
Regular Season
January 5	7:07 pm	Alaska*	#4	Ralph Engelstad Arena • Grand Forks, North Dakota	Midco	Hedquist	W 6–4	11,190	13–5–1
January 6	6:07 pm	Alaska*	#4	Ralph Engelstad Arena • Grand Forks, North Dakota	Midco	Hedquist	W 6–2	11,656	14–5–1
January 12	7:07 pm	Omaha	#4	Ralph Engelstad Arena • Grand Forks, North Dakota	Midco	Persson	L 4–5 ^{OT}	11,394	14–6–1 (5–4–0)
January 13	6:07 pm	Omaha	#4	Ralph Engelstad Arena • Grand Forks, North Dakota	Midco	Hedquist	W 3–1	11,622	15–6–1 (6–4–0)
January 19	7:30 pm	at #13 St. Cloud State	#6	Herb Brooks National Hockey Center • St. Cloud, Minnesota	Fox 9+	Persson	W 5–3	4,568	16–6–1 (7–4–0)
January 20	6:00 pm	at #13 St. Cloud State	#6	Herb Brooks National Hockey Center • St. Cloud, Minnesota	Fox 9+	Persson	T 3–3 ^{SOL}	5,568	16–6–2 (7–4–1)
January 26	7:07 pm	#4 Denver	#5	Ralph Engelstad Arena • Grand Forks, North Dakota (Rivalry)	CBSSN	Persson	W 5–2	11,610	17–6–2 (8–4–1)
January 27	7:07 pm	#4 Denver	#5	Ralph Engelstad Arena • Grand Forks, North Dakota (Rivalry)	Midco	Persson	W 4–2	11,702	18–6–2 (9–4–1)
February 2	6:05 pm	at Miami	#2	Steve Cady Arena • Oxford, Ohio		Persson	W 5–4 ^{OT}	2,717	19–6–2 (10–4–1)
February 3	6:05 pm	at Miami	#2	Steve Cady Arena • Oxford, Ohio		Persson	W 4–1	3,101	20–6–2 (11–4–1)
February 16	8:00 pm	at #15 Colorado College	#2	Ed Robson Arena • Colorado Springs, Colorado	SOCO CW	Persson	L 1–7	3,503	20–7–2 (11–5–1)
February 17	7:00 pm	at #15 Colorado College	#2	Ed Robson Arena • Colorado Springs, Colorado		Persson	L 2–6	3,585	20–8–2 (11–6–1)
February 23	7:07 pm	Minnesota Duluth	#4т	Ralph Engelstad Arena • Grand Forks, North Dakota	Midco	Persson	W 6–0	11,670	21–8–2 (12–6–1)
February 24	6:07 pm	Minnesota Duluth	#4т	Ralph Engelstad Arena • Grand Forks, North Dakota	Midco	Persson	W 4–2	11,693	22–8–2 (13–6–1)
March 1	7:07 pm	#12 Western Michigan	#3	Ralph Engelstad Arena • Grand Forks, North Dakota	Midco, CBSSN	Persson	W 5–3	11,833	23–8–2 (14–6–1)
March 2	6:07 pm	#12 Western Michigan	#3	Ralph Engelstad Arena • Grand Forks, North Dakota	Midco 2	Persson	W 3–0	11,776	24–8–2 (15–6–1)
March 8	7:07 pm	at #16 Omaha	#3	Baxter Arena • Omaha, Nebraska		Persson	L 2–3	7,802	24–9–2 (15–7–1)
March 9	6:07 pm	at #16 Omaha	#3	Baxter Arena • Omaha, Nebraska		Persson	L 1–4	7,802	24–10–2 (15–8–1)
NCHC Tournament
March 15	7:07 pm	Miami*	#5	Ralph Engelstad Arena • Grand Forks, North Dakota (Quarterfinal Game 1)	Midco	Hedquist	W 5–1	11,320	25–10–2
March 16	6:07 pm	Miami*	#5	Ralph Engelstad Arena • Grand Forks, North Dakota (Quarterfinal Game 2)	Midco	Hedquist	W 7–1	11,569	26–10–2
March 22	4:07 pm	vs. #11 Omaha*	#4	Xcel Energy Center • Saint Paul, Minnesota (Semifinal)	CBSSN	Hedquist	L 3–6	8,977	26–11–2
NCAA Tournament
March 29	7:30 pm	vs. #10 Michigan*	#5	Centene Community Ice Center • Maryland Heights, Missouri (Midwest Regional Semifinal)	ESPNU	Persson	L 3–4	3,148	26–12–2
*Non-conference game. ^{#}Rankings from USCHO.com Poll. All times are in Central Time. Source:

== NCAA tournament ==
=== Regional semifinal ===
March 29, 2024; 7:30 pm	(2) North Dakota	3–4 (1–0, 1–1, 1–3)	(3) Michigan	Centene Community Ice Center; Attendance: 3,148

Game reference

Ludvig Persson
Goalies
Jake Barczewski
Referees:
Ryan Sweeney
Brendan Blanchard
Linesmen:
Brendan Lewis
Joe Sherman

(Wiebe) Hunter Johannes (12) – 4:46	1–0
	1–1	21:37 – Frank Nazar (17) (Holtz, Estapa)
(Pehrson, McLaughlin) Jackson Blake (22) – 28:18	2–1
	2–2	40:50 – Dylan Duke (23) (Fantilli)
	2–3	42:23 – T. J. Hughes (19) (Schifsky, T. Duke)
	2–4	51:56 – GW – Dylan Duke (24) (Hughes, Schifsky)
(Pehrson) Jackson Kunz (9) – 54:31	3–4

2 min
Penalties
2 min
27
Shots
30

== Scoring statistics ==
Name	Position	Games	Goals	Assists	Points	PIM
Jackson Blake	RW/C	40	22	38	60	26
Owen McLaughlin	C	39	13	26	39	8
Cameron Berg	C	40	20	17	37	8
Riese Gaber	RW	40	18	16	34	34
Jake Livanavage	D	40	5	24	29	6
Garrett Pyke	D	39	3	22	25	14
Hunter Johannes	LW	31	12	7	19	29
Jackson Kunz	C	37	9	10	19	4
Dylan James	LW	40	9	10	19	12
Jayden Perron	RW	39	11	7	18	8
Louis Jamernik	RW	40	8	9	17	18
Logan Britt	D	40	7	7	14	10
Ben Strinden	C	39	6	6	12	18
Jake Schmaltz	C/LW	36	1	10	11	13
Abram Wiebe	D	40	1	9	10	27
Keaton Pehrson	D	35	0	8	8	10
Bennett Zmolek	D	33	0	8	8	22
Griffin Ness	F	30	3	3	6	16
Carson Albrecht	RW	26	2	1	3	8
Ludvig Persson	G	34	0	3	3	0
Dane Montgomery	RW	16	1	1	2	0
Nate Benoit	D	19	0	1	1	4
Kaleb Johnson	G	1	0	0	0	0
Tanner Komzak	D	4	0	0	0	0
Michael Emerson	RW	6	0	0	0	2
Hobie Hedquist	G	7	0	0	0	0
Total			151	243	394	303

== Goaltending statistics ==
Name	Games	Minutes	Wins	Losses	Ties	Goals against	Saves	Shut outs	SV %	GAA
Ludvig Persson	34	2022:27	21	11	2	85	803	5	.904	2.52
Hobie Hedquist	7	382:14	5	1	0	16	153	0	.905	2.51
Empty Net	-	14:02	-	-	-	4	-	-	-	-
Total	40	2418:43	26	12	2	105	956	5	.901	2.60

== Rankings ==
Poll	Week																										
Poll	Pre	1	2	3	4	5	6	7	8	9	10	11	12	13	14	15	16	17	18	19	20	21	22	23	24	25	26 (Final)
USCHO.com	7	7	5	4	3 (1)	4	2 (9)	1 (33)	2 (31)	1 (33)	4	–	4	4	6	5 (1)	2 (2)	2 (2)	2 (14)	4т	3	3	5	4	5	–	8
USA Hockey	8	7	5	4	4	4	4	1т (15)	2 (16)	1 (23)	4	4	–	4	7	5	2	2	2 (10)	5	3	3	5	4	5	8	8

Note: USCHO did not release a poll in weeks 11 or 25.
Note: USA Hockey did not release a poll in week 12.

== Awards and honors ==
Player	Award	Ref
Jackson Blake	AHCA West First Team All-American	
Jackson Blake	NCHC Player of the Year	
Jackson Blake	NCHC Preseason All-Conference Team	
Riese Gaber	NCHC Preseason All-Conference Team	
Jackson Blake	NCHC Forward of the Year	
Jackson Blake	NCHC First Team	
Ludvig Persson	NCHC Second Team	
Jake Livanavage	NCHC Third Team	
Garrett Pyke	NCHC Third Team	
Cameron Berg	NCHC Third Team	
Riese Gaber	NCHC Third Team	
Jake Livanavage	NCHC Rookie Team	

== 2024 NHL entry draft ==
Round	Pick	Player	NHL team
1	18	Sacha Boisvert ^{†}	Chicago Blackhawks
1	30	E. J. Emery ^{†}	New York Rangers
3	76	William Zellers ^{†}	Colorado Avalanche
7	207	Mac Swanson ^{†}	Pittsburgh Penguins

† incoming freshman
