= Snuggerud =

Disambiguation page

Snuggerud is a surname. Notable people with the surname include:

- Dave Snuggerud (born 1966), American ice hockey player
- Luc Snuggerud (born 1995), American ice hockey player
- Jimmy Snuggerud (born 2004), American ice hockey player
