= List of All-NCHC Teams =

The All-NCHC Teams are composed of players at all positions from teams that are members of the National Collegiate Hockey Conference, an NCAA Division I hockey-only conference. Each year, beginning in 2013–14, at the conclusion of the NCHC regular season the head coaches and one student-athlete from each member team vote for players to be placed on each all-conference team. An honorable mention team was introduced in the 2014-15 season. The all-NCHC teams are a successor to the All-CCHA Teams which were discontinued after the conference dissolved due to the 2013–14 NCAA conference realignment.

The all-conference teams are composed of one goaltender, two defensemen and three forwards. Players may only appear once per year on any of the first or second teams but freshman may appear on both the rookie team and one of the other all-conference teams.

== All-conference teams ==
=== First Team ===
==== 2010s ====
2013–14
Player	Pos	Team
Sam Brittain	G	Denver
Dillon Simpson	D	North Dakota
Joey LaLeggia	D	Denver
Josh Archibald	F	Omaha
Nic Dowd	F	St. Cloud State
Austin Czarnik	F	Miami

2014–15
Player	Pos	Team
Zane McIntyre	G	North Dakota
Joey LaLeggia	D	Denver
Jaccob Slavin	D	Colorado College
Trevor Moore	F	Denver
Jonny Brodzinski	F	St. Cloud State
Mark MacMillan	F	North Dakota

2015–16
Player	Pos	Team
Charlie Lindgren	G	St. Cloud State
Ethan Prow	D	St. Cloud State
Will Butcher	D	Denver
Danton Heinen	F	Denver
Brock Boeser	F	North Dakota
Drake Caggiula	F	North Dakota

2016–17
Player	Pos	Team
Tanner Jaillet	G	Denver
Tucker Poolman	D	North Dakota
Will Butcher	D	Denver
Alex Iafallo	F	Minnesota–Duluth
Anthony Louis	F	Miami
Austin Ortega	F	Omaha

2017–18
Player	Pos	Team
Tanner Jaillet	G	Denver
Jimmy Schuldt	D	St. Cloud State
Scott Perunovich	D	Minnesota–Duluth
Henrik Borgström	F	Denver
Nick Halloran	F	Colorado College
David Pope	F	Omaha

2018–19
Player	Pos	Team
Hunter Shepard	G	Minnesota–Duluth
Jimmy Schuldt	D	St. Cloud State
Scott Perunovich	D	Minnesota–Duluth
Patrick Newell	F	St. Cloud State
Ryan Poehling	F	St. Cloud State
Blake Lizotte	F	St. Cloud State

==== 2020s ====
2019–20
Player	Pos	Team
Hunter Shepard	G	Minnesota Duluth
Scott Perunovich	D	Minnesota Duluth
Ian Mitchell	D	Denver
Jordan Kawaguchi	F	North Dakota
Noah Cates	F	Minnesota Duluth
Cole Koepke	F	Minnesota Duluth
Hugh McGing	F	Western Michigan

2020–21
Player	Pos	Team
Adam Scheel	G	North Dakota
Matt Kiersted	D	North Dakota
Ronnie Attard	D	Western Michigan
Shane Pinto	F	North Dakota
Jordan Kawaguchi	F	North Dakota
Nick Swaney	F	Minnesota Duluth

2021–22
Player	Pos	Team
Ryan Fanti	G	Minnesota Duluth
Ronnie Attard	D	Western Michigan
Nick Perbix	D	St. Cloud State
Bobby Brink	F	Denver
Ethen Frank	F	Western Michigan
Riese Gaber	F	North Dakota

2022–23
Player	Pos	Team
Magnus Chrona	G	Denver
Mike Benning	D	Denver
Chris Jandric	D	North Dakota
Jason Polin	F	Western Michigan
Massimo Rizzo	F	Denver
Jami Krannila	F	St. Cloud State

2023–24
Player	Pos	Team
Kaidan Mbereko	G	Colorado College
Zeev Buium	D	Denver
Dylan Anhorn	D	St. Cloud State
Jackson Blake	F	North Dakota
Noah Laba	F	Colorado College
Jack Devine	F	Denver

2024–25
Player	Pos	Team
Simon Latkoczy	G	Omaha
Zeev Buium	D	Denver
Jake Livanavage	D	North Dakota
Alex Bump	F	Western Michigan
Jack Devine	F	Denver
Artem Shlaine	F	Arizona State

2025–26
Player	Pos	Team
Jan Špunar	G	North Dakota
Eric Pohlkamp	D	Denver
Jake Livanavage	D	North Dakota
Max Plante	F	Minnesota Duluth
Tyson Gross	F	St. Cloud State
Cruz Lucius	F	Arizona State

==== First Team players by school ====
School	Winners
Denver	20
North Dakota	17
St. Cloud State	13
Minnesota Duluth	11
Western Michigan	6
Colorado College	4
Omaha	4
Arizona State	2
Miami	2

==== Multiple appearances ====
Player	First Team appearances
Scott Perunovich	3
Ronnie Attard	2
Zeev Buium	2
Will Butcher	2
Jack Devine	2
Tanner Jaillet	2
Jake Livanavage	2
Jordan Kawaguchi	2
Joey LaLeggia	2
Hunter Shepard	2

=== Second Team ===
==== 2010s ====
2013–14
Player	Pos	Team
Ryan Faragher	G	St. Cloud State
Jaccob Slavin	D	Colorado College
Jordan Schmaltz	D	North Dakota
Chase Balisy	F	Western Michigan
Riley Barber	F	Miami
Michael Parks	F	North Dakota

2014–15
Player	Pos	Team
Ryan Massa	G	Omaha
Andy Welinski	D	Minnesota–Duluth
Jordan Schmaltz	D	North Dakota
Danton Heinen	F	Denver
Austin Czarnik	F	Miami
Drake Caggiula	F	North Dakota

2015–16
Player	Pos	Team
Cam Johnson	G	North Dakota
Troy Stecher	D	North Dakota
Andy Welinski	D	Minnesota–Duluth
Joey Benik	F	St. Cloud State
Jake Guentzel	F	Omaha
Kalle Kossila	F	St. Cloud State

2016–17
Player	Pos	Team
Hunter Miska	G	Minnesota–Duluth
Neal Pionk	D	Minnesota–Duluth
Luc Snuggerud	D	Omaha
Henrik Borgström	F	Denver
Dylan Gambrell	F	Denver
Sheldon Dries	F	Western Michigan

2017–18
Player	Pos	Team
Hunter Shepard	G	Minnesota–Duluth
Christian Wolanin	D	North Dakota
Louie Belpedio	D	Miami
Mikey Eyssimont	F	St. Cloud State
Troy Terry	F	Denver
Dylan Gambrell	F	Denver

2018–19
Player	Pos	Team
Dávid Hrenák	G	St. Cloud State
Ian Mitchell	D	Denver
Jack Ahcan	D	St. Cloud State
Hugh McGing	F	Western Michigan
Justin Richards	F	Minnesota–Duluth
Mason Morelli	F	Omaha

==== 2020s ====
2019–20
Player	Pos	Team
Dávid Hrenák	G	St. Cloud State
Matt Kiersted	D	North Dakota
Jack Ahcan	D	St. Cloud State
Emilio Pettersen	F	Denver
Gordie Green	F	Miami

2020–21
Player	Pos	Team
Ludvig Persson	G	Miami
Nick Perbix	D	St. Cloud State
Jacob Bernard-Docker	D	North Dakota
Veeti Miettinen	F	St. Cloud State
Chayse Primeau	F	Omaha
Noah Cates	F	Minnesota Duluth

2021–22
Player	Pos	Team
Zach Driscoll	G	North Dakota
Jake Sanderson	D	North Dakota
Mike Benning	D	Denver
Carter Savoie	F	Denver
Drew Worrad	F	Western Michigan
Kevin Fitzgerald	F	St. Cloud State

2022–23
Player	Pos	Team
Kaidan Mbereko	G	Colorado College
Jack Peart	D	St. Cloud State
Wyatt Kaiser	D	Minnesota Duluth
Carter Mazur	F	Denver
Jackson Blake	F	North Dakota
Riese Gaber	F	North Dakota

2023–24
Player	Pos	Team
Ludvig Persson	G	North Dakota
Shai Buium	D	Denver
Jack Peart	D	St. Cloud State
Massimo Rizzo	F	Denver
Luke Grainger	F	Western Michigan
Ben Steeves	F	Minnesota Duluth

2024–25
Player	Pos	Team
Hampton Slukynsky	G	Western Michigan
Noah Beck	D	Arizona State
Max Burkholder	D	Colorado College
Lukas Sillinger	F	Arizona State
Luke Grainger	F	Western Michigan
Sam Stange	F	Omaha
Aidan Thompson	F	Denver

2025–26
Player	Pos	Team
Hampton Slukynsky	G	Western Michigan
Abram Wiebe	D	North Dakota
Ty Hanson	D	Minnesota Duluth
Bennett Schimek	F	Arizona State
Ben Strinden	F	North Dakota
Austin Burnevik	F	St. Cloud State

==== Second Team players by school ====
School	Winners
North Dakota	16
St. Cloud State	14
Denver	13
Minnesota Duluth	10
Western Michigan	7
Omaha	6
Miami	5
Colorado College	3
Arizona State	2

==== Multiple appearances ====
Player	Second Team appearances
Jack Ahcan	2
Dylan Gambrell	2
Dávid Hrenák	2
Jack Peart	2
Ludvig Persson	2
Jordan Schmaltz	2
Hampton Slukynsky	2
Andy Welinski	2

=== Third Team ===
==== 2020s ====
2024–25
Player	Pos	Team
Cameron Rowe	G	Western Michigan
Eric Pohlkamp	D	Denver
Joona Väisänen	D	Western Michigan
Sam Harris	F	Denver
Carter King	F	Denver
Ryan Kirwan	F	Arizona State

2025–26
Player	Pos	Team
Matteo Drobac	G	Miami
Boston Buckberger	D	Denver
Samuel Sjolund	D	Western Michigan
Zam Plante	F	Minnesota Duluth
Grant Slukynsky	F	Western Michigan
Ellis Rickwood	F	North Dakota

==== Third Team players by school ====
School	Winners
Denver	4
Western Michigan	4
Arizona State	1
Miami	1
Minnesota Duluth	1
North Dakota	1

=== Honorable Mention ===
==== 2010s ====
2014–15
Player	Pos	Team
Charlie Lindgren	G	St. Cloud State
Matt Caito	D	Miami
Andrew Prochno	D	St. Cloud State
Dominic Toninato	F	Minnesota–Duluth
Jake Guentzel	F	Omaha
Austin Ortega	F	Omaha

2015–16
Player	Pos	Team
Kasimir Kaskisuo	G	Minnesota–Duluth
Louie Belpedio	D	Miami
Paul LaDue	D	North Dakota
Sean Kuraly	F	Miami
Nick Schmaltz	F	North Dakota
Trevor Moore	F	Denver

2016–17
Player	Pos	Team
Ben Blacker	G	Western Michigan
Louie Belpedio	D	Miami
Jimmy Schuldt	D	St. Cloud State
Michael Eyssimont	F	St. Cloud State
Shane Gersich	F	North Dakota
Troy Terry	F	Denver

2017–18
Player	Pos	Team
Dávid Hrenák	G	St. Cloud State
Will Borgen	D	St. Cloud State
Colton Poolman	D	North Dakota
Dawson DiPietro	F	Western Michigan
Robby Jackson	F	St. Cloud State
Wade Allison	F	Western Michigan
Mason Bergh	F	Colorado College

2018–19
Player	Pos	Team
Filip Larsson	G	Denver
Alex Leclerc	G	Colorado College
Mikey Anderson	D	Minnesota–Duluth
Colton Poolman	D	North Dakota
Trey Bradley	F	Colorado College
Nick Swaney	F	Minnesota–Duluth

==== 2020s ====
2019–20
Player	Pos	Team
Adam Scheel	G	North Dakota
Colton Poolman	D	North Dakota
Mattius Samuelsson	D	Western Michigan
Nick Poehling	F	St. Cloud State
Westin Michaud	F	North Dakota
Taylor Ward	F	Omaha
Chris Wilkie	F	Colorado College

2020–21
Player	Pos	Team
Isaiah Saville	G	Omaha
Wyatt Kaiser	D	Minnesota Duluth
Brandon Scanlin	D	Omaha
Grant Cruikshank	F	St. Cloud State
Ethen Frank	F	Western Michigan
Collin Adams	F	North Dakota
Cole Koepke	F	Minnesota Duluth

2021–22
Player	Pos	Team
Magnus Chrona	G	Denver
Brandon Scanlin	D	Omaha
Michael Joyaux	D	Western Michigan
Cole Guttman	F	Denver
Noah Cates	F	Minnesota Duluth
Connor Ford	F	North Dakota

2022–23
Player	Pos	Team
Simon Latkoczy	G	Omaha
Dylan Anhorn	D	St. Cloud State
Sean Behrens	D	Denver
Ryan McAllister	F	Western Michigan
Hunter McKown	F	Colorado College
Jack Randl	F	Omaha
Ben Steeves	F	Minnesota Duluth
Zach Okabe	F	St. Cloud State

2023–24
Player	Pos	Team
Simon Latkoczy	G	Omaha
Sean Behrens	D	Denver
Jake Livanavage	D	North Dakota
Garrett Pyke	D	North Dakota
Cameron Berg	F	North Dakota
Sam Colangelo	F	Western Michigan
Riese Gaber	F	North Dakota

==== Honorable Mention players by school ====
School	Winners
North Dakota	14
St. Cloud State	11
Omaha	9
Minnesota Duluth	8
Western Michigan	8
Denver	7
Colorado College	5
Miami	4

==== Multiple appearances ====
Player	Honorable Mention appearances
Colton Poolman	3
Sean Behrens	2
Louie Belpedio	2
Simon Latkoczy	2
Brandon Scanlin	2

=== Rookie Team ===
==== 2010s ====
2013–14
Player	Pos	Team
Charlie Lindgren	G	St. Cloud State
Jaccob Slavin	D	Colorado College
Paul LaDue	D	North Dakota
Jake Guentzel	F	Omaha
Alex Iafallo	F	Minnesota–Duluth
Trevor Moore	F	Denver

2014–15
Player	Pos	Team
Kasmir Kasisuo	G	Minnesota–Duluth
Louis Belpedio	D	Miami
Luc Snuggerud	D	Omaha
Danton Heinen	F	Denver
Patrick Russell	F	St. Cloud State
Nick Schmaltz	F	North Dakota

2015–16
Player	Pos	Team
Evan Weninger	G	Omaha
Jimmy Schuldt	D	St. Cloud State
Will Borgen	D	St. Cloud State
Brock Boeser	F	North Dakota
Dylan Gambrell	F	Denver
Jack Roslovic	F	Miami

2016–17
Player	Pos	Team
Ben Blacker	G	Western Michigan
Jack Ahcan	D	St. Cloud State
Michael Davies	D	Denver
Henrik Borgström	F	Denver
Tyson Jost	F	North Dakota
Joey Anderson	F	Minnesota–Duluth

2017–18
Player	Pos	Team
Dávid Hrenák	G	St. Cloud State
Ian Mitchell	D	Denver
Scott Perunovich	D	Minnesota–Duluth
Blake Lizotte	F	St. Cloud State
Grant Mismash	F	North Dakota
Easton Brodzinski	F	St. Cloud State

2018–19
Player	Pos	Team
Filip Larsson	G	Denver
Adam Scheel	G	North Dakota
Nick Perbix	D	St. Cloud State
Bryan Yoon	D	Colorado College
Nolan Walker	F	St. Cloud State
Taylor Ward	F	Omaha
Noah Cates	F	Minnesota–Duluth

==== 2020s ====
2019–20
Player	Pos	Team
Magnus Chrona	G	Denver
Ronnie Attard	D	Western Michigan
Brandon Scanlin	D	Omaha
Bobby Brink	F	Denver
Shane Pinto	F	North Dakota
Joey Abate	F	Omaha

2020–21
Player	Pos	Team
Ludvig Persson	G	Miami
Jake Sanderson	D	North Dakota
Wyatt Kaiser	D	Minnesota Duluth
Veeti Miettinen	F	St. Cloud State
Carter Savoie	F	Omaha
Riese Gaber	F	North Dakota

2021–22
Player	Pos	Team
Jakob Hellsten	G	North Dakota
Sean Behrens	D	Denver
Shai Buium	D	Denver
Carter Mazur	F	Denver
Massimo Rizzo	F	Denver
Matteo Costantini	F	North Dakota

2022–23
Player	Pos	Team
Kaidan Mbereko	G	Colorado College
Joaquim Lemay	D	Omaha
Jacob Guevin	D	Omaha
Jackson Blake	F	North Dakota
Ryan McAllister	F	Western Michigan
Ben Steeves	F	Minnesota Duluth

2023–24
Player	Pos	Team
Isak Posch	G	St. Cloud State
Zeev Buium	D	Denver
Jake Livanavage	D	North Dakota
Miko Matikka	F	Denver
Alex Bump	F	Western Michigan
Tanner Ludtke	F	Omaha

2024–25
Player	Pos	Team
Hampton Slukynsky	G	Western Michigan
Joona Väisänen	D	Western Michigan
Colin Ralph	D	St. Cloud State
Sacha Boisvert	F	North Dakota
Austin Burnevik	F	St. Cloud State
Max Plante	F	Minnesota Duluth
Cullen Potter	F	Arizona State

2025–26
Player	Pos	Team
Jan Špunar	G	North Dakota
Keaton Verhoeff	D	North Dakota
Eric Jamieson	D	Denver
Cole Reschny	F	North Dakota
Will Zellers	F	North Dakota
David Deputy	F	Miami

==== Rookie Team players by school ====
School	Winners
North Dakota	18
Denver	16
St. Cloud State	14
Omaha	10
Minnesota Duluth	8
Western Michigan	6
Miami	4
Colorado College	3
Arizona State	1

== See also ==
- NCHC Awards
- All-CCHA Teams
- All-WCHA Teams
