= Matt Kiersted =

American ice hockey player (born 1998)

- Kiersted with the Charlotte Checkers in 2024
- Born: April 14, 1998 (age 28) Elk River, Minnesota, U.S.
- Height: 6 ft 0 in (183 cm)
- Weight: 181 lb (82 kg; 12 st 13 lb)
- Position: Defense
- Shoots: Left
- NHL team Former teams: Minnesota Wild; Florida Panthers
- NHL draft: Undrafted
- Playing career: 2021–present

Matthew Kiersted (born April 14, 1998) is an American professional ice hockey player who is a defenseman for the Minnesota Wild of the National Hockey League (NHL).

== Early life ==
Kiersted was born on April 14, 1998, in Elk River, Minnesota, to parents Bob Kiersted and Candace Hartwig. He grew up as the middle child between brothers Mitch and Drew. His father was friends with former ice hockey player Mark Parrish, who convinced them to let their children play the sport. Kiersted graduated from Elk River High School in 2016.

== Playing career ==
=== Amateur ===
While attending Elk River High School, Kiersted committed to play collegiate ice hockey for the North Dakota Fighting Hawks men's ice hockey team. As a junior, he left Elk River to play for the Chicago Steel of the United States Hockey League (USHL).

=== Professional ===
As a free agent, Kiersted signed a two-year, entry-level contract with the Florida Panthers on April 1, 2021. He made his NHL debut two days later, in the Panthers' 5–2 win against the Columbus Blue Jackets. On June 28, 2024, Kiersted signed a one-year, two-way contract to return to the Panthers.

Following five seasons within the Panthers organization, Kiersted left as a free agent and signed to a two-year, two-way contract with homestate club, the Minnesota Wild, on July 2, 2025.

== Career statistics ==
			Regular season					Playoffs
Season	Team	League	GP	G	A	Pts	PIM	GP	G	A	Pts	PIM
2013–14	Elk River High	USHS	24	6	15	21	22	3	0	4	4	2
2014–15	Elk River High	USHS	25	8	28	36	31	3	1	4	5	2
2014–15	Chicago Steel	USHL	11	0	1	1	6	—	—	—	—	—
2015–16	Chicago Steel	USHL	57	4	19	23	44	—	—	—	—	—
2016–17	Chicago Steel	USHL	23	2	12	14	24	—	—	—	—	—
2017–18	University of North Dakota	NCHC	29	4	4	8	10	—	—	—	—	—
2018–19	University of North Dakota	NCHC	36	7	11	18	35	—	—	—	—	—
2019–20	University of North Dakota	NCHC	33	6	23	29	50	—	—	—	—	—
2020–21	University of North Dakota	NCHC	29	3	19	22	28	—	—	—	—	—
2020–21	Florida Panthers	NHL	7	0	0	0	2	—	—	—	—	—
2021–22	Florida Panthers	NHL	10	1	1	2	2	—	—	—	—	—
2021–22	Charlotte Checkers	AHL	63	5	15	20	64	7	1	0	1	4
2022–23	Florida Panthers	NHL	20	1	3	4	6	—	—	—	—	—
2022–23	Charlotte Checkers	AHL	49	6	15	21	44	7	0	3	3	16
2023–24	Charlotte Checkers	AHL	57	4	11	15	53	3	0	0	0	6
2024–25	Charlotte Checkers	AHL	64	1	28	29	40	13	0	8	8	12
2024–25	Florida Panthers	NHL	2	0	1	1	2	—	—	—	—	—
2025–26	Iowa Wild	AHL	49	4	8	12	38	—	—	—	—	—
2025–26	Minnesota Wild	NHL	6	0	1	1	0	—	—	—	—	—
NHL totals			45	2	6	8	12	—	—	—	—	—

== Awards and honors ==
Award	Year	Ref
USHL
Clark Cup champion	2017	
College
NCHC Second All-Star Team	2019–20	
NCHC First All-Star Team	2020–21	
AHCA West Second Team All-American	2020–21	
