= Jack Ahcan =

American ice hockey player (born 1997)

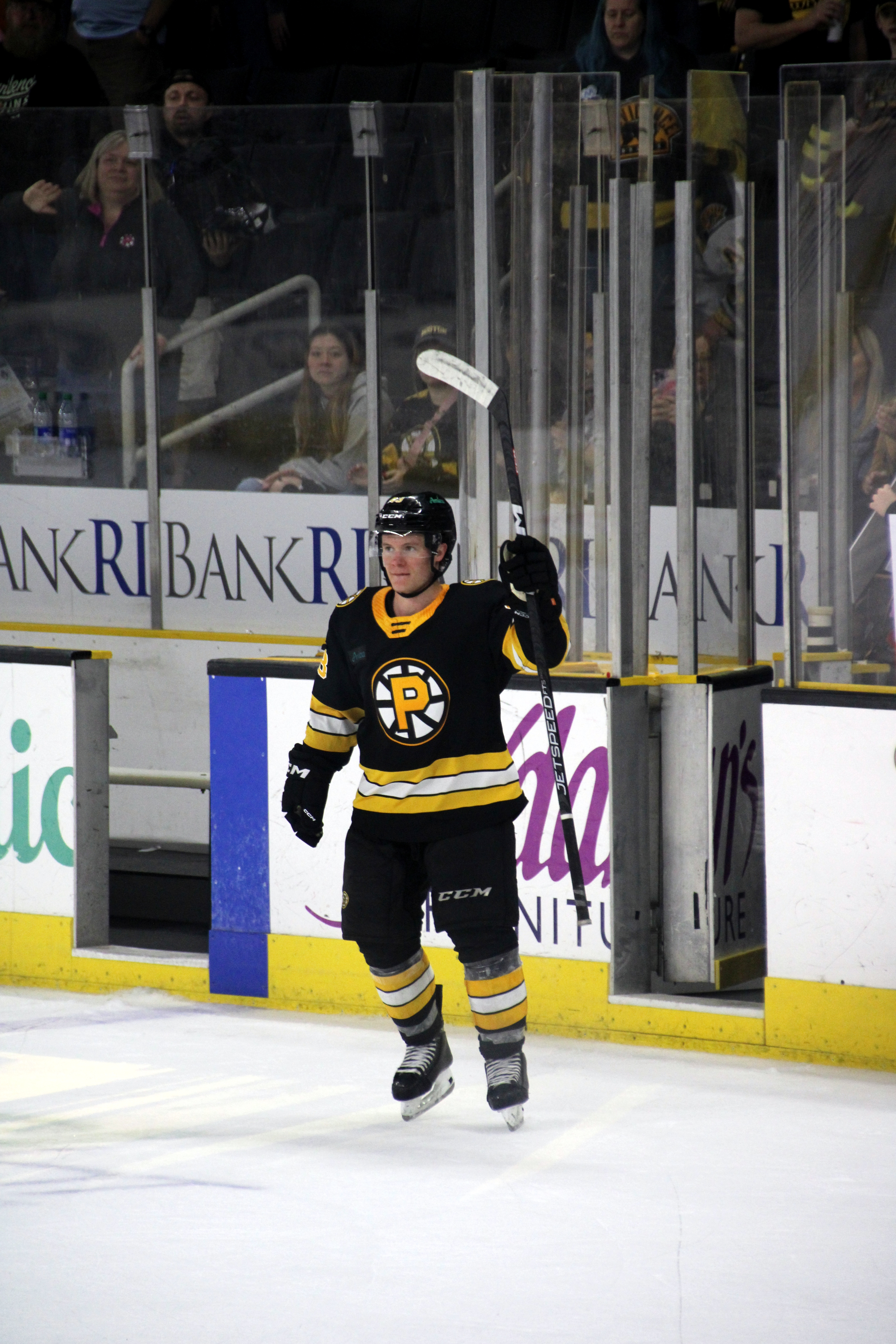
- Ahcan with the Providence Bruins in 2023
- Born: May 18, 1997 (age 29) Savage, Minnesota, U.S
- Height: 5 ft 9 in (175 cm)
- Weight: 180 lb (82 kg; 12 st 12 lb)
- Position: Defense
- Shoots: Left
- NHL team (P) Cur. team Former teams: Nashville Predators; Milwaukee Admirals (AHL); Boston Bruins; Colorado Avalanche
- NHL draft: Undrafted
- Playing career: 2020–present

Jack Anthony Ahcan (/əˈʃɔːn/ əh-SHAWN born May 18, 1997) is an American professional ice hockey defenseman currently playing for the Milwaukee Admirals in the American Hockey League (AHL) while under contract to the Nashville Predators of the National Hockey League (NHL).

== Early life ==
Ahcan was born on May 18, 1997, in Savage, Minnesota to parents Tim and Michelle Ahcan. Ahcan grew up in an athletic family as his father was an All-American forward at Gustavus Adolphus College and his younger brothers also play hockey. Ahcan played both baseball and hockey in Minnesota before choosing hockey full time following his junior year of high school. As a senior at Burnsville High School, Ahcan was a finalist for the Minnesota Mr. Hockey Award as the "most outstanding senior high school boys hockey player in the state of Minnesota." At the time of his nomination, he stood at 5-foot-7 and led Burnsville with 23 points in 21 games.

== Playing career ==
=== Junior ===
After graduating from Burnsville, Ahcan played one season in the United States Hockey League (USHL) for the Cedar Rapids RoughRiders. In his only season with the team, Ahcan recorded 15 goals and 32 assists and led all USHL defenders in goal scoring. As a result, he finished the 2015–16 season as the USHL Defenseman of the Year and was named to the USHL First All-Star Team.

=== Collegiate ===
Ahcan joined the St. Cloud State Huskies men's ice hockey team for their 2016–17 season. By the end of October, Ahcan was the recipient of the Bauer National Collegiate Hockey Conference (NCHC) Rookie of the Week after recording four points over two games, including the game-winning goal. He concluded the season leading Huskie freshmen with 21 points and was awarded both the Huskies' Roland Vandell Award as Rookie of the Year and named to the NCHC All-Rookie Team.

When Ahcan returned to the Huskies for his sophomore season, he increased his output and recorded 23 points in 40 games. Throughout the season he tallied 54 blocks on defense and had a season-high four blocks during a game against the Omaha Lancers. Growing on his sophomore season, Ahcan set a career-high in goals, assists, and points in 39 games. As a result of his play, he was named to the NCHC Second All-Star Team and West Second All-American Team.

In his final season with the Huskies, Ahcan served as team captain alongside alternate captains Clark Kuster, Jack Poehling, and Nick Poehling. When the season was cut short due to the COVID-19 pandemic, Ahcan signed a professional contract with the Boston Bruins of the National Hockey League (NHL) on March 26, 2020.

=== Professional ===
Ahcan joined the Providence Bruins of the American Hockey League (AHL) for their 2021 training camp and recorded his first professional point during a game against the Bridgeport Sound Tigers. Ahcan made his NHL debut on March 18, 2021, against the Buffalo Sabres. He scored his first NHL goal on March 10, 2022, against the Chicago Blackhawks.

Following three seasons within the Bruins organization, Ahcan left as a free agent and was signed to a two-year, two-way contract with the Colorado Avalanche on July 1, 2023.

After concluding his third season with the Avalanche, Ahcan as a free agent joined his third NHL club in signing a two-year, two-way contract with the Nashville Predators on July 1, 2026.

== Career statistics ==
=== Regular season and playoffs ===
			Regular season					Playoffs
Season	Team	League	GP	G	A	Pts	PIM	GP	G	A	Pts	PIM
2012–13	Burnsville High	USHS	25	1	10	11	12	3	0	1	1	0
2013–14	Burnsville High	USHS	24	6	21	27	14	2	1	2	3	0
2014–15	Burnsville High	USHS	24	8	24	32	13	3	2	2	4	0
2015–16	Cedar Rapids RoughRiders	USHL	56	14	30	44	50	5	1	2	3	4
2016–17	St. Cloud State	NCHC	32	5	16	21	25	—	—	—	—	—
2017–18	St. Cloud State	NCHC	40	3	20	23	12	—	—	—	—	—
2018–19	St. Cloud State	NCHC	39	6	28	34	38	—	—	—	—	—
2019–20	St. Cloud State	NCHC	33	7	18	25	48	—	—	—	—	—
2020–21	Jacksonville Icemen	ECHL	2	0	0	0	0	—	—	—	—	—
2020–21	Providence Bruins	AHL	19	1	9	10	6	—	—	—	—	—
2020–21	Boston Bruins	NHL	3	0	0	0	0	—	—	—	—	—
2021–22	Providence Bruins	AHL	46	6	17	23	10	2	0	0	0	4
2021–22	Boston Bruins	NHL	6	1	0	1	0	—	—	—	—	—
2022–23	Providence Bruins	AHL	68	5	31	36	24	4	1	1	2	2
2023–24	Colorado Eagles	AHL	70	6	32	38	51	3	0	0	0	0
2024–25	Colorado Eagles	AHL	69	5	36	41	20	2	0	1	1	4
2024–25	Colorado Avalanche	NHL	2	0	0	0	2	—	—	—	—	—
2025–26	Colorado Eagles	AHL	61	11	39	50	48	11	1	4	5	2
2025–26	Colorado Avalanche	NHL	11	0	2	2	2	3	0	0	0	0
NHL totals			22	1	2	3	4	3	0	0	0	0

Medal record

Representing United States

Ice hockey

World Junior Championships
Gold medal – first place	2017 Canada	

=== International ===
Year	Team	Event	Result	GP	G	A	Pts	PIM
2016	United States	WJAC	3rd place, bronze medalist(s)	5	0	0	0	2
2017	United States	WJC	1st place, gold medalist(s)	7	0	1	1	0
Junior totals				12	0	1	1	2

== Awards and honors ==
Award	Year
USHS
All-USA Hockey Third Team	2015
USHL
Defenseman of the Year	2016
First All-Star Team	2016
College
NCHC All-Rookie Team	2017
NCHC All-Tournament Team	2018
NCHC Second All-Star Team	2019, 2020
West Second All-American Team	2019
