= Hunter McKown =

American ice hockey player (born 2002)

- Born: August 18, 2002 (age 24) San Jose, California, U.S.
- Height: 6 ft 1 in (185 cm)
- Weight: 192 lb (87 kg; 13 st 10 lb)
- Position: Forward
- Shoots: Right
- NHL team (P) Cur. team Former teams: Montreal Canadiens; Laval Rocket (AHL); Columbus Blue Jackets
- NHL draft: Undrafted
- Playing career: 2023–present

Hunter McKown (born August 18, 2002) is an American professional ice hockey forward for the Laval Rocket of the American Hockey League (AHL) while under contract to the Montreal Canadiens of the National Hockey League (NHL). Originally undrafted by teams in the NHL, McKown has previously played for the Columbus Blue Jackets.

== Playing career ==
McKown played minor hockey with the San Jose Jr. Sharks before moving to play with the St. Louis AAA Blues of the T1EHL. In continuing his development, he joined the U.S. National Team Development Program and played in the United States Hockey League (USHL) ranks for two years beginning in 2018–19. Thereafter, McKown committed to play collegiate hockey with Colorado College in the National Collegiate Hockey Conference (NCHC).

Serving as an alternate captain for the Tigers in his junior season in 2022–23, McKown finished with a team leading 21 goals and 28 points. Using his size, he led the NCAA in power play goals (14) and was named as an All-NCHC Honorable Mention selection.

As an undrafted free agent, McKown concluded his collegiate career and was signed to a three-year, entry-level contract with the Columbus Blue Jackets and immediately joined their roster to close out the 2022–23 season on March 20, 2023. Four days later, he made his NHL debut with the Blue Jackets, recording an assist in an 5–4 overtime victory over the New York Islanders.

After three full seasons within the Blue Jackets organization as member of American Hockey League (AHL) affiliate Cleveland Monsters, McKown was traded to the Montreal Canadiens in exchange for Luke Tuch on June 25, 2026. Entering the offseason as a restricted free agent, McKown was tendered a qualifying offer by the Canadiens four days later, and signed a one-year extension with the team on July 20.

== International play ==
Internationally, McKown represented USA Hockey as part of the United States national junior team at the 2022 World Junior Ice Hockey Championships where his team ultimately finished in fifth place.

== Career statistics ==
=== Regular season and playoffs ===
			Regular season					Playoffs
Season	Team	League	GP	G	A	Pts	PIM	GP	G	A	Pts	PIM
2017–18	St. Louis AAA Blues	T1EHL	33	10	15	25	38	—	—	—	—	—
2018–19	U.S. National Development Team	USHL	27	2	4	6	26	2	0	0	0	2
2019–20	U.S. National Development Team	USHL	16	1	2	3	14	—	—	—	—	—
2020–21	Colorado College	NCHC	23	2	4	6	16	—	—	—	—	—
2021–22	Colorado College	NCHC	35	13	8	21	29	—	—	—	—	—
2022–23	Colorado College	NCHC	38	21	7	28	30	—	—	—	—	—
2022–23	Columbus Blue Jackets	NHL	12	0	2	2	8	—	—	—	—	—
2023–24	Cleveland Monsters	AHL	53	9	15	24	26	11	2	2	4	8
2024–25	Cleveland Monsters	AHL	68	13	18	31	34	6	1	1	2	2
2025–26	Cleveland Monsters	AHL	63	9	16	25	38	8	1	1	2	8
NHL totals			12	0	2	2	8	—	—	—	—	—

=== International ===
Year	Team	Event	Result	GP	G	A	Pts	PIM
2022	United States	WJC	5th	4	0	1	1	0
Junior totals				4	0	1	1	0

== Awards and honors ==
Award	Year	Ref
USHL
USA Hockey All-American Game	2020	
College
NCHC Honorable Mention All-Star Team	2023	
NCHC All-Tournament Team	2023	
