= Dillon Simpson =

Canadian ice hockey player

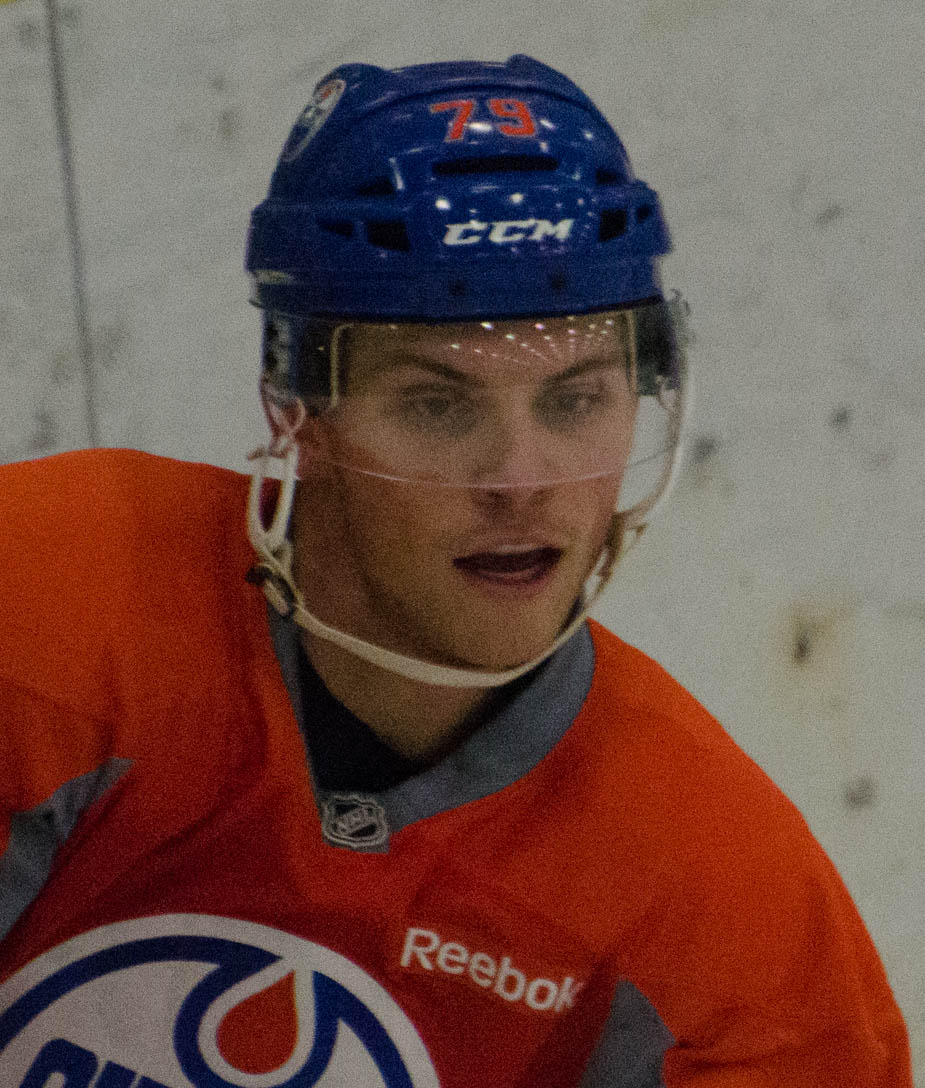
- Simpson with the Edmonton Oilers in 2014
- Born: February 10, 1993 (age 33) Edmonton, Alberta, Canada
- Height: 6 ft 2 in (188 cm)
- Weight: 194 lb (88 kg; 13 st 12 lb)
- Position: Defence
- Shot: Left
- Played for: Edmonton Oilers
- NHL draft: 92nd overall, 2011; Edmonton Oilers
- Playing career: 2014–2023 Coaching career

Current position
- Title: Assistant coach
- Team: North Dakota
- Conference: NCHC

Biographical details
- Education: University of North Dakota

Coaching career (HC unless noted)
- 2023–Present: North Dakota (assistant)

Dillon Simpson (born February 10, 1993) is a Canadian former professional ice hockey defenceman who is currently an assistant coach for the University of North Dakota Fighting Hawks. He was selected by the Edmonton Oilers in the fourth round (92nd overall) of the 2011 NHL entry draft. He is the son of former NHL forward Craig Simpson.

== Playing career ==
Simpson played collegiate hockey for the University of North Dakota in the NCAA Men's Division I National Collegiate Hockey Conference (NCHC). In his senior year, Simpson's outstanding play was rewarded with a selection to the inaugural 2013–14 All-NCHC First Team.

Simpson made his NHL debut with the Oilers on December 7, 2016, against the Philadelphia Flyers. He would play two more games with the team in the 2016-17 season.

After four seasons within the Oilers organization, Simpson left as a free agent and signed a two-year, two-way contract with the Columbus Blue Jackets on July 1, 2018. He was assigned to AHL affiliate, the Cleveland Monsters, for the duration of his contract with the Blue Jackets, adding a veteran presence to the blueline.

As a free agent from the Blue Jackets, Simpson opted to remain in the organization despite no NHL contract, agreeing to a one-year AHL extension with the Monsters on October 12, 2020.

== Coaching career ==
Simpson was hired as an assistant coach for the University of North Dakota on August 24, 2023.

== Career statistics ==
			Regular season					Playoffs
Season	Team	League	GP	G	A	Pts	PIM	GP	G	A	Pts	PIM
2008–09	Spruce Grove Saints	AJHL	1	0	0	0	0	1	0	0	0	2
2009–10	Spruce Grove Saints	AJHL	58	12	29	41	19	16	0	6	6	6
2010–11	U. of North Dakota	WCHA	30	2	8	10	8	—	—	—	—	—
2011–12	U. of North Dakota	WCHA	42	2	16	18	8	—	—	—	—	—
2012–13	U. of North Dakota	WCHA	42	5	19	24	12	—	—	—	—	—
2013–14	U. of North Dakota	NCHC	42	7	16	23	20	—	—	—	—	—
2014–15	Oklahoma City Barons	AHL	71	3	14	17	14	10	0	0	0	0
2015–16	Bakersfield Condors	AHL	57	4	16	20	20	—	—	—	—	—
2016–17	Bakersfield Condors	AHL	53	3	8	11	26	—	—	—	—	—
2016–17	Edmonton Oilers	NHL	3	0	0	0	2	—	—	—	—	—
2017–18	Bakersfield Condors	AHL	61	4	14	18	18	—	—	—	—	—
2018–19	Cleveland Monsters	AHL	75	3	14	17	16	8	1	3	4	4
2019–20	Cleveland Monsters	AHL	62	9	14	23	22	—	—	—	—	—
2020–21	Cleveland Monsters	AHL	23	6	11	17	4	—	—	—	—	—
2021–22	Cleveland Monsters	AHL	67	6	10	16	18	—	—	—	—	—
2022–23	Cleveland Monsters	AHL	29	1	1	2	4	—	—	—	—	—
NHL totals			3	0	0	0	2	—	—	—	—	—

== Awards and honours ==
Award	Year
College
All-NCHC First Team	2013–14
