= Luc Snuggerud =

American ice hockey player (born 1995)

- Born: January 2, 1995 (age 31) Edina, Minnesota, U.S.
- Height: 6 ft 0 in (183 cm)
- Weight: 184 lb (83 kg; 13 st 2 lb)
- Position: Defenseman
- Shot: Left
- Played for: Rockford IceHogs; Stavanger Oilers; Syracuse Crunch; Binghamton Devils; HC TWK Innsbruck; Rytíři Kladno; Bratislava Capitals; HC Košice
- NHL draft: 141st overall, 2014; Chicago Blackhawks
- Playing career: 2014–2022

Luc Snuggerud (born January 2, 1995) is an American former ice hockey defenseman. He was an All-American for Omaha.

== Playing career ==
Snuggerud was a star defenseman for Eden Prairie High School, receiving the Reed Larson award as the top defenseman in the state and leading the Eagles to the state tournament. After graduating, Snuggerud was selected by the Chicago Blackhawks in the 5th round of the NHL draft and then began preparing for his freshman season at Omaha. Snuggerud fit in well with the Mavericks, helping the team reach the NCAA Tournament, win its first two postseason games and appear in its first ever Frozen Four. Snuggerud was named to the conference All-Rookie team and continued the sturdy play as a sophomore. He was named an alternate captain as a junior and took a big step forward, nearly tripling his goal production. While Omaha could only manage a .500 record, Snuggerud was named an All-American.

After Omaha was eliminated from postseason contention, Snuggerud ended his college career by signing a three-year entry-level contract with the Blackhawks. He finished out the season with their minor league affiliate, the Rockford IceHogs. For his first full season as a pro, Snuggerud remained in the AHL and put up decent numbers, though he only played in about half of the team's games due to injury. His second season was an utter disaster as he was limited to just 4 games because of multiple concussions. Before the season was even over, Snuggerud was placed on unconditional waivers by Chicago and the remainder of his contract was bought out. Despite the health concerns, Snuggerud did return to the ice. He finished out the season with the Stavanger Oilers and helped the team reach their league semifinals.

The following fall, Snuggerud received a try-out from the Tampa Bay Lightning but he was released before the end of training camp. He then spend a little time in the AHL before returning to Europe and playing in the EBEL. After the season was cut short due to the COVID-19 pandemic, Snuggerud had to scrounge to find a home in 2020. He eventually wound up with Rytíři Kladno, playing alongside NHL legend Jaromír Jágr. He seemed to find his game during the season and proved solid on the blueline. Snuggerud helped the team win the 1st League championship and receive a promotion to the Czech Extraliga for 2021–22.

== Personal life ==
Both Luc's father Bo and his uncle Dave played college hockey. Dave is also a former NHL player, appearing in 265 games over six seasons. His cousin, Jimmy Snuggerud, was drafted 23rd overall by the St. Louis Blues in the 2022 NHL entry draft.

== Career statistics ==
=== Regular season and playoffs ===
			Regular season					Playoffs
Season	Team	League	GP	G	A	Pts	PIM	GP	G	A	Pts	PIM
2011–12	Eden Prairie High School	MN-HS	25	5	15	20	14	1	0	0	0	0
2012–13	Eden Prairie High School	MN-HS	25	5	33	38	24	2	0	4	4	2
2013–14	Eden Prairie High School	MN-HS	25	8	30	38	24	6	1	9	10	2
2013–14	Muskegon Lumberjacks	USHL	3	1	2	3	0	—	—	—	—	—
2013–14	Omaha Lancers	USHL	4	0	2	2	6	4	0	1	1	4
2014–15	Omaha	NCHC	39	2	14	16	18	—	—	—	—	—
2015–16	Omaha	NCHC	35	4	14	18	22	—	—	—	—	—
2016–17	Omaha	NCHC	39	11	20	31	36	—	—	—	—	—
2016–17	Rockford IceHogs	AHL	13	1	4	5	2	—	—	—	—	—
2017–18	Rockford IceHogs	AHL	40	5	12	17	24	—	—	—	—	—
2018–19	Rockford IceHogs	AHL	4	0	1	1	0	—	—	—	—	—
2018–19	Stavanger Oilers	GET-ligaen	5	2	2	4	14	12	3	4	7	8
2019–20	Syracuse Crunch	AHL	2	0	0	0	2	—	—	—	—	—
2019–20	Binghamton Devils	AHL	6	0	1	1	2	—	—	—	—	—
2019–20	HC TWK Innsbruck	EBEL	10	0	6	6	8	—	—	—	—	—
2020–21	Rytíři Kladno	Czech 1	12	2	8	10	8	16	0	8	8	18
2021–22	Bratislava Capitals	ICEHL	14	4	4	8	14	—	—	—	—	—
2021–22	HC Košice	Slovak	27	5	17	22	16	13	0	3	3	35
AHL totals			65	6	18	24	30	—	—	—	—	—

== Awards and honors ==
Award	Year
NCHC All-Rookie Team	2014–15
All-NCHC Second Team	2016–17
AHCA West Second Team All-American	2016–17
