= Massimo Rizzo (ice hockey) =

Canadian ice hockey player (born 2001)

- Born: June 13, 2001 (age 25) Burnaby, British Columbia, Canada
- Height: 5 ft 10 in (178 cm)
- Weight: 180 lb (82 kg; 12 st 12 lb)
- Position: Centre
- Shoots: Left
- NHL team: Free agent
- NHL draft: 216th overall, 2019; Carolina Hurricanes
- Playing career: 2024–present

Massimo Rizzo (June 13, 2001) is a Canadian professional ice hockey centre for Kalmar HC of HockeyAllsvenskan (Allsv). He was an All-American at the University of Denver and helped their ice hockey program win a national championship in 2022 and 2024.

== Playing career ==
The Burnaby native was a standout player in juniors, averaging at or near two points per game for his U-18 clubs before joining the Penticton Vees in 2017. While his production was lower, the competition was also much tougher. Despite dealing with multiple injuries in his second year, his scoring exploits made him attractive enough as a prospect for the Carolina Hurricanes to select Rizzo near the end of the 2019 NHL entry draft. The following year, Rizzo was a member of the Coquitlam Express and helped the club finish atop the league standings. Once they got into the postseason, Rizzo led the team in scoring by the end of the first round series, however, the COVID-19 pandemic forced the cancellation of the remainder of the playoffs. Rizzo sat out the entire season and prepared himself for the start of his collegiate career.

Rizzo debuted for the University of Denver in 2021 and joined a team that had narrowly missed the NCAA tournament the year before. He combined with several other freshmen to provide an instant boost for the Pioneers and propelled the team to a first-place finish in the National Collegiate Hockey Conference (NCHC). Denver stumbled a bit in the conference tournament but went on a run in the NCAA bracket. Rizzo scored the team's third goal in the title game and helped Denver win their ninth championship in program history. The following year, Rizzo led the team in scoring, helping them once again win a league crown. While he was named as an All-American, he could not get the team to repeat as champions and the Pioneers were knocked out in the first round.

On August 9, 2023, Rizzo's rights were traded along with a 2025 fifth-round pick to the Philadelphia Flyers from the Carolina Hurricanes in exchange for the rights to David Kaše. On April 17, 2024, Rizzo was signed to a two-year, entry-level contract by the Flyers.

During the 2025–26 season, having played exclusively in the ECHL with the Flyers secondary affiliate, the Reading Royals, Rizzo was traded by Philadelphia alongside Alexis Gendron to the Boston Bruins in exchange for Brett Harrison and Jackson Edward on March 6, 2026. Just six days later, Rizzo was traded a second time, going to the Nashville Predators alongside Dalton Bancroft in exchange for Navrin Mutter. Rizzo played out the remainder of the season with in the AHL with Predators affiliate, the Milwaukee Admirals, posting 5 points through 13 games.

On June 27, 2026, with his contract expiring, Rizzo was again traded, dealt by the Predators alongside a 2026 fifth-round pick to the New York Rangers in exchange for Adam Edström.

== Career statistics ==
			Regular season					Playoffs
Season	Team	League	GP	G	A	Pts	PIM	GP	G	A	Pts	PIM
2016–17	Penticton Vees	BCHL	3	0	0	0	0	7	1	0	1	0
2017–18	Penticton Vees	BCHL	50	13	26	39	20	11	4	6	10	6
2018–19	Penticton Vees	BCHL	37	11	29	40	24	6	3	3	6	2
2019–20	Coquitlam Express	BCHL	42	19	25	44	26	4	4	3	7	6
2021–22	University of Denver	NCHC	39	12	24	36	48	—	—	—	—	—
2022–23	University of Denver	NCHC	38	17	29	46	14	—	—	—	—	—
2023–24	University of Denver	NCHC	30	10	24	34	10	—	—	—	—	—
2024–25	Lehigh Valley Phantoms	AHL	46	6	12	18	10	—	—	—	—	—
2025–26	Reading Royals	ECHL	29	6	16	22	10	—	—	—	—	—
2025–26	Providence Bruins	AHL	1	0	0	0	0	—	—	—	—	—
2025–26	Milwaukee Admirals	AHL	13	2	3	5	4	—	—	—	—	—
AHL totals			60	8	15	23	14	—	—	—	—	—

== Awards and honours ==
Award	Year	Ref
College
NCHC All-Rookie Team	2022	
All-NCHC First Team	2023, 2024	
AHCA West Second Team All-American	2023, 2024	
