= Kaidan Mbereko =

American ice hockey player (born 2003)

- Born: July 28, 2003 (age 22) Aspen, Colorado, U.S.
- Height: 5 ft 11 in (180 cm)
- Weight: 185 lb (84 kg; 13 st 3 lb)
- Position: Goaltender
- Catches: Left
- ECHL team: Cincinnati Cyclones

Kaidan Mbereko (born July 28, 2003) is an American professional ice hockey goaltender for the Cincinnati Cyclones of the ECHL.

== Playing career ==
Mbereko spent one season with the Lincoln Stars of the United States Hockey League (USHL). During the 2021–22 season, he posted an 18–11–3 record, with a 3.01 goals against average (GAA) and .898 save percentage. He tied for sixth in the USHL with 18 victories and ranked 12th in save percentage.

Mbereko began his collegiate career for Colorado College during the 2022–23 season. During his freshman year he appeared in 30 games with 29 starts, and posted a 9–16–2 record, with a 2.30 GAA and .925 save percentage. He led the NCAA among freshmen goaltenders and ranked fifth overall with a .925 save percentage. Mbereko had the NCHC's best save percentage (.925), while his goals against average (2.30) was tied for third in the conference. Following the season, he was named to the All-NCHC Rookie Team and All-NCHC Second Team.

During the 2023–24 season, in his sophomore year, he started all 37 games and posted a 21–13–3 record, with a 2.40 GAA and .915 save percentage. During conference play, Mbereko made 24 starts and posted a 14–8–2 record, with his 14 wins tying for first in the conference. He led the NCHC with a 2.15 GAA and a .927 save percentage. He became the second player in NCHC history to receive three consecutive monthly awards as he was named NCHC goaltender of the month for December, January, and February. During the month of February, he posted a 3–2–1 record and led the NCHC with a .939 save percentage and 168 saves, and ranked second in the NCHC with a 1.79 GAA. He allowed two goals or fewer in five of his six starts and no more than three in any game, with all six games coming against ranked opponents. He was also named HCA National Goaltender of the Month for February 2024. Following an outstanding season he named the NCHC Goaltender of the Year, and a unanimous All-NCHC First Team selection. He was also named an AHCA West First Team All-American and a top-three finalist for the Mike Richter Award.

Mbereko signed a professional contract with the Cincinnati Cyclones of the ECHL on March 16, 2026.

== Personal life ==
Mbereko was born to Isaac and Lauren Mbereko and has one brother, Zak. His father played professional rugby in Zimbabwe for 20 years.

== International play ==
Medal record

Representing United States

Ice hockey

World Junior Championships
Bronze medal – third place	2023 Canada	

Mbereko represented the United States at the 2021 IIHF World U18 Championships where he appeared in three games and recorded one win with a 2.85 GAA and .915 save percentage.

Mbereko represented the United States at the 2022 World Junior Ice Hockey Championships, where he recorded three wins and one loss, with a 1.76 GAA and .921 save percentage. He again represented the United States at the 2023 World Junior Ice Hockey Championships where he recorded one win and one loss, with a 4.64 GAA and .829 save percentage and won a bronze medal.

== Career statistics ==
=== Regular season and playoffs ===
Season	Team	League	GP	W	L	T	MIN	GA	SO	GAA	SV%
2021–22	Lincoln Stars	USHL	35	18	11	3	1,893	95	1	3.01	.898
2022–23	Colorado College	NCHC	30	9	16	2	1,645	63	4	2.30	.925
2023–24	Colorado College	NCHC	37	21	13	3	2,227	89	0	2.40	.915
2024–25	Colorado College	NCHC	31	15	15	1	1,810	80	2	2.65	.905
2025–26	Colorado College	NCHC	30	12	13	4	1,756	74	0	2.53	.915
NCAA totals			130	57	57	10	7,438	306	6	2.47	.915

=== International ===
Year	Team	Event	Result	GP	W	L	T	MIN	GA	SO	GAA	SV%
2021	United States	U18	5th	3	1	0	0	147	7	0	2.85	.915
2022	United States	WJC	5th	4	3	1	0	238	7	0	1.76	.921
2023	United States	WJC	3rd place, bronze medalist(s)	3	1	1	0	90	7	0	4.64	.829
Junior totals				10	5	2	0	475	21	0	2.65	.903

== Awards and honors ==
Award	Year
College
All-NCHC Second Team	2023
All-NCHC Rookie Team	2023
All-NCHC First Team	2024
NCHC Goaltender of the Year	2024
AHCA West First Team All-American	2024

Awards and achievements
Preceded by Magnus Chrona	NCHC Goaltender of the Year; 2023–24	Succeeded by Simon Latkoczy
