= Louie Belpedio =

American ice hockey player (born 1996)

- Born: May 14, 1996 (age 30) Skokie, Illinois, U.S.
- Height: 5 ft 11 in (180 cm)
- Weight: 193 lb (88 kg; 13 st 11 lb)
- Position: Defense
- Shoots: Right
- NHL team (P) Cur. team Former teams: Washington Capitals; Hershey Bears (AHL); Minnesota Wild; Philadelphia Flyers
- NHL draft: 80th overall, 2014; Minnesota Wild
- Playing career: 2018–present

Louie Belpedio (born May 14, 1996) is an American professional ice hockey defenseman currently playing for the Hershey Bears in the American Hockey League (AHL) while under contract to the Washington Capitals of the National Hockey League (NHL). He was selected in the third round, 80th overall, by the Minnesota Wild in the 2014 NHL entry draft.

== Playing career ==
Belpedio played midget hockey within the Culver Military Academy in Indiana. He continued his development playing within the USA Hockey National Team Development Program in the United States Hockey League.

Upon completing a four-year collegiate career with Miami University (Ohio) in the 2017–18 campaign, Belpedio initially joined the Wild's AHL affiliate, the Iowa Wild on an amateur try-out contract on March 16, 2018.

After 10 games with Iowa, Belpedio signed a two-year, entry-level contract with the draft club, the Minnesota Wild, on April 5, 2018. He joined the playoff bound Wild roster and made his NHL debut, recording two assists and becoming the first player in Wild history to record a multi-point game in his NHL debut, in a season finale 6–3 victory over the San Jose Sharks on April 7, 2018. Belpedio remained on the roster through the Wilds' first round playoff exit, without featuring in a game.

Belpedio remained with the Wild for four seasons before leaving as a free agent and signing a one-year, two-way contract with the Montreal Canadiens on July 28, 2021.

On July 13, 2022, Belpedio was signed as a free agent to a one-year, two-way contract with the Philadelphia Flyers.

Belpedio signed a two-year, two-way contract with the Washington Capitals on July 2, 2025.

== Career statistics ==
=== Regular season and playoffs ===
			Regular season					Playoffs
Season	Team	League	GP	G	A	Pts	PIM	GP	G	A	Pts	PIM
2010–11	Culver Military Academy	Midget	36	3	13	16	31	—	—	—	—	—
2011–12	Culver Military Academy	Midget	26	8	12	20	36	—	—	—	—	—
2012–13	U.S. National Development Team	USHL	38	0	4	4	23	—	—	—	—	—
2013–14	U.S. National Development Team	USHL	26	5	10	15	24	—	—	—	—	—
2014–15	Miami RedHawks	NCHC	40	6	13	19	28	—	—	—	—	—
2015–16	Miami RedHawks	NCHC	34	4	13	17	30	—	—	—	—	—
2016–17	Miami RedHawks	NCHC	24	6	11	17	39	—	—	—	—	—
2017–18	Miami RedHawks	NCHC	37	9	21	30	42	—	—	—	—	—
2017–18	Iowa Wild	AHL	10	0	2	2	0	—	—	—	—	—
2017–18	Minnesota Wild	NHL	1	0	2	2	0	—	—	—	—	—
2018–19	Iowa Wild	AHL	70	6	15	21	50	11	1	2	3	9
2018–19	Minnesota Wild	NHL	2	0	0	0	0	—	—	—	—	—
2019–20	Iowa Wild	AHL	62	5	15	20	102	—	—	—	—	—
2020–21	Iowa Wild	AHL	23	3	5	8	28	—	—	—	—	—
2020–21	Minnesota Wild	NHL	1	0	0	0	0	—	—	—	—	—
2021–22	Laval Rocket	AHL	69	11	19	30	92	15	2	8	10	20
2022–23	Lehigh Valley Phantoms	AHL	70	8	19	27	81	2	0	1	1	2
2023–24	Lehigh Valley Phantoms	AHL	38	4	6	10	55	6	0	4	4	30
2023–24	Philadelphia Flyers	NHL	12	2	2	4	0	—	—	—	—	—
2024–25	Lehigh Valley Phantoms	AHL	66	5	23	28	88	7	0	1	1	9
2025–26	Hershey Bears	AHL	68	9	25	34	67	6	0	1	1	6
NHL totals			16	2	4	6	0	—	—	—	—	—

=== International ===
Year	Team	Event	Result	GP	G	A	Pts	PIM
2013	United States	U17	3rd place, bronze medalist(s)	6	0	3	3	2
2014	United States	U18	1st place, gold medalist(s)	7	0	2	2	0
2016	United States	WJC	3rd place, bronze medalist(s)	7	1	1	2	0
Junior totals				20	1	6	7	2

== Awards and honors ==
Award	Year
College
NCHC All-Rookie Team	2015
NCHC All-Tournament Team	2015
NCHC Honorable Mention All-Star Team	2016, 2017
NCHC Second All-Star Team	2018
