= Shai Buium =

Israeli-American ice hockey player (born 2003)

- Born: March 26, 2003 (age 23) San Diego, California, U.S.
- Height: 6 ft 3 in (191 cm)
- Weight: 220 lb (100 kg; 15 st 10 lb)
- Position: Defense
- Shoots: Left
- NHL team (P) Cur. team: Detroit Red Wings; Grand Rapids Griffins (AHL)
- NHL draft: 36th overall, 2021; Detroit Red Wings
- Playing career: 2024–present

Shai Buium (born March 26, 2003) is an Israeli-American professional ice hockey defenseman for the Grand Rapids Griffins of the American Hockey League (AHL) as a prospect for the Detroit Red Wings of the National Hockey League (NHL). He played college ice hockey at the University of Denver.

== Playing career ==
Buium played two seasons for the Sioux City Musketeers. During the 2019–20 season, he recorded one assist in four games. During the 2020–21 season, in his first full season with the Musketeers, he recorded four goals and 22 assists in 50 regular season games and one goal and two assists in four playoff games. Following the season he was named to the USHL All-Rookie Second Team. On July 24, 2021, he was drafted in the second round, 36th overall, by the Detroit Red Wings in the 2021 NHL entry draft.

Buium began his collegiate career for the Denver Pioneers during the 2021–22 season. During his freshman year he recorded three goals and 15 assists in 39 games and helped Denver win the national championship. He ranked third among defensemen in shots with 65 and added seven power-play assists, third-most among team defensemen. Following the season he was named to the All-NCHC Rookie Team. During the 2022–23 season, in his sophomore year, he recorded four goals and 17 assists in 38 games. He ranked fourth on the team with 32 blocked shots.

During the 2023–24 season, in his junior year, he recorded a career-high seven goals and 29 assists in 43 games. He ranked fifth on the team in scoring and tied for third in assists, both of which were the second-most by a Denver defenseman, trailing only his brother Zeev Buium. His 36 points ranked eighth in the NCAA among defensemen while his 29 assists tied for sixth. He finished the season with a +33 plus/minus rating, tied with his brother Zeev for the highest ever by a Pioneer since the statistic first began being tracked in 2005–06. During the national championship game at the 2024 NCAA Division I men's ice hockey tournament he assisted on the game-winning goal against Boston College. Following the season he was named to the All-NCHC Second Team. He was also named a finalist for the NCHC Defensive Defenseman of the Year and NCHC Offensive Defenseman of the Year. He finished his collegiate career with 14 goals and 61 assists with a plus-61 rating in 120 games and won two national championships in three years with the Pioneers.

On April 17, 2024, Buium signed a three-year, entry-level contract with the Detroit Red Wings. He also signed an amateur tryout (ATO) with the Red Wings' AHL affiliate, the Grand Rapids Griffins. He made his professional debut for the Griffins on April 19, 2024, in a game against the Iowa Wild. On October 10, 2024, Buium was activated from the injured non-roster and assigned to the Grand Rapids Griffins.

== Personal life ==
Buium was born in San Diego, California, to Israeli immigrants Sorin and Miriam Buium, who came to the U.S. from Ashdod, Israel in 1999. He is Jewish, and fasts on Yom Kippur. His mother, Miriam, played professional basketball in Israel before an injury ended her playing career and she transitioned to being a general manager in the sport. Buium's younger brother, Zeev, was also a college ice hockey player at Denver and currently plays for the Vancouver Canucks.

== Career statistics ==
			Regular season					Playoffs
Season	Team	League	GP	G	A	Pts	PIM	GP	G	A	Pts	PIM
2019–20	Sioux City Musketeers	USHL	3	0	1	1	2	—	—	—	—	—
2020–21	Sioux City Musketeers	USHL	50	4	22	26	27	4	1	2	3	0
2021–22	University of Denver	NCHC	39	3	15	18	12	—	—	—	—	—
2022–23	University of Denver	NCHC	38	4	17	21	18	—	—	—	—	—
2023–24	University of Denver	NCHC	43	7	29	36	14	—	—	—	—	—
2023–24	Grand Rapids Griffins	AHL	1	0	0	0	0	—	—	—	—	—
2024–25	Grand Rapids Griffins	AHL	67	2	23	25	22	3	0	0	0	0
2025–26	Grand Rapids Griffins	AHL	36	3	11	14	8	—	—	—	—	—
AHL totals			104	5	34	39	30	3	0	0	0	0

== Awards and honors ==
College
Award	Year
All-NCHC Rookie Team	2022
All-NCHC Second Team	2024

== See also ==
- List of select Jewish ice hockey players
