= Dylan Anhorn =

Canadian ice hockey player (born 1999)

- Born: January 21, 1999 (age 27) Calgary, Alberta, Canada
- Height: 6 ft 0 in (183 cm)
- Weight: 190 lb (86 kg; 13 st 8 lb)
- Position: Defence
- Shoots: Left
- NHL team (P) Cur. team: Chicago Blackhawks; Rockford IceHogs (AHL)
- NHL draft: Undrafted
- Playing career: 2024–present

Dylan Anhorn (born January 21, 1999) is a Canadian professional ice hockey defenceman for the Rockford IceHogs of the American Hockey League (AHL) while under contract to the Chicago Blackhawks of the National Hockey League (NHL). He played college ice hockey at Union College and St. Cloud State.

== Playing career ==
=== Junior ===
Anhorn played two seasons for the Prince George Spruce Kings of the British Columbia Hockey League (BCHL). During the 2017–18 season he recorded five goals and 20 assists in 58 regular season games, and one goal and ten assists in 24 playoff games. During the 2018–19 season he recorded five goals and 22 assists in 53 regular season games, and three goals and seven assists in 17 playoff games, and helped the Spruce Kings win their first-ever Fred Page Cup and Doyle Cup championships in 2019.

=== College ===
Anhorn began his collegiate career for Union during the 2019–20 season. During his freshman year he was one of two rookies to play in all 37 games, and ranked third on the team in scoring with six goals and ten assists for 16 points. He led the team in plus-minus and ranked fourth in blocked shots (46). Following the season he was named to the All-ECAC Rookie Team. On November 17, 2020, Union cancelled the 2020–21 season due to the COVID-19 pandemic. During the 2021–22 season, in his junior year, he served as alternate captain and recorded seven goals and 13 assists in 29 games. His 20 points ranked fourth on the team, while he ranked third in goals and assists.

Anhorn transferred to St. Cloud State for the 2022–23 season. During his senior year he recorded five goals and 20 assist in 23 games before suffering a season-ending injury. Despite missing nearly half the season, he finished third on the team in assists (20) and fifth in points (25). At the time of his injury, he led all defenceman in scoring with 25 points. He broke three bones in his foot and suffered ligament damage during a pregame warmup game of sewer ball on January 21, 2023.

He was named a Hobey Baker Award nominee for 2022-23.

On April 19, 2023, Anhorn announced he would return to St. Cloud State for a fifth year. During the 2023–24 season, he recorded six goals and 27 assists in 38 games. During conference play he recorded 22 points in 24 NCHC games, which ranked was third among defencemen. His 18 assists ranked fifth in conference play and trailed only Zeev Buium among defencemen. Following the season he was named to the All-NCHC First Team and an AHCA West Second Team All-American. He was also named a Hobey Baker Award nominee again in 2023-24.

He finished his collegiate career with 24 goals and 70 assists in 127 games.

=== Professional ===
On April 5, 2024, Anhorn signed a one-year contract with the Manitoba Moose of the AHL for the 2024–25. He joined the team for the remainder of the 2023–24 AHL season on an amateur tryout (ATO).

After three seasons within the Moose organization, Anhorn left as a free agent and secured his first NHL contract in signing a one-year, two-way contract for the 2026–27 season with the Chicago Blackhawks on July 1, 2026.

== Personal life ==
Anhorn was born to Jodi and Kathie Anhorn.

== Career statistics ==
			Regular season					Playoffs
Season	Team	League	GP	G	A	Pts	PIM	GP	G	A	Pts	PIM
2015–16	Olds Grizzlys	AJHL	4	0	0	0	0	—	—	—	—	—
2016–17	Olds Grizzlys	AJHL	6	0	0	0	0	2	0	0	0	0
2017–18	Prince George Spruce Kings	BCHL	58	5	20	25	30	24	1	10	11	14
2018–19	Prince George Spruce Kings	BCHL	53	5	22	27	22	17	3	7	10	6
2019–20	Union College	ECAC	37	6	10	16	22	—	—	—	—	—
2021–22	Union College	ECAC	29	7	13	20	6	—	—	—	—	—
2022–23	St. Cloud State University	NCHC	23	5	20	25	12	—	—	—	—	—
2023–24	St. Cloud State University	NCHC	38	6	27	33	34	—	—	—	—	—
2023–24	Manitoba Moose	AHL	2	0	1	1	0	1	0	0	0	0
2024–25	Manitoba Moose	AHL	47	3	13	16	43	—	—	—	—	—
2025–26	Manitoba Moose	AHL	46	3	14	17	18	7	1	2	3	0
AHL totals			95	6	28	34	61	8	1	2	3	0

== Awards and honors ==
Award	Year
College
All-ECAC Rookie Team	2020
All-NCHC First Team	2024
AHCA West Second Team All-American	2024
