= List of NCHC All-Tournament Teams =

The NCHC All-Tournament Team is an honor bestowed at the conclusion of the conference tournament to the players judged to have performed the best during the championship. The team is composed of three forwards, two defensemen and one goaltender with additional players named in the event of a tie.

The All-Tournament Team was first awarded after the inaugural championship in 2014.

== All-Tournament Teams ==
=== 2010s ===
2014
Player	Pos	Team
Sam Brittain	G	Denver
Joey LaLeggia	D	Denver
Nolan Zajac	D	Denver
Daniel Doremus	F	Denver
Ty Loney	F	Denver
Anthony Louis	F	Miami

2015
Player	Pos	Team
Charlie Lindgren	G	St. Cloud State
Louie Belpedio	D	Miami
Tim Daly	D	St. Cloud State
Blake Coleman	F	Miami
Austin Czarnik	F	Miami
Joey Benik	F	St. Cloud State

2016
Player	Pos	Team
Charlie Lindgren	G	St. Cloud State
Ethan Prow	D	St. Cloud State
Willie Raskob	D	Minnesota Duluth
Mikey Eyssimont	F	St. Cloud State
Dominic Toninato	F	Minnesota Duluth
Nick Schmaltz	F	North Dakota

2017
Player	Pos	Team
Hunter Miksa	G	Minnesota Duluth
Tucker Poolman	D	North Dakota
Neal Pionk	D	Minnesota Duluth
Alex Iafallo	F	Minnesota Duluth
Tyson Jost	F	North Dakota
Dominic Toninato	F	Minnesota Duluth

2018
Player	Pos	Team
Tanner Jaillet	G	Denver
Ian Mitchell	D	Denver
Jack Ahcan	D	St. Cloud State
Henrik Borgström	F	Denver
Nick Poehling	F	St. Cloud State
Logan O'Connor	F	Denver

2019
Player	Pos	Team
Hunter Shepard	G	Minnesota Duluth
Jimmy Schuldt	D	St. Cloud State
Mikey Anderson	D	Minnesota Duluth
Robby Jackson	F	St. Cloud State
Blake Lizotte	F	St. Cloud State
Patrick Newell	F	St. Cloud State

=== 2020s ===
2020
Tournament Cancelled

2021
Player	Pos	Team
Adam Scheel	G	North Dakota
Nick Perbix	D	St. Cloud State
Jake Sanderson	D	North Dakota
Collin Adams	F	North Dakota
Gavin Hain	F	North Dakota
Riese Gaber	F	North Dakota

2022
Player	Pos	Team
Ryan Fanti	G	Minnesota Duluth
Ronnie Attard	D	Western Michigan
Wyatt Kaiser	D	Minnesota Duluth
Blake Biondi	F	Minnesota Duluth
Ty Glover	F	Western Michigan
Dominic James	F	Minnesota Duluth

2023
Player	Pos	Team
Jaxon Castor	G	St. Cloud State
Bryan Yoon	D	Colorado College
Jack Peart	D	St. Cloud State
Jami Krannila	F	St. Cloud State
Zach Okabe	F	St. Cloud State
Hunter McKown	F	Colorado College

2024
Player	Pos	Team
Šimon Latkoczy	G	Omaha
Zeev Buium	D	Denver
Griffin Ludtke	D	Omaha
McKade Webster	F	Denver
Zach Urdahl	F	Omaha
Miko Matikka	F	Denver

2025
Player	Pos	Team
Matt Davis	G	Denver
Zeev Buium	D	Denver
Joona Väisänen	D	Western Michigan
Alex Bump	F	Western Michigan
Sacha Boisvert	F	North Dakota
Artem Shlaine	F	Arizona State

2026
Player	Pos	Team
Johnny Hicks	G	Denver
Boston Buckberger	D	Denver
Eric Pohlkamp	D	Denver
Max Plante	F	Minnesota Duluth
Rieger Lorenz	F	Denver
Zam Plante	F	Minnesota Duluth

=== All-Tournament Team players by school ===
School	Winners
Denver	18
St. Cloud State	17
Minnesota Duluth	14
North Dakota	9
Miami	4
Western Michigan	4
Omaha	3
Colorado College	2
Arizona State	1

=== Multiple appearances ===
Player	All-Tournament Team appearances
Zeev Buium	2
Charlie Lindgren	2
Dominic Toninato	2

== See also ==
- NCHC Awards
- Tournament MVP
