= Brandon Scanlin =

Canadian ice hockey player (born 1999)

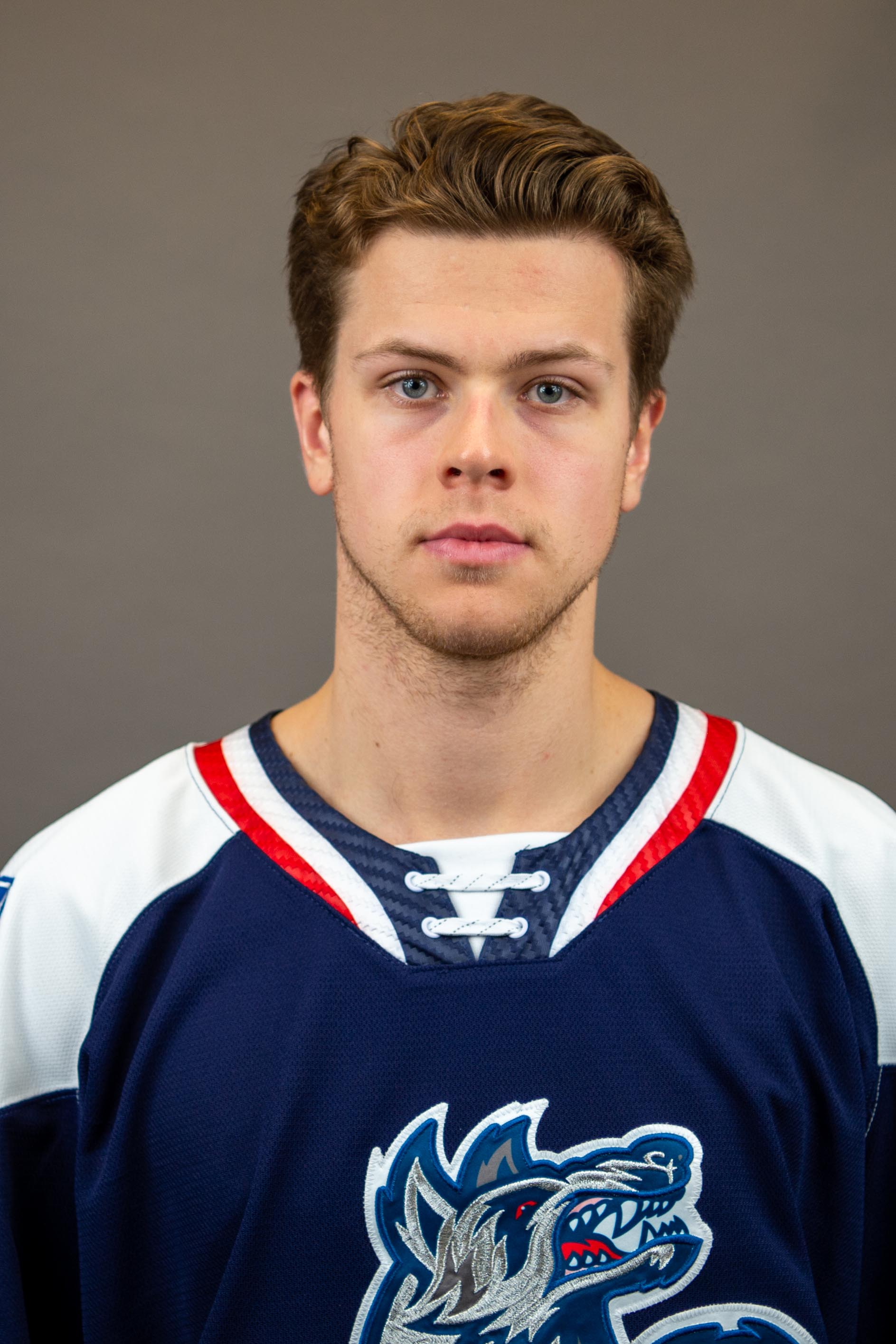
- Scanlin with the Hartford Wolf Pack
- Born: June 2, 1999 (age 27) Hamilton, Ontario, Canada
- Height: 6 ft 4 in (193 cm)
- Weight: 214 lb (97 kg; 15 st 4 lb)
- Position: Defense
- Shoots: Left
- AHL team Former teams: Hamilton Hammers; New York Rangers
- NHL draft: Undrafted
- Playing career: 2022–present

Brandon Scanlin (born June 2, 1999) is a Canadian professional ice hockey defenceman for the Hamilton Hammers in the American Hockey League (AHL). He has previously played with the New York Rangers of the National Hockey League (NHL).

== Playing career ==
Scanlin played collegiate hockey for the University of Nebraska-Omaha. Before college he played for the Brooks Bandits of the Alberta Junior Hockey League. He was undrafted by the NHL, but after his college career ended in 2022 he was signed as a free agent by the Rangers. The Rangers sent him to their American Hockey League affiliate, the Hartford Wolf Pack, where he played 15 games in the 2021–22 season, scoring no goals and one assist.

In 61 games for the Wolf Pack in 2022–23, he scored 4 goals and had 11 assists. In the 2023–24 season he again started the campaign with the Hartford Wolf Pack. In February 2024 he signed a two-year contract extension with the Rangers. He was recalled to the Rangers on March 18 due to an injury to Ryan Lindgren and made his NHL debut on March 26 in a game against the Philadelphia Flyers. After Hartford was eliminated from the Calder Cup playoffs, he was recalled to the Rangers roster for the Stanley Cup playoffs.

As a free agent from the Rangers, Scanlin secured a one-year AHL contract with the Hamilton Hammers, affiliate to the New York Islanders, on July 23, 2026.

== Career statistics ==
			Regular season					Playoffs
Season	Team	League	GP	G	A	Pts	PIM	GP	G	A	Pts	PIM
2015–16	Brantford 99ers	GOJHL	49	2	28	30	24	5	2	2	4	0
2016–17	Brantford 99ers	GOJHL	50	4	23	27	32	4	0	1	1	2
2017–18	Brooks Bandits	AJHL	58	8	33	41	28	5	1	4	5	0
2018–19	Brooks Bandits	AJHL	40	16	27	43	22	7	1	5	6	4
2019–20	University of Nebraska-Omaha	NCHC	36	3	11	14	16	—	—	—	—	—
2020–21	University of Nebraska-Omaha	NCHC	24	2	15	17	14	—	—	—	—	—
2021–22	University of Nebraska-Omaha	NCHC	38	6	25	31	31	—	—	—	—	—
2021–22	Hartford Wolf Pack	AHL	15	0	1	1	2	—	—	—	—	—
2022–23	Hartford Wolf Pack	AHL	61	4	11	15	30	9	0	1	1	0
2023–24	Hartford Wolf Pack	AHL	64	8	8	16	39	10	0	0	0	2
2023–24	New York Rangers	NHL	1	0	0	0	0	—	—	—	—	—
2024–25	Hartford Wolf Pack	AHL	66	8	6	14	30	—	—	—	—	—
2025–26	Hartford Wolf Pack	AHL	49	4	7	11	54	—	—	—	—	—
NHL totals			1	0	0	0	0	—	—	—	—	—
