= Dave Snuggerud =

American ice hockey player (born 1966)

- Born: June 20, 1966 (age 60) Minnetonka, Minnesota, U S.
- Height: 6 ft 0 in (183 cm)
- Weight: 190 lb (86 kg; 13 st 8 lb)
- Position: Right wing
- Shot: Left
- Played for: Buffalo Sabres; San Jose Sharks; Philadelphia Flyers
- National team: United States
- NHL draft: 1987 NHL Supplemental Draft; Buffalo Sabres
- Playing career: 1989–1995

David Wilmer Snuggerud (born June 20, 1966) is an American former professional ice hockey right wing who played in the National Hockey League (NHL) between 1989 and 1993. He was drafted by the Buffalo Sabres in the 1987 NHL Supplemental Draft out of the University of Minnesota. Internationally Snuggerud played for the American national team at the 1988 Winter Olympics and the 1989 World Championships.

== Playing career ==
After playing three seasons for the Golden Gophers and one for the U.S. National Team, Snuggerud joined the Sabres for the 1989–90 season. After two-plus seasons with the Sabres, he was traded to the San Jose Sharks during the 1991–92 season in exchange for Wayne Presley.

Snuggerud finished his NHL career with the Philadelphia Flyers in the 1992–93 season. After one year playing with the IHL's Minnesota Moose, Snuggerud retired. He was a sixth-grade gold team science teacher at Wayzata East Middle School. In his NHL career, Snuggerud appeared in 265 games. He scored 30 goals and added 54 assists. He had 2 fights total in his career.

He also played for the American national team at the 1988 Winter Olympics and the 1989 World Championships.

Snuggerud is founder and headmaster at Breakaway Academy in Chaska, Minnesota and the head coach at Chaska High School.

== Personal life ==
Snuggerud's nephew, Luc Snuggerud, was drafted by the Chicago Blackhawks in the 2014 NHL entry draft. Snuggerud's son, Jimmy, was drafted 23rd overall by the St. Louis Blues in the 2022 NHL entry draft.

== Career statistics ==
=== Regular season and playoffs ===
			Regular season					Playoffs
Season	Team	League	GP	G	A	Pts	PIM	GP	G	A	Pts	PIM
1983–84	Hopkins High School	HS-MN	17	10	19	29	30	—	—	—	—	—
1984–85	Minneapolis Stars	USHL	48	38	35	73	26	9	3	3	6
1985–86	University of Minnesota	WCHA	42	14	18	32	47	—	—	—	—	—
1986–87	University of Minnesota	WCHA	39	30	29	59	38	—	—	—	—	—
1987–88	United States National Team	Intl	51	14	21	35	26	—	—	—	—	—
1988–89	University of Minnesota	WCHA	45	29	20	49	39	—	—	—	—	—
1989–90	Buffalo Sabres	NHL	80	14	16	30	41	6	0	0	0	2
1990–91	Buffalo Sabres	NHL	80	9	15	24	32	6	1	3	4	4
1991–92	Buffalo Sabres	NHL	55	3	15	18	36	—	—	—	—	—
1991–92	San Jose Sharks	NHL	11	0	1	1	4	—	—	—	—	—
1992–93	San Jose Sharks	NHL	25	4	5	9	14	—	—	—	—	—
1992–93	Philadelphia Flyers	NHL	14	0	2	2	0	—	—	—	—	—
1994–95	Minnesota Moose	IHL	72	25	23	48	57	3	0	1	1	2
NHL totals			265	30	54	84	127	12	1	3	4	6

=== International ===
Year	Team	Event	GP	G	A	Pts	PIM
1988	United States	OLY	6	3	2	5	4
1989	United States	WC	10	4	1	5	2
Senior totals			16	7	3	10	6

== Awards and honors ==
Award	Year
All-WCHA Second Team	1988–89
AHCA West Second-Team All-American	1988–89
