= Alex Bump =

American ice hockey player (born 2003)

- Born: November 20, 2003 (age 22) Prior Lake, Minnesota, U.S.
- Height: 6 ft 0 in (183 cm)
- Weight: 195 lb (88 kg; 13 st 13 lb)
- Position: Left wing
- Shoots: Left
- NHL team: Philadelphia Flyers
- NHL draft: 133rd overall, 2022; Philadelphia Flyers
- Playing career: 2025–present

Alexander Bump (born November 20, 2003) is an American professional ice hockey player who is a left winger for the Philadelphia Flyers of the National Hockey League (NHL). He was drafted 133rd overall by the Flyers in the 2022 NHL entry draft.

== Playing career ==
=== Junior ===
During the 2021–22 season, Bump recorded 11 goals and six assists in 27 games for the Omaha Lancers of the United States Hockey League (USHL). During the 2022–23 season, he recorded nine goals and 17 assists in 32 games for the Lancers. On February 7, 2023, he was traded to the Tri-City Storm. In 16 regular season games with the Storm, he recorded five goals and eight assists. During the playoffs he recorded three goals and one assist in four games.

=== College ===
Bump was originally committed to play college ice hockey at Vermont, however, in August 2023, he left the program after former head coach Todd Woodcroft was fired. The next month he transferred to Western Michigan. During the 2023–24 season, in his freshman year, he recorded 14 goals and 22 assists in 38 games. In February 2024, he was named National Collegiate Hockey Conference (NCHC) Rookie of the Month. During the month he recorded five goals and four assists in six games. He tied for the league lead in goals with five and was ranked in the NCHC with nine points. Following the season he was named to the All-NCHC Rookie Team, and named a finalist for the NCHC Rookie of the Year.

During the 2024–25 season, in his sophomore year, he led the team in scoring and recorded 15 goals and 14 assists in 24 conference games. His 29 points ranked third in the conference. Following the season he was named to the All-NCHC First Team, and NCHC Forward of the Year. During the championship game of the 2025 NCHC Tournament against Denver, Bump scored two goals, including the game-winning goal in double-overtime, to help Western Michigan win their first NCHC tournament championship in program history. He was subsequently named the Frozen Faceoff MVP.

=== Professional ===
Bump was signed to a three-year, entry-level contract with the Flyers on April 15, 2025.

== Personal life ==
Bump was born to Rick Bump and Cheryl Kerek, and has three older siblings, Connor, Tyler and Hannah.

== Career statistics ==
			Regular season					Playoffs
Season	Team	League	GP	G	A	Pts	PIM	GP	G	A	Pts	PIM
2021–22	Omaha Lancers	USHL	27	11	6	17	32	4	2	1	3	2
2022–23	Omaha Lancers	USHL	32	9	17	26	44	—	—	—	—	—
2022–23	Tri-City Storm	USHL	16	5	8	13	20	4	3	1	4	2
2023–24	Western Michigan University	NCHC	38	14	22	36	27	—	—	—	—	—
2024–25	Western Michigan University	NCHC	42	23	24	47	14	—	—	—	—	—
2024–25	Lehigh Valley Phantoms	AHL	2	1	2	3	0	7	2	0	2	2
2025–26	Lehigh Valley Phantoms	AHL	36	11	15	26	22	—	—	—	—	—
2025–26	Philadelphia Flyers	NHL	17	5	4	9	2	6	2	0	2	0
NHL totals			17	5	4	9	2	6	2	0	2	0

== Awards and honors ==
Award	Year	Ref
College
All-NCHC Rookie Team	2024	
All-NCHC First Team	2025	
NCHC Forward of the Year	2025	
AHCA West First Team All-American	2025	
NCHC All-Tournament Team	2025	
Frozen Faceoff MVP	2025	

Awards and achievements
Preceded by Jackson Blake	NCHC Forward of the Year; 2024–25	Succeeded by Max Plante
