= Jackson Blake =

American ice hockey player (born 2003)

- Born: August 3, 2003 (age 23) Fargo, North Dakota, U.S.
- Height: 5 ft 11 in (180 cm)
- Weight: 185 lb (84 kg; 13 st 3 lb)
- Position: Right wing
- Shoots: Right
- NHL team: Carolina Hurricanes
- NHL draft: 109th overall, 2021; Carolina Hurricanes
- Playing career: 2024–present

Jackson Blake (born August 3, 2003) is an American professional ice hockey player who is a right winger for the Carolina Hurricanes of the National Hockey League (NHL). He played college ice hockey at North Dakota. Blake won the Stanley Cup with the Hurricanes in 2026.

== Playing career ==
=== Early years ===
Blake was born in Fargo, North Dakota, and grew up in Eden Prairie, Minnesota. He played one year of ice hockey at Shattuck-Saint Mary's before playing at Eden Prairie High School. During his sophomore year at Eden Prairie the Eagles finished as runner-up in the Class 2A state tournament. In his junior year at Eden Prairie, he recorded 20 goals and 38 assists in 19 games. He scored the game winning double-overtime goal to help Eden Prairie win the 2021 Class 2A state championship. During the 2020–21 USHL season, he recorded seven goals and ten assists in 25 games for the Chicago Steel. During the Clark Cup playoffs he recorded one goal in eight games and won the Clark Cup championship. During the 2021–22 season, he recorded 27 goals and 50 assists in 51 games. Following the season he was named All-USHL Third Team.

Blake was selected in the fourth round, 109th overall, by the Carolina Hurricanes in the 2021 NHL entry draft.

=== College ===
Blake began his collegiate career for North Dakota during the 2022–23 season, where he led the team in scoring with 16 goals and 26 assists in 39 games. In his freshman year, he led all NCHC rookies in conference scoring with 29 points. This was the third-most points by a freshman in conference play in NCHC history. Following the season, he was named to the All-NCHC Rookie Team, All-NCHC Second Team, and named NCHC Rookie of the Year.

During the 2023–24 season, in his sophomore year, he recorded 22 goals and 38 assists in 40 games. He ranked fourth in points and tied for third in assists among all Division I players. In conference play, he led the NCHC in scoring with 11 goals and 26 assists for 37 points. His 37 points broke the conference record for points in a season. He became only the fifth player since the 1989–90 season at North Dakota to record at least 40 points in each of his first two seasons. Following the season he was named a unanimous All-NCHC First Team selection, the NCHC Player of the Year and NCHC Forward of the Year. He was also named a Hobey Hat Trick finalist for the 2024 Hobey Baker Award.

=== Professional ===
On April 10, 2024, Blake signed a three-year, entry-level contract with the Carolina Hurricanes of the NHL. He made his debut on April 16, 2024 in the Hurricanes' regular-season finale, a 6–3 loss to the Columbus Blue Jackets.

Blake made the Hurricanes opening night roster for the 2024–25 season and on October 15, 2024, scored his first NHL goal against the New Jersey Devils. Blake notched 17 goals and added 17 assists for 34 points during his first full professional season. Among NHL rookies, he ranked first in game-winning goals with 6 which tied for the most in team history. Blake appeared in all 15 of the Hurricanes’ Stanley Cup Playoff contests, registering 6 points to rank second among NHL rookies in playoff goals and points.

On July 25, 2025, Blake was re-signed by the Hurricanes to an eight-year, $45 million contract extension, commencing from the 2026–27 season.

== Personal life ==
Blake is the son of former professional ice hockey player Jason Blake.

== International play ==
Medal record

Representing United States

Ice hockey

World Junior Championships
Bronze medal – third place	2023 Canada	

Blake represented the United States at the 2023 World Junior Ice Hockey Championships where he recorded one goal and five assists in seven games and won a bronze medal.

== Career statistics ==
=== Regular season and playoffs ===
			Regular season					Playoffs
Season	Team	League	GP	G	A	Pts	PIM	GP	G	A	Pts	PIM
2020–21	Eden Prairie High	LC	13	14	26	40	16	6	6	12	18	0
2020–21	Chicago Steel	USHL	25	7	10	17	33	8	1	0	1	0
2021–22	Chicago Steel	USHL	61	27	50	77	16	3	1	1	2	0
2022–23	University of North Dakota	NCHC	39	16	26	42	16	—	—	—	—	—
2023–24	University of North Dakota	NCHC	40	22	38	60	26	—	—	—	—	—
2023–24	Carolina Hurricanes	NHL	1	0	0	0	0	—	—	—	—	—
2024–25	Carolina Hurricanes	NHL	80	17	17	34	30	15	3	3	6	16
2025–26	Carolina Hurricanes	NHL	81	22	31	53	40	19	7	13	20	24
NHL totals			162	39	48	87	70	34	10	16	26	40

=== International ===
Year	Team	Event	Result	GP	G	A	Pts	PIM
2023	United States	WJC	3rd place, bronze medalist(s)	7	1	5	6	2
Junior totals				7	1	5	6	2

== Awards and honors ==
Award	Year	Ref
College
All-NCHC Second Team	2023	
All-NCHC Rookie Team	2023	
NCHC Rookie of the Year	2023	
All-NCHC First Team	2024	
NCHC Player of the Year	2024	
NCHC Forward of the Year	2024	
AHCA West First Team All-American	2024	
NHL
Stanley Cup champion	2026	

Awards and achievements
Preceded by Carter Mazur	NCHC Rookie of the Year; 2022–23	Succeeded by Zeev Buium
Preceded by Jason Polin	NCHC Forward of the Year; 2023–24	Succeeded by Alex Bump
Preceded by Jason Polin	NCHC Player of the Year; 2023–24	Succeeded by Zeev Buium
