= Abram Wiebe =

Canadian ice hockey player

- Born: August 28, 2003 (age 23) Mission, British Columbia, Canada
- Height: 6 ft 3 in (191 cm)
- Weight: 209 lb (95 kg; 14 st 13 lb)
- Position: Defence
- Shoots: Left
- NHL team (P) Cur. team: Calgary Flames; Calgary Wranglers (AHL)
- NHL draft: 209th overall, 2022; Vegas Golden Knights
- Playing career: 2026–present

Abram Wiebe (born Aug 28, 2003) is a Canadian professional ice hockey defenceman currently playing for the Calgary Wranglers of the American Hockey League (AHL) as a prospect for the Calgary Flames of the National Hockey League (NHL). Wiebe was selected 209th overall in the seventh round of the 2022 NHL entry draft by the Vegas Golden Knights, and made his NHL debut with the Flames in 2026.

== Playing career ==
Wiebe played junior hockey with the Chilliwack Chiefs of the British Columbia Hockey League (BCHL), serving as captain in his fourth and final season with the team. During the 2022 offseason, Wiebe was selected by the Vegas Golden Knights of the National Hockey League (NHL) in the seventh round of the 2022 NHL entry draft. With Chilliwack, Wiebe made the second BCHL All-Star team for the 2021–22 season and first All-Star team for the 2022–23 season, additionally being named the league's top defenceman in the latter.

Following his time in junior hockey, Wiebe committed to the University of North Dakota of the NCAA's National Collegiate Hockey Conference (NCHC), where he played three seasons. North Dakota won the conference regular season championships in Wiebe's first and third seasons, with Wiebe being named to the NCHC's second All-Conference team in the latter. Following his sophomore season, Wiebe considered signing an entry-level contract with the Golden Knights, but instead opted to return to North Dakota for his junior year. Midway through the 2025–26 season, Wiebe's third and final with North Dakota, his NHL rights were traded by Vegas to the Calgary Flames, as part of a package in exchange for Rasmus Andersson.

Immediately following North Dakota's semifinal elimination in the 2026 NCAA Division I men's ice hockey tournament, Wiebe signed his two-year, entry level contract with Calgary on April 10, 2026, making his NHL debut the following day against the Seattle Kraken. Wiebe ultimately played four games for Calgary before the end of the season, recording two penalty minutes and no points.

Ahead of the 2026–27 season, Wiebe was assigned to the Calgary Wranglers of the American Hockey League (AHL) to begin the year.

== International play ==
Wiebe played for the U.S. Collegiate Selects team in the 2025 Spengler Cup, recording no points in four games. The team ultimately made the finals of the tournament, where they lost 6–3 to HC Davos.

== Career statistics ==
=== Regular season and playoffs ===
			Regular season					Playoffs
Season	Team	League	GP	G	A	Pts	PIM	GP	G	A	Pts	PIM
2019–20	Chilliwack Chiefs	BCHL	3	0	0	0	0	—	—	—	—	—
2020–21	Chilliwack Chiefs	BCHL	20	3	8	11	14	—	—	—	—	—
2021–22	Chilliwack Chiefs	BCHL	54	2	29	31	34	11	0	9	9	8
2022–23	Chilliwack Chiefs	BCHL	54	12	41	53	36	15	2	10	12	12
2023–24	University of North Dakota	NCHC	40	1	9	10	27	—	—	—	—	—
2024–25	University of North Dakota	NCHC	38	4	20	24	24	—	—	—	—	—
2025–26	University of North Dakota	NCHC	40	5	24	29	6	—	—	—	—	—
2025–26	Calgary Flames	NHL	4	0	0	0	2	—	—	—	—	—
NHL totals			4	0	0	0	2	—	—	—	—	—

=== International ===
Year	Team	Event	Result	GP	G	A	Pts	PIM
2025	U.S. Collegiate Selects	SC	2nd place, silver medalist(s)	4	0	0	0	0
Junior totals				4	0	0	0	0

== Awards and honors ==
Award	Year
BCHL
Second All-Star Team	2022
First All-Star Team	2023
Campbell Blair Trophy – Top Defenceman Award	2023
NCAA Division I – NCHC
Second All-Conference Team	2026
