= Jake Livanavage =

American ice hockey player (born 2004)

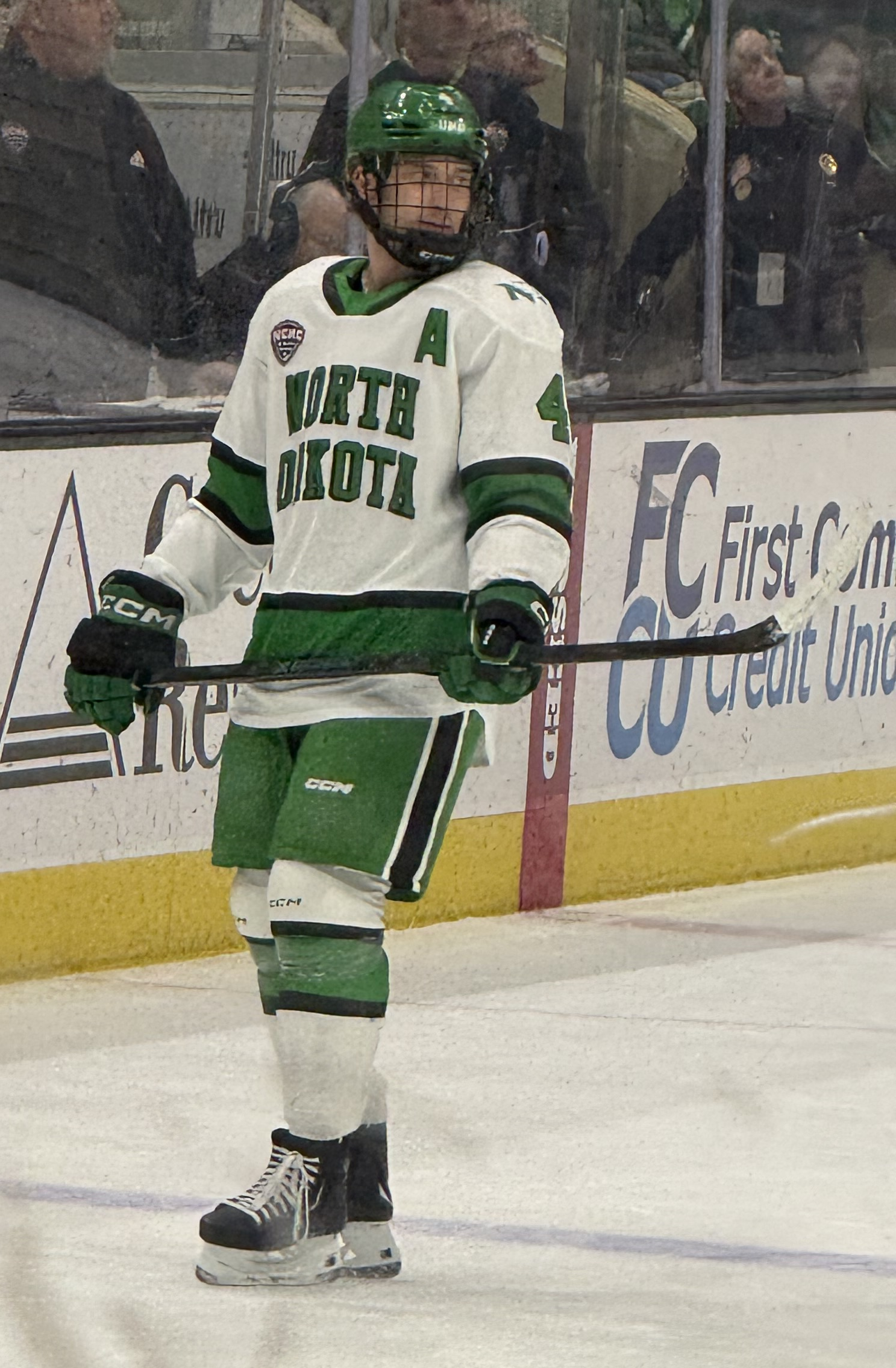
- Livanavage with North Dakota in 2026
- Born: May 6, 2004 (age 22) Gilbert, Arizona, U.S.
- Height: 5 ft 10 in (178 cm)
- Weight: 185 lb (84 kg; 13 st 3 lb)
- Position: Defence
- Shoots: Left
- NHL team (P) Cur. team: Pittsburgh Penguins; WBS Penguins (AHL)
- NHL draft: Undrafted
- Playing career: 2026–present

Jake Livanavage (born May 6, 2004) is an American professional ice hockey defenceman for the Wilkes-Barre/Scranton Penguins of the American Hockey League (AHL) while under contract to the Pittsburgh Penguins of the National Hockey League (NHL). He played collegiate ice hockey for the North Dakota Fighting Hawks.

== Playing career ==
=== Junior ===
Livanavage began his hockey career with the Chicago Steel of the United States Hockey League (USHL), where he recorded ten goals and 80 assists in 152 games over three seasons. He helped the Steel win the Clark Cup in 2021.

=== College ===
Livanavage began his college ice hockey at North Dakota during the 2023–24 season. In his freshman season, he recorded five goals and 24 assists in 40 games. His 29 points were the fourth-most by a rookie defenceman in program history. Following the season he was named to the All-NCHC Rookie Team.

During the 2024–25 season, in his sophomore season, he recorded four goals and 24 assists in 38 games. He averaged 24 minutes, 54 seconds of ice time per game, which led the team. Following the season he was named an AHCA West Second Team All-American.

On March 29, 2025, he announced he would return to North Dakota for his junior season in 2025–26.

=== Professional ===
Livanavage signed a two-year, entry level contract running through the 2026–27 NHL season with the Pittsburgh Penguins on April 10, 2026. Four days later, he made his NHL debut in the Penguins' final regular season game, a 7–5 loss to the St. Louis Blues in which he led all players in ice time and ran Pittsburgh's first power play unit.

Livanavage began the 2026–27 season with the Wilkes-Barre/Scranton Penguins in the American Hockey League. Livanavage was recalled to the Pittsburgh Penguins on November 3, 2026 before being assigned to the WBS Penguins again on November 6.

== Career statistics ==
=== Regular season and playoffs ===
			Regular season					Playoffs
Season	Team	League	GP	G	A	Pts	PIM	GP	G	A	Pts	PIM
2020–21	Chicago Steel	USHL	43	1	8	9	43	7	0	0	0	0
2021–22	Chicago Steel	USHL	61	3	42	45	40	3	0	3	3	0
2022–23	Chicago Steel	USHL	48	6	30	36	65	6	0	3	3	4
2023–24	University of North Dakota	NCHC	40	5	24	29	6	—	—	—	—	—
2024–25	University of North Dakota	NCHC	38	4	24	28	12	—	—	—	—	—
2025–26	University of North Dakota	NCHC	39	5	20	25	10	—	—	—	—	—
2025–26	Pittsburgh Penguins	NHL	1	0	0	0	0	—	—	—	—	—
NHL totals			1	0	0	0	0	—	—	—	—	—

=== International ===
Year	Team	Event	Result	GP	G	A	Pts	PIM
2021	United States	HG18	5th	4	2	2	4	8
Junior totals				4	2	2	4	8

== Awards and honors ==
Award	Year
College
All-NCHC Rookie Team	2024
All-NCHC First Team	2026
AHCA West Second Team All-American	2025
AHCA West First Team All-American	2026
