= NCHC Forward of the Year =

Annual award given out at the conclusion of the National Collegiate Hockey Conference

- Sport: College ice hockey
- League: NCHC

History
- First award: 2014
- Most recent: Max Plante

The NCHC Forward of the Year is an annual award given out at the conclusion of the National Collegiate Hockey Conference regular season to the best forward in the conference as voted by the coaches of each NCHC team.

The Forward of the Year was first awarded in 2014.

== Award winners ==
Year	Winner	Position	School
2013–14	Josh Archibald	Right wing	Omaha
2014–15	Trevor Moore	Left wing	Denver
2015–16	Danton Heinen	Right wing	Denver
2016–17	Anthony Louis	Center	Miami
2017–18	Henrik Borgström	Center	Denver
2018–19	Patrick Newell	Forward	St. Cloud State
2019–20	Jordan Kawaguchi	Forward	North Dakota
2020–21	Shane Pinto	Center	North Dakota
2021–22	Bobby Brink	Right wing	Denver
2022–23	Jason Polin	Right wing	Western Michigan
2023–24	Jackson Blake	Right Wing	North Dakota
2024–25	Alex Bump	Left wing	Western Michigan
2025–26	Max Plante	Center	Minnesota Duluth

=== Winners by school ===
School	Winners
Denver	4
North Dakota	3
Western Michigan	2
Miami	1
Minnesota Duluth	1
Omaha	1
St. Cloud State	1

=== Winners by position ===
Position	Winners
Center	4
Left wing	2
Right wing	5
Forward	2

== See also ==
- NCHC Awards
