= 2024 NCHC Tournament =

2024 NCHC Men's ice hockey tournament
- Dates: March 15–23, 2024
- Teams: 8
- Finals site: Xcel Energy Center; Saint Paul, Minnesota
- Champions: Denver (3rd title)
- Winning coach: David Carle (1st title)
- MVP: McKade Webster (Denver)
- NCHC Men's Ice Hockey Tournaments

The 2024 NCHC Tournament was the 10th tournament in league history. It was played between March 15 and 23, 2024. Quarterfinal games were played at home team campus sites, while the final four matches were held at the Xcel Energy Center in Saint Paul, Minnesota. As the tournament winner, Denver earned the NCHC's automatic bid to the 2024 NCAA Division I men's ice hockey tournament.

== Format ==
The first round of the postseason tournament featured a best-of-three games format. All eight conference teams participated in the tournament. Teams were seeded No. 1 through No. 8 according to their final conference standing, with a tiebreaker system used to seed teams with an identical number of points accumulated. The top four seeded teams each earn home ice and host one of the lower seeded teams.

The winners of the first round series advanced to the Xcel Energy Center for the NCHC Frozen Faceoff. The Frozen Faceoff used a single-elimination format. Teams were re-seeded No. 1 through No. 4 according to the final regular season conference standings.

=== Standings ===
2023–24 National Collegiate Hockey Conference Standings
	Conference record										Overall record					
	GP	W	L	T	OTW	OTL	SW	PTS	GF	GA	GP	W	L	T	GF	GA
#8 North Dakota †	24	15	8	1	1	4	0	49	87	67	40	26	12	2	151	105
#1 Denver *	24	15	7	2	3	0	1	45	110	80	42	30	9	3	198	119
#18 St. Cloud State	24	11	9	4	1	3	2	41	77	74	38	17	16	5	121	114
#15 Colorado College	24	14	8	2	5	2	0	41	66	56	37	21	13	3	111	93
#12 Omaha	24	13	8	3	5	0	3	40	68	74	40	23	13	4	117	112
#14 Western Michigan	24	11	13	0	1	5	0	35	78	64	38	21	16	1	136	97
Minnesota Duluth	24	8	14	2	3	3	2	28	65	80	37	12	20	5	103	125
Miami	24	1	21	2	0	2	0	7	44	100	36	7	26	3	78	135
Championship: March 23, 2024 † indicates conference regular season champion (Penrose Cup) * indicates conference tournament champion (Frozen Faceoff Championship Trophy); Rankings: USCHO.com Top 20 Poll; Updated: April 1, 2024

== Bracket ==
Teams are reseeded for the semifinals.

Quarterfinals; March 15–17
1	North Dakota	5	7	-
8	Miami	1	1	-
2	Denver	4	5	-
7	Minnesota Duluth	0	2	-
3	St. Cloud State	5	1	5
6	Western Michigan	2	6	1
4	Colorado College	4*	1	1
5	Omaha	3	3	2

Semifinals; March 22
1	North Dakota	3
5	Omaha	6
2	Denver	5*
3	St. Cloud State	4

Championship; March 23
5	Omaha	1
2	Denver	4

Note: * denotes overtime period(s)

== Results ==
Note: All game times are local.

=== Quarterfinals ===
==== (1) North Dakota vs. (8) Miami ====
March 15, 2024; 7:07 pm	North Dakota	5–1 (1–0, 2–1, 2–0)	Miami	Ralph Engelstad Arena; Attendance: 11,320

Game reference

Hobie Hedquist
Goalies
Logan Neaton
Referees:
Bobby Lukkason
Sterling Egan
Linesmen:
Tyler Liffrig
Kyle Stephens

(James, Zmolek) Jake Schmaltz (1) – 19:59	1–0
(Pyke, Gaber) Owen McLaughlin (13) – GW – 29:23	2–0
	2–1	30:20 – Ryan Sullivan (5) (Dukovac, Daskas)
(Livanavage, Berg) Riese Gaber (17) – 32:13	3–1
(Kunz) Jackson Blake (20) – 41:48	4–1
(McLaughlin, Blake) Jake Livanavage (4) – 45:13	5–1

21 min
Penalties
9 min
27
Shots
24

March 16, 2024; 6:07 pm	North Dakota	7–1 (1–0, 1–0, 5–1)	Miami	Ralph Engelstad Arena; Attendance: 11,569

Game reference

Hobie Hedquist
Goalies
Logan Neaton
Referees:
Bobby Lukkason
Sterling Egan
Linesmen:
Tyler Liffrig
Kyle Stephens

(unassisted) Riese Gaber (18) – 13:17	1–0
(Blake, Perron) Jackson Kunz (7) – GW PP – 20:37	2–0
(McLaughlin, Kunz) Jackson Blake (21) – 41:38	3–0
(Kunz, Blake) Logan Britt (7) – 44:09	4–0
(Schmaltz, Zmolek) Dylan James (9) – 49:32	5–0
	5–1	51:22 – Artur Turansky (5) (Kumlin, Simanovičs)
(Wiebe, Schmaltz) Ben Strinden (6) – 58:24	6–1
(Perron, Livanavage) Hunter Johannes (10) – 58:52	7–1

8 min
Penalties
12 min
35
Shots
29

North Dakota wins series 2–0

==== (2) Denver vs. (7) Minnesota Duluth ====
March 15, 2024; 7:07 pm	Denver	4–0 (1–0, 2–0, 1–0)	Minnesota Duluth	Magness Arena; Attendance: 5,461

Game reference

Matt Davis
Goalies
Matthew Thiessen
Referees:
Ryan Hersey
Nathan Wieler
Linesmen:
Lucas Bisbee
Chase McGee

(Olvestad, Thompson) McKade Webster (11) – GW – 12:58	1–0
(Harris, Broz) Jack Devine (26) – 33:56	2–0
(Broz, Harris) Jack Devine (27) – 39:38	3–0
(Thompson, Z. Buium) Connor Caponi (11) – EN – 59:43	4–0

8 min
Penalties
8 min
24
Shots
17

March 16, 2024; 6:07 pm	Denver	5–2 (0–0, 3–0, 2–2)	Minnesota Duluth	Magness Arena; Attendance: 6,005

Game reference

Matt Davis
Goalies
Matthew Thiessen
Referees:
Ryan Hersey
Nathan Wieler
Linesmen:
Lucas Bisbee
Chase McGee

(Harris, Behrens) Aidan Thompson (11) – PP – 23:53	1–0
(Wright, Cebrian) Rieger Lorenz (13) – 24:20	2–0
(Broz, Davis) Sean Behrens (4) – GW – 34:02	3–0
	3–1	47:00 – PP – Luke Loheit (10) (Gallatin, Bettens)
	3–2	57:56 – EA – Kyle Bettens (6) (Biondi, Gallatin)
(Devine) Tristan Broz (14) – EN – 58:47	4–2
(Wright) Rieger Lorenz (14) – EN – 59:38	5–2

8 min
Penalties
22 min
30
Shots
30

Denver wins series 2–0

==== (3) St. Cloud State vs. (6) Western Michigan ====
March 15, 2024; 7:37 pm	St. Cloud State	5–2 (1–0, 1–0, 3–2)	Western Michigan	Herb Brooks National Hockey Center; Attendance: 3,026

Game reference

Isak Posch
Goalies
Cameron Rowe
Referees:
Brian Hawkes
Stephen Reneau
Linesmen:
Dana Penkivech
Jeff Schultz

(Luedtke, Hall) Jack Rogers (3) – 11:22	1–0
(Anhorn, Ingram) Tyson Gross (6) – 29:33	2–0
(Peart, Gross) Veeti Miettinen (17) – GW SH – 47:14	3–0
	3–1	48:45 – Alex Bump (12) (Grainger, Colangelo)
	3–2	50:44 – Alex Bump (13) (Sjolund, Berger)
(Ver. Miettinen, Peart) Mason Salquist (7) – PP – 58:24	4–2
(Ver. Miettinen, Salquist) Josh Luedtke (3) – PP – 57:15	5–2

8 min
Penalties
19 min
30
Shots
28

March 16, 2024; 6:07 pm	St. Cloud State	1–6 (0–0, 1–1, 0–5)	Western Michigan	Herb Brooks National Hockey Center; Attendance: 2,495

Game reference

Isak Posch
Goalies
Cameron Rowe
Referees:
Brian Hawkes
Stephen Reneau
Linesmen:
Dana Penkivech
Jeff Schultz

(Kupka, Anhorn) Tyson Gross (7) – 27:12	1–0
	1–1	37:02 – Sam Colangelo (21) (Bump, Fiedler)
	1–2	41:56 – GW PP – Dylan Wendt (22) (Bump, Grainger)
	1–3	52:04 – PP – Luke Grainger (14) (Wendt, Sjolund)
	1–4	57:24 – Sam Colangelo (22) (Bump, Grainger)
	1–5	58:16 – EN – Sam Colangelo (23) (Galambos, Washe)
	1–6	59:44 – Dylan Wendt (23) (Crusberg-Roseen, Costantini)

24 min
Penalties
20 min
16
Shots
40

March 17, 2024; 6:07 pm	St. Cloud State	5–1 (3–1, 2–0, 0–0)	Western Michigan	Herb Brooks National Hockey Center; Attendance: —

Game reference

Isak Posch
Goalies
Cameron Rowe
Referees:
Brian Hawkes
Stephen Reneau
Linesmen:
Dana Penkivech
Jeff Schultz

(Gross, Kupka) Veeti Miettinen (19) – 3:27	1–0
(Hall, Luedtke) Jack Rogers (4) – GW – 9:10	2–0
(Salquist) Barrett Hall (7) – 11:17	3–0
	3–1	11:36 – Matteo Costantini (12) (Wendt, Hillebrand)
(Gross, Kupka) Veeti Miettinen (20) – PP – 22:41	4–1
(AuCoin, Rosborough) Josh Luedtke (4) – 36:49	5–1

14 min
Penalties
21 min
25
Shots
33

St. Cloud State wins series 2–1

==== (4) Colorado College vs. (5) Omaha ====
March 15, 2024; 7:07 pm	Colorado College	4–3 (OT) (0–0, 1–3, 2–0, 1–0)	Omaha	Ed Robson Arena; Attendance: 3,410

Game reference

Kaidan Mbereko
Goalies
Simon Latkoczy
Referees:
Nick Krebsbach
Brandon Schmitt
Linesmen:
Erik Contino
Dylan Peper

	0–1	25:30 – Ty Mueller (4) (G. Ludtke)
	0–2	25:51 – Jack Randl (13) (Lemay, T. Ludtke)
	0–3	33:24 – Jacob Slipec (2) (Guévin)
(Werner, Veremyev) Chase Foley (1) – PP – 34:13	1–3
(Wisdom, Andrews) Klavs Veinbergs (3) – PP – 49:15	2–3
(Veremyev, Link) Noah Laba (20) – EA – 59:10	3–3
(Wisdom, Foley) Gleb Veremyev (15) – GW – 71:53	4–3

2 min
Penalties
17 min
50
Shots
15

March 16, 2024; 6:07 pm	Colorado College	1–3 (1–2, 0–0, 0–1)	Omaha	Ed Robson Arena; Attendance: 3,425

Game reference

Kaidan Mbereko
Goalies
Simon Latkoczy
Referees:
Nick Krebsbach
Brandon Schmitt
Linesmen:
Erik Contino
Dylan Peper

	0–1	3:13 – Tanner Ludtke (11) (G. Ludtke, Miller)
(Werner) Chase Foley (2) – 7:17	1–1
	1–2	16:46 – GW – Jimmy Glynn (7) (Proctor, Bremer)
	1–3	47:37 – Brock Bremer (5) (T. Ludtke, Sullivan)

4 min
Penalties
6 min
40
Shots
21

March 17, 2024; 6:07 pm	Colorado College	1–2 (1–0, 0–1, 0–1)	Omaha	Ed Robson Arena; Attendance: 3,416

Game reference

Kaidan Mbereko
Goalies
Simon Latkoczy
Referees:
Nick Krebsbach
Brandon Schmitt
Linesmen:
Erik Contino
Dylan Peper

(Laba, Werner) Klavs Veinbergs (4) – PP – 15:34	1–0
	1–1	37:20 – Jimmy Glynn (11) (Lansdell, Bremer)
	1–2	46:39 – GW – Brock Bremer (6) (G. Ludtke)

2 min
Penalties
4 min
32
Shots
22

Omaha wins series 2–1

=== Semifinals ===
==== (1) North Dakota vs. (5) Omaha ====
March 22, 2024; 4:07 pm	North Dakota	3–6 (1–1, 1–2, 1–3)	Omaha	Xcel Energy Center; Attendance: 8,977

Game reference

Hobie Hedquist
Goalies
Simon Latkoczy
Referees:
Sterling Egan
Brian Hankes
Linesmen:
Jeff Schultz
Dana Penkivech

(Blake, McLaughlin) Jackson Kunz (8) – 1:18	1–0
	1–1	18:30 – PP – Zach Urdahl (11) (Lansdell, Guévin)
	1–2	26:17 – Matt Miller (7) (Urdahl, Sullivan)
	1–3	37:06 – Jimmy Glynn (9) (G. Ludtke, Lansdell)
(Strinden, Britt) Hunter Johannes (11) – 39:36	2–3
	2–4	41:18 – GW – Brock Bremer (7) (Lansdell, Krenzen)
(Berg, Blake) Jake Livanavage (5) – PP – 49:50	3–4
	3–5	50:58 – Zach Urdahl (12) (G. Ludtke, Miller)
	3–6	55:16 – EN – Zach Urdahl (13) (Sullivan, G. Ludtke)

6 min
Penalties
12 min
39
Shots
35

==== (2) Denver vs. (3) St. Cloud State ====
March 22, 2024; 7:37 pm	Denver	5–4 (OT) (2–2, 2–2, 0–0, 1–0)	St. Cloud State	Xcel Energy Center; Attendance: 8,977

Game reference

Matt Davis
Goalies
Isak Posch
Referees:
Brandon Schmitt
Nick Krebsbach
Linesmen:
Eric Frank
Sam Rankin

	0–1	1:40 – Cooper Wylie (3) (unassisted)
(Lorenz, Cebrian) Zeev Buium (10) – 8:38	1–1
	1–2	9:55 – Nick Portz (2) (Rosborough)
(Thompson) McKade Webster (12) – 17:16	2–2
	2–3	21:00 – Adam Ingram (10) (Ver. Miettinen, Okabe)
(S. Buium, Z. Buium) Miko Matikka (17) – PP – 25:30	3–3
	3–4	28:06 – PP – Barrett Hall (7) (Kupka, Anhorn)
(S. Buium, Thompson) Miko Matikka (18) – 38:17	4–4
(Harris) Zeev Buium (11) – GW – 66:21	5–4

2 min
Penalties
7 min
41
Shots
25

=== Championship ===
==== (2) Denver vs. (5) Omaha ====
March 23, 2024; 7:30 pm	Denver	4–1 (0–1, 2–0, 2–0)	Omaha	Xcel Energy Center; Attendance: 6,929

Game reference

Matt Davis
Goalies
Simon Latkoczy
Referees:
Ryan Hersey
Nathan Wieler
Linesmen:
Tyler Liffrig
Erik Contino

	0–1	13:56 – Brock Bremer (8) (Proctor)
(Matikka) McKade Webster (13) – 21:33	1–1
(Buckberger, S. Buium) McKade Webster (14) – GW – 24:54	2–1
(Devine, Z. Buium) Miko Matikka (19) – EA – 55:50	3–1
(Wright) Rieger Lorenz (15) – 58:00	4–1

6 min
Penalties
10 min
35
Shots
16

== Tournament awards ==
=== Frozen Faceoff All-Tournament Team ===
- G: Šimon Latkoczy (Omaha)
- D: Zeev Buium (Denver)
- D: Griffin Ludtke (Omaha)
- F: McKade Webster * (Denver)
- F: Zach Urdahl (Omaha)
- F: Miko Matikka (Denver)

* Most Valuable Player(s)
