= 2023–24 Denver Pioneers men's ice hockey season =

Collegiate team season

NCAA Division I National Champion NCHC Tournament, Champion NCAA Tournament, Champion
- Conference: 2nd NCHC
- Home ice: Magness Arena

Rankings
- USCHO: #1
- USA Hockey: #1

Record
- Overall: 32–9–3
- Conference: 15–7–2
- Home: 14–3–3
- Road: 12–6–0
- Neutral: 6–0–0

Coaches and captains
- Head coach: David Carle
- Assistant coaches: Tavis MacMillan; Dallas Ferguson; Ryan Massa
- Captain: McKade Webster
- Alternate captains: Connor Caponi; Carter King; Massimo Rizzo

The 2023–24 Denver Pioneers men's ice hockey season was the 75th season of play for the program and 11th in the NCHC. The Pioneers represented the University of Denver in the 2023–24 NCAA Division I men's ice hockey season, played their home games at Magness Arena and were coached by David Carle in his sixth season. The team won the 2024 NCAA Division I men's ice hockey tournament for their NCAA record tenth national championship.

== Season ==
=== Personnel changes ===
As Denver entered the season, the team saw very few changes to its forward contingent. With only two of its top ten point producers leaving, the Pioneers returned most of their firepower from the year before. To that already potent roster, Denver added two NHL draft picks in Sam Harris and Miko Matikka. The defense was a little more uncertain; Denver lost half of its defensive corps and would have to rely on some very green additions to take over. However, through the new pieces were as yet unproven, one had already been selected in the draft while another was expected to be a very high pick at the end of the season. Zeev Buium, younger brother of Pioneer defenseman Shai Buium, was ranked in the top 5 of North American skaters by NHL Central Scouting and promised to add speed and scoring to the Denver blueline. In goal, the team was expecting to use last year's backup, Matt Davis as the starter, though he had some large shoes to fill in replacing 4-year starter Magnus Chrona.

=== Questions in goal ===
From the start, Denver didn't seem to have any trouble scoring. Averaging nearly 5 goals per game in October, the Pios were led by the forward tandem of Massimo Rizzo and Jack Devine with Zeev Buium jumping in from the blueline. Davis, however, had a little trouble getting up to speed and didn't look ready for the starting job. After surrendering 5 goals to Augustana, a 1st-year program, Davis was put on the shelf with a lower-body injury. Denver turned to freshman netminder Freddie Halyk to hold the fort and the early returns looked good. In his first three games, Halyk allowed just 2 goals and swept long-time rival Colorado College in the first meeting of the season. Unfortunately, Arizona State was able to figure out Halyk and score 10 goals on the young netminder in the very next weekend.

After that series, the injury bug bit again and Denver lost Garrett Brown for the remainder of the season after the defenseman underwent surgery to correct a lower body issue. After another less than-stellar weekend, David Carle brought in another netminder, Paxton Geisel, to help take some of the pressure off of Halyk. That same weekend, Denver experienced a rare event where a game took nearly 24 hours to complete. The match against Omaha on November 18 was halted after the first period due to poor ice conditions. A patch of ice behind the Denver net didn't freeze properly and after attempting to address the problem for over an hour, the game was postponed until the following day. Because an entire period had already been played, the game resumed at the start of the second.

During the Thanksgiving weekend, Halyk posted consecutive shutouts but that was more to the weakness of the team's opponent (Yale) than it was to improved play in goal. As if to illustrate that point, North Dakota lit up Halyk with 7 goals in the next game. Denver was able to use its powerful offense to escape tumbling down the rankings as it finished off the first half of the schedule but the team found itself in the middle of the NCHC standings and needing better results in goal if the team had any hope of realizing its championship aspirations.

=== Davis returns ===
After missing over two months of actions, Matt Davis was back in goal at the start of 2024. With the Pioneers scoring in bunches, Davis was able to ease his way back into game shape and Denver began the second half of its schedule by winning five of six. The team was stymied at the end of January when North Dakota held the Pios to 2 goals in each of the two games (the first time all season that Denver had not scored at least 3 goals in a game). The losses all but guaranteed that Denver wouldn't be able to win the regular season title but the team had bigger fish to fry and were looking to secure one of the four #1 seeds in the NCAA tournament.

In a bad loss to Western Michigan, Rizzo went down to injury and it was unknown if he would return before the end of the season. In the absence of the team's leading scorer, Tristan Broz was promoted to the top line and the team used their two-week break to refocus. When the Pioneers resumed, Davis finally seemed to get comfortable in goal and backstopped the team to a good finish. Denver went 6–1–1 down the stretch and scored at nearly the same rate as they had before losing Rizzo. The Pioneers ended the regular season #3 in the pairwise in a tie with UND.

=== NCHC tournament ===
Denver's opponent in the conference quarter finals was Minnesota Duluth, who were in the midst of a terrible season. The Pios were able to easily handle the Bulldogs in the first game and looked ready to do the same in the rematch. After Denver scored three goals in the second, UMD made things interesting by getting a pair in the third. Broz and Rieger Lorenz ended the comeback attempt with empty-net goals and allowed the Pioneers to advance to Saint Paul.

Now facing St. Cloud State, Davis had a fairly poor night and allowed 4 goals on just 25 shots. St. Cloud got in the lead four times but each Husky goal was followed by one from the Pioneers. The two teams each scored twice in the first two periods but then went dry in the third. In overtime, the two teams were fairly even through the first 6 minutes, however, Zeev Buium continued to earn his plaudits when he got a break in on goal from the blueline, avoided two defenders, and slid the puck around the St. Cloud goaltender for the winning marker.

Denver was able to get a bit of good news prior to the championship as North Dakota had lost in the other semifinal, meaning that Denver was guaranteed to finish ahead of the Hawks in the PairWise. With a #1 seed now guaranteed, Denver met Omaha for the conference title. Early on, it appeared that the Pioneers would fall victim to the same thing that befell North Dakota; despite outplaying the Mavericks, Denver was held scoreless in the first thanks to a tremendous effort in goal from the Omaha netminder. The Pios were trailing entering the second but it didn't take long for McKade Webster to change that. Before 5 minutes had passed, the team's captain had scored twice and altered the complexion of the game. Omaha could no longer hold back and wait for their chances but they were still having trouble getting shots on goal. Denver suffocated the Mavs in the third, allowing only 3 shots on Davis while adding two more goal to their total to skate away with the championship and the #3 overall seed for the NCAA tournament.

=== NCAA tournament ===
While Denver was the top seed from the western teams, a confluence of NCAA rules caused the Pioneers to be placed in the Northeast region. Not only did the team open the tournament 1,800 miles from home, but they were set against the bracket's host, Massachusetts. Playing in front of a hostile crowd, Denver had to fight through an inspired performance from the Minutemen and found it very difficult to score. Boston Buckberger got Denver the first lead of the game in the second but it didn't last long. In a sequence where Davis made a series of saves, but wasn't able to freeze the puck, UMass tied the match off of a second rebound. The Pioneers had several chances to score afterwards but weren't able to light the lamp and their season was only kept alive by the brilliant play of Davis. Both teams had their chances in overtime, with Devine failing to convert on multiple opportunities, but neither could find the net. with about 90 seconds left in the first OT, Denver avoided disaster when Davis tried to stop the puck behind his cage. Instead, the rubber was deflected to an oncoming UMass player who passed to a wide-open teammate right in front of the vacant net. Denver was only saved by the puck hopping over his stick when he went to shoot and their title chase remained alive. The game went into a fifth period and both sides continued to probe at one another, looking for the elusive game-winner. In the second half of the period, Broz fired a shot from the high slot and it sailed just past the outstretched glove of the Massachusetts goalie into the cage. Harris had made contact with the netminder prior to the goal and it was reviewed for interference but the officials deemed that Harris had been pushed in by a UMass defender and the goal was allowed to stand.

In the regional final, Denver was opposed by Cornell, the #1 defense in the nation. With the goals expected to be at a premium, the Pioneers would again need a big game from Davis. However, less than 7 minutes into the game, Denver found itself behind thanks to a scramble that was reminiscent of the lone goal from UMass. Cornell's stingy defense put the clamps on Denver through the entire game and limited the Pios to just 18 shots on goal, however, one of the few turnovers in the Big Red's defensive end resulted in a quick goal when Matikka fired in his 20th of the season near the end of the first. Davis was able to turn aside all further Cornell attempts and allow his team to take advantage of a second Cornell blunder when they got their first power play of the match. With just 4 seconds left in the middle frame, Harris was able to tip a shot through the legs of the Cornell netminder and it had just enough pace to slide into the goal. Denver played defense for nearly the entire third period, trying to win a 1-goal game. The play proved to be dangerous as Cornell had several good looks on goal but their chances either failed to connect or were stopped by Davis. Denver became the beneficiary of a second cornell penalty with two and half minutes to play that disrupted the comeback attempt. When the Big Red were finally able to pull their goaltender for an extra attacker, just 30 seconds remained in the match and Denver managed to hold off Cornell for the final buzzer.

As the team got ready for their appearance in the Frozen Four, Denver got a boost with the return of Rizzo to the lineup. For the second game in a row, Denver got behind early, this time by allowing a goal while on the power play. Fortunately, Davis recovered quickly and didn't surrender a goal for the rest of the game. Just past the midway point of regulation, the Pioneers got a gift when Tristan Lemyre scored just his second goal of the season on a shot in tight that leaked through the Boston University netminder. Denver had been thoroughly outplayed prior to the goal but then took over for much of the next 30 minutes. Unfortunately, the Pioneers were unable to earn a second marker and needed overtime to settle the score. Luck continued to follow the Pioneers who did not once find themselves on the penalty kill in the match, despite several instances where calls could have been made. In the extra session alone, two non-calls that drew moans from the crowd went unnoticed by the referees. Just after the second such act, Broz rushed the puck up the ice and just as he got to the top of the right circle, fired a shot that went right between the legs of the CU netminder for the winning goal.

==== National Championship ====
With the championship now in their sight, Denver only had to overcome the #1 team in the nation, Boston College. Unlike the previous two games, the Pioneers did not allow an early goal and instead played a soud defensive game against the nation's #2 offense. Denver limited BC's chances in the first two periods and held the Eagles to just 12 shots on goal. The Pioneers, on the other hand, got more than that in the second period, which was when Jared Wright opened the scoring by bouncing the puck into the goal off of both the post and the back of the opposing netminder. About 5 minutes later, a tremendous pass from Zeev Buium resulted in a goal from Lorenz and Denver doubled its lead. With BC down by a pair entering the third, the Eagles' offense finally woke up and besieged the Denver cage for the rest of the game. Boston College put 23 shots on goal in the third period, but Davis saved his best performance for last and looked at ease despite the heavy workload. Even during a power play from the #2 group in the nation that produced chance after chance, Davis was unbeatable and nothing was able to get past the Pioneer netminder. The longer the Eagles went scoreless the more desperate they became and the more they pressured the Denver cage. In the end, however, their score went unchanged and Denver was able to skate away with the 10th National Championship in program history.

== Departures ==
| Player | Position | Nationality | Cause |
|---|---|---|---|
| Michael Benning | Defenseman | Canada | Signed professional contract (Florida Panthers) |
| Magnus Chrona | Goaltender | Sweden | Graduation (signed with San Jose Sharks) |
| Casey Dornbach | Forward | United States | Graduation (signed with Iowa Wild) |
| Brett Edwards | Forward | Canada | Graduate transfer to Northeastern |
| Tyler Haskins | Forward | United States | Transferred to Minnesota State |
| Lane Krenzen | Defenseman | United States | Graduate transfer to Omaha |
| Justin Lee | Defenseman | Canada | Graduation (signed with Wilkes-Barre/Scranton Penguins) |
| Kyle Mayhew | Defenseman | United States | Graduation (signed with Colorado Eagles) |
| Carter Mazur | Forward | United States | Signed professional contract (Detroit Red Wings) |
| Owen Ozar | Forward | Canada | Transferred to Bowling Green |

== Recruiting ==
| Player | Position | Nationality | Age | Notes |
|---|---|---|---|---|
| Cale Ashcroft | Defenseman | Canada | 19 | Calgary, AB |
| Garrett Brown | Defenseman | United States | 19 | San Jose, CA; selected 99th overall in 2022 |
| Boston Buckberger | Defenseman | United States | 20 | Saskatoon, SK |
| Zeev Buium | Defenseman | United States | 17 | Laguna Niguel, CA |
| Kieran Cebrian | Forward | United States | 20 | Denver, CO |
| Freddie Halyk | Goaltender | Canada | 20 | Cochrane, AB |
| Sam Harris | Forward | United States | 19 | San Diego, CA; selected 133rd overall in 2023 |
| Peter Lajoy | Forward | United States | 21 | Evergreen, CO |
| Miko Matikka | Forward | Finland | 19 | Helsinki, FIN; selected 67th overall in 2022 |
| Paxton Geisel | Goaltender | Canada | 18 | Estevan, SK; joined mid-season |
| Alex Weiermair | Forward | United States | 18 | Los Angeles, CA |

== Roster ==
As of September 27, 2023.

| No. | Nat. | Player | Class | Pos | Height | Weight | DoB | Hometown | Previous team | NHL rights |
|---|---|---|---|---|---|---|---|---|---|---|
| 1 | (Canada) | Freddie Halyk | Freshman | G | 6' 5" (1.96 m) | 210 lb (95 kg) | 2003-08-27 | Cochrane, Alberta | Camrose Kodiaks (AJHL) | — |
| 2 | (United States) | Sean Behrens | Junior | D | 5' 9" (1.75 m) | 178 lb (81 kg) | 2003-03-31 | Barrington, Illinois | USNTDP (USHL) | COL, 61st overall 2021 |
| 3 | (Canada) | Cale Ashcroft | Freshman | D | 5' 11" (1.8 m) | 190 lb (86 kg) | 2004-08-05 | St. Albert, Alberta | Tri-City Storm (USHL) | — |
| 4 | (United States) | Jack Devine | Junior | F | 5' 11" (1.8 m) | 175 lb (79 kg) | 2003-10-02 | Glencoe, Illinois | USNTDP (USHL) | FLA, 221st overall 2022 |
| 5 | (United States) | Garrett Brown | Freshman | D | 6' 3" (1.91 m) | 200 lb (91 kg) | 2004-04-04 | San Jose, California | Waterloo Black Hawks (USHL) | WPG, 99th overall 2022 |
| 6 | (United States) | McKade Webster (C) | Senior | F | 5' 10" (1.78 m) | 175 lb (79 kg) | 2000-07-28 | St. Louis, Missouri | Green Bay Gamblers (USHL) | TBL, 213th overall 2019 |
| 7 | (United States) | Aidan Thompson | Sophomore | F | 5' 11" (1.8 m) | 170 lb (77 kg) | 2002-02-18 | Fort Collins, Colorado | Lincoln Stars (USHL) | CHI, 90th overall 2022 |
| 8 | (United States) | Shai Buium | Junior | D | 6' 3" (1.91 m) | 220 lb (100 kg) | 2003-03-26 | San Diego, California | Sioux City Musketeers (USHL) | DET, 36th overall 2021 |
| 9 | (Canada) | Boston Buckberger | Freshman | D | 5' 11" (1.8 m) | 180 lb (82 kg) | 2003-06-01 | Saskatoon, Saskatchewan | Lincoln Stars (USHL) | — |
| 10 | (Finland) | Miko Matikka | Freshman | F | 6' 4" (1.93 m) | 200 lb (91 kg) | 2003-10-26 | Helsinki, Finland | Waterloo Black Hawks (USHL) | ARI, 67th overall 2022 |
| 11 | (Sweden) | Lucas Ölvestad | Sophomore | D | 6' 1" (1.85 m) | 190 lb (86 kg) | 2002-03-19 | Stockholm, Sweden | Dubuque Fighting Saints (USHL) | — |
| 12 | (United States) | Sam Harris | Freshman | F | 6' 1" (1.85 m) | 190 lb (86 kg) | 2003-10-14 | San Diego, California | Sioux Falls Stampede (USHL) | MTL, 133rd overall 2023 |
| 13 | (Canada) | Massimo Rizzo (A) | Junior | F | 5' 11" (1.8 m) | 178 lb (81 kg) | 2001-06-13 | Burnaby, British Columbia | Coquitlam Express (BCHL) | PHI, 216th overall 2019 |
| 14 | (Canada) | Rieger Lorenz | Sophomore | F | 6' 2" (1.88 m) | 192 lb (87 kg) | 2004-03-30 | Calgary, Alberta | Okotoks Oilers (AJHL) | MIN, 56th overall 2022 |
| 15 | (Canada) | Carter King (A) | Junior | F | 5' 10" (1.78 m) | 185 lb (84 kg) | 2001-08-30 | Calgary, Alberta | Surrey Eagles (BCHL) | — |
| 16 | (United States) | Tristan Broz | Junior | F | 6' 0" (1.83 m) | 183 lb (83 kg) | 2002-10-10 | Bloomington, Minnesota | Minnesota (Big Ten) | PIT, 58th overall 2021 |
| 17 | (United States) | Peter LaJoy | Freshman | F | 5' 7" (1.7 m) | 165 lb (75 kg) | 2002-02-27 | Evergreen, Colorado | Danbury Jr. Hat Tricks (NAHL) | — |
| 18 | (United States) | Jared Wright | Sophomore | F | 6' 2" (1.88 m) | 176 lb (80 kg) | 2002-11-22 | Burnsville, Minnesota | Omaha Lancers (USHL) | LAK, 169th overall 2022 |
| 21 | (Canada) | Kent Anderson | Sophomore | D | 6' 3" (1.91 m) | 205 lb (93 kg) | 2003-11-13 | Calgary, Alberta | Green Bay Gamblers (USHL) | — |
| 22 | (United States) | Connor Caponi (A) | Senior | F | 5' 9" (1.75 m) | 186 lb (84 kg) | 2000-03-20 | Milwaukee, Wisconsin | Waterloo Black Hawks (USHL) | — |
| 24 | (United States) | Kieran Cebrian | Freshman | F | 6' 2" (1.88 m) | 195 lb (88 kg) | 2003-03-31 | Denver, Colorado | Tri-City Storm (USHL) | — |
| 28 | (United States) | Zeev Buium | Freshman | D | 6' 2" (1.88 m) | 180 lb (82 kg) | 2005-12-07 | Laguna Niguel, California | USNTDP (USHL) | — |
| 29 | (Canada) | Tristan Lemyre | Sophomore | F | 5' 9" (1.75 m) | 170 lb (77 kg) | 2001-01-15 | Mirabel, Quebec | Dubuque Fighting Saints (USHL) | — |
| 30 | (Canada) | Paxton Geisel | Freshman | G | 6' 1" (1.85 m) | 190 lb (86 kg) | 2004-01-18 | Estevan, Saskatchewan | Muskegon Lumberjacks (USHL) | — |
| 31 | (United States) | Jack Caruso | Senior | G | 5' 9" (1.75 m) | 187 lb (85 kg) | 1999-06-07 | St. Louis, Missouri | Fairbanks Ice Dogs (NAHL) | — |
| 35 | (Canada) | Matt Davis | Junior | G | 6' 0" (1.83 m) | 179 lb (81 kg) | 2001-06-16 | Calgary, Alberta | Green Bay Gamblers (USHL) | — |
| 39 | (United States) | Alex Weiermair | Freshman | F | 6' 1" (1.85 m) | 190 lb (86 kg) | 2005-05-10 | Los Angeles, California | USNTDP (USHL) | — |

== Standings ==
2023–24 National Collegiate Hockey Conference Standings
| | Conference record | | | | | | | | | | Overall record | | | | | |
| | GP | W | L | T | OTW | OTL | SW | PTS | GF | GA | GP | W | L | T | GF | GA |
|---|---|---|---|---|---|---|---|---|---|---|---|---|---|---|---|---|
| #8 North Dakota † | 24 | 15 | 8 | 1 | 1 | 4 | 0 | 49 | 87 | 67 | 40 | 26 | 12 | 2 | 151 | 105 |
| #1 Denver * | 24 | 15 | 7 | 2 | 3 | 0 | 1 | 45 | 110 | 80 | 44 | 32 | 9 | 3 | 202 | 120 |
| #18 St. Cloud State | 24 | 11 | 9 | 4 | 1 | 3 | 2 | 41 | 77 | 74 | 38 | 17 | 16 | 5 | 121 | 114 |
| #15 Colorado College | 24 | 14 | 8 | 2 | 5 | 2 | 0 | 41 | 66 | 56 | 37 | 21 | 13 | 3 | 111 | 93 |
| #12 Omaha | 24 | 13 | 8 | 3 | 5 | 0 | 3 | 40 | 68 | 74 | 40 | 23 | 13 | 4 | 117 | 112 |
| #14 Western Michigan | 24 | 11 | 13 | 0 | 1 | 5 | 0 | 35 | 78 | 64 | 38 | 21 | 16 | 1 | 136 | 97 |
| Minnesota Duluth | 24 | 8 | 14 | 2 | 3 | 3 | 2 | 28 | 65 | 80 | 37 | 12 | 20 | 5 | 103 | 125 |
| Miami | 24 | 1 | 21 | 2 | 0 | 2 | 0 | 7 | 44 | 100 | 36 | 7 | 26 | 3 | 78 | 135 |
Championship: March 23, 2024 † indicates conference regular season champion (Penrose Cup) * indicates conference tournament champion (Frozen Faceoff Championship Trophy); Rankings: USCHO.com Top 20 Poll; Updated: April 1, 2024

== Schedule and results ==
| Date | Time | Opponent^{#} | Rank^{#} | Site | TV | Decision | Result | Attendance | Record |
Regular Season
| October 7 | 9:07 pm | at Alaska* | #4 | Carlson Center • Fairbanks, Alaska | FloHockey | Davis | W 7–3 | 1,962 | 1–0–0 |
| October 8 | 7:07 pm | at Alaska* | #4 | Carlson Center • Fairbanks, Alaska | FloHockey | Davis | W 5–2 | 1,421 | 2–0–0 |
| October 20 | 7:00 pm | at #10 Providence* | #2 | Schneider Arena • Providence, Rhode Island | ESPN+ | Davis | L 3–4 | 3,465 | 2–1–0 |
| October 21 | 7:00 pm | at #3 Boston College* | #2 | Conte Forum • Chestnut Hill, Massachusetts | ESPN+ | Davis | W 4–3 | 7,884 | 3–1–0 |
| October 27 | 7:00 pm | Augustana* | #2 | Magness Arena • Denver, Colorado | | Davis | T 5–5 | 5,343 | 3–1–1 |
| October 28 | 6:00 pm | Air Force* | #2 | Magness Arena • Denver, Colorado | | Halyk | W 4–0 | 6,278 | 4–1–1 |
| November 3 | 7:00 pm | Colorado College | #2 | Magness Arena • Denver, Colorado (Rivalry) | | Halyk | W 6–1 | 7,021 | 5–1–1 (1–0–0) |
| November 4 | 6:00 pm | at Colorado College | #2 | Ed Robson Arena • Colorado Springs, Colorado (Rivalry) | SOCO CW | Halyk | W 5–1 | 3,749 | 6–1–1 (2–0–0) |
| November 10 | 7:00 pm | at #16 Arizona State* | #2 | Mullett Arena • Tempe, Arizona | | Halyk | L 5–6 ^{OT} | 5,102 | 6–2–1 |
| November 11 | 5:00 pm | at #16 Arizona State* | #2 | Mullett Arena • Tempe, Arizona | | Halyk | W 8–4 | 4,996 | 7–2–1 |
| November 17 | 7:00 pm | Omaha | #3 | Magness Arena • Denver, Colorado | | Halyk | W 8–4 | 5,940 | 8–2–1 (3–0–0) |
| November 18 / 19 | 6:00 pm / 2:00 pm | Omaha | #3 | Magness Arena • Denver, Colorado | | Halyk | L 3–4 | 5,813 | 8–3–1 (3–1–0) |
| November 24 | 7:00 pm | Yale* | #4 | Magness Arena • Denver, Colorado | | Halyk | W 5–0 | 5,817 | 9–3–1 |
| November 25 | 6:00 pm | Yale* | #4 | Magness Arena • Denver, Colorado | | Halyk | W 9–0 | 5,823 | 10–3–1 |
| December 1 | 7:00 pm | #2 North Dakota | #3 | Magness Arena • Denver, Colorado (Rivalry) | | Halyk | L 5–7 | 5,958 | 10–4–1 (3–2–0) |
| December 2 | 6:00 pm | #2 North Dakota | #3 | Magness Arena • Denver, Colorado (Rivalry) | | Halyk | W 3–2 ^{OT} | 6,136 | 11–4–1 (4–2–0) |
| December 8 | 5:00 pm | at #13 Western Michigan | #4 | Lawson Arena • Kalamazoo, Michigan | | Halyk | L 3–7 | 3,558 | 11–5–1 (4–3–0) |
| December 9 | 4:00 pm | at #13 Western Michigan | #4 | Lawson Arena • Kalamazoo, Michigan | | Geisel | W 6–5 ^{OT} | 3,791 | 12–5–1 (5–3–0) |
| December 29 | 6:00 pm | Minot State* | #5 | Magness Arena • Denver, Colorado (Exhibition) | | Halyk | W 9–3 | 6,370 | |
| January 5 | 7:00 pm | Niagara* | #6 | Magness Arena • Denver, Colorado | | Davis | W 5–2 | 5,854 | 13–5–1 |
| January 6 | 6:00 pm | Niagara* | #6 | Magness Arena • Denver, Colorado | | Davis | W 6–1 | 6,255 | 14–5–1 |
| January 12 | 7:00 pm | #14 St. Cloud State | #6 | Magness Arena • Denver, Colorado | CBSSN | Davis | W 5–1 | 6,372 | 15–5–1 (6–3–0) |
| January 13 | 6:00 pm | #14 St. Cloud State | #6 | Magness Arena • Denver, Colorado | | Davis | T 4–4 ^{SOL} | 6,201 | 15–5–2 (6–3–1) |
| January 19 | 6:00 pm | at #19 Omaha | #5 | Baxter Arena • Omaha, Nebraska | | Davis | W 6–3 | 7,391 | 16–5–2 (7–3–1) |
| January 20 | 6:00 pm | at #19 Omaha | #5 | Baxter Arena • Omaha, Nebraska | | Davis | W 6–2 | 6,898 | 17–5–2 (8–3–1) |
| January 26 | 6:07 pm | at #5 North Dakota | #4 | Ralph Engelstad Arena • Grand Forks, North Dakota (Rivalry) | CBSSN | Davis | L 2–5 | 11,610 | 17–6–2 (8–4–1) |
| January 27 | 5:07 pm | at #5 North Dakota | #4 | Ralph Engelstad Arena • Grand Forks, North Dakota (Rivalry) | Midco | Davis | L 2–4 | 11,702 | 17–7–2 (8–5–1) |
| February 2 | 7:00 pm | #15 Western Michigan | #5 | Magness Arena • Denver, Colorado | | Davis | W 3–2 | 6,467 | 18–7–2 (9–5–1) |
| February 3 | 7:00 pm | #15 Western Michigan | #5 | Magness Arena • Denver, Colorado | | Davis | L 2–7 | 6,202 | 18–8–2 (9–6–1) |
| February 16 | 6:07 pm | at Minnesota Duluth | #5 | AMSOIL Arena • Duluth, Minnesota | CBSSN | Davis | W 5–4 ^{OT} | 5,598 | 19–8–2 (10–6–1) |
| February 17 | 6:07 pm | at Minnesota Duluth | #5 | AMSOIL Arena • Duluth, Minnesota | | Davis | W 5–2 | 6,131 | 20–8–2 (11–6–1) |
| February 23 | 7:00 pm | Miami | #3 | Magness Arena • Denver, Colorado | | Davis | T 3–3 ^{SOW} | 6,341 | 20–8–3 (11–6–2) |
| February 24 | 6:00 pm | Miami | #3 | Magness Arena • Denver, Colorado | | Davis | W 8–1 | 6,274 | 21–8–3 (12–6–2) |
| March 1 | 6:30 pm | at #15 St. Cloud State | #5 | Herb Brooks National Hockey Center • St. Cloud, Minnesota | Fox 9+ | Davis | W 6–2 | 3,688 | 22–8–3 (13–6–2) |
| March 2 | 5:00 pm | at #15 St. Cloud State | #5 | Herb Brooks National Hockey Center • St. Cloud, Minnesota | Fox 9+ | Davis | W 7–2 | 4,270 | 23–8–3 (14–6–2) |
| March 8 | 7:00 pm | at #10 Colorado College | #4 | Ed Robson Arena • Colorado Springs, Colorado (Rivalry) | SOCO CW, CBSSN | Davis | L 3–4 | 3,912 | 23–9–3 (14–7–2) |
| March 9 | 6:00 pm | #10 Colorado College | #4 | Magness Arena • Denver, Colorado (Rivalry) | | Davis | W 4–3 | 7,033 | 24–9–3 (15–7–2) |
NCHC Tournament
| March 15 | 7:07 pm | Minnesota Duluth* | #3 | Magness Arena • Denver, Colorado (Quarterfinal Game 1) | | Davis | W 4–0 | 5,461 | 25–9–3 |
| March 16 | 6:07 pm | Minnesota Duluth* | #3 | Magness Arena • Denver, Colorado (Quarterfinal Game 2) | | Davis | W 5–2 | 6,005 | 26–9–3 |
| March 22 | 6:37 pm | vs. #17 St. Cloud State* | #3 | Xcel Energy Center • Saint Paul, Minnesota (Semifinal) | CBSSN | Davis | W 5–4 ^{OT} | 8,977 | 27–9–3 |
| March 23 | 6:30 pm | vs. #11 Omaha* | #3 | Xcel Energy Center • Saint Paul, Minnesota (Championship) | CBSSN | Davis | W 4–1 | 6,929 | 28–9–3 |
NCAA Tournament
| March 28 | 12:00 pm | vs. #13 Massachusetts* | #3 | MassMutual Center • Springfield, Massachusetts (Northeast Regional Semifinal) | ESPN2 | Davis | W 2–1 ^{2OT} | 3,894 | 29–9–3 |
| March 30 | 2:00 pm | vs. #12 Cornell* | #3 | MassMutual Center • Springfield, Massachusetts (Northeast Regional Final) | ESPN2 | Davis | W 2–1 | 4,407 | 30–9–3 |
| April 11 | 3:00 pm | vs. #2 Boston University* | #3 | Xcel Energy Center • Saint Paul, Minnesota (National Semifinal) | ESPN2 | Davis | W 2–1 ^{OT} | | 31–9–3 |
| April 13 | 4:00 pm | vs. #1 Boston College* | #3 | Xcel Energy Center • Saint Paul, Minnesota (National Championship) | ESPN2 | Davis | W 2–0 | | 32–9–3 |
*Non-conference game. ^{#}Rankings from USCHO.com Poll. All times are in Mountain Time. Source:

== NCAA tournament ==
=== Regional semifinal ===
| March 28, 2024; 2:00 pm | (1) Denver | 2–1 (2OT) (0–0, 1–1, 0–0, 0–0, 1–0) | (4) Massachusetts | MassMutual Center; Attendance: 3,894 |

Game reference

Matt Davis
Goalies
Michael Hrabal
Referees:
Tony Czech
Jonathon Sitarski
Linesmen:
Justin Cornell
Pat Richardson

| (Lemyre, Caponi) Boston Buckberger (9) – 25:12 | 1–0 |
| | 1–1 | 32:52 – Liam Gorman (1) (Murray, Vanroboys) |
| (Buckberger, Devine) Tristan Broz (15) – GW – 92:28 | 2–1 |

4 min
Penalties
4 min
43
Shots
47

Game summary
Both teams looked ready to play at the start. Denver was skating fast while Massachusetts played a more physical game, though the Pioneers didn't back down. Near the middle of the period, an odd bounce off of the end boards popped right out in front of the Denver cage to a streaking Michael Cameron. The Minuteman was unable to settle the bouncing puck and was forced to rush a close shot on Matt Davis. While the goalie stopped the relatively easy shot, the player lost his edge and slid into the netminder but the puck stayed out. Afterwards, the play began tilting in favor of Massachusetts thank to their forechecking and solid defensive play. Denver avoided another disaster when McKade Webster hit Zeev Buium with a clearing attempt. The puck rebounded towards the Denver cage but Davis was aware enough to stop the puck as it was rolling towards his feet. Denver was able to refocus after a TV timeout and play evened out for the final third of the period. Both teams got scoring chances in the final five minutes but the puck refused to cooperate and the game remained scoreless. With about two minutes left, Taylor Makar and Sean Behrens got into a battle behind the goal. Makar grabbed the Pioneer player as both fell down but the referees made no call. On the ensuing faceoff, Liam Gorman was called for a boarding minor and gave the nation's #16 power play a chance to score. UMass managed to kill off the rest of the period with a man down. Just before the final buzzer, the clock was stopped erroneously when the Minutemen cleared the puck into Denver's end of the ice. Rather than try to determine of there was any time remaining on the clock, the officials announced that the period was over. Because the faceoff would have been held at center ice with less than three seconds, neither team had any issue with the decision.

Denver continued to increase its offensive pressure in the second period and starting taking control of the game. Just past the 5-minute mark, a high cycle play ended up causing Michael Hrabal to get screened by both teams. With the goalie unable to see the puck, Boston Buckberger fired the puck from the top of the circle into the far corner for the first goal of the game. UMass resumed its physical play in the wake of the opening goal and tried to establish some zone time. While the Minutemen did get some scoring chances, Denver counterpunched and got several more chances of their own. The Minutemen continued to lay the body and eventually forced Denver into a turnover behind their own net with about seven minutes left in the period. The 4th-line for UMass threw the puck in front of the net for an attempt from Lucas Vanroboys but his shot was stopped by Davis. Davis also stopped the next shot off of the rebound but the puck then bounced to Liam Gormam. By then, Davis was sprawled out on his back and unable to stop the backhand, allowing Gorman to tie the game with his first of the season. Massachusetts seemed inspired by the goal and redoubled their efforts over the next several minutes. Davis came under siege by the UMass offense but he was able to weather the storm and keep the match tied. Vanroboys got a further chance with about 2 minutes to play but he was taken down on his way to the cage. Once more, the referees decided against calling a penalty, however, as Vanroboys' stick hit a Denver player in the head both could have ended up receiving minor penalties.

When play resumed in the third period, the style remained the same. UMass continued to attack Denver whenever the Pioneers got the puck and gave the favorites no room to maneuver. When Denver did get a scoring chance, their shots either went wide or were blocked before getting to the UMass net. Despite their failures to score, the pressure did eventually cause the Minutemen to make a mistake. Near the middle of the period, Behrens managed to get behind the Massachusetts defense and forced Linden Alger to take a hooking penalty. Denver wasn't able to get set up in the offensive zone but still had a few good looks at the net. With about 7 minutes to play, a mistake inside the UMass blue line by Aidan Thompson caused him to lose control of the puck. He then grabbed the Minuteman to prevent an odd-man rush and was called for interference. Near the end of the man-advantage, Cole O'Hara had a glorious opportunity for a one-timer but he wasn't able to get good wood on the puck and Davis made a relatively easy save. After the penalty expired, Massachusetts continued to carry the play and has several more scoring chances, but Davis stood his ground. In the final few minutes, Denver began to ratchet up their offense once more but the UMass defense was equal to the task.

Both teams began overtime by trying to score quick. End-to-end rushes by both sides were unable to break the tie. After a pair of near-misses by Denver, one from the doorstep by Jack Devine, UMass began generating some zone time of their own and the game continued to see-saw back and forth in the first 5 minutes. The mostly even battle persisted but Devine ended up getting a second chance to end the game when he wrapped the puck around the cage at the 8-minute mark. Unfortunately for Denver, his shot hit the side of the cage and stayed out. About a minute later, Scott Morrow nearly ended the game when Davis wasn't able to pick up his shot but the puck hit Davis in the shoulder and bounced wide. The play started to slow down in the middle part of the period as both teams were becoming tired. Ryan Lautenbach nearly got a chance to end the game with less than 7 minutes to play but the puck was deflected away at the last moment by Tristan Lemyre. Shortly thereafter, Devine got a third scoring chance in overtime after a missed clearing attempt but his shot was stopped by Hrabal's pad. A few minutes later it was Cam O'Neill's turn to get a scoring opportunity from the high slot but Davis was equally unbeatable. With less than 90 seconds to play, Davis missed the puck as it rolled behind the net. UMass knocked it out in front of the net for an open Lucas Mercuri but the puck jumped over his stick and the Minutemen missed an open cage.

The second overtime period began in a similar fashion, with scoring chances being generated by both teams, however, Denver's structure of was beginning to break down. UMass took advantage and got a few good looks at the cage in the third minute but Davis remained stout. Off of a faceoff in the UMass end, Sam Harris took a tripping call and gave UMass a second power play. Massachusetts won the ensuing faceoff and quickly got the puck on goal. While Davis made the save, he was felled by an apparent groin injury (though it turned out to just be cramps). After a medical stoppage, Davis remained in goal and tried to play through the pain. UMass got a few more changes on goal but Denver kept the Minutemen at bay. Right at the end of the penalty, Lautenbach got on a short-handed break but missed the net with his shot. After the penalty expired play evened out and both teams found enough energy to get several scoring chances. Hrabal's right pad continued to be save the game for UMass and allow his team to try and pull off the upset. Massachusetts held the balance of play in the middle of the period but Denver was able to set up in the offensive zone with less than eight minutes left. The puck was wrapped around behind the goal and came out to Tristan Broz in the high slot. He fired a shot into the top corner of the net for the apparent winning goal but the play was reviewed for goaltender interference. Sam Harris had made contact with Hrabal but the referees rules that he had been pushed into the crease by Aaron Bohlinger so the goal stood and Denver advanced.

=== Regional final ===
| March 30, 2024; 4:00 pm | (1) Denver | 2–1 (1–1, 1–0, 0–0) | (3) Cornell | MassMutual Center; Attendance: 4,407 |

Game reference

Matt Davis
Goalies
Ian Shane
Referees:
Colin Kronforst
Andrew Bruggeman
Linesmen:
Sam Shikowsky
Tommy George

| | 0–1 | 06:44 – Nick Desantis (8) (Seger, Penney) |
| (Webster, Buckberger) Miko Matikka (20) – 18:31 | 1–1 |
| (S. Buium, Z. Buium) Sam Harris (14) – GW PP – 39:56 | 2–1 |

2 min
Penalties
4 min
18
Shots
25

Game summary
The game began with Denver testing Cornell's defense. The Pioneers managed to cause a turnover that led to a scoring chance in the slot but Ian Shane made the stop. Cornell fought through the early difficulty and then slowly got up to speed. After establishing themselves in the offensive zone, the Big Red fired a barrage on the Denver cage. Matt Davis made several stops but was unable to freeze the puck in a scramble. When Davis tried to regain his footing, Nick DeSantis found the puck and shot it between the goaltender's legs for the first goal of the game. Cornell kept with their defensive game afterwards and prevented Denver from setting up their offense. The Pioneers were able to get several rushes up the ice and get shots on goal but they were not able to sustain any presence in Cornell's end. On one of Cornell's counter rushes up the ice, DeSantis tried to make a move around Kieran Cebrian but the Denver defenseman ended up committing an interference penalty. Half-way through the man-advantage, a Cornell defender fell down inside the offensive blueline and allowed Denver to get on a 2-on-0 break. With Cornell backchecking hard, the Jared Wright made a rushed shot in close that Shane was able to stop. Cornell's offense continued to earn chances following defensive plays and Jonathan Castagna broke in on the Denver cage. Davis made the save but, again, could not freeze the puck. A follow-up chance from a sharp angle missed a partially open cage and sailed high. With about 90 seconds to play, a turnover just inside the Cornell blueline by McKade Webster got the puck to Miko Matikka and he rifled a shot into the top corner from the top of the circle.

The second began with DeSantis getting a partial break on the Denver net but Davis was able to make the save. Denver tried to get their high-powered offense going afterwards but the Cornell defense continued their oppressive style and limit the Pioneers. The Big Red were able to use a sizable advantage in the faceoff circle to ice the puck and get out of trouble without giving Denver a subsequent scoring chance. Even when Denver was able to get a shot on goal, they were quite often one-and-done with Cornell either able to clear the puck or Shane freezing it for a faceoff. In the middle of the period, there were several circumstances where penalties could have been called on either team but the officials appeared comfortable in letting the physical play occur. It wasn't until well past the midway point of the period that either team was able to get some extended zone time and Cornell was able to cycle the puck in the Denver end. The Big Red threw the puck across the frost of the cage several times but they weren't able to get a grade-A chance on goal. Cornell continued to press in the offensive zone and was nearly able to take the lead when a shot from the point by Ben Robertson trickled past Davis and slid just past the outside of the right post. In the final few minutes of the period, Denver was finally able to get set up in the offensive zone but the Cornell defense still would not give the Pioneers a clean shot at the net. Jacob Kraft made several blocks to keep the puck away from Shane and eventually cleared the zone. With under a minute to play, Castagna hit Jack Devine late and was whistled for a minor penalty. With just seconds left in the period, Sam Harris was able to tip a Shai Buium shot between Shane's legs. The puck squeaked through the goaltender's pads and had just enough momentum to slide into the net.

With the lead for the first time, Denver looked far more relaxed at the start of the third. Cornell, however, was undeterred and kept playing their game. Denver managed to get the forecheck working and forced the Big Red into coughing up the puck multiple times. While the Pioneers got scoring chances from the mistakes, Cornell's defense was able to recover in time to stop any further scoring. At about the 12-minute mark, Cornell was able to convert a turnover into a tremendous scoring chance but Davis kept shots from both Kyle Penney and DeSantis out of the goal. As the Big Red began to switch to a more offensive style, Denver was able to get better looks on Shane. With about six minutes to play, a scrum next to the Pioneers resulted in the puck getting to an open Cornell player in the high slot. Just before he was about to shoot, the referees whistled the play dead for a hand-pass. Cornell pressed harder, looking for the tying goal and got several good looks on goal. With about three minutes to play, Castagna nearly made up for his penalty when he slapped a one-timer at an open goal but the puck just fluttered wide. Thirty seconds later, Shane was pulled for an extra attacker and David Carle called a timeout to give the Pioneers a breather. Gabriel Seger won the ensuing draw but Ryan Walsh was immediately called for a slashing minor. Cornell quickly got the puck up the ice but with Shane remaining in goal the Big Red had little chance to score on the penalty kill. at the 90-second mark, Ian Shane fumbled a clearing attempt and the puck came to Devine right in front of the net. When he went to shoot the puck it hopped and was sent wide. Cornell managed to kill of the disadvantage and tried to set up a tying goal. Seger found Walsh off to the side of the cage but his one-timer was stopped by Davis and Denver advanced to the Frozen Four.

=== National semifinal ===
| April 11, 2024; 4:00 pm | (W1) Boston University | 1–2 (OT) (1–0, 0–1, 0–0, 0–1) | (NE1) Denver | Xcel Energy Center; Attendance: 18,598 |

Game reference

Mathieu Caron
Goalies
Matt Davis
Referees:
Colin Kronforst
Andrew Bruggeman
Linesmen:
Samuel Shikowsky
Tommy George

| (G. McCarthy) Luke Tuch (10) – SH – 7:45 | 1–0 |
| | 1–1 | 35:21 – Tristan Lemyre (2) (Matikka) |
| | 1–2 | 71:09 – GW – Tristan Broz (16) (Behrens) |

10 min
Penalties
2 min
34
Shots
29

Game summary
In the first minute of play, Macklin Celebrini found himself alone in front of the net but Matt Davis managed to make the save. BU continued to apply pressure and threaten the Denver cage in the early minutes but the Denver defense held them off. The Pioneers attempted to counterattack but the Terriers used their live legs to backcheck effectively. Denver didn't get a shot on goal until after the 5-minute mark but when the did they got a great chance off of the rebound. Fortunately for BU, Mathieu Caron was able match his counterpart and stop the puck. After the ensuing faceoff, Nick Zabaneh was called for high-sticking and gave Denver the game's first power play. The Pioneers generated several chances but, as the penalty was winding down, Luke Tuch took advantage of a the puck bouncing off of Jack Devine's skate and got a breakaway from center ice. He fired a shot into the top corner from the left circle for the game's opening goal. The pace of the game remained fast and, despite the puck spending much of its time in the Denver end, shots on goal were at a premium. In the latter half of the first, the two teams spent much of their time counterpunching. The Denver defense continued to stand strong and a hit by Sean Behrens on Celebrini with about 5-minutes to play looked to possibly be a hit to the head, however, during the next stoppage, Jay Pandolfo did not ask for a challenge before the faceoff. Boston University remained in control for much of the final few minutes. With under two to play, Sam Stevens deflected a shot on goal that nearly scored but the puck dribbled wide.

Denver started the second with a greater emphasis on their forecheck but the Terriers still remained on the attack. Celebrini got another great scoring chance about 2 minutes into the second and he tried to bunt a fluttering puck into a half open cage but it hopped wide. The Pioneers continued to struggle against the omnipresent attack from BU and were restricted to getting what little offense they could from the outside. The only thing keeping Denver in the game in the first 30 minutes of the match was their stalwart defense BU's offense kept firing shots on Davis whether it be open looks, bombs from the point, or passes across the front of the net but Davis was in place to keep his team in the game. In the back half of the second Denver was finally able to establish some zone time and after turning over the puck behind the BU cage, Miko Matikka found Tristan Lemyre for a shot that leaked through Caron to tie the score. Jared Wright nearly gave Denver the lead just seconds later when the puck bounced to him in front of the cage but Caron managed to close his five-hole in time. A minute later, Tuch pasted Devine into the board with a hard check. Shortly thereafter, Tom Willander was apparently tripped but no call was made and it was apparent that the referees had swallowed their whistles. With under 30 seconds to play, Denver got a surprise rush up the ice and Aidan Thompson got a glorious scoring chance when he beat Caron with a deke but the BU goaltender made a desperate save with his glove right in front of the goal line.

Both teams got their chances at the start of the third but neither could get the puck to cooperate. At about the 3-minute mark, Willander was given a tripping minor to give Denver its second per play chance. The Pioneers got several chances and were nearly able to score near the end from a scramble in front of the net but the Terriers defenders just managed to keep the puck out of the net. BU started to take over near the middle of the period but their momentum was arrested when Jack Harvey was whistled for a trip. The penalty was bad enough but made all the worse because just seconds before a potential boarding penalty on Denver went uncalled. The third chance for Denver was a bit more deliberate and the Pioneers didn't seem as focused as they had been on the previous two. Just as the penalty expired, Jack Devine found a loose puck and had a yawning cage as Caron had slid out of position but, for the second time in the game, the glove hand reached back and snatched the puck as it was sliding towards a sure goal. Afterwards both offenses struggled to find any kind of consistency and neither team seemed able to hold onto the puck. With under 4 minutes to play, Celebrini found Harvey alone in front of the net for a one-timer but the puck hit the post as stayed out. About 30 seconds later, Lane Hutson was tripped by a Denver play but, yet again, the referees refused to call a penalty on Denver. Chances continued to come fast and Denver had a chance off of a rush with 2 minutes to play but Caron made the save. With under 90 seconds to play, Dylan Peterson layed a hard check on Behrens on the forecheck and the defender was buried into the boards. Peterson got 2 minutes for boarding to give Denver its fourth power play of the game. Boston University pulled in tight and held the fort to keep the Pioneers mostly to the outside and they were able to bleed the clock down and force overtime.

The Terriers opened overtime by killing off the remainder of the penalty and then immediately getting back on offense. Denver counterattacked and nearly found the net from a Thompson backhander but he didn't quite have the angle. After 3 minutes, a scrum in front of the BU cage resulted in penalties on both teams and created a 4-on-4. With open ice, the Terriers carried the balance of play and Hutson made a brilliant play at the blueline to get in close but couldn't get the puck past Davis. Caron was forced to make a pair of saves afterwards to save his squad and play returned to normal. Afterwards, Sam Stevens injured his knee on what was likely a tripping penalty and, despite the puck not being in the offensive zone, the officials did not blow the play dead to provide assistance to the downed player. Even though they could not buy a call, the Terriers continued to press and a hard one-timer from Celebrini just barely missed the net. Just before the midway point of the period. A slash by Denver was again not called by the officials, leaving coach Pandolfo nearly apoplectic on the bench. About a minute later, Tristan Broz skated into the BU end and fired a shot from the right circle, it went right between Caron's legs for the winning goal.

=== National Championship ===
| April 13, 2024; 5:00 pm | (E1) Boston College | 0–2 (0–0, 0–2, 0–0) | (NE1) Denver | Xcel Energy Center; Attendance: 18,694 |

| Referees: Joe Carusone; C. J. Hanafin; Linesmen: Ryan Knapp; Patrick Dapuzzo |

Scoring summary
| Period | Team | Goal | Assist(s) | Time | Score |
|---|---|---|---|---|---|
| 1st | no scoring | | | | |
| 2nd | DU | Jared Wright (15) – GW | Lorenz, S. Buium | 29:42 | 1–0 DU |
| 2nd | DU | Rieger Lorenz (16) | Z. Buium, Behrens | 35:16 | 2–0 DU |
| 3rd | no scoring | | | | |
Penalty summary
| Period | Team | Player | Penalty | Time | PIM |
| 1st | no penalties | | | | |
| 2nd | BC | Mike Posma | Boarding | 24:31 | 2:00 |
| 3rd | DU | McKade Webster | Holding | 41:29 | 2:00 |
| 3rd | DU | Jack Devine | Tripping | 52:06 | 2:00 |

Shots by period
| Team | 1 | 2 | 3 | T |
|---|---|---|---|---|
| Denver | 8 | 13 | 5 | 26 |
| Boston College | 5 | 7 | 23 | 35 |

Goaltenders
| Team | Name | Saves | Goals against | Time on ice |
|---|---|---|---|---|
| DU | Matt Davis | 35 | 0 | 60:00 |
| BC | Jacob Fowler | 24 | 2 | 57:23 |

Game summary
The game began at a modest pace with both teams probing for a weakness. Denver got the first chance when a turnover at center ice led to a 3-on-1 break but Jacob Fowler was in position to make the save. A few minutes later, BC moved the puck into the Denver zone and Cutter Gauthier shot the puck wide. The rubber rebounded behind the net and came out to Andre Gasseau. The Eagle forward had a wide-open net to shoot at but didn't quite have the right angle and his shot hit the post dead-center and stayed out. Denver controlled the puck for much of the early part of the game but BC's defense kept the Pioneers to the outside. The best chance for DU came when a missed pass by Boston College came right to Lucas Ölvestad in front of the net. Fowler slid to the top of the crease and kicked away the backhand attempt. The Eagles then counterattacked and got an odd-man rush into Denver's end and though they weren't able to score they finally got their first shot on goal. The second shot from BC came when Will Smith got a breakaway but Matt Davis was able to close his five hole in time. Denver then replied with a couple of good looks on goal but Folwer and the Boston College defense kept the game scoreless. The two teams continued to test one another and, while several chances were generated, most would not end up with a shot on goal. BC tilted the ice in its favor in the second half and began to apply pressure on the Denver defense. The Pioneers were equal to the test and held off the highly-talented Eagles. Denver ended the period by getting its first shot in over 8 minutes of playing time but the period belonged to the defensive corps.

The second began with Denver on the attack but Fowler remained stout in goal. BC was quick to respond and get chances of their own and Davis had his chance to make a few saves. Nerves appeared to get the better of both teams when a series of made to end multiple attempted rushes. Just before the 5-minute mark, Mike Posma pushed McKade Webster into the end boards from behind and was given a minor for boarding. The injured Webster was taken to the locker room while his teammates tried to solve the best penalty kill in the nation. Denver was able to set up in the BC zone but several stick checks and blocked shots prevented the Pioneers from getting a shot on goal. Just before the mid-way point of the game, Oskar Jellvik found Gasseau wide open in the high slot but could not solve Davis. Gauthier had a chance off the rebound but his shot went wide. Less then a minute later, Jared Wright fired a shot from the left circle that beat Fowler but not the post. The puck rebounded and hit Fowler in the back then fluttered in the air towards the goal. The BC netminder waved blindly at the puck while two of his teammates tired desperately to knock the biscuit away from the goal but they were just not quick enough and the rubber hopped into the goal. Denver went on the attack afterwards and didn't give the Eagles any chance to even the score. Around the 7-minute mark, a flubbed pass at the Pioneer blueline gave Jared Wright a breakaway but Fowler was able to make the save from in tight. A few minutes later, Zeev Buium made a tremendous pass to Rieger Lorenz in the left circle and the Denver forward fired the puck into the near corner. Now down by a pair, the Eagles went on the attack but Denver's defense stood firm and prevented a high-quality scoring chance. The Pioneers' suffocating defense was on full display in the final minutes of the period and frustrated BC time and again.

Greg Brown changed up the lines for the third period, trying to get some spark of life for the BC offense. The Eagles got a scoring chance early and within 90 seconds, Jacob Bengtsson forced Webster into taking a minor penalty. The #2 power play took on a rather poor PK and the Eagles were able to get a tremendous chance when Gabe Perreault found Ryan Leonard wide open in the low slot. Davis jumped back across the net and somehow managed to get his glove on the shot. BC continued to press after the penalty ended but Denver had pulled back into a defensive shell and did their best to melt down the Eagle rushes. At the 8-minute mark, Smith got open in the high slot and beat Davis with a hard shot, however, the puck clanked off of the right post and bounced away from the goal. With just less than 8 minutes to play, Jack Devine made a mistake on the forecheck and took a tripping penalty. The Eagles turned the man-advantage into a shooting gallery but could not get the puck past Davis. Even though the defense blocked several shots, four grade-A chances made in on goal but BC continued to be frustrated by the junior netminder. As time wound down, Fowler remained in the net despite Boston College having possession in the Denver end. The Eagles didn't pull their goaltender until less there was less than 3 minutes to play and put the Denver goal under constant pressure in the final moments of the match. Denver's defense held and turned aside all attempts to win the 10th National Championship in program history.

== Scoring statistics ==
| Name | Position | Games | Goals | Assists | Points | PIM |
|---|---|---|---|---|---|---|
| Jack Devine | RW | 44 | 27 | 29 | 56 | 20 |
| Zeev Buium | D | 42 | 11 | 39 | 50 | 20 |
| Massimo Rizzo | C | 30 | 10 | 34 | 44 | 10 |
| Tristan Broz | C | 43 | 16 | 24 | 40 | 13 |
| Shai Buium | D | 43 | 7 | 29 | 36 | 14 |
| Carter King | F | 37 | 15 | 19 | 34 | 2 |
| Miko Matikka | RW | 43 | 20 | 13 | 33 | 41 |
| McKade Webster | LW | 43 | 14 | 18 | 32 | 54 |
| Sean Behrens | D | 44 | 4 | 27 | 31 | 53 |
| Rieger Lorenz | C/LW | 44 | 16 | 14 | 30 | 10 |
| Aidan Thompson | C | 44 | 11 | 19 | 30 | 35 |
| Boston Buckberger | D | 44 | 5 | 22 | 27 | 27 |
| Jared Wright | RW | 44 | 15 | 10 | 25 | 8 |
| Sam Harris | LW | 42 | 14 | 7 | 21 | 27 |
| Connor Caponi | F | 44 | 5 | 9 | 14 | 26 |
| Kieran Cebrian | F | 36 | 3 | 10 | 13 | 14 |
| Kent Anderson | D | 41 | 3 | 4 | 7 | 12 |
| Cale Ashcroft | D | 37 | 1 | 6 | 7 | 4 |
| Lucas Ölvestad | D | 32 | 0 | 6 | 6 | 14 |
| Alex Weiermair | C | 24 | 3 | 3 | 6 | 2 |
| Tristan Lemyre | C | 24 | 2 | 4 | 6 | 0 |
| Garrett Brown | D | 8 | 0 | 4 | 4 | 14 |
| Matt Davis | G | 31 | 0 | 3 | 3 | 0 |
| Freddie Halyk | G | 13 | 0 | 1 | 1 | 0 |
| Paxton Geisel | G | 2 | 0 | 0 | 0 | 0 |
| Total | | | 202 | 354 | 556 | 424 |

== Goaltending statistics ==
| Name | Games | Minutes | Wins | Losses | Ties | Goals against | Saves | Shut outs | SV % | GAA |
|---|---|---|---|---|---|---|---|---|---|---|
| Matt Davis | 31 | 1871:55 | 23 | 5 | 3 | 73 | 807 | 2 | .917 | 2.34 |
| Freddie Halyk | 13 | 720:28 | 8 | 4 | 0 | 10 | 265 | 3 | .883 | 2.91 |
| Paxton Geisel | 2 | 95:14 | 1 | 0 | 0 | 7 | 42 | 0 | .857 | 4.41 |
| Empty Net | - | 25:10 | - | - | - | 5 | - | - | - | - |
| Total | 44 | 2712:47 | 32 | 9 | 3 | 120 | 1114 | 5 | .903 | 2.65 |

== Rankings ==
| Poll | Week | | | | | | | | | | | | | | | | | | | | | | | | | | |
| Poll | Pre | 1 | 2 | 3 | 4 | 5 | 6 | 7 | 8 | 9 | 10 | 11 | 12 | 13 | 14 | 15 | 16 | 17 | 18 | 19 | 20 | 21 | 22 | 23 | 24 | 25 | 26 (Final) |
|---|---|---|---|---|---|---|---|---|---|---|---|---|---|---|---|---|---|---|---|---|---|---|---|---|---|---|---|
| USCHO.com | 4 | 3 (4) | 2 (10) | 2 (6) | 2 (5) | 2 (5) | 3 (3) | 4 (2) | 3 (1) | 4 (2) | 5 | – | 6 | 6 | 5 (1) | 4 (1) | 5 | 6 | 5 | 3 | 5 | 4 | 3 | 3 | 3 | – | 1 (50) |
| USA Hockey | 5 | 3 (1) | 2 (9) | 2 (1) | 2 (5) | 2 (3) | 2 (3) | 4 | 3 | 5 (1) | 5 | 5 | – | 6 | 6 | 4 | 6 | 6 | 5т | 3 | 4 | 4 | 3 | 3 | 3 | 3 | 1 (34) |

Note: USCHO did not release a poll in weeks 11 or 25.
Note: USA Hockey did not release a poll in week 12.

== Awards and honors ==
| Player | Award | Ref |
|---|---|---|
| Matt Davis | NCAA Tournament Most Outstanding Player | |
| Zeev Buium | AHCA West First Team All-American | |
| Jack Devine | AHCA West First Team All-American | |
| Massimo Rizzo | AHCA West Second Team All-American | |
| Matt Davis | NCAA All-Tournament team | |
| Sean Behrens | NCAA All-Tournament team | |
| Zeev Buium | NCAA All-Tournament team | |
| Tristan Broz | NCAA All-Tournament team | |
| Rieger Lorenz | NCAA All-Tournament team | |
| Zeev Buium | NCHC Rookie of the Year | |
| Sean Behrens | NCHC Defensive Defenseman of the Year | |
| Zeev Buium | NCHC Offensive Defenseman of the Year | |
| McKade Webster | Frozen Faceoff MVP | |
| Zeev Buium | NCHC First Team | |
| Jack Devine | NCHC First Team | |
| Shai Buium | NCHC Second Team | |
| Massimo Rizzo | NCHC Second Team | |
| Zeev Buium | NCHC Rookie Team | |
| Miko Matikka | NCHC Rookie Team | |
| Zeev Buium | Frozen Faceoff All-Tournament Team | |
| McKade Webster | Frozen Faceoff All-Tournament Team | |
| Miko Matikka | Frozen Faceoff All-Tournament Team | |

== 2024 NHL entry draft ==
| Round | Pick | Player | NHL team |
|---|---|---|---|
| 1 | 12 | Zeev Buium | Minnesota Wild |
| 4 | 121 | Jake Fisher ^{†} | Colorado Avalanche |
| 4 | 128 | Hagen Burrows ^{†} | Tampa Bay Lightning |
| 6 | 185 | Tory Pitner ^{†} | Colorado Avalanche |
| 7 | 198 | James Reeder ^{†} | Los Angeles Kings |

† incoming freshman
