= 2023–24 NHL transactions =

The following is a list of all team-to-team transactions that have occurred in the National Hockey League for the 2023–24 NHL season. It lists which team each player has been traded to, signed by, or claimed by, and for which player(s) or draft pick(s), if applicable. Players who have retired or that have had their contracts terminated are also listed.

The 2023–24 NHL trade deadline was on March 8, 2024. Players traded or claimed off waivers after that date were not be eligible to play in the 2024 Stanley Cup playoffs.

== Retirement ==
Date	Player	Last Team	Ref
June 30, 2023	Markus Nutivaara	San Jose Sharks	
July 5, 2023	Darren Helm	Colorado Avalanche	
July 5, 2023	Michael Stone	Calgary Flames	
July 6, 2023	Patric Hornqvist	Florida Panthers	
July 12, 2023	Thomas Greiss	St. Louis Blues	
July 19, 2023	Nate Thompson	Philadelphia Flyers	
July 25, 2023	Patrice Bergeron	Boston Bruins	
August 14, 2023	David Krejci	Boston Bruins	
August 21, 2023	Jonathan Bernier	New Jersey Devils	
August 27, 2023	Joonas Donskoi	Seattle Kraken	
August 30, 2023	Carl Hagelin	Washington Capitals	
September 6, 2023	Michael Del Zotto	Anaheim Ducks	
September 10, 2023	Andrew Ladd	Arizona Coyotes	
September 12, 2023	Nick Holden	Ottawa Senators	
September 20, 2023	Paul Byron	Montreal Canadiens	
September 24, 2023	Cory Schneider	New York Islanders	
October 1, 2023	Brandon Sutter	Vancouver Canucks	
October 3, 2023	Derek Stepan	Carolina Hurricanes	
October 4, 2023	Anthony Bitetto	Florida Panthers	
October 26, 2023	Zack Kassian	Arizona Coyotes	
October 31, 2023	Paul Stastny	Carolina Hurricanes	
March 18, 2024	Wayne Simmonds	Toronto Maple Leafs	
April 17, 2024	Jeff Carter	Pittsburgh Penguins	
April 18, 2024	Jakob Silfverberg^{1}	Anaheim Ducks	
April 19, 2024	Pavel Francouz	Colorado Avalanche	
April 23, 2024	Jakub Voracek	Utah Hockey Club	
May 17, 2024	Zach Parise^{2}	Colorado Avalanche	
June 17, 2024	Brian Elliott	Tampa Bay Lightning	
June 21, 2024	Andrew Cogliano	Colorado Avalanche	
June 23, 2024	Derick Brassard	Ottawa Senators	

1. Silfverberg announced on April 11, 2024 that he would retire at the conclusion of the season; the Ducks played their final game of the year on April 18, 2024.
2. Parise announced on April 17, 2024 that he would retire at the conclusion of the season; the Avalanche were eliminated from the 2024 Stanley Cup playoffs on May 17, 2024.

== Contract terminations ==
A team and player may mutually agree to terminate a player's contract at any time. All players must clear waivers before having a contract terminated.

Buyouts can only occur at specific times of the year. For more details on contract terminations as buyouts:

Teams may buy out player contracts (after the conclusion of a season) for a portion of the remaining value of the contract, paid over a period of twice the remaining length of the contract. This reduced number and extended period is applied to the cap hit as well.

- If the player was under the age of 26 at the time of the buyout the player's pay and cap hit will reduced by a factor of 2/3 over the extended period.
- If the player was 26 or older at the time of the buyout the player's pay and cap hit will reduced by a factor of 1/3 over the extended period.
- If the player was 35 or older at the time of signing the contract the player's pay will be reduced by a factor of 1/3, but the cap hit will not be reduced over the extended period.

Injured players cannot be bought out.

Date	Player	Previous team	Notes	Ref
June 30, 2023	Josh Bailey	Chicago Blackhawks	Buyout	
July 1, 2023	Mike Reilly	Boston Bruins	Buyout	
July 1, 2023	Kailer Yamamoto	Detroit Red Wings	Buyout	
July 1, 2023	Matt Duchene	Nashville Predators	Buyout	
July 1, 2023	Blake Wheeler	Winnipeg Jets	Buyout	
July 7, 2023	Filip Zadina	Detroit Red Wings	Mutual termination	
July 7, 2023	Andy Andreoff	New York Islanders	Mutual termination	
July 14, 2023	Alex Galchenyuk	Arizona Coyotes	Termination	
July 15, 2023	Tony DeAngelo	Philadelphia Flyers	Buyout	
August 6, 2023	Jean-Sebastien Dea	Arizona Coyotes	Mutual termination	
August 14, 2023	Rodion Amirov	Toronto Maple Leafs	Termination^{1}	
September 7, 2023	Liam Kirk	Arizona Coyotes	Mutual termination	
September 10, 2023	Josh Archibald	Tampa Bay Lightning	Termination	
October 8, 2023	Jachym Kondelik	Nashville Predators	Mutual termination	
October 12, 2023	Andre Heim	St. Louis Blues	Mutual termination	
October 19, 2023	Karel Plasek	Pittsburgh Penguins	Termination	
November 9, 2023	Andreas Johnsson	Pittsburgh Penguins	Mutual termination	
November 29, 2023	Corey Perry	Chicago Blackhawks	Termination	
January 29, 2024	Nicolas Beaudin	Montreal Canadiens	Mutual termination	
February 7, 2024	Nick Bonino	New York Rangers	Mutual termination	
February 9, 2024	Leon Gawanke	San Jose Sharks	Mutual termination	
February 12, 2024	Nolan Stevens	Detroit Red Wings	Mutual termination	
February 16, 2024	Marcus Kallionkieli	Vegas Golden Knights	Termination	
February 24, 2024	Adam Ruzicka	Arizona Coyotes	Termination	
March 12, 2024	Topi Ronni^{2}	Calgary Flames	Termination	
May 4, 2024	Alexander Pashin	Carolina Hurricanes	Mutual termination	
May 15, 2024	Vladislav Firstov	Minnesota Wild	Mutual termination	
May 26, 2024	Ilya Usau	Tampa Bay Lightning	Mutual termination	
May 30, 2024	Kim Nousiainen	Los Angeles Kings	Mutual termination	
June 12, 2024	Nathan Todd	San Jose Sharks	Mutual termination	

1. Amirov's contract ended after his death on August 14, 2023. Amirov was diagnosed with a brain tumor in 2021.
2. Ronni was a draft-related restricted free agent for Calgary at the time of the termination, and was not under contract.

== Free agency ==
Note: This does not include players who have re-signed with their previous team as an unrestricted free agent or as a restricted free agent.

Date	Player	New team	Previous team	Ref
July 1, 2023	Emil Martinsen Lilleberg	Tampa Bay Lightning	Arizona Coyotes	
July 1, 2023	Ryan Reaves	Toronto Maple Leafs	Minnesota Wild	
July 1, 2023	Jonathan Quick	New York Rangers	Vegas Golden Knights	
July 1, 2023	Cam Talbot	Los Angeles Kings	Ottawa Senators	
July 1, 2023	Oliver Ekman-Larsson	Florida Panthers	Vancouver Canucks	
July 1, 2023	Matt Nieto	Pittsburgh Penguins	Colorado Avalanche	
July 1, 2023	Anthony Stolarz	Florida Panthers	Anaheim Ducks	
July 1, 2023	Luke Schenn	Nashville Predators	Toronto Maple Leafs	
July 1, 2023	Ryan O'Reilly	Nashville Predators	Toronto Maple Leafs	
July 1, 2023	Mikhail Maltsev	Los Angeles Kings	Colorado Avalanche	
July 1, 2023	Lane Pederson	Edmonton Oilers	Columbus Blue Jackets	
July 1, 2023	Kevin Stenlund	Florida Panthers	Winnipeg Jets	
July 1, 2023	James van Riemsdyk	Boston Bruins	Philadelphia Flyers	
July 1, 2023	Connor Brown	Edmonton Oilers	Washington Capitals	
July 1, 2023	Conor Sheary	Tampa Bay Lightning	Washington Capitals	
July 1, 2023	Blake Wheeler	New York Rangers	Winnipeg Jets	
July 1, 2023	Alex Belzile	New York Rangers	Montreal Canadiens	
July 1, 2023	Joonas Korpisalo	Ottawa Senators	Los Angeles Kings	
July 1, 2023	Tyler Pitlick	New York Rangers	St. Louis Blues	
July 1, 2023	Radko Gudas	Anaheim Ducks	Florida Panthers	
July 1, 2023	Kyle Burroughs	San Jose Sharks	Vancouver Canucks	
July 1, 2023	Erik Johnson	Buffalo Sabres	Colorado Avalanche	
July 1, 2023	James Reimer	Detroit Red Wings	San Jose Sharks	
July 1, 2023	Morgan Geekie	Boston Bruins	Seattle Kraken	
July 1, 2023	Connor Clifton	Buffalo Sabres	Boston Bruins	
July 1, 2023	Milan Lucic	Boston Bruins	Calgary Flames	
July 1, 2023	Alex Lyon	Detroit Red Wings	Florida Panthers	
July 1, 2023	Gustav Nyquist	Nashville Predators	Minnesota Wild	
July 1, 2023	Justin Holl	Detroit Red Wings	Toronto Maple Leafs	
July 1, 2023	Ian Cole	Vancouver Canucks	Tampa Bay Lightning	
July 1, 2023	Teddy Blueger	Vancouver Canucks	Vegas Golden Knights	
July 1, 2023	Dmitry Orlov	Carolina Hurricanes	Boston Bruins	
July 1, 2023	Mike Reilly	Florida Panthers	Boston Bruins	
July 1, 2023	Ryan Poehling	Philadelphia Flyers	Pittsburgh Penguins	
July 1, 2023	Bokondji Imama	Ottawa Senators	Arizona Coyotes	
July 1, 2023	Carson Soucy	Vancouver Canucks	Seattle Kraken	
July 1, 2023	Max Pacioretty	Washington Capitals	Carolina Hurricanes	
July 1, 2023	Craig Smith	Dallas Stars	Washington Capitals	
July 1, 2023	Brady Keeper	Montreal Canadiens	Vancouver Canucks	
July 1, 2023	Collin Delia	Winnipeg Jets	Vancouver Canucks	
July 1, 2023	Connor Mackey	New York Rangers	Arizona Coyotes	
July 1, 2023	Trevor Lewis	Los Angeles Kings	Calgary Flames	
July 1, 2023	Andreas Englund	Los Angeles Kings	Chicago Blackhawks	
July 1, 2023	Givani Smith	San Jose Sharks	Florida Panthers	
July 1, 2023	Dustin Tokarski	Buffalo Sabres	Pittsburgh Penguins	
July 1, 2023	Niko Mikkola	Florida Panthers	New York Rangers	
July 1, 2023	Kevin Shattenkirk	Boston Bruins	Anaheim Ducks	
July 1, 2023	Patrick Brown	Boston Bruins	Ottawa Senators	
July 1, 2023	Miles Wood	Colorado Avalanche	New Jersey Devils	
July 1, 2023	Daniel Sprong	Detroit Red Wings	Seattle Kraken	
July 1, 2023	Matt Duchene	Dallas Stars	Nashville Predators	
July 1, 2023	Matthew Highmore	Ottawa Senators	St. Louis Blues	
July 1, 2023	Garrett Pilon	Ottawa Senators	Washington Capitals	
July 1, 2023	Troy Stecher	Arizona Coyotes	Calgary Flames	
July 1, 2023	Sam Steel	Dallas Stars	Minnesota Wild	
July 1, 2023	Drake Caggiula	Edmonton Oilers	Pittsburgh Penguins	
July 1, 2023	Josh Archibald	Tampa Bay Lightning	Pittsburgh Penguins	
July 1, 2023	Jason Zucker	Arizona Coyotes	Pittsburgh Penguins	
July 1, 2023	Matt Irwin	Vancouver Canucks	Washington Capitals	
July 1, 2023	Devin Cooley	Buffalo Sabres	Nashville Predators	
July 1, 2023	Justin Richards	Buffalo Sabres	Columbus Blue Jackets	
July 1, 2023	Nick Bonino	New York Rangers	Pittsburgh Penguins	
July 1, 2023	Michael Bunting	Carolina Hurricanes	Toronto Maple Leafs	
July 1, 2023	Marian Studenic	Seattle Kraken	Dallas Stars	
July 1, 2023	Ryan Carpenter	San Jose Sharks	New York Rangers	
July 1, 2023	Luke Glendening	Tampa Bay Lightning	Dallas Stars	
July 1, 2023	Ryan Donato	Chicago Blackhawks	Seattle Kraken	
July 1, 2023	Josh Jacobs	St. Louis Blues	Colorado Avalanche	
July 1, 2023	Wyatt Kalynuk	St. Louis Blues	New York Rangers	
July 1, 2023	Mackenzie MacEachern	St. Louis Blues	Carolina Hurricanes	
July 1, 2023	Malcolm Subban	St. Louis Blues	Buffalo Sabres	
July 1, 2023	Laurent Brossoit	Winnipeg Jets	Vegas Golden Knights	
July 1, 2023	Zach Sawchenko	Vancouver Canucks	Carolina Hurricanes	
July 1, 2023	Anthony Richard	Boston Bruins	Montreal Canadiens	
July 1, 2023	Nick Bjugstad	Arizona Coyotes	Edmonton Oilers	
July 1, 2023	Noel Acciari	Pittsburgh Penguins	Toronto Maple Leafs	
July 1, 2023	Erik Kallgren	New Jersey Devils	Toronto Maple Leafs	
July 1, 2023	Alex Killorn	Anaheim Ducks	Tampa Bay Lightning	
July 1, 2023	Logan Brown	Tampa Bay Lightning	St. Louis Blues	
July 1, 2023	Ryan Graves	Pittsburgh Penguins	New Jersey Devils	
July 1, 2023	Alex Galchenyuk	Arizona Coyotes	Colorado Avalanche	
July 1, 2023	Dmitry Kulikov	Florida Panthers	Pittsburgh Penguins	
July 1, 2023	Jayson Megna	Boston Bruins	Anaheim Ducks	
July 1, 2023	Jonas Johansson	Tampa Bay Lightning	Colorado Avalanche	
July 1, 2023	Parker Wotherspoon	Boston Bruins	New York Islanders	
July 1, 2023	Jeffrey Viel	Winnipeg Jets	San Jose Sharks	
July 1, 2023	Kyle Criscuolo	New Jersey Devils	San Jose Sharks	
July 1, 2023	Justin Dowling	New Jersey Devils	Vancouver Canucks	
July 1, 2023	Vinni Lettieri	Minnesota Wild	Boston Bruins	
July 1, 2023	Jake Lucchini	Minnesota Wild	Ottawa Senators	
July 1, 2023	Brogan Rafferty	Detroit Red Wings	Seattle Kraken	
July 1, 2023	Lars Eller	Pittsburgh Penguins	Colorado Avalanche	
July 1, 2023	Rhett Gardner	Philadelphia Flyers	Dallas Stars	
July 1, 2023	Alex Nedeljkovic	Pittsburgh Penguins	Detroit Red Wings	
July 1, 2023	Troy Grosenick	Nashville Predators	Philadelphia Flyers	
July 1, 2023	Matt Villalta	Arizona Coyotes	Los Angeles Kings	
July 1, 2023	William Lagesson	Toronto Maple Leafs	Carolina Hurricanes	
July 1, 2023	Maxime Lajoie	Toronto Maple Leafs	Carolina Hurricanes	
July 1, 2023	Tim Gettinger	Detroit Red Wings	New York Rangers	
July 1, 2023	Jonathan Drouin	Colorado Avalanche	Montreal Canadiens	
July 1, 2023	Brian Dumoulin	Seattle Kraken	Pittsburgh Penguins	
July 1, 2023	Trevor Carrick	Anaheim Ducks	Tampa Bay Lightning	
July 1, 2023	J.T. Compher	Detroit Red Wings	Colorado Avalanche	
July 1, 2023	David Rittich	Los Angeles Kings	Winnipeg Jets	
July 1, 2023	Steven Santini	Los Angeles Kings	St. Louis Blues	
July 1, 2023	Erik Gustafsson	New York Rangers	Toronto Maple Leafs	
July 1, 2023	John Klingberg	Toronto Maple Leafs	Minnesota Wild	
July 1, 2023	Scott Sabourin	San Jose Sharks	Ottawa Senators	
July 1, 2023	Mitchell Chaffee	Tampa Bay Lightning	Minnesota Wild	
July 1, 2023	Alexander True	Florida Panthers	Seattle Kraken	
July 1, 2023	Alexander Kerfoot	Arizona Coyotes	Toronto Maple Leafs	
July 1, 2023	Jack Ahcan	Colorado Avalanche	Boston Bruins	
July 1, 2023	Arvid Holm	Colorado Avalanche	Winnipeg Jets	
July 1, 2023	Corey Schueneman	Colorado Avalanche	Montreal Canadiens	
July 1, 2023	Riley Tufte	Colorado Avalanche	Dallas Stars	
July 1, 2023	Chris Wagner	Colorado Avalanche	Boston Bruins	
July 1, 2023	Joona Koppanen	Pittsburgh Penguins	Boston Bruins	
July 1, 2023	Shayne Gostisbehere	Detroit Red Wings	Carolina Hurricanes	
July 1, 2023	Mason Geertsen	Vegas Golden Knights	New Jersey Devils	
July 1, 2023	Ryan Shea	Pittsburgh Penguins	Dallas Stars	
July 1, 2023	Garnet Hathaway	Philadelphia Flyers	Boston Bruins	
July 2, 2023	Christian Fischer	Detroit Red Wings	Arizona Coyotes	
July 2, 2023	Mac Hollowell	New York Rangers	Toronto Maple Leafs	
July 2, 2023	Magnus Hellberg	Pittsburgh Penguins	Detroit Red Wings	
July 2, 2023	Radim Zohorna	Pittsburgh Penguins	Toronto Maple Leafs	
July 2, 2023	Evan Rodrigues	Florida Panthers	Colorado Avalanche	
July 2, 2023	Will Lockwood	Florida Panthers	New York Rangers	
July 2, 2023	Joe Hicketts	Los Angeles Kings	Minnesota Wild	
July 2, 2023	Matthew Phillips	Washington Capitals	Calgary Flames	
July 2, 2023	Gavin Bayreuther	Dallas Stars	Columbus Blue Jackets	
July 2, 2023	Jordan Oesterle	Calgary Flames	Detroit Red Wings	
July 2, 2023	Lias Andersson	Montreal Canadiens	Los Angeles Kings	
July 2, 2023	Ben Gleason	Edmonton Oilers	Dallas Stars	
July 2, 2023	Kailer Yamamoto	Seattle Kraken	Detroit Red Wings	
July 2, 2023	Calvin de Haan	Tampa Bay Lightning	Carolina Hurricanes	
July 2, 2023	Tyler Bertuzzi	Toronto Maple Leafs	Boston Bruins	
July 2, 2023	Max Domi	Toronto Maple Leafs	Dallas Stars	
July 2, 2023	John Leonard	Arizona Coyotes	Nashville Predators	
July 3, 2023	Marc Staal	Philadelphia Flyers	Florida Panthers	
July 3, 2023	Dylan Gambrell	Toronto Maple Leafs	Ottawa Senators	
July 3, 2023	Alex Limoges	Washington Capitals	Winnipeg Jets	
July 3, 2023	Nathan Todd	San Jose Sharks	St. Louis Blues	
July 3, 2023	Brady Lyle	Calgary Flames	St. Louis Blues	
July 3, 2023	Connor Carrick	Seattle Kraken	Boston Bruins	
July 3, 2023	Will Butcher	Pittsburgh Penguins	Dallas Stars	
July 3, 2023	Jasper Weatherby	Nashville Predators	Detroit Red Wings	
July 4, 2023	Derrick Pouliot	Dallas Stars	San Jose Sharks	
July 4, 2023	Robert Hagg	Anaheim Ducks	Detroit Red Wings	
July 5, 2023	Victor Mete	Philadelphia Flyers	Toronto Maple Leafs	
July 5, 2023	Julien Gauthier	New York Islanders	Ottawa Senators	
July 5, 2023	Karson Kuhlman	New York Islanders	Winnipeg Jets	
July 5, 2023	Brian Pinho	New York Islanders	New Jersey Devils	
July 5, 2023	Rasmus Asplund	Florida Panthers	Nashville Predators	
July 5, 2023	Chase Priskie	Washington Capitals	Anaheim Ducks	
July 6, 2023	Zack MacEwen	Ottawa Senators	Los Angeles Kings	
July 7, 2023	Pierre-Edouard Bellemare	Seattle Kraken	Tampa Bay Lightning	
July 7, 2023	Vinnie Hinostroza	Pittsburgh Penguins	Buffalo Sabres	
July 7, 2023	Andreas Johnsson	Pittsburgh Penguins	San Jose Sharks	
July 10, 2023	Filip Zadina	San Jose Sharks	Detroit Red Wings	
July 11, 2023	Brendan Lemieux	Carolina Hurricanes	Philadelphia Flyers	
July 11, 2023	Denis Gurianov	Nashville Predators	Montreal Canadiens	
July 11, 2023	Travis Dermott	Arizona Coyotes	Vancouver Canucks	
July 12, 2023	Oskar Sundqvist	St. Louis Blues	Minnesota Wild	
July 12, 2023	Jesper Boqvist	Boston Bruins	New Jersey Devils	
July 14, 2023	Chris Tierney	New Jersey Devils	Montreal Canadiens	
July 14, 2023	Zach Sanford	Arizona Coyotes	Nashville Predators	
July 15, 2023	Justin Kirkland	Arizona Coyotes	Anaheim Ducks	
July 19, 2023	Tomas Nosek	New Jersey Devils	Boston Bruins	
July 24, 2023	Tony DeAngelo	Carolina Hurricanes	Philadelphia Flyers	
July 27, 2023	Vladimir Tarasenko	Ottawa Senators	New York Rangers	
August 7, 2023	Matt Dumba	Arizona Coyotes	Minnesota Wild	
August 7, 2023	Alex Stalock	Anaheim Ducks	Chicago Blackhawks	
August 9, 2023	Cal Foote	New Jersey Devils	Nashville Predators	
August 9, 2023	Martin Jones	Toronto Maple Leafs	Seattle Kraken	
August 10, 2023	Caleb Jones	Carolina Hurricanes	Chicago Blackhawks	
August 11, 2023	Pius Suter	Vancouver Canucks	Detroit Red Wings	
August 16, 2023	John Farinacci	Boston Bruins	Arizona Coyotes	
August 28, 2023	Simon Benoit	Toronto Maple Leafs	Anaheim Ducks	
August 31, 2023	Devin Shore	Seattle Kraken	Edmonton Oilers	
September 9, 2023	Tyler Motte	Tampa Bay Lightning	New York Rangers	
September 12, 2023	Tomas Tatar	Colorado Avalanche	New Jersey Devils	
September 17, 2023	Jujhar Khaira	Minnesota Wild	Chicago Blackhawks	
October 7, 2023	Max Willman	New Jersey Devils	Philadelphia Flyers	
October 7, 2023	Colin White	Pittsburgh Penguins	Florida Panthers	
October 8, 2023	Zach Aston-Reese	Detroit Red Wings	Toronto Maple Leafs	
October 9, 2023	Austin Watson	Tampa Bay Lightning	Ottawa Senators	
October 10, 2023	Noah Gregor	Toronto Maple Leafs	San Jose Sharks	
October 13, 2023	Adam Erne	Edmonton Oilers	Detroit Red Wings	
October 30, 2023	Danton Heinen	Boston Bruins	Pittsburgh Penguins	
November 28, 2023	Patrick Kane	Detroit Red Wings	New York Rangers	
December 2, 2023	Mark Pysyk	Calgary Flames	Detroit Red Wings	
December 28, 2023	Ethan Bear	Washington Capitals	Vancouver Canucks	
January 22, 2024	Corey Perry	Edmonton Oilers	Chicago Blackhawks	
January 26, 2024	Zach Parise	Colorado Avalanche	New York Islanders	
February 4, 2024	Jesse Puljujarvi	Pittsburgh Penguins	Carolina Hurricanes	
March 1, 2024	Max McCue	Columbus Blue Jackets	San Jose Sharks	
April 16, 2024	Marshall Warren	New York Islanders	Minnesota Wild	

=== Imports ===
This section is for players who were not previously on an NHL reserve-list in the past or current season, or players who had been signed to other professional leagues during that time. Listed is the last team and league they were under contract with.

Date	Player	New team	Previous team	League	Ref
July 1, 2023	Waltteri Merela	Tampa Bay Lightning	Tappara	Liiga	
July 1, 2023	Patrik Koch	Arizona Coyotes	HC Vitkovice Ridera	ELH	
July 1, 2023	Ludovic Waeber	Florida Panthers	ZSC Lions	NL	
July 1, 2023	Tristen Nielsen	Vancouver Canucks	Abbotsford Canucks	AHL	
July 1, 2023	Josh Currie	Ottawa Senators	Metallurg Magnitogorsk	KHL	
July 1, 2023	Nikolas Brouillard	New York Rangers	San Diego Gulls	AHL	
July 1, 2023	Philippe Maillet	Montreal Canadiens	Metallurg Magnitogorsk	KHL	
July 1, 2023	Jimmy Schuldt	Seattle Kraken	Coachella Valley Firebirds	AHL	
July 1, 2023	Luke Toporowski	Boston Bruins	Providence Bruins	AHL	
July 1, 2023	Marshall Rifai	Toronto Maple Leafs	Toronto Marlies	AHL	
July 1, 2023	Noel Hoefenmayer	Edmonton Oilers	Toronto Marlies	AHL	
July 1, 2023	Travis Barron	Arizona Coyotes	Tucson Roadrunners	AHL	
July 1, 2023	Gage Quinney	Vegas Golden Knights	Henderson Silver Knights	AHL	
July 1, 2023	Pierrick Dube	Washington Capitals	Laval Rocket	AHL	
July 1, 2023	Mason Morelli	Vegas Golden Knights	Hershey Bears	AHL	
July 2, 2023	Marc Johnstone	Pittsburgh Penguins	Toronto Marlies	AHL	
July 2, 2023	Montana Onyebuchi	Arizona Coyotes	San Jose Barracuda	AHL	
July 3, 2023	Nolan Stevens	Detroit Red Wings	Utica Comets	AHL	
July 3, 2023	Griffin Mendel	Carolina Hurricanes	Chicago Wolves	AHL	
July 19, 2023	Jeremie Biakabutuka	St. Louis Blues	Charlottetown Islanders	QMJHL	
September 1, 2023	Mitch Reinke	Seattle Kraken	Wilkes-Barre/Scranton Penguins	AHL	
September 13, 2023	Keith Kinkaid	New Jersey Devils	Chicago Wolves	AHL	
September 21, 2023	Djibril Toure	Ottawa Senators	Sudbury Wolves	OHL	
October 5, 2023	Brady Stonehouse	Edmonton Oilers	Ottawa 67's	OHL	
October 6, 2023	Saige Weinstein	Colorado Avalanche	Spokane Chiefs	WHL	
October 16, 2023	Jonah Gadjovich	Florida Panthers	Charlotte Checkers	AHL	
October 31, 2023	Sam Gagner	Edmonton Oilers	Bakersfield Condors	AHL	
November 12, 2023	Joel Kiviranta	Colorado Avalanche	Colorado Eagles	AHL	
November 21, 2023	Dmitri Samorukov	Pittsburgh Penguins	Wilkes-Barre/Scranton Penguins	AHL	
November 25, 2023	Samuel Laberge	New Jersey Devils	Utica Comets	AHL	
November 27, 2023	Justin Bailey	San Jose Sharks	San Jose Barracuda	AHL	
December 19, 2023	Michael Hutchinson	Detroit Red Wings	Grand Rapids Griffins	AHL	
February 4, 2024	Brandon Gignac	Montreal Canadiens	Laval Rocket	AHL	
February 15, 2024	Isaac Poulter	New Jersey Devils	Utica Comets	AHL	
February 15, 2024	Mason Shaw	Minnesota Wild	Iowa Wild	AHL	
February 18, 2024	Justin Brazeau	Boston Bruins	Providence Bruins	AHL	
March 1, 2024	Milo Roelens	Tampa Bay Lightning	Acadie–Bathurst Titan	QMJHL	
March 1, 2024	Zac Funk	Washington Capitals	Prince George Cougars	WHL	
March 2, 2024	Mikael Diotte	New Jersey Devils	Drummondville Voltigeurs	QMJHL	
March 2, 2024	Gabriel Szturc	Tampa Bay Lightning	Kelowna Rockets	WHL	
March 4, 2024	Aaron Dell	Los Angeles Kings	Ontario Reign	AHL	
March 5, 2024	Ivan Ivan	Colorado Avalanche	Colorado Eagles	AHL	
March 6, 2024	Jacob Ingham	Los Angeles Kings	Ontario Reign	AHL	
March 7, 2024	Evan Cormier	Florida Panthers	Charlotte Checkers	AHL	
March 7, 2024	Connor Punnett	Dallas Stars	Oshawa Generals	OHL	
March 8, 2024	Joey Abate	Boston Bruins	Providence Bruins	AHL	
March 8, 2024	Gustavs Grigals	Nashville Predators	Milwaukee Admirals	AHL	
March 12, 2024	Drew Bavaro	Boston Bruins	Notre Dame Fighting Irish	NCAA	
March 14, 2024	Christian Felton	Vancouver Canucks	Merrimack Warriors	NCAA	
March 18, 2024	Connor Ungar	Edmonton Oilers	Brock Badgers	U Sports	
March 18, 2024	Sam Morton	Calgary Flames	Minnesota State Mavericks	NCAA	
March 19, 2024	Luke Krys	Dallas Stars	Providence Friars	NCAA	
March 20, 2024	Justin Hryckowian	Dallas Stars	Northeastern Huskies	NCAA	
March 21, 2024	Tomas Suchanek	Anaheim Ducks	San Diego Gulls	AHL	
March 21, 2024	James Stefan	Edmonton Oilers	Portland Winterhawks	WHL	
March 22, 2024	Cam Thiesing	New York Islanders	Ohio State Buckeyes	NCAA	
March 25, 2024	Ben Steeves	Florida Panthers	Minnesota Duluth Bulldogs	NCAA	
March 25, 2024	Ben Kraws	Dallas Stars	St. Lawrence Saints	NCAA	
March 27, 2024	Lleyton Roed	Seattle Kraken	Bemidji State Beavers	NCAA	
April 1, 2024	Jacob Quillan	Toronto Maple Leafs	Quinnipiac Bobcats	NCAA	
April 2, 2024	Cooper Black	Florida Panthers	Dartmouth Big Green	NCAA	
April 2, 2024	Jaxon Nelson	Boston Bruins	Minnesota Golden Gophers	NCAA	
April 3, 2024	Victor Ostman	Seattle Kraken	Maine Black Bears	NCAA	
April 4, 2024	Collin Graf	San Jose Sharks	Quinnipiac Bobcats	NCAA	
April 4, 2024	Dylan Wendt	New Jersey Devils	Western Michigan Broncos	NCAA	
April 5, 2024	Samuel Hlavaj	Minnesota Wild	HC Skoda Plzen	ELH	
April 8, 2024	Oscar Eklind	Philadelphia Flyers	Lulea HF	SHL	
April 9, 2024	Juha Jaaska	Carolina Hurricanes	HIFK	Liiga	
April 10, 2024	Mikulas Hovorka	Florida Panthers	Motor Ceske Budejovice	ELH	
April 12, 2024	Oliver Okuliar	Florida Panthers	Mountfield HK	ELH	
April 12, 2024	Wilmer Skoog	Florida Panthers	Charlotte Checkers	AHL	
April 14, 2024	Nicolas Mattinen	Toronto Maple Leafs	Straubing Tigers	DEL	
April 15, 2024	Waltteri Ignatjew	Calgary Flames	Mora IK	HA	
April 15, 2024	Arttu Hyry	Dallas Stars	Oulun Karpat	Liiga	
April 29, 2024	Filip Larsson	Pittsburgh Penguins	Leksands IF	SHL	
April 30, 2024	Ryan Schmelzer	New Jersey Devils	Utica Comets	AHL	
April 30, 2024	Samuel Johannesson	St. Louis Blues	Orebro HK	SHL	
April 30, 2024	Marcus Sylvegard	St. Louis Blues	Vaxjo Lakers	SHL	
May 7, 2024	Marcus Hogberg	New York Islanders	Linkoping HC	SHL	
May 16, 2024	Maxim Tsyplakov	New York Islanders	HC Spartak Moscow	KHL	
May 21, 2024	Filip Kral	Pittsburgh Penguins	Lahti Pelicans	Liiga	

== Trades ==
* Retained Salary Transaction: Each team is allowed up to three contracts on their payroll where they have retained salary in a trade (i.e. the player no longer plays with Team A due to a trade to Team B, but Team A still retains some salary). Only up to 50% of a player's contract can be kept, and only up to 15% of a team's salary cap can be taken up by retained salary. A contract can only be involved in one of these trades twice.

Hover over retained salary or conditional transactions for more information.

=== June ===
June 28, 2023	To Colorado Avalanche Ross Colton	To Tampa Bay Lightning MTL 2nd-round pick in 2023
June 28, 2023	To Pittsburgh Penguins Reilly Smith	To Vegas Golden Knights VGK 3rd-round pick in 2024
June 29, 2023	To Chicago Blackhawks Josh Bailey; 2nd-round pick in 2026	To New York Islanders Future considerations (Note: Considerations unknown.)
June 29, 2023	To Detroit Red Wings Klim Kostin; Kailer Yamamoto	To Edmonton Oilers Future considerations
June 29, 2023	To Chicago Blackhawks Corey Perry	To Tampa Bay Lightning 7th-round pick in 2024

==== Pick-only trades ====
June 29, 2023	To Detroit Red Wings 2nd-round pick in 2023 (#47 overall); TBL 5th-round pick in 2023 (#147 overall)	To Nashville Predators VAN 2nd-round pick in 2023 (#43 overall)
June 29, 2023	To Chicago Blackhawks 6th-round pick in 2023 (#167 overall); LAK 2nd-round pick in 2024	To Philadelphia Flyers TBL 2nd-round pick in 2023 (#51 overall)
June 29, 2023	To Carolina Hurricanes CAR 3rd-round pick in 2023 (#94 overall); 4th-round pick in 2023 (#100 overall)	To San Jose Sharks PHI 3rd-round pick in 2023 (#71 overall)
June 29, 2023	To Dallas Stars 3rd-round pick in 2023 (#79 overall)	To Nashville Predators 3rd-round pick in 2024; 6th-round pick in 2024
June 29, 2023	To New York Rangers NJD 3rd-round pick in 2023 (#90 overall)	To Pittsburgh Penguins COL 3rd-round pick in 2023 (#91 overall); 7th-round pick in 2024
June 29, 2023	To Nashville Predators CHI 4th-round pick in 2024	To Tampa Bay Lightning TBL 4th-round pick in 2023 (#115 overall)
June 29, 2023	To San Jose Sharks 7th-round pick in 2025	To Washington Capitals PIT 7th-round pick in 2023 (#206 overall)
June 29, 2023	To Nashville Predators 7th-round pick in 2023 (#218 overall)	To New Jersey Devils 7th-round pick in 2024
June 29, 2023	To Columbus Blue Jackets 7th-round pick in 2023 (#224 overall)	To Vegas Golden Knights 7th-round pick in 2024

=== July ===
July 1, 2023	To Montreal Canadiens MIN 3rd-round pick in 2024; 7th-round pick in 2024	To Washington Capitals Joel Edmundson (50%*)
July 1, 2023	To Dallas Stars 5th-round pick in 2025	To New Jersey Devils Colin Miller
July 1, 2023	To Florida Panthers Steven Lorentz; 5th-round pick in 2025	To San Jose Sharks Anthony Duclair
July 2, 2023	To San Jose Sharks Leon Gawanke	To Winnipeg Jets Artemi Kniazev
July 2, 2023	To Minnesota Wild Maxim Cajkovic; Pat Maroon (20%*)	To Tampa Bay Lightning 7th-round pick in 2024
July 9, 2023	To Detroit Red Wings Alex DeBrincat	To Ottawa Senators Dominik Kubalik; Donovan Sebrango conditional (Note: Ottawa will receive Detroit's choice of Boston's first-round pick in 2024 or their own first-round pick in 2024, if Boston's pick is outside of the top 10; otherwise, if Boston's pick is in the top 10 and they elect to keep the pick, Ottawa will receive Detroit's choice of Boston's first-round pick in 2025 or their own first-round pick in 2024.) BOS 1st-round pick in 2024 or DET 1st-round pick in 2024 or BOS 1st-round pick in 2025; 4th-round pick in 2024

=== August ===
August 6, 2023	To Montreal Canadiens Casey DeSmith; Nathan Legare; Jeff Petry (25%*); 2nd-round pick in 2025	To Pittsburgh Penguins Mike Hoffman; Rem Pitlick
August 6, 2023	To Pittsburgh Penguins Dillon Hamaliuk; Erik Karlsson (13%*); 3rd-round pick in 2026	To San Jose Sharks Mikael Granlund; Mike Hoffman; Jan Rutta conditional (Note: San Jose will receive Pittsburgh's first-round pick in 2024 if it is outside of the top 10; otherwise, San Jose will receive Pittsburgh's first-round pick in 2025.) 1st-round pick in 2024 or 1st-round pick in 2025
August 9, 2023	To Carolina Hurricanes David Kase	To Philadelphia Flyers Massimo Rizzo; 5th-round pick in 2025
August 15, 2023	To Detroit Red Wings Jeff Petry (50%*)	To Montreal Canadiens Gustav Lindstrom conditional (Note: Montreal will receive the later of Boston or Detroit's fourth-round picks in 2025.) 4th-round pick in 2025
August 18, 2023	To Anaheim Ducks Ilya Lyubushkin	To Buffalo Sabres 4th-round pick in 2025

=== September ===
September 13, 2023	To Montreal Canadiens Jakov Novak	To Ottawa Senators Future considerations
September 19, 2023	To Montreal Canadiens Tanner Pearson; 3rd-round pick in 2025	To Vancouver Canucks Casey DeSmith

=== October ===
October 8, 2023	To Toronto Maple Leafs 5th-round pick in 2024	To Vancouver Canucks Sam Lafferty
October 10, 2023	To Carolina Hurricanes Callahan Burke	To Colorado Avalanche Caleb Jones
October 17, 2023	To Pittsburgh Penguins Karel Plasek; Jack Rathbone	To Vancouver Canucks Mark Friedman; Ty Glover

=== November ===
November 8, 2023	To Minnesota Wild Adam Raska; 5th-round pick in 2026	To San Jose Sharks Calen Addison
November 8, 2023	To Minnesota Wild Zach Bogosian	To Tampa Bay Lightning 7th-round pick in 2025
November 26, 2023	To New Jersey Devils Arnaud Durandeau	To New York Islanders Tyce Thompson
November 28, 2023	To Chicago Blackhawks Anthony Beauvillier	To Vancouver Canucks conditional (Note: Vancouver will receive the highest of Chicago's fifth-round picks in 2024.) 5th-round pick in 2024
November 30, 2023	To Calgary Flames conditional (Note: Calgary will receive the highest of Chicago's fifth-round picks in 2024.) 5th-round pick in 2024; 3rd-round pick in 2026	To Vancouver Canucks Nikita Zadorov

=== December ===
December 6, 2023	To Buffalo Sabres Eric Robinson	To Columbus Blue Jackets conditional (Note: Columbus will receive Nashville's seventh-round pick in 2025 if Robinson plays at least 45 games in the 2023-24 season; otherwise no pick will be exchanged.) NSH 7th-round pick in 2025
December 8, 2023	To New York Islanders Robert Bortuzzo	To St. Louis Blues 7th-round pick in 2024
December 15, 2023	To San Jose Sharks Jack Studnicka	To Vancouver Canucks Nick Cicek; 6th-round pick in 2024
December 15, 2023	To Colorado Avalanche 5th-round pick in 2024	To Seattle Kraken Tomas Tatar

=== January ===
January 6, 2024	To Chicago Blackhawks Rem Pitlick	To Pittsburgh Penguins conditional (Note: Pittsburgh will receive Chicago's seventh-round pick in 2026 if Pitlick plays in at least 30 games for the Blackhawks during the 2023-24 regular season; otherwise no pick will be exchanged.) 7th-round pick in 2026
January 8, 2024	To Anaheim Ducks Cutter Gauthier	To Philadelphia Flyers Jamie Drysdale; 2nd-round pick in 2025
January 11, 2024	To Buffalo Sabres Future considerations (Note: Trade was completed when AHL defenseman Chris Jandric was sent from the Rochester Americans to the Laval Rocket in exchange for AHL defenseman Noah Laaouan.)	To Montreal Canadiens Filip Cederqvist
January 25, 2024	To Minnesota Wild Will Butcher	To Pittsburgh Penguins Maxim Cajkovic
January 31, 2024	To Calgary Flames Hunter Brzustewicz; Joni Jurmo; Andrei Kuzmenko; 1st-round pick in 2024 conditional (Note: Calgary will receive Vancouver's third-round pick in 2024 if Vancouver reaches the Western Conference Finals in 2024; otherwise Calgary will receive the better of Vancouver or New Jersey's fourth-round pick in 2024.) 3rd-round pick in 2024 or NJD 4th-round pick in 2024 or VAN 4th-round pick in 2024	To Vancouver Canucks Elias Lindholm

=== February ===
February 2, 2024	To Montreal Canadiens 1st-round pick in 2024 conditional (Note: Montreal will receive Winnipeg's third-round pick in 2027 if Winnipeg wins the Stanley Cup in 2024; otherwise no draft pick will be exchanged.) 3rd-round pick in 2027	To Winnipeg Jets Sean Monahan
February 22, 2024	To Columbus Blue Jackets Alex Nylander conditional (Note: Columbus will receive Pittsburgh's third-round pick in 2026 if Bemstrom scores 6 or more goals for Pittsburgh in the 2023-24 season; otherwise Columbus will receive Pittsburgh's sixth-round pick in 2026.) 3rd-round pick in 2026 or 6th-round pick in 2026	To Pittsburgh Penguins Emil Bemstrom
February 28, 2024	To Calgary Flames Cole Brady	To New Jersey Devils Chris Tanev (50%*)
February 28, 2024	To Dallas Stars Chris Tanev (50%*)	To New Jersey Devils 4th-round pick in 2026
February 28, 2024	To Calgary Flames Artem Grushnikov; 2nd-round pick in 2024 conditional (Note: Calgary will receive Dallas' third-round pick in 2026 if Dallas advances to the 2024 Stanley Cup Finals; otherwise no pick will be exchanged.) 3rd-round pick in 2026	To Dallas Stars Cole Brady
February 29, 2024	To Anaheim Ducks Kirill Slepets	To Carolina Hurricanes Ilya Lyubushkin (50%*)
February 29, 2024	To Carolina Hurricanes 6th-round pick in 2024	To Toronto Maple Leafs Ilya Lyubushkin (50%*)
February 29, 2024	To Anaheim Ducks 3rd-round pick in 2025	To Toronto Maple Leafs Kirill Slepets

=== March ===
March 1, 2024	To Colorado Avalanche Zakhar Bardakov; NSH 7th-round pick in 2024	To New Jersey Devils Kurtis MacDermid
March 5, 2024	To Vegas Golden Knights Anthony Mantha (50%*)	To Washington Capitals 2nd-round pick in 2024; 4th-round pick in 2026
March 6, 2024	To Florida Panthers Vladimir Tarasenko (50%*)	To Ottawa Senators conditional (Note: Ottawa will receive Florida's third-round pick in 2026 if Florida wins the Stanley Cup in 2024; otherwise Ottawa will receive Florida's fourth-round pick in 2024.) 4th-round pick in 2024 or 3rd-round pick in 2026; 3rd-round pick in 2025
March 6, 2024	To Colorado Avalanche Sean Walker; 5th-round pick in 2026	To Philadelphia Flyers Ryan Johansen conditional (Note: Philadelphia will receive Colorado's first-round pick in 2025 if the selection is outside of the top ten; otherwise, Philadelphia will receive Colorado's first-round pick in 2026.) 1st-round pick in 2025 or 1st-round pick in 2026
March 6, 2024	To Buffalo Sabres Bowen Byram	To Colorado Avalanche Casey Mittelstadt
March 6, 2024	To Anaheim Ducks Ty Taylor	To Tampa Bay Lightning Adam Henrique (50%*)
March 6, 2024	To Edmonton Oilers Adam Henrique (50%*)	To Tampa Bay Lightning conditional (Note: Tampa Bay will receive Edmonton's fourth-round pick in 2026 if Edmonton wins the Stanley Cup in 2024; otherwise, Tampa Bay will receive Edmonton's fourth-round pick in 2025.) 4th-round pick in 2025 or 4th-round pick in 2026
March 6, 2024	To Anaheim Ducks 1st-round pick in 2024 conditional (Note: Anaheim will receive Edmonton's fourth-round pick in 2026 if Edmonton wins the Stanley Cup in 2024; otherwise, Anaheim will receive Edmonton's fifth-round pick in 2025.) 4th-round pick in 2025 or 5th-round pick in 2025	To Edmonton Oilers Sam Carrick (50%*); Ty Taylor; 7th-round pick in 2024
March 6, 2024	To New York Rangers Alex Wennberg (50%*)	To Seattle Kraken 2nd-round pick in 2024 conditional (Note: Seattle will receive Dallas' third-round pick in 2025 if New York is in possession of it at the time of the draft (conditionally acquired in a previous trade); otherwise Seattle will receive Dallas' fourth-round pick in 2025.) DAL 3rd-round pick in 2025 or DAL 4th-round pick in 2025
March 6, 2024	To Calgary Flames Mikhail Vorobyev	To Philadelphia Flyers Noah Hanifin (50%*)
March 6, 2024	To Philadelphia Flyers 5th-round pick in 2024	To Vegas Golden Knights Noah Hanifin (50%*)
March 6, 2024	To Calgary Flames Daniil Miromanov conditional (Note: Calgary will receive Vegas' first-round pick in 2026 if Vegas trades their 2025 first-round pick by March 10, 2024, or if the 2025 first-round pick is in the top-10; otherwise Calgary will receive Vegas' first-round pick in 2025.) 1st-round pick in 2025 or 1st-round pick in 2026 conditional (Note: Calgary will receive Vegas' second-round pick in 2024 if Vegas wins at least one Stanley Cup Playoffs round; otherwise Calgary will receive Vegas' third-round pick in 2024.) 2nd-round pick in 2024 or 3rd-round pick in 2024	To Vegas Golden Knights Mikhail Vorobyev
March 7, 2024	To Toronto Maple Leafs Joel Edmundson (50%*)	To Washington Capitals NYI 3rd-round pick in 2024; CHI 5th-round pick in 2025
March 7, 2024	To Anaheim Ducks Jan Mysak	To Montreal Canadiens Jacob Perreault
March 7, 2024	To Arizona Coyotes 4th-round pick in 2027	To Edmonton Oilers Troy Stecher; BOS 7th-round pick in 2024
March 7, 2024	To Colorado Avalanche Brandon Duhaime	To Minnesota Wild 3rd-round pick in 2026
March 7, 2024	To Colorado Avalanche Graham Sward; Yakov Trenin	To Nashville Predators Jeremy Hanzel; 3rd-round pick in 2025
March 7, 2024	To Chicago Blackhawks 5th-round pick in 2024	To Nashville Predators Anthony Beauvillier
March 7, 2024	To Carolina Hurricanes 6th-round pick in 2026	To Toronto Maple Leafs Cade Webber
March 7, 2024	To Calgary Flames Riley Damiani	To Dallas Stars Mathias Emilio Pettersen
March 7, 2024	To San Jose Sharks Jack Thompson; 3rd-round pick in 2024	To Tampa Bay Lightning Anthony Duclair; 7th-round pick in 2025
March 7, 2024	To Carolina Hurricanes Jake Guentzel (25%*); Ty Smith	To Pittsburgh Penguins Michael Bunting; Ville Koivunen; Cruz Lucius; Vasili Ponomarev conditional (Note: Pittsburgh will receive Carolina's first-round pick in 2024 if Carolina advances to the 2024 Stanley Cup Finals; otherwise Pittsburgh will receive Carolina's second-round pick in 2024.) PHI 1st-round pick in 2024 or CAR 2nd-round pick in 2024 conditional (Note: Pittsburgh will receive Carolina's fifth-round pick in 2024 if Carolina wins the Stanley Cup in 2024; otherwise no pick will be exchanged.) 5th-round pick in 2024
March 8, 2024	To Carolina Hurricanes Evgeny Kuznetsov (50%*)	To Washington Capitals 3rd-round pick in 2025
March 8, 2024	To Columbus Blue Jackets Malcolm Subban	To St. Louis Blues Future considerations
March 8, 2024	To Buffalo Sabres Calle Sjalin conditional (Note: Buffalo will receive Florida's fifth-round pick in 2024 if Florida wins the Stanley Cup in 2024; otherwise Buffalo will receive Florida's seventh-round pick in 2024.) 5th-round pick in 2024 or 7th-round pick in 2024	To Florida Panthers Kyle Okposo
March 8, 2024	To Anaheim Ducks Ben Meyers	To Colorado Avalanche 5th-round pick in 2024
March 8, 2024	To New York Rangers Chad Ruhwedel	To Pittsburgh Penguins 4th-round pick in 2027
March 8, 2024	To Boston Bruins Patrick Maroon	To Minnesota Wild Luke Toporowski conditional (Note: Minnesota will receive Boston's sixth-round pick in 2026 if Maroon plays in at least one 2024 playoff game; otherwise no pick will be exchanged.) 6th-round pick in 2026
March 8, 2024	To Arizona Coyotes DAL 6th-round pick in 2024	To Nashville Predators Jason Zucker
March 8, 2024	To Minnesota Wild Turner Elson	To New York Rangers Nic Petan
March 8, 2024	To New Jersey Devils 3rd-round pick in 2024; 2nd-round pick in 2025	To Winnipeg Jets Tyler Toffoli (50%*)
March 8, 2024	To Detroit Red Wings Radim Simek; NJD 7th-round pick in 2024	To San Jose Sharks Klim Kostin
March 8, 2024	To Nashville Predators Wade Allison	To Philadelphia Flyers Denis Gurianov
March 8, 2024	To Buffalo Sabres 4th-round pick in 2024	To Philadelphia Flyers Erik Johnson
March 8, 2024	To Boston Bruins Andrew Peeke	To Columbus Blue Jackets Jakub Zboril; 3rd-round pick in 2027
March 8, 2024	To Arizona Coyotes 5th-round pick in 2027	To Tampa Bay Lightning Matt Dumba; 7th-round pick in 2025
March 8, 2024	To Florida Panthers Magnus Hellberg	To Pittsburgh Penguins Ludovic Waeber conditional (Note: Pittsburgh will receive Florida's seventh-round pick in 2025 if Hellberg plays in at least two 2024 playoff games; otherwise no pick will be exchanged.) 7th-round pick in 2025
March 8, 2024	To Columbus Blue Jackets conditional (Note: Columbus will receive New York's third-round pick in 2026 if the Rangers reach the 2024 Stanley Cup Finals; otherwise Columbus will receive New York's fourth-round pick in 2026.) 3rd-round pick in 2026 or 4th-round pick in 2026	To New York Rangers Jack Roslovic (50%*)
March 8, 2024	To San Jose Sharks David Edstrom; 1st-round pick in 2025	To Vegas Golden Knights Tomas Hertl (17.05%*); 3rd-round pick in 2025; 3rd-round pick in 2027
March 8, 2024	To New Jersey Devils 4th-round pick in 2026	To Winnipeg Jets Colin Miller
March 8, 2024	To Minnesota Wild Dmitry Ovchinnikov; 4th-round pick in 2026	To Toronto Maple Leafs Connor Dewar
March 8, 2024	To Montreal Canadiens conditional (Note: Montreal will receive New Jersey's second-round pick in 2025 if Allen plays in at least forty 2024–25 regular season games and if the club that Allen is a member of qualifies for the 2025 playoffs; otherwise Montreal will receive New Jersey's third-round pick in 2025.) 2nd-round pick in 2025 or 3rd-round pick in 2025	To New Jersey Devils Jake Allen (50%*)
March 8, 2024	To Calgary Flames Nikita Okhotiuk	To San Jose Sharks conditional (Note: San Jose will receive the highest of Chicago's fifth-round picks in 2024.) 5th-round pick in 2024
March 8, 2024	To New Jersey Devils Kaapo Kahkonen	To San Jose Sharks Vitek Vanecek; 7th-round pick in 2025
March 8, 2024	To Buffalo Sabres WSH 7th-round pick in 2025	To San Jose Sharks Devin Cooley
March 11, 2024	To Montreal Canadiens Arnaud Durandeau	To New Jersey Devils Nathan Legare
March 15, 2024	To Ottawa Senators Wyatt Bongiovanni	To Winnipeg Jets Future considerations
March 15, 2024	To Carolina Hurricanes 6th-round pick in 2024	To Ottawa Senators Jamieson Rees

=== May ===
May 21, 2024	To Nashville Predators 7th-round pick in 2024; 2nd-round pick in 2025	To Tampa Bay Lightning Ryan McDonagh; EDM 4th-round pick in 2024

==== Pick-only trades ====
May 24, 2024	To Chicago Blackhawks 1st-round pick in 2024 (#18 overall); 2nd-round pick in 2024 (#50 overall)	To New York Islanders TBL 1st-round pick in 2024 (#20 overall); LAK 2nd-round pick in 2024 (#54 overall); VAN 2nd-round pick in 2024 (#61 overall)

=== June (2024) ===
June 19, 2024	To Calgary Flames Kevin Bahl conditional (Note: Calgary will receive New Jersey's first-round pick in 2025 if the pick is outside of the top 10; otherwise, Calgary will receive New Jersey's first-round pick in 2026.) 1st-round pick in 2025 or 1st-round pick in 2026	To New Jersey Devils Jacob Markstrom (31.25%*)
June 19, 2024	To Dallas Stars WPG 4th-round pick in 2025	To San Jose Sharks Ty Dellandrea
June 19, 2024	To Los Angeles Kings Darcy Kuemper	To Washington Capitals Pierre-Luc Dubois
June 21, 2024	To Minnesota Wild Graeme Clarke	To New Jersey Devils Adam Beckman
June 23, 2024	To Nashville Predators Ozzy Wiesblatt	To San Jose Sharks Egor Afanasyev
June 24, 2024	To Boston Bruins Mark Kastelic; Joonas Korpisalo (25%*); 1st-round pick in 2024	To Ottawa Senators Linus Ullmark
June 25, 2024	To Detroit Red Wings Jesse Kiiskinen; TBL 2nd-round pick in 2024	To Nashville Predators Andrew Gibson
June 25, 2024	To Detroit Red Wings Future considerations	To San Jose Sharks Jake Walman; TBL 2nd-round pick in 2024
June 26, 2024	To Chicago Blackhawks Sam Lafferty; Ilya Mikheyev (15%*); 2nd-round pick in 2027	To Vancouver Canucks 4th-round pick in 2027
June 27, 2024	To Los Angeles Kings Kyle Burroughs	To San Jose Sharks Carl Grundstrom
June 27, 2024	To Calgary Flames COL 2nd-round pick in 2025	To Washington Capitals Andrew Mangiapane

==== Pick-only trades ====
June 27, 2024	To Buffalo Sabres PIT 1st-round pick in 2024 (#14 overall); NJD 2nd-round pick in 2024 (#42 overall)	To San Jose Sharks 1st-round pick in 2024 (#11 overall)

== Waivers ==
Once an NHL player has played in a certain number of games or a set number of seasons has passed since the signing of his first NHL contract (see here), that player must be offered to all of the other NHL teams before he can be assigned to a minor league affiliate.

Date	Player	New team	Previous team	Ref
September 29, 2023	Spencer Martin	Columbus Blue Jackets	Vancouver Canucks	
September 30, 2023	Ty Emberson	San Jose Sharks	New York Rangers	
October 1, 2023	Lassi Thomson	Anaheim Ducks	Ottawa Senators	
October 2, 2023	Samuel Fagemo	Nashville Predators	Los Angeles Kings	
October 2, 2023	Jansen Harkins	Pittsburgh Penguins	Winnipeg Jets	
October 7, 2023	Grigori Denisenko	Vegas Golden Knights	Florida Panthers	
October 9, 2023	A.J. Greer	Calgary Flames	Boston Bruins	
October 9, 2023	John Ludvig	Pittsburgh Penguins	Florida Panthers	
October 9, 2023	Ivan Prosvetov	Colorado Avalanche	Arizona Coyotes	
October 9, 2023	Lassi Thomson	Ottawa Senators	Anaheim Ducks	
October 10, 2023	Ross Johnston	Anaheim Ducks	New York Islanders	
October 21, 2023	Liam Foudy	Nashville Predators	Columbus Blue Jackets	
November 11, 2023	Samuel Fagemo	Los Angeles Kings	Nashville Predators	
November 25, 2023	Mike Reilly	New York Islanders	Florida Panthers	
January 3, 2024	Jaycob Megna	Chicago Blackhawks	Seattle Kraken	
January 4, 2024	Tobias Bjornfot	Vegas Golden Knights	Los Angeles Kings	
January 6, 2024	Zach Sanford	Chicago Blackhawks	Arizona Coyotes	
January 10, 2024	Gustav Lindstrom	Anaheim Ducks	Montreal Canadiens	
January 19, 2024	Spencer Martin	Carolina Hurricanes	Columbus Blue Jackets	
January 25, 2024	Nick DeSimone	New Jersey Devils	Calgary Flames	
January 25, 2024	Adam Ruzicka	Arizona Coyotes	Calgary Flames	
January 29, 2024	Declan Chisholm	Minnesota Wild	Winnipeg Jets	
February 4, 2024	Brayden Pachal	Calgary Flames	Vegas Golden Knights	
February 16, 2024	Matthew Phillips	Pittsburgh Penguins	Washington Capitals	
February 22, 2024	Colin White	Montreal Canadiens	Pittsburgh Penguins	
March 5, 2024	Joel Hanley	Calgary Flames	Dallas Stars	
March 5, 2024	Matthew Phillips	Washington Capitals	Pittsburgh Penguins	
March 7, 2024	Jaret Anderson-Dolan	Nashville Predators	Los Angeles Kings	
March 8, 2024	Tobias Bjornfot	Florida Panthers	Vegas Golden Knights	
March 8, 2024	Boris Katchouk	Ottawa Senators	Chicago Blackhawks	
March 8, 2024	William Lagesson	Anaheim Ducks	Toronto Maple Leafs	
June 19, 2024	Barclay Goodrow	San Jose Sharks	New York Rangers	

== See also ==
- 2023 NHL entry draft
- 2024 NHL entry draft
- 2023 in ice hockey
- 2024 in ice hockey
- 2022–23 NHL transactions
- 2024–25 NHL transactions
