= Tyson Gross =

Canadian ice hockey player (born 2002)

- Born: September 23, 2002 (age 24) Calgary, Alberta, Canada
- Height: 6 ft 3 in (191 cm)
- Weight: 194 lb (88 kg; 13 st 12 lb)
- Position: Centre
- Shoots: Right
- NHL team (P) Cur. team: Calgary Flames; Calgary Wranglers (AHL)
- NHL draft: Undrafted
- Playing career: 2026–present

Tyson Gross (born September 23, 2002) is a Canadian ice hockey forward for the Calgary Wranglers in the American Hockey League (AHL) while under contract to the Calgary Flames of the National Hockey League (NHL).

== Career statistics ==
			Regular season					Playoffs
Season	Team	League	GP	G	A	Pts	PIM	GP	G	A	Pts	PIM
2019–20	Drumheller Dragons	AJHL	4	2	2	4	0	—	—	—	—	—
2020–21	Drumheller Dragons	AJHL	9	2	4	6	6	—	—	—	—	—
2021–22	Fargo Force	USHL	23	4	4	8	10	—	—	—	—	—
2022–23	Cedar Rapids RoughRiders	USHL	54	7	32	39	10	5	1	1	2	2
2023–24	St. Cloud State	NCHC	34	7	13	20	16	—	—	—	—	—
2024–25	St. Cloud State	NCHC	36	9	16	25	37	—	—	—	—	—
2025–26	St. Cloud State	NCHC	36	18	23	41	30	—	—	—	—	—
2025–26	Calgary Flames	NHL	6	1	0	1	2	—	—	—	—	—
NHL totals			6	1	0	1	2	—	—	—	—	—

== Awards and honours ==
Award	Year	Ref
College
AHCA West Second Team All-American	2026	
