= Aidan Thompson =

American ice hockey player (born 2002)

- Born: February 18, 2002 (age 24) Fort Collins, Colorado, U.S.
- Height: 5 ft 11 in (180 cm)
- Weight: 180 lb (82 kg; 12 st 12 lb)
- Position: Forward
- Shoots: Left
- NHL team: New York Rangers
- NHL draft: 90th overall, 2022; Chicago Blackhawks
- Playing career: 2025–present

Aidan Thompson (born February 18, 2002) is an American professional ice hockey player who is a forward for the New York Rangers of the National Hockey League (AHL). He was drafted 90th overall by the Chicago Blackhawks in the 2022 NHL entry draft. He played college ice hockey at Denver.

== Early life ==
Thompson was born to Brad and Jenny Thompson, and has a younger brother, Marek. He attended Berkshire School in Sheffield, Massachusetts where he played ice hockey.

== Playing career ==
=== Junior ===
Thompson played two seasons for the Lincoln Stars. During the 2020–21 season, he recorded 10 goals and 23 assists in 52 games. During the 2021–22 season, he served as alternate captain and recorded 24 goals and 58 assists in 57 games. Following the season he was named to the All-USHL Second team.

=== College ===
Thompson began his collegiate career for the Denver Pioneers during the 2022–23 season. He scored first career goal on November 11, 2022, in a game against North Dakota. During his freshman season he 10 goals and 22 assists in 32 games. His 32 points led all Pioneer freshmen in scoring. During the 2023–24 season, in his sophomore year, he recorded 11 goals and 19 assists in 44 games. He ranked first on the team with 344 faceoff wins, fourth in shots (93), and power-play goals (4). During the championship game of the 2024 NCAA Division I men's ice hockey tournament against Boston College, he won seven of 12 face-offs and helped lead Denver to their record 10th NCAA tournament championship in program history.

On September 27, 2024, he was named an alternate captain for the 2024–25 season. During his junior year he recorded a career-high 21 goals and 34 assists in 44 games, and helped Denver advance to the Frozen Four for the second consecutive year. He ranked second in the NCAA in scoring, trailing his teammate Jack Devine. He began the season on a 14-game point streak, tied for the second-longest by a Pioneer since 2005. In November 2024, he scored six goals and five assists, and led all players in the NCHC with 11 points. He was subsequently named NCHC Player of the Month. Following the season he was named to the All-NCHC Second Team. He finished his collegiate career with 42 goals and 75 assists in 120 games.

=== Professional ===
On April 12, 2025, Thompson signed a two-year, entry-level contract with the Chicago Blackhawks, starting during the 2025–26 season. He also signed a professional tryout with the Blackhawks' AHL affiliate, the Rockford IceHogs for the remainder of the 2024–25 season.

On March 6, 2026, Thompson was traded to the New York Rangers, in exchange for Derrick Pouliot. He was assigned to the Rangers' AHL affiliate Hartford Wolf Pack and picked up 2 assists in his first game with his new team.

He began the 2026-27 season on the Rangers' injured reserve list.

== Playing Style ==
According to University of Denver head coach David Carle, Thompson "got a real good combination of competitiveness and hockey sense and skill. And I also think that allows him to win races on the ice, win puck battles, and when he does get into open ice, he can be very dangerous and cerebral with the puck on his stick." According to hockey writer Brad Schlossman, "He's a really smart player. And sometimes, I feel like smart players work at the next level because they think the game at a level that all the other guys do. So the guys that usually make it, they either have one attribute that's incredibly gifted – whether that be skating, their size or their shot, or else they're really smart players. I think he falls under the fact that he's a really smart player."

== Career statistics ==
			Regular season					Playoffs
Season	Team	League	GP	G	A	Pts	PIM	GP	G	A	Pts	PIM
2018–19	Lincoln Stars	USHL	8	0	1	1	4	—	—	—	—	—
2020–21	Lincoln Stars	USHL	52	10	23	33	12	—	—	—	—	—
2021–22	Lincoln Stars	USHL	57	24	58	82	52	3	0	4	4	2
2022–23	University of Denver	NCHC	32	10	22	32	4	—	—	—	—	—
2023–24	University of Denver	NCHC	44	11	19	30	35	—	—	—	—	—
2024–25	University of Denver	NCHC	44	21	34	55	26	—	—	—	—	—
2024–25	Rockford IceHogs	AHL	4	0	1	1	0	7	2	2	4	2
2025–26	Rockford IceHogs	AHL	40	6	9	15	12	—	—	—	—	—
2025–26	Hartford Wolf Pack	AHL	18	2	5	7	10	—	—	—	—	—
AHL totals			62	8	15	23	22	7	2	2	4	2

== Awards and honors ==
Award	Year	Ref
College
All-NCHC Second Team	2025	
