= Artemi Kniazev =

Russian ice hockey player (born 2001)

- Born: January 4, 2001 (age 25) Kazan, Russia
- Height: 5 ft 11 in (180 cm)
- Weight: 178 lb (81 kg; 12 st 10 lb)
- Position: Defence
- Shoots: Left
- KHL team Former teams: Spartak Moscow; San Jose Sharks; Ak Bars Kazan
- NHL draft: 48th overall, 2019; San Jose Sharks
- Playing career: 2020–present

Artemi Yurevich Kniazev (Russian: Артемий Юрьевич Князев; born 4 January 2001) is a Russian professional ice hockey defenseman currently playing for HC Spartak Moscow of the Kontinental Hockey League (KHL). He was selected by the San Jose Sharks in the 2019 NHL entry draft, and made his NHL debut in 2021. Internationally, Kniyazev played for the Russian national junior team at the 2021 World Junior Championships.

== Playing career ==
Kniazev was drafted by the San Jose Sharks in the 2019 NHL entry draft. He was then signed to a three-year, entry-level contract with the Sharks on July 2, 2019

In the 2021–22 season, Kniazev made his NHL debut with the San Jose Sharks on November 4, 2021, in a 3–5 loss to the St. Louis Blues.

On July 2, 2023, he was traded by the Sharks to the Winnipeg Jets in exchange for the rights to Leon Gawanke.

== Career statistics ==
=== Regular season and playoffs ===
			Regular season					Playoffs
Season	Team	League	GP	G	A	Pts	PIM	GP	G	A	Pts	PIM
2017–18	Irbis Kazan	MHL	39	4	3	7	20	5	0	0	0	0
2018–19	Chicoutimi Saguenéens	QMJHL	55	13	21	34	32	4	0	2	2	8
2019–20	Chicoutimi Saguenéens	QMJHL	51	11	32	43	62	—	—	—	—	—
2020–21	Bars Kazan	VHL	5	1	3	4	2	—	—	—	—	—
2020–21	Irbis Kazan	MHL	2	1	0	1	2	—	—	—	—	—
2020–21	Chicoutimi Saguenéens	QMJHL	14	5	13	18	10	9	4	5	9	8
2021–22	San Jose Barracuda	AHL	60	7	21	28	55	—	—	—	—	—
2021–22	San Jose Sharks	NHL	1	0	0	0	0	—	—	—	—	—
2022–23	San Jose Barracuda	AHL	61	5	23	28	32	—	—	—	—	—
2023–24	Manitoba Moose	AHL	20	0	5	5	18	—	—	—	—	—
2023–24	Ak Bars Kazan	KHL	18	0	0	0	6	—	—	—	—	—
2024–25	Ak Bars Kazan	KHL	40	3	6	9	6	9	0	1	1	4
2025–26	Ak Bars Kazan	KHL	21	1	3	4	10	—	—	—	—	—
2025–26	Spartak Moscow	KHL	12	0	1	1	2	—	—	—	—	—
NHL totals			1	0	0	0	0	—	—	—	—	—
KHL totals			91	4	10	14	24	9	0	1	1	4

=== International ===
Year	Team	Event	Result	GP	G	A	Pts	PIM
2017	Russia	U17	5th	5	1	2	3	4
2018	Russia	IH18	3rd place, bronze medalist(s)	5	0	0	0	0
2021	Russia	WJC	4th	7	1	3	4	10
Junior totals				17	2	5	7	14
