= Dylan Wendt =

American ice hockey player (born 2001)

- Born: January 9, 2001 (age 25) Grand Haven, Michigan, U.S.
- Height: 6 ft 1 in (185 cm)
- Weight: 185 lb (84 kg; 13 st 3 lb)
- Position: Forward
- Shoots: Right
- team Former teams: Free agent Utica Comets
- NHL draft: Undrafted
- Playing career: 2024–present

Dylan Wendt (born January 9, 2001) is an American professional ice hockey forward who is currently an unrestricted free agent. He most recently played for the Utica Comets of the American Hockey League (AHL) while under contract to the New Jersey Devils of the National Hockey League (NHL).

== Playing career ==
Wendt played junior ice hockey in the United States Hockey League (USHL), where he was drafted in 2018 by the Green Bay Gamblers. In the 2018–19 season, he recorded three goals and 18 points in 58 games. Early in the 2019–20 season, he was traded to the Muskegon Lumberjacks for defenseman John Prokop. He was later named the Lumberjacks' captain. Although he initially committed to the University of Michigan, he changed his commitment to Western Michigan University in 2020.

As a freshman in the 2021–22 season, Wendt totaled just three points in 38 games, with his first of two goals coming against his former commitment, the University of Michigan.

In his sophomore season in 2022–23, Wendt's production improved to eight goals and 22 points, playing in all of Western Michigan's 39 games and earning the team award for Most Improved Player.

In the 2023–24 season, Wendt ranked second on the Broncos with 23 goals and 44 points in 38 games, including a seven game point streak through November and December. He led Western Michigan with nine power play goals and four game-winning goals, and was nominated for the Hobey Baker Award.

Wendt signed a two-year, entry-level contract with the New Jersey Devils of the National Hockey League (NHL) on April 4, 2024. He also signed an amateur tryout contract for the remainder of the 2023–24 season with their American Hockey League (AHL) affiliate, the Utica Comets. He recorded his first professional point, an assist, on April 7, 2024, in his AHL debut against the Toronto Marlies. His first professional goal came on April 20, against the Syracuse Crunch.

== Personal life ==
Wendt graduated from Ashwaubenon High School before studying business at Western Michigan University. His uncle and cousin both played college ice hockey at Ferris State University.

== Career statistics ==
			Regular season					Playoffs
Season	Team	League	GP	G	A	Pts	PIM	GP	G	A	Pts	PIM
2018–19	Green Bay Gamblers	USHL	58	3	15	18	16	—	—	—	—	—
2019–20	Green Bay Gamblers	USHL	9	2	2	4	8	—	—	—	—	—
2019–20	Muskegon Lumberjacks	USHL	35	6	24	30	17	—	—	—	—	—
2020–21	Muskegon Lumberjacks	USHL	53	17	28	45	19	4	0	4	4	2
2021–22	Western Michigan University	NCHC	34	2	1	3	4	—	—	—	—	—
2022–23	Western Michigan University	NCHC	39	8	14	22	4	—	—	—	—	—
2023–24	Western Michigan University	NCHC	38	23	21	44	10	—	—	—	—	—
2023–24	Utica Comets	AHL	5	1	1	2	2	—	—	—	—	—
2024–25	Utica Comets	AHL	12	1	2	3	0	—	—	—	—	—
2024–25	Adirondack Thunder	ECHL	43	9	19	28	16	—	—	—	—	—
2025–26	Adirondack Thunder	ECHL	30	9	12	21	4	6	0	1	1	0
2025–26	Utica Comets	AHL	19	0	3	3	9	—	—	—	—	—
AHL totals			36	2	6	8	11	—	—	—	—	—
