= Jack Devine (ice hockey, born 2003) =

American ice hockey player (born 2003)

- Born: October 1, 2003 (age 23) Glencoe, Illinois, U.S.
- Height: 5 ft 11 in (180 cm)
- Weight: 173 lb (78 kg; 12 st 5 lb)
- Position: Right wing
- Shoots: Right
- NHL team (P) Cur. team: Florida Panthers; Charlotte Checkers (AHL)
- NHL draft: 221st overall, 2022; Florida Panthers
- Playing career: 2025–present

Jack Devine (born October 1, 2003) is an American ice hockey right wing for the Charlotte Checkers of the American Hockey League (AHL) as a prospect for the Florida Panthers of the National Hockey League (NHL). He was drafted 221st overall by the Panthers in the 2022 NHL entry draft. He played college ice hockey at Denver.

== Early life ==
Devine attended New Trier High School in Winnetka, Illinois, before moving to Michigan when he was selected to play for the USA Hockey National Team Development Program.

== Playing career ==
=== Junior ===
Devine played two seasons for the USA Hockey National Team Development Program. During the 2019–20 season, he recorded 13 goals and 31 assists in 49 games for the Under-17 team, and six goals and 20 assists in 29 USHL games. During the 2020–21 season, he recorded nine goals and 11 assists in 30 games for the Under-18 team, and one goal and seven assists in 13 USHL games.

=== College ===
Devine began his collegiate career for the Denver Pioneers during the 2021–22 season. He made his collegiate debut on October 8, 2021, in a game against Arizona State and recorded his first career point, an assist in the season opener. He scored first career goal on December 3, 2021, in a game against Arizona State. He finished the weekend series with one goal and three assists and was named NCHC Rookie of the Week for the week ending December 6, 2021. He was again named NCHC Rookie of the Week for the week ending January 3, 2022, after he scored four points during a weekend series against Alaska. During his freshman season he was the youngest player on Denver's roster and recorded three goals and 16 assists in 36 games and helped lead Denver to their ninth NCAA tournament championship in program history.

During the 2022–23 season, in his sophomore year, he recorded 14 goals and 17 assists in 38 games. He tied for second on the team with four game-winning goals and ranked third on the team in goals. He was named the NCHC Forward of the Week for the week ending February 20, 2023, after he scored three goals and four assists in two games against Minnesota Duluth.

During the 2023–24 season, in his junior year, he recorded a career-high 27 goals and 29 assists in 44 games and helped lead Denver to their record tenth NCAA tournament championship. He led Denver in scoring and ranked fourth in the nation with 27 goals. His 27 goals are the most by a Denver player since Ryan Dingle also had 27 goals in 2006. In conference play, he ranked third in scoring and second among forwards with 28 points in 24 games. Following the season he was named a finalist for the NCHC Player of the Year and NCHC Forward of the Year, a All-NCHC First Team honoree and an AHCA West First Team All-American. He was also named a top-ten finalist for the Hobey Baker Award.

During the 2024–25 season, in his senior year, he recorded 13 goals and 44 assists in 44 games, and was the NCAA scoring champion. Following the season he was named an All-NCHC First Team honoree and an AHCA West First Team All-American for the second consecutive year. He was also named a top-ten finalist for the Hobey Baker Award. He finished his collegiate career with 57 goals and 106 assists in 162 games.

=== Professional ===
On April 12, 2025, Devine signed a three-year, entry-level contract with the Florida Panthers, starting during the 2025–26 season. He also signed a professional tryout with the Panthers' AHL affiliate, the Charlotte Checkers for the remainder of the 2024–25 season.

== International play ==
Devine represented the United States at the 2019 World U-17 Hockey Challenge where he recorded one goal and four assists in six games and won a silver medal.

Devine represented the United States at the 2021 IIHF World U18 Championships where he recorded one assist in five games.

== Personal life ==
Devine was born to Valerie and Ted Devine, and has two older sisters, Taylor and Katie. Katie played college ice hockey at Saint Mary's University of Minnesota from 2019 to 2023.

== Career statistics ==
=== Regular season and playoffs ===
			Regular season					Playoffs
Season	Team	League	GP	G	A	Pts	PIM	GP	G	A	Pts	PIM
2019–20	U.S. National Development Team	USHL	29	6	20	26	28	—	—	—	—	—
2020–21	U.S. National Development Team	USHL	13	1	7	8	2	—	—	—	—	—
2021–22	University of Denver	NCHC	36	3	16	19	16	—	—	—	—	—
2022–23	University of Denver	NCHC	38	14	17	31	19	—	—	—	—	—
2023–24	University of Denver	NCHC	44	27	29	56	20	—	—	—	—	—
2024–25	University of Denver	NCHC	44	13	44	57	32	—	—	—	—	—
2024–25	Charlotte Checkers	AHL	3	0	2	2	0	7	2	3	5	2
2025–26	Charlotte Checkers	AHL	63	18	25	43	57	3	0	2	2	2
2025–26	Florida Panthers	NHL	6	0	0	0	2	—	—	—	—	—
NHL totals			6	0	0	0	2	—	—	—	—	—

=== International ===
Year	Team	Event	Result	GP	G	A	Pts	PIM
2021	United States	U18	5th	5	0	1	1	4
Junior totals				5	0	1	1	4

== Awards and honors ==
Award	Year
College
All-NCHC First Team	2024, 2025
AHCA West First Team All-American	2024, 2025

Awards and achievements
Preceded by Will Smith	NCAA Ice Hockey Scoring Champion; 2024–25	Succeeded by Incumbent
