= Scott Perunovich =

American ice hockey player (born 1998)

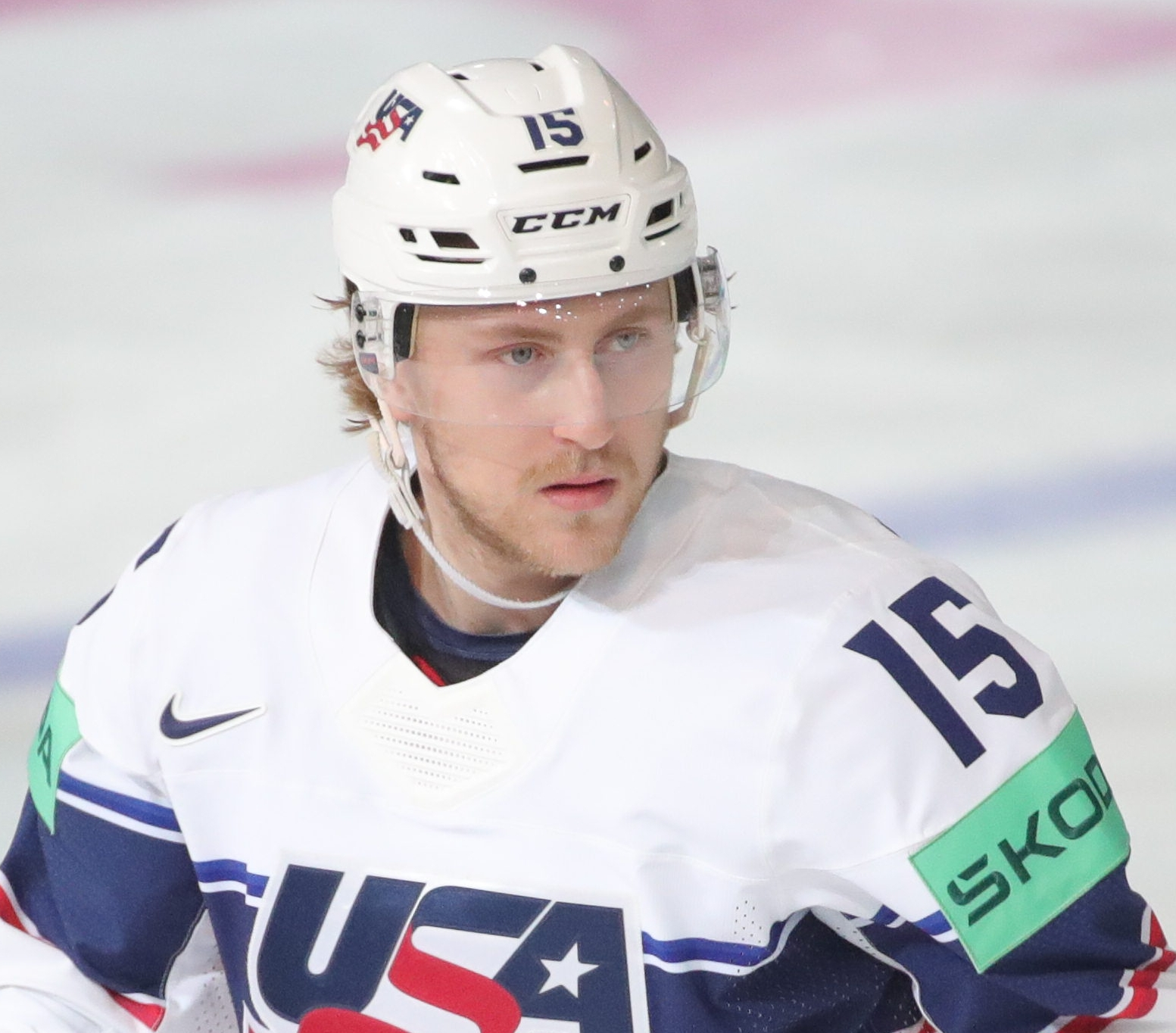
- Perunovich with Team USA in 2023
- Born: August 18, 1998 (age 28) Hibbing, Minnesota, U.S.
- Height: 5 ft 10 in (178 cm)
- Weight: 172 lb (78 kg; 12 st 4 lb)
- Position: Defense
- Shoots: Left
- NHL team (P) Cur. team Former teams: Los Angeles Kings; Ontario Reign (AHL); St. Louis Blues; New York Islanders
- National team: United States
- NHL draft: 45th overall, 2018; St. Louis Blues
- Playing career: 2021–present

Scott Douglas Perunovich (born August 18, 1998) is an American professional ice hockey player. He is a defenseman for the Ontario Reign of the American Hockey League (AHL), under contract to the Los Angeles Kings of the National Hockey League (NHL). He was drafted by the St. Louis Blues in the second round, 45th overall, in the 2018 NHL entry draft.

While playing with the University of Minnesota Duluth, Perunovich was named to the AHCA East First-Team All-American, the NCHC First All-Conference Team, All-Tournament Team, and NCHC All-Rookie team. He won several awards for his outstanding play, including the NCHC Offensive Defenseman of the Year, NCHC Rookie of the Year and Hobey Baker Award.

Internationally, Perunovich has represented the United States at the 2015 Ivan Hlinka Memorial Tournament, where they finished in fifth place, and the 2018 World Junior Ice Hockey Championships, winning a bronze medal.

== Personal life ==
Perunovich was born to Jim and Susan Perunovich on August 18, 1998, in Hibbing, Minnesota. He is of Montenegrin descent. Perunovich's paternal great-grandparents Nikola (Nicholas) and Stana (Stella) Perunović immigrated to Hibbing from Montenegro; Nikola was a descendant of the Pješivci tribe, and Perunovich's ancestors had fought against the invading colonial Ottoman Empire. He began figure skating lessons at the age of four before eventually joining a hockey team. Although his uncle Doug Torrel played for the University of Minnesota-Duluth Bulldogs from 1988 to 1992 and was drafted by the Vancouver Canucks in the 1987 NHL entry draft, Perunovich was attracted to the school due to the team's success.

== Playing career ==
Perunovich attended Hibbing High School from 2014 to 2017, during which he played three seasons of prep school hockey and tennis. While playing for the Hibbing High School Bluejackets Bantam A team in 2014, he was drafted by the Cedar Rapids RoughRiders of the United States Hockey League (USHL). He opted to continue to play for Hibbing High School, where he led the team to a 37–10–5 record and was named a finalist for Bantam Player Of the Year.

In 2015, Perunovich committed to play Division 1 hockey for the University of Minnesota–Duluth Bulldogs starting in the 2017–18 season. Team USA head coach Derek Plante, who had helped Duluth recruit Perunovich, called him a "very crafty, a smart hockey player." The 2015–16 season proved to be one of his best both on the ice and tennis court. As a sophomore and junior, Perunovich and Jake Jolowsky won the Section 7A doubles title and qualified for the Minnesota high school boys tennis state tournament for a third consecutive season. Overall, he won 80 percent of his matches and was named the Mesabi Daily News, Hibbing Daily Tribune, and Grand Rapids Herald Review Tennis Player of the Year. In January 2016, Perunovich joined the U.S. National Under-18 Team for two games against St. Cloud State. After his senior year, Perunovich then played one season with the Cedar Rapids RoughRiders during which he struggled being away from home and recorded the worst plus-minus in the league.

=== Collegiate ===
Perunovich played for the University of Minnesota–Duluth Bulldogs from 2017 to 2020, where he enrolled in the College of Liberal Arts, majoring in communications. Perunovich played 42 games for the Bulldogs during the 2017–18 season and recorded his first collegiate goal in a 4–3 loss to Michigan Tech on October 7, 2017. Perunovich ended his freshman season with 36 points, tying fourth nationally among all defenseman and third for freshman. As a result of his outstanding play, Perunovich was named an AHCA East First-Team All-American, NCHC First All-Conference Team, NCHC All-Rookie team, All-Tournament Team, NCHC Offensive Defenseman of the Year, and NCHC Rookie of the Year. He was the first Minnesota–Duluth Bulldog to be named Rookie of the Year and Offensive Defenseman of the Year and set a new Bulldogs record for most points by a freshman defenceman. His prolific freshman season helped the Bulldogs win the NCAA National Championship title and he was named to the NCAA Frozen Four All–Tournament Team. He was also the first NCHC player to be awarded the Tim Taylor Award as men's Division I National Rookie of the Year.

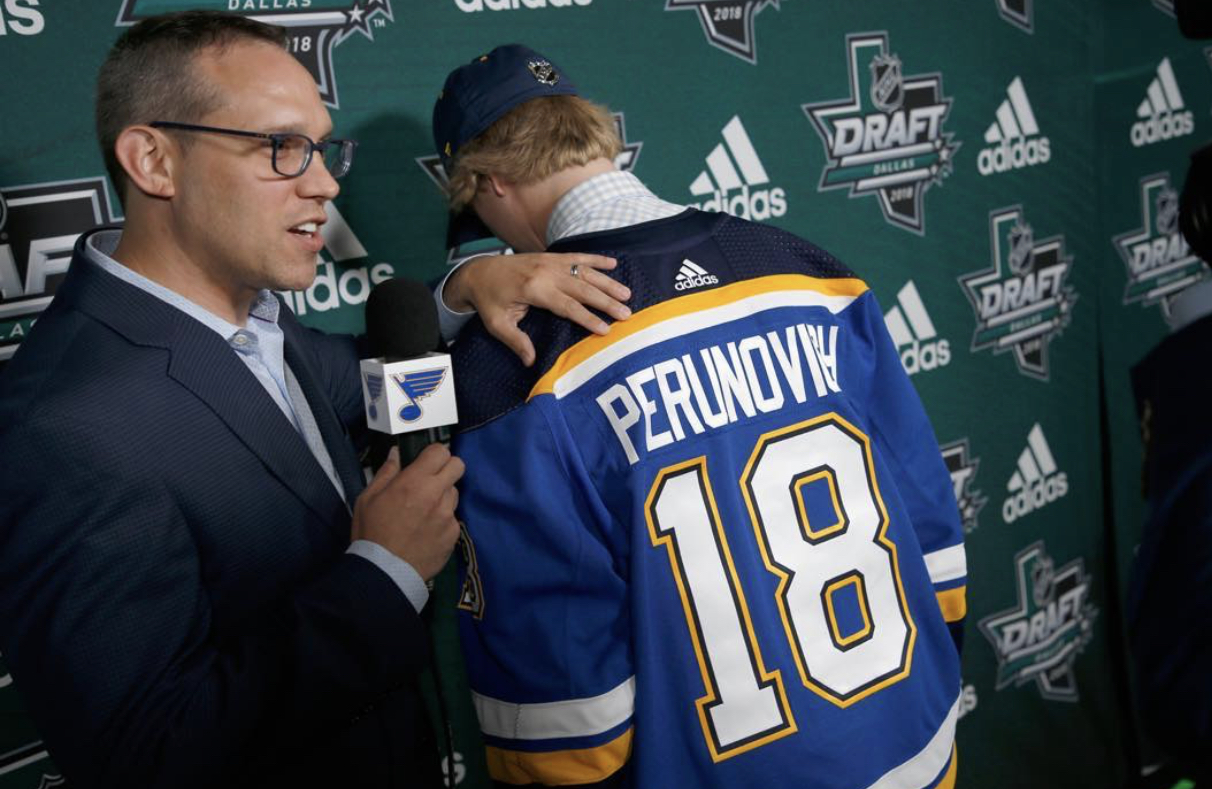
Perunovich with Andy Strickland (left) at the 2018 NHL entry draft

Perunovich's strong play during his rookie season earned him a midterm ranking by the NHL Central Scouting Bureau, for an eventual final rank of 102nd overall for North American Skaters eligible for the 2018 NHL entry draft. When asked to compare his skating, Perunovich says he models his game after NHL defenseman Torey Krug. Bulldogs coach Scott Sandelin also often referred to him as a "fourth forward." After he had been passed over in his first two years of eligibility, the St. Louis Blues drafted Perunovich in the second round of the draft on the word of their scouts, Keith Tkachuk and J Niemiec, that he was worth the chance.

Perunovich returned to the Bulldogs for his sophomore season. On October 23, 2018, Perunovich was named the NCAA First Star of the Week after he recorded six points in two back-to-back games against the Maine Black Bears. On January 17, 2019, Perunovich was nominated for the Hobey Baker Award and later for the Offensive Defenseman of the Year. Perunovich helped lead the Bulldogs to the 2019 NCHC Tournament with 27 points, where they competed in the first round against the Omaha Mavericks. On March 13, Perunovich was again selected for the NCHC First All-Conference Team. Although the Bulldogs won the first game of the series against Omaha, Perunovich was forced to sit out due to injury. After returning to the ice, Perunovich helped the Bulldogs defeat St. Cloud State 3–2 to qualify for the NCAA Championship. He was also named the winner of NCHC Offensive Defenseman of the Year for the second consecutive season. In the first round of the 2019 NCAA Championship, Minnesota-Duluth beat Bowling Green State University 2–1 in overtime to advance to the second round where they faced the Quinnipiac Bobcats. On March 31, the Bulldogs qualified for the Frozen Four with Perunovich recording an assist in the 3–1 win over the Quinnipiac Bobcats. After beating the Providence Friars 4–1, Perunovich was named an AHCA East Second-Team All-American. On April 13, the Bulldogs went on to clinch another NCAA Championship title after a 3–0 win over the UMass Minutemen.

On July 28, 2019, Perunovich committed to another year with the Bulldogs and proved once again to be an asset to the team. During his junior season, Perunovich ranked second in the National Collegiate Hockey Association (NCHA) in assists with 34 and becoming the first defenceman to lead the NCHA in scoring. After his collegiate season was suspended due to COVID-19 pandemic, Perunovich signed a contract with the St. Louis Blues allowing him to play with the team if the NHL season continues. He was later announced the winner of the 2020 Hobey Baker Award for being the top National Collegiate Athletic Association men's ice hockey player and NCHC Offensive Defenseman of the Year for the third consecutive season. Perunovich became the sixth Bulldogs player in the team's history to receive the Hobey Baker Award.

=== Professional ===
Following the conclusion of his junior year with the Bulldogs, Perunovich ended his collegiate career by agreeing to a two-year, entry-level contract with his drafting club, the St. Louis Blues, on March 28, 2020. He was re-assigned to the Blues' American Hockey League (AHL) affiliate, the Utica Comets, to begin the 2020–21 season. In February, it was announced that Perunovich would miss most of the season while recovering from shoulder surgery.

In September 2021, Perunovich was named team captain of the St. Louis Blues Prospects Team during the NHL's prospect tournament in Traverse City. Following the tournament, he competed with the Blues during their preseason games. Prior to the start of the 2021–22 season, Perunovich was re-assigned to their AHL affiliate, the Springfield Thunderbirds.

Perunovich made his NHL debut with the Blues on November 18, 2021 in a game against the San Jose Sharks, scoring his first NHL point with an assist.

On June 24, 2023, as a restricted free agent, Perunovich was signed to a one-year, $775,000 contract extension with the Blues.

During the 2024–25 season, Perunovich's play was unable to solidify a role within the defensive corps on the Blues, primarily serving in a third-pairing role when inserted into the lineup and registering 2 goals and 6 points in 24 appearances. On January 27, 2025, Perunovich was traded by the Blues to the New York Islanders in exchange for a conditional fifth-round pick in 2026.

As a free agent from the Islanders, Perunovich returned to the Central Division in signing a one-year, two-way contract with the Utah Mammoth for the 2025–26 season on July 1, 2025.

Leaving the Mammoth at the conclusion of his contract without featuring for the club, Perunovich was signed as a free agent to a one-year, two-way contract with the Los Angeles Kings on July 1, 2026.

== International play ==
Medal record

Representing United States

Ice hockey

World Junior Championships
Bronze medal – third place	2018 United States	

Perunovich has represented the United States at various international tournaments at the junior level. In 2015, he was invited to participate with Team USA at the 2015 Ivan Hlinka Memorial Tournament, where they finished in fifth place.

In December 2017, Perunovich was selected for the United States men's national junior ice hockey team preliminary roster prior to the 2018 World Junior Ice Hockey Championships. After making the final cut, he scored one goal and two assists during the tournament to help Team USA win a bronze medal. His only goal of the tournament came during the first outdoor World Juniors game to eliminate a two-goal deficit and beat Team Canada 4–3.

== Career statistics ==
=== Regular season and playoffs ===
			Regular season					Playoffs
Season	Team	League	GP	G	A	Pts	PIM	GP	G	A	Pts	PIM
2016–17	Cedar Rapids RoughRiders	USHL	56	6	15	21	14	—	—	—	—	—
2017–18	University of Minnesota–Duluth	NCHC	42	11	25	36	36	—	—	—	—	—
2018–19	University of Minnesota–Duluth	NCHC	39	3	26	29	32	—	—	—	—	—
2019–20	University of Minnesota–Duluth	NCHC	34	6	34	40	64	—	—	—	—	—
2021–22	St. Louis Blues	NHL	19	0	6	6	8	7	0	4	4	0
2021–22	Springfield Thunderbirds	AHL	17	3	19	22	8	—	—	—	—	—
2022–23	Springfield Thunderbirds	AHL	22	2	18	20	12	2	0	0	0	0
2023–24	St. Louis Blues	NHL	54	0	17	17	12	—	—	—	—	—
2024–25	St. Louis Blues	NHL	24	2	4	6	6	—	—	—	—	—
2024–25	New York Islanders	NHL	11	0	3	3	4	—	—	—	—	—
2025–26	Tucson Roadrunners	AHL	64	9	40	49	54	—	—	—	—	—
NHL totals			108	2	30	32	30	7	0	4	4	0

=== International ===
Year	Team	Event	Result	GP	G	A	Pts	PIM
2015	United States	IH18	5th	4	0	0	0	2
2018	United States	WJC	3rd place, bronze medalist(s)	7	1	2	3	2
2023	United States	WC	4th	10	1	7	8	0
Junior totals				11	1	2	3	4
Senior totals				10	1	7	8	0

== Awards and honors ==
Award	Year	Ref
USHS
All-USA Hockey First Team	2016	
College
AHCA West First Team All–American	2018, 2020	
NCHC First All-Conference Team	2018, 2019	
All–Tournament Team	2018	
NCHC All–Rookie Team	2018	
NCHC Offensive Defenseman of the Year	2018, 2019, 2020	
NCHC Rookie of the Year	2018	
Tim Taylor Award	2018	
AHCA West Second Team All-American	2019	
Hobey Baker Award	2020	

Awards and achievements
Preceded by Henrik Borgström	NCHC Rookie of the Year; 2017–18	Succeeded by Taylor Ward
Preceded by Will Butcher	NCHC Offensive Defenseman of the Year; 2017–18, 2018–19, 2019–20	Succeeded by Ronnie Attard
Preceded by Clayton Keller	Tim Taylor Award; 2017–18	Succeeded by Joel Farabee
Preceded by Jimmy Schuldt	NCHC Player of the Year; 2019–20	Succeeded by Shane Pinto
Preceded by Cale Makar	Hobey Baker Award; 2019–20	Succeeded by Cole Caufield
Preceded by Hunter Shepard	NCHC Three Stars Award; 2019–20; With: Jordan Kawaguchi	Succeeded by Ludvig Persson
