= Shane Pinto =

American ice hockey player (born 2000)

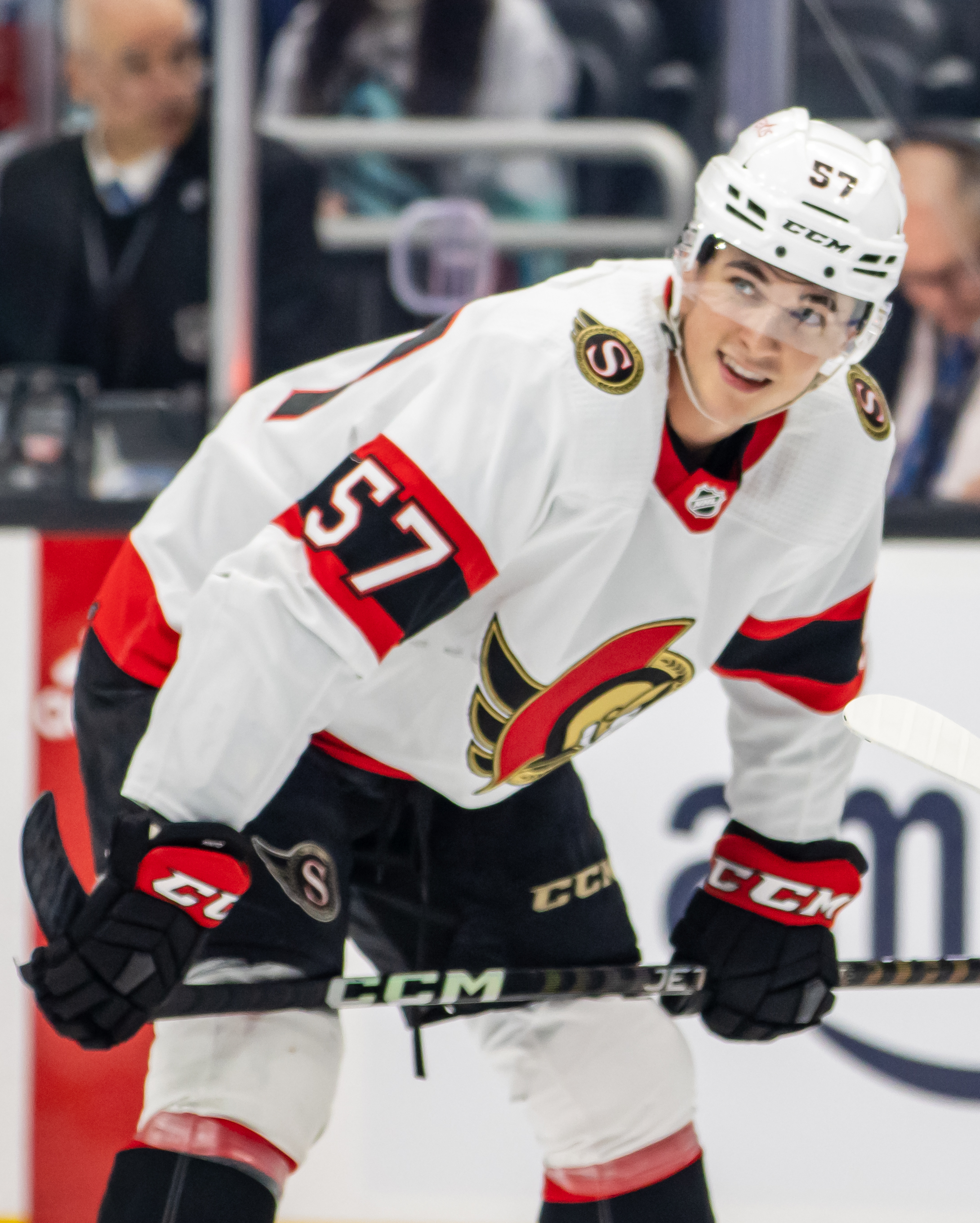
- Pinto with the Ottawa Senators in 2023
- Born: November 12, 2000 (age 25) Franklin Square, New York, U.S.
- Height: 6 ft 3 in (191 cm)
- Weight: 206 lb (93 kg; 14 st 10 lb)
- Position: Center
- Shoots: Right
- NHL team: Ottawa Senators
- National team: United States
- NHL draft: 32nd overall, 2019; Ottawa Senators
- Playing career: 2021–present

Shane Pinto (born November 12, 2000) is an American professional ice hockey player who is a center for the Ottawa Senators of the National Hockey League (NHL). He was drafted 32nd overall by the Senators, the first pick in the second round of the 2019 NHL entry draft.

== Early life ==
Pinto was born November 12, 2000, in Franklin Square, New York. He grew up in an athletic household: his father Frank grew up playing baseball, while his mother Catherine and older sister Brianna both played softball. Pinto began ice skating at the age of seven and joined his first organized hockey team two years later, but he preferred baseball and American football to ice hockey. He did not decide to focus on hockey until the age of 14, when Pinto suffered a clavicle fracture during football practice that left him temporarily unable to play another sport.

Pinto spent most of his minor ice hockey career with the Brooklyn Aviators, a second-tier team in the United States Premier Hockey League (USPHL). At the age of 12, he helped lead his Aviators team to a state championship. After four years at H. Frank Carey Junior-Senior High School in Franklin Square, Pinto left for South Kent School in Connecticut for his junior and senior year to further his ice hockey career. In his final season there, he recorded 34 goals and 31 assists for 65 points in 54 games and was part of the 2018 USA Hockey National Championship team.

== Playing career ==
=== Junior ===
After the 2016–17 season, Pinto was drafted in the 21st round, 330th overall, by the Lincoln Stars of the United States Hockey League (USHL). He then joined the USHL for the 2018–19 regular season where he quickly began producing for the Stars. Through his first 30 games in the league, Pinto tallied 17 goals and 15 assists for 32 points while also leading all rookies with six power play goals. In January 2019, Pinto was traded to the Tri-City Storm in exchange for Michael Colella, a 2019 third-round Phase II draft pick, a 2020 second-round Phase II draft pick, and future considerations. The Storm earned the second Anderson Cup in franchise history after setting a new record for wins and qualified for the playoffs. They advanced to the Western Conference Finals where they were eliminated by the Sioux Falls Stampede. In six playoff games, he tallied five goals and nine points. Pinto was named to the USHL all-rookie first team in 2019 after leading all first-year players with 59 points in 59 games.

=== Collegiate ===
Pinto committed to playing the 2019–20 season with the North Dakota Fighting Hawks and was considered the top recruit for that year's incoming freshman class. In his first season he recorded 16 goals and 28 points in 33 games. However, the season was ended on March 12, 2020, due to the COVID-19 pandemic. In the pandemic-shortened 2020–21 season, he marked 15 goals and 32 points in 28 games. North Dakota won the Penrose Cup as champions of the National Collegiate Hockey Conference (NCHC) in his sophomore season and advanced to the 2021 NCAA Division I men's ice hockey tournament. They were eliminated by the Minnesota Duluth Bulldogs in the regional round, in the longest game in tournament history, going to five overtime periods. After the season, Pinto was named the NCHC's first unanimous Player of the Year, also the first in the team's history. He was also named the NCHC's Forward of the Year, Defensive Forward of the Year and to the All-Conference First All-Star Team.

=== Professional ===
Pinto was selected by the Ottawa Senators of the National Hockey League (NHL) in the second round, 32nd overall, of the 2019 NHL entry draft. During his first development camp with the Senators, Pinto impressed scouts with his play. Pinto concluded his collegiate career by signing a three-year, entry-level contract with the Ottawa Senators on April 1, 2021. After undergoing the mandatory quarantining period, Pinto made his NHL debut late in the 2020–21 season and scored his first goal on May 5, 2021, against the Montreal Canadiens against Jake Allen. He finished the season tallying one goal and six assists. Pinto later participated in rookie camp a few months later in September, where he was appointed team captain for one game. Pinto missed nearly the entire 2021–22 season due to injuries. During his fourth game of the year, he was hit into the boards by Mario Ferraro of the San Jose Sharks and left with a shoulder injury. He attempted to return nine games later against the Pittsburgh Penguins but re-injured the same shoulder while taking a faceoff. He ended up having surgery and missed the rest of the year. He recorded one assist in five games that season. Pinto recovered on time to start the 2022–23 season and got off to a hot start. In October he was named the NHL's rookie of the month after scoring six goals in eight games. He finished the season with 20 goals and 35 points in 82 games.

As a restricted free agent, a contract dispute led Pinto to miss the entire 2023 training camp and the first weeks of the 2023–24 season. On October 26, 2023, the NHL suspended Pinto 41 games for violating the league's rules on sports gambling. Although the NHL indicated that no evidence was found on him of wagering on NHL games, the suspension (one of the longest in league history), was the result of a negotiation between Pinto, the NHL Players' Association, and the league, and was not the result of a formal disciplinary process; Pinto subsequently released a statement apologizing for his infraction. Pinto had been under investigation since the early summer, after an NHL betting partner had flagged issues with Pinto's account details with the league, and Pinto had also been reported to have had connections with a third-party proxy bettor. As a result of the suspension, Pinto was not allowed to return to the Senators' lineup until January 21, 2024. On January 19, 2024, Pinto signed a one-year contract with the Senators. He returned to the Senators lineup on January 21 against the Philadelphia Flyers and picked up his first point of the season in a 5–3 victory for Ottawa. He tallied a three-point game on February 10, scoring once and assisting on two others by Ridly Greig and Vladimir Tarasenko in a 5–3 victory over the Toronto Maple Leafs. On March 27, he marked a four-point game, scoring once and assisting on goals by Drake Batherson, Brady Tkachuk, and Jakob Chychrun in a 6–2 win over the Buffalo Sabres.

In the 2024–25 season he mostly saw time on the team's third line alongside Michael Amadio and Greig, often matched against the opponent's top line. The line was often Ottawa's most consistent during the season and on December 21, 2024, he recorded a three-point game, scoring twice and assisting on another by Jake Sanderson in a 5–4 victory over the Vancouver Canucks. In 70 games, he tallied 21 goals and 37 points. The Senators qualified for the playoffs and faced the Toronto Maple Leafs in the opening round. Pinto made his NHL playoff debut in Game 1 on April 20, 2025, and recorded his first playoff point when assisted on Greig's goal in the 6–2 loss. He scored his first NHL playoff goal in Game 4 on April 26, a shorthanded effort in a 4–3 victory. The Senators, however, were eliminated in six games in their best-of-seven series. In the six games, Pinto tallied one goal and two points.

Pinto was again centering the third line with Amadio and now Claude Giroux on his wings for the 2025–26 season. He opened the season with a three-point effort, scoring twice and assisting on Giroux's game-winning goal in a 5–4 victory over the Tampa Bay Lightning on October 9. On November 13, he signed a four-year, $30 million extension with the Ottawa Senators. On March 7, he marked another three-point night, scoring once and assisting on goals by Amadio and Tyler Kleven in a 7–4 win over the Seattle Kraken. In 72 games, he scored 23 goals and 46 points. The Senators made the playoffs again, but were swept in the first round by the Carolina Hurricanes. Pinto went scoreless in the four games.

== International play ==
Medal record

Representing United States

Ice hockey

World Championships
Gold medal – first place	2025 Sweden/Denmark	

Pinto was named to the United States men's national junior ice hockey team for the 2020 World Junior Ice Hockey Championships. Pinto enjoyed early success for the team, being named the player of the game for the opening game of the tournament against Canada men's national junior ice hockey team after scoring two goals and getting an assist.

Pinto represented the United States at the 2025 IIHF World Championship, where he recorded two goals and eight assists in eight games and helped Team USA win their first gold medal since 1933.

== Personal life ==
Pinto is a golf aficionado who has played on the Bethpage Black Course. Growing up in New York, Pinto was a childhood fan of the Pittsburgh Penguins, crediting Sidney Crosby and the 2009 Stanley Cup Finals as inspiration for his ice hockey career.

== Career statistics ==
=== Regular season and playoffs ===
			Regular season					Playoffs
Season	Team	League	GP	G	A	Pts	PIM	GP	G	A	Pts	PIM
2018–19	Lincoln Stars	USHL	30	17	15	32	51	—	—	—	—	—
2018–19	Tri-City Storm	USHL	26	11	16	27	12	—	—	—	—	—
2019–20	University of North Dakota	NCHC	33	16	12	28	46	—	—	—	—	—
2020–21	University of North Dakota	NCHC	28	15	17	32	4	—	—	—	—	—
2020–21	Ottawa Senators	NHL	12	1	6	7	10	—	—	—	—	—
2021–22	Ottawa Senators	NHL	5	0	1	1	2	—	—	—	—	—
2022–23	Ottawa Senators	NHL	82	20	15	35	18	—	—	—	—	—
2023–24	Ottawa Senators	NHL	41	9	18	27	14	—	—	—	—	—
2024–25	Ottawa Senators	NHL	70	21	16	37	26	6	1	1	2	2
2025–26	Ottawa Senators	NHL	72	23	23	46	42	4	0	0	0	2
NHL totals			282	74	79	153	112	10	1	1	2	4

=== International ===
Year	Team	Event	Result	GP	G	A	Pts	PIM
2018	United States	WJAC	1st place, gold medalist(s)	6	1	1	2	4
2020	United States	WJC	6th	5	4	3	7	2
2024	United States	WC	5th	8	2	7	9	6
2025	United States	WC	1st place, gold medalist(s)	8	2	8	10	2
Junior totals				11	5	4	9	6
Senior totals				16	4	15	19	8

== Awards and honors ==
Award	Year	Ref
College
All-NCHC First Team	2020–21	
AHCA West First Team All-American	2020–21	

Awards and achievements
Preceded by Taylor Ward	NCHC Rookie of the Year; 2019–20	Succeeded by Veeti Miettinen
Preceded by Justin Richards	NCHC Defensive Forward of the Year; 2020–21	Succeeded by Connor Ford
Preceded by Jordan Kawaguchi	NCHC Forward of the Year; 2020–21	Succeeded by Bobby Brink
Preceded by Scott Perunovich	NCHC Player of the Year; 2020–21	Succeeded by Bobby Brink
