= Josh Archibald =

American ice hockey player (born 1992)

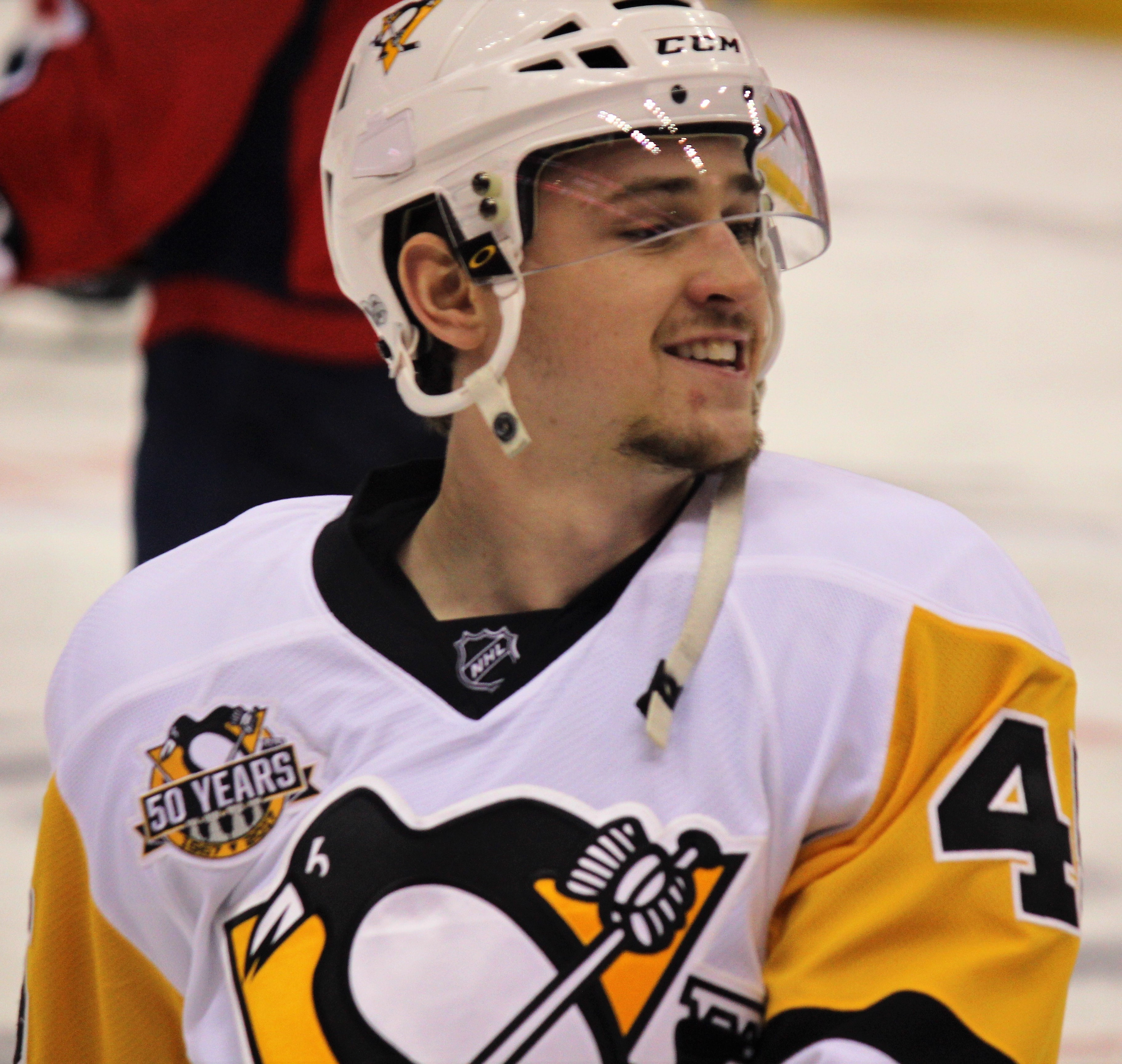
- Archibald with the Pittsburgh Penguins during the 2017 Stanley Cup playoffs
- Born: October 6, 1992 (age 33) Regina, Saskatchewan, Canada
- Height: 5 ft 10 in (178 cm)
- Weight: 176 lb (80 kg; 12 st 8 lb)
- Position: Right wing
- Shot: Right
- Played for: Pittsburgh Penguins; Arizona Coyotes; Edmonton Oilers
- NHL draft: 174th overall, 2011; Pittsburgh Penguins
- Playing career: 2014–2023

Joshua Archibald (born October 6, 1992) is a Canadian-born American former professional ice hockey right winger. Archibald was selected by the Penguins in the sixth round (174th overall) of the 2011 NHL entry draft.

== Early life ==
Archibald was born in Regina, Saskatchewan. His father Jim Archibald was a notorious Enforcer for the North Dakota Fighting Sioux men's ice hockey team in college, setting the National Collegiate Athletic Association (NCAA) record for penalty minutes before joining the Minnesota North Stars of the National Hockey League. His mother Anne also attended the University of North Dakota, where she was part of the school's swim team. Archibald grew up in Lumsden, Saskatchewan, a small town in the Qu'Appelle Valley, and he played minor ice hockey for the Balgonie Prairie Storm and, briefly, the Moose Jaw AAA Warriors of the Saskatchewan Male U18 AAA Hockey League.

When he was 15 years old, Archibald and his family moved to Brainerd, Minnesota, where he continued to play ice hockey for Brainerd High School. As a senior in 2011, Archibald set a Brainerd single-season scoring record with 78 points, and his 152 career points for the Brainerd Warriors was the second-highest in program history. Also in 2011, Archibald was a finalist for Minnesota's Mr. Hockey award, given to the top graduating high school ice hockey player in the state. The award that year went to Kyle Rau, then with Eden Prairie High School.

== Playing career ==
=== NCAA ===
He then played college hockey at the University of Nebraska Omaha from 2011 to 2014. He was selected as the WCHA Rookie of the Week in November 2011. At Nebraska Omaha, Archibald played on a line with future Pittsburgh Penguins teammate Jake Guentzel. In 2013–14, Archibald was a finalist for the Hobey Baker Award, marking him as one of the ten best players in men's college hockey; he was also named All-NCHC First Team, and won the NCHC's Player of the Year and Forward of the Year awards.

=== Professional ===
==== Pittsburgh Penguins ====
On May 16, 2014, Archibald signed a three-year entry-level contract with the Pittsburgh Penguins. Archibald made his NHL debut on March 5, 2016, in a home game against the Calgary Flames but was soon reassigned to the Penguins AHL affiliate Wilkes-Barre/Scranton Penguins.

He was recalled back to the Penguins on February 11, 2017, which is also when he scored his first 2 NHL goals in a game against the Arizona Coyotes. However, he was returned to the Penguins AHL affiliate Wilkes-Barre/Scranton Penguins two games later. He was recalled to the Pittsburgh in late March and competed in the 2017 Stanley Cup Final, lifting the Stanley Cup after teammate Jake Guentzel.

On July 12, 2017, Archibald re-signed with the Penguins on a two-year, one-way contract with an average annual value of $675,000.

In the 2017–18 season, Archibald made the Penguins' opening night roster. On December 1, 2017, he was reassigned to the Wilkes-Barre/Scranton Penguins for a conditioning stint.

==== Arizona Coyotes ====
On December 19, 2017, the Penguins traded Archibald, along with Sean Maguire and a 6th-round pick in the 2019 NHL entry draft, to the Arizona Coyotes in exchange for Michael Leighton and a fourth-round pick in 2019. This trade's purpose was to clear space for a follow-up trade which brought defenceman Jamie Oleksiak to Pittsburgh from Dallas.

The Coyotes chose not to tender Archibald a qualifying offer after the 2018–19 season, and he was released into free agency.

==== Edmonton Oilers ====
On July 16, 2019, the Edmonton Oilers signed Archibald to a one-year contract. Shortly into the 2019–20 season, while playing on the checking line with Riley Sheahan and Jujhar Khaira, he fractured his right foot under unspecified circumstances. Even after his return, he did not score a goal until December 1, when he was promoted to the top line alongside Connor McDavid. Archibald received a shot from Darnell Nurse to help put the Oilers up 5–2 over the Vancouver Canucks. Although he was not a permanent fixture on the top line, Archibald was often the first to be promoted during the 2019–20 season when one of McDavid's usual partners was unavailable. On March 7, 2020, the Oilers signed Archibald to a two-year contract extension that would take him through the 2021–22 season. The following week, the NHL chose to suspend the regular season indefinitely due to the COVID-19 pandemic; at the time of the pause, Archibald had 12 goals and 21 points in 62 games. When the NHL resumed play for the 2020 Stanley Cup playoffs in July, Archibald was one of 31 Oilers invited into the Edmonton "bubble". There, the Oilers lost the qualifying round 3-1 against the Chicago Blackhawks.

On October 3, 2021, Oilers medical staff announced that Archibald would be out indefinitely because of myocarditis, which developed after he contracted COVID-19 during the summer of 2021. By March 12, 2022, he had made a full recovery and returned to the Oilers line up. However, he would be limited by the travel restrictions Canada currently has in place for unvaccinated people crossing the border. He was able to participate in eight of the final twenty-four games of the regular season, largely in a fourth-line role. The Oilers qualified for the 2022 Stanley Cup playoffs, and Archibald participated in the team's deep run to the Western Conference Final, where they lost to the Colorado Avalanche in four games.

==== Return to Pittsburgh ====
As a free agent from the Oilers, Archibald returned to his original club, the Pittsburgh Penguins, after signing a one-year, $900,000 contract on July 13, 2022.

==== Tampa Bay Lightning ====
On July 1, 2023, Archibald signed as a free agent to a two-year, $1.6 million contract with the Tampa Bay Lightning. On September 9, 2023, it was announced by Lightning General Manager, Julien BriseBois, that Josh Archibald was “placed on unconditional waivers… for the purpose of terminating his contract” following talks with Archibald and his agent where it was made clear that Josh would not be playing hockey for unspecified reasons.

== International career ==
Archibald holds dual citizenship for both Canada and the United States, choosing to play for the Americans in international competition.

Archibald played with Team USA at the 2012 World Junior Ice Hockey Championships.

== Personal life ==
Archibald was born in Regina, Saskatchewan, but grew up in Brainerd, Minnesota and is a dual citizen of both Canada and the United States. His father, Jim Archibald, played in the NHL with the Minnesota North Stars during the mid-1980s.

In June 2016, he married Bailey Baxter. They had met at the University of Nebraska Omaha. Their first child, Brecken Carter Archibald, was born in August 2017. On August 30, 2017, Brecken, at 3 weeks old, was baptized in the Stanley Cup.

After COVID-19 infection in summer 2021, Archibald developed myocarditis. He was out for most of the 2021–22 season but rejoined the Oilers in March 2022.

== Career statistics ==
=== Regular season and playoffs ===
			Regular season					Playoffs
Season	Team	League	GP	G	A	Pts	PIM	GP	G	A	Pts	PIM
2009–10	Brainerd High	USHS	27	22	35	57	74	—	—	—	—	—
2010–11	Brainerd High	USHS	27	30	48	78	40	—	—	—	—	—
2011–12	Omaha Mavericks	WCHA	36	10	5	15	33	—	—	—	—	—
2012–13	Omaha Mavericks	WCHA	39	19	17	36	34	—	—	—	—	—
2013–14	Omaha Mavericks	NCHC	37	29	14	43	62	—	—	—	—	—
2013–14	Wilkes-Barre/Scranton Penguins	AHL	7	1	0	1	13	2	1	0	1	0
2014–15	Wilkes-Barre/Scranton Penguins	AHL	45	5	8	13	24	3	0	1	1	0
2014–15	Wheeling Nailers	ECHL	9	7	4	11	4	—	—	—	—	—
2015–16	Wilkes-Barre/Scranton Penguins	AHL	69	9	9	18	75	10	1	0	1	10
2015–16	Pittsburgh Penguins	NHL	1	0	0	0	0	—	—	—	—	—
2016–17	Wilkes-Barre/Scranton Penguins	AHL	61	16	13	29	54	5	2	0	2	16
2016–17	Pittsburgh Penguins	NHL	10	3	0	3	4	4	0	0	0	2
2017–18	Pittsburgh Penguins	NHL	3	0	0	0	0	—	—	—	—	—
2017–18	Wilkes-Barre/Scranton Penguins	AHL	6	1	2	3	4	—	—	—	—	—
2017–18	Arizona Coyotes	NHL	39	5	6	11	25	—	—	—	—	—
2018–19	Arizona Coyotes	NHL	68	12	10	22	15	—	—	—	—	—
2019–20	Edmonton Oilers	NHL	62	12	9	21	12	4	1	0	1	4
2020–21	Edmonton Oilers	NHL	52	7	6	13	37	3	0	0	0	2
2021–22	Edmonton Oilers	NHL	8	0	1	1	7	13	0	1	1	4
2022–23	Pittsburgh Penguins	NHL	62	6	6	12	43	—	—	—	—	—
NHL totals			305	45	38	83	143	24	1	1	2	12

=== International ===
Year	Team	Event	Result	GP	G	A	Pts	PIM
2012	United States	WJC	7th	6	0	2	2	6
Junior totals				6	0	2	2	6

== Awards and honors ==
Award	Year
College
All-NCHC First Team	2014
AHCA West First-Team All-American	2014
NHL
Stanley Cup champion	2017

Awards and achievements
Preceded by Award Created	NCHC Player of the Year; 2013–14	Succeeded by Joey LaLeggia
Preceded by Award Created	NCHC Forward of the Year; 2013–14	Succeeded by Trevor Moore
