= Zeev Buium =

Israeli-American ice hockey player (born 2005)

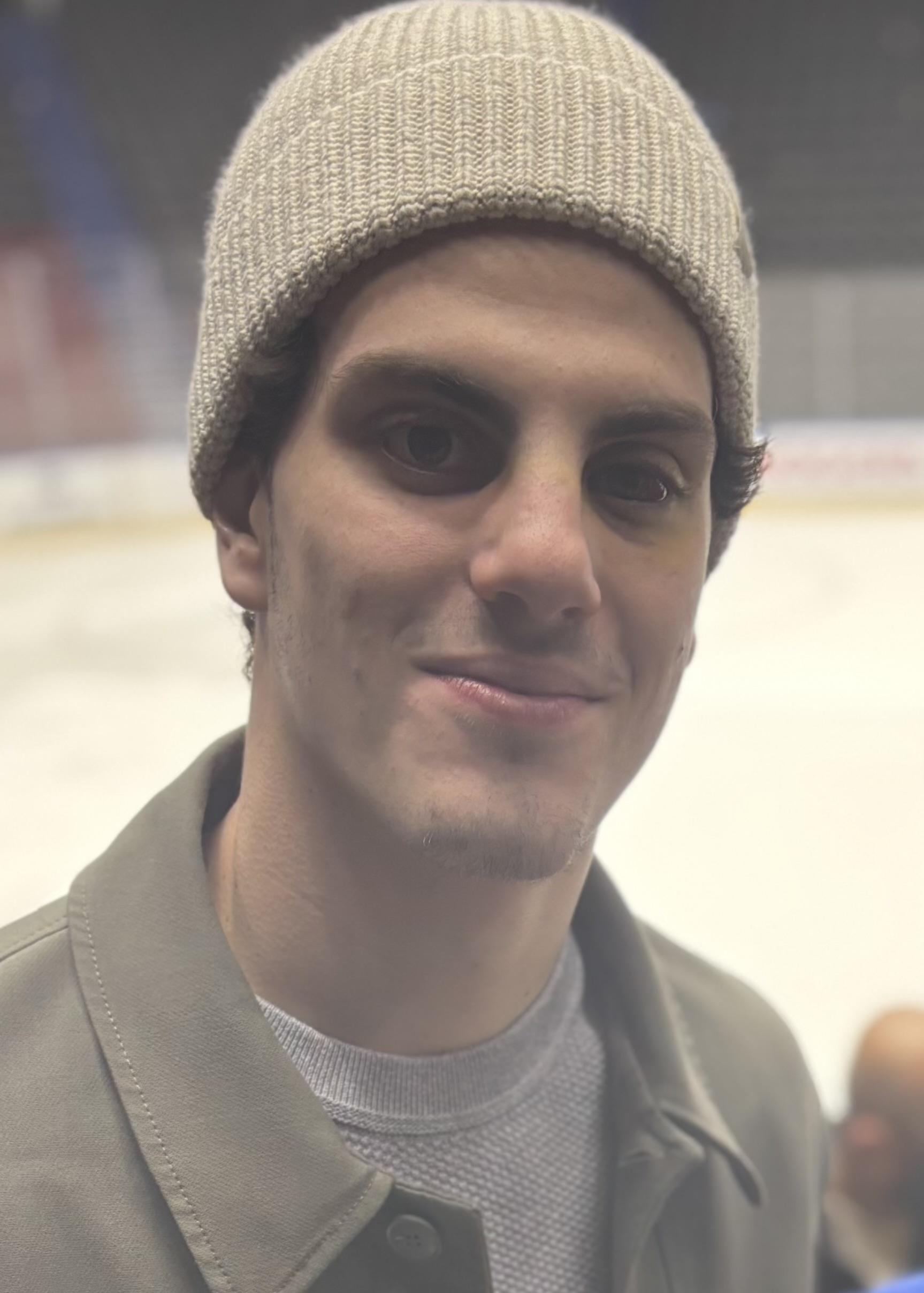
- Buium in January 2026
- Born: December 7, 2005 (age 20) San Diego, California, U.S.
- Height: 6 ft 0 in (183 cm)
- Weight: 183 lb (83 kg; 13 st 1 lb)
- Position: Defense
- Shoots: Left
- NHL team Former teams: Vancouver Canucks; Minnesota Wild
- National team: United States
- NHL draft: 12th overall, 2024; Minnesota Wild
- Playing career: 2025–present

Zeev Buium (/ˈziːv ˈbuːjʌm/ ZEEV BOO-yuhm; born December 7, 2005) is an Israeli-American professional ice hockey player who is a defenseman and alternate captain for the Vancouver Canucks of the National Hockey League (NHL). He was drafted 12th overall by the Minnesota Wild in the 2024 NHL entry draft. Buium played two season of college ice hockey with the University of Denver, made his NHL debut with Minnesota in the 2025–26 season, and was traded to Vancouver in December of that year.

== Playing career ==
=== Junior ===
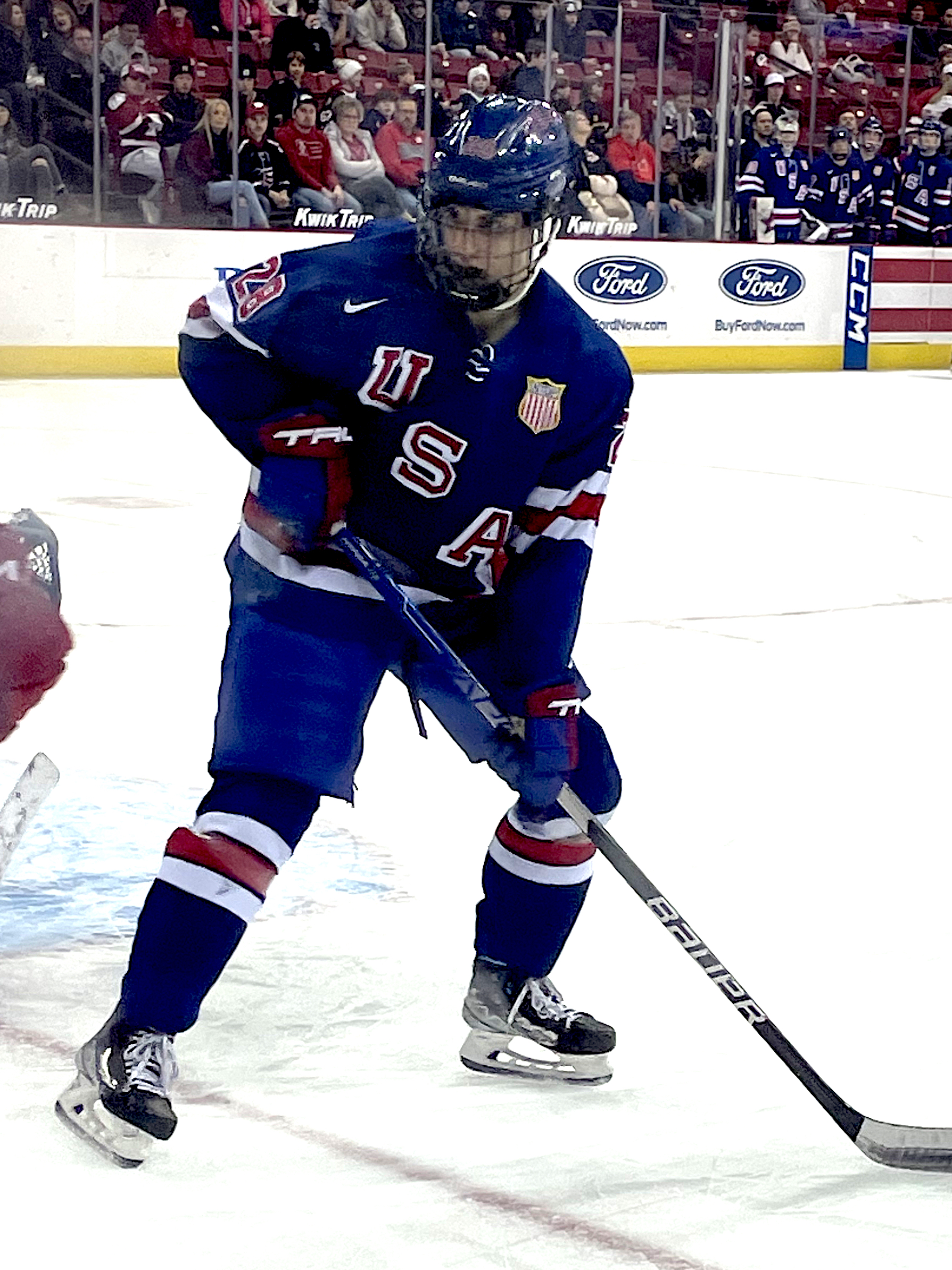
Buium playing for the USNTDP in 2023.

Buium played two seasons for the USA Hockey National Team Development Program (NTDP) of the United States Hockey League (USHL). During the 2021–22 season, he recorded four goals and nine assists in 49 games for the under-17 team, and two goals and three assists in 32 USHL games. During the 2022–23 season, he led all team defensemen with 40 points in 63 total games for the under-18 team, and two goals and ten assists in 23 USHL games.

=== College ===
Buium began his collegiate career for the Denver Pioneers during the 2023–24 season. He was the second-youngest player in NCAA Division I hockey during his freshman year. He was named the National Collegiate Hockey Conference (NCHC) Player of the Month and the HCA National Co-Player of the Month for November 2023. He became the first freshman defenseman to ever win NCHC Player of the Month. He led all NCHC players in points (14), points-per-game (1.75), assists (11) and plus/minus (+13) during the month. With three assists in a game against Western Michigan on December 9, 2023, he extended his scoring streak to 12 games, surpassing Lane Hutson's record for the longest point streak by a freshman defenseman in the last 21 years. He was named the NCHC Rookie of the Month for December 2023. During the month he recorded one goal and six assists in four games. His 1.75 points per game was tied for the most in the NCHC during the month, and his seven points led all league freshmen and defensemen in scoring in that time. Buium led all NCHC freshmen and NCHC defensemen and ranked second behind Jackson Blake with 31 points in 24 conference games, the second-most points ever in NCHC play by a defenseman, trailing only Scott Perunovich's 32 points during the 2019–20 season. His 25 assists in conference play were also second among all skaters and first among defensemen. Buium recorded one assist in the NCAA national championship game, a 2–0 win over Boston College. He ended the season ranked first on the team in assists and second in points with 39 assists and 50 points in 42 games, and ranked first among all NCHC defensemen in goals, assists, and points. Following the season he was named to the All-NCHC First Team and All-NCHC Rookie Team. He was also named NCHC Rookie of the Year and NCHC Offensive Defenseman of the Year.

During the 2024–25 season, in his sophomore year, he led all defensemen in scoring with 13 goals and 35 assists in 41 games. On November 15, 2024, in a game against North Dakota, he scored his first career hat-trick. This was the 12th hat-trick by a Denver defenseman in program history and the first since Ryan Caldwell on February 14, 2004, against Minnesota State. During conference play he led all defensemen in scoring with eight goals and 20 assists. Following the season he was named to the All-NCHC First Team and NCHC Offensive Defenseman of the Year for the second consecutive year. He was also named the NCHC Player of the Year and a Hobey Hat Trick finalist for the Hobey Baker Award.

=== Professional ===
On April 13, 2025, Buium signed a three-year, entry-level contract with the Minnesota Wild. He made his NHL debut for the Wild on April 19, during the first round of the 2025 Stanley Cup playoffs against the Vegas Golden Knights. He became the first Wild player ever to debut during the postseason. During the 2025–26 season, in his first NHL season, Buium recorded three goals and 11 assists in 31 games for the Wild. Buium's tenure in Minnesota was brief, however, as he was traded to the Vancouver Canucks on December 12. He was part of a package including Marco Rossi, Liam Öhgren, and a 2026 first-round pick, in exchange for defenseman Quinn Hughes.

On September 4, 2026, the Canucks signed Buium to an eight-year, $75.04 million contract extension.

== International play ==
Medal record

Men's ice hockey

Representing the United States

World Championships
| Gold medal – first place | 2025 Sweden/Denmark | |

World Junior Championships
| Gold medal – first place | 2024 Sweden | |
| Gold medal – first place | 2025 Canada | |

World U18 Championships
| Gold medal – first place | 2023 Switzerland | |

Buium represented the United States at the 2023 World U18 Championships where he recorded one goal and five assists in seven games and won a gold medal.

On December 16, 2023, Buium was named to the United States junior team to compete at the 2024 World Junior Championships. He recorded three goals and two assists in seven games and won a gold medal. He again represented the United States at the 2025 World Junior Championships where he recorded two goals and four assists in seven games and won a gold medal. He helped the United States win back-to-back gold medals at the World Junior Championships for the first time in history.

Buium made his senior national team debut for the United States at the 2025 World Championship, where he recorded one goal and three assists in eight games and helped the United States win their first gold medal since 1933.

== Personal life ==
Buium was born in San Diego, California, to Israeli immigrants, Sorin and Miriam Buium, who came to the U.S. from Ashdod, Israel in 1999, and he is a dual citizen of the U.S. and Israel. He is Jewish, and fasts on Yom Kippur. His mother, Miriam, played professional basketball in Israel before an injury ended her playing career and she transitioned to being a general manager in the sport.

Buium's older brother, Shai, also played college ice hockey at Denver and was drafted 36th overall by the Detroit Red Wings in the 2021 NHL entry draft. Buium has a tattoo on his left forearm in Hebrew commemorating the dates he won two gold medals and an NCAA title.

== Career statistics ==
=== Regular season and playoffs ===
| | | | Regular season | | | | | Playoffs |
| Season | Team | League | GP | G | A | Pts | PIM | GP | G | A | Pts | PIM |
|---|---|---|---|---|---|---|---|---|---|---|---|---|
| 2021–22 | U.S. National Development Team | USHL | 32 | 2 | 3 | 5 | 10 | — | — | — | — | — |
| 2022–23 | U.S. National Development Team | USHL | 23 | 2 | 10 | 12 | 20 | — | — | — | — | — |
| 2023–24 | University of Denver | NCHC | 42 | 11 | 39 | 50 | 20 | — | — | — | — | — |
| 2024–25 | University of Denver | NCHC | 41 | 13 | 35 | 48 | 44 | — | — | — | — | — |
| 2024–25 | Minnesota Wild | NHL | — | — | — | — | — | 4 | 0 | 1 | 1 | 4 |
| 2025–26 | Minnesota Wild | NHL | 31 | 3 | 11 | 14 | 8 | — | — | — | — | — |
| 2025–26 | Vancouver Canucks | NHL | 45 | 3 | 9 | 12 | 33 | — | — | — | — | — |
| NHL totals | | | 76 | 6 | 20 | 26 | 41 | 4 | 0 | 1 | 1 | 4 |

=== International ===
| Year | Team | Event | Result | GP | G | A | Pts | PIM |
|---|---|---|---|---|---|---|---|---|
| 2023 | United States | U18 | 1st place, gold medalist(s) | 7 | 1 | 5 | 6 | 0 |
| 2024 | United States | WJC | 1st place, gold medalist(s) | 7 | 3 | 2 | 5 | 4 |
| 2025 | United States | WJC | 1st place, gold medalist(s) | 7 | 2 | 4 | 6 | 2 |
| 2025 | United States | WC | 1st place, gold medalist(s) | 8 | 1 | 3 | 4 | 0 |
| Junior totals | | | | 21 | 6 | 11 | 17 | 6 |
| Senior totals | | | | 8 | 1 | 3 | 4 | 0 |

== Awards and honors ==
| Award | Year | Ref |
College
| All-NCHC Rookie Team | 2024 | |
| All-NCHC First Team | 2024, 2025 | |
| NCHC Rookie of the Year | 2024 | |
| NCHC Offensive Defenseman of the Year | 2024, 2025 | |
| AHCA West First Team All-American | 2024, 2025 | |
| NCAA All-Tournament Team | 2024, 2025 | |
| NCHC Player of the Year | 2025 | |

== See also ==
- List of select Jewish ice hockey players

Awards and achievements
| Preceded by Jackson Blake | NCHC Rookie of the Year; 2023–24 | Succeeded by Sacha Boisvert |
| Preceded by Michael Benning | NCHC Offensive Defenseman of the Year; 2023–24, 2024–25 | Succeeded by Eric Pohlkamp |
| Preceded by Jackson Blake | NCHC Player of the Year; 2024–25 | Succeeded by Max Plante |
| Preceded by Charlie Stramel | Minnesota Wild first-round draft pick 2024 | Succeeded by Incumbent |
