= NCHC Rookie of the Year =

- Sport: College ice hockey
- League: NCHC

History
- First award: 2014
- Most recent: Cole Reschny

The NCHC Rookie of the Year is an annual award given out at the conclusion of the National Collegiate Hockey Conference regular season to the best rookie in the conference as voted by the coaches of each NCHC team.

The Rookie of the Year was first awarded in 2014 and is a successor to the CCHA Rookie of the Year which was temporarily discontinued after the first iteration of the conference dissolved due to the 2013–14 NCAA conference realignment.

== Award winners ==
Year	Winner	Position	School
2013–14	Jaccob Slavin	Defenceman	Colorado College
2014–15	Danton Heinen	Right wing	Denver
2015–16	Brock Boeser	Right wing	North Dakota
2016–17	Henrik Borgström	Center	Denver
2017–18	Scott Perunovich	Defenceman	Minnesota–Duluth
2018–19	Taylor Ward	Right wing	Omaha
2019–20	Shane Pinto	Center	North Dakota
2020–21	Veeti Miettinen	Right wing	St. Cloud State
2021–22	Carter Mazur	Left wing	Denver
2022–23	Jackson Blake	Right wing	North Dakota
2023–24	Zeev Buium	Defenceman	Denver
2024–25	Sacha Boisvert	Center	North Dakota
2025–26	Cole Reschny	Center	North Dakota

=== Winners by school ===
School	Winners
North Dakota	5
Denver	4
Colorado College	1
Minnesota–Duluth	1
Omaha	1
St. Cloud State	1

=== Winners by position ===
Position	Winners
Right wing	5
Center	4
Left wing	1
Defenceman	3
Goaltender	0

== See also ==
- NCHC Awards
- CCHA Rookie of the Year
