= Will Butcher =

American ice hockey player (born 1995)

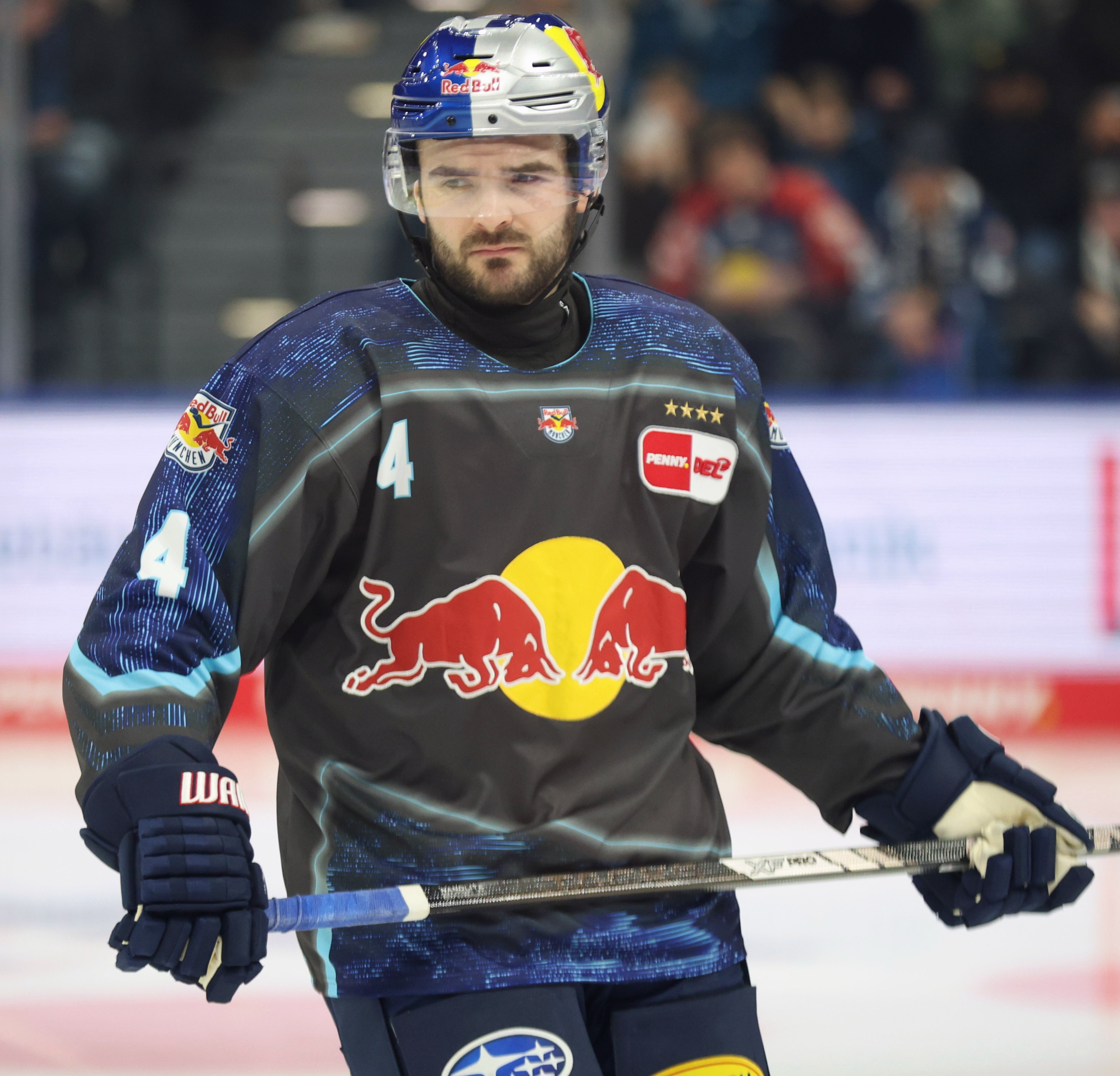
- Butcher with Munich in 2024
- Born: January 6, 1995 (age 31) Sun Prairie, Wisconsin, U.S.
- Height: 5 ft 10 in (178 cm)
- Weight: 190 lb (86 kg; 13 st 8 lb)
- Position: Defense
- Shoots: Left
- team Former teams: Free agent New Jersey Devils; Buffalo Sabres; Barys Astana; EHC München
- National team: United States
- NHL draft: 123rd overall, 2013; Colorado Avalanche
- Playing career: 2017–present

William Butcher (born January 6, 1995) is an American professional ice hockey defenseman who is currently an unrestricted free agent. He most recently played for the Cleveland Monsters in the American Hockey League (AHL). Butcher was selected in the fifth round, 123rd overall, by the Colorado Avalanche in the 2013 NHL entry draft.

== Early life ==
Butcher was born on January 6, 1995, in Sun Prairie, Wisconsin to parents Joe and Julie.

== Playing career ==
Butcher played college hockey at the University of Denver from 2013 to 2017. For his play in the 2016–17 season, Butcher won the Hobey Baker Award as the best player in men's college hockey. He was also named a NCHC First-Team All-Star, NCHC Player of the Year, and NCHC Offensive Defenseman of the Year for 2016–17. He helped Denver win the 2017 NCAA Championship.

On August 27, 2017, as an NHL free agent, Butcher signed a two-year, entry-level maximum contract with the New Jersey Devils worth an annual base salary of $925,000.

After participating in his first training camp with the Devils, Butcher made the Devils' opening night roster for the 2017–18 season. In the Devils' home opener, Butcher made his NHL debut against the Colorado Avalanche on October 7, 2017, a game in which he became the first Devils' player in franchise history to record three points in his debut, registering three assists on the power play in a 4–1 victory.

On July 31, 2019, Butcher signed a three-year contract extension with the Devils. On February 18, 2020, Butcher suffered a season-ending injury during the game between the Devils and St. Louis Blues. He appeared in 56 games, recording four goals and 17 assists during the 2019–20 season.

After completing his fourth season with the Devils, and with his role diminishing in each season, Butcher was traded by New Jersey along with a fifth-round draft pick in 2022 to the Buffalo Sabres on July 28, 2021 for future considerations, in a move to clear cap space for the Devils. In the 2021–22 season, Butcher saw his offensive impact decrease for the fifth consecutive season, collecting two goals and eight points in just 37 games with the Sabres.

At the conclusion of his contract with Buffalo, Butcher was signed as a free agent to a one-year, two-way contract with the Dallas Stars on July 22, 2022. In the following 2022–23 season, Butcher was assigned to the AHL for the first time in his career, joining affiliate the Texas Stars. He remained in Texas for the duration of his contract, leading the blueline in scoring with 43 points while setting a franchise record with 37 assists for a defenseman in a single season.

As a free agent from the Stars, Butcher was signed to a one-year, two-way contract with the Pittsburgh Penguins on July 3, 2023. However, halfway through the season, Butcher was traded to the Minnesota Wild in exchange for forward Maxim Čajkovič.

At the conclusion of his contract with the Wild, Butcher left as a free agent and signed his first contract abroad, agreeing to a one-year deal with Kazakhstan-based club Barys Astana of the Kontinental Hockey League (KHL) on July 25, 2024. In the 2024–25 season, on October 18, Butcher was released by the team following just 15 appearances along with fellow North American ex-NHLers Michael McLeod and Nathan Beaulieu.

On November 22, 2024, Butcher signed to play the remainder of the 2024–25 season with Red Bull Munich of the Deutsche Eishockey Liga (DEL).

At the conclusion of his contract, Butcher returned to North America after a season abroad, signing a one-year AHL contract for the 2025–26 season with the Cleveland Monsters, affiliate to the Columbus Blue Jackets on October 9, 2025.

== International play ==
Medal record

Representing United States

Men's ice hockey

World Championships
Bronze medal – third place	2018 Denmark	

World U18 Championships
Gold medal – first place	2012 Czech Republic	
Silver medal – second place	2013 Russia	

Butcher was named to the senior United States roster to compete at the 2018 IIHF World Championship.

== Career statistics ==
=== Regular season and playoffs ===
			Regular season					Playoffs
Season	Team	League	GP	G	A	Pts	PIM	GP	G	A	Pts	PIM
2010–11	Madison Capitols 18U AAA	T1EHL	34	10	20	30	2	—	—	—	—	—
2010–11	Dubuque Fighting Saints	USHL	2	0	2	2	0	—	—	—	—	—
2011–12	U.S. NTDP Juniors	USHL	31	2	8	10	4	—	—	—	—	—
2011–12	U.S. NTDP U17	USDP	46	8	23	31	8	—	—	—	—	—
2011–12	U.S. NTDP U18	USDP	10	0	2	2	2	—	—	—	—	—
2012–13	U.S. NTDP Juniors	USHL	26	3	10	13	2	—	—	—	—	—
2012–13	U.S. NTDP U18	USDP	67	11	26	37	8	—	—	—	—	—
2013–14	University of Denver	NCHC	38	8	8	16	8	—	—	—	—	—
2014–15	University of Denver	NCHC	38	4	14	18	8	—	—	—	—	—
2015–16	University of Denver	NCHC	39	9	23	32	19	—	—	—	—	—
2016–17	University of Denver	NCHC	43	7	30	37	18	—	—	—	—	—
2017–18	New Jersey Devils	NHL	81	5	39	44	8	5	1	3	4	0
2018–19	New Jersey Devils	NHL	78	4	26	30	18	—	—	—	—	—
2019–20	New Jersey Devils	NHL	56	4	17	21	6	—	—	—	—	—
2020–21	New Jersey Devils	NHL	23	1	10	11	2	—	—	—	—	—
2021–22	Buffalo Sabres	NHL	37	2	6	8	0	—	—	—	—	—
2022–23	Texas Stars	AHL	65	6	37	43	16	4	0	0	0	2
2023–24	Wilkes-Barre/Scranton Penguins	AHL	14	3	4	7	6	—	—	—	—	—
2023–24	Iowa Wild	AHL	24	3	6	9	2	—	—	—	—	—
2024–25	Barys Astana	KHL	15	0	3	3	4	—	—	—	—	—
2024–25	EHC München	DEL	32	3	8	11	2	5	0	3	3	2
2025–26	Cleveland Monsters	AHL	62	3	18	21	12	9	1	4	5	2
NHL totals			275	16	98	114	34	5	1	3	4	0
KHL totals			15	0	3	3	4	—	—	—	—	—

=== International ===
Year	Team	Event	Result	GP	G	A	Pts	PIM
2012	United States	U17	2nd place, silver medalist(s)	5	0	6	6	2
2012	United States	U18	1st place, gold medalist(s)	6	0	0	0	2
2013	United States	U18	2nd place, silver medalist(s)	7	2	2	4	2
2014	United States	WJC	5th	5	2	3	5	2
2015	United States	WJC	5th	5	0	1	1	0
2018	United States	WC	3rd place, bronze medalist(s)	10	1	2	3	0
Junior totals				28	4	12	16	8
Senior totals				10	1	2	3	0

== Awards and honors ==
Award	Year	Ref
College
NCHC First All-Star Team	2016, 2017	
AHCA West Second-Team All-American	2016	
NCHC Offensive Defenseman of the Year	2017	
NCHC Player of the Year	2017	
AHCA West First-Team All-American	2017	
NCAA All-Tournament Team	2017	
NCAA West First All-Star Team	2017	
Hobey Baker Award	2017	
NHL
All-Rookie Team	2018	

Awards and achievements
Preceded by Jimmy Vesey	Hobey Baker Award; 2016–17	Succeeded by Adam Gaudette
Preceded by Ethan Prow	NCHC Player of the Year; 2016–17	Succeeded by Henrik Borgström
Preceded by Ethan Prow	NCHC Offensive Defenseman of the Year; 2016–17	Succeeded by Scott Perunovich
