= Collegiate Ice Hockey Association =

- Sport: Ice hockey
- Founded: 2013
- Ceased: 2014
- Region: California, Washington, Idaho, Oregon, New York, Pennsylvania, Ohio

The Collegiate Ice Hockey Association or CIHA was a national organization of non-NCAA, men's college and university level ice hockey programs. The CIHA took over where the National Association of Intercollegiate Hockey left off. The CIHA is now referred to as the National Collegiate Hockey Association. All of the records starting from the NAIH will carry over to the NCHA.

== History ==
The NAIH was formed as an alternative to the American Collegiate Hockey Association in 2011 with the philosophy that there should be an option for college hockey teams that want a lower cost for membership combined with the highest level of competition possible. In the spring of 2013, the NAIH merged with the USCHA which created the CIHA.

== See also ==
- National Collegiate Hockey Association
- National Association of Intercollegiate Hockey
- American Collegiate Hockey Association
