= National Association of Intercollegiate Hockey =

- NAIH Primary Logo
- Abbreviation: NAIH
- Formation: 2011
- Dissolved: 2013
- Type: Athletic
- Legal status: Association
- Region served: United States of America, Canada

The National Association of Intercollegiate Hockey (NAIH) was a national organization of non-NCAA, men's college and university level ice hockey programs. Membership in the NAIH consisted of private and public colleges and universities throughout the world.

== History ==
In 2011 a group of individuals were inspired to start a collegiate ice hockey association after reviewing documentations on the cost of joining existing associations. The group sought out an experienced individual to discuss the formation of an association. Several individuals began contacting schools to form the National Association of Intercollegiate Hockey. The goal of the association was to capitalize on the growing demand for a competing association. The driving factor behind the formation of the NAIH was the rising cost of being a member of another association. After the 2012-13 season the NAIH folded. However the Collegiate Ice Hockey Association was formed in its place. After the 2013-14 season the organization once again changed its name to the National Collegiate Hockey Association.

== See also ==
- List of NAIH Institutions
- National Collegiate Hockey Association
- Collegiate Ice Hockey Association
- American Collegiate Hockey Association
