= Ethan Prow =

American ice hockey player

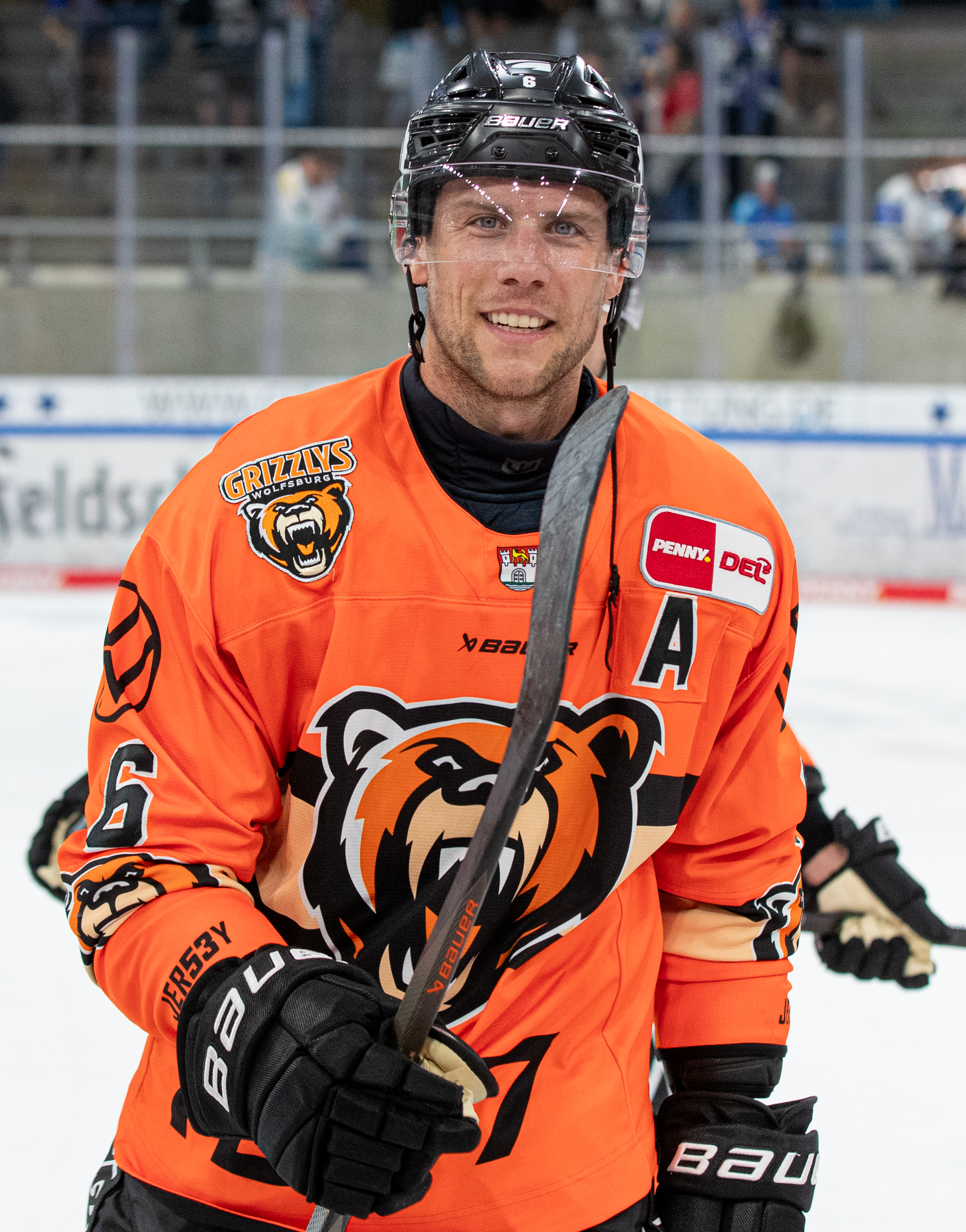
- Prow in 2025
- Born: November 17, 1992 (age 33) Sauk Rapids, Minnesota, U.S.
- Height: 5 ft 11 in (180 cm)
- Weight: 185 lb (84 kg; 13 st 3 lb)
- Position: Defenseman
- Shoots: Right
- SML team Former teams: HC Ässät Pori; EHC München; Buffalo Sabres; Grizzlys Wolfsburg
- NHL draft: Undrafted
- Playing career: 2016–present

Ethan Prow (born November 17, 1992) is an American professional ice hockey defenseman currently playing with HC Ässät of the Liiga.

Prior to turning professional, Prow played four seasons at St. Cloud State. In his senior year, Prow was named a Hobey Baker Award top ten finalist and selected for the All-NCHC First Team, NCHC Player of the Year, NCHC Defenseman of the Year, NCHC Offensive Defenseman of the Year and Division I AHCA All-American West First Team.

== Playing career ==
=== Collegiate ===
Prow played college hockey at St. Cloud State from 2012 to 2016. In his second game with the St. Cloud Huskies, Prow recorded two goals and an assist in an 8–3 win over the University of Alabama in Huntsville Chargers on October 19, 2012.

In his sophomore season, Prow recorded a new career high of four goals and 19 assists, which he again tied in his junior year, and was named to the All-NCHC Academic Team.

In 2015–16, Prow was named the captain of the Huskies and he guided them to their first NCHC Frozen Faceoff championship while tying the school record in wins. As a result, he was named a finalist for the Hobey Baker Award, marking him as one of the ten best players in men's college hockey; he was also named All-NCHC First Team and won the NCHC's Player of the Year, Defenseman of the Year, and Offensive Defenseman of the Year awards. He was also named a First All-American Team.

Prow signed a two-year entry-level contract with the Pittsburgh Penguins on March 29, 2016. He joined the Penguins American Hockey League affiliate, the Wilkes-Barre/Scranton Penguins, as an amateur tryout to complete their season. He made his AHL debut on April 8, 2016, against the Lehigh Valley Phantoms.

=== Professional ===
On October 20, 2016, Prow was reassigned to the Penguins ECHL affiliate, the Wheeling Nailers, and he made his ECHL debut that night. He recorded two assists in the 4–3 loss to the Reading Royals. On October 22, Prow was promoted back to the AHL. He recorded his first AHL points that season, two assists, in a 6–1 win over the Syracuse Crunch after his promotion. On February 3, Prow recorded his first, and only, goal in a 5–2 loss to the St. John's IceCaps. Prow finished the season with the WBS Penguins and ended his rookie campaign with 16 points in 59 games.

After attending the Pittsburgh Penguins 2017–18 training camp, Prow was reassigned to the WBS Penguins for the 2017–18 season. However, he was reassigned to the Nailers again on December 6, 2017. Prow played three games for the Nailers before returning to the WBS Penguins for the rest of the season. Prow completed his sophomore season with 17 points in 40 games.

Prow re-signed a one-year contract with the Penguins on July 17, 2018. After participating in the Penguins 2018 Training camp, Prow was reassigned to the WBS Penguins. That season, Prow spiked offensively and was selected to participate in the AHL All-Star Classic after recording new career highs with 22 points in 32 games. His 10 goals at the end of December marked the first time a Wilkes-Barre/Scranton Penguin defensemen recorded double digits in goals by December 31 since the 2002–03 season.

Prow left the Penguins at the conclusion of his contract to sign a two-year, two-way contract as a free agent with the Florida Panthers on July 1, 2019. He was assigned to AHL affiliate, the Springfield Thunderbirds, for the duration of the 2019–20 season, collecting 9 goals and 32 points through 42 regular season games before the remainder of the season was cancelled due to the COVID-19 pandemic.

Approaching his final season under contract with the Panthers and unable to move his way up the depth chart, Prow's tenure with the club was effectively ended after he was assigned to German club, EHC München of the Deutsche Eishockey Liga (DEL) for the remainder of the season, on January 28, 2021. Through 26 regular season games in Munich, Prow demonstrated his offensive acumen with 4 goals and 20 points.

As a free agent from the Panthers at the conclusion of his contract, Prow returned from Germany and agreed to a one-year, $750,000 contract with the Buffalo Sabres on July 28, 2021.

On July 13, 2022, Prow opted to remain in the Sabres organization, agreeing to a two-year AHL contract to continue with the Rochester Americans.

On July 1, 2025, Prow left North America, returning to the German DEL, in signing a one-year contract with Grizzlys Wolfsburg.

== Career statistics ==
			Regular season					Playoffs
Season	Team	League	GP	G	A	Pts	PIM	GP	G	A	Pts	PIM
2008–09	Sauk Rapids-Rice High	USHS	24	7	25	32	2	—	—	—	—	—
2009–10	Sauk Rapids-Rice High	USHS	24	20	18	38	6	2	0	4	4	0
2010–11	Des Moines Buccaneers	USHL	59	8	14	22	28	—	—	—	—	—
2011–12	Des Moines Buccaneers	USHL	56	2	22	24	22	—	—	—	—	—
2012–13	St. Cloud State	WCHA	39	3	12	15	2	—	—	—	—	—
2013–14	St. Cloud State	NCHC	38	4	19	23	14	—	—	—	—	—
2014–15	St. Cloud State	NCHC	35	4	19	23	6	7	2	8	10	4
2015–16	St. Cloud State	NCHC	37	8	30	38	2	—	—	—	—	—
2015–16	Wilkes-Barre/Scranton Penguins	AHL	5	0	1	1	6	2	0	0	0	0
2016–17	Wilkes-Barre/Scranton Penguins	AHL	59	1	15	16	24	5	1	0	1	0
2016–17	Wheeling Nailers	ECHL	1	0	2	2	0	—	—	—	—	—
2017–18	Wilkes-Barre/Scranton Penguins	AHL	40	4	13	17	16	1	0	0	0	0
2017–18	Wheeling Nailers	ECHL	3	0	0	0	0	—	—	—	—	—
2018–19	Wilkes-Barre/Scranton Penguins	AHL	74	18	32	50	22	—	—	—	—	—
2019–20	Springfield Thunderbirds	AHL	42	9	23	32	20	—	—	—	—	—
2020–21	EHC München	DEL	26	4	16	20	4	2	0	0	0	0
2021–22	Rochester Americans	AHL	70	10	39	49	6	10	0	4	4	0
2021–22	Buffalo Sabres	NHL	4	1	0	1	0	—	—	—	—	—
2022–23	Rochester Americans	AHL	67	6	35	41	16	13	1	7	8	4
2023–24	Rochester Americans	AHL	56	4	15	19	6	5	0	2	2	2
2024–25	Rochester Americans	AHL	22	1	6	7	8	—	—	—	—	—
NHL totals			4	1	0	1	0	—	—	—	—	—

== Awards and honors ==
Award	Year
College
Hobey Baker Award top ten finalist	2015–16
All-NCHC First Team	2015–16
NCHC Player of the Year	2015–16
NCHC Defenseman of the Year	2015–16
NCHC Offensive Defenseman of the Year	2015–16
Division I AHCA All-American West First Team	2015–16
NCHC All-Tournament Team	2016
AHL
Second All-Star Team	2018–19
AHL All-Star Classic	2018–19

Awards and achievements
Preceded by Joey LaLeggia	NCHC Player of the Year; 2015–16	Succeeded by Will Butcher
Preceded by Joey LaLeggia	NCHC Defenseman of the Year; 2015–16	Succeeded by Award Discontinued
Preceded by Joey LaLeggia	NCHC Offensive Defenseman of the Year; 2015–16	Succeeded by Will Butcher
