= List of NAIH Institutions =

As of 2011, the National Association of Intercollegiate Hockey (NAIH) has 19 member institutions. The following colleges and universities are members of the NAIH for ice hockey competition:

"#" - Indicates an institution that holds concurrent membership in the American Collegiate Hockey Association

== United States ==
=== California ===
California has four member institutions.

- Chapman University
- UC San Diego
- UC Santa Barbara
- Ventura College

=== Connecticut ===
Connecticut has one member institution.

- Yale University#

=== Idaho ===
Idaho has one member institution.

- University of Idaho

=== Kentucky ===
Kentucky has one member institution.

- Northern Kentucky University#

=== Massachusetts ===
Massachusetts has one member institution.

- Middlesex Community College

=== New Hampshire ===
New Hampshire has two member institutions.

- Dartmouth College
- Southern New Hampshire University

=== New York ===
New York has seven member institutions.

- Clarkson University
- D'Youville College
- Hamilton College
- Le Moyne College
- Saint Lawrence University
- State University of New York at Canton
- State University of New York at Oneonta
- Union College

=== Ohio ===
Ohio has one member institution.

- Denison University

=== Oregon ===
Oregon has one member institution.

- Portland State University

=== Pennsylvania ===
Pennsylvania has two member institutions.

- Allegheny College
- Gannon University

=== South Dakota ===
South Dakota has one member institution.

- University of South Dakota

=== West Virginia ===
West Virginia has three member institutions.

- Marshall University
- West Liberty University
- Wheeling Jesuit University

=== Washington ===
Washington has two member institution

- Western Washington University
- Eastern Washington University

== See also ==
- List of NCAA Division I Institutions
- List of NCAA Division II Institutions
- List of NCAA Division III Institutions
