= NCHC Offensive Defenseman of the Year =

- Sport: College ice hockey
- League: NCHC

History
- First award: 2014
- Most wins: Scott Perunovich (3)
- Most recent: Eric Pohlkamp

The NCHC Offensive Defenseman of the Year is an annual award given out at the conclusion of the National Collegiate Hockey Conference regular season to the best offensive defenseman in the conference as voted by the coaches of each NCHC team.

The Offensive Defenseman of the Year was first awarded in 2014 and is a successor to the CCHA Best Defensive Defenseman which was temporarily discontinued after the first iteration of the conference dissolved due to the 2013–14 NCAA conference realignment.

== Award winners ==
Year	Winner	School
2013–14	Joey LaLeggia	Denver
2014–15	Joey LaLeggia	Denver
2015–16	Ethan Prow	St. Cloud State
2016–17	Will Butcher	Denver
2017–18	Scott Perunovich	Minnesota–Duluth
2018–19	Scott Perunovich	Minnesota–Duluth
2019–20	Scott Perunovich	Minnesota–Duluth
2020–21	Ronnie Attard	Western Michigan
2021–22	Ronnie Attard	Western Michigan
2022–23	Michael Benning	Denver
2023–24	Zeev Buium	Denver
2024–25	Zeev Buium	Denver
2025–26	Eric Pohlkamp	Denver

=== Winners by school ===
School	Winners
Denver	7
Minnesota–Duluth	3
Western Michigan	2
St. Cloud State	1

== See also ==
- NCHC Awards
- CCHA Best Defensive Defenseman
