= Eric Pohlkamp =

American ice hockey player (born 2004)

- Born: March 23, 2004 (age 22) Brainerd, Minnesota, U.S.
- Height: 5 ft 11 in (180 cm)
- Weight: 210 lb (95 kg; 15 st 0 lb)
- Position: Defense
- Shoots: Right
- NHL team: San Jose Sharks
- NHL draft: 132nd overall, 2023; San Jose Sharks
- Playing career: 2026–present

Eric Pohlkamp (born March 23, 2004) is an American professional ice hockey defenseman for the San Jose Sharks of the National Hockey League (NHL). He previously played college ice hockey for Bemidji State University and the University of Denver. Pohlkamp was drafted in the 5th round (132nd overall) in 2023 and made his NHL debut in November 2026.

== Playing career ==
=== Junior ===
Pohlkamp played two seasons for the Cedar Rapids RoughRiders of the United States Hockey League (USHL). During the 2021–22 season, he recorded seven goals and 11 assists in 61 games. During the 2022–23 season, he recorded 16 goals and 35 assists in 59 games. He led all defensemen in the league in points (51), power play goals (9), and power play points (27). Following the season he was named to the All-USHL First Team, and USHL Defenseman of the Year.

He was drafted in the fifth round, 132nd overall, by the San Jose Sharks in the 2023 NHL entry draft.

=== College ===
On January 19, 2022, Pohlkamp committed to play college ice hockey at Bemidji State. During the 2023–24 season. In his freshman year, he recorded 11 goals and 13 assists in 32 games. He led all team defensemen in goals, and ranked second in points. He also led the team in shots (121) power-play goals (5) and game-winning goals (3). During conference play he led all CCHA defensemen with six goals and 68 shots, and ranked third with 16 points. Following the season he was named to the All-CCHA Rookie team and All-CCHA First team.

Following his freshman year, he transferred to Denver in April 2024. During the 2024–25 season, in his sophomore year, he recorded 11 goals and 24 assists in 44 games, and led the team with 60 blocked shots. He ranked fourth in the NCAA among defensemen in scoring and was tied for fifth in goals.

During the 2025–26 season, in his junior year, he recorded 39 points (18 goals, 21 assists) in 41 games. He led all Denver players and NCAA defensemen in goals and points. He also ranked first among all skaters in the country with 185 shots on goal, and led the team with 77 blocked shots. On October 11, 2025, during the home opening game of the season against Bentley, he scored his first career hat-trick. He became the fourth defenseman in NCHC history to record a hat-trick. His 18 goals are the most in a single season by a defenseman in conference history. In 24 conference games he led all NCHC defensemen in points (22) and goals (9). The Denver Pioneers won the 2026 NCAA National Championship, with Pohlkamp recording one goal and one assist over the course of the tournament. Following the season he was named to the All-NCHC First Team and named NCHC Offensive Defenseman of the Year. He was also named a top-three finalist for the Hobey Baker Award.

=== Professional ===
On April 11, 2026, Pohlkamp was named the 2025–26 Sharks Prospect of the Year by Sharks' management and staff.

Pohlkamp signed a two-year entry-level contract with the San Jose Sharks on April 16, 2026. Pohlkamp made his professional hockey debut on April 24 with the San Jose Barracuda, the American Hockey League (AHL) affiliate team of the Sharks, during the Calder Cup Playoffs. That same night, he recorded his first professional point, an assist, in what would be a 5–1 loss, resulting in the Barracuda being eliminated from the playoffs.

Pohlkamp started the 2026–27 season with the Barracuda, recording seven assists over his first 10 games. He was recalled by the Sharks on November 3, 2026, and made his NHL debut the following night on November 4 in a 2–7 loss against the Los Angeles Kings. Pohlkamp recorded his first NHL point, an assist, on November 7 in a 3–4 loss against the Dallas Stars. He scored his first NHL goal on November 14 in a 6–5 shootout win over the Utah Mammoth.

== International play ==
Medal record

Representing United States

Ice hockey

World Junior Championships
Gold medal – first place	2024 Sweden	

In December 2023, Pohlkamp was named to the United States men's national junior ice hockey team to compete at the 2024 World Junior Ice Hockey Championships. He became the first Bemidji State player to represent the United States at the IIHF World Junior Championship. During the tournament he recorded one goal and two assists in seven games and won a gold medal.

== Personal life ==
Pohlkamp was born to Joe and Mary Pohlkamp. His older brothers, Matt and Chris Pohlkamp, played college ice hockey at Bowling Green and then professionally in Europe.

== Career statistics ==
=== Regular season and playoffs ===
			Regular season					Playoffs
Season	Team	League	GP	G	A	Pts	PIM	GP	G	A	Pts	PIM
2021–22	Cedar Rapids RoughRiders	USHL	61	7	11	18	22	2	0	0	0	0
2022–23	Cedar Rapids RoughRiders	USHL	59	16	35	51	26	—	—	—	—	—
2023–24	Bemidji State University	CCHA	32	11	13	24	18	—	—	—	—	—
2024–25	University of Denver	NCHC	44	11	24	35	20	—	—	—	—	—
2025–26	University of Denver	NCHC	43	18	21	39	33	—	—	—	—	—
2025–26	San Jose Barracuda	AHL	—	—	—	—	—	1	0	1	1	0
NCAA totals			119	40	58	98	73	—	—	—	—	—

=== International ===
Year	Team	Event	Result	GP	G	A	Pts	PIM
2024	United States	WJC	1st place, gold medalist(s)	7	1	2	3	4
Junior totals				7	1	2	3	4

== Awards and honors ==
Award	Year	Ref
USHL
All-USHL First Team	2023	
Defenseman of the Year	2023	
College
All-CCHA Rookie Team	2024	
All-CCHA First Team	2024	
All-NCHC Third Team	2025	
All-NCHC First Team	2026	
NCHC Offensive Defenseman of the Year	2026	
AHCA West First Team All-American	2026	

Awards and achievements
Preceded by Zeev Buium	NCHC Offensive Defenseman of the Year; 2025–26	Succeeded by Incumbent
