= NCHC Player of the Year =

- Sport: College ice hockey
- League: NCHC

History
- First award: 2014
- Most recent: Max Plante

The NCHC Player of the Year is an annual award given out at the conclusion of the National Collegiate Hockey Conference regular season to the best player in the conference as voted by the coaches of each NCHC team.

The Player of the Year was first awarded in 2014 and is a successor to the CCHA Player of the Year which was temporarily discontinued after the first iteration of the conference dissolved due to the 2013–14 NCAA conference realignment.

== Award winners ==
Year	Winner	Position	School
2013–14	Josh Archibald	Right Wing	Omaha
2014–15	Joey LaLeggia	Defenseman	Denver
2015–16	Ethan Prow	Defenseman	St. Cloud State
2016–17	Will Butcher	Defenseman	Denver
2017–18	Henrik Borgström	Center	Denver
2018–19	Jimmy Schuldt	Defenseman	St. Cloud State
2019–20	Scott Perunovich	Defenseman	Minnesota–Duluth
2020–21	Shane Pinto	Center	North Dakota
2021–22	Bobby Brink	Right Wing	Denver
2022–23	Jason Polin	Right Wing	Western Michigan
2023–24	Jackson Blake	Right Wing	North Dakota
2024–25	Zeev Buium	Defenseman	Denver
2025–26	Max Plante	Center	Minnesota–Duluth

=== Winners by school ===
School	Winners
Denver	5
Minnesota–Duluth	2
North Dakota	2
St. Cloud State	2
Omaha	1
Western Michigan	1

=== Winners by position ===
Position	Winners
Defenseman	6
Right Wing	4
Center	3
Goaltender	0
Left Wing	0

== See also ==
- NCHC Awards
- List of CCHA Player of the Year
