= Joey LaLeggia =

Canadian ice hockey player (born 1992)

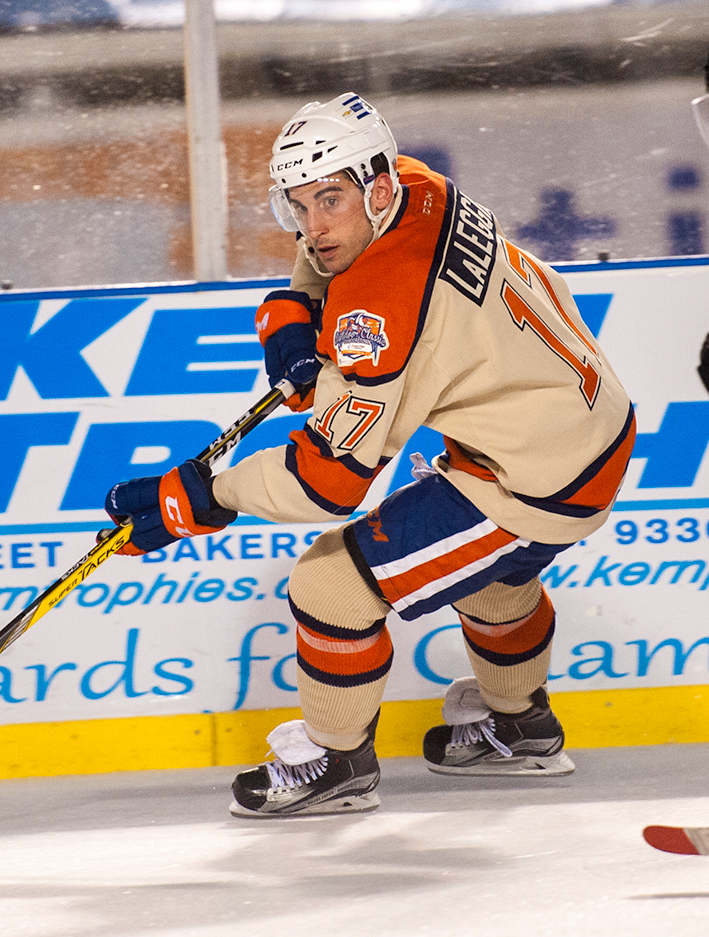
- LaLeggia with the Bakersfield Condors in 2017
- Born: June 24, 1992 (age 34) Burnaby, British Columbia, Canada
- Height: 5 ft 10 in (178 cm)
- Weight: 185 lb (84 kg; 13 st 3 lb)
- Position: Defence
- Shoots: Left
- SHL team Former teams: Djurgårdens IF; Rögle BK; Timrå IK; HV71; HC Lugano
- NHL draft: 123rd overall, 2012; Edmonton Oilers
- Playing career: 2015–present

Joseph LaLeggia (born June 24, 1992) is a Canadian professional ice hockey defenceman who currently plays for Djurgårdens IF in the Swedish Hockey League (SHL). LaLeggia was drafted 123rd overall in the 2012 NHL entry draft by the Edmonton Oilers.

== Playing career ==
LaLeggia played collegiate hockey for the Denver Pioneers in NCAA's Division I in the National Collegiate Hockey Conference (NCHC) conference. LaLeggia came to the Denver Pioneers after playing junior hockey in the British Columbia Hockey League with the Penticton Vees.

On March 31, 2015, upon completing his senior year LaLeggia signed his first professional contract in agreeing to a two-year entry-level deal with the Edmonton Oilers.

During his first season with the Oilers organization, LaLeggia recorded 27 points in 63 games with the Bakersfield Condors of the American Hockey League. He improved his scoring totals the following season, recording 38 points. On July 12, 2017, the Oilers re-signed LaLeggia to a one-year, two-way contract worth $700,000 at the NHL level.

On July 1, 2018, having left the Oilers in the off-season as a free agent, LaLeggia agreed to a two-year, two-way contract with the St. Louis Blues.

Following the conclusion of his contract with the Blues, having played exclusively with affiliate, the San Antonio Rampage, LaLeggia opted to pursue a European career, by signing a one-year contract for the remainder of the 2020–21 season with Swedish club, Rögle BK of the SHL, on January 17, 2021.

In helping Rögle BK reach the SHL finals, LaLeggia opted to remain in the SHL by signing an initial one-year contract with fellow SHL outfit, Timrå IK, on June 9, 2021.

During his second season with Timrå IK in the 2022–23 campaign, LaLeggia registered 2 goals and 5 points through 9 games before transferring to newly promoted HV71 on October 19, 2022.

== Career statistics ==
			Regular season					Playoffs
Season	Team	League	GP	G	A	Pts	PIM	GP	G	A	Pts	PIM
2008–09	Penticton Vees	BCHL	2	0	0	0	0	—	—	—	—	—
2009–10	Penticton Vees	BCHL	54	13	52	65	19	16	2	10	12	8
2010–11	Penticton Vees	BCHL	58	20	62	82	47	9	1	9	10	12
2011–12	University of Denver	WCHA	43	11	27	38	35	—	—	—	—	—
2012–13	University of Denver	WCHA	39	11	18	29	31	—	—	—	—	—
2013–14	University of Denver	NCHC	37	12	13	25	36	—	—	—	—	—
2014–15	University of Denver	NCHC	37	15	25	40	56	—	—	—	—	—
2014–15	Oklahoma City Barons	AHL	5	1	1	2	2	2	0	0	0	0
2015–16	Bakersfield Condors	AHL	63	8	19	27	38	—	—	—	—	—
2016–17	Bakersfield Condors	AHL	67	20	18	38	30	—	—	—	—	—
2017–18	Bakersfield Condors	AHL	68	15	28	43	32	—	—	—	—	—
2018–19	San Antonio Rampage	AHL	71	16	31	47	30	—	—	—	—	—
2019–20	San Antonio Rampage	AHL	50	7	14	21	16	—	—	—	—	—
2020–21	Rögle BK	SHL	12	2	3	5	2	14	1	1	2	4
2021–22	Timrå IK	SHL	52	9	29	38	24	—	—	—	—	—
2022–23	Timrå IK	SHL	9	2	3	5	4	—	—	—	—	—
2022–23	HV71	SHL	40	16	17	33	10	—	—	—	—	—
2023–24	HC Lugano	NL	39	9	17	26	10	—	—	—	—	—
2024–25	HV71	SHL	33	3	23	26	8	—	—	—	—	—
AHL totals			324	67	111	178	148	2	0	0	0	0
SHL totals			146	32	75	107	48	14	1	1	2	4

== Awards and honours ==
Medal record

Ice hockey

Representing Canada West

World Junior A Challenge
Silver medal – second place	2009 Summerside	

Award	Year
College
All-WCHA Rookie Team	2011–12
WCHA Rookie of the Year	2011–12
All-WCHA First Team	2011–12
All-WCHA Second Team	2012–13
All-NCHC First Team	2013–14
AHCA West Second-Team All-American	2013–14
NCHC All-Tournament Team	2014
Hobey Baker Award Finalist	2014–15

Awards and achievements
Preceded by Jason Zucker	WCHA Rookie of the Year; 2011–12	Succeeded by Stephon Williams
Preceded by T. J. Tynan	NCAA Rookie of the Year; 2011–12	Succeeded by Jon Gillies
Preceded by Josh Archibald	NCHC Player of the Year; 2014–15	Succeeded by Ethan Prow
Preceded by Award Created	NCHC Defenseman of the Year; 2013–14, 2014–15	Succeeded by Ethan Prow
Preceded by Award Created	NCHC Offensive Defenseman of the Year; 2013–14, 2014–15	Succeeded by Ethan Prow
