= Taylor Ward (ice hockey) =

Canadian ice hockey player (born 1998)

- Born: March 31, 1998 (age 28) Kelowna, British Columbia, Canada
- Height: 6 ft 2 in (188 cm)
- Weight: 194 lb (88 kg; 13 st 12 lb)
- Position: Winger
- Shoots: Right
- NHL team (P) Cur. team: Los Angeles Kings; Ontario Reign (AHL)
- NHL draft: Undrafted
- Playing career: 2022–present

Taylor Ward (born March 31, 1998) is a Canadian professional ice hockey player who is a winger for the Ontario Reign of the American Hockey League (AHL) while under contract to the Los Angeles Kings of the National Hockey League (NHL).

== Playing career ==
Ward was never drafted but signed with the Kings as a free agent in 2022, following a four-year stint with the Omaha Mavericks. Taylor's father Dixon also played in the NHL, including 34 games with the Kings.

Ward made his NHL debut with the Kings on April 17, 2025, against the Calgary Flames where he scored his first NHL goal in the 3rd period. He was returned to the Reign the following day.

On July 2, 2025, Ward was re-signed to a one-year, two-way contract with the Los Angeles Kings for the 2025–26 season. On January 26, 2026, Ward signed a two-year contract extension with the Kings.

== Personal life ==
Ward is the son of Dixon Ward who played in the NHL between 1992 and 2003. Ward has Canadian and American citizenship.

== Career statistics ==
			Regular season					Playoffs
Season	Team	League	GP	G	A	Pts	PIM	GP	G	A	Pts	PIM
2014–15	Penticton Vees	BCHL	2	1	0	1	0	1	0	0	0	0
2015–16	Penticton Vees	BCHL	56	5	4	9	28	11	1	0	1	6
2016–17	Penticton Vees	BCHL	58	9	14	23	33	21	4	5	9	4
2017–18	Penticton Vees	BCHL	46	21	23	44	34	11	6	9	15	4
2018–19	U. of Nebraska-Omaha	NCHC	35	9	18	27	18	—	—	—	—	—
2019–20	U. of Nebraska-Omaha	NCHC	32	16	11	27	42	—	—	—	—	—
2020–21	U. of Nebraska-Omaha	NCHC	26	13	9	22	20	—	—	—	—	—
2021–22	U. of Nebraska-Omaha	NCHC	38	19	20	39	39	—	—	—	—	—
2021–22	Ontario Reign	AHL	16	3	7	10	9	5	0	1	1	0
2022–23	Ontario Reign	AHL	71	9	17	26	46	1	0	0	0	0
2023–24	Ontario Reign	AHL	71	11	21	32	60	8	2	5	7	2
2024–25	Ontario Reign	AHL	66	12	15	27	61	2	0	0	0	2
2024–25	Los Angeles Kings	NHL	1	1	0	1	0	—	—	—	—	—
2025–26	Ontario Reign	AHL	32	12	9	21	23	—	—	—	—	—
2025–26	Los Angeles Kings	NHL	36	3	4	7	7	1	0	0	0	0
NHL totals			37	4	4	8	7	1	0	0	0	0
