= National Collegiate Hockey Association =

Defunct national organization

- Sport: Ice hockey
- Founded: 2011 – 2017
- President: Michael Smietana
- No. of teams: 25
- Country: United States
- Most recent champion: University at Buffalo (2016–17)
- Official website: NCHA.us

The National Collegiate Hockey Association (NCHA) was a national organization of men's college- and university-level ice hockey programs in the United States. The NCHA used to be known as the Collegiate Ice Hockey Association (CIHA) and the National Association of Intercollegiate Hockey (NAIH). The association was primarily composed of American Collegiate Hockey Association (ACHA) Division III teams from the Northeast.

== History ==
The NAIH was formed in 2011 as an alternative to the ACHA for hockey teams that wanted a lower cost for membership and a high level of competition. However, many teams in the NCHA were also members of the ACHA.

In the spring of 2013, the NAIH changed its name to the CIHA and after the 2013-14 season changed its name to the NCHA.

In July 2014, the NCHA was sanctioned by the United Hockey Union, a branch of Amateur Athletic Union.

== Teams ==
For the 2015–16 season, the NCHA had four conferences: North Eastern (New York), South Eastern (Pennsylvania/West Virginia), South Wwestern (California) and the Independent Conference. The champion of each conference received an automatic bid to Nationals.

- North Eastern Conference (East Division)
  - Albany College of Pharmacy and Health Sciences
  - Hamilton College
  - Le Moyne College
  - Union College
- North Eastern Conference (West Division)
  - D'Youville College
  - Medaille College
  - St. John Fisher College
  - SUNY Brockport
  - University at Buffalo
- South Eastern Conference
  - California University of Pennsylvania
  - Community College of Allegheny County
  - Penn State Altoona
  - University of Pittsburgh at Greensburg
  - West Virginia University
- South Western Conference
  - Cal Lutheran
  - Chapman
  - UC San Diego
  - UC Santa Barbara
  - Ventura College
- Independent Conference
  - Denison University
  - Otterbein University
  - Washington & Jefferson College
  - Wittenberg University

== Founders Cup Champions ==
The 2012–13 season was the first year the NAIH held a national tournament. The national championship trophy was dubbed the Founders Cup.

[[

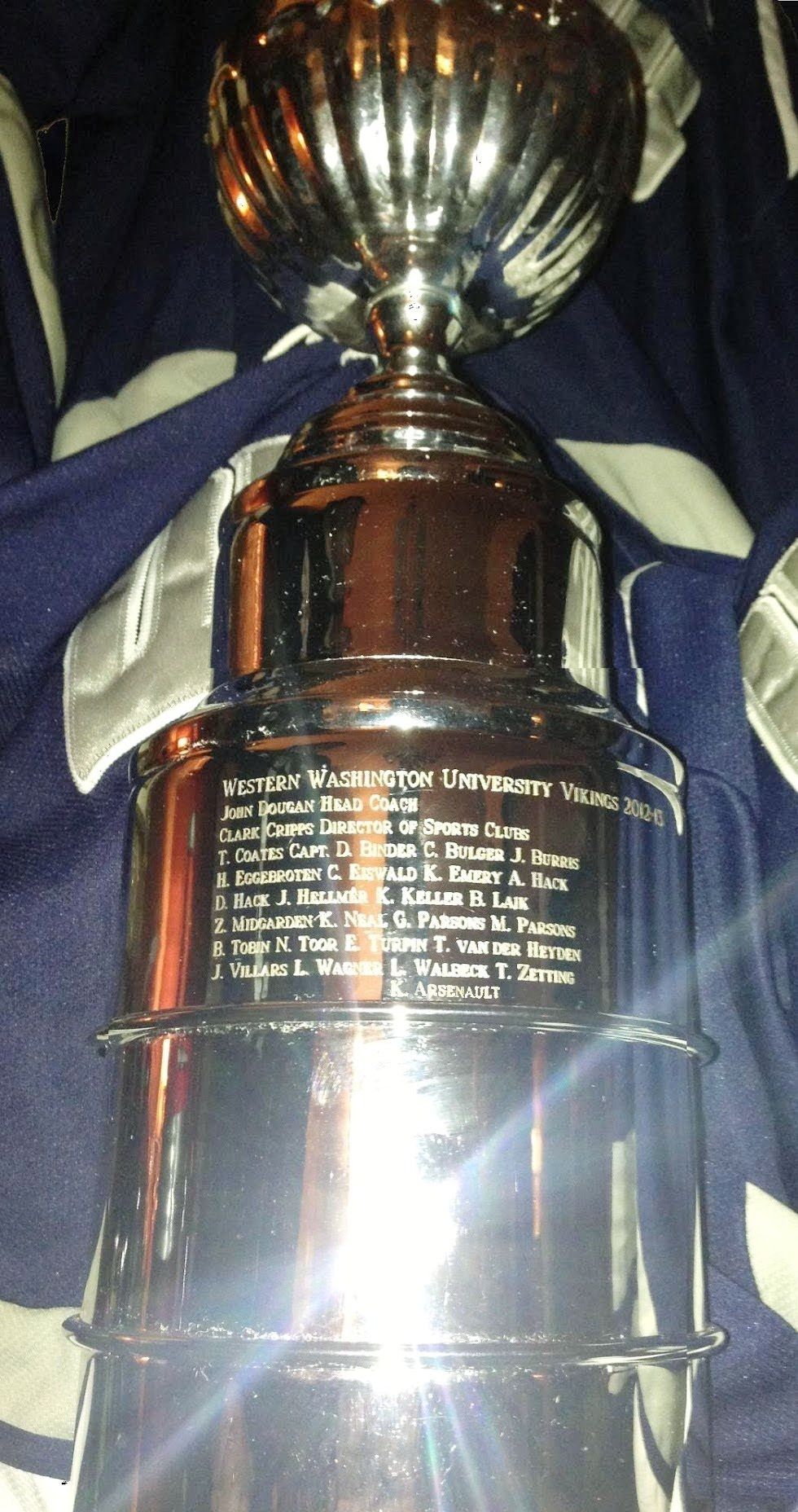
The Founder's Cup. Championship trophy for NCHA with inaugural engraving for WWU Vikings

|thumb|National Collegiate Hockey Association championship trophy The Founder's Cup.jpg]]

Year	National Champion	Runner-up	Result	Host/Location
2012–13	Western Washington	Le Moyne College	2-1 (OT)	Buffalo, New York
2013–14	Pittsburgh-Greensburg	UC San Diego	2-0	Newark, Ohio
2014–15	St. John Fisher College	Pittsburgh-Greensburg	8-5	Newark, Ohio
2015–16	University at Buffalo	Penn State Altoona	4-2	Newark, Ohio
2016–17	University at Buffalo	Union College	5-2	Amherst, New York

== See also ==
- British Columbia Intercollegiate Hockey League (BCIHL)
