= 2021–22 Minnesota State Mavericks men's ice hockey season =

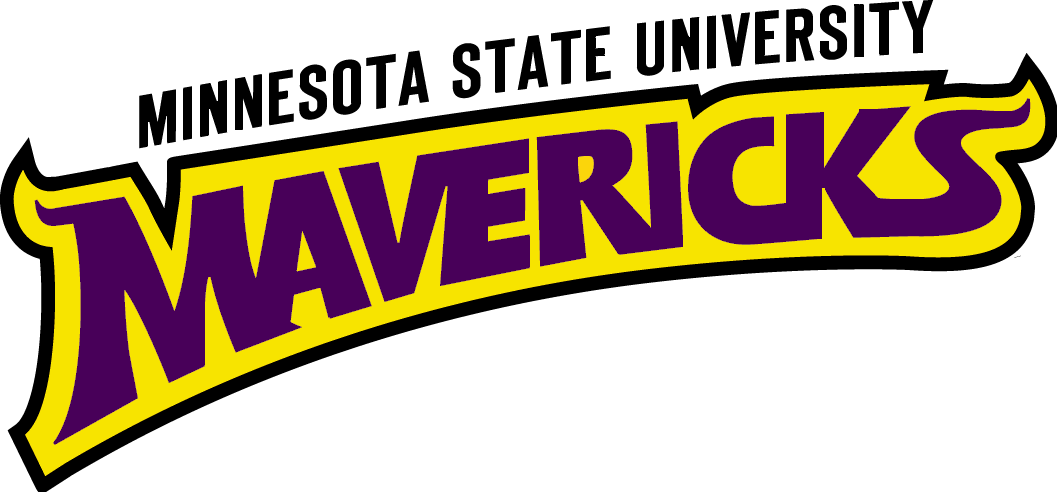

CCHA, Champion CCHA tournament, Champion NCAA tournament, runner-up
- Conference: 1st CCHA
- Home ice: Mayo Clinic Health System Event Center

Rankings
- USCHO.com: #2
- USA Today: #2

Record
- Overall: 38–6–0
- Conference: 23–3–0
- Home: 16–1–0
- Road: 16–3–0
- Neutral: 4–2–0

Coaches and captains
- Head coach: Mike Hastings
- Assistant coaches: Todd Knott; Paul Kirtland; Brennan Poderzay
- Captain: Wyatt Aamodt
- Alternate captain(s): Reggie Lutz; Jack McNeely

The 2021–22 Minnesota State Mavericks men's ice hockey season was the 53rd season of play for the program. They represented Minnesota State University, Mankato in the 2021–22 NCAA Division I men's ice hockey season and for the 1st season in the Central Collegiate Hockey Association (CCHA). They are coached by Mike Hastings, in his 10th season, and play their home games at Mayo Clinic Health System Event Center.

== Season ==
Minnesota State joined with six other members of the WCHA to restart the CCHA for the 2021–22 season. With their new conference being relatively weak in national rankings, the Mavericks scheduled several games against non-conference opponents that were expected to be very strong. MSU kicked off the season with a road series against the defending national champions Massachusetts. Dryden McKay, who was just 3 shutouts shy of tying the career record of 27 held by Ryan Miller, kicked off the campaign with an 18-save blanking of the Minutemen. That game set te tone for the entire season; Minnesota State relied on a constant offensive attack that kept the puck in their opponent's end. Holding to the maxim 'the best defense is a good offense', MSU stopped most of their opponents from generating offensive chances by forcing them to defend. When their defense was called upon, the corps, led by Jake Livingstone and captain Wyatt Aamodt, was up to the task and limited the opposing forwards to fewer than 20 shots on goal on most nights. Of those reduced shots, only a paltry number managed to get past McKay.

The Mavericks began the season by playing both of the finalists from the previous year's national championship and won three out of four games. For their third week, the team participated in the Ice Breaker Tournament and lost the championship game to Michigan, the then-#3 team in the country. While the defeat cost MSU their #1 ranking, they were still left with a very strong resume as they entered their conference schedule.

After sweeping Northern Michigan, which included McKay's record-breaking shutout, Minnesota State played probably its worst game of the season against lowly Ferris State. While the Mavs could only manage a single goal, the defense allowed the Bulldogs to get 30 shots on McKay, the most they would allow all season. The team responded by flattening their foes over the next couple of weeks, winning their next five games by an average score of nearly 6–1, including two more shutouts. While the CCHA's overall weakness held Minnesota State back, the sheer number of victories and the overwhelming nature of play could not be ignored and MSU received the #1 ranking for the second time in late-November.

McKay was forced to miss the team's first game against Lake Superior State, giving freshman Keenan Rancier his first career start. While the backup played well, allowing just 1 goal, the team's offense fell flat and they were shutout for the only time on the season. McKay returned the following night and began a run of games that was nearly unheard of in NCAA history; Minnesota State won each of their next nine games with McKay allowing a maximum of 1 goal in each affair. The stretch of 12 consecutive games by MSU of allowing less than 2 goals was the longest in Division I history. The five shutouts recorded during that run put McKay at 32 for his career and 8 on the season. He was not, however, alone for lofty goaltending statistics. both Yaniv Perets and Devon Levi were also having magical seasons for their respective programs, leading some to call the 2022 season as the 'Year of the Goaltender'.

When Minnesota State lost its fifth game of the season, they were firmly established one of the two best teams in the country (Michigan being the other). MSU was top three in both goals for and goals against as well as boasting the nation's scoring leader Nathan Smith. With that in mind, there was little surprise when, after the NHL backed out of the 2022 Winter Olympics, head coach Mike Hastings was added to Team USA's coaching staff. Smith joined soon afterwards but, despite persistent rumors, Dryden McKay was not included on the roster.

MSU did not lose a beat in their absence and won their final eleven regular season games. In winning 20 out of 21 games, Minnesota State became one of the select few teams to post 30 wins during the regular season and were rewarded by nearly sweeping the CCHA awards. They were also mathematically guaranteed to make the NCAA tournament and receive a favorable seeding for at least the opening round.

=== CCHA tournament ===
The Mavericks continued their inspired play in the postseason, posting a pair of wins over St. Thomas to all but guarantee MSU one of the four #1 seeds. A demolition of Northern Michigan, who had upset the Mavs the year before, sealed a top seed and set the team up for a showdown against Bemidji State. The Beavers were fighting for a tournament appearance, being ranked too low to earn an at-large bid, and gave the Mavericks everything they had. MSU was held scoreless for more than half the game and, when Bemidji netted the first goal around the mid-way point of the match, it appeared that the boys in green may have had a chance. Fortunately for the Mavericks, their power play, which had been a strength for them all season, provided them with the tying goal and forced the game into overtime. Less than three minutes into the extra session, The puck found its way into the Bemidji cage and Minnesota won the revived CCHA championship.

Half an hour later, after hoisting the trophy and heading to the locker room, both teams were called back onto the ice. While the goal was initially ruled to be a 'good goal', a camera angle that had initially not been available to replay showed conclusively than the puck had gone under the goal cage rather than through the 4-by-6 opening. The goal was waved off and both teams were recalled to the ice to resume the game. Luckily for the Mavericks, their very next shot went into the goal cleanly and they were able to celebrate a championship after what is described as 'the craziest championship ever'. The win was also McKay's 35 victory on the season, breaking the record that had jointly been held by college hockey legends Robb Stauber and Marty Turco.

=== NCAA tournament ===
MSU received the #2 overall seed and began their run facing Harvard, the ECAC Hockey champion. The first 35 minutes of the game was a complete mismatch. The Mavericks scored the first three goals and were completely dominating the Crimson in shots and offensive zone time. Everything changed in the later part of the second period when Sean Farrell fired a puck from behind the goal line that deflected in off of McKay's skate. Less than a minute later Harvard netted their second goal and had reduced the Mavericks' advantage to just 1. Ondřej Pavel scored on a rush early in the third to put a little distance between the two but Harvard would not go away and they netted a third marker on the power play with 3:31 left on the clock. The Crimson went on a furious charge at the MSU cage and twice had looks at a half-open cage. Luck was with the Mavs, however, as both shots went awry and Minnesota State escaped with a 4–3 victory.

The quarterfinal match against Notre Dame turned into a classic goaltending battle with both McKay and Matthew Galajda playing nearly perfect games. While MSU more than doubled up the Irish in shots over the first 20 minutes, they were only able to sneak the final one into the goal with just 16 seconds remaining in the period. Smith's marker remained the only goal for the rest of the contest as both teams attacked relentlessly but to no avail. Vital to the win was MSU's penalty-kill which held Notre Dame back during their three man-advantages.

In the national semifinals, which consisted entirely of western teams, Minnesota State faced off against Minnesota. Though the two had never had much of a rivalry, this was the second time in as many years that they were meeting in the NCAA tournament. As they had all season, MSU shot out of the gate and dominated play for most of the match. It was the Gophers, however, who opened the scoring in the first. The Mavericks were undeterred and continued to assail the Minnesota net. They finally managed to break through midway through the second and that began a deluge of goals. Minnesota State scored the final 5 markers to take the game comfortably and send the team to its first ever Division I championship game appearance.

The final game of the year looked to be following a familiar format when Minnesota State controlled the puck from the opening faceoff and outshout Denver 18–8 through the first 40 minutes. Despite the disparity in play, the Mavericks only enjoyed a 1–0 lead entering the third and little room for error with how well Denver's defense was playing. In the final frame, MSU appeared to move away from the constant attack that was the hallmark of the team and played a more traditional defensive shell. This maneuver proved disastrous for the club as it allowed the Pioneers to get their offense flowing. Denver scored three times in the third and a shell-shocked Mavericks team scrambled to respond. They ended up being forced into pulling McKay for an extra attacker but all that served to do was give Denver two empty-net goals. When the final buzzer sounded, one bad period had completely sunk Minnesota State's entire season and ruined the championship hopes for the school.

=== Doping ban ===
After the season, it was reported that Dryden McKay, who had by then won the Hobey Baker Award, accepted a 6-month suspension from international hockey for testing positive for a banned substance. The United States Anti-Doping Agency could have imposed as much as a 4-year suspension, however, the body accepted the evidence that McKay provided which proved he had unwittingly consumed the substance as part of an effort to combat COVID-19. On the weekend that the team was to play Lake Superior State, a strain of the flu was going around the Mavericks' locker room. Compounded with increased worries over the Omicron variant, McKay took non-NSF-certified antiviral supplements over the course of 10 days that had been contaminated with Ostarine. The drug is typically used to combat muscle wasting and osteoporosis and has been banned by the World Anti-Doping Agency since 2008.

McKay had submitted the sample on January 23 and the results were available by January 31. Because this occurred prior to the start of the Olympics, it was likely the primary reason that McKay was left off the United States Olympic roster. Minnesota State had given a mandatory provisional suspension to McKay on February 3 but had lifted the prohibition on the same day. Since Ostarine was detected in a sealed bottle sent to a testing lab by the manufacturer, McKay was determined to have not been at fault for the positive test and remained eligible to play for the remainder of the season.

== Departures ==
Player	Position	Nationality	Cause
Colby Bukes	Defenseman	United States	Transferred to Merrimack
Todd Burgess	Forward	United States	Graduation (signed with Manitoba Moose)
Walker Duehr	Forward	United States	Graduation (signed with Calgary Flames)
Ryan Edquist	Goaltender	United States	Graduation (signed with Evansville Thunderbolts)
Evan Foss	Goaltender	United States	Left program (retired)
Dallas Gerads	Forward	United States	Graduation (signed with Greenville Swamp Rabbits)
Jake Jaremko	Forward	United States	Graduation (signed with Florida Everblades)
Shane McMahan	Forward	United States	Left program (retired)
Jared Spooner	Forward	United States	Graduation (retired)
Chris Van Os-Shaw	Forward	Canada	Transferred to American International
Riese Zmolek	Defenseman	United States	Graduation (signed with Iowa Wild)

== Recruiting ==
Player	Position	Nationality	Age	Notes
Steven Bellini	Defenseman	Canada	21	Sault Ste. Marie, ON
Josh Groll	Forward	United States	20	San Diego, CA; transfer from Michigan
Will Hillman	Forward	United States	20	Blaine, MN
Zach Krajnik	Forward	United States	22	Eagle River, AK
Benton Maass	Defenseman	United States	22	Elk River, MN; graduate transfer from New Hampshire; selected 182nd overall in 2017
Andrew Miller	Goaltender	United States	21	Boulder, CO
Brenden Olson	Forward	United States	20	Eau Claire, WI
Keenan Rancier	Goaltender	Canada	21	Victoria, BC
David Silye	Forward	Canada	22	Arnprior, ON; transfer from Clarkson
Bennett Zmolek	Defenseman	United States	19	Rochester, MN

== Roster ==
As of August 20, 2021.

No.	Nat.	Player	Class	Pos	Height	Weight	DoB	Hometown	Previous team	NHL rights
2	(Canada)	Akito Hirose	Sophomore	D	6' 0" (1.83 m)	170 lb (77 kg)	1999-04-09	Calgary, Alberta	Salmon Arm Silverbacks (BCHL)	—
3	(United States)	Jack McNeely (A)	Senior	D	6' 3" (1.91 m)	185 lb (84 kg)	1996-12-16	Lakeville, Minnesota	Muskegon Lumberjacks (USHL)	—
4	(United States)	Andy Carroll	Senior	D	5' 10" (1.78 m)	178 lb (81 kg)	1997-02-17	Northfield, Minnesota	Green Bay Gamblers (USHL)	—
6	(United States)	Sam Morton	Junior	D	6' 0" (1.83 m)	174 lb (79 kg)	1999-07-28	Lafayette, Colorado	Wenatchee Wild (BCHL)	—
7	(United States)	Wyatt Aamodt (C)	Senior	D	5' 11" (1.8 m)	201 lb (91 kg)	1997-11-22	Hermantown, Minnesota	Lincoln Stars (USHL)	—
8	(United States)	Nathan Smith	Junior	F	6' 0" (1.83 m)	185 lb (84 kg)	1998-10-18	Hudson, Florida	Cedar Rapids RoughRiders (USHL)	WPG, 91st overall 2018
9	(United States)	Tanner Edwards	Freshman	F	6' 0" (1.83 m)	170 lb (77 kg)	2000-03-11	Anchorage, Alaska	Muskegon Lumberjacks (USHL)	—
10	(Canada)	David Silye	Sophomore	F	5' 11" (1.8 m)	187 lb (85 kg)	1999-03-02	Arnprior, Ontario	Clarkson (ECAC)	—
11	(United States)	Benton Maass	Senior	D	6' 3" (1.91 m)	205 lb (93 kg)	1998-11-25	Elk River, Minnesota	New Hampshire (HEA)	WSH, 182nd overall 2017
12	(United States)	Josh Groll	Sophomore	F	5' 11" (1.8 m)	175 lb (79 kg)	2001-08-09	San Diego, California	Michigan (Big Ten)	—
13	(United States)	Brendan Furry	Junior	F	6' 0" (1.83 m)	180 lb (82 kg)	1998-07-08	Toledo, Ohio	Tri-City Storm (USHL)	—
14	(United States)	Ryan Sandelin	Junior	F	6' 0" (1.83 m)	192 lb (87 kg)	1999-01-03	Hermantown, Minnesota	Penticton Vees (BCHL)	—
15	(Germany)	Julian Napravnik	Senior	F	5' 11" (1.8 m)	167 lb (76 kg)	1997-05-06	Bad Nauheim, Germany	Des Moines Buccaneers (USHL)	—
16	(United States)	Reggie Lutz (A)	Senior	F	5' 10" (1.78 m)	178 lb (81 kg)	1996-10-18	Elk River, Minnesota	Chicago Steel (USHL)	—
17	(United States)	Bennett Zmolek	Freshman	D	6' 3" (1.91 m)	190 lb (86 kg)	2002-04-17	Rochester, Minnesota	Youngstown Phantoms (USHL)	—
18	(Czech Republic)	Ondřej Pavel	Sophomore	F	6' 2" (1.88 m)	205 lb (93 kg)	2000-08-29	Prague, Czech Republic	Fargo Force (USHL)	—
19	(United States)	Will Hillman	Freshman	F	6' 2" (1.88 m)	198 lb (90 kg)	2000-11-22	Blaine, Minnesota	Youngstown Phantoms (USHL)	—
20	(Canada)	Connor Gregga	Sophomore	F	5' 10" (1.78 m)	175 lb (79 kg)	2000-07-24	Markham, Ontario	Coquitlam Express (BCHL)	—
21	(United States)	Lucas Sowder	Junior	F	5' 11" (1.8 m)	170 lb (77 kg)	1998-11-15	Trinity, Florida	Wenatchee Wild (BCHL)	—
22	(Canada)	Steven Bellini	Freshman	D	5' 11" (1.8 m)	170 lb (77 kg)	2000-05-23	Sault Ste. Marie, Ontario	Tri-City Storm (USHL)	—
23	(Canada)	Jake Livingstone	Sophomore	D	6' 4" (1.93 m)	205 lb (93 kg)	1999-04-16	Creston, British Columbia	Langley Rivermen (BCHL)	—
24	(United States)	Zach Krajnik	Freshman	F	5' 11" (1.8 m)	172 lb (78 kg)	1999-05-13	Eagle River, Alaska	Kenai River Brown Bears (NAHL)	—
25	(United States)	Brenden Olson	Freshman	F	6' 1" (1.85 m)	173 lb (78 kg)	2000-10-18	Eau Claire, Wisconsin	Sioux City Musketeers (USHL)	—
27	(United States)	Tony Malinowski	Sophomore	D	6' 4" (1.93 m)	210 lb (95 kg)	1999-10-15	Clarkston, Michigan	Des Moines Buccaneers (USHL)	—
28	(United States)	Cade Borchardt	Junior	F	5' 10" (1.78 m)	175 lb (79 kg)	1998-07-06	Burnsville, Minnesota	Sioux Falls Stampede (USHL)	—
29	(United States)	Dryden McKay	Senior	G	5' 11" (1.8 m)	175 lb (79 kg)	1997-11-25	Downers Grove, Illinois	Madison Capitols (USHL)	—
32	(United States)	Andrew Miller	Freshman	G	6' 0" (1.83 m)	182 lb (83 kg)	2000-02-10	Boulder, Colorado	Fargo Force (USHL)	—
35	(Canada)	Keenan Rancier	Freshman	G	6' 2" (1.88 m)	184 lb (83 kg)	2000-06-21	Victoria, British Columbia	Minot Minotauros (NAHL)	—

== Standings ==
2021–22 Central Collegiate Hockey Association Standings
	Conference record										Overall record					
	GP	W	L	T	OTW	OTL	3/SW	PTS	GF	GA	GP	W	L	T	GF	GA
#2 Minnesota State †*	26	23	3	0	2	0	0	67	115	28	44	38	6	0	178	60
#14 Michigan Tech	26	16	8	2	2	4	0	54	93	53	37	21	13	3	118	75
Bemidji State	26	14	12	0	1	1	0	42	83	81	39	19	20	0	118	121
Lake Superior State	26	13	13	0	1	1	0	39	69	64	37	18	18	1	107	104
Northern Michigan	26	12	13	1	3	0	1	35	86	99	37	20	16	1	132	136
Bowling Green	26	11	14	1	2	1	0	33	67	87	37	15	19	3	94	119
Ferris State	26	9	16	1	2	2	0	28	66	99	36	11	24	1	90	135
St. Thomas	26	3	22	1	0	4	0	14	45	112	36	3	32	1	61	168
Championship: March 19, 2022 † indicates conference regular season champion (MacNaughton Cup) * indicates conference tournament champion (Mason Cup); Rankings: USCHO.com Top 20 Poll

== Schedule and results ==
Date	Time	Opponent^{#}	Rank^{#}	Site	TV	Decision	Result	Attendance	Record
Regular season
October 2	6:30 PM	at #1 Massachusetts*	#5	Mullins Center • Amherst, Massachusetts		McKay	W 2–0	8,412	1–0–0
October 3	3:00 PM	at #1 Massachusetts*	#5	Mullins Center • Amherst, Massachusetts		McKay	W 6–3	3,808	2–0–0
October 8	7:07 PM	#2 St. Cloud State*	#1	Mayo Clinic Health System Event Center • Mankato, Minnesota	Spectrum 191	McKay	W 1–0	4,555	3–0–0
October 9	6:07 PM	#2 St. Cloud State*	#1	Mayo Clinic Health System Event Center • Mankato, Minnesota	Spectrum 191	McKay	L 1–3	4,838	3–1–0
Ice Breaker Tournament
October 15	4:07 PM	#10 Providence*	#1	AMSOIL Arena • Duluth, Minnesota (Ice Breaker Semifinal)		McKay	W 5–2	— (Note: Spectators were in attendance, but the exact number was not reported.)	4–1–0
October 16	4:07 PM	vs. #3 Michigan*	#1	AMSOIL Arena • Duluth, Minnesota (Ice Breaker Championship)		McKay	L 2–3	—	4–2–0
Regular season
October 29	7:07 PM	Northern Michigan	#3	Mayo Clinic Health System Event Center • Mankato, Minnesota		McKay	W 4–2	3,952	5–2–0 (1–0–0)
October 30	6:07 PM	Northern Michigan	#3	Mayo Clinic Health System Event Center • Mankato, Minnesota		McKay	W 7–0	4,004	6–2–0 (2–0–0)
November 5	6:07 PM	at Ferris State	#2	Ewigleben Arena • Big Rapids, Michigan		McKay	L 1–2	1,745	6–3–0 (2–1–0)
November 6	5:07 PM	at Ferris State	#2	Ewigleben Arena • Big Rapids, Michigan		McKay	W 5–1	1,776	7–3–0 (3–1–0)
November 12	7:07 PM	Bowling Green	#3	Mayo Clinic Health System Event Center • Mankato, Minnesota	CCMk–14	McKay	W 9–2	4,260	8–3–0 (4–1–0)
November 13	6:07 PM	Bowling Green	#3	Mayo Clinic Health System Event Center • Mankato, Minnesota	CCMk–14	McKay	W 5–3	4,187	9–3–0 (5–1–0)
November 19	7:07 PM	St. Thomas	#3	Mayo Clinic Health System Event Center • Mankato, Minnesota	CCMk–14	McKay	W 9–0	3,875	10–3–0 (6–1–0)
November 20	7:07 PM	at St. Thomas	#3	St. Thomas Ice Arena • Mendota Heights, Minnesota		McKay	W 5–0	885	11–3–0 (7–1–0)
November 26	6:07 PM	at Lake Superior State	#1	Taffy Abel Arena • Sault Ste. Marie, Michigan		Rancier	L 0–1	822	11–4–0 (7–2–0)
November 27	5:07 PM	at Lake Superior State	#1	Taffy Abel Arena • Sault Ste. Marie, Michigan		McKay	W 3–0	1,014	12–4–0 (8–2–0)
December 3	7:07 PM	Michigan Tech	#2	Mayo Clinic Health System Event Center • Mankato, Minnesota	CCMk–14	McKay	W 2–1	4,522	13–4–0 (9–2–0)
December 4	6:07 PM	Michigan Tech	#2	Mayo Clinic Health System Event Center • Mankato, Minnesota	CCMk–14	McKay	W 3–1	4,494	14–4–0 (10–2–0)
December 10	7:07 PM	at Bemidji State	#1	Sanford Center • Bemidji, Minnesota		McKay	W 5–1	2,941	15–4–0 (11–2–0)
December 11	6:07 PM	at Bemidji State	#1	Sanford Center • Bemidji, Minnesota		McKay	W 3–1	3,212	16–4–0 (12–2–0)
December 30	7:07 PM	#6 Minnesota Duluth*	#1	Mayo Clinic Health System Event Center • Mankato, Minnesota	CCMk–14	McKay	W 2–1 ^{OT}	5,117	17–4–0
January 1	7:07 PM	at #6 Minnesota Duluth*	#1	AMSOIL Arena • Duluth, Minnesota	My9	McKay	W 3–0	5,878	18–4–0
January 7	7:07 PM	Ferris State	#1	Mayo Clinic Health System Event Center • Mankato, Minnesota	CCMk–14	McKay	W 7–1	4,016	19–4–0 (13–2–0)
January 8	6:07 PM	Ferris State	#1	Mayo Clinic Health System Event Center • Mankato, Minnesota	CCMk–14	McKay	W 7–0	4,032	20–4–0 (14–2–0)
January 14	6:37 PM	at Northern Michigan	#1	Berry Events Center • Marquette, Michigan		McKay	L 2–4	2,284	20–5–0 (14–3–0)
January 15	6:37 PM	at Northern Michigan	#1	Berry Events Center • Marquette, Michigan		McKay	W 4–1	2,897	21–5–0 (15–3–0)
January 20	7:07 PM	at St. Thomas	#2	St. Thomas Ice Arena • Mendota Heights, Minnesota		McKay	W 5–1	684	22–5–0 (16–3–0)
January 22	7:07 PM	St. Thomas	#2	Blakeslee Stadium • Mankato, Minnesota (Hockey Day Minnesota)	BSN	McKay	W 7–1	—	23–5–0 (17–3–0)
January 28	7:07 PM	Arizona State*	#1	Mayo Clinic Health System Event Center • Mankato, Minnesota	CCMk–14	McKay	W 4–2	4,332	24–5–0
January 29	6:07 PM	Arizona State*	#1	Mayo Clinic Health System Event Center • Mankato, Minnesota	CCMk–14	McKay	W 5–3	4,902	25–5–0
February 4	6:07 PM	at Bowling Green	#1	Slater Family Ice Arena • Bowling Green, Ohio		McKay	W 3–1	2,854	26–5–0 (18–3–0)
February 5	6:07 PM	at Bowling Green	#1	Slater Family Ice Arena • Bowling Green, Ohio		McKay	W 5–0	3,711	27–5–0 (19–3–0)
February 18	7:07 PM	Bemidji State	#1	Mayo Clinic Health System Event Center • Mankato, Minnesota	CCMk–14	McKay	W 5–1	5,058	28–5–0 (20–3–0)
February 19	6:07 PM	Bemidji State	#1	Mayo Clinic Health System Event Center • Mankato, Minnesota	CCMk–14	McKay	W 5–1	5,130	29–5–0 (21–3–0)
February 25	6:07 PM	at #14 Michigan Tech	#1	MacInnes Student Ice Arena • Houghton, Michigan		McKay	W 2–1 ^{OT}	2,607	30–5–0 (22–3–0)
February 26	5:07 PM	at #14 Michigan Tech	#1	MacInnes Student Ice Arena • Houghton, Michigan		McKay	W 2–1	2,736	31–5–0 (23–3–0)
CCHA tournament
March 4	7:07 PM	St. Thomas*	#1	Mayo Clinic Health System Event Center • Mankato, Minnesota (Quarterfinal game 1)		McKay	W 3–2	3,351	32–5–0
March 5	6:07 PM	St. Thomas*	#1	Mayo Clinic Health System Event Center • Mankato, Minnesota (Quarterfinal game 2)		McKay	W 8–2	3,627	33–5–0
March 12	6:07 PM	Northern Michigan*	#1	Mayo Clinic Health System Event Center • Mankato, Minnesota (Semifinal)		McKay	W 8–1	4,492	34–5–0
March 19	6:07 PM	Bemidji State*	#1	Mayo Clinic Health System Event Center • Mankato, Minnesota (Championship)		McKay	W 2–1 ^{OT}	5,126	35–5–0
NCAA tournament
March 24	11:00 AM	vs. #15 Harvard*	#1	MVP Arena • Albany, New York (East Regional semifinal)	ESPNU	McKay	W 4–3	2,345	36–5–0
March 26	5:30 PM	vs. #9 Notre Dame*	#1	MVP Arena • Albany, New York (East Regional final)	ESPNU	McKay	W 1–0	3,449	37–5–0
April 7	8:30 PM	vs. #5 Minnesota*	#1	TD Garden • Boston, Massachusetts (National semifinal)	ESPNU	McKay	W 5–1	17,850	38–5–0
April 9	7:00 PM	vs. #3 Denver*	#1	TD Garden • Boston, Massachusetts (National Championship)	ESPN2	McKay	L 1–5	17,850	38–6–0
*Non-conference game. ^{#}Rankings from USCHO.com Poll. All times are in Central Time. Source:

== National championship ==
April 9, 2022; 8:00 PM	(E1) Minnesota State	1–5 (1–0, 0–0, 0–5)	(W1) Denver	TD Garden; Attendance: 17,850

Game reference
Referees: Geno Binda Jr. Jeremy Tufts; Linesmen: Bill Kingdon; Kevin Briganti

Scoring summary
Period	Team	Goal	Assist(s)	Time	Score
1st	MSU	Sam Morton (9) – PP	Sowder and Sandelin	13:59	1–0 MSU
2nd	None				
3rd	DEN	Ryan Barrow (8)	Benning and Devine	44:46	1–1
3rd	DEN	Michael Benning (15) – GW	Buium and Wright	47:33	2–1 DEN
3rd	DEN	Massimo Rizzo (12)	Mazur and Lee	53:34	3–1 DEN
3rd	DEN	Brett Stapley (18) – EN	unassisted	57:28	4–1 DEN
3rd	DEN	Cameron Wright (23) – EN	Mazur	58:00	5–1 DEN
Penalty summary
Period	Team	Player	Penalty	Time	PIM
1st	DEN	Michael Benning	Tripping	12:23	2:00
1st	MSU	Nathan Smith	Roughing	15:28	2:00
2nd	MSU	Bench	Too Many Men	27:07	2:00
3rd	MSU	Sam Morton	Tripping	45:26	2:00

Shots by period
Team	1	2	3	T
Denver	3	5	12	20
Minnesota State	8	10	10	28

Goaltenders
Team	Name	Saves	Goals against	Time on ice
DEN	Magnus Chrona	27	1	60:00
MSU	Dryden McKay	15	3	58:22

== Scoring statistics ==
Name	Position	Games	Goals	Assists	Points	PIM
Nathan Smith	C	38	19	31	50	43
Julian Napravnik	RW	40	18	31	49	10
Brendan Furry	LW	44	13	31	44	20
Cade Borchardt	F	44	15	26	41	18
Ryan Sandelin	C	41	21	13	34	28
Jake Livingstone	D	44	9	22	31	32
Reggie Lutz	RW	37	15	13	28	16
Akito Hirose	D	38	2	24	26	8
Sam Morton	F	38	9	16	25	12
Lucas Sowder	LW	37	7	16	23	4
Ondřej Pavel	C	44	12	10	22	24
David Silye	C	43	8	9	17	18
Jack McNeely	D	44	2	15	17	18
Andy Carroll	D	43	3	13	16	4
Benton Maass	D	42	3	11	14	14
Wyatt Aamodt	D	41	6	6	12	33
Josh Groll	F	40	4	8	12	4
Connor Gregga	F	31	6	4	10	12
Zach Krajnik	C	26	2	6	8	14
Bennett Zmolek	D	28	2	5	7	8
Will Hillman	F	5	1	1	2	0
Tanner Edwards	F	6	1	0	1	34
Brenden Olson	F	12	0	1	1	6
Tony Malinowski	D	17	0	1	1	8
Dryden McKay	G	43	0	1	1	2
Keenan Rancier	G	2	0	0	0	0
Steven Bellini	D	8	0	0	0	4
Bench	-	-	-	-	-	6
Total			178	314	492	400

== Goaltending statistics ==
Name	Games	Minutes	Wins	Losses	Ties	Goals against	Saves	Shut outs	SV %	GAA
Keenan Rancier	2	71	0	1	0	1	10	0	.909	0.84
Dryden McKay	43	2559	38	5	0	56	761	10	.931	1.31
Empty Net	-	18	-	-	-	3	-	-	-	-
Total	44	2649	38	6	0	60	771	10	.928	1.36

== Rankings ==
Poll	Week																									
Poll	Pre	1	2	3	4	5	6	7	8	9	10	11	12	13	14	15	16	17	18	19	20	21	22	23	24	25 (Final)
USCHO.com	5 (1)	1 (24)	1 (17)	2 (2)	3 (8)	2 (16)	3 (2)	3 (4)	1 (38)	2 (6)	1 (32)	1 (37)	1 (43)	1 (42)	2 (15)	1 (20)	1 (29)	1 (30)	1 (40)	1 (38)	1 (48)	1 (46)	1 (46)	1 (35)	-	2
USA Today	5	2 (9)	1 (10)	2	2 (6)	2 (9)	3 (1)	3 (3)	1 (25)	3 (5)	1 (15)	1 (21)	1 (28)	1 (27)	2 (9)	1 (24)	1 (25)	1 (22)	1 (28)	1 (29)	1 (32)	1 (31)	1 (30)	1 (20)	1 (22)	2

Note: USCHO did not release a poll in week 24.

== Awards and honors ==
Player	Award	Ref
Dryden McKay	Hobey Baker Award	
Mike Hastings	Spencer Penrose Award	
Dryden McKay	AHCA All-American West First Team	
Nathan Smith	AHCA All-American West First Team	
Dryden McKay	CCHA Player of the Year	
Nathan Smith	CCHA Forward of the Year	
Jake Livingstone	CCHA Defenseman of the Year	
Dryden McKay	CCHA Goaltender of the Year	
Mike Hastings	CCHA Coach of the Year	
Dryden McKay	CCHA First Team	
Jake Livingstone	CCHA First Team	
Nathan Smith	CCHA First Team	
Julian Napravnik	CCHA First Team	
Bennett Zmolek	CCHA Rookie Team	
Jack McNeely	NCAA All-Tournament Team	
Sam Morton	NCAA All-Tournament Team	

== Players drafted into the NHL ==
=== 2022 NHL entry draft ===
Round	Pick	Player	NHL team
7	217	Reese Laubach^{†}	San Jose Sharks
7	219	Cade Littler^{†}	Calgary Flames

† incoming freshman
