= 2021–22 CCHA season =

- Season: 2021–22
- Conference: CCHA
- Division: Division I
- Sport: ice hockey
- Duration: October 2, 2021– April 9, 2022
- Number of teams: 8

Regular season
- Season champions: Minnesota State
- Season MVP: Dryden McKay
- Top scorer: Brian Halonen

CCHA tournament
- Tournament champions: Minnesota State
- Runners-up: Bemidji State
- Top scorer: Sam Morton (7)

NCAA tournament
- Bids: 2
- Record: 3–2
- Best Finish: National runner-up
- Team(s): Minnesota State

The 2021–22 CCHA season was the 43rd season of play for the Central Collegiate Hockey Association and part of the 2021–22 NCAA Division I men's ice hockey season. The regular season began on October 2, 2021, and concluded on February 26, 2022. The conference tournament began on March 4 and ended on March 19, 2022.

== Revival ==
On February 18, 2020, 7 schools that had previously announced their departure from the WCHA after the 2020–21 season in order to form a new conference officially announced that their new conference would be a reestablished CCHA. Bowling Green, which had been a founding member of the CCHA in 1971 and remained in the conference until its dissolution in 2013, had retained control of the name in the interim.

A year earlier, St. Thomas was involuntarily removed from the MIAC, which would take effect after the 2020–21 scholastic year. In July 2020 the NCAA gave permission for the university to promote its athletic programs from Division III directly to Division I without the normal waiting period or ineligibilities. Within two weeks time, St. Thomas applied for and was approved as the 8th member of the conference to begin play this season.

After the conclusion of the 2020–21 season, Alabama–Huntsville, another WCHA team, submitted a bid to be accepted as the conference's 9th member. On May 5, 2021, the CCHA rejected Alabama–Huntsville's inclusion.

== Coaches ==
Enrico Blasi, formerly the head coach at Miami, was announced as St. Thomas' first head coach at the Division I level on April 2, 2021. At the start of his tenure with St. Thomas, Blasi was just 2 wins shy of 400 for his career.

=== Records ===
Team	Head coach	Season at school	Record at school	CCHA record
Bemidji State	Tom Serratore	21	335–307–92	0–0–0
Bowling Green	Ty Eigner	3	41–23–5	0–0–0
Ferris State	Bob Daniels	30	462–538–107	247–277–72
Lake Superior State	Damon Whitten	8	99–133–27	0–0–0
Michigan Tech	Joe Shawhan	5	74–64–13	0–0–0
Minnesota State	Mike Hastings	10	236–90–24	0–0–0
Northern Michigan	Grant Potulny	5	75–64–10	0–0–0
St. Thomas	Enrico Blasi	1	0–0–0	0–0–0

== Standings ==
2021–22 Central Collegiate Hockey Association Standings
	Conference record										Overall record					
	GP	W	L	T	OTW	OTL	3/SW	PTS	GF	GA	GP	W	L	T	GF	GA
#2 Minnesota State †*	26	23	3	0	2	0	0	67	115	28	44	38	6	0	178	60
#14 Michigan Tech	26	16	8	2	2	4	0	54	93	53	37	21	13	3	118	75
Bemidji State	26	14	12	0	1	1	0	42	83	81	39	19	20	0	118	121
Lake Superior State	26	13	13	0	1	1	0	39	69	64	37	18	18	1	107	104
Northern Michigan	26	12	13	1	3	0	1	35	86	99	37	20	16	1	132	136
Bowling Green	26	11	14	1	2	1	0	33	67	87	37	15	19	3	94	119
Ferris State	26	9	16	1	2	2	0	28	66	99	36	11	24	1	90	135
St. Thomas	26	3	22	1	0	4	0	14	45	112	36	3	32	1	61	168
Championship: March 19, 2022 † indicates conference regular season champion (MacNaughton Cup) * indicates conference tournament champion (Mason Cup); Rankings: USCHO.com Top 20 Poll

== Non-Conference record ==
Of the sixteen teams that are selected to participate in the NCAA tournament, ten will be via at-large bids. Those 10 teams are determined based upon the PairWise rankings. The rankings take into account all games played but are heavily affected by intra-conference results. The result is that teams from leagues which perform better in non-conference are much more likely to receive at-large bids even if they possess inferior records overall.

The CCHA was a bit of a mixed bag with their nonconference results. As many teams finished with losing records as winning marks and the league had nearly an even finish overall. The biggest drag on the CCHA was the performance against the Big Ten, which put the league in poor standings for the postseason. While the record was improved by their results against ECAC Hockey, that conference was one of the weakest for this season and didn't help as much as it might have in other years.

=== Regular season record ===
Team	Atlantic Hockey	Big Ten	ECAC Hockey	Hockey East	Independent	NCHC	Total
Bemidji State	0–0–0	0–0–0	0–0–0	0–0–0	1–1–0	1–5–0	2–6–0
Bowling Green	0–0–0	0–2–0	2–0–1	0–1–0	0–0–0	1–0–1	3–3–2
Ferris State	1–1–0	0–2–0	0–0–0	0–0–0	0–0–0	1–3–0	2–6–0
Lake Superior State	0–0–0	0–2–0	3–0–1	0–0–0	0–0–0	1–1–0	4–3–1
Michigan Tech	0–0–0	2–2–1	1–1–0	0–0–0	0–0–0	0–0–0	3–3–1
Minnesota State	0–0–0	0–1–0	0–0–0	3–0–0	2–0–0	3–1–0	8–2–0
Northern Michigan	0–0–0	0–1–0	2–0–0	2–0–0	0–0–0	2–0–0	6–1–0
St. Thomas	0–0–0	0–2–0	0–0–0	0–0–0	0–4–0	0–2–0	0–8–0
Overall	1–1–0	2–12–1	8–1–2	5–1–0	3–5–0	9–12–1	28–32–4

== Statistics ==
=== Leading scorers ===
GP = Games played; G = Goals; A = Assists; Pts = Points; PIM = Penalty minutes

Player	Class	Team	GP	G	A	Pts	PIM
Brian Halonen	Senior	Michigan Tech	26	16	20	36	18
Julian Napravnik	Senior	Minnesota State	22	13	21	34	0
Nathan Smith	Junior	Minnesota State	22	13	20	33	18
Owen Sillinger	Senior	Bemidji State	26	10	22	32	24
Trenton Bliss	Senior	Michigan Tech	25	10	21	31	18
Brendan Furry	Sophomore	Minnesota State	26	9	21	30	8
Cade Borchardt	Junior	Minnesota State	26	11	18	29	8
Hank Crone	Senior	Northern Michigan	22	9	19	28	10
Louis Boudon	Junior	Lake Superior State	26	10	18	28	25
Alex Ierullo	Senior	Bemidji State	26	11	17	28	20

=== Leading goaltenders ===
Minimum 1/3 of team's minutes played in conference games.
GP = Games played; Min = Minutes played; W = Wins; L = Losses; T = Ties; GA = Goals against; SO = Shutouts; SV% = Save percentage; GAA = Goals against average

Player	Class	Team	GP	Min	W	L	T	GA	SO	SV%	GAA
Dryden McKay	Senior	Minnesota State	25	1482	23	2	0	26	6	.942	1.05
Blake Pietila	Junior	Michigan Tech	26	1503	16	8	2	50	5	.911	1.99
Ethan Langenegger	Sophomore	Lake Superior State	16	953	8	8	0	36	3	.925	2.27
Seth Eisele	Sophomore	Lake Superior State	11	658	5	5	0	29	0	.911	2.64
Charlie Glockner	Freshman	Northern Michigan	14	686	5	3	0	32	0	.907	2.80

== Bracket ==
Quarterfinals; March 4–6
1	Minnesota State	3	8	-
8	St. Thomas	2	2	-
2	Michigan Tech	3*	3**	-
7	Ferris State	2	2	-
(Pairings are reseeded after the first round)
3	Bemidji State	1	4	3
6	Bowling Green	2	2	1
4	Lake Superior State	1	3	4
5	Northern Michigan	5	2	5

Semifinals; March 12
1	Minnesota State	8
5	Northern Michigan	1
2	Michigan Tech	2
3	Bemidji State	5

Championship; March 19
1	Minnesota State	2*
3	Bemidji State	1

Note: * denotes overtime periods

== NCAA tournament ==
=== Regional semifinal ===
==== East ====
March 24, 2022; 12:00 PM	(1) Minnesota State	4 – 3 (2–0, 1–2, 1–1)	(4) Harvard	MVP Arena; Attendance: 2,345

Game reference

Dryden McKay
Goalies
Mitchell Gibson
Referees:
Joe Sullivan
Dan Dreger
Linesmen:
Justin Hills
Geoff Shultz

(Hirose, Groll) Connor Gregga (6) – 14:12	1–0
(Hirose) Reggie Lutz (14) – PP – 17:46	2–0
(unassisted) Brendan Furry (12) – 22:06	3–0
	3–1	36:42 – Sean Farrell (11) (Coronato, Abruzzese)
	3–2	37:30 – Alex Gaffney (8) (Laferriere)
(Groll, Hirose) Ondřej Pavel (11) – GW – 45:59	4–2
	4–3	56:29 – PP EA – Casey Dornbach (9) (Farrell, Laferriere)

4 min
Penalties
6 min
40
Shots
22

==== West ====
March 24, 2022; 1:00 PM	(2) Minnesota Duluth	3 – 0 (1–0, 0–0, 2–0)	(3) Michigan Tech	Budweiser Events Center; Attendance: 3,138

Game reference

Ryan Fanti
Goalies
Blake Pietila
Referees:
Colin Kronforst
Sean Fernandez
Linesmen:
Justin Cornell
Pat Richardson

(unassisted) Kobe Roth (17) – GW – 14:54	1–0
(unassisted) Kyler Kleven (3) – 46:09	2–0
(unassisted) Kobe Roth (18) – EN – 59:53	3–0

8 min
Penalties
15 min
25
Shots
28

=== Regional final ===
==== East ====
March 26, 2022; 6:30 PM	(1) Minnesota State	1 – 0 (1–0, 0–0, 0–0)	(3) Notre Dame	MVP Arena; Attendance: 3,449

Game reference
Dryden McKay	Goalies	Matthew Galajda	Referees: Geno Bindo; Jeremy Tufts; Linesmen: Kevin Briganti; Bill Kingdon
(Furry) Nathan Smith (19) – GW – 19:44 / 1–0			Referees: Geno Bindo; Jeremy Tufts; Linesmen: Kevin Briganti; Bill Kingdon
6 min	Penalties	2 min	Referees: Geno Bindo; Jeremy Tufts; Linesmen: Kevin Briganti; Bill Kingdon
33	Shots	23	Referees: Geno Bindo; Jeremy Tufts; Linesmen: Kevin Briganti; Bill Kingdon

=== National semifinal ===
April 7, 2022; 8:30 PM	(E1) Minnesota State	5 – 1 (0–1, 2–0, 3–0)	(NE2) Minnesota	TD Garden; Attendance: 17,850

Game reference

Dryden McKay
Goalies
Justen Close
Referees:
Ryan Sweeney
Michael Schubert
Linesmen:
Anthony Valle
Shane Kanaly

	0–1	09:00 – Matthew Knies (15) (Brodzinski)
(Sowder, Pavel) Benton Maass (6) – 27:22	1–1
(Silye, Livingstone) Reggie Lutz (15) – GW – 33:31	2–1
(McNeely, Groll) Ondřej Pavel (12) – 41:57	3–1
(Morton) David Silye (8) – 53:17	4–1
(unassisted) Brendan Furry (13) – EN – 58:51	5–1

0 min
Penalties
0 min
32
Shots
17

=== National championship ===
April 9, 2022; 8:00 PM	(E1) Minnesota State	1–5 (1–0, 0–0, 0–5)	(W1) Denver	TD Garden; Attendance: 17,850

Game reference
Referees: Geno Binda Jr. Jeremy Tufts; Linesmen: Bill Kingdon; Kevin Briganti

Scoring summary
Period	Team	Goal	Assist(s)	Time	Score
1st	MSU	Sam Morton (9) – PP	Sowder and Sandelin	13:59	1–0 MSU
2nd	None				
3rd	DEN	Ryan Barrow (8)	Benning and Devine	44:46	1–1
3rd	DEN	Michael Benning (15) – GW	Buium and Wright	47:33	2–1 DEN
3rd	DEN	Massimo Rizzo (12)	Mazur and Lee	53:34	3–1 DEN
3rd	DEN	Brett Stapley (18) – EN	unassisted	57:28	4–1 DEN
3rd	DEN	Cameron Wright (23) – EN	Mazur	58:00	5–1 DEN
Penalty summary
Period	Team	Player	Penalty	Time	PIM
1st	DEN	Michael Benning	Tripping	12:23	2:00
1st	MSU	Nathan Smith	Roughing	15:28	2:00
2nd	MSU	Bench	Too Many Men	27:07	2:00
3rd	MSU	Sam Morton	Tripping	45:26	2:00

Shots by period
Team	1	2	3	T
Denver	3	5	12	20
Minnesota State	8	10	10	28

Goaltenders
Team	Name	Saves	Goals against	Time on ice
DEN	Magnus Chrona	27	1	60:00
MSU	Dryden McKay	15	3	58:22

== Ranking ==
=== USCHO ===
Team	Pre	1	2	3	4	5	6	7	8	9	10	11	12	13	14	15	16	17	18	19	20	21	22	23	Final
Bemidji State	14	15	20	19	17	20	NR	20	20	NR	NR	NR	NR	NR	NR	NR	NR	NR	NR	NR	NR	NR	NR	NR	NR
Bowling Green	NR	NR	NR	NR	NR	NR	NR	NR	NR	NR	NR	NR	NR	NR	NR	NR	NR	NR	NR	NR	NR	NR	NR	NR	NR
Ferris State	NR	NR	NR	NR	NR	NR	NR	NR	NR	NR	NR	NR	NR	NR	NR	NR	NR	NR	NR	NR	NR	NR	NR	NR	NR
Lake Superior State	NR	NR	NR	NR	NR	NR	NR	NR	NR	NR	NR	NR	NR	NR	NR	NR	NR	NR	NR	NR	NR	NR	NR	NR	NR
Michigan Tech	NR	NR	16	18	18	18	NR	NR	NR	NR	NR	18	20	19	17	18	15	14	14	14	15	13	15	14	14
Minnesota State	5	1	1	2	3	2	3	3	1	2	1	1	1	1	2	1	1	1	1	1	1	1	1	1	2
Northern Michigan	NR	NR	NR	NR	NR	NR	NR	NR	NR	NR	19	NR	NR	NR	19	20	NR	NR	NR	NR	NR	NR	NR	NR	NR
St. Thomas	NR	NR	NR	NR	NR	NR	NR	NR	NR	NR	NR	NR	NR	NR	NR	NR	NR	NR	NR	NR	NR	NR	NR	NR	NR

=== USA Today ===
Team	Pre	1	2	3	4	5	6	7	8	9	10	11	12	13	14	15	16	17	18	19	20	21	22	23	24	Final
Bemidji State	15	NR	NR	NR	NR	NR	NR	NR	NR	NR	NR	NR	NR	NR	NR	NR	NR	NR	NR	NR	NR	NR	NR	NR	NR	NR
Bowling Green	NR	NR	NR	NR	NR	NR	NR	NR	NR	NR	NR	NR	NR	NR	NR	NR	NR	NR	NR	NR	NR	NR	NR	NR	NR	NR
Ferris State	NR	NR	NR	NR	NR	NR	NR	NR	NR	NR	NR	NR	NR	NR	NR	NR	NR	NR	NR	NR	NR	NR	NR	NR	NR	NR
Lake Superior State	NR	NR	NR	NR	NR	NR	NR	NR	NR	NR	NR	NR	NR	NR	NR	NR	NR	NR	NR	NR	NR	NR	NR	NR	NR	NR
Michigan Tech	NR	NR	NR	NR	NR	NR	NR	NR	NR	NR	NR	NR	NR	NR	NR	NR	14	14	13	13	15	13	14	14	14	14
Minnesota State	5	2	1	2	2	2	3	3	1	2	1	1	1	1	2	1	1	1	1	1	1	1	1	1	1	2
Northern Michigan	NR	NR	NR	NR	NR	NR	NR	NR	NR	NR	NR	NR	NR	NR	NR	NR	NR	NR	NR	NR	NR	NR	NR	NR	NR	NR
St. Thomas	NR	NR	NR	NR	NR	NR	NR	NR	NR	NR	NR	NR	NR	NR	NR	NR	NR	NR	NR	NR	NR	NR	NR	NR	NR	NR

=== Pairwise ===
Team	1	2	3	4	5	6	7	8	9	10	11	12	13	14	15	16	17	18	19	20	21	22	Final
Bemidji State	14	49	39	24	26	19	13	14	17	16	21	23	20	18	26	26	27	26	29	29	30	29	29
Bowling Green	14	38	29	19	20	9	19	14	24	23	25	30	31	32	32	31	32	31	34	36	35	34	34
Ferris State	13	44	51	45	42	36	43	48	49	47	47	46	46	48	44	47	48	50	51	48	49	49	49
Lake Superior State	12	31	23	21	29	22	30	34	34	33	32	31	32	38	38	33	34	33	32	30	31	32	32
Michigan Tech	14	25	7	11	9	14	16	10	10	12	14	13	15	11	9	7	8	10	12	12	10	12	12
Minnesota State	5	9	10	6	6	6	5	4	5	3	1	1	1	1	2	2	2	2	2	1	1	1	2
Northern Michigan	14	15	25	35	39	34	34	30	29	25	26	28	27	26	24	26	26	28	25	26	25	26	25
St. Thomas	14	32	41	48	51	55	53	53	55	57	58	57	57	56	56	58	58	59	59	59	59	59	59

Note: teams ranked in the top-10 automatically qualify for the NCAA tournament. Teams ranked 11-16 can qualify based upon conference tournament results.

== Awards ==
=== NCAA ===
Award		Recipient
Hobey Baker Award		Dryden McKay, Minnesota State
Spencer Penrose Award		Mike Hastings, Minnesota State
AHCA All-American Teams
West First Team	Position	Team
Dryden McKay	G	Minnesota State
Nathan Smith	F	Minnesota State
West Second Team	Position	Team
Brian Halonen	F	Michigan Tech

=== CCHA ===
Award		Recipient
Player of the Year		Dryden McKay, Minnesota State
Forward of the Year		Nathan Smith, Minnesota State
Defenseman of the Year		Jake Livingstone, Minnesota State
Goaltender of the Year		Dryden McKay, Minnesota State
Rookie of the Year		Bradley Marek, Ferris State
Coach of the Year		Mike Hastings, Minnesota State
All-CCHA Teams
First Team	Position	Second Team
Dryden McKay, Minnesota State	G	Blake Pietila, Michigan Tech
Jake Livingstone, Minnesota State	D	Colin Swoyer, Michigan Tech
Elias Rosén, Bemidji State	D	Jacob Bengtsson, Lake Superior State
Nathan Smith, Minnesota State	F	Owen Sillinger, Bemidji State
Brian Halonen, Michigan Tech	F	Louis Boudon, Lake Superior State
Julian Napravnik, Minnesota State	F	Trenton Bliss, Michigan Tech
	F	AJ Vanderbeck, Northern Michigan
Rookie Team	Position	
Mattias Sholl, Bemidji State	G	
Charlie Glockner, Northern Michigan	G	
Eric Parker, Bowling Green	D	
Bennett Zmolek, Minnesota State	D	
Bradley Marek, Ferris State	F	
Austen Swankler, Bowling Green	F	
Josh Nixon, Lake Superior State	F	

=== NCAA tournament ===
All-Tournament Team
Player	Pos	Team
Jack McNeely	D	Minnesota State
Sam Morton	F	Minnesota State

== 2022 NHL entry draft ==
Round	Pick	Player	College	NHL team
7	217	Reese Laubach^{†}	Minnesota State	San Jose Sharks
7	219	Cade Littler^{†}	Minnesota State	Calgary Flames

† incoming freshman
