= 2022 CCHA men's ice hockey tournament =

2022 CCHA Men's ice hockey tournament
- Dates: March 4–19, 2022
- Teams: 8
- Finals site: Mayo Clinic Health System Event Center; Mankato, Minnesota
- Champions: Minnesota State (1st title)
- Winning coach: Mike Hastings (1st title)
- CCHA Men's Ice Hockey Tournaments

The 2022 CCHA Men's Ice Hockey Tournament was the 43rd tournament in the history of the men's Central Collegiate Hockey Association. The first tournament held after the revival of the conference, it began on March 4 and ended on March 19, 2022. All games were played at home campus sites. Minnesota State won the tournament and received the CCHA's automatic bid for the 2022 NCAA Division I Men's Ice Hockey Tournament.

== Format ==
The first round of the postseason tournament features a best-of-three games format, while the semifinals and final are single games held at the campus sites of the highest remaining seeds. All eight conference teams participated in the tournament. Teams are seeded No. 1 through No. 8 according to their final conference standings, with a tiebreaker system used to seed teams with an identical number of points accumulated. The higher-seeded teams each earned home ice and hosted one of the lower-seeded teams. The teams that advance out of the quarterfinals are reseeded according to the regular season standings. The semifinals and final are single-elimination games. The winners of the semifinals play one another to determine the conference tournament champion.

== Controversy ==
Following a 1–1 tie after regulation, the Beavers and Mavericks headed to overtime. What ensued over the next 90 minutes would be dubbed as one of the most bizarre events in college hockey history. Three minutes into overtime, MSU freshman Josh Groll scored what was believed to be the game-winning goal. Celebrations ensued as the Mavericks held a trophy presentation and skated around the ice with the Mason Cup. Meanwhile, a Bemidji State student watching the game at home noticed on a replay that the puck appeared to go into the net not through the front of the net, but rather underneath the net. If true, this would mean that the goal would not count and the game should have continued. The student sent a video of this to a friend on the team, who then showed it to Bemidji State's coach Tom Serratore in the visiting locker room. Upon seeing the video, Serratore would go back out onto the ice where the Mavericks were still celebrating to show the video to Mike Hastings and CCHA commissioner Don Lucia. The Maverick players would head back to the locker room, though shortly after, Lucia called a meeting with Hastings and Serratore to inform them they would review the goal. After it was confirmed as a no-goal, the teams were informed they would need to continue playing. After a trophy presentation and celebration, the CCHA Tournament championship resumed 79 minutes after Groll's non-goal. Just over three minutes after the game resumed, Minnesota State would score the true game-winning goal, ending the game for real.

This series of events sent reverberations throughout the college hockey world. While Minnesota State was a lock for the NCAA tournament by virtue of their pairwise ranking, Bemidji State would have needed to win the game to clinch an automatic bid to the tournament. Thus, had the Beavers won the game, they would effectively be stealing a bid from a school vying for an at-large bid, in this case, Northeastern. Luckily the resumed game led to the same result, but had the game resumed with Bemidji winning, there was talk in the Northeastern athletic department about potentially suing the CCHA over what would have cost them a tournament berth. The controversial decision to resume the game led the NCAA to clarify that a game must officially end after the referees leave the ice.

== Conference standings ==
2021–22 Central Collegiate Hockey Association Standings
| | Conference record | | | | | | | | | | Overall record | | | | | |
| | GP | W | L | T | OTW | OTL | 3/SW | PTS | GF | GA | GP | W | L | T | GF | GA |
|---|---|---|---|---|---|---|---|---|---|---|---|---|---|---|---|---|
| #2 Minnesota State †* | 26 | 23 | 3 | 0 | 2 | 0 | 0 | 67 | 115 | 28 | 44 | 38 | 6 | 0 | 178 | 60 |
| #14 Michigan Tech | 26 | 16 | 8 | 2 | 2 | 4 | 0 | 54 | 93 | 53 | 37 | 21 | 13 | 3 | 118 | 75 |
| Bemidji State | 26 | 14 | 12 | 0 | 1 | 1 | 0 | 42 | 83 | 81 | 39 | 19 | 20 | 0 | 118 | 121 |
| Lake Superior State | 26 | 13 | 13 | 0 | 1 | 1 | 0 | 39 | 69 | 64 | 37 | 18 | 18 | 1 | 107 | 104 |
| Northern Michigan | 26 | 12 | 13 | 1 | 3 | 0 | 1 | 35 | 86 | 99 | 37 | 20 | 16 | 1 | 132 | 136 |
| Bowling Green | 26 | 11 | 14 | 1 | 2 | 1 | 0 | 33 | 67 | 87 | 37 | 15 | 19 | 3 | 94 | 119 |
| Ferris State | 26 | 9 | 16 | 1 | 2 | 2 | 0 | 28 | 66 | 99 | 36 | 11 | 24 | 1 | 90 | 135 |
| St. Thomas | 26 | 3 | 22 | 1 | 0 | 4 | 0 | 14 | 45 | 112 | 36 | 3 | 32 | 1 | 61 | 168 |
Championship: March 19, 2022 † indicates conference regular season champion (MacNaughton Cup) * indicates conference tournament champion (Mason Cup); Rankings: USCHO.com Top 20 Poll

== Bracket ==
Quarterfinals; March 4–6
1 | Minnesota State | 3 | 8 | -
8 | St. Thomas | 2 | 2 | -
2 | Michigan Tech | 3* | 3** | -
7 | Ferris State | 2 | 2 | -
(Pairings are reseeded after the first round)
3 | Bemidji State | 1 | 4 | 3
6 | Bowling Green | 2 | 2 | 1
4 | Lake Superior State | 1 | 3 | 4
5 | Northern Michigan | 5 | 2 | 5

Semifinals; March 12
1 | Minnesota State | 8
5 | Northern Michigan | 1
2 | Michigan Tech | 2
3 | Bemidji State | 5

Championship; March 19
1 | Minnesota State | 2*
3 | Bemidji State | 1

Note: * denotes overtime periods

== Results ==
Note: All game times are local.

=== Quarterfinals ===
==== (1) Minnesota State vs. (8) St. Thomas ====
| March 4, 2022; 7:07 PM | Minnesota State | 3 – 2 (0–1, 1–1, 2–0) | St. Thomas | Mayo Clinic Health System Event Center; Attendance: 3,351 |

Game reference

Dryden McKay
Goalies
Peter Thome
Referees:
Scott Roth
Mike Forys
Linesmen:
Kyle Domin
Matt Tyree

| | 0–1 | 03:49 – PP – Ethan Gauer (2) (Jennings, Recchi) |
| (Sandelin, Furry) Sam Morton (6) – 23:12 | 1–1 |
| | 1–2 | 38:09 – PP – Luke Manning (8) (Zins, Grundy) |
| (Carroll, Livingstone) Sam Morton (7) – PP – 40:49 | 2–2 |
| (Hirose, Lutz) Lucas Sowder (6) – GW – 54:27 | 3–2 |

8 min
Penalties
10 min
42
Shots
13

| March 5, 2022; 6:07 PM | Minnesota State | 8 – 2 (1–1, 4–0, 3–1) | St. Thomas | Mayo Clinic Health System Event Center; Attendance: 3,627 |

Game reference

Dryden McKay
Goalies
Peter Thome
Referees:
Scott Roth
Mike Forys
Linesmen:
Kyle Domin
Matt Tyree

| (Hillman, Pavel) Connor Gregga (4) – 02:19 | 1–0 |
| | 1–1 | 11:27 – PP – Grant Loven (7) (Zins, Manning) |
| (Smith, Livingstone) Ryan Sandelin (20) – PP – 26:08 | 2–1 |
| (Morton, Napravnik) Lucas Sowder (7) – GW – 29:13 | 3–1 |
| (Smith, Napravnik) Reggie Lutz (13) – PP – 34:33 | 4–1 |
| (Furry, McNeely) Sam Morton (8) – 35:58 | 5–1 |
| | 5–2 | 42:11 – Tim Piechowski (5) (Jennings, Johnson) |
| (Gregga) Ondrej Pavel (9) – 51:21 | 6–2 |
| (Aamodt, Morton) Cade Borchardt (15) – 53:06 | 7–2 |
| (Carroll, Borchardt) Ondrej Pavel (10) – 56:12 | 8–2 |

6 min
Penalties
14 min
50
Shots
14

| Minnesota State Won Series 2–0 |

==== (2) Michigan Tech vs. (7) Ferris State ====
| March 4, 2022; 7:07 PM | Michigan Tech | 3 – 2 (OT) (0–0, 1–1, 1–1, 1–0) | Ferris State | MacInnes Student Ice Arena; Attendance: 2,016 |

Game reference

Blake Pietila
Goalies
Logan Stein
Referees:
Dan Kovarik
Shane Paskey
Linesmen:
Paul Tunison
Joe St. John

| (unassisted) Logan Ganie (5) – 25:34 | 1–0 |
| | 1–1 | 33:36 – Bradley Marek (2) (Farthing, DeVita) |
| | 1–2 | 45:30 – Jacob Dirks (8) (Faremouth, Stewart) |
| (Bliss) Tommy Parrottino (10) – PP – 50:50 | 2–2 |
| (Swoyer, Bliss) Logan Pietila (12) – GW PP – 62:28 | 3–2 |

4 min
Penalties
8 min
48
Shots
17

| March 5, 2022; 6:07 PM | Michigan Tech | 3 – 2 (2OT) (1–0, 0–0, 1–2, 0–0, 1–0) | Ferris State | MacInnes Student Ice Arena; Attendance: 2,272 |

Game reference

Blake Pietila
Goalies
Noah Giesbrecht
Referees:
Dan Kovarik
Shane Paskey
Linesmen:
Paul Tunison
Joe St. John

| (Misiak, Karow) Logan Pietila (13) – SH – 09:53 | 1–0 |
| (unassisted) Jake Crespi (1) – PS – 45:28 | 2–0 |
| | 2–1 | 46:52 – Brenden MacLaren (1) (Michaelian) |
| | 2–2 | 54:17 – Blake Evennou (8) (Tulik, Deelstra) |
| (Ganie, Crespi) Parker Saretsky (2) – GW – 86:34 | 3–2 |

12 min
Penalties
16 min
55
Shots
34

| Michigan Tech Won Series 2–0 |

==== (3) Bemidji State vs. (6) Bowling Green ====
| March 4, 2022; 7:07 PM | Bemidji State | 1 – 2 (1–1, 0–0, 0–1) | Bowling Green | Sanford Center; Attendance: 1,422 |

Game reference

Mattias Sholl
Goalies
Christian Stoever
Referees:
Brian Hill
Bruce Vida
Linesmen:
Tyler Landman
Nathan Voll

| | 0–1 | 14:44 – Ryan O'Hara (2) (Craggs, Lloyd) |
| (Ierullo, Rosén) Owen Sillinger (15) – 17:14 | 1–1 |
| | 1–2 | 51:48 – GW – Brayden Krieger (1) (unassisted) |

2 min
Penalties
2 min
27
Shots
25

| March 5, 2022; 6:07 PM | Bemidji State | 4 – 2 (2–0, 1–1, 1–1) | Bowling Green | Sanford Center; Attendance: 1,601 |

Game reference

Mattias Sholl
Goalies
Christian Stoever
Referees:
Brian Hill
Bruce Vida
Linesmen:
Tyler Landman
Nathan Voll

| (O. Sillinger, Magnuson) Lukas Sillinger (14) – 08:20 | 1–0 |
| (Ierullo, Zmolek) Sam Solensky (3) – 15:12 | 2–0 |
| (Johnson, Zmolek) Tyler Kirkup (12) – GW SH – 21:16 | 3–0 |
| | 3–1 | 26:37 – Sam Craggs (8) (Schneider, Parker) |
| | 3–2 | 43:26 – Sam Craggs (9) (Schneider, Wozney) |
| (L. Sillinger) Bradley Johnson (2) – EN – 57:30 | 4–2 |

12 min
Penalties
10 min
27
Shots
29

| March 6, 2022; 5:07 PM | Bemidji State | 3 – 1 (0–0, 1–0, 2–1) | Bowling Green | Sanford Center; Attendance: 1,512 |

Game reference

Mattias Sholl
Goalies
Christian Stoever
Referees:
Brian Hill
Bruce Vida
Linesmen:
Tyler Landman
Nathan Voll

| (Martin, O. Sillinger) Ethan Somoza (10) – 21:54 | 1–0 |
| | 1–1 | 26:37 – Evan Dougherty (3) (Wozney, Norris) |
| (Ierullo) Lukas Sillinger (15) – GW – 50:13 | 2–1 |
| (unassisted) Owen Sillinger (16) – EN – 59:28 | 3–1 |

6 min
Penalties
6 min
28
Shots
24

| Bemidji State Won Series 2–1 |

==== (4) Lake Superior State vs. (5) Northern Michigan ====
| March 4, 2022; 6:07 PM | Lake Superior State | 1 – 5 (0–0, 0–2, 1–3) | Northern Michigan | Taffy Abel Arena; Attendance: 1,050 |

Game reference

Seth Eisele
Goalies
Charlie Glockner
Referees:
Brady Johnson
Derek Berkebile
Linesmen:
Eric Froberg
Jamie Grace

| | 0–1 | 30:29 – Alex Frye (7) (Cosgrove, Marritt) |
| | 0–2 | 34:04 – GW – Mack Byers (4) (Frye, Marritt) |
| | 0–3 | 41:38 – Hampus Eriksson (6) (Crone, Vanderbeck) |
| | 0–4 | 47:53 – AJ Vanderbeck (23) (Eriksson) |
| | 0–5 | 54:05 – SH EN – Bo Hanson (3) (Newhouse) |
| (Boudon, Roy) Brandon Puricelli (11) – 55:51 | 1–5 |

4 min
Penalties
6 min
18
Shots
25

| March 5, 2022; 6:07 PM | Lake Superior State | 3 – 2 (1–0, 2–1, 0–1) | Northern Michigan | Taffy Abel Arena; Attendance: 1,100 |

Game reference

Ethan Langenegger
Goalies
Charlie Glockner
Referees:
Brady Johnson
Derek Berkebile
Linesmen:
Eric Froberg
Jamie Grace

| (Boudon, Bengtsson) Miroslav Mucha (10) – PP – 10:15 | 1–0 |
| | 1–1 | 29:54 – PP – Alex Frye (8) (Ghantous, Cosgrove) |
| (Boudon, Bengtsson) Brandon Puricelli (12) – 36:29 | 2–1 |
| (Willets, Jenuwine) Timo Bakos (6) – GW – 38:03 | 3–1 |
| | 3–2 | 49:14 – AJ Vanderbeck (24) (Newhouse, Crone) |

4 min
Penalties
4 min
24
Shots
29

| March 6, 2022; 6:07 PM | Lake Superior State | 4 – 5 (2–1, 1–4, 1–0) | Northern Michigan | Taffy Abel Arena; Attendance: 850 |

Game reference

Ethan Langenegger
Goalies
Charlie Glockner
Referees:
Brady Johnson
Derek Berkebile
Linesmen:
Eric Froberg
Jamie Grace

| | 0–1 | 03:52 – Alex Frye (9) (de Mey, Van Unen) |
| (Bakos, Posa) Jake Willets (6) – 08:32 | 1–1 |
| (Puricelli) Logan Jenuwine (9) – 16:39 | 2–1 |
| (Mucha, Boudon) Jacob Nordqvist (5) – 21:20 | 3–1 |
| | 3–2 | 30:36 – Mack Byers (5) (Willits) |
| | 3–3 | 32:01 – Trevor Cosgrove (9) (Vanderbeck, Eriksson) |
| | 3–4 | 37:09 – PP – Hank Crone (13) (Keefer, Vanderbeck) |
| | 3–5 | 38:36 – GW – Tanner Vescio (3) (Eriksson, Vanderbeck) |
| (Boudon, Bengtsson) Brandon Puricelli (13) – EA – 54:23 | 4–5 |

8 min
Penalties
23 min
20
Shots
33

| Northern Michigan Won Series 2–1 |

=== Semifinals ===
==== (1) Minnesota State vs. (5) Northern Michigan ====
| March 12, 2022; 6:07 PM | Minnesota State | 8 – 1 (2–0, 4–1, 2–0) | Northern Michigan | Mayo Clinic Health System Event Center; Attendance: 4,492 |

Game reference

Dryden McKay
Goalies
Charlie Glockner (out 40:00)
Nolan Kent (in 40:00)
Referees:
Shane Paskey
Bobby Lukkason
Linesmen:
Tyler Landman
Nathan Voll

| (unassisted) Connor Gregga (5) – 13:43 | 1–0 |
| (McNeely) David Silye (7) – GW – 14:06 | 2–0 |
| (Livingstone, Napravnik) Nathan Smith (18) – PP – 25:08 | 3–0 |
| | 3–1 | 29:38 – PP – Alex Frye (10) (Ghantous, Hanson) |
| (Furry, Morton) Ryan Sandelin (21) – 30:53 | 4–1 |
| (Borchardt, Napravnik) Andy Carroll (3) – 33:55 | 5–1 |
| (Gregga, Pavel) Will Hillman (1) – 34:26 | 6–1 |
| (Smith, Hirose) Julian Napravnik (18) – PP – 52:14 | 7–1 |
| (Carroll, Pavel) Wyatt Aamodt (6) – PP – 56:46 | 8–1 |

14 min
Penalties
12 min
34
Shots
21

==== (2) Michigan Tech vs. (3) Bemidji State ====
| March 12, 2022; 6:07 PM | Michigan Tech | 2 – 5 (0–0, 1–1, 1–4) | Bemidji State | MacInnes Student Ice Arena; Attendance: 2,634 |

Game reference

Blake Pietila
Goalies
Mattias Sholl
Referees:
Brady Johnson
Derek Berkebile
Linesmen:
Jamie Grace
Eric Froberg

| (Boudon, Roy) Trenton Bliss (12) – 30:05 | 1–0 |
| | 1–1 | 31:39 – Lukas Sillinger (16) (unassisted) |
| | 1–2 | 49:46 – Alex Ierullo (15) (unassisted) |
| | 1–3 | 52:51 – GW – Owen Sillinger (17) (Ierullo, Rosén) |
| | 1–4 | 54:45 – Alex Ierullo (16) (Rosén, L. Sillinger) |
| | 1–5 | 56:57 – EN – Lukas Sillinger (17) (O. Sillinger, Zmolek) |
| (Bliss) Tommy Parrottino (11) – PP – 58:51 | 2–5 |

2 min
Penalties
2 min
28
Shots
24

=== Championship ===
==== (1) Minnesota State vs. (3) Bemidji State ====
| March 19, 2022; 6:07 PM | Minnesota State | 2 – 1 (OT) (0–0, 1–1, 0–0, 0–1) | Bemidji State | Mayo Clinic Health System Event Center; Attendance: 5,126 |

Game reference

Dryden McKay
Goalies
Mattias Sholl
Referees:
Brady Johnson
Derek Berkebile
Linesmen:
Tylaer Landman
Nathan Voll

| | 0–1 | 29:17 – Alex Adams (17) (Kirkup) |
| (Livingstone, Morton) Brendan Furry (11) – PP – 37:16 | 1–1 |
| (Smith, Napravnik) Jack McNeely (2) – GW – 65:11 | 2–1 |

2 min
Penalties
6 min
32
Shots
22
