= 2021–22 Bemidji State Beavers men's ice hockey season =

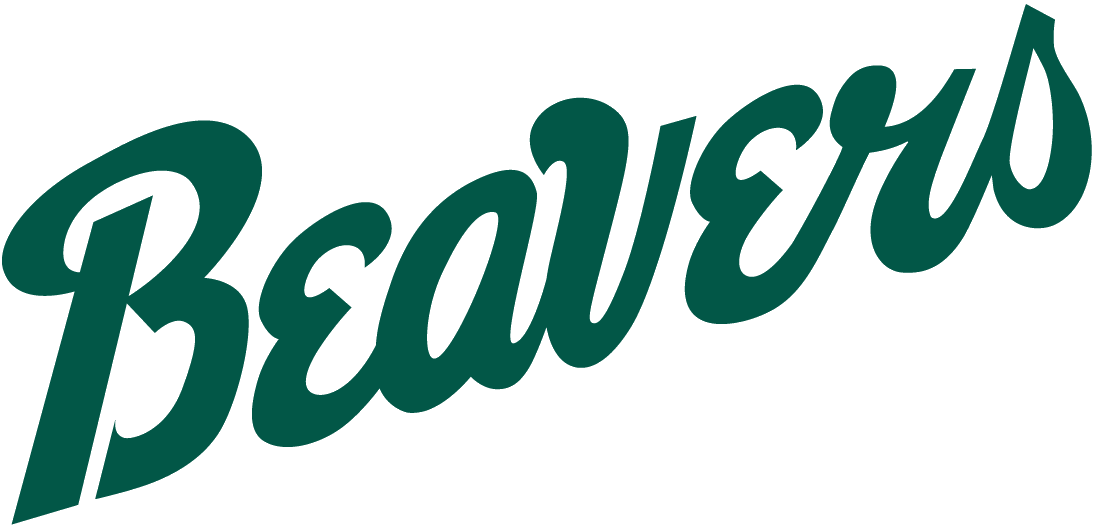
- Conference: 3rd CCHA
- Home ice: Sanford Center

Rankings
- USCHO: NR
- USA Today: NR

Record
- Overall: 19–20–0
- Conference: 14–12–0
- Home: 11–11–0
- Road: 8–9–0

Coaches and captains
- Head coach: Tom Serratore
- Assistant coaches: Travis Winter; Mike Gibbons; Michael Fanelli
- Captain: Ethan Somoza
- Alternate captain(s): Brad Johnson; Owen Sillinger

The 2021–22 Bemidji State Beavers men's ice hockey season was the 66th season of play for the program. The team represented Bemidji State University in the 2021–22 NCAA Division I men's ice hockey season and for the first season in the Central Collegiate Hockey Association (CCHA). The Beavers were coached by Tom Serratore, in his 21st season, and played their home games at Sanford Center.

== Season ==
Bemidji State joined with six other members of the WCHA to restart the CCHA for the 2021–22 season. The Beavers began the year with a difficult string of games, going 1–3 against non-conference teams that would both make the tournament. While the losses put them near the bottom of the standings, BSU was able to stay in the polls and keep their NCAA hopes alive with a sweep of Northern Michigan. The Beaves spent November hovering around 20th in the polls but a couple of losses knocked them out for good come December.

The chief problem for Bemidji State during the first half of their season was inconsistent goaltending. Tom Serratore had used all three of his netminders at times but none performed at a high level. Eventually, the team went with freshman Mattias Sholl as the primary starter but the young goalie still was getting used to the college game.

After losing four consecutive games to ranked teams in December, Bemidji State had dropped down to .500 but, because of the poor record against good teams (2–8 against eventual tournament teams), the Beavers had very little to buoy themselves in the standings. Both the offense and defense played well for a three-game stretch, however, that ended rather abruptly; BSU went 1–8 over a month-long stretch, only once score more than 2 goals (the solitary win) and surrendering 5 goals in five separate games. The losing streak made it impossible for the Beavers to make the tournament without a conference championship and put them in jeopardy of having to play on the road in the quarterfinals. The only thing that arrested their free-fall was a date with the worst team that season, St. Thomas, who was playing its first season at the Division I level.

The uninspired play to end their year did not bode well for Bemidji State in the conference tournament. Despite their play of late, the team recovered in the postseason and the defense led them to a pair of victories over Bowling Green. The conference semifinal could hardly have gone better for the Beavers as the offense finally reappeared during the third period, potting 3 goals in 5 minutes to lead them to a stunning upset of Michigan Tech.

Bemidji State was now just one win shy of making the tournament but standing in their way was the best team in the country, Minnesota State. Despite the pressure from the Mavericks, Sholl played probably his best game of the season and held MSU off of the scoresheet for the first half of the game. The Beavers took a lead halfway through the second but lost it on a power play goal just before the end of the period. After neither team was able to score in the third, Bemidji State found themselves in the improbable position of needing just one goal to continue their year. Unfortunately, just three minutes into overtime, Minnesota State scored and ended the Beaver's run. 50 minutes later, after the Mavericks had been awarded the trophy and both teams had returned to their locker rooms, the game-winning goal was called off after additional replay angles revealed that the puck had not crossed the goal-line between the pipes but instead gone under the goal cage. Bemidji State's season was given new life and, after a warm-up period for both teams, the game was resumed. Unfortunately, like a boxer on their last legs, the Beaver's comeback only lasted until the next shot. Two minutes after resuming play, the Mavericks scored their second overtime goal, this time with no controversy, and the Beavers were knocked out.

== Departures ==
Player	Position	Nationality	Cause
Zach Driscoll	Goaltender	United States	Transferred to North Dakota
Ethan Gauer	Defenseman	United States	Transferred to St. Thomas
Darby Gula	Defenseman	Canada	Left program (retired)
Nick Leitner	Defenseman	United States	Left program (retired)
Aaron Miller	Forward	United States	Graduation (signed with Jokipojat)
Tyler Vold	Defenseman	United States	Graduation (retired)

== Recruiting ==
Player	Position	Nationality	Age	Notes
Tony Follmer	Defenseman	United States	20	O'Fallon, MO
Donte Lawson	Forward	United States	20	Taconite, MN
Jakub Lewandowski	Forward	Poland	19	Toruń, POL
Alexander Lundman	Forward	Sweden	20	Norrköping, SWE
William Magnuson	Defenseman	United States	19	Chaska, MN
Mattias Sholl	Goaltender	United States	20	Hermosa Beach, CA
Jere Väisänen	Forward	Finland	21	Espoo, FIN

== Roster ==
As of September 13, 2021.

No.	Nat.	Player	Class	Pos	Height	Weight	DoB	Hometown	Previous team	NHL rights
1	(United States)	Gavin Enright	Sophomore	G	6' 2" (1.88 m)	161 lb (73 kg)	1999-08-26	Farmington, Minnesota	Green Bay Gamblers (USHL)	—
2	(United States)	Tony Follmer	Freshman	D	6' 2" (1.88 m)	187 lb (85 kg)	2000-10-26	O'Fallon, Missouri	Lincoln Stars (USHL)	—
3	(United States)	Jack Powell	Sophomore	D	5' 11" (1.8 m)	181 lb (82 kg)	1999-09-11	Alexandria, Minnesota	Aberdeen Wings (NAHL)	—
4	(United States)	Will Zmolek	Junior	D	6' 3" (1.91 m)	194 lb (88 kg)	1999-04-02	Rochester, Minnesota	Cedar Rapids RoughRiders (USHL)	—
5	(United States)	Will Magnuson	Freshman	D	5' 10" (1.78 m)	185 lb (84 kg)	2001-10-16	Chaska, Minnesota	Bismarck Bobcats (NAHL)	—
6	(Slovakia)	Sam Solenský	Junior	F	5' 10" (1.78 m)	176 lb (80 kg)	1998-08-25	Michalovce, Slovakia	Johnstown Tomahawks (NAHL)	—
7	(United States)	Kyle Looft	Junior	D	6' 3" (1.91 m)	192 lb (87 kg)	1998-06-27	Mankato, Minnesota	Cedar Rapids RoughRiders (USHL)	—
8	(United States)	Donte Lawson	Freshman	F	5' 11" (1.8 m)	165 lb (75 kg)	2000-11-03	Taconite, Minnesota	Minnesota Wilderness (NAHL)	—
9	(United States)	Ethan Somoza (C)	Senior	F	5' 11" (1.8 m)	189 lb (86 kg)	1996-05-17	Simi Valley, California	Bloomington Thunder (USHL)	—
11	(Canada)	Eric Martin	Sophomore	F	5' 10" (1.78 m)	154 lb (70 kg)	2000-06-05	Calgary, Alberta	Drumheller Dragons (AJHL)	—
12	(Canada)	Owen Sillinger (A)	Senior	F	5' 10" (1.78 m)	182 lb (83 kg)	1997-09-23	Regina, Saskatchewan	Penticton Vees (BCHL)	—
13	(United States)	Carter Jones	Junior	F	5' 9" (1.75 m)	165 lb (75 kg)	1999-05-15	Hillyard, Washington	Trail Smoke Eaters (BCHL)	—
14	(Canada)	Alex Ierullo	Senior	F	5' 9" (1.75 m)	172 lb (78 kg)	1997-07-30	Woodbridge, Ontario	Newmarket Hurricanes (OJHL)	—
15	(Canada)	Tyler Jubenvill	Senior	D	5' 11" (1.8 m)	193 lb (88 kg)	1999-11-30	Gilbert Plains, Manitoba	Cedar Rapids RoughRiders (USHL)	—
16	(Finland)	Jere Väisänen	Freshman	F	5' 10" (1.78 m)	160 lb (73 kg)	2000-07-10	Espoo, Finland	Amarillo Bulls (NAHL)	—
17	(Canada)	Ross Armour	Senior	F	6' 2" (1.88 m)	174 lb (79 kg)	1998-02-07	Trail, British Columbia	Trail Smoke Eaters (BCHL)	—
18	(United States)	Brad Johnson (A)	Senior	D	5' 9" (1.75 m)	186 lb (84 kg)	1996-01-23	Chesterfield, Missouri	Fargo Force (USHL)	—
19	(Canada)	Brad Belisle	Junior	F	6' 2" (1.88 m)	194 lb (88 kg)	1998-01-26	Thunder Bay, Ontario	Aberdeen Wings (NAHL)	—
20	(Canada)	Lukas Sillinger	Sophomore	F	5' 11" (1.8 m)	170 lb (77 kg)	2000-09-14	Regina, Saskatchewan	Penticton Vees (BCHL)	—
21	(Sweden)	Alexander Lundman	Freshman	F	6' 0" (1.83 m)	187 lb (85 kg)	2001-06-17	Norrköping, Sweden	HV71 J20 (J20 Nationell)	—
22	(United States)	Austin Jouppi	Sophomore	F	5' 8" (1.73 m)	170 lb (77 kg)	2000-04-18	Duluth, Minnesota	Bismarck Bobcats (NAHL)	—
23	(United States)	Aaron Myers	Sophomore	F	5' 11" (1.8 m)	176 lb (80 kg)	1999-09-28	Thief River Falls, Minnesota	Minnesota Wilderness (NAHL)	—
25	(United States)	Alex Adams	Senior	F	6' 1" (1.85 m)	191 lb (87 kg)	1997-12-30	Grand Rapids, Minnesota	Minot Minotauros (NAHL)	—
26	(United States)	Nick Cardelli	Senior	F	5' 10" (1.78 m)	171 lb (78 kg)	1997-06-06	Wood Dale, Illinois	Youngstown Phantoms (USHL)	—
27	(Canada)	Tyler Kirkup	Senior	F	6' 0" (1.83 m)	203 lb (92 kg)	1998-04-03	Virden, Manitoba	Virden Oil Capitals (MJHL)	—
28	(Sweden)	Elias Rosén	Junior	D	5' 10" (1.78 m)	176 lb (80 kg)	1999-01-04	Mora, Sweden	Tri-City Storm (USHL)	—
29	(Poland)	Jakub Lewandowski	Freshman	F	6' 3" (1.91 m)	201 lb (91 kg)	2001-10-25	Toruń, Poland	Vítkovice U20 (Extraliga juniorů)	—
30	(United States)	Mattias Sholl	Freshman	G	5' 10" (1.78 m)	175 lb (79 kg)	2000-09-30	Hermosa Beach, California	Youngstown Phantoms (USHL)	—
35	(United States)	Michael Carr	Junior	G	6' 0" (1.83 m)	179 lb (81 kg)	1998-06-08	Columbus, Ohio	Cornwall Colts (CCHL)	—

== Standings ==
2021–22 Central Collegiate Hockey Association Standings
	Conference record										Overall record					
	GP	W	L	T	OTW	OTL	3/SW	PTS	GF	GA	GP	W	L	T	GF	GA
#2 Minnesota State †*	26	23	3	0	2	0	0	67	115	28	44	38	6	0	178	60
#14 Michigan Tech	26	16	8	2	2	4	0	54	93	53	37	21	13	3	118	75
Bemidji State	26	14	12	0	1	1	0	42	83	81	39	19	20	0	118	121
Lake Superior State	26	13	13	0	1	1	0	39	69	64	37	18	18	1	107	104
Northern Michigan	26	12	13	1	3	0	1	35	86	99	37	20	16	1	132	136
Bowling Green	26	11	14	1	2	1	0	33	67	87	37	15	19	3	94	119
Ferris State	26	9	16	1	2	2	0	28	66	99	36	11	24	1	90	135
St. Thomas	26	3	22	1	0	4	0	14	45	112	36	3	32	1	61	168
Championship: March 19, 2022 † indicates conference regular season champion (MacNaughton Cup) * indicates conference tournament champion (Mason Cup); Rankings: USCHO.com Top 20 Poll

== Schedule and results ==
Date	Time	Opponent^{#}	Rank^{#}	Site	TV	Decision	Result	Attendance	Record
Exhibition
October 2	6:07 PM	at #8 North Dakota*	#14	Ralph Engelstad Arena • Grand Forks, North Dakota (Exhibition)			L 1–2	11,812	
Regular season
October 8	7:07 PM	#5 Minnesota Duluth*	#15	Sanford Center • Bemidji, Minnesota		Carr	L 2–4	3,436	0–1–0
October 9	7:07 PM	at #5 Minnesota Duluth*	#15	AMSOIL Arena • Duluth, Minnesota	My9	Enright	L 1–2	5,374	0–2–0
October 15	7:07 PM	#7 North Dakota*	#20	Sanford Center • Bemidji, Minnesota		Enright	L 3–4	4,242	0–3–0
October 16	6:07 PM	at #7 North Dakota*	#20	Ralph Engelstad Arena • Grand Forks, North Dakota		Carr	W 4–3 ^{OT}	11,314	1–3–0
October 22	5:37 PM	at Northern Michigan	#19	Berry Events Center • Marquette, Michigan		Sholl	W 5–4	2,684	2–3–0
October 23	5:37 PM	at Northern Michigan	#19	Berry Events Center • Marquette, Michigan		Sholl	W 4–3	2,975	3–3–0
October 29	7:07 PM	Bowling Green	#17	Sanford Center • Bemidji, Minnesota		Sholl	L 2–3	2,402	3–4–0 (0–1–0)
October 30	6:07 PM	Bowling Green	#17	Sanford Center • Bemidji, Minnesota		Enright	W 2–1	2,304	4–4–0 (1–1–0)
November 12	6:07 PM	at Lake Superior State		Taffy Abel Arena • Sault Ste. Marie, Michigan		Enright	W 4–2	1,273	5–4–0 (2–1–0)
November 13	5:07 PM	at Lake Superior State		Taffy Abel Arena • Sault Ste. Marie, Michigan		Enright	W 5–4	0	6–4–0 (3–1–0)
November 19	7:07 PM	Michigan Tech	#20	Sanford Center • Bemidji, Minnesota		Enright	L 3–4	2,278	6–5–0 (3–2–0)
November 20	6:07 PM	Michigan Tech	#20	Sanford Center • Bemidji, Minnesota		Sholl	W 4–3	2,142	7–5–0 (4–2–0)
November 24	8:00 PM	at Arizona State*	#20	Oceanside Ice Arena • Tempe, Arizona		Sholl	W 4–3	861	8–5–0
November 26	8:00 PM	at Arizona State*	#20	Oceanside Ice Arena • Tempe, Arizona		Enright	L 4–6	0	8–6–0
December 3	7:07 PM	at St. Thomas		St. Thomas Ice Arena • Mendota Heights, Minnesota		Enright	W 5–2	664	9–6–0 (5–2–0)
December 4	7:07 PM	at St. Thomas		St. Thomas Ice Arena • Mendota Heights, Minnesota		Sholl	W 6–1	567	10–6–0 (6–2–0)
December 10	7:07 PM	#1 Minnesota State		Sanford Center • Bemidji, Minnesota		Sholl	L 1–5	2,941	10–7–0 (6–3–0)
December 11	6:07 PM	#1 Minnesota State		Sanford Center • Bemidji, Minnesota		Sholl	L 1–3	3,212	10–8–0 (6–4–0)
December 31	6:07 PM	#7 St. Cloud State*		Sanford Center • Bemidji, Minnesota		Sholl	L 1–4	3,433	10–9–0
January 1	6:07 PM	at #7 St. Cloud State*		Herb Brooks National Hockey Center • St. Cloud, Minnesota	Fox9+	Enright	L 2–5	4,634	10–10–0
January 7	7:07 PM	Lake Superior State		Sanford Center • Bemidji, Minnesota		Sholl	W 5–1	2,165	11–10–0 (7–4–0)
January 8	6:07 PM	Lake Superior State		Sanford Center • Bemidji, Minnesota		Sholl	W 5–1	2,609	12–10–0 (8–4–0)
January 14	6:07 PM	at Bowling Green		Slater Family Ice Arena • Bowling Green, Ohio		Sholl	W 5–3	3,686	13–10–0 (9–4–0)
January 15	6:07 PM	at Bowling Green		Slater Family Ice Arena • Bowling Green, Ohio		Sholl	L 2–3 ^{OT}	2,465	13–11–0 (9–5–0)
January 21	7:07 PM	Ferris State		Sanford Center • Bemidji, Minnesota		Sholl	L 1–2	2,446	13–12–0 (9–6–0)
January 22	6:07 PM	Ferris State		Sanford Center • Bemidji, Minnesota		Sholl	L 2–5	2,681	13–13–0 (9–7–0)
January 28	6:07 PM	at #18 Michigan Tech		MacInnes Student Ice Arena • Houghton, Michigan		Sholl	L 2–5	2,043	13–14–0 (9–8–0)
January 29	5:07 PM	at #18 Michigan Tech		MacInnes Student Ice Arena • Houghton, Michigan		Sholl	L 2–5	2,333	13–15–0 (9–9–0)
February 4	7:07 PM	Northern Michigan		Sanford Center • Bemidji, Minnesota		Sholl	L 1–2	2,557	13–16–0 (9–10–0)
February 5	6:07 PM	Northern Michigan		Sanford Center • Bemidji, Minnesota		Enright	W 5–3	2,120	14–16–0 (10–10–0)
February 18	7:07 PM	at #1 Minnesota State		Mayo Clinic Health System Event Center • Mankato, Minnesota	CCMk–14	Enright	L 1–5	5,058	14–17–0 (10–11–0)
February 19	6:07 PM	at #1 Minnesota State		Mayo Clinic Health System Event Center • Mankato, Minnesota	CCMk–14	Sholl	L 1–5	5,130	14–18–0 (10–12–0)
February 25	7:07 PM	St. Thomas		Sanford Center • Bemidji, Minnesota		Sholl	W 5–3	2,275	15–18–0 (11–12–0)
February 26	6:07 PM	St. Thomas		Sanford Center • Bemidji, Minnesota		Sholl	W 4–3 ^{OT}	2,112	16–18–0 (12–12–0)
CCHA Tournament
March 4	7:07 PM	Bowling Green*		Sanford Center • Bemidji, Minnesota (Quarterfinal game 1)		Sholl	L 1–2	1,422	16–19–0
March 5	6:07 PM	Bowling Green*		Sanford Center • Bemidji, Minnesota (Quarterfinal game 2)		Sholl	W 4–2	1,601	17–19–0
March 6	5:07 PM	Bowling Green*		Sanford Center • Bemidji, Minnesota (Quarterfinal game 3)		Sholl	W 3–1	1,512	18–19–0
Bemidji State Won Series 2–1
March 12	5:07 PM	at #13 Michigan Tech*		MacInnes Student Ice Arena • Houghton, MI (Semifinal)		Sholl	W 5–2	2,634	19–19–0
March 19	6:07 PM	at #1 Minnesota State*		Mayo Clinic Health System Event Center • Mankato, Minnesota (Championship)		Sholl	L 1–2 ^{OT}	5,126	19–20–0
*Non-conference game. ^{#}Rankings from USCHO.com Poll. All times are in Central Time. Source:

== Scoring statistics ==
Name	Position	Games	Goals	Assists	Points	PIM
Owen Sillinger	C	39	17	30	47	41
Alex Ierullo	LW	39	16	26	42	28
Lukas Sillinger	F	37	17	21	38	54
Elias Rosén	D	38	7	19	26	18
Ethan Somoza	LW	38	10	12	22	8
Eric Martin	F	39	3	16	19	8
Tyler Kirkup	C/LW	39	12	6	18	39
Ross Armour	F	34	8	8	16	18
Will Zmolek	D	38	5	10	15	26
Jere Väisänen	F	37	6	2	8	8
Alex Adams	F	36	4	4	8	6
Kyle Looft	D	39	3	5	8	46
Bradley Johnson	D	39	2	6	8	53
Aaron Myers	F	21	1	4	5	2
William Magnuson	D	34	0	5	5	4
Sam Solenský	C/RW	29	3	1	4	6
Jakub Lewandowski	F	18	2	2	4	6
Austin Jouppi	F	25	1	2	3	8
Tyler Jubenvill	D	39	1	2	3	31
Donte Lawson	F	6	0	1	1	0
Carter Jones	F	15	0	1	1	0
Mattias Sholl	G	26	0	0	0	0
Jack Powell	D	3	0	0	0	0
Mike Carr	G	4	0	0	0	0
Alexander Lundman	LW/RW	12	0	0	0	2
Gavin Enright	G	13	0	0	0	0
Nicholas Cardelli	RW	14	0	0	0	10
Tony Follmer	D	26	0	0	0	4
Bench	-	-	-	-	-	4
Total			118	184	302	428

== Goaltending statistics ==
Name	Games	Minutes	Wins	Losses	Ties	Goals against	Saves	Shut outs	SV %	GAA
Mattias Sholl	26	1463	13	13	0	67	629	0	.904	2.75
Gavin Enright	14	712	5	6	0	40	320	0	.889	3.37
Mike Carr	4	149	1	1	0	10	66	0	.868	4.01
Empty Net	-	23	-	-	-	4	-	-	-	-
Total	39	2348	19	20	0	121	1015	0	.893	3.09

== Rankings ==
Poll	Week																									
Poll	Pre	1	2	3	4	5	6	7	8	9	10	11	12	13	14	15	16	17	18	19	20	21	22	23	24	25 (Final)
USCHO.com	14	15	20	19	17	20	NR	20	20	NR	NR	NR	NR	NR	NR	NR	NR	NR	NR	NR	NR	NR	NR	NR	-	NR
USA Today	15	NR	NR	NR	NR	NR	NR	NR	NR	NR	NR	NR	NR	NR	NR	NR	NR	NR	NR	NR	NR	NR	NR	NR	NR	NR

Note: USCHO did not release a poll in week 24.

== Awards and honors ==
Player	Award	Ref
Elias Rosén	CCHA First Team	
Owen Sillinger	CCHA Second Team	
Mattias Sholl	CCHA Rookie Team	
