= 2021–22 Northern Michigan Wildcats men's ice hockey season =

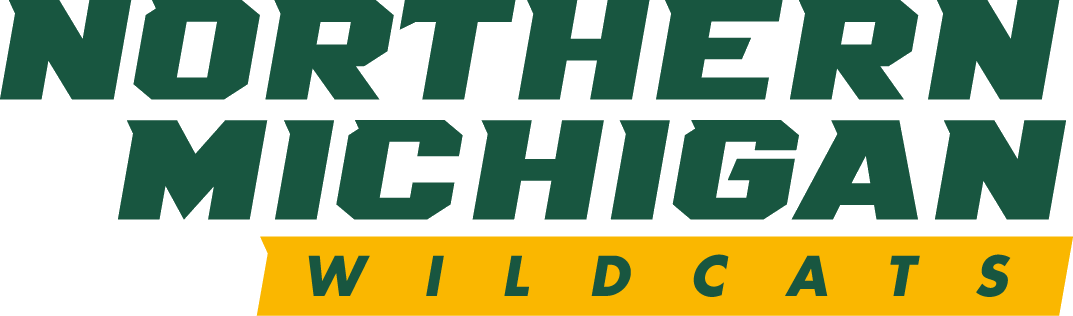
- Conference: 5th CCHA
- Home ice: Berry Events Center

Rankings
- USCHO: NR
- USA Today: NR

Record
- Overall: 20–16–1
- Conference: 12–13–1
- Home: 12–6–1
- Road: 8–10–0

Coaches and captains
- Head coach: Grant Potulny
- Assistant coaches: Byron Pool; Rob Lehtinen
- Captain: Joseph Nardi
- Alternate captain: Ben Newhouse

The 2021–22 Northern Michigan Wildcats men's ice hockey season was the 46th season of play for the program and the 24th season in the CCHA conference. The Wildcats represented Northern Michigan University and were coached by Grant Potulny, in his 5th season.

== Season ==
Northern Michigan joined with six other members of the WCHA to restart the CCHA for the 2021–22 season. They opened their season with a weekend sweep but then ran into trouble with a 5-game losing skid. While the offense was able to produce, the Wildcats did not receive adequate goaltending from Rico DiMatteo. Come November, however, the results began to improve and Northern Michigan rose a high-octane offense to a winning record. The team's attack was led by Hank Crone and A. J. Vanderbeck, both of whom would finish among the national scoring leaders. The best performance on the season came in early December when NMU took on then-#1 Minnesota Duluth and swept both games. While the Bulldogs were forced to use their third string goalie due to illness and injury, putting up 5 goals in both games against one of the nation's top defenses was still impressive. The victories also garnered Northern Michigan with their first ranking of the season and set the team up as a possible surprise for the NCAA Tournament. Unfortunately, the Wildcats ended the first half of their year getting swept by Lake Superior State and immediately dropping out of the polls.

The second half of the season began well for the Wildcats and when the team split a weekend with Minnesota State they reentered the top-20. After a week off, the team was again stymied by the Lakers and kicked out of the rankings. More importantly, however, was that DiMatteo's play in net had become so inconsistent that the team turned to freshman Charlie Glockner. The new starter immediately provided a boost in goal and the team tried to make a bid for a home site in the postseason, but their 1–3 record versus Lake Superior ultimately left them in the 5th position.

The Wildcats had to travel to Sault Ste. Marie to take on their long-time rival but their powerful offense, which had carried them to victory so often during the season, gave Northern Michigan the edge. After splitting the first two games, NMU found itself down 1–3 mid-way through the deciding game but then went on a rampage in the Lakers' zone. In exactly 8 minutes of game time, Northern Michigan scored four goals and took a commanding 5–3 lead. Glockner was able to hold off Lake Superior for most of the third and give the Wildcats a date in the conference semifinal. There they found Minnesota State waiting for them but the Mavericks were looking for revenge. NMU had downed Minnesota State in the semis the year before and MSU was going to make sure there was no repeat. Northern Michigan was completely swamped, getting outshot 21–34 and outscored 1–8. While the end of their season wasn't pretty, the team had been able to provide some stunning highlights during the year.

== Departures ==
Player	Position	Nationality	Cause
Noah Ganske	Defenseman	United States	Transferred to Wisconsin–River Falls
John Hawthorne	Goaltender	United States	Transferred to Canisius
Grant Johnson	Forward	United States	Left program (retired)
Griffin Loughran	Forward	United States	Transferred to Michigan State
James Miller	Defenseman	United States	Left program (retired)
Mason Palmer	Defenseman	United States	Transferred to Augsburg
Ty Readman	Forward	Canada	Transferred to Wisconsin–Eau Claire
John Roberts	Goaltender	United States	Transferred to St. Norbert
Connor Ryckman	Goaltender	Canada	Graduation (retired)
Brandon Schultz	Forward	United States	Graduation (signed with Toledo Walleye)
Hank Sorensen	Defenseman	United States	Signed professional contract (South Carolina Stingrays)

== Recruiting ==
Player	Position	Nationality	Age	Notes
Trevor Cosgrove	Defenseman	United States	24	Exeter, NH; graduate transfer from Colgate
Hank Crone	Forward	United States	23	Dallas, TX; transfer from Denver
Hampus Eriksson	Forward	Sweden	25	Gävle, SWE; graduate transfer from Lake Superior State
Reilly Funk	Forward	Canada	20	Portage, MB
Charlie Glockner	Goaltender	United States	21	Minnetonka, MN
Oscar Geschwind	Forward	Sweden	20	Karlstad, SWE
Bo Hanson	Defenseman	United States	23	Boise, ID; graduate transfer from Denver
Jakob Peterson	Forward	United States	19	Marquette, MI; joined mid-season

== Roster ==
As of September 6, 2021.

No.	Nat.	Player	Class	Pos	Height	Weight	DoB	Hometown	Previous team	NHL rights
1	(Canada)	Nolan Kent	Senior	G	6' 0" (1.83 m)	196 lb (89 kg)	1998-08-12	Chestermere, Alberta	Spruce Grove Saints (AJHL)	—
2	(United States)	Trevor Cosgrove	Graduate	D	6' 0" (1.83 m)	195 lb (88 kg)	1997-06-04	Exeter, New Hampshire	Colgate (ECAC)	—
3	(United States)	Colby Enns	Junior	D	6' 2" (1.88 m)	201 lb (91 kg)	1999-09-16	Minot, North Dakota	Lincoln Stars (USHL)	—
4	(Canada)	Michael Van Unen	Junior	D	6' 1" (1.85 m)	190 lb (86 kg)	1999-02-26	Kamloops, British Columbia	Merritt Centennials (BCHL)	—
6	(Canada)	Tyrell Boucher	Sophomore	D	6' 1" (1.85 m)	185 lb (84 kg)	1999-06-03	Grande Prairie, Alberta	Cowichan Valley Capitals (BCHL)	—
7	(United States)	David Keefer	Senior (RS)	F	5' 10" (1.78 m)	195 lb (88 kg)	1997-10-21	Brighton, Michigan	Michigan State (Big Ten)	—
8	(United States)	Tim Erkkila	Sophomore	D	6' 1" (1.85 m)	185 lb (84 kg)	2000-11-16	Brighton, Michigan	Fairbanks Ice Dogs (NAHL)	—
9	(Canada)	Ian Malcolmson	Sophomore	F	5' 10" (1.78 m)	165 lb (75 kg)	1999-01-29	Waukesha, Wisconsin	Sioux Falls Stampede (USHL)	—
10	(United States)	Ben Newhouse (A)	Graduate	D	5' 8" (1.73 m)	174 lb (79 kg)	1997-06-16	Edina, Minnesota	Union (ECAC)	—
11	(United States)	André Ghantous	Junior	F	5' 9" (1.75 m)	170 lb (77 kg)	1998-12-07	Glendale, California	Penticton Vees (BCHL)	—
12	(Canada)	Connor Marritt	Sophomore	F	6' 1" (1.85 m)	174 lb (79 kg)	1999-03-14	Kelowna, British Columbia	Vernon Vipers (BCHL)	—
13	(United States)	Mikey Colella	Sophomore	F	5' 7" (1.7 m)	155 lb (70 kg)	1999-06-12	Wenonah, New Jersey	Trail Smoke Eaters (BCHL)	—
14	(United States)	Vincent de Mey	Senior	F	6' 1" (1.85 m)	185 lb (84 kg)	1997-11-26	Los Angeles, California	Muskegon Lumberjacks (USHL)	—
15	(Canada)	Rylan Van Unen	Sophomore	F	6' 1" (1.85 m)	190 lb (86 kg)	1999-02-26	Kamloops, British Columbia	Merritt Centennials (BCHL)	—
16	(United States)	Hank Crone	Junior	F	5' 9" (1.75 m)	151 lb (68 kg)	1998-02-19	Dallas, Texas	Denver (NCHC)	—
17	(Sweden)	Oscar Geschwind	Freshman	F	6' 0" (1.83 m)	190 lb (86 kg)	2001-02-24	Karlstad, Sweden	Örebro J20 (J20 Nationell)	—
18	(Canada)	Joseph Nardi (C)	Graduate	F	5' 10" (1.78 m)	178 lb (81 kg)	1997-06-01	Edmonton, Alberta	Whitecourt Wolverines (AJHL)	—
19	(United States)	A. J. Vanderbeck	Junior	F	5' 11" (1.8 m)	185 lb (84 kg)	1997-09-23	Monument, Colorado	Ohio State (Big Ten)	—
20	(United States)	Garrett Klee	Senior	F	6' 1" (1.85 m)	190 lb (86 kg)	1998-04-11	Morrison, Colorado	Waterloo Black Hawks (USHL)	—
21	(United States)	Bo Hanson	Graduate	D	6' 2" (1.88 m)	205 lb (93 kg)	1997-11-13	Boise, Idaho	Denver (NCHC)	—
22	(United States)	Jett Jungels	Sophomore (RS)	F	5' 8" (1.73 m)	165 lb (75 kg)	2000-07-14	Edina, Minnesota	Edina High School (USHS–MN)	—
24	(Sweden)	Hampus Eriksson	Graduate	F	6' 6" (1.98 m)	211 lb (96 kg)	1996-09-11	Forsbacka, Sweden	Lake Superior State (WCHA)	—
25	(Canada)	Brett Willits	Sophomore	F	5' 10" (1.78 m)	174 lb (79 kg)	1999-03-16	London, Ontario	Chilliwack Chiefs (BCHL)	—
26	(United States)	Tanner Vescio	Junior	D	6' 2" (1.88 m)	195 lb (88 kg)	1998-04-14	Blaine, Minnesota	Fargo Force (USHL)	—
27	(United States)	Mack Byers	Sophomore	F	5' 11" (1.8 m)	172 lb (78 kg)	1999-02-08	Long Lake, Minnesota	Aberdeen Wings (NAHL)	—
28	(United States)	Alex Frye	Junior	F	5' 11" (1.8 m)	175 lb (79 kg)	1998-07-27	Clarkston, Michigan	Alaska Anchorage (WCHA)	—
29	(Canada)	Reilly Funk	Freshman	F	6' 3" (1.91 m)	194 lb (88 kg)	2000-12-23	Portage, Manitoba	Youngstown Phantoms (USHL)	—
31	(United States)	Charlie Glockner	Freshman	G	6' 3" (1.91 m)	181 lb (82 kg)	2000-06-27	Minnetonka, Minnesota	Waterloo Black Hawks (USHL)	—
33	(United States)	Rico DiMatteo	Sophomore	G	6' 3" (1.91 m)	161 lb (73 kg)	2001-01-01	Brasher Falls, New York	Lone Star Brahmas (NAHL)	—
	(United States)	Jakob Peterson	Freshman	D	6' 3" (1.91 m)	172 lb (78 kg)	2002-04-18	Marquette, MI	Amarillo Wranglers (NAHL)	—

== Standings ==
2021–22 Central Collegiate Hockey Association Standings
	Conference record										Overall record					
	GP	W	L	T	OTW	OTL	3/SW	PTS	GF	GA	GP	W	L	T	GF	GA
#2 Minnesota State †*	26	23	3	0	2	0	0	67	115	28	44	38	6	0	178	60
#14 Michigan Tech	26	16	8	2	2	4	0	54	93	53	37	21	13	3	118	75
Bemidji State	26	14	12	0	1	1	0	42	83	81	39	19	20	0	118	121
Lake Superior State	26	13	13	0	1	1	0	39	69	64	37	18	18	1	107	104
Northern Michigan	26	12	13	1	3	0	1	35	86	99	37	20	16	1	132	136
Bowling Green	26	11	14	1	2	1	0	33	67	87	37	15	19	3	94	119
Ferris State	26	9	16	1	2	2	0	28	66	99	36	11	24	1	90	135
St. Thomas	26	3	22	1	0	4	0	14	45	112	36	3	32	1	61	168
Championship: March 19, 2022 † indicates conference regular season champion (MacNaughton Cup) * indicates conference tournament champion (Mason Cup); Rankings: USCHO.com Top 20 Poll

== Schedule and results ==
Date	Time	Opponent^{#}	Rank^{#}	Site	TV	Decision	Result	Attendance	Record
Exhibition
October 2	3:04 PM	at Michigan Tech*		MacInnes Student Ice Arena • Houghton, Michigan (Exhibition)			T 4–4		
Regular season
October 8	6:37 PM	St. Thomas		Berry Events Center • Marquette, Michigan		DiMatteo	W 4–1	2,532	1–0–0 (1–0–0)
October 9	6:37 PM	St. Thomas		Berry Events Center • Marquette, Michigan		DiMatteo	W 8–3	3,080	2–0–0 (2–0–0)
October 15	6:37 PM	USNTDP*		Berry Events Center • Marquette, Michigan (Exhibition)			L 3–5		
October 16	6:37 PM	#17 Notre Dame*		Berry Events Center • Marquette, Michigan		DiMatteo	L 2–5	3,754	2–1–0
October 22	6:37 PM	#19 Bemidji State		Berry Events Center • Marquette, Michigan		Kent	L 4–5	2,684	2–2–0 (2–1–0)
October 23	6:37 PM	#19 Bemidji State		Berry Events Center • Marquette, Michigan		DiMatteo	L 3–4	2,975	2–3–0 (2–2–0)
October 29	8:07 PM	at #3 Minnesota State		Mayo Clinic Health System Event Center • Mankato, Minnesota		DiMatteo	L 2–4	3,952	2–4–0 (2–3–0)
October 30	7:07 PM	at #3 Minnesota State		Mayo Clinic Health System Event Center • Mankato, Minnesota		DiMatteo	L 0–7	4,004	2–5–0 (2–4–0)
November 5	6:37 PM	Boston University*		Berry Events Center • Marquette, Michigan		DiMatteo	W 5–3	3,650	3–5–0
November 6	6:37 PM	Boston University*		Berry Events Center • Marquette, Michigan		DiMatteo	W 6–2	3,219	4–5–0
November 12	7:07 PM	at Michigan Tech		MacInnes Student Ice Arena • Houghton, Michigan (Rivalry)	Fox UP	DiMatteo	L 2–5	4,460	4–6–0 (2–5–0)
November 13	6:37 PM	Michigan Tech		Berry Events Center • Marquette, Michigan (Rivalry)	Fox UP	DiMatteo	W 3–2 ^{OT}	3,847	5–6–0 (3–5–0)
November 19	7:07 PM	at Ferris State		Ewigleben Arena • Big Rapids, Michigan		DiMatteo	W 6–3	1,097	6–6–0 (4–5–0)
November 20	6:07 PM	at Ferris State		Ewigleben Arena • Big Rapids, Michigan		DiMatteo	W 7–6 ^{OT}	1,589	7–6–0 (5–5–0)
November 26	6:37 PM	Bowling Green		Berry Events Center • Marquette, Michigan		DiMatteo	W 6–3	2,053	8–6–0 (6–5–0)
November 27	6:37 PM	Bowling Green		Berry Events Center • Marquette, Michigan		DiMatteo	T 3–3 ^{SOW}	2,107	8–6–1 (6–5–1)
December 3	6:37 PM	#1 Minnesota Duluth*		Berry Events Center • Marquette, Michigan		DiMatteo	W 5–4	2,960	9–6–1
December 4	6:37 PM	#1 Minnesota Duluth*		Berry Events Center • Marquette, Michigan		DiMatteo	W 5–2	3,414	10–6–1
December 10	7:07 PM	at Lake Superior State	#19	Taffy Abel Arena • Sault Ste. Marie, Michigan		DiMatteo	L 2–7	500	10–7–1 (6–6–1)
December 11	6:07 PM	at Lake Superior State	#19	Taffy Abel Arena • Sault Ste. Marie, Michigan		DiMatteo	L 1–4	790	10–8–1 (6–7–1)
January 7	6:37 PM	Colgate*		Berry Events Center • Marquette, Michigan		DiMatteo	W 4–2	1,832	11–8–1
January 8	6:37 PM	Colgate*		Berry Events Center • Marquette, Michigan		DiMatteo	W 6–3	2,227	12–8–1
January 14	6:37 PM	#1 Minnesota State		Berry Events Center • Marquette, Michigan		DiMatteo	W 4–2	2,284	13–8–1 (7–7–1)
January 15	6:37 PM	#1 Minnesota State		Berry Events Center • Marquette, Michigan		Glockner	L 1–4	2,897	13–9–1 (7–8–1)
January 28	7:07 PM	Lake Superior State	#20	Berry Events Center • Marquette, Michigan		DiMatteo	L 1–6	2,288	13–10–1 (7–9–1)
January 29	6:07 PM	Lake Superior State	#20	Berry Events Center • Marquette, Michigan		Glockner	W 2–1	2,564	14–10–1 (8–9–1)
February 1	6:07 PM	at #15 Michigan Tech		MacInnes Student Ice Arena • Houghton, Michigan (Rivalry)	Fox UP	Glockner	L 1–5	2,744	14–11–1 (8–10–1)
February 4	8:07 PM	at Bemidji State		Sanford Center • Bemidji, Minnesota		Glockner	W 2–1	2,557	15–11–1 (9–10–1)
February 5	7:07 PM	at Bemidji State		Sanford Center • Bemidji, Minnesota		Kent	L 3–5	2,120	15–12–1 (9–11–1)
February 8	6:37 PM	#14 Michigan Tech		Berry Events Center • Marquette, Michigan (Rivalry)	Fox UP	Kent	L 1–8	3,964	15–13–1 (9–12–1)
February 18	7:07 PM	at Bowling Green		Slater Family Ice Arena • Bowling Green, Ohio		Glockner	W 6–3	2,611	16–13–1 (10–12–1)
February 19	7:07 PM	at Bowling Green		Slater Family Ice Arena • Bowling Green, Ohio		Glockner	W 4–2	3,734	17–13–1 (11–12–1)
February 25	6:37 PM	Ferris State		Berry Events Center • Marquette, Michigan		Glockner	W 7–1	2,114	18–13–1 (12–12–1)
February 26	6:37 PM	Ferris State		Berry Events Center • Marquette, Michigan		Glockner	L 2–4	2,556	18–14–1 (12–13–1)
CCHA Tournament
March 4	6:07 PM	at Lake Superior State*		Taffy Abel Arena • Sault Ste. Marie, Michigan (Quarterfinal game 1)		Glockner	W 5–1	1,050	19–14–1
March 5	6:07 PM	at Lake Superior State*		Taffy Abel Arena • Sault Ste. Marie, Michigan (Quarterfinal game 2)		Glockner	L 2–3	1,100	19–15–1
March 6	6:07 PM	at Lake Superior State*		Taffy Abel Arena • Sault Ste. Marie, Michigan (Quarterfinal game 3)		Glockner	W 5–4	850	20–15–1
Northern Michigan Won Series 2–1
March 12	5:07 PM	at #1 Minnesota State*		Mayo Clinic Health System Event Center • Mankato, Minnesota (Semifinal)		Glockner	L 1–8	4,492	20–16–1
*Non-conference game. ^{#}Rankings from USCHO.com Poll. All times are in Eastern Time. Source:

== Scoring statistics ==
Name	Position	Games	Goals	Assists	Points	PIM
Hank Crone	LW	32	13	31	44	22
A. J. Vanderbeck	F	36	24	19	43	18
André Ghantous	RW	37	10	26	36	57
Trevor Cosgrove	D	37	9	19	28	26
Mikey Colella	F	37	15	12	27	10
Ben Newhouse	D	37	5	22	27	4
David Keefer	RW	36	10	12	22	18
Hampus Eriksson	C/W	33	6	16	22	18
Alex Frye	C	33	10	6	16	31
Vincent De Mey	F	35	6	10	16	12
Joseph Nardi	LW	21	3	11	14	2
Bo Hanson	D	36	3	10	13	29
Mack Byers	LW	26	5	1	6	17
Rylan Van Unen	F	18	4	1	5	31
Oscar Geschwind	C	15	2	3	5	2
Garrett Klee	F	33	1	4	5	16
Tanner Vescio	D	35	3	1	4	26
Connor Marritt	F	29	1	3	4	8
Mike Van Unen	D	32	1	2	3	49
Brett Willits	C	12	0	3	3	0
Tim Erkkila	D	19	0	3	3	4
Rico DiMatteo	G	22	0	2	2	2
Jett Jungels	F	25	0	2	2	17
Tyrell Boucher	D	13	0	1	1	2
Reilly Funk	C	1	0	0	0	0
Colby Enns	D	2	0	0	0	0
Nolan Kent	G	6	0	0	0	0
Ian Malcolmson	F	7	0	0	0	0
Jakob Peterson	D	8	0	0	0	2
Charlie Glockner	G	17	0	0	0	0
Total			131	221	352	423

== Goaltending statistics ==
Name	Games	Minutes	Wins	Losses	Ties	Goals against	Saves	Shut outs	SV %	GAA
Charlie Glockner	18	862	7	5	0	45	388	0	.896	3.13
Rico DiMatteo	22	1172	13	8	1	68	536	0	.887	3.48
Nolan Kent	6	179	0	3	0	17	64	0	.790	5.68
Empty Net	-	17	-	-	-	4	-	-	-	-
Total	37	2230	20	16	1	136	988	0	.879	3.66

== Rankings ==
Poll	Week																									
Poll	Pre	1	2	3	4	5	6	7	8	9	10	11	12	13	14	15	16	17	18	19	20	21	22	23	24	25 (Final)
USCHO.com	NR	NR	NR	NR	NR	NR	NR	NR	NR	NR	19	NR	NR	NR	19	20	NR	NR	NR	NR	NR	NR	NR	NR	-	NR
USA Today	NR	NR	NR	NR	NR	NR	NR	NR	NR	NR	NR	NR	NR	NR	NR	NR	NR	NR	NR	NR	NR	NR	NR	NR	NR	NR

Note: USCHO did not release a poll in week 24.

== Awards and honors ==
Player	Award	Ref
AJ Vanderbeck	CCHA Second Team	
Charlie Glockner	CCHA Rookie Team	
