= 2021–22 Ferris State Bulldogs men's ice hockey season =

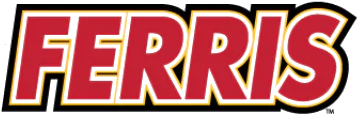
- Conference: 7th CCHA
- Home ice: Ewigleben Arena

Rankings
- USCHO: NR
- USA Today: NR

Record
- Overall: 11–24–1
- Conference: 9–16–1
- Home: 5–9–1
- Road: 6–15–0

Coaches and captains
- Head coach: Bob Daniels
- Assistant coaches: Drew Famulak; Mark Kaufman; Kyle Schempp
- Captain(s): Liam MacDougall; Ethan Stewart
- Alternate captain(s): Justin Michaelian; Jake Transit

The 2021–22 Ferris State Bulldogs men's ice hockey season was the 47th season of play for the program and the 36th season in the Central Collegiate Hockey Association (CCHA). The team represented Ferris State University, was coached by Bob Daniels in his 30th season and played their home games at Ewigleben Arena.

== Season ==
Ferris State joined with six other members of the WCHA to restart the CCHA for the 2021–22 season. Ferris State was eager to leave the previous season behind after posting one of the worst records in the history of college hockey. Straight away, the team's offense looked much better, scoring four goals in each of their first two games and equaling their win total from the previous season after just the first weekend.

While the Bulldogs put up several more wins over the succeeding month, including over #2 Minnesota State, the team was being let down by subpar goaltending. After going through an 8-game losing skid in November, where they surrendered at least 5 goals against on 5 occasions, head coach Bob Daniels knew something had to be done. He was able to lure Noah Giesbrecht from Windsor after the fall semester and the team began to respond to the new netminder. Giesbrecht put together a solid stretch and helped the Bulldogs produce their only weekend sweep of the season, downing Bemidji State in late-January. Giesbrecht would end up sharing the goal with senior Logan Stein by the end of the season and Ferris State ended the year with 11 wins, 10 more than they had all of the previous year.

The Bulldogs' goaltenders shone in the postseason, turning aside a barrage of shots from Michigan Tech in both games. While the team managed to push the Huskies into overtime twice, they weren't able to get the final goal on either occasion.

== Departures ==
Player	Position	Nationality	Cause
Lucas Finner	Forward	United States	Graduation (retired)
Max Finner	Defenseman	United States	Left program (retired)
Coale Norris	Forward	United States	Graduate transfer to Bowling Green
Justin Smith	Defenseman	United States	Left program (retired)
Hunter Wendt	Forward	United States	Transferred to Adrian
Jake Willets	Defenseman	United States	Transferred to Lake Superior State

== Recruiting ==
Player	Position	Nationality	Age	Notes
Nico DeVita	Defenseman	United States	20	Bellevue, WA
Kaleb Ergang	Forward	Canada	20	Spruce Grove, AB
Zach Faremouth	Forward	United States	21	Jackson, MI
Noah Giesbrecht	Goaltender	Canada	22	South Surrey, BC; mid-season transfer from Windsor
Nick Grimaldi	Forward	United States	22	Plymouth, MI
Bradley Marek	Forward	United States	20	Big Rapids, MI
Brendon Michaelian	Defenseman	United States	23	Wixom, MI; transfer from Robert Morris
Nick Nardecchia	Forward	United States	20	Macomb, MI

== Roster ==
As of January 10, 2022.

No.	Nat.	Player	Class	Pos	Height	Weight	DoB	Hometown	Previous team	NHL rights
1	(United States)	Logan Stein	Sophomore	G	6' 2" (1.88 m)	201 lb (91 kg)	2001-04-26	Suwanee, Georgia	Waterloo Black Hawks (USHL)	—
2	(United States)	Brendon Michaelian	Senior	D	6' 0" (1.83 m)	178 lb (81 kg)	1997-12-07	Wixom, Michigan	Robert Morris (AHA)	—
3	(United States)	Ben Schultheis	Sophomore	D	6' 3" (1.91 m)	204 lb (93 kg)	2000-02-17	Mount Juliet, Tennessee	Dubuque Fighting Saints (USHL)	—
4	(United States)	Drew Cooper	Sophomore	D	6' 1" (1.85 m)	191 lb (87 kg)	2000-08-28	Ann Arbor, Michigan	Coquitlam Express (BCHL)	—
5	(United States)	Nico DeVita	Freshman	D	6' 2" (1.88 m)	202 lb (92 kg)	2001-05-24	Bellevue, Washington	Aberdeen Wings (NAHL)	—
6	(United States)	Blake Evennou	Junior	D	5' 10" (1.78 m)	185 lb (84 kg)	1998-07-09	Macomb, Michigan	Lone Star Brahmas (WCHA)	—
7	(United States)	Connor Fedorek	Junior	D	6' 0" (1.83 m)	193 lb (88 kg)	1999-03-27	Bethel Park, Pennsylvania	Odessa Jackalopes (CCHL)	—
8	(United States)	Austin McCarthy	Sophomore	F	6' 0" (1.83 m)	195 lb (88 kg)	1999-03-01	Ludington, Michigan	Topeka Pilots (NAHL)	—
9	(United States)	Nick Nardecchia	Freshman	F	5' 10" (1.78 m)	176 lb (80 kg)	2001-01-01	Macomb, Michigan	Lincoln Stars (USHL)	—
10	(United States)	Bradley Marek	Freshman	F	6' 3" (1.91 m)	212 lb (96 kg)	2000-11-13	Big Rapids, Michigan	Muskegon Lumberjacks (USHL)	—
11	(United States)	Jacob Dirks	Sophomore	F	6' 1" (1.85 m)	188 lb (85 kg)	1999-09-15	Mindoro, Wisconsin	Chippewa Steel (NAHL)	—
12	(United States)	Dallas Tulik	Junior	F	6' 0" (1.83 m)	189 lb (86 kg)	1998-06-23	Kalamazoo, Michigan	Dubuque Fighting Saints (USHL)	—
13	(Canada)	Mitch Deelstra	Sophomore	F	6' 0" (1.83 m)	191 lb (87 kg)	1999-07-15	Wallace, Ontario	Alberni Valley Bulldogs (BCHL)	—
15	(United States)	Jake Transit (A)	Senior	F	5' 10" (1.78 m)	179 lb (81 kg)	1999-02-26	Royal Oak, Michigan	Dubuque Fighting Saints (USHL)	—
16	(United States)	Justin Michaelian (A)	Senior	F	6' 0" (1.83 m)	191 lb (87 kg)	1997-12-07	Wixom, Michigan	Victoria Grizzlies (BCHL)	—
17	(United States)	Marshall Moise	Senior	F	6' 2" (1.88 m)	212 lb (96 kg)	1997-10-11	St. Clair Shores, Michigan	Youngstown Phantoms (USHL)	—
18	(Canada)	Kaleb Ergang	Freshman	F	5' 10" (1.78 m)	166 lb (75 kg)	2000-12-31	Spruce Grove, Alberta	Whitecourt Wolverines (AJHL)	—
19	(Czech Republic)	Štěpán Pokorný	Sophomore	F	6' 0" (1.83 m)	190 lb (86 kg)	2000-06-08	Kolín, Czech Republic	Madison Capitols (USHL)	—
20	(Canada)	Liam MacDougall (C)	Senior	F	6' 0" (1.83 m)	191 lb (87 kg)	1997-12-18	Windsor, Ontario	LaSalle Vipers (GOJHL)	—
21	(United States)	Jason Brancheau	Junior	F	5' 8" (1.73 m)	170 lb (77 kg)	1999-08-15	Ecorse, Michigan	Amarillo Bulls (NAHL)	—
22	(United States)	Luke Farthing	Sophomore	D	5' 10" (1.78 m)	183 lb (83 kg)	1999-04-21	Stoutsville, Ohio	Chippewa Steel (NAHL)	—
23	(United States)	Antonio Venuto	Sophomore	F	6' 3" (1.91 m)	204 lb (93 kg)	2000-02-26	Whitmore Lake, Michigan	Dubuque Fighting Saints (USHL)	—
24	(United States)	Brenden MacLaren	Junior	F	5' 11" (1.8 m)	196 lb (89 kg)	1998-11-30	Sault Ste. Marie, Michigan	Fairbanks Ice Dogs (NAHL)	—
25	(United States)	Zach Faremouth	Freshman	F	6' 3" (1.91 m)	209 lb (95 kg)	2000-01-04	Jackson, Michigan	Des Moines Buccaneers (USHL)	—
26	(United States)	Sam Skinner	Sophomore	D	5' 10" (1.78 m)	175 lb (79 kg)	2001-03-31	Schoolcraft, Michigan	Minot Minotauros (NAHL)	—
27	(Canada)	Cade Kowalski	Junior	F	5' 11" (1.8 m)	181 lb (82 kg)	1999-06-15	Morden, Manitoba	Flin Flon Bombers (SJHL)	—
28	(United States)	Brenden Rons	Junior	D	6' 6" (1.98 m)	220 lb (100 kg)	1998-03-03	Farmington Hills, Michigan	Topeka Pilots (NAHL)	—
29	(United States)	Ethan Stewart (C)	Senior	F	6' 1" (1.85 m)	202 lb (92 kg)	1997-02-10	Rockford, Illinois	Springfield Jr. Blues (NAHL)	—
30	(Finland)	Roni Salmenkangas	Senior	G	6' 0" (1.83 m)	177 lb (80 kg)	1999-03-28	Tampere, Finland	HPK U20 (Nuorten SM-liiga)	—
31	(Canada)	Noah Geisbrecht	Freshman	G	6' 4" (1.93 m)	193 lb (88 kg)	1999-04-18	South Surrey, British Columbia	Windsor (U Sports)	—
33	(United States)	Carter McPhail	Junior	G	5' 10" (1.78 m)	180 lb (82 kg)	1998-12-04	Fenton, Michigan	Johnstown Tomahawks (NAHL)	—
34	(United States)	Nick Grimaldi	Freshman	F	5' 7" (1.7 m)	170 lb (77 kg)	1999-06-26	Plymouth, Michigan	Odessa Jackalopes (NAHL)	—

== Standings ==
2021–22 Central Collegiate Hockey Association Standings
	Conference record										Overall record					
	GP	W	L	T	OTW	OTL	3/SW	PTS	GF	GA	GP	W	L	T	GF	GA
#2 Minnesota State †*	26	23	3	0	2	0	0	67	115	28	44	38	6	0	178	60
#14 Michigan Tech	26	16	8	2	2	4	0	54	93	53	37	21	13	3	118	75
Bemidji State	26	14	12	0	1	1	0	42	83	81	39	19	20	0	118	121
Lake Superior State	26	13	13	0	1	1	0	39	69	64	37	18	18	1	107	104
Northern Michigan	26	12	13	1	3	0	1	35	86	99	37	20	16	1	132	136
Bowling Green	26	11	14	1	2	1	0	33	67	87	37	15	19	3	94	119
Ferris State	26	9	16	1	2	2	0	28	66	99	36	11	24	1	90	135
St. Thomas	26	3	22	1	0	4	0	14	45	112	36	3	32	1	61	168
Championship: March 19, 2022 † indicates conference regular season champion (MacNaughton Cup) * indicates conference tournament champion (Mason Cup); Rankings: USCHO.com Top 20 Poll

== Schedule and results ==
Date	Time	Opponent^{#}	Rank^{#}	Site	TV	Decision	Result	Attendance	Record
Regular Season
October 2	6:07 PM	Miami*		Ewigleben Arena • Big Rapids, MI		Stein	L 4–7	1,757	0–1–0
October 3	4:07 PM	Miami*		Ewigleben Arena • Big Rapids, MI		Stein	W 4–3 ^{OT}	1,507	1–1–0
October 8	7:05 PM	at Western Michigan*		Lawson Arena • Kalamazoo, MI		Stein	L 0–4	3,669	1–2–0
October 9	7:07 PM	Western Michigan*		Ewigleben Arena • Big Rapids, MI		Stein	L 3–4	1,827	1–3–0
October 22	8:07 PM	at St. Thomas		St. Thomas Ice Arena • Mendota Heights, MN		Stein	W 2–1 ^{OT}	0	2–3–0 (1–0–0)
October 23	8:07 PM	at St. Thomas		St. Thomas Ice Arena • Mendota Heights, MN		Stein	L 2–5	0	2–4–0 (1–1–0)
October 29	7:00 PM	at Canisius*		LECOM Harborcenter • Buffalo, NY		Stein	L 4–6	569	2–5–0
October 30	7:00 PM	at Canisius*		LECOM Harborcenter • Buffalo, NY		Salmenkangas	W 4–2	523	3–5–0
November 5	7:07 PM	#2 Minnesota State		Ewigleben Arena • Big Rapids, MI		Stein	W 2–1	1,745	4–5–0 (2–1–0)
November 6	6:07 PM	#2 Minnesota State		Ewigleben Arena • Big Rapids, MI		Salmenkangas	L 1–5	1,776	4–6–0 (2–2–0)
November 12	7:00 PM	at Michigan State*		Munn Ice Arena • East Lansing, MI		Stein	L 0–2	4,622	4–7–0
November 13	7:07 PM	at Michigan State*		Munn Ice Arena • East Lansing, MI		Stein	L 3–4	2,490	4–8–0
November 19	7:07 PM	Northern Michigan		Ewigleben Arena • Big Rapids, MI		Stein	L 3–6	1,097	4–9–0 (2–3–0)
November 20	6:07 PM	Northern Michigan		Ewigleben Arena • Big Rapids, MI		Stein	L 6–7 ^{OT}	1,589	4–10–0 (2–4–0)
November 26	7:07 PM	at Michigan Tech		MacInnes Student Ice Arena • Houghton, MI		Salmenkangas	L 4–6	1,894	4–11–0 (2–5–0)
November 27	6:07 PM	at Michigan Tech		MacInnes Student Ice Arena • Houghton, MI		Stein	L 1–6	1,982	4–12–0 (2–6–0)
December 3	7:07 PM	Lake Superior State		Ewigleben Arena • Big Rapids, MI		Stein	L 0–3	1,344	4–13–0 (2–7–0)
December 4	6:07 PM	Lake Superior State		Ewigleben Arena • Big Rapids, MI		Stein	W 3–1	1,640	5–13–0 (3–7–0)
December 10	7:07 PM	at Bowling Green		Slater Family Ice Arena • Bowling Green, OH		Stein	W 6–3	2,392	6–13–0 (4–7–0)
December 11	7:07 PM	at Bowling Green		Slater Family Ice Arena • Bowling Green, OH		Stein	L 1–2	2,302	6–14–0 (4–8–0)
January 7	8:07 PM	at #1 Minnesota State		Mayo Clinic Health System Event Center • Mankato, MN	CCMk–14	Stein	L 1–7	4,016	6–15–0 (4–9–0)
January 8	7:07 PM	at #1 Minnesota State		Mayo Clinic Health System Event Center • Mankato, MN	CCMk–14	Giesbrecht	L 0–7	4,032	6–16–0 (4–10–0)
January 14	7:07 PM	St. Thomas		Ewigleben Arena • Big Rapids, MI		Giesbrecht	W 3–1	1,647	7–16–0 (5–10–0)
January 15	6:07 PM	St. Thomas		Ewigleben Arena • Big Rapids, MI		Giesbrecht	L 3–4	1,749	7–17–0 (5–11–0)
January 21	8:07 PM	at Bemidji State		Sanford Center • Bemidji, MN		Giesbrecht	W 2–1	2,446	8–17–0 (6–11–0)
January 22	7:07 PM	at Bemidji State		Sanford Center • Bemidji, MN		Giesbrecht	W 5–2	2,681	9–17–0 (7–11–0)
January 28	7:07 PM	Bowling Green		Ewigleben Arena • Big Rapids, MI		Giesbrecht	L 3–4	1,507	9–18–0 (7–12–0)
January 29	6:07 PM	Bowling Green		Ewigleben Arena • Big Rapids, MI		Stein	W 2–1	1,547	10–18–0 (8–12–0)
February 11	7:07 PM	at Lake Superior State		Taffy Abel Arena • Sault Ste. Marie, MI		Giesbrecht	L 3–5	1,037	10–19–0 (8–13–0)
February 12	6:07 PM	at Lake Superior State		Taffy Abel Arena • Sault Ste. Marie, MI		Giesbrecht	L 0–4	1,310	10–20–0 (8–14–0)
February 18	7:07 PM	#14 Michigan Tech		Ewigleben Arena • Big Rapids, MI		Stein	L 3–2 ^{OT}	1,901	10–21–0 (8–15–0)
February 19	6:07 PM	#14 Michigan Tech		Ewigleben Arena • Big Rapids, MI		Giesbrecht	T 5–5 ^{SOL}	2,495	10–21–1 (8–15–1)
February 25	6:37 PM	at Northern Michigan		Berry Events Center • Marquette, MI		Stein	L 1–7	2,114	10–22–1 (8–16–1)
February 26	6:37 PM	at Northern Michigan		Berry Events Center • Marquette, MI		Stein	W 4–2	2,556	11–22–1 (9–16–1)
CCHA Tournament
March 4	7:07 PM	at #15 Michigan Tech*		MacInnes Student Ice Arena • Houghton, MI (Quarterfinal game 1)		Stein	L 2–3 ^{OT}	2,016	11–23–1
March 5	6:07 PM	at #15 Michigan Tech*		MacInnes Student Ice Arena • Houghton, MI (Quarterfinal game 2)		Giesbrecht	L 2–3 ^{2OT}	2,272	11–24–1
Ferris State Lost Series 0–2
*Non-conference game. ^{#}Rankings from USCHO.com Poll. All times are in Eastern Time. Source:

== Scoring statistics ==
Name	Position	Games	Goals	Assists	Points	PIM
Justin Michaelian	F	35	8	15	23	12
Bradley Marek	F	36	10	9	19	12
Dallas Tulik	F	29	7	12	19	32
Liam MacDougall	F	35	6	11	17	49
Štěpán Pokorný	F	31	3	11	14	16
Marshall Moise	F	34	10	3	13	50
Ethan Stewart	F	30	5	8	13	23
Brendon Michaelian	D	34	1	12	13	10
Mitchel Deelstra	LW	28	4	8	12	22
Blake Evennou	D	36	4	8	12	28
Kaleb Ergang	RW	21	5	6	11	17
Jake Transit	F	16	4	4	8	22
Nick Nardecchia	RW	25	4	3	7	20
Brenden Rons	D	36	4	3	7	16
Zach Faremouth	F	32	3	4	7	48
Drew Cooper	D	29	1	6	7	10
Jacob Dirks	F	25	4	2	6	6
Sam Skinner	D	18	2	4	6	6
Luke Farthing	D	24	1	5	6	6
Antonio Venuto	RW	28	2	3	5	14
Brenden MacLaren	F	23	1	4	5	27
Ben Schultheis	D	28	0	5	5	20
Nico DeVita	D	29	1	2	3	10
Jason Brancheau	F	4	0	1	1	0
Austin McCarthy	F	5	0	0	0	4
Carter McPhail	G	6	0	0	0	0
Roni Salmenkangas	G	8	0	0	0	0
Noah Giesbrecht	G	11	0	0	0	0
Connor Fedorek	D	12	0	0	0	4
Logan Stein	G	26	0	0	0	2
Total			90	147	237	494

== Goaltending statistics ==
Name	Games	Minutes	Wins	Losses	Ties	Goals against	Saves	Shut outs	SV %	GAA
Carter McPhail	4	43	0	0	0	2	23	0	.920	2.74
Noah Giesbrecht	10	598	3	6	1	32	269	0	.894	3.21
Logan Stein	26	1316	7	16	0	79	608	0	.885	3.60
Roni Salmenkangas	8	229	1	2	0	17	89	0	.840	4.45
Empty Net	-	15	-	-	-	5	-	-	-	-
Total	36	2201	11	24	1	135	989	0	.881	3.65

== Rankings ==
Poll	Week																									
Poll	Pre	1	2	3	4	5	6	7	8	9	10	11	12	13	14	15	16	17	18	19	20	21	22	23	24	25 (Final)
USCHO.com	NR	NR	NR	NR	NR	NR	NR	NR	NR	NR	NR	NR	NR	NR	NR	NR	NR	NR	NR	NR	NR	NR	NR	NR	-	NR
USA Today	NR	NR	NR	NR	NR	NR	NR	NR	NR	NR	NR	NR	NR	NR	NR	NR	NR	NR	NR	NR	NR	NR	NR	NR	NR	NR

Note: USCHO did not release a poll in week 24.

== Awards and honors ==
Player	Award	Ref
Bradley Marek	CCHA Rookie of the Year	
Bradley Marek	CCHA Rookie Team	
