= Wyatt Aamodt =

American ice hockey player (born 1997)

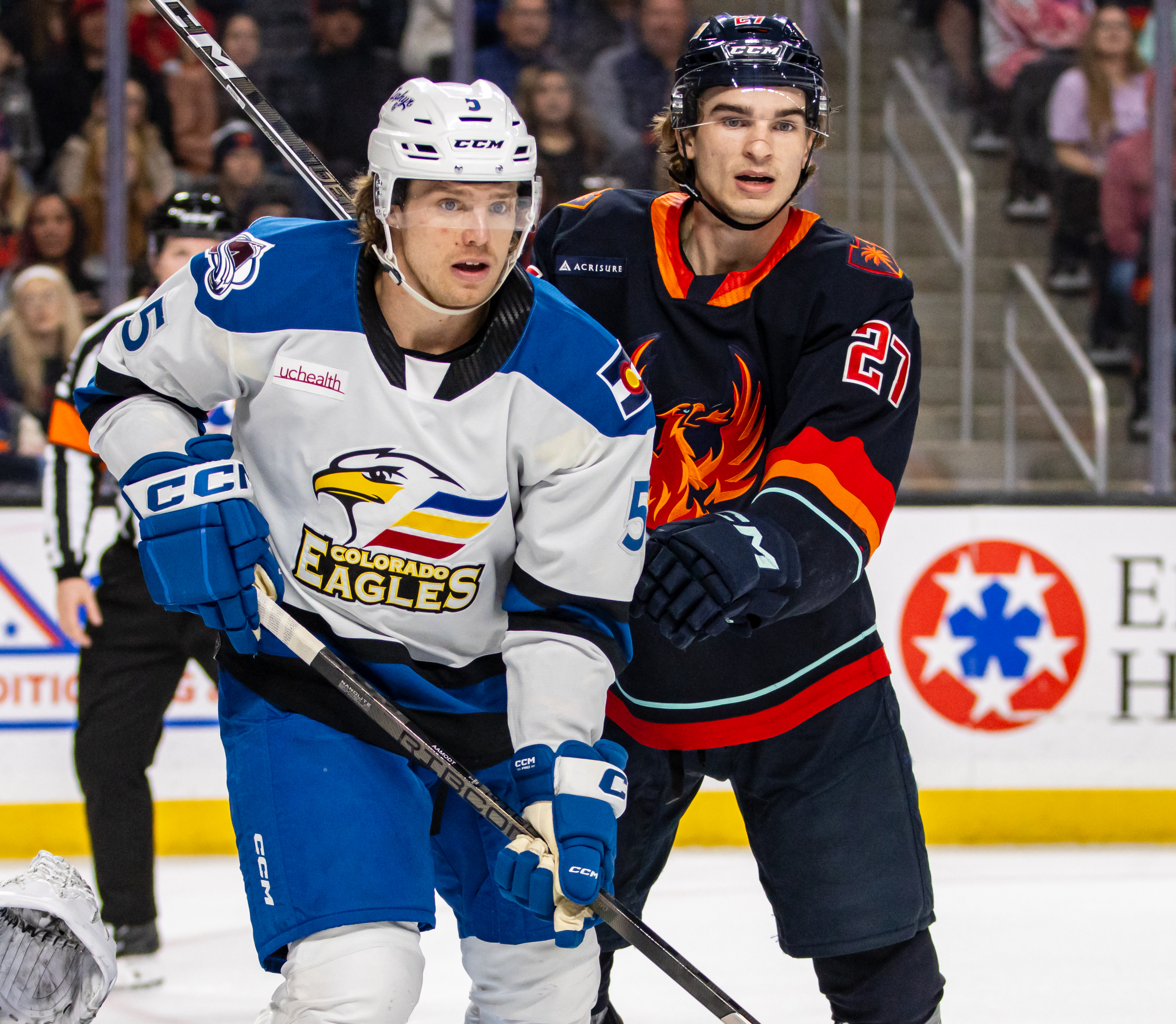
- Born: November 22, 1997 (age 28) Hermantown, Minnesota, US
- Height: 6 ft 0 in (183 cm)
- Weight: 201 lb (91 kg; 14 st 5 lb)
- Position: Defense
- Shoots: Left
- NHL team (P) Cur. team: Colorado Avalanche; Colorado Eagles (AHL)
- NHL draft: Undrafted
- Playing career: 2022–present

Wyatt Aamodt (born November 22, 1997) is an American professional ice hockey defenseman currently playing for the Colorado Eagles in the American Hockey League (AHL) while under contract as a prospect to the Colorado Avalanche of the National Hockey League (NHL).

== Career statistics ==
			Regular season					Playoffs
Season	Team	League	GP	G	A	Pts	PIM	GP	G	A	Pts	PIM
2013–14	Hermantown High	USHS	25	6	18	24	28	3	1	5	6	0
2014–15	Hermantown High	USHS	25	9	24	33	21	3	1	5	6	0
2015–16	Hermantown High	USHS	24	5	25	30	34	3	0	8	8	0
2015–16	Chicago Steel	USHL	13	0	1	1	6	—	—	—	—	—
2016–17	Chicago Steel	USHL	53	1	18	19	40	—	—	—	—	—
2017–18	Lincoln Stars	USHL	49	4	22	26	68	7	0	0	0	6
2018–19	Minnesota State	WCHA	36	1	5	6	29	—	—	—	—	—
2019–20	Minnesota State	WCHA	18	1	3	4	12	—	—	—	—	—
2020–21	Minnesota State	WCHA	28	2	5	7	10	—	—	—	—	—
2021–22	Minnesota State	CCHA	41	6	6	12	33	—	—	—	—	—
2021–22	Colorado Eagles	AHL	3	0	0	0	0	9	0	0	0	0
2022–23	Colorado Eagles	AHL	52	3	15	18	39	7	0	1	1	2
2023–24	Colorado Eagles	AHL	60	6	8	14	49	2	0	0	0	2
2024–25	Colorado Eagles	AHL	69	4	13	17	47	9	1	2	3	8
2024–25	Colorado Avalanche	NHL	2	1	0	1	0	—	—	—	—	—
2025–26	Colorado Eagles	AHL	65	4	20	24	34	17	1	2	3	8
NHL totals			2	1	0	1	0	—	—	—	—	—
