= CCHA Forward of the Year =

- Sport: Ice hockey
- Awarded for: The Forward of the Year in the CCHA

History
- First award: 2022
- Most recent: Stiven Sardarian

The CCHA Forward of the Year is an annual award given out after the conclusion of the Central Collegiate Hockey Association regular season to the best forward in the conference as voted by the coaches of each CCHA team. The award was a new creation by the conference in its return to play.

== Award winners ==
Year	Winner	Position	School
2021–22	Nathan Smith	Center	Minnesota State
2022–23	David Silye	Center	Minnesota State
2023–24	Sam Morton	Forward	Minnesota State
2024–25	Rhett Pitlick	Forward	Minnesota State
2025–26	Stiven Sardarian	Forward	Michigan Tech

=== Winners by school ===
School	Winners
Minnesota State	4
Michigan Tech	1

=== Winners by position ===
Position	Winners
Center	2
Left Wing	0
Right Wing	0
Forward	3

== See also ==
- CCHA Awards
