= Nathan Smith (ice hockey, born 1998) =

American ice hockey player (born 1998)

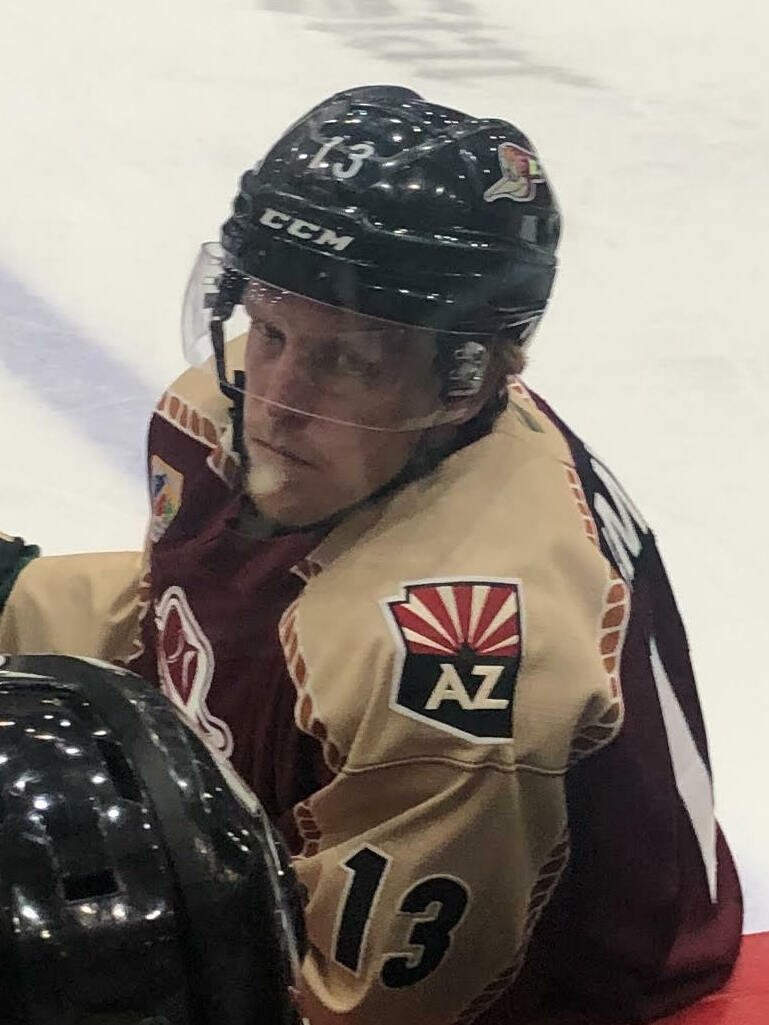
- Smith with the Tucson Roadrunners in 2023
- Born: October 19, 1998 (age 27) Tampa, Florida, U.S.
- Height: 6 ft 0 in (183 cm)
- Weight: 177 lb (80 kg; 12 st 9 lb)
- Position: Center
- Shoots: Right
- AHL team Former teams: Charlotte Checkers; Arizona Coyotes
- National team: United States
- NHL draft: 91st overall, 2018; Winnipeg Jets
- Playing career: 2022–present

Nathan Smith (born October 19, 1998) is an American professional ice hockey center for the Charlotte Checkers of the American Hockey League (AHL). He previously played for the Arizona Coyotes. He was a member of the United States national team at the 2022 Winter Olympics.

== Playing career ==
Growing up in Florida, Smith initially played roller hockey before switching to ice hockey when he was 10 with the Tampa Scorpions youth program. He was a high-scoring forward in junior hockey, leading the Cedar Rapids RoughRiders for two consecutive years. Despite being taken by the Winnipeg Jets in the 2018 NHL Draft, he remained in juniors for another year before beginning his college career. He debuted for Minnesota State in 2019 and provided second-line scoring for a team that was ranked #1 for a time during the season. Minnesota State entered the postseason as one of the favorites to contend for a national title. However, the COVID-19 pandemic caused the Mavericks' season to end abruptly.

After the end of his freshman year was canceled, Smith's sophomore season was delayed by over a month. Despite the upheaval, Smith put up good numbers and finished second on the team in scoring. In the Mavericks' first game of the NCAA Tournament, they were down 1–3 with under 10 minutes to play. Smith scored to cut the lead in half, which began a tremendous comeback by MSU that led to the program's first tournament win at the Division I level. After scoring a goal in Minnesota State's 4–0 win over Minnesota, he added two more on the power play against St. Cloud State in the national semifinal. While it wasn't enough to get the Mavericks a win, it did earn him a spot on the All-Tournament Team.

At the start of his junior season in 2021–22, Smith began scoring in bunches. By the end of December, he was leading the nation in scoring. He would finish the season, placing second in league-wide scoring having registered 19 goals and 50 points in 38 games with Minnesota State. He helped the Mavericks reach the Frozen Four championship game against the University of Denver and was a Hobey Baker top 10 finalist.

On March 21, 2022, Smith's NHL rights were traded by the Jets, along with the contract of Bryan Little, to the Arizona Coyotes in exchange for a 2022 fourth-round draft pick. At the conclusion of his junior season, Smith was immediately signed by the Coyotes to a two-year, entry-level contract on April 11, 2022. One day later on April 12, 2022, Smith made his NHL debut against the New Jersey Devils. He registered his first NHL point setting up a Nick Ritchie goal in a 5–3 loss to the Carolina Hurricanes on April 19. He scored his first NHL goal on April 20 against Kevin Lankinen in a 4–3 overtime loss to the Chicago Blackhawks. He finished the season with Arizona playing in ten games, scoring two goals and four points.

Smith spent the majority of the 2022–23 season with the Coyotes' American Hockey League (AHL) affiliate, the Tucson Roadrunners. He was recalled by Arizona in March. He appeared in four games before being sent back to the Roadrunners. In the offseason, Smith signed on a one-year, two-way contract with Arizona on July 8. Smith was assigned to the AHL at the start of the 2023–24 season. He spent the entire season in Tucson, scoring 12 goals and 31 points in 60 games. He also appeared in one playoff game in the 2024 Calder Cup playoffs.

As an unrestricted free agent following the 2023–24 season, Smith signed a one-year, two-way contract with the Vancouver Canucks on July 1, 2024. During training camp, Smith went unclaimed on waivers and was assigned to Vancouver's AHL affiliate, the Abbotsford Canucks for the 2024–25 season.

After helping Abbotsford to the Calder Cup, Smith left the Canucks organization as a free agent. Remaining un-signed leading into the 2025–26 season, Smith was belatedly signed to a two-year AHL contract with the Charlotte Checkers, affiliate to the Florida Panthers, on December 11, 2025.

== International play ==
In the midst of a standout junior collegiate season, Smith was as a prime target for the United States national team when the NHL announced that it would not be sending its players to Beijing for the Winter Olympics. Less than a month later, Smith was named to the team. In a fifth-place finish with Team USA, Smith contributed 1 goal and 2 points through 4 games.

== Career statistics ==
=== Regular season and playoffs ===
			Regular season					Playoffs
Season	Team	League	GP	G	A	Pts	PIM	GP	G	A	Pts	PIM
2016–17	Aberdeen Wings	NAHL	4	1	1	2	18	—	—	—	—	—
2017–18	Cedar Rapids RoughRiders	USHL	51	17	30	47	84	—	—	—	—	—
2018–19	Cedar Rapids RoughRiders	USHL	59	18	35	53	81	4	0	1	1	12
2019–20	Minnesota State	WCHA	35	9	18	27	37	—	—	—	—	—
2020–21	Minnesota State	WCHA	28	9	16	25	16	—	—	—	—	—
2021–22	Minnesota State	CCHA	38	19	31	50	43	—	—	—	—	—
2021–22	Arizona Coyotes	NHL	10	2	2	4	2	—	—	—	—	—
2022–23	Tucson Roadrunners	AHL	64	12	15	27	37	1	0	0	0	0
2022–23	Arizona Coyotes	NHL	4	0	0	0	4	—	—	—	—	—
2023–24	Tucson Roadrunners	AHL	60	12	19	31	38	—	—	—	—	—
2024–25	Abbotsford Canucks	AHL	60	9	17	26	38	22	4	5	9	22
2025–26	Charlotte Checkers	AHL	47	12	19	31	41	3	0	1	1	2
NHL totals			14	2	2	4	6	—	—	—	—	—

=== International ===
Year	Team	Event	Result	GP	G	A	Pts	PIM
2022	United States	OG	5th	4	1	1	2	2
Senior totals				4	1	1	2	2

== Awards and honors ==
Award	Year
Collegiate
WCHA All-Rookie Team	2019–20
All-WCHA Second Team	2020–21
NCAA All-Tournament Team	2021
CCHA Forward of the year	2021–22
All-CCHA First Team	2021–22
AHCA West First Team All-American	2021–22
AHL
Calder Cup Champion	2025

Awards and achievements
Preceded by Award Created	CCHA Forward of the Year; 2021–22	Succeeded by David Silye
