= 2024–25 Northern Michigan Wildcats men's ice hockey season =

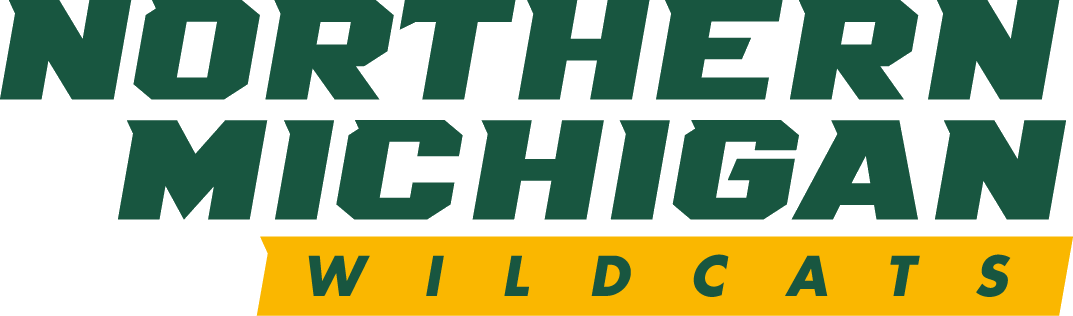
- Conference: 9th CCHA
- Home ice: Berry Events Center

Rankings
- USCHO: NR
- USA Hockey: NR

Record
- Overall: 5–27–2
- Conference: 4–20–2
- Home: 2–14–0
- Road: 3–11–2
- Neutral: 0–2–0

Coaches and captains
- Head coach: Dave Shyiak
- Assistant coaches: Andy Contois; Phil Fox; Ben Russell
- Captain: Tanner Latsch
- Alternate captain(s): Tynan Ewart; Jakob Peterson; Matthew Romer; Jesse Tucker

The 2024–25 Northern Michigan Wildcats men's ice hockey season was the 49th season of play for the program and 27th in the CCHA. The Wildcats represented Northern Michigan University in the 2024–25 NCAA Division I men's ice hockey season, played their home games at Berry Events Center and were coached by Dave Shyiak in his 1st season.

== Season ==
With an off-season coaching change, combined with a disappointing season, Northern Michigan experienced the greatest amount of roster turnover in the history of the program. Just four of thirty players on the roster returned (Tanner Latsch, Zach Michaelis, Jakob Peterson and Brendan Poshak) with just 42 games played between them in 23–24 (approximately 6.5% of the man-games). While the Wildcats were bound to lose some players through graduation, the transfer portal helped to induce eleven players to leave for other programs. Northern Michigan was able to add several new players through the portal to mitigate some of the losses but the majority of their recruiting class were new to college hockey.

After a bit of a rough start, the defense settled down and didn't play too poorly from November on. The Wildcats got decent goaltending from Ryan Ouellette who, although he allowed nearly 3 goals per game for the year, stopped nearly 92% of the shots he faced. Unfortunately, the completely remade offense was never able to find its footing. Northern Michigan had the lowest scoring numbers in the nation, averaging 1.62 goals over the season. While the offense picked up in the second half of the year, it wasn't enough to prevent the team from posting the worst record in program history. Due to the CCHA allowing Augustana to compete for a playoff spot, Northern Michigan's 9th-place finish left them without a single postseason game for the first time since their inaugural year.

Though there was little that went well for the Wildcats this season, there wasn't anywhere for the program to go but up.

== Departures ==
Player	Position	Nationality	Cause
Isack Bandu	Defenseman	Canada	Transferred to St. Lawrence
Tyrell Boucher	Defenseman	Canada	Graduation (signed with Falher Pirates)
Michael Colella	Forward	United States	Graduate transfer to Canisius
Mitchel Deelstra	Forward	Canada	Graduate transfer to Robert Morris
Connor Eddy	Forward	Canada	Transferred to Massachusetts Lowell
Colby Enns	Defenseman	United States	Graduate transfer to Merrimack
Reilly Funk	Forward	Canada	Transferred to Bemidji State
Aiden Gallacher	Defenseman	United States	Graduate transfer to Omaha
André Ghantous	Forward	United States	Graduation (signed with Adirondack Thunder)
Charlie Glockner	Goaltender	United States	Transferred to St. Cloud State
Luke Gramer	Defenseman	United States	Left program (retired)
Viking Gustafsson Nyberg	Defenseman	Sweden	Transferred to Connecticut
Béni Halász	Goaltender	Hungary	Transferred to St. Cloud State
Travis Hensrud	Forward	Canada	Transferred to Windsor
Matvei Kabanov	Forward	Russia	Transferred to Bowling Green
Kevin Marx-Norén	Forward	Sweden	Transferred to RIT
Michael Mesic	Forward	United States	Returned to juniors (Youngstown Phantoms)
Kristóf Papp	Forward	Hungary	Graduate transfer to Lindenwood
Jack Perbix	Forward/Defenseman	United States	Graduation (signed with Iowa Heartlanders)
Artem Shlaine	Forward	Russia	Graduate transfer to Arizona State
Grant Slukynsky	Forward	United States	Transferred to Western Michigan
Carsen Stokes	Goaltender	United States	Transferred to Augsburg
Mike Van Unen	Defenseman	Canada	Graduation (signed with Adirondack Thunder)
Rylan Van Unen	Forward	Canada	Graduation (signed with Allen Americans)
Josh Zinger	Defenseman	Canada	Transferred to St. Cloud State

== Recruiting ==
Player	Position	Nationality	Age	Notes
Jakub Altrichter	Forward	Czech Republic	21	Prague, CZE
Nick Ardanaz	Defenseman	Canada	22	Surrey, BC; transfer from Rensselaer
Matt Argentina	Forward	United States	21	Philadelphia, PA; transfer from Boston College
Ethan Barwick	Goaltender	Canada	22	St. Albert, AB; transfer from Lindenwood
Médrick Bolduc	Forward	Canada	21	Val-d'Or, QC
Colby Browne	Forward	United States	21	Evergreen, CO
Danny Ciccarello	Forward	Canada	23	Kirkland, QC; transfer from Rensselaer
Anthony Cliche	Defenseman	Canada	21	Vallée-Jonction, QC
Grayden Daul	Defenseman	United States	21	Chicago, IL
Will Diamond	Forward	United States	20	Carpentersville, IL
Ryan Duguay	Forward	Canada	20	Edmonton, AB
Tynan Ewart	Defenseman	Canada	22	Duncan, BC; transfer from St. Cloud State
Wolfgang Govedaris	Defenseman	United States	21	Bristol, CT
Aidyn Hutchinson	Forward	Canada	21	St. Albert, AB
Rasmus Larsson	Defenseman	Sweden	20	Hässelby, SWE; selected 152nd overall in 2023
Jakub Lewandowski	Forward	Poland	22	Toruń, POL; transfer from Bemidji State
Trevor Mitchell	Defenseman	United States	21	South Lyon, MI
Julian Molinaro	Goaltender	Canada	20	Mississauga, ON
Ryan Ouellette	Goaltender	United States	23	Colorado Springs, CO; transfer from Niagara
Billy Renfrew	Forward	United States	21	Fairbanks, AK
Matthew Romer	Forward	United States	22	Chicago, IL; transfer from Arizona State
Joe Schiller	Defenseman	United States	20	Moorhead, MN
Grayden Slipec	Forward	Canada	23	Surrey, BC
Jesse Tucker	Forward	Canada	24	Longlac, ON; transfer from Clarkson

== Roster ==
As of September 13, 2024.

No.	Nat.	Player	Class	Pos	Height	Weight	DoB	Hometown	Previous team	NHL rights
2	(United States)	Joe Schiller	Freshman	D	6' 0" (1.83 m)	190 lb (86 kg)	2004-09-23	Moorhead, Minnesota	Cedar Rapids RoughRiders (USHL)	—
3	(Canada)	Nick Ardanaz	Junior	D	5' 10" (1.78 m)	185 lb (84 kg)	2002-05-30	Surrey, British Columbia	Rensselaer (ECAC)	—
4	(United States)	Wolfgang Govedaris	Freshman	D	6' 2" (1.88 m)	201 lb (91 kg)	2003-04-16	Bristol, Connecticut	Corpus Christi IceRays (NAHL)	—
5	(United States)	Grayden Daul	Freshman	D	6' 0" (1.83 m)	181 lb (82 kg)	2003-01-31	Chicago, Illinois	Langley Rivermen (BCHL)	—
6	(Canada)	Tynan Ewart (A)	Sophomore	D	6' 0" (1.83 m)	188 lb (85 kg)	2002-02-26	Duncan, British Columbia	St. Cloud State (NCHC)	—
7	(United States)	Brendan Poshak	Sophomore	F	5' 8" (1.73 m)	170 lb (77 kg)	2002-07-13	Green Bay, Wisconsin	Brooks Bandits (AJHL)	—
8	(Sweden)	Rasmus Larsson	Freshman	D	6' 3" (1.91 m)	203 lb (92 kg)	2004-02-09	Hässelby, Sweden	Green Bay Gamblers (USHL)	NYR, 152nd overall 2023
9	(United States)	Zach Michaelis	Junior	F	6' 1" (1.85 m)	203 lb (92 kg)	2002-05-30	Elk River, Minnesota	Trail Smoke Eaters (BCHL)	—
10	(United States)	Trevor Mitchell	Freshman	D	6' 4" (1.93 m)	179 lb (81 kg)	2003-05-08	South Lyon, Michigan	Odessa Jackalopes (NAHL)	—
11	(United States)	Billy Renfrew	Freshman	F	5' 10" (1.78 m)	181 lb (82 kg)	2003-08-14	Fairbanks, Alaska	Penticton Vees (BCHL)	—
13	(Canada)	Médrick Bolduc	Freshman	F	5' 9" (1.75 m)	183 lb (83 kg)	2003-07-09	Val-d'Or, Quebec	El Paso Rhinos (NAHL)	—
14	(Czech Republic)	Jakub Altrichter	Freshman	F	5' 10" (1.78 m)	154 lb (70 kg)	2003-07-26	Prague, Czech Republic	Waterloo Black Hawks (USHL)	—
15	(Canada)	Grayden Slipec	Freshman	F	5' 10" (1.78 m)	190 lb (86 kg)	2005-03-06	Surrey, British Columbia	Chicago Steel (USHL)	—
17	(United States)	Matthew Romer (A)	Sophomore	F	5' 9" (1.75 m)	178 lb (81 kg)	2002-09-01	Chicago, Illinois	Arizona State (NCAA)	—
18	(Canada)	Ryan Duguay	Freshman	F	6' 2" (1.88 m)	187 lb (85 kg)	2003-10-18	Edmonton, Alberta	Melfort Mustangs (SJHL)	—
19	(Canada)	Jesse Tucker (A)	Senior	F	5' 11" (1.8 m)	187 lb (85 kg)	2000-03-01	Longlac, Ontario	Clarkson (ECAC)	—
20	(Canada)	Anthony Cliche	Freshman	D	6' 4" (1.93 m)	216 lb (98 kg)	2003-06-09	Vallée-Jonction, Quebec	Vernon Vipers (BCHL)	—
21	(United States)	Colby Browne	Freshman	F	5' 10" (1.78 m)	183 lb (83 kg)	2003-05-04	Evergreen, Colorado	Whitecourt Wolverines (AJHL)	—
22	(United States)	Tanner Latsch (C)	Sophomore (RS)	F	6' 2" (1.88 m)	190 lb (86 kg)	2002-01-02	Muskegon, Michigan	Des Moines Buccaneers (USHL)	—
23	(United States)	Jakob Peterson (A)	Junior (RS)	D	6' 3" (1.91 m)	172 lb (78 kg)	2002-04-18	Marquette, Michigan	Amarillo Wranglers (NAHL)	—
24	(United States)	Will Diamond	Freshman	F	6' 4" (1.93 m)	196 lb (89 kg)	2003-12-22	Carpentersville, Illinois	Austin Bruins (NAHL)	—
26	(Poland)	Jakub Lewandowski	Senior	F	6' 4" (1.93 m)	203 lb (92 kg)	2001-10-25	Toruń, Poland	Bemidji State (CCHA)	—
27	(Canada)	Danny Ciccarello	Sophomore	F	6' 0" (1.83 m)	200 lb (91 kg)	2001-03-23	Kirkland, Quebec	Rensselaer (ECAC)	—
28	(United States)	Matt Argentina	Junior	F	5' 10" (1.78 m)	184 lb (83 kg)	2003-01-16	Philadelphia, Pennsylvania	Chilliwack Chiefs (BCHL)	—
29	(Canada)	Aidyn Hutchinson	Freshman	F	6' 1" (1.85 m)	172 lb (78 kg)	2003-09-11	St. Albert, Alberta	Melfort Mustangs (SJHL)	—
30	(United States)	Ryan Ouellette	Senior	G	6' 0" (1.83 m)	200 lb (91 kg)	2000-12-06	Colorado Springs, Colorado	Niagara (AHA)	—
31	(Canada)	Julian Molinaro	Freshman	G	5' 11" (1.8 m)	179 lb (81 kg)	2003-12-02	Mississauga, Ontario	Calgary Canucks (AJHL)	—
33	(Canada)	Ethan Barwick	Freshman (RS)	G	6' 3" (1.91 m)	202 lb (92 kg)	2002-05-17	St. Albert, Alberta	Lindenwood (NCAA)	—

== Standings ==
2024–25 Central Collegiate Hockey Association standings
	Conference record											Overall record					
	GP	W	L	T	OTW	OTL	SW	PTS	PCT ^	GF	GA	GP	W	L	T	GF	GA
#14 Minnesota State †*	26	18	5	3	3	1	1	56	.718	77	37	39	27	9	3	113	58
Augustana	16	9	5	2	1	1	1	30	.625	48	37	35	18	13	4	97	75
St. Thomas	26	13	9	4	1	1	1	42	.564	76	66	38	19	14	5	111	101
Bowling Green	26	12	10	4	2	3	2	43	.551	69	63	36	18	14	4	90	85
Michigan Tech	26	12	11	3	1	1	1	40	.513	75	69	36	16	17	3	95	96
Ferris State	26	12	13	1	1	0	0	36	.462	74	81	36	13	20	3	89	128
Bemidji State	26	10	12	4	3	1	4	36	.462	63	78	38	15	18	5	93	114
Lake Superior State	26	10	15	1	0	4	0	35	.449	71	76	36	12	22	2	93	115
Northern Michigan	26	4	20	2	1	1	2	16	.205	42	88	34	5	27	2	55	115
Championship: March 21, 2025 † indicates conference regular-season champion (MacNaughton Cup) * indicates conference tournament champion (Mason Cup)^ Because Augustana played a transition schedule of 16 games against conference opponents, winning percentage was used to determine conference position. Rankings: USCHO.com Top 20 Poll

== Schedule and results ==
Date	Time	Opponent^{#}	Rank^{#}	Site	TV	Decision	Result	Attendance	Record
Exhibition
October 5	6:07 pm	at Michigan Tech*		MacInnes Student Ice Arena • Houghton, Michigan (Exhibition, Rivalry)	Midco Sports+	Ouellette	L 3–4	4,071	
Regular Season
October 11	9:00 pm	at #12 Colorado College*		Ed Robson Arena • Colorado Springs, Colorado	SOCO CW	Ouellette	L 3–4 ^{OT}	3,650	0–1–0
October 12	8:00 pm	at #12 Colorado College*		Ed Robson Arena • Colorado Springs, Colorado	SOCO CW	Barwick	L 1–6	3,650	0–2–0
October 18	7:07 pm	Alaska Anchorage*		Berry Events Center • Marquette, Michigan	Midco Sports+	Ouellette	W 2–1	2,916	1–2–0
October 19	6:07 pm	Alaska Anchorage*		Berry Events Center • Marquette, Michigan	Midco Sports+	Ouellette	L 3–5	2,762	1–3–0
October 25	7:07 pm	Arizona State*		Berry Events Center • Marquette, Michigan	Midco Sports+	Ouellette	L 1–3	2,576	1–4–0
October 26	6:07 pm	Arizona State*		Berry Events Center • Marquette, Michigan	Midco Sports+	Ouellette	L 0–2	2,772	1–5–0
November 1	7:07 pm	Michigan Tech		Berry Events Center • Marquette, Michigan (Rivalry)	Midco Sports+	Ouellette	L 0–3	4,272	1–6–0 (0–1–0)
November 2	6:07 pm	at Michigan Tech		MacInnes Student Ice Arena • Houghton, Michigan (Rivalry)	Midco Sports+	Ouellette	L 3–6	3,136	1–7–0 (0–2–0)
November 8	7:07 pm	Lake Superior State		Berry Events Center • Marquette, Michigan	Midco Sports+	Ouellette	L 0–5	2,569	1–8–0 (0–3–0)
November 9	6:07 pm	Lake Superior State		Berry Events Center • Marquette, Michigan	Midco Sports+	Ouellette	L 1–5	2,518	1–9–0 (0–4–0)
November 15	8:07 pm	at #16 Minnesota State		Mayo Clinic Health System Event Center • Mankato, Minnesota	Midco Sports+	Ouellette	L 0–3	4,100	1–10–0 (0–5–0)
November 16	7:07 pm	at #16 Minnesota State		Mayo Clinic Health System Event Center • Mankato, Minnesota	Midco Sports+	Ouellette	T 1–1 ^{SOW}	4,557	1–10–1 (0–5–1)
November 29	8:07 pm	at Augustana		Midco Arena • Sioux Falls, South Dakota	Midco Sports+	Ouellette	L 1–4	2,377	1–11–1 (0–6–1)
November 30	7:07 pm	at Augustana		Midco Arena • Sioux Falls, South Dakota	Midco Sports+	Ouellette	L 1–4	2,525	1–12–1 (0–7–1)
December 6	7:07 pm	Ferris State		Berry Events Center • Marquette, Michigan	Midco Sports+	Ouellette	L 1–3	2,214	1–13–1 (0–8–1)
December 7	6:07 pm	Ferris State		Berry Events Center • Marquette, Michigan	Midco Sports+	Ouellette	L 1–2	2,236	1–14–1 (0–9–1)
December 13	7:07 pm	at Bowling Green		Slater Family Ice Arena • Bowling Green, Ohio	Midco Sports+	Ouellette	L 0–2	1,654	1–15–1 (0–10–1)
December 14	7:07 pm	at Bowling Green		Slater Family Ice Arena • Bowling Green, Ohio	Midco Sports+	Ouellette	L 3–4	1,777	1–16–1 (0–11–1)
Great Lakes Invitational
December 29	7:00 pm	vs. #1 Michigan State*		Van Andel Arena • Grand Rapids, Michigan (Great Lakes Invitational Semifinal)	Midco Sports+	Ouellette	L 0–2	9,900	1–17–1
December 30	3:30 pm	vs. Michigan Tech*		Van Andel Arena • Grand Rapids, Michigan (Great Lakes Invitational Consolation Game, Rivalry)	Midco Sports+	Barwick	L 3–4 ^{OT}	6,857	1–18–1
January 10	7:07 pm	#12 Minnesota State		Berry Events Center • Marquette, Michigan	Midco Sports+	Ouellette	W 3–2	2,436	2–18–1 (1–11–1)
January 11	6:07 pm	#12 Minnesota State		Berry Events Center • Marquette, Michigan	Midco Sports+	Ouellette	L 1–6	2,581	2–19–1 (1–12–1)
January 17	8:07 pm	at Bemidji State		Sanford Center • Bemidji, Minnesota	Midco Sports+	Ouellette	W 4–1	2,142	3–19–1 (2–12–1)
January 18	7:07 pm	at Bemidji State		Sanford Center • Bemidji, Minnesota	Midco Sports+	Ouellette	W 3–1	1,599	4–19–1 (3–12–1)
January 24	7:07 pm	at Michigan Tech		MacInnes Student Ice Arena • Houghton, Michigan (Rivalry)	Midco Sports+	Ouellette	L 2–3	3,496	4–20–1 (3–13–1)
January 25	6:07 pm	Michigan Tech		Berry Events Center • Marquette, Michigan (Rivalry)	Midco Sports+	Ouellette	L 0–4	4,110	4–21–1 (3–14–1)
January 31	7:07 pm	Bowling Green		Berry Events Center • Marquette, Michigan	Midco Sports+	Ouellette	L 2–3 ^{OT}	2,071	4–22–1 (3–15–1)
February 1	6:07 pm	Bowling Green		Berry Events Center • Marquette, Michigan	Midco Sports+	Ouellette	L 2–5	2,471	4–23–1 (3–16–1)
February 7	7:07 pm	at Lake Superior State		Taffy Abel Arena • Sault Ste. Marie, Michigan	Midco Sports+	Ouellette	L 2–3	—	4–24–1 (3–17–1)
February 8	6:07 pm	at Lake Superior State		Taffy Abel Arena • Sault Ste. Marie, Michigan	Midco Sports+	Ouellette	W 3–2 ^{OT}	—	5–24–1 (4–17–1)
February 21	7:07 pm	St. Thomas		Berry Events Center • Marquette, Michigan	Midco Sports+	Ouellette	L 0–3	2,221	5–25–1 (4–18–1)
February 22	6:07 pm	St. Thomas		Berry Events Center • Marquette, Michigan	Midco Sports+	Ouellette	L 3–4	2,603	5–26–1 (4–19–1)
February 28	7:07 pm	at Ferris State		Ewigleben Arena • Big Rapids, Michigan	Midco Sports+	Ouellette	L 1–5	2,133	5–27–1 (4–20–1)
March 1	6:07 pm	at Ferris State		Ewigleben Arena • Big Rapids, Michigan	Midco Sports+	Ouellette	T 4–4 ^{SOW}	2,200	5–27–2 (4–20–2)
*Non-conference game. ^{#}Rankings from USCHO.com Poll. All times are in Eastern Time. Source:

== Scoring statistics ==
Name	Position	Games	Goals	Assists	Points	PIM
Grayden Slipec	F	32	10	9	19	14
Jakub Altrichter	C	32	3	16	19	4
Tynan Ewart	D	34	1	10	11	4
Aidyn Hutchinson	F	30	4	6	10	16
Anthony Cliche	D	34	4	5	9	14
Ryan Duguay	C/RW	24	6	2	8	4
Matthew Romer	F	23	5	3	8	4
Jesse Tucker	C	34	3	5	8	26
Tanner Latsch	C	22	5	2	7	6
Jakob Peterson	D	29	2	4	6	12
Médrick Bolduc	F	26	2	3	5	34
Danny Ciccarello	F	22	1	4	5	12
Matt Argentina	C	16	2	2	4	10
Rasmus Larsson	D	29	3	0	3	14
Zach Michaelis	C	27	1	2	3	0
Billy Renfrew	F	31	1	2	3	2
Joe Schiller	D	10	0	3	3	4
Jakub Lewandowski	F	17	0	3	3	4
Nicolas Ardanaz	D	26	0	3	3	6
Brendan Poshak	F	25	1	1	2	4
Will Diamond	F	22	1	0	1	21
Trevor Mitchell	D	14	0	1	1	6
Colby Browne	F	19	0	1	1	6
Grayden Daul	D	28	0	1	1	16
Ryan Ouellette	G	32	0	1	1	0
Julian Molinaro	G	1	0	0	0	0
Ethan Barwick	G	6	0	0	0	0
Wolfgang Govedaris	D	30	0	0	0	20
Total			55	89	144	279

== Goaltending statistics ==
Name	Games	Minutes	Wins	Losses	Ties	Goals Against	Saves	Shut Outs	SV %	GAA
Julian Molinaro	1	33:09	0	0	0	1	22	0	.957	1.81
Ryan Ouellette	32	1771:05	5	25	2	87	955	0	.917	2.95
Ethan Barwick	6	221:51	0	2	0	16	106	0	.869	4.33
Empty Net	-	33:21	-	-	-	11	-	-	-	-
Total	34	2059:26	5	27	2	115	1083	0	.904	3.35

== Rankings ==
Poll	Week																											
Poll	Pre	1	2	3	4	5	6	7	8	9	10	11	12	13	14	15	16	17	18	19	20	21	22	23	24	25	26	27 (Final)
USCHO.com	NR	NR	NR	NR	NR	NR	NR	NR	NR	NR	NR	NR	–	NR	NR	NR	NR	NR	NR	NR	NR	NR	NR	NR	NR	NR	–	NR
USA Hockey	NR	NR	NR	NR	NR	NR	NR	NR	NR	NR	NR	NR	–	NR	NR	NR	NR	NR	NR	NR	NR	NR	NR	NR	NR	NR	NR	NR

Note: USCHO did not release a poll in week 12 or 26.
Note: USA Hockey did not release a poll in week 12.

== Awards and honors ==
Player	Award	Ref
Jakub Altrichter	CCHA All-Rookie Team	
