= Philip Fox =

Philip Fox or Phil Fox may refer to:

- Philip Fox (actor), English film and television actor
- Philip Fox (astronomer) (1878–1944), American astronomer and U.S. Army officer
- Phil Fox (born 1985), American ice hockey player
- Phil Fox (politician), American politician
- Philip Fox (discus thrower) (born 1913), runner-up at the 1942 USA Outdoor Track and Field Championships in the discus

== See also ==
- Philip Fox La Follette (1897–1965), American politician
