= 2021–22 Michigan Tech Huskies men's ice hockey season =

NCAA tournament, West Regional semifinal
- Conference: 2nd CCHA
- Home ice: MacInnes Student Ice Arena

Rankings
- USCHO: #14
- USA Today: #14

Record
- Overall: 21–13–3
- Conference: 16–8–2
- Home: 12–5–0
- Road: 9–7–3
- Neutral: 0–1–0

Coaches and captains
- Head coach: Joe Shawhan
- Assistant coaches: Chris Brooks; Tyler Shelast; Jamie Phillips
- Captain: Alec Broetzman
- Alternate captain(s): Trenton Bliss; Eric Gotz; Colin Swoyer

The 2021–22 Michigan Tech Huskies men's ice hockey season was the 101st season of play for the program and 4th in the Central Collegiate Hockey Association (CCHA). They represented Michigan Technological University, played their home games at MacInnes Student Ice Arena and were coached by Joe Shawhan, in his 5th season.

== Season ==
Michigan Tech joined with six other members of the WCHA to restart the CCHA for the 2021–22 season. The Huskies had a rocky start to their season; after sweeping their first weekend, the team lost at least one game in each of the next five weeks. While their opposition was nothing to sneeze at, Tech was unable to distance itself from the crowd and subsequently fell out of the polls. The cause for their inconsistent play was just as mercurial; some times the offense would not be able to get on track while at other times the goaltending wasn't quite up to par. One thing that did carry over from game to game was the defense, which did a tremendous job limiting the opposition's chances to the tune of less than 22 shots a game.

Near the end of November, the Huskies looked to be getting themselves in order when they swept two weekends sandwiched around a losing effort against Minnesota State. The improvement in their play enabled the team to get back into the polls and remain there even after a less-than-stellar Great Lakes Invitational.

Tech was limited to just 4 games in January, due to positive COVID-19 tests around the college hockey landscape, but the team used its time off to great effect and went on a winning streak when they finally got back onto the ice. Michigan Tech went 8–0–1 through mid-February and rose up to 14 in the polls. More importantly, the team got into the top 10 in the PairWise rankings, which would guarantee them a spot in the NCAA tournament. The strong play in the second half also put the Huskies in a position to win the regular season crown if it could sweep its final four games, however, after going into overtime twice against Ferris State, their longshot hopes were dashed.

In the first CCHA tournament in 9 years, the Huskies were again pressed by Ferris State, needing overtime in both contests. Their special teams play saved their season as MTU scored 2 power play goals, 1 shorthanded goal and on a penalty shot. Their offense continued to sputter in the semifinal but they were also let down by a defensive breakdown in the third that saw Bemidji State score three times in under 5 minutes. The loss dropped the Huskies to 12 in the PairWise but that was well within the margin for at-large teams and Tech made it back to the tournament for the first time in four years.

=== NCAA tournament ===
The Huskies received a #3 seed for the tournament but were a sizable underdog to Minnesota Duluth, who were coming off of their 4th-consecutive Frozen Four. Their chances in the game were dealt a serious blow just 3 minutes into the game when their leading scorer, and Hobey Baker Award finalist, Brian Halonen received a controversial major penalty for boarding and was ejected from the game. Afterwards the offense was never able to get on track; while Tech got several shots on goal, few were high-level scoring chances and the team were held off by a very strong Bulldog defense. The only saving grace for MTU was that Pietila kept them in the game and the Huskies were still just one shot away from tying the score entering the third period. As the offense tried to rise to the occasion, Eric Gotz lost the puck on a pass up the ice and the turnover was immediately fired into the Tech goal. The second Duluth goal took most of the energy out of the Huskies. While they did try to claw their way back late, they could never get the puck past Ryan Fanti and an empty-netter sealed their fate.

== Departures ==
Player	Position	Nationality	Cause
Carson Bantle	Forward	United States	Transferred to Wisconsin
T. J. Polglaze	Forward	United States	Transferred to St. Thomas
David Raisanen	Forward	United States	Left program (retired)
Greyson Reitmeier	Forward	Canada	Graduation (retired)
Tyler Rockwell	Defenseman	United States	Graduation (signed with Kalamazoo Wings)
Marcus Russell	Forward	United States	Graduation (signed with Pensacola Ice Flyers)
Cooper Watson	Defenseman	United States	Graduation (retired)

== Recruiting ==
Player	Position	Nationality	Age	Notes
Tyrone Bronte	Forward	Australia	22	Melbourne, AUS; transfer from Alabama–Huntsville
Grant Docter	Defenseman	United States	20	Golden Valley, MN
Michael Karow	Defenseman	United States	22	Green Bay, WI; graduate transfer from Boston College; selected 126th overall in 2017
Alex Nordstorm	Forward	United States	20	Hancock, MI
Marcus Pedersen	Forward	Sweden	20	Stockholm, SWE
Matthew Quercia	Forward	United States	22	Andover, MA; transfer from Boston University
Trevor Russell	Defenseman	United States	21	Old Hickory, TN
Levi Stauber	Forward	United States	21	Hermantown, MN

== Roster ==
As of August 30, 2021.

No.	Nat.	Player	Class	Pos	Height	Weight	DoB	Hometown	Previous team	NHL rights
2	(Canada)	Ryland Mosley	Sophomore	F	5' 11" (1.8 m)	185 lb (84 kg)	2000-02-15	Arnprior, Ontario	Carleton Place (CCHL)	—
3	(Canada)	Tyrell Buckley	Senior	D	6' 0" (1.83 m)	195 lb (88 kg)	1997-03-01	Penticton, British Columbia	Merritt (BCHL)	—
4	(United States)	Chris Lipe	Junior	D	6' 1" (1.85 m)	195 lb (88 kg)	1999-11-23	Rockford, Michigan	Dubuque (USHL)	—
5	(United States)	Brenden Datema	Junior	D	6' 5" (1.96 m)	220 lb (100 kg)	1999-03-18	Sterling Heights, Michigan	Amarillo (NAHL)	—
6	(United States)	Levi Stauber	Freshman	F	5' 11" (1.8 m)	170 lb (77 kg)	2000-01-16	Hermantown, Minnesota	Danbury (NAHL)	—
7	(United States)	Nick Nardella	Sophomore	F	5' 10" (1.78 m)	174 lb (79 kg)	1999-02-09	Rosemont, Illinois	Janesville (NAHL)	—
8	(United States)	Trevor Russell	Freshman	D	6' 2" (1.88 m)	187 lb (85 kg)	2000-02-02	Old Hickory, Tennessee	Aberdeen (NAHL)	—
9	(United States)	Tommy Parrottino	Senior	F	6' 0" (1.83 m)	170 lb (77 kg)	1998-03-03	Rochester Hills, Michigan	Youngstown (USHL)	—
10	(United States)	Jake Crespi	Junior	F	6' 0" (1.83 m)	190 lb (86 kg)	1998-12-10	Brighton, Michigan	Tri-City (USHL)	—
11	(United States)	Grant Docter	Freshman	D	5' 11" (1.8 m)	170 lb (77 kg)	2000-12-06	Golden Valley, Minnesota	Minnesota Wilderness (NAHL)	—
12	(United States)	Brian Halonen	Senior	F	6' 0" (1.83 m)	207 lb (94 kg)	1999-01-11	Delano, Minnesota	Des Moines (USHL)	—
13	(United States)	Logan Pietila	Junior	F	5' 11" (1.8 m)	165 lb (75 kg)	2000-01-27	Howell, Michigan	Dubuque (USHL)	—
14	(Canada)	Logan Ganie	Junior	F	5' 10" (1.78 m)	175 lb (79 kg)	1999-06-28	Irma, Alberta	Spruce Grove (AJHL)	—
15	(Canada)	Parker Saretsky	Junior	F	6' 0" (1.83 m)	175 lb (79 kg)	1999-04-23	Wainwright, Alberta	Spruce Grove (AJHL)	—
16	(Sweden)	Marcus Pedersen	Freshman	F	6' 3" (1.91 m)	187 lb (85 kg)	2001-05-25	Stockholm, Sweden	Malmö Redhawks J20 (J20 Nationell)	—
17	(United States)	Justin Misiak	Senior	F	5' 10" (1.78 m)	178 lb (81 kg)	1996-04-25	St. Clair Shores, Michigan	Austin (NAHL)	—
18	(United States)	Alex Nordstrom	Freshman	F	6' 0" (1.83 m)	165 lb (75 kg)	2000-11-15	Atlantic Mine, Michigan	Green Bay (USHL)	—
19	(United States)	Eric Gotz (A)	Senior	D	5' 10" (1.78 m)	181 lb (82 kg)	1998-04-23	Hermantown, Minnesota	Minnesota Wilderness (NAHL)	—
20	(Sweden)	Arvid Caderoth	Sophomore	F	6' 4" (1.93 m)	215 lb (98 kg)	2000-05-14	Askim, Sweden	Frölunda J20 (J20 SuperElit)	—
21	(United States)	Blais Richartz	Sophomore	F	6' 0" (1.83 m)	183 lb (83 kg)	2000-06-23	Menomonie, Wisconsin	Lincoln (USHL)	—
22	(United States)	Matthew Quercia	Senior	F	6' 3" (1.91 m)	203 lb (92 kg)	1999-02-24	Andover, Massachusetts	Boston University (HEA)	—
23	(United States)	Trenton Bliss (A)	Senior	F	6' 0" (1.83 m)	192 lb (87 kg)	1998-03-16	Appleton, Wisconsin	Green Bay (USHL)	—
24	(United States)	Colin Swoyer (A)	Senior	D	6' 0" (1.83 m)	185 lb (84 kg)	1998-03-31	Hinsdale, Illinois	Sioux Falls (USHL)	—
25	(United States)	Jed Pietila	Sophomore	D	6' 0" (1.83 m)	181 lb (82 kg)	1999-01-13	Howell, Michigan	Austin (NAHL)	—
26	(United States)	Michael Karow	Graduate	D	6' 2" (1.88 m)	210 lb (95 kg)	1998-12-18	Green Bay, Wisconsin	Boston College (HEA)	ARI, 126th overall 2017
27	(Canada)	Brett Thorne	Sophomore	D	6' 2" (1.88 m)	190 lb (86 kg)	1998-03-15	Bedford, Nova Scotia	Carleton Place (CCHL)	—
28	(United States)	Tristan Ashbrook	Junior	F	5' 11" (1.8 m)	175 lb (79 kg)	1998-07-16	Manistique, Michigan	RPI (ECAC)	—
29	(United States)	Alec Broetzman (C)	Senior	F	6' 0" (1.83 m)	200 lb (91 kg)	1997-02-05	Hudson, Wisconsin	Madison (USHL)	—
30	(Canada)	Mark Sinclair	Senior	G	6' 0" (1.83 m)	180 lb (82 kg)	1996-03-08	Dundas, Ontario	Alabama–Huntsville (WCHA)	—
31	(United States)	Blake Pietila	Junior	G	5' 11" (1.8 m)	164 lb (74 kg)	2000-01-27	Howell, Michigan	Cedar Rapids (USHL)	—
35	(United States)	Cayden Bailey	Sophomore	G	5' 11" (1.8 m)	181 lb (82 kg)	1999-09-21	Estero, Florida	Lone Star (NAHL)	—
55	(Australia)	Tyrone Bronte	Sophomore	F	5' 10" (1.78 m)	165 lb (75 kg)	1999-05-07	Melbourne, Australia	Alabama–Huntsville (WCHA)	—

== Standings ==
2021–22 Central Collegiate Hockey Association Standings
	Conference record										Overall record					
	GP	W	L	T	OTW	OTL	3/SW	PTS	GF	GA	GP	W	L	T	GF	GA
#2 Minnesota State †*	26	23	3	0	2	0	0	67	115	28	44	38	6	0	178	60
#14 Michigan Tech	26	16	8	2	2	4	0	54	93	53	37	21	13	3	118	75
Bemidji State	26	14	12	0	1	1	0	42	83	81	39	19	20	0	118	121
Lake Superior State	26	13	13	0	1	1	0	39	69	64	37	18	18	1	107	104
Northern Michigan	26	12	13	1	3	0	1	35	86	99	37	20	16	1	132	136
Bowling Green	26	11	14	1	2	1	0	33	67	87	37	15	19	3	94	119
Ferris State	26	9	16	1	2	2	0	28	66	99	36	11	24	1	90	135
St. Thomas	26	3	22	1	0	4	0	14	45	112	36	3	32	1	61	168
Championship: March 19, 2022 † indicates conference regular season champion (MacNaughton Cup) * indicates conference tournament champion (Mason Cup); Rankings: USCHO.com Top 20 Poll

== Schedule and results ==
Date	Time	Opponent^{#}	Rank^{#}	Site	TV	Decision	Result	Attendance	Record
Exhibition
October 2	3:04 PM	Northern Michigan*		MacInnes Student Ice Arena • Houghton, Michigan (Exhibition)			T 4–4		
Regular season
October 8	6:00 PM	at #13 Wisconsin*		Kohl Center • Madison, WI	BSW	Pietila	W 5–2	8,550	1–0–0
October 9	6:00 PM	at #13 Wisconsin*		Kohl Center • Madison, WI	BSW	Pietila	W 5–1	10,618	2–0–0
October 15	7:07 PM	#17 Notre Dame*	#16	MacInnes Student Ice Arena • Houghton, MI		Pietila	L 1–2 ^{OT}	3,899	2–1–0
October 16	6:07 PM	USNTDP*	#16	MacInnes Student Ice Arena • Houghton, MI (Exhibition)			L 1–2		
October 29	7:00 PM	at Clarkson*	#18	Cheel Arena • Potsdam, NY		Pietila	W 3–0	2,539	3–1–0
October 30	7:30 PM	at Clarkson*	#18	Cheel Arena • Potsdam, NY		Pietila	L 1–2	2,951	3–2–0
November 5	7:07 PM	Lake Superior State	#18	MacInnes Student Ice Arena • Houghton, MI		Pietila	L 2–3 ^{OT}	2,610	3–3–0 (0–1–0)
November 6	6:07 PM	Lake Superior State	#18	MacInnes Student Ice Arena • Houghton, MI		Pietila	W 2–0	2,429	4–3–0 (1–1–0)
November 12	7:07 PM	Northern Michigan		MacInnes Student Ice Arena • Houghton, MI (Rivalry)	Fox UP	Pietila	W 5–2	4,460	5–3–0 (2–1–0)
November 13	6:37 PM	at Northern Michigan		Berry Events Center • Marquette, MI (Rivalry)	Fox UP	Pietila	L 2–3 ^{OT}	3,847	5–4–0 (2–2–0)
November 19	8:07 PM	at #20 Bemidji State		Sanford Center • Bemidji, MN		Pietila	W 4–3	2,278	6–4–0 (3–2–0)
November 20	7:07 PM	at #20 Bemidji State		Sanford Center • Bemidji, MN		Pietila	L 3–4	2,142	6–5–0 (3–3–0)
November 26	7:07 PM	Ferris State		MacInnes Student Ice Arena • Houghton, MI		Pietila	W 6–4	1,894	7–5–0 (4–3–0)
November 27	6:07 PM	Ferris State		MacInnes Student Ice Arena • Houghton, MI		Pietila	W 6–1	1,982	8–5–0 (5–3–0)
December 3	8:07 PM	at #2 Minnesota State		Mayo Clinic Health System Event Center • Mankato, MN	CCMk–14	Pietila	L 1–2	4,522	8–6–0 (5–4–0)
December 4	7:07 PM	at #2 Minnesota State		Mayo Clinic Health System Event Center • Mankato, MN	CCMk–14	Pietila	L 1–3	4,494	8–7–0 (5–5–0)
December 10	7:07 PM	St. Thomas		MacInnes Student Ice Arena • Houghton, MI		Pietila	W 6–1	2,060	9–7–0 (6–5–0)
December 11	6:07 PM	St. Thomas		MacInnes Student Ice Arena • Houghton, MI		Pietila	W 4–3	2,589	10–7–0 (7–5–0)
Great Lakes Invitational
December 29	7:00 PM	at #3 Michigan*	#18	Yost Ice Arena • Ann Arbor, MI (Great Lakes Invitational)		Pietila	T 0–0 ^{OT}	5,800	10–7–1
December 30	5:00 PM	at Michigan State*	#18	Munn Ice Arena • East Lansing, MI (Great Lakes Invitational)		Pietila	L 2–3 ^{OT}	5,564	10–8–1
Regular season
January 14	7:07 PM	at Lake Superior State	#19	Taffy Abel Arena • Sault Ste. Marie, MI		Pietila	W 3–0	1,077	11–8–1 (8–5–0)
January 15	6:07 PM	at Lake Superior State	#19	Taffy Abel Arena • Sault Ste. Marie, MI		Pietila	W 3–0	1,175	12–8–1 (9–5–0)
January 28	7:07 PM	Bemidji State	#18	MacInnes Student Ice Arena • Houghton, MI		Pietila	W 5–2	2,043	13–8–1 (10–5–0)
January 29	6:07 PM	Bemidji State	#18	MacInnes Student Ice Arena • Houghton, MI		Pietila	W 5–2	2,333	14–8–1 (11–5–0)
February 1	6:07 PM	Northern Michigan	#15	MacInnes Student Ice Arena • Houghton, MI (Rivalry)	Fox UP	Pietila	W 5–1	2,744	15–8–1 (12–5–0)
February 4	8:07 PM	at St. Thomas	#15	St. Thomas Ice Arena • Mendota Heights, MN		Pietila	T 3–3 ^{SOW}	708	15–8–2 (12–5–1)
February 5	8:07 PM	at St. Thomas	#15	St. Thomas Ice Arena • Mendota Heights, MN		Pietila	W 2–0	790	16–8–2 (13–5–1)
February 8	6:37 PM	at Northern Michigan	#14	Berry Events Center • Marquette, MI (Rivalry)	Fox UP	Pietila	W 8–1	3,964	17–8–2 (14–5–1)
February 11	7:07 PM	Bowling Green	#14	MacInnes Student Ice Arena • Houghton, MI		Pietila	W 4–0	3,017	18–8–2 (15–5–1)
February 12	5:07 PM	Bowling Green	#14	MacInnes Student Ice Arena • Houghton, MI		Pietila	L 2–4	2,960	18–9–2 (15–6–1)
February 18	7:07 PM	at Ferris State	#14	Ewigleben Arena • Big Rapids, MI		Pietila	W 3–2 ^{OT}	1,901	19–9–2 (16–6–1)
February 19	6:07 PM	at Ferris State	#14	Ewigleben Arena • Big Rapids, MI		Sinclair	T 5–5 ^{SOW}	2,495	19–9–3 (16–6–2)
February 25	7:07 PM	#1 Minnesota State	#14	MacInnes Student Ice Arena • Houghton, MI		Pietila	L 1–2 ^{OT}	2,607	19–10–3 (16–7–2)
February 26	6:07 PM	#1 Minnesota State	#14	MacInnes Student Ice Arena • Houghton, MI		Pietila	L 1–2	2,736	19–11–3 (16–8–2)
CCHA tournament
March 4	7:07 PM	Ferris State*	#15	MacInnes Student Ice Arena • Houghton, MI (Quarterfinal game 1)		Pietila	W 3–2 ^{OT}	2,016	20–11–3
March 5	6:07 PM	Ferris State*	#15	MacInnes Student Ice Arena • Houghton, MI (Quarterfinal game 2)		Pietila	W 3–2 ^{2OT}	2,272	21–11–3
March 12	6:07 PM	Bemidji State*	#13	MacInnes Student Ice Arena • Houghton, MI (Semifinal)		Pietila	L 2–5	2,634	21–12–3
NCAA tournament
March 24	3:00 PM	vs. #6 Minnesota Duluth*	#14	Budweiser Events Center • Loveland, Colorado (West Regional semifinal)	ESPNU	Pietila	L 0–3	3,138	21–13–3
*Non-conference game. ^{#}Rankings from USCHO.com Poll. All times are in Eastern Time. Source:

== Scoring statistics ==
Name	Position	Games	Goals	Assists	Points	PIM
Brian Halonen	LW	37	21	23	44	49
Trenton Bliss	F	36	12	28	40	26
Tommy Parrottino	F	37	11	17	28	8
Logan Pietila	F	34	13	10	23	2
Colin Swoyer	D	36	5	18	23	22
Justin Misiak	C	33	5	14	19	12
Brett Thorne	D	37	5	12	17	31
Tristan Ashbrook	RW	37	11	5	16	8
Arvid Caderoth	C/RW	37	4	12	16	27
Alec Broetzman	LW	29	6	8	14	25
Rylan Mosley	LW	36	5	8	13	18
Eric Gotz	D	35	4	6	10	4
Michael Karow	D	37	2	8	10	26
Nicholas Nardella	F	29	1	7	8	6
Tyrell Buckley	D	33	1	7	8	22
Logan Ganie	LW	22	5	1	6	6
Parker Saretsky	F	29	2	4	6	8
Matthew Quercia	F	14	2	2	4	8
Tyrone Bronte	C	27	1	2	3	6
Christopher Lipe	D	34	0	3	3	6
Jake Crespi	RW	21	1	1	2	2
Blake Pietila	G	37	0	2	2	0
Mark Sinclair	G	3	0	1	1	0
Grant Docter	D	6	0	1	1	4
Brenden Datema	D	2	0	0	0	0
Cayden Bailey	G	3	0	0	0	0
Blais Richartz	F	4	0	0	0	0
Trevor Russell	D	18	0	0	0	2
Total			117	200	317	340

== Goaltending statistics ==
Name	Games	Minutes	Wins	Losses	Ties	Goals against	Saves	Shut outs	SV %	GAA
Cayden Bailey	3	3:28	0	0	0	0	1	0	1.000	0.00
Blake Pietila	37	2195	21	13	2	70	779	7	.918	1.91
Mark Sinclair	3	60	0	0	1	2	19	0	.905	1.97
Empty Net	-	17	-	-	-	3	-	-	-	-
Total	37	2276	21	13	3	75	799	7	.914	1.98

== Rankings ==
Poll	Week																									
Poll	Pre	1	2	3	4	5	6	7	8	9	10	11	12	13	14	15	16	17	18	19	20	21	22	23	24	25 (Final)
USCHO.com	NR	NR	16	18	18	18	NR	NR	NR	NR	NR	18	20	19	17	18	15	14	14	14	15	13	15	14	-	14
USA Today	NR	NR	NR	NR	NR	NR	NR	NR	NR	NR	NR	NR	NR	NR	NR	NR	14	14	13	13	15	13	14	14	14	14

Note: USCHO did not release a poll in week 24.

== Awards and honors ==
Player	Award	Ref
Brian Halonen	AHCA All-American West First Team	
Brian Halonen	CCHA First Team	
Blake Pietila	CCHA Second Team	
Colin Swoyer	CCHA Second Team	
Trenton Bliss	CCHA Second Team	
