= 2021–22 St. Thomas (Minnesota) Tommies men's ice hockey season =

2021–22 St. Thomas Tommies men's ice hockey season
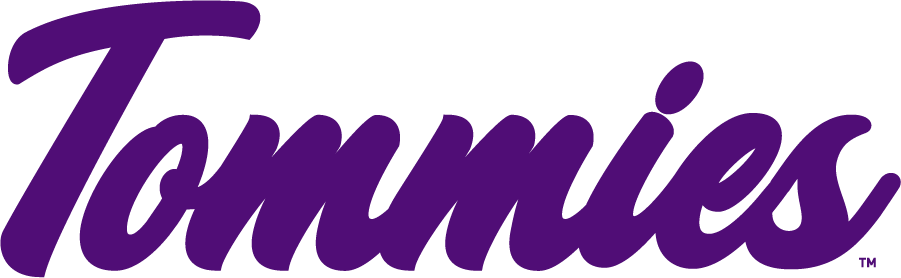
- Conference: 8th CCHA
- Home ice: St. Thomas Ice Arena

Rankings
- USCHO: NR
- USA Today: NR

Record
- Overall: 3–32–1
- Conference: 3–22–1
- Home: 2–10–1
- Road: 1–22–0

Coaches and captains
- Head coach: Enrico Blasi
- Assistant coaches: Leon Hayward; Cory Laylin

The 2021–22 St. Thomas Tommies men's ice hockey season was the 98th season of play for the program, the 1st in Division I and the 1st season in the CCHA conference. The Tommies represented the University of St. Thomas (Minnesota) and were coached by Enrico Blasi, in his 1st season.

== Season ==
St. Thomas began its first season at the Division I level knowing that it wasn't expected to compete with many of its new opponents. While the roster was full of transfers from other D-I programs, few had been high-level players. The Tommies began their season with a bad if unsurprising 2–12 loss to the defending national runner-up, St. Cloud State. The second game, even though it too was a loss, was a much closer affair and demonstrated that St. Thomas could at least rise to the level of play.

While the Tommies started the season 0–7, there were a few close games and the team finally broke through with its first D-I win in late October. After the victory, the St. Thomas offense went dormant for several months, only once scoring more than 2 goals until mid-January. The 15-game losing streak that resulted made it very difficult for St. Thomas to do anything but finish last in the CCHA standings.

The scoring picked up slightly in the later part of the season, and the Tommies were able to get two more wins before the season was out, but it was hardly a shock when St. Thomas was ranked as the worst team at the Division I level by season's end.

== Departures ==
Player	Position	Nationality	Cause
Tucker Bender	Defenseman	United States	Graduation (retired)
Jackson Bond	Forward	United States	Transferred to Hamline
Chris Conway	Defenseman	United States	Left program (retired)
Lewis Crosby	Forward	United States	Transferred to Saint John's
Phil Fromberger	Defenseman	Canada	Graduation (retired)
Will Graves	Goaltender	United States	Left program (retired)
Kyle Gudme	Defenseman	United States	Left program (retired)
Sam Huff	Forward	United States	Left program (retired)
Charlie Kiefer	Defenseman	United States	Left program (retired)
Ian Mageau	Forward	United States	Left program (retired)
Josh Maucieri	Forward	United States	Transferred to Saint John's
Austin Nault	Forward	Canada	Transferred to Marian
Josh Norman	Forward	United States	Transferred to Lake Forest
Max Osborne	Defenseman	United States	Transferred to Saint John's
John Pesek	Defenseman	United States	Left program (retired)
Jake Peterson	Defenseman	United States	Left program (retired)
Luke Radetic	Forward	United States	Left program (retired)
Zac Risteau	Forward	United States	Left program (retired)
John Serafin	Defenseman	United States	Transferred to Endicott
Anthony Szurlej	Defenseman	United States	Left program (retired)
Jack Vincent	Forward	United States	Left program (retired)
Spencer Zwiener	Forward	United States	Graduation (retired)

== Recruiting ==
Player	Position	Nationality	Age	Notes
Michael Ferrandino	Defenseman	United States	21	Lisle, IL
Ethan Gauer	Defenseman	United States	21	Farmington, MN; transfer from Bemidji State
Kyler Grundy	Forward	United States	21	Pleasant Prairie, WI
Matthew Jennings	Forward	United States	24	Buford, GA; transfer from Ohio State
Trevor LeDonne	Defenseman	Canada	18	Stoney Creek, ON
Tim Piechowski	Forward	United States	20	Eden Prairie, MN
Cameron Recchi	Forward	United States	20	Pittsburgh, PA
Sam Renlund	Forward	United States	21	Verona, WI; transfer from Colorado College
Nolan Sawchuk	Defenseman	United States	23	Burnsville, MN; transfer from Massachusetts Lowell
Paul Schmid	Forward	Austria	21	Linz, AUT
John Schuldt	Defenseman	United States	24	Minnetonka, MN; transfer from Omaha
Peter Thome	Goaltender	United States	24	Minneapolis, MN; graduate transfer from North Dakota; selected 155th overall in 2016
Christiano Versich	Forward	United States	24	Saint Paul, MN; transfer from Colorado College
Blaine Warnert	Forward	United States	21	Chaska, MN
Trevor Zins	Defenseman	United States	21	St. Michael, MN; transfer from St. Cloud State

== Roster ==
As of September 9, 2021.

No.	Nat.	Player	Class	Pos	Height	Weight	DoB	Hometown	Previous team	NHL rights
1	(United States)	Peter Thome	Graduate	G	6' 4" (1.93 m)	198 lb (90 kg)	1997-05-24	Minneapolis, Minnesota	North Dakota (NCHC)	CBJ, 155th overall 2016
2	(United States)	Trevor Zins	Junior	D	6' 1" (1.85 m)	195 lb (88 kg)	1998-07-23	St. Michael, Minnesota	St. Cloud State (NCHC)	—
3	(United States)	Michael Ferrandino	Freshman	D	5' 10" (1.78 m)	180 lb (82 kg)	2000-03-17	Lisle, Illinois	Minnesota Magicians (NAHL)	—
4	(United States)	Nolan Sawchuk	Graduate	D	5' 11" (1.8 m)	185 lb (84 kg)	1997-09-25	Burnsville, Minnesota	Massachusetts Lowell (HEA)	—
5	(United States)	Vincent Weis	Sophomore	D	5' 8" (1.73 m)	175 lb (79 kg)	1999-06-04	Madison, Wisconsin	Madison Capitols (USHL)	—
8	(United States)	Cameron Recchi	Freshman	F	5' 10" (1.78 m)	165 lb (75 kg)	2001-05-24	Pittsburgh, Pennsylvania	Salmon Arm Silverbacks (BCHL)	—
9	(United States)	Matthew Jennings	Senior	F	5' 8" (1.73 m)	173 lb (78 kg)	1997-06-07	Buford, Georgia	Ohio State (Big Ten)	—
10	(United States)	Andrew Kangas	Junior	F	5' 9" (1.75 m)	185 lb (84 kg)	1998-01-28	Mahtomedi, Minnesota	Minot Minotauros (NAHL)	—
11	(United States)	Lucas McGregor	Sophomore	F	5' 11" (1.8 m)	170 lb (77 kg)	1999-09-08	Lino Lakes, Minnesota	Sioux Falls Stampede (USHL)	—
12	(United States)	Tim Piechowski	Freshman	F	6' 2" (1.88 m)	210 lb (95 kg)	2000-12-08	Eden Prairie, Minnesota	Bismarck Bobcats (NAHL)	—
14	(United States)	Shayne Monahan	Senior	D	6' 0" (1.83 m)	185 lb (84 kg)	1997-09-20	Lakeville, Minnesota	Syracuse Jr. Stars (NCDC)	—
15	(United States)	Grant Loven	Senior	F	5' 11" (1.8 m)	190 lb (86 kg)	1997-12-21	East Grand Forks, Minnesota	Northern Michigan (WCHA)	—
16	(United States)	Luke Manning	Junior	F	5' 10" (1.78 m)	190 lb (86 kg)	1999-04-13	Stillwater, Minnesota	Air Force (AHA)	—
17	(Austria)	Paul Schmid	Freshman	F	6' 1" (1.85 m)	187 lb (85 kg)	2000-06-10	Linz, Austria	Amarillo Bulls (NAHL)	—
18	(United States)	Ethan Gauer	Sophomore	D	6' 0" (1.83 m)	185 lb (84 kg)	1999-12-23	Farmington, Minnesota	Bemidji State (WCHA)	—
19	(United States)	Justin Kelley	Junior	F	6' 0" (1.83 m)	185 lb (84 kg)	1998-08-23	Maple Grove, Minnesota	Minot Minotauros (NAHL)	—
20	(United States)	Aaron Swanson	Sophomore	F	5' 10" (1.78 m)	180 lb (82 kg)	1999-05-10	Sun Prairie, Wisconsin	Maryland Black Bears (NAHL)	—
21	(United States)	Joey Sofo	Senior	F	5' 10" (1.78 m)	185 lb (84 kg)	1996-08-07	Sylvania, Ohio	Alaska Anchorage (WCHA)	—
22	(United States)	John Schuldt	Graduate	D	6' 4" (1.93 m)	216 lb (98 kg)	1997-02-10	Minnetonka, Minnesota	Omaha (NCHC)	—
23	(Canada)	Trevor LeDonne	Freshman	D	6' 1" (1.85 m)	195 lb (88 kg)	2000-02-27	Stoney Creek, Ontario	Nanaimo Clippers (BCHL)	—
24	(United States)	Logan Ommen	Freshman	F	5' 9" (1.75 m)	175 lb (79 kg)	1999-07-25	Bolingbrook, Illinois	Corpus Christi IceRays (NAHL)	—
26	(United States)	Blaine Warnert	Freshman	F	6' 5" (1.96 m)	190 lb (86 kg)	2000-07-17	Chaska, Minnesota	Minot Minotauros (NAHL)	—
27	(United States)	Kyler Grundy	Freshman	F	6' 1" (1.85 m)	190 lb (86 kg)	2000-04-19	Pleasant Prairie, Wisconsin	Green Bay Gamblers (USHL)	—
28	(United States)	Kimball Johnson	Sophomore	D	6' 0" (1.83 m)	185 lb (84 kg)	1999-06-23	Coppell, Texas	Minnesota Wilderness (NAHL)	—
29	(United States)	Christiano Versich	Graduate	F	5' 8" (1.73 m)	176 lb (80 kg)	1997-01-02	Kelly Lake, Minnesota	Colorado College (NCHC)	—
31	(United States)	Jacob Berger	Senior	G	5' 11" (1.8 m)	165 lb (75 kg)	1997-07-01	Minnetonka, Minnesota	Minnesota State (WCHA)	—
35	(United States)	Henry Baribeau	Junior	G	6' 3" (1.91 m)	190 lb (86 kg)	1998-10-15	Hudson, Wisconsin	New Ulm Steel (NA3HL)	—
39	(United States)	Sam Renlund	Sophomore	F	5' 11" (1.8 m)	190 lb (86 kg)	2000-04-04	Verona, Wisconsin	Des Moines Buccaneers (USHL)	—

== Standings ==
2021–22 Central Collegiate Hockey Association Standings
	Conference record										Overall record					
	GP	W	L	T	OTW	OTL	3/SW	PTS	GF	GA	GP	W	L	T	GF	GA
#2 Minnesota State †*	26	23	3	0	2	0	0	67	115	28	44	38	6	0	178	60
#14 Michigan Tech	26	16	8	2	2	4	0	54	93	53	37	21	13	3	118	75
Bemidji State	26	14	12	0	1	1	0	42	83	81	39	19	20	0	118	121
Lake Superior State	26	13	13	0	1	1	0	39	69	64	37	18	18	1	107	104
Northern Michigan	26	12	13	1	3	0	1	35	86	99	37	20	16	1	132	136
Bowling Green	26	11	14	1	2	1	0	33	67	87	37	15	19	3	94	119
Ferris State	26	9	16	1	2	2	0	28	66	99	36	11	24	1	90	135
St. Thomas	26	3	22	1	0	4	0	14	45	112	36	3	32	1	61	168
Championship: March 19, 2022 † indicates conference regular season champion (MacNaughton Cup) * indicates conference tournament champion (Mason Cup); Rankings: USCHO.com Top 20 Poll

== Schedule and results ==
Date	Time	Opponent^{#}	Rank^{#}	Site	TV	Decision	Result	Attendance	Record
Regular season
October 2	6:07 PM	at #2 St. Cloud State*		Herb Brooks National Hockey Center • St. Cloud, Minnesota		Thome	L 2–12	4,151	0–1–0
October 3	4:37 PM	#2 St. Cloud State*		Xcel Energy Center • St. Paul, Minnesota		Thome	L 0–2	4,261	0–2–0
October 8	5:37 PM	at Northern Michigan		Berry Events Center • Marquette, Michigan		Thome	L 1–4	2,532	0–3–0 (0–1–0)
October 9	5:37 PM	at Northern Michigan		Berry Events Center • Marquette, Michigan		Thome	L 3–8	3,080	0–4–0 (0–2–0)
October 15	6:07 PM	at Lake Superior State		Taffy Abel Arena • Sault Ste. Marie, Michigan		Berger	L 1–3	0	0–5–0 (0–3–0)
October 16	5:07 PM	at Lake Superior State		Taffy Abel Arena • Sault Ste. Marie, Michigan		Thome	L 3–6	1,646	0–6–0 (0–4–0)
October 22	7:07 PM	Ferris State		St. Thomas Ice Arena • Mendota Heights, Minnesota		Thome	L 1–2 ^{OT}	0	0–7–0 (0–5–0)
October 23	7:07 PM	Ferris State		St. Thomas Ice Arena • Mendota Heights, Minnesota		Thome	W 5–2	0	1–7–0 (1–5–0)
October 29	6:05 PM	at Arizona State*		Oceanside Ice Arena • Tempe, Arizona		Thome	L 2–5	0	1–8–0
October 30	6:05 PM	at Arizona State*		Oceanside Ice Arena • Tempe, Arizona		Berger	L 2–5	900	1–9–0
November 5	6:07 PM	at Bowling Green		Slater Family Ice Arena • Bowling Green, Ohio		Thome	L 2–4	1,676	1–10–0 (1–6–0)
November 6	6:07 PM	at Bowling Green		Slater Family Ice Arena • Bowling Green, Ohio		Thome	L 0–3	1,811	1–11–0 (1–7–0)
November 18	7:07 PM	at #3 Minnesota State		Mayo Clinic Health System Event Center • Mankato, Minnesota	CCMk–14	Thome	L 0–9	3,875	1–12–0 (1–8–0)
November 20	7:07 PM	#3 Minnesota State		St. Thomas Ice Arena • Mendota Heights, Minnesota		Thome	L 0–5	885	1–13–0 (1–9–0)
November 23	7:07 PM	at Penn State*		St. Thomas Ice Arena • Mendota Heights, Minnesota		Berger	L 1–5	559	1–14–0
November 24	7:07 PM	at Penn State*		St. Thomas Ice Arena • Mendota Heights, Minnesota		Berger	L 1–4	544	1–15–0
December 3	7:07 PM	Bemidji State		St. Thomas Ice Arena • Mendota Heights, Minnesota		Thome	L 2–5	664	1–16–0 (1–10–0)
December 4	7:07 PM	Bemidji State		St. Thomas Ice Arena • Mendota Heights, Minnesota		Thome	L 1–6	567	1–17–0 (1–11–0)
December 10	6:07 PM	at Michigan Tech		MacInnes Student Ice Arena • Houghton, Michigan		Thome	L 1–6	2,060	1–18–0 (1–12–0)
December 11	5:07 PM	at Michigan Tech		MacInnes Student Ice Arena • Houghton, Michigan		Berger	L 3–4	2,589	1–19–0 (1–13–0)
January 7	7:07 PM	Bowling Green		St. Thomas Ice Arena • Mendota Heights, Minnesota		Thome	L 2–4	504	1–20–0 (1–14–0)
January 8	7:07 PM	Bowling Green		St. Thomas Ice Arena • Mendota Heights, Minnesota		Berger	L 1–2 ^{OT}	540	1–21–0 (1–15–0)
January 14	6:07 PM	at Ferris State		Ewigleben Arena • Big Rapids, Michigan		Thome	L 1–3	1,647	1–22–0 (1–16–0)
January 15	5:07 PM	at Ferris State		Ewigleben Arena • Big Rapids, Michigan		Thome	W 4–3	1,749	2–22–0 (2–16–0)
January 20	7:07 PM	#2 Minnesota State		St. Thomas Ice Arena • Mendota Heights, Minnesota		Berger	L 1–5	684	2–23–0 (2–17–0)
January 22	7:07 PM	at #2 Minnesota State		Blakeslee Stadium • Mankato, Minnesota (Hockey Day Minnesota)	BSN	Thome	L 1–7	-	2–24–0 (2–18–0)
February 4	7:07 PM	#15 Michigan Tech		St. Thomas Ice Arena • Mendota Heights, Minnesota		Thome	T 3–3 ^{SOL}	708	2–24–1 (2–18–1)
February 5	7:07 PM	#15 Michigan Tech		St. Thomas Ice Arena • Mendota Heights, Minnesota		Thome	L 0–2	790	2–25–1 (2–19–1)
February 11	10:07 PM	at Alaska*		Carlson Center • Fairbanks, Alaska		Thome	L 1–6	1,650	2–26–1
February 12	10:07 PM	at Alaska*		Carlson Center • Fairbanks, Alaska		Berger	L 3–7	1,738	2–27–1
February 18	7:07 PM	Lake Superior State		St. Thomas Ice Arena • Mendota Heights, Minnesota		Thome	W 2–1	643	3–27–1 (3–19–1)
February 19	7:07 PM	Lake Superior State		St. Thomas Ice Arena • Mendota Heights, Minnesota		Thome	L 1–5	521	3–28–1 (3–20–1)
February 25	7:07 PM	at Bemidji State		Sanford Center • Bemidji, Minnesota		Thome	L 3–5	2,275	3–29–1 (3–21–1)
February 26	6:07 PM	at Bemidji State		Sanford Center • Bemidji, Minnesota		Thome	L 3–4 ^{OT}	2,112	3–30–1 (3–22–1)
CCHA Tournament
March 4	7:07 PM	at #1 Minnesota State*		Mayo Clinic Health System Event Center • Mankato, Minnesota (Quarterfinal game 1)		Thome	L 2–3	3,351	3–31–1
March 5	6:07 PM	at #1 Minnesota State*		Mayo Clinic Health System Event Center • Mankato, Minnesota (Quarterfinal game 2)		Thome	L 2–8	3,627	3–32–1
St. Thomas Lost Series 0–2
*Non-conference game. ^{#}Rankings from USCHO.com Poll. All times are in Central Time. Source:

== Scoring statistics ==
Name	Position	Games	Goals	Assists	Points	PIM
Christiano Versich	RW	31	5	11	16	8
Luke Manning	C	36	8	7	15	12
Matt Jennings	C	35	4	11	15	24
Cameron Recchi	C/LW	35	5	8	13	14
Kyler Grundy	F	31	7	5	12	14
Grant Loven	C	35	7	5	12	18
Trevor Zins	D	35	3	8	11	18
Tim Piechowski	RW	32	5	5	10	8
Nolan Sawchuk	D	36	1	9	10	10
Joe Sofo	F	24	3	6	9	2
Kimball Johnson	D	23	2	6	8	12
Ethan Gauer	D	32	2	5	7	26
Blaine Warnert	F	26	2	1	3	8
Sam Renlund	F	7	1	2	3	10
Lucas McGregor	F	13	1	2	3	4
Trevor LeDonne	D	27	1	2	3	26
John Schuldt	D	32	1	2	3	51
Andrew Kangas	F	33	1	2	3	10
Aaron Swanson	F	34	2	0	2	43
Logan Ommen	F	9	0	2	2	2
Justin Kelley	F	18	0	1	1	2
Vincent Weis	D	21	0	1	1	22
Paul Schmid	F	25	0	1	1	11
Michael Ferrandino	D	26	0	1	1	0
Henry Baribeau	G	2	0	0	0	0
Shayne Monahan	D	13	0	0	0	8
Jacob Berger	G	17	0	0	0	0
Peter Thome	G	29	0	0	0	0
Bench	-	-	-	-	-	2
Total			61	101	162	367

== Goaltending statistics ==
Name	Games	Minutes	Wins	Losses	Ties	Goals against	Saves	Shut outs	SV %	GAA
Henry Baribeau	2	3:13	0	0	0	0	1	0	1.000	0.00
Jacob Berger	17	644	0	8	0	44	293	0	.869	4.10
Peter Thome	29	1522	3	24	1	115	811	0	.876	4.53
Empty Net	-	18	-	-	-	9	-	-	-	-
Total	36	2168	3	32	1	168	1107	0	.868	4.65

== Rankings ==
Poll	Week																									
Poll	Pre	1	2	3	4	5	6	7	8	9	10	11	12	13	14	15	16	17	18	19	20	21	22	23	24	25 (Final)
USCHO.com	NR	NR	NR	NR	NR	NR	NR	NR	NR	NR	NR	NR	NR	NR	NR	NR	NR	NR	NR	NR	NR	NR	NR	NR	-	NR
USA Today	NR	NR	NR	NR	NR	NR	NR	NR	NR	NR	NR	NR	NR	NR	NR	NR	NR	NR	NR	NR	NR	NR	NR	NR	NR	NR

Note: USCHO did not release a poll in week 24.
