= 2021–22 Bowling Green Falcons men's ice hockey season =

- Conference: 6th CCHA
- Home ice: Slater Family Ice Arena

Rankings
- USCHO: NR
- USA Today: NR

Record
- Overall: 15–19–3
- Conference: 11–14–1
- Home: 7–7–0
- Road: 7–11–3
- Neutral: 1–1–0

Coaches and captains
- Head coach: Ty Eigner
- Assistant coaches: Curtis Carr; Stavros Paskaris

The 2021–22 Bowling Green Falcons men's ice hockey season was the 53rd season of play for the program and the 43rd season in the Central Collegiate Hockey Association. The Falcons represented Bowling Green State University and were led by third-year head coach Ty Eigner.

== Season ==
Bowling Green joined with six other members of the WCHA to restart the CCHA for the 2021–22 season. Before the CCHA resumed play, an eighth member, former NCAA Division III member St. Thomas, joined the league.

After narrowly missing out on the NCAA tournament the year before, Bowling Green got a good start to the season, going undefeated through their first five games. The Falcons ran into a bit of trouble when they started playing ranked teams, losing 7 consecutive games against top-20 opponents. The losses didn't put Bowling Green in good standing with the rankings and the Falcons remained unlikely to earn a berth despite getting up to a 13–9–3 record.

In the last nine games, however, the team's offense all but vanished and the Falcons went 1–8 to end the regular season. Despite all the momentum moving against them, Bowling Green managed to win the first game in the playoff series against Bemidji State. Unfortunately, they weren't able to repeat the performance and their season ended on a down note.

== Departures ==
Player	Position	Nationality	Cause
Will Cullen	Defenseman	United States	Transferred to Miami
Eric Dop	Goaltender	United States	Graduate transfer to Boston College
Connor Ford	Forward	United States	Graduate transfer to North Dakota
Gavin Gould	Forward	Canada	Graduation (signed with Greenville Swamp Rabbits)
Max Johnson	Forward	United States	Graduate transfer to Wisconsin
Brandon Kruse	Forward	United States	Graduate transfer to Boston College
Carson Musser	Defenseman	United States	Graduate transfer to Long Island
Brett Rich	Goaltender	United States	Graduation (retired)
Tim Theocharidis	Defenseman	Canada	Transfer to Arizona State
Justin Wells	Defenseman	United States	Graduate transfer to Boston College
Cameron Wright	Forward	Canada	Graduate transfer to Denver

== Recruiting ==
Player	Position	Nationality	Age	Notes
Nathan Burke	Forward	United States	22	Scottsdale, AZ; transfer from Minnesota
Gabriel Chicoine	Defenseman	Canada	24	Saint-Dominique, QC; transfer from Norwich
Brayden Krieger	Forward	Canada	20	Elora, ON
Coale Norris	Forward	United States	24	Oxford, MI; graduate transfer from Ferris State
Ryan O'Hara	Defenseman	Canada	20	Calgary, AB
Spencer Schneider	Forward	United States	21	Lakeville, MN; transfer from Norwich
Christian Stoever	Goaltender	United States	21	Northville, MI
Austen Swankler	Forward	United States	20	North Huntingdon, PA
Ben Wozney	Defenseman	Canada	20	Richmond, BC

== Roster ==
As of August 20, 2021.

No.	Nat.	Player	Class	Pos	Height	Weight	DoB	Hometown	Previous team	NHL rights
2	(Canada)	Ben Wozney	Freshman	D	6' 2" (1.88 m)	174 lb (79 kg)	2001-06-15	Richmond, British Columbia	Penticton Vees (BCHL)	—
4	(United States)	Garrett Daly	Junior	D	6' 0" (1.83 m)	195 lb (88 kg)	1999-08-11	Lakeville, Minnesota	Langley Rivermen (BCHL)	—
5	(United States)	Cam Babiak	Junior	D	6' 0" (1.83 m)	190 lb (86 kg)	1999-04-30	Saline, Michigan	Brookings Blizzard (NAHL)	—
6	(United States)	Alex Barber (A)	Senior	F	5' 10" (1.78 m)	150 lb (68 kg)	1999-02-17	Dublin, Ohio	Central Illinois Flying Aces (USHL)	—
7	(Canada)	T. J. Lloyd	Junior	D	5' 9" (1.75 m)	172 lb (78 kg)	1999-11-15	Lloydminster, Saskatchewan	Spruce Grove Saints (AJHL)	—
8	(Canada)	Chrystopher Collin	Sophomore	F	5' 11" (1.8 m)	172 lb (78 kg)	1999-05-05	Montreal, Quebec	Edmundston Blizzard (MHL)	—
10	(United States)	Nathan Burke	Senior	F	6' 2" (1.88 m)	190 lb (86 kg)	1998-12-21	Scottsdale, Arizona	Minnesota (Big Ten)	—
11	(United States)	Taylor Schneider	Senior	F	6' 1" (1.85 m)	161 lb (73 kg)	1998-02-18	Lakeville, Minnesota	Dubuque Fighting Saints (USHL)	—
12	(United States)	Austen Swankler	Freshman	F	6' 0" (1.83 m)	185 lb (84 kg)	2001-08-21	North Huntingdon, Pennsylvania	Erie Otters (OHL)	—
13	(United States)	Adam Conquest	Junior	F	6' 0" (1.83 m)	190 lb (86 kg)	2000-05-10	Brighton, Michigan	Cowichan Valley Capitals (BCHL)	—
14	(United States)	Coale Norris	Senior	F	6' 2" (1.88 m)	200 lb (91 kg)	1997-05-25	Oxford, Michigan	Ferris State (WCHA)	—
15	(United States)	Evan Dougherty	Senior	F	6' 0" (1.83 m)	182 lb (83 kg)	1999-04-17	Kalamazoo, Michigan	Waterloo Black Hawks (USHL)	—
16	(Canada)	Brayden Krieger	Freshman	F	6' 0" (1.83 m)	160 lb (73 kg)	2001-02-09	Elora, Ontario	Brooks Bandits (AJHL)	—
17	(Canada)	Ethan Scardina	Sophomore	F	6' 1" (1.85 m)	192 lb (87 kg)	2000-11-02	South Surrey, British Columbia	Nanaimo Clippers (BCHL)	—
18	(United States)	Trevor St-Jean	Senior	F	5' 8" (1.73 m)	173 lb (78 kg)	1997-10-10	Findlay, Ohio	Langley Rivermen (BCHL)	—
20	(Canada)	Ryan O'Hara	Freshman	F	5' 10" (1.78 m)	175 lb (79 kg)	2001-07-18	Oakville, Ontario	Waterloo Black Hawks (USHL)	—
21	(Canada)	Seth Fyten	Sophomore	F	6' 2" (1.88 m)	187 lb (85 kg)	2000-11-23	Didsbury, Alberta	Spruce Grove Saints (AJHL)	—
22	(United States)	Adam Pitters	Junior	F	5' 11" (1.8 m)	180 lb (82 kg)	1999-02-09	Grosse Pointe, Michigan	Aberdeen Wings (NAHL)	—
23	(Canada)	Max Coyle	Junior	D	6' 1" (1.85 m)	195 lb (88 kg)	1998-01-29	Tillsonburg, Ontario	Alabama Huntsville (WCHA)	—
24	(Canada)	Eric Parker	Freshman	D	6' 2" (1.88 m)	185 lb (84 kg)	2001-01-15	Calgary, Alberta	Okotoks Oilers (AJHL)	—
25	(United States)	Sam Craggs	Senior	F	6' 1" (1.85 m)	200 lb (91 kg)	1997-05-30	Elmhurst, Illinois	Waterloo Black Hawks (USHL)	—
26	(Canada)	Gabriel Chicoine	Senior	F	5' 11" (1.8 m)	175 lb (79 kg)	1997-02-05	Saint-Dominique, Quebec	Norwich (NEHC)	—
27	(United States)	Spencer Schneider	Freshman	F	6' 0" (1.83 m)	190 lb (86 kg)	2000-09-11	Lakeville, Minnesota	Aberdeen Wings (NAHL)	—
29	(United States)	Chase Danol	Junior	F	6' 1" (1.85 m)	195 lb (88 kg)	1999-01-20	Westland, Michigan	Coquitlam Express (BCHL)	—
30	(United States)	Christian Stoever	Freshman	G	6' 3" (1.91 m)	175 lb (79 kg)	2000-04-16	Northville, Michigan	New Jersey Titant (NAHL)	—
31	(United States)	Peter Eigner	Freshman	G	6' 1" (1.85 m)	190 lb (86 kg)	2002-05-04	Bowling Green, Ohio	Tri-State (Midget AAA)	—
33	(Sweden)	Anton Malmström	Sophomore	D	6' 4" (1.93 m)	203 lb (92 kg)	2000-03-18	Österhaninge, Sweden	Djurgården J20 (J20 SuperElit)	—
40	(Canada)	Zack Rose	Junior	G	6' 1" (1.85 m)	185 lb (84 kg)	1999-07-03	Paradise, Newfoundland and Labrador	Victoria Grizzlies (BCHL)	—

== Standings ==
2021–22 Central Collegiate Hockey Association Standings
	Conference record										Overall record					
	GP	W	L	T	OTW	OTL	3/SW	PTS	GF	GA	GP	W	L	T	GF	GA
#2 Minnesota State †*	26	23	3	0	2	0	0	67	115	28	44	38	6	0	178	60
#14 Michigan Tech	26	16	8	2	2	4	0	54	93	53	37	21	13	3	118	75
Bemidji State	26	14	12	0	1	1	0	42	83	81	39	19	20	0	118	121
Lake Superior State	26	13	13	0	1	1	0	39	69	64	37	18	18	1	107	104
Northern Michigan	26	12	13	1	3	0	1	35	86	99	37	20	16	1	132	136
Bowling Green	26	11	14	1	2	1	0	33	67	87	37	15	19	3	94	119
Ferris State	26	9	16	1	2	2	0	28	66	99	36	11	24	1	90	135
St. Thomas	26	3	22	1	0	4	0	14	45	112	36	3	32	1	61	168
Championship: March 19, 2022 † indicates conference regular season champion (MacNaughton Cup) * indicates conference tournament champion (Mason Cup); Rankings: USCHO.com Top 20 Poll

== Schedule and results ==
Date	Time	Opponent^{#}	Rank^{#}	Site	TV	Decision	Result	Attendance	Record
Exhibition
October 2	7:00 PM	at #3 Michigan*		Yost Ice Arena • Ann Arbor, Michigan (Exhibition)		Rose	L 1–7	5,407	
Regular Season
October 8	7:00 PM	at Rensselaer*		Houston Field House • Troy, New York		Rose	T 2–2 ^{OT}	484	0–0–1
October 9	7:00 PM	at Rensselaer*		Houston Field House • Troy, New York		Rose	W 3–2 ^{OT}	361	1–0–1
October 22	7:05 PM	at Miami*		Steve Cady Arena • Oxford, Ohio		Rose	T 2–2 ^{OT}	3,209	1–0–2
October 23	7:07 PM	Miami*		Slater Family Ice Arena • Bowling Green, Ohio		Rose	W 6–4	2,486	2–0–2
October 29	8:07 PM	at #17 Bemidji State		Sanford Center • Bemidji, Minnesota		Rose	W 3–2	2,402	3–0–2 (1–0–0)
October 30	7:07 PM	at #17 Bemidji State		Sanford Center • Bemidji, Minnesota		Stoever	L 1–2	2,304	3–1–2 (1–1–0)
November 5	7:07 PM	St. Thomas		Slater Family Ice Arena • Bowling Green, Ohio		Rose	W 4–2	1,676	4–1–2 (2–1–0)
November 6	7:07 PM	St. Thomas		Slater Family Ice Arena • Bowling Green, Ohio		Stoever	W 3–0	1,811	5–1–2 (3–1–0)
November 12	8:07 PM	at #3 Minnesota State		Mayo Clinic Health System Event Center • Mankato, Minnesota	CCMk–14	Rose	L 2–9	4,260	5–2–2 (3–2–0)
November 13	7:07 PM	at #3 Minnesota State		Mayo Clinic Health System Event Center • Mankato, Minnesota	CCMk–14	Stoever	L 3–5	4,187	5–3–2 (3–3–0)
November 19	7:07 PM	Lake Superior State		Slater Family Ice Arena • Bowling Green, Ohio		Rose	W 5–1	2,561	6–3–2 (4–3–0)
November 20	7:07 PM	Lake Superior State		Slater Family Ice Arena • Bowling Green, Ohio		Stoever	W 6–2	2,625	7–3–2 (5–3–0)
November 26	6:37 PM	at Northern Michigan		Berry Events Center • Marquette, Michigan		Rose	L 3–6	2,053	7–4–2 (5–4–0)
November 27	6:37 PM	at Northern Michigan		Berry Events Center • Marquette, Michigan		Stoever	T 3–3 ^{SOL}	2,107	7–4–3 (5–4–1)
December 10	7:07 PM	Ferris State		Slater Family Ice Arena • Bowling Green, Ohio		Rose	L 3–6	2,392	7–5–3 (5–5–1)
December 11	7:07 PM	Ferris State		Slater Family Ice Arena • Bowling Green, Ohio		Stoever	W 2–1	2,302	8–5–3 (6–5–1)
December 16	7:00 PM	at #17 Ohio State*		Value City Arena • Columbus, Ohio	BTN	Stoever	L 3–4 ^{OT}	5,232	8–6–3
December 17	7:07 PM	#17 Ohio State*		Slater Family Ice Arena • Bowling Green, Ohio		Stoever	L 2–3	5,000	8–7–3
Holiday Face–Off
December 28	5:07 PM	vs. #16 Providence*		Fiserv Forum • Milwaukee, Wisconsin (Face–Off Semifinal)	BSD, BSN, BSO, BSW	Stoever	L 2–6	-	8–8–3
December 29	5:07 PM	vs. Yale*		Fiserv Forum • Milwaukee, Wisconsin (Face–Off Consolation Game)	BSN, BSO, BSW	Stoever	W 2–1	-	9–8–3
January 7	8:07 PM	at St. Thomas		St. Thomas Ice Arena • Mendota Heights, Minnesota		Stoever	W 4–2	504	10–8–3 (7–4–1)
January 8	8:07 PM	at St. Thomas		St. Thomas Ice Arena • Mendota Heights, Minnesota		Rose	W 2–1 ^{OT}	540	11–8–3 (8–4–1)
January 14	7:07 PM	Bemidji State		Slater Family Ice Arena • Bowling Green, Ohio		Rose	L 3–5	3,686	11–9–3 (8–5–1)
January 15	7:07 PM	Bemidji State		Slater Family Ice Arena • Bowling Green, Ohio		Stoever	W 3–2 ^{OT}	2,465	12–9–3 (9–5–1)
January 28	7:07 PM	at Ferris State		Ewigleben Arena • Big Rapids, Michigan		Stoever	W 4–3	1,507	13–9–3 (10–5–1)
January 29	6:07 PM	at Ferris State		Ewigleben Arena • Big Rapids, Michigan		Stoever	L 1–2	1,547	13–10–3 (10–6–1)
February 4	7:07 PM	#1 Minnesota State		Slater Family Ice Arena • Bowling Green, Ohio		Stoever	L 1–3	2,854	13–11–3 (10–7–1)
February 5	7:07 PM	#1 Minnesota State		Slater Family Ice Arena • Bowling Green, Ohio		Stoever	L 0–5	3,711	13–12–3 (10–8–1)
February 11	7:07 PM	at #14 Michigan Tech		MacInnes Student Ice Arena • Houghton, Michigan		Stoever	L 0–4	3,017	13–13–3 (10–9–1)
February 12	5:07 PM	at #14 Michigan Tech		MacInnes Student Ice Arena • Houghton, Michigan		Stoever	W 4–2	2,960	14–13–3 (11–9–1)
February 18	7:07 PM	Northern Michigan		Slater Family Ice Arena • Bowling Green, Ohio		Stoever	L 3–6	2,611	14–14–3 (11–10–1)
February 19	7:07 PM	Northern Michigan		Slater Family Ice Arena • Bowling Green, Ohio		Stoever	L 2–4	3,734	14–15–3 (11–11–1)
February 25	7:07 PM	at Lake Superior State		Taffy Abel Arena • Sault Ste. Marie, Michigan		Stoever	L 1–5	1,192	14–16–3 (11–12–1)
February 26	6:07 PM	at Lake Superior State		Taffy Abel Arena • Sault Ste. Marie, Michigan		Stoever	L 1–3	1,396	14–17–3 (11–13–1)
CCHA Tournament
March 4	8:07 PM	at Bemidji State*		Sanford Center • Bemidji, Minnesota (Quarterfinal game 1)		Stoever	W 2–1	1,422	15–17–3
March 5	7:07 PM	at Bemidji State*		Sanford Center • Bemidji, Minnesota (Quarterfinal game 2)		Stoever	L 2–4	1,601	15–18–3
March 6	6:07 PM	at Bemidji State*		Sanford Center • Bemidji, Minnesota (Quarterfinal game 3)		Stoever	L 1–3	1,512	15–19–3
*Non-conference game. ^{#}Rankings from USCHO.com Poll. All times are in Eastern Time. Source:

== Scoring statistics ==
Name	Position	Games	Goals	Assists	Points	PIM
Taylor Schneider	LW	37	8	22	30	20
Austen Swankler	C	36	8	18	26	14
Alex Barber	F	32	10	15	25	32
Nathan Burke	F	37	16	7	23	14
Coale Norris	LW	33	10	9	19	26
Gabriel Chicoine	D	37	1	18	19	24
Sam Craggs	LW	37	9	5	14	80
T. J. Lloyd	D	35	1	12	13	20
Eric Parker	D	37	1	12	13	2
Ethan Scardina	F	27	5	4	9	8
Christopher Collin	C/LW	20	4	5	9	75
Adam Pitters	F	30	3	6	9	28
Ryan O'Hara	LW	33	4	4	8	12
Spencer Schneider	F	32	2	4	6	0
Brayden Krieger	F	31	1	5	6	4
Evan Dougherty	RW	15	3	2	5	17
Max Coyle	D	36	1	4	5	43
Anton Malmström	D	36	3	1	4	23
Ben Wozney	D	36	0	4	4	12
Seth Fyten	F	35	2	1	3	43
Adam Conquest	RW	10	2	0	2	4
Garrett Daly	D	34	0	2	2	6
Peter Eigner	G	1	0	0	0	0
Cameron Babiak	D	1	0	0	0	0
Chase Danol	F	2	0	0	0	0
Trevor St. Jean	F	3	0	0	0	2
Zack Rose	G	13	0	0	0	12
Christian Stoever	G	28	0	0	0	0
Bench	-	-	-	-	-	14
Total			94	160	254	535

== Goaltending statistics ==
Name	Games	Minutes	Wins	Losses	Ties	Goals against	Saves	Shut outs	SV %	GAA
Christian Stoever	28	1542	9	15	1	74	654	1	.898	2.88
Zack Rose	13	668	6	4	2	36	266	0	.881	3.23
Empty Net	-	31	-	-	-	8	-	-	-	-
Total	38	2242	15	19	3	118	920	1	.886	3.16

== Rankings ==
Poll	Week																									
Poll	Pre	1	2	3	4	5	6	7	8	9	10	11	12	13	14	15	16	17	18	19	20	21	22	23	24	25 (Final)
USCHO.com	NR	NR	NR	NR	NR	NR	NR	NR	NR	NR	NR	NR	NR	NR	NR	NR	NR	NR	NR	NR	NR	NR	NR	NR	-	NR
USA Today	NR	NR	NR	NR	NR	NR	NR	NR	NR	NR	NR	NR	NR	NR	NR	NR	NR	NR	NR	NR	NR	NR	NR	NR	NR	NR

Note: USCHO did not release a poll in week 24.

== Awards and honors ==
Player	Award	Ref
Eric Parker	CCHA Rookie Team	
Austen Swankler	CCHA Rookie Team	
