= 2021–22 Lake Superior State Lakers men's ice hockey season =

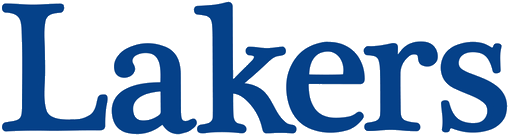
- Conference: 4th CCHA
- Home ice: Taffy Abel Arena

Rankings
- USCHO: NR
- USA Today: NR

Record
- Overall: 18–18–1
- Conference: 13–13–0
- Home: 13–7–1
- Road: 5–11–0

Coaches and captains
- Head coach: Damon Whitten
- Assistant coaches: Mike York; Zack Cisek; Mike Gugin
- Captain: Louis Boudon
- Alternate captain(s): Dustin Manz; Miroslav Mucha; Jacob Nordqvist

The 2021–22 Lake Superior State Lakers men's ice hockey season was the 56th season of play for the program, the 49th at the Division I level and the 42nd season in the CCHA conference. The Lakers represented Lake Superior State University and were coached by Damon Whitten, in his 8th season.

== Season ==
Lake Superior State joined with six other members of the WCHA to restart the CCHA for the 2021–22 season.

The Lakers were hoping to build upon their first NCAA tournament appearance in 25 years with a strong performance. Unfortunately, they lost three critical games in the first two weeks. While they went undefeated in their succeeding seven games, the strength of their opponents kept them out of the polls. A bad stretch in November also cost Lake State and put the Lakers on the wrong side of .500.

The defense looked like it had recovered during a weekend split with top-ranked Minnesota State but then the offense flagged the following week against lowly Ferris State. The team went up and down in their play for several months but began to show a bit more consistency towards the end of the season. However, despite the improvement, Lake Superior was too far down the PairWise rankings to make the tournament without a conference championship.

Lake Superior began postseason play at home against Northern Michigan and laid an egg in the first game. The Lakers allowed the first five goals of the game and were only able to score with less than 5 minutes to play. They were much better in the rematch, winning 3–2 to tie the series and force a deciding rubber match. After surrendering the first goal, the Lakers reeled off three in a row to build a 3–1 lead early in the second period. Northern Michigan replied with a deluge of goals, scoring four times in the span of 8 minutes to take a commanding lead. Lake State was unable to add to their total for most of the third and were forced to pull Ethan Langenegger in desperation. The ploy worked once but the Wildcats managed to stop a tying goal from being scored and the Lakers' season was over.

== Departures ==
Player	Position	Nationality	Cause
Alex Ambrosio	Forward	Canada	Graduate transfer to Canisius
Ashton Calder	Forward	United States	Transferred to North Dakota
Hampus Eriksson	Forward	Sweden	Graduate transfer to Northern Michigan
Niko Esposito-Selivanov	Forward	Germany	Signed professional contract (Hannover Indians)
Chase Gamelin	Forward	United States	Graduation (retired)
Lukas Kälble	Defenseman	Germany	Graduate transfer to Clarkson
Michael Mannara	Defenseman	Canada	Transferred to York
Mareks Mitens	Goaltender	Latvia	Graduation (signed with Binghamton Devils)
Yuki Miura	Forward	Japan	Graduation (signed with Iowa Heartlanders)
Will Riedell	Defenseman	United States	Graduate transfer to Ohio State
Pierre-Luc Veillette	Forward	Canada	Left program (signed with Saint-Georges Cool FM 103.5)

== Recruiting ==
Player	Position	Nationality	Age	Notes
Timo Bakos	Forward	Germany	21	Augsburg, GER
Cole Craft	Forward	Canada	20	North Bay, ON
Easton Hesse	Goaltender	Canada	21	Beaumont, AB
Grant Hindman	Defenseman	United States	19	Oakland, MI
Logan Jenuwine	Forward	United States	23	Romeo, MI; transfer from Arizona State
Sebastian Miedema	Defenseman	Sweden	21	Gävle, SWE
Josh Nixon	Forward	Canada	21	Mississauga, ON
Brett Roloson	Forward	United States	20	Newport Beach, CA
Harrison Roy	Forward	United States	21	Lakeville, MA; transfer from Boston College
Dawson Tritt	Forward	United States	21	Spokane, WA
Jordan Venegoni	Forward	United States	21	Livonia, MI
Jared Westcott	Forward	United States	22	Imperial, MO; transfer from Penn State
Jake Willets	Defenseman	United States	22	Erie, MI; transfer from Ferris State

== Roster ==
As of August 20, 2021.

No.	Nat.	Player	Class	Pos	Height	Weight	DoB	Hometown	Previous team	NHL rights
1	(Canada)	Ethan Langenegger	Sophomore	G	6' 0" (1.83 m)	187 lb (85 kg)	2000-09-10	Kamloops, British Columbia	Salmon Arm Silverbacks (BCHL)	—
3	(United States)	Tyler Williams	Sophomore	F	5' 7" (1.7 m)	175 lb (79 kg)	2000-05-16	South Lyon, Michigan	Nanaimo Clippers (BCHL)	—
4	(Sweden)	Jacob Bengtsson	Sophomore	D	6' 3" (1.91 m)	202 lb (92 kg)	1999-05-08	Stockholm, Sweden	Waterloo Black Hawks (USHL)	—
5	(Sweden)	Arvid Henrikson	Junior	D	6' 5" (1.96 m)	211 lb (96 kg)	1998-02-23	Stockholm, Sweden	Austin Bruins (NAHL)	MTL, 187th overall 2016
6	(United States)	Jake Willets	Junior	D	6' 1" (1.85 m)	190 lb (86 kg)	1999-08-06	Monroe, Michigan	Ferris State (CCHA)	—
7	(Canada)	Mitchell Oliver	Senior	D	6' 0" (1.83 m)	195 lb (88 kg)	1997-06-17	Kelowna, British Columbia	Alberni Valley Bulldogs (BCHL)	—
8	(United States)	Logan Jenuwine	Sophomore	F	6' 3" (1.91 m)	205 lb (93 kg)	1998-05-15	Romeo, Michigan	Arizona State (NCAA)	—
9	(United States)	Dustin Manz (A)	Junior	F	5' 10" (1.78 m)	194 lb (88 kg)	1999-09-21	Vanderbilt, Michigan	Prince George Spruce Kings (BCHL)	—
10	(Slovakia)	Miroslav Mucha (A)	Senior	F	6' 1" (1.85 m)	197 lb (89 kg)	1997-10-07	Bytča, Slovakia	Minot Minotauros (NAHL)	—
11	(United States)	Dawson Tritt	Freshman	F	6' 2" (1.88 m)	180 lb (82 kg)	2000-09-01	Spokane, Washington	Lone Star Brahmas (NAHL)	—
12	(United States)	Brandon Puricelli	Junior	F	5' 10" (1.78 m)	180 lb (82 kg)	1998-02-04	Ellisville, Missouri	Minnesota Duluth (NCHC)	—
13	(United States)	Sepncer DenBeste	Sophomore	F	6' 1" (1.85 m)	185 lb (84 kg)	1999-02-17	Marquette, Michigan	Johnstown Tomahawks (NAHL)	—
14	(United States)	Brett Roloson	Freshman	F	5' 11" (1.8 m)	160 lb (73 kg)	2000-12-29	Worcester, Massachusetts	Minot Minotauros (NAHL)	—
15	(Sweden)	Jacob Nordqvist (A)	Senior	D	5' 9" (1.75 m)	181 lb (82 kg)	1998-02-12	Gothenburg, Sweden	Madison Capitols (USHL)	—
16	(United States)	Harrison Roy	Sophomore	F	6' 1" (1.85 m)	194 lb (88 kg)	2000-01-17	Lakeville, Massachusetts	Boston College (HEA)	—
17	(Sweden)	Sebastian Miedema	Freshman	D	6' 1" (1.85 m)	194 lb (88 kg)	2000-09-09	Gävle, Sweden	Sioux Falls Stampede (USHL)	—
18	(Canada)	Cole Craft	Freshman	F	6' 2" (1.88 m)	195 lb (88 kg)	2001-06-29	North Bay, Ontario	Lincoln Stars (USHL)	—
19	(United States)	Joshua Wildauer	Sophomore	F	5' 8" (1.73 m)	170 lb (77 kg)	1999-06-16	Dearborn Heights, Michigan	Coquitlam Express (BCHL)	—
20	(United States)	Grant Hindman	Freshman	D	6' 0" (1.83 m)	200 lb (91 kg)	2002-05-16	Oakland, Michigan	Youngstown Phantoms (USHL)	—
21	(United States)	Jordan Venegoni	Freshman	F	6' 0" (1.83 m)	185 lb (84 kg)	2000-08-16	Livonia, Michigan	Amarillo Bulls (NAHL)	—
22	(Germany)	Timo Bakos	Freshman	F	6' 1" (1.85 m)	194 lb (88 kg)	2000-07-28	Augsburg, Germany	Starbulls Rosenheim (Oberliga)	—
23	(Belarus)	Artyom Borshyov	Sophomore	D	6' 3" (1.91 m)	210 lb (95 kg)	2000-08-22	Vitebsk, Belarus	Northern Cyclones (NCDC)	—
24	(Canada)	Josh Nixon	Freshman	F	5' 8" (1.73 m)	175 lb (79 kg)	2000-05-09	Mississauga, Ontario	Maryland Black Bears (NAHL)	—
25	(Canada)	Jeremy Gervais	Sophomore	D	5' 11" (1.8 m)	180 lb (82 kg)	1999-01-09	Prince George, British Columbia	Salmon Arm Silverbacks (BCHL)	—
26	(Canada)	Jack Jeffers	Senior	F	6' 0" (1.83 m)	180 lb (82 kg)	1997-09-21	Oakville, Ontario	Alabama Huntsville (WCHA)	—
27	(United States)	Benito Posa	Sophomore	F	6' 1" (1.85 m)	190 lb (86 kg)	1999-01-16	Grand Blanc, Michigan	Des Moines Buccaneers (USHL)	—
28	(United States)	Jared Westcott	Sophomore	F	6' 1" (1.85 m)	190 lb (86 kg)	1999-07-18	Imperial, Missouri	Penn State (Big Ten)	—
29	(France)	Louis Boudon (C)	Junior	F	5' 11" (1.8 m)	172 lb (78 kg)	1998-10-04	Grenoble, France	Northeast Generals (NAHL)	—
30	(Canada)	Easton Hesse	Freshman	G	6' 0" (1.83 m)	175 lb (79 kg)	2000-06-28	Beaumont, Alberta	Bonnyville Pontiacs (AJHL)	—
31	(United States)	Seth Eisele	Junior	G	6' 5" (1.96 m)	195 lb (88 kg)	1998-10-30	Lake Elmo, Minnesota	Lone Star Brahmas (NAHL)	—

== Standings ==
2021–22 Central Collegiate Hockey Association Standings
	Conference record										Overall record					
	GP	W	L	T	OTW	OTL	3/SW	PTS	GF	GA	GP	W	L	T	GF	GA
#2 Minnesota State †*	26	23	3	0	2	0	0	67	115	28	44	38	6	0	178	60
#14 Michigan Tech	26	16	8	2	2	4	0	54	93	53	37	21	13	3	118	75
Bemidji State	26	14	12	0	1	1	0	42	83	81	39	19	20	0	118	121
Lake Superior State	26	13	13	0	1	1	0	39	69	64	37	18	18	1	107	104
Northern Michigan	26	12	13	1	3	0	1	35	86	99	37	20	16	1	132	136
Bowling Green	26	11	14	1	2	1	0	33	67	87	37	15	19	3	94	119
Ferris State	26	9	16	1	2	2	0	28	66	99	36	11	24	1	90	135
St. Thomas	26	3	22	1	0	4	0	14	45	112	36	3	32	1	61	168
Championship: March 19, 2022 † indicates conference regular season champion (MacNaughton Cup) * indicates conference tournament champion (Mason Cup); Rankings: USCHO.com Top 20 Poll

== Schedule and results ==
Date	Time	Opponent^{#}	Rank^{#}	Site	TV	Decision	Result	Attendance	Record
Regular season
October 2	8:07 PM	at #17 Omaha*		Baxter Arena • Omaha, Nebraska		Eisele	W 4–3 ^{OT}	3,397	1–0–0
October 3	7:07 PM	at #17 Omaha*		Baxter Arena • Omaha, Nebraska		Langenegger	L 0–3	2,837	1–1–0
October 8	7:30 PM	at #3 Michigan*		Yost Ice Arena • Ann Arbor, Michigan	BTN+	Eisele	L 1–6	5,246	1–2–0
October 9	7:00 PM	at #3 Michigan*		Yost Ice Arena • Ann Arbor, Michigan	BTN+	Langenegger	L 4–7	5,141	1–3–0
October 15	7:07 PM	St. Thomas		Taffy Abel Arena • Sault Ste. Marie, Michigan		Langenegger	W 3–1	0	2–3–0 (1–0–0)
October 16	6:07 PM	St. Thomas		Taffy Abel Arena • Sault Ste. Marie, Michigan		Eisele	W 6–3	1,646	3–3–0 (2–0–0)
October 22	7:00 PM	Union*		Taffy Abel Arena • Sault Ste. Marie, Michigan		Langenegger	W 7–4	1,109	4–3–0
October 23	7:00 PM	Union*		Taffy Abel Arena • Sault Ste. Marie, Michigan		Eisele	W 5–2	965	5–3–0
October 29	7:07 PM	St. Lawrence*		Taffy Abel Arena • Sault Ste. Marie, Michigan		Langenegger	T 2–2 ^{OT}	1,151	5–3–1
October 30	7:07 PM	St. Lawrence*		Taffy Abel Arena • Sault Ste. Marie, Michigan		Eisele	W 7–1	1,136	6–3–1
November 5	7:07 PM	at #18 Michigan Tech		MacInnes Student Ice Arena • Houghton, Michigan		Langenegger	W 3–2 ^{OT}	2,610	7–3–1 (3–0–0)
November 6	6:07 PM	at #18 Michigan Tech		MacInnes Student Ice Arena • Houghton, Michigan		Eisele	L 0–2	2,429	7–4–1 (3–1–0)
November 12	7:07 PM	Bemidji State		Taffy Abel Arena • Sault Ste. Marie, Michigan		Langenegger	L 2–4	1,273	7–5–1 (3–2–0)
November 13	6:07 PM	Bemidji State		Taffy Abel Arena • Sault Ste. Marie, Michigan		Eisele	L 4–5	0	7–6–1 (3–3–0)
November 19	7:07 PM	at Bowling Green		Slater Family Ice Arena • Bowling Green, Ohio		Langenegger	L 1–5	2,561	7–7–1 (3–4–0)
November 20	7:07 PM	at Bowling Green		Slater Family Ice Arena • Bowling Green, Ohio		Langenegger	L 2–6	2,625	7–8–1 (3–5–0)
November 26	7:07 PM	#1 Minnesota State		Taffy Abel Arena • Sault Ste. Marie, Michigan		Langenegger	W 1–0	822	8–8–1 (4–5–0)
November 27	6:07 PM	#1 Minnesota State		Taffy Abel Arena • Sault Ste. Marie, Michigan		Langenegger	L 0–3	1,014	8–9–1 (4–6–0)
December 3	7:07 PM	at Ferris State		Ewigleben Arena • Big Rapids, Michigan		Langenegger	W 3–0	1,344	9–9–1 (5–6–0)
December 4	6:07 PM	at Ferris State		Ewigleben Arena • Big Rapids, Michigan		Langenegger	L 1–3	1,640	9–10–1 (5–7–0)
December 10	7:07 PM	#19 Northern Michigan		Taffy Abel Arena • Sault Ste. Marie, Michigan		Langenegger	W 7–2	500	10–10–1 (6–7–0)
December 11	6:07 PM	#19 Northern Michigan		Taffy Abel Arena • Sault Ste. Marie, Michigan		Eisele	W 4–1	790	11–10–1 (7–7–0)
January 7	8:07 PM	at Bemidji State		Sanford Center • Bemidji, Minnesota		Langenegger	L 1–5	2,165	11–11–1 (7–8–0)
January 8	7:07 PM	at Bemidji State		Sanford Center • Bemidji, Minnesota		Eisele	L 1–5	2,609	11–12–1 (7–9–0)
January 14	7:07 PM	#19 Michigan Tech		Taffy Abel Arena • Sault Ste. Marie, Michigan		Langenegger	L 0–3	1,077	11–13–1 (7–10–0)
January 15	6:07 PM	#19 Michigan Tech		Taffy Abel Arena • Sault Ste. Marie, Michigan		Langenegger	L 0–3	1,175	11–14–1 (7–11–0)
January 21	7:07 PM	USNTDP*		Taffy Abel Arena • Sault Ste. Marie, Michigan (Exhibition)			W 5–1		
January 28	6:37 PM	at #20 Northern Michigan		Berry Events Center • Marquette, Michigan		Eisele	W 6–1	2,288	12–14–1 (8–11–0)
January 29	6:37 PM	at #20 Northern Michigan		Berry Events Center • Marquette, Michigan		Eisele	L 1–2 ^{OT}	2,564	12–15–1 (8–12–0)
February 11	7:07 PM	Ferris State		Taffy Abel Arena • Sault Ste. Marie, Michigan		Eisele	W 5–3	1,037	13–15–1 (9–12–0)
February 12	6:07 PM	Ferris State		Taffy Abel Arena • Sault Ste. Marie, Michigan		Langenegger	W 4–0	1,310	14–15–1 (10–12–0)
February 18	8:07 PM	at St. Thomas		St. Thomas Ice Arena • Mendota Heights, Minnesota		Eisele	L 1–2	643	14–16–1 (10–13–0)
February 19	8:07 PM	at St. Thomas		St. Thomas Ice Arena • Mendota Heights, Minnesota		Langenegger	W 5–1	521	15–16–1 (11–13–0)
February 25	7:07 PM	Bowling Green		Taffy Abel Arena • Sault Ste. Marie, Michigan		Eisele	W 5–1	1,192	16–16–1 (12–13–0)
February 26	6:07 PM	Bowling Green		Taffy Abel Arena • Sault Ste. Marie, Michigan		Langenegger	W 3–1	1,396	17–16–1 (13–13–0)
CCHA Tournament
March 4	6:07 PM	Northern Michigan*		Taffy Abel Arena • Sault Ste. Marie, Michigan (Quarterfinal game 1)		Eisele	L 1–5	1,050	17–17–1
March 5	6:07 PM	Northern Michigan*		Taffy Abel Arena • Sault Ste. Marie, Michigan (Quarterfinal game 2)		Langenegger	W 3–2	1,100	18–17–1
March 6	6:07 PM	Northern Michigan*		Taffy Abel Arena • Sault Ste. Marie, Michigan (Quarterfinal game 3)		Langenegger	L 4–5	850	18–18–1
Lake Superior State Lost Series 1–2
*Non-conference game. ^{#}Rankings from USCHO.com Poll. All times are in Eastern Time. Source:

== Scoring statistics ==
Name	Position	Games	Goals	Assists	Points	PIM
Louis Boudon	C	36	15	29	44	31
Miroslav Mucha	RW	37	10	25	35	8
Jacob Bengtsson	D	36	3	24	27	63
Brandon Puricelli	RW	24	13	9	22	10
Logan Jenuwine	F	27	9	11	20	4
Josh Nixon	RW	37	8	12	20	16
Harrison Roy	F	29	7	12	19	8
Jacob Nordqvist	D	36	5	11	16	24
Dustin Manz	C	34	7	7	14	10
Jake Willets	D	35	6	8	14	32
Benito Posa	F	26	5	6	11	24
Dawson Tritt	F	33	4	6	10	14
Mitchell Oliver	D	35	3	6	9	48
Timo Bakos	F	35	6	2	8	0
Joshua Wildauer	C	34	2	6	8	12
Cole Craft	RW	23	2	3	5	27
Arvid Henrikson	D	35	0	5	5	56
Jeremy Gervais	D	16	0	4	4	10
Artyom Borshyov	D	35	0	4	4	10
Brett Roloson	F	29	1	2	3	0
Tyler Williams	C	19	1	1	2	0
Easton Hesse	G	1	0		1	27
Jack Jeffers	F	1	0	0	0	0
Sebastian Miedema	D	3	0	0	0	0
Jared Westcott	F	4	0	0	0	0
Spencer DenBeste	F	7	0	0	0	4
Seth Eisele	G	16	0	0	0	0
Ethan Langenegger	G	22	0	0	0	0
Grant Hindman	D	26	0	0	0	10
Total			107	193	300	453

== Goaltending statistics ==
Name	Games	Minutes	Wins	Losses	Ties	Goals against	Saves	Shut outs	SV %	GAA
Ethan Langenegger	22	1313	10	11	1	58	602	3	.912	2.65
Seth Eisele	16	900	8	7	0	41	419	0	.911	2.73
Empty Net	-	18	-	-	-	5	-	-	-	-
Total	37	2231	18	18	1	104	1021	3	.908	2.80

== Rankings ==
Poll	Week																									
Poll	Pre	1	2	3	4	5	6	7	8	9	10	11	12	13	14	15	16	17	18	19	20	21	22	23	24	25 (Final)
USCHO.com	NR	NR	NR	NR	NR	NR	NR	NR	NR	NR	NR	NR	NR	NR	NR	NR	NR	NR	NR	NR	NR	NR	NR	NR	-	NR
USA Today	NR	NR	NR	NR	NR	NR	NR	NR	NR	NR	NR	NR	NR	NR	NR	NR	NR	NR	NR	NR	NR	NR	NR	NR	NR	NR

Note: USCHO did not release a poll in week 24.

== Awards and honors ==
Player	Award	Ref
Jacob Bengtsson	CCHA Second Team	
Louis Boudon	CCHA Second Team	
Josh Nixon	CCHA Rookie Team	
