= Dave Shyiak =

Canadian ice hockey coach

Current position
- Title: Head coach
- Team: Northern Michigan
- Conference: CCHA
- Record: 8–56–4 (.147)

Biographical details
- Born: November 4, 1966 (age 59); Flin Flon, Manitoba, Canada
- Education: Northern Michigan University

Playing career
- 1987–1991: Northern Michigan
- 1991–1992: Murrayfield Racers
- Position: Right Wing

Coaching career (HC unless noted)
- 1992–1993: Northern Michigan (graduate assistant)
- 1993–1994: Kimberley Dynamiters
- 1994–1995: Merritt Centennials
- 1995–2005: Northern Michigan (assistant)
- 2005–2013: Alaska-Anchorage
- 2013–2014: Toronto Maple Leafs (Scout)
- 2014–2020: Western Michigan (Associate)
- 2020–2024: St. Cloud State (Associate)
- 2024–present: Northern Michigan

Head coaching record
- Overall: 93–233–37 (.307)

Accomplishments and honors

Championships
- 1991 NCAA National Championship

Dave Shyiak (born November 4, 1966) is a Canadian former ice hockey player and coach. He was part of Northern Michigan's national title run in the 1991 tournament.

== Career ==
The Brandon, Manitoba native began his college career as a freshman under Rick Comley at Northern Michigan. Shyiak's term as a player for the Wildcats coincided with high point for the team winning 20 games in three consecutive seasons, making two NCAA Tournaments and winning their only national title in his senior year. After graduating Shyiak spent one more season playing in the BHL before returning to Marquette. Shyiak spent the 1992–93 season as a graduate assistant for his former team and then moved on to become the head coach for the Kimberley Dynamiters the following year. He move again the next season to become the head coach/assistant GM for the Merritt Centennials for one year before returning to his alma mater as a full-time assistant coach.

Shyiak spent a decade as an assistant at Northern Michigan, serving under both his former coach and his successor Walt Kyle until he was offered the top job at Alaska-Anchorage. Shyiak took over the Seawolves in 2005-06 and while the team demonstrated some promise he could not get the club to have a single winning season during his eight-year tenure (something Alaska-Anchorage has struggled with since joining the WCHA). After his contract expired following the 2012-13 season he was not retained, making room for Matt Thomas to succeed him as coach.

Since his dismissal Shyiak signed on as an amateur scout with the Toronto Maple Leafs for one season. He was named associate head coach of the Western Michigan men's ice hockey team on Sept. 15, 2014.

On June 26, 2024, Shyiak was named head coach of the Northern Michigan Wildcats men's ice hockey team.

== Career statistics ==
			Regular season					Playoffs
Season	Team	League	GP	G	A	Pts	PIM	GP	G	A	Pts	PIM
1986–87	Humboldt Broncos	SJHL	64	59	42	101	—	—	—	—	—	—
1987–88	Northern Michigan	NCAA	36	10	3	13	71	—	—	—	—	—
1988–89	Northern Michigan	NCAA	24	2	5	7	22	—	—	—	—	—
1989–90	Northern Michigan	NCAA	29	2	5	7	44	—	—	—	—	—
1990–91	Northern Michigan	NCAA	36	6	9	15	80	—	—	—	—	—
1991–92	Murrayfield Racers	BHL	27	31	23	54	61	5	4	8	12	38
NCAA totals			125	20	22	42	217	—	—	—	—	—

== Head coaching record ==
Record table
Season	Team	Overall	Conference	Standing	Postseason
Alaska–Anchorage Seawolves (WCHA) (2005–2013)
2005–06	Alaska–Anchorage	6–27–3	4–21–3	10th	WCHA First Round
2006–07	Alaska–Anchorage	13–21–3	8–19–1	10th	WCHA First Round
2007–08	Alaska–Anchorage	7–21–8	3–19–6	10th	WCHA First Round
2008–09	Alaska–Anchorage	14–17–5	9–14–5	9th	WCHA First Round
2009–10	Alaska–Anchorage	11–23–2	9–17–2	t–8th	WCHA First Round
2010–11	Alaska–Anchorage	16–18–3	12–14–2	t–8th	WCHA Quarterfinals
2011–12	Alaska–Anchorage	9–25–2	5–22–1	12th	WCHA First Round
2012–13	Alaska–Anchorage	4–25–7	2–20–6	12th	WCHA First Round
Alaska–Anchorage:		80–177–33	52–146–26		
Northern Michigan Wildcats (CCHA) (2024–present)
2024–25	Northern Michigan	5–27–2	4–20–2	9th	
2025–26	Northern Michigan	3–29–2	3–21–2	9th	
Northern Michigan:		8–56–4	7–41–4		
Total:		93–233–37			
National champion Postseason invitational champion Conference regular season champion Conference regular season and conference tournament champion Division regular season champion Division regular season and conference tournament champion Conference tournament champion
