= Phil Fox =

American ice hockey player (born 1985)

- Born: August 17, 1985 (age 41) Stillwater, Minnesota, USA
- Height: 5 ft 11 in (180 cm)
- Weight: 205 lb (93 kg; 14 st 9 lb)
- Position: Forward
- Shot: Right
- Played for: Texas/Fort Worth Brahmas (CHL) 2011-2013; Houston Aeros (AHL) 2012-2013; Allen Americans (CHL) 2013-2014
- NHL draft: Undrafted
- Playing career: 2011–2014 Coaching career

Current position
- Title: Assistant coach
- Team: Northern Michigan
- Conference: CCHA

Biographical details
- Education: Northern Michigan University

Coaching career (HC unless noted)
- 2014–2016: Northern Michigan (dir. of hockey ops.)
- 2016–2017: Stillwater High (asst.)
- 2017–2019: New Mexico Ice Wolves 14U
- 2019–2024: New Mexico Ice Wolves (HC/GM)
- 2024–Present: Northern Michigan (asst.)

Phil Fox (born August 17, 1985) is an American ice hockey coach and former player. He played with the Allen Americans and Fort Worth Brahmas of the Central Hockey League (CHL) and Houston Aeros of the American Hockey League (AHL).

Fox played four years (2007-2011) of NCAA college hockey with the Northern Michigan Wildcats men's ice hockey team.

On February 22, 2013, after nearly two seasons in the CHL, Fox made his American Hockey League debut playing with the Houston Aeros.

Fox left the Brahmas after his two seasons to join CHL rival the Allen Americans on June 27, 2013.

In 2019, Fox became the first head coach for the New Mexico Ice Wolves.

In July 2024, Fox was named as an assistant coach at his alma mater, Northern Michigan University.
