= Michigan Tech–Northern Michigan men's ice hockey rivalry =

College sports rivalry

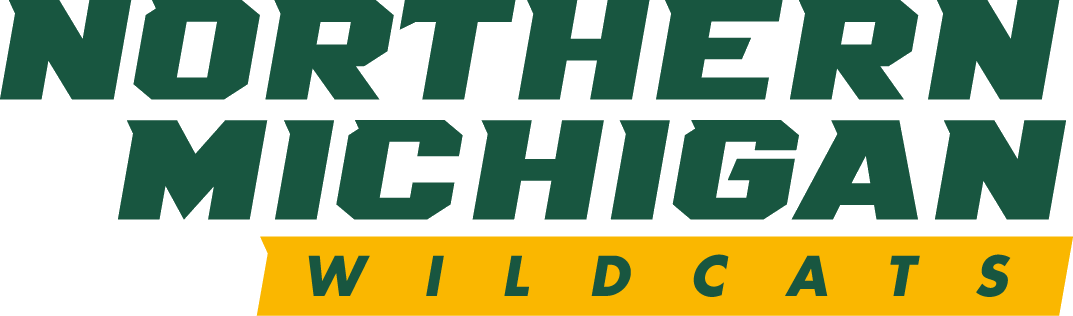
- Michigan Tech Huskies Northern Michigan Wildcats
- Sport: Ice hockey
- First meeting: November 23, 1979; Michigan Tech 3, Northern Michigan 2
- Latest meeting: January 25, 2025; Michigan Tech 4, Northern Michigan 0
- Next meeting: TBD
- Stadiums: MacInnes Student Ice Arena; Berry Events Center

Statistics
- Total meetings: 181
- All-time series: Michigan Tech, 87–80–14 (.519)
- Largest victory: Northern Michigan, 9–0 (October 8, 1999)
- Longest win streak: Michigan Tech, 8 (March 6, 2020 – 27 February 2021)
- Longest unbeaten streak: Northern Michigan, 10 (October 9, 1998 – December 9, 2000)
- Current win streak: Michigan Tech, 5 (November 1, 2024 – present)
- Current unbeaten streak: Michigan Tech, 6 (February 3, 2024 – present)

The Michigan Tech–Northern Michigan men's ice hockey rivalry is a college ice hockey rivalry between the Michigan Tech Huskies men's ice hockey and Northern Michigan Wildcats men's ice hockey programs. The first meeting between the two occurred on October 12, 1979, as an exhibition match. The first official game occurred just over a month later with Michigan Tech winning the inaugural meeting.

== History ==
Michigan Tech played its first ice hockey game in 1920 and had the Upper Peninsula to itself for nearly 50 years. Northern Michigan played its first game in 1976 and swiftly rose to prominence in the CCHA. At the start of the 1979–80 season, the two programs, who were separated by less than 100 miles (160 km), played their first games against one another. Two years later, Michigan Tech was one of four teams to leave the WCHA and joined the CCHA. After three years, both schools left the CCHA and joined the WCHA, remaining conference rivals until the late 1990s. Northern Michigan rejoined the CCHA in 1997 and remained with the conference until its dissolution in 2013. During this period, both programs continued to play one another annually. NMU returned to the WCHA in 2013 and rekindled the conference rivalry with MTU. Both programs continued with the conference until they reformed the CCHA jointly with five other programs and began play in the refurbished conference in 2021.

== Game results ==
Full game results for the rivalry, with rankings beginning in the 1995–96 season.

Michigan Tech victories	Northern Michigan victories	Tie games

No.	Date	Location	Winning team		Losing team		Notes
1	November 23, 1979	Lakeview Arena; Marquette, MI	Michigan Tech	3	Northern Michigan	2	
2	November 24, 1979	Lakeview Arena; Marquette, MI	Northern Michigan	6	Michigan Tech	2	
3	November 7, 1980	Lakeview Arena; Marquette, MI	Michigan Tech	3	Northern Michigan	1	
4	November 8, 1980	Lakeview Arena; Marquette, MI	Tie	1	Tie	1	(OT)
5	January 2, 1981	Student Ice Arena; Houghton, MI	Northern Michigan	3	Michigan Tech	2	
6	January 3, 1981	Student Ice Arena; Houghton, MI	Northern Michigan	5	Michigan Tech	2	
7	March 28, 1981	Duluth Arena; Duluth, MN	Michigan Tech	5	Northern Michigan	2	NCAA Consolation Game
8	January 15, 1982	Lakeview Arena; Marquette, MI	Michigan Tech	6	Northern Michigan	2	First CCHA match
9	January 16, 1982	Student Ice Arena; Houghton, MI	Michigan Tech	6	Northern Michigan	4	
10	February 19, 1982	Student Ice Arena; Houghton, MI	Michigan Tech	5	Northern Michigan	4	
11	February 20, 1982	Lakeview Arena; Marquette, MI	Michigan Tech	7	Northern Michigan	2	
12	January 14, 1983	Student Ice Arena; Houghton, MI	Michigan Tech	4	Northern Michigan	3	(OT)
13	January 15, 1983	Lakeview Arena; Marquette, MI	Northern Michigan	9	Michigan Tech	3	
14	February 18, 1983	Lakeview Arena; Marquette, MI	Michigan Tech	5	Northern Michigan	1	
15	February 19, 1983	Student Ice Arena; Houghton, MI	Michigan Tech	4	Northern Michigan	1	
16	March 4, 1983	Student Ice Arena; Houghton, MI	Northern Michigan	3	Michigan Tech	2	CCHA Quarterfinal game 1
17	March 5, 1983	Student Ice Arena; Houghton, MI	Tie	3	Tie	3	CCHA Quarterfinal game 2
18	October 14, 1983	Student Ice Arena; Houghton, MI	Michigan Tech	5	Northern Michigan	4	
19	October 15, 1983	Lakeview Arena; Marquette, MI	Michigan Tech	6	Northern Michigan	2	
20	December 16, 1983	Lakeview Arena; Marquette, MI	Northern Michigan	2	Michigan Tech	1	
21	December 17, 1983	Student Ice Arena; Houghton, MI	Northern Michigan	4	Michigan Tech	3	(OT)
22	February 10, 1984	Student Ice Arena; Houghton, MI	Northern Michigan	8	Michigan Tech	5	
23	February 11, 1984	Lakeview Arena; Marquette, MI	Michigan Tech	4	Northern Michigan	3	(OT)
24	October 26, 1984	Student Ice Arena; Houghton, MI	Michigan Tech	5	Northern Michigan	4	(OT), First WCHA match
25	October 27, 1984	Lakeview Arena; Marquette, MI	Northern Michigan	6	Michigan Tech	3	
26	January 18, 1985	Lakeview Arena; Marquette, MI	Michigan Tech	3	Northern Michigan	2	
27	January 19, 1985	Student Ice Arena; Houghton, MI	Michigan Tech	8	Northern Michigan	6	
28	October 11, 1985	Student Ice Arena; Houghton, MI	Tie	2	Tie	2	(OT)
29	October 12, 1985	Lakeview Arena; Marquette, MI	Northern Michigan	10	Michigan Tech	2	
30	December 13, 1985	Student Ice Arena; Houghton, MI	Northern Michigan	6	Michigan Tech	5	
31	December 14, 1985	Lakeview Arena; Marquette, MI	Northern Michigan	8	Michigan Tech	1	
32	February 7, 1986	Lakeview Arena; Marquette, MI	Northern Michigan	6	Michigan Tech	2	
33	February 8, 1986	Student Ice Arena; Houghton, MI	Michigan Tech	5	Northern Michigan	3	
34	October 31, 1986	Student Ice Arena; Houghton, MI	Northern Michigan	4	Michigan Tech	3	(OT)
35	November 1, 1986	Lakeview Arena; Marquette, MI	Northern Michigan	6	Michigan Tech	1	
36	January 30, 1987	Lakeview Arena; Marquette, MI	Northern Michigan	5	Michigan Tech	1	
37	January 31, 1987	Student Ice Arena; Houghton, MI	Michigan Tech	4	Northern Michigan	3	
38	November 11, 1987	Student Ice Arena; Houghton, MI	Michigan Tech	4	Northern Michigan	3	(OT)
39	November 21, 1987	Lakeview Arena; Marquette, MI	Tie	4	Tie	4	(OT)
40	January 14, 1988	Student Ice Arena; Houghton, MI	Michigan Tech	4	Northern Michigan	2	
41	January 16, 1988	Lakeview Arena; Marquette, MI	Michigan Tech	7	Northern Michigan	2	
42	October 14, 1988	Student Ice Arena; Houghton, MI	Northern Michigan	6	Michigan Tech	2	
43	October 16, 1988	Lakeview Arena; Marquette, MI	Michigan Tech	6	Northern Michigan	4	
44	January 6, 1989	Lakeview Arena; Marquette, MI	Michigan Tech	6	Northern Michigan	5	(OT)
45	January 7, 1989	Student Ice Arena; Houghton, MI	Northern Michigan	4	Michigan Tech	2	
46	October 27, 1989	Student Ice Arena; Houghton, MI	Northern Michigan	8	Michigan Tech	3	
47	October 28, 1989	Lakeview Arena; Marquette, MI	Michigan Tech	5	Northern Michigan	4	(OT)
48	December 30, 1989	Joe Louis Arena; Detroit, MI	Michigan Tech	5	Northern Michigan	1	Great Lakes Invitational consolation game
49	January 26, 1990	Lakeview Arena; Marquette, MI	Northern Michigan	10	Michigan Tech	7	
50	January 27, 1990	Student Ice Arena; Houghton, MI	Northern Michigan	3	Michigan Tech	2	(OT)
51	November 30, 1990	Lakeview Arena; Marquette, MI	Northern Michigan	6	Michigan Tech	3	
52	December 1, 1990	Student Ice Arena; Houghton, MI	Northern Michigan	4	Michigan Tech	3	
53	February 15, 1991	Student Ice Arena; Houghton, MI	Northern Michigan	4	Michigan Tech	1	
54	February 16, 1991	Lakeview Arena; Marquette, MI	Northern Michigan	6	Michigan Tech	2	
55	November 1, 1991	Lakeview Arena; Marquette, MI	Michigan Tech	3	Northern Michigan	2	
56	November 2, 1991	MacInnes Student Ice Arena; Houghton, MI	Tie	4	Tie	4	(OT)
57	February 14, 1992	Lakeview Arena; Marquette, MI	Northern Michigan	4	Michigan Tech	3	
58	February 15, 1992	MacInnes Student Ice Arena; Houghton, MI	Northern Michigan	7	Michigan Tech	3	
59	March 13, 1992	Lakeview Arena; Marquette, MI	Northern Michigan	9	Michigan Tech	1	WCHA Quarterfinals game 1
60	March 14, 1992	Lakeview Arena; Marquette, MI	Northern Michigan	6	Michigan Tech	2	WCHA Quarterfinals game 2
61	November 13, 1992	MacInnes Student Ice Arena; Houghton, MI	Northern Michigan	4	Michigan Tech	3	
62	November 14, 1992	Lakeview Arena; Marquette, MI	Michigan Tech	4	Northern Michigan	3	
63	February 19, 1993	Lakeview Arena; Marquette, MI	Northern Michigan	3	Michigan Tech	2	
64	February 20, 1993	MacInnes Student Ice Arena; Houghton, MI	Michigan Tech	4	Northern Michigan	3	
65	March 18, 1993	St. Paul Civic Center; Saint Paul, MN	Northern Michigan	4	Michigan Tech	3	WCHA Final Five
66	October 29, 1993	Lakeview Arena; Marquette, MI	Northern Michigan	7	Michigan Tech	3	
67	October 30, 1993	MacInnes Student Ice Arena; Houghton, MI	Michigan Tech	6	Northern Michigan	3	
68	March 4, 1994	MacInnes Student Ice Arena; Houghton, MI	Michigan Tech	5	Northern Michigan	3	
69	March 5, 1994	Lakeview Arena; Marquette, MI	Northern Michigan	3	Michigan Tech	2	
70	March 17, 1994	Bradley Center; Milwaukee, WI	Michigan Tech	5	Northern Michigan	1	WCHA Final Five
71	November 4, 1994	MacInnes Student Ice Arena; Houghton, MI	Michigan Tech	3	Northern Michigan	1	
72	November 5, 1994	Lakeview Arena; Marquette, MI	Michigan Tech	6	Northern Michigan	2	
73	February 17, 1995	Lakeview Arena; Marquette, MI	Michigan Tech	5	Northern Michigan	3	
74	February 18, 1995	MacInnes Student Ice Arena; Houghton, MI	Northern Michigan	8	Michigan Tech	3	
75	December 30, 1995	Joe Louis Arena; Detroit, MI	Michigan Tech	6	Northern Michigan	2	Great Lakes Invitational consolation game
76	January 12, 1996	Lakeview Arena; Marquette, MI	Northern Michigan	4	Michigan Tech	3	
77	January 13, 1996	MacInnes Student Ice Arena; Houghton, MI	Michigan Tech	4	Northern Michigan	2	
78	February 9, 1996	MacInnes Student Ice Arena; Houghton, MI	Michigan Tech	6	Northern Michigan	2	
79	February 10, 1996	Lakeview Arena; Marquette, MI	Northern Michigan	6	Michigan Tech	1	
80	October 11, 1996	MacInnes Student Ice Arena; Houghton, MI	Northern Michigan	3	Michigan Tech	2	
81	October 12, 1996	Lakeview Arena; Marquette, MI	Michigan Tech	5	Northern Michigan	2	
82	February 21, 1997	Lakeview Arena; Marquette, MI	Northern Michigan	4	Michigan Tech	3	
83	February 22, 1997	MacInnes Student Ice Arena; Houghton, MI	Northern Michigan	5	Michigan Tech	3	
84	October 17, 1997	Lakeview Arena; Marquette, MI	Tie	4	Tie	4	(OT), Non-conference play begins
85	October 18, 1997	MacInnes Student Ice Arena; Houghton, MI	Michigan Tech	8	Northern Michigan	2	
86	October 9, 1998	MacInnes Student Ice Arena; Houghton, MI	Northern Michigan	8	Michigan Tech	2	
87	October 10, 1998	Lakeview Arena; Marquette, MI	Northern Michigan	3	Michigan Tech	0	First shutout by either team
88	December 27, 1998	Joe Louis Arena; Detroit, MI	Northern Michigan	8	Michigan Tech	1	Great Lakes Invitational consolation game
89	October 8, 1999	Berry Events Center; Marquette, MI	Northern Michigan	9	Michigan Tech	0	
90	October 9, 1999	MacInnes Student Ice Arena; Houghton, MI	Northern Michigan	3	Michigan Tech	0	
91	November 19, 1999	MacInnes Student Ice Arena; Houghton, MI	Northern Michigan	4	Michigan Tech	2	
92	November 20, 1999	Berry Events Center; Marquette, MI	Northern Michigan	4	Michigan Tech	2	
93	October 6, 2000	MacInnes Student Ice Arena; Houghton, MI	Tie	3	Tie	3	
94	December 8, 2000	MacInnes Student Ice Arena; Houghton, MI	Northern Michigan	4	Michigan Tech	1	
95	December 9, 2000	Berry Events Center; Marquette, MI	Northern Michigan	5	Michigan Tech	2	
96	January 5, 2001	Berry Events Center; Marquette, MI	Michigan Tech	4	Northern Michigan	2	
97	December 14, 2001	MacInnes Student Ice Arena; Houghton, MI	Michigan Tech	5	Northern Michigan	3	
98	December 15, 2001	Berry Events Center; Marquette, MI	Northern Michigan	6	Michigan Tech	1	
99	October 5, 2002	MacInnes Student Ice Arena; Houghton, MI	Northern Michigan	4	Michigan Tech	1	
100	December 13, 2002	Berry Events Center; Marquette, MI	Michigan Tech	3	Northern Michigan	2	
101	October 17, 2003	Berry Events Center; Marquette, MI	Northern Michigan	4	Michigan Tech	3	(OT)
102	October 18, 2003	MacInnes Student Ice Arena; Houghton, MI	Michigan Tech	7	Northern Michigan	6	(OT)
103	December 12, 2003	MacInnes Student Ice Arena; Houghton, MI	Tie	3	Tie	3	(OT)
104	December 13, 2003	Berry Events Center; Marquette, MI	Northern Michigan	2	Michigan Tech	0	
105	November 4, 2004	MacInnes Student Ice Arena; Houghton, MI	Tie	6	Tie	6	(OT)
106	November 6, 2004	Berry Events Center; Marquette, MI	Northern Michigan	6	Michigan Tech	3	
107	October 21, 2005	Berry Events Center; Marquette, MI	Northern Michigan	5	Michigan Tech	1	
108	October 22, 2005	MacInnes Student Ice Arena; Houghton, MI	Northern Michigan	2	Michigan Tech	1	
109	October 13, 2006	MacInnes Student Ice Arena; Houghton, MI	Michigan Tech	2	No. 20 Northern Michigan	1	
110	October 14, 2006	Berry Events Center; Marquette, MI	No. 20 Northern Michigan	1	Michigan Tech	0	
111	October 12, 2007	MacInnes Student Ice Arena; Houghton, MI	Northern Michigan	3	Michigan Tech	2	Superior Cup Semifinal
112	December 14, 2007	Berry Events Center; Marquette, MI	Tie	1	Tie	1	(OT)
113	December 15, 2007	MacInnes Student Ice Arena; Houghton, MI	Northern Michigan	2	Michigan Tech	0	
114	October 10, 2008	Berry Events Center; Marquette, MI	No. 16 Northern Michigan	5	Michigan Tech	2	Superior Cup Semifinal
115	December 19, 2008	MacInnes Student Ice Arena; Houghton, MI	Michigan Tech	2	Northern Michigan	1	
116	December 20, 2008	Berry Events Center; Marquette, MI	Michigan Tech	1	Northern Michigan	0	
117	October 9, 2009	MacInnes Student Ice Arena; Houghton, MI	Michigan Tech	5	Northern Michigan	3	Superior Cup Semifinal
118	December 18, 2009	Berry Events Center; Marquette, MI	Northern Michigan	2	Michigan Tech	1	
119	January 12, 2010	MacInnes Student Ice Arena; Houghton, MI	Tie	1	Tie	1	(OT)
120	October 8, 2010	Berry Events Center; Marquette, MI	Michigan Tech	4	Northern Michigan	3	(OT), Superior Cup Semifinal
121	October 12, 2010	MacInnes Student Ice Arena; Houghton, MI	Tie	4	Tie	4	(OT)
122	December 17, 2010	Berry Events Center; Marquette, MI	Northern Michigan	6	Michigan Tech	2	
123	December 16, 2011	Berry Events Center; Marquette, MI	Northern Michigan	4	Michigan Tech	1	
124	January 21, 2012	MacInnes Student Ice Arena; Houghton, MI	Northern Michigan	5	Michigan Tech	2	
125	December 4, 2012	Berry Events Center; Marquette, MI	Northern Michigan	2	Michigan Tech	1	
126	February 12, 2013	MacInnes Student Ice Arena; Houghton, MI	Michigan Tech	8	Northern Michigan	2	
127	October 25, 2013	Berry Events Center; Marquette, MI	Northern Michigan	2	Michigan Tech	0	WCHA play resumes
128	October 26, 2013	MacInnes Student Ice Arena; Houghton, MI	Michigan Tech	4	Northern Michigan	1	
129	February 21, 2014	MacInnes Student Ice Arena; Houghton, MI	Michigan Tech	7	Northern Michigan	4	
130	February 22, 2014	Berry Events Center; Marquette, MI	Michigan Tech	3	Northern Michigan	2	
131	January 9, 2015	Berry Events Center; Marquette, MI	Tie	3	Tie	3	(OT)
132	January 10, 2015	MacInnes Student Ice Arena; Houghton, MI	Northern Michigan	5	No. 8 Michigan Tech	4	(OT)
133	March 6, 2015	MacInnes Student Ice Arena; Houghton, MI	No. 4 Michigan Tech	5	Northern Michigan	1	
134	March 7, 2015	Berry Events Center; Marquette, MI	No. 4 Michigan Tech	3	Northern Michigan	1	
135	October 23, 2015	Berry Events Center; Marquette, MI	Northern Michigan	4	No. 16 Michigan Tech	1	
136	October 24, 2015	MacInnes Student Ice Arena; Houghton, MI	No. 16 Michigan Tech	3	Northern Michigan	1	
137	March 4, 2016	MacInnes Student Ice Arena; Houghton, MI	No. 13 Michigan Tech	4	Northern Michigan	0	
138	March 5, 2016	Berry Events Center; Marquette, MI	No. 13 Michigan Tech	5	Northern Michigan	1	
139	October 28, 2016	MacInnes Student Ice Arena; Houghton, MI	Michigan Tech	2	Northern Michigan	0	
140	October 29, 2016	Berry Events Center; Marquette, MI	Michigan Tech	5	Northern Michigan	1	
141	February 24, 2017	Berry Events Center; Marquette, MI	Michigan Tech	3	Northern Michigan	2	
142	February 25, 2017	MacInnes Student Ice Arena; Houghton, MI	Northern Michigan	5	Michigan Tech	3	
143	November 10, 2017	MacInnes Student Ice Arena; Houghton, MI	Michigan Tech	4	No. 20 Northern Michigan	1	
144	November 11, 2017	Berry Events Center; Marquette, MI	No. 20 Northern Michigan	4	Michigan Tech	0	
145	February 23, 2018	Berry Events Center; Marquette, MI	No. 16 Northern Michigan	2	Michigan Tech	1	
146	February 24, 2018	MacInnes Student Ice Arena; Houghton, MI	Michigan Tech	3	No. 16 Northern Michigan	2	
147	March 17, 2018	Berry Events Center; Marquette, MI	Michigan Tech	2	No. 16 Northern Michigan	0	WCHA Championship
148	December 7, 2018	Berry Events Center; Marquette, MI	Northern Michigan	5	No. 20 Michigan Tech	3	
149	December 8, 2018	MacInnes Student Ice Arena; Houghton, MI	No. 20 Michigan Tech	3	Northern Michigan	1	
150	March 1, 2019	MacInnes Student Ice Arena; Houghton, MI	Northern Michigan	4	Michigan Tech	2	
151	March 2, 2019	Berry Events Center; Marquette, MI	Northern Michigan	3	Michigan Tech	0	
152	November 22, 2019	MacInnes Student Ice Arena; Houghton, MI	Michigan Tech	3	No. 19 Northern Michigan	2	
153	November 23, 2019	Berry Events Center; Marquette, MI	Michigan Tech	3	No. 19 Northern Michigan	2	
154	February 28, 2020	Berry Events Center; Marquette, MI	Michigan Tech	8	Northern Michigan	4	
155	February 29, 2020	MacInnes Student Ice Arena; Houghton, MI	Northern Michigan	3	Michigan Tech	2	
156	March 6, 2020	Berry Events Center; Marquette, MI	Michigan Tech	4	Northern Michigan	1	WCHA Quarterfinals game 1
157	March 7, 2020	Berry Events Center; Marquette, MI	Michigan Tech	4	Northern Michigan	3	(3OT), WCHA Quarterfinals game 2
158	December 18, 2020	MacInnes Student Ice Arena; Houghton, MI	Michigan Tech	4	Northern Michigan	3	(OT)
159	December 19, 2020	Berry Events Center; Marquette, MI	Michigan Tech	3	Northern Michigan	1	
160	January 23, 2021	MacInnes Student Ice Arena; Houghton, MI	Michigan Tech	2	Northern Michigan	0	
161	January 25, 2021	Berry Events Center; Marquette, MI	No. 18 Michigan Tech	4	Northern Michigan	1	
162	February 26, 2021	MacInnes Student Ice Arena; Houghton, MI	No. 20 Michigan Tech	6	Northern Michigan	1	
163	February 27, 2021	Berry Events Center; Marquette, MI	No. 20 Michigan Tech	3	Northern Michigan	2	(OT)
164	November 12, 2021	MacInnes Student Ice Arena; Houghton, MI	Northern Michigan	5	Michigan Tech	2	CCHA play resumes (OT)
165	November 13, 2021	Berry Events Center; Marquette, MI	Michigan Tech	3	Northern Michigan	2	
166	February 1, 2022	MacInnes Student Ice Arena; Houghton, MI	No. 15 Michigan Tech	5	Northern Michigan	1	
167	February 8, 2022	Berry Events Center; Marquette, MI	No. 14 Michigan Tech	8	Northern Michigan	1	
168	December 2, 2022	Berry Events Center; Marquette, MI	Northern Michigan	4	No. 18 Michigan Tech	3	(OT)
169	December 3, 2022	MacInnes Student Ice Arena; Houghton, MI	No. 18 Michigan Tech	3	Northern Michigan	1	
170	January 27, 2023	MacInnes Student Ice Arena; Houghton, MI	No. 13 Michigan Tech	3	Northern Michigan	0	
171	January 28, 2023	Berry Events Center; Marquette, MI	No. 13 Michigan Tech	4	Northern Michigan	1	
172	January 27, 2023	MacInnes Student Ice Arena; Houghton, MI	Northern Michigan	4	No. 10 Michigan Tech	0	CCHA Semifinal
173	December 8, 2023	MacInnes Student Ice Arena; Houghton, MI	Michigan Tech	4	Northern Michigan	2	
174	December 9, 2023	Berry Events Center; Marquette, MI	Northern Michigan	3	Michigan Tech	1	
175	February 2, 2024	Berry Events Center; Marquette, MI	Northern Michigan	4	Michigan Tech	1	
176	February 3, 2024	MacInnes Student Ice Arena; Houghton, MI	Tie	3	Tie	3	(OT) (Note: NMU wins shootout 2–1)
177	November 1, 2024	Berry Events Center; Marquette, MI	Michigan Tech	3	Northern Michigan	0	
178	November 2, 2024	MacInnes Student Ice Arena; Houghton, MI	Michigan Tech	6	Northern Michigan	3	
179	December 30, 2024	Van Andel Arena, Grand Rapids, MI	Michigan Tech	4	Northern Michigan	3	Great Lakes Invitational consolation game
180	January 24, 2025	MacInnes Student Ice Arena; Houghton, MI	Michigan Tech	3	Northern Michigan	2	
181	January 25, 2025	Berry Events Center; Marquette, MI	Michigan Tech	4	Northern Michigan	0	
Series: Michigan Tech leads 87–80–14

== Series facts ==
Statistic	Michigan Tech	Northern Michigan
Games played	181	
Wins	87	80
Home wins	43	45
Road wins	39	33
Neutral site wins	5	2
Goals scored	571	602
Most goals scored in a game by one team	8 (1985, 1997, 2013, 2020)	10 (1985, 1990)
Most goals in a game by both teams	17 (January 26, 1990 – Northern Michigan 10, Michigan Tech 7)	
Fewest goals in a game by both teams	1 (2006, 2008)	
Fewest goals scored in a game by one team in a win	1 (December 20, 2008)	1 (October 14, 2006)
Most goals scored in a game by one team in a loss	7 (January 26, 1990)	6 (January 19, 1985, October 18, 2003)
Largest margin of victory	7 (February 8, 2022)	9 (October 8, 1999)
Longest winning streak	8 (March 6, 2020 – February 27, 2021)	7 (October 9, 1998 – November 20, 1999)
Longest unbeaten streak	8 (March 6, 2020 – February 27, 2021)	10 (October 9, 1998 – December 9, 2000)
