= List of Omaha Mavericks men's ice hockey seasons =

−This is a list of seasons completed by the University of Nebraska Omaha Mavericks men's ice hockey team.

Omaha has made four appearances in the NCAA Division I men's ice hockey tournament.

== Season-by-season results ==
NCAA D-I Champions	NAIA/NCAA Frozen Four	Conference regular season champions	Conference Playoff Champions

Season	Conference	Regular season (Note: Code explanation; GP—Games Played, W—Wins, L—Losses, T—Tied games, OTW—Overtime Wins, OTL—Overtime Loses, 3/SW—Win in 3 on 3 overtime or shootout, Pts—Points*)														Conference Tournament Results	National Tournament Results
Season	Conference	Conference									Overall					Conference Tournament Results	National Tournament Results
Season	Conference	GP	W	L	T	OTW	OTL	3/SW	Pts*	Finish	GP	W	L	T	%	Conference Tournament Results	National Tournament Results
Mike Kemp (1997–2009)
1997–98	Independent	-	-	-	-	-	-	-	-	-	33	12	18	3	.409		
1998–99	Independent	-	-	-	-	-	-	-	-	-	35	11	24	0	.314		
1999–00	CCHA	28	10	12	6	-	-	-	26	7th	42	16	19	7	.464	Won Quarterfinal series, 2–1 (Northern Michigan); Won Play-In, 3–1 (Bowling Green); Won Semifinal, 7–4 (Michigan); Lost Championship, 0–6 (Michigan State)	
2000–01	CCHA	28	15	10	3	-	-	-	33	4th	42	24	15	3	.607	Won Quarterfinal series, 2–1 (Ohio State); Lost Semifinal, 2–3 (Michigan)	
2001–02	CCHA	28	13	11	4	-	-	-	30	5th	41	21	16	4	.561	Lost First round series, 1–2 (Notre Dame)	
2002–03	CCHA	28	9	17	2	-	-	-	20	10th	40	13	22	5	.388	Lost First round series, 0–2 (Ohio State)	
2003–04	CCHA	28	5	19	4	-	-	-	14	12th	39	8	26	5	.269	Lost First round series, 1–2 (Michigan)	
2004–05	CCHA	28	13	11	4	-	-	-	30	4th	39	19	16	4	.538	Won First round series, 2–0 (Lake Superior State); Lost Quarterfinal, 0–5 (Michigan State)	
2005–06	CCHA	28	12	10	6	-	-	-	30	T–4th	41	20	15	6	.561	Won First round series, 2–0 (Bowling Green); Lost Quarterfinal series, 0–2 (Northern Michigan)	Lost Regional semifinal, 2–9 (Boston University)
2006–07	CCHA	28	13	11	4	-	-	-	30	5th	42	18	16	8	.524	Won First round series, 2–0 (Bowling Green); Lost Quarterfinal series, 0–2 (Michigan State)	
2007–08	CCHA	28	11	13	4	-	-	-	26	T–7th	40	17	19	4	.475	Won First round series, 2–1 (Alaska); Lost Quarterfinal series, 0–2 (Michigan)	
2008–09	CCHA	28	8	13	7	-	-	3	26	T–7th	40	15	17	8	.475	Won First round series, 2–0 (Ferris State); Lost Quarterfinal series, 0–2 (Notre Dame)	
Dean Blais (2009–2017)
2009–10	CCHA	28	13	12	3	-	-	2	44	6th	42	20	16	6	.548	Won First round series, 2–0 (Bowling Green); Lost Quarterfinal series, 0–2 (Ferris State)	
2010–11	WCHA	28	17	9	2	-	-	-	36	3rd	39	21	16	2	.564	Lost First round series, 0–2 (Bemidji State)	Lost Regional semifinal, 2–3 (OT) (Michigan)
Sports programs restyled from 'Nebraska–Omaha' to 'Omaha'
2011–12	WCHA	28	11	12	5	-	-	-	27	7th	38	14	18	6	.447	Lost First round series, 0–2 (St. Cloud State)	
2012–13	WCHA	28	14	12	2	-	-	-	30	7th	39	19	18	2	.513	Lost First round series, 1–2 (Minnesota State)	
2013–14	NCHC	24	13	9	2	-	-	1	42	3rd	37	17	18	2	.486	Lost Quarterfinal series, 1–2 (Denver)	
2014–15	NCHC	24	12	8	4	-	-	3	43	3rd	39	20	13	6	.590	Lost Quarterfinal series, 0–2 (St. Cloud State)	Won Regional semifinal, 4–1 (Harvard); Won Regional final, 4–0 (RIT); Lost National semifinal, 1–4 (Providence)
2015–16	NCHC	24	8	15	1	-	-	0	25	6th	36	18	17	1	.514	Lost First round series, 0–2 (Denver)	
2016–17	NCHC	24	9	13	2	-	-	0	29	6th	39	17	17	5	.500	Lost First round series, 1–2 (Western Michigan)	
Mike Gabinet (2017–Present)
2017–18	NCHC	24	10	13	1	-	-	0	31	T–5th	36	17	17	2	.500	Lost First round series, 0–2 (North Dakota)	
2018–19	NCHC	24	5	17	2	-	-	1	18	T–7th	36	9	24	3	.292	Lost First round series, 0–2 (Minnesota–Duluth)	
2019–20	NCHC	24	8	13	3	-	-	0	27	6th	36	14	17	5	.458	Postseason cancelled	
2020–21	NCHC	24	14	9	1	4	0	1	.556	4th	26	14	11	1	.558	Lost Quarterfinal, 4–5 (Denver)	Lost Regional semifinal, 2–7 (Minnesota)
2021–22	NCHC	24	11	13	0	2	1	0	32	6th	38	21	17	0	.553	Lost Quarterfinal series, 0–2 (Western Michigan)	
2022–23	NCHC	24	13	9	2	2	2	1	42	3rd	37	19	15	3	.554	Lost Quarterfinal series, 1–2 (North Dakota)	
2023–24	NCHC	24	13	8	3	5	0	3	40	5th	40	23	13	4	.625	Won First round series, 2–1 (Colorado College); Won Semifinal, 6–3 (North Dakota); Lost Championship, 1–4 (Denver)	Lost Regional semifinal, 2–3 (Minnesota)
2024–25	NCHC	24	14	9	1	1	1	1	44	4th	36	18	17	1	.514	Lost Quarterfinal series, 0–2 (North Dakota)	
Totals											GP	W	L	T	%	Championships	
Regular season											985	446	433	106	.507		
Conference Post-season											76	27	49	0	.355		
NCAA Post-season											7	2	5	0	.286	5 NCAA Tournament appearances	
Regular season and Post-season Record											1068	475	487	106	.494		

* Winning percentage is used when conference schedules are unbalanced.
