= 2020–21 Western Michigan Broncos men's ice hockey season =

- Conference: 6th NCHC
- Home ice: Lawson Arena

Rankings
- USCHO: NR
- USA Today: NR

Record
- Overall: 10–12–3
- Conference: 10–11–3–1–0–1
- Home: 5–2–0
- Road: 3–3–1
- Neutral: 2–7–2

Coaches and captains
- Head coach: Andy Murray
- Assistant coaches: Pat Ferschweiler; J. J. Crew; Will Massey
- Captain: Paul Washe
- Alternate captain(s): Kale Bennett; Ethen Frank; Josh Passolt

The 2020–21 Western Michigan Broncos men's ice hockey season was the 47th season of play for the program. They represented Western Michigan University in the 2020–21 NCAA Division I men's ice hockey season and for the 8th season in the National Collegiate Hockey Conference (NCHC). The Broncos were coached by Andy Murray, in his 10th season, and played their home games at Lawson Arena.

== Season ==
As a result of the ongoing COVID-19 pandemic the entire college ice hockey season was delayed. Because the NCAA had previously announced that all winter sports athletes would retain whatever eligibility they possessed through at least the following year, none of Western Michigan's players would lose a season of play. However, the NCAA also approved a change in its transfer regulations that would allow players to transfer and play immediately rather than having to sit out a season, as the rules previously required.

Western Michigan began the season playing a series of games in Omaha, Nebraska, along with the rest of the NCHC. Before the team could even finish its first game, the Broncos were hamstrung by an injury to their starting netminder, Brandon Bussi. The team turned to senior Austin Cain and, after a very rough start, he settled into the starting role. Cain played well at times but the team's compact schedule of games gave WMU few favors and by Christmas the team sat near the bottom of the conference with a 2–6–2 record. After getting swept by Miami at the beginning of January, freshman Alex Aslanidis was put in net and the team began to show signs of life. After nearly returning the favor to Miami, the Broncos swept #4 St. Cloud State and turned their season around virtually overnight. Aslanidis' performance, paired with the stellar play of Ronnie Attard, allowed Western Michigan to sweep another #4 team a few weeks later (Minnesota Duluth). In their final weekend of the regular season Bussi returned from his injury and swept Miami to put the team within one game of a .500 record.

Despite the teams vastly improved performance in the second half of the season, their record meant that the team had no real chance of making the NCAA tournament without winning the NCHC championship. The team had to get through Minnesota Duluth in the quarterfinals and the Broncos gave everything they had, taking a lead into the third period and then tying the game with less than a minute to play. WMU nearly matched UMD shot-for-shot but the final goal came from the Bulldogs and Western Michigan's season was over.

Jacob Bauer, Rhett Kingston and Jared Kucharek sat out the season.

== Departures ==
Player	Position	Nationality	Reason
Wade Allison	Forward	Canada	Graduation (Signed with Philadelphia Flyers)
Luke Bafia	Defenseman	United States	Graduation (Signed with Kansas City Mavericks)
Ben Blacker	Goaltender	Canada	Graduation
Lawton Courtnall	Forward	United States	Graduation (Signed with Wheeling Nailers)
Dawson DiPietro	Forward	United States	Graduation (Signed with Buffalo Sabres)
Cam Lee	Defenseman	Canada	Graduation (Signed with Pittsburgh Penguins)
Will Massey	Goaltender	United States	Graduation (Retired)
Hugh McGing	Forward	United States	Graduation (Signed with St. Louis Blues)
Cameron Orchard	Forward	United States	Left program
Austin Rueschhoff	Forward	United States	Signed professional contract (New York Rangers)
Mattias Samuelsson	Defenseman	United States	Signed professional contract (Buffalo Sabres)

== Recruiting ==
Player	Position	Nationality	Age	Notes
Alex Aslanidis	Goaltender	United States	19	Moorestown, NJ
Jacob Bauer	Defenseman	United States	18	Detroit, MI
Trevor Bishop	Forward	United States	21	Rochester Hills, MI
Cédric Fiedler	Defenseman	United States	19	Boca Raton, FL
Aidan Fulp	Defenseman	United States	20	Indianapolis, IN
Ty Glover	Forward	Canada	20	Salford, GBR
Luke Grainger	Forward	Canada	20	Montreal, QC
Chad Hillebrand	Forward	United States	21	Park Ridge, IL
Daniel Hilsendager	Defenseman	Canada	20	Lloydminster, SK
Cam Knuble	Forward	United States	20	Grand Rapids, MI
Hugh Larkin	Forward	United States	21	Livonia, MI
Tim Washe	Forward	United States	19	Detroit, MI
Jarred White	Forward	Canada	21	Edmonton, AB

== Roster ==
As of March 1, 2021

No.	Nat.	Player	Class	Pos	Height	Weight	DoB	Hometown	Previous team	NHL rights
1	(Canada)	Austin Cain	Senior	G	6' 4" (1.93 m)	187 lb (85 kg)	1996-09-12	Ottawa, Ontario	Whitby Fury (OJHL)	—
2	(United States)	Kale Bennett (A)	Senior (RS)	D	6' 0" (1.83 m)	200 lb (91 kg)	1995-11-30	St. Louis, Missouri	Nanaimo Clippers (BCHL)	—
3	(United States)	Michael Joyaux	Junior	D	5' 10" (1.78 m)	181 lb (82 kg)	1997-02-13	Bloomingdale, Illinois	Youngstown Phantoms (USHL)	—
4	(United States)	Cam Knuble	Freshman	F	6' 0" (1.83 m)	200 lb (91 kg)	2000-07-23	Grand Rapids, Michigan	Muskegon Lumberjacks (USHL)	—
6	(United States)	Scooter Brickey	Sophomore	D	6' 3" (1.91 m)	207 lb (94 kg)	1999-05-27	Burtchville, Michigan	Des Moines Buccaneers (USHL)	—
7	(United States)	Ronnie Attard	Sophomore	D	6' 4" (1.93 m)	210 lb (95 kg)	1999-03-20	White Lake, Michigan	Tri-City Storm (USHL)	PHI, 72nd overall 2019
8	(Canada)	Matteo Pecchia	Freshman	F	5' 11" (1.8 m)	192 lb (87 kg)	2000-06-05	Nobleton, Ontario	Mississauga Chargers (OJHL)	—
9	(Canada)	Luke Grainger	Freshman	F	5' 10" (1.78 m)	180 lb (82 kg)	1999-09-03	Montreal, Quebec	Hawkesbury Hawks (CCHL)	—
10	(United States)	Chad Hillebrand	Freshman	F	6' 4" (1.93 m)	200 lb (91 kg)	1999-01-22	Park Ridge, Illinois	Green Bay Gamblers (USHL)	—
11	(Canada)	Rhett Kingston	Junior	F	6' 1" (1.85 m)	195 lb (88 kg)	1997-11-04	Black Diamond, Alberta	Salmon Arm Silverbacks (BCHL)	—
12	(United States)	Cole Gallant	Junior	F	5' 10" (1.78 m)	190 lb (86 kg)	1998-03-14	Dover, Florida	Omaha Lancers (USHL)	—
13	(Canada)	Drew Worrad	Junior	F	6' 2" (1.88 m)	186 lb (84 kg)	1997-06-30	Birr, Ontario	Steinbach Pistons (MJHL)	—
14	(United States)	Jason Polin	Sophomore	F	6' 0" (1.83 m)	198 lb (90 kg)	1999-06-17	Holt, Michigan	Cedar Rapids RoughRiders (USHL)	—
15	(Canada)	Daniel Hilsendager	Freshman	D	6' 1" (1.85 m)	202 lb (92 kg)	2000-03-30	Lloydminster, Saskatchewan	Omaha Lancers (USHL)	—
16	(United States)	Tim Washe	Freshman	F	6' 3" (1.91 m)	210 lb (95 kg)	2001-08-25	Clarkston, Michigan	Nanaimo Clippers (BCHL)	—
17	(Switzerland)	Cédric Fiedler	Freshman	D	6' 3" (1.91 m)	204 lb (93 kg)	2001-04-20	Zug, Switzerland	Fargo Force (USHL)	—
18	(Canada)	Brett Van Os	Senior	F	6' 2" (1.88 m)	210 lb (95 kg)	1996-02-21	St. Albert, Alberta	Calgary Canucks (AJHL)	—
19	(United States)	Lukas Samuelsson	Senior	F	6' 0" (1.83 m)	177 lb (80 kg)	1996-10-08	Voorhees, New Jersey	Toronto Predators (GMHL)	—
20	(Canada)	Jamie Rome	Junior	F	6' 2" (1.88 m)	211 lb (96 kg)	1998-10-03	Cochrane, Alberta	Victoria Grizzlies (BCHL)	—
21	(United States)	Josh Passolt (A)	Senior	F	6' 0" (1.83 m)	180 lb (82 kg)	1996-09-13	Hayward, Wisconsin	Sioux Falls Stampede (USHL)	—
22	(United States)	Trevor Bishop	Freshman	F	6' 0" (1.83 m)	185 lb (84 kg)	1999-01-23	Rochester Hills, Michigan	Victoria Grizzlies (BCHL)	—
23	(United States)	Paul Washe (C)	Senior	F	6' 1" (1.85 m)	201 lb (91 kg)	1998-11-27	Clarkston, Michigan	Fargo Force (USHL)	—
24	(United States)	Aidan Fulp	Freshman	D	6' 3" (1.91 m)	210 lb (95 kg)	2000-02-29	Indianapolis, Indiana	Dubuque Fighting Saints (USHL)	—
25	(United States)	Jared Kucharek	Junior	D	6' 4" (1.93 m)	203 lb (92 kg)	1998-05-23	Royal Oak, Michigan	Madison Capitols (USHL)	—
26	(United States)	Ethen Frank (A)	Senior	F	5' 10" (1.78 m)	175 lb (79 kg)	1998-02-05	Papillion, Nebraska	Lincoln Stars (USHL)	—
27	(Canada)	Ty Glover	Freshman	F	6' 3" (1.91 m)	200 lb (91 kg)	2000-10-01	London, Ontario	Lincoln Stars (USHL)	—
28	(United States)	Hugh Larkin	Freshman	F	6' 2" (1.88 m)	205 lb (93 kg)	1999-03-27	Livonia, Michigan	Austin Bruins (NAHL)	—
29	(Canada)	Jarred White	Freshman	F	5' 10" (1.78 m)	200 lb (91 kg)	1999-05-21	Edmonton, Alberta	Sherwood Park Crusaders (AJHL)	—
30	(United States)	Brandon Bussi	Sophomore	G	6' 5" (1.96 m)	210 lb (95 kg)	1998-06-25	Sound Beach, New York	Muskegon Lumberjacks (USHL)	—
31	(Canada)	Ross Hawryluk	Freshman	G	6' 4" (1.93 m)	208 lb (94 kg)	2001-03-19	Lloydminster, Alberta	Nipawin Hawks (SJHL)	—
35	(United States)	Alex Aslanidis	Freshman	G	6' 5" (1.96 m)	205 lb (93 kg)	2001-01-20	Morristown, New Jersey	Navan Grads (CCHL)	—
	(United States)	Jacob Bauer	Freshman	D	6' 3" (1.91 m)	202 lb (92 kg)	2002-02-25	Milford, Michigan	Lincoln Stars (USHL)	—

== Standings ==
2020–21 National Collegiate Hockey Conference Standings
	Conference record											Overall record					
	GP	W	L	T	OTW	OTL	3/SW	PTS	PT%	GF	GA	GP	W	L	T	GF	GA
#5 North Dakota †*	24	18	5	1	2	1	0	54	.750	94	47	29	22	6	1	114	57
#2 St. Cloud State	24	15	9	0	3	3	0	45	.625	78	64	31	20	11	0	101	84
#3 Minnesota Duluth	24	13	9	2	1	2	1	43	.597	72	54	28	15	11	2	84	66
#13 Omaha	24	14	9	1	4	0	1	40	.556	79	69	26	14	11	1	85	81
Denver	22	9	12	1	0	2	1	31	.470	61	60	24	11	13	1	67	66
Western Michigan	24	10	11	3	1	0	1	33	.458	73	84	25	10	12	3	77	89
Colorado College	22	4	16	2	0	2	2	18	.273	35	77	23	4	17	2	36	79
Miami	24	5	17	2	0	1	0	18	.250	46	83	25	5	18	2	48	89
Championship: March 16, 2021 † indicates conference regular season champion (Penrose Cup) * indicates conference tournament champion (Frozen Faceoff Championship Trophy); Rankings: USCHO.com Top 20 Poll

== Schedule and results ==
Date	Time	Opponent^{#}	Rank^{#}	Site	TV	Decision	Result	Attendance	Record
Regular season
December 1	8:07 p.m.	vs. St. Cloud State	#17	Baxter Arena • Omaha, Nebraska		Cain	L 3–4	0	0–1–0 (0–1–0)
December 3	8:35 p.m.	vs. Omaha	#17	Baxter Arena • Omaha, Nebraska		Cain	L 2–10	0	0–2–0 (0–2–0)
December 6	1:05 p.m.	vs. #1 North Dakota	#17	Baxter Arena • Omaha, Nebraska		Cain	L 2–8	0	0–3–0 (0–3–0)
December 8	12:35 p.m.	vs. Colorado College		Baxter Arena • Omaha, Nebraska		Cain	T 3–3 ^{SOL}	0	0–3–1 (0–3–1)
December 9	4:35 p.m.	vs. #13 St. Cloud State		Baxter Arena • Omaha, Nebraska		Cain	W 2–1	0	1–3–1 (1–3–1)
December 11	8:35 p.m.	vs. Colorado College		Baxter Arena • Omaha, Nebraska	AT&T RM	Cain	W 5–2	0	2–3–1 (2–3–1)
December 13	5:05 p.m.	vs. #1 North Dakota		Baxter Arena • Omaha, Nebraska		Cain	L 3–6	0	2–4–1 (2–4–1)
December 15	4:35 p.m.	vs. #8 Denver		Baxter Arena • Omaha, Nebraska	Altitude	Cain	L 2–3	0	2–5–1 (2–5–1)
December 18	4:35 p.m.	vs. #17 Omaha		Baxter Arena • Omaha, Nebraska		Cain	L 5–6	0	2–6–1 (2–6–1)
December 19	5:05 p.m.	vs. #8 Denver		Baxter Arena • Omaha, Nebraska	Altitude	Cain	T 3–3 ^{SOL}	0	2–6–2 (2–6–2)
January 2	5:05 p.m.	vs. Miami		Lawson Arena • Kalamazoo, Michigan		Cain	L 1–3	0	2–7–2 (2–7–2)
January 3	5:05 p.m.	vs. Miami		Lawson Arena • Kalamazoo, Michigan		Cain	L 1–5	0	2–8–2 (2–8–2)
January 8	7:00 p.m.	at Miami		Steve Cady Arena • Oxford, Ohio		Aslanidis	W 4–1	0	3–8–2 (3–8–2)
January 9	5:00 p.m.	at Miami		Steve Cady Arena • Oxford, Ohio		Aslanidis	T 3–3 ^{SOW}	0	3–8–3 (3–8–3)
January 15	7:05 p.m.	vs. #4 St. Cloud State		Lawson Arena • Kalamazoo, Michigan		Aslanidis	W 6–2	0	4–8–3 (4–8–3)
January 16	7:41 p.m.	vs. #4 St. Cloud State		Lawson Arena • Kalamazoo, Michigan	CBSSN	Aslanidis	W 3–1	0	5–8–3 (5–8–3)
January 23	7:00 p.m.	at #7 Minnesota Duluth		AMSOIL Arena • Duluth, Minnesota		Aslanidis	L 1–5	150	5–9–3 (5–9–3)
January 24	5:00 p.m.	at #7 Minnesota Duluth		AMSOIL Arena • Duluth, Minnesota		Aslanidis	L 1–4	150	5–10–3 (5–10–3)
February 5	8:30 p.m.	at #4 St. Cloud State		Herb Brooks National Hockey Center • St. Cloud, Minnesota		Aslanidis	L 1–5	153	5–11–3 (5–11–3)
February 6	7:07 p.m.	at #4 St. Cloud State		Herb Brooks National Hockey Center • St. Cloud, Minnesota		Cain	W 5–4 ^{OT}	157	6–11–3 (6–11–3)
February 12	6:05 p.m.	vs. #4 Minnesota Duluth		Lawson Arena • Kalamazoo, Michigan		Aslanidis	W 4–0	125	7–11–3 (7–11–3)
February 13	4:05 p.m.	vs. #4 Minnesota Duluth		Lawson Arena • Kalamazoo, Michigan		Aslanidis	W 4–1	125	8–11–3 (8–11–3)
February 26	6:05 p.m.	vs. Miami		Lawson Arena • Kalamazoo, Michigan		Bussi	W 5–2	125	9–11–3 (9–11–3)
February 27	2:00 p.m.	at Miami		Steve Cady Arena • Oxford, Ohio	CBSSN	Bussi	W 4–2	0	10–11–3 (10–11–3)
NCHC tournament
March 13	8:30 p.m.	vs. #9 Minnesota Duluth		Ralph Engelstad Arena • Grand Forks, North Dakota		Bussi	L 4–5 ^{OT}	2,167	10–12–3
*Non-conference game. ^{#}Rankings from USCHO.com Poll. All times are in Eastern Time.

== Scoring statistics ==
Name	Position	Games	Goals	Assists	Points	PIM
Drew Worrad	C	25	5	18	23	8
Ronnie Attard	D	25	8	14	22	8
Ethen Frank	C	24	13	8	21	4
Paul Washe	C	25	8	13	21	18
Josh Passolt	LW	25	7	12	19	14
Cole Gallant	RW	25	5	13	18	2
Jason Polin	F	23	7	7	14	4
Michael Joyaux	D	25	4	10	14	8
Ty Glover	C	24	5	6	11	10
Aidan Fulp	D	25	0	11	11	12
Brett Van Os	LW	24	4	4	8	37
Luke Grainger	F	25	4	4	8	12
Scooter Brickey	D	25	2	4	6	16
Jamie Rome	F	24	2	1	3	12
Cédric Fiedler	D	15	0	3	3	6
Chad Hillebrand	F	12	1	1	2	4
Hugh Larkin	RW	19	1	1	2	7
Jarred White	LW	14	0	2	2	22
Daniel Hilsendager	D	21	0	2	2	4
Tim Washe	C	13	1	0	1	10
Kale Bennett	D	23	0	1	1	4
Trevor Bishop	F	1	0	0	0	0
Brandon Bussi	G	4	0	0	0	0
Lukas Samuelsson	F	5	0	0	0	0
Cam Knuble	F	8	0	0	0	4
Alex Aslanidis	G	13	0	0	0	0
Austin Cain	G	15	0	0	0	0
Bench	-	-	-	-	-	8
Total			77	135	212	234

== Goaltending statistics ==
Name	Games	Minutes	Wins	Losses	Ties	Goals against	Saves	Shut-outs	SV %	GAA
Brandon Bussi	4	211	2	1	0	10	80	0	.889	2.84
Alex Aslanidis	13	613	5	3	1	31	231	1	.882	3.03
Austin Cain	15	683	3	8	2	46	308	0	.870	4.04
Empty Net	-	14	-	-	-	2	-	-	-	-
Total	25	1522	10	12	3	89	619	1	.874	3.51

== Rankings ==
Poll	Week																					
Poll	Pre	1	2	3	4	5	6	7	8	9	10	11	12	13	14	15	16	17	18	19	20	21 (Final)
USCHO.com	18	17	17	17	NR	NR	NR	NR	NR	NR	NR	NR	NR	NR	NR	NR	NR	NR	NR	NR	-	NR
USA Today	NR	NR	NR	NR	NR	NR	NR	NR	NR	NR	NR	NR	NR	NR	NR	NR	NR	NR	NR	NR	NR	NR

USCHO did not release a poll in week 20.

== Awards and honors ==
Player	Award	Ref
Ronnie Attard	AHCA West First Team All-American	
Ronnie Attard	NCHC Offensive Defenseman of the Year	
Kale Bennett	NCHC Scholar-Athlete of the Year	
Ronnie Attard	NCHC First Team	
Ethen Frank	NCHC Third Team	
