= 2020–21 North Dakota Fighting Hawks men's ice hockey season =

NCHC, Champion NCHC Tournament, Champion NCAA Tournament, Regional final
- Conference: 1st NCHC
- Home ice: Ralph Engelstad Arena

Rankings
- USCHO.com: 5
- USA Today/ US Hockey Magazine: 5

Record
- Overall: 22–6–1
- Conference: 18–5–1–2–1–0
- Home: 9–1–0
- Road: 5–2–0
- Neutral: 8–3–1

Coaches and captains
- Head coach: Brad Berry
- Assistant coaches: Dane Jackson; Karl Goehring; Jason Ulmer
- Captain: Jordan Kawaguchi
- Alternate captain(s): Jasper Weatherby; Matt Kiersted; Jacob Bernard-Docker; Mark Senden

The 2020–21 North Dakota Fighting Hawks men's ice hockey season was the 81st season of play for the program and the 8th in the NCHC conference. The Fighting Hawks represented the University of North Dakota and were coached by Brad Berry, in his 6th season. The first ten regular season games were played in a "pod" in Omaha, Nebraska at Baxter Arena during the COVID-19 pandemic. North Dakota won its 4th Penrose Cup as regular season champions of the NCHC. UND won the NCHC tournament for the first time in program history.

== Season ==
As a result of the ongoing COVID-19 pandemic the entire college ice hockey season was delayed. Because the NCAA had previously announced that all winter sports athletes would retain whatever eligibility they possessed through at least the following year, none of North Dakota's players would lose a season of play. However, the NCAA also approved a change in its transfer regulations that would allow players to transfer and play immediately rather than having to sit out a season, as the rules previously required.

== Departures ==
Player	Position	Nationality	Cause
Dixon Bowen	Forward	United States	Graduation (Signed with HK Spišská Nová Ves)
Casey Johnson	Defenseman	United States	Graduation (Signed with Macon Mayhem)
Wes Michaud	Forward	United States	Graduation (Signed with Manitoba Moose)
Andrew Peski	Defenseman	Canada	Graduation (Signed with Providence Bruins)
Colton Poolman	Defenseman	United States	Graduation (Signed with Calgary Flames)
Cole Smith	Forward	United States	Graduation (Signed with Nashville Predators)
Jonny Tychonick	Defenseman	Canada	Transferred to Omaha
Zach Yon	Forward	United States	Graduation

== Recruiting ==
Player	Position	Nationality	Age	Notes
Brendan Budy	Forward	Canada	20	Langley, BC; transfer from Denver
Riese Gaber	Forward	Canada	20	Gilbert Plains, MB
Louis Jamernik	Forward	Canada	20	Calgary, AB
Tyler Kleven	Defenseman	United States	18	Fargo, ND; selected 44th overall in 2020
Cooper Moore	Defenseman	United States	19	Cos Cob, CT; selected 128th overall in 2019
Griffin Ness	Forward	United States	20	Wayzata, MN
Jake Sanderson	Defenseman	United States	18	Whitefish, MT; selected 5th overall in 2020

== Roster ==
As of December 31, 2020.

No.	Nat.	Player	Class	Pos	Height	Weight	DoB	Hometown	Previous team	NHL rights
1		Peter Thome	Senior	G	6' 4" (1.93 m)	198 lb (90 kg)	1997-05-24	Minneapolis, Minnesota	Waterloo Black Hawks (USHL)	CBJ, 155th overall 2016
2		Gabe Bast	Senior	D	5' 10" (1.78 m)	184 lb (83 kg)	1996-12-20	Red Deer, Alberta	Penticton Vees (BCHL)	—
3		Matt Kiersted (A)	Senior	D	6' 0" (1.83 m)	175 lb (79 kg)	1998-04-14	Elk River, Minnesota	Chicago Steel (USHL)	—
4		Cooper Moore	Freshman	D	6' 1" (1.85 m)	182 lb (83 kg)	2001-02-16	Cos Cob, Connecticut	Chilliwack Chiefs (BCHL)	DET, 128th overall 2019
8		Harrison Blaisdell	Sophomore	F	5' 11" (1.8 m)	189 lb (86 kg)	2001-03-18	Regina, Saskatchewan	Chilliwack Chiefs (BCHL)	WPG, 134th overall 2019
9		Brendan Budy	Sophomore	F	5' 10" (1.78 m)	180 lb (82 kg)	2000-06-06	Langley, British Columbia	Langley Rivermen (BCHL)	—
10		Gavin Hain	Junior	F	6' 0" (1.83 m)	184 lb (83 kg)	2000-04-03	Grand Rapids, Minnesota	USNTDP (USHL)	PHI, 174th overall 2018
11		Griffin Ness	Freshman	F	5' 11" (1.8 m)	174 lb (79 kg)	1999-12-10	Wayzata, Minnesota	Waterloo Blackhawks (USHL)	—
13		Carson Albrecht	Sophomore	F	5' 10" (1.78 m)	193 lb (88 kg)	1998-05-23	Martensville, Saskatchewan	Melfort Mustangs (SJHL)	—
14		Jasper Weatherby (A)	Junior	F	6' 3" (1.91 m)	212 lb (96 kg)	1998-01-22	Ashland, Oregon	Wenatchee Wild (BCHL)	SJS, 102nd overall 2018
15		Ethan Frisch	Sophomore	D	5' 11" (1.8 m)	187 lb (85 kg)	2000-10-29	Moorhead, Minnesota	Fargo Force (USHL)	—
16		Grant Mismash	Senior	F	6' 1" (1.85 m)	181 lb (82 kg)	1999-02-19	Edina, Minnesota	USNTDP (USHL)	NSH, 61st overall 2017
17		Riese Gaber	Freshman	F	5' 8" (1.73 m)	161 lb (73 kg)	1999-10-10	Gilbert Plains, Manitoba	Dubuque Fighting Saints (USHL)	—
18		Collin Adams	Senior	F	5' 9" (1.75 m)	197 lb (89 kg)	1998-04-24	Brighton, Michigan	Muskegon Lumberjacks (USHL)	NYI, 170th overall 2016
19		Mark Senden (A)	Junior	F	5' 11" (1.8 m)	194 lb (88 kg)	1998-01-22	Medina, Minnesota	Fargo Force (USHL)	—
20		Josh Rieger	Senior	D	6' 0" (1.83 m)	181 lb (82 kg)	1996-04-02	Regina, Saskatchewan	Estevan Bruins (SJHL)	—
21		Jackson Keane	Senior	F	5' 9" (1.75 m)	164 lb (74 kg)	1997-04-08	Winnipeg, Manitoba	Penticton Vees (BCHL)	—
22		Shane Pinto	Sophomore	F	6' 2" (1.88 m)	191 lb (87 kg)	2000-11-12	Franklin Square, New York	Tri-City Storm (USHL)	OTT, 32nd overall 2019
24		Jacob Bernard-Docker (A)	Junior	D	6' 1" (1.85 m)	195 lb (88 kg)	2000-06-30	Canmore, Alberta	Okotoks Oilers (AJHL)	OTT, 26th overall 2018
25		Tyler Kleven	Freshman	D	6' 4" (1.93 m)	198 lb (90 kg)	2002-01-10	Fargo, North Dakota	USNTDP (USHL)	OTT, 44th overall 2020
26		Jake Sanderson	Freshman	D	6' 0" (1.83 m)	183 lb (83 kg)	2002-07-08	Whitefish, Montana	USNTDP (USHL)	OTT, 5th overall 2020
27		Louis Jamernik	Freshman	F	5' 11" (1.8 m)	190 lb (86 kg)	2000-02-22	Calgary, Alberta	Okotoks (AJHL)	—
28		Judd Caulfield	Sophomore	F	6' 3" (1.91 m)	203 lb (92 kg)	2001-03-19	Grand Forks, North Dakota	USNTDP (USHL)	PIT, 145th overall 2019
29		Jordan Kawaguchi (C)	Senior	F	5' 9" (1.75 m)	188 lb (85 kg)	1997-05-04	Abbotsford, British Columbia	Chilliwack Chiefs (BCHL)	—
31		Adam Scheel	Junior	G	6' 3" (1.91 m)	190 lb (86 kg)	1999-05-01	Lakewood, Ohio	Penticton Vees (BCHL)	—
33		Harrison Feeney	Sophomore (RS)	G	6' 1" (1.85 m)	217 lb (98 kg)	1998-02-04	Lafayette Hill, Pennsylvania	Lone Star Brahmas (NAHL)	—

== Standings ==
2020–21 National Collegiate Hockey Conference Standings
	Conference record											Overall record					
	GP	W	L	T	OTW	OTL	3/SW	PTS	PT%	GF	GA	GP	W	L	T	GF	GA
#5 North Dakota †*	24	18	5	1	2	1	0	54	.750	94	47	29	22	6	1	114	57
#2 St. Cloud State	24	15	9	0	3	3	0	45	.625	78	64	31	20	11	0	101	84
#3 Minnesota Duluth	24	13	9	2	1	2	1	43	.597	72	54	28	15	11	2	84	66
#13 Omaha	24	14	9	1	4	0	1	40	.556	79	69	26	14	11	1	85	81
Denver	22	9	12	1	0	2	1	31	.470	61	60	24	11	13	1	67	66
Western Michigan	24	10	11	3	1	0	1	33	.458	73	84	25	10	12	3	77	89
Colorado College	22	4	16	2	0	2	2	18	.273	35	77	23	4	17	2	36	79
Miami	24	5	17	2	0	1	0	18	.250	46	83	25	5	18	2	48	89
Championship: March 16, 2021 † indicates conference regular season champion (Penrose Cup) * indicates conference tournament champion (Frozen Faceoff Championship Trophy); Rankings: USCHO.com Top 20 Poll

== Schedule and results ==
Date	Time	Opponent^{#}	Rank^{#}	Site	TV	Decision	Result	Attendance	Record
Regular season
December 2	3:35 PM	vs. Miami	#1	Baxter Arena • Omaha, Nebraska		Scheel	W 2–0	0	1-0-0 (1-0-0-0)
December 4	7:35 PM	vs. #4 Denver	#1	Baxter Arena • Omaha, Nebraska		Scheel	W 4–3 ^{OT}	0	2–0–0 (1-0-1-0)
December 6	12:05 PM	vs. #17 Western Michigan	#1	Baxter Arena • Omaha, Nebraska		Thome	W 8–2	0	3–0–0 (2-0-1-0)
December 8	3:35 PM	vs. #9 Denver	#1	Baxter Arena • Omaha, Nebraska		Scheel	L 2–3	0	3-1-0 (2-1-1-0)
December 10	7:35 PM	vs. #3 Minnesota Duluth	#1	Baxter Arena • Omaha, Nebraska		Scheel	T 2–2 ^{SOL}	0	3-1-1 (2-1-1-1)
December 12	4:05 PM	vs. #13 St. Cloud State	#1	Baxter Arena • Omaha, Nebraska		Thome	L 3–5	0	3–2-1 (2-2-1-1)
December 13	4:05 PM	vs. Western Michigan	#1	Baxter Arena • Omaha, Nebraska		Scheel	W 6–3	0	4-2-1 (3-2-1-1)
December 16	7:35 PM	vs. #9 St. Cloud State	#4	Baxter Arena • Omaha, Nebraska		Scheel	W 4–3 ^{OT}	0	5-2-1 (3-2-2-1)
December 19	12:05 PM	vs. #3 Minnesota Duluth	#4	Baxter Arena • Omaha, Nebraska		Scheel	W 2–1	0	6-2-1 (4-2-2-1)
December 20	8:05 PM	vs. Miami	#4	Baxter Arena • Omaha, Nebraska		Scheel	W 6–2	0	7-2-1 (5-2-2-1)
January 10	8:00 PM	at Colorado College	#3	Colorado Springs World Arena • Colorado Springs, Colorado		Scheel	W 3–0	0	8-2-1 (6-2-2-1)
January 11	8:00 PM	at Colorado College	#3	Colorado Springs World Arena • Colorado Springs, Colorado		Scheel	W 2–1	0	9-2-1 (7-2-2-1)
January 17	7:05 PM	at #18 Denver	#2	Magness Arena • Denver, Colorado		Scheel	L 1–4	0	9-3-1 (7-3-2-1)
January 18	7:05 PM	at #19 Denver	#3	Magness Arena • Denver, Colorado		Scheel	W 5–1	0	10-3-1 (8-3-2-1)
January 23	6:07 PM	Colorado College	#3	Ralph Engelstad Arena • Grand Forks, North Dakota		Scheel	W 4–1	2,008	11-3-1 (9-3-2-1)
January 24	6:07 PM	Colorado College	#3	Ralph Engelstad Arena • Grand Forks, North Dakota		Scheel	W 5–0	1,775	12-3-1 (10-3-2-1)
January 29	6:07 PM	at #9 Omaha	#2	Baxter Arena • Omaha, Nebraska		Scheel	W 6–2	1,429	13-3-1 (11-3-2-1)
January 30	6:07 PM	at #9 Omaha	#2	Baxter Arena • Omaha, Nebraska		Scheel	L 4–5	1,771	13-4-1 (11-4-2-1)
February 12	7:30 PM	Denver	#2	Ralph Engelstad Arena • Grand Forks, North Dakota		Scheel	W 3–0	2,286	14-4-1 (12-4-2-1)
February 13	6:00 PM	Denver	#2	Ralph Engelstad Arena • Grand Forks, North Dakota		Thome	W 5–2	2,466	15-4-1 (13-4-2-1)
February 19	7:37 PM	#9 Omaha	#2	Ralph Engelstad Arena • Grand Forks, North Dakota		Scheel	W 4–1	2,410	16-4-1 (14-4-2-1)
February 20	6:07 PM	#9 Omaha	#2	Ralph Engelstad Arena • Grand Forks, North Dakota		Scheel	W 7–1	2,514	17-4-1 (15-4-2-1)
February 26	7:07 PM	at #11 Omaha	#2	Baxter Arena • Omaha, Nebraska		Scheel	W 4–2	1,979	18-4-1 (16-4-2-1)
March 5	7:30 PM	#12 Omaha	#2	Ralph Engelstad Arena • Grand Forks, North Dakota		Thome	L 2–3 ^{OT}	2,723	18-5-1 (16-4-3-1)
NCHC Tournament
March 12	7:30 PM	vs. Miami*	#2	Ralph Engelstad Arena • Grand Forks, North Dakota (NCHC quarterfinals)		Scheel	W 6–2	2,763	19-5-1 (16-4-3-1)
March 15	8:00 PM	vs. Denver*	#2	Ralph Engelstad Arena • Grand Forks, North Dakota (NCHC semifinals)	CBSSN	Scheel	W 2–1 ^{OT}	2,509	20-5-1 (16-4-3-1)
March 16	7:30 PM	vs. #8 St. Cloud State*	#2	Ralph Engelstad Arena • Grand Forks, North Dakota (NCHC Final)	CBSSN	Scheel	W 5–3	3,157	21-5-1 (16-4-3-1)
NCAA Tournament
March 26	7:30 PM	vs. #4 AIC*	#1	Scheels Arena • Fargo, North Dakota (NCAA Midwest Regional semifinals)	ESPN3	Scheel	W 5–1	1,435	22-5-1 (16-4-3-1)
March 16	6:30 PM	vs. #3 Minnesota Duluth*	#1	Scheels Arena • Fargo, North Dakota (NCAA Midwest Regional final)	ESPNU	Scheel	L 3–2 ^{5OT}	1,722	22-6-1 (16-4-3-1)

== Scoring statistics ==
Name	Position	Games	Goals	Assists	Points	PIM
Jordan Kawaguchi	C	10	3	10	13	16
Matt Kiersted	D	10	2	7	9	12
Shane Pinto	C	10	5	8	13	0
Riese Gaber	F	10	7	2	9	10
Collin Adams	LW	10	4	5	9	4
Jacob Bernard-Docker	D	10	1	4	5	6
Grant Mismash	C/LW	10	4	6	10	8
Brendan Budy	LW	10	2	2	4	17
Jasper Weatherby	C/LW	10	3	3	6	2
Jake Sanderson	D	3	1	2	3	0
Judd Caulfield	F	7	0	0	0	0
Harrison Blaisdell	C	3	0	0	0	2
Mark Senden	C	10	1	4	5	4
Cooper Moore	D	8	0	2	2	2
Griffin Ness	C/RW	9	0	2	2	2
Gavin Hain	F	10	2	1	3	2
Tyler Kleven	D	3	1	0	1	2
Gabe Bast	D	9	1	2	3	6
Jackson Keane	C	8	0	0	0	0
Ethan Frisch	D	8	2	3	5	4
Carson Albrecht	LW	8	0	0	0	2
Adam Scheel	G	9	0	1	1	0
Josh Rieger	D	8	0	0	0	11
Harrison Feeney	G	1	0	0	0	0
Peter Thome	G	2	0	0	0	0
Bench	-	-	-	-	-	10
Total			39	64	103	112

== Goaltending statistics ==
Name	Games	Minutes	Wins	Losses	Ties	Goals against	Saves	Shut outs	SV %	GAA
Adam Scheel	18	1024	13	3	1	32	397	4	.925	1.88
Peter Thome	6	172	2	1	0	8	58	0	.879	2.79
Harrison Feeney	2	4	0	0	0	0	3	0	1.000	0.00
Empty Net	-	0	-	-	-	0	-	-	-	-
Total	20	1200	15	4	1	40	458	4	.920	2.00

== Rankings ==
Poll	Week																					
Poll	Pre	1	2	3	4	5	6	7	8	9	10	11	12	13	14	15	16	17	18	19	20	21 (Final)
USCHO.com	1	1	1	1	1	4	3	3	3	2	3	2	3	2	2	2	1	2	2	1	-	5
USA Today	1	1	1	1	1	4	3	3	3	2	3	3	3	1	1	1	1	2	2	1	4	5

USCHO did not release a poll in week 20.

== Awards and honors ==
Player	Award	Ref
Jordan Kawaguchi	Lowes' Senior CLASS Award	
Shane Pinto	AHCA West First Team All-American	
Matt Kiersted	AHCA West Second Team All-American	
Jordan Kawaguchi	AHCA West Second Team All-American	
Shane Pinto	NCHC Player of the Year	
Adam Scheel	NCHC Goaltender of the Year	
Shane Pinto	NCHC Forward of the Year	
Jacob Bernard-Docker	NCHC Defensive Defenseman of the Year	
Shane Pinto	NCHC Defensive Forward of the Year	
Brad Berry	Herb Brooks Coach of the Year	
Riese Gaber	Frozen Faceoff MVP	
Adam Scheel	NCHC First Team	
Matt Kiersted	NCHC First Team	
Shane Pinto	NCHC First Team	
Jordan Kawaguchi	NCHC First Team	
Jacob Bernard-Docker	NCHC Second Team	
Collin Adams	NCHC Third Team	
Jake Sanderson	NCHC Rookie Team	
Riese Gaber	NCHC Rookie Team	
Collin Adams	Frozen Faceoff All-Tournament Team	
Gavin Hain	Frozen Faceoff All-Tournament Team	
Riese Gaber	Frozen Faceoff All-Tournament Team	
Jake Sanderson	Frozen Faceoff All-Tournament Team	
Adam Scheel	Frozen Faceoff All-Tournament Team	

== Players drafted into the NHL ==
=== 2021 NHL entry draft ===
Round	Pick	Player	NHL team
3	80	Brent Johnson^{†}	Washington Capitals
4	109	Jackson Blake^{†}	Carolina Hurricanes
6	182	Nate Benoit^{†}	Minnesota Wild

† incoming freshman
