= 2020–21 Denver Pioneers men's ice hockey season =

Collegiate team season

- Conference: 5th NCHC
- Home ice: Magness Arena

Rankings
- USCHO: NR
- USA Today: NR

Record
- Overall: 10–13–1
- Conference: 9–12–1–0–2–1
- Home: 4–2–0
- Road: 2–5–0
- Neutral: 4–6–1

Coaches and captains
- Head coach: David Carle
- Assistant coaches: Tavis MacMillan; Dallas Ferguson; Corey Wogtech
- Captain: Kohen Olischefski
- Alternate captain(s): Ryan Barrow; Griffin Mendel

The 2020–21 Denver Pioneers men's ice hockey season was the 72nd season of play for the program and the 8th in the NCHC conference. The Pioneers represented the University of Denver and were coached by David Carle, in his 3rd season.

== Season ==
As a result of the ongoing COVID-19 pandemic the entire college ice hockey season was delayed. Because the NCAA had previously announced that all winter sports athletes would retain whatever eligibility they possessed through at least the following year, none of Denver's players would lose a season of play. However, the NCAA also approved a change in its transfer regulations that would allow players to transfer and play immediately rather than having to sit out a season, as the rules previously required.

Denver came into the season with high expectations. From the start, however, nothing seemed to go right for the Pioneers. After the season's start was delayed, Denver joined the rest of the NCHC in Omaha, Nebraska for a condensed slate of games in December. The team started slow but looked like they were rounding into form in mid-December. Unfortunately, a theme for the entire season proved to be inconsistency. For most of the year the Pioneers couldn't string together a series of wins, or even strong performances, and they watched as their ranking fell every week until they left the top-20 altogether. By the end of the season Denver sat in the middle of the standings but was 3 games below .500.

While there were some who still included the Pioneers as possible bubble teams, their losing record was a sizable impediment to the team playing in the NCAA Tournament. Denver's only probably road to the tournament was to win the NCHC Championship and the team responded well in the quarterfinals, overcoming a 2-goal deficit to upset tournament-bound Omaha. In the semis they faced #2 North Dakota and took a lead into the third period. The Hawks outplayed Denver in the frame but, as time went along, it appeared that Magnus Chrona might be able to shut out UND. It took North Dakota pulling their goaltender to give them enough firepower to break through and tie the game. In the overtime session, Denver never found their footing and were outshot 9–1 in less than nine minutes. The final goal came from a UND stick and ended the game as well as any chance Denver had to extend their season. This was Denver's first losing season in 21 years.

== Departures ==
Player	Position	Nationality	Cause
Devin Cooley	Goaltender	United States	Signed professional contract (Nashville Predators)
Mike Corson	Goaltender	United States	Transferred to Niagara
Michael Davies	Defenseman	United States	Graduation
Erich Fear	Defenseman	United States	Graduation
Jay Feiwell	Forward	United States	Left program
Liam Finlay	Forward	Canada	Graduation (Signed with KOOVEE)
Tyson McLellan	Forward	United States	Graduation (Signed with Nürnberg Ice Tigers)
Ian Mitchell	Defenseman	Canada	Signed professional contract (Chicago Blackhawks)
Mathias Emilio Pettersen	Forward	Norway	Signed professional contract (Calgary Flames)
Jared Resseguie	Forward	United States	Left program
Tyler Ward	Forward	Canada	Transferred to New Hampshire

== Recruiting ==
Player	Position	Nationality	Age	Notes
Michael Benning	Defenseman	Canada	18	St. Albert, AB; selected 95th overall in 2020
Connor Caponi	Forward	United States	20	Brookfield, WI
Jack Caruso	Goaltender	United States	21	St. Louis, MO
Bo Hanson	Defenseman	United States	22	Boise, ID; transfer from St. Lawrence
Reid Irwin	Forward/Defenseman	Canada	21	Victoria, BC
Steven Jandric	Forward	Canada	23	Prince George, BC; transfer from Alaska
Corbin Kaczperski	Goaltender	United States	24	China Township, MI; graduate transfer from Yale
Carter King	Forward	Canada	19	Calgary, AB
Carter Savoie	Forward	Canada	18	St. Albert, AB; selected 100th overall in 2020
Antti Tuomisto	Defenseman	Finland	19	Pori, FIN; selected 35th overall in 2019
McKade Webster	Forward	United States	20	St. Louis, MO; selected 213th overall in 2019
Jack Works	Forward	Canada	19	Yellowknife, NT

== Roster ==
As of March 1, 2021.

No.	Nat.	Player	Class	Pos	Height	Weight	DoB	Hometown	Previous team	NHL rights
3	(Finland)	Antti Tuomisto	Freshman	D	6' 5" (1.96 m)	205 lb (93 kg)	2001-01-20	Pori, Finland	Ässät U20 (Nuorten SM-liiga)	DET, 35th overall 2019
4	(Canada)	Griffin Mendel (A)	Senior	D	6' 4" (1.93 m)	220 lb (100 kg)	1999-02-18	Kelowna, British Columbia	Penticton Vees (BCHL)	—
6	(United States)	McKade Webster	Freshman	F	5' 10" (1.78 m)	170 lb (77 kg)	2000-07-28	St. Louis, Missouri	Green Bay Gamblers (USHL)	TBL, 213 overall 2019
7	(Canada)	Brett Stapley	Junior	F	5' 10" (1.78 m)	177 lb (80 kg)	1999-02-23	Campbell River, British Columbia	Vernon Vipers (BCHL)	MTL, 190th overall 2018
8	(Canada)	Carter Savoie	Freshman	F	5' 9" (1.75 m)	190 lb (86 kg)	2002-01-23	St. Albert, Alberta	Sherwood Park Crusaders (AJHL)	EDM, 100th overall 2020
10	(Finland)	Jaakko Heikkinen	Senior	F	6' 2" (1.88 m)	185 lb (84 kg)	1997-03-17	Helsinki, Finland	Jokerit U20 (Nuorten SM-liiga)	—
11	(Canada)	Steven Jandric	Senior	F	5' 10" (1.78 m)	203 lb (92 kg)	1997-08-18	Prince George, British Columbia	Alaska (WCHA)	—
12	(Canada)	Kohen Olischefski (C)	Senior	F	6' 1" (1.85 m)	187 lb (85 kg)	1998-02-01	Abbotsford, British Columbia	Chilliwack Chiefs (BCHL)	—
14	(United States)	Bo Hanson	Senior	D	6' 1" (1.85 m)	203 lb (92 kg)	1997-11-13	Boise, Idaho	St. Lawrence (ECAC)	—
15	(Canada)	Carter King	Freshman	F	5' 10" (1.78 m)	178 lb (81 kg)	2001-08-30	Calgary, Alberta	Surrey Eagles (BCHL)	—
16	(United States)	Jake Durflinger	Senior	F	5' 8" (1.73 m)	170 lb (77 kg)	1997-10-06	Walnut Creek, California	Bloomington Thunder (USHL)	—
17	(United States)	Slava Demin	Junior	D	6' 3" (1.91 m)	191 lb (87 kg)	2000-04-04	Cypress, California	Wenatchee Wild (BCHL)	CHI, 99th overall 2018
18	(Canada)	Ryan Barrow (A)	Senior	F	6' 2" (1.88 m)	184 lb (83 kg)	1997-02-15	Banff, Alberta	Langley Rivermen (BCHL)	—
19	(United States)	Cole Guttman	Junior	F	5' 9" (1.75 m)	169 lb (77 kg)	1999-04-06	Los Angeles, California	Dubuque Fighting Saints (USHL)	TBL, 180th overall 2017
20	(Canada)	Michael Benning	Freshman	D	5' 8" (1.73 m)	178 lb (81 kg)	2002-01-05	St. Albert, Alberta	Sherwood Park Crusaders (AJHL)	FLA, 95th overall 2020
21	(Canada)	Reid Irwin	Freshman	D	6' 1" (1.85 m)	178 lb (81 kg)	1999-03-01	Victoria, British Columbia	Sherwood Park Crusaders (AJHL)	—
22	(United States)	Connor Caponi	Freshman	F	5' 9" (1.75 m)	186 lb (84 kg)	2000-03-20	Nashville, Tennessee	Waterloo Black Hawks (USHL)	—
23	(United States)	Lane Krenzen	Sophomore	D	5' 9" (1.75 m)	183 lb (83 kg)	1998-02-21	Twig, Minnesota	Austin Bruins (NAHL)	—
24	(United States)	Bobby Brink	Sophomore	F	5' 9" (1.75 m)	164 lb (74 kg)	2001-07-08	Minnetonka, Minnesota	Sioux City Musketeers (USHL)	PHI, 34th overall 2019
25	(Canada)	Jack Works	Freshman	F	6' 0" (1.83 m)	185 lb (84 kg)	2001-05-23	Yellowknife, Northwest Territories	Okotoks Oilers (AJHL)	—
26	(United States)	Jack Doremus	Senior	F	6' 1" (1.85 m)	178 lb (81 kg)	1997-04-15	Aspen, Colorado	Lincoln Stars (USHL)	—
27	(United States)	Kyle Mayhew	Junior	D	5' 7" (1.7 m)	156 lb (71 kg)	1997-12-25	Anaheim Hills, California	Fairbanks Ice Dogs (NAHL)	—
28	(Canada)	Brett Edwards	Sophomore	F	5' 11" (1.8 m)	190 lb (86 kg)	1998-09-10	Grande Prairie, Alberta	Drumheller Dragons (AJHL)	—
30	(Sweden)	Magnus Chrona	Sophomore	G	6' 5" (1.96 m)	207 lb (94 kg)	2000-08-28	Skellefteå, Sweden	Skellefteå J20 (J20 SuperElit)	SJS, 152nd overall 2018
31	(United States)	Jack Caruso	Freshman	G	5' 9" (1.75 m)	180 lb (82 kg)	1999-06-07	St. Louis, Missouri	Fairbanks Ice Dogs (NAHL)	—
32	(Canada)	Justin Lee	Sophomore	D	6' 0" (1.83 m)	185 lb (84 kg)	2000-03-14	Waskada, Manitoba	Fargo Force (USHL)	—
33	(United States)	Corbin Kaczperski	Senior	G	6' 3" (1.91 m)	195 lb (88 kg)	1996-03-02	China Township, Michigan	Yale (ECAC)	—
37	(United States)	Hank Crone	Junior	F	5' 9" (1.75 m)	151 lb (68 kg)	1998-02-19	Dallas, Texas	Fargo Force (USHL)	—

== Standings ==
2020–21 National Collegiate Hockey Conference Standings
	Conference record											Overall record					
	GP	W	L	T	OTW	OTL	3/SW	PTS	PT%	GF	GA	GP	W	L	T	GF	GA
#5 North Dakota †*	24	18	5	1	2	1	0	54	.750	94	47	29	22	6	1	114	57
#2 St. Cloud State	24	15	9	0	3	3	0	45	.625	78	64	31	20	11	0	101	84
#3 Minnesota Duluth	24	13	9	2	1	2	1	43	.597	72	54	28	15	11	2	84	66
#13 Omaha	24	14	9	1	4	0	1	40	.556	79	69	26	14	11	1	85	81
Denver	22	9	12	1	0	2	1	31	.470	61	60	24	11	13	1	67	66
Western Michigan	24	10	11	3	1	0	1	33	.458	73	84	25	10	12	3	77	89
Colorado College	22	4	16	2	0	2	2	18	.273	35	77	23	4	17	2	36	79
Miami	24	5	17	2	0	1	0	18	.250	46	83	25	5	18	2	48	89
Championship: March 16, 2021 † indicates conference regular season champion (Penrose Cup) * indicates conference tournament champion (Frozen Faceoff Championship Trophy); Rankings: USCHO.com Top 20 Poll

== Schedule and results ==
Date	Time	Opponent^{#}	Rank^{#}	Site	TV	Decision	Result	Attendance	Record
Regular season
December 2	6:35 PM	vs. #3 Minnesota Duluth	#4	Baxter Arena • Omaha, Nebraska	Altitude	Chrona	L 1–2	0	0–1–0 (0–1–0)
December 4	6:35 PM	vs. #1 North Dakota	#4	Baxter Arena • Omaha, Nebraska	Altitude	Chrona	L 3–4 ^{OT}	0	0–2–0 (0–2–0)
December 5	7:05 PM	vs. St. Cloud State	#4	Baxter Arena • Omaha, Nebraska	Altitude	Chrona	L 3–4	0	0–3–0 (0–3–0)
December 8	2:35 PM	vs. #1 North Dakota	#9	Baxter Arena • Omaha, Nebraska	Altitude	Chrona	W 3–2	0	1–3–0 (1–3–0)
December 10	2:35 PM	vs. Miami	#9	Baxter Arena • Omaha, Nebraska	Altitude	Chrona	W 5–1	0	2–3–0 (2–3–0)
December 12	11:05 AM	vs. #3 Minnesota Duluth	#9	Baxter Arena • Omaha, Nebraska	Altitude	Chrona	L 1–4	0	2–4–0 (2–4–0)
December 15	2:35 PM	vs. Western Michigan	#8	Baxter Arena • Omaha, Nebraska	Altitude	Kaczperski	W 3–2	0	3–4–0 (3–4–0)
December 17	6:35 PM	vs. Miami	#8	Baxter Arena • Omaha, Nebraska	Altitude	Kaczperski	L 0–3	0	3–5–0 (3–5–0)
December 19	3:05 PM	vs. Western Michigan	#8	Baxter Arena • Omaha, Nebraska	Altitude	Kaczperski	T 3–3 ^{SOW}	0	3–5–1 (3–5–1)
December 20	3:05 PM	vs. #9 St. Cloud State	#8	Baxter Arena • Omaha, Nebraska	Altitude	Chrona	L 1–3	0	3–6–1 (3–6–1)
January 1	7:06 PM	at Colorado College	#16	Broadmoor World Arena • Colorado Springs, Colorado	CBSSN	Chrona	L 3–4	0	3–7–1 (3–7–1)
January 2	7:07 PM	vs. Colorado College	#16	Magness Arena • Denver, Colorado		Kaczperski	W 6–1	0	4–7–1 (4–7–1)
January 17	7:05 PM	vs. #2 North Dakota	#18	Magness Arena • Denver, Colorado		Chrona	W 4–1	0	5–7–1 (5–7–1)
January 18	7:05 PM	vs. #3 North Dakota	#19	Magness Arena • Denver, Colorado	CBSSN	Chrona	L 1–5	0	5–8–1 (5–8–1)
January 23	5:07 PM	at #11 Omaha	#19	Baxter Arena • Omaha, Nebraska		Kaczperski	W 4–1	1,322	6–8–1 (6–8–1)
January 24	5:00 PM	at #11 Omaha	#19	Baxter Arena • Omaha, Nebraska		Kaczperski	L 2–5	611	6–9–1 (6–9–1)
February 5	7:07 PM	vs. #9 Omaha		Magness Arena • Denver, Colorado		Chrona	W 3–1	0	7–9–1 (7–9–1)
February 6	6:07 PM	vs. #9 Omaha		Magness Arena • Denver, Colorado	CBSSN	Kaczperski	L 4–5 ^{OT}	0	7–10–1 (7–10–1)
February 12	6:37 PM	at #2 North Dakota		Ralph Engelstad Arena • Grand Forks, North Dakota		Chrona	L 0–3	2,286	7–11–1 (7–11–1)
February 13	5:07 PM	at #2 North Dakota		Ralph Engelstad Arena • Grand Forks, North Dakota		Chrona	L 2–5	2,466	7–12–1 (7–12–1)
February 25	7:07 PM	at Colorado College		Broadmoor World Arena • Colorado Springs, Colorado		Chrona	W 5–1	0	8–12–1 (8–12–1)
February 27	7:05 PM	vs. Colorado College		Magness Arena • Denver, Colorado		Chrona	W 4–0	0	9–12–1 (9–12–1)
NCHC Tournament
March 13	1:30 PM	vs. #11 Omaha		Ralph Engelstad Arena • Grand Forks, North Dakota (NCHC Quarterfinals)		Chrona	W 5–4	1,864	10–12–1
March 15	7:00 PM	at #2 North Dakota		Ralph Engelstad Arena • Grand Forks, North Dakota (NCHC Semifinals)		Chrona	L 1–2 ^{OT}	2,509	10–13–1
*Non-conference game. ^{#}Rankings from USCHO.com Poll. All times are in Mountain Time.

== Scoring statistics ==
Name	Position	Games	Goals	Assists	Points	PIM
Cole Guttman	C	23	8	14	22	12
Carter Savoie	LW	24	13	7	20	23
Kohen Olischefski	RW	23	4	10	14	21
Michael Benning	D	21	3	8	11	8
Bobby Brink	RW	15	2	9	11	4
Antti Tuomisto	D	24	2	9	11	23
Hank Crone	LW	13	5	4	9	4
Ryan Barrow	F	24	4	5	9	10
McKade Webster	LW	22	3	6	9	16
Slava Demin	D	21	3	5	8	22
Jaakko Heikkinen	F	24	1	7	8	6
Brett Stapley	C	13	4	3	7	2
Justin Lee	D	24	4	2	6	6
Steven Jandric	LW	20	1	5	6	6
Brett Edwards	F	20	2	2	4	12
Jake Durflinger	RW	22	2	2	4	14
Connor Caponi	F	24	2	2	4	25
Bo Hanson	D	12	1	3	4	4
Kyle Mayhew	D	20	0	4	4	17
Reid Irwin	C/D	12	3	0	3	6
Jack Doremus	F	14	0	2	2	6
Magnus Chrona	G	18	0	2	2	0
Griffin Mendel	D	24	0	2	2	12
Lane Krenzen	D	3	0	1	1	4
Carter King	F	3	0	1	1	0
Jack Works	F	5	0	1	1	2
Corbin Kaczperski	G	9	0	1	1	0
Jack Caruso	G	1	0	0	0	0
Bench	-	-	-	-	-	8
Total			67	117	184	273

== Goaltending statistics ==
Name	Games	Minutes	Wins	Losses	Ties	Goals against	Saves	Shut outs	SV %	GAA
Jack Caruso	1	3:05	0	0	0	0	1	0	1.000	0.00
Magnus Chrona	18	1043	7	11	0	43	421	1	.907	2.47
Corbin Kaczperski	9	392	3	2	1	17	112	0	.868	2.60
Empty Net	-	17	-	-	-	6	-	-	-	-
Total	24	1456	10	13	1	66	534	1	.890	2.72

== Rankings ==
Poll	Week																					
Poll	Pre	1	2	3	4	5	6	7	8	9	10	11	12	13	14	15	16	17	18	19	20	21 (Final)
USCHO.com	5	4	5	4	9	8	14	16	17	18	19	20	NR	NR	NR	NR	NR	NR	NR	NR	-	NR
USA Today	4	5	6	4	8	7	12	14	NR	NR	15	NR	NR	NR	NR	NR	NR	NR	NR	NR	NR	NR

USCHO did not release a poll in week 20.

== Awards and honors ==
Player	Award	Ref
Carter Savoie	NCHC Rookie Team	

== Players drafted into the NHL ==
=== 2021 NHL entry draft ===
Round	Pick	Player	NHL team
2	36	Shai Buium^{†}	Detroit Red Wings
2	61	Sean Behrens^{†}	Colorado Avalanche
3	70	Carter Mazur^{†}	Detroit Red Wings

† incoming freshman
