= 2020–21 Colorado College Tigers men's ice hockey season =

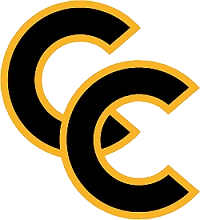
- Conference: 7th NCHC
- Home ice: Broadmoor World Arena

Rankings
- USCHO: NR
- USA Today: NR

Record
- Overall: 4–17–2
- Conference: 4–16–2–0–2–2
- Home: 1–5–0
- Road: 1–7–0
- Neutral: 2–5–2

Coaches and captains
- Head coach: Mike Haviland
- Assistant coaches: R. J. Enga; Leon Hayward; Brent Seidel
- Captain(s): Zach Berzolla; Grant Cruikshank

The 2020–21 Colorado College Tigers men's ice hockey season was the 81st season of play for the program and the 8th in the NCHC conference. The Tigers represented Colorado College and were coached by Mike Haviland, in his 7th season.

== Season ==
As a result of the ongoing COVID-19 pandemic the entire college ice hockey season was delayed. Because the NCAA had previously announced that all winter sports athletes would retain whatever eligibility they possessed through at least the following year, none of Colorado College's players would lose a season of play. However, the NCAA also approved a change in its transfer regulations that would allow players to transfer and play immediately rather than having to sit out a season, as the rules previously required.

Colorado College began the season playing a series of games in Omaha, Nebraska. The team started poorly but improved when freshman goaltender Dominic Basse was moved into the starting role. After the initial glut of games in December, CC's record stood at 2–4–2 with the team looking like it could improve with their bevy of new players. After splitting a weekend with then-ranked Denver at the start of January, the offense fell apart. Over the final two months of the shortened season, the Tigers never scored more than 2 goals in a game and they won once in 14 games. The team still managed to finish above last place in the conference and almost levered their position into a shocking upset of St. Cloud State in the conference quarterfinals but the team's paltry offense could not keep them in the game and they weren't able to hold onto their lead.

After the season, head coach Mike Haviland resigned from his position. The move wasn't surprising considering both the overall lack of success under his tenure and the virtually non-existent offense of this season.

Jake Begley, Jackson Ross and Casey Staum sat out the season

== Departures ==
Player	Position	Nationality	Cause
Alex Berardinelli	Forward	United States	Graduation (Signed with Wichita Thunder)
Kristian Blumenschein	Defenseman	Canada	Graduation
Bailey Conger	Forward	United States	Left program
Jon Flakne	Goaltender	United States	Left program
Andrew Gaus	Forward	United States	Graduation
Nick Halloran	Forward	United States	Graduation (Signed with Ontario Reign)
Erik Middendorf	Forward	United States	Returned to juniors (Chicago Steel)
Alex Pernitsky	Defenseman	Canada	Graduate transfer to MacEwan
Sam Renlund	Forward	United States	Returned to juniors (Des Moines Buccaneers)
Ryan Ruck	Goaltender	United States	Graduation (Signed with Macon Mayhem)
Brady Smith	Defenseman	United States	Returned to juniors (Lone Star Brahmas)
Chris Versich	Forward	United States	Left program
Chris Wilkie	Forward	United States	Graduation (Signed with Rockford IceHogs)

== Recruiting ==
Player	Position	Nationality	Age	Notes
Nicklas Andrews	Defenseman	United States	19	Canton, MI
Dominic Basse	Goaltender	United States	19	Alexandria, VA; selected 167th overall in 2019
Jake Begley	Goaltender	United States	21	Mahtomedi, MN
Jordan Biro	Forward	Canada	20	Sherwood Park, AB
Hugo Blixt	Defenseman	Sweden	22	Västerås, SWE; transfer from Boston University
Ray Christy	Forward	United States	21	Saint Paul, MN
Tyler Coffey	Forward	United States	20	Hamilton, NJ
Chase Foley	Defenseman	United States	21	West St. Paul, MN
Matthew Gleason	Forward	United States	19	Saint Paul, MN
Brian Hawkinson	Forward	United States	22	Kailua, HI; transfer from Miami
Jackson Jutting	Forward	United States	19	Savage, MN
Hunter McKown	Forward	United States	18	San Jose, CA
Jack Millar	Defenseman	United States	19	Westminster, CO
Marc Pasemko	Forward	United States	21	Edmonton, AB
Logan Will	Forward	United States	20	Ames, IA

== Roster ==
As of March 1, 2021.

No.	Nat.	Player	Class	Pos	Height	Weight	DoB	Hometown	Previous team	NHL rights
1	(United States)	Jake Begley	Freshman	G	6' 1" (1.85 m)	166 lb (75 kg)	1999-03-18	Mahtomedi, Minnesota	Brockville Braves (CCHL)	—
2	(United States)	Chad Sasaki	Sophomore	D	5' 7" (1.7 m)	150 lb (68 kg)	1998-02-06	Cypress, California	Wenatchee Wild (BCHL)	—
4	(United States)	Bryan Yoon	Junior	D	6' 1" (1.85 m)	171 lb (78 kg)	1998-01-27	Parker, Colorado	Tri-City Storm (USHL)	—
5	(United States)	Jack Millar	Freshman	D	6' 5" (1.96 m)	211 lb (96 kg)	2000-11-30	Westminster, Colorado	Cedar Rapids RoughRiders (USHL)	—
7	(United States)	Chase Foley	Freshman	D	5' 10" (1.78 m)	168 lb (76 kg)	2000-02-17	Mendota Heights, Minnesota	Sioux Falls Stampede (USHL)	—
8	(United States)	Zach Berzolla (C)	Senior	D	6' 2" (1.88 m)	202 lb (92 kg)	1998-05-28	Howell, New Jersey	Muskegon Lumberjacks (USHL)	—
9	(United States)	Jackson Ross	Junior	D	6' 0" (1.83 m)	184 lb (83 kg)	1997-03-28	Denver, Colorado	Surrey Eagles (BCHL)	—
10	(United States)	Patrick Cozzi	Sophomore	F	5' 9" (1.75 m)	167 lb (76 kg)	1998-04-30	Greenlawn, New York	Prince George Spruce Kings (BCHL)	—
11	(United States)	Ray Christy	Freshman	F	5' 10" (1.78 m)	165 lb (75 kg)	1999-09-15	St. Paul, Minnesota	Sioux City Musketeers (USHL)	—
12	(United States)	Ben Copeland	Junior	F	6' 1" (1.85 m)	176 lb (80 kg)	1999-04-27	Edina, Minnesota	Waterloo Black Hawks (USHL)	—
13	(Canada)	Jordan Biro	Freshman	F	5' 8" (1.73 m)	160 lb (73 kg)	2000-08-10	Sherwood Park, Alberta	Spruce Grove Saints (AJHL)	—
15	(United States)	Matthew Gleason	Freshman	F	5' 8" (1.73 m)	175 lb (79 kg)	2001-09-20	St. Paul, Minnesota	Chicago Steel (USHL)	—
16	(United States)	Jackson Jutting	Freshman	F	5' 10" (1.78 m)	196 lb (89 kg)	2001-02-27	Savage, Minnesota	Cedar Rapids RoughRiders (USHL)	—
17	(United States)	Tyler Coffey	Freshman	F	5' 10" (1.78 m)	179 lb (81 kg)	2000-05-19	Hamilton, New Jersey	Sioux Falls Stampede (USHL)	—
18	(United States)	Connor Mayer	Sophomore	D	5' 11" (1.8 m)	177 lb (80 kg)	1999-06-13	Champlin, Minnesota	Central Illinois Flying Aces (USHL)	—
19	(United States)	Troy Conzo	Senior	F	5' 11" (1.8 m)	157 lb (71 kg)	1997-02-21	Nesconset, New York	Wenatchee Wild (BCHL)	—
20	(United States)	Logan Will	Freshman	F	5' 11" (1.8 m)	186 lb (84 kg)	2000-06-14	Ames, Iowa	Omaha Lancers (USHL)	—
21	(United States)	Grant Cruikshank (C)	Junior	F	5' 11" (1.8 m)	186 lb (84 kg)	1998-07-19	Delafield, Wisconsin	Penticton Vees (BCHL)	—
22	(United States)	Dominic Basse	Freshman	G	6' 6" (1.98 m)	184 lb (83 kg)	2001-04-22	Alexandria, Virginia	Youngstown Phantoms (USHL)	CHI, 167th overall 2019
23	(Sweden)	Hugo Blixt	Junior	F	6' 4" (1.93 m)	199 lb (90 kg)	1998-01-02	Linköping, Sweden	Boston University (HEA)	—
24	(United States)	Jack Gates	Senior	F	5' 7" (1.7 m)	151 lb (68 kg)	1998-02-24	Oceanside, California	Janesville Jets (NAHL)	—
25	(United States)	Brian Williams	Senior	F	5' 10" (1.78 m)	160 lb (73 kg)	1995-01-08	San Diego, California	Wenatchee Wild (BCHL)	—
27	(United States)	Josiah Slavin	Sophomore	F	6' 3" (1.91 m)	187 lb (85 kg)	1998-12-31	Erie, Colorado	Chicago Steel (USHL)	CHI, 193rd overall 2018
28	(United States)	Nicklas Andrews	Freshman	D	5' 10" (1.78 m)	192 lb (87 kg)	2001-07-06	Canton, Michigan	Des Moines Buccaneers (USHL)	—
29	(United States)	Brian Hawkinson	Junior	F	5' 10" (1.78 m)	170 lb (77 kg)	1998-01-10	Centennial, Colorado	Miami (NCHC)	—
30	(Canada)	Matt Vernon	Sophomore	G	5' 11" (1.8 m)	166 lb (75 kg)	1998-03-29	Calgary, Alberta	Aberdeen Wings (NAHL)	—
34	(Canada)	Marc Pasemko	Freshman	F	5' 9" (1.75 m)	170 lb (77 kg)	1999-04-06	Edmonton, Alberta	Okotoks Oilers (AJHL)	—
36	(United States)	McKay Flanagan	Senior	D	6' 1" (1.85 m)	197 lb (89 kg)	1997-02-03	Ridgefield, Connecticut	Langley Rivermen (BCHL)	—
37	(United States)	Casey Staum	Sophomore	D	6' 0" (1.83 m)	180 lb (82 kg)	1998-01-08	St. Paul, Minnesota	Chicago Steel (USHL)	MTL, 124th overall 2016
41	(United States)	Hunter McKown	Freshman	F	6' 1" (1.85 m)	195 lb (88 kg)	2002-08-18	San Jose, California	USNTDP (USHL)	—

== Standings ==
2020–21 National Collegiate Hockey Conference Standings
	Conference record											Overall record					
	GP	W	L	T	OTW	OTL	3/SW	PTS	PT%	GF	GA	GP	W	L	T	GF	GA
#5 North Dakota †*	24	18	5	1	2	1	0	54	.750	94	47	29	22	6	1	114	57
#2 St. Cloud State	24	15	9	0	3	3	0	45	.625	78	64	31	20	11	0	101	84
#3 Minnesota Duluth	24	13	9	2	1	2	1	43	.597	72	54	28	15	11	2	84	66
#13 Omaha	24	14	9	1	4	0	1	40	.556	79	69	26	14	11	1	85	81
Denver	22	9	12	1	0	2	1	31	.470	61	60	24	11	13	1	67	66
Western Michigan	24	10	11	3	1	0	1	33	.458	73	84	25	10	12	3	77	89
Colorado College	22	4	16	2	0	2	2	18	.273	35	77	23	4	17	2	36	79
Miami	24	5	17	2	0	1	0	18	.250	46	83	25	5	18	2	48	89
Championship: March 16, 2021 † indicates conference regular season champion (Penrose Cup) * indicates conference tournament champion (Frozen Faceoff Championship Trophy); Rankings: USCHO.com Top 20 Poll

== Schedule and results ==
Date	Time	Opponent^{#}	Rank^{#}	Site	TV	Decision	Result	Attendance	Record
Regular season
December 8	10:35 AM	vs. Western Michigan		Baxter Arena • Omaha, Nebraska		Vernon	T 3–3 ^{SOW}	0	0–0–1 (0–0–1)
December 9	6:35 PM	vs. #18 Omaha		Baxter Arena • Omaha, Nebraska	AT&T RM	Vernon	L 1–6	0	0–1–1 (0–1–1)
December 11	6:35 PM	vs. Western Michigan		Baxter Arena • Omaha, Nebraska	AT&T RM	Vernon	L 2–5	0	0–2–1 (0–2–1)
December 13	11:05 AM	vs. #3 Minnesota Duluth		Baxter Arena • Omaha, Nebraska	AT&T RM	Basse	W 4–1	0	1–2–1 (1–2–1)
December 15	6:35 PM	vs. Miami		Baxter Arena • Omaha, Nebraska	AT&T RM	Basse	W 4–1	0	2–2–1 (2–2–1)
December 18	6:35 PM	vs. #9 St. Cloud State		Baxter Arena • Omaha, Nebraska	AT&T RM	Basse	L 3–4 ^{OT}	0	2–3–1 (2–3–1)
December 19	7:05 PM	vs. Miami		Baxter Arena • Omaha, Nebraska	AT&T RM	Basse	T 1–1 ^{SOW}	0	2–3–2 (2–3–2)
December 21	11:05 AM	vs. #11 Omaha		Baxter Arena • Omaha, Nebraska		Basse	L 0–3	0	2–4–2 (2–4–2)
January 1	7:06 PM	vs. #16 Denver		Broadmoor World Arena • Colorado Springs, Colorado	CBSSN	Basse	W 4–3	0	3–4–2 (3–4–2)
January 2	7:07 PM	at #16 Denver		Magness Arena • Denver, Colorado		Basse	L 1–6	0	3–5–2 (3–5–2)
January 10	7:07 PM	vs. #2 North Dakota		Broadmoor World Arena • Colorado Springs, Colorado		Vernon	L 0–3	0	3–6–2 (3–6–2)
January 11	7:07 PM	vs. #2 North Dakota		Broadmoor World Arena • Colorado Springs, Colorado		Basse	L 1–2	0	3–7–2 (3–7–2)
January 18	7:07 PM	vs. #11 Omaha		Broadmoor World Arena • Colorado Springs, Colorado		Basse	L 2–3	0	3–8–2 (3–8–2)
January 19	7:07 PM	vs. #11 Omaha		Broadmoor World Arena • Colorado Springs, Colorado		Vernon	L 2–3 ^{OT}	0	3–9–2 (3–9–2)
January 23	5:07 PM	at #3 North Dakota		Ralph Engelstad Arena • Grand Forks, North Dakota		Basse	L 1–4	2,008	3–10–2 (3–10–2)
January 24	5:07 PM	at #3 North Dakota		Ralph Engelstad Arena • Grand Forks, North Dakota		Basse	L 0–5	1,775	3–11–2 (3–11–2)
February 12	6:07 PM	at #10 Omaha		Baxter Arena • Omaha, Nebraska		Basse	L 1–7	1,248	3–12–2 (3–12–2)
February 13	5:07 PM	at #10 Omaha		Baxter Arena • Omaha, Nebraska		Basse	L 2–3	1,524	3–13–2 (3–13–2)
February 18	5:07 PM	at #8 Minnesota Duluth		AMSOIL Arena • Duluth, Minnesota		Basse	W 2–1	250	4–13–2 (4–13–2)
February 20	11:00 AM	at #6 St. Cloud State		Herb Brooks National Hockey Center • St. Cloud, Minnesota		Basse	L 0–4	143	4–14–2 (4–14–2)
February 25	7:07 PM	vs. Denver		Broadmoor World Arena • Colorado Springs, Colorado		Basse	L 1–5	0	4–15–2 (4–15–2)
February 27	7:07 PM	at Denver		Magness Arena • Denver, Colorado		Vernon	L 0–4	42	4–16–2 (4–16–2)
NCHC Tournament
February 27	7:07 PM	at #8 St. Cloud State		Ralph Engelstad Arena • Grand Forks, North Dakota		Vernon	L 1–2	1,923	4–17–2
*Non-conference game. ^{#}Rankings from USCHO.com Poll. All times are in Mountain Time.

== Scoring Statistics ==
Name	Position	Games	Goals	Assists	Points	PIM
Josiah Slavin	LW	22	5	8	13	4
Ben Copeland	C	22	4	7	11	18
Grant Cruikshank	C	16	8	2	10	4
Jack Millar	D	23	2	4	6	8
Hunter McKown	RW	23	2	4	6	16
Troy Conzo	F	22	2	3	5	6
Patrick Cozzi	RW	22	1	4	5	2
Logan Will	F	23	3	1	4	12
Zach Berzolla	D	23	1	3	4	59
Brian Hawkinson	RW	23	2	1	3	4
Jackson Jutting	F	19	1	2	3	4
Nicklas Andrews	D	22	1	2	3	22
Chase Foley	D	15	0	3	3	2
Bryan Yoon	D	19	1	1	2	2
Connor Mayer	D	22	1	1	2	21
Jordan Biro	C	18	0	2	2	2
Hugo Blixt	D	22	0	2	2	37
McKay Flanagan	D	2	1	0	1	0
Matthew Gleason	C	7	1	0	1	8
Tyler Coffey	F	12	0	1	1	0
Jack Gates	C	23	0	1	1	8
Chad Sasaki	D	2	0	0	0	0
Brian Williams	C	4	0	0	0	0
Matt Vernon	G	10	0	0	0	0
Marc Pasemko	F	10	0	0	0	2
Dominic Basse	G	17	0	0	0	0
Ray Christy	F	18	0	0	0	2
Bench	-	-	-	-	-	6
Total			36	52	88	245

== Goaltending statistics ==
Name	Games	Minutes	Wins	Losses	Ties	Goals against	Saves	Shut outs	SV %	GAA
Dominic Basse	17	942	4	11	1	50	425	0	.895	3.18
Matt Vernon	10	449	0	6	1	28	180	0	.865	3.74
Empty Net	-	5	-	-	-	1	-	-	-	-
Total	23	1396	4	17	2	79	605	0	.885	3.39

== Rankings ==
Poll	Week																					
Poll	Pre	1	2	3	4	5	6	7	8	9	10	11	12	13	14	15	16	17	18	19	20	21 (Final)
USCHO.com	NR	NR	NR	NR	NR	NR	NR	NR	NR	NR	NR	NR	NR	NR	NR	NR	NR	NR	NR	NR	-	NR
USA Today	NR	NR	NR	NR	NR	NR	NR	NR	NR	NR	NR	NR	NR	NR	NR	NR	NR	NR	NR	NR	NR	NR

USCHO did not release a poll in week 20.

== Awards and honors ==
Player	Award	Ref
Grant Cruikshank	NCHC Third Team	
