= 2020–21 Minnesota Duluth Bulldogs men's ice hockey season =

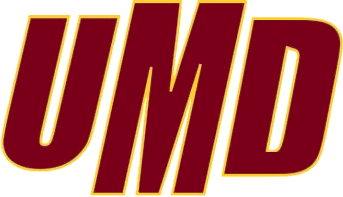

NCAA Tournament, Frozen Four
- Conference: 3rd NCHC
- Home ice: AMSOIL Arena

Rankings
- USCHO: #3
- USA Today: #4

Record
- Overall: 15–11–2
- Conference: 13–9–2–1–2–1
- Home: 5–3–0
- Road: 3–4–0
- Neutral: 7–4–2

Coaches and captains
- Head coach: Scott Sandelin
- Assistant coaches: Derek Plante; Adam Krause; Brant Nicklin
- Captain: Noah Cates
- Alternate captain(s): Cole Koepke; Louie Roehl; Nick Swaney

The 2020–21 Minnesota Duluth Bulldogs men's ice hockey season was the 77th season of play for the program and the 8th in the NCHC conference. The Bulldogs represented the University of Minnesota Duluth and were coached by Scott Sandelin, in his 21st season.

== Season ==
As a result of the ongoing COVID-19 pandemic the entire college ice hockey season was delayed. Because the NCAA had previously announced that all winter sports athletes would retain whatever eligibility they possessed through at least the following year, none of Minnesota Duluth's players would lose a season of play. However, the NCAA also approved a change in its transfer regulations that would allow players to transfer and play immediately rather than having to sit out a season, as the rules previously required.

Along with the rest of the NCHC, Minnesota Duluth began the year in Omaha, Nebraska. Duluth was forced to replace not only the best goaltender in the history of the program, Hunter Shepard, but three standout defensemen, including Hobey Baker Award-winning Scott Perunovich. Despite the talent drain, UMD started the season hot, going undefeated in their first 6 games. The team ran into a bit of trouble in the third week of December but still entered January ranked in the top-5. The Bulldogs began 2021 with 4 consecutive games against St. Cloud State and after winning the first match, dropped three straight to the Huskies. All of the games were close but the bad run allowed freshman Zach Stejskal to get a few turns in the starting role. Duluth recovered with three weeks against bad teams, winning 6 consecutive games, but was stymied by Western Michigan and limped to the end of the regular season. UMD ended up getting passed by St. Cloud in the final game and ended up 3rd in the conference.

The result of their finish was a meeting with Western Michigan in the conference tournament, and Minnesota Duluth had to overcome two separate leads by the Broncos to take the game in overtime. In the semifinal they faced St. Cloud State for the 7th time that season (1/4 of their games) and could never quite impose their will on the Huskies. UMD tied the game twice but the Bulldogs couldn't overcome St. Cloud's 3rd goal and fell in the semifinals. Fortunately, UMD was ranked in the top-10 and was essentially guaranteed a spot in the NCAA Tournament.

Minnesota Duluth was ranked 9th by the selection committee and given a #3 seed. They were placed opposite Michigan but COVID-19 prevented their meeting. Due to Michigan's withdrawal, UMD's first tournament game would be against top-seeded North Dakota and the two ended up producing a game for the ages. UMD started Stejskal in goal and the plan looked to be the perfect choice early; Stejskal turned aside every UND shot in the first two periods and allowed the Bulldogs to take a 2-goal lead early in the third. North Dakota pulled their goalie with more than 2 minutes to play, trying to jump-start their offense and, miraculously, the tactic worked. The Fighting Hawks scored twice in the final 100 seconds and tied the game. The two teams continued to battle into overtime and UMD scored in the extra frame, only to see the goal waved-off due to offsides. More than 40 minutes later, UND almost ended the game when the puck hit Stejskal in the shoulder, deflected up and landed on top of the goal. In the 4th overtime, it looked like North Dakota had caught a break when Stejskal had to leave the game due to cramping but, fortunately for UMD, Ryan Fanti was more than capable of holding the fort. It took another period before the game finally saw the winning goal and freshman Luke Mylymok ended the match with just his second career goal. This was the longest game in the history of the NCAA tournament but was still more than 27 minutes shorter than the longest contest in NCAA history.

The win sent Minnesota Duluth into the Frozen Four for the 4th consecutive season (not counting the cancelled 2020 Tournament) and were joined by two other Minnesota teams. In the national semifinal, UMD faced Massachusetts in a rematch of the 2019 championship. Before the game began, UMD lost the serviced of Fanti due to COVID protocols but UMass would be without 4 players, including their starting goaltender and leading goal-scorer. Despite the disadvantage, the Minutemen hung in the game, keeping the score close while being outshout 36–15 in regulation. UMD was unable to get much past Matt Murray and had to settle for another overtime game with the score knotted at two apiece. In the extra session, Massachusetts came alive and skated rings around the Bulldogs. UMass fired 13 shots on goal, to UMD's 2 and were control most of the overtime. When Garrett Wait netted the winning goal it not only ended the Bulldogs' season but their 9-game winning streak in NCAA overtime games that stretched back to 1985.

Brady Meyer and Ben Patt sat out the season.

== Departures ==
Player	Position	Nationality	Cause
Jarod Hilderman	Defenseman	Canada	Graduation (Signed with Birmingham Bulls)
Jade Miller	Forward	United States	Graduation (Signed with South Carolina Stingrays)
Scott Perunovich	Defenseman	United States	Signed professional contract (St. Louis Blues)
Brandon Puricelli	Forward	United States	Transferred to Lake Superior State
Justin Richards	Forward	United States	Signed professional contract (New York Rangers)
Dylan Samberg	Defenseman	United States	Signed professional contract (Winnipeg Jets)
Hunter Shepard	Goaltender	United States	Graduation (Signed with Hershey Bears)
Nick Wolff	Defenseman	United States	Graduation (Signed with Boston Bruins)

== Recruiting ==
Player	Position	Nationality	Age	Notes
Blake Biondi	Forward	United States	18	Hermantown, MN; selected 109th overall in 2020
Matt Cairns	Defenseman	Canada	21	Mississauga, ON; transfer from Cornell; selected 84th overall in 2016
Darian Gotz	Defenseman	United States	19	Hermantown, MN
Wyatt Kaiser	Defenseman	United States	21	Ham Lake, MN; selected 81st overall in 2020
Connor Kelley	Defenseman	United States	19	Maple Grove, MN
Jarrett Lee	Forward	United States	21	Hibbing, MN; transfer from Northern Michigan
Luke Mylymok	Forward	United States	19	Wilcox, SK
Zach Stejskal	Goaltender	United States	20	Cohasset, MN

== Roster ==
As of March 1, 2021.

No.	Nat.	Player	Class	Pos	Height	Weight	DoB	Hometown	Previous team	NHL rights
2	(United States)	Darian Gotz	Freshman	D	5' 11" (1.8 m)	189 lb (86 kg)	2000-10-19	Hermantown, Minnesota	Cedar Rapids (USHL)	—
3	(United States)	Matt Anderson	Senior	D	6' 0" (1.83 m)	195 lb (88 kg)	1999-04-11	Shakopee, Minnesota	Holy Family (USHS–MN)	—
5	(United States)	Wyatt Kaiser	Freshman	D	6' 0" (1.83 m)	173 lb (78 kg)	2002-07-31	Ham Lake, Minnesota	Andover (USHS–MN)	CHI, 81st overall 2020
6	(United States)	Louie Roehl (A)	Senior	D	5' 10" (1.78 m)	185 lb (84 kg)	1998-04-09	Eden Prairie, Minnesota	Minnesota Wilderness (NAHL)	—
7	(United States)	Blake Biondi	Freshman	F	6' 0" (1.83 m)	181 lb (82 kg)	2002-04-24	Hermantown, Minnesota	Hermantown (USHS–MN)	MTL, 109th overall 2020
8	(United States)	Hunter Lellig	Junior	D	6' 2" (1.88 m)	195 lb (88 kg)	1999-02-08	Waterloo, Iowa	Waterloo (USHL)	—
10	(United States)	Kobe Roth	Senior	F	5' 9" (1.75 m)	175 lb (79 kg)	1997-01-11	Warroad, Minnesota	Des Moines (USHL)	—
11	(United States)	Koby Bender	Senior	F	6' 1" (1.85 m)	200 lb (91 kg)	1997-07-15	Cloquet, Minnesota	Muskegon (USHL)	—
12	(United States)	Ben Almquist	Sophomore	F	6' 0" (1.83 m)	185 lb (84 kg)	1999-10-01	Victoria, Minnesota	Austin (NAHL)	—
13	(Canada)	Tanner Laderoute	Junior	F	6' 0" (1.83 m)	190 lb (86 kg)	1997-06-04	Edmonton, Alberta	Okotoks (AJHL)	—
15	(Canada)	Quinn Olson	Sophomore	F	5' 11" (1.8 m)	170 lb (77 kg)	2001-05-09	Calgary, Alberta	Okotoks (AJHL)	BOS, 92nd overall 2019
16	(United States)	Luke Loheit	Sophomore	F	6' 1" (1.85 m)	195 lb (88 kg)	2000-07-26	Minnetonka, Minnesota	Penticton (BCHL)	OTT, 194th overall 2018
17	(United States)	Cole Koepke (A)	Junior	F	6' 1" (1.85 m)	195 lb (88 kg)	1998-05-17	Hermantown, Minnesota	Sioux City (USHL)	TBL, 183rd overall 2018
18	(United States)	Jesse Jacques	Junior	F	6' 1" (1.85 m)	195 lb (88 kg)	1998-09-10	Hermantown, Minnesota	Green Bay (USHL)	—
19	(United States)	Jarrett Lee	Junior	F	5' 10" (1.78 m)	154 lb (70 kg)	1999-06-04	Hibbing, Minnesota	Green Bay (USHL)	—
20	(United States)	Jackson Cates	Junior	F	6' 0" (1.83 m)	190 lb (86 kg)	1997-09-28	Stillwater, Minnesota	Waterloo (USHL)	—
21	(United States)	Noah Cates (C)	Junior	F	6' 2" (1.88 m)	190 lb (86 kg)	1999-02-05	Stillwater, Minnesota	Omaha (USHL)	PHI, 137th overall 2017
22	(Canada)	Matt Cairns	Senior	D	6' 2" (1.88 m)	203 lb (92 kg)	1998-04-27	Mississauga, Ontario	Cornell (ECAC)	EDM, 84th overall 2016
23	(United States)	Nick Swaney (A)	Senior	F	5' 11" (1.8 m)	175 lb (79 kg)	1997-09-09	Lakeville, Minnesota	Waterloo (USHL)	MIN, 209th overall 2017
24	(United States)	Luke Mylymok	Freshman	F	5' 11" (1.8 m)	183 lb (83 kg)	2001-09-29	Boise, Idaho	Salmon Arm (BCHL)	—
25	(United States)	Connor Kelley	Freshman	D	6' 1" (1.85 m)	190 lb (86 kg)	2002-01-30	Maple Grove, Minnesota	USNTDP (USHL)	—
27	(United States)	Jake Rosenbaum	Junior	D	6' 0" (1.83 m)	190 lb (86 kg)	1997-03-28	Trabuco Canyon, California	Minot (NAHL)	—
28	(United States)	Brady Meyer	Sophomore	F	6' 5" (1.96 m)	215 lb (98 kg)	2000-10-17	North Branch, Minnesota	Green Bay Gamblers (USHL)	—
35	(United States)	Zach Stejskal	Freshman	G	6' 4" (1.93 m)	215 lb (98 kg)	1999-12-20	Cohasset, Minnesota	Wilkes-Barre/Scranton (NAHL)	—
36	(Canada)	Ben Patt	Junior (RS)	G	5' 11" (1.8 m)	180 lb (82 kg)	1996-05-19	Brampton, Ontario	Notre Dame (SJHL)	—
39	(Canada)	Ryan Fanti	Sophomore	G	6' 3" (1.91 m)	195 lb (88 kg)	1999-10-03	Thunder Bay, Ontario	Minnesota Wilderness (NAHL)	—

== Standings ==
2020–21 National Collegiate Hockey Conference Standings
	Conference record											Overall record					
	GP	W	L	T	OTW	OTL	3/SW	PTS	PT%	GF	GA	GP	W	L	T	GF	GA
#5 North Dakota †*	24	18	5	1	2	1	0	54	.750	94	47	29	22	6	1	114	57
#2 St. Cloud State	24	15	9	0	3	3	0	45	.625	78	64	31	20	11	0	101	84
#3 Minnesota Duluth	24	13	9	2	1	2	1	43	.597	72	54	28	15	11	2	84	66
#13 Omaha	24	14	9	1	4	0	1	40	.556	79	69	26	14	11	1	85	81
Denver	22	9	12	1	0	2	1	31	.470	61	60	24	11	13	1	67	66
Western Michigan	24	10	11	3	1	0	1	33	.458	73	84	25	10	12	3	77	89
Colorado College	22	4	16	2	0	2	2	18	.273	35	77	23	4	17	2	36	79
Miami	24	5	17	2	0	1	0	18	.250	46	83	25	5	18	2	48	89
Championship: March 16, 2021 † indicates conference regular season champion (Penrose Cup) * indicates conference tournament champion (Frozen Faceoff Championship Trophy); Rankings: USCHO.com Top 20 Poll

== Schedule and results ==
Date	Time	Opponent^{#}	Rank^{#}	Site	TV	Decision	Result	Attendance	Record
Regular season
December 1	3:35 PM	vs. Omaha	#3	Baxter Arena • Omaha, Nebraska		Fanti	W 5–3	0	1–0–0 (1–0–0)
December 2	7:35 PM	vs. #4 Denver	#3	Baxter Arena • Omaha, Nebraska	Altitude	Fanti	W 2–1	0	2–0–0 (2–0–0)
December 6	4:05 PM	vs. Miami	#3	Baxter Arena • Omaha, Nebraska		Fanti	W 5–3	0	3–0–0 (3–0–0)
December 8	7:35 PM	vs. Miami	#3	Baxter Arena • Omaha, Nebraska		Stejskal	W 4–2	0	4–0–0 (4–0–0)
December 10	7:35 PM	vs. #1 North Dakota	#3	Baxter Arena • Omaha, Nebraska		Fanti	T 2–2 ^{SOW}	0	4–0–1 (4–0–1)
December 12	12:05 PM	vs. #9 Denver	#3	Baxter Arena • Omaha, Nebraska	Altitude	Fanti	W 4–1	0	5–0–1 (5–0–1)
December 13	12:05 PM	vs. Colorado College	#3	Baxter Arena • Omaha, Nebraska	AT&T RM	Fanti	L 1–4	0	5–1–1 (5–1–1)
December 16	3:35 PM	vs. #17 Omaha	#3	Baxter Arena • Omaha, Nebraska		Fanti	T 2–2 ^{SOL}	0	5–1–2 (5–1–2)
December 19	12:05 PM	vs. #4 North Dakota	#3	Baxter Arena • Omaha, Nebraska		Fanti	L 1–2	0	5–2–2 (5–2–2)
January 2	6:00 PM	at #6 St. Cloud State	#4	Herb Brooks National Hockey Center • St. Cloud, Minnesota		Fanti	W 4–3 ^{OT}	101	6–2–2 (6–2–2)
January 3	4:00 PM	at #6 St. Cloud State	#4	Herb Brooks National Hockey Center • St. Cloud, Minnesota		Fanti	L 1–3	102	6–3–2 (6–3–2)
January 8	7:36 PM	vs. #6 St. Cloud State	#5	AMSOIL Arena • Duluth, Minnesota	CBSSN	Fanti	L 3–4	0	6–4–2 (6–4–2)
January 9	6:00 PM	vs. #6 St. Cloud State	#5	AMSOIL Arena • Duluth, Minnesota		Stejskal	L 0–1 ^{OT}	0	6–5–2 (6–5–2)
January 23	6:00 PM	vs. Western Michigan	#7	AMSOIL Arena • Duluth, Minnesota		Fanti	W 5–1	150	7–5–2 (7–5–2)
January 24	4:00 PM	vs. Western Michigan	#7	AMSOIL Arena • Duluth, Minnesota		Stejskal	W 4–1	150	8–5–2 (8–5–2)
January 29	3:00 PM	at Miami	#6	Steve Cady Arena • Oxford, Ohio		Fanti	W 2–1	0	9–5–2 (9–5–2)
January 30	4:00 PM	at Miami	#6	Steve Cady Arena • Oxford, Ohio		Fanti	W 6–3	0	10–5–2 (10–5–2)
February 5	6:00 PM	vs. Miami	#5	AMSOIL Arena • Duluth, Minnesota		Fanti	W 8–1	150	11–5–2 (11–5–2)
February 6	4:00 PM	vs. Miami	#5	AMSOIL Arena • Duluth, Minnesota		Stejskal	W 3–1	150	12–5–2 (12–5–2)
February 12	5:05 PM	at Western Michigan	#4	Lawson Arena • Kalamazoo, Michigan		Fanti	L 0–4	125	12–6–2 (12–6–2)
February 13	3:05 PM	at Western Michigan	#4	Lawson Arena • Kalamazoo, Michigan		Stejskal	L 1–4	125	12–7–2 (12–7–2)
February 18	3:05 PM	vs. Colorado College	#8	AMSOIL Arena • Duluth, Minnesota		Fanti	L 1–2	250	12–8–2 (12–8–2)
February 27	7:07 PM	vs. #6 St. Cloud State	#10	AMSOIL Arena • Duluth, Minnesota	CBSSN	Stejskal	W 5–1	250	13–8–2 (13–8–2)
March 6	7:07 PM	vs. #8 St. Cloud State	#9	Herb Brooks National Hockey Center • St. Cloud, Minnesota		Stejskal	L 3–4 ^{OT}	201	13–9–2 (13–9–2)
NCHC Tournament
March 13	7:30 PM	vs. Western Michigan*	#9	Ralph Engelstad Arena • Grand Forks, North Dakota		Fanti	W 5–4 ^{OT}	2,167	14–9–2
March 15	3:00 PM	vs. #8 St. Cloud State*	#9	Ralph Engelstad Arena • Grand Forks, North Dakota		Fanti	L 2–3	1,957	14–10–2
NCAA Tournament
March 26	3:00 PM	vs. #8 Michigan	#9	Scheels Arena • Fargo, North Dakota (Regional semifinals)	ESPNU	Cancelled due to COVID-19 protocols			
March 27	6:30 PM	vs. #1 North Dakota*	#9	Scheels Arena • Fargo, North Dakota (Regional final)	ESPNU	Fanti	W 3–2 ^{5OT}	1,494	15–10–2
April 8	8:00 PM	vs. #6 Massachusetts*	#9	PPG Paints Arena • Pittsburgh, Pennsylvania (National semifinals)	ESPN2	Stejskal	L 2–3 ^{OT}	3,660	15–11–2
*Non-conference game. ^{#}Rankings from USCHO.com Poll. All times are in Central Time.

== Scoring statistics ==
Name	Position	Games	Goals	Assists	Points	PIM
Nick Swaney	RW	28	13	15	28	10
Jackson Cates	C	28	11	16	27	4
Cole Koepke	LW	28	15	8	23	22
Kobe Roth	F	28	13	10	23	2
Koby Bender	F	28	7	13	20	21
Noah Cates	LW	28	5	14	19	25
Quinn Olson	C/LW	28	3	8	11	16
Tanner Laderoute	F	28	3	7	10	11
Wyatt Kaiser	D	28	0	10	10	26
Jesse Jacques	F	28	2	7	9	18
Matt Anderson	D	28	0	7	7	16
Matt Cairns	D	28	0	6	6	12
Connor Kelley	D	25	3	2	5	4
Luke Loheit	RW	28	3	2	5	35
Blake Biondi	C	26	2	3	5	8
Hunter Lellig	D	28	1	4	5	4
Luke Mylymok	C/W	12	2	2	4	15
Louie Roehl	D	28	0	3	3	34
Jake Rosenbaum	D	8	0	2	2	0
Ben Almquist	F	10	1	0	1	0
Darian Gotz	D	19	0	1	1	4
Zach Stejskal	G	9	0	0	0	0
Jarret Lee	F	12	0	0	0	4
Ryan Fanti	G	20	0	0	0	0
Bench	-	-	-	-	-	4
Total			84	140	224	295

== Goaltending statistics ==
Name	Games	Minutes	Wins	Losses	Ties	Goals against	Saves	Shut outs	SV %	GAA
Zach Stejskal	9	622	4	4	0	19	250	0	.929	1.83
Ryan Fanti	20	1169	11	7	2	46	446	0	.907	2.36
Empty Net	-	8	-	-	-	1	-	-	-	-
Total	28	1799	15	11	2	66	696	0	.913	2.20

== Rankings ==
Poll	Week																					
Poll	Pre	1	2	3	4	5	6	7	8	9	10	11	12	13	14	15	16	17	18	19	20	21 (Final)
USCHO.com	3	3	3	3	3	3	4	4	5	7	7	6	5	4	8	10	9	9	9	9	-	3
USA Today	3	3	4	3	3	3	4	4	5	8	7	6	6	4	8	10	9	9	9	9	5	4

USCHO did not release a poll in week 20.

== Awards and honors ==
Player	Award	Ref
Nick Swaney	NCHC First Team	
Noah Cates	NCHC Second Team	
Wyatt Kaiser	NCHC Third Team	
Cole Koepke	NCHC Third Team	
Wyatt Kaiser	NCHC Rookie Team	

== Players drafted into the NHL ==
=== 2021 NHL entry draft ===
Round	Pick	Player	NHL team
7	204	Connor Kelley	Chicago Blackhawks

† incoming freshman
