= 2020–21 Omaha Mavericks men's ice hockey season =

NCAA Tournament, Regional semifinals
- Conference: 4th NCHC
- Home ice: Baxter Arena

Rankings
- USCHO.com: 13
- USA Today/ US Hockey Magazine: 14

Record
- Overall: 14–11–1
- Conference: 14–9–1–4–0–1
- Home: 4–3–0
- Road: 4–3–0
- Neutral: 6–5–1

Coaches and captains
- Head coach: Mike Gabinet
- Assistant coaches: Dave Noël-Bernier; Paul Jerrard
- Captain: Kevin Conley
- Alternate captain(s): Nathan Knoepke; Nolan Sullivan; Taylor Ward

The 2020–21 Omaha Mavericks men's ice hockey season was the 24th season of play for the program and the 8th in the NCHC conference. The Mavericks represented the University of Nebraska Omaha and were coached by Mike Gabinet, in his 4th season.

== Season ==
As a result of the ongoing COVID-19 pandemic the entire college ice hockey season was delayed. Because the NCAA had previously announced that all winter sports athletes would retain whatever eligibility they possessed through at least the following year, none of Omaha's players would lose a season of play. However, the NCAA also approved a change in its transfer regulations that would allow players to transfer and play immediately rather than having to sit out a season, as the rules previously required.

Due to ongoing COVID-19 concerns, The entire NCHC conference began the season playing in Omaha, Nebraska. Despite playing all of these game in their home building, the Mavericks didn't officially play a home game in December. All games were considered 'neutral site' matches but Omaha was still able to use the familiar surroundings to get off to a good start. It took the Mavs a few games to get used to the compressed schedule but, by the end of the third week of play, the team had shot up into the middle of the top-20 rankings. UNO would hover around that point for the remainder of the regular season and, despite losing 3 out of 4 to North Dakota at the end, Omaha was projected to make the NCAA Tournament under normal circumstances.

When their conference tournament began, Omaha was hoping it could at least improve its standing and get a better matchup in late March. However, the team was outplayed by Denver for most of the contest and lost the quarterfinal 4–5. As a result, Omaha was ranked 14th by the selection committee and placed opposite to Minnesota in the regional semifinals. The Mavericks never really were in the game, surrendering the first three goals before ending the first down 1–3. The Gophers scored an additional trio in the second and then skated to a rather easy 7–2 win over Omaha.

Jacob Zab sat out the season.

== Departures ==
Player	Position	Nationality	Cause
Colby Enns	Defenseman	United States	Transferred to Northern Michigan
Ryan Jones	Defenseman	United States	Graduation (Signed with Rochester Americans)
Zach Jordan	Forward	United States	Graduation (Signed with Cleveland Monsters)
Tristan Keck	Forward	Canada	Graduation (Signed with Coventry Blaze)
Teemu Pulkkinen	Forward	Finland	Graduation (Signed with Mikkelin Jukurit)
Dean Stewart	Defenseman	Canada	Graduation (Signed with Wichita Thunder)

== Recruiting ==
Player	Position	Nationality	Age	Notes
Kaden Bohlsen	Forward	United States	19	Willmar, MN
Brock Bremer	Forward	United States	21	Forest Lake, MN
Jimmy Glynn	Forward	United States	20	Lemont, IL
Jake Harrison	Defenseman	Canada	21	West Kelowna, BC
Nolan Krenzen	Defenseman	United States	19	Duluth, MN
Matt Miller	Forward	United States	21	Leo, IN
Jack Randl	Forward	United States	20	Carpentersville, IL
Jonny Tychonick	Defenseman	Canada	20	Calgary, AB; transfer from North Dakota; selected 48th overall in 2018

== Roster ==
As of March 1, 2021.

No.	Nat.	Player	Class	Pos	Height	Weight	DoB	Hometown	Previous team	NHL rights
2	(United States)	Jason Smallidge	Junior	D	6' 2" (1.88 m)	193 lb (88 kg)	1998-05-20	Eagan, Minnesota	Youngstown Phantoms (USHL)	—
3	(Canada)	Kirby Proctor	Sophomore	D	6' 3" (1.91 m)	197 lb (89 kg)	2001-04-20	Okotoks, Alberta	Des Moines Buccaneers (USHL)	—
4	(Canada)	Brandon Scanlin	Sophomore	D	6' 4" (1.93 m)	213 lb (97 kg)	1999-06-02	Hamilton, Ontario	Brooks Bandits (AJHL)	—
5	(United States)	John Schuldt	Junior	D	6' 4" (1.93 m)	216 lb (98 kg)	1997-02-10	Minnetonka, Minnesota	Fargo Force (USHL)	—
7	(United States)	Nate Knoepke (A)	Senior	D	6' 3" (1.91 m)	205 lb (93 kg)	1999-04-08	Farmington, Minnesota	Sioux City Musketeers (USHL)	—
9	(Canada)	Ryan Brushett	Sophomore	F	6' 0" (1.83 m)	180 lb (82 kg)	1998-06-14	Verdun, Quebec	Powell River Kings (BCHL)	—
10	(United States)	Kevin Conley (C)	Senior	F	6' 0" (1.83 m)	191 lb (87 kg)	1997-02-17	Wausau, Wisconsin	Sioux Falls Stampede (USHL)	—
11	(United States)	Nolan Sullivan (A)	Sophomore	F	5' 11" (1.8 m)	203 lb (92 kg)	1999-05-21	Eden Prairie, Minnesota	Muskegon Lumberjacks (USHL)	—
12	(United States)	Nolan Krenzen	Freshman	D	5' 9" (1.75 m)	180 lb (82 kg)	2001-07-13	Duluth, Minnesota	Omaha Lancers (USHL)	—
13	(United States)	Chayse Primeau	Junior	F	6' 3" (1.91 m)	185 lb (84 kg)	1997-09-15	Margate City, New Jersey	Dubuque Fighting Saints (USHL)	—
16	(Sweden)	Martin Sundberg	Senior	F	6' 4" (1.93 m)	197 lb (89 kg)	1996-12-04	Linköping, Sweden	Fargo Force (USHL)	—
17	(Canada)	Taylor Ward (A)	Junior	F	6' 2" (1.88 m)	207 lb (94 kg)	1998-03-31	Kelowna, British Columbia	Penticton Vees (BCHL)	—
20	(Canada)	Jonny Tychonick	Junior	D	6' 0" (1.83 m)	187 lb (85 kg)	2000-03-03	Calgary, Alberta	North Dakota (NCHC)	OTT, 48th overall 2018
21	(United States)	Noah Prokop	Sophomore	F	6' 1" (1.85 m)	198 lb (90 kg)	2000-01-15	Littleton, Colorado	Green Bay Gamblers (USHL)	—
22	(United States)	Jordan Klehr	Graduate	D	5' 10" (1.78 m)	197 lb (89 kg)	1997-03-18	Lino Lakes, Minnesota	Shattuck-Saint Mary's (Midget AAA)	—
23	(United States)	Travis Kothenbeutel	Junior	F	5' 9" (1.75 m)	177 lb (80 kg)	1997-01-10	Sauk Rapids, Minnesota	Austin Bruins (NAHL)	—
24	(United States)	Jimmy Glynn	Freshman	F	5' 10" (1.78 m)	168 lb (76 kg)	2000-02-24	Lemont, Illinois	Dubuque Fighting Saints (USHL)	—
26	(United States)	Brock Bremer	Freshman	F	5' 5" (1.65 m)	140 lb (64 kg)	1999-08-26	Forest Lake, Minnesota	Lincoln Stars (USHL)	—
27	(United States)	Matt Miller	Freshman	F	6' 2" (1.88 m)	194 lb (88 kg)	1999-09-04	Leo, Indiana	Lincoln Stars (USHL)	—
28	(United States)	Jack Randl	Sophomore	F	5' 10" (1.78 m)	175 lb (79 kg)	2000-05-07	Carpentersville, Illinois	Omaha Lancers (USHL)	—
29	(United States)	Kaden Bohlsen	Freshman	F	6' 3" (1.91 m)	192 lb (87 kg)	2001-01-10	Willmar, Minnesota	Fargo Force (USHL)	—
31	(United States)	Isaiah Saville	Sophomore	G	6' 1" (1.85 m)	196 lb (89 kg)	2000-09-21	Anchorage, Alaska	Tri-City Storm (USHL)	VGK, 135th overall 2019
35	(United States)	Jacob Zab	Sophomore	G	5' 9" (1.75 m)	175 lb (79 kg)	1998-04-12	Mentor, Ohio	Pittsburgh Vengeance (USPHL)	—
36	(Canada)	Austin Roden	Sophomore	G	6' 0" (1.83 m)	183 lb (83 kg)	1998-04-30	Victoria, British Columbia	Merritt Centennials (BCHL)	—
40	(United States)	Tyler Weiss	Junior	F	5' 11" (1.8 m)	146 lb (66 kg)	2000-01-03	Raleigh, North Carolina	USNTDP (USHL)	COL, 109th overall 2018
44	(Canada)	Jake Harrison	Freshman	D	5' 9" (1.75 m)	179 lb (81 kg)	1999-04-13	Kelowna, British Columbia	West Kelowna Warriors (BCHL)	—
45	(United States)	Joey Abate	Sophomore	F	6' 2" (1.88 m)	188 lb (85 kg)	1998-09-26	Bloomingdale, Illinois	Youngstown Phantoms (USHL)	—
47	(Canada)	Alex Roy	Sophomore	D	6' 7" (2.01 m)	215 lb (98 kg)	1998-09-21	Beaumont, Quebec	Jamestown Rebels (NAHL)	—
48	(United States)	Josh Boyer	Sophomore	F	6' 3" (1.91 m)	200 lb (91 kg)	1999-10-07	Wasilla, Alaska	Sioux City Musketeers (USHL)	—

== Standings ==
2020–21 National Collegiate Hockey Conference Standings
	Conference record											Overall record					
	GP	W	L	T	OTW	OTL	3/SW	PTS	PT%	GF	GA	GP	W	L	T	GF	GA
#5 North Dakota †*	24	18	5	1	2	1	0	54	.750	94	47	29	22	6	1	114	57
#2 St. Cloud State	24	15	9	0	3	3	0	45	.625	78	64	31	20	11	0	101	84
#3 Minnesota Duluth	24	13	9	2	1	2	1	43	.597	72	54	28	15	11	2	84	66
#13 Omaha	24	14	9	1	4	0	1	40	.556	79	69	26	14	11	1	85	81
Denver	22	9	12	1	0	2	1	31	.470	61	60	24	11	13	1	67	66
Western Michigan	24	10	11	3	1	0	1	33	.458	73	84	25	10	12	3	77	89
Colorado College	22	4	16	2	0	2	2	18	.273	35	77	23	4	17	2	36	79
Miami	24	5	17	2	0	1	0	18	.250	46	83	25	5	18	2	48	89
Championship: March 16, 2021 † indicates conference regular season champion (Penrose Cup) * indicates conference tournament champion (Frozen Faceoff Championship Trophy); Rankings: USCHO.com Top 20 Poll

== Schedule and results ==
Date	Time	Opponent^{#}	Rank^{#}	Site	TV	Decision	Result	Attendance	Record
Regular season
December 1	3:35 PM	vs. #3 Minnesota Duluth		Baxter Arena • Omaha, Nebraska		Saville	L 3–5	0	0–1–0 (0–1–0)
December 3	7:35 PM	vs. #17 Western Michigan		Baxter Arena • Omaha, Nebraska		Saville	W 10–2	0	1–1–0 (1–1–0)
December 5	4:05 PM	vs. Miami		Baxter Arena • Omaha, Nebraska		Saville	W 2–1 ^{OT}	0	2–1–0 (2–1–0)
December 6	8:05 PM	vs. St. Cloud State		Baxter Arena • Omaha, Nebraska		Saville	L 3–5	0	2–2–0 (2–2–0)
December 9	7:35 PM	vs. Colorado College	#18	Baxter Arena • Omaha, Nebraska	AT&T RM	Saville	W 6–1	0	3–2–0 (3–2–0)
December 12	8:05 PM	vs. Miami	#18	Baxter Arena • Omaha, Nebraska		Saville	L 0–1	0	3–3–0 (3–3–0)
December 13	8:05 PM	vs. #13 St. Cloud State	#18	Baxter Arena • Omaha, Nebraska		Roden	W 2–0	0	4–3–0 (4–3–0)
December 16	3:35 PM	vs. #3 Minnesota Duluth	#17	Baxter Arena • Omaha, Nebraska		Saville	T 2–2 ^{SOW}	0	4–3–1 (4–3–1)
December 18	3:35 PM	vs. Western Michigan	#17	Baxter Arena • Omaha, Nebraska		Saville	W 6–5	0	5–3–1 (5–3–1)
December 21	12:05 PM	vs. Colorado College	#17	Baxter Arena • Omaha, Nebraska		Saville	W 3–0	0	6–3–1 (6–3–1)
January 18	8:07 PM	at Colorado College	#11	Broadmoor World Arena • Colorado Springs, Colorado		Saville	W 3–2	0	7–3–1 (7–3–1)
January 19	8:07 PM	at Colorado College	#11	Broadmoor World Arena • Colorado Springs, Colorado		Roden	W 3–2 ^{OT}	0	8–3–1 (8–3–1)
January 23	6:07 PM	vs. #19 Denver	#11	Baxter Arena • Omaha, Nebraska		Saville	L 1–4	1,322	8–4–1 (8–4–1)
January 24	6:00 PM	vs. #19 Denver	#11	Baxter Arena • Omaha, Nebraska		Saville	W 5–2	611	9–4–1 (9–4–1)
January 29	6:00 PM	vs. #2 North Dakota	#9	Baxter Arena • Omaha, Nebraska	CBSSN	Saville	L 2–6	1,429	9–5–1 (9–5–1)
January 30	6:07 PM	vs. #2 North Dakota	#9	Baxter Arena • Omaha, Nebraska		Saville	W 5–4	1,771	10–5–1 (10–5–1)
February 5	8:07 PM	at Denver	#9	Magness Arena • Denver, Colorado		Saville	L 1–3	0	10–6–1 (10–6–1)
February 6	7:07 PM	at Denver	#9	Magness Arena • Denver, Colorado	CBSSN	Saville	W 5–4 ^{OT}	0	11–6–1 (11–6–1)
February 12	7:07 PM	vs. Colorado College	#10	Baxter Arena • Omaha, Nebraska		Saville	W 7–1	1,248	12–6–1 (12–6–1)
February 13	6:07 PM	vs. Colorado College	#10	Baxter Arena • Omaha, Nebraska		Saville	W 3–2	1,524	13–6–1 (13–6–1)
February 19	7:37 PM	at #2 North Dakota	#9	Ralph Engelstad Arena • Grand Forks, North Dakota		Saville	L 1–4	2,420	13–7–1 (13–7–1)
February 20	6:07 PM	at #2 North Dakota	#9	Ralph Engelstad Arena • Grand Forks, North Dakota		Saville	L 1–7	2,514	13–8–1 (13–8–1)
February 26	7:07 PM	vs. #2 North Dakota	#11	Baxter Arena • Omaha, Nebraska		Saville	L 2–4	1,979	13–9–1 (13–9–1)
March 5	7:37 PM	at #1 North Dakota	#12	Ralph Engelstad Arena • Grand Forks, North Dakota		Saville	W 3–2 ^{OT}	2,723	14–9–1 (14–9–1)
NCHC Tournament
March 13	2:30 PM	vs. Denver*	#11	Ralph Engelstad Arena • Grand Forks, North Dakota		Saville	L 4–5	1,864	14–10–1
NCAA Tournament
March 27	8:00 PM	vs. #2 Minnesota*	#12	Budweiser Events Center • Loveland, Colorado (NCAA West Regional semifinal)	ESPNU	Saville	L 2–7	125	14–11–1
*Non-conference game. ^{#}Rankings from USCHO.com Poll. All times are in Central Time.

== Scoring statistics ==
Name	Position	Games	Goals	Assists	Points	PIM
Chayse Primeau	LW/RW	26	9	14	23	4
Tyler Weiss	C/LW	26	7	16	23	36
Taylor Ward	F	26	13	9	22	20
Kevin Conley	F	25	9	10	19	39
Brandon Scanlin	D	24	2	15	17	14
Matt Miller	RW	26	8	5	13	2
Brock Bremer	LW	25	6	7	13	10
Jack Randl	LW	24	5	8	13	8
Jason Smallidge	D	26	2	11	13	16
Martin Sundberg	RW	24	6	4	10	37
Nolan Sullivan	F	26	4	5	9	29
Kirby Proctor	D	26	3	6	9	12
Joey Abate	LW	22	1	8	9	63
Jonny Tychonick	D	23	3	5	8	16
Jimmy Glynn	F	25	2	5	7	2
Ryan Brushett	C	18	1	6	7	4
Nate Knoepke	D	25	4	2	6	6
Nolan Krenzen	D	21	0	4	4	14
Jake Harrison	D	10	0	3	3	2
Isaiah Saville	G	24	0	2	2	0
John Schuldt	D	1	0	0	0	0
Jordan Klehr	D	2	0	0	0	0
Travis Kothenbeutel	F	2	0	0	0	0
Kaden Bohlsen	F	3	0	0	0	2
Austin Roden	G	5	0	0	0	0
Josh Boyer	C	5	0	0	0	15
Alex Roy	D	9	0	0	0	8
Noah Prokop	C	24	0	0	0	21
Bench	-	-	-	-	-	16
Total			85	145	230	396

== Goaltending statistics ==
Name	Games	Minutes	Wins	Losses	Ties	Goals against	Saves	Shut outs	SV %	GAA
Austin Roden	5	212	2	0	0	10	106	1	.914	2.83
Isaiah Saville	24	1348	12	11	1	68	661	1	.907	3.03
Empty Net	-	12	-	-	-	3	-	-	-	-
Total	26	1573	14	11	1	81	767	2	.904	3.09

== Rankings ==
Poll	Week																					
Poll	Pre	1	2	3	4	5	6	7	8	9	10	11	12	13	14	15	16	17	18	19	20	21 (Final)
USCHO.com	NR	NR	NR	NR	18	17	11	11	11	10	11	9	9	10	9	11	12	11	12	12	-	13
USA Today	NR	NR	NR	NR	NR	NR	14	11	11	9	11	9	10	10	10	12	12	12	13	12	14	14

USCHO did not release a poll in week 20.

== Awards and honors ==
Player	Award	Ref
Chayse Primeau	NCHC Second Team	
Isaiah Saville	NCHC Third Team	
Brandon Scanlin	NCHC Third Team	

== Players drafted into the NHL ==
=== 2021 NHL entry draft ===
Round	Pick	Player	NHL team
4	119	Joaquim Lemay^{†}	Washington Capitals
4	125	Cameron Berg^{†}	New York Islanders

† incoming freshman
