= 2021 NCHC Tournament =

8th annual men's collegiate hockey tournament

2021 NCHC Men's ice hockey tournament
- Dates: March 12–16, 2021
- Teams: 8
- Finals site: Ralph Engelstad Arena; Grand Forks, North Dakota
- Champions: North Dakota (1st title)
- Winning coach: Brad Berry (1st title)
- MVP: Riese Gaber (North Dakota)
- NCHC Men's Ice Hockey Tournaments

The 2021 NCHC Tournament was the seventh tournament in league history. Typically the tournament is scheduled across two separate weekends in mid-march with quarterfinal games hosted on campus locations, while the final four games are played at the Xcel Energy Center in Saint Paul, Minnesota. However, on February 8, 2021, NCHC announced that the tournament would be played entirely in Grand Forks. By winning the tournament, North Dakota earned NCHC's automatic bid to the 2021 NCAA Division I Men's Ice Hockey Tournament.

== Format ==
Due to the COVID-19 pandemic, changes to the traditional tournament format were made for this season. All games will be single-elimination as opposed to a best-of-three games quarterfinals, and no third-place game will occur. All eight conference teams participate in the tournament. Teams are seeded No. 1 through No. 8 according to their final conference standing, with a tiebreaker system used to seed teams with an identical number of points accumulated. The top four seeded teams each earn home ice and host one of the lower seeded teams.

The winners of the quarterfinals round series will advance to the NCHC Frozen Faceoff. Teams are re-seeded No. 1 through No. 4 according to the final regular season conference standings.

=== Standings ===
2020–21 National Collegiate Hockey Conference Standings
	Conference record											Overall record					
	GP	W	L	T	OTW	OTL	3/SW	PTS	PT%	GF	GA	GP	W	L	T	GF	GA
#5 North Dakota †*	24	18	5	1	2	1	0	54	.750	94	47	29	22	6	1	114	57
#2 St. Cloud State	24	15	9	0	3	3	0	45	.625	78	64	31	20	11	0	101	84
#3 Minnesota Duluth	24	13	9	2	1	2	1	43	.597	72	54	28	15	11	2	84	66
#13 Omaha	24	14	9	1	4	0	1	40	.556	79	69	26	14	11	1	85	81
Denver	22	9	12	1	0	2	1	31	.470	61	60	24	11	13	1	67	66
Western Michigan	24	10	11	3	1	0	1	33	.458	73	84	25	10	12	3	77	89
Colorado College	22	4	16	2	0	2	2	18	.273	35	77	23	4	17	2	36	79
Miami	24	5	17	2	0	1	0	18	.250	46	83	25	5	18	2	48	89
Championship: March 16, 2021 † indicates conference regular season champion (Penrose Cup) * indicates conference tournament champion (Frozen Faceoff Championship Trophy); Rankings: USCHO.com Top 20 Poll

== Bracket ==
Teams are reseeded for the Semifinals

Quarterfinals; March 12–13
1	North Dakota	6
8	Miami	2
2	St. Cloud State	2
7	Colorado College	1
3	Minnesota-Duluth	5*
6	Western Michigan	4
4	Omaha	4
5	Denver	5

Semifinals; March 15
1	North Dakota	2*
5	Denver	1
2	St. Cloud State	3
3	Minnesota-Duluth	2

Championship; March 16
1	North Dakota	5
2	St. Cloud State	3

* denotes overtime periods

== Results ==
=== Quarterfinals ===
==== (1) North Dakota vs. (8) Miami ====
March 12, 2021; 7:30 PM	North Dakota	6 – 2 (4–1, 1–1, 1–0)	Miami	Ralph Engelstad Arena, Grand Forks, North Dakota; Attendance: 2,763

Game reference

Adam Scheel
Goalies
Ludvig Persson
Referees:
Dan Dreger
Nick Krebsbach
Linesmen:
Tony Aronson
Dan Cohen

(Kawaguchi, Bernard-Docker) Collin Adams (10) – 00:14	1–0
(Senden, Hain) Louis Jamernik (1) – 05:27	2–0
(Kawaguchi, Frisch) Collin Adams (11) – GW – 05:36	3–0
	3–1	11:14 – Phil Knies (3) (Gilling, Russell)
(Adams, Kawaguchi) Riese Gaber (9) – 14:24	4–1
(Sanderson, Adams) Jacob Bernard-Docker (3) – 29:50	5–1
	5–2	37:02 – Rourke Russell (7) (Cassetti)
(Adams, Kawaguchi) Brendan Budy (4) – 45:10	6–2

6 min
Penalties
20 min
46
Shots
28

==== (2) St. Cloud State vs. (7) Colorado College ====
March 12, 2021; 2:30 PM	St. Cloud State	2 – 1 (0–0, 1–1, 1–0)	Colorado College	Ralph Engelstad Arena, Grand Forks, North Dakota; Attendance: 1,923

Game reference

Dávid Hrenák
Goalies
Matt Vernon
Referees:
Joe Sullivan
Ryan Hersey
Linesmen:
Justin Hills
Dana Penkivech

	0–1	22:08 – McKay Flanagan (1) (Berzolla)
(Kupka, Fitzgerald) Zach Okabe (5) – 38:59	1–1
(Fitzgerald, Donohue) Nick Perbix (6) – GW – 56:05	2–1

4 min
Penalties
17 min
44
Shots
7

==== (3) Minnesota Duluth vs. (6) Western Michigan ====
March 13, 2021; 7:30 PM	Minnesota Duluth	5 – 4 (OT) (1–1, 1–2, 2–1, 1–0)	Western Michigan	Ralph Engelstad Arena, Grand Forks, North Dakota; Attendance: 2,167

Game reference

Ryan Fanti
Goalies
Brandon Bussi
Referees:
Nick Krebsbach
Joe Sullivan
Linesmen:
Dan Cohen
Dana Penkivech

(Roth, Anderson) Koby Bender (5) – 02:21	1–0
	1–1	09:59 – Jason Polin (6) (Glover, Washe)
	1–2	29:46 – PP – Ethen Frank (13) (Worrad, Joyaux)
(Laderoute, Koepke) Koby Bender (6) – PP – 05:27	2–2
	2–3	39:22 – Cole Gallant (5) (Frank, Fulp)
(N. Cates, J. Cates) Kobe Roth (12) – PP – 44:27	3–3
(J. Cates) Cole Koepke (13) – 47:32	4–3
	4–4	59:38 – EA – Jason Polin (7) (Passolt, Washe)
(unassisted) Connor Kelley (3) – GW – 66:24	5–4

8 min
Penalties
8 min
37
Shots
36

==== (4) Omaha vs. (5) Denver ====
March 13, 2021; 2:30 PM	Omaha	4 – 5 (2–1, 1–1, 1–3)	Denver	Ralph Engelstad Arena, Grand Forks, North Dakota; Attendance: 1,864

Game reference

Isaiah Saville
Goalies
Magnus Chrona
Referees:
Ryan Hersey
Tom Sterns
Linesmen:
Justin Hills
Tyler Liffrig

	0–1	08:25 – Hank Crone (5) (Heikkinen, Olischefski)
(Sullivan) Jason Smallidge (2) – 14:51	1–1
(Abate, Randl) Matt Miller (8) – 15:49	2–1
(Ward, Saville) Tyler Weiss (7) – 34:47	3–1
	3–2	36:57 – PP – Bobby Brink (2) (Demin, Guttman)
	3–3	40:42 – Mike Benning (2) (Guttman, Crone)
	3–4	51:52 – PP – Mike Benning (3) (Brink, Guttman)
(Conley, Glynn) Nate Knoepke (4) – 53:10	4–4
	4–5	54:57 – GW – Bo Hanson (1) (Caponi, Olischefski)

29 min
Penalties
25 min
28
Shots
38

=== Semifinals ===
==== (1) North Dakota vs. (5) Denver ====
March 15, 2021; 8:00 PM	North Dakota	2 – 1 (OT) (0–0, 0–1, 1–0, 1–0)	Denver	Ralph Engelstad Arena, Grand Forks, North Dakota; Attendance: 2,509

Game reference

Adam Scheel
Goalies
Magnus Chrona
Referees:
Tom Sterns
Joe Sullivan
Linesmen:
Dana Penkivech
Justin Hills

	0–1	25:52 – PP – Carter Savoie (13) (Brink, Benning)
(Pinto, Kiersted) Jasper Weatherby (12) – EA – 58:33	1–1
(Weatherby, Sanderson) Gavin Hain (5) – GW – 68:37	2–1

4 min
Penalties
4 min
32
Shots
18

==== (2) St. Cloud State vs. (3) Minnesota Duluth ====
March 15, 2021; 3:00 PM	St. Cloud State	3 – 2 (2–1, 1–1, 0–0)	Minnesota Duluth	Ralph Engelstad Arena, Grand Forks, North Dakota; Attendance: 1,957

Game reference

Dávid Hrenák
Goalies
Ryan Fanti
Referees:
Nick Krebsbach
Dan Dreger
Linesmen:
Tyler Liffrig
Tony Aronson

(Okabe, Donohue) Jami Krannila (10) – 07:02	1–0
	1–1	12:44 – PP – Kobe Roth (6) (J. Cates, Kaiser)
(Krannila, Meier) Kevin Fitzgerald (9) – PP – 17:52	2–1
	2–2	32:54 – Koby Bender (13) (Roth)
(Hammer, Jaycox) Chase Brand (4) – SH GW – 37:08	3–2

10 min
Penalties
12 min
34
Shots
26

=== Championship ===
==== (1) North Dakota vs. (2) St. Cloud State ====
March 16, 2021; 7:30 PM	North Dakota	5 – 3 (1–2, 0–0, 4–1)	St. Cloud State	Ralph Engelstad Arena, Grand Forks, North Dakota; Attendance: 3,000

Game reference

Adam Scheel
Goalies
Dávid Hrenák
Referees:
Nick Krebsbach
Ryan Hersey
Linesmen:
Tyler Liffrig
Justin Hills

	0–1	02:06 – PP – Zach Okabe (6) (Trejbal, Krannila)
(Kawaguchi, Adams) Riese Gaber (10) – 12:40	1–1
	1–2	16:46 – Seamus Donohue (1) (Meier, Kupka)
(Caulfield, Sanderson) Gavin Hain (6) – PP – 43:20	2–2
(Gaber, Adams) Jordan Kawaguchi (8) – 44:54	3–2
(Pinto, Kiersted) Riese Gaber (11) – PP GW – 45:22	4–2
	4–3	47:10 – Sam Hentges (8) (Fitzgerald, Trejbal)
(Frisch, Scheel) Jordan Kawaguchi (9) – EN – 59:51	5–3

6 min
Penalties
10 min
35
Shots
33

== Tournament awards ==
=== Frozen Faceoff All-Tournament Team ===
- F: Collin Adams (North Dakota)
- F: Gavin Hain (North Dakota)
- F: Riese Gaber* (North Dakota)
- D: Nick Perbix (St. Cloud State)
- D: Jake Sanderson (North Dakota)
- G: Adam Scheel (North Dakota)

* Most Valuable Player(s)
