= Ralph Engelstad Arena =

Indoor ice hockey arena at the University of North Dakota

- "The Ralph"
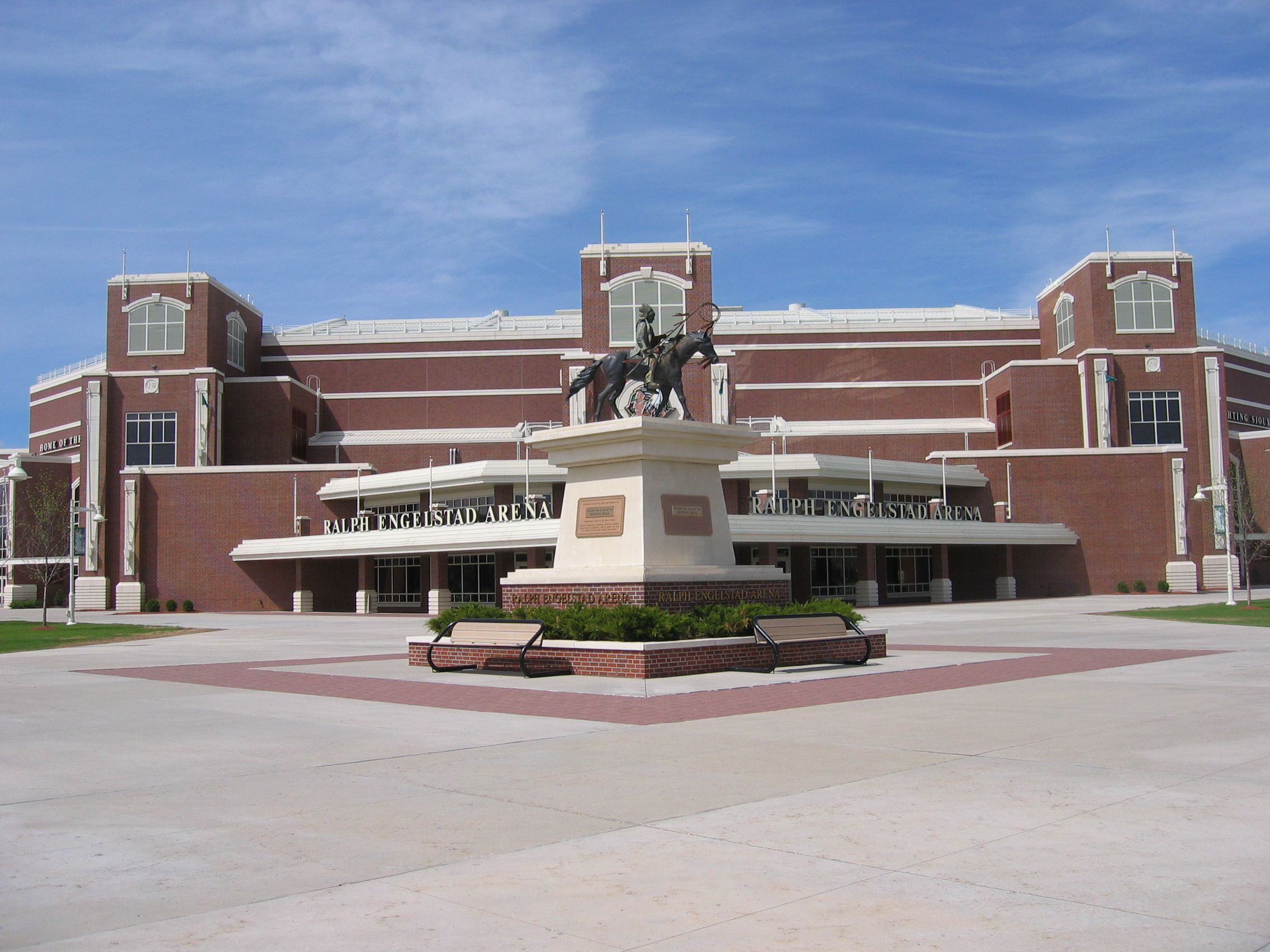

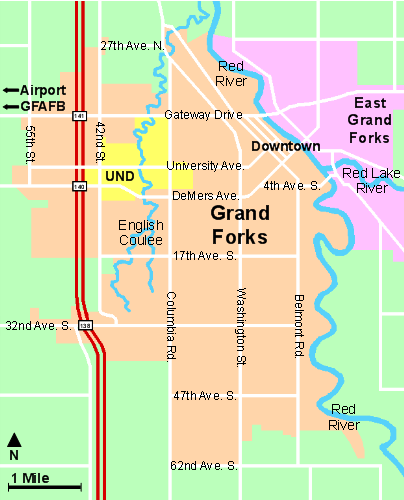
- Location of Ralph Engelstad Arena
- Address: One Ralph Engelstad Arena Dr
- Location: Grand Forks, North Dakota
- Coordinates: 47°55′40″N 97°04′17″W
- Owner: Engelstad Family Foundation
- Operator: Arena Network
- Capacity: Hockey: 11,643; Basketball: 12,119; Concert: 13,154
- Surface: 200' x 85' (hockey)

Construction
- Opened: October 5, 2001
- Cost: $104 million ($189 million in 2025 dollars)

Tenants
- North Dakota Fighting Hawks men's ice hockey (2001-present); Women's (2002–2017)

Ralph Engelstad Arena (REA), commonly called the Ralph, is an indoor arena located on the campus of the University of North Dakota (UND) in Grand Forks, North Dakota, and serves as the home of UND men's ice hockey. The arena was built by controversial UND alumnus Ralph Engelstad. The North Dakota Fighting Hawks men's hockey team is the tenant. The arena formerly hosted the defunct North Dakota women's hockey team.

== Facility ==
Ralph Engelstad Arena (REA), which seats 11,643, opened on October 5, 2001, and is located on the University of North Dakota (UND) campus. The REA is home to the UND men's ice hockey team (UND women's ice hockey team discontinued after 2016–17 season), and hosts select games for UND men's and women's basketball. The arena also hosts many non-athletic events including concerts and a yearly circus. Called the "Taj Mahal of hockey," the $104 million arena was built with materials that would not usually be found in such a facility. For instance, the concourses of the REA are covered in granite flooring, each spectator seat is made of Cherry wood and leather upholstery, escalators bring spectators between levels, and full-color LCD displays dot the arena. The REA has been called one of the finest facilities of its kind in the world. Former NHL hockey player Wayne Gretzky has called the structure "one of the most beautiful buildings we have in North America."

The REA complex has evolved to include more than just the main arena. A second Olympic-sized sheet of ice sits adjacent to the main arena. An addition to the main arena, The Betty Engelstad Sioux Center (or simply The Betty) was completed in 2004 and is now the home of UND's basketball and volleyball teams.

In 2015 the REA received a certificate of excellence from Trip Advisor for being one of the top-rated destinations in America.

In 2019 the REA announced they would install a new $6 million scoreboard. It was unveiled June 26, 2019, and is considered one of the best scoreboards in the country. Numerous other upgrades were completed including a new LED ribbon display wrapping around the entire arena.

During the COVID-19 pandemic the Ralph was being considered by the NHL to potentially host playoff games due to North Dakota's low population density and the high quality of the REA.

== Controversy ==
Midway during construction, Ralph Engelstad threatened to withdraw his funding if UND's Fighting Sioux sports teams were renamed in deference to political pressures. In an effort to make the prospect of removal a prohibitively costly measure, the Fighting Sioux logo was strategically placed in thousands of instances in the arena, including a large granite logo in the main concourse. After the NCAA barred several universities that use Native American imagery from hosting post-season tournaments or wearing such imagery in post-season play, UND sued the NCAA. A preliminary injunction was granted that would have allowed the Fighting Sioux to both host post-season events and wear their regular uniforms while the lawsuit was in progress. The legal papers filed in support of UND pointed out that the Florida State Seminoles have not been required to change their name, thus raising the possibility that the decision regarding the UND Fighting Sioux was arbitrary and capricious. In addition, the legal papers noted that UND has a Native American Studies program, has Native Americans on its faculty, and has a significant Native American student population.

The lawsuit with the NCAA was settled under the condition that UND had three years to gain tribal support from both Sioux nations in North Dakota, or retire the Sioux name and logo. By the time the three years had expired, permission had only been obtained from one of the two Sioux tribes. The government of the other tribe refused to permit a vote. The North Dakota Legislative Assembly passed a law requiring the University to retain the name in June 2011, but then repealed the law in November 2011. A statewide vote was held in June 2012, and the citizens of North Dakota voted to discontinue the Sioux name, and on October 22, 2012, crews removed signage that declared "Home of the Fighting Sioux" from the face of the building. The 2012 vote also banned UND from choosing a new name for three years. After the nickname ban expired in 2015, the university held two rounds of online fan voting from a suggested list of nicknames; the final selection of Fighting Hawks was adopted in November of that year.

== Notable events ==
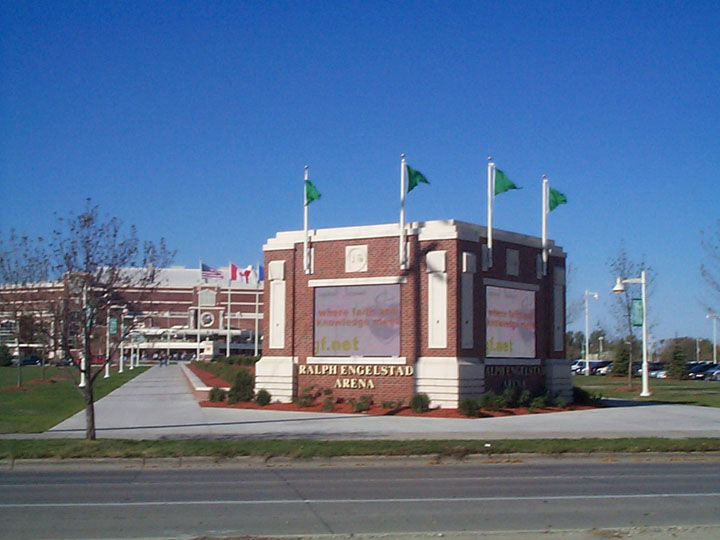
Sign in front of Ralph Engelstad Arena

The REA's inaugural hockey game was on October 5, 2001, and featured the Fighting Sioux men's team against the WCHA rival Minnesota Golden Gophers in the US Hockey Hall of Fame Game, in which Minnesota defeated North Dakota, 7–5. The REA hosted the West Regional in the 2006 NCAA Men's Division I Ice Hockey Tournament, with North Dakota playing in its home building.

The REA has hosted a number of non-NCAA ice hockey events, notably the 2005 World Junior Ice Hockey Championships with over 195,000 tickets sold, and the 2005 NCAA Men's Division II Basketball Championship. The Minnesota Wild and Winnipeg Jets have played several exhibition games at the arena as well. REA also hosted the 2008 World Men's Curling Championship, along with family-friendly ice shows such as Stars on Ice and Disney's High School Musical On Ice. The REA hosted the 2016 IIHF World U18 Championships.

Non-ice events at the REA have included concerts, by artists such as Tim McGraw, Brad Paisley, Sugarland, Kenny Chesney, Rascal Flatts, Toby Keith, Kelly Clarkson, Reba McEntire, Carrie Underwood, Clay Aiken, Incubus, Elton John, Eric Church, Little Big Town, and Florida Georgia Line, and a tennis match between Andre Agassi and Andy Roddick.

The Ralph and Fargo's Scheels Arena share hosting duties for the North Dakota High School Activities Association State Boys' and Girls' Hockey Tournament, usually taking place during the last weekend in February. REA typically hosts the tournament in even-numbered years with Scheels Arena hosting in odd-numbered years.
