= List of Miami RedHawks men's ice hockey seasons =

−This is a list of seasons completed by the Miami University RedHawks men's ice hockey team.

Miami has made several appearances in the NCAA Division I men's ice hockey tournament, reaching the championship game in 2009.

== Season-by-season results ==
NAIA/NCAA D-I Champions	NAIA/NCAA Frozen Four	Conference regular season champions	Conference Playoff Champions

Season	Conference	Regular season (Note: Code explanation; GP—Games Played, W—Wins, L—Losses, T—Tied games, OTW—Overtime Wins, OTL—Overtime Loses, 3/SW—Win in 3 on 3 overtime or shootout, Pts—Points*)														Conference Tournament Results	National Tournament Results
Season	Conference	Conference									Overall					Conference Tournament Results	National Tournament Results
Season	Conference	GP	W	L	T	OTW	OTL	3/SW	Pts*	Finish	GP	W	L	T	%	Conference Tournament Results	National Tournament Results
Division I
Steve Cady (1978 — 1985)
1978–79	Independent	-	-	-	-	-	-	-	-	-	37	22	14	1	.608		
1979–80	Independent	-	-	-	-	-	-	-	-	-	38	22	13	3	.618		
1980–81	Independent	-	-	-	-	-	-	-	-	-	35	16	17	2	.486		
1981–82	CCHA	28	9	18	1	-	-	-	19	11th	36	16	19	1	.458		
1982–83	CCHA	32	15	16	1	-	-	-	31	6th	36	18	17	1	.514	Lost Quarterfinal series, 8–10 (Ohio State)	
1983–84	CCHA	30	10	20	0	-	-	-	.333	10th	37	13	23	1	.365		
1984–85	CCHA	32	10	19	3	-	-	-	23	8th	40	14	23	3	.388	Lost Quarterfinal series, 4–11 (Michigan State)	
Bill Davidge (1985 — 1989)
1985–86	CCHA	32	3	27	2	-	-	-	8	9th	38	8	28	2	.237		
1986–87	CCHA	32	8	24	0	-	-	-	16	9th	39	8	31	0	.205		
1987–88	CCHA	32	7	24	1	-	-	-	15	9th	38	12	25	1	.329		
1988–89	CCHA	32	8	24	0	-	-	-	16	9th	38	11	27	0	.289		
George Gwozdecky (1989 — 1994)
1989–90	CCHA	32	8	21	3	-	-	-	19	7th	40	12	24	4	.350	Lost Quarterfinal series, 0–2 (Lake Superior State)	
1990–91	CCHA	32	3	26	3	-	-	-	9	9th	37	5	29	3	.176		
1991–92	CCHA	32	12	14	6	-	-	-	30	5th	40	18	16	6	.525	Won Quarterfinal series, 2–0 (Western Michigan); Lost Semifinal, 2–6 (Michigan)	
1992–93	CCHA	30	22	3	5	-	-	-	49	1st	41	27	9	5	.720	Won First round series, 2–0 (Ohio State); Won Semifinal, 4–3 (OT) (Ferris State); Lost CCHA Championship, 0–3 (Lake Superior State)	Lost Regional semifinal, 1–3 (Wisconsin)
1993–94	CCHA	30	17	12	1	-	-	-	35	5th	38	21	16	1	.566	Won First round series, 2–0 (Alaska–Fairbanks); Lost Quarterfinal, 3–4 (Western Michigan)	
Mark Mazzoleni (1994 — 1999)
1994–95	CCHA	27	13	8	6	-	-	-	32	T–4th	39	18	15	6	.538	Won Quarterfinal series, 2–0 (Ferris State); Lost Play-In, 2–5 (Lake Superior State)	
1995–96	CCHA	30	9	17	4	-	-	-	22	7th	36	10	22	4	.333	Lost First round series, 0–2 (Michigan)	
1996–97	CCHA	27	19	7	1	-	-	-	39	2nd	40	27	12	1	.688	Won Quarterfinal series, 2–0 (Ohio State); Lost Semifinal, 3–4 (OT) (Michigan State)	Lost Regional Quarterfinal, 2–4 (Cornell)
Program name changed to RedHawks
1997–98	CCHA	30	14	12	4	-	-	-	32	5th	37	19	14	4	.568	Lost Quarterfinal series, 0–2 (Northern Michigan)	
1998–99	CCHA	30	9	17	4	-	-	-	22	9th	36	11	20	5	.375		
Enrico Blasi (1999 — 2019)
1999–00	CCHA	28	10	15	3	-	-	-	23	T–9th	36	13	20	3	.403	Lost Quarterfinal series, 0–2 (Michigan State)	
2000–01	CCHA	28	17	10	1	-	-	-	25	T–2nd	38	20	16	2	.553	Lost Quarterfinal series, 0–2 (Bowling Green)	
2001–02	CCHA	28	9	17	2	-	-	-	20	10th	36	12	22	2	.361	Lost First round series, 0–2 (Northern Michigan)	
2002–03	CCHA	28	13	12	3	-	-	-	29	T–5th	41	21	17	3	.549	Lost First round series, 1–2 (Notre Dame)	
2003–04	CCHA	28	17	8	3	-	-	-	37	2nd	41	23	14	4	.610	Won First round series, 2–0 (Lake Superior State); Lost Semifinal, 3–4 (OT) (Ohio State); Won Third Place, 4–0 (Northern Michigan)	Lost Regional semifinal, 2–3 (Denver)
2004–05	CCHA	28	11	13	4	-	-	-	26	7th	38	15	18	5	.461	Lost First round series, 0–2 (Michigan State)	
2005–06	CCHA	28	20	6	2	-	-	-	42	1st	39	26	9	4	.718	Won Quarterfinal series, 2–0 (Western Michigan); Won Semifinal, 5–2 (Northern Michigan); Lost Championship, 1–2 (Michigan State)	Lost Regional semifinal, 0–5 (Boston College)
2006–07	CCHA	28	16	8	4	-	-	-	36	3rd	42	24	14	4	.619	Lost Quarterfinal series, 0–2 (Lake Superior State)	Won Regional semifinal, 2–1 (New Hampshire); Lost Regional final, 0–4 (Boston College)
2007–08	CCHA	28	21	6	1	-	-	-	43	2nd	42	33	8	1	.798	Won Quarterfinal series, 2–0 (Bowling Green); Won Semifinal, 2–1 (OT) (Notre Dame); Lost Championship, 1–2 (Michigan)	Won Regional semifinal, 3–2 (OT) (Air Force); Lost Regional final, 3–4 (OT) (Boston College)
2008–09	CCHA	28	17	7	4	-	-	2	40	T–2nd	41	23	13	5	.622	Lost CCHA Quarterfinal series, 1–2 (Northern Michigan)	Won Regional semifinal, 2–4 (Denver); Won Regional final, 2–1 (Minnesota–Duluth); Won National semifinal, 4–1 (Bemidji State); Lost National Championship, 3–4 (OT) (Boston University)
2009–10	CCHA	28	21	2	5	-	-	2	70	1st	44	29	8	7	.739	Won Quarterfinal series, 2–0 (Ohio State); Lost Semifinal, 2–5 (Michigan); Won Third Place, 2–1 (Ferris State)	Won Regional semifinal, 2–1 (Alabama–Huntsville); Won Regional final, 3–2 (2OT) (Michigan); Lost National semifinal, 1–7 (Boston College)
2010–11	CCHA	28	16	7	5	-	-	2	55	3rd	39	23	10	6	.667	Won Quarterfinal series, 2–0 (Alaska); Won Semifinal, 6–2 (Notre Dame); Won Championship, 5–2 (Western Michigan)	Lost Regional semifinal, 1–3 (New Hampshire)
2011–12	CCHA	28	15	11	2	-	-	1	48	4th	41	24	15	2	.610	Won Quarterfinal series, 2–0 (Michigan State); Lost Semifinal, 2–6 (Western Michigan); Won Third Place, 4–1 (Bowling Green)	Lost Regional semifinal, 3–4 (OT) (Massachusetts–Lowell)
2012–13	CCHA	28	17	7	4	-	-	4	59	1st	42	25	12	5	.655	Won Quarterfinal series, 2–1 (Michigan State); Lost Semifinal, 2–6 (Michigan)	Won Regional semifinal, 4–0 (Minnesota State); Lost Regional final, 1–4 (St. Cloud State)
2013–14	NCHC	24	6	17	1	-	-	1	20	8th	38	15	20	3	.434	Won Quarterfinal series, 2–0 (St. Cloud State); Won Semifinal, 3–0 (North Dakota); Lost Championship, 3–4 (Denver)	
2014–15	NCHC	24	14	9	1	-	-	1	44	2nd	40	25	14	1	.638	Won Quarterfinal series, 2–1 (Western Michigan); Won Semifinal, 6–3 (Denver); Won Championship, 3–2 (St. Cloud State)	Lost Regional semifinal, 5–7 (Providence)
2015–16	NCHC	24	9	13	2	-	-	2	31	5th	36	15	18	3	.458	Lost First round series, 0–2 (Minnesota–Duluth)	
2016–17	NCHC	24	5	14	5	-	-	3	23	7th	36	9	20	7	.347	Lost NCHC First round series, 0–2 (Minnesota–Duluth)	
2017–18	NCHC	24	6	14	4	-	-	0	24	8th	37	12	20	5	.333	Lost NCHC First round series, 1–2 (St. Cloud State)	
2018–19	NCHC	24	5	17	2	-	-	1	18	T–7th	38	11	23	4	.342	Lost NCHC First round series, 0–2 (St. Cloud State)	
Chris Bergeron (2019 — 2024)
2019–20	NCHC	24	5	16	3	-	-	2	20	7th	34	8	21	5	.309	Tournament cancelled	
2020–21	NCHC	24	5	17	2	0	1	0	.250	8th	25	5	18	2	.240	Lost NCHC Quarterfinal, 2–6 (North Dakota)	
2021–22	NCHC	24	4	19	1	0	3	1	17	8th	36	7	27	2	.222	Lost NCHC Quarterfinal series, 0–2 (Denver)	
2022–23	NCHC	24	3	18	3	0	2	0	14	8th	36	8	24	4	.278	Lost NCHC Quarterfinal series, 0–2 (Denver)	
2023–24	NCHC	24	1	21	2	0	2	0	7	8th	36	7	26	3	.236	Lost NCHC Quarterfinal series, 0–2 (North Dakota)	
Anthony Noreen (2024 — Present)
2024–25	NCHC	24	0	23	1	0	3	0	7	9th	34	3	28	3	.132		
Totals											GP	W	L	T	%	Championships	
Regular season											1664	713	802	149	.473	4 CCHA Championships	
Conference Post-season											98	43	55	0	.439	1 CCHA tournament championship, 1 NCHC tournament championship	
NCAA Post-season											20	8	12	0	.400	12 NCAA Tournament appearances	
Regular season and Post-season Record											1782	764	869	149	.471		

* Winning percentage is used when conference schedules are unbalanced.
