= Miami RedHawks men's ice hockey statistical leaders =

The Miami RedHawks men's ice hockey statistical leaders are individual statistical leaders of the Miami RedHawks men's ice hockey program in various categories, including goals, assists, points, and saves. Within those areas, the lists identify single-game, single-season, and career leaders. The RedHawks represent Miami University in the NCAA's National Collegiate Hockey Conference.

Miami began competing in intercollegiate ice hockey in 1978. These lists are updated through the end of the 2020–21 season.

== Goals ==
Career
| Rk | Player | Goals | Seasons |
|---|---|---|---|
| 1 | Rick Kuraly | 101 | 1979–80 1980–81 1981–82 1982–83 |
| 2 | Ryan Jones | 90 | 2004–05 2005–06 2006–07 2007–08 |
| 3 | Vern Sketchley | 80 | 1978–79 1979–80 1980–81 1981–82 |
| 4 | Mike Orn | 76 | 1984–85 1985–86 1986–87 1987–88 |
| 5 | Bill Bok | 72 | 1978–79 1979–80 1980–81 1981–82 |
| 6 | Ken House | 70 | 1988–89 1989–90 1990–91 1991–92 |
| 7 | Kevyn Adams | 69 | 1992–93 1993–94 1994–95 1995–96 |
| | Carter Camper | 69 | 2007–08 2008–09 2009–10 2010–11 |
| 9 | Brian Savage | 66 | 1990–91 1991–92 1992–93 |
| | Reilly Smith | 66 | 2009–10 2010–11 2011–12 |

Season
| Rk | Player | Goals | Season |
|---|---|---|---|
| 1 | Gary DeLonge | 39 | 1978–79 |
| 2 | Craig Fisher | 37 | 1989–90 |
| | Brian Savage | 37 | 1992–93 |
| 4 | Bill Bok | 32 | 1978–79 |
| 5 | Rick Kuraly | 31 | 1980–81 |
| | Ryan Jones | 31 | 2007–08 |
| 7 | Reilly Smith | 30 | 2011–12 |
| 8 | Rick Kuraly | 29 | 1979–80 |
| | John Ciotti | 29 | 1984–85 |
| | Ryan Jones | 29 | 2006–07 |

Single Game
| Rk | Player | Goals | Season | Opponent |
|---|---|---|---|---|
| 1 | Rick Kuraly | 5 | 1980–81 | Lake Forest |

== Assists ==
Career
| Rk | Player | Assists | Seasons |
|---|---|---|---|
| 1 | Steve Morris | 138 | 1979–80 1980–81 1981–82 1982–83 |
| 2 | Austin Czarnik | 123 | 2011–12 2012–13 2013–14 2014–15 |
| 3 | Carter Camper | 114 | 2007–08 2008–09 2009–10 2010–11 |
| 4 | Dan Boyle | 107 | 1994–95 1995–96 1996–97 1997–98 |
| 5 | Kevyn Adams | 103 | 1992–93 1993–94 1994–95 1995–96 |
| | Kevin Beaton | 103 | 1979–80 1980–81 1981–82 1982–83 |
| 7 | Bobby Marshall | 102 | 1990–91 1991–92 1992–93 1993–94 |
| 8 | Andy Miele | 99 | 2007–08 2008–09 2009–10 2010–11 |
| 9 | Bill Bok | 97 | 1978–79 1979–80 1980–81 1981–82 |
| 10 | Mitch Ganzak | 92 | 2004–05 2005–06 2006–07 2007–08 |

Season
| Rk | Player | Assists | Season |
|---|---|---|---|
| 1 | John Malloy | 52 | 1978–79 |
| 2 | Andy Miele | 47 | 2010–11 |
| 3 | Pete Shipman | 45 | 1978–79 |
| 4 | Dan Boyle | 43 | 1996–97 |
| | Bobby Marshall | 43 | 1992–93 |
| 6 | Chris Bergeron | 40 | 1992–93 |
| | Steve Morris | 40 | 1979–80 |
| 8 | Steve Morris | 38 | 1980–81 |
| | Carter Camper | 38 | 2010–11 |
| 10 | Austin Czarnik | 36 | 2014–15 |

Single Game
| Rk | Player | Assists | Season | Opponent |
|---|---|---|---|---|
| 1 | John Malloy | 6 | 1978–79 | Missouri |
| | Kevin Beaton | 6 | 1981–82 | Waterloo |

== Points ==
Career
| Rk | Player | Points | Seasons |
|---|---|---|---|
| 1 | Steve Morris | 202 | 1979–80 1980–81 1981–82 1982–83 |
| 2 | Carter Camper | 183 | 2007–08 2008–09 2009–10 2010–11 |
| 3 | Rick Kuraly | 179 | 1979–80 1980–81 1981–82 1982–83 |
| 4 | Kevyn Adams | 172 | 1992–93 1993–94 1994–95 1995–96 |
| 5 | Bill Bok | 169 | 1978–79 1979–80 1980–81 1981–82 |
| | Austin Czarnik | 169 | 2011–12 2012–13 2013–14 2014–15 |
| 7 | Andy Miele | 159 | 2007–08 2008–09 2009–10 2010–11 |
| 8 | Vern Sketchley | 158 | 1978–79 1979–80 1980–81 1981–82 |
| 9 | Todd Channell | 155 | 1982–83 1983–84 1984–85 1985–86 |
| 10 | Kevin Beaton | 150 | 1979–80 1980–81 1981–82 1982–83 |

Season
| Rk | Player | Points | Season |
|---|---|---|---|
| 1 | Gary DeLonge | 74 | 1978–79 |
| 2 | Pete Shipman | 71 | 1978–79 |
| | Andy Miele | 71 | 2010–11 |
| 4 | John Malloy | 68 | 1978–79 |
| 5 | Bill Bok | 66 | 1978–79 |
| | Craig Fisher | 66 | 1989–90 |
| 7 | Randy Robitaille | 61 | 1996–97 |
| | Chris Bergeron | 61 | 1992–93 |
| | Steve Morris | 61 | 1979–80 |
| 10 | Brian Savage | 58 | 1992–93 |

Single Game
| Rk | Player | Points | Season | Opponent |
|---|---|---|---|---|
| 1 | Gary DeLonge | 8 | 1978–79 | Cincinnati |

== Saves ==
Career
| Rk | Player | Saves | Seasons |
|---|---|---|---|
| 1 | Ryan Larkin | 3,199 | 2016–17 2017–18 2018–19 2019–20 |
| 2 | David Burleigh | 2,975 | 1999–00 2000–01 2001–02 2002–03 |
| 3 | Mark Michaud | 2,856 | 1988–89 1989–90 1990–91 1991–92 |
| 4 | Ludvig Persson | 2,451 | 2020–21 2021–22 2022–23 |
| 5 | Alain Chevrier | 2,440 | 1980–81 1981–82 1982–83 1983–84 |
| 6 | Steve McKichan | 2,244 | 1986–87 1987–88 1988–89 |
| 7 | Richard Shulmistra | 2,136 | 1990–91 1991–92 1992–93 1993–94 |
| 8 | Jeff Zatkoff | 2,051 | 2005–06 2006–07 2007–08 |
| 9 | Dan Kodatsky | 1,973 | 1978–79 1979–80 1980–81 1981–82 |
| 10 | Ryan McKay | 1,971 | 2012–13 2013–14 2014–15 2015–16 |

Season
| Rk | Player | Saves | Season |
|---|---|---|---|
| 1 | Ludvig Persson | 1027 | 2021–22 |
| 2 | Matteo Drobac | 982 | 2025–26 |
| 3 | Mark Michaud | 972 | 1989–90 |
| 4 | Steve McKichan | 916 | 1987–88 |
| 5 | Ryan Larkin | 905 | 2016–17 |
| 6 | David Burleigh | 901 | 2002–03 |
| 7 | Ludvig Persson | 891 | 2022–23 |
| 8 | Alain Chevrier | 886 | 1982–83 |
| 9 | Chuck Thuss | 864 | 1994–95 |
| | B. Crawford-West | 864 | 2004–05 |

Single Game
| Rk | Player | Saves | Season | Opponent |
|---|---|---|---|---|
| 1 | Lee Cannon | 57 | 1989–90 | W. Michigan |
