= 1995 CCHA men's ice hockey tournament =

Sports tournament

1995 CCHA Men's ice hockey tournament
- Dates: March 9–18, 1995
- Teams: 11
- Finals site: Joe Louis Arena; Detroit, Michigan
- Champions: Lake Superior State (4th title)
- Winning coach: Jeff Jackson (4th title)
- MVP: Wayne Strachan (Lake Superior State)
- CCHA Men's Ice Hockey Tournaments

The 1995 CCHA Men's Ice Hockey Tournament was the 24th CCHA Men's Ice Hockey Tournament. It was played between March 9 and March 18, 1995. Opening round play-in and quarterfinal games were played at campus sites, while the Finals play-in and 'final four' games were played at Joe Louis Arena in Detroit, Michigan. By winning the tournament, Lake Superior State received the Central Collegiate Hockey Association's automatic bid to the 1995 NCAA Division I Men's Ice Hockey Tournament.

== Format ==
The tournament featured three rounds of play. The teams that finished tenth and eleventh in the standings played a single play-in game to determine the final qualifier for the playoffs. In the quarterfinals, the first and tenth seeds, the second and ninth seeds, the third seed and eighth seeds, the fourth seed and seventh seeds and the fifth seed and sixth seeds played a best-of-three series, with the winners advancing to the semifinals. The lowest two remaining seeds played a play-in game to determine the last qualifier for the 'final four'. In the semifinals, the remaining highest and lowest seeds and second-highest and second-lowest seeds play a single game, with the winners advancing to the finals. The tournament champion receives an automatic bid to the 1995 NCAA Division I Men's Ice Hockey Tournament.

== Conference standings ==
Note: GP = Games played; W = Wins; L = Losses; T = Ties; PTS = Points; GF = Goals For; GA = Goals Against

1994–95 Central Collegiate Hockey Association standings
	Conference							Overall					
	GP	W	L	T	PTS	GF	GA	GP	W	L	T	GF	GA
Michigan†	27	22	4	1	45	151	74	39	30	8	1	218	109
Bowling Green	27	18	7	2	38	135	101	38	25	11	2	199	137
Michigan State	27	17	7	3	37	123	79	40	25	12	3	183	124
Lake Superior State*	27	14	9	4	32	114	78	41	23	12	6	176	125
Miami	27	13	8	6	32	88	87	39	18	15	6	129	132
Ferris State	27	9	14	4	22	82	111	36	12	20	4	113	157
Western Michigan	27	9	14	4	22	87	102	40	17	18	5	141	144
Illinois-Chicago	27	8	16	3	19	99	132	37	11	22	4	146	177
Notre Dame	27	7	19	1	15	77	126	37	11	25	1	121	168
Ohio State	27	3	22	2	8	76	142	38	7	29	2	112	195
Alaska-Fairbanks^								33	11	21	1	107	141
Championship: Lake Superior State † indicates conference regular season champion * indicates conference tournament champion^ Alaska-Fairbanks is an affiliate member and its games do not count towards the conference standings

== Bracket ==
Play-in; March 9
10	Ohio State	7
11	Alaska–Fairbanks	2

Quarterfinals; March 10–12
1	Michigan	7	4	–
10	Ohio State	2	0	–
2	Bowling Green	7	5	–
9	Notre Dame	2	4	–
3	Michigan State	6	4	–
8	Illinois–Chicago	4	2	–
4	Lake Superior State	7	5	–
7	Western Michigan	2	0	–
5	Miami	10	4	–
6	Ferris State	2	2	–

Finals Play-in; March 15
4	Lake Superior State	5
5	Miami	2

Semifinals; March 16
1	Michigan	4
4	Lake Superior State	5*
2	Bowling Green	3
3	Michigan State	4*

Championship; March 18
4	Lake Superior State	5
3	Michigan State	3

Note: * denotes overtime period(s)

=== Play-in ===
==== (10) Ohio State vs. (11) Alaska–Fairbanks ====
March 9	Ohio State	7 – 2	Alaska–Fairbanks	OSU Ice Rink

=== Quarterfinals ===
==== (1) Michigan vs. (10) Ohio State ====
Michigan	7 – 2	Ohio State	Yost Ice Arena

Michigan	4 – 0	Ohio State	Yost Ice Arena

Michigan won series 2–0

==== (2) Bowling Green vs. (9) Notre Dame ====
Bowling Green	7 – 2	Notre Dame	BGSU Ice Arena

Bowling Green	5 – 4	Notre Dame	BGSU Ice Arena

Bowling Green won series 2–0

==== (3) Michigan State vs. (8) Illinois–Chicago ====
Michigan State	6 – 4	Illinois–Chicago	Munn Ice Arena

Michigan State	4 – 3	Illinois–Chicago	Munn Ice Arena

Michigan State won series 2–0

==== (4) Lake Superior State vs. (7) Western Michigan ====
Lake Superior State	7 – 2	Western Michigan	Taffy Abel Arena

Lake Superior State	5 – 0	Western Michigan	Taffy Abel Arena

Lake Superior State won series 2–0

==== (5) Miami vs. (6) Ferris State ====
Miami	10 – 2	Ferris State	Goggin Ice Arena

Miami	4 – 2	Ferris State	Goggin Ice Arena

Miami won series 2–0

=== Finals Play-in ===
==== (4) Lake Superior State vs. (5) Miami ====
March 15	Lake Superior State	5 – 2	Miami	Joe Louis Arena

=== Semifinals ===
==== (1) Michigan vs. (4) Lake Superior State ====
March 16	Michigan	4 – 5	OT	Lake Superior State	Joe Louis Arena

==== (2) Bowling Green vs. (3) Michigan State ====
March 16	Bowling Green	3 – 4	OT	Michigan State	Joe Louis Arena

=== Championship ===
==== (3) Michigan State vs. (4) Lake Superior State ====
March 18	Michigan State	3 – 5	Lake Superior State	Joe Louis Arena

== Tournament awards ==
=== All-Tournament Team ===
- F Jason Trzcinski (Lake Superior State)
- F Bates Battaglia (Lake Superior State)
- F Wayne Strachan* (Lake Superior State)
- D Chris Slater (Michigan State)
- D Keith Aldridge (Lake Superior State)
- G Mike Buzak (Michigan State)

* Most Valuable Player(s)
