= 2020–21 St. Cloud State Huskies men's ice hockey season =

NCAA tournament, runner-up
- Conference: 2nd NCHC
- Home ice: Herb Brooks National Hockey Center

Rankings
- USCHO.com: 2
- USA Today/US Hockey Magazine: 2

Record
- Overall: 20–11–0
- Conference: 15–9–0–3–3–0
- Home: 6–2–0
- Road: 3–5–0
- Neutral: 11–4–0

Coaches and captains
- Head coach: Brett Larson
- Assistant coaches: Dave Shyiak; Nick Oliver; Matt Bertram
- Captain: Spencer Meier
- Alternate captain(s): Seamus Donohue; Lucas Jaycox; Kevin Fitzgerald

The 2020–21 St. Cloud State Huskies men's ice hockey season was the 86th season of play for the program, the 24th at the Division I level and the 8th in the NCHC conference. The Huskies represented St. Cloud State University and were coached by Brett Larson, in his 3rd season.

== Season ==
As a result of the ongoing COVID-19 pandemic the entire college ice hockey season was delayed. Because the NCAA had previously announced that all winter sports athletes would retain whatever eligibility they possessed through at least the following year, none of St. Cloud State's players would lose a season of play. However, the NCAA also approved a change in its transfer regulations that would allow players to transfer and play immediately rather than having to sit out a season, as the rules previously required.

=== Regular season ===
Due to ongoing COVID-19 concerns, St. Cloud joined the rest of the NCHC in Omaha, Nebraska for the first three weeks of the season. The Huskies started well, winning their first three matches and used some of the games to give their backup netminders a turn in goal. From the beginning, however, Dávid Hrenák was the team's go-to goalie. He helped the team swiftly climb into the top-20 and provided the team with the needed support to overcome then-number-one North Dakota. The win put St. Cloud on the map and by the end of the NCHC's Omaha bubble, the Huskies were in the top-10.

St. Cloud got a chance to prove they were worthy of their ranking with four consecutive games against #4 Minnesota Duluth. The Huskies lost the first match but then won three in a row and jumped into the top-5. Aside from the honor of being ranked so highly after beginning the season unranked, the Huskies were guaranteed a spot in the NCAA tournament if they could maintain their position. Unfortunately, the very next weekend they were swept by Western Michigan. The losses didn't cost STC too much, since the NCHC is typically regarded as the best conference in college hockey (St. Cloud only fell two spots).

St. Cloud went through a bit of a rough patch in February, splitting series against two teams with losing records, and found themselves in a race for second place with UMD. The two ended the regular season with a home-and-home series over two weekends and when the Bulldogs took the first game they were just one point behind St. Cloud in the standings. The Huskies jumped out to a huge lead in their final regular season game, leading 3–0 after 20 minutes, but Duluth fought back in the final two periods to tie the game. Not wanting to let Duluth have a chance, Easton Brodzinski scored the winning goal just 17 seconds into overtime, giving the Huskies the second seed.

=== NCHC Tournament ===
With the entire conference tournament being played at the Ralph Engelstad Arena, there was no home advantage for the Huskies, but the team was able to avoid playing Western Michigan in the quarterfinals (WMU had won the season series 2–4). Instead, St. Cloud was nearly overcome by a tremendous performance by Colorado College's Matt Vernon. STC outshout CC 44–7 in the game but still found themselves down as the second period wound down. Vernon only allowed two goals while his team was completely outplayed and St. Cloud never took the pressure off. The Tigers couldn't even get a shot on goal in the third and the Huskies' oppressive defense carried them to the victory. In the semifinal, St. Cloud met Minnesota Duluth for the seventh time that season. The two teams fought a mostly even first period but STC carried a 2–1 lead. The Huskies dominated the middle frame, outshooting the Bulldogs 18–6, but the teams exchanged goals to leave St. Cloud with a 1-goal lead after 40 minutes. St. Cloud put up a defensive wall in the third and were able to hold UMD off of the scoresheet to win the game and head to the title match.

The Huskies were once again able to play well in the first two periods, leading 2–1 after one and then pushing the pace in the second. Unfortunately for St. Cloud, North Dakota possessed a far better offense than Duluth and when the Fighting Hawks got some power play opportunities in the third they took full advantage. UND scored three times in just over two minutes to take the lead and then added an empty-net goal to down the Huskies 5–3.

=== NCAA tournament ===
The second-place finish resulted in St. Cloud State being ranked 7th by the NCAA selection committee and the team received was set to face Boston University in the regional semifinals. The first period was marked by BU killing off a 5-minute major penalty and, when the Terriers opened the scoring 8 seconds into the second, it appeared that it may be their night. St. Cloud continued to pile shots on goal and were finally able to break through after the half-way point of the game. Once the Huskies broke through a wave of goals followed; four goals were scored in less than four minutes, three from St. Cloud State, and the Huskies found themselves up 3–2 entering the third. Chase Brand took a major penalty for elbowing Jay O'Brien in the head and gave BU a chance to get back into the game. Instead, Jami Krannila wound up scoring on a penalty shot less than a minute later and the goal from St. Cloud seemed to take the steam out of the Terriers. The penalty ended without another goal and Hrenák held BU scoreless in the third while the Huskies scored twice more to run away with a 6–2 win.

In their second game the Huskies met Boston College, who had been advanced due to the forced withdrawal of Notre Dame. despite coming in cold, BC scored first and led after one but, for the fifth consecutive game, St. Cloud was an absolute terror in the second period. The Huskies outshot Boston College 20–7 and reeled off three goals to take a commanding lead. The defense proved stout once again and held the Eagles scoreless over the final 45 minutes of the game to send St. Cloud State to their second Frozen Four since joining Division I in 1987. Unfortunately for St. Cloud, not everything had turned up roses. the team's leading goal scorer, Easton Brodzinski, broke his femur in the game and would miss the team's Frozen Four run.

==== Frozen Four ====
Two weeks later the Huskies opened the Frozen Four as one of three Minnesota teams and faced the highest-remaining seed, Minnesota State. After exchanging power play markers, St. Cloud took a 2–1 lead into the second period. The Huskies increased their lead to two less than three minutes into the middle frame, but this game saw the Huskies' script change. MSU came charging back in the second, more than doubling St. Cloud's shot total, and scored twice in the second half of the period to tie the game. The Mavericks then scored early in the third to take the lead and looked to have all the momentum, but St. Cloud was able to fight back. After tying the score with under 10 minutes to play, St. Cloud fought a mostly even duel with Minnesota State for the rest of the game but, with less than a minute to play, Nolan Walker deflected a point shot over the shoulder of Dryden McKay and put the Huskies ahead. They were able to hold off the Mavericks in the final few second and reached the program's first ever championship game.

In the title game, St. Cloud got off to a slow start against Massachusetts, recording only 3 shots in the first period. While the Huskies found themselves down by just a goal as the first neared its end, there was a bit of controversy when a UMass player grabbed the puck and threw it out of his defensive zone. On replay it appeared to be worth of a delay-of-game penalty but nothing was called. Shortly thereafter, the Minutemen scored their second goal of the game on what was likely an offside play. Despite the referees reviewing the goal, it was allowed to stand and the St. Cloud team was livid. The Huskies were able to calm down during intermission and came out firing in the third. After getting their second power play opportunity, the team had a chance to climb back into the game. Instead, the Huskies were caught after a bad turnover and Philip Lagunov put UMass ahead by 3 after a highlight-reel goal. The short-handed marker left many of St. Cloud's players with slumped shoulders. Before the period was out the Minutemen scored again on their own power play and essentially put the game out of reach. While it can't be known what difference the missed calls in the first or the absence of Brodzinski made, Massachusetts was the better team throughout the game and St. Could would have to wait for another year.

Trevor Zins sat out the season.

== Departures ==
Player	Position	Nationality	Cause
Jack Ahcan	Defenseman	United States	Graduation (Signed with Boston Bruins)
Clark Kuster	Defenseman	United States	Graduation (Signed with Pensacola Ice Flyers)
Jack Poehling	Forward	United States	Graduation (Signed with Ontario Reign)
Nick Poehling	Forward	United States	Graduation (Signed with Ontario Reign)
Jake Wahlin	Forward	United States	Graduation (Signed with Rapid City Rush)

== Recruiting ==
Player	Position	Nationality	Age	Notes
Jared Cockrell	Forward	United States	25	Kent's Hill, ME; graduate transfer from Colgate
Seamus Donohue	Defenseman	United States	24	North Oaks, MN; transfer from Michigan Tech
Jack Johnston	Forward	United States	21	Saint Paul, MN
Veeti Miettinen	Forward	Finland	19	Espoo, FIN; selected 168th overall in 2020
Joey Molenaar	Defenseman	United States	20	Minnetonka, MN
Brady Ziemer	Goaltender	United States	20	Carver, MN

== Roster ==
As of March 1, 2021.

No.	Nat.	Player	Class	Pos	Height	Weight	DoB	Hometown	Previous team	NHL rights
2	(United States)	Brady Ziemer	Freshman	D	5' 10" (1.78 m)	180 lb (82 kg)	2000-05-24	Carver, Minnesota	Green Bay Gamblers (USHL)	—
3	(United States)	Seamus Donohue (A)	Senior	F	6' 0" (1.83 m)	190 lb (86 kg)	1996-06-01	North Oaks, Minnesota	Michigan Tech (WCHA)	—
5	(Czech Republic)	Ondřej Trejbal	Sophomore	D	6' 3" (1.91 m)	185 lb (84 kg)	1999-04-21	Hamry nad Sázavou, Czech Republic	Minnesota Wilderness (NAHL)	—
6	(United States)	Luke Jaycox (A)	Senior	D	6' 3" (1.91 m)	205 lb (93 kg)	1997-08-19	Warroad, Minnesota	Lincoln Stars (USHL)	—
7	(United States)	Jack Johnston	Freshman	F	5' 10" (1.78 m)	170 lb (77 kg)	1999-06-29	St. Paul, Minnesota	Fairbanks Ice Dogs (NAHL)	—
8	(Canada)	Tyler Anderson	Senior	D	6' 2" (1.88 m)	210 lb (95 kg)	1997-01-12	Winnipeg, Manitoba	Steinbach Pistons (MJHL)	—
9	(United States)	Spencer Meier (C)	Junior	D	6' 4" (1.93 m)	212 lb (96 kg)	1999-04-15	Sartell, Minnesota	Fargo Force (USHL)	—
10	(Canada)	Kyler Kupka	Junior	F	6' 0" (1.83 m)	185 lb (84 kg)	1999-05-11	Camrose, Alberta	Camrose Kodiaks (AJHL)	—
11	(United States)	Trevor Zins	Sophomore	D	6' 1" (1.85 m)	195 lb (88 kg)	1998-07-23	St. Michael, Minnesota	Trail Smoke Eaters (BCHL)	—
13	(Finland)	Jami Krannila	Sophomore	F	5' 10" (1.78 m)	165 lb (75 kg)	2000-10-03	Nokia, Finland	Sioux Falls Stampede (USHL)	—
14	(Canada)	Zach Okabe	Sophomore	F	5' 9" (1.75 m)	170 lb (77 kg)	2001-01-04	Okotoks, Alberta	Grande Prairie Storm (AJHL)	—
15	(United States)	Micah Miller	Junior	F	5' 9" (1.75 m)	200 lb (91 kg)	1998-10-29	Grand Rapids, Minnesota	Sioux City Musketeers (USHL)	—
16	(United States)	Will Hammer	Senior	F	6' 2" (1.88 m)	210 lb (95 kg)	1996-02-06	St. Cloud, Minnesota	Minnesota Magicians (NAHL)	—
17	(United States)	Thomas Rocco	Sophomore	F	5' 10" (1.78 m)	160 lb (73 kg)	1999-11-04	Midlothian, Virginia	Aberdeen Wings (NAHL)	—
18	(United States)	Brendan Bushy	Junior	D	6' 2" (1.88 m)	230 lb (104 kg)	1998-08-23	Thief River Falls, Minnesota	Dubuque Fighting Saints (USHL)	—
19	(United States)	Sam Hentges	Junior	F	6' 0" (1.83 m)	190 lb (86 kg)	1999-07-26	New Brighton, Minnesota	Tri-City Storm (USHL)	MIN, 210th overall 2018
20	(United States)	Nolan Walker	Junior	F	5' 10" (1.78 m)	170 lb (77 kg)	1998-10-20	Anchorage, Alaska	Sioux Falls Stampede (USHL)	—
21	(United States)	Jared Cockrell	Senior	F	5' 10" (1.78 m)	185 lb (84 kg)	1995-06-29	Kents Hill, Maine	Colgate (ECAC)	—
22	(United States)	Joe Molenaar	Freshman	F	6' 1" (1.85 m)	175 lb (79 kg)	1999-10-16	Minnetonka, Minnesota	Cedar Rapids RoughRiders (USHL)	—
25	(United States)	Nick Perbix	Junior	D	6' 4" (1.93 m)	200 lb (91 kg)	1998-06-15	Elk River, Minnesota	Omaha Lancers (USHL)	TBL, 169th overall 2017
26	(United States)	Easton Brodzinski	Senior	F	6' 2" (1.88 m)	198 lb (90 kg)	1996-08-13	Blaine, Minnesota	Green Bay Gamblers (USHL)	—
27	(United States)	Chase Brand	Sophomore	F	5' 10" (1.78 m)	165 lb (75 kg)	1999-02-25	Nevis, Minnesota	Madison Capitols (USHL)	—
28	(United States)	Kevin Fitzgerald (A)	Senior	F	6' 0" (1.83 m)	175 lb (79 kg)	1996-07-31	Hinsdale, Illinois	Aberdeen Wings (NAHL)	—
29	(Finland)	Veeti Miettinen	Freshman	F	5' 9" (1.75 m)	160 lb (73 kg)	2001-09-20	Espoo, Finland	Kiekko-Espoo (Nuorten SM-liiga)	TOR, 168th overall 2020
30	(United States)	Joey Lamoreaux	Sophomore	G	6' 1" (1.85 m)	180 lb (82 kg)	1999-02-01	Shorewood, Wisconsin	Madison Capitols (USHL)	—
34	(Slovakia)	Dávid Hrenák	Senior	G	6' 2" (1.88 m)	180 lb (82 kg)	1998-05-05	Považska Bystrica, Slovakia	Green Bay Gamblers (USHL)	LAK, 144th overall 2018
40	(United States)	Jaxon Castor	Sophomore	G	6' 3" (1.91 m)	200 lb (91 kg)	1997-03-14	Phoenix, Arizona	Shreveport Mudbugs (NAHL)	—

== Standings ==
2020–21 National Collegiate Hockey Conference Standings
	Conference record											Overall record					
	GP	W	L	T	OTW	OTL	3/SW	PTS	PT%	GF	GA	GP	W	L	T	GF	GA
#5 North Dakota †*	24	18	5	1	2	1	0	54	.750	94	47	29	22	6	1	114	57
#2 St. Cloud State	24	15	9	0	3	3	0	45	.625	78	64	31	20	11	0	101	84
#3 Minnesota Duluth	24	13	9	2	1	2	1	43	.597	72	54	28	15	11	2	84	66
#13 Omaha	24	14	9	1	4	0	1	40	.556	79	69	26	14	11	1	85	81
Denver	22	9	12	1	0	2	1	31	.470	61	60	24	11	13	1	67	66
Western Michigan	24	10	11	3	1	0	1	33	.458	73	84	25	10	12	3	77	89
Colorado College	22	4	16	2	0	2	2	18	.273	35	77	23	4	17	2	36	79
Miami	24	5	17	2	0	1	0	18	.250	46	83	25	5	18	2	48	89
Championship: March 16, 2021 † indicates conference regular season champion (Penrose Cup) * indicates conference tournament champion (Frozen Faceoff Championship Trophy); Rankings: USCHO.com Top 20 Poll

== Schedule and results ==
Date	Time	Opponent^{#}	Rank^{#}	Site	TV	Decision	Result	Attendance	Record
Regular season
December 1	7:30 PM	vs. #17 Western Michigan		Baxter Arena • Omaha, Nebraska		Hrenák	W 4–3	0	1–0–0 (1–0–0)
December 5	8:05 PM	vs. #4 Denver		Baxter Arena • Omaha, Nebraska	Altitude	Hrenák	W 4–3	0	2–0–0 (2–0–0)
December 6	8:05 PM	vs. Omaha		Baxter Arena • Omaha, Nebraska		Castor	W 5–3	0	3–0–0 (3–0–0)
December 9	3:35 PM	vs. Western Michigan	#13	Baxter Arena • Omaha, Nebraska		Hrenák	L 1–2	0	3–1–0 (3–1–0)
December 12	4:05 PM	vs. #1 North Dakota	#13	Baxter Arena • Omaha, Nebraska		Hrenák	W 5–3	0	4–1–0 (4–1–0)
December 13	8:05 PM	vs. #18 Omaha	#13	Baxter Arena • Omaha, Nebraska		Lamoreaux	L 0–2	0	4–2–0 (4–2–0)
December 16	7:35 PM	vs. #4 North Dakota	#9	Baxter Arena • Omaha, Nebraska		Hrenák	L 3–4 ^{OT}	0	4–3–0 (4–3–0)
December 18	7:35 PM	vs. Colorado College	#9	Baxter Arena • Omaha, Nebraska	AT&T RM	Castor	W 4–3 ^{OT}	0	5–3–0 (5–3–0)
December 20	4:05 PM	vs. #8 Denver	#9	Baxter Arena • Omaha, Nebraska	Altitude	Hrenák	W 3–1	0	6–3–0 (6–3–0)
January 2	6:00 PM	vs. #4 Minnesota Duluth	#6	Herb Brooks National Hockey Center • St. Cloud, Minnesota		Hrenák	L 3–4 ^{OT}	101	6–4–0 (6–4–0)
January 3	4:00 PM	vs. #4 Minnesota Duluth	#6	Herb Brooks National Hockey Center • St. Cloud, Minnesota		Hrenák	W 3–1	102	7–4–0 (7–4–0)
January 8	7:36 PM	at #5 Minnesota Duluth	#6	AMSOIL Arena • Duluth, Minnesota	CBSSN	Hrenák	W 4–3	0	8–4–0 (8–4–0)
January 9	6:00 PM	at #5 Minnesota Duluth	#6	AMSOIL Arena • Duluth, Minnesota		Hrenák	W 1–0 ^{OT}	0	9–4–0 (9–4–0)
January 15	6:05 PM	at Western Michigan	#4	Lawson Arena • Kalamazoo, Michigan		Hrenák	L 2–6	0	9–5–0 (9–5–0)
January 16	6:41 PM	at Western Michigan	#4	Lawson Arena • Kalamazoo, Michigan	CBSSN	Hrenák	L 1–3	0	9–6–0 (9–6–0)
January 22	7:30 PM	vs. Miami	#6	Herb Brooks National Hockey Center • St. Cloud, Minnesota		Castor	W 3–2	86	10–6–0 (10–6–0)
January 23	7:00 PM	vs. Miami	#6	Herb Brooks National Hockey Center • St. Cloud, Minnesota		Hrenák	W 8–2	110	11–6–0 (11–6–0)
February 5	7:30 PM	vs. Western Michigan	#4	Herb Brooks National Hockey Center • St. Cloud, Minnesota		Hrenák	W 5–1	153	12–6–0 (12–6–0)
February 6	6:07 PM	vs. Western Michigan	#4	Herb Brooks National Hockey Center • St. Cloud, Minnesota		Hrenák	L 4–5 ^{OT}	157	12–7–0 (12–7–0)
February 12	6:00 PM	at Miami	#6	Steve Cady Arena • Oxford, Ohio		Hrenák	L 2–3	0	12–8–0 (12–8–0)
February 13	4:05 PM	at Miami	#6	Steve Cady Arena • Oxford, Ohio		Hrenák	W 4–2	0	13–8–0 (13–8–0)
February 20	12:00 PM	vs. Colorado College	#6	Herb Brooks National Hockey Center • St. Cloud, Minnesota		Hrenák	W 4–0	143	14–8–0 (14–8–0)
February 27	7:07 PM	at #10 Minnesota Duluth	#6	AMSOIL Arena • Duluth, Minnesota	CBSSN	Hrenák	L 1–5	250	14–9–0 (14–9–0)
March 6	1:00 PM	vs. #9 Minnesota Duluth	#8	Herb Brooks National Hockey Center • St. Cloud, Minnesota		Hrenák	W 4–3 ^{OT}	201	15–9–0 (15–9–0)
NCHC Tournament
March 12	2:30 PM	vs. Colorado College*	#8	Ralph Engelstad Arena • Grand Forks, North Dakota		Hrenák	W 2–1	1,923	16–9–0
March 15	3:00 PM	vs. #9 Minnesota Duluth*	#8	Ralph Engelstad Arena • Grand Forks, North Dakota		Hrenák	W 3–2	1,957	17–9–0
March 16	7:30 PM	at #2 North Dakota*	#8	Ralph Engelstad Arena • Grand Forks, North Dakota		Hrenák	L 3–5	3,000	17–10–0
NCAA tournament
March 27	12:00 PM	vs. #10 Boston University*	#7	Times Union Center • Albany, New York (Regional semifinal)	ESPNews	Hrenák	W 6–2	1,136	18–10–0
March 28	4:30 PM	vs. #2 Boston College*	#7	Times Union Center • Albany, New York (Regional final)	ESPN2	Hrenák	W 4–1	1,136	19–10–0
April 8	4:00 PM	vs. #5 Minnesota State*	#7	PPG Paints Arena • Pittsburgh, Pennsylvania (National semifinal)	ESPN2	Hrenák	W 5–4	3,660	20–10–0
April 10	6:00 PM	vs. #6 Massachusetts*	#7	PPG Paints Arena • Pittsburgh, Pennsylvania (National Championship)	ESPN	Hrenák	L 0–5	3,963	20–11–0
*Non-conference game. ^{#}Rankings from USCHO.com Poll. All times are in Central Time.

== Scoring statistics ==
Name	Position	Games	Goals	Assists	Points	PIM
Veeti Miettinen	RW	31	11	13	24	0
Nolan Walker	C	31	10	14	24	8
Jami Krannila	F	31	11	12	23	18
Nick Perbix	D	31	7	16	23	16
Zach Okabe	RW	30	6	16	22	12
Easton Brodzinski	RW	29	13	5	18	46
Kevin Fitzgerald	C	31	9	9	18	22
Sam Hentges	C	29	8	9	17	14
Spencer Meier	D	31	4	11	15	6
Micah Miller	C/RW	31	3	7	10	14
Ondřej Trejbal	D	29	1	9	10	10
Will Hammer	F	31	3	6	9	6
Brendan Bushy	D	31	1	8	9	27
Seamus Donohue	D	31	1	8	9	40
Chase Brand	C	27	4	4	8	21
Kyler Kupka	F	23	3	5	8	4
Jared Cockrell	F	30	3	4	7	12
Luke Jaycox	D	31	1	6	7	8
Joe Molenaar	F	13	1	3	4	2
Brady Ziemer	D	18	1	1	2	8
Dávid Hrenák	G	27	0	1	1	2
Thomas Rocco	F	2	0	0	0	2
Joey Lamoreaux	G	2	0	0	0	0
Jack Johnston	F	3	0	0	0	0
Jaxon Castor	G	5	0	0	0	0
Tyler Anderson	D	15	0	0	0	2
Bench	-	-	-	-	-	12
Total			101	167	268	312

== Goaltending statistics ==
Name	Games	Minutes	Wins	Losses	Ties	Goals against	Saves	Shut outs	SV %	GAA
Jaxon Castor	5	205	3	0	0	6	64	0	.914	1.75
Dávid Hrenák	27	1579	17	10	0	70	661	2	.904	2.66
Joey Lamoreaux	2	69	0	1	0	5	21	0	.808	4.35
Empty Net	-	15	-	-	-	3	-	-	-	-
Total	31	1868	20	11	0	84	746	2	.899	2.70

== Rankings ==
Poll	Week																					
Poll	Pre	1	2	3	4	5	6	7	8	9	10	11	12	13	14	15	16	17	18	19	20	21 (Final)
USCHO.com	NR	NR	NR	NR	13	9	6	6	6	4	6	5	4	6	6	6	8	8	8	7	-	2
USA Today	NR	NR	NR	NR	11	9	6	6	7	5	6	5	5	7	7	6	8	6	8	7	3	2

USCHO did not release a poll in week 20.

== Awards and honors ==
Player	Award	Ref
Nolan Walker	NCAA All-Tournament Team	
Veeti Miettinen	NCHC Rookie of the Year	
Kevin Fitzgerald	NCHC Sportsmanship Award	
Nick Perbix	NCHC Second Team	
Veeti Miettinen	NCHC Second Team	
Veeti Miettinen	NCHC Rookie Team	
Nick Perbix	Frozen Faceoff All-Tournament Team	

== Players drafted into the NHL ==
=== 2021 NHL entry draft ===
Round	Pick	Player	NHL team
2	54	Jack Peart^{†}	Minnesota Wild

† incoming freshman
