= 2020–21 NCHC season =

- Season: 2020–21
- Conference: NCHC
- Division: Division I
- Sport: ice hockey
- Duration: December 1, 2020– April 10, 2021
- Number of teams: 8

2021 NHL Entry Draft
- Top draft pick: Connor Kelley
- Picked by: Chicago Blackhawks

Regular Season
- Season champions: North Dakota
- Season MVP: Shane Pinto
- Top scorer: Jordan Kawaguchi

NCHC Tournament
- Tournament champions: North Dakota
- Runners-up: St. Cloud State
- Tournament MVP: Riese Gaber
- Top scorer: Collin Adams; Jordan Kawaguchi

NCAA tournament
- Bids: 4
- Record: 5–4
- Best Finish: Runner-Up
- Team(s): St. Cloud State

The 2020–21 NCHC season was the 8th season of play for National Collegiate Hockey Conference and took place during the 2020–21 NCAA Division I men's ice hockey season. The start of the season was delayed until December 1, 2020 and concluded on April 10, 2021. St. Cloud State made its first championship appearance, finishing as the national runner-up.

== Season ==
Due to the ongoing COVID-19 pandemic, all NCHC teams scrapped their non-conference schedules. The league ended up delaying the start to the season until the beginning of December, 2 months later than usual. All eight member teams began the year playing at the Baxter Arena in Omaha, Nebraska. All games in the month of December were set at the Mavericks' home arena and the pattern for the remainder of the season was set. North Dakota and Minnesota Duluth lived up to their preseason billing while Denver and Western Michigan both eventually fell from the rankings. The later two were quickly replaced by St. Cloud State and Omaha. From the time the clubs returned home in January to the end of the season, very little movement was seen as far as their national rankings.

By the time the conference tournament began, the NCHC was all but guaranteed to receive 4 bids to the NCAA tournament. Even after Omaha was upset in the quarterfinals by Denver, they only fell from 12 to 14 and did end up with one of the final at-large bids. North Dakota, the #1 team for much of the season, received the top overall seed after winning the conference title and opened NCAA play against #16 American International. They did not, however, have the easiest path into the quarterfinals as Duluth ended up getting advanced due to a withdrawal by Michigan.

The NCHC proved to be the strongest conference by having the most teams in every round of the NCAA tournament. One of the biggest games, outside of the championship, was the quarterfinal match between North Dakota and Minnesota Duluth that set a new NCAA record for the longest game in tournament history. The match required 5 extra periods and went on so long that UMD starting goaltender Zach Stejskal had to be replaced due to cramping. The Bulldogs did eventually win the game on a goal by Freshman Luke Mylymok and make their 4th consecutive Frozen Four. While St. Cloud State had a chance to extend the conference's championship run to five, they were defeated in the final by Massachusetts.

== Standings ==
2020–21 National Collegiate Hockey Conference Standings
| | Conference record | | | | | | | | | | | Overall record | | | | | |
| | GP | W | L | T | OTW | OTL | 3/SW | PTS | PT% | GF | GA | GP | W | L | T | GF | GA |
|---|---|---|---|---|---|---|---|---|---|---|---|---|---|---|---|---|---|
| #5 North Dakota †* | 24 | 18 | 5 | 1 | 2 | 1 | 0 | 54 | .750 | 94 | 47 | 29 | 22 | 6 | 1 | 114 | 57 |
| #2 St. Cloud State | 24 | 15 | 9 | 0 | 3 | 3 | 0 | 45 | .625 | 78 | 64 | 31 | 20 | 11 | 0 | 101 | 84 |
| #3 Minnesota Duluth | 24 | 13 | 9 | 2 | 1 | 2 | 1 | 43 | .597 | 72 | 54 | 28 | 15 | 11 | 2 | 84 | 66 |
| #13 Omaha | 24 | 14 | 9 | 1 | 4 | 0 | 1 | 40 | .556 | 79 | 69 | 26 | 14 | 11 | 1 | 85 | 81 |
| Denver | 22 | 9 | 12 | 1 | 0 | 2 | 1 | 31 | .470 | 61 | 60 | 24 | 11 | 13 | 1 | 67 | 66 |
| Western Michigan | 24 | 10 | 11 | 3 | 1 | 0 | 1 | 33 | .458 | 73 | 84 | 25 | 10 | 12 | 3 | 77 | 89 |
| Colorado College | 22 | 4 | 16 | 2 | 0 | 2 | 2 | 18 | .273 | 35 | 77 | 23 | 4 | 17 | 2 | 36 | 79 |
| Miami | 24 | 5 | 17 | 2 | 0 | 1 | 0 | 18 | .250 | 46 | 83 | 25 | 5 | 18 | 2 | 48 | 89 |
Championship: March 16, 2021 † indicates conference regular season champion (Penrose Cup) * indicates conference tournament champion (Frozen Faceoff Championship Trophy); Rankings: USCHO.com Top 20 Poll

== Coaches ==
Entering the season, Scott Sandelin needed 9 more wins to become 45th coach in NCAA history to record 400 victories for a career.

=== Records ===
| Team | Head coach | Season at school | Record at school | NCHC record |
|---|---|---|---|---|
| Colorado College | Mike Haviland | 7 | 63–136–20 | 31–95–19 |
| Denver | David Carle | 3 | 45–21–11 | 22–19–8 |
| Miami | Chris Bergeron | 2 | 8–21–5 | 5–16–3 |
| Minnesota Duluth | Scott Sandelin | 21 | 391–321–89 | 94–60–15 |
| North Dakota | Brad Berry | 6 | 116–57–23 | 67–41–13 |
| Omaha | Mike Gabinet | 4 | 40–58–8 | 23–43–6 |
| St. Cloud State | Brett Larson | 3 | 43–21–9 | 29–32–5 |
| Western Michigan | Andy Murray | 10 | 157–144–40 | 70–83–15 |

== Conference tournament ==
Quarterfinals; March 12–13
1 | North Dakota | 6
8 | Miami | 2
2 | St. Cloud State | 2
7 | Colorado College | 1
3 | Minnesota-Duluth | 5*
6 | Western Michigan | 4
4 | Omaha | 4
5 | Denver | 5

Semifinals; March 15
1 | North Dakota | 2*
5 | Denver | 1
2 | St. Cloud State | 3
3 | Minnesota-Duluth | 2

Championship; March 16
1 | North Dakota | 5
2 | St. Cloud State | 3

* denotes overtime periods

== NCAA tournament ==
=== Regional semifinals ===
==== Midwest ====
| March 26, 2021; 7:30 PM | (1) North Dakota | 5 – 1 (4–0, 0–0, 1–1) | (4) American International | Scheels Arena, Fargo, North Dakota; Attendance: 1,435 |

Game reference

Adam Scheel
Goalies
Stefano Durante (20 min)
Jake Kucharski (40 min)
Referees:
Bobby Lukkason
Brady Johnson
Linesmen:
Tyler Landman
Nathan Voll

| (Bernard-Docker, Sanderson) Jasper Weatherby (13) – 08:58 | 1–0 |
| (unassisted) Jasper Weatherby (14) – GW – 11:54 | 2–0 |
| (Kleven, Caulfield) Grant Mismash (10) – 14:16 | 3–0 |
| (Gaber, Bast) Collin Adams (12) – 16:22 | 4–0 |
| | 4–1 | 57:46 – Tobias Fladeby (10) (Theodore, Callahan) |
| (Kawaguchi) Collin Adams (13) – 58:08 | 5–1 |

12 min
Penalties
12 min
33
Shots
25

After seeding, Michigan, Minnesota Duluth's opponent in the first round, was forced to withdraw due to COVID-19 positive tests. UMD was automatically advanced to the second round by a no-contest decision.

==== West ====
| March 27, 2021; 8:00 PM | (1) Minnesota | 7 – 2 (3–1, 3–0, 1–1) | (4) Omaha | Budweiser Events Center, Loveland, Colorado; Attendance: 125 |

Game reference

Jack LaFontaine
Goalies
Isaiah Saville (27:13)
Austin Roden (32:47)
Referees:
Scott Hansen
Holton Walker
Linesmen:
Kevin Briganti
Kyle Richetelle

| (Munson, Faber) Mason Nevers (1) – 05:48 | 1–0 |
| (Faber, Johnson) Jack Perbix (4) – 15:35 | 2–0 |
| (McLaughlin, Walker) Scott Reedy (11) – GW – 17:36 | 3–0 |
| | 3–1 | 18:04 – Taylor Ward (12) (Weiss, Scanlin) |
| (Faber, Meyers) Ryan Johnson (2) – 20:41 | 4–1 |
| (LaCombe, Brodzinski) Ben Meyers (12) – 27:13 | 5–1 |
| (Ranta, Faber) Mason Nevers (2) – 36:13 | 6–1 |
| | 6–2 | 43:05 – Taylor Ward (13) (Weiss, Proctor) |
| (Nelson, Faber) Sampo Ranta (19) – 44:17 | 7–2 |

2 min
Penalties
4 min
30
Shots
28

==== Northeast ====
| March 27, 2021; 1:00 PM | (2) St. Cloud State | 6 – 2 (0–0, 3–2, 3–0) | (3) Boston University | Times Union Center, Albany, New York; Attendance: 1,136 |

Game reference

Dávid Hrenák
Goalies
Drew Commesso
Referees:
Colin Kronfrost
Brett DesRosiers
Linesmen:
Sam Shikowsky
Nick Bradshaw

| | 0–1 | 20:08 – Wilmer Skoog (4) (Cockerill) |
| (Walker, Trejbal) Micah Miller (2) – 32:14 | 1–1 |
| (Hammer, Kupka) Nick Perbix (7) – 33:29 | 2–1 |
| | 2–2 | 35:28 – PP – Jake Wise (9) (Tuch) |
| (Walker) Easton Brodzinski (12) – GW – 36:00 | 3–2 |
| (unassisted) Jami Krannila (11) – SH PS – 44:17 | 4–2 |
| (Walker) Easton Brodzinski (13) – 50:04 | 5–2 |
| (Bushy, Krannila) Veeti Miettinen (11) – 55:02 | 6–2 |

23 min
Penalties
21 min
38
Shots
36

=== Regional finals ===
==== West ====
| March 27, 2021; 6:30 PM | (1) North Dakota | 2 – 3 (5OT) (0–0, 0–0, 2–2, 0–0, 0–0, 0–0, 0–0, 0–1) | (3) Minnesota–Duluth | Scheels Arena, Fargo, North Dakota; Attendance: 1,494 |

Game reference

Adam Scheel
Goalies
Zach Stejskal (124:37)
Ryan Fanti (17:36)
Referees:
Joe Carusoe
C. J. Hanafin
Linesmen:
Ryan Knapp
Brian Oliver

| | 0–1 | 43:21 – Jackson Cates (11) (Lellig, Bender) |
| | 0–2 | 44:41 – Cole Koepke (14) (unassisted) |
| (Weatherby, Pinto) Collin Adams (14) – EA – 58:19 | 1–2 |
| (Pinto, Kiersted) Jordan Kawaguchi (10) – EA – 59:03 | 2–2 |
| | 2–3 | 142:13 – GW – Luke Mylymok (2) (unassisted) |

6 min
Penalties
6 min
65
Shots
54

==== Northeast ====
| March 28, 2021; 5:30 | (1) Boston College | 1 – 4 (1–0, 0–3, 0–1) | (2) St. Cloud State | Times Union Center, Albany, New York; Attendance: 1,136 |

Game reference

Spencer Knight
Goalies
Dávid Hrenák
Referees:
Ryan Sweeney
Mike Schubert
Linesmen:
Joe Sherman
Anthony Valley

| (Newhook, Hardman) Matt Boldy (11) – 14:23 | 1–0 |
| | 1–1 | 29:21 – Luke Jaycox (1) (Okabe, Krannila) |
| | 1–2 | 35:15 – GW – Will Hammer (2) (Perbix, Cockrell) |
| | 1–3 | 39:15 – Nolan Walker (9) (Perbix) |
| | 1–4 | 59:15 – EN – Micah Miller (3) (Bushy) |

2 min
Penalties
4 min
27
Shots
36

=== Frozen Four ===
| April 8, 2021; 5:00 PM | (W2) Minnesota State | 4 – 5 (1–2, 2–1, 1–2) | (NE2) St. Cloud State | PPG Paints Arena, Pittsburgh, Pennsylvania; Attendance: 3,660 |

Game reference

Dryden McKay
Goalies
Dávid Hrenák
Referees:
Peter Schlittenhardt
Jeremy Tufts
Linesmen:
Nicholas Briganti
William Kingdon

| | 0–1 | 03:18 – PP – Spencer Meier (4) (Okabe, Fitzgerald) |
| (Hirose, Napravnik) Nathan Smith (8) – PP – 16:09 | 1–1 |
| | 1–2 | 16:19 – Kyler Kupka (3) (Walker, Hentges) |
| | 1–3 | 22:40 – Will Hammer (3) (unassisted) |
| (Gerads, Carroll) Walker Duehr (10) – 32:07 | 2–3 |
| (Morton, Hirose) Nathan Smith (9) – PP – 34:24 | 3–3 |
| (Duehr) Dallas Gerads (9) – 44:18 | 4–3 |
| | 4–4 | 50:14 – Joe Molenaar (1) (Hammer, Meier) |
| | 4–5 | 59:06 – GW – Nolan Walker (4) (Donohue, Kupka) |

2 min
Penalties
4 min
29
Shots
22

| April 8, 2021; 9:00 PM | (E2) Massachusetts | 3 – 2 (OT) (1–1, 0–1, 1–0, 1–0) | (MW3) Minnesota Duluth | PPG Paints Arena, Pittsburgh, Pennsylvania; Attendance: 3,660 |

Game reference

Matt Murray
Goalies
Zach Stejskal
Referees:
Brett DesRosiers
Brett Sheva
Linesmen:
Justin Cornell
Pat Richardson

| (Kessel, Chau) Zac Jones (9) – PP – 15:33 | 1–0 |
| | 1–1 | 17:50 – Tanner Laderoute (3) (Olson, Kelley) |
| | 1–2 | 31:01 – Cole Koepke (15) (Cates, Swaney) |
| (Lopina, Trivigno) Anthony Del Gaizo (2) – 48:25 | 2–2 |
| (Trivigno, Lopina) Garrett Wait (9) – GW – 74:30 | 3–2 |

2 min
Penalties
4 min
28
Shots
38

=== National Championship ===
| April 10, 2021; 7:00 PM | (E2) Massachusetts | 5 – 0 | (NE2) St. Cloud State | PPG Paints Arena, Pittsburgh, Pennsylvania; Attendance: 3,963 |

Game reference

Scoring summary
| Period | Team | Goal | Assist(s) | Time | Score |
|---|---|---|---|---|---|
| 1st | UMA | Aaron Bohlinger (1) – GW | Sullivan and Farmer | 7:26 | 1–0 UMA |
| 1st | UMA | Reed Lebster (2) | Kiefiuk | 18:56 | 2–0 UMA |
| 2nd | UMA | Philip Lagunov (6) – SH | unassisted | 25:10 | 3–0 UMA |
| 2nd | UMA | Matthew Kessel (10) – PP | Chau and Gaudet | 33:45 | 4–0 UMA |
| 3rd | UMA | Bobby Trivigno (11) | Lebster | 46:00 | 5–0 UMA |
Penalty summary
| Period | Team | Player | Penalty | Time | PIM |
| 1st | UMA | Anthony Del Gaizo | Slashing | 15:27 | 2:00 |
| 2nd | STC | Seamus Donohue | Tripping | 20:24 | 2:00 |
| 2nd | UMA | Ryan Sullivan | Tripping | 23:57 | 2:00 |
| 2nd | UMA | Jake Gaudet | Elbowing | 30:31 | 2:00 |
| 2nd | STC | Bench (served by Zach Okabe) | Too Many Men | 32:35 | 2:00 |
| 3rd | None | | | | |

Shots by period
| Team | 1 | 2 | 3 | T |
|---|---|---|---|---|
| St. Cloud State | 3 | 12 | 10 | 25 |
| Massachusetts | 7 | 6 | 9 | 22 |

Goaltenders
| Team | Name | Saves | Goals against | Time on ice |
|---|---|---|---|---|
| STC | Dávid Hrenák | 17 | 5 | 60:00 |
| UMA | Filip Lindberg | 25 | 0 | 60:00 |

== Statistics ==
=== Leading scorers ===
GP = Games played; G = Goals; A = Assists; Pts = Points; PIM = Penalties in minutes

| Player | Class | Team | GP | G | A | Pts | PIM |
|---|---|---|---|---|---|---|---|
| Shane Pinto | Sophomore | North Dakota | 23 | 15 | 13 | 28 | 2 |
| Nick Swaney | Senior | Minnesota Duluth | 24 | 13 | 14 | 27 | 10 |
| Jordan Kawaguchi | Senior | North Dakota | 23 | 7 | 20 | 27 | 24 |
| Collin Adams | Senior | North Dakota | 24 | 9 | 15 | 24 | 8 |
| Jackson Cates | Junior | Minnesota Duluth | 24 | 10 | 13 | 23 | 4 |
| Chayse Primeau | Junior | Omaha | 24 | 9 | 14 | 23 | 2 |
| Veeti Miettinen | Freshman | St. Cloud State | 24 | 10 | 12 | 22 | 0 |
| Ronnie Attard | Sophomore | Western Michigan | 24 | 8 | 14 | 22 | 8 |
| Drew Worrad | Junior | Western Michigan | 24 | 5 | 17 | 22 | 6 |
| Carter Savoie | Freshman | Denver | 22 | 12 | 8 | 20 | 23 |
| Tyler Weiss | Junior | Omaha | 24 | 6 | 14 | 20 | 34 |

=== Leading goaltenders ===
Minimum 1/3 of team's minutes played in conference games.
GP = Games played; Min = Minutes played; W = Wins; L = Losses; T = Ties; GA = Goals against; SO = Shutouts; SV% = Save percentage; GAA = Goals against average

| Player | Class | Team | GP | Min | W | L | T | GA | SO | SV% | GAA |
|---|---|---|---|---|---|---|---|---|---|---|---|
| Adam Scheel | Junior | North Dakota | 21 | 1202 | 16 | 3 | 1 | 36 | 4 | .928 | 1.80 |
| Ryan Fanti | Sophomore | Minnesota Duluth | 17 | 1027 | 9 | 6 | 2 | 39 | 0 | .906 | 2.28 |
| Ludvig Persson | Freshman | Miami | 17 | 926 | 5 | 9 | 2 | 37 | 2 | .930 | 2.40 |
| Magnus Chrona | Sophomore | Denver | 16 | 915 | 6 | 10 | 0 | 37 | 1 | .908 | 2.43 |
| Dávid Hrenák | Senior | St. Cloud State | 20 | 1161 | 12 | 8 | 0 | 51 | 2 | .907 | 2.63 |

== Ranking ==
=== USCHO ===
| Team | Pre | 1 | 2 | 3 | 4 | 5 | 6 | 7 | 8 | 9 | 10 | 11 | 12 | 13 | 14 | 15 | 16 | 17 | 18 | 19 | 20 | Final |
|---|---|---|---|---|---|---|---|---|---|---|---|---|---|---|---|---|---|---|---|---|---|---|
| Colorado College | NR | NR | NR | NR | NR | NR | NR | NR | NR | NR | NR | NR | NR | NR | NR | NR | NR | NR | NR | NR | N/A | NR |
| Denver | 5 | 4 | 5 | 4 | 9 | 8 | 14 | 16 | 17 | 18 | 19 | 20 | NR | NR | NR | NR | NR | NR | NR | NR | N/A | NR |
| Miami | NR | NR | NR | NR | NR | NR | NR | NR | NR | NR | NR | NR | NR | NR | NR | NR | NR | NR | NR | NR | N/A | NR |
| Minnesota Duluth | 3 | 3 | 3 | 3 | 3 | 3 | 4 | 4 | 5 | 7 | 7 | 6 | 5 | 4 | 8 | 10 | 9 | 9 | 9 | 9 | N/A | 3 |
| North Dakota | 1 | 1 | 1 | 1 | 1 | 4 | 3 | 3 | 3 | 2 | 3 | 2 | 3 | 2 | 2 | 2 | 1 | 2 | 2 | 1 | N/A | 5 |
| Omaha | NR | NR | NR | NR | 18 | 17 | 11 | 11 | 11 | 10 | 11 | 9 | 9 | 10 | 9 | 11 | 12 | 11 | 12 | 12 | N/A | 13 |
| St. Cloud State | NR | NR | NR | NR | 13 | 9 | 6 | 6 | 6 | 4 | 6 | 5 | 4 | 6 | 6 | 6 | 8 | 8 | 8 | 7 | N/A | 2 |
| Western Michigan | 18 | 17 | 17 | 17 | NR | NR | NR | NR | NR | NR | NR | NR | NR | NR | NR | NR | NR | NR | NR | NR | N/A | NR |

USCHO did not release a poll in week 20.

=== USA Today ===
| Team | Pre | 1 | 2 | 3 | 4 | 5 | 6 | 7 | 8 | 9 | 10 | 11 | 12 | 13 | 14 | 15 | 16 | 17 | 18 | 19 | 20 | Final |
|---|---|---|---|---|---|---|---|---|---|---|---|---|---|---|---|---|---|---|---|---|---|---|
| Colorado College | NR | NR | NR | NR | NR | NR | NR | NR | NR | NR | NR | NR | NR | NR | NR | NR | NR | NR | NR | NR | NR | NR |
| Denver | 4 | 5 | 6 | 4 | 8 | 7 | 12 | 14 | NR | NR | 15 | NR | NR | NR | NR | NR | NR | NR | NR | NR | NR | NR |
| Miami | NR | NR | NR | NR | NR | NR | NR | NR | NR | NR | NR | NR | NR | NR | NR | NR | NR | NR | NR | NR | NR | NR |
| Minnesota Duluth | 3 | 3 | 4 | 3 | 3 | 3 | 4 | 4 | 5 | 8 | 7 | 6 | 6 | 4 | 8 | 10 | 9 | 9 | 9 | 9 | 5 | 3 |
| North Dakota | 1 | 1 | 1 | 1 | 1 | 4 | 3 | 3 | 3 | 2 | 3 | 3 | 3 | 1 | 1 | 1 | 1 | 2 | 2 | 1 | 4 | 5 |
| Omaha | NR | NR | NR | NR | NR | NR | 14 | 11 | 11 | 9 | 11 | 9 | 10 | 10 | 10 | 12 | 12 | 12 | 13 | 12 | 14 | 14 |
| St. Cloud State | NR | NR | NR | NR | 11 | 9 | 6 | 6 | 7 | 5 | 6 | 5 | 5 | 7 | 7 | 6 | 8 | 6 | 8 | 7 | 3 | 2 |
| Western Michigan | NR | NR | NR | NR | NR | NR | NR | NR | NR | NR | NR | NR | NR | NR | NR | NR | NR | NR | NR | NR | NR | NR |

== Awards ==
=== NCAA ===
| Award | Recipient | |
|---|---|---|
| Lowes' Senior CLASS Award | Jordan Kawaguchi, North Dakota | |
AHCA All-American Teams
| West First Team | Pos | Team |
| Ronnie Attard | D | Western Michigan |
| Shane Pinto | F | North Dakota |
| West Second Team | Pos | Team |
| Matt Kiersted | D | North Dakota |
| Jordan Kawaguchi | F | North Dakota |

=== NCHC ===
| Award | | Recipient |
|---|---|---|
| Player of the Year | | Shane Pinto, North Dakota |
| Rookie of the Year | | Veeti Miettinen, St. Cloud State |
| Goaltender of the Year | | Adam Scheel, North Dakota |
| Forward of the Year | | Shane Pinto, North Dakota |
| Defensive Defenseman of the Year | | Jacob Bernard-Docker, North Dakota |
| Offensive Defenseman of the Year | | Ronnie Attard, Western Michigan |
| Defensive Forward of the Year | | Shane Pinto, North Dakota |
| Scholar-Athlete of the Year | | Kale Bennett, Western Michigan |
| Three Stars Award | | Ludvig Persson, Miami |
| Sportsmanship Award | | Kevin Fitzgerald, St. Cloud State |
| Herb Brooks Coach of the Year | | Brad Berry, North Dakota |
All-NCHC Teams
| First Team | Position | Second Team |
| Adam Scheel, North Dakota | G | Ludvig Persson, Miami |
| Matt Kiersted, North Dakota | D | Nick Perbix, St. Cloud State |
| Ronnie Attard, Western Michigan | D | Jacob Bernard-Docker, North Dakota |
| Shane Pinto, North Dakota | F | Veeti Miettinen, St. Cloud State |
| Jordan Kawaguchi, North Dakota | F | Chayse Primeau, Omaha |
| Nick Swaney, Minnesota Duluth | F | Noah Cates, Minnesota Duluth |
| Honorable Mention | Position | Rookie Team |
| Isaiah Saville, Omaha | G | Ludvig Persson, Miami |
| Brandon Scanlin, Omaha | D | Jake Sanderson, North Dakota |
| Wyatt Kaiser, Minnesota Duluth | D | Wyatt Kaiser, Minnesota Duluth |
| Collin Adams, North Dakota | F | Veeti Miettinen, St. Cloud State |
| Cole Koepke, Minnesota Duluth | F | Carter Savoie, Denver |
| Grant Cruikshank, Colorado College | F | Riese Gaber, North Dakota |
| Ethen Frank, Western Michigan | F | |

=== Conference tournament ===
Frozen Faceoff MVP
| Riese Gaber | | North Dakota |
Frozen Faceoff All-Tournament Team
| Player | Pos | Team |
| Adam Scheel | G | North Dakota |
| Nick Perbix | D | St. Cloud State |
| Jake Sanderson | D | North Dakota |
| Collin Adams | F | North Dakota |
| Gavin Hain | F | North Dakota |
| Riese Gaber | F | North Dakota |

=== NCAA tournament ===
All-Tournament Team
| Player | Pos | Team |
|---|---|---|
| Nolan Walker | F | St. Cloud State |

== 2021 NHL entry draft ==
| Round | Pick | Player | College | NHL team |
|---|---|---|---|---|
| 2 | 36 | Shai Buium^{†} | Denver | Detroit Red Wings |
| 2 | 54 | Jack Peart^{†} | St. Cloud State | Minnesota Wild |
| 2 | 61 | Sean Behrens^{†} | Denver | Colorado Avalanche |
| 3 | 70 | Carter Mazur^{†} | Denver | Detroit Red Wings |
| 3 | 80 | Brent Johnson^{†} | North Dakota | Washington Capitals |
| 4 | 109 | Jackson Blake^{†} | North Dakota | Carolina Hurricanes |
| 4 | 114 | Redmond Savage^{†} | Miami | Detroit Red Wings |
| 4 | 119 | Joaquim Lemay^{†} | Omaha | Washington Capitals |
| 4 | 125 | Cameron Berg^{†} | Omaha | New York Islanders |
| 6 | 182 | Nate Benoit^{†} | North Dakota | Minnesota Wild |
| 7 | 204 | Connor Kelley | Minnesota Duluth | Chicago Blackhawks |

† incoming freshman
