= 1978–79 Miami Redskins men's ice hockey season =

Mid–Central Collegiate Hockey Association Tournament, Champion
- Conference: 2nd MCCHA
- Home ice: Miami Ice Arena

Record
- Overall: 22–14–1
- Conference: 12–3–1
- Home: 15–4–0
- Road: 7–10–1
- Neutral: 0–0–0

Coaches and captains
- Head coach: Steve Cady
- Captain(s): Gary DeLonge; Paul Kinney; John Mallory

The 1978–79 Miami Redskins men's ice hockey team represented the Miami University in college ice hockey. In its inaugural varsity season the team was coached by Steve Cady and played at the newly opened Miami Ice Arena.

== Season ==
Miami's ice hockey program was promoted to varsity status in the summer of 1978. In their first season the Redskins remained in the Mid–Central Collegiate Hockey Association, a small collection of local club teams, mainly so it could field a full schedule. Miami was also able to schedule 10 games against Division I opponents that would take place throughout the season.

After an initial win over Cincinnati, Miami was beaten soundly in four consecutive games. The losses were against the top-tier squads which was a trend that would continue throughout the season. Miami finished the regular season with a very good 12–3–1 record in conference, but lost all 10 games against the D-I teams. Miami's up and down year came to an end with the MCCHA tournament, with the entire championship being played in its home arena. The Redskins took advantage of the opportunity and routed Eastern Michigan before shutting out Michigan–Dearborn to claim the championship.

As Miami continued to transition into a full Division I schedule, the team knew it had a long way to go before it could compete with the rest of the big programs.

== Roster ==
No.	Nat.	Player	Class	Pos	Height	Weight	DoB	Hometown	Previous team	NHL rights
1		Tom Brown	Junior	G						—
2		Dudley Fitzpatrick	Junior	D						—
3		Ken Johnson	Senior	D						—
4		Tom Smith	Senior	W						—
5		Dave McClintock	Freshman	D						—
6		Matt McIntyre	Senior	D						—
7		Pete Shipman	Junior	F						—
8		Mike VanSchaack	Sophomore	W						—
9		Gary DeLonge (C)	Senior	C	6' 0" (1.83 m)	181 lb (82 kg)	1955-04-14	Summit, New Jersey		—
10		John Malloy (C)	Junior	C						—
11		Tom Maletic	Junior	D						—
12		Brian Proctor	Senior	C						—
14		Rick Smith	Senior	C						—
15		Warren Williams	Junior	W						—
16		Dave Cooper	Senior	D						—
17		Mike Bradford	Junior	D						—
18		Vern Sketchley	Freshman	W	6' 0" (1.83 m)	194 lb (88 kg)	1957-07-06	Houston, British Columbia	Calgary Centennials (WCHL)	—
19		Chris Graves	Senior	C						—
20		Jim Harmer	Senior	C						—
21		Paul Kinney (C)	Junior	W						—
22		Andrew Sloan	Senior	D						—
24		Ron Madey	Senior	W						—
25		John Noble	Senior	W						—
26		Gregory Daniels	Senior	C						—
27		Bill Bok	Freshman	F						—
29		Jeff Wengler	Senior	G						—
30		Pat Burrows	Senior	G						—
35		Tom Braun	Senior	G						—

== Standings ==
1978–79 NCAA Division I Independent ice hockey standings
	Conference							Overall					
	GP	W	L	T	PTS	GF	GA	GP	W	L	T	GF	GA
Air Force	0	0	0	0	-	-	-	31	18	12	1	157	139
Miami	0	0	0	0	-	-	-	37	22	14	1	257	145

== Schedule ==
Date	Opponent^{#}	Rank^{#}	Site	Result	Record
Regular Season
October 20	vs. Cincinnati		Miami Ice Arena • Oxford, Ohio	W 15–2	1–0 (1–0)
October 27	at Bowling Green*		BGSU Ice Arena • Bowling Green, Ohio	L 0–15	1–1
October 28	vs. Bowling Green*		Miami Ice Arena • Oxford, Ohio	L 1–8	1–2
November 3	at Northern Michigan*		Lakeview Arena • Marquette, Michigan	L 2–13	1–3
November 4	at Northern Michigan*		Lakeview Arena • Marquette, Michigan	L 3–7	1–4
November 10	vs. Illinois–Chicago*		Miami Ice Arena • Oxford, Ohio	W 7–4	2–4
November 11	vs. Illinois–Chicago*		Miami Ice Arena • Oxford, Ohio	L 4–5	2–5
November 17	vs. Kent State		Miami Ice Arena • Oxford, Ohio	W 14–1	3–5 (2–0)
November 18	vs. Kent State		Miami Ice Arena • Oxford, Ohio	W 13–2	4–5 (3–0)
December 1	at Michigan–Dearborn		Dearborn, Michigan	T 5–5 ^{OT}	4–5–1 (3–0–1)
December 2	at Michigan–Dearborn		Dearborn, Michigan	L 3–4 ^{OT}	4–6–1 (3–1–1)
December 8	at Eastern Michigan		Ypsilanti, Michigan	W 9–4	5–6–1 (4–1–1)
December 9	at Eastern Michigan		Ypsilanti, Michigan	W 10–2	6–6–1 (5–1–1)
December 15	vs. Missouri*		Miami Ice Arena • Oxford, Ohio	W 11–2	7–6–1
December 16	vs. Missouri*		Miami Ice Arena • Oxford, Ohio	W 14–2	8–6–1
January 5	at Saint Louis*		St. Louis Arena • St. Louis, Missouri	L 2–8	8–7–1
January 6	at Saint Louis*		St. Louis Arena • St. Louis, Missouri	L 3–6	8–8–1
January 10	at Cincinnati		Cincinnati, Ohio	W 10–1	9–8–1 (6–1–1)
January 12	at Kent State		Kent State University Ice Arena • Kent, Ohio	L 4–6	9–9–1 (6–2–1)
January 13	at Kent State		Kent State University Ice Arena • Kent, Ohio	W 9–2	10–9–1 (7–2–1)
January 17	at Cincinnati		Cincinnati, Ohio	W 9–4	11–9–1 (8–2–1)
January 19	at Michigan–Dearborn		Miami Ice Arena • Oxford, Ohio	W 7–3	12–9–1 (9–2–1)
January 20	at Michigan–Dearborn		Miami Ice Arena • Oxford, Ohio	W 2–5	12–10–1 (9–3–1)
January 23	at Cincinnati*		Cincinnati, Ohio	W 9–0	13–10–1
January 26	at Western Michigan*		Lawson Arena • Kalamazoo, Michigan	L 2–4	13–11–1
January 27	at Western Michigan*		Lawson Arena • Kalamazoo, Michigan	L 2–6	13–12–1
January 31	vs. Cincinnati		Miami Ice Arena • Oxford, Ohio	W 18–2	14–12–1 (10–3–1)
February 2	at Illinois–Chicago*		Chicago, Illinois	W 3–1	15–12–1
February 3	at Illinois–Chicago*		Chicago, Illinois	W 5–4	16–12–1
February 10	vs. Duquesne*		Miami Ice Arena • Oxford, Ohio	W 14–0	17–12–1
February 14	vs. Saint Louis*		Miami Ice Arena • Oxford, Ohio	L 1–4	17–13–1
February 16	vs. Eastern Michigan		Miami Ice Arena • Oxford, Ohio	W 6–4	18–13–1 (11–3–1)
February 17	vs. Eastern Michigan		Miami Ice Arena • Oxford, Ohio	W 6–3	19–13–1 (12–3–1)
February 23	vs. Ohio State*		Miami Ice Arena • Oxford, Ohio	L 1–7	19–14–1
February 24	vs. Cincinnati*		Miami Ice Arena • Oxford, Ohio	W 18–2	20–14–1
MCCHA Tournament
February 26	vs. Eastern Michigan*		Miami Ice Arena • Oxford, Ohio (MCCHA Semifinal)	W 12–2	21–14–1
March 6	vs. Michigan–Dearborn*		Miami Ice Arena • Oxford, Ohio (MCCHA Championship)	W 5–0	22–14–1
*Non-conference game. ^{#}Rankings from USCHO.com Poll. Source:

== Roster and scoring statistics ==
Name	Position	Games	Goals	Assists	Pts	PIM
Gary Delonge	C	-	39	35	74	-
Pete Shipman	F	-	26	45	71	-
John Malloy	C	37	16	52	68	-
Bill Bok	F	-	32	34	66	-
Vern Sketchley	W	-	-	-	-	73
Paul Kinney	W	-	-	-	-	88
Dudley Fitzpatrick	D	-	-	-	-	88

== Players drafted by NHL Clubs ==
=== 1979 NHL entry draft ===
Miami did not have any players selected in the NHL Entry Draft.
