= Goggin Ice Arena =

Hockey rink in Oxford, Ohio

Lloyd Goggin Ice Arena
- The Goggin
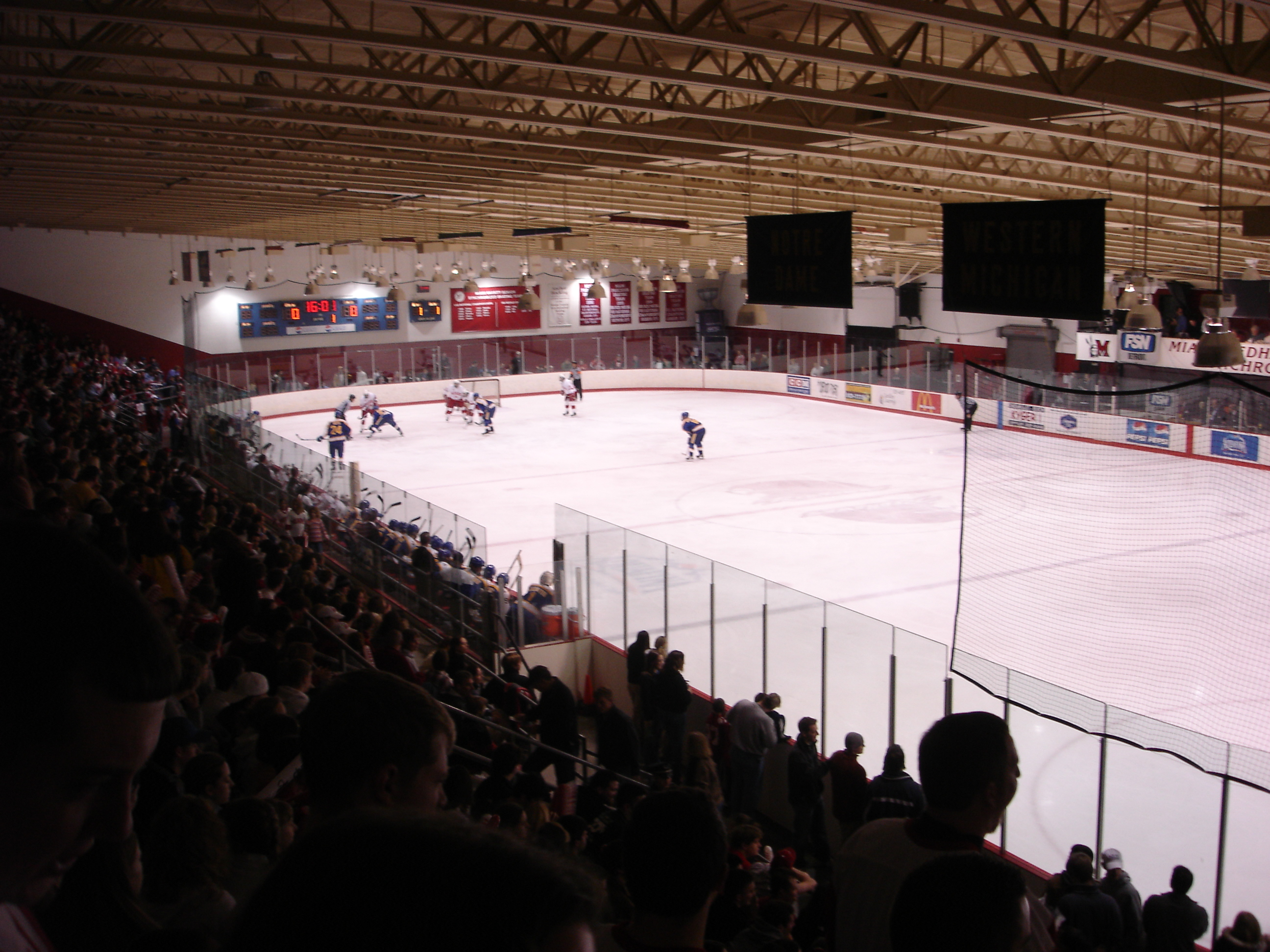
- Former names: Miami Ice Arena (1976-1984)
- Location: Miami University; Oxford, OH 45056
- Owner: Miami University
- Operator: Miami University
- Capacity: 2,850 (hockey)
- Surface: 200' x 85' (hockey); 125' x 50' (recreational)

Construction
- Opened: September, 1976
- Closed: July 2006
- Demolished: September 2006
- Cost: $2.7 million

Tenants
- Miami University RedHawks; NCAA Hockey synchronized skating Talawanda Hockey; Oxford Skating Club; Butler County Youth Hockey

Goggin Ice Arena was a 2,850-seat hockey rink in Oxford, Ohio. It was formerly home to the Miami University RedHawks ice hockey team. It was built in 1976, and renamed on October 11, 1984, in honor of Lloyd Goggin, former school vice president, who was instrumental in building the arena. The building also housed the school's synchronized skating program, club teams, local youth hockey, and the nation's largest summer hockey camp. Possibly the arena's most popular feature was a 3/4 recreational sheet of ice used primarily for public skating and intramural broomball games.

In 2006, the team moved into the new Goggin Ice Center.
