= 2020–21 Miami RedHawks men's ice hockey season =

- Conference: 8th NCHC
- Home ice: Steve Cady Arena

Rankings
- USCHO: NR
- USA Today: NR

Record
- Overall: 5–18–2
- Conference: 5–17–2–0–1–0
- Home: 1–5–1
- Road: 2–6–0
- Neutral: 2–7–1

Coaches and captains
- Head coach: Chris Bergeron
- Assistant coaches: Barry Schutte; Erid Rud
- Captain: Phil Knies
- Alternate captain(s): Derek Daschke; Casey Gilling

The 2020–21 Miami RedHawks men's ice hockey season was the 43rd season of play for the program and the 8th in the NCHC conference. The RedHawks represented Miami University and were coached by Chris Bergeron, in his 2nd season.

== Season ==
As a result of the ongoing COVID-19 pandemic the entire college ice hockey season was delayed. Because the NCAA had previously announced that all winter sports athletes would retain whatever eligibility they possessed through at least the following year, none of Miami's players would lose a season of play. However, the NCAA also approved a change in its transfer regulations that would allow players to transfer and play immediately rather than having to sit out a season, as the rules previously required.

Miami, along with several other NCHC teams, began the season in Omaha, Nebraska and played a sizable number of games in December. In an effort to create a pseudo-bubble and protect the teams from COVID-19, the RedHawks played 10 games over a three-week period. Miami began with a goalie rotation, having Ben Kraws and Ludvid Persson alternating starts, but by the end of the month, the team had settled on Persson as their starting netminder. At the beginning of January the team sat near the bottom of the conference, winning just two of those ten games. When play returned to home campus sites, there was a brief glimmer of hope for the RedHawks as the team won back-to-back games at Western Michigan but then the bottom dropped out. Miami played just three teams the rest of the regular season and ended up losing 10 of their final 12 games. Miami finished last in the NCHC and were easily bounced from the conference tournament. The only saving grace for the program was Persson's performance which could help the team moving forward.

== Departures ==
| Player | Position | Nationality | Cause |
|---|---|---|---|
| Karch Bachman | Forward | United States | Graduation (Signed with Charlotte Checkers) |
| Grant Frederic | Defenseman | United States | Graduation |
| Gordie Green | Forward | United States | Graduation (Signed with Toronto Marlies) |
| Brian Hawkinson | Forward | United States | Transferred to Colorado College |
| Carter Johnson | Forward | Canada | Graduation |
| Noah Jordan | Forward | Canada | Transferred to Vermont |
| Ryan Larkin | Goaltender | United States | Graduation |
| Christian Mohs | Forward | United States | Graduation |
| Chaz Switzer | Defenseman | United States | Graduation |

== Recruiting ==
| Player | Position | Nationality | Age | Notes |
|---|---|---|---|---|
| Matthew Barbolini | Forward | United States | 20 | Williamsville, NY |
| Joey Cassetti | Forward | United States | 21 | Pleasanton, CA; transfer from Merrimack |
| Robby Drazner | Defenseman | United States | 20 | Buffalo Grove, IL |
| Mike Holland | Forward | United States | 20 | Charlotte, NC |
| Dylan Moulton | Defenseman | United States | 19 | Nolensville, TN |
| Jack Olmstead | Forward | United States | 22 | Troy, MI; transfer from Michigan |
| Ludvig Persson | Goaltender | Sweden | 20 | Gothenburg, SWE |
| Hampus Rydqvist | Defenseman | Sweden | 21 | Gothenburg, SWE |
| Caleb Rule | Forward | United States | 21 | Lansing, MI; transfer from Providence |
| Brian Silver | Forward | United States | 19 | Lake Bluff, IL |

== Roster ==
As of March 1, 2021.

| No. | Nat. | Player | Class | Pos | Height | Weight | DoB | Hometown | Previous team | NHL rights |
|---|---|---|---|---|---|---|---|---|---|---|
| 3 | (Canada) | Bray Crowder | Junior | D | 6' 6" (1.98 m) | 210 lb (95 kg) | 1998-11-17 | Sudbury, Ontario | Muskegon (USHL) | — |
| 4 | (United States) | Andrew Sinard | Junior | D | 6' 6" (1.98 m) | 200 lb (91 kg) | 1997-05-22 | Brentwood, Tennessee | Aberdeen (NAHL) | — |
| 5 | (United States) | Jack Clement | Sophomore | D | 6' 4" (1.93 m) | 195 lb (88 kg) | 1999-06-09 | Detroit, Michigan | Des Moines (USHL) | — |
| 6 | (United States) | Alec Mahalak | Senior | D | 5' 9" (1.75 m) | 170 lb (77 kg) | 1998-09-14 | Monroe, Michigan | Youngstown (USHL) | — |
| 7 | (United States) | Robby Drazner | Freshman | D | 6' 1" (1.85 m) | 195 lb (88 kg) | 2000-02-13 | Buffalo Grove, Illinois | Nanaimo (BCHL) | — |
| 9 | (United States) | Jack Olmstead | Junior | D | 5' 10" (1.78 m) | 165 lb (75 kg) | 1998-02-06 | Troy, Michigan | Michigan (Big Ten) | — |
| 10 | (United States) | Ben Lown | Senior | F | 5' 7" (1.7 m) | 165 lb (75 kg) | 1998-06-22 | Newport Coast, California | Omaha (USHL) | — |
| 11 | (United States) | Rourke Russell | Senior | F | 6' 0" (1.83 m) | 175 lb (79 kg) | 1998-02-25 | Long Beach, California | Green Bay (USHL) | — |
| 12 | (United States) | John Sladic | Sophomore | F | 5' 8" (1.73 m) | 165 lb (75 kg) | 1998-01-22 | Novi, Michigan | Aberdeen (NAHL) | — |
| 13 | (United States) | Derek Daschke (A) | Junior | D | 6' 2" (1.88 m) | 195 lb (88 kg) | 1998-10-13 | Troy, Michigan | Chicago (USHL) | — |
| 16 | (Sweden) | Hampus Rydqvist | Freshman | D | 5' 10" (1.78 m) | 185 lb (84 kg) | 1999-03-12 | Gothenburg, Sweden | Maryland (NAHL) | — |
| 18 | (United States) | Monte Graham | Junior | F | 5' 11" (1.8 m) | 180 lb (82 kg) | 1998-04-04 | Hanover, Massachusetts | Muskegon (USHL) | — |
| 19 | (United States) | Caleb Rule | Freshman | F | 5' 11" (1.8 m) | 190 lb (86 kg) | 1999-02-15 | Lansing, Michigan | Providence (HEA) | — |
| 20 | (United States) | Michael Holland | Freshman | F | 6' 1" (1.85 m) | 190 lb (86 kg) | 1999-11-23 | Charlotte, North Carolina | Boston Jr. Bruins (NCDC) | — |
| 21 | (Canada) | Ryan Savage | Sophomore | F | 5' 11" (1.8 m) | 180 lb (82 kg) | 2000-03-31 | Montreal, Quebec | Muskegon (USHL) | — |
| 22 | (United States) | Joe Cassetti | Freshman | F | 6' 3" (1.91 m) | 205 lb (93 kg) | 1999-02-28 | Pleasanton, California | Waterloo (USHL) | — |
| 23 | (United States) | Brian Silver | Freshman | F | 5' 10" (1.78 m) | 180 lb (82 kg) | 2000-11-06 | Lake Bluff, Illinois | Omaha (USHL) | — |
| 25 | (United States) | Scott Corbett | Junior | F | 6' 1" (1.85 m) | 190 lb (86 kg) | 1998-04-14 | Carmel, Indiana | Dubuque (USHL) | — |
| 26 | (United States) | Matt Barry | Junior | F | 6' 0" (1.83 m) | 165 lb (75 kg) | 1997-09-01 | Naperville, Illinois | Holy Cross (AHA) | — |
| 27 | (United States) | Dylan Moulton | Freshman | D | 6' 0" (1.83 m) | 176 lb (80 kg) | 2001-04-24 | Nolensville, Tennessee | Green Bay (USHL) | — |
| 28 | (United States) | Chase Pletzke | Sophomore | F | 5' 11" (1.8 m) | 175 lb (79 kg) | 2000-04-10 | Bay City, Michigan | Langley (BCHL) | — |
| 29 | (United States) | Matthew Barbolini | Freshman | F | 6' 2" (1.88 m) | 190 lb (86 kg) | 2000-06-01 | Williamsville, New York | Lincoln (USHL) | — |
| 32 | (Sweden) | Ludvig Persson | Freshman | G | 6' 1" (1.85 m) | 184 lb (83 kg) | 1999-10-06 | Hindås, Sweden | Lone Star (NAHL) | — |
| 33 | (United States) | Ben Kraws | Sophomore | G | 6' 4" (1.93 m) | 180 lb (82 kg) | 2000-08-02 | Cranbury, New Jersey | Sioux City (USHL) | — |
| 34 | (Canada) | Alec Capstick | Sophomore | D | 6' 2" (1.88 m) | 200 lb (91 kg) | 1999-02-18 | Langley, British Columbia | Langley (BCHL) | — |
| 36 | (United States) | Grant Valentine | Senior | G | 5' 11" (1.8 m) | 175 lb (79 kg) | 1997-01-30 | Medina, Ohio | Wilkes-Barre/Scranton (NAHL) | — |
| 39 | (United States) | Casey Gilling (A) | Senior | F | 6' 0" (1.83 m) | 185 lb (84 kg) | 1998-03-25 | Gaylord, Michigan | Muskegon (USHL) | — |
| 67 | (United States) | Phil Knies (C) | Senior | F | 5' 9" (1.75 m) | 170 lb (77 kg) | 1998-06-04 | Phoenix, Arizona | Sioux City (USHL) | — |

== Standings ==
2020–21 National Collegiate Hockey Conference Standings
| | Conference record | | | | | | | | | | | Overall record | | | | | |
| | GP | W | L | T | OTW | OTL | 3/SW | PTS | PT% | GF | GA | GP | W | L | T | GF | GA |
|---|---|---|---|---|---|---|---|---|---|---|---|---|---|---|---|---|---|
| #5 North Dakota †* | 24 | 18 | 5 | 1 | 2 | 1 | 0 | 54 | .750 | 94 | 47 | 29 | 22 | 6 | 1 | 114 | 57 |
| #2 St. Cloud State | 24 | 15 | 9 | 0 | 3 | 3 | 0 | 45 | .625 | 78 | 64 | 31 | 20 | 11 | 0 | 101 | 84 |
| #3 Minnesota Duluth | 24 | 13 | 9 | 2 | 1 | 2 | 1 | 43 | .597 | 72 | 54 | 28 | 15 | 11 | 2 | 84 | 66 |
| #13 Omaha | 24 | 14 | 9 | 1 | 4 | 0 | 1 | 40 | .556 | 79 | 69 | 26 | 14 | 11 | 1 | 85 | 81 |
| Denver | 22 | 9 | 12 | 1 | 0 | 2 | 1 | 31 | .470 | 61 | 60 | 24 | 11 | 13 | 1 | 67 | 66 |
| Western Michigan | 24 | 10 | 11 | 3 | 1 | 0 | 1 | 33 | .458 | 73 | 84 | 25 | 10 | 12 | 3 | 77 | 89 |
| Colorado College | 22 | 4 | 16 | 2 | 0 | 2 | 2 | 18 | .273 | 35 | 77 | 23 | 4 | 17 | 2 | 36 | 79 |
| Miami | 24 | 5 | 17 | 2 | 0 | 1 | 0 | 18 | .250 | 46 | 83 | 25 | 5 | 18 | 2 | 48 | 89 |
Championship: March 16, 2021 † indicates conference regular season champion (Penrose Cup) * indicates conference tournament champion (Frozen Faceoff Championship Trophy); Rankings: USCHO.com Top 20 Poll

== Schedule and results ==
| Date | Time | Opponent^{#} | Rank^{#} | Site | TV | Decision | Result | Attendance | Record |
Regular season
| December 2 | 4:35 PM | vs. #1 North Dakota | | Baxter Arena • Omaha, Nebraska | | Kraws | L 0–2 | 0 | 0–1–0 (0–1–0) |
| December 5 | 5:05 PM | vs. Omaha | | Baxter Arena • Omaha, Nebraska | | Persson | L 1–2 ^{OT} | 0 | 0–2–0 (0–2–0) |
| December 6 | 5:05 PM | vs. #3 Minnesota Duluth | | Baxter Arena • Omaha, Nebraska | | Kraws | L 3–5 | 0 | 0–3–0 (0–3–0) |
| December 8 | 8:35 PM | vs. #3 Minnesota Duluth | | Baxter Arena • Omaha, Nebraska | | Persson | L 2–4 | 0 | 0–4–0 (0–4–0) |
| December 10 | 4:35 PM | vs. #9 Denver | | Baxter Arena • Omaha, Nebraska | Altitude | Kraws | L 1–5 | 0 | 0–5–0 (0–5–0) |
| December 12 | 9:05 PM | vs. #18 Omaha | | Baxter Arena • Omaha, Nebraska | | Persson | W 1–0 | 0 | 1–5–0 (1–5–0) |
| December 15 | 8:35 PM | vs. Colorado College | | Baxter Arena • Omaha, Nebraska | AT&T RM | Kraws | L 1–4 | 0 | 1–6–0 (1–6–0) |
| December 17 | 8:35 PM | vs. #8 Denver | | Baxter Arena • Omaha, Nebraska | Altitude | Persson | W 3–0 | 0 | 2–6–0 (2–6–0) |
| December 19 | 9:05 PM | vs. Colorado College | | Baxter Arena • Omaha, Nebraska | AT&T RM | Persson | T 1–1 ^{SOL} | 0 | 2–6–1 (2–6–1) |
| December 20 | 9:05 PM | vs. #4 North Dakota | | Baxter Arena • Omaha, Nebraska | | Kraws | L 2–6 | 0 | 2–7–1 (2–7–1) |
| January 2 | 7:05 PM | at Western Michigan | | Lawson Arena • Kalamazoo, Michigan | | Persson | W 3–1 | 0 | 3–7–1 (3–7–1) |
| January 3 | 5:05 PM | at Western Michigan | | Lawson Arena • Kalamazoo, Michigan | | Persson | W 5–1 | 0 | 4–7–1 (4–7–1) |
| January 8 | 7:00 PM | vs. Western Michigan | | Steve Cady Arena • Oxford, Ohio | | Persson | L 1–4 | 0 | 4–8–1 (4–8–1) |
| January 9 | 5:00 PM | vs. Western Michigan | | Steve Cady Arena • Oxford, Ohio | | Persson | T 3–3 ^{SOL} | 0 | 4–8–2 (4–8–2) |
| January 22 | 8:30 PM | at #6 St. Cloud State | | Herb Brooks National Hockey Center • St. Cloud, Minnesota | | Persson | L 2–3 | 86 | 4–9–2 (4–9–2) |
| January 23 | 8:00 PM | at #6 St. Cloud State | | Herb Brooks National Hockey Center • St. Cloud, Minnesota | | Persson | L 2–8 | 110 | 4–10–2 (4–10–2) |
| January 29 | 7:05 PM | vs. #6 Minnesota Duluth | | Steve Cady Arena • Oxford, Ohio | | Persson | L 1–2 | 0 | 4–11–2 (4–11–2) |
| January 30 | 5:00 PM | vs. #6 Minnesota Duluth | | Steve Cady Arena • Oxford, Ohio | | Kraws | L 3–6 | 0 | 4–12–2 (4–12–2) |
| February 5 | 7:00 PM | at #5 Minnesota–Duluth | | AMSOIL Arena • Duluth, Minnesota | | Persson | L 1–8 | 150 | 4–13–2 (4–13–2) |
| February 6 | 5:00 PM | at #5 Minnesota–Duluth | | AMSOIL Arena • Duluth, Minnesota | | Persson | L 1–3 | 150 | 4–14–2 (4–14–2) |
| February 12 | 7:00 PM | vs. #6 St. Cloud State | | Steve Cady Arena • Oxford, Ohio | | Persson | W 3–2 | 0 | 5–14–2 (5–14–2) |
| February 13 | 5:05 PM | vs. #6 St. Cloud State | | Steve Cady Arena • Oxford, Ohio | | Valentine | L 2–4 | 0 | 5–15–2 (5–15–2) |
| February 26 | 6:05 PM | at Western Michigan | | Lawson Arena • Kalamazoo, Michigan | | Persson | L 2–5 | 125 | 5–16–2 (5–16–2) |
| February 28 | 6:05 PM | vs. Western Michigan | | Steve Cady Arena • Oxford, Ohio | CBSSN | Persson | L 2–4 | 0 | 5–17–2 (5–17–2) |
NCHC Tournament
| March 12 | 8:30 PM | at #2 North Dakota* | | Ralph Engelstad Arena • Grand Forks, North Dakota | | Persson | L 2–6 | 2,763 | 5–18–2 |
*Non-conference game. ^{#}Rankings from USCHO.com Poll. All times are in Eastern Time.

== Scoring statistics ==
| Name | Position | Games | Goals | Assists | Points | PIM |
|---|---|---|---|---|---|---|
| Matt Barry | F | 25 | 2 | 15 | 17 | 6 |
| Casey Gilling | C | 23 | 4 | 11 | 15 | 16 |
| Matthew Barbolini | F | 25 | 5 | 9 | 14 | 14 |
| Derek Daschke | D | 25 | 4 | 8 | 12 | 6 |
| Phil Knies | C/LW | 25 | 3 | 6 | 9 | 10 |
| Robby Drazner | D | 24 | 3 | 4 | 7 | 10 |
| Ben Lown | C | 17 | 1 | 5 | 6 | 2 |
| Rourke Russell | D | 15 | 3 | 2 | 5 | 12 |
| Ryan Savage | RW | 14 | 2 | 3 | 5 | 6 |
| Monte Graham | F | 23 | 2 | 3 | 5 | 6 |
| John Sladic | F | 25 | 3 | 1 | 4 | 17 |
| Joe Cassetti | LW | 11 | 2 | 2 | 4 | 6 |
| Jack Olmstead | F | 20 | 1 | 3 | 4 | 12 |
| Bray Crowder | D | 17 | 2 | 1 | 3 | 10 |
| Chase Pletzke | C | 21 | 2 | 1 | 3 | 2 |
| Hampus Rydqvist | D | 24 | 2 | 1 | 3 | 10 |
| Jack Clement | D | 25 | 2 | 1 | 3 | 6 |
| Scott Corbett | C | 20 | 1 | 2 | 3 | 12 |
| Alec Capstick | D | 15 | 2 | 0 | 2 | 4 |
| Andrew Sinard | D | 15 | 0 | 2 | 2 | 8 |
| Michael Holland | F | 14 | 1 | 0 | 1 | 0 |
| Dylan Moulton | D | 15 | 1 | 0 | 1 | 6 |
| Alec Mahalak | D | 13 | 0 | 1 | 1 | 2 |
| Grant Valentine | G | 2 | 0 | 0 | 0 | 0 |
| Ben Kraws | G | 8 | 0 | 0 | 0 | 0 |
| Caleb Rule | F | 9 | 0 | 0 | 0 | 6 |
| Brian Silver | F | 15 | 0 | 0 | 0 | 8 |
| Ludvig Persson | G | 18 | 0 | 0 | 0 | 0 |
| Bench | - | - | - | - | - | 4 |
| Total | | | 48 | 81 | 129 | 209 |

== Goaltending statistics ==
| Name | Games | Minutes | Wins | Losses | Ties | Goals against | Saves | Shut outs | SV % | GAA |
|---|---|---|---|---|---|---|---|---|---|---|
| Ludvig Persson | 18 | 986 | 5 | 11 | 2 | 43 | 533 | 2 | .925 | 2.62 |
| Grant Valentine | 2 | 82 | 0 | 1 | 0 | 5 | 40 | 0 | .889 | 3.66 |
| Ben Kraws | 8 | 427 | 0 | 6 | 0 | 32 | 223 | 0 | .875 | 4.49 |
| Empty Net | - | 14 | - | - | - | 9 | - | - | - | - |
| Total | 25 | 1510 | 5 | 18 | 2 | 89 | 796 | 2 | .899 | 3.54 |

== Rankings ==
| Poll | Week | | | | | | | | | | | | | | | | | | | | | |
| Poll | Pre | 1 | 2 | 3 | 4 | 5 | 6 | 7 | 8 | 9 | 10 | 11 | 12 | 13 | 14 | 15 | 16 | 17 | 18 | 19 | 20 | 21 (Final) |
|---|---|---|---|---|---|---|---|---|---|---|---|---|---|---|---|---|---|---|---|---|---|---|
| USCHO.com | NR | NR | NR | NR | NR | NR | NR | NR | NR | NR | NR | NR | NR | NR | NR | NR | NR | NR | NR | NR | - | NR |
| USA Today | NR | NR | NR | NR | NR | NR | NR | NR | NR | NR | NR | NR | NR | NR | NR | NR | NR | NR | NR | NR | NR | NR |

USCHO did not release a poll in week 20.

== Awards and honors ==
| Player | Award | Ref |
|---|---|---|
| Ludvig Persson | NCHC Three Stars Award | |
| Ludvig Persson | NCHC Second Team | |
| Ludvig Persson | NCHC Rookie Team | |

== Players drafted into the NHL ==
=== 2021 NHL entry draft ===
| Round | Pick | Player | NHL team |
|---|---|---|---|
| 4 | 114 | Redmond Savage^{†} | Detroit Red Wings |

† incoming freshman
